= 2020–21 Peterborough United F.C. season =

Peterborough United
2020–21 season
- Chairman: Darragh MacAnthony
- Manager: Darren Ferguson
- Stadium: Weston Homes Stadium
- League One: 2nd (promoted)
- FA Cup: Second round
- EFL Cup: First round
- EFL Trophy: Quarter-final
- Top goalscorer: League: Jonson Clarke-Harris (31); All: Jonson Clarke-Harris (33)
Home colours	Away colours	Third colours

The 2020–21 Peterborough United F.C. season was the club's 87th season in their history and the eighth consecutive season in EFL League One, Along with League One, the club also participated in the FA Cup, EFL Cup, and EFL Trophy.

The season covers the period from 1 July 2020 to 30 June 2021.

With a 3–3 draw against Lincoln City on 1 May 2021, Peterborough secured automatic promotion to the Championship, making a return to the second division after an eight-year absence.

== First-team squad ==
As of 18 January 2021

Note: Flags indicate national team as has been defined under FIFA eligibility rules. Players may hold more than one non-FIFA nationality.

No.	Name	Nat.	Position(s)	Date of birth (age)	Apps.	Goals	Year signed	Signed from	Transfer fee
Goalkeepers
1	Christy Pym	(England)	GK	24 April 1995 (age 31)	87	0	2019	(England) Exeter City	Free
13	Dániel Gyollai	(Hungary)	GK	7 April 1997 (aged 24)	4	0	2020	(England) Wigan Athletic	Free
21	Josef Bursik	(England)	GK	12 July 2000 (aged 20)	5	0	2021	(England) Stoke City	Loan
Defenders
2	Ronnie Edwards	(England)	CB/DM	28 March 2003 (aged 18)	6	0	2020	(England) Barnet	Undisclosed
3	Dan Butler	(England)	LB/LM	26 August 1994 (aged 26)	80	3	2019	(Wales) Newport County	Free
4	Nathan Thompson	(England)	CB/RB/DM	9 November 1990 (aged 30)	61	2	2019	(England) Portsmouth	Free
5	Mark Beevers	(England)	CB/LB	21 November 1989 (aged 31)	85	0	2019	(England) Bolton Wanderers	Free
6	Frankie Kent	(England)	CB	21 November 1995 (aged 25)	83	4	2019	(England) Colchester United	£360,000
18	Frazer Blake-Tracy	(England)	LB/CB	10 September 1995 (aged 25)	32	0	2019	(England) King's Lynn Town	Pre contract agreement
24	Niall Mason	(England)	RB/CB/LB	10 January 1997 (aged 24)	70	2	2019	(England) Doncaster Rovers	Free
Midfielders
8	Jack Taylor	(Republic of Ireland)	CM/RM/RB	23 June 1998 (age 28)	50	9	2020	(England) Barnet	£500,000
12	Reece Brown	(England)	AM/CM	6 March 1996 (aged 25)	55	2	2020	(England) Huddersfield Town	Loan
14	Louis Reed	(England)	CM/DM	25 June 1997 (age 29)	84	3	2018	(England) Sheffield United	Undisclosed
15	Sammie Szmodics	(Republic of Ireland)	AM/LW/CM	24 September 1995 (aged 25)	55	19	2020	(England) Bristol City	Undisclosed
16	Harrison Burrows	(England)	LM/LB/CM	12 January 2002 (aged 19)	36	1	2017	Academy	Trainee
22	Ethan Hamilton	(Scotland)	CM/LM/LB	18 October 1998 (aged 22)	41	1	2020	(England) Manchester United	Free
23	Joe Ward	(England)	RM/RW/RB	22 August 1995 (aged 25)	145	14	2018	(England) Woking	Undisclosed
26	Flynn Clarke	(Scotland) (England)	AM	14 August 2002 (aged 19)	11	3	2019	Academy	Trainee
27	Kyle Barker	(England)	DM/CM	16 December 2000 (aged 20)	3	0	2020	Academy	Trainee
34	Archie Jones	(England)	CM	13 June 2001 (age 25)	1	0	2019	Academy	Trainee
Forwards
7	Mohamed Eisa	(Sudan)	CF/LW/RW	12 July 1994 (aged 26)	71	21	2019	(England) Bristol City	Undisclosed
9	Jonson Clarke-Harris	(England)	CF	21 July 1994 (aged 26)	48	33	2020	(England) Bristol Rovers	£1,250,000
10	Siriki Dembélé	(Scotland) (Ivory Coast)	RW/LW/CF	7 September 1996 (aged 24)	122	26	2018	(England) Grimsby Town	Undisclosed
17	Ricky Jade-Jones	(England)	CF/SS/LW	8 November 2002 (age 24)	33	5	2019	Academy	Trainee
19	Idris Kanu	(England)	RW/CF	5 December 1999 (aged 21)	63	3	2017	(England) Aldershot Town	Undisclosed
Out on Loan
11	Ryan Broom	(Wales)	RM/CM/AM	4 September 1996 (aged 24)	18	1	2020	(England) Cheltenham Town	Undisclosed
20	Serhat Tasdemir	(Azerbaijan) (England)	RM/CM/LM	21 July 2000 (aged 20)	20	1	2019	(England) AFC Fylde	Undisclosed
30	Sam Cartwright	(England)	CB	8 July 2000 (aged 20)	2	0	2017	Academy	Trainee

== Statistics ==
As of 9 May 2021

No.	Pos	Nat	Player	Total		League One		FA Cup		League Cup		League Trophy	
No.	Pos	Nat	Player	Apps	Goals	Apps	Goals	Apps	Goals	Apps	Goals	Apps	Goals
1	GK	(England) ENG	Christy Pym	44	0	40+0	0	1+0	0	1+0	0	2+0	0
2	DF	(England) ENG	Ronnie Edwards	6	0	2+0	0	0+1	0	0+0	0	3+0	0
3	DF	(England) ENG	Dan Butler	42	1	38+2	1	0+0	0	1+0	0	1+0	0
4	DF	(England) ENG	Nathan Thompson	42	1	38+0	1	1+0	0	1+0	0	2+0	0
5	DF	(England) ENG	Mark Beevers	47	0	44+0	0	0+0	0	1+0	0	1+1	0
6	DF	(England) ENG	Frankie Kent	48	2	44+0	1	1+0	0	1+0	0	2+0	1
7	FW	(Sudan) SDN	Mohamed Eisa	35	5	6+21	2	1+0	0	1+0	0	4+2	3
8	MF	(Republic of Ireland) IRL	Jack Taylor	38	9	34+1	6	1+0	2	1+0	0	1+0	1
9	FW	(England) ENG	Jonson Clarke-Harris	48	33	44+0	31	0+1	0	0+0	0	2+1	2
10	FW	(Scotland) SCO	Siriki Dembélé	44	13	37+4	11	1+0	1	1+0	0	1+0	1
12	MF	(England) ENG	Reece Brown	43	2	33+5	2	0+1	0	1+0	0	2+1	0
13	GK	(Hungary) HUN	Dániel Gyollai	4	0	0+0	0	0+0	0	0+0	0	4+0	0
14	MF	(England) ENG	Louis Reed	19	1	11+5	0	1+0	0	0+0	0	2+0	1
15	MF	(England) ENG	Sammie Szmodics	44	15	39+2	14	0+0	0	0+0	0	2+1	1
16	MF	(England) ENG	Harrison Burrows	26	1	8+12	1	0+0	0	0+0	0	5+1	0
17	FW	(England) ENG	Ricky Jade-Jones	17	1	1+15	1	0+0	0	0+0	0	0+1	0
18	DF	(England) ENG	Frazer Blake-Tracy	14	0	3+5	0	1+0	0	0+0	0	5+0	0
19	FW	(England) ENG	Idris Kanu	24	2	7+10	2	0+0	0	0+1	0	5+1	0
21	GK	(England) ENG	Josef Bursik	5	0	5+0	0	0+0	0	0+0	0	0+0	0
22	MF	(Scotland) SCO	Ethan Hamilton	40	1	13+20	0	1+0	0	0+0	0	6+0	1
23	MF	(England) ENG	Joe Ward	39	4	34+2	4	0+0	0	1+0	0	1+1	0
24	DF	(England) ENG	Niall Mason	32	2	6+20	1	1+0	0	0+0	0	4+1	1
26	MF	(Scotland) SCO	Flynn Clarke	10	3	2+2	0	0+0	0	0+1	0	4+1	3
27	MF	(England) ENG	Kyle Barker	3	0	0+1	0	0+0	0	0+0	0	1+1	0
32	GK	(England) ENG	Will Blackmore	1	0	0+1	0	0+0	0	0+0	0	0+0	0
36	DF	(England) ENG	Benjamin Mensah	1	0	0+0	0	0+0	0	0+0	0	0+1	0
37	MF	(England) ENG	Charlie O'Connell	1	0	0+1	0	0+0	0	0+0	0	0+0	0
42	FW	(Portugal) POR	Adler Nascimento	1	0	0+1	0	0+0	0	0+0	0	0+0	0
Players out on loan:
11	MF	(Wales) WAL	Ryan Broom	17	1	5+10	1	1+0	0	1+0	0	0+0	0
20	MF	(Azerbaijan) AZE	Serhat Tasdemir	3	1	0+0	0	0+0	0	0+0	0	3+0	1
Players who left the club:
21	MF	(Scotland) SCO	George Boyd	1	1	0+0	0	0+0	0	0+0	0	1+0	1
25	DF	(Scotland) SCO	Jason Naismith	2	0	0+0	0	0+0	0	0+0	0	2+0	0

=== Disciplinary record ===
As of 8 May 2021

Rank	No.	Nat.	Po.	Name	League One			FA Cup			League Cup			League Trophy			Total		
Rank	No.	Nat.	Po.	Name	Yellow card	(yellow card) (yellow-red card)	Red card	Yellow card	(yellow card) (yellow-red card)	Red card	Yellow card	(yellow card) (yellow-red card)	Red card	Yellow card	(yellow card) (yellow-red card)	Red card	Yellow card	(yellow card) (yellow-red card)	Red card
1	4	(England)	DF	Nathan Thompson	10	1	0	0	0	0	1	0	0	0	0	0	11	1	0
2	5	(England)	DF	Mark Beevers	8	0	0	0	0	0	0	0	0	1	0	0	9	0	0
3	6	(England)	DF	Frankie Kent	8	0	0	0	0	0	0	0	0	0	0	0	8	0	0
4	10	(Scotland)	FW	Siriki Dembélé	7	0	0	0	0	0	0	0	0	0	0	0	7	0	0
5	8	(Republic of Ireland)	MF	Jack Taylor	6	0	0	0	0	0	0	0	0	0	0	0	6	0	0
5	22	(Scotland)	MF	Ethan Hamilton	2	1	0	1	0	0	0	0	0	1	0	0	4	1	0
7	3	(England)	DF	Dan Butler	5	0	0	0	0	0	0	0	0	0	0	0	5	0	0
8	9	(England)	FW	Jonson Clarke-Harris	4	0	0	0	0	0	0	0	0	0	0	0	4	0	0
8	12	(England)	MF	Reece Brown	4	0	0	0	0	0	0	0	0	0	0	0	4	0	0
10	15	(England)	MF	Sammie Szmodics	3	0	0	0	0	0	0	0	0	0	0	0	3	0	0
11	1	(England)	GK	Christy Pym	2	0	0	0	0	0	0	0	0	0	0	0	2	0	0
11	14	(England)	MF	Louis Reed	1	0	0	0	0	0	0	0	0	1	0	0	2	0	0
11	18	(England)	DF	Frazer Blake-Tracy	1	0	0	0	0	0	0	0	0	1	0	0	2	0	0
14	16	(England)	MF	Harrison Burrows	1	0	0	0	0	0	0	0	0	0	0	0	1	0	0
14	23	(England)	MF	Joe Ward	1	0	0	0	0	0	0	0	0	0	0	0	1	0	0
14	24	(England)	DF	Niall Mason	1	0	0	0	0	0	0	0	0	0	0	0	1	0	0
14	26	(Scotland)	MF	Flynn Clarke	0	0	0	0	0	0	0	0	0	1	0	0	1	0	0
Total					63	2	0	1	0	0	1	0	0	5	0	0	70	2	0

== Transfers ==
=== Transfers in ===
Date	Pos.	Nat.	Name	From	Fee	Ref.
30 July 2020	GK	(Hungary)	Dániel Gyollai	(England) Wigan Athletic	Free transfer	
10 August 2020	CB	(England)	Ronnie Edwards	(England) Barnet	Undisclosed	
13 August 2020	CM	(Scotland)	Ethan Hamilton	(England) Manchester United	Free transfer	
24 August 2020	RM	(Wales)	Ryan Broom	(England) Cheltenham Town	Undisclosed	
27 August 2020	CF	(England)	Jonson Clarke-Harris	(England) Bristol Rovers	Undisclosed	
8 September 2020	AM	(England)	Sammie Szmodics	(England) Bristol City	Undisclosed	

=== Loans in ===
Date from	Pos.	Nat.	Name	From	Date until	Ref.
17 August 2020	AM	(England)	Reece Brown	(England) Huddersfield Town	30 June 2021	
8 April 2021	GK	(England)	Josef Bursik	(England) Stoke City	30 June 2021	

=== Loans out ===
Date from	Pos.	Nat.	Name	From	Date until	Ref.
21 September 2020	CM	(England)	Archie Jones	(England) Bishop's Stortford	October 2020	
24 September 2020	CB	(England)	Sam Cartwright	(England) Woking		
9 October 2020	DM	(England)	Kyle Barker	(England) King's Lynn Town	January 2021	
1 February 2021	RM	(Wales)	Ryan Broom	(England) Burton Albion	End of season	
1 February 2021	RM	(Azerbaijan)	Serhat Tasdemir	(England) Oldham Athletic	End of season	
11 February 2021	CF	(England)	Bradley Rolt	(Republic of Ireland) Bohemians	End of season	

=== Transfers out ===
Date	Pos.	Nat.	Name	To	Fee	Ref.
1 July 2020	CB	(England)	Rhys Bennett	(England) Carlisle United	Released	
1 July 2020	GK	(England)	Aaron Chapman	(Scotland) Motherwell	Released	
1 July 2020	AM	(England)	Callum Cooke	(England) Bradford City	Released	
1 July 2020	AM	(England)	Marcus Maddison	(England) Charlton Athletic	Released	
1 July 2020	DM	(Scotland)	Mark O'Hara	(Scotland) Motherwell	Undisclosed	
1 July 2020	GK	(Republic of Ireland)	Conor O'Malley	Retired	—N/a	
1 July 2020	CM	(England)	Alex Woodyard	(England) AFC Wimbledon	Released	
1 September 2020	CF	(England)	Ivan Toney	(England) Brentford	£5,000,000	
2 September 2020	LW	(England)	George Cooper	(England) Plymouth Argyle	Undisclosed	
3 November 2020	LW	(Scotland)	George Boyd	(England) Salford City	Released	
7 December 2020	RB	(Scotland)	Jason Naismith	(Scotland) Ross County	Released	
18 February 2021	CB	(England)	Bobby Copping	Retired	—N/a	

== Pre-season ==
1 August 2020 Friendly	Stamford	0–1	Peterborough United	Stamford
15:00 BST		Report	Rolt 72'	Stadium: The Zeeco Stadium

4 August 2020 Friendly	Peterborough United	4–2	Peterborough Sports	Peterborough
18:30 BST	Cartwright 4'; Cooper 19'; Jones 27' (o.g.); Kanu 45'	Report	Macleod 37'; Johnson 80'	Stadium: Mick George Training Academy

8 August 2020 Friendly	Peterborough United	8–0	Kettering Town	Peterborough
12:00 BST	Eisa x2 Rolt x3 Taylor x1 Clarke x1 Cooper x1	Report		Stadium: Mick George Training Academy

11 August 2020 Friendly	Mansfield Town	0–2	Peterborough United	Mansfield
12:00 BST		Report	Dembélé (pen); Boyd	Stadium: The John Fretwell Sporting Complex

18 August 2020 Friendly	Peterborough United	3–0	Stoke City Under-23s	Burton upon Trent
14:00 BST	Burrows; Jones; Toney	Report		Stadium: St George's Park National Football Centre

19 August 2020 Friendly	Peterborough United	1–2	Derby County	Burton upon Trent
14:00 BST	Dembélé	Report	Sibley; Shonibare	Stadium: St George's Park National Football Centre

25 August 2020 Friendly	Colchester United	1–3	Peterborough United	Colchester
13:00 BST	Brown 82'	Report	Butler 29', 52'; Dembélé 32'	Stadium: JobServe Community Stadium

25 August 2020 Friendly	Colchester United	0–2	Peterborough United	Colchester
15:30 BST		Report	Jones 31', 34'	Stadium: JobServe Community Stadium

29 August 2020 Friendly	Peterborough United	1–2	Coventry City	Peterborough
13:00 BST	Broom 72'	Report	Godden 56'; O'Hare 85'	Stadium: Weston Homes Stadium; Attendance: 0

29 August 2020 Friendly	Peterborough United	2–3	Coventry City	Peterborough
15:20 BST	Jones 30'; Eisa 73'	Report	Bakayoko 22', 64'; Jones 60'	Stadium: Weston Homes Stadium; Attendance: 0

== Competitions ==
=== EFL League One ===
==== League table ====
Pos	Team	Pld	W	D	L	GF	GA	GD	Pts	Promotion, qualification or relegation
1	Hull City (C, P)	46	27	8	11	80	38	+42	89	Promotion to the EFL Championship
2	Peterborough United (P)	46	26	9	11	83	46	+37	87	Promotion to the EFL Championship
3	Blackpool (O, P)	46	23	11	12	60	37	+23	80	Qualification for League One play-offs
4	Sunderland	46	20	17	9	70	42	+28	77	Qualification for League One play-offs
5	Lincoln City	46	22	11	13	69	50	+19	77	Qualification for League One play-offs
6	Oxford United	46	22	8	16	77	56	+21	74	Qualification for League One play-offs
7	Charlton Athletic	46	20	14	12	70	56	+14	74	
8	Portsmouth	46	21	9	16	65	51	+14	72	

Source: EFL Official Website
Rules for classification: 1) Points; 2) Goal difference; 3) Number of goals scored; 4) Head-to-head results; 5) Wins; 6) Away goals; 7) Penalty points (sec 9.5); 8) 12-point sending off offences
(C) Champions; (O) Play-off winners; (P) Promoted

==== Results summary ====
Overall								Home						Away					
Pld	W	D	L	GF	GA	GD	Pts	W	D	L	GF	GA	GD	W	D	L	GF	GA	GD
46	26	9	11	83	46	+37	87	15	5	3	52	22	+30	11	4	8	31	24	+7

Last updated: 9 May 2021.
Source: BBC

==== Results by matchday ====
Matchday	1	2	3	4	5	6	7	8	9	10	11	12	13	14	15	16	17	18	19	20	21	22	23	24	25	26	27	28	29	30	31	32	33	34	35	36	37	38	39	40	41	42	43	44	45	46
Ground	A	H	A	H	A	H	A	A	H	H	A	A	H	H	A	A	H	A	A	H	H	A	H	A	H	H	A	H	A	H	A	A	H	H	A	A	H	A	H	A	H	H	A	H	H	A
Result	L	W	L	W	W	W	W	W	D	W	W	L	L	W	L	L	W	D	D	W	W	W	D	L	W	W	W	W	W	W	D	L	L	W	D	L	W	W	D	W	W	L	W	D	D	W
Position	23	15	19	8	5	4	4	2	4	1	1	1	2	2	3	5	4	3	5	5	5	3	3	4	4	3	3	2	1	1	1	2	2	2	2	2	2	2	2	2	2	2	2	2	2	2

Updated to match(es) played on 9 May 2021. Source: 11v11 for league tables and fixtures
A = Away; H = Home; W = Win; D = Draw; L = Loss

==== Matches ====
Win Draw Loss Postponed

The 2020–21 season fixtures were released on 21 August.

12 September 2020 1	Accrington Stanley	2–0	Peterborough United	Accrington
15:00 BST		Report		Stadium: Wham Stadium; Attendance: 0 Referee: Marc Edwards

19 September 2020 2	Peterborough United	2–1	Fleetwood Town	Peterborough
15:00 BST	Kent (yellow card) 49'; Thompson (yellow card) 63'; Taylor 90+1'; Szmodics 90+5'	Report	Camps 55'; Burns (yellow card) 57'	Stadium: Weston Homes Stadium; Attendance: 0 Referee: Christopher Sarginson

26 September 2020 3	Sunderland	1–0	Peterborough United	Sunderland
15:00 BST	Scowen (yellow card) 6'; O'Brien (yellow card) 62'; Leadbitter 81' (pen.); Gooch (yellow card) 84'	Report		Stadium: Stadium of Light; Attendance: 0 Referee: Scott Oldham

3 October 2020 4	Peterborough United	3–1	Swindon Town	Peterborough
15:00 BST	Clarke-Harris 48' 69' (pen.); Broom 78'	Report	Payne 6'; Baudry (yellow card) 45'; Caddis (yellow card) 68'; Grounds (yellow card) 90+1'	Stadium: Weston Homes Stadium; Attendance: 0 Referee: Leigh Doughty

10 October 2020 5	Northampton Town	0–2	Peterborough United	Northampton
15:00 BST	Hoskins (yellow card) 51'; Korboa (yellow card) 73'; Watson (yellow card) 85'	Report	Thompson 33'; Brown 80'	Stadium: PTS Academy Stadium; Attendance: 0 Referee: Brett Huxtable

17 October 2020 6	Peterborough United	2–0	Oxford United	Peterborough
15:00 BST	Ward (yellow card) 27' (goal) 43'; Dembele 65' (yellow card) 67'; Butler (yellow card) 88'	Report	Clare (yellow card) 23'; Henry (yellow card) 58'	Stadium: Weston Homes Stadium; Attendance: 0 Referee: Carl Boyeson

20 October 2020 7	Wigan Athletic	0–1	Peterborough United	Wigan
19:00 BST	Massey (yellow card) 66'	Report	Butler (yellow card) 6'; Clarke-Harris 28'	Stadium: DW Stadium; Attendance: 0 Referee: Ross Joyce

24 October 2020 8	Hull City	1–2	Peterborough United	Kingston upon Hull
15:00 BST	Elder (yellow card) 19'; Wilks 36'; Smallwood (yellow card) 65'; Honeyman (yellow card) 90+3'	Report	Thompson (yellow card) 33'; Clarke-Harris 63'; Dembele 75'	Stadium: KCOM Stadium; Attendance: 0 Referee: Tom Nield

27 October 2020 9	Peterborough United	2–2	Burton Albion	Peterborough
19:00 GMT	Clarke-Harris 10' (penalty missed) 48'; Ward 48'; Mason (yellow card) 89'	Report	Hemmings 32', 60'; Gilligan (yellow card) 58'; Akins (yellow card) 62'; O'Toole (yellow card) 71'	Stadium: Weston Homes Stadium; Attendance: 0 Referee: Paul Howard

31 October 2020 10	Peterborough United	5–1	Shrewsbury Town	Peterborough
15:00 GMT	Clarke-Harris 16' (pen.); Dembele 42', 69', 80'; Brown (yellow card) 50'; Taylor 80'; Szmodics (yellow card) 84'	Report	Burgoyne (yellow card) 16'; Daniels 17'; Vela (red card) 45+2'; Norburn (yellow card) 58'; Ebanks-Landell (yellow card) 77'	Stadium: Weston Homes Stadium; Attendance: 0 Referee: James Oldham

3 November 2020 11	Bristol Rovers	0–2	Peterborough United	Bristol
19:00 GMT	Ehmer (yellow card) 38'; Hare (yellow card) 77'	Report	Taylor 42'; Brown (yellow card) 55'; Butler 64'	Stadium: Memorial Stadium; Attendance: 0 Referee: Lee Swabey

14 November 2020 12	Crewe Alexandra	2–0	Peterborough United	Crewe
15:00 GMT	Pickering 29'; Kirk 41'	Report		Stadium: Alexandra Stadium; Attendance: 0 Referee: Christopher Pollard

21 November 2020 13	Peterborough United	1–2	Blackpool	Peterborough
15:00 GMT	Butler (yellow card) 66'; Clarke-Harris (yellow card) 68'; Dembélé (yellow card) 81'; Kent 84'	Report	Yates 19'; Husband (yellow card) 31'; Dougall (yellow card) 44'; Madine 90'	Stadium: Weston Homes Stadium; Attendance: 0 Referee: Ollie Yates

24 November 2020 14	Peterborough United	1–0	Plymouth Argyle	Peterborough
19:00 GMT	Dembélé (yellow card) 18'; Clarke-Harris 41'	Report	Wootton (yellow card) 26'; Opoku (yellow card) 29'	Stadium: Weston Homes Stadium; Attendance: 0 Referee: Tom Nield

2 December 2020 15	AFC Wimbledon	2–1	Peterborough United	Wimbledon
18:00 GMT	Longman 54'; Pigott 60'; Nightingale (yellow card) 62'; Woodyard (yellow card) 84'	Report	Clarke-Harris 71'	Stadium: Plough Lane; Attendance: 0 Referee: Kevin Johnson

5 December 2020 16	Portsmouth	2–0	Peterborough United	Milton
15:00 GMT	Cannon (yellow card) 57'; Whatmough 61'; Naylor (yellow card) 68' (goal) 75'; Brown (yellow card) 88'	Report	Thompson (yellow card) 50'; Blake-Tracy (yellow card) 61'; Taylor (yellow card) 85'	Stadium: Fratton Park; Attendance: 2,000; Referee: Peter Wright

12 December 2020 17	Peterborough United	4–1	Rochdale	Peterborough
15:00 GMT	Clarke-Harris 5' (pen.), 10', 22'; Beevers (yellow card) 36'; Thompson 40' (yellow card) 45+1'	Report	Humphrys 9'	Stadium: Weston Homes Stadium; Attendance: 2,000; Referee: Brett Huxtable

15 December 2020 18	Milton Keynes Dons	1–1	Peterborough United	Denbigh
19:45 GMT	Sorinola (yellow card) 32'; Lewington (yellow card) 53'; Kasumu (yellow card) 55'; Jerome 78'; Harvie (yellow card) 81'	Report	Clarke-Harris 25'; Pym (yellow card) 45+1'; Burrows (yellow card) 68'	Stadium: Stadium:mk; Attendance: 0 Referee: Robert Lewis

9 January 2021 19	Lincoln City	1–1	Peterborough United	Lincoln
12:30 GMT	Jackson (yellow card) 16'; Bridcutt (yellow card) 21'; Scully 49'; Grant (penalty missed) 68; Eyoma (yellow card) 80'; Jones (yellow card) 90+1'	Report	Eyoma 10' (o.g.); Thompson (yellow card) 23' (yellow-red card) 67'; Brown (yellow card) 63'; Kent (yellow card) 89'	Stadium: LNER Stadium; Attendance: 0 Referee: Will Finnie

16 January 2021 20	Peterborough United	3–0	Milton Keynes Dons	Peterborough
15:00 GMT	Clarke-Harris 7'; Szmodics 30', 65'; Taylor (yellow card) 61'	Report	Davies (yellow card) 90+1'	Stadium: Weston Homes Stadium; Attendance: 0 Referee: Marc Edwards

19 January 2021 21	Peterborough United	2–1	Charlton Athletic	Peterborough
18:30 GMT	Pym (yellow card) 13'; Kent (yellow card) 65'; Szmodics 66', 79' (yellow card) 85'	Report	Washington 14' (pen.); Forster-Caskey (yellow card) 45+1'; Millar (yellow card) 51'; Smyth (yellow card) 63'; Pratley (yellow card) 90+1'	Stadium: Weston Homes Stadium; Attendance: 0 Referee: Sam Purkiss

23 January 2021 22	Ipswich Town	0–1	Peterborough United	Ipswich
15:00 GMT	Ward (yellow card) 60'; Edwards (yellow card) 71'	Report	Clarke-Harris (penalty missed) 33; Taylor (yellow card) 45+1'; McGuinness 69' (o.g.)	Stadium: Portman Road; Attendance: 0 Referee: Antony Coggins

26 January 2021 23	Peterborough United	0–0	Bristol Rovers	Peterborough
19:00 GMT	Thompson (yellow card) 52'; Beevers (yellow card) 82'	Report	Kilgour (yellow card) 83'; Ogogo (yellow card) 84'; Leahy (yellow card) 87'	Stadium: Weston Homes Stadium; Attendance: 0 Referee: Graham Salisbury

30 January 2021 24	Shrewsbury Town	2–0	Peterborough United	Shrewsbury
15:00 GMT	Love (yellow card) 42'; Chapman 51', 86'	Report	Hamilton (yellow card) 24'; Thompson (yellow card) 52'	Stadium: Montgomery Waters Meadow; Attendance: 0 Referee: Kevin Johnson

6 February 2021 25	Peterborough United	2–0	Crewe Alexandra	Peterborough
15:00 GMT	Szmodics 25'; Clarke-Harris 31'; Taylor (yellow card) 33'; Kent (yellow card) 47'; Dembele (yellow card) 63'	Report		Stadium: Weston Homes Stadium; Attendance: 0 Referee: Carl Boyeson

9 February 2021 26	Peterborough United	2–1	Ipswich Town	Peterborough
19:00 GMT	Clarke-Harris 38'; Ward 50'	Report	Norwood 6'; Downes (yellow card) 14'; Dozzell (yellow card) 76'	Stadium: Weston Homes Stadium; Attendance: 0 Referee: Ben Toner

16 February 2021 27	Gillingham	1–3	Peterborough United	Gillingham
18:00 GMT	Akinde 32' (pen.), (yellow card) 65'; Slattery (yellow card) 48'; McKenzie (yellow card) 79'	Report	Kent (yellow card) 44'; Clarke-Harris 47', (yellow card) 64', (goal) 67'; Dembélé 52'; Butler (yellow card) 77'	Stadium: Priestfield Stadium; Attendance: 0 Referee: Charles Breakspear

20 February 2021 28	Peterborough United	3–0	AFC Wimbledon	Peterborough
15:00 GMT	Szmodics 48', 52'; Clarke-Harris 90'	Report	Dobson (yellow card) 42'	Stadium: Weston Homes Stadium; Attendance: 0 Referee: Andy Woolmer

23 February 2021 29	Plymouth Argyle	0–3	Peterborough United	Plymouth
19:30 GMT	Hardie (yellow card) 89'	Report	Beevers (yellow card) 22'; Szmodics 46'; Clarke-Harris 63'; Taylor 84'	Stadium: Home Park; Attendance: 0 Referee: Christopher Sarginson

27 February 2021 30	Peterborough United	2–1	Wigan Athletic	Peterborough
15:00 GMT	Beevers (yellow card) 12'; Clarke-Harris 82', 85' (pen.), (yellow card) 85'; Dembélé (yellow card) 90+1'	Report	Robinson (yellow card) 49'; Aasgaard 72'	Stadium: Weston Homes Stadium; Attendance: 0 Referee: Thomas Bramall

2 March 2021 31	Oxford United	0–0	Peterborough United	Oxford
19:00 GMT	Rodríguez (yellow card) 75'; Moore (yellow card) 77'	Report		Stadium: The Kassam Stadium; Attendance: 0 Referee: Alan Young

6 March 2021 32	Burton Albion	2–1	Peterborough United	Burton upon Trent
15:00 GMT	Smith (yellow card) 6'; Hemmings 54'; Carter 58', (yellow card) 90+4'; Brayford (yellow card) 68'	Report	Beevers (yellow card) 57'; Burrows 90+5'	Stadium: Pirelli Stadium; Attendance: 0 Referee: Carl Brook

9 March 2021 33	Peterborough United	1–3	Hull City	Peterborough
19:00 GMT	Brown 8'; Hamilton (yellow card) 28' (yellow-red card) 41'; Kent (yellow card) 59'; Dembélé (yellow card) 90+4'	Report	Burke 21'; Lewis-Potter 49'; Wilks 60' (pen.)	Stadium: Weston Homes Stadium; Attendance: 0 Referee: John Busby

16 March 2021 34	Peterborough United	1–0	Portsmouth	Peterborough
19:00 GMT	Nicolaisen 32' (o.g.); Beevers (yellow card) 77'	Report	Whatmough (yellow card) 41'; White (yellow card) 83'	Stadium: Weston Homes Stadium; Attendance: 0 Referee: James Oldham

20 March 2021 35	Rochdale	3–3	Peterborough United	Rochdale
15:00 GMT	Humphrys 55' (pen.); Rathbone (yellow card) 58'; Beesley 87'; Keohane 90'; Baah (yellow card) 90+5'	Report	Dembélé 5'; Szmodics 45+1'; Kent (yellow card) 77'; Clarke-Harris 90+3' (pen.)	Stadium: Spotland; Attendance: 0 Referee: David Rock

23 March 2021 36	Blackpool	3–1	Peterborough United	Blackpool
19:00 GMT	Yates 1', 52' (pen.); Ward (yellow card) 48'; Garbutt 58'	Report	Brown (yellow card) 16'; Kent (yellow card) 20'; Ward 45+2'; Hamilton (yellow card) 51'; Thompson (yellow card) 80'	Stadium: Bloomfield Road; Attendance: 0 Referee: Bobby Madley

27 March 2021 37	Peterborough United	7–0	Accrington Stanley	Peterborough
15:00 GMT	Clarke-Harris 3', 9', 65'; Szmodics 23', 48'; Eisa 77'; Kanu 82'	Report	Morgan (yellow card) 73'; Maguire (yellow card) 82'	Stadium: Weston Homes Stadium; Attendance: 0 Referee: Sam Purkiss

2 April 2021 38	Fleetwood Town	0–1	Peterborough United	Fleetwood
15:00 BST	Connolly (yellow card) 25'	Report	Clarke-Harris 89'	Stadium: Highbury Stadium; Attendance: 0 Referee: Ben Speedie

5 April 2021 39	Peterborough United	1–1	Sunderland	Peterborough
15:00 BST	Reed (yellow card) 18'; Butler (yellow card) 38'; Dembélé 66'	Report	McGeady 81'	Stadium: Weston Homes Stadium; Attendance: 0 Referee: Craig Hicks

10 April 2021 40	Swindon Town	0–3	Peterborough United	Swindon
15:00 BST	Twine (yellow card) 37'; Camp (yellow card) 61'	Report	Dembélé 17', 23'; Clarke-Harris (penalty missed) 61, 90+4'; Taylor (yellow card) 86'	Stadium: The Energy Check County Ground; Attendance: 0 Referee: Joshua Smith

16 April 2021 41	Peterborough United	3–1	Northampton Town	Peterborough
19:45 BST	Szmodics 33', 48'; Beevers (yellow card) 42'; Clarke-Harris 67' (pen.)	Report	Hoskins 43' (pen.); McWilliams (yellow card) 56'; Rose (yellow card) 79'; Jones (yellow card) 90+4'	Stadium: Weston Homes Stadium; Attendance: 0 Referee: Lee Swabey

20 April 2021 42	Peterborough United	0–1	Gillingham	Peterborough
19:45 BST	Thompson (yellow card) 18'; Szmodics (yellow card) 21'; Dembélé (yellow card) 51'	Report	Ogilvie 15'; MacDonald (yellow card) 23'; Dempsey (yellow card) 85'	Stadium: Weston Homes Stadium; Attendance: 0 Referee: Sam Allison

24 April 2021 43	Charlton Athletic	0–1	Peterborough United	Charlton
15:00 BST	Stockley (penalty missed) 32; Gilbey (yellow card) 55'	Report	Clarke-Harris 9'; Thompson (yellow card) 45+1'	Stadium: The Valley; Attendance: 0 Referee: Keith Stroud

27 April 2021 44	Peterborough United	2–2	Doncaster Rovers	Peterborough
19:45 BST	Ward 10'; Szmodics 23'; Butler (yellow card) 47'; Reed (yellow card) 49'; Kent (yellow card) 90'	Report	Okenabirhie 37'; Butler; (yellow card) 44'; Smith (yellow card) 45+1'; Lokilo (yellow card) 48'; Richards 59'	Stadium: Weston Homes Stadium; Attendance: 0 Referee: Scott Oldham

1 May 2021 45	Peterborough United	3–3	Lincoln City	Peterborough
15:00 BST	Taylor (yellow card) 55'; Dembélé 65'; Clarke-Harris 75', 90+6' (pen.), (yellow card) 90+6'	Report	Scully 31', 53'; Grant 45+2' (pen.), (yellow card) 90+8'; Bridcutt (yellow card) 56'; Montsma (yellow card) 90+5'; McGrandles (yellow card) 90+8'	Stadium: Weston Homes Stadium; Attendance: 0 Referee: John Busby

9 May 2021 46	Doncaster Rovers	1–4	Peterborough United	Doncaster
12:00 BST	John-Jules 90+1'	Report	Eisa 6'; Mason 8'; Kanu 16'; Jones 39'	Stadium: Keepmoat Stadium; Attendance: 0 Referee: Peter Wright

=== FA Cup ===
The draw for the first round was made on Monday 26, October. The second round draw was revealed on Monday, 9 November by Danny Cowley.

Win Draw Loss

8 November 2020 First round	Oxford United	1–2	Peterborough United	Oxford
15:00 GMT	Long (yellow card) 12'; Ruffels 45+2'; Shodipo (yellow card) 55'	Report	Dembele 23'; Taylor 61'; Hamilton (yellow card) 75'	Stadium: Kassam Stadium; Attendance: 0 Referee: Benjamin Speedie

28 November 2020 Second round	Peterborough United	1–2	Chorley	Peterborough
17:30 GMT	Taylor 2'		Hall 60'; Baines 63'	Stadium: Weston Homes Stadium; Attendance: 0 Referee: Darren Drysdale

=== EFL Cup ===
Win Draw Loss

The first round draw was made on 18 August, live on Sky Sports, by Paul Merson.

5 September 2020 First round	Peterborough United	0–1	Cheltenham Town	Peterborough
15:00 BST	Thompson (yellow card) 38'	Report	Thomas (yellow card) 26'; Sercombe 59'	Stadium: Weston Homes Stadium; Attendance: 0 Referee: Alan Young

=== EFL Trophy ===
Win Draw Loss

The regional group stage draw was confirmed on 18 August. The second round draw was made by Matt Murray on 20 November, at St Andrew's. The third round was made on 10 December 2020 by Jon Parkin.

Pos	Div	Team	Pld	W	PW	PL	L	GF	GA	GD	Pts	Qualification
1	L2	Cambridge United	3	2	1	0	0	7	3	+4	8	Advance to Round 2
2	L1	Peterborough United	3	1	1	1	0	8	6	+2	6	Advance to Round 2
3	L1	Burton Albion	3	0	1	1	1	6	8	−2	3	
4	ACA	Fulham U21	3	0	0	1	2	3	7	−4	1	

Source: EFL.com

8 September 2020 Group stage	Peterborough United	3–3 (5–4 p)	Burton Albion	Peterborough
19:00 BST	Clarke 3'; Reed 23' (yellow card) 90'; Mason 68'; Hamilton (yellow card) 90+6'	Report	Lawless 44'; Powell 52', 55'; Wallace (yellow card) 77'	Stadium: Weston Homes Stadium; Attendance: 0 Referee: Will Finnie
	Penalties
	Burrows (penalty scored); Hamilton (penalty scored); Reed (penalty scored); Eisa (penalty scored); Clarke (penalty scored)		Bostwick (penalty scored); Fox (penalty scored); Powell (penalty scored); O'Toole (penalty scored); Gilligan (penalty missed)

6 October 2020 Group stage	Peterborough United	4–2	Fulham U21's	Peterborough
18:00 BST	Eisa 24'; Szmodics 48'; Clarke 56'; Boyd 76'	Report	Harris 52'; Tiehl 72'	Stadium: Weston Homes Stadium; Attendance: 0 Referee: Trevor Kettle

10 November 2020 Group stage	Cambridge United	1–1 (3–1 p)	Peterborough United	Cambridge
19:00 GMT	Dunk (yellow card) 25'; Worman 86'; Knowles (yellow card) 90+4'	Report	Clarke 49' (yellow card) 85'; Blake-Tracy (yellow card) 77'	Stadium: Abbey Stadium; Attendance: 0 Referee: John Busby
	Penalties
	Dunk (penalty scored); Knowles (penalty scored); Dallas (penalty scored)		Burrows (penalty missed); Hamilton (penalty scored); Tasdemir (penalty missed); Eisa (penalty missed)

8 December 2020 Second round	Peterborough United	3–0	West Ham United U21	Peterborough
19:00 GMT	Eisa 56', 83'; Tasdemir 71'	Report	Longelo (yellow card) 31'; Chesters (yellow card) 61'; Dawson (yellow card) 68'; Yarmolenko (yellow card) 70'	Stadium: Weston Homes Stadium; Referee: Paul Howard

12 January 2021 Third round	Peterborough United	5–1	Portsmouth	Peterborough
19:00 GMT	Taylor 15'; Beevers (yellow card) 20'; Clarke-Harris 29'; Kent 45+1'; Dembele 52'; Hamilton 87'	Report	Harrison 90+2'	Stadium: Weston Homes Stadium; Attendance: 0 Referee: Robert Lewis

2 February 2021 Quarter-final	Tranmere Rovers	2–1	Peterborough United	Birkenhead
19:00 GMT	Lloyd 38'; Lewis 82'	Report	Clarke-Harris 90+1' (pen.)	Stadium: Prenton Park; Attendance: 0 Referee: Sam Barrott
