= Frazer Blake-Tracy =

English footballer (born 1995)

Personal information
- Full name: Frazer John Blake-Tracy
- Date of birth: 10 September 1995 (age 31)
- Height: 1.83 m (6 ft 0 in)
- Position: Left back

Team information
- Current team: Mansfield Town
- Number: 20

Senior career*
Years	Team	Apps	(Gls)
2015–2016	Dereham Town	46	(2)
2016–2017	Lowestoft Town	43	(1)
2017–2019	King's Lynn Town	83	(1)
2019–2021	Peterborough United	23	(0)
2021–2023	Burton Albion	7	(0)
2022–2023	→ Swindon Town (loan)	24	(1)
2023–2024	Swindon Town	48	(2)
2024–	Mansfield Town	69	(1)
- * Club domestic league appearances and goals as of 21:02, 10 November 2026 (UTC)

Frazer John Blake-Tracy (born 10 September 1995) is an English professional footballer who plays as a left back for EFL League One club Mansfield Town.

== Career ==
=== Non-League career ===
Blake-Tracy made 46 league appearances for Dereham Town in the 2015–16 season before moving to then Ryman Premier side Lowestoft Town on 4 July 2016. Blake-Tracy signed for King's Lynn Town in the summer of 2017. He went on to make 98 appearances in all competitions, scoring 2 goals.

=== Peterborough United ===
On 1 July 2019, EFL League One side Peterborough United signed Blake-Tracy on a 2-year deal. The left-back made his debut away to Oxford United on 10 August, replacing Dan Butler at half time. On 11 May 2021 it was announced that he would leave the club at the end of his contract.

=== Burton Albion ===
On 18 June 2021 it was announced that he would sign for Burton Albion following the expiry of his Peterborough contract on 1 July.

=== Swindon Town ===
In August 2022 he moved on loan to Swindon Town. The transfer was made permanent in January 2023. He was released by the club at the end of the 2023–24 season.

=== Mansfield Town ===
On 3 June 2024, Blake-Tracy agreed to join newly promoted League One side Mansfield Town on a two-year deal.

== Career statistics ==
As of match played 10 November 2026

Appearances and goals by club, season and competition
Club	Season	League			FA Cup		EFL Cup		Other		Total	
Club	Season	Division	Apps	Goals	Apps	Goals	Apps	Goals	Apps	Goals	Apps	Goals
Dereham Town	2015–16	Isthmian League	46	2	1	0	—		5	0	52	2
Lowestoft Town	2016–17	Isthmian League	43	1	1	0	—		5	2	49	3
King's Lynn Town	2017–18	Southern League Premier Division	42	0	0	0	—		6	0	48	0
King's Lynn Town	2018–19	Southern League Premier Division	41	1	0	0	—		9	1	50	2
King's Lynn Town	Total		83	1	0	0	0	0	15	1	98	2
Peterborough United	2019–20	League One	14	0	1	0	1	0	1	0	17	0
Peterborough United	2020–21	League One	9	0	2	0	0	0	4	0	15	0
Peterborough United	Total		23	0	3	0	1	0	5	0	32	0
Burton Albion	2021–22	League One	7	0	0	0	1	0	3	0	11	0
Burton Albion	2022–23	League One	0	0	0	0	0	0	0	0	0	0
Burton Albion	Total		7	0	0	0	1	0	3	0	11	0
Swindon Town (loan)	2022–23	League Two	24	1	0	0	0	0	0	0	24	1
Swindon Town	2022–23	League Two	9	0	0	0	0	0	0	0	9	0
Swindon Town	2023–24	League Two	39	2	1	0	1	0	0	0	41	2
Swindon Town	Total		48	2	1	0	1	0	0	0	50	2
Mansfield Town	2024–25	League One	18	0	2	0	0	0	1 (Note: Appearance(s) in the EFL Trophy)	0	21	0
Mansfield Town	2025–26	League One	40	1	5	0	2	0	3	0	50	1
Mansfield Town	2026–27	League One	11	0	1	0	1	0	3	0	16	0
Mansfield Town	Total		69	1	8	0	3	0	7	0	87	1
Career total			343	8	14	0	6	0	40	3	412	11
