= Northampton Academy =

Location
- Wellingborough Road Northampton NN3 8NH; England; 52°15′30″N 0°50′01″W

Information
- School type: Academy
- Mottoes: The best in everyone Our Differences Unite Us
- Established: 2004
- Trust: United Learning
- Department for Education URN: 134814 Tables
- Ofsted: Reports
- Chair of Governors: Jacob Reeves
- Interim Principal: Julian Smith
- Gender: Mixed
- Age: 11 to 18
- Enrolment: 1719
- Houses: Abington; Derngate; Franklins; Rockingham; Silverstone
- Colour: Blue
- Slogan: An Academy of Character and Excellence
- Publication: Prospectus Newsletters
- Website: http://www.northampton-academy.org

Northampton Academy is a mixed secondary school and sixth form in Northampton, Northamptonshire for students aged 11 to 18. Since September 2004, it has been an Academy, part of United Learning, a subsidiary of the United Church Schools Trust (UCST). It includes a special Nucleus STEM programme as well as Elite Sports Academies, covering both football and netball and a new Spotlight Performing Arts Academy. The School moved from their old site utilising both Lings Upper and Emanuel Middle school sites into their new, state of the art site in January 2006, where they have been located ever since. The school has been rated Outstanding by Ofsted standards from its inspection back in 2023.

== Houses ==
The school operates a house system, which was introduced in September 2025, consisting of five houses: Abington (orange), Rockingham (blue), Franklin (green), Derngate (purple), and Silverstone (red), each named after a notable location in Northamptonshire. Abington is named after Abington Park, a well-known public park with a museum and lake; Rockingham is named after Rockingham Castle, a historic Norman castle; Franklin is named after Franklin's Gardens, a rugby stadium and home of Northampton Saints; Derngate is named after 78 Derngate, a notable building redesigned by Charles Rennie Mackintosh; and Silverstone is named after Silverstone Circuit, a world-famous motor racing circuit that hosts the British Grand Prix.

== Notable former pupils ==
- Slowthai - Rapper
- Chantelle Cameron - Professional boxer
- Thakgalo Leshabela - footballer for South Shields F.C
- Benjamin Mensah - footballer for Peterborough Sports F.C
