= Flynn Clarke =

Scottish footballer

Personal information
- Full name: Flynn Clarke
- Date of birth: 19 December 2002 (age 23)
- Place of birth: Peterborough, England
- Position: Midfielder

Team information
- Current team: Lowestoft Town

Youth career
- 2011–2019: Peterborough United

Senior career*
Years	Team	Apps	(Gls)
2019–2021	Peterborough United	4	(0)
2021–2024	Norwich City	0	(0)
2022	→ Walsall (loan)	0	(0)
2023–2024	→ Dagenham & Redbridge (loan)	2	(0)
2024	→ Scunthorpe United (loan)	5	(1)
2024–	Lowestoft Town	9	(2)

International career
2022–	Scotland U21	1	(1)
- * Club domestic league appearances and goals as of 13:53, 6 October 2024 (UTC)

Flynn Clarke (born 19 December 2002) is a semi-professional footballer who plays as a midfielder for Lowestoft Town and the Scotland U21 national team.

== Career ==
Clarke joined the Peterborough United academy at the age of 9. The midfielder featured for a Posh XI in a pre-season friendly against Deeping Rangers in July 2019, before making the bench in EFL Cup ties against both Northampton Town and Arsenal U21s. He went on to sign his first professional contract on his seventeenth birthday, with manager Darren Ferguson stating Clarke "was someone that [he] really liked. He plays as a 10 predominantly, is a good size, an athlete and can get you a goal." He made his first team debut in a 1-0 loss to Cheltenham Town in the first round of the EFL Cup in September 2020. In his second appearance for Peterborough, an EFL Trophy tie against Burton Albion, he scored his first goal for the club. His league debut came in Peterborough's opening game against Accrington Stanley in September 2020.

He was selected for the Scotland under-19 squad in October 2020.

On 24 June 2021, Clarke signed for Norwich City for an undisclosed fee. Clarke went into the Norwich City under-23s team for the 2021/22 season and impressed in the Premier League 2 scoring twice in the opening 10 games from central midfield. He also netted twice in a 3–1 win over Reading in the Premier League Cup in January 2022.

On 11 July 2022, Clarke joined EFL League Two club Walsall on a season-long loan. He was recalled from his loan in September after making three appearances for Walsall.

On 2 September 2023, Clarke joined National League club Dagenham & Redbridge on a season-long loan.

On 13 February 2024, following his release from prison, Clarke joined National League North club Scunthorpe United on loan until the end of the season.

He signed for Lowestoft Town in August 2024. A club director told the BBC that Clarke deserved a "second chance" following his release from prison. On 28 September 2024, Clarke broke his tibia and sustained ligament damage in an FA Cup third round qualifying game against Haringey Borough.

== Personal life ==
On 15 September 2023, Clarke was sentenced to twelve months imprisonment for dangerous driving after injuring three people in a car crash in Thorney, Cambridgeshire in April 2022.

Clarke was disqualified from driving for 30 months. Clarke's barrister, Tommy Dominguez KC, said the crash had occurred due to a "momentary lapse of concentration" and added that Clarke had shown "significant remorse".

Clarke was released from prison on an electronically monitored tag under a Home Detention Curfew in December 2023, having served three months of his sentence.

== Career statistics ==
As of match played 9 March 2024

Appearances and goals by club, season and competition
Club	Season	League			FA Cup		EFL Cup		Other		Total	
Club	Season	Division	Apps	Goals	Apps	Goals	Apps	Goals	Apps	Goals	Apps	Goals
Peterborough United	2019–20	League One	0	0	0	0	0	0	0	0	0	0
Peterborough United	2020–21	League One	4	0	1	0	1	0	5 (Note: Appearance(s) in EFL Trophy)	3	11	3
Peterborough United	Total		4	0	1	0	1	0	5	3	11	3
Walsall (loan)	2022–23	League Two	0	0	—		2	0	1	0	3	0
Dagenham & Redbridge (loan)	2023–24	National League	2	0	0	0	—		0	0	2	0
Scunthorpe United (loan)	2023–24	National League North	2	1	—		—		0	0	2	1
Career total			8	1	1	0	3	0	6	3	18	4
