= 2019–20 Peterborough United F.C. season =

Peterborough United
2019–20 season
- Chairman: Darragh MacAnthony
- Manager: Darren Ferguson
- Stadium: London Road Stadium
- League One: 7th (on PPG)
- FA Cup: Third round
- EFL Cup: First round
- EFL Trophy: Second round
- Top goalscorer: League: Ivan Toney (24); All: Ivan Toney (26)
- Highest home attendance: 10,071 (17 August 2019 v Ipswich Town)
- Lowest home attendance: 2,310 (4 December 2019 v Ipswich Town (EFL Trophy)
- Average home league attendance: 7,371
Home colours	Away colours	Third colours

The 2019–20 Peterborough United F.C. season was the club's 60th year in the Football League and their seventh consecutive season in the third tier, League One. Along with League One, the club also participated in the FA Cup, EFL Cup and EFL Trophy. The season covered the period from 1 July 2019 to 30 June 2020.

== Squad ==
No.	Name	Pos.	Nat.	Place of Birth	Age	Apps	Goals	Signed from	Date signed	Fee	Ends
Goalkeepers
1	Christy Pym	GK	(England)	Exeter	25	42	0	Exeter City	1 July 2019	Free	2022
25	Conor O'Malley	GK	(Republic of Ireland)	Westport	24	34	0	St Patrick's Athletic	7 August 2017	Undisclosed	2020
26	Aaron Chapman	GK	(England)	Rotherham	30	39	0	Accrington Stanley	1 July 2018	Free	2020
Defenders
3	Dan Butler	LB	(England)	Cowes	25	36	2	Newport County	1 July 2019	Free	2022
5	Mark Beevers	CB	(England)	Barnsley	30	37	0	Bolton Wanderers	1 July 2019	Free	2022
6	Frankie Kent	CB	(England)	Romford	24	34	2	Colchester United	1 July 2019	Undisclosed	2022
15	Nathan Thompson	RB	(England)	Chester	29	19	0	Portsmouth	16 August 2019	Free	2021
16	Rhys Bennett	CB	(England)	Ashton-in-Makerfield	28	63	4	Mansfield Town	1 July 2018	Free	2020
18	Frazer Blake-Tracy	LB	(England)	Dereham	24	17	0	King's Lynn Town	1 July 2019	Undisclosed	2021
24	Niall Mason	RB	(England)	Brighton	23	37	0	Free Agent	1 July 2019	Free	2021
30	Sam Cartwright	CB	(England)	St Neots	19	2	0	Academy	1 July 2017	Free	2022
Midfielders
8	Josh Knight	CM	(England)	Fleckney	22	34	3	Leicester City	2 August 2019	Loan	2020
9	Sammie Szmodics	AM	(England)	Colchester	24	10	4	Bristol City	16 January 2020	Loan	2020
12	Reece Brown	CM	(England)	Dudley	24	11	0	Huddersfield Town	3 January 2020	Loan	2020
14	Louis Reed	CM	(England)	Barnsley	22	65	2	Sheffield United	1 July 2018	Undisclosed	2021
20	Serhat Tasdemir	RM	(Azerbaijan) (England)	Blackburn	19	16	0	AFC Fylde	1 July 2019	Undisclosed	2022
21	George Boyd	RM	(Scotland) (England)	Chatham	34	320	75	Sheffield Wednesday	15 July 2019	Free	2021
23	Joe Ward	LW	(England)	Chelmsford	22	104	10	Woking	10 January 2018	Undisclosed	2021
29	Jack Taylor	CM	(England)	Hammersmith	22	11	2	Barnet	7 January 2020	£500,000	Undisclosed
32	Harrison Burrows	AM	(England)	Murrow	18	10	0	Academy	13 January 2019	Trainee	2021
Forwards
7	Mohamed Eisa	CF	(Sudan)	Khartoum	25	35	16	Bristol City	1 July 2019	Undisclosed	2023
10	Siriki Dembélé	LW	(Scotland)		23	76	13	Grimsby Town	1 July 2018	Undisclosed	2021
17	Ivan Toney	CF	(England)	Northampton	24	94	49	Newcastle United	9 August 2018	Undisclosed	Undisclosed
27	Idris Kanu	CF	(England)	London	24	37	1	Aldershot Town	1 August 2017	Undisclosed	2023
37	Ricky Jade-Jones	CF	(England)	Peterborough	17	16	4	Academy	8 November 2019	Trainee	2020
Out on loan
2	Jason Naismith	RB	(Scotland)	Paisley	26	51	1	Ross County	1 July 2018	Undisclosed	2021
4	Alex Woodyard	CM	(England)	Gravesend	27	70	0	Lincoln City	1 July 2018	Undisclosed	2020
11	Marcus Maddison	LW/AM	(England)	Durham	24	249	62	Gateshead	27 August 2014	£250,000	2020
19	George Cooper	AM	(England)	Warrington	23	42	5	Crewe Alexandra	18 January 2018	Undisclosed	2021
22	Mark O'Hara	CM	(Scotland)	Barrhead	24	29	4	Dundee	1 July 2018	Undisclosed	2021
31	Kyle Barker	CM	(England)		19	4	0	Academy	25 March 2019	Trainee	2021
	Callum Cooke	AM	(England)	Peterlee	23	20	1	Middlesbrough	30 July 2018	Free	2020

=== Statistics ===
As of 13 March 2020

No.	Pos	Nat	Player	Total		League One		FA Cup		League Cup		League Trophy	
No.	Pos	Nat	Player	Apps	Goals	Apps	Goals	Apps	Goals	Apps	Goals	Apps	Goals
1	GK	(England) ENG	Christy Pym	42	0	35+0	0	4+0	0	1+0	0	2+0	0
3	DF	(England) ENG	Dan Butler	36	2	26+3	2	4+0	0	0+0	0	3+0	0
5	DF	(England) ENG	Mark Beevers	37	0	32+0	0	4+0	0	1+0	0	0+0	0
6	DF	(England) ENG	Frankie Kent	34	2	28+0	1	3+0	1	1+0	0	1+1	0
7	FW	(Sudan) SDN	Mohamed Eisa	35	16	27+2	14	4+0	2	1+0	0	0+1	0
8	DF	(England) ENG	Josh Knight	25	3	17+7	3	0+0	0	1+0	0	0+0	0
9	FW	(England) ENG	Sammie Szmodics	10	4	10+0	4	0+0	0	0+0	0	0+0	0
10	FW	(Scotland) SCO	Siriki Dembélé	29	6	11+13	5	0+1	0	0+0	0	4+0	1
12	MF	(England) ENG	Reece Brown	11	0	10+0	0	1+0	0	0+0	0	0+0	0
14	MF	(England) ENG	Louis Reed	29	1	23+1	1	3+0	0	1+0	0	1+0	0
15	DF	(England) ENG	Nathan Thompson	19	0	12+3	0	3+0	0	0+0	0	1+0	0
16	DF	(England) ENG	Rhys Bennett	18	0	7+6	0	1+0	0	0+0	0	4+0	0
17	FW	(England) ENG	Ivan Toney	37	26	32+0	24	4+0	2	1+0	0	0+0	0
18	DF	(England) ENG	Frazer Blake-Tracy	18	0	11+3	0	1+0	0	1+0	0	1+1	0
20	MF	(Azerbaijan) AZE	Serhat Tasdemir	15	0	1+9	0	0+1	0	1+0	0	3+0	0
21	MF	(Scotland) SCO	George Boyd	24	0	17+5	0	1+0	0	1+0	0	0+0	0
23	MF	(England) ENG	Joe Ward	35	5	18+9	3	1+2	0	0+1	0	4+0	2
24	DF	(England) ENG	Niall Mason	36	0	25+5	0	2+2	0	0+1	0	1+0	0
26	GK	(England) ENG	Aaron Chapman	2	0	0+0	0	0+0	0	0+0	0	2+0	0
27	FW	(England) ENG	Idris Kanu	10	1	1+5	0	0+0	0	0+0	0	4+0	1
28	DF	(England) ENG	Bobby Copping	1	0	0+0	0	0+0	0	0+0	0	0+1	0
29	MF	(England) ENG	Jack Taylor	11	2	11+0	2	0+0	0	0+0	0	0+0	0
30	DF	(England) ENG	Sam Cartwright	2	0	0+0	0	0+0	0	0+0	0	2+0	0
32	MF	(England) ENG	Harrison Burrows	10	0	2+2	0	2+0	0	0+1	0	3+0	0
33	MF	(England) ENG	Flynn Clarke	1	0	0+0	0	0+0	0	0+0	0	0+1	0
34	MF	(England) ENG	Archie Jones	1	0	0+0	0	0+0	0	0+0	0	0+1	0
36	DF	(Ghana) GHA	Benjamin Mensah	1	0	0+0	0	0+0	0	0+0	0	0+1	0
37	MF	(England) ENG	Ricky-Jade Jones	16	4	2+9	0	0+2	2	0+0	0	2+1	2
Players out on loan:
2	DF	(Scotland) SCO	Jason Naismith	1	0	0+0	0	0+0	0	1+0	0	0+0	0
4	MF	(England) ENG	Alex Woodyard	19	0	8+6	0	2+1	0	0+0	0	2+0	0
11	MF	(England) ENG	Marcus Maddison	26	10	19+3	9	4+0	1	0+0	0	0+0	0
31	MF	(England) ENG	Kyle Barker	4	0	0+0	0	0+1	0	0+0	0	3+0	0

==== Goals record ====
As of 5 January 2020

Rank	No.	Nat.	Po.	Name	League One	FA Cup	League Cup	League Trophy	Total
1	17	(England)	CF	Ivan Toney	24	2	0	0	26
2	7	(Sudan)	CF	Mohamed Eisa	14	2	0	0	16
3	11	(England)	LM	Marcus Maddison	9	1	0	0	10
4	10	(Scotland)	LW	Siriki Dembélé	5	0	0	1	6
5	23	(England)	LW	Joe Ward	3	0	0	2	5
6	9	(England)	AM	Sammie Szmodics	4	0	0	0	4
6	37	(England)	CF	Ricky Jade-Jones	0	2	0	2	4
8	8	(England)	CB	Josh Knight	3	0	0	0	3
9	3	(England)	LB	Dan Butler	2	0	0	0	2
9	6	(England)	CB	Frankie Kent	1	1	0	0	2
9	29	(England)	CM	Jack Taylor	2	0	0	0	2
12	14	(England)	CM	Louis Reed	1	0	0	0	1
12	27	(England)	CF	Idris Kanu	0	0	0	1	1
Total					66	8	0	6	80

==== Disciplinary record ====
As of 13 March 2020

Rank	No.	Nat.	Po.	Name	League One			FA Cup			League Cup			League Trophy			Total		
Rank	No.	Nat.	Po.	Name	Booked	(yellow card) (yellow-red card)	Sent off (straight red)	Booked	(yellow card) (yellow-red card)	Sent off (straight red)	Booked	(yellow card) (yellow-red card)	Sent off (straight red)	Booked	(yellow card) (yellow-red card)	Sent off (straight red)	Booked	(yellow card) (yellow-red card)	Sent off (straight red)
1	17	(England)	CF	Ivan Toney	9	0	0	1	0	0	1	0	0	0	0	0	11	0	0
2	3	(England)	LB	Dan Butler	6	0	0	1	0	0	0	0	0	1	0	0	8	0	0
2	15	(England)	RB	Nathan Thompson	4	1	0	1	0	0	0	0	0	1	0	0	6	1	0
4	24	(England)	RB	Niall Mason	5	0	0	1	0	0	1	0	0	0	0	0	7	0	0
5	4	(England)	CM	Alex Woodyard	3	0	0	2	0	0	0	0	0	0	0	0	5	0	0
5	5	(England)	CB	Mark Beevers	2	1	0	1	0	0	0	0	0	0	0	0	3	1	0
5	6	(England)	CB	Frankie Kent	2	1	0	0	0	0	1	0	0	0	0	0	3	1	0
5	8	(England)	CB	Josh Knight	5	0	0	0	0	0	0	0	0	0	0	0	5	0	0
9	14	(England)	CM	Louis Reed	1	1	0	0	0	0	0	0	0	0	0	0	1	1	0
10	7	(Sudan)	CF	Mohamed Eisa	2	0	0	0	0	0	0	0	0	0	0	0	2	0	0
10	9	(England)	AM	Sammie Szmodics	2	0	0	0	0	0	0	0	0	0	0	0	2	0	0
10	10	(Scotland)	LW	Siriki Dembélé	1	0	1	0	0	0	0	0	0	0	0	0	1	0	1
10	12	(England)	CM	Reece Brown	1	0	0	1	0	0	0	0	0	0	0	0	2	0	0
10	18	(England)	LB	Frazer Blake-Tracy	2	0	0	0	0	0	0	0	0	0	0	0	2	0	0
10	21	(Scotland)	RM	George Boyd	2	0	0	0	0	0	0	0	0	0	0	0	2	0	0
10	23	(England)	LW	Joe Ward	1	0	0	0	0	0	0	0	0	1	0	0	2	0	0
18	11	(England)	LM	Marcus Maddison	1	0	0	0	0	0	0	0	0	0	0	0	1	0	0
18	14	(England)	CM	Louis Reed	0	0	0	1	0	0	0	0	0	0	0	0	1	0	0
18	16	(England)	CB	Rhys Bennett	1	0	0	0	0	0	0	0	0	0	0	0	1	0	0
18	20	(Azerbaijan)	RM	Serhat Tasdemir	0	0	0	0	0	0	0	0	0	1	0	0	1	0	0
18	29	(England)	CM	Jack Taylor	1	0	0	0	0	0	0	0	0	0	0	0	1	0	0
18	34	(England)	RM	Archie Jones	0	0	0	0	0	0	0	0	0	1	0	0	1	0	0
Total					50	4	1	9	0	0	3	0	0	5	0	0	67	4	1

== Transfers ==
=== Transfers in ===
Date	Position	Nationality	Name	From	Fee	Ref.
1 July 2019	CB	(England)	Mark Beevers	(England) Bolton Wanderers	Free transfer	
1 July 2019	LB	(England)	Frazer Blake-Tracy	(England) King's Lynn Town	Compensation	
1 July 2019	LB	(England)	Dan Butler	(Wales) Newport County	Free transfer	
1 July 2019	CF	(Sudan)	Mohamed Eisa	(England) Bristol City	Undisclosed	
1 July 2019	CB	(England)	Frankie Kent	(England) Colchester United	Undisclosed	
1 July 2019	RB	(England)	Niall Mason	Free agent	Free transfer	
1 July 2019	GK	(England)	Christy Pym	(England) Exeter City	Free transfer	
1 July 2019	RM	(Azerbaijan)	Serhat Tasdemir	(England) AFC Fylde	Undisclosed	
15 July 2019	RM	(Scotland)	George Boyd	(England) Sheffield Wednesday	Free transfer	
16 August 2019	RB	(England)	Nathan Thompson	(England) Portsmouth	Free transfer	
1 October 2019	DF	(England)	Bobby Copping	(England) Bury	Free transfer	
7 January 2020	CM	(England)	Jack Taylor	(England) Barnet	£500,000	

=== Loans in ===
Date from	Position	Nationality	Name	From	Date until	Ref.
2 August 2019	CB	(England)	Josh Knight	(England) Leicester City	30 June 2020	
3 January 2020	CM	(England)	Reece Brown	(England) Huddersfield Town	30 June 2020	
16 January 2020	AM	(England)	Sammie Szmodics	(England) Bristol City	30 June 2020	

=== Loans out ===
Date from	Position	Nationality	Name	To	Date until	Ref.
29 July 2019	CB	(England)	Sam Cartwright	(England) Kettering Town	1 January 2020	
22 August 2019	AM	(England)	Callum Cooke	(England) Bradford City	30 June 2020	
29 August 2019	LW	(England)	George Cooper	(England) Plymouth Argyle	30 June 2020	
2 September 2019	RB	(Scotland)	Jason Naismith	(Scotland) Hibernian	30 June 2020	
2 September 2019	DM	(Scotland)	Mark O'Hara	(Scotland) Motherwell	30 June 2020	
14 December 2019	GK	(England)	Aaron Chapman	(England) Tranmere Rovers	21 December 2019	
3 January 2020	CM	(England)	Alex Woodyard	(England) Tranmere Rovers	30 June 2020	
17 January 2020	FW	(England)	Bradley Rolt	(England) Welling United	February 2020	
31 January 2020	AM	(England)	Marcus Maddison	(England) Hull City	30 June 2020	
19 February 2020	DM	(England)	Kyle Barker	(Wales) Wrexham	30 June 2020	

=== Transfers out ===
Date	Position	Nationality	Name	To	Fee	Ref.
1 July 2019	LB	(England)	Lewis Freestone	(England) Brighton & Hove Albion	Released	
1 July 2019	CM	(Scotland)	Darren Lyon	Free agent	Released	
1 July 2019	CF	(England)	Morgan Penfold	(England) Barrow	Released	
1 July 2019	LW	(Scotland)	Luke Strachan	(Scotland) Dundee	Free transfer	
1 July 2019	CB	(England)	Ryan Tafazolli	(England) Hull City	Released	
25 July 2019	CB	(Cameroon)	Sébastien Bassong	(Greece) Volos	Free transfer	
27 July 2019	CF	(England)	Matty Stevens	(England) Forest Green Rovers	Undisclosed	
6 August 2019	CF	(England)	Matt Godden	(England) Coventry City	£750,000	
3 September 2019	RW	(England)	Isaac Buckley-Ricketts	Free agent	Mutual consent	

== Pre-season ==
The Posh announced pre-season friendlies against St Mirren, Stamford, Kettering Town, Stevenage, Barnet Grimsby Town and Deeping Rangers.

6 July 2019 Friendly	St Mirren	0–2	Peterborough United	Cartagena, Spain
19:00 CEST		Report	Toney 4'; Eisa 36'	Stadium: La Manga Club Resort

10 July 2019 Friendly	Stamford	0–6	Peterborough United	Stamford
19:30 BST		Report	Stevens 26'; Burrows 31'; Mason 32'; Toney 59', 67'; Tasdemir 76'	Stadium: The Zeeco Stadium

13 July 2019 Friendly	Kettering Town	1–2	Peterborough United	Burton Latimer
15:00 BST	Meikle 53'	Report	Eisa 44'; Toney 54'	Stadium: Latimer Park

16 July 2019 Friendly	Stevenage	1–1	Peterborough United	Stevenage
19:45 BST	Sonupe 10'	Report	Eisa 72'	Stadium: Lamex Stadium

20 July 2019 Friendly	Barnet	1–3	Peterborough United	Canons Park
15:00 BST	Toney 35'; Dembélé 55'; Tasdemir 64'	Report	Akinola 26'	Stadium: The Hive Stadium; Attendance: 634

23 July 2019 Friendly	Bedford Town	0–3	Peterborough United	Cardington
19:30 BST		Report	Tasdemir 20', 45'; Stevens 22'	Stadium: The Eyrie

24 July 2019 Friendly	Reading	4–2	Peterborough United	Reading
16:00 BST	Blackett 20'; Barrow 38'; Swift 52'; Barrett 61'	Report	Toney 43'; Eisa 50'	Stadium: Madejski Stadium

27 July 2019 Friendly	Grimsby Town	0–2	Peterborough United	Cleethorpes
15:00 BST		Report	Eisa 21'; Dembélé 74'	Stadium: Blundell Park

29 July 2019 Friendly	Deeping Rangers	1–8	Peterborough United XI	Market Deeping
19:30 BST	Mooney 23'	Report	Kanu 3', 65'; Eisa 29'; Cooper 45', 53', 61', 72'; Rolt 79'	Stadium: The Haydon Whitham Stadium

== Competitions ==
=== League One ===
==== League table ====
Pos	Team	Pld	W	D	L	GF	GA	GD	Pts	PPG	Promotion, qualification or relegation
3	Wycombe Wanderers (O, P)	34	17	8	9	45	40	+5	59	1.74	Qualification for League One play-offs (Note: Four teams play for one spot and promotion to the EFL Championship.)
4	Oxford United	35	17	9	9	61	37	+24	60	1.71	Qualification for League One play-offs
5	Portsmouth	35	17	9	9	53	36	+17	60	1.71	Qualification for League One play-offs
6	Fleetwood Town	35	16	12	7	51	38	+13	60	1.71	Qualification for League One play-offs
7	Peterborough United	35	17	8	10	68	40	+28	59	1.69	
8	Sunderland	36	16	11	9	48	32	+16	59	1.64	
9	Doncaster Rovers	34	15	9	10	51	33	+18	54	1.59	
10	Gillingham	35	12	15	8	42	34	+8	51	1.46	
11	Ipswich Town	36	14	10	12	46	36	+10	52	1.44	

Source: EFL Official Website
Rules for classification: 1) Points per game; 2) Goal difference; 3) Number of goals scored; 4) Head-to-head results; 5) Wins; 6) Away goals; 7) Penalty points (sec 9.5); 8) 12-point sending-off offences
(O) Play-off winners; (P) Promoted

==== Results summary ====
Overall								Home						Away					
Pld	W	D	L	GF	GA	GD	Pts	W	D	L	GF	GA	GD	W	D	L	GF	GA	GD
35	17	8	10	68	40	+28	59	12	3	2	41	13	+28	5	5	8	27	27	0

Last updated: 7 March 2020.
Source: BBC

==== Results by matchday ====
Matchday	1	2	3	4	5	6	7	8	9	10	11	12	13	14	15	16	17	18	19	20	21	22	23	24	25	26	27	28	29	30	31	32	33	34	35
Ground	H	A	H	A	A	H	H	A	A	H	A	H	A	H	H	A	A	H	A	H	A	H	A	A	H	A	H	H	A	A	H	H	A	A	H
Result	L	L	D	W	W	W	W	D	L	W	D	W	W	W	D	L	L	W	D	W	D	L	L	L	D	L	W	W	W	W	W	W	L	D	W
Position	20	21	20	15	10	7	6	6	9	8	7	3	3	1	3	3	3	3	3	3	2	4	6	6	9	10	8	5	4	3	3	2	4	7	6

Updated to match(es) played on 7 March 2020. Source: Statto.com
A = Away; H = Home; W = Win; D = Draw; L = Loss

==== Matches ====
On Thursday, 20 June 2019, the EFL League One fixtures were revealed.

3 August 2019 1	Peterborough United	1–3	Fleetwood Town	Peterborough
15:00 BST	Toney 67' (yellow card) 90+3'	Report	Souttar 4'; Morris 13'; Coutts (yellow card) 51'; Biggins (yellow card) 66'; Coyle (yellow card) 78'; Andrew 81'; Hunter (yellow card) 84'; Madden (yellow card) 89'; Cairns (yellow card) 90+1'	Stadium: Weston Homes Stadium; Attendance: 7,958; Referee: Robert Lewis

10 August 2019 2	Oxford United	1–0	Peterborough United	Oxford
15:00 BST	Brannagan 12', (yellow card) 16'; Gorrin (yellow card) 56'; Mousinho (yellow card) 76'	Report	Boyd (yellow card) 18'; Kent (yellow card) 43'	Stadium: Kassam Stadium; Attendance: 6,959; Referee: Michael Salisbury

17 August 2019 3	Peterborough United	2–2	Ipswich Town	Peterborough
15:00 BST	Toney 29'; Eisa 62'; Kent (yellow card) 65'; Knight (yellow card) 73'; Mason (yellow card) 90'	Report	Norwood 4' (penalty missed) 66'; Kenlock (yellow card) 73'; Chambers 90+4'	Stadium: London Road Stadium; Attendance: 10,071; Referee: Martin Coy

20 August 2019 4	Southend United	0–2	Peterborough United	Southend-on-Sea
19:45 BST		Report	Eisa 55'; Toney 57'	Stadium: Roots Hall; Attendance: 5,890; Referee: Alan Young

24 August 2019 5	Milton Keynes Dons	0–4	Peterborough United	Denbigh
15:00 BST	Boateng (yellow card) 62'; Harley (yellow card) 90+3'	Report	Maddison 21'; Toney 28'; Eisa 40', 72'	Stadium: Stadium MK; Attendance: 9,402; Referee: Andy Davies

31 August 2019 6	Peterborough United	3–0	Sunderland	Peterborough
15:00 BST	Maddison 36', 64'; Toney (yellow card) 51'; Knight 52'	Report	McLaughlin (yellow card) 30'; Wyke (yellow card) 57' (yellow-red card) 77'; O'Nien (red card) 71'; Power (yellow card) 84'; Leadbitter (yellow card) 89'	Stadium: Weston Homes Stadium; Attendance: 10,005; Referee: Craig Hicks

7 September 2019	Shrewsbury Town	v	Peterborough United	Shrewsbury
15:00 BST		Report		Stadium: Montgomery Waters Meadow
Note: The match was postponed on 30 August 2019, due to international call-ups.

14 September 2019 7	Peterborough United	6–0	Rochdale	Peterborough
15:00 BST	Toney 18', 45', 58'; Eisa 34'; Maddison 51', 62'	Report		Stadium: Weston Homes Stadium; Attendance: 5,733; Referee: Craig Hicks

17 September 2019 8	Tranmere Rovers	2–2	Peterborough United	Birkenhead
19:45 BST	Ridehalgh 65'; Banks 70'	Report	Eisa 54'; Toney 56'	Stadium: Prenton Park; Attendance: 5,243; Referee: Tom Nield

21 September 2019 9	Doncaster Rovers	2–0	Peterborough United	Doncaster
15:00 BST	Coppinger 30'; Sadlier 39'; Ennis (yellow card) 41'; Gomes (yellow card) 90+3'	Report		Stadium: Keepmoat Stadium; Attendance: 8,940; Referee: Ross Joyce

28 September 2019 10	Peterborough United	3–2	AFC Wimbledon	Peterborough
15:00 BST	Maddison 29'; Eisa 41', 66'	Report	Appiah (yellow card) 23'; Delaney (yellow card) 33'; O'Neill (yellow card) 38'; Reilly (yellow card) 44'; Wordsworth (yellow card) 50' (goal) 78'; Pinnock 52'	Stadium: Weston Homes Stadium; Attendance: 6,744; Referee: Sebastian Stockbridge

5 October 2019 11	Wycombe Wanderers	3–3	Peterborough United	High Wycombe
15:00 BST	Thompson (yellow card) 4' (yellow-red card) 83'; Akinfenwa 56', 90+5' (pen.); Pym 63' (o.g.)	Report	Eisa 10'; Maddison (yellow card) 25'; Knight 38'; Blake-Tracy (yellow card) 66'; Toney 70' (yellow card) 90+4'	Stadium: Adams Park; Referee: Will Finnie

12 October 2019 12	Peterborough United	2–0	Lincoln City	Peterborough
15:00 BST	Mason (yellow card) 62'; Reed (yellow card) 72' (yellow-red card) 90' (goal) 82'; Toney 88'	Report	O'Connor (yellow card) 45+2'; Pett (yellow card) 74'; Shackell (yellow card) 79'	Stadium: Weston Homes Stadium; Attendance: 9,872; Referee: Marc Edwards

19 October 2019 13	Gillingham	1–2	Peterborough United	Gillingham
15:00 BST	Ehmer (yellow card) 46'; Byrne (yellow card) 51'; Mandron 80'; Ogilvie (yellow card) 88'	Report	Ward 40'; Eisa 51' (pen.); Knight (yellow card) 66'	Stadium: Priestfield Stadium; Attendance: 6,269; Referee: Charles Breakspear

23 October 2019 14	Peterborough United	4–0	Accrington Stanley	Peterborough
19:45 BST	Maddison 56'; Toney 69' (yellow card) 78'; Kent 85'; Dembélé 90+5'	Report	McConville (yellow card) 45+4'; Johnson (yellow card) 67'	Stadium: West Homes Stadium; Attendance: 5,843

26 October 2019 15	Peterborough United	2–2	Coventry City	Peterborough
15:00 BST	Mason (yellow card) 21'; Blake-Tracy (yellow card) 23'; Maddison 52' (pen.); Knight (yellow card) 57'; Eisa 90+5'	Report	Bakayoko 12'; McCallum (yellow card) 14'; Dabo (yellow card) 43'; McFadzean (yellow card) 51'; Rose (yellow card) 82'; Biamou 85'	Stadium: Weston Homes Stadium; Attendance: 8,005; Referee: Alan Young

2 November 2019 16	Blackpool	4–3	Peterborough United	Blackpool
15:00 BST	Mason (o.g.) 27'; Spearing (yellow card) 37'; Gnanduillet 41', 47' (pen.); Butler (o.g.) 74'	Report	Eisa 13'; Butler (yellow card) 21'; Toney 45'; Maddison 71' (pen.)	Stadium: Bloomfield Road; Attendance: 7,619; Referee: James Oldham

5 November 2019 17	Shrewsbury Town	1–0	Peterborough United	Shrewsbury
19:45 GMT	Ebanks-Landell 45+1'; Edwards (yellow card) 54'; Thompson (yellow card) 77'; Murphy (yellow card) 90+3'	Report	Toney (yellow card) 42'; Bennett (yellow card) 45+1'; Maddison (penalty missed) 53'; Butler (yellow card) 88'	Stadium: Montgomery Waters Meadow; Attendance: 4,890; Referee: Darren Handley

23 November 2019 18	Peterborough United	1–0	Burton Albion	Peterborough
15:00 GMT	Ward (yellow card) 64' (goal) 90+1'	Report	Edwards (yellow card) 53'; O'Hara (yellow card) 84'	Stadium: Weston Homes Stadium; Attendance: 6,462; Referee: Will Finnie

7 December 2019 19	Portsmouth	2–2	Peterborough United	Milton
15:00 GMT	Brown 26' (yellow card) 66'; Harrison 52' (yellow card) 77'; Burgess (yellow card) 53'	Report	Woodyard (yellow card) 2'; Toney 10'; Eisa (yellow card) 44' (goal) 72'; Thompson (yellow card) 68'	Stadium: Fratton Park; Attendance: 17,643; Referee: Charles Breakspear

14 December 2019 20	Peterborough United	1–0	Bolton Wanderers	Peterborough
15:00 GMT	Toney 23'			Stadium: Weston Homes Stadium; Attendance: 6,965; Referee: Peter Wright

21 December 2019 21	Bristol Rovers	0–0	Peterborough United	Horfield
15:00 GMT	Kilgour (yellow card) 52'; Clarke (yellow card) 68'; Craig (yellow card) 82'	Report	Butler (yellow card) 47'	Stadium: Memorial Stadium; Attendance: 8,030; Referee: John Busby

26 December 2019 22	Peterborough United	0–3	Doncaster Rovers	Peterborough
15:00 GMT	Toney (yellow card) 43'; Woodyard (yellow card) 44'	Report	Sadlier 17' 61'; Whiteman (yellow card) 44' (goal) 82'; Wright (yellow card) 71'; James (yellow card) 75'; Dieng (yellow card) 76'; John (yellow card) 90+5'	Stadium: London Road; Attendance: 6,786; Referee: David Rock

29 December 2019 23	Rotherham United	4–0	Peterborough United	Rotherham
15:00 GMT	Wood 50'; Butler 68' (o.g.); Ward 77' (o.g.); Vassell 90+2'; Mattock (red card) 73'		Kent (yellow card) 47' (yellow-red card) 54'	Stadium: New York Stadium; Attendance: 9,019; Referee: Andy Haines

1 January 2020 24	Lincoln City	2–1	Peterborough United	Lincoln
15:00 GMT	Hesketh (yellow card) 61'; Walker 67'; Morrell (yellow card) 71'; Bolger (yellow card) 80'; Grant 90'; Payne (yellow card) 90+5'	Report	Toney 28'; Mason (yellow card) 37'; Boyd (yellow card) 45'; Woodyard (yellow card) 55'; Dembélé (red card) 71'; Butler (yellow card) 90+6'	Stadium: Sincil Bank; Attendance: 10,025; Referee: Christopher Sarginson

4 January 2020	Peterborough United	v	Wycombe Wanderers	Peterborough
15:00 GMT		Report		Stadium: Weston Homes Stadium
Note: The match was postponed on 2 December, due to the club's involvement in the FA Cup.

11 January 2020 25	Peterborough United	0–0	Gillingham	Peterborough
15:00 GMT	Beevers (yellow card) 52' (yellow-red card) 87'	Report		Stadium: Weston Homes Stadium; Attendance: 6,696; Referee: Kevin Johnson

18 January 2020 26	AFC Wimbledon	1–0	Peterborough United	Norbiton
15:00 GMT	Pigott 58'; Trott (yellow card) 78'	Report	Szmodics (yellow card) 74'; Toney (yellow card) 85'	Stadium: Cherry Red Records Stadium; Attendance: 4,453; Referee: Darren Drysdale

21 January 2020 27	Peterborough United	4–0	Wycombe Wanderers	Peterborough
19:45 GMT	Toney 23' (pen.), 73'; Butler (yellow card) 26'; Taylor (yellow card) 40' (goal) 56'; Dembélé 44'; Beevers (yellow card) 61'	Report	Phillips (red card) 21'; Bloomfield (yellow card) 45+2'	Stadium: Weston Homes Stadium; Attendance: 3,851; Referee: Charles Breakspear

25 January 2020 28	Peterborough United	2–1	Rotherham United	Peterborough
15:00 GMT	Toney 2'; Szmodics 22' (yellow card) 64'	Report	Ihiekwe 35'; Wiles (yellow card) 49'	Stadium: Weston Homes Stadium; Attendance: 7,495; Referee: Scott Oldham

28 January 2020 29	Accrington Stanley	0–2	Peterborough United	Accrington
19:45 GMT	Zanzala (yellow card) 72'	Report	Szmodics 11'; Butler (yellow card) 18'; Thompson (yellow card) 48'; Ward 51'	Stadium: Wham Stadium; Attendance: 1,816; Referee: Anthony Backhouse

1 February 2020 30	Ipswich Town	1–4	Peterborough United	Ipswich
15:00 GMT	Edwards (yellow card) 77'; Norwood 79' (pen.); Skuse (yellow card) 90+2'	Report	Toney 23' (pen.); Szmodics 33', 74'; Dembélé 50'; Butler (yellow card) 65'; Knight (yellow card) 67'	Stadium: Portman Road; Attendance: 21,351; Referee: Andy Woolmer

8 February 2020 31	Peterborough United	4–0	Oxford United	Peterborough
15:00 GMT	Dembélé 36'; Toney 56', 77'; Knight 90+6'; Thompson (yellow card) 44' (yellow-red card) 63'	Report		Stadium: Weston Homes Stadium; Attendance: 8,363; Referee: Andy Haines

11 February 2020 32	Peterborough United	4–0	Southend United	Peterborough
19:45 GMT	Toney (yellow card) 45+1' (goal) 70', 74'; Dembélé 50'; Taylor 57'	Report	McLaughlin (yellow card) 28'; Mantom (yellow card) 48'; Bwomono (yellow card) 71'; Milligan (yellow card) 78'; Demetriou (yellow card) 80'	Stadium: Weston Homes Stadium; Attendance: 5,036; Referee: Carl Boyeson

15 February 2020 33	Fleetwood Town	2–1	Peterborough United	Fleetwood
15:00 GMT	McKay (yellow card) 2'; Cairns (yellow card) 7'; Connolly 15'; Burns 76'	Report	Eisa (penalty missed) 8'; Butler 54'; Thompson (yellow card) 73'	Stadium: Highbury Stadium; Attendance: 2,801; Referee: Martin Coy

29 February 2020 34	Burton Albion	1–1	Peterborough United	Burton upon Trent
15:00 GMT	O'Toole (yellow card) 29'; Brayford 65'	Report	Eisa 52'; Dembélé (yellow card) 61'; Thompson (yellow card) 70'	Stadium: Pirelli Stadium; Attendance: 3,795; Referee: Brett Huxtable

7 March 2020 35	Peterborough United	2–0	Portsmouth	Peterborough
15:00 GMT	Butler 32'; Brown (yellow card) 41'; Toney 86'	Report	Whatmough (yellow card) 15'; Cannon (yellow card) 79'; Naylor (yellow card) 82'; Raggett (yellow card) 90+3'; Marquis (yellow card) 90+4'	Stadium: Weston Homes Stadium; Attendance: 9,414; Referee: Oliver Yates

14 March 2020	Bolton Wanderers	v	Peterborough United	Horwich
15:00 GMT				Stadium: University of Bolton Stadium
Note: Season was suspended until 3 April 2020, due to the COVID-19 pandemic.

21 March 2020	Peterborough United	v	Bristol Rovers	Peterborough
15:00 GMT				Stadium: Weston Homes Stadium
Note: Season was suspended until 3 April 2020, due to the COVID-19 pandemic.

29 March 2020	Peterborough United	v	Blackpool	Peterborough
15:30 GMT				Stadium: Weston Homes Stadium
Note: Season was suspended until 3 April 2020, due to the COVID-19 pandemic.

4 April 2020	Coventry City	v	Peterborough United	Bordesley
15:00 GMT				Stadium: St Andrew's Trillion Trophy Stadium
Note: On 3 April, the English Football League decided to postpone all football until safe to do so due to the COVID-19 pandemic.

10 April 2020	Peterborough United	v	Milton Keynes Dons	Peterborough
15:00 BST				Stadium: Weston Homes Stadium
Note: On 3 April, the English Football League decided to postpone all football until safe to do so due to the COVID-19 pandemic.

13 April 2020	Sunderland	v	Peterborough United	Sunderland
13:00 BST				Stadium: Stadium of Light
Note: On 3 April, the English Football League decided to postpone all football until safe to do so due to the COVID-19 pandemic.

18 April 2020	Peterborough United	v	Shrewsbury Town	Peterborough
15:00 BST				Stadium: Weston Homes Stadium
Note: On 3 April, the English Football League decided to postpone all football until safe to do so due to the COVID-19 pandemic.

25 April 2020	Rochdale	v	Peterborough United	Spotland
15:00 BST				Stadium: Crown Oil Arena
Note: On 3 April, the English Football League decided to postpone all football until safe to do so due to the COVID-19 pandemic.

3 May 2020	Peterborough United	v	Tranmere Rovers	Peterborough
15:00 BST				Stadium: Weston Homes Stadium
Note: On 3 April, the English Football League decided to postpone all football until safe to do so due to the COVID-19 pandemic.

=== FA Cup ===
The first round draw was made on 21 October 2019. The second round draw was made live on 11 November from Chichester City's stadium, Oaklands Park. The third round draw was made live on BBC Two from Etihad Stadium, Micah Richards and Tony Adams conducted the draw.

9 November 2019 First round	Stevenage	1–1	Peterborough United	Stevenage
15:00 GMT	Watts (yellow card) 6'; List 56'; Stokes (yellow card) 81'	Report	Thompson (yellow card) 24'; Butler (yellow card) 47'; Maddison 79'; Woodyard (yellow card) 81'	Stadium: The Lamex Stadium; Attendance: 2,981; Referee: Nick Kinseley

19 November 2019 First round replay	Peterborough United	2–0	Stevenage	Peterborough
19:45 GMT	Eisa 11'; Toney (yellow card) 55'; Jones 90+4'	Report	Fernandez (yellow card) 56'	Stadium: Weston Homes Stadium; Attendance: 3,593; Referee: Ollie Yates

1 December 2019 Second round	Peterborough United	3–0	Dover Athletic	Peterborough
14:00 GMT	Toney 7'; Beevers (yellow card) 35'; Reed (yellow card) 67'; Kent 79'; Eisa 84'; Woodyard (yellow card) 90+1'; Mason (yellow card) 90+4'	Report	Cumberbatch (yellow card) 38'; Rooney (yellow card) 90'; Munns (yellow card) 90+6'	Stadium: Weston Homes Stadium; Attendance: 4,239; Referee: Brett Huxtable

4 January 2020 Third round	Burnley	4–2	Peterborough United	Burnley
15:00 GMT	Rodriguez 8', 52'; Pieters 15'; Hendrick 23'	Report	Toney 39'; Jade-Jones 76'	Stadium: Turf Moor; Attendance: 8,043; Referee: Robert Jones

=== EFL Cup ===
The first round draw was made on 20 June.

13 August 2019 First round	Oxford United	1–0	Peterborough United	Oxford
19:45 BST	Long (yellow card) 55'; Brannagan 88'	Report	Kent (yellow card) 25'; Toney (yellow card) 64'; Mason (yellow card) 87'	Stadium: Kassam Stadium; Attendance: 2,798; Referee: Ollie Yates

=== EFL Trophy ===
On 9 July 2019, the pre-determined group stage draw was announced with Invited clubs to be drawn on 12 July 2019. The draw for the second round was made on 16 November 2019 live on Sky Sports.

Pos	Div	Team	Pld	W	PW	PL	L	GF	GA	GD	Pts	Qualification
1	L1	Peterborough United	3	3	0	0	0	5	1	+4	9	Advance to Round 2
2	L2	Northampton Town	3	1	1	0	1	2	3	−1	5	Advance to Round 2
3	ACA	Arsenal U21	3	0	1	1	1	2	3	−1	3	
4	L2	Cambridge United	3	0	0	1	2	2	4	−2	1	

Source: EFL.com

3 September 2019 Group stage	Northampton Town	0–2	Peterborough United	Northampton
19:30 BST	Wharton (yellow card) 29'	Report	Kanu 21'; Dembélé 24'; Thompson (yellow card) 63'	Stadium: PTS Academy Stadium; Attendance: 2,234; Referee: Joshua Smith

1 October 2019 Group stage	Peterborough United	1–0	Arsenal U21	Peterborough
19:30 BST	Ward (yellow card) 45+1' (goal) 66'	Report	Mavropanos (yellow card) 25'; M.Smith (yellow card) 71'	Stadium: Weston Homes Stadium; Attendance: 3,131; Referee: Chris Sarginson

12 November 2019 Group stage	Peterborough United	2–1	Cambridge United	Peterborough
19:30 GMT	Ward 9'; R. Jones 30'; A.Jones (yellow card) 83'	Report	Norville-Williams (yellow card) 77'; Knibbs 79'; Smith (yellow card) 90'	Stadium: Weston Homes Stadium; Attendance: 3,425; Referee: Christopher Pollard

4 December 2019 Second round	Peterborough United	1–1 (5–6 p)	Ipswich Town	Peterborough
19:30 GMT	Jones 32'; Tasdemir (yellow card) 37'; Butler (yellow card) 85'	Report	El Mizouni 23'; Smith (yellow card) 59'; Huws (yellow card) 71'; Roberts (yellow card) 85'	Stadium: Weston Homes Stadium; Attendance: 2,310; Referee: Graham Salisbury
	Penalties
	Eisa (penalty scored); Toney (penalty scored); Dembélé (penalty missed); Butler (penalty scored); Mason (penalty scored); Barker (penalty scored); Kent (penalty missed)		Roberts (penalty scored); McGavin (penalty missed); Kenlock (penalty scored); El Mizouni (penalty scored); Norwood (penalty scored); Huws (penalty scored); Cotter (penalty scored)
