= Serhat Tasdemir =

Footballer (born 2000)

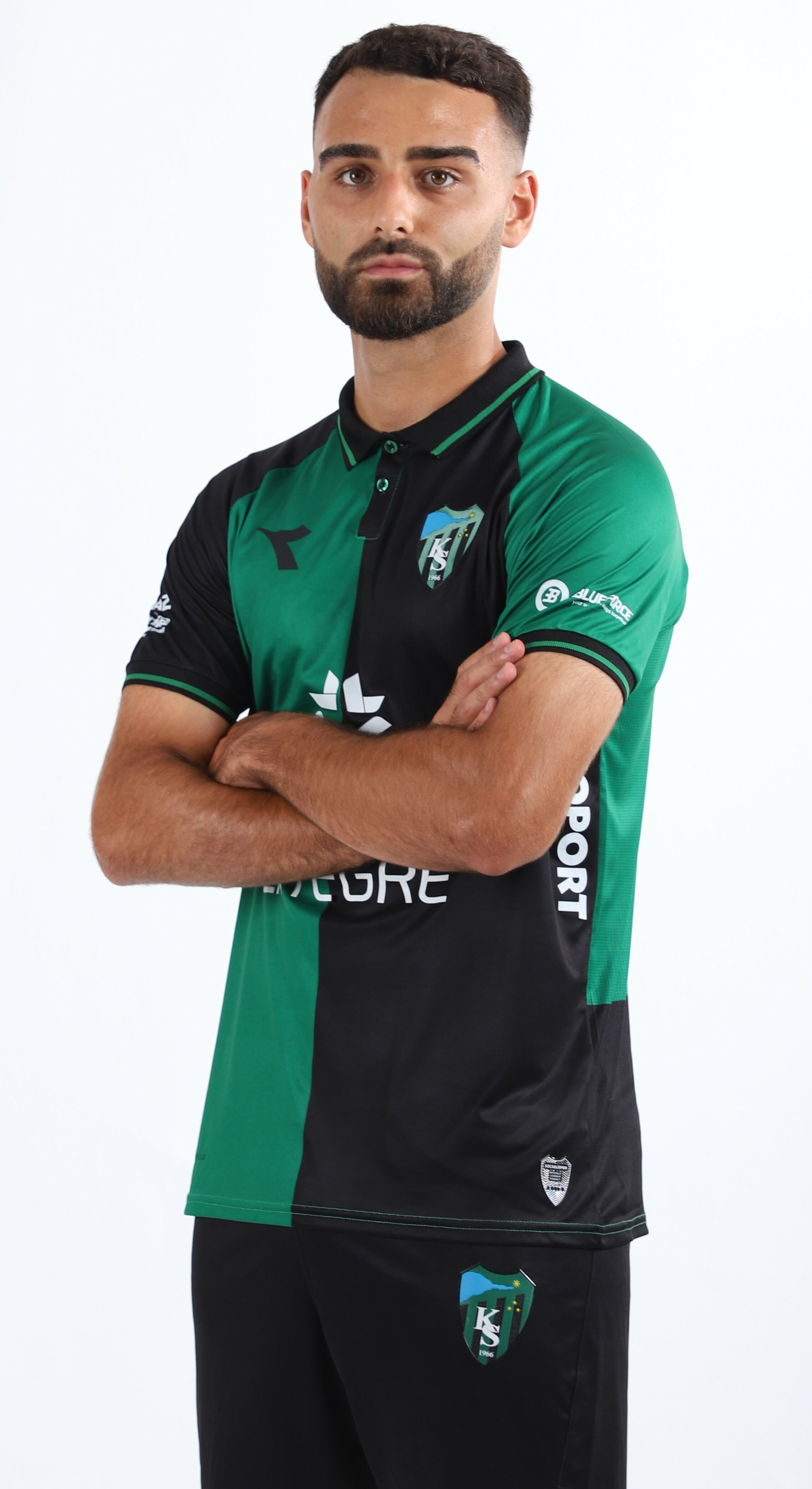

Personal information
- Full name: Serhat Dogukan Tasdemir
- Date of birth: 21 July 2000 (age 26)
- Place of birth: Blackburn, England
- Height: 5 ft 11 in (1.80 m)
- Position: Attacking midfielder

Team information
- Current team: Kırklarelispor

Youth career
- –2016: Blackburn Rovers
- 2016–2017: AFC Fylde

Senior career*
Years	Team	Apps	(Gls)
2017–2019	AFC Fylde	54	(8)
2019–2022	Peterborough United	10	(0)
2021	→ Oldham Athletic (loan)	7	(0)
2021–2022	→ Barnet (loan)	19	(2)
2022–2023	Buxton	10	(2)
2023–2024	Kocaelispor	2	(0)
2023–2024	→ Zonguldak Kömürspor (loan)	29	(5)
2024–	Kırklarelispor	18	(1)

International career^{‡}
2019	Azerbaijan U19	3	(0)
- * Club domestic league appearances and goals as of 21:17, 27 December 2025 (UTC) ‡ National team caps and goals as of 12:18, 12 August 2019 (UTC)

Serhat Dogukan Tasdemir (born 21 July 2000) is a professional footballer who plays as an attacking midfielder for TFF Second League side Kırklarelispor. Born in England, he has represented Azerbaijan at youth level.

== Club career ==
Tasdemir signed for AFC Fylde at the age of 15, following his release from Blackburn Rovers. He made his first-team debut at just 16 in the Lancashire FA Challenge Trophy vs A.F.C. Darwen, scoring a first-half hat trick. Following this, Tasdemir made his National League debut against Bromley, in September 2017, aged 17. He scored just 14 minutes after coming off of the bench.

On 1 July 2019, EFL League One side Peterborough United signed Tasdemir on a 3-year deal for a six-figure undisclosed fee. Tasdemir made his debut in an EFL Cup match against Oxford United on 13 August 2019, making his league debut four days later against Ipswich Town. He scored his first goal for Peterborough in an EFL Trophy tie against West Ham United U21s on 8 December 2020.

He moved on loan to Oldham Athletic on 1 February 2021.

On 11 May 2021 he was made available for transfer by Peterborough. Tasdemir joined Barnet on a season-long loan in July 2021. He scored three times in 23 appearances for the Bees. Tasdemir was released by Posh at the end of the 2021–22 season.

He signed for Buxton for the 2022–23 season. After 11 appearances, he signed for Kocaelispor on a two-and-a-half year contract on 18 January 2023. He later played for Zonguldak Kömürspor and Kırklarelispor.

== International career ==
After being called up by Azerbaijan U19 in January 2019, Tasdemir marked his debut in a friendly fixture against the Krasnodar Region with a goal. Tasdemir went on to feature in three UEFA European Under-19 Championship qualifying games, starting against the Republic of Ireland and Romania and coming off the bench against Russia.

== Career statistics ==
As of end of 2023-24 season

Appearances and goals by club, season and competition
Club	Season	League			FA Cup		EFL Cup		Other		Total	
Club	Season	Division	Apps	Goals	Apps	Goals	Apps	Goals	Apps	Goals	Apps	Goals
AFC Fylde	2016–17	National League North	1	0	0	0	—		0	0	1	0
AFC Fylde	2017–18	National League	26	4	1	0	—		1 (Note: Appearance(s) in the FA Trophy.)	1	28	5
AFC Fylde	2018–19	National League	27	4	1	0	—		6	5	34	9
AFC Fylde	Total		54	8	2	0	—		7	6	63	14
Peterborough United	2019–20	League One	10	0	1	0	1	0	4 (Note: Appearance(s) in the EFL Trophy.)	0	16	0
Peterborough United	2020–21	League One	0	0	0	0	0	0	4	1	4	1
Peterborough United	Total		10	0	1	0	1	0	8	1	20	1
Oldham Athletic (loan)	2020–21	League Two	7	0	0	0	0	0	0	0	7	0
Barnet (loan)	2021–22	National League	19	2	0	0	0	0	4 (Note: One appearance in the FA Trophy, three appearances and one goal in the Middlesex Senior Cup.)	1	23	3
Buxton	2022–23	National League North	10	2	1	0	0	0	0	0	11	2
Kocaelispor	2022–23	TFF Second League	1	0	0	0	0	0	0	0	1	0
Kocaelispor	2023–24	TFF First League	1	0	0	0	0	0	0	0	1	0
Kocaelispor	Total		2	0	0	0	0	0	0	0	2	0
Zonguldak Kömürspor (loan)	2023–24	TFF Second League	29	5	0	0	0	0	0	0	29	5
Kırklarelispor	2024–25	TFF Second League	0	0	0	0	0	0	0	0	0	0
Career total			131	17	4	0	1	0	18	8	153	25
