= Archie Jones =

English footballer

Personal information
- Full name: Archie Joseph Jones
- Date of birth: 17 January 2002 (age 24)
- Position: Midfielder

Team information
- Current team: Real Bedford

Youth career
- Peterborough United

Senior career*
Years	Team	Apps	(Gls)
2019–2021	Peterborough United	0	(0)
2020	→ Bishop's Stortford (loan)	4	(1)
2021–2022	Bishop's Stortford		
2022	→ Spalding United (loan)		
2022–2023	Spalding United		
2023–2023	Bishop's Stortford	0	(0)
2023-	Real Bedford	27	(7)
- * Club domestic league appearances and goals as of 17:22, 31 December 2023

Archie Joseph Jones (born 13 July 2001) is an English professional footballer who plays as a midfielder for club Real Bedford.

== Career ==
On 12 November 2019, after progressing through the club's academy, Jones made his debut for Peterborough United in a 2–1 EFL Trophy win against rivals Cambridge United. Jones appeared on the bench in a 4-0 EFL League One defeat to Rotherham United in December 2019.

On 11 May 2021 it was announced that he would leave Peterborough at the end of his contract.

In July 2022, Jones returned to Spalding United on a permanent basis following a loan spell the previous season.

On 4 July 2023, Jones returned to newly promoted National League North club Bishop's Stortford.

On 25 August 2023, it was announced that Bitcoin-backed Spartan South Midlands Premier Division side Real Bedford F.C. had signed Jones from Bishop's Stortford on a permanent basis. As of September 2026, Real Bedford have been promoted up to the Southern Premier League Central with Jones a key player to their climb.

== Career statistics ==
As of 13 December 2019.

Appearances and goals by club, season and competition
Club	Season	League			FA Cup		League Cup		Other		Total	
Club	Season	Division	Apps	Goals	Apps	Goals	Apps	Goals	Apps	Goals	Apps	Goals
Peterborough United	2019–20	League One	0	0	0	0	0	0	1 (Note: Appearance(s) in the Football League Trophy)	0	1	0
Peterborough United	2020–21	League One	0	0	0	0	0	0	0	0	0	0
Career total			0	0	0	0	0	0	1	0	1	0
