= Khanya Leshabela =

South African footballer (born 1999)

Personal information
- Full name: Thakgalo Khanya Leshabela
- Date of birth: 18 September 1999 (age 27)
- Place of birth: Soshanguve, South Africa
- Height: 1.75 m (5 ft 9 in)
- Position: Midfielder

Team information
- Current team: South Shields F.C

Youth career
- 2008–2009: Parklands Tigers
- 2009–2013: Gregory Celtics
- 2013–2021: Leicester City

Senior career*
Years	Team	Apps	(Gls)
2021–2023	Leicester City	1	(0)
2021–2022	→ Shrewsbury Town (loan)	3	(0)
2022–2023	→ Crewe Alexandra (loan)	10	(0)
2024	Cape Town City	8	(0)
2024	Enfield Town	10	(0)
2024–2025	Spalding United	12	(0)
2025	Bedford Town	?	(?)
2025–2026	AFC Telford United	27	(2)
2026–	South Shields FC	10	(0)

International career
2019	South Africa U20	3	(0)
- * Club domestic league appearances and goals as of 18 October 2026

Thakgalo Khanya Leshabela (born 18 September 1999) is a South African soccer player who plays as a midfielder for National League North club AFC Telford United.

Born in Soshanguve, South Africa, Leshabela grew up in Northampton, England. He started his career at Leicester City where he signed his first professional contract in January 2019 before making his Premier League debut in March 2021.

== Early life ==
Leshabela was born in the township of Soshanguve, near Pretoria, though his parents were originally from Limpopo. At the age of 2, Leshabela moved from South Africa to Northampton, England. He was educated at Northampton Academy.

== Club career ==
He began his career with the academies of Parklands Tigers and Gregory Celtics, before moving to Leicester City in 2013. He signed a three-and-a-half-year professional contract with the club in January 2019. Leshabela made his Premier League debut with Leicester as an 81st-minute substitute during a 5–0 victory against Sheffield United on 14 March 2021. Following his debut, manager Brendan Rodgers praised Leshabela, stating that "he's a young player who has worked very hard", adding that "he has got qualities and he came into the game and showed a nice confidence".

On 19 August 2021, Leshabela joined EFL League One club Shrewsbury Town on a season-long loan. He made his League One debut on 21 August 2021 as a 71st-minute substitute during a 0–3 defeat against Plymouth Argyle. After struggling for game time, manager Steve Cotterill said that Leshabela's loan had been a 'punt' and his position at the club would be reassessed in the January transfer window. On 27 January 2022, his loan spell was terminated.

On 26 July 2022, Leshabela joined EFL League Two club Crewe Alexandra on a six-month loan deal, and made a substitute appearance in Crewe's opening game of the 2022–23 season, a 2–1 victory over Rochdale at Spotland on 30 July 2022. He made his first Crewe start on 9 August 2022, playing in an EFL League Cup first round defeat at Grimsby Town.

In February 2024, Leshabela returned to his native South Africa to sign for Cape Town City. He made his debut in the against SuperSport United.

In August 2024, Leshabela returned to England, joining National League South side Enfield Town. In March 2025, he joined Southern League Premier Division Central side Bedford Town following a spell with Spalding United.

== International career ==
Leshabela has represented South Africa at under-20 level, having played at the 2019 Africa U-20 Cup of Nations and the 2019 FIFA U-20 World Cup.

== Style of play ==
Leshabela plays primarily as a winger but can also play as an attacking midfielder. In August 2019, Leicester City manager Brendan Rodgers praised Leshabela, stating that "he's dynamic, he is physical, he has good fitness, a nice touch of the ball and he has an understanding of how to play the game tactically, which is very important."

== Career statistics ==
As of 31 August 2022.

Appearances and goals by club, season and competition
Club	Season	League			FA Cup		League Cup		Other		Total	
Club	Season	Division	Apps	Goals	Apps	Goals	Apps	Goals	Apps	Goals	Apps	Goals
Leicester City U21	2017–18	-	0	0	0	0	0	0	1 (Note: Appearances in the Football League Trophy)	0	1	0
Leicester City U21	2018–19	-	0	0	0	0	0	0	2	0	2	0
Leicester City U21	2019–20	-	0	0	0	0	0	0	6	0	6	0
Leicester City U21	2020–21	-	0	0	0	0	0	0	3	0	3	0
Leicester City	2020–21	Premier League	1	0	0	0	0	0	0	0	1	0
Leicester City	Total		1	0	0	0	0	0	12	0	13	0
Shrewsbury Town (loan)	2021–22	League One	3	0	2	0	1	0	3	0	9	0
Crewe Alexandra (loan)	2022–23	League Two	10	0	0	0	1	0	2	0	13	0
Total			14	0	2	0	2	0	17	0	35	0
