= Sam Cartwright =

English footballer

Personal information
- Full name: Samuel Elliott Cartwright
- Date of birth: 8 July 2000 (age 26)
- Place of birth: Huntingdon, England
- Height: 6 ft 3 in (1.91 m)
- Position: Centre back

Team information
- Current team: Spalding United

Youth career
- –2017: Peterborough United

Senior career*
Years	Team	Apps	(Gls)
2017–2021	Peterborough United	0	(0)
2017	→ King's Lynn Town (loan)	5	(0)
2017	→ Leatherhead (loan)	2	(0)
2018–2019	→ St Ives Town (loan)	23	(1)
2019	→ Grantham Town (loan)	4	(0)
2019	→ Kettering Town (loan)	10	(1)
2020	→ Woking (loan)	0	(0)
2021	→ Oxford City (loan)	3	(0)
2021	St Ives Town	1	(0)
2021–2025	Spalding United	125	(18)
2025–	Real Bedford	0	(0)
- * Club domestic league appearances and goals as of 11:04, 20 June 2025 (UTC)

Samuel Elliott Cartwright (born 8 July 2000) is an English footballer who plays as a defender for Southern League Premier Division Central club Real Bedford.

== Career ==
Cartwright signed his first professional contract in October 2017. Grant McCann stated "Sam is an excellent young centre half. He has taken my eye since I returned to the club, I have watched his progress through the age groups. He played a few games in pre-season and has been out on-loan at a variety of different clubs to get experience. He is someone that I believe has got a good future here." The defender has had multiple loan spells, including at St Ives Town and Kettering Town. The defender made two senior appearances for the club in 2019 in the EFL Trophy, once against Arsenal Under-21s and once against Cambridge United.

On 25 September 2020, Cartwright agreed to join National League club Woking on a short-term loan.

On 11 May 2021 it was announced that he would leave Peterborough at the end of his contract.

On 8 September 2021, Cartwright joined Spalding United, following a short-term spell back with St Ives Town.

In June 2025, Cartwright joined newly promoted Southern League Premier Division Central side Real Bedford.

== Career statistics ==
As of end of 2024–25 season

Appearances and goals by club, season and competition
Club	Season	League			FA Cup		EFL Cup		Other		Total	
Club	Season	Division	Apps	Goals	Apps	Goals	Apps	Goals	Apps	Goals	Apps	Goals
Peterborough United	2016–17	League One	0	0	0	0	0	0	0	0	0	0
Peterborough United	2017–18	League One	0	0	0	0	0	0	0	0	0	0
Peterborough United	2018–19	League One	0	0	—		0	0	0	0	0	0
Peterborough United	2019–20	League One	0	0	—		0	0	2 (Note: Appearance(s) in EFL Trophy)	0	2	0
Peterborough United	2020–21	League One	0	0	0	0	0	0	0	0	0	0
Peterborough United	Total		0	0	0	0	0	0	2	0	2	0
King's Lynn Town (loan)	2016–17	Southern League Premier Division	5	0	—		—		—		5	0
Leatherhead (loan)	2017–18	Isthmian League Premier Division	2	0	0	0	—		0	0	2	0
St Ives Town (loan)	2018–19	Southern League Premier Division Central	23	1	5	2	—		2 (Note: One appearance in Southern League Cup, one in FA Trophy)	0	30	3
Grantham Town (loan)	2018–19	Northern Premier League Premier Division	5	0	—		—		—		5	0
Kettering Town (loan)	2019–20	National League North	10	1	2	0	—		0	0	12	1
Woking (loan)	2020–21	National League	0	0	0	0	—		0	0	0	0
Oxford City (loan)	2020–21	National League South	3	0	—		—		1 (Note: Appearance in the FA Trophy)	0	4	0
St Ives Town	2021–22	Southern League Premier Division Central	1	0	0	0	—		0	0	1	0
Spalding United	2021–22	Northern Premier League Division One Midlands	27	2	0	0	—		0	0	27	2
Spalding United	2022–23	Northern Premier League Division One Midlands	36	7	2	0	—		5 (Note: Three appearances in the FA Trophy, two in the Northern Premier League Division One Midlands play-offs)	0	43	7
Spalding United	2023–24	Northern Premier League Division One Midlands	27	6	4	0	—		4	0	35	6
Spalding United	2024–25	Southern League Premier Division Central	35	3	2	0	—		1	0	38	3
Spalding United	Total		125	18	8	0	—		10	0	143	18
Career total			174	20	15	2	0	0	15	0	206	22
