= Benjamin Mensah =

Italian footballer (born 2002)

Personal information
- Full name: Benjamin Brakoh Boateng Mensah
- Date of birth: 30 December 2002 (age 23)
- Place of birth: Seriate, Italy
- Position: Right back

Team information
- Current team: Peterborough Sports

Youth career
- Aston Villa
- Peterborough United

Senior career*
Years	Team	Apps	(Gls)
2019–2023	Peterborough United	0	(0)
2023–2024	St Ives Town	11	(3)
2024	St Albans City	5	(0)
2024	Rushall Olympic	1	(0)
2024–2025	St Ives Town	32	(1)
2025–	Peterborough Sports	0	(0)
- * Club domestic league appearances and goals as of 13:11, 30 July 2025 (UTC)

Benjamin Brakoh Boateng Mensah (born 30 December 2002) is an Italian professional footballer who plays as a right back for Southern League Premier Division Central club Peterborough Sports.

== Career ==
Mensah was educated at Northampton Academy, during which time he played for Aston Villa's academy, before later joining Peterborough United. On 12 November 2019, Mensah made his debut for Peterborough in a 2–1 EFL Trophy win against rivals Cambridge United. He signed a two-and-a-half year professional contract with the club on 29 December 2020, one day before his 18th birthday. He departed the club upon the expiration of his contract at the end of the 2022–23 season.

In November 2023, Mensah joined Southern League Premier Division Central side St Ives Town. In February 2024, he made the step up to join National League South side St Albans City.

In June 2024, Mensah joined National League North side Rushall Olympic. In September 2024, he returned to St Ives Town.

In July 2025, Mensah joined National League North club Peterborough Sports following a successful trial.

== Personal life ==
Born in Seriate, Italy, Mensah is of Ghanaian descent.

== Career statistics ==
As of match played 6 December 2022

Appearances and goals by club, season and competition
Club	Season	League			FA Cup		EFL Cup		Other		Total	
Club	Season	Division	Apps	Goals	Apps	Goals	Apps	Goals	Apps	Goals	Apps	Goals
Peterborough United	2019–20	League One	0	0	0	0	0	0	1 (Note: Appearance(s) in EFL Trophy)	0	1	0
Peterborough United	2020–21	League One	0	0	0	0	0	0	3	0	3	0
Peterborough United	2021–22	Championship	0	0	0	0	0	0	0	0	0	0
Peterborough United	2022–23	League One	0	0	1	0	0	0	1	0	2	0
Career total			0	0	1	0	0	0	5	0	6	0
