= Kyle Barker =

English footballer

Personal information
- Full name: Kyle Lennon Barker
- Date of birth: 16 December 2000 (age 25)
- Place of birth: King's Lynn, England
- Position: Defensive midfielder

Team information
- Current team: Peterborough Sports
- Number: 19

Youth career
- 2013–2019: Peterborough United

Senior career*
Years	Team	Apps	(Gls)
2019–2022	Peterborough United	1	(0)
2018	→ Kettering Town (loan)	1	(0)
2019	→ Lowestoft Town (loan)	2	(0)
2020	→ Wrexham (loan)	1	(0)
2020	→ King's Lynn Town (loan)	1	(0)
2022-	Peterborough Sports		
- * Club domestic league appearances and goals as of 14:35, 9 May 2021 (UTC)

Kyle Lennon Barker (born 16 December 2000) is an English footballer who plays as a midfielder for Southern League Premier Division Central club Peterborough Sports.

== Career ==
Barker joined the Peterborough United academy at the age of 13, signing his first professional contract in March 2019. Under 18s manager Matthew Etherington stated Barker had "a lot of ability, plays the game in a certain way, [he's] very calm on the pitch as well as off it, and is very good in possession". The midfielder started against Arsenal Under-21s and Cambridge United in the EFL Trophy in 2019. Barker also appeared on the bench against Gillingham in a League One fixture in October 2019.

On 19 February 2020, Barker joined Wrexham on loan for the remainder of the 2019–20 season but would only manage one game with the club before the season ended due to the COVID-19 pandemic.

Barker would sign a new two-year deal with Peterborough in 2021. Despite this, Barker would leave the club after the end of the following season.

Barker played two matches as a trialist for Scottish Championship team Dundee in July 2022 against Montrose and Blackburn Rovers.

== Career statistics ==
As of 10 August 2021

Club	Season	League			National Cup		League Cup		Other		Total	
Club	Season	Division	Apps	Goals	Apps	Goals	Apps	Goals	Apps	Goals	Apps	Goals
Peterborough United	2019–20	EFL League One	0	0	1	0	0	0	3 (Note: Appearances in the Football League Trophy.)	0	4	0
Peterborough United	2020–21	EFL League One	1	0	0	0	0	0	2	0	3	0
Peterborough United	2021–22	EFL Championship	0	0	0	0	1	0	0	0	1	0
Peterborough United	Total		1	0	1	0	1	0	5	0	8	0
Kettering Town (loan)	2017–18	Southern Football League Premier Division	1	0	0	0	0	0	0	0	1	0
Lowestoft Town (loan)	2018–19	Southern Football League Premier Division Central	2	0	0	0	0	0	0	0	2	0
Wrexham (loan)	2019–20	National League	1	0	0	0	0	0	0	0	1	0
King's Lynn Town (loan)	2020–21	National League	1	0	0	0	0	0	0	0	1	0
Career total			6	0	1	0	1	0	5	0	13	0
