= Christy Pym =

English football goalkeeper (born 1995)

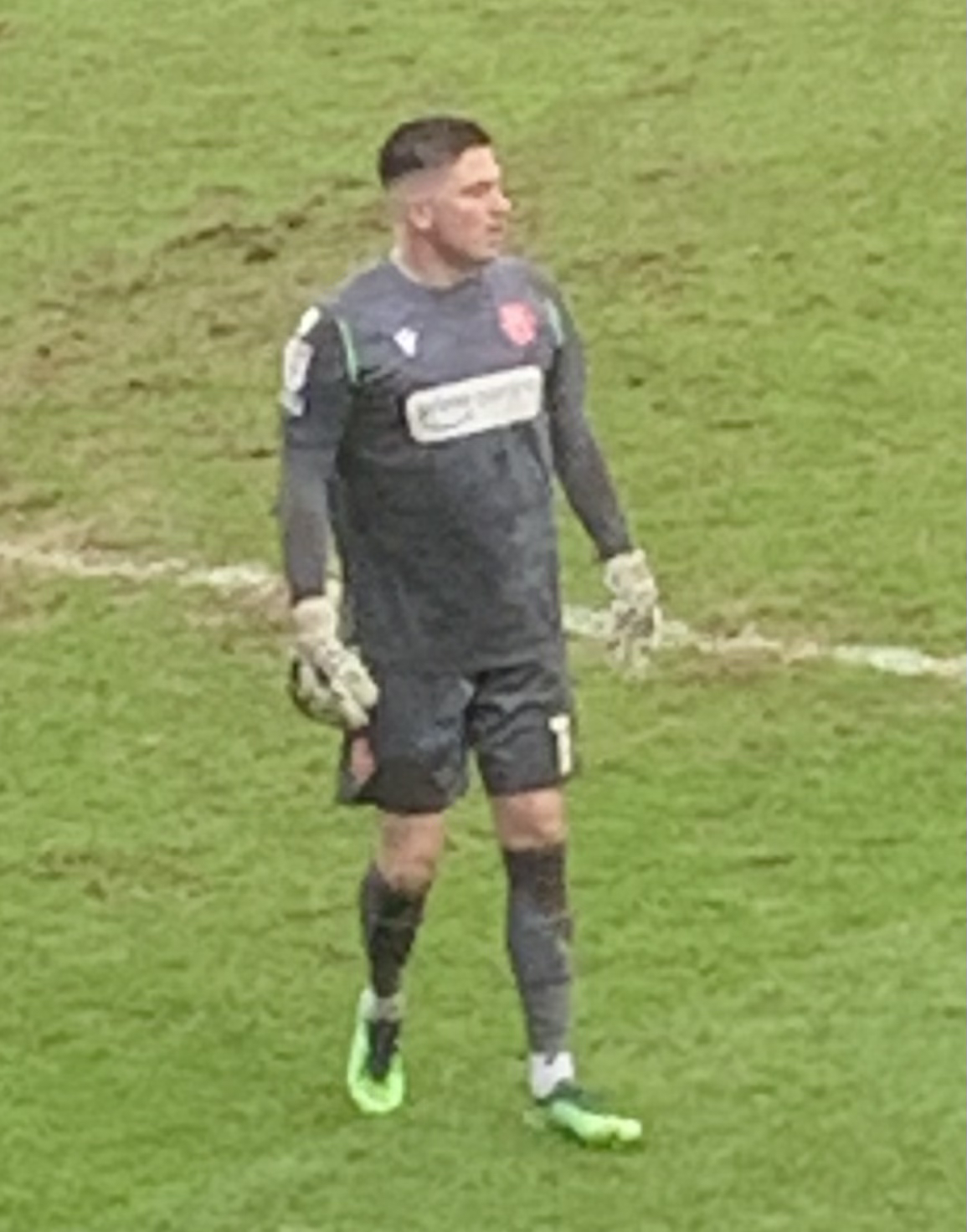
- Pym playing for Stevenage in 2022

Personal information
- Full name: Christy James Pym
- Date of birth: 24 April 1995 (age 31)
- Place of birth: Exeter, England
- Height: 6 ft 1 in (1.85 m)
- Position: Goalkeeper

Team information
- Current team: Grimsby Town
- Number: 31

Youth career
- –2012: Exeter City

Senior career*
Years	Team	Apps	(Gls)
2012–2019	Exeter City	151	(0)
2019–2023	Peterborough United	82	(0)
2022	→ Stevenage (loan)	23	(0)
2022–2023	→ Mansfield Town (loan)	42	(0)
2023–2025	Mansfield Town	84	(0)
2025–	Grimsby Town	31	(0)

International career
2014	England U20	3	(0)
- * Club domestic league appearances and goals as of 11:17, 10 November 2026 (UTC)

Christy James Pym (born 24 April 1995) is a professional footballer who plays as a goalkeeper for EFL League Two side Grimsby Town.

Pym has previously played for Exeter City, Peterborough United, Stevenage and Mansfield Town. Born in England, and having represented England U20, Pym has been called up to the Northern Ireland national team having declared to play for them in 2024.

== Club career ==
=== Exeter City ===
Pym was born in Exeter, Devon. He came through the youth ranks at his hometown club, Exeter City. Pym was captain of the under-18 team when he was handed a professional contract by manager Paul Tisdale in April 2013.

Pym made his debut for Exeter as cover for Artur Krysiak in a 3–2 victory over Southend United at Roots Hall on 15 February 2014. He went on to become first choice keeper for the last five league matches of the season and was rewarded with a new contract at the end of the season. He began the season as Exeter's first-choice goalkeeper after Artur Krysiak was released.

In 2014–15, Pym battled for starting position against fellow 19-year-old James Hamon, eventually playing 25 league games to the latter's 21. The following season, new Austrian signing Bobby Olejnik was the undisputed starting goalkeeper in league games, until Pym edged back into the line-up in October 2016.

In May 2019, Exeter manager Matt Taylor said he expected Pym to leave the club on a free transfer.

=== Peterborough United ===
Pym joined League One club Peterborough United on a free transfer on 29 May 2019, signing a three-year contract.

Pym signed for League Two club Stevenage on loan on 27 December 2021, effective from 3 January 2022, for the remainder of the 2021–22 season. The move meant Pym would be reunited with manager Paul Tisdale.

On 12 July 2022, Pym signed for Mansfield Town on a season-long loan.

=== Mansfield Town ===
On 11 July 2023, Pym joined Mansfield Town for an undisclosed fee, signing a two-year contract.

=== Grimsby Town ===
On 9 July 2025, Pym signed for League Two side Grimsby Town on a two-year deal.

On 27 August 2025, Pym played as Grimsby faced Manchester United in the second round of the EFL Cup. After the match finished 2–2, Pym saved Matheus Cunha's penalty during the resulting shootout and later converted a penalty himself as Grimsby won 12–11.

Pym subsequently suffered an injury in December 2025, prompting Grimsby to sign Jackson Smith from Barnsley on an emergency loan. After Smith kept two clean sheets in his first three appearances, his loan was extended until the end of the season. Pym returned to fitness but did not regain the starting position from Smith and made no further first-team appearances during the campaign.

On conclusion of the 2025–26 season, it was announced by the club that Pym would be available for transfer.

On 28 July 2026, Grimsby signed Harvey Cartwright on a season-long loan from Hull City. Cartwright was assigned the number-one shirt for the 2026–27 season, while Pym was given number 31. Cartwright was unavailable through injury at the beginning of the campaign and Pym returned to the starting line-up. Pym kept clean sheets in victories over Exeter City and in a goalless draw with Walsall, and was subsequently nominated for Grimsby's August Player of the Month award.

Pym suffered a thigh injury against Accrington Stanley on 1 September and was replaced at half-time. He later returned to the side and retained his league place after Cartwright recovered from injury, with the club describing Pym as having reclaimed his position in the team.

== International career ==
Born in England, Pym qualifies to play for Northern Ireland through his Belfast-born grandmother, and he is also eligible to play for the Republic of Ireland.

On 28 August 2014, Pym received his first call-up to the England under-20 team for a friendly match against Romania.

On 8 October 2024, Pym received his first call-up to the Northern Ireland national team for UEFA Nations League matches against Belarus and Bulgaria.

== Career statistics ==
As of match played 8 November 2026

Appearances and goals by club, season and competition
Club	Season	League			FA Cup		League Cup		Other		Total	
Club	Season	Division	Apps	Goals	Apps	Goals	Apps	Goals	Apps	Goals	Apps	Goals
Exeter City	2012–13	League Two	0	0	0	0	0	0	0	0	0	0
Exeter City	2013–14	League Two	9	0	0	0	0	0	0	0	9	0
Exeter City	2014–15	League Two	25	0	1	0	1	0	0	0	27	0
Exeter City	2015–16	League Two	0	0	0	0	0	0	0	0	0	0
Exeter City	2016–17	League Two	28	0	0	0	1	0	2 (Note: One appearance in EFL Trophy and one appearance in League Two play-offs)	0	31	0
Exeter City	2017–18	League Two	46	0	4	0	1	0	3 (Note: Appearance(s) in League Two play-offs)	0	54	0
Exeter City	2018–19	League Two	43	0	0	0	2	0	0	0	45	0
Exeter City	Total		151	0	5	0	5	0	5	0	166	0
Peterborough United	2019–20	League One	35	0	4	0	1	0	2 (Note: Appearance(s) in EFL Trophy)	0	42	0
Peterborough United	2020–21	League One	40	0	2	0	1	0	2	0	45	0
Peterborough United	2021–22	Championship	7	0	0	0	0	0	—		7	0
Peterborough United	2022–23	League One	0	0	0	0	0	0	0	0	0	0
Peterborough United	Total		82	0	6	0	2	0	4	0	94	0
Stevenage (loan)	2021–22	League Two	23	0	—		—		—		23	0
Mansfield Town (loan)	2022–23	League Two	42	0	2	0	1	0	0	0	45	0
Mansfield Town	2023–24	League Two	46	0	1	0	4	0	0	0	51	0
Mansfield Town	2024–25	League One	38	0	3	0	1	0	0	0	42	0
Mansfield Town	Total		84	0	4	0	5	0	0	0	93	0
Grimsby Town	2025–26	League Two	19	0	2	0	4	0	0	0	25	0
Grimsby Town	2026–27	League Two	12	0	0	0	1	0	0	0	13	0
Grimsby Town	Total		31	0	2	0	5	0	0	0	38	0
Career total			413	0	19	0	18	0	9	0	459	0

== Honours ==
Mansfield Town

- EFL League Two third-place promotion: 2023–24

Individual

- Exeter City Players' Player of the Year: 2017–18
- Exeter City Supporters' Player of the Year: 2017–18
