= Mohamed Eisa =

Sudanese footballer (born 1994)

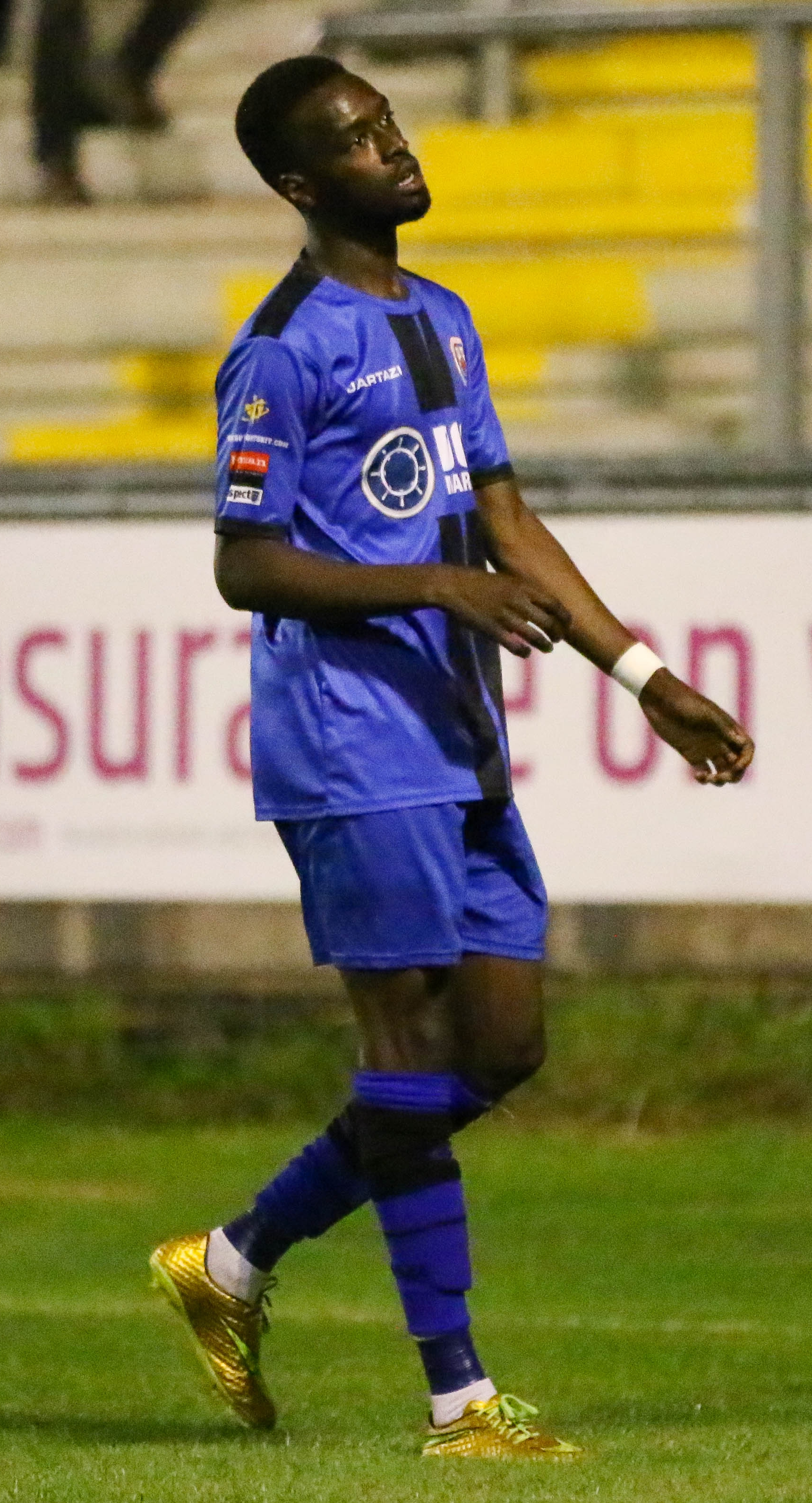
- Eisa playing for Greenwich Borough in October 2016.

Personal information
- Full name: Mohamed Mamoun Eisa
- Date of birth: 12 July 1994 (age 32)
- Place of birth: Khartoum, Sudan
- Height: 1.83 m (6 ft 0 in)
- Position: Forward

Youth career
- Pro Touch Soccer Academy

Senior career*
Years	Team	Apps	(Gls)
2012–2015	Dartford	2	(0)
2013–2014	→ Leatherhead (DR)		
2014–2015	→ VCD Athletic (loan)	2	(1)
2014–2015	→ Corinthian (DR)	18	(16)
2015–2017	Greenwich Borough	81	(52)
2017–2018	Cheltenham Town	45	(23)
2018–2019	Bristol City	5	(0)
2019–2021	Peterborough United	56	(16)
2021–2024	Milton Keynes Dons	87	(28)
2024	→ Exeter City (loan)	11	(1)
2024–2025	Nassaji Mazandaran	10	(0)
2025–2026	Uthai Thani	30	(10)

International career^{‡}
2023–	Sudan	20	(3)
- * Club domestic league appearances and goals as of 09:08, 23 September 2026 (UTC) ‡ National team caps and goals as of 18:00, 16 November 2026 (UTC)

Mohamed Mamoun Eisa (born 12 July 1994) is a Sudanese professional footballer who plays as a forward for the Sudan national team.

== Early life ==
Born in Khartoum, Sudan, Eisa's family moved to Camden, London when he was nine years old.

== Club career ==
=== Early career ===
After playing with the Pro Touch Soccer Academy, Eisa had unsuccessful trials at Norwich City, Southend United and Oxford United. He spent his early career in non-league football with Dartford, Leatherhead, VCD Athletic, Corinthian and Greenwich Borough. At Greenwich he scored 57 goals in 100 appearances in all competitions before leaving the club in June 2017.

=== Cheltenham Town ===
He signed for Cheltenham Town on 7 July 2017 on an initial one-year deal. After breaking into the first-team, in August 2017 Eisa signed a contract extension with the club until 2020. On 24 March 2018, Eisa equalled Cheltenham's record for 20 league goals in a season. On 6 April 2018, Eisa won the EFL League Two Player Of The Month Award.

During the 2017–18 season he scored 25 goals for Cheltenham Town in all competitions, including 23 in EFL League Two. His goalscoring saw him break Cheltenham's record for the most goals scored in a season. In April 2018 he was nominated for the EFL League Two Player of the Season award. At the club's end of season award, Eisa won the Supporters' Player Of The Year, Players' Player Of The Year and the Sponsors' Player Of The Year awards.

=== Bristol City ===
During the 2018 pre-season he was linked with a transfer to Brentford, Leeds United and Portsmouth. He signed for Bristol City on 23 July 2018. He made six appearances for the club.

=== Peterborough United ===
On 1 June 2019, Eisa signed a four-year deal with League One club Peterborough United for an undisclosed, club record fee. By 22 November 2019 he had scored 12 of Peterborough's 39 league goals. On 11 May 2021 he was made available for transfer by Peterborough.

=== Milton Keynes Dons ===
On 20 July 2021, Eisa joined League One club Milton Keynes Dons for an undisclosed but reportedly club-record transfer fee, signing a long-term deal. He scored his first goal for the club on his league debut in a 3–3 away fixture against Bolton Wanderers on 7 August 2021. On 16 April 2022, Eisa suffered a serious injury during a 3–2 home defeat to Sheffield Wednesday, which ruled him out for the remainder of the season and beyond. During his first season with the club he scored 12 goals in 41 appearances in all competitions.

On 30 January 2024, Eisa returned to League One, joining Exeter City on loan for the remainder of the season. Milton Keynes Dons released a statement suggesting Eisa's time with the club had come to an end having scored 31 goals in 101 appearances and thanking him for his efforts.

Eisa was released by MK Dons at the end of the 2023–24 season.

=== Nassaji Mazandaran ===
On 18 September 2024, Eisa joined Persian Gulf Pro League club Nassaji Mazandaran on a one-year deal.

=== Uthai Thani ===
In June 2025, Eisa signed for Thai League 1 side Uthai Thani. He left the club at the end of the 2025–26 season upon the expiry of his contract.

== International career ==
Eisa scored on his international debut with the Sudan national team in a 1–1 2026 FIFA World Cup qualification tie with Togo on 16 November 2023. He was replaced at half-time by his brother Abo, who was also making his international debut.

=== International goals ===
Scores and results list Sudan's goal tally first.

No.	Date	Venue	Opponent	Score	Result	Competition
1.	16 November 2023	Benina Martyrs Stadium, Benina, Libya	Togo	1–0	1–1	2026 FIFA World Cup qualification
2.	25 March 2025	Benina Martyrs Stadium, Benina, Libya	South Sudan	1–0	1–1	2026 FIFA World Cup qualification
3.	25 September 2026	Juba Stadium, Juba, Sudan	Ethiopia	1–0	1–0	2027 Africa Cup of Nations qualification

== Personal life ==
Eisa has four brothers, one of whom, Abo, is also a professional footballer. Abo has said that Mohamed has been a role model to him. A younger brother Omar is also a footballer.

== Career statistics ==
=== Club ===
As of 23 September 2026

Appearances and goals by club, season and competition
Club	Season	League			FA Cup		League Cup		Other		Total	
Club	Season	Division	Apps	Goals	Apps	Goals	Apps	Goals	Apps	Goals	Apps	Goals
Dartford	2012–13	Conference Premier	1	0	0	0	—		0	0	1	0
Dartford	2013–14	Conference Premier	1	0	0	0	—		2	2	3	2
Dartford	2014–15	Conference Premier	0	0	0	0	—		0	0	0	0
Dartford	Total		2	0	0	0	—		2	2	4	2
VCD Athletic (loan)	2014–15	Isthmian Premier	2	1	0	0	—		0	0	2	1
Corinthian (loan)	2014–15	Southern Counties East FL	18	16	0	0	—		0	0	18	16
Greenwich Borough	2015–16	Southern Counties East FL	36	32	3	3	—		5	0	44	35
Greenwich Borough	2016–17	Isthmian Division One South	45	20	0	0	—		0	0	45	20
Greenwich Borough	Total		81	52	3	3	—		5	0	89	55
Cheltenham Town	2017–18	League Two	45	23	1	0	2	2	2	0	50	25
Bristol City	2018–19	Championship	5	0	0	0	1	0	0	0	6	0
Peterborough United	2019–20	League One	29	14	4	2	1	0	1	0	35	16
Peterborough United	2020–21	League One	27	2	2	0	1	0	6	3	36	5
Peterborough United	Total		56	16	6	2	2	0	7	3	71	21
Milton Keynes Dons	2021–22	League One	35	12	1	0	1	0	4	0	41	12
Milton Keynes Dons	2022–23	League One	32	11	2	2	2	0	1	1	37	14
Milton Keynes Dons	2023–24	League Two	20	5	1	0	1	0	1	0	23	5
Milton Keynes Dons	Total		87	28	4	2	4	0	6	1	101	31
Exeter City (loan)	2023–24	League One	11	1	0	0	0	0	0	0	11	1
Nassaji Mazandaran	2024–25	Persian Gulf Pro League	10	0	0	0	—		—		10	0
Uthai Thani	2025–26	Thai League 1	30	10	1	0	1	0	—		32	10
Career total			347	147	15	7	10	2	22	6	394	162

=== International ===
As of 25 September 2026

Appearances and goals by national team and year
National team	Year	Apps	Goals
Sudan	2023	2	1
Sudan	2024	7	0
Sudan	2025	7	1
Sudan	2026	2	1
Total		18	3

== Honours ==
Individual

- EFL League Two Player of the Month: March 2018
- Cheltenham Town Player of the Year: 2017–18.
- Cheltenham Town Players' Player of the Year: 2017–18.
