= Niall Mason =

English footballer

Personal information
- Full name: Niall Aadya Mason
- Date of birth: 10 January 1997 (age 29)
- Place of birth: Brighton, England
- Height: 5 ft 11 in (1.80 m)
- Position: Center-back

Team information
- Current team: Qatar SC
- Number: 24

Youth career
- 2004–2007: Real Madrid
- 2010: Al Sadd
- 2010–2012: Blackburn Rovers
- 2012–2015: Southampton
- 2015–2016: Aston Villa

Senior career*
Years	Team	Apps	(Gls)
2015–2017	Aston Villa	0	(0)
2016–2017	→ Doncaster Rovers (loan)	38	(0)
2017–2019	Doncaster Rovers	60	(3)
2019–2021	Peterborough United	57	(1)
2021–2022	Lusail		
2022–2024	Al Shahaniya	36	(2)
2024–2025	Muaither	12	(0)
2025–	Qatar SC	17	(3)

International career^{‡}
2026–	Qatar	1	(0)
- * Club domestic league appearances and goals as of 8 November 2026 ‡ National team caps and goals as of 13 November 2026

Niall Aadya Mason (born 10 January 1997) is a professional footballer who plays as a center-back for Qatar SC. Born in England, he plays for the Qatar national team.

He was born in Brighton, and played youth football for Real Madrid, Al Sadd, Blackburn Rovers and Southampton before he signed his first professional deal at Villa. He went on to play for Doncaster Rovers and Peterborough United.

== Early life ==
Niall Mason was born in Brighton in 1997 to an American father and an Indian mother. The family spent time living in Spain and Qatar. Mason was eligible to play for India, the United States or England. He has said that he would like to play for England if the opportunity arose.

As a 7-year-old, Mason was signed by the Real Madrid academy. When David Beckham visited the academy the two would often converse, as they were the only English players at the club. He also played alongside Zinedine Zidane's sons, Enzo and Luca. He went on to play for the Al Sadd academy in Qatar when his parents moved there for work and then signed for Blackburn Rovers at the age of 13.

In his early days Mason played in advanced positions, but he has gradually moved further down the pitch and now plays mostly as a defender or defensive midfielder.

== Club career ==
=== Aston Villa ===
Mason signed his first contract with Aston Villa in 2015, after turning down a professional contract in order to join Aston Villa. Following a successful trial, he became a regular for Villa's under 21s.

He joined the first team for a summer 2015 training camp in Faro, Portugal under manager Tim Sherwood.

=== Doncaster Rovers ===
On 6 August 2016, Mason joined Doncaster Rovers on loan until January alongside Chelsea's Jordan Houghton. Both players made their debut on the same day, in a 3–2 loss to Accrington Stanley. On 1 January 2017, Mason had his loan extended until the end of the season.

On 8 May 2017, Doncaster Rovers signed Mason permanently from Aston Villa for an undisclosed fee. He scored his first goal on 23 December that year, a penalty that was the only goal of a victory away to Bristol Rovers. Three days later, he scored in the same way in a 3–0 win over Northampton Town at the Keepmoat Stadium.

Mason was a regular under Darren Ferguson and then Grant McCann, but was suspended in January 2019 following his conviction. In March 2019, Mason was sacked from Doncaster Rovers as a result of his conviction for sexual assault.

=== Peterborough United ===
In June 2019 he signed for Peterborough United. He scored his first goal for the club in an EFL Trophy tie against Burton Albion on 8 September 2020.

On 11 May 2021, it was announced that he would leave Peterborough at the end of his contract. He scored his first and only league goal for The Posh in his final appearance for the club against his former side Doncaster a few days beforehand.

In August 2021, Mason had a brief trial at Dundee. His presence led to fan protests over his conviction.

=== Al Shahiniya ===
In December 2021, Mason returned to Qatar and after a spell playing for Lusail, he joined Qatari side Al Shahaniya. In the summer of 2023 he signed a new extension on his deal for a reported $1.25 million a year salary. In July 2024, Mason joined Muaither after the federation declined him to continue at Al Shahiniya.

== International career ==
In March 2026, Mason earned his first call-up to the Qatar national team. In June 2026, he was named in Qatar's preliminary squad for the 2026 FIFA World Cup, but was not included in the final call-up list.

On 13 November 2026, Mason made his debut for Qatar in a friendly match against Australia.

== Personal life ==
=== Sexual assault conviction ===
Niall Mason was convicted of a sexual offence in January 2019, after pleading guilty to a charge in February 2018. He had sexually assaulted a woman in a bar in Doncaster. Prior to his appearance in court, Mason had maintained his innocence and continued his playing career. He was sentenced to six months in prison, suspended for two years and was placed onto a sex offenders register for seven years. Following the sentencing Mason claimed to have been advised to plead guilty by his legal team to reduce his punishment, but continued to assert his innocence.

== Career statistics ==
As of match played 5 April 2021

Appearances and goals by club, season and competition
Club	Season	League			National cup		League cup		Other		Total	
Club	Season	Division	Apps	Goals	Apps	Goals	Apps	Goals	Apps	Goals	Apps	Goals
Doncaster Rovers (loan)	2016–17	League Two	38	0	0	0	1	0	3 (Note: Appearance(s) in the Football League Trophy)	0	42	0
Doncaster Rovers	2017–18	League One	40	3	3	0	3	0	4	0	50	3
Doncaster Rovers	2018–19	League One	20	0	4	0	2	0	2	0	28	0
Doncaster Rovers	Total		60	3	7	0	5	0	6	0	78	3
Peterborough United	2019–20	League One	30	0	4	0	1	0	2	0	37	0
Peterborough United	2020–21	League One	27	1	2	0	0	0	5	1	31	1
Peterborough United	Total		57	1	6	0	1	0	7	1	68	1
Career total			155	4	13	0	7	0	16	1	188	5
