= Dan Butler (footballer, born 1994) =

English footballer (born 1994)

Personal information
- Full name: Daniel Butler
- Date of birth: 26 August 1994 (age 32)
- Place of birth: Cowes, England
- Height: 1.75 m (5 ft 9 in)
- Position: Left-back

Team information
- Current team: Stevenage
- Number: 3

Youth career
- 2004–2012: Portsmouth

Senior career*
Years	Team	Apps	(Gls)
2012–2015	Portsmouth	48	(0)
2012–2013	→ Havant & Waterlooville (loan)	8	(0)
2013–2014	→ Aldershot Town (loan)	13	(0)
2015–2016	Torquay United	45	(2)
2016–2019	Newport County	129	(7)
2019–2023	Peterborough United	110	(3)
2023–	Stevenage	91	(1)
2026-	→ Swindon Town (loan)	0	(0)
- * Club domestic league appearances and goals as of 23:18, 14 July 2026 (UTC)

Daniel Butler (born 26 August 1994) is an English professional footballer who plays as a left-back for EFL League One club Stevenage Currently on loan at Swindon Town.

== Career ==
=== Portsmouth ===
==== Early career ====
Butler joined Portsmouth's youth categories in 2004, aged 10, and signed a two-year scholarship with Pompey on 15 July 2010. On 26 June 2012, he signed a one-year professional deal.

On 14 August 2012, he made his debut in the League Cup in a 3–0 defeat at Plymouth Argyle.

==== Loan to Havant & Waterlooville ====
On 2 November 2012, Butler joined Havant & Waterlooville on a one-month youth loan deal from Portsmouth. He was assigned the number 3 shirt. In the following day, he made his debut for the Hawks in a 1–0 loss to Welling in a Conference South match. He was named the Hawks' player of the month for November. In the following month, he was named again as player of the month. He went on to make eight appearances during his time at Hawks.

==== Breakthrough ====
Butler was recalled on 8 January 2013, and was included on first-team squad due to player shortage. On 26 January 2013 he made his senior league debut in a League One match at Fratton Park, against Hartlepool United, starting the match.

Butler finished the season with 17 league appearances, 15 as a starter. On 14 May 2013, he signed a new two-year contract with Pompey, running until June 2015. After struggling to find his old form, Butler signed with Aldershot Town on loan on 31 October. He returned to Portsmouth in December, after suffering a knee injury while on loan at Aldershot.

On 11 March of the following year, after being fully recovered from injury, Butler rejoined Aldershot. He was a first-choice for Pompey in the 2014–15 season, but was still released on 18 May 2015.

=== Torquay United ===
In July 2015, Butler joined Torquay United.

=== Newport County ===
On 28 June 2016, Butler joined League Two club Newport County on a two-year contract. He made his debut for Newport on 6 August 2016 against Mansfield Town. He scored his first goal for Newport on 7 January 2017 in the League Two match against Stevenage which Newport lost 3–1. In April 2018, Butler signed a new one-year contract to remain at Newport County.

Butler was part of the Newport squad that completed the 'Great Escape' with a 2–1 victory at home to Notts County on the final dat of the 2016–17 season, which ensured Newport's survival in League Two. In May 2017, Butler was selected as Newport County Player of the Year and for the second successive season in May 2018. He was part of the team that reached the League Two playoff final at Wembley Stadium on 25 May 2019. Newport lost to Tranmere Rovers, 1-0 after a goal in the 119th minute.

During his time at the club, Butler was awarded the English Football League (EFL) player in the community two consecutive seasons, due to his outstanding work in the local community with the disabled and with young people suffering mental health issues.

=== Peterborough United ===
On 30 May 2019, it was announced that Butler had signed for EFL League One club Peterborough United on a 3-year deal and would join the club in July.

=== Stevenage ===
In July 2023 Butler joined EFL League One club Stevenage

=== Swindon Town ===
On 1 September 2026, he joined EFL League Two side Swindon Town on loan for the rest of the 2026/2027 season.

== Career statistics ==
=== Club ===
As of end of 2025–26 season

Appearances and goals by club, season and competition
Club	Season	League			FA Cup		League Cup		Other		Total	
Club	Season	Division	Apps	Goals	Apps	Goals	Apps	Goals	Apps	Goals	Apps	Goals
Portsmouth	2012–13	League One	17	0	0	0	1	0	0	0	18	0
Portsmouth	2013–14	League Two	1	0	0	0	1	0	0	0	2	0
Portsmouth	2014–15	League Two	30	0	0	0	2	0	2 (Note: Appearance(s) in Football League/EFL Trophy)	0	34	0
Portsmouth	Total		48	0	0	0	4	0	2	0	54	0
Havant & Waterlooville (loan)	2012–13	Conference South	8	0	0	0	—		3 (Note: Appearances in FA Trophy)	0	11	0
Aldershot Town (loan)	2013–14	Conference Premier	13	0	0	0	—		2	0	15	0
Torquay United	2015–16	Conference Premier	45	2	0	0	—		6	1	51	3
Newport County	2016–17	League Two	40	3	3	0	1	0	3	0	47	3
Newport County	2017–18	League Two	44	1	5	0	1	0	3	0	53	1
Newport County	2018–19	League Two	45	3	6	1	2	0	7 (Note: Four appearances in EFL Trophy, three appearances in League Two play-offs)	0	60	4
Newport County	Total		129	7	14	1	4	0	13	0	160	8
Peterborough United	2019–20	League One	29	2	4	0	0	0	3	0	36	2
Peterborough United	2020–21	League One	42	1	1	0	1	0	1	0	45	1
Peterborough United	2021–22	Championship	22	0	0	0	0	0	—		22	0
Peterborough United	2022–23	League One	27	0	3	0	0	0	2 (Note: One appearance in EFL Trophy, one appearance in League One play-offs)	0	32	0
Peterborough United	Total		120	3	8	0	1	0	6	0	135	3
Stevenage	2023–24	League One	43	1	3	0	2	0	0	0	48	1
Stevenage	2024–25	League One	32	0	2	0	1	0	3	0	38	0
Stevenage	2025–26	League One	16	0	1	0	1	0	4 (Note: Three appearances in EFL Trophy, one appearance in League One play-offs)	0	22	0
Stevenage	2026–27	League One	0	0	0	0	0	0	0	0	0	0
Stevenage	Total		91	1	6	0	4	0	7	0	108	1
Career total			454	13	28	1	13	0	39	1	534	15

== Honours ==
Individual

- Newport County Player of the Year: 2016–17, 2017–18
