= Bobby Copping =

English footballer

Personal information
- Full name: Bobby Joel Copping
- Date of birth: 27 September 2001 (age 25)
- Place of birth: Essex, England
- Height: 1.90 m (6 ft 3 in)
- Position: Centre back

Youth career
- 2008–2017: Norwich City
- 2017–2019: Bury
- 2019–2021: Peterborough United

Senior career*
Years	Team	Apps	(Gls)
2019–2021	Peterborough United	0	(0)
- * Club domestic league appearances and goals

Bobby Joel Copping (born 27 September 2001) is an English former footballer who played as a defender.

== Career ==
Copping began his career in the Norwich City academy, after being scouted playing for Dereham Wanderers. He spent nine years at Norwich, before joining Bury's academy. Copping made a first-team appearance in the Senior Lancashire Cup Final against Fleetwood Town at the age of 16. He left Bury after they were expelled from the Football League in August 2019. He went on trial with Brighton and Hove Albion, and had an offer from Sunderland, but ultimately chose to sign for Peterborough United, making his debut against Cambridge United in the EFL Trophy in November 2019. Copping appeared on the bench in Peterborough's League One tie against Bristol Rovers in December 2019.

In July 2020, following a header in a training game, Copping spent four days in hospital after suffering a mini-seizure, losing his sight and going numb down one side of his body. After a recurrence of this in his return game he announced his retirement, aged 19, in February 2021.

== Post-playing career ==
Copping joined Lincoln City as the club's new head of commercial in July 2025. A year later he was promoted to chief commercial officer at Lincoln City.

== Career statistics ==
Club	Season	League			FA Cup		EFL Cup		Other		Total	
Club	Season	Division	Apps	Goals	Apps	Goals	Apps	Goals	Apps	Goals	Apps	Goals
Peterborough United	2019–20	League One	0	0	0	0	0	0	1 (Note: Appearance in EFL Trophy)	0	1	0
Career total			0	0	0	0	0	0	1	0	1	0
