= 2024 EFL Trophy final =

- Event: 2023–24 EFL Trophy
Peterborough United	Wycombe Wanderers
2	1
- Date: 7 April 2024
- Venue: Wembley Stadium, London
- Referee: Scott Oldham
- Attendance: 42,252

The 2024 EFL Trophy final, known as the Bristol Street Motors Trophy final for sponsorship reasons, was an association football match that was played on 7 April 2024 at Wembley Stadium, London, England. It was played between League One teams Peterborough United and Wycombe Wanderers. The match decided the winners of the 2023–24 EFL Trophy, a knock-out tournament comprising clubs from League One and League Two of the English Football League (EFL), as well as 16 Category One academy sides representing Premier League and Championship clubs. It was Wycombe's first appearance in the final and the second for Peterborough who previously won the competition in 2014.

The game was played in front of an attendance of 42,252 and the referee was Scott Oldham. Although Wycombe started the game brightly, Peterborough grew into the match towards the end of the first half. Neither side could find a goal in the first 85 minutes of the match in what was described as a cagey match by the BBC. Peterborough struck first thanks to a powerful goal from captain Harrison Burrows. In the 89th minute, Wycombe responded with an equaliser from substitute Dale Taylor, whose volley from 20 yards beat the Peterborough goalkeeper. In stoppage time, Burrows scored a second goal to win the match 2–1. His deep cross from near the touchline curled beyond the Wycombe goalkeeper to seal a second triumph for Peterborough in the competition.

== Background ==
The EFL Trophy was inaugurated as the Associate Members' Cup in the 1983–84 season and followed on from the short-lived Football League Group Cup. The competition was renamed to the Football League Trophy in 1992, and to the EFL Trophy in 2016, coinciding with the Football League rebranding to the English Football League (EFL). It is open to all 48 clubs in EFL League One and EFL League Two, the third and fourth tiers of the English football league system and, starting with the 2016–17 season, 16 Category One academy teams, representing clubs from the Premier League and EFL Championship. The tournament originally used a straight knockout format, but was modified in 2016–17 to incorporate an initial group stage, in which a team is awarded three points for a win and zero for a defeat. In the event of a draw, a penalty shoot-out is held at the end of the game with the winner of the shoot-out receiving two points and the loser one. In the 2023–24 season it was referred to by its sponsorship name, the Bristol Street Motors Trophy. The sponsorship name of the EFL Trophy was changed midway through the competition in November 2023, previously being sponsored by Papa John's.

Both Peterborough United and Wycombe Wanderers appeared in the competition due to their membership of League One for the 2023–24 season. Peterborough had previously competed in the final, having won the competition in the 2013–14 season, defeating Chesterfield in the 2014 final. Manager Darren Ferguson led Peterborough to that victory and entered the 2024 final during his fourth spell at the club. As well as the 2014 final, Peterborough had played at Wembley Stadium on two other occasions for Football League play-off finals in 1992 and 2000. In contrast, it was the first time that Wycombe had reached the final of the EFL Trophy and contested for the club's first professional trophy. Their previous best performance in the competition was in the semi-finals of the 2016–17 season. Despite this, Wycombe had previously played at Wembley on six occasions, winning four times in other tournaments. Wycombe's manager Matt Bloomfield had previously played at Wembley as captain for the club in the 2020 EFL League One play-off final.

The two clubs had met twice already during the league that season. At the London Road Stadium, both played out a 2–2 draw in October 2023. The return fixture was played at Wycombe's Adams Park in February 2024 with the home side recording an emphatic 5–2 victory over Peterborough. Wycombe had therefore won three of the four previous league encounters between the two teams. The BBC noted that matches between the two sides are often high scoring matches with 112 goals in their previous 30 Football League meetings. The two sides had only met once previously in the competition, during the 2022–23 edition of the EFL Trophy with Wycombe winning the group stage affair following a penalty shoot-out. Ahead of the match, Sam Avery, BBC Three Counties Radio's Wycombe commentator described the 2023–24 season as a transitional one for Wycombe owing to it being Matt Bloomfield's first full year in charge.

== Route to the final ==
Note: In all results below, the score of the finalist is given first (H: home; A: away).

Peterborough United		Round	Wycombe Wanderers	
Opponent	Result	Group stage	Opponent	Result
Cambridge United	2–0 (H)	Matchday 1	Crystal Palace U21	1–0 (H)
Tottenham Hotspur U21	3–1 (H)	Matchday 2	Stevenage	1–0 (A)
Colchester United	0–1 (A)	Matchday 3	AFC Wimbledon	1–0 (H)
Southern section Group D: Pos / Team / Pld / Pts; 1 / Peterborough United / 3 / 6; 2 / Colchester United / 3 / 6; 3 / Tottenham Hotspur U21 / 3 / 3; 4 / Cambridge United / 3 / 3; Updated to match(es) played on 7 November 2023. Source: EFL.com		Final standings	Southern section Group C: Pos / Team / Pld / Pts; 1 / Wycombe Wanderers / 3 / 9; 2 / AFC Wimbledon / 3 / 5; 3 / Stevenage / 3 / 4; 4 / Crystal Palace U21 / 3 / 0; Updated to match(es) played on 14 November 2023. Source: EFL.com	
Opponent	Result	Knockout stage	Opponent	Result
Arsenal U21	3–0 (H)	Round of 32	Fulham U21	3–2 (H)
Crawley Town	2–1 (H)	Round of 16	West Ham United U21	2–1 (H)
AFC Wimbledon	3–1 (H)	Quarter-final	Brighton & Hove Albion U21	4–1 (H)
Blackpool	3–0 (A)	Semi-final	Bradford City	1–0 (A)

=== Peterborough United ===
Peterborough's 2023–24 EFL Trophy campaign commenced in the group stage, competing in Group D of the Southern section along with Cambridge United, Colchester United, and a team from the Tottenham Hotspur Under-21s. In Peterborough's first match, played on 12 September 2023, was the Cambridgeshire derby as they hosted their rivals Cambridge United at London Road. Two goals from either side of half time sealed a 2–0 win for the Posh in their opening match of the competition. Peterborough controlled much of the possession throughout the match and opened the scoring through Jadel Katongo. A miss-hit effort from Ryan de Havilland from range fell into the path of Katongo who was able to swivel and shoot past the Cambridge goalkeeper to open the scoring in the 19th minute. In the 54th minute, a through ball from Jonson Clarke-Harris found Ephron Mason-Clark who fed the ball past the keeper to seal the match for the home side. On 31 October, their second match took place against Tottenham Hotspur Under-21s at home. The academy side took the lead with a goal from Alejo Véliz. However, Emmanuel Fernandez equalised for the home side to go in level at half time. Two goals in the second half from Ricky-Jade Jones and Kwame Poku confirmed the three points for Peterborough. In the final match of the group, they succumbed to a 1–0 defeat away to League Two club Colchester United with a goal from Bradley Ihionvien. Despite this defeat, Peterborough still finished top of Group D to progress to the next round of the competition.

In the round of 32 stage, Peterborough faced Arsenal Under-21s at home. Posh took the lead after a de Havilland strike which found the bottom corner. They doubled their lead before half time after Arsenal lost possession near their own box with the ball being squared to Clark-Harris to score. Peterborough scored their third of the match after a counterattack which culminated in Malik Mothersille slotting the ball past the goalkeeper. In the round of 16, the Posh were drawn at home again this time to League Two side Crawley Town. A Nick Tsaroulla goal for Crawley opened the scoring, but a deflected strike from Harrison Burrows levelled the match five minutes later. Mason-Clark intercepted a poor pass to score in the 37th minute which would ultimately be the winner. Peterborough would play at home in the quarter-finals against League Two side AFC Wimbledon. A 3–1 win for the Posh sealed their first appearance in the semi-finals of the competition since their 2014 campaign. Peterborough were 2–0 up after only four minutes thanks to goals from Mothersille and Mason-Clark. A late goal for Ryan McLean for Wimbledon brought his team back into the match before Ricky Jade-Jones sealed Peterborough's progression in stoppage time with a third goal. In the semi-final, Peterborough confirmed their place at the Wembley final with an emphatic 3–0 victory against league rivals Blackpool at Bloomfield Road. Mothersille opened the scoring with an effort that found the top corner which was his third goal in his last four EFL Trophy matches. Peterborough scored their second goal in the 80th minute with Harrison Burrows converting a penalty. This dominant performance was rewarded with a third goal from Burrows once again. His curling shot found the far corner in stoppage time.

=== Wycombe Wanderers ===
Wycombe were placed in Southern Group C for the group stage, alongside AFC Wimbledon, Stevenage and Crystal Palace Under-21s. Their opening match of the campaign came on 19 September against Crystal Palace Under-21s at home. In front of 442 supporters, Wycombe's win came courtesy of a stoppage time winning penalty from Luke Leahy. Their second match was an away tie against League One side Stevenage. A 70th-minute winner from striker Sam Vokes sealed a narrow victory for the Chairboys and also confirmed their advancement to the knockout stages. Their final match of the group stage was rescheduled and brought forward by three days to ease fixture congestion for the two sides. Wycombe would win 1–0 for the third match in a row courtesy of an 84th minute Kieran Sadlier strike.

In the round of 32, Wycombe conceded in the tournament for the first time but still prevailed 3–2 against Fulham Under-21s. Nottingham Forest loanee Dale Taylor scored a first half brace for Wycombe before Ollie O'Neill halved the deficit for Fulham in stoppage time of the first half. A 79th-minute goal from Chris Forino-Joseph put Wycombe into a 3–1 lead which was pegged back by Jonathan Esenga three minutes later, although Wycombe held on to progress. In the round of 16 against West Ham United Under-21s, an own goal from Lewis Orford gave Wycombe an early lead into the match which Richard Kone doubled to give his side a 2–0 lead at half time. A second half goal from West Ham was ultimately a consolation as Wycombe progressed to the next round. The Chairboys were drawn to an academy side for a third time in a row, against Brighton & Hove Albion Under-21s at home in the quarter-finals. Three goals for Wycombe gave them the lead ahead of half time thanks to two goals from Kieran Sadlier and an own goal from Leigh Kavanagh. Dale Taylor added a fourth for Wycombe just after half time and they held on for a 4–1 win after Brighton had gone down to ten men. In the semi-final, the Chairboys sealed their first appearance in an EFL Trophy final with a late 1–0 away win at League Two club Bradford City. The home side dominated much of the game with Wycombe failing to manage a shot on target until the 80th minute. A cross from the right-wing found Matt Butcher who scored from a half-volley into the bottom right corner. The goal from Butcher was his first for Wycombe Wanderers.

== Pre-match ==
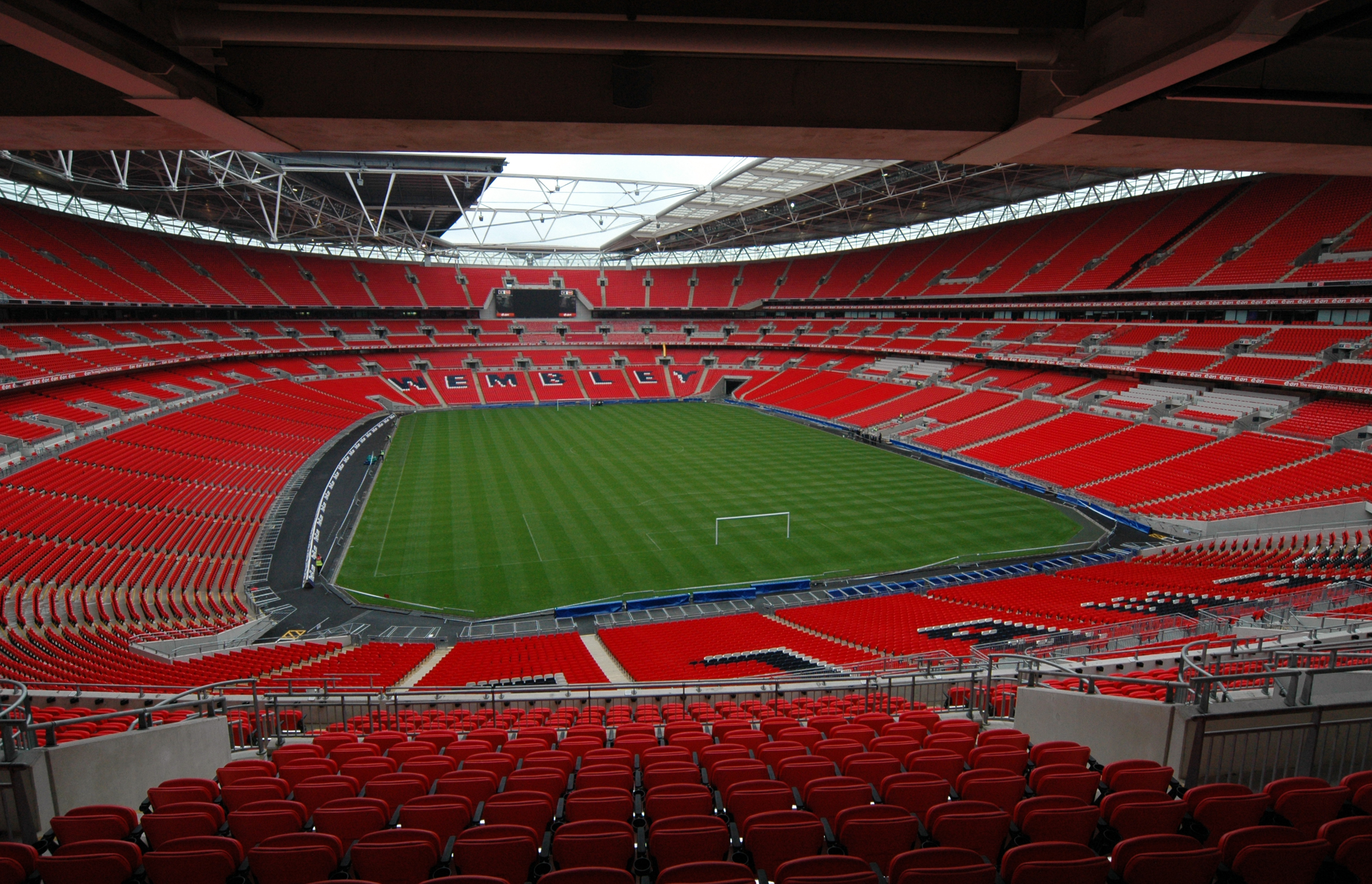
Wembley Stadium, the venue for the 2024 EFL Trophy final

Ahead of the match, Peterborough were in play-off contention, sitting in fourth place in League One, eight points below the automatic promotion places with two games in hand on the teams above them. Their manager Darren Ferguson said "The group of players I've got, I really think they'll thrive on the occasion (at Wembley). I think they'll go there and really enjoy it and hopefully get a performance that's good enough to beat Wycombe." Peterborough's captain Harrison Burrows was a supporter of the club growing up, and attended the 2014 final. Speaking to the BBC before the match, Burrows said "I don't want to overthink Wembley. When I get there I know it will hit me...Everyone you speak to says it's such a special feeling to play there."

Pre-match, Wycombe were mid-table and were sat in 14th position in League One before kick off. Wycombe's manager Matt Bloomfield said "he couldn't be more proud", adding that "It feels exciting... When moments like this come around you need to make sure you embrace it." Furthermore, Bloomfield said "I'm a football romantic. To go back there as a captain and a manager is amazing... a wonderfully proud day for my family and everyone being there watching... Ultimately you have to put that to one side because you're judged on winning and losing at Wembley."

Peterborough Cathedral was lit up in blue before the match in support of the Posh. Peterborough United supporters raised over £5,000 to fund supporters who may struggle to attend the match due to financial concerns. Both clubs were allocated 25,000 tickets each.

A coin toss decided that Peterborough had first choice on the kit. This meant that Wycombe had to wear their green and white away kit, which celebrates Wycombe's 30th Anniversary of their first season in the EFL, but with dedicated green socks instead of white socks as to not clash with Peterborough's socks. Scott Oldham was confirmed as the referee for the final, assisted by Richard Woodward and Justin Amey, with Tom Kirk as the fourth official. Peterborough had won the last five matches that had been refereed by Oldham. The national anthem before the game was sung by Harry Linacre. Posh made one change to their starting lineup with Joel Randall replacing David Ajiboye whereas Wycombe made five changes to their starting eleven. Jack Grimmer, Nigel Lonwijk, Richard Kone, Kieran Sadlier and Freddie Potts coming in for the Chairboys.

== Match ==
=== First half ===
The match began at 16:30 BST at Wembley Stadium in front of 42,252 supporters. For the opening stages of the match Wycombe started the game brightly with most of the ball being played in Peterborough's half. The opening chance fell to Garath McCleary who volleyed over the bar in the 25th minute of the match. McCleary was involved again, forcing a save from Peterborough's goalkeeper Jed Steer. Posh began to grow into the match towards the end of the first half. After a header from Josh Knight had missed the target, referee Scott Oldham declined a penalty appeal from Peterborough after the ball hit Luke Leahy as he went to ground. A pass from Kwame Poku in stoppage time found Joel Randall who forced a good save from Franco Ravizzoli in the Wycombe net.

=== Second half ===
At the beginning of the second half, Posh continued to control possession. Josh Knight had another chance, however it was blocked by Chris Forino-Joseph from close range to deny him the opener. Both teams struggled to create clear cut chances throughout the second half in what was described by Chris Harby of the BBC as a "largely cagey final". Wycombe had a goal ruled out due to a foul on Jed Steer. A loose pass from Steer fell to Kieran Sadlier, however he could not hit the target. Poku and Ricky-Jade Jones created chances for Posh as the match looked likely to continue into extra time. Nevertheless, Peterborough's captain Harrison Burrows exchanged passes with Ephron Mason-Clark before hitting a powerful shot past Ravizzoli in the Wycombe goal to open the scoring in the 85th minute. Wycombe responded well to going behind. Substitute Dale Taylor hit a left-foot volley from 20 yards which beat Steer to equalise the match in the 89th minute. However, in stoppage time Burrows scored the winner and his second of the match after a deep cross near the right-hand touchside managed to curl beyond Ravizzoli in the Wycombe net to seal Peterborough's victory.

=== Details ===
7 April 2024
16:30 BST

Peterborough United	2–1	Wycombe Wanderers
Burrows 85', 90+1'	Report	Taylor 89'

Wembley Stadium, London
Attendance: 42,252
Referee: Scott Oldham

Peterborough United	Wycombe Wanderers

GK	21	(England) Jed Steer
RB	2	(England) Jadel Katongo
CB	5	(England) Josh Knight
CB	4	(England) Ronnie Edwards
LB	3	(England) Harrison Burrows	(yellow card) 90+8'
CM	22	(Cyprus) Hector Kyprianou
CM	27	(England) Archie Collins	(yellow card) 81'
RW	11	(Ghana) Kwame Poku		(substituted off) 90+6'
AM	14	(England) Joel Randall		(substituted off) 90+3'
LW	10	(England) Ephron Mason-Clark
CF	17	(England) Ricky-Jade Jones		(substituted off) 80'
Substitutions:
GK	1	(Australia) Nicholas Bilokapic
DF	6	(England) Romoney Crichlow		(substituted on) 90+6'
DF	36	(England) James Dornelly
MF	8	(England) Ryan de Havilland
MF	16	(England) David Ajiboye
FW	9	(Jamaica) Jonson Clarke-Harris		(substituted on) 90+3'
FW	18	(England) Malik Mothersille		(substituted on) 80'
Manager:
(Scotland) Darren Ferguson

GK	25	(Argentina) Franco Ravizzoli
RB	2	(Scotland) Jack Grimmer
CB	5	(Saint Lucia) Chris Forino	(yellow card) 90+8'
CB	22	(Netherlands) Nigel Lonwijk
LB	10	(England) Luke Leahy
DM	19	(England) Freddie Potts
RM	12	(Jamaica) Garath McCleary
CM	4	(England) Josh Scowen		(substituted off) 87'
CM	8	(England) Matt Butcher
LM	23	(Republic of Ireland) Kieran Sadlier		(substituted off) 87'
CF	24	(Ivory Coast) Richard Kone		(substituted off) 76'
Substitutions:
GK	1	(Poland) Max Stryjek
DF	6	(England) Ryan Tafazolli
DF	17	(Wales) Joe Low
DF	26	(England) Jason McCarthy
MF	7	(England) David Wheeler		(substituted on) 76'
FW	9	(Wales) Sam Vokes		(substituted on) 87'
FW	20	(Northern Ireland) Dale Taylor		(substituted on) 87'
Manager:
(England) Matt Bloomfield

== Post-match ==
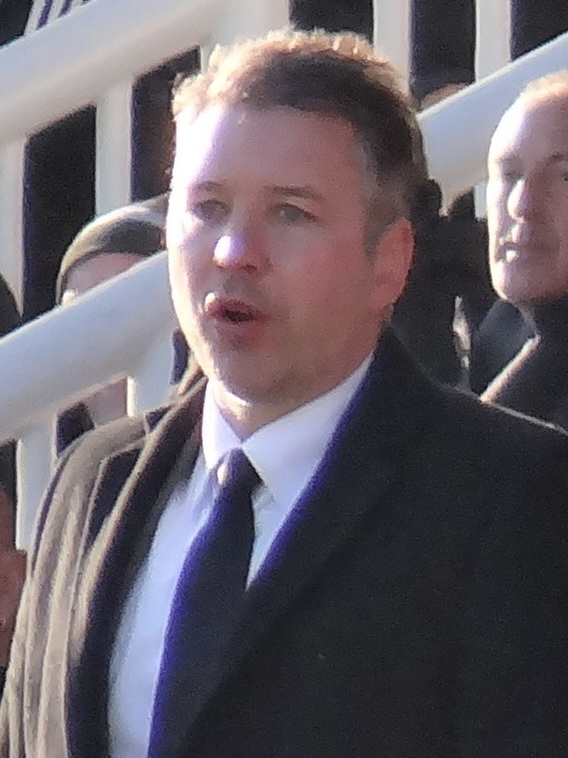
Darren Ferguson, Peterborough United's manager

The win confirmed a second title of the EFL Trophy for Peterborough after previously winning in 2014, maintaining the 100% win record at Wembley. The match was celebrated in front of 23,000 Peterborough supporters.

Speaking after the match, Peterborough's manager Darren Ferguson said: "What a day. What a feeling... For this young squad to find a way after conceding that late equaliser was a credit to them. It was mayhem so I had to calm them down a bit and say: 'Just keep the ball, don't give it away.' And we managed to get a bit of luck. Whether it's a cross or a shot it doesn't matter – what a story for that kid." Wycombe's manager Matt Bloomfield added "I'm disappointed, but proud with the way the team played," ... "I'm proud of the spectacle we put on, and disappointed for the players and spectators because I felt we deserved something out of the game. But when a goal like that goes in against you, for it to be the winner, sometimes it's not meant to be."

Wycombe finished their 2023–24 League One season in 10th position, whereas Peterborough finished their 2023–24 League One campaign in 4th position. Posh finished eight points below the automatic promotion places so would therefore compete in the EFL League One play-offs. In the play-offs, Peterborough were eliminated in the semi-finals, losing 2–1 on aggregate to Oxford United.

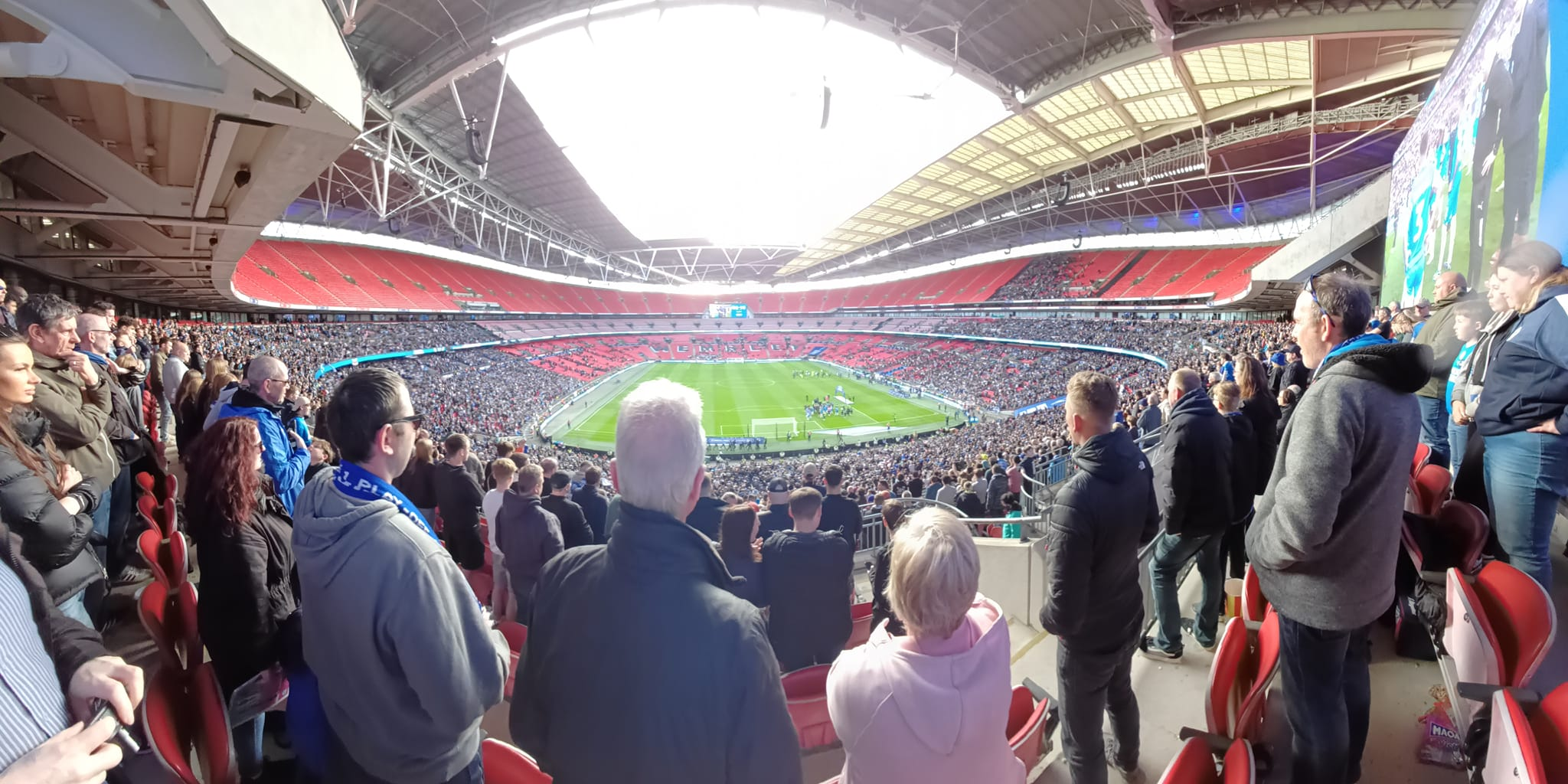
Panorama of Peterborough United Fans at Wembley in 2024, having just won the EFL Trophy against Wycombe Wanderers.

The following year, Peterborough would become the first team to retain the trophy, beating Birmingham City 2–0 in the final.
