= 2025 EFL Trophy final =

- Event: 2024–25 EFL Trophy
Birmingham City	Peterborough United
0	2
- Date: 13 April 2025
- Venue: Wembley Stadium, London
- Referee: Ben Speedie
- Attendance: 71,722

The 2025 EFL Trophy final, known as the Vertu Trophy final for sponsorship reasons, was an association football match that was played on 13 April 2025 at Wembley Stadium, London, England. It was played between League One teams and two-time winners Peterborough United, who were also the defending champions, and Birmingham City. The match decided the winners of the 2024–25 EFL Trophy, a knock-out tournament comprising clubs from League One and League Two of the English Football League (EFL), as well as 16 Category One academy sides representing Premier League and Championship clubs. Peterborough United successfully defended the title—the first team to retain the EFL Trophy, tying the record of three wins held by Bristol City by their win in the 2015 final and becoming the only team to play and win all three EFL Trophy finals in their history.

== Route to the final ==
Note: In all results below, the score of the finalist is given first (H: home; A: away).

Birmingham City		Round	Peterborough United	
Opponent	Result	Group stage	Opponent	Result
Walsall	1–1 (3–4 p) (H)	Matchday 1	Gillingham	2–1 (A)
Shrewsbury Town	4–0 (A)	Matchday 2	Stevenage	2–0 (H)
Fulham U21	7–1 (H)	Matchday 3	Crystal Palace U21	4–1 (H)
Southern section Group A: Pos / Team / Pld / Pts; 1 / Walsall / 3 / 8; 2 / Birmingham City / 3 / 7; 3 / Fulham U21 / 3 / 3; 4 / Shrewsbury Town / 3 / 0; Source: EFL		Final standings	Southern section Group D: Pos / Team / Pld / Pts; 1 / Peterborough United / 3 / 9; 2 / Stevenage / 3 / 4; 3 / Crystal Palace U21 / 3 / 3; 4 / Gillingham / 3 / 2; Source: EFL	
Opponent	Result	Knockout stage	Opponent	Result
Exeter City	2–1 (A)	Round of 32	Northampton Town	3–0 (H)
Swindon Town	2–1 (A)	Round of 16	Walsall	4–2 (H)
Stevenage	1–0 (A)	Quarter-final	Cheltenham Town	3–2 (H)
Bradford City	2–1 (H)	Semi-final	Wrexham	2–2 (4–2 p) (A)

== Match ==
=== Details ===
13 April 2025
15:00 BST

Birmingham City	0–2	Peterborough United
	Report	Mills 15'; Kyprianou 45'

Wembley Stadium, London
Attendance: 71,722
Referee: Ben Speedie

Birmingham City	Peterborough United

GK	21	(England) Ryan Allsop
RB	2	(England) Ethan Laird		(substituted off) 64'
CB	4	(Austria) Christoph Klarer
CB	25	(England) Ben Davies		(substituted off) 86'
LB	20	(England) Alex Cochrane
DM	24	(Japan) Tomoki Iwata
DM	13	(South Korea) Paik Seung-ho		(substituted off) 72'
AM	18	(Iceland) Willum Willumson		(substituted off) 46'
RW	30	(England) Kieran Dowell	(yellow card) 43'
LW	14	(England) Keshi Anderson
CF	28	(England) Jay Stansfield
Substitutions:
GK	45	(Northern Ireland) Bailey Peacock-Farrell
DF	19	(England) Taylor Gardner-Hickman		(substituted on) 64'
DF	31	(Scotland) Grant Hanley
MF	12	(Scotland) Marc Leonard		(substituted on) 72'
MF	26	(Wales) Luke Harris
FW	9	(England) Alfie May	(yellow card) 52'	(substituted on) 46'
FW	10	(England) Lukas Jutkiewicz	(yellow card) 90+11'	(substituted on) 86'
Manager:
(England) Chris Davies

GK	31	(England) Jed Steer
RB	33	(England) James Dornelly
CB	5	(Sweden) Oscar Wallin
CB	37	(England) Emmanuel Fernandez		(substituted off) 90+1'
LB	34	(England) Harley Mills
DM	22	(Cyprus) Hector Kyprianou	(yellow card) 77'
DM	4	(England) Archie Collins
AM	7	(Jamaica) Malik Mothersille		(substituted off) 75'
RW	11	(Ghana) Kwame Poku
LW	10	(England) Abraham Odoh	(yellow card) 56'
CF	17	(England) Ricky-Jade Jones		(substituted off) 86'
Substitutions:
GK	1	(Australia) Nicholas Bilokapic
DF	27	(England) Jadel Katongo	(yellow card) 90+12'	(substituted on) 90+1'
MF	8	(England) Ryan de Havilland
MF	9	(Northern Ireland) Chris Conn-Clarke
MF	20	(Spain) Mahamadou Susoho		(substituted on) 75'
FW	18	(Republic of Ireland) Cian Hayes
FW	19	(Sweden) Gustav Lindgren		(substituted on) 86'
Manager:
(Scotland) Darren Ferguson
