= 2024–25 Peterborough United F.C. season =

91st season in existence of Peterborough United FC

Peterborough United
2024–25 season
- Owner: Darragh MacAnthony (75%), Kelgary Sports & Entertainment (20%), IRC Investments Limited (5%)
- Chairman: Darragh MacAnthony
- Manager: Darren Ferguson
- Stadium: Weston Homes Stadium
- League One: 18th
- FA Cup: Third round
- EFL Cup: First round
- EFL Trophy: Winners
- Top goalscorer: League: Malik Mothersille; Kwame Poku (12 each); All: Ricky-Jade Jones (17 goals)
- Highest home attendance: 12,370 9 November 2024 vs. Cambridge United)
- Lowest home attendance: 1,630 5 November 2024 vs. Crystal Palace U21
- Average home league attendance: 9,527 (21 January 2025)
- Biggest win: 6–1 9 November 2024 vs. Cambridge United)
- Biggest defeat: 5–1 25 January 2025 vs. Lincoln City
Home colours	Away colours	Third colours
- All statistics correct as of 29 March 2025.

The 2024–25 season is the 91st season in the history of Peterborough United Football Club, and their third consecutive season in League One. In addition to the domestic league, the club would also participate in the FA Cup, the EFL Cup, and the EFL Trophy.

== Transfers ==
=== In ===
Date	Pos.	Player	From	Fee	Ref.
14 June 2024 (Note: The transfer was announced on 21 May, and would become official on June 14 once the transfer window re-opens)	LW	Abraham Odoh (ENG)	Harrogate Town (ENG)	Undisclosed	
17 June 2024	CM	Chris Conn-Clarke (NIR)	Altrincham (ENG)	Undisclosed	
18 June 2024	CB	George Nevett (WAL)	Rochdale (ENG)	Undisclosed	
1 July 2024 (Note: The transfer was announced on 10 June, and would become official on July 1 once his Welling United contract expired)	CF	David Kamara (ENG) (Note: Signed initially for the Under 21s)	Welling United (ENG)	Free	
1 July 2024 (Note: The transfer was announced on 21 June, and would become official on July 1 once his West Bromwich Albion contract expired)	CB	Jenson Sumnall (ENG)	West Bromwich Albion (ENG)	Free	
3 July 2024	LB	Rio Adebisi (ENG)	Crewe Alexandra (ENG)	Undisclosed	
3 July 2024	RW	Cian Hayes (IRL)	Fleetwood Town (ENG)	Undisclosed	
26 July 2024	LB	Jack Sparkes (ENG)	Portsmouth (ENG)	Undisclosed	
1 August 2024	CB	Oscar Wallin (SWE)	Degerfors IF (SWE)	Undisclosed	
9 August 2024	AM	Ma'kel Bogle-Campbell (ENG)	Fulham (ENG)	Free	
9 August 2024	GK	Bastian Smith (ENG)	Portsmouth (ENG)	Free	
9 August 2024	CM	Tyler Young (ENG)	Queens Park Rangers (ENG)	Free	
30 August 2024	CF	Bradley Ihionvien (ENG)	Colchester United (ENG)	Undisclosed	
29 October 2024	CB	Justin Osagie (IRE)	Celtic (SCO)	Free	
1 January 2025 (Note: The transfer was announced on September 7, and would become official on January 1 once the transfer window re-opens)	CF	Gustav Lindgren (SWE)	Degerfors IF (SWE)	Undisclosed	
4 January 2025	RB	Carl Johnston (NIR)	Fleetwood Town (ENG)	Undisclosed	
16 January 2025	LB	Tayo Edun (ENG)	Charlton Athletic (ENG)	Undisclosed	
3 February 2025	CM	Joe Andrews (WAL)	Chippenham Town (ENG)	Undisclosed	

=== Out ===
Date	Pos.	Player	To	Fee	Ref.
3 July 2024	CB	Ronnie Edwards (ENG)	Southampton (ENG)	Undisclosed	
3 July 2024	CB	Charlie O'Connell (ENG)	Boreham Wood (ENG)	Undisclosed	
4 July 2024	RW	Kai Corbett (ESP)	Aldershot Town (ENG)	Undisclosed	
27 July 2024	LB	Harrison Burrows (ENG)	Sheffield United (ENG)	Undisclosed	
9 January 2025	AM	Joel Randall (ENG)	Bolton Wanderers (ENG)	Undisclosed	
3 February 2025	CB	Romoney Crichlow (ENG)	Bradford City (ENG)	Free	

=== Loaned in ===
Date	Pos.	Player	From	Date until	Ref.
2 August 2024	RB	Sam Curtis (IRL)	Sheffield United (ENG)	2 January 2025 (Note: On 2 January, Curtis was recalled to Sheffield United)	
6 August 2024	DM	Mahamadou Susoho (ESP)	Manchester City (ENG)	End of Season	
30 August 2024	CB	Jadel Katongo (ENG)	Manchester City (ENG)	End of Season	
16 January 2025	CB	Sam Hughes (ENG)	Stockport County (ENG)	End of Season	

=== Loaned out ===
Date	Pos.	Player	To	Date until	Ref.
23 July 2024	CF	Pemi Aderoju (ENG)	Boston United (ENG)	31 March 2025	
26 July 2024	LB	Aaron Powell (ENG)	Kettering Town (ENG)	End of Season	
2 August 2024	CF	Jacob Wakeling (ENG)	Gillingham (ENG)	End of Season	
26 August 2024	CF	Kabongo Tshimanga (ENG)	Swindon Town (ENG)	End of Season	
6 September 2024	LB	Harley Mills (ENG)	Enfield Town (ENG)	1 November 2024 (Note: On 1 November, Mills was recalled from his loan spell at Enfield Town)	
3 October 2024	CB	Romoney Crichlow (ENG)	Dagenham & Redbridge (ENG)	1 January 2025	
7 November 2024	RW	David Ajiboye (ENG)	York City (ENG)	15 January 2025	
30 November 2024	CB	Jenson Sumnall (ENG)	Stamford (ENG)	28 December 2024	
16 January 2025	RW	David Ajiboye (ENG)	Newport County (WAL)	End of Season	
17 January 2025	CB	Ollie Rose (ENG)	Scunthorpe United (ENG)	End of Season (Note: On 20 February, Rose's loan at Scunthorpe was extended until the end of season)	
20 January 2025	LB	Jack Sparkes (ENG)	Chesterfield (ENG)	End of Season	
3 February 2025	CM	Joe Andrews (WAL)	Chippenham Town (ENG)	End of Season	

=== Released / Out of Contract ===
Date	Pos.	Player	Subsequent club	Join date	Ref.
30 June 2024	RB	János Bodnár (HUN)	Vasas SC (HUN)	1 July 2024	
30 June 2024	CF	Jonson Clarke-Harris (JAM)	Rotherham United (ENG)	1 July 2024	
30 June 2024	CB	Josh Knight (ENG)	Hannover 96 (GER)	1 July 2024	
30 June 2024	CF	Reuben Marshall (ENG)	Corby Town (ENG)	1 July 2024	
30 June 2024	CM	Roddy McGlinchey (ENG)	Rushall Olympic (ENG)	1 July 2024	
30 June 2024	RB	Ashton Fox (ENG)	Peterborough Sports (ENG)	5 July 2024	
30 June 2024	GK	Fynn Talley (ENG)	Kitchee (HKG)	5 July 2024	
30 June 2024	CM	Will Van Lier (ENG)	Peterborough Sports (ENG)	23 July 2024	
30 June 2024	RB	Vontae Daley-Campbell (ENG)	Chesterfield (ENG)	1 August 2024	
30 June 2024	CM	Hisham Chiha (TUN)	Boldmere St Michaels (ENG)	20 August 2024	
30 June 2024	CF	Lewis Darlington (ENG)	Spalding United (ENG)	16 July 2024	
30 June 2024	DM	Jeando Fuchs (CMR)	Bnei Sakhnin (ISR)	30 August 2024	
30 June 2024	CF	David Kawa (ENG)	Aveley (ENG)	24 August 2024	
30 June 2024	CM	MacKenzie Lamb (SCO)	Stratford Town (ENG)	20 August 2024	
30 June 2024	CF	Gabriel Overton (ENG)	Lowestoft Town (ENG)	10 August 2024	
30 June 2024	RB	Harry Thomas (ENG)	Poole Town (ENG)	31 July 2024	
30 June 2024	DM	Harry Titchmarsh (ENG)	Hitchin Town (ENG)	2 August 2024	

== Pre-season and friendlies ==
On 24 May, Peterborough announced their first pre-season friendly, against Spalding United along with a training camp in Spain. Four days later, a second local friendly was confirmed by the club, against Stamford. A third was later added, against Colchester United. A fourth was added, with a trip to Boston United confirmed. On 12 June, the club announced back-to-back fixtures against Notts County. Nine days later, AFC Wimbledon were confirmed as the opponents in La Nucia. A behind closed doors fixture against West Bromwich Albion was also added.

Win Draw Loss Fixtures

12 July 2024 Friendly	AFC Wimbledon	1–0	Peterborough United	La Nucia, Spain
19:00 CEST (18:00 BST)	Smith 51'	Report		Stadium: Estadi Olímpic Camilo Cano

16 July 2024 Friendly	Spalding United	0–7	Peterborough United	Spalding
19:45 BST			Wakeling 8' 16'; Fernandez (yellow card) 14'; Hayes 50' 65'; Mothersille 72'; Ajiboye 85'; Randall 90'	Stadium: Sir Halley Stewart Field; Attendance: 1,360

20 July 2024 Friendly	Peterborough United	1–2	West Bromwich Albion	Burton upon Trent
13:00 BST	Odoh		Thomas-Asante; Crichlow o.g	Stadium: St George's Park National Football Centre; Attendance: 0 (behind closed doors)

23 July 2024 Friendly	Boston United	4–6	Peterborough United	Boston
19:00 BST	Mooney 15'; Weston 23' 32'; Leak (yellow card) 45'; Green 53'	Report	Poku 6'; Jones 9'; Conn-Clarke 17' 45'; Kamara 90' 117'	Stadium: Jakemans Community Stadium; Attendance: 1,428
Note: (Game played with 60 minute halves)

26 July 2024 Friendly	Stamford	0–5	Peterborough United	Stamford
19:30 BST			Wakeling 13' 21'; Conn-Clarke 25'; Ajiboye 41'; Sumnall 45'	Stadium: Zeeco Stadium; Attendance: 1,421; Referee: Neil Hair

27 July 2024 Friendly	Peterborough United	2–1	Colchester United	Peterborough
12:30 BST	Goodliffe 25' (o.g.); Fernandez 39'		Taylor 23' (pen.)	Stadium: Idverde Training Ground; Attendance: 0 (behind closed doors)
Note: Fixture was initially scheduled to be played in Colchester, but was switched to Peterborough's training ground to protect the pitch.

3 August 2024 Friendly	Peterborough United	1–0	Notts County	Peterborough
13:30 BST	Platt 64' (o.g.)			Stadium: Weston Homes Stadium; Referee: Josh Smith

3 August 2024 Friendly	Peterborough United	4–3	Notts County	Peterborough
15:30 BST	Rose 24'; Mothersille 34' (pen.) 53'; Ajiboye 88'		McGoldrick 18' 63' (pen.); Edwards 78'	Stadium: Weston Homes Stadium; Referee: Neil Hair

== Competitions ==
=== League One ===
==== League table ====
Pos	Team	Pld	W	D	L	GF	GA	GD	Pts
16	Exeter City	46	15	11	20	49	65	−16	56
17	Mansfield Town	46	15	9	22	60	73	−13	54
18	Peterborough United	46	13	12	21	68	81	−13	51
19	Northampton Town	46	12	15	19	48	66	−18	51
20	Burton Albion	46	11	14	21	49	66	−17	47

Source: EFL Official Website
Rules for classification: 1) Points; 2) Goal difference; 3) Number of goals scored; 4) Head-to-head results; 5) Wins; 6) Away goals; 7) Penalty points (sec 9.5); 8) 12-point sending off offences

==== Results summary ====
Overall								Home						Away					
Pld	W	D	L	GF	GA	GD	Pts	W	D	L	GF	GA	GD	W	D	L	GF	GA	GD
45	13	12	20	67	79	−12	51	8	7	8	38	36	+2	5	5	12	29	43	−14

Last updated: 30 April 2025.
Source: Soccerway

==== Results by round ====
Round	1	2	3	4	6	7	5^{1}	8	9	10	11	12	13	14	15	17	18	19	20	21	22	23	24	25	27	26	28	29	30	16^{2}	32	33	34	35	36	37	38	39	40	41	31^{3}	43	44	45	42^{4}	46
Ground	H	A	A	H	H	H	A	A	A	H	H	A	H	A	H	H	H	A	H	A	H	H	A	A	H	H	A	H	A	A	A	A	H	A	H	A	H	A	A	H	H	H	A	H	A	A
Result	L	W	W	L	D	W	D	L	L	W	D	L	W	L	W	L	L	L	W	L	L	L	D	L	D	D	L	W	L	L	D	W	W	D	D	W	W	L	W	L	L	D	D	D	L	L
Position	24	11	7	11	11	10	8	12	16	14	12	15	12	13	12	12	15	15	13	16	17	18	18	19	19	19	18	19	20	20	20	20	17	17	20	18	15	15	14	15	16	17	17	17	17	18

Source: EFL
A = Away; H = Home; W = Win; D = Draw; L = Loss; P = Postponed
Notes:
- ^{1} Matchday 5 (vs. Leyton Orient) was postponed due to international call-ups
- ^{2} Matchday 16 (vs. Charlton Athletic) was postponed due to international call-ups
- ^{3} Matchday 31 (vs. Birmingham City) was postponed due to Birmingham's FA Cup involvements
- ^{4} Matchday 42 (vs. Mansfield Town was postponed due to the 2025 EFL Trophy final involvements

==== Matches ====
On 26 June, the League One fixtures were announced.

Win Draw Loss Fixtures

10 August 2024 1	Peterborough United	0–2	Huddersfield Town	Peterborough
17:30 BST	Collins (yellow card) 73'	Report	Evans 36'; Wiles 45+1'; Miller (yellow card) 71'	Stadium: London Road Stadium; Attendance: 10,627; Referee: Sunny Singh Gill

17 August 2024 2	Shrewsbury Town	1–4	Peterborough United	Shrewsbury
12:30 BST	Winchester 21'; O'Reilly (yellow card) 23'; Marquis (yellow card) 51'; Hoole (yellow card) 74'	Report	Poku 23' 58'; Randall 87' 88'	Stadium: New Meadow; Attendance: 6,015; Referee: Ben Toner
Note: Fixture was initially scheduled for a 15:00 kick-off, but was moved for live Sky Sports broadcast.

24 August 2024 3	Exeter City	1–2	Peterborough United	Exeter
15:00 BST	Cole 4'; Yfeko (yellow card) 70'	Report	Mothersille 7'; Wallin (yellow card) 23'; Fernandez 45'; Collins (penalty missed) '73 (yellow card) 90+5'; Curtis (yellow card) 90'	Stadium: St James Park; Attendance: 6,343; Referee: Will Finnie

31 August 2024 4	Peterborough United	0–2	Wrexham	Peterborough
15:00 BST		Report	Marriott 28'; Cleworth 39'	Stadium: London Road Stadium; Attendance: 12,104; Referee: Carl Brook

14 September 2024 6	Peterborough United	1–1	Lincoln City	Peterborough
15:00 BST	Collins (yellow card) 44'; Curtis (yellow card) 60'; Poku 65'; Sparkes (yellow card) 90+7'	Report	House 33'; Darikwa (yellow card) 52'	Stadium: London Road Stadium; Attendance: 9,537; Referee: Tom Reeves

21 September 2024 7	Peterborough United	3–2	Bristol Rovers	Peterborough
15:00 BST	Poku 10'; Jones 33'; Collins (yellow card) 36'; Mothersille 63'; Fernandez (yellow card) 66'		Mola (yellow card) 12'; McCormick 74'; O'Donkor 76'	Stadium: London Road Stadium; Attendance: 8,006; Referee: Farai Hallam

24 September 2024 5	Leyton Orient	2–2	Peterborough United	Leyton
19:45 BST	James 20'; Kelman 53'; Beckles (yellow card) 56'; Cooper (yellow card) 86'		Poku 42'; Mothersille 45+1' (pen.); Curtis (yellow card) 73'	Stadium: Brisbane Road; Attendance: 6,414; Referee: Daniel Middleton
Note: Fixture was originally scheduled for 7 September, but was postponed due to international call-ups.

28 September 2024 8	Birmingham City	3–2	Peterborough United	Bordesley
19:45 BST	Willumsson 24'; Dykes (yellow card) 35'; Wallin 49' (o.g.); Bielik 66'; Stansfield (yellow card) 73'; Leonard (yellow card) 90+1'	Report	Jones 4'; Fernandez 16', (yellow card) 29'; Sparkes (yellow card) 33'; Kyprianou (yellow card) 82'	Stadium: St Andrew's; Attendance: 27,206; Referee: Thomas Kirk

1 October 2024 9	Wigan Athletic	3–0	Peterborough United	Wigan
19:45 GMT	Taylor 11', 49'; Adeeko (yellow card) 56'; Thomas (yellow card) 65'; McManaman 81'; Kerr (yellow card) 90+1'	Report	Kyprianou (yellow card) 23'; Curtis (yellow card) 25'; Dornelly (yellow card) 59'; Fernandez (yellow card) 71'	Stadium: Brick Community Stadium; Attendance: 7,894; Referee: Andy Davies

5 October 2024 10	Peterborough United	2–1	Stevenage	Peterborough
12:30 BST	O'Brien-Brady 5'; Wallin (yellow card) 68'; Collins (yellow card) 78'; Poku 90+4'; Dornelly (yellow card) 90+6'		Butler (yellow card) 24'; L.Thompson (yellow card) 64'; Freestone (yellow card) 70'	Stadium: London Road Stadium; Attendance: 8,018; Referee: Alex Chilowicz
Note: Fixture was initially scheduled for a 15:00, but was moved for live Sky Sports broadcast.

12 October 2024 11	Peterborough United	3–3	Rotherham United	Peterborough
15:00 BST	Dornelly 17' (yellow card) 32'; Wallin (yellow card) 22'; Randall (yellow card) 48'; Rafferty 50' (o.g.); Fernandez 53'		Nombe 19'; Wilks 23' (yellow card) 35'; Clarke-Harris 45+1'	Stadium: London Road Stadium; Attendance: 8,859; Referee: Elliot Bell

19 October 2024 12	Wycombe Wanderers	3–1	Peterborough United	High Wycombe
12:30 BST	Kone 63', 67', 72' (pen.); Morley (yellow card) 89'	Report	O'Brien-Brady (yellow card) 32'; Fernandez (yellow card) 39' (yellow-red card) 71'; Jones 50'; Collins (yellow card) 53'; Randall (yellow card) 89'	Stadium: Adams Park; Attendance: 4,345; Referee: Lee Swabey
Note: Fixture was initially scheduled for a 15:00, but was moved for live Sky Sports broadcast.

22 October 2024 13	Peterborough United	5–1	Blackpool	Peterborough
19:45 BST	Mothersille 8', (yellow card) 51'; Randall 17', 73'; Poku 28'; Offiah 70' (o.g.)	Report	Coulson (yellow card) 24'; Joseph 27'	Stadium: London Road Stadium; Attendance: 6,391; Referee: Declan Bourne

26 October 2024 14	Bolton Wanderers	1–0	Peterborough United	Horwich
15:00 BST	Adeboyejo (yellow card) 50'; Schön (yellow card) 52'; Charles (penalty missed) 90+9'; Lolos 90+9', (yellow card) 90+10'	Report	Curtis (yellow card) 69'; Ihionvien (yellow card) 85'; Fernandez (yellow card) 88'; de Havilland (yellow card) 90+8'	Stadium: Toughsheet Community Stadium; Attendance: 20,022; Referee: Ollie Yates

9 November 2024 15	Peterborough United	6–1	Cambridge United	Peterborough
15:00 GMT	Jones 25' (yellow card) 30'; Poku 32' 39' 90'; Mothersille 44' (pen.); De Havilland 50'; Dornelly (yellow card) 61'		Kaikai 84'	Stadium: London Road Stadium; Attendance: 12,370; Referee: Ed Duckworth

23 November 2024 17	Peterborough United	1–2	Reading	Peterborough
15:00 GMT	Fernandez 90+6', (yellow card) 90+6'	Report	Knibbs 9', 23'; Bindon (yellow card) 45+2'; Mbengue (yellow card) 48'	Stadium: London Road Stadium; Attendance: 10,008; Referee: Scott Simpson

4 December 2024 18	Peterborough United	0–1	Burton Albion	Peterborough
19:45 GMT		Report	Bennett 64'	Stadium: London Road Stadium; Attendance: 6,043; Referee: Darren Drysdale
Note: Fixture was initially scheduled for 3 December, but was moved back a day due to Burton playing on the preceding Sunday.

9 December 2024 19	Northampton Town	2–1	Peterborough United	Sixfields
20:00 GMT	McGeehan 28', 84'	Report	Mothersille 39'	Stadium: Sixfields Stadium; Attendance: 7,098; Referee: Simon Mather
Note: Fixture was initially scheduled for 7 December, but was moved for live Sky Sports broadcast.

14 December 2024 20	Peterborough United	4–3	Crawley Town	Peterborough
15:00 GMT	Jones 20'; Hayes 23', 61'; Kyprianou 47'	Report	Darcy (yellow card) 11'; Mukena (yellow card) 32'; Adeyemo 38'; Swan 53'; Showunmi 55'	Stadium: London Road Stadium; Attendance: 7,874; Referee: Thomas Parsons

20 December 2024 21	Stockport County	2–1	Peterborough United	Edgeley
19:45 GMT	Bailey 11', (yellow card) 58'; Bate (yellow card) 55'; Olaofe 75'; Wootton (yellow card) 90+6'	Report	Wallin (yellow card) 17'; Randall 34'; Kyprianou (yellow card) 44'; Mothersille (yellow card) 62'; Fernandez (yellow card) 76'	Stadium: Edgeley Park; Attendance: 9,745; Referee: Lewis Smith
Note: Fixture was initially scheduled for 21 December, but was moved in order an extra days recovery for both teams during the Christmas period.

26 December 2024 22	Peterborough United	0–3	Mansfield Town	Peterborough
15:00 GMT	Wallin (yellow card) 79'; Katongo (yellow card) 81'; Nevett (red card) 86'	Report	Cargill 6'; Evans 9', 31'; Blake-Tracy (yellow card) 53'; McLaughlin (yellow card) 55'; Hewitt (yellow card) 64'; Lewis (yellow card) 66'	Stadium: London Road Stadium; Attendance: 9,985; Referee: Jacob Miles

29 December 2024 23	Peterborough United	1–3	Barnsley	Peterborough
15:00 GMT	Mothersille 74' (pen.); Mills (red card) 81'	Report	Pines (yellow card) 29', (goal) 47'; Keillor-Dunn 55'; Russell 86'; O'Keeffe (yellow card) 88'	Stadium: London Road Stadium; Referee: Alex Chilowicz

1 January 2025 24	Burton Albion	2–2	Peterborough United	Burton upon Trent
15:00 GMT	Chauke 6'; Burrell 26'; Crocombe (yellow card) 77'; Williams (yellow card) 78'; Kalinauskas (yellow card) 87'	Report	Collins 42'; Fernandez 77'; Conn-Clarke (yellow card) 80'	Stadium: Pirelli Stadium; Attendance: 2,821; Referee: Matthew Corlett

4 January 2025 25	Wrexham	1–0	Peterborough United	Wrexham
15:00 GMT	Fletcher 87', (yellow card) 88'; Dobson (yellow card) 90+1'	Report	Fernandez (yellow card) 36'; Ihionvien (yellow card) 53'	Stadium: Racecourse Ground; Attendance: 13,060; Referee: David Rock

18 January 2025 27	Peterborough United	0–0	Leyton Orient	Peterborough
12:30 GMT	Kyprianou (yellow card) 28'	Report	Obiero (yellow card) 6'; Cooper (yellow card) 87'	Stadium: London Road Stadium; Attendance: 8,235; Referee: Seb Stockbridge
Note: Fixture was initially scheduled for a 15:00 kick-off, but was moved for live Sky Sports broadcasting.

21 January 2025 26	Peterborough United	1–1	Exeter City	Peterborough
19:45 GMT	Kyprianou 34' Mothersille (yellow card) 90+5'	Report	Alli (penalty missed) 90+1 90+1'	Stadium: London Road Stadium; Attendance: 5,913; Referee: Sunny Singh Gill
Note: Fixture was initially scheduled for 11 January, but was moved due to FA Cup involvements for both teams.

25 January 2025 28	Lincoln City	5–1	Peterborough United	Lincoln
15:00 GMT	Jefferies 12'; Bayliss 33', (yellow card) 39'; Draper 55' (pen.); Hayes 66' (o.g.); O'Connor (yellow card) 73'; Collins 82'	Report	Johnston (yellow card) 37'; de Havilland (yellow card) 56'; Jones 60'; Susoho (yellow card) 62'	Stadium: Sincil Bank; Attendance: 10,014; Referee: Simon Mather

28 January 2025 29	Peterborough United	1–0	Wigan Athletic	Peterborough
19:45 GMT	Susoho 19'; Lindgren (yellow card) 43'; Johnston (yellow card) 58'; Bilokapic (yellow card) 70'	Report	Norburn (yellow card) 21'; Carragher (yellow card) 25'	Stadium: London Road Stadium; Attendance: 6,136; Referee: Carl Brook

2 February 2025 30	Bristol Rovers	3–1	Peterborough United	Horfield
15:00 GMT	Wilson 16'; Thomas (yellow card) 27'; Hutchinson 62', (yellow card) 90+4'; Sotiriou 83'	Report	Nevett (yellow card) 8'; Susoho (yellow card) 19'; Bilokapic (yellow card) 77'; Jones 90+1'	Stadium: Memorial Stadium; Attendance: 7,461; Referee: Ruebyn Ricardo
Note: Fixture was initially scheduled for 1 February, but was moved for live Sky Sports broadcasting.

11 February 2025 16	Charlton Athletic	2–1	Peterborough United	Charlton
19:45 GMT	Jones (yellow card) 2'; Godden 54' (pen.); Berry (yellow card) 60'; Ramsay (yellow card) 61'; Gillesphey 89'	Report	Edun (yellow card) 45+3'; Fernandez (red card) 58'; Mothersille 63' (pen.); Jones (yellow card) 88'	Stadium: The Valley; Attendance: 11,653; Referee: Lee Swabey
Note: Fixture was postponed due to international call-ups in the Charlton squad.

15 February 2025 32	Stevenage	1–1	Peterborough United	Stevenage
15:00 GMT	Freestone (yellow card) 49'; Kemp 55'		Kyprianou (yellow card) 33'; Hayes 67'; Edun (yellow card) 71'	Stadium: Broadhall Way; Referee: Benjamin Speedie

22 February 2025 33	Huddersfield Town	0–1	Peterborough United	Huddersfield
15:00 GMT	Hogg (yellow card) 22'		Odoh (yellow card) 20'; Kyprianou 45+4'; Dornelly (yellow card) 73'; Ihionvien (yellow card) 82'	Stadium: Kirklees Stadium; Attendance: 18,977; Referee: Darren Drysdale

1 March 2025 34	Peterborough United	3–1	Shrewsbury Town	Peterborough
15:00 GMT	Edun 9'; Mothersille 35'; Kyprianou (yellow card) 45+2'; Katongo (yellow card) 90+2'; Conn-Clarke 90+9'		Marquis (red card) 1'; Benning 14' (pen.); Hoole (yellow card) 42'	Stadium: London Road Stadium; Attendance: 11,578; Referee: Martin Woods

4 March 2025 35	Blackpool	0–0	Peterborough United	Blackpool
19:45 GMT	Silvera (yellow card) 85'		Jones (yellow card) 80'; Hughes (yellow card) 82'	Stadium: Bloomfield Road; Referee: Ross Joyce

8 March 2025 36	Peterborough United	1–1	Wycombe Wanderers	Peterborough
15:00 GMT	Mothersille 16' (pen.); Ihionvien (yellow card) 30'	Report	Kone 90+3'	Stadium: London Road Stadium; Attendance: 8,260; Referee: Scott Oldham

15 March 2025 37	Cambridge United	0–1	Peterborough United	Cambridge
12:30 GMT	Gibbons (yellow card) 35'; Watts (yellow card) 71'		Odoh (yellow card) 35'; Ihionvien (yellow card) 54'; Edun 75' (yellow card) 62' (yellow-red card) 90+5'; Hughes (yellow card) 85'	Stadium: Abbey Stadium; Attendance: 7,359; Referee: Ed Duckworth
Note: Fixture was initially scheduled for a 15:00 kick-off, but was moved following discussions with Cambridgeshire Constabulary.

22 March 2025 38	Peterborough United	3–0	Charlton Athletic	Peterborough
15:00 GMT	Hughes 38'; Odoh 43'; Mills (yellow card) 47'; Mothersille 79', (yellow card) 80'	Report	Jones (yellow card) 4'; Anderson (yellow card) 90+3'	Stadium: London Road Stadium; Attendance: 10,231; Referee: Scott Tallis

29 March 2025 39	Reading	3–1	Peterborough United	Reading
15:00 GMT	Hughes 7' (o.g.); Knibbs 58'; Savage 63'; Carroll (yellow card) 90+6'	Report	Edun (yellow card) 43'; Odoh (yellow card) 44'; Poku 66'; Hayes (yellow card) 76'	Stadium: Madejski Stadium; Attendance: 12,108; Referee: Adam Herczeg

1 April 2025 40	Crawley Town	3–4	Peterborough United	Crawley
19:45 GMT	Quitirna 12' (yellow card) 36'; Ibrahim (yellow card) 18'; Mullarkey (yellow card) 19'; Kelly 33'; Hepburn-Murphy 49'; Adeyemo (yellow card) 89'		Odoh 22' 29' 42' (yellow card) 44'; Johnston (yellow card) 44'; Collins (yellow card) 45+2'; Steer (yellow card) 69'; Jones 90+7' (pen.); Lindgren (yellow card) 90+7'	Stadium: Broadfield Stadium; Attendance: 4,111; Referee: Carl Brook

5 April 2025 41	Peterborough United	0–4	Northampton Town	Peterborough
15:00 GMT	Edun (red card) 27'	Report	Hoskins 15', 34' (pen.); McGeehan (yellow card) 27'; Costelloe 41'; Eaves 90'	Stadium: London Road Stadium; Attendance: 9,782; Referee: Simon Mather

8 April 2025 31	Peterborough United	1–2	Birmingham City	Peterborough
19:45 BST	Poku 22'	Report	May 19'; Gardner-Hickman 37'; Harris (yellow card) 54'; Iwata (yellow card) 70'	Stadium: London Road Stadium; Attendance: 10,640; Referee: Ben Toner
Note: Fixture was originally scheduled for 8 February, but was postponed due to Birmingham's FA Cup involvements.

18 April 2025 43	Peterborough United	1–1	Stockport County	Peterborough
15:00 GMT	Jones 43'; Kyprianou (yellow card) 90+2'; Wallin (yellow card) 90+3'	Report	Hills (yellow card) 25'; Touray (yellow card) 83'; Diamond (yellow card) 87', (goal) 90+1'; Moxon (yellow card) 90+5'	Stadium: London Road Stadium; Attendance: 11,241; Referee: Charles Breakspear

21 April 2025 44	Barnsley	1–1	Peterborough United	Barnsley
15:00 GMT	Connell (yellow card) 43'; Russell 45+1'; Bland (yellow card) 90+4'	Report	Jones 17'; Hughes (yellow card) 90+11'	Stadium: Oakwell; Attendance: 11,049; Referee: Andrew Humphries

26 April 2025 45	Peterborough United	1–1	Bolton Wanderers	Peterborough
15:00 GMT	Mothersille 20' (pen.), (yellow card) 20', (penalty missed) 67'; Odoh (yellow card) 24'; De Havilland (yellow card) 72'; Kyprianou (yellow card) 85'	Report	Lolos (yellow card) 16'; Matete (yellow card) 18'; Thomason (yellow card) 24'; Forino 33'; Jones (yellow card) 65'; Randall (yellow card) 68'	Stadium: London Road Stadium; Attendance: 9,231; Referee: Ruebyn Ricardo

30 April 2025 42	Mansfield Town	4–2	Peterborough United	Mansfield
19:45 BST	Maris 4'; Baccus 7'; Evans 34', 59'	Report	Nevett (yellow card) 42'; de Havilland 51'; Lindgren 87'	Stadium: Field Mill; Referee: Aaron Bannister
Note: Fixture was initially scheduled for 12 April, but was re-arranged due to the 2025 EFL Trophy final final involvements.

3 May 2025 46	Rotherham United	2–1	Peterborough United	Rotherham
15:00 GMT	Nombe 36'; Humphreys 66'; Wilks (yellow card) 67'	Report	Odoh 1', (yellow card) 28'; de Havilland (yellow card) 17'; Dornelly (yellow card) 63'; Nevett (yellow card) 76'	Stadium: New York Stadium; Attendance: 9,994; Referee: Michael Barlow

=== FA Cup ===
Peterborough United were drawn away to Newport County in the first round, at home to Notts County in the second round and away to Everton in the third round.

Win Draw Loss Fixtures

2 November 2024 First round	Newport County	2–4	Peterborough United	Newport
15:00 GMT	Glennon 5'; Whitmore 7'; Baker-Richardson (yellow card) 51'; Baker (yellow card) 56'		Odoh 27'; Randall 71'; Jones 89', 90+3'	Stadium: Rodney Parade; Attendance: 2,941; Referee: Stephen Martin

30 November 2024 Second round	Peterborough United	4–3	Notts County	Peterborough
15:00 GMT	Jones 10', 73'; Randall 77'; Odoh 87'		Scott 13'; Platt 16'; Austin (yellow card) 80'; Abbott 90+6' (yellow card) 90+8'	Stadium: London Road Stadium; Attendance: 6,310; Referee: Ruebyn Ricardo

9 January 2025 Third round	Everton	2–0	Peterborough United	Walton
19:45 GMT	Beto 42', (yellow card) 65'; Ndiaye 90+8' (pen.)	Report		Stadium: Goodison Park; Referee: Thomas Bramall

=== EFL Cup ===
On 27 June, the draw for the first round was made, with Peterborough being drawn away against Oxford United.

Win Draw Loss Fixtures

13 August 2024 First round	Oxford United	2–0	Peterborough United	Oxford
19:45 BST	Goodrham 20', (yellow card) 33'; Phillips 41'	Report	Curtis (yellow card) 65'	Stadium: Kassam Stadium; Attendance: 3,693; Referee: Geoff Eltringham

=== EFL Trophy ===
In the group stage, Peterborough were drawn into Southern Group D alongside Gillingham, Stevenage and Crystal Palace U21. In the knockout-stages, They were then drawn at home to Northampton Town in the round of 32, Walsall in the round of 16, Cheltenham Town in the quarter-finals and then away to either Wrexham or Bolton Wanderers in the semi-finals.

==== Group stage ====
Pos	Div	Team	Pld	W	PW	PL	L	GF	GA	GD	Pts	Qualification
1	L1	Peterborough United	3	3	0	0	0	8	2	+6	9	Advance to Round 2
2	L1	Stevenage	3	1	0	1	1	2	3	−1	4	Advance to Round 2
3	ACA	Crystal Palace U21	3	1	0	0	2	4	6	−2	3	
4	L2	Gillingham	3	0	1	0	2	3	6	−3	2	

Source: EFL

Win Draw Loss Fixtures

3 September 2024 Group stage	Gillingham	1–2	Peterborough United	Gillingham
19:00 BST	Dack (yellow card) 44'; Ehmer (yellow card) 73'; Nevitt 90+3'		Jones 13'; Dornelly (yellow card) 44'; Ihionvien 75'	Stadium: Priestfield Stadium; Referee: Craig Hicks

8 October 2024 Group stage	Peterborough United	2–0	Stevenage	Peterborough
19:00 BST	Mothersille 12'; O'Brien-Brady (yellow card) 25'; Nevett (yellow card) 34'; Sparkes 43'		Aboh (yellow card) 40'	Stadium: London Road Stadium; Attendance: 2,128; Referee: Stephen Parkinson

5 November 2024 Group stage	Peterborough United	4–1	Crystal Palace U21	Peterborough
19:00 GMT	O'Brien-Brady (yellow card) 34'; Odoh 49', 87'; Hayes 59'; Collins (yellow card) 65'; Mills 80'	Report	Marsh 62'	Stadium: London Road Stadium; Attendance: 1,630; Referee: Abigail Byrne

==== Knockout stages ====
17 December 2024 Round of 32	Peterborough United	3–0	Northampton Town	Peterborough
19:00 GMT	Jones 48'; De Havilland 52'; Odoh 65'		Eyoma (red card) 41'; Hoskins (yellow card) 54'	Stadium: London Road Stadium; Attendance: 2,549; Referee: James Oldham

14 January 2025 Round of 16	Peterborough United	4–2	Walsall	Peterborough
19:45 GMT	Lindgren 7' 31'; Mothersille 15' (pen.) 74'		Johnson 30'; Comley (yellow card) 82'; Gordon 90+5'	Stadium: London Road Stadium; Attendance: 2,133; Referee: Scott Simpson

5 February 2025 Quarter-finals	Peterborough United	3–2	Cheltenham Town	Peterborough
19:00 GMT	Kyprianou 24'; Odoh 52'; Jones 69'	Report	Thomas 34'; Miller 45+3'; Bradbury (yellow card) 48'; Adedokun (yellow card) 66'; Stubbs (yellow card) 71'; Jude-Boyd (yellow card) 73'	Stadium: London Road Stadium; Attendance: 2,587; Referee: Scott Oldham

26 February 2025 Semi-finals	Wrexham	2–2 (2–4 p)	Peterborough United	Wrexham
19:30 GMT	Faal 34'; Dobson 38'		Wallin (yellow card) 68'; Mothersille (penalty missed) 72', 72'; Ihionvien 90+1', (yellow card) 90+2'	Stadium: Racecourse Ground; Attendance: 9,258; Referee: Lewis Smith
	Penalties
	Mullin (penalty missed); Fletcher (penalty scored); Lee (penalty missed); Mendy (penalty scored)		(penalty scored) Ihionvien; (penalty missed) Mothersille; (penalty scored) De Havilland; (penalty scored) Mills; (penalty scored) Kyprianou

==== Final ====
13 April 2025
15:00 BST

Birmingham City	0–2	Peterborough United
	Report	Mills 15'; Kyprianou 45'

Wembley Stadium, London
Attendance: 71,722
Referee: Ben Speedie

== Statistics ==
=== Appearances and goals ===
As of match played 3 May 2025

Players with no appearances are not included on the list
Italics indicate a loaned in player

No.	Pos	Nat	Player	Total		League One		FA Cup		EFL Cup		EFL Trophy	
No.	Pos	Nat	Player	Apps	Goals	Apps	Goals	Apps	Goals	Apps	Goals	Apps	Goals
1	GK	(Australia) AUS	Nicholas Bilokapic	26	0	18+0	0	3+0	0	1+0	0	4+0	0
2	DF	(Northern Ireland) NIR	Carl Johnston	20	0	13+7	0	0+0	0	0+0	0	0+0	0
3	DF	(England) ENG	Rio Adebisi	1	0	0+1	0	0+0	0	0+0	0	0+0	0
4	MF	(England) ENG	Archie Collins	51	1	40+0	1	3+0	0	1+0	0	5+2	0
5	DF	(Sweden) SWE	Oscar Wallin	40	0	32+2	0	1+1	0	1+0	0	3+0	0
7	FW	(England) ENG	Malik Mothersille	56	16	36+9	12	2+1	0	0+1	0	5+2	4
8	MF	(England) ENG	Ryan de Havilland	36	3	15+13	2	2+1	0	0+0	0	3+2	1
9	MF	(Northern Ireland) NIR	Chris Conn-Clarke	30	1	12+11	1	1+1	0	0+1	0	4+0	0
10	FW	(England) ENG	Abraham Odoh	49	11	23+15	5	1+2	2	1+0	0	7+0	4
11	FW	(Ghana) GHA	Kwame Poku	30	12	25+2	12	2+0	0	0+0	0	0+1	0
13	GK	(England) ENG	Will Blackmore	4	0	3+0	0	0+0	0	0+0	0	1+0	0
14	DF	(England) ENG	Tayo Edun	17	2	17+0	2	0+0	0	0+0	0	0+0	0
15	DF	(Wales) WAL	George Nevett	24	0	10+6	0	2+1	0	0+0	0	4+1	0
16	FW	(England) ENG	David Ajiboye	8	0	2+4	0	0+0	0	0+1	0	0+1	0
17	FW	(England) ENG	Ricky-Jade Jones	56	17	34+12	10	3+0	4	1+0	0	2+4	3
18	FW	(Republic of Ireland) IRL	Cian Hayes	43	4	14+20	3	1+1	0	1+0	0	6+0	1
19	FW	(Sweden) SWE	Gustav Lindgren	17	3	8+6	1	0+1	0	0+0	0	2+0	2
20	MF	(Spain) ESP	Mahamadou Susoho	16	1	7+8	1	0+0	0	0+0	0	0+1	0
21	DF	(England) ENG	Jack Sparkes	28	1	18+3	0	1+1	0	1+0	0	3+1	1
22	MF	(Cyprus) CYP	Hector Kyprianou	39	4	27+7	3	1+0	0	0+0	0	3+1	1
25	DF	(England) ENG	Sam Hughes	19	1	19+0	1	0+0	0	0+0	0	0+0	0
27	DF	(England) ENG	Jadel Katongo	22	0	13+4	0	2+0	0	0+0	0	2+1	0
31	GK	(England) ENG	Jed Steer	27	0	25+0	0	0+0	0	0+0	0	2+0	0
33	DF	(England) ENG	James Dornelly	35	1	19+8	1	2+0	0	0+0	0	5+1	0
34	DF	(England) ENG	Harley Mills	16	2	8+3	0	0+0	0	0+0	0	3+2	2
35	MF	(England) ENG	Donay O'Brien-Brady	28	1	9+11	1	2+0	0	1+0	0	4+1	0
37	DF	(England) ENG	Emmanuel Fernandez	41	5	27+3	5	3+0	0	1+0	0	7+0	0
38	MF	(England) ENG	Tyler Young	1	0	0+0	0	0+0	0	0+0	0	0+1	0
40	DF	(England) ENG	Oliver Rose	4	0	0+1	0	0+0	0	0+0	0	0+3	0
41	FW	(England) ENG	David Kamara	2	0	0+0	0	0+0	0	0+0	0	0+2	0
46	FW	(England) ENG	Bolu Shofowoke	1	0	0+1	0	0+0	0	0+0	0	0+0	0
47	MF	(Wales) WAL	Joe Andrews	1	0	0+1	0	0+0	0	0+0	0	0+0	0
48	FW	(England) ENG	Bradley Ihionvien	15	2	5+6	0	0+0	0	0+0	0	0+4	2
50	FW	(England) ENG	Andre Changunda	1	0	0+1	0	0+0	0	0+0	0	0+0	0
Player(s) who featured whilst on loan but returned to parent club during the season:
2	DF	(Republic of Ireland) IRL	Sam Curtis	19	0	10+7	0	1+0	0	1+0	0	0+0	0
Player(s) who featured but departed the club permanently during the season:
6	DF	(England) ENG	Romoney Crichlow	1	0	0+0	0	0+0	0	0+1	0	0+0	0
14	MF	(England) ENG	Joel Randall	25	7	16+2	5	2+0	2	1+0	0	2+2	0
