= Bradley Ihionvien =

English footballer (born 2003)

Personal information
- Full name: Bradley Osezele Akhigbe Philip Ihionvien
- Date of birth: 23 December 2003 (age 22)
- Place of birth: Greenwich, England
- Height: 1.91 m (6 ft 3 in)
- Position: Forward

Team information
- Current team: Colchester United (on loan from Peterborough United)

Youth career
- –2021: Maidstone United
- 2021–2022: Colchester United

Senior career*
Years	Team	Apps	(Gls)
2022–2024	Colchester United	32	(4)
2022	→ Maldon & Tiptree (loan)	13	(2)
2024–	Peterborough United	16	(1)
2025–2026	→ Shrewsbury Town (loan)	12	(2)
2026–	→ Colchester United (loan)	0	(0)
- * Club domestic league appearances and goals as of 13:40, 2 June 2026 (BST)

Bradley Osezele Akhigbe Philip Ihionvien (born 23 December 2003) is an English professional footballer who plays as a forward for EFL League Two club Colchester United, on loan from EFL League One club Peterborough United.

== Career ==
=== Colchester United ===
Ihionvien came through the academy at Colchester United to make his first-team debut on 7 May 2022, when he came on as a 71st-minute substitute for John Akinde in a 2–0 victory at Hartlepool United.

Ihionvien made his full debut for Colchester on 19 August 2023 in a 3–2 home loss to MK Dons. Having established his place in the side, he made 34 appearances in all competitions during the season and scored 5 goals as Colchester narrowly avoided relegation on the final day.

=== Peterborough United ===
On 30 August 2024, Ihionvien signed for EFL League One side Peterborough United on a three-year deal. He made his debut three days later coming on as a 60th minute substitution for Ricky-Jade Jones in an EFL Trophy match against Gillingham in which he also scored.

On 14 September 2024, Ihionvien made his EFL League One debut against Lincoln.

In November 2024, it was announced by the club that Ihionvien faced a number of months on the sidelines as a scan had revealed a 'strange growth' in his leg, which was revealed to be another bone. Ihionvien returned to action for Peterborough on 1 January 2025, coming on as a 62nd minute substitution for Malik Mothersille in a league match against Burton Albion.

On 28 April 2025, Ihionvien was transfer listed. Manager Darren Ferguson said Ihionvien had no future at the club, adding that "sometimes moves don't come off".

Contrary to the comments made at the end of the 2024/25 season, Ihionvien was retained. On 2 August 2025, Ihiovien scored on the opening day of the season from the penalty spot, against Cardiff City.

On 1 September 2025, Ihionvien signed for EFL League Two club Shrewsbury Town on loan until the end of the season. In October 2025 however, he suffered a knee injury in training requiring surgery, expected to rule him out for a period of four-to-six months.

== Personal life ==
Born in England, Ihionvien is of Nigerian descent.

== Career statistics ==
As of matches played 27 September 2025

Appearances and goals by club, season and competition
Club	Season	League			FA Cup		EFL Cup		Other		Total	
Club	Season	Division	Apps	Goals	Apps	Goals	Apps	Goals	Apps	Goals	Apps	Goals
Colchester United	2021–22	League Two	1	0	0	0	0	0	0	0	1	0
Colchester United	2022–23	League Two	0	0	0	0	0	0	0	0	0	0
Colchester United	2023–24	League Two	29	4	1	0	0	0	4 (Note: Appearance(s) in EFL Trophy)	1	34	5
Colchester United	2024–25	League Two	2	0	0	0	2	0	0	0	4	0
Colchester United	Total		32	4	1	0	2	0	4	1	39	5
Maldon & Tiptree (loan)	2022–23	Isthmian League; North Division	13	2	3	0	0	0	2 (Note: 1 appearance in the FA Trophy and 1 appearance and 1 goal in the Alan Turvey Trophy)	1	18	3
Peterborough United	2024–25	League One	11	0	0	0	0	0	4	2	15	2
Peterborough United	2025–26	League One	5	1	0	0	0	0	0	0	5	1
Peterborough United	Total		16	1	0	0	0	0	4	2	20	3
Shrewsbury Town (loan)	2025–26	League Two	4	1	0	0	0	0	1	1	5	2
Colchester United (loan)	2026-27	League Two	3	0	0	0	0	0	0	0	3	0
Career total			68	8	4	0	2	0	11	5	85	13
