= Harley Mills =

English footballer (born 2005)

Personal information
- Full name: Harley Mills
- Date of birth: 3 November 2005 (age 21)
- Place of birth: Birmingham, England
- Positions: Defender; midfielder

Team information
- Current team: Peterborough United
- Number: 14

Youth career
- 2012–2021: Aston Villa
- 2021–2023: Peterborough United

Senior career*
Years	Team	Apps	(Gls)
2023–	Peterborough United	46	(0)
2024	→ Enfield Town (loan)	8	(0)
- * Club domestic league appearances and goals as of 17:21, 20 October 2026 (UTC)

Harley Mills (born 3 November 2005) is an English professional footballer who plays as a defender for EFL League One club Peterborough United.

== Career ==
=== Peterborough United ===
Mills joined Peterborough United from Aston Villa in 2021 and went on to sign a two-year development contract with Peterborough in July 2021 after having helped Jamal Campbell-Ryce's under-18 team to finish third in the Professional Development League and won silverware in the Professional Development Cup and the David Joyce Cup He was reported to be a target for Premier League club Crystal Palace. as they reportedly placed multiple bids for the posh young star in the summer of 2022. He made his first-team debut on 29 August 2023, when he came on as a 79th-minute substitute for James Dornelly in a 1–1 draw at Portsmouth in an EFL Cup game.

On 13 April 2025, Mills started the 2025 EFL Trophy final, scoring a free-kick for the first goal and providing the cross from which Hector Kyprianou scored the second. He was subsequently named Man of the Match.

On 29 July 2025, Mills signed a new four year contract.

=== Enfield Town (loan) ===
On 6 September 2024, Mills joined National League South side Enfield Town on an initial one-month loan deal. He was recalled to Peterborough on 1 November 2024.

== Style of play ==
Mills has been described as a versatile and energetic player with a skilled left foot, who is most comfortable at left-back and in midfield.

== Personal life ==
Mills's father, Gary, is also a former professional footballer.

== Career statistics ==
As of match played 20 October 2026

Appearances and goals by club, season and competition
Club	Season	League			FA Cup		EFL Cup		Other		Total	
Club	Season	Division	Apps	Goals	Apps	Goals	Apps	Goals	Apps	Goals	Apps	Goals
Peterborough United	2023–24	League One	1	0	0	0	0	0	2 (Note: Appearances in the EFL Trophy)	0	3	0
Peterborough United	2024–25	League One	11	0	0	0	0	0	6	2	17	2
Peterborough United	2025–26	League One	24	0	2	0	1	0	2	1	30	1
Peterborough United	2026–27	League One	10	0	0	0	3	0	2	0	15	0
Peterborough United	Total		46	0	2	0	4	0	12	3	65	3
Enfield Town (loan)	2024–25	National League South	8	0	—		—		—		8	0
Career total			54	0	2	0	4	0	12	3	73	3

== Honours ==
Peterborough United

- EFL Trophy: 2024–25
