= Will Van Lier =

English footballer (born 2004)

Personal information
- Full name: William Lewis Van Lier
- Date of birth: 7 October 2004 (age 22)
- Position: Midfielder

Team information
- Current team: Kettering Town (on loan from King's Lynn Town)

Youth career
- 2012–2023: Peterborough United

Senior career*
Years	Team	Apps	(Gls)
2023–2024	Peterborough United	0	(0)
2024–2025	Peterborough Sports	39	(1)
2025–	King's Lynn Town	8	(0)
2025	→ Leamington (loan)	7	(0)
2026–	→ Kettering Town (loan)	0	(0)
- * Club domestic league appearances and goals as of 15:14, 25 February 2026 (UTC)

William Lewis Van Lier (born 7 April 2004) is an English professional footballer who plays as a midfielder for Kettering Town on loan from National League North club King's Lynn Town.

== Career ==
Van Lier joined the youth system at Peterborough United in 2012 and was part of the team that reached the FA Youth Cup fourth round in 2021–22. He won the LFE Goal of The Month award for March 2022. He signed a two-year professional development contract in May 2022. He made his first-team debut in an EFL Trophy game on 21 November 2023, when he came on as a 67th-minute substitute for Harley Mills in a 1–0 defeat at Colchester United.

On 12 May 2024, the club announced he would be released in the summer once his contract expired.

On 27 July 2024, Van Lier signed for Peterborough Sports after his contract expiration. He scored his first goal for the club in a 3–1 over Oxford City.

On 16 July 2025, Van Lier joined fellow National League North club King's Lynn Town. In September 2025, he joined Leamington on loan. In February 2026, he again departed on loan, joining Southern League Premier Division Central club Kettering Town.

== Career statistics ==
As of match played 17 March 2026

Appearances and goals by club, season and competition
Club	Season	League			FA Cup		EFL Cup		Other		Total	
Club	Season	Division	Apps	Goals	Apps	Goals	Apps	Goals	Apps	Goals	Apps	Goals
Peterborough United	2023–24	EFL League One	0	0	0	0	0	0	1 (Note: Appearances in the EFL Trophy)	0	1	0
Peterborough Sports	2024–25	National League North	39	1	2	0	—		2 (Note: Appearance(s) in FA Trophy)	0	43	1
King's Lynn Town	2025–26	National League North	7	0	0	0	–		0	0	7	0
Leamington (loan)	2025–26	National League North	8	0	0	0	–		0	0	8	0
Kettering Town (loan)	2025–26	Southern League Premier Division Central	6	0	0	0	–		0	0	6	0
Career total			60	1	2	0	0	0	3	0	65	1
