= Tyler Young (footballer) =

English footballer (born 2006)

Personal information
- Full name: Tyler Jay Young
- Date of birth: 4 June 2006 (age 20)
- Place of birth: Stevenage, England
- Height: 1.77 m (5 ft 9 1/2 in)
- Position: Midfielder

Team information
- Current team: Stamford

Youth career
- Arsenal
- Milton Keynes Dons
- –2024: Queens Park Rangers

Senior career*
Years	Team	Apps	(Gls)
2024–2025	Peterborough United	0	(0)
2025–2026	Ipswich Town	0	(0)
2025	→ Chatham Town (loan)	0	(0)
2026	→ Potters Bar Town (loan)	11	(0)
2026	Walton & Hersham	2	(0)
2026–	Stamford	0	(0)
- * Club domestic league appearances and goals as of 18:56, 1 September 2026 (UTC)

Tyler Jay Young (born 4 June 2006) is an English professional footballer who plays as a midfielder for Southern League Premier Division Central club Stamford.

== Early life ==
Young is the son of Ashley Young. In 2014, at the age of seven, he joined the football academy at Premier League club Arsenal. He later spent time in the academies of Milton Keynes Dons and Queens Park Rangers.

== Club career ==
After leaving Queens Park Rangers in the summer of 2024, Young joined League One side Peterborough United on a one-year contract after a brief trial. He made his debut for Peterborough on 8 October 2024 in the EFL Trophy against Stevenage, in a 2–0 win. In May 2025, it was announced that he would be leaving the club at the end of the season.

In August 2025, Young joined Championship side Ipswich Town's under-21 team, following a successful trial period. On 11 October 2025, Young joined Isthmian League Premier Division side Chatham Town on loan. In February 2026, he returned to the Isthmian Premier Division, joining Potters Bar Town on loan.

On 29 August 2026, Young joined newly-promoted National League South club Walton & Hersham following his departure from Ipswich Town.

After less than a month at Walton & Hersham, Young joined Southern League Premier Division Central side, Stamford on 25 September 2026.

== Personal life ==
He is the son of former professional footballer Ashley Young. He is of Jamaican descent through his father.

== Career statistics ==
=== Club ===
As of match played 31 August 2026

Appearances and goals by club, season and competition
Club	Season	League			National cup		League cup		Other		Total	
Club	Season	Division	Apps	Goals	Apps	Goals	Apps	Goals	Apps	Goals	Apps	Goals
Peterborough United	2024–25	League One	0	0	0	0	0	0	1 (Note: Appearance in EFL Trophy)	0	1	0
Ipswich Town	2025–26	Championship	0	0	0	0	0	0	—		0	0
Chatham Town (loan)	2025–26	Isthmian League Premier Division	0	0	0	0	—		1 (Note: Appearance(s) in Kent Senior Cup)	0	1	0
Potters Bar Town (loan)	2025–26	Isthmian League Premier Division	11	0	—		—		—		11	0
Walton & Hersham	2026–27	National League South	2	0	0	0	—		0	0	2	0
Stamford	2026–27	Southern League Premier Division Central	0	0	0	0	—		0	0	0	0
Career total			13	0	0	0	0	0	2	0	15	0
