= Donay O'Brien-Brady =

English footballer (born 2004)

Personal information
- Full name: Donay Kaylin O'Brien-Brady
- Date of birth: 15 January 2004 (age 22)
- Place of birth: London, England
- Position: Midfielder

Team information
- Current team: Peterborough United

Youth career
- Fulham
- Tottenham Hotspur
- 2020–2022: Huddersfield Town

Senior career*
Years	Team	Apps	(Gls)
2022–2023	Huddersfield Town	0	(0)
2023	→ Hyde United (loan)	3	(0)
2023–	Peterborough United	37	(1)
- * Club domestic league appearances and goals as of 22:10, 10 February 2026 (UTC)

Donay Kaylin O'Brien-Brady (born 15 January 2004) is an English professional footballer who plays as a midfielder for EFL League One club Peterborough United.

== Career ==
O'Brien-Brady spent time in the youth systems at Fulham and Tottenham Hotspur before he joined the Academy at Huddersfield Town in the summer of 2020, where he was assigned an IDP (Individual Development Plan) to improve his dribbling and shooting on the move. Primarily utilised as a winger, he was also played at left-back to help with his development. He signed a one-year contract extension with the club option of a second year in June 2022. On 15 January 2023, he joined Northern Premier League Premier Division side Hyde United on a one-month loan.

=== Peterborough United ===
Following a three-week trial, O'Brien-Brady signed a two-year deal with Peterborough United on 3 August 2023, with manager Darren Ferguson remarking that he would be involved in the senior squad. He made his first-team debut at London Road on 31 October 2023, when he came on as an 83rd-minute substitute for Joel Randall in a 3–1 win over Tottenham Hotspur U21 in the group stages of the EFL Trophy.

Following the conclusion of the 2025–26 season, the club announced that O'Brien-Brady had been listed available for transfer.

== Career statistics ==
As of match played 7 February 2026

Appearances and goals by club, season and competition
Club	Season	League			FA Cup		EFL Cup		Other		Total	
Club	Season	Division	Apps	Goals	Apps	Goals	Apps	Goals	Apps	Goals	Apps	Goals
Huddersfield Town	2022–23	EFL Championship	0	0	0	0	0	0	0	0	0	0
Hyde United (loan)	2022–23	Northern Premier League; Premier Division	3	0	0	0	0	0	0	0	3	0
Peterborough United	2023–24	EFL League One	0	0	0	0	0	0	2 (Note: Appearance(s) in EFL Trophy)	0	2	0
Peterborough United	2024–25	EFL League One	20	1	2	0	1	0	5	0	28	1
Peterborough United	2025–26	EFL League One	16	0	1	0	1	0	4	1	22	1
Peterborough United	Total		36	1	3	0	2	0	11	1	52	2
Career total			39	1	3	0	2	0	11	1	55	2
