= Gabriel Overton =

English footballer

Personal information
- Full name: Gabriel Drew Overton
- Date of birth: 15 February 2005 (age 21)
- Place of birth: Norwich, England
- Position: Forward

Team information
- Current team: Lowestoft Town

Youth career
- Peterborough United
- Norwich City
- Peterborough United

Senior career*
Years	Team	Apps	(Gls)
2022–2024	Peterborough United	0	(0)
2024	→ Peterborough Sports (loan)	4	(0)
2024–	Lowestoft Town	0	(0)
- * Club domestic league appearances and goals as of 20:37, 17 June 2024 (UTC)

Gabriel Drew Overton (born 15 February 2005) is an English semi-professional footballer who plays as a striker for Lowestoft Town.

== Early life ==
Overton spent time in the youth sides at both Peterborough United and Norwich City. Overton was also a talented tennis player and had to choose between following a football or tennis career. His initial focus had been on tennis whilst at Town Close School in Norwich, becoming Norfolk #1 approaching his teens. Consequently, he did not play much football before he was 13 and began attending Hethersett Academy in Norfolk. From the age of 14 Overton focused more on football. He signed a professional contract with Peterborough in May 2022 shortly after his 17th birthday.

== Career ==
Overton made his professional football debut as a 77th minute substitute for Ricky-Jade Jones in Peterborough's 2–0 EFL Cup first round win at Home Park against Plymouth Argyle on 10 August 2022, aged 17yrs 174dys, claiming an assist for Peterborough's second goal. Injuries cut short Overton's 2022/23 season. Fully recovered for the 2023/24 season Overton had hit 12 goals during pre-season and U21 fixtures at the Christmas 2023 break, including goals away at Liverpool and Aston Villa. Fine form that earned him a place on the bench for the FA Cup replay away at Salford on November 14 (Salford 4-4 Peterborough)... 5-4 to Peterborough on penalties.

In February 2024, Overton joined National League North side Peterborough Sports on a one-month loan deal. He made his debut on 20 February 2024, playing 64 minutes in a 2–1 victory over Curzon Ashton. His five game spell at the club saw 4 wins and a draw.

On 12 May 2024, Peterborough United announced he would be released in the summer once his contract expired.

In August 2024 Overton signed for Lowestoft Town on a two-year contract, with his first goal for the club coming in a 3-2 defeat away to Stamford United the following month.
