= Mahamadou Susoho =

Spanish footballer (born 2005)

Personal information
- Full name: Mahamadou Susoho Sissoho
- Date of birth: 20 January 2005 (age 21)
- Place of birth: Granollers, Spain
- Height: 5 ft 9 in (1.75 m)
- Position: Defensive midfielder

Team information
- Current team: Kocaelispor

Youth career
- 2013: Club Atlètic del Vallès
- 2013–2017: Espanyol
- 2017–2024: Manchester City

Senior career*
Years	Team	Apps	(Gls)
2023–2026	Manchester City	0	(0)
2024–2025	→ Peterborough United (loan)	15	(1)
2025–2026	→ Livingston (loan)	18	(1)
2026–	Kocaelispor	9	(0)

International career
2021	England U16	2	(0)
2021–2022	Spain U17	4	(0)
2021	Spain U18	3	(0)
- * Club domestic league appearances and goals as of 19:48, 26 May 2026 (UTC)

Mahamadou Susoho Sissoho (born 20 January 2005) is a Spanish professional footballer who plays as a defensive midfielder for Süper Lig club Kocaelispor. He has represented Spain and England at youth level.

== Early and personal life ==
Mahamadou was born in Spain to Gambian parents, and moved to Bradford with them at the age of eleven, he used to go to Laisterdyke Leadership Academy. He is fluent in Catalan.

== Club career ==
=== Manchester City ===
Susoho joined the Manchester City academy in 2017 from Espanyol. He signed his first professional contract with the club in July 2022. Promoted to the Man City U21 side for the 2023–24 season, he represented the club in the EFL Trophy in the latter half of 2023.

He was included in the Man City first team squad on 13 December 2023, and after being named as a substitute for a UEFA Champions League tie against Red Star Belgrade, he came on in the second half for his senior debut in a 3–2 away win. He was included in the Manchester City squad that travelled to Saudi Arabia to play in the 2023 FIFA Club World Cup, but never featured in any of the two games his team played.

==== Loan to Peterborough United ====
On 6 August 2024, Susoho joined League One club Peterborough United on a season-long loan deal. Following just one appearance, he returned to his parent club for treatment having injured himself in the warm-up of an EFL Cup tie against Oxford United, a serious muscle injury expected to rule him out for a period of four months. On 5 September, Peterborough chairman Darragh MacAnthony confirmed that Susoho was still on loan at Peterborough and would return after recovery. On 28 January 2025, Susoho scored his first goal for Peterborough in a 1–0 win against Wigan Athletic.

==== Loan to Livingston ====
On transfer deadline day, 1 September 2025, Susoho joined Scottish Premiership club Livingston on a season-long loan.

=== Kocaelispor ===
On 31 January 2026, Susoho completed a permanent transfer to Süper Lig club Kocaelispor.

== International career ==
Having previously played for England U16s, Susoho is a youth international for Spain, having played for its U17 and U18 teams.

== Style of play ==
He plays as a defensive midfielder.

== Career statistics ==
As of match played 24 January 2025

Appearances and goals by club, season and competition
Club	Season	League			National cup (Note: Includes FA Cup, Scottish Cup)		League cup (Note: Includes EFL Cup, Scottish League Cup)		Europe		Other		Total	
Club	Season	Division	Apps	Goals	Apps	Goals	Apps	Goals	Apps	Goals	Apps	Goals	Apps	Goals
Manchester City U21	2023–24	—			—		—		—		2 (Note: Appearances in EFL Trophy)	0	2	0
Manchester City	2023–24	Premier League	0	0	0	0	0	0	1 (Note: Appearance in UEFA Champions League)	0	0	0	1	0
Peterborough United (loan)	2024–25	League One	15	1	0	0	0	0	—		2	0	17	1
Livingston (loan)	2025–26	Scottish Premiership	18	1	1	0	—		—		—		19	1
Career total			33	2	1	0	0	0	1	0	4	0	39	2

== Honours ==
Manchester City

- FIFA Club World Cup: 2023

Peterborough United

- EFL Trophy: 2024–25
