= Abraham Odoh =

English footballer

Personal information
- Full name: Abraham Ifoghale Odoh
- Date of birth: 25 June 2000 (age 26)
- Place of birth: Lambeth, England
- Height: 5 ft 6 in (1.68 m)
- Position: Winger

Team information
- Current team: Salford City
- Number: 14

Senior career*
Years	Team	Apps	(Gls)
2017–2018	Edgware Town	0	(0)
2018–2019	Tooting & Mitcham United	11	(0)
2019	→ Charlton Athletic (loan)	0	(0)
2019–2020	Charlton Athletic	0	(0)
2021–2023	Rochdale	79	(4)
2023–2024	Harrogate Town	42	(9)
2024–2026	Peterborough United	51	(5)
2026–	Salford City	4	(0)
- * Club domestic league appearances and goals as of 17:10, 5 September 2026 (UTC)

Abraham Ifoghale Odoh (born 25 June 2000) is an English footballer who plays as a winger for EFL League Two club Salford City.

== Club career ==
=== Non-League ===
Odoh signed for Edgware Town, making a singular cup appearance for the club, before joining Tooting & Mitcham United in 2018.

=== Charlton Athletic ===
Odoh signed for Charlton Athletic on loan on 8 February 2019. Odoh joined Charlton permanently at the end of the season. Odoh made his professional debut with Charlton Athletic in a 1–0 FA Cup loss to West Bromwich Albion on 4 January 2020.

On 2 July 2020, it was confirmed that Odoh had left Charlton after his contract expired.

=== Rochdale ===
On 26 February 2021, Odoh signed an 18-month contract with Rochdale.

=== Harrogate Town ===
On 5 July 2023, following Rochdale's relegation to the National League, Odoh signed for League Two club Harrogate Town for an undisclosed fee.

=== Peterborough United ===
On 21 May 2024, Odoh signed a three-year contract with Peterborough United. On 1 April 2025, Odoh scored a first senior career hat-trick, all three goals coming in the first half of a 4–3 victory over Crawley Town.

Following the conclusion of the 2025–26 season, the club announced that Odoh had been listed available for transfer.

=== Salford City ===
On 2 July 2026, Odoh signed a two-year contract at League Two side Salford City for an undisclosed fee.

== Personal life ==
Born in England, Odoh is of Nigerian descent.

== Career statistics ==
As of 5 September 2026

Appearances and goals by club, season and competition
Club	Season	League			FA Cup		League Cup		Other		Total	
Club	Season	Division	Apps	Goals	Apps	Goals	Apps	Goals	Apps	Goals	Apps	Goals
Edgware Town	2017–18	SSML Premier Division	0	0	0	0	–		1	0	1	0
Tooting & Mitcham United	2018–19	Isthmian South Central Division	11	0	2	0	–		4 (Note: Two appearances in Alan Turvey Trophy, one appearance in Surrey Senior Cup, one appearance in London Senior Cup)	0	17	0
Charlton Athletic (loan)	2018–19	League One	0	0	0	0	0	0	0	0	0	0
Charlton Athletic	2019–20	Championship	0	0	1	0	0	0	–		1	0
Rochdale	2020–21	League One	2	0	0	0	0	0	0	0	2	0
Rochdale	2021–22	League Two	32	3	3	0	2	0	1 (Note: Appearances in EFL Trophy)	0	38	3
Rochdale	2022–23	League Two	45	1	1	0	2	0	3	0	51	1
Rochdale	Total		79	4	4	0	4	0	4	0	91	4
Harrogate Town	2023–24	League Two	42	9	2	1	2	0	2	0	48	10
Peterborough United	2024–25	League One	38	5	3	2	1	0	8	4	50	11
Peterborough United	2025–26	League One	13	0	2	0	1	0	3	0	19	0
Peterborough United	Total		51	5	5	2	2	0	11	4	69	11
Salford CIty	2026–27	League Two	4	0	0	0	1	0	0	0	5	0
Career total			187	18	14	3	9	0	22	4	232	25

== Honours ==
Peterborough United

- EFL Trophy: 2024–25
