= Oscar Wallin =

Swedish footballer (born 2001)

Personal information
- Full name: Björn Oscar Tiger Wallin
- Date of birth: 9 July 2001 (age 25)
- Place of birth: Sundsvall, Sweden
- Height: 1.91 m (6 ft 3 in)
- Position: Centre-back

Youth career
- Essviks AIF
- –2020: GIF Sundsvall

Senior career*
| Years | Team | Apps | (Gls) |
| 2021 | Hudiksvalls FF | 27 | (1) |
| 2022–2024 | Degerfors IF | 29 | (0) |
| 2024–2025 | Peterborough United | 37 | (0) |
| Total | | 93 | (1) |
- * Club domestic league appearances and goals

Björn Oscar Tiger Wallin (born 9 July 2001) is a Swedish former footballer who played as a centre-back.

== Career ==
Wallin started his career in Essviks AIF, and played for the academy team of GIF Sundsvall. When he was not given a chance for their senior team, he joined Hudiksvalls FF in the third tier. Hudiksvall were relegated, but Wallin was signed by Degerfors IF, bypassing the second tier to sign for the Allsvenskan club. Wallin made his Allsvenskan debut on 2 April 2023 against Hammarby.

=== Peterborough United ===
On 1 August 2024, Wallin signed for EFL League One side Peterborough United for an undisclosed fee on a two year deal with an option for a third.

On 2 October 2025, Wallin left Peterborough by mutual consent, wanting to return to Sweden to continue his education.

On 15 December 2025, Wallin announced his retirement.

== Career statistics ==
As of 15 December 2025

Appearances and goals by club, season and competition
| Club | Season | League | | | National Cup (Note: Includes appearances in Svenska Cupen and FA Cup) | | League Cup (Note: Includes appearances in EFL Cup) | | Other | | Total | |
| Club | Season | Division | Apps | Goals | Apps | Goals | Apps | Goals | Apps | Goals | Apps | Goals |
|---|---|---|---|---|---|---|---|---|---|---|---|---|
| Hudiksvalls FF | 2021 | Ettan | 27 | 1 | 2 | 0 | — | | — | | 29 | 1 |
| Degerfors IF | 2022 | Allsvenskan | 0 | 0 | 4 | 1 | — | | — | | 4 | 1 |
| Degerfors IF | 2023 | Allsvenskan | 13 | 0 | 5 | 0 | — | | — | | 18 | 0 |
| Degerfors IF | 2024 | Superettan | 16 | 0 | 0 | 0 | — | | — | | 16 | 0 |
| Degerfors IF | Total | | 29 | 0 | 9 | 1 | 0 | 0 | 0 | 0 | 38 | 1 |
| Peterborough United | 2024–25 | League One | 34 | 0 | 2 | 0 | 1 | 0 | 4 (Note: Appearance(s) in EFL Trophy) | 0 | 41 | 0 |
| Peterborough United | 2025–26 | League One | 3 | 0 | 0 | 0 | 1 | 0 | 0 | 0 | 4 | 0 |
| Peterborough United | Total | | 37 | 0 | 2 | 0 | 2 | 0 | 4 | 0 | 45 | 0 |
| Career total | | | 93 | 1 | 13 | 1 | 2 | 0 | 4 | 0 | 112 | 2 |

== Honours ==
Peterborough United

- EFL Trophy: 2024–25
