= Chris Conn-Clarke =

Northern Irish footballer

Personal information
- Full name: Christopher Seamus Michael Conn-Clarke
- Date of birth: 22 November 2001 (age 24)
- Place of birth: Belfast, Northern Ireland
- Height: 1.76 m (5 ft 9 in)
- Position: Midfielder

Team information
- Current team: Peterborough United
- Number: 20

Youth career
- Linfield
- –2018: Glentoran

Senior career*
Years	Team	Apps	(Gls)
2018	Glentoran	1	(0)
2018–2021	Burnley	0	(0)
2020	→ Chorley (loan)	2	(0)
2021–2023	Fleetwood Town	4	(0)
2022	→ Altrincham (loan)	2	(0)
2022–2023	→ Altrincham (loan)	28	(9)
2023	→ Waterford (loan)	15	(1)
2023–2024	Altrincham	46	(23)
2024–	Peterborough United	27	(2)
2025–2026	→ Carlisle United (loan)	17	(1)

International career^{‡}
2017	Northern Ireland U17	2	(0)
2019	Northern Ireland U19	3	(0)
2021	Northern Ireland U21	6	(1)
- * Club domestic league appearances and goals as of 19:56, 14 September 2026 (BST) ‡ National team caps and goals as of 20:26, 1 October 2021 (UTC)

Christopher Seamus Michael Conn-Clarke (born 22 November 2001) is a Northern Irish professional footballer who plays as a midfielder for EFL League One side Peterborough United.

Having started his senior career at Glentoran, Conn-Clarke joined Premier League club Burnley as a scholar in 2018. He had a spell on loan at Chorley in 2020 and signed for Fleetwood Town on EFL League One in February 2021, making his debut in September of that year.

== Early life ==
Conn-Clarke is from Antrim.

== Club career ==
Having previously played for Linfield's youth academy, he joined Glentoran aged 11. In summer 2017, he was offered a scholarship by English Premier League club Burnley, but remained at Glentoran for the 2017–18 season due to his age. He made his senior debut for Glentoran on 28 April 2018 as a substitute in a 3–1 defeat to Ballinamallard United. He joined English Premier League club Burnley on a two-year scholarship in summer 2018. In summer 2020, he was given a one-year extension to his scholarship. In October 2020, he joined National League North club Chorley on a work experience loan, where he made 2 appearances.

In February 2021, it was announced that Conn-Clarke had joined Fleetwood Town on an 18-month contract with an option to extend by a year. On 1 July 2021, Fleetwood Town announced that his contract had been extended until the end on the 2022–23 season, with the option of a further year. He made his debut for the club on 25 September 2021 as a substitute in a 2–2 draw away to Cambridge United. On 4 February 2022, he was sent out on loan to National League side Altrincham on an initial one-month loan. In July 2022, Conn-Clarke returned to Altrincham until January 2023.

On 31 January 2023, Conn-Clarke signed for League of Ireland First Division club Waterford on a season long loan.

On 16 June 2023, Conn-Clarke signed for National League side Altrincham for a club record fee. Having scored twenty-three goals and assisted a further twelve, he was named National League Player of the Year for the 2023–24 season. Following his stellar season, Conn-Clarke was linked with moves away from Altrincham with a host of League One clubs interested.

In June 2024, Conn-Clarke signed for EFL League One side Peterborough United for an undisclosed fee on a three-year deal with an option for a fourth.

On 9 October 2025, Conn-Clarke joined Enterprise National League side Carlisle United until January 2026 with an option to extend until the end of the season. On 7 January, his loan was extended for the remainder of the season.

== International career ==
Conn-Clarke has represented Northern Ireland at under-17, under-19 and under-21 levels.

== Career statistics ==
As of match played 9 November 2024

Appearances and goals by club, season and competition
Club	Season	League			National Cup		League Cup		Other		Total	
Club	Season	Division	Apps	Goals	Apps	Goals	Apps	Goals	Apps	Goals	Apps	Goals
Glentoran	2017–18	NIFL Premiership	1	0	0	0	0	0	0	0	1	0
Burnley	2018–19	Premier League	0	0	0	0	0	0	0	0	0	0
Burnley	2019–20	Premier League	0	0	0	0	0	0	—		0	0
Burnley	2020–21	Premier League	0	0	0	0	0	0	—		0	0
Burnley	Total		0	0	0	0	0	0	0	0	0	0
Chorley (loan)	2020–21	National League North	2	0	0	0	—		—		2	0
Fleetwood Town	2021–22	League One	4	0	0	0	0	0	1 (Note: Appearance(s) in EFL Trophy)	0	5	0
Fleetwood Town	2022–23	League One	0	0	0	0	0	0	0	0	0	0
Fleetwood Town	Total		4	0	0	0	0	0	1	0	5	0
Altrincham (loan)	2021–22	National League	2	0	—		—		—		2	0
Altrincham (loan)	2022–23	National League	28	9	2	1	—		2 (Note: Appearances in FA Trophy)	0	32	10
Waterford (loan)	2023	LOI First Division	15	1	—		—		1 (Note: Appearance in Munster Senior Cup)	0	16	1
Altrincham	2023–24	National League	46	23	1	0	—		3 (Note: 2 appearances in FA Trophy, 1 appearance in National League play-offs)	0	50	23
Peterborough United	2024–25	League One	5	0	0	0	1	0	2	0	8	0
Career total			103	33	3	1	1	0	9	0	116	34

== Honours ==
Peterborough United

- EFL Trophy: 2024–25

Individual

- National League Player of the Season: 2023–24
- National League Team of the Season: 2023–24
