= Jed Steer =

Former English footballer (born 1992)

Personal information
- Full name: Jed John Steer
- Date of birth: 23 September 1992 (age 34)
- Place of birth: Norwich, England
- Height: 6 ft 0 in (1.83 m)
- Position: Goalkeeper

Youth career
- 2003–2009: Norwich City

Senior career*
| Years | Team | Apps | (Gls) |
| 2009–2013 | Norwich City | 0 | (0) |
| 2011 | → Yeovil Town (loan) | 12 | (0) |
| 2012 | → Cambridge United (loan) | 4 | (0) |
| 2013–2023 | Aston Villa | 19 | (0) |
| 2014 | → Doncaster Rovers (loan) | 13 | (0) |
| 2014–2015 | → Yeovil Town (loan) | 12 | (0) |
| 2015–2016 | → Huddersfield Town (loan) | 38 | (0) |
| 2018 | → Charlton Athletic (loan) | 19 | (0) |
| 2022 | → Luton Town (loan) | 3 | (0) |
| 2024–2025 | Peterborough United | 42 | (0) |
| Total | | 162 | (0) |

International career
| 2007–2008 | England U16 | 5 | (0) |
| 2008–2009 | England U17 | 7 | (0) |
| 2010–2011 | England U19 | 2 | (0) |
- * Club domestic league appearances and goals

Jed John Steer (born 23 September 1992) is an English former professional footballer who played as a goalkeeper.

Steer joined Villa from his hometown club Norwich City on 1 July 2013, after beginning his playing career with the Canaries. He also played on loan for Yeovil Town, Cambridge United, Doncaster Rovers and Charlton Athletic. He finished his career at Peterborough United, winning the EFL Trophy twice. Steer also played for England at under-16, under-17 and under-19 level..

He is married to Alice Steer, originally Alice Piper, who is a sports reporter for Sky News

== Early life ==
Born in Norwich, Norfolk, Steer joined the Norwich City Academy at the age of 9. He was spotted playing in goal and City invited the youngster for a trial. It was not long before he was offered a youth contract by them.

== Club career ==
=== Norwich City ===
Steer signed his first professional contract on his 17th birthday. He was first named as a substitute for the FA Cup Second round tie against Carlisle United in the 2009–10 season. Steer played a vital role in the 2010–11 FA Youth Cup; in the Third round, he saved a penalty in the last minute against Charlton Athletic to ensure Norwich won the game 1–0. His coach Ricky Martin said after the game;

"He's probably the best under-18 goalkeeper in the country, If ever you wanted somebody in goal Jed's the one and he stepped up and made a fantastic save."

Steer made his first-team debut on 28 January 2012, in a fourth round FA Cup 2–1 victory against West Bromwich Albion.

==== Yeovil Town (loan) ====
In July 2011, Yeovil Town confirmed that Steer had joined them on a three-month loan deal. Steer made his first senior appearance and Football League debut in the opening game of the 2011–12 Football League One season in which Yeovil lost 2–0 away to Brentford. He returned to Norwich on 13 October after suffering a thigh injury.

==== Cambridge United (loan) ====
Steer joined Cambridge United on a one-month loan deal on 9 November 2012, until 8 December 2012.

=== Aston Villa ===
On 26 June 2013, Aston Villa announced that they would sign Steer on 1 July when he became a free agent.

Steer became the number two goalkeeper at the club. He played in the League Cup second round win against Rotherham United 3–0, keeping a clean sheet. On 24 May 2015, Steer made his Premier League debut for Villa in a 1–0 loss against Burnley.

==== Doncaster Rovers (loan) ====
After the departure of Ross Turnbull to league counterparts Barnsley, Doncaster Rovers signed Steer on a three-month loan deal on 1 August 2014. On 31 October 2014, Steer's loan ended after 17 appearances in all competitions, recording six clean sheets.

==== Yeovil Town (loan) ====
On 31 October 2014, Yeovil Town re-signed Steer on loan from Aston Villa until 31 January 2015.

==== Huddersfield Town (loan) ====
On 11 September 2015, Steer joined Championship side Huddersfield Town on a one-month loan. He made his debut the next day in Town's 2–0 loss against Cardiff City. He played on loan for 2 months, before returning to Villa, but then he returned for another month from 26 November 2015. After that was completed on 26 December, he returned to Villa, but when the Winter transfer window opened, he returned to Huddersfield for the remainder of the season.

==== Charlton Athletic (loan) ====
On 10 August 2018, Steer joined League One side Charlton Athletic on a season-long loan. Steer was recalled by Aston Villa on Monday 31 December 2018 due to an injury to Orjan Nyland.

==== Return to Villa ====
Steer was recalled to cover for Villa's new signing Lovre Kalinić after Orjan Nyland was injured, but following an injury to Kalinic during a match against West Brom, Steer was subbed on at halftime. He then started the following match against Stoke City, and his impressive performance meant that he continued to play the next match against Derby, despite Kalinic returning from injury, before retaining his place in Villa's following match, the Second City Derby against Birmingham City. Steer's good performances continued, and he quickly became first-choice keeper for Dean Smith, which saw Steer become part of a record-breaking ten-league-game winning streak for Aston Villa. Steer starred in Aston Villa's Championship play-offs semi-final win against West Bromwich Albion, saving two penalties from Mason Holgate and Ahmed Hegazi in a 4–3 shoot-out win to help send Aston Villa to the play-off finals for a second consecutive year.

==== Luton Town (loan) ====
On 31 January 2022, Steer again returned to the Championship on loan, joining Luton Town on loan until the end of the 2021–22 season. He made his debut on 5 February, keeping a clean sheet in a 3–0 away victory over Cambridge United in the FA Cup. On 2 March 2022, Steer suffered an achilles tendon injury in a FA Cup game against Chelsea. Steer had previously suffered a partial tear to his achilles in a game for Villa in 2019, but it was not confirmed by Luton manager Nathan Jones if this injury was on the same foot, only that Steer's season was over.

==== Return to Villa ====
Steer did not make another appearance for Aston Villa, spending the entirety of the 2022–23 season unavailable for selection due to the injury suffered whilst on loan with Luton. In May 2023, Aston Villa announced that Steer's contract would not be renewed and he would be leaving that summer, ending a 10-year spell at the club.

=== Peterborough United ===
After departing Aston Villa as a player, Steer acted as a commentator and pundit on the club's online streaming platform Villa TV while studying for a UEFA B Coaching Licence.

On 4 January 2024, Steer returned to football, signing a short-term contract with League One club Peterborough United to provide cover for the injured Nicholas Bilokapic.

Steer made his debut for Peterborough United against Charlton Athletic on 13 January 2024, a game in which Peterborough would win 2–1. Steer's initial contract with the club ended after four matches, however, he signed a new deal with Peterborough on 1 February until the end of the 2023–24 season. On 18 June 2024, Steer signed a new two-year deal.

With a year left on his contract, Steer left Peterborough United by mutual consent on 7 May 2025.

On 28 October 2025, Steer announced his retirement from professional football at the age of 33.

== International career ==
As well as England eligibility through his birth in Norwich, Steer was able to represent Scotland through his mother's side of the family. He made his youth international début in October 2007 for the England U16s as his side lifted the Sky Sports Victory Shield, and were champions of the Montaigu Tournament in which Steer produced the match-winning penalty save.

In August 2008, he was called up for the England U17, aged 15, for friendly matches against Italy, Portugal and Israel. He made his England U17 debut against Armenia in October 2008. They went on to qualify for the UEFA European Under-17 Championship but very much under achieved and failed to qualify for the FIFA U-17 World Cup.

Steer made his England U19 debut against Cyprus in October 2010, keeping a clean sheet and saving a penalty in the process.

== Career statistics ==
As of match played 21 April 2025

Appearances and goals by club, season and competition
| Club | Season | League | | | FA Cup | | League Cup | | Other | | Total | |
| Club | Season | Division | Apps | Goals | Apps | Goals | Apps | Goals | Apps | Goals | Apps | Goals |
|---|---|---|---|---|---|---|---|---|---|---|---|---|
| Norwich City | 2011–12 | Premier League | 0 | 0 | 2 | 0 | 0 | 0 | — | | 2 | 0 |
| Norwich City | 2012–13 | Premier League | 0 | 0 | 0 | 0 | 0 | 0 | — | | 0 | 0 |
| Norwich City | Total | | 0 | 0 | 2 | 0 | 0 | 0 | — | | 2 | 0 |
| Yeovil Town (loan) | 2011–12 | League One | 12 | 0 | 0 | 0 | 1 | 0 | 1 (Note: Appearance in Football League Trophy) | 0 | 14 | 0 |
| Cambridge United (loan) | 2012–13 | Conference Premier | 4 | 0 | 0 | 0 | — | | 1 (Note: Appearance in FA Trophy) | 0 | 5 | 0 |
| Aston Villa | 2013–14 | Premier League | 0 | 0 | 1 | 0 | 2 | 0 | — | | 3 | 0 |
| Aston Villa | 2014–15 | Premier League | 1 | 0 | 0 | 0 | 0 | 0 | — | | 1 | 0 |
| Aston Villa | 2015–16 | Premier League | 0 | 0 | 0 | 0 | 0 | 0 | — | | 0 | 0 |
| Aston Villa | 2016–17 | Championship | 0 | 0 | 0 | 0 | 0 | 0 | — | | 0 | 0 |
| Aston Villa | 2017–18 | Championship | 0 | 0 | 1 | 0 | 3 | 0 | — | | 4 | 0 |
| Aston Villa | 2018–19 | Championship | 16 | 0 | 0 | 0 | 0 | 0 | 3 (Note: Three appearances in Championship play-offs) | 0 | 19 | 0 |
| Aston Villa | 2019–20 | Premier League | 1 | 0 | 0 | 0 | 3 | 0 | — | | 4 | 0 |
| Aston Villa | 2020–21 | Premier League | 0 | 0 | 0 | 0 | 2 | 0 | — | | 2 | 0 |
| Aston Villa | 2021–22 | Premier League | 1 | 0 | 0 | 0 | 2 | 0 | — | | 3 | 0 |
| Aston Villa | 2022–23 | Premier League | 0 | 0 | 0 | 0 | 0 | 0 | — | | 0 | 0 |
| Aston Villa | Total | | 19 | 0 | 2 | 0 | 12 | 0 | 3 | 0 | 36 | 0 |
| Doncaster Rovers (loan) | 2014–15 | League One | 13 | 0 | 0 | 0 | 3 | 0 | 1 | 0 | 17 | 0 |
| Yeovil Town (loan) | 2014–15 | League One | 12 | 0 | 4 | 0 | 0 | 0 | 0 | 0 | 16 | 0 |
| Huddersfield Town (loan) | 2015–16 | Championship | 38 | 0 | 0 | 0 | 0 | 0 | — | | 38 | 0 |
| Charlton Athletic (loan) | 2018–19 | League One | 19 | 0 | 0 | 0 | 0 | 0 | 1 (Note: Appearance in EFL Trophy) | 0 | 20 | 0 |
| Luton Town (loan) | 2021–22 | Championship | 3 | 0 | 2 | 0 | 0 | 0 | — | | 5 | 0 |
| Peterborough United | 2023–24 | League One | 17 | 0 | 0 | 0 | 0 | 0 | 5 (Note: Three appearances in EFL Trophy and two appearances in League One play-offs) | 0 | 22 | 0 |
| Peterborough United | 2024–25 | League One | 25 | 0 | 0 | 0 | 0 | 0 | 3 (Note: Appearance in EFL Trophy) | 0 | 28 | 0 |
| Peterborough United | Total | | 42 | 0 | 0 | 0 | 0 | 0 | 8 | 0 | 50 | 0 |
| Career total | | | 162 | 0 | 10 | 0 | 16 | 0 | 15 | 0 | 203 | 0 |

== Honours ==
Aston Villa

- EFL Championship play-offs: 2019

Peterborough United

- EFL Trophy: 2023–24, 2024–25
