= Emmanuel Fernandez (footballer) =

Footballer (born 2001)

Personal information
- Full name: Emmanuel Oluwasegun Opeyemi Fernandez
- Date of birth: 17 July 2001 (age 25)
- Place of birth: London, England
- Height: 1.94 m (6 ft 4 in)
- Position: Defender

Team information
- Current team: Rangers
- Number: 37

Youth career
- 2017–2018: Brentford

Senior career*
| Years | Team | Apps | (Gls) |
| 2018–2020 | Gillingham | 0 | (0) |
| 2019 | → Sheppey United (loan) | 10 | (0) |
| 2019 | → Margate (loan) | 1 | (0) |
| 2020–2021 | Ramsgate | 0 | (0) |
| 2021–2025 | Peterborough United | 38 | (5) |
| 2021 | → Spalding United (loan) | 1 | (0) |
| 2023 | → Barnet (loan) | 8 | (0) |
| 2025– | Rangers | 40 | (6) |

International career^{‡}
| 2026– | Nigeria | 4 | (1) |
- * Club domestic league appearances and goals as of 08:50, 22 November 2026 (UTC) ‡ National team caps and goals as of 16:59, 6 October 2026 (UTC)

Emmanuel Oluwasegun Opeyemi Fernandez (born 17 July 2001) is a professional footballer who plays as a defender for Rangers. Born in England, he plays for the Nigeria national team at international level.

== Club career ==
=== Early career ===
Fernandez began his career with Brentford and Gillingham, and whilst at Gillingham spent time on loan at Sheppey United and Margate. After being released by Gillingham he played for Ramsgate.

=== Peterborough United ===
Fernandez signed a two-year contract with Peterborough United in July 2021. He made his debut on 2 April 2022 in a "surprise" selection in a 4–0 home defeat against Middlesbrough. In November 2021, Fernandez joined Spalding United on loan, making one appearance. In March 2023, he joined Barnet on loan until the end of the season.

=== Rangers ===
In July 2025, Fernandez joined Scottish Premiership club Rangers for an undisclosed fee.

On 22 November 2025, Fernandez scored his first league goal for Rangers in a 2–1 win over Livingston in the Scottish Premiership.

In February 2026, Fernandez suffered racist abuse online following a match.

In October 2026 he was defended by Rangers manager Derek McInnes following criticism aimed at Fernandez.

== International career ==
In March 2026, Fernandez received his first call-up to the Nigeria national team. He made his international debut on 27 March, coming off the bench in a 2–1 victory against Iran. Four days later, he scored his first international goal in a 2–2 friendly draw with Jordan.

== Personal life ==
Fernandez was born in London, and is eligible to represent Nigeria. He wears number 37 to honour his brother who died at 37 years old. He is the youngest of 8 children.

== Career statistics ==
=== Club ===
As of match played 21 November 2026

Appearances and goals by club, season and competition
| Club | Season | League | | | National cup | | League cup | | Other | | Total | |
| Club | Season | Division | Apps | Goals | Apps | Goals | Apps | Goals | Apps | Goals | Apps | Goals |
|---|---|---|---|---|---|---|---|---|---|---|---|---|
| Gillingham | 2018–19 | League Two | 0 | 0 | 0 | 0 | 0 | 0 | 0 | 0 | 0 | 0 |
| Gillingham | 2019–20 | League Two | 0 | 0 | 0 | 0 | 0 | 0 | 0 | 0 | 0 | 0 |
| Gillingham | Total | | 0 | 0 | 0 | 0 | 0 | 0 | 0 | 0 | 0 | 0 |
| Sheppey United (loan) | 2018–19 | SCEL Premier Division | 10 | 0 | 0 | 0 | — | | 2 | 0 | 12 | 0 |
| Margate (loan) | 2019–20 | Isthmian League Premier Division | 1 | 0 | 1 | 0 | — | | 0 | 0 | 2 | 0 |
| Ramsgate | 2020–21 | Isthmian League South East Division | 0 | 0 | 0 | 0 | — | | 0 | 0 | 0 | 0 |
| Peterborough United | 2021–22 | Championship | 1 | 0 | 0 | 0 | 0 | 0 | 0 | 0 | 1 | 0 |
| Peterborough United | 2022–23 | League One | 0 | 0 | 0 | 0 | 0 | 0 | 0 | 0 | 0 | 0 |
| Peterborough United | 2023–24 | League One | 7 | 0 | 3 | 1 | 1 | 0 | 7 (Note: Six appearances and one goal in EFL Trophy, one appearance in League One play-offs) | 1 | 18 | 2 |
| Peterborough United | 2024–25 | League One | 30 | 5 | 3 | 0 | 1 | 0 | 8 (Note: Appearances in EFL Trophy) | 0 | 42 | 5 |
| Peterborough United | Total | | 38 | 5 | 6 | 1 | 2 | 0 | 15 | 1 | 61 | 7 |
| Spalding United (loan) | 2021–22 | Northern Premier League Division One Midlands | 1 | 0 | 0 | 0 | — | | 0 | 0 | 1 | 0 |
| Barnet (loan) | 2022–23 | National League | 8 | 0 | 0 | 0 | — | | 1 (Note: Appearance in FA Trophy) | 1 | 9 | 1 |
| Rangers | 2025–26 | Scottish Premiership | 27 | 5 | 1 | 0 | 1 | 1 | 4 (Note: Appearance(s) in UEFA Europa League) | 0 | 33 | 6 |
| Rangers | 2026–27 | Scottish Premiership | 13 | 1 | 0 | 0 | 3 | 0 | 4 | 0 | 20 | 1 |
| Rangers | Total | | 40 | 6 | 1 | 0 | 4 | 1 | 8 | 0 | 53 | 7 |
| Career total | | | 98 | 11 | 8 | 1 | 6 | 1 | 27 | 2 | 139 | 15 |

== Honours ==
Peterborough United

- EFL Trophy: 2024–25
