= Kwame Poku =

Footballer (born 2001)

Personal information
- Full name: Kwame Afriyie Adubofour Poku
- Date of birth: 11 August 2001 (age 25)
- Place of birth: Croydon, England
- Height: 1.79 m (5 ft 10 in)
- Positions: Midfielder; winger

Team information
- Current team: Queens Park Rangers
- Number: 17

Youth career
- Cray Wanderers

Senior career*
Years	Team	Apps	(Gls)
2017–2019	Cray Wanderers	0	(0)
2019	Worthing	12	(2)
2019–2021	Colchester United	62	(5)
2021–2025	Peterborough United	121	(27)
2025–	Queens Park Rangers	8	(0)

International career^{‡}
2021–	Ghana	1	(0)
- * Club domestic league appearances and goals as of 12:39, 1 February 2026 (UTC) ‡ National team caps and goals as of 10 May 2022 (UTC)

Kwame Afriyie Adubofour Poku (born 11 August 2001) is a professional footballer who plays for EFL Championship club Queens Park Rangers. Born in England, he represents Ghana internationally.

== Club career ==
Born in Croydon, Poku joined Worthing from Cray Wanderers in February 2019. With Cray Wanderers, he made one senior appearance in the Kent Senior Cup and scored twice in twelve appearances in the 2018–19 Isthmian League for Worthing. In May 2019, following a successful trial, he signed for Colchester United.

On 3 September 2019, Poku made his professional debut for Colchester in a 3–2 EFL Trophy win against Gillingham. He scored his first professional goal on 21 September 2019 in Colchester's 2–1 victory against Leyton Orient.

On 5 December 2019, Poku signed a new two-and-a-half-year deal with Colchester to keep him with the Essex club until summer 2022.

=== Peterborough United ===
On 2 August 2021, he signed a four-year contract with Peterborough United. On 1 October 2022, Poku scored his first Peterborough goal in a 3–2 win against Milton Keynes Dons.

Having scored three goals in four matches, Poku was named EFL League One Player of the Month for September 2024. His impressive form continued into the following month, seven goal involvements in six matches seeing him win the award for a second consecutive month.

On 7 May 2025, Peterborough United announced the departure of Ghanaian international Poku, following the conclusion of his contract with the League One side.

=== Queens Park Rangers ===
On 28 June 2025 Poku signed for Queens Park Rangers after agreeing compensation with Peterborough United, as applied to an under 23 out of contract player.

Poku made his debut on 9 August 2025 starting in a 1–1 draw with Preston North End at Loftus Road.

== International career ==
Born in England, Poku is of Ghanaian descent.

On 19 March 2021, Poku was called up to the Ghana national team for the first time for their 2021 Africa Cup of Nations qualifying games against South Africa and São Tomé and Príncipe. He made his debut on 28 March 2021 after coming on as a 79th-minute substitute for Mohammed Kudus in a 3–1 victory over São Tomé and Príncipe at the Accra Sports Stadium.

== Career statistics ==
=== Club ===
As of match played 26 April 2025

Appearances and goals by club, season and competition
Club	Season	League			FA Cup		EFL Cup		Other		Total	
Club	Season	Division	Apps	Goals	Apps	Goals	Apps	Goals	Apps	Goals	Apps	Goals
Colchester United	2019–20	League Two	29	5	1	0	2	0	6 (Note: Four appearances in EFL Trophy, two appearances in EFL League Two play-offs)	0	38	5
Colchester United	2020–21	League Two	33	0	1	0	1	0	2 (Note: Appearances in EFL Trophy)	1	37	1
Colchester United	Total		62	5	2	0	3	0	8	1	75	6
Peterborough United	2021–22	Championship	20	0	2	0	1	0	0	0	23	0
Peterborough United	2022–23	League One	37	4	2	1	1	0	4 (Note: Two appearances in EFL Trophy, two appearances and one goal in EFL League One play-offs)	1	44	6
Peterborough United	2023–24	League One	37	11	4	0	2	0	6 (Note: Four appearances and one goal in EFL Trophy, two appearances in EFL League One play-offs)	1	49	12
Peterborough United	2024–25	League One	27	12	2	0	0	0	2	0	31	12
Peterborough United	Total		121	27	10	1	4	0	12	2	147	30
Career total			183	32	12	1	7	0	20	3	222	36

=== International ===
As of match played 28 March 2021.

International statistics
National team	Year	Apps	Goals
Ghana	2021	1	0
Total		1	0

== Honours ==
Peterborough United

- EFL Trophy: 2023–24, 2024–25

Individual

- EFL League One Player of the Month: September 2024, October 2024
- Peterborough United Players' Player of the Season: 2024–25
- EFL League One Team of the Season: 2024–25
- PFA Team of the Year: 2024–25 League One
