= James Dornelly =

English footballer (born 2005)

Personal information
- Full name: James Daniel Dornelly
- Date of birth: 14 April 2005 (age 21)
- Place of birth: Peterborough, England
- Position: Defender

Team information
- Current team: Peterborough United
- Number: 33

Youth career
- 2013–2023: Peterborough United

Senior career*
Years	Team	Apps	(Gls)
2023–	Peterborough United	57	(3)

International career^{‡}
2024	England U20	2	(0)
- * Club domestic league appearances and goals as of 18:54, 15 August 2026 (BST) ‡ National team caps and goals as of 17:42, 20 December 2024 (UTC)

James Daniel Dornelly (born 14 April 2005) is an English professional footballer who plays as a defender for EFL League One club Peterborough United.

== Career ==
Dornelly joined the Peterborough United Academy in 2013 and progressed through the age groups despite missing the entirety of the 2020–21 season with injury. He signed a two-year Professional Development Contract in April 2023, due to start on 1 July. He made his first-team debut on 29 August, in a 1–1 draw at Portsmouth in an EFL Cup game.

== International career ==
On 15 November 2024, Dornelly made his England U20 debut during a 4–0 win over Germany at Chesterfield.

== Career statistics ==
As of match played 26 April 2025

Appearances and goals by club, season and competition
Club	Season	League			FA Cup		EFL Cup		Other		Total	
Club	Season	Division	Apps	Goals	Apps	Goals	Apps	Goals	Apps	Goals	Apps	Goals
Peterborough United	2023–24	League One	3	0	1	0	1	0	3 (Note: Appearance(s) in EFL Trophy)	0	8	0
Peterborough United	2024–25	League One	25	1	2	0	0	0	7	0	34	1
Career total			28	1	3	0	1	0	10	0	42	1

== Honours ==
Peterborough United

- EFL Trophy: 2023–24, 2024–25
