= Hector Kyprianou =

Footballer (born 2001)

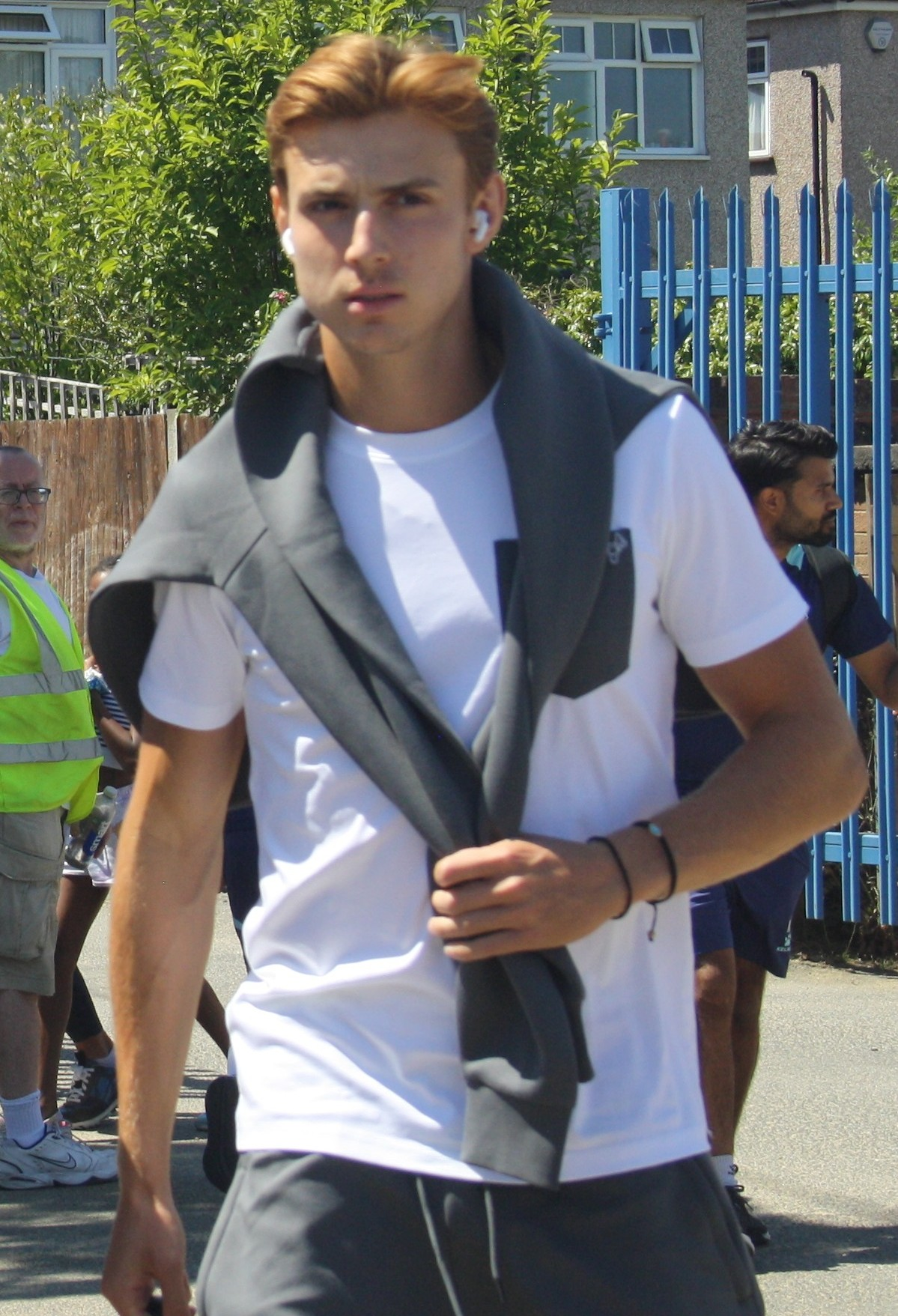
- Hector Kyprianou in 2025.

Personal information
- Full name: Hector Matthew Kyprianou
- Date of birth: 27 May 2001 (age 25)
- Place of birth: Enfield, England
- Height: 6 ft 3 in (1.91 m)
- Positions: Defensive midfielder; centre-back

Team information
- Current team: Watford
- Number: 5

Youth career
- 2009–2011: Omonia Youth
- 2011–2015: Tottenham Hotspur
- 2015–2019: Leyton Orient

Senior career*
Years	Team	Apps	(Gls)
2019–2022	Leyton Orient	66	(0)
2018	→ Harlow Town (loan)	3	(0)
2018–2019	→ Bishop's Stortford (loan)	16	(0)
2019	→ Hampton & Richmond Borough (loan)	1	(0)
2022–2025	Peterborough United	117	(14)
2025–	Watford	37	(1)

International career^{‡}
2019	Cyprus U19	6	(0)
2019	Cyprus U21	3	(1)
2023–	Cyprus	17	(0)
- * Club domestic league appearances and goals as of 29 October 2026 ‡ National team caps and goals as of 19:50, 12 November 2026 (UTC)

Hector Matthew Kyprianou (Greek: Έκτορ Ματθαίος Κυπριανού; born 27 May 2001) is a professional footballer who plays as a defensive midfielder or centre-back for EFL Championship club Watford. Born in England, he plays for the Cyprus national team.

== Career ==
=== Leyton Orient ===
A regular in Leyton Orient's U18 side during the 2017–18 season, Kyprianou went on a month's work experience loan to Harlow Town in August 2018, making three appearances.

In October, Kyprianou signed a similar deal with Bishop's Stortford which continued until March 2019. He made 21 appearances in all competitions.

In March 2019, Kyprianou signed on loan with National League South side Hampton & Richmond Borough, making one appearance, in the 3–1 league win at Billericay Town.

Kyprianou was called up to the Cyprus U19 squad in January 2019. He also signed a professional contract with Leyton Orient which began on 1 July 2019.

On 6 November, Kyprianou made his senior Orient debut in the EFL Trophy group stage match against Brighton & Hove Albion U21, which Orient won on penalties after a 1–1 draw. He also started the next match in the competition, the 1–1 draw in the second round at Bristol Rovers on 4 December, which Orient lost on penalties. He made his league debut on 7 December in the 1–1 draw at Oldham Athletic.

On 1 April 2021, Kyprianou signed a contract extension at Leyton Orient until 30 June 2023.

=== Peterborough United ===
On 22 June 2022, Kyprianou signed for League One club Peterborough United for an undisclosed fee on a three-year contract. Kyprianou scored his first football league goal and his first for Peterborough in a 3–0 win against Morecambe

During his time at Peterborough United, Kyprianou played a pivotal role in the club's success during the 2022–23 and 2023–24 seasons, featuring in back-to-back EFL League One play-offs. He also helped the team win two consecutive EFL Trophy finals at Wembley Stadium. In the 2025 final against Birmingham City, Kyprianou captained the side, scored in the match, and lifted the trophy. He served as club captain for the 2024–25 season.

On 6 May 2025, Peterborough announced Kyprianou would leave the club in June when his contract expired.

=== Watford ===
On 19 May 2025, Kyprianou agreed to join Championship club Watford on a five-year deal from 1 July.

== International career ==
Kyprianou played several times for the Cyprus under-19 team and Cyprus under-21 before being called up to the Cyprus national team in June 2021 when he was an unused substitute for the match against Ukraine. He made his debut on 12 October 2023 in a Euro qualifier against Norway.

== Career statistics ==
=== Club ===
As of match played 1 January 2026

Appearances and goals by club, season and competition
Club	Season	League			FA Cup		EFL Cup		Other		Total	
Club	Season	Division	Apps	Goals	Apps	Goals	Apps	Goals	Apps	Goals	Apps	Goals
Leyton Orient	2019–20	League Two	6	0	0	0	0	0	2 (Note: Appearances in EFL Trophy)	0	8	0
Leyton Orient	2020–21	League Two	22	0	1	1	0	0	2	0	25	1
Leyton Orient	2021–22	League Two	38	0	3	0	1	0	4	0	46	0
Total			66	0	4	1	1	0	8	0	79	1
Harlow Town (loan)	2018–19	Isthmian League Premier Division	3	0	0	0	–		–		3	0
Bishop's Stortford (loan)	2018–19	Isthmian League Premier Division	16	0	0	0	–		5 (Note: Four appearances in Alan Turvey Trophy, one appearance in Herts Senior Cup)	0	21	0
Hampton & Richmond (loan)	2018–19	National League South	1	0	0	0	–		–		1	0
Peterborough United	2022–23	League One	39	3	1	0	2	0	6 (Note: Four appearances in EFL Trophy, two appearances in EFL League One play-offs)	0	46	3
Peterborough United	2023–24	League One	44	8	2	0	2	0	8 (Note: Six appearances in EFL Trophy, two appearances in EFL League One play-offs)	0	54	8
Peterborough United	2024–25	League One	34	3	1	0	0	0	5	2	40	5
Peterborough United	Total		117	14	4	0	4	0	19	2	140	16
Watford	2025–26	Championship	22	0	0	0	1	0	0	0	23	0
Watford	2026-27	Championship	3	0	0	0	2	0	0	0	5	0
Career total			228	14	8	1	7	0	32	2	272	17

=== International ===
As of match played 12 November 2026

Appearances and goals by national team and year
National team	Year	Apps	Goals
Cyprus	2023	4	0
Cyprus	2024	6	0
Cyprus	2025	2	0
Cyprus	2026	5	0
Total		17	0

== Honours ==
Peterborough United

- EFL Trophy: 2023–24, 2024–25
