= Nicholas Bilokapic =

Australian soccer player

Personal information
- Date of birth: 8 September 2002 (age 24)
- Place of birth: Camperdown, New South Wales, Australia
- Height: 1.96 m (6 ft 5 in)
- Position: Goalkeeper

Team information
- Current team: Derby County
- Number: 39

Youth career
- 2014–2019: Sydney United 58
- 2020–2021: Huddersfield Town

Senior career*
Years	Team	Apps	(Gls)
2021–2023	Huddersfield Town	6	(0)
2022	→ Hartlepool United (loan)	2	(0)
2023–2026	Peterborough United	48	(0)
2026	Ipswich Town	0	(0)
2026–	Derby County	0	(0)

International career^{‡}
2019	Australia U17	1	(0)
2022–	Australia U23	6	(0)
- * Club domestic league appearances and goals as of 11:50, 10 February 2026 (UTC) ‡ National team caps and goals as of 27 March 2024

Nicholas Bilokapic (born 8 September 2002) is an Australian professional soccer player who plays for Derby County as a goalkeeper.

== Club career ==
Bilokapic began his career with Sydney United 58. He initially started as an outfielder with Sydney United 58 and first played as a goalkeeper at the relatively late age of 15. Bilokapic moved to English club Huddersfield Town in 2020, where he made his senior debut on 8 January 2022 in the FA Cup in a 2–1 win against Burnley. He moved on loan to Hartlepool United on 31 January for the remainder of the 2021–22 season.

Bilokapic transferred to Peterborough United in July 2023, for an undisclosed fee. After making errors in a derby game, he was supported by Peterborough manager Darren Ferguson.

On 4 November 2023, Bilokapic made two major errors in a first round FA Cup game at home against Salford that both resulted in goals. The game ended 2-2 and Ferguson expressed unhappiness with the goalkeeper, saying the mistakes had been "momentum killers".

On 6 May 2025, Peterborough announced the player had been transfer listed.

On 2 February 2026, Bilokapic left Peterborough by mutual consent. Later that month he signed for Ipswich Town.

After leaving Ipswich during the summer, he signed for Derby County in September 2026.

== International career ==
On 6 September 2019, Bilokapic made his Australia under-17 debut in a 3–2 defeat against England under-18s. He was selected as part of the Australia squad for the 2019 FIFA U-17 World Cup, however Bilokapic failed to make an appearance at the tournament.

In March 2022, Bilokapic was called up for an U23 Talent Identification Camp for Australian players based in the United Kingdom and Europe. He played for the U23 side that finished third in the 2023 Maurice Revello Tournament.

== Personal life ==
Bilokapic is of Croatian heritage. He is the nephew of former Australian international Paul Bilokapic. His father, Jerry Bilokapic, is currently the Head U16s coach for Western Sydney Wanderers

== Career statistics ==
As of match played 9 August 2025

Appearances and goals by club, season and competition
Club	Season	League			FA Cup		EFL Cup		Other		Total	
Club	Season	Division	Apps	Goals	Apps	Goals	Apps	Goals	Apps	Goals	Apps	Goals
Huddersfield Town	2020–21	Championship	0	0	0	0	0	0	—		0	0
Huddersfield Town	2021–22	Championship	0	0	1	0	0	0	0	0	1	0
Huddersfield Town	2022–23	Championship	6	0	1	0	0	0	—		7	0
Huddersfield Town	Total		6	0	2	0	0	0	0	0	8	0
Hartlepool United (loan)	2021–22	League Two	2	0	—		0	0	0	0	2	0
Peterborough United	2023–24	League One	28	0	2	0	2	0	1	0	33	0
Peterborough United	2024–25	League One	18	0	3	0	1	0	4	0	26	0
Peterborough United	2025–26	League One	2	0	0	0	0	0	0	0	2	0
Peterborough United	Total		48	0	5	0	3	0	5	0	61	0
Ipswich Town	2025–26	Championship	0	0	0	0	0	0	0	0	0	0
Derby County	2026–27	Championship	0	0	0	0	0	0	0	0	0	0
Career total			56	0	7	0	3	0	5	0	71	0

== Honours ==
Peterborough United

- EFL Trophy: 2023–24, 2024–25
