= Malik Mothersille =

Jamaican footballer (born 2003)

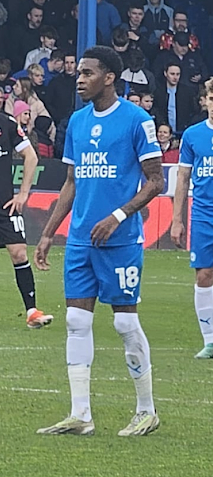
- Mothersille in 2024

Personal information
- Full name: Malik Maine Mothersille
- Date of birth: 23 October 2003 (age 23)
- Place of birth: Croydon, England
- Height: 1.87 m (6 ft 2 in)
- Position: Forward

Team information
- Current team: Wycombe Wanderers (on loan from Stockport County)
- Number: 29

Youth career
- –2020: Leyton Orient
- 2020–2023: Chelsea
- 2021: → Derby County (youth loan)

Senior career*
Years	Team	Apps	(Gls)
2023–2025	Peterborough United	67	(15)
2025–	Stockport County	30	(2)
2026–	→ Wycombe Wanderers (loan)	3	(0)

International career^{‡}
2025–	Jamaica	1	(0)
- * Club domestic league appearances and goals as of 11 October 2026 (UTC) ‡ National team caps and goals as of 3 August 2025

Malik Maine Mothersille (born 23 October 2003) is a professional footballer who plays as a forward for EFL League One club Wycombe Wanderers, on loan from Stockport County. Born in England, he plays for the Jamaica national team.

== Club career ==
=== Early career ===
Born in London, Mothersille began his career in the academy of Leyton Orient. In January 2020, it was reported that Leyton Orient had agreed a deal with Premier League side Chelsea for Mothersille to join as a scholar the following season. This was confirmed by Chelsea in July 2020, when Mothersille was announced among the new scholars for the 2020–21 season. However, having failed to establish himself in Chelsea's under-18 team, making only one substitute appearance, he was loaned to Derby County to feature for their youth sides on 1 February 2021.

The following season proved more successful at Chelsea for Mothersille; having scored consecutive braces in the EFL Trophy against former side Leyton Orient and Peterborough United, Mothersille was called up to Chelsea's first team squad for a mid-season, warm-weather training camp in Abu Dhabi, and he featured as a substitute in Chelsea's 1–0 friendly loss to Aston Villa — his first and only appearance for the club.

With his contract set to expire at the end of the 2022–23 season, it was reported by the Evening Standard that Mothersille was close to agreeing a new deal with Chelsea in January 2023. However, by May, he had still not accepted Chelsea's offer, and in August, with his contract having expired, he went on trial with fellow Premier League side Everton.

=== Peterborough United ===
On 2 September 2023, League One side Peterborough United announced that they had signed Mothersille on transfer deadline day, with an undisclosed compensation fee being agreed with Chelsea.

=== Stockport County ===
On 2 July 2025, Mothersille joined League One side Stockport County on a three-year deal for a club-record fee, eclipsing the £800,000 spent on Ian Thomas-Moore.

== International career ==
Born in England, Mothersille is of Jamaican descent through his parents and holds dual British-Jamaican citizenship. He was called up for Jamaica in the Unity Cup. On 19 May 2025, he made the preliminary 60-man squad for the Jamaica national team for the 2025 CONCACAF Gold Cup.

== Career statistics ==
=== Club ===
As of 11 November 2025

Appearances and goals by club, season and competition
Club	Season	League			FA Cup		EFL Cup		Other		Total	
Club	Season	Division	Apps	Goals	Apps	Goals	Apps	Goals	Apps	Goals	Apps	Goals
Chelsea U21	2021–22	—	—		—		—		1 (Note: Appearance(s) in EFL Trophy)	0	1	0
Chelsea U21	2022–23	—	—		—		—		3	4	3	4
Chelsea U21	Total		0	0	0	0	0	0	4	4	4	4
Peterborough United	2023–24	League One	22	3	2	0	0	0	9 (Note: Seven appearances and three goals in the EFL Trophy, two appearances in the EFL League One play-offs)	3	33	6
Peterborough United	2024–25	League One	45	12	3	0	1	0	8	4	57	16
Peterborough United	Total		67	15	5	0	1	0	17	7	90	22
Stockport County	2025–26	League One	8	1	0	0	0	0	2	0	10	1
Career total			75	16	5	0	1	0	23	11	104	27

=== International ===
As of match played 30 May 2025

Appearances and goals by national team and year
National team	Year	Apps	Goals
Jamaica	2025	1	0
Total		1	0

== Honours ==
Peterborough United

- EFL Trophy: 2023–24, 2024–25

Stockport County

- EFL Trophy runner-up: 2025–26

Individual

- Peterborough United Young Player of the Season: 2024–25
