= Ricky-Jade Jones =

Jamaican footballer (born 2002)

Personal information
- Full name: Ricky-Jade Jones
- Date of birth: 8 November 2002 (age 24)
- Place of birth: Peterborough, England
- Height: 1.83 m (6 ft 0 in)
- Position: Striker

Team information
- Current team: FC St. Pauli
- Number: 26

Youth career
- –2019: Peterborough United

Senior career*
Years	Team	Apps	(Gls)
2019–2025	Peterborough United	159	(24)
2025–	FC St. Pauli	13	(2)

International career
2026–	Jamaica	1	(0)
- * Club domestic league appearances and goals as of 17 October 2026

Ricky-Jade Jones (born 8 November 2002) is a professional footballer who plays as a striker for 2. Bundesliga club FC St. Pauli. Born in England, he represents Jamaica internationally.

== Career ==
Jones came from the Peterborough United academy. He made his first-team debut, aged 16, against Arsenal U21s in an EFL Trophy match in October 2019, signing his first professional contract on his 17th birthday. Manager Darren Ferguson stated that Jones "must be the quickest player I've ever managed and I've managed some quick ones. He's a talent, there's no doubt about that." In his second appearance and first start he scored his first goal for the club in an EFL Trophy tie against Cambridge United on 12 November 2019. The striker went on to score his second goal in as many games, scoring against Stevenage in an FA Cup replay on 19 November 2019. He went on to make his league debut on 23 November 2019 against Burton Albion.

On 6 May 2025, Peterborough announced Jones would leave the club in June when his contract expired. On 14 June 2025, Jones joined Bundesliga side FC St. Pauli.

== International career ==
On 14 November 2026, Jones made his international debut for Jamaica in a 3-2 victory against Mexico in Kingston, Jamaica, coming on as a late sub.

== Career statistics ==
As of match played 17 October 2026

Appearances and goals by club, season and competition
Club	Season	League			National cup (Note: Includes FA Cup, DFB-Pokal)		EFL Cup		Other		Total	
Club	Season	Division	Apps	Goals	Apps	Goals	Apps	Goals	Apps	Goals	Apps	Goals
Peterborough United	2019–20	League One	11	0	2	2	0	0	3 (Note: Appearances in EFL Trophy)	2	16	4
Peterborough United	2020–21	League One	15	1	0	0	0	0	2	0	17	1
Peterborough United	2021–22	Championship	18	0	3	1	1	0	—		22	1
Peterborough United	2022–23	League One	26	3	2	0	2	1	5 (Note: Three appearances two goals in EFL Trophy, two appearances in League One play-offs)	2	35	6
Peterborough United	2023–24	League One	43	9	4	1	3	0	6 (Note: Four appearances and two goals in EFL Trophy, two appearances in EFL League One play-offs)	2	56	12
Peterborough United	2024–25	League One	46	11	3	4	1	0	7	3	57	18
Peterborough United	Total		159	24	14	8	7	1	23	9	203	42
FC St. Pauli	2025–26	Bundesliga	9	2	1	0	—		—		10	2
FC St. Pauli	2026–27	2. Bundesliga	4	0	1	0	—		—		5	0
FC St. Pauli	Total		13	2	2	0	—		—		15	2
Career total			172	26	16	8	7	1	23	9	218	44

== Honours ==
Peterborough United

- EFL Trophy: 2023–24, 2024–25
