= 2023–24 Peterborough United F.C. season =

90th season in existence of Peterborough United FC

Peterborough United
2023–24 season
- Owner: Darragh MacAnthony (75%); Kelgary Sports and Entertainment (20%); IRC Investments Limited (5%)
- Chairman: Darragh MacAnthony
- Manager: Darren Ferguson
- Stadium: Weston Homes Stadium
- League One: 4th (lost in play-off semi-finals)
- FA Cup: Third round
- EFL Cup: Third round
- EFL Trophy: Winners
- Top goalscorer: League: Ephron Mason-Clark (14); All: Ephron Mason-Clark (19)
- Average home league attendance: 8,845

The 2023–24 season was the 90th season in the history of Peterborough United and their second consecutive season in League One. The club participated in League One, the FA Cup, the EFL Cup, and the 2023–24 EFL Trophy.

== Current squad ==
As of 12 March 2024

No.	Name	Position	Nationality	Place of birth	Date of birth (age)	Previous club	Date signed	Fee	Contract end
Goalkeepers
1	Nicholas Bilokapic	GK	(Australia) (Croatia)	Camperdown	8 September 2002 (age 24)	Huddersfield Town	21 July 2023	Undisclosed	30 June 2026
13	Will Blackmore	GK	(England)	Brighton	1 October 2001 (age 25)	Academy	7 August 2020	Trainee	30 June 2026
21	Jed Steer	GK	(England) (Scotland)	Norwich	23 September 1992 (age 34)	Aston Villa	4 January 2024	Free	30 June 2024
25	Fynn Talley	GK	(England)	Bexley	14 September 2002 (age 24)	Brighton & Hove Albion	27 July 2023	Free	30 June 2025
33	Jake West	GK	(England)			Academy	12 September 2023	Trainee	30 June 2024
Defenders
2	Jadel Katongo	CB	(England) (Zambia)	Manchester	14 September 2004 (age 22)	Manchester City	29 August 2023	Loan	31 May 2024
4	Ronnie Edwards	CB	(England)	Harlow	28 March 2003 (age 23)	Barnet	10 August 2020	Undisclosed	30 June 2025
5	Josh Knight	CB	(England)	Fleckney	7 September 1997 (age 29)	Leicester City	2 July 2021	Undisclosed	30 June 2024
6	Romoney Crichlow	CB	(England)	Luton	3 June 1999 (age 27)	Huddersfield Town	1 July 2023	Free	30 June 2025
12	Vontae Daley-Campbell	RB	(England) (Jamaica)	Clapham	2 April 2001 (age 25)	(Wales) Cardiff City	14 February 2024	Free	30 June 2024
20	Emmanuel Fernandez	CB	(England) (Nigeria)		17 July 2001 (age 25)	Ramsgate	12 July 2021	Undisclosed	30 June 2024
31	Benjamin Arthur	CB	(England)		9 October 2005 (age 21)	Academy	8 August 2023	Trainee	30 June 2024
36	James Dornelly	CB	(England)		14 April 2005 (age 21)	Academy	3 November 2023	Trainee	30 June 2025
37	Harley Mills	CB	(England)		3 November 2005 (age 21)	Academy	8 August 2023	Trainee	30 June 2024
44	Tom Unwin	CB	(England)			Academy	20 November 2023	Trainee	30 June 2024
46	Luke Gilbert	CB	(England)			Academy	20 November 2023	Trainee	30 June 2024
Midfielders
3	Harrison Burrows	LM	(England)	Murrow	12 January 2002 (age 24)	Academy	1 July 2019	Trainee	30 June 2024
7	Jeando Fuchs	DM	(Cameroon) (France)	Yaoundé	11 October 1997 (age 29)	(Scotland) Dundee United	28 January 2022	£800,000	30 June 2024
8	Ryan de Havilland	CM	(England)	London	15 June 2001 (age 25)	Barnet	26 June 2023	Undisclosed	30 June 2027
11	Kwame Poku	AM	(Ghana) (England)	Croydon	11 August 2001 (age 25)	Colchester United	2 August 2021	Undisclosed	30 June 2025
22	Hector Kyprianou	DM	(Cyprus) (England)	Enfield	27 May 2001 (age 25)	Leyton Orient	1 July 2022	Undisclosed	30 June 2025
27	Archie Collins	CM	(England)	Taunton	31 August 1999 (age 27)	Exeter City	28 June 2023	Undisclosed	30 June 2027
34	Harry Titchmarsh	DM	(England)		4 April 2005 (age 21)	West Ham United	1 July 2021	Free	30 June 2024
35	Donay O'Brien-Brady	CM	(England)	London	15 January 2004 (age 22)	Huddersfield Town	3 August 2023	Free	30 June 2025
38	Gabriel Overton	CM	(England)		5 January 2005 (age 21)	Academy	25 May 2022	Trainee	30 June 2024
43	Will Van Lier	CM	(England)		7 October 2004 (age 22)	Academy	1 July 2022	Trainee	30 June 2024
Forwards
9	Jonson Clarke-Harris	CF	(Jamaica) (England)	Leicester	21 July 1994 (age 32)	Bristol Rovers	27 August 2020	£1,250,000	30 June 2024
10	Ephron Mason-Clark	CF	(England)	Lambeth	25 August 1999 (age 27)	Coventry City	1 February 2024	Loan	31 May 2024
14	Joel Randall	LW	(England)	Salisbury	29 October 1999 (age 27)	Exeter City	3 August 2021	£1,000,000	30 June 2025
15	Michael Olakigbe	RW	(England) (Nigeria)	Lambeth	25 April 2004 (age 22)	Brentford	30 January 2024	Loan	31 May 2024
16	David Ajiboye	RW	(England) (Nigeria)	Bromley	28 September 1998 (age 28)	Sutton United	1 July 2022	Undisclosed	30 June 2025
17	Ricky-Jade Jones	CF	(England)	Peterborough	8 November 2002 (age 24)	Academy	1 January 2020	Trainee	30 June 2025
18	Malik Mothersille	CF	(England) (Jamaica)	London	23 October 2003 (age 23)	Chelsea	2 September 2023	Compensation	30 June 2025
28	Jacob Wakeling	CF	(England)	Redditch	15 September 2001 (age 25)	Swindon Town	1 September 2023	Undisclosed	30 June 2026
45	Joe Davies	CF	(England)			Academy	20 November 2023	Trainee	30 June 2024
47	Pemi Aderoju	CF	(England)		5 May 2004 (age 22)	Biggleswade Town	5 January 2024	Undisclosed	30 June 2025
Out on Loan
19	Kabongo Tshimanga	CF	(England) (Democratic Republic of the Congo)	Kinshasa	22 September 1997 (age 29)	Chesterfield	15 June 2023	Undisclosed	30 June 2025
23	Kai Corbett	RW	(Spain) (England)	Barcelona	8 October 2002 (age 24)	West Ham United	15 November 2021	Free	30 June 2025
24	Charlie O'Connell	CB	(England)		19 December 2002 (age 23)	West Ham United	8 January 2019	Free	30 June 2025

== Transfers ==
=== In ===
Date	Pos	Player	Transferred from	Fee	Ref
15 June 2023	CF	(England) Kabongo Tshimanga	(England) Chesterfield	Undisclosed	
26 June 2023	CM	(England) Ryan De Havilland	(England) Barnet	Undisclosed	
28 June 2023	CM	(England) Archie Collins	(England) Exeter City	Undisclosed	
1 July 2023	CB	(England) Romoney Crichlow	(England) Huddersfield Town	Free Transfer	
1 July 2023	CF	(England) David Kawa †	(England) AFC Wimbledon	Undisclosed	
21 July 2023	GK	(Australia) Nicholas Bilokapic	(England) Huddersfield Town	Undisclosed	
27 July 2023	GK	(England) Fynn Talley	(England) Brighton & Hove Albion	Free Transfer	
1 September 2023	CF	(England) Jacob Wakeling	(England) Swindon Town	Undisclosed	
2 September 2023	CF	(England) Malik Mothersille	(England) Chelsea	Undisclosed	
4 January 2024	GK	(England) Jed Steer	Free agent	—N/a	
5 January 2024	CF	(England) Pemi Aderoju †	(England) Biggleswade Town	Undisclosed	
14 February 2024	RB	(England) Vontae Daley-Campbell	(Wales) Cardiff City	Free Transfer	

† Signed for Under-21s

=== Out ===
Date	Pos	Player	Transferred to	Fee	Ref
26 June 2023	CM	(Republic of Ireland) Jack Taylor	(England) Ipswich Town	Undisclosed	
28 June 2023	CM	(England) Ben Thompson	(England) Stevenage	Undisclosed	
29 June 2023	CM	(Grenada) Oliver Norburn	(England) Blackpool	Undisclosed	
30 June 2023	AM	(England) Kellan Hickinson	(England) St Ives Town	Free Transfer	
30 June 2023	RB	(Italy) Benjamin Mensah	(England) St Ives Town	Released	
30 June 2023	RW	(England) Andrew Oluwabori	(England) FC Halifax Town	Free Transfer	
30 June 2023	CB	(England) Nathan Thompson	(England) Stevenage	Released	
30 June 2023	RM	(England) Joe Ward	(England) Derby County	Free Transfer	
7 July 2023	LB	(England) Dan Butler	(England) Stevenage	Undisclosed	
11 July 2023	GK	(England) Christy Pym	(England) Mansfield Town	Undisclosed	
24 July 2023	CB	(England) Frankie Kent	(Scotland) Heart of Midlothian	Undisclosed	
31 August 2023	CB	(England) Benjamin Arthur	(England) Brentford	Undisclosed	
1 September 2023	LB	(England) Joe Tomlinson	(England) Milton Keynes Dons	Undisclosed	
1 February 2024	LW	(England) Ephron Mason-Clark	(England) Coventry City	Undisclosed	

=== Loaned in ===
Date	Pos	Player	Loaned from	Until	Ref
18 July 2023	RB	(Republic of Ireland) Peter Kioso	(England) Rotherham United	2 January 2024 (Note: On 2 January, Kioso was recalled early from his season-long loan from Rotherham.)	
29 August 2023	CB	(England) Jadel Katongo	(England) Manchester City	End of Season	
31 August 2023	LB	(England) Zak Sturge	(England) Chelsea	2 January 2024 (Note: On 2 January, Sturge was recalled early from his season-long loan from Chelsea.)	
30 January 2024	RW	(England) Michael Olakigbe	(England) Brentford	End of Season	
1 February 2024	LW	(England) Ephron Mason-Clark	(England) Coventry City	End of Season	

=== Loaned out ===
Date	Pos	Player	Loaned to	Until	Ref
26 July 2023	CM	(Scotland) MacKenzie Lamb	(England) Alvechurch	31 December 2023	
26 July 2023	CM	(England) Roddy McGlinchey	(England) Peterborough Sports	1 December 2023 (Note: On 1 December, McGlinchey's loan at Peterborough Sports was cut short and was subsequently loaned to Coalville Town.)	
15 August 2023	CF	(England) Lewis Darlington	(England) Cambridge City	31 December 2023	
28 August 2023	LB	(England) Aaron Powell	(England) Bishop's Stortford	21 December 2023	
1 September 2023	CF	(England) Kabongo Tshimanga	(England) Fleetwood Town	1 February 2024 (Note: On 1 February, Tshimanga's loan at Fleetwood was cut short and he was subsequently loaned to Boreham Wood.)	
18 September 2023	CM	(England) Harry Thomas	(England) AFC Totton	16 October 2023	
6 October 2023	CB	(England) Charlie O'Connell	(England) Woking	4 November 2023	
4 November 2023	CF	(England) Reuben Marshall	(England) AFC Sudbury	1 January 2024	
11 November 2023	CB	(England) Oliver Rose	(England) Corby Town	9 December 2023	
1 December 2023	CM	(England) Roddy McGlinchey	(England) Coalville Town	31 December 2023	
22 December 2023	LB	(England) Aaron Powell	(England) King's Lynn Town	20 January 2024	
1 February 2024	CF	(England) Kabongo Tshimanga	(England) Boreham Wood	End of Season	
9 March 2024	CB	(England) Charlie O'Connell	(England) Oxford City	End of Season	
12 March 2024	RW	(England) Kai Corbett	(England) Scunthorpe United	End of Season	

== Pre-season and friendlies ==
On 26 May, The Posh confirmed their first pre-season friendly fixture, against Stamford. A second friendly was confirmed in early-June, against Colchester United. A day later, a third fixture, to honour Barry Fry was confirmed against Birmingham City. In early-July, a fourth fixture against Bedford Town was announced. On 20 July, Peterborough announced a further friendly, against Peterborough Sports.

Win Draw Loss Fixtures

8 July 2023 Friendly	Stamford	1–7	Peterborough United	Stamford
15:00 BST	Duffy 26'	Report	Clarke-Harris 23' (pen.); Jones 39'; Ajiboye 44'; Tshimanga 54', 60', 67'; Poku 69'	Stadium: Zeeco Stadium; Attendance: 1,215

11 July 2023 Friendly	Leicester City	1–2	Peterborough United	Seagrave
12:00 BST	Pereira 39'	Report	Poku 3'; Tomlinson 82'	Stadium: Leicester City Training Ground; Attendance: 0 (Behind closed doors)

14 July 2023 Friendly	Peterborough United	1–3	Luton Town	Burton Upon Trent
13:00 BST	Clarke-Harris 65'	Report	Morris 28'; McAtee 68'; Pereira 70'	Stadium: St George's Park National Football Centre; Attendance: 0 (Behind closed doors)

22 July 2023 Friendly	Colchester United	1–1	Peterborough United	Colchester
15:00 BST	Chilvers 58' (pen.)	Report	Clarke-Harris 9'	Stadium: JobServe Community Stadium

25 July 2023 Friendly	Bedford Town	1–4	Peterborough United	Cardington
19:30 BST	Trialist E 87'		Tomlinson 7', 39'; Mason-Clark 47'; Fernandez 73'	Stadium: The New Eyrie; Attendance: 309

25 July 2023 Friendly	Peterborough Sports	1–0	Peterborough United	Peterborough
19:45 BST	Lawlor 29' (pen.)			Stadium: PIMS Park

29 July 2023 Friendly	Peterborough United	3–2	Birmingham City	Peterborough
15:00 BST	Poku 4'; Mason-Clark 10'; Kyprianou 11'		Hogan 33'; Jutkiewicz 90'	Stadium: Weston Homes Stadium; Referee: Neil Hair

29 July 2023 Friendly	Watford	3–0	Peterborough United	Watford
15:00 BST	Bayo 14', 76'; Martins 19'			Stadium: Vicarage Road; Attendance: 0 (Behind Closed Doors)

== Competitions ==
=== Overall record ===
Competition	Starting round	Final position	Record							
Competition	Starting round	Final position	Pld	W	D	L	GF	GA	GD	Win %
League One	Matchday 1		45	25	8	12	86	58	+28	55.56
FA Cup	First round	Third round	4	1	2	1	8	10	−2	25.00
EFL Cup	First round	Third round	3	0	3	0	4	4	+0	0.00
EFL Trophy	Group stage		7	6	0	1	16	4	+12	85.71
Total			59	32	13	14	114	76	+38	54.24

Last updated: 1 April 2024
Source: Soccerway

=== League One ===
==== League table ====
Pos	Team	Pld	W	D	L	GF	GA	GD	Pts	Promotion, qualification or relegation
1	Portsmouth (C, P)	46	28	13	5	78	41	+37	97	Promotion to EFL Championship
2	Derby County (P)	46	28	8	10	78	37	+41	92	Promotion to EFL Championship
3	Bolton Wanderers	46	25	12	9	86	51	+35	87	Qualification for League One play-offs
4	Peterborough United	46	25	9	12	89	61	+28	84	Qualification for League One play-offs
5	Oxford United (O, P)	46	22	11	13	79	56	+23	77	Qualification for League One play-offs
6	Barnsley	46	21	13	12	82	64	+18	76	Qualification for League One play-offs
7	Lincoln City	46	20	14	12	65	40	+25	74	

Source: EFL Official Website
Rules for classification: 1) Points; 2) Goal difference; 3) Number of goals scored; 4) Head-to-head results; 5) Wins; 6) Away goals; 7) Penalty points (sec 9.5); 8) 12-point sending off offences
(C) Champions; (O) Play-off winners; (P) Promoted

==== Results summary ====
Overall								Home						Away					
Pld	W	D	L	GF	GA	GD	Pts	W	D	L	GF	GA	GD	W	D	L	GF	GA	GD
46	25	9	12	89	61	+28	84	13	5	5	55	28	+27	12	4	7	34	33	+1

Last updated: 13 May 2024.
Source: Soccerway

==== Results by round ====
Round	1	2	3	4	5	6	8	7^{1}	9	10	11	12	14	15	16	13^{2}	17	19	20	21	22	23	24	25	26	28	29	30	31	18^{3}	32	34	35	36	27^{4}	37	38	39	41	42	33^{5}	44	43^{7}	45	40^{6}	46
Ground	A	H	A	A	H	A	H	H	A	H	A	H	H	A	A	A	H	H	A	H	A	A	H	H	A	A	H	A	H	A	A	H	A	H	H	A	H	H	H	A	H	A	H	A	A	H
Result	W	W	W	L	L	L	D	W	D	W	D	W	D	W	W	L	W	W	D	W	W	W	D	D	W	W	W	D	L	L	L	L	W	W	W	W	W	L	L	W	W	L	W	W	L	D
Position	7	4	2	3	10	13	12	8	8	5	6	4	5	5	4	4	4	5	5	4	2	2	2	3	3	2	2	3	4	4	5	5	5	5	5	4	4	4	4	4	4	4	4	4	4	4

Updated to match(es) played on 13 May 2024. Source: Soccerway
A = Away; H = Home; W = Win; D = Draw; L = Loss; P = Postponed
Notes:
- ^{1} Matchday 7 (vs Cheltenham Town) was postponed due to the international call-ups.
- ^{2} Matchday 13 (vs Wigan Athletic) was postponed due to the international call-ups.
- ^{3} Matchday 18 (vs Exeter City) was postponed due to the international call-ups.
- ^{4} Matchday 27 (vs Northampton Town) was postponed due to progression in the FA Cup.
- ^{5} Matchday 33 (vs Port Vale) was postponed due to a waterlogged pitch.
- ^{6} Matchday 40 (vs Cheltenham Town) was postponed due to the international call-ups.
- ^{7} Matchday 43 (vs Fleetwood Town) was postponed due to the 2024 EFL Trophy final.

==== Matches ====
On 22 June, the EFL League One fixtures were released.

Win Draw Loss Fixtures

5 August 2023 1	Reading	0–1	Peterborough United	Reading
15:00 BST	Azeez (yellow card) 22'; Hutchinson (yellow card) 23'; Yiadom (yellow card) 38'; Savage (yellow card) 52'; Guinness-Walker (yellow card) 65'; Holmes (yellow card) 73'	Report	Kioso (yellow card) 8'; Mason-Clark 43'; Edwards (yellow card) 66'; Kyprianou (yellow card) 86'; Jones (yellow card) 90+9'	Stadium: Select Car Leasing Stadium; Referee: Simon Mather

12 August 2023 2	Peterborough United	1–0	Charlton Athletic	Peterborough
15:00 BST	Collins (yellow card) 27'; Burrows (yellow card) 32'; Kyprianou 45+1'; Randall (yellow card) 52'; Clarke-Harris (yellow card) 87'; Bilokapic (yellow card) 90+7'	Report	Dobson (yellow card) 13'; May (yellow card) 25'; Payne (yellow card) 27'; Jones (yellow card) 31'; Edun (yellow card) 90+1'	Stadium: Weston Homes Stadium; Attendance: 9,100; Referee: Lee Swabey

15 August 2023 3	Barnsley	1–3	Peterborough United	Barnsley
19:45 BST	Cotter 51'	Report	Kyprianou (yellow card) 44' (goal) 74'; Clarke-Harris 76'; Poku 85'	Stadium: Oakwell; Attendance: 11,789; Referee: Anthony Backhouse

19 August 2023 4	Northampton Town	1–0	Peterborough United	Northampton
15:00 BST	Pinnock 90'; Hoskins (yellow card) 90+2'	Report	Collins (yellow card) 17'; Kioso (yellow card) 82'	Stadium: Sixfields Stadium; Attendance: 7,684; Referee: Martin Woods

26 August 2023 5	Peterborough United	2–4	Derby County	Peterborough
15:00 BST	Clarke-Harris 23'; Burrows (yellow card) 39'; Kioso (yellow card) 67'; Poku 90'	Report	Waghorn 29', 40', 45'; Cashin 37'; Forsyth (yellow card) 86'	Stadium: Weston Homes Stadium; Attendance: 11,733; Referee: Lewis Smith

2 September 2023 6	Portsmouth	3–1	Peterborough United	Milton
15:00 BST	Poole (yellow card) 15' (goal) 59'; Bishop 38'; Kamara 43'; Morrell (yellow card) 63' (yellow-red card) 85'	Report	Jones 20'; Mason-Clark (yellow card) 30'; Sturge (yellow card) 81'; Kyrpianou (yellow card) 88'	Stadium: Fratton Park; Attendance: 17,814; Referee: David Rock

16 September 2023 8	Peterborough United	1–1	Leyton Orient	Peterborough
15:00 BST	Kioso (yellow card) 6'; Kyprianou 21', (yellow card) 84'	Report	Beckles 33'; Pratley (yellow card) 43'; Graham (yellow card) 86'; El Mizouni (yellow card) 89'	Stadium: Weston Homes Stadium; Attendance: 7,945; Referee: Scott Tallis

19 September 2023 7	Peterborough United	3–0	Cheltenham Town	Peterborough
19:45 BST	Burrows 54'; Clarke-Harris 61'; Kioso 90+4'	Report	Olayinka (red card) 5'; Butler-Oyedeji (yellow card) 87' (yellow-red card) 88'	Stadium: Weston Homes Stadium; Attendance: 5,845; Referee: Scott Oldham
Note: Fixture was previous postponed due to international call-ups.

23 September 2023 9	Bolton Wanderers	1–1	Peterborough United	Horwich
15:00 BST	Iredale (yellow card) 4'; Dacres-Cogley (yellow card) 39'; Adeboyejo 43'; Jones (red card) 45+2'; Dempsey (yellow card) 47'; Thomason (yellow card) 81'	Report	Kioso (yellow card) 39'; Clarke-Harris 42'; Collins (yellow card) 90+4'	Stadium: Toughsheet Community Stadium; Attendance: 21,318; Referee: Ross Joyce

30 September 2023 10	Peterborough United	2–0	Bristol Rovers	Peterborough
15:00 BST	Collins (yellow card) 15' (goal) 26'; Jones (yellow card) 32'; Ajiboye 47' (yellow card) 77'; Knight (yellow card) 54'; Kyprianou (yellow card) 62'	Report	Evans (yellow card) 56'; Taylor (yellow card) 74'	Stadium: Weston Homes Stadium; Attendance: 9,044; Referee: Ben Toner

3 October 2023 11	Carlisle United	1–1	Peterborough United	Carlisle
19:45 BST	Back (yellow card) 76'; Moxon (yellow card) 90+3'; Gibson 90+6'	Report	Edwards 72'	Stadium: Brunton Park; Attendance: 6,014; Referee: Scott Simpson

7 October 2023 12	Peterborough United	2–0	Lincoln City	Peterborough
15:00 BST	Ajiboye 52' (yellow card) 90+3'; Randall 83'	Report	Roughan (yellow card) 45'; Mandroiu (yellow card) 57'	Stadium: Weston Homes Stadium; Attendance: 9,130; Referee: Sunny Singh Gill

21 October 2023 14	Peterborough United	2–2	Wycombe Wanderers	Peterborough
15:00 BST	Randall 40'; Mason-Clark 45+1'; Knight (yellow card) 87'	Report	Hanlan 35'; Mason-Clark 61' (o.g.)	Stadium: Weston Homes Stadium; Attendance: 8,665; Referee: Andrew Kitchen

24 October 2023 15	Port Vale	0–1	Peterborough United	Burslem
19:45 BST	Garrity (yellow card) 32'	Report	Mason-Clark 14'; Collins (yellow card) 24'; Poku (yellow card) 55'; Kioso (yellow card) 73'; Kyprianou (yellow card) 79'; Crichlow (yellow card) 90+8'	Stadium: Vale Park; Referee: Marc Edwards

28 October 2023 16	Blackpool	2–4	Peterborough United	Blackpool
15:00 BST	Husband (yellow card) 35'; Casey (red card) 46'; Dougall (yellow card) 57' (goal) 60'; Carey 64'		Poku 16'; Mason-Clark (penalty missed) 37' 90+2'; Burrows (yellow card) 45+5' (goal) 47'; Jones 58'; Knight (yellow card) 61'; Katongo (yellow card) 75'	Stadium: Bloomfield Road; Attendance: 10,864; Referee: Ben Atkinson

7 November 2023 13	Wigan Athletic	2–1	Peterborough United	Wigan
19:45 GMT	Godo 7' (yellow card) 67'; Lang (yellow card) 49'; Sessegnon (yellow card) 69'; McManaman 82'	Report	Kyprianou (yellow card) 15'; Poku 54'; Katongo (yellow card) 69'	Stadium: DW Stadium; Referee: Ollie Yates
Note: Fixture was previously postponed due to international call-ups.

11 November 2023 17	Peterborough United	5–0	Cambridge United	Peterborough
12:00 GMT	Mason-Clark 34', 37'; Poku 40', 54'; Bennett 86' (o.g.)	Report		Stadium: Weston Homes Stadium; Attendance: 11,641; Referee: Scott Oldham

25 November 2023 19	Peterborough United	4–0	Burton Albion	Peterborough
15:00 GMT	Randall 6'; Mason-Clark 44'; Jones (yellow card) 52'; Stockton 61' (o.g.); Poku 66'	Report	Helm (yellow card) 9'; Oshilaja (yellow card) 37'; Stockton (yellow card) 54'	Stadium: Weston Homes Stadium; Referee: Alan Young

28 November 2023 20	Stevenage	2–2	Peterborough United	Stevenage
19:45 GMT	James-Wildin 22'; Thompson 30'; Piergianni (yellow card) 34'; Ashby-Hammond (yellow card) 66'	Report	Randall 51'; Jones 81'	Stadium: The Lamex Stadium; Attendance: 5,041; Referee: Sunny Gill

9 December 2023 21	Peterborough United	3–0	Oxford United	Peterborough
15:00 GMT	Kyprianou 24'; Jones 34'; Kioso (yellow card) 60'; de Havilland 90+2'	Report	Bodin (yellow card) 63'	Stadium: Weston Homes Stadium; Attendance: 7,921; Referee: James Linington

16 December 2023 22	Fleetwood Town	0–1	Peterborough United	Fleetwood
15:00 GMT	Vela (yellow card) 13'; Lawal (yellow card) 55'		Collins 42'	Stadium: Highbury Stadium; Attendance: 2,973; Referee: Will Finnie

23 December 2023 23	Shrewsbury Town	1–2	Peterborough United	Shrewsbury
15:00 GMT	Bowman (yellow card) 53'; Shipley 58' (yellow card) 76'; Benning (yellow card) 87'	Report	Mason-Clark (yellow card) 53'; Jones 64'; Kyprianou 77'	Stadium: The Croud Meadow; Attendance: 6,093; Referee: Martin Coy

26 December 2023 24	Peterborough United	2–2	Reading	Peterborough
15:00 GMT	Knight 39'; Mason-Clark 69' (yellow card) 76'	Report	Mbengue (yellow card) 56'; Smith 63', (yellow card) 90'; Azeez 85'; Knibbs (yellow card) 90+2'	Stadium: Weston Homes Stadium; Attendance: 10,444; Referee: David Rock

29 December 2023 25	Peterborough United	2–2	Barnsley	Peterborough
19:45 GMT	Clarke-Harris 45+2', 48'	Report	Kane 10'; Cole 31'; Connell (yellow card) 87'	Stadium: Weston Homes Stadium; Attendance: 10,686; Referee: Adam Herczeg

1 January 2024 26	Derby County	2–3	Peterborough United	Derby
15:00 GMT	Collins 1', (penalty missed) 60', 60'; Forsyth (yellow card) 41'	Report	Burrows 9'; Kyprianou (yellow card) 30'; Poku 84'; Jones 90+4'	Stadium: Pride Park Stadium; Attendance: 29,917; Referee: Ross Joyce

13 January 2024 28	Charlton Athletic	1–2	Peterborough United	Charlton
15:00 GMT	May 49'	Report	Mason-Clark 28', 75'	Stadium: The Valley; Attendance: 13,309; Referee: Sam Purkiss

20 January 2024 29	Peterborough United	2–1	Shrewsbury Town	Peterborough
15:00 GMT	Edwards (yellow card) 30'; Randall 51'; Knight 68'; Collins (yellow card) 78'	Report	Winchester (yellow card) 33'; Shipley 41' (yellow card) 65'; Dunkley (yellow card) 77'	Stadium: Weston Homes Stadium; Attendance: 9,026; Referee: Matt Corlett

27 January 2024 30	Lincoln City	0–0	Peterborough United	Lincoln
15:00 GMT	Hackett-Fairchild (yellow card) 21'	Report	Burrows (yellow card) 90+4'	Stadium: LNER Stadium; Referee: Christopher Pollard

3 February 2024 31	Peterborough United	2–3	Wigan Athletic	Peterborough
15:00 GMT	Kyprianou (yellow card) 54'; Ajiboye (yellow card) 78'; Knight 90+1'; Jones 90+4'	Report	Aasgaard 20', 85' (yellow card) 71'; Hughes (yellow card) 24'; Magennis (yellow card) 28' (goal) 52'; Jones (yellow card) 28'; Clare (yellow card) 57'; Smith (yellow card) 66' (yellow-red card) 76'	Stadium: Weston Homes Stadium; Attendance: 8,184; Referee: Daniel Middleton

6 February 2024 18	Exeter City	2–1	Peterborough United	Exeter
15:00 GMT	Niskanen (yellow card) 9'; Cole 75'; Katongo 80' (o.g.)	Report	Burrows 32' (pen.); Olakigbe (yellow card) 36' (yellow-red card) 55'; Knight (yellow card) 90+5'	Stadium: St James Park; Attendance: 5,277; Referee: Tom Reeves
Note: Fixture was initially scheduled for 18 November, but was postponed due to international call-ups.

10 February 2024 32	Wycombe Wanderers	5–2	Peterborough United	High Wycombe
15:00 GMT	Potts (yellow card) 26'; Vincent-Young 38'; Grimmer 45+11'; Sadlier 57'; Vokes 74'; Wheeler 90+2'; Lubala (yellow card) 90+9'	Report	Ajiboye 66'; Jones 69'; Aderoju (yellow card) 89'	Stadium: Adams Park; Attendance: 4,800; Referee: Ollie Yates

17 February 2024 34	Peterborough United	1–2	Blackpool	Peterborough
15:00 GMT	Kyprianou 39'; Randall (yellow card) 45'	Report	Lavery 56' (pen.), (yellow card) 76'; Norburn (yellow card) 62'; Virtue (yellow card) 86'; Dembélé 90+1'; Lawrence-Gabriel (yellow card) 90+6'	Stadium: Weston Homes Stadium; Attendance: 8,293; Referee: Dean Whitestone

24 February 2024 35	Cambridge United	0–1	Peterborough United	Cambridge
12:00 GMT	Lankester (yellow card) 17'; Morrison (yellow card) 58'; Bennett (yellow card) 65'; Andrew (yellow card) 79'	Report	Mason-Clark 55'; Knight (yellow card) 70'; Katongo (yellow card) 90+4'	Stadium: Abbey Stadium; Attendance: 7,710; Referee: Charles Breakspear

2 March 2024 36	Peterborough United	2–1	Exeter City	Peterborough
15:00 GMT	Mason-Clark 4'; Poku 68'	Report	Carroll 36'; Harper (yellow card) 39'; Purrington (yellow card) 62'; Harris (yellow card) 84'; Rankine (yellow card) 85'; Niskanen (yellow card) 90+10'	Stadium: Weston Homes Stadium; Attendance: 7,496; Referee: Tom Reeves

5 March 2024 27	Peterborough United	5–1	Northampton Town	Peterborough
19:45 GMT	Mason-Clark 25'; Poku 28'; Randall 45'; Kyprianou 59'; Knight 64'; Mothersille (yellow card) 75'	Report	Guthrie 9'; Bowie (yellow card) 39'	Stadium: Weston Homes Stadium; Attendance: 9,028; Referee: Craig Hicks
Note: Fixture was originally scheduled for 6 January, but was postponed due to the clubs progression in the FA Cup.

9 March 2024 37	Burton Albion	1–3	Peterborough United	Burton upon Trent
15:00 GMT	Oshilaja (yellow card) 46'; Ola-Adebomi 70'; Hamer (yellow card) 87'	Report	Jones 56'; Katongo (yellow card) 61'; Knight 88'; Clarke-Harris 90+6'	Stadium: Pirelli Stadium; Attendance: 3,641; Referee: Ross Joyce

13 March 2024 38	Peterborough United	3–1	Stevenage	Peterborough
20:00 GMT	Kyprianou (yellow card) 33'; Burrows 44' (pen.); Katongo 64'; Poku 77'		Freeman 85'	Stadium: Weston Homes Stadium; Attendance: 7,504; Referee: Carl Brook
Note: Fixture was initially scheduled for 12 March, but was moved for live Sky Sports broadcast.

16 March 2024 39	Peterborough United	0–1	Portsmouth	Peterborough
15:00 GMT	Poku (yellow card) 75'	Report	Sparkes (yellow card) 75'; Yengi 77'; Pack (yellow card) 78'	Stadium: Weston Homes Stadium; Attendance: 12,744; Referee: Alex Chilowicz

29 March 2024 41	Peterborough United	1–3	Carlisle United	Peterborough
15:00 GMT	Randall 61'	Report	Ellis (yellow card) 7'; Mellish 27', (yellow card) 33', (goal) 49', 58'	Stadium: Weston Homes Stadium; Attendance: 10,080; Referee: Will Finnie

1 April 2024 42	Leyton Orient	1–2	Peterborough United	Leyton
15:00 BST	Galbraith 66'; Sotiriou (yellow card) 71'	Report	Kyprianou 8'; Mason-Clark 26'	Stadium: Gaughan Group Stadium; Referee: Sunny Sukhvir Gill

10 April 2024 33	Peterborough United	3–0	Port Vale	Peterborough
19:45 GMT	Knight (yellow card) 45'; Randall 45+2'; Burrows 56' (pen.); Iacovitti 86' (o.g.)		Ojo (yellow card) 7'; Lowe (yellow card) 77'; Ikpeazu (yellow card) 85'	Stadium: Weston Homes Stadium; Attendance: 7,770; Referee: Stephen Martin
Note: Fixture was originally scheduled for 13 February, but was postponed due to a waterlogged pitch.

13 April 2024 44	Oxford United	5–0	Peterborough United	Oxford
15:00 BST	Harris 19' (pen.); Murphy 31'; Rodrigues 38', 58'; Bodin 89'	Report	Katongo (yellow card) 18'	Stadium: The Kassam Stadium; Attendance: 10,046; Referee: Andy Davies

16 April 2024 43	Peterborough United	4–1	Fleetwood Town	Peterborough
19:45 BST	Mothersille 17'; Collins 80'; Clarke-Harris 90+5' 90+6'		Lawal 1' (penalty missed); Omochere (penalty missed)	Stadium: Weston Homes Stadium; Referee: Seb Stockbridge
Note: Fixture was initially scheduled for 6 April, but was rescheduled due to the 2024 EFL Trophy final.

20 April 2024 45	Bristol Rovers	0–2	Peterborough United	Horfield
15:00 BST	Thomas (yellow card) 45+2'; Hoole (yellow card) 69'		Randall 41'; Knight (yellow card) 90'; Jones 90+5'	Stadium: Memorial Stadium; Attendance: 8,714; Referee: Tom Reeves

23 April 2024 40	Cheltenham Town	2–0	Peterborough United	Cheltenham
19:45 BST	Nuttall 11'; Taylor 21', (yellow card) 74'	Report		Stadium: Completely-Suzuki Stadium; Attendance: 3,873; Referee: Edward Duckworth
Note: Fixture was originally scheduled for 23 March, but was postponed due to international call-ups.

27 April 2024 46	Peterborough United	3–3	Bolton Wanderers	Peterborough
15:00 BST	Mothersille 50' 79'; Randall 41'	Report	Dempsey 4'; Charles 8' (pen.); Jerome 82'	Stadium: Weston Homes Stadium; Attendance: 11,643; Referee: Bobby Madley

==== Play-offs ====
Peterborough United finished fourth in the regular 2023–24 EFL League One season, so are drawn against fifth-placed Oxford United in the play-off semi-final. The first leg will take place at the Kassam Stadium and the second leg took place at the Weston Homes Stadium.

4 May 2024 Semi-Final, First leg	Oxford United	1–0	Peterborough United	Oxford
19:45 BST	Rodrigues (yellow card) 30'; Bennett (yellow card) 44'; Moore 53'	Report	Mason-Clarke (yellow card) 77'; Katongo (yellow card) 90+3'	Stadium: Kassam Stadium; Attendance: 11,125; Referee: Lewis Smith

8 May 2024 Semi-Final, Second leg	Peterborough United	1–1 (1–2 agg.)	Oxford United	Peterborough
20:00 BST	Knight 41'	Report	Brannagan 45+3' (pen.)	Stadium: London Road Stadium; Attendance: 12,420; Referee: Andrew Kitchen

=== FA Cup ===
The Posh were drawn at home to Salford City in the first round, Doncaster Rovers in the second round and Leeds United in the third round.

Win Draw Loss Fixtures

4 November 2023 First round	Peterborough United	2–2	Salford City	Peterborough
15:00 GMT	Katongo (yellow card) 7'; Jones 47'; Fernandez 90+3'	Report	Mallan 5'; Garbutt (yellow card) 36'; Sturge 69' (o.g.); N'Mai (yellow card) 81'	Stadium: Weston Homes Stadium; Attendance: 4,066; Referee: Sam Purkiss

14 November 2023 First round replay	Salford City	4–4 (a.e.t.) (4–5 p)	Peterborough United	Kersal
19:45 GMT	Tilt 4', 54'; Knight 61' (o.g.); Garbutt (yellow card) 90+5'; Mallan 104'	Report	Randall 16'; Mason-Clark 18'; Collins 45+1' (yellow card) 59'; Crichlow (yellow card) 82'; Clarke-Harris 120+3'	Stadium: The Peninsula Stadium; Attendance: 1,030; Referee: Darren Drysdale
	Penalties
	Watson (penalty scored); Mallan (penalty scored); Dackers (penalty missed); Garbutt (penalty scored); Watt (penalty missed); Lund (penalty scored); McLennan (penalty missed)		Clarke-Harris (penalty scored); Poku (penalty scored); Mason-Clark (penalty missed); Wakeling (penalty missed); Ajiboye (penalty scored); Dornelly (penalty scored); Collins (penalty scored)

2 December 2023 Second round	Peterborough United	2–1	Doncaster Rovers	Peterborough
15:00 GMT	Burrows 3'; Mason-Clark 53'	Report	Anderson (yellow card) 33'; Olowu (yellow card) 42'; Maxwell (yellow card) 59'; Faal 75'	Stadium: Weston Homes Stadium; Attendance: 5,495; Referee: Ben Speedie

7 January 2024 Third round	Peterborough United	0–3	Leeds United	Peterborough
14:00 GMT	Knight (yellow card) 35'	Report	Ampadu 34', 90', (yellow card) 67'; Gnonto (yellow card) 39'; Bamford 47'	Stadium: Weston Homes Stadium; Referee: Sam Allison

=== EFL Cup ===
Peterborough were drawn against Swindon Town at home in the first round then away to Portsmouth in the second round and Mansfield Town in the third round.

Win Draw Loss Fixtures

8 August 2023 First round	Peterborough United	1–1 (4–1 p)	Swindon Town	Peterborough
19:30 BST	Randall 7'; Kyprianou (yellow card) 41'	Report	Blake-Tracy (yellow card) 45+2'; Hepburn-Murphy 49'	Stadium: Weston Homes Stadium; Attendance: 3,440; Referee: Tom Nield
	Penalties
	Clarke-Harris (penalty scored); Edwards (penalty scored); Tomlinson (penalty scored); Burrows (penalty scored)		Blake-Tracy (penalty missed); Kemp (penalty scored); Young (penalty missed)

29 August 2023 Second round	Portsmouth	1–1 (4–5 p)	Peterborough United	Milton
19:45 BST	Saydee 51'; Robertson (yellow card) 39'; Stevenson (yellow card) 53'		Ajiboye 29'; Fernandez (yellow card) 44'; O'Connell (yellow card) 40' (yellow-red card) 59'	Stadium: Fratton Park; Attendance: 6,594; Referee: Charles Breakspear
	Penalties
	Bishop (penalty scored); Raggett (penalty scored); Pack (penalty scored); Saydee (penalty scored); Kamara (penalty missed); Morrell (penalty missed)		Knight (penalty scored); De Havilland (penalty missed); Tomlinson (penalty scored); Jones (penalty scored); Corbett (penalty scored); Ajiboye (penalty scored)

26 September 2023 Third round	Mansfield Town	2–2 (3–1 p)	Peterborough United	Mansfield
19:45 BST	Swan 5' (pen.); Reed (yellow card) 29'; Flint (yellow card) 87'; Akins 90+3' (pen.)	Report	Collins (yellow card) 4'; Clarke-Harris 30', 47'; Burrows (yellow card) 68'; Mason-Clark (yellow card) 87'	Stadium: One Call Stadium; Attendance: 4,372; Referee: Seb Stockbridge
	Penalties
	Akins (penalty scored); Bowery (penalty scored); Flint (penalty missed); Clarke (penalty missed); Keillor-Dunn (penalty scored)		Clarke-Harris (penalty missed); Edwards (penalty missed); Mason-Clark (penalty scored); Knight (penalty missed)

=== EFL Trophy ===
In the group stage, Peterborough were drawn into Southern Group D alongside Cambridge United, Colchester United and Tottenham Hotspur U21. After topping the group, Peterborough United were drawn at home against Arsenal U21 in the second round and Crawley Town in the third round. They were then drawn at home to AFC Wimbledon in the Quarter Finals and away to Blackpool in the Semi Finals. Peterborough Beat Blackpool 3-0 and will face Wycombe Wanderers at Wembley Stadium. On 7 April 2024, Peterborough United won their second EFL Trophy beating Wycombe Wanderers 2–1 in the final.

Pos	Div	Team	Pld	W	PW	PL	L	GF	GA	GD	Pts	Qualification
1	L1	Peterborough United	3	2	0	0	1	5	2	+3	6	Advance to Round 2
2	L2	Colchester United	3	2	0	0	1	3	6	−3	6	Advance to Round 2
3	ACA	Tottenham Hotspur U21	3	1	0	0	2	7	7	0	3	
4	L1	Cambridge United	3	1	0	0	2	5	5	0	3	

Updated to match(es) played on 7 November 2023. Source: EFL.com

Win Draw Loss Fixtures

5 September 2023 Group stage	Peterborough United	2–0	Cambridge United	Peterborough
19:00 BST	Katongo 19'; Burrows (yellow card) 51'; Mason-Clark 54'	Report	Kachunga (yellow card) 61'; McConnell (yellow card) 90'	Stadium: Weston Homes Stadium; Attendance: 3,687; Referee: Kirsty Dowle

31 October 2023 Group stage	Peterborough United	3–1	Tottenham Hotspur U21	Peterborough
19:00 GMT	Fernandez 31'; Jones 53'; Poku 69'		Véliz 24'	Stadium: Weston Homes Stadium; Attendance: 2,094; Referee: Carl Brook

21 November 2023 Group stage	Colchester United	1–0	Peterborough United	Colchester
19:30 GMT	Ihionvien 42'; Kennedy (yellow card) 75'	Report	Crichlow (yellow card) 64'; Van Lier (yellow card) 78'	Stadium: JobServe Community Stadium; Attendance: 802; Referee: Craig Hicks

5 December 2023 Second round	Peterborough United	3–0	Arsenal U21	Peterborough
19:30 GMT	De Havilland 36'; Clarke-Harris 39' (yellow card) 60'; Collins (yellow card) 43'; Mothersille 49' (yellow card) 72'		Monlouis (yellow card) 9'; Edwards (penalty missed) 53	Stadium: Weston Homes Stadium; Attendance: 2,151; Referee: Lee Swabey

23 January 2024 Third round	Peterborough United	2–1	Crawley Town	Peterborough
19:30 GMT	Burrows 28' (yellow card) 83'; Mason-Clark 37'		Kelly (yellow card) 5'; Tsaroulla 23'; Lolos (yellow card) 88'	Stadium: Weston Homes Stadium; Referee: Simon Mather
Note: Fixture was originally scheduled for 10 January, but was postponed due to a frozen pitch.

30 January 2024 Quarter-final	Peterborough United	3–1	AFC Wimbledon	Peterborough
19:30 GMT	Mothersille 2'; Mason-Clark 4'; Knight (yellow card) 83'; Jones 90+5'	Report	Ball (yellow card) 10'; McLean 89'	Stadium: Weston Homes Stadium; Attendance: 3,225; Referee: Carl Brook

20 February 2024 Semi Finals	Blackpool	0–3	Peterborough United	Blackpool
20:00 GMT	Connolly (yellow card) 51'; O'Donnell (yellow card) 79'		Mothersille 37'; Fuchs (yellow card) 67'; Burrows 80' (pen.) 90+3'	Stadium: Bloomfield Road; Attendance: 6,044; Referee: Lewis Smith

==== Final ====
7 April 2024
16:30 BST

Peterborough United	2–1	Wycombe Wanderers
Collins (yellow card) 81'; Burrows 85', 90+1' (yellow card) 90+8'		Taylor 89'; Forino (yellow card) 90+8'

Wembley Stadium, London
Attendance: 42,252
Referee: Scott Oldham
