= Kai Corbett =

Spanish footballer born to English parents (born 2002)

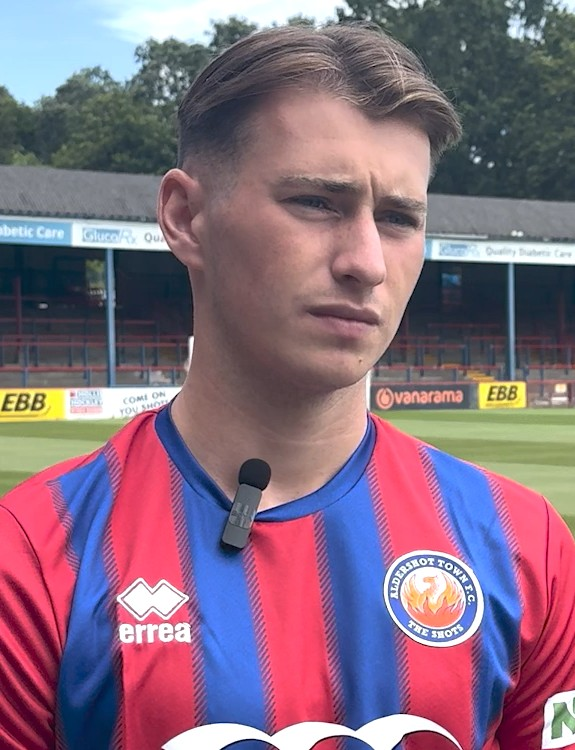
- Corbett in July 2024

Personal information
- Full name: Kai Michael James Corbett
- Date of birth: 8 October 2002 (age 24)
- Place of birth: Barcelona, Spain
- Height: 1.82 m (6 ft 0 in)
- Position: Winger

Team information
- Current team: Eastbourne Borough
- Number: 7

Youth career
- Barcelona
- Chelsea
- Southampton
- Arsenal
- Reading
- 2014–2021: West Ham United

Senior career*
Years	Team	Apps	(Gls)
2021–2024	Peterborough United	1	(0)
2024	→ Scunthorpe United (loan)	5	(1)
2024–2025	Aldershot Town	34	(1)
2025	Chelmsford City	11	(1)
2025–	Eastbourne Borough	45	(15)
- * Club domestic league appearances and goals as of 22:39, 21 November 2026 (UTC)

Kai Michael James Corbett (born 7 October 2002) is a Spanish professional footballer, born to English parents, who plays as a winger for Isthmian League Premier Division club Eastbourne Borough.

== Career ==
Corbett was born in Barcelona, Spain to English parents, before moving to England as a child. Prior to moving to England, Corbett was in the youth academy at Barcelona. Corbett joined Arsenal at under-9 level, after playing for Chelsea and Southampton. Corbett later represented Reading before signing for West Ham United in 2014. In early 2020, Corbett had a trial at Manchester United, scoring in a 1–0 win against Blackburn Rovers' under-18's, however Corbett did not gain a contract at Manchester United due to a dispute in his compensation fee.

=== Peterborough United ===
Following trials with Wolverhampton Wanderers and former club Southampton at the start the 2021–22 Premier League 2 season, Corbett signed for EFL Championship club Peterborough United on 15 November 2021. On 27 November 2021, Corbett made his debut for Peterborough, starting in a 0–0 draw against Barnsley.

In March 2024, Corbett joined National League North side Scunthorpe United on loan, until the end of the 2023–24 season.

On 12 May 2024, Peterborough announced the player had been transfer-listed.

=== Aldershot Town ===
On 4 July 2024, Corbett signed for National League side Aldershot Town for an undisclosed fee, signing a one-year deal. He departed the club at the end of the 2024–25 season.

=== Chelmsford City ===
On 11 July 2025, Corbett agreed to join National League South club Chelmsford City, following his release from Aldershot.

=== Eastbourne Borough ===
On 31 October 2025, Corbett joined fellow National League South side Eastbourne Borough, reuniting with former Aldershot Town manager Tommy Widdrington.

Corbett scored his first hat-trick for Borough in the Isthmian Premier during a 3-2 win over Brentwood Town on 15 August 2026.

== Career statistics ==
As of 21 November 2026

Appearances and goals by club, season and competition
Club	Season	League			FA Cup		EFL Cup		Other		Total	
Club	Season	Division	Apps	Goals	Apps	Goals	Apps	Goals	Apps	Goals	Apps	Goals
West Ham United U21	2019–20	—	—		—		—		2 (Note: Appearance(s) in EFL Trophy)	1	2	1
West Ham United U21	2020–21	—	—		—		—		2	1	2	1
West Ham United U21	Total		—		—		—		4	2	4	2
Peterborough United	2021–22	EFL Championship	1	0	0	0	0	0	—		1	0
Peterborough United	2022–23	League One	0	0	0	0	0	0	0	0	0	0
Peterborough United	2023–24	League One	0	0	0	0	1	0	2	0	3	0
Peterborough United	Total		1	0	0	0	1	0	2	0	4	0
Scunthorpe United (loan)	2023–24	National League North	5	1	0	0	—		0	0	5	1
Aldershot Town	2024–25	National League	34	1	1	0	—		10 (Note: Six appearances and four goals in FA Trophy, four appearances and one goal in National League Cup)	5	45	6
Chelmsford City	2025–26	National League South	11	1	2	1	—		1 (Note: Appearance(s) in Essex Senior Cup)	0	14	2
Eastbourne Borough	2025–26	National League South	30	6	0	0	—		3 (Note: One appearance and one goal in FA Trophy, two appearances in Sussex Senior Cup)	1	33	7
Eastbourne Borough	2026–27	IL Premier Division	15	9	4	1	—		2 (Note: Appearance(s) in FA Trophy)	2	21	12
Eastbourne Borough	Total		45	15	4	1	—		5	3	54	19
Career total			96	18	7	2	1	0	22	10	126	30

== Honours ==
Aldershot Town

- FA Trophy: 2024–25
