= Harry Titchmarsh =

English footballer (born 2005)

Personal information
- Full name: Harry Anthony Titchmarsh
- Date of birth: 4 April 2005 (age 21)
- Position: Midfielder

Team information
- Current team: Peterborough United
- Number: 34

Youth career
- 2???–2021: West Ham United
- 2021–2022: Peterborough United

Senior career*
| Years | Team | Apps | (Gls) |
| 2022–2024 | Peterborough United | 1 | (0) |
| 2024– | Hitchin Town | 23 | (2) |
- * Club domestic league appearances and goals as of 17:41, 17 January 2025 (UTC)

Harry Anthony Titchmarsh (born 4 April 2005) is an English professional footballer who plays as a midfielder for Southern League Premier Division Central club Hitchin Town.

== Career ==
Titchmarsh made his first involvement in senior football when he was named in the Peterborough United matchday squad for the EFL Trophy fixture with Stevenage on 30 August 2022, and he signed a professional development contract shortly afterwards. He made his first-team debut in the EFL Cup on 29 August 2023, in a 1–1 draw at Portsmouth, when he came on as an 83rd-minute substitute for Kabongo Tshimanga.

On 12 May 2024, the club announced he would be released in the summer when his contract expired.

In August 2024, Titchmarsh joined Hitchin Town following his contract expiration.

== Style of play ==
The Peterborough United club website described Titchmarsh as "a technically and tactically sound central midfielder". Hitchin Town have described him as a "hard-working combative midfielder who likes to get on the ball".

== Career statistics ==
As of match played 14 January 2025

Appearances and goals by club, season and competition
| Club | Season | League | | | FA Cup | | EFL Cup | | Other | | Total | |
| Club | Season | Division | Apps | Goals | Apps | Goals | Apps | Goals | Apps | Goals | Apps | Goals |
|---|---|---|---|---|---|---|---|---|---|---|---|---|
| Peterborough United | 2022–23 | EFL League One | 0 | 0 | 0 | 0 | 0 | 0 | 0 | 0 | 0 | 0 |
| Peterborough United | 2023–24 | EFL League One | 0 | 0 | 0 | 0 | 1 | 0 | 0 | 0 | 1 | 0 |
| Peterborough United | Total | | 0 | 0 | 0 | 0 | 1 | 0 | 0 | 0 | 1 | 0 |
| Hitchin Town | 2024–25 | Southern League Premier Division Central | 23 | 2 | 1 | 0 | – | | 4 (Note: 1 appearance in Herts Charity Cup, 1 appearance in FA Trophy, 2 appearances in Herts Senior Cup) | 0 | 28 | 2 |
| Career total | | | 23 | 2 | 1 | 0 | 1 | 0 | 4 | 0 | 29 | 2 |
