= David Ajiboye =

English footballer (born 1998)

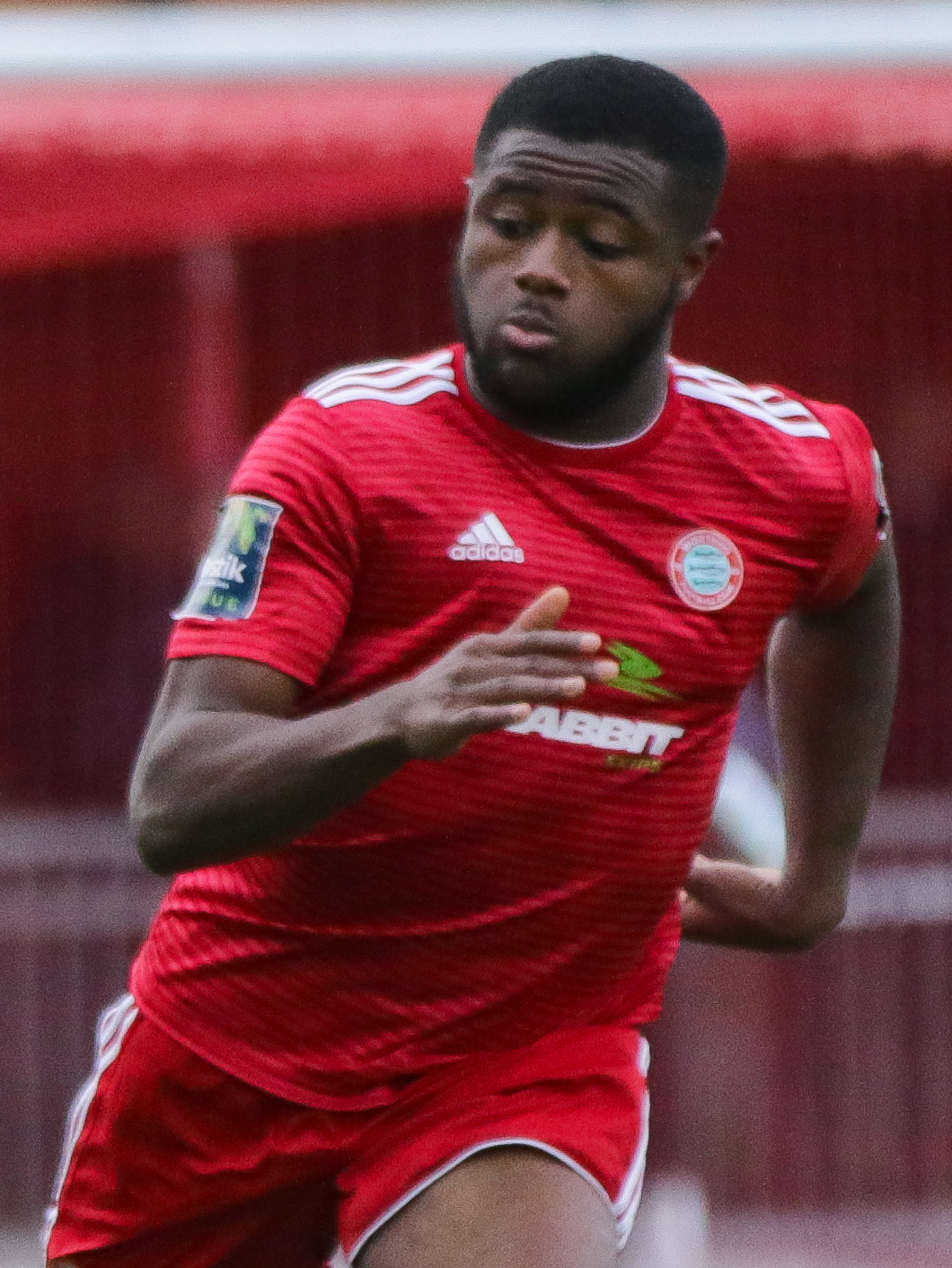
- Ajiboye playing for Worthing in January 2019

Personal information
- Full name: David Ibukun Ajiboye
- Date of birth: 28 September 1998 (age 28)
- Place of birth: Bromley, England
- Height: 5 ft 8 in (1.72 m)
- Positions: Winger; striker

Team information
- Current team: Carlisle United
- Number: 7

Youth career
- 2015–2018: Brighton & Hove Albion
- 2018: → Millwall (loan)

Senior career*
| Years | Team | Apps | (Gls) |
| 2017–2018 | Brighton & Hove Albion | 0 | (0) |
| 2017 | → Worthing (loan) | 3 | (0) |
| 2018–2019 | Worthing | 34 | (16) |
| 2019–2022 | Sutton United | 116 | (17) |
| 2022–2025 | Peterborough United | 50 | (3) |
| 2023 | → Sutton United (loan) | 21 | (4) |
| 2024–2025 | → York City (loan) | 7 | (1) |
| 2025 | → Newport County (loan) | 21 | (2) |
| 2025– | Carlisle United | 45 | (11) |
- * Club domestic league appearances and goals as of 19:48, 8 November 2026 (UTC)

David Ibukun Ajiboye (born 28 September 1998) is an English professional footballer who plays as a winger or striker for Carlisle United.

Born in Bromley, Ajiboye joined Brighton & Hove Albion as a scholar in 2015 and had a loan spell with Worthing in 2017. He was released by Brighton in summer 2018 having failed to make an appearance for the club, and joined former loan club Worthing. After a season at Worthing, he joined Sutton United of the National League, and was promoted to EFL League Two with the club in 2021.

== Career ==
=== Early career ===
Born in Bromley, Aljiboye signed for Brighton & Hove Albion on a two-year scholarship in 2015. He had a loan spell at Worthing in the Isthmian League Premier Division in 2017, where he made 3 appearances. He made his EFL Trophy debut for Brighton & Hove Albion U21 on 29 August 2017 in a 2–0 defeat to Milton Keynes Dons. In January 2018, he joined Millwall U23 on loan for the remainder of the season. He was released by Brighton in summer 2018 and signed for former loan club Worthing shortly after. He scored 21 goals in 45 games for Worthing across the 2018–19 season.

=== Sutton United ===
In summer 2019, Ajiboye signed for Sutton United of the National League. He scored 4 goals in 37 league appearances during the 2019–20 campaign, which was ended prematurely due to the COVID-19 pandemic. Sutton United were promoted to EFL League Two as champions of the National League at the end of the 2020–21 season, with Ajiboye having scored 5 times during that league campaign. On 29 June 2021, it was announced that Ajiboye had signed a new contract with the club with his previous contract about to expire. He was named in the National League Team of the Season for the 2020–21 season.

He made his League Two debut on 7 August 2021 in a 2–1 defeat to Forest Green Rovers. He scored his first goal of the season on 28 August 2021 in a 2–1 home defeat to Oldham Athletic.

=== Peterborough United ===
On 22 June 2022, Ajiboye signed for League One club Peterborough United for an undisclosed fee, signing a three-year contract with the club.

On 30 December 2022, Ajiboye was announced to have returned to Sutton United on loan until the end of the 2022–23, a deal becoming active from 1 January.

On 12 May 2024, Peterborough announced the player had been transfer-listed.

On 7 November 2024, Ajiboye joined National League side York City on loan until January 2025.

On 16 January 2025 Ajiboye joined EFL League Two club Newport County on loan for the remainder of the 2024–25 season. He made his Newport debut on 18 January 2025 in the 3-2 EFL League Two defeat to Port Vale. Ajiboye scored his first goal for Newport on 4 February 2025 in the EFL League Two 2–1 win against Morecambe.

Ajiboye was released by Peterborough at the end of the 2024–25 season.

=== Carlisle United ===
In June 2025 it was announced that he would join Carlisle United from 1 July 2025. Ajiboye scored his first goal plus assist for Carlisle on the 31st of January 2026

== Personal life ==
Born in England, Ajiboye is of Nigerian and Jamaican descent.

== Style of play ==
Ajiboye plays as a winger or as a striker.

== Career statistics ==
As of match played 7 November 2026

Appearances and goals by club, season and competition
| Club | Season | League | | | FA Cup | | EFL Cup | | Other | | Total | |
| Club | Season | Division | Apps | Goals | Apps | Goals | Apps | Goals | Apps | Goals | Apps | Goals |
|---|---|---|---|---|---|---|---|---|---|---|---|---|
| Brighton & Hove Albion | 2016–17 | Championship | 0 | 0 | 0 | 0 | 0 | 0 | 0 | 0 | 0 | 0 |
| Brighton & Hove Albion | 2017–18 | Premier League | 0 | 0 | 0 | 0 | 0 | 0 | 0 | 0 | 0 | 0 |
| Brighton & Hove Albion | Total | | 0 | 0 | 0 | 0 | 0 | 0 | 0 | 0 | 0 | 0 |
| Worthing (loan) | 2016–17 | Isthmian League Premier Division | 2 | 0 | 0 | 0 | — | | 0 | 0 | 2 | 0 |
| Brighton & Hove Albion U21 | 2017–18 | — | | | — | | — | | 1 (Note: Appearance(s) in EFL Trophy) | 0 | 1 | 0 |
| Worthing | 2018–19 | Isthmian League Premier Division | 34 | 16 | 4 | 2 | — | | 7 (Note: 4 appearances and 1 goal in FA Trophy, 2 appearances and 1 goal in Alan Turvey Trophy, 1 appearance and 1 goal in Sussex Senior Cup) | 3 | 45 | 21 |
| Sutton United | 2019–20 | National League | 37 | 4 | 2 | 0 | — | | 2 (Note: Appearance(s) in FA Trophy) | 0 | 41 | 4 |
| Sutton United | 2020–21 | National League | 39 | 5 | 1 | 0 | — | | 3 | 0 | 43 | 5 |
| Sutton United | 2021–22 | League Two | 43 | 8 | 2 | 0 | 1 | 0 | 4 | 0 | 50 | 8 |
| Sutton United | Total | | 116 | 17 | 5 | 0 | 1 | 0 | 9 | 0 | 131 | 17 |
| Peterborough United | 2022–23 | League One | 4 | 0 | 2 | 0 | 2 | 0 | 2 | 0 | 10 | 0 |
| Peterborough United | 2023–24 | League One | 40 | 3 | 3 | 0 | 3 | 1 | 9 (Note: Seven appearances in EFL Trophy, two appearances in EFL League One play-offs) | 0 | 55 | 4 |
| Peterborough United | 2024–25 | League One | 6 | 0 | 0 | 0 | 1 | 0 | 1 | 0 | 8 | 0 |
| Peterborough United | Total | | 50 | 3 | 5 | 0 | 6 | 1 | 12 | 0 | 73 | 4 |
| Sutton United (loan) | 2022–23 | League Two | 21 | 4 | 0 | 0 | 0 | 0 | 0 | 0 | 21 | 4 |
| York City (loan) | 2024–25 | National League | 7 | 1 | 0 | 0 | — | | 1 | 1 | 8 | 2 |
| Newport County (loan) | 2024–25 | League Two | 21 | 2 | — | | — | | — | | 21 | 2 |
| Carlisle United | 2025–26 | National League | 29 | 7 | 2 | 0 | — | | 1 | 0 | 31 | 7 |
| Carlisle United | 2026–27 | National League | 16 | 4 | 1 | 1 | — | | 0 | 0 | 17 | 5 |
| Carlisle United | Total | | 45 | 11 | 3 | 1 | — | | 1 | 0 | 48 | 12 |
| Career total | | | 298 | 53 | 15 | 3 | 7 | 1 | 31 | 4 | 353 | 62 |

== Honours ==
Sutton United

- National League: 2020–21
- EFL Trophy runner-up: 2021–22

Peterborough United

- EFL Trophy: 2023–24

Individual

- National League Team of the Year: 2020–21
