= Lucas Bergström =

Finnish footballer (born 2002)

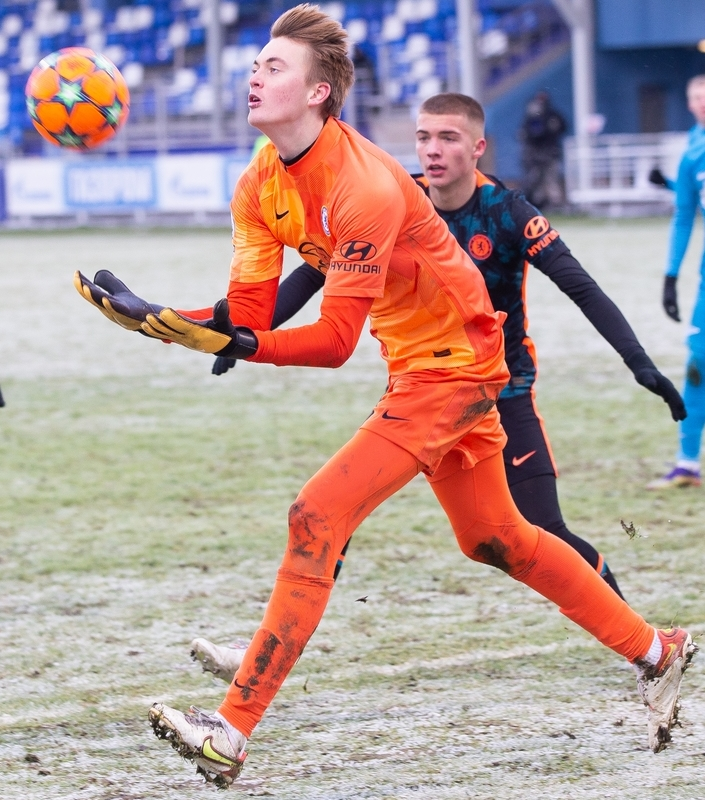
- Bergström in UEFA Youth League in 2021

Personal information
- Full name: Lucas Carl Edvard Bergström
- Date of birth: 5 September 2002 (age 24)
- Place of birth: Pargas, Finland
- Height: 2.05 m (6 ft 9 in)
- Position: Goalkeeper

Team information
- Current team: Mallorca
- Number: 13

Youth career
- 2006–2016: PIF
- 2016–2018: TPS
- 2018–2022: Chelsea

Senior career*
Years	Team	Apps	(Gls)
2022–2025	Chelsea	0	(0)
2022–2023	→ Peterborough United (loan)	21	(0)
2024	→ IF Brommapojkarna (loan)	3	(0)
2025–	Mallorca	5	(0)

International career
2018	Finland U16	2	(0)
2018	Finland U17	4	(0)
2023–2025	Finland U21	19	(0)
2023	Finland	1	(0)
- * Club domestic league appearances and goals as of 5 December 2025

Lucas Carl Edvard Bergström (born 5 September 2002) is a Finnish professional footballer who plays as a goalkeeper for Segunda División club Mallorca.

Bergström began his career with PIF at the age of 4. He made his debut on senior level on 30 July 2022 at the age of 19 in a League One match in the ranks of the Peterborough in a match against Cheltenham. He made his full international debut for Finland in January 2023 at the age of 20 in a match against Sweden.

== Club career ==
=== Chelsea ===
Bergström joined English Premier League side Chelsea from his native side TPS in 2018. He made his youth debut in the final game of 2018–19 season against Reading and turned professional in September 2019. On 14 September 2021, Bergström was named among substitutes for the Champions League group match against Zenit Saint Petersburg at home. In 2023, Bergström travelled to the US as part of the Premier League Summer Series. At the start of the 2023–24 Premier league season, Marcus Bettinelli and Robert Sánchez had received injures allowing Bergström to be named on the bench on multiple occasions.

==== Loan to Peterborough United ====
In July 2022, Bergström was sent on loan to Peterborough United in the League One. On 30 July, He made his professional debut in a 3–2 win in a League One match against Cheltenham Town. Bergström managed 9 clean sheets in 28 matches in all competitions. On 17 January 2023 Peterborough United confirmed that Bergström had been recalled by parent club Chelsea.

==== Loan to IF Brommapojkarna ====
On 29 February 2024, Bergström extended his contract with Chelsea, and immediately thereafter IF Brommapojkarna announced that Bergström would join the team for the duration of the 2024 Allsvenskan season. However, the loan was terminated on 18 June.

==== Back to Chelsea ====
Bergström remained with Chelsea first team for the 2024–25 season. However, he was released at the end of the season without making a single appearance for the team.

=== Mallorca ===
On 15 July 2025, Bergström moved to Spain, and joined La Liga club Mallorca as a free agent, signing a contract until 2027. On 9 November, Bergström kept his first clean sheet in La Liga, in a 1–0 home win against Getafe.

== International career ==
Bergström has represented Finland at under-16 and under-17 levels. He was called up to under-21 squad between 2021 and 2022 ahead of 2023 UEFA European Under-21 Championship qualification.

On 9 January 2023, Bergström made his debut in the Finland national football team starting in a friendly against Sweden, where Sweden won the match 2–0.

Bergström played for the Finland U21 national team through the 2025 UEFA European Under-21 Championship qualification, and was named in the squad for the final tournament in Slovakia in June 2025, playing in all three group stage matches against Netherlands, Ukraine and Denmark.

== Career statistics ==
=== Club ===
As of match played 16 December 2025

Appearances and goals by club, season and competition
Club	Season	League			National cup (Note: Includes FA Cup, Svenska Cupen and Copa del Rey)		League cup (Note: Includes EFL Cup)		Other		Total	
Club	Season	Division	Apps	Goals	Apps	Goals	Apps	Goals	Apps	Goals	Apps	Goals
Chelsea U21	2020–21	—			—		—		2 (Note: Appearances in EFL Trophy)	0	2	0
Chelsea U21	2021–22	—			—		—		1	0	1	0
Chelsea U21	Total		—		—		—		3	0	3	0
Peterborough United (loan)	2022–23	League One	21	0	3	0	1	0	3	0	28	0
IF Brommapojkarna (loan)	2024	Allsvenskan	3	0	1	0	—		—		4	0
Mallorca	2025–26	La Liga	5	0	2	0	—		—		7	0
Career total			29	0	6	0	1	0	6	0	42	0

=== International ===
Appearances and goals by national team and year
National team	Year	Apps	Goals
Finland	2023	1	0
Total		1	0

== Honours ==
Chelsea

- UEFA Conference League: 2024–25
