= Will Blackmore =

English footballer (born 2001)

Personal information
- Full name: William Oliver Blackmore
- Date of birth: 1 October 2001 (age 25)
- Place of birth: Brighton, England
- Height: 6 ft 1 in (1.85 m)
- Position: Goalkeeper

Youth career
- –2017: Leicester City
- 2017–2021: Peterborough United

Senior career*
Years	Team	Apps	(Gls)
2021–2026	Peterborough United	7	(0)
Total		7	(0)
- * Club domestic league appearances and goals

William Oliver Blackmore (born 1 October 2001) is a former English footballer who played as a goalkeeper.

== Career ==
Blackmore graduated through Peterborough United's academy and signed a long-term contract in February 2021. He made his senior debut as a substitute in a 4–1 League One win over Doncaster Rovers on 9 May 2021. In July 2023, he signed a new three-year contract with Peterborough. On 2 February 2026, he departed the club by mutual consent..

On 4 May 2026, Blackmore announced his retirement.

== Career statistics ==
As of 2 February 2026

Appearances and goals by club, season and competition
Club	Season	League			FA Cup		EFL Cup		Other		Total	
Club	Season	Division	Apps	Goals	Apps	Goals	Apps	Goals	Apps	Goals	Apps	Goals
Peterborough United	2020–21	League One	1	0	0	0	0	0	0	0	1	0
Peterborough United	2021–22	Championship	0	0	0	0	0	0	—		0	0
Peterborough United	2022–23	League One	3	0	0	0	1	0	0	0	4	0
Peterborough United	2023–24	League One	0	0	0	0	0	0	0	0	0	0
Peterborough United	2024–25	League One	3	0	0	0	0	0	1 (Note: Appearance(s) in EFL Trophy)	0	4	0
Peterborough United	2025–26	League One	0	0	0	0	0	0	1	0	1	0
Career total			7	0	0	0	1	0	2	0	10	0
