= Ephron Mason-Clark =

Jamaican footballer (born 1999)

Personal information
- Full name: Ephron Jardell Mason-Clark
- Date of birth: 25 August 1999 (age 27)
- Place of birth: Lambeth, England
- Height: 1.78 m (5 ft 10 in)
- Positions: Winger; forward

Team information
- Current team: Coventry City
- Number: 10

Youth career
- –2016: Barnet

Senior career*
Years	Team	Apps	(Gls)
2016–2022	Barnet	163	(19)
2016	→ Metropolitan Police (loan)	4	(0)
2022–2024	Peterborough United	66	(19)
2024–	Coventry City	78	(15)
2024	→ Peterborough United (loan)	16	(4)

International career^{‡}
2019–2022	England C	2	(0)
2026–	Jamaica	2	(0)
- * Club domestic league appearances and goals as of 24 May 2026 ‡ National team caps and goals as of 31 March 2026

Ephron Jardell Mason-Clark (born 25 August 1999) is a professional footballer who plays for Premier League team Coventry City. Born in England, he plays for the Jamaica national team.

== Club career ==
=== Barnet ===
Mason-Clark made his debut for Barnet on 4 October 2016, as a 59th-minute substitute for Justin Amaluzor in an EFL Trophy match against Norwich City U23. Mason-Clark joined Metropolitan Police on loan later that month. He made his English Football League debut against Crewe Alexandra on 19 November 2016. In October 2018, Mason-Clark signed a new-long-term deal with the Bees, keeping him with the club until 2021. He scored his first goal for the Bees in the FA Trophy against Bath City on 15 December 2018. His first league goal came on 1 January 2019 against Boreham Wood, and he also won a penalty in the Bees' 1–0 FA Cup third round win away at Sheffield United on 6 January, which was converted by Shaq Coulthirst. He then set up Coulthirst for Barnet's first equaliser against Brentford in their 3–3 draw in the fourth round.

=== Peterborough United ===
On 26 August 2022, Mason-Clark signed for EFL League One club Peterborough United for an undisclosed fee on a three-year contract.

=== Coventry City ===
On 1 February 2024, Mason-Clark signed for Coventry City for an undisclosed fee on a four-year contract, and then returned to Peterborough United on loan until the end of the 2023–24 season.

Mason-Clark was named EFL Championship Player of the Month for December 2024 having scored three goals and assisted a further three.

== International career ==
Mason-Clark was called up to the England C team in June 2019. He made his debut when he started in an away friendly against Estonia U23 on 6 June.

Mason-Clark was called up to the Jamaica national team for the 2026 FIFA World Cup qualification inter-confederation play-offs in March 2026, making his debut against New Caledonia.

== Career statistics ==
=== Club ===
As of match played 24 October 2026

Appearances and goals by club, season and competition
Club	Season	League			FA Cup		EFL Cup		Other		Total	
Club	Season	Division	Apps	Goals	Apps	Goals	Apps	Goals	Apps	Goals	Apps	Goals
Barnet	2016–17	League Two	6	0	0	0	0	0	2 (Note: Appearances in EFL Trophy)	0	8	0
Barnet	2017–18	League Two	8	0	0	0	0	0	1	0	9	0
Barnet	2018–19	National League	38	4	4	0	—		6 (Note: Five appearances and two goals in FA Trophy, one appearance in Middlesex Senior Cup)	2	48	6
Barnet	2019–20	National League	26	4	3	1	—		4 (Note: Two appearances in FA Trophy, two appearances in National League play-offs)	0	33	5
Barnet	2020–21	National League	42	3	2	0	—		1 (Note: Appearance in FA Trophy)	0	45	3
Barnet	2021–22	National League	39	6	1	0	—		0	0	40	6
Barnet	2022–23	National League	4	2	—		—		—		4	2
Barnet	Total		163	19	10	1	0	0	14	2	187	22
Metropolitan Police (Loan)	2016–17	Isthmian League Premier Division	4	0	0	0	—		1	0	5	0
Peterborough United	2022–23	League One	39	9	3	1	0	0	4 (Note: Two appearances in EFL Trophy, two appearances in EFL League One play-offs)	0	46	10
Peterborough United	2023–24	League One	27	10	4	2	1	0	4	3	36	15
Peterborough United (Loan)	2023–24	League One	16	4	—		—		2	0	18	4
Peterborough United (Loan)	Total		82	23	7	3	1	0	10	3	100	29
Coventry City	2024–25	Championship	30	5	0	0	2	0	2 (Note: Appearances in EFL Championship play-offs)	1	34	6
Coventry City	2025–26	Championship	42	10	1	0	0	0	—		43	10
Coventry City	2026–27	Premier League	7	0	0	0	1	1	—		8	1
Coventry City	Total		79	15	1	0	3	1	2	1	85	17
Career total			328	57	18	4	4	1	27	6	377	68

=== International ===
As of match played 31 March 2026

Appearances and goals by national team and year
National team	Year	Apps	Goals
Jamaica	2026	2	0
Total		2	0

== Honours ==
Peterborough United

- EFL Trophy: 2023–24

Coventry City

- EFL Championship: 2025–26

Individual

- EFL League One Team of the Season: 2023–24
- PFA Team of the Year: 2023–24 League One
- EFL Championship Player of the Month: December 2024
