= Charlie O'Connell (footballer) =

English footballer

Personal information
- Full name: Charlie O'Connell
- Date of birth: 19 December 2002 (age 23)
- Place of birth: Maidstone, England
- Height: 1.85 m (6 ft 1 in)
- Position: Defender

Team information
- Current team: Boreham Wood
- Number: 6

Youth career
- –2019: West Ham United
- 2019–2021: Peterborough United

Senior career*
Years	Team	Apps	(Gls)
2021–2024	Peterborough United	2	(0)
2022	→ Kettering Town (loan)	3	(0)
2022–2023	→ Woking (loan)	7	(0)
2023	→ Woking (loan)	6	(0)
2023	→ Woking (loan)	1	(0)
2024	→ Hampton & Richmond Borough (loan)	6	(1)
2024	→ Oxford City (loan)	9	(0)
2024–	Boreham Wood	85	(4)
- * Club domestic league appearances and goals as of 16:28, 5 October 2024 (UTC)

Charlie O'Connell (born 19 December 2002) is an English footballer who plays as a defender or midfielder for Enterprise National League club Boreham Wood.

== Career ==
=== Peterborough United ===
O'Connell made his senior debut as a substitute in a 4–1 League One win over Doncaster Rovers on 9 May 2021.

During the 2021–22 campaign, O'Connell enjoyed a brief loan spell with Kettering Town, featuring three times in all competitions. Proceeding this, he went on to join Woking on three occasions during both 2022–23 and 2023–24 campaigns, returning to the club in October 2023, signing a one-month loan with the Surrey-based side.

Proceeding a brief return to Woking, O'Connell joined National League South side, Hampton & Richmond Borough on loan in February 2024. He went onto feature seven times, scoring once before moving onto Oxford City for the remainder of the campaign. He made his debut that same day in a 2–2 draw with Rochdale.

On 12 May 2024, Peterborough announced the player had been transfer-listed.

On 3 July 2024, O'Connell moved to Boreham Wood for an undisclosed fee on a two-year deal.

== Career statistics ==
As of match played 21 September 2024

Appearances and goals by club, season and competition
Club	Season	League			FA Cup		EFL Cup		Other		Total	
Club	Season	Division	Apps	Goals	Apps	Goals	Apps	Goals	Apps	Goals	Apps	Goals
Peterborough United	2020–21	League One	1	0	0	0	0	0	0	0	1	0
Peterborough United	2021–22	Championship	0	0	0	0	0	0	—		0	0
Peterborough United	2022–23	League One	0	0	0	0	2	0	1 (Note: Appearance in the EFL Trophy)	0	3	0
Peterborough United	2023–24	League One	1	0	0	0	1	0	2	0	4	0
Peterborough United	Total		2	0	0	0	3	0	3	0	8	0
Kettering Town (loan)	2021–22	National League North	3	0	—		—		—		3	0
Woking (loan)	2022–23	National League	13	0	—		—		1 (Note: Appearance in the FA Trophy)	0	14	0
Woking (loan)	2023–24	National League	1	0	2	0	—		0	0	3	0
Woking (loan)	Total		14	0	2	0	—		1	0	17	0
Hampton & Richmond Borough (loan)	2023–24	National League South	6	1	—		—		1	0	7	1
Oxford City (loan)	2023–24	National League	9	0	—		—		—		9	0
Boreham Wood	2024–25	National League South	9	0	0	0	—		0	0	9	0
Career total			43	1	2	0	3	0	5	0	53	1

== Honours ==
Boreham Wood

- National League South play-offs: 2025
