= Josh Knight =

English footballer

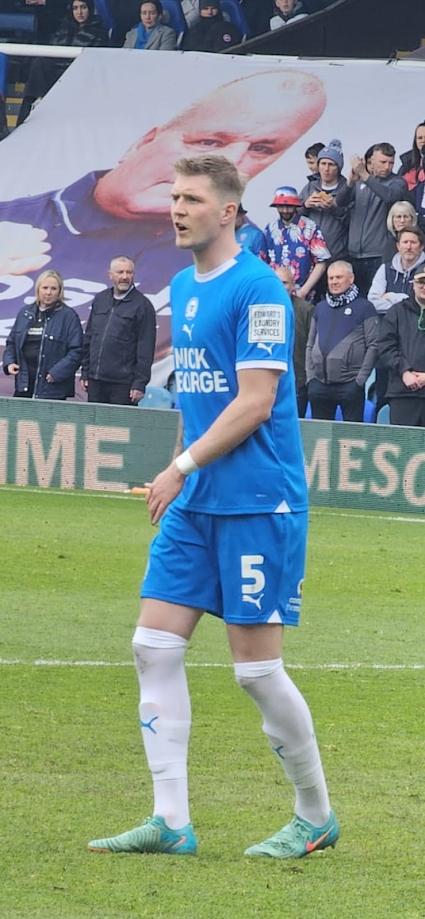
- Knight playing for Peterborough United in 2024

Personal information
- Full name: Joshua Michael Knight
- Date of birth: 7 September 1997 (age 29)
- Place of birth: Fleckney, England
- Height: 6 ft 1 in (1.85 m)
- Positions: Defender; defensive midfielder

Team information
- Current team: Reading (on loan from Portsmouth)
- Number: 20

Youth career
- –2016: Leicester City

Senior career*
Years	Team	Apps	(Gls)
2016–2021	Leicester City	1	(0)
2019	→ Peterborough United (loan)	8	(0)
2019–2020	→ Peterborough United (loan)	24	(3)
2020–2021	→ Wycombe Wanderers (loan)	37	(1)
2021–2024	Peterborough United	109	(6)
2024–2025	Hannover 96	23	(3)
2025–	Portsmouth	14	(0)
2026–	→ Reading (loan)	1	(0)
- * Club domestic league appearances and goals

Joshua Michael Knight (born 7 September 1997) is an English professional footballer who plays as a centre-back, right-back or defensive midfielder for EFL League One club Reading, on loan from Championship club Portsmouth.

== Early life ==
Knight was born to Sue and Mick and attended Robert Smyth Academy in Market Harborough. He and his family are lifelong Leicester City fans.

== Career ==
=== Leicester City ===
Knight began his football at Fleckney Athletic and joined the Leicester City Academy at the age of eight. Knight received his scholarship at the age of sixteen, making numerous appearances for the U18s and signed his first professional contract with the club as he turned 18.

Knight made his debut for Leicester City on 22 August 2017 in a victory in the Football League Cup away at Sheffield United. On 11 January 2019, Knight was awarded Premier League 2 player of the month for December.

==== Peterborough United (loan) ====
On 31 January 2019, Knight signed a new contract with Leicester and joined Peterborough United on loan for the rest of the season. He made his debut for the club against Oxford United on 16 February 2019, but came off injured in the 22nd minute.

On 2 August 2019, Knight re-signed for Peterborough on loan for the 2019–20 season.

Knight scored his first senior goal in a 3–0 victory over Sunderland on 31 August 2019.

==== Wycombe Wanderers (loan) ====
Knight signed a short-term loan with Championship club Wycombe Wanderers on 5 October 2020. On 7 January 2021, this loan spell was extended until the end of the 2020–21 season. He scored his first goal for Wycombe in an FA Cup tie against Preston North End on 9 January 2021.

Knight won both the Supporters' and Players' Player of the Year awards at the end of the season.

=== Peterborough United ===
On 2 July 2021, Knight signed for Peterborough on a permanent deal following two previous loan spells at the club.

On 7 April 2024, Knight was a part of the Peterborough United squad that defeated Wycombe Wanderers in the 2024 EFL Trophy final.

Following the conclusion of the 2023–24 season, Knight was offered a new contract by Peterborough. In May 2024, it was reported that Knight had been offered lucrative terms by an overseas club, initially suggested to be Werder Bremen.

=== Hannover 96 ===
On 11 June 2024, Knight agreed to join 2. Bundesliga club Hannover 96 on a two-year contract with the option for a further twelve months.

=== Portsmouth ===
On 21 August 2025, Knight signed for Championship club Portsmouth on a three-year contract.

==== Reading (loan) ====
Knight signed for EFL League One club Reading on a season-long loan from Portsmouth on 28 August 2026.

== Career statistics ==
As of 21 August 2025

Appearances and goals by club, season and competition
Club	Season	League			Cup		EFL Cup		Other		Total	
Club	Season	Division	Apps	Goals	Apps	Goals	Apps	Goals	Apps	Goals	Apps	Goals
Leicester City U21	2016–17	—			—		—		1 (Note: Appearance(s) in EFL Trophy)	0	1	0
Leicester City U21	2017–18	—			—		—		5	2	5	2
Leicester City U21	2018–19	—			—		—		3	0	3	0
Leicester City U21	Total		—		—		—		9	2	9	2
Leicester City	2017–18	Premier League	0	0	0	0	1	0	—		1	0
Leicester City	2018–19	Premier League	0	0	0	0	0	0	—		0	0
Leicester City	2019–20	Premier League	0	0	0	0	0	0	—		0	0
Leicester City	2020–21	Premier League	0	0	0	0	0	0	0	0	0	0
Leicester City	Total		0	0	0	0	1	0	0	0	1	0
Peterborough United (loan)	2018–19	League One	8	0	0	0	0	0	0	0	8	0
Peterborough United (loan)	2019–20	League One	24	3	0	0	1	0	1	0	26	3
Peterborough United (loan)	Total		32	3	0	0	1	0	1	0	34	3
Wycombe Wanderers (loan)	2020–21	Championship	37	1	2	1	0	0	—		39	2
Peterborough United	2021–22	Championship	36	0	2	0	1	0	—		39	0
Peterborough United	2022–23	League One	30	1	3	0	2	0	4 (Note: Three appearances one goal in EFL Trophy, one appearance in League One play-offs)	1	39	2
Peterborough United	2023–24	League One	43	5	4	0	3	0	7 (Note: Five appearances in EFL Trophy, two appearances and one goal in League One play-offs)	1	57	6
Peterborough United	Total		109	6	9	0	6	0	11	2	135	8
Hannover 96	2024–25	2. Bundesliga	23	3	1	0	—		—		24	3
Portsmouth	2025–26	Championship	14	0	0	0	0	0	—		14	0
Career total			215	13	12	1	8	0	21	4	256	18

== Honours ==
Peterborough United

- EFL Trophy: 2023–24

Individual

- Wycombe Wanderers Player of the Season: 2020–21
