= Jadel Katongo =

English association football player

Personal information
- Full name: Jadel Chanda Katongo
- Date of birth: 14 September 2004 (age 22)
- Place of birth: Manchester, England
- Height: 1.84 m (6 ft 0 in)
- Position: Defender

Youth career
- –2023: Manchester City

Senior career*
Years	Team	Apps	(Gls)
2022–2026	Manchester City	0	(0)
2023–2024	→ Peterborough United (loan)	32	(1)
2024–2025	→ Peterborough United (loan)	17	(0)
2026	Kayserispor	10	(0)

International career^{‡}
2019	England U15	4	(0)
2019	England U16	1	(0)
2021	England U18	2	(0)
2023–2024	England U20	4	(0)
- * Club domestic league appearances and goals as of 26 May 2026; 10:46 (UTC) ‡ National team caps and goals as of 13:33, 27 March 2024 (UTC)

Jadel Chanda Katongo (born 14 September 2004) is an English professional footballer who plays as a defender and has represented England at under-20 international level. A product of Manchester City's academy and a two-time EFL Trophy winner with Peterborough United, he ranked among the best defenders in EFL League One for passing accuracy during the 2024–25 season, placing in the top 4%.

== Early life ==
Katongo joined Manchester City when he was in the under-9 age group. He continued through the academy and was the youngest member of their U18 title winning team in 2020-21.

== Career ==
=== Manchester City ===
Katongo played for Manchester City in the EFL Trophy during the 2022-23 season.

=== Peterborough United (loan) ===
In August 2023, Katongo joined Peterborough United on a season-long loan. Katongo scored on his debut for Peterborough, against Cambridge United in a 2-0 win in the EFL Trophy. Later that month he made his debut in the EFL Cup as Peterborough suffered a penalty shoot-out defeat to Mansfield on 26 September 2023. On 30 August 2024, Katongo returned to Peterborough on loan until the end of the 2024–25 season.

=== Kayserispor ===
On 17 January 2026, Katongo joined Turkish Süper Lig side Kayserispor.

== Style of play ==
Katongo has been described as a ball-playing centre-half. It is considered he could also play as a right-back. Whilst on loan at Peterborough, he was tried in midfield.

== International career ==
Katongo was born in England to a Zambian father and British mother. He has expressed an interest in playing for the Zambia national team. He was invited to train with the Zambian first team by head coach Avram Grant in 2023. He declined an invitation to represent Zambia first in 2022 when he was selected for the U-23 AFCON squad and then again in 2025 ahead of the Africa Cup of Nations.

Katongo is a youth international for England, and in September 2023 was called up to the England U20 squad. In October 2023, he was called up to the England U-20 side for matches against Portugal U-20 and Romania U-20. He made his U20 debut on 12 October 2023, during a 2–0 away defeat to Romania.

== Honours ==
Peterborough United

- EFL Trophy: 2023–24, 2024–25
