= Andrew Oluwabori =

English footballer (born 2001)

Personal information
- Full name: Andrew Jose Oluwabori
- Birth name: Oluwadamilare Andrew Ijiwole
- Date of birth: 30 September 2001 (age 25)
- Place of birth: Hackney, England
- Positions: Left winger; forward

Team information
- Current team: Exeter City
- Number: 11

Youth career
- Queens Park Rangers
- Southampton
- 2018–2020: Huddersfield Town

Senior career*
Years	Team	Apps	(Gls)
2019–2020	Huddersfield Town	0	(0)
2019	→ Ossett United (loan)	6	(0)
2020	Edgware Town	2	(0)
2021–2023	Peterborough United	0	(0)
2021	→ Boreham Wood (loan)	3	(0)
2022	→ Kettering Town (loan)	10	(4)
2022–2023	→ Yeovil Town (loan)	25	(2)
2023–2025	FC Halifax Town	66	(10)
2025–	Exeter City	11	(1)
2025–2026	→ Yeovil Town (loan)	12	(1)
- * Club domestic league appearances and goals as of 11:48, 27 September 2026 (UTC)

Andrew Jose Oluwabori (born Oluwadamilare Andrew Ijiwole on 30 September 2001) is an English professional footballer who plays for Exeter City, as a left winger and forward.

== Career ==
Born in Hackney, Oluwabori spent his early career with Queens Park Rangers and Southampton. He joined Huddersfield Town on a two-year scholarship in summer 2018. In August 2019, he joined Northern Premier League club Ossett United on a work experience loan. Two months later, he went on trial at Manchester City where he played in two under-18 matches, and then two further under-18 games on trial at Stoke City in January 2020.

After being released by Huddersfield at the end of the 2019-20 season, he played twice in the Spartan South Midlands Football League for Edgware Town in the 2020–21 season.

He signed for Peterborough United in September 2021. He moved on loan to Boreham Wood in November 2021, to Kettering Town in August 2022, and to Yeovil Town in November 2022. His loan at Yeovil was extended in January 2023 until the end of the season.

After leaving Peterborough he signed for FC Halifax Town in June 2023. In February 2024, manager Chris Millington praised Oluwabori for his improving performances for the Shaymen.

In February 2025 he signed for Exeter City.

Oluwabori returned on loan to National League side Yeovil Town on 19 September 2025, on a deal running until January 2026.

== Playing style ==
Oluwabori is "predominantly a left-winger", although he is right-footed.

== Career statistics ==
As of match played 26 September 2026

Appearances and goals by club, season and competition
Club	Season	League			FA Cup		EFL Cup		Other		Total	
Club	Season	Division	Apps	Goals	Apps	Goals	Apps	Goals	Apps	Goals	Apps	Goals
Huddersfield Town	2019–20	Championship	0	0	0	0	0	0	0	0	0	0
Ossett United (loan)	2019–20	NPL Division One North West	6	0	5	0	—		0	0	11	0
Edgware Town	2020–21	SSML Premier Division	2	0	0	0	—		0	0	2	0
Peterborough United	2021–22	Championship	0	0	0	0	0	0	0	0	0	0
Peterborough United	2022–23	League One	0	0	0	0	0	0	0	0	0	0
Peterborough United	Total		0	0	0	0	0	0	0	0	0	0
Boreham Wood (loan)	2021–22	National League	3	0	—		—		—		3	0
Kettering Town (loan)	2022–23	National League North	10	4	1	0	—		—		11	4
Yeovil Town (loan)	2022–23	National League	25	2	0	0	—		2 (Note: One appearance in FA Trophy, one appearance in Somerset Premier Cup)	0	27	2
FC Halifax Town	2023–24	National League	39	4	1	0	—		0	0	40	4
FC Halifax Town	2024–25	National League	27	6	1	0	—		5 (Note: One appearances in FA Trophy, four appearances and one goal in National League Cup)	1	33	7
FC Halifax Town	Total		66	10	2	0	0	0	5	1	73	11
Exeter City	2024–25	League One	6	1	0	0	0	0	0	0	6	1
Exeter City	2025–26	League One	0	0	0	0	1	0	1 (Note: Appearance in the EFL Trophy)	0	2	0
Exeter City	2026–27	League One	5	0	0	0	1	0	0	0	6	0
Exeter City	Total		11	1	0	0	2	0	1	0	14	1
Yeovil Town (loan)	2025–26	National League	12	1	1	0	—		1 (Note: Appearance in FA Trophy)	0	14	1
Career total			135	18	9	0	2	0	9	1	155	19
