= Joe Ward (footballer, born 1995) =

English footballer

Personal information
- Full name: Joseph Henry Ward
- Date of birth: 22 August 1995 (age 31)
- Place of birth: Chelmsford, England
- Height: 5 ft 6 in (1.67 m)
- Position: Winger

Team information
- Current team: Derby County
- Number: 23

Youth career
- 2009–2013: Chelmsford City

Senior career*
Years	Team	Apps	(Gls)
2013–2015	Chelmsford City	63	(8)
2013	→ Stanway Rovers (loan)	6	(0)
2015–2017	Brighton & Hove Albion	0	(0)
2017	→ Lincoln City (loan)	2	(0)
2017–2018	Woking	27	(6)
2018–2023	Peterborough United	202	(18)
2023–	Derby County	76	(3)

International career^{‡}
2017	England C	1	(0)
- * Club domestic league appearances and goals as of 18:05, 24 October 2026 (UTC) ‡ National team caps and goals as of 21:00, 13 January 2018 (UTC)

Joseph Henry Ward (born 22 August 1995) is an English professional footballer who plays as a winger for EFL Championship club Derby County.

Ward started his career at hometown club Chelmsford City in 2009, making his first-team debut in 2013, and having a loan spell at Stanway Rovers that same year. After trials with several Premier League club in 2015, Ward signed with Brighton & Hove Albion, but failed to break into the first team, and joined Lincoln City on loan in 2017. In June 2017, Ward was released by Brighton and signed with Woking.

Ward joined Peterborough United in January 2018, making his Football League debut in the same month, and helping Peterborough gain promotion to the Championship in 2021. He was named in the League One Team of the Year for the 2021–22 season. After making 232 appearances, Ward left Peterborough in June 2023 and joined fellow League One side Derby County. In his first season for the club he helped the club gain promotion to the Championship.

== Club career ==
=== Chelmsford City ===
After initially featuring for the Chelmsford City youth sides whilst on a BTEC scholarship scheme, Ward made his debut for the club during their 6–0 home victory over Farnborough in the 2012–13 campaign at the age of 16. On 30 November 2013, Ward scored on his first start for Chelmsford City, once again against Farnborough, in a 3–1 win. On 23 April 2014, Ward scored the goal to save Chelmsford City from relegation from the Conference South in a 1–0 win over Gosport Borough. In his final campaign at Chelmsford, Ward netted eleven times, including six goals during their impressive FA Cup run, in which they reached the fourth qualifying round before being knocked out by Barnet.

In 2013, Ward spent time on loan with Stanway Rovers, making six league appearances.

=== Brighton & Hove Albion ===
Following trials with both West Ham United and Brighton & Hove Albion in summer 2015, Brighton & Hove Albion signed Ward on a development contract on 3 June 2015.

After failing to break through into the first-team squad, Ward was sent out on loan to National League side Lincoln City on a one-month basis in January 2017. A day later, he made his debut during Lincoln's FA Trophy second-round victory over Gateshead, playing the entire 90 minutes in the 3–1 triumph. In the following round, Ward netted twice during Lincoln's 3–1 away victory against Welling United. Six days later, Ward's loan spell was extended for a further two months following some impressive form, especially in their FA Trophy campaign.

=== Woking ===
On 21 June 2017, Ward signed for National League club Woking on a two-year deal following his release from Brighton & Hove Albion.

On the opening day of the 2017–18 campaign, Ward netted in Woking's 2–1 home victory over Gateshead, sealing the winner in the 44th minute. Ward went onto net five more times during their league campaign, including goals against Torquay United, Macclesfield Town, Maidstone United, AFC Fylde and Dover Athletic. Following this impressive form, Ward received his first call-up to the England C squad, in which he featured for 45 minutes during their 4–0 International Challenge Trophy final defeat against Slovakia U23s. During Woking's impressive FA Cup run, Ward netted the Cards' equaliser in their second round tie against League One side Peterborough United.

=== Peterborough United ===
On 10 January 2018, Ward joined League One side Peterborough United following his impressive performances against them, on a two-and-a-half-year deal for an undisclosed fee. Three days later, Ward made his debut for Peterborough, as well as his Football League debut, in a 0–0 draw with Wigan Athletic, replacing Michael Doughty in the 68th minute. Following an impressive 2020–21 season, Ward was named in the 2020–21 EFL League One Team of the Season at the league's annual awards ceremony.

He was offered a new three-year contract at the end of the 2022–23 season.

=== Derby County ===
In June 2023 it was announced that he would sign for Derby County on 1 July 2023, on a three-year contract. Ward made his Derby debut in a 2–1 defeat to Wigan Athletic on 5 August 2023. Ward impressed with his performances in a difficult to the 2023–24 season for Derby, however Ward picked up a heel injury in Derby's match against Oxford United on 15 August 2023 which ruled him out of action for eight weeks. Upon his return to the team, Ward struggled to cement a place in the Derby team, being demoted to the under-21s to keep him match fit. In December 2023, Ward conceded penalties in back-to back games to Wycombe Wanderers who scored the 96th minute equalising penalty and Lincoln City. On 2 March 2024, Ward returned to the Derby starting lineup against Port Vale, assisted two of Derby's three goals in the 3–0 win, as Derby returned to a wing-back formation which played to Ward's strengths, this performance earned praise from former Derby player Malcolm Christie who was working as match analyst for BBC Radio Derby. On 2 April 2024, Ward scored twice, his first goals for the club, in a 2–2 draw at Portsmouth. During this match, Ward picked up a knee injury which later required surgery which ended his season with an expected recovery time of two months, having made 26 appearances during his first season at Derby. Derby secured automatic promotion the Championship after finishing runners-up in League One.

Ward found appearances in the first-team hard to come by in the first two months of the 2024–25 season; playing in under-21 matches to maintain fitness. Ward made eight appearances for Derby during the season; in January 2025 he underwent knee surgery which ended his season early.

After a seven-month absence, Ward scored on his return from injury in Derby's EFL Cup match at West Bromwich Albion on 12 August 2025, directly from a free kick. Ward scored his first career Championship goal on 16 August 2025 in a 3–5 loss to Coventry City. After new signing Max Johnston was sidelined due to a hamstring injury in late October 2025, Ward replaced him as the regular wing back in the Derby team, creating four assists in his first four league starts as his performances helped Derby have an upturn in form in November. Ward was sent off for the first time in his Derby career, as he picked up two yellow cards at Birmingham City on 26 December 2025. On 13 March 2026, it was announced Derby County had trigged a one-year extension clause in Ward's contract, which would now expire in June 2027. Ward made 41 Derby County appearances during the season, scoring two goals and creating 10 assists.

== Career statistics ==
As of match played 24 October 2026

Club	Season	League			FA Cup		League Cup		Other		Total	
Club	Season	Division	Apps	Goals	Apps	Goals	Apps	Goals	Apps	Goals	Apps	Goals
Chelmsford City	2012–13	Conference South	1	0	0	0	—		0	0	1	0
Chelmsford City	2013–14	Conference South	25	3	0	0	—		1 (Note: Appearance in Essex Senior Cup.)	0	26	3
Chelmsford City	2014–15	Conference South	37	5	5	6	—		2 (Note: One appearance in the Essex Senior Cup, one appearance in the FA Trophy.)	0	44	11
Chelmsford City	Total		63	8	5	6	0	0	1	0	69	14
Brighton & Hove Albion	2015–16	Championship	0	0	0	0	0	0	0	0	0	0
Brighton & Hove Albion	2016–17	Championship	0	0	0	0	0	0	—		0	0
Brighton & Hove Albion	Total		0	0	0	0	0	0	0	0	0	0
Lincoln City (loan)	2016–17	National League	2	0	2	0	—		4 (Note: Appearance in the FA Trophy.)	3	8	3
Woking	2017–18	National League	27	6	6	1	—		1	0	34	7
Peterborough United	2017–18	League One	17	0	0	0	0	0	1 (Note: Appearance(s) in the Football League Trophy.)	0	18	0
Peterborough United	2018–19	League One	43	4	4	1	1	0	4	0	52	5
Peterborough United	2019–20	League One	28	3	3	0	1	0	4	2	36	5
Peterborough United	2020–21	League One	37	5	0	0	1	0	2	0	40	5
Peterborough United	2021–22	Championship	38	0	2	1	1	0	—		41	1
Peterborough United	2022–23	League One	39	6	0	0	2	0	4 (Note: Two appearances in the EFL Trophy; two appearance and one goal in the play-offs.)	1	45	7
Peterborough United	Total		202	18	9	2	6	0	15	3	232	23
Derby County	2023–24	League One	21	2	2	0	1	0	2	0	26	2
Derby County	2024–25	Championship	7	0	0	0	1	0	—		8	0
Derby County	2025–26	Championship	38	1	1	0	2	1	—		41	2
Derby County	2026–27	Championship	10	0	0	0	1	0	—		11	0
Derby County	Total		76	3	3	0	5	1	2	0	86	4
Career total			370	35	25	9	11	1	25	6	431	51

== Honours ==
Derby County

- EFL League One second-place promotion: 2023–24

Individual

- EFL League One Team of the Season: 2020–21
