= 2022–23 Peterborough United F.C. season =

Peterborough United FC
2022–23 season
- Owner: Darragh MacAnthony (50%); Kelgary Sports and Entertainment (50%)
- Chairman: Darragh MacAnthony
- Manager: Grant McCann (until 4 January); Darren Ferguson (from 4 January)
- Stadium: Weston Homes Stadium
- League One: 6th (play-offs)
- FA Cup: Second round
- EFL Cup: Second round
- EFL Trophy: Second round
- Top goalscorer: League: Jonson Clarke-Harris (26); All: Jonson Clarke-Harris (29)
Third colours

The 2022–23 season is the 89th season in the existence of Peterborough United Football Club and the club's first season back in League One since the 2020–21 season following their relegation in the previous season. In addition to the league, they will also compete in the 2022–23 FA Cup, the 2022–23 EFL Cup and the 2022–23 EFL Trophy.

== First-team squad ==
As of 22 October 2022

Note: Flags indicate national team as has been defined under FIFA eligibility rules. Players may hold more than one non-FIFA nationality.

No.	Name	Nat.	Position(s)	Date of birth (age)	Apps.	Goals	Year signed	Signed from	Transfer fee
Goalkeepers
1	Lucas Bergström	(Finland)	GK	5 September 2002 (age 23)	18	0	2022	(England) Chelsea	Loan
13	Harvey Cartwright	(England)	GK	9 May 2002 (age 24)	1	0	2022	(England) Hull City	Loan
28	Will Blackmore	(England)	GK	1 October 2001 (age 24)	2	0	2020	Academy	Trainee
Defenders
3	Dan Butler	(England)	LB/LM	26 August 1994 (aged 26)	110	3	2019	(Wales) Newport County	Free
4	Ronnie Edwards	(England)	CB/DM	28 March 2003 (aged 18)	54	0	2020	(England) Barnet	Undisclosed
5	Josh Knight	(England)	CB/RB/DM	7 September 1997 (age 28)	90	5	2021	(England) Leicester City	Undisclosed
6	Frankie Kent	(England)	CB	21 November 1995 (aged 25)	137	5	2019	(England) Colchester United	£360,000
12	Nathan Thompson	(England) (Wales)	CB/RB/DM	9 November 1990 (aged 30)	105	4	2019	(England) Portsmouth	Free
20	Emmanuel Fernandez	(England)	CB	20 November 2001 (age 24)	1	0	2021	(England) Ramsgate	Undisclosed
21	Joe Tomlinson	(England)	LB	9 June 2000 (age 25)	13	0	2021	(England) Eastleigh	Undisclosed
29	Benjamin Mensah	(Italy) (Ghana)	CB	30 December 2002 (age 23)	4	0	2019	Academy	Trainee
36	Charlie O'Connell	(England)	CB/DM	19 December 2002 (age 23)	4	0	2021	Academy	Trainee
Midfielders
7	Jeando Fuchs	(Cameroon) (France)	DM/RB/LB	11 October 1997 (age 28)	36	0	2022	(Scotland) Dundee United	Undisclosed
8	Jack Taylor	(Republic of Ireland) (England)	CM/RM/RB	23 June 1998 (age 27)	102	14	2020	(England) Barnet	£500,000
11	Kwame Poku	(Ghana) (England)	AM/RW/LW	11 August 2001 (age 24)	34	2	2021	(England) Colchester United	Undisclosed
16	Harrison Burrows	(England)	LM/LB/CM	12 January 2002 (aged 19)	95	6	2017	Academy	Trainee
18	Oliver Norburn	(Grenada) (England)	CM/RM/LM	26 October 1992 (age 33)	38	0	2021	(England) Shrewsbury Town	Undisclosed
19	David Ajiboye	(England) (Nigeria)	RW/RM	28 September 1998 (age 27)	6	0	2022	(England) Sutton United	Undisclosed
22	Hector Kyprianou	(Cyprus) (England)	DM/CM/CB	27 May 2001 (age 24)	13	1	2022	(England) Leyton Orient	Undisclosed
23	Joe Ward	(England)	RM/RW/RB	22 August 1995 (aged 25)	205	19	2018	(England) Woking	Undisclosed
24	Ben Thompson	(England)	CM/AM	3 October 1995 (age 30)	18	1	2022	(England) Gillingham	Free
26	Joel Randall	(England)	LM/LB/CM	1 November 1999 (age 26)	23	0	2021	(England) Exeter City	Undisclosed
Forwards
9	Jonson Clarke-Harris	(Jamaica) (England)	CF	21 July 1994 (aged 26)	110	56	2020	(England) Bristol Rovers	£1,250,000
10	Ephron Mason-Clark	(England)	CF	25 August 1999 (age 26)	10	0	2022	(England) Barnet	Undisclosed
14	Jack Marriott	(England)	CF	9 September 1994 (age 31)	104	47	2021	(England) Derby County	Free
17	Ricky-Jade Jones	(England)	CF/SS/LW	8 November 2002 (age 23)	70	11	2019	Academy	Trainee
27	Joe Taylor	(Wales) (England)	CF	18 November 2002 (age 23)	14	1	2021	(England) King's Lynn Town	Undisclosed
Out on Loan
33	Christy Pym	(England) (Republic of Ireland)	GK	24 April 1995 (age 31)	94	0	2019	(England) Exeter City	Free

== Statistics ==
As of as of games played on 05 November 2022

No.	Pos	Nat	Player	Total		League One		FA Cup		EFL Cup		EFL Trophy	
No.	Pos	Nat	Player	Apps	Goals	Apps	Goals	Apps	Goals	Apps	Goals	Apps	Goals
1	GK	(Finland) FIN	Lucas Bergström	21	0	17+0	0	1+0	0	1+0	0	2+0	0
2	DF	(England) ENG	Kelland Watts	4	0	0+2	0	1+0	0	0+0	0	1+0	0
3	DF	(England) ENG	Dan Butler	10	0	7+1	0	1+0	0	0+0	0	1+0	0
4	DF	(England) ENG	Ronnie Edwards	13	0	12+0	0	0+0	0	0+0	0	1+0	0
5	DF	(England) ENG	Josh Knight	19	2	10+4	1	1+0	0	2+0	0	2+0	1
6	DF	(England) ENG	Frankie Kent	19	0	16+0	0	0+0	0	1+0	0	1+1	0
7	MF	(Cameroon) CMR	Jeando Fuchs	19	0	13+1	0	1+0	0	1+1	0	2+0	0
8	MF	(Republic of Ireland) IRL	Jack Taylor	20	2	16+0	2	1+0	0	1+1	0	1+0	0
9	FW	(Jamaica) JAM	Jonson Clarke-Harris	21	12	17+0	11	0+1	0	0+1	0	1+1	1
10	FW	(England) ENG	Ephron Mason-Clark	13	1	3+7	1	1+0	0	0+0	0	2+0	0
11	MF	(Ghana) GHA	Kwame Poku	13	3	8+2	3	0+0	0	1+0	0	2+0	0
12	DF	(England) ENG	Nathan Thompson	19	1	9+7	1	1+0	0	1+0	0	1+0	0
13	GK	(England) ENG	Harvey Cartwright	1	0	0+0	0	0+0	0	0+0	0	1+0	0
14	FW	(England) ENG	Jack Marriott	21	5	7+10	4	1+0	0	0+1	0	1+1	1
16	MF	(England) ENG	Harrison Burrows	21	2	15+2	2	1+0	0	0+0	0	2+1	0
17	FW	(England) ENG	Ricky Jade-Jones	17	5	7+5	2	1+0	0	2+0	1	2+0	2
19	MF	(England) ENG	David Ajiboye	7	0	0+3	0	0+1	0	2+0	0	0+1	0
21	DF	(England) ENG	Joe Tomlinson	6	0	0+2	0	0+0	0	2+0	0	2+0	0
22	MF	(Cyprus) CYP	Hector Kyprianou	18	1	4+9	1	0+0	0	2+0	0	2+1	0
23	MF	(England) ENG	Joe Ward	19	2	13+2	2	0+0	0	0+2	0	2+0	0
24	MF	(England) ENG	Ben Thompson	19	1	11+3	1	0+1	0	0+2	0	1+1	0
26	MF	(England) ENG	Joel Randall	11	0	1+6	0	0+0	0	1+0	0	2+1	0
27	FW	(England) ENG	Joe Taylor	11	1	0+5	0	0+1	0	2+0	1	0+3	0
28	GK	(England) ENG	Will Blackmore	1	0	0+0	0	0+0	0	1+0	0	0+0	0
36	DF	(England) ENG	Charlie O'Connell	3	0	0+0	0	0+0	0	2+0	0	1+0	0
42	FW	(England) ENG	Gabriel Overton	1	0	0+0	0	0+0	0	0+1	0	0+0	0
Players who left the club:
10	MF	(Republic of Ireland) IRL	Sammie Szmodics	1	0	1+0	0	0+0	0	0+0	0	0+0	0

=== Goals record ===
As of 12 May 2023

Rank	No.	Nat.	Po.	Name	League One	FA Cup	EFL Cup	EFL Trophy	Play-offs	Total
1	9	(Jamaica)	CF	Jonson Clarke-Harris	26	0	0	2	1	29
2	8	(Republic of Ireland)	CM	Jack Taylor	8	0	0	1	1	10
2	10	(England)	FW	Ephron Mason-Clark	9	1	0	0	0	10
4	14	(England)	CF	Jack Marriott	4	2	0	1	0	7
4	23	(England)	RM	Joe Ward	6	0	0	0	1	7
6	11	(Ghana)	DM	Kwame Poku	4	1	0	0	1	6
6	17	(England)	CF	Ricky Jade-Jones	3	0	1	2	0	6
8	16	(England)	DF	Harrison Burrows	4	0	0	0	0	4
9	22	(Cyprus)	DM	Hector Kyprianou	3	0	0	0	0	3
10	5	(England)	DF	Josh Knight	1	0	0	1	0	2
11	12	(England)	DF	Nathan Thompson	1	0	0	0	0	1
11	24	(England)	CM	Ben Thompson	1	0	0	0	0	1
11	27	(England)	CF	Joe Taylor	0	0	1	0	0	1
Total					75	4	2	7	4	92

=== Disciplinary record ===
As of 23 August 2022

Rank	No.	Nat.	Po.	Name	League One			FA Cup			EFL Cup			EFL Trophy			Total		
Rank	No.	Nat.	Po.	Name	Booked	(yellow card) (yellow-red card)	Sent off (straight red)	Booked	(yellow card) (yellow-red card)	Sent off (straight red)	Booked	(yellow card) (yellow-red card)	Sent off (straight red)	Booked	(yellow card) (yellow-red card)	Sent off (straight red)	Booked	(yellow card) (yellow-red card)	Sent off (straight red)
1	6	(England)	CB	Frankie Kent	3	0	0	0	0	0	0	0	0	0	0	0	3	0	0
1	5	(England)	CB	Josh Knight	1	0	0	0	0	0	2	0	0	0	0	0	3	0	0
3	7	(Cameroon)	CM	Jeando Fuchs	1	0	0	0	0	0	0	0	0	0	0	0	1	0	0
3	14	(England)	CF	Jack Marriott	1	0	0	0	0	0	0	0	0	0	0	0	1	0	0
3	24	(England)	CM	Ben Thompson	1	0	0	0	0	0	0	0	0	0	0	0	1	0	0
Total					7	0	0	0	0	0	2	0	0	0	0	0	9	0	0

== Transfers ==
=== In ===
Date	Pos	Player	Transferred from	Fee	Ref
22 June 2022	RW	(England) David Ajiboye	(England) Sutton United	Undisclosed	
22 June 2022	DM	(Cyprus) Hector Kyprianou	(England) Leyton Orient	Undisclosed	
1 July 2022 (Note: The transfer was announced on 23 June, and would become official on July 1, once his West Bromwich Albion contract expired)	CM	(Scotland) MacKenzie Lamb	(England) West Bromwich Albion	Free Transfer	
1 July 2022 (Note: The transfer was announced on 14 June, and would become official on July 1, once his Gillingham contract expired)	CM	(England) Ben Thompson	(England) Gillingham	Free Transfer	
12 July 2022	DF	(England) Ashton Fox	(England) Dereham Town	Free Transfer	
26 August 2022	CF	(England) Ephron Mason-Clark	(England) Barnet	Undisclosed	
23 January 2023	CB	(England) Sam Dreyer	(England) Bedford Town	Undisclosed	

=== Out ===
Date	Pos	Player	Transferred to	Fee	Ref
20 June 2022	CB	(England) Mark Beevers	(Australia) Perth Glory	Mutual consent	
27 June 2022	CM	(England) Jorge Grant	(Scotland) Heart of Midlothian	Undisclosed	
30 June 2022	DM	(England) Kyle Barker	(England) Peterborough Sports	Released	
30 June 2022	CM	(The Gambia) Ethan Bojang	(England) Gainsborough Trinity	Released	
30 June 2022	CM	(Malaysia) Kobe Jae Chong	(England) AFC Telford United	Released	
30 June 2022	GK	(Wales) David Cornell	(England) Preston North End	Released	
30 June 2022	CM	(England) Connor Peters	(Gibraltar) St Joseph's	Released	
30 June 2022	AM	(Azerbaijan) Serhat Tasdemir	(England) Buxton	Released	
1 August 2022	AM	(Republic of Ireland) Sammie Szmodics	(England) Blackburn Rovers	Undiscloed	
1 September 2022	RM	(Wales) Ryan Broom	(England) Cheltenham Town	Undiscloed	
1 September 2022	FW	(England) Harmeed Ishola	(England) Maldon & Tiptree	Mutual Consent	
1 September 2022	RW	(Sierra Leone) Idris Kanu	(England) Barnet	Undiscloed	
30 January 2023	CF	(England) Jack Marriott	(England) Fleetwood Town	Undisclosed	
31 January 2023	CF	(Wales) Joe Taylor	(England) Luton Town	Undisclosed	

=== Loans in ===
Date	Pos	Player	Loaned from	On loan until	Ref
17 June 2022	GK	(England) Harvey Cartwright	(England) Hull City	16 January 2023 (Note: On 16 January, Cartwright's loan from Hull was cut short)	
18 June 2022	GK	(Finland) Lucas Bergström	(England) Chelsea	17 January 2023 (Note: On 17 January, Bergström was recalled back to Chelsea)	
1 September 2022	CB	(England) Kelland Watts	(England) Newcastle United	End of Season (Note: On 6 January, Watts' loan from Newcastle was extended until end of the season)	
6 January 2023	GK	(England) Will Norris	(England) Burnley	End of Season	
13 January 2023	LB	(England) Nathanael Ogbeta	(Wales) Swansea City	End of Season	
31 January 2023	CF	(Democratic Republic of the Congo) Kabongo Tshimanga	(England) Chesterfield	End of Season	

=== Loans out ===
Date	Pos	Player	Loaned to	On loan until	Ref
12 July 2022	GK	(England) Christy Pym	(England) Mansfield Town	End of Season	
22 July 2022	LB	(England) Aaron Powell	(England) Dereham Town	Youth Loan	
5 August 2022	RB	(Hungary) János Bodnár	(England) Kettering Town	Youth Loan	
5 August 2022	RW	(England) Andrew Oluwabori	(England) Kettering Town	Youth Loan	
9 August 2022	CM	(England) Luke Harris	(England) Yaxley	Youth Loan	
8 November 2022	RW	(England) Andrew Oluwabori	(England) Yeovil Town	7 January 2023	
10 November 2022	RW	(Ghana) Johnson Gyamfi	(England) Boston United	10 December 2022	
10 November 2022	LB	(England) Oscar Tonge	(England) Halesowen Town	10 December 2022	
2 December 2022	CB	(England) Charlie O'Connell	(England) Woking	28 February 2023 (Note: On 31 January, O'Connell's loan at Woking was extended by a further month)	
23 December 2022	MF	(Tunisia) Hisham Chiha	(England) Yaxley	23 January 2023	
1 January 2023 (Note: The loan agreement was announced on 30 December, and would become official on January 1, when the transfer window re-opens)	RW	(England) David Ajiboye	(England) Sutton United	End of Season	
6 January 2023	AM	(England) Kellan Hickinson	(England) St Ives Town	6 March 2023	
20 January 2023	CF	(England) Lewis Darlington	(England) Corby Town	17 February 2023	
20 January 2023	GK	(England) Matthew Laycock	(England) Yaxley	17 February 2023	
23 January 2023	CB	(England) Sam Dreyer	(England) Bedford Town	End of Season	
24 January 2023	RB	(Hungary) János Bodnár	(England) Barwell	21 February 2023	
31 January 2023	LB	(England) Joe Tomlinson	(England) Swindon Town	End of Season	
21 February 2023	RW	(Ghana) Johnson Gyamfi	(England) Peterborough Sports	End of Season	
21 February 2023	MF	(England) Harry Thomas	(England) Corby Town	21 March 2023	
1 March 2023	MF	(England) Roddy McGlinchey	(England) AFC Rushden & Diamonds	End of Season	
23 March 2023	CB	(England) Emmanuel Fernandez	(England) Barnet	End of Season	
23 March 2023	GK	(England) William Lakin	(England) Kettering Town	End of Season	
23 March 2023	CB	(England) Charlie O'Connell	(England) Woking	End of Season	

== Pre-season and friendlies ==
On May 31, the Posh announced their first pre-season friendly, against Scunthorpe United. Four days later, an away trip to King's Lynn Town was confirmed. A home friendly against Luton Town was next to be added to the schedule. On 10 June, a fourth friendly, against Stevenage was added. A week later, a second home pre-season friendly was confirmed, against Hull City. A sixth addition to the pre-season schedule was confirmed against Barnet. During their pre-season camp in Portugal, they will face Leyton Orient in Lagos. A late addition to the diary, against Deeping Rangers was also confirmed.

Win Draw Loss Fixtures

8 July 2022 Friendly	Leyton Orient	0–3	Peterborough United	Lagos, Portugal
11:00 WEST	Sargeant (yellow card) 81'	Report	Jones 37'; Randall 72'; Marriott 81'	Stadium: Estadio Municipal de Lagos; Attendance: 50 (approx)

12 July 2022 Friendly	Deeping Rangers	0–4	Peterborough United	Market Deeping
19:30 BST		Report	Randall 34'; Poku 75'; Clarke-Harris 84', 90'	Stadium: The Haydon Whitham Stadium; Attendance: 1,044

13 July 2022 Friendly	Stevenage	1–1	Peterborough United	Stevenage
19:30 BST	Norris 18' (pen.)	Report	Clarke-Harris 49'	Stadium: Lamex Stadium; Attendance: 830

16 July 2022 Friendly	Barnet	2–2	Peterborough United	Canons Park
15:00 BST	Mason-Clarke 44'; De Havilland 48'	Report	Kyprianou 67'; J.Taylor 105'	Stadium: The Hive Stadium

19 July 2022 Friendly	King's Lynn Town	1–0	Peterborough United XI	King's Lynn
19:30 BST	Walker 80'	Report		Stadium: The Walks

19 July 2022 Friendly	Peterborough United	0–2	Luton Town	Peterborough
19:45 BST		Report	Woodrow 27'; Cornick 82'	Stadium: Weston Homes Stadium

23 July 2022 Friendly	Scunthorpe United	1–1	Peterborough United	Scunthorpe
15:00 BST	Taft 70'	Report	O'Malley 57'	Stadium: Glanford Park

23 July 2022 Friendly	Peterborough United	3–0	Hull City	Peterborough
16:00 BST	Szmodics 25', 49'; Randall 47'	Report		Stadium: Westom Homes Stadium

== Competitions ==
=== Overall record ===
Competition	First match	Last match	Starting round	Record							
Competition	First match	Last match	Starting round	Pld	W	D	L	GF	GA	GD	Win %
League One	30 July 2022	06 May 2023	Matchday 1	48	25	5	18	80	59	+21	52.08
FA Cup	TBC	TBC	First round	3	1	1	1	4	3	+1	33.33
EFL Cup	10 August 2022	23 August 2022	First round	2	1	0	1	2	1	+1	50.00
EFL Trophy	30 August 2022	TBC	Group stage	4	1	1	2	7	7	+0	25.00
Total				57	28	7	22	93	70	+23	49.12

Last updated: 22/10/2022
Source: [ Soccerway]

=== League One ===
==== League table ====
Pos	Team	Pld	W	D	L	GF	GA	GD	Pts	Promotion, qualification or relegation
3	Sheffield Wednesday (O, P)	46	28	12	6	81	37	+44	96	Qualification for League One play-offs
4	Barnsley	46	26	8	12	80	47	+33	86	Qualification for League One play-offs
5	Bolton Wanderers	46	23	12	11	62	36	+26	81	Qualification for League One play-offs
6	Peterborough United	46	24	5	17	75	54	+21	77	Qualification for League One play-offs
7	Derby County	46	21	13	12	67	46	+21	76	
8	Portsmouth	46	17	19	10	61	50	+11	70	
9	Wycombe Wanderers	46	20	9	17	59	51	+8	69	

Source: EFL Official Website
Rules for classification: 1) Points; 2) Goal difference; 3) Number of goals scored; 4) Head-to-head results; 5) Wins; 6) Away goals; 7) Penalty points (sec 9.5); 8) 12-point sending off offences
(O) Play-off winners; (P) Promoted

==== Results summary ====
Overall								Home						Away					
Pld	W	D	L	GF	GA	GD	Pts	W	D	L	GF	GA	GD	W	D	L	GF	GA	GD
46	24	5	17	75	54	+21	77	13	4	6	38	25	+13	11	1	11	37	29	+8

Last updated: 7 May 2023.
Source: [ Soccerway]

==== Results by round ====
Round	1	2	3	4	5	6	7	8	9	10	11	12	13	14	15	16	17	18	19	20	21	22	23	24	25	26	27	28	29	30	31	32	33	34	35	36	37	38	39	40	41	42	43	44	45	46
Ground	A	H	A	H	H	A	A	H	A	H	A	H	H	A	A	H	H	A	A	H	A	A	H	H	A	H	A	H	A	A	H	H	A	H	H	A	A	H	H	A	H	A	A	H	H	A
Result	W	W	L	W	W	L	L	L	L	W	W	D	W	L	W	W	W	L	L	L	L	D	W	L	W	W	W	L	L	W	W	D	L	W	L	W	W	W	D	W	W	L	W	L	D	W
Position	2	1	4	2	2	4	6	7	10	8	7	7	4	5	4	4	4	4	4	6	6	8	7	8	7	7	7	9	9	9	9	8	9	8	9	8	7	7	6	6	5	6	5	7	7	6

Updated to match(es) played on 7 May 2023. Source: [ Soccerway]
A = Away; H = Home; W = Win; D = Draw; L = Loss; P = Postponed

==== Matches ====
Win Draw Loss Fixtures

On 23 June, the league fixtures were announced.

30 July 2022 1	Cheltenham Town	2–3	Peterborough United	Cheltenham
15:00 BST	Kent 30' (o.g.); May 39'; Jackson (yellow card) 48'; Freestone (yellow card) 89'	Report	Fuchs (yellow card) 45+1'; Marriott 59'; Kent (yellow card) 61'; Clarke-Harris 66', 72'	Stadium: Completely-Suzuki Stadium; Attendance: 4,425; Referee: Tom Nield

6 August 2022 2	Peterborough United	3–0	Morecambe	Peterborough
15:00 BST	Ward 9'; B.Thompson 43'; Marriott (yellow card) 64'; Kyprianou 72'	Report	Melbourne (yellow card) 42'	Stadium: Weston Homes Stadium; Attendance: 7,691; Referee: Dean Whitestone

13 August 2022 3	Plymouth Argyle	2–0	Peterborough United	Plymouth
15:00 BST	Azaz 30', (yellow card) 84'; Hardie 65' (pen.); Wilson (yellow card) 82'	Report	Thompson (yellow card) 48'; Knight (yellow card) 78'	Stadium: Home Park; Attendance: 13,307; Referee: Tom Reeves

16 August 2022 4	Peterborough United	2–0	Sheffield Wednesday	Peterborough
19:45 BST	Kent (yellow card) 38'; Clarke-Harris 65'; Taylor 75'	Report	James (red card) 34'; Vaulks (yellow card) 51'; Ihiekwe (yellow card) 61'	Stadium: Weston Homes Stadium; Attendance: 11,169; Referee: James Oldham

20 August 2022 5	Peterborough United	4–0	Lincoln City	Peterborough
15:00 BST	Marriott 21', 50'; Clarke-Harris 29' (pen.), 43'; Kent (yellow card) 35'	Report	O'Connor (yellow card) 28'; Garrick (yellow card) 40'	Stadium: Weston Homes Stadium; Attendance: 9,040; Referee: Rebecca Welch

27 August 2022 6	Derby County	2–1	Peterborough United	Derby
15:00 BST	Stearman (yellow card) 64'; Knight 88'; McGoldrick 90+2'	Report	Taylor (yellow card) 26'; Thompson (yellow card) 30' (yellow-red card) 56'; Burrows (yellow card) 41'; Knight 69'	Stadium: Pride Park Stadium; Attendance: 26,414; Referee: Bobby Madden

3 September 2022 7	Portsmouth	2–1	Peterborough United	Milton
15:00 BST	Scarlett 38', 70'; Rafferty (yellow card) 61'; Robertson (yellow card) 90+5'	Report	Marriott 5'; Kent (yellow card) 64'	Stadium: Fratton Park; Attendance: 18,168; Referee: Sam Barrott

10 September 2022	Peterborough United	Postponed	Forest Green Rovers	Peterborough
15:00 BST				Stadium: Weston Homes Stadium
Note: Fixture was postponed as a mark of respect following the passing of Queen Elizabeth II.

13 September 2022 8	Peterborough United	0–1	Fleetwood Town	Peterborough
19:45 BST	N. Thompson (yellow card) 2'; B. Thompson (yellow card) 59'; Taylor (yellow card) 66'	Report	Rooney (yellow card) 11'; Vela 23'; Earl (yellow card) 86'	Stadium: Weston Homes Stadium; Attendance: 6,087; Referee: Will Finnie

17 September 2022 9	Bolton Wanderers	1–0	Peterborough United	Horwich
15:00 BST	Iredale (yellow card) 35'; Johnston (yellow card) 45+4'; Afolayan 86'; Williams (yellow card) 90+1'; Sadlier (yellow card) 90+2'	Report	Fuchs (yellow card) 25'; Knight (yellow card) 45+4'; Kyprianou (yellow card) 90'	Stadium: University of Bolton Stadium; Attendance: 17,016; Referee: Carl Brook

24 September 2022 10	Peterborough United	3–0	Port Vale	Peterborough
15:00 BST	Clarke-Harris 26', 36'; Ward 73'	Report	Massey (yellow card) 47'; Harrison (yellow card) 51'; Jones (yellow card) 79'	Stadium: Weston Homes Stadium; Attendance: 7,235; Referee: Anthony Backhouse

1 October 2022 11	Milton Keynes Dons	2–3	Peterborough United	Denbigh
15:00 BST	Robson (yellow card) 45'; Devoy (yellow card) 68'; Johnson (yellow card) 82'; Harvie 90'; Smith 90+1'	Report	Clarke-Harris 3'; Fuchs (yellow card) 32'; Poku 36'; Jones 54'	Stadium: Stadium:mk; Attendance: 8,963; Referee: Ollie Yates

8 October 2022 12	Peterborough United	1–1	Burton Albion	Peterborough
15:00 BST	Clarke-Harris 47'	Report	Brayford (yellow card) 60'; Adeboyejo 75'	Stadium: Weston Homes Stadium; Attendance: 8,032; Referee: Seb Stockbridge

11 October 2022 13	Peterborough United	4–1	Forest Green Rovers	Peterborough
19:45 BST	Thompson 30'; Clarke-Harris 39'; Jones 46'; Burrows 58'; Taylor (yellow card) 90+2'	Report	March 35'; Boyes (yellow card) 75'	Stadium: Weston Homes Stadium; Attendance: 6,750; Referee: Darren Handley

15 October 2022 14	Wycombe Wanderers	3–1	Peterborough United	High Wycombe
15:00 BST	Forino-Joseph (yellow card) 12'; McCleary 45'; Vokes (yellow card) 57' (goal) 74'; Mehmeti 90+5'	Report	Burrows 22'	Stadium: Adams Park; Attendance: 5,085; Referee: Charles Breakspear

22 October 2022 15	Oxford United	1–2	Peterborough United	Littlemore
15:00 BST	Bodin 52'; Taylor (red card) 57'; Browne (yellow card) 62'; Moore (yellow card) 63'; Goodrham (yellow card) 86'	Report	Taylor 7'; Kyprianou (yellow card) 23'; Poku 31'; Edwards (yellow card) 57'; Butler (yellow card) 90+1'	Stadium: The Kassam Stadium; Attendance: 8,210; Referee: Andy Woolmer

25 October 2022 16	Peterborough United	3–1	Accrington Stanley	Peterborough
19:45 BST	Fuchs (yellow card) 23'; Mason-Clark 33'; Poku 51'; Taylor (yellow card) 56'; Clarke-Harris 59'	Report	Coyle (yellow card) 10'; Rodgers 25' (yellow card) 90+3'; Tharme (yellow card) 63'; Astley (yellow card) 65'	Stadium: Weston Homes Stadium; Attendance: 7,181; Referee: Craig Hicks

29 October 2022 17	Peterborough United	1–0	Cambridge United	Peterborough
15:00 BST	Jones 18' (o.g.); Kent (yellow card) 39'	Report	Simper (yellow card) 41'; Williams (yellow card) 72'; O'Neil (yellow card) 81'	Stadium: Weston Homes Stadium; Attendance: 12,766; Referee: Scott Oldham

12 November 2022 18	Exeter City	3–2	Peterborough United	Exeter
15:00 GMT	Dieng 27' (yellow card) 55'; Sparkes (yellow card) 65'; Nombe 86'; Brown 90+1' (yellow card) 90+2'	Report	Clarke-Harris 40'; Mason-Clark 81'	Stadium: St James Park; Attendance: 6,489; Referee: Tom Reeves

19 November 2022 19	Bristol Rovers	1–0	Peterborough United	Horfield
15:00 GMT	Thomas (yellow card) 51'; Sinclair 53'	Report	Edwards (red card) 75'	Stadium: Memorial Stadium; Attendance: 8,635; Referee: Peter Wright

2 December 2022 20	Peterborough United	1–2	Barnsley	Peterborough
19:45 GMT	Taylor 21'	Report	Connell 11'; Phillips (yellow card) 38', (goal) 61'; Kane (yellow card) 84'	Stadium: Weston Homes Stadium; Attendance: 7,046; Referee: Sam Allison

10 December 2022 21	Ipswich Town	2–1	Peterborough United	Ipswich
12:30 GMT	Chaplin 21', 58'; Morsy (yellow card) 62'; Vincent-Young (yellow card) 66'; Jackson (yellow card) 71'	Report	Kent 31'	Stadium: Portman Road; Attendance: 24,849; Referee: Ollie Yates

17 December 2022	Peterborough United	Postponed	Shrewsbury Town	Peterborough
15:00 GMT				Stadium: Weston Homes Stadium
Note: Fixture was postponed due to a frozen pitch.

26 December 2022 22	Charlton Athletic	1–1	Peterborough United	Charlton
15:00 GMT	Dobson (yellow card) 44'; Leaburn 49'	Report	Clarke-Harris 65'	Stadium: The Valley; Attendance: 13,816; Referee: Darren Drysdale

29 December 2022 23	Peterborough United	2–0	Milton Keynes Dons	Peterborough
19:45 GMT	Burrows (yellow card) 27'; Ward 38'; Jones 48', (yellow card) 85'; Clarke-Harris (penalty missed) 62'; Poku (yellow card) 73'	Report	Grigg (yellow card) 30'; Jules (yellow card) 61'	Stadium: Weston Homes Stadium; Attendance: 8,391; Referee: David Rock

1 January 2023 24	Peterborough United	0–3	Wycombe Wanderers	Peterborough
15:00 GMT		Report	Wing 15', 75'; Tafazolli 67'	Stadium: Weston Homes Stadium; Attendance: 7,483; Referee: Sam Barrott

16 January 2023 25	Port Vale	0–2	Peterborough United	Burslem
20:00 GMT		Report	Mason-Clark 56', 64'; Poku (yellow card) 77'	Stadium: Vale Park; Attendance: 5,109; Referee: Peter Wright

21 January 2023	Peterborough United	Postponed	Charlton Athletic	Peterborough
15:00 GMT				Stadium: Weston Homes Stadium
Note: Fixture was postponed due to a frozen pitch.

24 January 2023	Burton Albion	Postponed	Peterborough United	Burton upon Trent
19:45 GMT				Stadium: Pirelli Stadium
Note: Fixture was postponed due to a frozen pitch.

28 January 2023 26	Peterborough United	2–1	Portsmouth	Peterborough
15:00 GMT	Clarke-Harris 18', 44' (pen.), (yellow card) 50'; Kyprianou (yellow card) 31'	Report	Thompson (yellow card) 58'; Pack (yellow card) 69'; Thompson 87' (o.g.)	Stadium: Weston Homes Stadium; Attendance: 8,909; Referee: Bobby Madley

4 February 2023 27	Forest Green Rovers	0–2	Peterborough United	Nailsworth
15:00 GMT	Godwin-Malife (yellow card) 32'; O'Keeffe (yellow card) 39'; Cooper (yellow card) 51'; Onyango (yellow card) 84'	Report	Thompson (yellow card) 50'; Clarke-Harris 72' (pen.); Norris (yellow card) 90'; Kyprianou 90+5'	Stadium: The Bolt New Lawn; Attendance: 3,273; Referee: Ben Toner

11 February 2023 28	Peterborough United	0–5	Bolton Wanderers	Peterborough
15:00 GMT	Kyprianou (yellow card) 13'; Poku (yellow card) 35'; Taylor (yellow card) 54'	Report	Santos 12', (yellow card) 55', (goal) 77'; Charles 42' (pen.), (yellow card) 45+1', (goal) 47', 51' (pen.); Shoretire (yellow card) 56'	Stadium: Weston Homes Stadium; Attendance: 9,247; Referee: Lee Swabey

14 February 2023 29	Fleetwood Town	1–0	Peterborough United	Fleetwood
19:45 GMT	Omochere 20'; Mendes Gomes (yellow card) 73'; Lynch (yellow card) 90+3'	Report	Thompson (yellow card) 57'; Knight (yellow card) 90+3'	Stadium: Highbury Stadium; Attendance: 3,037; Referee: Martin Wood

18 February 2023 30	Morecambe	0–3	Peterborough United	Morecambe
15:00 GMT	Bedeau (yellow card) 52'	Report	Taylor 12'; Ward 22'; Poku 29'; Kyprianou (yellow card) 43'	Stadium: Globe Arena; Attendance: 4,172; Referee: Darren Handley

25 February 2023 31	Peterborough United	5–2	Plymouth Argyle	Peterborough
15:00 GMT	Clarke-Harris 16' (pen.), 64'; Kyprianou 19' (yellow card) 21'; Burrows 54'; Taylor 78'	Report	Earley 36'; Cosgrove (yellow card) 41'; Wilson (yellow card) 45+3'; Gillesphey 58'	Stadium: Weston Homes Stadium; Attendance: 8,365; Referee: Scott Oldham

28 February 2023 32	Peterborough United	0–0	Charlton Athletic	Peterborough
19:45 GMT	Knight (red card) 54'; Taylor (yellow card) 55'	Report	Rak-Sakyi (yellow card) 54'; Dobson (yellow card) 83'	Stadium: Weston Homes Stadium; Attendance: 8,219 (1,235 Charlton Athletic fans); Referee: Andrew Kitchen

5 March 2023 33	Sheffield Wednesday	1–0	Peterborough United	Owlerton
15:00 GMT	Flint (yellow card) 34'; Bannan (yellow card) 40'; Thompson 60' (o.g.); Gregory (yellow card) 90'	Report	Edwards (yellow card) 89'	Stadium: Hillsborough Stadium; Attendance: 26,984; Referee: Anthony Backhouse

7 March 2023 34	Peterborough United	2–1	Shrewsbury Town	Peterborough
19:45 GMT	Clarke-Harris 17'; Kyprianou (yellow card) 67'; Kent 87'; Norburn (yellow card) 90+1'; Norris (yellow card) 90+2'	Report	Flanagan 21', (yellow card) 62'; Pyke (yellow card) 38'; Saydee (yellow card) 78'	Stadium: Weston Homes Stadium; Attendance: 7,388; Referee: Declan Bourne

11 March 2023 35	Peterborough United	0–3	Cheltenham Town	Peterborough
15:00 GMT	Kent (yellow card) 72'; Taylor (yellow card) 82'; Poku (yellow card) 86'	Report	Bradbury 15'; May 21', 74'; Bonds (yellow card) 53'; Broom (yellow card) 67'	Stadium: Weston Homes Stadium; Attendance: 8,947; Referee: Alan Young

14 March 2023 36	Burton Albion	2–5	Peterborough United	Burton upon Trent
19:45 GMT	Powell 28'; Smith 55'; Hughes (yellow card) 67'		Clarke Harris 12', 51'; Mason-Clark 19'; Burrows 38'; Ward 64'	Stadium: Pirelli Stadium; Attendance: 2,383; Referee: Craig Hicks

18 March 2023 37	Lincoln City	0–3	Peterborough United	Lincoln
13:00 GMT	Mandroiu (yellow card) 22'; O'Connor (yellow card) 59'		Clarke-Harris 28'; Burrows (yellow card) 52'; Taylor 67'; Norburn (yellow card) 73'; Ward 83'	Stadium: LNER Stadium; Attendance: 9,530; Referee: Robert Lewis

25 March 2023 38	Peterborough United	2–0	Derby County	Peterborough
15:00 GMT	Mason-Clark 52'; Kent (yellow card) 56'; Taylor (yellow card) 75'; Ogbeta 83'; B.Thompson (yellow card) 90'	Report	White (yellow card) 75'	Stadium: Weston Homes Stadium; Attendance: 12,060; Referee: Carl Brook

1 April 2023 39	Peterborough United	0–0	Oxford United	Peterborough
15:00 BST		Report	Joseph (yellow card) 77'	Stadium: Weston Homes Stadium; Attendance: 11,199; Referee: Thomas Kirk

7 April 2023 40	Shrewsbury Town	0–3	Peterborough United	Shrewsbury
15:00 BST	Phillips (yellow card) 66'; Street (yellow card) 71'	Report	Clarke-Harris 30' (pen.); Mason-Clark 51'; Norris (yellow card) 61'; Taylor 83'	Stadium: Montgomery Waters Meadow; Attendance: 6,930; Referee: Carl Boyeson

10 April 2023 41	Peterborough United	3–1	Exeter City	Peterborough
15:00 BST	Hartridge 8' (o.g); Mason-Clark 43'; Clarke-Harris 70'; Poku (yellow card) 85'	Report	Kite (yellow card) 5'; Harper 46' (yellow card) 90+1'	Stadium: Weston Homes Stadium; Attendance: 8,261; Referee: Charles Breakspear

15 April 2023 42	Cambridge United	2–0	Peterborough United	Cambridge
12:30 BST	Dunk 45+2'; Smith 66'; Lankester (yellow card) 71'	Report	Kent (yellow card) 54'; Taylor (yellow card) 90+2'	Stadium: Abbey Stadium; Attendance: 7,711; Referee: Ross Joyce

18 April 2023 43	Accrington Stanley	1–2	Peterborough United	Accrington
19:45 BST	Rodgers (yellow card) 61'; McConville 87'	Report	Clarke-Harris 23'; Mason-Clark 43'; Norburn (yellow card) 53'; Edwards (yellow card) 66'; Butler (yellow card) 80'	Stadium: Wham Stadium; Attendance: 2,064; Referee: Tom Reeves

22 April 2023 44	Peterborough United	0–3	Ipswich Town	Peterborough
15:00 BST	Norburn (yellow card) 11'	Report	Burns 17', (yellow card) 74'; Morsy (yellow card) 44'; Chaplin 57', (yellow card) 69'; Ladapo 82'	Stadium: Weston Homes Stadium; Attendance: 12,785; Referee: Gavin Ward

29 April 2023 45	Peterborough United	0–0	Bristol Rovers	Peterborough
15:00 BST	Norburn (yellow card) 34'; Butler (yellow card) 51'; Taylor (yellow card) 90+1'	Report	Gibbons (yellow card) 44'; Bogarde (yellow card) 45+3'; Finley (yellow card) 45+4'; Loft (yellow card) 51'; Balcombe (yellow card) 81'	Stadium: Weston Homes Stadium; Attendance: 9,494; Referee: Darren Drysdale

7 May 2023 46	Barnsley	0–2	Peterborough United	Barnsley
12:00 BST		Report	Clarke-Harris 6'; Poku (yellow card) 51'; Taylor 76'	Stadium: Oakwell; Attendance: 14,419; Referee: Scott Oldham

==== Play-offs ====
Peterborough United finished sixth in the regular 2022–23 EFL League One season, so were drawn against third-placed Sheffield Wednesday in the play-off semi-final. The first leg took place at the Weston Homes Stadium and the second leg took place at Hillsborough.

12 May 2023 Semi-final, first leg	Peterborough United	4–0	Sheffield Wednesday	Peterborough
20:00 BST	Kent (yellow card) 15'; Taylor 20'; Ward 36'; Poku 50' (yellow card) 64'; Clarke-Harris 82'	Report	Flint (yellow card) 54'; Ihiekwe (yellow card) 55'	Stadium: Weston Homes Stadium; Attendance: 12,965; Referee: Anthony Backhouse
Note: Live on Sky Sports

18 May 2023 Semi-final, second leg	Sheffield Wednesday	5–1 (5–5 agg.) (5–3 p)	Peterborough United	Owlerton, Sheffield
20:00 BST	Palmer (yellow card) 6'; Smith 9', pen.' Gregory 25'; Bannan (yellow card) 47'; James 71'; Palmer 90+8'; Ihiekwe (yellow card) 99'; Paterson 112'; Hunt (yellow card) 120'	Report	Kyprianou (yellow card) 16'; Butler (yellow card) 71'; Taylor (yellow card) 87'; Gregory 105' (o.g.)	Stadium: Hillsborough Stadium; Attendance: 31,835; Referee: David Webb
	Penalties
	Smith (penalty scored); Vaulks (penalty scored); Bannan (penalty scored); Windass (penalty scored); Hunt (penalty scored)		Clarke-Harris (penalty scored); Butler (penalty missed); Norburn (penalty scored); Tshimanga (penalty scored)
Note: Live on Sky Sports

=== FA Cup ===
Peterborough were drawn at home to Salford City in the first round and away to Shrewsbury Town in the second round.

Win Draw Loss Fixtures

5 November 2022 First round	Peterborough United	0–0	Salford City	Peterborough
15:00 BST	Marriott (yellow card) 36'	Report	Galbraith (yellow card) 53'	Stadium: Weston Homes Stadium; Attendance: 4,031; Referee: Tom Nield

16 November 2022 First round replay	Salford City	0–3	Peterborough United	Salford
19:45 GMT	Watt (yellow card) 56'; Hendry (yellow card) 81'	Report	Mason-Clark 39'; Marriott 78', 83'	Stadium: Moor Lane; Attendance: 1,059; Referee: Ben Toner

26 November 2022 Second round	Shrewsbury Town	3–1	Peterborough United	Shrewsbury
15:00 GMT	Bayliss 2'; Street (yellow card) 27'; Saydee (yellow card) 30'; Pennington 35'; Leahy 45+7' (pen.); Shipley (yellow card) 88'; Moore (yellow card) 90+2'	Report	Poku 13'; Fuchs (yellow card) 34'; Butler (yellow card) 64'; Kent (yellow card) 79'; Thompson (yellow card) 82'	Stadium: Montgomery Wates Meadow; Attendance: 2,895; Referee: Simon Mather

=== EFL Cup ===
Win Draw Loss Fixtures

The Posh were drawn away to Plymouth Argyle in the first round and to Stevenage in the second round.

10 August 2022 First round	Plymouth Argyle	0–2	Peterborough United	Plymouth
19:45 BST	Wilson (yellow card) 49'; Azaz (yellow card) 67'	Report	Jones 28'; Knight (yellow card) 89'; J.Taylor 90+3'	Stadium: Home Park; Attendance: 6,098; Referee: Alan Young

23 August 2022 Second round	Stevenage	1–0	Peterborough United	Stevenage
19:45 BST	Taylor (yellow card) 70'; Reid 90+3'	Report	Knight (yellow card) 64'	Stadium: Lamex Stadium; Attendance: 2,292; Referee: Christopher Pollard

=== EFL Trophy ===
On 20 June, the initial Group stage draw was made, grouping Peterborough United with Stevenage and Wycombe Wanderers. Three days later, Tottenham Hotspur joined Southern Group D. In the second round, The Posh were drawn away to Chelsea U21.

Pos	Div	Team	Pld	W	PW	PL	L	GF	GA	GD	Pts	Qualification
1	L2	Stevenage	3	3	0	0	0	6	1	+5	9	Advance to Round 2
2	L1	Peterborough United	3	1	0	1	1	5	3	+2	4	Advance to Round 2
3	L1	Wycombe Wanderers	3	0	2	0	1	1	4	−3	4	
4	ACA	Tottenham Hotspur U21	3	0	0	1	2	0	4	−4	1	

Source: EFL.com

Win Draw Loss Fixtures

30 August 2022 Group stage	Peterborough United	1–2	Stevenage	Peterborough
19:30 BST	Jones 9'; Knight (yellow card) 50'	Report	Taylor 18'; Reeves (yellow card) 32'; Earley (yellow card) 50'; Piergianni 84'	Stadium: Weston Homes Stadium; Attendance: 2,420; Referee: Robert Lewis

20 September 2022 Group stage	Peterborough United	3–0	Tottenham Hotspur U21	Peterborough
19:30 BST	Knight 19'; Jones 32'; Fuchs (yellow card) 49'; Marriott 51'	Report		Stadium: Weston Homes Stadium; Attendance: 1,898; Referee: Darren Drysdale

18 October 2022 Group stage	Wycombe Wanderers	1–1 (4–3 p)	Peterborough United	High Wycombe
19:00 BST	Horgan 60'; Forino-Joseph (yellow card) 79'	Report	Clarke-Harris 83'; Ward (yellow card) 90+7'	Stadium: Adams Park; Attendance: 567; Referee: Paul Howard
	Penalties
	Horgan (penalty scored); Wakely (penalty missed); Obita (penalty scored); Kaikai (penalty scored); Wing (penalty missed); Freeman (penalty scored)		Clarke-Harris (penalty scored); Watts (penalty missed); Tomlinson (penalty scored); Burrows (penalty scored); Ward (penalty missed); Edwards (penalty missed)

22 November 2022 Second round	Peterborough United	2–4	Chelsea U21	Fulham
19:30 GMT	Clarke-Harris 26'; Kyprianou (yellow card) 50'; Taylor 61', (yellow card) 72'; Thompson (yellow card) 65'; Jones (yellow card) 82'	Report	Mothersille 18', 45+1'; Casadei 23'; Elliott 75'	Stadium: Stamford Bridge; Attendance: 1,523; Referee: Christopher Pollard
