= 2024–25 Queens Park Rangers F.C. season =

English football club season

Queens Park Rangers
2024–25 season
- Owner: Ruben Gnanalingam, Richard Reilly, Lakshmi Mittal
- Chairman: Lee Hoos
- Manager: Martí Cifuentes
- Stadium: Loftus Road
- Championship: 15th
- FA Cup: Third round
- EFL Cup: Third round
- Top goalscorer: League: Michael Frey (8); All: Michael Frey (9)
- Highest home attendance: 17,457 vs. Leeds United (15 March, Championship)
- Lowest home attendance: 13,407 vs. Hull City (5 November, Championship)
- Average home league attendance: 15,856
- Biggest win: 4-0 vs Derby County, Championship, 14 February 2025
- Biggest defeat: 0-5 vs Burnley, Championship, 26 April 2025
Home colours	Away colours	Third colours

The 2024–25 season is the 143rd season in the history of Queens Park Rangers Football Club and their tenth consecutive season in the Championship. In addition to the domestic league, the club would also participate in the FA Cup, and the EFL Cup.

== Kit ==
Supplier: Erreà / Sponsor: CopyBet

=== Kit information ===
QPR agreed a multi-year partnership with Erreà as the official technical kit suppliers, the 2024–25 season will be the eighth year of the deal. The kits will be 100 percent bespoke designs for the duration of the deal. On 8 December 2022 QPR announced that the kit deal with Erreà had been extended until the end of the 2025/26 season.

On 25 April 2024 the 2024–25 season home shirt was unveiled with CopyBet as the main shirt sponsor on a two-year deal.

Home	Away	Third

== Current squad ==
As of 3 May 2025

No.	Name	Nat	Position	Since	Date of birth (age)	Signed from	Contract expires	Games	Goals
Goalkeepers
1	Paul Nardi	(France)	GK	2024	18 May 1994 (age 32)	(Belgium) Gent	2026	45	0
13	Joe Walsh	(England)	GK	2021	1 April 2002 (age 24)	(England) Gillingham	2025	7	0
Defenders
3	Jimmy Dunne	(Republic of Ireland)	CB/ RB	2021	19 October 1997 (age 29)	(England) Burnley	2025	163	11
5	Steve Cook	(England)	CB	2023	19 April 1991 (age 35)	(England) Nottingham Forest	2025	69	3
6	Jake Clarke-Salter	(England)	CB	2022	22 September 1997 (age 29)	(England) Chelsea	2026	63	1
15	Morgan Fox	(Wales)	CB/LB	2023	21 September 1993 (age 33)	(England) Stoke City	2025	48	2
16	Liam Morrison	(Scotland)	CB	2024	7 April 2003 (age 23)	(Germany) Bayern Munich	-	21	0
17	Ronnie Edwards	(England)	CB	2024	28 March 2003 (age 23)	(England) Southampton	Loan	22	2
20	Harrison Ashby	(Scotland)	RB/LB	2024	14 November 2001 (age 24)	(England) Newcastle Unnited	Loan	31	0
22	Kenneth Paal	(Suriname)	LB	2022	24 June 1997 (age 29)	(Netherlands) PEC Zwolle	2025	130	6
23	Hevertton Santos	(Brazil)	RB/LB	2024	1 February 2001 (age 25)	(Portugal) Estrela da Amadora	-	9	1
Midfielders
4	Jack Colback	(England)	DM/CM	2023	24 October 1989 (age 37)	(England) Nottingham Forest	2025	55	4
7	Karamoko Dembélé	(Scotland)	RW	2024	22 February 2003 (age 23)	(France) Stade Brestois 29	Loan	25	3
8	Sam Field	(England)	CM/DM	2021	8 May 1998 (age 28)	(England) West Bromwich Albion	2026	179	12
10	Ilias Chair	(Morocco)	AM/RM/LM	2017	30 October 1997 (age 29)	(Belgium) Lierse	-	264	37
11	Paul Smyth	(Northern Ireland)	RW/LW	2023	10 September 1997 (age 29)	(England) Leyton Orient	2026	115	7
14	Koki Saito	(Japan)	LW	2024	10 August 2001 (age 25)	(Belgium) Lommel S.K.	Loan	42	3
19	Elijah Dixon-Bonner	(England)	CM/DM	2022	1 January 2001 (age 25)	(England) Liverpool	2025	33	0
21	Kieran Morgan	(England)	DM/CM	2024	17 March 2006 (age 20)	(England) Tottenham Hotspur	-	31	1
24	Nicolas Madsen	(Denmark)	CM	2024	17 March 2000 (age 26)	(Belgium) Westerlo	2029	34	3
25	Lucas Andersen	(Denmark)	AM/LW/RW	2024	13 September 1994 (age 32)	(Denmark) AaB	2025	51	3
27	Daniel Bennie	(Australia)	AM/LW	2024	14 April 2006 (age 20)	(Australia) Perth Glory	-	13	0
36	Emmerson Sutton	(England)	CM	2023	28 December 2006 (age 19)	(England) Queens Park Rangers Academy	-	2	0
40	Jonathan Varane	(Martinique)	CM/DM	2024	9 September 2001 (age 25)	(Spain) Sporting Gijón	2028	43	1
47	Yang Min-hyeok	(South Korea)	RW	2025	16 April 2006 (age 20)	(England) Tottenham	Loan	14	2
	Harvey Vale	(England)	AM	2022	11 September 2003 (age 23)	(England) Chelsea	-	0	0
Forwards
12	Michael Frey	(Switzerland)	CF	2024	19 July 1994 (age 32)	(Belgium) Royal Antwerp	2026	40	10
18	Žan Celar	(Slovenia)	CF	2023	14 March 1999 (age 27)	(Switzerland) Lugano	-	22	2
26	Rayan Kolli	(Algeria)	CF/RW/LW	2023	10 February 2005 (age 21)	(England) Queens Park Rangers Academy	-	32	5
28	Alfie Lloyd	(England)	CF	2021	30 April 2003 (age 23)	(England) Yeovil Town	-	31	2
Out on Loan
-	Murphy Mahoney	(England)	GK	2012	27 December 2001 (age 24)	(England) Wycombe Wanderers	2024	2	0
-	Ziyad Larkeche	(France)	LB/CB	2023	19 September 2002 (age 24)	(England) Fulham	2026	22	0
-	Taylor Richards	(England)	AM/RM/LM	2022	4 December 2000 (age 25)	(England) Brighton & Hove Albion	2026	21	0
-	Charlie Kelman	(United States)	CF	2020	2 November 2001 (age 25)	(England) Southend United	2024	26	0
Left During the season
	Lyndon Dykes	(Scotland)	CF	2020	7 October 1995 (age 31)	(Scotland) Livingston	2026	165	37

== Development squad ==
As of 5 August 2024

No.	Name	Nat	Position	Since	Date of birth (age)	Signed from	Contract expires	Games	Goals
Goalkeepers
32	Matteo Salamon	(Brazil)	GK	2015	1 April 2002 (age 24)	(England) Queens Park Rangers Academy	-	0	0
Defenders
-	Rocco Friel	(Scotland)	RB	2024	14 October 2006 (age 20)	(Scotland) Heart of Midlothian	-	0	0
-	Jack McDowell	(England)	CB	2024	9 October 2005 (age 21)	(England) Aston Villa	-	0	0
-	Casey Shann	(Slovakia)	LB	2021	2 January 2004 (age 22)	(England) Brighton & Hove Albion	-	0	0
Midfielders
29	Alfie Tuck	(Wales)	CM	2022	9 May 2006 (age 20)	(England) Queens Park Rangers Academy	-	0	0
30	Lorent Talla	(Kosovo)	DM/CM	2023	1 January 2005 (age 21)	(England) Queens Park Rangers Academy	-	0	0
34	Harry Murphy	(Republic of Ireland)	AM	2022	21 January 2004 (age 22)	(England) Queens Park Rangers Academy	-	0	0
35	Kieran Petrie	(England)	AM/RW	2023	16 December 2004 (age 21)	(England) Queens Park Rangers Academy	-	0	0
-	Alexander Aoraha	(Iraq)	CM/DM	2021	17 January 2003 (age 23)	(England) Queens Park Rangers Academy	-	0	0
Forwards
-	Rohan Vaughan	(England)	CF	2024	3 October 2005 (age 21)	(England) Burnley	-	0	0

== Transfers ==
=== In ===
Date	Pos.	Player	From	Fee	Ref.
1 July 2024 (Note: The transfer was announced on 30 May, and became official on 1 July once his Perth Glory contract expired)	LW	(Australia) Daniel Bennie (Note: Signed initially for the Development squad)	(Australia) Perth Glory	Free	
1 July 2024 (Note: The transfer was announced on 21 June, and became official on 1 July once his Heart of Midlothian contract expired)	RB	(Scotland) Rocco Friel	(Scotland) Heart of Midlothian	Free	
1 July 2024 (Note: The transfer was announced on 4 June, and became official on 1 July once his Aston Villa contract expired)	CB	(England) Jack McDowell	(England) Aston Villa	Free	
1 July 2024 (Note: The transfer was announced on 29 May, and became official on 1 July once his Tottenham Hotspur contract expired)	DM	(England) Kieran Morgan	(England) Tottenham Hotspur	Free	
1 July 2024 (Note: The transfer was announced on 27 June, and became official on 1 July once his Gent contract expired)	GK	(France) Paul Nardi	(Belgium) Gent	Free	
1 July 2024 (Note: The transfer was announced on 18 May, and became official on 1 July once his Burnley contract expired)	CF	(England) Rohan Vaughan	(England) Burnley	Free	
5 July 2024	CB	(Scotland) Liam Morrison	(Germany) Bayern Munich	Undisclosed	
5 July 2024	RB	(Brazil) Hevertton Santos	(Portugal) Estrela da Amadora	Free	
19 July 2024	CF	(Slovenia) Žan Celar	(Switzerland) Lugano	£1,700,000	
4 August 2024	DM	(Martinique) Jonathan Varane	(Spain) Sporting Gijón	£875,000	
23 August 2024	CM	(Denmark) Nicolas Madsen	(Belgium) Westerlo	£3,400,000	
26 October 2024	GK	(Wales) Nathan Shepperd	(England) Wycombe Wanderers	Free	
7 January 2025	GK	(England) Joel Halliday	(England) Basingstoke College	Free	
16 January 2025	CF	(Republic of Ireland) Cian Dillon	(Republic of Ireland) Shamrock Rovers	Undisclosed	
3 February 2025	LB	(Brazil) Esquerdinha	(Brazil) Fluminense	Undisclosed	
3 February 2025	CM	(England) Archie O'Brien	(England) Hertford Town	Free	
3 February 2025	AM	(England) Harvey Vale	(England) Chelsea	Undisclosed	

=== Out ===
Date	Position	Player	To	Fee	Ref
19 July 2024	CF	(Republic of Ireland) Sinclair Armstrong	(England) Bristol City	£2,500,000	
28 August 2024	CF	(Scotland) Lyndon Dykes	(England) Birmingham City	£1,000,000*	
30 September 2024	CB	(England) Henry Hawkins	(England) Whitehawk	Free	

=== Loaned in ===
Date	Position	Player	From	Date until	Ref.
13 August 2024	RW	(England) Karamoko Dembélé	(France) Brest	End of Season	
13 August 2024	LW	(Japan) Koki Saito	(Belgium) Lommel	End of Season	
30 August 2024	RB	(Scotland) Harrison Ashby	(England) Newcastle United	End of Season	
1 January 2025	CB	(England) Ronnie Edwards	(England) Southampton	End of Season	
29 January 2025	RW	(South Korea) Yang Min-hyeok	(England) Tottenham Hotspur	End of Season	

=== Loaned out ===
Date	Pos.	Player	To	Date until	Ref.
1 July 2024 (Note: The loan was announced on 29 June, and would officially commence on 1 July)	CF	(United States) Charlie Kelman	(England) Leyton Orient	End of Season	
13 July 2024	CM	(England) Taylor Richards	(England) Cambridge United	End of Season	
30 July 2024	LB	(France) Ziyad Larkeche	(Scotland) Dundee	End of Season	
3 August 2024	GK	(England) Murphy Cooper	(England) Stevenage	End of Season	
26 September 2024	CM	(Wales) Alfie Tuck	(England) Enfield Town	4 January 2025	
10 October 2024	CM	(England) Emmerson Sutton	(England) Hanwell Town	7 November 2024	
16 October 2024	GK	(Republic of Ireland) Conor Clark	(England) Farnham Town	23 October 2024	
26 November 2024	GK	(Republic of Ireland) Conor Clark	(England) Whitehawk	21 December 2024	
26 November 2024	CB	(England) Jaiden Putman	(England) Barking	5 January 2025	
6 December 2024	LB	(Slovakia) Casey Shann	(England) Bedford Town	4 January 2025	
10 December 2024	DM	(Iraq) Alexander Aoraha	(England) Ebbsfleet United	End of Season (Note: On 7 January, Aoraha's loan at Ebbsfleet was extended February, Then on 4 February, the loan was extended until the end of season)	
19 December 2024	CF	(England) Ridwan Hassan	(England) Harrow Borough	9 February 2025 (Note: On 10 January, Hassan's loan at Harrow was extended by a further month)	
10 January 2025	CM	(England) Fraser Neill	(England) Hendon	8 February 2025	
10 January 2025	GK	(Republic of Ireland) Conor Clark	(England) Lancing	25 January 2025 (Note: On 23 January, Clark's loan at Lancing was extended for a further two days)	
23 January 2025	CB	(France) Kemoko Keita-Turay	(England) Northwood	27 April 2025 (Note: On 21 February, Keita-Turay's loan at Northwood was extended by another month, On 25 March, the loan was extended again by a further month)	
24 January 2025	GK	(England) Matteo Salamon	(England) Wingate & Finchley	22 February 2025	
29 January 2025	RB	(Brazil) Hevertton	(Portugal) Vitória de Guimarães	End of Season	
7 February 2025	GK	(Republic of Ireland) Conor Clark	(England) Erith Town	23 February 2025 (Note: On 14 February, Clark's loan at Erith was extended for another week)	
21 February 2025	GK	(England) Matteo Salamon	(England) Hendon	26 April 2025 (Note: On 25 March, Salamon's loan at Hendon was extended by a further month)	
22 February 2025	LB	(England) Jake Leahy	(England) Aveley	End of Season (Note: On 27 March, Leahy's loan at Aveley was extended until the end of season)	
22 February 2025	CB	(England) Jack McDowell	(England) Aveley	End of Season (Note: On 27 March, McDowell's loan at Aveley was extended until the end of season)	
25 February 2025	RB	(England) Jaiden Putman	(England) Oxford City	End of Season	
25 February 2025	CM	(Wales) Alfie Tuck	(England) Farnborough	End of Season	
25 February 2025	CF	(England) Rohan Vaughan	(England) Oxford City	End of Season	
12 March 2025	DM	(England) Elijah Dixon-Bonner	(Sweden) Västerås SK	8 July 2025	
27 March 2025	CM	(England) Jake Coomes	(England) Sholing	End of Season	
27 March 2025	CF	(Republic of Ireland) Cian Dillon	(England) Enfield Town	End of Season	
27 March 2025	CF	(England) Ridwan Hassan	(England) Hanwell Town	End of Season	

=== Released or out of contract ===
Date	Pos.	Player	Subsequent club	Join date	Ref.
30 June 2024	RW	(England) Joseph Ajose	(England) Maidstone United	1 July 2024	
30 June 2024	GK	(Scotland) Jordan Archer	(England) Portsmouth	1 July 2024	
30 June 2024	RM	(Guyana) Stephen Duke-McKenna	(England) Harrogate Town	1 July 2024	
30 June 2024	RB	(England) Arkell Jude-Boyd	(England) Cheltenham Town	1 July 2024	
30 June 2024	LW	(England) Teddy Lawrence	(England) Bracknell Town	1 July 2024	
30 June 2024	CB	(England) Trent Rendall	(England) Dagenham & Redbridge	1 July 2024	
30 June 2024	CB	(England) Deon Woodman	(England) Wealdstone	1 July 2024	
30 June 2024	CB	(England) Joe Gubbins	(England) Southend United	9 July 2024	
30 June 2024	RW	(England) Chris Willock	(Wales) Cardiff City	12 July 2024	
30 June 2024	RW	(Ghana) Albert Adomah	(England) Walsall	23 July 2024	
30 June 2024	CM	(England) Andre Dozzell	(England) Portsmouth	5 August 2024	
30 June 2024	CF	(England) Hamzad Kargbo	(Wales) Newport County	8 August 2024	
30 June 2024	RW	(England) Micah Anthony	(England) Bristol Rovers	9 August 2024	
30 June 2024	CM	(England) Tyler Young	(England) Peterborough United	9 August 2024	
30 June 2024	GK	(England) Harry Cant	(England) Thatcham Town	11 August 2024	
30 June 2024	GK	(Bosnia and Herzegovina) Asmir Begović	(England) Everton	23 August 2024	
30 August 2024	RB	(United States) Reggie Cannon	(United States) Colorado Rapids	11 September 2024	
30 June 2024	CB	(England) Aaron Drewe	(England) Oxford City	27 September 2024	
30 June 2024	CM	(England) Rafferty Pedder	(United States) Tacoma Defiance	30 January 2025	
30 June 2024	AM	(Albania) Steven Bala	(Austria) FC Kitzbühel	1 February 2025	
30 June 2024	RB	(Sierra Leone) Osman Kakay	(Portugal) Boavista FC	12 February 2025	
30 June 2024	AM	(Morocco) Ramy Bouhiaoui	Wood Lane FC	1 July 2024	
30 June 2024	CF	(England) Nathan Jeche	Hemel Hempstead Town	21 September 2024	
30 June 2024	CM	(England) Samuel Sackey	Al-Riyadh SC	16 July 2025	
30 June 2024	CF	(England) Youssef Yahyaoui	Bashley FC	2 August 2025	

== Pre-season and friendlies ==
On 23 May, QPR announced their first pre-season friendly, against Reading. Two days later, an eleven-day training camp in Girona was confirmed. Home fixtures versus Tottenham Hotspur and Brighton & Hove Albion were later added. On 3 July, a behind-closed-doors fixture against UE Santa Coloma was announced. Five days later, L'Escala were added to R's pre-season schedule.

Win Draw Loss Fixtures

5 July 2024 Friendly	UE Santa Coloma	0–2	Queens Park Rangers	Navata
18:30 CEST (17:30 BST)		Report	Chair 41'; Frey 75'	Stadium: TorreMirona Golf & Spa Resort; Attendance: 0 (behind-closed-doors)

11 July 2024 Friendly	L'Escala	0–11	Queens Park Rangers	Navata
16:30 CEST (15:30 BST)		Report	Murphy 12', 21'; Frey 17'; Smyth 43'; Chair 55', 86', 88'; Hevertton 75', 82'; Bennie 81'; Armstrong 87'	Stadium: TorreMirona Golf & Spa Resort; Attendance: 0 (behind-closed-doors)

20 July 2024 Friendly	Queens Park Rangers	0–2	Tottenham Hotspur	White City
15:00 BST		Report	Bissouma 40'; Scarlett 87'	Stadium: Loftus Road; Attendance: 17,000

24 July 2024 Friendly	Fulham	4–0	Queens Park Rangers	Motspur Park
13:00 BST	Jiménez 15' (pen.); Wilson 25', 41'; Traoré 60'	Report		Stadium: Motspur Park Training Ground; Attendance: 0 (Behind-closed-doors)

27 July 2024 Friendly	Reading	1–0	Queens Park Rangers	Reading
14:00 BST	Azeez 48'	Report		Stadium: Madejski Stadium

3 August 2024 Friendly	Queens Park Rangers	0–1	Brighton & Hove Albion	White City
15:00 BST		Report	Welbeck 53' (pen.)	Stadium: Loftus Road

5 September 2024 Friendly	Brentford	0–0	Queens Park Rangers	Osterley
12:00 BST		Report		Stadium: Robert Rowan Performance Centre; Attendance: 0 (Behind-closed-doors)

== Competitions ==
=== Sky Bet Championship ===
==== League table ====
Pos	Team	Pld	W	D	L	GF	GA	GD	Pts
13	Norwich City	46	14	15	17	71	68	+3	57
14	Watford	46	16	9	21	53	61	−8	57
15	Queens Park Rangers	46	14	14	18	53	63	−10	56
16	Portsmouth	46	14	12	20	58	71	−13	54
17	Oxford United	46	13	14	19	49	65	−16	53

Source: English Football League
Rules for classification: 1) Points; 2) Goal difference; 3) Number of goals scored; 4) Head-to-head results; 5) Wins; 6) Away goals; 7) Penalty points (sec 9.5); 8) Number of 12-point sending off offences; 9) Play-off (only if needed to determine promotion/relegation)

==== Results summary ====
Overall								Home						Away					
Pld	W	D	L	GF	GA	GD	Pts	W	D	L	GF	GA	GD	W	D	L	GF	GA	GD
46	14	14	18	53	63	−10	56	7	8	8	31	34	−3	7	6	10	22	29	−7

Last updated: complete.
Source: Soccerway

==== Results by round ====
Round	1	2	3	4	5	6	7	8	9	10	11	12	13	14	15	16	17	18	19	20	21	22	23	24	25	26	27	28	29	30	31	32	33	34	35	36	37	38	39	40	41	42	43	44	45	46
Ground	H	A	H	A	A	H	A	H	A	H	H	A	H	H	A	H	A	A	H	H	A	H	A	A	H	H	A	A	H	A	H	A	H	A	H	A	A	H	A	H	A	H	A	H	H	A
Result	L	D	D	W	D	D	L	L	L	L	D	D	D	L	L	D	W	D	W	W	D	W	L	D	W	W	W	W	L	L	W	L	W	L	L	L	L	D	L	D	W	D	W	L	L	W
Position	19	18	19	12	12	15	17	22	22	24	23	23	23	23	24	24	23	23	20	19	18	14	17	17	15	13	12	10	13	14	13	13	13	14	14	14	14	15	16	16	15	15	14	15	15	15
Points	0	1	2	5	6	7	7	7	7	7	8	9	10	10	10	11	14	15	18	21	22	25	25	26	29	32	35	38	38	38	41	41	44	44	44	44	44	45	45	46	49	50	53	53	53	56

Source: EFL
A = Away; H = Home; W = Win; D = Draw; L = Loss; P = Postponed

==== Matches ====
On 26 June, the Championship fixtures were announced.

Win Draw Loss Fixtures

10 August 2024 1	Queens Park Rangers	1–3	West Bromwich Albion	Shepherd's Bush
12:30 BST	Andersen 16'; Cook (yellow card) 90+3'	Report	Maja 26', 51', 65'	Stadium: Loftus Road; Attendance: 15,900; Referee: David Webb

17 August 2024 2	Sheffield United	2–2	Queens Park Rangers	Sheffield
15:00 BST	Hamer 6', (yellow card) 72'; Moore 13'; Souza (yellow card) 31'	Report	Clarke-Salter (yellow card) 11'; Varane (yellow card) 45+1'; Dunne 55'; Colback (yellow card) 79' (yellow-red card) 83'; Dykes 88'	Stadium: Bramall Lane; Attendance: 27,527; Referee: Anthony Backhouse

24 August 2024 3	Queens Park Rangers	1–1	Plymouth Argyle	Shepherd's Bush
12:30 BST	Frey 3'; Clarke-Salter (yellow card) 85'; Varane (yellow card) 90+2'	Report	Forshaw (yellow card) 20' (yellow-red card) 29'; Whittaker 28'; Gyabi (yellow card) 42'; Randell (yellow card) 54'; Issaka (red card) 90+1'; Hazard (yellow card) 90+4'	Stadium: Loftus Road; Attendance: 15,285; Referee: Gavin Ward
Note: Fixture was initially scheduled for a 15:00 kick-off, but was moved for live Sky Sports broadcast.

30 August 2024 4	Luton Town	1–2	Queens Park Rangers	Luton
20:00 BST	Chong (yellow card) 2'; Dunne 18' (o.g.); Doughty (yellow card) 48'; Clark (yellow card) 79'	Report	Cook (yellow card) 30'; Field (yellow card) 51'; Madsen 59'; Frey 62'	Stadium: Kenilworth Road; Attendance: 11,798; Referee: Robert Madley
Note: Fixture was initially scheduled for 31 August, but was moved for live Sky Sports coverage.

14 September 2024 5	Sheffield Wednesday	1–1	Queens Park Rangers	Sheffield
15:00 BST	Bannan 90+3'	Report	Field (yellow card) 22'; Dunne (yellow card) 25'; Dembélé (yellow card) 70'; Lloyd 90+6'	Stadium: Hillsborough Stadium; Attendance: 26,283; Referee: Oliver Langford

21 September 2024 6	Queens Park Rangers	1–1	Millwall	Shepherd's Bush
12:30 BST	Frey 40'; Paal (yellow card) 66'; Varane (yellow card) 84'	Report	Watmore 34'; Saville (yellow card) 86'	Stadium: Loftus Road; Attendance: 15,350; Referee: John Busby
Note: Fixture was initially scheduled for a 15:00 kick-off, but was moved for live Sky Sports broadcast.

28 September 2024 7	Blackburn Rovers	2–0	Queens Park Rangers	Blackburn
12:30 BST	Hedges (yellow card) 8'; Travis (yellow card) 38', (goal) 53'; Batth 63'; Dolan (yellow card) 88'	Report	Santos (yellow card) 35'; Varane (red card) 45+2'; Cook (yellow card) 59'	Stadium: Ewood Park; Attendance: 13,789; Referee: Craig Pawson
Note: Fixture was initially scheduled for a 15:00 kick-off, but was moved for live Sky Sports broadcast.

1 October 2024 8	Queens Park Rangers	1–3	Hull City	Shepherd's Bush
19:45 BST	Madsen 44' (pen.); Dixon-Bonner (yellow card) 88'	Report	Simons (yellow card) 17'; Drameh 25'; Bedia 36'; Jones (yellow card) 63'; McLoughlin (yellow card) 64'; Millar 71'	Stadium: Loftus Road; Attendance: 13,407; Referee: Thomas Kirk

5 October 2024 9	Derby County	2–0	Queens Park Rangers	Derby
15:00 BST	Cashin (yellow card) 38'; Nelson 54'; Harness 55'	Report	Dunne (yellow card) 90+5'	Stadium: Pride Park Stadium; Attendance: 29,305; Referee: David Webb

19 October 2024 10	Queens Park Rangers	1–2	Portsmouth	Shepherd's Bush
15:00 BST	Dembélé 9'; Field (yellow card) 47'	Report	Potts 18'; McIntyre (yellow card) 54'; Lang 57' (pen.); Williams (yellow card) 85'; Yengi (yellow card) 90+7'	Stadium: Loftus Road; Attendance: 17,438; Referee: James Linington

22 October 2024 11	Queens Park Rangers	1–1	Coventry City	Shepherd's Bush
20:00 BST	Dembélé (yellow card) 9'; Morgan 63'; Clarke-Salter (yellow card) 75'	Report	Wright 4'; Dasilva (yellow card) 45+1'	Stadium: Loftus Road; Attendance: 14,173; Referee: James Bell
Note: Fixture was initially scheduled for a 19:45 kick-off, but was moved for live Sky Sports broadcast.

26 October 2024 12	Burnley	0–0	Queens Park Rangers	Burnley
15:00 BST		Report	Bennie (yellow card) 78'	Stadium: Turf Moor; Attendance: 19,187; Referee: Andrew Kitchen

2 November 2024 13	Queens Park Rangers	0–0	Sunderland	Shepherd's Bush
15:00 GMT	Celar (yellow card) 78'	Report	Bellingham (red card) 58'; Moore (yellow card) 70'; Roberts (yellow card) 90+6'	Stadium: Loftus Road; Attendance: 17,422; Referee: Ben Toner

5 November 2024 14	Queens Park Rangers	1–4	Middlesbrough	Shepherd's Bush
19:45 GMT	Dijksteel 69' (o.g.)	Report	Doak (yellow card) 11'; McGree 31'; Conway 35', (yellow card) 36'; Borges (yellow card) 45+3'; Latte Lath 87'; Barlaser 90+5'	Stadium: Loftus Road; Attendance: 14,054; Referee: Oliver Langford

9 November 2024 15	Leeds United	2–0	Queens Park Rangers	Leeds
15:00 GMT	Byram (yellow card) 12'; Bogle 19'; Piroe 90+5'	Report	Varane (yellow card) 47'; Morgan (yellow card) 54'	Stadium: Elland Road; Attendance: 36,011; Referee: Matt Donohue

23 November 2024 16	Queens Park Rangers	1–1	Stoke City	Shepherd's Bush
15:00 GMT	Field (yellow card) 22'; Celar (penalty missed) 27'; Gibson 62' (o.g.); Fox (yellow card) 80'; Ashby (yellow card) 90+4'	Report	Cannon 24'; Johansson (yellow card) 79'; Thompson (yellow card) 86'	Stadium: Loftus Road; Attendance: 15,688; Referee: Gavin Ward

27 November 2024 17	Cardiff City	0–2	Queens Park Rangers	Cardiff
19:45 GMT		Report	Celar 40', 90+1'; Dunne (yellow card) 86'	Stadium: Cardiff City Stadium; Attendance: 16,205; Referee: Stephen Martin

30 November 2024 18	Watford	0–0	Queens Park Rangers	Watford
12:30 GMT	Sierralta (yellow card) 34'; Pollock (yellow card) 54'	Report	Madsen (yellow card) 2'; Smyth (yellow card) 57'; Field (yellow card) 88'	Stadium: Vicarage Road; Attendance: 20,413; Referee: Andrew Kitchen
Note: Fixture was initially scheduled for a 15:00 kick-off, but was moved for live Sky Sports broadcast.

7 December 2024 19	Queens Park Rangers	3–0	Norwich City	Shepherd's Bush
15:00 GMT	Dunne 22', (yellow card) 52'; Morrison (yellow card) 39'; Nardi (yellow card) 43'; Kolli 45+4', 49'; Smyth (yellow card) 64'; Ashby (yellow card) 84'	Report	Marcondes (yellow card) 54'; Sainz (yellow card) 66'	Stadium: Loftus Road; Attendance: 16,218; Referee: Anthony Backhouse

11 December 2024 20	Queens Park Rangers	2–0	Oxford United	Shepherd's Bush
19:45 GMT	Field 53', 68'; Fox (yellow card) 90+1'; Lloyd (yellow card) 90+3'	Report	Brannagan (yellow card) 13'; Moore (yellow card) 27'	Stadium: Loftus Road; Attendance: 14,440; Referee: Adam Herczeg

14 December 2024 21	Bristol City	1–1	Queens Park Rangers	Bristol
12:30 GMT	Knight (yellow card) 26'; Twine 60'	Report	Dunne (yellow card) 45+2'; Field (yellow card) 58'; Smyth 65'	Stadium: Ashton Gate; Attendance: 20,925; Referee: Lewis Smith
Note: Fixture was initially scheduled for a 15:00 kick-off, but was moved for live Sky Sports broadcast.

21 December 2024 22	Queens Park Rangers	2–1	Preston North End	Shepherd's Bush
15:00 GMT	Kolli 50'; Dunne 89', (yellow card) 90+1'	Report	Osmajić 21'; Lindsay (yellow card) 32' (yellow-red card) 83'	Stadium: Loftus Road; Attendance: 15,323; Referee: Matt Donohue

26 December 2024 23	Swansea City	3–0	Queens Park Rangers	Swansea
15:00 GMT	Cullen 12', 28', (yellow card) 64'; Franco 33'; Eom Ji-sung (yellow card) 50'	Report	Morgan (yellow card) 34'; Paal (yellow card) 37'; Varane (yellow card) 81'	Stadium: Swansea.com Stadium; Attendance: 15,843; Referee: Ben Toner

29 December 2024 24	Norwich City	1–1	Queens Park Rangers	Norwich
12:30 GMT	Chrisene (yellow card) 38'; Núñez 89'	Report	Field (yellow card) 41'; Crnac 45+4' (o.g.); Ashby (yellow card) 62'; Morgan (yellow card) 68'; Frey (yellow card) 79'	Stadium: Carrow Road; Attendance: 26,563; Referee: Sam Barrott
Note: Fixture was initially scheduled for a 15:00 kick-off, but was moved for live Sky Sports broadcast.

1 January 2025 25	Queens Park Rangers	3–1	Watford	Shepherd's Bush
12:30 GMT	Frey 5', (yellow card) 31'; Dunne 37'; Fox (yellow card) 47'; Field 56', (yellow card) 83'; Smyth (yellow card) 86'	Report	Paal 55' (o.g.)	Stadium: Loftus Road; Attendance: 17,268; Referee: Stephen Martin
Note: Fixture was initially scheduled for a 15:00 kick-off, but was moved for live Sky Sports broadcast.

6 January 2025 26	Queens Park Rangers	2–1	Luton Town	Shepherd's Bush
20:00 GMT	Frey 24'; Varane (yellow card) 49'; Fox 62'	Report	McGuinness 45+2'; Chong (yellow card) 56'	Stadium: Loftus Road; Attendance: 14,025; Referee: Andy Davies
Note: Fixture was initially scheduled for 4 January, but was moved for live Sky Sports broadcast.

18 January 2025 27	Plymouth Argyle	0–1	Queens Park Rangers	Plymouth
12:30 GMT	Houghton (yellow card) 60'	Report	Varane (yellow card) 1'; Smyth (yellow card) 55'; Edwards (yellow card) 64'; Kolli 65'	Stadium: Home Park; Attendance: 16,988; Referee: Darren Bond
Note: Fixture was initially scheduled for a 15:00 kick-off, but was moved for live Sky Sports broadcasting.

21 January 2025 28	Hull City	1–2	Queens Park Rangers	Kingston upon Hull
19:45 GMT	Slater (yellow card) 43'; João Pedro (yellow card) 73'; Gelhardt 84'; Jones (yellow card) 90+6'	Report	Morgan (yellow card) 52'; Paal 64'; Saito 70'	Stadium: MKM Stadium; Attendance: 19,180; Referee: Ben Speedie

25 January 2025 29	Queens Park Rangers	0–2	Sheffield Wednesday	Shepherd's Bush
15:00 GMT	Chair (yellow card) 46'; Smyth (yellow card) 68'	Report	Smith 72'; Valery (yellow card) 80'; Paterson 88'	Stadium: Loftus Road; Attendance: 17,352; Referee: Sam Allison

1 February 2025 30	Millwall	2–1	Queens Park Rangers	Bermondsey
15:00 GMT	Connolly 1'; Cundle 25'; Saville (yellow card) 75'	Report	Lloyd 3', (yellow card) 74'; Morgan (yellow card) 59'	Stadium: The Den; Attendance: 17,914; Referee: John Busby

4 February 2025 31	Queens Park Rangers	2–1	Blackburn Rovers	Shepherd's Bush
19:45 GMT	Frey 5'; Colback 76'	Report	Dolan 53' (pen.)	Stadium: Loftus Road; Attendance: 13,571; Referee: James Linington
Note: Fixture was initially scheduled for 8 February, but was moved due to Blackburn's FA Cup involvements.

11 February 2025 32	Coventry City	1–0	Queens Park Rangers	Coventry
19:45 GMT	Kitching (yellow card) 11'; Grimes (yellow card) 62'; Mason-Clark (yellow card) 90+2'; Thomas 90+4'	Report	Paal (yellow card) 25'; Dunne (yellow card) 90+2'	Stadium: Coventry Building Society Arena; Attendance: 24,600; Referee: Will Finnie

14 February 2025 33	Queens Park Rangers	4–0	Derby County	Shepherd's Bush
20:00 GMT	Chair 21', 57'; Saitō 35'; Edwards 66'	Report	Mendez-Laing (yellow card) 65'; Jackson (yellow card) 90+4'	Stadium: Loftus Road; Attendance: 16,591; Referee: David Webb
Note: Fixture was initially scheduled for 15 February, but was moved for live Sky Sports broadcast.

22 February 2025 34	Portsmouth	2–1	Queens Park Rangers	Portsmouth
15:00 GMT	Ogilvie (yellow card) 17'; Murphy 48'; Ritchie 51'; Poole (yellow card) 86'; Saydee (yellow card) 90+5'	Report	Frey (yellow card) 45+4'; Dunne 74'; Chair (yellow card) 90+7'	Stadium: Fratton Park; Attendance: 20,426; Referee: Thomas Bramall

1 March 2025 35	Queens Park Rangers	1–2	Sheffield United	Shepherd's Bush
15:00 GMT	Dunne (yellow card) 49'; Frey 72' (pen.); Colback (yellow card) 78'; Lloyd (yellow card) 86'	Report	Brereton Díaz 10', (yellow card) 75'; Choudhury (yellow card) 14'; Campbell 54'; Ahmedhodžić (yellow card) 62'	Stadium: Loftus Road; Attendance: 17,346; Referee: Thomas Kirk

8 March 2025 36	West Bromwich Albion	1–0	Queens Park Rangers	West Bromwich
15:00 GMT	Molumby (yellow card) 33'; Armstrong 40' (pen.); Furlong (red card) 45+3'; Holgate (yellow card) 51'; Bartley (yellow card) 60'; Wildsmith (yellow card) 90+2'	Report	Cook (yellow card) 39'; Morrison (yellow card) 66'; Colback (yellow card) 70'; Lloyd (yellow card) 83'	Stadium: The Hawthorns; Attendance: 25,310; Referee: Adam Herczeg

11 March 2025 37	Middlesbrough	2–1	Queens Park Rangers	Middlesbrough
19:45 GMT	Conway 11'; Dijksteel 58'	Report	Cook 80'	Stadium: Riverside Stadium; Attendance: 22,177; Referee: David Webb

15 March 2025 38	Queens Park Rangers	2–2	Leeds United	Shepherd's Bush
12:30 GMT	Saito 17' (red card) 90+3'; Dunne (yellow card) 21'; Cook 30'; Paal (yellow card) 60'; Frey (yellow card) 82'	Report	Fox 41' (o.g.); Bogle 51' (yellow card) 90+4'; Struijk (yellow card) 72'	Stadium: Loftus Road; Attendance: 17,457; Referee: Tim Robinson
Note: Fixture was initially scheduled for a 15:00 kick-off, but was moved for live Sky Sports broadcasting.

29 March 2025 39	Stoke City	3–1	Queens Park Rangers	Stoke-on-Trent
15:00 GMT	Bae Jun-ho 21'; Tchamadeu 44'; Manhoef 54'; Pearson (yellow card) 67'	Report	Varane (yellow card) 43'; Colback (yellow card) 58'; Yang Min-hyeok (yellow card) 67', (goal) 78'	Stadium: bet365 Stadium; Attendance: 23,192; Referee: Tony Harrington

5 April 2025 40	Queens Park Rangers	0–0	Cardiff City	Shepherd's Bush
15:00 BST	Morrison (yellow card) 30'	Report	Colwill (yellow card) 28'	Stadium: Loftus Road; Attendance: 17,066; Referee: Dean Whitestone

9 April 2025 41	Oxford United	1–3	Queens Park Rangers	Oxford
19:45 BST	Mills 62', (yellow card) 64'; Brannagan (yellow card) 87'	Report	Edwards 7'; Romeny 42' (o.g.); Andersen (yellow card) 85'; Nardi (yellow card) 89'; Yang Min-hyeok 90+1'; Colback (yellow card) 90+7'	Stadium: Kassam Stadium; Attendance: 11,509; Referee: Elliot Bell

12 April 2025 42	Queens Park Rangers	1–1	Bristol City	Shepherd's Bush
15:00 BST	Colback (yellow card) 7'; Dembélé 21'; Smyth (yellow card) 68'	Report	Earthy 30'; McCrorie (yellow card) 47'	Stadium: Loftus Road; Attendance: 16,867; Referee: Leigh Doughty

18 April 2025 43	Preston North End	1–2	Queens Park Rangers	Preston
15:00 BST	Lindsay 45+5'; Whiteman 52'	Report	Kolli (yellow card) 48'; Ashby (yellow card) 70'; Frey 80'; Andersen 90+3'	Stadium: Deepdale; Attendance: 14,922; Referee: Jeremy Simpson

21 April 2025 44	Queens Park Rangers	1–2	Swansea City	Shepherd's Bush
15:00 BST	Ashby (yellow card) 40'; Dembélé 72'	Report	Fox 29' (o.g.); Darling 55'; Tymon (yellow card) 90+1'	Stadium: Loftus Road; Attendance: 16,351; Referee: Jeremy Simpson

26 April 2025 45	Queens Park Rangers	0–5	Burnley	Shepherd's Bush
12:30 BST	Edwards (yellow card) 50'; Colback (yellow card) 64'; Ashby (yellow card) 82'; Frey (yellow card) 89'	Report	Hannibal (yellow card) 8'; Cullen 9', (yellow card) 45+1'; Flemming 20', 28'; Sarmiento 62', 90+2'	Stadium: Loftus Road; Attendance: 16,977; Referee: James Linington
Note: Fixture was initially scheduled for a 15:00 kick-off, but was moved for live Sky Sports broadcasting.

3 May 2025 46	Sunderland	0–1	Queens Park Rangers	Sunderland
12:30 BST	Neil (yellow card) 29'; O'Nien (yellow card) 55'	Report	Madsen 5', (yellow card) 74'; Kolli (yellow card) 56'; Frey (yellow card) 90+4'	Stadium: Stadium of Light; Referee: Anthony Backhouse
Note: Fixture was initially scheduled for a 15:00 kick-off, but all EFL Championship final matchday fixtures were moved to an earlier kick-off.

=== Emirates FA Cup ===
QPR entered the FA Cup in the third round, and were drawn away to Premier League side Leicester City.

Win Draw Loss Fixtures

11 January 2025 Third round	Leicester City	6–2	Queens Park Rangers	Leicester
14:00 GMT	Justin 8', 63'; Mavididi 35'; Buonanotte 38'; Vardy 51' (pen.); Faes 90+3'	Report	Varane 18'; Kolli 45+2'	Stadium: King Power Stadium; Attendance: 28,242; Referee: David Webb
Note: Fixture was initially scheduled for a 15:00 kick-off, but was moved following advice from local authorities due to a clash with Leicester Tigers also having a home fixture later that evening.

=== Carabao Cup ===
On 27 June, the draw for the first round was made, with QPR being drawn away against League One side Cambridge United. In the second round, they were drawn at home to Championship side Luton Town. In the third round, they were against Premier League side Crystal Palace at home.

Win Draw Loss Fixtures

13 August 2024 First round	Cambridge United	1–2	Queens Park Rangers	Cambridge
19:45 BST	Brophy (yellow card) 9'; Digby 57'; Kaikai (yellow card) 68'	Report	Frey 13'; Smyth 36'; Andersen (yellow card) 45+1'; Bennie (yellow card) 81'	Stadium: Abbey Stadium; Attendance: 4,529; Referee: Paul Howard

27 August 2024 Second round	Queens Park Rangers	1–1 (4–1 p)	Luton Town	Shepherd's Bush
19:45 BST	Santos 11', (yellow card) 33'; Colback (yellow card) 48'; Celar (yellow card) 84'	Report	Nelson 16'; Walters (yellow card) 40'; Morris (yellow card) 72'	Stadium: Loftus Road; Attendance: 7,132; Referee: Leigh Doughty
	Penalties
	Celar (penalty scored); Dembélé (penalty scored); Clarke-Salter (penalty scored); Paal (penalty scored)		(penalty missed) Woodrow; (penalty scored) Doughty; (penalty missed) Chong

17 September 2024 Third round	Queens Park Rangers	1–2	Crystal Palace	Shepherd's Bush
19:45 BST	Varane (yellow card) 27'; Field 53', (yellow card) 90+5'; Ashby (yellow card) 58'; Smyth (yellow card) 75'	Report	Nketiah 16', (yellow card) 55'; Kamada (yellow card) 29'; Eze 64'; Henderson (yellow card) 90+1'	Stadium: Loftus Road; Attendance: 13,945; Referee: Sunny Singh Gill

== Statistics ==
=== Appearances ===
As of match played 3 May 2025

Players with no appearances are not included on the list
Italics indicate a loaned in player

No.	Pos	Nat	Player	Total		Sky Bet Championship		Emirates FA Cup		Carabao Cup	
No.	Pos	Nat	Player	Apps	Goals	Apps	Goals	Apps	Goals	Apps	Goals
1	GK	(France) FRA	Paul Nardi	45	0	45+0	0	0+0	0	0+0	0
3	DF	(Republic of Ireland) IRL	Jimmy Dunne	48	5	45+0	5	0+0	0	2+1	0
4	MF	(England) ENG	Jack Colback	26	1	16+8	1	0+1	0	1+0	0
5	DF	(England) ENG	Steve Cook	33	2	31+0	2	0+0	0	2+0	0
6	DF	(England) ENG	Jake Clarke-Salter	14	0	8+3	0	1+0	0	1+1	0
7	MF	(Scotland) SCO	Karamoko Dembélé	25	3	15+8	3	0+0	0	0+2	0
8	MF	(England) ENG	Sam Field	38	4	35+0	3	1+0	0	1+1	1
10	MF	(Morocco) MAR	Ilias Chair	29	2	20+8	2	1+0	0	0+0	0
11	FW	(Northern Ireland) NIR	Paul Smyth	47	2	30+13	1	0+1	0	2+1	1
12	FW	(Switzerland) SUI	Michael Frey	31	9	21+8	8	0+1	0	1+0	1
13	GK	(England) ENG	Joe Walsh	5	0	1+0	0	1+0	0	3+0	0
14	FW	(Japan) JPN	Koki Saito	42	3	25+14	3	1+0	0	2+0	0
15	DF	(Wales) WAL	Morgan Fox	26	1	12+14	1	0+0	0	0+0	0
16	DF	(Scotland) SCO	Liam Morrison	21	0	14+5	0	0+0	0	2+0	0
17	DF	(England) ENG	Ronnie Edwards	22	2	20+1	2	1+0	0	0+0	0
18	FW	(Slovenia) SLO	Žan Celar	21	2	10+9	2	0+0	0	2+0	0
19	MF	(England) ENG	Elijah Dixon-Bonner	6	0	0+3	0	0+0	0	3+0	0
20	DF	(Scotland) SCO	Harrison Ashby	31	0	17+12	0	1+0	0	1+0	0
21	MF	(England) ENG	Kieran Morgan	31	1	19+11	1	0+1	0	0+0	0
22	DF	(Suriname) SUR	Kenneth Paal	43	1	34+5	1	1+0	0	3+0	0
23	DF	(Brazil) BRA	Hevertton Santos	9	1	4+2	0	0+0	0	1+2	1
24	MF	(Denmark) DEN	Nicolas Madsen	34	3	20+11	3	1+0	0	1+1	0
25	MF	(Denmark) DEN	Lucas Andersen	35	2	13+20	2	0+0	0	1+1	0
26	FW	(Algeria) ALG	Rayan Kolli	21	5	9+11	4	1+0	1	0+0	0
27	FW	(Australia) AUS	Daniel Bennie	13	0	1+11	0	0+0	0	0+1	0
28	FW	(England) ENG	Alfie Lloyd	31	2	4+23	2	0+1	0	1+2	0
36	MF	(England) ENG	Emmerson Sutton	2	0	0+2	0	0	0	0	0
40	MF	(Martinique) MTQ	Jonathan Varane	43	1	29+10	0	1+0	1	3+0	0
23	DF	(Brazil) BRA	Hevertton Santos	9	1	4+2	0	0+0	0	1+2	1
47	FW	(South Korea) KOR	Yang Min-hyeok	14	2	8+6	2	0+0	0	0+0	0
Players who featured but departed the club permanently during the season:
9	FW	(Scotland) SCO	Lyndon Dykes	2	1	0+1	1	0+0	0	0+1	0

=== Goals ===
As of match played 3 May 2025

Rank	Player	Position	Championship	FA Cup	EFL Cup	Total
1	(Switzerland) Michael Frey	FW	8	0	1	9
2	(Republic of Ireland) Jimmy Dunne	DF	5	0	0	5
2	(Algeria) Rayan Kolli	FW	4	1	0	5
4	(England) Sam Field	MF	3	0	1	4
5	(Japan) Koki Saito	MF	3	0	0	3
5	(Scotland) Karamoko Dembele	MF	3	0	0	3
5	(Denmark) Nicolas Madsen	MF	3	0	0	3
8	(Slovenia) Žan Celar	FW	2	0	0	2
8	(England) Alfie Lloyd	FW	2	0	0	2
8	(Morocco) Ilias Chair	MF	2	0	0	2
8	(England) Steve Cook	DF	2	0	0	2
8	(South Korea) Yang Min-hyeok	MF	2	0	0	2
8	(Denmark) Lucas Andersen	MF	2	0	0	2
8	(England) Ronnie Edwards	DF	2	0	0	2
8	(Northern Ireland) Paul Smyth	FW	1	0	1	2
16	(Suriname) Kenneth Paal	DF	1	0	0	1
16	(Scotland) Lyndon Dykes	FW	1	0	0	1
16	(England) Kieran Morgan	MF	1	0	0	1
16	(Wales) Morgan Fox	DF	1	0	0	1
16	(England) Jack Colback	MF	1	0	0	1
16	(Martinique) Jonathan Varane	MF	0	1	0	1
16	(Brazil) Hevertton Santos	DF	0	0	1	1
Own goal			3	0	0	3
Total			53	2	4	59

=== Clean sheets ===
As of match played 3 May 2025

Rank	Player	Position	Championship	FA Cup	EFL Cup	Total
1	(France) Paul Nardi	GK	9	0	0	9
2	(England) Joe Walsh	GK	1	0	0	1
Total			10	0	0	10

== End of Season Awards ==
Supporters Player of the Season	Ref
(Republic of Ireland) Jimmy Dunne	

Ray Jones Players’ Player of the Year	Ref
(Republic of Ireland) Jimmy Dunne	

Daphne Biggs Young Player of the Year	Ref
(England) Ronnie Edwards	

Junior Hoops Player of the Year	Ref
(England) Ronnie Edwards	

Kiyan Prince Goal of the Season	Ref
(Northern Ireland) Paul Smyth v Bristol City (A)	
