= Ronnie Edwards (footballer) =

English footballer (born 2003)

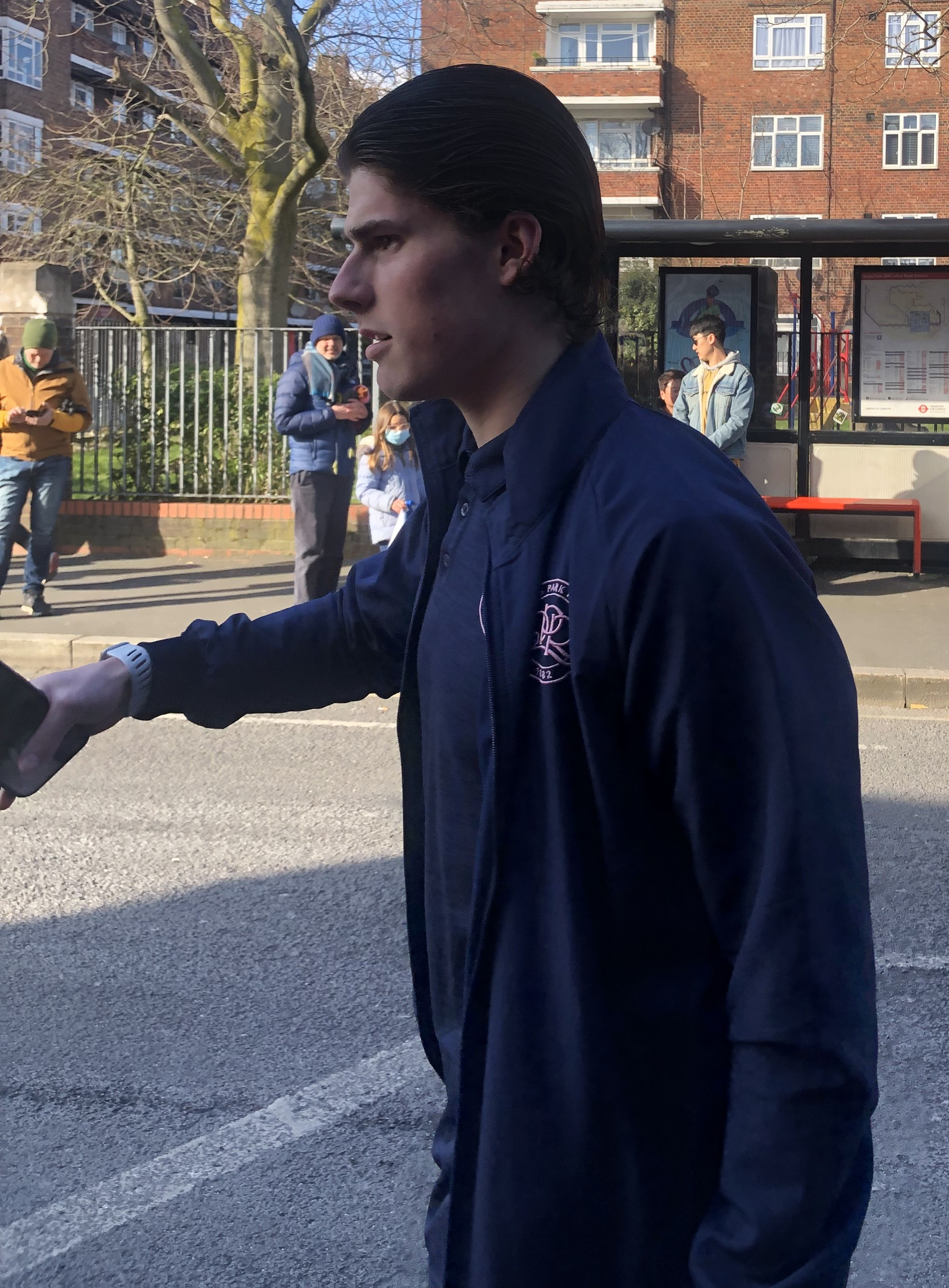
- Ronnie Edwards in 2025

Personal information
- Full name: Ronnie Lee Edwards
- Date of birth: 28 March 2003 (age 23)
- Place of birth: Harlow, England
- Height: 5 ft 11 in (1.80 m)
- Position: Defender

Team information
- Current team: Queens Park Rangers
- Number: 5

Youth career
- 2013–2019: Barnet

Senior career*
Years	Team	Apps	(Gls)
2019–2020	Barnet	1	(0)
2020–2024	Peterborough United	121	(1)
2024–2026	Southampton	12	(0)
2025	→ Queens Park Rangers (loan)	21	(2)
2026–	Queens Park Rangers	31	(1)

International career^{‡}
2021–2022	England U19	10	(0)
2022–2024	England U20	13	(0)
2025	England U21	2	(0)
Medal record
Men's football
Representing England
UEFA European Under-21 Championship
Winner	2025 Slovakia
UEFA European Under-19 Championship
Winner	2022 Slovakia
- * Club domestic league appearances and goals as of 06:03, 12 November 2026 (UTC) ‡ National team caps and goals as of 16:43, 21 April 2025 (UTC)

Ronnie Lee Edwards (born 28 March 2003) is an English professional footballer who plays as a defender for EFL Championship club Queens Park Rangers and the England U21 national team.

Edwards began his career with Barnet before earning a move to Peterborough United in 2020. In his first season, Peterborough won promotion to the Championship. In the following season, Edwards became a regular starter for the club, winning the Player of the Season award. In the 2023–24 season, Edwards was a member of the Peterborough team that won the EFL Trophy as well as winning the League One Young Player of the Season award. His form earned him a £3 million move to Premier League side Southampton. In January 2025, he joined Queens Park Rangers on loan and later joined the club permanently in January 2026.

Edwards has represented England at youth level, winning the 2022 UEFA European Under-19 Championship and 2025 UEFA European Under-21 Championship. He has also played for England at under-20 level.

== Club career ==
=== Barnet ===
Edwards joined Barnet at the age of nine, and progressed through the club's academy, captaining the under-18s. Aged sixteen, he made his senior debut when he captained a young Bees side in a Middlesex Senior Cup game against Staines Town on 17 December 2019. Four days later he made his league debut as a late substitute against Maidenhead United. He made five appearances for the Bees in the 2019–20 season.

=== Peterborough United ===
Edwards joined Peterborough United after a successful trial against Peterborough Sports in August 2020. He made his debut on 8 September 2020 in the EFL Trophy against Burton Albion.

Edwards made his full league debut on 15 December 2020 in a 1–1 draw away to Milton Keynes Dons.

The 2021–22 season saw Edwards establish himself in the first-team picture. Although the club suffered relegation from the Championship, the season proved a success on an individual level, winning four awards at the club's end of season awards, including the Player of the Season.

Edwards was awarded the EFL Young Player of the Month for January 2024, registering his 100th league start for the club in the same month. He was a member of the Peterborough side that won the 2023–24 EFL Trophy, starting in the final at Wembley Stadium.

=== Southampton ===
On 3 July 2024, Edwards joined Premier League club Southampton on a four-year contract for a reported £3 million. He made his debut for the club on 28 August 2024 in a 5–3 away victory against Cardiff City in the EFL Cup. On 4 December 2024, Edwards made his Premier League debut in a 5–1 home defeat against Chelsea after he replaced James Bree in the 78th minute.

==== Queens Park Rangers (loan) ====
On 1 January 2025, Edwards joined Championship club Queens Park Rangers on loan for the remainder of the 2024–25 season. He made his first appearance for the club in a 2–1 victory against Luton Town on 6 January 2025 after replacing Jonathan Varane in the 61st minute. On 14 February 2025, Edwards scored his first goal for the club in a 4–0 victory against Derby County.

=== Queens Park Rangers ===
On 9 January 2026, Edwards joined Queens Park Rangers permanently for an undisclosed fee.

== International career ==
Edwards was called up to a training camp with the England U19 national team in May 2021. In October 2021, he was called up to the full U19 squad for the friendly Marbella Cup tournament and made his debut during a 3–1 defeat against France.

On 17 June 2022, Edwards was included in the England U19 squad for the 2022 UEFA European Under-19 Championship. He started in the final as England won the tournament with a 3–1 extra time victory over Israel on 1 July 2022.

On 21 September 2022, Edwards made his England U20 debut during a 3–0 victory over Chile at the Pinatar Arena. On 10 May 2023, Edwards was included in the England squad for the 2023 FIFA U-20 World Cup. He started all four of their games at the tournament including the round of sixteen defeat against Italy.

On 21 March 2025, Edwards made his England U21 debut during a 5–3 defeat to France in Lorient. He was included in the England squad for the 2025 UEFA European Under-21 Championship. Edwards was an unused substitute in the final as England defeated Germany to win the tournament.

== Career statistics ==
As of 7 November 2026

Appearances and goals by club, season and competition
Club	Season	League			FA Cup		League Cup		Other		Total	
Club	Season	Division	Apps	Goals	Apps	Goals	Apps	Goals	Apps	Goals	Apps	Goals
Barnet	2019–20	National League	1	0	0	0	—		4 (Note: Two appearances in the FA Trophy, one appearance in the National League play-offs, one appearance in Middlesex Senior Cup)	0	5	0
Barnet	Total		1	0	0	0	—		4	0	5	0
Peterborough United	2020–21	League One	2	0	1	0	0	0	3 (Note: Appearances in EFL Trophy)	0	6	0
Peterborough United	2021–22	Championship	34	0	3	0	1	0	—		38	0
Peterborough United	2022–23	League One	40	0	1	0	0	0	3	0	44	0
Peterborough United	2023–24	League One	45	1	3	0	2	0	5 (Note: Three appearances in EFL Trophy, two appearances in League One play-offs)	0	55	1
Peterborough United	Total		121	1	8	0	3	0	11	0	143	1
Southampton	2024–25	Premier League	1	0	0	0	1	0	—		2	0
Southampton	2025–26	Championship	11	0	0	0	3	0	—		14	0
Southampton	Total		12	0	0	0	4	0	—		16	0
Queens Park Rangers (loan)	2024–25	Championship	21	2	1	0	—		—		22	2
Queens Park Rangers	2025–26	Championship	16	1	0	0	—		—		16	1
Queens Park Rangers	2026–27	Championship	15	0	0	0	1	0	—		16	0
Queens Park Rangers	Total		31	1	0	0	1	0	—		32	1
Career total			186	4	9	0	8	0	15	0	218	4

== Honours ==
Peterborough United

- EFL League One second-place promotion: 2020–21
- EFL Trophy: 2023–24

England U19

- UEFA European Under-19 Championship: 2022

England U21

- UEFA European Under-21 Championship: 2025

Individual

- Peterborough United Player of the Season: 2021–22
- EFL Young Player of the Month: January 2024
- EFL League One Young Player of the Season: 2023–24
- PFA Team of the Year: 2023–24 League One
