= 2021–22 Peterborough United F.C. season =

Peterborough United
2021–22 season
- Chairman: Darragh MacAnthony
- Manager: Darren Ferguson (until 20 February); Matthew Etherington (20 February–24 February) (caretaker); Grant McCann (from 24 February)
- Stadium: Weston Homes Stadium
- Championship: 22nd (relegated)
- FA Cup: Fifth round
- EFL Cup: First round
- Top goalscorer: League: Jonson Clarke-Harris (12); All: Jonson Clarke-Harris (12)
- Highest home attendance: 12,870 (v Nottingham Forest 23 April 2022)
- Lowest home attendance: 4,021 (v Plymouth Argyle 10 August 2021 (EFL Cup)
- Average home league attendance: 9,401
Home colours	Third colours

The 2021–22 season is Peterborough United's 88th year in their history and first season back in the Championship since the 2012–13 following promotion last season. Along with the league, the club will also compete in the FA Cup and the EFL Cup. The season covers the period from 1 July 2021 to 30 June 2022.

== First-team squad ==
As of 14 August 2021

Note: Flags indicate national team as has been defined under FIFA eligibility rules. Players may hold more than one non-FIFA nationality.

No.	Name	Nat.	Position(s)	Date of birth (age)	Apps.	Goals	Year signed	Signed from	Transfer fee
Goalkeepers
13	David Cornell	(Wales)	GK	28 March 1991 (age 35)	20	0	2021	(England) Ipswich Town	Free
25	Steven Benda	(Germany)	GK	1 October 1998 (aged 22)	0	0	2022	(Wales) Swansea City	Loan
28	Will Blackmore	(England)	GK	1 October 2001 (age 24)	1	0	2020	Academy	Trainee
Defenders
2	Ronnie Edwards	(England)	CB/DM	28 March 2003 (aged 18)	26	0	2020	(England) Barnet	Undisclosed
3	Dan Butler	(England)	LB/LM	26 August 1994 (aged 26)	103	3	2019	(Wales) Newport County	Free
4	Nathan Thompson	(England) (Wales)	CB/RB/DM	9 November 1990 (aged 30)	83	3	2019	(England) Portsmouth	Free
5	Mark Beevers	(England)	CB/LB	21 November 1989 (aged 31)	97	0	2019	(England) Bolton Wanderers	Free
6	Frankie Kent	(England)	CB	21 November 1995 (aged 25)	101	4	2019	(England) Colchester United	£360,000
12	Josh Knight	(England)	CB/RB/DM	7 September 1997 (age 29)	50	3	2021	(England) Leicester City	Undisclosed
24	Bali Mumba	(England)	RB/DM/CM	8 October 2001 (age 24)	2	1	2022	(England) Norwich City	Loan
29	Benjamin Mensah	(Italy) (Ghana)	CB	30 December 2002 (age 23)	4	0	2019	Academy	Trainee
31	Aaron Powell	(England)	LB	14 November 2002 (age 23)	0	0	2021	Academy	Trainee
32	Emmanuel Fernandez	(England)	CB	20 November 2001 (age 24)	1	0	2021	(England) Ramsgate	Undisclosed
33	Dave Bodie	(England)			0	0	2021	Academy	Trainee
43	Hayden Coulson	(England)	LB/LM	17 June 1998 (age 28)	0	0	2022	(England) Middlesbrough	Loan
Midfielders
7	Sammie Szmodics	(Republic of Ireland) (England)	AM/LW/CM	24 September 1995 (aged 25)	78	24	2020	(England) Bristol City	Undisclosed
8	Jack Taylor	(Republic of Ireland) (England)	CM/RM/RB	23 June 1998 (age 28)	73	11	2020	(England) Barnet	£500,000
10	Reece Brown	(England)	CM/AM	3 March 1996 (age 30)	56	2	2022	(England) Huddersfield Town	Loan
11	Jorge Grant	(England)	CM/DM/LM	19 December 1994 (age 31)	22	2	2021	(England) Lincoln City	Undisclosed
15	Kwame Poku	(Ghana) (England)	AM/RW/LW	11 August 2001 (age 25)	9	0	2021	(England) Colchester United	Undisclosed
16	Harrison Burrows	(England)	LM/LB/CM	12 January 2002 (aged 19)	62	4	2017	Academy	Trainee
18	Oliver Norburn	(Grenada) (England)	CM/RM/LM	26 October 1992 (age 33)	24	0	2021	(England) Shrewsbury Town	Undisclosed
23	Joe Ward	(England)	RM/RW/RB	22 August 1995 (aged 25)	168	15	2018	(England) Woking	Undisclosed
26	Joel Randall	(England)	LM/LB/CM	1 November 1999 (age 26)	7	0	2021	(England) Exeter City	Undisclosed
27	Kyle Barker	(England)	DM/CM	16 December 2000 (aged 20)	8	0	2020	Academy	Trainee
42	Jeando Fuchs	(Cameroon) (France)	DM/RB/LB	11 October 1997 (age 28)	1	0	2022	(Scotland) Dundee United	Undisclosed
Forwards
9	Jonson Clarke-Harris	(England)	CF	21 July 1994 (aged 26)	69	37	2020	(England) Bristol Rovers	£1,250,000
14	Jack Marriott	(England)	CF	9 September 1994 (age 32)	62	34	2021	(England) Derby County	Undisclosed
17	Ricky Jade-Jones	(England)	CF/SS/LW	8 November 2002 (age 23)	35	5	2019	Academy	Trainee
20	Callum Morton	(England)	CF	19 January 2000 (age 26)	0	0	2022	(England) West Bromwich Albion	Free
34	Hameed Ishola	(England)			0	0	2021	Academy	Trainee
Out on Loan
1	Christy Pym	(England)	GK	24 April 1995 (age 31)	93	0	2019	(England) Exeter City	Free
19	Idris Kanu	(Sierra Leone) (England)	RW/CF	5 December 1999 (aged 21)	69	3	2017	(England) Aldershot Town	Undisclosed
21	Joe Tomlinson	(England)	LB	9 June 2000 (age 26)	5	0	2021	(England) Eastleigh	Undisclosed
30	Charlie O'Connell	(England)	CM	19 December 2002 (age 23)	1	0	2021	Academy	Trainee
	Serhat Tasdemir	(Azerbaijan) (England)	RM/CM/LM	21 July 2000 (aged 20)	20	1	2019	(England) AFC Fylde	Undisclosed
	Ryan Broom	(Wales)	RM/CM/AM	4 September 1996 (aged 24)	18	1	2020	(England) Cheltenham Town	Undisclosed

== Statistics ==
As of as of games played on 7 May 2022

No.	Pos	Nat	Player	Total		Championship		FA Cup		League Cup	
No.	Pos	Nat	Player	Apps	Goals	Apps	Goals	Apps	Goals	Apps	Goals
2	DF	(England) ENG	Ronnie Edwards	37	0	30+3	0	3+0	0	1+0	0
3	DF	(England) ENG	Dan Butler	22	0	19+3	0	0+0	0	0+0	0
4	DF	(England) ENG	Nathan Thompson	29	1	27+0	1	1+1	0	0+0	0
5	DF	(England) ENG	Mark Beevers	15	0	14+0	0	1+0	0	0+0	0
6	DF	(England) ENG	Frankie Kent	36	0	32+1	0	2+0	0	1+0	0
7	MF	(Republic of Ireland) IRL	Sammie Szmodics	38	7	26+9	6	2+1	1	0+0	0
8	MF	(Republic of Ireland) IRL	Jack Taylor	35	3	28+6	3	1+0	0	0+0	0
9	FW	(Jamaica) JAM	Jonson Clarke-Harris	43	12	31+9	12	1+2	0	0+0	0
10	MF	(England) ENG	Reece Brown*	10	0	5+3	0	0+2	0	0+0	0
11	MF	(England) ENG	Jorge Grant	28	2	20+5	2	2+0	0	1+0	0
12	DF	(England) ENG	Josh Knight	38	0	30+5	0	2+0	0	1+0	0
13	GK	(Wales) WAL	David Cornell	31	0	29+0	0	1+0	0	1+0	0
14	FW	(England) ENG	Jack Marriott	29	9	15+12	9	1+1	0	0+0	0
15	MF	(Ghana) GHA	Kwame Poku	22	0	10+9	0	2+0	0	1+0	0
16	MF	(England) ENG	Harrison Burrows	39	3	28+8	3	1+1	0	1+0	0
17	FW	(England) ENG	Ricky Jade-Jones	21	1	6+11	0	1+2	1	1+0	0
18	MF	(Grenada) GRN	Oliver Norburn	37	0	33+2	0	2+0	0	0+0	0
20	FW	(England) ENG	Callum Morton*	7	0	3+4	0	0+0	0	0+0	0
22	FW	(Spain) ESP	Kai Corbett	1	0	1+0	0	0+0	0	0+0	0
23	MF	(England) ENG	Joe Ward	40	1	30+7	0	2+0	1	0+1	0
24	DF	(England) ENG	Bali Mumba*	13	1	7+3	0	1+2	1	0+0	0
25	GK	(Germany) GER	Steven Benda*	11	0	9+0	0	2+0	0	0+0	0
26	MF	(England) ENG	Joel Randall	12	0	1+10	0	0+0	0	1+0	0
27	MF	(England) ENG	Kyle Barker	1	0	0+0	0	0+0	0	0+1	0
32	DF	(England) ENG	Emmanuel Fernandez	1	0	1+0	0	0+0	0	0+0	0
40	FW	(England) ENG	Joe Taylor	3	0	0+3	0	0+0	0	0+0	0
42	MF	(Cameroon) CMR	Jeando Fuchs	19	0	16+1	0	2+0	0	0+0	0
43	DF	(England) ENG	Hayden Coulson*	8	0	5+1	0	1+1	0	0+0	0
Players out on loan:
1	GK	(England) ENG	Christy Pym	7	0	7+0	0	0+0	0	0+0	0
19	FW	(Sierra Leone) SLE	Idris Kanu	6	0	1+4	0	0+0	0	0+1	0
21	DF	(England) ENG	Joe Tomlinson	7	0	3+2	0	1+0	0	1+0	0
Player who left the club:
10	FW	(Scotland) SCO	Siriki Dembélé	26	5	23+2	5	1+0	0	0+0	0
20	MF	(Republic of Ireland) IRL	Conor Coventry*	12	0	4+8	0	0+0	0	0+0	0
22	MF	(Scotland) SCO	Ethan Hamilton	3	0	0+2	0	0+0	0	1+0	0

=== Goals record ===
As of 7 May 2022

Rank	No.	Nat.	Po.	Name	Championship	FA Cup	League Cup	Total
1	9	(England)	CF	Jonson Clarke-Harris	11	0	0	11
2	14	(England)	CF	Jack Marriott	9	0	0	9
3	7	(Republic of Ireland)	AM	Sammie Szmodics	6	1	0	8
4	10	(Scotland)	RW	Siriki Dembélé	5	0	0	5
5	8	(Republic of Ireland)	CM	Jack Taylor	3	0	0	3
5	16	(England)	LM	Harrison Burrows	3	0	0	3
7	11	(England)	CM	Jorge Grant	2	0	0	2
8	4	(England)	RB	Nathan Thompson	1	0	0	1
8	17	(England)	CF	Ricky Jade-Jones	0	1	0	1
8	23	(England)	RM	Joe Ward	0	1	0	1
8	24	(England)	LB	Bali Mumba	0	1	0	1
Own Goals					1	0	0	1
Total					38	4	0	42

=== Disciplinary record ===
As of 7 May 2022

Rank	No.	Nat.	Po.	Name	Championship			FA Cup			League Cup			Total		
Rank	No.	Nat.	Po.	Name	Booked	(yellow card) (yellow-red card)	Sent off (straight red)	Booked	(yellow card) (yellow-red card)	Sent off (straight red)	Booked	(yellow card) (yellow-red card)	Sent off (straight red)	Booked	(yellow card) (yellow-red card)	Sent off (straight red)
1	18	(Grenada)	CM	Oliver Norburn	9	0	0	2	0	0	0	0	0	11	0	0
2	4	(England)	RB	Nathan Thompson	8	0	0	1	0	0	0	0	0	9	0	0
3	2	(England)	CB	Ronnie Edwards	6	0	0	1	0	0	0	0	0	7	0	0
3	12	(England)	CB	Josh Knight	7	0	0	0	0	0	0	0	0	7	0	0
5	3	(England)	LB	Dan Butler	6	0	0	0	0	0	0	0	0	6	0	0
5	6	(England)	CB	Frankie Kent	5	0	0	0	0	0	0	0	0	5	0	0
5	7	(Republic of Ireland)	AM	Sammie Szmodics	4	0	0	1	0	0	0	0	0	5	0	0
8	8	(Republic of Ireland)	CM	Jack Taylor	4	0	0	0	0	0	0	0	0	4	0	0
8	16	(England)	LM	Harrison Burrows	4	0	0	0	0	0	0	0	0	4	0	0
8	23	(England)	RW	Joe Ward	3	0	1	0	0	0	0	0	0	3	0	1
11	5	(England)	CB	Mark Beevers	3	0	0	0	0	0	0	0	0	3	0	0
11	9	(England)	CF	Jonson Clarke-Harris	2	0	0	1	0	0	0	0	0	3	0	0
11	24	(England)	LB	Bali Mumba	3	0	0	0	0	0	0	0	0	3	0	0
11	43	(England)	LB	Hayden Coulson	1	0	1	0	0	0	0	0	0	1	0	1
15	10	(England)	CM	Reece Brown	2	0	0	0	0	0	0	0	0	2	0	0
15	13	(Wales)	GK	David Cornell	2	0	0	0	0	0	0	0	0	2	0	0
15	14	(England)	CF	Jack Marriott	2	0	0	0	0	0	0	0	0	2	0	0
15	17	(England)	CF	Ricky Jade-Jones	1	0	0	1	0	0	0	0	0	2	0	0
15	42	(Cameroon)	DM	Jeando Fuchs	1	0	0	1	0	0	0	0	0	2	0	0
20	10	(Scotland)	RW	Siriki Dembélé	1	0	0	0	0	0	0	0	0	1	0	0
20	11	(England)	CM	Jorge Grant	1	0	0	0	0	0	0	0	0	1	0	0
20	15	(England)	AM	Kwame Poku	1	0	0	0	0	0	0	0	0	1	0	0
20	20	(Republic of Ireland)	DM	Conor Coventry	1	0	0	0	0	0	0	0	0	1	0	0
Total					78	0	1	7	0	0	0	0	0	85	0	1

== Pre-season friendlies ==
As part of their pre-season preparations, Peterborough United announced friendly matches against Bedford Town, Stamford, Gillingham, Barnet, double header with Oxford United, Portsmouth, Swindon Town and King's Lynn Town.

10 July 2021 Friendly	Bedford Town	0–8	Peterborough United	Cardington
15:00 BST		Report	Grant 6', 26' (pen.); Thompson 12'; Jones 15'; Eisa 70', 74'; Burrows 78', 80'	Stadium: The Eyrie

13 July 2021 Friendly	Stamford	0–4	Peterborough United	Stamford
19:00 BST			Szmodics 30'; Dembélé 34' (pen.); Ward 71', 74'	Stadium: Zeeco Stadium; Attendance: 900; Referee: Neil Hair

17 July 2021 Friendly	Chelsea	6–1	Peterborough United	Stoke d'Abernon
11:00 BST	Abraham (?); Pulisic (?); Ziyech (?)		Dembélé (?)	Stadium: Cobham Training Centre

20 July 2021 Friendly	Gillingham	Cancelled	Peterborough United	Gillingham
18:00 BST				Stadium: Priestfield Stadium
Note: Match cancelled due to positive COVID-19 test results.

24 July 2021 Friendly	Barnet	2–3	Peterborough United	Canons Park
14:00 BST	Marriott 44'; Trialist 67'	Report	Kanu 29'; Dembélé 38'; Taylor 57'	Stadium: The Hive Stadium

24 July 2021 Friendly	Barnet	0–2	Peterborough United	Canons Park
16:00 BST		Report	Trialist (?); Broom 35'	Stadium: The Hive Stadium

28 July 2021 Friendly	Oxford United	2–2	Peterborough United	Horspath
13:00 BST	Sykes (?); Winnall (?)	Report	Hamilton (?)	Stadium: Oxford Sports Park; Attendance: 0 (Behind-closed-doors)

28 July 2021 Friendly	Oxford United	2–2	Peterborough United	Horspath
13:00 BST	Forde (?); Agyei (?)	Report	Ward (?); Kanu (?)	Stadium: Oxford Sports Park; Attendance: 0 (Behind-closed-doors)

31 July 2021 Friendly	Portsmouth	2–0	Peterborough United	Milton
15:00 BST	Tunnicliffe 24'; Curtis 39'	Report		Stadium: Fratton Park; Attendance: 4,077; Referee: Andy Davies

31 July 2021 Friendly	Swindon Town	0–1	Peterborough United	Swindon
15:00 BST		Report	Trialist (?)	Stadium: County Ground; Attendance: 2,431

3 August 2021 Friendly	King's Lynn Town	1–0	Peterborough United	King's Lynn
19:30 BST	Barrows 85'	Report		Stadium: The Walks

== Competitions ==
=== Championship ===
==== League table ====
Pos	Team	Pld	W	D	L	GF	GA	GD	Pts	Promotion, qualification or relegation
19	Hull City	46	14	9	23	41	54	−13	51	
20	Birmingham City	46	11	14	21	50	75	−25	47	
21	Reading	46	13	8	25	54	87	−33	41 (Note: Reading were deducted 6 points for breach of profit and sustainability regulations.)	
22	Peterborough United (R)	46	9	10	27	43	87	−44	37	Relegation to EFL League One
23	Derby County (R)	46	14	13	19	45	53	−8	34 (Note: Derby County were deducted 12 points for entering administration, and a further 9 points for financial irregularities.)	Relegation to EFL League One
24	Barnsley (R)	46	6	12	28	33	73	−40	30	Relegation to EFL League One

Source: EFL Official Website
Rules for classification: 1) Points; 2) Goal difference; 3) Number of goals scored; 4) Head-to-head results; 5) Wins; 6) Away goals; 7) Penalty points (sec 9.5); 8) 12-point sending off offences
(R) Relegated

==== Results summary ====
Overall								Home						Away					
Pld	W	D	L	GF	GA	GD	Pts	W	D	L	GF	GA	GD	W	D	L	GF	GA	GD
46	9	10	27	43	87	−44	37	6	7	10	27	33	−6	3	3	17	16	54	−38

Last updated: 7 May 2022.

==== Results by matchday ====
Matchday	1	2	3	4	5	6	7	8	9	10	11	12	13	14	15	16	17	18	19	20	21	22	23	24	25	26	27	28	29	30	31	32	33	34	35	36	37	38	39	40	41	42	43	44	45	46
Ground	A	H	H	A	H	A	A	H	A	H	H	A	A	H	A	H	H	A	A	H	A	H	A	H	A	A	H	A	H	H	A	A	H	A	A	H	H	A	H	H	A	H	A	H	A	H
Result	L	W	D	L	L	L	L	W	L	D	L	L	W	W	L	D	L	L	L	D	L	W	L	L	L	D	L	L	L	D	L	L	L	L	D	D	L	W	L	D	D	W	W	L	L	W
Position	24	15	15	17	20	23	23	22	21	22	23	23	20	20	20	20	21	22	22	22	22	22	22	22	22	22	22	22	22	22	23	23	24	24	24	24	24	23	24	24	24	23	22	22	23	22

Updated to match(es) played on 30 April 2022. Source: Statto.com
A = Away; H = Home; W = Win; D = Draw; L = Loss

==== Matches ====
Peterborough United's fixtures were announced on 24 June 2021.

7 August 2021 1	Luton Town	3–0	Peterborough United	Luton
15:00 BST	Adebayo 30'; Cornick 68'; Onyedinma 71'; Bree (yellow card) 90+3' Nathan Jones (yellow card)	Report	Kent (yellow card) 16'; Knight (yellow card) 56'; Beevers (yellow card) 64'; Ward (yellow card) 84'; Szmodics (yellow card) 87' Darren Ferguson (yellow card)	Stadium: Kenilworth Road; Attendance: 10,019; Referee: Andy Woolmer

14 August 2021 2	Peterborough United	2–1	Derby County	Peterborough
12:30 BST	Beevers (yellow card) 25'; Thompson (yellow card) 63'; Butler (yellow card) 83'; Burrows 90+1'; Dembélé 90+10', (yellow card) 90+10'	Report	Stretton 77'; Sibley (yellow card) 90+1'; Forsyth (yellow card) 90+4'	Stadium: Weston Homes Stadium; Attendance: 10,477; Referee: David Webb
Note: Live on Sky Sports

17 August 2021 3	Peterborough United	2–2	Cardiff City	Peterborough
19:45 BST	Burrows 49'; Dembélé 51'; Ward (yellow card) 86'	Report	Pack (yellow card) 44'; Flint (yellow card) 45', (goal) 83', 90+6'	Stadium: Weston Homes Stadium; Attendance: 8,954; Referee: Thomas Bramall

21 August 2021 4	Preston North End	1–0	Peterborough United	Preston
15:00 BST	Bauer 14'; Whiteman (yellow card) 51'; Ledson (yellow card) 84'	Report		Stadium: Deepdale; Attendance: 9,952; Referee: Dean Whitestone

28 August 2021 5	Peterborough United	0–1	West Bromwich Albion	Peterborough
20:00 BST	Norburn (yellow card) 8'; Thompson (yellow card) 71'	Report	Johnstone (yellow card) 64'; Mowatt (yellow card) 70'; Furlong (yellow card) 82'; Ajayi 90+4'; O'Shea (yellow card) 90+5'	Stadium: Weston Homes Stadium; Referee: James Linington
Note: Live on Sky Sports

11 September 2021 6	Sheffield United	6–2	Peterborough United	Sheffield
15:00 BST	Ndiaye 14', 70'; Fleck 51'; Osborn 53', 90+3'; Gibbs-White 68'	Report	Marriott 40'; Burrows (yellow card) 49'; Butler (yellow card) 59'; Clarke-Harris 79' (pen.)	Stadium: Bramall Lane; Attendance: 27,359; Referee: Steve Martin

14 September 2021 7	Reading	3–1	Peterborough United	Reading
20:00 BST	Swift 64'; Dele-Bashiru 67', 88'	Report	Kent (yellow card) 45+3'; Thompson 74'	Stadium: Select Car Leasing Stadium; Attendance: 11,411; Referee: Tim Robinson

18 September 2021 8	Peterborough United	3–0	Birmingham City	Peterborough
15:00 BST	Dean 1' (o.g.); Clarke-Harris 35' (pen.); Grant 50'; Kent (yellow card) 70'; Butler (yellow card) 90+1'	Report	Woods (yellow card) 35'; Gardner (red card) 65'; Aneke (yellow card) 74'	Stadium: Weston Homes Stadium; Attendance: 11,988; Referee: Jarred Gillett

24 September 2021 9	Coventry City	3–0	Peterborough United	Coventry
19:45 BST	Hamer 57'; Gyökeres 61', 64'	Report	Butler (yellow card) 44'	Stadium: Coventry Building Society Arena; Attendance: 20,652; Referee: Geoff Eltringham

29 September 2021 10	Peterborough United	0–0	Bournemouth	Peterborough
19:45 BST	Burrows (yellow card) 81'	Report		Stadium: Weston Homes Stadium; Attendance: 8,971; Referee: Andy Woolmer

2 October 2021 11	Peterborough United	2–3	Bristol City	Peterborough
15:00 BST	Szmodics 22', 43'; Thompson (yellow card) 90+4'	Report	Thompson 34' (o.g.); Tanner 40'; King (yellow card) 82'; Martin 84'	Stadium: Weston Homes Stadium; Attendance: 8,560; Referee: David Coote

16 October 2021 12	Middlesbrough	2–0	Peterborough United	Middlesbrough
15:00 BST	Payero (yellow card) 45'; Ikpeazu (yellow card) 67'; McNair 85' (pen.); Coburn 90+4'	Report	Taylor (yellow card) 22'; Edwards (yellow card) 35'; Szmodics (yellow card) 49'; Cornell (yellow card) 84'	Stadium: Riverside Stadium; Attendance: 19,556; Referee: John Busby

20 October 2021 13	Hull City	1–2	Peterborough United	Kingston upon Hull
19:45 BST	Huddlestone (yellow card) 14'; Magennis 45+1', (penalty missed) 66'	Report	Edwards (yellow card) 16'; Taylor 43'; Thompson (yellow card) 47'; Dembélé 72'	Stadium: MKM Stadium; Attendance: 10,245; Referee: Leigh Doughty

23 October 2021 14	Peterborough United	2–1	Queens Park Rangers	Peterborough
15:00 BST	Burrows 56'; Dembélé 90+1'	Report	Chair 50'	Stadium: Weston Homes Stadium; Attendance: 12,035; Referee: Jarred Gillett

30 October 2021 15	Swansea City	3–0	Peterborough United	Landore
15:00 BST	Bidwell 2'; Piroe 13'; Ntcham 45+1'; Manning (yellow card) 63'; Downes (yellow card) 83'	Report		Stadium: Swansea.com Stadium; Attendance: 16,639; Referee: Matt Donohue

2 November 2021 16	Peterborough United	1–1	Huddersfield Town	Peterborough
19:45 GMT	Norburn (yellow card) 36'; Thompson (yellow card) 54'; Taylor (yellow card) 81'; Clarke-Harris 84'	Report	Thomas (yellow card) 45'; Toffolo (yellow card) 52'; Ward 74'; O'Brien (yellow card) 83'	Stadium: Weston Homes Stadium; Attendance: 7,983; Referee: Keith Stroud

6 November 2021 17	Peterborough United	0–1	Fulham	Peterborough
15:00 GMT	Norburn (yellow card) 90'	Report	Odoi (yellow card) 32'; Kebano (yellow card) 66'; Mitrović 74'; Ream (yellow card) 84'; Cairney (yellow card) 90+3'	Stadium: Weston Homes Stadium; Attendance: 11,214; Referee: Dean Whitestone

20 November 2021 18	Stoke City	2–0	Peterborough United	Stoke-on-Trent
15:00 GMT	Vrančić 3'; Batth (yellow card) 25'; Allen (yellow card) 73'; Smith (yellow card) 79'; Surridge (red card) 90+1'; Campbell (yellow card) 90+5', (goal) 90+6'; Davies (yellow card) 90+9'	Report	Taylor (yellow card) 52'; Knight (yellow card) 90+1'	Stadium: Bet365 Stadium; Attendance: 21,285; Referee: Geoff Eltringham

24 November 2021 19	Blackburn Rovers	4–0	Peterborough United	Blackburn
19:45 GMT	Pickering 16'; Brereton 35', (yellow card) 53', (goal) 60'; Lenihan 45'	Report	Beevers (yellow card) 44'; Edwards (yellow card) 71'	Stadium: Ewood Park; Attendance: 9,038; Referee: John Brooks

27 November 2021 20	Peterborough United	0–0	Barnsley	Peterborough
15:00 GMT	Butler (yellow card) 29'; Coventry (yellow card) 36'; Norburn (yellow card) 74'	Report	Andersen (yellow card) 78'; Gomes (yellow card) 83'	Stadium: Weston Homes Stadium; Referee: John Busby

4 December 2021 21	Nottingham Forest	2–0	Peterborough United	West Bridgford
15:00 GMT	Garner 72'; Samba (yellow card) 82'; Yates 84'	Report	Clarke-Harris (yellow card) 57'; Butler (yellow card) 64'; Thompson (yellow card) 79'; Edwards (yellow card) 86'	Stadium: The City Ground; Attendance: 28,308; Referee: Thomas Bramall

11 December 2021 22	Peterborough United	2–1	Millwall	Peterborough
15:00 GMT	Norburn (yellow card) 24'; McNamara 64' (o.g.); Clarke-Harris 68'; Cornell (yellow card) 90+3'	Report	Bradshaw 16'; Malone (yellow card) 22'; McNamara (yellow card) 38'; Hutchinson (yellow card) 45+1'; Mitchell (yellow card) 56'; Evans (yellow card) 62'	Stadium: Weston Homes Stadium; Attendance: 9,140; Referee: Leigh Doughty

18 December 2021 23	Blackpool	3–1	Peterborough United	Blackpool
15:00 GMT	Anderson 27'; Carey 86'; Yates 90'	Report	Dembélé 11'	Stadium: Bloomfield Road; Attendance: 9,745; Referee: David Webb

15 January 2022 24	Peterborough United	1–4	Coventry City	Peterborough
15:00 GMT	Norburn (yellow card) 8'; Grant 37'; Mumba (yellow card) 41'; Edwards (yellow card) 61'	Report	Hamer 15'; Hyam (yellow card) 24'; Godden 25', 90+1'; Thompson 81' (o.g.)	Stadium: Weston Homes Stadium; Attendance: 10,282; Referee: Keith Stroud

22 January 2022 25	West Bromwich Albion	3–0	Peterborough United	West Bromwich
15:00 GMT	Kipré 78'; Molumby (yellow card) 82'; Grant 85'; Diangana 89'	Report	Kent (yellow card) 90+4'	Stadium: The Hawthorns; Attendance: 21,251; Referee: Jeremy Simpson

25 January 2022 26	Birmingham City	2–2	Peterborough United	Bordesley
19:45 GMT	Gardner 85'; Hogan 88'	Report	Marriott 16'; Kent (yellow card) 45+1'; Clarke-Harris 67' (pen.)	Stadium: St Andrew's; Attendance: 16,380; Referee: Oliver Langford

29 January 2022 27	Peterborough United	0–2	Sheffield United	Peterborough
17:30 GMT		Report	Sharp 54'; Hourihane (yellow card) 62'; Morton 81' (o.g.)	Stadium: Weston Homes Stadium; Attendance: 10,152; Referee: Dean Whitestone

9 February 2022 28	Cardiff City	4–0	Peterborough United	Leckwith
19:45 GMT	Ralls 4'; Flint 39'; Doyle (yellow card) 44'; Ng (yellow card) 52'; Hugill 57'; Wintle (yellow card) 74'; Ikpeazu 85'	Report	Mumba (yellow card) 32'	Stadium: Cardiff City Stadium; Attendance: 17,297; Referee: Kevin Friend

12 February 2022 29	Peterborough United	0–1	Preston North End	Peterborough
15:00 GMT		Report	Bauer (yellow card) 28' van den Berg (yellow card) 73'; Archer 80'	Stadium: Weston Homes Stadium; Attendance: 9,072; Referee: Tim Robinson

16 February 2022 30	Peterborough United	0–0	Reading	Peterborough
19:45 GMT	Norburn (yellow card) 21'; Coulson (yellow card) 46'; Thompson (yellow card) 89'	Report	Holmes (yellow card) 86'; Yiadom (yellow card) 90'	Stadium: Weston Homes Stadium; Attendance: 11,520; Referee: Matt Donohue

19 February 2022 31	Derby County	1–0	Peterborough United	Derby
15:00 GMT	Lawrence (red card) 47'; Byrne (yellow card) 76'; Davies (yellow card) 80'; Sibley 90+2', (yellow card) 90+3'; Allsop (yellow card) 90+4'; Morrison (yellow card) 90+7'	Report	Coulson (yellow card) 31' (yellow-red card) 35'; Brown (yellow card) 59'; Jones (yellow card) 70'; Thompson (yellow card) 76'; Knight (yellow card) 87'	Stadium: Pride Park; Attendance: 30,251; Referee: James Linington

23 February 2022 32	Fulham	2–1	Peterborough United	Fulham
19:45 GMT	Mitrović 28' (pen.), 62'	Report	Knight (yellow card) 85'; Marriott 89'	Stadium: Craven Cottage; Attendance: 17,387; Referee: Jarred Gillett

26 February 2022 33	Peterborough United	0–3	Hull City	Peterborough
15:00 GMT	Szmodics (yellow card) 16'; Brown (yellow card) 54'; Knight (yellow card) 66'	Report	Smith 25'; Lewis-Potter 51', 70'	Stadium: Weston Homes Stadium; Attendance: 9,463; Referee: Tony Harrington

4 March 2022 34	Huddersfield Town	3–0	Peterborough United	Huddersfield
19:45 GMT	Sinani 3'; Lees 7', 72'	Report	Norburn (yellow card) 28'	Stadium: John Smith's Stadium; Attendance: 16,023; Referee: Darren Bond

8 March 2022 35	Bournemouth	1–1	Peterborough United	Kings Park
19:45 GMT	Zemura (yellow card) 33'; Christie 52'; Billing (yellow card) 65'	Report	Marriott 30'; Burrows (yellow card) 83'	Stadium: Vitality Stadium; Referee: Gavin Ward

12 March 2022 36	Peterborough United	2–2	Stoke City	Peterborough
15:00 GMT	Clarke-Harris 33', 90+1' (pen.), (yellow card) 90+4'	Report	Brown 28'; Allen (yellow card) 45+1'; Fletcher (yellow card) 70'; Baker 84' (pen.)	Stadium: Weston Homes Stadium; Attendance: 9,060; Referee: Dean Whitestone

16 March 2022 37	Peterborough United	2–3	Swansea City	Peterborough
19:45 GMT	Szmodics 51'; Knight (yellow card) 56'; Marriott 63'	Report	Obafemi 44', 71'; Christie (yellow card) 48'; Wolf (yellow card) 56'; Cabango (yellow card) 77'; Naughton (yellow card) 88'; Piroe 90+1', (yellow card) 90+9'	Stadium: Weston Homes Stadium; Attendance: 6,832; Referee: Oliver Langford

20 March 2022 38	Queens Park Rangers	1–3	Peterborough United	Shepherd's Bush
12:30 GMT	Amos 9'; Field (yellow card) 66'	Report	Clarke-Harris 39', 53' (pen.); Mumba (yellow card) 45'; Marriott 54', (yellow card) 56'; Norburn (yellow card) 67'	Stadium: Kiyan Prince Foundation Stadium; Attendance: 13,753; Referee: David Webb

2 April 2022 39	Peterborough United	0–4	Middlesbrough	Peterborough
15:00 BST	Kent (yellow card) 28'; Knight (yellow card) 35'; Grant (yellow card) 90'	Report	Tavernier 26', (yellow card) 74'; Balogun 49'; Coburn 82'; Watmore 90'	Stadium: Weston Homes Stadium; Attendance: 11,755; Referee: Leigh Doughty

5 April 2022 40	Peterborough United	1–1	Luton Town	Peterborough
19:45 BST	Fuchs (yellow card) 14'; Marriott (yellow card) 41'; Kent (yellow card) 70'; Jones (yellow card) 75'; Clarke-Harris 87'	Report	Ruddock (yellow card) 16'; Hylton 49'; Adebayo (yellow card) 90+4'	Stadium: Weston Homes Stadium; Referee: Thomas Bramall

9 April 2022 41	Bristol City	1–1	Peterborough United	Ashton Gate
15:00 BST	Atkinson 43'; Scott (yellow card) 47'	Report	Ward (red card) 59'; Clarke-Harris 65'; Edwards (yellow card) 85'	Stadium: Ashton Gate Stadium; Referee: John Brooks

15 April 2022 42	Peterborough United	2–1	Blackburn Rovers	Peterborough
15:00 BST	Fuchs (yellow card) 51'; Szmodics 83'; Marriott 87'	Report	Edun (yellow card) 22' (yellow-red card) 41'; Brereton Díaz 77' van Hecke (yellow card) 83'	Stadium: Weston Homes Stadium; Attendance: 9,426; Referee: Chris Kavanagh

18 April 2022 43	Barnsley	0–2	Peterborough United	Barnsley
15:00 BST	Palmer (yellow card) 59'	Report	Marriott 25', (yellow card) 60'; Poku (yellow card) 52'; Taylor 75'	Stadium: Oakwell Stadium; Attendance: 12,197; Referee: Darren Bond

23 April 2022 44	Peterborough United	0–1	Nottingham Forest	Peterborough
15:00 BST	Burrows (yellow card) 19'; Taylor (yellow card) 25'; Szmodics (yellow card) 67'	Report	Surridge 45', (yellow card) 73'; Colback (yellow card) 88'; Samba (yellow card) 90'	Stadium: Weston Homes Stadium; Attendance: 12,870; Referee: Michael Salisbury

30 April 2022 45	Millwall	3–0	Peterborough United	Bermondsey
15:00 BST	Afobe 53'; Knight 73' (o.g.); Saville 76'	Report		Stadium: The Den; Attendance: 16,705; Referee: Geoff Eltringham

7 May 2022	Peterborough United	5–0	Blackpool	Peterborough
15:00 BST	Ward (yellow card) 23'; Clarke-Harris 36'; Szmodics 62', 70'; Marriott 85'; Taylor 89'	Report		Stadium: Weston Homes Stadium; Attendance: 9,118; Referee: Andy Woolmer

=== FA Cup ===
Peterborough United were drawn at home to Bristol Rovers in the third round.

8 January 2022 Third round	Peterborough United	2–1	Bristol Rovers	Peterborough
15:00 GMT	Szmodics 20'; Mumba 63'; Norburn (yellow card) 79'	Report	Coutts 30' (pen.)	Stadium: Weston Homes Stadium; Attendance: 4,937; Referee: Andy Davies

5 February 2022 Fourth round	Peterborough United	2–0	Queens Park Rangers	Peterborough
15:00 GMT	Ward 25'; Clarke-Harris (yellow card) 29'; Edwards (yellow card) 45'; Fuchs (yellow card) 63'; Jones 71', (yellow card) 83'; Norburn (yellow card) 87'; Thompson (yellow card) 90+6'	Report	Dunne (yellow card) 43'; Dozzell (yellow card) 90+2'	Stadium: Weston Homes Stadium; Attendance: 10,119; Referee: David Webb

1 March 2022 Fifth round	Peterborough United	0–2	Manchester City	Peterborough
19:15 GMT	Szmodics (yellow card) 70'	Report	Aké (yellow card) 17'; Mahrez 60'; Grealish 67'; Fernandinho (yellow card) 70'	Stadium: Weston Homes Stadium; Referee: Andrew Madley

=== EFL Cup ===
Peterborough United were drawn at home to Plymouth Argyle in the first round.

10 August 2021 First round	Peterborough United	0–4	Plymouth Argyle	Peterborough
19:45 BST		Report	Hardie 23', 33'; Galloway (yellow card) 61'; Jephcott 66'; Camará 84'	Stadium: Weston Homes Stadium; Attendance: 4,021; Referee: Ben Toner

== Transfers ==
=== Transfers in ===
Date	Position	Nationality	Name	From	Fee	Ref.
28 June 2021	GK	(Wales)	David Cornell	(England) Ipswich Town	Free transfer	
29 June 2021	CM	(England)	Jorge Grant	(England) Lincoln City	Undisclosed	
1 July 2021	CF	(England)	Jack Marriott	(England) Derby County	Free transfer	
2 July 2021	CB	(England)	Josh Knight	(England) Leicester City	Undisclosed	
12 July 2021	CB	(England)	Emmanuel Fernandez	(England) Ramsgate	Undisclosed	
29 July 2021	LB	(England)	Joe Tomlinson	(England) Eastleigh	Undisclosed	
2 August 2021	AM	(Ghana)	Kwame Poku	(England) Colchester United	Undisclosed	
3 August 2021	LW	(England)	Joel Randall	(England) Exeter City	Undisclosed	
10 August 2021	CM	(Grenada)	Oliver Norburn	(England) Shrewsbury Town	Undisclosed	
11 August 2021	CM	(The Gambia)	Ethan Bojang	(England) Doncaster Rovers	Free transfer	
25 August 2021	CM	(Malaysia)	Kobe Jae Chong	(England) Sutton Coldfield Town	Free transfer	
8 September 2021	RW	(England)	Andrew Oluwabori	(England) Edgware Town	Free transfer	
21 September 2021	RW	(England)	Johnson Gyamfi	(England) Leicester City	Free transfer	
15 November 2021	RW	(England)	Kai Corbett	(England) West Ham United	Free transfer	
15 November 2021	CF	(England)	Joe Taylor	(England) King's Lynn Town	Undisclosed	
28 January 2022	DM	(Cameroon)	Jeando Fuchs	(Scotland) Dundee United	Undisclosed	

=== Loans in ===
Date from	Position	Nationality	Name	From	Date until	Ref.
31 August 2021	DM	(Republic of Ireland)	Conor Coventry	(England) West Ham United	5 January 2022 (Note: On 5 January, Coventry was recalled by parent club West Ham United.)	
6 January 2022	RB	(England)	Bali Mumba	(England) Norwich City	End of season	
11 January 2022	GK	(Germany)	Steven Benda	(Wales) Swansea City	End of season	
13 January 2022	CF	(England)	Callum Morton	(England) West Bromwich Albion	End of season	
31 January 2022	CM	(England)	Reece Brown	(England) Huddersfield Town	End of season	
31 January 2022	LB	(England)	Hayden Coulson	(England) Middlesbrough	End of season	

=== Loans out ===
Date from	Position	Nationality	Name	To	Date until	Ref.
24 July 2021	RM	(Azerbaijan)	Serhat Tasdemir	(England) Barnet	End of season	
29 July 2021	RM	(Wales)	Ryan Broom	(England) Plymouth Argyle	End of season	
25 August 2021	FW	(England)	Hameed Ishola	(England) Bedford Town	End of season	
22 October 2021	RW	(England)	Andrew Oluwabori	(England) Boreham Wood	21 November 2021	
13 November 2021	CM	(The Gambia)	Ethan Bojang	(England) Spalding United	12 December 2021	
13 November 2021	CB	(England)	Emmanuel Fernandez	(England) Spalding United	12 December 2021	
20 December 2021	GK	(Hungary)	Dániel Gyollai	(England) Maidenhead United	17 January 2022	
3 January 2022	GK	(England)	Christy Pym	(England) Stevenage	End of season	
26 January 2022	RW	(Sierra Leone)	Idris Kanu	(England) Northampton Town	End of season	
28 January 2022	DF	(England)	Charlie O'Connell	(England) Kettering Town	March 2022	
31 January 2022	RW	(Ghana)	Johnson Gyamfi	(England) Peterborough Sports		
31 January 2022	LB	(England)	Joe Tomlinson	(England) Swindon Town	End of season	

=== Transfers out ===
Date	Position	Nationality	Name	To	Fee	Ref.
13 May 2021	GK	(England)	Mark Tyler	Retired		
24 June 2021	AM	(Scotland)	Flynn Clarke	(England) Norwich City	Undisclosed	
30 June 2021	LB	(England)	Frazer Blake-Tracy	(England) Burton Albion	Released	
30 June 2021	CB	(England)	Sam Cartwright	(England) St Ives Town	Released	
30 June 2021	CM	(England)	Archie Jones	(England) Bishop's Stortford	Released	
30 June 2021	RB	(England)	Niall Mason	(Qatar) Lusail SC	Released	
30 June 2021	CM	(England)	Louis Reed	(England) Swindon Town	Released	
30 June 2021	CF	(England)	Bradley Rolt	(England) Brackley Town	Released	
19 July 2021	MF	(Portugal)	Adler Nascimento	(England) Crystal Palace	Undisclosed	
20 July 2021	CF	(Sudan)	Mohamed Eisa	(England) Milton Keynes Dons	Undisclosed	
21 August 2021	RB	(England)	Shaun Keane	(England) Bedford Town	Free transfer	
31 August 2021	CM	(Scotland)	Ethan Hamilton	(England) Accrington Stanley	Undisclosed	
22 December 2021	MF	(England)	Nicky Gyimah-Bio	(England) Sunderland	Undisclosed	
12 January 2022	GK	(Hungary)	Dániel Gyollai	(England) Maidenhead United	Free transfer	
31 January 2022	LW	(Scotland)	Siriki Dembélé	(England) Bournemouth	Undisclosed	
