= Hevertton Santos =

Portuguese footballer (born 2000)

Personal information
- Full name: Hevertton Ciriaco Santos
- Date of birth: 1 February 2001 (age 25)
- Place of birth: São Mateus, Brazil
- Height: 1.82 m (6 ft 0 in)
- Position: Right-back

Team information
- Current team: Levski Sofia
- Number: 2

Youth career
- 2010–2011: CIF
- 2011–2020: Sporting CP

Senior career*
Years	Team	Apps	(Gls)
2020–2022	Sporting CP B	34	(2)
2022–2024	Estrela da Amadora	41	(0)
2024–2026	Queens Park Rangers	6	(0)
2025	→ Vitória de Guimarães (loan)	6	(0)
2025–2026	→ Gil Vicente (loan)	24	(0)
2026–	Levski Sofia	7	(0)
- * Club domestic league appearances and goals as of 22 November 2026

Hevertton Ciriaco Santos (born 1 February 2001), known mononymously as Hevertton, is a Brazilian professional footballer who plays as a right-back for Bulgarian First League club Levski Sofia.

== Professional career ==
=== Early career ===
Santos was born in Brazil, and moved to Portugal at a young age. He began playing football with CIF in 2010, and the following year moved to Sporting CP where he finished his development. On 7 March 2019, he signed his first professional contract with the club. He started training with Sporting CP B in 2020, and on 3 August 2021 extended his professional contract for 3 years. On 4 July 2022, Santos was part of Sporting's senior team preseason training.

=== Estrela da Amadora ===
On 25 July 2022, Santos transferred to Estrela da Amadora in the Liga Portugal 2 on a 2-year contract. He helped Estrela da Amadora achieve promotion into the Primeira Liga for the 2023–24 season.

=== Queens Park Rangers ===
On 5 July 2024, Santos signed for EFL Championship club Queens Park Rangers on a free transfer after the expiry of his Estrela contract.

On 29 January 2025, Santos returned to Portugal, joining Vitória de Guimarães on loan for the remainder of the season.

On 11 July 2025, Santos joined Primeira Liga side Gil Vicente on a season-long loan deal.

On 18 September 2025, he was named as the 1195th player to feature for Queens Park Rangers.

== Career statistics ==
As of end of 2024–25 season

Appearances and goals by club, season and competition
Club	Season	League			National Cup		League Cup		Other		Total	
Club	Season	Division	Apps	Goals	Apps	Goals	Apps	Goals	Apps	Goals	Apps	Goals
Sporting CP B	2020–21	Campeonato de Portugal	8	1	—		—		—		8	1
Sporting CP B	2021–22	Liga 3	26	1	—		—		—		26	1
Sporting CP B	Club total		34	2	0	0	0	0	0	0	34	2
Estrela da Amadora	2022–23	Liga Portugal 2	12	0	0	0	2	0	1 (Note: Appearances in Liga Portugal 2 play-offs)	0	15	0
Estrela da Amadora	2023–24	Primeira Liga	29	0	2	0	1	0	—		32	0
Estrela da Amadora	Club total		41	0	2	0	3	0	1	0	47	0
Queens Park Rangers	2024–25	Championship	6	0	0	0	3	1	—		9	1
Vitória de Guimarães (loan)	2024–25	Primeira Liga	6	0	0	0	0	0	2 (Note: Appearance(s) in UEFA Conference League)	0	8	0
Career Total			87	2	2	0	6	1	3	0	97	2
