= Harrison Ashby =

Scottish footballer (born 2001)

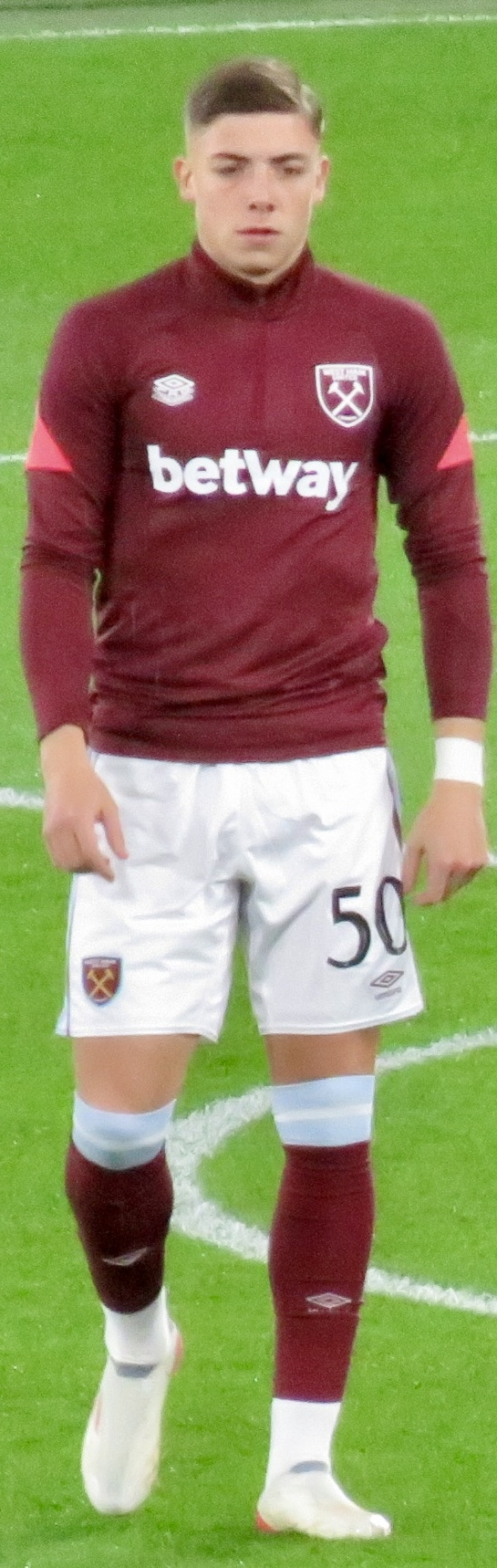
- Ashby warming up for West Ham United in 2021

Personal information
- Full name: Harrison Charles Ashby
- Date of birth: 14 November 2001 (age 25)
- Place of birth: Milton Keynes, England
- Height: 5 ft 10 in (1.79 m)
- Position: Right back

Team information
- Current team: Luton Town (on loan from Newcastle United)
- Number: 33

Youth career
- Chelsea
- 2010–2020: West Ham United

Senior career*
Years	Team	Apps	(Gls)
2020–2023	West Ham United	1	(0)
2023–	Newcastle United	0	(0)
2023–2024	→ Swansea City (loan)	13	(1)
2024–2025	→ Queens Park Rangers (loan)	29	(0)
2026	→ Bradford City (loan)	8	(0)
2026–	→ Luton Town (loan)	8	(0)

International career
2018	Scotland U17	1	(0)
2019	Scotland U19	5	(0)
2020–2021	Scotland U21	3	(1)
- * Club domestic league appearances and goals as of 22:51, 3 November 2026 (UTC)

Harrison Charles Ashby (born 14 November 2001) is a professional footballer who plays as a right-back for EFL League One club Luton Town, on loan from Premier League club Newcastle United. Born in England, he has represented Scotland at youth level.

== Club career ==
=== West Ham United ===
Prior to signing for West Ham United at the age of nine, Ashby was on the books at Chelsea. Ashby signed his first professional contract with West Ham in the summer of 2020.

He made his debut on 15 September 2020, replacing Ben Johnson in the 84th minute of the EFL Cup second round fixture versus Charlton Athletic, a match won 3–0 by the Premier League side. On 15 December 2021, Ashby made his Premier League debut as a substitute for Pablo Fornals in a 0–2 away defeat to Arsenal.

=== Newcastle United ===
On 31 January 2023, Ashby signed for Newcastle United for an undisclosed fee. The deal was later reported to be worth up to £3 million.

On 4 August 2023, Ashby joined Swansea City on a season-long loan.

Ashby scored his first senior competitive goal on 26 August 2023, while on loan at Swansea City. He scored the goal in a Championship match against Preston North End, which Swansea lost 2–1.

On 30 August 2024, Ashby moved to Queens Park Rangers on a season-long loan.

In January 2026, Ashby signed on loan for Bradford City. Ashby only had limited game time throughout January due to strong competition in the squad.

On 9 July 2026, Ashby joined League One side Luton Town on a season-long loan.

== International career ==
Ashby qualifies for Scotland due to Scottish grandparents on his mother's side, and represented Scotland at under-17 and under-19 levels. On 23 September 2020, Ashby received his first Scotland U21 call-up. He scored his first goal for the U21s on 13 October 2020, rounding off the scoring in a 7–0 win away to San Marino in a Euro U21 qualifier.

== Style of play ==
Ashby's captain at West Ham, Mark Noble, praised Ashby's "real physical stature" and his technical ability, saying "technically he is also very good, and for him it's just about getting that experience around us and around the first team. When he's come in, he has looked really strong. He fully deserved his Premier League debut this year".

== Personal life ==
Ashby is the son of former Watford, Brentford and Gillingham defender Barry Ashby.

== Career statistics ==
As of match played 17 November 2026

Appearances and goals by club, season and competition
Club	Season	League			FA Cup		EFL Cup		Other		Total	
Club	Season	Division	Apps	Goals	Apps	Goals	Apps	Goals	Apps	Goals	Apps	Goals
West Ham United U21	2019–20	—			—		—		1 (Note: Appearance(s) in EFL Trophy)	0	1	0
West Ham United U21	2020–21	—			—		—		1	0	1	0
West Ham United U21	2021–22	—			—		—		3	1	3	1
West Ham United U21	2022–23	—			—		—		1	0	1	0
West Ham United U21	Total		—		—		—		6	1	6	1
West Ham United	2020–21	Premier League	0	0	0	0	2	0	—		2	0
West Ham United	2021–22	Premier League	1	0	0	0	1	0	1 (Note: Appearance in UEFA Europa League)	0	3	0
West Ham United	2022–23	Premier League	0	0	0	0	0	0	2 (Note: Appearances in UEFA Europa Conference League)	0	2	0
West Ham United	Total		1	0	0	0	3	0	3	0	7	0
Newcastle United	2022–23	Premier League	0	0	0	0	0	0	—		0	0
Newcastle United	2023–24	Premier League	0	0	0	0	0	0	0	0	0	0
Newcastle United	2024–25	Premier League	0	0	0	0	0	0	—		0	0
Newcastle United	2025–26	Premier League	0	0	0	0	0	0	0	0	0	0
Newcastle United	2026–27	Premier League	0	0	0	0	0	0	—		0	0
Newcastle United	Total		0	0	0	0	0	0	0	0	0	0
Newcastle United U21	2025–26	—			—		—		1	0	1	0
Swansea City (loan)	2023–24	Championship	13	1	1	0	2	0	—		16	1
Queens Park Rangers (loan)	2024–25	Championship	29	0	1	0	1	0	—		31	0
Bradford City (loan)	2025–26	League One	8	0	0	0	0	0	0	0	8	0
Luton Town (loan)	2026–27	League One	8	0	1	0	2	0	3	0	14	0
Career total			59	1	3	0	8	0	13	1	83	2
