= Hayden Coulson =

English footballer (born 1998)

Personal information
- Full name: Hayden Ross Coulson
- Date of birth: 17 June 1998 (age 28)
- Place of birth: Gateshead, England
- Height: 1.80 m (5 ft 11 in)
- Positions: Left-back; left midfielder

Team information
- Current team: Blackpool
- Number: 15

Youth career
- 2012–2016: Middlesbrough

Senior career*
Years	Team	Apps	(Gls)
2016–2024	Middlesbrough	48	(1)
2018	→ St Mirren (loan)	6	(0)
2019	→ Cambridge United (loan)	14	(0)
2021–2022	→ Ipswich Town (loan)	6	(0)
2022	→ Peterborough United (loan)	6	(0)
2022–2023	→ Aberdeen (loan)	28	(0)
2024	→ Blackpool (loan)	17	(2)
2024–	Blackpool	68	(1)

International career^{‡}
2013–2014	England U16	7	(0)
2014–2015	England U17	6	(0)
2016	England U18	2	(0)
- * Club domestic league appearances and goals as of 00:06, 13 May 2026 (UTC) ‡ National team caps and goals as of 00:07, 6 June 2023 (UTC)

Hayden Ross Coulson (born 17 June 1998) is an English professional footballer who plays as a defender for EFL League One side Blackpool.

== Club career ==
=== Middlesbrough ===
Coulson made five appearances for Middlesbrough in the 2015–16 UEFA Youth League, before signing his first professional contract with the club on 1 July 2016.

==== St Mirren (loan) ====
On 9 July 2018, Coulson joined newly promoted Scottish Premiership side St Mirren on a season-long loan. He made his debut soon after, on 13 July, starting in a goalless draw with Kilmarnock at Rugby Park in the Scottish League Cup. The club eventually emerged as 3–2 winners in the penalty shootout, with Coulson scoring one of their penalties. He went on to score his first goal for the club on 28 July 2018, in the first minute against Dumbarton in a 6–0 League Cup win. Coulson returned to Middlesbrough on 17 October 2018 after his loan was cut short, having made 11 appearances for the side in all competitions, scoring once.

==== Cambridge United (loan) ====
On 31 January 2019, Coulson joined League Two club Cambridge United on loan until the end of the season.

==== Return to Middlesbrough ====
Following his return from his loan at Cambridge, Coulson broke into the Middlesbrough squad for the 2019–20 season. He made his league debut for the club on the opening day of the season in a 3–3 away draw with Luton Town. On 1 February 2020, Coulson scored a first league goal of his career, equalising fifteen minutes from time in a 1–1 draw with Blackburn Rovers. Coulson appeared 29 times in the EFL Championship season, including six times after the return following a break on account of the COVID-19 pandemic.

==== Ipswich Town (loan) ====
Coulson joined League One side Ipswich Town on loan on 9 August 2021. On 31 January 2022, Coulson was recalled by Middlesbrough having made six appearances for the club.

==== Peterborough United (loan) ====
Following his recall from Ipswich Town, Coulson joined Championship side Peterborough United on loan until the end of the 2021–22 season.

==== Aberdeen (loan) ====
On 26 July 2022, Coulson joined Scottish Premier League side Aberdeen, on a season-long loan.

==== Blackpool (loan) ====
On 8 January 2024, Coulson joined League One side Blackpool on loan until the end of the 2023–24 season.

=== Blackpool ===
Coulson joined Blackpool on a permanent basis, for an undisclosed fee, on 27 June 2024. He signed a three-year contract.

== International career ==
Coulson has represented England at U16, U17 and U18 level. Coulson earned a call up to the U19 in 2016. He made his national-team debut in a 1–0 victory over Northern Ireland U16.

== Career statistics ==
As of end of 2025–26 season

Appearances and goals by club, season and competition
Club	Season	League			National Cup (Note: Includes FA Cup, Scottish Cup)		League Cup (Note: Includes EFL Cup, Scottish League Cup)		Other		Total	
Club	Season	Division	Apps	Goals	Apps	Goals	Apps	Goals	Apps	Goals	Apps	Goals
Middlesbrough U21	2016–17	–			–		–		1 (Note: Appearance(s) in EFL Trophy)	0	1	0
Middlesbrough U21	2017–18	–			–		–		2	0	2	0
Middlesbrough U21	Total		–		–		–		3	0	3	0
Middlesbrough	2018–19	Championship	0	0	0	0	0	0	–		0	0
Middlesbrough	2019–20	Championship	29	1	1	0	0	0	–		30	1
Middlesbrough	2020–21	Championship	17	0	1	0	1	0	–		19	0
Middlesbrough	2021–22	Championship	0	0	0	0	0	0	–		0	0
Middlesbrough	2022–23	Championship	0	0	0	0	0	0	–		0	0
Middlesbrough	2023–24	Championship	2	0	1	0	1	0	–		4	0
Middlesbrough	Total		48	1	3	0	2	0	–		53	1
St Mirren (loan)	2018–19	Scottish Premiership	6	0	0	0	5	1	–		11	1
Cambridge United (loan)	2018–19	League Two	14	0	0	0	0	0	0	0	14	0
Ipswich Town (loan)	2021–22	League One	6	0	0	0	0	0	0	0	6	0
Peterborough United (loan)	2021–22	Championship	6	0	2	0	0	0	–		8	0
Aberdeen (loan)	2022–23	Scottish Premiership	28	0	1	0	2	1	–		31	1
Blackpool (loan)	2023–24	League One	17	2	0	0	0	0	2	0	19	2
Blackpool	2024–25	League One	35	0	1	0	3	1	2	0	41	1
Blackpool	2025–26	League One	33	1	2	0	1	0	2	0	38	1
Blackpool	Total		68	1	3	0	4	1	4	0	79	2
Career total			193	4	9	0	13	3	9	0	220	7
