= Basingstoke College of Technology =

Basingstoke College of Technology (BCoT)

Location
- Worting Road; Basingstoke, Hampshire, RG21 8TN; United Kingdom
- Coordinates: 51°15′50″N 1°05′50″W

Information
- Type: Further education college
- Local authority: Hampshire County Council
- Principal: Lorraine Heath
- Gender: Coeducational
- Age: 16+
- Website: http://www.bcot.ac.uk/

Basingstoke College of Technology (BCoT) is a further education college in Basingstoke, Hampshire, United Kingdom. The college is located in the centre of Basingstoke on Worting Road, and consists of three campus buildings: North, South, and STEM. The college is listed as a Centre of Vocational Excellence in certain areas, and was rated as 'Good' by Ofsted.

== Courses ==
BCoT offers a wide range of vocational courses and qualifications on both a full-time and part-time basis. The courses are broken down into subject areas which include:

- Access to Higher Education
- Animal Management
- Art and Design
- Automotive
- Beauty Therapy and Media Make-Up
- Business
- Childcare
- Computing and IT
- Construction
- Counselling
- Education and Training
- Engineering
- English and Maths
- Foundation Learning
- Hair and Barbering
- Health and Social Care
- Hospitality and Catering
- Media and Games Design
- Public Services
- Science
- Specialist Provision
- Travel and Tourism

== Facilities ==
BCoT is well known for its wide range of industry-standard facilities which includes an in-house restaurant, known as The Restaurant at BCoT. The Restaurant at BCoT is open to the public and provides students with the chance to learn and gain experience in a professional environment.

Evolve Salon is BCoT's on-site training salon, which is also open to the public and is run by the Beauty Therapy and Hairdressing department. The Mike Taylor Barbering College is a training barbers for barbering students which is also open to the public and run in partnership with leading UK barber Mike Taylor.

As well as a restaurant, salon and barbers, the College also has an Animal Discover Centre, air cabin crew training room, onsite professional nursery (which is open to the public), a library, gym, science labs, large automotive workshop, three engineering workshops, lecture theatre and dedicated Art and Design studios.

Students are able to buy hot and cold food from an in-house catering outlet known as Taste BCoT who operate a refectory on the South Campus and a cafe on the North Campus.

== Support for Students ==
Students have access to an onsite professional counsellor, nurse, careers centre and English and Maths support hub, as well as a dedicated personal tutor.
