= Jonathan Varane =

Martiniquais footballer (born 2001)

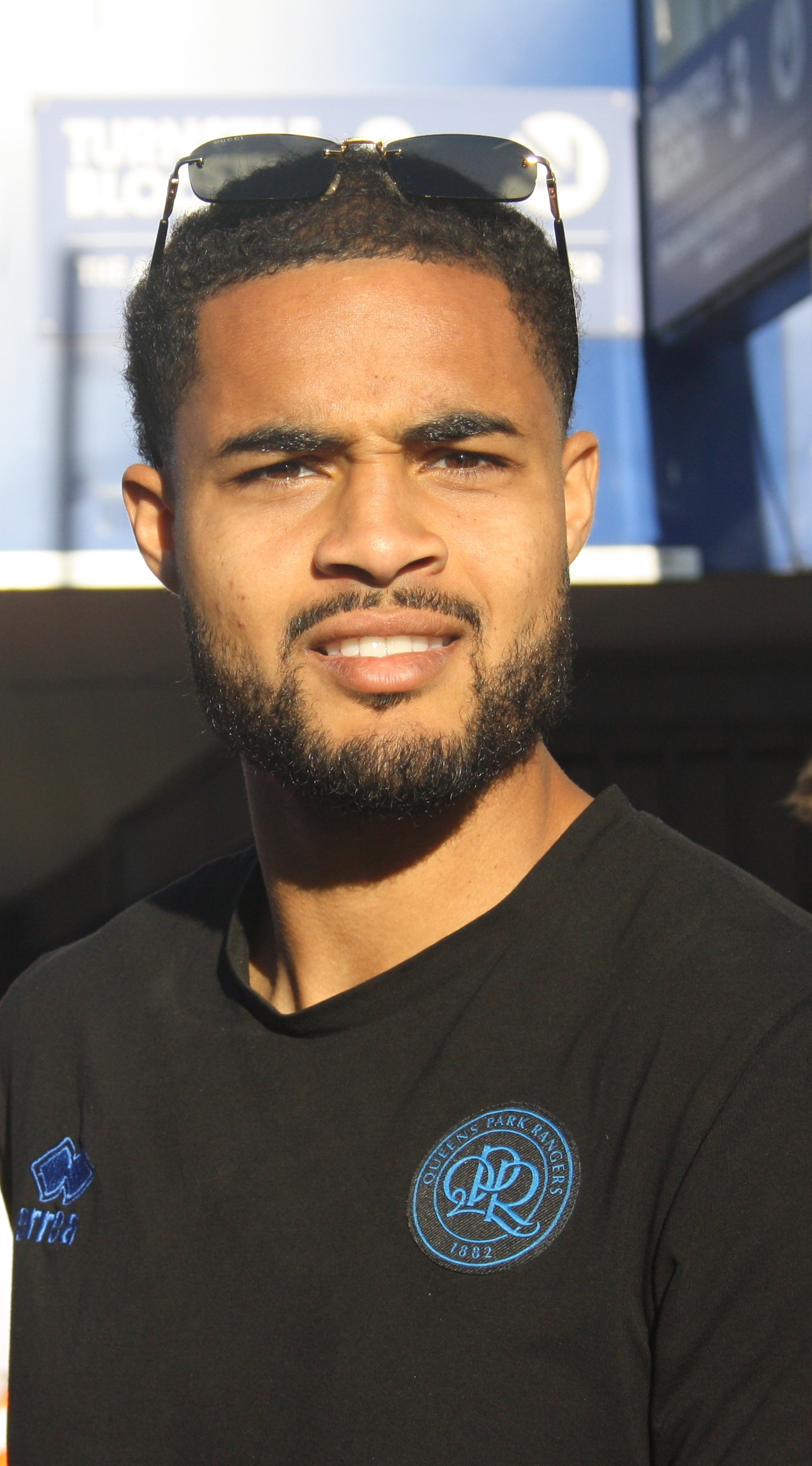
- Varane in 2026

Personal information
- Full name: Jonathan Raymond François Varane
- Date of birth: 9 September 2001 (age 25)
- Place of birth: Lille, France
- Height: 1.90 m (6 ft 3 in)
- Position: Defensive midfielder

Team information
- Current team: Queens Park Rangers
- Number: 40

Youth career
- 2007–2021: Lens

Senior career*
| Years | Team | Apps | (Gls) |
| 2020–2022 | Lens II | 10 | (0) |
| 2021–2022 | Lens | 1 | (0) |
| 2022 | → Rodez II (loan) | 3 | (0) |
| 2022 | → Rodez (loan) | 6 | (0) |
| 2022–2023 | Sporting Gijón B | 15 | (1) |
| 2023–2024 | Sporting Gijón | 39 | (0) |
| 2024– | Queens Park Rangers | 84 | (2) |

International career^{‡}
| 2024– | Martinique | 6 | (1) |
- * Club domestic league appearances and goals as of 04:18, 4 November 2026 (UTC) ‡ National team caps and goals as of 6 October 2026

Jonathan Raymond François Varane (born 9 September 2001) is a professional footballer who plays as a defensive midfielder for EFL Championship club Queens Park Rangers. Born in France, he plays for the Martinique national team.

== Club career ==
=== Lens ===
Varane is a youth product of Lens, having joined the youth academy in 2007. He signed his first professional contract with the club on 18 May 2021. He made his professional debut with Lens in a 3–2 Ligue 1 loss to Nantes on 10 December 2021, coming on as a sub in the 90+2 minute.

==== Loan to Rodez ====
On 24 January 2022, Varane joined Ligue 2 Rodez on loan until the end of the season. He played six times for the club as they narrowly avoided relegation.

=== Sporting Gijón ===
On 24 August 2022, Varane signed with Spanish club Sporting de Gijón, being initially assigned to the reserves in Tercera Federación. He made his first team debut on 3 January of the following year, replacing Nacho Martín in a 2–0 home win over Rayo Vallecano, for the season's Copa del Rey.

After the arrival of Miguel Ángel Ramírez as manager, Varane started to feature more regularly with the first team. On 31 May 2023, he signed a new contract with the club until 2027, being definitely promoted to the main squad.

=== Queens Park Rangers ===
On 4 August 2024, Varane signed for EFL Championship club Queens Park Rangers for an undisclosed fee. On 10 August, he made his debut for the club, as a substitute, in a 3–1 loss against West Bromwich Albion in the league. On 11 January 2025, he scored his first goal for the club in a 6–2 loss to Leicester City in the third round of the FA Cup. On 6 December 2025, he scored his first league goal for the club in a 3–1 victory over West Bromwich Albion at Loftus Road.

== International career ==
Born in France, Varane plays international football for Martinique, qualifying through his Martinique-born father. He made his debut on 11 October 2024, playing 73 minutes of a 0–1 away victory against Guadeloupe in a 2024–25 CONCACAF Nations League group stage match.

== Personal life ==
Varane is of Martiniquais descent through his father. He is the half brother of former French international footballer Raphaël Varane.

== Career statistics ==
=== Club ===
As of match played 3 November 2026

Appearances and goals by club, season and competition
| Club | Season | League | | | National cup (Note: Includes Copa del Rey, FA Cup) | | League cup (Note: Includes EFL Cup) | | Other | | Total | |
| Club | Season | Division | Apps | Goals | Apps | Goals | Apps | Goals | Apps | Goals | Apps | Goals |
|---|---|---|---|---|---|---|---|---|---|---|---|---|
| Lens II | 2020–21 | Championnat National 2 | 2 | 0 | — | | — | | — | | 2 | 0 |
| Lens II | 2021–22 | Championnat National 2 | 8 | 0 | — | | — | | — | | 8 | 0 |
| Lens II | Total | | 10 | 0 | — | | — | | — | | 10 | 0 |
| Lens | 2021–22 | Ligue 1 | 1 | 0 | 0 | 0 | — | | — | | 1 | 0 |
| Rodez II (loan) | 2021–22 | Championnat National 3 | 3 | 0 | — | | — | | — | | 3 | 0 |
| Rodez (loan) | 2021–22 | Ligue 2 | 6 | 0 | 0 | 0 | — | | — | | 6 | 0 |
| Sporting Gijón B | 2022–23 | Tercera Federación | 15 | 1 | — | | — | | — | | 15 | 1 |
| Sporting Gijón | 2022–23 | Segunda División | 17 | 0 | 1 | 0 | — | | — | | 18 | 0 |
| Sporting Gijón | 2023–24 | Segunda División | 22 | 0 | 2 | 0 | — | | 1 (Note: Appearance in Segunda División play-offs) | 0 | 25 | 0 |
| Sporting Gijón | Total | | 39 | 0 | 3 | 0 | — | | 1 | 0 | 43 | 0 |
| Queens Park Rangers | 2024–25 | EFL Championship | 39 | 0 | 1 | 1 | 3 | 0 | — | | 43 | 1 |
| Queens Park Rangers | 2025–26 | EFL Championship | 36 | 1 | 0 | 0 | 0 | 0 | — | | 36 | 1 |
| Queens Park Rangers | 2026–27 | EFL Championship | 9 | 1 | 0 | 0 | 1 | 0 | — | | 10 | 1 |
| Queens Park Rangers | Total | | 84 | 2 | 1 | 1 | 4 | 0 | — | | 89 | 3 |
| Career total | | | 158 | 3 | 4 | 1 | 4 | 0 | 1 | 0 | 167 | 4 |

=== International goals ===
As of 2 October 2026

| Goal | Date | Venue | Opponent | Score | Result | Competition |
|---|---|---|---|---|---|---|
| 1. | 2 October 2026 | Stade Pierre-Aliker, Fort-de-France, Martinque | Honduras | 1–1 | 2–1 | 2026–27 CONCACAF Nations League A |
