= Jimmy Dunne (footballer, born 1997) =

Irish professional footballer

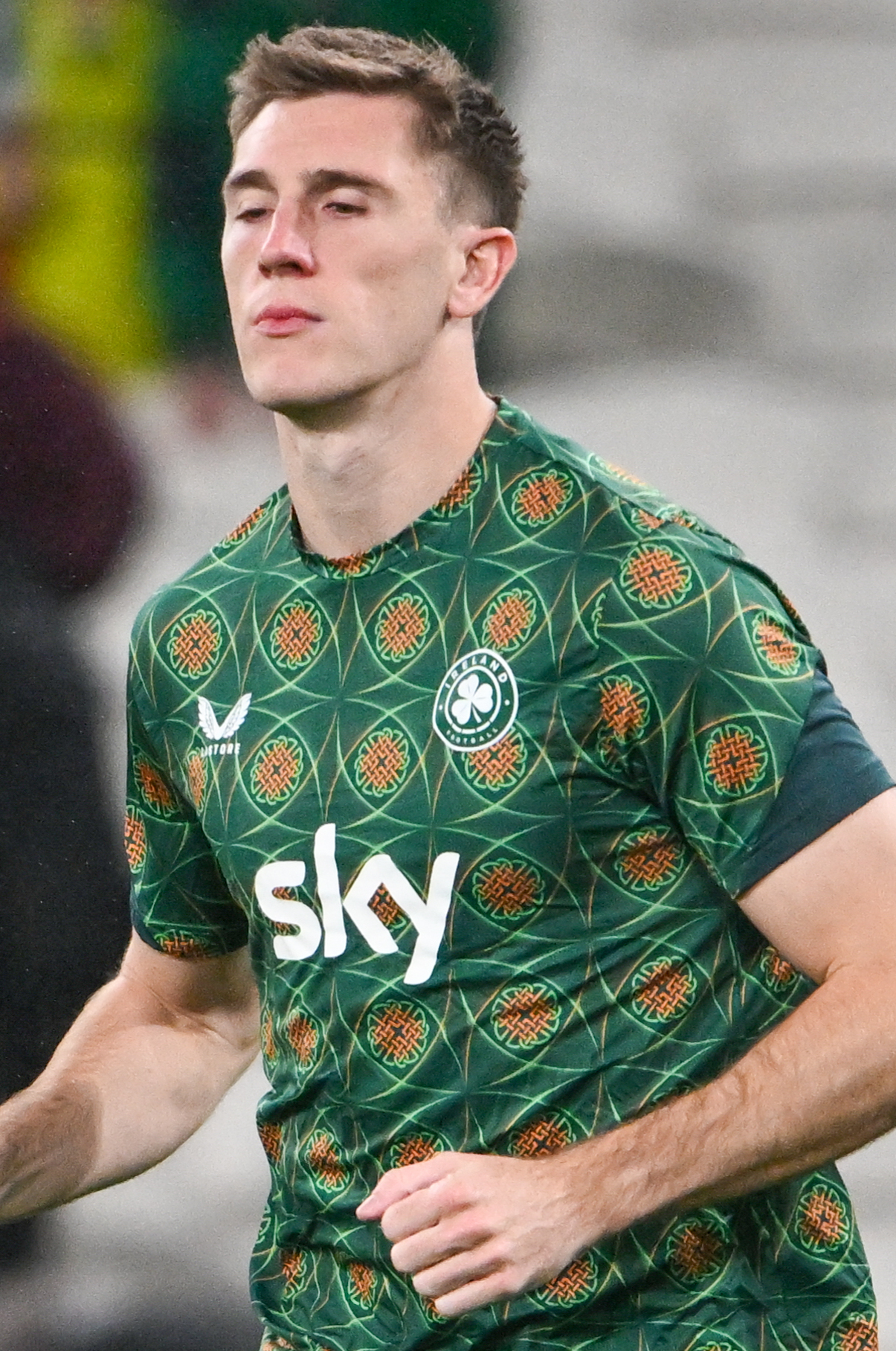
- Dunne with the Republic of Ireland in 2025

Personal information
- Full name: James Gerard Dunne
- Date of birth: 19 October 1997 (age 29)
- Place of birth: Dundalk, Ireland
- Height: 1.83 m (6 ft 0 in)
- Position: Defender

Team information
- Current team: Queens Park Rangers
- Number: 3

Youth career
- 2003–2007: Rock Celtic
- 2007–2008: Manchester United
- 2008–2010: St. Kevin's Boys
- 2010–2013: Rock Celtic
- 2013–2016: Manchester United
- 2016–2017: Burnley

Senior career*
Years	Team	Apps	(Gls)
2017–2021	Burnley	3	(1)
2017–2018	→ Barrow (loan)	21	(2)
2018	→ Accrington Stanley (loan)	20	(0)
2018–2019	→ Heart of Midlothian (loan)	12	(2)
2019	→ Sunderland (loan)	12	(1)
2019–2020	→ Fleetwood Town (loan)	9	(1)
2021–	Queens Park Rangers	205	(17)

International career^{‡}
2018	Republic of Ireland U21	2	(0)
2025–	Republic of Ireland	4	(0)
- * Club domestic league appearances and goals as of 13:37, 8 November 2026 (UTC) ‡ National team caps and goals as of 21:48, 4 October 2026 (UTC)

James Gerard Dunne (born 19 October 1997) is an Irish professional footballer who plays as a defender for EFL Championship club Queens Park Rangers and the Republic of Ireland national team.

Dunne played locally in Ireland before joining the youth set-up at Manchester United in 2007. After transferring to Burnley in 2016, he spent time on loan at Barrow (where he made his senior debut in August 2017) and Accrington Stanley (where he made his Football League debut in January 2018).

== Club career ==
Born in Dundalk, Dunne began his career with Rock Celtic before joining the Manchester United Academy in Belfast at the age of 10. He later joined St Kevin's Boys for two years, returning to Rock Celtic before signing for Manchester United in 2013.

=== Burnley ===
In July 2016, Dunne signed a two-year contract (with a further year's option in the club's favour) with Burnley. In July 2017, he moved to National League side Barrow on a six-month loan. He made his senior debut on 5 August 2017.

In early January 2018, the club confirmed Dunne's loan would not be extended and he would return to parent club Burnley. Later that month he joined EFL League Two club Accrington Stanley on loan for the remainder of the season. He made his Football League debut on 6 January 2018.

On 21 August 2018, Dunne joined Scottish Premiership side Heart of Midlothian (Hearts) on a six-month loan deal. His loan ended in January 2019. A few days later he moved on loan to Sunderland. In September 2019 he moved on loan to Fleetwood Town.

On 17 September 2020, Dunne made his senior debut for Burnley in the second round of the EFL Cup, in a 1–1 draw against Sheffield United which Burnley eventually won on penalties. He scored on his Premier League debut on 20 September 2020, in a 4–2 defeat away at Leicester City.

=== Queens Park Rangers ===
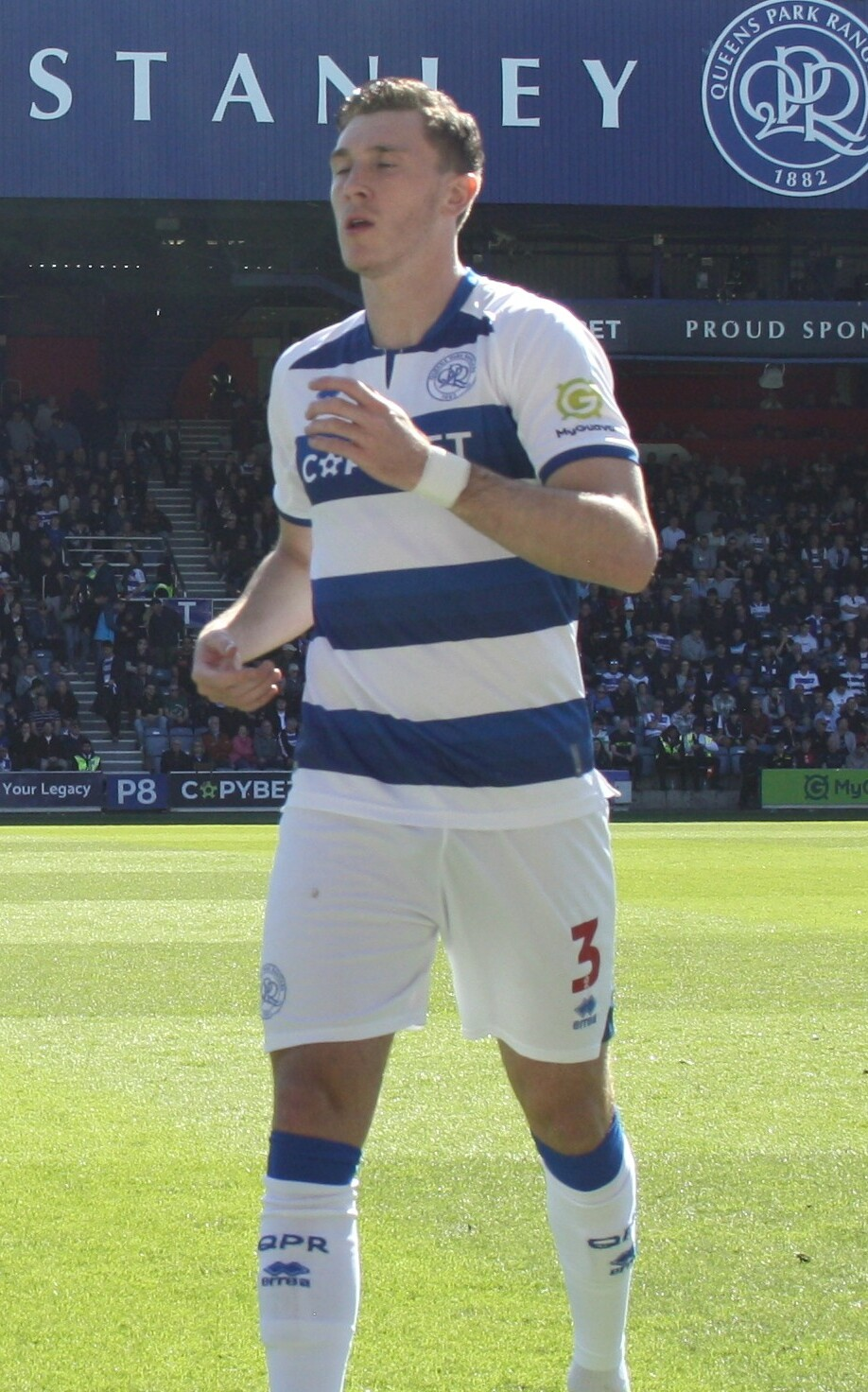
Dunne with Queens Park Rangers in 2025

On 13 July 2021, Dunne joined Queens Park Rangers from Burnley for an undisclosed fee, signing a three-year contract with the option of a further year. He quickly established himself in the side, making 38 league appearances during the 2021–22 season as QPR finished 11th in the Championship. He scored his first goal for the club on 2 October 2021, netting in a 3–2 victory over Preston North End.

Dunne remained a regular during the 2022–23 season, making 40 league appearances and scoring twice as QPR finished 20th. He signed a new contract in June 2023, extending his stay at the club.

Ahead of the 2023–24 season, Dunne dislocated his shoulder in a pre-season friendly in August, delaying his return to competitive action until September. Following a poor start to the season, QPR's fortunes improved under new manager Martí Cifuentes, who moved Dunne from his usual centre-back position to right-back. The positional change became a turning point in his season, as he helped the club move away from the relegation zone.

On 29 March 2024, Dunne scored a 92nd-minute winner from approximately 25 yards in a 2–1 victory over fellow relegation-threatened side Birmingham City. The goal was subsequently voted QPR's Goal of the Season. At the club's end-of-season awards, he was also named Junior Hoops' Player of the Year and received the PFA Men's Community Champion of the Year award.

Dunne enjoyed an especially successful 2024–25 season, making 45 league appearances and scoring five goals as QPR finished 15th in the Championship. His performances earned him both the club's supporters' Player of the Season and Players' Player of the Year awards, as well as retaining the Junior Hoops' Player of the Year award. In March 2025, he made his senior international debut for the Republic of Ireland against Bulgaria.

On 18 June 2025, Dunne signed a new contract with QPR after attracting interest from Sheffield United earlier in the year. The following month, he was named club captain ahead of the 2025–26 season. During the season, he continued to contribute goals from defence, including a header in a 2–1 victory over Birmingham City on 9 December 2025 and an equaliser in a 1–1 draw away to Portsmouth later that month. He made 39 league appearances and scored three goals during the campaign.

== International career ==
In March 2018, Dunne received a call-up to the Republic of Ireland under-21 side for the first time, making his debut on 22 March 2018 in a 3–1 friendly win over Iceland, replacing Corey Whelan as a substitute late in the game.

On 6 November 2018, Dunne was named in the provisional senior Republic of Ireland squad for the first time for the friendly match against Northern Ireland on 15 November and the UEFA Nations League match against Denmark on 19 November 2018. He was omitted from the final squad, and was linked with a call-up to the Northern Ireland team, for whom he qualifies through the grandparent rule.

He was called up again by the Republic of Ireland in March 2019 but was not capped. On 23 March 2025, he made his long-awaited senior debut in a 2–1 win against Bulgaria in the 2nd leg of the UEFA Nations League relegation playoff.

== Career statistics ==
=== Club ===
As of match played 7 November 2026

Appearances and goals by club, season and competition
Club	Season	League			National Cup (Note: Includes FA Cup)		League Cup (Note: Includes EFL Cup and Scottish League Cup)		Other		Total	
Club	Season	Division	Apps	Goals	Apps	Goals	Apps	Goals	Apps	Goals	Apps	Goals
Burnley	2017–18	Premier League	0	0	0	0	0	0	—		0	0
Burnley	2018–19	Premier League	0	0	0	0	0	0	0	0	0	0
Burnley	2019–20	Premier League	0	0	0	0	0	0	—		0	0
Burnley	2020–21	Premier League	3	1	2	0	2	0	—		7	1
Burnley	Total		3	1	2	0	2	0	0	0	7	1
Barrow (loan)	2017–18	National League	21	2	1	0	—		1 (Note: Appearance in FA Trophy)	0	23	2
Accrington Stanley (loan)	2017–18	League Two	20	0	—		—		—		20	0
Heart of Midlothian (loan)	2018–19	Scottish Premiership	12	2	—		2	0	—		14	2
Sunderland (loan)	2018–19	League One	12	1	—		—		2 (Note: Appearance in EFL Trophy)	0	14	1
Fleetwood Town (loan)	2019–20	League One	9	1	—		—		2	0	11	1
Queens Park Rangers	2021–22	Championship	38	3	2	0	3	0	—		43	3
Queens Park Rangers	2022–23	Championship	40	2	1	0	1	0	—		42	2
Queens Park Rangers	2023–24	Championship	29	1	1	0	0	0	—		30	1
Queens Park Rangers	2024–25	Championship	45	5	0	0	3	0	—		48	5
Queens Park Rangers	2025–26	Championship	39	3	1	0	0	0	—		40	3
Queens Park Rangers	2026–27	Championship	14	3	0	0	1	0	—		15	3
Queens Park Rangers	Total		205	17	5	0	8	0	0	0	218	17
Career total			281	24	8	0	13	0	5	0	308	24

=== International ===
As of match played 4 October 2026

Appearances and goals by national team and year
National team	Year	Apps	Goals
Republic of Ireland	2025	2	0
Republic of Ireland	2026	2	0
Total		4	0

== Honours ==
Accrington Stanley

- EFL League Two: 2017–18

Sunderland

- EFL Trophy runner-up: 2018–19

Individual

- Queens Park Rangers Player of the Year: 2024–25
- Queens Park Rangers Goal of the Season: 2023–24
