= 2026–27 Ipswich Town F.C. season =

English football club season

Ipswich Town
2026–27 season
- Owner: Gamechanger 20 Ltd
- Chairman: Mark Ashton
- Manager: Gary O'Neil
- Stadium: Portman Road
- Premier League: 16th
- FA Cup: Third round
- EFL Cup: Third round
- Top goalscorer: League: Five players (2 each); All: Seven players (2 each)
- Biggest win: 3–1 (vs Leicester City (H), EFL Cup, 25 August 2026)
- Biggest defeat: 2–5 (vs Manchester United (A), Premier League, 30 August 2026)
Home colours	Away colours	Third colours

The 2026–27 season is the 149th season in the history of Ipswich Town Football Club, and their first season back in the Premier League since the 2024–25 campaign, following promotion from the Championship in the preceding season. In addition to the domestic league, the club is also competing in the FA Cup and the EFL Cup.

== Managerial changes ==
Prior to the season starting, it was announced that after four-and-a-half years at the club, Kieran McKenna would step down as manager and football management as a whole to focus his time with his family. On 23 June 2026, Town announced the signing of Gary O'Neil from Ligue 1 side Strasbourg as the new manager on a three year deal.

== First-team key staff ==
Position	Name
Manager	(England) Gary O'Neil
Assistant Manager	(England) Tim Jenkins
First-Team Coaches	(Nigeria) Sone Aluko
First-Team Coaches	(England) Ed Ames
First-Team Coaches	(England) Neil Critchley
First-Team Coaches	(England) Stuart Lewis
Goalkeeping Coaches	(Republic of Ireland) Rene Gilmartin
Goalkeeping Coaches	(England) David Button
Fitness Coach	(England) Jon Ashton
Director of Football Operations	(England) Dmitri Halajko
Director of Performance	(England) Andy Rolls
Head of Analysis	(Republic of Ireland) Cillian Callaly
Head of Recruitment	(England) Will Stephenson
Head of Athletic Performance	(England) Matt Allen
Head Physiotherapist	(England) Matt Byard
Head of Strength & Conditioning	(England) Dan Peacock
Sports Scientist	(England) Kit Barnes
Sports Therapist	(England) Alice Grindrod
Kit Manager	(England) Lee Owen

== First-team squad ==
As of 29 September 2026

No.	Player	Position(s)	Nationality	Place of birth	Date of birth (age)	Signed from	Date signed	Fee	Contract end
Goalkeepers
1	Alex Palmer	GK	(England)	Kidderminster	10 August 1996 (age 30)	West Bromwich Albion	3 February 2025	£2,000,000	30 June 2028
27	David Button	GK (Note: Player-coach. Not registered for the season)	(England)	Stevenage	27 February 1989 (age 37)	Reading	3 February 2025	Free transfer	30 June 2026
28	Christian Walton	GK	(England)	Wadebridge	9 November 1995 (age 31)	Brighton & Hove Albion	19 January 2022	Undisclosed	30 June 2029
37	Kjell Scherpen	GK	(Netherlands)	Emmen	23 January 2000 (age 26)	Union Saint-Gilloise	28 July 2026	£8,500,000	30 June 2030
Defenders
2	Darnell Furlong	RB/LB	(England)	Luton	31 October 1995 (age 31)	West Bromwich Albion	28 August 2025	£3,500,000	30 June 2028
3	Leif Davis	LB	(England)	Newcastle upon Tyne	31 December 1999 (age 26)	Leeds United	25 July 2022	£1,200,000	30 June 2029
4	Cédric Kipré	CB	(Ivory Coast)	(France) Paris	9 December 1996 (age 29)	Reims	1 July 2026	£2,160,000	30 June 2028
6	Issa Diop	CB	(Morocco)	(France) Toulouse	9 January 1997 (age 29)	Fulham	22 July 2026	£8,500,000	30 June 2030
24	Jacob Greaves	CB	(England)	Cottingham	12 September 2000 (age 26)	Hull City	12 July 2024	Undisclosed	30 June 2029
26	Dara O'Shea	CB	(Republic of Ireland)	Dublin	4 March 1999 (age 27)	Burnley	25 August 2024	Undisclosed	30 June 2030
42	Abdoul Ouattara	LB/RB	(Ivory Coast)	Zoukpangbeu	22 October 2005 (age 21)	Strasbourg	17 August 2026	£17,100,000	30 June 2031
Midfielders
5	Azor Matusiwa	DM	(Netherlands)	Hilversum	28 April 1998 (age 28)	Rennes	13 July 2025	£7,800,000	30 June 2029
12	Florentino Luís	DM	(Portugal)	(Angola) Lobito	19 August 1999 (age 27)	Burnley	4 August 2026	£16,000,000	30 June 2031
14	Jack Taylor	CM	(Republic of Ireland)	(England) Hammersmith	23 June 1998 (age 28)	Peterborough United	26 June 2023	£1,500,000	30 June 2028
23	Saša Lukić	DM	(Serbia)	Šabac	13 August 1996 (age 30)	Fulham	8 August 2026	£9,000,000	30 June 2030
25	Exequiel Palacios	CM	(Argentina)	Famaillá	5 August 1998 (age 28)	Bayer Leverkusen	27 August 2026	£19,200,000	30 June 2030
32	Marcelino Núñez	CM	(Chile)	Recoleta	1 March 2000 (age 26)	Norwich City	29 August 2025	£7,500,000	30 June 2029
Forwards
7	Abdul Fatawu	RW	(Ghana)	Tamale	8 March 2004 (age 22)	Leicester City	21 July 2026	£20,000,000	30 June 2031
8	Sindre Walle Egeli	RW/SS	(Norway)	Larvik	21 June 2006 (age 20)	Nordsjælland	29 August 2025	£17,500,000	30 June 2030
9	Zian Flemming	CF/SS	(Netherlands)	Amsterdam	1 August 1998 (age 28)	Burnley	1 September 2026	£17,000,000	30 June 2030
10	Julio Enciso	SS/LW	(Paraguay)	Caaguazú	23 January 2004 (age 22)	Strasbourg	17 August 2026	£26,100,000	30 June 2031
11	Jaden Philogene	LW/RW	(England)	Hammersmith	8 February 2002 (age 24)	Aston Villa	15 January 2025	Undisclosed	30 June 2029
19	Emersonn	CF	(Brazil)	Atílio Vivacqua	16 July 2004 (age 22)	Toulouse	8 July 2026	£24,000,000	30 June 2031
20	Kasey McAteer	RW	(Republic of Ireland)	(England) Northampton	22 November 2001 (age 25)	Leicester City	22 August 2025	£11,500,000	30 June 2029
29	Chuba Akpom	CF/SS	(England)	Newham	9 October 1995 (age 31)	Ajax	1 July 2026	£7,000,000	30 June 2029
33	Anis Mehmeti	LW/SS	(Albania)	(England) Islington	9 January 2001 (age 25)	Bristol City	23 January 2026	£3,000,000	30 June 2029
38	Daizen Maeda	CF/LW	(Japan)	Taishi	20 October 1997 (age 29)	Celtic	25 July 2026	£8,000,000	30 June 2029
47	Jack Clarke	LW	(England)	York	23 November 2000 (age 25)	Sunderland	24 August 2024	Undisclosed	30 June 2029
Out on loan
18	Ben Johnson	RB/LB	(England)	Waltham Forest	24 January 2000 (age 26)	West Ham United	1 July 2024	Free transfer	30 June 2028
21	Chiedozie Ogbene	RW	(Republic of Ireland)	(Nigeria) Lagos	1 May 1997 (age 29)	Luton Town	28 August 2024	Undisclosed	30 June 2028
30	Cameron Humphreys	CM	(England)	Colchester	30 October 2003 (age 23)	Academy	1 July 2022	—N/a	30 June 2028
31	Kayne van Oevelen	GK	(Netherlands)	Zaandam	7 August 2003 (age 23)	Volendam	21 July 2026	£3,400,000	30 June 2031
	Cieran Slicker	GK	(Scotland)	(England) Oldham	15 September 2002 (age 24)	Manchester City	8 July 2023	Undisclosed	30 June 2028
	Ali Al-Hamadi	CF	(Iraq)	Maysan	1 March 2002 (age 24)	AFC Wimbledon	29 January 2024	£1,000,000	30 June 2028
	Sammie Szmodics	SS/CF	(Republic of Ireland)	(England) Colchester	24 September 1995 (age 31)	Blackburn Rovers	16 August 2024	Undisclosed	30 June 2028

== Transfers and contracts ==
=== In ===
Date	Pos.	Nationality	Player	From	Fee	Ref.
First team
1 July 2026	CB	(Ivory Coast)	Cédric Kipré	(France) Reims	£2,160,000	
1 July 2026	CF	(England)	Chuba Akpom	(Netherlands) Ajax	£7,000,000	
8 July 2026	CF	(Brazil)	Emersonn	(France) Toulouse	£24,000,000	
21 July 2026	GK	(Netherlands)	Kayne van Oevelen	(Netherlands) Volendam	£3,400,000	
21 July 2026	RW	(Ghana)	Abdul Fatawu	(England) Leicester City	£20,000,000	
22 July 2026	CB	(Morocco)	Issa Diop	(England) Fulham	£8,500,000	
25 July 2026	CF	(Japan)	Daizen Maeda	(Scotland) Celtic	£8,000,000	
28 July 2026	GK	(Netherlands)	Kjell Scherpen	(Belgium) Union Saint-Gilloise	£8,500,000	
4 August 2026	CM	(Portugal)	Florentino Luís	(England) Burnley	£16,000,000	
8 August 2026	DM	(Serbia)	Saša Lukić	(England) Fulham	£9,000,000	
17 August 2026	LB	(Ivory Coast)	Abdoul Ouattara	(France) Strasbourg	£17,100,000	
17 August 2026	SS	(Paraguay)	Julio Enciso	(France) Strasbourg	£26,100,000	
27 August 2026	CM	(Argentina)	Exequiel Palacios	(Germany) Bayer Leverkusen	£19,200,000	
1 September 2026	CF	(Netherlands)	Zian Flemming	(England) Burnley	£17,000,000	
Academy
1 July 2026	RW	(England)	Frankie Runham	(England) Chelsea	Undisclosed	
1 July 2026	CF	(England)	Luca Fletcher	(England) Manchester City	Undisclosed	
17 July 2026	RW	(Republic of Ireland)	Christopher Atherton	(England) Chelsea	Undisclosed	
Women's team
26 June 2026	CAM	(England)	Kit Graham	(England) Tottenham Hotspur	Free transfer	
29 June 2026	LW	(Scotland)	Rosie Livingstone	(Scotland) Hibernian	Undisclosed	
1 July 2026	CM	(Republic of Ireland)	Jenna Slattery	(Scotland) Heart of Midlothian	Undisclosed	
1 July 2026	LW	(England)	Megan Hornby	(England) Portsmouth	Free transfer	
8 July 2026	CM	(England)	Aimee Palmer	(England) Southampton	Free transfer	
9 July 2026	CB	(Scotland)	Georgia Hunter	(Scotland) Hearts	Free transfer	
10 July 2026	CF	(Scotland)	Eilidh Adams	(Scotland) Hibernian	Free transfer	
13 July 2026	CF	(England)	Georgia Timms	(Scotland) Heart of Midlothian	Free transfer	
14 July 2026	CB	(Scotland)	Kenzie Weir	(England) Everton	Free transfer	
15 July 2026	RB	(Scotland)	Emma Lawton	(Scotland) Celtic	Free transfer	
16 July 2026	LW	(England)	Tegan McGowan	(England) Birmingham City	Free transfer	
28 August 2026	RB	(England)	Jorja Fox	(England) Chelsea	Undisclosed	
1 September 2026	CAM	(Morocco)	Rosella Ayane	(England) Leicester City	Free transfer	

=== Out ===
Date	Pos.	Nationality	Player	To	Fee	Ref.
First team
1 June 2026	GK	(Kosovo)	Arijanet Muric	(Italy) Sassuolo	£6,000,000	
30 June 2026	RB	(England)	Ashley Young	Retired		
15 July 2026	CB	(Indonesia)	Elkan Baggott	(England) Millwall	Undisclosed	
6 August 2026	RW	(Wales)	Wes Burns	(England) Leicester City	£75,000	
14 August 2026	RB	(England)	Harry Clarke	(England) Preston North End	Undisclosed	
20 August 2026	CF	(Scotland)	George Hirst	(England) Stoke City	£6,000,000	
Academy
Women's team
7 July 2026	RW	(England)	Sophie Peskett	(England) Brighton & Hove Albion	Undisclosed	

=== Loaned in ===
Date	Pos.	Nationality	Player	Loaned from	Date until	Ref.
First team
Academy
2 September 2026	GK	(Republic of Ireland)	Alex Noonan	(Republic of Ireland) Shamrock Rovers	End of season	
Women's team
14 July 2026	RW	(England)	Ava Baker	(England) Birmingham City	3 September 2026	(Note: On 3 September, Bakers loan was terminated due to personal reasons)
3 September 2026	CAM	(Wales)	Mary McAteer	(England) Charlton Athletic	End of season	

=== Loaned out ===
Date	Pos.	Nationality	Player	Loaned to	Date until	Ref.
First team
13 July 2026	GK	(Scotland)	Cieran Slicker	(England) Barnsley	End of season	
1 August 2026	SS	(Republic of Ireland)	Sammie Szmodics	(England) Derby County	End of season	
21 August 2026	RB	(England)	Ben Johnson	(England) Stoke City	End of season	
24 August 2026	GK	(Netherlands)	Kayne van Oevelen	(Spain) Valencia	End of season	
26 August 2026	CF	(Iraq)	Ali Al-Hamadi	(England) Sheffield Wednesday	End of season	
1 September 2026	CM	(England)	Cameron Humphreys	(England) Huddersfield Town	End of season	
1 September 2026	RW	(Republic of Ireland)	Chiedozie Ogbene	(England) Lincoln City	2 January 2027	
Academy
16 July 2026	GK	(New Zealand)	Henry Gray	(New Zealand) Wellington Phoenix	End of season	
28 July 2026	LB	(England)	Somto Boniface	(England) Leyton Orient	End of season	
7 August 2026	CM	(England)	Finley Barbrook	(Scotland) Falkirk	End of season	
7 August 2026	CM	(England)	Steven Turner	(England) Woking	End of season	
29 August 2026	GK	(England)	George Barrett	(England) Braintree Town	2 January 2027	
1 September 2026	RW	(England)	Tudor Mendel-Idowu	(England) Luton Town	2 January 2027	
1 November 2026	CAM	(England)	Jamie Mauge	(England) Billericay Town	1 December 2026	
7 November 2026	GK	(England)	Ruben Wreford	(England) Woodbridge Town	7 December 2026	
Women's team
27 July 2026	GK	(England)	Laura Hartley	(England) Hashtag United	End of season	
2 September 2026	RB	(New Zealand)	Grace Neville	(England) Watford	End of season	

Academy loans only shows players gone to a National League N/S team or higher and for more than a month

=== Released / out of contract ===
Date	Pos.	Nationality	Player	Subsequent club	Join date	Ref.
First team
30 June 2026	LB	(England)	Conor Townsend	(England) West Bromwich Albion	24 July 2026	
30 June 2026	SS	(England)	Conor Chaplin	(England) Leicester City	16 July 2026	
Academy
30 June 2026	GK	(England)	William Fletcher			
30 June 2026	RB	(Republic of Ireland)	Daniel Babb			
30 June 2026	RB	(England)	Steve Brouwers			
30 June 2026	CB	(England)	Fraser Heard			
30 June 2026	LB	(England)	Lenny O'Sullivan			
30 June 2026	CM	(Scotland)	Ryan Carr	(Scotland) St Mirren	1 July 2026	
30 June 2026	CM	(England)	Usisya Longwe	(England) Bishop's Stortford	19 August 2026	
30 June 2026	CM	(Nigeria)	Abube Onuchukwu			
30 June 2026	CM	(England)	Tyler Young	(England) Stamford	26 September 2026	
30 June 2026	RW	(England)	Will Unadike			
30 June 2026	CAM	(Northern Ireland)	Rio Oudnie-Morgan			
30 June 2026	LW	(Republic of Ireland)	Leon Ayinde	(England) Doncaster Rovers	1 July 2026	
30 June 2026	SS	(Republic of Ireland)	Afi Adeabyo	(England) Braintree Town	22 August 2026	
30 June 2026	CF	(England)	Jackson Chuckwu-Nsofor	(England) Bishop's Stortford	19 August 2026	
Women's team
30 June 2026	GK	(Philippines)	Nina Meollo			
30 June 2026	LB	(England)	Summer Hughes	(England) Portsmouth	9 July 2026	
30 June 2026	CM	(England)	Sophie Baigent	(England) Rugby Borough	14 September 2026	
30 June 2026	CM	(England)	Kaci-Jai Bonwick			
30 June 2026	CM	(England)	Ruby Doe	(England) Hashtag United	28 August 2026	
30 June 2026	CM	(England)	Charlotte Fleming	Retired		
30 June 2026	CM	(England)	Shauna Guyatt			
30 June 2026	CM	(England)	Kyra Robertson	(England) Bournemouth	1 July 2026	
30 June 2026	W	(England)	Ruby Seaby	(Scotland) Glasgow City	8 July 2026	
30 June 2026	CF	(England)	Rianna Dean	(England) Fulham	30 July 2026	
30 June 2026	CF	(Jamaica)	Natasha Thomas	(Wales) Wrexham	3 July 2026	

=== New contracts ===
Date signed	Pos.	Nationality	Player	Expiry	Ref.
First team
15 June 2026	RB	(England)	Harry Clarke	30 June 2027	
5 July 2026	RW	(Wales)	Wes Burns	30 June 2027	
1 September 2026	CM	(England)	Cameron Humphreys	30 June 2028	
29 September 2026	GK	(England)	Christian Walton	30 June 2029	
Academy
15 June 2026	GK	(England)	George Barrett	30 June 2027	
15 June 2026	GK	(New Zealand)	Henry Gray	30 June 2027	
15 June 2026	LB	(England)	Josh Lewis	30 June 2027	
15 June 2026	CB	(Guyana)	Walker Shabazz-Edwards	30 June 2027	
15 June 2026	GK	(Scotland)	Woody Williamson	Undisclosed	
15 June 2026	CB	(Lithuania)	Jokūbas Mažionis	Undisclosed	
15 June 2026	RW	(England)	Nico Valentine	Undisclosed	
30 June 2026	LW	(England)	Ashton Boswell	30 June 2027	
7 July 2026	CF	(Northern Ireland)	Sid Eldred	Undisclosed	
13 August 2026	LB	(Northern Ireland)	Darragh McCann	Undisclosed	
19 August 2026	RB	(Barbados)	Leon Elliott	Undisclosed	
26 August 2026	RW	(England)	Tudor Mendel-Idowu	30 June 2028	
Women's team
15 June 2026	CM	(England)	Leah Mitchell	30 June 2028	
18 June 2026	CB	(England)	Maria Boswell	30 June 2027	
30 June 2026	CB	(Scotland)	Megan Wearing	30 June 2028	
24 July 2026	CM	(England)	Lucy O'Brien	30 June 2027	
27 July 2026	GK	(England)	Laura Hartley	30 June 2027	

== Pre-season and friendlies ==
On 16 June, Ipswich announced their first four pre-season friendlies ahead of the 2026–27 campaign. Town will first visit Spain for a training camp from 20 July to 24 July before taking on La Liga side CA Osasuna at the Colchester Community Stadium. Following this, Town will then take on League One sides Oxford United at Kassam Stadium and Wycombe Wanderers at Adams Park before welcoming Ligue 1 side Le Havre AC to Portman Road and then La Liga side Rayo Vallecano four days after. On 24 June, Ipswich announced their final pre-season friendly when they travel to Berlin, Germany to take on Bundesliga side Union Berlin.

Win Draw Loss Fixtures

29 July 2026 Friendly	Ipswich Town	1–2	CA Osasuna	Colchester
19:45 BST	O'Shea (yellow card) 18'; Akpom 53'	Report	Auría 5'; Muñoz (yellow card) 17'; Morales (yellow card) 44'; Bretones (yellow card) 80'; Moro 82'	Stadium: Colchester Community Stadium; Attendance: 4,681; Referee: Bobby Madley

1 August 2026 Friendly	Oxford United	2–0	Ipswich Town	Oxford
12:00 BST	Currie 61'; Mills (yellow card) 42', (goal) 72'	Report		Stadium: Kassam Stadium; Referee: John Busby

1 August 2026 Friendly	Wycombe Wanderers	1–2	Ipswich Town	High Wycombe
16:00 BST	Tezgel 56'	Report	Greaves (yellow card) 44'; Humphreys 75', 89'	Stadium: Adams Park; Attendance: 2,209; Referee: David Rock

4 August 2026 Friendly	Ipswich Town	1–0	Le Havre AC	Ipswich
19:45 BST	Akpom 58'	Report		Stadium: Portman Road; Attendance: 6,669; Referee: Gavin Ward

8 August 2026 Friendly	Ipswich Town	3−0	Rayo Vallecano	Ipswich
15:00 BST	Davis 12', 17'; Emersonn 34'	Report		Stadium: Portman Road; Attendance: 8,749; Referee: Tom Bramall

15 August 2026 Friendly	Union Berlin	2–4	Ipswich Town	Berlin, Germany
15:30 CEST (14:30 BST)	Van Den Bosch 9'; Juranović 53'	Report	Greaves (yellow card) 8'; Clarke 16'; Emersonn 41'; O'Shea 45+1'; McAteer 78'	Stadium: Stadion An der Alten Försterei; Attendance: 12,421

== Competitions ==
=== Overall record ===
Competition	First match	Last match	Starting round	Final position	Record							
Competition	First match	Last match	Starting round	Final position	Pld	W	D	L	GF	GA	GD	Win %
Premier League	22 August 2026	30 May 2027	Matchday 1	TBD	11	3	2	6	15	22	−7	27.27
FA Cup	7–11 January 2027	TBD	Third round	TBD	0	0	0	0	0	0	+0	—
EFL Cup	25 August 2026	15 September 2026	Second round	Third round	2	1	0	1	5	5	+0	50.00
Total					13	4	2	7	20	27	−7	30.77

Last updated: 21 November 2026
Source: Soccerway

=== Premier League ===
==== League table ====
Pos	Team	Pld	W	D	L	GF	GA	GD	Pts	Qualification or relegation
14	Coventry City	11	4	0	7	13	21	−8	12	
15	Fulham	11	2	5	4	11	13	−2	11	
16	Ipswich Town	11	3	2	6	15	22	−7	11	
17	Nottingham Forest	11	2	3	6	9	15	−6	9	
18	Sunderland	11	2	3	6	8	17	−9	9	Relegation to EFL Championship

Updated to match(es) played on 22 November 2026. Source: Premier League
Rules for classification: 1) Points; 2) Goal difference; 3) Goals scored; 4) If the champions, relegated teams or qualified teams for UEFA competitions cannot be determined by rules 1 to 3 following the completion of the competition, rules 4.1 to 4.3 are applied between such teams – 4.1) Head-to-head points; 4.2) Head-to-head away goals; 4.3) Play-off at a neutral site.

==== Results summary ====
Overall								Home						Away					
Pld	W	D	L	GF	GA	GD	Pts	W	D	L	GF	GA	GD	W	D	L	GF	GA	GD
11	3	2	6	15	22	−7	11	2	1	2	6	7	−1	1	1	4	9	15	−6

Last updated: 21 November 2026.
Source: Soccerway

==== Results by round ====
Round	1	2	3	4	5	6	7	8	9	10	11	12	13	14	15	16	17	18	19	20	21	22	23	24	25	26	27	28	29	30	31	32	33	34	35	36	37	38
Ground	H	A	H	A	A	H	A	H	A	H	A	H	A	A	H	A	H	H	A	H	A	H	A	H	H	A	H	A	A	H	A	H	A	H	A	H	A	H
Result	W	L	L	W	L	W	L	D	D	L	L																											
Position	7	12	14	10	11	10	10	12	14	14	16																											
Points	3	3	3	6	6	9	9	10	11	11	11																											

Updated to match(es) played on 21 November 2026. Source: Premier League
A = Away; H = Home; W = Win; D = Draw; L = Loss

==== Matches ====
On 19 June, the Premier League fixtures were released.

Win Draw Loss Fixtures

22 August 2026 1	Ipswich Town	2–1	Sunderland	Ipswich
15:00 BST	Emersonn 24'; Clarke 90'	Report	Ballard (yellow card) 36'; Angulo 39', (yellow card) 55'; O'Nien (yellow card) 63'	Stadium: Portman Road; Attendance: 29,669; Referee: Farai Hallam

30 August 2026 2	Manchester United	5–2	Ipswich Town	Trafford
16:30 BST	Fernandes 40', 61' (pen.), 68'; Greaves 56' (o.g.); Mbeumo 82', (yellow card) 90+3'	Report	Davis 29'; Lukić (yellow card) 33'; Fatawu (yellow card) 37'; Greaves (yellow card) 60'; Akpom 90+1'	Stadium: Old Trafford; Attendance: 74,148; Referee: Craig Pawson
Note: Fixture was initially scheduled for 29 August, but was moved for live Sky Sports broadcast.

4 September 2026 3	Ipswich Town	0–2	Liverpool	Ipswich
20:00 BST	Enciso (yellow card) 41'	Report	Isak 6', 9'; Mac Allister (yellow card) 10'; Jacquet (yellow card) 52'; Kerkez (yellow card) 57'	Stadium: Portman Road; Attendance: 30,019; Referee: Darren England
Note: Fixture was initially scheduled for 5 September, but was moved for live Sky Sports broadcast.

12 September 2026 4	Crystal Palace	2–3	Ipswich Town	Selhurst
15:00 BST	Khalaili 14'; Disasi (red card) 34'; Larsen 75'; Richards (yellow card) 90+4'	Report	Emersonn 23'; Clarke (yellow card) 43'; Davis 45'; Fatawu (yellow card) 58'; Lukić (yellow card) 70'; Flemming 90'	Stadium: Selhurst Park; Attendance: 25,122; Referee: Chris Kavanagh

19 September 2026 5	Everton	1–0	Ipswich Town	Liverpool
15:00 BST	Barry 11'; Mykolenko (yellow card) 42'; Armstrong (yellow card) 90+6'	Report	Fatawu (yellow card) 35' (yellow-red card) 67'; Flemming (yellow card) 90+2'	Stadium: Hill Dickinson Stadium; Attendance: 52,008; Referee: Stuart Attwell

10 October 2026 6	Ipswich Town	2–1	Fulham	Ipswich
15:00 BST	Davis (yellow card) 19'; Ouattara 88'; O'Shea 90+1'; Walton (yellow card) 90+7'	Report	King (yellow card) 44'; Bassey (yellow card) 51'; Sessegnon 55'; Ángel (yellow card) 84'; Smith Rowe (yellow card) 90+4'	Stadium: Portman Road; Attendance: 29,445; Referee: Lewis Smith

17 October 2026 7	Manchester City	3–2	Ipswich Town	Manchester
15:00 BST	Foden 19'; Haaland 34', 69'; Gvardiol (yellow card) 90+7'	Report	Maeda 21'; Ouattara (yellow card) 73'; Flemming 90' (pen.); Davis (yellow card) 90+12'	Stadium: Etihad Stadium; Attendance: 60,817; Referee: Farai Hallam

23 October 2026 8	Ipswich Town	1–1	Nottingham Forest	Ipswich
20:00 BST	Enciso 41'; Diop (yellow card) 51'	Report	Williams 13'; Murillo (yellow card) 54'	Stadium: Portman Road; Attendance: 29,198; Referee: Thomas Bramall
Note: Fixture was initially scheduled for 24 October, but was rescheduled for live Sky Sports broadcasting.

31 October 2026 9	Hull City	2–2	Ipswich Town	Kingston upon Hull
15:00 GMT	Stroud (yellow card) 52'; Iroegbunam 58'; Crooks (yellow card) 60'; McBurnie 68'; Ajayi (yellow card) 88'	Report	Florentino 22'; Palacios (yellow card) 28'; Enciso 74', (yellow card) 81'; Diop (yellow card) 90+2'	Stadium: MKM Stadium; Attendance: 24,459; Referee: Thomas Kirk

8 November 2026 10	Ipswich Town	1–2	Bournemouth	Ipswich
14:00 GMT	Enciso (yellow card) 43'; Clarke 73' (pen.); Flemming (yellow card) 90+9'	Report	Evanilson 5'; Smith (yellow card) 43'; Tavernier (yellow card) 43'; Davis 46' (o.g.); Silva (yellow card) 90+3'	Stadium: Portman Road; Attendance: 29,396; Referee: Simon Hooper
Note: Fixture was initially scheduled for 7 November, but was pushed back a day due to Bournemouth in UEFA Europa League commitments on the preceding Thursday.

21 November 2026 11	Tottenham Hotspur	2–0	Ipswich Town	Tottenham
15:00 GMT	Williams-Barnett 15', (yellow card) 52'; Maddison (yellow card) 41'; Solanke 51'; Kudus (yellow card) 79'; Fernandes (yellow card) 90+5'	Report	Diop (yellow card) 83'	Stadium: Tottenham Hotspur Stadium; Attendance: 61,533; Referee: Rob Jones

28 November 2026 12	Ipswich Town	v	Aston Villa	Ipswich
17:30 GMT				Stadium: Portman Road
Note: Fixture was initially scheduled for a 15:00 kick-off, but was pushed back for live Sky Sports broadcasting.

1 December 2026 13	Coventry City	v	Ipswich Town	Coventry
20:00 GMT				Stadium: Coventry Building Society Arena
Note: Fixture was initially scheduled for 2 December, but was brought forward a night for live Sky Sports broadcasting.

5 December 2026 14	Leeds United	v	Ipswich Town	Leeds
15:00 GMT				Stadium: Elland Road

12 December 2026 15	Ipswich Town	v	Newcastle United	Ipswich
15:00 GMT				Stadium: Portman Road

20 December 2026 16	Brighton & Hove Albion	v	Ipswich Town	Brighton and Hove
14:00 GMT				Stadium: Falmer Stadium
Note: Fixture was initially scheduled for 19 December, but was pushed back a day due to Brighton in UEFA Conference League involvments on the preceding Thursday.

26 December 2026 17	Ipswich Town	v	Brentford	Ipswich
15:00 GMT				Stadium: Portman Road

30 December 2026 18	Ipswich Town	v	Chelsea	Ipswich
20:15 GMT				Stadium: Portman Road
Note: Fixture was initially scheduled for 20:00, but was rescheduled for live Sky Sports broadcasting.

2 January 2027 19	Arsenal	v	Ipswich Town	Holloway
15:00 GMT				Stadium: Emirates Stadium

6 January 2027 20	Ipswich Town	v	Coventry City	Ipswich
19:30 GMT				Stadium: Portman Road
Note: Fixture was initially scheduled for 20:00, but was rescheduled for live Sky Sports broadcasting.

17 January 2027 21	Bournemouth	v	Ipswich Town	Bournemouth
14:00 GMT				Stadium: Dean Court
Note: Fixture was initially scheduled for 16 January, but was pushed back a day as a result of Bournemouth's participation in the Europa League on the preceding Thursday.

23 January 2027 22	Ipswich Town	v	Hull City	Ipswich
15:00 GMT				Stadium: Portman Road

30 January 2027 23	Aston Villa	v	Ipswich Town	Birmingham
15:00 GMT				Stadium: Villa Park

6 February 2027 24	Ipswich Town	v	Tottenham Hotspur	Ipswich
15:00 GMT				Stadium: Portman Road

10 February 2027 25	Ipswich Town	v	Arsenal	Ipswich
20:00 GMT				Stadium: Portman Road

20 February 2027 26	Chelsea	v	Ipswich Town	Fulham
15:00 GMT				Stadium: Stamford Bridge

27 February 2027 27	Ipswich Town	v	Brighton & Hove Albion	Ipswich
15:00 GMT				Stadium: Portman Road

3 March 2027 28	Brentford	v	Ipswich Town	Brentford
20:00 GMT				Stadium: Brentford Community Stadium

13 March 2027 29	Liverpool	v	Ipswich Town	Liverpool
15:00 GMT				Stadium: Anfield

20 March 2027 30	Ipswich Town	v	Crystal Palace	Ipswich
15:00 GMT				Stadium: Portman Road

10 April 2027 31	Sunderland	v	Ipswich Town	Sunderland
15:00 BST				Stadium: Stadium of Light

17 April 2027 32	Ipswich Town	v	Manchester United	Ipswich
15:00 BST				Stadium: Portman Road

24 April 2027 33	Newcastle United	v	Ipswich Town	Newcastle upon Tyne
15:00 BST				Stadium: St James' Park

1 May 2027 34	Ipswich Town	v	Leeds United	Ipswich
15:00 BST				Stadium: Portman Road

8 May 2027 35	Fulham	v	Ipswich Town	Fulham
15:00 BST				Stadium: Craven Cottage

15 May 2027 36	Ipswich Town	v	Manchester City	Ipswich
15:00 BST				Stadium: Portman Road

23 May 2027 37	Nottingham Forest	v	Ipswich Town	West Bridgford
15:00 BST				Stadium: City Ground

30 May 2027 38	Ipswich Town	v	Everton	Ipswich
16:00 BST				Stadium: Portman Road

=== FA Cup ===
As a Premier League club, Ipswich will enter the FA Cup in the third round.

Win Draw Loss Fixtures

=== EFL Cup ===
As a Premier League club, Ipswich entered the EFL Cup in the second round. On 10 August 2026, the second round draw was made, with Ipswich being drawn at home against Leicester City. Following a 3–1 win, on 26 August 2026, Ipswich were drawn at home against Arsenal for the third round.

Win Draw Loss

25 August 2026 Second round	Ipswich Town	3–1	Leicester City	Ipswich
19:45 BST	Humphreys (yellow card) 49'; Clarke (yellow card) 54'; Egeli 62'; Kipré (yellow card) 65'; Núñez 71', 90+1'	Report	Aluko (yellow card) 40', (goal) 67'; Page (yellow card) 70'	Stadium: Portman Road; Attendance: 21,559; Referee: Lewis Smith

15 September 2026 Third round	Ipswich Town	2–4	Arsenal	Ipswich
20:00 BST	McAteer (yellow card) 34'; Mehmeti 62'; Núñez (yellow card) 87'; Akpom 90+1'	Report	Dowman 7', 47'; Madueke 16'; Merino 58'	Stadium: Portman Road; Attendance: 28,966; Referee: Peter Bankes

== Statistics ==
=== Appearances and goals ===
As of match played 21 November 2026

Players with no appearances are not included on the list

No.	Pos	Nat	Player	Total		Premier League		FA Cup		EFL Cup	
No.	Pos	Nat	Player	Apps	Goals	Apps	Goals	Apps	Goals	Apps	Goals
2	DF	(England) ENG	Darnell Furlong	4	0	1+1	0	0	0	2	0
3	DF	(England) ENG	Leif Davis	13	2	11	2	0	0	0+2	0
4	DF	(Ivory Coast) CIV	Cédric Kipré	2	0	0	0	0	0	2	0
5	MF	(Netherlands) NED	Azor Matusiwa	3	0	0+3	0	0	0	0	0
6	DF	(Morocco) MAR	Issa Diop	11	0	11	0	0	0	0	0
7	FW	(Ghana) GHA	Abdul Fatawu	10	0	7+3	0	0	0	0	0
8	FW	(Norway) NOR	Sindre Walle Egeli	4	1	0+2	0	0	0	1+1	1
9	FW	(Netherlands) NED	Zian Flemming	10	2	1+8	2	0	0	1	0
10	FW	(Paraguay) PAR	Julio Enciso	11	2	11	2	0	0	0	0
11	FW	(England) ENG	Jaden Philogene	7	0	4+2	0	0	0	1	0
12	MF	(Portugal) POR	Florentino Luís	10	1	6+3	1	0	0	1	0
19	FW	(Brazil) BRA	Emersonn	11	2	10+1	2	0	0	0	0
20	FW	(Republic of Ireland) IRL	Kasey McAteer	5	0	0+3	0	0	0	2	0
23	MF	(Serbia) SRB	Saša Lukić	8	0	7	0	0	0	0+1	0
24	DF	(England) ENG	Jacob Greaves	7	0	5+1	0	0	0	1	0
25	MF	(Argentina) ARG	Exequiel Palacios	11	0	9+2	0	0	0	0	0
26	DF	(Republic of Ireland) IRL	Dara O'Shea	12	1	11	1	0	0	1	0
28	GK	(England) ENG	Christian Walton	9	0	7	0	0	0	2	0
29	FW	(England) ENG	Chuba Akpom	10	2	0+8	1	0	0	1+1	1
32	MF	(Chile) CHI	Marcelino Núñez	4	2	2	0	0	0	2	2
33	FW	(Albania) ALB	Anis Mehmeti	1	1	0	0	0	0	1	1
37	GK	(Netherlands) NED	Kjell Scherpen	4	0	4	0	0	0	0	0
38	FW	(Japan) JPN	Daizen Maeda	12	1	7+4	1	0	0	0+1	0
40	MF	(England) ENG	Charlie Compton	1	0	0	0	0	0	0+1	0
42	DF	(Ivory Coast) CIV	Abdoul Ouattara	13	1	7+4	1	0	0	2	0
47	FW	(England) ENG	Jack Clarke	12	2	2+8	2	0	0	1+1	0
Player(s) who featured but departed the club permanently during the season:
Player(s) who featured but currently out on loan:
30	MF	(England) ENG	Cameron Humphreys	1	0	0	0	0	0	1	0
43	FW	(England) ENG	Tudor Mendel-Idowu	1	0	0	0	0	0	0+1	0

=== Goalscorers ===
As of match played 21 November 2026

Rank	No.	Pos.	Nat.	Player	Premier League	FA Cup	EFL Cup	Total
1	32	MF	(Chile)	Marcelino Núñez	0	0	2	2
1	19	FW	(Brazil)	Emersonn	2	0	0	2
1	3	DF	(England)	Leif Davis	2	0	0	2
1	29	FW	(England)	Chuba Akpom	1	0	1	2
1	9	FW	(Netherlands)	Zian Flemming	2	0	0	2
1	10	FW	(Paraguay)	Julio Enciso	2	0	0	2
1	47	FW	(England)	Jack Clarke	2	0	0	2
8	8	FW	(Norway)	Sindre Walle Egeli	0	0	1	1
8	33	FW	(Albania)	Anis Mehmeti	0	0	1	1
8	42	DF	(Ivory Coast)	Abdoul Ouattara	1	0	0	1
8	26	DF	(Republic of Ireland)	Dara O'Shea	1	0	0	1
8	38	FW	(Japan)	Daizen Maeda	1	0	0	1
8	12	MF	(Portugal)	Florentino Luís	1	0	0	1
Totals					15	0	5	20

=== Assists ===
As of match played 21 November 2026

Rank	No.	Pos.	Nat.	Player	Premier League	FA Cup	EFL Cup	Total
1	47	FW	(England)	Jack Clarke	1	0	2	3
2	10	FW	(Paraguay)	Julio Enciso	2	0	0	2
2	3	DF	(England)	Leif Davis	1	0	1	2
2	42	DF	(Ivory Coast)	Abdoul Ouattara	2	0	0	2
5	23	MF	(Serbia)	Saša Lukić	1	0	0	1
5	29	FW	(England)	Chuba Akpom	0	0	1	1
5	30	MF	(England)	Cameron Humphreys	0	0	1	1
5	7	FW	(Ghana)	Abdul Fatawu	1	0	0	1
5	19	FW	(Brazil)	Emersonn	1	0	0	1
5	5	MF	(Netherlands)	Azor Matusiwa	1	0	0	1
Totals					10	0	5	15

=== Clean sheets ===
As of match played 21 November 2026

Rank	No.	Nat.	Player	Premier League	FA Cup	EFL Cup	Total
Totals				0	0	0	0

=== Disciplinary record ===
As of match played 21 November 2026

No.	Pos.	Nat.	Player	Premier League		FA Cup		EFL Cup		Total	
No.	Pos.	Nat.	Player	Yellow card	Red card	Yellow card	Red card	Yellow card	Red card	Yellow card	Red card
3	DF	(England)	Leif Davis	2	0	0	0	0	0	2	0
4	DF	(Ivory Coast)	Cédric Kipré	0	0	0	0	1	0	1	0
6	DF	(Morocco)	Issa Diop	3	0	0	0	0	0	3	0
7	FW	(Ghana)	Abdul Fatawu	3	1	0	0	0	0	3	1
9	FW	(Netherlands)	Zian Flemming	2	0	0	0	0	0	2	0
10	FW	(Paraguay)	Julio Enciso	3	0	0	0	0	0	3	0
20	FW	(Republic of Ireland)	Kasey McAteer	0	0	0	0	1	0	1	0
23	MF	(Serbia)	Saša Lukić	2	0	0	0	0	0	2	0
24	DF	(England)	Jacob Greaves	1	0	0	0	0	0	1	0
25	MF	(Argentina)	Exequiel Palacios	1	0	0	0	0	0	1	0
28	GK	(England)	Christian Walton	1	0	0	0	0	0	1	0
30	MF	(England)	Cameron Humphreys	0	0	0	0	1	0	1	0
32	MF	(Chile)	Marcelino Núñez	0	0	0	0	1	0	1	0
42	DF	(Ivory Coast)	Abdoul Ouattara	1	0	0	0	0	0	1	0
47	FW	(England)	Jack Clarke	1	0	0	0	1	0	2	0
Totals				20	1	0	0	5	0	25	1

=== Captains ===
As of match played 21 November 2026

Rank	No.	Nat.	Player	Premier League	FA Cup	EFL Cup	Total	Notes
1	26	(Republic of Ireland)	Dara O'Shea	11	0	1	12	Club captain
2	2	(England)	Darnell Furlong	0	0	1	1	

== Awards ==
=== Player awards ===
==== Premier League Goal of the Month ====
Month	Pos.	Player	Opposition	Result	Ref.
August	FW	(Brazil) Emersonn	v. Sunderland	Nominated	
October	DF	(Ivory Coast) Abdoul Ouattara	v. Fulham	Nominated	

==== Premier League Save of the Month ====
Month	Player	Opposition	Result	Ref.
October	(England) Christian Walton	v. Hull City	Nominated	

==== Premier League Creative Moment of the Month ====
Month	Pos.	Player	Opposition	Result	Ref.
September	FW	(Ghana) Abdul Fatawu	v. Everton	Won	
