= 2024–25 Ipswich Town F.C. season =

147th season in existence of Ipswich Town FC

Ipswich Town
2024–25 season
- Owner: Gamechanger 20 Ltd
- Chairman: Mark Ashton
- Manager: Kieran McKenna
- Stadium: Portman Road
- Premier League: 19th (relegated)
- FA Cup: Fifth round
- EFL Cup: Second round
- Top goalscorer: League: Liam Delap (12); All: Liam Delap (12)
- Highest home attendance: 30,017 (vs Manchester United, Premier League, 24 November 2024)
- Lowest home attendance: 27,678 (vs Bristol Rovers, FA Cup, 12 January 2025)
- Average home league attendance: 29,742
- Biggest win: 4–1 (vs Coventry City (A), FA Cup, 8 February 2025)
- Biggest defeat: 0–6 (vs Manchester City) (H), Premier League, 19 January 2025)
Home colours	Away colours	Third colours

The 2024–25 season was the 147th season in the history of Ipswich Town Football Club, and their first season back in the Premier League since the 2001–02 campaign, following successive promotions from League One and the Championship in the previous two seasons. In addition to the domestic league, the club also competed in the FA Cup and the EFL Cup.

On 26 April 2025, Ipswich Town were relegated back to the Championship after a 3–0 loss to Newcastle United.

== Season summary ==
=== August ===
After back-to-back promotions, the first game of Ipswich Town's return to the Premier League in 22 years saw them face Liverpool, under new manager Arne Slot, at Portman Road. Ipswich handed starts to new signings Jacob Greaves and Liam Delap and started the first half strong, but ended up losing 2–0 after a quick fire double by Liverpool on the hour mark. The opening games were not friendly for Town as a week later they travelled to the Etihad Stadium to face four-time reigning champions Manchester City. The game started well once again when Sammie Szmodics scored on the 7th-minute on his full debut. Arijanet Muric and Ben Johnson were also handed their full debuts, but the game would quickly come undone as Town went onto lose 4–1 handing Kieran McKenna his first back-to-back defeats since joining the club. The month ended with mixed results after losing 4–2 on penalties in round 2 of the EFL Cup to AFC Wimbledon, Town managed to get their first point of the league campaign after drawing 1–1 at home against Fulham with Liam Delap scoring his first goal for the club. This result saw Town climb out of the relegation zone to 17th place.

=== September ===
Town's first game after the international break was on 14 September against Brighton and Hove Albion at the Amex Stadium. Following many chances from both sides, the game finished 0–0. A week later, Ipswich travelled to St Mary's to face fellow newly promoted side Southampton. Both sides were looking for their first win of the season with Southampton looking close to winning until a 95th-minute strike from captain Sam Morsy helped rescue a point with the game ending 1–1. The month ended promisingly for Town when first-time Champions League side Aston Villa travelled to Portman Road. A brace from striker Liam Delap meant the game ended 2–2 and Town ending the month undefeated and on a 4 match undefeated streak, helping them climb to 15th place in the league.

=== October ===
Town's form sadly did not carry on over to October as the month started with a 4–1 loss to West Ham away at the London Stadium. Town looked to turn things around after the international break when they faced Premier League Stalwarts Everton at home. After a couple of wonderful first half goals from Iliman Ndiaye and Michael Keane Town struggled to get back into the game and lost 2–0. Town's final game of the month was away to Brentford at the Gtech Community Stadium. The game looked to start off really well as Town initially went 2–0 up before ending the first half 2–2 after Harry Clarke scored an own goal, gave away a penalty and got sent off. This would have made Clarke the second player in the league's history to achieve this fate but the own goal was later over turned and given to Yoane Wissa. With Town down to 10 men, the match ended in a 4–3 loss and ending the month back in the relegation zone in 18th.

=== November ===
Town looked to turn around the previous months back-to-back losses in November when fellow newly promoted side Leicester City visited Portman Road. Despite being reduced to 10 men, Town looked to win their first game of the season until Leicester equalised late into injury time with the game ending 1–1. Town didn't have to wait much longer though to record their first win of the season when they visited Tottenham Hotspur at Tottenham Hotspur Stadium the following week. After Sammie Szmodics opened the scoring with a bicycle kick, Town went on to win the game 2–1. Towns good form in November carried on two weeks later when Manchester United, under newly appointed manager Ruben Amorim, visited Portman Road. Despite United starting off well, Town managed to come out strong and the game ended 1–1. After going 3 matches unbeaten, the month ended with Town visiting high flying Nottingham Forest. With the only goal coming via a penalty, the game ended in a 1–0 defeat and saw Town end the month in 19th place but only 1 point from safety.

=== December ===
After a promising November, Town looked to carry on their momentum into December starting with two home matches from Crystal Palace and then Bournemouth 5 days later. As close as both games were, Town ended up losing 1–0 to Palace and then 2–1 after Bournemouth scored both their goals in the final minutes of the game. The following week Town travelled to the Molineux Stadium to take on Wolverhampton Wanderers in what was seen as a crucial match at the bottom of the table. After a stunning last minute header from Jack Taylor, Town managed to get their second win of the season and went on to win the game 2–1. After the match a fight broke out in the tunnel and on the pitch involving Rayan Aït-Nouri and Matheus Cunha, the former receiving a red card and the latter getting investigated by The FA, of Wolves and a member of Town's security staff. Following this win, Town's run of fixtures for the end of the year looked to be a tough one. Town started the end of year fixtures with a 4–0 loss at home to Newcastle United and then a close 1–0 defeat to Arsenal at the Emirates Stadium on the day after Boxing Day. Town ended the month and the year on a positive note though when they recorded their third win and their first home win of the season when they defeated Chelsea 2–0 thanks to goals from Liam Delap and Omari Hutchinson. This meant Town ended the year still in the relegation zone but only one point from safety.

=== January ===
Ipswich started 2025 with a 2–2 draw at Craven Cottage against Fulham after two penalties cancelled out goals from Sammie Szmodics and Liam Delap. A week later Town comfortably saw off Bristol Rovers at home in round 3 of the FA Cup winning 3–0. From this point, Ipswich would gain no more points in January with back-to-back home defeats first being 2–0 to Brighton followed by a 6–0 hammering by Manchester City 3 days later. Following this, Town travelled to Anfield to face league leaders Liverpool with January loan signing Julio Enciso marking his debut with an assist for Jacob Greaves, but this only proved to be a consolation goal as the game ended in a 4–1 defeat.

=== February ===
Town looked to bounce back in February when bottom of the league Southampton visited Portman Road. In what was seen as an important match with a chance to pick up points, Southampton went onto shock the Tractor Boys with a 2–1 defeat. The following week Town returned to cup action when they visited the Coventry Building Society Arena to face Coventry City in round 4 of the FA Cup. After a dominant display with new goalkeeper Alex Palmer making an impressive debut, Town went on to win 4–1 and progress to the next round. On 15 February, Town travelled to Villa Park to face Champions League chasing Aston Villa. After going down to ten men in the first half following Axel Tuanzebe's dismissal, Town went 1–0 up through Liam Delap before Villa managed to equalise and the game ended 1–1. The following week, Town were hoping to complete the league double when Tottenham visited Portman Road but the match ended in a 4–1 defeat. February ended with a visit to Old Trafford to face Manchester United. Despite an early goal and then a second from Jaden Philogene, and United being reduced to ten men, the game ended in a 3–2 defeat.

=== March ===
Town started the month once again travelling to City Ground to take on Nottingham Forest in round 5 of the FA Cup. After ending the first 90 minutes at 1–1 the game went into extra time with neither team breaking the deadlock taking the game into a penalty shootout. After Jack Taylor's final penalty was saved, Town were knocked out of the cup losing 5–4 on penalties. On 8 March, Ipswich travelled to Selhurst Park to take on Crystal Palace. Town once again fell to a late goal and the game ended up 1–0 in defeat. One week later, Town once again took on Forest this time in the league at Portman Road. Despite starting well, Town quickly fell behind 3–0 by half time with the game ending 4–2 in defeat. This meant Town were now still in 18th position but now 9 points from safety heading into the international break.

=== April ===
April was seen as a make or break month for Town in their battle for survival. The month started off strong when Town travelled to Dean Court and came away with a 2–1 win against Bournemouth. 3 days later, Town faced a visiting Wolves at Portman Road. With Town currently 9 points behind the visitors and with 8 games still to play, this was viewed as a very crucial match in the relegation fight for both teams and after a first half goal from Liam Delap things were looking in Town's favour as the first half ended 1–0. Unfortunately, Town went on to concede twice late in the second half and the game ended in a 2–1 defeat, meaning Town were now 12 points behind 17th place Wolves with 7 games left to play. The remaining games in April presented a tough challenge for Town when they first travelled to Stamford Bridge to take on Chelsea which ended in a 2–2 draw. After this, Town suffered back-to-back loses first with a 4–0 defeat from a visiting Arsenal before travelling to St James' Park and falling to a 3–0 defeat from Newcastle. This defeat confirmed Ipswich's relegation back to the Championship after one year in the Premier League.

== First-team squad ==
As of 3 February 2025

No.	Player	Position	Nationality	Place of birth	Date of birth (age)	Signed from	Date signed	Fee	Contract end
Goalkeepers
1	Arijanet Muric	GK	(Kosovo)	(Switzerland) Schlieren	7 November 1998 (age 28)	Burnley	17 July 2024	Undisclosed	30 June 2028
13	Cieran Slicker	GK	(Scotland)	(England) Oldham	15 September 2002 (age 24)	Manchester City	8 July 2023	Undisclosed	30 June 2028
28	Christian Walton	GK	(England)	Wadebridge	9 November 1995 (age 31)	Brighton & Hove Albion	19 January 2022	Undisclosed	30 June 2026
31	Alex Palmer	GK	(England)	Kidderminster	10 August 1996 (age 30)	West Bromwich Albion	3 February 2025	£2,000,000	30 June 2028
Defenders
3	Leif Davis	LB	(England)	Newcastle upon Tyne	31 December 1999 (age 26)	Leeds United	25 July 2022	£1,200,000	30 June 2028
6	Luke Woolfenden	CB	(England)	Ipswich	21 October 1998 (age 28)	Academy	1 July 2017	—N/a	30 June 2027
15	Cameron Burgess	CB	(Australia)	(Scotland) Aberdeen	21 October 1995 (age 31)	Accrington Stanley	15 August 2021	£880,000	30 June 2025
18	Ben Johnson	RB	(England)	Waltham Forest	24 January 2000 (age 26)	West Ham United	1 July 2024	Free transfer	30 June 2028
22	Conor Townsend	LB	(England)	Hessle	4 March 1993 (age 33)	West Bromwich Albion	1 August 2024	£500,000	30 June 2026
24	Jacob Greaves	CB	(England)	Cottingham	12 September 2000 (age 26)	Hull City	12 July 2024	Undisclosed	30 June 2029
26	Dara O'Shea	CB	(Republic of Ireland)	Dublin	4 March 1999 (age 27)	Burnley	25 August 2024	Undisclosed	30 June 2029
40	Axel Tuanzebe	CB	(Democratic Republic of the Congo)	Bunia	14 November 1997 (age 29)	Free agent	8 September 2023	—N/a	30 June 2025
44	Ben Godfrey	CB	(England)	York	15 January 1998 (age 28)	Atalanta	5 January 2025	Loan	31 May 2025
Midfielders
5	Sam Morsy	CM	(Egypt)	(England) Wolverhampton	10 September 1991 (age 35)	Middlesbrough	31 August 2021	Undisclosed	30 June 2026
7	Wes Burns	RM	(Wales)	Cardiff	23 November 1994 (age 31)	Fleetwood Town	1 July 2021	Undisclosed	30 June 2026
8	Kalvin Phillips	DM	(England)	Leeds	2 December 1995 (age 30)	Manchester City	16 August 2024	Loan	31 May 2025
12	Jens Cajuste	CM	(Sweden)	Gothenburg	10 August 1999 (age 27)	Napoli	19 August 2024	Loan	31 May 2025
14	Jack Taylor	CM	(Republic of Ireland)	(England) Hammersmith	23 June 1998 (age 28)	Peterborough United	26 June 2023	£1,500,000	30 June 2026
25	Massimo Luongo	CM	(Australia)	Sydney	25 September 1992 (age 34)	Middlesbrough	5 January 2023	Free transfer	30 June 2025
Forwards
9	Julio Enciso	LW	(Paraguay)	Caaguazú	23 January 2004 (age 22)	Brighton & Hove Albion	23 January 2025	Loan	31 May 2025
10	Conor Chaplin	SS	(England)	Worthing	16 February 1997 (age 29)	Barnsley	27 July 2021	£875,000	30 June 2026
19	Liam Delap	CF	(England)	Winchester	8 February 2003 (age 23)	Manchester City	13 July 2024	Undisclosed	30 June 2029
20	Omari Hutchinson	RW	(England)	Redhill	30 October 2003 (age 23)	Chelsea	30 June 2024	£20,000,000	30 June 2029
21	Chiedozie Ogbene	RW	(Republic of Ireland)	(Nigeria) Lagos	1 May 1997 (age 29)	Luton Town	28 August 2024	Undisclosed	30 June 2028
23	Sammie Szmodics	SS	(Republic of Ireland)	(England) Colchester	24 September 1995 (age 31)	Blackburn Rovers	16 August 2024	Undisclosed	30 June 2028
27	George Hirst	CF	(Scotland)	(England) Sheffield	15 February 1999 (age 27)	Leicester City	13 July 2023	Undisclosed	30 June 2027
29	Jaden Philogene	LW	(England)	Hammersmith	8 February 2002 (age 24)	Aston Villa	15 January 2025	Undisclosed	30 June 2029
33	Nathan Broadhead	SS	(Wales)	Bangor	5 April 1998 (age 28)	Everton	9 January 2023	Undisclosed	30 June 2026
47	Jack Clarke	LW	(England)	York	23 November 2000 (age 25)	Sunderland	24 August 2024	Undisclosed	30 June 2029
Out on loan
2	Harry Clarke	RB	(England)	Ipswich	2 March 2001 (age 25)	Arsenal	19 January 2023	Undisclosed	30 June 2026
11	Marcus Harness	LW	(Republic of Ireland)	(England) Coventry	24 February 1996 (age 30)	Portsmouth	15 July 2022	£700,000	30 June 2025
16	Ali Al-Hamadi	CF	(Iraq)	Maysan	1 March 2002 (age 24)	AFC Wimbledon	29 January 2024	£1,000,000	30 June 2028
30	Cameron Humphreys	CM	(England)	Colchester	30 October 2003 (age 23)	Academy	1 July 2022	—N/a	30 June 2026
—N/a	Elkan Baggott	CB	(Indonesia)	(Thailand) Bangkok	23 October 2002 (age 24)	Academy	28 January 2021	—N/a	30 June 2025

== First-team key staff ==
Position	Name
Manager	(Northern Ireland) Kieran McKenna
Assistant Manager	(England) Martyn Pert
First-Team Coaches	(England) Lee Grant
First-Team Coaches	(Nigeria) Sone Aluko
First-Team Coaches	(England) Mark Hudson
Goalkeeping Coach	(Republic of Ireland) Rene Gilmartin
Fitness Coach	(England) Jon Ashton
Director of Performance	(England) Andy Rolls
Head of Strength & Conditioning	(England) Ivan Mukandi
Head Physiotherapist	(England) Matt Byard
Sports Therapist	(England) Alice Gindrod
Head of Athletic Performance	(England) Matt Allen
Sports Scientist	(England) Kit Barnes
Head of Analysis	(England) Charlie Turnbull
Head of Performance Analysis	(England) Jamie Osman
Head of Recruitment	(England) Will Stephenson
Kit Manager	(England) Lee Owen

== Transfers ==
=== First team ===
==== In ====
Date	Pos	Nationality	Player	Transferred from	Fee	Ref
30 June 2024	FW	(England)	Omari Hutchinson	(England) Chelsea	£18,700,000	
1 July 2024	DF	(England)	Ben Johnson	(England) West Ham United	Free transfer	
12 July 2024	DF	(England)	Jacob Greaves	(England) Hull City	Undisclosed (Note: Fee reported as £15,000,000)	
13 July 2024	FW	(England)	Liam Delap	(England) Manchester City	Undisclosed (Note: Fee reported as £15,000,000)	
17 July 2024	GK	(Kosovo)	Arijanet Muric	(England) Burnley	Undisclosed (Note: Fee reported as £8,000,000)	
1 August 2024	DF	(England)	Conor Townsend	(England) West Bromwich Albion	£500,000	
16 August 2024	FW	(Republic of Ireland)	Sammie Szmodics	(England) Blackburn Rovers	Undisclosed (Note: Fee reported as £9,000,000)	
24 August 2024	FW	(England)	Jack Clarke	(England) Sunderland	Undisclosed (Note: Fee reported as £15,000,000)	
25 August 2024	DF	(Republic of Ireland)	Dara O'Shea	(England) Burnley	Undisclosed (Note: Fee reported as £12,000,000)	
28 August 2024	FW	(Republic of Ireland)	Chiedozie Ogbene	(England) Luton Town	Undisclosed (Note: Fee reported as £8,000,000)	
15 January 2025	FW	(England)	Jaden Philogene	(England) Aston Villa	Undisclosed	
3 February 2025	GK	(England)	Alex Palmer	(England) West Bromwich Albion	£2,000,000	

==== Out ====
Date	Pos	Nationality	Player	Transferred to	Fee	Ref
30 June 2024	GK	(England)	Nick Hayes	(England) Barnet	Released	
30 June 2024	GK	(Czech Republic)	Václav Hladký	(England) Burnley	Contract expired	
30 June 2024 (Note: Contract wasn't renewed at the end of the 23/24 season but stayed on during pre-season to continue rehabilitation)	DF	(Saint Lucia)	Janoi Donacien	(England) Chesterfield	Contract expired	
30 June 2024	MF	(England)	Dominic Ball	(England) Leyton Orient	Released	
30 June 2024	MF	(Guinea-Bissau)	Panutche Camará	(England) Crawley Town	Released	
30 June 2024	FW	(England)	Kayden Jackson	(England) Derby County	Released	
30 June 2024	RW	(Nigeria)	Sone Aluko	Retired		
4 July 2024	FW	(Morocco)	Gassan Ahadme	(England) Charlton Athletic	Undisclosed (Note: Fee reported as £1,000,000)	
9 July 2024	MF	(Tunisia)	Idris El Mizouni	(England) Oxford United	£400,000	
30 July 2024	DF	(Republic of Ireland)	Corrie Ndaba	(Scotland) Kilmarnock	Undisclosed	
30 August 2024	FW	(England)	Freddie Ladapo	(England) Huddersfield Town	Mutual consent	
25 January 2025	DF	(England)	George Edmundson	(England) Middlesbrough	£600,000	

==== Loaned in ====
Date	Pos	Nationality	Player	Loaned from	Date until	Ref
16 August 2024	MF	(England)	Kalvin Phillips	(England) Manchester City	31 May 2025	
19 August 2024	MF	(Sweden)	Jens Cajuste	(Italy) Napoli	31 May 2025	
5 January 2025	DF	(England)	Ben Godfrey	(Italy) Atalanta	31 May 2025	
23 January 2025	FW	(Paraguay)	Julio Enciso	(England) Brighton & Hove Albion	31 May 2025	

==== Loaned out ====
Date	Pos	Nationality	Player	Loaned to	Date until	Ref
5 August 2024	DF	(Indonesia)	Elkan Baggott	(England) Blackpool	31 May 2025	
21 August 2024	MF	(England)	Cameron Humphreys	(England) Wycombe Wanderers	31 May 2025	
30 August 2024	LW	(Republic of Ireland)	Marcus Harness	(England) Derby County	31 May 2025	
30 August 2024	DF	(England)	George Edmundson	(England) Middlesbrough	21 January 2025 (Note: On 21 January, Edmundson was recalled from his loan at Middlesbrough)	
24 January 2025	CF	(Iraq)	Ali Al-Hamadi	(England) Stoke City	31 May 2025	
29 January 2025	DF	(England)	Harry Clarke	(England) Sheffield United	31 May 2025	

==== New contracts ====
===== Players =====
Date signed	Number	Pos	Nationality	Player	Contract length	Expiry	Ref
3 June 2024	15	DF	(Australia)	Cameron Burgess	1 year	2025	
3 June 2024	22	MF	(Tunisia)	Idris El Mizouni	1 year	2025	
3 June 2024	40	DF	(Democratic Republic of the Congo)	Axel Tuanzebe	1 year	2025	
31 July 2024	5	MF	(Egypt)	Sam Morsy	2 years	2026	
9 September 2024	7	MF	(Wales)	Wes Burns	2 years	2026	
9 September 2024	1	GK	(England)	Christian Walton	2 years	2026	
30 September 2024	13	GK	(Scotland)	Cieran Slicker	2 years	2028	
21 October 2024	3	DF	(England)	Leif Davis	3 years	2028	
31 January 2025	6	DF	(England)	Luke Woolfenden	2 years	2027	

===== Coaching staff =====
Date signed	Nationality	Name	Contract length	Expiry	Ref
30 May 2024	(Northern Ireland)	Kieran McKenna	4 years	2028	
30 May 2024	(England)	Martyn Pert	Unknown length		
30 May 2024	(England)	Lee Grant	Unknown length		
30 May 2024	(Republic of Ireland)	Rene Gilmartin	Unknown length		
30 May 2024	(England)	Charlie Turnbull	Unknown length		
8 July 2024	(Nigeria)	Sone Aluko	Unknown length		

=== Academy ===
==== In ====
Date	Pos	Nationality	Player	Transferred from	Fee	Ref
15 June 2024	DF	(England)	Leon Elliott	(England) Crystal Palace	Free transfer	
25 June 2024	MF	(England)	Abube Onuchukwu	(England) Aston Villa	Free transfer	
5 July 2024	DF	(Northern Ireland)	Darragh McCann	(Northern Ireland) Glentoran	Undisclosed	
3 September 2024	FW	(England)	Tudor Mendel-Idowu	(Belgium) Anderlecht	Undisclosed	
25 January 2025	FW	(Malta)	Josh Pitts	(England) Southampton	Free transfer	
3 February 2025	DF	(England)	Somto Boniface	(England) Chelsea	Undisclosed	
11 April 2025	DF	(England)	Corbin Mthunzi	(England) Brighton & Hove Albion	Free transfer	
24 April 2025	MF	(England)	Charlie Wood	(England) Needham Market	Undisclosed	

==== Out ====
Date	Pos	Nationality	Player	Transferred to	Fee	Ref
30 May 2024	FW	(Thailand)	Silva Mexes	(England) Manchester United	Compensation	
30 June 2024	DF	(England)	Nick Nkansa-Dwamena	Left for US College Football Scholarship		
30 June 2024	MF	(Cyprus)	Alex Graham-Alexandrou	Left for US College Football Scholarship		
30 June 2024	GK	(England)	Danny Cullum	(England) AFC Sudbury	Released	
30 June 2024	DF	(Northern Ireland)	Cameron Stewart	(Northern Ireland) Coleraine	Released	
30 June 2024	MF	(England)	Ben Haddoch	(England) Lowestoft Town	Released	
30 June 2024	MF	(England)	Jack Manly	(England) Leiston	Released	
30 June 2024	MF	(England)	Seth O'Neill	(England) Ipswich Wanderers	Released	
30 June 2024	FW	(England)	Matt Ward	(England) Woking	Released	
30 January 2025	MF	(England)	Osman Foyo	(England) AFC Wimbledon	Undisclosed	
4 February 2025	FW	(Republic of Ireland)	Jesse Nwabueze	(England) Bath City	Free transfer	

==== Loaned out ====
Date	Pos	Nationality	Player	Loaned to	Date until	Ref
16 August 2024	MF	(England)	Osman Foyo	(England) Chelmsford City	1 January 2025	
19 August 2024	MF	(England)	Fin Barbrook	(England) Sutton United	31 May 2025	
30 August 2024	FW	(Republic of Ireland)	Leon Ayinde	(England) Rochdale	31 May 2025	
3 September 2024	DF	(Republic of Ireland)	Edwin Agbaje	(England) Sutton United	1 January 2025	
6 September 2024	MF	(England)	Ryan Carr	(England) Gateshead	5 January 2025	
9 September 2024	FW	(England)	Nico Valentine	(England) Needham Market	1 January 2025	
20 September 2024	GK	(Scotland)	Woody Williamson	(England) Chelmsford City	1 January 2025	
3 January 2025	GK	(New Zealand)	Henry Gray	(England) Braintree Town	31 May 2025	
3 January 2025	DF	(England)	Harry Barbrook	(England) Chelmsford City	31 May 2025	
13 January 2025	DF	(Lithuania)	Jokubas Mazionis	(England) Woking	31 May 2025	
18 January 2025	FW	(Montserrat)	Ashley Boatswain	(England) AFC Fylde	31 May 2025	
18 January 2025	MF	(England)	Ryan Carr	(England) Ebbsfleet United	31 May 2025	
24 January 2025	MF	(England)	Emmanuel Okunowo	(England) Needham Market	31 May 2025	
29 January 2025	DF	(Republic of Ireland)	Daniel O'Connor	(England) Farnborough	31 May 2025	
31 January 2025	FW	(England)	Nico Valentine	(England) Chelmsford City	31 May 2025	

Only shows players loaned to a National League N/S team or higher and for more than a month

==== New contracts ====
===== Players =====
Date signed	Pos	Nationality	Player	Contract length	Expiry	Ref
25 September 2024	GK	(New Zealand)	Henry Gray	Unknown length		

=== Women ===
==== In ====
Date	Pos	Nationality	Player	Transferred from	Fee	Ref
12 July 2024	MF	(England)	Angela Addison	(England) Charlton Athletic	Free	
12 July 2024	DF	(England)	Grace Garrad	(England) Lewes	Free	
12 July 2024	MF	(England)	Shauna Guyatt	(England) Crystal Palace	Free	
16 July 2024	MF	(England)	Charlotte Fleming	(England) Watford	Free	
17 July 2024	FW	(England)	Ella Rutherford	(England) Charlton Athletic	Free	
18 July 2024	GK	(England)	Natalia Negri	(England) Crystal Palace	Free	

==== Out ====
Date	Pos	Nationality	Player	Transferred to	Fee	Ref
7 February 2025	MF	(England)	Eloise King	(England) Hashtag United	Undisclosed	

==== Loaned in ====
Date	Pos	Nationality	Player	Loaned from	Fee	Ref
15 August 2024	FW	(England)	Isabella Fisher†	(England) Arsenal	31 May 2025	
10 January 2024	FW	(England)	Lucy Watson	(England) Chelsea	31 May 2025	
24 January 2025	MF	(England)	Elkie Bowyer†	(England) Tottenham Hotspur	31 May 2025	
2 February 2025	MF	(England)	Ruby Doe†	(England) West Ham United	31 May 2025	
15 March 2025	FW	(England)	Ruby Seaby†	(England) Arsenal	31 May 2025	

† Dual registration with parent club

==== Loaned out ====
Date	Pos	Nationality	Player	Loaned to	Fee	Ref
19 August 2024	GK	(Philippines)	Nina Meollo	(England) AFC Sudbury	31 May 2025	
31 January 2025	FW	(England)	Issy Bryant	(England) Oxford United	31 May 2025	

==== New contracts ====
===== Coaching staff =====
Date signed	Nationality	Name	Contract length	Expiry	Ref
6 January 2025	(England)	Lauren Phillips	Unknown length		

== Pre-season and friendlies ==
On 16 May, Ipswich Town announced their first pre-season friendly for the 2024–25 campaign, taking on 2. Bundesliga side Fortuna Düsseldorf continuing the strong affiliation between the two sides. The club later confirmed they would travel to Carinthia for a pre-season training camp, and face Shakhtar Donetsk. On 11 July, the club confirmed they would also face two Bundesliga sides in Borussia Mönchengladbach and TSG Hoffenheim during a short training camp in Germany. Five days later, a home friendly match against Nice was announced. On 1 August 2024, it was announced that the game against Borussia Mönchengladbach on 2 August 2024 would now be competed using the under-21s squad as opposed to the first team squad.

Win Draw Loss Fixtures

20 July 2024 Friendly	Shakhtar Donetsk	0–1	Ipswich Town	Villach, Austria
14:00 CEST (13:00 BST)	Marlon (yellow card) 40'	Report	Morsy 28', (yellow card) 40'; Delap (yellow card) 60'; Edmundson (yellow card) 80'	Stadium: Sportzentrum Landskron
Note: This was originally advertised as 2x 60 minute matches but later changed to a single full length match

27 July 2024 Friendly	Ipswich Town	1–2	Fortuna Düsseldorf	Ipswich
15:00 BST	Harness 48'; Burgess (yellow card) 77'	Report	Schmidt 5'; Rossmann 57'	Stadium: Portman Road; Attendance: 15,337; Referee: Josh Smith

3 August 2024 Friendly	TSG Hoffenheim	0–1	Ipswich Town	Kufstein, Austria
13:30 CEST (12:30 BST)		Report	Taylor 43'	Stadium: Kufstein Arena

10 August 2024 Friendly	Ipswich Town	1–0	Nice	Ipswich
12:30 BST	Tuanzebe 58'	Report	Cho (penalty missed) 45'	Stadium: Portman Road; Attendance: ~10,000; Referee: James Bell

== Competitions ==
=== Overall record ===
Competition	First match	Last match	Starting round	Final position	Record							
Competition	First match	Last match	Starting round	Final position	Pld	W	D	L	GF	GA	GD	Win %
Premier League	17 August 2024	25 May 2025	Matchday 1	19th	38	4	10	24	36	82	−46	10.53
FA Cup	12 January 2025	3 March 2025	Third round	Fifth round	3	2	1	0	8	2	+6	66.67
EFL Cup	28 August 2024		Second round	Second round	1	0	1	0	2	2	+0	0.00
Total					42	6	12	24	46	86	−40	14.29

Source: Soccerway

=== Premier League ===
==== League table ====
Pos	Team	Pld	W	D	L	GF	GA	GD	Pts	Qualification or relegation
16	Wolverhampton Wanderers	38	12	6	20	54	69	−15	42	
17	Tottenham Hotspur	38	11	5	22	64	65	−1	38	Qualification for the Champions League league phase (Note: Tottenham Hotspur qualified for the Champions League league phase as the 2024–25 UEFA Europa League winners.)
18	Leicester City (R)	38	6	7	25	33	80	−47	25	Relegation to EFL Championship
19	Ipswich Town (R)	38	4	10	24	36	82	−46	22	Relegation to EFL Championship
20	Southampton (R)	38	2	6	30	26	86	−60	12	Relegation to EFL Championship

Source: Premier League
Rules for classification: 1) Points; 2) Goal difference; 3) Goals scored; 4) If the champions, relegated teams or qualified teams for UEFA competitions cannot be determined by rules 1 to 3, rules 4.1 to 4.3 are applied – 4.1) Points gained in head-to-head record between such teams; 4.2) Away goals scored in head-to-head record between such teams; 4.3) Play-offs
(R) Relegated

==== Results summary ====
Overall								Home						Away					
Pld	W	D	L	GF	GA	GD	Pts	W	D	L	GF	GA	GD	W	D	L	GF	GA	GD
38	4	10	24	36	82	−46	22	1	4	14	14	44	−30	3	6	10	22	38	−16

Source: Soccerway

==== Results by round ====
Round	1	2	3	4	5	6	7	8	9	10	11	12	13	14	15	16	17	18	19	20	21	22	23	24	25	26	27	28	29	30	31	32	33	34	35	36	37	38
Ground	H	A	H	A	A	H	A	H	A	H	A	H	A	H	H	A	H	A	H	A	H	H	A	H	A	H	A	A	H	A	H	A	H	A	A	H	A	H
Result	L	L	D	D	D	D	L	L	L	D	W	D	L	L	L	W	L	L	W	D	L	L	L	L	D	L	L	L	L	W	L	D	L	L	D	L	L	L
Position	18	18	17	17	17	15	17	17	18	18	17	18	19	18	18	18	19	19	18	18	18	18	19	19	18	18	18	18	18	18	18	18	18	18	18	18	19	19
Points	0	0	1	2	3	4	4	4	4	5	8	9	9	9	9	12	12	12	15	16	16	16	16	16	17	17	17	17	17	20	20	21	21	21	22	22	22	22

Source: Premier League
A = Away; H = Home; W = Win; D = Draw; L = Loss; P = Postponed

==== Matches ====
The league fixtures were released on 18 June 2024.

Win Draw Loss Fixtures

17 August 2024 1	Ipswich Town	0–2	Liverpool	Ipswich
12:30 BST	Woolfenden (yellow card) 6'; Hutchinson (yellow card) 13'; Burns (yellow card) 24'	Report	Jota 60'; Salah 65'; Gakpo (yellow card) 90+5'	Stadium: Portman Road; Attendance: 30,014; Referee: Tim Robinson

24 August 2024 2	Manchester City	4–1	Ipswich Town	Manchester
15:00 BST	Haaland 12' (pen.), 16', 88'; De Bruyne 14'; Dias (yellow card) 59'; Grealish (yellow card) 90+5'	Report	Szmodics 7', (yellow card) 55'; Morsy (yellow card) 36'; Al-Hamadi (yellow card) 90+4'	Stadium: City of Manchester Stadium; Attendance: 52,811; Referee: Michael Salisbury

31 August 2024 3	Ipswich Town	1–1	Fulham	Ipswich
15:00 BST	Delap 15'; Morsy (yellow card) 37'; Al-Hamadi (yellow card) 90+4'	Report	Traoré 32', (yellow card) 78'; Lukić (yellow card) 51'; Robinson (yellow card) 58'	Stadium: Portman Road; Attendance: 29,517; Referee: Lewis Smith

14 September 2024 4	Brighton & Hove Albion	0–0	Ipswich Town	Brighton and Hove
15:00 BST	Minteh (yellow card) 47'; Hinshelwood (yellow card) 60'; Veltman (yellow card) 85'; Verbruggen (yellow card) 90+4'	Report	Morsy (yellow card) 7'; Phillips (yellow card) 51'; Hutchinson (yellow card) 57'	Stadium: Falmer Stadium; Attendance: 31,573; Referee: Sam Barrott

21 September 2024 5	Southampton	1–1	Ipswich Town	Southampton
15:00 BST	Dibling 5'; Taylor (yellow card) 25'; Lallana (yellow card) 52'; Downes (yellow card) 63'; Stewart (yellow card) 90+2'	Report	O'Shea (yellow card) 53'; Hutchinson (yellow card) 61'; Delap (yellow card) 63'; Taylor (yellow card) 83'; Morsy 90+5'	Stadium: St Mary's Stadium; Attendance: 31,117; Referee: Sam Allison

29 September 2024 6	Ipswich Town	2–2	Aston Villa	Ipswich
14:00 BST	Delap 8', 72', (yellow card) 45+2'; Morsy (yellow card) 45+2'; Tuanzebe (yellow card) 54'; Greaves (yellow card) 74'	Report	Rogers 15'; Watkins 32'; Digne (yellow card) 46'	Stadium: Portman Road; Attendance: 29,943; Referee: Stuart Attwell
Note: The match was originally scheduled for 28 September 2024, but was moved for live Sky Sports coverage.

5 October 2024 7	West Ham United	4–1	Ipswich Town	Stratford
15:00 BST	Antonio 1'; Kudus 43'; Bowen 49'; Paquetá 69'	Report	Delap 6'; J. Clarke (yellow card) 31'	Stadium: London Stadium; Attendance: 62,467; Referee: Anthony Taylor

19 October 2024 8	Ipswich Town	0–2	Everton	Ipswich
15:15 BST	Taylor (yellow card) 90+3'	Report	Ndiaye 17'; Keane (yellow card) 24', (goal) 40'	Stadium: Portman Road; Attendance: 29,862; Referee: Michael Oliver

26 October 2024 9	Brentford	4–3	Ipswich Town	Brentford
15:00 BST	Wissa 44', 45+1'; Mbeumo 51' (pen.), 90+6'	Report	Szmodics 28'; Hirst 31'; Davis (yellow card) 42'; H. Clarke (yellow card) 49' (yellow-red card) 69'; Delap 86'	Stadium: Gtech Community Stadium; Attendance: 17,109; Referee: Lewis Smith

2 November 2024 10	Ipswich Town	1–1	Leicester City	Ipswich
15:00 GMT	Phillips (yellow card) 44' (yellow-red card) 77'; Davis 55'; Chaplin (yellow card) 81'; Muric (yellow card) 84'; Cajuste (yellow card) 87'; Hirst (yellow card) 89'	Report	Buonanotte (yellow card) 22'; Mavididi (yellow card) 59'; Ayew 90+4'	Stadium: Portman Road; Attendance: 29,874; Referee: Tim Robinson

10 November 2024 11	Tottenham Hotspur	1–2	Ipswich Town	Tottenham
14:00 GMT	Bentancur 69', (yellow card) 78'	Report	Tuanzebe (yellow card) 21'; Szmodics 31'; Delap 43', (yellow card) 46'; Johnson (yellow card) 65'; Davis (yellow card) 90+3'; Hutchinson (yellow card) 90+8'	Stadium: Tottenham Hotspur Stadium; Attendance: 61,505; Referee: Darren England
Note: The match was originally scheduled for 9 November 2024, but was moved due to Tottenham's participation in the UEFA Europa League.

24 November 2024 12	Ipswich Town	1–1	Manchester United	Ipswich
16:30 GMT	Hutchinson 43'	Report	Rashford 2'	Stadium: Portman Road; Attendance: 30,017; Referee: Anthony Taylor
Note: The match was originally scheduled for 23 November 2024, but was moved for live Sky Sports coverage.

30 November 2024 13	Nottingham Forest	1–0	Ipswich Town	West Bridgford
15:00 GMT	Gibbs-White (yellow card) 43'; Wood 49' (pen.)	Report	Tuanzebe (yellow card) 5'; O'Shea (yellow card) 30'; Cajuste (yellow card) 51'	Stadium: City Ground; Attendance: 30,237; Referee: Tony Harrington

3 December 2024 14	Ipswich Town	0–1	Crystal Palace	Ipswich
19:30 GMT	O'Shea (yellow card) 21'; Greaves (yellow card) 78'	Report	Doucouré (yellow card) 23'; Hughes (yellow card) 58'; Mateta 59', (yellow card) 90+3'; Sarr (yellow card) 90'	Stadium: Portman Road; Attendance: 29,533; Referee: Craig Pawson
Note: Live on Prime Video

8 December 2024 15	Ipswich Town	1–2	Bournemouth	Ipswich
14:00 GMT	Delap (yellow card) 12'; Szmodics (yellow card) 16'; Chaplin 21'	Report	Ünal 87'; Brooks (yellow card) 90'; Ouattara 90+5'	Stadium: Portman Road; Attendance: 29,180; Referee: Michael Salisbury
Note: The match was originally scheduled for 7 December 2024, but was moved due to Bournemouth's schedule.

14 December 2024 16	Wolverhampton Wanderers	1–2	Ipswich Town	Wolverhampton
15:00 GMT	Aït-Nouri (yellow card) 45+1' (yellow-red card) 90+5'; Cunha 72'	Report	Doherty 15' (o.g.); H. Clarke (yellow card) 62'; Taylor 90+4', (yellow card) 90+5'; Delap (yellow card) 90+5'	Stadium: Molineux Stadium; Attendance: 30,866; Referee: Simon Hooper

21 December 2024 17	Ipswich Town	0–4	Newcastle United	Ipswich
15:00 GMT	Morsy (yellow card) 65'; Al-Hamadi (yellow card) 76'	Report	Isak 1', 45+2', 54'; Murphy 32'	Stadium: Portman Road; Attendance: 29,774; Referee: Stuart Attwell

27 December 2024 18	Arsenal	1–0	Ipswich Town	Holloway
20:15 GMT	Havertz 23', (yellow card) 54'	Report	Davis (yellow card) 65'	Stadium: Emirates Stadium; Attendance: 60,271; Referee: Darren England
Note: The match was originally scheduled for 26 December 2024, but was moved for live Prime Video coverage.

30 December 2024 19	Ipswich Town	2–0	Chelsea	Ipswich
19:45 GMT	Delap 12' (pen.), (yellow card) 83'; O'Shea (yellow card) 32'; Hutchinson 53'; Davis (yellow card) 88'; Morsy (yellow card) 90+7'	Report	Caicedo (yellow card) 67'; Gusto (yellow card) 88'; Colwill (yellow card) 88'; Fernández (yellow card) 90+5'	Stadium: Portman Road; Attendance: 29,968; Referee: John Brooks
Note: The match was originally scheduled for 29 December 2024, but was moved due to the previous fixture being pushed back a day.

5 January 2025 20	Fulham	2–2	Ipswich Town	Fulham
14:00 GMT	Jiménez 69' (pen.), 90+1' (pen.); Pereira (yellow card) 90+3'	Report	Davis (yellow card) 27'; Szmodics 38'; Broadhead (yellow card) 39'; O'Shea (yellow card) 66'; Morsy (yellow card) 68'; Delap 71' (pen.); Johnson (yellow card) 78'	Stadium: Craven Cottage; Attendance: 27,042; Referee: Darren Bond
Note: The match was originally scheduled for 4 January 2025, but was moved for live Sky Sports coverage.

16 January 2025 21	Ipswich Town	0–2	Brighton & Hove Albion	Ipswich
19:30 GMT	Delap (yellow card) 49'; Woolfenden (yellow card) 62'	Report	João Pedro (yellow card) 54'; Mitoma 59'; Rutter 82'; Veltman (yellow card) 90+1'	Stadium: Portman Road; Attendance: 29,403; Referee: Tony Harrington
Note: The match was originally scheduled for 14 January 2025, but was moved for live TNT Sports coverage.

19 January 2025 22	Ipswich Town	0–6	Manchester City	Ipswich
16:30 GMT		Report	Foden 27', 42'; Kovačić 30'; Doku 49'; Haaland 57'; McAtee 69'; Nunes (yellow card) 79'	Stadium: Portman Road; Attendance: 29,841; Referee: Sam Barrott
Note: The match was originally scheduled for 18 January 2025, but was moved for live Sky Sports coverage.

25 January 2025 23	Liverpool	4–1	Ipswich Town	Liverpool
15:00 GMT	Szoboszlai 11'; Salah 35'; Gakpo 44', 65'	Report	Delap (yellow card) 75'; Enciso (yellow card) 81'; Greaves 90'	Stadium: Anfield; Attendance: 60,420; Referee: Michael Salisbury

1 February 2025 24	Ipswich Town	1–2	Southampton	Ipswich
15:00 GMT	Delap 31'	Report	Aribo 21'; Welington (yellow card) 40'; Bednarek (yellow card) 74'; Onuachu 87'; Sugawara (yellow card) 90+5'	Stadium: Portman Road; Attendance: 29,902; Referee: Michael Oliver

15 February 2025 25	Aston Villa	1–1	Ipswich Town	Birmingham
15:00 GMT	Watkins 69'	Report	Tuanzebe (yellow card) 28' (yellow-red card) 40'; Greaves (yellow card) 53'; Delap 56'; Phillips (yellow card) 68'; Hutchinson (yellow card) 90+5'	Stadium: Villa Park; Attendance: 42,510; Referee: Robert Jones

22 February 2025 26	Ipswich Town	1–4	Tottenham Hotspur	Ipswich
15:00 GMT	Clarke (yellow card) 32'; Hutchinson 36'; Godfrey (yellow card) 40'	Report	Johnson (yellow card) 15', (goal) 18', 26'; Spence 77'; Kulusevski 84'	Stadium: Portman Road; Attendance: 30,003; Referee: Tim Robinson

26 February 2025 27	Manchester United	3–2	Ipswich Town	Trafford
19:30 GMT	Morsy 22' (o.g.); De Ligt 26'; Dorgu (red card) 43'; Højlund (yellow card) 45+4'; Maguire 47'; Zirkzee (yellow card) 61'; Mazraoui (yellow card) 85'; Yoro (yellow card) 90'	Report	Philogene 4', 45+2'; Morsy (yellow card) 35'; O'Shea (yellow card) 45+4'; Delap (yellow card) 85'; Johnson (yellow card) 90+7'	Stadium: Old Trafford; Attendance: 73,827; Referee: Darren England
Note: Fixture was initially scheduled for a 20:00 kick-off, but was moved for live TNT Sports broadcast.

8 March 2025 28	Crystal Palace	1–0	Ipswich Town	Selhurst
15:00 GMT	Richards (yellow card) 53'; Wharton (yellow card) 53'; Guéhi (yellow card) 55'; Sarr 82'; Chilwell (yellow card) 89'	Report	Greaves (yellow card) 16'; Enciso (yellow card) 64'; Phillips (yellow card) 90+3'	Stadium: Selhurst Park; Attendance: 25,155; Referee: Simon Hooper

15 March 2025 29	Ipswich Town	2–4	Nottingham Forest	Ipswich
15:00 GMT	Phillips (yellow card) 54'; Cajuste 82'; Hirst 90+3'	Report	Milenković 35'; Elanga 37', 41'; Domínguez (yellow card) 64'; Silva 87'	Stadium: Portman Road; Attendance: 29,878; Referee: Michael Salisbury

2 April 2025 30	Bournemouth	1–2	Ipswich Town	Bournemouth
19:45 BST	Evanilson 67'; Huijsen (yellow card) 83'	Report	Broadhead 34'; Delap 60'; Townsend (yellow card) 73'; Philogene (yellow card) 90+6'	Stadium: Vitality Stadium; Attendance: 11,192; Referee: Robert Jones
Note: The match was originally scheduled for 1 April 2025, but was moved due to Bournemouth's involvement in the FA Cup.

5 April 2025 31	Ipswich Town	1–2	Wolverhampton Wanderers	Ipswich
15:00 BST	Delap 16'; Palmer (yellow card) 38'; Enciso (yellow card) 90'	Report	André (yellow card) 71'; Sarabia 72'; Larsen 84', (yellow card) 87'	Stadium: Portman Road; Attendance: 29,549; Referee: Peter Bankes

13 April 2025 32	Chelsea	2–2	Ipswich Town	Fulham
14:00 BST	Tuanzebe 46' (o.g.); Palmer (yellow card) 67'; Sancho 79'; Jackson (yellow card) 86'	Report	Enciso 19'; Johnson 31'; Palmer (yellow card) 38'; Morsy (yellow card) 84'	Stadium: Stamford Bridge; Attendance: 39,805; Referee: Stuart Attwell
Note: Fixture was initially scheduled for 12 April, but was moved due to Chelsea playing on the preceding Thursday.

20 April 2025 33	Ipswich Town	0–4	Arsenal	Ipswich
14:00 BST	Davis (red card) 32'	Report	Trossard 14', 69'; Martinelli 28'; Nwaneri 88'	Stadium: Portman Road; Attendance: 29,549; Referee: Chris Kavanagh
Note: Fixture was initially scheduled for 19 April, but was moved for live Sky Sports broadcasting.

26 April 2025 34	Newcastle United	3–0	Ipswich Town	Newcastle upon Tyne
15:00 BST	Burn (yellow card) 44', (goal) 56'; Isak 45+4' (pen.); Osula 80'	Report	Johnson (yellow card) 30' (yellow-red card) 37'; Delap (yellow card) 44'; Greaves (yellow card) 63'	Stadium: St James' Park; Attendance: 52,171; Referee: Michael Salisbury

3 May 2025 35	Everton	2–2	Ipswich Town	Liverpool
15:00 BST	Beto 26'; O'Brien (yellow card) 28'; McNeil 35'; Alcaraz (yellow card) 65'; Mykolenko (yellow card) 79'; Patterson (yellow card) 80'	Report	Delap (yellow card) 28'; Morsy (yellow card) 33'; Enciso 41'; Chaplin (yellow card) 65'; Hirst 79', (yellow card) 81'	Stadium: Goodison Park; Attendance: 39,305; Referee: Lewis Smith

10 May 2025 36	Ipswich Town	0–1	Brentford	Ipswich
15:00 BST	Taylor (yellow card) 17'; Hirst (yellow card) 83'	Report	Nørgaard (yellow card) 17'; Schade 18'; Wissa (yellow card) 70'; Kayode (yellow card) 83'; Yarmolyuk (yellow card) 90+2'	Stadium: Portman Road; Attendance: 29,511; Referee: Sam Barrott

18 May 2025 37	Leicester City	2–0	Ipswich Town	Leicester
15:00 BST	Vardy 28'; McAteer (yellow card) 46', (goal) 69'	Report		Stadium: King Power Stadium; Attendance: 31,986; Referee: Andrew Kitchen

25 May 2025 38	Ipswich Town	1–3	West Ham United	Ipswich
16:00 BST	Broadhead 52'; Delap (yellow card) 81'	Report	Kilman (yellow card) 35'; Ward-Prowse 43'; Bowen 55'; Kudus 87'	Stadium: Portman Road; Attendance: 29,771; Referee: Tim Robinson

=== FA Cup ===
Ipswich Town entered the competition in the third round, and were drawn at home to Bristol Rovers, then away to Coventry City in the fourth round and to Nottingham Forest in the fifth round.

Win Draw Loss Fixtures

12 January 2025 Third round	Ipswich Town	3–0	Bristol Rovers	Ipswich
15:00 GMT	Phillips 18'; J. Clarke 24'; Taylor 37'; Al-Hamadi (penalty missed) 52'	Report	Ward (yellow card) 90+1'	Stadium: Portman Road; Attendance: 27,678; Referee: Oliver Langford

8 February 2025 Fourth round	Coventry City	1–4	Ipswich Town	Coventry
15:00 GMT	Latibeaudiere 8'	Report	Hirst 2' (pen.); J. Clarke 28', 37'; Philogene 63'	Stadium: Coventry Building Society Arena; Attendance: 30,055; Referee: Ben Toner

3 March 2025 Fifth round	Nottingham Forest	1–1 (a.e.t.) (5–4 p)	Ipswich Town	West Bridgford
19:30 GMT	Morato (yellow card) 56'; Yates 68', (yellow card) 96'; Anderson (yellow card) 78'	Report	Luongo (yellow card) 17'; Hirst 53'; Morsy (yellow card) 90'	Stadium: City Ground; Attendance: 29,171; Referee: Tony Harrington
	Penalties
	Wood (penalty scored); Gibbs-White (penalty scored); Anderson (penalty scored); Williams (penalty scored); Hudson-Odoi (penalty scored)		(penalty scored) Morsy; (penalty scored) Delap; (penalty scored) Cajuste; (penalty scored) Johnson; (penalty missed) Taylor
Note: Live on ITV4

=== EFL Cup ===
As a Premier League club not competing in any European competitions, Ipswich entered the EFL Cup in the second round, and were drawn away to EFL League Two side AFC Wimbledon.

Win Draw Loss

28 August 2024 Second round	AFC Wimbledon	2–2 (4–2 p)	Ipswich Town	Wimbledon
19:45 BST	Bugiel 40'; Stevens 56'; Lewis (yellow card) 61'; Johnson (yellow card) 73'	Report	Al-Hamadi 3'; Burgess (yellow card) 81'; Chaplin 86'; Delap (yellow card) 90+4'	Stadium: Plough Lane; Attendance: 7,934; Referee: James Linington
	Penalties
	Pigott (penalty scored); Stevens (penalty scored); Reeves (penalty missed); Biler (penalty scored); Ogundere (penalty scored)		(penalty scored) Delap; (penalty scored) Burgess; (penalty missed) Taylor; (penalty missed) Hutchinson

== Statistics ==
=== Appearances and goals ===
As of match played 25 May 2025

Players with no appearances are not included on the list

No.	Pos	Nat	Player	Total		Premier League		FA Cup		EFL Cup	
No.	Pos	Nat	Player	Apps	Goals	Apps	Goals	Apps	Goals	Apps	Goals
1	GK	(Kosovo) KOS	Arijanet Muric	19	0	18	0	1	0	0	0
3	DF	(England) ENG	Leif Davis	33	1	32+1	1	0	0	0	0
5	MF	(Egypt) EGY	Sam Morsy	34	1	31+2	1	1	0	0	0
6	DF	(England) ENG	Luke Woolfenden	18	0	12+3	0	3	0	0	0
7	MF	(Wales) WAL	Wes Burns	19	0	12+6	0	1	0	0	0
8	MF	(England) ENG	Kalvin Phillips	22	1	14+5	0	2	1	1	0
9	FW	(Paraguay) PAR	Julio Enciso	13	2	12+1	2	0	0	0	0
10	FW	(England) ENG	Conor Chaplin	23	2	10+12	1	0	0	1	1
12	MF	(Sweden) SWE	Jens Cajuste	33	1	25+5	1	0+2	0	1	0
13	GK	(Scotland) SCO	Cieran Slicker	1	0	0	0	0+1	0	0	0
14	MF	(Republic of Ireland) IRL	Jack Taylor	36	2	4+28	1	3	1	0+1	0
15	DF	(Australia) AUS	Cameron Burgess	22	0	16+2	0	3	0	1	0
18	DF	(England) ENG	Ben Johnson	27	1	14+9	1	1+2	0	1	0
19	FW	(England) ENG	Liam Delap	40	12	32+5	12	0+2	0	0+1	0
20	FW	(England) ENG	Omari Hutchinson	32	3	30+1	3	0	0	0+1	0
21	FW	(Republic of Ireland) IRL	Chiedozie Ogbene	6	0	3+2	0	0	0	1	0
22	DF	(England) ENG	Conor Townsend	10	0	3+3	0	3	0	1	0
23	FW	(Republic of Ireland) IRL	Sammie Szmodics	21	4	13+7	4	1	0	0	0
24	DF	(England) ENG	Jacob Greaves	25	1	24	1	0+1	0	0	0
25	MF	(Australia) AUS	Massimo Luongo	15	0	2+9	0	2+1	0	0+1	0
26	DF	(Republic of Ireland) IRL	Dara O'Shea	37	0	35	0	0+1	0	1	0
27	FW	(Scotland) SCO	George Hirst	29	5	6+20	3	2+1	2	0	0
28	GK	(England) ENG	Christian Walton	8	0	7	0	0	0	1	0
29	FW	(England) ENG	Jaden Philogene	11	3	5+5	2	1	1	0	0
31	GK	(England) ENG	Alex Palmer	15	0	13	0	2	0	0	0
33	FW	(Wales) WAL	Nathan Broadhead	21	2	7+11	2	1+2	0	0	0
40	DF	(Democratic Republic of the Congo) COD	Axel Tuanzebe	23	0	20+2	0	1	0	0	0
44	DF	(England) ENG	Ben Godfrey	5	0	2+1	0	2	0	0	0
47	FW	(England) ENG	Jack Clarke	36	3	13+19	0	2+1	3	1	0
Players who featured but departed during the season:
2	DF	(England) ENG	Harry Clarke	8	0	4+3	0	0+1	0	0	0
4	DF	(England) ENG	George Edmundson	1	0	0+1	0	0	0	0	0
11	FW	(Republic of Ireland) IRL	Marcus Harness	3	0	0+2	0	0	0	0+1	0
16	FW	(Iraq) IRQ	Ali Al-Hamadi	13	1	0+11	0	1	0	1	1

=== Goalscorers ===
As of match played 25 May 2025

Rank	No.	Pos.	Nat.	Player	Premier League	FA Cup	EFL Cup	Total
1	19	FW	(England)	Liam Delap	12	0	0	12
2	27	FW	(Scotland)	George Hirst	3	2	0	5
3	23	FW	(Republic of Ireland)	Sammie Szmodics	4	0	0	4
4	47	FW	(England)	Jack Clarke	0	3	0	3
4	20	FW	(England)	Omari Hutchinson	3	0	0	3
4	29	FW	(England)	Jaden Philogene	2	1	0	3
7	10	FW	(England)	Conor Chaplin	1	0	1	2
7	14	MF	(Republic of Ireland)	Jack Taylor	1	1	0	2
7	9	FW	(Paraguay)	Julio Enciso	2	0	0	2
7	33	FW	(Wales)	Nathan Broadhead	2	0	0	2
11	16	FW	(Iraq)	Ali Al-Hamadi	0	0	1	1
11	5	MF	(Egypt)	Sam Morsy	1	0	0	1
11	3	DF	(England)	Leif Davis	1	0	0	1
11	8	MF	(England)	Kalvin Phillips	0	1	0	1
11	24	DF	(England)	Jacob Greaves	1	0	0	1
11	12	MF	(Sweden)	Jens Cajuste	1	0	0	1
11	18	DF	(England)	Ben Johnson	1	0	0	1
Own goals					1	0	0	1
Totals					36	8	2	46

=== Assists ===
As of match played 25 May 2025

Rank	No.	Pos.	Nat.	Player	Premier League	FA Cup	EFL Cup	Total
1	47	FW	(England)	Jack Clarke	4	2	0	6
2	18	DF	(England)	Ben Johnson	2	1	0	3
2	9	FW	(Paraguay)	Julio Enciso	3	0	0	3
2	15	DF	(Australia)	Cameron Burgess	2	0	1	3
5	3	DF	(England)	Leif Davis	2	0	0	2
5	19	FW	(England)	Liam Delap	2	0	0	2
5	27	FW	(Scotland)	George Hirst	1	1	0	2
5	20	FW	(England)	Omari Hutchinson	2	0	0	2
5	22	DF	(England)	Conor Townsend	1	0	1	2
5	26	DF	(Republic of Ireland)	Dara O'Shea	2	0	0	2
11	10	FW	(England)	Conor Chaplin	1	0	0	1
11	5	MF	(Egypt)	Sam Morsy	1	0	0	1
11	7	MF	(Wales)	Wes Burns	1	0	0	1
11	16	FW	(Iraq)	Ali Al-Hamadi	0	1	0	1
11	33	FW	(Wales)	Nathan Broadhead	0	1	0	1
11	40	DF	(Democratic Republic of the Congo)	Axel Tuanzebe	1	0	0	1
11	12	MF	(Sweden)	Jens Cajuste	1	0	0	1
Totals					26	6	2	34

=== Clean sheets ===
As of match played 25 May 2025

Rank	No.	Nat.	Player	Premier League	FA Cup	EFL Cup	Total
1	1	(Kosovo)	Arijanet Muric	1	1	0	2
2	28	(England)	Christian Walton	1	0	0	1
2	13	(Scotland)	Cieran Slicker	0	1 (Note: Came on for Muric in 81st minute against Bristol Rovers, kept clean sheet)	0	1
Totals				2	2	0	4

=== Disciplinary record ===
As of match played 25 May 2025

No.	Pos.	Nat.	Player	Premier League		FA Cup		EFL Cup		Total	
No.	Pos.	Nat.	Player	Yellow card	Red card	Yellow card	Red card	Yellow card	Red card	Yellow card	Red card
1	GK	(Kosovo)	Arijanet Muric	1	0	0	0	0	0	1	0
2	DF	(England)	Harry Clarke	2	1	0	0	0	0	2	1
3	DF	(England)	Leif Davis	5	1	0	0	0	0	5	1
5	MF	(Egypt)	Sam Morsy	9	0	1	0	0	0	10	0
6	DF	(England)	Luke Woolfenden	2	0	0	0	0	0	2	0
7	MF	(Wales)	Wes Burns	1	0	0	0	0	0	1	0
8	MF	(England)	Kalvin Phillips	5	1	0	0	0	0	5	1
9	FW	(Paraguay)	Julio Enciso	3	0	0	0	0	0	3	0
10	FW	(England)	Conor Chaplin	2	0	0	0	0	0	2	0
12	MF	(Sweden)	Jens Cajuste	2	0	0	0	0	0	2	0
14	MF	(Republic of Ireland)	Jack Taylor	4	0	0	0	0	0	4	0
15	DF	(Australia)	Cameron Burgess	0	0	0	0	1	0	1	0
16	FW	(Iraq)	Ali Al-Hamadi	3	0	0	0	0	0	3	0
18	DF	(England)	Ben Johnson	4	1	0	0	0	0	4	1
19	FW	(England)	Liam Delap	12	0	0	0	1	0	13	0
20	MF	(England)	Omari Hutchinson	5	0	0	0	0	0	5	0
22	DF	(England)	Conor Townsend	1	0	0	0	0	0	1	0
23	FW	(Republic of Ireland)	Sammie Szmodics	2	0	0	0	0	0	2	0
24	DF	(England)	Jacob Greaves	5	0	0	0	0	0	5	0
25	MF	(Australia)	Massimo Luongo	0	0	1	0	0	0	1	0
26	DF	(Republic of Ireland)	Dara O'Shea	6	0	0	0	0	0	6	0
27	FW	(Scotland)	George Hirst	3	0	0	0	0	0	3	0
29	FW	(England)	Jaden Philogene	1	0	0	0	0	0	1	0
31	GK	(England)	Alex Palmer	2	0	0	0	0	0	2	0
33	FW	(England)	Nathan Broadhead	1	0	0	0	0	0	1	0
40	DF	(Democratic Republic of the Congo)	Axel Tuanzebe	4	1	0	0	0	0	5	0
44	DF	(England)	Ben Godfrey	1	0	0	0	0	0	1	0
47	FW	(England)	Jack Clarke	2	0	0	0	0	0	2	0
Totals				88	5	2	0	2	0	92	5

=== Captains ===
As of match played 25 May 2025

Rank	No.	Nat.	Player	Premier League	FA Cup	EFL Cup	Total	Notes
1	5	(Egypt)	Sam Morsy	31	1	0	32	Club captain
2	26	(Republic of Ireland)	Dara O'Shea	6	0	0	6	
3	10	(England)	Conor Chaplin	1	0	1	2	
3	6	(England)	Luke Woolfenden	0	2	0	2	
