= Abdoul Ouattara =

Ivorian footballer

- Ouattara with Ipswich Town in 2026

Personal information
- Full name: Abdoul Guemissongui Ouattara
- Date of birth: 22 October 2005 (age 21)
- Place of birth: Zoukpangbeu, Ivory Coast
- Height: 1.80 m (5 ft 11 in)
- Positions: Full-back; midfielder

Team information
- Current team: Ipswich Town
- Number: 42

Youth career
- 2015–2018: FC Niederschaeffolsheim
- 2018–2022: Strasbourg

Senior career*
Years	Team	Apps	(Gls)
2022–2024	Strasbourg II	22	(3)
2024–2026	Strasbourg	45	(3)
2026–	Ipswich Town	8	(1)
- * Club domestic league appearances and goals as of 10 October 2026

Abdoul Guemissongui Ouattara (born 22 October 2005) is an Ivorian professional footballer who plays as a full-back or midfielder for Premier League club Ipswich Town.

== Career ==
Born in the Ivory Coast, Ouattara moved to France at the age of 10 and began playing football with the youth academy of FC Niederschaeffolsheim. In 2018, he moved to the youth academy of Strasbourg, before promoting to their reserves in 2022. On 15 June 2023, he signed his first professional contract with Strasbourg for three seasons. He made his senior and professional debut with Strasbourg as a substitute in a 4–2 loss to Paris Saint-Germain on 19 October 2024.

On 17 August 2026, Outarra signed a five-year contract with Premier League club Ipswich Town. On 10 October 2026, he scored his first goal for them in an eventual 2–1 win against Fulham.

== Playing style ==
Ouattara was originally a striker with his childhood club Niederschaeffolsheim. He later transitioned to winger at Strasbourg, then to an attacking midfield, before settling as a central midfielder.

== Career statistics ==
As of match played 10 October 2026

Appearances and goals by club, season and competition
Club	Season	League			National cup (Note: Includes Coupe de France)		League cup (Note: Includes EFL Cup)		Europe		Total	
Club	Season	Division	Apps	Goals	Apps	Goals	Apps	Goals	Apps	Goals	Apps	Goals
Strasbourg II	2021–22	National 3	6	0	—		—		—		6	0
Strasbourg II	2022–23	National 3	3	0	—		—		—		3	0
Strasbourg II	2023–24	National 3	9	2	—		—		—		9	2
Strasbourg II	2024–25	National 3	4	1	—		—		—		4	1
Strasbourg II	Total		22	3	—		—		—		22	3
Strasbourg	2024–25	Ligue 1	17	1	1	0	—		—		18	1
Strasbourg	2025–26	Ligue 1	28	2	5	0	—		10 (Note: Appearances in UEFA Conference League)	1	44	3
Strasbourg	Total		45	3	6	0	—		10	1	61	4
Ipswich Town	2026–27	Premier League	6	1	0	0	2	0	—		2	0
Career total			76	7	6	0	1	0	10	1	91	8
