= Emersonn =

Brazilian footballer (born 2004)

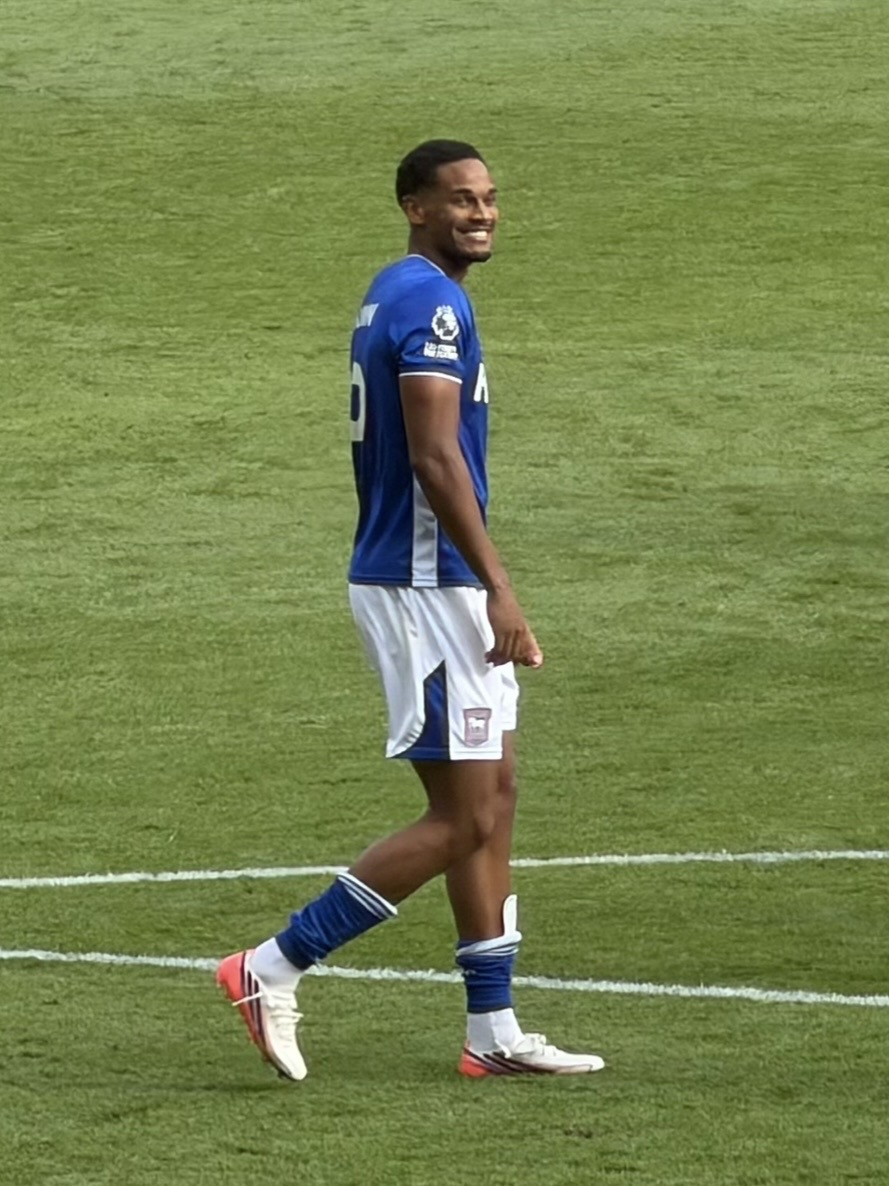
- Emersonn with Ipswich Town in 2026

Personal information
- Full name: Emersonn Correia de Silva
- Date of birth: 16 July 2004 (age 22)
- Place of birth: Atílio Vivácqua, Brazil
- Height: 1.86 m (6 ft 1 in)
- Position: Forward

Team information
- Current team: Ipswich Town
- Number: 19

Youth career
- 2015–2024: Athletico Paranaense

Senior career*
Years	Team	Apps	(Gls)
2024–2025	Athletico Paranaense	13	(0)
2025	Göztepe	21	(2)
2025–2026	Toulouse	28	(6)
2026–	Ipswich Town	5	(2)

International career
2019	Brazil U15	4	(0)
- * Club domestic league appearances and goals as of 03:29, 29 September 2026 (UTC)

Emersonn Correia da Silva (born 16 July 2004), known simply as Emersonn, is a Brazilian professional footballer who plays as a forward for Premier League club Ipswich Town.

== Club career ==
=== Athletico Paranaense ===
Emersonn progressed through the academy of Athletico Paranaense, with his standout season coming in 2021, where he started the campaign with eight goals in only four games. In June of the same year, he signed his first professional contract with the club, a three-year deal. That month, he was called up to the first team to cover for the injured Matheus Babi, but did not feature in any games.

In October 2022, he suffered a tear of his cruciate ligaments, which ruled him out until the second half of the 2023 season.

=== Göztepe ===
In January 2025, Emersonn joined Turkish side Göztepe. Later that year, on 28 April, he netted his first goal in a 4–1 win over İstanbul Başakşehir.

=== Toulouse ===
On 1 September 2025, Emersonn signed with Toulouse in French Ligue 1. A month later, on 5 October, he scored his first goals for the club by netting a brace in a 2–1 away win over Lyon.

=== Ipswich Town ===
On 8 July 2026, Emersonn signed with newly promoted Premier League club Ipswich Town. He was Gary O'Neil's first signing for the club, and he became the first Brazilian to sign for the Suffolk side.

On 22 August 2026, he scored his first goal on his club and Premier League debut in a 2–1 victory over Sunderland at Portman Road.

== International career ==
Emersonn represented Brazil at the 2019 South American U-15 Championship, making four appearances.

== Career statistics ==
=== Club ===
As of match played 12 September 2026

Appearances and goals by club, season and competition
Club	Season	League			State league		National cup (Note: Includes Turkish Cup, Coupe de France)		League cup		Continental		Other		Total	
Club	Season	Division	Apps	Goals	Apps	Goals	Apps	Goals	Apps	Goals	Apps	Goals	Apps	Goals	Apps	Goals
Athletico Paranaense	2024	Série A	13	0	0	0	0	0	—		0	0	0	0	13	0
Göztepe	2024–25	Süper Lig	14	1	—		3	0	—		—		—		17	1
Göztepe	2025–26	Süper Lig	3	1	—		—		—		—		—		3	1
Göztepe	Total		17	2	—		3	0	—		—		—		20	2
Toulouse	2025–26	Ligue 1	28	6	—		4	1	—		—		—		32	7
Ipswich Town	2026–27	Premier League	5	2	—		0	0	0	0	—		—		5	2
Career total			63	10	0	0	7	1	0	0	0	0	0	0	70	11

== Honours ==
Brazil U15

- South American U-15 Championship: 2019
