= Dara O'Shea =

Irish footballer (born 1999)

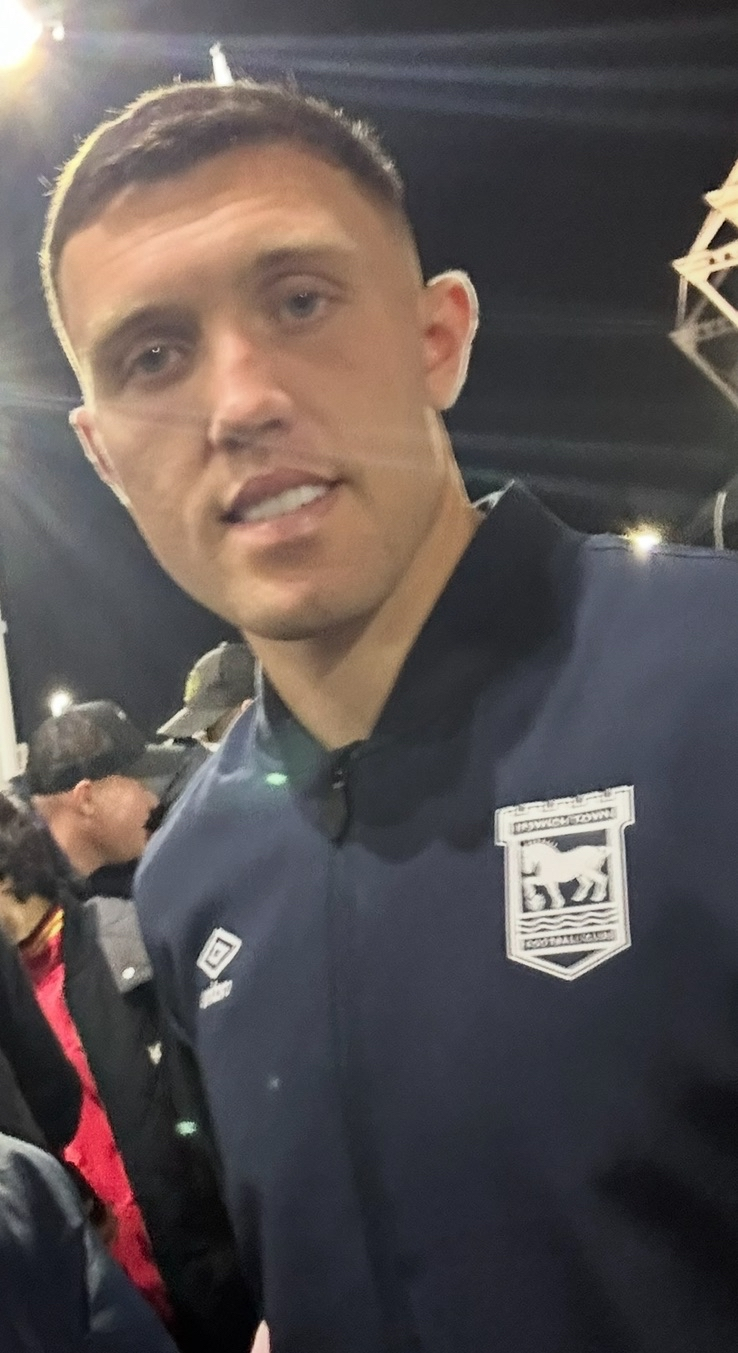
- O'Shea with Ipswich Town in 2025

Personal information
- Full name: Dara Joseph O'Shea
- Date of birth: 4 March 1999 (age 27)
- Place of birth: Dublin, Ireland
- Height: 1.85 m (6 ft 1 in)
- Position: Defender

Team information
- Current team: Ipswich Town
- Number: 26

Youth career
- –2015: St. Kevin's Boys
- 2015–2017: West Bromwich Albion

Senior career*
Years	Team	Apps	(Gls)
2017–2023	West Bromwich Albion	96	(7)
2017–2018	→ Hereford (loan)		
2018–2019	→ Exeter City (loan)	27	(0)
2023–2024	Burnley	35	(4)
2024–	Ipswich Town	92	(2)

International career^{‡}
- Republic of Ireland U19
2019	Republic of Ireland U21	10	(0)
2020–	Republic of Ireland	50	(0)
- * Club domestic league appearances and goals as of 08:38, 22 November 2026 (UTC) ‡ National team caps and goals as of 21:39, 17 November 2026 (UTC)

Dara Joseph O'Shea (born 4 March 1999) is an Irish professional footballer who plays as a defender for Premier League club Ipswich Town, whom he captains, and the Republic of Ireland national team.

== Club career ==
=== West Bromwich Albion ===
Born in Dublin, O'Shea began his career at St. Kevin's Boys before moving to English club West Bromwich Albion. He spent the 2017–18 season on loan at Hereford. O'Shea was part of the Hereford side that won the Southern League Premier Division, winning promotion to the National League North.

He moved on loan to Exeter City in August 2018. He made his debut for the club on 28 August 2018, in a 2–0 defeat to Fulham in the EFL Cup. In March 2019, he was praised by Exeter manager Matt Taylor.

On 21 December 2019, O'Shea made his first team debut for West Brom in a 1–1 home draw against Brentford. O'Shea signed a new three-year contract with West Brom on 24 January 2020. He scored his first league goal on 9 February, in Albion's 2–0 away victory over Millwall.

On 20 August 2022, O'Shea captained the team for the first time in a 5–2 home victory over Hull City, scoring a goal in the game. On 10 February 2023, O'Shea made his 100th appearance for the club in a 2–0 away defeat at Birmingham City.

=== Burnley ===
In June 2023, O'Shea was linked with a transfer to newly promoted Premier League club Burnley. He completed the transfer on 23 June 2023 for a transfer fee of £7 million, signing a four-year contract with the club. He made his debut for the club on 11 August, in a 3–0 defeat to Manchester City. He scored his first goal for The Clarets on 10 February 2024, in a 3–1 loss at Anfield.

=== Ipswich Town ===
On 25 August 2024, O'Shea signed for newly promoted Premier League club Ipswich Town on a five-year contract. He made his debut in a League Cup loss at AFC Wimbledon on 28 August and played his first Premier League for Ipswich on 14 September in a 0–0 draw at Brighton and Hove Albion.

On 24 June 2025, the club announced he had signed a new five-year contract. On 4 August, he was announced as the new club captain ahead of the 2025–26 season, following the departure of Sam Morsy. He scored his first goal for the club on 17 October, in a 2–1 defeat to Middlesbrough.

== International career ==
=== Youth ===
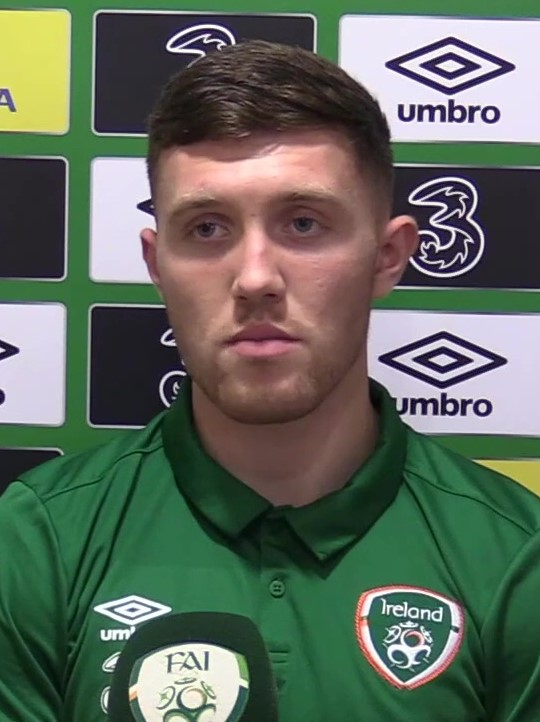
O'Shea with the Republic of Ireland in 2020

O'Shea has represented the Republic of Ireland at under-19 and under-21 youth levels. He was first called up to the under-19's in September 2016 for the friendly double-header against Austria which was Tom Mohan's first game charge, following promotion from the under-17's. He was an unused substitute for the first game but made his debut in the second match, playing the full 90 in a 3–1 win. He then made one appearance for the side in the 2017 UEFA European Under-19 Championship qualifying round, as Ireland qualified for the Elite stage, however, he didn't make any appearances in this round. He played in every game in the 2018 UEFA European Under-19 Championship qualifiers as Ireland just missed out on the final tournament in the Elite round, finishing second to Portugal. He was called up to manager, Stephen Kenny's, first under-21 squad for the friendly against Luxembourg in March 2019 and made his debut in the 3–0 win.

=== Senior ===
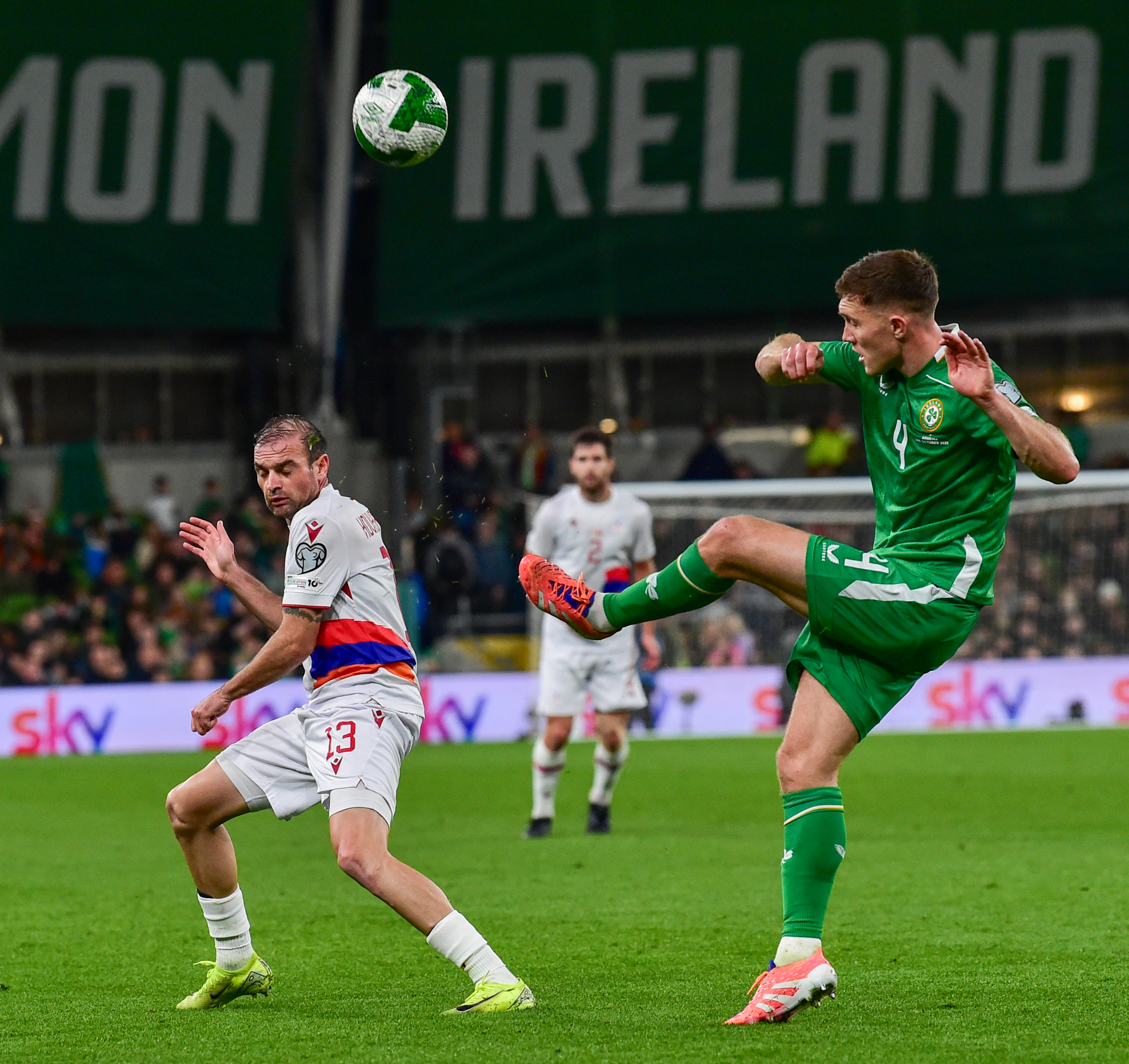
O'Shea playing for the Republic of Ireland in 2025

On 14 October 2020, he made his debut for the senior Republic of Ireland national team in a 1–0 away defeat against Finland in the 2020–21 UEFA Nations League B. On 1 September 2021, he was named FAI Young Player of the Year for 2020. On 1 September 2021, O'Shea suffered an ankle fracture in a 2–1 away defeat at Portugal in the 2022 FIFA World Cup qualification, resulting in a long-term absence until February 2022.

In November 2026 O'Shea praised his national teammates following controversy in October 2026 following matches against Israel which had been subject to boycott calls. On 17 November 2026, he earned his 50th senior international cap in a 3–0 win at home to Kosovo in the UEFA Nations League, captaining the side in the absence of the injured Nathan Collins.

== Career statistics ==
=== Club ===
As of match played 21 November 2026

Appearances and goals by club, season and competition
Club	Season	League			FA Cup		League Cup		Other		Total	
Club	Season	Division	Apps	Goals	Apps	Goals	Apps	Goals	Apps	Goals	Apps	Goals
West Bromwich Albion U21	2016–17	—			—		—		1 (Note: Appearances in EFL Trophy)	0	1	0
West Bromwich Albion	2017–18	Premier League	0	0	0	0	0	0	—		0	0
West Bromwich Albion	2018–19	Championship	0	0	0	0	0	0	0	0	0	0
West Bromwich Albion	2019–20	Championship	17	3	3	0	1	0	—		21	3
West Bromwich Albion	2020–21	Premier League	28	0	1	0	2	0	—		31	0
West Bromwich Albion	2021–22	Championship	14	2	0	0	0	0	—		14	2
West Bromwich Albion	2022–23	Championship	37	2	2	0	2	0	—		41	2
West Bromwich Albion	Total		96	7	6	0	5	0	0	0	107	7
Hereford (loan)	2017–18	SL Premier Division			5	0	—		5 (Note: Appearances in FA Trophy)	1	10	1
Exeter City (loan)	2018–19	League Two	27	0	1	0	1	0	4	0	33	0
Burnley	2023–24	Premier League	33	3	1	0	3	1	—		37	4
Burnley	2024–25	Championship	2	1	—		0	0	—		2	1
Burnley	Total		35	4	1	0	3	1	0	0	39	5
Ipswich Town	2024–25	Premier League	35	0	1	0	1	0	—		37	0
Ipswich Town	2025–26	Championship	46	1	1	0	0	0	—		47	1
Ipswich Town	2026–27	Premier League	11	1	0	0	1	0	—		12	1
Ipswich Town	Total		92	2	2	0	2	0	0	0	96	2
Career total			250	13	15	0	11	1	10	1	286	15

=== International ===
As of match played 17 November 2026

Appearances and goals by national team and year
National team	Year	Apps	Goals
Republic of Ireland	2020	4	0
Republic of Ireland	2021	6	0
Republic of Ireland	2022	6	0
Republic of Ireland	2023	6	0
Republic of Ireland	2024	10	0
Republic of Ireland	2025	9	0
Republic of Ireland	2026	9	0
Total		50	0

== Honours ==
West Bromwich Albion

- EFL Championship runner-up: 2019–20

Ipswich Town

- EFL Championship runner-up: 2025–26

Individual

- FAI Young Player of the Year: 2020
