= Liam Delap =

English footballer (born 2003)

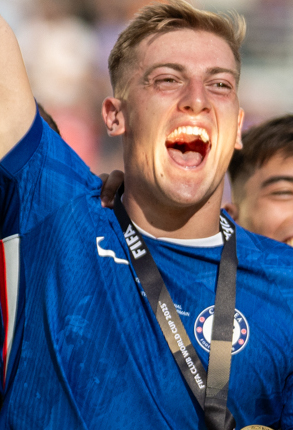
- Delap with Chelsea in 2025

Personal information
- Full name: Liam Rory Delap
- Date of birth: 8 February 2003 (age 23)
- Place of birth: Winchester, England
- Height: 6 ft 2 in (1.87 m)
- Position: Striker

Team information
- Current team: Nottingham Forest
- Number: 19

Youth career
- 2010–2019: Derby County
- 2019–2020: Manchester City

Senior career*
Years	Team	Apps	(Gls)
2020–2024	Manchester City	2	(0)
2022–2023	→ Stoke City (loan)	22	(3)
2023	→ Preston North End (loan)	15	(1)
2023–2024	→ Hull City (loan)	31	(8)
2024–2025	Ipswich Town	37	(12)
2025–2026	Chelsea	28	(1)
2026–	Nottingham Forest	9	(3)

International career^{‡}
2018–2019	England U16	10	(6)
2019	England U17	2	(2)
2021	England U18	1	(1)
2022	England U19	5	(1)
2022–2023	England U20	7	(1)
2023–2025	England U21	12	(3)
Medal record
Men's football
Representing England
UEFA European Under-19 Championship
Winner	2022
- * Club domestic league appearances and goals as of 17:03, 7 November 2026 (UTC) ‡ National team caps and goals as of 22:21, 24 March 2025 (UTC)

Liam Rory Delap (born 8 February 2003) is an English professional footballer who plays as a striker for Premier League club Nottingham Forest.

The son of former Republic of Ireland international Rory Delap, Liam Delap was a part of the Derby County and Manchester City academies. He made his professional debut for Manchester City in 2020 before signing for newly promoted Ipswich Town in 2024. Following Ipswich's relegation that season, during which Delap was their top scorer with 12 goals, he joined Chelsea in 2025 for a reported £30 million. In 2026, Delap transferred to Nottingham Forest.

Liam Delap has played for England from all youth levels from under-16 to under-21. He remains eligible for Republic of Ireland via the grandparent rule.

== Early life ==
Liam Delap was born in Winchester, Hampshire, when his father, Rory Delap, was in a four and a half year spell playing for Southampton, after transferring there from Derby County. His parents met when both worked for Derby County; Rory as a player and his mother, Helen (nee Brentnall), as a physiotherapist. Liam's maternal grandmother, Ann, owned a physiotherapist practice in Derby and was physio for Derbyshire County Cricket Club. She then became the first female physio for the England cricket team. His maternal grandfather worked as a General practitioner based in Derbyshire. Delap was a pupil at The Ecclesbourne School in Duffield, Derbyshire. His brother is Burton Albion player Finn Delap.

His paternal grandfather and three great-uncles are originally from Letterkenny, County Donegal.

== Club career ==
=== Manchester City ===
Delap joined the academy of his local senior club, Derby County, at the age of six. He spent the next 10 years there before leaving in January 2019.

Delap moved to Manchester City's academy, impressing from a young age and being capped at several youth levels with England. He scored a goal and set up two others in the final of the 2020 Under-18 Premier League Cup.

In 20 appearances for the Manchester City's U23 side, Delap scored 24 goals and provided 5 assists, as the club won a record breaking league title. In all competitions, Delap achieved 36 goal contributions in 27 appearances across the season.

==== First team breakthrough ====
On 24 September 2020, Delap made his first-team debut in a 2–1 home win against AFC Bournemouth in the EFL Cup, scoring his first senior goal in the 18th minute. After the match, manager Pep Guardiola praised him and confirmed Delap would continue training with the first team. Three days later, he made his Premier League debut in a 5–2 home defeat by Leicester City, coming on as a substitute for Fernandinho in the 51st minute. In April 2021, Guardiola confirmed that Delap would be moved up to the first team permanently before the following season. Delap won his first trophy on 25 April, when City defeated Tottenham 1–0 in the League Cup final at Wembley Stadium. Delap, however, was not selected for the squad and instead had to follow the match from the stands.

During the 2021 pre-season, Delap suffered an injury to his foot, which led to him missing the Community Shield against Leicester City, which Manchester City lost 1–0, and the 2021–22 Premier League opener against Tottenham Hotspur, which they also lost 1–0. On 20 August, amid interest from several Championship clubs looking to loan him, Delap signed a three-year contract extension with Manchester City. Following a number of injuries, he made his first appearance of the season as a substitute in the FA Cup 3rd Round tie against Fulham in February 2022, and also came on during the 4–0 win over Norwich City in the Premier League, winning the penalty for the fourth goal. On 15 February 2022, Delap made his UEFA Champions League debut in the first leg of the round of 16 tie as a substitute for Bernardo Silva, in a 5–0 away win over Primeira Liga champions Sporting CP.

==== Loan to Stoke City and Preston North End ====
On 18 August 2022, Delap joined Stoke City on loan for the 2022–23 season. He scored his first goal for Stoke in a 3–1 win over Sheffield United on 8 October 2022. After making 23 appearances for Stoke, scoring three goals, Delap was recalled by Manchester City on 12 January 2023 and was sent to Preston North End for the remainder of the 2022–23 season.

==== Loan to Hull City ====
On 2 July 2023, Delap joined Hull City on a season long loan. He made his debut on 5 August 2023 in the 2–1 loss away to Norwich City, scoring the opening goal of the match. Delap was named Hull City's Player of the Month for December 2023.

=== Ipswich Town ===
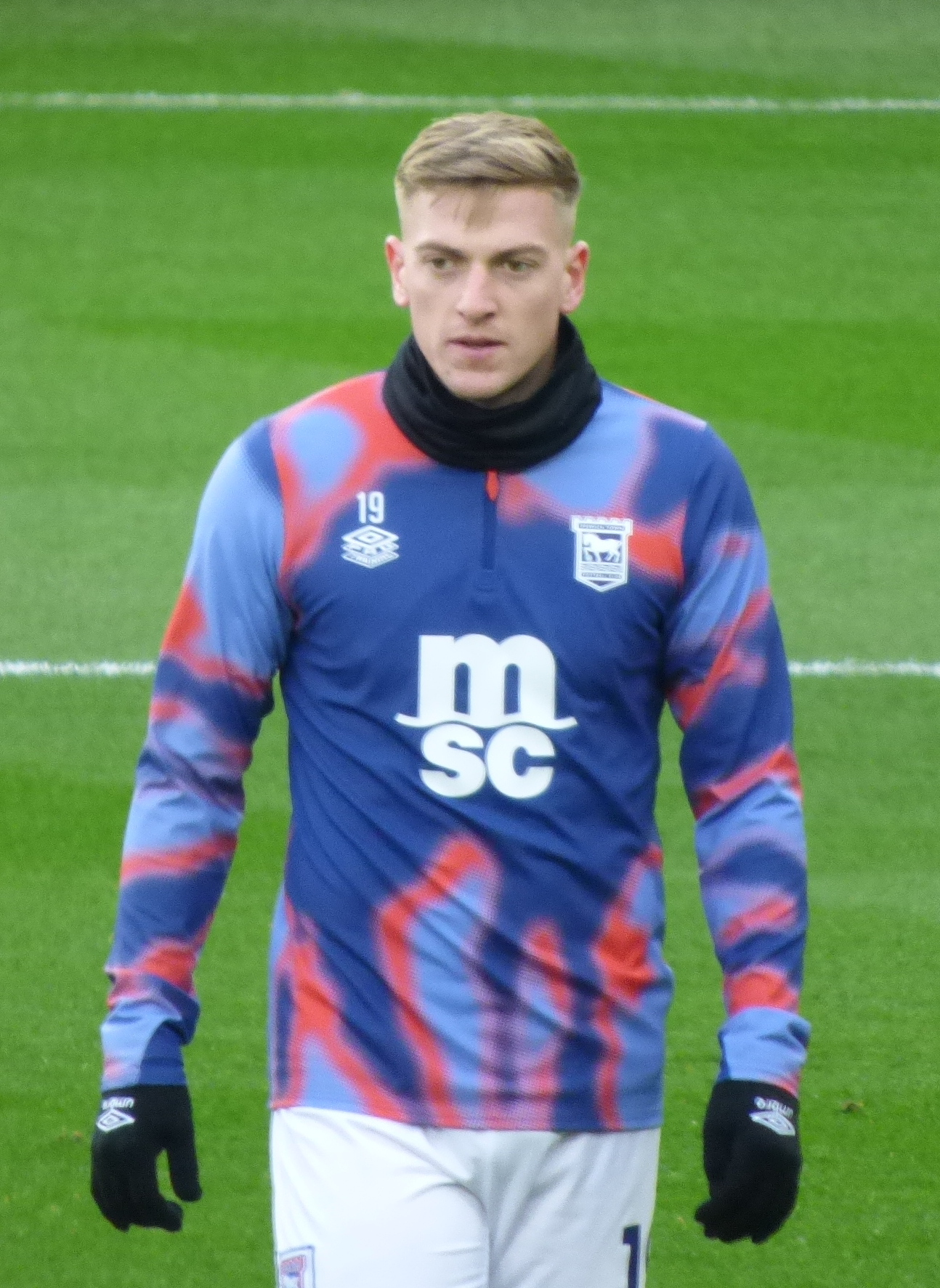
Delap with Ipswich Town in 2024

On 13 July 2024, Delap joined newly promoted Premier League club Ipswich Town on a permanent deal worth up to £20 million on a five-year contract. Delap scored his first goal for the club on 31 August, netting the opener in a 1–1 draw with Fulham. On 29 September, he scored both goals in a 2–2 home draw with Aston Villa, becoming the first Ipswich player to net twice in a Premier League game since Marcus Bent in March 2002. On 30 December, Delap scored and assisted in a 2–0 home league win over Chelsea, helping the club win their first Premier League home game since 2002 as well as their first victory over the Blues since 1993. He ended the season with 12 goals, finishing as the club's top goalscorer.

=== Chelsea ===
On 4 June 2025, fellow Premier League club Chelsea completed the signing of Delap on a six-year deal, triggering a release clause, reported to be £30m. Delap made his debut for Chelsea on 16 June in their opening game of the 2025 FIFA Club World Cup, providing an assist for Enzo Fernández's goal in an eventual 2–0 win over Los Angeles FC. On 19 June, it was announced that Delap was one of six nominees for the PFA Young Player of the Year award.

He scored his first Chelsea goal on 24 June against Espérance Sportive de Tunis in the final group match. Later that year, on 25 November, Delap netted his first UEFA Champions League goal for Chelsea in a 3–0 victory against Barcelona.

On 7 January 2026, Delap scored his first league goal for the club in a 2–1 defeat to Fulham. On 13 February 2026, Delap completed a hat-trick of assists in a 4–0 victory over Hull City in the fifth round of the 2025–26 FA Cup.

On 16 May, Delap appeared as an 83rd-minute substitute for captain Reece James in Chelsea 1–0 loss to Manchester City in the 2026 FA Cup final. He ended his season with Chelsea on a 26-match goal drought, having last scored in the 2–1 loss at Fulham in January.

=== Nottingham Forest ===
On 27 August 2026, Delap joined Nottingham Forest on a five-year contract, for an initial transfer fee worth £45 million, with a further £5 million available in performance-related add-ons. He made his debut as a substitute in a 2–2 draw Premier League draw with Liverpool at Anfield on 29 August 2026. He scored his first goal for the club on 12 September 2026 in a 2–1 league win over Aston Villa at Villa Park.

On 7 November, Delap scored twice in a 3–1 win over former club Manchester City to give Forest their first home win of the 2026–27 season. He scored his first goal with a powerful right-footed shot past Gianluigi Donnarumma after carrying the ball from inside his own half to give Forest a 2–0 lead after 18 minutes. His second goal came on the counter attack in the 73rd minute, receiving the ball from Morgan Gibbs-White and hitting a shot in off the far post with his left foot.

== International career ==
Delap has represented the nation of his birth, England, at all youth levels but remains eligible to represent the Republic of Ireland at senior international level through ancestry.

Delap finished as top scorer at the 2019 Mercedes-Benz Aegean Tournament for England Under-16 in Turkey and later that year went on to score twice for England U17 in a match against Austria. On 29 March 2021, Delap scored on his only appearance for the England U18 side during a 2–0 win away to Wales at Leckwith Stadium.

On 23 March 2022, Delap made his U19 debut as a substitute in a 3–1 win over Republic of Ireland during 2022 UEFA European Under-19 Championship qualification at Bescot Stadium. On 17 June 2022, Delap was included in the England U19 squad for the 2022 UEFA European Under-19 Championship. He scored the only goal of the match in their last group fixture. On 1 July 2022, Delap came off the bench during extra time in the final and helped Aaron Ramsey score the last goal of the game as England beat Israel 3–1 to win the tournament.

On 21 September 2022, Delap made his England U20 debut and scored during a 3–0 victory over Chile at the Pinatar Arena. On 10 May 2023, Delap was included in the England squad for the 2023 FIFA U-20 World Cup. He started in their last group match against Iraq and also came on as a second-half substitute during their round of sixteen elimination against Italy.

On 11 September 2023, Delap made a goalscoring debut for England U21 during a 3–0 2025 UEFA European Under-21 Championship qualification win away to Luxembourg. He also scored in their next qualifier against Serbia. In March 2025 Delap scored his third and last goal at under-21 level during a defeat away to France at Stade du Moustoir. He was included in the England training squad preparing for the 2025 UEFA European Under-21 Championship however ultimately Delap was withdrawn from competing at that tournament due to club commitments.

== Career statistics ==
As of match played 7 November 2026

Appearances and goals by club, season and competition
Club	Season	League			FA Cup		EFL Cup		Europe		Other		Total	
Club	Season	Division	Apps	Goals	Apps	Goals	Apps	Goals	Apps	Goals	Apps	Goals	Apps	Goals
Manchester City U21	2020–21	—			—		—		—		2 (Note: Appearances in EFL Trophy)	3	2	3
Manchester City U21	2021–22	—			—		—		—		2	0	2	0
Manchester City U21	Total		—		—		—		—		4	3	4	3
Manchester City	2020–21	Premier League	1	0	1	0	1	1	0	0	—		3	1
Manchester City	2021–22	Premier League	1	0	1	0	0	0	1 (Note: Appearance(s) in UEFA Champions League)	0	0	0	3	0
Manchester City	Total		2	0	2	0	1	1	1	0	0	0	6	1
Stoke City (loan)	2022–23	Championship	22	3	1	0	—		—		—		23	3
Preston North End (loan)	2022–23	Championship	15	1	—		—		—		—		15	1
Hull City (loan)	2023–24	Championship	31	8	0	0	1	0	—		—		32	8
Ipswich Town	2024–25	Premier League	37	12	2	0	1	0	—		—		40	12
Chelsea	2024–25	Premier League	—		—		—		—		6 (Note: Appearances in FIFA Club World Cup)	1	6	1
Chelsea	2025–26	Premier League	28	1	6	0	2	0	5	1	—		41	2
Chelsea	Total		28	1	6	0	2	0	5	1	6	1	47	3
Nottingham Forest	2026–27	Premier League	9	3	0	0	—		—		—		9	3
Career total			143	28	11	0	5	1	6	1	10	4	175	34

== Honours ==
Chelsea

- FIFA Club World Cup: 2025
- FA Cup runner-up: 2025–26

England U19

- UEFA European Under-19 Championship: 2022

Individual

- Ipswich Town Young Player of the Year: 2024–25
- Ipswich Town Players' Player of the Year: 2024–25
- Ipswich Town Goal of the Season: 2024–25
