= Tudor Mendel =

English footballer (born 2005)

Personal information
- Full name: Tudor Olorunninbe Mendel-Idowu
- Date of birth: 15 January 2005 (age 21)
- Place of birth: Slough, England
- Height: 1.80 m (5 ft 11 in)
- Position: Winger

Team information
- Current team: Luton Town (on loan from Ipswich Town)
- Number: 17

Youth career
- 2013–2023: Chelsea

Senior career*
Years	Team	Apps	(Gls)
2023–2024	RSCA Futures	16	(1)
2024–	Ipswich Town	0	(0)
2026–	→ Luton Town (loan)	9	(0)

International career^{‡}
2019	England U15	2	(1)
2022	England U17	4	(3)
- * Club domestic league appearances and goals as of 22:50, 3 November 2026 (UTC) ‡ National team caps and goals as of 20:34, 30 March 2022 (UTC)

Tudor Olorunninbe Mendel-Idowu (born 15 January 2005) is an English professional footballer who plays as a right winger for EFL League One club Luton Town, on loan from Premier League club Ipswich Town.

== Early life ==
Born in Berkshire, England, Mendel was regarded as a child prodigy academically, featuring numerous times in national and international competitions, most notably coming second in the 2014 edition of Child Genius. Mendel attended independent boys' preparatory boarding school Ludgrove School. At the age of thirteen, he was made a King's Scholar at Eton College.

== Club career ==
=== Early career ===
He joined the youth academy of Chelsea at under-8 level, following interest from numerous other clubs including Arsenal and Tottenham. In July 2021, he signed a new contract with the club.

Following the conclusion of the 2022–23 season, with his contract set to expire, Mendel was offered a new deal by Chelsea. However, on 18 July 2023, it was reported by Spanish journalist Albert Rogé that Mendel had rejected this offer, and was close to joining Spanish side Barcelona.

=== Anderlecht ===
Despite these links, on 27 July 2023, he officially signed for Belgian side Anderlecht. Initially assigned to the club's reserve team, RSCA Futures, Mendel scored on his debut in the Challenger Pro League in a 3–2 win against Dender.

=== Ipswich Town ===
On 3 September 2024, Mendel joined Premier League side Ipswich Town on a permanent deal. He made his debut on 25 August 2026 against Leicester City in the EFL Cup.

On 1 September 2026, Mendel joined League One club Luton Town on a loan deal until January 2027.

== International career ==
Eligible to represent both England and Nigeria at international level, Mendel was first called up to the England under-15 team in 2019. He scored his first England Under-17s goal against Scotland on 8 February in a 3–0 win and followed that up with a further 2 goals in England U17's next game playing as a right winger. He later made substitute appearances against France and Luxembourg in the England U17 qualification games.

== Personal life ==
Mendel's maternal grandfather is John Adeleye-Abai, who played for the Nigeria national football team as a winger. His paternal grandfather, Dr Fola Kayode Mendel-Idowu, was a gifted academic, who specialised in bio-aeronautics and was Africa's first 'flying doctor'.

== Career statistics ==
As of match played 17 November 2026

Appearances and goals by club, season and competition
Club	Season	League			National cup (Note: Includes FA Cup)		League cup (Note: Includes EFL Cup)		Other		Total	
Club	Season	Division	Apps	Goals	Apps	Goals	Apps	Goals	Apps	Goals	Apps	Goals
Chelsea U21	2022–23	—			—		—		1 (Note: Appearance(s) in EFL Trophy)	0	1	0
RSCA Futures	2023–24	Challenger Pro League	16	1	—		—		—		16	1
Ipswich Town	2026–27	Premier League	0	0	0	0	1	0	—		1	0
Luton Town (loan)	2026–27	League One	9	0	1	0	—		2	0	12	0
Career total			25	1	1	0	1	0	3	0	30	1
