= Matt Ward (footballer) =

English footballer (born 2003)

Personal information
- Full name: Matthew James Ward
- Date of birth: 16 August 2003 (age 23)
- Position: Forward

Team information
- Current team: Woking
- Number: 11

Youth career
- Wroxham

Senior career*
Years	Team	Apps	(Gls)
2020–2021	Wroxham	5	(3)
2021–2024	Ipswich Town	0	(0)
2023	→ Derry City (loan)	3	(1)
2023–2024	→ Braintree Town (loan)	13	(3)
2024–	Woking	77	(11)
- * Club domestic league appearances and goals as of 19:36, 11 October 2026 (UTC)

Matthew James Ward (born 16 August 2003) is an English professional footballer who plays as a forward for National League club Woking.

== Career ==
Ward joined the Academy at Ipswich Town from Wroxham in 2020. He had scored three goals in five games for Wroxham in the Eastern Counties Football League during the abandoned 2020–21 season. In March 2021, a deal was agreed "in principle" for him to sign his first professional contract with Ipswich Town the following season. He made his first-team debut on 27 November 2022, coming on as an 82nd-minute substitute for Gassan Ahadme in a 4–0 win over Buxton in the FA Cup.

Following a loan spell with Irish side, Derry City in early 2023, Ward joined National League South side, Braintree Town in November that same year. On 9 February 2024, Ward was recalled from his loan a month earlier than originally expected.

On 17 August 2024, Ward signed for National League club Woking following his departure from Ipswich Town. On the same day, he made his debut for the club during a 2–0 home defeat to Gateshead, replacing Charley Kendall in the 61st minute. A week later, he scored his first goal for Woking in their 3–0 away victory at Ebbsfleet United, curling an effort past Mark Cousins in the 93rd minute. Ward went onto impress during the duration of the season, picking up player of the month awards in September and November. He went onto feature 42 times, scoring 6 goals in his debut season with the club before signing a new two-year deal in May 2025.

== Career statistics ==
As of match played 17 October 2026

Appearances and goals by club, season and competition
Club	Season	League			National Cup		League Cup		Other		Total	
Club	Season	Division	Apps	Goals	Apps	Goals	Apps	Goals	Apps	Goals	Apps	Goals
Wroxham	2020–21	Eastern Counties League Premier Division	5	3	0	0	—		0	0	5	3
Ipswich Town	2021–22	League One	0	0	0	0	0	0	0	0	0	0
Ipswich Town	2022–23	League One	0	0	1	0	0	0	0	0	1	0
Ipswich Town	2023–24	Championship	0	0	0	0	0	0	—		0	0
Ipswich Town	Total		0	0	1	0	0	0	0	0	1	0
Derry City (loan)	2023	LOI Premier Division	3	1	0	0	—		1 (Note: Appearance in the President of Ireland's Cup)	0	4	1
Braintree Town (loan)	2023–24	National League South	13	3	—		—		1 (Note: Appearance in the FA Trophy)	0	14	3
Woking	2024–25	National League	34	4	2	0	—		6 (Note: Three appearances and one goal in the National League Cup, three appearances and one goal in the FA Trophy)	2	42	6
Woking	2025–26	National League	30	3	2	0	—		8 (Note: Four appearances in National League Cup, four appearances in FA Trophy)	0	40	3
Woking	2026–27	National League	13	4	1	0	—		1 (Note: Appearance(s) in National League Cup)	0	15	4
Woking	Total		77	11	5	0	—		15	2	97	13
Career total			97	17	6	0	0	0	17	2	120	19
