= Leon Elliott =

Barbadian footballer (born 2006)

Personal information
- Full name: Leon Levi Elliott
- Date of birth: 22 October 2006 (age 20)
- Place of birth: Croydon, England
- Height: 1.81 m (5 ft 11 in)
- Position: Right-back

Team information
- Current team: Ipswich Town
- Number: 72

Youth career
- 2015–2024: Crystal Palace
- 2024–: Ipswich Town

International career^{‡}
| Years | Team | Apps | (Gls) |
| 2026– | Barbados | 2 | (0) |
- ‡ National team caps and goals as of 15:13, 28 January 2026 (UTC)

Leon Levi Elliott (born 22 October 2006) is a professional footballer who plays as a right-back for EFL Championship club Ipswich Town. Born in England, he plays for the Barbados national team.

== Club career ==
Elliott began playing football at Goals in Beckenham at age 3, before moving to Crystal Palace's youth academy as a under-9 and signing as scholarship agreement with the club. He transferred to Ipswich Town on 20 June 2026, signing his first professional contract.

== International career ==
Born in England, Elliott is of Barbadian descent. He was called up to the Barbados national team for a set of 2025–26 CONCACAF Series matches. He debuted with Barbados in a friendly 3–1 loss to Saint Martin on 26 March 2026.
