= 2025–26 Cheltenham Town F.C. season =

139th season in existence of Cheltenham Town FC

Cheltenham Town
2025–26 season
- Chairman: David Bloxham
- Manager: Michael Flynn (until 20 September); Steve Cotterill (from 30 September)
- Stadium: Whaddon Road
- League Two: 18th
- FA Cup: Third round
- EFL Cup: Second round
- EFL Trophy: Group stage
- Top goalscorer: League: Isaac Hutchinson (15 goals); All: Isaac Hutchinson (18 goals)

The 2025–26 season is the 139th season in the history of Cheltenham Town Football Club and their second consecutive season in League Two. In addition to the domestic league, the club also will participate in the FA Cup, the EFL Cup, and the EFL Trophy.

== Managerial changes ==
On 20 September, the club parted company with Michael Flynn after 68 games in charge with a win ratio of 36.8%. Ten days later, Steve Cotterill returned after 23 years to become the new manager on a three-year contract.

== Transfers and contracts ==
=== In ===
| Date | Pos. | Player | From | Fee | Ref. |
|---|---|---|---|---|---|
| 1 July 2025 (Note: The transfer was announced on 30 June, and would become official on July 1 once his Morecambe contract expired) | CF | (England) Lee Angol | (England) Morecambe | Free | |
| 1 July 2025 (Note: The transfer was announced on 30 June, and would become official on July 1 once his Notts County contract expired) | CB | (England) Robbie Cundy | (England) Notts County | Free | |
| 25 July 2025 | RM | (Wales) Ryan Broom | (England) Fleetwood Town | Free | |
| 28 July 2025 | CB | (Wales) James Wilson | (England) Bristol Rovers | Free | |
| 8 August 2025 | LB | (England) George Harmon | (Scotland) Ross County | Free | |
| 15 August 2025 | LW | (England) Josh Martin | (Wales) Newport County | Free | |
| 4 October 2025 | CM | (England) Ben Stevenson | (England) Cambridge United | Free | |
| 10 October 2025 | CB | (United States) Jonathan Tomkinson | (England) Norwich City | Free | |
| 10 November 2025 | RW | (England) Hakeeb Adelakun | (England) Salford City | Free | |
| 8 January 2026 | CF | (Wales) Jake Bickerstaff | (Wales) Wrexham | Undisclosed | |
| 8 January 2026 | LB | (England) George Nurse | (England) Shrewsbury Town | Free | |

=== Out ===
| Date | Pos. | Player | To | Fee | Ref. |
|---|---|---|---|---|---|
| 18 July 2025 | CF | (England) Matty Taylor | (England) Salisbury | Free Transfer | |
| 29 July 2025 | LW | (England) Liam Dulson | (England) Maidenhead United | Undisclosed | |
| 1 September 2025 | LM | (England) Ethon Archer | (England) Luton Town | Undisclosed | |
| 29 January 2026 | RB | (Republic of Ireland) Darragh Power | (Republic of Ireland) Bohemians | Free Transfer | |

=== Loaned in ===
| Date | Pos. | Player | From | Date until | Ref. |
|---|---|---|---|---|---|
| 7 July 2025 | LB | (England) Taine Anderson | (England) Bristol City | 7 January 2026 (Note: On 7 January, Anderson's season-long loan from Bristol City was terminated) | |
| 29 July 2025 | CB | (Lithuania) Jokūbas Mažionis | (England) Ipswich Town | 2 January 2026 (Note: On 2 January, Mažionis was recalled to his parent club Ipswich) | |
| 29 July 2025 | CF | (Wales) Jake Bickerstaff | (Wales) Wrexham | 8 January 2026 (Note: On 8 January, Bickerstaff's loan from Wrexham was made permanent) | |
| 1 September 2025 | LM | (England) Ethon Archer | (England) Luton Town | 3 January 2026 | |
| 1 September 2025 | CM | (England) Isaac Hutchinson | (England) Bristol Rovers | 6 January 2026 (Note: On 6 January, Hutchinson was recalled from his season-long loan from Bristol Rovers) | |
| 1 September 2025 | CB | (England) Sam Sherring | (England) Milton Keynes Dons | 31 May 2026 | |
| 1 September 2025 | CF | (England) Tom Taylor | (England) Ipswich Town | 13 January 2026 (Note: On 13 January, Taylor's initial season-long loan from Ipswich Town was terminated) | |
| 21 January 2026 | CM | (England) Cole Deeming | (England) West Bromwich Albion | 31 May 2026 | |
| 27 January 2026 | CF | (England) Josh Davison | (England) Tranmere Rovers | 31 May 2026 | |
| 2 February 2026 | CAM | (Wales) Harry Ashfield | (Wales) Wrexham | 31 May 2026 | |
| 2 February 2026 | CF | (The Gambia) Mo Faal | (Wales) Wrexham | 31 May 2026 | |
| 2 February 2026 | CM | (England) Isaac Hutchinson | (England) Bristol Rovers | 31 May 2026 | |

=== Loaned out ===
| Date | Pos. | Player | To | Date until | Ref. |
|---|---|---|---|---|---|
| 17 July 2025 | CF | (England) Sopuruchukwu Obieri | (England) Gloucester City | 9 January 2026 | |
| 21 July 2025 | CB | (England) Cameron Walters | (England) Evesham United | | |
| 19 September 2025 | CM | (England) Harry Tustin | (England) Salisbury | 19 November 2025 (Note: On 22 October, Tustin's loan at Salisbury was extended by a further month) | |
| 10 October 2025 | CB | (England) Ibrahim Bakare | (England) Gateshead | 9 January 2026 | |
| 31 October 2025 | CF | (England) Tom King | (England) Worthing | 3 January 2026 | |
| 9 February 2026 | CDM | (England) Scot Bennett | (England) Weston-super-Mare | 31 May 2026 | |
| 12 February 2026 | CB | (England) Mark Barber | (England) Taunton Town | Work Experience | |
| 17 February 2026 | CM | (England) Harry Tustin | (England) Hereford | 17 March 2026 | |
| 17 February 2026 | LB | (England) Freddy Willcox | (England) Hereford | 17 March 2026 | |
| 24 February 2026 | CM | (England) Tommy Backwell | (England) Weston-super-Mare | 31 May 2026 | |

=== Released / Out of Contract ===
| Date | Pos. | Player | Subsequent club | Join date | Ref. |
|---|---|---|---|---|---|
| 30 June 2025 | CB | (England) Tom Bradbury | (England) Harrogate Town | 1 July 2025 | |
| 30 June 2025 | GK | (Wales) Owen Evans | (England) Barnet | 1 July 2025 | |
| 30 June 2025 | GK | (England) Max Harris | (England) Weston-super-Mare | 1 July 2025 | |
| 30 June 2025 | CM | (England) Brandon Liggett | (England) Evesham United | 1 July 2025 | |
| 30 June 2025 | CM | (England) Tom Pett | (England) Oldham Athletic | 1 July 2025 | |
| 30 June 2025 | CF | (England) Ryan Bowman | | | |
| 9 December 2025 | CM | (England) Harry Pell | (England) Bath City | 18 December 2025 | |
| 12 December 2025 | CF | (England) Lee Angol | | | |
| 6 January 2026 | RW | (England) Hakeeb Adelakun | (England) Doncaster Rovers | 6 January 2026 | |
| 22 January 2026 | CDM | (Republic of Ireland) Liam Kinsella | (England) Hednesford Town | 22 January 2026 | |
| 3 February 2026 | CB | (England) Ibrahim Bakare | | | |
| 3 February 2026 | CM | (England) Harrison Sohna | | | |

=== New Contract ===
| Date | Pos. | Player | Contract until | Ref. |
|---|---|---|---|---|
| 2 June 2025 | DM | (Republic of Ireland) Liam Kinsella | 30 June 2026 (Note: Option of a further year) | |
| 2 July 2025 | GK | (England) Joe Day | 30 June 2027 | |
| 3 July 2025 | CM | (England) Harry Tustin | Undisclosed | |
| 3 July 2025 | CB | (England) Cameron Walters | Undisclosed | |
| 4 July 2025 | LB | (England) Freddy Willcox | 30 June 2026 | |

== Pre-season and friendlies ==
On 19 May, Cheltenham Town announced they would begin pre-season preparations with a trip to face Bishop's Cleeve. A week later, a second fixture was added, against Worcester City. A third fixture was later confirmed, against Evesham United. On 3 June, two home friendlies were announced, against Wycombe Wanderers and Swansea City. A week later, a sixth friendly was announced against Bristol City.

Win Draw Loss Fixtures

| 4 July 2025 Friendly | Bishop's Cleeve | 1–4 | Cheltenham Town | Bishop's Cleeve |
| 19:00 BST | Malshanskyj 45+1' | Report | King 6'; Jude-Boyd 60'; Obieri 64'; Miller 90+2' | Stadium: Kayte Lane; Attendance: 798 |

| 5 July 2025 Friendly | Worcester City | 2–0 | Cheltenham Town | Worcester |
| 13:30 BST | Guinan 34', 71' | Report | | Stadium: Sixways Stadium |

| 11 July 2025 Friendly | Evesham United | 1–4 | Cheltenham Town | Evesham |
| 19:00 BST | Dunbar 26' | Report | Dulson 17'; Taylor 39'; Miller 46', 52' | Stadium: The Spiers & Hartwell Stadium |

| 19 July 2025 Friendly | Cheltenham Town | 0–3 | Wycombe Wanderers | Cheltenham |
| 15:00 BST | | Report | Kone 20', 42'; Trialist 88' | Stadium: Whaddon Road; Attendance: 1,059 (164 from Wycombe); Referee: Simon Hooper |

| 23 July 2025 Friendly | Cheltenham Town | 2–1 | Swansea City | Cheltenham |
| 19:00 BST | Trialist 49'; Angol 80' | Report | Willcox 54' (o.g.) | Stadium: Whaddon Road; Attendance: 1,820 (905 from Swansea); Referee: James Durkin |

| 25 July 2025 Friendly | Cheltenham Town | 0–0 | Bristol City | Cheltenham |
| 19:45 BST | | | | Stadium: Whaddon Road; Attendance: 2,268 (1,060 from Bristol); Referee: James Durkin |

| 28 July 2025 Friendly | Cheltenham Town | 4–1 | Brentford B | Vale of Glamorgan |
| 13:00 BST | Jude-Boyd; Tustin; Croose; Trialist | Report | | Stadium: The Vale Resort; Attendance: 0 (behind closed doors) |

== Competitions ==
=== League Two ===
==== League table ====
| Pos | Team | Pld | W | D | L | GF | GA | GD | Pts |
|---|---|---|---|---|---|---|---|---|---|
| 16 | Accrington Stanley | 46 | 14 | 11 | 21 | 47 | 58 | −11 | 53 |
| 17 | Gillingham | 46 | 13 | 14 | 19 | 53 | 72 | −19 | 53 |
| 18 | Cheltenham Town | 46 | 14 | 10 | 22 | 53 | 79 | −26 | 52 |
| 19 | Shrewsbury Town | 46 | 13 | 10 | 23 | 42 | 69 | −27 | 49 |
| 20 | Newport County | 46 | 12 | 7 | 27 | 48 | 77 | −29 | 43 |

Source: EFL Official Website
Rules for classification: 1) Points; 2) Goal difference; 3) Number of goals scored; 4) Head-to-head results; 5) Wins; 6) Away goals; 7) Penalty points (sec 9.5); 8) 12-point sending off offences

==== Results summary ====
| Overall | | | | | | | | Home | | | | | | Away | | | | | |
| Pld | W | D | L | GF | GA | GD | Pts | W | D | L | GF | GA | GD | W | D | L | GF | GA | GD |
|---|---|---|---|---|---|---|---|---|---|---|---|---|---|---|---|---|---|---|---|
| 46 | 14 | 10 | 22 | 53 | 79 | −26 | 52 | 9 | 4 | 10 | 28 | 33 | −5 | 5 | 6 | 12 | 25 | 46 | −21 |

Last updated: complete.
Source: Soccerway

==== Results by round ====
| Round | 1 | 2 | 3 | 4 | 5 | 6 | 7 | 8 | 9 | 10 | 11 | 12 | 13 | 14 | 15 | 16 | 17 | 18 | 19 | 20 | 21 | 22 | 23 | 24 | 25 | 27 | 28 | 30 | 31 | 32 | 33 | 34 | 35 | 36 | 26^{1} | 37 | 38 | 39 | 41 | 42 | 43 | 29^{2} | 44 | 40^{3} | 45 | 46 |
|---|---|---|---|---|---|---|---|---|---|---|---|---|---|---|---|---|---|---|---|---|---|---|---|---|---|---|---|---|---|---|---|---|---|---|---|---|---|---|---|---|---|---|---|---|---|---|
| Ground | A | H | A | H | H | A | H | A | H | A | H | A | A | H | H | A | H | A | A | H | A | H | H | A | H | A | H | A | H | A | A | H | A | H | A | A | H | A | A | H | A | H | H | H | A | H |
| Result | L | L | L | L | L | D | W | L | L | L | W | D | W | W | L | L | W | L | W | D | W | W | L | L | W | L | L | L | L | D | D | W | D | D | D | W | D | L | L | D | W | W | W | L | L | L |
| Position | 21 | 22 | 24 | 24 | 24 | 24 | 23 | 24 | 24 | 24 | 22 | 24 | 22 | 20 | 22 | 23 | 21 | 22 | 19 | 19 | 18 | 18 | 18 | 18 | 18 | 18 | 18 | 18 | 18 | 18 | 18 | 18 | 18 | 18 | 18 | 17 | 17 | 18 | 19 | 19 | 19 | 17 | 17 | 17 | 17 | 18 |
| Points | 0 | 0 | 0 | 0 | 0 | 1 | 4 | 4 | 4 | 4 | 7 | 8 | 11 | 14 | 14 | 14 | 17 | 17 | 20 | 21 | 24 | 27 | 27 | 27 | 30 | 30 | 30 | 30 | 30 | 31 | 32 | 35 | 36 | 37 | 38 | 41 | 42 | 42 | 42 | 43 | 46 | 49 | 52 | 52 | 52 | 52 |

Source: EFL
A = Away; H = Home; W = Win; D = Draw; L = Loss; P = Postponed
Notes:
- ^{1} Matchday 26 (vs. Fleetwood Town) was postponed due to FA Cup involvements for both sides.
- ^{2} Matchday 29 (vs. Gillingham) was postponed due to a waterlogged pitch.
- ^{3} Matchday 40 (vs. Tranmere Rovers) was postponed due to international call-ups.

==== Matches ====
On 26 June, the League Two fixtures were released, with Cheltenham visiting Cambridge United on the opening day.

Win Draw Loss Fixtures

| 2 August 2025 1 | Cambridge United | 1–0 | Cheltenham Town | Cambridge |
| 15:00 BST | Appéré 59' | Report | Power (yellow card) 34'; Young (yellow card) 39' | Stadium: Abbey Stadium; Attendance: 6,673 (301 from Cheltenham); Referee: Craig Hicks |

| 9 August 2025 2 | Cheltenham Town | 0–2 | Chesterfield | Cheltenham |
| 15:00 BST | Broom (yellow card) 22'; Angol (yellow card) 25'; Bennett (yellow card) 37'; Archer (yellow card) 41'; Bickerstaff (yellow card) 62'; Jude-Boyd (yellow card) 67'; Mažionis (yellow card) 80' | Report | Gordon 47'; Bonis (yellow card) 52'; Duffy 68' | Stadium: Whaddon Road; Attendance: 4,022 (811 from Chesterfield); Referee: Benjamin Speedie |

| 16 August 2025 3 | Milton Keynes Dons | 5–0 | Cheltenham Town | Denbigh |
| 15:00 BST | Sanders 9'; Gilbey 15'; Paterson 25'; Hepburn-Murphy 60'; Collar (yellow card) 74'; Nemane 80' | Report | Mažionis (yellow card) 5'; Jude-Boyd (yellow card) 42'; Bickerstaff (yellow card) 71'; Archer (yellow card) 83' | Stadium: Stadium MK; Attendance: 6,772 (365 from Cheltenham); Referee: Jacob Miles |

| 19 August 2025 4 | Cheltenham Town | 1–2 | Bromley | Cheltenham |
| 19:45 BST | Martin 73'; Angol (yellow card) 90+3' | Report | Sowunmi 14'; Ifill (yellow card) 56'; Cheek 71' (pen.); Hondermarck (yellow card) 90+2'; Smith (yellow card) 90+4' | Stadium: Whaddon Road; Attendance: 3,016 (122 from Bromley); Referee: Rob Massey-Ellis |

| 23 August 2025 5 | Cheltenham Town | 0–1 | Barnet | Cheltenham |
| 15:00 BST | Mažionis (yellow card) 58' | Report | Hartigan (yellow card) 49'; Hawkins 62'; Osadebe (red card) 78' | Stadium: Whaddon Road; Attendance: 3,241 (327 from Barnet); Referee: Scott Jackson |

| 29 August 2025 6 | Salford City | 1–1 | Cheltenham Town | Kersal |
| 19:45 BST | Harris 90+3' | | Miller 56' | Stadium: Moor Lane; Attendance: 2,436; Referee: Alex Chilowicz |
Note: Fixture was originally scheduled for 30 August, but was moved on request from Salford.

| 6 September 2025 7 | Cheltenham Town | 1–0 | Accrington Stanley | Cheltenham |
| 15:00 BST | Hutchinson 2'; Young (yellow card) 65' | Report | Matthews (yellow card) 20'; Love (yellow card) 30'; Walton (yellow card) 68' | Stadium: Whaddon Road; Attendance: 3,284 (113 from Accrington); Referee: Abigail Byrne |

| 13 September 2025 8 | Crawley Town | 2–0 | Cheltenham Town | Crawley |
| 12:30 BST | Scott (yellow card) 16'; McKirdy 68', 84' (pen.); Adeyemo (yellow card) 90+4' | Report | Bennett (yellow card) 31' | Stadium: Broadfield Stadium; Attendance: 3,127 (222 from Cheltenham); Referee: Tom Reeves |
Note: Fixture was originally scheduled for a 15:00 kick-off, but was moved for live Sky Sports broadcasting.

| 20 September 2025 9 | Cheltenham Town | 0–3 | Oldham Athletic | Cheltenham |
| 15:00 BST | Jude-Boyd (yellow card) 54'; Willcox (yellow card) 55'; Hutchinson (yellow card) 90+4' | Report | Sutton 38'; Hannant 75' (pen.); Quigley 90' | Stadium: Whaddon Road; Attendance: 3,842 (704 from Oldham); Referee: Paul Tierney |

| 27 September 2025 10 | Grimsby Town | 7–1 | Cheltenham Town | Cleethorpes |
| 15:00 BST | Walker 39', 41'; Kabia 54'; Sweeney 59', 80'; Vernam 62'; Khouri 84' | Report | Kinsella (yellow card) 12'; Hutchinson 19', (yellow card) 55'; Pell (yellow card) 41' (yellow-red card) 45'; Angol (yellow card) 45+4' (yellow-red card) 51' | Stadium: Blundell Park; Attendance: 6,315; Referee: Carl Brook |

| 4 October 2025 11 | Cheltenham Town | 2–0 | Fleetwood Town | Cheltenham |
| 15:00 BST | Harmon (yellow card) 53'; Hutchinson 66'; Martin 69' | Report | Helm (yellow card) 31'; Bonds (yellow card) 50'; Mullarkey (yellow card) 61'; Neal (yellow card) 90+4' | Stadium: Whaddon Road; Attendance: 3,662 (104 from Fleetwood); Referee: Sam Mulhall |

| 11 October 2025 12 | Gillingham | 1–1 | Cheltenham Town | Gillingham |
| 15:00 BST | Nevitt 90+5' | Report | Martin (yellow card) 57'; Young (yellow card) 60'; Sherring 87' | Stadium: Priestfield Stadium; Attendance: 6,038 (143 from Cheltenham); Referee: Alex Chilowicz |

| 18 October 2025 13 | Newport County | 0–2 | Cheltenham Town | Newport |
| 15:00 BST | Ogunneye (yellow card) 71'; Jenkins (yellow card) 90+4'; Garner (yellow card) 90+4'; Antwi (yellow card) 90+7' | Report | Young 20', 61'; Hutchinson (yellow card) 57' | Stadium: Rodney Parade; Attendance: 4,910 (924 from Cheltenham); Referee: Peter Wright |

| 25 October 2025 14 | Cheltenham Town | 1–0 | Walsall | Cheltenham |
| 12:30 BST | Tomkinson (yellow card) 36'; Young (yellow card) 45+4'; Flint 90+2' (o.g.) | Report | Okeke (yellow card) 49' | Stadium: Whaddon Road; Attendance: 4,569 (1,052 from Walsall); Referee: Oliver Yates |
Note: Fixture was originally scheduled for a 15:00 kick-off, but was rescheduled for live Sky Sports broadcasting.

| 10 November 2025 15 | Cheltenham Town | 1–2 | Notts County | Cheltenham |
| 20:00 GMT | Hutchinson 66' | | Jatta 23'; Hall 27'; Tsaroulla (yellow card) 45+1'; Iorpenda (yellow card) 67'; Bedeau (yellow card) 76' | Stadium: Whaddon Road; Attendance: 4,034; Referee: Ben Speedie |
Note: Fixture was originally scheduled for 8 November, but was rescheduled for live Sky Sports broadcasting.

| 15 November 2025 16 | Tranmere Rovers | 3–2 | Cheltenham Town | Birkenhead |
| 15:00 GMT | Wilson 2' (o.g.); Ironside 11'; Smith (yellow card) 66'; Smallwood 73'; Whitaker 86' | Report | Thomas 34'; Martin 77'; Young (yellow card) 85' | Stadium: Prenton Park; Attendance: 6,841 (220 from Cheltenham); Referee: Oliver Langford |

| 22 November 2025 17 | Cheltenham Town | 1–0 | Bristol Rovers | Cheltenham |
| 15:00 GMT | Wilson (yellow card) 13'; Tomkinson (yellow card) 67', (goal) 70'; Thomas (yellow card) 79'; Adelakun (yellow card) 90+5' | Report | Conteh (yellow card) 90+4' | Stadium: Whaddon Road; Attendance: 5,465 (1,519 from Bristol); Referee: Paul Howard |

| 29 November 2025 18 | Colchester United | 2–0 | Cheltenham Town | Colchester |
| 15:00 GMT | Lisbie 8'; Mbick 50'; Read (penalty missed) 53'; Anderson (yellow card) 77' | Report | Stevenson (yellow card) 11'; Hutchinson (yellow card) 43' | Stadium: Colchester Community Stadium; Attendance: 4,684 (165 from Cheltenham); Referee: Elliot Bell |

| 9 December 2025 19 | Swindon Town | 0–1 | Cheltenham Town | Swindon |
| 19:45 GMT | Nichols (yellow card) 41'; Knight-Lebel (yellow card) 45+1' | Report | Archer 59'; Jude-Boyd (yellow card) 68'; Day (yellow card) 90+5' | Stadium: County Ground; Attendance: 7,540 (620 from Cheltenham); Referee: Simon Mather |

| 13 December 2025 20 | Cheltenham Town | 1–1 | Harrogate Town | Harrogate |
| 15:00 GMT | Bickerstaff 73'; Tomkinson (yellow card) 77'; Wilson (yellow card) 79' | Report | McAleny 80' (pen.); Muldoon (yellow card) 90+2' | Stadium: Whaddon Road; Attendance: 4,067 (94 from Harrogate); Referee: Michael Barlow |

| 19 December 2025 21 | Barrow | 1–2 | Cheltenham Town | Barrow-in-Furness |
| 19:45 GMT | Whitfield 47' | Report | Adelakun 39'; Archer 84' | Stadium: Holker Street; Attendance: 2,140 (94 from Cheltenham); Referee: Thomas Parsons |
Note: Fixture was originally scheduled for 20 December, but was moved following an agreement from both sides.

| 26 December 2025 22 | Cheltenham Town | 3–1 | Shrewsbury Town | Cheltenham |
| 15:00 GMT | Adelakun 14'; Bickerstaff 31'; Hutchinson 54' (pen.); Day (yellow card) 70'; Jude-Boyd (yellow card) 89' | Report | Marquis 63'; Boyle (yellow card) 73'; Perry (yellow card) 90'; McDermott (yellow card) 90+2' | Stadium: Whaddon Road; Attendance: 5,553 (621 from Shrewsbury); Referee: Richard Eley |

| 29 December 2025 23 | Cheltenham Town | 0–2 | Swindon Town | Cheltenham |
| 19:45 GMT | | Report | McGregor (yellow card) 54'; Drinan 57'; Mabete 75'; Ball (yellow card) 90+5' | Stadium: Whaddon Road; Attendance: 5,980 (1,054 from Swindon); Referee: Isaac Searle |

| 1 January 2026 24 | Crewe Alexandra | 4–1 | Cheltenham Town | Crewe |
| 15:00 GMT | Holíček 1'; March 22', 77'; Connolly 34' | Report | Adelakun (yellow card) 20'; Miller 43' | Stadium: Gresty Road; Attendance: 4,982 (287 from Cheltenham); Referee: Dale Baines |

| 4 January 2026 25 | Cheltenham Town | 3–0 | Crawley Town | Cheltenham |
| 12:00 GMT | Adelakun 62'; Thomas 69'; Cundy 76'; Power (yellow card) 90+2' | Report | Russell (yellow card) 33'; McKirdy (yellow card) 89' | Stadium: Whaddon Road; Attendance: 3,211 (218 from Crawley); Referee: Craig Hicks |
Note: Fixture was originally scheduled for a 15:00 kick-off, but was rescheduled for live Sky Sports broadcasting.

| 17 January 2026 27 | Oldham Athletic | 2–1 | Cheltenham Town | Oldham |
| 15:00 GMT | Garner 45'; Payne 60'; Woods (yellow card) 73'; Quigley (yellow card) 83'; Hawkes (yellow card) 85'; Caprice (yellow card) 90+1' | Report | Thomas 26' (pen.); Kinsella (yellow card) 90+5' | Stadium: Boundary Park; Attendance: 6,315 (220 from Cheltenham); Referee: Neil Hair |

| 24 January 2026 28 | Cheltenham Town | 0–2 | Grimsby Town | Cheltenham |
| 15:00 GMT | Cundy (yellow card) 45+1'; Stevenson (yellow card) 57' | Report | Green 5'; Turi (yellow card) 30'; Khouri (yellow card) 45'; Rodgers (yellow card) 58'; Cook 74' | Stadium: Whaddon Road; Attendance: 3,921; Referee: Harry Wager |

| 31 January 2026 30 | Accrington Stanley | 3–1 | Cheltenham Town | Accrington |
| 15:00 GMT | Whalley 8'; Love 45+2'; Henderson (yellow card) 55'; Matthews 59' | Report | Cundy (yellow card) 45+1'; Thomas 73'; Davison (yellow card) 77' | Stadium: Crown Ground; Attendance: 2,052 (171 from Cheltenham); Referee: Stephen Parkinson |

| 7 February 2026 31 | Cheltenham Town | 2–3 | Milton Keynes Dons | Cheltenham |
| 15:00 GMT | Bickerstaff 45+2'; Hutchinson 87'; Nurse (yellow card) 90+5' | Report | Offord (yellow card) 19'; Nelson 32'; Paterson 37'; Ekpiteta 64'; Gilbey (yellow card) 81'; Mellish (yellow card) 85'; Kelly (yellow card) 89' | Stadium: Whaddon Road; Attendance: 3,749 (624 from Milton Keynes); Referee: Carl Brook |

| 14 February 2026 32 | Barnet | 0–0 | Cheltenham Town | Edgware |
| 12:30 GMT | Kizzi (yellow card) 48'; Glover (yellow card) 52'; Ofoborh (yellow card) 82'; Tavares (yellow card) 90' | Report | Hutchinson (yellow card) 31'; Jude-Boyd (yellow card) 84' (yellow-red card) 90+9' | Stadium: The Hive Stadium; Attendance: 2,429 (289 from Cheltenham); Referee: Sam Mulhall |
Note: Fixture was initially scheduled for a 15:00 kick-off, but was rescheduled for live Sky Sports broadcasting.

| 17 February 2026 33 | Bromley | 1–1 | Cheltenham Town | Bromley |
| 19:45 GMT | Pinnock 4'; Hondermarck (yellow card) 49'; Smith (yellow card) 71'; Odutayo (yellow card) 80' | Report | Hutchinson 25', (yellow card) 71'; Wilson (yellow card) 55' | Stadium: Hayes Lane; Referee: Elliott Swallow |

| 21 February 2026 34 | Cheltenham Town | 3–2 | Salford City | Cheltenham |
| 15:00 GMT | Hutchinson 51' (pen.), (yellow card) 73'; Ashfield 84'; Miller 90+6' | Report | Grant 6'; Harris (yellow card) 14'; Garbutt (red card) 48'; Woodburn (yellow card) 49'; Young (yellow card) 71'; Graydon (yellow card) 73'; Ashley (yellow card) 73'; Awe 76' | Stadium: Whaddon Road; Attendance: 3,523 (114 from Salford); Referee: Abigail Byrne |

| 27 February 2026 35 | Harrogate Town | 1–1 | Cheltenham Town | Harrogate |
| 19:45 GMT | Heffernan 50' | Report | Hutchinson 46'; Tomkinson (yellow card) 74'; Young (yellow card) 90+2' | Stadium: Wetherby Road; Attendance: 3,024 (182 from Cheltenham); Referee: Oliver Yates |
Note: Fixture was originally scheduled for 28 February, but was moved following an agreement from both sides.

| 6 March 2025 36 | Cheltenham Town | 2–2 | Barrow | Cheltenham |
| 19:45 GMT | Davison 15'; Cundy (yellow card) 24'; Hutchinson 90' | Report | Fletcher 39', (yellow card) 85'; Gordon (penalty missed) 59', 59'; Rose (yellow card) 82' | Stadium: Whaddon Road; Attendance: 3,753 (154 from Barrow); Referee: Kirsty Dowle |
Note: Fixture was originally scheduled for 28 February, but was moved following an agreement from both sides.

| 10 March 2026 26 | Fleetwood Town | 2–2 | Cheltenham Town | Fleetwood |
| 19:45 GMT | Helm 17', 45+1'; Powell (yellow card) 21'; Lynch (yellow card) 85' | Report | Miller (yellow card) 38'; Thomas 57'; Cundy (yellow card) 63'; Hutchinson 74'; Davison (yellow card) 85' | Stadium: Highbury Stadium; Attendance: 2,255; Referee: David Rock |
Note: Fixture was originally scheduled for 10 January, but it was postponed due to FA Cup involvements for both teams.

| 14 March 2026 37 | Shrewsbury Town | 0–2 | Cheltenham Town | Shrewsbury |
| 15:00 GMT | Perry (yellow card) 35'; Berkoe (yellow card) 90+8' | Report | Cundy (yellow card) 17'; Young (yellow card) 19'; Thomas 63'; Sherring 71'; Day (yellow card) 90+2' | Stadium: New Meadow; Attendance: 5,786; Referee: Lewis Sandoe |

| 17 March 2026 38 | Cheltenham Town | 1–1 | Crewe Alexandra | Cheltenham |
| 19:45 GMT | Young (yellow card) 51'; Bickerstaff 55', (yellow card) 79'; Tomkinson (yellow card) 70' | Report | Lankester (yellow card) 80'; Connolly 85' | Stadium: Whaddon Road; Attendance: 3,003; Referee: Steven Copeland |

| 21 March 2026 39 | Notts County | 5–2 | Cheltenham Town | Nottingham |
| 15:00 GMT | Jones 16'; Palmer 28'; Macari (yellow card) 46'; Bedeau (yellow card) 59'; Iorpenda 66'; Wilson 72'; Hall 90+4' | Report | Hutchinson 10', 35', (yellow card) 90+1'; Ashfield (yellow card) 49'; Sherring (red card) 81'; Tomkinson (yellow card) 90+2' | Stadium: Meadow Lane; Attendance: 10,467; Referee: Elliot Bell |

| 3 April 2026 41 | Chesterfield | 1–0 | Cheltenham Town | Chesterfield |
| 15:00 BST | Dickson 25'; Mandeville (yellow card) 35' | Report | Cundy (yellow card) 54' | Stadium: SMH Group Stadium; Attendance: 8,072 (277 away); Referee: James Durkin |

| 6 April 2026 42 | Cheltenham Town | 1–1 | Cambridge United | Cheltenham |
| 15:00 BST | Eastwood 90+1' (o.g.) | Report | Kaikai 34' | Stadium: Whaddon Road; Attendance: 4,194; Referee: James Oldham |

| 11 April 2026 43 | Walsall | 0–4 | Cheltenham Town | Bescot |
| 15:00 BST | | Report | Ashfield 56'; Hutchinson 63'; Miller 69'; Martin 90+3' | Stadium: Bescot Stadium; Attendance: 6,103; Referee: Alan Dale |

| 14 April 2026 29 | Cheltenham Town | 2–1 | Gillingham | Cheltenham |
| 19:45 BST | Hutchinson 63'; Faal (yellow card) 74', (goal) 90+5' | Report | Hale 18' | Stadium: Whaddon Road; Attendance: 3,161 (235 from Gillingham); Referee: Harrison Blair |
Note: Fixture was postponed due to a waterlogged pitch.

| 18 April 2026 44 | Cheltenham Town | 1–0 | Newport County | Cheltenham |
| 15:00 BST | Miller 82'; Hutchinson (yellow card) 90+2' | Report | Baker (yellow card) 16'; Biggins (yellow card) 62'; Evans (yellow card) 68'; Crole (yellow card) 84' | Stadium: Whaddon Road; Attendance: 4,658 (1,049 from Newport); Referee: Simon Mather |

| 21 April 2026 40 | Cheltenham Town | 1–3 | Tranmere Rovers | Cheltenham |
| 19:45 BST | Miller 40'; Hutchinson (yellow card) 90+4' | Report | Smith 47'; Joseph 64'; Patrick 85' | Stadium: Whaddon Road; Attendance: 3,312; Referee: Stephen Parkinson |
Note: Fixture was initially scheduled for 28 March, but was needed to be rearranged due to international call-ups in the Tranmere squad.

| 11 April 2026 45 | Bristol Rovers | 4–0 | Cheltenham Town | Bristol |
| 15:00 BST | Harrison 2', 45+3', 56'; Smallwood (yellow card) 6'; Balmer (yellow card) 32'; Sparkes (yellow card) 55'; Leigh (yellow card) 71'; Forde 87'; Lockyer (yellow card) 90+1' | Report | Wilson (yellow card) 71' | Stadium: Memorial Stadium; Attendance: 11,126 (1,115 from Cheltenham); Referee: Michael Barlow |

| 2 May 2026 46 | Cheltenham Town | 1–4 | Colchester United | Cheltenham |
| 15:00 BST | Young (yellow card) 5'; Miller 55' | Report | Tovide 3'; Read 23'; Anderson 31'; Edwards (yellow card) 74'; Barbrook 90' | Stadium: Whaddon Road; Attendance: 4,562 (541 from Colchester); Referee: Tom Reeves |

=== FA Cup ===
Cheltenham were drawn at home to Bradford City in the first round, Buxton in the second round and Leicester City in the third round.

Win Draw Loss Fixtures

| 1 November 2025 First round | Cheltenham Town | 1–0 | Bradford City | Cheltenham |
| 15:00 GMT | Hutchinson 2'; Jude-Boyd (yellow card) 53' | Report | Wright (yellow card) 2'; Pennington (yellow card) 16'; Bynre (yellow card) 79' | Stadium: Whaddon Road; Attendance: 3,075 (551 from Bradford); Referee: Rob Massey-Ellis |

| 6 December 2025 Second round | Cheltenham Town | 6–2 | Buxton | Cheltenham |
| 15:00 GMT | Hutchinson 29', 74'; Jude-Boyd (yellow card) 45+1'; Cundy 58'; Thomas 62', 90'; Archer 79' | Report | Sodje 13'; Ward 45+2'; Johnston (yellow card) 69'; Bardell (yellow card) 86' | Stadium: Whaddon Road; Attendance: 3,589 (514 from Buxton); Referee: Charles Breakspear |

| 10 January 2026 Third round | Cheltenham Town | 0–2 | Leicester City | Cheltenham |
| 12:15 GMT | Tomkinson (yellow card) 87' | Report | Daka 23'; Mavididi 45'; Thomas (yellow card) 87' | Stadium: Whaddon Road; Attendance: 6,677 (1,050 from Leicester); Referee: James Linington |

=== EFL Cup ===
Cheltenham were drawn at home to Exeter City in the first round and away to Cardiff City in the second round.

Win Draw Loss Fixtures

| 13 August 2025 First round | Cheltenham Town | 2–0 | Exeter City | Cheltenham |
| 19:45 BST | Wilson 28'; Mažionis (yellow card) 34'; Archer (yellow card) 40'; Broom 55'; Willcox (yellow card) 89' | Report | Francis (yellow card) 15'; James (yellow card) 16'; McDonald (yellow card) 52'; Cummins (yellow card) 83' | Stadium: Whaddon Road; Attendance: 2,109 (488 from Exeter); Referee: Alan Young |

| 26 August 2025 Second round | Cardiff City | 3–0 | Cheltenham Town | Leckwith |
| 19:45 BST | Davies 11'; Robinson (yellow card) 26'; Chambers 32'; Colwill 51'; Ng (yellow card) 56' | Report | Angol (penalty missed) 38', (yellow card) 45+3'; Mažionis (yellow card) 90+1' | Stadium: Cardiff City Stadium; Attendance: 6,233; Referee: Edward Duckworth |

=== EFL Trophy ===
Cheltenham were drawn against Bristol Rovers, Plymouth Argyle and Tottenham Hotspur U21 in the group stage.

| Pos | Div | Team | Pld | W | PW | PL | L | GF | GA | GD | Pts | Qualification |
|---|---|---|---|---|---|---|---|---|---|---|---|---|
| 1 | L2 | Bristol Rovers | 3 | 2 | 1 | 0 | 0 | 6 | 4 | +2 | 8 | Advance to Round 2 |
| 2 | L1 | Plymouth Argyle | 3 | 2 | 0 | 0 | 1 | 8 | 3 | +5 | 6 | Advance to Round 2 |
| 3 | L2 | Cheltenham Town | 3 | 0 | 1 | 0 | 2 | 2 | 5 | −3 | 2 | |
| 4 | ACA | Tottenham Hotspur U21 | 3 | 0 | 0 | 2 | 1 | 8 | 12 | −4 | 2 | |

Source: EFL

Win Draw Loss Fixtures

| 2 September 2025 South Group B | Plymouth Argyle | 2–0 | Cheltenham Town | Plymouth |
| 19:00 BST | Tolaj 5', 45'; Edwards (yellow card) 49'; Pepple (penalty missed) 81'; Wiredu (yellow card) 84' | Report | Walters (yellow card) 1'; Tustin (yellow card) 68'; Bennett (red card) 79' | Stadium: Home Park; Attendance: 3,726 (64 from Cheltenham); Referee: Ross Martin |

| 7 October 2025 South Group B | Cheltenham Town | 0–1 | Bristol Rovers | Cheltenham |
| 19:00 BST | | Report | Thomas 60'; Sotiriou (yellow card) 78' | Stadium: Whaddon Road; Attendance: 1,713 (366 from Bristol); Referee: Matthew Russell |

| 28 October 2025 South Group B | Cheltenham Town | 2–2 (3–1 p) | Tottenham Hotspur U21 | Cheltenham |
| 19:00 GMT | Martin 5'; Willcox (yellow card) 8'; Kinsella (yellow card) 29'; Taylor 67'; Harmon (yellow card) 90' | Report | Irow 25'; Cassanova (yellow card) 59'; Kyerematen 89' | Stadium: Whaddon Road; Attendance: 2,383 (176 from Tottenham); Referee: Declan Brown |
| | Penalties |
| | Pell (penalty scored); Sohna (penalty scored); Taylor (penalty scored) | | (penalty missed) Kyerematen; (penalty scored) Batty; (penalty missed) Black; (penalty missed) Russell-Denny |

== Statistics ==
=== Appearances and goals ===
Players with no appearances are not included on the list; italics indicate a loaned in player

| No. | Pos | Nat | Player | Total | | League Two | | FA Cup | | EFL Cup | | EFL Trophy | |
| No. | Pos | Nat | Player | Apps | Goals | Apps | Goals | Apps | Goals | Apps | Goals | Apps | Goals |
|---|---|---|---|---|---|---|---|---|---|---|---|---|---|
| 1 | GK | (England) ENG | Joe Day | 52 | 0 | 46+0 | 0 | 3+0 | 0 | 2+0 | 0 | 1+0 | 0 |
| 2 | DF | (Saint Lucia) LCA | Arkell Jude-Boyd | 42 | 0 | 28+9 | 0 | 1+1 | 0 | 1+1 | 0 | 0+1 | 0 |
| 3 | DF | (England) ENG | George Harmon | 15 | 0 | 2+8 | 0 | 0+1 | 0 | 2+0 | 0 | 2+0 | 0 |
| 4 | MF | (Wales) WAL | Harry Ashfield | 17 | 2 | 9+8 | 2 | 0+0 | 0 | 0+0 | 0 | 0+0 | 0 |
| 5 | DF | (Wales) WAL | James Wilson | 46 | 1 | 41+1 | 0 | 3+0 | 0 | 1+0 | 1 | 0+0 | 0 |
| 6 | DF | (England) ENG | Robbie Cundy | 29 | 2 | 25+0 | 1 | 1+1 | 1 | 1+0 | 0 | 1+0 | 0 |
| 7 | MF | (England) ENG | Cole Deeming | 17 | 0 | 5+12 | 0 | 0+0 | 0 | 0+0 | 0 | 0+0 | 0 |
| 8 | MF | (England) ENG | Luke Young | 50 | 2 | 40+5 | 2 | 3+0 | 0 | 1+0 | 0 | 0+1 | 0 |
| 9 | FW | (England) ENG | Josh Davison | 16 | 1 | 11+5 | 1 | 0+0 | 0 | 0+0 | 0 | 0+0 | 0 |
| 10 | FW | (England) ENG | George Miller | 32 | 7 | 19+10 | 7 | 0+0 | 0 | 0+2 | 0 | 0+1 | 0 |
| 11 | FW | (England) ENG | Jordan Thomas | 43 | 8 | 35+4 | 6 | 3+0 | 2 | 1+0 | 0 | 0+0 | 0 |
| 14 | MF | (Wales) WAL | Ryan Broom | 36 | 1 | 12+18 | 0 | 1+1 | 0 | 2+0 | 1 | 2+0 | 0 |
| 16 | FW | (England) ENG | Josh Martin | 32 | 5 | 6+21 | 4 | 1+1 | 0 | 1+0 | 0 | 2+0 | 1 |
| 17 | MF | (England) ENG | Scot Bennett | 9 | 0 | 6+0 | 0 | 1+0 | 0 | 0+1 | 0 | 0+1 | 0 |
| 20 | FW | (Wales) WAL | Jake Bickerstaff | 50 | 4 | 32+13 | 4 | 3+0 | 0 | 1+0 | 0 | 1+0 | 0 |
| 21 | DF | (England) ENG | George Nurse | 14 | 0 | 6+7 | 0 | 1+0 | 0 | 0+0 | 0 | 0+0 | 0 |
| 22 | FW | (The Gambia) GAM | Mo Faal | 8 | 1 | 0+8 | 1 | 0+0 | 0 | 0+0 | 0 | 0+0 | 0 |
| 23 | MF | (England) ENG | Isaac Hutchinson | 36 | 18 | 33+1 | 15 | 2+0 | 3 | 0+0 | 0 | 0+0 | 0 |
| 24 | DF | (England) ENG | Sam Sherring | 25 | 2 | 21+2 | 2 | 1+0 | 0 | 0+0 | 0 | 1+0 | 0 |
| 26 | MF | (England) ENG | Ben Stevenson | 33 | 0 | 30+0 | 0 | 3+0 | 0 | 0+0 | 0 | 0+0 | 0 |
| 27 | DF | (United States) USA | Jonathan Tomkinson | 38 | 1 | 35+0 | 1 | 3+0 | 0 | 0+0 | 0 | 0+0 | 0 |
| 28 | MF | (England) ENG | Tommy Backwell | 5 | 0 | 0+1 | 0 | 0+0 | 0 | 0+1 | 0 | 3+0 | 0 |
| 29 | FW | (England) ENG | Tom King | 3 | 0 | 0+0 | 0 | 0+0 | 0 | 0+0 | 0 | 0+3 | 0 |
| 30 | DF | (England) ENG | Freddy Willcox | 12 | 0 | 5+1 | 0 | 0+1 | 0 | 0+2 | 0 | 3+0 | 0 |
| 38 | MF | (England) ENG | Harry Tustin | 6 | 0 | 0+2 | 0 | 0+0 | 0 | 0+1 | 0 | 1+2 | 0 |
| 40 | DF | (England) ENG | Cameron Walters | 2 | 0 | 0+0 | 0 | 0+0 | 0 | 0+0 | 0 | 1+1 | 0 |
| 41 | GK | (England) ENG | Mamadou Diallo | 2 | 0 | 0+0 | 0 | 0+0 | 0 | 0+0 | 0 | 2+0 | 0 |
| 42 | MF | (England) ENG | Mark Barber | 3 | 0 | 0+1 | 0 | 0+0 | 0 | 0+1 | 0 | 1+0 | 0 |
Players who featured but departed the club during the season:
| 4 | MF | (Republic of Ireland) IRL | Liam Kinsella | 26 | 0 | 10+11 | 0 | 1+1 | 0 | 1+0 | 0 | 2+0 | 0 |
| 7 | MF | (England) ENG | Harry Pell | 5 | 0 | 1+2 | 0 | 0+0 | 0 | 0+0 | 0 | 2+0 | 0 |
| 9 | FW | (England) ENG | Lee Angol | 11 | 0 | 6+3 | 0 | 0+0 | 0 | 1+0 | 0 | 1+0 | 0 |
| 12 | DF | (Republic of Ireland) IRL | Darragh Power | 19 | 0 | 5+9 | 0 | 0+1 | 0 | 2+0 | 0 | 2+0 | 0 |
| 15 | FW | (England) ENG | Tom Taylor | 16 | 1 | 1+11 | 0 | 0+2 | 0 | 0+0 | 0 | 2+0 | 1 |
| 18 | DF | (England) ENG | Ibrahim Bakare | 3 | 0 | 1+0 | 0 | 0+0 | 0 | 0+1 | 0 | 1+0 | 0 |
| 19 | DF | (Lithuania) LTU | Jokūbas Mažionis | 9 | 0 | 6+1 | 0 | 0+0 | 0 | 2+0 | 0 | 0+0 | 0 |
| 22 | MF | (England) ENG | Ethon Archer | 28 | 3 | 22+2 | 2 | 1+1 | 1 | 2+0 | 0 | 0+0 | 0 |
| 23 | DF | (England) ENG | Taine Anderson | 1 | 0 | 1+0 | 0 | 0+0 | 0 | 0+0 | 0 | 0+0 | 0 |
| 25 | MF | (England) ENG | Harrison Sohna | 3 | 0 | 0+0 | 0 | 0+0 | 0 | 1+0 | 0 | 2+0 | 0 |
| 31 | FW | (England) ENG | Hakeeb Adelakun | 12 | 3 | 6+5 | 3 | 1+0 | 0 | 0+0 | 0 | 0+0 | 0 |
