= McTier =

McTier is a surname. Notable people with the surname include:

- Duncan McTier, British musician
- Samuel McTier (1737/38–1795), Irish revolutionary
- Martha McTier (c. 1742–1837), Irish writer and activist

== See also ==
- McTeer
- Mactier (disambiguation)
- McTiernan
