= 2025–26 Ipswich Town F.C. season =

English football club season

Ipswich Town
2025–26 season
- Owner: Gamechanger 20 Ltd
- Chairman: Mark Ashton
- Manager: Kieran McKenna
- Stadium: Portman Road
- Championship: 2nd (promoted)
- FA Cup: Fourth round
- EFL Cup: First round
- Top goalscorer: League: Jack Clarke (16); All: Jack Clarke (16)
- Highest home attendance: 29,809 (vs Norwich City, Championship, 5 October 2025)
- Lowest home attendance: 25,539 (vs Bristol City, Championship, 20 January 2026)
- Average home league attendance: 28,303
- Biggest win: 5–0 (vs Sheffield United (H), Championship, 12 September 2025)
- Biggest defeat: 0–3 (vs Charlton Athletic (H), Championship, 21 October 2025)
Home colours	Away colours	Third colours

The 2025–26 season was the 148th season in the history of Ipswich Town Football Club, and their first season back in the Championship since the 2023–24 campaign, following relegation from the Premier League in the preceding season. In addition to the domestic league, the club also competed in the FA Cup and the EFL Cup.

On 30 June 2025, it was announced that Ipswich would be changing the front-of-shirt sponsor for the first time since 2021 from Ed Sheeran's +−=÷× Tour to HaloITSM, Ed Sheeran's hot sauce brand, Tingly's Ted announced as new sleeve sponsor.

On 2 May 2026, in the final match of the season, Ipswich won promotion back to the Premier League after only one season away following a 3–0 victory against Queens Park Rangers at Portman Road.

== First-team key staff ==
Position	Name
Manager	(Northern Ireland) Kieran McKenna
Assistant Manager	(England) Martyn Pert
First-Team Coaches	(Nigeria) Sone Aluko
First-Team Coaches	(England) Mark Hudson
First-Team Coaches	(England) Charlie Turnbull
First-Team Coaches	(England) Junior Stanislas
Goalkeeping Coaches	(Republic of Ireland) Rene Gilmartin
Goalkeeping Coaches	(England) David Button
Fitness Coach	(England) Jon Ashton
Director of Football Operations	(England) Dmitri Halajko
Director of Performance	(England) Andy Rolls
Head of Analysis	(Republic of Ireland) Cillian Callaly
Head of Recruitment	(England) Will Stephenson
Head of Athletic Performance	(England) Matt Allen
Head Physiotherapist	(England) Matt Byard
Head of Strength & Conditioning	(England) Dan Peacock
Sports Scientist	(England) Kit Barnes
Sports Therapist	(England) Alice Gindrod
Kit Manager	(England) Lee Owen

== First-team squad ==
As of 30 June 2026

No.	Player	Position(s)	Nationality	Place of birth	Date of birth (age)	Signed from	Date signed	Fee	Contract end
Goalkeepers
1	Alex Palmer	GK	(England)	Kidderminster	10 August 1996 (aged 29)	West Bromwich Albion	3 February 2025	£2,000,000	30 June 2028
27	David Button	GK (Note: Player-coach)	(England)	Stevenage	27 February 1989 (aged 37)	Reading	3 February 2025	Free transfer	30 June 2026
28	Christian Walton	GK	(England)	Wadebridge	9 November 1995 (aged 30)	Brighton & Hove Albion	19 January 2022	Undisclosed	30 June 2028
Defenders
3	Leif Davis	LB	(England)	Newcastle upon Tyne	31 December 1999 (aged 26)	Leeds United	25 July 2022	£1,200,000	30 June 2029
4	Cédric Kipré	CB	(Ivory Coast)	(France) Paris	9 December 1996 (aged 29)	Reims	13 July 2025	Loan	31 May 2026
15	Ashley Young	RB/LB	(England)	Stevenage	9 July 1985 (aged 40)	Everton	23 July 2025	Free transfer	31 May 2026
18	Ben Johnson	RB/LB	(England)	Waltham Forest	24 January 2000 (aged 26)	West Ham United	1 July 2024	Free transfer	30 June 2028
19	Darnell Furlong	RB/LB	(England)	Luton	31 October 1995 (aged 30)	West Bromwich Albion	28 August 2025	£3,500,000	30 June 2028
22	Conor Townsend	LB	(England)	Hessle	4 March 1993 (aged 33)	West Bromwich Albion	1 August 2024	£500,000	30 June 2026
24	Jacob Greaves	CB	(England)	Cottingham	12 September 2000 (aged 25)	Hull City	12 July 2024	Undisclosed	30 June 2029
25	Elkan Baggott	CB	(Indonesia)	(Thailand) Bangkok	23 October 2002 (aged 23)	Academy	28 January 2021	—N/a	30 June 2028
26	Dara O'Shea	CB	(Republic of Ireland)	Dublin	4 March 1999 (aged 27)	Burnley	25 August 2024	Undisclosed	30 June 2030
Midfielders
5	Azor Matusiwa	CM	(Netherlands)	Hilversum	28 April 1998 (aged 28)	Rennes	13 July 2025	£7,800,000	30 June 2029
6	Dan Neil	CM	(England)	South Shields	13 December 2001 (aged 24)	Sunderland	27 January 2026	Loan	30 June 2026
7	Wes Burns	RW	(Wales)	Cardiff	23 November 1994 (aged 31)	Fleetwood Town	1 July 2021	Undisclosed	30 June 2026
12	Jens Cajuste	CM	(Sweden)	Gothenburg	10 August 1999 (aged 26)	Napoli	7 August 2025	Loan	31 May 2026
14	Jack Taylor	CM	(Republic of Ireland)	(England) Hammersmith	23 June 1998 (aged 28)	Peterborough United	26 June 2023	£1,500,000	30 June 2028
32	Marcelino Núñez	CM	(Chile)	Recoleta	1 March 2000 (aged 26)	Norwich City	29 August 2025	£7,500,000	30 June 2029
Forwards
8	Sindre Walle Egeli	RW/SS	(Norway)	Larvik	21 June 2006 (aged 20)	Nordsjælland	29 August 2025	£17,500,000	30 June 2030
9	George Hirst	CF	(Scotland)	(England) Sheffield	15 February 1999 (aged 27)	Leicester City	13 July 2023	Undisclosed	30 June 2029
11	Jaden Philogene	LW/RW	(England)	Hammersmith	8 February 2002 (aged 24)	Aston Villa	15 January 2025	Undisclosed	30 June 2029
20	Kasey McAteer	RW	(Republic of Ireland)	(England) Northampton	22 November 2001 (aged 24)	Leicester City	22 August 2025	£11,500,000	30 June 2029
29	Chuba Akpom	CF/SS	(England)	Newham	9 October 1995 (aged 30)	Ajax	10 August 2025	Loan	31 May 2026
31	Iván Azón	CF	(Spain)	Zaragoza	24 December 2002 (aged 23)	Como	28 August 2025	Loan	31 May 2026
33	Anis Mehmeti	LW/SS	(Albania)	(England) Islington	9 January 2001 (aged 25)	Bristol City	23 January 2026	£3,000,000	30 June 2029
47	Jack Clarke	LW	(England)	York	23 November 2000 (aged 25)	Sunderland	24 August 2024	Undisclosed	30 June 2029
Out on loan
2	Harry Clarke	RB	(England)	Ipswich	2 March 2001 (aged 25)	Arsenal	19 January 2023	Undisclosed	30 June 2026
10	Conor Chaplin	SS/CF	(England)	Worthing	16 February 1997 (aged 29)	Barnsley	27 July 2021	£875,000	30 June 2026
13	Cieran Slicker	GK	(Scotland)	(England) Oldham	15 September 2002 (aged 23)	Manchester City	8 July 2023	Undisclosed	30 June 2028
16	Ali Al-Hamadi	CF	(Iraq)	Maysan	1 March 2002 (aged 24)	AFC Wimbledon	29 January 2024	£1,000,000	30 June 2028
21	Chiedozie Ogbene	RW	(Republic of Ireland)	(Nigeria) Lagos	1 May 1997 (aged 29)	Luton Town	28 August 2024	Undisclosed	30 June 2028
23	Sammie Szmodics	SS/CF	(Republic of Ireland)	(England) Colchester	24 September 1995 (aged 30)	Blackburn Rovers	16 August 2024	Undisclosed	30 June 2028
30	Cameron Humphreys	CM	(England)	Colchester	30 October 2003 (aged 22)	Academy	1 July 2022	—N/a	30 June 2026
49	Arijanet Muric	GK	(Kosovo)	(Switzerland) Schlieren	7 November 1998 (aged 27)	Burnley	17 July 2024	Undisclosed	30 June 2028

== Transfers and contracts ==
=== In ===
Date	Pos	Nationality	Player	From	Fee	Ref
First team
4 July 2025	GK (Note: Signed as player-coach)	(England)	David Button	(England) Reading	Free transfer	
13 July 2025	CM	(Netherlands)	Azor Matusiwa	(France) Rennes	£7,800,000	
23 July 2025	RB	(England)	Ashley Young	(England) Everton	Free transfer	
22 August 2025	RW	(Republic of Ireland)	Kasey McAteer	(England) Leicester City	£11,500,000	
28 August 2025	RB	(England)	Darnell Furlong	(England) West Bromwich Albion	£3,500,000	
29 August 2025	CM	(Chile)	Marcelino Núñez	(England) Norwich City	£7,500,000	
29 August 2025	RW	(Norway)	Sindre Walle Egeli	(Denmark) FC Nordsjælland	£17,500,000	
23 January 2026	CAM	(Albania)	Anis Mehmeti	(England) Bristol City	£3,000,000	
Academy
2 September 2025	MF	(England)	Tyler Young	(England) Peterborough United	Free transfer	
2 February 2026	MF	(England)	Ryan Doherty	(England) Stevenage	Undisclosed	
Women's team
14 July 2025	CB	(England)	Paige Peake	(England) Southampton	Free transfer	
22 July 2025 (Note: Joined last season on dual-registration before being offered a full contract)	W	(England)	Ruby Seaby	(England) Arsenal	Free transfer	
22 July 2025	CF	(England)	Rianna Dean	(England) Southampton	Free transfer	
30 July 2025	CM	(England)	Ruby Doe	(England) West Ham	Free transfer	
31 July 2025	RB	(England)	Bethan Roe	(England) Charlton Athletic	Free transfer	
31 July 2025	CM	(England)	Jenna Dear	(England) Sunderland	Free transfer	
31 July 2025	RB	(New Zealand)	Grace Neville	(England) London City Lionesses	Free transfer	
3 August 2025	CM	(England)	Sophie Baigent	(England) Hashtag United	Free transfer	
19 January 2026	CM	(Scotland)	Colette Cavanagh	(Spain) Deportivo de La Coruña	Free transfer	
20 January 2026	W	(England)	Lucy Ashworth-Clifford	(Italy) Lazio	Undisclosed	
3 February 2026	GK	(Canada)	Lysianne Proulx	(Italy) Juventus	Undisclosed	

=== Out ===
Date	Pos	Nationality	Player	To	Fee	Ref
First team
4 June 2025	CF	(England)	Liam Delap	(England) Chelsea	£30,000,000	
24 July 2025	CM	(Egypt)	Sam Morsy	Al-Kuwait	Free transfer	
14 August 2025	LW	(Wales)	Nathan Broadhead	(Wales) Wrexham	£7,500,000	
16 August 2025	RW	(England)	Omari Hutchinson	(England) Nottingham Forest	£37,500,000	
1 September 2025	CB	(England)	Luke Woolfenden	(England) Coventry City	£4,000,000	
Academy
25 February 2026	CF	(Montserrat)	Ashley Boatswain	(England) Gateshead	Undisclosed	

=== Loaned in ===
Date	Pos	Nationality	Player	Loaned from	Date until	Ref
First team
13 July 2025	CB	(Ivory Coast)	Cédric Kipré	(France) Reims	31 May 2026	
7 August 2025	CM	(Sweden)	Jens Cajuste	(Italy) Napoli	31 May 2026	
10 August 2025	CF	(England)	Chuba Akpom	(Netherlands) Ajax	31 May 2026	
28 August 2025	CF	(Spain)	Iván Azón	(Italy) Como	31 May 2026	
27 January 2026	CM	(England)	Dan Neil	(England) Sunderland	31 May 2026	
Academy
1 September 2025	CF	(England)	Luca Fletcher	(England) Manchester City	31 May 2026	
2 February 2026	RW	(England)	Frankie Runham	(England) Chelsea	31 May 2026	
Women's team
4 September 2025	CM	(England)	Maddy Earl	(England) Arsenal	3 February 2026 (Note: On 3 February, Earl returned to Arsenal)	
22 January 2026	CF	(England)	Kit Graham	(England) Tottenham Hotspur	31 May 2026	
27 January 2026	CB	(Scotland)	Kenzie Weir	(England) Everton	31 May 2026	
29 January 2026	W	(England)	Ava Baker	(England) Birmingham City	31 May 2026	
3 February 2026	RB	(England)	Nelly Las	(England) Leicester City	31 May 2026	
3 February 2026	CM	(Tanzania)	Malaika Meena	(England) Bristol City	31 May 2026	
3 February 2026	CF	(England)	Princess Ademiluyi	(United States) Gotham FC	31 December 2026	

=== Loaned out ===
Date	Pos	Nationality	Player	Loaned to	Date until	Ref
First team
7 August 2025	GK	(Scotland)	Cieran Slicker	(England) Barnet	31 May 2026	
13 August 2025	GK	(Kosovo)	Arijanet Muric	(Italy) Sassuolo	31 May 2026	
1 September 2025	RW	(Republic of Ireland)	Chiedozie Ogbene	(England) Sheffield United	31 May 2026	
1 September 2025	CF	(Iraq)	Ali Al-Hamadi	(England) Luton Town	31 May 2026	
1 September 2025	SS	(England)	Conor Chaplin	(England) Portsmouth	31 May 2026	
8 January 2026	CM	(England)	Cameron Humphreys	(England) Huddersfield Town	31 May 2026	
12 January 2026	RB	(England)	Harry Clarke	(England) Charlton Athletic	31 May 2026	
2 February 2026	SS	(Republic of Ireland)	Sammie Szmodics	(England) Derby County	31 May 2026	
Academy
30 July 2025	DF	(Lithuania)	Jokūbas Mažionis	(England) Cheltenham Town	2 January 2026 (Note: On 2 January, Mažionis was recalled)	
1 September 2025	MF	(England)	Finley Barbrook	(England) Lincoln City	6 January 2026 (Note: On 6 January, Barbrook was recalled)	
1 September 2025	FW	(England)	Tom Taylor	(England) Cheltenham Town	12 January 2026 (Note: On 12 January, Taylor was recalled)	
9 October 2025	FW	(Montserrat)	Ashley Boatswain	(England) Woking	6 February 2026 (Note: On 6 February, Boatswain was recalled)	
4 November 2025	MF	(England)	Steven Turner	(England) Wealdstone	1 January 2026	
12 January 2026	GK	(New Zealand)	Henry Gray	(England) Harrogate Town	31 May 2026	
30 January 2026	MF	(England)	Finley Barbrook	(England) Colchester United	31 May 2026	
13 February 2026	FW	(Republic of Ireland)	Leon Ayinde	(England) Boreham Wood	31 May 2026	
Women's team
6 September 2025	GK	(Philippines)	Nina Meollo	(England) Real Bedford	31 May 2026	
28 January 2026	CM	(England)	Kaci-Jai Bonwick	(England) AFC Sudbury	31 May 2026	
31 January 2026	W	(England)	Ruby Seaby	(England) Lewes	31 May 2026	
5 February 2026	CM	(England)	Shauna Guyatt	(England) Sheffield United	31 May 2026	

Academy loans only shows players gone to a National League N/S team or higher and for more than a month

=== Released / out of contract ===
Date	Pos	Nationality	Player	Subsequent club	Join date	Ref
First team
30 June 2025	CB	(Australia)	Cameron Burgess	(England) Swansea City	1 July 2025	
30 June 2025	RB	(Democratic Republic of the Congo)	Axel Tuanzebe	(England) Burnley	1 July 2025	
30 June 2025	CM	(Australia)	Massimo Luongo	(England) Millwall	24 July 2025	
30 June 2025	LW	(Republic of Ireland)	Marcus Harness	(England) Huddersfield Town	1 July 2025	
Academy
30 June 2025	GK	(England)	Charlie Binns	(England) Bath City	8 October 2025	
30 June 2025	GK	(Poland)	Alan Fleischer	(England) Heybridge Swifts	1 July 2025	
30 June 2025	DF	(Republic of Ireland)	Edwin Agbaje	(Republic of Ireland) Sligo Rovers	15 August 2025	
30 June 2025	DF	(England)	Jesse Ayoola	(England) Hashtag United	7 January 2026	
30 June 2025	DF	(England)	Harry Barbrook	(England) Chelmsford City	1 July 2025	
30 June 2025	DF	(England)	George Chenery	(England) Brantham Athletic	August 2025	
30 June 2025	DF	(England)	Henry Curtis	(England) Burgess Hill Town	August 2025	
30 June 2025	DF	(England)	Callum Frith	(England) Dartford	4 February 2026	
30 June 2025	DF	(England)	Ayyuba Jambang	(England) Wingate & Finchley	23 September 2025	
30 June 2025	DF	(Republic of Ireland)	Daniel O'Connor	(Republic of Ireland) Kerry	3 September 2025	
30 June 2025	MF	(Albania)	Revin Domi	(England) Milton Keynes Dons	29 August 2025	
30 June 2025	MF	(England)	George Iorpenda	(England) Huddersfield Town	8 August 2025	
30 June 2025	MF	(England)	Emmanuel Okunowo	(England) Braintree Town	28 February 2026	
30 June 2025	MF	(England)	Noah Rastrick	(United States) Robert Morris Colonials	18 June 2025	
30 June 2025	MF	(Wales)	Mathaeus Roberts	(England) Stevenage	23 July 2025	
30 June 2025	MF	(England)	Luke Towler	(England) Norwich City	11 July 2025	
30 June 2025	FW	(England)	Olly Davis	(England) Braintree Town	19 September 2025	
30 June 2025	FW	(England)	Chuks Uzor-Greey	(England) Athletic Newham	1 July 2025	
Women's team
30 June 2025	LB	(England)	Maisy Barker	(England) Oxford United	2 July 2025	
30 June 2025	CB	(England)	Grace Garrad	(England) Watford	19 July 2025	
30 June 2025	CB	(England)	Evie Williams	(England) Norwich City	7 July 2025	
30 June 2025	W	(England)	Angela Addison	(England) Durham	7 July 2025	
30 June 2025	W	(England)	Issy Bryant	(England) Real Bedford	25 July 2025	
30 June 2025	SS	(England)	Ella Rutherford	(England) Portsmouth	13 August 2025	

=== New contracts ===
Date signed	Number	Pos	Nationality	Player	Contract length	Expiry	Ref
First team
24 June 2025	26	CB	(Republic of Ireland)	Dara O'Shea	5 years	30 June 2030	
4 July 2025	9	CF	(Scotland)	George Hirst	4 years	30 June 2029	
22 August 2025	25	CB	(Indonesia)	Elkan Baggott	2 years	30 June 2028	
10 October 2025	14	CM	(Republic of Ireland)	Jack Taylor	3 years	30 June 2028	
21 November 2025	3	LB	(England)	Leif Davis	4 years	30 June 2029	
28 January 2026	28	GK	(England)	Christian Walton	2 years	30 June 2028	
Academy
10 June 2025	–	FW	(England)	Jamie Mauge	2 years	30 June 2027	
23 June 2025	–	DF	(England)	Fraser Heard	Unknown length		
24 June 2025	–	FW	(Republic of Ireland)	Afikunoluwa Adebayo	Unknown length		
30 June 2025	–	DF	(England)	Josh Lewis	Unknown length		
Women's team
22 July 2025	When the club announced the releases they also offered 14 contracts which were all announced as confirmed on the same day. These contracts went to Natalia Negri, Maria Boswell, Summer Hughes, Charlotte Fleming, Leah Mitchell, Natasha Thomas, Kyra Robertson, Lucy O’Brien, Nina Meollo, Sophie Peskett, Megan Wearing, Shauna Guyatt, Kaci-Jai Bonwick and Laura Hartley						

== Pre-season and friendlies ==
On 6 June, Ipswich announced their first pre-season friendly of the 2025–26 campaign, taking on Bundesliga side FC Blau-Weiß Linz at the Hofmann Personal Stadion. This friendly will form part of Town's training camp during their stay in Austria. On 17 June, Town confirmed their next two pre-season friendly for the new campaign. The first being when they travel to the Pittodrie Stadium to take on Scottish Premiership side Aberdeen and the second when they take on Ligue 1 side AJ Auxerre at the Stade de l'Abbé-Deschamps. On 27 June, Town announced their fourth friendly which sees them taking on fellow Championship side Charlton Athletic at the Colchester Community Stadium.

Win Draw Loss Fixtures

19 July 2025 Friendly	FC Blau-Weiß Linz	1–4	Ipswich Town	Linz, Austria
18:00 CEST (17:00 BST)	Ronivaldo 45+1'	Report	Hirst 15' (pen.), 30'; O'Shea (yellow card) 45+2'; Al-Hamadi 52'; Davis 64'	Stadium: Hofmann Personal Stadion; Attendance: 2,900

25 July 2025 Friendly	Aberdeen	1–3	Ipswich Town	Aberdeen, Scotland
19:30 BST	Ambrose 80'	Report	Philogene 28', 59'; Hirst 39'	Stadium: Pittodrie Stadium; Attendance: 12,694; Referee: Dan McFarlane

29 July 2025 Friendly	Ipswich Town	2–1	Charlton Athletic	Colchester
19:45 BST	J. Clarke 51'; Al-Hamadi 58'	Report	Olaofe 55'	Stadium: Colchester Community Stadium; Referee: Alex Chilowicz

2 August 2025 Friendly	AJ Auxerre	0–3	Ipswich Town	Auxerre, France
18:00 CEST (17:00 BST)	Owusu (yellow card) 45+1'	Report	Hirst 38'; Greaves 45+1'; Al-Hamadi 85'; Barbrook (yellow card) 87'	Stadium: Stade de l'Abbé-Deschamps

== Competitions ==
=== Overall record ===
Competition	First match	Last match	Starting round	Final position	Record							
Competition	First match	Last match	Starting round	Final position	Pld	W	D	L	GF	GA	GD	Win %
Championship	8 August 2025	2 May 2026	Matchday 1	2nd	46	23	15	8	80	47	+33	50.00
FA Cup	10 January 2026	13 February 2026	Third round	Fourth round	2	1	0	1	2	2	+0	50.00
EFL Cup	12 August 2025	12 August 2025	First round	First round	1	0	1	0	1	1	+0	0.00
Total					49	24	16	9	83	50	+33	48.98

Last updated: 2 May 2026
Source: Soccerway

=== Championship ===
==== League table ====
Pos	Team	Pld	W	D	L	GF	GA	GD	Pts	Promotion, qualification or relegation
1	Coventry City (C, P)	46	28	11	7	97	45	+52	95	Promotion to the Premier League
2	Ipswich Town (P)	46	23	15	8	80	47	+33	84	Promotion to the Premier League
3	Millwall	46	24	11	11	64	49	+15	83	Qualification for the Championship play-offs
4	Southampton (Note: Southampton qualified for the play-offs and defeated Middlesbrough to qualify for the final, but were subsequently disqualified for multiple breaches of EFL regulations related to the unauthorised filming of other clubs' training, with Middlesbrough taking their place in the play-off final.) (D)	46	22	14	10	82	56	+26	80	Qualification for the Championship play-offs
5	Middlesbrough	46	22	14	10	72	47	+25	80	Qualification for the Championship play-offs

Source: EFL Official Website
Rules for classification: 1) Points; 2) Goal difference; 3) Number of goals scored; 4) Head-to-head results; 5) Wins; 6) Away goals; 7) Penalty points (sec 9.5); 8) Number of 12-point sending off offences; 9) Play-off (only if needed to determine promotion/relegation)
(C) Champions; (D) Disqualified; (P) Promoted

==== Results summary ====
Overall								Home						Away					
Pld	W	D	L	GF	GA	GD	Pts	W	D	L	GF	GA	GD	W	D	L	GF	GA	GD
46	23	15	8	80	47	+33	84	14	8	1	43	17	+26	9	7	7	37	30	+7

Last updated: 2 May 2026.
Source: Soccerway

==== Results by round ====
Round	1	2	3	4	5	7	8	9	10	11	12	13	14	15	16	17	18	6^{1}	19	20	21	22	23	24	25	27	28	29	30	31	33	34	35	32^{3}	36	37	38	39	41	42	26^{2}	43	44	45	40^{4}	46
Ground	A	H	A	H	H	H	A	H	A	H	H	A	H	A	H	A	A	A	H	H	A	H	A	A	H	H	H	A	H	A	A	A	H	H	H	A	A	H	H	A	A	H	A	A	A	H
Result	D	D	L	D	W	W	D	W	L	L	W	W	D	W	D	W	L	D	W	W	L	W	D	W	W	W	W	L	D	W	L	W	W	W	D	D	W	D	W	W	L	D	W	D	D	W
Position	10	17	18	20	14	12	13	9	12	14	12	9	10	7	8	5	9	7	4	4	5	3	3	3	2	3	3	3	4	3	4	4	4	3	4	4	3	3	2	2	2	2	2	2	2	2
Points	1	2	2	3	6	9	10	13	13	13	16	19	20	23	24	27	27	28	31	34	34	37	38	41	44	47	50	50	51	54	54	57	60	63	64	65	68	69	72	75	75	76	79	80	81	84

Updated to match(es) played on 2 May 2026. Source:
A = Away; H = Home; W = Win; D = Draw; L = Loss
Notes:
- ^{1} Matchday 6 (vs Blackburn Rovers) was abandoned due to a waterlogged pitch.
- ^{2} Matchday 26 (vs Portsmouth) was postponed due to a frozen pitch and then again due to a waterlogged pitch.
- ^{3} Matchday 32 (vs Hull CIty) was re-arranged due to the FA Cup fourth round.
- ^{4} Matchday 40 (vs Southampton) was re-arranged due to Southampton's FA Cup quarter-final involvements.

==== Matches ====
The league fixtures were released on 26 June 2025.

Win Draw Loss Fixtures

8 August 2025 1	Birmingham City	1–1	Ipswich Town	Birmingham
20:00 BST	Osayi-Samuel (yellow card) 19'; Stansfield 55'; Paik Seung-ho (yellow card) 71'	Report	Taylor (yellow card) 19'; Matusiwa (yellow card) 44'; Hirst 90+5' (pen.); Chaplin (yellow card) 90+6'	Stadium: St Andrew's; Attendance: 27,508; Referee: Andrew Kitchen
Note: Live on Sky Sports

17 August 2025 2	Ipswich Town	1–1	Southampton	Ipswich
12:00 BST	Harwood-Bellis 4' (o.g.); Taylor (yellow card) 42'; Matusiwa (yellow card) 45+2'	Report	Robinson 29'; Welington (yellow card) 41'; Osayi-Samuel (yellow card) 90+5'	Stadium: Portman Road; Attendance: 29,128; Referee: Bobby Madley
Note: Fixture was initially scheduled for 16 August, but was moved for live Sky Sports broadcast.

23 August 2025 3	Preston North End	1–0	Ipswich Town	Preston
15:00 BST	Osmajic 11' (pen.), (yellow card) 82'; Hughes (yellow card) 26'; Valentín (yellow card) 45+1'; Small (yellow card) 84'; Þórðarson (yellow card) 90+2'; McCann (yellow card) 90+5'	Report	Johnson (yellow card) 40'; McAteer (yellow card) 84'	Stadium: Deepdale; Attendance: 18,381; Referee: Matt Donohue

30 August 2025 4	Ipswich Town	2–2	Derby County	Ipswich
15:00 BST	Greaves 33'; McAteer (yellow card) 40'; Hirst (yellow card) 54'; J. Clarke 90+16' (pen.)	Report	Elder (yellow card) 35'; Morris 50' (pen.), (yellow card) 90+15'; Adams (yellow card) 55'; Travis (yellow card) 67'; Brewster 70'; Clark (yellow card) 75'; Sanderson (yellow card) 85'; Ozoh (yellow card) 90+14'	Stadium: Portman Road; Attendance: 29,155; Referee: Leigh Doughty

12 September 2025 5	Ipswich Town	5–0	Sheffield United	Ipswich
20:00 BST	Philogene 20', 51', 68'; Hirst 61'; J. Clarke 78'	Report	McGuinness (yellow card) 54'; Tanganga (yellow card) 90'	Stadium: Portman Road; Attendance: 28,012; Referee: Farai Hallam
Note: Fixture was initially scheduled for 13 September, but was moved for live Sky Sports broadcast.

27 September 2025 7	Ipswich Town	2–1	Portsmouth	Ipswich
15:00 BST	Philogene 9'; Hirst 41'; Walle Egeli (yellow card) 90'	Report	Dozzell (yellow card) 7'; Le Roux (yellow card) 33'; Pack 90+2'	Stadium: Portman Road; Attendance: 29,141; Referee: Andrew Kitchen

30 September 2025 8	Bristol City	1–1	Ipswich Town	Bristol
19:45 BST	Atkinson 18'; McCrorie (yellow card) 45+1'; Mehmeti (yellow card) 45+5'; Vyner (yellow card) 90+3'; Armstrong (yellow card) 90+7'	Report	J. Clarke 52' (pen.); Matusiwa (yellow card) 54'; Davis (yellow card) 65'	Stadium: Ashton Gate; Attendance: 23,329; Referee: John Busby

5 October 2025 9	Ipswich Town	3–1	Norwich City	Ipswich
12:00 BST	Kipré 32'; Philogene 44', (yellow card) 73'; J. Clarke 77'	Report	Schwartau 35'; Darling (yellow card) 38'; McLean (yellow card) 73'; Mattsson (yellow card) 81'	Stadium: Portman Road; Attendance: 29,809; Referee: Thomas Kirk
Note: Fixture was initially scheduled for 4 October, but was moved for live Sky Sports broadcast.

17 October 2025 10	Middlesbrough	2–1	Ipswich Town	Middlesbrough
20:00 BST	Jones (yellow card) 20'; Brittain (yellow card) 42'; Kipré 45+2' (o.g.); Whittaker 55'; Sène (yellow card) 83'	Report	O'Shea 76'; Matusiwa (yellow card) 81'	Stadium: Riverside Stadium; Attendance: 27,805; Referee: Matt Donohue
Note: Fixture was initially scheduled for 18 October, but was moved for live Sky Sports broadcast.

21 October 2025 11	Ipswich Town	0–3	Charlton Athletic	Ipswich
19:45 BST		Report	Docherty (yellow card) 45+3'; Carey 52'; Gillesphey 55'; Leaburn 64'; Ramsay (yellow card) 78'; Knibbs (yellow card) 88'	Stadium: Portman Road; Attendance: 28,006; Referee: Farai Hallam

25 October 2025 12	Ipswich Town	1–0	West Bromwich Albion	Ipswich
12:30 BST	Hirst (yellow card) 75'; J. Clarke 83'	Report	Mepham (yellow card) 78'	Stadium: Portman Road; Attendance: 28,447; Referee: Josh Smith
Note: Kick-off was brought forward for live Sky Sports broadcast.

1 November 2025 13	Queens Park Rangers	1–4	Ipswich Town	Shepherd's Bush
15:00 GMT	Burrell 21'; Vale (yellow card) 32'; Morrison (yellow card) 63'; Mbengue (yellow card) 90'; Hayden (yellow card) 90+4'	Report	Hirst 2', 57'; Núñez 47', 64'	Stadium: Loftus Road; Attendance: 17,505; Referee: Sam Allison

4 November 2025 14	Ipswich Town	1–1	Watford	Ipswich
19:45 GMT	Philogene 21'; Hirst (yellow card) 55'	Report	Louza 16'; Baah (yellow card) 45+1'; Bola (yellow card) 59'	Stadium: Portman Road; Attendance: 27,184; Referee: David Webb

8 November 2025 15	Swansea City	1–4	Ipswich Town	Swansea
15:00 GMT	Tymon (yellow card) 26'; Inoussa (yellow card) 30'; Galbraith (yellow card) 33'; Samuels-Smith (yellow card) 34'; Franco 50'; Cabango (yellow card) 71'	Report	Núñez (yellow card) 24'; J. Clarke 36'; Burgess 55', 81' (o.g.); Taylor (yellow card) 70'; Azón 76'; Matusiwa (yellow card) 80'	Stadium: Swansea.com Stadium; Attendance: 16,783; Referee: Edward Duckworth

22 November 2025 16	Ipswich Town	0–0	Wrexham	Ipswich
15:00 GMT	Kipré (yellow card) 51'; Matusiwa (yellow card) 64'	Report	Thomason (yellow card) 37'; Sheaf (yellow card) 48'; O'Brien (yellow card) 87'	Stadium: Portman Road; Attendance: 29,147; Referee: Dean Whitestone

25 November 2025 17	Hull City	0–2	Ipswich Town	Kingston upon Hull
19:45 GMT	Gelhardt (yellow card) 31'; Giles (yellow card) 52'	Report	Cajuste (yellow card) 22'; Núñez 69'; Akpom 73'; Greaves (yellow card) 89'	Stadium: MKM Stadium; Attendance: 21,271; Referee: Lewis Smith

28 November 2025 18	Oxford United	2–1	Ipswich Town	Oxford
20:00 GMT	M. Harris 24'; Płacheta 77'	Report	Davis 53'	Stadium: Kassam Stadium; Attendance: 11,307; Referee: Matt Donohue
Note: Fixture was initially scheduled for 29 November, but was moved for live Sky Sports broadcast.

2 December 2025 6	Blackburn Rovers	1–1	Ipswich Town	Blackburn
19:45 GMT	Gardner-Hickman (yellow card) 50'; Guðjohnsen 76'	Report	Kipré (yellow card) 26'; Matusiwa (yellow card) 45'; Davis (yellow card) 49'; Walle Egeli 90+4'	Stadium: Ewood Park; Attendance: 13,142; Referee: Oliver Langford
Note: Fixture was initially scheduled for 20 September, but was abandoned in the 80th minute due to a waterlogged pitch.

6 December 2025 19	Ipswich Town	3–0	Coventry City	Ipswich
15:00 GMT	Hirst (yellow card) 15', (goal) 60'; Walle Egeli 43', (yellow card) 56'; Walton (yellow card) 53'; Kipré (yellow card) 57'; Furlong (yellow card) 86'; Azón 90+5'	Report	Eccles (yellow card) 17'; Grimes (yellow card) 40'	Stadium: Portman Road; Attendance: 29,025; Referee: Paul Tierney

10 December 2025 20	Ipswich Town	1–0	Stoke City	Ipswich
19:45 GMT	Philogene 2'; Matusiwa (yellow card) 79'	Report	Talovierov (yellow card) 89'	Stadium: Portman Road; Attendance: 27,008; Referee: Adam Herczeg

13 December 2025 21	Leicester City	3–1	Ipswich Town	Leicester
15:00 GMT	Cordova-Reid 8'; Fatawu 43'; Ayew 52'; Thomas (yellow card) 90+4'	Report	Taylor (yellow card) 31'; Cajuste 71'; J. Clarke (yellow card) 90+2'	Stadium: King Power Stadium; Attendance: 28,948; Referee: Thomas Kirk

20 December 2025 22	Ipswich Town	3–1	Sheffield Wednesday	Ipswich
15:00 GMT	Kipré 33'; Philogene 60'; Furlong (yellow card) 78'; J. Clarke 87'	Report	Cooper (yellow card) 49', (goal) 71'	Stadium: Portman Road; Attendance: 28,680; Referee: David Webb

26 December 2025 23	Millwall	0–0	Ipswich Town	Bermondsey
13:00 GMT	Leonard (yellow card) 90'	Report	Philogene (yellow card) 49'; Furlong (yellow card) 83'	Stadium: The Den; Attendance: 18,843; Referee: Tim Robinson
Note: Kick-off was brought forward for live Sky Sports broadcast.

29 December 2025 24	Coventry City	0–2	Ipswich Town	Coventry
18:00 GMT	Kitching (yellow card) 18'	Report	Taylor (yellow card) 63'; J. Clarke 72'; Burns 83'; Furlong (yellow card) 88'	Stadium: Coventry Building Society Arena; Attendance: 31,213; Referee: Anthony Backhouse
Note: Kick-off was brought forward for live Sky Sports broadcast.

1 January 2026 25	Ipswich Town	2–1	Oxford United	Ipswich
15:00 GMT	Philogene 17'; Akpom 40', (yellow card) 56'	Report	Dembélé (yellow card) 27'; Lankshear 34'; Brown (yellow card) 56'; Helik (yellow card) 61'; Vaulks (yellow card) 75'	Stadium: Portman Road; Attendance: 28,199; Referee: Will Finnie

17 January 2026 27	Ipswich Town	3–0	Blackburn Rovers	Ipswich
12:30 GMT	Cashin 3' (o.g.); Taylor 12'; Szmodics 88'	Report	Atcheson (yellow card) 25'; Tronstad (yellow card) 69'; Cantwell (yellow card) 81'; Cashin (yellow card) 86'	Stadium: Portman Road; Attendance: 26,715; Referee: Andrew Kitchen
Note: Fixture was initially scheduled for a 15:00 kick-off, but was rescheduled for live Sky Sports broadcast.

20 January 2026 28	Ipswich Town	2–0	Bristol City	Ipswich
19:45 GMT	J. Clarke 8', 55'; Furlong (yellow card) 71'	Report	Borges (yellow card) 40'; Morsy (yellow card) 60'; Dickie (yellow card) 62'; Tanner (yellow card) 74'; Randell (yellow card) 87'; Armstrong (yellow card) 89'	Stadium: Portman Road; Attendance: 25,539; Referee: Dean Whitestone

24 January 2026 29	Sheffield United	3–1	Ipswich Town	Sheffield
15:00 GMT	O'Hare 38'; Brooks 45+4'; Bamford 66', (yellow card) 75' (yellow-red card) 84'	Report	Walton (yellow card) 39'; Furlong (yellow card) 45+4'; Kipré (yellow card) 48'; J. Clarke 60' (pen.); Greaves (yellow card) 76'	Stadium: Bramall Lane; Attendance: 28,638; Referee: Tom Nield

31 January 2026 30	Ipswich Town	1–1	Preston North End	Ipswich
15:00 GMT	J. Clarke (yellow card) 82', (goal) 90+2' (pen.)	Report	Thompson (yellow card) 33'; McCann (yellow card) 50'; Gibson 72'	Stadium: Portman Road; Attendance: 27,549; Referee: John Busby

7 February 2026 31	Derby County	1–2	Ipswich Town	Derby
12:30 GMT	Travis (yellow card) 13' (yellow-red card) 90+2'; Batth (yellow card) 58'; Brewster 68' (pen.)	Report	Travis 8' (o.g.); Taylor (yellow card) 30'; Mehmeti (yellow card) 33'; Davis 77'; McAteer (yellow card) 83'; Furlong (yellow card) 90+2'	Stadium: Pride Park Stadium; Attendance: 29,498; Referee: Josh Smith
Note: Fixture was initially scheduled for a 15:00 kick-off, but was rescheduled for live Sky Sports broadcast.

21 February 2026 33	Wrexham	5–3	Ipswich Town	Wrexham
15:00 GMT	Moore 6'; Cleworth (yellow card) 26'; Doyle (yellow card) 31', (goal) 75'; Windass 37'; Rathbone (yellow card) 60'; Hyam (yellow card) 64'; Thomason 66'; Broadhead 86'; Dobson (yellow card) 88'	Report	Mehmeti 20'; Davis (yellow card) 37'; Kipré (yellow card) 41', (goal) 47'; Azón 45+3'; Furlong (yellow card) 45+4'; Burns (yellow card) 57'	Stadium: Racecourse Ground; Attendance: 10,610; Referee: Leigh Doughty

24 February 2026 34	Watford	0–2	Ipswich Town	Watford
19:45 GMT	Abankwah (yellow card) 25'; Irankunda (yellow card) 28'	Report	Walle Egeli 37'; Kipré (yellow card) 56'; Hirst 77'; Furlong (yellow card) 83'; Walton (yellow card) 85'	Stadium: Vicarage Road; Attendance: 18,249; Referee: Ben Toner

28 February 2026 35	Ipswich Town	3–0	Swansea City	Ipswich
15:00 GMT	Mehmeti 3', (yellow card) 39'; Azón 41'; Hirst 74'	Report		Stadium: Portman Road; Attendance: 27,594; Referee: Anthony Backhouse

3 March 2026 32	Ipswich Town	1–0	Hull City	Ipswich
19:45 GMT	Matusiwa 71'; Kipré (yellow card) 82'; Walton (yellow card) 90+4'	Report	Coyle (yellow card) 36'; Crooks (yellow card) 62'; Pandur (yellow card) 63'; Egan (yellow card) 70'	Stadium: Portman Road; Attendance: 26,103; Referee: Lewis Smith
Note: Fixture was initially scheduled for 14 February, but was postponed due to the 4th round FA Cup clash with Wrexham.

7 March 2026 36	Ipswich Town	1–1	Leicester City	Ipswich
15:00 GMT	Burns (yellow card) 34'; Núñez (yellow card) 58'; Walle Egeli 76'; Kipré (yellow card) 90+5'	Report	Thomas (yellow card) 19'; Daka 39'; Cordova-Reid (yellow card) 51'; James (yellow card) 90+5'	Stadium: Portman Road; Attendance: 28,709; Referee: John Busby

10 March 2026 37	Stoke City	3–3	Ipswich Town	Stoke-on-Trent
20:00 GMT	Smit 35', 90+6' (pen.); Bae Jun-ho 44'	Report	J. Clarke (yellow card) 42'; Bocat 49' (o.g.); Taylor (yellow card) 58', (goal) 64'; Hirst 82'; Mehmeti (yellow card) 90+2'; Kipré (yellow card) 90+5'	Stadium: Bet365 Stadium; Attendance: 22,330; Referee: Thomas Kirk
Note: Fixture was originally scheduled for a 19:45 kick-off, but was pushed back fifteen minutes for live Sky Sports broadcasting.

14 March 2026 38	Sheffield Wednesday	0–2	Ipswich Town	Sheffield
15:00 GMT	Thornton (yellow card) 50'; Fusire (yellow card) 54'; Adaramola (yellow card) 57'	Report	Burns (yellow card) 57'; Azón 78'; J. Clarke 83' (pen.)	Stadium: Hillsborough Stadium; Attendance: 23,437; Referee: Tom Reeves

21 March 2026 39	Ipswich Town	1–1	Millwall	Ipswich
12:30 GMT	J. Clarke 41'; Azón (yellow card) 53'	Report	Coburn (yellow card) 16', (goal) 50'; Mazou-Sacko (yellow card) 86'	Stadium: Portman Road; Attendance: 29,129; Referee: Michael Salisbury
Note: Fixture was initially scheduled for a 15:00 kick-off, but brought forward for Sky Sports and ITV Sport broadcasting.

6 April 2026 41	Ipswich Town	2–1	Birmingham City	Ipswich
15:00 BST	Johnson 41'; McAteer 45'; Taylor (yellow card) 76'	Report	Vicente 32'; Gray (yellow card) 38'	Stadium: Portman Road; Attendance: 29,381; Referee: Adam Herczeg

11 April 2026 42	Norwich City	0–2	Ipswich Town	Norwich
12:30 BST	Kvistgaarden (yellow card) 21'; Stacey (yellow card) 32'; McLean (yellow card) 60'; Darling (yellow card) 69'; Córdoba (yellow card) 76'	Report	Philogene 11' (pen.); Mehmeti (yellow card) 13'; Greaves (yellow card) 19'; Hirst (yellow card) 26', (goal) 45+1'; Núñez (yellow card) 69'; Davis (yellow card) 74'	Stadium: Carrow Road; Attendance: 26,826; Referee: Anthony Backhouse
Note: Fixture was initially scheduled for a 15:00 kick-off, but was rescheduled following conversations between the English Football League and local authorities.

14 April 2026 26	Portsmouth	2–0	Ipswich Town	Portsmouth
20:00 BST	Pack (yellow card) 35'; Shaughnessy 42'; Bishop 44'; Devlin (yellow card) 82'	Report	Núñez (yellow card) 81'; Philogene (yellow card) 90+1'	Stadium: Fratton Park; Attendance: 20,251; Referee: Farai Hallam
Note: Fixture was initially scheduled for 4 January, but was postponed due to a frozen pitch. It was again postponed on 3 February due to a waterlogged pitch.

19 April 2026 43	Ipswich Town	2–2	Middlesbrough	Ipswich
12:00 BST	McAteer 30'; J. Clarke 87' (pen.); Neil (yellow card) 90+1'; Furlong (yellow card) 90+3'	Report	Strelec 25'; Targett (yellow card) 52'; Conway 64'; Malanda (yellow card) 86'; Brittain (yellow card) 90+4'; Sarmiento (yellow card) 90+8'	Stadium: Portman Road; Attendance: 29,684; Referee: Jarred Gillett
Note: Fixture was initially scheduled for 18 April, but was moved to the following day for Sky Sports broadcasting.

22 April 2026 44	Charlton Athletic	1–2	Ipswich Town	Charlton
19:45 BST	Docherty 1'; Gillesphey (yellow card) 37'; Dykes (yellow card) 61'	Report	Furlong 36'; Philogene 58' (pen.); Taylor (yellow card) 65'; J. Clarke (yellow card) 90+8'	Stadium: The Valley; Attendance: 19,706; Referee: Bobby Madley

25 April 2026 45	West Bromwich Albion	0–0	Ipswich Town	West Bromwich
12:30 BST	Dike (yellow card) 58'; Campbell (yellow card) 79'	Report	Kipré (yellow card) 27'; Matusiwa (yellow card) 57'; Greaves (yellow card) 90+4'	Stadium: The Hawthorns; Attendance: 25,318; Referee: Matt Donohue
Note: Fixture was initially scheduled for a 15:00 kick-off, but was brought forward for live Sky Sports broadcasting.

28 April 2026 40	Southampton	2–2	Ipswich Town	Southampton
19:45 BST	Manning 58'; Larin 80'	Report	Burns 48'; Greaves (yellow card) 57'; Azón (yellow card) 75'; J. Clarke 87'	Stadium: St Mary's Stadium; Attendance: 31,180; Referee: Thomas Kirk
Note: Fixture was initially scheduled for 3 April, but was rearranged due to Southampton's FA Cup quarter-final involvements.

2 May 2026 46	Ipswich Town	3–0	Queens Park Rangers	Ipswich
12:30 BST	Hirst 3'; Philogene 9'; Furlong (yellow card) 46'; Davis (yellow card) 76'; McAteer 85'	Report	Amyth (yellow card) 79'	Stadium: Portman Road; Attendance: 29,636; Referee: Gavin Ward

=== FA Cup ===
As a Championship side, Ipswich entered the FA Cup in the third round and were drawn at home to Blackpool. Then away to Wrexham in the fourth round.

Win Draw Loss Fixtures

10 January 2026 Third round	Ipswich Town	2–1	Blackpool	Ipswich
15:00 GMT	Young (yellow card) 23'; Philogene 35'; Burns (yellow card) 35'; Greaves 87'	Report	Lyons (yellow card) 47'; Imray (yellow card) 86'; Fletcher 90+6' (pen.)	Stadium: Portman Road; Attendance: 27,527; Referee: Thomas Parsons

13 February 2026 Fourth round	Wrexham	1–0	Ipswich Town	Wrexham
19:45 GMT	Windass 34'	Report	Egeli (yellow card) 83'	Stadium: Racecourse Ground; Attendance: 10,496; Referee: Ben Speedie

=== EFL Cup ===
As a recently relegated Premier League club, Ipswich would have normally entered in the second round. Due to the number of Premier League clubs taking part in Europe, the draw was made different this year with a preliminary round added for 4 clubs and Town now entering in the first round. On 26 June 2025, the first round draw was made with Ipswich being drawn away to Bromley.

Win Draw Loss

12 August 2025 First round	Bromley	1–1 (5–4 p)	Ipswich Town	Bromley
20:00 BST	Elerewe 45'; Pinnock (yellow card) 60'	Report	Johnson 53'	Stadium: Hayes Lane; Attendance: 3,005; Referee: Michael Russell
	Penalties
	Cheek (penalty scored); Charles (penalty missed); Arthurs (penalty scored); Odutayo (penalty scored); Pinnock (penalty scored); Ifill (penalty scored)		(penalty missed) Hirst; (penalty scored) Szmodics; (penalty scored) Johnson; (penalty scored) Young; (penalty scored) Chaplin; (penalty missed) Al-Hamadi

== Statistics ==
=== Appearances and goals ===
As of match played 2 May 2026

Players with no appearances are not included on the list

No.	Pos	Nat	Player	Total		Championship		FA Cup		EFL Cup	
No.	Pos	Nat	Player	Apps	Goals	Apps	Goals	Apps	Goals	Apps	Goals
1	GK	(England) ENG	Alex Palmer	12	0	10	0	2	0	0	0
3	DF	(England) ENG	Leif Davis	38	2	35+2	2	0	0	1	0
4	DF	(Ivory Coast) CIV	Cédric Kipré	35	3	29+3	3	2	0	1	0
5	MF	(Netherlands) NED	Azor Matusiwa	46	1	45	1	1	0	0	0
6	MF	(England) ENG	Dan Neil	17	0	8+8	0	1	0	0	0
7	MF	(Wales) WAL	Wes Burns	19	2	9+9	2	1	0	0	0
8	FW	(Norway) NOR	Sindre Walle Egeli	30	4	18+10	4	1+1	0	0	0
9	FW	(Scotland) SCO	George Hirst	42	11	25+15	11	1	0	0+1	0
11	FW	(England) ENG	Jaden Philogene	35	13	23+11	12	1	1	0	0
12	MF	(Sweden) SWE	Jens Cajuste	31	1	13+17	1	1	0	0	0
14	MF	(Republic of Ireland) IRL	Jack Taylor	42	2	24+15	2	1+1	0	0+1	0
15	DF	(England) ENG	Ashley Young	15	0	3+10	0	1	0	1	0
18	DF	(England) ENG	Ben Johnson	20	2	9+8	1	2	0	0+1	1
19	DF	(England) ENG	Darnell Furlong	40	1	40	1	0	0	0	0
20	FW	(Republic of Ireland) IRL	Kasey McAteer	30	3	14+14	3	1+1	0	0	0
24	DF	(England) ENG	Jacob Greaves	27	2	23+1	1	2	1	0+1	0
25	DF	(Indonesia) IDN	Elkan Baggott	2	0	0	0	1+1	0	0	0
26	DF	(Republic of Ireland) IRL	Dara O'Shea	47	1	46	1	0+1	0	0	0
28	GK	(England) ENG	Christian Walton	38	0	36+1	0	0	0	1	0
29	FW	(England) ENG	Chuba Akpom	31	2	7+22	2	2	0	0	0
31	FW	(Spain) ESP	Iván Azón	40	5	20+18	5	0+2	0	0	0
32	MF	(Chile) CHI	Marcelino Núñez	36	3	24+12	3	0	0	0	0
33	FW	(Albania) ALB	Anis Mehmeti	19	2	11+7	2	0+1	0	0	0
47	FW	(England) ENG	Jack Clarke	48	16	23+22	16	1+1	0	1	0
Player(s) who featured but departed the club permanently during the season:
6	DF	(England) ENG	Luke Woolfenden	1	0	0	0	0	0	1	0
33	FW	(Wales) WAL	Nathan Broadhead	1	0	0+1	0	0	0	0	0
Player(s) who featured but currently out on loan:
10	FW	(England) ENG	Conor Chaplin	5	0	1+3	0	0	0	1	0
16	FW	(Iraq) IRQ	Ali Al-Hamadi	2	0	0+1	0	0	0	1	0
21	FW	(Republic of Ireland) IRL	Chiedozie Ogbene	3	0	1+1	0	0	0	1	0
23	FW	(Republic of Ireland) IRL	Sammie Szmodics	18	1	8+8	1	0+1	0	0+1	0
30	MF	(England) ENG	Cameron Humphreys	4	0	0+3	0	0	0	1	0
35	MF	(England) ENG	Fin Barbrook	1	0	0	0	0	0	1	0

=== Goalscorers ===
As of match played 2 May 2026

Rank	No.	Pos.	Nat.	Player	Championship	FA Cup	EFL Cup	Total
1	47	FW	(England)	Jack Clarke	16	0	0	16
2	12	FW	(England)	Jaden Philogene	11	1	0	13
3	9	FW	(Scotland)	George Hirst	11	0	0	11
4	31	FW	(Spain)	Iván Azón	5	0	0	5
5	8	FW	(Norway)	Sindre Walle Egeli	4	0	0	4
6	32	MF	(Chile)	Marcelino Núñez	3	0	0	3
6	4	DF	(Ivory Coast)	Cédric Kipré	3	0	0	3
6	20	FW	(Republic of Ireland)	Kasey McAteer	3	0	0	3
9	29	FW	(England)	Chuba Akpom	2	0	0	2
9	24	DF	(England)	Jacob Greaves	1	1	0	2
9	3	DF	(England)	Leif Davis	2	0	0	2
9	33	FW	(Albania)	Anis Mehmeti	2	0	0	2
9	14	MF	(Republic of Ireland)	Jack Taylor	2	0	0	2
9	18	DF	(England)	Ben Johnson	1	0	1	2
9	7	MF	(Wales)	Wes Burns	2	0	0	2
16	26	DF	(Republic of Ireland)	Dara O'Shea	1	0	0	1
16	12	MF	(Sweden)	Jens Cajuste	1	0	0	1
16	23	FW	(Republic of Ireland)	Sammie Szmodics	1	0	0	1
16	5	MF	(Netherlands)	Azor Matusiwa	1	0	0	1
16	19	DF	(England)	Darnell Furlong	1	0	0	1
Own goals					6	0	0	6
Totals					80	2	1	83

=== Assists ===
As of match played 2 May 2026

Rank	No.	Pos.	Nat.	Player	Championship	FA Cup	EFL Cup	Total
1	32	MF	(Chile)	Marcelino Núñez	7	0	0	7
2	3	DF	(England)	Leif Davis	4	0	0	4
2	31	FW	(Spain)	Iván Azón	4	0	0	4
4	12	MF	(Sweden)	Jens Cajuste	3	0	0	3
4	19	DF	(England)	Darnell Furlong	3	0	0	3
4	5	MF	(Netherlands)	Azor Matusiwa	3	0	0	3
4	9	FW	(Scotland)	George Hirst	3	0	0	3
8	11	FW	(England)	Jaden Philogene	2	0	0	2
8	14	MF	(Republic of Ireland)	Jack Taylor	2	0	0	2
8	4	DF	(Ivory Coast)	Cédric Kipré	2	0	0	2
8	18	DF	(England)	Ben Johnson	1	1	0	2
8	24	DF	(England)	Jacob Greaves	2	0	0	2
13	8	FW	(Norway)	Sindre Walle Egeli	1	0	0	1
13	26	DF	(Republic of Ireland)	Dara O'Shea	1	0	0	1
13	47	FW	(England)	Jack Clarke	1	0	0	1
13	15	DF	(England)	Ashley Young	0	1	0	1
13	7	MF	(Wales)	Wes Burns	1	0	0	1
13	20	FW	(Republic of Ireland)	Kasey McAteer	1	0	0	1
13	33	FW	(Albania)	Anis Mehmeti	1	0	0	1
Totals					42	2	0	44

=== Clean sheets ===
As of match played 2 May 2026

Rank	No.	Nat.	Player	Championship	FA Cup	EFL Cup	Total
1	28	(England)	Christian Walton	16	0	0	16
2	1	(England)	Alex Palmer	1	0	0	1
Totals				17	0	0	17

=== Disciplinary record ===
As of match played 2 May 2026

No.	Pos.	Nat.	Player	Championship		FA Cup		EFL Cup		Total	
No.	Pos.	Nat.	Player	Yellow card	Red card	Yellow card	Red card	Yellow card	Red card	Yellow card	Red card
3	DF	(England)	Leif Davis	5	0	0	0	0	0	5	0
4	DF	(Ivory Coast)	Cédric Kipré	11	0	0	0	0	0	11	0
5	MF	(Netherlands)	Azor Matusiwa	10	0	0	0	0	0	10	0
6	MF	(England)	Dan Neil	1	0	0	0	0	0	1	0
7	MF	(Wales)	Wes Burns	3	0	1	0	0	0	4	0
8	FW	(Norway)	Sindre Walle Egeli	2	0	1	0	0	0	3	0
9	FW	(Scotland)	George Hirst	6	0	0	0	0	0	6	0
10	FW	(England)	Conor Chaplin	1	0	0	0	0	0	1	0
11	FW	(England)	Jaden Philogene	3	0	0	0	0	0	3	0
12	MF	(Sweden)	Jens Cajuste	2	0	0	0	0	0	2	0
14	MF	(Republic of Ireland)	Jack Taylor	9	0	0	0	0	0	9	0
18	DF	(England)	Ben Johnson	1	0	1	0	0	0	2	0
19	DF	(England)	Darnell Furlong	11	0	0	0	0	0	11	0
20	FW	(Republic of Ireland)	Kasey McAteer	3	0	0	0	0	0	3	0
24	DF	(England)	Jacob Greaves	5	1	0	0	0	0	5	1
28	GK	(England)	Christian Walton	4	0	0	0	0	0	4	0
29	FW	(England)	Chuba Akpom	1	0	0	0	0	0	1	0
31	FW	(Spain)	Iván Azón	2	0	0	0	0	0	2	0
32	MF	(Chile)	Marcelino Núñez	4	0	0	0	0	0	4	0
33	FW	(Albania)	Anis Mehmeti	4	0	0	0	0	0	4	0
47	FW	(England)	Jack Clarke	4	0	0	0	0	0	4	0
Totals				87	1	3	0	0	0	90	1

=== Captains ===
As of match played 2 May 2026

Rank	No.	Nat.	Player	Championship	FA Cup	EFL Cup	Total	Notes
1	26	(Republic of Ireland)	Dara O'Shea	46	0	0	46	Club captain
2	10	(England)	Conor Chaplin	0	0	1	1	
2	15	(England)	Ashley Young	0	1	0	1	
2	9	(Scotland)	George Hirst	0	1	0	1	

== Awards ==
=== End of year awards ===
Award	Player	Ref.
Player of the Year	(Netherlands) Azor Matusiwa	
Young Player of the Year	(England) Tudor Mendel-Idowu	
Women's Player of the Year	(England) Sophie Peskett	
Goal of the Season	(England) Jaden Philogene (vs Norwich City, 5 October 2025)	

=== Monthly awards ===
- EFL Championship Manager of the Month
  - September, December
