= McTeer =

McTeer is a surname. Notable people with the surname include:

- Janet McTeer (born 1961), English actress
- Maureen McTeer (born 1952), Canadian writer and lawyer
- Robert D. McTeer (born c. 1943), American economist

== See also ==
- McAteer
