= McAteer =

McAteer is a surname. Notable people with the surname include:

- Alexander McAteer (born 1964), second husband of Princess Elena of Romania
- Andy McAteer (born 1961), English professional footballer
- Eddie McAteer (1914–1986), nationalist politician in Northern Ireland
- Ed McAteer (1926–2004), a leader of the Christian right in the United States; founder of the Religious Roundtable
- Fergus McAteer (born 1946), accountant and former politician in Northern Ireland
- Ian McAteer (born 1961), former gangster from Glasgow
- Hugh McAteer (1917–1972), volunteer in, and leader of, the Irish Republican Army
- J. Eugene McAteer (1916–1967), California politician
- James McAteer (born 1978), Astrophysicist
- Jason McAteer (born 1971), Irish international footballer
- John McAteer (1933–1977), National Organiser of the Scottish National Party (SNP) from 1968 to 1977
- Kasey McAteer (born 2001), English footballer
- Mick McAteer (born 1962), Irish-British consumer campaigner (Which?, FSA, etc)
- Myrtle McAteer (1878–1952), American tennis player around the turn of the 20th century
- Sean McAteer (1892–1937), Irish communist
- Tom McAteer (1876–1959), Scottish footballer
