= Finley Barbrook =

English footballer (born 2004)

Personal information
- Full name: Finley Frank Barbrook
- Date of birth: 4 December 2004 (age 21)
- Place of birth: Southwold, England
- Position: Defensive midfielder

Team information
- Current team: Falkirk (on loan from Ipswich Town)
- Number: 16

Youth career
- Colchester United
- –2023: Ipswich Town

Senior career*
Years	Team	Apps	(Gls)
2023–	Ipswich Town	0	(0)
2023–2024	→ Chelmsford City (loan)	29	(2)
2024–2025	→ Sutton United (loan)	33	(2)
2025–2026	→ Lincoln City (loan)	0	(0)
2026	→ Colchester United (loan)	16	(1)
2026–	→ Falkirk (loan)	12	(1)
- * Club domestic league appearances and goals as of 18:00, 8 November 2026 (UTC)

Finley Frank Barbrook (born 4 December 2004) is an English professional footballer who plays as a defensive midfielder for Scottish Premiership side Falkirk, on loan from Premier League club Ipswich Town.

== Club career ==
=== Ipswich Town ===
Barbrook signed his first professional contract alongside twin brother Harry for Ipswich Town in March 2023. On 7 May 2024, Barbrook won Ipswich Town's Academy Player of the Year after being captain of the U21 side at 18 years of age. He made his debut starting the EFL Cup game away to Bromley in August 2025, where he played 70 minutes before being replaced by Jack Taylor.

==== Loans ====
On 27 October 2023, Barbrook joined Chelmsford City.

On 19 August 2024, Barbrook joined National League side Sutton United on a season-long loan. He won players' player and young player of the year at the end of season awards.

On 1 September 2025, Barbrook joined League One side Lincoln City on a season-long loan deal. He made his debut the following day, playing the full match against Notts County in the EFL Trophy. He returned to Ipswich Town in January having only played three times, all in the EFL Trophy.

On 30 January 2026, Barbrook joined League Two side Colchester United on loan for the remainder of the season.

On 7 August 2026, he joined newly promoted Scottish Premiership side Falkirk on a season-long loan.

== Personal life ==
He comes from a family of footballers, his twin brother Harry who came through at Ipswich Town alongside him and his father Matthew was a youth player also at Ipswich Town and Scunthorpe United in the 1980s.

== Career statistics ==
As of 2 May 2026

Appearances and goals by club, season and competition
Club	Season	League			FA Cup		EFL Cup		Other		Total	
Club	Season	Division	Apps	Goals	Apps	Goals	Apps	Goals	Apps	Goals	Apps	Goals
Ipswich Town	2025–26	Championship	0	0	0	0	1	0	0	0	1	0
Chelmsford City (loan)	2023–24	National League South	29	2	0	0	–		1 (Note: Appearance(s) in National League South Play offs)	0	30	2
Sutton United (loan)	2024–25	National League	33	2	2	0	–		6 (Note: Appearance(s) in FA Trophy & National League Cup)	2	41	4
Lincoln City (loan)	2025–26	League One	0	0	0	0	–		3 (Note: Appearance(s) in EFL Trophy)	0	3	0
Colchester United (loan)	2025–26	League Two	16	1	–		–		–		16	1
Career total			78	5	2	0	1	0	10	2	91	7
