= Taine Anderson =

English footballer (born 2005)

Personal information
- Full name: Taine Charlie Anderson
- Date of birth: 17 September 2005 (age 21)
- Place of birth: Gloucester, England
- Position: Left back

Team information
- Current team: Bristol City

Youth career
- –2025: Bristol City

Senior career*
Years	Team	Apps	(Gls)
2025–	Bristol City	0	(0)
2025	→ Cheltenham Town (loan)	1	(0)
- * Club domestic league appearances and goals as of 23:42 2 August 2025 (UTC)

Taine Charlie Anderson (born 17 September 2005) is an English professional footballer who plays as a defender for EFL Championship club Bristol City.

== Career ==
Anderson was born in Gloucester, and progressed through the youth-set up at Bristol City having joined in the under-7 age group. He signed a two-year professional contract with the club in the summer of 2024. He played at left-back for the Bristol City U21 side during the 2024–25 season. He signed a new three-year contract extension with Bristol City in July 2025.

He joined EFL League Two club Cheltenham Town on loan for the 2025–26 season. He made his league debut for Cheltenham on 2 August 2025, away against Cambridge United in a 1–0 defeat. After injury affected his loan spell, he returned to Bristol City in January 2026.

== Career statistics ==
As of match played 2 August 2025

Appearances and goals by club, season and competition
Club	Season	League			FA Cup		League Cup		Other		Total	
Club	Season	Division	Apps	Goals	Apps	Goals	Apps	Goals	Apps	Goals	Apps	Goals
Bristol City	2025–26	Championship	0	0	0	0	0	0	—		0	0
Cheltenham Town (loan)	2025–26	League Two	1	0	0	0	0	0	0	0	1	0
Career total			1	0	0	0	0	0	0	0	1	0
