= Tom Taylor (footballer, born 2005) =

English footballer (born 2006)

Personal information
- Full name: Thomas Jack Taylor
- Date of birth: 21 February 2006 (age 20)
- Place of birth: Chelmsford, England
- Position: Forward

Team information
- Current team: Ipswich Town

Youth career
- 2015–2025: Ipswich Town

Senior career*
Years	Team	Apps	(Gls)
2025–	Ipswich Town	0	(0)
2025–2026	→ Cheltenham Town (loan)	12	(0)
2026	→ Woking (loan)	6	(0)
- * Club domestic league appearances and goals as of 19:45, 15 April 2026 (UTC)

Thomas Jack Taylor (born 21 February 2005) is an English professional footballer who plays for Ipswich Town, as a forward.

== Career ==
Born in Chelmsford, Taylor joined Ipswich Town at the age of 10, later going on to captain the under-18's and under-21's, before featuring on the bench twice for Ipswich's first team during the 2024–25 season.

On 1 September 2025, Taylor joined Cheltenham Town on a season long loan.

On 27 March 2026, Taylor joined National League side, Woking on loan for the remainder of the season alongside Ipswich Town teammate, Steven Turner.

== Career statistics ==
As of match played 14 April 2026

Appearances and goals by club, season and competition
Club	Season	League			FA Cup		League Cup		Other		Total	
Club	Season	Division	Apps	Goals	Apps	Goals	Apps	Goals	Apps	Goals	Apps	Goals
Ipswich Town	2025–26	Championship	0	0	—		0	0	—		0	0
Cheltenham Town (loan)	2025–26	League Two	12	0	2	0	0	0	2 (Note: Appearance(s) in the EFL Trophy)	1	16	1
Woking (loan)	2025–26	National League	6	0	—		—		—		6	0
Career total			18	0	2	0	0	0	2	1	22	1
