= Robbie Cundy =

English footballer (born 1997)

Personal information
- Full name: Robbie David Cundy
- Date of birth: 30 May 1997 (age 29)
- Place of birth: Oxford, England
- Height: 6 ft 2 in (1.89 m)
- Position: Defender

Team information
- Current team: Cheltenham Town
- Number: 5

Youth career
- –2015: Oxford United

Senior career*
Years	Team	Apps	(Gls)
2015–2017	Oxford United	0	(0)
2015	→ Daventry Town (loan)	5	(1)
2015	→ Chesham United (loan)	8	(0)
2015–2016	→ Gloucester City (loan)	20	(1)
2016–2017	→ Oxford City (loan)	24	(0)
2017	→ Southport (loan)	12	(1)
2017–2018	Gloucester City	39	(3)
2018–2019	Bath City	43	(6)
2019–2022	Bristol City	14	(0)
2019	→ Exeter City (loan)	0	(0)
2019–2020	→ Torquay United (loan)	25	(1)
2020–2021	→ Cambridge United (loan)	17	(0)
2021	→ Gillingham (loan)	18	(1)
2022–2024	Barnsley	25	(2)
2024–2025	Notts County	7	(0)
2025	→ Solihull Moors (loan)	8	(0)
2025–	Cheltenham Town	37	(1)
- * Club domestic league appearances and goals as of 14:12, 22 November 2026 (UTC)

Robbie David Cundy (born 30 May 1997) is an English professional footballer who plays as a defender for EFL League Two club Cheltenham Town.

== Playing career ==
Released from Aston Villa's youth system, he began his career at hometown club Oxford United, and had loan spells in the Southern League with Daventry Town and Chesham United in 2015. He made his senior debut for the "Yellows" on 11 November 2015, in a 2–0 Football League Trophy victory over Dagenham & Redbridge at Victoria Road. The following month he joined National League North side Gloucester City on a loan deal, which was later extended until the end of the 2015–16 season.

Following the end of a loan to Oxford City during the first half of the 2016–17 season, Cundy was loaned to Southport for a month. He was released by Oxford United at the end of the season. After spending pre-season with Kidderminster Harriers, Cundy re-signed for National South side Gloucester City.

Cundy won the National League North's player of the month award in February 2016. He attended Fitzharrys Secondary School.

In the summer of 2017 he re-joined former loan club Gloucester City.

After the conclusion of the 2018–19 season, in which he made 48 appearances in all competitions for Bath City, and won the clubs' Supporters' Player of the Year, Players' Player of the Year, and Manager's Player of the Year Awards, Cundy signed for Championship side Bristol City on a two-year contract, with an option of another additional year.

Following his arrival at Bristol City, Jerry Gill, manager of Bath City, said [about Robbie Cundy]: 'He was by far one of the best centre-backs in the league and he deservedly won all the awards at our end of season dinner."

On 25 January 2021, Cundy joined League One side Gillingham on loan for the remainder of the 2020-21 season.

Cundy joined Barnsley for the start of the 2022–23 season. On 17 May 2024, the club announced he would be released in the summer when his contract expired.

On 25 July 2024, Cundy joined League Two side Notts County. In February 2025, he joined National League side Solihull Moors on loan for the remainder of the season.

On 20 May 2025, Notts County said the player would be released in June when his contract expired.

On 27 June 2025, Cundy joined Cheltenham Town on a one-year deal.

== Honours ==
Cambridge United

- EFL League Two Runner Up: 2020-21

== Career statistics ==
As of match played 21 November 2026

Appearances and goals by club, season and competition
Club	Season	League			FA Cup		League Cup		Other		Total	
Club	Season	Division	Apps	Goals	Apps	Goals	Apps	Goals	Apps	Goals	Apps	Goals
Oxford United	2014–15	League Two	0	0	0	0	0	0	0	0	0	0
Oxford United	2015–16	League Two	0	0	0	0	0	0	1 (Note: Appearance in Football League Trophy/EFL Trophy)	0	1	0
Oxford United	2016–17	League One	0	0	0	0	0	0	0	0	0	0
Oxford United	Total		0	0	0	0	0	0	1	0	1	0
Daventry Town (loan)	2014–15	SFL Div One Central	5	1	0	0	—		0	0	5	1
Chesham United (loan)	2014–15	SFL Premier Division	8	0	0	0	—		0	0	8	0
Gloucester City (loan)	2015–16	National League North	20	1	0	0	—		0	0	20	1
Oxford City (loan)	2016–17	National League South	24	0	2	0	—		1 (Note: Appearance in FA Trophy)	0	27	0
Southport (loan)	2016–17	National League	12	1	0	0	—		2 (Note: Appearances in Liverpool Senior Cup)	0	14	1
Gloucester City	2017–18	National League South	39	3	1	0	—		2 (Note: One appearance in FA Trophy, one appearance in Gloucestershire Senior Challenge Cup)	0	42	3
Bath City	2018–19	National League South	43	6	3	0	—		3 (Note: Two appearances in FA Trophy, one appearance in National League South play-offs)	0	49	6
Bristol City	2019–20	Championship	0	0	0	0	0	0	—		0	0
Bristol City	2020–21	Championship	0	0	0	0	0	0	—		0	0
Bristol City	2021–22	Championship	14	0	0	0	0	0	—		14	0
Bristol City	Total		14	0	0	0	0	0	—		14	0
Exeter City (loan)	2019–20	League Two	0	0	0	0	0	0	0	0	0	0
Torquay United (loan)	2019–20	National League	25	1	2	0	—		1	0	28	1
Cambridge United (loan)	2020–21	League Two	17	0	1	0	2	1	3	0	23	1
Gillingham (loan)	2020–21	League One	18	1	—		—		—		18	1
Barnsley	2022–23	League One	25	2	3	0	1	0	2	0	31	2
Barnsley	2023–24	League One	0	0	0	0	0	0	0	0	0	0
Barnsley	Total		25	2	3	0	1	0	2	0	31	2
Notts County	2024–25	League Two	7	0	1	0	1	0	2	0	11	0
Solihull Moors (loan)	2024–25	National League	8	0	—		—		—		8	0
Cheltenham Town	2025–26	League Two	25	1	2	1	1	0	1	0	29	2
Cheltenham Town	2026–27	League Two	12	0	1	0	1	0	1	0	15	0
Cheltenham Town	Total		37	1	3	1	2	0	2	0	44	2
Career total			302	17	16	1	6	1	19	0	343	19
