= Mactier =

Mactier or MacTier may refer to:

- Katie Mactier (born 1975), Australian cyclist
- Robert MacTier (1890–1918), Australian recipient of the Victoria Cross
- MacTier, a community in Georgian Bay, Ontario, Canada

== See also ==
- Alexander Mactier Pirrie (1882–1907), British anthropologist
- McTier
