= Josh Martin (footballer) =

English footballer (born 2001)

Personal information
- Full name: Joshua Saul Martin
- Date of birth: 9 September 2001 (age 25)
- Place of birth: Luton, England
- Height: 5 ft 10 in (1.77 m)
- Position: Winger

Youth career
- 2009–2019: Arsenal
- 2019–2020: Norwich City

Senior career*
Years	Team	Apps	(Gls)
2020–2023	Norwich City	14	(1)
2021–2022	→ Milton Keynes Dons (loan)	5	(0)
2022	→ Doncaster Rovers (loan)	20	(4)
2022–2023	→ Barnsley (loan)	17	(1)
2023–2024	Portsmouth	8	(0)
2024–2025	Notts County	8	(1)
2025	Newport County	14	(0)
2025–2026	Cheltenham Town	27	(4)
- * Club domestic league appearances and goals as of 14:12, 20 July 2026 (UTC)

Joshua Saul Martin (born 9 September 2001) is an English professional footballer who plays as a winger.

== Club career ==
=== Norwich City ===
Martin joined the academy of Arsenal at the age of 8, and progressed through the various age groups before joining Norwich City in March 2019 at the age of 17 following a successful trial period with the club's under-18 side.

Martin made his professional debut as a late substitute in a Premier League game against Southampton on 19 June 2020. He scored his first goal for Norwich in a 2-1 win against Sheffield Wednesday on 5 December 2020.

On 1 July 2021, Martin joined League One club Milton Keynes Dons on a season-long loan. Following limited opportunities with MK Dons, Martin was recalled on 17 January 2022 and sent back out on loan to another League One club, Doncaster Rovers, for the remainder of the season.

On 31 August 2022, Martin returned to League One when he joined Barnsley on a season-long loan deal, the club holding the option to make the move permanent.

=== Portsmouth ===
Martin signed a short-term deal with Portsmouth on 13 November 2023. On 1 May 2024, the club said the player would be released in the summer when his contract ended.

=== Notts County ===
On 27 September 2024, Martin joined League Two side Notts County on a short-term deal until January 2025.

=== Newport County ===
On 22 January 2025, Martin joined EFL League Two club Newport County on a short-term deal until the end of the 2024-25 season with the option to extend. He made his debut for Newport on 24 January 2025 as a second-half substitute in the 2-1 EFL League Two defeat to Swindon Town. He was released by Newport County at the end of the 2024-25 season.

=== Cheltenham Town ===
On 15 August 2025, Martin joined Cheltenham Town on a one-year deal following a trial period with the club. He made 32 appearances for the club, scoring five goals, before being released at the end of the season.

== Personal life ==
Martin was born in Luton, England on 9 September 2001 and is of English, Irish, and Jamaican heritage.

== Career statistics ==
As of end of 2025–26 season

Appearances and goals by club, season and competition
Club	Season	League			FA Cup		League Cup		Other		Total	
Club	Season	Division	Apps	Goals	Apps	Goals	Apps	Goals	Apps	Goals	Apps	Goals
Norwich City U23	2019–20	—							2 (Note: Appearance(s) in EFL Trophy)	0	2	0
Norwich City U23	2020–21	—							1	1	1	1
Norwich City U23	Total		—		—		—		3	1	3	1
Norwich City	2019–20	Premier League	5	0	0	0	0	0	0	0	5	0
Norwich City	2020–21	Championship	9	1	1	0	1	0	0	0	11	1
Norwich City	2021–22	Premier League	0	0	0	0	0	0	0	0	0	0
Norwich City	2022–23	Championship	0	0	0	0	0	0	0	0	0	0
Norwich City	Total		14	1	1	0	1	0	0	0	16	1
Milton Keynes Dons (loan)	2021–22	League One	5	0	1	0	1	1	5	0	12	1
Doncaster Rovers (loan)	2021–22	League One	20	4	—		—		—		20	4
Barnsley (loan)	2022–23	League One	17	1	3	0	0	0	3	2	23	3
Portsmouth	2023–24	League One	8	0	0	0	0	0	1	0	9	0
Notts County	2024–25	League Two	8	1	2	0	0	0	2	0	12	1
Newport County	2024–25	League Two	14	0	0	0	0	0	0	0	14	0
Cheltenham Town	2025–26	League Two	27	4	2	0	1	0	2	1	32	5
Career total			113	11	9	0	3	1	16	4	141	16

== Honours ==
Norwich City

- EFL Championship: 2020–21

Portsmouth

- EFL League One: 2023–24
