= Jack Taylor (footballer, born 1998) =

Irish footballer (born 1998)

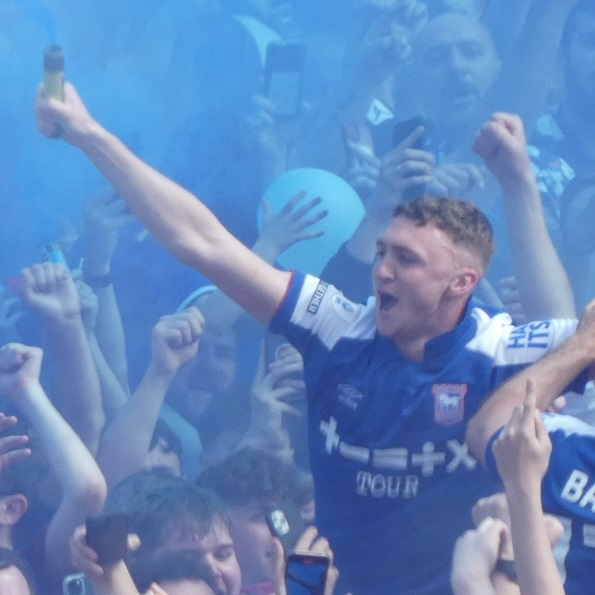
- Taylor celebrating Ipswich Town's promotion to the Premier League in 2024

Personal information
- Full name: Jack Henry Philip Taylor
- Date of birth: 23 June 1998 (age 28)
- Place of birth: Hammersmith, England
- Height: 6 ft 1 in (1.85 m)
- Position: Defensive midfielder

Team information
- Current team: Ipswich Town
- Number: 14

Youth career
- 2005–2012: Chelsea
- 2012–2016: Barnet

Senior career*
Years	Team	Apps	(Gls)
2013–2020	Barnet	106	(13)
2016	→ Hampton & Richmond Borough (loan)	6	(0)
2020–2023	Peterborough United	125	(17)
2023–	Ipswich Town	104	(5)

International career^{‡}
2019–2020	Republic of Ireland U21	7	(0)
2024–	Republic of Ireland	11	(0)
- * Club domestic league appearances and goals as of 22:37, 4 May 2026 (UTC) ‡ National team caps and goals as of 22:25, 26 March 2026 (UTC)

Jack Henry Philip Taylor (born 23 June 1998) is a professional footballer who plays as a defensive midfielder for Premier League club Ipswich Town. Born in England, he represents the Republic of Ireland national team.

== Club career ==
Taylor was in the youth team at Chelsea for seven years, before joining Barnet in 2012. He made his senior debut as a 15-year-old when he came on as a substitute in a 3–1 Herts Senior Cup win over Hatfield Town on 3 December 2013. He signed a two-year professional contract in April 2016, and made his professional debut for the first team on 4 October 2016 in an EFL Trophy match against Norwich City. Taylor joined Hampton & Richmond Borough on loan for a month on 28 October 2016. He was recalled from loan in December, and made his league debut against Yeovil Town on 10 December. He agreed a new contract with the club in February 2017, and made 14 league appearances for Barnet in total during the 2016–17 season.

On 1 August 2019, Taylor agreed a new three-year contract with Barnet.

After being a standout player for Barnet in the early stages of the 2019–20 season, he joined Peterborough United on 7 January 2020 for an initial fee of £500,000. He scored 22 goals in 138 games for Posh.

Taylor signed for Ipswich Town for an undisclosed fee on a three-year deal in June 2023. He scored on his debut for Ipswich in a 2–0 win over Bristol Rovers in the EFL Cup on 9 August 2023.

On 14 May 2026, the club said Taylor had successfully undergone cartilage surgery,

== International career ==
Taylor is eligible to play for the Republic of Ireland due to his grandfather being from County Longford in Ireland, which provided him with Irish citizenship since birth. Taylor was called up to the Republic of Ireland U21 squad for the 2019 Toulon Tournament in June 2019. Taylor scored a brace in a training match against the senior team on 30 May 2019. He made his debut as a substitute against Bahrain U23 on 9 June. He received his first senior call-up in November 2020 for a UEFA Nations League match against Bulgaria. On 1 September 2021, he was named FAI Under-21 International Player of the Year for 2020.

Taylor made his debut for the Republic of Ireland national team on 13 October 2024 in a Nations League game against Greece at the Karaiskakis Stadium. He was substituted on for Evan Ferguson in the 57th minute, as Greece won 2–0.

== Personal life ==
Taylor's older brother Harry (born 1997) was also in the youth team at Chelsea and is now a professional at Southend United.

== Career statistics ==
=== Club ===
As of match played 2 May 2026

Appearances and goals by club, season and competition
Club	Season	League			FA Cup		League Cup		Other		Total	
Club	Season	Division	Apps	Goals	Apps	Goals	Apps	Goals	Apps	Goals	Apps	Goals
Barnet	2013–14	Conference Premier	0	0	0	0	―		2 (Note: Appearance in Herts Senior Cup)	0	2	0
Barnet	2014–15	Conference Premier	0	0	0	0	―		1	0	1	0
Barnet	2015–16	League Two	0	0	0	0	0	0	0	0	0	0
Barnet	2016–17	League Two	14	0	0	0	0	0	1 (Note: Appearance in the EFL Trophy)	0	15	0
Barnet	2017–18	League Two	38	2	1	0	1	0	3 (Note: Two appearances in EFL Trophy, one appearance in Middlesex Senior Cup)	1	43	3
Barnet	2018–19	National League	30	3	7	1	―		3 (Note: Appearance in the FA Trophy)	0	40	4
Barnet	2019–20	National League	24	8	3	1	―		1	0	28	9
Barnet	Total		106	13	11	2	1	0	11	1	129	16
Hampton & Richmond (loan)	2016–17	National League South	6	0	0	0	―		0	0	6	0
Peterborough United	2019–20	League One	11	2	—		—		—		11	2
Peterborough United	2020–21	League One	36	4	2	2	1	0	1	1	40	7
Peterborough United	2021–22	Championship	34	3	1	0	0	0	―		35	3
Peterborough United	2022–23	League One	44	8	2	0	2	0	4 (Note: Two appearances and one goal in EFL Trophy, two appearances and one goal in League One playoffs)	2	52	10
Peterborough United	Total		125	17	5	2	3	0	5	3	138	22
Ipswich Town	2023–24	Championship	33	2	2	1	4	2	―		39	5
Ipswich Town	2024–25	Premier League	32	1	3	1	1	0	―		36	2
Ipswich Town	2025–26	Championship	39	2	2	0	1	0	―		42	2
Ipswich Town	Total		104	5	7	2	6	2	0	0	117	9
Career total			341	35	23	6	10	2	16	4	390	47

=== International ===
As of match played 26 March 2026

Appearances and goals by national team and year
National team	Year	Apps	Goals
Republic of Ireland
Republic of Ireland	2024	1	0
Republic of Ireland	2025	9	0
Republic of Ireland	2026	1	0
Total		11	0

== Honours ==
Peterborough United

- EFL League One runner-up: 2020–21

Ipswich Town

- EFL Championship runner-up: 2023–24

Individual

- Barnet Young Player of the Season: 2017–18
- FAI Under-21 International Player of the Year: 2020
- Peterborough United Goal of the Season: 2021–22
