= Kasey McAteer =

Irish footballer (born 2001)

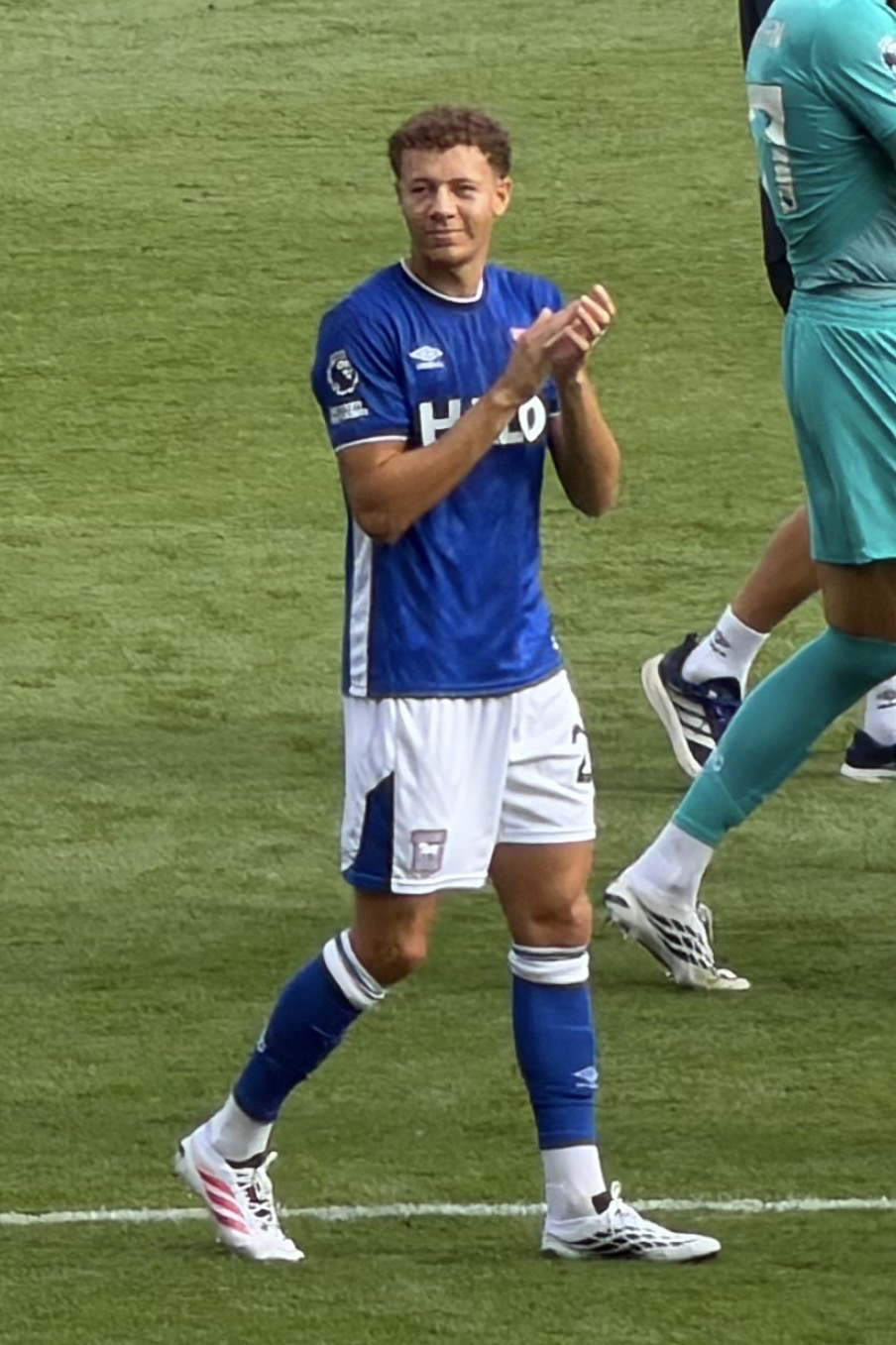
- McAteer with Ipswich Town in 2026

Personal information
- Full name: Kasey Ian Robert McAteer
- Date of birth: 22 November 2001 (age 24)
- Place of birth: Northampton, England
- Positions: Attacking midfielder; right winger

Team information
- Current team: Ipswich Town
- Number: 20

Youth career
- 2010–2021: Leicester City

Senior career*
Years	Team	Apps	(Gls)
2021–2025	Leicester City	44	(7)
2022	→ Forest Green Rovers (loan)	9	(0)
2023	→ AFC Wimbledon (loan)	18	(1)
2025–	Ipswich Town	29	(3)

International career^{‡}
2024–	Republic of Ireland	8	(1)
- * Club domestic league appearances and goals as of 03:03, 3 May 2026 (UTC) ‡ National team caps and goals as of 22:27, 9 September 2025 (UTC)

Kasey Ian Robert McAteer (born 22 November 2001) is a professional footballer who plays as an attacking midfielder or right winger for Premier League club Ipswich Town. Born in England, he represents the Republic of Ireland national team.

== Club career ==
McAteer joined the Leicester City Academy at the age of eight. He made his Premier League debut as an 88th-minute substitute for James Maddison during a 4–0 win against Newcastle United on 12 December 2021.

On 28 January 2022, McAteer joined League Two club Forest Green Rovers on loan until the end of the 2021–22 season, with director of football Rich Hughes stating McAteer was "too good to turn down". He made his debut in a 1–1 draw against Port Vale on 1 February. He finished his loan with 9 appearances.

On 31 January 2023, McAteer joined AFC Wimbledon on a six-month loan. He made his Wimbledon debut on 11 February in a 0–0 draw to Carlisle United. On 10 April, he scored his first goal for the club in a 3–2 loss against Salford City. He finished his loan with 18 appearances and 1 goal.

Following Leicester's relegation to the Championship for the 2023–24 season, new manager Enzo Maresca handed McAteer his first start for the senior team in the opening game of the season on 6 August 2023, a 2–1 home win against Coventry City in the Championship. On 26 August, he scored his first goal in Championship for Leicester, in a 2–1 away win against Rotherham United. He scored both goals for the club to win the game.

== International career ==
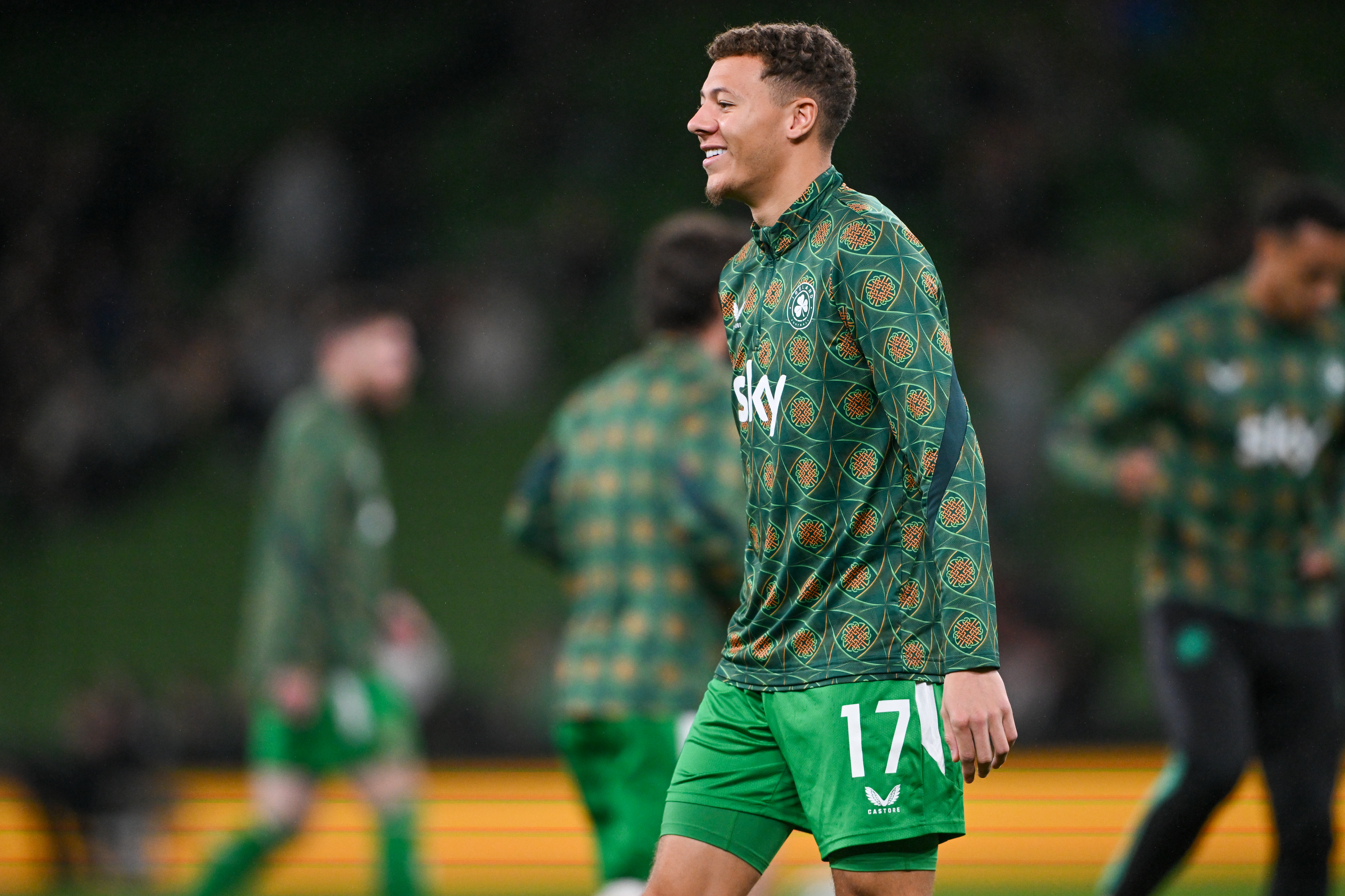
McAteer with the Republic of Ireland in 2025

Born in England, McAteer's maternal grandmother was from Offaly and his maternal grandfather was from Belfast. He was called up to the Republic of Ireland squad on 29 August for 2024 for their upcoming England and Greece games, after completing paperwork and receiving FIFA clearance. He debuted on 7 September 2024 in a Nations League game against England at the Aviva Stadium. He was a substitute coming on for Adam Idah in the 75th minute as England won 2–0. McAteer scored his first international goal on 6 June 2025, opening the scoring in a 1–1 draw with Senegal at the Aviva Stadium.

== Career statistics ==
=== Club ===
As of match played 2 May 2026

Appearances and goals by club, season and competition
Club	Season	League			FA Cup		League Cup		Other		Total	
Club	Season	Division	Apps	Goals	Apps	Goals	Apps	Goals	Apps	Goals	Apps	Goals
Leicester City U23	2020–21	—			—		—		4 (Note: Appearances in EFL Trophy)	0	4	0
Leicester City U23	2021–22	—			—		—		3	0	3	0
Leicester City U23	2022–23	—			—		—		2	0	2	0
Leicester City U23	Total		—		—		—		9	0	9	0
Leicester City	2021–22	Premier League	1	0	1	0	0	0	0	0	2	0
Leicester City	2022–23	Premier League	0	0	1	0	1	0	—		2	0
Leicester City	2023–24	Championship	23	6	1	0	2	1	—		26	7
Leicester City	2024–25	Premier League	18	1	2	0	3	0	—		23	1
Leicester City	2025–26	Championship	2	0	0	0	1	0	—		3	0
Leicester City	Total		44	7	5	0	7	1	0	0	56	8
Ipswich Town	2025–26	Championship	29	3	2	0	—		—		31	3
Forest Green Rovers (loan)	2021–22	League Two	9	0	—		—		—		9	0
AFC Wimbledon (loan)	2022–23	League Two	18	1	—		—		—		18	1
Career total			100	11	7	0	7	1	9	0	123	12

=== International ===
As of match played 9 September 2025

Appearances and goals by national team and year
National team	Year	Apps	Goals
Republic of Ireland	2024	4	0
Republic of Ireland	2025	4	1
Total		8	1

Scores and results list Ireland's goal tally first, score column indicates score after each McAteer goal.

List of international goals scored by Kasey McAteer
No.	Date	Venue	Opponent	Score	Result	Competition
1	6 June 2025	Aviva Stadium, Dublin, Ireland	Senegal	1–0	1–1	Friendly

== Honours ==
Forest Green Rovers

- EFL League Two: 2021–22

Leicester City

- EFL Championship: 2023–24

Ipswich Town

- EFL Championship runner-up: 2025–26
