= Jokūbas Mažionis =

Lithuanian footballer (born 2006)

Personal information
- Date of birth: 23 June 2006 (age 20)
- Position: Defender

Team information
- Current team: Ipswich Town

Youth career
- Arsenal
- West Ham United
- Kinetic Foundation
- Enfield Borough

Senior career*
Years	Team	Apps	(Gls)
2022–2023	Enfield Borough	5	(0)
2023–	Ipswich Town	0	(0)
2025	→ Woking (loan)	6	(0)
2025–2026	→ Cheltenham Town (loan)	7	(0)

International career
- Lithuania U16
- Lithuania U17
2025–	Lithuania U21		
- * Club domestic league appearances and goals as of 13:23, 2 January 2026 (UTC)

Jokūbas Mažionis (born 23 June 2006) is a Lithuanian professional footballer who plays as a defender for Premier League club Ipswich Town.

== Club career ==
After playing for Arsenal, West Ham United, and Kinetic Foundation, Mažionis began his senior career aged 16 with Enfield Borough, for whom he made five appearances. He then joined Ipswich Town in May 2023, where he turned professional and captained their under-21 team. He also trained with the first-team.

He moved on loan to Woking in January 2025, making 9 appearances in all competitions.

He moved on loan to Cheltenham Town in July 2025. On 2 January 2026, he returned to his parent club with much of his loan spell having been impacted by injuries.

== International career ==
Mažionis represented Lithuania at under-16 and under-17 youth levels. In 2025 he began playing for the under-21 team.
