= 2024–25 EFL Trophy =

English football tournament season

Tournament details
- Country: England; Wales
- Teams: 64

Final positions
- Champions: Peterborough United (3rd title)
- Runners-up: Birmingham City

Tournament statistics
- Matches played: 127
- Goals scored: 404 (3.18 per match)
- Attendance: 332,398 (2,617 per match)
- Top goal scorer: (Wales) Aaron Collins Bolton Wanderers (6 Goals)

The 2024–25 EFL Trophy, known as the Vertu Trophy (Note: Known as the Bristol Street Motors Trophy during the group stage.) for sponsorship reasons, was the 44th season in the history of the competition, and was a knock-out tournament for clubs in EFL League One and League Two, the third and fourth tiers of the English football league system, as well as the "Academy teams" of 16 Premier League teams.

The defending champions were Peterborough United, who defeated Wycombe Wanderers 2–1 in the previous season's final. They successfully defended their title by beating Birmingham City, 2–0 in the final, and by doing so, they become the first team to retain the trophy.

== Participating clubs ==
- 48 clubs from League One and League Two.
- 16 invited Category One Academy teams.

	League One	League Two	Academies
Clubs	Barnsley; Birmingham City; Blackpool; Bolton Wanderers; Bristol Rovers; Burton Albion; Cambridge United; Charlton Athletic; Crawley Town; Exeter City; Huddersfield Town; Leyton Orient; Lincoln City; Mansfield Town; Northampton Town; Peterborough United; Reading; Rotherham United; Shrewsbury Town; Stevenage; Stockport County; Wigan Athletic; Wrexham; Wycombe Wanderers	Accrington Stanley; AFC Wimbledon; Barrow; Bradford City; Bromley; Carlisle United; Cheltenham Town; Chesterfield; Colchester United; Crewe Alexandra; Doncaster Rovers; Fleetwood Town; Gillingham; Grimsby Town; Harrogate Town; Milton Keynes Dons; Morecambe; Newport County; Notts County; Port Vale; Salford City; Swindon Town; Tranmere Rovers; Walsall	Arsenal; Aston Villa; Brighton & Hove Albion; Chelsea; Crystal Palace; Everton; Fulham; Leicester City; Liverpool; Manchester City; Manchester United; Newcastle United; Nottingham Forest; Tottenham Hotspur; West Ham United; Wolverhampton Wanderers
Total	24	24	16

== Eligibility criteria for players ==
For EFL clubs

- Minimum of four qualifying outfield players in their starting XI. A qualifying outfield player was one who met any of the following requirements:
  - Any player who started the previous or following first-team fixture.
  - Any player who is in the top 10 players at the club who has made the most starting appearances in league and domestic cup competitions this season.
  - Any player with forty or more first-team starting appearances in their career, including International matches.
  - Any player on loan from a Premier League club or any EFL Category One Academy club.
- A club can play any eligible goalkeeper in the competition.
- Any player out on a long loan term at a National League, National League North, or National League South team can play as long as the loaning team agree to allow the player to return for the match.

For invited teams

- Minimum of six players in the starting line-up who are aged under 21 on 30 June 2024.
- Maximum of two players on the team sheet who are aged over 21 and have also made forty or more senior appearances.

== Competition format ==
Group stage

- Sixteen groups of four teams will be organised on a regionalised basis.
- All groups will include one invited club.
- All clubs will play each other once, either home or away (academy sides will play all group matches away from home).
- Clubs will be awarded three points for a win and one point for a draw.
- In the event of a drawn game (after 90 minutes), a penalty shoot-out will be held with the winning team earning an additional point.
- Clubs expelled from the EFL will be knocked out of the tournament automatically.
- The top two teams in each group will progress to the knockout stage.
- In an Event of which group stage match has been postponed, the Postponed Group stage match will be rescheduled to a no further date than the second Tuesday of November 2024.

Knockout stage

- Rounds 2 and 3 of the competition will be drawn on a regionalised basis.
- In Round 2, the group winners will be seeded and the group runners-up will be unseeded in the draw.
- In Round 3, teams who played in the same group as each other in the group stage will be kept apart.

== Group stage ==
The group stage draw was announced on 24 June 2024, with the Academy teams being drawn on 27 June 2024 on Sky Sports News.

=== Northern section ===
==== Group A ====
Pos	Div	Team	Pld	W	PW	PL	L	GF	GA	GD	Pts	Qualification
1	L1	Stockport County	3	2	0	0	1	8	4	+4	6	Advance to Round 2
2	L2	Tranmere Rovers	3	2	0	0	1	5	4	+1	6	Advance to Round 2
3	ACA	Everton U21	3	1	0	0	2	5	7	−2	3	
4	L2	Accrington Stanley	3	1	0	0	2	4	7	−3	3	

Source: EFL

20 August 2024	Tranmere Rovers	1–3	Everton U21	Birkenhead
19:45 BST (UTC+1)	Davison 11'	Report	Beto 86', 90+2'; Sherif 90+5'	Stadium: Prenton Park; Attendance: 1,296; Referee: Richie Watkins

3 September 2024	Accrington Stanley	1–4	Stockport County	Accrington
19:45 BST (UTC+1)	Hunter 7'	Report	Stretton 33', 35'; Camps 82'; Barry 90+1'	Stadium: Crown Ground; Attendance: 791; Referee: Scott Jackson

17 September 2024	Stockport County	4–1	Everton U21	Stockport
19:45 BST (UTC+1)	Olaofe 30', 51'; Fevrier 33'; Powell 62'		Benjamin 83'	Stadium: Edgeley Park; Attendance: 1,299; Referee: Paul Marsden

8 October 2024	Tranmere Rovers	2–1	Accrington Stanley	Birkenhead
19:45 BST (UTC+1)	Hawkes 49'; Taylor 75'	Report	Popoola 90'	Stadium: Prenton Park; Attendance: 919; Referee: Zac Kennard-Kettle

29 October 2024	Accrington Stanley	2–1	Everton U21	Accrington
19:45 GMT	Whitaker 24' (o.g.); Woods 59'	Report	Armstrong 28'	Stadium: Crown Ground; Attendance: 450; Referee: John Mulligan

12 November 2024	Stockport County	0–2	Tranmere Rovers	Stockport
19:00 GMT		Report	Dennis 21'; Hawkes 39'	Stadium: Edgeley Park; Attendance: 1,236; Referee: Jamie O'Connor

==== Group B ====
Pos	Div	Team	Pld	W	PW	PL	L	GF	GA	GD	Pts	Qualification
1	L1	Wrexham	3	2	0	1	0	6	2	+4	7	Advance to Round 2
2	L2	Port Vale	3	1	2	0	0	5	3	+2	7	Advance to Round 2
3	L2	Salford City	3	1	0	0	2	4	6	−2	3	
4	ACA	Wolverhampton Wanderers U21	3	0	0	1	2	4	8	−4	1	

Source: EFL

20 August 2024	Salford City	0–2	Port Vale	Salford
19:45 BST (UTC+1)		Report	Edwards 50'; Paton 71'	Stadium: Moor Lane; Attendance: 693; Referee: Ruebyn Ricards

3 September 2024	Port Vale	2–2 (5–4 p)	Wolverhampton Wanderers U21	Stoke-on-Trent
19:45 BST (UTC+1)	Tolaj 59'; Curtis 89'	Report	Edozie 26'; Holman 86'	Stadium: Vale Park; Attendance: 851; Referee: Aaron Bannister
	Penalties
	Tolaj (penalty scored); Curtis (penalty scored); Sang (penalty scored); Richards (penalty scored); Lowe (penalty missed); Plant (penalty scored)		(penalty scored) Barnett; (penalty scored) Holman; (penalty scored) Keto-Diyawa; (penalty missed) Whittingham; (penalty scored) Esen; (penalty missed) Farmer

10 September 2024	Wrexham	2–1	Salford City	Wrexham
19:30 BST (UTC+1)	Mullin 18'; Austerfield 83' (o.g.)	Report	McAleny 52'	Stadium: Racecourse Ground; Attendance: 6,640; Referee: Dale Baines

8 October 2024	Wrexham	3–0	Wolverhampton Wanderers U21	Wrexham
19:45 BST (UTC+1)	Brunt 22'; Mullin 38'; Faal 57'	Report		Stadium: Racecourse Ground; Attendance: 3,987; Referee: Elliot Bell

12 November 2024	Port Vale	1–1 (3–1 p)	Wrexham	Stoke-on-Trent
19:45 GMT	Richards 82'	Report	Cleworth 51'	Stadium: Vale Park; Attendance: 1,837; Referee: Steven Copeland
	Penalties
	Tolaj (penalty scored); Lowe (penalty scored); Grant (penalty scored); Richards (penalty missed)		(penalty scored) Mullin; (penalty missed) Forde; (penalty missed) Revan; (penalty missed) Rathbone

12 November 2024	Salford City	3–2	Wolverhampton Wanderers U21	Salford
19:45 GMT	Davies 8', 67'; Stockton 11'	Report	Voice 42'; Barnett 90+3'	Stadium: Moor Lane; Attendance: 503; Referee: Stuart Morland

==== Group C ====
Pos	Div	Team	Pld	W	PW	PL	L	GF	GA	GD	Pts	Qualification
1	L2	Morecambe	3	2	0	0	1	7	5	+2	6	Advance to Round 2
2	L1	Wigan Athletic	3	1	1	0	1	3	2	+1	5	Advance to Round 2
3	ACA	Nottingham Forest U21	3	1	0	1	1	4	5	−1	4	
4	L2	Carlisle United	3	1	0	0	2	3	5	−2	3	

Source: EFL

3 September 2024	Carlisle United	1–2	Nottingham Forest U21	Carlisle
19:00 BST (UTC+1)	Allan 88'	Report	Gardner 31'; Whitehall 90+4'	Stadium: Brunton Park; Attendance: 1,102; Referee: James Westgate

3 September 2024	Wigan Athletic	1–2	Morecambe	Wigan
19:00 BST (UTC+1)	Hugill 63' (pen.)	Report	Macadam 12'; Angol 65'	Stadium: DW Stadium; Attendance: 1,702; Referee: Jacob Miles

8 October 2024	Carlisle United	0–2	Wigan Athletic	Carlisle
19:00 BST (UTC+1)		Report	Stones 7' (pen.); Olakigbe 23'	Stadium: Brunton Park; Attendance: 1,117; Referee: Steven Copeland

8 October 2024	Morecambe	4–2	Nottingham Forest U21	Morecambe
19:00 BST (UTC+1)	Tollitt 42', 87'; Brown 67'; Hope 78'	Report	Back 22'; Lewis 50' (o.g.)	Stadium: Mazuma Mobile Stadium; Attendance: 621; Referee: John Mulligan

12 November 2024	Morecambe	1–2	Carlisle United	Morecambe
19:00 GMT	Hope 16'	Report	O'Donoghue 75'; Williams 78'	Stadium: Mazuma Mobile Stadium; Attendance: 788; Referee: Edward Duckworth

12 November 2024	Wigan Athletic	0–0 (3–0 p)	Nottingham Forest U21	Wigan
19:00 GMT		Report		Stadium: DW Stadium; Attendance: 1,449; Referee: Scott Tallis
	Penalties
	Thomas (penalty scored); Smith (penalty scored); Aimson (penalty scored)		(penalty missed) Nadin; (penalty missed) Sinclair; (penalty missed) McAdam

==== Group D ====
Pos	Div	Team	Pld	W	PW	PL	L	GF	GA	GD	Pts	Qualification
1	L1	Bolton Wanderers	3	2	0	1	0	6	4	+2	7	Advance to Round 2
2	ACA	Aston Villa U21	3	1	1	0	1	4	6	−2	5	Advance to Round 2
3	L2	Fleetwood Town	3	1	0	0	2	6	5	+1	3	
4	L2	Barrow	3	1	0	0	2	5	6	−1	3	

Source: EFL

3 September 2024	Fleetwood Town	2–3	Aston Villa U21	Fleetwood
19:00 BST (UTC+1)	Coughlan 53'; Odubeko 58'	Report	Buendía 28', 40'; Pierre 88'	Stadium: Highbury Stadium; Attendance: 726; Referee: Zac Kennard-Kettle

3 September 2024	Barrow	2–3	Bolton Wanderers	Barrow-in-Furness
19:45 BST (UTC+1)	Foley 38'; Dallas 81'	Report	McAtee 68'; Collins 73'; Dempsey 79'	Stadium: Holker Street; Attendance: 2,005; Referee: Thomas Parsons

8 October 2024	Fleetwood Town	3–0	Barrow	Fleetwood
19:00 BST (UTC+1)	Harratt 24', 35'; Smith 84'	Report		Stadium: Highbury Stadium; Attendance: 734; Referee: James Westgate

8 October 2024	Bolton Wanderers	1–1 (1–4 p)	Aston Villa U21	Horwich
19:45 BST (UTC+1)	Adeboyejo 79'	Report	Mulley 33'	Stadium: Toughsheet Community Stadium; Attendance: 1,767; Referee: Aaron Bannister
	Penalties
	Collins (penalty missed); Dempsey (penalty scored); Thomason (penalty missed)		(penalty scored) Borland; (penalty scored) Amundsen-Day; (penalty scored) Brannigan; (penalty scored) Burrowes

12 November 2024	Barrow	3–0	Aston Villa U21	Barrow-in-Furness
19:00 GMT	Telford 2'; Vassell 67'; Dallas 74'	Report		Stadium: Holker Street; Attendance: 539; Referee: Martin Woods

12 November 2024	Bolton Wanderers	2–1	Fleetwood Town	Horwich
19:45 GMT	Collins 26', 90+1'	Report	Graydon 52'	Stadium: Toughsheet Community Stadium; Attendance: 1,607; Referee: Elliot Bell

==== Group E ====
Pos	Div	Team	Pld	W	PW	PL	L	GF	GA	GD	Pts	Qualification
1	L1	Blackpool	3	1	1	1	0	6	3	+3	6	Advance to Round 2
2	L2	Crewe Alexandra	3	2	0	0	1	7	5	+2	6	Advance to Round 2
3	ACA	Liverpool U21	3	0	1	1	1	2	6	−4	3	
4	L2	Harrogate Town	3	0	1	1	1	3	4	−1	3	

Source: EFL

27 August 2024	Crewe Alexandra	5–1	Liverpool U21	Crewe
19:30 BST (UTC+1)	Roberts 3'; Long 30', 43'; Cooney 51' (pen.); Thibaut 74'	Report	Corness 10' (pen.)	Stadium: Gresty Road; Attendance: 1,445; Referee: Neil Hair

3 September 2024	Blackpool	4–1	Crewe Alexandra	Blackpool
19:00 BST (UTC+1)	Rhodes 3'; Hamilton 43', 63'; Carey 55'	Report	Bogle 65'	Stadium: Bloomfield Road; Attendance: 1,474; Referee: Martin Woods

24 September 2024	Harrogate Town	1–1 (4–2 p)	Liverpool U21	Harrogate
19:45 BST (UTC+1)	Muldoon 44'	Report	Norris 75'	Stadium: Wetherby Road; Attendance: 2,037
	Penalties
	Taylor (penalty scored); March (penalty scored); Foulds (penalty scored); Duke-McKenna (penalty scored)		Miles (penalty missed); Pilling (penalty scored); Davidson (penalty scored); Koné-Doherty (penalty missed)

8 October 2024	Crewe Alexandra	1–0	Harrogate Town	Crewe
19:45 BST (UTC+1)	Agius 30'	Report		Stadium: Gresty Road; Attendance: 780; Referee: James Oldham

6 November 2024	Blackpool	0–0 (7–8 p)	Liverpool U21	Blackpool
19:00 GMT		Report		Stadium: Bloomfield Road; Attendance: 1,958; Referee: Zac Kennard-Kettle
	Penalties
	Rhodes (penalty scored); Fletcher (penalty scored); Thompson (penalty scored); Bondo (penalty missed); Pennington (penalty scored); Ashworth (penalty scored); Knight (penalty scored); Schluter (penalty scored); Gwanzura (penalty missed)		(penalty scored) Morton; (penalty scored) Hill; (penalty scored) Pilling; (penalty scored) Figueroa; (penalty missed) Corness; (penalty scored) Jonas; (penalty scored) Norris; (penalty scored) Evans; (penalty scored) Pitt

12 November 2024	Harrogate Town	2–2 (4–5 p)	Blackpool	Harrogate
19:45 GMT	Nto 26'; Burrell 38'	Report	Rhodes 79'; Finnigan 88'	Stadium: Wetherby Road; Attendance: 1,343; Referee: Oliver Mackey
	Penalties
	Muldoon (penalty missed); March (penalty scored); Foulds (penalty scored); Duke-McKenna (penalty scored); Cornelius (penalty scored)		(penalty scored) Rhodes; (penalty scored) Embleton; (penalty scored) Hamilton; (penalty scored) Husband; (penalty scored) Apter

==== Group F ====
Pos	Div	Team	Pld	W	PW	PL	L	GF	GA	GD	Pts	Qualification
1	L2	Doncaster Rovers	3	2	0	1	0	8	5	+3	7	Advance to Round 2
2	L1	Huddersfield Town	3	2	0	0	1	7	3	+4	6	Advance to Round 2
3	ACA	Manchester United U21	3	1	1	0	1	7	9	−2	5	
4	L1	Barnsley	3	0	0	0	3	3	8	−5	0	

Source: EFL

20 August 2024	Barnsley	2–3	Manchester United U21	Barnsley
19:45 BST (UTC+1)	Yoganathan 10', 37'	Report	Ennis 81'; Fletcher 84', 87'	Stadium: Oakwell; Attendance: 2,638; Referee: Michael Barlow

3 September 2024	Doncaster Rovers	2–1	Huddersfield Town	Doncaster
19:00 BST (UTC+1)	Yeboah 37'; Ironside 83' (pen.)	Report	Ward 49'	Stadium: Keepmoat Stadium; Attendance: 2,319; Referee: Declan Bourne

24 September 2024	Doncaster Rovers	3–3 (3–5 p)	Manchester United U21	Doncaster
19:00 BST (UTC+1)	Sbarra 24'; Yeboah 50'; Broadbent 65'	Report	Mather 11'; Ennis 72'; Jackson 90+6'	Stadium: Keepmoat Stadium; Attendance: 3,198
	Penalties
	Ironside (penalty scored); Molyneux (penalty scored); Broadbent (penalty missed); Gibson (penalty scored)		Mather (penalty scored); Wheatley (penalty scored); Fletcher (penalty scored); Amass (penalty scored); Biancheri (penalty scored)

8 October 2024	Huddersfield Town	2–0	Barnsley	Huddersfield
19:45 BST (UTC+1)	Ladapo 59'; Ward 90+1'	Report		Stadium: Kirklees Stadium; Attendance: 2,182; Referee: Michael Salisbury

29 October 2024	Barnsley	1–3	Doncaster Rovers	Barnsley
19:00 GMT	Marsh 78'	Report	Ironside 45+1'; Clifton 72'; Hurst 84'	Stadium: Oakwell; Attendance: 1,813; Referee: Elliot Bell

12 November 2024	Huddersfield Town	4–1	Manchester United U21	Huddersfield
19:45 GMT	Wiles 29'; Healey 67'; Kasumu 90'; Lees 90+7'	Report	Musa 42'	Stadium: Kirklees Stadium; Attendance: 3,021; Referee: Dale Baines

==== Group G ====
Pos	Div	Team	Pld	W	PW	PL	L	GF	GA	GD	Pts	Qualification
1	L2	Chesterfield	3	2	1	0	0	5	3	+2	8	Advance to Round 2
2	L1	Lincoln City	3	2	0	0	1	7	2	+5	6	Advance to Round 2
3	ACA	Manchester City U21	3	0	1	1	1	2	7	−5	3	
4	L2	Grimsby Town	3	0	0	1	2	4	6	−2	1	

Source: EFL

20 August 2024	Chesterfield	1–1 (4–2 p)	Manchester City U21	Chesterfield
19:45 BST (UTC+1)	Oldaker 79'	Report	Wright 52'	Stadium: SMH Group Stadium; Attendance: 2,446; Referee: Elliot Bell
	Penalties
	Oldaker (penalty scored); Drummond (penalty scored); Cook (penalty scored); Berry (penalty scored)		(penalty missed) Wright; (penalty scored) Mukasa; (penalty scored) O'Reilly; (penalty missed) Dickson

3 September 2024	Lincoln City	0–1	Chesterfield	Lincoln
19:00 BST (UTC+1)		Report	Cook 55'	Stadium: Sincil Bank; Attendance: 2,208; Referee: Ruebyn Ricardo

8 October 2024	Grimsby Town	1–2	Lincoln City	Cleethorpes
19:45 BST (UTC+1)	Svanþórsson 58'	Report	Cadamarteri 66'; Moylan 90+4'	Stadium: Blundell Park; Attendance: 1,270; Referee: Oliver Mackey

29 October 2024	Grimsby Town	1–1 (4–5 p)	Manchester City U21	Cleethorpes
19:45 GMT	Rose 90+1'	Report	R. Heskey 89'	Stadium: Blundell Park; Attendance: 927; Referee: Zac Kennard-Kettle
	Penalties
	Cass (penalty scored); Carson (penalty scored); Green (penalty scored); Hume (penalty missed); Rose (penalty scored); Gardner (penalty missed)		(penalty scored) Mukasa; (penalty missed) Gray; (penalty scored) Dickson; (penalty scored) R. Heskey; (penalty scored) Whatmuff; (penalty scored) J. Heskey

12 November 2024	Chesterfield	3–2	Grimsby Town	Chesterfield
19:45 GMT	Berry 8', 58'; Madden 39'	Report	Cass 18'; Gardner 47'	Stadium: SMH Group Stadium; Attendance: 1,538; Referee: Michael Barlow

12 November 2024	Lincoln City	5–0	Manchester City U21	Lincoln
19:45 BST (UTC+1)	Draper 6'; Cadamarteri 41'; Street 49'; Okoro 60'; McKiernan 65'	Report		Stadium: Sincil Bank; Attendance: 3,055; Referee: Aaron Bannister

==== Group H ====
Pos	Div	Team	Pld	W	PW	PL	L	GF	GA	GD	Pts	Qualification
1	L1	Rotherham United	3	3	0	0	0	6	1	+5	9	Advance to Round 2
2	L2	Bradford City	3	1	0	1	1	5	3	+2	4	Advance to Round 2
3	L1	Mansfield Town	3	1	0	0	2	3	5	−2	3	
4	ACA	Newcastle United U21	3	0	1	0	2	3	8	−5	2	

Source: EFL

20 August 2024	Rotherham United	2–0	Mansfield Town	Rotherham
19:00 BST (UTC+1)	Hugill 3', 54'	Report		Stadium: New York Stadium; Attendance: 2,265; Referee: Scott Jackson

3 September 2024	Bradford City	2–2 (3–4 p)	Newcastle United U21	Bradford
19:30 BST (UTC+1)	Sanderson 42'; Cook 76'	Report	Parkinson 40'; Donaldson 90+2'	Stadium: Valley Parade; Attendance: 1,790; Referee: Dale Baines
	Penalties
	Walker (penalty scored); Smith (penalty scored); Pointon (penalty scored); Pattison (penalty missed); Cook (penalty missed)		(penalty scored) Parkinson; (penalty missed) Stanton; (penalty scored) Turner-Cooke; (penalty scored) Huntley; (penalty scored) Donaldson

17 September 2024	Mansfield Town	0–3	Bradford City	Mansfield
19:45 BST (UTC+1)		Report	Oliver 3'; Pointon 36'; Oduor 90+5'	Stadium: Quarry Lane Field Mill; Attendance: 1,594; Referee: James Westgate

8 October 2024	Rotherham United	3–1	Newcastle United U21	Rotherham
19:45 BST (UTC+1)	Hugill 20', 45+2'; Osong 82'	Report	Emerson 59'	Stadium: New York Stadium; Attendance: 1,613; Referee: Ruebyn Ricardo

29 October 2024	Mansfield Town	3–0	Newcastle United U21	Mansfield
19:45 GMT	Akins 14'; Quinn 29', 69'	Report		Stadium: Quarry Lane Field Mill; Attendance: 1,311; Referee: Thomas Bramall

19 November 2024	Bradford City	0–1	Rotherham United	Bradford
19:30 GMT		Report	McWilliams 5'	Stadium: Valley Parade; Attendance: 1,640; Referee: Jacob Miles

=== Southern section ===
==== Group A ====
Pos	Div	Team	Pld	W	PW	PL	L	GF	GA	GD	Pts	Qualification
1	L2	Walsall	3	2	1	0	0	5	1	+4	8	Advance to Round 2
2	L1	Birmingham City	3	2	0	1	0	12	2	+10	7	Advance to Round 2
3	ACA	Fulham U21	3	1	0	0	2	3	9	−6	3	
4	L1	Shrewsbury Town	3	0	0	0	3	1	9	−8	0	

Source: EFL

20 August 2024	Shrewsbury Town	1–2	Fulham U21	Shrewsbury
19:45 BST (UTC+1)	Nsiala 51'	Report	Osmand 60'; Gordon 88'	Stadium: New Meadow; Attendance: 1,206; Referee: Paul Marsden

3 September 2024	Birmingham City	1–1 (3–4 p)	Walsall	Birmingham
19:45 BST (UTC+1)	Klarer 84'	Report	Lakin 48'	Stadium: St. Andrew's; Attendance: 9,752; Referee: Sam Purkiss
	Penalties
	Bielik (penalty scored); Jutkiewicz (penalty scored); Paik Seung-ho (penalty missed); Stansfield (penalty scored); May (penalty missed)		(penalty scored) Allen; (penalty scored) Lakin; (penalty missed) Matt; (penalty scored) Jellis; (penalty scored) Cleary

17 September 2024	Walsall	1–0	Fulham U21	Walsall
19:45 BST (UTC+1)	Johnson 49'			Stadium: Bescot Stadium; Attendance: 875; Referee: Martin Woods

8 October 2024	Shrewsbury Town	0–4	Birmingham City	Shrewsbury
19:45 BST (UTC+1)		Report	Wright 8', 38'; Iwata 29'; Hansson 71'	Stadium: New Meadow; Attendance: 4,847; Referee: Jamie O'Connor

29 October 2024	Birmingham City	7–1	Fulham U21	Birmingham
19:45 GMT	Stansfield 17', 43'; Yokoyama 54', 74'; May 59'; Anderson 90+4'; Dykes 90+6'	Report	Godo 22'	Stadium: St. Andrew's; Attendance: 6,900; Referee: Dale Baines

12 November 2024	Walsall	3–0	Shrewsbury Town	Walsall
19:45 GMT	Cleary 53'; Hall 63'; Lowe 85'	Report		Stadium: Bescot Stadium; Attendance: 1,507; Referee: Zac Kennard-Kettle

==== Group B ====
Pos	Div	Team	Pld	W	PW	PL	L	GF	GA	GD	Pts	Qualification
1	L1	Wycombe Wanderers	3	2	0	0	1	7	5	+2	6	Advance to Round 2
2	L2	AFC Wimbledon	3	2	0	0	1	5	6	−1	6	Advance to Round 2
3	ACA	Brighton & Hove Albion U21	3	1	0	1	1	8	7	+1	4	
4	L1	Crawley Town	3	0	1	0	2	6	8	−2	2	

Source: EFL

20 August 2024	AFC Wimbledon	1–0	Wycombe Wanderers	Wimbledon
19:45 BST (UTC+1)	Bugiel 84'	Report		Stadium: Plough Lane; Attendance: 1,542; Referee: Scott Tallis

20 August 2024	Crawley Town	2–2 (4–3 p)	Brighton & Hove Albion U21	Crawley
19:45 BST (UTC+1)	Barker 13'; Papadopoulos 55'	Report	Peupion 10'; Duffus 84'	Stadium: Broadfield Stadium; Attendance: 1,545; Referee: Farai Hallam
	Penalties
	Bragg (penalty scored); Roles (penalty scored); Quitirna (penalty scored); Flint (penalty scored)		(penalty missed) Weir; (penalty scored) Howell; (penalty scored) Samuels; (penalty scored) Peupion; (penalty missed) Yalcouyé

17 September 2024	Wycombe Wanderers	5–3	Brighton & Hove Albion U21	High Wycombe
19:45 BST (UTC+1)	Lubala 13', 30', 36', 50'; Sadlier 27'	Report	Howell 45+3' (pen.), 80' (pen.); Ifill 56'	Stadium: Adams Park; Attendance: 487; Referee: Ben Atkinson

8 October 2024	Crawley Town	3–4	AFC Wimbledon	Crawley
19:45 BST (UTC+1)	Darcy 71' (pen.); Hepburn-Murphy 80'; Flint 87'	Report	Maycock 44'; Stevens 55'; Tilley 57'; Pigott 90+6'	Stadium: Broadfield Stadium; Attendance: 1,438; Referee: Alan Young

29 October 2024	AFC Wimbledon	0–3	Brighton & Hove Albion U21	Wimbledon
19:45 GMT		Report	Vickers 56'; Peupion 69'; Moulton 85'	Stadium: Plough Lane; Attendance: 1,066; Referee: Sam Mulhall

12 November 2024	Wycombe Wanderers	2–1	Crawley Town	High Wycombe
19:45 GMT	Hanlan 4'; Leahy 30'	Report	Showunmi 14'	Stadium: Adams Park; Attendance: 723; Referee: Scott Jackson

==== Group C ====
Pos	Div	Team	Pld	W	PW	PL	L	GF	GA	GD	Pts	Qualification
1	L1	Charlton Athletic	3	3	0	0	0	6	1	+5	9	Advance to Round 2
2	L1	Cambridge United	3	1	0	1	1	5	5	0	4	Advance to Round 2
3	ACA	Chelsea U21	3	1	0	0	2	3	6	−3	3	
4	L2	Bromley	3	0	1	0	2	5	7	−2	2	

Source: EFL

3 September 2024	Bromley	3–3 (5–4 p)	Cambridge United	Bromley
19:45 BST (UTC+1)	Dinanga 1', 23'; Olomola 90'	Report	Bennett 38'; Barton 60'; Longelo 68'	Stadium: Hayes Lane; Attendance: 1,120; Referee: James Durkin
	Penalties
	Arthurs (penalty scored); Charles (penalty scored); Topalloj (penalty scored); Odutayo (penalty scored); Olomola (penalty scored)		(penalty missed) Andrew; (penalty scored) Nlundulu; (penalty scored) Stokes; (penalty scored) Digby; (penalty scored) Okedina

17 September 2024	Cambridge United	1–2	Charlton Athletic	Cambridge
19:45 BST (UTC+1)	Nlundulu 44' (pen.)	Report	Edun 24'; Godden 30'	Stadium: Abbey Stadium; Attendance: 1,028; Referee: Carl Brook

24 September 2024	Bromley	2–3	Chelsea U21	Bromley
19:45 BST (UTC+1)	Amantchi 6'; Charles 81'	Report	McNeilly 3'; Vale 27', 77'	Stadium: Hayes Lane; Attendance: 1,250; Referee: Matthew Russell

29 October 2024	Charlton Athletic	3–0	Chelsea U21	Charlton
19:45 GMT	Leaburn 10', 52'; Campbell 90+4'	Report		Stadium: The Valley; Attendance: 2,004; Referee: Jamie O'Connor

5 November 2024	Cambridge United	1–0	Chelsea U21	Cambridge
19:00 GMT	Kaunda 74'	Report		Stadium: Abbey Stadium; Attendance: 1,340; Referee: Sam Mulhall

12 November 2024	Charlton Athletic	1–0	Bromley	Charlton
19:45 GMT	Leaburn 70'	Report		Stadium: The Valley; Attendance: 2,916; Referee: Ben Atkinson

==== Group D ====
Pos	Div	Team	Pld	W	PW	PL	L	GF	GA	GD	Pts	Qualification
1	L1	Peterborough United	3	3	0	0	0	8	2	+6	9	Advance to Round 2
2	L1	Stevenage	3	1	0	1	1	2	3	−1	4	Advance to Round 2
3	ACA	Crystal Palace U21	3	1	0	0	2	4	6	−2	3	
4	L2	Gillingham	3	0	1	0	2	3	6	−3	2	

Source: EFL

20 August 2024	Stevenage	1–0	Crystal Palace U21	Stevenage
19:45 BST (UTC+1)	Simpson 32'	Report		Stadium: The Lamex Stadium; Attendance: 903; Referee: Abigail Byrne

3 September 2024	Gillingham	1–2	Peterborough United	Gillingham
19:00 BST (UTC+1)	Nevitt 90+3'	Report	Jones 12'; Ihionvien 75'	Stadium: Priestfield Stadium; Attendance: 1,657; Referee: Craig Hicks

24 September 2024	Gillingham	1–3	Crystal Palace U21	Gillingham
19:00 BST (UTC+1)	Wyllie 80'		Umolu 25'; Umeh-Chibueze 39'; Mustapha 52'	Stadium: Priestfield Stadium; Attendance: 1,223

8 October 2024	Peterborough United	2–0	Stevenage	Peterborough
19:45 BST (UTC+1)	Mothersille 12'; Sparkes 43'	Report		Stadium: London Road Stadium; Attendance: 2,281; Referee: Stephen Parkinson

5 November 2024	Peterborough United	4–1	Crystal Palace U21	Peterborough
19:45 GMT	Odoh 49', 87'; Hayes 59'; Mills 80'	Report	Marsh 62'	Stadium: London Road Stadium; Attendance: 1,630; Referee: Abigail Byrne

12 November 2024	Stevenage	1–1 (4–5 p)	Gillingham	Stevenage
19:45 GMT	Kemp 68'	Report	Andrews 26'	Stadium: The Lamex Stadium; Attendance: 832; Referee: Scott Simpson
	Penalties
	Simpson (penalty missed); Aboh (penalty scored); Kemp (penalty scored); White (penalty scored); King (penalty scored)		(penalty scored) Clark; (penalty scored) Williams; (penalty scored) Nolan; (penalty scored) Sargent; (penalty scored) Wyllie

==== Group E ====
Pos	Div	Team	Pld	W	PW	PL	L	GF	GA	GD	Pts	Qualification
1	L2	Colchester United	3	2	0	1	0	6	2	+4	7	Advance to Round 2
2	L1	Leyton Orient	3	1	1	0	1	5	4	+1	5	Advance to Round 2
3	ACA	Arsenal U21	3	1	0	1	1	4	6	−2	4	
4	L2	Milton Keynes Dons	3	0	1	0	2	4	7	−3	2	

Source: EFL

3 September 2024	Leyton Orient	1–2	Arsenal U21	Leyton
19:00 BST (UTC+1)	Happe 26'	Report	Robinson 3'; Kabia 55'	Stadium: Brisbane Road; Attendance: 2,128; Referee: Stephen Parkinson

17 September 2024	Colchester United	2–1	Milton Keynes Dons	Colchester
19:00 BST (UTC+1)	Scully 41' (pen.); Kelleher 54'	Report	Wearne 34'	Stadium: Colchester Community Stadium; Attendance: 1,148; Referee: Scott Tallis

8 October 2024	Leyton Orient	1–1 (4–2 p)	Colchester United	Leyton
19:00 BST (UTC+1)	Obiero 30'	Report	Goodliffe 79'	Stadium: Brisbane Road; Attendance: 1,483; Referee: Abigail Byrne
	Penalties
	Agyei (penalty scored); O'Neill (penalty scored); Simpson (penalty scored); Brown (penalty missed); Kelman (penalty scored)		(penalty scored) Payne; (penalty scored) Scully; (penalty missed) Read; (penalty missed) Tovide

8 October 2024	Milton Keynes Dons	2–2 (3–1 p)	Arsenal U21	Milton Keynes
19:00 BST (UTC+1)	Harrison 26', 32'	Report	Annous 30'; Butler-Oyedeji 36'	Stadium: Stadium MK; Attendance: 2,427; Referee: Matthew Russell
	Penalties
	Lewington (penalty scored); Williams (penalty missed); Carroll (penalty scored); Leigh (penalty scored)		(penalty missed) Rosiak; (penalty missed) Oulad M'Hand; (penalty missed) Dudziak; (penalty scored) Kacurri

12 November 2024	Milton Keynes Dons	1–3	Leyton Orient	Milton Keynes
19:00 GMT	Hendry 33'	Report	Kelman 6'; Perkins 21'; Agyei 90+3'	Stadium: Stadium MK; Attendance: 1,127; Referee: Thomas Parsons

12 November 2024	Colchester United	3–0	Arsenal U21	Colchester
19:45 GMT	Hopper 16'; Anderson 43'; Egbo 50'	Report		Stadium: Colchester Community Stadium; Attendance: 4,265; Referee: Stephen Parkinson

==== Group F ====
Pos	Div	Team	Pld	W	PW	PL	L	GF	GA	GD	Pts	Qualification
1	L1	Burton Albion	3	2	0	0	1	9	5	+4	6	Advance to Round 2
2	L1	Northampton Town	3	2	0	0	1	7	5	+2	6	Advance to Round 2
3	L2	Notts County	3	2	0	0	1	3	3	0	6	
4	ACA	Leicester City U21	3	0	0	0	3	1	7	−6	0	

Source: EFL

20 August 2024	Burton Albion	3–1	Leicester City U21	Burton-on-Trent
19:00 BST (UTC+1)	Bennett 68'; Sweeney 83'; Orsi 84'	Report	Richards 57'	Stadium: Pirelli Stadium; Attendance: 473; Referee: Martin Woods

24 September 2024	Burton Albion	1–2	Notts County	Burton-on-Trent
19:00 BST (UTC+1)	Whitfield 87'	Report	Gordon 29'; Austin 54'	Stadium: Pirelli Stadium; Attendance: 1,199

8 October 2024	Notts County	0–2	Northampton Town	Nottingham
19:00 BST (UTC+1)		Report	Fox 22'; McCarron 59'	Stadium: Meadow Lane; Attendance: 1,614; Referee: Farai Hallam

5 November 2024	Northampton Town	3–0	Leicester City U21	Northampton
19:00 GMT	Eyoma 30'; Dobson 70', 81'	Report		Stadium: Sixfields Stadium; Attendance: 1,018; Referee: James Oldham

12 November 2024	Northampton Town	2–5	Burton Albion	Northampton
19:00 GMT	Dobson 2'; Waghorn 47'	Report	Akoto 13'; Williams 36'; Webster 39'; Donovan 49'; Whitfield 66'	Stadium: Sixfields Stadium; Attendance: 778; Referee: James Durkin

12 November 2024	Notts County	1–0	Leicester City U21	Nottingham
19:00 GMT	Scott 31'	Report		Stadium: Meadow Lane; Attendance: 1,178; Referee: Gareth Rhodes

==== Group G ====
Pos	Div	Team	Pld	W	PW	PL	L	GF	GA	GD	Pts	Qualification
1	L1	Exeter City	3	3	0	0	0	7	3	+4	9	Advance to Round 2
2	L2	Swindon Town	3	2	0	0	1	7	3	+4	6	Advance to Round 2
3	ACA	Tottenham Hotspur U21	3	0	1	0	2	4	7	−3	2	
4	L1	Bristol Rovers	3	0	0	1	2	5	10	−5	1	

Source: EFL

20 August 2024	Bristol Rovers	3–3 (5–6 p)	Tottenham Hotspur U21	Bristol
19:45 BST (UTC+1)	Hutchinson 8'; Shaw 56'; McCormick 76'	Report	Lankshear 27'; Moore 50'; Ajayi 70'	Stadium: Memorial Stadium; Attendance: 1,584; Referee: James Oldham
	Penalties
	Senior (penalty scored); Hutchinson (penalty scored); McCormick (penalty scored); Sotiriou (penalty scored); Taylor (penalty scored); Garrett (penalty missed)		(penalty scored) Moore; (penalty scored) Hall; (penalty scored) Williams; (penalty scored) Cassanova; (penalty scored) Abbott; (penalty scored) Irow

3 September 2024	Exeter City	2–1	Swindon Town	Exeter
19:00 BST (UTC+1)	Francis 65'; Aitchison 81'	Report	Cotterill 68'	Stadium: St James Park; Attendance: 1,485; Referee: Ross Martin

24 September 2024	Exeter City	2–0	Tottenham Hotspur U21	Exeter
19:00 BST (UTC+1)	Alli 56'; J. Richards 90+4'	Report		Stadium: St James Park; Attendance: 2,890; Referee: Craig Hicks

8 October 2024	Swindon Town	4–0	Bristol Rovers	Swindon
19:45 BST (UTC+1)	Glatzel 2', 12'; McGregor 30'; Ameen 35'	Report		Stadium: County Ground; Attendance: 1,306; Referee: Sam Mulhall

29 October 2024	Bristol Rovers	2–3	Exeter City	Bristol
19:00 GMT	Taylor 31'; Hutchinson 67'	Report	Bird 19'; Alli 49'; Mitchell 88'	Stadium: Memorial Stadium; Attendance: 1,257; Referee: Matthew Russell

5 November 2024	Swindon Town	2–1	Tottenham Hotspur U21	Swindon
19:00 GMT	Butterworth 54'; McGurk 73'	Report	Hall 25'	Stadium: County Ground; Attendance: 1,816; Referee: Matthew Russell

==== Group H ====
Pos	Div	Team	Pld	W	PW	PL	L	GF	GA	GD	Pts	Qualification
1	L2	Cheltenham Town	3	3	0	0	0	6	2	+4	9	Advance to Round 2
2	L1	Reading	3	2	0	0	1	6	2	+4	6	Advance to Round 2
3	L2	Newport County	3	1	0	0	2	2	5	−3	3	
4	ACA	West Ham United U21	3	0	0	0	3	2	7	−5	0	

Source: EFL

20 August 2024	Reading	3–1	West Ham United U21	Reading
19:00 BST (UTC+1)	Wareham 22'; Abrefa 31'; Sackey 85'	Report	Dean 38' (o.g.)	Stadium: Madejski Stadium; Attendance: 3,022; Referee: Stephen Parkinson

3 September 2024	Newport County	1–2	Cheltenham Town	Newport
19:00 BST (UTC+1)	Evans 33'	Report	Sohna 67'; Colwill 75'	Stadium: Rodney Parade; Attendance: 1,051; Referee: Matthew Russell

17 September 2024	Newport County	1–0	West Ham United U21	Newport
19:00 BST (UTC+1)	Greaves 83'	Report		Stadium: Rodney Parade; Attendance: 638; Referee: Oliver Mackey

29 October 2024	Cheltenham Town	3–1	West Ham United U21	Cheltenham
19:00 GMT	Dulson 28'; Taylor 57' (pen.); King 70'	Report	Simon-Swyer 60'	Stadium: Whaddon Road; Attendance: 1,318; Referee: Steven Copeland

5 November 2024	Cheltenham Town	1–0	Reading	Cheltenham
19:00 GMT	Pett 78'	Report		Stadium: Whaddon Road; Attendance: 1,598; Referee: James Durkin
Note: Originally scheduled for 8 October 2024, but was postponed due to a waterlogged pitch.

12 November 2024	Reading	3–0	Newport County	Reading
19:00 GMT	Knibbs 73', 87'; Wareham 75'	Report		Stadium: Madejski Stadium; Attendance: 1,870; Referee: Sam Mulhall

== Round of 32 ==
The draw for the Round of 32 took place on 22 November 2024, on Sky Sports News. The 38-penalty shootout between Blackpool and Aston Villa U21s on 17 December was the longest penalty shootout in English professional football history.

=== Northern section ===
10 December 2024	Chesterfield (4)	3–2	Wigan Athletic (3)	Chesterfield
19:00 GMT	Dobra 3'; Berry 78' (pen.); Markanday 87'	Report	McManaman 19'; Hugill 90+1'	Stadium: SMH Group Stadium; Attendance: 1,583; Referee: Greg Rollason

10 December 2024	Doncaster Rovers (4)	0–1	Port Vale (4)	Doncaster
19:00 GMT		Report	Harper 90+2'	Stadium: Keepmoat Stadium; Attendance: 1,396; Referee: Paul Marsden

10 December 2024	Morecambe (4)	0–1	Lincoln City (3)	Morecambe
19:00 GMT		Report	Cadamarteri 19'	Stadium: Mazuma Mobile Stadium; Attendance: 496; Referee: Michael Barlow

10 December 2024	Rotherham United (3)	3–2	Tranmere Rovers (4)	Rotherham
19:00 GMT	Clarke-Harris 24' (pen.); Jules 48'; Odoffin 90'	Report	Dennis 85'; Patrick 90+8'	Stadium: New York Stadium; Attendance: 1,093; Referee: Scott Tallis

10 December 2024	Stockport County (3)	2–3	Bradford City (4)	Stockport
19:00 GMT	Norwood 26'; Bailey 33'	Report	Kavanagh 13', 63'; Cook 15'	Stadium: Edgeley Park; Attendance: 1,433; Referee: Aaron Bannister

10 December 2024	Wrexham (3)	1–0	Crewe Alexandra (4)	Wrexham
19:00 GMT	James 79'	Report		Stadium: Racecourse Ground; Attendance: 3,119; Referee: Martin Woods

10 December 2024	Bolton Wanderers (3)	3–1	Huddersfield Town (3)	Horwich
19:45 GMT	Lolos 40'; Collins 83', 88'	Report	Dacres-Cogley 90' (o.g.)	Stadium: Toughsheet Community Stadium; Attendance: 1,802; Referee: Scott Jackson

17 December 2024	Blackpool (3)	1–1 (17–18 p)	Aston Villa U21	Blackpool
19:00 GMT	Embleton 46'	Report	Jimoh-Aloba 78'	Stadium: Bloomfield Road; Attendance: 1,055; Referee: John Mulligan
	Penalties
	Rhodes (penalty scored); Morgan (penalty missed); Fletcher (penalty scored); Ballard (penalty scored); Ashworth (penalty scored); Coulson (penalty scored); Norburn (penalty scored); Lawrence-Gabriel (penalty scored); Richardson (penalty scored); Sassi (penalty scored); O'Donnell (penalty scored); Rhodes (penalty scored); Morgan (penalty scored); Fletcher (penalty scored); Ballard (penalty scored); Ashworth (penalty scored); Coulson (penalty scored); Norburn (penalty scored); Lawrence-Gabriel (penalty missed)		(penalty scored) Taylor; (penalty scored) Alcock; (penalty missed) Borland; (penalty scored) Lynch; (penalty scored) Smith; (penalty scored) Swinkels; (penalty scored) Cotcher; (penalty scored) Hemmings; (penalty scored) Patterson; (penalty scored) Rowe; (penalty scored) Zych; (penalty scored) Taylor; (penalty scored) Alcock; (penalty scored) Borland; (penalty scored) Lynch; (penalty scored) Smith; (penalty scored) Swinkels; (penalty scored) Cotcher; (penalty scored) Hemmings

=== Southern section ===
10 December 2024	Burton Albion (3)	0–4	Stevenage (3)	Burton-on-Trent
19:00 GMT		Report	Freestone 6'; Simpson 54'; Aboh 78'; White 83'	Stadium: Pirelli Stadium; Attendance: 321; Referee: Richard Eley

10 December 2024	Charlton Athletic (3)	0–2	Leyton Orient (3)	Charlton
19:00 GMT		Report	Kelman 90+3'; Agyei 90+5'	Stadium: The Valley; Attendance: 1,336; Referee: Stephen Parkinson

10 December 2024	Cheltenham Town (4)	2–1	Cambridge United (3)	Cheltenham
19:00 GMT	Taylor 54'; Jude-Boyd 57'	Report	Stokes 45' (pen.)	Stadium: Whaddon Road; Attendance: 847; Referee: Dale Baines

10 December 2024	Walsall (4)	1–1 (4–2 p)	Reading (3)	Walsall
19:00 GMT	Johnson 90+7'	Report	Sackey 72'	Stadium: Bescot Stadium; Attendance: 1,501; Referee: Steven Copeland
	Penalties
	Adomah (penalty scored); Johnson (penalty scored); Daniels (penalty scored); Cleary (penalty scored)		(penalty missed) Wareham; (penalty scored) Holzman; (penalty missed) Wellens; (penalty scored) Kanu

10 December 2024	Wycombe Wanderers (3)	1–2	Swindon Town (4)	High Wycombe
19:00 GMT	Lubala 90+3'	Report	Kirkman 5'; Tshimanga 68'	Stadium: Adams Park; Attendance: 611; Referee: Farai Hallam

10 December 2024	Colchester United (4)	2–0	AFC Wimbledon (4)	Colchester
19:45 GMT	Taylor 6', 33'	Report		Stadium: Colchester Community Stadium; Attendance: 1,139; Referee: Oliver Mackey

10 December 2024	Exeter City (3)	1–2	Birmingham City (3)	Exeter
19:45 GMT	Sweeney 32'	Report	Harris 22'; Anderson 78'	Stadium: St James Park; Attendance: 1,986

17 December 2024	Peterborough United (3)	3–0	Northampton Town (3)	Peterborough
19:00 GMT	Jones 48'; De Havilland 52'; Odoh 65'	Report		Stadium: London Road Stadium; Attendance: 2,549; Referee: James Oldham

== Round of 16 ==
The draw for the Round of 16 took place on 14 December 2024, on Sky Sports News.

=== Northern section ===
14 January 2025	Lincoln City (3)	0–1	Bolton Wanderers (3)	Lincoln
19:00 GMT		Report	Collins 22'	Stadium: LNER Stadium; Attendance: 2,252; Referee: Thomas Parsons

14 January 2025	Chesterfield (4)	0–0 (3–4 p)	Rotherham United (3)	Chesterfield
19:00 GMT		Report		Stadium: SMH Group Stadium; Attendance: 3,517; Referee: Scott Oldham
	Penalties
	Banks (penalty scored); Dobra (penalty scored); Drummond (penalty missed); Cook (penalty scored); Oldaker (penalty missed)		(penalty scored) Clarke-Harris; (penalty scored) Nombe; (penalty scored) Odoffin; (penalty missed) Powell; (penalty scored) Humphreys

14 January 2025	Aston Villa U21	1–3	Bradford City (4)	Birmingham
19:30 GMT	Pierre 24'	Report	Kavanagh 9'; Shepherd 15'; Johnson 26'	Stadium: Villa Park; Attendance: 1,079; Referee: Ross Joyce

4 February 2025	Port Vale (4)	1–4	Wrexham (3)	Stoke-on-Trent
19:00 GMT	Curtis 1'	Report	Cannon 31'; Ashfield 48'; Lee 63'; Faal 82'	Stadium: Vale Park; Attendance: 1,621; Referee: Ben Toner
Note: Originally scheduled for 7 January 2025, but was postponed due to snow and ice.

=== Southern section ===
14 January 2025	Cheltenham Town (4)	2–1	Colchester United (4)	Cheltenham
19:00 GMT	Pett 3'; Miller 90+1'	Report	Taylor 45+3'	Stadium: Whaddon Road; Attendance: 1,084; Referee: David Rock

14 January 2025	Swindon Town (4)	1–2	Birmingham City (3)	Swindon
19:30 GMT	Smith 76'	Report	Yokoyama 49'; Smith 89' (o.g.)	Stadium: The County Ground; Attendance: 3,509; Referee: Edward Duckworth

14 January 2025	Peterborough United (3)	4–2	Walsall (4)	Peterborough
19:45 GMT	Lindgren 7', 31'; Mothersille 15' (pen.), 74'	Report	Johnson 30'; Gordon 90+5'	Stadium: London Road Stadium; Attendance: 2,133; Referee: Scott Simpson

21 January 2025	Leyton Orient (3)	0–1	Stevenage (3)	Leyton
19:00 GMT		Report	Cooper 25' (o.g.)	Stadium: Gaughan Group Stadium; Attendance: 1,558; Referee: Carl Brook

== Quarter-finals ==
The quarter-final draw was made on 18 January 2025.

=== Northern Section ===
4 February 2025	Rotherham United (3)	0–1	Bradford City (4)	Rotherham
19:30		Report	Smallwood 58' (pen.)	Stadium: New York Stadium; Attendance: 3,073; Referee: Adam Herczeg

11 February 2025	Wrexham (3)	1–0	Bolton Wanderers (3)	Wrexham
	Cannon 70'	Report		Stadium: Racecourse Ground; Attendance: 7,591; Referee: Ross Joyce

=== Southern Section ===
4 February 2025	Stevenage (3)	0–1	Birmingham City (3)	Stevenage
19:45		Report	Stansfield 83'	Stadium: Broadhall Way; Attendance: 2,812; Referee: Declan Bourne

5 February 2025	Peterborough United (3)	3–2	Cheltenham Town (4)	Peterborough
19:00	Kyprianou 24'; Odoh 52'; Jones 59'	Report	Thomas 34'; Miller 45+3'	Stadium: London Road Stadium; Attendance: 2,587; Referee: Scott Oldham

== Semi-finals ==
The semi-final draw was made on 8 February.

18 February 2025	Birmingham City (3)	2–1	Bradford City (4)	Birmingham
20:00	Stansfield 45+3'; Dykes 88'	Report	Pointon 52'	Stadium: St Andrew's; Attendance: 27,066; Referee: Scott Oldham

26 February 2025	Wrexham (3)	2–2 (2–4 p)	Peterborough United (3)	Wrexham
19:30	Faal 34'; Dobson 38'	Report	Mothersille 72'; Ihionvien 90+1'	Stadium: Racecourse Ground; Attendance: 9,258; Referee: Lewis Smith
	Penalties
	Mullin (penalty missed); Fletcher (penalty scored); Lee (penalty missed); Mendy (penalty scored)		(penalty scored) Ihionvien; (penalty missed) Mothersille; (penalty scored) De Havilland; (penalty scored) Mills; (penalty scored) Kyprianou

== Final ==
13 April 2025
15:00 BST

Birmingham City	0–2	Peterborough United
	Report	Mills 15'; Kyprianou 45'

Wembley Stadium, London
Attendance: 71,722
Referee: Ben Speedie
