= Liam Dulson =

English footballer

Personal information
- Full name: Liam James Dulson
- Date of birth: 30 January 2002 (age 24)
- Position: Forward

Team information
- Current team: Woking
- Number: 18

Youth career
- Stevenage
- West Ham United
- Tottenham Hotspur
- Chelsea
- 2010–2018: Watford
- Waltham Abbey

Senior career*
| Years | Team | Apps | (Gls) |
- Hoddesdon Town Reserves
- Royston Town Reserves
| 2021–2023 | Ware | 69 | (35) |
| 2023 | Potters Bar Town | 4 | (0) |
| 2023–2024 | Ware | 18 | (18) |
| 2024 | Bedford Town | 18 | (7) |
| 2024–2025 | Cheltenham Town | 29 | (2) |
| 2025–2026 | Maidenhead United | 39 | (14) |
| 2026– | Woking | 15 | (2) |
- * Club domestic league appearances and goals as of 20:28, 22 November 2026 (UTC)

Liam James Dulson (born 30 January 2002) is an English professional footballer who plays as a forward for National League club Woking.

== Career ==
Dulson spent his early career playing with Stevenage, West Ham United, Tottenham Hotspur and Chelsea, before signing for the Watford academy aged 8, staying there until he was 16. He was released for being too short, and he signed for Waltham Abbey under-16s. He then began playing senior football for Hoddesdon Town Reserves and Royston Town Reserves, before signing for Ware.

He later played for Potters Bar Town and Bedford Town, combining his non-league career with a job as a labourer, setting up his own landscaping business.

Dulson signed for Cheltenham Town in July 2024 on a two-year contract, scoring on his debut for the club. He lived with teammates including Arkell Jude-Boyd and Ethon Archer.

On 29 July 2025, Dulson signed for Maidenhead United on a permanent basis. He scored fourteen goals in 41 games before leaving the club at the end of the season after rejecting a new contract.

On 27 May 2026, Dulson agreed to join National League side, Woking on a two-year deal following his departure from Maidenhead United.

== Career statistics ==
As of match played 21 November 2026

Appearances and goals by club, season and competition
| Club | Season | League | | | FA Cup | | League Cup | | Other | | Total | |
| Club | Season | Division | Apps | Goals | Apps | Goals | Apps | Goals | Apps | Goals | Apps | Goals |
|---|---|---|---|---|---|---|---|---|---|---|---|---|
| Ware | 2021–22 | SFL Division One Central | 33 | 16 | 7 | 1 | — | | 6 (Note: One appearance in FA Trophy, two appearances and one goal in Herts Senior Cup, one appearance in Southern Football League Cup, two appearances and one goal in SFL Division One Central playoffs) | 2 | 46 | 19 |
| Ware | 2022–23 | SFL Division One Central | 36 | 19 | 1 | 0 | — | | 5 (Note: Two appearances and two goals in FA Trophy, one appearance and one goal in Herts Senior Cup, two appearances in SFL Division One Central playoffs) | 3 | 42 | 22 |
| Ware | Total | | 69 | 35 | 8 | 1 | 0 | 0 | 11 | 5 | 88 | 41 |
| Potters Bar Town | 2023–24 | Isthmian League Premier Division | 4 | 0 | 0 | 0 | — | | 0 | 0 | 4 | 0 |
| Ware | 2023–24 | SFL Division One Central | 18 | 18 | 3 | 1 | — | | 2 (Note: One appearance in FA Trophy, one appearance in Herts Senior Cup) | 0 | 23 | 19 |
| Bedford Town | 2023–24 | SFL Division One Central | 18 | 7 | 0 | 0 | — | | 2 (Note: Two appearances in SFL Division One Central playoffs) | 0 | 20 | 7 |
| Cheltenham Town | 2024–25 | League Two | 29 | 2 | 1 | 0 | 1 | 0 | 4 (Note: Appearance(s) in EFL Trophy) | 1 | 35 | 3 |
| Maidenhead United | 2025–26 | National League South | 39 | 14 | 1 | 0 | — | | 1 (Note: Appearances in FA Trophy) | 0 | 41 | 14 |
| Woking | 2026–27 | National League | 15 | 2 | 1 | 0 | — | | 4 (Note: Appearance(s) in National League Cup) | 2 | 20 | 4 |
| Career total | | | 192 | 78 | 14 | 2 | 1 | 0 | 24 | 8 | 230 | 88 |
