= 2024–25 Cheltenham Town F.C. season =

138th season in existence of Cheltenham Town FC

Cheltenham Town
2024–25 season
- Chairman: David Bloxham
- Manager: Michael Flynn
- Stadium: Whaddon Road
- League Two: 15th
- FA Cup: Second round
- EFL Cup: First round
- EFL Trophy: Quarter-finals
- Top goalscorer: League: George Miller (9 goals); All: George Miller (11 goals)

The 2024–25 season is the 138th season in the history of Cheltenham Town Football Club and their first season back in League Two since the 2020–21 season following relegation from League One in the previous season. In addition to the domestic league, the club also participated in the FA Cup, the EFL Cup, and the EFL Trophy.

== Transfers ==
=== In ===
Date	Pos.	Player	From	Fee	Ref.
1 July 2024 (Note: The transfer was announced on 14 June, and would become official on July 1 once his Newport County contract expired)	DM	Scot Bennett (ENG)	Newport County (WAL)	Free	
1 July 2024 (Note: The transfer was announced on 15 June, and would become official on July 1 once his Northampton Town contract expired)	LB	Ryan Haynes (ENG)	Northampton Town (ENG)	Free	
1 July 2024 (Note: The transfer was announced on 18 June, and would become official on July 1 once his Queens Park Rangers contract expired)	RB	Arkell Jude-Boyd (LCA)	Queens Park Rangers (ENG)	Free	
1 July 2024 (Note: The transfer was announced on 14 June, and would become official on July 1 once his AFC Wimbledon contract expired)	CM	Harry Pell (ENG)	AFC Wimbledon (ENG)	Free	
1 July 2024 (Note: The transfer was announced on 18 June, and would become official on July 1 once his Wrexham contract expired)	CM	Luke Young (ENG)	Wrexham (WAL)	Free	
3 July 2024	GK	Joe Day (ENG) (Note: Joined as a Player-Coach)	Newport County (WAL)	Free	
3 July 2024	GK	Owen Evans (WAL)	Walsall (ENG)	Free	
4 July 2024	CF	Liam Dulson (ENG)	Bedford Town (ENG)	Free	
5 July 2024	AM	Ethon Archer (ENG)	Torquay United (ENG)	Free	
18 July 2024	CM	Harrison Sohna (ENG)	Sunderland (ENG)	Free	
26 July 2024	CF	Ryan Bowman (ENG)	Shrewsbury Town (ENG)	Free	
5 August 2024	CB	Ibrahim Bakare (ENG)	Vancouver (CAN)	Free	
9 August 2024	CF	George Miller (ENG)	Doncaster Rovers (ENG)	Undisclosed	
1 January 2024 (Note: The transfer was announced on 31 December, and would become official on January 1 once the transfer window reopened)	RB	Darragh Power (IRL)	Waterford (IRL)	Free	
3 February 2025	CM	Tommy Backwell (ENG)	Bristol City (ENG)	Free	

=== Out ===
Date	Pos.	Player	To	Fee	Ref.
14 June 2024	CB	Lewis Freestone (ENG)	Stevenage (ENG)	Undisclosed	
28 June 2024	CM	Elliot Bonds (GUY)	Fleetwood Town (ENG)	Undisclosed	
2 July 2024	CF	Rob Street (ENG)	Lincoln City (ENG)	Undisclosed	
28 July 2024	CF	Aidan Keena (IRL)	St Patrick's Athletic (IRL)	Free	

=== Loaned in ===
Date	Pos.	Player	From	Date until	Ref.
19 July 2024	RB	Lewis Payne (ENG)	Southampton (ENG)	15 January 2025 (Note: On 15 January, Payne was recalled to Southampton)	
26 July 2024	CB	Levi Laing (ENG)	West Ham United (ENG)	3 January 2025 (Note: On 3 January, Laing was recalled to West Ham United)	
2 August 2024	CM	Joel Colwill (WAL)	Cardiff City (WAL)	10 January 2025 (Note: On 10 January, Colwill was recalled to Cardiff)	
23 August 2024	CB	Sam Stubbs (ENG)	Bradford City (ENG)	End of Season	
30 August 2024	CF	Manni Norkett (ENG)	Nottingham Forest (ENG)	2 January 2025	
30 August 2024	CB	Lewis Shipley (ENG)	Norwich City (ENG)	2 January 2025	
1 January 2025 (Note: The loan was announced on 31 December, and would become official on January 1 once the transfer window reopened)	CF	Ashley Hay (ENG)	Brentford (ENG)	End of Season	
8 January 2025	LB	Val Adedokun (IRL)	Brentford (ENG)	End of Season	
16 January 2025	CM	Tommy Backwell (ENG)	Bristol City (ENG)	3 February 2025 (Note: On 3 February, Backwell's loan from Bristol City was made permanent)	
17 January 2025	LW	Ethan Williams (ENG)	Manchester United (ENG)	End of Season	
3 February 2025	DM	Timothée Dieng (FRA)	Gillingham (ENG)	End of Season	

=== Loaned out ===
Date	Pos.	Player	To	Date until	Ref.
20 August 2024	CM	Brandon Liggett (ENG)	Salisbury (ENG)	17 September 2024	
1 September 2024	GK	Max Harris (ENG)	Weston-super-Mare (ENG)	End of Season	
2 January 2025	GK	Owen Evans (WAL)	Barnet (ENG)	End of Season	
20 January 2025	CM	Tom Pett (ENG)	Oldham Athletic (ENG)	End of Season	
23 January 2025	CM	Harrison Sohna (ENG)	Wealdstone (ENG)	End of Season	

=== Released / Out of Contract ===
Date	Pos.	Player	Subsequent club	Join date	Ref.
30 June 2024	LM	Will Ferry (IRL)	Dundee United (SCO)	1 July 2024	
30 June 2024	CF	George Lloyd (ENG)	Shrewsbury Town (ENG)	1 July 2024	
30 June 2024	RB	Sean Long (IRL)	Forest Green Rovers (ENG)	1 July 2024	
30 June 2024	GK	Jamie Pardington (ENG)	Lincoln City (ENG)	1 July 2024	
30 June 2024	CM	Liam Sercombe (ENG)	Forest Green Rovers (ENG)	1 July 2024	
30 June 2024	GK	Luke Southwood (ENG)	Bolton Wanderers (ENG)	1 July 2024	
30 June 2024	RB	Liam Smith (SCO)	Bohemian (IRL)	12 July 2024	
30 June 2024	CM	Greg Sloggett (IRL)	Hartlepool United (ENG)	15 July 2024	
30 June 2024	LB	Ben Williams (WAL)	Carlisle United (ENG)	10 August 2024	
30 June 2024	CM	Daniel Adshead (ENG)	Boston United (ENG)	12 December 2024	
30 June 2024	AM	Josh Harrop (ENG)			
30 June 2024	CM	James Olayinka (ENG)			
30 June 2024	RB	Adulai Sambu (POR)			
30 June 2024	CB	Curtis Davies (SLE)	Retired		

== Pre-season and friendlies ==
On 31 May, Cheltenham Town announced their initial pre-season plans, with matches scheduled against Bishop's Cleeve, Bath City, Evesham United and Northampton Town. Five days later, a fifth fixture was added against Plymouth Argyle. On June 10, another two fixtures were added to Town's schedule, against Hungerford Town and Bristol City.

Win Draw Loss Fixtures

5 July 2024 Friendly	Bishop's Cleeve	1–7	Cheltenham Town	Bishop's Cleeve
19:30 BST	Langworthy 60'	Report	Dulson 1', 12'; Trialist 10'; Trialist 47'; Trialist 74'; Trialist 87'; Trialist 89'	Stadium: Kayte Lane

9 July 2024 Friendly	Bath City	2–3	Cheltenham Town	Twerton
19:00 BST	Wanjau-Smith 44'; Wilson 62'	Report	Taylor 20' (pen.); Trialist 61'; King 70'	Stadium: Twerton Park

12 July 2024 Friendly	Evesham United	0–3	Cheltenham Town	Evesham
19:30 BST		Report	Jude-Boyd 54'; Taylor 64' (pen.); Keena 88'	Stadium: The Spiers & Hartwell Stadium

20 July 2024 Friendly	Cheltenham Town	1–5	Plymouth Argyle	Cheltenham
15:00 BST	Dulson 19'	Report	Cissoko 29'; Whittaker 31'; Tijani 35', 59'; Hardie 65'	Stadium: Whaddon Road; Attendance: 2,339; Referee: Sam Allison

23 July 2024 Friendly	Hungerford Town	3–0	Cheltenham Town	Hungerford
19:45 BST		Report		Stadium: Bulpit Lane

26 July 2024 Friendly	Cheltenham Town	0–3	Bristol City	Cheltenham
19:45 BST		Report	Armstrong 1'; Wells 4' (pen.); Sykes 84'	Stadium: Whaddon Road; Attendance: 2,233; Referee: Scott Tallis

3 August 2024 Friendly	Cheltenham Town	2–0	Northampton Town	Cheltenham
15:00 BST	Bowman 20', 22'	Report		Stadium: Whaddon Road; Attendance: 1,046; Referee: Scott Tallis

== Competitions ==
=== League Two ===
==== League table ====
Pos	Team	Pld	W	D	L	GF	GA	GD	Pts
13	Crewe Alexandra	46	15	17	14	49	48	+1	62
14	Fleetwood Town	46	15	15	16	60	60	0	60
15	Cheltenham Town	46	16	12	18	60	70	−10	60
16	Barrow	46	15	14	17	52	50	+2	59
17	Gillingham	46	14	16	16	41	46	−5	58

Source: EFL Official Website
Rules for classification: 1) Points; 2) Goal difference; 3) Number of goals scored; 4) Head-to-head results; 5) Wins; 6) Away goals; 7) Penalty points (sec 9.5); 8) 12-point sending off offences

==== Results summary ====
Overall								Home						Away					
Pld	W	D	L	GF	GA	GD	Pts	W	D	L	GF	GA	GD	W	D	L	GF	GA	GD
46	16	12	18	60	70	−10	60	10	6	7	32	31	+1	6	6	11	28	39	−11

Last updated: 4 May 2025.
Source: Soccerway

==== Results by round ====
Round	1	2	3	4	5	6	7	8	9	10	11	12	13	14	15	16	17	18	19	20	21	22	23	24	27	28	29	30	31	32	33	25^{1}	34	35	36	26^{2}	37	38	39	40	41	42	43	44
Ground	H	A	H	A	H	A	A	H	H	A	H	A	H	A	H	A	H	H	A	H	A	H	H	A	A	H	A	H	A	H	A	H	H	A	H	A	A	H	A	A	H	A	H	A
Result	W	L	L	L	W	L	D	L	W	L	L	W	D	W	D	L	W	D	D	W	D	W	L	D	L	W	L	W	D	W	W	D	D	L	L	W	D	L	L	L	L	W	D	W
Position	6	10	16	20	15	19	17	20	16	20	21	18	17	16	16	16	14	15	15	13	14	14	14	13	13	14	16	13	14	11	11	12	13	13	14	13	13	14	14	14	16	16	16	16
Points	3	3	3	3	6	6	7	7	10	10	10	13	14	17	18	18	21	22	23	26	27	30	30	31	31	34	34	37	38	41	44	45	46	46	46	49	50	50	50	50	50	53	54	57

Source: EFL
A = Away; H = Home; W = Win; D = Draw; L = Loss; P = Postponed
Notes:
- ^{1} Matchday 25 (vs. Walsall) was postponed due to a frozen pitch.
- ^{2} Matchday 26 (vs. AFC Wimbledon) was postponed due to a frozen pitch.

==== Matches ====
On 26 June, the League Two fixtures were announced.

Win Draw Loss Fixtures

10 August 2024 1	Cheltenham Town	3–2	Newport County	Cheltenham
15:00 BST	Colwill 22', 90+6'; Dulson 27'; Haynes (yellow card) 33'	Report	Brennan (yellow card) 14'; Baker-Richardson 31' (pen.), (yellow card) 80'; Greaves 43'; Wildig (yellow card) 60'	Stadium: Whaddon Road; Attendance: 4,613; Referee: Ruebyn Ricardo

17 August 2024 2	Grimsby Town	3–2	Cheltenham Town	Cleethorpes
15:00 BST	Davies 44', 90+3'; Vernam 51' (yellow card) 71'	Report	Bakare (yellow card) 36'; Payne (yellow card) 38'; Pett (yellow card) 43'; Young 61'; Bowman (yellow card) 77'; Taylor 82'; Bennett (yellow card) 90'	Stadium: Blundell Park; Attendance: 5,885; Referee: Elliot Bell

24 August 2024 3	Cheltenham Town	0–1	AFC Wimbledon	Cheltenham
15:00 BST	Bennett (yellow card) 28'	Report	Pigott 67'; Reeves (yellow card) 90+3'	Stadium: Whaddon Road; Attendance: 4,256; Referee: Stephen Parkinson

31 August 2024 4	Walsall	2–1	Cheltenham Town	Bescot
15:00 BST	Gordon (yellow card) 38'; Lowe 48'; Matt 66'; Jellis (yellow card) 76'; Lakin (yellow card) 86'; Okagbue (yellow card) 89'	Report	Stubbs (yellow card) 12'; Jude-Boyd (yellow card) 73'; Miller 85'	Stadium: Bescot Stadium; Attendance: 5,760; Referee: Paul Marsden

7 September 2024 5	Cheltenham Town	1–0	Harrogate Town	Cheltenham
15:00 BST	Haynes (yellow card) 71'; Bradbury 90+2'; Taylor (yellow card) 90+4'	Report	Folarin (yellow card) 64'	Stadium: Whaddon Road; Attendance: 3,594; Referee: Daniel Middleton

14 September 2024 6	Salford City	2–1	Cheltenham Town	Kersal
15:00 BST	Adelakun 60', 86'; Chesters (yellow card) 90+2'	Report	Archer 48'	Stadium: Moor Lane; Attendance: 2,347; Referee: Farai Hallam

21 September 2024 7	Chesterfield	1–1	Cheltenham Town	Chesterfield
12:30 BST	Naylor (yellow card) 21'; Markanday 27'; Tanton (yellow card) 53'; Oldaker (yellow card) 84'	Report	Jude-Boyd 53'; Stubbs (yellow card) 57'	Stadium: SMH Group Stadium; Attendance: 7,652; Referee: Ross Joyce
Note: Fixture was initially scheduled for a 15:00 kick-off, but was moved for live Sky Sports broadcast.

28 September 2024 8	Cheltenham Town	0–2	Fleetwood Town	Cheltenham
15:00 BST	Bennett (yellow card) 28'; Payne (yellow card) 50'	Report	Virtue 5', 51', (yellow card) 58'; Mayor (yellow card) 31'; Bonds (yellow card) 36'	Stadium: Whaddon Road; Attendance: 3,928; Referee: Carl Brook

1 October 2024 9	Cheltenham Town	2–1	Accrington Stanley	Cheltenham
19:45 BST	Colwill (yellow card) 19'; Norkett 69'; Bowman 80'; Shipley (yellow card) 88'; Bradbury (yellow card) 90+2'	Report	Batty (yellow card) 30'; Costelloe 39'; Khumbeni (yellow card) 67'	Stadium: Whaddon Road; Attendance: 2,976; Referee: Oliver Mackey

5 October 2024 10	Barrow	2–1	Cheltenham Town	Barrow-in-Furness
15:00 BST	Acquah 47'; Kouyaté (yellow card) 73'; Dallas 86'; Stanway (yellow card) 90+5'	Report	Bowman 41'; Willcox (yellow card) 66'	Stadium: Holker Street; Attendance: 3,518; Referee: Simon Mather

12 October 2024 11	Cheltenham Town	2–3	Swindon Town	Cheltenham
15:00 BST	Shipley (yellow card) 43'; Miller (yellow card) 59', (goal) 63'; Archer 78'	Report	Ofoborh (yellow card) 14'; Cox 30', (yellow card) 45+2'; Wright 34', (yellow card) 90+5'; McGregor 47'; Longelo (yellow card) 85'; Barden (yellow card) 90'	Stadium: Whaddon Road; Attendance: 5,561; Referee: Dale Baines

19 October 2024 12	Colchester United	1–2	Cheltenham Town	Colchester
15:00 BST	Taylor 27'; Iandolo (yellow card) 71'	Report	Thomas 5', 45+2'; Day (yellow card) 90'	Stadium: Colchester Community Stadium; Attendance: 4,031; Referee: Ben Speedie

22 October 2024 13	Cheltenham Town	1–1	Bradford City	Cheltenham
19:45 BST	Payne (yellow card) 5'; Young 15'; Colwill (yellow card) 26'; Sohna (yellow card) 82'	Report	Byrne 8'; Diabate (yellow card) 82'	Stadium: Whaddon Road; Attendance: 3,404; Referee: Jamie O'Connor

26 October 2024 14	Carlisle United	0–1	Cheltenham Town	Carlisle
15:00 BST	Robson (yellow card) 46'; Neal (yellow card) 69'; Mellish (yellow card) 82'; Sadi (yellow card) 83'	Report	Archer 17'; Stubbs (yellow card) 29'; Young (yellow card) 55'; Payne (yellow card) 90+1'	Stadium: Brunton Park; Attendance: 6,064; Referee: Scott Jackson

9 November 2024 15	Cheltenham Town	1–1	Bromley	Cheltenham
15:00 GMT	Archer 51'	Report	Jenkinson (yellow card) 12' (yellow-red card) 24'; Arthurs (yellow card) 71'; Sowunmi 82'	Stadium: Whaddon Road; Attendance: 3,786; Referee: Scott Oldham

16 November 2024 16	Milton Keynes Dons	3–2	Cheltenham Town	Denbigh
15:00 GMT	Gilbey 22'; Thompson-Sommers (yellow card) 34'; Harrison 75'; Maguire 86'	Report	Young 6'; Miller 13'	Stadium: Stadium MK; Attendance: 7,333; Referee: Jacob Miles

22 November 2024 17	Cheltenham Town	1–0	Tranmere Rovers	Cheltenham
19:45 GMT	Payne (yellow card) 55'; Colwill 89'	Report	O'Connor (yellow card) 48'; Norris (yellow card) 68'; Davies (yellow card) 69'	Stadium: Whaddon Road; Attendance: 3,939; Referee: Ruebyn Ricardo
Note: Fixture was initially scheduled for 23 November, but was moved for a day earlier.

3 December 2024 18	Cheltenham Town	1–1	Port Vale	Cheltenham
19:45 GMT	Miller 53'; Bakare (yellow card) 69'; Day (yellow card) 90+5'	Report	Heneghan (yellow card) 11'; Croasdale (yellow card) 85'; Curtis 90+4'	Stadium: Whaddon Road; Attendance: 3,245; Referee: Scott Tallis

7 December 2024 19	Doncaster Rovers	2–2	Cheltenham Town	Doncaster
15:00 GMT	McGrath (yellow card) 26'; Hurst (yellow card) 34'; Broadbent 55'; Molyneux 75'	Report	Bailey 15' (o.g.); Archer 56'; Kinsella (yellow card) 65'	Stadium: Eco-Power Stadium; Attendance: 6,259; Referee: Scott Simpson

14 December 2024 20	Cheltenham Town	2–0	Morecambe	Cheltenham
15:00 GMT	Thomas (yellow card) 26'; Jude-Boyd 33'; Bakare (yellow card) 64'; Miller 74'	Report	Macadam (yellow card) 64'; Williams (yellow card) 83'	Stadium: Whaddon Road; Attendance: 3,371; Referee: Sunny Singh Gill

20 December 2024 21	Gillingham	2–2	Cheltenham Town	Gillingham
19:45 GMT	Clarke 24'; Lapslie 68'	Report	Jude-Boyd (yellow card) 32'; Young 36'; Miller 60'; Bakare (yellow card) 90+1'	Stadium: Priestfield Stadium; Attendance: 5,938; Referee: Carl Brook
Note: Fixture was initially scheduled for 21 December, but was moved to allow an extra days recovery between matches.

26 December 2024 22	Cheltenham Town	2–1	Crewe Alexandra	Cheltenham
15:00 GMT	Colwill 70', 83'; Bowman (yellow card) 90+3'	Report	Holíček (yellow card) 34'; Connolly (yellow card) 51'; Lankester 56'; Tracey (yellow card) 68'; Williams (yellow card) 74'; Cooney (yellow card) 75'	Stadium: Whaddon Road; Attendance: 5,261; Referee: Alan Young

29 December 2024 23	Cheltenham Town	3–5	Notts County	Cheltenham
15:00 GMT	Stubbs 4'; Bowman 47'; Colwill 60'; Payne (yellow card) 78'	Report	Jatta 26', 90+3'; Palmer (yellow card) 28'; Martin 39'; Abbott 58'; Austin 62'; Hinchy (yellow card) 73'	Stadium: Whaddon Road; Attendance: 5,430; Referee: Andrew Humphries

1 January 2025 24	Port Vale	0–0	Cheltenham Town	Burslem
15:00 GMT	Hall (yellow card) 12'; Croasdale (yellow card) 90+4'	Report	Bennett (yellow card) 57'	Stadium: Vale Park; Attendance: 5,873; Referee: James Bell

17 January 2025 27	Harrogate Town	2–0	Cheltenham Town	Harrogate
19:45 GMT	Young 34' (o.g.); Bennett 56' (o.g.)	Report	Kinsella (yellow card) 20'	Stadium: Wetherby Road; Attendance: 2,522; Referee: Ross Joyce
Note: Fixture was initially scheduled for 18 January, but was brought forward.

25 January 2025 28	Cheltenham Town	2–1	Salford City	Cheltenham
15:00 GMT	Backwell 31'; Day (yellow card) 41'; Thomas 80'	Report	Shephard (yellow card) 48'; Stockton (yellow card) 90'; Tilt 90+5'	Stadium: Whaddon Road; Attendance: 4,187; Referee: Anthony Backhouse

28 January 2024 29	Accrington Stanley	0–0	Cheltenham Town	Accrington
19:45 GMT		Report		Stadium: Crown Ground; Attendance: 1,605; Referee: Paul Marsden

1 February 2025 30	Cheltenham Town	1–0	Chesterfield	Cheltenham
12:30 GMT	Kinsella (yellow card) 61'; Thomas (yellow card) 69'; Jude-Boyd 90+2'	Report	Duffy (yellow card) 8'; Olakigbe (yellow card) 45'; Grimes (yellow card) 66'	Stadium: Whaddon Road; Attendance: 3,869; Referee: Jacob Miles
Note: Fixture was initially scheduled for a 15:00 kick-off, but was moved for live Sky Sports broadcasting.

8 February 2025 31	Fleetwood Town	2–0	Cheltenham Town	Fleetwood
15:00 GMT	Virtue 44'; Cover (yellow card) 74'; Rooney (yellow card) 89'; Helm 90+2'; Bennett (yellow card) 90+4'	Report	Stubbs (yellow card) 62'	Stadium: Highbury Stadium; Attendance: 2,257; Referee: Aaron Bannister

15 February 2025 32	Cheltenham Town	3–2	Barrow	Cheltenham
15:00 GMT	Bennett (yellow card) 41'; Taylor 60', 70'; Hay 76'	Report	Foley 32'; Whitfield 46'; Farman (yellow card) 62'	Stadium: Whaddon Road; Attendance: 4,404; Referee: Greg Rollason

22 February 2025 33	Newport County	0–3	Cheltenham Town	Newport
15:00 GMT			Taylor 30'; Williams 53'; Archer 82'	Stadium: Rodney Parade; Attendance: 4,257; Referee: Jeremy Simpson

25 February 2025 25	Cheltenham Town	2–2	Walsall	Cheltenham
19:45 GMT	Miller 90'; Thomas 90+3'		Harrison 1'; Adomah 79'	Stadium: Whaddon Road; Attendance: 4,454; Referee: Michael Barlow
Note: Fixture was initially scheduled for a 15:00 kick-off, but was moved for live Sky Sports broadcasting. The match was then postponed on January 4, due to a frozen pitch.

1 March 2025 34	Cheltenham Town	1–1	Grimsby Town	Cheltenham
15:00 GMT	Miller (penalty missed) 24'; Williams 26'; Jude-Boyd (yellow card) 82'	Report	Green (yellow card) 13'; Hume (yellow card) 22'; Rodgers 53'; SvanÞórsson (yellow card) 85'	Stadium: Whaddon Road; Attendance: 4,473; Referee: Rob Massey-Ellis

4 March 2025 35	Bradford City	3–0	Cheltenham Town	Bradford
19:45 GMT	Lapslie 31', 53'; Mellon 60'; Kavanagh (yellow card) 84'; Shepherd (yellow card) 88'; Huntington (yellow card) 90+4'	Report	Taylor (yellow card) 27'; Thomas (yellow card) 80'; Dulson (yellow card) 88'	Stadium: Valley Parade; Attendance: 15,229; Referee: Zac Kennard-Kettle

8 March 2025 36	Cheltenham Town	0–1	Colchester United	Cheltenham
15:00 GMT	Dieng (yellow card) 71'	Report	Tucker (yellow card) 52'; Anderson 69'; McDonnell (yellow card) 80'; Macey (yellow card) 90+5'	Stadium: Whaddon Road; Attendance: 3,954; Referee: Simon Mather

11 March 2025 26	AFC Wimbledon	1–2	Cheltenham Town	Wimbledon
19:45 GMT	Lewis (yellow card) 22'; Browne 37'	Report	Hay 24'; Taylor 79'	Stadium: Plough Lane; Attendance: 8,114; Referee: Scott Jackson
Note: Fixture was originally scheduled for 11 January, but was postponed due to a frozen pitch.

15 March 2024 37	Swindon Town	3–3	Cheltenham Town	Swindon
12:30 GMT	Wright 45+3'; Tshimanga 67' (pen.), (yellow card) 79'; Clarke (yellow card) 71', (goal) 88'	Report	Thomas 8'; Stubbs (yellow card) 34'; Dieng 48', (yellow card) 79'; Wright 54' (o.g.); Adedokun (yellow card) 58'; Bradbury (yellow card) 63' (yellow-red card) 66'	Stadium: County Ground; Attendance: 8,556; Referee: Oliver Yates
Note: Fixture was initially scheduled for a 15:00 kick-off, but was moved for live Sky Sports broadcasting.

22 March 2024 38	Cheltenham Town	0–1	Milton Keynes Dons	Cheltenham
15:00 GMT	Jude-Boyd (yellow card) 87'	Report	Sanders 9'	Stadium: Whaddon Road; Attendance: 4,283; Referee: Darren Drysdale

28 March 2024 39	Tranmere Rovers	2–0	Cheltenham Town	Birkenhead
19:45 GMT	Dennis 25'; Turnbull (yellow card) 30'; Norman 90+3'	Report	Thomas (yellow card) 23'; Williams (yellow card) 36'; Dieng (yellow card) 67'	Stadium: Prenton Park; Attendance: 6,650; Referee: Ross Joyce
Note: Fixture was initially scheduled for 23 November, but was moved for a day earlier.

1 April 2025 40	Morecambe	2–0	Cheltenham Town	Morecambe
19:45 BST	Garner 66'; Angol 74'	Report	Jude-Boyd (yellow card) 57'; Bakare (yellow card) 72'	Stadium: Mazuma Mobile Stadium; Attendance: 2,502; Referee: Richard Eley

5 April 2025 41	Cheltenham Town	0–2	Doncaster Rovers	Cheltenham
12:30 BST	Dieng (yellow card) 30' (yellow-red card) 56'; Backwell (yellow card) 33'	Report	Wood (yellow card) 45+1'; Sbarra (yellow card) 88'; Sterry 89'; Street 90+5'	Stadium: Whaddon Road; Attendance: 3,897; Referee: Carl Brook
Note: Fixture was initially scheduled for a 15:00 kick-off, but was moved for live Sky Sports broadcasting.

10 April 2025 42	Crewe Alexandra	2–3	Cheltenham Town	Crewe
20:00 BST	Williams (yellow card) 34'; Hemmings 45' (pen.); Agius 90+5'	Report	Miller 22'; Haynes (penalty missed) 33'; Bennett (yellow card) 73'; Thomas 78'; Dulson 86'	Stadium: Gresty Road; Attendance: 4,939; Referee: Declan Bourne
Note: Fixture was initially scheduled for 12 April, but was moved for live Sky Sports broadcasting.

18 April 2025 43	Cheltenham Town	1–1	Gillingham	Cheltenham
15:00 BST	Stubbs 22'; Taylor (yellow card) 66'	Report	Morgan 2'; Hutton (yellow card) 57'; Nevitt (yellow card) 76'	Stadium: Whaddon Road; Attendance: 4,702; Referee: Graham Scott

21 April 2025 44	Notts County	1–2	Cheltenham Town	Nottingham
13:00 BST	Abbott (yellow card) 42'; Jatta 45+1', (yellow card) 45+2'	Report	Haynes (yellow card) 39'; Thomas 75'; Archer 89'; Jude-Boyd (yellow card) 90+2'	Stadium: Meadow Lane; Attendance: 10,642; Referee: James Durkin

26 April 2025 45	Cheltenham Town	3–2	Carlisle United	Cheltenham
15:00 BST	Thomas 33' (pen.); Hay 45'; Jude-Boyd (yellow card) 81'; Miller 90+3'		Dennis (yellow card) 6' (goal) 29'; Breeze (yellow card) 32'; Hayden (yellow card) 33'; Kelly 73'	Stadium: Whaddon Road; Attendance: 4,963; Referee: Tom Nield

3 May 2025 46	Bromley	3–0	Cheltenham Town	Bromley
15:00 BST	Cheek 26' (pen.), 53'; Kabamba 45+3'; Kader (yellow card) 89'	Report	Backwell (yellow card) 24'; Thomas (yellow card) 59'; Archer (yellow card) 90+5'	Stadium: Hayes Lane; Attendance: 2,818; Referee: Stephen Parkinson

=== FA Cup ===
Cheltenham Town were drawn away to Rotherham United in the first round. In the second round they were drawn away again, this time against Salford City.

Win Draw Loss Fixtures

2 November 2024 First round	Rotherham United	1–3	Cheltenham Town	Rotherham
15:00 GMT	Wilks 37'; Powell (yellow card) 46'; Odoffin (yellow card) 71'	Report	Kinsella (yellow card) 21'; Colwill 36', 45'; Archer 58'; Young (yellow card) 60'	Stadium: New York Stadium; Attendance: 2,770; Referee: Adam Herczeg

30 November 2024 Second round	Salford City	2–0	Cheltenham Town	Kersal
15:00 GMT	Okoronkwo 20'; Stockton 22' (pen.); Taylor (yellow card) 24'; Lund (yellow card) 52'; Austerfield (yellow card) 56'; N'Mai (yellow card) 74'	Report	Taylor (penalty missed) 70'; Stubbs (yellow card) 86'; Jude-Boyd (yellow card) 90+10'	Stadium: Moor Lane; Attendance: 1,968; Referee: Martin Coy

=== EFL Cup ===
On 27 June, the draw for the first round was made, with Cheltenham being drawn away against Plymouth Argyle.

Win Draw Loss Fixtures

14 August 2024 First round	Plymouth Argyle	3–0	Cheltenham Town	Plymouth
19:45 BST	Waine 62'; Hardie 81'; Bundu 84'; Szűcs (yellow card) 86'	Report	Pett (yellow card) 19'; Payne (yellow card) 61'	Stadium: Home Park

=== EFL Trophy ===
In the group stage, Cheltenham were drawn into Southern Group H alongside Newport County, Reading and West Ham United. Cheltenham were then drawn at home to Cambridge United in the round of 32, Colchester United in the round of 16 and away to Peterborough United in the quarter-finals.

==== Group stage ====
Pos	Div	Team	Pld	W	PW	PL	L	GF	GA	GD	Pts	Qualification
1	L2	Cheltenham Town	3	3	0	0	0	6	2	+4	9	Advance to Round 2
2	L1	Reading	3	2	0	0	1	6	2	+4	6	Advance to Round 2
3	L2	Newport County	3	1	0	0	2	2	5	−3	3	
4	ACA	West Ham United U21	3	0	0	0	3	2	7	−5	0	

Source: EFL

Win Draw Loss Fixtures

3 September 2024 Group stage	Newport County	1–2	Cheltenham Town	Newport
19:00 BST	Jameson (yellow card) 21'; Evans 33'; Carney (red card) 43'	Report	Taylor (yellow card) 29'; Sohna 67'; Colwill 75'; Kinsella (yellow card) 76'	Stadium: Rodney Parade; Attendance: 1,051; Referee: Matthew Russell

29 October 2024 Group stage	Cheltenham Town	3–1	West Ham United U21	Cheltenham
19:00 GMT	Sohna (yellow card) 9'; Dulson 28'; Colwill (yellow card) 50'; Taylor 57' (pen.); King 70'; Bowman (yellow card) 90+6'	Report	Robinson (yellow card) 55'; Simon-Swyer 60'	Stadium: Whaddon Road; Referee: Steven Copeland

5 November 2024 Group stage	Cheltenham Town	1–0	Reading	Cheltenham
19:00 GMT	Colwill (yellow card) 70'; Pett 78'; Liggett (yellow card) 90'; Shipley (yellow card) 90+4'	Report	Akande (yellow card) 46'	Stadium: Whaddon Road; Attendance: 1,598; Referee: James Durkin
Note: Fixture was originally scheduled for 8 October, but was postponed due to a waterlogged pitch

==== Knockout stages ====
10 December 2024 Round of 32	Cheltenham Town	2–1	Cambridge United	Cheltenham
19:00 GMT	Taylor 54'; Jude-Boyd 57'	Report	Stokes 45' (pen.); Watts (yellow card) 60'; Rossi (yellow card) 67'; O'Riordan (yellow card) 78'	Stadium: Whaddon Road; Attendance: 847; Referee: Dale Baines

14 January 2025 Round of 16	Cheltenham Town	2–1	Colchester United	Cheltenham
19:00 GMT	Pett 3'; Jude-Boyd (yellow card) 34'; Archer (yellow card) 76'; Thomas (yellow card) 79'; Miller 90+1'	Report	Kelleher (yellow card) 28'; Taylor 45+3'; Payne (yellow card) 61'	Stadium: Whaddon Road; Referee: David Rock

5 February 2025 Quarter-finals	Peterborough United	3–2	Cheltenham Town	Peterborough
19:00 GMT	Kyprianou 24'; Odoh 52'; Jones 69'	Report	Thomas 34'; Miller 45+3'; Bradbury (yellow card) 48'; Adedokun (yellow card) 66'; Stubbs (yellow card) 71'; Jude-Boyd (yellow card) 73'	Stadium: London Road Stadium; Attendance: 2,587; Referee: Scott Oldham

== Statistics ==
=== Appearances and goals ===
As of match played 21 April 2025

Players with no appearances are not included on the list
Italics indicate a loaned in player

No.	Pos	Nat	Player	Total		League Two		FA Cup		EFL Cup		EFL Trophy	
No.	Pos	Nat	Player	Apps	Goals	Apps	Goals	Apps	Goals	Apps	Goals	Apps	Goals
1	GK	(Wales) WAL	Owen Evans	11	0	11+0	0	0+0	0	0+0	0	0+0	0
2	DF	(Saint Lucia) LCA	Arkell Jude-Boyd	39	4	27+5	3	0+2	0	0+1	0	3+1	1
3	DF	(England) ENG	Ryan Haynes	13	0	9+2	0	0+0	0	1+0	0	1+0	0
4	MF	(Republic of Ireland) IRL	Liam Kinsella	42	0	32+4	0	2+0	0	0+0	0	4+0	0
5	MF	(France) FRA	Timothée Dieng	14	1	8+5	1	0+0	0	0+0	0	0+1	0
6	DF	(England) ENG	Tom Bradbury	44	1	37+1	1	2+0	0	0+0	0	4+0	0
8	MF	(England) ENG	Luke Young	39	4	33+1	4	2+0	0	0+1	0	2+0	0
9	FW	(England) ENG	Matty Taylor	43	7	10+25	5	0+2	0	1+0	0	4+1	2
10	FW	(England) ENG	George Miller	44	10	26+12	8	2+0	0	0+1	0	2+1	2
11	FW	(England) ENG	Ashley Hay	21	2	8+11	2	0+0	0	0+0	0	1+1	0
12	FW	(England) ENG	Ryan Bowman	22	3	8+10	3	0+1	0	0+0	0	1+2	0
14	FW	(England) ENG	Liam Dulson	33	3	6+21	2	0+1	0	1+0	0	3+1	1
15	FW	(England) ENG	Jordan Thomas	46	8	30+8	7	2+0	0	1+0	0	2+3	1
16	FW	(England) ENG	Ethan Williams	16	2	8+8	2	0+0	0	0+0	0	0+0	0
17	MF	(England) ENG	Scot Bennett	29	0	25+1	0	2+0	0	0+0	0	1+0	0
18	DF	(England) ENG	Ibrahim Bakare	33	0	17+11	0	0+0	0	1+0	0	3+1	0
19	MF	(England) ENG	Harrison Sohna	12	1	6+2	0	0+0	0	1+0	0	3+0	1
21	GK	(England) ENG	Joe Day	42	0	33+0	0	2+0	0	1+0	0	6+0	0
22	MF	(England) ENG	Ethon Archer	51	7	40+4	7	2+0	0	1+0	0	3+1	0
23	DF	(Republic of Ireland) IRL	Val Adedokun	17	0	11+4	0	0+0	0	0+0	0	1+1	0
24	DF	(Republic of Ireland) IRL	Darragh Power	12	0	5+5	0	0+0	0	0+0	0	0+2	0
25	DF	(England) ENG	Sam Stubbs	44	2	39+0	2	2+0	0	0+0	0	3+0	0
26	MF	(England) ENG	Tommy Backwell	12	1	8+3	1	0+0	0	0+0	0	1+0	0
29	FW	(England) ENG	Tom King	4	1	0+3	0	0+0	0	0+0	0	0+1	1
30	MF	(England) ENG	Freddy Willcox	5	0	0+2	0	0+0	0	0+1	0	2+0	0
34	MF	(England) ENG	Tom Pett	27	2	5+15	0	0+1	0	1+0	0	5+0	2
35	MF	(England) ENG	Brandon Liggett	2	0	0+0	0	0+0	0	0+0	0	2+0	0
38	MF	(England) ENG	Harry Tustin	1	0	0+0	0	0+0	0	0+0	0	0+1	0
Player(s) who featured whilst on loan but returned to parent club during the season:
5	DF	(England) ENG	Levi Laing	8	0	3+3	0	0+0	0	1+0	0	1+0	0
11	FW	(England) ENG	Manni Norkett	9	1	2+3	1	0+1	0	0+0	0	3+0	0
16	MF	(Wales) WAL	Joel Colwill	28	9	20+2	6	2+0	2	0+1	0	2+1	1
23	DF	(England) ENG	Lewis Shipley	10	0	5+3	0	0+0	0	0+0	0	2+0	0
27	DF	(England) ENG	Lewis Payne	21	0	12+4	0	2+0	0	1+0	0	1+1	0
