= Lewis Payne (footballer) =

English footballer (born 2004)

Personal information
- Full name: Lewis James Payne
- Date of birth: 30 May 2004 (age 22)
- Place of birth: Surrey, England
- Height: 1.78 m (5 ft 10 in)
- Position: Right-back

Team information
- Current team: Harrogate Town
- Number: 2

Youth career
- –2022: Southampton

Senior career*
Years	Team	Apps	(Gls)
2022–2025	Southampton	0	(0)
2023	→ Eastleigh (loan)	2	(0)
2023–2024	→ Newport County (loan)	31	(1)
2024–2025	→ Cheltenham Town (loan)	17	(0)
2025–2026	Morecambe	33	(4)
2026–	Harrogate Town	7	(2)
- * Club domestic league appearances and goals as of 06:20, 15 November 2026 (UTC)

Lewis James Payne (born 30 May 2004) is an English professional footballer who plays as a right-back for National League club Harrogate Town.

Payne is a product of the Southampton academy and made his professional debut for the club in August 2022. He had loan spells with Eastleigh, Newport County and Cheltenham Town. Payne joined Morecambe in September 2025 before joining Harrogate Town in July 2026.

== Career ==
=== Southampton ===
Payne signed his first professional contract with Southampton in November 2021. On 23 August 2022, he made his professional debut in the 3–0 win over Cambridge United in the EFL Cup, providing the assist for the first goal.

On 31 January 2023, Payne signed for National League club Eastleigh until the end of the season. On 3 March 2023, Payne returned to Southampton following the termination of his loan spell.

On 11 August 2023, Payne joined Newport County on a season-long loan. He made his debut for Newport on 12 August 2023 as a second-half substitute in the 4–0 EFL League Two win against Doncaster Rovers. On 12 December 2023, Payne scored his first goal for Newport in a 4–1 FA Cup third round victory against Barnet.

On 19 July 2024, he joined Cheltenham Town on a season-long loan. He made his debut for the club on 10 August 2024 in a 3–2 victory against Newport County. On 15 January 2025, Payne was recalled from loan and returned to Southampton.

On 25 June 2025, Southampton confirmed that Payne would be released following the expiry of his contract.

=== Morecambe ===
On 12 September 2025, Payne signed for Morecambe. He made his debut for the club on 20 September in a 4–3 victory against Wealdstone. On 30 September, Payne scored his first goal for the club in a 5–2 home defeat against Gateshead. During a 3–2 away victory against Wealdstone on 3 March 2026, he received a red card following a second bookable offence. On 3 April, Payne scored a brace in a 4–2 away victory against Rochdale.

=== Harrogate Town ===
On 2 July 2026, he joined Harrogate Town.

== Career statistics ==
As of match played 14 November 2026

Appearances and goals by club, season and competition
Club	Season	League			National Cup		League Cup		Other		Total	
Club	Season	Division	Apps	Goals	Apps	Goals	Apps	Goals	Apps	Goals	Apps	Goals
Southampton U23	2021–22	—	—		—		—		3 (Note: Appearances in the EFL Trophy)	0	3	0
Southampton U23	2022–23	—	—		—		—		3	0	3	0
Southampton	2022–23	Premier League	0	0	0	0	1	0	0	0	1	0
Eastleigh (loan)	2022–23	National League	2	0	—		—		0	0	2	0
Newport County (loan)	2023–24	League Two	31	1	6	1	1	0	3	0	41	2
Cheltenham Town (loan)	2024–25	League Two	17	0	2	0	1	0	2	0	22	0
Morecambe	2025–26	National League	33	4	0	0	—		0	0	33	4
Harrogate Town	2026–27	National League	7	2	1	0	—		0	0	8	2
Career total			90	7	9	1	3	0	11	0	113	8
