= Tommy Backwell =

English association football player (born 2003)

Personal information
- Full name: Tommy George Backwell
- Date of birth: 22 June 2003 (age 23)
- Place of birth: Bristol, England
- Height: 1.83 m (6 ft 0 in)
- Position: Central midfielder

Team information
- Current team: Southend United
- Number: 22

Youth career
- Mangotsfield United
- Southampton
- –2022: Bristol City

Senior career*
Years	Team	Apps	(Gls)
2022–2025	Bristol City	0	(0)
2022	→ Bath City (loan)	0	(0)
2023	→ Yate Town (loan)	3	(0)
2025	→ Cheltenham Town (loan)	4	(1)
2025–2026	Cheltenham Town	10	(0)
2026	→ Weston-super-Mare (loan)	13	(2)
2026–	Southend United	0	(0)
- * Club domestic league appearances and goals as of 16:46, 22 July 2026 (UTC)

Tommy George Backwell (born 22 June 2003) is an English Professional footballer who plays as an central midfielder for club Southend United.

== Career ==
=== Bristol City ===
He played with Mangotsfield United and Southampton before joining the Bristol City academy, with whom he signed a professional contract in 2022. He played for the club in the Premier League Cup. He had loan spells at Yate Town and Bath City and made the Bristol City substitutes bench for first-team matches in the EFL Championship and F.A. Cup without making his professional debut. He was part of the Bristol City team which reached the semi-final of the FA Youth Cup and signed a new professional contract with the club in May 2024.

=== Cheltenham Town ===
In January 2025, he had a trial at EFL League Two side Cheltenham Town. He subsequently joined Cheltenham on loan on 16 January 2025. The following day he was included in their match-day squad for their league match against Harrogate Town and made his debut as a second-half substitute. On 3 February 2025, he signed for Cheltenham on a permanent basis.

In February 2026, Backwell joined National League South club Weston-super-Mare on loan for the remainder of the season.

== Career statistics ==
As of match played 2 May 2026

Appearances and goals by club, season and competition
Club	Season	League			FA Cup		League Cup		Other		Total	
Club	Season	Division	Apps	Goals	Apps	Goals	Apps	Goals	Apps	Goals	Apps	Goals
Bristol City	2022–23	Championship	0	0	0	0	0	0	—		0	0
Bristol City	2023–24	Championship	0	0	0	0	0	0	—		0	0
Bristol City	2024–25	Championship	0	0	0	0	0	0	—		0	0
Bristol City	Total		0	0	0	0	0	0	—		0	0
Bath City (loan)	2022–23	National League South	0	0	—		—		—		0	0
Yate Town (loan)	2022–23	SL Premier Division South	3	0	—		—		—		3	0
Cheltenham Town (loan)	2024–25	League Two	4	1	—		—		0	0	4	1
Cheltenham Town	2024–25	League Two	9	0	—		—		1 (Note: Appearance(s) in EFL Trophy)	0	10	0
Cheltenham Town	2025–26	League Two	1	0	0	0	1	0	3	0	5	0
Cheltenham Town	Total		10	0	0	0	1	0	4	0	15	0
Weston-super-Mare (loan)	2025–26	National League South	13	2	—		—		2 (Note: Appearances in National League South play-offs)	0	15	2
Career total			30	3	0	0	1	0	6	0	37	3
