= Jordan Thomas (footballer, born May 2001) =

English footballer

Personal information
- Full name: Jordan Reece Thomas
- Date of birth: 2 May 2001 (age 25)
- Place of birth: Oxford, England
- Position: Winger

Team information
- Current team: Doncaster Rovers
- Number: 19

Youth career
- Oxford United

Senior career*
Years	Team	Apps	(Gls)
2020–2021	Didcot Town	8	(3)
2021–2023	North Leigh	78	(20)
2023–2024	Bath City	28	(10)
2024–2026	Cheltenham Town	93	(14)
2026–	Doncaster Rovers	8	(1)
- * Club domestic league appearances and goals as of 09:11, 1 November 2026 (UTC)

Jordan Reece Thomas (born 2 May 2001) is an English professional footballer who plays as a winger for EFL League One club Doncaster Rovers.

== Career ==
Thomas began his senior career with Southern League Division One South club Didcot Town, joining the club in August 2020. Following the curtailed season, he made the step up a level to join North Leigh.

On 7 June 2023, Thomas joined National League South club Bath City. Following an impressive start to the season, Thomas was linked with a number of Championship clubs, namely Bristol City, Swansea City and Cardiff City.

On 1 February 2024, Thomas signed for League One club Cheltenham Town on a two-and-a-half-year deal. He made his debut two days later, coming off of the bench in a 3–1 home defeat to Wycombe Wanderers. He was released by Cheltenham at the end of the 2025-26 season.

On 28 July 2026, Thomas signed for League One club Doncaster Rovers on a three year deal.

== Career statistics ==
As of match played 7 November 2026

Appearances and goals by club, season and competition
Club	Season	League			FA Cup		EFL Cup		Other		Total	
Club	Season	Division	Apps	Goals	Apps	Goals	Apps	Goals	Apps	Goals	Apps	Goals
Didcot Town	2020–21	SL Division One Central	8	3	1	0	—		1 (Note: Appearance(s) in FA Trophy)	0	10	3
North Leigh	2021–22	SL Division One Central	37	6	1	0	—		5 (Note: One appearance and one goal in FA Trophy, two appearances in Oxfordshire Senior Cup, two appearances in Southern League Division One Central play-offs)	1	43	7
North Leigh	2022–23	SL Premier Division South	41	14	3	1	—		4 (Note: One appearance in FA Trophy, three appearances and seven goals in Oxfordshire Senior Cup)	7	48	22
North Leigh	Total		78	20	4	1	—		9	8	91	29
Bath City	2023–24	National League South	28	10	3	1	—		3	0	34	11
Cheltenham Town	2023–24	League One	14	0	0	0	0	0	0	0	14	0
Cheltenham Town	2024–25	League Two	40	8	2	0	1	0	5 (Note: Appearance(s) in the EFL Trophy)	1	48	9
Cheltenham Town	2025–26	League Two	39	6	3	2	1	0	0	0	43	8
Cheltenham Town	Total		93	14	5	2	2	0	5	1	105	17
Doncaster Rovers	2026–27	League One	8	1	1	0	2	0	3	0	14	1
Career total			215	48	14	4	4	0	21	9	254	61

== Honours ==
North Leigh

- Southern Football League Division One Central Play Off Winner: 2021-22
