= Tom King (footballer, born 2006) =

English footballer (born 2006)

Personal information
- Full name: Thomas Willoughby King
- Date of birth: 20 September 2006 (age 20)
- Place of birth: Gloucester, England
- Position: Forward

Team information
- Current team: Bolton Wanderers

Youth career
- –2024: Cheltenham Town

Senior career*
| Years | Team | Apps | (Gls) |
| 2023–2026 | Cheltenham Town | 5 | (0) |
| 2025 | → Worthing (loan) | 3 | (1) |
| 2026– | Bolton Wanderers | 0 | (0) |

International career^{‡}
| 2023 | England U18 | 2 | (0) |
- * Club domestic league appearances and goals as of 16:56, 31 October 2025 (UTC) ‡ National team caps and goals as of 12:52, 17 November 2023 (UTC)

Thomas Willoughby King (born 20 September 2006) is an English footballer who plays as a forward for EFL Championship side Bolton Wanderers.

== Career ==
On 5 August 2023, King made his senior debut for Cheltenham Town as a late substitute in a 1–0 opening day defeat to Shrewsbury Town. Aged 16 years and 319 days, he became the youngest player to represent the club in the EFL, breaking the fourteen-year record held by Kyle Haynes.

In January 2024, he signed a first professional contract to keep him at the club until June 2026. He was named Cheltenham's Young Player of the Season award for the 2023–24 season, as well as having been nominated for the League One Apprentice of the Season.

On 31 October 2025, King joined National League South club Worthing on loan until January 2026.

On 5 May 2026, it was announced King would be leaving Cheltenham at the end of his contract.

On 4 August 2026, he joined EFL Championship side Bolton Wanderers on a two-year deal, initially linking up with the club's under–21 side.

== International career ==
In October 2023, King was called up to the England U18s squad for their upcoming fixtures. He became the first Cheltenham Town player to be called up to an England squad of any age group.

== Career statistics ==
As of match played 7 October 2025

Appearances and goals by club, season and competition
| Club | Season | League | | | FA Cup | | League Cup | | Other | | Total | |
| Club | Season | Division | Apps | Goals | Apps | Goals | Apps | Goals | Apps | Goals | Apps | Goals |
|---|---|---|---|---|---|---|---|---|---|---|---|---|
| Cheltenham Town | 2023–24 | League One | 1 | 0 | 0 | 0 | 1 | 0 | 1 (Note: Appearance(s) in EFL Trophy) | 0 | 3 | 0 |
| Cheltenham Town | 2024–25 | League Two | 4 | 0 | 0 | 0 | 0 | 0 | 1 | 1 | 5 | 1 |
| Cheltenham Town | 2025–26 | League Two | 0 | 0 | 0 | 0 | 0 | 0 | 3 | 0 | 3 | 0 |
| Career total | | | 5 | 0 | 0 | 0 | 1 | 0 | 5 | 1 | 11 | 1 |

== Honours ==
Individual

- Cheltenham Town Young Player of the Season: 2023–24
