= Ethon Archer =

English footballer (born 2002)

Personal information
- Full name: Ethon Emmanuel Archer
- Date of birth: 28 August 2002 (age 24)
- Place of birth: Croydon, England
- Height: 1.88 m (6 ft 2 in)
- Position: Left winger

Team information
- Current team: Bromley (on loan from Luton Town)
- Number: 7

Youth career
- 2018–2020: Kinetic Academy

Senior career*
Years	Team	Apps	(Gls)
2020–2021	Whyteleafe	1	(0)
2021	Bedfont Sports	0	(0)
2021–2022	Sutton Common Rovers	1	(0)
2022	→ Horley Town (loan)	16	(0)
2022–2023	Raynes Park Vale	34	(15)
2023	Welling United	0	(0)
2023	→ Three Bridges (loan)	7	(1)
2023–2024	Torquay United	26	(2)
2024–2025	Cheltenham Town	52	(7)
2025–	Luton Town	0	(0)
2025–2026	→ Cheltenham Town (loan)	18	(2)
2026	→ Port Vale (loan)	20	(3)
2026–	→ Bromley (loan)	6	(0)
- * Club domestic league appearances and goals as of 11:23, 22 November 2026 (UTC)

Ethon Emmanuel Archer (born 28 August 2002) is an English professional footballer who plays as a left-winger for EFL League One club Bromley, on loan from EFL League One club Luton Town.

Archer came through the Kinetic Academy as a teenager and spent time at eight non-League clubs: Whyteleafe, Bedfont Sports, Sutton Common Rovers, Horley Town (on loan), Raynes Park Vale, Welling United, Three Bridges (on loan), and Torquay United. He scored 15 goals as Raynes Park Vale won the 2022–23 Combined Counties League Premier Division South title. He entered the English Football League after being signed by Cheltenham Town in July 2024. He won a move to Luton Town in September 2025, though immediately rejoined Cheltenham Town on loan. He was loaned to Port Vale in January 2026 and Bromley in July 2026.

== Early life ==
Ethon Emmanuel Archer was born in Croydon on 28 August 2002, though grew up on the Roundshaw estate in Wallington. His cousins, Mickel Miller and Thierry Small, also play professional football.

== Career ==
=== Early career ===
After playing for the Kinetic Academy, Archer was signed by Whyteleafe in 2020, playing one game against Herne Bay in the Isthmian League South East Division, as well as two cup appearances. His career was then interrupted by the COVID-19 pandemic in England. He made four cup appearances for Bedfont Sports in the 2021–22 season, later saying "I didn’t really get a look-in" at the club. He signed for Sutton Common Rovers later that season, where he made one league appearance, a 7–1 defeat to Bracknell Town in the Isthmian League South Central Division. He then had a loal spell at Horley Town, making 16 league appearances. He then joined Raynes Park Vale, signing in July 2022, scoring 15 goals in 34 league appearances as he helped the club to the Combined Counties League Premier Division South title at the end of the 2022–23 season. He had a trial with Scottish Championship club Ayr United in the summer. He joined National League South club Welling United, and was loaned out to Three Bridges back in the Isthmian League South East Division at the start of the 2023–24 season, picking up six goal contributions and two man of the match awards in ten games. He then signed with National League South club Torquay United. During his time in non-League football he worked numerous retail jobs, with the primary one being an Amazon delivery driver in London. He also worked as a matchday steward at AFC Wimbledon. He became a popular player at Plainmoor, making six goal contributions in 26 appearances. Torquay entered administration during the 2023–24 season.

=== Cheltenham Town ===
Archer signed for Cheltenham Town on 5 July 2024 following a successful trial. He was recruited by the club's director of football, Gary Johnson, who had managed him at Torquay. He made his debut as a 63rd-minute substitute Newport County in a 3–2 win over Whaddon Road on 10 August, when he set up Joel Colwill for the stoppage-time winner. He scored his first goal in the English Football League on 14 September, in a 2–1 defeat at Salford City. Manager Michael Flynn played him out of position at central midfield for a spell and praised his "game intelligence, workrate, passing, close control with the ball". He signed a contract extension in March 2025 to keep him at the club until the summer of 2027 after the club rejected a bid of £250,000 from Milton Keynes Dons in the January transfer window. He scored eight goals and claimed six assists in the 2024–25 campaign, playing in every League Two fixture. The club rejected a bid from Peterborough United in August 2025, having previously turned down £100,000 from Stevenage.

=== Luton Town ===
In September 2025, Archer signed for League One side Luton Town for a fee of £500,000 and immediately rejoined Cheltenham on loan. Robins manager Steve Cotterill said that he was "a great kid" and "I'll miss him being around that's for sure". He also said that Archer's "sweet half-volley" against Swindon Town in December was of such quality that it was a goal that "could win a World Cup final". Archer joined up with Jack Wilshere's Hatters squad for the first time from 3 January 2026 when his loan with Cheltenham ended. On 21 January, he joined Port Vale at the bottom of League One on loan until the end of the 2025–26 season, becoming new boss Jon Brady's first signing since taking over. On 16 April, he scored two goals from direct free kicks in a 3–1 victory at Peterborough United. He was deployed as an attacking midfielder and a central striker as the team struggled to play with wingers and were relegated at the end of the season.

In July 2026, he moved on a season-long loan to newly promoted League One club Bromley.

== Style of play ==
Archer was described by GloucestershireLive's Cheltenham Town reporter Jon Palmer as an "exciting" winger who was "fleet-footed and full of tricks... with a tendency to cut inside and fire shots at goal with his right foot", as well as hard-working and with a trait of scoring "spectacular" goals.

== Career statistics ==
As of match played 21 November 2026

Appearances and goals by club, season and competition
Club	Season	League			FA Cup		EFL Cup		Other		Total	
Club	Season	Division	Apps	Goals	Apps	Goals	Apps	Goals	Apps	Goals	Apps	Goals
Whyteleafe	2020–21	Isthmian League; South East Division	1	0	1	0	—		1 (Note: Appearance(s) in FA Trophy)	0	3	0
Bedfont Sports	2021–22	Southern League; Division One Central	0	0	1	0	—		3 (Note: Two appearances in FA Trophy, one appearance in Middlesex Senior Cup)	0	4	0
Sutton Common Rovers	2021–22	Isthmian League; South Central Division	1	0	—		—		1 (Note: Appearance(s) in Surrey Senior Cup)	0	2	0
Horley Town (loan)	2021–22	Combined Counties League; Premier Division South	16	0	—		—		—		16	0
Raynes Park Vale	2022–23	Combined Counties League; Premier Division South	34	15	—		—		—		34	15
Three Bridges (loan)	2023–24	Isthmian League; South East Division	7	1	0	0	—		3 (Note: Two appearances in FA Trophy, one appearance and one goal in Alan Turvey Trophy)	1	10	2
Torquay United	2023–24	National League South	26	2	—		—		—		26	2
Cheltenham Town	2024–25	League Two	46	7	2	1	1	0	4 (Note: Appearance(s) in EFL Trophy)	0	53	8
Cheltenham Town	2025–26	League Two	6	0	0	0	2	0	0	0	8	0
Cheltenham Town	Total		52	7	2	1	3	0	4	0	61	8
Luton Town	2025–26	League One	0	0	0	0	—		1	0	1	0
Luton Town	2026–27	League One	0	0	0	0	0	0	0	0	0	0
Luton Town	Total		0	0	0	0	0	0	1	0	1	0
Cheltenham Town (loan)	2025–26	League Two	18	2	2	1	0	0	0	0	20	3
Port Vale (loan)	2025–26	League One	20	3	3	0	0	0	0	0	23	3
Bromley (loan)	2026–27	League One	6	0	1	0	1	0	3	0	11	0
Career total			181	30	10	2	4	0	16	1	211	33

== Honours ==
Raynes Park Vale

- Combined Counties League Premier Division South: 2022–23
