= Harrison Sohna =

English footballer (born 2002)

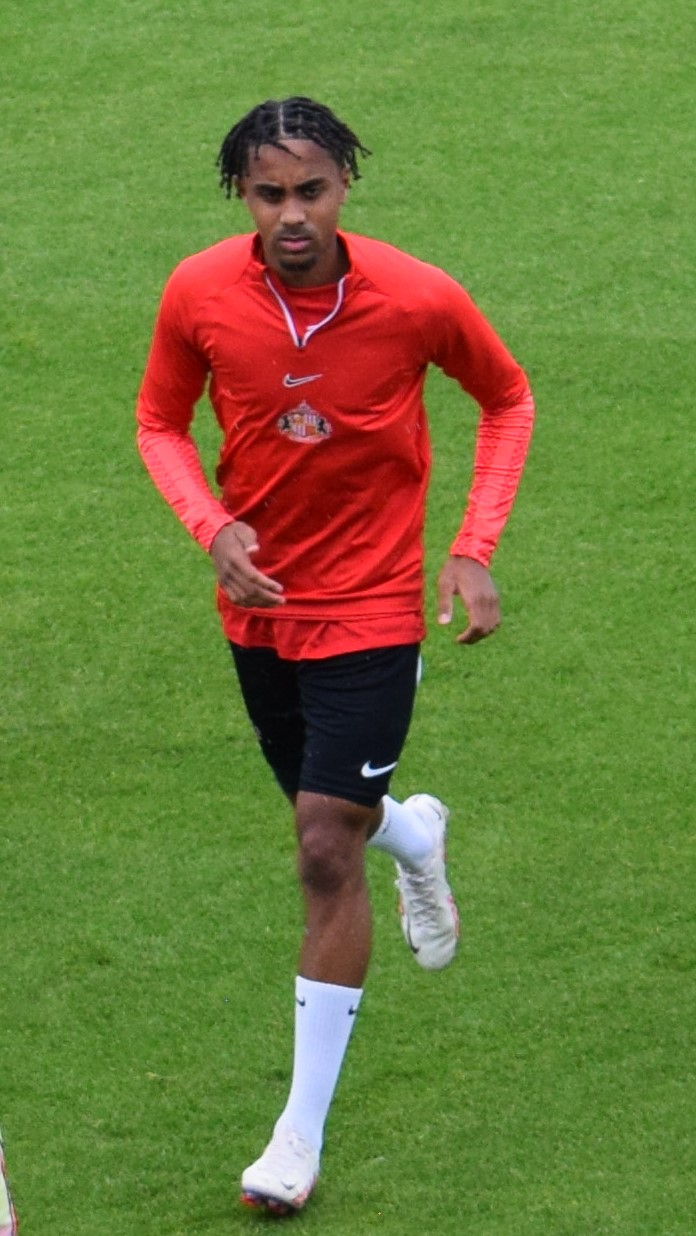
- Sohna warming up for Sunderland in 2022

Personal information
- Full name: Harrison Sheriff Sohna
- Date of birth: 1 July 2002 (age 24)
- Place of birth: Gloucester, England
- Height: 5 ft 10 in (1.78 m)
- Position: Midfielder

Team information
- Current team: Woking
- Number: 7

Youth career
- –2021: Aston Villa

Senior career*
Years	Team	Apps	(Gls)
2021	Aston Villa	0	(0)
2021–2023	Sunderland	0	(0)
2024–2026	Cheltenham Town	8	(0)
2025	→ Wealdstone (loan)	18	(3)
2026	Hereford	12	(4)
2026–	Woking	9	(1)
- * Club domestic league appearances and goals as of 20:18, 21 November 2026 (UTC)

Harrison Sheriff Sohna (born 1 July 2002) is an English professional footballer who plays as a midfielder for National League club Woking. A product of the Aston Villa academy, Sohna has featured for Aston Villa and Sunderland in cup competitions.

== Career ==
=== Aston Villa ===
Sonha made his senior debut as a substitute in a 4–1 FA Cup defeat to Liverpool on 8 January 2021. He went on trial with Sunderland towards the end of the season, and made one Premier League 2 appearance in a 3–2 away win over Norwich City on 16 April.

Sohna was released by Aston Villa at the end of the 2020–21 season.

=== Sunderland ===
On 1 July 2021, League One club Sunderland announced Sohna as one of several new signings for their academy. Sohna made his senior debut for Sunderland on 10 August 2022, in a 2–0 defeat to Sheffield Wednesday in the EFL Cup. He was released by the club at the end of the 2022–23 season.

=== Cheltenham Town ===
After over a year without a club, on 18 July 2024, Sohna signed for EFL League Two club Cheltenham Town after a successful trial. On 10 August 2024, Sohna made his English Football League debut in a 3–2 victory over Newport County.

On 22 January 2025, Sohna joined National League side Wealdstone on loan for the remainder of the season.

In June 2025, Sohna was placed on the transfer list and went on trial with Swindon Town, though a move did not materialise. In February 2026, he departed the club after reaching a mutual agreement with the club to terminate his contract.

=== Hereford ===
On 24 February 2026, Sohna signed for National League North club Hereford. He made his debut the same day in a 5–2 league win at home against Chester. He scored four goals in 12 matches for the club, including scoring twice in a 2–1 win at home against league leaders South Shields, and was sent off twice, as Hereford battled to avoid relegation. At the end of the season, he was offered a new deal with the club.

=== Woking ===
On 29 May 2026, Sohna joined National League club Woking, signing a two-year contract and reuniting with former Sunderland teammate and Woking manager Jermain Defoe.

== Career statistics ==
As of match played 21 November 2026

Appearances and goals by club, season and competition
Club	Season	League			FA Cup		EFL Cup		Other		Total	
Club	Season	Division	Apps	Goals	Apps	Goals	Apps	Goals	Apps	Goals	Apps	Goals
Aston Villa U21	2019–20	—			—		—		1 (Note: Appearance(s) in EFL Trophy)	0	1	0
Aston Villa U21	2020–21	—			—		—		1	1	1	1
Aston Villa U21	Total		—		—		—		2	1	2	1
Aston Villa	2020–21	Premier League	0	0	1	0	0	0	0	0	1	0
Sunderland	2021–22	League One	0	0	0	0	0	0	3	0	3	0
Sunderland	2022–23	Championship	0	0	0	0	1	0	0	0	1	0
Sunderland	Total		0	0	0	0	1	0	3	0	4	0
Cheltenham Town	2024–25	League Two	8	0	0	0	1	0	3	1	12	1
Cheltenham Town	2025–26	League Two	0	0	0	0	1	0	2	0	3	0
Cheltenham Town	Total		8	0	0	0	2	0	5	1	15	1
Wealdstone (loan)	2024–25	National League	18	3	—		—		—		18	3
Hereford	2025–26	National League North	12	4	—		—		—		12	4
Woking	2026–27	National League	9	1	1	0	—		4 (Note: Appearance(s) in National League Cup)	1	14	2
Career total			47	8	2	0	3	0	14	3	66	11

== Personal life ==
Sohna attended Severn Vale School in Gloucester.

Harrison's twin brother Myles also played for Aston Villa Under-21s, but was forced to retire from football aged 22 due to persistent injuries.
