= Arkell Jude-Boyd =

Saint Lucian footballer (born 2003)

Personal information
- Full name: Arkell Nicholas Cecil Jude-Boyd
- Date of birth: 22 January 2003 (age 23)
- Place of birth: Hillingdon, England
- Height: 6 ft 0 in (1.82 m)
- Position: Right back

Team information
- Current team: Shrewsbury Town
- Number: 17

Youth career
- 2011–2022: Queens Park Rangers

Senior career*
Years	Team	Apps	(Gls)
2022–2024	Queens Park Rangers	0	(0)
2022	→ Dagenham & Redbridge (loan)	0	(0)
2024	→ Torquay United (loan)	17	(6)
2024–2026	Cheltenham Town	71	(3)
2026–	Shrewsbury Town	8	(0)

International career^{‡}
2024–	Saint Lucia	6	(1)
- * Club domestic league appearances and goals as of 09:48, 1 November 2026 (UTC) ‡ National team caps and goals as of 10:05, 31 July 2025 (UTC)

Arkell Nicholas Cecil Jude-Boyd (born 22 January 2003) is a professional footballer who plays as a right back for Shrewsbury Town. Born in England, he plays for the Saint Lucia national team.

Jude-Boyd progressed through Queens Park Rangers's academy and had loans at Dagenham & Redbridge and Torquay United before joining Cheltenham Town in summer 2024 leaving in 2026. Joining Shrewsbury Town in Summer 2026

== Club career ==
=== Queens Park Rangers ===
Jude-Boyd joined Queens Park Rangers's academy at under-9 level. He signed his first professional contract with the club in summer 2022. In December 2022, Jude-Boyd joined National League club Dagenham & Redbridge on a one-month development loan. He did not make an appearance during this loan. On 28 June 2023, it was announced that he had agreed a new one-year deal with Queens Park Rangers.

In February 2024, he joined National League South side Torquay United on loan, and made his debut on 6 February, starting a 3–2 defeat away to Maidstone United. Jude Boyd scored 6 times in 17 matches across his Torquay loan, being awarded the club's player of the month award for February, March and April, as well as the goal of the month in March 2024 for a goal against Weymouth. He was also given Torquay's young player of the season award at the end of the season. He was released by QPR at the end of the season.

=== Cheltenham Town ===
In June 2024, Jude-Boyd signed for EFL League Two club Cheltenham Town. After substitute appearances against Plymouth Argyle and Grimsby Town, he made his first start on 24 August in a 1–0 home defeat to AFC Wimbledon. He scored his first goal for the club on 21 September 2024, with a second-half equaliser in a 1–1 draw with Chesterfield, but suffered a hamstring injury while scoring which was expected to leave him unavailable for four months. Jude-Boyd returned as a second-half substitute against Rotherham United on 2 November however, and went on to make 34 league appearances in total across the 2024–25 season, in which he scored three goals and provided three assists. He was subject to a rejected transfer bid from Peterborough United in January 2025, and transfer interest from both Stockport County and Derby County in summer 2025.

On 5 May 2026, the club announced the player would leave in the summer once his contract expired.

== International career ==
Jude-Boyd was included in Saint Lucia's 23-man squad for the 2023–24 CONCACAF Nations League in November 2023, but was unable to play due to documentation issues. He was included in Saint Lucia's squad for the 2024–25 CONCACAF Nations League in September 2024 against Curaçao and Grenada. He made his debut against Curaçao, scoring first in an eventual 2-1 win.

== Style of play ==
Torquay manager Gary Johnson described Jude-Boyd as "a very quick, aggressive defender who can play right-back, or right wing-back".

== Career statistics ==
=== Club ===
As of match played 31 October 2026

Appearances and goals by club, season and competition
Club	Season	League			FA Cup		League Cup		Other		Total	
Club	Season	Division	Apps	Goals	Apps	Goals	Apps	Goals	Apps	Goals	Apps	Goals
Queens Park Rangers	2022–23	Championship	0	0	0	0	0	0	0	0	0	0
Queens Park Rangers	2023–24	Championship	0	0	0	0	0	0	0	0	0	0
Queens Park Rangers	Total		0	0	0	0	0	0	0	0	0	0
Dagenham & Redbridge (loan)	2022–23	National League	0	0	0	0	–	–	0	0	0	0
Torquay United (loan)	2023–24	National League South	17	6	0	0	–	–	0	0	17	6
Cheltenham Town	2024–25	League Two	34	3	2	0	1	0	4 (Note: Appearance(s) in EFL Trophy)	1	41	4
Cheltenham Town	2025–26	League Two	37	0	2	0	2	0	1	0	42	0
Cheltenham Town	Total		71	3	4	0	3	0	5	1	83	4
Shrewsbury Town	2026–27	League Two	8	0	0	0	2	0	2	0	12	0
Career total			96	9	4	0	5	0	7	1	112	10

=== International ===
As of match played 10 June 2025

Appearances and goals by national team and year
National team	Year	Apps	Goals
Saint Lucia	2024	4	1
Saint Lucia	2025	2	0
Total		6	1

Scores and results list Saint Lucia's goal tally first, score column indicates score after each Jude-Boyd goal.

List of international goals scored by Arkell Jude-Boyd
No.	Date	Venue	Opponent	Score	Result	Competition	Ref.
1	6 September 2024	Kirani James Athletic Stadium, St. George's, Grenada	Curaçao	1–0	2–1	2024–25 CONCACAF Nations League B	
