= List of Cheltenham Town F.C. seasons =

Cheltenham Town are an English football club, formed in 1887. After several decades in local football, they joined the Birmingham Combination in 1932–33, moving to the Southern League Western Section in 1935–36.

== Birmingham Combination history ==
Season	∆ (Note: This underlined "∆" denotes the overall level in the English football league system (1 being the highest).)	Birmingham Combination	Pos	∆ (Note: This second "∆" denotes place compared to other clubs in entire English football league system (1 being the 1st place in the highest division).)	P	W	D	L	F	A	GD	Pts	PtsPG	FA Cup	FA Trophy	Notes
1932–33		Birmingham Combination	3		36	20	7	9	93	61	+32	47	1.47			
1933–34		Birmingham Combination	5		34	17	8	9	81	53	+28	42	1.42	R3		
1934–35		Birmingham Combination	10		32	14	4	14	70	61	+9	32	1.00	QR4		

== Southern League history ==
Season	∆ (Note: This underlined "∆" denotes the overall level in the English football league system (1 being the highest).)	Southern League Division	Pos	∆ (Note: This second "∆" denotes place compared to other clubs in entire English football league system (1 being the 1st place in the highest division).)	P	W	D	L	F	A	GD	Pts	PtsPG	FA Cup	FA Trophy	Notes
1935–36	4	Southern League Western Section	6		16	6	2	8	32	28	+4	14	0.88			Played in two Southern League sections
1935–36	4	Southern League Central Section	9		20	5	5	10	32	45	−13	15	0.75	R1		Played in two Southern League sections
1936–37	4	Southern League	11		30	10	4	16	61	70	−9	24	0.80	QR4		
1937–38	4	Southern League	11		34	13	5	16	72	68	+4	31	0.91	R1		
1938–39	4	Southern League	13		44	16	9	19	76	105	−29	41	0.93	R1		
1939–40	4	Southern League	2		3	2	1	0	11	3	+8	5	1.67			Season interrupted by outbreak of World War II
1939–40	4	Southern League Western Section	7		13	3	2	8	21	38	−17	8	0.62			
																World War II
1945–46	4	Southern League	4		18	9	8	1	35	54	−19	22	1.22	R1		Statistics for this season are incomplete
1946–47	4	Southern League	9	75	32	14	3	14	68	75	−7	32	1.00	R1		
1947–48	4	Southern League	10	76	34	13	9	12	71	71	0	35	1.03	R2		
1948–49	4	Southern League	9	75	42	19	14	9	71	64	+7	47	1.12	QR4		
1949–50	4	Southern League	20	86	46	13	11	22	75	96	−21	37	0.80	QR4		
1950–51	4	Southern League	6	72	44	21	8	15	91	61	+30	50	1.14	R1		
1951–52	4	Southern League	18	84	42	15	4	23	59	65	−6	34	0.81	QR4		
1952–53	4	Southern League	13	79	42	15	11	16	70	89	−19	41	0.98	QR2		
1953–54	4	Southern League	21	87	42	11	12	19	56	83	−27	34	0.81	QR1		
1954–55	4	Southern League	4	72	42	21	8	13	85	72	+13	50	1.19	QR1		
1955–56	4	Southern League	2	70	42	25	6	11	82	53	+29	56	1.33	QR1		
1956–57	4	Southern League	4	72	42	19	15	8	73	46	+27	53	1.26	R1		
1957–58	4	Southern League	6	74	42	21	10	11	115	66	+49	52	1.24	QR1		
1958–59	5	North West Section	4	96	34	20	4	10	65	47	+18	44	1.29	PR		
1959–60	5	Premier Division	4	96	42	21	6	15	82	68	+14	48	1.14	R1		Southern League two division structure created
1960–61	5	Premier Division	17	113	42	15	7	20	81	82	−1	37	0.88	QR4		
1961–62	5	Premier Division	22	118	42	9	7	26	48	86	−38	25	0.60	QR4		Finished last in table and relegated to First Division
1962–63	6	First Division	9	122	38	18	7	13	83	52	+31	43	1.13	R1		
1963–64	6	First Division	3	117	42	25	10	7	91	49	+42	60	1.43	QR3		
1964–65	5	Premier Division	12	104	42	15	11	16	72	78	−6	41	0.98	QR4		
1965–66	5	Premier Division	18	110	42	13	9	20	69	99	−30	35	0.83	QR4		
1966–67	5	Premier Division	13	105	42	16	11	15	60	71	−11	43	1.02	QR4		
1967–68	5	Premier Division	4	96	42	23	7	12	97	67	+30	53	1.26	QR4		Received 3 votes for election to The Football League
1968–69	5	Premier Division	19	112	42	15	5	22	55	64	−9	35	0.83	R1		Relegated to the First Division by 0.019 of a goal
1969–70	6	First Division	10	125	42	20	5	17	78	81	−3	45	1.07	R1	R1	FA Trophy created
1970–71	6	First Division	15	130	38	8	15	15	44	58	−14	31	0.82	R1	QR3	
1971–72	6	First Division North	3	117	34	20	4	10	72	51	+21	44	1.29	QR4	QR3	
1972–73	6	First Division North	3	117	42	24	8	10	87	47	+40	56	1.33	QR3	R1	
1973–74	6	First Division North	3	117	42	24	8	10	75	51	+24	56	1.33			Did not participate in FA Cup or FA Trophy rounds
1974–75	6	First Division North	6	120	42	21	9	12	72	53	+19	51	1.21	R1	R2	Dave Lewis scores a single-season club record 53 goals across all competitions
1975–76	6	First Division North	5	119	42	20	10	12	87	55	+32	50	1.19	QR4	R1	
1976–77	6	First Division North	2	116	38	23	8	7	85	35	+50	54	1.42	QR4	R1	
1977–78	5	Premier Division	14	106	42	12	14	16	43	52	−9	38	0.90	QR2	R1	
1978–79	5	Premier Division	18	110	42	11	10	21	38	72	−34	32	0.76	QR4	R3	Not invited to join the Alliance Premier League

== Football League system history ==
Season	∆	Division	Pos	∆	P	W	D	L	F	A	GD	Pts	PtsPG	FA Cup	FA Trophy	Notes	Manager
1979–80	6	Southern League Midland Division	19	131	42	13	5	24	49	70	−21	31	0.74	QR2	R2		Terry Paine/Alan Grundy
1980–81	6	Southern League Division 1 Midland	8	120	42	18	12	12	70	59	+11	48	1.14	QR2	R1		Alan Grundy
1981–82	6	Southern League Division 1 Midland	16	130	42	11	14	17	65	68	−3	36	0.86	QR4	R1	Relegated after reorganisation of Southern League	Alan Grundy/Alan Wood
1982–83	7	Southern League Midland Division	1	135	32	22	5	5	65	29	+36	71	2.22	QR4	R1	Promoted to Southern Football League Premier Division	Alan Wood
1983–84	6	Southern League Premier Division	8	122	38	16	7	15	63	56	+7	55	1.45	QR4	QR3		Alan Wood/John Murphy
1984–85	6	Southern League Premier Division	1	115	38	24	5	9	83	41	+42	77	2.03	QR3	R2	Promoted to Alliance Premier League	John Murphy
1985–86	5	Alliance Premier League	11	103	42	16	11	15	69	69	0	46	1.10	QR1	QF		John Murphy
1986–87	5	Conference National	11	103	42	16	13	13	64	50	+14	61	1.45	QR1	R3		John Murphy
1987–88	5	Conference National	13	105	42	11	20	11	64	67	−3	53	1.26	R1	QF		John Murphy
1988–89	5	Conference National	15	107	40	12	12	16	55	58	−3	48	1.20	QR2	R2		John Murphy/Jim Barron
1989–90	5	Conference National	11	103	42	16	11	15	58	60	−2	59	1.40	QR3	R3		Jim Barron
1990–91	5	Conference National	16	106	42	12	12	18	54	72	−18	48	1.14	R1	R3		Jim Barron/John Murphy/Dave Lewis (Caretaker)
1991–92	5	Conference National	21	113	42	10	13	19	56	82	−26	43	1.02	QR3	R2		Ally Robertson/Lindsay Parsons
1992–93	6	Southern League Premier Division	2	116	40	21	10	9	76	40	+36	73	1.83	R2	R1		Lindsay Parsons
1993–94	6	Southern League Premier Division	2	116	42	21	12	9	67	38	+29	75	1.79	QR4	R3		Lindsay Parsons
1994–95	6	Southern League Premier Division	2	116	42	25	11	6	87	39	+48	86	2.05	QR4	R2		Lindsay Parsons
1995–96	6	Southern League Premier Division	3	117	42	21	11	10	76	57	+19	74	1.76	QR2	R1		Chris Robinson
1996–97	6	Southern League Premier Division	2	116	42	21	11	10	76	44	+32	74	1.76	R1	R1	Promoted to Conference after Gresley F.C. ground failed Conference requirements	Chris Robinson/Steve Cotterill
1997–98	5	Conference National	2	94	42	23	9	10	63	43	+20	78	1.86	R3	Winners	1997–98 FA Trophy winners (def. Southport 1–0)	Steve Cotterill
1998–99	5	Conference National	1	93	42	22	14	6	71	36	+35	80	1.90	R1	SF	Promoted to The Football League for the first time	Steve Cotterill
Season	∆	Division	Pos	∆	P	W	D	L	F	A	GD	Pts	PtsPG	FA Cup	League Cup	Notes	Manager(s)
1999–00	4	Third Division	8	76	46	20	10	16	50	42	+8	70	1.52	R1	R1		Steve Cotterill
2000–01	4	Third Division	9	77	46	18	14	14	59	52	+7	68	1.48	R2	R1		Steve Cotterill
2001–02	4	Third Division	4	72	46	21	15	10	66	49	+17	78	1.70	R5	R1	Promoted to Division Two via the play-offs. Highest position achieved in FA Cup	Steve Cotterill
2002–03	3	Second Division	21	65	46	10	18	18	53	68	−15	48	1.04	R3	R2		Graham Allner/Bobby Gould
2003–04	4	Third Division	14	82	46	14	14	18	57	71	−14	56	1.22	R3	R1		Bobby Gould/John Ward
2004–05	4	League Two	14	82	46	16	12	18	51	54	−3	60	1.30	R1	R1		John Ward
2005–06	4	League Two	5	73	46	19	15	12	65	53	+12	72	1.57	R4	R2	Promoted to League One via the play-offs	John Ward
2006–07	3	League One	17	61	46	15	9	22	49	61	−12	54	1.17	R1	R2		John Ward
2007–08	3	League One	19	63	46	13	12	21	42	64	−22	51	1.11	R1	R1		John Ward/Keith Downing
2008–09	3	League One	23	67	46	9	12	25	51	91	−40	39	0.85	R3	R2	Worst goal difference and joint worst win percentage (19.6%) in club history	Keith Downing/Martin Allen
2009–10	4	League Two	22	90	46	10	18	18	54	71	−17	48	1.04	R1	R1		Martin Allen/John Schofield (Caretaker)/Mark Yates
2010–11	4	League Two	17	85	46	13	13	20	56	77	−21	52	1.13	R2	R1		Mark Yates
2011–12	4	League Two	6	74	46	23	8	15	66	50	+16	77	1.67	R3	R1	Losing play-off finalists	Mark Yates
2012–13	4	League Two	5	73	46	20	15	11	58	51	+7	75	1.63	R3	R1	Losing play-off semi-finalists	Mark Yates
2013–14	4	League Two	17	85	46	13	16	17	53	63	−10	55	1.20	R1	R2		Mark Yates
2014–15	4	League Two	23	91	46	9	14	23	40	67	−27	41	0.89	R2	R1	Joint worst win percentage in club history (19.6%). Only 5 clean sheets.	Mark Yates/Paul Buckle/Russell Milton (Caretaker)/Gary Johnson
2015–16	5	Conference National	1	93	46	30	11	5	87	30	+57	101	2.20	R1	R2 (Note: FA Trophy)	Best Goal Difference in club history	Gary Johnson
2016–17	4	League Two	21	89	46	12	14	20	49	69	–20	50	1.08	R2	R2		Gary Johnson
2017–18	4	League Two	17	85	46	13	12	21	67	73	–6	51	1.11	R1	R2		Gary Johnson
2018–19	4	League Two	16	84	46	15	12	19	57	68	–11	57	1.24	R2	R2		Gary Johnson/Michael Duff
2019–20	4	League Two	4	72	36	17	13	6	52	27	+25	64	1.78	R2	R1	End of regular season cancelled due to COVID-19 pandemic. Final standing based on points per game. Losing play-off semi-finalists.	Michael Duff
2020–21	4	League Two	1	69	46	24	10	12	61	39	+22	82	1.78	R4	R2	Promoted as champions. Nearly all games played behind closed doors due to the COVID-19 pandemic.	Michael Duff
2021–22	3	League One	15	59	46	13	17	16	68	78	-10	56	1.22	R2	R3	Highest position achieved in English football system.	Michael Duff
2022–23	3	League One	16	60	46	14	12	20	45	61	-16	54	1.17	R1	R1		Wade Elliott
2023–24	3	League One	21	65	46	12	8	26	41	65	-24	44	0.96	R1	R1		Wade Elliott/Kevin Russell(Caretaker)/Darrell Clarke
2024–25	4	League Two	15	83	46	16	12	18	60	70	-10	60	1.30	R2	R1		Michael Flynn
2025–26	4	League Two	18	86	46	14	10	22	53	79	-26	52	1.13	R3	R2		Michael Flynn/Aaron Downes(Caretaker)/Steve Cotterill
