= Edgar Barnett =

English cricketer and footballer

Edgar Playle Barnett (22 March 1885, Cheltenham, Gloucestershire – 20 January 1922, Cheltenham, Gloucestershire) was an English cricketer who played for Gloucestershire. He was the captain of Cheltenham Cricket Club and a prolific run scorer at club level, although his highest score in first class cricket was 95 v Somerset in 1921.

He also played football for his local team Cheltenham Town in the early 1900s with his brother Charles and Percival. He is also the uncle of Charlie Barnett.

Barnett died of meningitis in 1922 aged 36.
