= Dale Watkins =

English footballer

Personal information
- Full name: Dale Andrew Watkins
- Date of birth: 4 November 1971 (age 55)
- Place of birth: Peterborough, England
- Position: Forward

Youth career
- Sheffield United

Senior career*
Years	Team	Apps	(Gls)
1989–1990	Sheffield United	0	(0)
	→ Grimsby Town (loan)	0	(0)
	→ Rotherham United (loan)	0	(0)
1990–1991	Peterborough United	10	(0)
- Peterborough City
- Wisbech Town
1992–1993	Grantham Town		
1993–1996	Rushden & Diamonds	118	(71)
1996–1997	Gloucester City	52	(35)
1997–1999	Cheltenham Town		
1999	→ Kettering Town (loan)	4	(1)
1999–2002	Kettering Town	71	(14)
2002–2004	Chelmsford City		
2003	→ Grantham Town (loan)		
2003–2004	→ King's Lynn (loan)		
- King's Lynn
- Stamford
- → Yaxley (loan)
- → Blackstones (loan)
- Yaxley

International career
- England U15
	England C	5	
- * Club domestic league appearances and goals

Dale Allan Watkins (born 4 November 1971) is an English former footballer who played as a forward.

== Career ==
Watkins began his career with Sheffield United. In 1991, Watkins signed for hometown club Peterborough United. At Peterborough, Watkins made ten Football League appearances, before dropping into Non-League football, playing for Peterborough City, Wisbech Town and Grantham Town.

In January 1993, Watkins signed for Rushden & Diamonds. On 19 January 1993, Watkins scored a hat-trick on his full debut against Hinckley Town. Following the signing of Carl Alford in 1996, Watkins became surplus to requirements at the club and subsequently signed for Gloucester City. During Watkins' time at Rushden & Diamonds, he scored 98 goals in 162 appearances in all competitions. At Gloucester, Watkins scored 35 goals in 52 appearances in all competitions in his single season at the club. In 1997, Watkins moved across Gloucestershire, signing for Cheltenham Town. Watkins enjoyed a successful spell whilst at Cheltenham, scoring 29 goals in his first season, winning the 1998 FA Trophy Final and winning the 1998–99 Football Conference. Following a four-game loan spell with Kettering Town in the winter of 1999, Watkins joined the club permanently on 23 December 1999. Watkins made 71 league appearances, scoring 14 times for the club.

In 2002, Watkins signed for Chelmsford City. During his time at the club, Watkins went out on loan to Grantham and King's Lynn, before joining the latter permanently. Following a spell at King's Lynn, Watkins joined Stamford, having spells out on loan with Yaxley and Blackstones, before joining Yaxley permanently in 2006.
