= 2026–27 Cheltenham Town F.C. season =

140th season in existence of Cheltenham Town FC

Cheltenham Town
2026–27 season
- Owner: Mike Garlick
- Chairman: David Bloxham
- Manager: Steve Cotterill
- Stadium: Whaddon Road
Home colours

The 2026–27 season is the 140th season in the history of Cheltenham Town Football Club and their third consecutive season in League Two. In addition to the domestic league, the club also will participate in the FA Cup, the EFL Cup, and the EFL Trophy.

== Transfers and contracts ==
=== In ===
Date	Pos.	Player	From	Fee	Ref.
18 June 2026	CDM	(Northern Ireland) Charlie McCann	(England) Barrow	Nominal	
1 July 2026 (Note: The transfer was announced on 23 June, and would become official on July 1 once Shipley's contract at Port Vale expired.)	LM	(Republic of Ireland) Jordan Shipley	(England) Port Vale	Free	
1 July 2026 (Note: The transfer was announced on 29 June, and would become official on July 1 once Sweeney's contract at Exeter City expired.)	CB	(Republic of Ireland) Pierce Sweeney	(England) Exeter City	Free	
1 July 2026 (Note: The transfer was announced on 29 June, and would become official on July 1 once Tomlinson's contract at Milton Keynes Dons expired.)	LWB	(England) Joe Tomlinson	(England) Milton Keynes Dons	Free	
17 July 2026	CDM	(England) Shaun McWilliams	(England) Rotherham United	Free	
18 July 2026	GK	(England) Wyll Stanway	(England) Barrow	Undisclosed	
8 August 2026	LW	(England) Favour Onukwuli	(England) Sheffield Wednesday	Free	
14 August 2026	CF	(Austria) Andreas Weimann	(England) Derby County	Free	

=== Loaned in ===
Date	Pos.	Player	From	Loaned until	Ref.
4 August 2026	CF	(England) Kirsten Otchere	(England) Leicester City	End of Season	
10 August 2026	RW	(England) Jake Evans	(England) Leicester City	End of Season	

=== Loaned out ===
Date	Pos.	Player	To	Loaned until	Ref.
6 August 2026	CM	(England) Harry Tustin	(England) Hereford	End of Season	
14 August 2026	CF	(England) Sopuruchukwu Obieri	(England) Evesham United	End of Season	
21 August 2026	GK	(England) Mamadou Diallo	(England) Worcester City	19 September 2026	
20 November 2026	LW	(England) Archie Hill	(England) Malvern Town	20 December 2026	
20 November 2026	LW	(England) George McNamee	(England) Worcester Raiders	20 December 2026	

=== Released/out of contract ===
Date	Pos.	Player	Subsequent club	Joined date	Ref.
30 June 2026	RWB	(England) Ieuan Bailey	(United States) UCCS Mountain Lions	1 July 2026	
30 June 2026	CM	(England) Charlie Caple	(England) Cinderford Town	1 July 2026	
30 June 2026	LB	(England) George Harmon	(England) Brackley Town	1 July 2026	
30 June 2026	RB	(Saint Lucia) Arkell Jude-Boyd	(England) Shrewsbury Town	1 July 2026	
30 June 2026	CM	(England) Tommy Backwell	(England) Southend United	22 July 2026	
30 June 2026	RW	(England) Jordan Thomas	(England) Doncaster Rovers	28 July 2026	
30 June 2026	CF	(England) Tom King	(England) Bolton Wanderers	4 August 2026	
30 June 2026	CDM	(England) Scot Bennett	(England) Weston-super-Mare	5 August 2026	
30 June 2026	CM	(England) Luke Young	(Republic of Ireland) Sligo Rovers	13 August 2026	
30 June 2026	LW	(England) Josh Martin			
30 June 2026	CB	(England) Cameron Walters			

=== New contract ===
Date	Pos.	Player	Contract expiry	Ref.
5 May 2026	CB	(England) Robbie Cundy	30 June 2027	
5 May 2026	LB	(England) George Nurse	30 June 2027	
5 May 2026	CM	(England) Ben Stevenson	30 June 2027	
5 May 2026	CB	(United States) Jonathan Tomkinson	30 June 2027	
5 May 2026	CB	(Wales) James Wilson	30 June 2027	
6 May 2026	CF	(England) George Miller	30 June 2027 (Note: Includes an option for a further year)	
7 May 2026	RWB	(Wales) Ryan Broom	Undisclosed	
30 June 2026	CM	(England) Harry Tustin	Undisclosed	
30 June 2026	LB	(England) Freddy Willcox	Undisclosed	
1 July 2026 (Note: The contract was announced on 30 June, and would officially commence on July 1.)	CB	(England) Mark Barber	Undisclosed (Note: First professional contract)	

== Pre-season and friendlies ==
On 22 May, The Robins announced a pre-season friendly, against Slimbridge. Four days later, a second fixture was confirmed against Evesham United. On 12 June, a home friendly against Milton Keynes Dons was added. On 3 July, Cheltenham announced a warm-weather training camp in Valencia, Spain between 4–11 July.

Win Draw Loss Fixtures

18 July 2026 Friendly	Evesham United	0–3	Cheltenham Town	Evesham
15:00 BST		Report	McCann 15', 86'; Obieri 90+1'	Stadium: The Spiers & Hartwell Stadium; Attendance: 849

25 July 2026 Friendly	Slimbridge	1–6	Cheltenham Town	Cambridge
14:00 BST	Smith 48'	Report	Miller 23', 72'; McCann 26', 29'; Shipley 60'; Barber 88'	Stadium: Thornhill Park; Attendance: 438
Note: Fixture was initially scheduled for 14 July, but was rescheduled to a later date.

1 August 2026 Friendly	Cheltenham Town	0–2	Milton Keynes Dons	Cheltenham
15:00 BST		Report	Méndez-Laing 47'; Collins 52'	Stadium: EV Charger Points Stadium; Attendance: 1,201; Referee: James Durkin

== Competitions ==
=== League Two ===
==== League table ====
Pos	Team	Pld	W	D	L	GF	GA	GD	Pts
10	Tranmere Rovers	16	5	7	4	21	19	+2	22
11	Gillingham	16	5	6	5	23	24	−1	21
12	Cheltenham Town	16	6	3	7	23	29	−6	21
13	Shrewsbury Town	16	6	3	7	20	27	−7	21
14	Accrington Stanley	16	4	8	4	26	22	+4	20

Updated to match(es) played on 21 November 2026. Source: EFL Official Website
Rules for classification: 1) Points; 2) Goal difference; 3) Number of goals scored; 4) Head-to-head results; 5) Wins; 6) Away goals; 7) Penalty points (sec 9.5); 8) 12-point sending off offences

==== Results summary ====
Overall								Home						Away					
Pld	W	D	L	GF	GA	GD	Pts	W	D	L	GF	GA	GD	W	D	L	GF	GA	GD
16	6	3	7	23	29	−6	21	5	1	2	14	13	+1	1	2	5	9	16	−7

Last updated: 21 November 2026.
Source: Soccerway

==== Results by round ====
Round	1	2	3	4	5	6	7	8	9	10	11	12	13	14	15	16	17	18	19	20	21	22	23	24	25	26	27	28	29	30	31	32
Ground	H	A	A	H	H	A	A	H	A	H	A	H	H	A	A	H	A	H	H	A	H	A	A	H	H	A	A	H	H	A	A	H
Result	W	L	D	W	D	W	D	W	L	L	L	W	W	L	L	L																
Position	7	14	12	6	8	4	5	2	4	8	8	5	3	5	9	12																
Points	3	3	4	7	8	11	12	15	15	15	15	18	21	21	21	21																

Source: EFL
A = Away; H = Home; W = Win; D = Draw; L = Loss; P = Postponed

==== Matches ====
Win Draw Loss Fixtures

15 August 2026 1	Cheltenham Town	2–1	Rotherham United	Cheltenham
15:00 BST	McCann 30'; Tomkinson (yellow card) 38'; McWilliams (yellow card) 40'; Evans 71'; Sweeney (yellow card) 73'	Report	Spence (yellow card) 35'; Buyabu 62'	Stadium: EV Charger Points Stadium; Attendance: 4,467 (942 from Rotherham); Referee: Harry Wager

22 August 2026 2	Swindon Town	2–1	Cheltenham Town	Swindon
15:00 BST	Virtue (yellow card) 4'; Drinan 17'; Clarke 55'	Report	Broom 85'; Bickerstaff (yellow card) 90+2'	Stadium: The Nigel Eady County Ground; Attendance: 8,833 (999 from Cheltenham); Referee: Craig Hicks

29 August 2026 3	Barnet	2–2	Cheltenham Town	Edgware
12:30 BST	Lakin 11'; Cox (yellow card) 53'; Tshimanga 78' (pen.)	Report	Tomkinson (yellow card) 13'; McWilliams (yellow card) 38'; Broom 60'; McCann 64'; Willcox (yellow card) 76'	Stadium: The Hive Stadium; Referee: Abigail Byrne
Note: Fixture was initially scheduled for a 15:00 kick-off, but was brought forward for live Sky Sports.

1 September 2026 4	Cheltenham Town	3–2	York City	Cheltenham
19:45 BST	McWilliams (yellow card) 5'; McCann (penalty missed) 17', 86'; Evans 17', 65'	Report	Pearce 12'; Malcolm 73'	Stadium: EV Charger Points Stadium; Attendance: Steven Copeland; Referee: 3,928

5 September 2026 5	Cheltenham Town	2–2	Grimsby Town	Cheltenham
15:00 BST	McCann 12'; Tomkinson (yellow card) 28'; Weimann 41' (pen.)	Report	Shelton 47'; Green (yellow card) 79', (goal) 82'	Stadium: EV Charger Points Stadium; Attendance: 4,758; Referee: Dale Baines

12 September 2026 6	Crawley Town	1–3	Cheltenham Town	Crawley
12:30 BST	Morgan 7', (yellow card) 35'; Barker (yellow card) 42'; Arthurs (yellow card) 67'; Farquharson (yellow card) 72'		McCann 32', 54'; Weimann 35'; Evans (yellow card) 45'; Shipley (yellow card) 85'	Stadium: Broadfield Stadium; Referee: Ben Toner
Note: Fixture was initially scheduled for a 15:00 kick-off, but was brought forward for live Sky Sports.

19 September 2026 7	Colchester United	1–1	Cheltenham Town	Colchester
15:00 BST	Thorn (yellow card) 28'; Sesay 66'; Anderson (yellow card) 76'; Williams (red card) 83'; Iandolo (yellow card) 84'	Report	McWilliams (yellow card) 10'; Evans (yellow card) 18'; Weimann 78'; Tomkinson (yellow card) 85'; McCann (yellow card) 90+2'	Stadium: JobServe Community Stadium; Attendance: 4,433 (131 from Cheltenham); Referee: Alan Young

26 September 2026 8	Cheltenham Town	2–1	Chesterfield	Cheltenham
15:00 BST	Sweeney (yellow card) 12'; McCann 17'; Weimann 37', (yellow card) 84'; Shipley (yellow card) 55'; Willcox (yellow card) 89'	Report	Marsh 49'	Stadium: EV Charger Points Stadium; Attendance: 4,402; Referee: Dean Whitestone

3 October 2026 9	Accrington Stanley	2–0	Cheltenham Town	Accrington
15:00 BST	Walton (yellow card) 48'; Woods (yellow card) 74'; Warren 78', 87'; Tutonda (yellow card) 80'	Report	McCann (yellow card) 42' (yellow-red card) 90+3'; Weimann (yellow card) 90+5'	Stadium: Wham Stadium; Attendance: 2,127 (194 from Cheltenham); Referee: Jamie O'Connor

10 October 2026 10	Cheltenham Town	0–2	Salford City	Cheltenham
15:00 BST	Willcox (yellow card) 6'; Evans (yellow card) 20'; Tomkinson (yellow card) 57'; Shipley (yellow card) 64'; Stevenson (red card) 78'; Weimann (yellow card) 85'		Odoh (yellow card) 49'; Molyneux (yellow card) 56'; Aimson (yellow card) 71'; Grant 84', 90+3'; Garbutt (yellow card) 90+7'	Stadium: EV Charger Points Stadium; Attendance: 4,023; Referee: David Rock

17 October 2026 11	Oldham Athletic	4–1	Cheltenham Town	Oldham
15:00 BST	Kavanagh 19'; Robson 25', 81'; Fawunmi 41'	Report	McWilliams (yellow card) 18'; McCann (yellow card) 24'; Willcox 45+1'	Stadium: Boundary Park; Attendance: 6,361; Referee: Scott Oldham

20 October 2026 12	Cheltenham Town	4–2	Fleetwood Town	Cheltenham
19:45 BST	Lynch 17' (o.g.); Stevenson (yellow card) 20'; Otchere 25'; J. Evans 39'; Tomkinson (yellow card) 64'; Willcox 80'	Report	Murphy (yellow card) 11'; Rooney (yellow card) 31'; C. Evans 50', 65' (pen.); Bennett (yellow card) 89'	Stadium: EV Charger Points Stadium; Attendance: 2,923; Referee: Oliver Mackey

24 October 2026 13	Cheltenham Town	1–0	Newport County	Cheltenham
12:30 BST	McCann 5'; Evans (yellow card) 47'; Otchere 56'	Report	Garner (yellow card) 30'; Adu-Poku (yellow card) 38'; Smith (yellow card) 57'	Stadium: EV Charger Points Stadium; Attendance: 4,471; Referee: Ben Speedie
Note: Fixture was initially scheduled for a 15:00 kick-off, but was brought forward for live Sky Sports broadcasting.

31 October 2026 14	Tranmere Rovers	3–1	Cheltenham Town	Birkenhead
15:00 GMT	Jones 23', 39'; Turnbull (yellow card) 45+1'; Whitaker 45+3'; Conlon (yellow card) 60'	Report	McCann 1'; Evans (yellow card) 32'; Tomkinson (yellow card) 78'	Stadium: Prenton Park; Attendance: 6,110; Referee: Ross Martin

14 November 2026 15	Exeter City	1–0	Cheltenham Town	Exeter
12:30 GMT	Samuel 51'	Report	Wilson (yellow card) 40'; Otchere (yellow card) 45'	Stadium: St James Park; Attendance: 6,197 (405 from Cheltenham); Referee: Andrew Humphries
Note: Fixture was initially scheduled for a 15:00 kick-off, but was brought forward for live Sky Sports broadcasting.

21 November 2026 16	Cheltenham Town	0–3	Bristol Rovers	Cheltenham
15:00 GMT	Shipley (yellow card) 12'; McCann (penalty missed) 51'; Cundy (yellow card) 55'; McWilliams (red card) 64'	Report	Forde 3'; Kilgour (yellow card) 14'; Leigh (yellow card) 35'; Harrison 43'; James 47'; Balmer (yellow card) 81'	Stadium: EV Charger Points Stadium; Attendance: 5,235 (1,054 from Bristol); Referee: Gavin Ward

28 November 2026 17	Shrewsbury Town	v	Cheltenham Town	Shrewsbury
15:00 GMT				Stadium: Croud Meadow

1 December 2026 18	Cheltenham Town	v	Rochdale	Cheltenham
19:45 GMT				Stadium: EV Charger Points Stadium

12 December 2026 19	Cheltenham Town	v	Crewe Alexandra	Cheltenham
15:00 GMT				Stadium: EV Charger Points Stadium

19 December 2026 20	Gillingham	v	Cheltenham Town	Gillingham
15:00 GMT				Stadium: MEMS Priestfield Stadium

26 December 2026 21	Cheltenham Town	v	Port Vale	Cheltenham
15:00 GMT				Stadium: EV Charger Points Stadium

29 December 2026 22	Northampton Town	v	Cheltenham Town	Sixfields
19:45 GMT				Stadium: Sixfields Stadium

1 January 2027 23	Walsall	v	Cheltenham Town	Bescot
15:00 GMT				Stadium: Pallet-Track Bescot Stadium

9 January 2027 24	Cheltenham Town	v	Gillingham	Cheltenham
15:00 GMT				Stadium: EV Charger Points Stadium

16 January 2027 25	Cheltenham Town	v	Oldham Athletic	Cheltenham
15:00 GMT				Stadium: EV Charger Points Stadium

19 January 2027 26	Fleetwood Town	v	Cheltenham Town	Fleetwood
19:45 GMT				Stadium: Highbury Stadium

23 January 2027 27	Newport County	v	Cheltenham Town	Newport
15:00 GMT				Stadium: Rodney Parade

30 January 2027 28	Cheltenham Town	v	Tranmere Rovers	Cheltenham
15:00 GMT				Stadium: EV Charger Points Stadium

6 February 2027 29	Cheltenham Town	v	Barnet	Cheltenham
15:00 GMT				Stadium: EV Charger Points Stadium

9 February 2027 30	York City	v	Cheltenham Town	Huntington
19:45 GMT				Stadium: LNER Community Stadium

13 February 2027 31	Grimsby Town	v	Cheltenham Town	Cleethorpes
15:00 GMT				Stadium: Blundell Park

20 February 2027 32	Cheltenham Town	v	Crawley Town	Cheltenham
12:30 GMT				Stadium: EV Charger Points Stadium
Note: Fixture was initially scheduled for a 15:00 kick-off, but was brought forward for live Sky Sports broadcasting.

=== FA Cup ===
Cheltenham were drawn at home to FC Halifax Town in the first round and away to Chesterfield in the second round.

Win Draw Loss Fixtures

7 November 2026 First round	Cheltenham Town	2–0	FC Halifax Town	Cheltenham
15:00 GMT	Evans 16', (yellow card) 60'; Miller 90+3'	Report	Conte (yellow card) 60'; Gilsenan (yellow card) 88'	Stadium: EV Charger Points Stadium; Attendance: 2,961 (339 from Halifax); Referee: Oliver Yates

4–7 December 2026 Second round	Cheltenham Town	v	Chesterfield	Cheltenham
TBA GMT				Stadium: EV Charger Points Stadium

=== EFL Cup ===
Cheltenham were drawn at home to Charlton Athletic in the first round.

Win Draw Loss Fixtures

8 August 2026 First round	Cheltenham Town	1–3	Charlton Athletic	Cheltenham
17:30 BST	Miller 55'; Tomlinson (yellow card) 71'	Report	Godden 22'; Carey 24'; Campbell 37'	Stadium: EV Charger Points Stadium; Attendance: 3,119 (816 from Charlton); Referee: Alan Dale

=== EFL Trophy ===
==== Group stage ====
Cheltenham were drawn against Oxford United, Exeter City and Tottenham Hotspur into Southern Group A.

Pos	Div	Team	Pld	W	PW	PL	L	GF	GA	GD	Pts	Qualification
1	L2	Exeter City (A)	3	1	1	1	0	6	4	+2	6	Advance to Round 2
2	L1	Oxford United	2	1	0	1	0	6	2	+4	4	Advance to Round 2
3	L2	Cheltenham Town (E)	3	0	2	0	1	4	8	−4	4	
4	ACA	Tottenham Hotspur U21	2	0	0	1	1	2	4	−2	1	

Updated to match(es) played on 10 November 2026. Source: EFL
(A) Advances to a further round; (E) Eliminated

Win Draw Loss Fixtures

22 September 2026 Group stage	Cheltenham Town	2–2 (4–3 p)	Exeter City	Cheltenham
19:00 BST	Bickerstaff 45+1'; Miller 89' (pen.)	Report	James (yellow card) 13'; Gordon 77'; Cummins 86'; Sutherland (red card) 90+7'	Stadium: EV Charger Points Stadium; Attendance: 1,242 (121 from Exeter); Referee: Emily Heaslip
	Penalties
	Nurse (penalty scored); Otchere (penalty missed); Bickerstaff (penalty scored); Broom (penalty scored); Miller (penalty scored)		Gordon (penalty missed); Samuel (penalty scored); Woodhouse (penalty scored); Cummins (penalty scored); Perry (penalty missed)

13 October 2026 Group stage	Cheltenham Town	2–2 (7–6 p)	Tottenham Hotspur U21	Cheltenham
19:00 BST	Miller 45+1', 90+5'; Stevenson (yellow card) 68'		Richarlison 56'; Adewole 73'; Archer (yellow card) 90+5'	Stadium: EV Charger Points Stadium; Attendance: 1,731; Referee: Ollie Yates
	Penalties
	Bickerstaff (penalty scored); Nurse (penalty missed); Otchere (penalty scored); Evans (penalty scored); Miller (penalty scored); Shipley (penalty scored); Weimann (penalty missed); Stevenson (penalty scored); Willcox (penalty scored)		(penalty scored) Adewole; (penalty scored) Dorrington; (penalty scored) Sowunmi; (penalty missed) Byrne; (penalty scored) Richarlison; (penalty scored) Lehane; (penalty missed) Hardy; (penalty scored) King; (penalty missed) Byfield

10 November 2026 Group stage	Oxford United	4–0	Cheltenham Town	Littlemore
19:00 GMT	Snowden 59'; O'Donkor 74', 90'; Jeon Jin-woo 82'	Report		Stadium: Kassam Stadium; Attendance: 860 (147 from Cheltenham); Referee: Matthew Russell

== Statistics ==
=== Appearances and goals ===
As of match played 21 November 2026

Players with no appearances are not included on the list; italics indicate a loaned in player

No.	Pos	Nat	Player	Total		League Two		FA Cup		EFL Cup		EFL Trophy	
No.	Pos	Nat	Player	Apps	Goals	Apps	Goals	Apps	Goals	Apps	Goals	Apps	Goals
1	GK	(England) ENG	Joe Day	4	0	0+0	0	0+0	0	1+0	0	3+0	0
3	DF	(United States) USA	Jonathan Tomkinson	18	0	15+0	0	1+0	0	1+0	0	1+0	0
4	DF	(England) ENG	Joe Tomlinson	10	0	8+1	0	0+0	0	1+0	0	0+0	0
5	DF	(England) ENG	Robbie Cundy	15	0	11+1	0	0+1	0	1+0	0	1+0	0
6	DF	(Wales) WAL	James Wilson	14	0	8+3	0	1+0	0	0+0	0	2+0	0
7	MF	(England) ENG	Ben Stevenson	18	0	14+1	0	1+0	0	1+0	0	1+0	0
8	MF	(Northern Ireland) NIR	Charlie McCann	19	9	16+0	9	1+0	0	1+0	0	1+0	0
9	FW	(England) ENG	Kirsten Otchere	18	1	6+8	1	1+0	0	0+1	0	2+0	0
10	FW	(England) ENG	George Miller	14	5	1+8	0	0+1	1	1+0	1	3+0	3
11	FW	(Wales) WAL	Jake Bickerstaff	16	1	0+12	0	0+0	0	0+1	0	3+0	1
14	MF	(Wales) WAL	Ryan Broom	16	2	7+6	2	0+0	0	0+1	0	2+0	0
17	MF	(England) ENG	Shaun McWilliams	13	0	10+0	0	1+0	0	1+0	0	1+0	0
18	FW	(Austria) AUT	Andreas Weimann	17	4	13+2	4	1+0	0	0+0	0	0+1	0
19	FW	(England) ENG	Jake Evans	17	5	14+1	4	1+0	1	0+0	0	0+1	0
20	FW	(England) ENG	Favour Onukwuli	3	0	0+1	0	0+0	0	0+1	0	1+0	0
21	DF	(England) ENG	George Nurse	16	0	3+8	0	0+1	0	1+0	0	3+0	0
23	GK	(England) ENG	Wyll Stanway	18	0	16+0	0	1+0	0	0+1	0	0+0	0
25	DF	(Republic of Ireland) IRL	Pierce Sweeney	18	0	14+1	0	1+0	0	1+0	0	1+0	0
26	MF	(Republic of Ireland) IRL	Jordan Shipley	19	0	15+1	0	1+0	0	1+0	0	0+1	0
31	GK	(England) ENG	Mamadou Diallo	1	0	0+0	0	0+0	0	0+0	0	0+1	0
32	FW	(England) ENG	Sopuruchukwu Obieri	1	0	0+0	0	0+0	0	0+0	0	0+1	0
33	DF	(England) ENG	Freddy Willcox	17	2	5+8	2	0+1	0	0+0	0	2+1	0
34	MF	(England) ENG	Harry Tustin	1	0	0+0	0	0+0	0	0+0	0	1+0	0
35	DF	(England) ENG	Mark Barber	2	0	0+0	0	0+0	0	0+0	0	2+0	0
36	FW	(England) ENG	Archie Hill	2	0	0+0	0	0+0	0	0+0	0	2+0	0
38	MF	(England) ENG	Jack Robinson	2	0	0+0	0	0+0	0	0+0	0	1+1	0
39	MF	(England) ENG	Noah Carter	1	0	0+0	0	0+0	0	0+0	0	0+1	0

=== Disciplinary record ===
As of match played 21 November 2026

Includes all competitive matches. The list is sorted by squad number when disciplinary points / points per card / number of cards are equal. Players with no cards not included in the list.

Rank	No.	Pos.	Nat.	Name	League Two			FA Cup			EFL Cup			EFL Trophy			Total		
Rank	No.	Pos.	Nat.	Name	Yellow card	Second yellow card	Red card	Yellow card	Second yellow card	Red card	Yellow card	Second yellow card	Red card	Yellow card	Second yellow card	Red card	Yellow card	Second yellow card	Red card
1	17	CDM	(England)	Shaun McWilliams	5	0	1	0	0	0	0	0	0	0	0	0	5	0	1
2	3	CB	(United States)	Jonathan Tomkinson	7	0	0	0	0	0	0	0	0	0	0	0	7	0	0
3	19	CF	(England)	Jake Evans	5	0	0	1	0	0	0	0	0	0	0	0	6	0	0
4	7	CDM	(England)	Ben Stevenson	1	0	1	0	0	0	0	0	0	1	0	0	2	0	1
5	8	CDM	(England)	Charlie McCann	2	1	0	0	0	0	0	0	0	0	0	0	2	1	0
5	26	LM	(Republic of Ireland)	Jordan Shipley	4	0	0	0	0	0	0	0	0	0	0	0	4	0	0
7	18	CF	(Austria)	Andreas Weimann	3	0	0	0	0	0	0	0	0	0	0	0	3	0	0
7	33	LB	(England)	Freddy Willcox	3	0	0	0	0	0	0	0	0	0	0	0	3	0	0
9	9	CF	(England)	Kirsten Otchere	2	0	0	0	0	0	0	0	0	0	0	0	2	0	0
9	25	CB	(Republic of Ireland)	Pierce Sweeney	2	0	0	0	0	0	0	0	0	0	0	0	2	0	0
11	4	LWB	(England)	Joe Tomlinson	0	0	0	0	0	0	1	0	0	0	0	0	1	0	0
11	5	CB	(England)	Robbie Cundy	1	0	0	0	0	0	0	0	0	0	0	0	1	0	0
11	6	CB	(Wales)	James Wilson	1	0	0	0	0	0	0	0	0	0	0	0	1	0	0
11	11	CF	(Wales)	Jake Bickerstaff	1	0	0	0	0	0	0	0	0	0	0	0	1	0	0
Total					37	1	2	1	0	0	1	0	0	1	0	0	40	1	2

== Awards ==
=== Player awards ===
==== EFL League Two Player of the Month ====
Month	Player	Result	Ref.
September	(Northern Ireland) Charlie McCann	Won	

==== PFA League Two Fans' Player of the Month ====
Month	Player	Result	Ref.
September	(Austria) Andreas Weimann	Won	
September	(Northern Ireland) Charlie McCann	Nominated	

=== Manager awards ===
==== EFL League Two Manager of the Month ====
Month	Manager	Result	Ref.
September	(England) Steve Cotterill	Nominated	
