= Keith Knight =

Keith Knight may refer to:

- Keith Knight (cartoonist) (born 1966), American cartoonist and musician
- Keith Knight (actor) (1956–2007), Canadian actor/voice actor
- Keith Knight (footballer) (born 1969), English footballer
