= Kirsten Otchere =

English footballer (born 2006)

Personal information
- Full name: Kirsten Fiifi Yamoah Otchere
- Date of birth: 6 October 2006 (age 20)
- Height: 1.78 m (5 ft 10 in)
- Position: Forward

Team information
- Current team: Cheltenham Town (on loan from Leicester City)
- Number: 9

Youth career
- –2026: Leicester City

Senior career*
Years	Team	Apps	(Gls)
2026–	Leicester City	0	(0)
2026–	→ Cheltenham Town (loan)	13	(1)
- * Club domestic league appearances and goals as of 15:21, 15 November 2026 (UTC)

Kirsten Fiifi Yamoah Otchere (born 6 October 2006) is an English professional footballer who plays as a forward for EFL League Two club Cheltenham Town, on loan from EFL League One club Leicester City.

Otchere signed his first professional contract in September 2025.

== Career ==
Otchere joined the Leicester City youth system at the under-9s level. After scoring 5 goals in 9 games for the under-18s, he made his under-21 debut on 8 January 2024 at age 16. He signed his first professional contract on 5 September 2025.

During the 2026–27 preseason, Otchere scored three goals for the first team. On 4 August 2026, Otchere was subsequently sent on a season-long loan to EFL League Two club Cheltenham Town. He made his professional debut four days later, coming on as a 65th-minute substitute for George Miller during a 1–3 defeat to Charlton Athletic in the first round of the EFL Cup. He scored his first professional goal in a 4–2 victory against Fleetwood Town on 20 October 2026.

== Personal life ==
Otchere is of Ghanaian ancestry.

== Career statistics ==
As of match played 14 November 2026

Appearances and goals by club, season and competition
Club	Season	League			FA Cup		EFL Cup		Other		Total	
Club	Season	Division	Apps	Goals	Apps	Goals	Apps	Goals	Apps	Goals	Apps	Goals
Leicester City	2026–27	League One	0	0	0	0	0	0	0	0	0	0
Cheltenham Town (loan)	2026–27	League Two	13	1	1	0	1	0	2 (Note: Appearance(s) in EFL Trophy)	0	17	1
Career total			13	1	1	0	1	0	2	0	17	1
