= Keith Knight (footballer) =

English footballer

Personal information
- Date of birth: 16 February 1969 (age 57)
- Place of birth: Cheltenham, England
- Position: Midfielder

Team information
- Current team: Cirencester Town

Senior career*
Years	Team	Apps	(Gls)
–1988	Cheltenham Town		
1988–1990	Reading	43	(8)
1990–1991	Gloucester City	?	
	BV Veendam	?	
	Trowbridge Town	?	
	→ Yeovil Town (loan)	?	
1994–1996	Gloucester City	?	
1996	Cheltenham Town (loan)	?	
	Halesowen Town	?	
?–1999	Cheltenham Town	?	
1999–?	Worcester City	?	
	Witney Town	?	
	Clevedon Town	?	
	Swindon Supermarine	?	
?–2003	Cirencester Town	?	
2003–2006	Gloucester City	81	(6)
2006–2007	Cinderford Town	?	
2007	Swindon Supermarine	?	
2009–?	Cirencester Town	0	(0)
	Shurdington Rovers	1	(0)

Managerial career
- 2007: Cinderford Town
- * Club domestic league appearances and goals

Keith Knight (born 16 February 1969) is an English footballer. He plays in either right wing back or midfield positions. He played professionally in the Football League for Reading and in the Netherlands for BV Veendam. He represented England seven times at Under-18 level and played for the England National Game XI in the 1993–94 and 1995–96 seasons.

Knight began his career as a junior with Cheltenham Town, then managed by John Murphy, before joining Reading in September 1988 for a fee of £7,000. He picked up England caps at youth level and scored on his Reading debut, against Southend United. He was later on the verge of joining Sunderland, but the deal fell through as Knight required a hernia operation. On his release by Reading he joined Gloucester City, then managed by Brian Godfrey, but stayed only a short time before being offered a professional contract by Dutch side BV Veendam.

On his return to England, Knight was signed again by Murphy, by now in charge of Trowbridge Town. He had a loan spell with Yeovil Town before following Murphy to Gloucester City in August 1994. He joined Cheltenham Town on loan in the 1996–97 season and moved to Halesowen Town in October 1996. He later rejoined Cheltenham where he was a member of their side that won the FA Trophy in 1998 and the Conference and with it promotion to the Football League in 1999.

Knight didn't follow Cheltenham into the League, moving to Worcester City in the 1999 close season. he subsequently played for Witney Town, Clevedon Town, Swindon Supermarine and Cirencester Town before rejoining Gloucester City in June 2003 as player-coach.

He left in January 2006 to join Cinderford Town, initially as a player, before becoming player-coach and stepping up to player-manager in July 2007. However, he resigned as Cindeford manager on 3 October 2007.

He rejoined Swindon Supermarine in October 2007.

In November 2011, Knight featured for Cheltenham based amateur side Shurdington Rovers at the age of 42.
