= George Miller (footballer, born 1998) =

English footballer

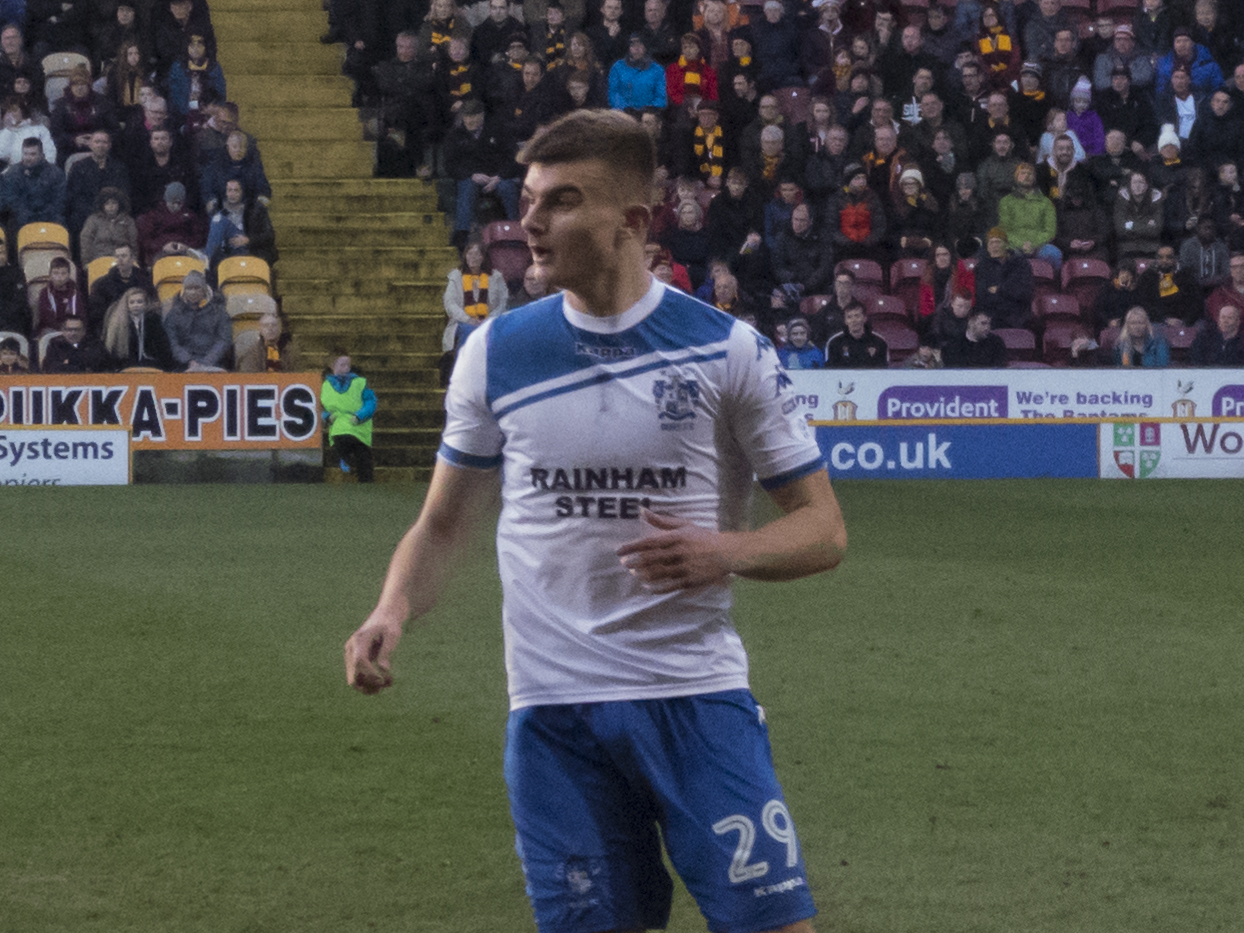
- Miller in 2016

Personal information
- Full name: George Miller
- Date of birth: 11 August 1998 (age 28)
- Place of birth: Bolton, England
- Height: 1.78 m (5 ft 10 in)
- Position: Forward

Team information
- Current team: Cheltenham Town
- Number: 10

Youth career
- 2014–2016: Bury

Senior career*
Years	Team	Apps	(Gls)
2016–2017	Bury	29	(7)
2016	→ Witton Albion (loan)	2	(1)
2017–2019	Middlesbrough	0	(0)
2017–2018	→ Wrexham (loan)	5	(0)
2018	→ Bury (loan)	19	(8)
2018–2019	→ Bradford City (loan)	28	(3)
2019–2022	Barnsley	6	(0)
2019	→ Bradford City (loan)	11	(0)
2019–2020	→ Scunthorpe United (loan)	15	(1)
2021–2022	→ Walsall (loan)	41	(12)
2022–2024	Doncaster Rovers	36	(11)
2024–	Cheltenham Town	77	(16)
- * Club domestic league appearances and goals as of 20:48, 15 November 2026 (UTC)

George Miller (born 11 August 1998) is an English professional footballer who plays as a forward for Cheltenham Town.

== Early life ==
He is the nephew of referee Mark Halsey.

== Club career ==
=== Bury ===
Miller joined the Bury youth set-up in April 2014. He made his League One debut for the Shakers on 7 February 2016, coming on as a 60th-minute substitute for Reece Brown in a 3–0 defeat to Barnsley at Oakwell.

He had a brief loan at Witton Albion, making two appearances and scoring one goal for the club. On 29 October 2016, he scored his first goal for Bury in a 3–2 defeat against Northampton Town.

=== Middlesbrough ===
On 14 July 2017, Miller signed a three-year contract with EFL Championship club, Middlesbrough, following a successful previous season with his former club Bury. Miller went on to make his debut for his new club on 19 September 2017 in a 2–0 victory over Aston Villa in the third round of the EFL Cup, coming on as a late substitute for Ashley Fletcher at Villa Park. On 5 December 2017, he signed for National League side Wrexham on a month-long loan, going on to make six appearances for the club. On 19 January 2018, Middlesbrough announced that Miller would rejoin his former club Bury on loan until the end of the season, despite reported interest from Wrexham to resign their former loanee.

On 16 July 2018, Bradford City announced that Miller had joined the club on loan for the 2018–19 season.

=== Barnsley ===
On 31 January 2019 Miller was signed by Barnsley for a fee of £200,000 and immediately loaned back to Bradford City until the end of the 2018–19 season. A few days later, he was announced as the winner of the December 2018 EFL Young Player of the Month award.

Miller made his EFL Championship debut for Barnsley as a late substitute against Fulham on Saturday 3 August 2019 in a 1–0 win. However, first-team opportunities remained limited and on 22 August 2019, it was announced Miller was heading out on loan again, this time joining League Two side Scunthorpe United on a season-long loan deal.

Miller made just six substitute appearances for Barnsley in the 2020–21 season and on 31 August 2021 moved out on loan again, joining League Two side Walsall on a season-long loan deal.

=== Doncaster Rovers ===
On 20 June 2022, Miller signed for recently relegated League Two club Doncaster Rovers on a three-year contract following his release from Barnsley, becoming the club’s new No. 9 ahead of the 2022–23 League Two season.

During the 2022–23 campaign, he was a key contributor in League Two, scoring regularly and finishing the season with double-figure goals in all competitions. His goals included crucial strikes such as a winning goal against Rochdale in October 2022.

On the 8 August 2023 Miller scored two goals against Hull City to help Doncaster secure a victory in the EFL Cup.

The following season was disrupted by injury, with Miller missing much of the 2023–24 campaign due to a serious knee issue. He made a comeback late in the season, featuring as a substitute in the League Two play-off semi-final second leg against Crewe Alexandra.

Miller returned to Doncaster for pre-season ahead of the 2024–25 campaign, participating in training and friendly matches as he prepared for the season. However, in August 2024, he departed Doncaster Rovers to join Cheltenham Town for an undisclosed fee.

=== Cheltenham Town ===
In August 2024, Miller joined League Two side Cheltenham Town for an undisclosed fee. Despite missing the opening three months of the 2025-26 season through injury, Miller scored seven goals following his return. At the end of the season, he signed a new contract with Cheltenham Town, remaining at the club beyond the 2025-26 campaign. He was one of four players offered new contracts, alongside Ryan Broom, Harry Tustin and Freddy Wilcox.

== Career statistics ==
As of match played 14 November 2026

Appearances and goals by club, season and competition
Club	Season	Division	League		FA Cup		League Cup		Other		Total	
Club	Season	Division	Apps	Goals	Apps	Goals	Apps	Goals	Apps	Goals	Apps	Goals
Bury	2015–16	League One	1	0	0	0	0	0	0	0	1	0
Bury	2016–17	League One	28	7	2	0	0	0	1 (Note: Appearance(s) in EFL Trophy)	1	31	8
Bury	Total		29	7	2	0	0	0	1	1	32	8
Witton Albion (loan)	2016–17	NPL Division One South	2	1	0	0	–		0	0	2	1
Middlesbrough	2017–18	Championship	0	0	0	0	1	0	0	0	1	0
Middlesbrough	2018–19	Championship	0	0	0	0	0	0	2	0	2	0
Middlesbrough	Total		0	0	0	0	1	0	2	0	3	0
Wrexham (loan)	2017–18	National League	5	0	0	0	–		1 (Note: Appearance in the FA Trophy.)	0	6	0
Bury (loan)	2017–18	League One	19	8	0	0	0	0	0	0	19	8
Bradford City (loan)	2018–19	League One	39	3	4	2	1	0	1	1	45	6
Barnsley	2019–20	Championship	1	0	0	0	1	0	0	0	2	0
Barnsley	2020–21	Championship	5	0	1	0	0	0	0	0	6	0
Barnsley	2021–22	Championship	0	0	0	0	1	0	0	0	1	0
Barnsley	Total		6	0	1	0	2	0	0	0	9	0
Scunthorpe United (loan)	2019–20	League Two	15	1	0	0	0	0	4	0	19	1
Walsall (loan)	2021–22	League Two	41	12	2	0	0	0	4	0	47	12
Doncaster Rovers	2022–23	League Two	34	11	1	0	0	0	2	2	37	13
Doncaster Rovers	2023–24	League Two	2	0	0	0	1	2	1 (Note: Appearance in the League Two Play-Offs)	0	4	2
Doncaster Rovers	2024–25	League Two	0	0	0	0	0	0	0	0	0	0
Doncaster Rovers	Total		36	11	1	0	1	2	3	2	41	15
Cheltenham Town	2024–25	League Two	40	9	2	0	1	0	3	2	46	11
Cheltenham Town	2025–26	League Two	29	7	0	0	2	0	1	0	32	7
Cheltenham Town	2026–27	League Two	8	0	1	1	1	1	3	3	13	5
Cheltenham Town	Total		77	16	3	1	4	1	7	5	91	23
Career total			269	59	13	3	9	3	23	9	314	74
