= Charlie McCann =

Northern Irish footballer

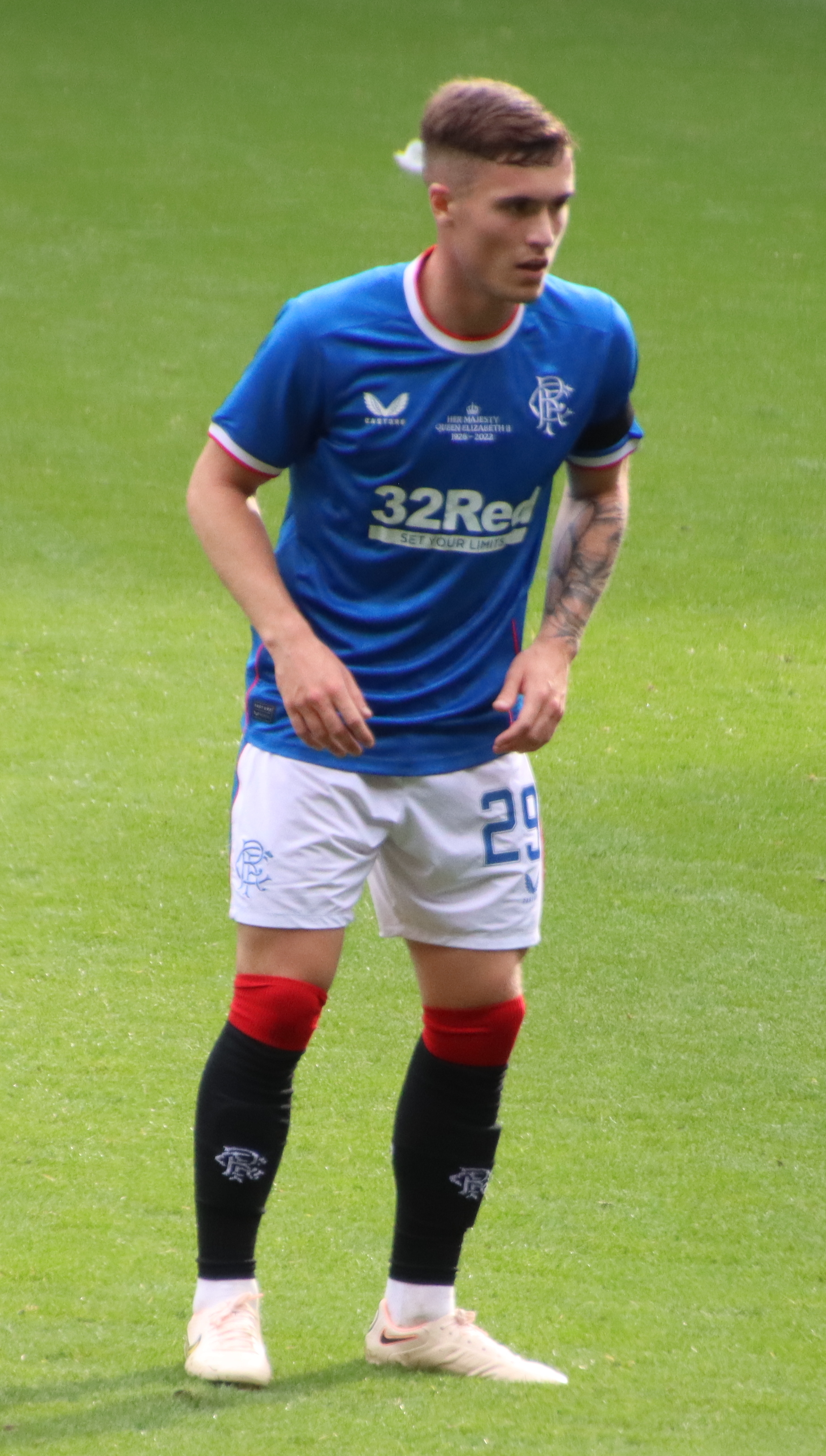
- McCann in 2022

Personal information
- Full name: Charlie Liam McCann
- Date of birth: 24 April 2002 (age 24)
- Place of birth: Coventry, England
- Height: 1.73 m (5 ft 8 in)
- Position: Midfielder

Team information
- Current team: Cheltenham Town
- Number: 8

Youth career
- –2017: Coventry City
- 2017–2021: Manchester United
- 2021: Rangers

Senior career*
Years	Team	Apps	(Gls)
2021–2023	Rangers	3	(0)
2023–2025	Forest Green Rovers	82	(15)
2025–2026	Barrow	34	(5)
2026–	Cheltenham Town	15	(9)

International career^{‡}
2017	England U16	1	(0)
2019	Republic of Ireland U17	3	(1)
2019	Republic of Ireland U18	3	(0)
2022–2023	Northern Ireland U21	7	(0)
- * Club domestic league appearances and goals as of 22:45, 21 November 2026 (UTC) ‡ National team caps and goals as of 08:47, 1 October 2025 (UTC)

Charlie Liam McCann (born 24 April 2002) is a professional footballer who plays as a midfielder for EFL League Two club Cheltenham Town. Born in England, he represented Northern Ireland at youth level.

== Club career ==
Born in Coventry, McCann began his career with Coventry City before joining the Manchester United Academy at the age of 16. After four seasons with Manchester United, he joined Rangers on 30 July 2021, signing a three-year deal. The transfer fee paid by Rangers could reportedly rise to £750,000. McCann was initially part of Rangers' B team, competing in the Lowland Football League; however, he soon progressed to the senior squad. On 12 February 2022, he made his professional debut in a Scottish Cup match away to Annan Athletic as a 70th-minute substitute for Amad. A further substitute appearance in the Scottish Cup followed a month later on 13 March. McCann made his league debut for Rangers by replacing Borna Barišić as a 66th-minute substitute during a 2–0 win over Dundee United on 8 May 2022.

On 24 January 2023, McCann signed for League One bottom side Forest Green Rovers for an undisclosed fee on a long-term contract. On 6 August 2025, McCann left the club by mutual consent.

On 30 September 2025, McCann signed for League Two club Barrow on an initial contract until the end of the 2026–27 season, with the option of a further twelve months.

On 18 June 2026, McCann signed for League Two club Cheltenham Town, for an undisclosed fee that the club described as "nominal". He was named EFL League Two Player of the Month for September 2026 having scored five goals in as many matches.

== International career ==
Although he was born in England, McCann is eligible to play for both Irish national football teams. He was previously included in Republic of Ireland U17 and Republic of Ireland U19 squads. In March 2022, McCann switched allegiance to Northern Ireland and was selected for the Under-21 team. On 27 May 2022, McCann was called up to the senior squad for their Nations League games in June 2022.

== Career statistics ==
=== Club ===
As of match played 21 November 2026

Appearances and goals by club, season and competition
Club	Season	League			National cup (Note: Includes Scottish Cup and FA Cup)		League cup (Note: Includes Scottish League Cup and EFL Cup)		Continental		Other		Total	
Club	Season	Division	Apps	Goals	Apps	Goals	Apps	Goals	Apps	Goals	Apps	Goals	Apps	Goals
Manchester United U21	2020–21	—			—		—		—		3 (Note: Appearance(s) in EFL Trophy)	1	3	1
Rangers B	2021–22	—			—		—		—		4 (Note: Appearance(s) in Scottish Challenge Cup)	0	4	0
Rangers B	2022–23	—			—		—		—		2	1	2	1
Rangers B	Total		—		—		—		—		6	1	6	1
Rangers	2021–22	Scottish Premiership	2	0	2	0	0	0	0	0	—		4	0
Rangers	2022–23	Scottish Premiership	1	0	0	0	3	0	0	0	—		4	0
Rangers	Total		3	0	2	0	3	0	0	0	—		8	0
Forest Green Rovers	2022–23	League One	3	0	—		—		—		—		3	0
Forest Green Rovers	2023–24	League Two	41	4	3	0	1	0	—		2	0	47	4
Forest Green Rovers	2024–25	National League	38	11	1	0	—		—		2 (Note: One appearance in FA Trophy; One appearance in National League play-offs)	0	41	11
Forest Green Rovers	Total		82	15	4	0	1	0	—		4	0	91	15
Barrow	2025–26	League Two	34	5	2	0	0	0	—		2	0	38	5
Cheltenham Town	2026–27	League Two	15	9	1	0	1	0	—		1	0	18	9
Career total			134	29	9	0	5	0	0	0	16	2	164	31

== Honours ==
Individual

- EFL League Two Player of the Month: September 2026
