= Jonathan Tomkinson =

American soccer player (born 2002)

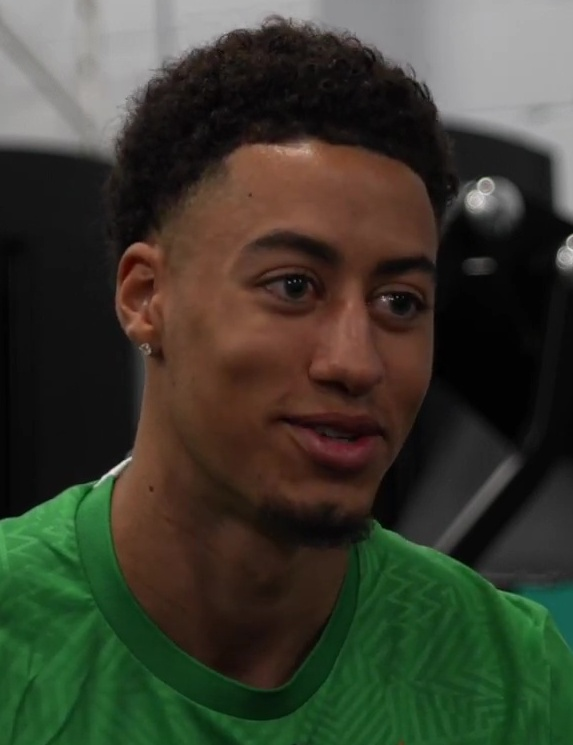
- Tomkinson in 2023

Personal information
- Full name: Jonathan Robert Tomkinson
- Date of birth: April 11, 2002 (age 24)
- Place of birth: Plano, Texas, United States
- Height: 6 ft 4 in (1.92 m)
- Position: Defender

Team information
- Current team: Cheltenham Town
- Number: 3

Youth career
- FC Dallas
- Solar SC
- 2019–2022: Norwich City

Senior career*
Years	Team	Apps	(Gls)
2022–2025	Norwich City	1	(0)
2023	→ Stevenage (loan)	7	(0)
2023–2024	→ Bradford City (loan)	23	(0)
2025	→ Ross County (loan)	13	(0)
2025–	Cheltenham Town	50	(1)

International career^{‡}
2019	United States U17		
2023–2024	United States U23	7	(0)
- * Club domestic league appearances and goals as of 20:17, November 22, 2026 (UTC) ‡ National team caps and goals as of 16:20, June 11, 2024 (UTC)

Jonathan Robert Tomkinson (born April 11, 2002) is an American professional soccer player who plays as a central defender for EFL League Two club Cheltenham Town.

== Early life ==
Tomkinson was born on 11 April, 2001 to an English father and an American mother. Born in Plano, Texas, United States, he is a native of the city.

== Career ==
=== Norwich City ===
Tomkinson is a former United States youth international. He was formerly a midfielder and even spent a season on the wing playing for the FC Dallas Academy team before moving back in an emergency when a shortage of center-backs arose. It was during the 2019–20 season that Tomkinson began playing for Norwich City Under-18s. He signed a professional contract for Norwich City in January 2022.

Tomkinson made his professional debut on August 9, 2022, in Norwich's EFL Cup first round match at home to Birmingham City. He conceded an own goal as the match ended 2–2, with Norwich winning following a penalty shoot-out.

On January 13, 2023, Tomkinson joined League Two side Stevenage on loan for the remainder of the 2022–23 season.

He signed for Bradford City on loan in September 2023.

On January 16, 2025, Tomkinson joined Scottish Premiership side Ross County on loan until the end of the season. On April 28, Norwich announced that Tomkinson would be released after the expiration of his contract at the end of the 2024–25 season.

=== Cheltenham Town ===
On October 10, 2025, Tomkinson joined League Two club Cheltenham Town on a deal until the end of the season.

On 5 May 2026, the Cheltenham Town exercised Tomkinson's contract option for the 2026–27 season following his first campaign with the club.

== International career ==
Having previously represented the United States at under-17 level, Tomkinson was called up to the United States under-23 national team on October 8, 2023, ahead of friendlies against Mexico and Japan.

== Style of play ==
Tomkinson plays as a defender. Initially, he played as a midfielder as a youth player.

== Career statistics ==
As of match played November 21, 2026

Appearances and goals by club, season and competition
Club	Season	League			National Cup (Note: Includes FA Cup and Scottish Cup)		League Cup (Note: Includes EFL Cup and Scottish League Cup)		Other		Total	
Club	Season	Division	Apps	Goals	Apps	Goals	Apps	Goals	Apps	Goals	Apps	Goals
Norwich City U21	2020–21	—			—		—		4 (Note: Appearances in the EFL Trophy)	0	4	0
Norwich City	2022–23	Championship	1	0	—		2	0	—		3	0
Norwich City	2023–24	Championship	0	0	0	0	0	0	—		0	0
Norwich City	2024–25	Championship	0	0	0	0	0	0	—		0	0
Norwich City	Total		1	0	0	0	2	0	0	0	3	0
Stevenage (loan)	2022–23	League Two	7	0	1	0	—		—		8	0
Bradford City (loan)	2023–24	League Two	23	0	0	0	0	0	5	0	28	0
Ross County (loan)	2024–25	Scottish Premiership	13	0	—		—		—		13	0
Cheltenham Town	2025–26	League Two	35	1	3	0	—		0	0	38	1
Cheltenham Town	2026–27	League Two	15	0	1	0	1	0	1	0	18	0
Cheltenham Town	Total		50	1	4	0	1	0	1	0	56	1
Career total			94	1	5	0	3	0	10	0	112	1
