= 1998 FA Trophy final =

1998 FA Trophy Final
- Event: 1997–98 FA Trophy
Cheltenham Town	Southport
1	0
- Date: 17 May 1998
- Venue: Wembley Stadium, London
- Man of the Match: Brian Butler (Southport)
- Referee: Gary Willard (Sussex)
- Attendance: 26,837

The 1998 FA Trophy Final was the 29th final of the FA Trophy, the Football Association's cup competition for levels 5–8 of the English football league system. It was contested by Cheltenham Town and Southport on 17 May 1998 at Wembley, London.

Cheltenham Town won the match 1–0 to win the first major silverware in the club's history.

== Match ==
=== Details ===
17 May 1998
15:00 BST

Cheltenham Town	1–0	Southport
Eaton 79'	Report

Wembley Stadium, London
Attendance: 26,837
Referee: Gary Willard (Sussex)

Cheltenham Town	Southport

GK	(England) Steve Book
RB	(Northern Ireland) Michael Duff
CB	(England) Mark Freeman
CB	(England) Chris Banks
LB	(England) Jamie Victory
RM	(England) Keith Knight	(substituted off) 77'
CM	(Australia) Lee Howells
CM	(England) Bob Bloomer
LM	(England) Clive Walker	(substituted off) 77'
RF	(England) Jason Eaton
LF	(England) Dale Watkins
Substitutes:
MF	(England) Darren Wright
MF	(England) Russell Milton	(substituted on) 77'
FW	(Scotland) Jimmy Smith	(substituted on) 77'
Manager:
(England) Steve Cotterill

GK	(England) Billy Stewart
RB	(England) Phil Horner
CB	(England) Paul Futcher
CB	(England) Andy Farley
LB	(England) Tim Ryan
RM	(England) Brian Butler
CM	(England) David Thompson	(substituted off) 86'
CM	(England) Ged Kielty
LM	(England) David Gamble
RF	(England) Kevin Formby	(substituted off) 80'
LF	(England) Brian Ross
Substitutes:
FW	(England) Paul Mitten
FW	(England) Andy Whittaker	(substituted on) 80'
DF	(England) Phil Bolland	(substituted on) 86'
Player Manager:
(England) Paul Futcher

Man of the match

- Brian Butler (Southport)

Match rules

- 90 minutes.
- 30 minutes of extra time if necessary.
- Penalty shootout if scores still level.
- Three named substitutes.
- Maximum of two substitutions.
