= Cliff Thorley =

English footballer (1916–2006)

Cliff Thorley (born 1916)
Personal information
- Full name: Ernest Thorley
- Date of birth: 17 January 1916
- Place of birth: Wath, England
- Date of death: 2006
- Place of death: Bradford, West Yorkshire, England
- Height: 5 ft 10 in (1.78 m)
- Position: Forward

Senior career*
Years	Team	Apps	(Gls)
1932	Frickley Colliery		
1932–1934	Sunderland	1	(0)
1934–1936	Hull City	36	(5)
1936–1937	Kidderminster Harriers		
1937–1938	Cheltenham Town	37	(13)
1938–1939	Bristol City	15	(3)
- * Club domestic league appearances and goals

Ernest 'Cliff' Thorley (17 January 1916 – 2006) was an English professional footballer who played as a forward and winger. He most notably played in the Football League for Sunderland, Hull City and Bristol City.

== Playing career ==
Thorley was born in Wath, and began his football career with Frickley Colliery, before turning professional with Sunderland at age 17.

Whilst playing for Frickley he captained Yorkshire and represented his county on multiple occasions. One year later he joined Hull City, and then played for Kidderminster Harriers in the Birmingham league before joining Cheltenham Town.

Thorley was a very popular player in Cheltenham. He played in 37 of 38 League and Cup matches—missing only one because of a severe cold—and scoring 13 times. Wrote the Gloucestershire Echo, "One of the fastest wingers ever to assist Cheltenham Town, Thorley is the possessor of a devastating shot which, with his remarkable speed, has caused defences many anxious times." Thorley, then 22, was transferred to Bristol City in 1938.

In 1939, he made a shock decision to retire from professional football at a young age to become a policeman in Huddersfield. In 1942, he played in the Inter-Allied Services Cup, a wartime football competition involving British serviceman, police and firefighters. Other members of the police squad were Jack Nicholas, Bob Brocklebank, and Tom Smith.
