= Charlie Barnett (cricketer) =

English cricketer

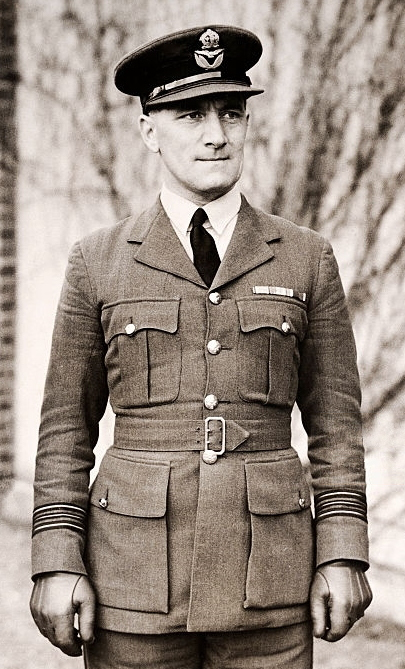
- Pilot Officer Charles Barnett c. 1940

Personal information
- Born: 3 July 1910; Cheltenham, Gloucestershire, England
- Died: 28 May 1993 (aged 82); Stroud, Gloucestershire, England
- Batting: Right-handed
- Bowling: Right-arm medium

International information
- National side: England
- Test debut: 12 August 1933 v West Indies
- Last Test: 10 June 1948 v Australia

Career statistics
| Competition | Test | First-class |
|---|---|---|
| Matches | 20 | 498 |
| Runs scored | 1,098 | 25,388 |
| Batting average | 35.41 | 32.71 |
| 100s/50s | 2/5 | 48/113 |
| Top score | 129 | 259 |
| Balls bowled | 256 | 28,233 |
| Wickets | 0 | 394 |
| Bowling average | – | 30.98 |
| 5 wickets in innings | – | 12 |
| 10 wickets in match | – | 2 |
| Best bowling | – | 6/17 |
| Catches/stumpings | 14/– | 320/– |
- Source: CricInfo, 20 July 2021

Charles John Barnett (3 July 1910 – 28 May 1993) was an English cricketer, who played for Gloucestershire and for England in 20 Tests from 1933 to 1948. He was one of Wisden's five Cricketers of the Year in 1937.

== Life and career ==
Charlie Barnett came from a well-known Gloucestershire cricketing family – his father (Charles Barnett) and two uncles all played for the county, as amateurs. Educated at Wycliffe College in Stonehouse, Barnett began as an amateur (against Cambridge in 1927, when he was 16), turning professional in 1929.

One of the most stylish batsman of the 1930s, Barnett began his career in the middle order for Gloucestershire, but made his name as an opener after the retirement of Alfred Dipper in 1932. The greater responsibility added a tighter defence to his flashing array of drives and cuts, and he was picked for England against the West Indies in 1933. He marked his debut with a half century, batting at number 8, and passed 2,000 runs for the season. Although he remained vulnerable to an early dismissal, once set he was a formidable player and he recorded 48 centuries in all. Eleven sixes in an innings of 194 against Somerset in 1934, stands as a testament to the power of his stroke play. He failed to pass 1,500 runs in only two seasons, and gradually developed his left arm medium pace bowling, as a useful adjunct to his batting.

Barnett scored two Test centuries, putting on 219 for the first wicket with Len Hutton against Australia at Trent Bridge in 1938, as England compiled 658 for eight. His undefeated 98 before lunch on the first day of that Ashes series, remains the closest any Englishman has ever come to recording a century before lunch, on the first day of a Test match against Australia. However his career, like so many others, was stymied by World War II. He returned after the war in four more tests with little success, and retired from the county game to take up a league engagement for Rochdale, and later ran his own meat and poultry business.

He became a school coach until his retirement, and died in a Stroud Glos nursing home in May 1993, at the age of 82.
