= Jake Evans (footballer, born 2008) =

English footballer (born 2008)

Personal information
- Full name: Jake Benjamin Evans
- Date of birth: 21 August 2008 (age 18)
- Place of birth: Northampton, England
- Height: 5 ft 9 in (1.75 m)
- Positions: Right winger; forward

Team information
- Current team: Cheltenham Town (on loan from Leicester City)
- Number: 19

Youth career
- 2016–2025: Leicester City

Senior career*
Years	Team	Apps	(Gls)
2025–	Leicester City	4	(0)
2026	→ Northampton Town (loan)	16	(2)
2026–	→ Cheltenham Town (loan)	14	(4)

International career^{‡}
2024	England U16	2	(0)
2025	England U17	1	(0)
- * Club domestic league appearances and goals as of 00:25, 1 November 2026 (UTC) ‡ National team caps and goals as of 14:06, 7 November 2025 (UTC)

Jake Benjamin Evans (born 21 August 2008) is an English professional footballer who plays as a right winger or forward for EFL League Two club Cheltenham Town, on loan from EFL League One club Leicester City.

== Club career ==
A youth product of Leicester City, Evans started playing with their U23s at the age of 16. On 7 February 2025, he made the travelling squad for an FA Cup match against Manchester United, and he was the top scorer in the Premier League 2 shortly after with 11 goals. Around that time he started training regularly with the first team. Evans made his senior and professional debut with Leicester as a 98th-minute substitute for Kasey McAteer in a 2–2 Premier League tie with Brighton & Hove Albion on 12 April 2025.

On 27 January 2026, Evans signed for EFL League One club Northampton Town for the rest of the season. On 10 August, he signed for EFL League Two club Cheltenham Town on a season-long loan. He made his debut for Cheltenham on 15 August, coming on as a substitute in the 46th minute and scoring the winning goal in a 2–1 home victory over Rotherham United in the league.

== International career ==
In April 2024, Evans represented England under-16 in a friendly tournament against Italy and Belgium.

Evans was a late call-up to the England under-17 squad that competed at the 2025 FIFA U-17 World Cup and made his only appearance of the tournament during a group stage win over Haiti.

== Playing style ==
Evans plays as a winger or striker, and is adept at blocking of defender and holding the ball up. He has a strong burst of speed, and is a skilled finisher.

== Career statistics ==
As of match played 7 November 2026

Appearances and goals by club, season and competition
Club	Season	League			FA Cup		EFL Cup		Other		Total	
Club	Season	Division	Apps	Goals	Apps	Goals	Apps	Goals	Apps	Goals	Apps	Goals
Leicester City U21	2024–25	—			—		—		3 (Note: Appearances in EFL Trophy)	0	3	0
Leicester City	2024–25	Premier League	4	0	0	0	0	0	—		4	0
Leicester City	2025–26	Championship	0	0	0	0	0	0	—		0	0
Leicester City	2026–27	League One	0	0	0	0	0	0	0	0	0	0
Leicester City	Total		4	0	0	0	0	0	0	0	4	0
Northampton Town (loan)	2025–26	League One	16	2	—		—		2	0	18	2
Cheltenham Town (loan)	2026–27	League Two	14	4	1	1	—		1	0	16	5
Career total			34	6	1	1	0	0	6	0	41	7
