= Freddy Willcox =

English footballer (born 2005)

Personal information
- Full name: Frederick Henry Arthur Willcox
- Date of birth: 2 February 2006 (age 20)
- Place of birth: Worcester, England
- Position: Midfielder

Team information
- Current team: Cheltenham Town
- Number: 33

Youth career
- 2017–2024: Cheltenham Town

Senior career*
Years	Team	Apps	(Gls)
2023–	Cheltenham Town	23	(2)
2023–2024	→ Evesham United (loan)	28	(2)
2025	→ Oxford City (loan)	12	(0)
2026	→ Hereford (loan)	21	(1)
- * Club domestic league appearances and goals as of 20:17, 21 November 2026 (UTC)

Frederick Henry Arthur Willcox (born 2 February 2006) is an English professional footballer who plays as a midfielder for EFL League Two club Cheltenham Town.

== Career ==
=== Cheltenham Town ===
Willcox joined the Cheltenham Town academy aged 11. He made his first-team debut for the club on 7 May 2023, in a 2–2 draw with Charlton Athletic at Whaddon Road on the final day of the 2022–23 EFL League One season. He signed his first professional contract with the club in June 2024. In June 2026, he signed a new contract extension.

==== Non-League loan spells ====
On 25 January 2025, Willcox joined National League North club Oxford City on loan until the end of the season. On 17 February 2026, he joined National League North club Hereford on loan, along with Cheltenham teammate Harry Tustin. He made his debut the same day in a 1–0 league win at "home" against Darlington. He started all of Hereford's remaining 21 league matches played in just 68 days, helping the club escape relegation on the final day of the season.

== Career statistics ==
As of match played 21 November 2026

Appearances and goals by club, season and competition
Club	Season	League			FA Cup		EFL Cup		Other		Total	
Club	Season	Division	Apps	Goals	Apps	Goals	Apps	Goals	Apps	Goals	Apps	Goals
Cheltenham Town	2022–23	League One	1	0	0	0	0	0	0	0	1	0
Cheltenham Town	2023–24	League One	1	0	0	0	0	0	2 (Note: Appearance(s) in EFL Trophy)	0	3	0
Cheltenham Town	2024–25	League Two	2	0	0	0	1	0	2	0	5	0
Cheltenham Town	2025–26	League Two	6	0	1	0	2	0	3	0	12	0
Cheltenham Town	2026–27	League Two	13	2	1	0	0	0	3	0	17	2
Cheltenham Town	Total		23	2	2	0	3	0	10	0	38	2
Evesham United (loan)	2023–24	SL Division One South	28	2	0	0	—		2 (Note: One appearance in FA Trophy; one appearance in Worcestershire Senior Cup)	0	30	2
Oxford City (loan)	2024–25	National League North	12	0	—		—		1 (Note: One appearance, one goal in FA Trophy)	1	13	1
Hereford (loan)	2025–26	National League North	21	1	—		—		—		21	1
Career total			84	5	2	0	3	0	13	1	102	6
