= Russell Milton =

British footballer (born 1969)

Personal information
- Date of birth: 12 January 1969 (age 57)
- Place of birth: Folkestone, England
- Position: Midfielder

Youth career
- Arsenal

Senior career*
Years	Team	Apps	(Gls)
1986–1989	Arsenal	0	(0)
1989	Hitachi		
1990–1993	Double Flower FA / Instant-Dict		
1993–1997	Dover Athletic		
1997–2003	Cheltenham Town	118	(14)
2003–2005	Bath City		

International career
1994	England C	2	(0)

Managerial career
- 2015: Cheltenham Town (caretaker)
- 2017: Cheltenham Town (caretaker)
- 2018: Cheltenham Town (caretaker)
- * Club domestic league appearances and goals

Russell Milton (born 12 January 1969) is an English former professional footballer, born in Folkestone, who played as a midfielder in the Hong Kong First Division League for Instant-Dict and in The J League alongside Brazilian legends Socrates and Serginho. He scored 14 goals from 117 games in the Football League for Cheltenham Town and played over 200 times for them in total. He began his football career at Arsenal, where he stayed until the age of 21 being a first team squad member for 3 years. He also played non-league football for Dover Athletic and Bath City, for whom he made 51 appearances (40 in the league) and scored 8 goals.

Milton is a qualified PE teacher and previously took a degree in sports science, ran a football coaching school with Arsenal FC, commentated on Cheltenham Town matches for local BBC radio and lectured at the University of Gloucestershire. He has also worked for the Press Association, Opta and is currently the Premier League correspondent for Radio Sport National Australia.

On 13 February 2015, he was named as caretaker-manager of Cheltenham Town and is currently assistant manager with 3 stints as caretaker boss and a win ratio of over 35% in over 25 games.

Russell Milton returned to Cheltenham Town in 2025 as chief scout under Steve Cotterill

== Playing Honours ==
=== Cheltenham Town ===
- FA Trophy winners: 1997–98
- Football Conference runners-up: 1997–98
- Football Conference winners: 1998–99
- Third Division play-off winners: 2001–02

== Coaching Honours ==
=== Cheltenham Town ===
- Vanarama National League Winners: 2015-16
- League Two Champions: 2020-21
