= Lindsay Parsons =

English footballer and manager (1946–2019)

Personal information
- Full name: Lindsay William Parsons
- Date of birth: 20 March 1946
- Place of birth: Bristol, England
- Date of death: 12 April 2019 (aged 73)
- Position: Full back

Youth career
- South Gloucester Boys
- 1960–1961: New Cheltenham
- 1961–1964: Bristol Rovers

Senior career*
Years	Team	Apps	(Gls)
1964–1977	Bristol Rovers	360	(0)
1977–1980	Torquay United	56	(0)
1979–1982	Taunton Town		
1982–1983	Gloucester City		
1983–1984	Forest Green Rovers		
1984–1985	Yate Town		
1985–1989	Hanham Athletic		
1989–1990	Frome Town		
Total		416	(0)

Managerial career
- 1992–1993: Cheltenham Town
- * Club domestic league appearances and goals

Lindsay William Parsons (20 March 1946 – 12 April 2019) was an English professional footballer who played in The Football League for Bristol Rovers and Torquay United.

== Playing career ==
Parsons is from the Barton Hill area of Bristol and played football as a schoolboy for South Gloucester Boys Club and New Cheltenham before signing as an apprentice with Bristol Rovers in 1961 at the age of 15. He signed his first professional contract with Rovers on his eighteenth birthday and made his League debut shortly afterwards. He stayed with Bristol Rovers until 1977, fifteen years after he originally joined them, and made a total of 358 League appearances without scoring any goals. His only other Football League team was Torquay United, for whom he played between 1977 and 1980, and from there he went on to play for a number of non-League teams in the West Country – Taunton Town, Gloucester City, Forest Green Rovers, Yate Town, Hanham Athletic and Frome Town, finally retiring in 1990 at the age of 44.

== Non-playing career ==
Parsons took his first coaching job while still playing non-League football, coaching Bristol Rovers' schoolboy teams between 1983 and 1988. He later gained employment as a coach at Cheltenham Town in 1990, and after Ally Robertson vacated the manager's position in 1992 Parsons was appointed to the position in a caretaker's capacity, and was later given the job permanently.

He later forged a strong working relationship with his former Bristol Rovers teammate Tony Pulis, working with him in various coaching and scouting capacities at Gillingham, Bristol City, Portsmouth, Stoke City, Plymouth Argyle, and at Stoke City again from 2007. In April 2013 Parsons conducted an interview in which he criticised manager Tony Pulis' style of play and stated that a number of players he recommended to Pulis went on to join other Premier League club's. Pulis then stated he has no problems with Parsons views. However, on 3 May 2013 Parsons was fired by Stoke for a "breach of contract".

== Career statistics ==
Appearances and goals by club, season and competition
Club	Season	League			FA Cup		League Cup		Other		Total	
Club	Season	Division	Apps	Goals	Apps	Goals	Apps	Goals	Apps	Goals	Apps	Goals
Bristol Rovers	1963–64	Third Division	1	0	0	0	0	0	0	0	1	0
Bristol Rovers	1964–65	Third Division	3	0	0	0	0	0	0	0	3	0
Bristol Rovers	1965–66	Third Division	9	0	0	0	0	0	0	0	9	0
Bristol Rovers	1966–67	Third Division	17	0	3	0	0	0	0	0	20	0
Bristol Rovers	1967–68	Third Division	21	0	0	0	1	0	0	0	22	0
Bristol Rovers	1968–69	Third Division	34	0	6	0	1	0	0	0	41	0
Bristol Rovers	1969–70	Third Division	17	0	2	0	1	0	0	0	20	0
Bristol Rovers	1970–71	Third Division	43	0	3	0	6	0	0	0	52	0
Bristol Rovers	1971–72	Third Division	46	0	3	0	6	0	0	0	55	0
Bristol Rovers	1972–73	Third Division	46	0	1	0	6	0	3 (Note: Appearances in Watney Cup)	0	56	0
Bristol Rovers	1973–74	Third Division	42	0	3	0	1	0	2	0	48	0
Bristol Rovers	1974–75	Second Division	28	0	2	0	3	0	0	0	33	0
Bristol Rovers	1975–76	Second Division	27	0	2	0	2	0	0	0	31	0
Bristol Rovers	1976–77	Second Division	26	0	3	0	1	0	0	0	30	0
Bristol Rovers	Total		360	0	28	0	28	0	5	0	421	0
Torquay United	1977–78	Fourth Division	43	0	1	0	2	0	0	0	46	0
Torquay United	1978–79	Fourth Division	13	0	2	0	2	0	0	0	30	0
Torquay United	Total		56	0	3	0	4	0	0	0	76	0
Career total			416	0	31	0	32	0	5	0	484	0
