= Percival Barnett =

English cricketer

Personal information
- Born: 8 October 1889; Cheltenham, Gloucestershire
- Died: 17 January 1966 (aged 76); Kendal, Westmorland
- Batting: Right-handed

Domestic team information
- Years: Team
- 1908-1909: Gloucestershire
- Source: Cricinfo, 30 March 2014

Percival Barnett (8 October 1889 – 17 January 1966) was an English cricketer. He played for Gloucestershire between 1908 and 1909.
