= Graham Allner =

English football manager (born 1949)

Personal information
- Date of birth: 7 September 1949 (age 77)
- Place of birth: Birmingham, England

Youth career
- Birmingham City
- Walsall

Senior career*
Years	Team	Apps	(Gls)
- Paget Rangers

Managerial career
- AP Leamington
- 1983–1998: Kidderminster Harriers
- 1998–1999: Worcester City
- 2002: Cheltenham Town
- * Club domestic league appearances and goals

Graham Allner (born 7 September 1949) is an English former football player and manager.

He was manager of Kidderminster Harriers from 1983 until 1998, winning the FA Trophy in 1987 and the Conference Premier championship in 1994.

== Early life ==
Allner was born in Birmingham, England.

== Playing career ==
Allner started his playing career as a schoolboy at Birmingham City before signing amateur forms at Walsall playing reserve football. After being released he drifted into non-league football, firstly at Paget Rangers, where he won the Midland Combination under the guidance of manager Rhys Davies. Allner had a trial with Aston Villa during the 1970–71 season. He then rejoined Davies at Alvechurch, winning another Midland Combination title in 1971–72. During that season Allner played in all 6 FA Cup games against Oxford City. Two years later he scored the winning goal against Exeter City in the FA Cup before eventually being knocked out by Bradford City. A trial at Hereford United followed in 1974 before signing for Stourbridge in September 1974 under Allan Grundy. He only spent a season at Stourbridge before moving to Redditch United, then quickly moving on to Bromsgrove Rovers.

He joined Stafford Rangers in 1976, spending two seasons with them. He joined Worcester City in 1978; in his first season they won the Southern Football League but injury sidelined him for most of the first Alliance Premier League season.

Allner then made his first entry into coaching, being appointed player assistant manager at Cheltenham Town.

== Managerial career ==
Allner began his managerial career with AP Leamington. He led AP Leamington to the Southern League Premier Division in 1983. However, Leamington were denied promotion to the Football Conference, their place being taken instead by the club that had finished second that year, Kidderminster Harriers. Soon after this, Allner left Leamington and took charge at the Worcestershire club. Kidderminster quickly established themselves as a top non-league side under Allner's management, winning the FA Trophy in 1987 and reaching the final in 1991 and 1995, in addition to making the final of the Welsh Cup in 1986 and 1989. Their most successful season came in 1994–95 when they reached the fifth round of the FA Cup, knocking out second-tier side Birmingham City (Allner's first club as a player), and Preston North End. They also won the Conference title that season, but were denied promotion because their Aggborough ground was not deemed up to Football League standards.

Kidderminster almost made it to the Football League in 1996–97 after leading the Conference by 15 points at Christmas, but a storming run by close contenders Macclesfield Town pushed them into second place.

Allner quit in November 1998 after almost 16 years in charge, and was eventually replaced by Jan Molby. A brief tenure as Worcester City manager followed.

He later worked as a coach under Steve Cotterill at Cheltenham Town and helped them win promotion to Division Two in 2002. When Cotterill moved to Stoke City a few weeks after the promotion triumph, Allner was promoted to the manager's seat but was sacked on 13 January 2003 with Cheltenham heading for relegation. His successor was Bobby Gould.
