= Charles Barnett (cricketer, born 1884) =

English cricketer and footballer

Charles Sherborne Barnett (24 February 1884 in Cheltenham, Gloucestershire – 20 November 1962 in Gloucester, Gloucestershire) was an English cricketer who played for Gloucestershire.

He also played football for his local team Cheltenham Town in the early 1900s with his brother Edgar
