= Cheltenham Town F.C. =

Association football club in Cheltenham, England

- Full name: Cheltenham Town Football Club
- Nickname: The Robins
- Founded: 1887; 139 years ago
- Ground: Whaddon Road
- Capacity: 7,066
- Owner: Mike Garlick
- Chairman: David Bloxham
- Manager: Steve Cotterill
- League: EFL League Two
- 2025–26: EFL League Two, 18th of 24
- Website: ctfc.com
Home colours	Away colours	Third colours

Cheltenham Town Football Club is a professional association football club based in the town of Cheltenham, Gloucestershire, England. The team competes in EFL League Two, the fourth level of the English football league system.

Founded in 1887, the club spent much of its early history competing in local football circles, before moving to the Birmingham Combination in 1932 and then the Southern League in 1935. They spent the next 50 years in the Southern League, winning the Midland Division in 1982–83 and then claiming the Premier Division title in 1984–85. They were subsequently promoted into the Alliance Premier League in 1985, where they remained for seven seasons until they were relegated in 1992. They finished as runners-up of the Southern League Premier Division for four of the next five seasons, and were promoted into the Conference in 1997.

Under the stewardship of Steve Cotterill, Cheltenham won the 1998 FA Trophy final and then secured promotion into the Football League for the first time after winning the Conference title in 1998–99. He left the club after the 2001–02 season, having guided them to the FA Cup fifth round and promotion with victory in the 2002 Third Division play-off final. Immediately relegated after one season in the Second Division, they secured another promotion as manager John Ward guided them to victory in the 2006 League Two play-off final. Relegated after three seasons in the third tier, the club's 16-year stay in the Football League ended with relegation back to the National League in 2015. However manager Gary Johnson led Cheltenham to the Conference title with a 101-point tally in 2015–16, making them the first club in 26 years to secure an immediate return to the Football League as champions of the Conference. After Michael Duff took over from Johnson, he led the club to its first Football League title, winning the 2020–21 League Two title. They were relegated to League Two after three seasons in the third tier.

Nicknamed the "Robins", they have played at Whaddon Road since 1932. The club contests rivalries with Gloucester City, Hereford United and recently Forest Green Rovers.

== History ==
=== Early Years: 1887–1940 ===
Cheltenham has a history of football prior to The Robins. In 1849, the first use of three official referees in a match, two in field and one in tribune, was recorded in the town. However, the modern club was founded in 1887 by Albert Close White, a local teacher.

The club spent its first three decades in local football. Notable players from those days included former England international Philip Bach, cricketers Gilbert Jessop and brothers Charles Barnett and Edgar Barnett..

In December 1931 the club moved to Whaddon Road and turned semi-professional in 1932–33, joining the Birmingham Combination whilst adopting new colours of red and white hooped shirts, black shorts, and red and white stockings. Former England international George Blackburn was appointed player coach, and led the team to third place in their debut season. The following year the club entered the FA Cup, featuring a ten-game journey to the third round before losing to Blackpool in front of a record attendance at the Athletic Ground in Cheltenham. Following a disappointing season in 1934–35, brightened only by winning the Leamington Hospital Cup and the discovery and sale of centre froward James Currier to Bolton Wanderers, the club applied for membership and were accepted to join the Southern League for the 1935–36 season.

Town kicked-off their debut Southern League campaign with two firsts. The club appointed its first manager with "complete power" of team selection in George Carr, and fielded an all professional eleven in the first game of the season against Barry. Despite a flying start in the season opener, Town could only finish sixth in the Western and ninth in the Central sections of the league. However, the season did feature an FA Cup run to the first round where Brighton and Hove Albion were taken to a replay. A notable result during the run was the club's record victory, beating Chippenham Rovers 12–0 in the Third Round Qualifying.

The 1936–37 season was Carr's last, resigning in April 1937. Town finished eleventh as the Southern League switched to a single division, with the side featuring appearances from future England international Tim Ward before his move to Derby County. Off the field, the club moved to establish itself as a limited company.

Carr's replacement was former Arsenal forward James Brain. After losing two stalwart performers for the club - Cliff Lang to illness and Ernie Williams to injury - Brain couldn't improve on eleventh place in the league. But he took the team to the FA Cup first round, losing 3–0 to Watford, while Newport County knocked Town out the Welsh Cup at the quarter-final stage. Two of the side's consistent performers, winger Cliff Thorley and goalkeeper Jack Wheeler earned moves to Bristol City and Birmingham respectively. Crisis was averted when players, shareholders and supporters contributed to keep the club in business following a financial crunch.

Cheltenham rebranded as "The Robins" for the 1938–39 campaign, wearing white shirts with a robin emblem and red sleeves. Another FA Cup run ended against league opposition in the first round as Cardiff City won a replay following a 1–1 draw at Whaddon Road. In the league, Town had another bottom half finish. All 16 league wins came at home, and only on six occasions did Cheltenham avoid a league defeat away from Whaddon Road. Once again, the threat of closure hung over the club.

A promising start to the 1939–40 season was curtailed by the outbreak of World War II. Following a pause, the Southern League established a limited regional programme, often featuring guest players, and Cheltenham finished next to bottom of the league's Western division. At the season's end the club announced it would "not arrange any more fixtures until further notice".

=== 1985–1999 ===
They won promotion to the Alliance Premier League (now the Conference National) in 1985, but were relegated seven years later.

Cheltenham Town's traditional colours

The appointment of Steve Cotterill as manager during the 1996–97 was the start of a period of success at the club which resulted in Cotterill being their most successful manager. Four months after taking charge he guided the club to runners-up spot in the Southern Football League Premier Division, but they won promotion to the Football Conference as champions Gresley Rovers were unable to meet the required ground capacity for Conference membership. In 1997–98, Cheltenham finished runners-up in the Conference and were close to champions Halifax Town until the end of April 1998. They secured a place at Wembley in the 1998 FA Trophy Final, beating Southport 1–0 in front of a crowd of 26,837 at Wembley Stadium. In 1998–99, Cheltenham secured the Conference title and entry to the Football League.

=== Football League (1999–2015) ===
Chart of Cheltenham's yearly table positions since 1997.

After two mid-table finishes in Division Three, Cheltenham finally won promotion to Division Two (via the Division Three playoffs) at the end of the 2001–02 season. Shortly after winning promotion, Cotterill left Cheltenham to join Stoke City as their manager.

Cheltenham replaced Cotterill with first-team coach Graham Allner who had won the Conference championship with Kidderminster Harriers in 1994. Allner and assistant manager Mike Davis, who was originally assistant to Cotterill, were sacked in January 2003, after six months in the job, with Cheltenham near the foot of Division Two. Cheltenham turned to Bobby Gould, one of the most experienced managers in English football whose exploits include an FA Cup victory with Wimbledon in 1988. Cheltenham continued to struggle, and defeat in their final game of the season condemned the club to relegation back to Division Three after just one season. Gould resigned as Cheltenham Town manager in November 2003 and was replaced by John Ward.

During the 2005–06 season, a new stand for visiting fans was added (The Carlsberg Stand). They finished the season in 5th, earning a place in the play-offs. In the semi-final Cheltenham beat Wycombe Wanderers 2–1 away and drew 0–0 in the second leg at Whaddon Road. In the play-off final, Cheltenham beat Grimsby Town 1–0, securing a place in League One for 2006–07. The match at the Millennium Stadium on 28 May 2006 was attended by 29,196 people.

Cheltenham started life in League One with a 1–0 win against Gillingham. Following Cheltenham's 3–0 defeat to Port Vale, manager John Ward announced he had agreed a four-year contract with League One side Carlisle United. A highlight of the season was winning twice against Leeds United. Cheltenham's survival was secured on the final day of the season as they beat Doncaster Rovers 2–1 at Whaddon Road, denying their opposition automatic promotion.

Early in the 2008–09 season, Keith Downing left Cheltenham Town and was replaced by Martin Allen. Allen's team started poorly with a club-record seven consecutive defeats, part of a 15-game run without a victory. The club narrowly avoided administration, and the 10-point penalty that would go with it, before Allen revealed that all the players at the club were up for sale. The season finished with Cheltenham's relegation back to League Two on the penultimate day of the season after three seasons in League One as they had conceded over 100 goals in all competitions.

Cheltenham won their first match of the 2009–10 season against Grimsby Town 2–1, but fell dramatically down the table soon after. On 20 October, Martin Allen was "put on gardening leave" amid allegations he racially abused a nightclub bouncer, and assistant manager John Schofield took temporary charge. Allen was formally cleared of misconduct but still left the club by mutual consent in early December. Former Cheltenham captain and Kidderminster boss Mark Yates was appointed manager on 22 December 2009. Cheltenham continued to struggle through the rest of the season, only managing to avoid relegation on the final day of the season, although they finished four points ahead of the relegated sides.

Yates, ahead of his first full season with Cheltenham, revamped the squad, releasing eight players, including defender Shane Duff, who had just completed his tenth year with the club. The season proved to be successful to begin with, with the Robins remaining close to the play-off positions, but they collapsed in the second half of the season and finished 17th, with only five wins in 26 games in 2011.

Despite losing in the first round of the League Cup, they reached the Football League Trophy south quarter-finals and were handed a lucrative tie at Tottenham Hotspur in the FA Cup third round. The Robins ended the season in 6th and defeated Torquay United 2–0 at home and then 1–2 away in the play-off semi-finals. The play-off final was contested at Wembley Stadium on 27 May 2012. Crewe Alexandra defeated Cheltenham Town 2–0 with goals from Nick Powell and Byron Moore in front of a crowd of 24,029.

The Robins also enjoyed a good run in the FA Cup, eventually losing out 5–1 to Premier League side Everton. On 6 November 2012, manager Mark Yates oversaw his 150th game in charge of the team in a 1–0 win against league leaders Gillingham. Cheltenham finished 5th, once again qualifying for the end of season play-offs after being pipped to the third promotion spot on the last day of the season by Rotherham United. The season included a run of 21 home league games without defeat. The play-offs saw Cheltenham face Northampton Town with Cheltenham losing both home and away games by 1–0.

After finishing in the play-offs for two consecutive seasons, Cheltenham Town's 2013–14 season proved to be difficult. Any hopes of a third consecutive play-off place were ended by March. The highlight of the season was a trip to Premier League side West Ham United, with the club eventually losing 2–1 at Upton Park. Cheltenham finished the season in 17th place.

On 25 November 2014, Mark Yates was sacked by Cheltenham Town after almost five years in charge. Cheltenham subsequently appointed Paul Buckle as team manager, but he was dismissed after just 79 days. In March 2015 Gary Johnson was appointed manager. In April 2015, after Bryan Jacob, a lifelong supporter, gave the club's supporters trust £222,000 in his will, members voted to use the money to accept a long-standing offer from the club for a permanent seat on its board of directors. Football fan Clive Gowing was subsequently elected. The club said it would also name a stand and supporters' player-of-the-season award in Jacob's memory. On 25 April 2015, Cheltenham Town lost at Whaddon Road to Shrewsbury Town, which meant that Cheltenham were relegated from the Football League after sixteen seasons.

=== Return to the Football League (2016–) ===
After only one season outside of the Football League, Cheltenham secured an immediate return on 16 April 2016 with a 2–0 home win against FC Halifax Town. The team amassed 101 points, scoring the most and conceding the fewest goals, on their way to becoming champions, finishing 12 points clear of second-placed local rivals Forest Green Rovers. January signing Dan Holman was joint winner of the National League's Golden Boot award, with 30 goals, having netted 16 times in just 18 games for the Robins. Danny Wright, a summer signing, finished the season with 22 league goals and 11 assists, winning the Supporters Player of the Year award.

For the club's return to the Football League, manager Gary Johnson largely kept faith with the players that had won the previous year's National League. The 2016–17 season proved to be a struggle with a number of players finding the step up to League Two more difficult than had been hoped. The Whaddon Road pitch also came in for criticism, from both supporters and visiting managers, as it struggled to cope with its high levels of use (Gloucester City were in the final season of a ground-share at Cheltenham during 2016–17). Results improved somewhat during the spring, although Johnson was absent on sick leave from March onwards while recovering from heart bypass surgery, leaving his assistant Russell Milton in charge. The Robins secured their league status with a 1–0 win over Hartlepool United in the penultimate game of the season. They finished the season in 21st place.

During the close season a recovered Gary Johnson returned to work and signed a new two-year contract. He oversaw a major clearout of the squad with eleven players released. In the 2017–18 season the club ultimately only gained one point more than in the previous year (51 compared to 50), and finished in 17th place in League Two. By far the biggest success of an otherwise low-key year was Sudanese striker Mohamed Eisa. Signed as a free transfer from non-league football, Eisa scored 23 league goals for Cheltenham during the season and ultimately moved to Bristol City, for a transfer fee reportedly in excess of £1m (a club record sale), in July 2018. At the end of the season, long-serving club chairman Paul Baker stood down from the role after 20 years, handing over the chairmanship to Andy Wilcox.

On 10 September 2018, ex-Cheltenham player Michael Duff was appointed after the departure of Gary Johnson. Duff guided the Robins to 16th. The following 2019–20 season was very successful, narrowly missing out on automatic promotion in 4th place. Final league standings were decided on a points-per-game basis following disruption caused by the COVID-19 pandemic. Cheltenham missed out in the play-offs to Northampton Town, losing 3–2 on aggregate.

In 2020–21, Cheltenham returned to League One as champions after five seasons in League Two. Due to the ongoing disruption caused by COVID-19, the vast majority of fixtures in 2020–21 took place behind closed doors. The Robins reached the fourth round of the FA Cup for the first time since 2006 before narrowly losing out to eventual 2020–21 Premier League champions Manchester City. Cheltenham were leading the match with ten minutes to play before eventually losing 3–1. Cheltenham guaranteed their return to League One with a 1–1 draw at home to Carlisle United. On 8 May 2021, Cheltenham won their first ever Football League title, beating Harrogate Town 4–1 on the final day to secure the League Two championship.

In the 2021–22 and 2022–23 seasons, Cheltenham finished 15th and 16th respectively in League One. As one of the smallest clubs operating at that level, they were greatly helped by the form of striker Alfie May who scored a total of 43 league goals over the two seasons. At the end of the 2021–22 season, head coach Michael Duff left for Barnsley and was replaced by Wade Elliott who was promoted internally from the role of first-team coach.

At the start of the 2023–24 season, Cheltenham failed to score a goal in their opening eleven matches which equalled a Football League record. This start to the season cost Elliott his job. He was replaced by Darrell Clarke, but despite form improving significantly, Cheltenham were still relegated to League Two on the final day of the season. Clarke left for Barnsley at the end of the season. On 31 May 2024, Michael Flynn was appointed as Cheltenham Town manager.

== Kit sponsors and manufacturers ==
Table of kit suppliers and shirt sponsors appear below:

Year	Kit manufacturer	Shirt sponsor	Back of shirt sponsor	Short sponsor
1977–1978		National Express		
1981–1982	Coffer Sports			
1982–1985	Umbro			
1984–1986	Umbro	Whitbread		
1986–1988	Henson	Duraflex		
1988–1989		Gulf Oil LP		
1991–1992	Hero	Gulf Oil LP		
1992–1993	Technik	Gulf Oil LP		
1993–1994	Club Sport	Gulf Oil LP		
1994–1995	Klūb Sport	Empress		
1995–1996	Matchwinner	Empress		
1996–1997	UK	Endsleigh Insurance		
1997–1999	Errea	Endsleigh Insurance		
1999–2004	Errea	Towergate Insurance		
2004–2008	Errea	Bence Building Merchants		
2008–2009	Errea	Mira Showers		
2009–2011	Errea	Mira Showers	PSU Technology Group	
2011–2013	Errea	Mira Showers	Barr Stadia	Gloucestershire Echo
2013–2014	Errea	Mira Showers	Gloucestershire College	Gloucestershire Echo
2014–2015	Errea	Mira Showers	Marchants Coaches	Gloucestershire Echo
2015–2016	Errea	Mira Showers	Marchants Coaches	LCI Rail
2016–2020	Errea	Mira Showers	Marchants Coaches	RK Lewis Transport
2020-2021	Errea	Mira Showers	Marchants Coaches	RK Lewis Transport
2021-2022	Errea	Mira Showers	Marchants Coaches	
2022-2023	Errea	Mira Showers	Marchants Coaches	HGV Drivers UK
2023-2024	Errea	Mira Showers		
2024-2025	Errea	Mira Showers		CGT Lettings & Sales
2025-2026	Errea	Mira Showers	Marchants Coaches	Jaydee Living
2026-2027	Adidas	Mira Showers	Marchants Coaches	Jaydee Living

== Rivalries ==
Gloucestershire outfit Forest Green Rovers are currently seen as the club's main rivals. Fixtures between the two sides are humorously named El Glosico, a play-on-words of the famous El Clásico fixture. In recent years, the rivalry has grown heated due to the close proximity between the clubs, the fight for the 2015–16 National League title (Cheltenham and Forest Green finishing 1st and 2nd respectively) and, between 2017 and 2021, both competing in League Two.

Traditionally, Cheltenham's main rivals were Gloucestershire neighbours Gloucester City. Due to Cheltenham's rise up the leagues, the last competitive meeting between the two sides was in 1997, meaning the rivalry is now of less significance but is still keenly discussed by both sets of fans. They also used to maintain fierce rivalries with Kidderminster Harriers and Hereford United. The Hereford rivalry is nowadays less significant, however, due to United going out of business in 2014 and reforming as Hereford FC. The new club and Cheltenham are yet to meet in a competitive fixture.

A survey conducted in August 2019 revealed that fans of The Robins also consider fellow West Country sides Bristol City, Bristol Rovers and Swindon Town, as well as South East England side Oxford United, as rivals.

== Players ==
As of 21 August 2026

=== Current squad ===
Note: Flags indicate national team as defined under FIFA eligibility rules; some limited exceptions apply. Players may hold more than one non-FIFA nationality.

No.	Pos.	Nation	Player
1	GK	ENG	Joe Day
3	DF	USA	Jonathan Tomkinson
4	DF	ENG	Joe Tomlinson
5	DF	ENG	Robbie Cundy
6	DF	WAL	James Wilson (captain)
7	MF	ENG	Ben Stevenson
8	MF	NIR	Charlie McCann
9	FW	ENG	Kirsten Otchere (on loan from Leicester City)
10	FW	ENG	George Miller
11	FW	ENG	Jake Bickerstaff
14	MF	WAL	Ryan Broom
17	MF	ENG	Shaun McWilliams
18	FW	AUT	Andreas Weimann
19	FW	ENG	Jake Evans (on loan from Leicester City)

No.	Pos.	Nation	Player
20	FW	ENG	Favour Onukwuli
21	DF	ENG	George Nurse
23	GK	ENG	Wyll Stanway
25	DF	IRL	Pierce Sweeney
26	MF	IRL	Jordan Shipley
33	MF	ENG	Freddy Willcox
35	DF	ENG	Mark Barber
36	FW	ENG	George Mcnamme
37	MF	ENG	Archie Hill
38	DF	ENG	Jack Robinson
39	FW	ENG	Noah Carter
40	FW	ENG	Ryan Todd
41	MF	ENG	Ethan Hardy

=== Out on loan ===
Note: Flags indicate national team as defined under FIFA eligibility rules; some limited exceptions apply. Players may hold more than one non-FIFA nationality.

No.	Pos.	Nation	Player
31	GK	ENG	Mamadou Diallo (on loan at Worcester City)
32	FW	ENG	Sopuruchukwu Obieri (on loan at Evesham United)

No.	Pos.	Nation	Player
34	MF	ENG	Harry Tustin (on loan at Hereford)

== Player of the Year winners ==
As of 15 May 2026

1966	(England) Gerald Horlick
1967	(England) Ronnie Radford
1968	(England) Joe Gadston
1969	(England) Frank Conboy
1970	(England) Alan White
1971	(England) Allan Jefferies
1972	(England) Pat Casey
1973	(England) Richard Wilkes
1974	(England) Pat Casey
1975	(England) Dave Lewis
1976	(England) Jeff Miles
1977	(England) Ray Dean
1978	(England) Terry Paine
1979	(Scotland) Dave Dangerfield
1980	(England) Wayne Hams
1981	(England) Alan Ollis
1982	(England) John Dyer
1983	(England) Paul Tester
1984	(England) Norman Pemberton
1985	(England) Brian Hughes
1986	(England) Neil Hards
1987	(England) Kevin Willetts
1988	(England) Ray Baverstock
1989	(England) Mark Buckland
1990	(England) Mark Buckland
1991	(England) Kevin Willetts

1992	(England) Kevin Willetts
1993	(England) Steve Brown
1994	(Wales) Martin Thomas
1995	(England) Chris Banks
1996	(England) Jason Eaton
1997	(England) Jamie Victory
1998	(England) Chris Banks
1999	(England) Neil Grayson
2000	(England) Russell Milton
2001	(England) Mark Yates
2002	(England) Julian Alsop
2003	(England) Martin Devaney
2004	(England) Shane Higgs

2005	(Northern Ireland) Shane Duff
2006	(England) Brian Wilson
2007	(England) Shane Higgs
2008	(England) Dave Bird
2009	(England) Dave Bird
2010	(England) Julian Alsop
2011	(England) Keith Lowe
2012	(Portugal) Sido Jombati
2013	(England) Scott Brown
2014	(England) Byron Harrison
2015	(Northern Ireland) Trevor Carson
2016	(England) Danny Wright
2017	(England) Billy Waters

2018	(Sudan) Mohamed Eisa
2019	(England) Luke Varney
2020	(England) Ben Tozer
2021	(England) Ben Tozer
2022	(England) Alfie May
2023	(England) Alfie May
2024	(England) Liam Sercombe
2025	(England) Sam Stubbs
2026	(England) Isaac Hutchinson

== First team staff ==
Whaddney, mascot of Cheltenham Town

As of 17 August 2026

First Team Manager	Steve Cotterill
Assistant Manager	Rob Edwards
First Team Coach	Ashley Vincent
Goalkeeping Coach	Joe Day (player-coach)
Chief Scout	Russell Milton
Recruitment Advisor	Keith Burt
Head of Medical	James Redman
First Team Physiotherapist	Georgia Pearson
Club Doctor	Dr. Sophie Risebero
Head of Physical Performance	Jeremy Beasley
Lead First Team Analyst	Dom Wheway
Assistant First Team Analyst	Sam Mills
Kit Manager	Gerry Oldham
Kit Assistant	Hannah Oldham

== Club ownership ==
The club is owned by a core ownership group of two main shareholders and numerous smaller shareholders.

The following own 10% or more of the club, and are required to be identified on the club's website in accordance with English Football League regulations: Majority owner, Mike Garlick (who owns at least 75%) and the Cheltenham Town supporters' trust, the Robins Trust (14.7%).

On 23 August 2025, the club announced that Mike Garlick had completed his acquisition of a controlling interest in the club combined with a commitment for future investment. Garlick was previously chairman of Burnley from 2015 to 2023, and currently owns Gibraltarian club St Joseph's and Spanish side Antequera.

== Board of directors ==
Owner & Majority Shareholder	Mike Garlick
Chairman	David Bloxham
Directors	Alison Garlick, Paul Godfrey, Clive Gowing
Fan Elected Director	Dave Beesley
Honorary President	John Murphy
Associate Director	Mark Cuzner

== Managerial history ==
Key

- Names of caretaker managers are supplied where known, and the names of caretaker managers are highlighted in italics and marked with an asterisk (*).
- 1932–1934 George Blackburn (coach)
- 1934–1935 George Watson (coach)
- 1935–1937 George Carr
- 1937–1948 Jimmy Brain
- 1948–1950 Cyril Dean
- 1950–1952 George Summerbee
- 1952–1953 William Raeside
- 1953–1958 Arch Anderson
- 1958–1960 Ron Lewin
- 1960–1961 Peter Donnelly
- 1961 Tommy Cavanagh
- 1961 Roy Shiner*
- 1961–1965 Arch Anderson
- 1965–1966 Harold Fletcher
- 1966–1973 Bobby Etheridge
- 1973–1974 Willie Penman
- 1974–1979 Dennis Allen
- 1979 Terry Paine
- 1979–1982 Alan Grundy
- 1982 Roger Thorndale*
- 1982–1983 Alan Wood
- 1983–1988 John Murphy
- 1988 Dave Lewis*
- 1988–1990 Jim Barron
- 1990 John Murphy
- 1990–1991 Dave Lewis*
- 1991–1992 Ally Robertson
- 1992–1995 Lindsay Parsons
- 1995 Peter Higgins*
- 1995–1997 Chris Robinson
- 1997–2002 Steve Cotterill
- 2002 Graham Allner
- 2002 Chris Banks, Mark Yates, Bob Bloomer*
- 2002–2003 Bobby Gould
- 2003 Bob Bloomer*
- 2003–2007 John Ward
- 2007–2008 Keith Downing
- 2008–2009 Martin Allen
- 2009 John Schofield*
- 2009–2014 Mark Yates
- 2014–2015 Paul Buckle
- 2015 Russell Milton*
- 2015–2018 Gary Johnson
- 2018 Russell Milton*
- 2018–2022 Michael Duff
- 2022–2023 Wade Elliott
- 2023 Kevin Russell*
- 2023–2024 Darrell Clarke
- 2024–2025 Michael Flynn
- 2025 Aaron Downes, Ashley Vincent*
- 2025– Steve Cotterill

== Club records ==
As of 7 June 2025.

Record attendance	10,389 vs. Blackpool, FA Cup third round, 13 January 1934 at Athletic Ground, Cheltenham
Record attendance at Whaddon Road	8,326 vs Reading, FA Cup first round, 17 November 1956
Record transfer fee paid	Aidan Keena from Sligo Rovers (January 2023)
Record transfer fee received	£1.5m Mo Eisa to Bristol City (July 2018)
Record win	12–0 vs Chippenham Rovers, FA Cup third qualifying round, 2 November 1935
Record defeat	1–10 vs Merthyr Tydfil, Southern League, 8 March 1952
Record appearances	Roger Thorndale – 703 (1958–1976)
Record goalscorer	Dave Lewis – 290
Record goals in a season	Dave Lewis, 53 in all competitions (1974–1975)
Fastest goal	Graham Green vs Hillingdon Borough, 11 Seconds, Southern League, 11 February 1967
Oldest player	Derek Bragg (aged 42 years 2 months 23 days) vs. Farnborough Town, 7 April 1999
Oldest Goalscorer	Clive Walker, 41 years, 11 months, 8 days vs Gloucester City, May 4th 1999
Youngest player (all competitions)	Sopuruchukwu Obieri (aged 15 years and 303 days) vs. West Ham United U21s, 7 November 2023
Youngest player (Football League)	Tom King, 16 years, 319 days vs Shrewsbury Town, August 5th 2023
Youngest player (non-league)	Simon Goodwin, 16 years, 245 days vs Burton Albion, March 9th 1996.

== Honours ==
League

- Third Division / League Two (level 4)
  - Champions: 2020–21
  - Play-off winners: 2002, 2006
- Football Conference / National League (level 5)
  - Champions: 1998–99, 2015–16
  - Runners-up: 1997–98
- Southern League (level 6)
  - Champions: 1984–85
  - Runners-up: 1955–56, 1992–93, 1993–94, 1994–95, 1996–97
- Southern League Midland Division
  - Champions: 1982–83
- Cheltenham League
  - Champions: 1910–11, 1913–14
- Southern League Division One North
  - Runners-up : 1976–77

Cup

- FA Trophy
  - Winners: 1997–98
- Southern League Cup
  - Winners: 1957–58
  - Runners-up; 1968–69, 1984–85
- Leamington Hospital Cup
  - Winners: 1934–35
- Midland Floodlit Cup
  - Winners: 1985–86, 1986–87, 1987–88
- Gloucestershire Senior Cup
  - Winners: 1998–99
- Gloucestershire Senior Amateur North Challenge Cup
  - Winners: 1929–30, 1930–31, 1932–33, 1933–34, 1934–35
