= 2020–21 Queens Park Rangers F.C. season =

English football club season

Queens Park Rangers
2020–21 season
- Chairman: Amit Bhatia
- Manager: Mark Warburton
- Stadium: Loftus Road
- EFL Championship: 9th
- FA Cup: Third round
- EFL Cup: First round
- Top goalscorer: League: Lyndon Dykes (12); All: Lyndon Dykes (12)
- Highest home attendance: 2,000 Vs Reading (12 Dec 2020), Stoke City (15 Dec 2020)
- Lowest home attendance: 0*(behind closed doors due to covid restrictions)
- Average home league attendance: 86.9
- Biggest win: 4-1 Vs Sheffield Wednesday (10 April 2021)
- Biggest defeat: 0-3 Vs Barnsley (27 October 2020)
Home colours	Away colours	Third colours

The 2020–21 Queens Park Rangers F.C. season was the 139th edition of Queens Park Rangers F.C. existence and the club's 6th consecutive season in the second division of English football. In addition to the domestic league, they contested the FA Cup, and the EFL Cup.

== Players ==
=== First team squad ===
As of 8 May 2021

No.	Name	Nat	Position	Since	Date of birth (age)	Signed from	Contract expires	Games	Goals
Goalkeepers
1	Joe Lumley	(England)	GK	2013	15 February 1995 (age 31)	(England) Tottenham Hotspur	2021	84	0
13	Seny Dieng	(Senegal)	GK	2016	23 November 1994 (age 31)	(Germany) MSV Duisburg	2024	43	0
Defenders
2	Todd Kane	(England)	RB	2019	17 September 1993 (age 32)	(England) Chelsea	2022	65	3
3	Lee Wallace	(Scotland)	LB	2019	1 August 1987 (age 38)	(Scotland) Rangers	2021	39	2
4	Rob Dickie	(England)	CB	2020	3 March 1996 (age 30)	(England) Oxford United	2024	45	3
5	Jordy de Wijs	(Netherlands)	CB	2021	8 January 1995 (age 31)	(England) Hull City	Loan	9	1
6	Yoann Barbet	(France)	CB	2019	10 May 1993 (age 33)	(England) Brentford	2022	76	2
14	Ryan Manning	(Republic of Ireland)	LB/CM/LM	2015	14 June 1996 (age 29)	(Republic of Ireland) Galway United	2021	96	9
23	Conor Masterson	(Republic of Ireland)	CB	2019	8 September 1998 (age 27)	(England) Liverpool	2023	20	1
24	Osman Kakay	(Sierra Leone)	RB	2015	25 August 1997 (age 28)	(England) Queens Park Rangers Academy	2024	48	2
25	Niko Hämäläinen	(Finland)	LB/CB	2014	5 March 1997 (age 29)	(United States) FC Dallas	2021	28	0
41	Stephen Duke-McKenna	(Guyana)	MF	2019	17 August 2000 (age 25)	(England) Bolton Wanderers	2021	1	0
Midfielders
8	Luke Amos	(England)	CM/DM	2019	23 February 1997 (age 29)	(England) Tottenham Hotspur	2023	41	2
10	Ilias Chair	(Morocco)	AM/RM/LM	2017	30 October 1997 (age 28)	(Belgium) Lierse	2023	107	14
11	Bright Osayi-Samuel	(Nigeria)	RW/LW	2017	31 December 1997 (age 28)	(England) Blackpool	2021	115	13
12	Dominic Ball	(England)	DM/CB/CM	2019	2 August 1995 (age 30)	(England) Rotherham United	2022	76	2
14	Stefan Johansen	(Norway)	CM	2021	8 January 1991 (age 35)	(England) Fulham	Loan	21	4
15	Sam Field	(England)	CM	2021	8 May 1998 (age 28)	(England) West Bromwich Albion	Loan	19	1
19	George Thomas	(Wales)	AM	2020	24 March 1997 (age 29)	(England) Leicester City	2023	17	0
20	Geoff Cameron (captain)	(United States)	DM/CB	2019	11 July 1985 (age 40)	(England) Stoke City	2021	91	2
21	Chris Willock	(England)	AM/RM/LM	2020	31 January 1998 (age 28)	(Portugal) Benfica	2023	38	3
22	Tom Carroll	(England)	CM/RM/LM	2020	28 May 1992 (age 33)	(Wales) Swansea City	2021	50	0
26	Faysal Bettache	(England)	RW	2014	7 July 2000 (age 25)	(England) Watford	2021	11	0
30	Charlie Owens	(Northern Ireland)	CM/DM	2017	7 December 1997 (age 28)	(England) Tottenham Hotspur	2021	3	0
37	Albert Adomah	(Ghana)	RW	2020	13 December 1987 (age 38)	(England) Nottingham Forest	2022	35	2
Forwards
7	Macauley Bonne	(Zimbabwe)	CF	2020	26 October 1995 (age 30)	(England) Charlton Athletic	2023	35	3
9	Lyndon Dykes	(Scotland)	CF	2020	7 October 1995 (age 30)	(Scotland) Livingston	2024	42	12
27	Marco Ramkilde	(Denmark)	CF	2020	9 May 1998 (age 28)	(Denmark) AaB Fodbold	2021	1	0
29	Charlie Kelman	(United States)	CF	2020	2 November 2001 (age 24)	(England) Southend United	2023	12	0
34	Ody Alfa	(Nigeria)	CF	2013	9 March 1999 (age 27)	(England) Queens Park Rangers Academy	2021	0	0
45	Charlie Austin	(England)	CF	2021	5 July 1989 (age 36)	(England) West Brom	Loan	110	56

== Kit ==
Errea continued as manufacturers of QPR's kit. Bookmaker Football Index became new kit sponsors. In march Senate Bespoke Construction were announced as new shirt front sponsor

Home	Home alt.	Away	Away 1st alt.	Away 2nd alt.	Third

=== Kit information ===
QPR agreed a multi-year partnership with Erreà as the official technical kit suppliers, the 2020–21 season will be the fourth year of the deal. The kits will be 100 percent bespoke designs for the duration of the deal.

On 20 August 2020 QPR announced Football Index as the main shirt sponsor for the 2020–21 season on a one-year deal with an option for a further year.

On 12 March 2021 Football Index went into administration and the sponsorship deal with Queen's Park Rangers was cancelled, Senate Bespoke became the new shirt sponsor of Queen's Park Rangers.

== Transfers ==
=== Transfers in ===
Date	Position	Nationality	Name	From	Fee	Ref.
27 July 2020	AM	(Wales)	George Thomas	(England) Leicester City	Free transfer	
17 August 2020	CM	(England)	Luke Amos	(England) Tottenham Hotspur	£700,000	
19 August 2020	FW	(Scotland)	Lyndon Dykes	(Scotland) Livingston	£2,000,000	
1 September 2020	CB	(England)	Rob Dickie	(England) Oxford United	£1,500,000	
4 September 2020	CM	(England)	Tom Carroll	Free agent	Free transfer	
2 October 2020	CF	(Zimbabwe)	Macauley Bonne	(England) Charlton Athletic	£2,000,000	
5 October 2020	RW	(Ghana)	Albert Adomah	(England) Nottingham Forest	Free transfer	
5 October 2020	LW	(England)	Chris Willock	(Portugal) Benfica	£750,000	
14 October 2020	CF	(United States)	Charlie Kelman	(England) Southend United	£300,000	
19 October 2020	CF	(England)	Manasse Mampala	(England) Everton	Free transfer	
22 October 2020	CF	(Republic of Ireland)	Sinclair Armstrong	(Republic of Ireland) Shamrock Rovers	Undisclosed	
28 January 2021	GK	(England)	Joe Walsh	(England) Gillingham	Undisclosed	
15 March 2021	CM	(England)	Reece Cole	Free agent	Free transfer	

=== Loans in ===
Date from	Position	Nationality	Name	From	Date until	Ref.
9 January 2021	CF	(England)	Charlie Austin	(England) West Bromwich Albion	End of season	
14 January 2021	CB	(Netherlands)	Jordy de Wijs	(England) Hull City	End of season	
26 January 2021	CM	(Norway)	Stefan Johansen	(England) Fulham	End of season	
1 February 2021	CM	(England)	Sam Field	(England) West Bromwich Albion	End of season	

=== Transfers out ===
Date	Position	Nationality	Name	To	Fee	Ref.
1 July 2020	CB	(United States)	Giles Phillips	(England) Wycombe Wanderers	Released	
1 July 2020	LW	(England)	Marc Pugh	(England) Shewsbury Town	Released	
1 July 2020	CB	(England)	Charlie Rowan	(England) Ebbsfleet United	Released	
1 July 2020	LW	(England)	Lewis Walker	(Italy) Como 1907	Released	
31 July 2020	CB	(England)	Grant Hall	(England) Middlesbrough	Free transfer	
14 August 2020	RB	(Spain)	Ángel Rangel	Unattached	Released	
28 August 2020	AM	(England)	Ebere Eze	(England) Crystal Palace	£19,500,000	
28 August 2020	CB	(Germany)	Toni Leistner	(Germany) Hamburg	Free transfer	
16 October 2020	LB	(Republic of Ireland)	Ryan Manning	(Wales) Swansea City	Undisclosed	
27 January 2021	RW	(Nigeria)	Bright Osayi-Samuel	(Turkey) Fenerbahçe	Undisclosed	
5 May 2021	CB	(United States)	Geoff Cameron	(United States) Cincinnati	Undisclosed	
19 May 2021	GK	(England)	Joe Lumley	(England) Middlesbrough	Free transfer	
20 May 2021	FW	(Northern Ireland)	Paul Smyth	Unattached	Released	
20 May 2021	FW	(England)	Aramide Oteh	Unattached	Released	

=== Loans out ===
Date from	Position	Nationality	Name	To	Date until	Ref.
14 July 2020	LM	(England)	Deshane Dalling	(Republic of Ireland) Cork City	31 December 2020	
5 September 2020	CB	(Republic of Ireland)	Nathan Carlyle	(England) Concord Rangers	30 September 2020	
8 September 2020	GK	(England)	Dillon Barnes	(Scotland) Hibernian	17 January 2021	
10 September 2020	MF	(England)	Amrit Bansal-McNulty	(Italy) Como 1907	End of season	
2 October 2020	DF	(England)	Aaron Drewe	(England) Oxford City	16 January 2021	
2 October 2020	FW	(England)	Charley Kendall	(England) Eastbourne Borough	November 2020	
2 October 2020	DF	(England)	Kai Woollard-Innocent	(England) Eastbourne Borough	November 2020	
6 October 2020	GK	(Poland)	Marcin Brzozowski	(England) Billericay Town	1 January 2021	
6 October 2020	CB	(England)	Joe Gubbins	(England) Oxford City	November 2020	
16 October 2020	FW	(England)	Aramide Oteh	(England) Stevenage	18 January 2021	
16 October 2020	MF	(Republic of Ireland)	Olamide Shodipo	(England) Oxford United	End of season	
16 October 2020	FW	(Northern Ireland)	Paul Smyth	(England) Charlton Athletic	28 January 2021	
21 October 2020	CB	(Republic of Ireland)	Nathan Carlyle	(England) Hemel Hempstead Town	November 2020	
21 October 2020	RM	(Guyana)	Stephen Duke-McKenna	(England) Hemel Hempstead Town	November 2020	
30 October 2020	GK	(England)	Joe Lumley	(England) Gillingham	6 November 2020	
20 November 2020	GK	(England)	Joe Lumley	(England) Doncaster Rovers	25 December 2020	
6 January 2021	GK	(Scotland)	Liam Kelly	(Scotland) Motherwell	End of season	
14 January 2021	CB	(Greece)	Themis Kefalas	(England) Barnet	End of season	
18 January 2021	GK	(England)	Dillon Barnes	(England) Burton Albion	End of season	
19 January 2021	CB	(Republic of Ireland)	Conor Masterson	(England) Swindon Town	End of season	
19 January 2021	CF	(England)	Aramide Oteh	(England) Colchester United	End of season	
28 January 2021	SS	(Northern Ireland)	Paul Smyth	(England) Accrington Stanley	End of season	
27 February 2021	GK	(Poland)	Marcin Brzozowski	(England) Torquay United	March 2021	

== Pre-season and friendlies ==
For the 2020/21 season, QPR have announced pre-season friendlies against AFC Wimbledon and Oxford United.

Win Draw Loss Fixtures

22 August 2020 Friendly	Queens Park Rangers	3–0	AFC Wimbledon	Shepherd's Bush, London
13:00 BST	Chair 15'; Dykes 43'; Osew 48' (o.g.)	Report		Stadium: Loftus Road

29 August 2020 Friendly	Oxford United	1–0	Queens Park Rangers	Oxford
14:00 BST	Taylor 63'	Report		Stadium: Kassam Stadium

1 September 2020 Friendly	Arsenal	4–3	Queens Park Rangers	London Colney
	Lacazette; Smith Rowe; John-Jules; Aubameyang	Report	Kakay; Osayi-Samuel; Kane	Stadium: Arsenal Training Centre

== Competitions ==
=== Overview ===
Competition	First match	Last match	Starting round	Record							
Competition	First match	Last match	Starting round	Pld	W	D	L	GF	GA	GD	Win %
EFL Championship	11 September 2020	8 May 2021	Matchday 1	46	19	11	16	57	55	+2	41.30
FA Cup	9 January 2021	9 January 2021	Third round	1	0	0	1	0	2	−2	0.00
Carabao Cup	5 September 2020	5 September 2020	Third round	1	0	0	1	2	3	−1	0.00
Total				48	19	11	18	59	60	−1	39.58

Last updated: 8 May 2021
Source: Competitions

=== Sky Bet Championship ===
==== League table ====
Pos	Team	Pld	W	D	L	GF	GA	GD	Pts	Promotion, qualification or relegation
6	Bournemouth	46	22	11	13	73	46	+27	77	Qualification for Championship play-offs
7	Reading	46	19	13	14	62	54	+8	70	
8	Cardiff City	46	18	14	14	66	49	+17	68	
9	Queens Park Rangers	46	19	11	16	57	55	+2	68	
10	Middlesbrough	46	18	10	18	55	53	+2	64	
11	Millwall	46	15	17	14	47	52	−5	62	
12	Luton Town	46	17	11	18	41	52	−11	62	

Source: EFL Official Website
Rules for classification: 1) Points; 2) Goal difference; 3) Number of goals scored; 4) Head-to-head results; 5) Wins; 6) Away goals; 7) Penalty points (sec 9.5); 8) 12-point sending off offences

==== Results summary ====
Overall								Home						Away					
Pld	W	D	L	GF	GA	GD	Pts	W	D	L	GF	GA	GD	W	D	L	GF	GA	GD
46	19	11	16	57	55	+2	68	11	4	8	32	27	+5	8	7	8	25	28	−3

Last updated: 8 May 2021.

==== Results by matchday ====
Matchday	1	2	3	4	5	6	7	8	9	10	11	12	13	14	15	16	17	18	19	20	21	22	23	24	25	26	27	28	29	30	31	32	33	34	35	36	37	38	39	40	41	42	43	44	45	46
Ground	H	A	H	A	A	H	H	A	H	A	A	H	H	A	H	A	A	H	H	A	H	A	A	A	H	A	H	H	H	A	A	H	A	H	H	H	A	H	A	H	A	A	A	H	A	H
Result	W	L	D	D	D	L	D	L	W	W	L	D	W	L	L	L	D	L	D	D	L	D	W	W	L	W	W	W	W	D	L	L	W	W	L	W	D	W	L	W	L	W	W	L	W	W
Position	2	12	11	9	14	16	16	19	18	16	18	18	13	15	17	18	18	19	19	19	19	19	18	17	17	17	16	16	13	13	17	17	16	12	13	12	12	12	12	11	11	10	8	10	9	9

Updated to match(es) played on 8 May 2021. Source: BBC Sport
A = Away; H = Home; W = Win; D = Draw; L = Loss

==== Matches ====
The 2020–21 season fixtures were released on 21 August.

12 September 2020 1	Queens Park Rangers	2–0	Nottingham Forest	Shepherd's Bush, London
15:00 BST	Dykes 54' (pen.) (yellow card) 77'; Chair 90+4'	Report	Figueiredo (yellow card) 53'; Lawrence-Gabriel (yellow card) 62'	Stadium: Kiyan Prince Foundation Stadium; Referee: Tim Robinson

18 September 2020 2	Coventry City	3–2	Queens Park Rangers	Birmingham
19:45 BST	Godden 44'; O'Hare 50'; Shipley (yellow card) 60'; McFadzean 84'	Report	Dykes 41' (pen.); Chair (yellow card) 65'; Barbet 75'; Wallace (yellow card) 88'	Stadium: St Andrew's Stadium; Referee: Steve Martin

26 September 2020 3	Queens Park Rangers	1–1	Middlesbrough	Shepherd's Bush, London
15:00 BST	Osayi-Samuel 28'	Report	Akpom 19'; Dijksteel (yellow card) 85'	Stadium: Kiyan Prince Foundation Stadium; Attendance: 0 Referee: Dean Whitestone

3 October 2020 4	Sheffield Wednesday	1–1	Queens Park Rangers	Owlerton, Sheffield
15:00 BST	Paterson (yellow card) 52'; Barbet 54' (o.g.); Luongo (yellow card) 63'	Report	Barbet (yellow card) 77'; Bonne 90+5'	Stadium: Hillsborough; Attendance: 0 Referee: Graham Salisbury

17 October 2020 5	Bournemouth	0–0	Queens Park Rangers	Kings Park
15:00 BST	Rico (yellow card) 48'	Report	Kakay (yellow card) 42'; Osayi-Samuel (yellow card) 45+2'; Chair (yellow card) 55'	Stadium: Vitality Stadium; Attendance: 0 Referee: John Brooks

21 October 2020 6	Queens Park Rangers	0–2	Preston North End	Shepherd's Bush, London
19:45 BST		Report	Ledson (yellow card) 15'; Johnson 24' (pen.); Sinclair 60' (pen.)	Stadium: Kiyan Prince Foundation Stadium; Attendance: 0 Referee: Kevin Friend

24 October 2020 7	Queens Park Rangers	0–0	Birmingham City	Shepherd's Bush, London
15:00 BST	Dickie (yellow card) 18'	Report		Stadium: Kiyan Prince Foundation Stadium; Attendance: 0 Referee: Simon Hooper

27 October 2020 8	Barnsley	3–0	Queens Park Rangers	Barnsley
19:00 GMT	Woodrow 27' (pen.); Chaplin 37'; Barbet 64' (o.g.)	Report	Dickie (red card) 26'	Stadium: Oakwell; Attendance: 0 Referee: Andy Davies

31 October 2020 9	Queens Park Rangers	3–2	Cardiff City	Shepherd's Bush, London
15:00 GMT	Chair 15' (yellow card) 15'; Kane 27' (yellow card) 45+3'; Cameron (yellow card) 31'; Barbet (yellow card) 48'; Ball 90+1'	Report	Ralls (yellow card) 22' (goal) 49' (pen.), 85' (penalty missed) 85'; Bacuna (yellow card) 38'; Tomlin (yellow card) 75'	Stadium: Kiyan Prince Foundation Stadium; Attendance: 0 Referee: Andy Woolmer

4 November 2020 10	Derby County	0–1	Queens Park Rangers	Derby
19:45 GMT	Kazim-Richards (yellow card) 90+2'	Report	Bonne 88'	Stadium: Pride Park Stadium; Attendance: 0 Referee: Gavin Ward

7 November 2020 11	Blackburn Rovers	3–1	Queens Park Rangers	Blackburn
15:00 GMT	Brereton 50'; Johnson (yellow card) 65'; Armstrong 73', 90+6'	Report	Kane (yellow card) 9'; Dickie (yellow card) 23'; Dykes 61' (pen.); Bonne (yellow card) 90+3'	Stadium: Ewood Park; Attendance: 0 Referee: Tim Robinson

21 November 2020 12	Queens Park Rangers	1–1	Watford	Shepherd's Bush, London
15:00 GMT	Chair 77'; Dykes (yellow card) 90+1'	Report	Wilmot 3'; Sema (yellow card) 59'; Cathcart (yellow card) 85'	Stadium: Kiyan Prince Foundation Stadium; Attendance: 0 Referee: Michael Salisbury

24 November 2020 13	Queens Park Rangers	3–2	Rotherham United	Shepherd's Bush, London
19:45 GMT	Chair 20'; Osayi-Samuel 45+1'; Dykes 45+5' (pen.)	Report	Smith 38'; Wiles (yellow card) 45+3'; Ihiekwe (yellow card) 80'; Ladapo 84'; Crooks (yellow card) 90+1'	Stadium: Kiyan Prince Foundation Stadium; Attendance: 0 Referee: Oliver Langford

27 November 2020 14	Brentford	2–1	Queens Park Rangers	Brentford
19:45 GMT	Janelt 14'; Sørensen (yellow card) 39'; Toney 64'; Canós (yellow card) 90+5'	Report	Dykes 26'; Hämäläinen (yellow card) 29'; Kane (yellow card) 66' (yellow-red card) 84'; Ball (yellow card) 74'	Stadium: Brentford Community Stadium; Attendance: 0 Referee: Matt Donohue

1 December 2020 15	Queens Park Rangers	1–2	Bristol City	Shepherd's Bush, London
19:45 GMT	Dickie 12' (yellow card) 27'; Carroll (yellow card) 69'	Report	Wells 40' (yellow card) 57'; Nagy 50'	Stadium: Kiyan Prince Foundation Stadium; Attendance: 0 Referee: James Linington

5 December 2020 16	Huddersfield Town	2–0	Queens Park Rangers	Huddersfield
15:00 GMT	Koroma 3'; Toffolo 39'	Report	Ball (yellow card) 62'; Osayi-Samuel (yellow card) 71'	Stadium: John Smith's Stadium; Attendance: 0 Referee: Dean Whitestone

8 December 2020 17	Millwall	1–1	Queens Park Rangers	Bermondsey
19:45 GMT	Böðvarsson 70'	Report	Ball (yellow card) 16'; Chair 53'; Barbet (yellow card) 75'; Bonne (yellow card) 90+1'	Stadium: The Den; Attendance: 2,000; Referee: Jarred Gillett

12 December 2020 18	Queens Park Rangers	0–1	Reading	Shepherd's Bush, London
15:00 GMT	Carroll (yellow card) 67'	Report	Olise 89'	Stadium: Kiyan Prince Foundation Stadium; Attendance: 2,000; Referee: Tony Harrington

15 December 2020 19	Queens Park Rangers	0–0	Stoke City	Shepherd's Bush, London
17:30 GMT	Barbet (yellow card) 31'; Hämäläinen (yellow card) 50'	Report	Souttar (yellow card) 86'	Stadium: Kiyan Prince Foundation Stadium; Attendance: 2,000; Referee: Keith Stroud

19 December 2020 20	Wycombe Wanderers	1–1	Queens Park Rangers	High Wycombe
15:00 GMT	Jacobson (yellow card) 51'; Allsop (yellow card) 86'; Mehmeti 88'	Report	McCarthy 29' (o.g.); Hämäläinen (yellow card) 90+2'	Stadium: Adams Park; Attendance: 0 Referee: Gavin Ward

26 December 2020 21	Queens Park Rangers	0–2	Swansea City	Shepherd's Bush, London
15:00 GMT	Ball (yellow card) 79'	Report	Dhanda (yellow card) 34'; Ayew 44'; Lowe 54'	Stadium: Kiyan Prince Foundation Stadium; Attendance: 0 Referee: Steve Martin

29 December 2020 22	Norwich City	1–1	Queens Park Rangers	Norwich
19:45 GMT	Pukki 75' (pen.); Zimmermann (yellow card) 84'; McLean (yellow card) 87'; Skipp (yellow card) 90'	Report	Kane (yellow card) 22'; Ball (yellow card) 73'; Dickie (yellow card) 75'; Osayi-Samuel 84' (pen.) (yellow card) 90+1'; Carroll (yellow card) 88'; Bonne (yellow card) 90+4'	Stadium: Carrow Road; Attendance: 0 Referee: Oliver Langford

2 January 2021 –	Luton Town	P–P	Queens Park Rangers	Luton
15:00 GMT		Report		Stadium: Kenilworth Road
Note: The match was postponed on 1 January 2021 due to positive COVID-19 tests among Luton Town's players and staff.

12 January 2021 23	Luton Town	0–2	Queens Park Rangers	Luton
19:00 GMT		Report	Austin 39'; Bonne 89' (yellow card) 90'	Stadium: Kenilworth Road; Attendance: 0 Referee: Andy Woolmer

16 January 2021 –	Queens Park Rangers	P–P	Wycombe Wanderers	Shepherd's Bush, London
15:00 GMT				Stadium: Kiyan Prince Foundation Stadium
Note: The match was postponed on 15 January 2021 due to positive COVID-19 tests among Wycombe Wanderers' players and staff.

20 January 2021 24	Cardiff City	0–1	Queens Park Rangers	Cardiff
19:00 GMT		Report	Barbet (yellow card) 36'; Cameron (yellow card) 48'; Willock 71'; Chair (yellow card) 89'	Stadium: Cardiff City Stadium; Attendance: 0 Referee: Darren Bond

23 January 2021 25	Queens Park Rangers	0–1	Derby County	Shepherd's Bush, London
15:00 GMT	Cameron (yellow card) 31'; Kane (yellow card) 51'	Report	Kazim-Richards 56'; Shinnie (yellow card) 77'	Stadium: Kiyan Prince Foundation Stadium; Attendance: 0 Referee: Tim Robinson

30 January 2021 26	Watford	1–2	Queens Park Rangers	Watford
19:45 GMT	Deeney 52' (pen.); Sierralta (yellow card) 54'; Navarro (yellow card) 90+3'	Report	Wallace (yellow card) 33'; Austin 73'; Adomah 90'	Stadium: Vicarage Road; Attendance: 0 Referee: Jarred Gillett

6 February 2021 27	Queens Park Rangers	1–0	Blackburn Rovers	Shepherd's Bush, London
15:00 GMT	Austin (yellow card) 5'; Ball (yellow card) 20'; Barbet 54'; Adomah (yellow card) 90+2'	Report	Davenport (yellow card) 9'; Gallagher (yellow card) 60'	Stadium: Kiyan Prince Foundation Stadium; Attendance: 0 Referee: Tony Harrington

13 February 2021 –	Rotherham United	P–P	Queens Park Rangers	Rotherham
15:00 GMT				Stadium: New York Stadium
Note: The match was postponed on 12 February 2021 due a frozen pitch.

17 February 2021 28	Queens Park Rangers	2–1	Brentford	Shepherd's Bush, London
19:00 GMT	Field 72'; Austin 76'	Report	Toney 30'	Stadium: Kiyan Prince Foundation Stadium; Attendance: 0 Referee: Gavin Ward

20 February 2021 29	Queens Park Rangers	2–1	Bournemouth	Shepherd's Bush, London
15:00 GMT	Barbet (yellow card) 27'; Chair (yellow card) 37'; Johansen 58'; Kane (yellow card) 81', (goal) 83'	Report	Mepham (yellow card) 45+1'; Long 69'	Stadium: Kiyan Prince Foundation Stadium; Attendance: 0 Referee: Darren Bond

24 February 2021 30	Preston North End	0–0	Queens Park Rangers	Preston
19:45 GMT		Report	Johansen (yellow card) 70'; Dickie (yellow card) 72'	Stadium: Deepdale; Attendance: 0 Referee: Darren England

27 February 2021 31	Birmingham City	2–1	Queens Park Rangers	Bordesley
15:00 GMT	Pedersen (yellow card) 52', (goal) 82'; Halilović 85', (yellow card) 86'; Roberts (yellow card) 90+6'	Report	Willock (yellow card) 13'; Austin 44'; Bonne (yellow card) 73'	Stadium: St Andrew's Stadium; Attendance: 0 Referee: David Webb

3 March 2021 32	Queens Park Rangers	1–3	Barnsley	Shepherd's Bush
19:00 GMT	Austin 27'; Dickie (yellow card) 89'	Report	Dike 23'; Mowatt 29'; Morris 57'	Stadium: Kiyan Prince Foundation Stadium; Attendance: 0 Referee: Andy Woolmer

6 March 2021 33	Bristol City	0–2	Queens Park Rangers	Bristol
15:00 GMT	Lansbury (yellow card) 84'; Diédhiou (yellow card) 88'	Report	Chair 11'; Dickie 22', (yellow card) 74'; Kakay (yellow card) 71'; Ball (yellow card) 76'	Stadium: Ashton Gate; Attendance: 0 Referee: Tony Harrington

9 March 2021 34	Queens Park Rangers	1–0	Wycombe Wanderers	Shepherd's Bush
19:00 GMT	Chair 23'	Report		Stadium: Kiyan Prince Foundation Stadium; Attendance: 0 Referee: Simon Hooper

13 March 2021 35	Queens Park Rangers	0–1	Huddersfield Town	Shepherd's Bush
15:00 GMT	Johansen (yellow card) 86'	Report	Bacuna 55'	Stadium: Kiyan Prince Foundation Stadium; Attendance: 0 Referee: Michael Salisbury

17 March 2021 36	Queens Park Rangers	3–2	Millwall	Shepherd's Bush
19:00 GMT	Austin 51' de Wijs (yellow card) 56', (goal) 86'; Johansen 67', (yellow card) 88'	Report	Wallace 6'; Bennett 39'	Stadium: Kiyan Prince Foundation Stadium; Attendance: 0 Referee: Jarred Gillett

20 March 2021 37	Reading	1–1	Queens Park Rangers	Reading
15:00 GMT	Méïté 57'	Report	Dykes 45'; Chair (yellow card) 52'	Stadium: The Madejski Stadium; Attendance: 0 Referee: Dean Whitestone

2 April 2021 38	Queens Park Rangers	3–0	Coventry City	Shepherd's Bush
15:00 BST	Willock 2'; Rose 22' (o.g.); Chair 68'; Ball (yellow card) 85'	Report		Stadium: Kiyan Prince Foundation Stadium; Attendance: 0 Referee: Jeremy Simpson

5 April 2021 39	Nottingham Forest	3–1	Queens Park Rangers	West Bridgford
15:00 BST	Yates (yellow card) 32'; Mighten 44'; Grabban 63'; Krovinović (yellow card) 66'; Garner 69'; Christie (yellow card) 89'	Report	Johansen (yellow card) 73'; Dykes 90+3'	Stadium: The City Ground; Attendance: 0 Referee: Keith Stroud

10 April 2021 40	Queens Park Rangers	4–1	Sheffield Wednesday	Shepherd's Bush
15:00 BST	Dykes 27', 60'; Johansen 50'; Field (yellow card) 64'; Kakay (yellow card) 90'; Willock 90+2'	Report	Windass 30'	Stadium: Kiyan Prince Foundation Stadium; Attendance: 0 Referee: John Brooks

13 April 2021 41	Rotherham United	3–1	Queens Park Rangers	Rotherham
19:00 BST	S. MacDonald (yellow card) 38'; A. MacDonald (yellow card) 41'; Ladapo 64', 66'; Smith (yellow card) 70', (goal) 90'; Wood (yellow card) 75'	Report	Dykes 52'	Stadium: New York Stadium; Attendance: 0 Referee: Dean Whitestone

17 April 2021 42	Middlesbrough	1–2	Queens Park Rangers	Middlesbrough
12:30 BST	Bolasie 28'	Report	Dickie 15'; Wallace 18'; Kakay (yellow card) 31'; Dieng (red card) 58'	Stadium: Riverside Stadium; Attendance: 0 Referee: Matt Donohue

20 April 2021 43	Swansea City	0–1	Queens Park Rangers	Swansea
19:00 BST	Fulton (yellow card) 23'	Report	Dickie (yellow card) 55'; Austin (yellow card) 85'; Dykes 89'; Hämäläinen (yellow card) 90+2'; Lumley (yellow card) 90+4'	Stadium: Liberty Stadium; Attendance: 0 Referee: Jarred Gillett

24 April 2021 44	Queens Park Rangers	1–3	Norwich City	Shepherd's Bush
15:00 BST	Dykes (penalty missed) 54, 71'; Field (yellow card) 68'	Report	Quintillà 32'; Aarons 57'; Buendía 82'	Stadium: Kiyan Prince Foundation Stadium; Attendance: 0 Referee: James Linington

1 May 2021 45	Stoke City	0–2	Queens Park Rangers	Stoke-on-Trent
15:00 BST	Brown (yellow card) 86'	Report	Austin 17'; Barbet (yellow card) 28'; Kakay 70'; Bonne (yellow card) 90'	Stadium: Bet365 Stadium; Attendance: 0 Referee: Craig Pawson

8 May 2021 46	Queens Park Rangers	3–1	Luton Town	Shepherd's Bush
12:30 BST	Austin (yellow card) 1' (goal) 20'; Johansen 60'; Adomah 90+2'	Report	Dewsbury-Hall 43'; Rea (yellow card) 45+2'	Stadium: Kiyan Prince Foundation Stadium; Attendance: 0 Referee: Tony Harrington

=== Emirates FA Cup ===
The third round draw was made on 30 November, with Premier League and EFL Championship clubs all entering the competition.

9 January 2021 Third round	Queens Park Rangers	0–2 (a.e.t.)	Fulham (Premier League)	Shepherd's Bush, London
15:00 GMT	Cameron (yellow card) 35'; Barbet (yellow card) 112'; Hämäläinen (yellow card) 115'	Report	Decordova-Reid 104'; Kebano 105+3'	Stadium: Kiyan Prince Foundation Stadium; Attendance: 0 Referee: Simon Hooper

=== Carabao Cup ===
The first round draw was made on 18 August.

Win Draw Loss

5 September 2020 First round	Plymouth Argyle (League One)	3–2	Queens Park Rangers	Plymouth
12:30 BST	Edwards 32'; Mayor 55'; Nouble 78' (yellow card) 82'	Report	Manning 2'; Kakay 57'	Stadium: Home Park; Attendance: 0 Referee: Antony Coggins

== Squad statistics ==
=== Statistics ===
As of 8 May 2021

No.	Pos	Nat	Player	Total		Sky Bet Championship		Carabao Cup		Emirates FA Cup	
No.	Pos	Nat	Player	Apps	Goals	Apps	Goals	Apps	Goals	Apps	Goals
1	GK	(England) ENG	Joe Lumley	6	0	4+1	0	1	0	0	0
2	DF	(England) ENG	Todd Kane	29	2	24+4	2	0	0	1	0
3	DF	(Scotland) SCO	Lee Wallace	27	1	27	1	0	0	0	0
4	DF	(England) ENG	Rob Dickie	45	3	43	3	1	0	1	0
5	DF	(Netherlands) NED	Jordy de Wijs	9	1	9	1	0	0	0	0
6	DF	(France) FRA	Yoann Barbet	47	2	46	2	0	0	1	0
7	FW	(Zimbabwe) ZIM	Macauley Bonne	35	3	8+26	3	0	0	1	0
8	MF	(England) ENG	Luke Amos	6	0	5	0	1	0	0	0
9	FW	(Scotland) SCO	Lyndon Dykes	44	12	36+7	12	0	0	1	0
10	MF	(Morocco) MAR	Ilias Chair	47	8	43+2	8	1	0	1	0
12	MF	(England) ENG	Dominic Ball	41	1	24+15	1	1	0	1	0
13	GK	(Senegal) SEN	Seny Dieng	42	0	41	0	0	0	1	0
14	MF	(Norway) NOR	Stefan Johansen	21	4	21	4	0	0	0	0
15	MF	(England) ENG	Sam Field	19	1	8+11	1	0	0	0	0
19	MF	(Wales) WAL	George Thomas	19	0	4+14	0	0	0	0+1	0
20	DF	(United States) USA	Geoff Cameron	34	0	30+3	0	0	0	1	0
21	FW	(England) ENG	Chris Willock	38	3	20+18	3	0	0	0	0
22	MF	(England) ENG	Tom Carroll	23	0	18+3	0	1	0	1	0
24	DF	(Sierra Leone) SLE	Osman Kakay	29	2	23+5	1	1	1	0	0
25	DF	(Finland) FIN	Niko Hämäläinen	23	0	18+4	0	0	0	0+1	0
26	MF	(England) ENG	Faysal Bettache	8	0	0+6	0	0+1	0	0+1	0
27	FW	(Denmark) DEN	Marco Ramkilde	0	0	0	0	0	0	0	0
29	FW	(United States) USA	Charlie Kelman	12	0	1+10	0	0	0	0+1	0
30	MF	(Northern Ireland) NIR	Charlie Owens	0	0	0	0	0	0	0	0
34	FW	(Nigeria) NGA	Ody Alfa	0	0	0	0	0	0	0	0
37	FW	(Ghana) GHA	Albert Adomah	36	2	8+28	2	0	0	0	0
41	DF	(Guyana) GUY	Stephen Duke-McKenna	1	0	0+1	0	0	0	0	0
45	FW	(England) ENG	Charlie Austin	20	8	18+2	8	0	0	0	0
Out on Loan
17	MF	(Republic of Ireland) IRL	Olamide Shodipo	1	0	0	0	0+1	0	0	0
18	FW	(England) ENG	Aramide Oteh	1	0	0	0	1	0	0	0
23	DF	(Republic of Ireland) IRL	Conor Masterson	6	0	3+1	0	1	0	0+1	0
32	GK	(Scotland) SCO	Liam Kelly	0	0	0	0	0	0	0	0
38	FW	(Northern Ireland) NIR	Paul Smyth	4	0	0+3	0	0+1	0	0	0
40	DF	(England) ENG	Joe Gubbins	0	0	0	0	0	0	0	0
Left During the Season
14	DF	(Republic of Ireland) IRL	Ryan Manning	1	1	0	0	1	1	0	0
11	MF	(Nigeria) NGA	Bright Osayi-Samuel	23	3	20+1	3	1	0	1	0

=== Goals ===
As of 8 May 2021

Rank	Player	Position	Championship	League Cup	FA Cup	Total
1	(Scotland) Lyndon Dykes	FW	12	0	0	12
2	(England) Charlie Austin	FW	8	0	0	8
2	(Morocco) Ilias Chair	MF	8	0	0	8
4	(Norway) Stefan Johansen	MF	4	0	0	4
5	(Zimbabwe) Macauley Bonne	FW	3	0	0	3
5	(England) Rob Dickie	DF	3	0	0	3
5	(Nigeria) Bright Osayi-Samuel	MF	3	0	0	3
5	(England) Chris Willock	MF	3	0	0	3
9	(Ghana) Albert Adomah	MF	2	0	0	2
9	(France) Yoann Barbet	DF	2	0	0	2
9	(Sierra Leone) Osman Kakay	DF	1	1	0	2
9	(England) Todd Kane	DF	2	0	0	2
12	(England) Dominic Ball	MF	1	0	0	1
12	(Netherlands) Jordy de Wijs	DF	1	0	0	1
12	(England) Sam Field	MF	1	0	0	1
12	(Republic of Ireland) Ryan Manning	DF	0	1	0	1
12	(Scotland) Lee Wallace	DF	1	0	0	1
Own goal			2	0	0	2
Total			57	2	0	59

=== Clean sheets ===
As of 8 May 2021

Rank	Player	Position	Championship	League Cup	FA Cup	Total
1	(Senegal) Seny Dieng	GK	11	0	0	11
2	(England) Joe Lumley	GK	3	0	0	3
Total			14	0	0	14

=== Disciplinary record ===
As of 8 May 2021

No.	Pos.	Name	Championship		FA Cup		League Cup		Total	
No.	Pos.	Name	Booked	Sent off (straight red)	Booked	Sent off (straight red)	Booked	Sent off (straight red)	Booked	Sent off (straight red)
1	GK	Joe Lumley	1	0	0	0	0	0	1	0
2	DF	Todd Kane	6	1	0	0	0	0	6	1
3	DF	Lee Wallace	2	0	0	0	0	0	2	0
4	DF	Rob Dickie	9	1	0	0	0	0	9	1
6	DF	Yoann Barbet	7	0	1	0	0	0	8	0
7	FW	Macauley Bonne	6	0	0	0	0	0	6	0
8	MF	Luke Amos	0	0	0	0	0	0	0	0
9	FW	Lyndon Dykes	2	0	0	0	0	0	2	0
10	MF	Ilias Chair	6	0	0	0	0	0	6	0
11	MF	Bright Osayi-Samuel	3	0	0	0	0	0	3	0
12	DF	Dominic Ball	9	0	0	0	0	0	9	0
13	GK	Seny Dieng	1	1	0	0	0	0	1	1
14	MF	Ryan Manning	0	0	0	0	0	0	0	0
17	MF	Olamide Shodipo	0	0	0	0	0	0	0	0
18	FW	Aramide Oteh	0	0	0	0	0	0	0	0
19	MF	George Thomas	0	0	0	0	0	0	0	0
20	DF	Geoff Cameron	4	0	1	0	0	0	5	0
21	FW	Chris Willock	1	0	0	0	0	0	1	0
22	MF	Tom Carroll	3	0	0	0	0	0	3	0
23	DF	Conor Masterson	0	0	0	0	0	0	0	0
24	DF	Osman Kakay	4	0	0	0	0	0	4	0
25	DF	Niko Hämäläinen	4	0	1	0	0	0	5	0
26	MF	Faysal Bettache	0	0	0	0	0	0	0	0
37	MF	Albert Adomah	1	0	0	0	0	0	1	0
38	FW	Paul Smyth	0	0	0	0	0	0	0	0
Total			79	3	3	0	0	0	82	3
