= 2019–20 Queens Park Rangers F.C. season =

English football club season

Queens Park Rangers
2019–20 season
- Owner: Tune Group
- Chairman: Amit Bhatia
- Manager: Mark Warburton
- Stadium: Loftus Road
- EFL Championship: 13th
- FA Cup: Fourth round (vs. Sheffield Wednesday)
- EFL Cup: Second round (vs. Portsmouth)
- Top goalscorer: League: Eberechi Eze (14 goals); All: Jordan Hugill; Nahki Wells (15 each)
- Highest home attendance: 16,186 vs. Luton Town (14 Sept. Championship)
- Lowest home attendance: 5,795 vs. Bristol City (13 Aug. EFL Cup)
- Average home league attendance: 13,721
- Biggest win: 6-1 vs Cardiff City (1 January 2020)
- Biggest defeat: 0-4 vs Nottingham Forest (27 November 2019)
Home colours	Away colours

The 2019–20 season was Queens Park Rangers' fifth consecutive season in the Championship. Along with the Championship, the club participated in the FA Cup and the EFL Cup.

== Players ==
=== First team squad ===
As of 22 July 2020

No.	Name	Nat	Position	Since	Date of birth (age)	Signed from	Contract expires	Games	Goals
Goalkeepers
1	Joe Lumley	(England)	GK	2013	15 February 1995 (age 31)	(England) Tottenham Hotspur	2021	78	0
32	Liam Kelly	(Scotland)	GK	2019	23 January 1996 (age 30)	(Scotland) Livingston	2023	22	0
33	Dillon Barnes	(England)	GK	2019	8 April 1996 (age 30)	(England) Colchester United	2021	0	0
Defenders
2	Todd Kane	(England)	RB	2019	17 September 1993 (age 33)	(England) Chelsea	2022	36	1
3	Lee Wallace	(Scotland)	LB	2019	1 August 1987 (age 39)	(Scotland) Rangers	2021	12	1
4	Grant Hall (C)	(England)	CB/DM	2015	29 October 1991 (age 34)	(England) Tottenham Hotspur	2020	130	6
14	Ryan Manning	(Republic of Ireland)	LB/CM/LM	2015	14 June 1996 (age 30)	(Republic of Ireland) Galway United	2021	95	8
22	Àngel Rangel	(Spain)	RB	2018	28 November 1982 (age 43)	(Wales) Swansea City	2020	41	2
23	Conor Masterson	(Republic of Ireland)	CB	2019	8 September 1998 (age 28)	(England) Liverpool	2021	14	1
24	Osman Kakay	(Sierra Leone)	RB	2015	25 August 1997 (age 29)	(England) Queens Park Rangers Academy	2021	19	0
29	Yoann Barbet	(France)	CB	2019	10 May 1993 (age 33)	(England) Brentford	2022	29	0
40	Joe Gubbins	(England)	CB	2017	3 August 2001 (age 25)	(England) Southampton	2020	2	0
Midfielders
5	Geoff Cameron	(United States)	DM/CB	2019	11 July 1985 (age 41)	(England) Stoke City	2021	56	2
7	Marc Pugh	(England)	LW	2019	2 April 1987 (age 39)	(England) Bournemouth	2020	31	2
8	Luke Amos	(England)	CM/DM	2019	23 February 1997 (age 29)	On loan from (England) Tottenham Hotspur	Loan	36	2
10	Eberechi Eze	(England)	AM	2016	29 June 1998 (age 28)	(England) Millwall	2021	112	20
11	Josh Scowen	(England)	DM	2017	28 March 1993 (age 33)	(England) Barnsley	2021	103	4
12	Dominic Ball	(England)	DM/CB/CM	2019	2 August 1995 (age 31)	(England) Rotherham United	2021	35	1
17	Olamide Shodipo	(Republic of Ireland)	RW/LW	2015	5 July 1997 (age 29)	(England) Queens Park Rangers Academy	2022	31	0
19	Ilias Chair	(Morocco)	AM/RM/LM	2017	30 October 1997 (age 28)	(Belgium) Lierse	2023	60	6
20	Bright Osayi-Samuel	(Nigeria)	RW/LW	2017	31 December 1997 (age 28)	(England) Blackpool	2021	92	10
26	Faysal Bettache	(England)	RW	2014	7 July 2000 (age 26)	(England) Watford	2021	4	0
30	Charlie Owens	(Northern Ireland)	CM/DM	2017	7 December 1997 (age 28)	(England) Tottenham Hotspur	2021	3	0
47	Jack Clarke	(England)	RW	2020	23 November 2000 (age 25)	On loan from (England) Tottenham Hotspur	Loan	7	0
Forwards
9	Jordan Hugill	(England)	CF	2019	4 June 1992 (age 34)	On loan from (England) West Ham	Loan	41	15
18	Aramide Oteh	(England)	CF	2017	10 September 1998 (age 28)	(England) Tottenham Hotspur	2021	20	2
21	Nahki Wells	(Bermuda)	CF	2019	1 June 1990 (age 36)	On loan from (England) Burnley	Loan	72	24
27	Marco Ramkilde	(Denmark)	CF	2019	9 May 1998 (age 28)	(Denmark) AaB Fodbold	2021	1	0

== Kit ==
Errea continued as manufacturers of QPR's kit. Bookmaker Royal Panda continued as kit sponsors. In mid -season Betuk were announced as new shirt front sponsor

Home	Home alt.	Home 2nd alt.	Away	Away alt.	Away 2nd alt.

=== Kit information ===
QPR agreed a multi-year partnership with Erreà as the official technical kit suppliers, the 2019/20 season will be the third year of the deal. The kits will be 100 per-cent bespoke designs for the duration of the deal.

The 2019/20 season will be the final year of a three-year shirt sponsorship deal with online casino Royal Panda. On 29 January 2020, it was confirmed that Leo-Vegas gaming company Bet UK would take over the sponsorship as QPR's main sponsor for the remainder of 2019/20 season.

It was confirmed that if there was a requirement for a third strip the 2018/19 pink away kit would be utilised.

== New contracts ==
No.	Position	Nationality	Player	Contract length	Contract end	Date	Source
—	GK	(Poland)	Marcin Brzozowski	1 year	2020	21 May 2019	
26	MF	(England)	Faysal Bettache	1 year	2020	25 May 2019	
—	MF	(England)	Amrit Bansal-McNulty	1 year	2020	29 May 2019	
—	DF	(England)	Charlie Rowan	1 year	2020	4 June 2019	
—	MF	(England)	Deshane Dalling	1 year	2020	6 June 2019	
—	FW	(England)	Lewis Walker	1 year	2020	7 June 2019	
—	MF	(England)	Dylan Duncan	1 year	2020	28 June 2019	
—	GK	(Switzerland)	Seny Dieng	2 years	2021	3 July 2019	
22	DF	(Spain)	Àngel Rangel	1 year	2020	5 July 2019	
30	MF	(Northern Ireland)	Charlie Owens	2 years	2021	15 August 2019	
17	MF	(Republic of Ireland)	Olamide Shodipo	3 years	2022	3 September 2019	
19	MF	(Morocco)	Ilias Chair	4 years	2023	19 September 2019	
—	MF	(England)	Deshane Dalling	1.5 years	2021	11 February 2020	
5	MF	(United States)	Geoff Cameron	1 year	2021	26 June 2020	

== Transfers ==
=== Transfers in ===
Date from	Position	Nationality	Name	From	Fee	Ref.
1 July 2019	CB	(France)	Yoann Barbet	Brentford	Free	
1 July 2019	CM	(England)	Dylan Duncan	Tottenham Hotspur	Free	
1 July 2019	GK	(Scotland)	Liam Kelly	(Scotland) Livingston	£50,000	
1 July 2019	LB	(Scotland)	Lee Wallace	(Scotland) Rangers	Free	
2 July 2019	CB	(England)	Dominic Ball	Rotherham United	Free	
3 July 2019	CB	(Republic of Ireland)	Conor Masterson	Liverpool	Free	
22 July 2019	GK	(England)	Dillon Barnes	Colchester United	Free	
25 July 2019	CB	(United States)	Geoff Cameron	Stoke City	Free	
27 July 2019	RB	(England)	Todd Kane	Chelsea	Free	
27 July 2019	LW	(England)	Marc Pugh	Bournemouth	Free	
27 August 2019	RM	(Guyana)	Stephen Duke-McKenna	Bolton Wanderers	Free	
17 March 2020	CF	(Denmark)	Marco Harboe Ramkilde	Free agent	Free	

=== Loans in ===
Date from	Position	Nationality	Name	From	Date until	Ref.
1 July 2019	DM	(England)	Luke Amos	Tottenham Hotspur	30 June 2020	
1 July 2019	DM	(Wales)	Matthew Smith	Manchester City	31 January 2020	
24 July 2019	CF	(Slovenia)	Jan Mlakar	Brighton & Hove Albion	31 January 2020	
28 July 2019	CF	(England)	Jordan Hugill	West Ham United	30 June 2020	
8 August 2019	CF	(Bermuda)	Nahki Wells	Burnley	27 January 2020	
16 January 2020	RW	(England)	Jack Clarke	Tottenham Hotspur	30 June 2020	

=== Loans out ===
Date from	Position	Nationality	Name	To	Date until	Ref.
19 July 2019	CF	(Northern Ireland)	Paul Smyth	Wycombe Wanderers	30 June 2020	
22 July 2019	DF	(United States)	Giles Phillips	Wycombe Wanderers	30 June 2020	
26 July 2019	GK	(Switzerland)	Seny Dieng	Doncaster Rovers	4 January 2020	
13 August 2019	GK	(Poland)	Marcin Brzozowski	Yeovil Town	September 2019	
20 August 2019	DF	(Finland)	Niko Hämäläinen	(Scotland) Kilmarnock	30 June 2020	
24 August 2019	CB	(England)	Charlie Rowan	Barnet	1 January 2020	
1 September 2019	GK	(England)	Tyla Dickinson	Hendon	Work experience	
2 September 2019	CF	(England)	Aramide Oteh	Bradford City	31 January 2020	
2 September 2019	DF	(Sierra Leone)	Osman Kakay	(Scotland) Partick Thistle	January 2020	
27 September 2019	RW	(Nigeria)	Odysseus Alfa	Billericay Town	December 2019	
4 October 2019	GK	(England)	Tyla Dickinson	Waltham Abbey	Work experience	
12 October 2019	CB	(Greece)	Themis Kefalas	Billericay Town	December 2019	
25 October 2019	DF	(England)	Kai Woollard-Innocent	Stratford Town	November 2019	
22 November 2019	DF	(England)	Aaron Drewe	Chelmsford City	22 December 2019	
28 November 2019	LW	(England)	Lewis Walker	Aldershot Town	25 April 2020	
29 November 2019	MF	(England)	Amrit Bansal-McNulty	Torquay United	January 2020	
13 December 2019	CB	(England)	Ben Wells	Concord Rangers	14 March 2020	
20 December 2019	GK	(Poland)	Marcin Brzozowki	Braintree Town	18 January 2020	
16 January 2020	RW	(Nigeria)	Odysseus Alfa	Maidenhead United	February 2020	
30 January 2020	CB	(Germany)	Toni Leistner	(Germany) 1. FC Koln	30 June 2020	
31 January 2020	LB	(England)	Franklin Domi	Eastbourne Borough	29 February 2020	
31 January 2020	CM	(England)	Dylan Duncan	(Scotland) Dunfermline Athletic	30 June 2020	
1 February 2020	MF	(England)	Amrit Bansal-McNulty	Dartford	29 February 2020	
13 February 2020	LM	(England)	Deshane Dalling	(Republic of Ireland) Cork City	10 June 2020	
29 February 2020	GK	(England)	Tyla Dickinson	Northwood	April 2020	

=== Transfers out ===
Date from	Position	Nationality	Name	To	Fee	Ref.
1 July 2019	CB	(England)	Alex Baptiste	Doncaster Rovers	Free	
1 July 2019	LB	(England)	Jake Bidwell	(Wales) Swansea City	Free	
1 July 2019	CM	(England)	Jordan Cousins	Stoke City	Free	
1 July 2019	RB	(England)	Joe Felix	Woking	Free	
1 July 2019	CB	(England)	Charlie Fox	Free agent	Released	
1 July 2019	GK	(England)	Matt Ingram	Hull City	Undisclosed	
1 July 2019	CB	(Wales)	Joel Lynch	Sunderland	Free	
1 July 2019	CB	(Grenada)	Kraig Noel-McLeod	Hendon	Released	
1 July 2019	CB	(England)	Ali Omar	Free agent	Released	
1 July 2019	CF	(England)	Matt Smith	Millwall	Undisclosed	
1 July 2019	RW	(England)	Chay Tilt	Stourbridge	Released	
1 July 2019	RW	(Poland)	Paweł Wszołek	(Poland) Legia Warsaw	Free	
3 July 2019	AM	(England)	Luke Freeman	Sheffield United	Undisclosed	
23 July 2019	RB	(England)	Darnell Furlong	West Bromwich Albion	Undisclosed	
30 July 2019	RW	(England)	David Wheeler	Wycombe Wanderers	Free	
8 August 2019	CM	(Australia)	Massimo Luongo	Sheffield Wednesday	Undisclosed	
16 August 2019	CM	(England)	Sean Goss	Shrewsbury Town	Undisclosed	
27 January 2020	CM	(England)	Josh Scowen	Sunderland	Undisclosed	
13 June 2020	LW	(England)	Marc Pugh	Free agent	Released	
19 June 2020	CB	(England)	Grant Hall	Free agent	Released	

== Friendlies ==
For the 2019/20 season, QPR have announced pre-season friendlies against Austria Vienna, Boreham Wood, Oxford United and Watford.

Win Draw Loss

12 July 2019 Friendly	Austria Vienna	3–1	Queens Park Rangers	Vienna
19:00 CEST	Barbet 24' (o.g.); Edomwonyi 50'; Yatéké 64'	Report	Scowen 45'	Stadium: Generali Arena

16 July 2019 Friendly	Boreham Wood	2–1	Queens Park Rangers	Borehamwood
19:30 BST	Tshimanga 11'; Sorba 47'	Report	Eze 7' (pen.)	Stadium: Meadow Park

20 July 2019 Friendly	Oxford United	1–2	Queens Park Rangers	Oxford
15:00 BST	Rodriguez 39'	Report	Amos 31' 33'	Stadium: Kassam Stadium; Attendance: 3,165

27 July 2019 Friendly	Queens Park Rangers	0–1	Watford	Shepherd's Bush, London
15:00 BST		Report	Capoue 31'	Stadium: Loftus Road

== Competitions ==
=== Overview ===
Competition	Record							
Competition	G	W	D	L	GF	GA	GD	Win %
Championship	46	16	10	20	67	76	−9	34.78
FA Cup	2	1	0	1	6	3	+3	50.00
League Cup	2	0	1	1	3	5	−2	0.00
Total	50	17	11	22	76	83	−7	34.00

Updated to match played 22 July 2020
Source: Competitions

=== League table ===
Pos	Team	Pld	W	D	L	GF	GA	GD	Pts
10	Derby County	46	17	13	16	62	64	−2	64
11	Blackburn Rovers	46	17	12	17	66	63	+3	63
12	Bristol City	46	17	12	17	60	65	−5	63
13	Queens Park Rangers	46	16	10	20	67	76	−9	58
14	Reading	46	15	11	20	59	58	+1	56
15	Stoke City	46	16	8	22	62	68	−6	56
16	Sheffield Wednesday	46	15	11	20	58	66	−8	56

Source: EFL Official Website
Rules for classification: 1) Points; 2) Goal difference; 3) Number of goals scored; 4) Head-to-head results; 5) Wins; 6) Away goals; 7) Penalty points (sec 9.5); 8) 12-point sending off offences

==== Result summary ====
Overall								Home						Away					
Pld	W	D	L	GF	GA	GD	Pts	W	D	L	GF	GA	GD	W	D	L	GF	GA	GD
46	16	10	20	67	76	−9	58	9	5	9	42	42	0	7	5	11	25	34	−9

Last updated: 22 July 2020.

==== Results by matchday ====
Matchday	1	2	3	4	5	6	7	8	9	10	11	12	13	14	15	16	17	18	19	20	21	22	23	24	25	26	27	28	29	30	31	32	33	34	35	36	37	38	39	40	41	42	43	44	45	46
Ground	A	H	A	H	H	A	H	A	H	A	H	A	H	H	A	H	A	H	A	H	A	A	H	A	H	H	A	H	A	H	A	A	H	A	H	H	A	H	A	H	A	A	H	A	H	A
Result	W	D	L	L	W	W	W	W	L	L	W	W	D	L	L	D	L	L	D	W	W	L	D	L	L	W	L	W	L	L	L	D	W	D	W	D	W	L	L	L	W	L	L	D	W	D
Position	4	4	13	19	12	8	7	5	9	11	9	5	5	8	9	10	12	16	16	14	12	13	14	14	15	15	16	14	14	16	17	17	16	15	12	14	13	13	14	15	13	14	16	16	13	13

Updated to match(es) played on 22 July 2020. Source: BBC Sport
A = Away; H = Home; W = Win; D = Draw; L = Loss

==== Matches ====
The fixtures for the 2019–20 season were announced on 20 June 2019.

Win Draw Loss Upcoming

===== August =====
3 August 2019 1	Stoke City	1–2	Queens Park Rangers	Stoke-on-Trent
15:00 BST	McClean (yellow card) 39'; Clucas 78'	Report	Hugill 8'; Cameron (yellow card) 16'; Scowen (yellow card) 22'; Barbet (yellow card) 24'; Eze 53'	Stadium: Britannia Stadium; Attendance: 24,004; Referee: Darren Bond

10 August 2019 2	Queens Park Rangers	1–1	Huddersfield Town	Shepherd's Bush, London
15:00 BST	Barbet (yellow card) 48'; Hall 83'; Osayi-Samuel (yellow card) 90+4'	Report	Diakhaby (yellow card) 2'; Bacuna (yellow card) 43'; Grant 49' (pen.) (yellow card) 90+2'; O'Brien (yellow card) 69'; Quaner (yellow card) 79'	Stadium: Loftus Road; Attendance: 14,377; Referee: Dean Whitestone

17 August 2019 3	Bristol City	2–0	Queens Park Rangers	Bristol
15:00 BST	Nagy 35'; Hunt (yellow card) 55'; Afobe 59'; Weimann (yellow card) 79'	Report	Rangel (yellow card) 34'; Osayi-Samuel (yellow card) 45+3'	Stadium: Ashton Gate Stadium; Attendance: 21,654; Referee: Robert Jones

21 August 2019 4	Queens Park Rangers	1–3	Swansea City	Shepherd's Bush, London
19:45 BST	Osayi-Samuel (yellow card) 62'; Hugill 66', (yellow card) 90+2'	Report	Celina 29'; Rodon (yellow card) 41'; Fulton (yellow card) 55'; Bastón 70' (pen.); Woodman (yellow card) 75'; Surridge 80'	Stadium: Loftus Road; Attendance: 12,287; Referee: Paul Tierney

24 August 2019 5	Queens Park Rangers	3–1	Wigan Athletic	Shepherd's Bush, London
15:00 BST	Chair (yellow card) 45+2'; Wells 48'; Eze 61'; Hall (yellow card) 78'; Hugill 81'	Report	Kipré 2', (yellow card) 65'; Dunkley (yellow card) 58'; Robinson (yellow card) 76'; Garner (yellow card) 78'	Stadium: Loftus Road; Attendance: 11,921; Referee: Matt Donohue

31 August 2019 6	Sheffield Wednesday	1–2	Queens Park Rangers	Owlerton
15:00 BST	Börner (yellow card) 21'; Fletcher 23' (pen.); Bannan (yellow card) 26'; Forestieri (yellow card) 45+3'; Iorfa (yellow card) 90+4'	Report	Hugill (yellow card) 26' (goal) 60', 64'; Rangel (yellow card) 43'; Leisnter (yellow card) 90+6'	Stadium: Hillsborough Stadium; Attendance: 23,446; Referee: John Brooks

===== September =====
14 September 2019 7	Queens Park Rangers	3–2	Luton Town	Shepherd's Bush, London
15:00 BST	Eze 3'; Wells 20', 28'; Kane (yellow card) 47'; Hall (yellow card) 90+2'	Report	Cornick 36'; Collins 48'; Shinnie (yellow card) 65'	Stadium: Loftus Road; Attendance: 16,186; Referee: Jeremy Simpson

21 September 2019 8	Millwall	1–2	Queens Park Rangers	Bermondsey
15:00 BST	Thompson (yellow card) 47'; Hutchinson 71' (yellow card) 85'	Report	Cameron (yellow card) 33'; Hugill (yellow card) 51'; Wells 56', 72' (yellow card) 73'	Stadium: The Den; Attendance: 16,808; Referee: Peter Bankes

28 September 2019 9	Queens Park Rangers	0–2	West Bromwich Albion	Shepherd's Bush, London
12:30 BST	Barbet (yellow card) 34' (red card) 82'; Cameron (yellow card) 22'	Report	Ferguson 53'; Pereira 84'; Furlong (yellow card) 16'	Stadium: Loftus Road; Attendance: 13,959; Referee: Geoff Eltringham
Note: Live on Sky Sports

===== October =====
2 October 2019 10	Cardiff City	3–0	Queens Park Rangers	Cardiff
19:45 BST	Morrison 11'; Pack 45+1'; Paterson 72' (yellow card) 84'; Whyte (yellow card) 87'	Report	Manning (yellow card) 84'	Stadium: Cardiff City Stadium; Attendance: 21,387; Referee: Matt Donohue

5 October 2019 11	Queens Park Rangers	4–2	Blackburn Rovers	Shepherd's Bush, London
15:00 BST	Wells 30'; Eze 49'; Barbet (yellow card) 56'; Osayi-Samuel 60'; Cameron (yellow card) 65'; Hugill 77' (yellow card) 90+2'; Manning (yellow card) 90+1'	Report	Evans (yellow card) 6'; Lenihan (yellow card) 45+1'; Dack 57' (pen.); Bell (yellow card) 58'; Armstrong 86'; Williams (yellow card) 90+2'	Stadium: Loftus Road; Attendance: 13,560; Referee: Simon Hooper

19 October 2019 12	Hull City	2–3	Queens Park Rangers	Kingston upon Hull
15:00 BST	Bowen 29'; Magennis 90+6'; Bowler (yellow card) 90+10'	Report	Manning 44'; Eze 78' (pen.) 88' (pen.)	Stadium: KCOM Stadium; Attendance: 10,285; Referee: Tony Harrington

22 October 2019 13	Queens Park Rangers	2–2	Reading	Shepherd's Bush, London
19:45 BST	Wells 29'; Hugill 58' (yellow card) 90+1'; Eze (yellow card) 90+5'	Report	Pușcaș 31'; Rinomhota (yellow card) 56'; Baldock 74'; Miazga (yellow card) 90+1'	Stadium: Loftus Road; Attendance: 12,330; Referee: Jeremy Simpson

28 October 2019 14	Queens Park Rangers	1–3	Brentford	Shepherd's Bush, London
19:45 GMT	Hall 48'	Report	Watkins 23', 90+4'; Nørgaard (yellow card) 46'; Henry (yellow card) 57'; Benrahma 60' (pen.)	Stadium: Loftus Road; Attendance: 15,562; Referee: Andy Woolmer

===== November =====
2 November 2019 15	Leeds United	2–0	Queens Park Rangers	Leeds
15:00 GMT	Klich (yellow card) 22'; Roberts 39'; Harrison 82'	Report	Ball (yellow card) 70'; Wallace (yellow card) 79'; Rangel (yellow card) 90+2'; Hugill (yellow card) 90+5'	Stadium: Elland Road; Attendance: 35,284; Referee: Geoff Eltringham

9 November 2019 16	Queens Park Rangers	2–2	Middlesbrough	Shepherd's Bush, London
15:00 GMT	Wells 25' (yellow card) 45+2'; Howson 44' (o.g.); Hall (yellow card) 53'; Ball (yellow card) 83'; Cameron (yellow card) 89'	Report	Assombalonga 23', 69'; Fry (yellow card) 90+2'; Randolph (yellow card) 90+4'	Stadium: Loftus Road; Attendance: 14,404; Referee: David Coote

22 November 2019 17	Fulham	2–1	Queens Park Rangers	Fulham
19:45 GMT	Kamara 27', 64'; Bryan (yellow card) 61'	Report	Hugill 3'	Stadium: Craven Cottage; Attendance: 18,320; Referee: James Linington

27 November 2019 18	Queens Park Rangers	0–4	Nottingham Forest	Shepherd's Bush, London
19:45 GMT	Wallace (red card) 50'; Scowen (yellow card) 57'	Report	Figueiredo 15'; Cash (yellow card) 52'; Bostock (yellow card) 76'; Grabban 81'; Carvalho 88'; Semedo 90+1'	Stadium: Loftus Road; Attendance: 12,937; Referee: Steve Martin

30 November 2019 19	Derby County	1–1	Queens Park Rangers	Derby
15:00 GMT	Malone (yellow card) 16'; Waghorn 23'	Report	Eze 45+4' (pen.); Osayi-Samuel (yellow card) 49'; Cameron (yellow card) 75'; Manning (yellow card) 88'	Stadium: Pride Park Stadium; Attendance: 26,289; Referee: David Webb

===== December =====
7 December 2019 20	Queens Park Rangers	2–0	Preston North End	Shepherd's Bush, London
15:00 GMT	Eze 17', 67' (pen.); Scowen (yellow card) 79'; Osayi-Samuel (yellow card) 90'	Report	Rudd (yellow card) 66'; Bodin (yellow card) 90+2'	Stadium: Loftus Road; Attendance: 12,179; Referee: Andy Davies

11 December 2019 21	Birmingham City	0–2	Queens Park Rangers	Birmingham
19:45 GMT	Colin (yellow card) 51'; Maghoma (yellow card) 77'	Report	Hall 45+1'; Leistner (yellow card) 61'; Osayi-Samuel 67'; Eze (yellow card) 90+1'	Stadium: St Andrew's; Attendance: 18,161; Referee: Darren Bond

14 December 2019 22	Barnsley	5–3	Queens Park Rangers	Barnsley
15:00 GMT	Chaplin 7', 18', 52'; Woodrow 60'; Thomas (yellow card) 68'; Brown (yellow card) 81'; Diaby 82'; Dougall (yellow card) 84'; Mowatt (yellow card) 85'	Report	Amos 12', 54'; Chair (yellow card) 81' (goal) 90+4'; Wells (yellow card) 85'; Hall (yellow card) 89'	Stadium: Oakwell; Attendance: 12,212; Referee: Keith Stroud

21 December 2019 23	Queens Park Rangers	2–2	Charlton Athletic	Shepherd's Bush, London
15:00 GMT	Cameron 6'; Manning (yellow card) 53'; Amos (yellow card) 55'; Pugh 70'; Hugill (yellow card) 81'	Report	Purrington (yellow card) 11'; Pratley (yellow card) 17'; Morgan (yellow card) 53'; Taylor 56'; Matthews (yellow card) 89'; Sarr 90+5'	Stadium: Loftus Road; Attendance: 16,166; Referee: Matt Donohue

26 December 2019 24	Reading	1–0	Queens Park Rangers	Reading
19:30 GMT	Swift 52'; Gunter (yellow card) 74'	Report		Stadium: Madejski Stadium; Attendance: 12,495; Referee: James Linington

29 December 2019 25	Queens Park Rangers	1–2	Hull City	Shepherd's Bush, London
15:00 GMT	Chair 20'	Report	Honeyman 32' (yellow card) 75' de Wijs (yellow card) 64'; Irvine 89'	Stadium: Loftus Road; Attendance: 13,814; Referee: Gavin Ward

===== January =====
1 January 2020 26	Queens Park Rangers	6–1	Cardiff City	Shepherd's Bush, London
15:00 GMT	Wells 9', 48', 64'; Osayi-Samuel 27', 41'; Leistner (yellow card) 39'; Eze 57'; Amos (yellow card) 86'	Report	Tomlin (yellow card) 32'; Vaulks 90+1'	Stadium: Loftus Road; Attendance: 12,355; Referee: Darren England

11 January 2020 27	Brentford	3–1	Queens Park Rangers	Brentford
12:30 GMT	Benrahma 19'; Mbeumo 23'; Watkins 33'	Report	Hall (yellow card) 46'; Kane (yellow card) 56'; Wells 62'; Cameron (yellow card) 71'; Osayi-Samuel (yellow card) 90'; Manning (yellow card) 90+2'	Stadium: Griffin Park; Attendance: 12,324; Referee: John Brooks

18 January 2020 28	Queens Park Rangers	1–0	Leeds United	Shepherd's Bush, London
12:30 GMT	Wells 20' (yellow card) 36'; Masterson (yellow card) 71'; Wallace (yellow card) 79'; Cameron (yellow card) 90'	Report	Dallas (yellow card) 42'; Bamford (penalty missed) 62'; Hernández (yellow card) 74'; Phillips (red card) 88'; Ayling (yellow card) 90'	Stadium: Loftus Road; Attendance: 16,049; Referee: Peter Bankes

25 January 2020	Blackburn Rovers	P–P	Queens Park Rangers	Blackburn
15:00 GMT		Report		Stadium: Ewood Park
Note: Fixture was postponed due to QPR's FA Cup progression.

28 January 2020 29	Blackburn Rovers	2–1	Queens Park Rangers	Blackburn
19:45 GMT	Armstrong 10'; Lenihan 30' (yellow card) 74'	Report	Hugill 22'; Chair (yellow card) 57'; Cameron (yellow card) 58'; Amos (yellow card) 62'	Stadium: Ewood Park; Attendance: 11,505; Referee: Darren Bond

===== February =====
1 February 2020 30	Queens Park Rangers	0–1	Bristol City	Shepherd's Bush, London
15:00 GMT		Report	Diédhiou 16'	Stadium: Loftus Road; Attendance: 13,713; Referee: Dean Whitestone

8 February 2020 31	Huddersfield Town	2–0	Queens Park Rangers	Huddersfield
15:00 GMT	Kachunga 57'; Mounie 61' (pen.)	Report	Hugill (yellow card) 27'; Amos (yellow card) 41'; Ball (yellow card) 82'	Stadium: John Smith's Stadium; Attendance: 21,083; Referee: David Webb

11 February 2020 32	Swansea City	0–0	Queens Park Rangers	Swansea
19:45 GMT	Naughton (yellow card) 90'	Report	Rangel (yellow card) 41'; Osayi-Samuel (yellow card) 56'	Stadium: Liberty Stadium; Attendance: 14,778; Referee: Andy Woolmer

15 February 2020 33	Queens Park Rangers	4–2	Stoke City	Shepherd's Bush, London
15:00 GMT	Osayi-Samuel (yellow card) 24' (goal) 71'; Hugill 34'; Eze 38'; Cameron (yellow card) 41'; Manning (yellow card) 80'; Rangel (yellow card) 88'; Chair 90+1'	Report	Clucas 27' (yellow card) 55'; Campbell 31'; Smith (yellow card) 74'	Stadium: Loftus Road; Attendance: 13,125; Referee: Oliver Langford

22 February 2020 34	Nottingham Forest	0–0	Queens Park Rangers	West Bridgford
15:00 GMT	Diakhaby (yellow card) 54'	Report	Rangel (yellow card) 63'; Hugill (yellow card) 76'; Osayi-Samuel (yellow card) 90'	Stadium: City Ground; Attendance: 28,750; Referee: Robert Jones

25 February 2020 35	Queens Park Rangers	2–1	Derby County	Shepherd's Bush, London
19:45 GMT	Hall 34'; Kane (yellow card) 51'; Chair 75'; Barbet (yellow card) 80'; Eze (yellow card) 90+5'	Report	Waghorn 43' (yellow card) 52'	Stadium: Loftus Road; Attendance: 11,669; Referee: Keith Stroud

29 February 2020 36	Queens Park Rangers	2–2	Birmingham City	Shepherd's Bush, London
15:00 GMT	Pugh 51'; Hugill 55'	Report	Hogan 24', 81'	Stadium: Loftus Road; Attendance: 14,113; Referee: James Linington

===== March =====
7 March 2020 37	Preston North End	1–3	Queens Park Rangers	Preston, Lancashire
15:00 GMT	Johnson 19' (pen.); Gallagher (yellow card) 44'; Davies (yellow card) 61'	Report	Cameron (yellow card) 56' (yellow-red card) 67'; Hall 61'; Manning 78'; Amos (yellow card) 83'; Eze 84'	Stadium: Deepdale; Attendance: 12,378; Referee: Dean Whitestone

14 March 2020 38	Queens Park Rangers	P–P	Barnsley	Shepherd's Bush, London
15:00 GMT				Stadium: Loftus Road
Note: The match was postponed on 13 March 2020 due to the COVID-19 pandemic.

17 March 2020 39	Charlton Athletic	P–P	Queens Park Rangers	Charlton
19:45 GMT				Stadium: The Valley
Note: The match was postponed on 13 March 2020 due to the COVID-19 pandemic.

21 March 2020 40	Queens Park Rangers	P–P	Fulham	Shepherd's Bush, London
15:00 GMT				Stadium: Loftus Road
Note: The match was postponed on 13 March 2020 due to the COVID-19 pandemic.

===== April =====
4 April 2020 41	Middlesbrough	P–P	Queens Park Rangers	Middlesbrough
15:00 BST				Stadium: Riverside Stadium
Note: The match was postponed on 19 March 2020 due to the COVID-19 pandemic.

10 April 2020 42	Wigan Athletic	P–P	Queens Park Rangers	Wigan
15:00 BST				Stadium: DW Stadium
Note: The match was postponed on 19 March 2020 due to the COVID-19 pandemic.

13 April 2020 43	Queens Park Rangers	P–P	Sheffield Wednesday	Shepherd's Bush, London
15:00 BST				Stadium: Loftus Road
Note: The match was postponed on 19 March 2020 due to the COVID-19 pandemic.

18 April 2020 44	Luton Town	P–P	Queens Park Rangers	Luton
15:00 BST				Stadium: Kenilworth Road
Note: The match was postponed on 19 March 2020 due to the COVID-19 pandemic.

25 April 2020 45	Queens Park Rangers	P–P	Millwall	Shepherd's Bush, London
15:00 BST				Stadium: Loftus Road
Note: The match was postponed on 19 March 2020 due to the COVID-19 pandemic.

===== May =====
2 May 2020 46	West Bromwich Albion	P–P	Queens Park Rangers	West Bromwich
12:30 BST				Stadium: The Hawthorns
Note: The match was postponed on 3 April 2020 due to the COVID-19 pandemic.

===== June =====
20 June 2020 38	Queens Park Rangers	0–1	Barnsley	Shepherd's Bush, London
15:00 BST		Report	Simoes 7'; Chaplin (yellow card) 90+2'	Stadium: Loftus Road; Referee: Andy Davies

27 June 2020 39	Charlton Athletic	1–0	Queens Park Rangers	Charlton
12:30 BST	Pratley 12', (yellow card) 76'	Report		Stadium: The Valley; Referee: Tim Robinson

30 June 2020 40	Queens Park Rangers	1–2	Fulham	Shepherd's Bush, London
18:30 BST	Hugill 1', (yellow card) 45+1'; Kakay (yellow card) 23'	Report	Arter 21'; Christie (yellow card) 32', (goal) 75'; Cairney (yellow card) 53'; Knockaert (yellow card) 64'	Stadium: Loftus Road; Referee: Gavin Ward

===== July =====
5 July 2020 41	Middlesbrough	0–1	Queens Park Rangers	Middlesbrough
14:00 BST	Johnson (yellow card) 38'; Saville (yellow card) 51'; Assombalonga (yellow card) 89'	Report	Hugill 32'	Stadium: Riverside Stadium; Referee: Scott Duncan

8 July 2020 42	Wigan Athletic	1–0	Queens Park Rangers	Wigan
18:00 BST	Moore 33'; Williams (yellow card) 63'	Report		Stadium: DW Stadium; Referee: Geoff Eltringham

11 July 2020 43	Queens Park Rangers	0–3	Sheffield Wednesday	Shepherd's Bush, London
15:00 BST	Ball (yellow card) 35'	Report	Iorfa 5'; Hunt (yellow card) 30'; Windass 45+2'; Odubajo (yellow card) 57'; Murphy 78'	Stadium: Loftus Road; Referee: Oliver Langford

14 July 2020 44	Luton Town	1–1	Queens Park Rangers	Luton
19:45 BST	Collins 20' (pen.); Mpanzu (yellow card) 58'	Report	Ball 65'	Stadium: Kenilworth Road; Referee: Stephen Martin

18 July 2020 45	Queens Park Rangers	4–3	Millwall	Shepherd's Bush, London
15:00 BST	Masterson 43'; Manning 52'; Eze 62'; Kane 73'	Report	Cooper (yellow card) 20'; Smith 49'; Hutchinson 67'; Molumby 90+5'	Stadium: Loftus Road; Referee: James Linington

22 July 2020 46	West Bromwich Albion	2–2	Queens Park Rangers	West Bromwich
19:30 BST	Diangana 44'; Robinson 49'	Report	Manning 34'; Eze 61'	Stadium: The Hawthorns; Referee: Darren England

=== Emirates FA Cup ===
The second round draw was made live on BBC Two from Etihad Stadium, Micah Richards and Tony Adams conducted the draw. The fourth round draw was made by Alex Scott and David O'Leary on Monday, 6 January.

Win Draw Loss

5 January 2020 Third round	Queens Park Rangers	5–1	Swansea City (Championship)	Shepherd's Bush
14:01 GMT	Hugill 21', 45'; Osayi-Samuel 29'; Wallace 76'; Scowen 90+1'	Report	Byers 60'; Fulton (yellow card) 64'	Stadium: Kiyan Prince Foundation Stadium; Attendance: 6,712; Referee: Steve Martin

24 January 2020 Fourth round	Queens Park Rangers	1–2	Sheffield Wednesday (Championship)	Shepherd's Bush
20:00 GMT	Ball (yellow card) 60'; Osayi-Samuel (yellow card) 86'; Wells 90+3'	Report	Fox 43'; Winnall 90+1'	Stadium: Kiyan Prince Foundation Stadium; Attendance: 11,871; Referee: Keith Stroud

=== Carabao Cup ===
The first round draw was made on 20 June. The second round draw was made on 13 August 2019 following the conclusion of all but one first-round matches.

Win Draw Loss

13 August 2019 First round	Queens Park Rangers	3–3 (5–4 p)	Bristol City (Championship)	Shepherd's Bush
19:45 BST	Wells 13'; Chair 26'; Manning 86' (pen.); Ball (yellow card) 90+2'	Report	Diédhiou 13'; Hunt 41'; Walsh 59'	Stadium: Loftus Road; Attendance: 5,795; Referee: Andy Davies
	Penalties
	Manning (penalty scored); Mlakar (penalty scored); Wells (penalty scored); Smith (penalty missed); Barbet (penalty missed); Chair (penalty scored); Amos (penalty scored)		(penalty missed) Diédhiou; (penalty scored) Walsh; (penalty scored) O'Dowda; (penalty missed) Eliasson; (penalty scored) Moore; (penalty scored) Rowe; (penalty missed) Wright

28 August 2019 Second round	Queens Park Rangers	0–2	Portsmouth (League One)	Shepherd's Bush
19:45 BST	Manning (yellow card) 40'; Wells (yellow card) 64'; Kelly (yellow card) 77'; Kane (yellow card) 90+5'	Report	Marquis 77' (pen.); Harness 81'; Cannon (yellow card) 90+4'	Stadium: Loftus Road; Attendance: 7,783; Referee: Ross Joyce

== Squad statistics ==
=== Statistics ===
As of 22 July 2020

No.	Pos	Nat	Player	Total		Sky Bet Championship		Carabao Cup		Emirates FA Cup	
No.	Pos	Nat	Player	Apps	Goals	Apps	Goals	Apps	Goals	Apps	Goals
1	GK	(England) ENG	Joe Lumley	28	0	27	0	0	0	1	0
2	DF	(England) ENG	Todd Kane	36	1	21+11	1	2	0	2	0
3	DF	(Scotland) SCO	Lee Wallace	12	1	10+1	0	0	0	1	1
5	DF	(United States) USA	Geoff Cameron	37	1	36	1	0	0	1	0
8	MF	(England) ENG	Luke Amos	36	2	26+8	2	0+1	0	0+1	0
9	FW	(England) ENG	Jordan Hugill	41	15	30+9	13	0	0	2	2
10	MF	(England) ENG	Eberechi Eze	47	14	45	14	0+1	0	1	0
12	MF	(England) ENG	Dominic Ball	35	1	30+1	1	1+1	0	2	0
14	DF	(Republic of Ireland) IRL	Ryan Manning	44	5	41	4	2	1	1	0
17	MF	(Republic of Ireland) IRL	Olamide Shodipo	12	0	2+9	0	0	0	0+1	0
18	FW	(England) ENG	Aramide Oteh	10	0	1+9	0	0	0	0	0
19	MF	(Morocco) MAR	Ilias Chair	45	5	26+15	4	2	1	2	0
20	MF	(Nigeria) NGR	Bright Osayi-Samuel	40	6	34+3	5	1	0	1+1	1
22	DF	(Spain) ESP	Àngel Rangel	21	0	21	0	0	0	0	0
23	DF	(Republic of Ireland) IRL	Conor Masterson	14	1	10+2	1	0	0	2	0
24	DF	(Sierra Leone) SLE	Osman Kakay	7	0	7	0	0	0	0	0
26	MF	(England) ENG	Faysal Bettache	3	0	0+3	0	0	0	0	0
27	FW	(Denmark) DEN	Marco Ramkilde	1	0	0+1	0	0	0	0	0
29	DF	(France) FRA	Yoann Barbet	29	0	27	0	2	0	0	0
30	MF	(Northern Ireland) NIR	Charlie Owens	2	0	0	0	1+1	0	0	0
32	GK	(Scotland) SCO	Liam Kelly	22	0	19	0	2	0	1	0
33	GK	(England) ENG	Dillon Barnes	0	0	0	0	0	0	0	0
40	DF	(England) ENG	Joe Gubbins	2	0	0+1	0	0	0	0+1	0
47	MF	(England) ENG	Jack Clarke	7	0	0+6	0	0	0	1	0
Out on Loan
28	DF	(Finland) FIN	Niko Hämäläinen	0	0	0	0	0	0	0	0
37	DF	(Germany) GER	Toni Leistner	25	0	20+2	0	2	0	1	0
39	MF	(England) ENG	Deshane Dalling	1	0	0	0	0	0	0+1	0
—	GK	(Switzerland) SUI	Seny Dieng	0	0	0	0	0	0	0	0
—	DF	(United States) USA	Giles Phillips	0	0	0	0	0	0	0	0
—	FW	(Northern Ireland) NIR	Paul Smyth	0	0	0	0	0	0	0	0
Left During the Season
4	DF	(England) ENG	Grant Hall	30	5	30	5	0	0	0	0
6	MF	(Wales) WAL	Matthew Smith	10	0	2+6	0	2	0	0	0
7	MF	(England) ENG	Marc Pugh	31	2	12+15	2	2	0	2	0
11	MF	(England) ENG	Josh Scowen	20	1	8+10	0	1	0	1	1
16	FW	(Slovenia) SLO	Jan Mlakar	8	0	0+6	0	1+1	0	0	0
21	FW	(Bermuda) BER	Nahki Wells	29	15	20+6	13	1+1	1	0+1	1

=== Goals ===
As of 22 July 2020

Rank	Player	Position	Championship	League Cup	FA Cup	Total
1	(England) Jordan Hugill	FW	13	0	2	15
1	(Bermuda) Nahki Wells	FW	13	1	1	15
3	(England) Eberechi Eze	MF	14	0	0	14
4	(Nigeria) Bright Osayi-Samuel	MF	5	0	1	6
5	(Morocco) Ilias Chair	MF	4	1	0	5
5	(England) Grant Hall	DF	5	0	0	5
7	(Republic of Ireland) Ryan Manning	MF	4	1	0	5
8	(England) Luke Amos	MF	2	0	0	2
8	(England) Marc Pugh	MF	2	0	0	2
10	(England) Dominic Ball	MF	1	0	0	1
10	(United States) Geoff Cameron	MF	1	0	0	1
10	(England) Todd Kane	DF	1	0	0	1
10	(Republic of Ireland) Conor Masterson	DF	1	0	0	1
10	(England) Josh Scowen	MF	0	0	1	1
10	(Scotland) Lee Wallace	DF	0	0	1	1
Own goal			1	0	0	1
Total			67	3	6	76

=== Clean sheets ===
As of 22 July 2020

Rank	Player	Position	Championship	League Cup	FA Cup	Total
1	(Scotland) Liam Kelly	GK	3	0	0	3
1	(England) Joe Lumley	GK	3	0	0	3
Total			6	0	0	6

=== Disciplinary record ===
As of 22 July 2020

No.	Pos.	Name	Championship		FA Cup		League Cup		Total	
No.	Pos.	Name	Booked	Sent off (straight red)	Booked	Sent off (straight red)	Booked	Sent off (straight red)	Booked	Sent off (straight red)
1	GK	Joe Lumley	0	0	0	0	0	0	0	0
2	DF	Todd Kane	3	0	0	0	1	0	4	0
3	DF	Lee Wallace	2	1	0	0	0	0	2	1
4	DF	Grant Hall	5	0	0	0	0	0	5	0
5	DF	Geoff Cameron	12	1	0	0	0	0	12	1
6	MF	Matthew Smith	0	0	0	0	0	0	0	0
7	MF	Marc Pugh	0	0	0	0	0	0	0	0
8	MF	Luke Amos	5	0	0	0	0	0	5	0
9	FW	Jordan Hugill	10	0	0	0	0	0	10	0
10	MF	Eberechi Eze	3	0	0	0	0	0	3	0
11	MF	Josh Scowen	3	0	0	0	0	0	3	0
12	DF	Dominic Ball	4	0	1	0	1	0	6	0
14	MF	Ryan Manning	7	0	0	0	1	0	8	0
16	FW	Jan Mlakar	0	0	0	0	0	0	0	0
17	MF	Olamide Shodipo	0	0	0	0	0	0	0	0
19	MF	Ilias Chair	3	0	0	0	0	0	3	0
20	MF	Bright Osayi-Samuel	9	0	1	0	0	0	10	0
21	FW	Nahki Wells	4	0	0	0	1	0	5	0
22	DF	Àngel Rangel	6	0	0	0	0	0	6	0
23	DF	Conor Masterson	1	0	0	0	0	0	1	0
29	DF	Yoann Barbet	5	1	0	0	0	0	5	1
30	MF	Charlie Owens	0	0	0	0	0	0	0	0
32	GK	Liam Kelly	0	0	0	0	1	0	1	0
37	DF	Toni Leistner	3	0	0	0	0	0	3	0
Total			85	3	2	0	5	0	92	3
