= Faysal Bettache =

English footballer (born 2000)

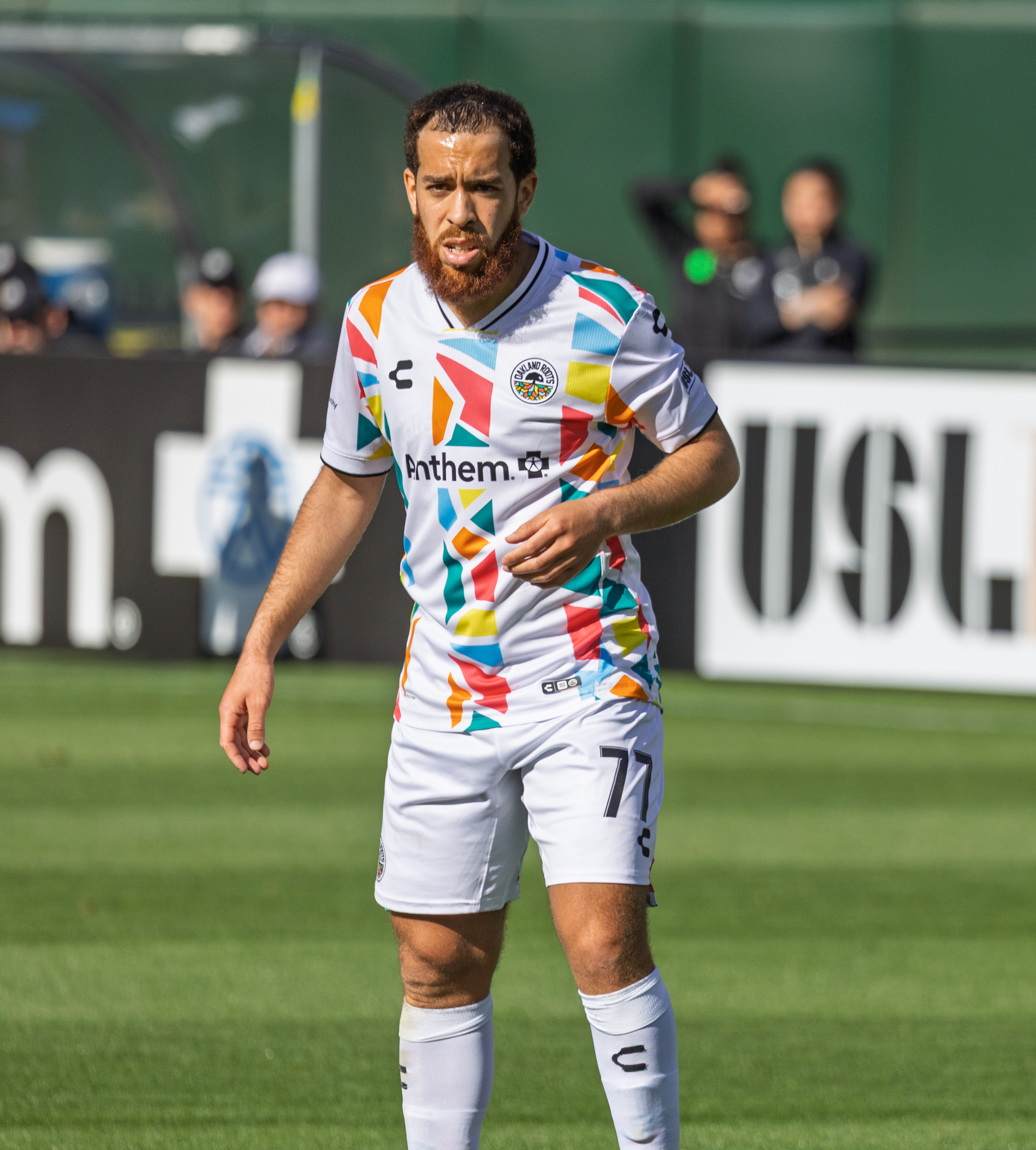
- Bettache with the Oakland Roots in 2026

Personal information
- Full name: Faysal Bettache
- Date of birth: 7 July 2000 (age 26)
- Place of birth: Westminster, London, England
- Height: 6 ft 1 in (1.85 m)
- Position: Midfielder

Team information
- Current team: Oakland Roots
- Number: 77

Youth career
- –2014: Watford
- 2014–2018: Queens Park Rangers

Senior career*
Years	Team	Apps	(Gls)
2018–2023	Queens Park Rangers	9	(0)
2019–2020	→ Billericay Town (loan)	4	(0)
2021	→ Oldham Athletic (loan)	10	(0)
2022–2023	→ Aldershot Town (loan)	7	(0)
2023	St. Louis City 2	28	(9)
2024	Tacoma Defiance	17	(7)
2024–2025	FC Tulsa	20	(0)
2025–	Oakland Roots	39	(2)
- * Club domestic league appearances and goals as of 11:00, 10 November 2026 (UTC)

Faysal Bettache (born 7 July 2000) is an English professional footballer who plays as a midfielder for Oakland Roots in the USL Championship.

== Club career ==
=== Queens Park Rangers ===
Born in Westminster, Bettache joined Queens Park Rangers from Watford in March 2014 at the age of 13.

During pre-season of the 2018–19 campaign, Bettache was noticed by manager Steve McClaren and become involved with first team affairs, after featuring heavily for the under-23 squad. On 28 August 2018, Bettache was named as a substitute in the second round of the 2018–19 EFL Cup against Bristol Rovers, he replaced Bright Osayi-Samuel in the 85th minute to make his first team and professional debut. On 25 May 2019, Bettache signed his first professional contract with QPR after completing his three-year scholarship with the academy.

On 15 November 2019, Bettache joined Billericay Town on a one-month loan. The deal was later extended until 25 January 2020.

Towards the end of the 2019–20 season, Bettache made his Championship debut against Charlton Athletic and made two further contributions before the end of the season.

On 28 October 2020, Bettache signed a new three-year contract until 2023 with an option for a further year.

Bettache joined EFL League Two club Oldham Athletic on a season-long loan on 20 August 2021. On 10 December 2021, it was announced that Bettache would be recalled by QPR when the transfer window reopened in January, having made 13 appearances in all competitions at Oldham.

On 13 September 2022, Bettache signed for National League club Aldershot Town on a three-month loan deal.

On 20 January 2023, he was released on a mutual termination of his contract

=== St. Louis City 2 ===
In March 2023, it was announced that he had joined MLS Next Pro side St. Louis City 2 on a free transfer. On September 3, 2023, he scored a hat trick against Houston Dynamo 2, became the first player to score a hat trick in the history of the club.

On 27 February 2024, Bettache joined fellow MLS Next Pro side Tacoma Defiance.

Bettache joined USL Championship side FC Tulsa in July 2024.

On 22 July 2025, Bettache made the move to USL Championship side Oakland Roots SC.

== Personal life ==
Born in England, Bettache is of Algerian descent.

== Career statistics ==
As of end of 2021–22 season

Appearances and goals by club, season and competition
Club	Season	League			FA Cup		League Cup		Other		Total	
Club	Season	Division	Apps	Goals	Apps	Goals	Apps	Goals	Apps	Goals	Apps	Goals
Queens Park Rangers	2018–19	Championship	0	0	0	0	1	0	0	0	1	0
Queens Park Rangers	2019–20	Championship	3	0	0	0	0	0	0	0	3	0
Queens Park Rangers	2020–21	Championship	6	0	1	0	2	0	0	0	9	0
Queens Park Rangers	2021–22	Championship	0	0	0	0	1	0	0	0	1	0
Queens Park Rangers	2022–23	Championship	0	0	0	0	0	0	0	0	0	0
Queens Park Rangers	Total		9	0	1	0	3	0	0	0	13	0
Billericay Town (loan)	2019–20	National League South	4	0	0	0	0	0	0	0	4	0
Oldham Athletic (loan)	2021–22	League Two	10	0	0	0	0	0	3 (Note: Appearance(s) in EFL Trophy)	0	13	0
St. Louis City 2	2023	MLS Next Pro	28	9	0	0	0	0	0	0	28	9
Career total			50	9	3	0	3	0	0	3	50	9
