= Luke Amos =

English footballer (born 1997)

Personal information
- Full name: Luke Ayodele Amos
- Date of birth: 23 February 1997 (age 29)
- Place of birth: Welwyn Garden City, England
- Height: 5 ft 10 in (1.79 m)
- Position: Defensive midfielder

Team information
- Current team: Paju Frontier
- Number: 40

Youth career
- 2002–2006: Ware Youth
- 2006–2016: Tottenham Hotspur

Senior career*
Years	Team	Apps	(Gls)
2016–2020	Tottenham Hotspur	1	(0)
2017	→ Southend United (loan)	3	(0)
2018	→ Stevenage (loan)	16	(2)
2019–2020	→ Queens Park Rangers (loan)	34	(2)
2020–2023	Queens Park Rangers	55	(6)
2024–2025	Hibernian	8	(0)
2025–2026	Perth Glory	11	(1)
2026–	Paju Frontier	13	(0)

International career
2015	England U18	2	(0)
- * Club domestic league appearances and goals as of 6 August 2026

Luke Ayodele Amos (Yoruba: [a.jɔ́.dɛ́.lɛ], /ˈeɪ.məs/; born 23 February 1997) is an English professional footballer who plays as a defensive midfielder for K League 2 club Paju Frontier.

== Early life ==
Amos was born in Welwyn Garden City, Hertfordshire and is of Nigerian descent. He grew up in Stanstead Abbotts and attended The John Warner School.

== Club career ==
=== Tottenham Hotspur ===
==== 2006–16: Youth career ====
Amos played for Ware Youth between the ages of five and nine, after which he joined Tottenham Hotspur's youth set-up. Amos initially joined Spurs as a winger and during his youth career he played in the number 10 role as well as both full-back positions before settling in the central midfield role. He signed his academy scholarship in 2013 and first professional contract in 2015.

On 16 February 2013, Amos made his under-18 debut in a 4–0 win over West Brom in the U18 Premier League replacing Harry Winks in the 73rd minute. Amos gained more experience as he was called up from the under-16s.

In January 2014, Amos was part of the Academy squad that went to Vietnam to play in the Nutifood Cup. In their first game, Spurs' Academy beat Japan under-19s 2–1 with Amos being subbed on in the final minutes. Amos did not feature in the 2–1 loss to Roma under-19s but did start in a 3–2 win over Vietnam under-19s and was substituted for Connor Ogilvie in the 59th minute.

On 5 September 2014, Amos helped secure Spurs' under-18s a place in the Under-18s Champions Cup final with a 5–1 win over Everton and a 1–1 draw with Real Madrid. A day later, they met Benfica in the final where they won 1–0.

In March 2015, Amos and Tottenham's under-18s reached the FA Youth Cup semi-final against Chelsea where they won 2–0 in the first leg but lost 5–2 in the second leg meaning the result was 5–4 on aggregate and they failed to reach the final.

On 24 May 2015, Amos and Spurs' Academy team lost to Liverpool on penalties after the game finished 1–1 in Volksbank Cup semi-final in Germany. Amos missed a penalty and the shootout finished 4–3.

In July 2015, Amos and the Spurs under-21 team took part in the National Under-21 Tournament in France. The squad finished fourth overall with a loss in the third/fourth place play-off against FC Lorient.

On 26 July 2016, Amos made his first-team debut in a 2–1 loss against Juventus in a friendly during Spurs' pre-season tour of Australia. He came on in the 79th minute to replace Dominic Ball and would later become teammates with Ball at QPR.

Amos was part of first-team squad in October 2016, as an unused substitute in the club's 2–1 defeat to Liverpool in the EFL Cup.

During the 2016–17 season, Amos started 14 games for Tottenham's under-23s in Premier League 2 with many of them as captain.

==== 2017: Southend United (loan) ====
He was loaned out to League One side Southend United on 27 January 2017, with the deal running for the remainder of the 2016–17 campaign. He spent the early months of his loan spell at Southend as an unused substitute, combining the loan deal alongside playing for the Tottenham U23 development squad. Amos made his competitive debut for Southend on 18 March 2017, a game in which he played the opening 51 minutes as Southend secured a 3–2 win over Walsall at Roots Hall. He made three appearances during the loan spell before returning to his parent club in May 2017.

==== 2017–18: Return to Tottenham Hotspur ====
In May 2017, after Tottenham Hotspur extended their partnership with AIA, Amos and other Spurs players travelled to Hong Kong where they met members of the Spurs teams from Hong Kong, Thailand, Malaysia and Australia.

On the last weekend of July 2017, Amos was part of the under-21 team that travelled to France for the European Under-21 Tournament where they faced PSG, EA Guingamp and FC Lorient in the group stage.

On 6 December 2017, Amos was named on the bench with academy graduate Kazaiah Sterling in a 3–0 win over APOEL which was Tottenham's last Champions League group game for the 2017–18 season.

For the beginning of the 2017–18 season, Amos made 15 starts across all competitions for Spurs' under-23s.

On 29 January 2018, he signed a contract extension to remain at Tottenham until 2019.

==== 2018: Stevenage (loan) ====
On the same day as the contract extension, Amos joined League Two side Stevenage on loan for the rest of the 2017–18 season. On 30 January 2018, Amos made his debut for the club coming on as a substitute for captain Ronnie Henry after a hamstring injury in a 1–0 loss against Swindon Town. On 17 February 2018, Amos scored his first goal for Stevenage from outside the box in a 4–1 win at Yeovil Town. On 17 March 2018, Amos scored his second goal for the club in 2–2 draw against in Port Vale in the 10th minute which opened the scoring.

==== 2018–19: Premier League debut ====
During Tottenham's tour of the US, Amos had an impressive pre-season with performances against the likes of AS Roma, Barcelona and AC Milan. In the game against AS Roma, Amos assisted Fernando Llorente's first goal and was substituted for George Marsh, another academy product on 83 minutes. On 11 August 2018, Amos made his Premier League debut for Spurs in their first game of the 2018–19 season at St James' Park coming on as a substitute for Eric Dier against Newcastle United which finished 2–1. On 29 August 2018, Amos signed a new contract with the club alongside Timothy Eyoma and Oliver Skipp until 2021. On 28 September 2018, Amos ruptured his anterior cruciate ligament in a Premier League 2 match against Blackburn Rovers after just 22 minutes in which he was captain. The rehabilitation required meant that Amos would not be expected to appear until the following season.

==== 2019–20: Queens Park Rangers (loan) ====
On 1 July 2019, Amos joined Championship side Queens Park Rangers on a season-long loan. On 20 July 2019, Amos scored both goals in a 2–1 win over Oxford United in a pre-season friendly which were both headed goal scored in the space of two minutes. Amos made his debut in the first game of the 2019–20 season which was a 2–1 win over Stoke where he played 63 minutes before being substituted for Marc Pugh. On 14 December 2019, Amos scored two goals in a 5–3 loss against Barnsley which were his first goals for the club. He made a total of 35 appearances for the club in this loan spell to QPR scoring twice in the process.

=== Queens Park Rangers ===
He signed permanently for Queens Park Rangers on 17 August 2020, on a three-year contract for an undisclosed fee. On 17 October 2020, Amos ruptured his anterior cruciate ligament in a 0–0 draw against Bournemouth and was ruled out for the rest of the season. Amos only made a total of 6 appearances in the 2020–21 season before his injury. On 31 October 2020, teammate Ilias Chair scored the opener in a 3–2 win over Cardiff honouring his goal to Amos by pulling up his shirt to reveal a 'Stay Strong 8' message.

Amos was released at the end of the 2022–23 season.

=== Hibernian ===
Amos was linked to signing for Reading for the 2023–24 season. After training with Tottenham's under-23 team, he went on trial with Scottish club Hibernian, signing an 18-month contract with the club in January 2024. Amos played 15 times in a year with Hibs, before he was released from his contract in February 2025.

=== Perth Glory ===
On 14 February 2025, Amos joined A-League side Perth Glory on a 6-month contract, with an option to extend for a further year. On 23 May 2025, Perth Glory announced that Amos had extended his contract with the club until the end of the 2025/26 season.

=== Paju Frontier ===
On 13 February 2026, newly promoted K League 2 side Paju Frontier announced the singing of Amos.

== International career ==
On 28 March 2015, Amos made his England under-18s debut in a 6–1 win over Switzerland where he also provided an assist. He started with Spurs teammates Josh Onomah and Kyle Walker-Peters as well. On 10 June 2015, Amos made his second appearance for England under-18s in a 2–1 loss against Russia in Moscow.

== Personal life ==
From a young age, Amos has always wanted to speak another language. He started French lessons while attending The John Warner School and by age 15, Amos achieved a GCSE A Grade in French. Amos continued to study with a French tutor throughout his scholarship at Spurs. As he got closer to the first-team at Tottenham, learning was put on hold but Amos picked the language up after sustaining a knee injury in September 2018 and again when the season the 2019–20 season was put on hold due to the COVID-19 pandemic.

== Career statistics ==
As of 13 February 2026

Appearances and goals by club, season and competition
Club	Season	League			National cup (Note: Includes FA Cup, Scottish Cup)		League cup (Note: Includes EFL Cup, Scottish League Cup)		Other		Total	
Club	Season	Division	Apps	Goals	Apps	Goals	Apps	Goals	Apps	Goals	Apps	Goals
Tottenham Hotspur U23	2017–18	—			—		—		2 (Note: Appearances in EFL Trophy)	0	2	0
Tottenham Hotspur	2016–17	Premier League	0	0	0	0	0	0	0	0	0	0
Tottenham Hotspur	2017–18	Premier League	0	0	0	0	0	0	0	0	0	0
Tottenham Hotspur	2018–19	Premier League	1	0	0	0	0	0	0	0	1	0
Tottenham Hotspur	2019–20	Premier League	0	0	0	0	0	0	0	0	0	0
Tottenham Hotspur	Total		1	0	0	0	0	0	0	0	1	0
Southend United (loan)	2016–17	League One	3	0	0	0	0	0	0	0	3	0
Stevenage (loan)	2017–18	League Two	16	2	0	0	0	0	0	0	16	2
Queens Park Rangers (loan)	2019–20	Championship	34	2	0	0	1	0	—		35	2
Queens Park Rangers	2020–21	Championship	5	0	0	0	1	0	—		6	0
Queens Park Rangers	2021–22	Championship	29	6	2	0	2	0	—		33	6
Queens Park Rangers	2022–23	Championship	21	0	0	0	0	0	—		21	0
Queens Park Rangers	Total		55	6	2	0	3	0	0	0	60	6
Hibernian	2023–24	Scottish Premiership	7	0	1	0	0	0	0	0	8	0
Hibernian	2024–25	Scottish Premiership	1	0	1	0	5	0	0	0	7	0
Hibernian	Total		8	0	2	0	5	0	0	0	15	0
Perth Glory	2024–25	A-League Men	8	1	1	0	0	0	0	0	9	1
Perth Glory	2025–26	A-League Men	3	0	0	0	0	0	0	0	3	1
Perth Glory	Total		11	1	1	0	0	0	0	0	12	1
Paju Frontier	2026	K League 2	0	0	0	0	0	0	0	0	0	0
Paju Frontier	Total		0	0	0	0	0	0	0	0	0	0
Career total			127	11	5	0	9	0	2	0	143	11
