= Deshane Dalling =

English footballer

Personal information
- Date of birth: 13 August 1998 (age 28)
- Place of birth: Lambeth, England
- Position: Midfielder

Team information
- Current team: AFC Whyteleafe

Youth career
- –2017: Staines Town
- 2017–2018: Huddersfield Town
- 2018–2020: Queens Park Rangers

Senior career*
Years	Team	Apps	(Gls)
2019–2021	Queens Park Rangers	0	(0)
2020–2021	→ Cork City (loan)	13	(2)
2021	→ Wealdstone (loan)	1	(0)
2021	Hemel Hempstead Town	2	(0)
2021	Dartford	2	(0)
2021–2023	Lewes	30	(4)
2022	→ Whitehawk (loan)	2	(0)
2024	Ramsgate	2	(0)
2024–2025	Phoenix Sports	13	(3)
2025	Rayners Lane	15	(9)
2025–	AFC Whyteleafe	0	(0)
- * Club domestic league appearances and goals as of 23:12, 12 June 2025 (UTC)

Deshane Dalling (born 13 August 1998) is an English footballer who plays as a midfielder for club AFC Whyteleafe.

== Club career ==
On 23 May 2018, Dalling signed a contract with Queens Park Rangers. Dalling made his professional debut with Queens Park Rangers in a 5-1 FA Cup win over Swansea City on 5 January 2020.

On 13 February 2020, Dalling signed for League of Ireland Premier Division side Cork City on a loan deal until June. He made his debut at home to Shelbourne in a 0–1 defeat on the opening day of the 2020 season Dalling's second game for the club ended in disaster after he was sent off following a 45th minute straight red card for a two footed lunge on Joey O'Brien, as his side lost 6–0 to Shamrock Rovers at Tallaght Stadium.

On 30 January 2021, Dalling signed for Wealdstone on a one month loan deal. He made two appearances for the club before the end of his loan.

On 17 September 2021 - after a short spell at Hemel Hempstead Town - Dalling joined Dartford.

On 11 December 2021, Dalling joined Lewes. He joined Whitehawk on a month's loan on 30 September 2022.

On 10 February 2024, Dalling joined Ramsgate.

In October 2024, Dalling joined Phoenix Sports. In February 2025, he joined Rayners Lane.

In June 2025, Dalling joined newly promoted Isthmian League South East Division side AFC Whyteleafe.

== Career statistics ==
As of end of 2024–25 season

Appearances and goals by club, season and competition
Club	Season	League			National Cup		League Cup		Other		Total	
Club	Season	Division	Apps	Goals	Apps	Goals	Apps	Goals	Apps	Goals	Apps	Goals
Queens Park Rangers	2019–20	Championship	0	0	1	0	0	0	—		1	0
Queens Park Rangers	2020–21	Championship	0	0	0	0	0	0	—		0	0
Queens Park Rangers	Queens Park Rangers total		0	0	1	0	0	0	0	0	1	0
Cork City (loan)	2020	League of Ireland Premier Division	13	2	1	0	—		0	0	14	2
Wealdstone (loan)	2020–21	National League	1	0	0	0	—		1	0	2	0
Hemel Hempstead Town	2021–22	National League South	2	0	0	0	—		0	0	2	0
Dartford	2021–22	National League South	2	0	1	0	—		1 (Note: One appearance in the London Senior Cup)	0	4	0
Lewes	2021–22	Isthmian League Premier Division	18	4	—		—		1 (Note: One appearance in the Sussex Senior Cup)	0	19	4
Lewes	2022–23	Isthmian League Premier Division	5	0	2	1	—		1 (Note: Appearance(s) in FA Trophy)	0	8	1
Lewes	2023–24	Isthmian League Premier Division	7	0	4	0	—		2	0	13	0
Lewes	Total		30	4	6	1	0	0	4	0	40	5
Whitehawk (loan)	2022–23	Isthmian League Premier Division	2	0	0	0	—		0	0	2	0
Ramsgate	2023–24	Isthmian League South East Division	2	0	—		—		0	0	2	0
Phoenix Sports	2024–25	Isthmian League South East Division	13	3	0	0	—		1 (Note: Appearance(s) in Kent Senior Cup)	0	14	3
Rayners Lane	2024–25	Isthmian League South Central Division	15	9	0	0	—		2 (Note: Appearance(s) in Middlesex Senior Cup)	0	17	9
Career total			80	18	9	1	0	0	9	0	98	19
