= Ilias Chair =

Moroccan footballer (born 1997)

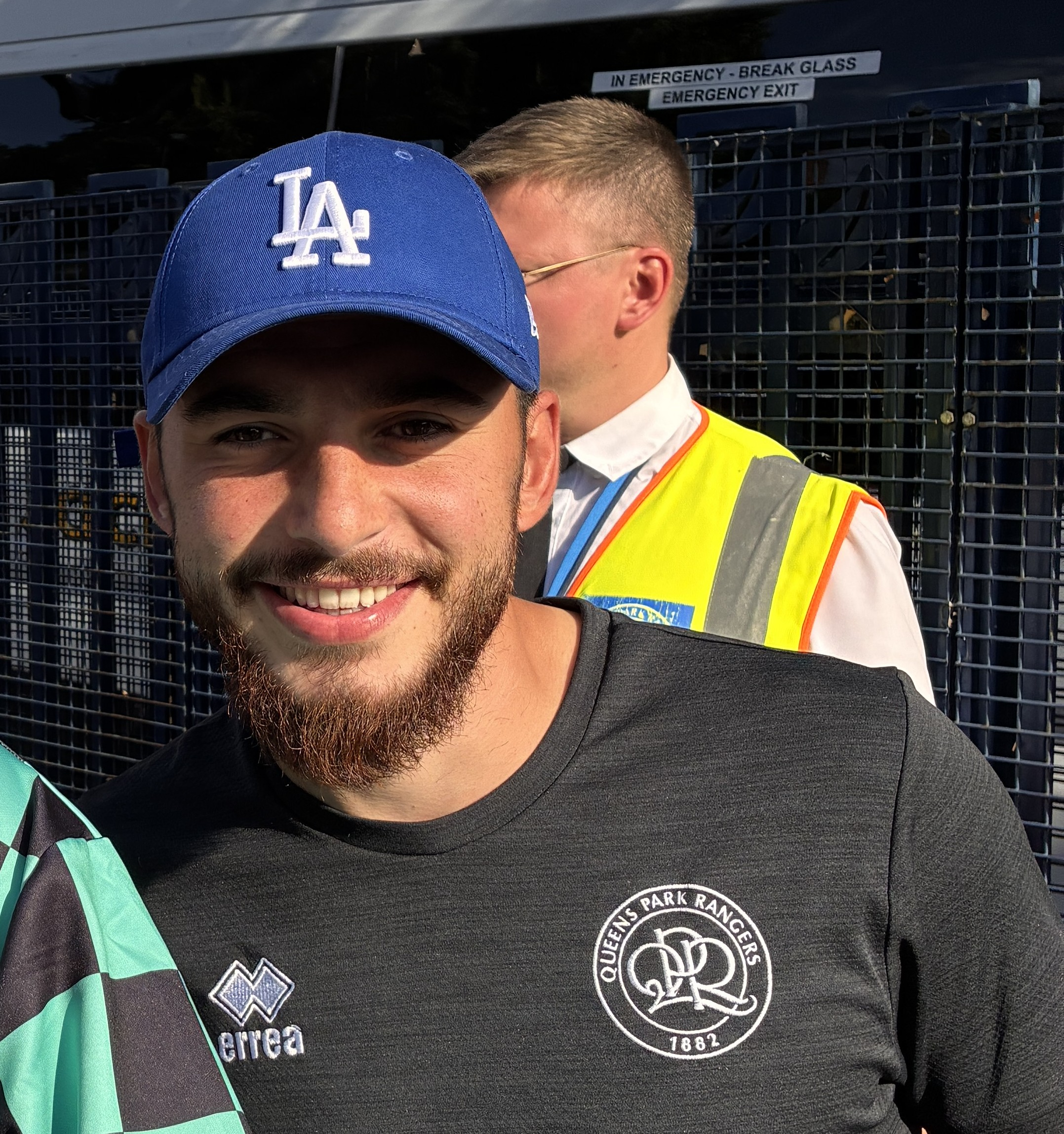
- Chair in 2026

Personal information
- Full name: Ilias Emilian Chair
- Date of birth: 30 October 1997 (age 29)
- Place of birth: Antwerp, Belgium
- Height: 1.64 m (5 ft 5 in)
- Position: Attacking midfielder

Team information
- Current team: Queens Park Rangers
- Number: 10

Youth career
- 2007–2009: Club Brugge
- 2009–2014: JMG Academy Belgium
- 2014–2015: Lierse

Senior career*
Years	Team	Apps	(Gls)
2015–2017	Lierse	2	(0)
2017–	Queens Park Rangers	261	(39)
2019	→ Stevenage (loan)	16	(6)

International career
2017	Morocco U20	5	(0)
2018	Morocco U23	1	(0)
2021–2022	Morocco	12	(1)
- * Club domestic league appearances and goals as of 01:43, 22 August 2026 (UTC)

Ilias Emilian Chair (Arabic: إلياس إميليان الشاعر; born 30 October 1997) is a professional footballer who plays as an attacking midfielder or forward for EFL Championship club Queens Park Rangers. Born in Belgium, he played for the Morocco national team.

== Early life ==
Ilias Chair was born in Antwerp in Belgium to a Moroccan father and Polish mother.

== Club career ==
=== Early career ===
Chair began his career in the youth system at Lierse. He also spent time at the academy of Club Brugge, as well as the JMG Academy Belgium. Chair made his professional debut for Lierse at the age of 17, playing in the Belgian Second Division, when he came as a 76th-minute substitute in Lierse's 1–1 away draw at Coxyde on 9 August 2015. He subsequently started his first match a month later, on 9 September 2015, playing the full 90 minutes in a 3–2 home defeat to Cercle Brugge.

=== Queens Park Rangers ===
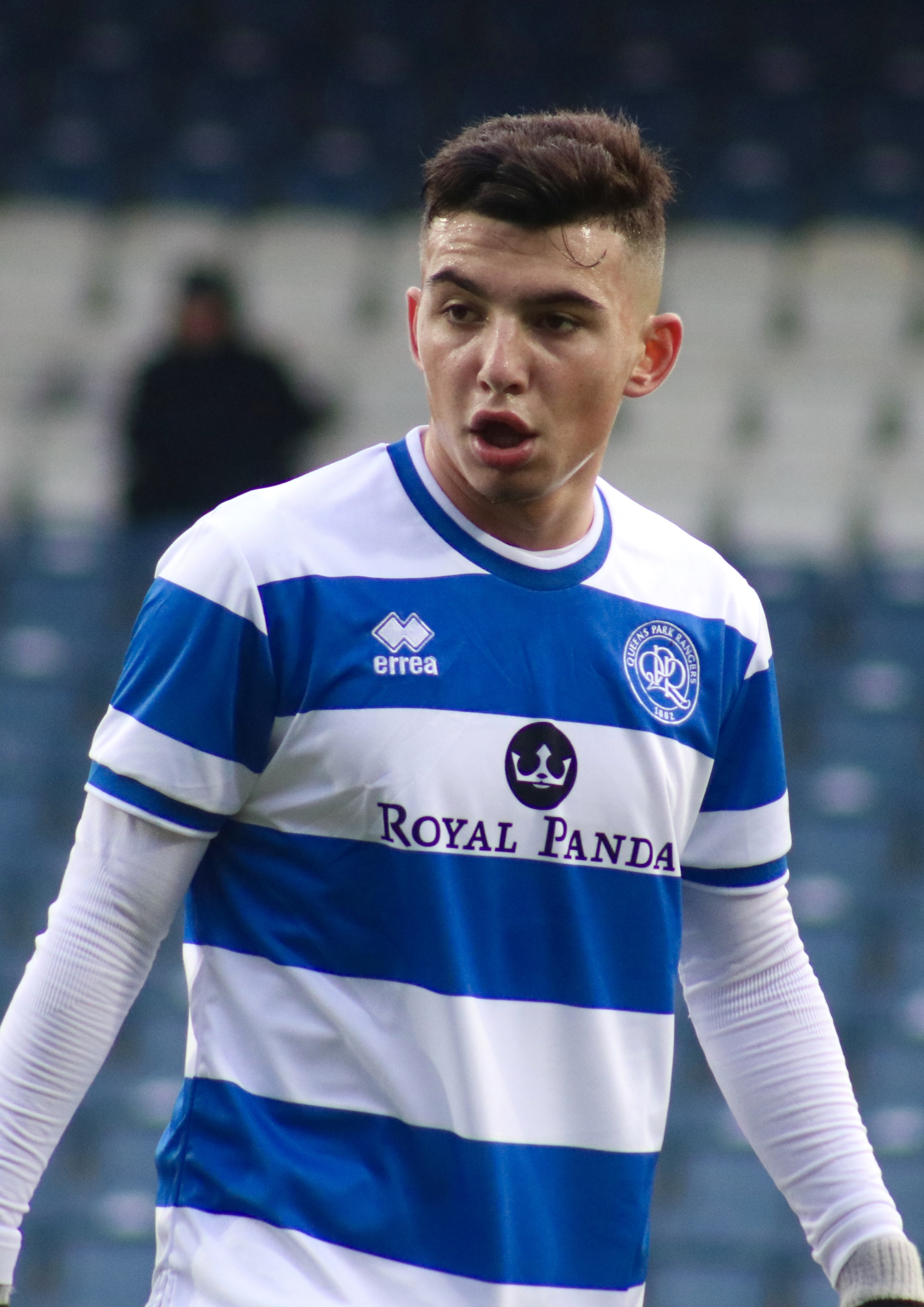
Chair with Queens Park Rangers in 2018.

Chair went on trial at Championship club QPR in January 2017. During the trial period, he scored in a 3–1 friendly win for the U23s against Bournemouth. He subsequently signed for QPR on a permanent basis on 31 January 2017. Chair was added to the club's Elite Development Squad and spent the remainder of the 2016–17 season playing for the club's U23 team.

Having impressed QPR manager Ian Holloway in training, Chair was named as a substitute in club's first round EFL Cup tie against Northampton Town at Loftus Road on 8 August 2017. He replaced Luke Freeman in the 63rd minute of the match to make his first-team debut. Chair made his first starting appearance for QPR in a 1–0 defeat against Preston North End at Deepdale on 2 December 2017. He signed a two-year contract extension with the club on 9 February 2018, keeping him at the club until the summer of 2020. He scored his first goal for the club during QPR's final home game of the 2017–18 campaign on 28 April 2018, scoring a volley at the far post as QPR overturned a one-goal deficit to win 3–1 against Birmingham City. Chair made seven first-team appearances during the season, scoring once.

Having made eight appearances for QPR during the first half of the 2018–19 season, Chair joined League Two club Stevenage on a loan deal for the remainder of the season on 31 January 2019. He made his Stevenage debut in the club's 1–0 victory over Yeovil Town at Broadhall Way on 2 February 2019, playing the full match. Chair scored his first goals for Stevenage by scoring two long-range efforts late-on in a 2–2 away draw at league leaders Lincoln City on 16 February 2019. A month later, on 12 March 2019, he scored from within his own half in Stevenage's 2–0 home win against Swindon Town. Chair was nominated for League Two Player of the Month for March 2019 having contributed four goals and four assists during the month. He made 16 appearances during the loan agreement, scoring six times and assisting six goals. Stevenage manager Dino Maamria described Chair as "the best player that has ever worn the Stevenage shirt", as well as the best player to have ever played in League Two. Maamria went on to state he feels chair had the potential to be a Premier League player, adding that it is "a shame" what has happened to him so far.

Upon his return to QPR, chair signed a new three-year contract with the club in September 2019. Under new manager Mark Warburton, he became a regular in the first team during the 2019–20 season, making 26 league starts and scoring four goals as QPR finished 13th in the Championship.

Chair continued to establish himself as one of QPR's principal attacking players during the 2020–21 season, scoring eight league goals and providing four assists in 43 appearances. On 29 January 2021, he signed a new four-and-a-half-year contract, extending his commitment to the club until 2025, with QPR holding an option to extend the deal by a further year.

Chair enjoyed another productive campaign in the 2021–22 season, scoring nine league goals and registering five assists in 37 starts. One of his most notable goals came against Blackburn Rovers in October 2021, when he scored a long-range strike that subsequently won the Championship Goal of the Month award.

During the 2022–23 season, chair scored five league goals and provided nine assists in 40 appearances as QPR finished 20th in the Championship. Despite the team's struggles, he remained one of its principal creative outlets. In April 2023, he scored an impressive opening goal in a 4–2 victory over Leeds United, cutting inside before striking towards goal as QPR moved closer to securing their Championship survival.

Chair continued to play a prominent role during the 2023–24 season, making 43 league starts and scoring seven goals, with eight assists, in 44 appearances. QPR endured another difficult campaign and finished 18th, but his attacking contribution helped the club avoid relegation. His performances included a goal in the 2–0 victory over Leeds United in April 2024, a result that proved important in QPR's survival bid.

In January 2025, chair signed a new long-term contract with QPR, reaffirming his commitment to the club after eight years in west London. However, his 2024–25 season was disrupted by injuries. A back problem during pre-season delayed his return to action, and he subsequently suffered a knee injury in October 2024. After returning to the side, he sustained a hamstring injury during a 2–1 defeat away to Middlesbrough on 11 March 2025. He made 28 league appearances, scoring twice and providing six assists, as QPR finished 15th in the Championship.

Speaking in August 2025, chair said that reaching the Premier League remained a major ambition and expressed his hope of achieving it with QPR. He also spoke of his desire to return to the Morocco national team after his injury-disrupted season. Chair had been part of Morocco's squad at the 2022 FIFA World Cup, appearing as a substitute in the third-place play-off against Croatia.

Chair suffered an injury hit campaign in the 2025–26 season making only 15 league appearances and scoring once during the season, as QPR finished 15th in the Championship in their first season under Julian Stefan.

== International career ==
Chair was born in Belgium and is Moroccan by descent. He was called up to the Morocco U20 squad for a week-long training camp in Rabat in June 2017. Chair represented the Morocco U23s in a 1–0 friendly defeat to the Senegal U23s on 23 March 2018.

He debuted with the senior Morocco national team in a friendly 1–0 win over Ghana on 9 June 2021. On 6 October 2021, in his fourth appearance for his country, chair scored his first Morocco goal with the third in a 5–0 win over Guinea-Bissau.

On 10 November 2022, chair was named in Morocco's 26-man squad for the 2022 FIFA World Cup in Qatar. On 17 December, he made his World Cup debut in the 3rd place playoff against Croatia in an eventual 2–1 loss.

== Personal life ==
On 23 February 2024, chair, along with his brother Jaber, were convicted of assaulting a truck driver by a court in Antwerp. He was found to have assaulted the truck driver with a rock, breaking his skull and leaving him unconscious. He was sentenced to 12 months in prison with a further 12 months suspended. Chair appealed the sentence, and Queens Park Rangers have stated that he would remain available for selection during the appeals process. On appeal, the charge was reduced to a misdemeanour and chair was instead sentenced to 150 hours of community service with a £1,400 fine.

== Career statistics ==
=== Club ===
As of 15 August 2026

Appearances and goals by club, season and competition
Club	Season	League			National cup (Note: Includes FA Cup)		League cup (Note: Includes EFL Cup)		Other		Total	
Club	Season	Division	Apps	Goals	Apps	Goals	Apps	Goals	Apps	Goals	Apps	Goals
Lierse	2015–16	Belgian Second Division	2	0	0	0	—		—		2	0
Lierse	2016–17	Belgian First Division B	0	0	0	0	—		—		0	0
Lierse	Total		2	0	0	0	—		—		2	0
Queens Park Rangers	2017–18	Championship	4	1	1	0	2	0	—		7	1
Queens Park Rangers	2018–19	Championship	4	0	2	0	2	0	—		8	0
Queens Park Rangers	2019–20	Championship	41	4	2	0	2	1	—		45	5
Queens Park Rangers	2020–21	Championship	45	8	1	0	1	0	—		47	8
Queens Park Rangers	2021–22	Championship	39	9	1	0	3	0	—		43	9
Queens Park Rangers	2022–23	Championship	34	5	1	0	1	0	—		36	5
Queens Park Rangers	2023–24	Championship	44	7	0	0	0	0	—		44	7
Queens Park Rangers	2024–25	Championship	28	2	1	0	0	0	—		29	2
Queens Park Rangers	2025–26	Championship	15	1	0	0	0	0	—		15	1
Queens Park Rangers	2026–27	Championship	1	2	0	0	1	0	—		2	2
Total			255	39	9	0	12	1	—		276	40
Stevenage (loan)	2018–19	League Two	16	6	—		—		0	0	16	6
Career total			279	44	9	0	12	1	0	0	300	45

=== International ===
As of match played 17 December 2022

Appearances and goals by national team and year
National team	Year	Apps	Goals
Morocco	2021	7	1
Morocco	2022	5	0
Total		12	1

As of match played 27 September 2022. England score listed first, score column indicates score after each Chair goal.

List of international goals scored by Ilias Chair
No.	Date	Venue	Cap	Opponent	Score	Result	Competition	Ref.
1	6 October 2021	Prince Moulay Abdellah Stadium, Rabat, Morocco	4	Guinea-Bissau	3–0	5–0	2022 FIFA World Cup qualification	

== Honours ==
Individual

- Championship Goal of the Month: October 2021

Orders

- Order of the Throne: 2022
