= Charlie Owens (footballer) =

British footballer

Personal information
- Full name: Charlie Owens
- Date of birth: 7 December 1997 (age 28)
- Place of birth: Islington, London, England
- Position: Defensive midfielder

Youth career
- 2004–2017: Tottenham Hotspur
- 2017–2018: Queens Park Rangers

Senior career*
Years	Team	Apps	(Gls)
2018–2023	Queens Park Rangers	0	(0)
2019	→ Wycombe Wanderers (loan)	2	(0)
2022–2023	→ Colchester United (loan)	3	(0)
2023–2024	Boreham Wood	4	(0)
2024	Hayes & Yeading United	6	(1)
2024–2025	FC Palm City	12	(0)

International career
2015–2016	Northern Ireland U19	4	(0)
2017–2018	Northern Ireland U21	3	(0)
- * Club domestic league appearances and goals as of 20:53, 24 September 2024 (UTC)

Charlie Owens (born 7 December 1997) is a Northern Irish professional footballer who plays as a defensive midfielder.

== Club career ==
=== Queens Park Rangers ===
On 28 August 2018, Owens was named as a substitute in the second round of the 2018–19 EFL Cup against Bristol Rovers. He replaced Grant Hall in the 65th minute to make his first team and professional debut. In August 2019 Owens signed a new two-year deal under manager Mark Warburton.

==== Wycombe Wanderers (loan) ====
On 31 January 2019, Owens joined League One side Wycombe Wanderers on a loan deal, lasting until the end of the 2018–19 season. On 12 March 2019, Owens was named as a substitute against Accrington Stanley, he replaced Curtis Thompson in the 87th minute to make his EFL debut.

=== Boreham Wood ===
On 4 August 2023, Owens joined National League club Boreham Wood following an impressive pre-season with the club as a trialist.

=== Hayes & Yeading ===
In February 2024, Owens joined Southern Football League Premier Division South club Hayes & Yeading United.

=== FC Palm City ===
In November 2024, Owens signed for UAE Third Division League side FC Palm City (previously Al Qabila FC).

== Career statistics ==
As of match played 8 August 2022

Appearances and goals by club, season and competition
Club	Season	League			FA Cup		League Cup		Other		Total	
Club	Season	Division	Apps	Goals	Apps	Goals	Apps	Goals	Apps	Goals	Apps	Goals
Queens Park Rangers	2018–19	EFL Championship	0	0	0	0	1	0	—		1	0
Queens Park Rangers	2019–20	EFL Championship	0	0	0	0	2	0	—		2	0
Queens Park Rangers	2022–23	EFL Championship	0	0	0	0	2	0	—		2	0
Queens Park Rangers	Total		0	0	0	0	3	0	—		3	0
Wycombe Wanderers (loan)	2018–19	EFL League One	2	0	0	0	0	0	0	0	2	0
Colchester United (loan)	2022–23	EFL League Two	1	0	0	0	1	0	1 (Note: Appearances in the EFL Trophy)	0	3	0
Career total			3	0	0	0	4	0	1	0	8	0
