= Bright Osayi-Samuel =

Nigerian footballer (born 1997)

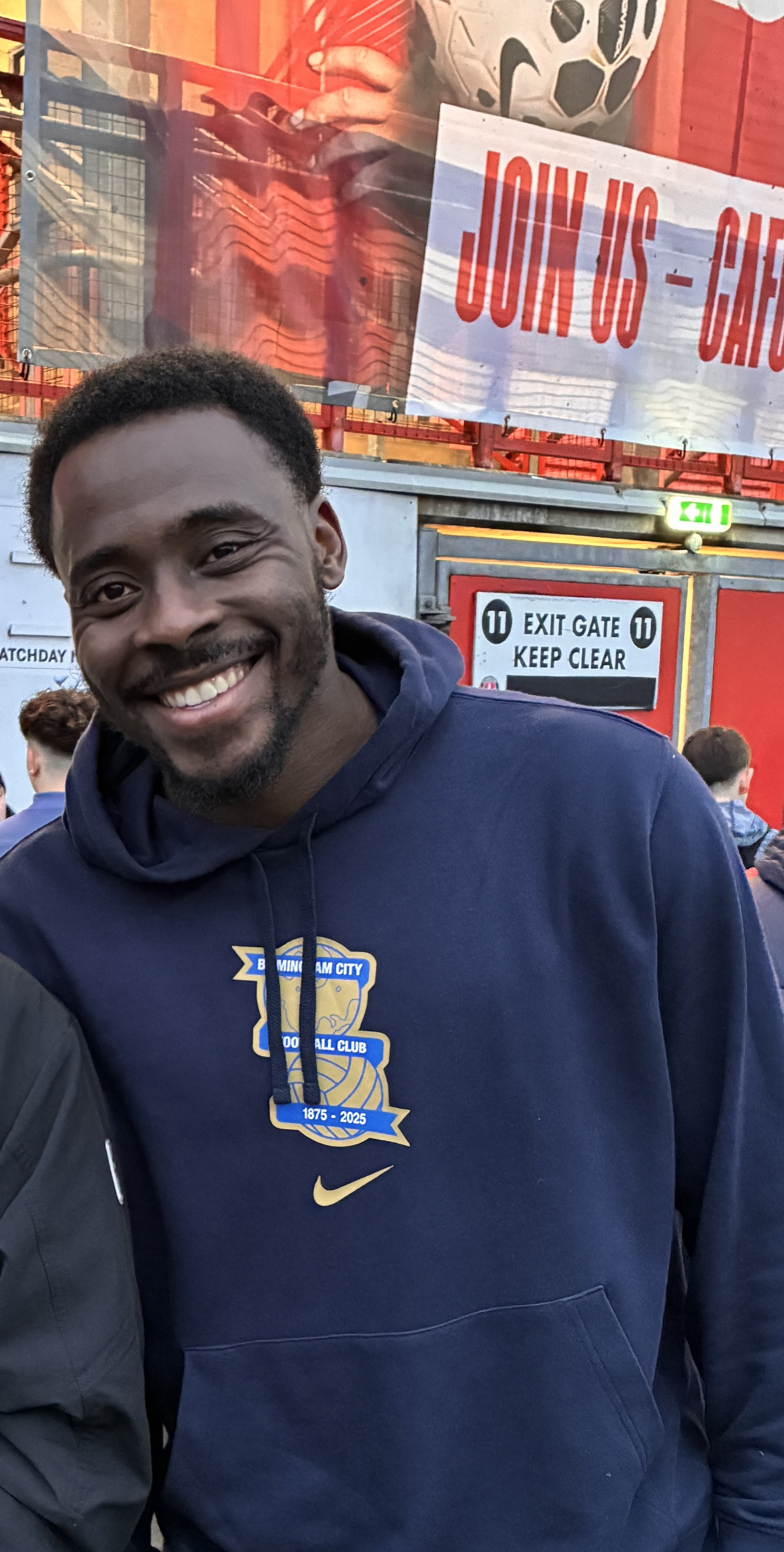
- Osayi-Samuel with Birmingham City in 2026

Personal information
- Full name: Bright Osayi-Samuel
- Date of birth: 31 December 1997 (age 28)
- Place of birth: Okija, Nigeria
- Height: 1.75 m (5 ft 9 in)
- Positions: Right-back; winger

Team information
- Current team: Birmingham City
- Number: 26

Youth career
- 2014–2015: Blackpool

Senior career*
Years	Team	Apps	(Gls)
2015–2017	Blackpool	64	(4)
2017–2021	Queens Park Rangers	103	(11)
2021–2025	Fenerbahçe	120	(6)
2025–	Birmingham City	27	(0)

International career^{‡}
2022–	Nigeria	37	(0)
Medal record
Representing Nigeria
Africa Cup of Nations
Runner-up	2023 Ivory Coast
Third place	2025 Morocco
- * Club domestic league appearances and goals as of 3 June 2026 ‡ National team caps and goals as of 23:14, 29 September 2026 (UTC)

Bright Osayi-Samuel MON (born 31 December 1997) is a Nigerian professional footballer who plays as a right-back or winger for EFL Championship club Birmingham City and the Nigeria national team. Osayi-Samuel is known for his tackling, dribbling and speed.

== Early life ==
Osayi-Samuel was born in Okija, Nigeria, then moved with his family to Spain before emigrating to England when he was ten years old, settling in Woolwich, London.

== Club career ==
=== Blackpool (2015–2017) ===
Osayi-Samuel was a youth academy graduate of Blackpool. He made his professional debut on 7 March 2015 in a 0–1 home defeat to Sheffield Wednesday.

On 10 December 2016, he scored his first professional goal against Stevenage in a 2–0 away win.

By the end of his career with the team, he had scored four goals in 64 league games, and five goals in 79 games, in all competitions.

=== Queens Park Rangers (2017–2021) ===
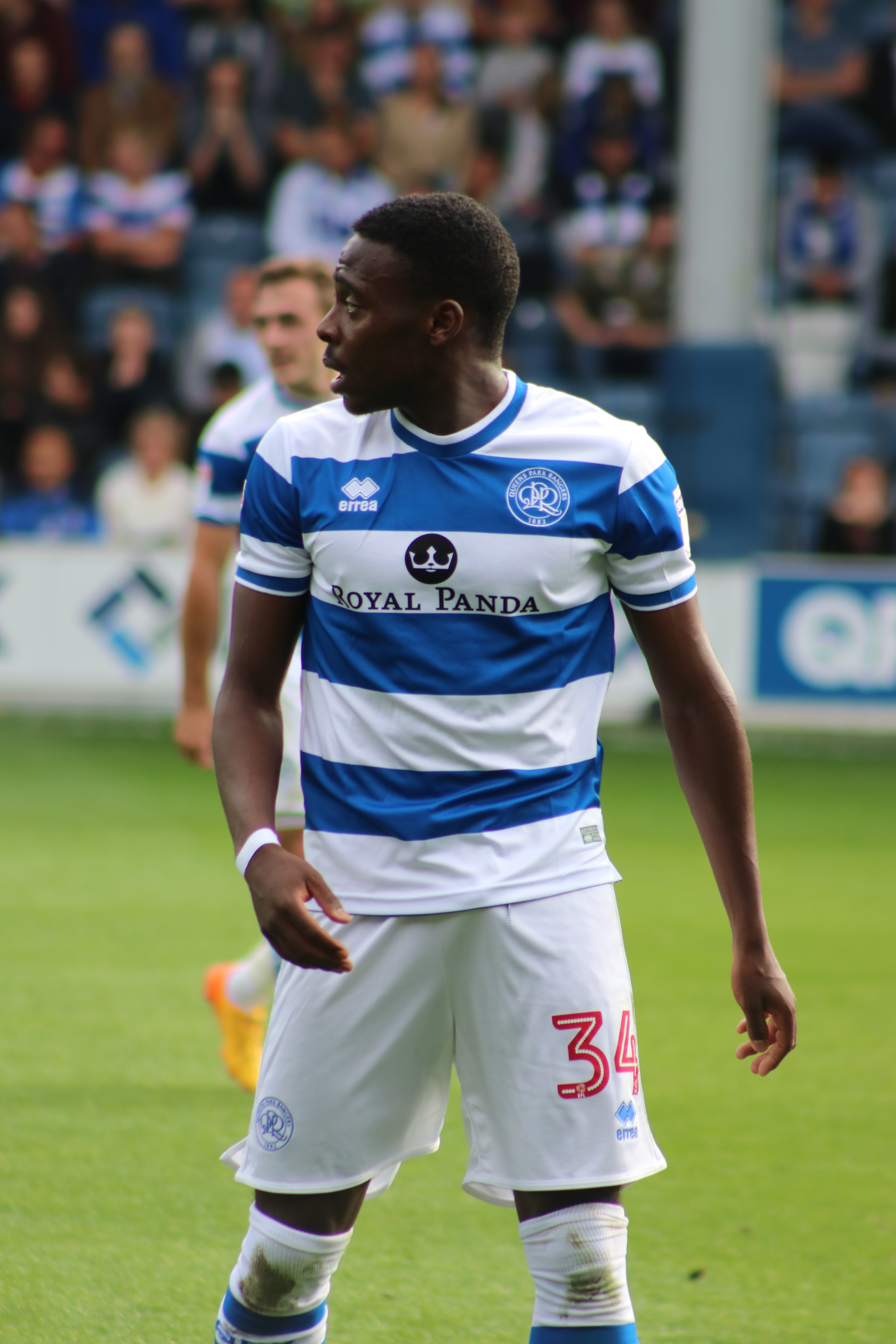
Osayi-Samuel playing for Queens Park Rangers in 2017.

On 1 September 2017, Osayi-Samuel joined Championship side Queens Park Rangers on a three-year deal.

He made his debut with the team on 23 September 2017 in a 0–0 home draw as a substitute against Burton Albion. On 28 April 2018, he scored his first goal with the team against Birmingham City in a 3–1 home win.

At the end of his career with the team, he scored 11 goals in 103 games. Also in all competitions, he scored 13 goals in 115 games.

=== Fenerbahçe (2021–2025) ===
On 15 January 2021, Osayi-Samuel signed a pre-contract agreement to join Turkish side Fenerbahçe on a four-year deal beginning in July 2021. In a turn of events, he joined the club on 23 January in an immediate transfer.

He made his debut in a 1–0 win over Çaykur Rizespor on 30 January 2021. On 8 March 2021, he scored his first goal away against Konyaspor in a Süper Lig match, in which Fenerbahçe won 3–0.

On 19 August 2021, he made his continental debut in his career in a 2021–22 UEFA Europa League qualifying round match against HJK Helsinki, a 1–0 home victory for Fenerbahçe.

=== Birmingham City ===
On 4 July 2025, Osayi-Samuel signed a three-year deal with newly promoted EFL Championship club Birmingham City. On 8 August, he made his debut for the club in a 1–1 draw against Ipswich Town in the league.

== International career ==
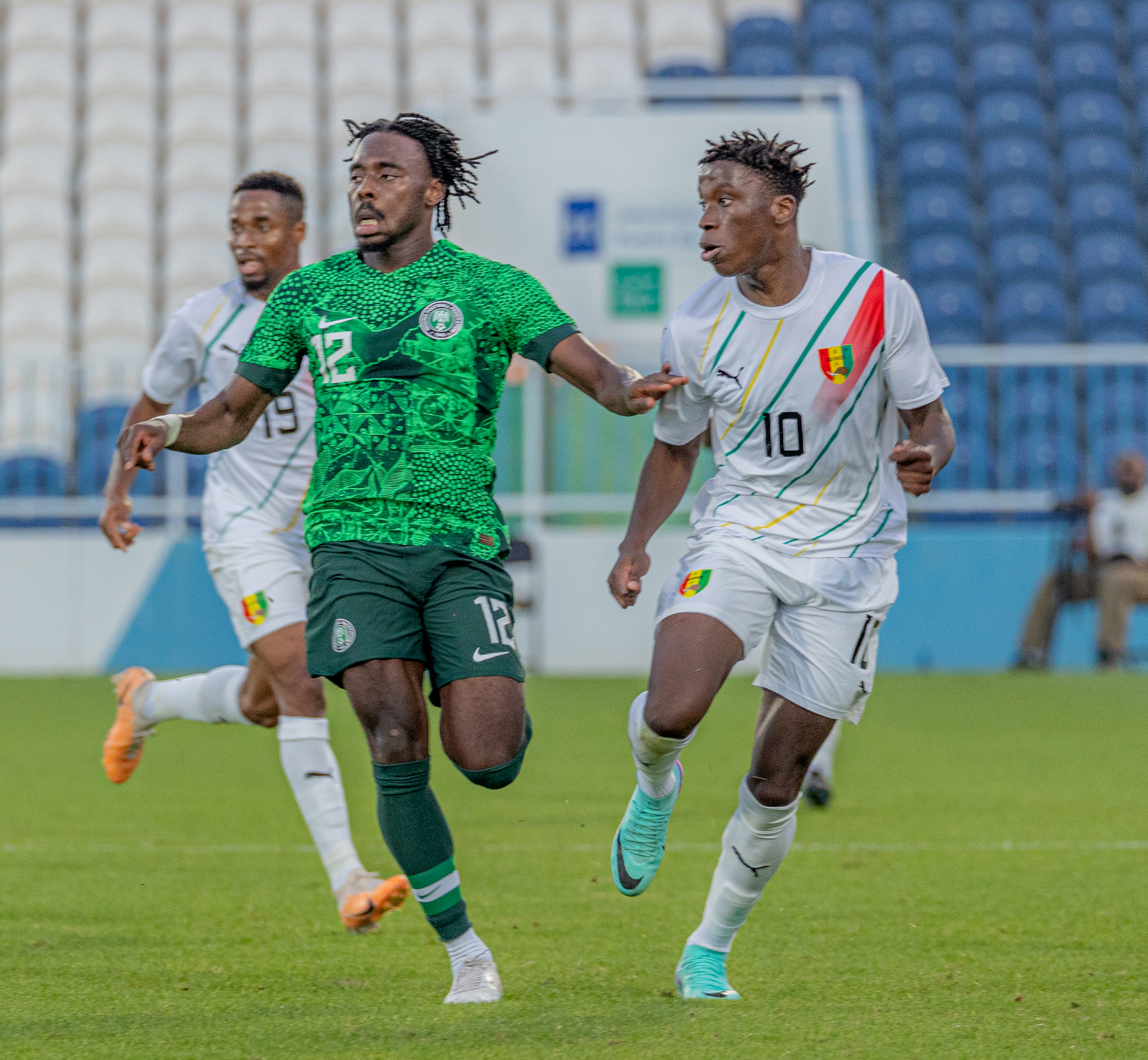
Osayi-Samuel playing for Nigeria in 2024.

After successful seasons with Fenerbahçe, on 11 November 2022, Osayi-Samuel received his first International call-up from Nigeria to play in a friendly game against Portugal. He was in the starting eleven and played 90 minutes for his international debut.

At the 2023 Africa Cup of Nations, Osayi-Samuel was a part of the 25-man Nigerian squad that emerged runners-up.

On 11 December 2025, Osayi-Samuel was called up to the Nigeria squad for the 2025 Africa Cup of Nations.

== Career statistics ==
=== Club ===
As of match played 6 April 2026

Appearances and goals by club, season and competition
Club	Season	League			National cup (Note: Includes FA Cup, Turkish Cup)		League cup (Note: Includes EFL Cup)		Continental		Other		Total	
Club	Season	Division	Apps	Goals	Apps	Goals	Apps	Goals	Apps	Goals	Apps	Goals	Apps	Goals
Blackpool	2014–15	Championship	6	0	0	0	0	0	—		—		6	0
Blackpool	2015–16	League One	23	0	0	0	1	0	—		2 (Note: Appearances in EFL Trophy)	0	26	0
Blackpool	2016–17	League Two	31	4	4	1	1	0	—		6 (Note: Four appearances in EFL Trophy, two appearances in League Two play-offs)	0	42	5
Blackpool	2017–18	League One	4	0	—		1	0	—		0	0	5	0
Blackpool	Total		64	4	4	1	3	0	—		8	0	79	5
Queens Park Rangers	2017–18	Championship	18	1	0	0	—		—		—		18	1
Queens Park Rangers	2018–19	Championship	27	2	4	0	3	1	—		—		34	3
Queens Park Rangers	2019–20	Championship	37	5	2	1	1	0	—		—		40	6
Queens Park Rangers	2020–21	Championship	21	3	1	0	1	0	—		—		23	3
Queens Park Rangers	Total		103	11	7	1	5	1	—		—		115	13
Fenerbahçe	2020–21	Süper Lig	18	1	1	0	—		—		—		19	1
Fenerbahçe	2021–22	Süper Lig	31	1	2	1	—		10 (Note: Eight appearances in UEFA Europa League, two appearances in UEFA Europa Conference League)	0	—		43	2
Fenerbahçe	2022–23	Süper Lig	23	0	4	0	—		11 (Note: Two appearances in UEFA Champions League, nine appearances in UEFA Europa League)	0	—		38	0
Fenerbahçe	2023–24	Süper Lig	23	4	1	0	—		15 (Note: Appearances in UEFA Europa Conference League)	0	0	0	39	4
Fenerbahçe	2024–25	Süper Lig	25	0	2	0	—		12 (Note: Three appearances in UEFA Champions League, nine appearances in UEFA Europa League)	0	—		39	0
Fenerbahçe	Total		120	6	10	1	—		48	0	0	0	178	7
Birmingham City	2025–26	Championship	22	0	1	0	1	0	—		—		24	0
Career total			309	21	22	3	9	1	48	0	8	0	396	25

=== International ===
As of match played 29 September 2026

Appearances and goals by national team and year
National team	Year	Apps	Goals
Nigeria	2022	1	0
Nigeria	2023	7	0
Nigeria	2024	12 (Note: Five appearances in 2023 Africa Cup of Nations)	0
Nigeria	2025	9 (Note: Two appearances in 2025 Africa Cup of Nations)	0
Nigeria	2026	8 (Note: Four appearances in 2025 Africa Cup of Nations)	0
Total		37	0

== Honours ==
Blackpool

- EFL League Two play-offs: 2017

Fenerbahçe

- Turkish Cup: 2022–23

Nigeria

- Africa Cup of Nations third place: 2025

Individual

- Queens Park Rangers Young Player of the Year: 2019–20
