= Marco Harboe Ramkilde =

Danish footballer (born 1998)

Marco Ramkilde
Personal information
- Full name: Marco Harboe Ramkilde
- Date of birth: 9 May 1998 (age 28)
- Place of birth: Aalborg, Denmark
- Height: 1.89 m (6 ft 2 in)
- Position: Centre-forward

Team information
- Current team: AB
- Number: 10

Youth career
- –2017: AaB

Senior career*
Years	Team	Apps	(Gls)
2016–2019	AaB	3	(0)
2020–2022	Queens Park Rangers	1	(0)
2022–2024	AaB	20	(2)
2023–2024	→ Hvidovre (loan)	6	(0)
2024–	AB	24	(10)

International career
2014	Denmark U16	2	(1)
2014–2015	Denmark U17	12	(2)
2015–2016	Denmark U18	6	(1)
2016–2017	Denmark U19	9	(3)
- * Club domestic league appearances and goals as of 18 June 2026

Marco Harboe Ramkilde (born 9 May 1998) is a Danish football player who plays as centre-forward for Danish 2nd Division side AB.

== Career ==
=== Club career ===
In 2016, Ramklide was called up for AaB first team. On 29 May 2016, he made his Danish Superliga debut against OB at EWII Park, replacing Christian Bassogog at the 59th minute.

Ramkilde left by the end of the 2018/19, where his contract expired. On 17 March 2020, Ramkilde joined Queens Park Rangers on an 18-month deal. Ramkilde left after the 2021/22 season when his contract expired making one appearance.

On 28 September 2022, Ramkilde returned to AaB as a free agent, signing a deal until the end of the year. In pursuit of more playing time, Ramkilde moved on 5 July 2023, to newly promoted Danish Superliga club Hvidovre IF on a loan deal for the upcoming 2023–24 season. Ramkilde only managed 92 minutes of playing time in Hvidvore due to injuries, and left Hvidovre at the end of the season.

On 17 June 2024, Ramkilde signed with Danish 2nd Division club AB.

== International career ==
Ramkilde has represented his country at various age groups. He was a member of Denmark national under-17 football team in the 2015 UEFA European Under-17 Championship qualification. Since September 2016, he has been member of Denmark national under-19 football team and played in 2017 UEFA European Under-19 Championship qualification.

== Career statistics ==
=== Club ===
As of match played 25 November 2025

Appearances and goals by club, season and competition
Club	Season	League			National Cup (Note: Includes Danish Cup, FA Cup)		League Cup (Note: Includes EFL Cup)		Other		Total	
Club	Season	Division	Apps	Goals	Apps	Goals	Apps	Goals	Apps	Goals	Apps	Goals
AaB	2015–16	Danish Superliga	1	0	0	0	—		—		1	0
AaB	2016–17	Danish Superliga	2	0	0	0	—		1 (Note: Appearance(s) in Danish Superliga European play-offs)	0	3	0
AaB	Total		3	0	0	0	—		1	0	4	0
QPR	2019–20	Championship	1	0	0	0	0	0	—		1	0
AaB	2022–23	Danish Superliga	20	2	5	1	—		—		25	3
Hvidovre (loan)	2023–24	Danish Superliga	6	0	0	0	—		—		6	0
AB	2024–25	Danish Second Division	11	3	0	0	—		—		11	3
AB	2025–26	Danish Second Division	4	5	1	0	—		—		5	5
AB	Total		15	8	1	0	—		—		16	8
Career total			45	10	6	1	0	0	1	0	52	11
