= Sinclair Armstrong =

Irish association football player

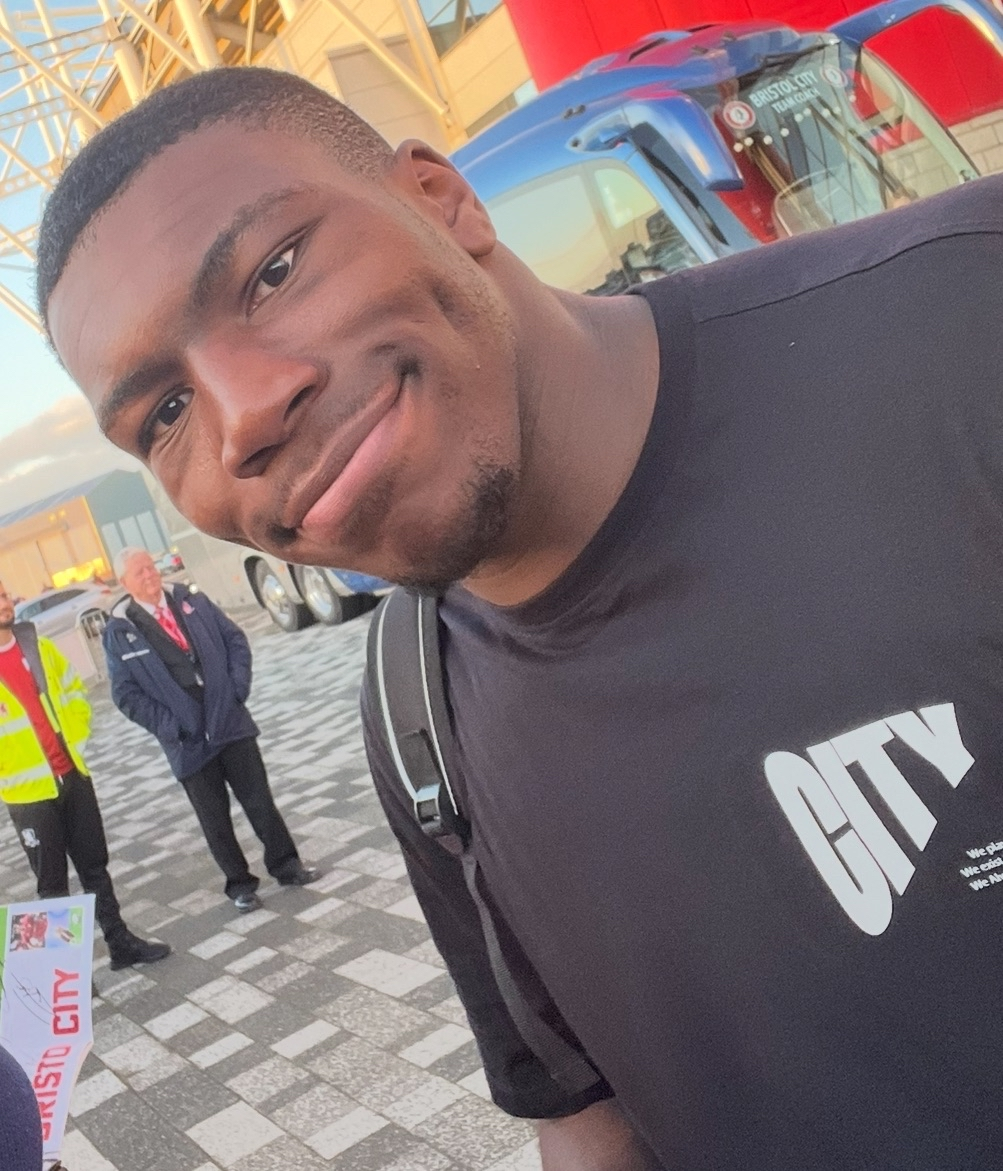
- Armstrong in 2024

Personal information
- Full name: Sinclair Ntomuchukwu Armstrong
- Date of birth: 22 June 2003 (age 23)
- Place of birth: Dublin, Ireland
- Height: 1.82 m (5 ft 11 1/2 in)
- Position: Forward

Team information
- Current team: Göztepe
- Number: 22

Youth career
- Cherry Orchard
- –2020: Shamrock Rovers

Senior career*
Years	Team	Apps	(Gls)
2018	Shamrock Rovers	0	(0)
2020	Shamrock Rovers II	6	(0)
2020–2024	Queens Park Rangers	61	(3)
2021–2022	→ Torquay United (loan)	8	(2)
2022	→ Aldershot Town (loan)	3	(2)
2024–2026	Bristol City	77	(7)
2026–	Göztepe	10	(2)

International career^{‡}
2019	Republic of Ireland U17	3	(1)
2021–2022	Republic of Ireland U19	4	(2)
2023–2024	Republic of Ireland U21	11	(7)
2023	Republic of Ireland	1	(0)
- * Club domestic league appearances and goals as of 11:07, 18 November 2026 (UTC) ‡ National team caps and goals as of 11:08, 18 November 2026 (UTC)

Sinclair Ntomuchukwu Armstrong (born 22 June 2003) is an Irish professional footballer who plays as a forward for Süper Lig club Göztepe and the Republic of Ireland national team.

== Club career ==
=== Early career ===
Initially starting his career with Cherry Orchard, Armstrong went onto sign for Shamrock Rovers, featuring for their underage sides before making his senior debut, aged 15, in August 2018 in a 1–0 loss to Drogheda United in the FAI Cup. He made 6 appearances for the club's reserve side Shamrock Rovers II in the League of Ireland First Division in 2020.

=== Queens Park Rangers ===
In late 2020, he made the move to Championship side Queens Park Rangers, following a successful trial period with the club.

On 18 October 2021, he earned his first loan move, joining National League club Torquay United until January 2022. Just five days later, he went onto score on his debut, netting the opener in their 2–0 home victory over King's Lynn Town. Armstrong went onto feature eight more times for The Gulls, adding another to his tally against Weymouth in December before returning to West London. In April 2022, he returned to the National League, this time joining Aldershot Town on loan for the remainder of the campaign. On 26 April 2022, Armstrong made his debut against Bromley, before days later scoring his first goal for the club during a 3–1 home victory over Notts County.

After an impactful pre-season ahead of the 2022–23 campaign, Armstrong was named in Queens Park Rangers' matchday squad for their first game of the season against Blackburn Rovers, in which he made his eventful debut featuring for the final 13 minutes in the 1–0 defeat.

In June 2024, QPR triggered an option in Armstrong's contract to extend his stay with the Championship side.

=== Bristol City ===
On 19 July 2024, Armstrong signed for Bristol City on a four-year deal. He remained at the club for 2 seasons, scoring 7 goals in 83 appearances in all competitions.

=== Göztepe ===
On 3 June 2026, Armstrong signed for Süper Lig side Göztepe for an undisclosed fee, believed to be in the region of €2,500,000, signing a four-year contract with an option of a further year.

== International career ==
Born in Ireland, Armstrong is of Nigerian descent. He has been capped for under-17 and under-19 youth level for the Republic of Ireland. On 8 September 2023, he received his first call up to the senior Republic of Ireland squad for their UEFA Euro 2024 qualifier at home to Netherlands 2 days later. He made his senior debut in the game, replacing Jason Knight in the 87th minute of a 2–1 loss at a sold out Aviva Stadium. He returned to the U21 side for their game 2 days later against San Marino U21 and scored his first goal at U21 level in a 3–0 win at Turners Cross.

== Personal life ==
Sinclair's younger brother Desmond plays for FC Lorient in France and the Ireland national under-17 football team.

== Career statistics ==
=== Club ===
As of match played on 7 November 2026

Appearances and goals by club, season and competition
Club	Season	League			National cup (Note: Includes FAI Cup, FA Cup & Turkish Cup)		League cup (Note: Includes League of Ireland Cup & EFL Cup)		Other		Total	
Club	Season	Division	Apps	Goals	Apps	Goals	Apps	Goals	Apps	Goals	Apps	Goals
Shamrock Rovers	2018	LOI Premier Division	0	0	1	0	0	0	0	0	1	0
Shamrock Rovers II	2020	LOI First Division	6	0	—		—		—		6	0
Queens Park Rangers	2020–21	Championship	0	0	0	0	—		—		0	0
Queens Park Rangers	2021–22	Championship	0	0	0	0	0	0	—		0	0
Queens Park Rangers	2022–23	Championship	22	0	1	0	1	0	—		24	0
Queens Park Rangers	2023–24	Championship	39	3	1	1	1	0	—		41	4
Queens Park Rangers	Total		61	3	2	1	2	0	—		65	4
Torquay United (loan)	2021–22	National League	8	2	0	0	—		1 (Note: Appearance(s) in the FA Trophy)	0	9	2
Aldershot Town (loan)	2021–22	National League	3	2	—		—		—		3	2
Bristol City	2024–25	Championship	36	3	0	0	1	0	1 (Note: Appearances in the 2024–25 EFL Championship play-offs)	0	38	3
Bristol City	2025–26	Championship	41	4	2	0	2	0	—		45	4
Bristol City	Total		77	7	2	0	3	0	1	0	83	7
Göztepe	2026–27	Süper Lig	10	2	0	0	—		—		10	2
Career total			165	16	5	1	5	0	2	0	177	17

=== International ===
As of match played 10 September 2023

Appearances and goals by national team and year
National team	Year	Apps	Goals
Republic of Ireland	2023	1	0
Total		1	0

== Honours ==
Individual

- Queens Park Rangers Young Player of the Year: 2022–23, 2023–24
