= Tim Dieng =

Tim Dieng might refer to:

- Timothée Dieng, French footballer
- Timothy Dieng, Swiss-Senegalese footballer
