= Ody Alfa =

Nigerian footballer

Personal information
- Full name: Odysseus Naphtali Alfa
- Date of birth: 9 March 1999 (age 27)
- Place of birth: Kaduna, Nigeria
- Height: 1.79 m (5 ft 10 in)
- Position: Forward

Youth career
- 2013–2019: Queens Park Rangers

Senior career*
| Years | Team | Apps | (Gls) |
| 2019–2023 | Queens Park Rangers | 0 | (0) |
| 2019 | → Atlético Baleares (loan) | 1 | (0) |
| 2019–2020 | → Billericay Town (loan) | 12 | (4) |
| 2020 | → Maidenhead United (loan) | 8 | (2) |
| 2022 | → Dartford (loan) | 11 | (0) |
| 2022–2023 | → Aldershot Town (loan) | 12 | (1) |
| 2023 | → Chelmsford City (loan) | 12 | (1) |
| 2023–2024 | Chelmsford City | 32 | (3) |
| 2024 | Rochdale | 3 | (0) |
| 2024–2025 | Slough Town | 13 | (0) |
| 2025–2026 | Bracknell Town | 18 | (1) |
- * Club domestic league appearances and goals as of 08:25, 6 May 2026 (UTC)

Odysseus Naphtali Alfa (born 9 March 1999) is a Nigerian professional footballer who plays as a forward.

== Career ==
Alfa signed for Queens Park Rangers in 2013 at the age of 14.

On 24 August 2021, Alfa was named in the squad for a second round EFL Cup game against Oxford United, he came off the bench on the 75th minute to made his senior QPR debut.

In January 2019, Alfa signed a new 18-month contract with QPR and joined Spanish side Atlético Baleares on loan for the rest of the season.

On 27 September 2019, Alfa joined National League South side Billericay Town on loan, during his time there he scored six goals.

On 16 January 2020, Alfa joined National League side Maidenhead United on loan, during his time there he made eight appearances and scored three goals.

On 9 February 2022, Alfa joined Dartford on loan for the remainder of the 2021–22 season.

On 13 September 2022, Alfa, along with QPR teammate Faysal Bettache, joined National League club Aldershot Town on a three-month loan deal.

On 3 February 2023, following the ending of his loan to Aldershot, Alfa signed for Chelmsford City on loan until the end of the season. He was released by QPR at the end of the 2022–23 season.

On 6 October 2023, Alfa returned to Chelmsford on a permanent deal.

On 25 July 2024, Alfa signed a one-year deal with Rochdale. In December 2024, he joined Slough Town. He departed Slough Town upon the expiration of his contract at the end of the 2024–25 season.

Alfa joined Bracknell Town in September 2025.

== Career statistics ==
As of end of 2025–26 season

Appearances and goals by club, season and competition
| Club | Season | League | | | National Cup | | League Cup | | Other | | Total | |
| Club | Season | Division | Apps | Goals | Apps | Goals | Apps | Goals | Apps | Goals | Apps | Goals |
|---|---|---|---|---|---|---|---|---|---|---|---|---|
| Queens Park Rangers | 2018–19 | Championship | 0 | 0 | 0 | 0 | 0 | 0 | — | | 0 | 0 |
| Queens Park Rangers | 2019–20 | Championship | 0 | 0 | — | | 0 | 0 | — | | 0 | 0 |
| Queens Park Rangers | 2020–21 | Championship | 0 | 0 | 0 | 0 | 0 | 0 | — | | 0 | 0 |
| Queens Park Rangers | 2021–22 | Championship | 0 | 0 | — | | 1 | 0 | — | | 1 | 0 |
| Queens Park Rangers | 2022–23 | Championship | 0 | 0 | 0 | 0 | 0 | 0 | — | | 0 | 0 |
| Queens Park Rangers | Total | | 0 | 0 | 0 | 0 | 1 | 0 | — | | 1 | 0 |
| Atlético Baleares (loan) | 2018–19 | Segunda División B Group 3 | 1 | 0 | 0 | 0 | — | | — | | 1 | 0 |
| Billericay Town (loan) | 2019–20 | National League South | 12 | 4 | 4 | 1 | — | | 1 (Note: Appearances in the FA Trophy) | 0 | 17 | 5 |
| Maidenhead United (loan) | 2019–20 | National League | 8 | 2 | — | | — | | — | | 8 | 2 |
| Dartford (loan) | 2021–22 | National League South | 11 | 0 | — | | — | | 1 | 0 | 12 | 0 |
| Aldershot Town (loan) | 2022–23 | National League | 12 | 1 | 1 | 0 | — | | 1 | 0 | 14 | 1 |
| Chelmsford City (loan) | 2022–23 | National League South | 12 | 1 | — | | — | | — | | 12 | 1 |
| Chelmsford City | 2023–24 | National League South | 32 | 3 | 2 | 0 | — | | 3 (Note: Two appearances in FA Trophy, one appearance in National League South play-offs) | 0 | 37 | 3 |
| Rochdale | 2024–25 | National League | 3 | 0 | 0 | 0 | — | | 2 (Note: Appearance(s) in National League Cup) | 0 | 5 | 0 |
| Slough Town | 2024–25 | National League South | 13 | 0 | 0 | 0 | — | | 1 | 0 | 14 | 0 |
| Bracknell Town | 2025–26 | SFL Premier Division South | 18 | 1 | 2 | 0 | — | | 0 | 0 | 20 | 1 |
| Career total | | | 122 | 12 | 9 | 1 | 1 | 0 | 9 | 0 | 141 | 13 |
