= Joe Gubbins =

English footballer

- Gubbins with Yeovil Town in 2026

Personal information
- Full name: Joseph Matthew Gubbins
- Date of birth: 3 August 2001 (age 25)
- Place of birth: Oxford, England
- Height: 1.82 m (6 ft 0 in)
- Position: Centre-back

Team information
- Current team: Yeovil Town
- Number: 15

Youth career
- –2017: Southampton
- 2017–2020: Queens Park Rangers

Senior career*
Years	Team	Apps	(Gls)
2020–2024	Queens Park Rangers	2	(0)
2020	→ Oxford City (loan)	7	(0)
2021	→ Aldershot Town (loan)	3	(0)
2022	→ Southend United (loan)	10	(0)
2023–2024	→ Accrington Stanley (loan)	37	(0)
2024–2026	Southend United	58	(0)
2026–	Yeovil Town	15	(1)
- * Club domestic league appearances and goals as of 22:34, 21 November 2026 (UTC)

Joseph Matthew Gubbins (born 3 August 2001) is an English professional footballer who plays as a centre back for National League club Yeovil Town.

== Career ==
=== Queens Park Rangers ===
Gubbins made his professional debut with Queens Park Rangers in a 5–1 FA Cup win over Swansea City on 5 January 2020.

On 6 October 2020, Gubbins joined National League South side Oxford City on a one month loan deal.

On 27 November 2021, Gubbins joined National League side Aldershot Town on a one-month loan deal.

On 24 March 2022, Gubbins joined National League side Southend United on loan for the remainder of the 2021–22 season.

On 25 August 2023, Gubbins joined League Two side Accrington Stanley on loan for the 2023–24 season.

On 22 May 2024, QPR announced he would leave in the summer when his contract expired.

=== Southend United ===
On 8 July 2024, Gubbins returned to National League side Southend United, signing a two-year deal.

=== Yeovil Town ===
On 11 June 2026, Gubbins agreed to join National League club Yeovil Town on a two-year deal. On 3 August 2026, he was named as vice-captain for the 2026–27 season.

== Career statistics ==
As of match played 21 November 2026

Appearances and goals by club, season and competition
Club	Season	League			FA Cup		League Cup		Other		Total	
Club	Season	Division	Apps	Goals	Apps	Goals	Apps	Goals	Apps	Goals	Apps	Goals
Queens Park Rangers	2019–20	Championship	1	0	1	0	0	0	—		2	0
Queens Park Rangers	2020–21	Championship	0	0	0	0	0	0	—		0	0
Queens Park Rangers	2021–22	Championship	0	0	0	0	1	0	—		1	0
Queens Park Rangers	2022–23	Championship	0	0	0	0	0	0	—		0	0
Queens Park Rangers	2023–24	Championship	1	0	0	0	1	0	—		2	0
Queens Park Rangers	Total		2	0	1	0	2	0	—		5	0
Oxford City (loan)	2020–21	National League South	7	0	—		—		0	0	7	0
Aldershot Town (loan)	2021–22	National League	3	0	—		—		0	0	3	0
Southend United (loan)	2021–22	National League	10	0	0	0	—		0	0	10	0
Accrington Stanley (loan)	2023–24	League Two	37	0	1	0	0	0	4 (Note: Appearance(s) in EFL Trophy)	0	42	0
Southend United	2024–25	National League	24	0	1	0	–		5 (Note: Two appearances in FA Trophy, three appearances in National League play-offs)	0	30	0
Southend United	2025–26	National League	34	0	2	0	–		5 (Note: Four appearances in FA Trophy, one appearance in National League play-offs)	0	41	0
Southend United	Total		58	0	3	0	—		10	0	71	0
Yeovil Town	2026–27	National League	15	1	3	0	–		1 (Note: Appearance in Somerset Premier Cup)	0	19	1
Career total			132	1	8	0	2	0	15	0	157	1

== Honours ==
Southend United

- FA Trophy: 2025–26
