= Osman Kakay =

Sierra Leonean footballer

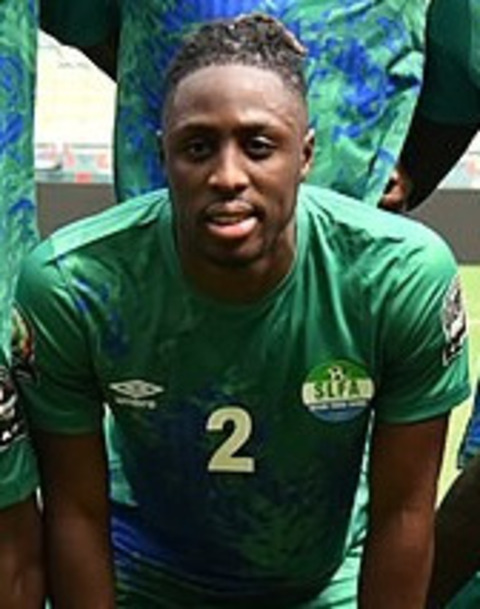
- Kakay with Sierra Leone in 2022

Personal information
- Full name: Osman Jovan Kakay
- Date of birth: 25 August 1997 (age 29)
- Place of birth: Westminster, England
- Height: 5 ft 11 in (1.80 m)
- Position: Defender

Team information
- Current team: FC Košice
- Number: 29

Youth career
- 2005–2015: Queens Park Rangers

Senior career*
Years	Team	Apps	(Gls)
2015–2024	Queens Park Rangers	98	(1)
2016	→ Livingston (loan)	10	(0)
2017	→ Chesterfield (loan)	8	(0)
2019	→ Partick Thistle (loan)	11	(0)
2025	Boavista	9	(0)
2025–	FC Košice	37	(2)

International career^{‡}
2018–	Sierra Leone	26	(0)
- * Club domestic league appearances and goals as of 21 September 2026 ‡ National team caps and goals as of 11:29, 29 January 2025 (UTC)

Osman Jovan Kakay (born 25 August 1997) is a professional footballer who plays as a defender for Slovak First League club FC Košice. Born in England, he plays for the Sierra Leone national team.

== Club career ==
=== Queens Park Rangers ===
After playing in Queens Park Rangers' academy, Kakay signed his first professional contract with the club in 2015. On 29 January 2016, he signed a new one-year deal to keep him at QPR until 2017, and joined Livingston on loan until the end of the season. Kakay made his professional debut on 30 January 2016, playing the full game in Livingston's 1–0 away loss to Dumbarton in the Scottish Championship.

He made his first QPR appearance in August 2016, starting out of position in the right of midfield in an EFL Cup second round victory over Rochdale, before being substituted after 73 minutes to an ovation from the Queens Park Rangers support.

On 31 January 2017, Kakay signed a loan deal at Chesterfield until the end of the 2016–17 season.

In November 2018, QPR offered Kakay a contract extension, extending his deal at Loftus Road to 2021.

On 2 September 2019, Kakay signed for Partick Thistle on loan until January 2020. Kakay originally played as a right back for Thistle, but played as a right winger for the majority of his stay at the Glasgow club.

On 5 September 2020, Kakay scored his first professional goal in an EFL Cup tie against Plymouth Argyle. He agreed a new contract until 2024 in September 2020.

On 1 May 2021, Kakay scored his first Championship goal in a 2–0 win away to Stoke City.

On 6 May 2024, QPR announced Kakay would be leaving the club in the summer when his contract expired.

=== Boavista ===
On 12 February 2025, Kakay joined Primeira Liga club Boavista on a free transfer, signing a contract until the end of the 2024–25 season.

=== FC Košice ===
On 16 July 2025, it was announced that Kakay would be joining Slovak First Football League side FC Košice on a two-year contract.

== International career ==
On 9 September 2018 Kakay made his international debut for Sierra Leone against Ethiopia in an Africa Cup of Nations qualifier.

In December 2021, Kakay was named in the Sierra Leone squad for the upcoming 2021 Africa Cup of Nations as the nation prepared for their first appearance at the competition since 1996. Kakay played the full ninety minutes of his side's opening match as they held one of the pre-tournament favourites and holders Algeria to a goalless draw.

== Career statistics ==
As of match played 25 April 2023

Appearances and goals by club, season and competition
Club	Season	League			National cup (Note: Includes FA Cup, Scottish Cup)		League cup (Note: Includes EFL Cup)		Other		Total	
Club	Season	Division	Apps	Goals	Apps	Goals	Apps	Goals	Apps	Goals	Apps	Goals
Queens Park Rangers	2015–16	Championship	0	0	0	0	0	0	—		0	0
Queens Park Rangers	2016–17	Championship	1	0	0	0	2	0	—		3	0
Queens Park Rangers	2017–18	Championship	2	0	0	0	0	0	—		2	0
Queens Park Rangers	2018–19	Championship	3	0	3	0	1	0	—		7	0
Queens Park Rangers	2019–20	Championship	7	0	0	0	0	0	—		7	0
Queens Park Rangers	2020–21	Championship	28	1	0	0	1	1	—		29	2
Queens Park Rangers	2021–22	Championship	13	0	0	0	4	0	—		17	0
Queens Park Rangers	2022–23	Championship	21	0	1	0	1	0	—		23	0
Queens Park Rangers	2023–24	Championship	23	0	1	0	1	0	—		25	0
Queens Park Rangers	Total		98	1	4	0	9	1	0	0	113	2
Livingston (loan)	2015–16	Scottish Championship	10	0	—		—		2 (Note: Appearances in Scottish Championship play-offs)	0	12	0
Chesterfield (loan)	2016–17	League One	8	0	—		—		—		8	0
Partick Thistle (loan)	2019–20	Scottish Championship	11	0	1	0	0	0	2 (Note: Appearances in Scottish Challenge Cup)	0	14	0
Career total			104	1	5	0	9	1	4	0	122	2
