= Sam Field (footballer) =

English footballer (born 1998)

Personal information
- Full name: Samuel Edward Field
- Date of birth: 8 May 1998 (age 28)
- Place of birth: Stourbridge, England
- Height: 6 ft 3 in (1.91 m)
- Position: Defensive midfielder

Team information
- Current team: Norwich City
- Number: 26

Youth career
- 2015–2016: West Bromwich Albion

Senior career*
Years	Team	Apps	(Gls)
2016–2021	West Bromwich Albion	34	(2)
2019–2020	→ Charlton Athletic (loan)	17	(0)
2021	→ Queens Park Rangers (loan)	19	(1)
2021–2026	Queens Park Rangers	171	(9)
2026	→ Norwich City (loan)	13	(0)
2026–	Norwich City	8	(0)

International career^{‡}
2016	England U18	2	(0)
2016–2017	England U19	8	(1)
2017–2019	England U20	12	(0)
- * Club domestic league appearances and goals as of 16:02, 7 November 2026 (UTC) ‡ National team caps and goals as of 10:24, 12 December 2024 (UTC)

Samuel Edward Field (born 8 May 1998) is an English professional footballer who plays as a defensive midfielder for EFL Championship club Norwich City.

== Club career ==
=== West Bromwich Albion ===
==== Early career ====
On 7 May 2016, Field was named on West Bromwich Albion's subs bench for the first time in their game against Bournemouth, having been named in the match day squad the week before against Manchester City. On 15 May 2016, Field then made his debut for West Brom in the Premier League against Liverpool coming on in the 86th minute to replace James McClean in a 1–1 draw. Prior to the match he was named West Brom's Academy Player of the Season. On 29 June 2016, Field signed a one-year deal with West Brom, with a possible 12-month extension in the club's favour, which was Field's first professional contract. He started his first game for West Brom in the EFL Cup against Northampton Town on 23 August 2016 in 4–3 penalty shootout loss after drawing 2–2 in extra time, with Field playing the full 120 minutes. On 28 August 2016, Field started his first Premier League game against Middlesbrough, playing 76 minutes in an eventual 0–0 draw. On 13 October 2016, Field signed a four-year deal with West Brom, contracting him to the club until 2020. On 1 November 2017, Field extended his stay by signing a one-year extension on improved terms, keeping him at the Hawthorns until 2021.

==== 2017–18 season ====
After the sacking of manager Tony Pulis, Field was given his first start of the season by caretaker manager Gary Megson versus Tottenham in a 1–1 draw at Wembley Stadium on 25 November. Field reprised his role three days later against Newcastle United, scoring his first Premier League goal in a 2–2 draw at the Hawthorns on 28 November.

==== 2019–20 season: Loan to Charlton Athletic ====
On 8 August 2019, Field and teammate Jonathan Leko joined Charlton Athletic on a season long loan.

=== Queens Park Rangers ===
On 1 February 2021, Field joined Queens Park Rangers on loan from West Bromwich Albion for the remainder of the season. He made his debut as a substitute against Brentford on 17 February, scoring the equaliser in a 2–1 victory. Field made 19 league appearances during the loan spell, scoring once as QPR finished ninth in the Championship.

On 20 May 2021, Field joined QPR permanently, signing a three-year contract. During the 2021–22 season, he made 29 league appearances as the club finished 11th in the Championship. His ability to operate in central midfield provided the team with a defensive option, and he increasingly became a regular selection in the side.

Field played a more prominent role during the 2022–23 season, appearing in all 46 league matches as QPR finished 20th in the Championship. He scored twice in the league and featured consistently during a difficult campaign in which the club struggled for form in the second half of the season.

In the 2023–24 season, Field continued as a regular in midfield, making 43 league appearances and scoring four goals. Under manager Martí Cifuentes, he remained an important part of the team as QPR recovered from a poor start to the campaign and secured their Championship status, finishing 18th. On 8 March 2024, he signed a new contract with the club, reported to run for three and a half years.

Field continued to feature regularly during the 2024–25 season, making 35 league appearances and scoring three goals as QPR finished 15th in the Championship. On 14 June 2025, he signed another contract extension with QPR. The club did not disclose the length of the new agreement, with Field expressing his desire to take on a greater leadership role within the squad.

During the 2025–26 season, Field made 18 league appearances for QPR before departing on loan in February 2026. By that point, he had made 179 appearances for the club across all competitions since first joining on loan in 2021.

=== Norwich City ===
On 2 February 2026, Field joined EFL Championship team Norwich City on loan until the end of the season. This move was made permanent on 18 June 2026.

== International career ==
Field was called up to the England national side at youth level for the first time on 17 May 2016 for their two match tour of South Korea in June. He made his debut on 3 June and was sent off in a 2–0 defeat against South Korea U17 after receiving two yellow cards.

In March 2017, Field scored for the England under-19 team against Norway in an elite qualifier for the 2017 UEFA European Under-19 Championship. Field was not released for selection at the subsequent tournament due to club commitments.

== Personal life ==
He is a lifelong West Bromwich Albion fan.

== Career statistics ==
As of match played 7 November 2026

Appearances and goals by club, season and competition
Club	Season	League			FA Cup		EFL Cup		Other		Total	
Club	Season	Division	Apps	Goals	Apps	Goals	Apps	Goals	Apps	Goals	Apps	Goals
West Bromwich Albion	2015–16	Premier League	1	0	0	0	0	0	—		1	0
West Bromwich Albion	2016–17	Premier League	8	0	0	0	1	0	—		9	0
West Bromwich Albion	2017–18	Premier League	10	1	2	0	0	0	—		12	1
West Bromwich Albion	2018–19	EFL Championship	12	1	3	0	3	0	—		18	1
West Bromwich Albion	2019–20	EFL Championship	0	0	0	0	0	0	—		0	0
West Bromwich Albion	2020–21	Premier League	3	0	0	0	2	0	—		5	0
West Bromwich Albion	Total		34	2	5	0	6	0	—		45	2
West Bromwich Albion U23	2017–18	—			—		—		1 (Note: Appearances in EFL Trophy)	0	1	0
Charlton Athletic (loan)	2019–20	EFL Championship	17	0	0	0	1	0	—		18	0
Queens Park Rangers (loan)	2020–21	EFL Championship	19	1	0	0	0	0	—		19	1
Queens Park Rangers	2021–22	EFL Championship	29	0	0	0	0	0	—		29	0
Queens Park Rangers	2022–23	EFL Championship	46	2	1	1	1	0	—		48	3
Queens Park Rangers	2023–24	EFL Championship	43	4	1	0	1	0	—		45	4
Queens Park Rangers	2024–25	EFL Championship	35	3	1	0	2	1	—		38	4
Queens Park Rangers	2025–26	EFL Championship	18	0	1	0	0	0	—		19	0
Queens Park Rangers	Total		171	9	4	1	4	1	—		179	11
Norwich City (loan)	2025–26	EFL Championship	13	0	2	0	—		—		15	0
Norwich City	2026–27	EFL Championship	8	0	0	0	1	0	—		9	0
Career total			262	12	11	1	12	1	1	0	286	14

== Honours ==
Individual

- West Bromwich Albion Academy Player of the Season: 2015–16
- Queens Park Rangers Player of the Year: 2022–23
- Queens Park Rangers Players' Player of the Year: 2022–23
