= Aaron Drewe =

English footballer (born 2001)

Personal information
- Full name: Aaron Michael Drewe
- Date of birth: 8 February 2001 (age 25)
- Place of birth: Chiltern Hills, England
- Height: 1.75 m (5 ft 9 in)
- Position: Defender

Team information
- Current team: AFC Fylde
- Number: 29

Youth career
- 2011–2019: Queens Park Rangers

Senior career*
Years	Team	Apps	(Gls)
2019–2024	Queens Park Rangers	9	(0)
2019	→ Chelmsford City (loan)	0	(0)
2021	→ Oxford City (loan)	17	(2)
2021–2022	→ Weymouth (loan)	19	(0)
2024–2025	Oxford City	37	(1)
2025–2026	Woking	45	(4)
2026–	AFC Fylde	0	(0)
- * Club domestic league appearances and goals as of 15:35, 25 April 2026 (UTC)

Aaron Michael Drewe (born 8 February 2001) is an English professional footballer who plays as a defender for National League club AFC Fylde.

== Career ==
Drewe joined Queens Park Rangers aged nine years old, and has represented QPR throughout all youth levels. In November 2019, Drewe joined National League South side Chelmsford City on a one-month loan deal. He made just one appearance for Chelmsford, coming in the Essex Senior Cup. In October 2020, Drewe joined National League South side Oxford City on loan. On 8 January 2022, Drewe made his professional debut for Queens Park Rangers as an extra-time substitute in a penalty shootout victory over Rotherham United in the FA Cup. On 25 January 2022, Drewe joined National League side Weymouth on loan. Following the conclusion of the 2023–24 season, Drewe was released by Queens Park Rangers upon the expiration of his contract.

On 27 September 2024, Drewe returned to National League North side Oxford City.

On 17 June 2025, it was announced that Drewe would join National League side, Woking on a one-year deal. He scored his first goal for the club in a game against York On 29 May 2026, it was announced that Drewe would leave the club after failing to agree a new contract. He left the club recording 54 appearances and scoring 4 goals in all competitions.

On 25 July 2026, Drewe joined fellow National League side, AFC Fylde on a one-year deal following his departure from Woking.

== Personal life ==
Born in England, Drewe is of Anglo Indian descent.

== Career statistics ==
As of match played on 25 April 2026

Appearances and goals by club, season and competition
Club	Season	League			FA Cup		EFL Cup		Other		Total	
Club	Season	Division	Apps	Goals	Apps	Goals	Apps	Goals	Apps	Goals	Apps	Goals
Queens Park Rangers	2019–20	Championship	0	0	0	0	0	0	—		0	0
Queens Park Rangers	2020–21	Championship	0	0	0	0	0	0	—		0	0
Queens Park Rangers	2021–22	Championship	0	0	1	0	0	0	—		1	0
Queens Park Rangers	2022–23	Championship	7	0	0	0	1	0	—		8	0
Queens Park Rangers	2023–24	Championship	2	0	1	0	1	0	—		4	0
Queens Park Rangers	Total		9	0	2	0	2	0	—		13	0
Chelmsford City (loan)	2019–20	National League South	0	0	0	0	—		0	0	0	0
Oxford City (loan)	2020–21	National League South	17	2	3	0	—		4 (Note: Appearances in the FA Trophy)	0	24	2
Weymouth (loan)	2021–22	National League	19	0	—		—		—		19	0
Oxford City	2024–25	National League North	37	1	0	0	—		5	0	42	1
Woking	2025–26	National League	45	4	2	0	—		7 (Note: Four appearances in the National League Cup, three in the FA Trophy)	0	54	4
AFC Fylde	2026–27	National League	0	0	0	0	—		0	0	0	0
Career total			127	7	7	0	2	0	16	0	152	7
