= Murphy Cooper =

English footballer (born 2001)

- Murphy Cooper in 2026

Personal information
- Full name: Murphy Joseph Cooper
- Date of birth: 27 December 2001 (age 24)
- Place of birth: Reading, England
- Height: 6 ft 1 in (1.86 m)
- Position: Goalkeeper

Team information
- Current team: Plymouth Argyle
- Number: 1

Youth career
- Caversham AFC
- 2010–2012: Wycombe Wanderers
- 2012–2021: Queens Park Rangers

Senior career*
Years	Team	Apps	(Gls)
2021–2026	Queens Park Rangers	2	(0)
2021	→ Welling United (loan)	5	(0)
2021	→ Bath City (loan)	2	(0)
2021–2022	→ Stratford Town (loan)	6	(0)
2023	→ Swindon Town (loan)	23	(0)
2024–2025	→ Stevenage (loan)	37	(0)
2025–2026	→ Barnsley (loan)	21	(0)
2026	→ Sheffield Wednesday (loan)	8	(0)
2026–	Plymouth Argyle	13	(0)
- * Club domestic league appearances and goals as of 17:04, 24 October 2026 (UTC)

Murphy Joseph Cooper (formerly Mahoney, born 27 December 2001) is an English professional footballer who plays as a goalkeeper for EFL League One club Plymouth Argyle.

== Club career ==
Starting his career with local side, Caversham AFC, Cooper joined Queens Park Rangers in 2012, following a two-year spell at Wycombe Wanderers prior to their academy closing. During the 2021–22 campaign, Cooper spent time on loan in the National League South with Welling United and Bath City before eventually joining Stratford Town over the Christmas period. Upon his return to West London, he went onto make his debut for the club during a 2–1 away defeat to Preston North End, stepping in for the injured Kieren Westwood.

On 28 June 2022, Cooper signed a new two-year deal with QPR, keeping him with the club until 2024.

On 29 June 2023, Cooper signed for League Two club Swindon Town on loan for the duration of the 2023–24 season. He was ever-present for Swindon Town in EFL League Two until his loan spell was abruptly cut-short due to a hamstring injury sustained in the 2–1 loss at Tranmere Rovers in December 2023.

On 3 August 2024, Cooper joined League One club Stevenage on a season-long loan deal.

On 23 June 2025, Cooper signed a new contract with the R's before returning to League One, joining Barnsley on a season-long loan. In January, Barnsley activated a clause to end the goalkeeper's loan agreement early.

On 16 January 2026, Cooper signed on loan with Championship side Sheffield Wednesday until the end of the season, to replace the injured Pierce Charles. He made his debut the following day, starting the game against Portsmouth. He was voted the clubs player of the month for January after also featuring in the Championship and EFL teams of the week. He picked up a groin injury in February which would see him ruled out for three-to-four weeks, with Wednesday having to loan in Seny Dieng on an emergency loan to cover him. With Pierce Charles returning to fitness during his injury, he wouldn't return to the starting lineup until April against Middlesbrough.

On 14 July 2026, Cooper signed a two-year contract at EFL League One club Plymouth Argyle, for an undisclosed fee.

== Personal life ==
Cooper was known as Murphy Mahoney until he changed his name by deed poll in July 2024.

== Career statistics ==
As of match played 24 October 2026

Appearances and goals by club, season and competition
Club	Season	League			FA Cup		League Cup		Other		Total	
Club	Season	Division	Apps	Goals	Apps	Goals	Apps	Goals	Apps	Goals	Apps	Goals
Queens Park Rangers	2021–22	Championship	2	0	—		0	0	—		2	0
Queens Park Rangers	2022–23	Championship	0	0	0	0	0	0	—		0	0
Queens Park Rangers	2023–24	Championship	0	0	0	0	0	0	—		0	0
Queens Park Rangers	2024–25	Championship	0	0	0	0	0	0	—		0	0
Queens Park Rangers	2025–26	Championship	0	0	0	0	0	0	—		0	0
Queens Park Rangers	Total		2	0	0	0	0	0	—		2	0
Welling United (loan)	2021–22	National League South	5	0	—		—		0	0	5	0
Bath City (loan)	2021–22	National League South	2	0	1	0	—		0	0	3	0
Stratford Town (loan)	2021–22	Southern League Premier Division Central	6	0	—		—		—		6	0
Swindon Town (loan)	2023–24	League Two	23	0	1	0	1	0	0	0	25	0
Stevenage (loan)	2024–25	League One	37	0	2	0	1	0	0	0	40	0
Barnsley (loan)	2025–26	League One	21	0	3	0	3	0	1 (Note: Appearance(s) in EFL Trophy)	0	28	0
Sheffield Wednesday (loan)	2025–26	Championship	8	0	0	0	0	0	0	0	8	0
Plymouth Argyle	2026–27	League One	13	0	0	0	1	0	0	0	14	0
Career total			117	0	7	0	6	0	1	0	131	0
