= 2022–23 Queens Park Rangers F.C. season =

English football club season

Queens Park Rangers
2022–23 season
- Chairman: Amit Bhatia
- Head Coach: Michael Beale (until 28 November); Neil Critchley (between 11 December and 19 February); Gareth Ainsworth (from 21 February)
- Stadium: Loftus Road
- EFL Championship: 20th
- FA Cup: Third round
- EFL Cup: First round
- Top goalscorer: League: Lyndon Dykes (8); All: Lyndon Dykes (8)
- Highest home attendance: 17,335 vs. Bristol City (8 May, Championship)
- Lowest home attendance: 12,230 vs. Rotherham United (20 August, Championship)
- Average home league attendance: 14,973
- Biggest win: 3–0 vs Cardiff City, Championship, 19 October 2022
- Biggest defeat: 1-6 vs Blackpool, Championship, 14 March 2023
Home colours	Away colours

The 2022–23 season was the 141st season in the existence of Queens Park Rangers Football Club and the club's eighth consecutive season in the Championship. In addition to the league, they also competed in the 2022–23 FA Cup and the 2022–23 EFL Cup.

== First team squad ==
As of 8 May 2023

No.	Name	Nat	Position	Since	Date of birth (age)	Signed from	Contract Expires	Games	Goals
Goalkeepers
1	Seny Dieng	(Senegal)	GK	2016	23 November 1994 (age 31)	(Germany) MSV Duisburg	2024	121	1
13	Jordan Archer	(Scotland)	GK	2021	12 April 1993 (age 33)	(England) Middlesbrough	2023	3	0
32	Joe Walsh	(England)	GK	2021	1 April 2002 (age 24)	(England) Gillingham	2024	0	0
38	Murphy Mahoney	(England)	GK	2012	27 December 2001 (age 24)	(England) Wycombe Wanderers	2024	2	0
Defenders
2	Osman Kakay	(Sierra Leone)	RWB	2015	25 August 1997 (age 29)	(England) Queens Park Rangers Academy	2024	88	2
3	Jimmy Dunne	(Republic of Ireland)	CB	2021	19 October 1997 (age 28)	(England) Burnley	2024	84	5
4	Rob Dickie	(England)	CB	2020	3 March 1996 (age 30)	(England) Oxford United	2024	129	8
5	Jake Clarke-Salter	(England)	CB	2022	22 September 1997 (age 29)	(England) Chelsea	2026	16	0
16	Niko Hämäläinen	(Finland)	LWB	2014	5 March 1997 (age 29)	(United States) FC Dallas	2024	33	0
22	Kenneth Paal	(Suriname)	LWB	2022	24 June 1997 (age 29)	(Netherlands) PEC Zwolle F.C.	2025	41	1
23	Conor Masterson	(Republic of Ireland)	CB	2019	8 September 1998 (age 28)	(England) Liverpool	2023	21	1
26	Leon Balogun	(Nigeria)	CB	2022	28 June 1988 (age 38)	(Scotland) Rangers	2023	12	1
27	Ethan Laird	(England)	RWB	2022	5 August 2001 (age 25)	(England) Manchester United	Loan	33	1
28	Joe Gubbins	(England)	CB	2019	3 August 2001 (age 25)	(England) Queens Park Rangers Academy	2023	3	0
29	Aaron Drewe	(England)	RWB	2019	8 February 2001 (age 25)	(England) Queens Park Rangers Academy	2023	9	0
Midfielders
6	Stefan Johansen (captain)	(Norway)	CM/DM	2021	8 January 1991 (age 35)	(England) Fulham	2024	86	7
7	Chris Willock	(England)	AM/RM/LM	2020	31 January 1998 (age 28)	(Portugal) Benfica	2023	105	16
8	Luke Amos	(England)	CM/DM	2019	23 February 1997 (age 29)	(England) Tottenham Hotspur	2023	95	8
10	Ilias Chair	(Morocco)	AM/RM/LM	2017	30 October 1997 (age 28)	(Belgium) Lierse	2025	192	28
14	George Thomas	(Wales)	AM/RM/LM	2020	24 March 1997 (age 29)	(England) Leicester City	2023	46	0
15	Sam Field	(England)	CM/DM	2021	8 May 1998 (age 28)	(England) West Bromwich Albion	2024	97	4
17	Andre Dozzell	(England)	CM/AM/DM	2021	2 May 1999 (age 27)	(England) Ipswich Town	2024	71	0
19	Elijah Dixon-Bonner	(England)	CM	2022	1 January 2001 (age 25)	(England) Liverpool	2023	1	0
20	Taylor Richards	(England)	AM/RM/LM	2022	4 December 2000 (age 25)	(England) Brighton & Hove Albion	Loan	16	0
24	Charlie Owens	(Northern Ireland)	CM/DM	2017	7 December 1997 (age 28)	(England) Tottenham Hotspur	2023	3	0
25	Olamide Shodipo	(Republic of Ireland)	AM/RM/LM	2015	5 July 1997 (age 29)	(England) Queens Park Rangers Academy	2023	44	0
37	Albert Adomah	(Ghana)	AM/RM/LM	2020	13 December 1987 (age 38)	(England) Nottingham Forest	2024	112	6
47	Tim Iroegbunam	(England)	CM/DM	2022	30 June 2003 (age 23)	(England) Aston Villa	Loan	32	2
Forwards
9	Lyndon Dykes	(Scotland)	CF	2020	7 October 1995 (age 31)	(Scotland) Livingston	2024	120	29
11	Tyler Roberts	(Wales)	CF	2022	12 January 1999 (age 27)	(England) Leeds United	Loan	19	4
14	Chris Martin	(Scotland)	CF	2022	4 November 1988 (age 37)	(England) Bristol City	2023	15	4
18	Macauley Bonne	(Zimbabwe)	CF	2020	26 October 1995 (age 30)	(England) Charlton Athletic	2023	44	3
18	Jamal Lowe	(Jamaica)	FW	2020	21 November 1994 (age 31)	(England) AFC Bournemouth	Loan	20	2
30	Sinclair Armstrong	(Republic of Ireland)	CF	2020	22 June 2003 (age 23)	(Republic of Ireland) Shamrock Rovers	2023	24	0

== Kit ==
Supplier: Erreà / Sponsor: Convivia

Home	Home alt.	Home alt.	Away	Away alt.	Away alt.

=== Kit information ===
QPR agreed a multi-year partnership with Erreà as the official technical kit suppliers, the 2022–23 season will be the sixth year of the deal. The kits will be 100 percent bespoke designs for the duration of the deal. On 8 December 2022 QPR announced that the kit deal with Erreà had been extended until the end of the 2025/26 season.

On 27 June 2022 Convivia were announced as the main shirt sponsor for the 2022–23 season on a three-year deal.

== Transfers ==
=== In ===
Date	Pos	Player	Transferred from	Fee	Ref
14 June 2022	MF	(England) Jabari Christmas	Kinetic Foundation	Free Transfer	
14 June 2022	FW	(England) Kieran Petrie	Free agent	Free Transfer	
19 June 2022	LB	(Suriname) Kenneth Paal	(Netherlands) PEC Zwolle	Free Transfer	
1 July 2022 (Note: The transfer was announced on 17 June, and would become official on July 1 once his Chelsea contract expired)	CB	(England) Jake Clarke-Salter	(England) Chelsea	Free Transfer	
26 August 2022	CB	(Nigeria) Leon Balogun	(Scotland) Rangers	Free Transfer	
13 October 2022	CM	(England) Elijah Dixon-Bonner	(England) Liverpool	Free Transfer	
6 February 2023	CF	(Scotland) Chris Martin	(England) Bristol City	Free Transfer	
20 February 2023	LW	(England) Reece Nicholas-Davies	(England) Derby County	Free Transfer	

=== Out ===
Date	Pos	Player	Transferred to	Fee	Ref
21 June 2022	CB	(Netherlands) Jordy de Wijs	(Germany) Fortuna Düsseldorf	Undisclosed	
30 June 2022	CF	(England) Charlie Austin	(Australia) Brisbane Roar	Released	
30 June 2022	AM	(Portugal) Brandon Aveiro	(England) Slough Town	Released	
30 June 2022	DM	(England) Dominic Ball	(England) Ipswich Town	Released	
30 June 2022	CM	(Northern Ireland) Amrit Bansal-McNulty	Unattached	Released	
30 June 2022	CB	(France) Yoann Barbet	(France) Bordeaux	Released	
30 June 2022	GK	(Jamaica) Dillon Barnes	Unattached	Released	
30 June 2022	CB	(Republic of Ireland) Nathan Carlyle	(England) Weymouth	Released	
30 June 2022	LB	(Albania) Franklin Domi	(England) Ebbsfleet United	Released	
30 June 2022	CM	(England) Jake Frailing	(England) Eastbourne Borough	Released	
30 June 2022	GK	(England) Max Little	(Scotland) Dunfermline Athletic	Released	
30 June 2022	GK	(Scotland) David Marshall	(Scotland) Hibernian	Released	
30 June 2022	GK	(England) Tom Middlehurst	(England) Maldon & Tiptree	Released	
30 June 2022	RB	(England) Moses Odubajo	(Greece) Aris	Released	
30 June 2022	CF	(Denmark) Marco Ramkilde	(Denmark) AaB	Released	
30 June 2022	CM	(Saint Lucia) Shiloh Remy	(England) Eastbourne Borough	Released	
30 June 2022	LB	(Scotland) Lee Wallace	Retired	Released	
30 June 2022	GK	(Republic of Ireland) Keiren Westwood	Unattached	Released	
30 June 2022	RB	(England) Kayden Williams-Lowe	(England) Peterborough Sports	Released	
30 June 2022	LB	(England) Kai Woollard-Innocent	(England) Eastbourne Borough	Released	
10 August 2022	MF	(England) Raheem Conte	(Wales) Cardiff City	Free Transfer	
4 January 2023	CF	(England) Sean Adarkwa	(Scotland) Arbroath	Free Transfer	
4 January 2023	CF	(Zimbabwe) Macauley Bonne	(England) Charlton Athletic	Mutual Consent	
20 January 2023	CM	(England) Faysal Bettache	(United States) St. Louis City SC 2	Mutual Consent	
31 January 2023	AM	(Wales) George Thomas	(England) Cambridge United	Mutual Consent	

=== Loans in ===
Date	Pos	Player	Loaned from	On loan until	Ref
6 July 2022	SS	(Wales) Tyler Roberts	(England) Leeds United	End of Season	
22 July 2022	AM	(England) Taylor Richards	(England) Brighton & Hove Albion	End of Season	
15 August 2022	RB	(England) Ethan Laird	(England) Manchester United	End of Season	
1 September 2022	CM	(England) Tim Iroegbunam	(England) Aston Villa	End of Season	
11 January 2023	RW	(Jamaica) Jamal Lowe	(England) Bournemouth	End of Season	

=== Loans out ===
Date	Pos	Player	Loaned to	On loan until	Ref
25 July 2022	CF	(United States) Charlie Kelman	(England) Leyton Orient	End of Season	
12 August 2022	DM	(Northern Ireland) Charlie Owens	(England) Colchester United	7 January 2023	
12 August 2022	GK	(England) Matteo Salamon	(England) Uxbridge	5 September 2022	
1 September 2022	RM	(Guyana) Stephen Duke-McKenna	(England) Leyton Orient	End of Season	
13 September 2022	LW	(Nigeria) Ody Alfa	(England) Aldershot Town	16 December 2022 (Note: On 16 December, Alfa's loan at Aldershot was extended.)	
13 September 2022	CM	(England) Faysal Bettache	(England) Aldershot Town	13 December 2022	
16 September 2022	GK	(England) Matteo Salamon	(England) Hampton & Richmond Borough	28 January 2023 (Note: On 14 October, Salamon's loan at Hampton was extended until mid-December.) (Note: On 13 December, Salamon's loan at Hampton was extended further)	
16 September 2022	GK	(England) Joe Walsh	(England) Hampton & Richmond Borough	13 December 2022 (Note: On 14 October, Walsh's loan at Hampton was extended until mid-December.) (Note: On 17 November, Walsh was recalled to QPR and loaned out again, to Dorking Wanderers.)	
8 October 2022	LM	(Sri Lanka) Dillon De Silva	(England) Torquay United	28 February 2023 (Note: On 9 January, De Silva's loan at Torquay was extended)	
12 November 2022	AM	(England) Stan Flaherty	(England) Hayes & Yeading United	11 February 2023 (Note: On 9 January, Flaherty's loan at Hayes & Yeading was extended by a further month)	
17 November 2022	GK	(England) Joe Walsh	(England) Dorking Wanderers	7 January 2023	
22 November 2022	CF	(England) Sean Adarkwa	(England) Maidstone United	19 December 2022	
25 November 2022	LB	(Scotland) Isaac Pitblado	(England) Cheshunt	End of Season (Note: On 4 February, Pitblado's loan at Cheshunt was extended by a further month and then on 31 January, the loan was extended until the end of the season)	
26 November 2022	DF	(England) Trent Rendall	(England) Gloucester City	1 January 2023	
3 December 2022	MF	(England) Arkell Jude-Boyd	(England) Dagenham & Redbridge	3 January 2023	
14 January 2023	LW	(Republic of Ireland) Olamide Shodipo	(England) Lincoln City	End of Season	
26 January 2023	CF	(England) Alfie Lloyd	(England) Eastleigh	End of Season	
26 January 2023	CB	(Republic of Ireland) Conor Masterson	(England) Gillingham	End of Season	
27 January 2023	CB	(England) Henry Hawkins	(England) Beaconsfield Town	24 February 2023	
31 January 2023	LB	(Finland) Niko Hämäläinen	(Belgium) RWD Molenbeek	End of Season	
2 February 2023	RW	(England) Micah Anthony	(England) Hanwell Town	2 March 2023	
15 February 2023	RB	(England) Elijah Anthony	(England) Waltham Abbey	15 March 2023	
15 February 2023	CM	(England) Harun Hamid	(England) Kingstonian	15 March 2023	
15 February 2023	GK	(England) Matteo Salamon	(England) Hanwell Town	15 March 2023	
27 February 2023	GK	(England) Joe Walsh	(England) Maidenhead United	30 April 2023	
20 March 2023	DM	(England) Riley Cotter	(England) Coggeshall United	End of Season	
25 March 2023	CB	(England) Deon Woodman	(England) Dulwich Hamlet	End of Season	

== Friendlies ==
On 9 June QPR announced they would play two pre-season friendly games in Germany. A third friendly, back in the UK against Wealdstone was later confirmed. A fourth confirmed friendly followed four days later, against Crawley Town. The final confirmed friendly was announced on 4 July, against Crystal Palace.

During the 2022 FIFA World Cup winter break, the R's confirmed a friendly against Livingston.

Win Draw Loss Fixtures

2 July 2022 Friendly	Queens Park Rangers	2–0	Uxbridge	Heston
	Kelman 2'; Own goal 11'	Report		Stadium: Heston Sports Ground; Attendance: 0 (behind-closed-doors)

9 July 2022 Friendly	Crawley Town	3–3	Queens Park Rangers	Crawley
15:00 BST	Tilley 65'; Nichols 69' (pen.); Adebowale 82'	Report	Field 8'; Bonne 49', 58'	Stadium: Broadfield Stadium

13 July 2022 Friendly	Zwickau	0–4	Queens Park Rangers	Zwickau, Germany
17:00 BST		Report	Dykes 3'; Dozzell 11'; Johansen 36'; Chair 54'	Stadium: Stadion Zwickau

16 July 2022 Friendly	Hallescher FC	1–1	Queens Park Rangers	Halle, Germany
13:00 BST	Darner 1'	Report	Bonne 42'	Stadium: Leuna Chemie Stadion

20 July 2022 Friendly	Wealdstone	2–8	Queens Park Rangers	Ruislip
19:45 BST	Ferguson 52'; Trialist 55'	Report	Field 3'; Dykes 7', 32', 44' (pen.); Chair 39'; Paal 41'; Thomas 47'; Bonne 59'	Stadium: Grosvenor Vale; Attendance: 2,505

23 July 2022 Friendly	Queens Park Rangers	0–3	Crystal Palace	White City
15:00 BST		Report	Eze 28'; Zaha 51', 79' (pen.)	Stadium: Loftus Road

29 November 2022 Friendly	Queens Park Rangers	2–1	Livingston	White City
13:00 GMT	Armstrong 12'; Bonee 36'	Report	Nouble 70'	Stadium: Loftus Road Stadium; Attendance: 0 (behind-closed-doors)

== Competitions ==
=== Overall record ===
Competition	First match	Last match	Starting round	Record							
Competition	First match	Last match	Starting round	Pld	W	D	L	GF	GA	GD	Win %
Championship	30 July 2022	6 May 2023	Matchday 1	46	13	11	22	44	71	−27	28.26
FA Cup	7 January 2023	7 January 2023	Third round	1	0	0	1	1	2	−1	0.00
EFL Cup	9 August 2022	9 August 2022	First round	1	0	1	0	1	1	+0	0.00
Total				48	13	12	23	46	74	−28	27.08

Last updated: 8 May 2023
Source: [ Soccerway]

=== Sky Bet Championship ===
==== League table ====
Pos	Team	Pld	W	D	L	GF	GA	GD	Pts	Promotion, qualification or relegation
17	Birmingham City	46	14	11	21	47	58	−11	53	
18	Huddersfield Town	46	14	11	21	47	62	−15	53	
19	Rotherham United	46	11	17	18	49	60	−11	50	
20	Queens Park Rangers	46	13	11	22	44	71	−27	50	
21	Cardiff City	46	13	10	23	41	58	−17	49	
22	Reading (R)	46	13	11	22	46	68	−22	44 (Note: Reading were deducted 6 points for breaching an EFL business plan.)	Relegation to League One
23	Blackpool (R)	46	11	11	24	48	72	−24	44	Relegation to League One

Source: EFL Official Website
Rules for classification: 1) Points; 2) Goal difference; 3) Number of goals scored; 4) Head-to-head results; 5) Wins; 6) Away goals; 7) Penalty points (sec 9.5); 8) 12-point sending off offences
(R) Relegated

==== Results summary ====
Overall								Home						Away					
Pld	W	D	L	GF	GA	GD	Pts	W	D	L	GF	GA	GD	W	D	L	GF	GA	GD
46	13	11	22	44	71	−27	50	6	5	12	21	35	−14	7	6	10	23	36	−13

Last updated: 8 May 2023.
Source: [ Soccerway]

==== Results by round ====
Round	1	2	3	4	5	6	7	8	9	10	11	12	13	14	15	16	17	18	19	20	21	22	23	24	25	26	27	28	29	30	31	32	33	34	35	36	37	38	39	40	41	42	43	44	45	46
Ground	A	H	A	H	H	A	H	A	A	H	A	A	H	A	H	H	A	A	H	H	A	H	A	A	H	H	A	H	A	A	H	H	A	H	A	H	A	H	A	H	A	A	H	A	A	H
Result	L	W	D	L	D	W	W	L	W	D	W	W	W	L	W	W	L	D	L	L	L	L	W	D	L	D	D	D	L	D	L	L	L	L	L	W	L	L	L	L	D	L	D	W	W	L
Position	21	8	10	16	17	11	9	9	8	6	5	4	3	4	1	1	3	4	5	6	7	9	6	7	13	12	12	13	14	14	16	16	17	18	20	19	19	19	19	21	20	20	21	18	18	20

Updated to match(es) played on 8 May 2023. Source: [ Soccerway]
A = Away; H = Home; W = Win; D = Draw; L = Loss; P = Postponed

==== Matches ====
Win Draw Loss Fixtures

On 23 June, the league fixtures were announced.

30 July 2022 1	Blackburn Rovers	1–0	Queens Park Rangers	Blackburn
15:00 BST	Buckley (yellow card) 11'; Travis 34'	Report	Dykes (yellow card) 12'	Stadium: Ewood Park; Attendance: 14,315; Referee: Thomas Bramall

6 August 2022 2	Queens Park Rangers	3–2	Middlesbrough	Shepherd's Bush
15:00 BST	Willock 13'; Dunne 27'; Dykes 38'; Johansen (yellow card) 77'; Kakay (yellow card) 90+1'	Report	Forss (yellow card) 17', (goal) 56'; Crooks 41'; Bola (yellow card) 73'; Lenihan (red card) 90+2'	Stadium: Loftus Road Stadium; Attendance: 15,796; Referee: Josh Smith

13 August 2022 3	Sunderland	2–2	Queens Park Rangers	Sunderland
15:00 BST	Clarke (yellow card) 26'; Stewart 31'; Simms 40'; Evans (yellow card) 41'; Gooch (yellow card) 85'	Report	Field (yellow card) 30'; Dickie (yellow card) 38'; Chair 87'; Dieng 90+2'	Stadium: Stadium of Light; Attendance: 37,884; Referee: Jeremy Simpson

16 August 2022 4	Queens Park Rangers	0–1	Blackpool	Shepherd's Bush
20:00 BST	Dunne (yellow card) 89'	Report	Thompson (yellow card) 37'; Bowler 45+1'; Ekpiteta (yellow card) 69'	Stadium: Loftus Road Stadium; Attendance: 12,575; Referee: Andy Davies

20 August 2022 5	Queens Park Rangers	1–1	Rotherham United	Shepherd's Bush
15:00 BST	Dickie (yellow card) 29'; Willock 43'; Dozzell (yellow card) 64'; Field (yellow card) 74'	Report	Ogbene 33'; Humphreys (yellow card) 64'; Johansson (yellow card) 90+5'	Stadium: Loftus Road Stadium; Attendance: 12,230; Referee: Andy Woolmer

27 August 2022 6	Watford	2–3	Queens Park Rangers	Watford
15:00 BST	Sema 27'; Pedro (yellow card) 40', (goal) 50'; Kayembe (yellow card) 45+4'; Kamara (yellow card) 84'; Kabasele (yellow card) 90'	Report	Chair 18'; Willock 34'; Johansen (yellow card) 44'; Adomah 70'; Dieng (yellow card) 81'; Dozzell (yellow card) 85'	Stadium: Vicarage Road; Attendance: 19,977; Referee: Keith Stroud

30 August 2022 7	Queens Park Rangers	3–1	Hull City	Shepherd's Bush
19:45 BST	Chair 10'; Laird 15'; Willock 40'; Roberts (yellow card) 90+4'	Report	Greaves (yellow card) 83'; Smith 85'	Stadium: Loftus Road Stadium; Attendance: 12,716; Referee: Steve Martin

3 September 2022 8	Swansea City	1–0	Queens Park Rangers	Swansea
15:00 BST	Piroe 21', (yellow card) 77'; Grimes (yellow card) 34'; Paterson (yellow card) 39'	Report		Stadium: Swansea.com Stadium; Attendance: 15,935; Referee: Oliver Langford

14 September 2022 9	Millwall	0–2	Queens Park Rangers	Bermondsey
19:45 BST		Report	Willock 54'; Johansen 71'	Stadium: The Den; Attendance: 13,384; Referee: Tim Robinson

17 September 2022 10	Queens Park Rangers	0–0	Stoke City	Shepherd's Bush
15:00 BST	Balogun (yellow card) 90'	Report	Taylor (yellow card) 87'; Bursik (yellow card) 90+1'	Stadium: Loftus Road Stadium; Attendance: 14,174; Referee: Matt Donohue

1 October 2022 11	Bristol City	1–2	Queens Park Rangers	Ashton Gate
15:00 BST	Williams (yellow card) 53'; Wells 61'; Massengo (yellow card) 76'; Scott (yellow card) 90+5'	Report	Johansen 19'; Roberts 22'; Amos (yellow card) 86'	Stadium: Ashton Gate; Attendance: 21,665; Referee: Jeremy Simpson

4 October 2022 12	Sheffield United	0–1	Queens Park Rangers	Sheffield
19:45 BST	Egan (yellow card) 22'	Report	Willock 51'; Balogun (yellow card) 76'; Dunne (yellow card) 82'	Stadium: Bramall Lane; Attendance: 26,636; Referee: James Linington

7 October 2022 13	Queens Park Rangers	2–1	Reading	Shepherd's Bush
20:00 BST	Dykes 33' 84' (pen.); Iroegbunam (yellow card) 53'; Amos (yellow card) 90+4'	Report	Hutchinson (yellow card) 25'; Carroll 30' (pen.) (yellow card) 45'; Holmes (yellow card) 83'	Stadium: Loftus Road Stadium; Attendance: 16,656; Referee: Thomas Bramall

15 October 2022 14	Luton Town	3–1	Queens Park Rangers	Luton
15:00 BST	Adebayo 18'; Clark (yellow card) 44'; Lansbury (yellow card) 54'; Dunne 77' (o.g.); Freeman 90+3'	Report	Horvath 90+1' (o.g.)	Stadium: Kenilworth Road; Attendance: 10,011; Referee: Tony Harrington

19 October 2022 15	Queens Park Rangers	3–0	Cardiff City	Shepherd's Bush
19:45 BST	Dykes 19' (pen.) 33'; Johansen (yellow card) 26'; Paal 74' (yellow card) 79'	Report	Ng (yellow card) 1'; Simpson (red card) 18'; Nelson (yellow card) 28'; Nkounkou (yellow card) 54'; Wintle (yellow card) 70'; Harris (yellow card) 73'	Stadium: Loftus Road Stadium; Attendance: 12,805; Referee: James Linington

22 October 2022 16	Queens Park Rangers	2–1	Wigan Athletic	Shepherd's Bush
15:00 BST	Field 12'; Balogun 24'; Richards (yellow card) 90+3'	Report	Tilt (yellow card) 18'; Broadhead 22'; Shinnie (yellow card) 90+6'	Stadium: Loftus Road Stadium; Attendance: 16,353; Referee: Dean Whitestone

28 October 2022 17	Birmingham City	2–0	Queens Park Rangers	Bordesley
20:00 BST	Trusty 4' (yellow card) 35'; Mejbri (yellow card) 7'; Longelo 29' (yellow card) 78'; Bielik (yellow card) 55'	Report	Dickie (yellow card) 53'; Balogun (yellow card) 60'; Iroegbunam (yellow card) 70'; Dykes (penalty missed) 79'	Stadium: St Andrew's Stadium; Attendance: 19,007; Referee: Tim Robinson

2 November 2022 18	Norwich City	0–0	Queens Park Rangers	Norwich
19:45 GMT	Byram (yellow card) 31'	Report	Iroegbunam (yellow card) 1'; Field (yellow card) 48'; Dykes (yellow card) 75'	Stadium: Carrow Road; Attendance: 25,458; Referee: Andy Davies

5 November 2022 19	Queens Park Rangers	0–1	West Bromwich Albion	Shepherd's Bush
15:00 GMT	Field (yellow card) 68'	Report	Pieters (yellow card) 16'; Bartley 68'; Molumby (yellow card) 90+1'	Stadium: Loftus Road Stadium; Attendance: 17,139; Referee: Thomas Bramall

8 November 2022 20	Queens Park Rangers	1–2	Huddersfield Town	Shepherd's Bush
19:45 GMT	Dykes 2'	Report	Ruffels 9', 26'; Diarra (yellow card) 40'; Spencer (yellow card) 44'; Ward (yellow card) 75'; Thomas (yellow card) 89'; Nicholls (yellow card) 90+1'; Rhodes (yellow card) 90+5'	Stadium: Loftus Road Stadium; Attendance: 12,769; Referee: Gavin Ward

12 November 2022 21	Coventry City	2–0	Queens Park Rangers	Coventry
15:00 GMT	Gyökeres 11', 78'; Doyle (yellow card) 27'; McFadzean (yellow card) 86'	Report	Field (yellow card) 65'; Chair (yellow card) 76'	Stadium: The Coventry Building Society Arena; Attendance: 23,201; Referee: Keith Stroud

11 December 2022 22	Queens Park Rangers	0–3	Burnley	Shepherd's Bush
13:00 GMT	Iroegbunam (yellow card) 56'	Report	Guðmundsson 19'; Maatsen 45+2'; Cork (yellow card) 52'; Tella 71'; Cullen (yellow card) 90+2'	Stadium: Loftus Road Stadium; Attendance: 14,299; Referee: Peter Bankes

17 December 2022 23	Preston North End	0–1	Queens Park Rangers	Preston
15:00 GMT	Lindsay (yellow card) 74'	Report	Dozzell (yellow card) 3'; Dykes (yellow card) 27'; Dunne 58'; Dieng (yellow card) 77'	Stadium: Deepdale; Attendance: 14,534; Referee: Oliver Langford

26 December 2022 24	Cardiff City	0–0	Queens Park Rangers	Cardiff
17:15 GMT	Wintle (yellow card) 32'; Romeo (yellow card) 85'	Report	Iroegbunam (yellow card) 4'; Laird (yellow card) 59'; Roberts (yellow card) 86'	Stadium: Cardiff City Stadium; Attendance: 18,549; Referee: Keith Stroud

29 December 2022 25	Queens Park Rangers	0–3	Luton Town	Shepherd's Bush
15:00 GMT		Report	Morris 10', 47'; Doughty (yellow card) 43'; Clark (yellow card) 67'; Daniel Potts (yellow card) 72'; Mpanzu (yellow card) 72'; Doughty 81'	Stadium: Loftus Road Stadium; Attendance: 16,030; Referee: Gavin Ward

2 January 2023 26	Queens Park Rangers	1–1	Sheffield United	Shepherd's Bush
20:00 GMT	Chair 11'; Field (yellow card) 57'; Dunne (yellow card) 86'	Report	Foderingham (yellow card) 39'; Jebbison (yellow card) 90+2'; Egan 90+6'	Stadium: Loftus Road Stadium; Attendance: 14,151; Referee: Josh Smith

14 January 2023 27	Reading	2–2	Queens Park Rangers	Reading
15:00 GMT	Hendrick 28', 42'; Rahman (yellow card) 41'; Yiadom (yellow card) 72'	Report	Dickie (yellow card) 27'; Roberts 66', 80'; Richards (yellow card) 87'	Stadium: The Select Car Leasing Stadium; Attendance: 14,186; Referee: Darren Bond

21 January 2023 28	Queens Park Rangers	1–1	Swansea City	Shepherd's Bush
15:00 GMT	Lowe 27'	Report	Fulton 81'	Stadium: Loftus Road Stadium; Attendance: 16,110; Referee: John Busby

28 January 2023 29	Hull City	3–0	Queens Park Rangers	Kingston upon Hull
15:00 GMT	Connolly 10', 64'; Dickie 62' (o.g.)	Report	Lowe (yellow card) 20'; Iroegbunam (yellow card) 40'; Armstrong (yellow card) 67'; Dunne (yellow card) 90+1'	Stadium: MKM Stadium; Attendance: 16,418; Referee: James Linington

4 February 2023 30	Huddersfield Town	1–1	Queens Park Rangers	Huddersfield
15:00 GMT	Waghorn 39'; Hogg (yellow card) 41'; Rudoni (yellow card) 90+4'	Report	Lowe 13'; Clarke-Salter (yellow card) 37'; Adomah (yellow card) 72'	Stadium: John Smith's Stadium; Attendance: 17,954; Referee: Geoff Eltringham

11 February 2023 31	Queens Park Rangers	1–2	Millwall	Shepherd's Bush
15:00 GMT	Armstrong (yellow card) 68'; Martin 82'	Report	Watmore 31'; Burke 78'; Honeyman (yellow card) 80'	Stadium: Loftus Road Stadium; Attendance: 15,335; Referee: Dean Whitestone

14 February 2023 32	Queens Park Rangers	0–3	Sunderland	Shepherd's Bush
19:45 GMT	Field (yellow card) 63'; Chair (penalty missed) 67'; Lowe (yellow card) 71'; Dozzell (yellow card) 72'; Johansen (yellow card) 82'; Paal (yellow card) 90'; Dunne (yellow card) 90+1'	Report	O'Nien 34'; Clarke (yellow card) 69', (goal) 82', 90+2'; Roberts (yellow card) 90+1'	Stadium: Loftus Road Stadium; Attendance: 14,471; Referee: Peter Bankes

18 February 2023 33	Middlesbrough	3–1	Queens Park Rangers	Middlesbrough
15:00 GMT	Akpom 64', (yellow card) 65', (penalty missed) 77', 77'; McGree 90+2'	Report	Chair 89'	Stadium: Riverside Stadium; Attendance: 27,456; Referee: David Webb

25 February 2023 34	Queens Park Rangers	1–3	Blackburn Rovers	Shepherd's Bush
15:00 GMT	Iroegbunam 24'; Johansen (yellow card) 37'; Kakay (yellow card) 57'; Field (yellow card) 59'; Lowe (yellow card) 66'	Report	Gallagher 14', 60'; Szmodics 45+2'	Stadium: Loftus Road Stadium; Attendance: 15,715; Referee: Leigh Doughty

5 March 2023 35	Rotherham United	3–1	Queens Park Rangers	Rotherham
15:00 GMT	Hugill 15', (yellow card) 34', (goal) 70' (pen.); Harding (yellow card) 82'; Odoffin 90'	Report	Adomah (yellow card) 42'; Field (yellow card) 49'; Dickie (yellow card) 69'; Lowe 83' (pen.)	Stadium: AESSEAL New York Stadium; Attendance: 10,563; Referee: Darren Bond

11 March 2023 36	Queens Park Rangers	1–0	Watford	Shepherd's Bush
15:00 GMT	Iroegbunam 15', (yellow card) 61'; Lowe (yellow card) 44'	Report	Choudhury (yellow card) 45+1'; Hoedt (yellow card) 90+6'	Stadium: Loftus Road Stadium; Attendance: 17,247; Referee: James Linington

14 March 2023 37	Blackpool	6–1	Queens Park Rangers	Blackpool
19:45 GMT	Yates 3' (pen.), (yellow card) 65'; Lyons 11', 48'; Nelson 14'; Thorniley 36'; Dougall 88'	Report	Martin 43'; Dunne (yellow card) 44'; Amos (yellow card) 75'; Dickie (yellow card) 87'	Stadium: Bloomfield Road; Attendance: 10,051; Referee: Jeremy Simpson

18 March 2023 38	Queens Park Rangers	0–1	Birmingham City	Shepherd's Bush
15:00 GMT	Field (yellow card) 22'; Amos (yellow card) 56'; Armstrong (yellow card) 90+6'; Johansen (yellow card) 90+7'	Report	Chong 3'; Ruddy (yellow card) 78'; Trusty (yellow card) 81'; Long (yellow card) 90+6'	Stadium: Loftus Road; Attendance: 15,097; Referee: Keith Stroud

1 April 2023 39	Wigan Athletic	1–0	Queens Park Rangers	Wigan
15:00 BST	Power 6' (pen.), (yellow card) 81'; Rekik (yellow card) 90+3'	Report	Laird (yellow card) 19'; Dickie (yellow card) 50'	Stadium: DW Stadium; Attendance: 12,608; Referee: Gavin Ward

7 April 2023 40	Queens Park Rangers	0–2	Preston North End	Shepherd's Bush
15:00 BST		Report	Cannon 59', 63'; Woodman (yellow card) 78'	Stadium: Loftus Road Stadium; Attendance: 14,620; Referee: Geoff Eltringham

10 April 2023 41	West Bromwich Albion	2–2	Queens Park Rangers	West Bromwich
15:00 BST	Thomas-Asante 10'; Ajayi 13'	Report	Dykes 22'; Martin 49'; Lowe (yellow card) 81'	Stadium: The Hawthorns; Attendance: 23,969; Referee: Matt Donohue

15 April 2023 42	Queens Park Rangers	0–3	Coventry City	Shepherd's Bush
15:00 BST	Balogun (yellow card) 54'	Report	Gyökeres 10', 88'; McFadzean (yellow card) 34'; Eccles (yellow card) 45+3'; Doyle (yellow card) 52'; Hamer 86'	Stadium: Loftus Road Stadium; Attendance: 16,713; Referee: Michael Salisbury

19 April 2023 43	Queens Park Rangers	1–1	Norwich City	Shepherd's Bush
19:45 BST	Dykes 9', (yellow card) 30'; Dunne (yellow card) 41'; Chair (yellow card) 55'; Martin (yellow card) 76'; Amos (yellow card) 90+3'; Gareth Ainsworth (yellow card) off the pitch'	Report	Omobamidele (yellow card) 19'; Hernández (yellow card) 22'; Idah 46'; David Wagner (yellow card) off the pitch'	Stadium: Loftus Road Stadium; Attendance: 14,132; Referee: Keith Stroud

22 April 2023 44	Burnley	1–2	Queens Park Rangers	Burnley
15:00 BST	Harwood-Bellis (yellow card) 81'; Benson 76'; Twine (yellow card) 90+2'	Report	Field 58'; Armstrong (yellow card) 80'; Martin 87'; Laird (yellow card) 89'	Stadium: Turf Moor; Attendance: 20,027; Referee: Dean Whitestone

29 April 2023 45	Stoke City	0–1	Queens Park Rangers	Stoke-on-Trent
15:00 BST	Campbell (yellow card) 75'	Report	Laird (yellow card) 20'; Adomah 48'; Field (yellow card) 53'; Amos (yellow card) 90+7'	Stadium: Bet365 Stadium; Attendance: 22,486; Referee: Leigh Doughty

8 May 2023 46	Queens Park Rangers	0–2	Bristol City	Shepherd's Bush
15:00 BST		Report	Vyner (yellow card) 15'; Sykes 28'; Bell 55'; Amos (yellow card) 90+7'	Stadium: Loftus Road Stadium; Attendance: 17,335; Referee: Andy Woolmer

=== Emirates FA Cup ===
The R's were drawn away to Fleetwood Town in the round third.

Win Draw Loss Fixtures

7 January 2023 Third round	Fleetwood Town (League One)	2–1	Queens Park Rangers	Fleetwood
15:00 GMT	Nsiala 40'; Omochere 67'; Vela (yellow card) 73'	Report	Field 37'; Kakay (yellow card) 65'	Stadium: Highbury Stadium; Attendance: 3,151; Referee: Stephen Martin

=== Carabao Cup ===
Win Draw Loss Fixtures

QPR were drawn away to Charlton Athletic in the first round.

9 August 2022 First round	Charlton Athletic (League One)	1–1 (5–3 p)	Queens Park Rangers	Charlton
19:45 BST	Clare (yellow card) 16'; Henry 90'	Report	Field (yellow card) 35'; Roberts 80'	Stadium: The Valley; Attendance: 5,629; Referee: Stuart Attwell
	Penalties
	Stockley (penalty scored); Kirk (penalty scored); Morgan (penalty scored); Henry (penalty scored); O'Connell (penalty scored)		Johansen (penalty missed); Roberts (penalty scored); Shodipo (penalty scored); Dozzell (penalty scored)

== Squad statistics ==
=== Statistics ===
As of 8 May 2023

No.	Pos	Nat	Player	Total		Sky Bet Championship		Carabao Cup		Emirates FA Cup	
No.	Pos	Nat	Player	Apps	Goals	Apps	Goals	Apps	Goals	Apps	Goals
1	GK	(Senegal) SEN	Seny Dieng	46	1	44	1	1	0	1	0
2	DF	(Sierra Leone) SLE	Osman Kakay	23	0	11+10	0	1	0	1	0
3	DF	(Republic of Ireland) IRL	Jimmy Dunne	41	2	37+2	2	1	0	1	0
4	DF	(England) ENG	Rob Dickie	40	0	32+6	0	1	0	1	0
5	DF	(England) ENG	Jake Clarke-Salter	16	0	13+3	0	0	0	0	0
6	MF	(Norway) NOR	Stefan Johansen	29	2	20+8	2	0+1	0	0	0
7	FW	(England) ENG	Chris Willock	29	6	20+8	6	0	0	1	0
8	MF	(England) ENG	Luke Amos	21	0	8+13	0	0	0	0	0
9	FW	(Scotland) SCO	Lyndon Dykes	40	8	35+4	8	0	0	1	0
10	MF	(Morocco) MAR	Ilias Chair	36	5	32+2	5	1	0	1	0
11	FW	(Wales) WAL	Tyler Roberts	20	4	14+4	3	0+1	1	0+1	0
13	GK	(Scotland) SCO	Jordan Archer	0	0	0	0	0	0	0	0
14	FW	(Scotland) SCO	Chris Martin	16	4	12+4	4	0	0	0	0
15	MF	(England) ENG	Sam Field	48	3	46	2	1	0	1	1
16	MF	(Finland) FIN	Niko Hämäläinen	4	0	1+1	0	1	0	1	0
17	MF	(England) ENG	Andre Dozzell	38	0	19+17	0	1	0	1	0
18	FW	(Jamaica) JAM	Jamal Lowe	20	3	14+6	3	0	0	0	0
19	MF	(England) ENG	Elijah Dixon-Bonner	1	0	0+1	0	0	0	0	0
20	MF	(England) ENG	Taylor Richards	16	0	1+14	0	0	0	0+1	0
22	DF	(Suriname) SUR	Kenneth Paal	41	1	40	1	0	0	0+1	0
23	DF	(Republic of Ireland) IRL	Conor Masterson	1	0	0+1	0	0	0	0	0
24	MF	(Northern Ireland) NIR	Charlie Owens	0	0	0	0	0	0	0	0
25	MF	(Republic of Ireland) IRL	Olamide Shodipo	12	0	3+8	0	0+1	0	0	0
26	DF	(Nigeria) NGR	Leon Balogun	15	1	14+1	1	0	0	0	0
27	DF	(England) ENG	Ethan Laird	31	1	28+2	1	0	0	0+1	0
29	DF	(England) ENG	Aaron Drewe	8	0	5+2	0	0+1	0	0	0
30	FW	(Republic of Ireland) IRL	Sinclair Armstrong	24	0	3+19	0	0+1	0	0+1	0
32	GK	(England) ENG	Joe Walsh	0	0	0	0	0	0	0	0
37	MF	(Ghana) GHA	Albert Adomah	40	2	12+26	2	1	0	1	0
38	GK	(England) ENG	Murphy Mahoney	0	0	0	0	0	0	0	0
47	MF	(England) ENG	Tim Iroegbunam	32	2	28+4	2	0	0	0	0
Left During the Season
14	MF	(Wales) WAL	George Thomas	4	0	1+2	0	1	0	0	0
18	FW	(Zimbabwe) ZIM	Macauley Bonne	9	0	0+8	0	1	0	0	0

=== Goals ===
As of 28 May 2023

Rank	Player	Position	Championship	FA Cup	EFL Cup	Total
1	(Scotland) Lyndon Dykes	FW	8	0	0	8
2	(England) Chris Willock	MF	6	0	0	6
3	(Morocco) Ilias Chair	MF	5	0	0	5
4	(Wales) Tyler Roberts	FW	3	0	1	4
4	(Scotland) Chris Martin	FW	4	0	0	4
5	(England) Sam Field	MF	2	1	0	3
6	(Jamaica) Jamal Lowe	FW	3	0	0	3
6	(Ghana) Albert Adomah	MF	2	0	0	2
6	(England) Tim Iroegbunam	MF	2	0	0	2
6	(Norway) Stefan Johansen	MF	2	0	0	2
6	(Republic of Ireland) Jimmy Dunne	DF	2	0	0	2
11	(Senegal) Seny Dieng	GK	1	0	0	1
11	(England) Ethan Laird	DF	1	0	0	1
11	(Nigeria) Leon Balogun	DF	1	0	0	1
11	(Suriname) Kenneth Paal	DF	1	0	0	1
Own goal			1	0	0	1
Total			44	1	1	46

=== Clean sheets ===
As of 8 May 2023

Rank	Player	Position	Championship	FA Cup	EFL Cup	Total
1	(Senegal) Seny Dieng	GK	9	0	0	9
Total			9	0	0	9
