= Joe Walsh (footballer, born 2002) =

English footballer

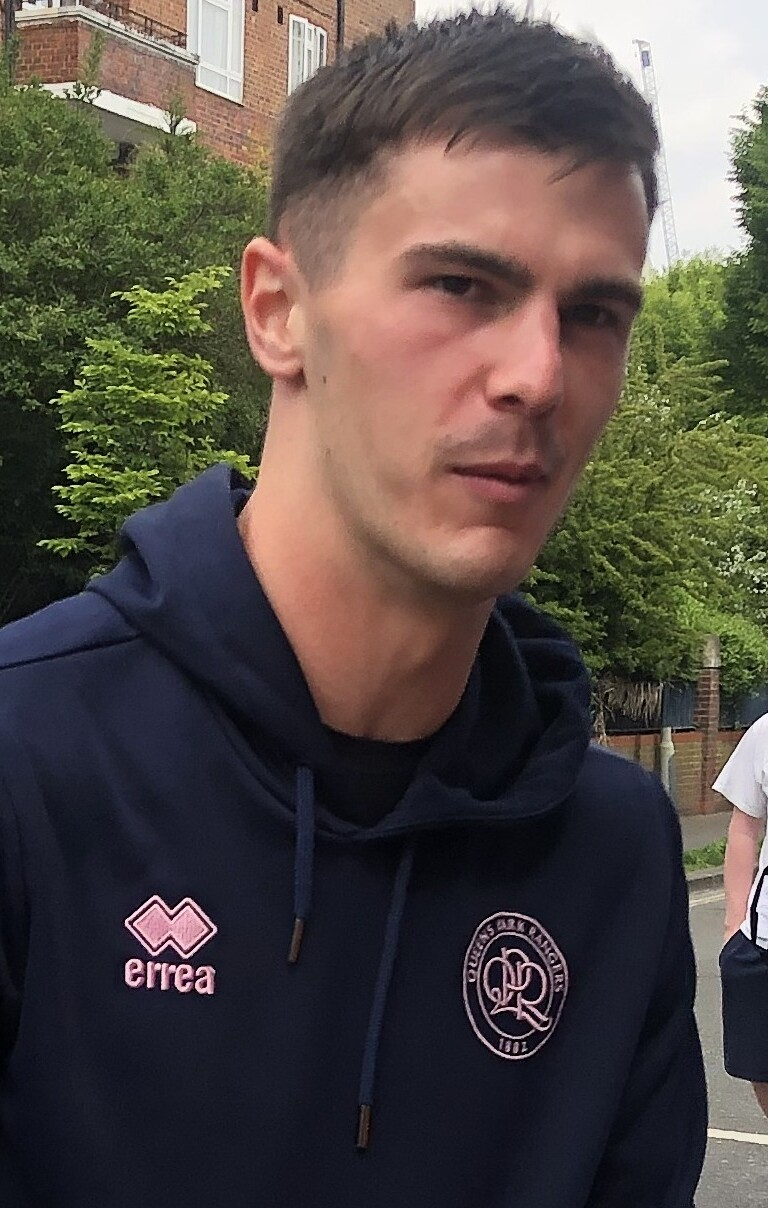
- Walsh in 2025

Personal information
- Full name: Joe Anthony Walsh
- Date of birth: 1 April 2002 (age 24)
- Place of birth: Medway, England
- Height: 1.91 m (6 ft 3 in)
- Position: Goalkeeper

Team information
- Current team: Wigan Athletic (on loan from Queens Park Rangers)
- Number: 1

Youth career
- Gillingham

Senior career*
Years	Team	Apps	(Gls)
2019–2021	Gillingham	1	(0)
2021–	Queens Park Rangers	25	(0)
2022	→ Hampton & Richmond Borough (loan)	10	(0)
2022	→ Dorking Wanderers (loan)	6	(0)
2023	→ Maidenhead United (loan)	2	(0)
2023–2024	→ Accrington Stanley (loan)	7	(0)
2026–	→ Wigan Athletic (loan)	3	(0)
- * Club domestic league appearances and goals as of 03:02, 2 October 2026 (UTC)

Joe Anthony Walsh (born 1 April 2002) is an English professional footballer who plays as a goalkeeper for EFL League One club Wigan Athletic on loan from EFL Championship club Queens Park Rangers.

== Career ==
=== Gillingham ===
From Medway, Kent, Walsh joined local club Gillingham aged 11, signing a scholarship with the club in late 2017. In May 2019, Walsh signed a professional contract with Gillingham. On 3 September 2019, Walsh made his debut for Gillingham in a 3–2 EFL Trophy defeat against Colchester United. He made his English Football League debut on 27 October 2020 when he came on as a substitute for the injured Jack Bonham against Ipswich Town.

=== Queens Park Rangers ===
On 28 January 2021, Walsh joined Queens Park Rangers for an undisclosed fee, signing a three-and-a-half-year contract that would initially see him join up with the club's under-23s team.

On 16 September 2022, Walsh signed for National League South club Hampton & Richmond Borough on a one-month loan deal. On 17 November 2022, Walsh joined National League club Dorking Wanderers on loan until 7 January 2023. In February 2023 he joined Maidenhead United on loan until the end of the season.

Walsh made his first team debut for QPR coming on as a half time substitute for injured keeper Jordan Archer in an EFL Cup game against Norwich City on 16 August 2023.

On 7 December 2023, Walsh joined League Two side Accrington Stanley on an emergency seven-day loan. Two days later, he made his debut, keeping a clean sheet in a 0–0 draw with Doncaster Rovers. The loan was then extended by a further seven days. On 22 December, it was extended by another seven days. The following week, it was extended once more. On 9 January 2024, the loan move was extended for another seven days. On 18 January 2024, Walsh returned to Queens Park Rangers after making a total of nine appearances.

On 4 May 2024, Walsh made his first league appearance for QPR, starting in a 2-1 win away at Coventry City. He signed a new contract the following month.

On 9 July 2026, he joined EFL League One side Wigan Athletic on a season-long loan.

== Career statistics ==
As of match played 22 September 2026

Appearances and goals by club, season and competition
Club	Season	League			FA Cup		League Cup		Other		Total	
Club	Season	Division	Apps	Goals	Apps	Goals	Apps	Goals	Apps	Goals	Apps	Goals
Gillingham	2019–20	League One	0	0	0	0	0	0	3 (Note: Appearance(s) in EFL Trophy)	0	3	0
Gillingham	2020–21	League One	1	0	0	0	1	0	3	0	5	0
Gillingham	Total		1	0	0	0	1	0	6	0	8	0
Queens Park Rangers	2020–21	Championship	0	0	0	0	0	0	—		0	0
Queens Park Rangers	2021–22	Championship	0	0	0	0	0	0	—		0	0
Queens Park Rangers	2022–23	Championship	0	0	0	0	0	0	—		0	0
Queens Park Rangers	2023–24	Championship	1	0	0	0	1	0	—		2	0
Queens Park Rangers	2024–25	Championship	1	0	1	0	3	0	—		5	0
Queens Park Rangers	2025–26	Championship	23	0	1	0	0	0	—		24	0
Queens Park Rangers	2026–27	Championship	0	0	—		—		—		0	0
Queens Park Rangers	Total		25	0	2	0	4	0	0	0	31	0
Hampton & Richmond Borough (loan)	2022–23	National League South	10	0	0	0	—		—		10	0
Dorking Wanderers (loan)	2022–23	National League	6	0	0	0	—		—		6	0
Maidenhead United (loan)	2022–23	National League	2	0	0	0	—		—		2	0
Accrington Stanley (loan)	2023–24	League Two	7	0	0	0	0	0	2	0	9	0
Wigan Athletic (loan)	2026–27	League One	3	0	0	0	1	0	2	0	6	0
Career total			54	0	2	0	6	0	10	0	72	0
