= 2021–22 Queens Park Rangers F.C. season =

English football club season

Queens Park Rangers
2021–22 season
- Chairman: Amit Bhatia
- Manager: Mark Warburton
- Stadium: Loftus Road
- EFL Championship: 11th
- FA Cup: Fourth round
- League Cup: Fourth round
- Top goalscorer: League: Andre Gray (10); All: Andre Gray (10)
- Highest home attendance: 17,648 vs. Fulham (2 April, Championship)
- Lowest home attendance: 11,591 vs. Huddersfield Town (24 November, Championship)
- Average home league attendance: 14,437
- Biggest win: 4–0 vs. Reading (29 January, Championship)
- Biggest defeat: 1–4 vs. Fulham (16 October, Championship)
Home colours	Away colours	Third colours

The 2021–22 Queens Park Rangers F.C. season was the 140th edition of Queens Park Rangers F.C. existence and the club's 7th consecutive season in the second division of English football. In addition to the domestic league, they contested in the FA Cup, and the EFL Cup.

== Players ==
=== First team squad ===
As of 12 May 2022

No.	Name	Nat	Position	Since	Date of birth (age)	Signed from	Contract Expires	Games	Goals
Goalkeepers
1	Seny Dieng	(Senegal)	GK	2016	23 November 1994 (age 31)	(Germany) MSV Duisburg	2024	73	0
13	Jordan Archer	(Scotland)	GK	2021	12 April 1993 (age 33)	(England) Middlesbrough	2023	3	0
25	David Marshall	(Scotland)	GK	2022	5 March 1985 (age 41)	(England) Derby County	2022	12	0
29	Keiren Westwood	(Republic of Ireland)	GK	2022	23 October 1984 (age 41)	(Republic of Ireland) Sheffield Wednesday	2022	6	0
32	Joe Walsh	(England)	GK	2021	1 April 2002 (age 24)	(England) Gillingham	2024	0	0
33	Dillon Barnes	(Jamaica)	GK	2019	8 April 1996 (age 30)	(England) Colchester United	2022	0	0
38	Murphy Mahoney	(England)	GK	2012	27 December 2001 (age 24)	(England) Wycombe Wanderers	2022	2	0
Defenders
2	Osman Kakay	(Sierra Leone)	RB	2015	25 August 1997 (age 29)	(England) Queens Park Rangers Academy	2024	65	2
3	Lee Wallace	(Scotland)	LB	2019	1 August 1987 (age 39)	(Scotland) Rangers	2022	63	2
4	Rob Dickie	(England)	CB	2020	3 March 1996 (age 30)	(England) Oxford United	2024	89	8
5	Jordy de Wijs	(Netherlands)	CB	2021	8 January 1995 (age 31)	(England) Hull City	2024	22	1
6	Yoann Barbet	(France)	CB	2019	10 May 1993 (age 33)	(England) Brentford	2022	121	4
16	Sam McCallum	(England)	LB	2021	2 September 2000 (age 26)	(England) Norwich City	Loan	19	2
20	Jimmy Dunne	(Republic of Ireland)	CB	2021	19 October 1997 (age 28)	(England) Burnley	2024	43	3
22	Moses Odubajo	(England)	RB/LB	2021	28 July 1993 (age 33)	(England) Sheffield Wednesday	2022	33	0
28	Dion Sanderson	(England)	CB	2012	15 December 1999 (age 26)	(England) Wolves	Loan	12	0
39	Joe Gubbins	(England)	CB	2017	3 August 2001 (age 25)	(England) Southampton	2023	3	0
41	Aaron Drewe	(England)	CB	2010	8 February 2001 (age 25)	(England) Queens Park Rangers Academy	2022	1	0
Midfielders
7	Stefan Johansen (captain)	(Norway)	CM/AM/DM	2021	8 January 1991 (age 35)	(England) Fulham	2024	58	5
8	Luke Amos	(England)	CM/DM	2019	23 February 1997 (age 29)	(England) Tottenham Hotspur	2023	74	8
10	Ilias Chair	(Morocco)	AM/RM/LM	2017	30 October 1997 (age 28)	(Belgium) Lierse	2023	150	23
12	Dominic Ball	(England)	DM/CB/CM	2019	2 August 1995 (age 31)	(England) Rotherham United	2022	99	2
14	George Thomas	(Wales)	AM/CM	2020	24 March 1997 (age 29)	(England) Leicester City	2023	42	0
15	Sam Field	(England)	CM	2021	8 May 1998 (age 28)	(England) West Bromwich Albion	2024	49	1
17	Andre Dozzell	(England)	CM/AM/DM	2021	2 May 1999 (age 27)	(England) Ipswich Town	2024	33	0
21	Chris Willock	(England)	LM/RM	2020	31 January 1998 (age 28)	(Portugal) Benfica	2023	76	10
24	Charlie Owens	(Northern Ireland)	CM/DM	2017	7 December 1997 (age 28)	(England) Tottenham Hotspur	2021	3	0
27	Jeff Hendrick	(Republic of Ireland)	CM	2022	31 January 1992 (age 34)	(England) Newcastle United	Loan	11	0
34	Stephen Duke-McKenna	(Guyana)	RM/CM	2019	17 August 2000 (age 26)	(England) Bolton Wanderers	2021	4	0
37	Albert Adomah	(Ghana)	RM	2020	13 December 1987 (age 38)	(England) Nottingham Forest	2022	72	4
Forwards
9	Lyndon Dykes	(Scotland)	CF	2020	7 October 1995 (age 30)	(Scotland) Livingston	2024	80	21
11	Charlie Austin	(England)	CF	2021	5 July 1989 (age 37)	(England) West Bromwich Albion	2023	148	63
19	Andre Gray	(Jamaica)	CF	2021	26 June 1991 (age 35)	(England) Watford	Loan	30	10
40	Ody Alfa	(Nigeria)	CF	2013	9 March 1999 (age 27)	(England) Queens Park Rangers Academy	2023	1	0
–	Marco Ramkilde	(Denmark)	CF	2020	9 May 1998 (age 28)	(Denmark) AaB Fodbold	2022	1	0

== Kit ==
Supplier: Erreà / Sponsor: Ashville Holdings

Home	Away

=== Kit information ===
QPR agreed a multi-year partnership with Erreà as the official technical kit suppliers, the 2021–22 season will be the fifth year of the deal. The kits will be 100 per cent bespoke designs for the duration of the deal.

On 16 July 2021 QPR announced Ashville Holdings as the main shirt sponsor for the 2021–22 season on a one-year deal.

== Transfers ==
=== Transfers in ===
Date	Position	Nationality	Name	From	Fee	Ref.
11 May 2021	CF	(England)	Alfie Lloyd	(England) Yeovil Town	Undisclosed	
13 May 2021	CB	(Netherlands)	Jordy de Wijs	(England) Hull City	Undisclosed	
20 May 2021	CM	(England)	Sam Field	(England) West Bromwich Albion	Undisclosed	
2 June 2021	CF	(England)	Charlie Austin	(England) West Bromwich Albion	Free transfer	
15 June 2021	CM	(England)	Andre Dozzell	(England) Ipswich Town	Undisclosed	
6 July 2021	CF	(England)	Sean Adarkwa	(England) West Ham United	Free transfer	
7 July 2021	GK	(Scotland)	Jordan Archer	(England) Middlesbrough	Free transfer	
13 July 2021	CB	(Republic of Ireland)	Jimmy Dunne	(England) Burnley	Undisclosed	
24 July 2021	CM	(Norway)	Stefan Johansen	(England) Fulham	Undisclosed	
30 July 2021	RB	(England)	Moses Odubajo	(England) Sheffield Wednesday	Free transfer	
27 August 2021	RW	(England)	Joseph Ajose	(England) Reading	Free transfer	
7 September 2021	AM	(Portugal)	Brandon Aveiro	(England) Crystal Palace	Free transfer	
11 January 2022	GK	(Republic of Ireland)	Harry Halwax	(Republic of Ireland) Cabinteely	Free transfer	
11 January 2022	GK	(Scotland)	David Marshall	(England) Derby County	Free transfer	
17 January 2022	CM	(England)	Rafferty Pedder	(England) Tottenham Hotspur	Free transfer	
18 March 2022	GK	(Republic of Ireland)	Keiren Westwood	(England) Sheffield Wednesday	Free transfer	

=== Loans in ===
Date from	Position	Nationality	Name	From	Date until	Ref.
12 July 2021	LB	(England)	Sam McCallum	(England) Norwich City	End of season	
31 August 2021	CF	(Jamaica)	Andre Gray	(England) Watford	End of season	
25 January 2022	CB	(England)	Dion Sanderson	(England) Wolverhampton Wanderers	End of season	
31 January 2022	MF	(Republic of Ireland)	Jeff Hendrick	(England) Newcastle United	End of season	

=== Transfers out ===
Date	Position	Nationality	Name	To	Fee	Ref.
30 June 2021	GK	(Poland)	Marcin Brzozowski	(England) Torquay United	Released	
30 June 2021	CB	(United States)	Geoff Cameron	(United States) FC Cincinnati	Free transfer	
30 June 2021	LM	(England)	Deshane Dalling	(England) Hemel Hempstead Town	Released	
30 June 2021	GK	(England)	Tyla Dickinson	(England) Wycombe Wanderers	Released	
30 June 2021	CM	(England)	Dylan Duncan	Unattached	Released	
30 June 2021	FW	(England)	Chimaechi Eze	Unattached	Released	
30 June 2021	MF	(England)	Matthew Gordon	Unattached	Released	
30 June 2021	FW	(England)	Lemar Griffiths	Unattached	Released	
30 June 2021	CM	(England)	Ryan Hayes	Unattached	Released	
30 June 2021	GK	(England)	Joe Lumley	(England) Middlesbrough	Free transfer	
30 June 2021	CF	(England)	Aramide Oteh	(England) Salford City	Released	
30 June 2021	CB	(England)	Junior Paiva	Unattached	Released	
30 June 2021	SS	(Northern Ireland)	Paul Smyth	(England) Leyton Orient	Released	
1 July 2021	CM	(England)	Tom Carroll	(England) Ipswich Town	Released	
5 July 2021	GK	(Scotland)	Liam Kelly	(Scotland) Motherwell	Undisclosed	
20 July 2021	CM	(England)	Reece Cole	(Scotland) Dunfermline Athletic	Free transfer	
23 July 2021	CF	(England)	Manasse Mampala	(England) Carlisle United	Free transfer	
11 August 2021	CF	(England)	Charley Kendall	(England) Eastbourne Borough	Released	
31 August 2021	RB	(England)	Todd Kane	(England) Coventry City	Undisclosed	
14 January 2022	CB	(Greece)	Themis Kefalas	Free agent	Mutual consent	

=== Loans out ===
Date from	Position	Nationality	Name	To	Date until	Ref.
1 July 2021	CF	(Zimbabwe)	Macauley Bonne	(England) Ipswich Town	End of season	
1 July 2021	GK	(England)	Tom Middlehurst	(England) Harlow Town	January 2022	
11 July 2021	LW	(Republic of Ireland)	Olamide Shodipo	(England) Sheffield Wednesday	End of season	
7 August 2021	LB	(Finland)	Niko Hämäläinen	(United States) LA Galaxy	31 December 2021	
18 August 2021	CF	(England)	Hamzad Kargbo	(England) Southend United	October 2021	
21 August 2021	CM	(England)	Faysal Bettache	(England) Oldham Athletic	10 December 2021	
21 August 2021	CB	(Republic of Ireland)	Conor Masterson	(England) Cambridge United	3 January 2022	
31 August 2021	CF	(United States)	Charlie Kelman	(England) Gillingham	1 January 2022	
31 August 2021	CM	(Northern Ireland)	Amrit Bansal-McNulty	(England) Crawley Town	3 January 2022	
25 September 2021	GK	(England)	Murphy Mahoney	(England) Bath City	October 2021	
18 October 2021	CF	(Republic of Ireland)	Sinclair Armstrong	(England) Torquay United	January 2022	
5 November 2021	CB	(England)	Trent Mahorn	(England) Eastbourne Borough	December 2021	
20 November 2021	LB	(Albania)	Franklin Domi	(England) Concord Rangers	December 2021	
26 November 2021	CB	(England)	Joe Gubbins	(England) Aldershot Town	December 2021	
3 December 2021	GK	(England)	Murphy Mahoney	(England) Stratford Town	1 January 2022	
1 January 2022	GK	(Jamaica)	Dillon Barnes	(England) Yeovil Town	End of season	
14 January 2022	CF	(United States)	Charlie Kelman	(England) Gillingham	End of season	
14 January 2022	LB	(England)	Kai Woollard-Innocent	(England) Dartford	28 February 2022	
21 January 2022	RM	(Guyana)	Stephen Duke-McKenna	(England) Torquay United	End of season	
25 January 2022	DF	(England)	Aaron Drewe	(England) Weymouth	End of season	
28 January 2022	CB	(Republic of Ireland)	Conor Masterson	(England) Gillingham	End of season	
29 January 2022	CB	(Netherlands)	Jordy de Wijs	(Germany) Fortuna Düsseldorf	End of season	
31 January 2022	RM	(Northern Ireland)	Amrit Bansal-McNulty	(England) Crawley Town	End of season	
12 February 2022	GK	(Jamaica)	Dillon Barnes	(England) Aldershot Town	End of season	
24 March 2022	LB	(Albania)	Franklin Domi	(England) Ebbsfleet United	End of season	
24 March 2022	CB	(England)	Joe Gubbins	(England) Southend United	End of season	
24 March 2022	CF	(England)	Hamzad Kargbo	(England) Oxford City	End of season	
24 March 2022	LB	(England)	Kai Woollard-Innocent	(England) Eastbourne Borough	End of season	
26 March 2022	CB	(Republic of Ireland)	Nathan Carlyle	(England) Weymouth	End of season	
11 April 2022	CF	(Republic of Ireland)	Sinclair Armstrong	(England) Aldershot Town	End of season	
13 April 2022	LB	(Finland)	Niko Hämäläinen	(Brazil) Botafogo	July 2022	

== Pre-season and friendlies ==
Queens Park Rangers revealed they would play friendly matches against Gillingham, Manchester United, Cambridge United and Leicester City as part of their pre-season preparations. Later it's revealed that Queens Park Rangers played Portsmouth in a behind-closed-doors pre-season on 7 July 2021

However, the friendly against Gillingham planned for 27 July, was later cancelled due to a number of positive COVID-19 test results within the Gills squad.

Win Draw Loss Fixtures

7 July 2021 Friendly	Queens Park Rangers	2–1	Portsmouth	Harlington
14:00 BST	Ramkilde 53'; Shodipo 63' (pen.)	Report	Marquis 22'	Stadium: Imperial College Sports Ground; Attendance: 0 (Behind-closed-doors)

16 July 2021 Friendly	Gillingham	P–P	Queens Park Rangers	Gillingham
19:00 BST		Report		Stadium: Priestfield Stadium
Note: Game postponed following a COVID outbreak in the Gillingham camp.

24 July 2021 Friendly	Queens Park Rangers	4–2	Manchester United	Shepherd's Bush, London
15:00 BST	Austin 7'; Dykes 53', 59'; Odubajo 58'	Report	Lingard 3'; Elanga 73'	Stadium: Kiyan Prince Foundation Stadium; Referee: Gavin Ward

27 July 2021 Friendly	Cambridge United	1–2	Queens Park Rangers	Cambridge
19:00 BST	May 86'	Report	Dykes (penalty missed) 7' 39'; Chair 32'	Stadium: Abbey Stadium; Attendance: 3,158; Referee: Neil Hair

31 July 2021 Friendly	Queens Park Rangers	3–3	Leicester City	Shepherd's Bush, London
15:00 BST	Austin 44'; Barbet 55'; Dickie 83'	Report	Dewsbury-Hall 75'; Daka 77'; Iheanacho 89' (pen.)	Stadium: Kiyan Prince Foundation Stadium; Referee: James Linington

== Competitions ==
=== Sky Bet Championship ===
==== League table ====
Pos	Team	Pld	W	D	L	GF	GA	GD	Pts
8	Blackburn Rovers	46	19	12	15	59	50	+9	69
9	Millwall	46	18	15	13	53	45	+8	69
10	West Bromwich Albion	46	18	13	15	52	45	+7	67
11	Queens Park Rangers	46	19	9	18	60	59	+1	66
12	Coventry City	46	17	13	16	60	59	+1	64
13	Preston North End	46	16	16	14	52	56	−4	64
14	Stoke City	46	17	11	18	57	52	+5	62

Source: EFL Official Website
Rules for classification: 1) Points; 2) Goal difference; 3) Number of goals scored; 4) Head-to-head results; 5) Wins; 6) Away goals; 7) Penalty points (sec 9.5); 8) 12-point sending off offences

==== Results summary ====
Overall								Home						Away					
Pld	W	D	L	GF	GA	GD	Pts	W	D	L	GF	GA	GD	W	D	L	GF	GA	GD
46	19	9	18	60	59	+1	66	10	6	7	30	25	+5	9	3	11	30	34	−4

Last updated: 7 May 2022.

==== Results by matchday ====
Matchday	1	2	3	4	5	6	7	8	9	10	11	12	13	14	15	16	17	18	19	20	21	22	23	24	25	26	27	28	29	30	31	32	33	34	35	36	37	38	39	40	41	42	43	44	45	46
Ground	H	A	A	H	H	A	A	H	A	H	H	A	H	A	H	A	A	H	H	A	H	H	A	A	H	A	H	H	H	A	A	H	H	A	H	A	A	H	H	A	A	A	H	A	H	A
Result	D	W	W	D	W	D	L	L	L	W	W	L	W	L	D	W	D	W	W	W	L	L	W	W	W	W	D	W	D	L	L	D	W	L	L	W	L	L	L	L	L	D	W	L	L	W
Position	18	2	3	5	3	4	7	8	10	8	6	8	5	7	6	5	6	6	4	3	5	7	7	5	4	4	4	4	4	4	4	4	3	5	7	4	6	8	9	9	10	12	10	10	12	11

Updated to match(es) played on 7 May 2022. Source: BBC Sport
A = Away; H = Home; W = Win; D = Draw; L = Loss

==== Matches ====
QPR's fixtures were released on 24 June 2021.

7 August 2021 1	Queens Park Rangers	1–1	Millwall	Shepherd's Bush, London
15:00 BST	Dickie 31'	Report	J. Wallace 11'; Ballard (yellow card) 15'; M. Wallace (yellow card) 43'; Saville (yellow card) 59'	Stadium: Kiyan Prince Foundation Stadium; Attendance: 16,127; Referee: Oliver Langford

14 August 2021 2	Hull City	0–3	Queens Park Rangers	Kingston upon Hull
15:00 BST	Moncur (red card) 71'	Report	Willock 16'; Dykes 68'; Dickie 74'	Stadium: KCOM Stadium; Attendance: 10,728; Referee: Matt Donohue

18 August 2021 3	Middlesbrough	2–3	Queens Park Rangers	Middlesbrough
19:45 BST	Ikpeazu 7' (pen.); Jones (yellow card) 54'; Crooks 72'; Payero (yellow card) 90+8'	Report	Odubajo (yellow card) 38' (yellow-red card) 50'; Howson 48' (o.g.); Dykes 56'; Willock 76'; Johansen (yellow card) 90+3'	Stadium: Riverside Stadium; Attendance: 22,436; Referee: Steve Martin

21 August 2021 4	Queens Park Rangers	2–2	Barnsley	Shepherd's Bush, London
12:30 BST	Barbet (yellow card) 56'; Chair 76' (yellow card) 78'; Austin 90+1'	Report	Frieser 14'; Woodrow 27'; Benson (yellow card) 49'; Styles (yellow card) 56'; Kitching (yellow card) 70'	Stadium: Kiyan Prince Foundation Stadium; Attendance: 11,882; Referee: Gavin Ward
Note: Live on Sky Sports

28 August 2021 5	Queens Park Rangers	2–0	Coventry City	Shepherd's Bush, London
15:00 BST	Johansen (yellow card) 35'; Dykes 68'; Barbet 76'	Report	Clarke-Salter (yellow card) 71'	Stadium: Kiyan Prince Foundation Stadium; Attendance: 14,774; Referee: Dean Whitestone

11 September 2021 6	Reading	3–3	Queens Park Rangers	Reading
15:00 BST	Swift 35' 64' 77'; Cabral (yellow card) 82'; Morrison (yellow card) 87'	Report	Morrison 11' (o.g.); Gray 79'; Dickie (yellow card) 89'; Johansen 90+1'	Stadium: Select Car Leasing Stadium; Attendance: 14,928; Referee: Geoff Eltringham

14 September 2021 7	Bournemouth	2–1	Queens Park Rangers	Kings Park
19:45 BST	Zemura (yellow card) 10'; Anthony 12'; Solanke 37'; Brooks (yellow card) 45'; Kelly (yellow card) 87'; Billing (yellow card) 90+2'; Smith (yellow card) 90+5'	Report	Johansen (yellow card) 45'; McCallum 57'; Willock (yellow card) 72'; Barbet (yellow card) 90+5'	Stadium: Vitality Stadium; Attendance: 10,495; Referee: Keith Stroud

18 September 2021 8	Queens Park Rangers	1–2	Bristol City	Shepherd's Bush, London
15:00 BST	Gray (yellow card) 51'; McCallum 54'; Barbet (yellow card) 79'; Ball (yellow card) 85'; Johansen (yellow card) 89'	Report	Martin 45'; Bakinson (yellow card) 53'; Wells 90+3'	Stadium: Kiyan Prince Foundation Stadium; Attendance: 14,922; Referee: Leigh Doughty

24 September 2021 9	West Bromwich Albion	2–1	Queens Park Rangers	West Bromwich
20:00BST	Grant 75', 88'; Hugill (yellow card) 90+3'	Report	Gray 1'; Kakay (yellow card) 86'	Stadium: The Hawthorns; Attendance: 21,825; Referee: James Linington

28 September 2021 10	Queens Park Rangers	2–0	Birmingham City	Shepherd's Bush, London
19:45 BST	Chair 34', 64'; Dozzell (yellow card) 54'	Report	Šunjić (yellow card) 86'	Stadium: Kiyan Prince Foundation Stadium; Attendance: 12,257; Referee: Michael Salisbury

2 October 2021 11	Queens Park Rangers	3–2	Preston North End	Shepherd's Bush, London
15:00 BST	Dykes 17'; Dunne 71'; Chair 74'; Amos (yellow card) 90+5'	Report	Riis Jakobsen 27'; Earl 46'	Stadium: Kiyan Prince Foundation Stadium; Attendance: 13,624; Referee: Jeremy Simpson

16 October 2021 12	Fulham	4–1	Queens Park Rangers	Fulham
12:30 BST	Mitrović 8', 67'; Decordova-Reid 71'; Robinson 90+1'	Report	Ball (yellow card) 7'; Johansen (yellow card) 45'; Dykes 55'; Odubajo (yellow card) 63'; Dunne (yellow card) 70'	Stadium: Craven Cottage; Attendance: 18,371; Referee: Oliver Langford

19 October 2021 13	Queens Park Rangers	1–0	Blackburn Rovers	Shepherd's Bush, London
19:45 BST	Dickie (yellow card) 28'; Chair 83'; Amos (yellow card) 90+4'	Report	Clarkson (yellow card) 45+1'; Butterworth (yellow card) 50'; Rothwell (yellow card) 55'	Stadium: Kiyan Prince Foundation Stadium; Attendance: 11,771; Referee: David Webb

23 October 2021 14	Peterborough United	2–1	Queens Park Rangers	Peterborough
15:00 BST	Burrows 56'; Dembélé 90+1'	Report	Chair 50'	Stadium: Weston Homes Stadium; Attendance: 12,035; Referee: Jarred Gillett

29 October 2021 15	Queens Park Rangers	1–1	Nottingham Forest	Shepherd's Bush, London
19:45 BST	Dozzell (yellow card) 43'; Dykes 45+5'; Johansen (yellow card) 83'	Report	Colback 90+1'; Worrall (yellow card) 90+2'	Stadium: Kiyan Prince Foundation Stadium; Attendance: 15,089; Referee: Andy Davies

3 November 2021 16	Cardiff City	0–1	Queens Park Rangers	Cardiff
19:45 GMT		Report	Gray 37'; Dickie (yellow card) 47'; Adomah (yellow card) 85'	Stadium: Cardiff City Stadium; Attendance: 16,882; Referee: Andy Woolmer

6 November 2021 17	Blackpool	1–1	Queens Park Rangers	Blackpool
17:30 GMT	Madine (yellow card) 36'; Madine 54' (pen.); Anderson (yellow card) 60'	Report	Willock 26'; Odubajo (yellow card) 33'; Adomah (yellow card) 50'; Dieng (yellow card) 53'; Ball (yellow card) 82'; Dunne (yellow card) 90+5'	Stadium: Bloomfield Road; Attendance: 11,769; Referee: Josh Smith

19 November 2021 18	Queens Park Rangers	2–0	Luton Town	Shepherd's Bush, London
19:45 BST	Willock 10'; Austin 55', (yellow card) 75'; Dozzell (yellow card) 59'; Dickie (yellow card) 90'	Report	Lansbury (yellow card) 13'; Bradley (yellow card) 53'; Adebayo (yellow card) 57'	Stadium: Kiyan Prince Foundation Stadium; Attendance: 15,062; Referee: Matt Donohue

24 November 2021 19	Queens Park Rangers	1–0	Huddersfield Town	Shepherd's Bush, London
19:45 BST	Chair (yellow card) 27'; Dozzell (yellow card) 56'; Amos 81'	Report	Koroma (yellow card) 10'; O'Brien (yellow card) 63'	Stadium: Kiyan Prince Foundation Stadium; Attendance: 11,591; Referee: Graham Scott

29 November 2021 20	Derby County	1–2	Queens Park Rangers	Derby
19:45 GMT	Lawrence 10'	Report	Willock 50'; Gray 90' (yellow card) 90+1'	Stadium: Pride Park Stadium; Attendance: 20,003; Referee: Jeremy Simpson

5 December 2021 21	Queens Park Rangers	0–2	Stoke City	Shepherd's Bush, London
14:30 GMT	Austin (penalty missed) 63'	Report	Campbell 14'; Fox (yellow card) 53'; Vrančić 78'	Stadium: Kiyan Prince Foundation Stadium; Attendance: 13,968; Referee: Tony Harrington

13 December 2021 –	Sheffield United	P–P	Queens Park Rangers	Sheffield
19:45 GMT		Report		Stadium: Bramall Lane
Note: The match was postponed on 12 December 2021 due to positive COVID-19 tests among QPR's players and staff.

18 December 2021 –	Queens Park Rangers	P–P	Swansea City	Shepherd's Bush, London
15:00 GMT		Report		Stadium: Kiyan Prince Foundation Stadium
Note: The match was postponed on 14 December 2021 due to positive COVID-19 tests among QPR's players and staff.

27 December 2021 22	Queens Park Rangers	0–1	Bournemouth	Shepherd's Bush, London
17:30 GMT	Field (yellow card) 40'; Dozzell (yellow card) 58' (yellow-red card) 90+8'; Barbet (yellow card) 90+7'	Report	Solanke 41'; Christie (yellow card) 56'; Billing (yellow card) 76'; Mepham (yellow card) 90+7'; Pearson (yellow card) 90+7'	Stadium: Kiyan Prince Foundation Stadium; Attendance: 16,308; Referee: Keith Stroud

30 December 2021 23	Bristol City	1–2	Queens Park Rangers	Bristol
19:45 GMT	Scott 3'; King (yellow card) 45+3' (yellow-red card) 56'; Weimann (yellow card) 67'	Report	Dunne (yellow card) 22'; Austin 45+3' (pen.); Dykes (yellow card) 65'; Field (yellow card) 74'; Barbet 90+3'	Stadium: Ashton Gate; Referee: Andy Woolmer

2 January 2022 24	Birmingham City	1–2	Queens Park Rangers	Bordesley
14:00 GMT	Aneke 75'; Šunjić (yellow card) 88'	Report	Adomah 14'; Dickie (yellow card) 59'; Willock 71'; Amos (yellow card) 73'; Field (yellow card) 88'	Stadium: St Andrew's Stadium; Referee: David Webb

15 January 2022 25	Queens Park Rangers	1–0	West Bromwich Albion	Shepherd's Bush, London
15:00 GMT	Dickie (yellow card) 9'; Field (yellow card) 70'; Austin 89'	Report	Molumby (yellow card) 90+7'	Stadium: Kiyan Prince Foundation Stadium; Attendance: 16,018; Referee: Simon Hooper

22 January 2022 26	Coventry City	1–2	Queens Park Rangers	Coventry
15:00 GMT	Shipley 50'; O'Hare (yellow card) 79'; McFadzean (yellow card) 90+15'	Report	Gray 6'; Dickie (yellow card) 66'; Adomah 88'	Stadium: Coventry Building Society Arena; Attendance: 20,942; Referee: Andy Woolmer

25 January 2022 27	Queens Park Rangers	0–0	Swansea City	Shepherd's Bush, London
19:45 GMT	Odubajo (yellow card) 69'; Johansen (yellow card) 76'; Austin (yellow card) 90+2'	Report	Smith (yellow card) 29'; Cabango (yellow card) 47'; Downes (yellow card) 72' (yellow-red card) 90+2'; Obafemi (yellow card) 90+5'	Stadium: Kiyan Prince Foundation Stadium; Attendance: 12,770; Referee: Andy Davies

29 January 2022 28	Queens Park Rangers	4–0	Reading	Shepherd's Bush, London
15:00 GMT	Dykes 13', 35'; Amos 37'; Dickie (yellow card) 44'; Wallace (yellow card) 45+2'; Adomah (yellow card) 49'; Dunne 51'; Field (yellow card) 90+1'	Report	Rinomhota (yellow card) 48'; Swift (yellow card) 72'	Stadium: Kiyan Prince Foundation Stadium; Attendance: 16,057; Referee: Jeremy Simpson

9 February 2022 29	Queens Park Rangers	2–2	Middlesbrough	Shepherd's Bush, London
19:45 GMT	Chair 29'; Willock 46'	Report	Fry 45+2'; Adomah 60' (o.g.); Howson (yellow card) 84'	Stadium: Kiyan Prince Foundation Stadium; Attendance: 14,140; Referee: Dean Whitestone

12 February 2022 30	Barnsley	1–0	Queens Park Rangers	Barnsley
15:00 GMT	Quina (yellow card) 59', (goal) 74'	Report	Dickie (yellow card) 75'	Stadium: Oakwell; Attendance: 12,476; Referee: Michael Salisbury

15 February 2022 31	Millwall	2–0	Queens Park Rangers	Bermondsey
19:45 GMT	Bennett 48'; Wallace (yellow card) 59'; Burey 64', (yellow card) 65'	Report	Dickie (yellow card) 45+3'	Stadium: The Den; Attendance: 13,063; Referee: James Linington

19 February 2022 32	Queens Park Rangers	1–1	Hull City	Shepherd's Bush
15:00 GMT	Chair (yellow card) 34', (goal) 75'; Austin (yellow card) 90'	Report	Forss 26', (yellow card) 45+3'	Stadium: Kiyan Prince Foundation Stadium; Attendance: 14,945; Referee: Tim Robinson

23 February 2022 33	Queens Park Rangers	2–1	Blackpool	Shepherd's Bush
19:45 GMT	Dunne 31'; Sanderson (red card) 40'; Dieng (yellow card) 58'; Ball (yellow card) 70'; Amos 89' (o.g.); Field (yellow card) 90+3'	Report	James (yellow card) 40'; Bowler 82', (yellow card) 90+2'	Stadium: Kiyan Prince Foundation Stadium; Attendance: 12,042; Referee: Gavin Ward

26 February 2022 34	Blackburn Rovers	1–0	Queens Park Rangers	Blackburn
12:30 GMT	Khadra 77'; Travis (yellow card) 84'; Kaminski (yellow card) 89'; Wharton (yellow card) 90+1'	Report	Field (yellow card) 6'; Chair (yellow card) 90+2'	Stadium: Ewood Park; Attendance: 14,293; Referee: Jeremy Simpson

5 March 2022 35	Queens Park Rangers	1–2	Cardiff City	Shepherd's Bush
15:00 GMT	Gray 38'; Dickie (yellow card) 73'		Davies 70'; Colwill 74'	Stadium: Kiyan Prince Foundation Stadium; Attendance: 16,170

12 March 2022 36	Luton Town	1–2	Queens Park Rangers	Luton
15:00 GMT	Jerome 37'	Report	Chair (yellow card) 45+6'; Gray 55' (pen.); Dickie 83'; Amos (yellow card) 87'; Wallace (yellow card) 90+5'	Stadium: Kenilworth Road; Attendance: 10,073; Referee: Josh Smith

16 March 2022 37	Nottingham Forest	3–1	Queens Park Rangers	West Bridgford
19:45 GMT	Spence 55'; Yates (yellow card) 62', (goal) 83'; Davis (yellow card) 77'; Johnson 87'	Report	Dozzell (yellow card) 36'; Gray 40'; Dunne (yellow card) 43'; Field (yellow card) 54'; Wallace (yellow card) 60'; Odubajo (yellow card) 80'	Stadium: The City Ground; Attendance: 27,872; Referee: Peter Bankes

20 March 2022 38	Queens Park Rangers	1–3	Peterborough United	Shepherd's Bush
12:30 GMT	Amos 9'; Field (yellow card) 66'	Report	Clarke-Harris 39', 53' (pen.); Mumba (yellow card) 45'; Marriott 54', (yellow card) 56'; Norburn (yellow card) 67'	Stadium: Kiyan Prince Foundation Stadium; Attendance: 13,753; Referee: David Webb

2 April 2022 39	Queens Park Rangers	0–2	Fulham	Shepherd's Bush
15:00 BST	Wallace (yellow card) 51'; Barbet (yellow card) 76'; Field (yellow card) 90+1'	Report	Mitrović 14', 78' (pen.)	Stadium: Kiyan Prince Foundation Stadium; Attendance: 17,648; Referee: Gavin Ward

5 April 2022 40	Sheffield United	1–0	Queens Park Rangers	Sheffield
19:45 BST	Norwood 9'; Uremović (yellow card) 51'; Fleck (yellow card) 87'	Report	Dickie (yellow card) 12'; Hendrick (yellow card) 58'; Field (yellow card) 80'	Stadium: Bramall Lane; Attendance: 26,488; Referee: Darren Bond

9 April 2022 41	Preston North End	2–1	Queens Park Rangers	Preston
15:00 BST	Dunne 42' (o.g.); Archer 50'	Report	Field (yellow card) 85'; Gray 90+3' (pen.)	Stadium: Deepdale; Attendance: 10,873; Referee: Tony Harrington

15 April 2022 42	Huddersfield Town	2–2	Queens Park Rangers	Huddersfield
17:30 BST	Barbet 6' (o.g.); Toffolo 53'; O'Brien (yellow card) 64'; Holmes (yellow card) 66'; Thomas (yellow card) 90+1'	Report	Amos 43'; Chair 58'; Austin (yellow card) 90+2'; Field (yellow card) 90+5'	Stadium: John Smith's Stadium; Referee: Leigh Doughty

18 April 2022 43	Queens Park Rangers	1–0	Derby County	Shepherd's Bush
15:00 BST	Dozzell (yellow card) 59'; Field (yellow card) 72'; Amos 88'	Report	Lawrence (yellow card) 56' (yellow-red card) 90+8'	Stadium: Kiyan Prince Foundation Stadium; Attendance: 15,298; Referee: Josh Smith

23 April 2022 44	Stoke City	1–0	Queens Park Rangers	Stoke-on-Trent
15:00 BST	Brown 45+1'	Report	Dunne (yellow card) 13'	Stadium: Bet365 Stadium; Attendance: 19,251; Referee: Andy Woolmer

29 April 2022 45	Queens Park Rangers	1–3	Sheffield United	Shepherd's Bush
19:45 BST	Austin 31'; McCallum (yellow card) 88'; Johansen (yellow card) 90+6'	Report	Ndiaye 54'; Robinson 73', (yellow card) 90'; Fleck (yellow card) 87'; Hourihane 90+4'	Stadium: Kiyan Prince Foundation Stadium; Attendance: 15,824; Referee: Peter Bankes

7 May 2022 46	Swansea City	0–1	Queens Park Rangers	Landore
12:30 BST		Report	Gray 80'	Stadium: Swansea.com Stadium; Attendance: 18,608; Referee: Steve Martin

=== Emirates FA Cup ===
QPR were drawn at home to Rotherham United in the third round.

8 January 2022 Third round	Queens Park Rangers	1–1 (a.e.t.) (8–7 p)	Rotherham United (League One)	Shepherd's Bush
15:00 GMT	Johansen (yellow card) 16'; Dykes 115'	Report	Ihiekwe 98'; Lindsay (yellow card) 99'; Harding (yellow card) 110'	Stadium: Kiyan Prince Foundation Stadium; Referee: Michael Salisbury
	Penalties
	Dykes (penalty scored); Johansen (penalty scored); Gray (penalty scored); Dozzell (penalty missed); Adomah (penalty scored); Amos (penalty scored); Barbet (penalty scored); Dunne (penalty scored); Dickie (penalty scored)		Smith (penalty scored); Rathbone (penalty scored); Harding (penalty missed); Kayode (penalty scored); Odoffin (penalty scored); Lindsay (penalty scored); Bola (penalty scored); Ihiekwe (penalty scored); Ogbene (penalty missed)

5 February 2022 Fourth round	Peterborough United (Championship)	2–0	Queens Park Rangers	Peterborough
15:00 GMT	Ward 25'; Clarke-Harris (yellow card) 29'; Edwards (yellow card) 45'; Fuchs (yellow card) 63'; Jones 71', (yellow card) 83'; Norburn (yellow card) 87'; Thompson (yellow card) 90+6'	Report	Dunne (yellow card) 43'; Dozzell (yellow card) 90+2'	Stadium: Weston Homes Stadium; Attendance: 10,119; Referee: David Webb

=== Carabao Cup ===
QPR were drawn away to Leyton Orient in the first round. Then at home to Oxford United, Everton and Sunderland in the second, third and fourth round respectively.

11 August 2021 First round	Leyton Orient (League Two)	1–1 (3–5 p)	Queens Park Rangers	Leyton
19:45 BST	Wood (yellow card) 64'; Drinan 74'	Report	Dickie 16'; Odubajo (yellow card) 49'	Stadium: Breyer Group Stadium; Referee: Craig Hicks
	Penalties
	Drinan (penalty scored); Sotiriou (penalty missed); James (penalty scored); Kemp (penalty scored)		Dykes (penalty scored); Ball (penalty scored); Dozzell (penalty scored); Kelman (penalty scored); Adomah (penalty scored)
Note: Live on Sky Sports

24 August 2021 Second round	Queens Park Rangers	2–0	Oxford United (League One)	Shepherd's Bush
19:45 BST	Dickie 26'; Chambers-Parillon 40' (o.g.); Chair (yellow card) 66'	Report	Johnson (yellow card) 76'	Stadium: Kiyan Prince Foundation Stadium; Attendance: 8,154; Referee: Tom Nield

21 September 2021 Third round	Queens Park Rangers	2–2 (8–7 p)	Everton (Premier League)	Shepherd's Bush
19:45 BST	Austin 18', 34'; McCallum (yellow card) 49'; Dickie (yellow card) 88'	Report	Digne 30'; Townsend 47'	Stadium: Kiyan Prince Foundation Stadium; Attendance: 12,888; Referee: Kevin Friend
	Penalties
	Austin (penalty scored); Ball (penalty scored); Barbet (penalty scored); Willock (penalty scored); Adomah (penalty scored); Duke-McKenna (penalty scored); Amos (penalty scored); Dunne (penalty scored)		Holgate (penalty scored); Keane (penalty scored); Townsend (penalty scored); Gray (penalty scored); Gordon (penalty scored); Doucouré (penalty scored); Godfrey (penalty scored); Davies (penalty missed)

26 October 2021 Fourth round	Queens Park Rangers	0–0 (1–3 p)	Sunderland (League One)	Shepherd's Bush
19:45 BST		Report		Stadium: Kiyan Prince Foundation Stadium; Attendance: 15,372; Referee: Keith Stroud
	Penalties
	Austin (penalty missed); Chair (penalty missed); Dykes (penalty scored); Barbet (penalty missed)		(penalty scored) McGeady; (penalty scored) Stewart; (penalty scored) Pritchard

== Squad statistics ==
=== Statistics ===
As of 10 May 2022

No.	Pos	Nat	Player	Total		Sky Bet Championship		Carabao Cup		Emirates FA Cup	
No.	Pos	Nat	Player	Apps	Goals	Apps	Goals	Apps	Goals	Apps	Goals
1	GK	(Senegal) SEN	Seny Dieng	30	0	28	0	2	0	0	0
2	DF	(Sierra Leone) SLE	Osman Kakay	15	0	4+8	0	2+1	0	0	0
3	DF	(Scotland) SCO	Lee Wallace	24	0	21	0	1	0	2	0
4	DF	(England) ENG	Rob Dickie	44	5	38	3	4	2	2	0
5	DF	(Netherlands) NED	Jordy de Wijs	13	0	11+1	0	1	0	0	0
6	DF	(France) FRA	Yoann Barbet	45	2	41	2	3	0	1	0
7	MF	(Norway) NOR	Stefan Johansen	37	1	31+4	1	0	0	2	0
8	MF	(England) ENG	Luke Amos	34	6	16+14	6	1+1	0	1+1	0
9	FW	(Scotland) SCO	Lyndon Dykes	35	9	27+4	8	2	0	1+1	1
10	MF	(Morocco) MAR	Ilias Chair	43	9	37+2	9	3	0	1	0
11	FW	(England) ENG	Charlie Austin	38	7	15+19	5	1+1	2	2	0
12	MF	(England) ENG	Dominic Ball	22	0	13+6	0	1+1	0	1	0
13	GK	(Scotland) SCO	Jordan Archer	3	0	0	0	2	0	1	0
14	MF	(Wales) WAL	George Thomas	23	0	6+13	0	2	0	1+1	0
15	MF	(England) ENG	Sam Field	28	0	25+3	0	0	0	0	0
16	DF	(England) ENG	Sam McCallum	19	2	15+2	2	2	0	0	0
17	MF	(England) ENG	Andre Dozzell	33	0	18+9	0	3+1	0	0+2	0
19	FW	(Jamaica) JAM	Andre Gray	30	10	13+15	10	1	0	1	0
20	DF	(Republic of Ireland) IRL	Jimmy Dunne	43	3	34+4	3	3	0	2	0
21	FW	(England) ENG	Chris Willock	38	7	34+1	7	3	0	0	0
22	DF	(England) ENG	Moses Odubajo	32	0	23+4	0	2+1	0	1+1	0
24	MF	(Northern Ireland) NIR	Charlie Owens	0	0	0	0	0	0	0	0
25	GK	(Scotland) SCO	David Marshall	12	0	10+1	0	0	0	1	0
27	MF	(Republic of Ireland) IRL	Jeff Hendrick	10	0	6+3	0	0	0	0+1	0
28	DF	(England) ENG	Dion Sanderson	12	0	10+1	0	0	0	1	0
29	GK	(Republic of Ireland) IRL	Kieran Westwood	6	0	6	0	0	0	0	0
32	GK	(England) ENG	Joe Walsh	0	0	0	0	0	0	0	0
33	GK	(Jamaica) JAM	Dillon Barnes	0	0	0	0	0	0	0	0
34	MF	(Guyana) GUY	Stephen Duke-McKenna	3	0	0	0	0+3	0	0	0
37	MF	(Ghana) GHA	Albert Adomah	38	2	22+11	2	2+1	0	1+1	0
38	GK	(England) ENG	Murphy Mahoney	2	0	2	0	0	0	0	0
39	DF	(England) ENG	Joe Gubbins	1	0	0	0	0+1	0	0	0
40	FW	(Nigeria) NGR	Ody Alfa	1	0	0	0	0+1	0	0	0
41	DF	(England) ENG	Aaron Drewe	1	0	0	0	0	0	0+1	0
Out on Loan
18	FW	(United States) USA	Charlie Kelman	3	0	0+1	0	1+1	0	0	0
23	DF	(Republic of Ireland) IRL	Conor Masterson	0	0	0	0	0	0	0	0
26	MF	(England) ENG	Faysal Bettache	1	0	0	0	1	0	0	0

=== Goals ===
As of 12 May 2022

Rank	Player	Position	Championship	FA Cup	EFL Cup	Total
1	(Jamaica) Andre Gray	FW	10	0	0	10
2	(Morocco) Ilias Chair	MF	9	0	0	9
2	(Scotland) Lyndon Dykes	FW	8	1	0	9
4	(England) Chris Willock	MF	7	0	0	7
4	(England) Charlie Austin	FW	5	0	2	7
6	(England) Luke Amos	MF	6	0	0	6
7	(England) Rob Dickie	DF	3	0	2	5
8	(Republic of Ireland) Jimmy Dunne	DF	3	0	0	3
9	(Ghana) Albert Adomah	MF	2	0	0	2
9	(England) Sam McCallum	DF	2	0	0	2
9	(France) Yoann Barbet	DF	2	0	0	2
12	(Norway) Stefan Johansen	MF	1	0	0	1
Own goal			2	0	1	3
Total			60	1	5	66

=== Clean sheets ===
As of 29 April 2022

Rank	Player	Position	Championship	FA Cup	EFL Cup	Total
1	(Senegal) Seny Dieng	GK	7	0	1	8
2	(Scotland) David Marshall	GK	3	0	0	3
3	(Scotland) Jordan Archer	GK	0	0	1	1
3	(Republic of Ireland) Keiren Westwood	GK	1	0	0	1
Total			11	0	2	13

=== Disciplinary record ===
As of 8 January 2022

No.	Pos.	Name	Championship			FA Cup			League Cup			Total		
No.	Pos.	Name	Booked	(yellow card) (yellow-red card)	Sent off (straight red)	Booked	(yellow card) (yellow-red card)	Sent off (straight red)	Booked	(yellow card) (yellow-red card)	Sent off (straight red)	Booked	(yellow card) (yellow-red card)	Sent off (straight red)
1	GK	Seny Dieng	1	0	0	0	0	0	0	0	0	1	0	0
2	DF	Osman Kakay	1	0	0	0	0	0	0	0	0	1	0	0
4	DF	Rob Dickie	5	0	0	0	0	0	1	0	0	6	0	0
5	DF	Jordy de Wijs	0	0	0	0	0	0	1	0	0	1	0	0
6	DF	Yoann Barbet	4	0	0	0	0	0	0	0	0	3	0	0
7	MF	Stefan Johansen	6	0	0	1	0	0	0	0	0	7	0	0
8	MF	Luke Amos	3	0	0	0	0	0	0	0	0	3	0	0
9	FW	Lyndon Dykes	1	0	0	0	0	0	0	0	0	1	0	0
10	MF	Ilias Chair	2	0	0	0	0	0	1	0	0	3	0	0
11	FW	Charlie Austin	1	0	0	0	0	0	0	0	0	1	0	0
12	MF	Dominic Ball	3	0	0	0	0	0	1	0	0	4	0	0
15	MF	Sam Field	3	0	0	0	0	0	0	0	0	3	0	0
17	MF	Andre Dozzell	1	1	0	0	0	0	0	0	0	1	1	0
16	DF	Sam McCallum	0	0	0	0	0	0	1	0	0	1	0	0
19	FW	Andre Gray	2	0	0	0	0	0	0	0	0	2	0	0
20	DF	Jimmy Dunne	3	0	0	0	0	0	0	0	0	3	0	0
21	FW	Chris Willock	1	0	0	0	0	0	0	0	0	1	0	0
22	DF	Moses Odubajo	2	1	0	0	0	0	1	0	0	3	1	0
37	MF	Albert Adomah	2	0	0	0	0	0	0	0	0	2	0	0
Total			44	2	0	1	0	0	6	0	0	51	2	0
