= Seny Dieng =

Footballer (born 1994)

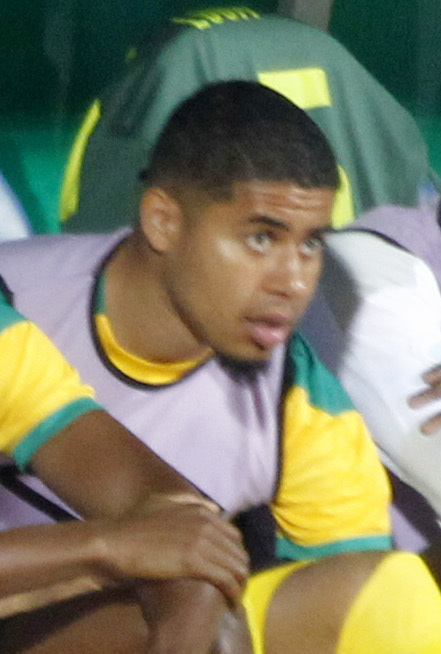
- Dieng with Senegal in 2022

Personal information
- Full name: Seny Timothy Dieng
- Date of birth: 23 November 1994 (age 31)
- Place of birth: Zürich, Switzerland
- Height: 1.93 m (6 ft 4 in)
- Position: Goalkeeper

Team information
- Current team: Atromitos
- Number: 88

Youth career
- –2010: Red Star Zürich

Senior career*
Years	Team	Apps	(Gls)
2010–2011	Red Star Zürich	1	(0)
2011–2016	Grasshoppers II	42	(0)
2012–2013	→ FC Grenchen (loan)	3	(0)
2013–2016	Grasshoppers	0	(0)
2016	MSV Duisburg	0	(0)
2016	MSV Duisburg II	2	(0)
2016	AFC Fylde	2	(0)
2016–2023	Queens Park Rangers	116	(1)
2017–2018	→ Whitehawk (loan)	8	(1)
2018	→ Hampton & Richmond Borough (loan)	13	(0)
2018–2019	→ Stevenage (loan)	13	(0)
2019	→ Dundee (loan)	16	(0)
2019–2020	→ Doncaster Rovers (loan)	27	(0)
2023–2026	Middlesbrough	52	(0)
2026	→ Sheffield Wednesday (loan)	3	(0)
2026–	Atromitos	0	(0)

International career^{‡}
2021–2024	Senegal	9	(0)
Medal record
Men's football
Representing Senegal
Africa Cup of Nations
Winner	2021 Cameroon
- * Club domestic league appearances and goals as of 17:05, 28 February 2026 (UTC) ‡ National team caps and goals as of 16 November 2024 (UTC)

Seny Timothy Dieng (born 23 November 1994) is a professional footballer who plays as a goalkeeper for Super League Greece club Atromitos. Born in Switzerland, Dieng represents Senegal at international level.

== Club career ==
=== Early career ===
In July 2011, Dieng signed for Grasshoppers from Red Star Zurich.

In November 2012, Dieng made his debut in adult football at the age of 17, for FC Grenchen whilst on loan from Grasshoppers. He signed his first professional contract with Grasshoppers on 1 August 2014.

On 5 August 2014, Dieng was named on the bench in a 3rd qualifying round Champions League match against Lille.

On 2 February 2016, aged 21, Dieng signed for MSV Duisburg on a free transfer but relegation to 3. Liga meant he was released months later without having made any appearances.

Dieng left for a career in England where he went on trial with AFC Fylde, Rochdale and Barnsley.

=== Queens Park Rangers ===
On 26 August 2016, Dieng signed for Queens Park Rangers on a free transfer until 2018.

On 3 July 2019, Dieng signed a new two-year deal with QPR, keeping him at the club until 2021.

==== Loan spells ====
On 2 December 2017, while playing for Whitehawk (in National League South) on loan, Dieng scored a goal in the 91st minute of a game against Chippenham Town. Going up into the Chippenham box for a late corner, he headed in from 8 yards.

Dieng spent the first half of the 2018–19 season, on loan at Stevenage, making his debut on 14 August 2018 in an EFL Cup match against Norwich City.

On 10 January 2019, Dieng joined Dundee on a loan deal for the remainder of the 2018–19 season.

On 26 July 2019, having still not made a senior appearance for QPR, Dieng went out on loan again, this time joining League One side Doncaster Rovers until 4 January 2020. Dieng made his Rovers debut in an EFL Cup match against Grimsby Town on 13 August 2019. This loan was extended to the end of the season on 3 January 2020, with, at the time, only 3 sides having conceded fewer in the division.

==== Return to QPR ====
On 20 September 2020, Dieng signed a new four-year deal with QPR, keeping him at the club until 2024.

Dieng made his first league start for Queens Park Rangers on 26 September 2020, in a 1–1 draw at home to Middlesbrough. Dieng was named QPR's Player of the Month on two occasions during the season, in November and January. On 17 April 2021, Dieng received a red card on the 58th minute after a late challenge on Duncan Watmore in a 2–1 away win at Middlesbrough. Throughout the 2020–21 season, Dieng made 42 appearances and kept 11 clean sheets in his first full season for QPR. At the end of the season, Dieng was named Players' Player of the Year alongside Rob Dickie. He also finished the season having made the most saves of any goalkeeper in the Championship.

Dieng was handed the No.1 jersey for the 2021–22 campaign.

On 13 August 2022 he scored his first goal for the club with a last minute header to equalise away to Sunderland.

=== Middlesbrough ===
On 8 July 2023, Dieng completed a transfer for Middlesbrough for a reported transfer fee of £2 million, signing a four-year contract.

During October 2023 he conceded just one goal, and was praised by manager, Michael Carrick, for how well he had settled into his new side.

On 20 February 2026, Dieng joined Sheffield Wednesday on an emergency seven-day loan, following an injury to Murphy Cooper. He made his debut in the 1–2 defeat in the Steel City derby against Sheffield United, which saw Wednesday relegated to League One. His loan was extended by a further seven-days so he could play against Southampton. He returned to Middlesbrough having played three times.

On 17 August 2026, it was announced that Dieng had joined Greek side Atromitos, after his contract with Middlesbrough had been cancelled by mutual consent.

== International career ==
In May 2014, Dieng received his first call-up for Senegal for their friendly against Colombia, remaining on the bench for the 2–2 draw.

Dieng was again called up to the Senegal team in March 2021 and made his debut on 30 March in a 1–1 draw with Eswatini as Senegal qualified top of 2021 Africa Cup of Nations qualification Group I . Dieng was subsequently named in the Senegal squad for the 2021 Africa Cup of Nations and following a positive test for COVID-19 from first-choice goalkeeper Edouard Mendy, Dieng started in Senegal's two opening matches. He kept a clean sheet in each of those appearances, actions proving to be vital given Senegal only managed 1 goal throughout the entirety of the group stages before going on to win the tournament, beating Egypt on penalties.

Dieng was non-playing member of Senegal's squad for the 2022 FIFA World Cup in Qatar.

In December 2023, he was named in Senegal's squad for the postponed 2023 Africa Cup of Nations held in the Ivory Coast.

== Personal life ==
Dieng was born and raised in Zürich to a Senegalese father and a Swiss mother. Parallel to his football education at Red Star and Grasshopper Club, he completed his school education at the Sport Academy Zurich.

He was appointed a Grand Officer of the National Order of the Lion by President of Senegal Macky Sall following the nation's victory at the 2021 Africa Cup of Nations.

== Career statistics ==
=== Club ===
As of 28 February 2026

Appearances and goals by club, season and competition
Club	Season	League			National cup (Note: Includes FA Cup, Scottish Cup)		League cup (Note: Includes EFL Cup)		Other		Total	
Club	Season	Division	Apps	Goals	Apps	Goals	Apps	Goals	Apps	Goals	Apps	Goals
Queens Park Rangers	2016–17	Championship	0	0	0	0	0	0	0	0	0	0
Queens Park Rangers	2017–18	Championship	0	0	0	0	0	0	0	0	0	0
Queens Park Rangers	2018–19	Championship	0	0	0	0	0	0	0	0	0	0
Queens Park Rangers	2019–20	Championship	0	0	0	0	0	0	0	0	0	0
Queens Park Rangers	2020–21	Championship	42	0	1	0	0	0	0	0	43	0
Queens Park Rangers	2021–22	Championship	28	0	0	0	2	0	0	0	30	0
Queens Park Rangers	2022–23	Championship	46	1	0	0	1	0	0	0	47	1
Queens Park Rangers	Total		116	1	1	0	3	0	0	0	120	1
Whitehawk (loan)	2017–18	National League South	8	1	0	0	0	0	3	0	11	1
Hampton & Richmond Borough (loan)	2017–18	National League South	13	0	0	0	0	0	0	0	13	0
Stevenage (loan)	2018–19	League Two	13	0	1	0	1	0	1	0	16	0
Dundee (loan)	2018–19	Scottish Premiership	16	0	2	0	0	0	0	0	18	0
Doncaster Rovers (loan)	2019–20	League One	27	0	3	0	1	0	1	0	32	0
Middlesbrough	2023–24	Championship	35	0	0	0	0	0	0	0	35	0
Middlesbrough	2024–25	Championship	17	0	0	0	0	0	0	0	17	0
Middlesbrough	2025–26	Championship	0	0	0	0	0	0	0	0	0	0
Middlesbrough	Total		52	0	0	0	0	0	0	0	52	0
Sheffield Wednesday (loan)	2025–26	Championship	3	0	0	0	0	0	0	0	3	0
Career total			172	2	7	0	5	0	5	0	189	2

=== International ===
As of match played 14 January 2022

Appearances and goals by national team and year
National team	Year	Apps	Goals
Senegal	2021	1	0
Senegal	2022	2	0
Senegal	2023	1	0
Senegal	2024	4	0
Total		9	0

== Honours ==
Senegal

- Africa Cup of Nations: 2021

Individual

- Queens Park Rangers Goal of the Season: 2022–23 (vs. Sunderland, 13 August 2022)
- Grand Officer of the National Order of the Lion: 2022
