= 2025–26 Al-Zawraa SC season =

Al-Zawraa
2025–26 season
- President: Haidar Shanshool
- Head coach: Emad El Nahhas
- Ground: Al-Zawraa Stadium
- Iraq Stars League: TBD
- Iraq FA Cup: TBD
- AFC Champions League Two: TBD
- Top goalscorer: League: N/A; All: TBD

The 2025–26 season is Al-Zawraa's 51st season in the Iraq Stars League. Al-Zawraa are participating in the Iraq Stars League and the Iraq FA Cup. Al-Zawraa are also competing in the AFC Champions League Two.

Al-Zawraa were initially scheduled to begin their season with the Iraqi Super Cup, but the competition was cancelled.

== Competitions ==
=== League table ===
Pos	Team	Pld	W	D	L	GF	GA	GD	Pts	Qualification or relegation
2	Al-Shorta	38	25	7	6	71	29	+42	82	Qualification for the AFC Champions League Two group stage
3	Erbil	38	23	10	5	59	32	+27	79	Qualification for the GFF Gulf Club Champions League group stage
4	Al-Zawraa	38	17	15	6	50	32	+18	66	Qualification for the GFF Gulf Club Champions League group stage
5	Al-Karma	38	17	14	7	53	26	+27	65 (Note: Al-Karma finished ahead of Al-Talaba on overall goal difference: Al-Karma +27, Al-Talaba +15. The two teams were tied on head-to-head points and goal difference: Al-Karma 1–1 Al-Talaba, Al-Talaba 1–1 Al-Karma.)	
6	Al-Talaba	38	18	11	9	53	38	+15	65	

Source: SofaScore
Rules for classification: 1) Points; 2) Head-to-head points; 3) Head-to-head goal difference; 4) Goal difference; 5) Number of goals scored; 6) Number of wins.
Notes:

21 September 2025 1	Al-Zawraa	1–1	Al-Talaba	Baghdad
19:30 GMT	Raad 28'		Aribi 65'	Stadium: Al-Zawraa Stadium

27 September 2025 2	Al-Karma	0–0	Al-Zawraa	Karma
19:30 GMT				Stadium: Al-Karma Stadium

5 October 2025 3	Al-Zawraa	0–2	Al-Quwa Al-Jawiya	Baghdad
19:30 GMT			Jawad 6'; Jouini 60'	Stadium: Al-Zawraa Stadium

27 October 2025 4	Al-Qasim	0–2	Al-Zawraa	Babil
18:30 GMT			Al-Rashdan 4'; Tomiwa 30'	Stadium: Al Kifl Stadium

31 October 2025 5	Al-Mosul	1–3	Al-Zawraa	Mosul
18:30 GMT	Foning 60'		Al-Humaidan 22', 35'; Abdulkareem 58'	Stadium: University of Mosul Stadium

21 November 2025 6	Al-Zawraa	2–1	Newroz	Baghdad
15:00 GMT	Abdulkareem 63', 75'		Rwa 66'	Stadium: Al-Zawraa Stadium

28 December 2025 7	Al-Zawraa	2–0	Al-Minaa	Baghdad
	Hayder Abdulkareem 38', 79'			Stadium: Al-Zawraa Stadium

1 January 2026 8	Al-Kahraba	0–1	Al-Zawraa	Baghdad
			Abdulkareem 41'

5 January 2026 9	Al-Zawraa	0–0	Al-Gharraf	Baghdad
				Stadium: Al-Zawraa Stadium

9 January 2026 10	Naft Maysan	2–2	Al-Zawraa	Maysan
	Saad 40'; Faqar 69'		Raad 6'; Tomiwa 52'	Stadium: Maysan Olympic Stadium

13 January 2026 11	Diyala	1–1	Al-Zawraa	Diyala
	Thameur 81'		Abdulkareem 80' (pen.)	Stadium: Diyala Stadium

17 January 2026 12	Al-Zawraa	1–0	Erbil	Baghdad
	Mohammed 69'			Stadium: Al-Zawraa Stadium

22 January 2026 13	Al-Zawraa	2–0	Al-Najaf	Baghdad
	Abdulkareem 74'; Aziz 84'			Stadium: Al-Zawraa Stadium

28 January 2026 14	Duhok	0–0	Al-Zawraa	Duhok
				Stadium: Duhok Stadium

1 February 2026 15	Al-Naft	0–0	Al-Zawraa	Baghdad
				Stadium: Sharar Haidar Stadium

5 February 2026 16	Al-Zawraa	4–2	Zakho	Baghdad
	Tomiwa 47'; Riascos 49'; Abdulkareem 58'; Tomiwa 63'		Aliyu 80'; Jameel 89'	Stadium: Al-Zawraa Stadium

21 February 2026 17	Al-Karkh	3–1	Al-Zawraa	Baghdad
19:15	Hamoud 12'; Kofi 62'; Jamal 76'		Abdulkareem 87'	Stadium: Sharar Haidar Stadium

26 February 2026 18	Al-Zawraa	1–2	Al-Shorta	Baghdad
17:30	Qasim 21'		Ateba 11', 68'	Stadium: Al-Zawraa Stadium

2 March 2026 19	Al-Zawraa	1–1	Al-Mosul	Baghdad
19:15	Riascos 21'		Al-Dali 90+1' (pen.)	Stadium: Al-Zawraa Stadium

7 March 2026 20	Newroz	1–2	Al-Zawraa	Sulaymaniyah
17:00	Neto 30'		Hashim 13'; Riascos 88'	Stadium: Newroz Stadium

13 March 2026 21	Al-Zawraa	1–1	Naft Maysan	Baghdad
19:15	Riascos 37'		Saad 44'	Stadium: Al-Zawraa Stadium

17 March 2026 22	Al-Gharraf	0–1	Al-Zawraa	Dhi Qar
			Ahmed 29'	Stadium: Al-Nasiriya International Stadium

21 March 2026 23	Al-Zawraa	3–2	Amanat Baghdad	Baghdad
	Riascos 9'; Qasim 45'; Nasib 45+6'		Kosimov 31'; Kareem 62'	Stadium: Al-Zawraa Stadium

25 March 2026 24	Al-Zawraa	1–0	Al-Kahraba	Baghdad
	Riascos 90+12' (pen.)			Stadium: Al-Zawraa Stadium

31 March 2026 25	Erbil	1–1	Al-Zawraa	Erbil
	Cabrera 54'		Riascos 72'	Stadium: Franso Hariri Stadium

4 April 2026 26	Al-Zawraa	0–0	Al-Karma	Baghdad
				Stadium: Al-Zawraa Stadium

8 April 2026 27	Zakho	1–1	Al-Zawraa	Zakho
	Rostam 17'		Abdulkareem 80'	Stadium: Zakho Stadium

13 April 2026 28	Al-Shorta	1–2	Al-Zawraa	Baghdad
	Ateba 69' (pen.)		Ahmed 22', 29'	Stadium: Al-Shaab Stadium

18 April 2026 29	Al-Zawraa	3–0	Al-Karkh	Baghdad
	Sajjad Mahdi Mohammed 61'; Abdulkareem 90+2'; Murad Mohammed 90+8'			Stadium: Al-Zawraa Stadium

22 April 2026 30	Al-Zawraa	2–0	Diyala	Baghdad
	Amer Jamous 11'; Murad Mohammed 36'			Stadium: Al-Zawraa Stadium

26 April 2026 31	Amanat Baghdad	2–2	Al-Zawraa	Baghdad
	Kareem 66'; Talib 90+4'		Majid 63'; Aziz 77'	Stadium: Al-Madina Stadium

1 May 2026 32	Al-Zawraa	2–2	Duhok	Baghdad
	Hashim 12'; Murad Mohammed 89'		Al-Mandhar Al-Alawi 10'; Andre Alsanati 73'	Stadium: Al-Zawraa Stadium

5 May 2026 33	Al-Talaba	0–1	Al-Zawraa	Baghdad
			Abdulkareem 26'	Stadium: Al-Madina Stadium

10 May 2026 34	Al-Minaa	0–2	Al-Zawraa	Basra
			Tomiwa 71'; Raad 78' (pen.)	Stadium: Al-Minaa Olympic Stadium

14 May 2026 35	Al-Zawraa	1–1	Al-Qasim	Baghdad
	Riascos 39'		Abdulkhaleq 25'	Stadium: Al-Zawraa Stadium

20 May 2026 36	Al-Quwa Al-Jawiya	2–1	Al-Zawraa	Baghdad
	Jawad 85', 90+5'		Hiran 12'	Stadium: Al-Madina Stadium

27 May 2026 37	Al-Zawraa	0–1	Al-Naft	Baghdad
			Moses 34'	Stadium: Al-Zawraa Stadium

1 June 2026 38	Al-Najaf	1–0	Al-Zawraa	Najaf
	Jadaan 39' (o.g.)			Stadium: Al-Najaf International Stadium

=== AFC Champions League Two ===
==== Group stage ====
Pos	Team	Pld	W	D	L	GF	GA	GD	Pts	Qualification
1	(Saudi Arabia) Al-Nassr	6	6	0	0	22	2	+20	18	Round of 16
2	(Iraq) Al-Zawraa	6	3	0	3	8	11	−3	9	Round of 16
3	(Tajikistan) Istiklol	6	3	0	3	7	13	−6	9	
4	(India) Goa	6	0	0	6	3	14	−11	0	

Source: ACL2

17 September 2025 1	Goa (India)	0–2	(Iraq) Al-Zawraa	Jawaharlal Nehru Stadium, Margao
19:30 UTC+5:30		Report	Bani Hani 44'; Al-Rashdan 90+5'	Attendance: 8,756; Referee: Baraa Aisha (Palestine)

1 October 2025 2	Al-Zawraa (Iraq)	0–2	(Saudi Arabia) Al-Nassr	Al Zawraa Stadium, Baghdad
21:15 UTC+3		Report	Al-Khaibari 52'; Félix 81'	Attendance: 14,125; Referee: Salman Falahi (Qatar)

22 October 2025 3	Istiklol (Tajikistan)	2–1	(Iraq) Al-Zawraa	Hisor Central Stadium, Hisor
18:45 UTC+5	Juraboev 20'; Komolafe 84'	Report	Tomiwa 4'	Attendance: 6,420; Referee: Ahmed Al-Ali (Kuwait)

5 November 2025 4	Al-Zawraa (Iraq)	2–1	(Tajikistan) Istiklol	Al Zawraa Stadium, Baghdad
19:00 UTC+3	Abdulkareem 7'; Tomiwa 53' (pen.)	Report	Dzhuraboev 64' (pen.)	Referee: Ahmed Eisa Darwish (United Arab Emirates)

26 November 2025 5	Al-Zawraa (Iraq)	2–1	(India) Goa	Al Zawraa Stadium, Baghdad
19:00 UTC+3	Raad 38'; Abdulkareem 65'	Report	Ismail 51' (o.g.)	Referee: Firdavs Norsafarov (Uzbekistan)

24 December 2025 6	Al-Nassr (Saudi Arabia)	5–1	(Iraq) Al-Zawraa	Al-Awwal Park, Riyadh
19:00 UTC+3	Coman 12', 56'; Wesley 19'; Al-Amri 29'; João Félix 44'	Report	Tomiwa 50'	Attendance: 8,575; Referee: Fu Ming (China)

==== Round of 16 ====
10 February 2026 7	Al-Zawraa (Iraq)	3–2	(United Arab Emirates) Al Wasl	Al-Zawraa Stadium, Baghdad
19:00 UTC+3	Jamous 45+7'; Riascos 68', 76'	Report	Borja 5', 65'	Referee: Nasrullo Kabirov (Tajikistan)

17 February 2026 8	Al Wasl (United Arab Emirates)	4–2 (a.e.t.)	(Iraq) Al-Zawraa	Zabeel Stadium, Dubai
20:00 UTC+4	Palacios 46'; Borja 76'; Adryelson 90+3', 109'	Report	Gbadamosi 21', 65'	Attendance: 3,602; Referee: Alex King (Australia)
