= Alexander Aoraha =

Iraqi Assyrian footballer (born 2003)

Personal information
- Full name: Alexander Moaid Goria Aoraha
- Date of birth: 17 January 2003 (age 23)
- Place of birth: London, England
- Height: 5 ft 10 in (1.78 m)
- Position: Midfielder

Team information
- Current team: Al-Zawraa

Youth career
- 2014–2023: Queens Park Rangers

Senior career*
Years	Team	Apps	(Gls)
2023–2026	Queens Park Rangers	0	(0)
2024–2025	→ Ebbsfleet United (loan)	16	(0)
2026–	Al-Zawraa	0	(0)

International career^{‡}
2023	Iraq U20	5	(0)
2022–	Iraq U23	11	(5)
2022–	Iraq	1	(0)
- * Club domestic league appearances and goals as of 22 January 2026 ‡ National team caps and goals as of 12 November 2022

Alexander Moaid Goria Aoraha (Arabic: أليكساندر أوراها; born 17 January 2003) is a professional footballer who plays as a midfielder for Iraq Stars League club Al-Zawraa. Born in England, he represents Iraq internationally.

== Club career ==
=== Queens Park Rangers ===
Having joined the club aged eleven, Aoraha signed a two-year scholarship in July 2019. Following the conclusion of his scholarship, he signed a new contract following the conclusion of the 2020–21 season.

On 16 August 2023, Aoraha made his senior debut as a substitute in a 1–0 EFL Cup defeat to Norwich City. Having seen his progress stunted by an injury, he signed a new contract at the end of the 2023–24 season.

On 10 December 2024, Aoraha joined National League club Ebbsfleet United on a one-month loan deal.

=== Al-Zawraa ===
On 20 January 2026, Aoraha signed for Iraq Stars League club Al-Zawraa for an undisclosed fee.

== International career ==
=== Iraq U-23 ===
Eligible to represent England or Iraq internationally, through his father, a Chaldean Catholic Assyrian from Iraq, Alex chose to represent the latter.

Aoraha received his first call-up for the U-23s in January 2022 for a training camp in Antalya, Turkey in preparation for the 2022 AFC U-23 Asian Cup, during which he played every match. He has won 6 caps and scored 2 goals for the U-23s.

=== Iraq ===
After impressing with the U-23s, Aoraha received a call-up to the senior national team in November 2022, just 10 months after first being called up to the U-23s. He was an unused substitute in a friendly against Mexico and made his debut in the starting lineup against Ecuador on November 12.

== Career statistics ==
=== Club ===
As of 22 January 2026

Appearances and goals by club, season and competition
Club	Season	League			National Cup		League cup		Continental		Other		Total	
Club	Season	Division	Apps	Goals	Apps	Goals	Apps	Goals	Apps	Goals	Apps	Goals	Apps	Goals
Queens Park Rangers	2023–24	Championship	0	0	0	0	1	0	—		—		1	0
Queens Park Rangers	2024–25	Championship	0	0	0	0	0	0	—		—		0	0
Queens Park Rangers	2025–26	Championship	0	0	0	0	0	0	—		—		0	0
Queens Park Rangers	Total		0	0	0	0	1	0	0	0	0	0	1	0
Ebbsfleet United (loan)	2024–25	National League	16	0	0	0	—		—		2 (Note: Appearances in National League Cup)	0	18	0
Al-Zawraa	2025–26	Iraq Stars League	0	0	0	0	—		0	0	—		0	0
Career total			16	0	0	0	1	0	0	0	2	0	19	0

=== International ===
As of match played 12 November 2022

Appearances and goals by national team and year
National team	Year	Apps	Goals
Iraq	2022	1	0
Total		1	0
