= Chris Willock =

English footballer (born 1998)

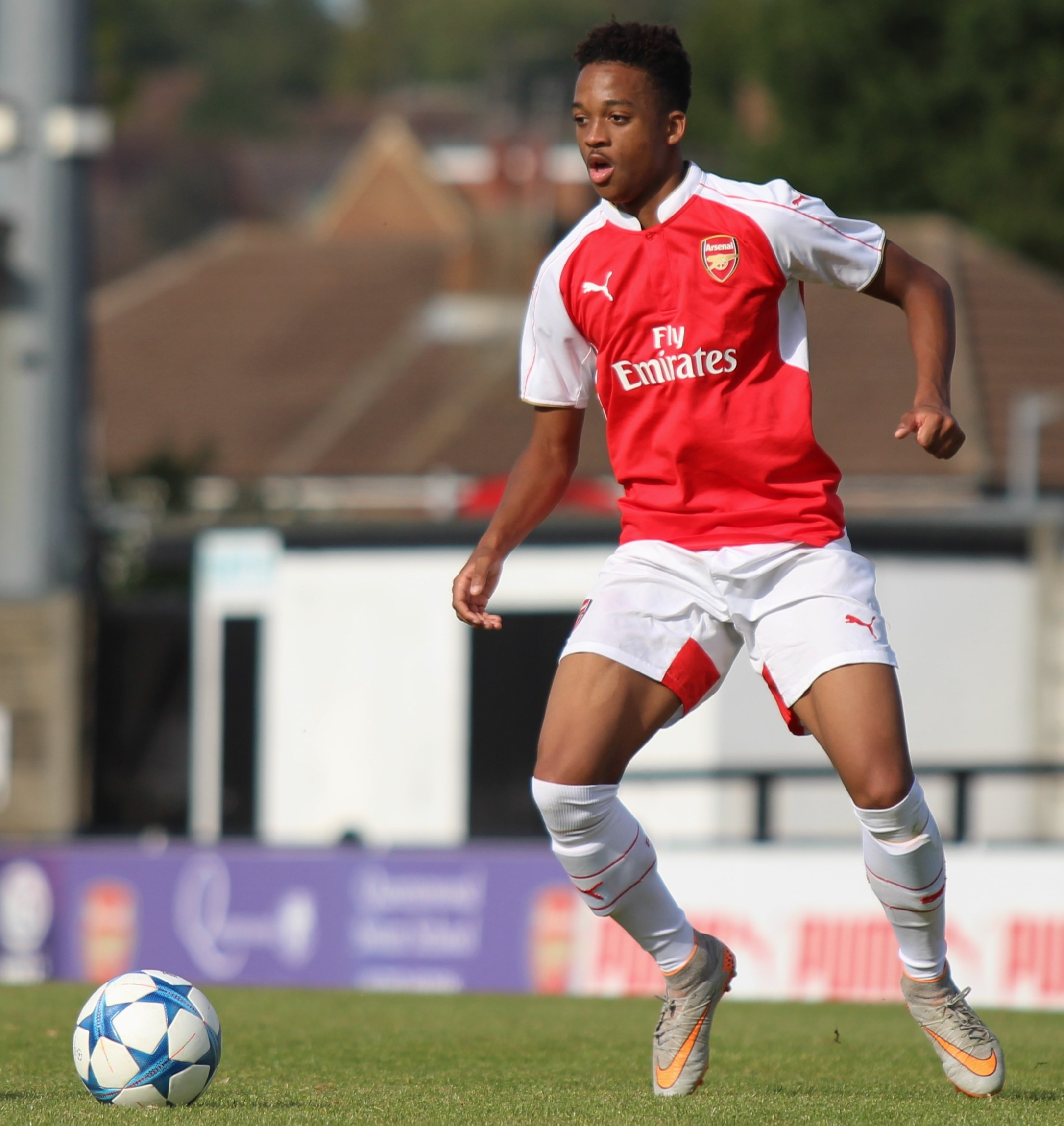
- Willock playing for Arsenal U19 in 2015

Personal information
- Full name: Christopher Anthony Willock
- Date of birth: 31 January 1998 (age 28)
- Place of birth: Waltham Forest, England
- Height: 1.78 m (5 ft 10 in)
- Position: Winger

Team information
- Current team: Cardiff City
- Number: 16

Youth career
- 2003–2016: Arsenal

Senior career*
| Years | Team | Apps | (Gls) |
| 2016–2017 | Arsenal | 0 | (0) |
| 2017–2020 | Benfica B | 64 | (14) |
| 2019–2020 | → West Bromwich Albion (loan) | 0 | (0) |
| 2020 | → Huddersfield Town (loan) | 14 | (2) |
| 2020–2024 | Queens Park Rangers | 140 | (20) |
| 2024– | Cardiff City | 89 | (10) |

International career^{‡}
| 2013–2014 | England U16 | 6 | (1) |
| 2014–2015 | England U17 | 18 | (2) |
| 2015–2016 | England U18 | 4 | (0) |
| 2016–2017 | England U19 | 10 | (3) |
| 2017–2018 | England U20 | 9 | (1) |
- * Club domestic league appearances and goals as of 8 November 2026 (UTC) ‡ National team caps and goals as of 10 September 2018

Christopher Anthony Willock (born 31 January 1998) is an English professional footballer who plays as a forward for EFL Championship club Cardiff City.

== Club career ==
=== Arsenal ===
Born in the London Borough of Waltham Forest, Willock joined Arsenal's academy when he was five years old. He, then aged 16, appeared for the Arsenal first team in a pre-season friendly in 2014 when Arsène Wenger described him as a "very interesting player". At the end of the 2015–16 season, he scored and provided two assists in a victory over Aston Villa in the U21 Premier League play-off final held at the Emirates Stadium. He made his first team debut on 20 September 2016 against Nottingham Forest in the League Cup.

=== Benfica ===
On 30 June 2017, Willock signed a five-year contract with Portuguese champions Benfica. He made his Benfica debut with the reserve team in a LigaPro match against Varzim on 23 August 2017.

==== West Bromwich Albion (loan) ====
On 8 August 2019, Willock joined West Bromwich Albion on a season-long loan with options to review the agreement in January; however, he did not make a single appearance for West Brom in the four months he was there.

==== Huddersfield Town (loan) ====
After struggling to break into the first team at West Brom, Willock joined Huddersfield Town on 31 January 2020. He went on to score 2 goals for the club with one of those being against West Brom, the team he had just been loaned at.

=== Queens Park Rangers ===
On 5 October 2020, Willock joined Championship side Queens Park Rangers for £750,000 on a three-year deal with an option for a further year. He scored his first goal for QPR in a 1–0 win over Cardiff City on 20 January 2021. On 10 December 2021, Willock was awarded the EFL Championship Player of the Month award for November 2021 after scoring three and assisting the other three of his side's six goals in the month. Willock's manager Mark Warburton was awarded the league's Manager of the Month award also. Willock ended the 2021–22 season with the Supporters' Player of the Year, Ray Jones Players' Player of the Year and Junior Hoops' Player of the Year awards.

The club exercised their contract extension for Willock at the end of the 2022–23 season.

=== Cardiff City ===
On 12 July 2024, following the expiration of his contract at Queens Park Rangers, Willock joined fellow Championship side Cardiff City on a three-year deal.

== Personal life ==
Willock has two brothers, Matty and Joe, who are also footballers. All three brothers shared a pitch when Manchester United played a reserve game against Arsenal in May 2017. Willock is of Montserratian descent.

== Career statistics ==
As of 18 October 2025

Appearances and goals by club, season and competition
| Club | Season | League | | | National cup (Note: Includes Taça de Portugal, FA Cup) | | League cup (Note: Includes Taça da Liga, EFL Cup) | | Other | | Total | |
| Club | Season | Division | Apps | Goals | Apps | Goals | Apps | Goals | Apps | Goals | Apps | Goals |
|---|---|---|---|---|---|---|---|---|---|---|---|---|
| Arsenal | 2016–17 | Premier League | 0 | 0 | 0 | 0 | 2 | 0 | — | | 2 | 0 |
| Benfica B | 2017–18 | Liga Portugal 2 | 30 | 3 | — | | — | | — | | 30 | 3 |
| Benfica B | 2018–19 | Liga Portugal 2 | 34 | 11 | — | | — | | — | | 34 | 11 |
| Benfica B | Total | | 64 | 14 | — | | — | | — | | 64 | 14 |
| West Bromwich Albion (loan) | 2019–20 | Championship | 0 | 0 | 0 | 0 | 0 | 0 | — | | 0 | 0 |
| Huddersfield Town (loan) | 2019–20 | Championship | 14 | 2 | 0 | 0 | 0 | 0 | — | | 14 | 2 |
| Queens Park Rangers | 2020–21 | Championship | 38 | 3 | 0 | 0 | 0 | 0 | — | | 38 | 3 |
| Queens Park Rangers | 2021–22 | Championship | 35 | 7 | 0 | 0 | 3 | 0 | — | | 38 | 7 |
| Queens Park Rangers | 2022–23 | Championship | 28 | 6 | 1 | 0 | 0 | 0 | — | | 29 | 6 |
| Queens Park Rangers | 2023–24 | Championship | 39 | 4 | 0 | 0 | 0 | 0 | — | | 39 | 4 |
| Queens Park Rangers | Total | | 140 | 20 | 1 | 0 | 3 | 0 | — | | 144 | 20 |
| Cardiff City | 2024–25 | Championship | 32 | 2 | 2 | 0 | 0 | 0 | — | | 34 | 2 |
| Cardiff City | 2025–26 | EFL League One | 11 | 2 | 0 | 0 | 3 | 0 | 1 | 0 | 15 | 2 |
| Cardiff City | Total | | 43 | 4 | 2 | 0 | 3 | 0 | 1 | 0 | 49 | 4 |
| Career total | | | 261 | 40 | 3 | 0 | 7 | 0 | 1 | 0 | 273 | 40 |

Arsenal Youth

- U21 Premier League 2 play-offs: 2016

Individual

- UEFA European U-17 Championship Team of the Tournament: 2015
- EFL Championship Player of the Month: November 2021
- Queens Park Rangers Supporters' Player of the Year: 2021–22
- Queens Park Rangers Players' Player of the Year: 2021–22
- Junior Hoops' Player of the Year: 2021–22
