= 2023–24 Queens Park Rangers F.C. season =

English football club season

Queens Park Rangers
2023–24 season
- Owner: Total Soccer Growth (51%); Tune Group (46%); Lakshmi Mittal (3%)
- Chairman: Amit Bhatia (until 1 November); Lee Hoos (from 1 November)
- Head Coach: Gareth Ainsworth (until 28 October); Martí Cifuentes (from 30 October)
- Stadium: Loftus Road Stadium
- EFL Championship: 18th
- FA Cup: Third round
- EFL Cup: First round
- Top goalscorer: League: Ilias Chair (7); All: Lyndon Dykes (7) & Ilias Chair (7)
- Highest home attendance: 17,831 vs. Norwich City (10 February, Championship)
- Lowest home attendance: 13,367 vs. Swansea City (19 September, Championship)
- Average home league attendance: 16,702
- Biggest win: 4–0 vs Leeds United, Championship, 26 April 2024
- Biggest defeat: 0-4 vs Blackburn Rovers, Championship, 7 October 2023
Home colours	Away colours

The 2023–24 season was the 142nd season in the history of Queens Park Rangers and their ninth consecutive season in the Championship. The club participated in the Championship, the FA Cup, and the EFL Cup.

== Current squad ==
As of 4 May 2024

No.	Name	Nat	Position	Since	Date of birth (age)	Signed from	Contract expires	Games	Goals
Goalkeepers
1	Asmir Begović	(Bosnia and Herzegovina)	GK	2023	20 June 1987 (age 39)	(England) Everton	2024	46	0
13	Jordan Archer	(Scotland)	GK	2021	12 April 1993 (age 33)	(England) Middlesbrough	2024	4	0
32	Joe Walsh	(England)	GK	2021	1 April 2002 (age 24)	(England) Gillingham	2024	2	0
40	Matteo Salamon	(England)	GK	2022	18 February 2004 (age 22)	(England) Queens Park Rangers Academy	2024	0	0
—	Murphy Mahoney	(England)	GK	2012	27 December 2001 (age 24)	(England) Wycombe Wanderers	2024	2	0
Defenders
2	Osman Kakay	(Sierra Leone)	RWB	2015	25 August 1997 (age 29)	(England) Queens Park Rangers Academy	2024	113	2
3	Jimmy Dunne	(Republic of Ireland)	CB	2021	19 October 1997 (age 29)	(England) Burnley	2024	115	6
5	Steve Cook	(England)	CB	2023	19 April 1991 (age 35)	(England) Nottingham Forest	2025	36	2
6	Jake Clarke-Salter	(England)	CB	2022	22 September 1997 (age 29)	(England) Chelsea	2026	49	1
15	Morgan Fox	(Wales)	LB/CB	2023	21 September 1993 (age 33)	(England) Stoke City	2025	21	1
20	Reggie Cannon	(United States)	RB	2023	11 June 1998 (age 28)	Free agent	2027	21	0
21	Ziyad Larkeche	(France)	LB/LM/CB	2023	19 September 2002 (age 24)	(England) Fulham	2026	22	0
22	Kenneth Paal	(Suriname)	LWB	2022	24 June 1997 (age 29)	(Netherlands) PEC Zwolle	2025	87	5
29	Aaron Drewe	(England)	RWB	2019	8 February 2001 (age 25)	(England) Queens Park Rangers Academy	2024	13	0
Midfielders
4	Jack Colback	(England)	CM	2023	24 October 1989 (age 37)	(England) Nottingham Forest	2025	28	3
7	Chris Willock	(England)	AM/RM/LM	2020	31 January 1998 (age 28)	(Portugal) Benfica	2024	146	20
8	Sam Field	(England)	CM/DM	2021	8 May 1998 (age 28)	(England) West Bromwich Albion	2026	141	8
10	Ilias Chair	(Morocco)	AM/RM/LM	2017	30 October 1997 (age 29)	(Belgium) Lierse	2025	236	35
14	Isaac Hayden	(England)	DM	2024	22 March 1995 (age 31)	(England) Newcastle United	Loan	17	0
16	Joe Hodge	(Republic of Ireland)	DM/CM	2024	14 September 2002 (age 24)	(England) Wolverhampton Wanderers	Loan	8	1
18	Taylor Richards	(England)	AM/RM/LM	2022	4 December 2000 (age 25)	(England) Brighton & Hove Albion	2026	21	0
19	Elijah Dixon-Bonner	(England)	CM	2022	1 January 2001 (age 25)	(England) Liverpool	2024	27	0
25	Lucas Andersen	(Denmark)	AM/LW/RW	2024	13 September 1994 (age 32)	(Denmark) AaB	2025	16	1
34	Rafferty Pedder	(England)	CM/AM	2022	6 April 2002 (age 24)	(England) Tottenham Hotspur	2024	1	0
36	Alexander Aoraha	(Iraq)	DM/CM	2021	17 January 2003 (age 23)	(England) Queens Park Rangers Academy	2024	1	0
37	Albert Adomah	(Ghana)	AM/RM/LM	2020	13 December 1987 (age 38)	(England) Nottingham Forest	2024	130	6
39	Steven Bala	(Albania)	AM/LM/CM	2021	19 November 2003 (age 22)	(England) Barnet	2024	0	0
41	Lorent Talla	(Kosovo)	CM/AM	2023	1 January 2005 (age 21)	(England) Queens Park Rangers Academy	2024	1	0
Forwards
9	Lyndon Dykes	(Scotland)	CF	2020	7 October 1995 (age 31)	(Scotland) Livingston	2026	163	36
11	Paul Smyth	(Northern Ireland)	RW/LW/AM	2023	10 September 1997 (age 29)	(England) Leyton Orient	2026	68	5
12	Michael Frey	(Switzerland)	CF	2024	19 July 1994 (age 32)	(Belgium) Royal Antwerp	2026	9	1
30	Sinclair Armstrong	(Republic of Ireland)	CF	2020	22 June 2003 (age 23)	(Republic of Ireland) Shamrock Rovers	2024	64	4
38	Rayan Kolli	(Algeria)	RW/LW/AM	2023	10 February 2005 (age 21)	(England) Queens Park Rangers Academy	2025	9	0
Out on Loan
17	Andre Dozzell	(England)	CM/AM/DM	2021	2 May 1999 (age 27)	(England) Ipswich Town	2024	98	2
23	Charlie Kelman	(United States)	CF	2020	2 November 2001 (age 25)	(England) Southend United	2024	26	0
24	Stephen Duke-McKenna	(Guyana)	RM/CM	2019	17 August 2000 (age 26)	(England) Bolton Wanderers	2024	10	0
28	Joe Gubbins	(England)	CB	2019	3 August 2001 (age 25)	(England) Queens Park Rangers Academy	2024	5	0
33	Trent Rendall	(England)	CB	2020	8 September 2001 (age 25)	(England) Queens Park Rangers Academy	2024	0	0

== Kit ==
Supplier: Erreà / Sponsor: Convivia

Home	Home alt.	Home alt.	Away

=== Kit information ===
QPR agreed a multi-year partnership with Erreà as the official technical kit suppliers, the 2023–24 season will be the seventh year of the deal. The kits will be 100 percent bespoke designs for the duration of the deal. On 8 December 2022 QPR announced that the kit deal with Erreà had been extended until the end of the 2025/26 season.

On 27 June 2022 Convivia were announced as the main shirt sponsor for the 2022–23 season on a three-year deal.

== Transfers ==
=== In ===
Date	Pos	Player	Transferred from	Fee	Ref
1 July 2023	LB	(France) Ziyad Larkeche	(England) Fulham	Free Transfer	
1 July 2023	CM	(England) Taylor Richards	(England) Brighton & Hove Albion	£300,000	
1 July 2023	RW	(Northern Ireland) Paul Smyth	(England) Leyton Orient	Free Transfer	
17 July 2023	GK	(Bosnia and Herzegovina) Asmir Begović	(England) Everton	Free Transfer	
24 July 2023	LB	(Wales) Morgan Fox	(England) Stoke City	Free Transfer	
1 August 2023	CM	(England) Jack Colback	(England) Nottingham Forest	Free Transfer	
9 August 2023	CB	(England) Steve Cook	(England) Nottingham Forest	Free	
6 September 2023	LB	(Slovakia) Casey Shann †	(England) Brighton & Hove Albion	Free Transfer	
26 September 2023	RB	(United States) Reggie Cannon	Free agent	—N/a	
28 January 2024	CF	(Switzerland) Michael Frey	(Belgium) Royal Antwerp	Free Transfer	
5 February 2024	AM	(Denmark) Lucas Andersen	(Denmark) AaB	Free Transfer	

† Signed initially for the Development Squad

=== Out ===
Date	Pos	Player	Transferred to	Fee	Ref
14 June 2023	CB	(England) Robert Dickie	(England) Bristol City	Undisclosed	
19 June 2023	CM	(Norway) Stefan Johansen	(Norway) Sarpsborg	Mutual Consent	
29 June 2023	LB	(Finland) Niko Hämäläinen	(Finland) HJK Helsinki	Mutual Consent	
30 June 2023	LW	(Nigeria) Ody Alfa	(England) Chelmsford City	Released	
30 June 2023	DM	(England) Luke Amos	(Scotland) Hibernian	Released	
30 June 2023	RB	(England) Elijah Anthony	(England) Beaconsfield Town	Released	
30 June 2023	LB	(England) Sam Bagan	Free agent	Released	
30 June 2023	CB	(Nigeria) Leon Balogun	(Scotland) Rangers	End of Contract	
30 June 2023	CM	(England) Shannon Brown	Free agent	Released	
30 June 2023	CM	(England) Matthew Castillo-Anderson	Free agent	Released	
30 June 2023	CM	(Trinidad and Tobago) Jabari Christmas	Free agent	Released	
30 June 2023	DM	(England) Riley Cotter	Free agent	Released	
30 June 2023	LW	(Sri Lanka) Dillon De Silva	(England) Torquay United	Released	
30 June 2023	LW	(Algeria) Adam Dougui	Free agent	Released	
30 June 2023	AM	(England) Stanley Flaherty	(England) Walton & Hersham	Released	
30 June 2023	GK	(Republic of Ireland) Harry Halwax	Free agent	Released	
30 June 2023	CM	(Pakistan) Harun Hamid	Free agent	Released	
30 June 2023	DF	(England) Moses Luzinda	Free agent	Released	
30 June 2023	DF	(Italy) Salvatore Marino	Free agent	Released	
30 June 2023	CF	(Scotland) Chris Martin	(England) Bristol Rovers	End of Contract	
30 June 2023	CB	(Republic of Ireland) Conor Masterson	(England) Gillingham	Released	
30 June 2023	CB	(England) Charlie McDonald	Free agent	Released	
30 June 2023	LW	(England) Reece Nicholas-Davies	Free agent	Released	
30 June 2023	DM	(Northern Ireland) Charlie Owens	(England) Boreham Wood	Released	
30 June 2023	LB	(Scotland) Isaac Pitblado	Free agent	Released	
30 June 2023	CB	(Italy) Ivo Rossi	(Italy) Luparense	Released	
30 June 2023	LW	(Republic of Ireland) Olamide Shodipo	(England) Lincoln City	Released	
30 June 2023	RB	(Brazil) Guilherme Siqueira	(England) Sheffield Wednesday	Released	
30 June 2023	GK	(Poland) Kacper Zapieraczynski	Free agent	Released	
8 July 2023	GK	(Senegal) Seny Dieng	(England) Middlesbrough	£2,000,000	
17 January 2024	CB	(Grenada) Kayden Harrack	(England) Morecambe	Released	

=== Loaned in ===
Date from	Pos	Player	Loaned from	Date until	Ref
1 February 2024	DM	(England) Isaac Hayden	(England) Newcastle United	End of Season	
1 February 2024	DM	(Republic of Ireland) Joe Hodge	(England) Wolverhampton Wanderers	End of Season	

=== Loaned out ===
Date	Pos	Player	Loaned to	Fee	Ref
1 July 2023	GK	(England) Murphy Mahoney	(England) Swindon Town	28 December 2023 (Note: On 28 December, Mahoney returned from his loan at Swindon early due to picking up an injury.)	
25 August 2023	CB	(England) Joe Gubbins	(England) Accrington Stanley	End of Season	
1 September 2023	CB	(England) Trent Rendall	(England) Eastleigh	30 September 2023	
17 September 2023	CB	(England) Henry Hawkins	(England) Farnborough	1 January 2024	
7 October 2023	CM	(England) Rafferty Pedder	(England) Oxford City	4 November 2023	
21 November 2023	AM	(Albania) Steven Bala	(England) Slough Town	19 December 2023	
21 November 2023	GK	(England) Harry Cant	(England) Ashford Town	16 January 2024	
7 December 2023	GK	(England) Joe Walsh	(England) Accrington Stanley	22 December 2023 (Note: On 15 December, Walsh's loan at Accrington was extended by a further seven-days.)	
19 January 2024	CM	(England) Andre Dozzell	(England) Birmingham City	End of Season	
25 January 2024	RM	(Guyana) Stephen Duke-McKenna	(England) Sutton United	End of Season	
31 January 2024	CF	(United States) Charlie Kelman	(England) Wigan Athletic	End of Season	
1 February 2024	CB	(England) Deon Woodman	(England) Wealdstone	29 February 2024	
6 February 2024	CM	(England) Arkell Jude-Boyd	(England) Torquay United	5 March 2024	
23 February 2024	GK	(Republic of Ireland) Conor Clark	(England) Woodley United	23 March 2024	
5 March 2024	CB	(England) Deon Woodman	(England) Southend United	End of Season (Note: On 29 March, Woodman's loan at Southend was extended until the end of season.)	
26 March 2024	CB	(England) Trent Rendall	(England) Braintree Town	30 April 2024	
29 March 2024	GK	(England) Harry Cant	(England) Haringey Borough	16 April 2024	

== Pre-season and friendlies ==
On 24 May the club announced their first pre-season friendly, against Oxford United. A day later, a second friendly was confirmed, against AFC Wimbledon. A third pre-season game was confirmed, against Reading in a behind-closed-doors fixture. On June 7, the club confirmed a pre-season training camp in Austria and face Slavia Prague and Vorwärts Steyr.

Win Draw Loss Fixtures

8 July 2023 Friendly	Slavia Prague	3–0	Queens Park Rangers	Rohrbach-Berg, Austria
17:00 CEST; 16:00 BST	Provod 14'; Dorley 17' van Buren 67'	Report		Stadium: Raiffeisen Arena

15 July 2023 Friendly	Vorwärts Steyr	1–2	Queens Park Rangers	Steyr, Austria
17:00 CEST; 16:00 BST	Kolb 14'	Report	Dykes 32' (pen.); Armstrong 73'	Stadium: Liwest Arena

22 July 2023 Friendly	AFC Wimbledon	1–1	Queens Park Rangers	Wimbledon
15:00 BST	Neufville 50'	Report	Dykes 3'	Stadium: Cherry Red Records Stadium

25 July 2023 Friendly	Reading	0–2	Queens Park Rangers	Wokingham
13:00 BST		Report	Kelman 23'; Richards 90+2'	Stadium: Bearwood Park

29 July 2023 Friendly	Oxford United	5–0	Queens Park Rangers	Oxford
15:00 BST	Brannagan 34'; Harris 59'; Browne 66'; Mills 72'; Thorniley 82'	Report		Stadium: Kassam Stadium

== Competitions ==
=== Overall record ===
Competition	Starting round	Final position	Record							
Competition	Starting round	Final position	Pld	W	D	L	GF	GA	GD	Win %
Championship	Matchday 1		46	15	11	20	47	58	−11	32.61
FA Cup	Third round	Third round	1	0	0	1	2	3	−1	0.00
EFL Cup	First round	First round	1	0	0	1	0	1	−1	0.00
Total			48	15	11	22	49	62	−13	31.25

Last updated: 6 May 2024
Source: Soccerway

=== Sky Bet Championship ===
==== League table ====
Pos	Team	Pld	W	D	L	GF	GA	GD	Pts
15	Watford	46	13	17	16	61	61	0	56
16	Sunderland	46	16	8	22	52	54	−2	56
17	Stoke City	46	15	11	20	49	60	−11	56
18	Queens Park Rangers	46	15	11	20	47	58	−11	56
19	Blackburn Rovers	46	14	11	21	60	74	−14	53
20	Sheffield Wednesday	46	15	8	23	44	68	−24	53
21	Plymouth Argyle	46	13	12	21	59	70	−11	51

Source: EFL official website
Rules for classification: 1) Points; 2) Goal difference; 3) Number of goals scored; 4) Head-to-head results; 5) Wins; 6) Away goals; 7) Penalty points (sec 9.5); 8) Number of 12-point sending off offences; 9) Play-off (only if needed to determine promotion/relegation)

==== Results summary ====
Overall								Home						Away					
Pld	W	D	L	GF	GA	GD	Pts	W	D	L	GF	GA	GD	W	D	L	GF	GA	GD
45	14	11	20	45	57	−12	53	7	6	10	28	32	−4	7	5	10	17	25	−8

Last updated: 22 April 2024.
Source: Soccerway

==== Results by round ====
Round	1	2	3	4	5	6	7	8	9	10	11	12	13	14	15	16	17	18	19	20	21	22	23	24	25	26	27	28	29	30	31	32	33	34	35	36	37	38	39	40	41	42	43	44	45	46
Ground	A	A	H	A	A	H	H	A	H	A	H	A	A	H	A	H	A	H	A	H	H	A	H	A	A	H	H	H	H	A	H	A	A	H	A	H	H	A	H	A	H	A	A	H	H	A
Result	L	W	L	L	W	L	D	D	L	L	L	L	L	L	D	D	L	W	W	W	D	L	L	L	D	L	L	W	D	W	D	L	W	W	W	D	L	D	W	W	L	D	L	W	W	W
Position	24	16	17	19	17	20	20	19	22	22	22	22	23	23	23	23	23	22	22	22	22	22	22	22	22	23	23	22	22	22	22	22	22	21	19	19	20	20	18	16	17	16	19	18	17	18

Updated to match(es) played on 26 April 2024. Source: Soccerway
A = Away; H = Home; W = Win; D = Draw; L = Loss

==== Matches ====
On 22 June, the EFL Championship fixtures were released.

Win Draw Loss Fixtures

5 August 2023 1	Watford	4–0	Queens Park Rangers	Watford
15:00 BST	Dele-Bashiru 1'; Louza 20'; Martins 38'; Bayo 43'; Morris (yellow card) 45+1'	Report	Armstrong (yellow card) 67'; Field (yellow card) 76'	Stadium: Vicarage Road; Attendance: 20,087; Referee: Thomas Bramall

12 August 2023 2	Cardiff City	1–2	Queens Park Rangers	Leckwith
15:00 BST	Adams (yellow card) 25'; Ugbo 78'; Bowler (yellow card) 83'	Report	Armstrong (yellow card) 27' (goal) 34'; Paal 65'; Adomah (yellow card) 90'	Stadium: Cardiff City Stadium; Attendance: 21,230; Referee: Oliver Langford

19 August 2023 3	Queens Park Rangers	0–1	Ipswich Town	Shepherd's Bush
15:00 BST	Smyth (yellow card) 20'; Chair (yellow card) 51'; Field (yellow card) 55'; Colback (yellow card) 90+8'	Report	Luongo (yellow card) 21'; Chaplin 75'	Stadium: Loftus Road Stadium; Attendance: 16,790; Referee: Geoff Eltringham

26 August 2023 4	Southampton	2–1	Queens Park Rangers	Southampton
15:00 BST	Manning (yellow card) 11'; S. Armstrong (yellow card) 19'; Alcaraz (yellow card) 29'; Edozie 30'; A. Armstrong 64'; Fraser (yellow card) 90+3'	Report	Colback 32'; Duke-McKenna (yellow card) 88'; Field (yellow card) 89'	Stadium: St Mary's Stadium; Attendance: 30,401; Referee: James Bell

2 September 2023 5	Middlesbrough	0–2	Queens Park Rangers	Middlesbrough
15:00 BST	Greenwood (yellow card) 77'	Report	Dozzell 43'; Colback (yellow card) 50' (goal) 71'; Chair (yellow card) 65'	Stadium: Riverside Stadium; Attendance: 25,671; Referee: Thomas Bramall

16 September 2023 6	Queens Park Rangers	1–3	Sunderland	Shepherd's Bush
15:00 BST	Paal 12'; Colback (red card) 21'; Armstrong (yellow card) 33'; Kakay (yellow card) 79'	Report	Clarke 45+8'; Ballard 57'; Ba 81'	Stadium: Loftus Road Stadium; Attendance: 16,383; Referee: Dean Whitestone

19 September 2023 7	Queens Park Rangers	1–1	Swansea City	Shepherd's Bush
19:45 BST	Kakay (yellow card) 67'; Dykes 90+2'	Report	Wood (yellow card) 5'; Ginnelly 7'; Cooper (yellow card) 90+7' (yellow-red card) 90+8'	Stadium: Loftus Road Stadium; Attendance: 13,367; Referee: Andrew Kitchen

22 September 2023 8	Birmingham City	0–0	Queens Park Rangers	Bordesley
20:00 BST	Bacuna (yellow card) 54'; Sanderson (yellow card) 67'; Stansfield (yellow card) 90'	Report	Field (yellow card) 45'; Smyth (yellow card) 61'	Stadium: St Andrew's Stadium; Referee: Matt Donohue

30 September 2023 9	Queens Park Rangers	1–3	Coventry City	Shepherd's Bush
15:00 BST	Smyth (yellow card) 53'; Armstrong (yellow card) 63'; Cook (yellow card) 65'; Dozzell (yellow card) 77'; Paal 90'	Report	Dasilva (yellow card) 51'; Simms 56', 68'; Eccles 60'; Allen (yellow card) 75'	Stadium: Loftus Road Stadium; Attendance: 16,293; Referee: Tom Nield

4 October 2023 10	Leeds United	1–0	Queens Park Rangers	Leeds
19:45 BST	Summerville 9'	Report	Field (yellow card) 26'; Kakay (yellow card) 69'; Begović (red card) 90+3'	Stadium: Elland Road; Attendance: 32,663; Referee: David Webb

7 October 2023 11	Queens Park Rangers	0–4	Blackburn Rovers	Shepherd's Bush
15:00 BST	Clarker-Salter (yellow card) 22'; Smyth (yellow card) 90+3'	Report	Dolan 19'; Sigurðsson 23', 59'; Szmodics (yellow card) 43' (goal) 66'; Gilsenan (yellow card) 90'	Stadium: Loftus Road Stadium; Attendance: 15,376; Referee: Josh Smith

21 October 2023 12	Huddersfield Town	2–1	Queens Park Rangers	Huddersfield
15:00 BST	Harratt 8'; Rudoni 14'; Burgzorg (yellow card) 47'; Nakayama (yellow card) 85'	Report	Chair (yellow card) 34'; Clarke-Salter 42'; Colback (yellow card) 45+4'	Stadium: John Smith's Stadium; Attendance: 18,010; Referee: Gavin Ward

24 October 2023 13	West Bromwich Albion	2–0	Queens Park Rangers	West Bromwich
20:00 BST	Thomas-Asante 59' (pen.) (yellow card) 66'; Diangana 68'	Report	Colback (yellow card) 30'; Chair (yellow card) 40'; Dunne (yellow card) 56' (yellow-red card) 58'	Stadium: Hawthorns; Attendance: 21,745 (676 away); Referee: James Bell

28 October 2023 14	Queens Park Rangers	1–2	Leicester City	Shepherd's Bush
15:00 BST	Dozzell 40', (yellow card) 59' (yellow-red card) 59'; Colback (yellow card) 66'	Report	Mavididi 30'; Fatawu (yellow card) 59'; Winks 80'; Pereira (yellow card) 90+2'	Stadium: Loftus Road; Attendance: 17,385; Referee: Leigh Doughty

4 November 2023 15	Rotherham United	1–1	Queens Park Rangers	Rotherham
15:00 GMT	Bramall (yellow card) 21'; Clucas (yellow card) 37'; Kelly 70'	Report	Chair (yellow card) 19' (goal) 50'	Stadium: AESSEAL New York Stadium; Attendance: 10,199; Referee: Sam Barrott

11 November 2023 16	Queens Park Rangers	0–0	Bristol City	Shepherd's Bush
15:00 GMT	Smyth (yellow card) 63'; Field (yellow card) 67'	Report	Pring (yellow card) 59'; Knight (yellow card) 67'	Stadium: Loftus Road; Attendance: 17,540; Referee: Geoff Eltringham

25 November 2023 17	Norwich City	1–0	Queens Park Rangers	Norwich
15:00 GMT	Hwang Ui-jo 21'; Gabriel Sara (yellow card) 77'; Fassnacht (yellow card) 84'; McLean (yellow card) 90'; Barnes (yellow card) 90+5'	Report	Colback (yellow card) 48'; Willock (yellow card) 72'; Dozzell (yellow card) 80'; Cook (yellow card) 90+3'	Stadium: Carrow Road; Attendance: 25,650; Referee: Stephen Martin

28 November 2023 18	Queens Park Rangers	4–2	Stoke City	Shepherd's Bush
19:45 GMT	Dykes 11' (pen.) 79'; Colback (yellow card) 86'; Pearson 89' (o.g.); Willock 90+4'; Begovic (yellow card) 90+6'	Report	Stevens (yellow card) 10' (yellow-red card) 53'; Burger (yellow card) 19' (goal) 59'; Mmaee 45' (yellow card) 56'; Campbell (yellow card) 56'; Gooch (yellow card) 74'; Johnson (yellow card) 82'	Stadium: Loftus Road; Attendance: 16,901; Referee: James Linington

1 December 2023 19	Preston North End	0–2	Queens Park Rangers	Preston
20:00 GMT	Woodburn (yellow card) 90+3'	Report	Dykes (yellow card) 22'; Smyth 55'; Willock 87'	Stadium: Deepdale; Attendance: 14,280; Referee: Josh Smith

9 December 2023 20	Queens Park Rangers	2–0	Hull City	Shepherd's Bush
15:00 GMT	Willock 45+1'; Dykes (yellow card) 70'; Chair 73'	Report	Philogene (yellow card) 51'; Seri (yellow card) 70'; Delap (yellow card) 87'	Stadium: MATRADE Loftus Road; Attendance: 16,967; Referee: James Bell

13 December 2023 21	Queens Park Rangers	0–0	Plymouth Argyle	Shepherd's Bush
19:45 GMT	Field (yellow card) 2'; Paal (yellow card) 31'	Report	Scarr (red card) 25'; Cundle (yellow card) 86'; Butcher (yellow card) 90+3'; Hazard (yellow card) 90+6'	Stadium: MATRADE Loftus Road; Attendance: 16,339; Referee: Tony Harrington

16 December 2023 22	Sheffield Wednesday	2–1	Queens Park Rangers	Owlerton
15:00 GMT	Bernard (yellow card) 57'; Bannan (yellow card) 64'; Vaulks (yellow card) 78'; Cadamarteri 86'; Musaba 90+4' (yellow card) 90+5'; Palmer (yellow card) 90+7'	Report	Cannon (yellow card) 14'; Diaby 37' (o.g.); Smyth (yellow card) 64'; Dozzell (yellow card) 72'; Field (yellow card) 82'	Stadium: Hillsborough; Attendance: 24,739; Referee: Andy Davies

23 December 2023 23	Queens Park Rangers	0–1	Southampton	Shepherd's Bush
15:00 GMT	Dixon-Bonner (yellow card) 45+2'	Report	Harwood-Bellis 42'; Aribo (yellow card) 45+2'; Charles (yellow card) 68' (yellow-red card) 89'; Adams (yellow card) 71'; Stephens (yellow card) 90+3'	Stadium: MATRADE Loftus Road; Attendance: 17,745; Referee: Oliver Langford

26 December 2023 24	Millwall	2–0	Queens Park Rangers	Bermondsey
13:00 GMT	Emakhu (yellow card) 32'; Honeyman (yellow card) 44'; Bradshaw 45+3'; Wallace 90+1', (yellow card) 90+3'	Report	Dunne (yellow card) 9'; Smyth (yellow card) 37'; Chair (yellow card) 75'	Stadium: The Den; Attendance: 17,432; Referee: Thomas Bramall

29 December 2023 25	Ipswich Town	0–0	Queens Park Rangers	Ipswich
19:45 GMT	Chaplin (yellow card) 35'; Woolfenden (yellow card) 52'; Harness (yellow card) 86'	Report	Begović (yellow card) 83'; Larkeche (yellow card) 90'	Stadium: Portman Road; Attendance: 29,100; Referee: David Webb

1 January 2024 26	Queens Park Rangers	1–2	Cardiff City	Shepherd's Bush
15:00 GMT	Smyth 52'; Fox (yellow card) 85'; Dykes (yellow card) 90+2'	Report	Goutas 16'; McGuinness (yellow card) 58'; Collins (yellow card) 63'; Ng 74', (yellow card) 89'; Adams (yellow card) 90+1'; Panzo (yellow card) 90+6'	Stadium: MATRADE Loftus Road; Attendance: 16,849; Referee: Andrew Kitchen

14 January 2024 27	Queens Park Rangers	1–2	Watford	Shepherd's Bush
12:00 GMT	Field (yellow card) 5'; Paal (yellow card) 23'; Colback (yellow card) 39'; Dykes 77'	Report	Livermore (yellow card) 20'; Hoedt (yellow card) 45'; Dele-Bashiru (yellow card) 49'; Livermore 60', 65'	Stadium: MATRADE Loftus Road; Attendance: 17,409; Referee: Simon Hooper
Note: Fixture was originally scheduled for 13 January, but was moved for TV coverage.

20 January 2024 28	Queens Park Rangers	2–0	Millwall	Shepherd's Bush
15:00 GMT	Chair 27'; Armstrong 85'	Report	Mitchell (yellow card) 32'; Flemming (yellow card) 85'	Stadium: MATRADE Loftus Road; Attendance: 17,184; Referee: Robert Madley

28 January 2024 29	Queens Park Rangers	1–1	Huddersfield Town	Shepherd's Bush
13:30 GMT	Drewe (yellow card) 18'; Clarke-Salter (yellow card) 23'; Field (yellow card) 64'; Colback (yellow card) 86'; Paal 90+5'	Report	Helik (yellow card) 17'; Rudoni 86'; Spencer (yellow card) 90+2'; Radulović (yellow card) 90+3'	Stadium: MATRADE Loftus Road; Attendance: 16,483; Referee: Stephen Martin
Note: Fixture was originally scheduled for 27 January, but was moved for live Sky Sports coverage.

3 February 2024 30	Blackburn Rovers	1–2	Queens Park Rangers	Blackburn
15:00 GMT	Tronstad (yellow card) 39'; Gallagher 73'; Ayari (yellow card) 90+9'	Report	Armstrong (yellow card) 41'; Dixon-Bonner (yellow card) 54'; Pears 61' (o.g.); Hodge 64'; Begović (yellow card) 90+4'	Stadium: Ewood Park; Attendance: 12,888; Referee: Geoff Eltringham

10 February 2024 31	Queens Park Rangers	2–2	Norwich City	Shepherd's Bush
15:00 GMT	Colback 27'; Frey 77'; Chair (yellow card) 79'; Clarke-Salter (yellow card) 87'	Report	Gibson (yellow card) 25'; McLean 48', (yellow card) 52'; Sargent 62'; Hanley (yellow card) 76'; McCallum (yellow card) 90+7'	Stadium: Loftus Road; Attendance: 17,831; Referee: Ben Toner

14 February 2024 32	Stoke City	1–0	Queens Park Rangers	Stoke-on-Trent
19:45 GMT	Burger 45'	Report	Hayden (yellow card) 64'	Stadium: bet365 Stadium; Attendance: 19,307; Referee: Andrew Kitchen

17 February 2024 33	Bristol City	0–1	Queens Park Rangers	Bristol
15:00 GMT		Report	Hayden (yellow card) 37'; Chair 41'	Stadium: Ashton Gate; Attendance: 23,619; Referee: Sam Barrott

24 February 2024 34	Queens Park Rangers	2–1	Rotherham United	Shepherd's Bush
15:00 GMT	Hayden (yellow card) 33'; Hodge (yellow card) 42'; Colback (yellow card) 54'; Smyth 61', (yellow card) 90+1'; Willock 75'	Report	Eaves 7'; Humphreys (yellow card) 38'	Stadium: MATRADE Loftus Road; Attendance: 16,351; Referee: Matt Donohue

2 March 2024 35	Leicester City	1–2	Queens Park Rangers	Leicester
15:00 GMT	Nelson 60', (yellow card) 90+1'; Choudhury (yellow card) 84'	Report	Chair 38'; Andersen (yellow card) 43'; Dykes (yellow card) 54'; Armstrong 57'; Cook (yellow card) 90+4'	Stadium: King Power Stadium; Attendance: 31,439; Referee: Andy Davies

6 March 2024 36	Queens Park Rangers	2–2	West Bromwich Albion	Shepherd's Bush
20:00 GMT	Field 17', 81'; Frey (penalty missed) 51'	Report	Johnston 25'; Diangana 27'; Palmer (yellow card) 55'	Stadium: MATRADE Loftus Road; Attendance: 16,818; Referee: Geoff Eltringham
Note: Fixture was initially scheduled for a 19:45 kick-off, but was pushed back fifteen minutes for live Sky Sports coverage.

9 March 2024 37	Queens Park Rangers	0–2	Middlesbrough	Shepherd's Bush
15:00 GMT	Hayden (yellow card) 64'; Clarke-Salter (yellow card) 81'	Report	Forss (yellow card) 39' (goal) 76'; Latte Lath 64'; Engel (yellow card) 66'; Ayling (yellow card) 80'; Dieng (yellow card) 90+2'; McNair (yellow card) 90+3'	Stadium: MATRADE Loftus Road; Attendance: 16,689; Referee: Leigh Doughty

16 March 2024 38	Sunderland	0–0	Queens Park Rangers	Sunderland
15:00 GMT	Hume (yellow card) 73'	Report	Dunne (yellow card) 45'; Willock (yellow card) 87'	Stadium: Stadium of Light; Attendance: 41,478; Referee: Oliver Langford

29 March 2024 39	Queens Park Rangers	2–1	Birmingham City	Shepherd's Bush
15:00 GMT	Hayden (yellow card) 58'; Cook 65'; Colback (yellow card) 74'; Dunne 90+2'	Report	Laird (yellow card) 47'; Roberts (yellow card) 51'; Bacuna 62'	Stadium: Loftus Road; Attendance: 17,170; Referee: Josh Smith

1 April 2024 40	Swansea City	0–1	Queens Park Rangers	Landore
15:00 BST		Report	Cook 71'	Stadium: Swansea.com Stadium; Attendance: 19,704; Referee: Sam Allison

6 April 2024 41	Queens Park Rangers	0–2	Sheffield Wednesday	Shepherd's Bush
15:00 BST	Hayden (yellow card) 40'; Dykes (yellow card) 76'; Andersen (yellow card) 90+5'	Report	Windass (yellow card) 40'; Palmer (yellow card) 43'; Gassama 59'; Bannan (yellow card) 90+1'; Musaba 90+6'	Stadium: Loftus Road; Attendance: 17,502; Referee: Graham Scott

9 April 2024 42	Plymouth Argyle	1–1	Queens Park Rangers	Plymouth
19:45 BST	Adomah 85' (o.g.)	Report	Dykes (yellow card) 42'; Field 73'; Willock (yellow card) 90+6'	Stadium: Home Park; Attendance: 16,928; Referee: Jeremy Simpson

13 April 2024 43	Hull City	3–0	Queens Park Rangers	Kingston upon Hull
15:00 BST	Tufan 8'; Carvalho 27'; Philogene 52'; Slater (yellow card) 75'; Morton (yellow card) 78'	Report	Dunne (yellow card) 36'	Stadium: MKM Stadium; Attendance: 21,225; Referee: Tom Nield

20 April 2024 44	Queens Park Rangers	1–0	Preston North End	Shepherd's Bush
17:15 BST	Dykes 20' (yellow card) 87'; Colback (yellow card) 36'	Report	Brady (yellow card) 58'; Ledson (yellow card) 68'; Hughes (yellow card) 76'; Storey (yellow card) 87'	Stadium: Loftus Road; Attendance: 16,464; Referee: Gavin Ward
Note: Fixture was initially scheduled for a 15:00 kick-off, but was moved for live Sky Sports coverage.

26 April 2024 45	Queens Park Rangers	4–0	Leeds United	Shepherd's Bush
20:00 BST	Chair 8'; Andersen 22'; Colback (yellow card) 64'; Dykes 73'; Field 86'	Report	Byram (yellow card) 17'; Gnonto (yellow card) 41'	Stadium: Loftus Road; Attendance: 16,677; Referee: Darren Bond
Note: Fixture was initially scheduled for 27 April, but was moved for live Sky Sports coverage.

4 May 2024 46	Coventry City	1–2	Queens Park Rangers	Coventry
12:30 BST	Allen 83'	Report	Chair 33'; Fox 40'	Stadium: Coventry Building Society Arena; Attendance: 29,102; Referee: Joshua Smith

=== Emirates FA Cup ===
Queens Park Rangers joined the FA Cup at the third round stage, as a Championship side, and were drawn at home to Bournemouth.

Win Draw Loss Fixtures

6 January 2024 Third round	Queens Park Rangers	2–3	Bournemouth (Premier League)	Shepherd's Bush
15:00 GMT	Armstrong 40'; Dykes 42'	Report	Billing (yellow card) 17'; Tavernier 48'; Moore 58'; Aarons (yellow card) 59'; Kluivert 69'; Cook (yellow card) 87'	Stadium: Loftus Road; Attendance: 10,725; Referee: Rebecca Welch

=== Carabao Cup ===
QPR were drawn at home to Norwich City in the first round.

Win Draw Loss Fixtures

16 August 2023 First round	Queens Park Rangers	0–1	Norwich City (Championship)	Shepherd's Bush
19:45 BST	Field (yellow card) 24'	Report	Omobamidele (yellow card) 61'; Rowe 90+9'	Stadium: Loftus Road; Attendance: 7,813; Referee: James Linington

== Squad statistics ==
=== Statistics ===
As of 27 April 2024

No.	Pos	Nat	Player	Total		Sky Bet Championship		Carabao Cup		Emirates FA Cup	
No.	Pos	Nat	Player	Apps	Goals	Apps	Goals	Apps	Goals	Apps	Goals
1	GK	(Bosnia and Herzegovina) BIH	Asmir Begović	46	0	45	0	0	0	1	0
2	DF	(Sierra Leone) SLE	Osman Kakay	25	0	18+5	0	1	0	0+1	0
3	DF	(Republic of Ireland) IRL	Jimmy Dunne	30	1	26+3	1	0	0	1	0
4	MF	(England) ENG	Jack Colback	28	3	24+4	3	0	0	0	0
5	DF	(England) ENG	Steve Cook	36	2	35+1	2	0	0	0	0
6	DF	(England) ENG	Jake Clarke-Salter	33	1	29+4	1	0	0	0	0
7	MF	(England) ENG	Chris Willock	39	4	27+12	4	0	0	0	0
8	MF	(England) ENG	Sam Field	45	4	39+4	4	1	0	1	0
9	FW	(Scotland) SCO	Lyndon Dykes	43	7	31+10	6	1	0	1	1
10	MF	(Morocco) MAR	Ilias Chair	43	7	42+1	7	0	0	0	0
11	FW	(Northern Ireland) NIR	Paul Smyth	44	3	22+21	3	0	0	1	0
12	FW	(Switzerland) SUI	Michael Frey	9	1	4+5	1	0	0	0	0
13	GK	(Scotland) SCO	Jordan Archer	1	0	0	0	1	0	0	0
14	MF	(England) ENG	Isaac Hayden	17	0	12+5	0	0	0	0	0
15	DF	(England) ENG	Morgan Fox	21	1	13+7	1	0	0	1	0
15	DF	(Republic of Ireland) IRL	Joe Hodge	8	1	4+4	1	0	0	0	0
17	MF	(England) ENG	Andre Dozzell	27	2	22+3	2	1	0	1	0
18	MF	(England) ENG	Taylor Richards	5	0	0+4	0	1	0	0	0
19	MF	(England) ENG	Elijah Dixon-Bonner	25	0	9+14	0	1	0	1	0
20	DF	(United States) USA	Reggie Cannon	20	0	15+5	0	0	0	0	0
21	DF	(France) FRA	Ziyad Larkeche	22	0	3+17	0	1	0	1	0
22	DF	(Suriname) SUR	Kenneth Paal	46	4	44	4	0+1	0	0+1	0
23	FW	(United States) USA	Charlie Kelman	11	0	3+8	0	0	0	0	0
24	MF	(Guyana) GUY	Stephen Duke-McKenna	6	0	1+4	0	1	0	0	0
25	MF	(Denmark) DEN	Lucas Andersen	15	1	11+4	1	0	0	0	0
28	DF	(England) ENG	Joe Gubbins	2	0	1	0	1	0	0	0
29	DF	(England) ENG	Aaron Drewe	4	0	0+2	0	0+1	0	1	0
30	FW	(Republic of Ireland) IRL	Sinclair Armstrong	39	4	19+19	3	0	0	1	1
32	GK	(England) ENG	Joe Walsh	2	0	1	0	0+1	0	0	0
34	MF	(England) ENG	Rafferty Pedder	2	0	0+1	0	0	0	0+1	0
36	MF	(Iraq) IRQ	Alexander Aoraha	1	0	0	0	0+1	0	0	0
37	MF	(Ghana) GHA	Albert Adomah	18	0	2+14	0	1	0	0+1	0
38	MF	(Algeria) ALG	Rayan Kolli	11	0	0+10	0	0+1	0	0	0
41	MF	(Kosovo) KOS	Lorent Talla	1	0	0	0	0	0	0+1	0

=== Goals ===
As of 4 May 2024

Rank	Player	Position	Championship	FA Cup	EFL Cup	Total
1	(Morocco) Ilias Chair	MF	7	0	0	7
1	(Scotland) Lyndon Dykes	FW	6	1	0	7
3	(Suriname) Kenneth Paal	DF	4	0	0	4
3	(England) Chris Willock	MF	4	0	0	4
3	(Republic of Ireland) Sinclair Armstrong	FW	3	1	0	4
3	(England) Sam Field	MF	4	0	0	4
7	(England) Jack Colback	MF	3	0	0	3
7	(Northern Ireland) Paul Smyth	FW	3	0	0	3
9	(England) Andre Dozzell	MF	2	0	0	2
9	(England) Steve Cook	DF	2	0	0	2
11	(England) Jake Clarke-Salter	DF	1	0	0	1
11	(Republic of Ireland) Joe Hodge	MF	1	0	0	1
11	(Denmark) Lucas Andersen	MF	1	0	0	1
11	(Switzerland) Michael Frey	FW	1	0	0	1
11	(Republic of Ireland) Jimmy Dunne	DF	1	0	0	1
11	(Wales) Morgan Fox	DF	1	0	0	1
Own goal			3	0	0	3
Total			47	2	0	49

=== Clean sheets ===
As of 4 May 2024

Rank	Player	Position	Championship	FA Cup	EFL Cup	Total
1	(Bosnia and Herzegovina) Asmir Begovic	GK	13	0	0	13
2	(Wales) Joe Walsh	GK	0	0	0	0
Total			13	0	0	13
