= Jake Clarke-Salter =

English footballer (born 1997)

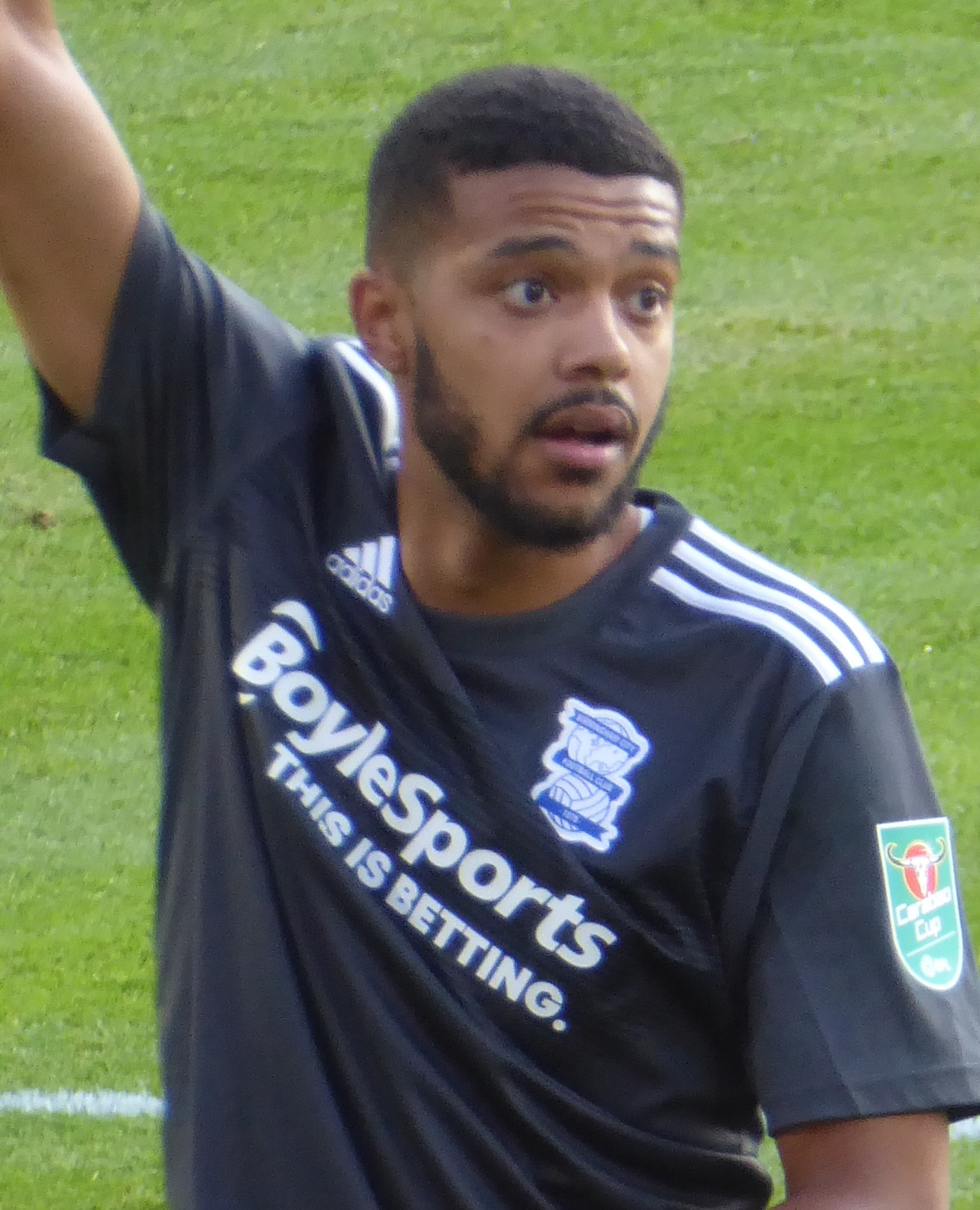
- Clarke-Salter with Birmingham City in 2019

Personal information
- Full name: Jake-Liam Clarke-Salter
- Date of birth: 22 September 1997 (age 29)
- Place of birth: Carshalton, England
- Height: 6 ft 2 in (1.88 m)
- Position: Defender

Team information
- Current team: Queens Park Rangers
- Number: 6

Youth career
- 2006–2007: Chelsea
- 2007–2008: Sutton United
- 2008–2016: Chelsea

Senior career*
Years	Team	Apps	(Gls)
2016–2022	Chelsea	1	(0)
2016–2017	→ Bristol Rovers (loan)	12	(1)
2018	→ Sunderland (loan)	11	(0)
2018–2019	→ Vitesse (loan)	29	(1)
2019–2020	→ Birmingham City (loan)	19	(1)
2020–2021	→ Birmingham City (loan)	10	(0)
2021–2022	→ Coventry City (loan)	29	(0)
2022–	Queens Park Rangers	60	(1)

International career
2014–2015	England U18	6	(0)
2015	England U19	5	(0)
2016–2017	England U20	10	(0)
2018–2019	England U21	12	(1)
Medal record
Men's Football
Representing England
FIFA U-20 World Cup
Winner	2017 Korea
- * Club domestic league appearances and goals as of 11:39, 12 January 2025 (UTC)

Jake-Liam Clarke-Salter (born 22 September 1997) is an English professional footballer who plays as a defender for EFL Championship club Queens Park Rangers. Whilst at Chelsea, he spent time on loan at Coventry City, Bristol Rovers, Sunderland, Vitesse and had two spells with Birmingham City. Internationally, he has represented England up to under-21 level.

== Club career ==
=== Chelsea ===
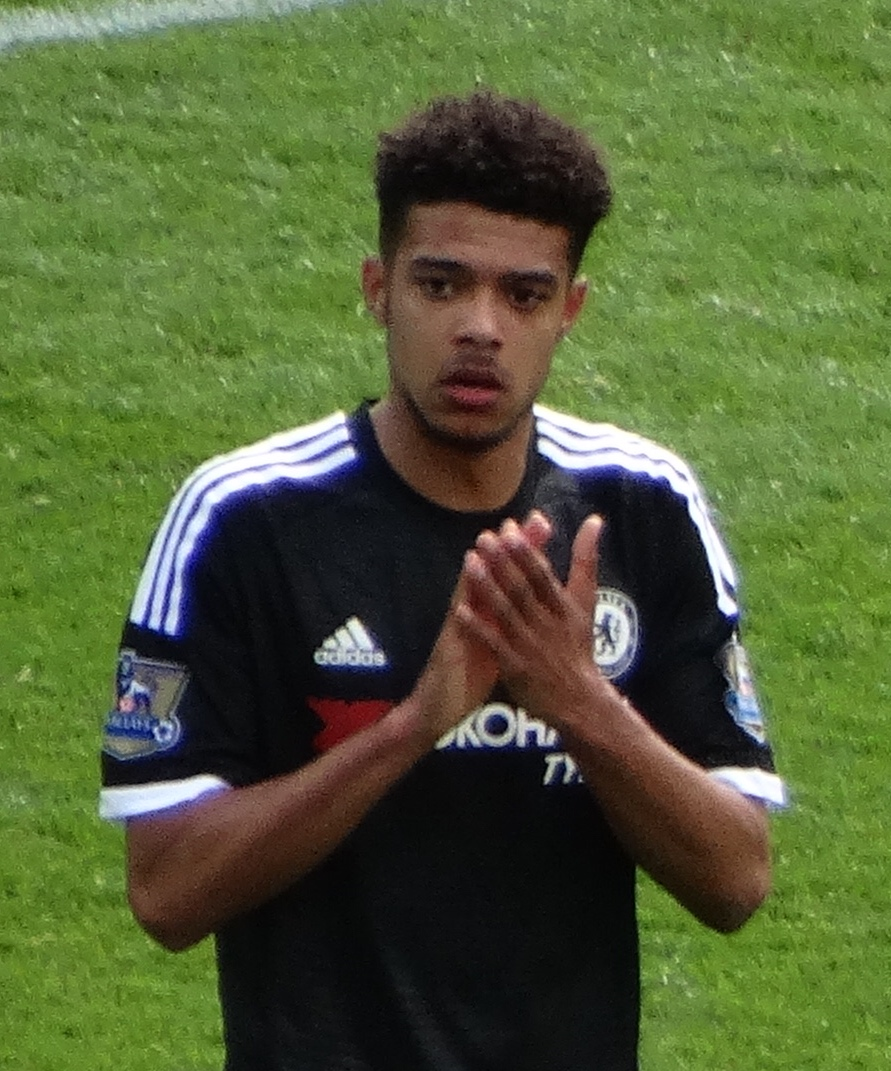
Clarke-Salter with Chelsea in 2016

Clarke-Salter first joined Chelsea in 2006 and spent the rest of his youth career there bar one season at Sutton United. He made his under-18 breakthrough at Chelsea in December 2013 whilst still sixteen years old. He became a key figure and the under-18 captain in Chelsea's youth surge after winning the FA Youth Cup twice and the UEFA Youth League. Clarke-Salter was included in Chelsea's pre-season tour of the US in 2015. However, he failed to make a single appearance in Chelsea's disappointing campaign.

On 5 March 2016, Clarke-Salter appeared on Chelsea's substitutes' bench in a 1–1 draw with Stoke City. On 2 April, he made his professional debut in Chelsea's 4–0 victory at Aston Villa, replacing Pedro in the 74th minute. After the match John Terry praised his performance and attitude, and hoped that Clarke-Salter went on to replace him one day.

==== 2016–17 season: Loan to Bristol Rovers ====
On 31 August 2016, Clarke-Salter and teammate Charlie Colkett joined League One club Bristol Rovers on a season-long loan. Unlike Colkett, Clarke-Salter did not join up with Rovers immediately, but remained at Chelsea while recovering from an injury sustained on international duty.

Clarke-Salter made his debut on 28 September 2016, starting in a 1–0 defeat away to Sheffield United. On his second appearance, on 18 October, he cut the ball back to provide the assist for the second goal of Matt Taylor's hat-trick as Rovers came back from 3–1 down to draw 3–3 with Milton Keynes Dons. Four days later he scored his first goal for Rovers with an 87th-minute header to complete a 2–0 win over Oldham Athletic. Clarke-Salter dislocated his elbow and broke a bone in his forearm during the 5–1 loss to Charlton Athletic in November and was out for nearly four months. He made his return as an 89th-minute substitute against Southend United in March 2017, but did not start a match until 11 April, in a 1–0 victory over AFC Wimbledon, and finished the season with just 13 appearances.

==== 2017–18 season: Return to Chelsea and loan to Sunderland ====
Following a loan spell at Notts county, Clarke-Salter returned to Chelsea and signed a new four-year deal in July 2017. He was given the number 35 jersey and made his first appearance of the 2017–18 season during Chelsea's 5–1 EFL Cup victory over Nottingham Forest.

On 8 January 2018, Clarke-Salter joined Championship club Sunderland on loan for the remainder of the campaign. Just under a week later, he made his debut during Sunderland's 4–0 away defeat against Cardiff City, playing the full 90 minutes. On 24 February 2018, Clarke-Salter was shown a red card for what BBC Sport's reporter saw as a "nasty late challenge" on Middlesbrough's Adama Traoré in a match that ended as a 3–3 draw. In his first game back from suspension, Clarke-Salter was dismissed again after receiving a second yellow card in a 2–0 defeat against Preston North End. He finished the loan spell with nine appearances.

==== 2018–19 season: Loan to Vitesse ====
On 2 July 2018, Clarke-Salter agreed to join Dutch side Vitesse on a season-long loan.

==== 2019–20 season: Loan to Birmingham City ====
Clarke-Salter signed for Championship club Birmingham City on 24 July 2019 on loan for the season. He made his debut on 6 August in the EFL Cup first round visit to Portsmouth. Manager Pep Clotet fielded an inexperienced team, and Clarke-Salter played the whole of the 3–0 defeat. He did not play in the Championship until 1 October, taking the place of the injured Marc Roberts in the starting eleven for the 1–0 defeat away to Wigan Athletic. According to the manager, "he played with a lot of maturity, he was very focused, he dealt very well with the physicality of the game and worked very well with Harlee [Dean] as well. He also covered the line very well. I think on the ball he was very good as well so it was a very positive game for him." His performance was similarly positive in his next appearance a month later, when he replaced the suspended Dean for a 1–0 defeat at home to Fulham. He scored his first goal for Birmingham in a 1–1 draw with Millwall on 30 November.

==== 2020–21 season: Loan return to Birmingham City ====
On 16 October 2020, Clarke-Salter returned to Birmingham City on loan for the remainder of the season. A calf injury kept him out until after the international break, and he made his debut on 24 November away to Luton Town as one of three centre-backs alongside Dean and Roberts. He was a regular in the matchday squad for the next three months, made nine starts, mainly as cover for injured or suspended players, and one substitute appearance. Apart from one poor game away to Cardiff City, he performed adequately, showing technical competence that his fellow defenders did not, but the Birmingham Mail suggested that overall he had wasted his season by spending it on Birmingham's bench.

==== 2021-22 season: Loan to Coventry City ====
On 13 August 2021, Clarke-Salter joined Championship club Coventry City on a loan deal until the end of the season. Clarke-Salter was a mainstay in the Coventry team in a largely successful loan spell, making 29 appearances for the Sky Blues, with injury hampering him from making more. On 10 June 2022, Chelsea announced he was leaving the club.

=== Queens Park Rangers ===
On 17 June 2022, Clarke-Salter joined Championship club Queens Park Rangers on a four-year deal.

On 18th September 2025 He was named as the 1163rd player to play for Queens Park Rangers with his debut on 30/07/2022

== International career ==
Clarke-Salter was born in England, and is of Irish descent through a grandmother, and is eligible to represent both countries internationally. He was selected for the England U20 in the 2017 FIFA U-20 World Cup. He played in four of the seven games, but in the final he conceded a controversial penalty that was saved by goalkeeper Freddie Woodman. England beat Venezuela 1–0, the first time an England team had won a global tournament since the 1966 World Cup.

Clarke-Salter made his England U21 debut on 24 March 2018 in a 2019 European Championship qualifier at home to Romania U21; he scored England's second goal in a 2–1 victory.

Clarke-Salter was named as captain of the England Under-21 side ahead of the European Championship finals.

== Career statistics ==
As of match played 11 January 2025

Club	Season	League			National cup		League cup		Europe		Other		Total	
Club	Season	Division	Apps	Goals	Apps	Goals	Apps	Goals	Apps	Goals	Apps	Goals	Apps	Goals
Chelsea	2015–16	Premier League	1	0	0	0	0	0	0	0	0	0	1	0
Chelsea	2016–17	Premier League	0	0	0	0	0	0	0	0	0	0	0	0
Chelsea	2017–18	Premier League	0	0	0	0	1	0	0	0	0	0	1	0
Chelsea	2018–19	Premier League	0	0	0	0	0	0	0	0	0	0	0	0
Chelsea	2019–20	Premier League	0	0	0	0	0	0	0	0	0	0	0	0
Chelsea	2020–21	Premier League	0	0	0	0	0	0	0	0	0	0	0	0
Chelsea	2021–22	Premier League	0	0	0	0	0	0	0	0	0	0	0	0
Chelsea	Total		1	0	0	0	1	0	0	0	0	0	2	0
Bristol Rovers (loan)	2016–17	League One	12	1	1	0	0	0	—		0	0	13	1
Sunderland (loan)	2017–18	Championship	11	0	—		—		—		—		11	0
Vitesse (loan)	2018–19	Eredivisie	29	1	4	0	—		4 (Note: Appearances in UEFA Europa League)	0	—		37	1
Birmingham City (loan)	2019–20	Championship	19	1	3	0	1	0	—		—		23	1
Birmingham City (loan)	2020–21	Championship	10	0	1	0	—		—		—		11	0
Birmingham City (loan)	Total		29	1	4	0	1	0	—		—		34	1
Coventry City (loan)	2021–22	Championship	29	0	2	0	0	0	—		—		31	0
Queens Park Rangers	2022–23	Championship	16	0	0	0	0	0	—		—		16	0
Queens Park Rangers	2023–24	Championship	33	1	0	0	0	0	—		—		33	1
Queens Park Rangers	2024–25	Championship	11	0	1	0	2	0	—		—		14	0
Queens Park Rangers	Total		60	1	1	0	2	0	—		—		63	1
Career total			169	4	12	0	4	0	4	0	0	0	189	4

== Honours ==
Chelsea Reserves

- FA Youth Cup: 2013–14, 2014–15, 2015–16
- UEFA Youth League: 2014–15, 2015–16

England U20

- FIFA U-20 World Cup: 2017

England U21

- Toulon Tournament: 2018

Individual

- Queens Park Rangers Players' Player of the Year: 2023–24
