= Hiran Ahmed =

Iraqi footballer

Personal information
- Date of birth: 6 April 2000 (age 26)
- Place of birth: Bochum, Germany
- Height: 1.76 m (5 ft 9 in)
- Position: Midfielder

Team information
- Current team: Al-Quwa Al-Jawiya

Youth career
- –2017: VfL Bochum
- 2017–2018: Wattenscheid 09
- 2018–2019: Hombrucher SV
- 2019: Thun

Senior career*
Years	Team	Apps	(Gls)
2020–2023	Thun	41	(4)
2023–24	Duhok	0	(0)
2024-	Al-Quwa Al-Jawiya	12	(2)

International career^{‡}
2021	Iraq U23	2	(0)
2022–	Iraq	2	(0)
- * Club domestic league appearances and goals as of 23 May 2024 @ 17:52(AEST) ‡ National team caps and goals as of 19 June 2023

Hiran Ahmed (born 6 April 2000) is a professional footballer who plays as a midfielder. Born in Germany, he plays for the Iraq national team.

== International career ==
Also eligible to represent Germany, Hiran was invited to the Iraqi Olympic team camp in January 2022, and was one of five Iraqi players based abroad that were later selected for the 2022 Dubai Cup in March. He made his debut against Vietnam and went on to play against Saudi Arabia and Thailand too.

He played in both warm-up matches against Iran before being selected for the 2022 AFC U-23 Asian Cup in Uzbekistan. He assisted Hasan Abdulkareem's goal against Australia and helped Iraq reach the quarter-finals before being knocked out of the tournament on penalties by the hosts

On 5 September 2022, Hiran was selected for the first team for the 2022 Jordan International Tournament. On 23 September 2022, he made his first team debut for Iraq in a penalty shootout loss against Oman.
