= Murad Mohammed =

Iraqi footballer

Personal information
- Date of birth: 1 April 1997 (age 29)
- Place of birth: Iraq
- Height: 5 ft 7 in (1.71 m)
- Position: Forward

Team information
- Current team: Al-Quwa Al-Jawiya
- Number: 11

Senior career*
Years	Team	Apps	(Gls)
- Al-Shirqat
–2017	Baiji		
2017–2020	Al-Kahrabaa		
2020–2021	Al Shorta	26	(2)
2021–2022	Naft Al-Wasat		
2022–2026	Al-Zawraa		
2026–	Al-Quwa Al-Jawiya	4	(0)

International career^{‡}
2017-2018	Iraq U20		
2018-	Iraq U23	6	(3)
2021–	Iraq	1	(0)
- * Club domestic league appearances and goals ‡ National team caps and goals as of 19 January 2021

Murad Mohammed Sabah (Arabic: مراد محمد صباح; born 1 April 1997) is an Iraqi professional footballer who plays as a forward for Al-Quwa Al-Jawiya in the Iraqi Premier League and the Iraqi national team.

== Club career ==
=== Al-Kahrabaa ===
Mohammed signed for Iraqi Premier League side Al-Kahrabaa in 2017, helping them to fifth place in his debut season, their best ever finish in their history. The following season, Murad helped the club to their first ever Iraq FA Cup final, beating Al-Talaba 3-0 in the semi-final before losing to Al-Zawraa 1-0 in the final.

=== Al-Shorta ===
In June 2020, Mohammed signed for Iraqi Premier League defending champions Al-Shorta. Murad scored his first goals for his new club in November 2020 in the Iraq FA Cup against Al-Khalis, scoring two goals in a 5-0 victory.

== International career ==
=== Iraq U-20 ===
Mohammed was first called up by his country at Under-20 level.

=== Iraq U-23 ===
Murad was part of the Iraq U-23 side that qualified for the 2020 AFC U-23 Championship in Australia. Murad scored 3 goals in 3 appearances in the qualifiers and started all 3 matches in the tournament as Iraq were knocked out at the group stage.

=== Iraq ===
On 27 January 2021, Murad Mohammed made his first international cap with Iraq against Kuwait in a friendly.
