= 2025–26 Birmingham City F.C. season =

English football club season

Birmingham City
2025–26 season
- Owners: Birmingham Sports Holdings 51.7%; Shelby Companies 45.96%; Others 2.34% (until 7 November 2025); Shelby Companies Ltd 96.64%; Others 3.36%; thereafter
- Chairman: Tom Wagner
- Manager: Chris Davies
- Stadium: St Andrew's
- Championship: 10th
- FA Cup: Fourth round
- EFL Cup: Second round
- Top goalscorer: League: Marvin Ducksch; Jay Stansfield (10 each); All: Marvin Ducksch; Jay Stansfield (11 each)
- Average home league attendance: 27,163
Home colours	Away colours

The 2025–26 season was Birmingham City Football Club's 123rd season in the English football league system and first season back in the second-tier, the Championship, since the 2023–24 season. As with all second-tier League clubs, the first team also competed in the FA Cup and EFL Cup.

== Pre-season ==
On 23 May, Birmingham City announced their first three pre-season friendlies, against Solihull Moors, Northampton Town and Port Vale. Three weeks later, a fourth fixture was confirmed to be against Burton Albion. A fifth and sixth, was later added against Sevilla during a training camp in Albufeira and Crewe Alexandra; respectively.

Also announced was a fixture versus Nottingham Forest in a memorial game for Trevor Francis.

Pre-season friendly match details
Date	Time	Opponents	Venue	Result	Score F–A	Scorers	Ref.
12 July 2025	20:00	Sevilla	N	W	3–1	Anderson 10', Klarer 26', Leonard 88'	
19 July 2025	15:00	Burton Albion	A	L	0–1	—	
19 July 2025	15:00	Crewe Alexandra	A	L	0–4	—	
23 July 2025	19:30	Solihull Moors	H	W	1–0	Sampsted 45+1'	
26 July 2025	13:00	Port Vale	A	W	2–0	Anderson 26', Willumsson 80'	
26 July 2025	15:00	Northampton Town	A	L	0–3	—	
2 August 2025	15:00	Nottingham Forest	H	W	1–0	Stansfield 23'	

== EFL Championship ==
=== League table ===
Pos	Team	Pld	W	D	L	GF	GA	GD	Pts
8	Derby County	46	20	9	17	67	59	+8	69
9	Norwich City	46	19	8	19	63	56	+7	65
10	Birmingham City	46	17	13	16	57	56	+1	64
11	Swansea City	46	18	10	18	57	59	−2	64
12	Bristol City	46	17	11	18	59	59	0	62

Source: EFL Official Website
Rules for classification: 1) Points; 2) Goal difference; 3) Number of goals scored; 4) Head-to-head results; 5) Wins; 6) Away goals; 7) Penalty points (sec 9.5); 8) Number of 12-point sending off offences; 9) Play-off (only if needed to determine promotion/relegation)

=== Results summary ===
Overall								Home						Away					
Pld	W	D	L	GF	GA	GD	Pts	W	D	L	GF	GA	GD	W	D	L	GF	GA	GD
46	17	13	16	57	56	+1	64	12	8	3	39	22	+17	5	5	13	18	34	−16

Last updated: complete.

=== Match results ===
On 26 June, the EFL Championship fixtures were announced.

Championship match details
Date	League position	Time	Opponents	Venue	Result	Score F–A	Scorers	Attendance	Refs
8 August 2025	9th	20:00	Ipswich Town	H	D	1–1	Stansfield 55'	27,508	
16 August 2025	6th	15:00	Blackburn Rovers	A	W	2–1	Stansfield 90' (pen.), Dykes 90+8'	19,552	
23 August 2025	5th	15:00	Oxford United	H	W	1–0	Paik 40'	27,342	
29 August 2025	10th	20:00	Leicester City	A	L	0–2	—	30,971	
13 September 2025	11th	15:00	Stoke City	A	L	0–1	—	24,676	
20 September 2025	8th	12:30	Swansea City	H	W	1–0	Dykes 90+4'	27,441	
27 September 2025	11th	12:30	Coventry City	A	L	0–3	—	30,585	
30 September 2025	11th	19:45	Sheffield Wednesday	H	D	2–2	Stansfield 9', Gray 90+9'	27,323	
3 October 2025	16th	20:00	Wrexham	A	D	1–1	Roberts 46'	10,669	
18 October 2025	17th	15:00	Hull City	H	L	2–3	Stansfield 27', 90+6' (pen.)	27,215	
21 October 2025	13th	19:45	Preston North End	A	W	1–0	Neumann 33'	16,857	
25 October 2025	15th	15:00	Bristol City	A	L	0–1	—	24,923	
1 November 2025	11th	15:00	Portsmouth	H	W	4–0	Paik Seung-ho 9', Iwata 56', Klarer 61', Anderson 88'	27,903	
4 November 2025	9th	19:45	Millwall	H	W	4–0	Paik Seung-ho 28', Gray 45', Cochrane 49', Stansfield 66'	25,408	
8 November 2025	11th	15:00	Middlesbrough	A	L	1–2	Gray 29'	26,378	
22 November 2025	9th	15:00	Norwich City	H	W	4–1	Ducksch (2) 3', 44', Stansfield (2) 21', 54'	28,080	
26 November 2025	9th	20:00	West Bromwich Albion	A	D	1–1	Ducksch 78'	24,282	
1 December 2025	8th	20:00	Watford	H	W	2–1	Paik Seung-ho 31', Gray 43'	26,086	
6 December 2025	8th	15:00	Southampton	A	L	1–3	Gray 54'	29,309	
9 December 2025	11th	20:00	Queens Park Rangers	A	L	1–2	Roberts 90+3'	14,947	
13 December 2025	12th	15:00	Charlton Athletic	H	D	1–1	Klarer 28'	26,822	
20 December 2025	14th	15:00	Sheffield United	A	L	0–3	—	28,271	
26 December 2025	15th	12:30	Derby County	H	D	1–1	Robinson 64'	28,082	
29 December 2025	15th	20:15	Southampton	H	D	1–1	Neumann 49'	27,895	
1 January 2026	17th	15:00	Watford	A	L	0–3	—	20,816	
4 January 2026	13th	12:00	Coventry City	H	W	3–2	Ducksch (2) 6', 63', Koumas 17'	27,932	
17 January 2026	14th	17:30	Swansea City	A	D	1–1	Roberts 72'	16,753	
20 January 2026	13th	19:45	Sheffield Wednesday	A	W	2–0	Ducksch 83', Furuhashi 90+2'	22,396	
24 January 2026	13th	15:00	Stoke City	H	D	1–1	Iwata 42'	27,904	
31 January 2026	13th	15:00	Oxford United	A	W	2–0	Peart-Harris 23' (o.g.), Ducksch 66'	11,509	
7 February 2026	10th	15:01	Leicester City	H	W	2–1	Osman 3', Stansfield 67'	27,886	
10 February 2026	10th	20:00	West Bromwich Albion	H	D	0–0	—	27,307	
21 February 2026	8th	15:00	Norwich City	A	W	2–1	Vicente 5', Ducksch 14'	26,537	
25 February 2026	10th	19:45	Millwall	A	L	0–3	—	16,636	
2 March 2026	12th	20:00	Middlesbrough	H	L	1–3	Ducksch 48'	26,918	
7 March 2026	12th	15:00	Charlton Athletic	A	L	0–1	—	18,541	
11 March 2026	10th	19:45	Queens Park Rangers	H	W	1–0	Roberts 6'	25,212	
14 March 2026	9th	15:00	Sheffield United	H	D	1–1	Ducksch 25'	27,588	
21 March 2026	11th	12:30	Derby County	A	L	0–1	—	29,928	
3 April 2026	14th	15:00	Blackburn Rovers	H	L	0–1	—	27,842	
6 April 2026	16th	15:00	Ipswich Town	A	L	1–2	Vicente 32'	29,381	
12 April 2026	15th	12:00	Wrexham	H	W	2–0	Vicente 48', Klarer 71'	28,054	
18 April 2026	14th	15:00	Hull City	A	D	1–1	Iwata 77'	22,706	
21 April 2026	10th	19:45	Preston North End	H	W	2–1	Stansfield 10', Osman 16'	23,798	
25 April 2026	10th	15:00	Bristol City	H	W	2–1	Neumann 8', Solís 29'	27,210	
2 May 2026	10th	12:30	Portsmouth	A	D	1–1	Priske 19'	20,478	

== FA Cup ==
FA Cup match details
Round	Date	Opponents	Venue	Result	Score F–A	Scorers	Attendance	Refs
Third Round	10 January 2026	Cambridge United	A	W	3–2	Wagner 31', Furuhashi 42' (pen.), Ducksch 78'	6,241	
Fourth Round	15 February 2026	Leeds United	H	D	1–1 (a.e.t.) (2–4 p)	Roberts 89'	28,035	

== EFL Cup ==
EFL Cup match details
Round	Date	Opponents	Venue	Result	Score F–A	Scorers	Attendance	Refs
First round	13 August 2025	Sheffield United	H	W	2–1	Furuhashi 5', Stansfield 87'	16,367	
Second round	26 August 2025	Port Vale	H	L	0–1	—	21,052	

== Transfers ==
For those players sold, released, or whose contract ended before the start of this season, see 2024–25 Birmingham City F.C. season.

=== In ===
Date	Player	Club †	Fee	Refs
3 July 2025	(Jamaica) Demarai Gray	(Saudi Arabia) Al-Ettifaq	Undisclosed	
4 July 2025	(Nigeria) Bright Osayi-Samuel	(Turkey) Fenerbahçe	Free	
5 July 2025	(Japan) Kyōgo Furuhashi	(France) Rennes	Undisclosed	
6 July 2025	(Japan) Kanya Fujimoto	(Portugal) Gil Vicente	Free	
7 August 2025	(Germany) Marvin Ducksch	(Germany) Werder Bremen	£1,750,000	
1 September 2025	(England) Jack Robinson	(England) Sheffield United	Undisclosed	
2 January 2026	(Germany) Kai Wagner	(United States) Philadelphia Union	Undisclosed	
20 January 2026	(Denmark) August Priske	(Sweden) Djurgårdens	£6,000,000	
27 January 2026	(Spain) Carlos Vicente	(Spain) Deportivo Alavés	£6,940,000	
2 February 2026	(England) Jonathan Panzo	(Portugal) Rio Ave	Undisclosed	
2 February 2026	(England) Patrick Roberts	(England) Sunderland	Undisclosed	

=== Loaned in ===
Date	Player	Club	Return	Refs
1 July 2025	(England) James Beadle	(England) Brighton & Hove Albion	31 May 2026	
2 July 2025	(England) Tommy Doyle	(England) Wolverhampton Wanderers	31 May 2026	
25 July 2025	(Republic of Ireland) Eíran Cashin	(England) Brighton & Hove Albion	6 January 2026 (Note: On 6 January, Cashin was recalled back from his season-long loan from Brighton)	
22 August 2025	(Wales) Lewis Koumas	(England) Liverpool	26 January 2026 (Note: On 26 January, Koumas was recalled back to Liverpool from his initial season-long loan)	
1 September 2025	(England) Patrick Roberts	(England) Sunderland	2 February 2026 (Note: On 2 February, Roberts signed for the club permanently)	
17 January 2026	(Colombia) Jhon Solís	(Spain) Girona	31 May 2026	
19 January 2026	(Ghana) Ibrahim Osman	(England) Brighton & Hove Albion	31 May 2026	

=== Loaned out ===
Date	Player	Club	Return	Refs
18 July 2025	(Northern Ireland) Bailey Peacock-Farrell	(England) Blackpool	30 January 2026 (Note: On 30 January, Peacock-Farrell joined Blackpool on a permanent basis)	
24 July 2025	(England) Byron Pendleton	(England) Yeovil Town	9 November 2025 (Note: On 9 November, Pendleton was recalled back from his season-long loan at Yeovil)	
1 August 2025	(Sweden) Emil Hansson	(England) Blackpool	31 May 2026	
4 August 2025	(England) Ben Wodskou	(England) Yeovil Town	21 October 2025 (Note: On 21 October, Wodskou was recalled back from his loan at Yeovil)	
5 August 2025	(England) Dion Sanderson	(England) Derby County	31 December 2025 (Note: On 31 December, it was announced that Sanderson would sign for Derby on a permanent basis)	
8 August 2025	(England) Tyrese Warmington	(England) Redditch United		
19 August 2025	(Northern Ireland) Tommy Fogarty	(England) Boston United	23 January 2026 (Note: On 23 January, Fogarty was recalled back from his season-long loan at Boston United and subsequently joined Morecambe on loan)	
1 September 2025	(England) Alfie Chang	(England) Bristol Rovers	6 January 2026 (Note: On 6 January, Chang's season-long loan at Bristol Rovers was terminated)	
1 September 2025	(England) Taylor Gardner-Hickman	(England) Blackburn Rovers	31 May 2026	
1 September 2025	(Wales) Tyler Roberts	(England) Mansfield Town	2 February 2026 (Note: On 2 February, Roberts joined Mansfield Town on a permanent basis)	
7 October 2025	(England) Frank Tattum	(England) Alvechurch	1 January 2026	
24 October 2025	(England) Cody Pennington	(England) Redditch United	23 November 2025	
5 December 2025	(England) Byron Pendleton	(England) Brackley Town	9 April 2026 (Note: On 7 January, Pendleton's and Wodskou loan at Brackley Town was extended until the end of the season. However on 9 April, Pendleton's loan was terminated due to sustaining an injury)	
5 December 2025	(England) Ben Wodskou	(England) Brackley Town	31 May 2026	
20 December 2025	(England) O'Shea Ellis	(England) Oxford City	31 May 2026 (Note: On 3 February, Ellis' loan at Oxford City was extended until the end of the season)	
23 December 2025	(Wales) Zach Willis	(England) Peterborough Sports	31 May 2026 (Note: On 3 February, Willis' loan at Peterborough Sports until the end of the season)	
5 January 2026	(England) George Wynne	(England) Bromsgrove Sporting	30 April 2026	
23 January 2026	(Northern Ireland) Tommy Fogarty	(England) Morecambe	31 May 2026	
23 January 2026	(Scotland) Marc Leonard	(Scotland) Heart of Midlothian	31 May 2026	
2 February 2026	(Zimbabwe) Menzi Mazwi	(Scotland) Queen of the South	31 May 2026	
2 February 2026	(Scotland) Scott Wright	(Scotland) Dundee	31 May 2026	
6 February 2026	(Republic of Ireland) Daniel Isichei	(England) Tamworth	31 May 2026	
20 February 2026	(Belgium) Godfred Boakye	(Azerbaijan) Sabah	31 May 2026	
27 March 2026	(England) William O'Sullivan	(England) Solihull Moors	31 May 2026	

=== Out ===
Date	Player	Club †	Fee	Refs
24 June 2025	(England) Brandon Khela	(England) Peterborough United	Undisclosed	
25 June 2025	(Japan) Ayumu Yokoyama	(Belgium) Genk	Undisclosed	
10 July 2025	(England) Emmanuel Longelo	(Scotland) Motherwell	Undisclosed	
22 July 2025	(England) Alfie May	(England) Huddersfield Town	£1,200,000	
14 August 2025	(Poland) Krystian Bielik	(England) West Bromwich Albion	£1,000,000	
1 September 2025	(England) George Hall	(England) Port Vale	Undisclosed	
1 January 2026 (Note: The transfer was announced on 31 December, and would become official on January 1 once the transfer window opens)	(England) Dion Sanderson	(England) Derby County	Undisclosed	
5 January 2026	(Sweden) Emil Hansson	(Netherlands) Excelsior	Free Transfer	
14 January 2026	(England) Keshi Anderson	(England) Portsmouth	Free	
15 January 2026	(Scotland) Lyndon Dykes	(England) Charlton Athletic	Undisclosed	
24 January 2026	(Iceland) Alfons Sampsted	(Netherlands) Go Ahead Eagles	Undisclosed	
30 January 2026	(England) Alfie Chang	(England) Walsall	Free	
30 January 2026	(Northern Ireland) Bailey Peacock-Farrell	(England) Blackpool	Undisclosed	
1 February 2026	(Iceland) Willum Þór Willumsson	(Netherlands) NEC Nijmegen	Undisclosed	
2 February 2026	(Wales) Tyler Roberts	(England) Mansfield Town	Free Transfer	

== Appearances, goals and discipline ==
Numbers in parentheses denote appearances made as a substitute.
Players marked † left the club during the playing season.
Players with names in italics and marked * were on loan from another club for the whole of their season with Birmingham.
Players listed with no appearances have been in the matchday squad but only as unused substitutes.
Key to positions: GK – Goalkeeper; DF – Defender; MF – Midfielder; FW – Forward

Players' appearances, goals and discipline by competition
No.	Pos.	Nat.	Name	League		FA Cup		EFL Cup		Total		Discipline	
No.	Pos.	Nat.	Name	Apps	Goals	Apps	Goals	Apps	Goals	Apps	Goals	A yellow rectangle, denoting the yellow penalty card shown to a player being cautioned	A red rectangle, denoting the red penalty card shown to a player being sent off
2	DF	(England)	Ethan Laird	9+11	0	0+0	0	1+1	0	10+12	0	2	0
4	DF	(Austria)	Christoph Klarer	43+0	3	2+0	0	1+0	0	46+0	3	11	1
5	DF	(Germany)	Phil Neumann	32+1	3	0+1	0	1+0	0	33+2	3	6	0
6	DF	(England)	Jack Robinson	14+1	1	1+0	0	0+0	0	15+1	1	4	2
7	MF	(England)	Tommy Doyle	19+19	0	2+0	0	2+0	0	23+19	0	2	1
8	MF	(South Korea)	Paik Seung-ho	38+5	4	1+0	0	0+2	0	39+7	4	6	0
9	FW	(Japan)	Kyōgo Furuhashi	8+20	1	1+0	1	1+1	1	10+21	3	1	0
10	FW	(Jamaica)	Demarai Gray	27+10	5	1+0	0	1+0	0	29+10	5	5	0
11	FW	(Scotland)	Scott Wright	0+3	0	0+0	0	0+0	0	0+3	0	0	0
12	MF	(Scotland)	Marc Leonard	5+10	0	0+0	0	2+0	0	7+10	0	2	0
14	MF	(Colombia)	Jhon Solís	13+4	1	1+0	0	0+0	0	14+4	1	4	1
16	FW	(England)	Patrick Roberts	27+8	4	1+1	1	0+0	0	28+9	5	3	0
17	FW	(Ghana)	Ibrahim Osman	13+5	2	0+0	0	0+0	0	13+5	2	2	0
19	DF	(England)	Taylor Gardner-Hickman	0+1	0	0+0	0	1+0	0	1+1	0	0	0
20	DF	(England)	Alex Cochrane	18+3	1	0+0	0	1+1	0	19+4	1	3	0
21	GK	(England)	Ryan Allsop	11+0	0	1+0	0	0+0	0	12+0	0	2	0
23	FW	(Spain)	Carlos Vicente	10+7	3	1+0	0	0+0	0	11+7	3	2	0
24	MF	(Japan)	Tomoki Iwata	42+3	3	1+0	0	1+0	0	44+3	3	8	0
25	GK	(England)	James Beadle	35+0	0	1+0	0	2+0	0	38+0	0	4	0
26	DF	(Nigeria)	Bright Osayi-Samuel	19+8	0	1+0	0	0+1	0	20+9	0	6	0
27	MF	(Japan)	Kanya Fujimoto	0+6	0	0+1	0	1+0	0	1+7	0	0	0
28	FW	(England)	Jay Stansfield	41+3	10	1+0	0	0+2	1	42+5	11	11	0
29	FW	(Denmark)	August Priske	9+8	1	1+0	0	0+0	0	10+8	1	1	0
31	DF	(Germany)	Kai Wagner	16+0	0	2+0	1	0+0	0	18+0	1	1	0
33	FW	(Germany)	Marvin Ducksch	25+9	10	1+0	1	1+0	0	27+9	11	2	0
37	DF	(England)	Jonathan Panzo	6+2	0	1+0	0	0+0	0	7+2	0	1	0
43	FW	(Algeria)	Zaid Betteka	0+0	0	0+1	0	0+0	0	0+1	0	0	0
Player(s) who featured but departed the club permanently during the season:
14	FW	(England)	Keshi Anderson	7+12	1	0+0	0	0+1	0	7+13	1	1	0
17	FW	(Scotland)	Lyndon Dykes	2+19	2	0+0	0	1+1	0	3+20	2	1	0
18	MF	(Iceland)	Willum Þór Willumsson	5+5	0	0+1	0	1+0	0	6+6	0	0	0
23	DF	(Iceland)	Alfons Sampsted	2+4	0	0+1	0	1+0	0	3+5	0	0	0
30	FW	(Wales)	Lewis Koumas	7+16	1	1+0	0	1+0	0	9+16	1	1	0
41	DF	(Republic of Ireland)	Eiran Cashin	3+8	0	0+0	0	2+0	0	5+8	0	0	0
