= Lee Myung-jae =

South Korean footballer

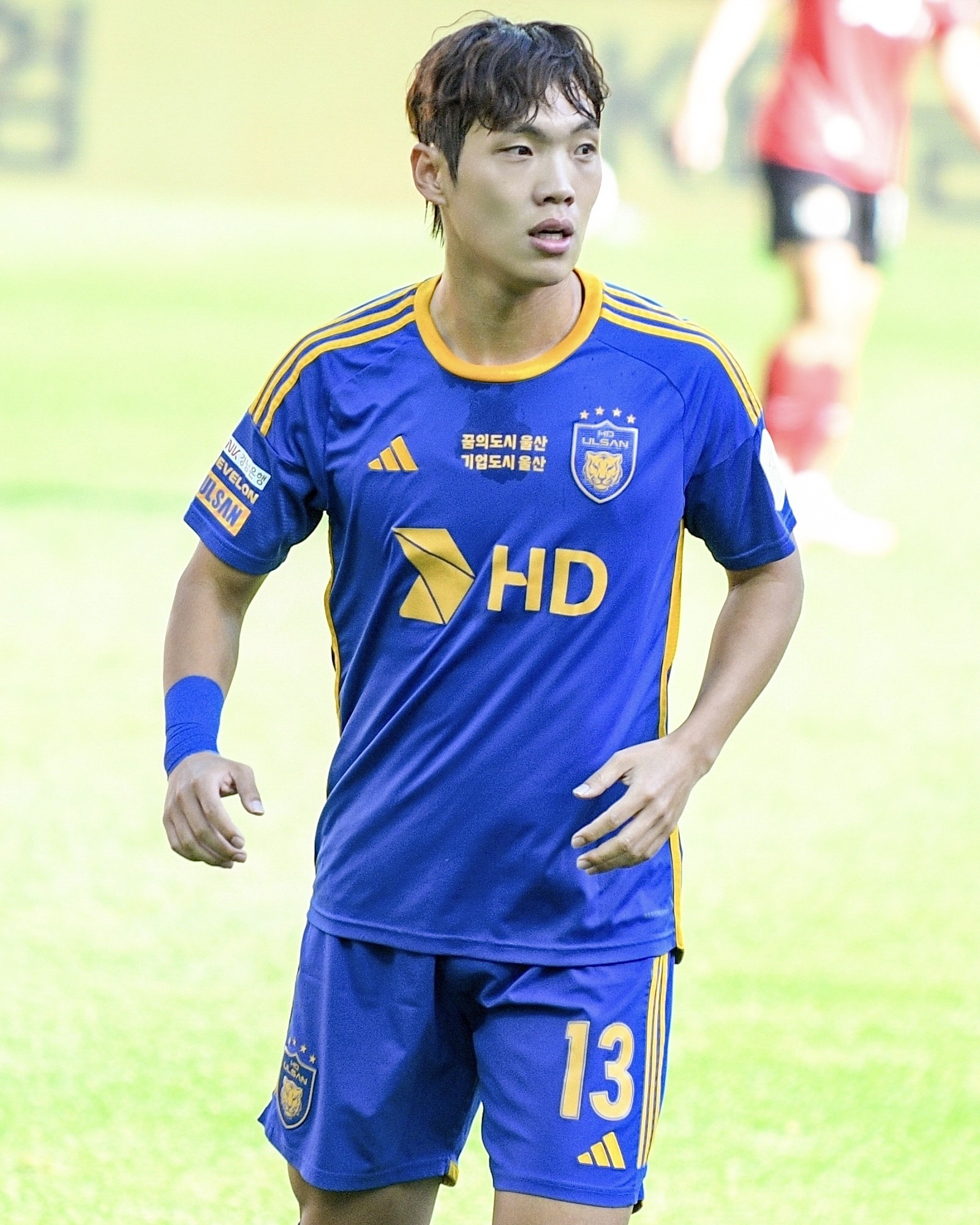
- Lee in 2024

Personal information
- Date of birth: 4 November 1993 (age 33)
- Place of birth: Seoul, South Korea
- Height: 1.81 m (5 ft 11 in)
- Position: Left back

Team information
- Current team: Daejeon Hana Citizen
- Number: 16

Youth career
- 2012–2013: Hongik University

Senior career*
Years	Team	Apps	(Gls)
2014–2025	Ulsan HD	193	(1)
2014	→ Albirex Niigata (loan)	5	(0)
2020–2021	→ Gimcheon Sangmu (draft)	8	(0)
2025	Birmingham City	3	(0)
2025–	Daejeon Hana Citizen	43	(4)

International career^{‡}
2012–2013	South Korea U20	5	(0)
2014–2015	South Korea U23	6	(0)
2024–	South Korea	12	(0)
- * Club domestic league appearances and goals as of 8 November 2026 ‡ National team caps and goals as of 17 November 2026

- Lee Myung-jae
- Hangul: 이명재
- Hanja: 李明載
- RR: I Myeongjae
- MR: I Myŏngjae

Lee Myung-jae (Korean: 이명재; Hanja: 李明載; born 4 November 1993) is a South Korean footballer who plays as a left-back for K League 1 club Daejeon Hana Citizen and the South Korea national team.

== Club career ==
=== Ulsan HD ===
Lee joined Ulsan Hyundai in 2014 and made his league debut against Incheon United on 23 March 2014. He was loaned to Albirex Niigata on 24 June 2014.

=== Birmingham City ===
On 3 February 2025, after 11 years at Ulsan HD, Lee signed on a free transfer for English EFL League One team Birmingham City until the end of the 2024-25 season, joining compatriot Paik Seung-ho at the club. He eventually made his debut on 18 April, replacing established left-back Alex Cochrane during the second half of a goalless draw at home to Crawley Town.

On 20 May 2025, the club announced he would be leaving in June when his contract expired.

== International career ==
Lee was a member of the South Korea national U-20 team for the 2014 Toulon Tournament.

Lee made his debut for the senior South Korea national team on 21 March 2024 in a 2026 FIFA World Cup qualifier against Thailand.

In the 2026 FIFA World Cup qualifier against Iraq on 15 October 2024, Lee Myung-jae completely deceived the opponent and assisted Lee Jae-seong's headed goal with an accurate cross.

== Career statistics ==
=== Club ===
As of match played 8 November 2026

Appearances and goals by club, season and competition
Club	Season	League			National cup (Note: Includes KFA Cup, Emperor's Cup, FA Cup)		League cup (Note: Includes J. League Cup)		Continental		Other		Total	
Club	Season	Division	Apps	Goals	Apps	Goals	Apps	Goals	Apps	Goals	Apps	Goals	Apps	Goals
Ulsan Hyundai/ Ulsan HD	2014	K League 1	2	0	1	0	—		1 (Note: Appearances in AFC Champions League Elite)	0	—		4	0
Ulsan Hyundai/ Ulsan HD	2015	K League 1	19	0	0	0	—		—		—		19	0
Ulsan Hyundai/ Ulsan HD	2016	K League 1	5	0	1	0	—		—		—		6	0
Ulsan Hyundai/ Ulsan HD	2017	K League 1	32	1	4	0	—		1	0	—		37	1
Ulsan Hyundai/ Ulsan HD	2018	K League 1	32	0	3	0	—		6	0	—		41	0
Ulsan Hyundai/ Ulsan HD	2019	K League 1	24	0	1	0	—		7	0	—		32	0
Ulsan Hyundai/ Ulsan HD	2021	K League 1	2	0	1	0	—		4	0	—		7	0
Ulsan Hyundai/ Ulsan HD	2022	K League 1	19	0	2	0	—		5	0	—		26	0
Ulsan Hyundai/ Ulsan HD	2023	K League 1	30	0	1	0	—		4	1	—		35	1
Ulsan Hyundai/ Ulsan HD	2024	K League 1	28	0	4	0	—		10	1	—		42	1
Ulsan Hyundai/ Ulsan HD	Total		193	1	18	0	—		38	2	—		249	3
Albirex Niigata (loan)	2014	J1 League	5	0	0	0	0	0	—		—		5	0
Gimcheon Sangmu (draft)	2020	K League 1	0	0	0	0	—		—		—		0	0
Gimcheon Sangmu (draft)	2021	K League 2	8	0	1	0	—		—		—		9	0
Gimcheon Sangmu (draft)	Total		8	0	1	0	—		—		—		9	0
Birmingham City	2024–25	League One	3	0	0	0	—		—		—		3	0
Daejeon Hana Citizen	2025	K League 1	15	2	—		—		—		—		15	2
Daejeon Hana Citizen	2026	K League 1	28	2	1	0	—		2	0	1 (Note: Appearance in K League Super Cup)	0	32	2
Daejeon Hana Citizen	Total		43	4	1	0	—		2	0	1	0	47	4
Career total			252	5	20	0	0	0	40	2	1	0	313	7

=== International ===
As of match played 17 November 2026

Appearances and goals by national team and year
National team	Year	Apps	Goals
South Korea	2024	7	0
South Korea	2025	3	0
South Korea	2026	2	0
Career total		12	0

== Honours ==
Ulsan HD

- K League 1: 2022, 2023, 2024
- Korean FA Cup: 2017

Gimcheon Sangmu

- K League 2: 2021

Birmingham City

- EFL League One: 2024-25

Individual

- K League 1 Best XI: 2024, 2025
