= Alfons Sampsted =

Icelandic footballer (born 1998)

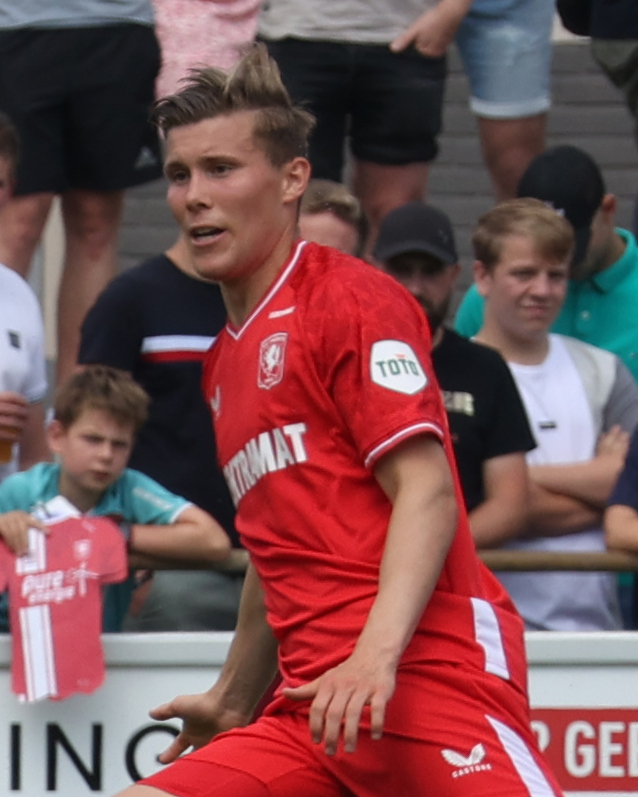
- Sampsted with Twente in 2023

Personal information
- Date of birth: 6 April 1998 (age 28)
- Place of birth: Kópavogur, Iceland
- Height: 1.80 m (5 ft 11 in)
- Position: Right back

Team information
- Current team: Go Ahead Eagles
- Number: 2

Youth career
- –2016: Breiðablik

Senior career*
Years	Team	Apps	(Gls)
2015–2016	Breiðablik	17	(0)
2015	→ Þór Akureyri (loan)	9	(0)
2017–2019	IFK Norrköping	2	(0)
2017	→ IF Sylvia (loan)	3	(0)
2018	→ Landskrona BoIS (loan)	12	(1)
2019	→ IF Sylvia (loan)	16	(1)
2019	→ Breiðablik (loan)	8	(1)
2020–2022	Bodø/Glimt	88	(1)
2023–2025	Twente	37	(0)
2024–2026	Birmingham City	23	(1)
2026–	Go Ahead Eagles	21	(0)

International career
2014	Iceland U16	7	(0)
2014–2015	Iceland U17	8	(0)
2015–2016	Iceland U19	10	(0)
2017–2020	Iceland U21	30	(1)
2020–2024	Iceland	23	(0)
- * Club domestic league appearances and goals as of 23 October 2026

Alfons Sampsted (born 6 April 1998) is an Icelandic professional footballer who plays as a right-back for Eredivisie club Go Ahead Eagles and the Iceland national team.

== Club career ==
=== Breiðablik ===
Alfons started his career with local club Breiðablik in Kópavogur in 2015, playing a single cup game, before going on loan to Þór from Akureyri for the latter half of the season. In 2016, he played most of Breiðablik's games as they finished 6th in the 2016 Úrvalsdeild.

=== Norrköping ===
In January 2017, Alfons was transferred to Swedish club IFK Norrköping. He spent three seasons there without ever cementing his place, spending time on loan at IF Sylvia and Landskrona BoIS in Sweden and Breiðablik in Iceland.

=== Bodø/Glimt ===
In February 2020, Alfons joined Norwegian club Bodø/Glimt and was a key player in the 2020 season as the club won their first national title. There, he replaced former right-back Erlend Reitan who was on loan from Rosenborg.

=== Twente ===
On 27 December 2022, Alfons joined Dutch club FC Twente.

=== Birmingham City ===
On 12 August 2024, Alfons joined League One (third-tier) club Birmingham City on a season-long loan. The deal included an option to purchase. He made "a solid, no- nonsense debut" the next day as a second-half substitute in Birmingham's 1–0 EFL Cup win away to Charlton Athletic. Following a title-winning campaign, the English club exercised their purchase option at the end of the 2024–25 season.

=== Go Ahead Eagles ===
On 24 January 2026, Alfons returned to the Netherlands to join Go Ahead Eagles for an undisclosed fee.

== International career ==
As of 15 November 2020, Alfons is the highest-capped player of the Icelandic U21 national team with 30 games.

== Career statistics ==
=== Club ===
As of match played 27 October 2026

Appearances and goals by club, season and competition
Club	Season	League			National cup (Note: Includes Icelandic Cup, Svenska Cupen, Norwegian Cup, KNVB Cup, FA Cup)		League cup (Note: Includes EFL Cup)		Continental		Other		Total	
Club	Season	Division	Apps	Goals	Apps	Goals	Apps	Goals	Apps	Goals	Apps	Goals	Apps	Goals
Breiðablik	2015	Úrvalsdeild	0	0	1	0			—		—		1	0
Breiðablik	2016	Úrvalsdeild	17	0	0	0			1 (Note: Appearance(s) in UEFA Europa League)	0	—		18	0
Breiðablik	Total		17	0	1	0			1	0	—		19	0
Þór Akureyri (loan)	2015	1. deild	9	0	0	0			—		—		9	0
Norrköping	2017	Allsvenskan	2	0	1	0	—		1	0	—		4	0
Norrköping	2018	Allsvenskan	0	0	1	0	—		—		—		1	0
Norrköping	Total		2	0	2	0	—		1	0	—		5	0
Landskrona (loan)	2018	Superettan	12	1	1	0	—		—		—		13	1
Sylvia (loan)	2019	Ettan	16	1	0	0	—		—		—		16	1
Breiðablik (loan)	2019	Úrvalsdeild	8	1	1	0			—		—		9	1
Bodø/Glimt	2020	Eliteserien	29	0	—		—		3	0	—		32	0
Bodø/Glimt	2021	Eliteserien	29	0	3	1	—		14 (Note: Two appearances in UEFA Champions League, twelve in UEFA Conference League)	0	—		46	1
Bodø/Glimt	2022	Eliteserien	30	1	6	0	—		20 (Note: Six appearances and one goal in UEFA Conference League, eight appearances and one goal in UEFA Champions League, six appearances in UEFA Europa League)	2	—		56	3
Bodø/Glimt	Total		88	1	9	1	—		37	2	—		134	4
Twente	2022–23	Eredivisie	13	0	2	0	—		0	0	—		15	0
Twente	2023–24	Eredivisie	24	0	0	0	—		5	1	—		29	1
Twente	2024–25	Eredivisie	0	0	0	0	—		0	0	—		0	0
Twente	Total		37	0	2	0	—		5 (Note: Appearance(s) in UEFA Conference League)	1	—		44	1
Birmingham City (loan)	2024–25	League One	17	1	2	0	2	0	—		2 (Note: Appearances in EFL Trophy)	0	23	1
Birmingham City (loan)	2025–26	Championship	6	0	1	0	1	0	—		—		8	0
Birmingham City (loan)	Total		23	1	3	0	3	0	—		2	0	31	1
Go Ahead Eagles	2025–26	Eredivisie	11	0	1	1	—		—		—		12	1
Go Ahead Eagles	2026–27	Eredivisie	10	0	1	0	—		—		—		11	0
Go Ahead Eagles	Total		21	0	2	1	—		—		—		23	1
Career total			233	5	21	2	3	0	44	3	2	0	303	10

=== International ===
Appearances and goals by national team and year
National team	Year	Apps	Goals
Iceland	2020	2	0
Iceland	2021	5	0
Iceland	2022	7	0
Iceland	2023	7	0
Iceland	2024	2	0
Total		23	0

== Honours ==
Bodø/Glimt

- Eliteserien: 2020, 2021

Birmingham City

- EFL League One: 2024–25
