= Ryan Allsop =

English footballer (born 1992)

Personal information
- Full name: Ryan Allsop
- Date of birth: 17 June 1992 (age 34)
- Place of birth: Birmingham, England
- Height: 6 ft 2 in (1.89 m)
- Position: Goalkeeper

Team information
- Current team: Birmingham City
- Number: 21

Youth career
- 2007–2010: West Bromwich Albion

Senior career*
Years	Team	Apps	(Gls)
2010–2011	West Bromwich Albion	0	(0)
2010	→ Stockport County (loan)	0	(0)
2011–2012	Millwall	0	(0)
2012	Höttur	8	(0)
2012–2013	Leyton Orient	20	(0)
2013–2018	AFC Bournemouth	24	(0)
2014	→ Coventry City (loan)	24	(0)
2016	→ Wycombe Wanderers (loan)	18	(0)
2016	→ Portsmouth (loan)	0	(0)
2017–2018	→ Blackpool (loan)	22	(0)
2018	→ Lincoln City (loan)	16	(0)
2018–2021	Wycombe Wanderers	99	(0)
2021–2022	Derby County	30	(0)
2022–2023	Cardiff City	44	(0)
2023–2024	Hull City	37	(0)
2024–	Birmingham City	49	(0)

International career
2008	England U17	5	(0)
- * Club domestic league appearances and goals as of 17:10, 7 March 2026 (UTC)

Ryan Allsop (born 17 June 1992) is an English professional footballer who plays as a goalkeeper for EFL Championship club Birmingham City.

He started his career as a youth player at West Bromwich Albion, before moving to Millwall in 2011. After short spells with Icelandic club Höttur, with whom he made his debut in senior football, and Leyton Orient, with whom he first appeared in the Football League, he joined AFC Bournemouth in 2013. He spent time on loan at Coventry City, Wycombe Wanderers, Portsmouth, Blackpool and Lincoln City, and made 23 league appearances for Bournemouth, including two in the Premier League, before returning to Wycombe Wanderers in 2018 for three seasons.

== Club career ==
=== West Bromwich Albion ===
Allsop began his career in the youth ranks at West Bromwich Albion, progressing to the reserve team before being called up to sit on the bench for a first team match against Wigan Athletic. During his time at West Bromwich, he was called up to the England U17 team, and he also spent time on loan with Stockport County, although he did not play.

=== Millwall ===
He was signed by Millwall manager Kenny Jackett in May 2011, but he did not make a first-team appearance for the Lions, and was released in April 2012 after becoming fourth-choice goalkeeper at the club. He subsequently signed a short-term deal with Icelandic club Höttur, making 10 appearances in league and cup before moving back to England and signing for Leyton Orient on a six-month contract in July 2012.

=== Leyton Orient ===
With Orient's first- and second-choice goalkeepers Jamie Jones and Lee Butcher injured, Allsop made his professional debut in the first game of the 2012–13 season, a Football League Cup tie at Charlton Athletic on 14 August 2012. The match ended in a 1–1 draw and a penalty shoot-out, in which Allsop saved Johnnie Jackson's penalty as Orient went through to the second round 4–3. He made his league debut on 1 September in the 1–0 defeat at Crawley Town.

=== Bournemouth ===
Allsop signed for AFC Bournemouth on a free transfer on 18 January 2013.

On 4 July 2014, Allsop joined Coventry on loan until January 2015.

On 29 November 2015, Allsop made his Premier League debut as a Bournemouth player, coming on as a substitute at half time in a 3–3 draw against Everton.

On 1 February 2016, Allsop joined League Two side, Wycombe Wanderers on loan until the end of the 2015–16 season.

On 12 May 2016, Allsop joined Portsmouth on a seven-day emergency loan for their play-off semi-final first leg against Plymouth Argyle.

On 18 July 2017, Allsop joined Blackpool F.C. on a season-long loan, before the Loan was terminated on 8 January 2018.

On 31 January 2018, following the injury to first team goalkeeper Josh Vickers, Allsop Joined Lincoln City F.C. until the end of the season. 6 days later his save proved crucial as Lincoln won 4–2 on penalties in the semi-finals of the EFL Trophy against Chelsea Under-21s, and he then played in the final at Wembley as Lincoln won the competition.

He was released by Bournemouth at the end of the 2017–18 season.

=== Wycombe Wanderers ===
On 21 June 2018, Allsop re-joined Wycombe Wanderers on a three-year contract. During the 2020/21 season Allsop lost his place to David Stockdale. It was announced on 12 May 2021 that he would not be offered a new deal at Wycombe and he would leave at the end of the season.

=== Derby County ===
On 6 August 2021, Allsop signed a one-year contract with Derby County following a trial period with the club.

=== Cardiff City ===
On 16 June 2022, Allsop agreed a two-year deal to join Cardiff City upon the expiration of his contract with Derby County on 1 July.

=== Hull City ===
On 30 August 2023, Hull City signed Allsop on a two-year deal for an undisclosed fee, reuniting him with head coach Liam Rosenior who worked with him at Derby County.

=== Birmingham City ===
On 18 June 2024, Birmingham City signed Allsop on a three-year deal for an undisclosed fee. Neither Allsop nor fellow new arrival Bailey Peacock-Farrell took squad number 1, and both indicated they would support each other whoever was chosen for the first team. Peacock-Farrell started the opening league fixture, while Allsop came in for the visit to Charlton Athletic in the EFL Cup. He saved Tyreece Campbell's 13th-minute penalty and performed well during the rest of the match, which Birmingham went on to win 1–0. His performances in Birmingham's 2024-25 promotion season earned him a place the PFA League One Team of the Year. The club earned triple-digit points and he was one of their seven members to be selected.

== Career statistics ==
As of 7 March 2026

Appearances and goals by club, season and competition
Club	Season	League			National cup (Note: Includes FA Cup, Icelandic Cup)		League Cup		Other		Total	
Club	Season	Division	Apps	Goals	Apps	Goals	Apps	Goals	Apps	Goals	Apps	Goals
West Bromwich Albion	2009–10	Championship	0	0	0	0	0	0	0	0	0	0
West Bromwich Albion	2010–11	Premier League	0	0	0	0	0	0	0	0	0	0
West Bromwich Albion	Total		0	0	0	0	0	0	0	0	0	0
Stockport County (loan)	2010–11	League Two	0	0	0	0	0	0	0	0	0	0
Millwall	2011–12	Championship	0	0	0	0	0	0	0	0	0	0
Höttur	2012	1. deild karla	8	0	3	0	0	0	0	0	11	0
Leyton Orient	2012–13	League One	20	0	2	0	1	0	1 (Note: Appearance(s) in Football League Trophy)	0	24	0
AFC Bournemouth	2012–13	League One	10	0	0	0	0	0	0	0	10	0
AFC Bournemouth	2013–14	Championship	12	0	1	0	2	0	0	0	15	0
AFC Bournemouth	2014–15	Championship	0	0	0	0	0	0	0	0	0	0
AFC Bournemouth	2015–16	Premier League	1	0	0	0	0	0	0	0	1	0
AFC Bournemouth	2016–17	Premier League	1	0	0	0	0	0	0	0	1	0
AFC Bournemouth	Total		24	0	1	0	2	0	0	0	27	0
Coventry City (loan)	2014–15	League One	24	0	1	0	0	0	2	0	27	0
Wycombe Wanderers (loan)	2015–16	League Two	18	0	0	0	0	0	0	0	18	0
Portsmouth (loan)	2015–16	League Two	0	0	0	0	0	0	2 (Note: Appearances in League Two play-offs)	0	2	0
Blackpool (loan)	2017–18	League One	22	0	1	0	0	0	0	0	23	0
Lincoln City (loan)	2017–18	League Two	16	0	0	0	0	0	4 (Note: Two appearances in EFL Trophy, two in League Two play-offs)	0	20	0
Wycombe Wanderers	2018–19	League One	38	0	1	0	2	0	0	0	41	0
Wycombe Wanderers	2019–20	League One	32	0	2	0	1	0	3 (Note: Appearances in League One play-offs)	0	38	0
Wycombe Wanderers	2020–21	Championship	29	0	2	0	1	0	0	0	32	0
Wycombe Wanderers	Total		99	0	5	0	4	0	3	0	111	0
Derby County	2021–22	Championship	30	0	1	0	2	0	0	0	33	0
Cardiff City	2022–23	Championship	44	0	0	0	0	0	0	0	44	0
Hull City	2023–24	Championship	37	0	1	0	0	0	0	0	38	0
Birmingham City	2024–25	League One	38	0	1	0	2	0	4 (Note: Appearances in EFL Trophy)	0	45	0
Birmingham City	2025–26	Championship	11	0	1	0	0	0	0	0	12	0
Birmingham City	Total		49	0	2	0	2	0	4	0	57	0
Career total			391	0	17	0	11	0	16	0	435	0

== Honours ==
Lincoln City

- EFL Trophy: 2017–18

Wycombe Wanderers

- EFL League One play-offs: 2020

Birmingham City

- EFL League One: 2024–25
- EFL Trophy runner-up: 2024–25

Individual

- PFA Team of the Year: 2024–25 League One
