= Luke Harris =

Footballer (born 2005)

- Harris with Wigan Athletic in 2026

Personal information
- Full name: Luke Bernard Harris
- Date of birth: 4 March 2005 (age 21)
- Place of birth: Jersey, Channel Islands
- Height: 1.77 m (5 ft 10 in)
- Positions: Attacking midfielder; left winger

Team information
- Current team: Wigan Athletic (on loan from Fulham)
- Number: 13

Youth career
- Fulham

Senior career*
Years	Team	Apps	(Gls)
2022−	Fulham	4	(0)
2024	→ Exeter City (loan)	21	(4)
2024–2025	→ Birmingham City (loan)	29	(3)
2025–2026	→ Oxford United (loan)	16	(1)
2026	→ Wycombe Wanderers (loan)	4	(0)
2026–	→ Wigan Athletic (loan)	3	(0)

International career^{‡}
2021−2022	Wales U17	5	(3)
2021	Wales U18	1	(1)
2021	Wales U19	2	(1)
2023–	Wales U21	11	(1)
- * Club domestic league appearances and goals as of 14:29, 6 September 2026 (UTC) ‡ National team caps and goals as of 18:12, l4 October 2025 (UTC)

Luke Bernard Harris (born 4 March 2005) is a professional footballer who plays as an attacking midfielder or left winger for EFL League One club Wigan Athletic, on loan from Premier League club Fulham. He has represented Wales from under-17 to under-21 level.

== Personal life ==
Born in Jersey, Harris attended St. Clement School on the island. He also attended Le Rocquier School as well as Coombe Boys' School.

== Club career ==
Harris made headlines when he scored a hat-trick in eleven minutes for Fulham's under-23 side against Newcastle United under-23s in February 2022. In the summer of 2022 he attended summer training camps and played friendlies with the Fulham first team. Harris was named in the starting eleven for the Fulham first team for the first time on 23 August 2022 for an EFL Cup match away against Crawley Town. In September 2022 Harris was rewarded with a new professional contract with Fulham lasting until 2025, and began training daily with the first-team squad. First-team manager Marco Silva described him as "an offensive midfielder. He has one thing that is really important in football today – the ability to arrive in the box and score goals. It is something that is not easy to find in a midfielder, to be in the right spots. He has it. It's up to us to keep working with him and to make him grow in the other aspects. That will be important for him." Harris made his Premier League debut on 20 October 2022 appearing as a substitute in a 3–0 home win over Aston Villa.

In February 2023, Harris was awarded the 'Rising Star Award' at the 2022 Channel Islands Sports Awards.

On 3 January 2024, Harris joined League One side Exeter City on loan until the end of the season.

Harris joined League One club Birmingham City on 4 August 2024 on loan for the 2024–25 season. He made his debut in the opening fixture of the season, replacing Willum Þór Willumsson soon after half-time with Birmingham 1–0 down at home to Reading; he "injected some urgency into Blues' play and found himself in some good positions" as his team drew the match via a late penalty.

On 25 July 2025, Harris joined Championship club Oxford United on a season-long loan. He scored his first goal for the club in a 1–1 draw with Middlesbrough on 22 November 2025. On 7 January 2026 Harris was recalled from his loan by Fulham. Twelve days later, he joined Wycombe Wanderers on loan until the end of the season.

On 21 August 2026, Harris joined League One club Wigan Athletic on a season-long loan deal with an option to buy.

== International career ==
Harris was born in Jersey to a Welsh father and Irish mother. He captained the Wales under-17 international age group side, and was called up for the Wales under-19s for the 2022 UEFA European Under-19 Championship Group 10 qualifying matches in Norway against Georgia, Norway and Kosovo on 6, 9 and 12 October 2021.

In September 2022 Harris was called up to the senior Wales squad for the UEFA Nations League matches against Belgium and Poland on 22 and 25 September 2022.

In August 2023 Harris was called up to the Wales under-21 squad for the first time.

== Career statistics ==
=== Club ===
As of 2 September 2026

Appearances and goals by club, season and competition
Club	Season	League			FA Cup		EFL Cup		Other		Total	
Club	Season	Division	Apps	Goals	Apps	Goals	Apps	Goals	Apps	Goals	Apps	Goals
Fulham	2022–23	Premier League	3	0	1	0	1	0	—		5	0
Fulham	2023–24	Premier League	1	0	1	0	1	0	—		3	0
Fulham	2024–25	Premier League	0	0	—		—		—		0	0
Fulham	2025–26	Premier League	0	0	—		—		—		0	0
Fulham	2026–27	Premier League	0	0	—		—		—		0	0
Fulham	Total		4	0	2	0	2	0	0	0	8	0
Fulham U21	2023–24	—			—		—		2 (Note: Appearances in EFL Trophy)	0	2	0
Exeter City (loan)	2023–24	League One	21	4	—		—		—		21	4
Birmingham City (loan)	2024–25	League One	29	3	3	0	1	0	3	1	36	4
Oxford United (loan)	2025–26	Championship	16	1	—		1	0	—		17	1
Wycombe Wanderers (loan)	2025–26	League One	19	2	0	0	0	0	0	0	19	2
Wigan Athletic (loan)	2026–27	League One	3	0	0	0	0	0	0	0	3	0
Career total			92	10	5	0	4	0	5	1	106	11

== Honours ==
Birmingham City

- EFL League One: 2024–25
- EFL Trophy runner-up: 2024–25
