= Tomoki Iwata =

Japanese footballer (born 1997)

Tomoki Iwata 岩田 智輝
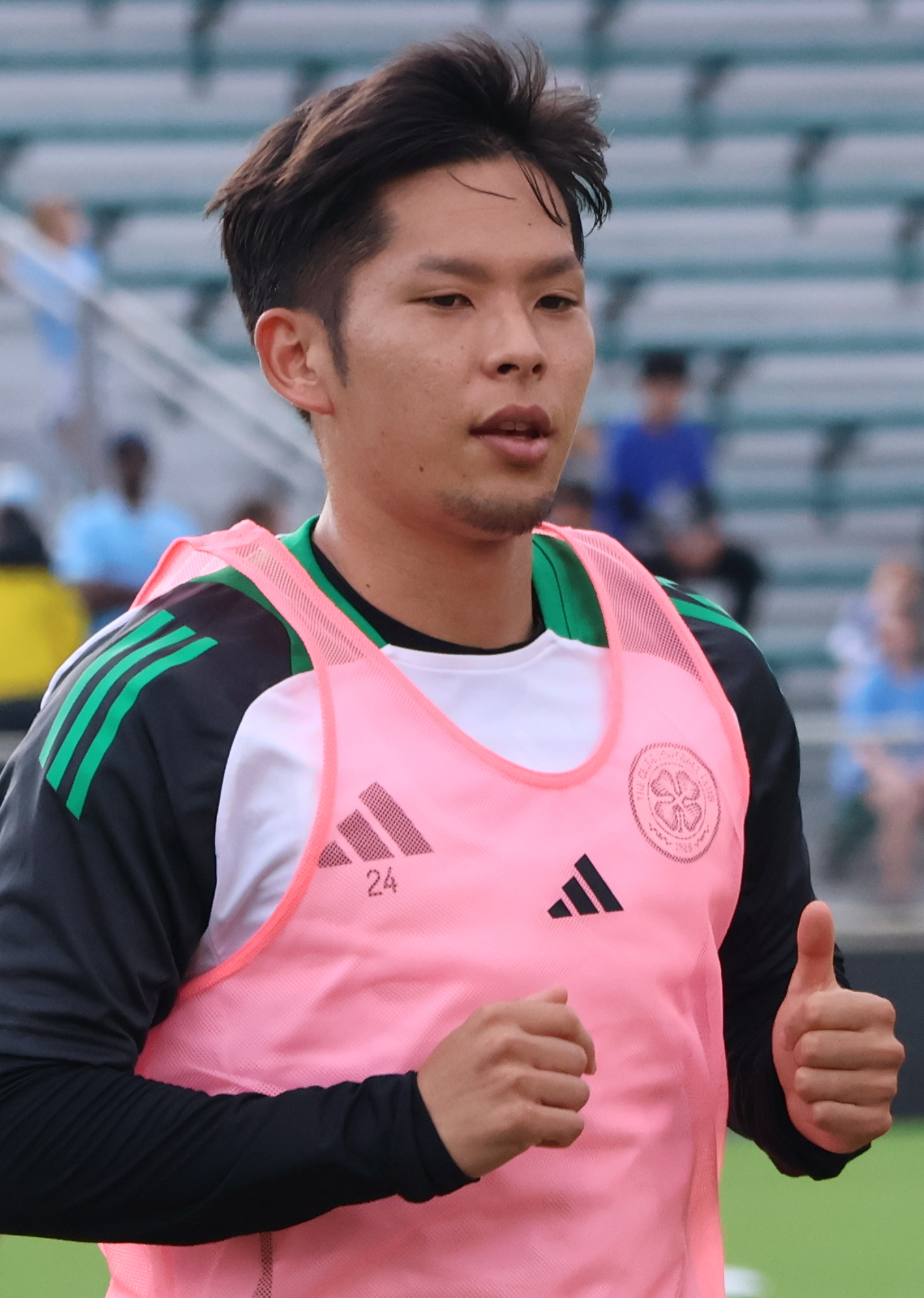
- Iwata training with Celtic in 2024

Personal information
- Full name: Tomoki Iwata
- Date of birth: 7 April 1997 (age 29)
- Place of birth: Usa, Ōita, Japan
- Height: 1.78 m (5 ft 10 in)
- Position: Defensive midfielder

Team information
- Current team: Birmingham City
- Number: 24

Youth career
- Yokkaichi Minami SSC
- –2015: Oita Trinita

Senior career*
| Years | Team | Apps | (Gls) |
| 2016–2020 | Oita Trinita | 113 | (7) |
| 2021–2022 | Yokohama F. Marinos | 66 | (2) |
| 2023 | → Celtic (loan) | 13 | (0) |
| 2023–2024 | Celtic | 19 | (1) |
| 2024– | Birmingham City | 95 | (9) |

International career^{‡}
| 2015 | Japan U18 | 5 | (0) |
| 2016 | Japan U19 | 7 | (0) |
| 2017 | Japan U23 | 3 | (0) |
| 2019– | Japan | 4 | (0) |
Medal record
Men's football
Representing Japan
EAFF Championship
| Winner | 2022 Japan | Team |
AFC U-19 Championship
| Gold medal – first place | 2016 Bahrain |
- * Club domestic league appearances and goals as of 17:56, 13 October 2026 (UTC) ‡ National team caps and goals as of 15:03, 23 November 2024 (UTC)

Tomoki Iwata (岩田 智輝, Iwata Tomoki; born 7 April 1997) is a Japanese professional footballer who plays as a defensive midfielder for EFL Championship club Birmingham City and the Japan national team.

== Club career ==
=== Oita Trinita ===
Born in Ōita, Iwata began his youth career with Oita Trinita in 2015, before signing professionally the following year, in 2016.

=== Yokohama F. Marinos ===
In 2021, Iwata signed for J1 club, Yokohama F. Marinos. On 5 November 2022, he led the club to the 2022 J1 League title. Two days later, he was named among the Best XI of the season and also voted Player of the Year.

=== Celtic ===
On 30 December 2022, Iwata signed for Scottish Premiership side Celtic on an initial loan deal with a compulsory purchase clause. This has seen Iwata reunited with his former Yokohama manager, Ange Postecoglou. On 21 January 2023, Iwata made his debut for the club in a 5–0 win against Greenock Morton in the Scottish Cup.

Celtic confirmed in July 2023 that Iwata had signed for the club on a permanent basis.

=== Birmingham City ===
On 30 August 2024, Iwata signed a three-year contract with recently relegated EFL League One club Birmingham City, for an undisclosed fee. His performances in Birmingham's 2024-25 promotion season earned him a place in the PFA League One Team of the Year. The club earned triple-digit points and he was one of their seven members to be selected.

== International career ==
On 24 May 2019, Iwata was called up by Japan's head coach Hajime Moriyasu to feature in the Copa América played in Brazil. He made his debut on 20 June 2019 in the game against Uruguay, as a starter.

== Career statistics ==
=== Club ===
As of 10 October 2026

Appearances and goals by club, season and competition
| Club | Season | League | | | National cup (Note: Includes Emperor's Cup, Scottish Cup, FA Cup) | | League cup (Note: Includes J.League Cup, Scottish League Cup, EFL Cup) | | Continental | | Other | | Total | |
| Club | Season | Division | Apps | Goals | Apps | Goals | Apps | Goals | Apps | Goals | Apps | Goals | Apps | Goals |
|---|---|---|---|---|---|---|---|---|---|---|---|---|---|---|
| Oita Trinita | 2015 | J2 League | 0 | 0 | 1 | 0 | — | | — | | — | | 1 | 0 |
| Oita Trinita | 2016 | J3 League | 24 | 1 | 1 | 0 | — | | — | | — | | 25 | 1 |
| Oita Trinita | 2017 | J2 League | 12 | 0 | 0 | 0 | — | | — | | — | | 12 | 0 |
| Oita Trinita | 2018 | J2 League | 20 | 0 | 1 | 1 | — | | — | | — | | 21 | 1 |
| Oita Trinita | 2019 | J1 League | 27 | 4 | 1 | 0 | 3 | 0 | — | | — | | 31 | 4 |
| Oita Trinita | 2020 | J1 League | 30 | 2 | 0 | 0 | 0 | 0 | — | | — | | 30 | 2 |
| Oita Trinita | Total | | 113 | 7 | 4 | 1 | 3 | 0 | — | | — | | 120 | 8 |
| Yokohama F. Marinos | 2021 | J1 League | 34 | 0 | 1 | 0 | 7 | 1 | — | | — | | 42 | 1 |
| Yokohama F. Marinos | 2022 | J1 League | 32 | 2 | 1 | 0 | 0 | 0 | 7 (Note: Appearances in AFC Champions League) | 0 | — | | 40 | 2 |
| Yokohama F. Marinos | Total | | 66 | 2 | 2 | 0 | 7 | 1 | 7 | 0 | 0 | 0 | 82 | 3 |
| Celtic (loan) | 2022–23 | Scottish Premiership | 13 | 0 | 4 | 0 | 1 | 0 | — | | — | | 18 | 0 |
| Celtic | 2023–24 | Scottish Premiership | 19 | 1 | 2 | 0 | 0 | 0 | 3 (Note: Appearances in UEFA Champions League) | 0 | — | | 24 | 1 |
| Celtic | Total | | 32 | 1 | 6 | 0 | 1 | 0 | 3 | 0 | 0 | 0 | 42 | 1 |
| Birmingham City | 2024–25 | League One | 40 | 6 | 2 | 1 | 0 | 0 | — | | 5 (Note: Appearances in EFL Trophy) | 1 | 47 | 8 |
| Birmingham City | 2025–26 | Championship | 42 | 3 | 1 | 0 | 1 | 0 | — | | — | | 44 | 3 |
| Birmingham City | 2026–27 | Championship | 9 | 0 | 0 | 0 | 2 | 0 | — | | — | | 11 | 0 |
| Birmingham City | Total | | 91 | 9 | 3 | 1 | 3 | 0 | — | | 5 | 1 | 102 | 11 |
| Career total | | | 302 | 19 | 15 | 2 | 14 | 1 | 10 | 0 | 5 | 1 | 346 | 23 |

=== International ===
As of match played 27 July 2022

Appearances and goals by national team and year
| National team | Year | Apps | Goals |
|---|---|---|---|
| Japan | 2019 | 2 | 0 |
| Japan | 2022 | 2 | 0 |
| Total | | 4 | 0 |

== Honours ==
Yokohama F. Marinos

- J1 League: 2022

Celtic

- Scottish Premiership: 2022–232023–24
- Scottish Cup: 2022–23, 2023–24
- Scottish League Cup: 2022–23

Birmingham City

- EFL League One: 2024–25
- EFL Trophy runner-up: 2024–25

Japan

- EAFF Championship: 2022

Individual

- J.League MVP Award: 2022
- J.League Best XI: 2022
- EFL League One Team of the Season: 2024–25
- PFA Team of the Year: 2024–25 League One
