= PFA Team of the Year (2020s) =

Annual English football award

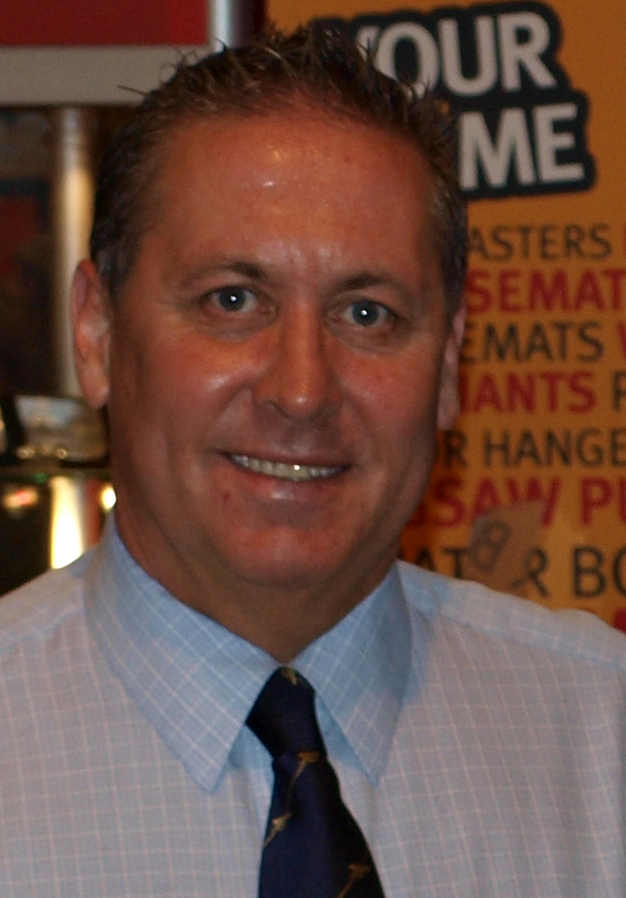
Kenny Sansom appeared in a PFA Team of the Year on 11 occasions, which is more than any other player.

The Professional Footballers' Association Team of the Year (often called the PFA Team of the Year, or simply the Team of the Year) is an annual award given to a set of 55 footballers across the top four tiers of men's English football; the Premier League, the Championship, League One and League Two, as well as the women's FA WSL, who are seen to be deserving of being named in a "Team of the Year". Peter Shilton currently holds the most appearances in the PFA Team of the Year in the top division with 10 appearances. Steven Gerrard currently holds the most appearances in the PFA Team of the Year in the Premier League era with eight appearances.

The award has been presented since the 1973–74 season and the shortlist is compiled by the members of the players' trade union, the Professional Footballers' Association (PFA), in January of every year, with the winners then being voted for by the other players in their respective divisions. The award is regarded by players in the Football League as the highest accolade available to them, due to it being picked by their fellow professionals. Oxford United's Damian Batt, who was named in the Team of the Year for League Two in 2011, said he was "very pleased to be given such a prestigious award. It is something that I am very proud of". In 2014, a team for female players competing in the FA WSL was selected for the first time.

== Key ==
- Heading key: Pos. – Position; App. – Number of appearances in a PFA Team of the Year.
- Position key: GK – Goalkeeper; DF – Defender; MF – Midfielder; FW – Forward.
- Players marked † appeared in a first tier PFA Team of the Year more than once.
- Players marked ‡ appeared in a second tier PFA Team of the Year more than once.
- Players marked * appeared in a third tier PFA Team of the Year more than once.
- Players marked ¤ appeared in a fourth tier PFA Team of the Year more than once.

== Winners ==
=== 2019–20 ===
==== Premier League ====
Pos.	Player	Club	App.
GK	Nick Pope	Burnley	1
DF	Trent Alexander-Arnold †	Liverpool	2
DF	Virgil van Dijk †	Liverpool	2
DF	Çağlar Söyüncü	Leicester City	1
DF	Andy Robertson †	Liverpool	2
MF	Kevin De Bruyne †	Manchester City	2
MF	David Silva †	Manchester City	3
MF	Jordan Henderson	Liverpool	1
FW	Jamie Vardy †	Leicester City	2
FW	Pierre-Emerick Aubameyang	Arsenal	1
FW	Sadio Mané †	Liverpool	3

==== Championship ====
Pos.	Player	Club	App.
GK	Brice Samba	Nottingham Forest	1
DF	Luke Ayling	Leeds United	1
DF	Ben White	Leeds United	1
DF	Liam Cooper ‡	Leeds United	3
DF	Joe Bryan	Fulham	2
MF	Romaine Sawyers	West Bromwich Albion	2
MF	Kalvin Phillips	Leeds United	1
MF	Eberechi Eze	Queens Park Rangers	1
FW	Saïd Benrahma	Brentford	1
FW	Ollie Watkins	Brentford	1
FW	Aleksandar Mitrović	Fulham	1

==== League One ====
Pos.	Player	Club	App.
GK	Marko Maroši	Coventry City	1
DF	Joe Jacobson	Wycombe Wanderers	2
DF	Robert Dickie	Oxford United	1
DF	Michael Ihiekwe	Rotherham United	1
DF	Fankaty Dabo	Coventry City	1
MF	Matt Crooks	Rotherham United	2
MF	Liam Walsh	Coventry City	1
MF	Cameron Brannagan	Oxford United	1
FW	Matt Godden	Coventry City	1
FW	Ivan Toney	Peterborough United	1
FW	Armand Gnanduillet	Blackpool	1

==== League Two ====
Pos.	Player	Club	App.
GK	Alex Palmer	Plymouth Argyle	1
DF	Randell Williams	Exeter City	1
DF	Charlie Goode	Northampton Town	1
DF	Ben Tozer	Cheltenham Town	1
DF	Perry Ng	Crewe Alexandra	1
MF	Nicky Adams ¤	Northampton Town	2
MF	Danny Mayor ¤	Plymouth Argyle	3
MF	Antoni Sarcevic ¤	Plymouth Argyle	2
FW	Jerry Yates	Swindon Town	1
FW	Eoin Doyle	Swindon Town	2
FW	Charlie Kirk	Crewe Alexandra	1

==== FA WSL ====
Pos.	Player	Club	App.
GK	Ann-Katrin Berger †	Chelsea	2
DF	Maren Mjelde †	Chelsea	2
DF	Millie Bright †	Chelsea	2
DF	Leah Williamson	Arsenal	1
DF	Magdalena Eriksson	Chelsea	1
MF	Ji So-yun †	Chelsea	5
MF	Kim Little †	Arsenal	2
MF	Caroline Weir †	Manchester City	2
FW	Vivianne Miedema †	Arsenal	2
FW	Chloe Kelly	Manchester City	1
FW	Beth England	Chelsea	1

=== 2020–21 ===
==== Premier League ====
Pos.	Player	Club	App.
GK	Ederson †	Manchester City	2
DF	João Cancelo	Manchester City	1
DF	John Stones	Manchester City	1
DF	Rúben Dias	Manchester City	1
DF	Luke Shaw †	Manchester United	2
MF	Kevin De Bruyne †	Manchester City	3
MF	İlkay Gündoğan	Manchester City	1
MF	Bruno Fernandes	Manchester United	1
FW	Harry Kane †	Tottenham Hotspur	5
FW	Mohamed Salah †	Liverpool	2
FW	Son Heung-min	Tottenham Hotspur	1

==== Championship ====
Pos.	Player	Club	App.
GK	Tim Krul	Norwich City	1
DF	Max Aarons ‡	Norwich City	2
DF	Ethan Pinnock	Brentford	2
DF	Grant Hanley	Norwich City	1
DF	Rico Henry	Brentford	2
MF	Emiliano Buendía	Norwich City	1
MF	Michael Olise	Reading	1
MF	Oliver Skipp	Norwich City	1
FW	Adam Armstrong	Blackburn Rovers	2
FW	Ivan Toney	Brentford	2
FW	Teemu Pukki ‡	Norwich City	2

==== League One ====
Pos.	Player	Club	App.
GK	Chris Maxwell	Blackpool	1
DF	Callum Elder	Hull City	1
DF	Lewie Coyle	Hull City	1
DF	Lewis Montsma	Lincoln City	1
DF	Robert Atkinson	Oxford United	1
MF	Aiden McGeady *	Sunderland	2
MF	George Honeyman	Hull City	1
MF	Jorge Grant	Lincoln City	2
FW	Charlie Wyke	Sunderland	1
FW	Jonson Clarke-Harris	Peterborough United	1
FW	Mallik Wilks	Hull City	1

==== League Two ====
Pos.	Player	Club	App.
GK	Václav Hladký	Salford City	1
DF	Ben Tozer ¤	Cheltenham Town	2
DF	Kyle Knoyle	Cambridge United	1
DF	Ricardo Santos	Bolton Wanderers	1
DF	Will Boyle	Cheltenham Town	1
MF	Josh Sheehan	Newport County	1
MF	Matt Jay	Exeter City	1
MF	Wes Hoolahan	Cambridge United	4
FW	Eoin Doyle ¤	Bolton Wanderers	3
FW	Paul Mullin	Cambridge United	1
FW	James Vaughan	Tranmere Rovers	2

==== FA WSL ====
Pos.	Player	Club	App.
GK	Ann-Katrin Berger †	Chelsea	3
DF	Katie McCabe	Arsenal	1
DF	Leah Williamson †	Arsenal	2
DF	Magdalena Eriksson †	Chelsea	2
DF	Maren Mjelde †	Chelsea	3
MF	Sam Mewis	Manchester City	1
MF	Caroline Weir †	Manchester City	3
MF	Sam Kerr	Chelsea	1
FW	Chloe Kelly †	Manchester City	2
MF	Fran Kirby †	Chelsea	2
FW	Lauren Hemp	Manchester City	1

=== 2021–22 ===
==== Premier League ====
Pos.	Player	Club	App.
GK	Alisson Becker	Liverpool	1
DF	Trent Alexander-Arnold †	Liverpool	3
DF	Virgil van Dijk †	Liverpool	3
DF	Antonio Rüdiger	Chelsea	1
DF	João Cancelo †	Manchester City	2
MF	Bernardo Silva †	Manchester City	2
MF	Thiago	Liverpool	1
MF	Kevin De Bruyne †	Manchester City	4
FW	Sadio Mané †	Liverpool	4
FW	Cristiano Ronaldo †	Manchester United	5
FW	Mohamed Salah †	Liverpool	3

==== Championship ====
Pos.	Player	Club	App.
GK	Lee Nicholls	Huddersfield Town	1
DF	Djed Spence	Nottingham Forest	1
DF	Tosin Adarabioyo	Fulham	1
DF	Lloyd Kelly	Bournemouth	1
DF	Tim Ream	Fulham	1
MF	Philip Billing	Bournemouth	1
MF	Fábio Carvalho	Fulham	1
MF	Harry Wilson	Fulham	1
FW	Ben Brereton Díaz	Blackburn Rovers	1
FW	Dominic Solanke	Bournemouth	1
FW	Aleksandar Mitrović ‡	Fulham	2

==== League One ====
Pos.	Player	Club	App.
GK	Gavin Bazunu	Portsmouth	1
DF	Harry Darling	Milton Keynes Dons	1
DF	Jack Whatmough	Wigan Athletic	1
DF	Michael Ihiekwe *	Rotherham United	2
DF	Ricardo Santos	Bolton Wanderers	2
MF	Barry Bannan	Sheffield Wednesday	2
MF	Scott Twine	Milton Keynes Dons	1
MF	Cameron Brannagan *	Oxford United	2
FW	Cole Stockton	Morecambe	1
FW	Ross Stewart	Sunderland	1
FW	Will Keane	Wigan Athletic	1

==== League Two ====
Pos.	Player	Club	App.
GK	Liam Roberts	Northampton Town	1
DF	Kane Wilson	Forest Green Rovers	1
DF	Fraser Horsfall	Northampton Town	1
DF	Peter Clarke	Tranmere Rovers	1
DF	Jon Guthrie	Northampton Town	1
MF	Matt Jay ¤	Exeter City	2
MF	Ebou Adams	Forest Green Rovers	1
MF	Nicky Cadden	Forest Green Rovers	1
FW	Jamille Matt	Forest Green Rovers	1
FW	Matty Stevens	Forest Green Rovers	1
FW	Dom Telford	Newport County	1

==== FA WSL ====
Pos.	Player	Club	App.
GK	Ann-Katrin Berger †	Chelsea	4
DF	Ona Batlle	Manchester United	1
DF	Millie Bright †	Chelsea	3
DF	Leah Williamson †	Arsenal	3
DF	Alex Greenwood †	Manchester City	2
MF	Guro Reiten	Chelsea	1
MF	Caroline Weir †	Manchester City	4
MF	Kim Little †	Arsenal	3
FW	Vivianne Miedema †	Arsenal	3
FW	Sam Kerr †	Chelsea	2
FW	Lauren Hemp †	Manchester City	2

=== 2022–23 ===
==== Premier League ====
Pos.	Player	Club	App.
GK	Aaron Ramsdale	Arsenal	1
DF	William Saliba	Arsenal	1
DF	Rúben Dias †	Manchester City	2
DF	John Stones †	Manchester City	2
DF	Kieran Trippier	Newcastle United	1
MF	Martin Ødegaard	Arsenal	1
MF	Rodri	Manchester City	1
MF	Kevin De Bruyne †	Manchester City	5
FW	Harry Kane †	Tottenham Hotspur	6
FW	Erling Haaland	Manchester City	1
FW	Bukayo Saka	Arsenal	1

==== Championship ====
Pos.	Player	Club	App.
GK	Arijanet Muric	Burnley	1
DF	Tom Lockyer	Luton Town	1
DF	Connor Roberts	Burnley	1
DF	Anel Ahmedhodžić	Sheffield United	1
DF	Ian Maatsen	Burnley	1
MF	Iliman Ndiaye	Sheffield United	1
MF	Nathan Tella	Burnley	1
MF	Josh Brownhill	Burnley	1
FW	Carlton Morris	Luton Town	1
FW	Viktor Gyökeres	Coventry City	1
FW	Chuba Akpom	Middlesbrough	1

==== League One ====
Pos.	Player	Club	App.
GK	James Trafford	Bolton Wanderers	1
DF	Mads Juel Andersen	Barnsley	1
DF	Ricardo Santos *	Bolton Wanderers	3
DF	Bali Mumba	Plymouth Argyle	1
DF	Leif Davis	Ipswich Town	1
MF	Luca Connell	Barnsley	1
MF	Sam Morsy	Ipswich Town	1
MF	Barry Bannan *	Sheffield Wednesday	2
FW	David McGoldrick	Derby County	1
FW	Jonson Clarke-Harris *	Peterborough United	2
FW	Conor Chaplin	Ipswich Town	1

==== League Two ====
Pos.	Player	Club	App.
GK	Lawrence Vigouroux	Leyton Orient	1
DF	Ibou Touray	Salford City	1
DF	Junior Tchamadeu	Colchester United	1
DF	Omar Beckles	Leyton Orient	1
DF	Carl Piergianni	Stevenage	1
MF	Idris El Mizouni	Leyton Orient	1
MF	Elliot Watt	Salford City	1
MF	Owen Moxon	Carlisle United	1
FW	Paul Smyth	Leyton Orient	1
FW	Sam Hoskins	Northampton Town	1
FW	Andy Cook	Bradford City	1

==== Women's Super League ====
Pos.	Player	Club	App.
GK	Mary Earps	Manchester United	1
DF	Rafaelle Souza	Arsenal	1
DF	Alex Greenwood †	Manchester City	3
DF	Maya Le Tissier	Manchester United	1
DF	Ona Batlle †	Manchester United	2
MF	Yui Hasegawa	Manchester City	1
MF	Guro Reiten †	Chelsea	2
MF	Frida Maanum	Arsenal	1
FW	Sam Kerr †	Chelsea	3
FW	Khadija Shaw	Manchester City	1
FW	Rachel Daly	Aston Villa	1

=== 2023–24 ===
==== Premier League ====
Pos.	Player	Club	App.
GK	David Raya	Arsenal	1
DF	Kyle Walker †	Manchester City	4
DF	Gabriel	Arsenal	1
DF	Virgil van Dijk †	Liverpool	4
DF	William Saliba †	Arsenal	2
MF	Martin Ødegaard †	Arsenal	2
MF	Declan Rice	Arsenal	1
MF	Rodri †	Manchester City	2
FW	Ollie Watkins	Aston Villa	1
FW	Phil Foden	Manchester City	1
FW	Erling Haaland †	Manchester City	2

==== Championship ====
Pos.	Player	Club	App.
GK	Illan Meslier	Leeds United	1
DF	Jannik Vestergaard	Leicester City	1
DF	Ethan Ampadu	Leeds United	1
DF	Kyle Walker-Peters	Southampton	1
DF	Leif Davis	Ipswich Town	1
MF	Archie Gray	Leeds United	1
MF	Gabriel Sara	Norwich City	1
MF	Kiernan Dewsbury-Hall	Leicester City	1
FW	Adam Armstrong ‡	Southampton	3
FW	Sammie Szmodics	Blackburn Rovers	1
FW	Crysencio Summerville	Leeds United	1

==== League One ====
Pos.	Player	Club	App.
GK	Will Norris	Portsmouth	1
DF	Conor Shaughnessy	Portsmouth	1
DF	Ricardo Santos *	Bolton Wanderers	4
DF	Ronnie Edwards	Peterborough United	1
DF	Eiran Cashin	Derby County	1
MF	Cameron Brannagan *	Oxford United	3
MF	Josh Sheehan	Bolton Wanderers	2
MF	Marlon Pack	Portsmouth	1
FW	Ephron Mason-Clark	Peterborough United	1
FW	Colby Bishop	Portsmouth	1
FW	Alfie May	Charlton Athletic	1

==== League Two ====
Pos.	Player	Club	App.
GK	Ben Hinchliffe	Stockport County	1
DF	Aden Flint	Mansfield Town	1
DF	Fraser Horsfall ¤	Stockport County	2
DF	Mickey Demetriou	Crewe Alexandra	1
DF	Ibou Touray ¤	Stockport County	2
MF	Elliot Lee	Wrexham	1
MF	Davis Keillor-Dunn	Mansfield Town	1
MF	Daniel Crowley	Notts County	1
FW	Macaulay Langstaff	Notts County	1
FW	Jodi Jones	Notts County	1
FW	Paul Mullin ¤	Wrexham	2

==== Women's Super League ====
Pos.	Player	Club	App.
GK	Khiara Keating	Manchester City	1
DF	Alex Greenwood †	Manchester City	4
DF	Niamh Charles	Chelsea	1
DF	Laia Aleixandri	Manchester City	1
DF	Lotte Wubben-Moy	Arsenal	1
MF	Yui Hasegawa †	Manchester City	2
MF	Erin Cuthbert †	Chelsea	2
MF	Grace Clinton	Tottenham Hotspur	1
FW	Khadija Shaw †	Manchester City	2
FW	Lauren James	Chelsea	1
FW	Lauren Hemp †	Manchester City	3

=== 2024–25 ===
==== Premier League ====
Pos.	Player	Club	App.
GK	Matz Sels	Nottingham Forest	1
DF	William Saliba †	Arsenal	3
DF	Gabriel †	Arsenal	2
DF	Virgil van Dijk †	Liverpool	5
DF	Milos Kerkez	Bournemouth	1
MF	Alexis Mac Allister	Liverpool	1
MF	Ryan Gravenberch	Liverpool	1
MF	Declan Rice †	Arsenal	2
FW	Mohamed Salah †	Liverpool	4
FW	Alexander Isak	Newcastle United	1
FW	Chris Wood	Nottingham Forest	2

==== Championship ====
Pos.	Player	Club	App.
GK	James Trafford	Burnley	2
DF	CJ Egan-Riley	Burnley	1
DF	Maxime Estève	Burnley	1
DF	Junior Firpo	Leeds United	1
DF	Jayden Bogle	Leeds United	1
MF	Ao Tanaka	Leeds United	1
MF	Josh Brownhill ‡	Burnley	2
MF	Gustavo Hamer	Sheffield United	1
FW	Borja Sainz	Norwich City	1
FW	Joël Piroe	Leeds United	1
FW	Daniel James	Leeds United	1

==== League One ====
Pos.	Player	Club	App.
GK	Ryan Allsop	Birmingham City	1
DF	Alex Cochrane	Birmingham City	1
DF	Lloyd Jones	Charlton Athletic	1
DF	Christoph Klarer	Birmingham City	1
DF	Ethan Laird	Birmingham City	1
MF	Paik Seung-ho	Birmingham City	1
MF	Kwame Poku	Peterborough United	1
MF	Tomoki Iwata	Birmingham City	1
FW	Charlie Kelman	Leyton Orient	1
FW	Richard Kone	Wycombe Wanderers	1
FW	Jay Stansfield	Birmingham City	1

==== League Two ====
Pos.	Player	Club	App.
GK	Owen Goodman	AFC Wimbledon	1
DF	Brad Halliday	Bradford City	1
DF	George Abbott	Notts County	1
DF	Mickey Demetriou ¤	Crewe Alexandra	2
DF	Denver Hume	Grimsby Town	1
MF	Jack Payne	Colchester United	1
MF	Taylor Allen	Walsall	1
MF	David McGoldrick	Notts County	2
FW	Luke Molyneux	Doncaster Rovers	1
FW	Michael Cheek	Bromley	1
FW	Alassana Jatta	Notts County	1

==== Women's Super League ====
Pos.	Player	Club	App.
GK	Phallon Tullis-Joyce	Manchester United	1
DF	Emily Fox	Arsenal	1
DF	Maya Le Tissier †	Manchester United	2
DF	Millie Bright †	Chelsea	4
DF	Jayde Riviere	Manchester United	1
MF	Yui Hasegawa †	Manchester City	3
MF	Erin Cuthbert †	Chelsea	3
MF	Kim Little †	Arsenal	4
FW	Mariona Caldentey	Arsenal	1
FW	Alessia Russo	Arsenal	1
FW	Mary Fowler	Manchester City	1

=== 2025–26 ===
==== Premier League ====
Pos.	Player	Club	App.
GK	David Raya †	Arsenal	2
DF	William Saliba †	Arsenal	4
DF	Gabriel †	Arsenal	3
DF	Jurriën Timber	Arsenal	1
DF	Nico O'Reilly	Manchester City	1
MF	Bruno Fernandes †	Manchester United	2
MF	Rayan Cherki	Manchester City	1
MF	Declan Rice †	Arsenal	3
FW	Erling Haaland †	Manchester City	3
FW	Antoine Semenyo	Bournemouth/Manchester City	1
FW	Igor Thiago	Brentford	1

==== Championship ====
Pos.	Player	Club	App.
GK	Carl Rushworth	Coventry City	1
DF	Milan van Ewijk	Coventry City	1
DF	Bobby Thomas	Coventry City	1
DF	Tristan Crama	Millwall	1
DF	Taylor Harwood-Bellis	Southampton	1
MF	Hayden Hackney	Middlesbrough	1
MF	Matt Grimes	Coventry City	2
MF	Jack Rudoni	Coventry City	1
FW	Žan Vipotnik	Swansea City	1
FW	Haji Wright	Coventry City	1
FW	Femi Azeez	Millwall	1

==== League One ====
Pos.	Player	Club	App.
GK	George Wickens	Lincoln City	1
DF	Sonny Bradley	Lincoln City	2
DF	Tendayi Darikwa	Lincoln City	1
DF	Perry Ng	Cardiff City	2
DF	Carl Piergianni	Stevenage	2
MF	Oliver Norwood	Stockport County	2
MF	Lewis Wing	Reading	1
MF	Jack Moylan	Lincoln City	1
FW	Dom Ballard	Leyton Orient	1
FW	Kyle Wootton	Stockport County	1
FW	Amario Cozier-Duberry	Bolton Wanderers	1

==== League Two ====
Pos.	Player	Club	App.
GK	Mathew Hudson	Oldham Athletic	1
DF	Omar Sowunmi	Bromley	1
DF	Kelland Watts	Cambridge United	1
DF	Jack Sanders	Milton Keynes Dons	1
DF	James Gibbons	Cambridge United	1
MF	Alex Gilbey	Milton Keynes Dons	1
MF	Mitch Pinnock	Bromley	1
MF	Sammy Braybrooke	Chesterfield	1
FW	Aaron Drinan	Swindon Town	1
FW	Michael Cheek ¤	Bromley	2
FW	Callum Paterson	Milton Keynes Dons	1

==== Women's Super League ====
Pos.	Player	Club	App.
GK	Hannah Hampton	Chelsea	1
DF	Kerstin Casparij	Manchester City	1
DF	Tōko Koga	Tottenham Hotspur	1
DF	Ellie Carpenter	Chelsea	1
DF	Emily Fox †	Arsenal	2
MF	Yui Hasegawa †	Manchester City	4
MF	Mariona Caldentey †	Arsenal	2
MF	Jess Park	Manchester United	1
FW	Khadija Shaw †	Manchester City	3
FW	Alessia Russo †	Arsenal	2
FW	Lauren James †	Chelsea	2

==== Women's Super League 2 ====
Pos.	Player	Club	App.
GK	Sophie Whitehouse	Charlton Athletic	1
DF	Aimee Everett	Crystal Palace	1
DF	Neve Herron	Birmingham City	1
DF	Rebecca McKenna	Birmingham City	1
DF	Mari Ward	Bristol City	1
MF	Emily Syme	Bristol City	1
MF	Jordan Nobbs	Newcastle United	3
MF	Annabel Blanchard	Crystal Palace	1
FW	Lily Crosthwaite	Birmingham City	1
FW	Ashleigh Weerden	Crystal Palace	1
FW	Emily Murphy	Newcastle United	1

== See also ==
- PFA Team of the Year (1970s)
- PFA Team of the Year (1980s)
- PFA Team of the Year (1990s)
- PFA Team of the Year (2000s)
- PFA Team of the Year (2010s)
