= 2024–25 Birmingham City F.C. season =

Birmingham City
2024–25 season
- Owners: Birmingham Sports Holdings 51.7%; Shelby Companies 45.96%; Others 2.34%
- Chairman: Tom Wagner
- Manager: Chris Davies
- Stadium: St Andrew's
- League One: 1st
- FA Cup: Fourth round (eliminated by Newcastle United)
- EFL Cup: Second round (eliminated by Fulham)
- EFL Trophy: Runners-up (eliminated by Peterborough United)
- Top goalscorer: League: Jay Stansfield (19); All: Jay Stansfield (23)
- Highest home attendance: 27,994 (vs Newcastle United, FA Cup 8 February 2025)
- Lowest home attendance: 6,900 (vs Fulham U21, EFL Trophy 29 October 2024)
- Average home league attendance: 26,283
Home colours	Away colours

The 2024–25 season was Birmingham City Football Club's 122nd season in the English football league system and first season in the third-tier EFL League One since 1994–95. They finished in 22nd place in the 2023–24 EFL Championship, and were relegated after 13 years at that level. The team confirmed promotion back to the Championship with six League One matches still to play, and Wrexham's failure to beat Wigan Athletic a few days later confirmed them as champions. It was Birmingham's first league title since winning the old Second Division in 1994–95. As with all third- and fourth-tier League clubs, the first team compete in the FA Cup, the EFL Cup and the EFL Trophy.

The season covered the period from 1 July 2024 to 30 June 2025.

== Background and pre-season ==
=== Off the field ===
In July 2023, Shelby Companies Ltd, a subsidiary of asset management company Knighthead Capital Management fronted by Tom Wagner, Knighthead's co-founder and co-CEO, completed the purchase of 45.64% of Birmingham City plc shares and the whole of Birmingham City Stadium Ltd. Although previous owners Birmingham Sports Holdings (BSH) retained 51% of the shares, Wagner confirmed that Shelby were "responsible for the operations of the club moving forward" and that "nothing about the way the transaction is structured will prevent us from obtaining the long-term goals we have for the club." Former Manchester City executive Garry Cook was appointed CEO, and considerable media attention followed the arrival of American football player and seven-time Super Bowl winner Tom Brady as minority owner and chair of the club's advisory board.

Works begun during the 2022–23 season to demolish and rebuild the lower tiers of the Kop and Tilton Road stands, closed since late 2020 because of what was initially described as water damage to structural steelwork and eventually revealed to be asbestos-related, and interrupted when the main contractors filed for administration finally completed in November 2023 under the management of Mace Consult. The rebuild included conversion of the lower Tilton to safe standing. In January 2024, the club's owners, Shelby Companies, renamed the stadium St. Andrew's @ Knighthead Park as part of what it described as "the largest commercial agreement in the club's history". According to Wagner, chairman of both club and Knighthead, it was "step one in our plan to create a world-renowned 'Sports Quarter' in Birmingham. We invested in Blues because of the opportunity to not only transform a football club but to also be a catalyst for change in the city itself." By the start of the 2024–25 season, the club intended to construct two fan parks outside the ground as well as refurbish hospitality areas within the stadium and make the public address system work.

Benefiting from the upgrade to the club's agreement with kit suppliers Nike during the 2023–24 season to include bespoke rather than off-the-shelf product, the 2024–25 home kit consists of a royal blue shirt with white trim at collar and cuffs, white sides, and – with echoes of the Co-op Milk shirt of the 1980s – a white strip across the front carrying the logo of the club's principal partner, streetwear company Undefeated, white shorts and royal blue socks.

=== On the field ===
On-field matters ran less smoothly, resulting in Birmingham City beginning the 2024–25 season in the third tier of English football for the first time since 1994–95.

On 6 June, after "close to 1,000 coaches being evaluated and more than 40 being spoken to directly or through their representatives", Chris Davies, senior assistant coach under Ange Postecoglou at Tottenham Hotspur, was appointed manager on a four-year contract. It would be his first senior managerial role.

=== Transfers ===
Among out-of-contract players, departures included the long-serving Neil Etheridge, Gary Gardner, Scott Hogan, Marc Roberts and Ivan Sunjic, as well as young professionals Marcel Oakley and Tate Campbell. New contracts were offered to Lukas Jutkiewicz and John Ruddy – Jutkiewicz accepted, Ruddy did not – and the option on Keshi Anderson's contract was taken up. The return of loanee Jay Stansfield, 2023–24 Player of the Year and top scorer, to his parent club left Birmingham particularly short of strikers.

The first contracted player to leave was midfielder Alex Pritchard, who joined Turkish Süper Lig club Sivasspor for an undisclosed fee.

The first new signings were goalkeepers Ryan Allsop from Hull City and Northern Ireland international Bailey Peacock-Farrell from Burnley, followed by 2023–24 League One top scorer Alfie May from divisional rivals Charlton Athletic.

=== Pre-season ===
After a week's training in Austria, to include a friendly against German second-tier team Paderborn 07, the team would take part in the third edition of the Arthur Cup, a match against Solihull Moors in aid of children's charities in memory of Arthur Labinjo-Hughes. The club's programme continued with three friendlies against local opposition – away to Walsall and Shrewsbury Town and at home to West Bromwich Albion – and a match to mark the first anniversary of the death of Birmingham City legend Trevor Francis, at home to another of his former clubs, Rangers.

Pre-season friendly match details
Date	Opponents	Venue	Result	Score F–A	Scorers	Ref.
13 July 2024	Paderborn 07	N	L	0–5		
17 July 2024	Solihull Moors	A	W	3–0	May 12', Miyoshi 51', Jutkiewicz 63'	
20 July 2024	Shrewsbury Town	A	W	2–0	James 20', Jutkiewicz 84'	
24 July 2024	Rangers	H	W	2–1	Tavernier 10' o.g., May 36'	
27 July 2024	Walsall	A	W	1–0	May 60'	
3 August 2024	West Bromwich Albion	H	W	4–1	May (2) 20', 82', Klarer 72', Willumsson 80'	

== EFL League One ==
Birmingham began their league campaign at home to Reading on 10 August 2024.

=== League table ===
Pos	Team	Pld	W	D	L	GF	GA	GD	Pts	Promotion, qualification or relegation
1	Birmingham City (C, P)	46	34	9	3	84	31	+53	111	Promotion to EFL Championship
2	Wrexham (P)	46	27	11	8	67	34	+33	92	Promotion to EFL Championship
3	Stockport County	46	25	12	9	72	42	+30	87	Qualification for League One play-offs
4	Charlton Athletic (O, P)	46	25	10	11	67	43	+24	85	Qualification for League One play-offs
5	Wycombe Wanderers	46	24	12	10	70	45	+25	84	Qualification for League One play-offs

Source: EFL Official Website
Rules for classification: 1) Points; 2) Goal difference; 3) Number of goals scored; 4) Head-to-head results; 5) Wins; 6) Away goals; 7) Penalty points (sec 9.5); 8) 12-point sending off offences
(C) Champions; (O) Play-off winners; (P) Promoted

=== Results summary ===
Overall								Home						Away					
Pld	W	D	L	GF	GA	GD	Pts	W	D	L	GF	GA	GD	W	D	L	GF	GA	GD
46	34	9	3	84	31	+53	111	19	4	0	47	11	+36	15	5	3	37	20	+17

=== Match results ===
EFL League One match details
Date	League position	Opponents	Venue	Result	Score F–A	Scorers	Attendance	Refs
10 August 2024	13th	Reading	H	D	1–1	May 87' (pen.)	27,985	
17 August 2024	7th	Wycombe Wanderers	A	W	3–2	May 31', Harris 68', Willumsson 82'	6,224	
24 August 2024	5th	Leyton Orient	A	W	2–1	Anderson 7', May 20'	8,005	
31 August 2024	3rd	Wigan Athletic	H	W	2–1	May 18', Wright 90+1'	26,136	
16 September 2024	2nd	Wrexham	H	W	3–1	Stansfield 22', 52', Iwata 59'	27,980	
21 September 2024	2nd	Rotherham United	A	W	2–0	Iwata 14', Stansfield 22'	10,335	
28 September 2024	1st	Peterborough United	H	W	3–2	Willumsson 24', Wallin 49' o.g., Bielik 66'	27,206	
1 October 2024	1st	Huddersfield Town	H	W	1–0	May 63'	24,757	
5 October 2024	1st	Charlton Athletic	A	L	0–1		16,250	
19 October 2024	1st	Lincoln City	A	W	3–1	Anderson 14', 79', Willumsson 52'	10,026	
22 October 2024	1st	Bolton Wanderers	H	W	2–0	Iwata 3', Stansfield 86' pen.	25,793	
26 October 2024	1st	Mansfield Town	A	D	1–1	Willumsson 10'	8,583	
9 November 2024	2nd	Northampton Town	H	D	1–1	Stansfield 58'	27,485	
23 November 2024	4th	Shrewsbury Town	A	L	2–3	Iwata 44', Stansfield 76' pen.	7,887	
26 November 2024	3rd	Exeter City	A	W	2–0	Iwata 11', Stansfield 83' pen.	7,928	
4 December 2024	3rd	Stockport County	H	W	2–0	May 26', 35'	24,863	
7 December 2024	3rd	Barnsley	A	W	2–1	Stansfield 60', 79'	15,367	
14 December 2024	2nd	Bristol Rovers	H	W	2–0	Buchanan 6', Stansfield 38' pen.	26,459	
23 December 2024	1st	Crawley Town	A	W	1–0	Stansfield 79'	5,530	
26 December 2024	1st	Burton Albion	H	W	2–0	Stansfield 26' pen., Crocombe 56' o.g.	27,524	
29 December 2024	1st	Blackpool	H	D	0–0		27,340	
1 January 2025	2nd	Stockport County	A	D	1–1	May 5'	10,528	
4 January 2025	1st	Wigan Athletic	A	W	3–0	May 18', 30', Willumsson 61'	13,485	
18 January 2025	1st	Exeter City	H	W	1–0	Laird 45+2'	25,930	
23 January 2025	1st	Wrexham	A	D	1–1	Dykes 18'	13,237	
28 January 2025	1st	Huddersfield Town	A	W	1–0	Anderson 49'	19,138	
1 February 2025	1st	Rotherham United	H	W	2–1	Stansfield 54', 81' pen.	24,393	
11 February 2025	1st	Cambridge United	H	W	4–0	Stansfield 23' pen., Bennett 39' o.g., Dowell 40', Harris 79'	22,456	
15 February 2025	1st	Charlton Athletic	H	W	1–0	Stansfield 23'	25,542	
22 February 2025	1st	Reading	A	D	0–0		13,919	
25 February 2025	1st	Leyton Orient	H	W	2–0	Gardner-Hickman 53', Laird 84'	26,857	
1 March 2025	1st	Wycombe Wanderers	H	W	1–0	Gardner-Hickman 21'	27,522	
4 March 2025	1st	Bolton Wanderers	A	L	1–3	Hansson 23'	23,023	
8 March 2025	1st	Lincoln City	H	W	1–0	Dowell 71' pen.	26,210	
11 March 2025	1st	Stevenage	H	W	2–1	Dowell 27' pen., Paik 47'	25,544	
15 March 2025	1st	Northampton Town	A	D	1–1	Anderson 45+2'	7,947	
29 March 2025	1st	Shrewsbury Town	H	W	4–1	Davies 27', Laird 61', May 77', 86'	26,254	
1 April 2025	1st	Bristol Rovers	A	W	2–1	Anderson 3', Stansfield 85' pen.	8,088	
5 April 2025	1st	Barnsley	H	W	6–2	Stansfield 33' pen., May 47', (Note: Birmingham City F.C. gives the second goal to Ben Davies, but most other sources, including the EFL website, give it to May. This article follows the EFL.) 55', Harris 72', Dowell 82', Jutkiewicz 89'	25,018	
8 April 2025	1st	Peterborough United	A	W	2–1	May 19', Gardner-Hickman 37'	10,640	
18 April 2025	1st	Crawley Town	H	D	0–0		27,325	
21 April 2025	1st	Burton Albion	A	W	2–1	Sampsted 44', Stansfield 45+2'	4,928	
24 April 2025	1st	Stevenage	A	W	1–0	Cochrane 75'	4,135	
27 April 2025	1st	Mansfield Town	H	W	4–0	Anderson 24', Willumsson 39', Dowell 50', Iwata 57'	27,920	
30 April 2025	1st	Blackpool	A	W	2–0	Laird 39', May 51'	9,618	
3 May 2025	1st	Cambridge United	A	W	2–1	Klarer 25', Watts 82' o.g.	6,764	

== FA Cup ==
As with all teams in the lower two divisions of the Football League, Birmingham entered the competition in the first round, in which they were drawn to play away to National League (fifth-tier) club Sutton United. Willumsson scored during the first half and Sutton failed to take chances to equalise. In the second round, Birmingham travelled to League One rivals Blackpool, managed by Steve Bruce, who had twice led Birmingham into the Premier League in the early 2000s. Davies made ten changes from the team that won at Exeter City five days before, starting Lyndon Dykes and Lukas Jutkiewicz up front and retaining only Krystian Bielik as captain. Both strikers scored within the first half hour, Jordan Rhodes made it 2–1 early in the second half but Birmingham brought on three regular first-teamers to strengthen the side.

FA Cup match details
Round	Date	Opponents	Venue	Result	Score F–A	Scorers	Attendance	Refs
First round	3 November 2024	Sutton United	A	W	1–0	Willumsson 34'	4,804	
Second round	1 December 2024	Blackpool	A	W	2–1	Dykes 6', Jutkiewicz 24'	4,835	
Third round	11 January 2025	Lincoln City	H	W	2–1	Yokoyama 1', Dykes 77'	17,032	
Fourth round	8 February 2025	Newcastle United	H	L	2–3	Laird 1', Iwata 40'	27,994	

== EFL Cup ==
Birmingham were drawn to play away to League One rivals Charlton Athletic in the first round. In the second round, they lost 2–0 at home to Fulham.

EFL Cup match details
Round	Date	Opponents	Venue	Result	Score F–A	Scorers	Attendance	Refs
First round	13 August 2024	Charlton Athletic	A	W	1–0	Khela 32'	5,899	
Second round	27 August 2024	Fulham	H	L	0–2		11,949	

== EFL Trophy ==
When Birmingham last took part in this competition, then named the Football League Trophy, in the 1994–95 season, they beat Carlisle United in the final via Paul Tait's golden goal. In the group stage, Birmingham were drawn into Southern Group A alongside Shrewsbury Town, Walsall and Fulham U21. A "losing draw" against Walsall and two wins gave Birmingham second place in the group and qualification for the knockout stages.

Birmingham made eight changes from the previous starting eleven for the visit to Exeter City in the round of 32; full-back Lee Buchanan made his first appearance of the season after five months out with injury. Luke Harris took advantage of a short back-pass to give the visitors a 22nd-minute lead, only for Exeter to equalise ten minutes later direct from a corner. In the second half, Ben Davies blocked Jay Bird's shot on the goal-line and Ryan Allsop saved from the rebound, and Keshi Anderson had a goal disallowed for offside before Anderson scored the winning goal from Ayumu Yokoyama's through ball.

They were drawn away to Swindon Town in the round of 16.

Pos	Div	Team	Pld	W	PW	PL	L	GF	GA	GD	Pts	Qualification
1	L2	Walsall	3	2	1	0	0	5	1	+4	8	Advance to Round 2
2	L1	Birmingham City	3	2	0	1	0	12	2	+10	7	Advance to Round 2
3	ACA	Fulham U21	3	1	0	0	2	3	9	−6	3	
4	L1	Shrewsbury Town	3	0	0	0	3	1	9	−8	0	

Source: EFL

EFL Trophy match details
Round	Date	Opponents	Venue	Result	Score F–A	Scorers	Attendance	Refs
Group stage	3 September 2024	Walsall	H	D	1–1 (3–4 pens.)	Klarer 84'	9,752	
Group stage	8 October 2024	Shrewsbury Town	A	W	4–0	Wright 8', 38', Iwata 29', Hansson 71'	4,847	
Group stage	29 October 2024	Fulham U21	H	W	7–1	Stansfield 17', 43', Yokoyama 54', 74', May 59', Anderson 90+4', Dykes 90+6'	6,900	
Round of 32	10 December 2024	Exeter City	A	W	2–1	Harris 22', Anderson 78'	1,986	
Round of 16	14 January 2025	Swindon Town	A	W	2–1	Yokoyama 49', Smith 89' (o.g.)	3,509	
Quarter-final	4 February 2025	Stevenage	A	W	1–0	Stansfield 83'	2,812	
Semi-final	18 February 2025	Bradford City	H	W	2–1	Stansfield 45+3', Dykes 88'	27,066	
Final	13 April 2025	Peterborough United	N	L	0–2		71,722	

== Transfers ==
For those players sold, released, or whose contract ended before the start of this season, see 2023–24 Birmingham City F.C. season.

=== In ===
Date	Player	Club †	Fee	Refs
18 June 2024	(England) Ryan Allsop	(England) Hull City	Undisclosed	
30 June 2024	(Northern Ireland) Bailey Peacock-Farrell	(England) Burnley	Undisclosed	
2 July 2024	(England) Alfie May	(England) Charlton Athletic	Undisclosed	
5 July 2024	(Sweden) Emil Hansson	(Netherlands) Heracles Almelo	Undisclosed	
16 July 2024	(England) Alex Cochrane	(Scotland) Heart of Midlothian	Undisclosed	
19 July 2024	(Iceland) Willum Þór Willumsson	(Netherlands) Go Ahead Eagles	Undisclosed	
20 July 2024	(Austria) Christoph Klarer	(Germany) Darmstadt 98	Undisclosed	
25 July 2024	(Scotland) Marc Leonard	(England) Brighton & Hove Albion	Undisclosed	
10 August 2024	(Japan) Ayumu Yokoyama	(Japan) Sagan Tosu	Undisclosed	
27 August 2024	(England) Cody Pennington *	(England) (Liverpool)	Free	
28 August 2024	(Scotland) Lyndon Dykes	(England) Queens Park Rangers	Undisclosed	
30 August 2024	(Scotland) Scott Wright	(Scotland) Rangers	Undisclosed	
30 August 2024	(Japan) Tomoki Iwata	(Scotland) Celtic	Undisclosed	
30 August 2024	(England) Jay Stansfield	(England) Fulham	Undisclosed	
17 January 2025	(Scotland) Grant Hanley	(England) Norwich City	Free	
3 February 2025	(South Korea) Lee Myung-jae	(South Korea) (Ulsan HD)	Free	
4 February 2025	(England) Kurtis Havenhand *	(England) (Sheffield United)	Free	

† Brackets round a club's name indicate the player's contract with that club had expired before he joined Birmingham.
* Signed primarily for the development squad

==== Loaned in ====
Date	Player	Club	Return	Refs
4 August 2024	(Wales) Luke Harris	(England) Fulham	End of season	
12 August 2024	(Iceland) Alfons Sampsted	(Netherlands) Twente	End of season	
23 August 2024	(England) Taylor Gardner-Hickman	(England) Bristol City	End of season	
25 August 2024	(England) Ben Davies	(Scotland) Rangers	End of season	
27 January 2025	(England) Kieran Dowell	(Scotland) Rangers	End of season	

=== Out ===
Date	Player	Club †	Fee	Refs
1 July 2024	Alex Pritchard	Sivasspor	Undisclosed	
12 August 2024	Jordan James	Rennes	Undisclosed	
28 August 2024	Juninho Bacuna	Al-Wehda	Undisclosed	
29 August 2024	Siriki Dembélé	Oxford United	Undisclosed	
30 August 2024	Kōji Miyoshi	VfL Bochum	Undisclosed	
21 January 2025	Josh Williams	Carlisle United	Undisclosed	
30 June 2025	Ben Beresford		Released	
30 June 2025	Junior Dixon		Released	
30 June 2025	Taylor Dodd		Released	
30 June 2025	Laiith Fairnie		Released	
30 June 2025	Harley Hamilton		Released	
30 June 2025	Grant Hanley		Released	
30 June 2025	Josh Home		Released	
30 June 2025	Lukas Jutkiewicz		Retired	
30 June 2025	Sahid Kamara		Released	
30 June 2025	Lee Myung-Jae		Released	
30 June 2025	Femi Olofinjana		Released	
30 June 2025	Stoyan Pergelov		Released	
30 June 2025	Oliver Sayer		Released	

† Brackets round a club's name denote the player joined that club after his Birmingham City contract expired.

==== Loaned out ====
Date	Player	Club	Return	Refs
1 August 2024	Junior Dixon	Boreham Wood	End of season	
9 August 2024	Ben Beresford	Kidderminster Harriers	End of season	
22 August 2024	Manny Longelo	Cambridge United	End of season	
25 August 2024	Tommy Fogarty	Dunfermline Athletic	End of season	
30 August 2024	Romelle Donovan	Burton Albion	End of season, recalled 6 December 2024	
30 August 2024	George Hall	Walsall	End of season	
30 August 2024	Tyler Roberts	Northampton Town	End of season	
6 September 2024	Laiith Fairnie	Rushall Olympic	End of season	
18 September 2024	Josh Home	Gateshead	End of season, recalled 6 January 2025	
8 November 2024	Femi Olofinjana	Redditch United	1 January 2025	
12 November 2024	Josh Williams	Gateshead	January 2025	
7 December 2024	Olly Sayer	Stafford Rangers	5 January 2025	
3 January 2025	Brandon Khela	Bradford City	End of season	
4 January 2025	O'Shea Ellis	Stourbridge	31 January 2025	
6 January 2025	Sahid Kamara	Welling United	31 January 2025	
10 January 2025	Dion Sanderson	Blackburn Rovers	End of season	
10 January 2025	Ben Wodskou	Rushall Olympic	7 February 2025	
3 February 2025	Alfie Chang	Walsall	End of season	
3 February 2025	Romelle Donovan	Brentford	End of season	
3 February 2025	Ayumu Yokoyama	Jong Genk	End of season	
28 February 2025	Taylor Dodd	Alvechurch	End of season	

== Appearances and goals ==
Numbers in parentheses denote appearances made as a substitute.
Players marked † left the club during the playing season.
Players with names in italics and marked * were on loan from another club for the whole of their season with Birmingham.
Players listed with no appearances have been in the matchday squad but only as unused substitutes.
Key to positions: GK – Goalkeeper; DF – Defender; MF – Midfielder; FW – Forward

Players' appearances and goals by competition
No.	Pos.	Nat.	Name	League		FA Cup		EFL Cup		EFL Trophy		Total		Discipline	
No.	Pos.	Nat.	Name	Apps	Goals	Apps	Goals	Apps	Goals	Apps	Goals	Apps	Goals	A yellow rectangle, denoting the yellow penalty card shown to a player being cautioned	A red rectangle, denoting the red penalty card shown to a player being sent off
2	DF	ENG	Ethan Laird	27 (8)	4	3 (1)	1	2	0	3 (3)	0	35 (12)	5	6	0
3	DF	ENG	Lee Buchanan	3	1	0	0	0	0	1	0	4	1	1	0
4	DF	AUT	Christoph Klarer	43	1	3	0	2	0	5 (1)	1	53 (1)	2	13	0
5	DF	ENG	Dion Sanderson	1 (1)	0	1	0	1	0	3	0	6 (1)	0	2	1
6	MF	POL	Krystian Bielik	20 (12)	1	1 (1)	0	1 (1)	0	1 (2)	0	23 (16)	1	4	1
7	FW	SWE	Emil Hansson	12 (8)	1	0	0	2	0	0 (2)	1	14 (10)	2	0	0
8	FW	WAL	Tyler Roberts	0	0	0	0	1 (1)	0	0	0	1 (1)	0	0	0
9	FW	ENG	Alfie May	27 (17)	16	0 (3)	0	1 (1)	0	5 (3)	1	33 (24)	17	5	0
10	FW	ENG	Lukas Jutkiewicz	0 (16)	1	2 (1)	1	1 (1)	0	2 (4)	0	5 (22)	2	2	0
11	MF	JPN	Koji Miyoshi †	1 (2)	0	0	0	0 (1)	0	0	0	1 (3)	0	0	0
11	MF	SCO	Scott Wright	3 (10)	1	2	0	0	0	4 (1)	2	9 (11)	3	1	0
12	MF	SCO	Marc Leonard	14 (21)	0	3	0	2	0	6 (1)	0	25 (22)	0	3	0
13	MF	KOR	Paik Seung-ho	36 (5)	1	1 (2)	0	1 (1)	0	2 (2)	0	40 (10)	1	1	0
14	FW	ENG	Keshi Anderson	27 (10)	7	2 (1)	0	2	0	3 (3)	2	34 (14)	9	9	0
15	MF	ENG	Alfie Chang	0	0	0 (1)	0	0	0	0	0	0 (1)	0	0	0
16	DF	KOR	Lee Myung-jae	2 (1)	0	0	0	0	0	0	0	2 (1)	0	0	0
17	FW	SCO	Siriki Dembélé †	1	0	0	0	0	0	0	0	1	0	0	0
17	FW	SCO	Lyndon Dykes	9 (16)	1	2 (1)	2	0	0	1 (3)	2	12 (20)	5	3	0
18	MF	ISL	Willum Þór Willumsson	36 (5)	6	1 (2)	1	1	0	3	0	50 (7)	7	1	0
19	MF	ENG	Taylor Gardner-Hickman *	22 (11)	3	2	0	0	0	6 (1)	0	30 (12)	3	7	0
20	DF	ENG	Alex Cochrane	41 (1)	1	3	0	1 (1)	0	6 (1)	0	51 (3)	1	7	0
21	GK	ENG	Ryan Allsop	38	0	1	0	2	0	4	0	45	0	6	0
23	DF	ISL	Alfons Sampsted *	4 (13)	1	1 (1)	0	0 (2)	0	2	0	7 (16)	1	0	0
24	MF	JPN	Tomoki Iwata	38 (2)	6	2	1	0	0	4 (1)	1	44 (3)	8	8	0
25	DF	ENG	Ben Davies *	32 (3)	1	2	0	0	0	6 (1)	0	40 (4)	1	5	0
26	MF	WAL	Luke Harris *	10 (19)	3	3	0	1	0	3	1	17 (19)	4	6	0
27	MF	ENG	Brandon Khela	0 (2)	0	1	0	1	1	1 (1)	0	3 (3)	1	1	0
28	FW	ENG	Jay Stansfield	31 (6)	19	2	0	0	0	4 (1)	4	37 (7)	23	9	0
30	MF	ENG	Kieran Dowell *	17 (2)	5	1	0	0	0	3	0	21 (2)	5	3	0
31	DF	SCO	Grant Hanley	2 (11)	0	0 (1)	0	0	0	1 (1)	0	3 (13)	0	1	0
33	FW	JPN	Ayumu Yokoyama	0 (10)	0	2 (1)	1	0 (1)	0	5	3	7 (12)	4	1	0
35	MF	ENG	George Hall	0	0	0	0	0	0	0	0	0	0	0	0
39	MF	ENG	Byron Pendleton	0	0	0	0	0	0	0	0	0	0	0	0
41	MF	ENG	Cody Pennington	0	0	0	0	0	0	0	0	0	0	0	0
42	DF	ENG	Josh Williams †	0	0	0	0	0	0	0 (1)	0	0 (1)	0	0	0
43	FW	ENG	Zaid Betteka	0	0	0 (1)	0	0	0	0	0	0 (1)	0	0	0
45	GK	NIR	Bailey Peacock-Farrell	8 (1)	0	3	0	0	0	4	0	15 (1)	0	1	0
47	MF	ENG	Josh Home	0	0	0	0	0	0	0	0	0	0	0	0
48	GK	ENG	Brad Mayo	0	0	0	0	0	0	0	0	0	0	0	0

Players not included in matchday squads
No.	Pos.	Nat.	Name
19	MF	WAL	Jordan James †
46	DF	NIR	Tommy Fogarty
49	MF	ENG	Romelle Donovan
