= Ayumu Yokoyama =

Japanese footballer (born 2003)

Ayumu Yokoyama 横山 歩夢
Personal information
- Date of birth: 4 March 2003 (age 23)
- Place of birth: Tokyo, Japan
- Height: 1.70 m (5 ft 7 in)
- Positions: Forward; winger

Team information
- Current team: Genk
- Number: 30

Youth career
- –2017: FC Tucano
- 2018–2020: Tokai Univ. Takanawadai High School

Senior career*
Years	Team	Apps	(Gls)
2021–2022	Matsumoto Yamaga	45	(11)
2023–2024	Sagan Tosu	41	(5)
2024–2025	Birmingham City	10	(0)
2025	→ Jong Genk (loan)	9	(1)
2025–	Genk	17	(2)
2025–2026	Jong Genk	13	(2)

International career
2023	Japan U20	3	(0)
- * Club domestic league appearances and goals as of 25 October 2026

Ayumu Yokoyama (横山 歩夢, Yokoyama Ayumu; born 4 March 2003) is a Japanese professional footballer who plays as a forward or winger for Belgian club Genk. Yokoyama previously played for Matsumoto Yamaga, Sagan Tosu and Birmingham City. He spent time on loan at Belgian Challenger Pro League club Jong Genk during the 2024–25 season. In international football, he represented Japan at under-20 level.

== Career ==
Yokoyama spent two seasons with Matsumoto Yamaga in the J2 League and J3 League before joining J1 League club Sagan Tosu in 2023.

=== Birmingham City ===
In August 2024, he signed a three-year contract with English League One (third-tier) club Birmingham City. He played well in the cup competitions, but was unable to establish himself in the league team, and joined Challenger Pro League club Jong Genk, the B team of Belgian Pro League club Genk, at the end of the mid-season transfer window on loan until the end of the season. He played nine matches and scored once, on 13 April in a 3–1 loss away to RFC Liège.

=== Genk ===
On 25 June 2025, Yokoyama completed a permanent move to Genk for an undisclosed fee.

== Career statistics ==
=== Club ===
As of match played 25 October 2026.

Appearances and goals by club, season and competition
Club	Season	League			National cup (Note: Includes Emperor's Cup, FA Cup, Belgian Cup)		League cup (Note: Includes J.League Cup, EFL Cup)		Other		Total	
Club	Season	Division	Apps	Goals	Apps	Goals	Apps	Goals	Apps	Goals	Apps	Goals
Matsumoto Yamaga	2021	J2 League	16	0	2	0	—		—		18	0
Matsumoto Yamaga	2022	J3 League	29	11	0	0	—		—		29	11
Matsumoto Yamaga	Total		45	11	2	0	—		—		47	11
Sagan Tosu	2023	J1 League	17	0	1	1	1	0	—		19	1
Sagan Tosu	2024	J1 League	24	5	0	0	2	1	—		26	6
Sagan Tosu	Total		41	5	1	1	3	1	—		45	7
Birmingham City	2024–25	EFL League One	10	0	3	1	1	0	5 (Note: Appearances in EFL Trophy)	3	19	4
Jong Genk (loan)	2024–25	Challenger Pro League	9	1	—		—		—		9	1
Genk	2025–26	Belgian Pro League	8	1	—		—		—		8	1
Genk	2026–27	Belgian Pro League	8	1	1	0	—		—		9	1
Genk	Total		16	2	1	0	0	0	—		17	2
Jong Genk	2025–26	Challenger Pro League	13	2	—		—		—		13	2
Career total			134	21	7	2	4	1	5	3	150	27
