= Alex Cochrane (footballer) =

English footballer

Personal information
- Full name: Alexander William Cochrane
- Date of birth: 21 April 2000 (age 26)
- Place of birth: Brighton, England
- Height: 1.75 m (5 ft 9 in)
- Position: Left back

Team information
- Current team: Birmingham City
- Number: 20

Youth career
- Chailey & Newick Colts
- –2019: Brighton & Hove Albion

Senior career*
Years	Team	Apps	(Gls)
2018–2022	Brighton & Hove Albion	0	(0)
2018	→ East Grinstead Town (loan)	1	(0)
2020–2021	→ Union Saint-Gilloise (loan)	7	(0)
2021–2022	→ Heart of Midlothian (loan)	32	(2)
2022–2024	Heart of Midlothian	64	(2)
2024–	Birmingham City	77	(4)

International career
2015	England U16	1	(0)
2019	England U20	2	(0)
- * Club domestic league appearances and goals as of 22:37, 16 July 2026 (UTC)

Alexander William Cochrane (born 21 April 2000) is an English professional footballer who plays as a left-back for EFL Championship club Birmingham City. He has previously played for Heart of Midlothian, Brighton & Hove Albion, East Grinstead Town and Union Saint-Gilloise.

== Club career ==
=== Brighton & Hove Albion ===
Cochrane played football for Chailey & Newick Colts before joining Brighton & Hove Albion as an under-8. He developed in their academy, and was loaned to Isthmian League South side East Grinstead in January 2018. He made his professional debut for Brighton on 25 September 2019, in a 3–1 defeat at home against Aston Villa in the 2019–20 EFL Cup. Cochrane was named in the Premier League matchday squad on 20 July 2020 for the 0–0 home draw against Newcastle United that confirmed Brighton's safety from relegation, but he remained unused.

Cochrane made his first appearance for the senior side in almost a year on 23 September 2020, as a late substitute in a 2–0 away win over Preston North End in the EFL Cup. On 5 October, he joined Belgian First Division B club Union Saint-Gilloise – owned by Brighton chairman Tony Bloom – on loan for the season to gain experience of senior football. He made seven appearances and one assist before surgery on ruptured ankle ligaments kept him out for the rest of the campaign, in which Union gained promotion to the top flight. In May 2021, he signed a one-year contract with Brighton.

=== Heart of Midlothian ===
On 28 June 2021, Cochrane joined Scottish Premiership side Heart of Midlothian on a season-long loan from Brighton. He made his competitive debut two weeks later, playing 83 minutes of the 2–0 away win over Peterhead in the Scottish League Cup. On 31 July, he made his Scottish Premiership debut on the opening day of the 2021–22 season, playing the whole of the 2–1 home victory over Celtic. Cochrane scored his first professional goal, Hearts' third in a 3–0 home win against Livingston, on 25 September. He scored his second goal for the club on 6 November, and also claimed an assist as Hearts beat Dundee United 5–2. On 21 May 2022, Cochrane started and played 100 minutes in the 2022 Scottish Cup final at Hampden Park, in which Hearts lost 2–0 after extra time to Rangers.

Cochrane signed a permanent deal with Hearts on 25 June 2022.

=== Birmingham City ===
On 16 July 2024, recently relegated EFL League One club Birmingham City signed Cochrane on a four-year contract. The fee was undisclosed, but was reported as a seven-figure amount. He made his debut in the starting eleven for the opening fixture of the season, a 1–1 draw at home to Reading. His performances in Birmingham's 2024-25 promotion season earned him a place in the PFA League One Team of the Year. The club earned triple-digit points and he was one of their seven members to be selected.

== International career ==
Cochrane made one appearance for the England U16s, assisting a goal in a 3–3 draw against the United States U15s.

He made his international debut for the England under-20 team on 19 November 2019, in the starting eleven for a 3–0 win against Iceland under-21 at Wycombe Wanderers' Adams Park ground.

== Career statistics ==
As of match played 3 November 2026

Appearances and goals by club, season and competition
Club	Season	League			National cup (Note: Includes FA Cup, Scottish Cup)		League cup (Note: Includes EFL Cup, Scottish League Cup)		Other		Total	
Club	Season	Division	Apps	Goals	Apps	Goals	Apps	Goals	Apps	Goals	Apps	Goals
East Grinstead (loan)	2017–18	Isthmian League South	1	0	—		—		—		1	0
Brighton & Hove Albion U21	2018–19	—			—		—		1 (Note: Appearance(s) in EFL Trophy)	0	1	0
Brighton & Hove Albion U21	2019–20	—			—		—		3	0	3	0
Brighton & Hove Albion U21	Total		—		—		—		4	0	4	0
Brighton & Hove Albion	2019–20	Premier League	0	0	0	0	1	0	—		1	0
Brighton & Hove Albion	2020–21	Premier League	0	0	0	0	1	0	—		1	0
Brighton & Hove Albion	Total		0	0	0	0	2	0	0	0	2	0
Union Saint-Gilloise (loan)	2020–21	Belgian First Division B	7	0	0	0	—		—		7	0
Heart of Midlothian (loan)	2021–22	Scottish Premiership	32	2	3	1	5	0	—		40	3
Heart of Midlothian	2022–23	Scottish Premiership	33	2	3	0	1	0	8 (Note: Two appearances in UEFA Europa League, four appearances in UEFA Europa Conference League)	0	45	2
Heart of Midlothian	2023–24	Scottish Premiership	31	0	3	0	2	0	4	0	40	0
Heart of Midlothian	Total		64	2	6	0	3	0	12	0	85	2
Birmingham City	2024–25	EFL League One	42	1	3	0	2	0	7	0	54	1
Birmingham City	2025–26	EFL Championship	21	1	0	0	2	0	0	0	23	1
Birmingham City	2026–27	EFL Championship	14	2	0	0	2	0	0	0	16	2
Birmingham City	Total		77	4	3	0	6	0	7	0	93	4
Career total			177	8	12	1	16	0	23	0	232	9

== Honours ==
Royale Union Saint-Gilloise

- Belgian First Division B: 2020–21

Heart of Midlothian

- Scottish Cup runner-up: 2021–22

Birmingham City

- EFL League One: 2024–25
- EFL Trophy runner-up: 2024–25

Individual

- EFL League One Team of the Season: 2024–25
- PFA Team of the Year: 2024–25 League One
