= 2024–25 EFL League One =

21st season of EFL League One

EFL League One
- Season: 2024–25
- Dates: 9 August 2024 – 25 May 2025
- Champions: Birmingham City; 2nd League One title
- Promoted: Birmingham City; Wrexham; Charlton Athletic
- Relegated: Bristol Rovers; Crawley Town; Cambridge United; Shrewsbury Town
- Matches: 552
- Goals: 1,427 (2.59 per match)
- Top goalscorer: Charlie Kelman (21 goals)
- Biggest home win: Peterborough United; 6–1 Cambridge United (9 November 2024); Stockport County; 5–0 Bolton Wanderers (9 November 2024); Lincoln City; 5–0 Bristol Rovers (15 March 2025)
- Biggest away win: Stockport County; 0–5 Wycombe Wanderers (5 November 2024); Northampton Town; 0–5 Charlton Athletic (21 December 2024)
- Highest scoring: Cambridge United; 4–4 Blackpool (24 August 2024); Crawley Town; 3–5 Shrewsbury Town (12 October 2024); Exeter City 4–4 Crawley Town (29 December 2024); Exeter City 2–6 Leyton Orient (28 January 2025); Birmingham City 6–2 Barnsley (5 April 2025)
- Longest winning run: Wycombe Wanderers (8 games)
- Longest unbeaten run: Wycombe Wanderers (19 games)
- Longest winless run: Shrewsbury Town (14 games)
- Longest losing run: Burton Albion (7 games)
- Highest attendance: 27,985; Birmingham City vs Reading (10 August 2024)
- Lowest attendance: 1,749; Burton Albion vs Charlton Athletic (26 November 2024)
- Total attendance: 5,555,221
- Average attendance: 10,064
- All statistics correct as of 3 May 2025.

The 2024–25 EFL League One (referred to as the Sky Bet League One due to sponsorship reasons) was the 21st season of the EFL League One under its current title, and the 33rd season under its current league division format. The season began on 9 August 2024, and ended on 25 May 2025, with the playoff final.

== Team changes ==
The following teams have changed division since the 2023–24 season:

=== To League One ===
Promoted from League Two

- Stockport County
- Wrexham
- Mansfield Town
- Crawley Town

Relegated from the Championship

- Birmingham City
- Huddersfield Town
- Rotherham United

=== From League One ===
Promoted to the Championship

- Portsmouth
- Derby County
- Oxford United

Relegated to League Two

- Cheltenham Town
- Fleetwood Town
- Port Vale
- Carlisle United

== Stadiums and locations ==
Locations of the 2024–25 EFL League One teams

Note: Table lists in alphabetical order.

Team	Location	Stadium	Capacity
Barnsley	Barnsley	Oakwell	23,287
Birmingham City	Birmingham (Bordesley)	St Andrew's	29,409
Blackpool	Blackpool	Bloomfield Road	16,500
Bolton Wanderers	Horwich	Toughsheet Community Stadium	28,723
Bristol Rovers	Bristol (Horfield)	Memorial Stadium	9,832
Burton Albion	Burton upon Trent	Pirelli Stadium	6,912
Cambridge United	Cambridge	Abbey Stadium	8,127
Charlton Athletic	London (Charlton)	The Valley	27,111
Crawley Town	Crawley	Broadfield Stadium	5,996
Exeter City	Exeter	St. James Park	8,720
Huddersfield Town	Huddersfield	Kirklees Stadium	24,121
Leyton Orient	London (Leyton)	Brisbane Road	9,271
Lincoln City	Lincoln	Sincil Bank	10,669
Mansfield Town	Mansfield	Field Mill	9,186
Northampton Town	Northampton (Sixfields)	Sixfields Stadium	8,200
Peterborough United	Peterborough	London Road Stadium	13,511
Reading	Reading	Madejski Stadium	24,161
Rotherham United	Rotherham	New York Stadium	12,021
Shrewsbury Town	Shrewsbury	New Meadow	9,875
Stevenage	Stevenage	Broadhall Way	7,300
Stockport County	Stockport (Edgeley)	Edgeley Park	10,852
Wigan Athletic	Wigan	Brick Community Stadium	25,138
Wrexham	Wrexham	Racecourse Ground	13,341
Wycombe Wanderers	High Wycombe	Adams Park	10,137

== Personnel and sponsoring ==
Team	Manager	Captain	Kit manufacturer	Shirt sponsor (chest)	Shirt sponsor (back)	Shirt sponsor (sleeve)	Shorts sponsor
Barnsley	(Republic of Ireland) Conor Hourihane	(Republic of Ireland) Luca Connell	(Germany) Puma	Gleeson Homes (H & A)/Breast Cancer UK (T)	Vitruvian Dental Studio	House of Parliament	Rapid Response Telecoms
Birmingham City	(Wales) Chris Davies	(Poland) Krystian Bielik	(United States) Nike	Undefeated	Visit Birmingham, Alabama	Delta Air Lines	None
Blackpool	(England) Steve Bruce	(England) James Husband	(Germany) Puma	TreadTracker.com (H)/Pleasure Beach Resort (A)	Visit Blackpool	None	None
Bolton Wanderers	(England) Steven Schumacher	(England) George Thomason	(Italy) Macron	Victorian Plumbing(H & A)/Bolton Wanderers in the Community (T)	Ebuyer	Whites Beaconsfield	Utilita
Bristol Rovers	(Spain) Iñigo Calderón	(England) Scott Sinclair	(Italy) Macron	FanHub	Poplar Insulation	Hotchkins Group	None
Burton Albion	(England) Gary Bowyer	(Republic of Ireland) Ryan Sweeney	(England) TAG	Burton Kia	Russell Roof Tiles	Bovril	Home and Trade
Cambridge United	(England) Neil Harris	(England) Michael Morrison	(England) Umbro	BrewBoard	The Hill Group	Fora	Alan Boswell Group
Charlton Athletic	(Wales) Nathan Jones	(Scotland) Greg Docherty	(England) Castore	RSK Group	RSK Group	PiLON Ltd	None
Crawley Town	(England) Scott Lindsey	(England) Dion Conroy	(Italy) Errea	Rentokil Initial	Eden Utilities	Brick Borrow	Beaufort Homes
Exeter City	(Scotland) Gary Caldwell	(Republic of Ireland) Pierce Sweeney	(Germany) Adidas	HEL Performance	Footasylum	Bidfood	EMS Waste Services
Huddersfield Town	(England) Jon Worthington (interim)	(England) Jonathan Hogg	(England) Umbro	Utilita	SportsBroker	Core Facility	Leading Edge Signage
Leyton Orient	(England) Richie Wellens	(England) Darren Pratley	(Germany) Puma	Eastdil Secured	Moore Kingston Smith	Peritium Search Associates	Quattro Group
Lincoln City	(England) Michael Skubala	(Republic of Ireland) Paudie O'Connor	(England) Oxen	Branston (H)/University of Lincoln (A)	Allen Signs	Easy Heat Pumps	Nicholsons Chartered Accountants
Mansfield Town	(England) Nigel Clough	(England) Alfie Kilgour	(England) Castore	One Call Insurance (H)/OCL Solicitors (A)/BeeNoticed (T)	A. Wass Funeral Directors (H)/AGG Electrical Safety Testing (A)	Source Travel (H)	A Woodland & Son
Northampton Town	(England) Kevin Nolan	(England) Jon Guthrie	(Germany) Puma	University of Northampton	Snowdon Homes Ltd	Green Ape Media	LCS The Cleaning Company
Peterborough United	(Scotland) Darren Ferguson	(Cyprus) Hector Kyprianou	(Germany) Puma	Mick George Group	Princebuild	Next Level FibreOptics	Millfield Auto Parts
Reading	(Republic of Ireland) Noel Hunt	(Ghana) Andy Yiadom	(Italy) Macron	Select Car Leasing	None	None	CRL Fire & Flood Damage
Rotherham United	(England) Matt Hamshaw	(Jamaica) Jonson Clarke-Harris	(Germany) Puma	Bluebell Wood	KCM Waste Management	Defaqto	Mears Group
Shrewsbury Town	(England) Michael Appleton	(England) John Marquis	(England) Oxen	Morris Property (H)/Shropshire Homes (A & T)	Jim Dorricott Construction	R1 Construction	Hanmart Windows & Doors
Stevenage	(England) Alex Revell	(England) Carl Piergianni	(Italy) Macron	Xsolla	HG Group	Everyone Active	Perfect Pet Insurance
Stockport County	(England) Dave Challinor	(England) Lewis Bate	(Germany) Puma	VITA	DeliveryApp	GroFu	None
Wigan Athletic	(England) Ryan Lowe	(Scotland) Jason Kerr	(Germany) Puma	Smurfit Westrock	Greenmount Projects	None	None
Wrexham	(England) Phil Parkinson	(Republic of Ireland) James McClean	(Italy) Macron	United Airlines	Meta Quest	HP	None
Wycombe Wanderers	(England) Mike Dodds	(Scotland) Jack Grimmer	(Denmark) Hummel	Origin Doors and Windows	Buckinghamshire New University	Kress	Cherry Red Records

== Managerial changes ==
Team	Outgoing manager	Manner of departure	Date of vacancy	Position in the table	Incoming manager	Date of appointment
Barnsley	(Republic of Ireland) Martin Devaney	End of interim spell	7 May 2024	Pre-season	(England) Darrell Clarke	23 May 2024
Birmingham City	(England) Gary Rowett	End of interim spell	7 May 2024	Pre-season	(England) Tony Mowbray	7 May 2024
Huddersfield Town	(Germany) André Breitenreiter	Mutual consent	10 May 2024	Pre-season	(Northern Ireland) Michael Duff	13 May 2024
Birmingham City	(England) Tony Mowbray	Resigned	21 May 2024	Pre-season	(Wales) Chris Davies	6 June 2024
Burton Albion	(Northern Ireland) Martin Paterson	End of contract	31 May 2024	Pre-season	(England) Mark Robinson	4 June 2024
Blackpool	(England) Neil Critchley	Sacked	21 August 2024	23rd	(England) Steve Bruce	3 September 2024
Crawley Town	(England) Scott Lindsey	Signed by Milton Keynes Dons	25 September 2024	18th	(Republic of Ireland) Rob Elliot	1 October 2024
Burton Albion	(England) Mark Robinson	Sacked	23 October 2024	24th	(England) Gary Bowyer	17 December 2024
Shrewsbury Town	(England) Paul Hurst	Sacked	3 November 2024	23rd	(England) Gareth Ainsworth	13 November 2024
Northampton Town	(Australia) Jon Brady	Resigned	5 December 2024	21st	(England) Kevin Nolan	23 December 2024
Reading	(Spain) Rubén Sellés	Signed by Hull City	6 December 2024	6th	(Republic of Ireland) Noel Hunt	6 December 2024
Bristol Rovers	(England) Matt Taylor	Sacked	16 December 2024	20th	(Spain) Iñigo Calderón	26 December 2024
Wycombe Wanderers	(England) Matt Bloomfield	Signed by Luton Town	14 January 2025	2nd	(England) Mike Dodds	2 February 2025
Bolton Wanderers	(England) Ian Evatt	Mutual consent	22 January 2025	9th	(England) Steven Schumacher	30 January 2025
Cambridge United	(England) Garry Monk	Sacked	16 February 2025	24th	(England) Neil Harris	19 February 2025
Wigan Athletic	(Scotland) Shaun Maloney	Sacked	2 March 2025	15th	(England) Ryan Lowe	12 March 2025
Huddersfield Town	(Northern Ireland) Michael Duff	Sacked	9 March 2025	7th	(England) Jon Worthington (interim)	9 March 2025
Barnsley	(England) Darrell Clarke	Sacked	12 March 2025	10th	(Republic of Ireland) Conor Hourihane (Note: Initially appointed as caretaker manager until the end of the season, officially named as permanent manager on 18 April 2025.)	12 March 2025
Crawley Town	(Republic of Ireland) Rob Elliot	Sacked	19 March 2025	22nd	(England) Scott Lindsey	21 March 2025
Shrewsbury Town	(England) Gareth Ainsworth	Signed by Gillingham	25 March 2025	24th	(England) Michael Appleton	26 March 2025
Rotherham United	(Scotland) Steve Evans	Sacked	30 March 2025	16th	(England) Matt Hamshaw (interim)	30 March 2025

== League table ==
Pos	Team	Pld	W	D	L	GF	GA	GD	Pts	Promotion, qualification or relegation
1	Birmingham City (C, P)	46	34	9	3	84	31	+53	111	Promotion to EFL Championship
2	Wrexham (P)	46	27	11	8	67	34	+33	92	Promotion to EFL Championship
3	Stockport County	46	25	12	9	72	42	+30	87	Qualification for League One play-offs
4	Charlton Athletic (O, P)	46	25	10	11	67	43	+24	85	Qualification for League One play-offs
5	Wycombe Wanderers	46	24	12	10	70	45	+25	84	Qualification for League One play-offs
6	Leyton Orient	46	24	6	16	72	48	+24	78	Qualification for League One play-offs
7	Reading	46	21	12	13	68	57	+11	75	
8	Bolton Wanderers	46	20	8	18	67	70	−3	68	
9	Blackpool	46	17	16	13	72	60	+12	67	
10	Huddersfield Town	46	19	7	20	58	55	+3	64	
11	Lincoln City	46	16	13	17	64	56	+8	61	
12	Barnsley	46	17	10	19	69	73	−4	61	
13	Rotherham United	46	16	11	19	54	59	−5	59	
14	Stevenage	46	15	12	19	42	50	−8	57	
15	Wigan Athletic	46	13	17	16	40	42	−2	56	
16	Exeter City	46	15	11	20	49	65	−16	56	
17	Mansfield Town	46	15	9	22	60	73	−13	54	
18	Peterborough United	46	13	12	21	68	81	−13	51	
19	Northampton Town	46	12	15	19	48	66	−18	51	
20	Burton Albion	46	11	14	21	49	66	−17	47	
21	Crawley Town (R)	46	12	10	24	57	83	−26	46	Relegation to EFL League Two
22	Bristol Rovers (R)	46	12	7	27	44	76	−32	43	Relegation to EFL League Two
23	Cambridge United (R)	46	9	11	26	45	73	−28	38	Relegation to EFL League Two
24	Shrewsbury Town (R)	46	8	9	29	41	79	−38	33	Relegation to EFL League Two

Source: EFL Official Website
Rules for classification: 1) Points; 2) Goal difference; 3) Number of goals scored; 4) Head-to-head results; 5) Wins; 6) Away goals; 7) Penalty points (sec 9.5); 8) 12-point sending off offences
(C) Champions; (O) Play-off winners; (P) Promoted; (R) Relegated

== Results ==
Home \ Away	BAR	BIR	BLA	BOL	BRI	BRT	CAM	CHA	CRA	EXE	HUD	LEY	LIN	MAN	NOR	PET	REA	ROT	SHR	STE	STK	WIG	WRX	WYC
Barnsley	—	1–2	0–3	4–1	2–1	0–0	1–1	2–2	3–0	1–2	1–2	0–4	4–3	1–2	2–2	1–1	2–2	2–0	1–2	0–1	1–1	0–1	2–1	2–2
Birmingham City	6–2	—	0–0	2–0	2–0	2–0	4–0	1–0	0–0	1–0	1–0	2–0	1–0	4–0	1–1	3–2	1–1	2–1	4–1	2–1	2–0	2–1	3–1	1–0
Blackpool	1–2	0–2	—	2–1	4–1	3–0	2–1	2–2	3–1	2–1	2–2	1–2	1–1	3–3	0–0	0–0	3–0	0–0	1–1	0–0	0–3	2–2	1–2	2–2
Bolton Wanderers	1–2	3–1	2–1	—	1–0	2–1	2–2	1–2	4–3	0–2	0–4	2–1	3–0	3–1	3–1	1–0	5–2	0–1	2–2	1–1	0–1	0–2	0–0	0–2
Bristol Rovers	3–1	1–2	0–2	3–2	—	3–1	2–0	3–2	0–0	1–2	1–0	2–3	1–1	1–2	1–0	3–1	0–2	2–3	1–0	0–1	1–1	0–4	1–1	1–2
Burton Albion	1–2	1–2	1–1	1–2	1–3	—	2–1	0–1	0–0	1–2	3–0	2–1	2–3	1–1	0–1	2–2	3–2	4–2	2–0	0–0	0–3	1–1	0–1	2–3
Cambridge United	1–1	1–2	4–4	1–1	0–1	1–0	—	0–1	0–1	0–1	0–4	1–2	0–2	3–2	1–1	0–1	1–3	0–1	4–1	0–1	2–0	2–0	2–2	1–1
Charlton Athletic	1–0	1–0	1–2	2–0	2–0	3–1	2–1	—	1–2	3–0	4–0	1–0	2–2	0–0	2–1	2–1	0–0	1–1	1–0	2–0	1–1	2–1	2–2	2–1
Crawley Town	0–3	0–1	2–1	0–2	1–0	1–1	0–2	0–1	—	3–1	2–2	1–3	3–0	0–2	3–0	3–4	1–1	1–0	3–5	3–1	1–1	1–1	1–2	1–1
Exeter City	1–2	0–2	1–3	1–2	3–1	0–0	1–0	1–0	4–4	—	3–1	2–6	0–0	2–0	1–1	1–2	1–2	1–0	2–0	2–0	0–2	1–1	0–2	2–2
Huddersfield Town	2–0	0–1	0–2	0–1	3–1	1–1	1–2	2–1	5–1	2–0	—	1–4	2–2	2–1	1–3	0–1	0–0	0–0	1–0	2–1	1–0	1–0	0–1	0–1
Leyton Orient	4–3	1–2	3–0	1–2	3–0	0–0	2–0	1–2	3–0	0–1	0–2	—	3–2	3–0	1–2	2–2	2–0	1–0	1–0	1–0	0–1	0–0	0–0	1–0
Lincoln City	1–2	1–3	0–2	4–2	5–0	0–1	1–1	0–0	4–1	0–0	1–0	2–1	—	4–1	2–1	5–1	2–0	0–1	1–1	0–0	2–1	0–0	0–2	2–3
Mansfield Town	2–1	1–1	2–0	2–1	0–1	3–3	2–1	1–2	0–1	3–0	1–2	2–3	0–3	—	0–1	4–2	1–5	1–0	2–1	0–1	1–1	0–0	1–2	1–2
Northampton Town	1–2	1–1	0–2	2–4	2–1	0–0	0–0	0–5	3–0	2–1	3–2	1–0	0–1	0–2	—	2–1	0–0	0–2	4–1	0–0	1–1	1–1	0–2	1–2
Peterborough United	1–3	1–2	5–1	1–1	3–2	0–1	6–1	3–0	4–3	1–1	0–2	0–0	1–1	0–3	0–4	—	1–2	3–3	3–1	2–1	1–1	1–0	0–2	1–1
Reading	2–4	0–0	0–3	1–0	1–0	3–1	3–0	2–0	4–1	0–0	2–1	0–1	0–1	2–1	4–1	3–1	—	2–1	1–1	1–1	1–3	2–0	2–0	1–0
Rotherham United	0–1	0–2	2–1	3–1	0–0	2–2	2–1	4–2	0–4	1–1	2–1	1–0	2–1	3–3	3–0	2–1	2–1	—	1–2	2–0	1–1	0–1	0–1	2–3
Shrewsbury Town	0–2	3–2	1–2	2–3	0–0	0–2	0–1	0–1	1–2	0–2	0–1	3–0	1–0	2–1	1–1	1–4	1–3	1–1	—	0–1	0–2	0–1	2–1	1–4
Stevenage	3–0	0–1	1–3	1–4	3–0	0–1	0–2	1–0	3–1	4–1	1–2	0–0	0–1	1–1	2–0	1–1	1–1	1–1	1–0	—	2–1	1–2	1–0	0–3
Stockport County	2–1	1–1	2–1	5–0	2–0	2–1	2–0	0–0	2–0	2–0	2–1	1–4	3–2	1–2	1–1	2–1	4–1	3–1	1–0	3–0	—	0–0	1–0	0–5
Wigan Athletic	1–1	0–3	1–1	0–1	2–0	1–2	1–0	0–1	1–0	0–0	2–1	0–2	1–1	1–2	2–1	3–0	1–2	1–0	2–2	0–0	0–2	—	0–0	0–1
Wrexham	1–0	1–1	2–1	0–0	1–1	3–0	2–2	3–0	2–1	3–0	0–0	1–2	1–0	1–0	4–1	1–0	3–0	1–0	3–0	2–3	1–0	2–1	—	3–2
Wycombe Wanderers	2–1	2–3	1–1	0–0	2–0	2–0	2–1	0–4	1–0	2–1	0–1	3–0	1–0	1–0	0–0	3–1	1–1	2–0	0–0	1–0	1–3	0–0	0–1	—

Legend: Blue = home team win; Yellow = draw; Red = away team win.
For upcoming matches, an "a" indicates there is an article about the rivalry between the two participants.

== Play-offs ==
=== Bracket ===
Semi-finals
6	Leyton Orient	2	1	3 (4)
3	Stockport County	2	1	3 (1)
5	Wycombe Wanderers	0	0	0
4	Charlton Athletic	0	1	1

Final
6	Leyton Orient	0
4	Charlton Athletic	1

=== Semi-finals ===
First leg

10 May 2025
12:30 BST

Leyton Orient	2–2	Stockport County
Kelman 30', 88' (pen.)	Report	Norwood 60' (pen.); Horsfall 65'

Brisbane Road, London
Attendance: 8,571
Referee: Ben Speedie
11 May 2025
18:30 BST

Wycombe Wanderers	0–0	Charlton Athletic
	Report

Adams Park, High Wycombe
Attendance: 6,585
Referee: Farai Hallam

Second leg

14 May 2025
20:00 BST

Stockport County	1–1 (a.e.t.)	Leyton Orient
Olaofe 74'	Report	O'Neill 3'
Penalties
Norwood (penalty scored); Diamond (penalty missed); Rydel (penalty missed)	1–4	(penalty scored) James; (penalty scored) Clare; (penalty scored) Abdulai; (penalty scored) Galbraith

Edgeley Park, Stockport
Attendance: 10,592
Referee: James Bell

3–3 on aggregate, Leyton Orient won 4–1 on penalties.

15 May 2025
20:00 BST

Charlton Athletic	1–0	Wycombe Wanderers
Godden 81'	Report

The Valley, London
Attendance: 25,722
Referee: Dean Whitestone

Charlton Athletic won 1–0 on aggregate.

=== Final ===
25 May 2025
13:01 BST

Charlton Athletic	1–0	Leyton Orient
Gillesphey 31'	Report

Wembley Stadium, London
Attendance: 76,193
Referee: Andrew Kitchen

== Season statistics ==
As of 3 May 2025

=== Top scorers ===
Rank	Player	Club	Goals
1	(United States) Charlie Kelman	Leyton Orient	21
2	(England) Jay Stansfield	Birmingham City	19
3	(England) Matthew Godden	Charlton Athletic	18
3	(England) Davis Keillor-Dunn	Barnsley	18
3	(Ivory Coast) Richard Kone	Wycombe Wanderers	18
3	(England) Sam Smith	Reading; Wrexham	18
7	(England) Alfie May	Birmingham City	16
8	(England) Louie Barry	Stockport County	15

=== Hat-tricks ===
Player	For	Against	Score	Date	Ref
(Northern Ireland) Dion Charles	Bolton Wanderers	Reading	5–2	21 September 2024	
(Ivory Coast) Richard Kone	Wycombe Wanderers	Peterborough United	3–1	19 October 2024	
(Ghana) Kwame Poku	Peterborough United	Cambridge United	6–1	9 November 2024	
(Scotland) Azeem Abdulai	Leyton Orient	Exeter City	2–6	28 January 2025	
(England) Jovon Makama	Lincoln City	Bristol Rovers	5–0	15 March 2025	
(England) Abraham Odoh	Peterborough United	Crawley Town	3–4	1 April 2025	
(Scotland) Rob Apter	Blackpool	Stevenage	1–3	18 April 2025	

=== Discipline ===
==== Player ====
- Most yellow cards: 15
  - (England) Bradley Ibrahim (Crawley Town)
- Most red cards: 3
  - (Guyana) Terence Vancooten (Burton Albion)

==== Club ====
- Most yellow cards: 114
  - Bolton Wanderers
- Most red cards: 6
  - Burton Albion
  - Peterborough United
- Fewest yellow cards: 63
  - Rotherham United
- Fewest red cards: 0
  - Rotherham United
  - Wrexham

== Awards ==
=== Monthly ===
Each month the EFL announces their official Player of the Month and Manager of the Month for League One.

Month	Manager of the Month		Player of the Month		Reference
August	(England) Phil Parkinson	Wrexham	(England) Louie Barry	Stockport County	
September	(England) Steve Bruce	Blackpool	(Ghana) Kwame Poku	Peterborough United	
October	(England) Matt Bloomfield	Wycombe Wanderers	(Ghana) Kwame Poku	Peterborough United	
November	(England) Matt Bloomfield	Wycombe Wanderers	(England) Louie Barry	Stockport County	
December	(England) Richie Wellens	Leyton Orient	(England) Miles Leaburn	Charlton Athletic	
January	(England) Richie Wellens	Leyton Orient	(Jamaica) Rumarn Burrell	Burton Albion	
February	(Wales) Chris Davies	Birmingham City	(England) Niall Ennis	Blackpool	
March	(England) Phil Parkinson	Wrexham	(England) Jovon Makama	Lincoln City	
April	(Wales) Chris Davies	Birmingham City	(United States) Charlie Kelman	Leyton Orient	

=== Annual ===
Award	Winner	Club
Player of the Season	(Ivory Coast) Richard Kone	Wycombe Wanderers
Young Player of the Season	(Ivory Coast) Richard Kone	Wycombe Wanderers
Apprentice of the Season	(England) Jake Richards	Exeter City

League One Team of the Season

Pos.	Player	Club	Ref.
GK	(England) Sam Tickle	Wigan Athletic	
CB	(England) Max Cleworth	Wrexham	
CB	(Austria) Christoph Klarer	Birmingham City	
CB	(England) Lloyd Jones	Charlton Athletic	
RWB	(England) Ryan Barnett	Wrexham	
CM	(Japan) Tomoki Iwata	Birmingham City	
CM	(England) Lewis Bate	Stockport County	
LWB	(England) Alex Cochrane	Birmingham City	
RW	(Ghana) Kwame Poku	Peterborough United	
ST	(Ivory Coast) Richard Kone	Wycombe Wanderers	
LW	(England) Davis Keillor-Dunn	Barnsley	
Manager	(Wales) Chris Davies	Birmingham City	

== Attendances ==
#	Football club	Home games	Average attendance
1	Birmingham City	23	26,283
2	Bolton Wanderers	23	21,325
3	Huddersfield Town	23	18,817
4	Charlton Athletic	23	15,255
5	Wrexham	23	12,781
6	Reading	23	12,535
7	Barnsley	23	12,211
8	Wigan Athletic	23	9,946
9	Blackpool	23	9,623
10	Stockport County	23	9,603
11	Rotherham United	23	9,359
12	Peterborough United	23	9,151
13	Lincoln City	23	9,004
14	Leyton Orient	23	7,890
15	Bristol Rovers	23	7,880
16	Mansfield Town	23	7,769
17	Cambridge United	23	6,640
18	Northampton Town	23	6,568
19	Exeter City	23	6,513
20	Shrewsbury Town	23	6,255
21	Wycombe Wanderers	23	5,362
22	Crawley Town	23	4,307
23	Stevenage	23	3,989
24	Burton Albion	23	3,254
