= 2026–27 Birmingham City F.C. season =

English football club season

Birmingham City
2026–27 season
- Owners: Shelby Companies Ltd (96.64%); Others (3.36)
- Chairman: Tom Wagner
- Manager: Chris Davies
- Stadium: St Andrew's
Home colours	Away colours	Third colours

The 2026–27 season is Birmingham City Football Club's 124th season in the English football league system and second consecutive season being in the second-tier, Championship. As with all second-tier League clubs, the team would also compete in the FA Cup, and the EFL Cup.

== Pre-season ==
On 15 May, Blues announced a six-day training camp in Lagos between 5–11 July, with a friendly against Huddersfield Town later confirmed. On 12 June, two friendlies were confirmed against Crewe Alexandra and Northampton Town. Four days later, a trip to face Burton Albion was added. A home fixture against Barcelona was next to be confirmed. On 1 July, the latest edition of the Arthur Cup was announced with a fixture against Solihull Moors.

Pre-season friendly match details
Date	Time	Opponents	Venue	Result	Score F–A	Scorers	Ref.
10 July 2026	11:00	Huddersfield Town	N	W	3–1	Gray 20' (pen.), Furuhashi (2) 87', 88'	
15 July 2026	17:30	Solihull Moors	A	W	3–0	Priske 5' (pen.), (o.g.) 51', Gray 90'	
22 July 2026	19:30	Burton Albion	A	W	1–0	Priske 28'	
25 July 2026	15:00	Crewe Alexandra	A	W	2–1	Stansfield 5', Bateman 59'	
25 July 2026	15:00	Northampton Town	A	W	2–0	Gray (2) 14', 18'	
31 July 2026	19:45	Barcelona	H	D	2–2 (3–2 p)	Priske 31', Solís 68'	

== EFL Championship ==
=== League table ===
Pos	Team	Pld	W	D	L	GF	GA	GD	Pts	Promotion, qualification or relegation
2	Stoke City	16	10	2	4	25	18	+7	32	Promotion to the Premier League
3	Wolverhampton Wanderers	16	9	4	3	28	19	+9	31	Qualification for Championship play-off semi-finals
4	Birmingham City	16	8	5	3	28	15	+13	29	Qualification for Championship play-off semi-finals
5	West Bromwich Albion	16	8	5	3	25	17	+8	29	Qualification for Championship play-off quarter-finals
6	Southampton	16	9	4	3	31	15	+16	27 (Note: Southampton were deducted four points due to multiple breaches of EFL regulations related to the unauthorised filming of other clubs' training.)	Qualification for Championship play-off quarter-finals

Updated to match(es) played on 22 November 2026. Source: EFL Official Website
Rules for classification: 1) Points; 2) Goal difference; 3) Number of goals scored; 4) Head-to-head results; 5) Wins; 6) Away goals; 7) Penalty points (sec 9.5); 8) Number of 12-point sending off offences; 9) Play-off (only if needed to determine promotion/relegation)

=== Results summary ===
Overall								Home						Away					
Pld	W	D	L	GF	GA	GD	Pts	W	D	L	GF	GA	GD	W	D	L	GF	GA	GD
16	8	5	3	28	15	+13	29	4	4	0	19	8	+11	4	1	3	9	7	+2

Last updated: 21 November 2026.

=== Match results ===
On 25 June, the Championship fixtures were revealed.

Championship match details
Date	League position	Time	Opponents	Venue	Result	Score F–A	Scorers	Attendance	Refs
15 August 2026	14th	17:30	Sheffield United	A	D	0–0	—	27,684	
22 August 2026	14th	12:30	Bristol City	H	D	2–2	Tickle 42' (o.g.), Gray 90+5' (pen.)	27,284	
28 August 2026	8th	20:00	Wrexham	A	W	2–1	Neumann 13', 63'	10,536	
1 September 2026	8th	19:45	Southampton	H	D	1–1	Priske 55'	25,007	
6 September 2026	10th	12:00	Wolverhampton Wanderers	H	D	2–2	Stansfield 22', Tchatchoua 36' (o.g.)	27,503	
9 September 2026	15th	19:45	Norwich City	A	L	1–2	Vicente 64'	25,548	
12 September 2026	10th	12:30	Derby County	A	W	2–1	Vicente 42', Paik Seung-ho 63'	28,121	
19 September 2026	10th	15:00	Middlesbrough	H	D	2–2	Millar 55', McGree 59' (o.g.)	27,017	
10 October 2026	8th	12:30	West Bromwich Albion	A	W	1–0	Priske 41' (pen.)	25,933	
13 October 2026	4th	19:45	Preston North End	H	W	4–0	Millar 34', Priske (2) 45+2', 45+4', Gray 76'	23,927	
17 October 2026	4th	15:00	Queens Park Rangers	H	W	3–0	Millar (2) 27', 49', Gray 90+1'	27,688	
24 October 2026	7th	15:00	Cardiff City	A	L	0–1	—	23,280	
31 October 2026	6th	12:30	Lincoln City	A	W	3–1	Priske (2) 16', 60', Cochrane 73'	10,551	
3 November 2026	3rd	19:45	Millwall	H	W	3–0	Cochrane 1', Bird 16', Stansfield 29'	25,044	
7 November 2026	1st	15:00	Swansea City	H	W	2–1	Stansfield (2) 29', 87'	28,005	
21 November 2026	4th	15:00	Stoke City	A	L	0–1	—	26,913	
25 November 2026		19:45	Burnley	A					
28 November 2026		15:00	Bolton Wanderers	H					
5 December 2026		15:00	Charlton Athletic	A					
8 December 2026		19:45	Watford	H					
12 December 2026		15:00	Portsmouth	A					
19 December 2026		12:30	West Ham United	H					
26 December 2026		15:00	Blackburn Rovers	A					
29 December 2026		20:00	Cardiff City	H					
1 January 2027		15:00	Portsmouth	H					
16 January 2027		12:30	Queens Park Rangers	A					
23 January 2027		12:30	Lincoln City	H					
26 January 2027		19:45	Millwall	A					
30 January 2027		12:30	Swansea City	A					
6 February 2027		15:00	Stoke City	H					
12 February 2027		20:00	Derby County	H					
16 February 2027		19:45	Preston North End	A					
19 February 2027		20:00	Middlesbrough	A					
26 February 2027		20:00	West Bromwich Albion	H					
2 March 2027		20:00	Bristol City	A					

== FA Cup ==
FA Cup match details
Round	Date	Time	Opponents	Venue	Result	Score F–A	Scorers	Attendance	Refs

== EFL Cup ==
Birmingham were drawn away to Swansea City in the first round and home to Brentford in the second round.

EFL Cup match details
Round	Date	Time	Opponents	Venue	Result	Score F–A	Scorers	Attendance	Refs
First round	8 August 2026	15:00	Swansea City	A	W	1–0	Priske 44'	11,283	
Second round	25 August 2026	20:00	Brentford	H	L	1–6	Gray 28'	17,722	

== Transfers and contracts ==
=== In ===
Date	Player	Club	Fee	Refs
15 June 2026	(Colombia) Jhon Solís	(Spain) Girona	£6,000,000	
3 July 2026	(England) Dael Fry	(England) Middlesbrough	Free	
8 July 2026	(England) Junior Wilson	(England) Aston Villa	Free	
27 July 2026	(England) Finn McGreevy	(England) Hampton & Richmond Borough	Free	
28 July 2026	(Argentina) Luis Vázquez	(Belgium) Anderlecht	£3,000,000	
30 July 2026	(United States) Kristoffer Lund	(Italy) Palermo	Undisclosed	
14 August 2026	(England) Max Bird	(England) Bristol City	Undisclosed	

=== Loaned in ===
Date	Player	Club	Loaned until	Refs
17 July 2026	(England) James Beadle	(England) Brighton & Hove Albion	End of Season	
1 September 2026	(Canada) Liam Millar	(England) Hull City	End of Season	

=== Loaned out ===
Date	Player	Club	Loaned until	Refs
4 August 2026	(England) Louie Rea	(England) Leamington	Undisclosed (Note: On 1 September, Rea's loan at Leamington was extended.)	
18 August 2026	(England) Briar Bateman	(England) Oxford City	14 October 2026 (Note: On 16 September, Bateman's initial one-month loan at Oxford City was extended by a further 28-days. On 15 October, it was extended for a further month once again)	
17 September 2026	(Japan) Kanya Fujimoto	(Japan) Tokyo Verdy	End of Season	
26 September 2026	(Republic of Ireland) Billy Burrell	(England) AFC Telford United	26 October 2026	
22 October 2026	(Zimbabwe) Menzi Mazwi	(England) Buxton	22 November 2026	
23 October 2026	(England) Louie Rea	(England) Alvechurch	23 November 2026	
30 October 2026	(England) Alezandro Da Silva	(England) Redditch United	30 November 2026	
31 October 2026	(Republic of Ireland) Billy Burrell	(England) Real Bedford	30 November 2026	
31 October 2026	(England) William O'Sullivan	(England) Real Bedford	30 November 2026	

=== Out ===
Date	Player	Club	Fee	Refs
30 June 2026	(England) Byron Pendleton	(England) Shrewsbury Town	Undisclosed	
17 July 2026	(Germany) Kai Wagner	(United States) Philadelphia Union	£3,850,000	
21 July 2026	(Japan) Kyōgo Furuhashi	(United States) LA Galaxy	Undisclosed	
21 August 2026	(Algeria) Zaid Betteka	(England) Spalding United	Free	

=== Released / out of contract ===
Date	Player	Subsequent Club	Joined date	Refs
30 June 2026	(England) Cameron Eubank	(England) Leamington	1 July 2026	
30 June 2026	(Northern Ireland) Tom Fogarty	(England) Tamworth	1 July 2026	
30 June 2026	(England) Aurelien Guernier	(Italy) AC Milan	1 July 2026	
30 June 2026	(England) Ben Wodskou	(England) Solihull Moors	1 July 2026	
30 June 2026	(England) O'Shea Ellis	(England) Brackley Town	14 July 2026	
30 June 2026	(England) George Wynne	(United States) Georgia State Panthers	1 August 2026	
30 June 2026	(England) Yusuf Ahmed			
30 June 2026	(Belgium) Godfred Boakye			
30 June 2026	(England) Trae Briscoe			
30 June 2026	(Republic of Ireland) Daniel Isichei			
30 June 2026	(England) Jonathan Panzo	(Greece) Levadiakos	15 September 2026	
30 June 2026	(England) Cody Pennington			
30 June 2026	(England) Frank Tattum			
30 June 2026	(England) Szymon Terenowicz			
30 June 2026	(Wales) Zach Willis			
1 September 2026	(England) Jack Robinson	(England) Derby County	17 October 2026	

=== New contract ===
Date	Player	Contract expiry	Refs
15 May 2026	(England) Briar Bateman	30 June 2027	
15 May 2026	(Republic of Ireland) Billy Burrell	30 June 2027	
15 May 2026	(England) Alezandro Da Silva	30 June 2027	
15 May 2026	(England) Caleb Sanders	30 June 2027	
15 May 2026	(England) Tyrese Warmington	30 June 2027	
5 June 2026	(England) Bradley Mayo	30 June 2028 (Note: Includes a club option for an additional year)	
8 July 2026	(England) Salif Bamba	30 June 2028 (Note: First professional contract) (Note: Includes an option for an additional year)	
8 July 2026	(England) Cobi Maddox	30 June 2028	
8 July 2026	(England) Dynaeo Martin-Moore	30 June 2028	
8 July 2026	(England) William O'Sullivan	30 June 2027	
8 July 2026	(England) Jack Quirk	30 June 2028	
8 July 2026	(England) Louie Rea	30 June 2027	
8 July 2026	(England) Riquelme Thompson-Jones	30 June 2028	
2 September 2026	(England) Tobey Ugorji	30 June 2027	
16 November 2026	(England) Taha Elmansuri	30 June 2028	

== Appearances, goals and discipline ==
As of match played 21 November 2026
Numbers in parentheses denote appearances made as a substitute.
Players marked † left the club during the playing season.
Players with names in italics and marked * were on loan from another club for the whole of their season with Birmingham.
Players listed with no appearances have been in the matchday squad but only as unused substitutes.
Key to positions: GK – Goalkeeper; DF – Defender; MF – Midfielder; FW – Forward

Players' appearances, goals and discipline by competition
No.	Pos.	Nat.	Name	Championship		FA Cup		EFL Cup		Total		Discipline	
No.	Pos.	Nat.	Name	Apps	Goals	Apps	Goals	Apps	Goals	Apps	Goals	A yellow rectangle, denoting the yellow penalty card shown to a player being cautioned	A red rectangle, denoting the red penalty card shown to a player being sent off
1	GK	(England)	James Beadle	14+0	0	0+0	0	1+0	0	15+0	0	0	0
2	DF	(England)	Ethan Laird	4+8	0	0+0	0	0+1	0	4+9	0	2	0
3	DF	(England)	Lee Buchanan	0+0	0	0+0	0	0+1	0	0+1	0	0	0
4	DF	(Austria)	Christoph Klarer	16+0	0	0+0	0	2+0	0	18+0	0	4	0
5	DF	(Germany)	Phil Neumann	16+0	2	0+0	0	1+1	0	17+1	2	3	0
7	FW	(Spain)	Carlos Vicente	9+6	2	0+0	0	2+0	0	11+6	2	3	0
8	MF	(South Korea)	Paik Seung-ho	5+5	1	0+0	0	2+0	0	7+5	1	0	0
9	FW	(Denmark)	August Priske	12+0	6	0+0	0	1+1	1	13+1	7	1	0
10	FW	(Jamaica)	Demarai Gray	1+12	3	0+0	0	1+1	1	2+13	4	0	0
11	FW	(Scotland)	Scott Wright	0+0	0	0+0	0	0+1	0	0+1	0	0	0
14	MF	(Colombia)	Jhon Solís	13+0	0	0+0	0	2+0	0	15+0	0	4	0
16	FW	(England)	Patrick Roberts	8+5	0	0+0	0	0+0	0	8+5	0	1	0
17	FW	(Canada)	Liam Millar	12+0	4	0+0	0	0+0	0	12+0	4	1	0
18	MF	(England)	Max Bird	2+7	1	0+0	0	0+0	0	2+7	1	0	0
19	MF	(England)	Taylor Gardner-Hickman	0+3	0	0+0	0	0+0	0	0+3	0	0	0
20	DF	(England)	Alex Cochrane	15+1	2	0+0	0	1+1	0	16+2	2	4	0
21	GK	(England)	Ryan Allsop	2+1	0	0+0	0	1+0	0	3+1	0	0	0
23	DF	(England)	Dael Fry	0+2	0	0+0	0	1+0	0	1+2	0	0	0
24	MF	(Japan)	Tomoki Iwata	16+0	0	0+0	0	1+1	0	17+1	0	0	0
25	DF	(United States)	Kristoffer Lund	1+1	0	0+0	0	1+0	0	2+1	0	0	0
26	DF	(Nigeria)	Bright Osayi-Samuel	12+2	0	0+0	0	2+0	0	14+2	0	5	0
27	MF	(Japan)	Kanya Fujimoto	0+0	0	0+0	0	1+0	0	1+0	0	0	0
28	FW	(England)	Jay Stansfield	16+0	4	0+0	0	1+1	0	17+1	4	3	0
32	FW	(Argentina)	Luis Vázquez	2+11	0	0+0	0	1+1	0	3+12	0	2	0
33	FW	(Germany)	Marvin Ducksch	0+10	0	0+0	0	0+0	0	0+10	0	0	0

== Awards ==
=== Player awards ===
==== EFL Championship Player of the Month ====
Month	Player	Result	Ref.
October	(Denmark) August Priske	Nominated	

=== Manager awards ===
==== EFL Championship Player of the Month ====
Month	Manager	Result	Ref.
October	(Wales) Chris Davies	Nominated	
