= 2023–24 Birmingham City F.C. season =

Birmingham City
2023–24 season
- Owners: Birmingham Sports Holdings 75.00%; Oriental Rainbow 21.64%; (until 13 July 2023); Birmingham Sports Holdings 51.7%; Shelby Companies Ltd 45.96%; thereafter
- Chairman: Tom Wagner
- Manager: John Eustace (until 9 October 2023); Wayne Rooney; (11 October 2023 – 2 January 2024); Steve Spooner (interim); Tony Mowbray; (8 January – 19 February, when he took medical leave); Mark Venus (caretaker); Gary Rowett; (interim, 19 March – 5 May); Tony Mowbray (5–21 May); Chris Davies (from 6 June 2024)
- Stadium: St Andrew's
- Championship: 22nd (relegated)
- FA Cup: Fourth round (eliminated by Leicester City)
- EFL Cup: Second round (eliminated by Cardiff City)
- Top goalscorer: League: Jay Stansfield (12); All: Jay Stansfield (13)
- Highest home attendance: 27,680 (vs Norwich City, 4 May 2024)
- Lowest home attendance: 7,133 (vs Hull City, FA Cup, 16 January 2024)
- Average home league attendance: 21,180
Home colours	Away colours	Third colours

The 2023–24 season was Birmingham City Football Club's 121st season in the English football league system and 13th consecutive season in the second-tier EFL Championship. As with all members of the English Football League, the club's first team also competed in the FA Cup, in which they lost to Leicester City in the fourth round, and the EFL Cup, from which they were eliminated in the second round by Cardiff City.

In October, head coach John Eustace was sacked and replaced by Wayne Rooney as manager. Rooney was sacked on 2 January 2024. His successor, Tony Mowbray, stepped back from the role in February to undergo medical treatment, took formal medical leave on 19 March, and Gary Rowett rejoined the club as interim manager. Mowbray resigned on health grounds on 21 May. On 6 June, after "close to 1,000 coaches being evaluated and more than 40 being spoken to directly or through their representatives", Chris Davies, senior assistant coach under Ange Postecoglou at Tottenham Hotspur, was appointed manager on a four-year contract. It would be his first senior managerial role.

Birmingham ended the season with 50 points, which was not enough to save them from relegation to EFL League One. They finished 22nd in the 24-team table, one point behind Plymouth Argyle.

The season covers the period from 1 July 2023 to 30 June 2024.

== Background and pre-season ==
=== Takeover ===
A June 2022 attempt to purchase the club by a group fronted by former Watford F.C. owner Laurence Bassini, involving financier Keith Harris and with money reportedly loaned by David Sullivan, came to nothing. A consortium led by fashion industry businessman Paul Richardson and Argentine former footballer Maxi López announced in July that they were close to completing the purchase of a stake in the club, and later confirmed that they were providing operating funds, but pulled out in December citing a failure to agree revisions to the original terms of agreement. Richardson, López and their proposed chief executive, former Charlton Athletic chairman Matt Southall, were sanctioned by the EFL after admitting breaching regulations by taking effective control of the club without approval, and the club were deducted two points, suspended until the end of the 2023–24 season.

In April 2023, Birmingham Sports Holdings (BSH) confirmed letters of intent had been signed to sell 24% of Birmingham City plc shares held by themselves and the 21.64% owned by Oriental Rainbow, as well as the whole of Birmingham City Stadium Ltd, to Shelby Companies Ltd, a subsidiary of asset management company Knighthead Capital Management fronted by Tom Wagner, Knighthead's co-founder and co-CEO. EFL approval was forthcoming in early June, and Hong Kong Stock Exchange (HKSE) approval preceded BSH's extraordinary general meeting (EGM) on 13 July that voted overwhelmingly to accept the offer. Although BSH retained 51% of the shares, Wagner confirmed that Shelby were "responsible for the operations of the club moving forward" and that "nothing about the way the transaction is structured will prevent us from obtaining the long-term goals we have for the club." The club's new board of directors included Wagner as chairman, four Shelby appointments, two BSH appointments, and Garry Cook as CEO, and considerable media attention followed the arrival of seven-time Super Bowl-winner Tom Brady as minority owner and chair of the club's advisory board.

=== Stadium ===
Work began during the 2022–23 season to demolish and rebuild the lower tiers of the Kop and Tilton Road stands, which had remained closed since late 2020 because of what was initially described as the effect of water ingress on structural steelwork and eventually revealed to be asbestos-related damage. The works at the Tilton Road end, to include installation of rail seats to permit safe standing in the lower tier, were due to complete in September 2023, and the Kop was expected to fully re-open two months later. Work stopped after main contractors Buckingham Group filed for administration in mid-August, and resumed in mid-September under the management of Mace Consult, with completion expected by the end of November. The Championship fixture against West Bromwich Albion on 6 October was used as a test event, with 834 safe standing places available for use.

=== Transfers ===
Departures included Jobe Bellingham, the 17-year-old brother of England international Jude, who joined Sunderland for an undisclosed fee, and Tahith Chong, for whom Luton Town, newly promoted to the Premier League, paid a fee reported by BBC Sport as £4 million. The release of Harlee Dean, Maxime Colin, George Friend and Kevin Long and the departure of loanees Auston Trusty and Dion Sanderson left the team with only one senior defender, Marc Roberts. Long eventually opted to accept the offer of a new contract, but the first new arrivals were both attacking players: Leeds United and Wales forward Tyler Roberts, who joined for an undisclosed fee, and Japanese international attacking midfielder Koji Miyoshi, who was out of contract at Royal Antwerp. Defensive midfielder Krystian Bielik joined Birmingham for the third time, this time on a three-year permanent contract, and Ethan Laird, a 21-year-old right back, signed from Manchester United, also on a three-year deal. winger Siriki Dembélé arrived from AFC Bournemouth on a three-year deal to replace Chong, Sanderson returned on a four-year contract and was named captain, Werder Bremen's England under-21 left-back Lee Buchanan signed a five-year deal, and after several weeks on trial, former Blackpool forward Keshi Anderson was given a 12-month contract. Later in the window, Fulham forward Jay Stansfield arrived on loan for the season, and there were three more late additions on season-long loans: Austrian defender Emanuel Aiwu from Cremonese, Cody Drameh, a right back from Leeds United, and another Werder Bremen player, Scotland international winger or forward Oliver Burke. Forward Sam Cosgrove was released from his contract to join Barnsley on a free transfer.

=== On the field ===
After the second edition of the Arthur Cup, a match against Solihull Moors in aid of children's charities in memory of Arthur Labinjo-Hughes, the team had a week's training camp in Murcia, Spain, to include a friendly against Segunda División team FC Cartagena. On their return, the club played domestic friendlies away to League One clubs Northampton Town, Cheltenham Town and Peterborough United, a match at which Peterborough's director of football and a former Birmingham manager, Barry Fry, was honoured by the Football Association in recognition of his 50 years' service to the game.

The 2023–24 home kit, supplied by Nike, consists of a royal blue shirt with a navy wave graphic pattern and trim, royal blue shorts and white socks, while the away kit has a red shirt with a black graphic pattern and trim, black shorts and red socks. Both carry the logo of the club's principal partner, streetwear company Undefeated.

Pre-season friendly match details
Date	Opponents	Venue	Result	Score F–A	Scorer(s)	Attendance	Ref.
8 July 2023	Solihull Moors	A	W	1–0	Jutkiewicz 30'	3,633	
14 July 2023	FC Cartagena	N	W	2–1	James 5', T.Roberts 34'		
19 July 2023	Northampton Town	A	W	1–0	James 30'	2,540	
22 July 2023	Cheltenham Town	A	W	3–2	Anderson 25', James 35', Bacuna 41'	2,581	
29 July 2023	Peterborough United	A	L	2–3	Hogan 34', Jutkiewicz 90'		

== EFL Championship ==
=== August–October ===
Head coach John Eustace had regularly used a 5–3–2 formation during the 2022–23 season, but began the 2023–24 campaign away to Swansea City with a back four – Ethan Laird at right back, Dion Sanderson and Kevin Long in the centre of defence, and Lee Buchanan on the left – in front of John Ruddy in goal and shielded by Krystian Bielik and Ivan Šunjić in defensive midfield. In attack, Tyler Roberts and Siriki Dembélé occupied the wings and Keshi Anderson played in the centre behind striker Scott Hogan in a 4–2–3–1. Birmingham looked more dangerous in the first half but did not score until just before half-time, after a goalkeeping error allowed Anderson to set up Dembélé's tidy finish. Oakley replaced the injured Laird in the second half, and soon afterwards, Swansea attacked down their left and equalised. Near the end, it took a fine save to prevent Šunjić regaining the lead.

Before the first home game of the season, a 20,451 sell-out against Leeds United, minority owner and seven-time Super Bowl winner Tom Brady together with new chairman Tom Wagner visited two local pubs and spoke to the players in the dressing-room. Ahead of kick-off, Jasper Carrott read an emotional tribute to club legend Trevor Francis, who had died in July. There was one team change: Juninho Bacuna, who had scored both goals in the EFL Cup win earlier in the week, replaced the injured Roberts. The first half was dull, the second less so. Both sides should have scored before Birmingham did: in stoppage time, Daniel James ran into Laird in the penalty area, and Lukas Jutkiewicz converted the kick, albeit via goalkeeper Illan Meslier's foot. The starting eleven was unchanged for the visit to Bristol City. Koji Miyoshi replaced the injured Laird after 40 minutes and opened the scoring just before the break with a volley into the top corner of the net. Bristol's Rob Dickie was sent off for a second yellow card, but his side should have equalised when Nahki Wells missed an easy chance. Birmingham made the score 2–0 after Šunjić's cross was steered home by Jutkiewicz.

At home to newly promoted Plymouth Argyle, Miyoshi and Jordan James replaced the injured Laird and Dembélé and Bacuna switched to right back. Anderson crossed for Hogan's first goal of the season after 8 minutes, but Plymouth's second-half pressure produced a 60th-minute equaliser. In stoppage time, Bacuna headed off the line with Ruddy beaten, and then – according to the Championship Goal of the Month nomination – "less than 30 minutes into his Birmingham debut, Stansfield latched onto a through ball, deftly lifted it beyond a defender and lashed a rising thunderbolt of a shot into the roof of the net." He lost out on the award to Cardiff City's Aaron Ramsey, but preserved Birmingham's unbeaten record, earning Eustace a nomination – also unsuccessful – for the Championship Manager of the Month award.

=== First change of management ===
On 9 October, with the team sixth in the table, John Eustace was sacked as head coach. The board's statement began:

It is essential that the Board of Directors and the football management are fully aligned on the importance of implementing a winning mentality and a culture of ambition across the entire Football Club. With this in mind, Birmingham City has today parted company with Head Coach, John Eustace.

and continued:

A new First Team Manager will be announced in the coming days who will be responsible for creating an identity and clear 'no fear' playing style that all Birmingham City teams will adopt and embrace.

His assistants, Keith Downing and Matt Gardiner, left the following day. Former England international player and D.C. United head coach Wayne Rooney was appointed manager on 11 October. His coaching staff included Ashley Cole, John O'Shea, Carl Robinson and former Birmingham City scout and analyst Pete Shuttleworth; Maik Taylor remained as goalkeeping coach.

=== Second change of management ===
After 15 matches – 2 wins, 4 draws, and 9 losses – with Birmingham 20th in the table, Rooney was sacked and Robinson also left. The club stated that:

Despite their best efforts, results have not met the expectations that were made clear at the outset. Therefore, the Board feels that a change in management is in the best interests of the Football Club.

Rooney himself stated:

Football is a results business – and I recognise they have not been at the level I wanted them to be. However, time is the most precious commodity a manager requires and I do not believe 13 weeks was sufficient to oversee the changes that were needed.

Professional development coach Steve Spooner took over on an interim basis, to be supported by the remaining backroom staff. He took charge of the FA Cup third round draw at Hull City, before Tony Mowbray was appointed manager on 8 January, with Mark Venus as his assistant.

After eight matches in charge, Mowbray stepped back from the role in February to undergo medical treatment for an estimated six- to eight-week period. Venus took over the team with immediate effect, but Birmingham secured just one point during the next month and were above the relegation zone only on goal difference. On 19 March, Mowbray took formal medical leave, with his return scheduled for the beginning of 2024–25 pre-season, Venus was granted leave for a similar period, and Gary Rowett rejoined the club as interim manager for the last eight games of the season. The team gained 11 points from those matches, which was not enough to save them from relegation to League One after 29 seasons at a higher level.

=== League table ===
Pos	Team	Pld	W	D	L	GF	GA	GD	Pts	Promotion, qualification or relegation
19	Blackburn Rovers	46	14	11	21	60	74	−14	53	
20	Sheffield Wednesday	46	15	8	23	44	68	−24	53	
21	Plymouth Argyle	46	13	12	21	59	70	−11	51	
22	Birmingham City (R)	46	13	11	22	50	65	−15	50	Relegated to EFL League One
23	Huddersfield Town (R)	46	9	18	19	48	77	−29	45	Relegated to EFL League One
24	Rotherham United (R)	46	5	12	29	37	89	−52	27	Relegated to EFL League One

Source: EFL official website
Rules for classification: 1) Points; 2) Goal difference; 3) Number of goals scored; 4) Head-to-head results; 5) Wins; 6) Away goals; 7) Penalty points (sec 9.5); 8) Number of 12-point sending off offences; 9) Play-off (only if needed to determine promotion/relegation)
(R) Relegated

=== Results summary ===
Overall								Home						Away					
Pld	W	D	L	GF	GA	GD	Pts	W	D	L	GF	GA	GD	W	D	L	GF	GA	GD
46	13	11	22	50	65	−15	50	10	6	7	31	25	+6	3	5	15	19	40	−21

Last updated: end of 2023–24 season.

=== Match results ===
EFL Championship match details
Date	League position	Opponents	Venue	Result	Score F–A	Scorer(s)	Attendance	Ref.
5 August 2023	8th	Swansea City	A	D	1–1	Dembélé 45'	18,051	
12 August 2023	9th	Leeds United	H	W	1–0	Jutkiewicz 90+1' (pen.)	20,451	
19 August 2023	3rd	Bristol City	A	W	2–0	Miyoshi 45+3', Jutkiewicz 84'	22,397	
26 August 2023	3rd	Plymouth Argyle	H	W	2–1	Hogan 8', Stansfield 90+5'	20,685	
2 September 2023	4th	Millwall	H	D	1–1	Stansfield 53'	18,710	
16 September 2023	6th	Watford	A	L	0–2		18,932	
19 September 2023	7th	Preston North End	A	L	1–2	Stansfield 46'	15,838	
22 September 2023	8th	Queens Park Rangers	H	D	0–0		19,803	
30 September 2023	12th	Norwich City	A	L	0–2		26,231	
3 October 2023	10th	Huddersfield Town	H	W	4–1	Dembélé (2) 3', 64', Miyoshi 23', James 90+5'	15,944	
6 October 2023	5th	West Bromwich Albion	H	W	3–1	Bacuna 23' (pen.), Sanderson 38', Gardner 87'	21,495	
21 October 2023	7th	Middlesbrough	A	L	0–1		28,449	
25 October 2023	12th	Hull City	H	L	0–2		19,530	
28 October 2023	14th	Southampton	A	L	1–3	Stansfield 58'	28,924	
4 November 2023	14th	Ipswich Town	H	D	2–2	Stansfield 13', Burgess 51' (o.g.)	20,940	
11 November 2023	18th	Sunderland	A	L	1–3	Miyoshi 30'	40,922	
25 November 2023	14th	Sheffield Wednesday	H	W	2–1	Bacuna 45+3', James 81'	20,941	
29 November 2023	16th	Blackburn Rovers	A	L	2–4	Dembélé 63', 78'	12,693	
2 December 2023	15th	Rotherham United	H	D	0–0		18,160	
8 December 2023	16th	Coventry City	A	L	0–2		26,729	
13 December 2023	16th	Cardiff City	A	W	1–0	Bacuna 45+3'	17,669	
18 December 2023	17th	Leicester City	H	L	2–3	James (2) 14', 74'	20,334	
23 December 2023	18th	Plymouth Argyle	A	D	3–3	Stansfield 15', James 39', Bacuna 62'	16,589	
26 December 2023	19th	Stoke City	H	L	1–3	Stansfield 69'	21,640	
29 December 2023	20th	Bristol City	H	D	0–0		21,231	
1 January 2024	20th	Leeds United	A	L	0–3		36,086	
13 January 2024	20th	Swansea City	H	D	2–2	Dembélé 38', James 90+5'	21,116	
20 January 2024	20th	Stoke City	A	W	2–1	Stansfield 10', Bacuna 49'	25,058	
3 February 2024	19th	West Bromwich Albion	A	L	0–1		25,235	
9 February 2024	19th	Sheffield Wednesday	A	L	0–2		25,431	
13 February 2024	18th	Blackburn Rovers	H	W	1–0	Dozzell 77'	18,117	
17 February 2024	15th	Sunderland	H	W	2–1	James 60', Miyoshi 80'	27,449	
24 February 2024	18th	Ipswich Town	A	L	1–3	James 45+1'	29,363	
2 March 2024	20th	Southampton	H	L	3–4	Miyoshi 2', Stansfield 41', Bacuna 77'	21,611	
5 March 2024	19th	Hull City	A	D	1–1	Jutkiewicz 82'	20,398	
9 March 2024	21st	Millwall	A	L	0–1		17,008	
12 March 2024	21st	Middlesbrough	H	L	0–1		17,829	
16 March 2024	21st	Watford	H	L	0–1		21,266	
29 March 2024	21st	Queens Park Rangers	A	L	1–2	Bacuna 62'	17,170	
1 April 2024	20th	Preston North End	H	W	1–0	Stansfield 68'	24,511	
6 April 2024	22nd	Leicester City	A	L	1–2	Stansfield 45'	31,825	
10 April 2024	23rd	Cardiff City	H	L	0–1		20,894	
13 April 2024	21st	Coventry City	H	W	3–0	Thomas 12' (o.g.), Šunjić 41', Stansfield 59'	26,811	
20 April 2024	21st	Rotherham United	A	D	0–0		11,001	
27 April 2024	22nd	Huddersfield Town	A	D	1–1	Miyoshi 45'	22,001	
4 May 2024	22nd	Norwich City	H	W	1–0	Paik 55'	27,680	

== FA Cup ==
As with all teams in the top two divisions, Birmingham entered the competition in the third round, in which they were drawn away to Championship rivals Hull City. The team was managed by professional development coach Steve Spooner, who was named interim manager after Rooney's dismissal. He made seven changes from the starting eleven in Rooney's last match, but still selected a strong side, with Kevin Long returning to centre-half after lengthy injury. Jutkiewicz scored with a diving header after 18 minutes, but Matty Jacob reacted first to Neil Etheridge's failure to hold Aaron Connolly's 87th-minute shot and equalised.

FA Cup match details
Round	Date	Opponents	Venue	Result	Score F–A	Scorers	Attendance	Refs
Third round	6 January 2024	Hull City	A	D	1–1	Jutkiewicz 18'	12,200	
Third round replay	16 January 2024	Hull City	H	W	2–1	Stansfield 66', Miyoshi 90+3'	7,133	
Fourth round	27 January 2024	Leicester City	A	L	0–3		28,396	

== EFL Cup ==
In the first round, Birmingham won 2–0 away to League One club Cheltenham Town. Juninho Bacuna scored both goals, a deflected shot after 24 minutes and a free kick from distance 8 minutes later. When he came on as a second-half substitute, the 18-year-old Brandon Khela became the first British South Asian to play for Birmingham's men's first team. They were drawn at home to Cardiff City in the second round.

EFL Cup match details
Round	Date	Opponents	Venue	Result	Score F–A	Scorers	Attendance	Refs
First round	8 August 2023	Cheltenham Town	A	W	0–2	Bacuna 24', 32'	4,026	
Second round	29 August 2023	Cardiff City	H	L	1–3	Hogan 70'	11,405	

== Transfers ==
For those players sold, released, or whose contract ended before the start of this season, i.e. those whose contracts ended on 30 June 2023 or before, see 2022–23 Birmingham City F.C. season.

=== In ===
Date	Player	Club †	Fee	Ref.
21 June 2023	Tyler Roberts	Leeds United	Undisclosed	
29 June 2023	Krystian Bielik	Derby County	Undisclosed	
1 July 2023	Ethan Laird	Manchester United	Undisclosed	
1 July 2023	Koji Miyoshi	(Royal Antwerp)	Out of contract	
14 July 2023	Siriki Dembélé	AFC Bournemouth	Undisclosed	
15 July 2023	Dion Sanderson	Wolverhampton Wanderers	Undisclosed	
22 July 2023	Keshi Anderson	(Blackpool)	Out of contract	
26 July 2023	Lee Buchanan	Werder Bremen	Undisclosed	
4 September 2023	Sahid Kamara *	(Charlton Athletic)	Out of contract	
29 January 2024	Paik Seung-ho	Jeonbuk Hyundai Motors	Undisclosed	
1 February 2024	Alex Pritchard	Sunderland	Undisclosed	

† Brackets round a club's name indicate the player's contract with that club had expired before he joined Birmingham.
* Signed primarily for the development squad

==== Loaned in ====
Date	Player	Club	Return	Ref.
24 August 2023	Jay Stansfield	Fulham	End of season	
31 August 2023	Emanuel Aiwu	Cremonese	End of season	
1 September 2023	Oliver Burke	Werder Bremen	End of season	
1 September 2023	Cody Drameh	Leeds United	End of season	
19 January 2024	Andre Dozzell	Queens Park Rangers	End of season	

=== Out ===
Date	Player	Club †	Fee	Ref.
13 July 2023	Tahith Chong	Luton Town	Undisclosed	
1 September 2023	Sam Cosgrove	(Barnsley)	Released	
1 February 2024	Josh Andrews	Gillingham	Undisclosed	
1 February 2024	Zach Jeacock	(Lincoln City)	Mutual consent	
2 February 2024	Nico Gordon	North Texas	Undisclosed	
20 February 2024	Kevin Long	Toronto FC	Undisclosed	
30 June 2024	Oliver Basey	(Gateshead)	Released	
30 June 2024	Rico Browne	(Walsall)	Compensation	
30 June 2024	Tate Campbell	(Hereford)	Released	
30 June 2024	Morgan Dance		Released	
30 June 2024	Neil Etheridge	(Buriram United)	Released	
30 June 2024	Scott Hogan		Released	
30 June 2024	Marcel Oakley		Released	
30 June 2024	Rico Patterson	(Aberystwyth Town)	Released	
30 June 2024	Marc Roberts	(Barnsley)	Released	
30 June 2024	John Ruddy	(Newcastle United)	Contract expired	
30 June 2024	Callum Sullivan	(Alvechurch)	Released	
30 June 2024	Ivan Šunjić	(Pafos)	Released	
30 June 2024	Finley Thorndike	(Glentoran)	Released	
30 June 2024	Kieran Wakefield	(Alvechurch)	Released	
30 June 2024	Pharrell Williams		Released	

† Brackets round a club's name denote the player joined that club after his Birmingham City contract expired.

==== Loaned out ====
Date	Player	Club	Return	Ref.
21 July 2023	Nico Gordon	Solihull Moors	End of season, recalled 8 January 2024	
22 July 2023	Josh Andrews	Accrington Stanley	End of season, recalled 1 February 2024	
28 July 2023	Tate Campbell	Bromley	End of season	
15 August 2023	Zach Jeacock	Gloucester City	31 January 2024	
25 August 2023	Finley Thorndike	Boston United	End of season, recalled January 2024	
1 September 2023	Josh Williams	Cheltenham Town	1 January 2024	
2 November 2023	Ben Beresford	Gloucester City	One month, extended to end of season, recalled 22 March 2024	
10 November 2023	Callum Sullivan	Rushall Olympic	One month, extended to end of season	
28 December 2023	Rico Browne	Rushall Olympic	19 January 2023, extended to end of season	
12 January 2024	Brandon Khela	Ross County	End of season	
31 January 2024	Tommy Fogarty	Ebbsfleet United	End of season	
1 February 2024	Oliver Basey	Aberystwyth Town	22 April 2024	
1 February 2024	Rico Patterson	Rushall Olympic	End of season	
23 March 2024	Ben Beresford	Banbury United	End of season	
26 March 2024	Finley Thorndike	Alvechurch	End of season	

== Appearances and goals ==
Numbers in parentheses denote appearances made as a substitute.
Players marked † left the club during the playing season.
Players with names in italics and marked * were on loan from another club for the whole of their season with Birmingham.
Players listed with no appearances have been in the matchday squad but only as unused substitutes.
Key to positions: GK – Goalkeeper; DF – Defender; MF – Midfielder; FW – Forward

Players' appearances and goals by competition
No.	Pos.	Nat.	Name	League		FA Cup		EFL Cup		Total		Discipline	
No.	Pos.	Nat.	Name	Apps	Goals	Apps	Goals	Apps	Goals	Apps	Goals	A yellow rectangle, denoting the yellow penalty card shown to a player being cautioned	A red rectangle, denoting the red penalty card shown to a player being sent off
1	GK	PHI	Neil Etheridge	2	0	1	0	2	0	5	0	1	0
2	DF	ENG	Ethan Laird	25	0	1	0	0	0	26	0	7	0
3	DF	ENG	Lee Buchanan	32	0	3	0	0	0	35	0	7	1
4	DF	ENG	Marc Roberts	10 (4)	0	0 (1)	0	0 (1)	0	10 (6)	0	1	0
5	DF	ENG	Dion Sanderson	37	1	1	0	2	0	40	1	3	1
6	MF	POL	Krystian Bielik	35 (1)	0	3	0	0	0	38 (1)	0	13	1
7	MF	CUR	Juninho Bacuna	31 (14)	7	1	0	2	2	34 (14)	9	9	0
8	FW	WAL	Tyler Roberts	8 (9)	0	0 (2)	0	0	0	8 (11)	0	3	0
9	FW	IRL	Scott Hogan	11 (15)	1	0 (2)	0	0 (1)	1	11 (18)	2	1	0
10	FW	ENG	Lukas Jutkiewicz	3 (25)	3	1	1	2	0	6 (25)	4	2	1
11	MF	JPN	Koji Miyoshi	29 (14)	6	2 (1)	1	1 (1)	0	32 (16)	7	5	0
12	DF	ENG	Cody Drameh *	23 (5)	0	2	0	0	0	25 (5)	0	2	0
13	MF	KOR	Paik Seung-ho	15 (3)	1	0	0	0	0	15 (3)	1	1	0
14	FW	ENG	Keshi Anderson	12 (8)	0	2 (1)	0	1	0	15 (9)	0	2	0
15	MF	ENG	Alfie Chang	0	0	0	0	1	0	1	0	0	0
16	FW	ENG	Sam Cosgrove †	0	0	0	0	0 (2)	0	0 (2)	0	1	0
16	MF	ENG	Andre Dozzell *	8 (2)	1	0	0	0	0	8 (2)	1	1	0
17	FW	SCO	Siriki Dembélé	23 (10)	6	2 (1)	0	0 (1)	0	25 (12)	6	5	0
18	DF	ENG	Josh Williams	0	0	0	0	0	0	0	0	0	0
19	MF	WAL	Jordan James	25 (17)	8	2 (1)	0	2	0	29 (18)	8	12	0
20	MF	ENG	Gary Gardner	1 (15)	1	2	0	0 (2)	0	3 (16)	1	1	0
21	GK	ENG	John Ruddy	44	0	2	0	0	0	46	0	2	0
23	DF	ENG	Manny Longelo	10 (7)	0	1	0	2	0	13 (7)	0	4	0
24	DF	ENG	Marcel Oakley	0 (2)	0	0	0	2	0	2 (2)	0	1	0
26	DF	IRL	Kevin Long †	16 (1)	0	1	0	2	0	19 (1)	0	3	0
27	MF	ENG	Brandon Khela	0 (1)	0	0	0	0 (1)	0	0 (2)	0	0	0
28	FW	ENG	Jay Stansfield *	39 (4)	12	2 (1)	1	1	0	42 (5)	13	11	0
29	MF	ENG	Alex Pritchard	3 (6)	0	0	0	0	0	3 (6)	0	0	0
34	MF	CRO	Ivan Šunjić	31 (5)	1	1 (1)	0	1 (1)	0	33 (7)	1	11	0
35	MF	ENG	George Hall	0 (8)	0	0	0	1	0	1 (8)	0	0	0
38	GK	ENG	Zach Jeacock †	0	0	0	0	0	0	0	0	0	0
43	FW	ENG	Junior Dixon	0	0	0	0	0	0	0	0	0	0
44	DF	AUT	Emanuel Aiwu *	22 (2)	0	1	0	0	0	23 (2)	0	4	0
45	FW	SCO	Oliver Burke *	11 (10)	0	1 (1)	0	0	0	12 (11)	0	0	0
47	MF	ENG	Josh Home	0	0	0	0	0	0	0	0	0	0
48	GK	ENG	Brad Mayo	0	0	0	0	0	0	0	0	0	0
49	MF	ENG	Romelle Donovan	1 (6)	0	1 (2)	0	0	0	2 (8)	0	0	0

Players not included in matchday squads
No.	Pos.	Nat.	Name
25	DF	MSR	Nico Gordon †
30	MF	ENG	Tate Campbell
