= Lee Buchanan (footballer) =

English footballer (born 2001)

Personal information
- Full name: Lee David Buchanan
- Date of birth: 7 March 2001 (age 25)
- Place of birth: Mansfield, England
- Height: 5 ft 9 in (1.75 m)
- Position: Left-back

Team information
- Current team: Birmingham City
- Number: 3

Youth career
- 2010–2019: Derby County

Senior career*
Years	Team	Apps	(Gls)
2019–2022	Derby County	70	(0)
2022–2023	Werder Bremen	21	(1)
2023–	Birmingham City	35	(1)

International career
2019	England U19	3	(0)
2020–2021	England U20	2	(0)
2020	England U21	2	(0)
- * Club domestic league appearances and goals as of 10:06, 30 December 2024 (UTC)

Lee David Buchanan (born 7 March 2001) is an English professional footballer who plays as a left back for EFL Championship club Birmingham City. He began his career with Derby County, coming through the youth ranks to make 70 EFL appearances, spent the 2022–23 season with Bundesliga club Werder Bremen, and joined Birmingham City in 2023. He has represented England internationally at under-19, under-20 and under-21 levels.

== Club career ==
=== Derby County ===
On 12 August 2019, Buchanan made his professional debut with Derby County in the EFL Cup against Scunthorpe United. He scored the only goal of the game in the 78th minute to take Derby through to the second round. He made his league debut on 24 August 2019, starting in the 1–1 draw against West Bromwich Albion, playing the entire 90 minutes.

On 31 July 2020, Buchanan signed a two-year contract until the summer of 2022. A further one-year contract extension clause was triggered at the end of the 2021-22 season.

In July 2022, Buchanan cancelled his contract with Derby County without the club’s consent following the club’s exit from administration. This was permitted under UK employment law relating to the Transfer of Undertakings (Protection of Employment) Regulations (TUPE), which apply when employees transfer to a new employer.

=== Werder Bremen ===
In July 2022 Buchanan joined Werder Bremen, newly promoted to the Bundesliga, on a free transfer from Derby County. After a legal loophole allowed Buchanan out of his contract following the sale of Derby County, Derby would not be entitled to any compensation for the transfer, with them asking for a FIFA tribunal in order to receive a fee. On 29 July, it was confirmed that Derby would receive "full training compensation", understood to be a six-figure sum.

Buchanan's first goal came on 20 August 2022 away to Borussia Dortmund, in the 89th minute, with his side 2–0 down, after which Niklas Schmidt and Oliver Burke completed an unlikely 3–2 victory. He made 23 appearances in all competitions in the 2022–23 season, and began the following pre-season with the first-team squad, but was released from the training camp on 25 July 2023 for final talks and a medical with another club. According to director of football Clemens Fritz, he had "been dissatisfied with the amount of game time and expressed his desire for a change."

=== Birmingham City ===
On 26 July 2023, Buchanan signed a five-year contract with EFL Championship club Birmingham City. The fee was undisclosed, but was reported in Bremen as €1.5 million. During his first season at Birmingham City, Buchanan featured regularly, making 35 league appearances as the club were relegated from the Championship.

Ahead of the 2024–25 campaign, Buchanan sustained a calf injury in pre-season, which kept him sidelined for several months. Shortly after returning to first-team action, he suffered a serious knee injury during a 0–0 draw with Blackpool, later confirmed to be an anterior cruciate ligament rupture, ruling him out for the remainder of the season. The injury meant Buchanan missed the majority of Birmingham’s League One title-winning campaign while undergoing surgery and rehabilitation.

== International career ==
On 30 August 2019, Buchanan received his first international call up as a member of the England U19s squad and eventually made his debut for that age group during a 3–1 defeat to France in Marbella on 9 October 2019.

On 13 October 2020, he made his debut for the England U20s during a 2–0 victory over Wales at St George's Park.

In November 2020, Buchanan received his first call-up to the England U21s in November 2020. He made his U21 debut as a late substitute during a 3–1 win over Andorra U21s at Molineux on 13 November.

== Career statistics ==
As of match played 8 August 2026

Appearances and goals by club, season and competition
Club	Season	League			National cup (Note: Includes FA Cup, DFB-Pokal)		League cup (Note: Includes EFL Cup)		Other		Total	
Club	Season	Division	Apps	Goals	Apps	Goals	Apps	Goals	Apps	Goals	Apps	Goals
Derby County	2019–20	Championship	5	0	0	0	2	1	—		7	1
Derby County	2020–21	Championship	35	0	0	0	2	0	—		37	0
Derby County	2021–22	Championship	30	0	0	0	1	0	—		31	0
Derby County	Total		70	0	0	0	5	1	—		75	1
Werder Bremen	2022–23	Bundesliga	21	1	3	0	0	0	—		24	1
Birmingham City	2023–24	Championship	32	0	3	0	0	0	—		35	0
Birmingham City	2024–25	League One	3	1	0	0	0	0	1 (Note: Appearance in EFL Trophy)	0	4	1
Birmingham City	2025–26	Championship	0	0	0	0	0	0	—		0	0
Birmingham City	2026–27	Championship	0	0	0	0	1	0	—		1	0
Birmingham City	Total		35	1	3	0	1	0	1	0	40	1
Career total			126	2	6	0	6	1	1	0	139	3

== Honours ==
Individual

- Bundesliga Rookie of the Month: August 2022
