= Jay Stansfield =

English footballer (born 2002)

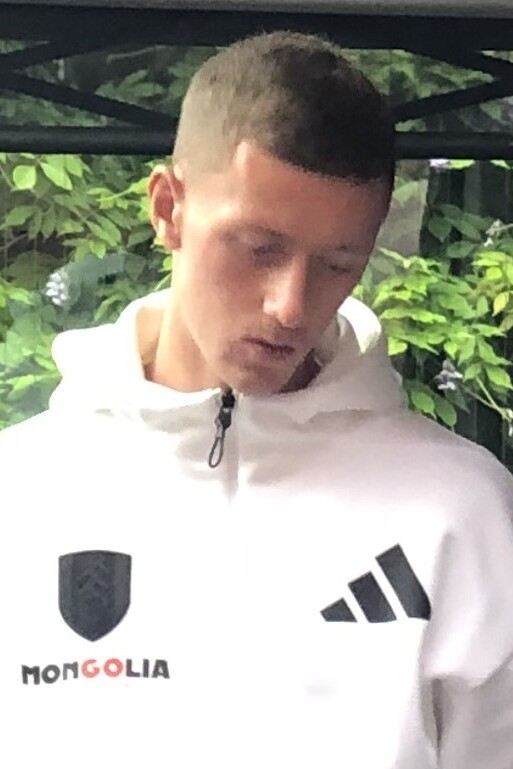
- Stansfield with Fulham in 2024

Personal information
- Full name: Jay Stansfield
- Date of birth: 24 November 2002 (age 23)
- Place of birth: Tiverton, England
- Height: 1.78 m (5 ft 10 in)
- Position: Forward

Team information
- Current team: Birmingham City
- Number: 28

Youth career
- –2019: Exeter City
- 2019–2020: Fulham

Senior career*
Years	Team	Apps	(Gls)
2020–2024	Fulham	6	(0)
2022–2023	→ Exeter City (loan)	36	(9)
2023–2024	→ Birmingham City (loan)	43	(12)
2024–	Birmingham City	96	(33)

International career^{‡}
2019	England U18	3	(0)
2021–2022	England U20	5	(1)
2023–2025	England U21	9	(0)
Medal record
Men's football
Representing England
UEFA European Under-21 Championship
Winner	2025 Slovakia
- * Club domestic league appearances and goals as of 21:59, 28 August 2026 (UTC) ‡ National team caps and goals as of 19:14, 29 June 2025 (UTC)

Jay Stansfield (born 24 November 2002) is an English professional footballer who plays as a forward for EFL Championship club Birmingham City. He began his football career with Exeter City, joined Fulham as a 16-year-old, and spent the 2022–23 season on loan at Exeter City. He has represented England at under-18, under-20 and under-21 levels.

== Club career ==
=== Fulham ===
Son of former Yeovil Town, Hereford United and Exeter City footballer Adam Stansfield, he began his footballing career in the academy of Exeter City. In August 2019, Stansfield signed for Championship side Fulham for an undisclosed fee. On 4 January 2020, Stansfield made his debut for Fulham in an FA Cup third round match against Aston Villa, coming on in the 82nd minute for Josh Onomah. Later that month, he made his league debut as an 88th-minute substitute in Fulham's EFL Championship match away at Charlton Athletic, again replacing Josh Onomah. He scored his first goal for the club with his backside in the 26th minute of Fulham's EFL Cup tie against Birmingham City on 24 August 2021.

==== Loan to Exeter City ====
On 2 September 2022, Stansfield returned to his boyhood club, Exeter City, on a season-long loan. Stansfield made his Exeter debut on 3 September as a 79th minute substitute in a 1–0 victory over MK Dons. He wore the no. 9 shirt, which had previously been retired after the previous holder, his father, Adam Stansfield, died of cancer in 2010. A run of four goals and two assists saw Stansfield win the EFL Young Player of the Month award for October 2022. Stansfield completed his first career hat-trick, whilst wearing his dad's number 9 shirt, scoring all three goals in a 3–2 home victory for the Grecians against Morecambe in the final game of the EFL League One season. This also was his last game on loan for Exeter City.

=== Birmingham City ===
Stansfield signed for Championship club Birmingham City on 24 August 2023 on loan for the 2023–24 season. Stansfield received the club's Player of the Season award.

On 30 August 2024, Stansfield signed permanently at Birmingham City for a reported £15 million (rising to £20 million with incentives), a record deal for a club in EFL League One. That season Stansfield scored a goal for Birmingham in their EFL Trophy semi-final victory over Bradford City and then started in the 2025 EFL Trophy final at Wembley Stadium which they lost against Peterborough United to finish runners up. He scored 19 goals in their league campaign as Birmingham finished champions and were promoted back to the EFL Championship. The club earned triple-digit points and he was one of their seven members to be selected for the PFA Team of the Year 2025.

== International career ==
Having represented England at under-18 level, Stansfield made his under-20 debut on 7 October 2021 during a 1–1 draw with Italy at SMH Group Stadium in Chesterfield.

After Rico Lewis and Cole Palmer were moved up to the England senior squad because of injury withdrawals, Stansfield was added to the under-21 squad for European Championship qualifiers against Serbia and Northern Ireland in November 2023. He came on against Serbia on 18 November, replacing Liam Delap after 67 minutes, and twice came close to scoring, first with a turn and shot that hit the post and then with a shot that was blocked. He started against Northern Ireland, and played 71 minutes in a 3–0 win.

Stansfield was again called up for qualifiers in March 2024; he was an unused substitute against Azerbaijan, and played 62 minutes without scoring in a 7–0 win against Luxembourg. He was included in the squad for the 2025 UEFA European Under-21 Championship and started in the final as England defeated Germany 3–2 after extra time to win the tournament.

== Career statistics ==
As of match played 5 September 2026

Appearances and goals by club, season and competition
Club	Season	League			FA Cup		EFL Cup		Other		Total	
Club	Season	Division	Apps	Goals	Apps	Goals	Apps	Goals	Apps	Goals	Apps	Goals
Fulham	2019–20	Championship	1	0	1	0	0	0	0	0	2	0
Fulham	2020–21	Premier League	0	0	0	0	0	0	—		0	0
Fulham	2021–22	Championship	1	0	0	0	1	1	—		2	1
Fulham	2022–23	Premier League	3	0	0	0	1	0	—		4	0
Fulham	2023–24	Premier League	0	0	—		—		—		0	0
Fulham	2024–25	Premier League	1	0	—		1	1	—		2	1
Fulham	Total		6	0	1	0	3	2	0	0	10	2
Fulham U23	2020–21	—			—		—		1 (Note: Appearance(s) in EFL Trophy)	0	1	0
Exeter City (loan)	2022–23	League One	36	9	2	0	—		1	0	39	9
Birmingham City (loan)	2023–24	Championship	43	12	3	1	1	0	—		47	13
Birmingham City	2024–25	League One	37	19	2	0	—		5	4	44	23
Birmingham City	2025–26	Championship	44	10	1	0	2	1	—		47	11
Birmingham City	2026–27	Championship	15	4	0	0	2	0	—		17	4
Birmingham City	Total		139	45	3	0	4	1	5	4	155	51
Career total			181	54	9	1	8	3	7	4	205	62

== Honours ==
Birmingham City

- EFL League One: 2024–25
- EFL Trophy runner-up: 2024–25

England U21

- UEFA European Under-21 Championship: 2025

Individual

- EFL Young Player of the Month: October 2022
- Birmingham City Player of the Year: 2023–24
- PFA Team of the Year: 2024–25 League One
