= Ethan Laird =

English footballer (born 2001)

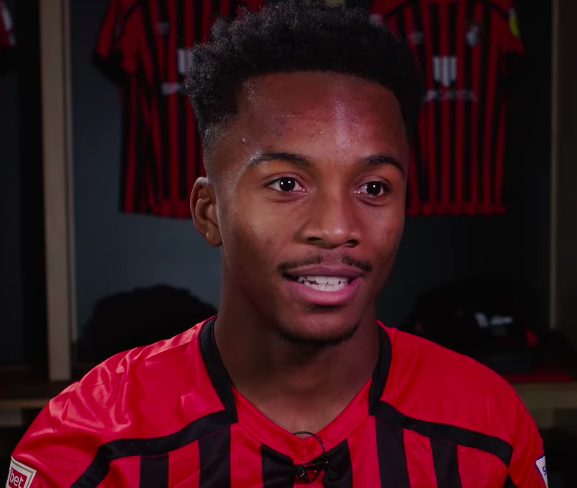
- Laird with AFC Bournemouth in 2022

Personal information
- Full name: Ethan Benjamin Laird
- Date of birth: 5 August 2001 (age 25)
- Place of birth: Basingstoke, England
- Height: 5 ft 10 in (1.77 m)
- Position: Right-back

Team information
- Current team: Birmingham City
- Number: 2

Youth career
- –2019: Manchester United

Senior career*
Years	Team	Apps	(Gls)
2019–2023	Manchester United	0	(0)
2021	→ Milton Keynes Dons (loan)	24	(0)
2021–2022	→ Swansea City (loan)	20	(0)
2022	→ AFC Bournemouth (loan)	6	(0)
2022–2023	→ Queens Park Rangers (loan)	32	(1)
2023–	Birmingham City	87	(4)

International career
2017–2018	England U17	5	(0)
2018–2019	England U18	7	(2)
2019	England U19	3	(1)
- * Club domestic league appearances and goals as of 14:51, 14 October 2026 (UTC)

Ethan Benjamin Laird (born 5 August 2001) is an English professional footballer who plays as a right-back for EFL Championship club Birmingham City.

Laird is a graduate of Manchester United's youth system and made his first-team debut for the club in a UEFA Europa League game in November 2019. He spent time on loan at Milton Keynes Dons, Swansea City, AFC Bournemouth and Queens Park Rangers. In the 2021–22 season, he helped Bournemouth gain promotion to the Premier League by finishing as runners-up in the Championship. He spent the 2022–23 season on loan at Queens Park Rangers before joining Birmingham City, who were relegated to League One at the end of his first season.

Laird has played for England at under-17, under-18 and under-19 levels. He is also eligible to represent Jamaica at international level.

== Club career ==
=== Manchester United ===
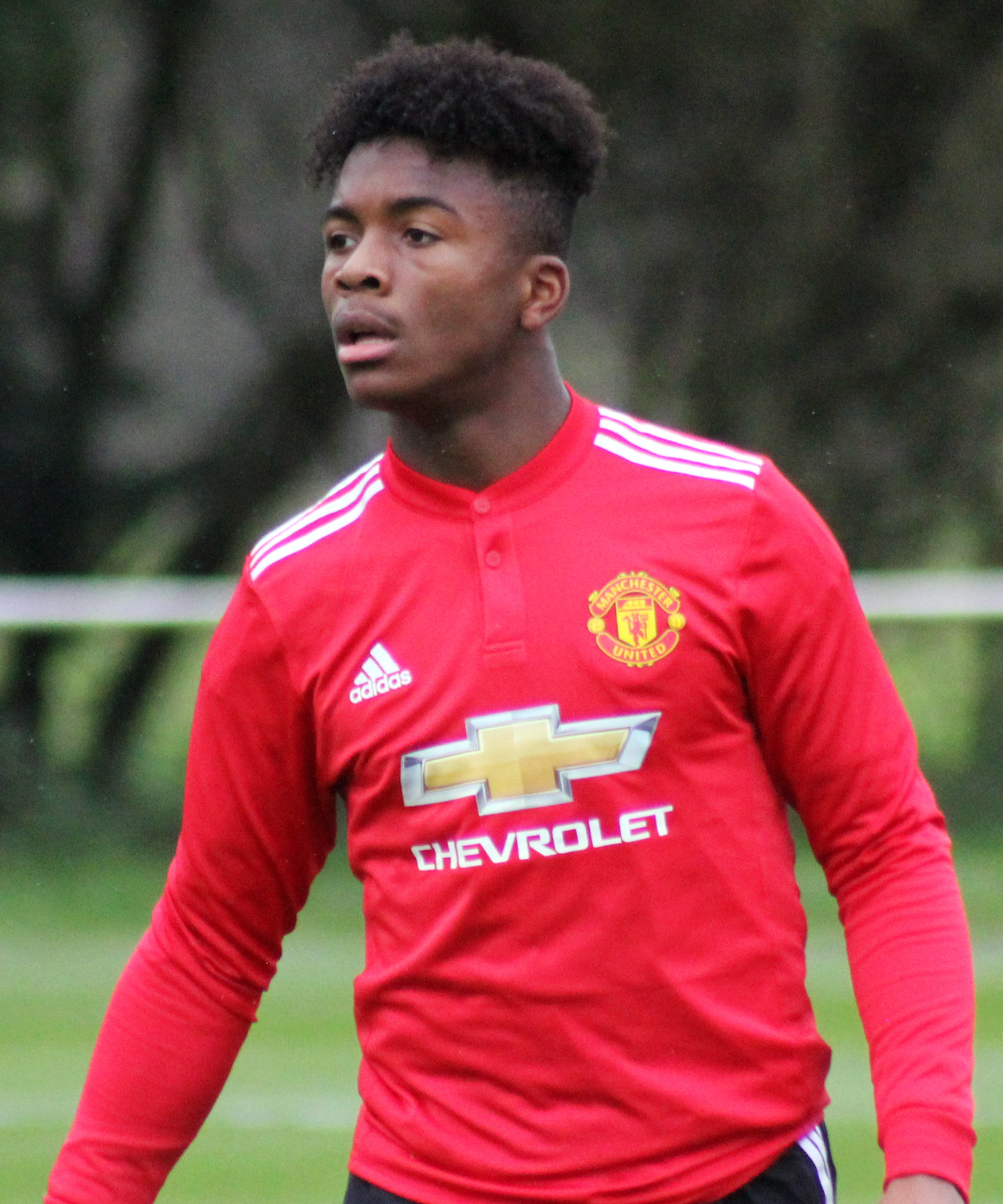
Laird playing for Manchester United U18s in 2017

Laird joined Manchester United's youth system at the age of 10. He made his reserve team debut in a match against Swansea City on 18 March 2018. He signed his first professional contract with the club in October 2018, but less than two months later he suffered a long-term injury in a UEFA Youth League match at home to Young Boys, and made just two more appearances in 2018–19.

Laird graduated to the reserve team for the 2019–20 season, and scored in the team's opening match of their EFL Trophy campaign away to Rotherham United on 6 August 2019; however, he suffered another injury in a game against Reading on 16 August and was ruled out for two months. After returning to action, he was included in the 20-man travelling party for the first team's UEFA Europa League match away to Partizan on 24 October, but was not named in the 18-man squad for the match. After United qualified for the Europa League knockout phase, manager Ole Gunnar Solskjær took a squad mostly made up of youth team players to Kazakhstan for their away game against Astana on 28 November, and named Laird as one of three players to make their senior debuts in the match, along with Di'Shon Bernard and Dylan Levitt; the match finished as a 2–1 defeat.

==== Loan to Milton Keynes Dons ====
On 8 January 2021, Laird joined League One side Milton Keynes Dons on loan until the end of the 2020–21 season. He made his professional league debut for the club on 16 January 2021 in a 3–0 defeat away to Peterborough United.

==== Loan to Swansea City ====
On 16 August 2021, Laird joined EFL Championship club Swansea City on loan for the duration of the 2021–22 season, reuniting with former MK Dons manager Russell Martin.

==== Loan to AFC Bournemouth ====
On 6 January 2022, Laird joined AFC Bournemouth on a short-term loan deal until the end of the season.

==== Loan to Queens Park Rangers ====
On 15 August 2022, Laird joined Queens Park Rangers on loan until the end of the 2022–23 season. On 30 August 2022, Laird scored his first senior goal with the second in an impressive 3–1 victory over Hull City, converting a cross from opposite full-back Kenneth Paal.

=== Birmingham City ===
Laird signed for another Championship club, Birmingham City, on a three-year contract on 30 June 2023; the fee was undisclosed, but was reported by the Manchester Evening News as £750,000 plus add-ons and a sell-on clause. His performances in Birmingham's 2024-25 promotion season earned him a place in the PFA League One Team of the Year. The club earned triple-digit points and he was one of their seven members to be selected.

== International career ==
Laird is eligible to represent England or Jamaica at international level. He has played youth international football for England at under-17, under-18 and under-19 levels. He was a member of the under-17 squad that hosted the 2018 UEFA European Under-17 Championship.

== Career statistics ==
As of 13 October 2026

Appearances and goals by club, season and competition
Club	Season	League			FA Cup		League Cup		Europe		Other		Total	
Club	Season	Division	Apps	Goals	Apps	Goals	Apps	Goals	Apps	Goals	Apps	Goals	Apps	Goals
Manchester United U21	2019–20	—	—		—		—		—		3 (Note: Appearance(s) in EFL Trophy)	1	3	1
Manchester United U21	2020–21	—	—		—		—		—		1	0	1	0
Manchester United U21	Total		—		—		—		—		4	1	4	1
Manchester United	2019–20	Premier League	0	0	0	0	0	0	2 (Note: Appearances in UEFA Europa League)	0	—		2	0
Manchester United	2020–21	Premier League	0	0	0	0	0	0	0	0	—		0	0
Manchester United	2021–22	Premier League	0	0	0	0	0	0	0	0	—		0	0
Manchester United	2022–23	Premier League	0	0	0	0	0	0	0	0	—		0	0
Manchester United	Total		0	0	0	0	0	0	2	0	—		2	0
Milton Keynes Dons (loan)	2020–21	League One	24	0	1	0	0	0	—		0	0	25	0
Swansea City (loan)	2021–22	Championship	20	0	0	0	1	0	—		—		21	0
AFC Bournemouth (loan)	2021–22	Championship	6	0	0	0	0	0	—		—		6	0
Queens Park Rangers (loan)	2022–23	Championship	32	1	1	0	0	0	—		—		33	1
Birmingham City	2023–24	Championship	25	0	1	0	0	0	—		—		26	0
Birmingham City	2024–25	League One	35	4	4	1	2	0	—		6	0	48	5
Birmingham City	2025–26	Championship	20	0	0	0	2	0	—		—		22	0
Birmingham City	2026–27	Championship	7	0	0	0	1	0	—		—		8	0
Birmingham City	Total		87	4	5	1	5	0	—		6	0	104	5
Career total			159	5	7	1	6	0	2	0	10	1	194	7

== Honours ==
AFC Bournemouth

- EFL Championship second-place promotion: 2021–22

Birmingham City

- EFL League One: 2024–25
- EFL Trophy runner-up: 2024–25

Individual

- PFA Team of the Year: 2024–25 League One
