= August Priske =

Danish footballer (born 2004)

Personal information
- Full name: August Priske Flyger
- Date of birth: 23 March 2004 (age 22)
- Place of birth: Genk, Belgium
- Height: 1.95 m (6 ft 5 in)
- Position: Forward

Team information
- Current team: Birmingham City
- Number: 9

Youth career
- Stensballe IK
- –2014: Horsens
- 2014–2016: Midtjylland
- 2016–2017: Copenhagen
- 2017–2021: Midtjylland

Senior career*
Years	Team	Apps	(Gls)
2021–2024	Midtjylland	1	(0)
2021–2023	→ Jong PSV (loan)	42	(4)
2023–2024	→ FC Eindhoven (loan)	27	(3)
2024–2026	Djurgårdens IF	35	(18)
2026–	Birmingham City	26	(7)

International career^{‡}
2022	Denmark U-18	2	(0)
2022–2023	Denmark U-19	5	(2)
2023–2025	Denmark U-20	5	(1)
2025–	Denmark U-21	7	(2)
- * Club domestic league appearances and goals as of 03:12, 13 October 2026 (UTC) ‡ National team caps and goals as of 02:00, 2 April 2026 (UTC)

August Priske Flyger (born 23 March 2004) is a Danish professional footballer who plays as a forward for EFL Championship club Birmingham City. He is the son of former Danish international footballer Brian Priske.

== Career ==
=== Early career ===
Priske started playing in Denmark at AC Horsens, and then went to FC Copenhagen, where he played there for one and-a-half year. He then moved to FC Midtjylland.

Priske went on loan from FC Midtjylland to PSV Eindhoven in September 2021. He started playing for their under-18 team, and made his senior debut for Jong PSV in the Eerste Divisie in January 2022, scoring on his debut in a 5–1 win against Almere City. The loan was repeated for the 2022–23 season but PSV stipulated an option to buy in the deal.

Priske returned to Midtjylland ahead of the 2023–24 season and was given his Danish Superliga debut against Lyngby Boldklub on 6 August 2023. However, two weeks later, he moved to Eerste Divisie side FC Eindhoven on a one-year loan deal and—at the same time—extended his contract with Midtjylland until June 2028. After finishing his loan spell, Priske returned to Midtjylland.

=== Djurgården ===
In August 2024, he signed for Allsvenskan club Djurgårdens IF Fotboll, agreeing to a four-year contract. He made his debut for the club appearing as a substitute in the UEFA Conference League against Finnish side Ilves on 8 August 2024.

In 2025, Priske scored 18 league goals in 27 games to finish top scorer in Sweden's Allsvenskan and also featured prominently in the UEFA Conference League as Djurgården reached the semi-finals, where they were eventually beaten by Chelsea.

=== Birmingham City ===
On 20 January 2026, Priske signed a five-and-a-half year contract at EFL Championship club Birmingham City, joining for an undisclosed fee. He made his Blues debut on 24 January 2026 as a 56th-minute substitute in a 1–1 league draw with Stoke City. On 2 May 2026, the last match of the season, he scored his first goal for the club in a 1–1 league draw with Portsmouth at Fratton Park.

== International career ==
Priske has represented the Denmark national under-19 football team.

== Personal life ==
He was born in Belgium, and is the son of football manager and former Danish international football player Brian Priske.

== Career statistics ==
As of match played 13 October 2026

Appearances and goals by club, season and competition
Club	Season	League			National cup (Note: Includes Danish Cup, KNVB Cup, Svenska Cupen, FA Cup)		League cup (Note: Includes EFL Cup)		Other		Total	
Club	Season	Division	Apps	Goals	Apps	Goals	Apps	Goals	Apps	Goals	Apps	Goals
Midtjylland	2021–22	Danish Superliga	0	0	0	0	—		—		0	0
Midtjylland	2022–23	Danish Superliga	0	0	0	0	—		—		0	0
Midtjylland	2023–24	Danish Superliga	1	0	0	0	—		—		1	0
Midtjylland	Total		1	0	0	0	—		—		1	0
Jong PSV (loan)	2021–22	Eerste Divisie	13	1	—		—		—		13	1
Jong PSV (loan)	2022–23	Eerste Divisie	29	3	—		—		—		29	3
Jong PSV (loan)	Total		42	4	—		—		—		42	4
FC Eindhoven (loan)	2023–24	Eerste Divisie	28	3	2	0	—		—		30	3
Djurgårdens IF	2024	Allsvenskan	8	0	3	4	—		—		11	4
Djurgårdens IF	2025	Allsvenskan	27	18	1	1	—		13 (Note: Appearacnes in UEFA Conference League)	1	28	20
Djurgårdens IF	Total		35	18	4	5	—		13	1	52	24
Birmingham City	2025–26	EFL Championship	17	1	1	0	—		—		18	1
Birmingham City	2026–27	EFL Championship	10	6	0	0	2	1	—		11	7
Birmingham City	Total		27	7	1	0	2	1	—		29	6
Career total			132	30	7	5	2	1	13	1	154	37

== Honours ==
Individual

- Allsvenskan top scorer: 2025 (shared with Ibrahim Diabate)
- Allsvenskan Forward of the Year: 2025
