= Menzi Mazwi =

Zimbabwean football player (born 2005)

Personal information
- Full name: Menzi Brayden Maphosa Mazwi
- Date of birth: 18 April 2006 (age 20)
- Place of birth: Newport, Wales
- Height: 1.74 m (5 ft 9 in)
- Position: Winger

Team information
- Current team: Birmingham City
- Number: 19

Youth career
- 2012–: Birmingham City

Senior career*
Years	Team	Apps	(Gls)
2024–	Birmingham City	0	(0)
2026	→ Queen of the South (loan)	1	(0)

International career^{‡}
2024	Wales U19	2	(0)
2025–	Zimbabwe	1	(0)
- * Club domestic league appearances and goals as of 18:55, 17 June 2025 (UTC) ‡ National team caps and goals as of 18:55, 17 June 2025 (UTC)

Menzi Brayden Maphosa Mazwi (born 18 April 2006) is a professional footballer who plays as a forward for Birmingham City. Born in Wales, he plays for the Zimbabwe national team.

== Career ==
Mazi was part of Birmingham City's youth academy for 12 years. On 2 July 2024, he signed his first professional contract with Birmingham City for 3 years.

== International career ==
Born in Wales, Mazwi is of Zimbabwean descent. On 12 March 2024, he was called up to the Wales U19s for a set of friendlies. He was called up to the senior Zimbabwe national team for the 2025 COSAFA Cup.
