= Garry Cook (sports executive) =

British sports executive

- Born: Birmingham, UK
- Occupation: Sports executive
- Known for: Chief Executive, Manchester City F.C.
- Predecessor: Alistair Mackintosh
- Successor: Ferran Soriano

Garry Cook is a British sports executive. He worked for Manchester City between 2008 and 2011, Nike between 1996 and 2008, and for UFC between 2012 and 2016. In January 2023, Cook was appointed the executive president and CEO of the Saudi Professional League. He was CEO of Birmingham City F.C. from July 2023 to January 2025.

== Biography ==
Cook was born in Birmingham. He moved to the United States in 1985.

=== Nike ===
Cook started working for sports wear brand Nike in 1996. Cook worked his way up to head of the Nike project "Brand Jordan", working very closely with basketball star Michael Jordan while working at Nike.

=== Manchester City ===
On becoming the new owner of Manchester City, Thaksin Shinawatra contacted Cook about becoming CEO of the club after the departure of Alistair Mackintosh. Cook accepted the offer and was appointed CEO of the club in May 2008. His salary was £1,500,000 in 2009.

One of Cook's first tasks with his new club was to find a new manager after Sven-Göran Eriksson had been dismissed; he targeted Mark Hughes of Blackburn Rovers. On 4 June 2008, Hughes signed a three-year deal with the club. On the day Hughes was unveiled to the media, Cook stated: "I am delighted to welcome Mark on board, In our view he is the brightest young manager in the game and he was our number one target for the manager's job."

In August 2008 he criticised club captain Richard Dunne, who the fans had voted player of the year for the previous four seasons, saying: "China and India are gagging for football content to watch and we're going to tell them that City is their content. We need a superstar to get through that door. Richard Dunne doesn't roll off the tongue in Beijing". He also said of Thaksin, "Is he a nice guy? Yes. Is he a great guy to play golf with? Yes. Has he got the finances to run a club? Yes....Whether he's guilty of something over there, I can't worry too much about....Morally, I feel comfortable in this environment". Just over a year later Cook said he felt "dreadful" about having made that comment. "I have made some mistakes in my life", Cook said, "but I deeply regretted my failure to do proper research on Thaksin".

Cook's new task was player recruitment, completing the signings of Tal Ben Haim, Jo, Vincent Kompany, Pablo Zabaleta and Shaun Wright-Phillips.

On 1 September, Manchester City were taken over by the Abu Dhabi United Group. Cook subsequently completed the transfer of Brazilian Robinho to the club from Real Madrid for a British transfer record of £32.5 million. Cook retained his role as CEO under the new owners reporting to new chairman, Khaldoon Al Mubarak, who replaced the previous owner outgoing Shinawatra.

After the 2009 January transfer window opened Mark Hughes and Cook sealed signings for Wayne Bridge, Craig Bellamy, Shay Given and Nigel de Jong. However, Cook failed in a world record bid to bring Kaká to the club, blaming the breakdown in negotiations on A.C. Milan.

Cook also did much work away from transfers introducing the "My first City game" campaign where supporters of the club write in their memories of their first ever game watching the team, these have then been placed around the interior of the stadium. Many fans have contributed to this, including Ricky Hatton.

After City finished 10th in the Premier League in Cook's first season with the club, he went about bringing in further targets of Hughes. In the summer of 2009 Cook signed Gareth Barry, Roque Santa Cruz, Stuart Taylor, Carlos Tevez, Emmanuel Adebayor, Kolo Touré, Joleon Lescott and Sylvinho. Cook also built his own team around him with Brian Marwood joining the club.

Alongside Al Mubarak, Cook oversaw a complete overhaul of the club's training base at Carrington, and scheduled a 2009 summer tour of South Africa where the squad met Nelson Mandela.

He made a gaffe by welcoming Uwe Rösler to the Manchester United Hall of Fame instead of the Manchester City Hall of Fame, and was booed by Manchester City fans. He wrote apology letters to 70 Manchester City supporters' clubs.

In September 2011, Cook offered his resignation after insensitive email allegations towards a player's mother. The Manchester City board believed there was evidence to back the allegations and accepted his resignation on 9 September 2011. Chairman Khaldoon Al Mubarak thanked Cook for his efforts in transforming the club's infrastructure and direction.

=== UFC ===
In September 2012, Cook was appointed Executive Vice President and Managing Director of Europe, Middle East and Africa for the UFC. He was fired from the UFC in a later round of staffing cuts initiated after the sale of Zuffa, LLC to WME-IMG.

=== Saudi Professional League ===
In January 2023, Cook was appointed the executive president and CEO of the Saudi Professional League. Upon his announcement, he stated his commitment to transforming Saudi football into a global powerhouse, aligning with the country's Saudi Vision 2030 plan. Cook is tasked with implementing strategies to attract elite international players to join Cristiano Ronaldo in the national league, with the aim of turning it into a destination for talent by offering high salaries funded by the kingdom's sovereign wealth fund.

=== Birmingham City ===
On 14 July 2023, following the acquisition of Birmingham City by Knighthead Capital Management LLC, Chairman of the Board Tom Wagner installed Cook as CEO of the club. A lifelong Birmingham City fan, Cook said, “The landscape of Birmingham is continuing to positively change. It's young, multicultural and dynamic. It is time for the football club that bears its name, and shares its values, to add to this exciting story. With the support of Tom [Wagner] and the Knighthead team, and in partnership with the city of Birmingham, we aim to be world class in everything that we do." He stepped down from the role and from the club's board of directors on 16 January 2025 for personal reasons, while continuing his membership of the club's advisory committee and trusteeship of the Birmingham City Foundation.
