= Birmingham City F.C. =

Association football club in England

Birmingham City
- Full name: Birmingham City Football Club
- Nickname: Blues
- Short name: BCFC
- Founded: September 1875; 151 years ago as Small Heath Alliance
- Ground: St Andrew's
- Capacity: 29,409
- Owner: Shelby Companies Ltd. (96.64%)
- Chairman: Tom Wagner
- Manager: Chris Davies
- League: EFL Championship
- 2025–26: EFL Championship, 10th of 24
- Website: bcfc.com
Home colours	Away colours	Third colours

Birmingham City Football Club is a professional football club based in Bordesley, Birmingham, England. Formed in 1875 as Small Heath Alliance, it was renamed Small Heath in 1888, Birmingham in 1905, and Birmingham City in 1943. The club competes in the Championship, the second tier of English football.

As Small Heath, they played in the Football Alliance before becoming founder members and first champions of the Football League Second Division. The most successful period in their history was in the 1950s and early 1960s. They achieved their highest finishing position of sixth in the First Division in the 1955–56 season and reached the 1956 FA Cup final. Birmingham played in two Inter-Cities Fairs Cup finals, in 1960, as the first English club side to reach a major European final, and again the following year. They won the League Cup in 1963 and again in 2011. Birmingham have played in the top tier of English football for around half of their history: the longest period spent outside the top division, between 1986 and 2002, included two brief spells in the third tier of English football, during which time they won the Football League Trophy twice.

St Andrew's, currently known as St. Andrew's @ Knighthead Park since 2024 for sponsorship reasons, has been their home ground since 1906. They have a long-standing and fierce rivalry with Aston Villa, their nearest neighbours, with whom they play the Second City derby. The club's nickname is Blues, after the colour of their kit, and the fans are known as Bluenoses.

As with most clubs, Birmingham City also operates its own charitable foundation that works across the local community, with a focus on breaking down barriers to participation through competitions like the Trevor Francis Schools Cup for secondary school children, and the Vertu Primary Schools Cup.

== History ==
=== The early years (1875–1943) ===
Small Heath F.C., champions of the inaugural Football League Second Division in 1892–93

Birmingham City were founded as Small Heath Alliance in 1875, and from 1877 played their home games at Muntz Street. The 'Heathens' turned professional in 1885, and three years later became the first football club to become a limited company with a board of directors, under the name of Small Heath F.C. Ltd. From the 1889–90 season they played in the Football Alliance, which ran alongside the Football League. In 1892, Small Heath, along with the other Alliance teams, were invited to join the newly formed Football League Second Division. They finished as champions, but failed to win promotion via the test match system; the following season promotion to the First Division was secured after a second-place finish and test match victory over Darwen. The club adopted the name Birmingham Football Club in 1905, and moved into their new home, St Andrew's Ground, the following year. Matters on the field failed to live up to their surroundings. Birmingham were relegated in 1908, obliged to apply for re-election two years later, and remained in the Second Division until after the First World War.

Frank Womack's captaincy and the creativity of Scottish international playmaker Johnny Crosbie contributed much to Birmingham winning their second Division Two title in 1920–21. Womack went on to make 515 appearances, a club record for an outfielder, over a twenty-year career. 1920 also saw the debut of the 19-year-old Joe Bradford, who went on to score a club record 267 goals in 445 games, and won 12 caps for England. In 1931, manager Leslie Knighton led the club to their first FA Cup final, which they lost 2–1 to Second Division club West Bromwich Albion. Though Birmingham remained in the top flight for 18 seasons, they struggled in the league, with much reliance placed on England goalkeeper Harry Hibbs to make up for the lack of goals, Bradford excepted, at the other end. They were finally relegated in 1939, the last full season before the Football League was abandoned for the duration of the Second World War.

=== Birmingham City: Post-war success (1943–1965) ===
The name Birmingham City F.C. was adopted in 1943. Under Harry Storer, appointed manager in 1945, the club won the Football League South wartime league and reached the semi-final of the first post-war FA Cup. Two years later they won their third Second Division title, conceding only 24 goals in the 42-game season. Storer's successor, Bob Brocklebank, though unable to stave off relegation in 1950, brought in players who made a major contribution to the club's successes of the next decade. When Arthur Turner took over as manager in November 1954, he made them play closer to their potential, and a 5–1 win on the last day of the 1954–55 season confirmed them as champions. In their first season back in the First Division, Birmingham achieved their highest league finish of sixth place. They also reached the FA Cup final, losing 3–1 to Manchester City in the game notable for Manchester City's goalkeeper Bert Trautmann playing the last 20 minutes with a broken bone in his neck. The following season the club lost in the FA Cup semi-final for the third time since the war, this time beaten 2–0 by Manchester United's "Busby Babes".

Birmingham became the first English club side to take part in European competition when they played their first group game in the inaugural Inter-Cities Fairs Cup competition on 15 May 1956; they went on to reach the semi-final, in which they drew 4–4 on aggregate with Barcelona but lost the replay 2–1. They were also the first English club side to reach a European final, losing 4–1 on aggregate to Barcelona in the 1960 Fairs Cup final and 4–2 to A.S. Roma the following year. In the 1961 semi-final they beat Internazionale home and away; no other English club won a competitive game in the San Siro until Arsenal managed it in 2003. Gil Merrick's side saved their best form for cup competitions. Though opponents in the 1963 League Cup final, local rivals Aston Villa, were pre-match favourites, Birmingham raised their game and won 3–1 on aggregate to lift their first major trophy. In 1965, after ten years in the top flight, they returned to the Second Division.

=== Investment, promotion and decline (1965–1993) ===
Businessman Clifford Coombs took over as chairman in 1965, luring Stan Cullis out of retirement to manage the club. Cullis's team played attractive football which took them to the semi-finals of the League Cup in 1967 and of the FA Cup in 1968, but league football needed a different approach. Successor Freddie Goodwin produced a team playing skilful, aggressive football that won promotion as well as reaching an FA Cup semi-final. Two years later, the club raised money by selling Bob Latchford to Everton for a British record fee of £350,000, but without his goals the team struggled. Sir Alf Ramsey briefly managed the club before Jim Smith took over in 1978. With relegation a certainty, the club sold Trevor Francis to Nottingham Forest, making him the first player transferred for a fee of £1 million; Francis had scored 133 goals in 329 appearances over his nine years at Birmingham.

Smith took Birmingham straight back to the First Division, but a poor start to the 1981–82 season saw him replaced by Ron Saunders, who had just resigned from league champions Aston Villa. Saunders' team struggled to score goals and were relegated in 1984. They bounced back up, but the last home game of the 1984–85 promotion season, against Leeds United, was marred by rioting, culminating in the death of a boy when a wall collapsed on him. This was on the same day as the Bradford City stadium fire, and the events at St Andrew's formed part of the remit of Mr Justice Popplewell's inquiry into safety at sports grounds. The club lacked stability both on and off the field. Saunders quit after FA Cup defeat to non-League team Altrincham, staff were laid off, the training ground was sold, and by 1989 Birmingham were in the Third Division for the first time in their history.

In April 1989 the Kumar brothers, owners of a clothing chain, bought the club. A rapid turnover of managers, the absence of promised investment, and a threatened mass refusal of players to renew contracts was relieved only by a victorious trip to Wembley in the Associate Members' Cup. Terry Cooper delivered promotion, but the collapse of the Bank of Credit and Commerce International (BCCI) put the Kumars' businesses into receivership; in November 1992 BCCI's liquidator put up for sale their 84% holding in the football club.

=== Sale and reconstruction (1992–2007) ===
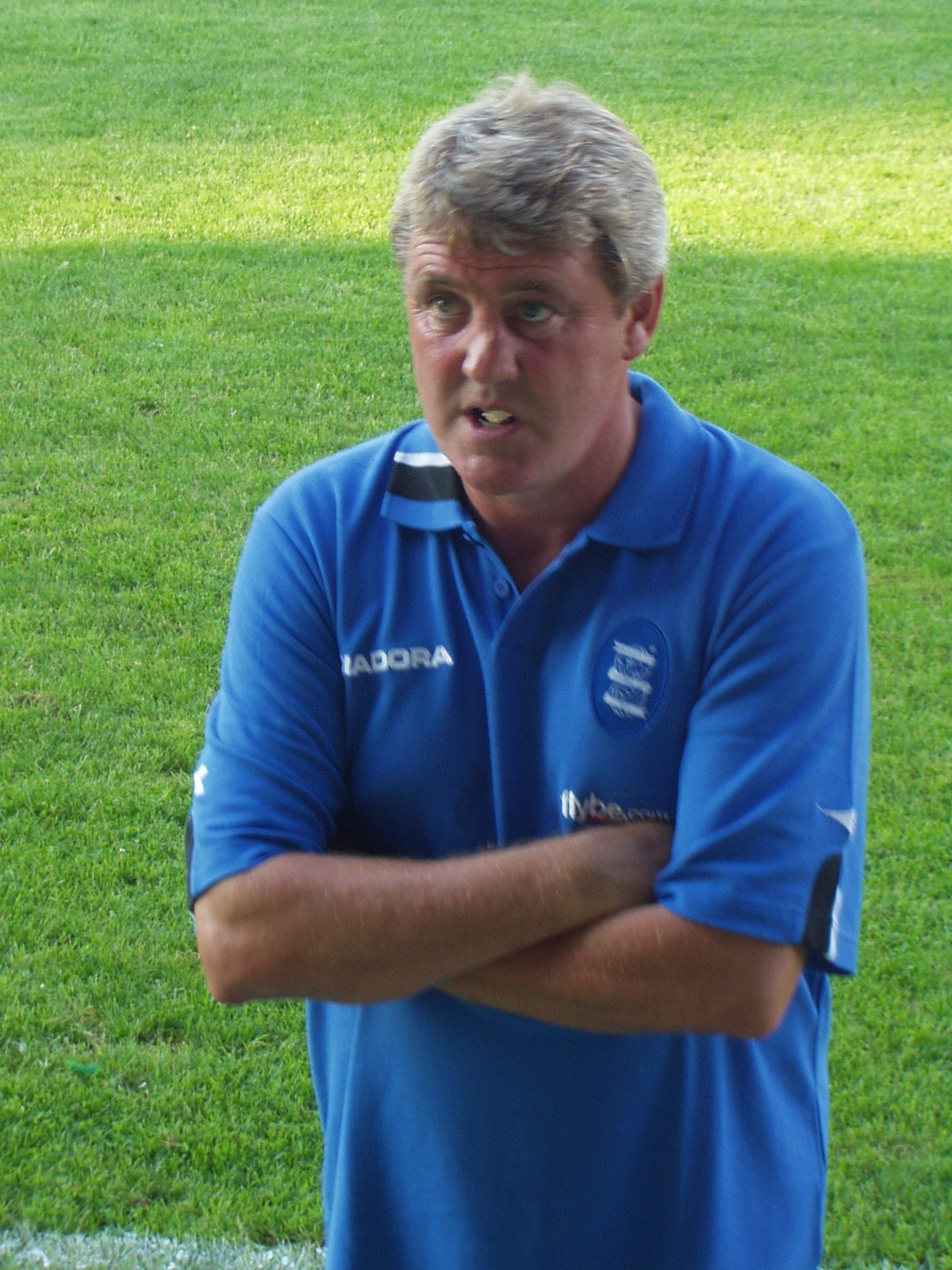
Manager Steve Bruce led Birmingham City to promotion to the Premier League in 2002 and 2007

The club continued in administration for four months, until Sport Newspapers' proprietor David Sullivan bought it for £700,000, installed the then 23-year-old Karren Brady as managing director and allowed Cooper money for signings. On the last day of the season, the team avoided relegation back to the third tier, but after a poor start to the 1993–94 season Cooper was replaced by Barry Fry. The change did not prevent relegation, but Fry's first full season brought promotion back to the second tier as champions, and victory over Carlisle United in the Football League Trophy via Paul Tait's golden goal completed the "lower-league Double". After one more year, Fry was dismissed to make way for the return of Trevor Francis.

Reinforced by players with top-level experience, including Manchester United captain Steve Bruce, Francis's team narrowly missed out on a play-off position in 1998, and three years of play-off semi-final defeats followed. They reached the 2001 League Cup final against Liverpool at Cardiff's Millennium Stadium. Birmingham equalised in the last minute of normal time, but the match went to a penalty shoot-out which Liverpool won. By October 2001, lack of progress had made Francis's position untenable; after a 6–0 League Cup defeat to Manchester City, he left by mutual consent. Bruce's return as manager shook up a stale team; he took them from mid-table to the play-offs, with the club defeating Norwich City on penalties in the final to secure promotion to the Premier League.

Motivated by the inspirational Christophe Dugarry, Birmingham's first top-flight season for 16 years finished in mid-table. Loan signing Mikael Forssell's 17 league goals helped Birmingham to a top-half finish in 2003–04, but when he was injured, the 2004–05 team struggled for goals. In July 2005, chairman David Gold said it was time to "start talking about being as good as anyone outside the top three or four" with "the best squad of players for 25 years". Injuries, loss of form, and lack of transfer window investment saw them relegated in a season which included a 7–0 FA Cup defeat to Liverpool. Jermaine Pennant and Emile Heskey left for record fees, many others were released, but Bruce's amended recruitment strategy, combining free-transfer experience with young "hungry" players and shrewd exploitation of the loan market, brought automatic promotion at the end of a season which had included calls by some fans for his dismissal.

=== The Chinese years (2007–2023) ===
In July 2007, Hong Kong-based businessman Carson Yeung bought 29.9% of shares in the club, making him the biggest single shareholder, with a view to taking full control in the future. Uncertain as to his future under possible new owners, Bruce left in mid-season. His successor, Scotland national team manager Alex McLeish, was unable to stave off relegation, but achieved promotion back to the Premier League at the first attempt. Yeung's company completed the takeover in 2009, and the team finished in ninth place, their highest for 51 years. In 2011, they combined a second League Cup, defeating favourites Arsenal 2–1 with goals from Nikola Žigić and Obafemi Martins and securing qualification for the Europa League, with relegation back to the second tier, after which McLeish resigned to join Aston Villa.

Birmingham narrowly failed to reach the knockout rounds of the Europa League and the play-off final. With the club in financial turmoil and under a transfer embargo, manager Chris Hughton left. Under Lee Clark, Birmingham twice retained their divisional status, albeit through Paul Caddis's 93rd-minute goal in the last match of 2013–14 to avoid relegation on goal difference, but continued poor form saw him dismissed in October 2014. Gary Rowett stabilised the team and led them to two tenth-place finishes before being controversially dismissed by new owners Trillion Trophy Asia in favour of the "pedigree" of Gianfranco Zola, who would aid the club's "strategic, long-term view" to take the club in a new direction.

Two wins from 24 matches under Zola left Birmingham needing two wins from the last three games to stay up, which they achieved under the managership of Harry Redknapp. Redknapp lasted another month, his former assistant Steve Cotterill five months, leaving successor Garry Monk another – ultimately successful – relegation battle. Despite budgetary restrictions and a nine-point deduction for breaches of the League's Profitability and Sustainability (P&S) rules, the team finished 17th in 2018–19; however, Monk was dismissed in June after conflict with the board. He was succeeded by his assistant, Pep Clotet, initially as caretaker. In the 2019–20 season, the club once again avoided relegation despite a 14-match winless run at the end of the season and the threat of a further points deduction. Academy product Jude Bellingham was sold to Borussia Dortmund in the summer for a club-record deal reported to be worth up to £30 million, after which Aitor Karanka lasted eight months as head coach before being replaced by former Birmingham player Lee Bowyer. After 16 months and yet another relegation struggle, amid rumours of an imminent takeover, Bowyer was replaced by John Eustace.

=== American control (2023–present) ===
After two takeover attempts fell through, Shelby Companies Ltd, a subsidiary of US-based Knighthead Capital Management and fronted by that company's co-founder Tom Wagner, purchased a controlling stake in the club and full ownership of the stadium on 13 July 2023. Former Manchester City CEO Garry Cook was appointed to the corresponding role at Birmingham, and the club gained considerable publicity from the arrival of American football player Tom Brady as minority owner.

In early October, with the team in the play-off places, Eustace was dismissed. In a move that echoed Rowett's replacement by Zola seven years prior, the board stressed the need for "a winning mentality and a culture of ambition" across the club, and a new appointment with "[responsibility] for creating an identity and clear 'no fear' playing style". After former England international Wayne Rooney's two wins from 15 matches left Birmingham in 20th place, Tony Mowbray was appointed manager. His need for medical leave brought the interim appointment of Gary Rowett, whose 11 points from the last eight games were not enough to prevent relegation to League One after 29 years at a higher level. In June 2024, Birmingham named Chris Davies as manager, signing him to a four-year contract. Under Davies, they returned to the Championship at the first attempt, winning the League One title. They also reached the 2025 EFL Trophy final but lost 2–0 to Peterborough United. In November 2025, Knighthead completed takeover of the club, buying the 51% still owned by ZO Future Group (formally Birmingham Sports Holdings Limited).

In 2026, Birmingham City FC sold a 97% stake in its women's team to an investment group led by Shelby Companies, a subsidiary of Knighthead Capital Management. The consortium also included former England international Karen Carney and former tennis world No. 1 Kim Clijsters. The acquisition aimed to strengthen the team's sporting competitiveness and enhance its international profile. The transaction formed part of a broader urban and sporting development strategy linked to plans for a new stadium and a large-scale business district project in Birmingham.

== Colours and badge ==
Small Heath Alliance original kit

The Small Heath Alliance members decided among themselves that their colours would be blue; in the early days, they wore whatever blue shirt they had. The first uniform kit was a dark blue shirt with a sash over the right shoulder variously described as white, yellow, or red. Several variations on a blue theme were tried; the one that stuck was the royal blue shirt with a white "V", adopted during the First World War and retained until the late 1920s. Though the design changed, the royal blue remained. In 1971 they adopted the "penguin" strip – royal blue with a broad white central front panel – which lasted five years. Since then they have generally worn plain, nominally royal blue shirts, though the actual shade used has varied. Shorts have been either blue or white, and socks usually blue, white or a combination. White, yellow, red and black, on their own or in combination, have been the most frequently used colours for the away kit.

There were aberrations: the 1992 kit, sponsored by Triton Showers, was made of a blue material covered with multicoloured splashes which resembled a shower curtain. The home shirt has only once featured stripes: in 1999, the blue shirt had a front central panel in narrow blue and white stripes, a design similar to the Tesco supermarket carrier bag of the time.

When the club changed its name from Small Heath to Birmingham in 1905 it adopted the city's coat of arms as its badge, although this was not always worn on the shirts. The 1970s "penguin" shirt carried the letters "BCFC" intertwined at the centre of the chest. The Sports Argus newspaper ran a competition in 1972 to design a new badge for the club. The winning entry, a line-drawn globe and ball, with a ribbon carrying the club's name and date of foundation, in plain blue and white, was adopted by the club but not worn on playing shirts until 1976, after the design was granted by the College of Arms in 1975. An experiment made in the early 1990s with colouring in the globe and ball was soon abandoned.

The club rarely spends more than three seasons with the same kit supplier. The first sponsor to have its name on the shirt was Birmingham-based brewery Ansells in 1983. They withdrew in mid-1985, and the shirts went unsponsored until January 1987, when Co-op Milk paid a "five-figure sum" to have its name displayed until the end of the season. That was a relief to the club not only financially: the vice-chairman claimed that as a "big club ... people expect us to have a shirt sponsor and we have been lagging behind". Later sponsors included car retailer PJ Evans/Evans Halshaw (1988–1989), Mark One (1989–1992), Triton Showers (1992–1995), Auto Windscreens (1995–2001), Phones 4u (2001–2003), Flybe (2003–2007), F&C Investments (2007–2011), foreign exchange company RationalFX (2011–2012), "lifestyle and leisure" business EZE Group (2012–2013 and 2015–2016), e-cigarette company Nicolites (2013–2014), mobile payment enabler Zapaygo (2014–2015), 888sport (2016–2019) and BoyleSports (2019–2023).

In June 2020, the club announced a four-year partnership with Nike as supplier of kits, upgraded during the 2023–24 season to include bespoke rather than off-the-shelf product. The 2024–25 home kit consists of a royal blue shirt with white trim and – with echoes of the Co-op Milk shirt of the 1980s – a white strip across the front carrying the logo of the club's principal partner, streetwear company Undefeated, white shorts and royal blue socks.

== Stadiums ==
Small Heath Alliance played their first home games on waste ground off Arthur Street, Bordesley Green. As interest grew, they moved to a fenced-off field in Ladypool Road, Sparkbrook, where admission could be charged. A year later, they moved again, to a field adjoining Muntz Street, Small Heath, near the main Coventry Road, with a capacity of about 10,000. The Muntz Street ground was adequate for 1880s friendly matches, and the capacity was gradually raised to around 30,000, but when several thousand spectators scaled walls and broke down turnstiles to get into a First Division match against Aston Villa, it became clear that it could no longer cope with the demand.

Director Harry Morris identified a site for a new ground in Bordesley Green, some three-quarters of a mile (1 km) from Muntz Street towards the city centre. The site was where a brickworks once operated; the land sloped steeply down to stagnant pools, yet the stadium was constructed in under twelve months from land clearance to opening ceremony on Boxing Day 1906. Heavy snow nearly prevented the opening; volunteers had to clear pitch and terraces before the match, a goalless draw against Middlesbrough, could go ahead. The ground is reputed to have been cursed by gypsies evicted from the site; although gypsies are known to have camped nearby, there is no contemporary evidence for their eviction by the club.

Average and peak league attendances at St Andrew's

The original capacity of St Andrew's was reported as 75,000, with 4,000 seats in the Main Stand and space for 22,000 under cover. By 1938 the official capacity was 68,000, and February 1939 saw the attendance record set at the fifth round FA Cup tie against Everton, variously recorded as 66,844 or 67,341. (Note: Some sources give the record attendance as 66,844: these include the records page of Birmingham City F.C.'s website and Rothmans Football Yearbook. Others, including the history page of Birmingham City F.C.'s website, Matthews' Encyclopedia, and The Times newspaper from the Monday following the match, say 67,341.) On the outbreak of the Second World War, the Chief Constable ordered the ground's closure because of the danger from air raids; it was the only ground to be thus closed, and was only re-opened after the matter was raised in Parliament. It was badly damaged during the Birmingham Blitz: the Railway End and the Kop as a result of bombing, while the Main Stand burnt down when a fireman mistook petrol for water.

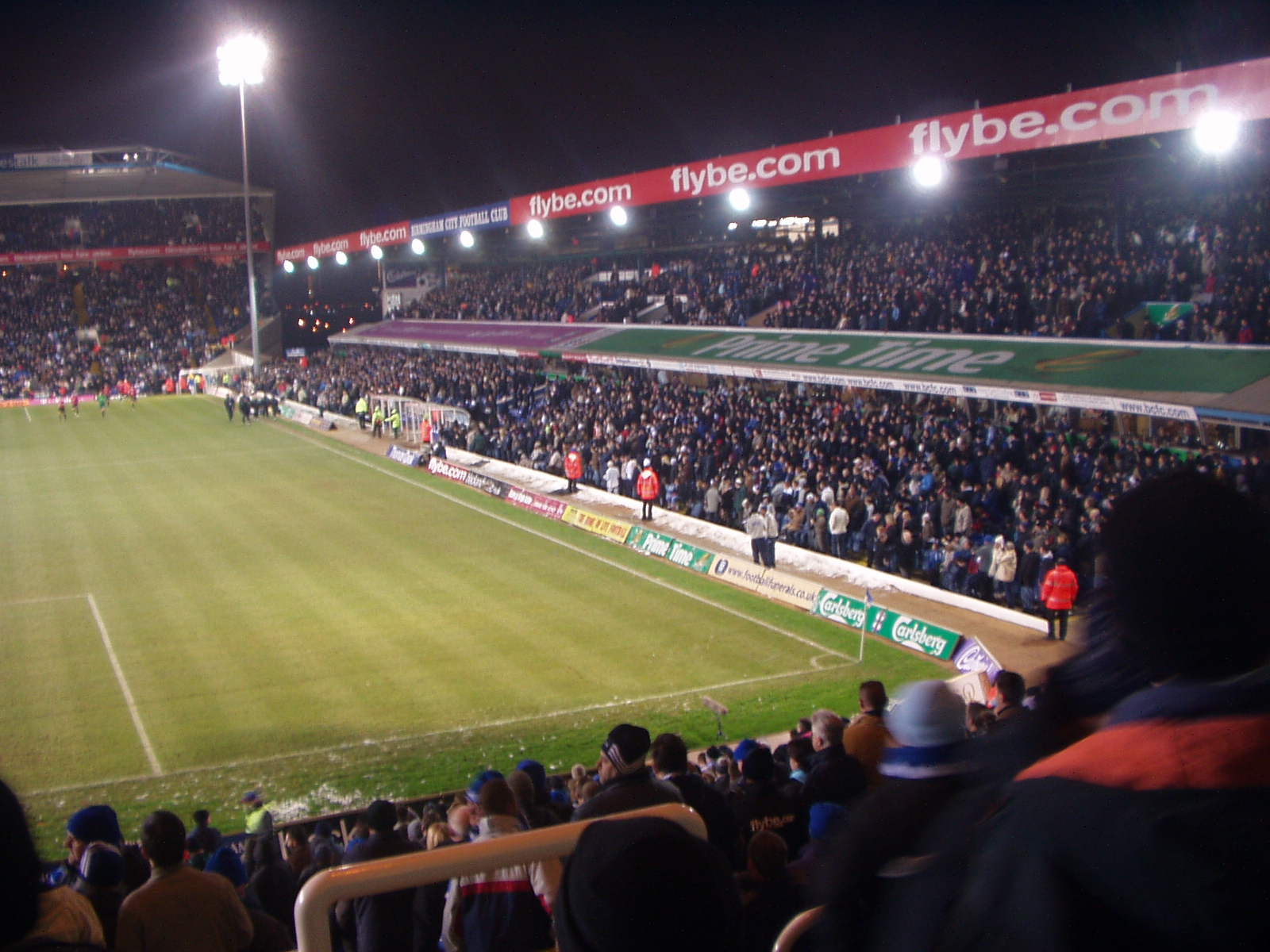
Main Stand, St Andrew's, 2005

The replacement Main Stand used a propped cantilever roof design, which meant fewer pillars to block spectators' view of the pitch. Floodlights were installed in 1956, and officially switched on for a friendly match against Borussia Dortmund in 1957. By the early 1960s a stand had been built at the Railway End to the same design as the Main Stand, roofs had been put on the Kop and Tilton Road End, and the ground capacity was down to about 55,000.

Resulting from the 1986 Popplewell Report into the safety of sports grounds and the later Taylor Report, the capacity of St Andrew's was set at 28,235 for safety reasons, but it was accepted that the stadium had to be brought up to modern all-seated standards. After the last home game of the 1993–94 season, the Kop and Tilton Road terraces were demolished – fans took home a significant proportion as souvenirs – to be replaced at the start of the new season by a 7,000-seat Tilton Road Stand, continuing round the corner into the 9,500-seat Kop which opened two months later. The 8,000-seat Railway Stand followed in 1999; ten years later, this was renamed the Gil Merrick Stand, in honour of the club's appearance record-holder and former manager, but the Main Stand has still to be modernised. In 2021, the club website listed the stadium capacity as 29,409.

In 2004, a proposal was put forward to build a "sports village" comprising a 55,000-capacity City of Birmingham Stadium, other sports and leisure facilities, and a super casino, to be jointly financed by Birmingham City Council, Birmingham City F.C. (via the proceeds of the sale of St Andrew's) and the casino group Las Vegas Sands. The feasibility of the plan depended on the government issuing a licence for a super casino, and Birmingham being chosen as the venue, but this did not happen. The club have planning permission to redevelop the Main Stand, but club and council continued to seek alternative sources of funding for the City of Birmingham Stadium project.

In 2013, the Birmingham City Supporters' Trust's application for listing St Andrew's as an Asset of Community Value (ACV) – a building or other land whose main use "furthers the social wellbeing or social interests of the local community" and where it is realistic to believe it could do so in the future. – under the Localism Act 2011 was approved by Birmingham City Council. This requires any proposed sale to be notified to the council, and provides for a six-month moratorium on that sale to allow the Trust and other community groups to submit their own bid. In 2018, the club's owners agreed a three-year sponsorship deal under which the name became St Andrew's Trillion Trophy Stadium.

The lower tiers of the Tilton and Kop stands were closed for asbestos abatement for the next three years, reopening fully in November 2023. In 2024, the stadium was renamed St. Andrew's @ Knighthead Park for sponsorship reasons, as "step one in [the owners'] plan to create a world-renowned 'Sports Quarter' in Birmingham."

== Supporters ==
Birmingham fans consider their main rivals to be Aston Villa, their nearest neighbours geographically, with whom they contest the Second City derby. Lesser rivalries include fellow West Midlands clubs Wolverhampton Wanderers and West Bromwich Albion. According to a 2003 Football Fans Census survey, Aston Villa fans thought of Birmingham City as their main rivals, though this was not always the case.

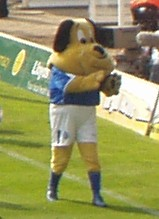
Birmingham City mascot Beau Brummie

Birmingham's supporters are generally referred to as "Bluenoses" in the media and by the fans themselves; the name is also used in a derogatory manner by fans of other clubs. A piece of public sculpture in the form of a ten-times-life-size head lying on a mound near the St Andrew's ground, Ondré Nowakowski's Sleeping Iron Giant, has been repeatedly defaced with blue paint on its nose. Between 1994 and 1997, the club mascot took the form of a blue nose, though it is now a dog named Beau Brummie, a play on the name Beau Brummell and Brummie, the slang word for a person from Birmingham, and his girlfriend Belle. Beau Brummie was originally introduced in October 1966, with name suggested by Blues staff member Dennis Gilbert and design created by John Barnett, who had recently devised World Cup Willie. Blues' mascot for 25 years - "Kipper" (Len Arnold), a gentleman dressed in blue and white coat and tails - had had to retire 18 months before.

A number of supporters' clubs are affiliated to the football club, both in England and abroad. An action group was formed in 1991 to protest against chairman Samesh Kumar, the club blamed an internet petition for the collapse of the purchase of player Lee Bowyer in 2005, and antipathy towards the board provoked hostile chanting and a pitch invasion after the last match of the 2007–08 season, but when the club was in financial difficulties, supporters contributed to schemes which funded the purchase of players Brian Roberts in 1984 and Paul Peschisolido in 1992. A supporters' trust was formed under the auspices of Supporters Direct in 2012.

There have been several fanzines published by supporters. Made in Brum, first issued in 2000, was the only one regularly on sale in 2013. The Zulu began some years earlier and ran for at least 16 seasons. The hooligan firm associated with the club, the Zulu Warriors, were unusual in that they had multi-racial membership at a time when many such firms had associations with racist or right-wing groups.

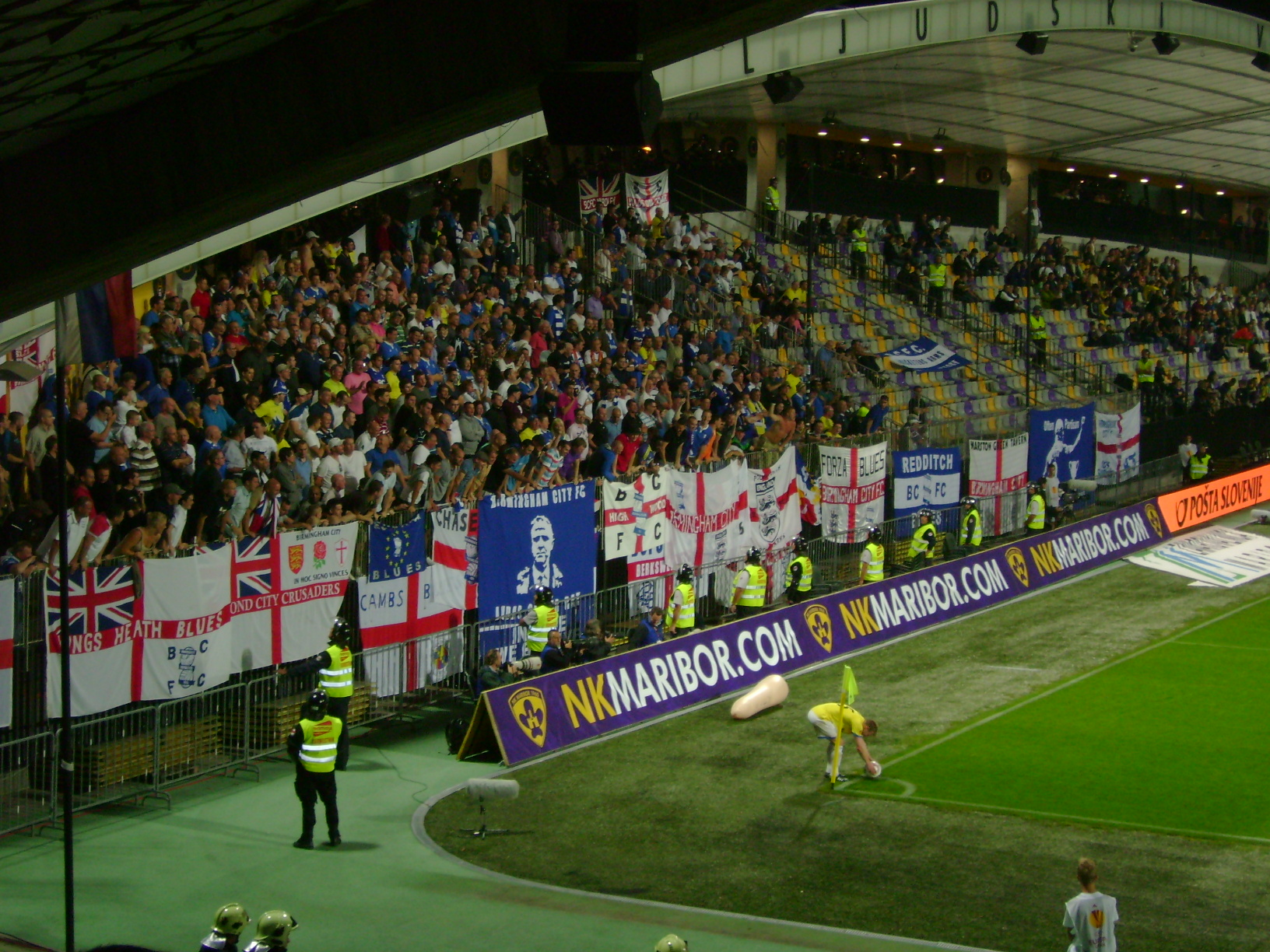
Visiting Birmingham fans during the club's first away appearance in group stage of the UEFA Europa League in 2011

The fans' anthem, an adaptation of Harry Lauder's "Keep Right On To The End of the Road", was adopted during the 1956 FA Cup campaign. The Times's football correspondent described in his Cup final preview how

the Birmingham clans swept their side along to Wembley – the first side ever to reach a final without once playing at home – on the wings of the song "Keep right on to the end of the road".

Player Alex Govan is credited with popularising the song, by singing it on the coach on the way to the quarter-final and when he revealed in an interview that it was his favourite.

In the build-up to the 1956 FA Cup semi-final with Sunderland I was interviewed by the press and happened to let slip that my favourite song was Harry Lauder's old music hall number "Keep Right on to the End of the Road". I thought no more about it, but when the third goal went in at Hillsborough the Blues fans all started singing it. It was the proudest moment of my life.

== Ownership ==
Small Heath F.C. became a limited company in 1888; its first share issue was to the value of £650. The board was made up of local businessmen and dignitaries until 1965, when the club was sold to Clifford Coombs. By the mid-1980s the club was in financial trouble. Control passed from the Coombs family to former Walsall chairman Ken Wheldon, who cut costs, made redundancies, and sold off assets, including the club's training ground. Still unable to make the club pay, Wheldon sold it to the Kumar brothers, owners of a clothing chain. Debt was still increasing when matters came to a head; the collapse of the Bank of Credit and Commerce International (BCCI) put the Kumars' businesses into receivership. The club continued in administration for four months until Sport Newspapers' proprietor David Sullivan bought the Kumars' 84% holding for £700,000 from BCCI's liquidator in March 1993. Birmingham City plc, of which the football club was a wholly owned subsidiary, was floated on the Alternative Investment Market (AIM) in 1997 with an issue of 15 million new shares, raising £7.5 million of new investment. It made a pre-tax profit of £4.3M in the year ending 31 August 2008.

In July 2007, Hong Kong businessman Carson Yeung, via the Hong Kong Stock Exchange (SEHK)-listed company Grandtop International Holdings Limited (GIH), bought 29.9% of the plc from its directors. Although his intention to take full control of the club initially came to nothing, GIH completed the purchase in October 2009 at a total cost of £81.5M, re-registered the club as a private company, and renamed the holding company Birmingham International Holdings (BIH).

Trading in BIH shares was suspended in June 2011 after Yeung's arrest on charges of money-laundering. Publication of financial results was repeatedly delayed, which led the Football League to impose a transfer embargo, and offers for the club were entertained from 2012 onwards. After Yeung resigned his positions with both club and company in early 2014, share trading resumed, and following his conviction, efforts intensified to dispose of the club, which had to be done piecemeal in order to retain BIH's share listing.

Going into 2015, the Football League made public their concerns over Yeung's attempts to impose his choice of directors on the BIHL board despite his conviction disqualifying him from exerting influence over a club. Relationships became increasingly factional, as illustrated by the failure of three directors, including the club's de facto chief executive Panos Pavlakis, to gain re-election, followed the next day by their reinstatement. On 17 February, the board voluntarily appointed receivers from accountants Ernst & Young to take over management of the company. Their statement stressed that no winding-up petition had been issued and the company was not in liquidation.

In June 2015, the receivers struck deals with the previous major shareholders such that legal action against them would be dropped in return for their agreement not to obstruct any transfer of ownership to their preferred bidder, the British Virgin Islands-registered investment vehicle Trillion Trophy Asia (TTA), wholly owned by Chinese businessman Paul Suen Cho Hung, who in turn agreed that the company would not be sold on within two years. The process completed in October 2016, leaving TTA owning 50.64% of BIH's share capital, a level of ownership that required them to make an offer for the remainder.

To keep the company running, TTA arranged loans which it settled with discounted shares to the same value; the process of creating such shares diluted the percentage holding of all shareholders. Attempts to diversify the company's holdings to make it less reliant on the football club were similarly funded. To reduce the club's losses in light of breaches of the EFL's Profitability and Sustainability Regulations, the stadium was sold for £22.8 million to Birmingham City Stadium Ltd, a new company wholly owned by the football club's parent, and would be leased back to the club, In December 2020, 21.64% of the club and 25% of Birmingham City Stadium were sold to Vong Pech's Oriental Rainbow, and in April 2021, the remaining 75% of the stadium was sold.

A June 2022 attempt to purchase the club by a group fronted by former Watford owner Laurence Bassini, involving financier Keith Harris and with money loaned by David Sullivan, came to nothing. A consortium led by fashion industry businessman Paul Richardson and Argentine former footballer Maxi López announced in July that they were close to completing the purchase of a stake in the club, and later confirmed that they were providing operating funds, but pulled out in December citing a failure to agree revisions to the original terms of agreement; in April 2023, Richardson, López and their proposed chief executive, former Charlton Athletic chairman Matt Southall, were sanctioned by the EFL after admitting breaching regulations by taking effective control of the club without approval.

In April 2023, Birmingham Sports Holdings confirmed letters of intent had been signed to sell 24% of Birmingham City plc shares held by themselves and the 21.64% owned by Oriental Rainbow, as well as the whole of Birmingham City Stadium Ltd, to a then unnamed potential purchaser, definitive agreements to be reached within a two-month exclusivity period. The purchaser was named as Shelby Companies Ltd, a subsidiary of asset management company Knighthead Capital Management fronted by Tom Wagner, Knighthead's co-founder and co-CEO. The agreements were subject to approval by the English Football League (EFL), which was forthcoming in early June, and by the Hong Kong Stock Exchange (HKSE), and an extraordinary general meeting (EGM) on 13 July voted overwhelmingly to accept. Although BSH retain 51% of the shares, Wagner confirmed that Shelby were "responsible for the operations of the club moving forward" and that "nothing about the way the transaction is structured will prevent us from obtaining the long-term goals we have for the club." That 51% was sold to Shelby in November 2025.

== Honours ==
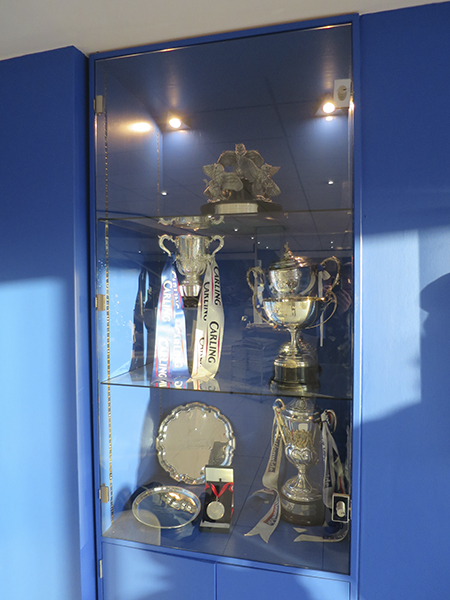
Trophy cabinet with the Carling Cup trophy

Birmingham City's honours include the following:

League

- Second Division / First Division / Championship (level 2)
  - Champions: 1892–93, 1920–21, 1947–48, 1954–55
  - Runners-up: 1893–94, 1900–01, 1902–03, 1971–72, 1984–85, 2006–07, 2008–09
  - Play-off winners: 2002
- Third Division / Second Division / League One (level 3)
  - Champions: 1994–95, 2024–25
  - Runners-up: 1991–92

Cup

- FA Cup
  - Runners-up: 1930–31, 1955–56
- Football League Cup
  - Winners: 1962–63, 2010–11
  - Runners-up: 2000–01
- Inter-Cities Fairs Cup
  - Runners-up: 1958–60, 1960–61
- Associate Members' Cup / Football League Trophy / EFL Trophy
  - Winners: 1990–91, 1994–95
  - Runners-up: 2024–25
- Birmingham Senior Cup
  - Winners: 1905

Small Heath first entered the Birmingham Senior Cup in 1878–79 – ten years before the foundation of the Football League – and won for the first time in 1905, defeating West Bromwich Albion 7–2 in the final. Its importance declined with the increase in League fixtures, and from the 1905–06 season onwards, Birmingham fielded teams containing reserve-team players.

- Football League South (wartime)
  - Champions: 1945–46

Preparatory to the Football League resuming in 1946–47, the First and Second Division clubs from the last pre-war season were divided geographically between the Leagues North and South for 1945–46. Going into the last day of the season, Aston Villa were top of League South but had finished their programme two points (one win) ahead of the chasers but with a worse goal average. Charlton Athletic were second, above Birmingham by 0.002 of a goal. While Charlton could only draw at home to Wolverhampton Wanderers, Birmingham won away at Luton Town, so claimed the title by 0.3 of a goal.

== Records and statistics ==
Chart of English Football League performance of Birmingham City F.C. since the 1892–93 season

Birmingham achieved their highest finishing position, of sixth in the top flight, in the 1955–56 First Division. Frank Womack holds the record for Birmingham league appearances, having played 491 matches between 1908 and 1928, closely followed by Gil Merrick with 485 between 1946 and 1959. If all senior competitions are included, Merrick has 551, less closely followed by Womack's 515 which is the record for an outfield player. The player who won most international caps while at the club is Maik Taylor with 58 for Northern Ireland.

The goalscoring record is held by Joe Bradford, with 249 league goals, 267 altogether, scored between 1920 and 1935; no other player comes close. Walter Abbott holds the records for the most goals scored in a season, in 1898–99, with 34 league goals in the Second Division and 42 goals in total.

The club's widest victory margin in the league was 12–0, a scoreline which they achieved once in the Football Alliance, against Nottingham Forest in 1899, and twice in the Second Division, against Walsall Town Swifts in 1892 and Doncaster Rovers in 1903. They have lost a league match by an eight-goal margin on eight occasions: twice in the Football Alliance and five times in the First Division, all away from home, and once at home, beaten 8–0 by AFC Bournemouth in the Championship in 2014. Their record FA Cup win was 10–0 against Druids in the fourth qualifying round of the 1899 competition; their record FA Cup defeat was 7–0 at home to Liverpool in the 2006 quarter-final.

Birmingham's home attendance record was set at the fifth-round FA Cup tie against Everton on 11 February 1939. It is variously recorded as 66,844 or 67,341. The highest transfer fee received for a Birmingham player is, according to the Sky Sports website, "a guaranteed £25 million up front" received in July 2020 from Borussia Dortmund for Jude Bellingham, which made him the most expensive 17-year-old in world football; the deal also included add-ons "worth 'several millions more'". The highest fee paid, for English forward Jay Stansfield, who joined from Fulham in August 2024 after a successful loan spell at Birmingham the previous season, is variously reported as an initial £10m, £12m or £15m, plus bonuses and a sell-on clause.

== Players ==
=== First-team squad ===
As of 23 October 2026

Note: Flags indicate national team as defined under FIFA eligibility rules; some limited exceptions apply. Players may hold more than one non-FIFA nationality.

No.	Pos.	Nation	Player
1	GK	ENG	James Beadle (on loan from Brighton & Hove Albion)
2	DF	ENG	Ethan Laird
3	DF	ENG	Lee Buchanan
4	DF	AUT	Christoph Klarer (captain)
5	DF	GER	Phil Neumann
7	MF	ESP	Carlos Vicente
8	MF	KOR	Paik Seung-ho
9	FW	DEN	August Priske
10	MF	JAM	Demarai Gray
11	MF	SCO	Scott Wright
12	MF	SCO	Marc Leonard
14	MF	COL	Jhon Solís
16	FW	ENG	Patrick Roberts
17	FW	CAN	Liam Millar (on loan from Hull City)

No.	Pos.	Nation	Player
18	MF	ENG	Max Bird
19	MF	ENG	Taylor Gardner-Hickman
20	DF	ENG	Alex Cochrane
21	GK	ENG	Ryan Allsop
23	DF	ENG	Dael Fry
24	MF	JPN	Tomoki Iwata
25	DF	USA	Kristoffer Lund
26	DF	NGR	Bright Osayi-Samuel
28	FW	ENG	Jay Stansfield
30	GK	ENG	Brad Mayo
32	FW	ARG	Luis Vázquez
33	FW	GER	Marvin Ducksch
41	MF	ENG	Cobi Maddox

=== Out on loan ===
Note: Flags indicate national team as defined under FIFA eligibility rules; some limited exceptions apply. Players may hold more than one non-FIFA nationality.

No.	Pos.	Nation	Player
27	MF	JPN	Kanya Fujimoto (on loan to Tokyo Verdy)
39	FW	ENG	Briar Bateman (on loan to Oxford City)
40	MF	ZIM	Menzi Mazwi (on loan to Buxton)

=== Retired numbers ===
In appreciation of Jude Bellingham's contribution in a short time with the first team – the club's youngest debutant, at 16 years and 38 days, and youngest goalscorer, he completed a full season in the Championship before becoming Birmingham's record transfer and the world's most expensive 17-year-old, "showing what can be achieved through talent, hard work and dedication" while retaining a "caring, humble and engaging off-the-field demeanour" – the club retired his number 22 shirt "to remember one of our own and to inspire others."

=== Birmingham City Women ===
Birmingham City Ladies Football Club was formed in 1968. The first team worked their way through the leagues until promoted to the FA Women's Premier League in 2002. After Birmingham City F.C. withdrew financial support in 2005, the club were only able to continue because of a personal donation. They re-affiliated with Birmingham City in 2010, were founder members of the FA WSL the following year, and won the FA Women's Cup in 2012. A second-place finish in the 2012 FA WSL earned them qualification for the 2013–14 Champions League, in which they reached the semi-final. After TTA took over Birmingham City F.C. in November 2016, the women's club became an integral part of the organisation. It was formally renamed Birmingham City Women in 2018, and would be known as plain Birmingham City except where that would cause confusion with the men's team.

== Club officials ==
Owners:

As of October 2023

- Birmingham Sports Holdings 51.7%
- Shelby Companies Ltd 45.96%

Board:

As of January 2025

- Chairman: Tom Wagner
- CEO: Jeremy Dale
- Directors: Matthew Alvarez • Andrew Shannahan • Kyle Kneisly • Wenqing Zhao • Gannan Zheng

Football staff:

As of 29 September 2024

- Director of football: Craig Gardner
- Manager: Chris Davies
- Assistant manager: Ben Petty
- Coaching staff: Tom Huddlestone • Nathan Gardiner
- Goalkeeper coach: Maik Taylor
- Head of physical performance: Sean Rush

== Managers ==
Gil Merrick was the first Birmingham manager to win a major trophy, the League Cup in 1963. Merrick also led the club to the Inter-Cities Fairs Cup final in 1961, following Pat Beasley who had done the same in 1960. Leslie Knighton took the club to the final of the FA Cup in 1931; Arthur Turner did likewise in 1956, as well as taking charge of the club's highest league finish, sixth place in the 1955–56 First Division. Birmingham reached the 2001 Football League Cup Final under Trevor Francis, whose successor as permanent manager, Steve Bruce, twice achieved promotion to the Premier League. Birmingham won the League Cup for the second time under Alex McLeish in 2011. The 1966 World Cup-winning manager, Sir Alf Ramsey, took charge of the club briefly in 1977.

== Sources ==
- Gall, Caroline (2006). Zulus: Black, White and Blue: the Story of the Zulu Warriors Football Firm. Milo Books. ISBN 978-1-903854-53-2.
- Goodyear, David; Matthews, Tony (1988). Aston Villa A Complete Record 1875–1988. Derby: Breedon Books. ISBN 0-907969-37-2.
- Holden, Jim (2000). Stan Cullis: The Iron Manager. Derby: Breedon Books. ISBN 1-85983-211-3.
- Jawad, Hyder (2005). Strange Magic. Birmingham City v Aston Villa. Birmingham Post. ASIN B001DPB4V0.
- Lewis, Peter, ed. (2000). Keeping right on since 1875. The Official History of Birmingham City Football Club. Lytham: Arrow. ISBN 1-900722-12-7.
- Matthews, Tony (1995). Birmingham City: A Complete Record. Derby: Breedon Books. ISBN 978-1-85983-010-9.
- Matthews, Tony (October 2000). The Encyclopedia of Birmingham City Football Club 1875–2000. Cradley Heath: Britespot. ISBN 978-0-9539288-0-4.
- Radnedge, Keir (1998). "Inter-Cities Fairs/UEFA Cup". The Complete Encyclopedia of Football. Carlton Books. ISBN 978-1-85833-979-5.
- Rollin, Jack, ed. (1990). Rothmans Football Yearbook 1990–91. London: Queen Anne Press. ISBN 0-356-17911-7.
- Rollin, Jack (2005). Soccer at War 1939–45. London: Headline. ISBN 978-0-7553-1431-7.
- Rollin, Glenda; Rollin, Jack, eds. (2010). Sky Sports Football Yearbook 2010–2011 (41st ed.). London: Headline. ISBN 978-0-7553-6107-6.
