= Tom Wagner (financier) =

American financier

- Born: Thomas Allen Wagner III; July 1969 (age 56)
- Education: Villanova University; Columbia Business School
- Occupation: Financier
- Known for: Co-founder of Knighthead Capital Management

Co-owner – Birmingham City
- Incumbent
- Assumed office 13 July 2023

Thomas Allen Wagner III (born July 1969) is an American financier who is best known as the co-founder and co-CEO of Knighthead Capital Management.

He is also the current co-owner and chairman of association football club Birmingham City.

== Career ==
=== Education ===
Wagner graduated from Villanova University in 1992 with a Bachelor of Science in Accounting. He later graduated Beta Gamma Sigma from Columbia Business School in 1999.

=== Knighthead Capital Management ===
In 2008, he co-founded Knighthead Capital Management LLC alongside Ara Cohen. The company is an investment firm that specialises in "fundamental analysis, operational and financial turnarounds and risk management".

=== Birmingham City ===
On 13 July 2023, Shelby Companies Limited (SCL), a subsidiary of Knighthead, became co-owners of association football club Birmingham City. SCL currently own 96.64% of the EFL Championship side. As a result of the takeover, Wagner became the club's chairman. A month later, on 3 August 2023, former NFL player Tom Brady "entered a partnership" with SCL as a minority owner of Birmingham City.

Since the takeover, plans to replace the club's current home of St Andrew's have been in the works. On 9 April 2024, SCL acquired a plot of land in Bordesley Green to use for a new stadium. The proposed New Birmingham City Stadium will host 62,000 spectators and be surrounded by a "Sports Quarter", which will be used by all of the club's teams. The project has an optimistic completion date of 2029.

Despite relegation from the EFL Championship in Wagner's first season at Birmingham City, the club was promoted straight back up as champions of EFL League One the following year.

=== Las Vegas Raiders ===
In May 2023, Wagner and retired quarterback, Tom Brady, entered into an agreement to purchase 10 percent of the Las Vegas Raiders from majority owner Mark Davis. The original deal was delayed due to concerns from NFL owners that Brady and Wagner were receiving too big a discount. In October 2024, a revised agreement was approved by NFL owners, with Wagner and Brady purchasing a five percent stake in ownership for a total of $220 million.

== Personal life ==
On 11 February 2026, Birmingham City revealed that Wagner had suffered a stroke. The announcement said that as part of his recovery he would be "stepping back" from day-to-day involvement at the club for the time being.
