= Keith R. Harris =

British banker

Keith Harris
- Born: Keith Reginald Harris; 11 April 1953 (age 73); Manchester, England, UK
- Education: PhD in Economics
- Occupation: Financier
- Employer(s): Keith Harris & Partners

Keith Reginald Harris (born 11 April 1953) is a London-based investment banker and financier with a 30-year career as a senior corporate finance and takeover advisor, having held senior executive positions at leading institutions Morgan Grenfell, Drexel Burnham Lambert, Apax Partners, and HSBC Investment Bank. He is a private equity investor with interests in varied private equity holdings in financials, media, and sport.

He was previously chairman of the Football League and director of Wembley National Stadium Ltd., the company which owns Wembley Stadium. And in October 2016, he became a director of Everton F.C.

== Background ==
Dr Harris has advised on hundreds of debt and equity issues as well as complex cross border transactions as a senior executive at leading global banks. He has also acted for many noteworthy clients and been involved in high-profile transactions such as the £13.5bn hostile bid for British American Tobacco by Kerry Packer, Sir James Goldsmith, and Lord Rothschild. Harris continues to act for rich families from the Middle East, and India on sport and media related acquisitions.

Harris was President of Morgan Grenfell Inc. (now owned by Deutsche Bank) as well as the youngest ever director at the British investment bank Morgan, Grenfell & Co. The bank was founded by the American George Peabody in 1838 as the UK branch of his US bank which subsequently became known as J.P. Morgan & Co. In 1904, Edward Grenfell was made a partner in the firm and in 1909 it underwent a change of name to incorporate Grenfell, therefore becoming Morgan, Grenfell & Co. Harris spent eight years altogether at Morgan Grenfell.

Harris departed Morgan, Grenfell & Co. for an American investment bank, accepting a position as managing director and Head of International Corporate Finance at the American firm Drexel Burnham Lambert. After the bank was forced into bankruptcy in 1990, Harris moved to the private equity sector.

Between 1990 and 1994, Harris was Chief Executive of Apax Partners Corporate Finance Ltd (previously Patricof & Co. and MMG). This was the corporate finance advisory division of Apax, a private equity asset management firm which was founded by Maurice Tchenio, Sir Ronald Cohen, and American Alan Patricof.

Harris was recruited by Sir William Purves, then Chairman of HSBC Group, to HSBC Investment Bank PLC where he was global Chief Executive between 1994 and 1999. At HSBC Harris oversaw a staff of approximately 13,500 in forty six countries. Under his leadership, HSBC Investment Bank achieved an average annual return on equity of more than 20% with over 30% in some years, and reported over £400 million in annual profit.

In 1999, Harris left HSBC to pursue a number of interests as chairman or non-executive director of a range of public and private companies including Halfords plc. He became Executive Chairman and an investor of the UK investment bank Seymour Pierce, which was founded in 1803. This began in 2003 when he organised a buyout group that acquired the bank. Harris brought his sport M&A practice to the bank and ran the advisory business through the bank making it the leading strategic financial adviser to top-level professional football teams, advising on dozens of acquisitions including Chelsea, Newcastle, West Ham, Aston Villa, Fulham, and Manchester City among others. Seymour Pierce, now part of an American securities firm called Cantor Fitzgerald, had been the number one ranked investment bank in London for LSE AIM listed companies. The firm had been a registered Nominated Advisor, or NOMAD, with authority delegated by the London Stock Exchange to regulate and supervise companies admitted to trade publicly on the Alternative Investment Market (AIM) segment of the LSE. Until its take over by Cantor, Seymour Pierce had been the primary regulator for approximately 80 public companies on AIM.

Harris has also been active in the insurance sector, since 1999 as a non-executive director of Benfield Group plc., a reinsurance intermediary and capital advisory business, until its $1.75 billion acquisition by Aon Re Global in 2009 (NYSE: AON). He joined the Board of Cooper Gay (Holdings) Ltd as non-executive director in July 2009 and was appointed as non executive director of Cooper Gay Swett & Crawford Ltd (now Ed Broking) in 2010, on completion of the combined Cooper Gay Swett & Crawford group.

Other business ventures include co-founding and becoming the Chairman of AS Sports Management, a UK based football club consultancy, and joining the board of MeiraGTx, a leading US based gene therapy development company, in 2015.

== Football clients ==
Harris has been publicly associated with a number of ultra high-net-worth clients. These clients include Roman Abramovich of Russia, former Prime Minister Thaksin Shinawatra of Thailand, the American billionaire Randy Lerner, and the owner of Fulham football club and former owner of Harrods, Mohamed Fayed.

In 2013, Harris concentrated his business as an independent consultant to owners of football clubs. That year he advised on the sale of Fulham Football Club by Fayed to Shahid Khan, the US billionaire. Khan is the owner of the Jacksonville Jaguars American Football team, which he purchased in 2011, having made his estimated £1.7bn fortune in the manufacture of car parts. He has subsequently advised on several transactions including when an investment by a group of US private equity investors was made into Crystal Palace Football Club, the sale of Swansea City AFC to a number of US private individuals, and the sale of a large minority stake in Everton to Farhad Moshiri.

Harris advised Forbes 400 member Richard Desmond on the £125 million acquisition of the Express Group, the media company that publishes both the Daily and Sunday Express newspapers.

Together with German investment banker Jan Huber he represented American billionaire, Randy Lerner, in the acquisition of Aston Villa football club, one of the oldest clubs in the world.

In 2010, he advised an unnamed Middle Eastern client on the attempted acquisition of Liverpool F.C. He has acted for numerous other Middle Eastern clients from several countries in the region. He is believed to have developed many of his Middle East contacts whilst CEO of HSBC Investment Bank. The bank has long roots in the region, having acquired The British Bank of the Middle East in 1959 (now called HSBC Bank Middle East Limited) which was established in London in September 1889 originally as the Imperial Bank of Persia.

In October 2016, Harris was appointed to the board of Everton F.C.

== Red Knights ==
In 2010, a cabal of Britain's leading businessmen calling themselves the Red Knights met at the offices of Freshfields Bruckhaus Deringer, the law firm, to attempt to remove Malcolm Glazer, Manchester United's owner. The group then met with Harris to broker the takeover. Harris, a lifelong Manchester United fan, became a member of the Red Knights who sought to buy the club from the Glazer family, the controversial American owners of the football club.

The leading figures of the Red Knights were: Jim O'Neill, a former HSBC investment bank chief executive and chief economist at Goldman Sachs; Paul Marshall, a partner at the hedge fund Marshall Wace; Richard Hytner of advertising agency Saatchi and Saatchi; lawyer Mark Rawlinson, a partner in Freshfields' corporate practice, who advised United during the Glazer takeover negotiations; and Harris himself.

Harris claimed the group wanted "to do something for the good of Manchester United and the good of football." In the past, he has been involved in the takeovers of West Ham, Manchester City and Aston Villa and he has been extremely critical of the debt that the Glazer family brought to Manchester United.

== Education ==
Harris obtained his Doctorate in Economics in 1977 and embarked on a career in investment banking.
