= Chris Davies (football coach) =

Association football coach (born 1985)

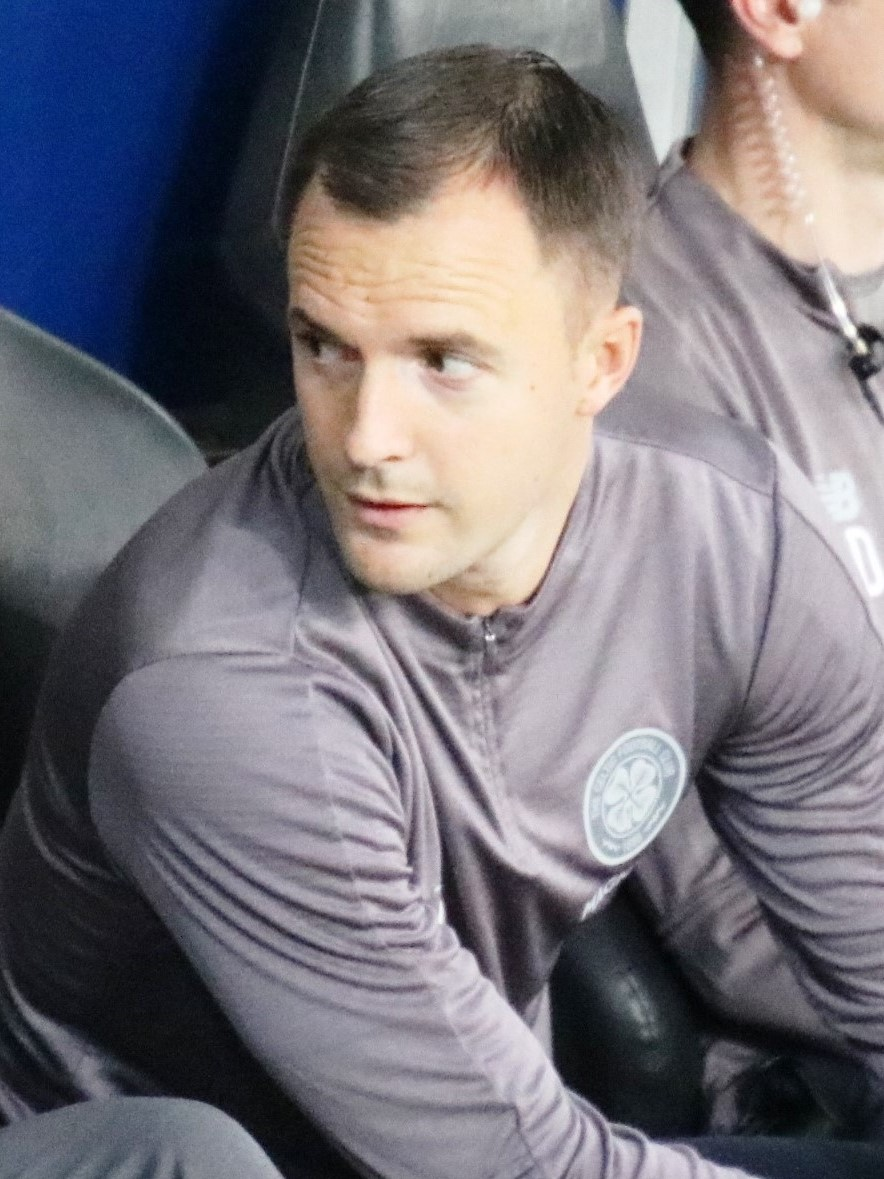
- Davies as assistant manager of Celtic in 2018

Personal information
- Full name: Christopher Paul Davies
- Date of birth: 27 March 1985 (age 41)
- Place of birth: Watford, England
- Position: Midfielder

Team information
- Current team: Birmingham City (manager)

Youth career
- 2001–2004: Reading

International career
Years	Team	Apps	(Gls)
2001	Wales U17		
2002	Wales U18		
2003	Wales U19		

Managerial career
- 2024–: Birmingham City

Christopher Paul Davies (born 27 March 1985) is a professional football coach and former player who is the manager of EFL Championship club Birmingham City.

Davies was a youth player for Reading and Wales before retiring in 2004, aged 19. He became a football coach, initially coaching youth teams in England and abroad, before becoming assistant to Brendan Rodgers at Swansea City, Liverpool, Celtic and Leicester City.

After a season at Tottenham Hotspur as the senior assistant coach to Ange Postecoglou, Davies became manager of Birmingham City in 2024.

== Early life and playing career ==
Christopher Paul Davies was born on 27 March 1985 in Watford, England. He qualified to play football for Wales through his Welsh father. He was capped for the Wales Under-17, 18 and 19 teams.

Davies signed with Reading, aged 16, where he captained the youth team coached by Brendan Rodgers. Despite appearing regularly for the Reading reserve team, Davies was forced to retire from professional football in 2004, aged 19, due to an arthritic condition in his foot.

== Coaching career ==
In 2004, Davies began studying for his UEFA coaching licences while also attending Loughborough University, where he obtained a first-class honours degree in Sport Science. He worked as a youth coach at Leicester City and also coached in the United States and New Zealand. While in New Zealand, Davies was a youth coach at Hawke's Bay United, where he worked under Jonathan and Bobby Gould.

In 2010, aged 25, Davies was recruited as an assistant to Brendan Rodgers at Swansea City. During his time at Swansea, Davies specialised in opposition analysis and tactics. In his first season, Swansea were promoted to the Premier League. After Swansea secured a second season in the Premier League, Davies was offered a coaching position with the club's reserve team.

Davies moved with Rodgers to Liverpool in June 2012 as the club's head of opposition analysis. In his second season, Liverpool finished second in the Premier League behind champions Manchester City. Davies left the club in October 2015 when Rodgers was replaced by Jürgen Klopp. During his time at Liverpool, Davies completed his UEFA Pro Licence, earning the qualification in 2015.

Following six months at Reading as a first-team coach in 2016, Davies joined Rodgers as his assistant manager at Scottish Premiership club Celtic. In their first season, Celtic won the domestic treble for only the fourth time in the club's history. Under Rodgers and Davies, Celtic broke their 100-year-old record for successive domestic games unbeaten, going 69 matches without defeat. They won the treble again in Davies's second season.

In February 2019, Davies moved with Rodgers to Leicester City, again as his assistant manager. They finished fifth in two consecutive seasons, missing out on UEFA Champions League qualification on the last day of both seasons, but won the 2021 FA Cup and the Community Shield. Davies left the club with Rodgers in April 2023.

On 27 June 2023, Davies was appointed as senior assistant coach to Ange Postecoglou at Tottenham Hotspur.

== Managerial career ==
=== Birmingham City ===
On 6 June 2024, he departed Tottenham Hotspur in order to become the manager of Birmingham City. He signed a four-year contract with the newly relegated EFL League One club.

Following an unbeaten month of thirteen points from five matches, Davies was named EFL League One Manager of the Month for February 2025, as Birmingham extended their lead at the top of the league.

By the end of the 2024–25 season, he had guided Birmingham City F.C. to promotion to the Championship at the first attempt, setting a new EFL points record of 111 and surpassing Reading F.C.’s long-standing 2005–06 benchmark for the highest points total in the league.

Due to his record-breaking debut season in football management, Davies won the League One Manager of the Year award.

== Coaching style ==
"Controlling the game with the ball will always be central to my philosophy but I want a degree of tactical flexibility to adapt to different opponents and different situations. I'm a pragmatic person, and I feel that transfers into my coaching."

— Davies on his coaching philosophy.

During his early career as a youth coach, Davies used futsal coaching to improve the technical development of players, including their ball control and passing. He then developed his tactical knowledge at Swansea and Liverpool, having worked in opposition analysis roles at both clubs.

At Celtic and Leicester, Davies's job was to "lead training on a day-to-day basis, managing the other coaches and working closely with the sports science department". His sessions included on-the-field training, as well as individual meetings with the players and video analysis.

Davies's coaching style has primarily been influenced by Brendan Rodgers, having worked with Rodgers at several clubs throughout his career. He also cites the work of Roberto Martínez and Paulo Sousa at Swansea, as well as the influence of Pep Guardiola on English football.

== Managerial statistics ==
As of match played 21 November 2026

Managerial record by team and tenure
Team	From	To	Record				
Team	From	To	P	W	D	L	Win %
Birmingham City	6 June 2024	Present	128	72	29	27	56.3
Total			128	72	29	27	56.3

== Honours ==
Birmingham City

- EFL League One: 2024–25
- EFL Trophy runner-up: 2024–25

Individual

- EFL League One Manager of the Month: February 2025, April 2025
- EFL League One Manager of the Season: 2024–25
