= 2023–24 FA Cup =

Football Association Challenge Cup
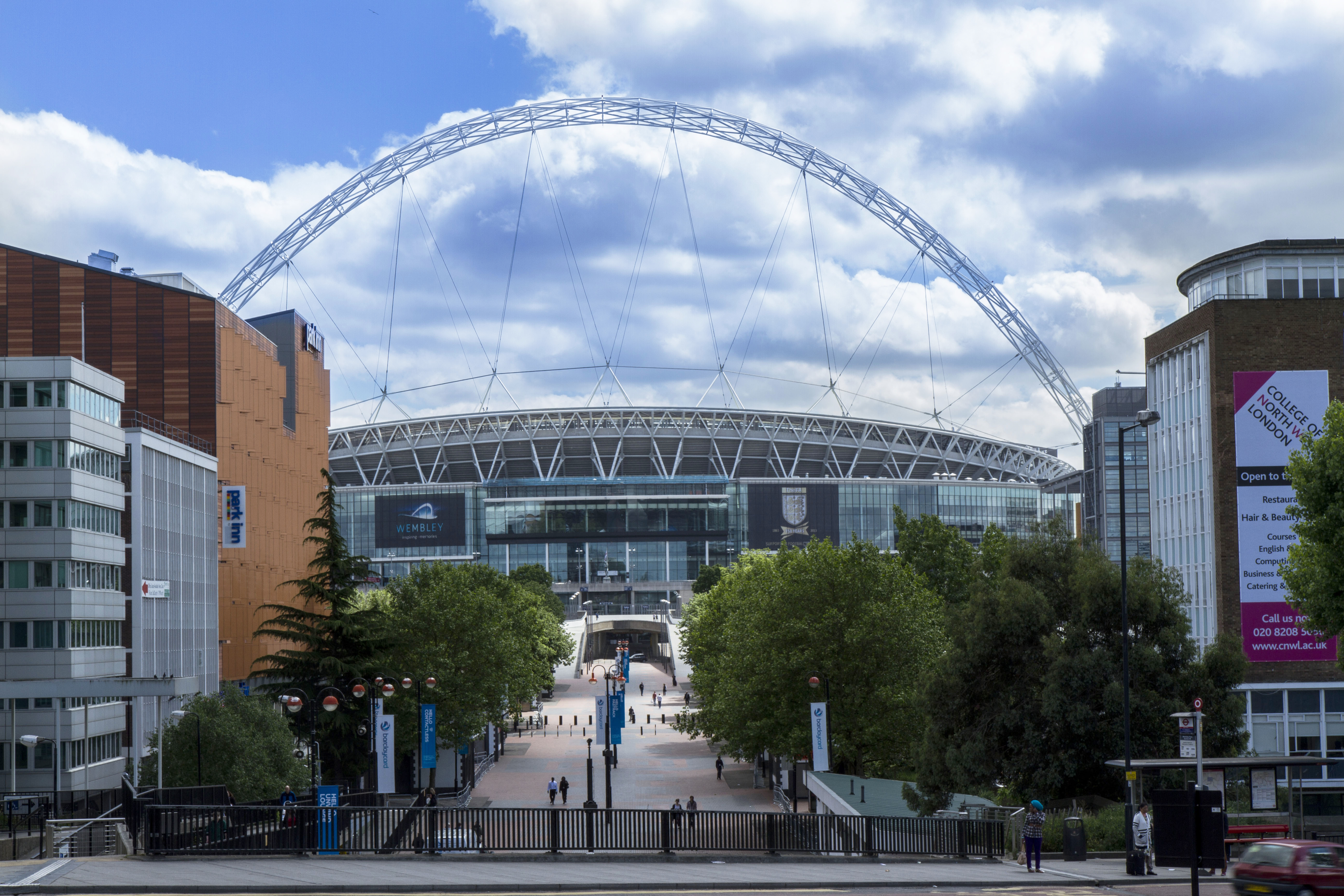
- Wembley Stadium hosted the final on 25 May 2024

Tournament details
- Country: England; Wales
- Dates: 3 November 2023 – 25 May 2024
- Teams: 732 (all); 640 (qualifying competition); 124 (main competition incl. 32 qualifiers)

Final positions
- Champions: Manchester United (13th title)
- Runners-up: Manchester City

Tournament statistics
- Matches played: 148
- Goals scored: 512 (3.46 per match)
- Attendance: 2,167,257 (14,644 per match)
- Top goal scorer(s): Ellis Simms; Sammie Szmodics (6 goals each)
- (Note: All statistics do not include qualifying play-offs)

The 2023–24 FA Cup was the 143rd season of the Football Association Challenge Cup, the oldest football tournament in the world. It was sponsored by Emirates and known as the Emirates FA Cup for sponsorship purposes.

The final was played on 25 May 2024 between defending champions Manchester City and local rivals Manchester United, a repeat of the previous final which Manchester City won 2–1. This made the final the first to feature the same teams in consecutive editions since the 1884–85 season. Manchester United beat Manchester City to clinch their 13th title in the competition. As the winners, Manchester United qualified for the 2024–25 UEFA Europa League league stage, as well as earned the right to play against the winners of the 2023–24 Premier League, Manchester City, in the 2024 FA Community Shield.

This was the last edition of the tournament to feature replays in the non-qualifying rounds, as well as the last one to have the final played after the end of the Premier League season. The changes were made as part of a six-year agreement between The Football Association and the Premier League due to pressure on the domestic calendar from expanded UEFA competitions, but were criticised since replays were cited as an important source of revenue for lower league clubs.

== Teams ==
The FA Cup is a knockout competition with 124 teams taking part from the first round proper, and all trying to reach the final at Wembley Stadium on 25 May 2024. The competition consisted of the 92 teams from the Football League system (20 teams from the Premier League and the 72 in total from the EFL Championship, EFL League One and EFL League Two) plus the 32 surviving teams out of 640 teams from the National League System that started the competition in the qualifying rounds.

All rounds were drawn randomly, usually either at the completion of the previous round discounting any replays or on the evening of the last televised game of a round being played, depending on television broadcasting rights.

The total prize fund for the competition was £22,269,800.

Round	Main date	Number of fixtures	Clubs remaining	New entries this round	Winner prize money	Loser prize money	Divisions entering this round
First round	Saturday 4 November 2023	40	124 → 84	48	£41,000	None	24 EFL League One teams 24 EFL League Two teams
Second round	Saturday 2 December 2023	20	84 → 64	None	£67,000	None	None
Third round	Saturday 6 January 2024	32	64 → 32	44	£105,000	None	20 Premier League teams 24 EFL Championship teams
Fourth round	Saturday 27 January 2024	16	32 → 16	None	£120,000	None	None
Fifth round	Wednesday 28 February 2024	8	16 → 8	None	£225,000	None	None
Quarter-finals	Saturday 16 March 2024	4	8 → 4	None	£450,000	None	None
Semi-finals	Saturday 20 April 2024	2	4 → 2	None	£1,000,000	£500,000	None
Final	Saturday 25 May 2024	1	2 → 1	None	£2,000,000	£1,000,000	None

== Qualifying ==
Teams that were not members of either the Premier League or English Football League competed in the qualifying rounds to secure one of 32 available places in the first round. The six-round qualifying competition began with the extra preliminary round on 4 August 2023 with the fourth and final qualifying round kicking off on Saturday 14 October.

The winners from the fourth qualifying round were Scarborough Athletic, Oldham Athletic, Marine, Worksop Town, AFC Fylde, Hereford, York City, Solihull Moors, Chesterfield, Alfreton Town, Whitby Town, Chester, Kidderminster Harriers, Gateshead, Curzon Ashton, Aldershot Town, Maidstone United, Ramsgate, Barnet, Woking, Horsham, Eastleigh, Yeovil Town, Bromley, Sheppey United, Maidenhead United, Chesham United, Worthing, Bracknell Town, Cray Valley Paper Mills, Slough Town and Boreham Wood.

Sheppey United, who had been entering the Cup more-or-less continuously since 1892, was the only team in this season's tournament appearing in the competition proper for the first time, although phoenix club Scarborough Athletic was featuring at this stage for the first time in their own right following the liquidation of Scarborough FC in 2007. Of the others, Chester had last appeared in the first round in 2014-15, Ramsgate had last done so in 2005-06, Whitby Town had last done so in 2003-04, Worksop Town had last done so in 2001-02 and Worthing had last done so in 1999-2000.

== First round ==
The first round saw the 32 winners from the fourth qualifying round joined by the 48 clubs from League One and League Two. The draw was made on 15 October 2023 by Paul Parker and Jobi McAnuff live on ITV1 and STV.

- The round included three teams from the eighth tier, Cray Valley Paper Mills, Ramsgate and Sheppey United, the lowest-ranked teams remaining in the competition.
- The Swindon Town-Aldershot Town match at the County Ground was the first in which a non-league club scored seven goals against Football League opponents since Crystal Palace's controversial win over Chelsea in the third qualifying round of 1905-06.

Number of teams per tier still in competition
Premier League (Note: Premier League and Championship teams joined the competition in the third round.)	EFL Championship	EFL League One	EFL League Two	Non-League	Total
20 / 20	24 / 24	24 / 24	24 / 24	32 / 32	124 / 124

3 November 2023	Sheppey United (8)	1–4	Walsall (4)	Minster
19:45 GMT	Bessey-Saldanha 21'	Report	James-Taylor 32'; Knowles 53'; Tierney 64'; Hutchinson 87'	Stadium: Holm Park; Attendance: 1,450; Referee: Tom Reeves

3 November 2023	Barnsley (3)	3–3	Horsham (7)	Barnsley
19:45 GMT	Watters 14'; Jaló 45+1'; De Gevigney 64'	Report	Fenelon 22'; Hammond 38' (pen.); Richards 81'	Stadium: Oakwell; Attendance: 4,463; Referee: Ben Toner

14 November 2023 Replay	Horsham (7)	Walkover (Note: Despite winning the replay 3-0, Barnsley were expelled from the competition for fielding an ineligible player in the match, with Horsham being fully reinstated and given a bye directly to the next round.)	Barnsley (3)	Horsham
19:30 GMT		Report	Cadden 3'; McAtee 10', 27'	Stadium: Hop Oast Stadium; Attendance: 3,000; Referee: Sunny Singh Gill

4 November 2023	Northampton Town (3)	1–3	Barrow (4)	Northampton
13:30 GMT	Pinnock 29'	Report	Acquah 9'; White 52'; Whitfield 72'	Stadium: Sixfields Stadium; Attendance: 3,187; Referee: Paul Howard

4 November 2023	Curzon Ashton (6)	0–1	Barnet (5)	Ashton-under-Lyne
15:00 GMT		Report	Kabamba 15'	Stadium: Tameside Stadium; Attendance: 626; Referee: Gareth Rhodes

4 November 2023	Alfreton Town (6)	2–0	Worthing (6)	Alfreton
15:00 GMT	Newall 73'; Digie 87'	Report		Stadium: North Street; Attendance: 1,043; Referee: Paul Marsden

4 November 2023	Bolton Wanderers (3)	4–0	Solihull Moors (5)	Horwich
15:00 GMT	Santos 39'; Maghoma 52'; Forrester 69'; Charles 87'	Report		Stadium: Toughsheet Community Stadium; Attendance: 5,523; Referee: Scott Simpson

4 November 2023	Exeter City (3)	0–2	Wigan Athletic (3)	Exeter
15:00 GMT		Report	Aasgaard 58'; Sessegnon 87'	Stadium: St James Park; Attendance: 3,512; Referee: Craig Hicks

4 November 2023	Leyton Orient (3)	3–1	Carlisle United (3)	Leyton
15:00 GMT	Pigott 11' (pen.); Drinan 65'; Sotiriou 90+1'	Report	Garner 50'	Stadium: Brisbane Road; Attendance: 3,808; Referee: Seb Stockbridge

4 November 2023	Hereford (6)	0–2	Gillingham (4)	Hereford
15:00 GMT		Report	Clarke 23'; Nichols 88'	Stadium: Edgar Street; Attendance: 4,376; Referee: Ollie Yates

4 November 2023	Oxford United (3)	2–0	Maidenhead United (5)	Oxford
15:00 GMT	Bodin 15', 83'	Report		Stadium: Kassam Stadium; Attendance: 4,094; Referee: Dale Baines

4 November 2023	Newport County (4)	2–0	Oldham Athletic (5)	Newport
15:00 GMT	McLoughlin 20', 80'	Report		Stadium: Rodney Parade; Attendance: 2,541; Referee: David Middleton

4 November 2023	Swindon Town (4)	4–7	Aldershot Town (5)	Swindon
15:00 GMT	Kemp 75', 78'; Austin 90+2', 90+5'	Report	Barham 1', 4', 58'; Stokes 9'; Tolaj 45+3', 51'; Harries 47' (pen.)	Stadium: County Ground; Attendance: 6,372; Referee: Carl Brook

4 November 2023	Marine (7)	1–5	Harrogate Town (4)	Crosby
15:00 GMT	Doyle 26'	Report	Odoh 5'; Folarin 28', 53'; McDonald 71'; Dooley 89'	Stadium: Rossett Park; Attendance: 2,071; Referee: Michael Barlow

4 November 2023	Port Vale (3)	0–0	Burton Albion (3)	Stoke-on-Trent
15:00 GMT		Report		Stadium: Vale Park; Attendance: 4,245; Referee: Simon Mather

14 November 2023 Replay	Burton Albion (3)	0–2	Port Vale (3)	Burton upon Trent
19:45 GMT		Report	Massey 31'; Cass 82'	Stadium: Pirelli Stadium; Attendance: 2,533; Referee: Adam Herczeg

4 November 2023	Peterborough United (3)	2–2	Salford City (4)	Peterborough
15:00 GMT	Jones 47'; Fernandez 90+3'	Report	Mallan 5'; Bilokapic 69' (o.g.)	Stadium: London Road Stadium; Attendance: 4,066; Referee: Sam Purkiss

14 November 2023 Replay	Salford City (4)	4–4 (a.e.t.) (4–5 p)	Peterborough United (3)	Salford
19:45 GMT	Tilt 4', 54'; Knight 61' (o.g.); Mallan 104'	Report	Randall 16'; Mason-Clark 18'; Collins 45+1'; Clarke-Harris 120+3'	Stadium: Moor Lane; Attendance: 1,030; Referee: Darren Drysdale
	Penalties
	Watson (penalty scored); Mallan (penalty scored); Dackers (penalty missed); Garbutt (penalty scored); Watt (penalty missed); Lund (penalty scored); McLennan (penalty missed)		(penalty scored) Clarke-Harris; (penalty scored) Poku; (penalty missed) Mason-Clark; (penalty missed) Wakeling; (penalty scored) Ajiboye; (penalty scored) Dornelly; (penalty scored) Collins

4 November 2023	Eastleigh (5)	5–1	Boreham Wood (5)	Eastleigh
15:00 GMT	Atangana 17'; Maguire 22', 90+4'; Francillette 38', 53'	Report	Robinson 18'	Stadium: Ten Acres; Attendance: 1,727; Referee: Jamie O'Connor

4 November 2023	Bradford City (4)	1–2	Wycombe Wanderers (3)	Bradford
15:00 GMT	Walker 64'	Report	Phillips 18'; Stubbs 35' (o.g.)	Stadium: Valley Parade; Attendance: 3,642; Referee: Declan Bourne

4 November 2023	Shrewsbury Town (3)	3–2	Colchester United (4)	Shrewsbury
15:00 GMT	Udoh 22'; Shipley 56'; Hall 79' (o.g.)	Report	McGeehan 10'; Mitchell 86'	Stadium: New Meadow; Attendance: 3,011; Referee: Scott Jackson

4 November 2023	Bristol Rovers (3)	7–2	Whitby Town (7)	Bristol
15:00 GMT	Marquis 5'; Thomas 18'; Brown 21'; Evans 40'; Beeden 66' (o.g.); Vale 70'; Collins 77'	Report	Mondal 13'; Simpson 59'	Stadium: Memorial Stadium; Attendance: 4,329; Referee: Ruebyn Ricardo

4 November 2023	Lincoln City (3)	1–2	Morecambe (4)	Lincoln
15:00 GMT	Sørensen 14'	Report	Mellon 43'; Bloxham 53'	Stadium: Sincil Bank; Attendance: 4,607; Referee: Martin Coy

4 November 2023	Sutton United (4)	2–1	AFC Fylde (5)	Sutton
15:00 GMT	Smith 62', 67'	Report	Ustabaşı 45+3'	Stadium: Gander Green Lane; Attendance: 1,262; Referee: James Durkin

4 November 2023	Reading (3)	3–2	Milton Keynes Dons (4)	Reading
15:00 GMT	Ehibhatiomhan 3'; Knibbs 64'; Wing 68'	Report	Gilbey 39'; Dean 90+3'	Stadium: Madejski Stadium; Attendance: 4,325; Referee: Thomas Kirk

4 November 2023	Doncaster Rovers (4)	2–2	Accrington Stanley (4)	Doncaster
15:00 GMT	Mellor 8' (o.g.); Biggins 81'	Report	Whalley 74'; Conneely 84'	Stadium: Eco-Power Stadium; Attendance: 3,226; Referee: Alan Young

14 November 2023 Replay	Accrington Stanley (4)	1–2 (a.e.t.)	Doncaster Rovers (4)	Accrington
19:45 GMT	Pritchard 7'	Report	Westbrooke 67'; Ironside 101'	Stadium: Crown Ground; Attendance: 1,136; Referee: Scott Tallis

4 November 2023	Chester (6)	0–0	York City (5)	Chester
15:00 GMT		Report		Stadium: Deva Stadium; Attendance: 3,329; Referee: Dean Watson

14 November 2023 Replay	York City (5)	2–1	Chester (6)	Huntington
19:45 GMT	John-Lewis 5', 66'	Report	Glendon 71'	Stadium: York Community Stadium; Attendance: 3,850; Referee: Aaron Bannister

4 November 2023	Scarborough Athletic (6)	1–1	Forest Green Rovers (4)	Scarborough
15:00 GMT	Wiles 27'	Report	Sully 90+3'	Stadium: Flamingo Land Stadium; Attendance: 3,209; Referee: Marc Edwards

14 November 2023 Replay	Forest Green Rovers (4)*	Void (Note: The match was ordered to be replayed again after Forest Green Rovers were found to have fielded an ineligible player. Forest Green Rovers won the match 5–2 before the score was completely wiped out.)	Scarborough Athletic (6)	Nailsworth
19:45 GMT	Jenks 5'; McAllister 18' (pen.); Robson 30'; Bunker 35'; Omotoye 76'	Report	Wiles 41'; Coulson 89'	Stadium: The New Lawn; Attendance: 1,146; Referee: Paul Howard

12 December 2023 Re-Match	Scarborough Athletic (6)	2–4	Forest Green Rovers (4)	Scarborough
19:45 GMT	Robson 29' (o.g.); Colville 86'	Report	Omotoye 34'; Morton 55'; Robertson 83'; Stevens 89'	Stadium: Flamingo Land Stadium; Attendance: 2,518; Referee: Darren Drysdale

4 November 2023	Notts County (4)	3–2	Crawley Town (4)	Nottingham
15:00 GMT	Crowley 13'; McGoldrick 58'; Langstaff 76'	Report	Orsi 3', 66'	Stadium: Meadow Lane; Attendance: 3,952; Referee: Peter Wright

4 November 2023	Stockport County (4)	5–1	Worksop Town (7)	Stockport
15:00 GMT	Wootton 14', 38', 67', 71'; Bailey 83'	Report	Rollins 22'	Stadium: Edgeley Park; Attendance: 6,443; Referee: Aaron Jackson

4 November 2023	Yeovil Town (6)	3–2	Gateshead (5)	Yeovil
15:00 GMT	Grayson 3' (o.g.); Stevens 26'; Murphy 63'	Report	Dinanga 67' (pen.), 90+5'	Stadium: Huish Park; Attendance: 3,241; Referee: Gary Parsons

4 November 2023	Stevenage (3)	4–3	Tranmere Rovers (4)	Stevenage
15:00 GMT	Roberts 3'; Reid 58' (pen.), 90+10'; Hemmings 81'	Report	L. Norris 28' (pen.); Apter 55'; Morris 90+1'	Stadium: Broadhall Way; Attendance: 2,404; Referee: Neil Hair

4 November 2023	Chesham United (7)	0–2	Maidstone United (6)	Chesham
15:00 GMT		Report	Aransibia 12'; Amantchi 73'	Stadium: The Meadow; Attendance: 2,984; Referee: Wayne Cartmel

4 November 2023	AFC Wimbledon (4)	5–1	Cheltenham Town (3)	Wimbledon
15:00 GMT	Al-Hamadi 23'; Tilley 45+2', 61'; Davison 65'; Lemonheigh-Evans 70'	Report	Street 76'	Stadium: Plough Lane; Attendance: 4,975; Referee: Alan Young

4 November 2023	Cambridge United (3)	2–1	Bracknell Town (7)	Cambridge
15:00 GMT	Okenabirhie 27'; Osu 48' (o.g.)	Report	Harris 88'	Stadium: Abbey Stadium; Attendance: 3,411; Referee: Richie Watkins

4 November 2023	Ramsgate (8)	2–1	Woking (5)	Ramsgate
15:00 GMT	Jadama 40'; Martin 72'	Report	Lewis 13'	Stadium: Southwood Stadium; Attendance: 3,000; Referee: Stephen Parkinson

4 November 2023	Bromley (5)	0–2	Blackpool (3)	Bromley
17:45 GMT		Report	Lavery 5'; Dembélé 28'	Stadium: Hayes Lane; Attendance: 4,455; Referee: David Rock

4 November 2023	Mansfield Town (4)	1–2	Wrexham (4)	Mansfield
19:45 GMT	Oates 60'	Report	Dalby 34'; Mullin 58'	Stadium: Field Mill; Attendance: 6,158; Referee: Edward Duckworth

5 November 2023	Chesterfield (5)	1–0	Portsmouth (3)	Chesterfield
12:15 GMT	Naylor 32'	Report		Stadium: SMH Group Stadium; Attendance: 8,377; Referee: Will Finnie

5 November 2023	Kidderminster Harriers (5)	1–2	Fleetwood Town (3)	Kidderminster
14:00 GMT	Hobson 44'	Report	Earl 45+1'; Rooney 46'	Stadium: Aggborough Stadium; Attendance: 2,496; Referee: Matthew Corlett

5 November 2023	Slough Town (6)	1–1	Grimsby Town (4)	Slough
14:00 GMT	Davies 28'	Report	Rose 75'	Stadium: Arbour Park; Attendance: 2,205; Referee: Ben Atkinson

14 November 2023 Replay	Grimsby Town (4)	7–2	Slough Town (6)	Cleethorpes
19:45 GMT	Pyke 7', 45'; Rose 16'; Gnahoua 65', 85'; Hunt 81'; Andrews 86'	Report	Dyce 20'; Ogbonna 34'	Stadium: Blundell Park; Attendance: 3,079; Referee: Jacob Miles

5 November 2023	Crewe Alexandra (4)	2–2	Derby County (3)	Crewe
14:45 GMT	Baker-Richardson 41'; Nevitt 54'	Report	Mendez-Laing 89'; Hourihane 90+3'	Stadium: Gresty Road; Attendance: 5,201; Referee: Scott Oldham

14 November 2023 Replay	Derby County (3)	1–3	Crewe Alexandra (4)	Derby
19:45 GMT	Barkhuizen 3'	Report	Rowe 7', 21'; Demetriou 65'	Stadium: Pride Park Stadium; Attendance: 6,439; Referee: Christopher Pollard

5 November 2023	Charlton Athletic (3)	1–1	Cray Valley Paper Mills (8)	Charlton
17:30 GMT	Fraser 9'	Report	Ness 48' (o.g.)	Stadium: The Valley; Attendance: 6,721; Referee: Ben Speedie

15 November 2023 Replay	Cray Valley Paper Mills (8)	1–6	Charlton Athletic (3)	Eltham
19:45 GMT	Lisbie 44' (pen.)	Report	May 35', 51'; Leaburn 49'; Dobson 58'; Campbell 77'; Mbick 85'	Stadium: Badgers Sports Ground; Attendance: 1,550; Referee: Charles Breakspear

== Second round ==
The draw for the second round was held live on ITV1 and STV on 5 November 2023 following the conclusion of the televised first-round game between Chesterfield and Portsmouth. The draw was made by Dave Beasant and Anita Asante, and consisted of the 40 winners from the previous round. The round included Ramsgate from the eighth tier, the lowest ranked team remaining in the competition.

Number of teams per tier still in competition
Premier League (Note: Premier League and Championship teams joined the competition in the third round.)	EFL Championship	EFL League One	EFL League Two	Non-League	Total
20 / 20	24 / 24	15 / 24	15 / 24	10 / 32	84 / 124

1 December 2023	Notts County (4)	2–3	Shrewsbury Town (3)	Nottingham
19:45 GMT	Brindley 38'; Sanderson 75'	Report	Bowman 1', 49', 56'	Stadium: Meadow Lane; Attendance: 4,551; Referee: Martin Woods

1 December 2023	York City (5)	0–1	Wigan Athletic (3)	Huntington
19:45 GMT		Report	Humphrys 61'	Stadium: York Community Stadium; Attendance: 6,613; Referee: Thomas Kirk

2 December 2023	Maidstone United (6)	2–1	Barrow (4)	Maidstone
15:00 GMT	Corne 35'; Gurung 74'	Report	Whitfield 20'	Stadium: Gallagher Stadium; Attendance: 2,903; Referee: David Rock

2 December 2023	Wycombe Wanderers (3)	0–2	Morecambe (4)	High Wycombe
15:00 GMT		Report	King 38'; Bloxham 56'	Stadium: Adams Park; Attendance: 1,604; Referee: Peter Wright

2 December 2023	Cambridge United (3)	4–0	Fleetwood Town (3)	Cambridge
15:00 GMT	Andrew 7'; Kachunga 11'; Okenabirhie 13'; Ahadme 83'	Report		Stadium: Abbey Stadium; Attendance: 3,387; Referee: Seb Stockbridge

2 December 2023	Bolton Wanderers (3)	5–1	Harrogate Town (4)	Horwich
15:00 GMT	Böðvarsson 9', 33', 43'; Nlundulu 49', 52'	Report	Thomson 45'	Stadium: Toughsheet Community Stadium; Attendance: 5,703; Referee: Tony Harrington

2 December 2023	Peterborough United (3)	2–1	Doncaster Rovers (4)	Peterborough
15:00 GMT	Burrows 3'; Mason-Clark 53'	Report	Faal 75'	Stadium: London Road Stadium; Attendance: 5,495; Referee: Ben Speedie

2 December 2023	Gillingham (4)	2–0	Charlton Athletic (3)	Gillingham
15:00 GMT	Bonne 26'; Dieng 30'	Report		Stadium: Priestfield Stadium; Attendance: 7,717; Referee: Sunny Sukhvir Gill

2 December 2023	Stevenage (3)	1–1	Port Vale (3)	Stevenage
15:00 GMT	Reid 69'	Report	Ojo 76' (pen.)	Stadium: Broadhall Way; Attendance: 2,491; Referee: Tom Reeves

12 December 2023 Replay	Port Vale (3)	3–3 (a.e.t.) (3–4 p)	Stevenage (3)	Stoke-on-Trent
19:45 GMT	Garrity 6', 55'; Loft 114'	Report	White 81'; Hemmings 90+6'; N. Thompson 119'	Stadium: Vale Park; Attendance: 2,073; Referee: Tom Nield
	Penalties
	Ojo (penalty scored); Garrity (penalty missed); Lowe (penalty scored); Sang (penalty scored); Loft (penalty missed)		(penalty scored) Reid; (penalty scored) Hemmings; (penalty scored) White; (penalty scored) N. Thompson; (penalty missed) James-Wildin

2 December 2023	Newport County (4)	1–1	Barnet (5)	Newport
15:00 GMT	McLoughlin 44'	Report	Collinge 89'	Stadium: Rodney Parade; Attendance: 2,707; Referee: Jacob Miles

12 December 2023 Replay	Barnet (5)	1–4	Newport County (4)	Canons Park
19:45 GMT	Pritchard 37'	Report	Payne 6'; Bogle 12'; Collinge 25' (o.g.); Palmer-Houlden 76'	Stadium: The Hive Stadium; Attendance: 1,451; Referee: Craig Hicks

2 December 2023	Oxford United (3)	2–0	Grimsby Town (4)	Oxford
15:00 GMT	McGuane 11'; Bodin 75'	Report		Stadium: Kassam Stadium; Attendance: 4,149; Referee: Darren Bond

2 December 2023	Sutton United (4)	3–0	Horsham (Note: Sutton were originally drawn to play Barnsley, but Barnsley were disqualified for fielding an ineligible player against Horsham in the first round. Horsham were then given a famous giant-killing by default.) (7)	Sutton
15:00 GMT	Pereira 64', 74'; Patrick 89'	Report		Stadium: Gander Green Lane; Attendance: 4,283; Referee: Scott Tallis

3 December 2023	Eastleigh (5)	2–1	Reading (3)	Eastleigh
13:30 GMT	McCallum 22', 90+4'	Report	Azeez 86'	Stadium: Ten Acres; Attendance: 5,002; Referee: Lewis Smith

3 December 2023	Chesterfield (5)	1–0	Leyton Orient (3)	Chesterfield
14:00 GMT	El Mizouni 40' (o.g.)	Report		Stadium: SMH Group Stadium; Attendance: 8,232; Referee: Scott Oldham

3 December 2023	Aldershot Town (5)	2–2	Stockport County (4)	Aldershot
14:00 GMT	Stokes 10', 67'	Report	Byrne 13'; Madden 46'	Stadium: Recreation Ground; Attendance: 4,756; Referee: Paul Howard

13 December 2023 Replay	Stockport County (4)	0–1	Aldershot Town (5)	Stockport
19:45 GMT		Report	Scott 88'	Stadium: Edgeley Park; Attendance: 2,855; Referee: Ben Speedie

3 December 2023	Wrexham (4)	3–0	Yeovil Town (6)	Wrexham
15:45 GMT	Palmer 14'; Cannon 45+2'; Dalby 90+3'	Report		Stadium: Racecourse Ground; Attendance: 9,604; Referee: Lee Swabey

4 December 2023	AFC Wimbledon (4)	5–0	Ramsgate (8)	Wimbledon
19:45 GMT	Reeves 8'; Al-Hamadi 26', 53'; Neufville 43'; Lemonheigh-Evans 48'	Report		Stadium: Plough Lane; Attendance: 6,894; Referee: Christopher Pollard

5 December 2023	Alfreton Town (6)	0–0	Walsall (4)	Alfreton
19:45 GMT		Report		Stadium: North Street; Attendance: 2,510; Referee: Sam Allison

12 December 2023 Replay	Walsall (4)	1–0	Alfreton Town (6)	Walsall
19:45 GMT	Matt 6'	Report		Stadium: Bescot Stadium; Attendance: 2,112; Referee: Simon Mather

12 December 2023	Crewe Alexandra (4)	2–4	Bristol Rovers (3)	Crewe
19:45 GMT	Nevitt 65'; Rowe 73'	Report	Marquis 18'; Wilson 25'; Evans 42'; Cooney 49' (o.g.)	Stadium: Gresty Road; Attendance: 3,127; Referee: Declan Bourne

19 December 2023	Blackpool (3)	3–0	Forest Green Rovers (4)	Blackpool
19:45 GMT	Dale 18'; Lawrence-Gabriel 75'; Ekpiteta 84'	Report		Stadium: Bloomfield Road; Attendance: 3,188; Referee: Scott Jackson

== Third round ==
The third round saw the 20 winners from the second round joined by the 44 clubs from the Premier League and the Championship. The draw was made on 3 December 2023 by Trevor Steven and Jen Beattie during pre-game for the Eastleigh v Reading second round tie on ITV1 and STV. The round included Maidstone United from the sixth tier, the lowest-ranked team remaining in the competition.

Number of teams per tier still in competition
Premier League	EFL Championship	EFL League One	EFL League Two	Non-League	Total
20 / 20	24 / 24	9 / 24	7 / 24	4 / 32	64 / 124

4 January 2024	Crystal Palace (1)	0–0	Everton (1)	Selhurst
20:00 GMT		Report		Stadium: Selhurst Park; Attendance: 24,489; Referee: Chris Kavanagh

17 January 2024 Replay	Everton (1)	1–0	Crystal Palace (1)	Liverpool
19:45 GMT	Gomes 42'	Report		Stadium: Goodison Park; Attendance: 37,796; Referee: Tony Harrington

5 January 2024	Brentford (1)	1–1	Wolverhampton Wanderers (1)	Brentford
19:15 GMT	Maupay 41'	Report	Doyle 64'	Stadium: Brentford Community Stadium; Attendance: 16,818; Referee: Tony Harrington

16 January 2024 Replay	Wolverhampton Wanderers (1)	3–2 (a.e.t.)	Brentford (1)	Wolverhampton
19:30 GMT	Semedo 36'; Fraser 72'; Cunha 105+5' (pen.)	Report	Collins 13'; Maupay 52'	Stadium: Molineux Stadium; Attendance: 24,692; Referee: Andrew Madley

5 January 2024	Fulham (1)	1–0	Rotherham United (2)	Fulham
19:30 GMT	Decordova-Reid 24'	Report		Stadium: Craven Cottage; Attendance: 15,083; Referee: Simon Hooper

5 January 2024	Tottenham Hotspur (1)	1–0	Burnley (1)	Tottenham
20:00 GMT	Porro 79'	Report		Stadium: Tottenham Hotspur Stadium; Attendance: 60,982; Referee: Sam Barrott

6 January 2024	AFC Wimbledon (4)	1–3	Ipswich Town (2)	Wimbledon
12:30 GMT	Reeves 17' (pen.)	Report	Davison 8' (o.g.); Tuanzebe 40'; Taylor 90'	Stadium: Plough Lane; Attendance: 8,595; Referee: Matthew Donohue

6 January 2024	Millwall (2)	2–3	Leicester City (2)	Bermondsey
12:30 GMT	Watmore 56'; Flemming 86'	Report	Casadei 16'; Pereira 39'; Cannon 61'	Stadium: The Den; Attendance: 10,092; Referee: Oliver Langford

6 January 2024	Coventry City (2)	6–2	Oxford United (3)	Coventry
12:30 GMT	Latibeaudiere 8'; Sheaf 11'; Palmer 17'; O'Hare 50' (pen.); Godden 84', 88'	Report	Harris 10'; Goodrham 79'	Stadium: Coventry Building Society Arena; Attendance: 18,211; Referee: Josh Smith

6 January 2024	Maidstone United (6)	1–0	Stevenage (3)	Maidstone
12:30 GMT	Corne 45+2' (pen.)	Report		Stadium: Gallagher Stadium; Attendance: 4,024; Referee: Stephen Martin

6 January 2024	Sunderland (2)	0–3	Newcastle United (1)	Sunderland
12:45 GMT		Report	Ballard 35' (o.g.); Isak 46', 90' (pen.)	Stadium: Stadium of Light; Attendance: 44,814; Referee: Craig Pawson

6 January 2024	Stoke City (2)	2–4	Brighton & Hove Albion (1)	Stoke-on-Trent
15:00 GMT	Van Hecke 16' (o.g.); Baker 63' (pen.)	Report	Estupiñán 45+6'; Dunk 52'; João Pedro 71', 80'	Stadium: Bet365 Stadium; Attendance: 17,032; Referee: Paul Tierney

6 January 2024	Norwich City (2)	1–1	Bristol Rovers (3)	Norwich
15:00 GMT	Barnes 12'	Report	Ward 17'	Stadium: Carrow Road; Attendance: 19,848; Referee: Lewis Smith

17 January 2024 Replay	Bristol Rovers (3)	1–3	Norwich City (2)	Bristol
19:45 GMT	McCormick 20'	Report	Sara 53'; Idah 59' (pen.); McLean 87'	Stadium: Memorial Stadium; Attendance: 10,335; Referee: Andy Davies

6 January 2024	Southampton (2)	4–0	Walsall (4)	Southampton
15:00 GMT	Fraser 6', 68'; Mara 58'; Adams 78'	Report		Stadium: St Mary's Stadium; Attendance: 22,627; Referee: David Webb

6 January 2024	Watford (2)	2–1	Chesterfield (5)	Watford
15:00 GMT	Rajović 76'; Dele-Bashiru 90+5'	Report	Quigley 28'	Stadium: Vicarage Road; Attendance: 15,932; Referee: Gavin Ward

6 January 2024	Blackburn Rovers (2)	5–2	Cambridge United (3)	Blackburn
15:00 GMT	Szmodics 23', 37', 45+3'; Sigurðsson 66'; Leonard 81'	Report	Lankester 6'; Kaikai 26'	Stadium: Ewood Park; Attendance: 8,311; Referee: Geoff Eltringham

6 January 2024	Gillingham (4)	0–4	Sheffield United (1)	Gillingham
15:00 GMT		Report	Osula 14', 39'; McAtee 83', 87'	Stadium: Priestfield Stadium; Attendance: 8,809; Referee: Darren Bond

6 January 2024	Queens Park Rangers (2)	2–3	Bournemouth (1)	Shepherd's Bush
15:00 GMT	Armstrong 40'; Dykes 42'	Report	Tavernier 48'; Moore 58'; Kluivert 69'	Stadium: Loftus Road; Attendance: 10,725; Referee: Rebecca Welch

6 January 2024	Plymouth Argyle (2)	3–1	Sutton United (4)	Plymouth
15:00 GMT	Cundle 18'; Hardie 68' (pen.); Whittaker 90+1'	Report	Angol 50'	Stadium: Home Park; Attendance: 15,643; Referee: Will Finnie

6 January 2024	Newport County (4)	1–1	Eastleigh (5)	Newport
15:00 GMT	Clarke 56'	Report	Maguire 82' (pen.)	Stadium: Rodney Parade; Attendance: 4,966; Referee: Edward Duckworth

16 January 2024 Replay	Eastleigh (5)	1–3	Newport County (4)	Eastleigh
19:45 GMT	McCallum 48'	Report	Wildig 3'; Clarke 60'; W. Evans 79'	Stadium: Ten Acres; Attendance: 5,075; Referee: Sam Allison

6 January 2024	Hull City (2)	1–1	Birmingham City (2)	Kingston upon Hull
15:00 GMT	Jacob 87'	Report	Jutkiewicz 18'	Stadium: MKM Stadium; Attendance: 12,200; Referee: Darren England

16 January 2024 Replay	Birmingham City (2)	2–1	Hull City (2)	Birmingham
19:45 GMT	Stansfield 66'; Miyoshi 90+3'	Report	Lokilo 12'	Stadium: St Andrew's; Attendance: 7,133; Referee: Lewis Smith

6 January 2024	Middlesbrough (2)	0–1	Aston Villa (1)	Middlesbrough
17:30 GMT		Report	Cash 87'	Stadium: Riverside Stadium; Attendance: 25,022; Referee: Robert Jones

6 January 2024	Sheffield Wednesday (2)	4–0	Cardiff City (2)	Sheffield
17:30 GMT	Windass 2'; Sawyers 38' (o.g.); Palmer 40'; Wilks 90+1'	Report		Stadium: Hillsborough Stadium; Attendance: 10,955; Referee: Thomas Kirk

6 January 2024	Swansea City (2)	2–0	Morecambe (4)	Swansea
17:30 GMT	Patino 47'; Yates 87'	Report		Stadium: Swansea.com Stadium; Attendance: 7,670; Referee: Tom Nield

6 January 2024	Chelsea (1)	4–0	Preston North End (2)	Fulham
17:30 GMT	Broja 58'; Thiago Silva 66'; Sterling 69'; Fernández 85'	Report		Stadium: Stamford Bridge; Attendance: 39,705; Referee: Thomas Bramall

7 January 2024	Luton Town (1)	0–0	Bolton Wanderers (3)	Luton
14:00 GMT		Report		Stadium: Kenilworth Road; Attendance: 10,739; Referee: Andrew Madley

16 January 2024 Replay	Bolton Wanderers (3)	1–2	Luton Town (1)	Horwich
19:45 GMT	Charles 11'	Report	Chong 15'; Ogbene 57'	Stadium: Toughsheet Community Stadium; Attendance: 10,878; Referee: Thomas Bramall

7 January 2024	Shrewsbury Town (3)	0–1	Wrexham (4)	Shrewsbury
14:00 GMT		Report	O'Connor 72'	Stadium: New Meadow; Attendance: 9,304; Referee: Andrew Kitchen

7 January 2024	West Ham United (1)	1–1	Bristol City (2)	Stratford
14:00 GMT	Bowen 4'	Report	Conway 61'	Stadium: London Stadium; Attendance: 62,477; Referee: Graham Scott

16 January 2024 Replay	Bristol City (2)	1–0	West Ham United (1)	Bristol
19:45 GMT	Conway 3'	Report		Stadium: Ashton Gate; Attendance: 25,616; Referee: Darren England

7 January 2024	West Bromwich Albion (2)	4–1	Aldershot Town (5)	West Bromwich
14:00 GMT	Chalobah 7'; Malcolm 15'; Dike 27'; Fellows 88'	Report	Bray 90+5'	Stadium: The Hawthorns; Attendance: 16,345; Referee: Anthony Backhouse

7 January 2024	Peterborough United (3)	0–3	Leeds United (2)	Peterborough
14:00 GMT		Report	Ampadu 34', 90'; Bamford 47'	Stadium: London Road Stadium; Attendance: 12,927; Referee: Sam Allison

7 January 2024	Nottingham Forest (1)	2–2	Blackpool (3)	West Bridgford
14:00 GMT	Domínguez 39'; Gibbs-White 56'	Report	Lawrence-Gabriel 25'; Morgan 27'	Stadium: City Ground; Attendance: 27,909; Referee: Sunny Sukhvir Gill

17 January 2024 Replay	Blackpool (3)	2–3 (a.e.t.)	Nottingham Forest (1)	Blackpool
19:45 GMT	Morgan 61'; Joseph 78'	Report	Omobamidele 16'; Danilo 46'; Wood 110'	Stadium: Bloomfield Road; Attendance: 8,098; Referee: Darren Bond

7 January 2024	Manchester City (1)	5–0	Huddersfield Town (2)	Manchester
14:00 GMT	Foden 33', 65'; Álvarez 37'; Jackson 58' (o.g.); Doku 74'	Report		Stadium: City of Manchester Stadium; Attendance: 51,939; Referee: Michael Salisbury

7 January 2024	Arsenal (1)	0–2	Liverpool (1)	Holloway
16:30 GMT		Report	Kiwior 80' (o.g.); Díaz 90+5'	Stadium: Emirates Stadium; Attendance: 58,538; Referee: John Brooks

8 January 2024	Wigan Athletic (3)	0–2	Manchester United (1)	Wigan
20:15 GMT		Report	Dalot 22'; Fernandes 74' (pen.)	Stadium: DW Stadium; Attendance: 22,870; Referee: Anthony Taylor

== Fourth round ==
The draw was made on 8 January 2024 by Gary Mabbutt and Emma Byrne in the build-up to the Wigan Athletic v Manchester United third round tie on ITV1 and STV. The round included Maidstone United from the sixth tier, the lowest-ranked team remaining in the competition. The five replays that were contested in this round were the final replays to ever be played in the competition proper.

Number of teams per tier still in competition
Premier League	EFL Championship	EFL League One	EFL League Two	Non-League	Total
15 / 20	14 / 24	0 / 24	2 / 24	1 / 32	32 / 124

25 January 2024	Bournemouth (1)	5–0	Swansea City (2)	Bournemouth
19:45 GMT	Kelly 7'; Scott 10'; Sinisterra 14'; Brooks 35'; Solanke 44'	Report		Stadium: Dean Court; Attendance: 10,166; Referee: Darren England

26 January 2024	Bristol City (2)	0–0	Nottingham Forest (1)	Bristol
19:45 GMT		Report		Stadium: Ashton Gate; Attendance: 25,787; Referee: Stuart Attwell

7 February 2024 Replay	Nottingham Forest (1)	1–1 (a.e.t.) (5–3 p)	Bristol City (2)	West Bridgford
19:45 GMT	Origi 8'	Report	Knight 14'	Stadium: City Ground; Attendance: 27,754; Referee: Michael Salisbury
	Penalties
	Gibbs-White (penalty scored); Hudson-Odoi (penalty scored); Williams (penalty scored); Niakhaté (penalty scored); Awoniyi (penalty scored)		(penalty scored) Cornick; (penalty missed) Bell; (penalty scored) Wells; (penalty scored) Mehmeti

26 January 2024	Sheffield Wednesday (2)	1–1	Coventry City (2)	Sheffield
19:45 GMT	Gassama 84'	Report	Torp 45'	Stadium: Hillsborough Stadium; Attendance: 14,215; Referee: Darren Bond

6 February 2024 Replay	Coventry City (2)	4–1	Sheffield Wednesday (2)	Coventry
19:45 GMT	Palmer 3'; O'Hare 50', 56'; Wright 58'	Report	Cadamarteri 10'	Stadium: Coventry Building Society Arena; Attendance: 19,359; Referee: Chris Kavanagh

26 January 2024	Chelsea (1)	0–0	Aston Villa (1)	Fulham
19:45 GMT		Report		Stadium: Stamford Bridge; Attendance: 39,325; Referee: Robert Jones

7 February 2024 Replay	Aston Villa (1)	1–3	Chelsea (1)	Birmingham
20:00 GMT	Diaby 90+1'	Report	Gallagher 11'; Jackson 21'; Fernández 54'	Stadium: Villa Park; Attendance: 40,013; Referee: Thomas Bramall

26 January 2024	Tottenham Hotspur (1)	0–1	Manchester City (1)	Tottenham
20:00 GMT		Report	Aké 88'	Stadium: Tottenham Hotspur Stadium; Attendance: 60,872; Referee: Paul Tierney

27 January 2024	Ipswich Town (2)	1–2	Maidstone United (6)	Ipswich
12:30 GMT	Sarmiento 56'	Report	Reynolds 43'; Corne 66'	Stadium: Portman Road; Attendance: 27,273; Referee: Anthony Taylor

27 January 2024	Leicester City (2)	3–0	Birmingham City (2)	Leicester
15:00 GMT	Vardy 47'; Akgün 72'; Praet 88'	Report		Stadium: King Power Stadium; Attendance: 28,396; Referee: Craig Pawson

27 January 2024	Leeds United (2)	1–1	Plymouth Argyle (2)	Leeds
15:00 GMT	Anthony 31'	Report	Randell 73'	Stadium: Elland Road; Attendance: 35,247; Referee: Lewis Smith

6 February 2024 Replay	Plymouth Argyle (2)	1–4 (a.e.t.)	Leeds United (2)	Plymouth
19:45 GMT	Galloway 78'	Report	Gnonto 66'; Summerville 97'; Rutter 111'; Hardie 117' (o.g.)	Stadium: Home Park; Attendance: 16,636; Referee: Robert Jones

27 January 2024	Everton (1)	1–2	Luton Town (1)	Liverpool
15:00 GMT	Harrison 55'	Report	Mykolenko 39' (o.g.); Woodrow 90+6'	Stadium: Goodison Park; Attendance: 37,713; Referee: Simon Hooper

27 January 2024	Sheffield United (1)	2–5	Brighton & Hove Albion (1)	Sheffield
15:00 GMT	Hamer 44'; Osula 45+8'	Report	Buonanotte 14'; João Pedro 29' (pen.), 52' (pen.), 67'; Welbeck 90+7'	Stadium: Bramall Lane; Attendance: 18,391; Referee: Sunny Singh Gill

27 January 2024	Fulham (1)	0–2	Newcastle United (1)	Fulham
19:00 GMT		Report	Longstaff 39'; Burn 61'	Stadium: Craven Cottage; Attendance: 18,960; Referee: Jarred Gillett

28 January 2024	West Bromwich Albion (2)	0–2	Wolverhampton Wanderers (1)	West Bromwich
11:45 GMT		Report	Neto 38'; Cunha 78'	Stadium: The Hawthorns; Attendance: 25,013; Referee: Thomas Bramall

28 January 2024	Watford (2)	1–1	Southampton (2)	Watford
14:00 GMT	Martins 5'	Report	S. Armstrong 89'	Stadium: Vicarage Road; Attendance: 16,688; Referee: Michael Salisbury

6 February 2024 Replay	Southampton (2)	3–0	Watford (2)	Southampton
19:45 GMT	Mara 52', 58'; Adams 76'	Report		Stadium: St Mary's Stadium; Attendance: 17,844; Referee: Darren Bond

28 January 2024	Liverpool (1)	5–2	Norwich City (2)	Liverpool
14:30 GMT	Jones 16'; Núñez 28'; Jota 53'; Van Dijk 63'; Gravenberch 90+5'	Report	Gibson 22'; Sainz 69'	Stadium: Anfield; Attendance: 57,334; Referee: Sam Barrott

28 January 2024	Newport County (4)	2–4	Manchester United (1)	Newport
16:30 GMT	Morris 36'; W. Evans 47'	Report	Fernandes 7'; Mainoo 13'; Antony 68'; Højlund 90+4'	Stadium: Rodney Parade; Attendance: 9,086; Referee: David Coote

29 January 2024	Blackburn Rovers (2)	4–1	Wrexham (4)	Blackburn
19:30 GMT	Szmodics 32', 45+1'; Gallagher 34'; Tronstad 59'	Report	Cannon 19'	Stadium: Ewood Park; Attendance: 18,169; Referee: Andrew Madley

== Fifth round ==
The draw was made on 28 January 2024 by Glen Johnson at half-time during the Liverpool v Norwich City fourth round tie on ITV1 and STV. The round included Maidstone United from the sixth tier, the lowest-ranked team remaining in the competition, and the first side outside of the top five divisions to reach the last 16 since Blyth Spartans in 1977–78.

Number of teams per tier still in competition
Premier League	EFL Championship	EFL League One	EFL League Two	Non-League	Total
10 / 20	5 / 24	0 / 24	0 / 24	1 / 32	16 / 124

26 February 2024	Coventry City (2)	5–0	Maidstone United (6)	Coventry
19:45 GMT	Simms 9', 14', 35'; Tavares 88', 90+1'	Report		Stadium: Coventry Building Society Arena; Attendance: 26,857; Referee: Michael Salisbury

27 February 2024	Bournemouth (1)	0–1 (a.e.t.)	Leicester City (2)	Bournemouth
19:30 GMT		Report	Fatawu 105'	Stadium: Dean Court; Attendance: 10,872; Referee: Paul Tierney

27 February 2024	Blackburn Rovers (2)	1–1 (a.e.t.) (3–4 p)	Newcastle United (1)	Blackburn
19:45 GMT	Szmodics 79'	Report	Gordon 71'	Stadium: Ewood Park; Attendance: 22,730; Referee: Jarred Gillett
	Penalties
	Szmodics (penalty missed); Brittain (penalty scored); Sigurðsson (penalty scored); Ayari (penalty scored); Hyam (penalty missed)		(penalty scored) Schär; (penalty missed) Barnes; (penalty scored) Bruno Guimarães; (penalty scored) Anderson; (penalty scored) Gordon

27 February 2024	Luton Town (1)	2–6	Manchester City (1)	Luton
20:00 GMT	Clark 45', 52'	Report	Haaland 3', 18', 40', 55', 58'; Kovačić 72'	Stadium: Kenilworth Road; Attendance: 11,163; Referee: Anthony Taylor

28 February 2024	Chelsea (1)	3–2	Leeds United (2)	Fulham
19:30 GMT	Jackson 15'; Mudryk 37'; Gallagher 90'	Report	Joseph 8', 59'	Stadium: Stamford Bridge; Attendance: 37,892; Referee: David Coote

28 February 2024	Nottingham Forest (1)	0–1	Manchester United (1)	West Bridgford
19:45 GMT		Report	Casemiro 89'	Stadium: City Ground; Attendance: 28,665; Referee: Chris Kavanagh

28 February 2024	Wolverhampton Wanderers (1)	1–0	Brighton & Hove Albion (1)	Wolverhampton
19:45 GMT	M. Lemina 2'	Report		Stadium: Molineux Stadium; Attendance: 23,822; Referee: Andrew Madley

28 February 2024	Liverpool (1)	3–0	Southampton (2)	Liverpool
20:00 GMT	Koumas 44'; Danns 73', 88'	Report		Stadium: Anfield; Attendance: 59,782; Referee: Craig Pawson

== Quarter-finals ==
The draw for the quarter-finals was made on 28 February 2024 by Seema Jaswal and David Seaman on ITV4 as part of the build-up to the fifth round tie between Chelsea and Leeds United. The round included Championship sides Coventry City and Leicester City, the lowest-ranked teams left in the competition.

Number of teams per tier still in competition
Premier League	EFL Championship	EFL League One	EFL League Two	Non-League	Total
6 / 20	2 / 24	0 / 24	0 / 24	0 / 32	8 / 124

16 March 2024	Wolverhampton Wanderers (1)	2–3	Coventry City (2)	Wolverhampton
12:15 GMT	Aït-Nouri 83'; H. Bueno 88'	Report	Simms 53', 90+7'; Wright 90+10'	Stadium: Molineux Stadium; Attendance: 31,262; Referee: Sam Barrott

16 March 2024	Manchester City (1)	2–0	Newcastle United (1)	Manchester
17:30 GMT	Silva 13', 31'	Report		Stadium: City of Manchester Stadium; Attendance: 52,126; Referee: Simon Hooper

17 March 2024	Chelsea (1)	4–2	Leicester City (2)	Fulham
12:45 GMT	Cucurella 13'; Palmer 45+1'; Chukwuemeka 90+2'; Madueke 90+8'	Report	Disasi 51' (o.g.); Mavididi 62'	Stadium: Stamford Bridge; Attendance: 39,589; Referee: Andrew Madley

17 March 2024	Manchester United (1)	4–3 (a.e.t.)	Liverpool (1)	Trafford
15:30 GMT	McTominay 10'; Antony 87'; Rashford 112'; Amad 120+1'	Report	Mac Allister 44'; Salah 45+2'; Elliott 105'	Stadium: Old Trafford; Attendance: 72,291; Referee: John Brooks

== Semi-finals ==
The draw for the semi-finals was made on 17 March 2024 by Ian Wright on ITV1, following the quarter-final match between Manchester United and Liverpool. The round included Championship club Coventry City, the only remaining non-top flight team in the competition.

Manchester United extended their English record of a 32nd overall FA Cup semi-final appearance and their second consecutive season, after advancing past Brighton & Hove Albion on penalties last season. Manchester City made a sixth consecutive FA Cup semi-final appearance, also an English record; the club had won two and lost three of the previous five encounters.

Number of teams per tier still in competition
Premier League	EFL Championship	EFL League One	EFL League Two	Non-League	Total
3 / 20	1 / 24	0 / 24	0 / 24	0 / 32	4 / 124

20 April 2024	Manchester City (1)	1–0	Chelsea (1)	Wembley
17:15 BST	Silva 84'	Report		Stadium: Wembley Stadium; Attendance: 80,902; Referee: Michael Oliver

21 April 2024	Coventry City (2)	3–3 (a.e.t.) (2–4 p)	Manchester United (1)	Wembley
15:30 BST	Simms 71'; O'Hare 79'; Wright 90+5' (pen.)	Report	McTominay 23'; Maguire 45+1'; Fernandes 58'	Stadium: Wembley Stadium; Attendance: 83,672; Referee: Robert Jones
	Penalties
	Wright (penalty scored); Torp (penalty scored); O'Hare (penalty missed); Sheaf (penalty missed)		(penalty missed) Casemiro; (penalty scored) Dalot; (penalty scored) Fernandes; (penalty scored) Eriksen; (penalty scored) Højlund

== Final ==
25 May 2024
15:00 BST

Manchester City	1–2	Manchester United
Doku 87'	Report	Garnacho 30'; Mainoo 39'

Wembley Stadium, London
Attendance: 84,814
Referee: Andrew Madley (West Yorkshire)

== Top goalscorers ==
Following the conclusion of the competition, Biggleswade Town player Jonathan ‘JJ’ Lacey was awarded the FA Cup Golden Ball Award, commemorating him as the top scorer of the season from the extra preliminary round through to the final with 10 goals.

Rank	Player	Club	Goals
1	(England) Ellis Simms	Coventry City	6
1	(Republic of Ireland) Sammie Szmodics	Blackburn Rovers	6
3	(Norway) Erling Haaland	Manchester City	5
3	(Brazil) João Pedro	Brighton & Hove Albion	5
5	(England) Callum O'Hare	Coventry City	4
5	(England) Kyle Wootton	Stockport County	4
7	(Iraq) Ali Al-Hamadi	AFC Wimbledon	3
7	(England) Jack Barham	Aldershot Town	3
7	(Wales) Billy Bodin	Oxford United	3
7	(Iceland) Jón Daði Böðvarsson	Bolton Wanderers	3
7	(England) Ryan Bowman	Shrewsbury Town	3
7	(England) Sam Corne	Maidstone United	3
7	(Portugal) Bruno Fernandes	Manchester United	3
7	(Scotland) Chris Maguire	Eastleigh	3
7	(France) Sékou Mara	Southampton	3
7	(England) Paul McCallum	Eastleigh	3
7	(Republic of Ireland) Shane McLoughlin	Newport County	3
7	(Denmark) William Osula	Sheffield United	3
7	(Northern Ireland) Jamie Reid	Stevenage	3
7	(England) Aaron Rowe	Crewe Alexandra	3
7	(Portugal) Bernardo Silva	Manchester City	3
7	(England) Josh Stokes	Aldershot Town	3
7	(United States) Haji Wright	Coventry City	3

== Television rights ==
Both BBC Sport and ITV Sport air FA Cup matches until the 2025–26 season.

Broadcaster	Summary
BBC Sport	18 live matches per season, with highlights of the FA Community Shield. BBC Sport has second and third picks of matches in the second round, fourth round and the quarter-finals, as well as first and fourth pick of matches in the first, third and fifth rounds, and first pick of the semi-finals.
ITV Sport	At least 20 live matches per season, plus live coverage of the FA Community Shield. ITV has first pick and fourth pick of matches in the second round, fourth round and the quarter-finals, as well as second and third picks for the first, third and fifth rounds and second pick of the semi-finals.

Round	Date	Teams	Kick-off	Channels	
Round	Date	Teams	Kick-off	Digital	TV
First round	3 November	Sheppey United v Walsall	19:45	ITVX	ITV4
First round	4 November	Bromley v Blackpool	17:45	BBC iPlayer	BBC Two
First round	4 November	Mansfield Town v Wrexham	19:45	S4C Clic	S4C
First round	5 November	Chesterfield v Portsmouth	12:15	ITVX	ITV1; UTV
First round	5 November	Chesterfield v Portsmouth	12:15	STV Player	STV
First round	5 November	Crewe Alexandra v Derby County	14:45	ITVX	—N/a
First round	5 November	Charlton Athletic v Cray Valley Paper Mills	17:30	BBC iPlayer	BBC Two
First round (Replay)	14 November	Horsham v Barnsley	19:30	ITVX	ITV4
First round (Replay)	15 November	Cray Valley Paper Mills v Charlton Athletic	19:45	BBC iPlayer	BBC Two
Second round	1 December	York City v Wigan Athletic	19:45	BBC iPlayer	BBC Two
Second round	3 December	Eastleigh v Reading	13:30	ITVX	ITV1; UTV
Second round	3 December	Eastleigh v Reading	13:30	STV Player	STV
Second round	3 December	Wrexham v Yeovil Town	15:45	ITVX	—N/a
Second round	4 December	AFC Wimbledon v Ramsgate	19:45	ITVX	ITV4
Second round	5 December	Alfreton Town v Walsall	19:45	BBC iPlayer	—N/a
Second round (Replay)	12 December	Barnet v Newport County	19:45	ITVX	ITV4
Second round (Replay)	13 December	Stockport County v Aldershot Town	19:45	BBC iPlayer	BBC Two
Third round	4 January	Crystal Palace v Everton	20:00	ITVX	ITV4
Third round	5 January	Tottenham Hotspur v Burnley	20:00	ITVX	ITV1
Third round	5 January	Tottenham Hotspur v Burnley	20:00	STV Player	STV
Third round	6 January	Sunderland v Newcastle United	12:45	ITVX	ITV1
Third round	6 January	Sunderland v Newcastle United	12:45	STV Player	STV
Third round	6 January	Chelsea v Preston North End	17:30	BBC iPlayer	—N/a
Third round	6 January	Middlesbrough v Aston Villa	17:30	BBC iPlayer	BBC One
Third round	7 January	Manchester City v Huddersfield Town	14:00	BBC iPlayer	—N/a
Third round	7 January	Shrewsbury Town v Wrexham	14:00	S4C Clic	S4C
Third round	7 January	Arsenal v Liverpool	16:30	BBC iPlayer	BBC One
Third round	8 January	Wigan Athletic v Manchester United	20:15	ITVX	ITV1
Third round	8 January	Wigan Athletic v Manchester United	20:15	STV Player	STV
Third round (Replay)	16 January	Bristol City v West Ham United	19:45	BBC iPlayer	BBC One
Third round (Replay)	17 January	Blackpool v Nottingham Forest	19:45	ITVX	ITV4
Fourth round	25 January	Bournemouth v Swansea City	19:45	S4C Clic	S4C
Fourth round	26 January	Tottenham Hotspur v Manchester City	20:00	ITVX	ITV1; UTV
Fourth round	26 January	Tottenham Hotspur v Manchester City	20:00	STV Player	STV
Fourth round	27 January	Ipswich Town v Maidstone United	12:30	BBC iPlayer	BBC One
Fourth round	27 January	Fulham v Newcastle United	19:00	ITVX	ITV4
Fourth round	28 January	West Bromwich Albion v Wolverhampton Wanderers	11:45	ITVX	ITV1; UTV
Fourth round	28 January	West Bromwich Albion v Wolverhampton Wanderers	11:45	STV Player	STV
Fourth round	28 January	Liverpool v Norwich City	14:30	ITVX	ITV1; UTV
Fourth round	28 January	Liverpool v Norwich City	14:30	STV Player	STV
Fourth round	28 January	Newport County v Manchester United	16:30	BBC iPlayer	BBC One
Fourth round	29 January	Blackburn Rovers v Wrexham	19:30	BBC iPlayer	BBC One Wales
Fourth round (Replay)	6 February	Plymouth Argyle v Leeds United	19:45	BBC iPlayer	BBC One
Fourth round (Replay)	7 February	Aston Villa v Chelsea	20:00	ITVX	ITV1; UTV
Fourth round (Replay)	7 February	Aston Villa v Chelsea	20:00	STV Player	STV
Fifth round	26 February	Coventry City v Maidstone United	19:45	ITVX	ITV4
Fifth round	27 February	Bournemouth v Leicester City	19:30	BBC iPlayer	—N/a
Fifth round	27 February	Blackburn Rovers v Newcastle United	19:45	BBC iPlayer	BBC One
Fifth round	27 February	Luton Town v Manchester City	20:00	ITVX	ITV1; UTV
Fifth round	27 February	Luton Town v Manchester City	20:00	STV Player	STV
Fifth round	28 February	Chelsea v Leeds United	19:30	ITVX	ITV4
Fifth round	28 February	Wolverhampton Wanderers v Brighton and Hove Albion	19:45	BBC iPlayer	—N/a
Fifth round	28 February	Nottingham Forest v Manchester United	7:45pm	BBC iPlayer	BBC One
Fifth round	28 February	Liverpool v Southampton	20:00	ITVX	ITV1; UTV
Fifth round	28 February	Liverpool v Southampton	20:00	STV Player	STV
Quarter Final	16 March	Wolverhampton Wanderers v Coventry City	12:15	ITVX	ITV1; UTV
Quarter Final	16 March	Wolverhampton Wanderers v Coventry City	12:15	STV Player	STV
Quarter Final	16 March	Manchester City v Newcastle United	17:30	BBC iPlayer	BBC One
Quarter Final	17 March	Chelsea v Leicester City	12:45	BBC iPlayer	BBC One
Quarter Final	17 March	Manchester United v Liverpool	15:30	ITVX	ITV1
Quarter Final	17 March	Manchester United v Liverpool	15:30	STV Player	STV
Semi Final	20 April	Manchester City v Chelsea	17:15	BBC iPlayer	BBC One
Semi Final	21 April	Coventry City v Manchester United	15:30	ITVX	ITV1; UTV
Semi Final	21 April	Coventry City v Manchester United	15:30	STV Player	STV
Final	25 May	Manchester United v Manchester City	15:00	BBC iPlayer	BBC One
Final	25 May	Manchester United v Manchester City	15:00	ITVX	ITV1
Final	25 May	Manchester United v Manchester City	15:00	STV Player	STV
