= 2025–26 Bradford City A.F.C. season =

123rd season in existence of Bradford City AFC

Bradford City
2025–26 season
- Chairman: Stefan Rupp
- Manager: Graham Alexander
- Stadium: Valley Parade
- League One: 4th
- FA Cup: First round
- EFL Cup: Third round
- EFL Trophy: Round of 32
- Top goalscorer: League: Antoni Sarcevic (11); All: Antoni Sarcevic (11)
- Highest home attendance: 24,075 v Huddersfield Town; 13 September 2025 (EFL League One)
- Lowest home attendance: 4,170 v Everton U21; 14 October 2025 (EFL Trophy)
- Average home league attendance: 20,444
- Biggest win: 5–1 v Everton U21 (Home); 14 October 2025 (EFL Trophy)
- Biggest defeat: 1–4 v Newcastle United (Away); 24 September 2025 (EFL Cup); 0–3 v Bolton Wanderers (Away); 2 December 2025 (EFL Trophy); 0–3 v Mansfield Town (Away); 1 January 2026 (EFL League One); 0–3 v Lincoln City (Away); 27 January 2026 (EFL League One)
| Home colours | Away colours | Third colours |

The 2025–26 season is the 123rd season in the history of Bradford City Association Football Club and their first season back in League One since the 2018–19 season following their promotion from League Two in the preceding season. In addition to the domestic league, the club also participated in the FA Cup, the EFL Cup, and the EFL Trophy.

In the cups, Bradford City made it furthest in the EFL Cup, where they were knocked out by Premier League club Newcastle United in the third round. In the league, Bradford City qualified for the play-offs after securing a fourth place finish on the final match-day, having been in a play-off or automatic promotion spot at the end of all but one match day throughout the season. Bradford City were drawn against fifth place Bolton Wanderers, and lost 2–0 on aggregate.

== Squad ==
=== Current squad ===
As of 2 February 2026

| No. | Nationality | Name | Position(s) | Date of birth (age) | Previous club | Notes |
Goalkeepers
| 1 | (England) | Sam Walker | GK | 2 October 1991 (age 35) | (England) Charlton Athletic | — |
| 25 | (England) | Joe Hilton | GK | 11 October 1999 (age 27) | (England) Blackburn Rovers | — |
Defenders
| 3 | (The Gambia) | Ibou Touray | LB | 24 December 1994 (age 31) | (England) Stockport County | — |
| 4 | (Wales) | Joe Wright | CB | 26 February 1995 (age 31) | (Scotland) Kilmarnock | — |
| 5 | (Republic of Ireland) | Neill Byrne | CB | 2 February 1993 (age 33) | (England) Stockport County | — |
| 7 | (England) | Josh Neufville | RB, RW | 22 March 2001 (age 25) | (England) AFC Wimbledon | — |
| 15 | (England) | Aden Baldwin | CB | 10 June 1997 (age 29) | (England) Notts County | — |
| 18 | (Republic of Ireland) | Ciarán Kelly | CB | 4 July 1998 (age 28) | (Republic of Ireland) Bohemians | — |
| 26 | (Jamaica) | Curtis Tilt | CB | 4 August 1991 (age 35) | (England) Salford City | — |
| 28 | (England) | Matthew Pennington | CB | 6 October 1994 (age 32) | (England) Blackpool | — |
| 33 | (Scotland) | Harrison Ashby | RB | 14 November 2001 (age 24) | (England) Newcastle United | on loan |
Midfielders
| 6 | (England) | Max Power | CM, RB | 27 July 1993 (age 33) | (Denmark) AGF | captain |
| 8 | (Wales) | Lee Evans | CM | 24 July 1994 (age 32) | (England) Blackpool | — |
| 10 | (England) | Antoni Sarcevic | CM, AM | 13 March 1992 (age 34) | (England) Stockport County | — |
| 16 | (England) | Alex Pattison | AM | 6 September 1997 (age 29) | (England) Harrogate Town | — |
| 17 | (Republic of Ireland) | Tyreik Wright | LM | 22 September 2001 (age 25) | (England) Plymouth Argyle | — |
| 21 | (England) | Jenson Metcalfe | CM | 6 September 2004 (age 22) | (England) Everton | — |
| 22 | (England) | Nick Powell | AM | 23 March 1994 (age 32) | (England) Stockport County | — |
| 23 | (England) | Bobby Pointon | CM | 4 January 2004 (age 22) | None | — |
| 30 | (England) | Joe White | AM | 1 October 2002 (age 24) | (England) Newcastle United | on loan |
| 32 | (England) | George Lapslie | AM | 5 September 1997 (age 29) | (England) Gillingham | — |
| 40 | (England) | Louie Sibley | CM | 13 September 2001 (age 25) | (England) Oxford United | on loan |
Forwards
| 11 | (England) | Stephen Humphrys | CF | 15 September 1997 (age 29) | (England) Barnsley | — |
| 14 | (England) | Paul Mullin | CF | 6 November 1994 (age 32) | (Wales) Wrexham | on loan |
| 19 | (England) | Kayden Jackson | ST | 22 February 1994 (age 32) | (England) Derby County | — |
| 24 | (England) | Will Swan | CF | 26 October 2000 (age 26) | (England) Crawley Town | — |
| 27 | (England) | Ethan Wheatley | ST | 20 January 2006 (age 20) | (England) Manchester United | on loan |

=== Out on loan ===
| No. | Nationality | Name | Position(s) | Date of birth (age) | Current club | Notes |
|---|---|---|---|---|---|---|
| 9 | (England) | Andy Cook | ST | 18 October 1990 (age 36) | (England) Grimsby Town | Returns June 2026 |
| 29 | (England) | Harry Ibbitson | CF | 10 December 2005 (age 20) | (England) Chorley | Returns June 2026 |
| 12 | (Kenya) | Clarke Oduor | CM, LM | 25 June 1999 (age 27) | (England) Grimsby Town | Returns June 2026 |
| 35 | (Northern Ireland) | George Goodman | CB | 1 December 2006 (age 19) | (England) Guiseley | Returns January 2026 |
| 31 | (England) | Zac Hadi | GK | 13 February 2006 (age 20) | (England) Clitheroe | Returns February 2026 |

== Staff ==
Executive
| Majority owner and chairman | (Germany) Stefan Rupp |
| Chief executive officer | (England) Ryan Sparks |
| General manager | (England) Davide Longo |
| Director and company secretary | (England) Alan Biggin |
| Director of operations | (England) Paula Watson |
Coaching staff
| Manager | (England) Graham Alexander |
| Assistant manager | (England) Chris Lucketti |
| Head of football operations | (England) David Sharpe |
| First team coach/loans manager | (England) Mark Trueman |
| Goalkeeping coach | (Republic of Ireland) Colin Doyle |

== Pre-season and friendlies ==
On 13 June, Bradford City announced their pre-season schedule, with friendlies against FC United of Manchester, Chorley, Pickering Town, Ried II, Campion, Middlesbrough, Oldham Athletic and Bradford (Park Avenue) along with a training camp in Obertraun.

Win Draw Loss Fixtures

| 5 July 2025 Friendly | FC United of Manchester | 0–1 | Bradford City | Moston |
| 15:00 BST | | Report | Trialist 54' | Stadium: Broadhurst Park; Attendance: 1,688 |

| 11 July 2025 Friendly | Chorley | 0–0 | Bradford City | Chorley |
| 19:30 BST | | Report | | Stadium: Victory Park |

| 18 July 2025 Friendly | SK Vorwärts Steyr | 1–7 | Bradford City | Gschwendt, Austria |
| 18:00 CEST | Brajkovic 52' | Report | Pattison 7', 47'; Swan 10'; Byrne 18'; Kavanagh 75', 88'; Humphrys 88' | Stadium: Steinfeldstraße |
Note: Fixture was originally against Ried II, but was changed on July 17.

| 23 July 2025 Friendly | Bradford City | 2–0 | Middlesbrough | Bradford |
| 19:00 BST | Sarcevic 44' (pen.); Swan 90+5' | Report | | Stadium: Valley Parade; Attendance: 5,139 (1,075 away) |

| 26 July 2025 Friendly | Oldham Athletic | 0–1 | Bradford City | Oldham |
| 13:00 BST | | | Humphrys 65' | Stadium: Boundary Park |

== Competitions ==
=== League One ===
==== League table ====
| Pos | Team | Pld | W | D | L | GF | GA | GD | Pts | Promotion, qualification or relegation |
|---|---|---|---|---|---|---|---|---|---|---|
| 2 | Cardiff City (P) | 46 | 27 | 10 | 9 | 90 | 50 | +40 | 91 | Promotion to EFL Championship |
| 3 | Stockport County | 46 | 22 | 11 | 13 | 71 | 58 | +13 | 77 | Qualification for League One play-offs |
| 4 | Bradford City | 46 | 22 | 11 | 13 | 58 | 51 | +7 | 77 | Qualification for League One play-offs |
| 5 | Bolton Wanderers (O, P) | 46 | 19 | 18 | 9 | 70 | 52 | +18 | 75 | Qualification for League One play-offs |
| 6 | Stevenage | 46 | 21 | 12 | 13 | 49 | 46 | +3 | 75 | Qualification for League One play-offs |

Source: EFL Official Website
Rules for classification: 1) Points; 2) Goal difference; 3) Number of goals scored; 4) Head-to-head results; 5) Wins; 6) Away goals; 7) Penalty points (sec 9.5); 8) 12-point sending off offences
(O) Play-off winners; (P) Promoted

==== Results summary ====
| Overall | | | | | | | | Home | | | | | | Away | | | | | |
| Pld | W | D | L | GF | GA | GD | Pts | W | D | L | GF | GA | GD | W | D | L | GF | GA | GD |
|---|---|---|---|---|---|---|---|---|---|---|---|---|---|---|---|---|---|---|---|
| 46 | 22 | 11 | 13 | 58 | 51 | +7 | 77 | 15 | 5 | 3 | 32 | 17 | +15 | 7 | 6 | 10 | 26 | 34 | −8 |

Last updated: 2 May 2026.
Source: Soccerway

==== Results by round ====
| Round | 1 | 2 | 3 | 4 | 5 | 6 | 7 | 8 | 9 | 10 | 11 | 13 | 14 | 12^{1} | 15 | 17 | 18 | 16^{2} | 20 | 21 | 22 | 23 | 24 | 25 | 27 | 28 | 29 | 30 | 31 | 32 | 33 | 34 | 26^{4} | 35 | 36 | 19^{3} | 37 | 38 | 39 | 41 | 42 | 43 | 44 | 40^{5} | 45 | 46 |
|---|---|---|---|---|---|---|---|---|---|---|---|---|---|---|---|---|---|---|---|---|---|---|---|---|---|---|---|---|---|---|---|---|---|---|---|---|---|---|---|---|---|---|---|---|---|---|
| Ground | H | A | H | A | A | H | A | H | A | H | A | H | A | H | H | A | H | A | H | A | H | H | A | A | H | A | A | H | A | H | H | A | H | A | H | A | A | H | A | H | A | H | A | H | H | A |
| Result | W | D | W | W | D | W | L | W | W | W | D | D | D | D | L | D | W | W | W | L | W | W | L | W | L | L | L | W | L | W | W | L | W | L | W | W | L | D | L | W | W | L | D | D | D | W |
| Position | 6 | 7 | 6 | 4 | 4 | 3 | 5 | 2 | 1 | 1 | 2 | 3 | 4 | 2 | 2 | 2 | 3 | 2 | 2 | 3 | 3 | 3 | 3 | 3 | 3 | 4 | 5 | 5 | 6 | 5 | 4 | 5 | 4 | 4 | 4 | 4 | 4 | 4 | 4 | 4 | 3 | 3 | 4 | 4 | 5 | 4 |
| Points | 3 | 4 | 7 | 10 | 11 | 14 | 14 | 17 | 20 | 23 | 24 | 25 | 26 | 27 | 27 | 28 | 31 | 34 | 37 | 37 | 40 | 43 | 43 | 46 | 46 | 46 | 46 | 49 | 49 | 52 | 55 | 55 | 58 | 58 | 61 | 64 | 64 | 65 | 65 | 68 | 71 | 71 | 72 | 73 | 74 | 77 |

Source: EFL
A = Away; H = Home; W = Win; D = Draw; L = Loss; P = Postponed
Notes:
- ^{1} Matchday 12 (vs Lincoln City) was postponed due to the international call-ups.
- ^{2} Matchday 16 (vs Plymouth Argyle) was postponed due to the international call-ups.
- ^{3} Matchday 19 (vs Port Vale) was postponed due to weather.
- ^{4} Matchday 26 (vs Rotherham) was postponed due to a frozen pitch.
- ^{5} Matchday 40 (vs Plymouth Argyle) was postponed due to the international call-ups.

==== Matches ====
On 26 June, the League One fixtures were announced, with Bradford hosting Wycombe Wanderers on the opening weekend.

Win Draw Loss Fixtures

| 2 August 2025 1 | Bradford City | 2–1 | Wycombe Wanderers | Bradford |
| 15:00 BST | Sarcevic 6'; Pointon 13'; J. Wright (yellow card) 67'; T. Wright (yellow card) 87'; Power (yellow card) 90+2' | Report | Hagelskjær (yellow card) 16'; Udoh 68'; Leahy (yellow card) 71'; Norris (yellow card) 72'; Harvie (yellow card) 86' | Stadium: Valley Parade; Attendance: 19,604 (580 away); Referee: Seb Stockbridge |

| 9 August 2025 2 | Northampton Town | 0–0 | Bradford City | Northampton |
| 15:00 BST | McGeehan (yellow card) 29'; List (yellow card) 40' | Report | Pointin (yellow card) 29'; Neufville (yellow card) 58'; Pennington (yellow card) 82'; Swan (yellow card) 87'; Tilt (yellow card) 90+2' | Stadium: Sixfields Stadium; Attendance: 7,295 (1,546 away); Referee: Simon Mather |

| 16 August 2025 3 | Bradford City | 2–1 | Luton Town | Bradford |
| 15:00 BST | Pointon (yellow card) 30', (goal) 48'; Humphrys 33'; Power (yellow card) 82' | Report | Alli (yellow card) 17'; Lonwijk (yellow card) 27'; Kodua 86' | Stadium: Valley Parade; Attendance: 20,233 (1,338 away); Referee: Edward Duckworth |

| 19 August 2025 4 | Stockport County | 1–2 | Bradford City | Edgeley |
| 19:45 BST | Moxon 16', (yellow card) 74' | Report | Tilt (yellow card) 43'; Swan 49'; Sarcevic 72'; Leigh (yellow card) 90+1' | Stadium: Edgeley Park; Attendance: 9,641; Referee: Thomas Parsons |

| 23 August 2025 5 | Peterborough United | 1–1 | Bradford City | Peterborough |
| 15:00 BST | Collins (yellow card) 13'; Hayes 90+1' | Report | Baldwin (yellow card) 34'; Swan 55' | Stadium: London Road Stadium; Attendance: 8,874; Referee: James Durkin |

| 30 August 2025 6 | Bradford City | 3–2 | AFC Wimbledon | Bradford |
| 15:00 BST | J. Wright 32'; Pointon 61'; Swan 83' | Report | Browne 25'; Stevens 53'; Reeves (yellow card) 78' | Stadium: Valley Parade; Attendance: 19,076 (471 away); Referee: Martin Coy |

| 6 September 2025 7 | Doncaster Rovers | 3–1 | Bradford City | Doncaster |
| 3:00 BST | Molyneux 6'; Gibson 22'; Sharp 44' | Report | Swan 12'; Tilt (yellow card) 44'; T. Wright (yellow card) 53' | Stadium: Eco-Power Stadium; Attendance: 11,191; Referee: Alex Chilowicz |

| 13 September 2025 8 | Bradford City | 3–1 | Huddersfield Town | Bradford |
| 12:30 BST | Pointon 18', 45+4'; Neufville 45+6'; Power (yellow card) 65' | Report | Roosken (yellow card) 13'; Wallace (yellow card) 37'; Castledine (yellow card) 53'; Ledson (yellow card) 58'; Kane (yellow card) 61'; Redmond 80' | Stadium: Valley Parade; Attendance: 24,075; Referee: Scott Oldham |
Note: Fixture was originally scheduled for a 15:00 kick-off, but was moved live Sky Sports broadcasting.

| 20 September 2025 9 | Cardiff City | 1–3 | Bradford City | Cardiff |
| 15:00 BST | Osho (yellow card) 29'; Wintle (yellow card) 45'; Robinson 77'; J. Colwill (yellow card) 90+4'; R. Colwill (yellow card) 90+8' | Report | Leigh 16'; Sarcevic 30', (yellow card) 77'; Neufville (yellow card) 43', (goal) 49'; T. Wright (yellow card) 90+6' | Stadium: Cardiff City Stadium; Attendance: 22,132; Referee: Martin Woods |

| 27 September 2025 10 | Bradford City | 1–0 | Blackpool | Bradford |
| 15:00 BST | Power (yellow card) 7'; Touray (yellow card) 23'; McIntyre (yellow card) 45'; Neufville 51' | Report | | Stadium: Valley Parade; Attendance: 21,531; Referee: Ben Atkinson |

| 2 October 2025 11 | Rotherham United | 2–2 | Bradford City | Rotherham |
| 20:00 BST | Hall 20', (yellow card) 54'; Powell (yellow card) 36'; Baptiste (yellow card) 39'; Sherif 50'; Dawson (yellow card) 70' | Report | Swan (yellow card) 39'; Pointon (yellow card) 53'; Sarcevic 56'; McIntyre (yellow card) 58'; Leigh (yellow card) 64'; Pattison 81' | Stadium: New York Stadium; Attendance: 9,546 (2,453 away); Referee: Oliver Yates |
Note: Fixture was originally scheduled for 4 October, but was rescheduled for live Sky Sports broadcasting.

| 18 October 2025 13 | Bradford City | 2–2 | Barnsley | Bradford |
| 15:00 BST | Sarcevic 9'; Humphrys 45+5' | Report | Cleary 24'; Ogbeta (yellow card) 45+3'; Kelly 64' | Stadium: Valley Parade; Attendance: 22,228; Referee: Andrew Humphries |

| 25 October 2025 14 | Stevenage | 1–1 | Bradford City | Stevenage |
| 15:00 BST | Houghton (yellow card) 13'; White 18'; Piergianni (yellow card) 27'; Butler (yellow card) 74' | Report | Byrne 3'; Touray (yellow card) 44'; Kavanagh (yellow card) 47'; J. Wright (yellow card) 65' | Stadium: Broadhall Way; Attendance: 5,279; Referee: Sam Allison |

| 28 October 2025 12 | Bradford City | 0–0 | Lincoln City | Bradford |
| 19:45 GMT | Metcalfe (yellow card) 38'; Power (yellow card) 76' | Report | | Stadium: Valley Parade; Attendance: 19,787; Referee: Elliot Bell |
Note: Fixture was originally scheduled for 11 October, but was postponed due to international call-ups.

| 8 November 2025 15 | Bradford City | 1–2 | Burton Albion | Bradford |
| 15:00 GMT | Pennington (yellow card) 32'; Pointon (yellow card) 45+3', (goal) 76' (pen.) | Report | Armer (yellow card) 35'; Beesley 41', (yellow card) 84'; Webster 45+1'; Hartridge (yellow card) 75'; Chauke (yellow card) 90+1' | Stadium: Valley Parade; Attendance: 20,508; Referee: Craig Hicks |

| 22 November 2025 17 | Bolton Wanderers | 0–0 | Bradford City | Bolton |
| 15:00 GMT | Sheehan (yellow card) 38'; Johnston (yellow card) 67' | Report | Touray (yellow card) 17'; Pennington (yellow card) 29'; Power (yellow card) 90+4' | Stadium: Toughsheet Community Stadium; Attendance: 26,473; Referee: Darren Drysdale |

| 29 November 2025 18 | Bradford City | 1–0 | Exeter City | Bradford |
| 15:00 GMT | J. Wright 20'; Power (yellow card) 30'; Pointon (yellow card) 76'; Walker (yellow card) 89' | Report | Sweeney (yellow card) 57'; Wareham (yellow card) 88' | Stadium: Valley Parade; Attendance: 19,713; Referee: Richard Eley |

| 6 December 2025 16 | Plymouth Argyle | 0–1 | Bradford City | Plymouth |
| 12:30 GMT | Boateng (yellow card) 67' | Report | Sarcevic 57'; Metcalfe (yellow card) 65'; Power (yellow card) 68'; Halliday (yellow card) 90+5' | Stadium: Home Park; Referee: Thomas Parsons |
Note: Fixture was originally scheduled for 15 November, but was postponed due to international call-ups.

| 13 December 2025 20 | Bradford City | 2–0 | Reading | Bradford |
| 15:00 GMT | Sarcevic 56'; Pointon 84'; Halliday (yellow card) 86' | Report | Ehibhatiomhan (yellow card) 41'; O'Connor (yellow card) 47'; Abrefa (yellow card) 90+2' | Stadium: Valley Parade; Attendance: 19,123; Referee: Paul Howard |

| 20 December 2025 21 | Leyton Orient | 2–1 | Bradford City | Leyton |
| 15:00 GMT | Ballard 36', 58'; Bakinson (yellow card) 45'; Wellens (yellow card) 65'; Happe (yellow card) 75' | Report | Humphrys 17'; J. Wright (yellow card) 28'; Halliday (yellow card) 55'; Baldwin (yellow card) 77' | Stadium: Brisbane Road; Attendance: 8,693 (1,242 away); Referee: Will Finnie |

| 26 December 2025 22 | Bradford City | 2–1 | Wigan Athletic | Bradford |
| 15:00 GMT | Humphrys 45'; Metcalfe (yellow card) 46'; Power (yellow card) 65'; J. Wright 90' | Report | Weir (yellow card) 27' (yellow-red card) 70'; Aimson (yellow card) 54'; Wright 63'; Smith (red card) 86' | Stadium: Valley Parade; Attendance: 22,698; Referee: Seb Stockbridge |

| 29 December 2025 23 | Bradford City | 1–0 | Port Vale | Bradford |
| 19:45 GMT | Tilt (yellow card) 54'; Metcalfe 67'; Sarcevic (yellow card) 90+5'; Touray (yellow card) 90+8' | Report | John (yellow card) 12'; Headley (yellow card) 14'; Stockley (yellow card) 49' | Stadium: Valley Parade; Attendance: 19,697; Referee: Scott Oldham |

| 1 January 2026 24 | Mansfield Town | 3–0 | Bradford City | Mansfield |
| 15:00 GMT | Oates 22', 67'; Akins 37', (yellow card) 89'; Oshilaja (yellow card) 53' | Report | | Stadium: Field Mill; Attendance: 9,077; Referee: Ross Joyce |

| 4 January 2026 25 | Blackpool | 1–2 | Bradford City | Blackpool |
| 15:00 GMT | Fletcher 56' | Report | Baldwin 25'; Swan (yellow card) 45+3', (goal) 67'; Leigh (yellow card) 90+1' | Stadium: Bloomfield Road; Attendance: 10,894; Referee: Simon Mather |

| 17 January 2026 27 | Bradford City | 1–2 | Cardiff City | Bradford |
| 12:30 GMT | Tilt (yellow card) 26'; Metcalfe 59'; Baldwin (yellow card) 70'; White (yellow card) 87' | Report | Turnbull 14'; Chambers 24'; Willock (yellow card) 31'; J. Colwill (yellow card) 27' | Stadium: Valley Parade; Attendance: 21,571; Referee: David Rock |
Note: Fixture was initially scheduled for a 15:00 kick-off, but was rescheduled for live Sky Sports broadcasting.

| 24 January 2026 28 | Huddersfield Town | 1–0 | Bradford City | Huddersfield |
| 12:30 GMT | McGuane (yellow card) 9' (yellow-red card) 62'; Harness 23'; Nicholls (yellow card) 78'; Mumba (yellow card) 81' | Report | Neufville (yellow card) 41' | Stadium: Kirklees Stadium; Attendance: 21,422; Referee: Edward Duckworth |
Note: Fixture was initially scheduled for a 15:00 kick-off, but was rescheduled following advice from the West Yorkshire Police.

| 27 January 2026 29 | Lincoln City | 3–0 | Bradford City | Lincoln |
| 19:45 GMT | Draper 7'; Moylan 41'; Reach (yellow card) 52'; House 86' | Report | Pennington (yellow card) 43' | Stadium: Sincil Bank; Attendance: 10,064; Referee: Stephen Parkinson |

| 31 January 2026 30 | Bradford City | 1–0 | Doncaster Rovers | Bradford |
| 12:30 GMT | Baldwin (yellow card) 53'; Mullin (yellow card) 71'; T. Wright 81' | Report | Hanlan (yellow card) 80' | Stadium: Valley Parade; Attendance: 19,775; Referee: Craig Hicks |
Note: Fixture was initially scheduled for a 15:00 kick-off, but was rescheduled for live Sky Sports broadcasting.

| 7 February 2026 31 | Luton Town | 2–1 | Bradford City | Luton |
| 12:30 GMT | Richards 39'; Morris 55'; Palmer (yellow card) 67'; Keeley (yellow card) 75' | Report | Tilt (yellow card) 27'; Neufville (yellow card) 43'; Humphrys 90+6' | Stadium: Kenilworth Road; Attendance: 11,000; Referee: Richard Eley |
Note: Fixture was initially scheduled for a 15:00 kick-off, but was rescheduled for live Sky Sports broadcasting.

| 14 February 2026 32 | Bradford City | 2–0 | Peterborough United | Bradford |
| 15:00 GMT | Pointon 5'; T. Wright (yellow card) 16'; Tilt (yellow card) 31'; Jackson 50'; Power (yellow card) 66' | Report | Morgan (yellow card) 41'; Leonard (yellow card) 45+2'; Khela (yellow card) 60' | Stadium: Valley Parade; Attendance: 19,389; Referee: Sam Allison |

| 17 February 2026 33 | Bradford City | 1–0 | Stockport County | Bradford |
| 19:45 GMT | Tilt (yellow card) 24'; Wheatley (yellow card) 42'; Sarcevic 48'; Jackson (yellow card) 90+3' | Report | Sidibeh (yellow card) 14'; Bailey (yellow card) 90+5' | Stadium: Valley Parade; Attendance: 22,488; Referee: Ross Joyce |

| 21 February 2026 34 | AFC Wimbledon | 3–1 | Bradford City | London |
| 15:00 GMT | Tilley 11'; Hippolyte (yellow card) 35'; Browne 42'; Stevens 67' | Report | Humphrys 76' | Stadium: Plough Lane; Referee: Ross Martin |

| 24 February 2026 26 | Bradford City | 1–0 | Rotherham United | Bradford |
| 19:45 GMT | Pennington 11'; T. Wright (yellow card) 84' | Report | Adegboyega (yellow card) 84' | Stadium: Valley Parade; Attendance: 18,187; Referee: Martin Woods |
Note: Fixture was originally scheduled for 10 January, but it was postponed due to a frozen pitch.

| 28 February 2026 35 | Reading | 2–1 | Bradford City | Reading |
| 15:00 GMT | D. Williams (yellow card) 34'; Patton (yellow card) 87'; Lane 90'; Ritchie 90+7'; Ehibhatiomhan (yellow card) 90+10' | Report | Pennington 68' | Stadium: Madejski Stadium; Attendance: 13,106; Referee: Ben Speedie |

| 7 March 2026 36 | Bradford City | 2–1 | Leyton Orient | Bradford |
| 15:00 GMT | Sarcevic 33', 79', (yellow card) 86'; Pennington (yellow card) 59'; T. Wright (yellow card) 61'; Tilt (yellow card) 61'; Power (yellow card) 67'; Baldwin (red card) 75'; Mullin (yellow card) 87' | Report | Koroma (yellow card) 26'; O'Neill 43'; Clare (yellow card) 44'; Fawunmi (yellow card) 54' | Stadium: Valley Parade; Attendance: 20,123; Referee: Ollie Yates |

| 11 March 2025 19 | Port Vale | 0–2 | Bradford City | Stoke-on-Trent |
| 19:45 GMT | Campbell (yellow card) 61'; Hall (yellow card) 85' | Report | Pointon 31'; Power (yellow card) 51'; T. Wright 66', (yellow card) 90' | Stadium: Vale Park; Attendance: 6,098; Referee: Paul Howard |
Note: Fixture was originally scheduled for 9 December, but was postponed due to adverse weather.

| 14 March 2026 37 | Wigan Athletic | 2–0 | Bradford City | Wigan |
| 15:00 GMT | Vickers 20'; Aimson (yellow card) 31'; Kerr (yellow card) 39'; Weir (yellow card) 68'; Taylor 78'; Raphael (yellow card) 82' | Report | Touray (yellow card) 66'; Ashby (yellow card) 90+5' | Stadium: Brick Community Stadium; Attendance: 16,710; Referee: Andrew Humphries |

| 17 March 2026 38 | Bradford City | 1–1 | Mansfield Town | Bradford |
| 19:45 GMT | Pointon (yellow card) 37'; Tilt (yellow card) 59'; T. Wright 72'; Sarcevic (yellow card) 85'; Pennington (yellow card) 90+2' | Report | Adeboyejo 20'; Knoyle (yellow card) 31'; Russell (yellow card) 70' | Stadium: Valley Parade; Attendance: 19,716; Referee: James Oldham |

| 21 March 2026 39 | Burton Albion | 2–1 | Bradford City | Burton upon Trent |
| 15:00 GMT | Hartridge 41'; Shade 58'; Collins (yellow card) 90+9' | Report | Pointon (yellow card) 18'; Baldwin (yellow card) 41'; Wheatley (yellow card) 76'; Metcalfe (yellow card) 77'; T. Wright 90+2'; Pennington (yellow card) 90+7' | Stadium: Pirelli Stadium; Attendance: 4,522; Referee: Carl Brook |

| 3 April 2026 41 | Bradford City | 1–0 | Northampton Town | Bradford |
| 15:00 BST | Humphrys 14'; Metcalfe (yellow card) 55'; Power (yellow card) 86'; Pennington (yellow card) 90' | Report | Moore (yellow card) 77' | Stadium: Valley Parade; Attendance: 19,105; Referee: Martin Coy |

| 6 April 2026 42 | Wycombe Wanderers | 1–2 | Bradford City | High Wycombe |
| 15:00 BST | Vidigal 6'; Harvie (yellow card) 66' | Report | Touray (yellow card) 36'; Pointon 52'; Baldwin 68'; Ashby (yellow card) 80'; Metcalfe (yellow card) 90'; Jackson (yellow card) 90+6' | Stadium: Adams Park; Attendance: 6,718; Referee: Will Finnie |

| 11 April 2026 43 | Bradford City | 0–1 | Stevenage | Bradford |
| 15:00 BST | Tilt (yellow card) 64'; Touray (yellow card) 90+1' | Report | Kemp 61', (yellow card) 64'; Goode (yellow card) 73'; Sweeney (yellow card) 76' | Stadium: Valley Parade; Attendance: 19,367; Referee: Tom Reeves |

| 18 April 2026 44 | Barnsley | 2–2 | Bradford City | Barnsley |
| 12:30 BST | Yoganathan (red card) 8'; O'Connell 50'; Bland (yellow card) 71'; Cleary (yellow card) 76'; Farrell 90+6' | Report | Swan (yellow card) 33'; Touray (yellow card) 55'; Metcalfe (yellow card) 65'; Powell 73'; Roberts 82' (o.g.) | Stadium: Oakwell; Attendance: 14,936; Referee: Charles Breakspear |
Note: Fixture was initially scheduled for a 15:00 kick-off, but was brought forward for live Sky Sports broadcasting.

| 21 April 2026 40 | Bradford City | 1–1 | Plymouth Argyle | Bradford |
| 19:45 BST | Swan 72'; Lapslie (yellow card) 90+4' | Report | Sarpong-Wiredu 8'; Mitchell (yellow card) 25'; Boateng (yellow card) 36'; Dale (yellow card) 55'; Sorinola (yellow card) 74'; Pepple (yellow card) 84' | Stadium: Valley Parade; Attendance: 18,475; Referee: Jamie O'Connor |
Note: Fixture was initially scheduled for 28 March, but was rearranged due to international call-ups.

| 25 April 2026 45 | Bradford City | 1–1 | Bolton Wanderers | Bradford |
| 15:00 BST | Neufville (yellow card) 15'; J. Wright (yellow card) 36'; Jackson 80' | Report | Kenny 72'; Johnston (yellow card) 79'; Forino-Joseph (yellow card) 90+1' | Stadium: Valley Parade; Attendance: 23,732; Referee: Seb Stockbridge |

| 2 May 2026 46 | Exeter City | 1–2 | Bradford City | Exeter |
| 15:00 BST | James (yellow card) 15'; Oluwabori (yellow card) 43'; Rydel (yellow card) 86'; Magennis 90+3' | Report | Jackson 27'; Power (yellow card) 51'; Sarcevic 79' | Stadium: St James Park; Referee: Ollie Yates |

==== Play-offs ====
On the final match day of the regular season, Bradford City defeated Exeter City 2–1 to secure a fourth place finish and a play-offs berth. As a result, Bradford City were drawn against fifth place Bolton Wanderers, who were third going into the match day, but lost 3–2 to Luton Town to drop down to fifth place behind Bradford City. Bradford City ultimately lost 2–0 on aggregate to Bolton Wanderers, conceding once both home and away.

| 9 May 2026 Semi-final (1st leg) | Bolton Wanderers | 1–0 | Bradford City | Bolton |
| 20:00 BST | Cozier-Duberry 60' | Report | Neufville (yellow card) 33' | Stadium: Toughsheet Community Stadium; Attendance: 22,789; Referee: Martin Coy |

| 14 May 2026 Semi-final (2nd leg) | Bradford City | 0–1 | Bolton Wanderers | Bradford |
| 20:00 BST | Baldwin (yellow card) 90+1' | Report | Simons 81' | Stadium: Valley Parade; Attendance: 22,381; Referee: Thomas Kirk |

=== FA Cup ===
Bradford were drawn away to Cheltenham Town in the first round, whom eliminated them.

Win Draw Loss Fixtures

| 1 November 2025 First round | Cheltenham Town | 1–0 | Bradford City | Cheltenham |
| 15:00 GMT | Hutchinson 2'; Jude-Boyd (yellow card) 53' | Report | T. Wright (yellow card) 2'; Pennington (yellow card) 16'; Byrne (yellow card) 79' | Stadium: Whaddon Road; Attendance: 3,075; Referee: Robert Massey-Ellis |

=== EFL Cup ===
Bradford were drawn away to Blackburn Rovers in the first round, to Stoke City in the second round, and to the title holders, Newcastle United, in the third round. Bradford were eliminated by Newcastle United.

Win Draw Loss Fixtures

| 12 August 2025 First round | Blackburn Rovers | 1–2 | Bradford City | Blackburn |
| 19:45 BST | Tronstad (yellow card) 14'; De Neve 45+4'; Gueye (yellow card) 68'; Kargbo (yellow card) 88' | Report | Touray 2'; Swan 4'; Lapslie (yellow card) 36'; Tilt (yellow card) 78'; Humphrys (yellow card) 90+4' | Stadium: Ewood Park; Attendance: 9,855; Referee: Anthony Backhouse |

| 26 August 2025 Second round | Stoke City | 0–3 | Bradford City | Stoke-on-Trent |
| 19:45 BST | | Report | Swan 12'; Halliday 31'; Kelly (yellow card) 39'; Metcalfe (yellow card) 55'; Lapslie 62' | Stadium: bet365 Stadium; Attendance: 9,947; Referee: Leigh Doughty |

| 24 September 2025 Third round | Newcastle United | 4–1 | Bradford City | Newcastle upon Tyne |
| 19:45 BST | Joelinton 17', 75'; Osula 19', 87' | Report | Leigh (yellow card) 41'; Cook 79' | Stadium: St James' Park; Attendance: 51,249; Referee: Thomas Kirk |

=== EFL Trophy ===
Bradford were drawn against Doncaster Rovers, Grimsby Town and Everton U21 in the group stage. After finishing second in the group, City were drawn away to Bolton Wanderers in the round of 32, who eliminated them.

| Pos | Div | Team | Pld | W | PW | PL | L | GF | GA | GD | Pts | Qualification |
|---|---|---|---|---|---|---|---|---|---|---|---|---|
| 1 | L1 | Doncaster Rovers | 3 | 3 | 0 | 0 | 0 | 8 | 2 | +6 | 9 | Advance to Round 2 |
| 2 | L1 | Bradford City | 3 | 2 | 0 | 0 | 1 | 8 | 5 | +3 | 6 | Advance to Round 2 |
| 3 | L2 | Grimsby Town | 3 | 1 | 0 | 0 | 2 | 6 | 8 | −2 | 3 | |
| 4 | ACA | Everton U21 | 3 | 0 | 0 | 0 | 3 | 5 | 12 | −7 | 0 | |

Source: EFL

Win Draw Loss Fixtures

| 2 September 2025 Group C | Bradford City | 2–1 | Grimsby Town | Bradford |
| 19:30 BST | Metcalfe (yellow card) 31'; Lapslie (yellow card) 61'; Cook 76', 90+5' | Report | Onoh (yellow card) 3'; Brown (red card) 26'; Rose 45+3' (pen.); Staunton (yellow card) 61' | Stadium: Valley Parade; Attendance: 4,771; Referee: Paul Marsden |

| 14 October 2025 Group C | Bradford City | 5–1 | Everton U21 | Bradford |
| 19:30 BST | Kavanagh 7'; Humphrys 14', 21'; Byrne (yellow card) 23'; Lapslie 41'; Kelly (yellow card) 54'; Hilton (yellow card) 78'; Pattison 86'; Leigh (yellow card) 90+11' | Report | Patterson (yellow card) 45+1'; Wright 73' (o.g.); Benjamin (yellow card) 76'; Tamen (yellow card) 90+1'; Gomez (yellow card) 90+11'; Finney (yellow card) 90+12' | Stadium: Valley Parade; Attendance: 4,170 (64 away); Referee: James Oldham |

| 11 November 2025 Group C | Doncaster Rovers | 3–1 | Bradford City | Doncaster |
| 19:00 GMT | Gibson 64', 78'; Hanlan 70' | Report | T. Wright 39' | Stadium: Eco-Power Stadium |

| 2 December 2025 Round of 32 | Bolton Wanderers | 3–0 | Bradford City | Horwich |
| 14:00 GMT | Cissoko 11', 20'; Forss 69' | Report | Touray (yellow card) 70'; Neufville (yellow card) 71' | Stadium: Toughsheet Community Stadium; Attendance: 2,500; Referee: David Rock |

== Squad statistics ==
=== Appearances ===
As of match played 14 May 2026

Starting appearances are listed first, followed by substitute appearances after the + symbol where applicable.
Players with no appearances are not included on the list

| No. | Pos | Nat | Player | Total | | League One | | Play-offs | | FA Cup | | EFL Cup | | EFL Trophy | |
| No. | Pos | Nat | Player | Apps | Goals | Apps | Goals | Apps | Goals | Apps | Goals | Apps | Goals | Apps | Goals |
Goalkeepers
| 1 | GK | (England) ENG | Sam Walker | 53 | 0 | 46+0 | 0 | 2+0 | 0 | 1+0 | 0 | 3+0 | 0 | 1+0 | 0 |
| 25 | GK | (England) ENG | Joe Hilton | 3 | 0 | 0 | 0 | 0 | 0 | 0 | 0 | 0 | 0 | 3+0 | 0 |
Defenders
| 3 | DF | (The Gambia) GAM | Ibou Touray | 52 | 1 | 41+1 | 0 | 2+0 | 0 | 0+1 | 0 | 3+0 | 1 | 2+2 | 0 |
| 4 | DF | (Wales) WAL | Joe Wright | 34 | 3 | 21+6 | 3 | 2+0 | 0 | 0 | 0 | 2+0 | 0 | 3+0 | 0 |
| 7 | DF | (England) ENG | Josh Neufville | 52 | 3 | 39+4 | 3 | 2+0 | 0 | 0+1 | 0 | 1+2 | 0 | 0+3 | 0 |
| 15 | DF | (England) ENG | Aden Baldwin | 39 | 2 | 29+4 | 2 | 2+0 | 0 | 0 | 0 | 2+0 | 0 | 1+1 | 0 |
| 18 | DF | (Republic of Ireland) IRL | Ciarán Kelly | 24 | 0 | 12+6 | 0 | 0 | 0 | 0 | 0 | 3+0 | 0 | 2+1 | 0 |
| 26 | DF | (Jamaica) JAM | Curtis Tilt | 35 | 0 | 31+1 | 0 | 2+0 | 0 | 0 | 0 | 0+1 | 0 | 0 | 0 |
| 28 | DF | (England) ENG | Matthew Pennington | 32 | 2 | 25+4 | 2 | 0 | 0 | 1+0 | 0 | 1+1 | 0 | 0 | 0 |
| 33 | DF | (Scotland) SCO | Harrison Ashby | 8 | 0 | 2+6 | 0 | 0 | 0 | 0 | 0 | 0 | 0 | 0 | 0 |
Midfielders
| 6 | MF | (England) ENG | Max Power | 51 | 0 | 43+0 | 0 | 2+0 | 0 | 1+0 | 0 | 2+0 | 0 | 2+1 | 0 |
| 8 | MF | (Wales) WAL | Lee Evans | 8 | 0 | 3+5 | 0 | 0 | 0 | 0 | 0 | 0 | 0 | 0 | 0 |
| 10 | MF | (England) ENG | Antoni Sarcevic | 42 | 11 | 32+6 | 11 | 2+0 | 0 | 0 | 0 | 0+2 | 0 | 0 | 0 |
| 17 | MF | (Republic of Ireland) IRL | Tyreik Wright | 43 | 5 | 25+10 | 4 | 0+2 | 0 | 1+0 | 0 | 2+1 | 0 | 1+1 | 1 |
| 21 | MF | (England) ENG | Jenson Metcalfe | 49 | 2 | 32+9 | 2 | 2+0 | 0 | 0 | 0 | 2+0 | 0 | 4+0 | 0 |
| 22 | MF | (England) ENG | Nick Powell | 14 | 1 | 0+10 | 1 | 0+2 | 0 | 0 | 0 | 1+1 | 0 | 0 | 0 |
| 23 | MF | (England) ENG | Bobby Pointon | 38 | 10 | 30+3 | 10 | 1+0 | 0 | 0 | 0 | 1+1 | 0 | 2+0 | 0 |
| 30 | MF | (England) ENG | Joe White | 3 | 0 | 1+2 | 0 | 0 | 0 | 0 | 0 | 0 | 0 | 0 | 0 |
| 32 | MF | (England) ENG | George Lapslie | 20 | 2 | 4+7 | 0 | 1+1 | 0 | 1+0 | 0 | 2+0 | 1 | 4+0 | 1 |
| 40 | MF | (England) ENG | Louie Sibley | 4 | 0 | 1+3 | 0 | 0 | 0 | 0 | 0 | 0 | 0 | 0 | 0 |
Forwards
| 11 | FW | (England) ENG | Stephen Humphrys | 45 | 9 | 23+14 | 7 | 0+1 | 0 | 0+1 | 0 | 1+1 | 0 | 3+1 | 2 |
| 14 | FW | (England) ENG | Paul Mullin | 9 | 0 | 2+7 | 0 | 0 | 0 | 0 | 0 | 0 | 0 | 0 | 0 |
| 19 | FW | (England) ENG | Kayden Jackson | 14 | 3 | 9+3 | 3 | 2+0 | 0 | 0 | 0 | 0 | 0 | 0 | 0 |
| 24 | FW | (England) ENG | Will Swan | 36 | 8 | 13+16 | 6 | 0+1 | 0 | 0+1 | 0 | 2+0 | 2 | 0+3 | 0 |
| 27 | FW | (England) ENG | Ethan Wheatley | 11 | 0 | 4+7 | 0 | 0 | 0 | 0 | 0 | 0 | 0 | 0 | 0 |
Player(s) who featured but departed the club permanently or on loan during the season:
| 2 | DF | (England) ENG | Brad Halliday | 16 | 1 | 4+6 | 0 | 0 | 0 | 1+0 | 0 | 2+0 | 1 | 3+0 | 0 |
| 5 | DF | (Republic of Ireland) IRL | Neill Byrne | 12 | 1 | 5+3 | 1 | 0 | 0 | 1+0 | 0 | 0 | 0 | 3+0 | 0 |
| 8 | FW | (Republic of Ireland) IRL | Calum Kavanagh | 8 | 1 | 5+2 | 0 | 0 | 0 | 0 | 0 | 0 | 0 | 1+0 | 1 |
| 9 | FW | (England) ENG | Andy Cook | 12 | 3 | 0+7 | 0 | 0 | 0 | 1+0 | 0 | 0+1 | 1 | 1+2 | 2 |
| 14 | DF | (Scotland) SCO | Tom McIntyre | 11 | 0 | 3+4 | 0 | 0 | 0 | 1+0 | 0 | 0+1 | 0 | 1+1 | 0 |
| 16 | MF | (England) ENG | Alex Pattison | 16 | 2 | 6+5 | 1 | 0 | 0 | 0+1 | 0 | 0+1 | 0 | 2+1 | 1 |
| 19 | DF | (Republic of Ireland) IRL | Lewis Richards | 4 | 0 | 0 | 0 | 0 | 0 | 1+0 | 0 | 0 | 0 | 3+0 | 0 |
| 20 | MF | (England) ENG | Tommy Leigh | 23 | 1 | 10+6 | 1 | 0 | 0 | 1+0 | 0 | 2+1 | 0 | 1+2 | 0 |

== Player movement ==
=== Transfers in/loans in ===
| No. | Name | Pos. | Transferred from | Fee/notes | Date | Ref. |
|---|---|---|---|---|---|---|
| 24 | (England) Will Swan | FW | (England) Crawley Town | Undisclosed fee; two-year contract | 28 June 2025 | |
| 11 | (England) Stephen Humphrys | FW | (England) Barnsley | Signed on a free on 20 June 2025; two-year contract | 1 July 2025 | |
| 7 | (England) Josh Neufville | DF | (England) AFC Wimbledon | Signed on a free on 11 June 2025; three-year contract | 1 July 2025 | |
| 28 | (England) Matthew Pennington | DF | (England) Blackpool | Signed on a free on 25 June 2025; two-year contract | 1 July 2025 | |
| 6 | (England) Max Power | MF | (Denmark) AGF | Signed on a free on 16 May 2025; two-year contract | 1 July 2025 | |
| 26 | (Jamaica) Curtis Tilt | DF | (England) Salford City | Signed on a free on 4 June 2025; two-year contract | 1 July 2025 | |
| 3 | (The Gambia) Ibou Touray | DF | (England) Stockport County | Signed on a free on 20 June 2025; two-year contract | 1 July 2025 | |
| 4 | (Wales) Joe Wright | DF | (Scotland) Kilmarnock | Signed on a free on 6 June 2025; two-year contract | 1 July 2025 | |
| 21 | (England) Jenson Metcalfe | MF | (England) Everton | Undisclosed fee; three-year contract | 24 July 2025 | |
| 22 | (England) Nick Powell | MF | (England) Stockport County | Signed on a free; contract details not disclosed | 18 August 2025 | |
| 14 | (Scotland) Tom McIntyre | DF | (England) Portsmouth | Season-long loan from Portsmouth; terminated on 14 January | 1 September 2025 | |
| 40 | (England) Louie Sibley | MF | (England) Oxford United | Half-season loan from Oxford United | 2 January 2026 | |
| 30 | (England) Joe White | MF | (England) Newcastle United | Half-season loan from Newcastle United | 13 January 2026 | |
| 33 | (Scotland) Harrison Ashby | DF | (England) Newcastle United | Half-season loan from Newcastle United | 13 January 2026 | |
| 14 | (England) Paul Mullin | FW | (Wales) Wrexham | Half-season loan from Wrexham | 30 January 2026 | |
| 19 | (England) Kayden Jackson | FW | (England) Derby County | Undisclosed fee; two-and-a-half-year contract | 30 January 2026 | |
| 8 | (Wales) Lee Evans | MF | (England) Blackpool | Undisclosed fee; deal until the end of the season | 2 February 2026 | |
| 27 | (England) Ethan Wheatley | FW | (England) Manchester United | Half-season loan from Manchester United | 2 February 2026 | |

=== Transfers/loans out ===
| No. | Name | Pos. | Transferred/loaned to | Fee/notes | Date | Ref. |
|---|---|---|---|---|---|---|
| 6 | (England) Richard Smallwood | MF | (England) Tranmere Rovers | Contract expired; signed with Tranmere Rovers on 14 July 2025 | 1 July 2025 | |
| 7 | (Scotland) Jamie Walker | MF | (England) Grimsby Town | Contract expired; signed with Grimsby Town on 25 June 2025 | 1 July 2025 | |
| 13 | (Republic of Ireland) Colin Doyle | GK | Retired | Continued role as goalkeeping coach | 1 July 2025 | |
| 15 | (England) Sam Stubbs | DF | (England) Shrewsbury Town | Contract expired; signed with Shrewsbury Town on 25 June 2025 | 1 July 2025 | |
| 19 | (England) Vadaine Oliver | FW | (England) Hartlepool United | Contract expired; signed with Hartlepool United on 11 September 2025 | 1 July 2025 | |
| 20 | (England) Paul Huntington | DF | Retired | Contract expired; retired | 1 July 2025 | |
| 22 | (England) Callum Johnson | DF | (England) Gateshead | Contract expired; signed with Gateshead on 7 July 2025 | 1 July 2025 | |
| 30 | (England) Romoney Crichlow | DF | (England) Barnet | Contract expired; signed with Barnet on 23 June 2025 | 1 July 2025 | |
| 39 | (England) Gabriel Wadsworth | MF | (England) Eccleshill United | Contract expired; signed with Eccleshill United on 18 August 2025 | 1 July 2025 | |
| 29 | (England) Harry Ibbitson | FW | (England) Chorley | Season-long loan to Chorley (Note: On 10 September, Ibbitson's loan at Chorley was extended for a further two months. On 19 December it was extended again by a further month. On 20 January, it was extended until the end of the season.) | 7 August 2025 | |
| 12 | (Kenya) Clarke Oduor | MF | (England) Grimsby Town | Season-long loan to Grimsby Town | 26 August 2025 | |
| 14 | (England) Tyler Smith | FW | (England) Rochdale | Contract terminated by mutual consent; signed with Rochdale on 3 October 2025 | 1 September 2025 | |
| 33 | (Kenya) Adam Wilson | FW | (Wales) The New Saints | Contract terminated by mutual consent; signed with TNS on 19 September 2025 | 1 September 2025 | |
| 35 | (Northern Ireland) George Goodman | DF | (England) Guiseley | Three-month loan to Guiseley (Note: On 18 November, Goodman's loan at Guiseley was extended by a further month. It was extended again on 19 December for a further month) | 17 October 2025 | |
| 31 | (England) Zac Hadi | GK | (England) Clitheroe | Three-month loan to Clitheroe (Note: On 19 December, Hadi's loan at Clitheroe was extended by a further month. On 6 January, Hadi's loan was extended another month.) | 7 November 2025 | |
| 16 | (England) Alex Pattison | MF | (England) Walsall | Undisclosed fee | 7 January 2026 | |
| 9 | (England) Andy Cook | FW | (England) Grimsby Town | End-of-season loan | 12 January 2026 | |
| 2 | (England) Brad Halliday | DF | (Scotland) Dundee | Contract terminated by mutual consent; signed with Dundee on 14 January 2026 | 14 January 2026 | |
| 19 | (Republic of Ireland) Lewis Richards | DF | (England) Crawley Town | Undisclosed fee | 16 January 2026 | |
| 5 | (Republic of Ireland) Neill Byrne | DF | (England) Doncaster Rovers | End-of-season loan | 26 January 2026 | |
| 8 | (Republic of Ireland) Calum Kavanagh | FW | (England) Oldham Athletic | Undisclosed fee | 1 February 2026 | |
| 20 | (England) Tommy Leigh | MF | (England) Bristol Rovers | End-of-season loan | 2 February 2026 | |

=== New contracts ===
| Date | Pos. | Player | Contract until | Ref. |
|---|---|---|---|---|
| 9 June 2025 | GK | (England) Sam Walker | 30 June 2027 | |
| 24 June 2025 | DF | (Republic of Ireland) Ciarán Kelly | 30 June 2026 | |
| 11 July 2025 | DF | (Republic of Ireland) Lewis Richards | 30 June 2026 | |
| 7 August 2025 | MF | (England) Bobby Pointon | 30 June 2027 (Note: Option of a further year) | |
| 7 November 2025 | GK | (England) Zac Hadi | 30 June 2027 | |
| 7 November 2025 | FW | (England) Harry Ibbitson | 30 June 2027 | |
