= Tyreik Wright =

Irish footballer (born 2001)

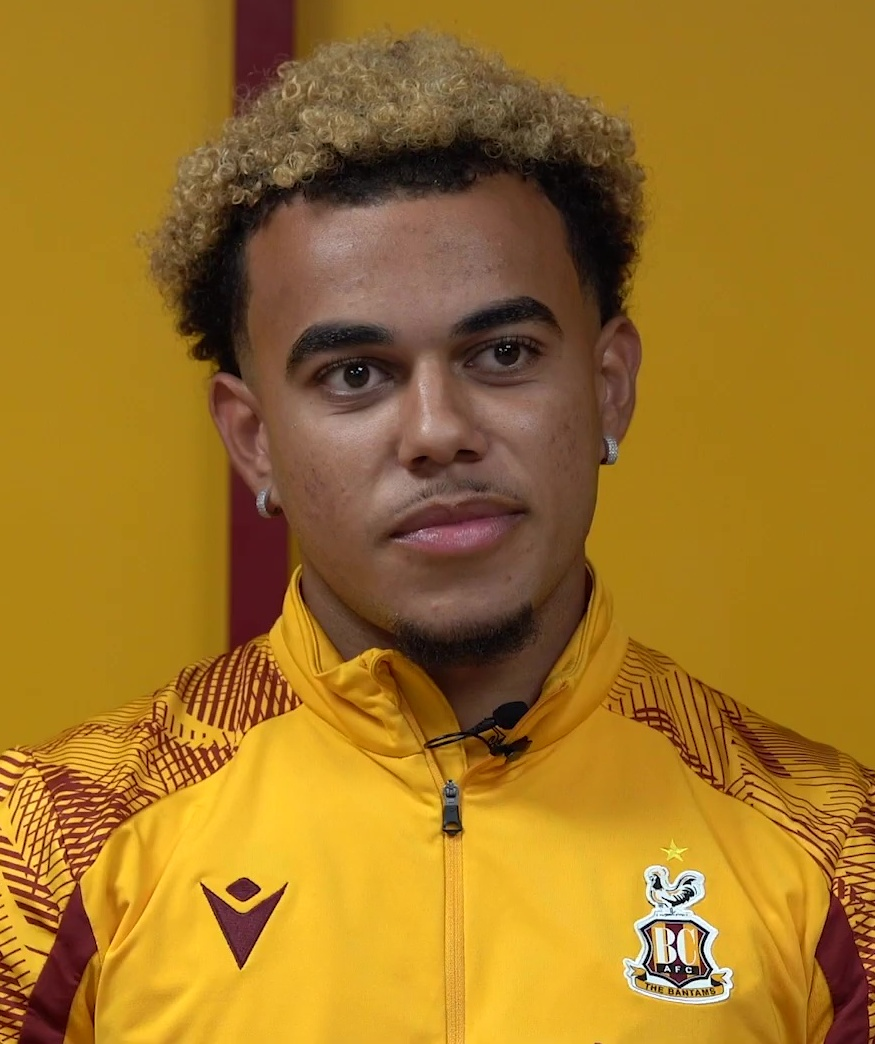
- Wright with Bradford City in 2022

Personal information
- Full name: Tyreik Samuel Wright
- Date of birth: 22 September 2001 (age 25)
- Place of birth: Ovens, County Cork, Ireland
- Height: 1.79 m (5 ft 10 in)
- Positions: Winger; wing back

Team information
- Current team: Bradford City
- Number: 17

Youth career
- 2006–2018: Lakewood Athletic
- 2018–2021: Aston Villa

Senior career*
Years	Team	Apps	(Gls)
2021–2023	Aston Villa	0	(0)
2021	→ Walsall (loan)	16	(0)
2021–2022	→ Salford City (loan)	16	(1)
2022	→ Colchester United (loan)	9	(1)
2022–2023	→ Bradford City (loan)	15	(4)
2023–2024	Plymouth Argyle	11	(0)
2024	→ Bradford City (loan)	14	(2)
2024–	Bradford City	63	(4)

International career^{‡}
- Republic of Ireland U17
- Republic of Ireland U18
- Republic of Ireland U19
2021–2022	Republic of Ireland U21	15	(3)
- * Club domestic league appearances and goals as of 16:19, 8 August 2026 (UTC) ‡ National team caps and goals as of 23:18, 27 September 2022 (UTC)

Tyreik Samuel Wright (born 22 September 2001) is an Irish professional footballer who plays as a winger and wing back for EFL League One club Bradford City.

Wright is a product of the Aston Villa Academy, having signed as a junior from Irish youth side Lakewood Athletic. He has played on loan at League Two sides Walsall, Salford City, Colchester United and Bradford City and has represented the Republic of Ireland at youth levels up to under-21.

== Club career ==
=== Aston Villa ===
Wright is from Ovens, County Cork and began his career with local club Lakewood at the age of five, before signing for English club Aston Villa in July 2018.

He moved on loan to Walsall on 13 January 2021. On 23 January, Wright made his professional debut in a 3–1 away league victory against Port Vale.

On 6 July 2021, Wright was amongst several Academy players who were given new professional contracts, and on 17 August, Wright joined Salford City in League Two on a season-long loan. He made his Salford City debut the same day, as a substitute in a 2–1 defeat to Crawley Town. On 28 August, he scored his first professional goal in Salford's 3–0 home win against Newport County, opening the scoring in the first minute of his side's first win of the season. He was recalled from his loan on 14 January 2022.

On 31 January 2022, he moved on loan to Colchester United. He made his Colchester United debut on 5 February, in a 1–0 away victory over Leyton Orient. On 12 February, Wright scored his first goal for Colchester, in a 2–2 League Two draw against Carlisle United.

On 1 September 2022, Wright returned to League Two when he joined Bradford City on loan until the end of the 2022–23 season. After two substitute appearances, he made his full debut on 17 September, scoring one goal and setting up another in a man-of-the-match display. In October 2022 local media said that his "form continues to impress".

=== Plymouth Argyle ===
On 9 January 2023, Aston Villa recalled Wright from his Bradford City loan. Later that day he signed for Plymouth Argyle.

In January 2024 he returned on loan to Bradford City. His versatility was welcomed by Bradford manager Graham Alexander, whilst Wright said he was looking forward to loving football again, and that he wanted to score a goal in front of the Valley Parade Kop. He suffered an injury in his first match back for the club, lasting 60 minutes. He scored his first goals for the club following his return on 9 March 2024, two goals in a 3–0 away victory at Accrington. However, he was injured again in that match.

Towards the end of the season, Alexander suggested that they would try and keep Wright, whilst Wright himself said he did not know what next season would bring. After the end of his loan, Bradford City said they wanted to bring him on loan back for the 2024–25 season.

=== Permanent return to Bradford City ===
Wright returned to Bradford City in July 2024, signing a two-year contract for an undisclosed fee. He said that he was "absolutely buzzing" about the transfer. After training he did play in the opening pre-season match on account of fitness, but made his debut in a behind-closed-doors friendly a few days later, playing 45 minutes. Wright later described the pre-season as the most difficult of his career.

In November 2024, Wright was ruled out until the new year following a quad injury. In December 2024, his rehabilitation was reported as being ahead of schedule, and he returned to training later that month.

Wright broke his nose in a match in February 2025, returning to play in March 2025 by wearing a protective face mask. He was injured in pre-season ahead of the 2025–26 season, but made a surprise return to play on the opening day of the season, as a late substitute. He said he was looking forward to playing in League One again following the club's promotion, and later spoke positively about manager Graham Alexander's team choices.

He scored his first goal for the club since re-signing on 11 November 2025, the opening goal in an eventual 3–1 defeat at Doncaster Rovers in the EFL Trophy. On 24 February 2026 he made his 100th appearance for Bradford City, and said he wanted to extend his contract with the club. In March 2026, he scored 3 goals in 4 matches, but was rested over Easter weekend as he suffered a minor injury in training. It was not clear if he would return before the end of the season, although returned to training before the end of the season, before briefly returning to the first-team for the play-offs.

He won 'goal of the season' at the 2025–26 awards. At the end of the 2025–26 season, the club triggered a clause in his contract to extend his deal for a further year.

Ahead of the 2026–27 season, Alexander said that Wright would benefit from the summer break to regain fitness, and Wright spoke positively about the club's fans. Wright suffered an injury at the start of the season, which was later revealed to be more serious than thought, with Wright being potentially ruled out for a number of months. However, in September, Alexander said that Wright was expected to return in early October. However, later that month he suffered a "setback" in his recovery, and was ruled out until 2027.

== International career ==
He has played for the Republic of Ireland at under-17, under-18 and under-19 youth levels. He made his Republic of Ireland under-21 debut in a 2–1 win over Wales under-21 in March 2021. On 3 September 2021, Wright scored his first goal for Ireland under-21 in a 2023 UEFA European Under-21 Championship qualification match against Bosnia and Herzegovina.

He was recalled to the under-21 squad in September 2022, meaning he would miss one Bradford City game. He said he hoped to regain his club first-team place upon his return, after scoring one goal and setting up another in a man-of-the-match display. Wright missed a penalty as Ireland under-21s lost on penalties to Israel in the European Championship qualifying play-offs.

== Playing style ==
Wright is known for his pace. His manager at Bradford, Mark Hughes, praised Wright for having "good awareness", noting that he is "calm in possession and keeps the ball". His later manager at Bradford, Graham Alexander, said that Wright would primarily play as a wing back for him, rather than his earlier position as a winger. By February 2025, Wright was said to be growing in confidence as a wing back, and by June 2026, Alexander praised Wright's adaptation to the position.

In March 2026, Wright noted that he did not score as many goals as he would like, but that the goals he did score were high calibre. That same month he scored 3 goals in 4 matches.

== Personal life ==
Wright has also played Gaelic football.

Wright is a Manchester United fan.

On 24 February 2021, Wright's loan club Walsall and parent club Aston Villa released joint statements condemning racist abuse that he had received on Instagram. The messages were reported to both the social media platform and West Midlands Police's Hate Crime Unit for investigation. On 27 September 2021, police charged a 17-year-old from the North East with sending the abusive messages under the Communications Act 2003.

== Career statistics ==
As of match played 8 May 2026

Appearances and goals by club, season and competition
Club	Season	League			FA Cup		League Cup		Other		Total	
Club	Season	Division	Apps	Goals	Apps	Goals	Apps	Goals	Apps	Goals	Apps	Goals
Aston Villa U21	2019–20	—	—		—		—		2 (Note: Appearance(s) in EFL Trophy)	0	2	0
Aston Villa U21	2020–21	—	—		—		—		3	0	3	0
Aston Villa U21	Total		—		—		—		5	0	5	0
Aston Villa	2020–21	Premier League	0	0	0	0	0	0	—		0	0
Aston Villa	2021–22	Premier League	0	0	0	0	0	0	—		0	0
Aston Villa	2022–23	Premier League	0	0	0	0	0	0	—		0	0
Aston Villa	Total		0	0	0	0	0	0	0	0	0	0
Walsall (loan)	2020–21	League Two	16	0	—		—		—		16	0
Salford City (loan)	2021–22	League Two	16	1	1	0	—		1	0	18	1
Colchester United (loan)	2021–22	League Two	9	1	—		—		—		9	1
Bradford City (loan)	2022–23	League Two	15	4	1	0	0	0	1	0	17	4
Plymouth Argyle	2022–23	League One	6	0	0	0	0	0	0	0	6	0
Plymouth Argyle	2023–24	Championship	5	0	0	0	2	0	0	0	7	0
Plymouth Argyle	Total		11	0	0	0	2	0	0	0	13	0
Bradford City (loan)	2023–24	League Two	14	2	0	0	0	0	1	0	15	2
Bradford City	2024–25	League Two	28	0	0	0	0	0	4	0	32	0
Bradford City	2025–26	League One	35	4	1	0	3	0	5 (Note: Three appearances and one goal in the EFL Trophy, two appearances in the play-offs)	1	44	5
Bradford City	2026–27	League One	0	0	0	0	1	0	0	0	1	0
Bradford City	Total		63	4	1	0	4	0	9	1	77	5
Career total			144	12	3	0	6	0	17	1	170	13

== Honours ==
Plymouth Argyle

- EFL League One: 2022–23
