= Neill Byrne =

Irish footballer (born 1993)

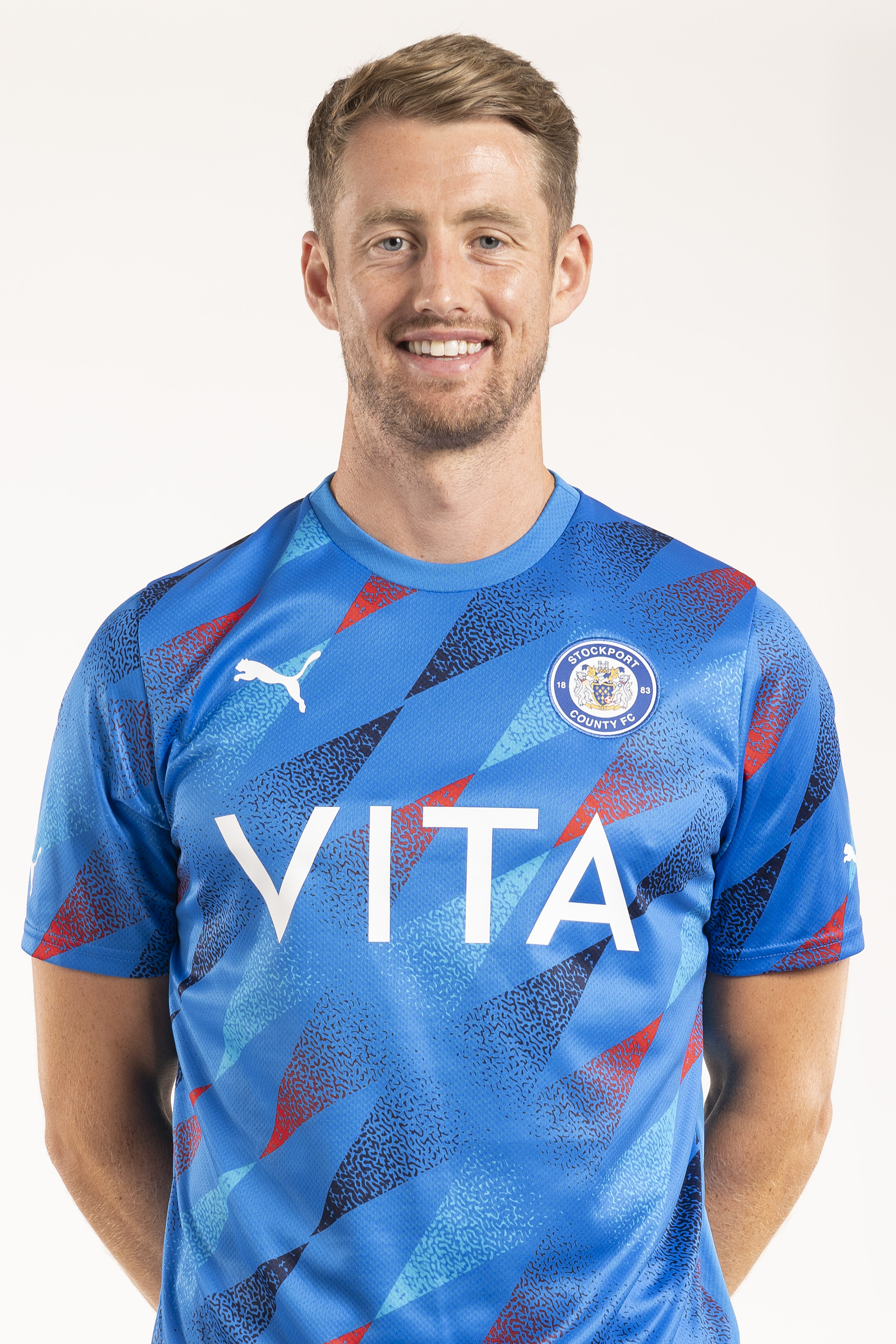
- Byrne during his time at Stockport County F.C.

Personal information
- Full name: Neill Byrne
- Date of birth: 2 February 1993 (age 33)
- Place of birth: Portmarnock, Ireland
- Height: 1.90 m (6 ft 3 in)
- Position: Centre-back

Team information
- Current team: Doncaster Rovers
- Number: 12

Youth career
- Belvedere
- 2007–2011: Nottingham Forest

Senior career*
Years	Team	Apps	(Gls)
2011	Nottingham Forest	0	(0)
2012–2013	Rochdale	3	(0)
2012	→ Barrow (loan)	1	(0)
2013	→ Southport (loan)	10	(2)
2013–2015	AFC Telford United	78	(6)
2015–2017	Macclesfield Town	59	(4)
2017–2018	Gateshead	39	(1)
2018–2020	AFC Fylde	81	(4)
2020–2021	FC Halifax Town	40	(1)
2021–2022	Hartlepool United	40	(1)
2022–2023	Tranmere Rovers	13	(0)
2023–2024	Stockport County	35	(1)
2024–2026	Bradford City	35	(3)
2026–	Doncaster Rovers	27	(0)

International career
2011–2012	Republic of Ireland U19	4	(0)
- * Club domestic league appearances and goals as of 23 October 2026 (UTC)

Neill Byrne (born 2 February 1993) is an Irish professional footballer who plays as a centre-back for EFL League One club Doncaster Rovers.

== Career ==
=== Early career ===
Byrne was born in Portmarnock, Ireland. He started his career with Irish sides Portmarnock and Belvedere before joining the Nottingham Forest Youth Academy at the age of 14. Despite interest from other clubs, two years later he signed apprentice terms with the club until 2011. Byrne was released by Forest in December 2011 and joined Rochdale on trial, scoring in a reserve game against Manchester City. After impressing on trial, Byrne signed an 18-month contract with the League One club on 1 January 2012. He made his debut for the Dale on 31 March 2012, in a 3–3 draw with relegation rivals Walsall. In November 2012, he joined Football Conference side Barrow on a one-month loan deal.

=== AFC Telford United ===
He joined AFC Telford United in June 2013 after being released by Rochdale. On 26 April 2014, he won promotion to the Conference Premier with Telford after they clinched the Conference North title on the final game of the season.

=== Macclesfield Town ===
After his impressive season with Telford, he signed for Macclesfield Town. During his 2-year spell, he made 59 National League appearances and 3 FA Cup appearances. He scored 4 goals in the National League and started the majority of games, helping Macclesfield to 10th in the 2015–16 season. In the 2016–17 season, Macclesfield finished 9th in the National League. They also reached the final of the FA Trophy in 2016–17, however they lost 3–2 against York City.

=== Gateshead ===
Byrne agreed to join Gateshead on 26 May 2017 until the end of the season. He made his debut on the opening day of the season in a 1–2 defeat against Woking, scoring his first, and only, goal for the club three days later in a 1–0 victory over Guiseley.

=== AFC Fylde ===
In May 2018, Byrne signed for AFC Fylde on a two-year deal. In his first year, he played 44 games in the National League and scored 2 goals as Fylde finished fifth in the table. In the play-offs, Fylde reached the final, but lost 3–0 to Salford City. Byrne also managed to help Fylde reach the final of the FA Trophy, while he did start the final, he was substituted off due to a head injury. Fylde won 1–0 against Leyton Orient.

In Byrne's second season for Fylde, he played 37 games in the National League and scored 2 goals. Unfortunately, his contributions were not enough, as Fylde were relegated after finishing in 23rd. Fylde managed to reach the third round of the FA Cup, before losing 2–1 to, then, Premier League side, Sheffield United.

=== FC Halifax Town ===
On 23 September 2020, Byrne signed for National League side FC Halifax Town. In Byrne's first, and only, year at Halifax, he played 40 games and scored 1 goal in the National League. Halifax finished the season in tenth position.

=== Hartlepool United ===
On 16 July 2021, Byrne signed for Hartlepool United for an undisclosed fee. Byrne made his Hartlepool debut in a 1–0 victory against Crawley Town. In 2021–22, Byrne played 51 times for Hartlepool, scoring once.

=== Tranmere Rovers ===
In July 2022, Byrne signed for League Two club Tranmere Rovers for an undisclosed fee.

=== Stockport County ===
On 6 January 2023, Byrne signed for League Two rivals Stockport County for an undisclosed fee on a deal until the end of the season. The move would see Byrne play under manager Dave Challinor for a third time having also worked with him at AFC Fylde and Hartlepool United. He was a member of the Stockport side that won the League Two title in 2023–24, making 22 appearances throughout the season.

=== Bradford City ===
On 20 May 2024, Byrne signed for League Two club Bradford City on a two-year deal for an undisclosed fee. On 26 January 2026, Byrne joined League One club Doncaster Rovers on loan until the end of the season.

Byrne departed Bradford upon the expiry of his contract at the end of the 2025–26 season.

Doncaster Rovers

On 9 June 2026, Byrne signed for League One club Doncaster Rovers on a two-year deal.

== Career statistics ==
As of match played 6 April 2026

Appearances and goals by club, season and competition
Club	Season	League			FA Cup		League Cup		Other		Total	
Club	Season	Division	Apps	Goals	Apps	Goals	Apps	Goals	Apps	Goals	Apps	Goals
Rochdale	2011–12	League One	3	0	—		0	0	0	0	3	0
Rochdale	2012–13	League Two	0	0	1	0	0	0	0	0	1	0
Rochdale	Total		3	0	1	0	0	0	0	0	4	0
Barrow (loan)	2012–13	Conference Premier	1	0	—		—		0	0	1	0
Southport (loan)	2012–13	Conference Premier	10	2	—		—		0	0	10	2
AFC Telford United	2013–14	Conference North	40	2	0	0	—		2 (Note: Appearances in FA Trophy)	0	42	2
AFC Telford United	2014–15	Conference Premier	38	4	1	0	—		2	0	43	4
AFC Telford United	Total		78	6	1	0	0	0	4	0	85	6
Macclesfield Town	2015–16	National League	27	2	1	0	—		4	1	32	3
Macclesfield Town	2016–17	National League	32	2	2	0	—		9	0	44	2
Macclesfield Town	Total		60	4	3	0	0	0	13	1	76	5
Gateshead	2017–18	National League	39	1	2	0	—		0	0	41	1
AFC Fylde	2018–19	National League	44	2	—		—		3	0	47	2
AFC Fylde	2019–20	National League	37	2	3	0	—		4	1	44	3
AFC Fylde	Total		81	4	3	0	0	0	7	1	91	5
Halifax Town	2020–21	National League	40	1	—		—		2	0	42	1
Hartlepool United	2021–22	League Two	40	1	5	0	1	0	5	0	51	1
Tranmere Rovers	2022–23	League Two	13	0	1	1	2	0	3	1	19	2
Stockport County	2022–23	League Two	19	0	0	0	0	0	2	0	21	0
Stockport County	2023–24	League Two	16	1	3	1	0	0	3	0	22	2
Stockport County	Total		35	1	3	1	0	0	5	0	43	2
Bradford City	2024–25	League Two	27	2	2	0	1	0	4	0	34	2
Bradford City	2025–26	League One	8	1	1	0	1	0	3	0	13	1
Bradford City	Total		35	3	3	0	2	0	7	0	47	3
Doncaster Rovers	2025–26	League One	14	0	0	0	0	0	0	0	14	0
Doncaster Rovers	2026–27	League One	13	0	0	0	0	0	1	0	0	0
Career total			449	23	24	2	5	0	46	3	524	28

== Honours ==
Macclesfield Town

- FA Trophy runner-up: 2016–17

AFC Fylde

- FA Trophy: 2018–19

Stockport County

- EFL League Two: 2023–24
