= Sam Corne =

English footballer (born 1996)

Personal information
- Full name: Samuel Louis Corne
- Date of birth: 11 July 1996 (age 30)
- Height: 5 ft 10 in (1.78 m)
- Position: Midfielder

Team information
- Current team: Maidstone United
- Number: 8

Senior career*
Years	Team	Apps	(Gls)
2013–2016	Welling United	64	(5)
2016–2017	Braintree Town	26	(3)
2017–2018	Greenwich Borough		
2018–2019	Ashford United	40	(21)
2019–	Maidstone United	115	(19)
Total		245	(48)
- * Club domestic league appearances and goals

Samuel Louis Corne (born 11 July 1996) is an English footballer who plays as a midfielder for National League South club Maidstone United.

== Club career ==
Corne started his career at Welling United in 2013, and moved to Braintree in 2016. After a season, he moved to Greenwich Borough, and then on to Ashford United, where he scored 21 goals in 40 games.

In July 2019 he joined National League club Maidstone United on a free transfer. He was a member of the Maidstone side which gained promotion back to the National League at the end of the 2021–22 season, though The Stones would drop back down at the end of the following campaign.

During the 2023–24 season, Corne played a key part in Maidstone United's FA Cup run to the fifth round, which included wins against League opposition in Barrow and Stevenage. Corne scored the winning goal in Maidstone's 2–1 victory over Ipswich Town at Portman Road, meaning the club were the first from outside the top five divisions to reach the fifth round since Blyth Spartans in 1977–78. Maidstone lost their fifth round tie 5–0 away to Coventry City.
