= William Osula =

Danish footballer (born 2003)

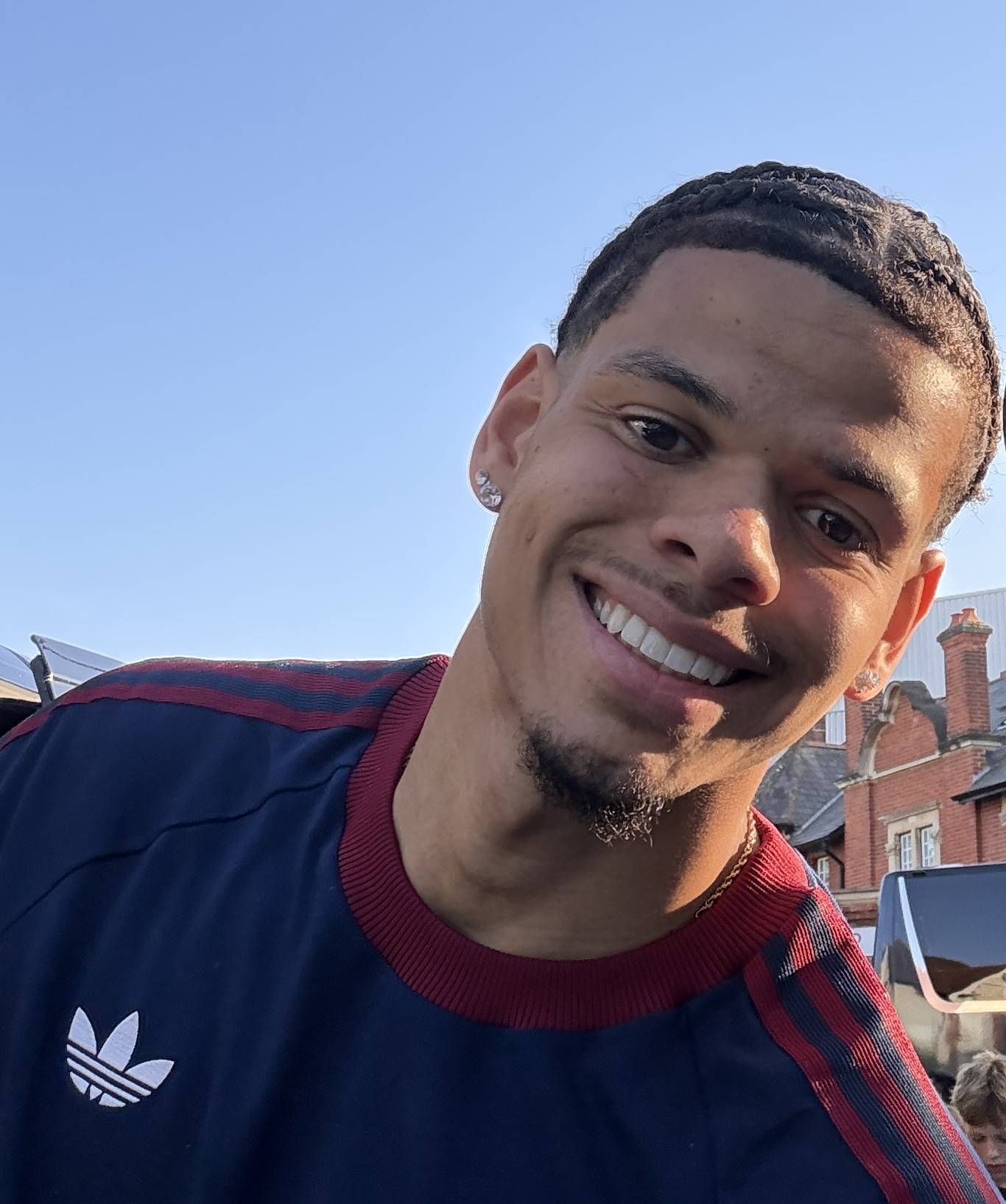
- Osula with Newcastle United in 2026

Personal information
- Full name: William Idemudia Daugaard Osula
- Date of birth: 4 August 2003 (age 23)
- Place of birth: Copenhagen, Denmark
- Height: 1.93 m (6 ft 4 in)
- Position: Striker

Team information
- Current team: Newcastle United
- Number: 10

Youth career
- Copenhagen
- 2018–2022: Sheffield United

Senior career*
Years	Team	Apps	(Gls)
2022–2024	Sheffield United	28	(0)
2022–2023	→ Derby County (loan)	16	(2)
2024–	Newcastle United	42	(9)

International career^{‡}
2022	Denmark U19	1	(0)
2023–2025	Denmark U21	15	(8)
2026–	Denmark	4	(0)
- * Club domestic league appearances and goals as of 01:16, 26 October 2026 (UTC) ‡ National team caps and goals as of 22:10, 17 November 2026 (UTC)

William Idemudia Daugaard Osula (/oʊˈsuːlə/; Danish pronunciation: [ˈvil.jæm oˈsuː.lɑ]; born 4 August 2003) is a Danish professional footballer who plays as a striker for Premier League club Newcastle United and the Denmark national team.

== Club career ==
=== Sheffield United ===
Osula is a youth product of Danish club Copenhagen, where he played before moving to the youth academy of Sheffield United in 2018. On 13 July 2021, he signed his first professional contract with the Yorkshire club. He made his first team debut in a 0–0 draw against Blackpool on 16 March 2022, coming on as a late substitute in the 91st minute.

==== Loan to Derby County ====
On 1 September 2022, Osula joined Derby County on a season-long loan. On 15 October 2022, having already appeared four times from the bench, Osula made his first start for the club, scoring two goals in a 3–0 victory against Accrington Stanley.

==== Return from loan ====
On 6 January 2024, Osula scored a brace for Sheffield United in a 4–0 FA Cup victory over Gillingham, marking his first senior goals for the club.

=== Newcastle United ===
On 8 August 2024, Newcastle United announced the signing of Osula for £10,000,000 with a further £5,000,000 in add-ons. He made his debut for the club as a substitute in a 3–1 loss to Fulham on 21 September.

On 12 January 2025, Osula scored his first goal for the club in the third round of the FA Cup, the third of a 3–1 win over Bromley. On 26 April 2025, he scored his first Premier League goal in a 3–0 win over Ipswich Town, heading in from a Kieran Trippier corner.

Osula began the 2025–26 season by scoring an 88th-minute equaliser for Newcastle in their first Premier League home fixture against league champions Liverpool. The Magpies went on to lose 3–2, with Liverpool scoring a winning goal in the tenth minute of stoppage time.

On 4 March 2026, he scored a 90th-minute winning goal in Newcastle's 2–1 home victory against Manchester United. The goal then earned him the Premier League Goal of the Month award.

== International career ==
Osula was born in Aarhus, Denmark to a Danish mother and a Nigerian-French father and moved to England at a young age. Osula is eligible to play for Denmark, England, France and Nigeria. He also holds both British and French nationalities. He was called up to a training camp for the Denmark U19s in February 2022. He debuted with the Denmark U19s in a friendly 3–2 loss to the Hungary U19s on 23 February 2022.

In November 2025, he was called up to the Danish national team for the World Cup qualification matches against Scotland and Belarus, but an injury forced him to withdraw. He was replaced by Yussuf Poulsen.

== Career statistics ==
=== Club ===
As of match played 25 October 2026

Appearances and goals by club, season and competition
Club	Season	League			FA Cup		EFL Cup		Europe		Other		Total	
Club	Season	Division	Apps	Goals	Apps	Goals	Apps	Goals	Apps	Goals	Apps	Goals	Apps	Goals
Sheffield United	2021–22	Championship	5	0	0	0	0	0	—		0	0	5	0
Sheffield United	2022–23	Championship	2	0	—		0	0	—		—		2	0
Sheffield United	2023–24	Premier League	21	0	2	3	1	0	–		—		24	3
Sheffield United	Total		28	0	2	3	1	0	—		0	0	31	3
Derby County (loan)	2022–23	League One	16	2	3	3	1	0	—		1 (Note: Appearance in EFL Trophy)	0	21	5
Newcastle United	2024–25	Premier League	14	1	2	1	3	0	—		—		19	2
Newcastle United	2025–26	Premier League	24	7	2	0	3	2	6 (Note: Appearances in UEFA Champions League)	0	—		35	9
Newcastle United	2026–27	Premier League	4	1	0	0	0	0	—		—		4	1
Newcastle United	Total		42	9	4	1	6	2	6	0	—		58	12
Career total			86	11	9	7	9	2	6	0	1	0	110	20

=== International ===
As of match played 17 November 2026

Appearances and goals by national team and year
National team	Year	Apps	Goals
Denmark	2026	4	0
Total		4	0

== Honours ==
Newcastle United

- EFL Cup: 2024–25

Individual

- Premier League Goal of the Month: March 2026
- BBC Goal of the Month: March 2026
