= Adam Wilson =

Adam Wilson may refer to:

- Sir Adam Wilson (judge) (1814–1891), Canadian lawyer, judge, political figure and former mayor of Toronto
- Adam Wilson (musician), British bass player for Thirteen Senses
- Adam Wilson (footballer) (born 2000), English footballer for Bradford City and Kenya
- Adam Wilson (The Young and the Restless), fictional character from The Young and the Restless
