= Calum Kavanagh =

Irish footballer (born 2003)

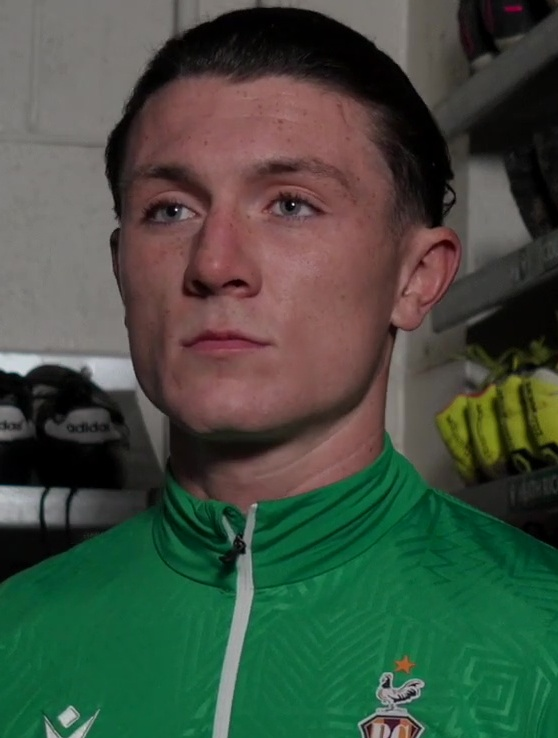
- Kavanagh with Bradford City in 2024

Personal information
- Full name: Calum Graham Kavanagh
- Date of birth: 5 September 2003 (age 23)
- Place of birth: Cardiff, Wales
- Height: 1.83 m (6 ft 0 in)
- Position: Forward

Team information
- Current team: Oldham Athletic

Youth career
- –2022: Middlesbrough

Senior career*
Years	Team	Apps	(Gls)
2022–2024	Middlesbrough	2	(0)
2022	→ Harrogate Town (loan)	12	(1)
2023	→ Newport County (loan)	19	(2)
2024–2026	Bradford City	61	(14)
2026–	Oldham Athletic	6	(1)

International career^{‡}
2019–2020	Republic of Ireland U17	4	(1)
2024	Republic of Ireland U21	1	(0)
- * Club domestic league appearances and goals as of 18:55, 1 February 2026 (UTC) ‡ National team caps and goals as of 14:13, 25 September 2025 (UTC)

Calum Graham Kavanagh (born 5 September 2003) is a professional footballer who plays as a forward for EFL League Two club Oldham Athletic. Born in Wales, he has represented the Republic of Ireland internationally at under-17 and under-21 level.

== Early and personal life ==
Kavanagh is the son of former professional footballer Graham Kavanagh, who played internationally for the Republic of Ireland. He was born in Cardiff, whilst his father was playing for Cardiff City and grew up in England once his father returned there after leaving Cardiff City.

== Club career ==
After coming through Middlesbrough's academy, he made his debut for the club's under-18 side during the 2019–20 season and, after a string of impressive performances, was linked with a potential transfer to Premier League clubs Arsenal and Chelsea. He signed a scholarship deal with the club in summer 2020, before signing a three-year professional contract in September 2020.

On 28 January 2022, it was announced that Kavanagh had joined EFL League Two club Harrogate Town on loan until the end of the season. On 19 March 2022, he scored his first goal for the club on his seventh appearance.

On 31 January 2023, Kavanagh joined Newport County on loan for the remainder of the 2022–23 season. He made his Newport debut in a 2–1 win against Swindon Town on 4 February 2023 as a second-half substitute, scoring the second Newport goal.

Kavanagh's Middlesbrough debut came on 19 December 2023 in a 0–3 away win over Port Vale in the quarter-final of the EFL Cup, where he was substituted on in the 73rd minute. On 26 December 2023, he came on as a substitute in a 1–0 away loss to Rotherham United to make his league debut. His home debut came in a 3–1 loss to Coventry City on 1 January 2024.

On 1 February 2024, Kavanagh signed for League Two club Bradford City for an undisclosed fee on a two-and-a-half-year deal.

On 1 February 2026, Kavanagh returned to League Two, joining Oldham Athletic on a two-and-a-half year deal.

== International career ==
Kavanagh made four appearances for the Republic of Ireland national under-17 team, scoring one goal. He made his debut for the Republic of Ireland U21 side on 7 June 2024, in a 3–2 win away to Croatia U21 in a friendly.

== Career statistics ==
As of match played 27 January 2026

Appearances and goals by club, season and competition
Club	Season	League			FA Cup		EFL Cup		Other		Total	
Club	Season	Division	Apps	Goals	Apps	Goals	Apps	Goals	Apps	Goals	Apps	Goals
Middlesbrough	2021–22	Championship	0	0	0	0	0	0	—		0	0
Middlesbrough	2022–23	Championship	0	0	0	0	0	0	0	0	0	0
Middlesbrough	2023–24	Championship	2	0	0	0	1	0	—		3	0
Middlesbrough	Total		2	0	0	0	1	0	0	0	3	0
Harrogate Town (loan)	2021–22	League Two	12	1	0	0	0	0	0	0	12	1
Newport County (loan)	2022–23	League Two	19	2	0	0	0	0	0	0	19	2
Bradford City	2023–24	League Two	15	5	0	0	0	0	1 (Note: Appearance(s) in EFL Trophy)	0	16	5
Bradford City	2024–25	League Two	38	9	2	1	1	0	4	3	45	13
Bradford City	2025–26	League One	8	0	0	0	0	0	1	1	9	1
Bradford City	Total		61	14	2	1	1	0	6	4	70	19
Career total			94	17	2	1	2	0	6	4	104	22
