= Tayo Adaramola =

Irish footballer (born 2004)

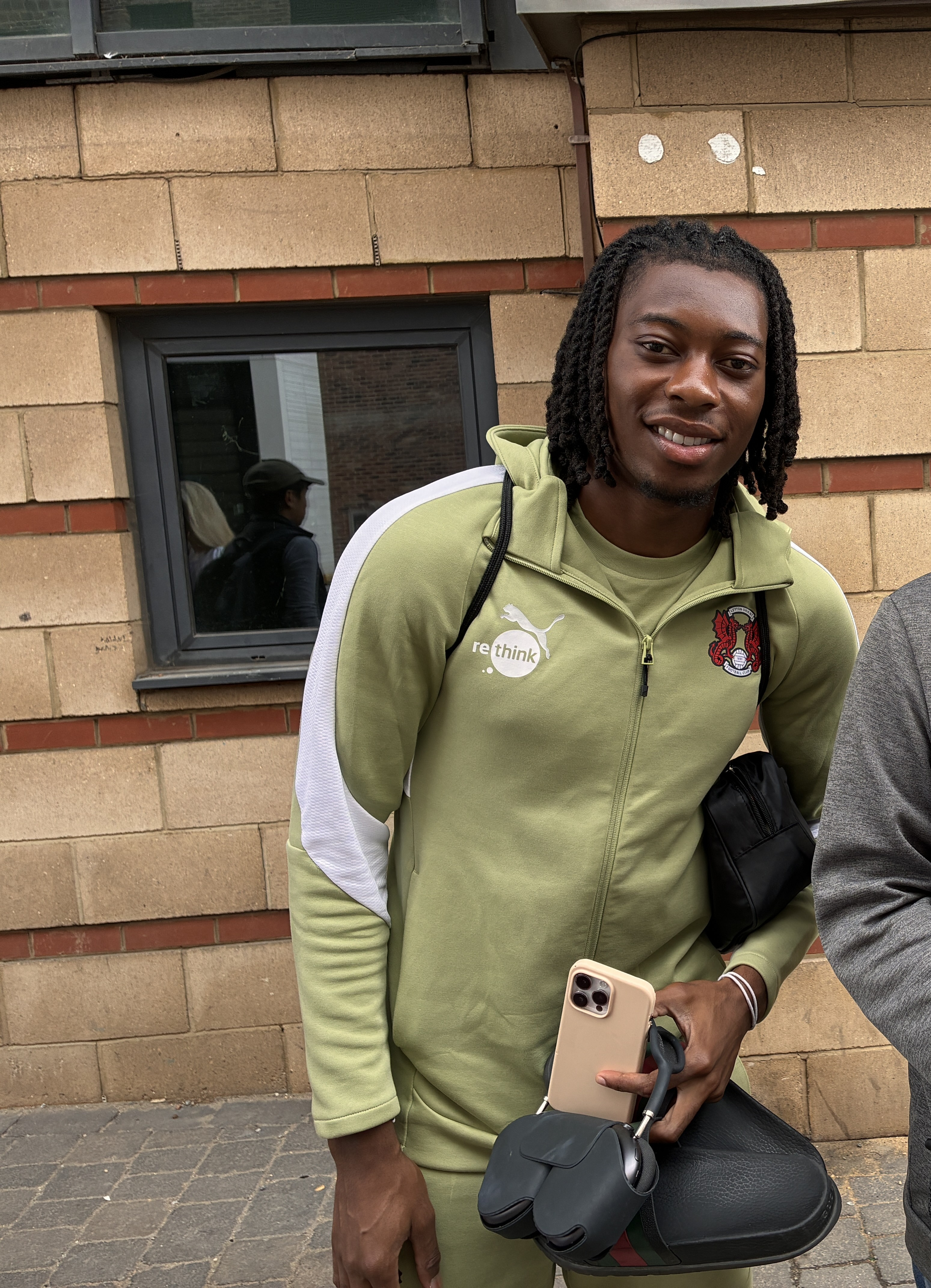
- Adaramola in 2025

Personal information
- Full name: Omotayo Daniel Adaramola
- Date of birth: 14 November 2003 (age 23)
- Place of birth: Dublin, Ireland
- Height: 1.77 m (5 ft 10 in)
- Positions: Left-back; left wing-back

Team information
- Current team: Cercle Brugge
- Number: 45

Youth career
- –2012: St Mochta's
- 2012–2015: St Kevin's Boys
- 2015–2022: Crystal Palace

Senior career*
Years	Team	Apps	(Gls)
2022–2026	Crystal Palace	0	(0)
2022	→ Coventry City (loan)	0	(0)
2024	→ RWD Molenbeek (loan)	14	(0)
2024–2025	→ Stockport County (loan)	6	(0)
2025	→ Bradford City (loan)	16	(0)
2025–2026	→ Leyton Orient (loan)	15	(0)
2026	→ Sheffield Wednesday (loan)	16	(0)
2026–	Cercle Brugge	1	(0)

International career^{‡}
2019	Republic of Ireland U17	3	(0)
2021–2022	Republic of Ireland U19	6	(0)
2022–2024	Republic of Ireland U21	6	(0)
2026–	Republic of Ireland	1	(0)
- * Club domestic league appearances and goals as of 14:07, 27 September 2026 (UTC) ‡ National team caps and goals as of 18:32, 16 May 2026 (UTC)

Omotayo Daniel "Tayo" Adaramola (born 14 November 2003) is an Irish footballer who plays as a left-back or left wing-back for Belgian Pro League club Cercle Brugge and the Republic of Ireland national team.

== Early life ==
Originally from Dublin, Adaramola was born to Yoruba Nigerian parents on 14 November 2003. He made his start in football at his local Dublin club St Mochta's before moving onto St. Kevin's Boys aged nine. He later joined the Crystal Palace academy at the under-12 level after moving with his family to London to improve his chances of becoming a professional footballer. Before signing with Palace, Adaramola also had trials with Charlton Athletic and West Ham United.

== Club career ==
=== Crystal Palace ===
Adaramola signed his first professional contract with Crystal Palace in 2020, going on to play for the club's under-18 and under-23 sides throughout the 2020–21 season. In February 2022, Adaramola made his senior debut for Palace, coming on as a substitute in the second half of an FA Cup win over Hartlepool United. He made his first start for the club against Stoke City in the fifth round of the FA Cup on 1 March 2022.

==== Coventry City loan ====
After playing with the Crystal Palace first team squad during a pre-season tour of Singapore and Australia during the summer of 2022, Adaramola completed a loan move to Coventry City of the EFL Championship for the 2022–23 season, but returned to Crystal Palace on 2 September after only making one appearance in the EFL Cup .

==== RWD Molenbeek loan ====
In January 2024, Adaramola joined Belgian club RWD Molenbeek on loan until the end of the season.

==== Stockport County loan ====
On 26 July 2024, Adaramola joined League One club Stockport County on a season-long loan deal. However the loan was cut short in January 2025.

==== Bradford City loan ====
On 3 February 2025, Adaramola signed for EFL League Two club Bradford City on loan until the end of the season. Adaramola helped Bradford get promoted as they finished 3rd that season.

==== Leyton Orient loan ====
On 26 July 2025, Adaramola was loaned out to EFL League One club Leyton Orient. His loan deal was ended by Leyton Orient on 5 January 2026 having played 19 times.

==== Sheffield Wednesday loan ====
On 1 February 2026, Adaramola joined Championship side Sheffield Wednesday on loan for the remainder of the season. He made his Sheffield Wednesday debut starting in the 0–4 defeat to Swansea City on 8 February 2026.

=== Cercle Brugge ===
On 17 August 2026, Adaramola joined Belgian Pro League club Cercle Brugge on a permanent basis on a long-term contract.

== International career ==
Eligible to play for the Republic of Ireland and Nigeria, Adaramola was first called up to the Republic of Ireland U17s in 2019. He made his debut for the Republic of Ireland U19s in a friendly match against the Sweden U19s on 8 October 2021. In May 2022, he received his first Under-21 call-up. On 6 June 2022, Adaramola made his debut for the Republic of Ireland U21 team in a 3–1 win over Montenegro U21 at Tallaght Stadium.

On 5 May 2026, Adaramola was called up to the Republic of Ireland senior team for a friendly against Grenada in Murcia, Spain. On 16 May 2026, he made his senior Republic of Ireland debut, starting in a 5–0 win over Grenada.

== Career statistics ==
=== Club ===
As of 23 August 2026

Appearances and goals by club, season and competition
Club	Season	League			National Cup (Note: Includes FA Cup & Belgian Cup)		League Cup (Note: Includes EFL Cup)		Other		Total	
Club	Season	Division	Apps	Goals	Apps	Goals	Apps	Goals	Apps	Goals	Apps	Goals
Crystal Palace	2021–22	Premier League	0	0	2	0	0	0	—		2	0
Crystal Palace	2022–23	Premier League	0	0	0	0	—		—		0	0
Crystal Palace	2023–24	Premier League	0	0	0	0	0	0	—		0	0
Crystal Palace	2024–25	Premier League	0	0	—		—		—		0	0
Crystal Palace	2025–26	Premier League	0	0	—		—		—		0	0
Crystal Palace	Total		0	0	2	0	0	0	—		2	0
Coventry City (loan)	2022–23	Championship	0	0	—		1	0	—		1	0
RWD Molenbeek (loan)	2023–24	Belgian Pro League	14	0	—		—		0	0	14	0
Stockport County (loan)	2024–25	League One	6	0	2	0	0	0	2 (Note: Appearance(s) in the EFL Trophy)	0	10	0
Bradford City (loan)	2024–25	League Two	16	0	—		—		—		16	0
Leyton Orient (loan)	2025–26	League One	15	0	1	0	1	0	2	0	19	0
Sheffield Wednesday (loan)	2025–26	Championship	16	0	—		—		—		16	0
Cercle Brugge	2026–27	Belgian Pro League	1	0	0	0	—		—		1	0
Career totals			68	0	5	0	2	0	4	0	79	0

=== International ===
As of match played on 16 May 2026

Appearances and goals by national team and year
National team	Year	Apps	Goals
Republic of Ireland
Republic of Ireland	2026	1	0
Total		1	0
