= Bobby Pointon =

English footballer (born 2004)

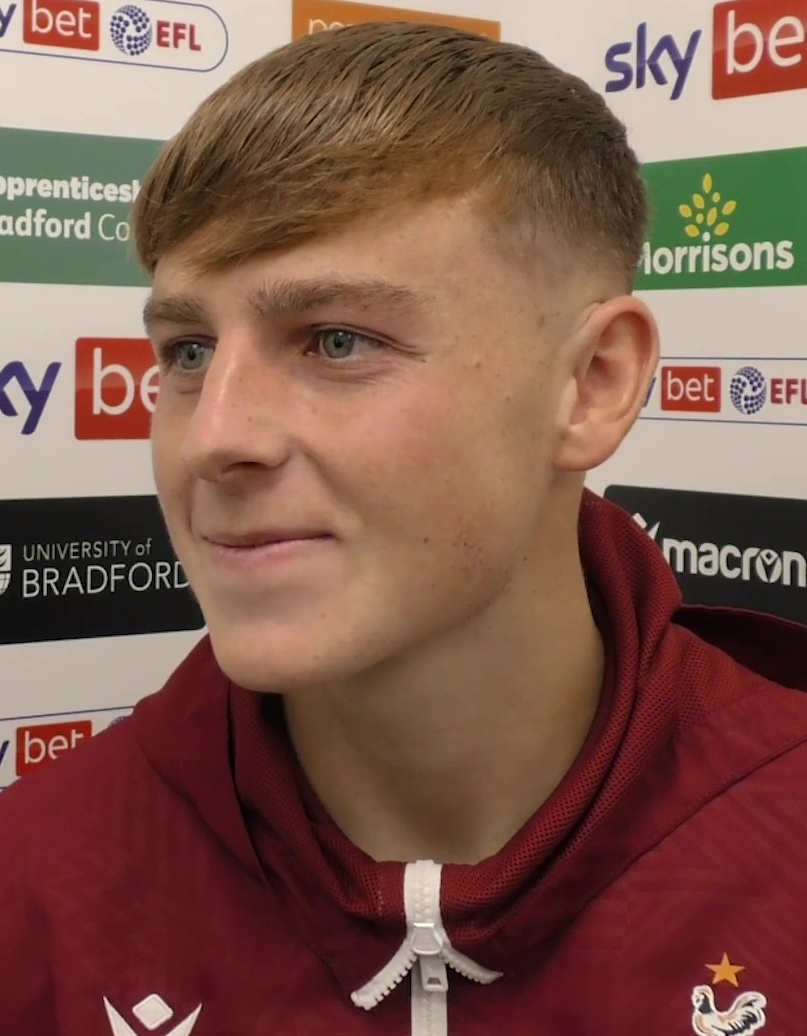
- Pointon with Bradford City in 2023

Personal information
- Full name: Bobby Michael Pointon
- Date of birth: 4 January 2004 (age 22)
- Place of birth: Low Moor, Bradford, England
- Height: 1.70 m (5 ft 7 in)
- Position: Midfielder

Team information
- Current team: Bradford City
- Number: 23

Youth career
- Bradford City

Senior career*
Years	Team	Apps	(Gls)
2022–	Bradford City	109	(22)
2022	→ Brighouse Town (loan)	4	(3)
2022	→ Farsley Celtic (loan)	4	(0)
2022–2023	→ Liversedge (loan)	4	(0)
- * Club domestic league appearances and goals as of 14:56, 8 November 2026 (UTC)

Bobby Michael Pointon (born 4 January 2004) is an English professional footballer who plays as a midfielder for EFL League One club Bradford City.

== Career ==
=== Bradford City ===
==== Early career ====
Born in Low Moor, Bradford, Pointon began his career with Bradford City, and was one of nine players to turn professional in July 2022. He moved on loan to Brighouse Town later that month. After three goals in four games he then moved on loan to Farsley Celtic in September 2022, with Bradford City manager Mark Hughes saying it was Pointon's challenge to deal with football at a higher level. The loan ended prematurely in November 2022, and he moved on loan to Liversedge a few days later. In December 2022 the loan was extended to the end of the season.

He was offered a new contract by Bradford City in May 2023. He signed a new one-year contract with Bradford City in June 2023.

==== 2023–24 season ====
Ahead of the 2023–24 season, Bradford City manager Mark Hughes said he hoped that Pointon and fellow Academy graduates Harvey Rowe and Dylan Youmbi would cope with the first-team environment and continue their development with the club. He made his full debut for the club on 9 September 2023, and was praised by Hughes for his performance, as well as by teammate Alex Gilliead. Hughes then rested Pointon following two starts in a row, saying "it's about him developing his knowledge within the game itself. It's all part of his education".

Pointon scored his first goal for Bradford City in a 1–0 win at home against Swindon Town, on 7 October 2023.

After being dropped by new Bradford City manager Graham Alexander, Alexander said that Pointon was still in his plans. After a return to the first-team in the EFL Trophy in January 2024, Pointon said that he hoped he had given Alexander a "headache" when considering future line-ups.

Pointon made his first start in two months on 29 March 2024, scoring a goal in a 2–0 victory, ending a run of four successive defeats. At the end of the season, after a run of form, Pointon said he was not daunted by the praise he was receiving from fans. He scored 4 goals for the club in the 2023–24 season.

At the end of the 2023–24 season, Bradford City triggered a contract extension. In June 2024, after Pointon changed agents, the club began fresh contract talks with him. In July 2024, Pointon signed a new two-year contract, with the option of a third year.

==== 2024–25 season ====
Pointon scored his first goal of the 2024–25 season on 24 August 2024, with Alexander stating that he remained in his first-team plans despite not having started a game so far that season. Alexander later said that he expected more from Pointon in his second season with the first-team, with Pointon then scoring his third goal of the season in the next game, a 3–1 win over Newport which was the club's first victory in 5 games. He was injured in March 2025, and was out of action for longer than expected, before returning to the team later that month as a substitute. However, the club said they would not rush his return to the starting line-up.

On 5 April 2025 he scored a goal within 12 seconds in an eventual 2–0 home victory, the club's fastest ever goal. Later that month he was nominated for League Two's Young Player of the Season. He scored 8 goals in 50 games as Bradford City earned automatic promotion to League One at the end of the 2024–25 season.

==== 2025–26 season ====
Ahead of the 2025–26 season, Pointon said he was looking forward to playing against local rivals Huddersfield Town. Pointon was then praised by Bradford City's CEO Ryan Sparks for having made the transition from academy to first-team. He was eased into pre-season by manager Graham Alexander, with his efforts praised by new teammate Max Power.

After scoring on the opening day of the season, Pointon signed a new two-year contract with the club, with the option of a third year. The club said it was due to Pointon's improving performances.

On 13 September 2025, Pointon was reported to have scored a first-half hat-trick – his first ever – in a 3–1 victory against Huddersfield Town. However, his third goal was later credited to teammate Josh Neufville.

Pointon suffered a shoulder injury in October 2025. On 13 December 2025, he made his 100th appearance for City, scoring a goal. Later that month he downplayed the club's good form and strong league position. He suffered an injury to his foot on Boxing Day, and was expected to be out until mid-January 2026. He returned to the team in early 2026.

In March 2026 he scored his first away goal of the season, dedicating it to his ill grandmother, who died shortly after the match. Later that month, he spoke about being a mentor to the club's new players, despite his young age, as he was the club's second-longest serving first-team player.

In April 2026 he was praised by Alexander, before suffering an ankle injury later that month, for which he considered a "risky" short-term fix to be able to play in the club's final games of the season. He did not return for the end of the regular season, but was hopeful of making the play-offs.

He was voted the 2025–26 Players' Player of the Year, alongside Antoni Sarcevic. He also won Sportsman of the Year at the Bradford Sports Awards.

==== 2026–27 season ====
Ahead of the 2026–27 season, Alexander said that Pointon would benefit from the summer break to regain fitness, and praised Pointon as a player. Pointon spoke positively about the club's training camp in Austria.

On the eve of the first game of the season, an EFL Cup match against Rochdale, Pointon said he was hoping for a good cup run. He also said he was looking forward to playing recently relegated Sheffield Wednesday.

After starting the season on the bench, Pointon broke back into the starting team after impressing Alexander, and Alexander later praised Pointon's finishing skills after scoring the only goal in a 1–0 win away at Luton on 19 September 2026.

Pointon suffered a knee injury in November 2026, and was anticipated to be out for some weeks.

== Playing style ==
As a youngster, Pointon copied the playing style of Nahki Wells, who he described as his "hero". During the 2023–24 season, he was mentored by teammate Jamie Walker. His attitude has been praised by manager Graham Alexander.

Whilst usually an attacking midfielder, he has also been used as a left wing back, being praised in the media despite playing out of position.

== Personal life ==
Pointon and his family are Bradford City supporters. He was a boxer as a teenager. He has been involved with charitable endeavours with local charities in Bradford.

== Career statistics ==
As of match played on 7 November 2026

Appearances and goals by club, season and competition
Club	Season	League			FA Cup		EFL Cup		Other		Total	
Club	Season	Division	Apps	Goals	Apps	Goals	Apps	Goals	Apps	Goals	Apps	Goals
Bradford City	2022–23	League Two	0	0	0	0	0	0	0	0	0	0
Bradford City	2023–24	League Two	24	4	1	0	1	0	6 (Note: Appearances in the EFL Trophy.)	0	32	4
Bradford City	2024–25	League Two	40	6	2	0	1	0	7	2	50	8
Bradford City	2025–26	League One	33	10	0	0	2	0	2 (Note: One appearance in the EFL Trophy, one appearance in the play-offs)	0	37	10
Bradford City	2026–27	League One	12	2	1	0	3	0	1	0	17	2
Bradford City	Total		109	22	4	0	7	0	17	2	137	24
Brighouse Town (loan)	2022–23	Northern Premier League	4	3	0	0	0	0	0	0	4	3
Farsley Celtic (loan)	2022–23	National League North	4	0	0	0	0	0	0	0	4	0
Liversedge (loan)	2022–23	Northern Premier League	4	0	0	0	0	0	1 (Note: Appearance in the West Riding County Cup Final.)	0	5	0
Career total			121	25	4	0	7	0	18	2	150	27
