= Brad Halliday =

English footballer (born 1995)

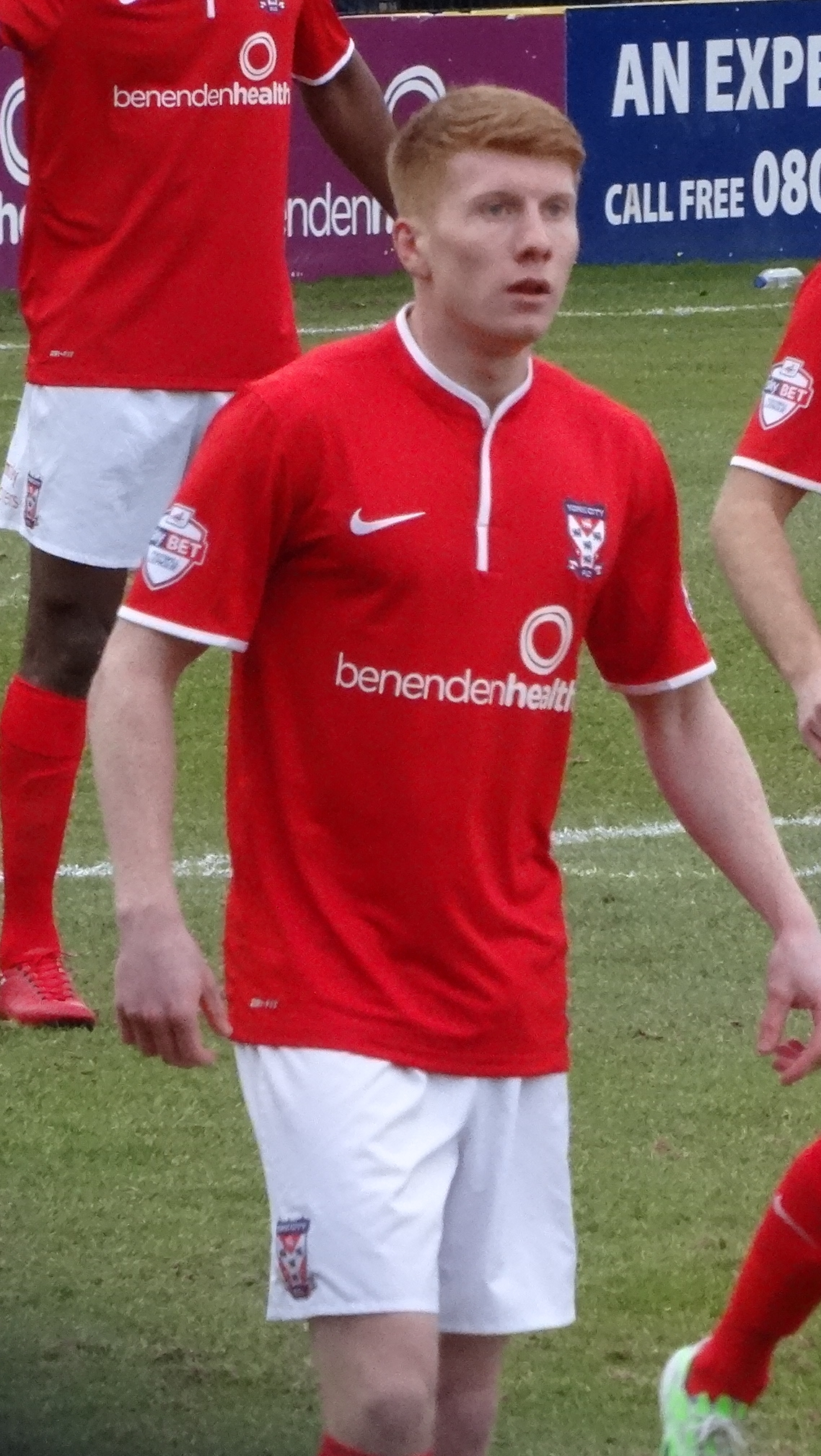
- Halliday playing for York City in 2015

Personal information
- Full name: Bradley Halliday
- Date of birth: 10 July 1995 (age 31)
- Place of birth: Redcar, England
- Height: 5 ft 11 in (1.80 m)
- Positions: Defender; midfielder

Team information
- Current team: Dundee
- Number: 2

Youth career
- 2000–2010: Redcar Town
- 2010–2013: Middlesbrough
- 2013: Newcastle United
- 2013–2014: Middlesbrough

Senior career*
Years	Team	Apps	(Gls)
2014–2016	Middlesbrough	0	(0)
2014–2015	→ York City (loan)	24	(1)
2015	→ Hartlepool United (loan)	6	(0)
2015–2016	→ Accrington Stanley (loan)	32	(0)
2016–2019	Cambridge United	111	(2)
2019–2021	Doncaster Rovers	71	(1)
2021–2022	Fleetwood Town	3	(0)
2022–2026	Bradford City	142	(7)
2026–	Dundee	16	(0)
- * Club domestic league appearances and goals as of 7 November 2026

Bradley Halliday (born 10 July 1995) is an English professional footballer who plays as a defender or midfielder for Scottish Premiership club Dundee.

He previously played for Fleetwood Town, Cambridge United, Middlesbrough and Bradford City, and had loan spells with York City, Hartlepool United and Accrington Stanley.

== Early and personal life ==
Halliday was born and raised in Redcar, North Yorkshire. Halliday is engaged with two young children. He attended Prior Pursglove College in Guisborough, North Yorkshire.

== Career ==
=== Early career ===
Halliday had been playing for Redcar Town's youth team for 10 years when joining the Middlesbrough academy in 2010. He later returned to Redcar although Middlesbrough continued to monitor his progress. Halliday was spotted playing for Redcar by a Newcastle United scout before joining the club's academy in early 2013. He rejoined Middlesbrough after impressing their manager Dave Parnaby during a trial, signing a professional contract with the club in August 2013.

Having played regularly for Middlesbrough's under-21s in the 2014–15 season, Halliday joined League Two club York City on 14 November 2014 on a one-month youth loan to provide cover and competition for right back Marvin McCoy. He made his first-team debut in York's 3–2 home defeat to AFC Wimbledon on 13 December 2014, and having been named man of the match his loan was extended until 17 January 2015 two days after the match. He established himself in the team ahead of McCoy before receiving the first red card of his senior career for a two-footed tackle in York's 1–0 home win over Accrington Stanley on 26 December 2014. After serving a three-match suspension his loan at York was extended until the end of the season. Halliday scored his first career goal with an 85th-minute equaliser in a 1–1 draw away to Portsmouth on 2 May 2015 with a shot into the bottom right corner after capitalising on a slip from Dan Butler. He finished his loan at York with 24 appearances and 1 goal.

Halliday joined League Two club Hartlepool United on a one-month loan on 10 September 2015, as cover for the injured Jordan Richards and Michael Duckworth and the suspended Carl Magnay. He made his debut two days later in a 1–0 away loss to Exeter City, and finished the loan spell with six appearances. On 20 October 2015, he joined another League Two club, Accrington Stanley, on a one-month emergency loan, debuting the same day in a 4–3 home defeat to AFC Wimbledon. Having made 11 appearances for Accrington, his loan was extended for the rest of 2015–16 on 4 January 2016.

=== Cambridge United ===
On 31 August 2016, Halliday signed for League Two club Cambridge United on a long-term contract for an undisclosed fee.

He was offered a new contract by Cambridge United at the end of the 2018–19 season.

=== Doncaster Rovers ===
On 24 May 2019, he signed for League One side Doncaster Rovers on a two-year deal.

=== Fleetwood Town ===
Halliday joined Fleetwood Town on a two-year deal on 4 June 2021.

=== Bradford City ===
Halliday joined Bradford City on his birthday – 10 July 2022 – on a two-year deal.

He made his 100th appearance for the club on 6 April 2024, scoring the only goal in a 1–0 home victory against Gillingham. He was Bradford City's Player of the Year for the 2023–24 season. At the end of the 2023–24 season, Bradford City triggered a contract extension.

At the start of the 2024–25 season, Halliday welcomed competition for the first-team with loan signing Jay Benn.

=== Dundee ===
On 14 January 2026, Halliday joined Scottish Premiership club Dundee on a two-and-a-half year deal after he had his contract with Bradford terminated by mutual consent. On 31 January, Halliday made his debut for the Dark Blues in a league draw away to St Mirren.

== Career statistics ==
As of match played 7 November 2026

Appearances and goals by club, season and competition
Club	Season	League			National cup		League cup		Other		Total	
Club	Season	Division	Apps	Goals	Apps	Goals	Apps	Goals	Apps	Goals	Apps	Goals
Middlesbrough	2014–15	Championship	0	0	—		0	0	—		0	0
Middlesbrough	2015–16	Championship	0	0	—		—		—		0	0
Middlesbrough	2016–17	Premier League	0	0	—		0	0	—		0	0
Middlesbrough	Total		0	0	—		0	0	0	0	0	0
York City (loan)	2014–15	League Two	24	1	—		—		—		24	1
Hartlepool United (loan)	2015–16	League Two	6	0	—		—		—		6	0
Accrington Stanley (loan)	2015–16	League Two	32	0	2	0	—		1 (Note: Appearance in League Two play-offs)	0	35	0
Cambridge United	2016–17	League Two	30	1	3	0	—		1 (Note: Appearance(s) in EFL Trophy)	0	34	1
Cambridge United	2017–18	League Two	43	1	2	0	0	0	1	0	46	1
Cambridge United	2018–19	League Two	38	0	1	0	1	0	3	0	43	0
Cambridge United	Total		111	2	6	0	1	0	5	0	123	2
Doncaster Rovers	2019–20	League One	34	0	3	0	1	0	4	0	42	0
Doncaster Rovers	2020–21	League One	37	1	4	0	1	0	3	0	45	1
Doncaster Rovers	Total		71	1	7	0	2	0	7	0	87	1
Fleetwood Town	2021–22	League One	3	0	0	0	1	0	0	0	4	0
Bradford City	2022–23	League Two	44	1	1	0	2	0	4	0	51	1
Bradford City	2023–24	League Two	44	4	1	0	3	0	5	0	53	4
Bradford City	2024–25	League Two	43	2	2	0	1	0	6	0	52	2
Bradford City	2025–26	League One	11	0	1	0	2	1	3	0	17	1
Bradford City	Total		142	7	5	0	8	1	18	0	173	8
Dundee	2025–26	Scottish Premiership	10	0	1	0	—		0	0	11	0
Dundee	2026–27	Scottish Premiership	6	0	0	0	2	0	0	0	8	0
Dundee	Total		16	0	1	0	2	0	0	0	19	0
Career total			405	11	21	0	14	1	31	0	471	12

== Honours ==
Individual

- EFL League Two Team of the Season: 2023–24
- Bradford City Player of the Year: 2023–24
- PFA Team of the Year: 2024–25 League Two
