= 2024–25 Bradford City A.F.C. season =

122nd season in existence of Bradford City AFC

Bradford City
2024–25 season
- Chairman: Stefan Rupp
- Manager: Graham Alexander
- Stadium: Valley Parade
- League Two: 3rd (promoted)
- FA Cup: Second round
- EFL Cup: First round
- EFL Trophy: Semi-finals
- Top goalscorer: League: Andy Cook (12); All: Andy Cook (15)
- Average home league attendance: 17,762
Home colours	Away colours	Third colours

The 2024–25 season is the 122nd season in the history of Bradford City Association Football Club and their sixth consecutive season in League Two. In addition to the domestic league, the club also participated in the FA Cup, the EFL Cup, and the EFL Trophy.

== Transfers ==
=== In ===
Date	Pos.	Player	From	Fee	Ref.
14 June 2024 (Note: The transfer was announced on 20 May, and would become official on 14 June once the transfer window re-opened)	CB	Neill Byrne (IRL)	Stockport County (ENG)	Undisclosed	
1 July 2024 (Note: The transfer was announced on 31 May, and would become official on 1 July once his Notts County contract expired)	CB	Aden Baldwin (ENG)	Notts County (ENG)	Free	
1 July 2024 (Note: The transfer was announced on 29 May, and would become official on 1 July once his Mansfield Town contract expired)	RB	Callum Johnson (ENG)	Mansfield Town (ENG)	Free	
1 July 2024 (Note: The transfer was announced on 17 May, and would become official on 1 July once his Stockport County contract expired)	CM	Antoni Sarcevic (ENG)	Stockport County (ENG)	Free	
4 July 2024	RW	Tyreik Wright (IRL)	Plymouth Argyle (ENG)	Undisclosed	
1 October 2024	CB	Paul Huntington (ENG)	Carlisle United (ENG)	Free	.
6 October 2024	CM	Corry Evans (NIR)	Sunderland (ENG)	Free	
1 January 2025 (Note: The transfer was announced on 30 December, and would become official on 1 January once the transfer window re-opened)	AM	George Lapslie (ENG)	Gillingham (ENG)	Undisclosed	
10 January 2025	AM	Tommy Leigh (ENG)	Milton Keynes Dons (ENG)	Undisclosed	
3 February 2025	CB	Romoney Crichlow (ENG)	Peterborough United (ENG)	Free	
3 February 2025	GK	Joe Hilton (ENG)	Blackburn Rovers (ENG)	Undisclosed	

=== Out ===
Date	Pos.	Player	To	Fee	Ref.
14 June 2024 (Note: The transfer was announced on 28 May, and would become official on 14 June once the transfer window re-opened)	CB	Timi Odusina (ENG)	Woking (ENG)	Undisclosed	
30 August 2024	LW	Alex Gilliead (ENG)	Shrewsbury Town (ENG)	Free	
30 August 2024	CF	Jake Young (ENG)	Stevenage (ENG)	Undisclosed	

=== Loaned in ===
Date	Pos.	Player	From	Date until	Ref.
1 August 2024	CB	Jack Shepherd (ENG)	Barnsley (ENG)	End of Season	
12 August 2024	CF	Olly Sanderson (ENG)	Fulham (ENG)	9 January 2025 (Note: On 9 January, Sanderson was recalled to his parent club Fulham)	
23 August 2024	AM	Joe Adams (GUE)	Wigan Athletic (ENG)	1 January 2025 (Note: On 1 January, Adams returned to Wigan early due to a cruciate ligament injury)	
30 August 2024	RB	Jay Benn (ENG)	Lincoln City (ENG)	End of Season	
30 August 2024	CB	Cheick Diabate (ENG)	Exeter City (ENG)	6 January 2025 (Note: On 6 January, Diabate was recalled to his parent club Exeter)	
3 January 2025	CM	Brandon Khela (ENG)	Birmingham City (ENG)	End of Season	
8 January 2025	CF	Michael Mellon (SCO)	Burnley (ENG)	End of Season	
3 February 2025	LB	Tayo Adaramola (IRL)	Crystal Palace (ENG)	End of Season	

=== Loaned out ===
Date	Pos.	Player	To	Date until	Ref.
20 August 2024	RW	Adam Wilson (KEN)	The New Saints (WAL)	End of Season	
23 August 2024	CB	Sam Stubbs (ENG)	Cheltenham Town (ENG)	End of Season	
15 January 2025	CF	Harry Ibbitson (ENG)	Guiseley (ENG)	14 March 2025 (Note: On 14 March, Ibbiton's loan at Guiseley was extended by a further month)	
17 January 2025	CF	Tyler Smith (ENG)	Barrow (ENG)	End of Season	
3 February 2025	CF	Vadaine Oliver (ENG)	Shrewsbury Town (ENG)	End of Season	
4 March 2025	CM	Gabriel Wadsworth (ENG)	Bradford (Park Avenue) (ENG)	End of Season	
6 March 2025	GK	Zac Hadi (ENG)	Liversedge (ENG)	End of Season	

=== Released / Out of Contract ===
Date	Pos.	Player	Subsequent club	Join date	Ref.
16 May 2024	CB	Ash Taylor (WAL)	Bruno's Magpies (GIB)	1 July 2024	
30 June 2024	CB	Finn Cousin-Dawson (NIR)	Yeovil Town (ENG)	1 July 2024	
30 June 2024	CB	Matthew Platt (ENG)	Notts County (ENG)	1 July 2024	
30 June 2024	GK	Heath Richardson (ENG)	Cleethorpes Town (ENG)	1 July 2024	
30 June 2024	RB	Harvey Rowe (ENG)	Farsley Celtic (ENG)	1 July 2024	
30 June 2024	CF	Dylan Youmbi (ENG)	Farsley Celtic (ENG)	2 July 2024	
30 June 2024	LB	Noah Wadsworth (ENG)	Hull City (ENG)	3 July 2024	
30 June 2024	RB	Luke Hendrie (ENG)	Morecambe (ENG)	12 July 2024	
30 June 2024	AM	Harry Chapman (ENG)	Barnet (ENG)	9 August 2024	
30 June 2024	CB	Sam Bentley (ENG)	Guiseley (ENG)	10 September 2024	
30 June 2024	LB	Liam Ridehalgh (ENG)	Guiseley (ENG)	16 September 2024	
30 June 2024	CF	Isaac Robinson (ENG)			
30 June 2024	CF	Matt Derbyshire (ENG)	Retired		
30 August 2024	DM	Kevin McDonald (SCO)	Exeter City (ENG)	13 November 2024	
6 January 2025	CM	Corry Evans (NIR)	Oldham Athletic (ENG)	15 January 2025	

== Pre-season and friendlies ==
On 17 May, Bradford announced their pre-season plans, with friendlies against Chorley, Scunthorpe United, Sunderland and Altincham along with an overseas tour of Austria. A month later, it was confirmed that the Bantams would face SV Ried II during their Austria tour. On 3 July, the club confirmed they would also face Guiseley, as a replacement for the cancelled Scunthorpe United visit.

Win Draw Loss Fixtures

6 July 2024 Friendly	Chorley	2–0	Bradford City	Chorley
14:00 BST	Carr 1', 27'	Report		Stadium: Victory Park; Attendance: 952
Note: Fixture was initially scheduled for a 15:00 kick-off, but was moved to allow supporters to also watch England in the UEFA Euro 2024.

13 July 2024 Friendly	Scunthorpe United	Cancelled	Bradford City	Scunthorpe
15:00 BST				Stadium: Glanford Park
Note: Fixture was cancelled on request from Scunthorpe citing the playing surface would not be ready in time.

13 July 2024 Friendly	Guiseley	2–1	Bradford City	Guiseley
15:00 BST	Wright 38'; Trialist 43'	Report	Pattison 59'	Stadium: Nethermoor Park; Attendance: 1,562

16 July 2024 Friendly	Sheffield United	2–1	Bradford City	Apperley Bridge
13:00 BST			Cook	Stadium: Training Ground; Attendance: BCD

24 July 2024 Friendly	SV Ried II	1–2	Bradford City	Obertraun, Austria
17:00 CEST (16:00 BST)	Steinmann 5'	Report	Cook 37'; Oliver 86'	Stadium: Obertraun resort

30 July 2024 Friendly	Bradford City	2–1	Sunderland	Bradford
19:30 BST	Cook 40'; Kavanagh 43'	Report	Mundle 61'	Stadium: Valley Parade; Attendance: 4,374

3 August 2024 Friendly	Altrincham	0–0	Bradford City	Altrincham
15:00 BST		Report		Stadium: Moss Lane; Attendance: 1,106

== Competitions ==
=== League Two ===
==== League table ====
Pos	Team	Pld	W	D	L	GF	GA	GD	Pts	Promotion, qualification or relegation
1	Doncaster Rovers (C, P)	46	24	12	10	73	50	+23	84	Promotion to EFL League One
2	Port Vale (P)	46	22	14	10	65	46	+19	80	Promotion to EFL League One
3	Bradford City (P)	46	22	12	12	64	45	+19	78	Promotion to EFL League One
4	Walsall	46	21	14	11	75	54	+21	77	Qualification for League Two play-offs
5	AFC Wimbledon (O, P)	46	20	13	13	56	35	+21	73	Qualification for League Two play-offs

Source: EFL Official Website
Rules for classification: 1) Points; 2) Goal difference; 3) Number of goals scored; 4) Head-to-head results; 5) Wins; 6) Away goals; 7) Penalty points (sec 9.5); 8) 12-point sending off offences
(C) Champions; (O) Play-off winners; (P) Promoted

==== Results summary ====
Overall								Home						Away					
Pld	W	D	L	GF	GA	GD	Pts	W	D	L	GF	GA	GD	W	D	L	GF	GA	GD
46	22	12	12	64	45	+19	78	17	4	2	39	13	+26	5	8	10	25	32	−7

Last updated: 26 April 2025.
Source: Soccerway

==== Results by round ====
Round	1	2	3	4	5	6	7	8	9	10	11	12	13	14	15	16	18	19	20	21	22	23	24	25	27	28	29	30	31	17^{1}	32	33	26^{2}	34	35	36	37	38	39	40	41	42	43	44	45	46
Ground	A	H	H	A	H	A	H	A	A	H	A	H	A	H	A	A	H	A	H	A	H	H	A	H	A	H	H	A	H	H	A	H	A	A	H	A	H	H	A	A	H	A	H	A	A	H
Result	W	D	W	L	W	L	D	L	D	W	W	W	D	L	L	D	D	D	W	L	W	W	D	W	W	W	W	L	W	W	D	W	W	W	W	L	L	W	D	L	W	L	D	D	L	W
Position	7	7	2	9	5	7	8	13	13	9	7	5	5	7	10	8	10	11	10	12	10	10	9	8	8	7	4	7	4	3	3	5	2	2	2	2	2	2	2	2	1	2	3	3	3	3
Points	3	4	7	7	10	10	11	11	12	15	18	21	22	22	22	23	24	25	28	28	31	34	35	38	41	44	47	47	50	53	54	57	60	63	66	66	66	69	70	70	73	73	74	75	75	78

Source: EFL
A = Away; H = Home; W = Win; D = Draw; L = Loss; P = Postponed
Notes:
- ^{1} Matchday 17 (vs. Accrington Stanley) was postponed due to a unplayable playing surface.
- ^{2} Matchday 26 (vs. Bromley) was postponed due to the opposition being in FA Cup action.

==== Matches ====
On 26 June, the League Two fixtures were announced.

Win Draw Loss Fixtures

10 August 2024 1	Milton Keynes Dons	1–2	Bradford City	Milton Keynes
15:00 BST	Offord (yellow card) 6'; Gilbey 20'	Report	Pattison 3'; Sherring 5' (o.g.)	Stadium: Stadium MK; Attendance: 7,561; Referee: Tom Reeves

17 August 2024 2	Bradford City	0–0	Salford City	Bradford
15:00 BST	Byrne (yellow card) 36'; Cook (yellow card) 90+3'	Report	Woodburn (yellow card) 31'; Fornah (yellow card) 62'; Chesters (yellow card) 70'; Garbutt (yellow card) 90+2'	Stadium: Valley Parade; Attendance: 16,183; Referee: Geoff Eltringham

24 August 2024 3	Bradford City	3–1	Bromley	Bradford
15:00 BST	Smallwood 10' (pen.), (yellow card) 48'; Cook 41'; Pointon (yellow card) 64', (goal) 79'	Report	Charles (red card) 8'; Grant (yellow card) 55'; Webster 86'	Stadium: Valley Parade; Attendance: 16,001; Referee: Scott Simpson

31 August 2024 4	Grimsby Town	2–1	Bradford City	Cleethorpes
15:00 BST	Rose (yellow card) 10', (goal) 28'; Warren (yellow card) 45+4'; Svanþórsson 47'; McJannet (yellow card) 62'; Rodgers (yellow card) 68'	Report	Pattison (yellow card) 35'; Shepherd (yellow card) 52'; Wright (yellow card) 72'; Sanderson 78'; Walker (yellow card) 90+1'	Stadium: Blundell Park; Attendance: 7,004; Referee: Stephen Martin

7 September 2024 5	Bradford City	2–1	Carlisle United	Bradford
15:00 BST	Cook 2', 70'; Byrne (yellow card) 29'; Kelly (yellow card) 78'; Diabate (yellow card) 90+3'	Report	Neal (yellow card) 20', (goal) 58'; Davies (yellow card) 67'; McGeouch (yellow card) 81'	Stadium: Valley Parade; Attendance: 18,041; Referee: Paul Howard

14 September 2024 6	Walsall	2–1	Bradford City	Bescot
15:00 BST	Allen 19' (pen.)	Report	Smallwood (yellow card) 12'; Sanderson 38'	Stadium: Bescot Stadium; Attendance: 5,967; Referee: Lewis Smith

21 September 2024 7	Bradford City	0–0	AFC Wimbledon	Bradford
15:00 BST	Wright (yellow card) 80'; Smallwood (yellow card) 90+2'; Cook (yellow card) 90+3'	Report	Hippolyte (yellow card) 90+2'; Lewis (yellow card) 90+3'	Stadium: Valley Parade; Attendance: 16,344; Referee: Andy Davies

28 September 2024 8	Harrogate Town	2–1	Bradford City	Harrogate
12:30 BST	Dooley 11'; Taylor 23'; Belshaw (yellow card) 89'; Sutton (yellow card) 90+3'	Report	Cook 28'; Walker (yellow card) 40'	Stadium: Wetherby Road; Attendance: 3,059; Referee: Martin Coy
Note: Fixture was initially scheduled for a 15:00 kick-off, but was moved for live Sky Sports broadcast.

1 October 2024 9	Morecambe	1–1	Bradford City	Morecambe
19:45 GMT	Diabate 5' (o.g.); Jones (yellow card) 44'	Report	Shepherd 88'	Stadium: Mazuma Stadium; Attendance: 3,606; Referee: Elliot Bell

7 October 2024 10	Bradford City	3–1	Newport County	Bradford
20:00 GMT	Byrne (yellow card) 35'; Cook 39'; Walker 75'; Pointon 85'; Shepherd (yellow card) 89'	Report	Driscoll-Glennon (yellow card) 20'; Townsend (yellow card) 23'; Hudlin 65', (yellow card) 68'	Stadium: Valley Parade; Referee: Ben Toner
Note: Fixture was initially scheduled for 5 October, but was moved for live Sky Sports broadcast.

12 October 2024 11	Tranmere Rovers	0–2	Bradford City	Birkenhead
15:00 BST	Morris (yellow card) 62'	Report	Cook 23', 72'; Diabate (yellow card) 39'; Walker (yellow card) 45+1'; Benn (yellow card) 90+5'	Stadium: Prenton Park; Referee: Sunny Singh Gill

19 October 2024 12	Bradford City	2–1	Gillingham	Bradford
15:00 BST	Wright (yellow card) 24'; Byrne 38', (yellow card) 70'; Shepherd 45+3', (yellow card) 61'; Halliday (yellow card) 82'; Pointon (yellow card) 83'	Report	Clarke 11', (yellow card) 24'; Dieng (yellow card) 22'; Clark (yellow card) 42'; Coleman (yellow card) 45+4'	Stadium: Valley Parade; Attendance: 16,471; Referee: Ross Joyce

22 October 2024 13	Cheltenham Town	1–1	Bradford City	Cheltenham
19:45 BST	Payne (yellow card) 5'; Young 15'; Colwill (yellow card) 26'; Sohna (yellow card) 82'	Report	Byrne 8'; Diabate (yellow card) 82'	Stadium: Whaddon Road; Attendance: 3,404; Referee: Jamie O'Connor

26 October 2024 14	Bradford City	1–2	Doncaster Rovers	Bradford
15:00 BST	Shepherd (yellow card) 6'; Diabate (yellow card) 36'; Cook 83'; Kavanagh (yellow card) 90+5'	Report	Sharp (yellow card) 6', (goal) 66'; Hurst (yellow card) 13'; Maxwell (yellow card) 36'; Molyneux 57'; Broadbent (yellow card) 86'; Bailey (yellow card) 90+5'	Stadium: Valley Parade; Attendance: 18,269; Referee: Ruebyn Ricardo

9 November 2024 15	Fleetwood Town	1–0	Bradford City	Fleetwood
15:00 GMT	Coughlan 8' (pen.); Shaw (yellow card) 36'	Report	Benn (yellow card) 85'	Stadium: Highbury Stadium; Attendance: 3,971; Referee: Martin Woods

16 November 2024 16	Colchester United	1–1	Bradford City	Colchester
15:00 GMT	McDonnell (yellow card) 64', (goal) 90+9'; Tovide (yellow card) 90+11'	Report	Cook 30', (yellow card) 70'; Shepherd (yellow card) 71'; Richards (yellow card) 78'; Halliday (yellow card) 82'	Stadium: Colchester Community Stadium; Attendance: 4,825; Referee: Carl Brook

3 December 2024 18	Bradford City	1–1	Barrow	Bradford
19:45 GMT	Sanderson (yellow card) 15'; Cook (yellow card) 17', (goal) 79'; Kavanagh (yellow card) 71'; Richards (yellow card) 82'	Report	Stokes (yellow card) 15'; Gotts 57'; Kirk (yellow card) 58'; Farman (yellow card) 70'	Stadium: Valley Parade; Referee: Thomas Parsons

7 December 2024 19	Crewe Alexandra	1–1	Bradford City	Crewe
12:30 GMT	Bogle 47'; Tracey (yellow card) 51'; Sanders (yellow card) 54'; Williams (yellow card) 58'; Powell (yellow card) 90+2'	Report	Baldwin (yellow card) 40'; Benn (yellow card) 48'; Pattison 55', (red card) 57'; Smallwood (yellow card) 58'; Shepherd (yellow card) 90+6'; Walker (yellow card) 90+7'	Stadium: Gresty Road; Referee: Ben Toner
Note: Fixture was initially scheduled for a 15:00 kick-off, but was moved for live Sky Sports broadcast.

14 December 2024 20	Bradford City	1–0	Swindon Town	Bradford
15:00 GMT	Kavanagh 24'; Pointon (yellow card) 74'; Sarcevic (yellow card) 81'	Report	Smith (yellow card) 7'; McGregor (yellow card) 68'	Stadium: Valley Parade; Attendance: 15,751; Referee: Edward Duckworth

21 December 2024 21	Notts County	3–0	Bradford City	Nottingham
15:00 GMT	Jatta 28', 32'; McGoldrick 31'	Report	Kavanagh (yellow card) 42'; Sarcevic (yellow card) 61'	Stadium: Meadow Lane; Attendance: 11,500; Referee: James Durkin

26 December 2024 22	Bradford City	2–1	Port Vale	Bradford
15:00 GMT	Cook 3', 59'; Baldwin (yellow card) 41'; Halliday (yellow card) 63'; Richards (yellow card) 88'	Report	Chislett (yellow card) 28'; Hackford 50'; Debrah (yellow card) 66'; Sang (red card) 90+3'	Stadium: Valley Parade; Attendance: 18,330; Referee: Matthew Corlett

29 December 2024 23	Bradford City	2–1	Chesterfield	Bradford
15:00 GMT	Baldwin (yellow card) 23'; Halliday (yellow card) 24'; Benn (yellow card) 31'; Pointon 42'; Sarcevic 52'; Oduor (yellow card) 82'	Report	Drummond (yellow card) 22'; Dobra 35', (yellow card) 90'	Stadium: Valley Parade; Attendance: 18,730; Referee: Adam Herczeg

1 January 2025 24	Barrow	2–2	Bradford City	Barrow-in-Furness
15:00 GMT	Gotts (yellow card) 12'; Dallas 45+2' (pen.); Acquah 78'	Report	Richards 23'; Halliday (yellow card) 34'; Pattison (yellow card) 45+7'; Oduor 86'	Stadium: Holker Street; Attendance: 3,918; Referee: Thomas Kirk

4 January 2025 25	Bradford City	3–1	Grimsby Town	Bradford
13:00 GMT	Baldwin (yellow card) 39'; Richards 45+1'; Smallwood 48' (pen.), (yellow card) 59'; Pattison 69'; Lapslie (yellow card) 90+1'; Sarcevic (yellow card) 90+4'	Report	McJannet 51'; Khouri (yellow card) 53'; Warren (yellow card) 55'	Stadium: Valley Parade; Attendance: 18,011; Referee: Elliot Bell
Note: Fixture was initially scheduled for a 15:00 kick-off, but was moved following conversations with the EFL.

18 January 2025 27	Carlisle United	0–1	Bradford City	Carlisle
12:30 GMT	McArthur (yellow card) 34'	Report	Kavanagh 54'; Sarcevic (yellow card) 76'; Richards (yellow card) 87'	Stadium: Brunton Park; Attendance: 8,399; Referee: Ben Speedie
Note: Fixture was initially scheduled for a 15:00 kick-off, but was moved for live Sky Sports broadcasting.

25 January 2025 28	Bradford City	3–0	Walsall	Bradford
12:30 GMT	Sarcevic 11'; Pattison 43', 53'	Report	McEntee (yellow card) 45+4'; Okagbue (yellow card) 59'; Johnson (penalty missed) 66'	Stadium: Valley Parade; Attendance: 17,172; Referee: Jacob Miles
Note: Fixture was initially scheduled for a 15:00 kick-off, but was moved for live Sky Sports broadcasting.

28 January 2025 29	Bradford City	1–0	Morecambe	Bradford
19:45 GMT				Stadium: Valley Parade

1 February 2025 30	AFC Wimbledon	1–0	Bradford City	Wimbledon
15:00 GMT	Tilley 13'; Johnson (yellow card) 42'; Lewis (yellow card) 70'; Smith (yellow card) 83'	Report	Richards (yellow card) 31'	Stadium: Plough Lane; Attendance: 8,536; Referee: Simon Mather

8 February 2025 31	Bradford City	1–0	Harrogate Town	Bradford
12:30 GMT	Sarcevic 2'; Smallwood (yellow card) 40'	Report	Bilongo (yellow card) 20'; Fox (yellow card) 85'	Stadium: Valley Parade; Attendance: 17,126; Referee: Oliver Yates
Note: Fixture was initially scheduled for a 15:00 kick-off, but was moved for live Sky Sports broadcasting.

11 February 2025 17	Bradford City	1–0	Accrington Stanley	Bradford
19:45 GMT	Pattison 20', (yellow card) 45+6'; Baldwin (yellow card) 27'; Pointon (yellow card) 43'; Smallwood (yellow card) 45+5'	Report	Woods (yellow card) 36'	Stadium: Valley Parade; Attendance: 15,263; Referee: James Oldham
Note: Fixture was originally scheduled for 23 November, but was postponed due to a unplayable playing surface.

15 February 2025 32	Newport County	0–0	Bradford City	Newport
15:00 GMT		Report	Shepherd (red card) 17'; Leigh (yellow card) 90+1'; Walker (yellow card) 90+6'	Stadium: Rodney Parade; Attendance: 4,031; Referee: Andrew Humphries

22 February 2025 33	Bradford City	2–0	Milton Keynes Dons	Bradford
15:00 GMT	Sarcevic 11', 60'; Adaramola (yellow card) 39'; Khela (yellow card) 50'; Crichlow (yellow card) 68'	Report	Patterson (yellow card) 37'	Stadium: Valley Parade; Attendance: 17,666; Referee: Seb Stockbridge

25 February 2025 26	Bromley	0–1	Bradford City	Bromley
19:45 GMT			Pointon 82'	Stadium: Hayes Lane; Attendance: 2,442; Referee: Jamie O'Connor
Note: Fixture was initially scheduled for 11 January, but was rearranged due to Bromley's FA Cup involvements.

1 March 2025 34	Salford City	1–2	Bradford City	Kersal
12:30 GMT	Okoronkwo 30'; Mnoga (yellow card) 35'; Lund (yellow card) 60'	Report	Halliday 71'; Mellon 90+4', (yellow card) 90+5'	Stadium: Moor Lane; Attendance: 3,656; Referee: Martin Coy
Note: Fixture was initially scheduled for a 15:00 kick-off, but was moved for live Sky Sports broadcasting.

4 March 2025 35	Bradford City	3–0	Cheltenham Town	Bradford
19:45 GMT	Lapslie 31', 53'; Mellon 60'; Kavanagh (yellow card) 84'; Shepherd (yellow card) 88'; Huntington (yellow card) 90+4'	Report	Taylor (yellow card) 27'; Thomas (yellow card) 80'; Dulson (yellow card) 88'	Stadium: Valley Parade; Attendance: 15,229; Referee: Zac Kennard-Kettle

8 March 2025 36	Gillingham	1–0	Bradford City	Gillingham
15:00 GMT	Masterson (yellow card) 3', (goal) 56'; Little (yellow card) 12'; Morgan (yellow card) 19'; Hutton (yellow card) 88'; Nevitt (yellow card) 90+3'	Report	Huntington (yellow card) 45+1'; Shepherd (yellow card) 83'	Stadium: Priestfield Stadium; Attendance: 6,297; Referee: James Durkin

15 March 2025 37	Bradford City	0–1	Tranmere Rovers	Bradford
15:00 GMT	Lapslie (yellow card) 6'; Byrne (yellow card) 45+3'; Baldwin (yellow card) 58'	Report	O'Connor (yellow card) 50'; Hawkes 56' (pen.)	Stadium: Valley Parade; Attendance: 18,845; Referee: Thomas Parsons

22 March 2025 38	Bradford City	4–1	Colchester United	Bradford
15:00 GMT	Kavanagh 31', 70'; Lapslie 41', 78'	Report	Anderson 36'	Stadium: Valley Parade; Attendance: 23,381; Referee: Will Finnie

29 March 2025 39	Accrington Stanley	0–0	Bradford City	Accrington
12:30 GMT	Woods (yellow card) 39'; Matthews (yellow card) 86'	Report	Baldwin (yellow card) 45'; Smallwood (yellow card) 61'; Pattison (yellow card) 86'; Byrne (yellow card) 90+4'	Stadium: Crown Ground; Attendance: 4,572; Referee: Neil Hair
Note: Fixture was initially scheduled for a 15:00 kick-off, but was moved for live Sky Sports broadcasting.

1 April 2025 40	Port Vale	2–0	Bradford City	Burslem
19:45 BST	Tolaj 11', (yellow card) 86'; Clark 32'	Report	Halliday (yellow card) 21'; Baldwin (yellow card) 67'; Smallwood (penalty missed) 89', (yellow card) 89'; Mellon (yellow card) 90+2'	Stadium: Vale Park; Attendance: 8,659; Referee: Ben Toner

5 April 2025 41	Bradford City	2–0	Crewe Alexandra	Bradford
15:00 BST	Pointon 1'; Halliday (yellow card) 59'; Baldwin (yellow card) 63'; Adaramola (yellow card) 82'; Kavanagh 85', (yellow card) 86'	Report	Cooney (yellow card) 21', (penalty missed) 40'; Conway (yellow card) 32'; Marschall (yellow card) 76'	Stadium: Valley Parade; Attendance: 22,214; Referee: Adam Herczeg

12 April 2025 42	Swindon Town	5–4	Bradford City	Swindon
12:30 BST	Byrne 22' (o.g.); Tshimanga 45+4'; Smith 62', 90' (yellow card) 90+3'; Butterworth (yellow card) 82'; Shepherd 90+5' (o.g.)	Report	Kavanagh 6', 10', 35'; Smallwood (red card) 14'; Khela (yellow card) 30'; Halliday (yellow card) 64' (goal) 77'; Shepherd (yellow card) 80'; Adaramola (yellow card) 82'	Stadium: County Ground; Attendance: 8,051; Referee: Thomas Kirk
Note: Fixture was initially scheduled for a 15:00 kick-off, but was moved for live Sky Sports broadcasting.

17 April 2025 43	Bradford City	1–1	Notts County	Bradford
20:00 BST	Kelly 53'; Halliday (yellow card) 75'; Pattison (yellow card) 85'	Report	Platt (yellow card) 32'; Palmer (yellow card) 45'; McDonald (yellow card) 52'; McGoldrick 69'	Stadium: Valley Parade; Attendance: 20,392; Referee: Farai Hallam
Note: Fixture was initially scheduled for 18 April, but was moved for live Sky Sports broadcasting.

21 April 2025 44	Chesterfield	3–3	Bradford City	Chesterfield
15:00 BST	McFadzean (yellow card) 30'; Mandeville (yellow card) 33', (goal) 90+2'; Colclough (yellow card) 45'; Metcalfe 45+2'; Araujo (yellow card) 63'; Grigg 71'; Olakigbe (yellow card) 90+4'	Report	Pointon 10'; Sarcevic 19' (pen.); Pattison (yellow card) 43', (goal) 49'; S. Walker (yellow card) 75'; Shepherd (yellow card) 90+1'; J. Walker (yellow card) 90+8'	Stadium: SMH Group Stadium; Attendance: 9,520; Referee: Scott Jackson

26 April 2025 45	Doncaster Rovers	2–1	Bradford City	Doncaster
12:30 BST	Broadbent (yellow card) 6'; Street 33'; Sharp 90+1'	Report	Sarcevic (yellow card) 20'; Baldwin (yellow card) 45+3' (yellow-red card) 45+3'; Wright (penalty missed) 85'; Crichlow 90+4'	Stadium: Eco-Power Stadium; Attendance: 12,574; Referee: Ross Joyce
Note: Fixture was initially scheduled for a 15:00 kick-off, but was moved for live Sky Sports broadcasting.

3 May 2025 46	Bradford City	1–0	Fleetwood Town	Bradford
15:00 BST	Sarcevic (yellow card) 45' (yellow-red card) 90+6', (goal) 90+6'	Report	Potter (yellow card) 45+1'; Medley (yellow card) 74'	Stadium: Valley Parade; Attendance: 24,033; Referee: Martin Coy

=== FA Cup ===
Bradford City were drawn at home to Aldershot Town in the first round and away to Morecambe in the second round.

Win Draw Loss Fixtures

2 November 2024 First round	Bradford City	3–1	Aldershot Town	Bradford
15:00 GMT	Oliver 50'; Maghoma 65' (o.g.); Kavanagh 68'; Diabate (yellow card) 85'	Report	Barham 32'	Stadium: Valley Parade; Attendance: 4,737; Referee: Craig Hicks

30 November 2024 Second round	Morecambe	1–0	Bradford City	Morecambe
15:00 GMT	Slew 81'	Report	Benn (yellow card) 31'; Byrne (red card) 77'	Stadium: Mazuma Mobile Stadium; Attendance: 3,101; Referee: Seb Stockbridge

=== EFL Cup ===
On 27 June, the draw for the first round was made, with Bradford being drawn away against Grimsby Town.

Win Draw Loss Fixtures

13 August 2024 First round	Grimsby Town	1–1 (9–8 p)	Bradford City	Cleethorpes
19:45 BST	Wilson 36'; Green (yellow card) 75'	Report	Cook 76'; Baldwin (yellow card) 84'	Stadium: Blundell Park; Attendance: 3,082; Referee: David Coote
	Penalties
	Green (penalty missed); Davies (penalty scored); Vernam (penalty scored); Cass (penalty scored); Gardner (penalty scored); Ainley (penalty scored); Eastwood (penalty scored); McJannet (penalty scored); Khouri (penalty scored); McEachran (penalty scored)		(penalty scored) Smallwood; (penalty missed) Halliday; (penalty scored) Oduor; (penalty scored) Sarcevic; (penalty scored) Cook; (penalty scored) Young; (penalty scored) Baldwin; (penalty scored) Shepherd; (penalty scored) Pointon; (penalty missed) Byrne

=== EFL Trophy ===
In the group stage, Bradford were drawn into Northern Group H alongside Mansfield Town, Rotherham United and Newcastle United U21. They were then drawn away to Stockport County in the round of 32, Aston Villa U21 in the round of 16, Rotherham United in the quarter-finals and Birmingham City in the semi-finals.

Pos	Div	Team	Pld	W	PW	PL	L	GF	GA	GD	Pts	Qualification
1	L1	Rotherham United	3	3	0	0	0	6	1	+5	9	Advance to Round 2
2	L2	Bradford City	3	1	0	1	1	5	3	+2	4	Advance to Round 2
3	L1	Mansfield Town	3	1	0	0	2	3	5	−2	3	
4	ACA	Newcastle United U21	3	0	1	0	2	3	8	−5	2	

Source: EFL

Win Draw Loss Fixtures

3 September 2024 Group stage	Bradford City	2–2 (3–4 p)	Newcastle United U21	Bradford
19:30 GMT	Sanderson 42'; Cook 76'	Report	Parkinson 40'; McArthur (yellow card) 81'; Donaldson 90+2'	Stadium: Valley Parade; Attendance: 1,790; Referee: Dale Baines
	Penalties
	Walker (penalty scored); Smith (penalty scored); Pointon (penalty scored); Pattison (penalty missed); Cook (penalty missed)		(penalty scored) Parkinson; (penalty missed) Stanton; (penalty scored) Turner-Cooke; (penalty scored) Huntley; (penalty scored) Donaldson

17 September 2024 Group stage	Mansfield Town	0–3	Bradford City	Mansfield
19:30 BST	Quinn (yellow card) 81'	Report	Oliver 3'; Pointon 36'; Kavanagh (yellow card) 90+1'; Oduor 90+5'	Stadium: Field Mill; Attendance: 1,594; Referee: James Westgate

19 November 2024 Group stage	Bradford City	0–1	Rotherham United	Bradford
19:30 GMT	Diabate (yellow card) 56'; Walker (yellow card) 63'; Smallwood (yellow card) 76'	Report	McWilliams 5'; Kelly (yellow card) 69'	Stadium: Valley Parade; Attendance: 1,640; Referee: Jacob Miles
Note: Fixture was initially scheduled for 12 November, but was pushed back a week.

==== Knockout stages ====
10 December 2024 Round of 32	Stockport County	2–3	Bradford City	Stockport
19:00 GMT	Norwood 26'; Olaofe (yellow card) 28'; Bailey 33'; Adaramola (yellow card) 45+2'	Report	Kavanagh 13', 63'; Cook 15'; Shepherd (yellow card) 25'; Evans (yellow card) 60'	Stadium: Edgeley Park; Attendance: 1,433; Referee: Aaron Bannister

14 January 2025 Round of 16	Aston Villa U21	1–3	Bradford City	Birmingham
19:30 GMT	Pierre 24'; Taylor (yellow card) 57'	Report	Kavanagh 9'; Shepherd 15'; Johnson 26'	Stadium: Villa Park; Attendance: 1,079; Referee: Ross Joyce

4 February 2025 Quarter-finals	Rotherham United	0–1	Bradford City	Rotherham
19:30 GMT	Raggett (yellow card) 90+1'	Report	Smallwood 58' (pen.); Byrne (yellow card) 90+1'; Walker (yellow card) 90+6'	Stadium: New York Stadium; Attendance: 3,073; Referee: Adam Herczeg

18 February 2025 Semi-finals	Birmingham City	2–1	Bradford City	Birmingham
20:00 GMT	Cochrane (yellow card) 34'; Stansfield 45+3'; Dykes 88'	Report	Halliday (yellow card) 5'; Wright (yellow card) 45+2'; Pointon 52'; Smallwood (yellow card) 90+6'	Stadium: St Andrew's; Attendance: 27,066; Referee: Scott Oldham

== Statistics ==
=== Appearances and goals ===
As of match played 26 April 2025

Players with no appearances are not included on the list
Italics indicate a loaned in player

No.	Pos	Nat	Player	Total		League Two		FA Cup		EFL Cup		EFL Trophy	
No.	Pos	Nat	Player	Apps	Goals	Apps	Goals	Apps	Goals	Apps	Goals	Apps	Goals
1	GK	(England) ENG	Sam Walker	51	0	45+0	0	2+0	0	1+0	0	3+0	0
2	DF	(England) ENG	Brad Halliday	51	2	38+4	2	2+0	0	1+0	0	6+0	0
3	DF	(Republic of Ireland) IRL	Lewis Richards	29	2	17+5	2	1+1	0	1+0	0	4+0	0
5	DF	(Republic of Ireland) IRL	Neill Byrne	33	2	23+3	2	2+0	0	1+0	0	3+1	0
6	MF	(England) ENG	Richard Smallwood	52	3	42+0	2	2+0	0	1+0	0	5+2	1
7	FW	(Scotland) SCO	Jamie Walker	43	1	16+19	1	1+1	0	1+0	0	3+2	0
8	FW	(Republic of Ireland) IRL	Calum Kavanagh	44	13	30+7	9	1+1	1	1+0	0	3+1	3
9	FW	(England) ENG	Andy Cook	29	15	22+0	12	1+1	0	0+1	1	1+3	2
10	MF	(England) ENG	Antoni Sarcevic	27	6	19+4	6	0+0	0	0+1	0	1+2	0
11	MF	(England) ENG	Brandon Khela	15	0	11+4	0	0+0	0	0+0	0	0+0	0
12	DF	(Kenya) KEN	Clarke Oduor	26	2	7+12	1	0+1	0	1+0	0	4+1	1
13	GK	(England) ENG	Colin Doyle	4	0	0+0	0	0+0	0	0+0	0	4+0	0
14	FW	(England) ENG	Tyler Smith	7	0	1+4	0	0+0	0	0+0	0	1+1	0
15	DF	(England) ENG	Aden Baldwin	37	0	30+2	0	0+0	0	1+0	0	1+3	0
16	MF	(England) ENG	Alex Pattison	36	7	23+6	7	0+1	0	0+0	0	5+1	0
17	FW	(Republic of Ireland) IRL	Tyreik Wright	31	0	19+8	0	0+0	0	0+0	0	2+2	0
18	DF	(Republic of Ireland) IRL	Ciaran Kelly	22	1	15+5	1	0+0	0	0+0	0	2+0	0
19	FW	(England) ENG	Vadaine Oliver	18	2	1+11	0	1+1	1	1+0	0	1+2	1
20	DF	(England) ENG	Paul Huntington	21	0	9+9	0	1+0	0	0+0	0	2+0	0
22	DF	(England) ENG	Callum Johnson	14	1	3+8	0	0+0	0	0+0	0	1+2	1
23	FW	(England) ENG	Bobby Pointon	49	8	26+13	6	1+1	0	0+1	0	6+1	2
24	DF	(England) ENG	Jack Shepherd	48	3	30+8	2	2+0	0	1+0	0	6+1	1
26	FW	(Scotland) SCO	Michael Mellon	14	2	5+9	2	0+0	0	0+0	0	0+0	0
27	DF	(England) ENG	Jay Benn	17	0	11+1	0	2+0	0	0+0	0	1+2	0
29	FW	(England) ENG	Harry Ibbitson	1	0	0+0	0	0+0	0	0+0	0	0+1	0
30	DF	(England) ENG	Romoney Crichlow	12	1	8+2	1	0+0	0	0+0	0	2+0	0
32	MF	(England) ENG	George Lapslie	12	4	7+5	4	0+0	0	0+0	0	0+0	0
37	MF	(England) ENG	Tommy Leigh	15	0	6+9	0	0+0	0	0+0	0	0+0	0
45	DF	(Republic of Ireland) IRL	Tayo Adaramola	15	0	14+1	0	0+0	0	0+0	0	0+0	0
Player(s) who featured whilst on loan but returned to parent club during the season:
21	FW	(England) ENG	Olly Sanderson	18	3	6+7	2	2+0	0	0+0	0	3+0	1
25	MF	Guernsey	Joe Adams	3	0	0+1	0	0+0	0	0+0	0	2+0	0
39	DF	(England) ENG	Cheick Diabate	15	0	10+1	0	0+1	0	0+0	0	3+0	0
Player(s) who featured but departed the club permanently during the season:
20	FW	(England) ENG	Jake Young	1	0	0+0	0	0+0	0	0+1	0	0+0	0
30	MF	(Northern Ireland) NIR	Corry Evans	9	0	1+5	0	1+0	0	0+0	0	2+0	0
