= Lewis Richards (footballer, born 2001) =

Footballer (born 2001)

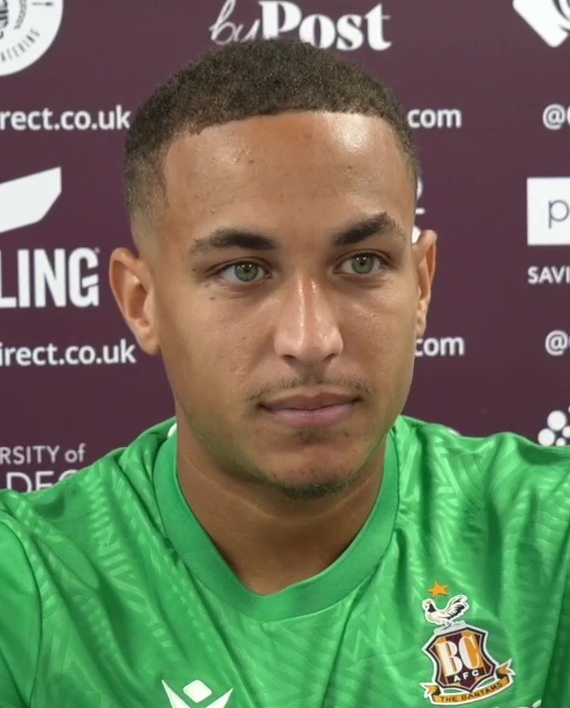
- Richards with Bradford City in 2023

Personal information
- Full name: Lewis Paul Jimmy Richards
- Date of birth: 15 October 2001 (age 25)
- Place of birth: Liverpool, England
- Height: 6 ft 0 in (1.82 m)
- Position: Defender

Team information
- Current team: Crawley Town
- Number: 12

Youth career
- –2016: Brentford
- 2016–2021: Wolverhampton Wanderers

Senior career*
Years	Team	Apps	(Gls)
2021–2023	Wolverhampton Wanderers	0	(0)
2022	→ Harrogate Town (loan)	8	(0)
2022–2023	→ Harrogate Town (loan)	9	(0)
2023–2026	Bradford City	48	(2)
2026–	Crawley Town	21	(0)

International career
2019	Republic of Ireland U19	3	(1)
- * Club domestic league appearances and goals as of 13:59, 22 November 2026 (UTC)

Lewis Paul Jimmy Richards (born 15 October 2001) is a professional footballer who plays as a defender for EFL League Two club Crawley Town. Born in England, he represented Ireland at youth level.

== Career ==
=== Early career ===
Born in Liverpool, Richards began his career in the Brentford Academy, before moving to Wolverhampton Wanderers after the closure of the academy in 2016.

On 13 January 2022, Richards joined League Two club Harrogate Town on loan for the remainder of the 2021–22 season, playing his first game for the club on 22 January in a 3–0 home win against Oldham Athletic, where he was substituted in the 82nd minute for Nathan Sheron.

He returned to Harrogate in July 2022 for a second loan spell. This was cut short in January 2023 when Richards sustained an ankle injury which ruled him out for four months and he returned to his parent club.

=== Bradford City ===
On 18 August 2023, Richards signed for Bradford City, joining on an initial two-year contract. His debut came on 19 August 2023 in a 3–0 away defeat at Morecambe; after the match, he said the players had let the fans down. Richards suffered an injury during a match on 26 December 2023, and was ruled out for a few weeks. After returning to first-team action, he was injured again in February 2024.

In September 2024, in his first league start of the 2024–25 season, Richards suffered an injury. He suffered a further injury, to his shoulder, in November 2024. His shoulder injury returned in February 2025, but Richards delayed surgery in order to remain available for the club in their late season promotion push. Later that month he was reported to be close to a return.

At the end of the 2024–25 season, Bradford City entered into discussions with him regarding a new contract. Ahead of the 2025–26 season, Richgards missed pre-season due to injury. In July 2025 he signed a new one-year contract with the club. Later that month he returned to training, although by the end of August he had not returned to first-team play. In September he played in a behind-closed-doors 'bounce' match to assist his return to fitness. He made his first appearance of the 2025–26 season in October 2025 in the EFL Trophy.

=== Crawley Town ===
On 16 January 2026, Richards moved to League Two club Crawley Town for an undisclosed fee, signing an 18-month contract.

== Style of play ==
As of November 2024, Richards was primarily playing for Bradford City as a left wing back, having also played in the centre of defence. Bradford City manager Graham Alexander said Richards needed confidence in his new role as a wing back.

== Career statistics ==
As of match played on 21 November 2026

Appearances and goals by club, season and competition
Club	Season	League			FA Cup		EFL Cup		Other		Total	
Club	Season	Division	Apps	Goals	Apps	Goals	Apps	Goals	Apps	Goals	Apps	Goals
Wolverhampton Wanderers	2019–20	Premier League	0	0	0	0	0	0	4 (Note: Appearances in EFL Trophy)	0	4	0
Wolverhampton Wanderers	2020–21	Premier League	0	0	0	0	0	0	3	0	3	0
Wolverhampton Wanderers	2021–22	Premier League	0	0	0	0	0	0	2	0	2	0
Wolverhampton Wanderers	2022–23	Premier League	0	0	0	0	0	0	0	0	0	0
Wolverhampton Wanderers	Total		0	0	0	0	0	0	9	0	9	0
Harrogate Town (loan)	2021–22	League Two	8	0	0	0	0	0	0	0	8	0
Harrogate Town (loan)	2022–23	League Two	9	0	0	0	1	0	3	0	13	0
Bradford City	2023–24	League Two	26	0	0	0	0	0	4	1	30	1
Bradford City	2024–25	League Two	22	2	1	0	1	0	4	0	28	2
Bradford City	2025–26	League One	0	0	1	0	0	0	3	0	4	0
Bradford City	Total		48	2	2	0	1	0	11	1	62	3
Crawley Town	2025–26	League Two	13	0	0	0	0	0	0	0	13	0
Crawley Town	2026–27	League Two	8	0	1	0	0	0	2	0	11	0
Crawley Town	Total		21	0	1	0	0	0	2	0	24	0
Career total			86	2	3	0	2	0	25	1	116	3
