= 2023–24 Bradford City A.F.C. season =

121st season in existence of Bradford City AFC

Bradford City
2023–24 season
- Chairman: Stefan Rupp
- Manager: Mark Hughes (until 4 October); Kevin McDonald (caretaker - 4 Oct until 31 Oct); Mark Trueman (caretaker - 31 Oct until 6 Nov); Graham Alexander (from 6 November)
- Stadium: Valley Parade
- League Two: 9th
- FA Cup: First round
- EFL Cup: Third round
- EFL Trophy: Semi-final
Home colours	Away colours

The 2023–24 season is the 121st season in the existence of Bradford City and their fifth consecutive season in League Two. In addition to the league the club are also participating in the FA Cup, the EFL Cup, and the EFL Trophy.

== Current squad ==
As of 21 February 2024

No.	Name	Position	Nationality	Place of birth	Date of birth (age)	Previous club	Date signed	Fee	Contract end
Goalkeepers
1	Sam Walker	GK	(England)	Gravesend	2 October 1991 (age 35)	Charlton Athletic	11 January 2024	Free	30 June 2025
13	Colin Doyle	GK	(Republic of Ireland)	Cork	12 June 1985 (age 41)	(Scotland) Kilmarnock	1 July 2022	Free	30 June 2024
29	Heath Richardson	GK	(England)	Norfolk	26 January 2004 (age 22)	Academy	1 July 2022	Trainee	30 June 2024
40	Zachariah Hadi	GK	(England)			Academy	21 February 2024	Trainee	30 June 2024
Defenders
2	Brad Halliday	RB	(England)	Redcar	10 July 1995 (age 31)	Fleetwood Town	10 July 2022	Free	30 June 2024
3	Liam Ridehalgh	LB	(England)	Halifax	20 April 1991 (age 35)	Tranmere Rovers	1 July 2021	Free	30 June 2024
4	Ash Taylor	CB	(Wales)	Bromborough	2 September 1990 (age 36)	(Scotland) Kilmarnock	1 July 2023	Free	30 June 2025
5	Matthew Platt	CB	(England)	Knowsley	3 October 1997 (age 29)	Barrow	1 July 2022	Free	30 June 2024
15	Sam Stubbs	CB	(England)	Liverpool	20 November 1998 (age 27)	Exeter City	31 January 2023	Free	30 June 2024
18	Ciaran Kelly	CB	(Republic of Ireland)	Lucan	4 July 1998 (age 28)	(Republic of Ireland) Bohemian	1 January 2023	Free	30 June 2025
22	Daniel Oyegoke	RB	(England)	Barnet	3 January 2003 (age 23)	Brentford	1 July 2023	Loan	31 May 2024
31	Jonathan Tomkinson	CB	(United States)	Plano	11 April 2002 (age 24)	Norwich City	6 September 2023	Loan	31 May 2024
32	Lewis Richards	LB	(Republic of Ireland)	Liverpool	15 October 2001 (age 25)	Wolverhampton Wanderers	18 August 2023	Undisclosed	30 June 2025
Midfielders
6	Richard Smallwood	CM	(England)	Redcar	29 December 1990 (age 35)	Hull City	1 July 2022	Free	30 June 2024
7	Jamie Walker	AM	(Scotland)	Edinburgh	25 June 1993 (age 33)	(Scotland) Heart of Midlothian	1 July 2022	Free	30 June 2024
10	Alex Pattison	CM	(England)	Darlington	6 September 1997 (age 29)	Harrogate Town	1 July 2023	Free	30 June 2026
11	Alex Gilliead	CM	(England)	Shotley Bridge	11 February 1996 (age 30)	Scunthorpe United	1 July 2021	Free	30 June 2025
23	Bobby Pointon	AM	(England)	Bradford	4 January 2004 (age 22)	Academy	1 July 2023	Trainee	30 June 2024
26	Kevin McDonald	DM	(Scotland)	Carnoustie	4 November 1988 (age 38)	Exeter City	1 July 2023	Free	30 June 2025
39	Gabriel Wadsworth	CM	(England)			Academy	21 July 2023	Trainee	30 June 2024
Forwards
8	Calum Kavanagh	CF	(Republic of Ireland)	(Wales) Cardiff	5 September 2003 (age 23)	Middlesbrough	1 February 2024	Undisclosed	30 June 2026
9	Andy Cook	CF	(England)	Bishop Auckland	18 October 1990 (age 36)	Mansfield Town	1 July 2021	Free	30 June 2026
12	Clarke Oduor	LW	(Kenya)	Siaya	25 June 1999 (age 27)	Barnsley	1 July 2023	Free	30 June 2026
14	Tyler Smith	CF	(England)	Sheffield	4 December 1998 (age 27)	Hull City	1 July 2023	Free	30 June 2026
20	Harry Chapman	LW	(England)	Hartlepool	5 November 1997 (age 29)	Blackburn Rovers	1 July 2022	Free	30 June 2024
27	Matt Derbyshire	CF	(England)	Great Harwood	14 April 1986 (age 40)	(India) NorthEast United	9 January 2023	Free	30 June 2024
28	Jake Young	CF	(England)	Huddersfield	22 July 2001 (age 25)	Forest Green Rovers	1 July 2022	Undisclosed	30 June 2025
33	Adam Wilson	LW	(England)	Ashington	10 April 2000 (age 26)	The New Saints	28 August 2023	Undisclosed	30 June 2026
36	Tyreik Wright	RW	(Republic of Ireland)	Ovens	22 September 2001 (age 25)	Plymouth Argyle	15 January 2024	Loan	31 May 2024
Out on Loan
17	Luke Hendrie	RB	(England)	Leeds	27 August 1994 (age 32)	Hartlepool United	31 January 2022	Free	30 June 2024
19	Vadaine Oliver	CF	(England)	Sheffield	21 October 1991 (age 35)	Gillingham	10 July 2022	Free	30 June 2025
21	Timi Odusina	CB	(England)	Croydon	28 October 1999 (age 27)	Hartlepool United	1 July 2022	Undisclosed	30 June 2025
25	Harvey Rowe	CM	(England)		4 October 2003 (age 23)	Academy	1 July 2023	Trainee	30 June 2024
38	Freddy Jeffreys	CM	(England)	Leeds	25 August 2005 (age 21)	Academy	9 October 2023	Trainee	30 June 2024
	Finn Cousin-Dawson	RB	(Northern Ireland)	Stockton-on-Tees	4 July 2002 (age 24)	Academy	1 July 2020	Trainee	30 June 2024

== Transfers ==
=== In ===
Date	Pos	Player	Transferred from	Fee	Ref
1 July 2023	DM	Kevin McDonald (SCO)	Exeter City (ENG)	Free transfer	
1 July 2023	LW	Clarke Oduor (KEN)	Barnsley (ENG)	Free transfer	
1 July 2023	CM	Alex Pattison (ENG)	Harrogate Town (ENG)	Free transfer	
1 July 2023	CF	Tyler Smith (ENG)	Hull City (ENG)	Free transfer	
1 July 2023	CB	Ash Taylor (WAL)	Kilmarnock (SCO)	Free transfer	
18 August 2023	LB	Lewis Richards (IRL)	Wolverhampton Wanderers (ENG)	Undisclosed	
28 August 2023	LW	Adam Wilson (ENG)	The New Saints (ENG)	Undisclosed	
11 January 2024	GK	Sam Walker (ENG)	Charlton Athletic (ENG)	Free transfer	
1 February 2024	CF	Calum Kavanagh (IRL)	Middlesbrough (ENG)	Undisclosed	

=== Out ===
Date	Pos	Player	Transferred to	Fee	Ref
14 June 2023	LB	Matty Foulds (ENG)	Harrogate Town (ENG)	Undisclosed	
30 June 2023	CM	Adam Clayton (ENG)	Rochdale (ENG)	Released	
30 June 2023	LW	Abo Eisa (ENG)	Grimsby Town (ENG)	Released	
30 June 2023	CF	Cole Roberts (ENG)	Free agent	Released	
30 June 2023	AM	Kian Scales (ENG)	Scunthorpe United (ENG)	Released	
30 June 2023	DM	Yann Songo'o (CMR)	Morecambe (ENG)	Released	
30 June 2023	RB	Oscar Threlkeld (ENG)	Morecambe (ENG)	Released	
30 June 2023	CM	Jack Wilson (ENG)	Brighouse Town (ENG)	Released	
30 June 2023	AM	Charlie Wood (ENG)	Free agent	Released	
11 September 2023	CM	Jay Tinsdale (ENG)	Sheffield United (ENG)	Free transfer	
1 January 2024	DM	Ryan East (ENG)	Rochdale (ENG)	Free transfer	
11 January 2024	GK	Harry Lewis (ENG)	Carlisle United (ENG)	Undisclosed	
18 January 2024	RM	Emmanuel Osadebe (IRL)	Forest Green Rovers (ENG)	Undisclosed	

=== Loaned in ===
Date	Pos	Player	Loaned from	Fee	Ref
1 July 2023	RB	Daniel Oyegoke (ENG)	Brentford (ENG)	End of season	
1 September 2023	LW	Chisom Afoka (ENG)	Aston Villa (ENG)	3 January 2024 (Note: Afoka returned to parent club Aston Villa early from his season-long loan.)	
1 September 2023	SS	Rayhaan Tulloch (ENG)	West Bromwich Albion (ENG)	1 February 2024 (Note: Tulloch returned to parent club West Brom early from his season-long loan.)	
6 September 2023	CB	Jonathan Tomkinson (USA)	Norwich City (ENG)	End of season	
15 January 2024	RW	Tyreik Wright (IRL)	Plymouth Argyle (ENG)	End of season	

=== Loaned out ===
Date	Pos	Player	Loaned to	Date until	Ref
7 July 2023	RB	Finn Cousin-Dawson (NIR)	Blyth Spartans (ENG)	End of season	
2 August 2023	CF	Jake Young (ENG)	Swindon Town (ENG)	2 January 2024 (Note: On 2 January, Young was recalled from his season-long loan at Swindon early.)	
4 August 2023	CF	Isaac Robinson (ENG)	Farsley Celtic (ENG)	End of season	
14 August 2023	DM	Ryan East (ENG)	Rochdale (ENG)	1 January 2024 (Note: On 22 December, it was announced East would join Rochdale permanently in January.)	
1 September 2023	RB	Luke Hendrie (ENG)	Hartlepool United (ENG)	End of season	
15 September 2023	CB	Timi Odusina (ENG)	Woking (ENG)	End of season (Note: On 5 January, Odusina's loan at Woking was extended until the end of season.)	
25 October 2023	CF	Dylan Youmbi (ENG)	Farsley Celtic (ENG)	15 February 2024	
14 November 2023	DF	Noah Wadsworth (ENG)	Farsley Celtic (ENG)	16 February 2024	
12 January 2024	DM	Harvey Rowe (ENG)	Farsley Celtic (ENG)	End of season	
17 January 2024	CF	Vadaine Oliver (ENG)	Stevenage (ENG)	End of season	
15 February 2024	CF	Dylan Youmbi (ENG)	Scunthorpe United (ENG)	End of season	

== Pre-season and friendlies ==
On 15 June, Bradford City announced their pre-season schedule, with matches against Bury, Eldense, Bradford (Park Avenue), Hull City, Middlesbrough and Rochdale. In July, it was confirmed that Getafe replaced Eldense as pre-season opposition.

Win Draw Loss Fixtures

8 July 2023 Friendly	Bury	0–6	Bradford City	Bury
15:00 BST		Report	Pattison 7'; Cook 12'; Osadebe 27'; Ridehalgh 28'; Derbyshire 53'; Walker 88'	Stadium: Gigg Lane

14 July 2023 Friendly	Getafe	3–0	Bradford City	Oliva, Spain
17:00 BST	Mayoral 3'; Iglesias 37'; Altimira 71'	Report		Stadium: Oliva Nova Sports Center

18 July 2023 Friendly	Bolton Wanderers	5–2	Bradford City	Bolton, England
12:00 BST				Stadium: Eddie Davies Academy (Behind Closed Doors)

19 July 2023 Friendly	Bradford (Park Avenue)	1–1	Bradford City	Bradford
19:30 BST	Longbottom 58'	Report	Youmbi 44'	Stadium: Horsfall Stadium; Attendance: 2,354

22 July 2023 Friendly	Bradford City	1–1	Hull City	Bradford
15:00 BST	Stubbs 90'	Report	Slater 22'	Stadium: Valley Parade; Attendance: 3,411

26 July 2023 Friendly	Bradford City	3–3	Middlesbrough	Bradford
19:30 BST	Cook 12', 41', 58'	Report	Silvera 4'; Gilbert 29' (pen.); Nkrumah 90'	Stadium: Valley Parade; Attendance: 4,378 (1,413 Middlesbrough supporters)

29 July 2023 Friendly	Rochdale	1–0	Bradford City	Rochdale
15:00 BST	Rodney 46'	Report		Stadium: Spotland Stadium; Attendance: 1,971 (697 away supporters)

== Competitions ==
=== Overall record ===
Competition	First match	Last match	Starting round	Final position	Record							
Competition	First match	Last match	Starting round	Final position	Pld	W	D	L	GF	GA	GD	Win %
League Two	5 Aug 2023		Matchday 1		45	18	12	15	57	58	−1	40.00
FA Cup	4 Nov 2023	4 November 2023	First round	First round	1	0	0	1	1	2	−1	0.00
EFL Cup	8 Aug 2023	28 September 2023	First round	Third round	3	0	2	1	2	4	−2	0.00
EFL Trophy	10 Oct 2023		Group stage		6	6	0	0	16	2	+14	100.00
Total					55	24	14	17	76	66	+10	43.64

Last updated: 17 February 2024
Source: Soccerway

=== League Two ===
==== League table ====
Pos	Team	Pld	W	D	L	GF	GA	GD	Pts	Promotion, qualification or relegation
6	Crewe Alexandra	46	19	14	13	69	65	+4	71	Qualified for League Two play-offs
7	Crawley Town (O, P)	46	21	7	18	73	67	+6	70	Qualified for League Two play-offs
8	Barrow	46	18	15	13	62	56	+6	69	
9	Bradford City	46	19	12	15	61	59	+2	69	
10	AFC Wimbledon	46	17	14	15	64	51	+13	65	
11	Walsall	46	18	11	17	69	73	−4	65	
12	Gillingham	46	18	10	18	46	57	−11	64	

Source: EFL Official Website
Rules for classification: 1) Points; 2) Goal difference; 3) Number of goals scored; 4) Head-to-head results; 5) Wins; 6) Away goals; 7) Penalty points (sec 9.5); 8) 12-point sending off offences
(O) Play-off winners; (P) Promoted

==== Results summary ====
Overall								Home						Away					
Pld	W	D	L	GF	GA	GD	Pts	W	D	L	GF	GA	GD	W	D	L	GF	GA	GD
46	19	12	15	61	59	+2	69	9	8	6	29	28	+1	10	4	9	32	31	+1

Last updated: 23 April 2024.
Source: Soccerway

==== Results by round ====
Round	1	2	3	4	5	6	7	8	9	10	11	12	13	14	15	16	17	18	19	20	22	23	24	25	26	27	28	21^{1}	30	30	32	33	34	29^{2}	37	38	39	36^{4}	40	41	42	43	44	45	35^{3}	46
Ground	A	H	A	A	H	A	H	H	A	H	A	H	A	H	A	A	H	A	H	A	A	A	H	H	A	H	A	H	A	H	A	H	H	H	A	H	H	H	A	H	A	H	A	A	A	H
Result	L	W	D	L	W	D	D	D	W	L	L	W	W	D	L	L	L	L	W	W	W	W	D	D	L	L	D	D	L	D	W	W	W	D	W	L	L	L	L	W	D	W	W	W	W	W
Position	18	11	13	18	12	15	16	17	11	14	18	14	11	11	15	16	18	18	14	14	14	10	10	11	13	14	15	16	18	18	14	13	13	16	13	13	15	17	17	14	14	14	13	10	9	9

Updated to match(es) played on 23 April 2024. Source: Soccerway
A = Away; H = Home; W = Win; D = Draw; L = Loss; P = Postponed
Notes:
- ^{1} Matchday 21 (vs Salford City) was postponed due to a waterlogged pitch.
- ^{2} Matchday 29 (vs Doncaster Rovers) was postponed due to a frozen pitch.
- ^{3} Matchday 35 (vs Barrow) was postponed after the referee deemed the pitch to be unplayable.
- ^{4} Matchday 36 (vs Notts County) was postponed due to a waterlogged pitch.

==== Matches ====
On 22 June, the EFL League Two fixtures were released.

Win Draw Loss Fixtures

5 August 2023 1	Crawley Town	1–0	Bradford City	Crawley
15:00 BST	Gordon (yellow card) 11'; Wright 14'; Kelly (yellow card) 15'; Darcy (yellow card) 30'; Conroy (yellow card) 72'; Orsi (yellow card) 90'; Henry (yellow card) 90+3'	Report	Kelly (yellow card) 12'; Oyegoke (yellow card) 31' (yellow-red card) 41'; Halliday (yellow card) 64'; Walker (yellow card) 82'	Stadium: Broadfield Stadium; Attendance: 3,883; Referee: Thomas Parsons

12 August 2023 2	Bradford City	2–1	Colchester United	Bradford
15:00 BST	Walker (yellow card) 7'; Oduor 45'; Platt (yellow card) 45+5'; Pattison 58'	Report	Taylor 9' (yellow card) 57'; Dallison (yellow card) 40'	Stadium: Valley Parade; Attendance: 17,177; Referee: Marc Edwards

15 August 2023 3	Stockport County	1–1	Bradford City	Edgeley
19:45 BST	Knoyle (yellow card) 20'; Olaofe 80'; Croasdale (yellow card) 87'	Report	Gilliead (yellow card) 20'; Pattison 47'; Oyegoke (yellow card) 52'; Platt (yellow card) 52'	Stadium: Edgeley Park; Attendance: 9,296; Referee: Seb Stockbridge

19 August 2023 4	Morecambe	3–0	Bradford City	Morecambe
15:00 BST	Songo'o (yellow card) 12'; Mellon 22', 86' (pen.) (yellow card) 90+6'; Mayor (yellow card) 31'; McKiernan 68'	Report	Smallwood (yellow card) 22'; Pattison (yellow card) 25'; Stubbs (yellow card) 88'	Stadium: Mazuma Stadium; Attendance: 4,713; Referee: Lewis Smith

26 August 2023 5	Bradford City	1–0	Crewe Alexandra	Bradford
15:00 BST	Walker 43'; Kelly (yellow card) 45+1'; Richards (yellow card) 71'	Report		Stadium: Valley Parade; Attendance: 16,736; Referee: Darren Drysdale

2 September 2023 6	Mansfield Town	0–0	Bradford City	Mansfield
15:00 BST	Macdonald (yellow card) 68'; Gale (yellow card) 75'	Report	Smallwood (yellow card) 23'; Walker (yellow card) 55'; Platt (yellow card) 81'; Oyegoke (yellow card) 90+4'	Stadium: Field Mill; Attendance: 8,525; Referee: Leigh Doughty

9 September 2023 7	Bradford City	1–1	Grimsby Town	Bradford
12:30 BST	Kelly (yellow card) 6'; Gilliead 89'; Afoka (yellow card) 90+3'	Report	Eisa (yellow card) 8'; Rodgers (yellow card) 32'; Amos (yellow card) 34'; Rose 43'; Conteh (yellow card) 53'	Stadium: Valley Parade; Attendance: 18,879; Referee: Sam Purkiss

16 September 2023 8	Bradford City	1–1	Harrogate Town	Bradford
15:00 BST	Walker 90+5'	Report	Odoh (yellow card) 33'; Daly 78'; Oxley (yellow card) 90+2'	Stadium: Valley Parade; Attendance: 17,283; Referee: Sunny Gill

23 September 2023 9	Newport County	1–4	Bradford City	Newport
15:00 BST	Bogle 35'; Evans (yellow card) 72'; Drysdale (yellow card) 85'	Report	Cook 14', 29', 90+2'; Tulloch 26'; Ridehalgh (yellow card) 84'	Stadium: Rodney Parade; Attendance: 4,087; Referee: Andy Davies

30 September 2023 10	Bradford City	1–3	Walsall	Bradford
15:00 BST	Cook 23' (pen.); Tulloch (yellow card) 55'	Report	Riley (yellow card) 22'; Gordon 26' (yellow card) 43'; Oteh 45+3'; Draper 56'; Tierney (yellow card) 76'; Williams (yellow card) 79'	Stadium: Valley Parade; Attendance: 17,038; Referee: Scott Jackson

3 October 2023 11	Tranmere Rovers	2–1	Bradford City	Birkenhead
19:45 BST	Hendry 24'; Saunders (yellow card) 32'; O'Connor (yellow card) 39'; Walker (yellow card) 49'; Hawkes (penalty missed) 66'; Morris 83'	Report	Platt (yellow card) 14'; Cook 55'; McDonald (yellow card) 64'; Ridehalgh (yellow card) 78'	Stadium: Prenton Park; Attendance: 5,672; Referee: Scott Oldham

7 October 2023 12	Bradford City	1–0	Swindon Town	Bradford
15:00 BST	Pointon 50'; Walker (yellow card) 60'; Halliday (yellow card) 76'; Smallwood (yellow card) 89'	Report	Khan (yellow card) 42'; Hutton (yellow card) 65'; Austin (yellow card) 76'	Stadium: Valley Parade; Attendance: 16,788; Referee: Christopher Pollard

14 October 2023 13	AFC Wimbledon	0–1	Bradford City	Wimbledon
10:00 BST	Davison (yellow card) 17'; Lewis (yellow card) 58'; Ogundere (yellow card) 70'	Report	Platt (yellow card) 7'; Smallwood (yellow card) 31'; Osadebe 62'	Stadium: Plough Lane; Attendance: 8,270; Referee: Scott Simpson

21 October 2023 14	Bradford City	1–1	Wrexham	Bradford
15:00 BST	Smallwood (yellow card) 6'; Walker (yellow card) 26'; Pointon (yellow card) 37'; Wilson 85'	Report	Mullin (yellow card) 2' (goal) 68' (Barnett); Jones (yellow card) 29'	Stadium: Valley Parade; Attendance: 21,552; Referee: Ross Joyce

24 October 2023 15	Milton Keynes Dons	4–1	Bradford City	Milton Keynes
10:00 BST	Tomlinson 4'; Payne 31'; Dean 59'; Gilbey 90'	Report	Gilliead 17'; Taylor (yellow card) 30'; McDonald (yellow card) 39'; Ridehalgh (yellow card) 52'; Stubbs (yellow card) 70'	Stadium: Stadium MK; Attendance: 5,510; Referee: Matthew Corlett

28 October 2023 16	Sutton United	2–1	Bradford City	Sutton
15:00 GMT	Coley 4'; Goodliffe (yellow card) 73'; Smith (yellow card) 81'; Beautyman 87'	Report	Cook 57' (yellow card) 66'	Stadium: Gander Green Lane; Attendance: 2,866; Referee: Oliver Langford

11 November 2023 17	Bradford City	1–2	Barrow	Bradford
15:00 GMT	Smith 33'; Halliday (yellow card) 50'; Cook (yellow card) 77'	Report	Telford 1'; Spence (yellow card) 38'; White (yellow card) 45+5'; Ray 77'	Stadium: Valley Parade; Attendance: 17,247; Referee: David Webb

18 November 2023 18	Notts County	4–2	Bradford City	Nottingham
12:30 GMT	McGoldrick 5' (yellow card) 69'; Langstaff 36', 42'; Crowley 45+2'; Adebayo-Rowling (yellow card) 77'; Baldwin (yellow card) 90+3'	Report	Brindley 57' (o.g.); Walker 75'	Stadium: Meadow Lane; Attendance: 11,909; Referee: Tom Reeves

25 November 2023 19	Bradford City	1–0	Accrington Stanley	Bradford
15:00 GMT	Smith 58' (yellow card) 66'; Taylor (yellow card) 80'; Chapman (yellow card) 90+5'	Report	Hills (yellow card) 32'; Rich-Baghuelou (yellow card) 47'; Shipley (yellow card) 57'; Whalley (yellow card) 76'	Stadium: Valley Parade; Attendance: 16,548; Referee: Keith Stroud

28 November 2023 20	Forest Green Rovers	0–3	Bradford City	Nailsworth
19:45 GMT			Matthew Platt; Andy Cook pen; Jamie Walker	Stadium: The New Lawn; Attendance: 1,462; Referee: Simon Mather

16 December 2023 22	Gillingham	0–2	Bradford City	Gillingham
15:00 GMT	Bonne (yellow card) 55'; Ehmer (yellow card) 57'; Masterson (yellow card) 59'	Report	Walker 31'; Platt (yellow card) 50'; Gilliead (yellow card) 51'; Kelly (yellow card) 55'; Halliday (yellow card) 60'; Cook 75'; Richards (yellow card) 86'	Stadium: Priestfield Stadium; Attendance: 4,874; Referee: Scott Jackson

22 December 2023 23	Doncaster Rovers	1–3	Bradford City	Doncaster
19:45 GMT	Ironside 7'; Senior (yellow card) 65'	Report	Cook 27', 85'; Smith 43'; Richards (yellow card) 90+5'	Stadium: Eco-Power Stadium; Attendance: 8,695; Referee: Edward Duckworth

26 December 2023 24	Bradford City	2–2	Morecambe	Bradford
15:00 GMT	Cook (yellow card) 56'; Oduor 59'; Tomkinson (yellow card) 80'; Halliday 83'	Report	Connolly 3'; Mckiernan 18', (yellow card) 58'; Slew (yellow card) 78'; Tutonda (yellow card) 80'	Stadium: Valley Parade; Attendance: 18,540; Referee: Darren Drysdale

29 December 2023 25	Bradford City	0–0	Stockport County	Bradford
19:45 GMT	Gilliead (yellow card) 50'; Oduor (yellow card) 70'	Report	Touray (yellow card) 45+1'; Wright (yellow card) 76'	Stadium: Valley Parade; Attendance: 9,657; Referee: Lewis Smith

1 January 2024 26	Crewe Alexandra	1–0	Bradford City	Crewe
15:00 GMT	Long 13' (pen.); Rowe (yellow card) 39'; Booth (yellow card) 69'; Billington (yellow card) 77'; Demetriou (yellow card) 87'; Baker-Richardson (yellow card) 90+5'	Report	Smallwood (yellow card) 38'; Halliday (yellow card) 90+1'	Stadium: Gresty Road; Attendance: 5,529; Referee: Peter Wright

6 January 2024 27	Bradford City	2–4	Crawley Town	Bradford
15:00 GMT	Ridehalgh 61'; Cook (penalty missed) 79'; Addai 79' (o.g.); Derbyshire (yellow card) 90+7'	Report	Orsi 12', 90+7' (pen.); Tsaroulla (yellow card) 16'; Maguire (yellow card) 19'; Campbell 85'; Lolos 90+10'	Stadium: Valley Parade; Attendance: 16,699; Referee: Neil Hair

13 January 2024 28	Colchester United	1-1	Bradford City	Colchester
15:00 GMT	Hopper 59'	Report	Cook 35'	Stadium: Colchester Community Stadium; Attendance: 4,625; Referee: Scott Simpson

23 January 2024 21	Bradford City	1–1	Salford City	Bradford
19:45 GMT	Halliday 20'	Report	Watt (yellow card) 13'; Watson 14'	Stadium: Valley Parade; Attendance: 16,549; Referee: Martin Woods
Note: Fixture was originally scheduled for 9 December, but was postponed due to a waterlogged pitch.

27 January 2024 30	Swindon Town	2–0	Bradford City	Swindon
15:00 GMT	Austin 17' (pen.); Devoy 45+2'; Kokolo (yellow card) 45+4'; Khan (yellow card) 58'	Report	Stubbs (yellow card) 49'; Smallwood (yellow card) 55'	Stadium: County Ground; Attendance: 7,878; Referee: Geoff Eltringham

3 February 2024 31	Bradford City	0–0	AFC Wimbledon	Bradford
15:00 GMT	Smallwood (yellow card) 38'; McDonald (yellow card) 80'; Kavanagh (yellow card) 90+1'	Report	Brown (yellow card) 24'; Ogundere (yellow card) 45'; Chaaban (yellow card) 45+2'; Little (yellow card) 77'	Stadium: Valley Parade; Referee: Ross Joyce

10 February 2024 32	Wrexham	0–1	Bradford City	Wrexham
15:00 BST		Report	Platt (yellow card) 25'; Gilliead (yellow card) 45+2'; Tomkinson (yellow card) 64'; Cook (penalty missed) 83, 90'	Stadium: Racecourse Ground; Attendance: 12,447; Referee: Ben Speedie

13 February 2024 33	Bradford City	4–0	Milton Keynes Dons	Bradford
19:45 GMT	Platt 14'; Kavanagh 36'; McDonald (yellow card) 44'; Gilliead (yellow card) 45+3'; Cook 49' (yellow card) 76'; Oduor 51'; Smallwood (yellow card) 59'; Tomkinson (yellow card) 71'	Report	Robson (yellow card) 90'	Stadium: Valley Parade; Attendance: 16,234; Referee: Ollie Yates

17 February 2024 34	Bradford City	1–0	Sutton United	Bradford
15:00 GMT	Tomkinson (yellow card) 46'; Kavanagh 54'	Report	Angol (yellow card) 40'; Bouzanis (yellow card) 89'	Stadium: Valley Parade; Attendance: 16,697; Referee: Marc Edwards

5 March 2024 29	Bradford City	1–1	Doncaster Rovers	Bradford
19:45 GMT	Oduor (yellow card) 17'; Stubbs (yellow card) 28'; McDonald (yellow card) 32'; Tomkinson (yellow card) 61'; Smith 84'; Wilson (yellow card) 90+2'	Report	Maxwell (yellow card) 30'; Bailey (yellow card) 41'; Biggins (yellow card) 42'; Molyneux 45'; Lo-Tutala (yellow card) 90+4'	Stadium: Valley Parade; Attendance: 17,138; Referee: Leigh Doughty
Note: Fixture was originally scheduled for 20 January, but was postponed due to a frozen pitch.

9 March 2024 37	Accrington Stanley	0–3	Bradford City	Accrington
15:00 GMT	O'Brien (yellow card) 79'	Report	Wright (yellow card) 5' (goal) 12', 23'; Cook 38'	Stadium: Crown Ground; Attendance: 4,099; Referee: Paul Howard

12 March 2024 38	Bradford City	0–2	Forest Green Rovers	Bradford
19:45 GMT	Kelly (yellow card) 90+2'	Report	Doidge 2', 90+3' (pen.); Robson (yellow card) 56'	Stadium: Valley Parade; Attendance: 15,418; Referee: Simon Mather

16 March 2024 39	Bradford City	1–5	Mansfield Town	Bradford
15:00 GMT	Walker (yellow card) 8'; Cook 72'; Tomkinson (yellow card) 90+1'	Report	Cargill 10'; Akins 14'; Keillor-Dunn 18', (yellow card) 20'; Swan 45+2'; Lewis 86'; Reed (yellow card) 90+2'	Stadium: Valley Parade; Attendance: 16,496; Referee: Martin Coy

19 March 2024 36	Bradford City	0–3	Notts County	Bradford
19:45 GMT	Gilliead (yellow card) 36'; Halliday (yellow card) 56'; Smallwood (yellow card) 82'; Wright (yellow card) 90'; McDonald (yellow card) 90+3'	Report	Langstaff 12'; Jatta 57' 90+4'; Nemane (yellow card) 90+1'	Stadium: Valley Parade; Attendance: 17,983; Referee: Ben Toner
Note: Fixture was originally scheduled for 2 March, but was postponed due to a waterlogged pitch.

23 March 2024 40	Harrogate Town	3–0	Bradford City	Harrogate
13:00 GMT	March 21'; Dooley (yellow card) 57'; Thomson 73' (pen.); Oyegoke 79' (o.g.)	Report	Wright (yellow card) 74'	Stadium: Wetherby Road; Attendance: 3,905; Referee: Sam Purkiss

29 March 2024 41	Bradford City	2–0	Tranmere Rovers	Bradford
15:00 GMT	Platt (yellow card) 48'; Smallwood (yellow card) 53'; Kavanagh 64'; Pointon 69'	Report	Pike (yellow card) 26'; Norris (yellow card) 50'; Apter (yellow card) 63'	Stadium: Valley Parade; Attendance: 18,009; Referee: Richie Watkins

1 April 2024 42	Grimsby Town	1–1	Bradford City	Cleethorpes
13:00 BST	Hume (yellow card) 37' (yellow-red card) 90+1'; Thompson 55'; Andrews (yellow card) 85'; Rodgers (yellow card) 90+2'	Report	Oyegoke (yellow card) 53'; Kavanagh (yellow card) 56'; Platt (yellow card) 67'; Wright (yellow card) 80'; Kelly (yellow card) 84'; Smallwood 90+3' (pen.)	Stadium: Blundell Park; Attendance: 6,711; Referee: Matthew Corlett

6 April 2024 43	Bradford City	1–0	Gillingham	Bradford
15:00 BST	Halliday 43'; Oyegoke (yellow card) 67'	Report	Lapslie (yellow card) 66'; Ehmer (yellow card) 68'	Stadium: Valley Parade; Attendance: 16,735; Referee: Edward Duckworth

13 April 2024 44	Salford City	1–2	Bradford City	Kersal
15:00 BST	Hendry 18'; Chesters (yellow card) 33'; Lund (yellow card) 36'; Smith (yellow card) 87'	Report	Platt (yellow card) 22'; Kavanagh 45+3', (yellow card) 77'; Tomkinson (yellow card) 83'; Halliday 86'	Stadium: Moor Lane; Attendance: 3,517; Referee: Jacob Miles

20 April 2024 45	Walsall	2–3	Bradford City	Bescot
15:00 BST	Stirk 7'; Faal 16'; Allen (yellow card) 32'; Knowles (yellow card) 90+5'	Report	Cook 19'; Walker 40', 53', (yellow card) 59' (yellow-red card) 68'; Kelly (yellow card) 45+1'; Wright (yellow card) 67'; Smallwood (yellow card) 90+5'	Stadium: Bescot Stadium; Attendance: 6,656; Referee: Adam Herczeg

23 April 2024 35	Barrow	1–2	Bradford City	Barrow-in-Furness
19:45 BST	Stockton (yellow card) 32'; Spence 59'; Stephenson (yellow card) 66'; Farman (yellow card) 90+3'	Report	Pointon 29', (yellow card) 50'; Oyegoke (yellow card) 54'; Smith 90'; Chapman (yellow card) 90+3'	Stadium: Holker Street; Attendance: 4,527; Referee: Ross Joyce
Note: Fixture was originally scheduled for 24 February, but was postponed due to the referee deeming the playing surface to be unplayable. Fixture was later postponed for a second time due to a waterlogged pitch.

27 April 2024 46	Bradford City	4–1	Newport County	Bradford
15:00 BST	Kavanagh 44'; Cook 45+1'; Pointon 44'; Walker 90+3'	Report		Stadium: Valley Parade; Attendance: 18,842; Referee: Thomas Kirk

=== FA Cup ===
Bradford were drawn at home to Wycombe Wanderers in the first round.

Win Draw Loss Fixtures

4 November 2023 First Round	Bradford City	1–2	Wycombe Wanderers	Bradford
15:00 GMT	Ridehalgh (yellow card) 22'; Stubbs (yellow card) 38'; Walker 64' (yellow card) 80'	Report	Phillips 18' (yellow card) 80'; Leahy (yellow card) 24'; Stubbs 35' (o.g.); Stryjek (yellow card) 85'; Hanlan (yellow card) 90+1'; De Barr (yellow card) 90+3'	Stadium: Valley Parade; Attendance: 3,642; Referee: Declan Bourne

=== EFL Cup ===
The Bantams were drawn away to Accrington Stanley in the first round, to Wrexham in the second round and at home against Middlesbrough in the third round.

Win Draw Loss Fixtures

8 August 2023 First round	Accrington Stanley	1–1 (1–4 p)	Bradford City	Accrington
19:45 BST	Coyle (yellow card) 32'; Whalley (yellow card) 39'; Andrews 66'; Hills (yellow card) 87'	Report	Pattison 45+1'; Halliday (yellow card) 60'; Stubbs (yellow card) 86'	Stadium: Crown Ground; Attendance: 2,368; Referee: Martin Coy
	Penalties
	Leigh (penalty scored); Nolan (penalty missed); Adedoyin (penalty missed)		Cook (penalty scored); Gilliead (penalty scored); Walker (penalty scored); Oduor (penalty scored)

29 August 2023 Second round	Wrexham	1–1 (3–4 p)	Bradford City	Wrexham
19:45 BST	McClean (yellow card) 67'; Boyle 72'	Report	Smith 3' (pen.); Pattison (yellow card) 45+4'; Platt (yellow card) 90+2'	Stadium: Racecourse Ground; Attendance: 9,816; Referee: Ben Speedie
	Penalties
	Young (penalty missed); Lee (penalty scored); Palmer (penalty scored); McClean (penalty scored); Jones (penalty missed)		Derbyshire (penalty scored); Smallwood (penalty scored); Wilson (penalty scored); Halliday (penalty scored); Oyegoke (penalty missed)

26 September 2023 Third round	Bradford City	0–2	Middlesbrough	Bradford
19:45 BST	Walker (yellow card) 38'; Pattison (yellow card) 89'	Report	Latte Lath 21'; Rogers 54'; Smith (yellow card) 85'	Stadium: Valley Parade; Attendance: 15,754; Referee: Tom Nield

=== EFL Trophy ===
The Group stage draw was finalised on 22 June 2023. After topping the group, they were drawn at home to Liverpool U21 in the second round, away to Derby County in the third round, then at home to Doncaster Rovers in the quarter-finals, and finally at home to Wycombe Wanderers in the semi-finals.

Pos	Div	Team	Pld	W	PW	PL	L	GF	GA	GD	Pts	Qualification
1	L2	Bradford City	3	3	0	0	0	10	2	+8	9	Advance to Round 2
2	L1	Barnsley	3	2	0	0	1	6	6	0	6	Advance to Round 2
3	ACA	Manchester City U21	3	0	1	0	2	3	8	−5	2	
4	L2	Grimsby Town	3	0	0	1	2	3	6	−3	1	

Updated to match(es) played on 31 October 2023. Source: EFL.com

Win Draw Loss Fixtures

10 October 2023 Group stage	Grimsby Town	1–2	Bradford City	Cleethorpes
19:30 BST	Pyke 18'; Rodgers (yellow card) 90+2'	Report	Kelly (yellow card) 3' (goal) 16'; Osadebe 48' (red card) 90+2'; McDonald (yellow card) 59'	Stadium: Blundell Park; Attendance: 747; Referee: Paul Howard

31 October 2023 Group stage	Bradford City	3–0	Manchester City U21	Bradford
19:45 BST	Chapman (yellow card) 11'; Smith 15', 36', 44'; Doyle (yellow card) 85'	Report		Stadium: Valley Parade; Attendance: 1,750; Referee: Ben Toner

21 November 2023 Group stage	Bradford City	5–1	Barnsley	Bradford
19:30 GMT	Platt 2'; Cook 17'; Smith 35'; Halliday (yellow card) 37'; Chapman (yellow card) 42'; Doyle (yellow card) 45'; Smallwood (yellow card) 55'; Richards 63'; Oduor 66'	Report	Yoganathan (yellow card) 13'; Dodgson (yellow card) 60'; Cotter 77'; Shepherd (red card) 90+4'	Stadium: Valley Parade; Attendance: 1,770; Referee: Will Finnie

5 December 2023 Second round	Bradford City	4–0	Liverpool U21	Bradford
19:30 GMT	Smith; Cook; Oliver; Smith			Stadium: Valley Parade; Attendance: 1,907; Referee: Adam Herczeg

9 January 2024 Third round	Derby County	0–1	Bradford City	Derby
19:00 GMT	Nelson (yellow card) 55'	Report	Ridehalgh (yellow card) 40'; Smallwood (yellow card) 58'; Stubbs 67'; Gilliead (yellow card) 76'	Stadium: Pride Park Stadium; Referee: Carl Brook

30 January 2024 Quarter-final	Bradford City	1–0	Doncaster Rovers	Bradford
TBC GMT	Chapman 58'	Report		Stadium: Valley Parade; Attendance: 3,086; Referee: Will Finnie

21 February 2024 Semi Finals	Bradford City	0–1	Wycombe Wanderers	Bradford
20:00 GMT	McDonald (yellow card) 90+5'	Report	Low (yellow card) 67'; Leahy (yellow card) 85'; Butcher 90+1'	Stadium: University of Bradford Stadium; Attendance: 6,903; Referee: Tom Reeves
