= Clarke Oduor =

Kenyan footballer (born 1999)

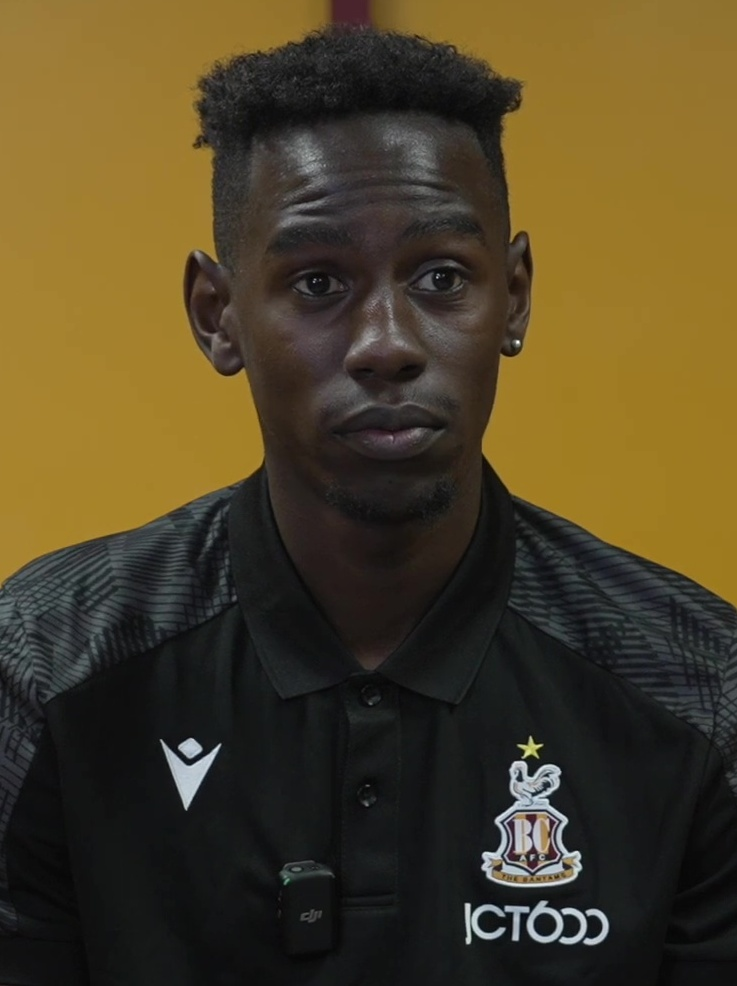
- Oduor with Bradford City in 2023

Personal information
- Full name: Clarke Sydney Omondi Oduor
- Date of birth: 25 June 1999 (age 27)
- Place of birth: Siaya, Kenya
- Height: 1.79 m (5 ft 10 in)
- Positions: Central midfielder; left-back

Team information
- Current team: Bohemians

Youth career
- 2010–2017: Leeds United

Senior career*
Years	Team	Apps	(Gls)
2017–2019	Leeds United	0	(0)
2019–2023	Barnsley	48	(1)
2022–2023	→ Hartlepool United (loan)	11	(1)
2023–2026	Bradford City	51	(4)
2025–2026	→ Grimsby Town (loan)	21	(0)
2026–	Bohemians	0	(0)

International career^{‡}
2020–	Kenya	4	(0)
- * Club domestic league appearances and goals as of 18:55, 13 November 2026 (UTC) ‡ National team caps and goals as of 18:55, 13 November 2026 (UTC)

Clarke Sydney Omondi Oduor (born 25 June 1999) is a Kenyan professional footballer who plays as a central midfielder or left-back for League of Ireland Premier Division club Bohemians, and the Kenya national team.

== Career ==
=== Leeds United ===
Oduor started his career at Leeds United's academy, signing a professional contract on 16 January 2017.

He made his professional debut on 6 January 2019, coming on as an 85th-minute substitute during a 2–1 defeat to Queens Park Rangers in the third round of the FA Cup.

On 17 February, Oduor signed a new contract with Leeds, extending his deal until the end of the 2019–20 season with the option of a further year.

Oduor featured regularly for Carlos Corberán's Leeds United under-23 side over the course of the 2018–19 season, showing his versatility by playing as left back, left wing back, winger and as a forward over the course of the year. With Oduor's help, Leeds won the PDL Northern League championship as well as the national PDL championship, beating Birmingham City in the final.

=== Barnsley ===
On 31 August 2019, Oduor signed a four-year deal to join EFL Championship side Barnsley.

On 7 December, Oduor made his league debut for Barnsley as a 93rd-minute substitute in the Championship. On 14 December, Oduor made his first league start for the side. On 26 December, he earned Man of the Match honours in a league match against West Bromwich Albion. He scored his first goal in the 91st minute of the last game of the 2019–20 season against Brentford to keep Barnsley in the Championship.

On 1 September 2022, Oduor signed for Hartlepool United on loan. He scored his first goal Hartlepool in a 2–1 defeat to Swindon Town.

=== Bradford City ===
Upon expiry of his contract at Barnsley, Oduor moved to EFL League Two side Bradford City on a three-year deal.

On 26 August 2025, Oduor signed for EFL League Two side Grimsby Town on a season-long loan from Bradford City. His first game was a substitute appearance against Manchester United in the EFL Cup, a match Grimsby won on penalties, with Odour being the only Grimsby player to miss his penalty; Grimsby were subsequently fined £10,000 as Oduor's registration had been received one minute past the deadline, rendering Oduor ineligible for that match.

He was released by Bradford City at the end of the 2025–26 season.

=== Bohemians ===
Having gone 6 months without a club, on 13 November 2026, it was announced that Oduor had signed for League of Ireland Premier Division club Bohemians on a one-year-contract ahead of the 2027 season.

== International career ==
Oduor was eligible for both the Kenyan national team and the England national team. He made his senior debut for Kenya in a 2–1 friendly win over Zambia on 9 October 2020.

== Style of play ==
Oduor is known for his versatility, being able to play as a winger on either flank or as a left back, left wing-back or left-sided forward. With Oduor style known for his pace, incisive footwork and his ability to both defend and attack.

== Career statistics ==
=== Club ===
As of matches played 15 May 2026

Appearances and goals by club, season and competition
Club	Season	League			FA Cup		League Cup		Other		Total	
Club	Season	Division	Apps	Goals	Apps	Goals	Apps	Goals	Apps	Goals	Apps	Goals
Leeds United	2018–19	Championship	0	0	1	0	0	0	0	0	1	0
Barnsley	2019–20	Championship	16	1	2	0	0	0	0	0	18	1
Barnsley	2020–21	Championship	11	0	0	0	2	0	0	0	13	0
Barnsley	2021–22	Championship	20	0	0	0	1	0	0	0	21	0
Barnsley	2022–23	League One	2	0	0	0	2	0	1	0	5	0
Barnsley	Total		49	1	2	0	5	0	1	0	57	1
Hartlepool United (loan)	2022–23	League Two	11	1	3	0	0	0	0	0	14	1
Bradford City	2023–24	League Two	32	3	0	0	2	0	6	1	41	4
Bradford City	2024–25	League Two	19	1	1	0	1	0	5	1	26	2
Bradford City	Total		51	4	1	0	3	0	11	2	67	6
Grimsby Town (loan)	2025–26	League Two	21	0	1	0	2	0	4	1	28	1
Bohemians	2027	LOI Premier Division	0	0	0	0	–		0	0	0	0
Total			132	6	8	0	10	0	16	3	166	9

=== International ===
As of match played on 7 June 2026

Appearances and goals by national team and year
National team	Year	Apps	Goals
Kenya
Kenya	2020	1	0
Kenya	2021	0	0
Kenya	2022	0	0
Kenya	2023	0	0
Kenya	2024	0	0
Kenya	2025	0	0
Kenya	2026	3	0
Total		4	0
