= Ciarán Kelly (footballer, born 1998) =

Irish footballer (born 1998)

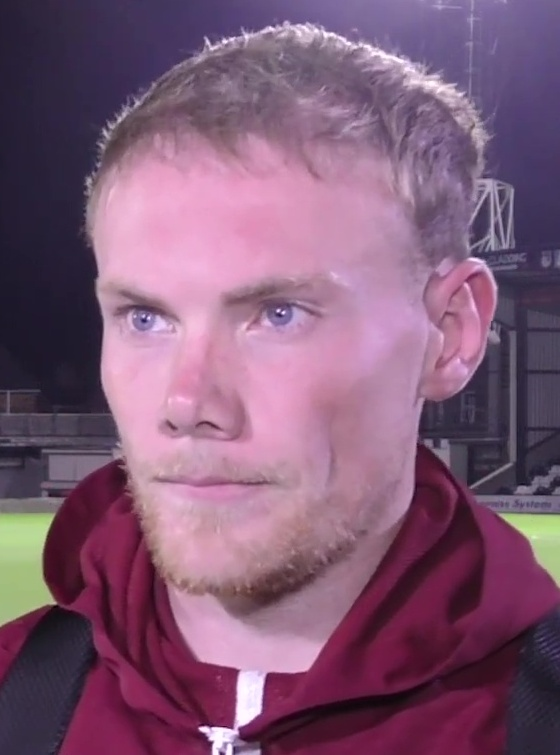
- Kelly with Bradford City in 2023

Personal information
- Full name: Ciarán Kelly
- Date of birth: 4 July 1998 (age 28)
- Place of birth: Lucan, Dublin, Ireland
- Height: 1.91 m (6 ft 3 in)
- Position: Centre-back

Team information
- Current team: Bristol Rovers
- Number: 17

Youth career
- 2003–2012: Esker Celtic
- 2012–2014: Lucan United
- 2014–2015: Peamount United
- 2015–2017: St Patrick's Athletic

Senior career*
Years	Team	Apps	(Gls)
2015–2017	St Patrick's Athletic	1	(0)
2018	Drogheda United	31	(6)
2019	St Patrick's Athletic	25	(1)
2020–2022	Bohemians	61	(1)
2020–2021	→ Ballymena United (loan)	12	(1)
2023–2026	Bradford City	77	(1)
2026–	Bristol Rovers	0	(0)
- * Club domestic league appearances and goals as of 10:29, 20 May 2026 (UTC)

Ciarán Kelly (born 4 July 1998) is an Irish professional footballer who plays as a defender for EFL League Two club Bristol Rovers.

He started his professional career with St Patrick's Athletic, also playing for Drogheda United, St Patrick's Athletic and Bohemians in his native Ireland, also spending time on loan with NIFL Premiership club Ballymena United.

== Club career ==
=== Early career ===
Kelly started playing football with his local side in Lucan, Esker Celtic where he played from under 5's age group, right up to under 14's. He then played for Lucan United from 2012 to 2014 before moving to Peamount United where he caught the eye of St Patrick's Athletic scouts.

=== St Patrick's Athletic ===
Kelly signed for St Patrick's Athletic on his 17th birthday ahead of their underage 2015 campaigns, with Kelly eligible for both the under 17 and under 19 sides. Kelly impressed for the under 19's among an excellent squad including Fuad Sule, Aidan Keena, Darragh Markey, Jamie Lennon, Jonathan Lunney, Rory Feely, Conor Kane and Shane Elworthy, all of whom went on to play at senior level in the League of Ireland Premier Division or abroad. His first involvement with the first team came on 16 October 2015, when manager Liam Buckley included him on the bench for a league game with Drogheda United, although he remained an unused substitute. Kelly and the under 19's were narrowly beaten by Cork City in the final of the Enda McGuill Cup on 13 September 2016. He made his first senior appearance on 25 October 2016 when he came off the bench for Ian Bermingham in the 88th minute of a 5–2 win over champions Dundalk at Richmond Park. Unfortunately for Kelly and the Pats under 19's, on 1 November 2017, they again finished up their season up as runners up in the league, as they lost 1–0 in the final to Bohemians at Dalymount Park, in what was Kelly's last game in underage football. Kelly made 2 more appearances for the first team in the 2017 season, against Firhouse Clover and Shelbourne in the Leinster Senior Cup.

=== Drogheda United season ===
With first team appearances at St Patrick's Athletic limited, it was announced on 1 January 2018 that Kelly had been persuaded to sign for Drogheda United by new manager Tim Clancy. Kelly's first career goal came on 11 March 2018, in a 6–0 win over Athlone Town at United Park on the opening night of the season. He proved to be a mainstay in the team and a key player as Drogheda had a late push in the league to finish in 4th place ahead of Longford Town to qualify for the League of Ireland Promotion Playoffs. His side beat Shelbourne over 2 legs before they were knocked out by Finn Harps despite Kelly scoring a vital goal in the first leg to give Drogs the lead. Kelly's first full season in senior football saw him make 39 appearances in all competitions, scoring seven goals from his centre back position.

=== Return to St Patrick's Athletic ===
On 20 November 2018, it was announced that Kelly had signed a contract back at St Patrick's Athletic under new manager Harry Kenny. Kelly's manager at Drogheda, Tim Clancy stated soon after his move that he would not have left the club if it had been any club other than Pat's. Kelly's first league start came against Finn Harps on 25 February 2019, with Kelly playing at left back, covering for the injured Ian Bermingham. He had to wait until the 12 April away to Cork City for his first start in his preferred centre back role and he impressed in a 1–1 draw which helped him nail down his spot in the starting 11 from there on. Kelly's first senior goal for Pats came in a 2–0 win over UCD. His first appearances in Europe came on 11 and 18 July 2019 as he played in both legs against IFK Norrköping of Sweden, as Pats lost 2–0 at home and 2–1 away with Kelly being sent off in the 89th minute after 2 yellow cards. Kelly announced on his Twitter account on 1 November 2019 that he was leaving St Patrick's Athletic following the ending of his contract.

=== Bohemians ===
Kelly was announced as a pre-season signing for Phibsborough side Bohemians before the 2020 League of Ireland campaign.

==== Ballymena United loan ====
After just 3 appearances in all competitions for Bohemians, Kelly was loaned out to NIFL Premiership side Ballymena United on the 1 October 2020 until January 2021. He made his debut in the opening game of the season, a 1–0 win away to Coleraine at The Showgrounds. Hiss first goal for the club came on the 19 December 2020 when he opened the scoring at home to Glentoran in an eventual 1–1 draw. He returned to Bohemians on the 11 January 2021 with his loan spell coming to a close.

=== Bradford City ===
On 12 December 2022, it was announced that Kelly had signed for EFL League Two side Bradford City from 1 January 2023 on a two-and-a-half-year contract, until the summer of 2025. At the end of the 2024–25 season, Bradford City entered into discussions with him regarding a new contract. On 24 June 2025, the club announced that Kelly had signed a one-year contract extension.

On 19 May 2026, the club announced that Kelly had not been offered a new contract and would depart the club.

=== Bristol Rovers ===
On 22 June 2026, Kelly joined EFL League Two club Bristol Rovers on a two-year deal, coming into effect on 1 July.

== Career statistics ==
As of end of 2025–26 season

Appearances and goals by club, season and competition
Club	Season	League			National Cup (Note: Includes FAI Cup & FA Cup)		League Cup (Note: Includes League of Ireland Cup & EFL Cup)		Europe		Other		Total	
Club	Season	Division	Apps	Goals	Apps	Goals	Apps	Goals	Apps	Goals	Apps	Goals	Apps	Goals
St Patrick's Athletic	2015	LOI Premier Division	0	0	0	0	0	0	0	0	0	0	0	0
St Patrick's Athletic	2016	LOI Premier Division	1	0	0	0	0	0	0	0	0	0	1	0
St Patrick's Athletic	2017	LOI Premier Division	0	0	0	0	0	0	—		2 (Note: Appearances in Leinster Senior Cup)	0	2	0
St Patrick's Athletic	Total		1	0	0	0	0	0	0	0	2	0	3	0
Drogheda United	2018	LOI First Division	31	6	2	0	1	0	—		5 (Note: 4 appearances & 1 goal in League of Ireland Promotion play-offs and 1 appearance in Leinster Senior Cup)	1	39	7
St Patrick's Athletic	2019	LOI Premier Division	25	1	2	0	1	0	2 (Note: Appearances in UEFA Europa League)	0	2	0	32	1
Bohemians	2020	LOI Premier Division	2	0	1	0	—		0	0	—		3	0
Bohemians	2021	LOI Premier Division	25	0	4	0	—		5 (Note: Appearances in UEFA Europa Conference League)	0	—		34	0
Bohemians	2022	LOI Premier Division	34	1	3	0	—		—		—		37	1
Bohemians	Total		61	1	8	0	—		5	0	—		74	1
Ballymena United (loan)	2020–21	NIFL Premiership	12	1	—		—		—		—		12	1
Bradford City	2022–23	League Two	4	0	—		—		—		0	0	4	0
Bradford City	2023–24	League Two	34	0	0	0	3	0	—		6 (Note: Appearances in EFL Trophy)	1	42	1
Bradford City	2024–25	League Two	21	1	0	0	0	0	—		2	0	23	1
Bradford City	2025–26	League One	18	0	0	0	3	0	—		3	0	24	0
Bradford City	Total		77	1	0	0	6	0	—		11	1	94	2
Bristol Rovers	2026–27	League Two	0	0	0	0	0	0	—		0	0	0	0
Career total			196	10	12	0	8	0	7	0	20	2	229	12
