= Jay Benn =

English footballer (born 2001)

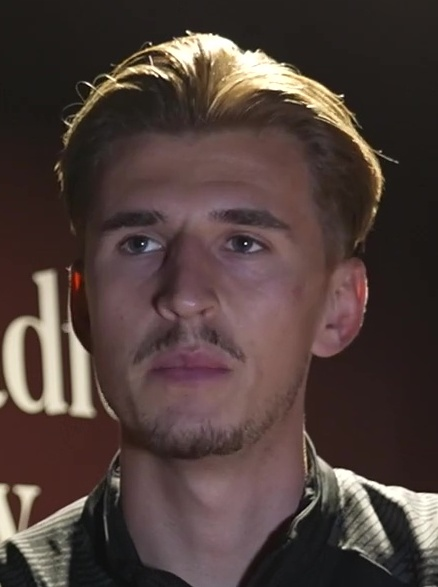

Personal information
- Full name: Jay Lewis Benn
- Date of birth: 22 August 2001 (age 25)
- Place of birth: Bradford, England
- Height: 1.77 m (5 ft 10 in)
- Position: Right back

Team information
- Current team: Hartlepool United
- Number: 2

Youth career
- –2020: FC Halifax Town

Senior career*
Years	Team	Apps	(Gls)
2020–2022	FC Halifax Town	12	(0)
2022–2025	Lincoln City	0	(0)
2023	→ Bohemians (loan)	8	(0)
2023–2024	→ Solihull Moors (loan)	27	(1)
2024–2025	→ Bradford City (loan)	12	(0)
2025–	Hartlepool United	51	(0)
- * Club domestic league appearances and goals as of 10:39, 15 November 2026 (UTC)

Jay Lewis Benn (born 22 August 2001) is an English professional footballer who plays for Hartlepool United, as a right back.

== Career ==
Born in Bradford, and growing up in Low Moor, Benn began his career with FC Halifax Town, before signing for Lincoln City in July 2022. He made his debut for the club on 30 August 2022, in the EFL Trophy. On 10 February 2023 he joined League of Ireland Premier Division club Bohemians on loan.

On 11 August 2023, Benn joined Solihull Moors on a season-long loan, appearing in the 2024 FA Trophy final for them.

On 30 August 2024, Benn joined Bradford City on a season-long loan, becoming the club's final signing of transfer deadline day. He made his debut in the EFL Trophy on 3 September 2024. He competed for a first-team place with fellow right back Brad Halliday, before making two assists in a 3–1 home game against Newport County, being Bradford's first league win in 5 games. In December 2024 he suffered an injury in a match against Swindon Town and was substituted at half time, but returned to training in the week. Following the end of the 2024–25 season Benn was released by Lincoln City.

On 30 June 2025, Benn signed for Hartlepool United. He made his debut against Yeovil Town on the opening day of the season.

== Career statistics ==
As of 14 November 2026

Appearances and goals by club, season and competition
Club	Season	League			FA Cup		EFL Cup		Other		Total	
Club	Season	Division	Apps	Goals	Apps	Goals	Apps	Goals	Apps	Goals	Apps	Goals
FC Halifax Town	2020–21	National League	2	0	0	0	–		0	0	2	0
FC Halifax Town	2021–22	National League	10	0	0	0	–		0	0	10	0
FC Halifax Town	Total		12	0	0	0	–		0	0	12	0
Lincoln City	2022–23	League One	0	0	0	0	0	0	1 (Note: Appearance(s) in the EFL Trophy.)	0	1	0
Lincoln City	2023–24	League One	0	0	0	0	1	0	1	0	2	0
Lincoln City	2024–25	League One	0	0	0	0	1	0	0	0	1	0
Lincoln City	Total		0	0	0	0	2	0	2	0	4	0
Bohemians (loan)	2023	LOI Premier Division	8	0	–		–		1 (Note: Appearance in the Leinster Senior Cup.)	0	9	0
Solihull Moors (loan)	2023–24	National League	27	1	0	0	–		7 (Note: Five appearances in the FA Trophy, two appearances in the National League play-offs.)	0	34	1
Bradford City (loan)	2024–25	League Two	12	0	2	0	–		3	0	17	0
Hartlepool United	2025–26	National League	41	0	2	0	–		1	0	44	0
Hartlepool United	2026–27	National League	10	0	0	0	–		0	0	10	0
Hartlepool United	Total		51	0	2	0	0	0	1	0	54	0
Career total			110	1	4	0	2	0	13	0	130	1

== Honours ==
Solihull Moors

- FA Trophy runner-up: 2023–24
