= Adam Wilson (footballer) =

Footballer (born 2000)

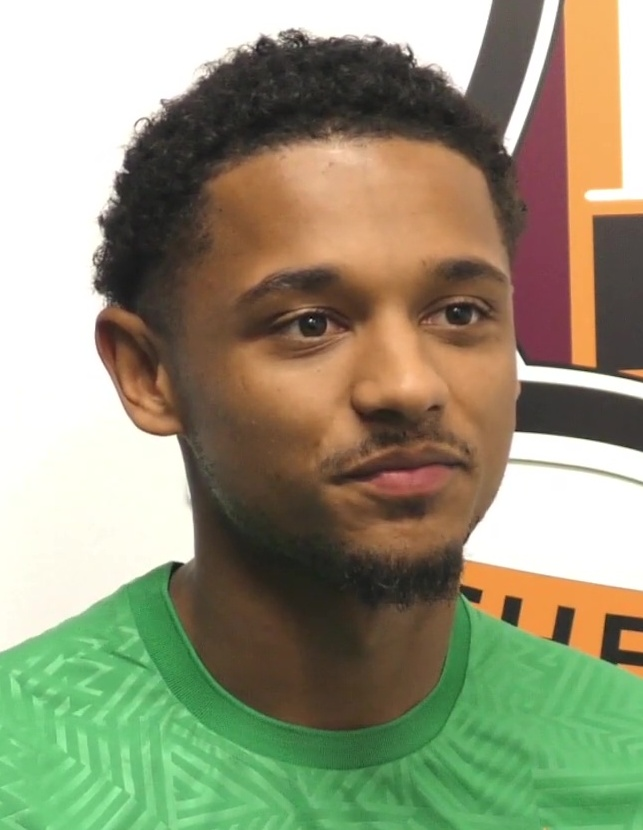
- Wilson with Bradford City in 2023

Personal information
- Full name: Adam Ayiro Wilson
- Date of birth: 10 April 2000 (age 26)
- Place of birth: Ashington, England
- Height: 1.79 m (5 ft 10 in)
- Position: Winger

Team information
- Current team: The New Saints
- Number: 11

Youth career
- Newcastle United

Senior career*
Years	Team	Apps	(Gls)
2022–2023	The New Saints	19	(7)
2023–2025	Bradford City	10	(1)
2024–2025	→ The New Saints (loan)	26	(9)
2025–	The New Saints	13	(0)

International career^{‡}
2018	England U18	4	(0)
2025–	Kenya	4	(0)
- * Club domestic league appearances and goals as of 06:45, 7 November 2026 (UTC) ‡ National team caps and goals as of 14 October 2025

Adam Ayiro Wilson (born 10 April 2000) is a professional footballer who plays as a winger for Cymru Premier club The New Saints. Born in England, he plays for the Kenya national team.

== Club career ==
Born in Ashington, Wilson began his career at Newcastle United, turning professional in July 2018, and signing a new contract with the club in July 2020. He moved to Welsh club The New Saints in September 2022. He scored seven goals in 22 appearances in all competitions for the club, winning the league title and Welsh Cup double, and being named the Supporters' Player of the Year.

After being encouraged by TNS to seek a Football League club, Wilson signed for Bradford City on 28 August 2023 on a three-year contract. After making his debut in the EFL Cup, he was rested for league play as he was being "built up". He scored his first goal for the club on 21 October 2023, a late equaliser at home to Wrexham in the league.

After losing his first-team place, Wilson was encouraged by Bradford City manager Graham Alexander.

On 20 August 2024, Wilson returned to his former club The New Saints on a season-long loan deal. With TNS he made European history, becoming the first Welsh club to qualify for the group stages of the UEFA Conference League, with Wilson appearing for TNS in the competition. In March 2025 he scored a hat-trick in a 6–0 win against Cardiff Met.

After returning to Bradford City, ahead of the 2025–26 season Wilson was told by Alexander that he could leave the club. He left the club by mutual consent on 1 September 2025. Later that month, he returned to The New Saints on a permanent contract.

== International career ==
Wilson was born in England to an English father and Kenyan mother, and holds dual British-Kenyan citizenship. He played for England at under-18 level, making his debut in March 2018. and making four appearances in total. In May 2024, he was called up by the Kenya national team. He debuted with Kenya in a 0–0 friendly tie with Chad on 7 June 2025.

== Playing style ==
Primarily a winger, Wilson has also featured at left-back.

== Career statistics ==
As of 6 November 2026

Appearances and goals by club, season and competition
Club	Season	League			National cup		League cup		Other		Total	
Club	Season	Division	Apps	Goals	Apps	Goals	Apps	Goals	Apps	Goals	Apps	Goals
The New Saints	2022–23	Cymru Premier	19	7	2	0	—		1 (Note: Appearance in the Scottish Challenge Cup.)	0	22	7
Bradford City	2023–24	League Two	10	1	1	0	2	0	3 (Note: Appearances in the EFL Trophy.)	0	16	1
Bradford City	2024–25	League Two	0	0	0	0	0	0	0	0	0	0
Bradford City	Total		10	1	1	0	2	0	3	0	16	1
The New Saints (loan)	2024–25	Cymru Premier	26	9	3	0	2	0	8 (Note: Appearances in the UEFA Conference League.)	0	39	9
The New Saints	2025–26	Cymru Premier	8	0	0	0	0	0	0	0	8	0
The New Saints	2026–27	Cymru Premier	5	0	0	0	0	0	0	0	5	0
The New Saints	Total		13	0	0	0	0	0	0	0	13	0
Career total			68	17	6	0	4	0	12	0	90	17
