= 2026–27 Queens Park Rangers F.C. season =

English football club season

Queens Park Rangers
2026–27 season
- Owner: Ruben Gnanalingam (60%); Richard Reilly (21%); Lakshmi Mittal (19%)
- Chairman: Lee Hoos
- Head coach: Julien Stéphan
- Stadium: Loftus Road
- EFL Cup: First round
- Top goalscorer: League: Richard Kone (5) All: Richard Kone (5)
- Highest home attendance: 17,504 (v. Swansea City; EFL Championship, 24 October 2026)
- Lowest home attendance: 14,747 (v. Burnley, EFL Championship, 3 November 2026)
- Biggest win: 5-0 v. Swansea City (h); EFL Championship, 24 October 2026
- Biggest defeat: 0–3 v. Birmingham City (A); EFL Championship, 17 October 2026
Home colours	Away colours	Third colours

The 2026–27 season is the 145th season in the history of Queens Park Rangers Football Club and their twelfth consecutive season in the Championship. In addition to the domestic league, the club would also participate in the FA Cup, and the EFL Cup.

== Squad ==
Boy Kemper wearing the Queen's Park Rangers "blackout" kit in the 3–0 defeat by Birmingham City at St Andrews @ Knighthead Park, 17 October 2026

As of 22 November 2026

No.	Name	Nationality	Position(s)	Since	Date of birth (age)	Signed from	Apps	Goals
Goalkeepers
1	Pierce Charles	(Northern Ireland)	GK	2026	21 July 2005 (age 21)	(England) Manchester City	17	0
13	Calum Ward	(England)	GK	2026	17 October 2000 (age 26)	(Scotland) Motherwell	0	0
32	Matteo Salamon	(England)	GK	2015	8 February 2004 (age 22)	(England) QPR Academy	0	0
Defenders
2	Kealey Adamson	(Australia)	RB	2025	17 February 2003 (age 23)	(Australia) Macarthur FC	24	0
3	Jimmy Dunne (captain)	(Republic of Ireland)	CB / RB	2021	19 October 1997 (age 29)	(England) Burnley	218	17
4	Liam Morrison	(Scotland)	CB	2024	7 April 2003 (age 23)	(Germany) Bayern Munich	33	0
5	Ronnie Edwards	(England)	CB	2026	28 March 2003 (age 23)	(England) Southampton	56	3
6	Jake Clarke-Salter	(England)	CB	2022	22 September 1997 (age 29)	(England) Chelsea	87	1
12	Boy Kemper	(Netherlands)	LB	2026	21 June 1999 (age 27)	(Netherlands) NAC Breda	10	0
19	Dennis Cirkin	(Latvia)	LB	2026	19 September 2002 (age 24)	(England) Sunderland	12	0
27	Amadou Mbengue	(Senegal)	CB / RB	2025	5 January 2002 (age 24)	(England) Reading	53	2
48	Tariq Lamptey	(Ghana)	RB	2026	30 September 2000 (age 26)	(Italy) Fiorentina	6	0
–	Esquerdinha	(Brazil)	LB	2025	28 February 2006 (age 20)	(Brazil) Fluminense	16	0
–	Timothy Akindileni	(Czech Republic)	CB	2025	4 September 2007 (age 19)	(Scotland) Aberdeen	0	0
Midfielders
7	Karamoko Dembélé	(England)	RW	2024	22 February 2003 (age 23)	(France) Brest	59	4
10	Ilias Chair	(Morocco)	AM / LW	2017	30 October 1997 (age 29)	(Belgium) Lierse	290	40
11	Paul Smyth	(Northern Ireland)	RW / LW	2023	10 September 1997 (age 29)	(England) Leyton Orient	168	16
14	Kōki Saitō	(Japan)	LW	2024	10 August 2001 (age 25)	(Belgium) Lommel	90	7
17	Kwame Poku	(Ghana)	RW	2025	11 August 2001 (age 25)	(England) Peterborough United	30	1
18	Glen Kamara	(Finland)	CM	2026	28 October 1995 (age 31)	(France) Rennes	16	1
20	Harvey Vale	(Republic of Ireland)	AM / RM / LM / CM / LWB	2025	11 September 2003 (age 23)	(England) Chelsea	46	5
23	Isak Alemayehu	(Sweden)	AM / RW	2025	11 October 2006 (age 20)	(Sweden) Djurgårdens IF	2	0
24	Nicolas Madsen	(Denmark)	CM	2024	17 March 2000 (age 26)	(Belgium) Westerlo	84	9
33	Leon Scarlett	(Wales)	LW	2024	16 August 2009 (age 17)	(England) Arsenal	6	0
40	Jonathan Varane	(Martinique)	CM / DM	2024	11 October 2001 (age 25)	(Spain) Sporting Gijón	91	3
–	Teddy Tarbotton	(England)	CM	2020	29 July 2007 (age 19)	(England) Hull City	1	0
–	Kalen Brunson	(Bermuda)	LW	2024	17 March 2009 (age 17)	(England) QPR Academy	1	0
–	Ashley Trujillo	(Colombia)	RW	2024	10 December 2008 (age 17)	(England) QPR Academy	1	0
Forwards
15	Alfie Lloyd	(England)	CF	2021	30 April 2003 (age 23)	(England) Yeovil Town	40	3
16	Rumarn Burrell	(Jamaica)	CF	2025	16 December 2000 (age 25)	(England) Burton Albion	41	12
22	Richard Kone	(Ivory Coast)	CF	2025	15 July 2003 (age 23)	(England) Wycombe Wanderers	56	16
25	Justin Obikwu	(Trinidad and Tobago)	CF	2026	8 February 2004 (age 22)	(England) Coventry City	3	0
26	Rayan Kolli	(Algeria)	CF / LW / LW	2023	10 February 2005 (age 21)	(England) QPR Academy	62	11
Out on loan
–	Joe Walsh	(England)	GK	2021	1 April 2002 (age 24)	(England) Gillingham	31	0
–	Daniel Bennie	(Australia)	LW / RW / CF	2024	14 April 2006 (age 20)	(Australia) Perth Glory	32	2
–	Jaiden Putman	(England)	RB	2015	18 September 2006 (age 20)	(England) QPR Academy	1	0
–	Tylon Smith	(South Africa)	CB	2025	9 May 2005 (age 21)	(South Africa) Stellenbosch	4	0
–	Jaylan Pearman	(Australia)	AM	2025	18 April 2005 (age 21)	(Australia) Perth Glory	1	0
–	Ziyad Larkeche	(France)	LB / CB	2023	6 April 2002 (age 24)	(England) Fulham	22	0
–	Kieran Morgan	(England)	CM / RB	2024	17 March 2006 (age 20)	(England) Tottenham Hotspur	61	3
–	Emmerson Sutton	(England)	LW / RW	2023	28 December 2006 (age 19)	(England) QPR Academy	3	0

=== Players from Queens Park Rangers Reserves and Academy ===
As of 10 September 2026

Note: Flags indicate national team as defined under FIFA eligibility rules; some limited exceptions apply. Players may hold more than one non-FIFA nationality.

No.	Pos.	Nation	Player
—	GK	ENG	Alfie Fittall
—	GK	ENG	Charlie Warren
—	GK	ENG	Kasey Taylor
—	DF	GHA	Cory Adjetey-Brew
—	DF	ENG	Charlie Street
—	DF	ENG	Nkhai Majestyt
—	DF	ENG	Shaquille Sandiford
—	DF	AUS	Christian Pullella
—	DF	USA	Eddie Chadwick

No.	Pos.	Nation	Player
—	DF	SCO	Rocco Friel
—	MF	ENG	Kaleb Dyke
—	MF	IRL	Harvey Boddy
—	MF	ENG	Giovanni Ikoroha
—	MF	ENG	Fraser Neill
—	MF	ENG	Rico Kennedy
—	MF	ENG	Kyreece Moore
—	MF	SCO	James McAvoy
—	MF	ENG	Amar Sanghrajka

No.	Pos.	Nation	Player
—	MF	ENG	Thomas Wiles
—	FW	ENG	Ridwan Hassan
35	FW	ENG	Philip Sanyaolu
—	FW	ENG	Gabriel Oluwabusola
—	FW	ENG	Kemuel Edouard-Marisson
—	FW	ENG	Rayan Manktalow
—	FW	IRL	Joshua Wright
—	FW	WAL	Declan De-Vult

== Transfers and contracts ==
=== In ===
Date	Pos.	Player	From	Fee	Ref.
1 July 2026 (Note: The transfer was announced on 20 June, and would become official on July 1 once Kemper's contract at NAC Breda expired.)	LB	(Netherlands) Boy Kemper	(Netherlands) NAC Breda	Free	
9 July 2026	GK	(England) Calum Ward	(Scotland) Motherwell	£800,000	
21 July 2026	RB	(Ghana) Tariq Lamptey	(Italy) Fiorentina	Free	
12 August 2026	LB	(Latvia) Dennis Cirkin	(England) Sunderland	Free	
28 August 2026	RB	(Singapore) Eddie Chadwick	(United States) LA Galaxy	Free	
28 August 2026	CF	(Wales) Declan De-Vult	(Wales) Trefelin BGC	Undisclosed	
28 August 2026	CM	(India) Amar Sanghrajka	(England) Watford	Undisclosed	
12 October 2026	CB	(Republic of Ireland) Oisin McDonagh	(Italy) Venezia	Free	

=== Out ===
Date	Pos.	Player	To	Fee	Ref.
19 June 2026	CDM	(England) Sam Field	(England) Norwich City	£1,500,000 (Note: A potential further £1,300,000 in promotion-related add-ons.)	
14 July 2026	GK	(England) Murphy Cooper	(England) Plymouth Argyle	£250,000 (Note: A potential further £250,000 in add-ons.)	
17 July 2026	CF	(Slovenia) Žan Celar	(Switzerland) Basel	£1,300,000	
21 July 2026	CF	(Republic of Ireland) Cian Dillon	(Republic of Ireland) Dundalk	Undisclosed	
30 July 2026	RB	(Brazil) Hevertton Santos	(Bulgaria) Levski Sofia	Undisclosed	
14 August 2026	CB	(England) Alex Wilkie	(Northern Ireland) Larne	Undisclosed	

=== Loans in ===
Date	Pos.	Player	From	Loaned until	Ref.
10 July 2026	GK	(Northern Ireland) Pierce Charles	(England) Manchester City	End of Season	
3 August 2026	CM	(Finland) Glen Kamara	(France) Rennes	End of Season	

=== Loans out ===
Date	Pos.	Player	To	Loaned until	Ref.
9 July 2026	GK	(England) Joe Walsh	(England) Wigan Athletic	End of Season	
10 July 2026	CM	(England) Harvey Boddy	(England) Worthing	End of Season	
24 July 2026	CAM	(England) Archie O'Brien	(England) Hemel Hempstead Town	22 August 2026	
27 July 2026	LB	(England) Cory Adjetey-Brew	(England) Worthing	3 January 2027 (Note: On 22 October, Adjetey-Brew's initial three-month loan at Worhing was extended until January.)	
29 July 2026	LW	(Australia) Daniel Bennie	(Scotland) Dundee United	End of Season	
7 August 2026	RB	(England) Jaiden Putman	(England) Woking	End of Season (Note: On 14 October, Putman's initial two-month loan at Woking was extended until the end of the season)	
13 August 2026	CB	(South Africa) Tylon Smith	(United States) New England Revolution	End of Season (Note: Includes an option to make the move permanent.)	
14 August 2026	CAM	(Australia) Jaylan Pearman	(England) Swindon Town	End of Season	
24 August 2026	RW	(England) Philip Sanyaolu	(England) Bristol Rovers	End of Season	
29 August 2026	LB	(France) Ziyad Larkeche	(England) Barnsley	End of Season	
31 August 2026	CM	(England) Kieran Morgan	(England) Bradford City	End of Season	
25 September 2026	LW	(England) Emmerson Sutton	(England) Worthing	21 November 2026	

=== Released / out of contract ===
Date	Pos.	Player	Subsequent club	Joined date	Ref.
30 June 2026	CB	(England) Gabriel Cuthbert	(England) Uxbridge	1 July 2026	
30 June 2026	CM	(Wales) Alfie Tuck	(England) Maidstone United	1 July 2026	
30 June 2026	CB	(Scotland) Noah McCann	(Australia) Central Coast Mariners	2 July 2026	
30 June 2026	CB	(England) Steve Cook	(England) Wycombe Wanderers	3 July 2026	
30 June 2026	CDM	(Jamaica) Isaac Hayden	(England) Leyton Orient	10 July 2026	
30 June 2026	GK	(France) Paul Nardi	(France) Auxerre	22 July 2026	
30 June 2026	GK	(England) Joel Halliday	(England) Swindon Supermarine	14 July 2026	
30 June 2026	CF	(England) Rohan Vaughan	(England) Harrogate Town	23 July 2026	
30 June 2026	LB	(England) Jake Leahy	(England) Hanworth Villa	8 August 2026	
30 June 2026	CB	(England) Jack McDowell	(United States) VM Men’s Soccer	9 August 2026	
30 June 2026	CM	(Kosovo) Enis Neziri	(Kosovo) KF Malisheva	11 August 2026	
30 June 2026	CB	(Nigeria) Isaiah Balogun			
30 June 2026	RM	(England) Jake Coomes	(England) Uxbridge		
30 June 2026	GK	(England) Ben Hamer			
30 June 2026	CB	(England) Mason Skeete			
29 July 2026	CM	(England) Elijah Dixon-Bonner			

=== New contracts ===
Date	Pos.	Player	Contract expiry	Ref.
1 July 2026 (Note: The contract was announced on 27 June, and would officially begin on July 1.)	CF	(England) Ridwan Hassan	Undisclosed (Note: First professional contract)	
1 July 2026 (Note: The contract was announced on 26 June, and would officially begin on July 1.)	CM	(England) Fraser Neill	Undisclosed	
1 July 2026	GK	(England) Matteo Salamon	Undisclosed	
1 July 2026 (Note: The contract was announced on 24 June, and would officially begin on July 1.)	RW	(England) Philip Sanyaolu	Undisclosed	
8 July 2026	LB	(England) Cory Adjetey-Brew	Undisclosed	
22 July 2026	CM	(Denmark) Nicolas Madsen	Undisclosed	
30 August 2026	CF	(England) Alfie Lloyd	Undisclosed	

== Pre-season and friendlies ==
On 30 May, QPR announced a pre-season training camp in Vienna between 9–17 July, with fixtures against 1. Wiener Neustädter and First Vienna. Ten days later, three further fixtures were added to the schedule against Bromley, AFC Wimbledon and Wycombe Wanderers, the latter behing played behind closed doors. A home friendly against Fiorentina was next to be announced.

11 July 2026 Friendly	First Vienna	0–0	Queens Park Rangers	Döbling, Austria
18:30 CEST		Report		Stadium: Hohe Warte Stadium

16 July 2026 Friendly	Wiener Neustadt	1–3	Queens Park Rangers	Wiener Neustadt, Austria
18:30 CEST	Toifl 52'	Report	Burrell 6'; Mbengue 30'; Kone 89' (pen.)	Stadium: Wiener Neustadt Arena

21 July 2026 Friendly	Queens Park Rangers	1–0	Wycombe Wanderers	Heston
13:00 BST	Kone 80'	Report		Stadium: TSG Elite Training & Performance Centre; Attendance: 0 (BCD)

25 July 2026 Friendly	Queens Park Rangers	3–2	Fiorentina	Shepherd's Bush
15:00 BST	Madsen 30' (pen.); Kemper 39'; Smyth 54'	Report	Piccoli 45'; Atta 65'	Stadium: MATRADE Loftus Road

31 July 2026 Friendly	Bromley	0−7	Queens Park Rangers	Bromley
19:30 BST		Report	Chair 2'; Lloyd 4', 58', 67'; Smyth 40'; Alemayehu 53'; Sanyaolu 55'	Stadium: Copperjax Community Stadium

1 August 2026 Friendly	AFC Wimbledon	2−3	Queens Park Rangers	Wimbledon
15:00 BST	Sasu 68', 71'	Report	Saito 22'; Scarlett 62'; Pearman 82'	Stadium: Cherry Red Records Stadium

== Competitions ==
=== Overall record ===
Competition	First match	Last match	Starting round	Final position	Record							
Competition	First match	Last match	Starting round	Final position	Pld	W	D	L	GF	GA	GD	Win %
EFL Championship	15 August 2026	May 2027	Matchday 1	TBD	16	7	6	3	25	18	+7	43.75
FA Cup	January 2027	TBC	Third round	TBC	0	0	0	0	0	0	+0	—
EFL Cup	8 August 2026		First round	First round	1	0	1	0	1	1	+0	0.00
Total					17	7	7	3	26	19	+7	41.18

Last updated: 21 November 2026
Source: Soccerway

=== EFL Championship ===
==== League table ====
Pos	Team	Pld	W	D	L	GF	GA	GD	Pts	Promotion, qualification or relegation
5	West Bromwich Albion	16	8	5	3	25	17	+8	29	Qualification for Championship play-off quarter-finals
6	Southampton	16	9	4	3	31	15	+16	27 (Note: Southampton were deducted four points due to multiple breaches of EFL regulations related to the unauthorised filming of other clubs' training.)	Qualification for Championship play-off quarter-finals
7	Queens Park Rangers	16	7	6	3	25	18	+7	27	Qualification for Championship play-off quarter-finals
8	Swansea City	16	8	3	5	24	20	+4	27	Qualification for Championship play-off quarter-finals
9	Sheffield United	16	7	4	5	25	19	+6	25	

Updated to match(es) played on 21 November 2026. Source: EFL Official Website
Rules for classification: 1) Points; 2) Goal difference; 3) Number of goals scored; 4) Head-to-head results; 5) Wins; 6) Away goals; 7) Penalty points (sec 9.5); 8) Number of 12-point sending off offences; 9) Play-off (only if needed to determine promotion/relegation)

==== Results summary ====
Overall								Home						Away					
Pld	W	D	L	GF	GA	GD	Pts	W	D	L	GF	GA	GD	W	D	L	GF	GA	GD
16	7	6	3	25	18	+7	27	4	3	1	16	7	+9	3	3	2	9	11	−2

Last updated: 21 November 2026.
Source: Soccerway

==== Results by round ====
Round	1	2	3	4	5	6	7	8	9	10	11	12	13	14	15	16	17	18	19	20	21	22	23	24	25	26	27	28	29	30	31	32	33	34	35	36	37	38	39	40	41	42	43	44	45	46
Ground	A	H	A	H	H	A	A	H	A	H	A	H	A	H	H	A	A	H	A	H	H	A	H	A	A	H	H	A	A	H	H	A	A	H	A	H	A	H	A	H	H	A	H	A	H	A
Result	W	D	W	W	L	D	D	D	D	W	L	W	L	D	W	W																														
Position	1	5	4	2	3	4	5	6	6	5	9	8	9	11	8	7																														
Points	3	4	7	10	10	11	12	13	14	17	17	20	20	21	24	27																														

Source: EFL
A = Away; H = Home; W = Win; D = Draw; L = Loss; P = Postponed

==== Matches ====
The Championship fixtures were released on 25 June 2026.

15 August 2026 1	Portsmouth	1–3	Queens Park Rangers	Portsmouth
15:00 BST	Devlin 15'	Report	Edwards (yellow card) 25'; Chair 33', 45+2'; Saitō 40'	Stadium: Fratton Park; Attendance: 20,479 (2,197 away); Referee: Will Finnie

22 August 2026 2	Queens Park Rangers	0–0	Bolton Wanderers	Shepherd's Bush
15:00 BST	Clarke-Salter (yellow card) 75'	Report	Gale (yellow card) 45+1'; Hardie (yellow card) 73'	Stadium: Loftus Road; Attendance: 17,402 (1,750 away); Referee: Edward Duckworth

29 August 2026 3	Blackburn Rovers	1–2	Queens Park Rangers	Blackburn
15:00 BST	Morishita 49'; Guðjohnsen (yellow card) 65'; McLoughlin (yellow card) 76'; Morsy (yellow card) 80'	Report	Clarke-Salter (yellow card) 30'; Edwards (yellow card) 40'; Smyth 51'; Dunne 74'	Stadium: Ewood Park; Attendance: 12,905 (918 away); Referee: Gavin Ward

2 September 2026 4	Queens Park Rangers	2–1	Cardiff City	Shepherd's Bush
19:45 BST	Burrell 36', 53'	Report	Tanner (yellow card) 47'; Ng 75', (yellow card) 77'	Stadium: Loftus Road; Attendance: 15,027 (1,207 away); Referee: Tim Robinson

5 September 2026 5	Queens Park Rangers	0–1	Middlesbrough	Shepherd's Bush
15:00 BST	Kamara (yellow card) 90+6'	Report	Lankshear 20'; Malanda (yellow card) 58'; Brittain (yellow card) 76'	Stadium: Loftus Road; Attendance: 17,007 (1,750 away); Referee: Andy Madley

9 September 2026 6	Charlton Athletic	0–0	Queens Park Rangers	Charlton
20:00 BST		Report	Adamson (yellow card) 74'; Clarke-Salter (yellow card) 76'	Stadium: The Valley; Attendance: 17,876 (3,051 away); Referee: Tom Nield
Note: Fixture was initially scheduled for a 19:45 kick-off, but was moved for live Sky Sports broadcast.

12 September 2026 7	West Bromwich Albion	1–1	Queens Park Rangers	West Bromwich
12:30 BST	Styles 41'; Diakité (yellow card) 90+3'	Report	Mepham 38' (o.g.); Kamara (yellow card) 51'; Clarke-Salter (yellow card) 63'; Varane (yellow card) 64'; Burrell (yellow card) 80'	Stadium: The Hawthorns; Attendance: 24,547 (1,453 away); Referee: Ruebyn Ricardo
Note: Fixture was initially scheduled for a 15:00 kick-off, but was moved for live Sky Sports broadcast.

19 September 2026 8	Queens Park Rangers	2–2	Preston North End	Shepherd's Bush
15:00 BST	Cirkin (red card) 15'; Scarlett (yellow card) 22'; Saitō (yellow card) 55'; Poku 66'; Smyth 90'	Report	Kenny 1', 26'; Hughes (yellow card) 24'; Clarke (yellow card) 90'; Thompson (yellow card) 90+5'	Stadium: Loftus Road; Attendance: 16,582 (846 away); Referee: Thomas Parsons

9 October 2026 9	West Ham United	1–1	Queens Park Rangers	Stratford
20:00 BST	Engels (yellow card) 17'; Morato (yellow card) 65'; Bowen 70', (penalty missed) 90+2'	Report	Madsen 18' (pen.); Kemper (yellow card) 24'; Kamara (yellow card) 62'; Mbengue (yellow card) 90'; Kone (yellow card) 90+1'	Stadium: London Stadium; Attendance: 62,140 (3,000 away); Referee: Ruebyn Ricardo
Note: Fixture was initially scheduled for 10 October, but was moved for live Sky Sports broadcast.

14 October 2026 10	Queens Park Rangers	4–1	Derby County	Shepherd's Bush
19:45 BST	Lloyd 18'; Madsen 22' (pen.); Vale 45', (yellow card) 57'; Kamara (yellow card) 60'; Smyth 68'	Report	Ozoh (yellow card) 24'; Szmodics (yellow card) 44'; Mowatt (yellow card) 45'; Meister (yellow card) 56'; Salvesen 90+10'	Stadium: Loftus Road; Attendance: 16,322 (1,738 away); Referee: Matthew Corlett

17 October 2026 11	Birmingham City	3–0	Queens Park Rangers	Birmingham
15:00 BST	Solís (yellow card) 23'; Millar 27', 49'; Klarer (yellow card) 69'; Gray 90+1'	Report	Vale (yellow card) 44'; Kolli (yellow card) 50'	Stadium: St Andrew's; Attendance: 27,688 (1,995 away); Referee: Thomas Kirk

24 October 2026 12	Queens Park Rangers	5–0	Swansea City	Shepherd's Bush
15:00 BST	Kone 2', 9', 15' (pen.), (yellow card) 16'; Dunne 45+1', 86'; Smyth (yellow card) 59'	Report	Vigouroux (yellow card) 14'; Just (yellow card) 34'; Stamenić (yellow card) 54'	Stadium: Loftus Road; Attendance: 17,504 (1,758 away); Referee: Sam Allison

31 October 2026 13	Southampton	4–1	Queens Park Rangers	Southampton
15:00 GMT	Matsuki 11'; Bragg 55'; Schlotterbeck 66'; Welington 90+5'	Report	Kone 68'; Varane (yellow card) 72'; Adamson (yellow card) 83'; Dunne (yellow card) 86'	Stadium: St Mary's Stadium; Attendance: 30,531 (3,008 away); Referee: Tim Robinson

3 November 2026 14	Queens Park Rangers	1–1	Burnley	Shepherd's Bush
19:45 GMT	Varane (yellow card) 50', (goal) 65'	Report	Laurent (yellow card) 2'; Ramazani 38'; Sonne (yellow card) 90+3'	Stadium: Loftus Road; Attendance: 14,747 (732 away); Referee: Tom Reeves

7 November 2026 15	Queens Park Rangers	2–1	Lincoln City	Shepherd's Bush
15:00 GMT	Smyth (yellow card) 8'; Kone 11'; Kamara 80'; Cirkin (yellow card) 90+3'	Report	McGrandles (yellow card) 1'; Jefferies 29'; Konak (yellow card) 33'	Stadium: Loftus Road; Attendance: 17,478 (1,745 away); Referee: Bobby Madley

21 November 2026 16	Millwall	0–1	Queens Park Rangers	Bermondsey
12:30 GMT	Sturge (red card) 15'; Taylor (yellow card) 53'; Neghli (yellow card) 61'; Osei-Tutu (yellow card) 71'; Cooper (yellow card) 86'	Report	Adamson (yellow card) 21'; Madsen 45+1'	Stadium: The Den; Attendance: 19,984 (2,062 away); Referee: Josh Smith
Note: Fixture was initially scheduled for a 15:00 kick-off, but was moved for live Sky Sports broadcast.

24 November 2026 17	Norwich City	v	Queens Park Rangers	Norwich
19:45 GMT				Stadium: Carrow Road

28 November 2026 18	Queens Park Rangers	v	Sheffield United	Shepherd's Bush
15:00 GMT				Stadium: Loftus Road

5 December 2026 19	Stoke City	v	Queens Park Rangers	Stoke-on-Trent
15:00 GMT				Stadium: bet365 Stadium

8 December 2026 20	Queens Park Rangers	v	Wolverhampton Wanderers	Shepherd's Bush
19:45 GMT				Stadium: Loftus Road

12 December 2026 21	Queens Park Rangers	v	Watford	Shepherd's Bush
12:30 GMT				Stadium: Loftus Road
Note: Fixture was initially scheduled for a 15:00 kick-off, but was moved for live Sky Sports broadcast.

19 December 2026 22	Wrexham	v	Queens Park Rangers	Wrexham
15:00 GMT				Stadium: Racecourse Ground

26 December 2026 23	Queens Park Rangers	v	Bristol City	Shepherd's Bush
15:00 GMT				Stadium: Loftus Road

29 December 2026 24	Swansea City	v	Queens Park Rangers	Swansea
19:45 GMT				Stadium: Swansea.com Stadium

1 January 2027 25	Watford	v	Queens Park Rangers	Watford
15:00 GMT				Stadium: Vicarage Road

16 January 2027 26	Queens Park Rangers	v	Birmingham City	Shepherd's Bush
12:30 GMT				Stadium: Loftus Road
Note: Fixture was initially scheduled for a 15:00 kick-off, but was brought forward for live Sky Sports broadcasting.

23 January 2027 27	Queens Park Rangers	v	Southampton	Shepherd's Bush
12:30 GMT				Stadium: Loftus Road
Note: Fixture was initially scheduled for a 15:00 kick-off, but was brought forward for live Sky Sports broadcasting.

26 January 2027 28	Burnley	v	Queens Park Rangers	Burnley
19:45 GMT				Stadium: Turf Moor

29 January 2027 29	Lincoln City	v	Queens Park Rangers	Lincoln
20:00 GMT				Stadium: Sincil Bank
Note: Fixture was initially scheduled for 30 January, but was brought forward to the night before for live Sky Sports broadcasting.

6 February 2027 30	Queens Park Rangers	v	Millwall	Shepherd's Bush
15:00 GMT				Stadium: Loftus Road

13 February 2027 31	Queens Park Rangers	v	West Bromwich Albion	Shepherd's Bush
15:00 GMT				Stadium: Loftus Road

16 February 2027 32	Derby County	v	Queens Park Rangers	Derby
19:45 GMT				Stadium: Pride Park Stadium

20 February 2027 33	Preston North End	v	Queens Park Rangers	Preston
15:00 GMT				Stadium: Deepdale

27 February 2027 34	Queens Park Rangers	v	West Ham United	Shepherd's Bush
12:30 GMT				Stadium: Loftus Road
Note: Fixture was initially scheduled for a 15:00 kick-off, but was brought forward for live Sky Sports broadcasting.

2 March 2027 35	Bolton Wanderers	v	Queens Park Rangers	Bolton
19:45 GMT				Stadium: Toughsheet Community Stadium

6 March 2027 36	Queens Park Rangers	v	Portsmouth	Shepherd's Bush
15:00 GMT				Stadium: Loftus Road

13 March 2027 37	Sheffield United	v	Queens Park Rangers	Sheffield
15:00 GMT				Stadium: Bramall Lane

16 March 2027 38	Queens Park Rangers	v	Stoke City	Shepherd's Bush
19:45 GMT				Stadium: Loftus Road

20 March 2027 39	Bristol City	v	Queens Park Rangers	Bristol
15:00 GMT				Stadium: Ashton Gate

3 April 2027 40	Queens Park Rangers	v	Wrexham	Shepherd's Bush
15:00 BST				Stadium: Loftus Road

6 April 2027 41	Queens Park Rangers	v	Charlton Athletic	Shepherd's Bush
19:45 BST				Stadium: Loftus Road

10 April 2027 42	Middlesbrough	v	Queens Park Rangers	Middlesbrough
15:00 BST				Stadium: Riverside Stadium

17 April 2027 43	Queens Park Rangers	v	Blackburn Rovers	Shepherd's Bush
15:00 BST				Stadium: Loftus Road

21 April 2027 44	Cardiff City	v	Queens Park Rangers	Cardiff
19:45 BST				Stadium: Cardiff City Stadium

25 April 2027 45	Wolverhampton Wanderers	v	Queens Park Rangers	Wolverhampton
15:00 BST				Stadium: Molineux Stadium

1 May 2027 46	Queens Park Rangers	v	Norwich City	Shepherd's Bush
12:30 BST				Stadium: Loftus Road

=== EFL Cup ===
QPR were drawn at home to Millwall in the first round.

8 August 2026 First round	Queens Park Rangers	1–1 (0–2 p)	Millwall	Shepherd's Bush
14:00 BST	Sykes 86' (o.g.)	Report	Cundle 53'	Stadium: Loftus Road; Attendance: 9,759 (1,748 away); Referee: Matt Donohue
	Penalties
	Chair (penalty missed); Vale (penalty missed); Saitō (penalty missed); Poku (penalty missed)		(penalty scored) Cooper; (penalty scored) Sykes; (penalty missed) Neghli; (penalty missed) Arconte

== Statistics ==
=== Appearances ===
As of match played 22 November 2026

Players with no appearances are not included on the list, italics indicate a loaned in player

No.	Pos	Nat	Player	Total		Championship		FA Cup		EFL Cup	
No.	Pos	Nat	Player	Apps	Goals	Apps	Goals	Apps	Goals	Apps	Goals
1	GK	(Northern Ireland) NIR	Pierce Charles	17	0	16+0	0	0+0	0	1+0	0
2	DF	(Australia) AUS	Kealey Adamson	16	0	10+5	0	0+0	0	0+1	0
3	DF	(Republic of Ireland) IRL	Jimmy Dunne	15	3	14+0	3	0+0	0	1+0	0
5	DF	(England) ENG	Ronnie Edwards	17	0	16+0	0	0+0	0	1+0	0
6	DF	(England) ENG	Jake Clarke-Salter	10	0	8+2	0	0+0	0	0+0	0
7	MF	(Scotland) SCO	Karamoko Dembele	5	0	0+5	0	0+0	0	0+0	0
10	MF	(Morocco) MAR	Ilias Chair	10	2	5+4	2	0+0	0	1+0	0
11	FW	(Northern Ireland) NIR	Paul Smyth	16	3	12+3	3	0+0	0	1+0	0
12	DF	(Netherlands) NED	Boy Kemper	9	0	7+1	0	0+0	0	1+0	0
14	FW	(Japan) JPN	Kōki Saitō	13	1	4+8	1	0+0	0	0+1	0
15	FW	(England) ENG	Alfie Lloyd	9	1	3+5	1	0+0	0	0+1	0
16	FW	(Jamaica) JAM	Rumarn Burrell	10	2	6+3	2	0+0	0	1+0	0
17	FW	(Ghana) GHA	Kwame Poku	14	1	10+3	1	0+0	0	0+1	0
18	MF	(Finland) FIN	Glen Kamara	15	1	11+4	1	0+0	0	0+0	0
19	DF	(Latvia) LAT	Dennis Cirkin	12	0	6+6	0	0+0	0	0+0	0
20	MF	(Republic of Ireland) IRL	Harvey Vale	14	1	12+1	1	0+0	0	1+0	0
22	FW	(Ivory Coast) CIV	Richard Kone	12	5	8+3	5	0+0	0	1+0	0
23	MFW	(Sweden) SWE	Isak Alemayehu	1	0	0+1	0	0+0	0	0+0	0
24	MF	(Denmark) DEN	Nicolas Madsen	11	3	7+3	3	0+0	0	1+0	0
25	FW	(Trinidad and Tobago) TTO	Justin Obikwu	3	0	0+3	0	0+0	0	0+0	0
26	FW	(Algeria) ALG	Rayan Kolli	5	0	3+2	0	0+0	0	0+0	0
27	DF	(Senegal) SEN	Amadou Mbengue	11	0	7+3	0	0+0	0	1+0	0
33	MF	(Wales) WAL	Leon Scarlett	5	0	1+4	0	0+0	0	0+0	0
40	MF	(Martinique) MTQ	Jonathan Varane	12	1	6+5	1	0+0	0	0+1	0
48	DF	(Ghana) GHA	Tariq Lamptey	6	0	2+4	0	0+0	0	0+0	0

=== Goals ===
As of match played 22 November 2026

Rank	Player	Pos.	Championship	FA Cup	EFL Cup	Total
1	(Ivory Coast) Richard Kone	FW	5	0	0	5
2	(Northern Ireland) Paul Smyth	MF	3	0	0	3
2	(Republic of Ireland) Jimmy Dunne	DF	3	0	0	3
4	(Jamaica) Rumarn Burrell	FW	2	0	0	2
4	(Morocco) Ilias Chair	MF	2	0	0	2
4	(Denmark) Nicolas Madsen	MF	3	0	0	3
7	(England) Alfie Lloyd	FW	1	0	0	1
7	(Finland) Glen Kamara	MF	1	0	0	1
7	(Ghana) Kwame Poku	MF	1	0	0	1
7	(Martinique) Jonathan Varane	MF	1	0	0	1
7	(Republic of Ireland) Harvey Vale	MF	1	0	0	1
7	(Japan) Kōki Saitō	MF	1	0	0	1
Own goal			1	0	1	2
Total			25	0	1	26

=== Clean sheets ===
As of match played 22 November 2026

Rank	Player	Pos.	Championship	FA Cup	EFL Cup	Total
1	(Northern Ireland) Pierce Charles	GK	4	0	0	4
Total			4	0	0	4

== Awards ==
=== EFL awards ===
==== EFL Championship Manager of the Month ====
Month	Manager	Result	Ref.
August	(France) Julien Stéphan	Nominated	
