= Leon Scarlett =

English association football player (born 2009)

Personal information
- Date of birth: 16 August 2009 (age 17)
- Position: Midfielder

Team information
- Current team: Queens Park Rangers
- Number: 33

Youth career
- –2025: Arsenal
- 2025–2026: Queens Park Rangers

Senior career*
Years	Team	Apps	(Gls)
2026–	Queens Park Rangers	4	(0)

International career^{‡}
2025	Wales U16	4	(0)
2025–	Wales U17	7	(3)
- * Club domestic league appearances and goals as of 01:01, 27 September 2026 (UTC) ‡ National team caps and goals as of 01:01, 27 September 2026 (UTC)

Leon Jayden Scarlett (born 16 August 2009) is a Welsh professional footballer who plays as a midfielder for EFL Championship club Queens Park Rangers.

== Club career ==
Scarlett began his career with Arsenal before joining Queens Park Rangers in January 2025.

On 2 May 2026, the final day of the 2025–26 season, he made his senior debut for the club, coming on as a substitute in a 3–0 away defeat to Ipswich Town. Prior to his debut he had featured in a number of matchday squad having impressed first-team manager Julien Stéphan with his performances for the under-21s squad.

On 9 September 2026, he made his first appearance of the 2026–27 season, replacing Alfie Lloyd in the 79th minute of a 0–0 draw with Charlton Athletic. Ten days later, Scarlett made his first start for the club in a 2–2 draw with Preston North End, playing the first 45 minutes before being substituted at half-time.

In November 2026, Scarlett was the subject of reported interest from Bundesliga club Eintracht Frankfurt and Serie A club AC Milan. Although manager Stéphan admitted that he was unsure on the extent of truth to the rumours, he said that "if it's [reported interest] the case, I think it's a good thing for the club, for the academy as well".

== International career ==
Scarlett has represented the Wales at both under-16 and under-17 levels, most recently featuring for the under-17s in April 2026. On 17 September 2026, he received his first call-up to the Wales under-21 squad.

== Career statistics ==
As of match played 2 May 2026

Appearances and goals by club, season and competition
Club	Season	League			FA Cup		EFL Cup		Other		Total	
Club	Season	Division	Apps	Goals	Apps	Goals	Apps	Goals	Apps	Goals	Apps	Goals
Queens Park Rangers	2025–26	Championship	1	0	0	0	0	0	—		1	0
Queens Park Rangers	2026–27	Championship	3	0	0	0	0	0	—		3	0
Career total			4	0	0	0	0	0	0	0	4	0
