= Nicolas Madsen =

Danish footballer (born 2000)

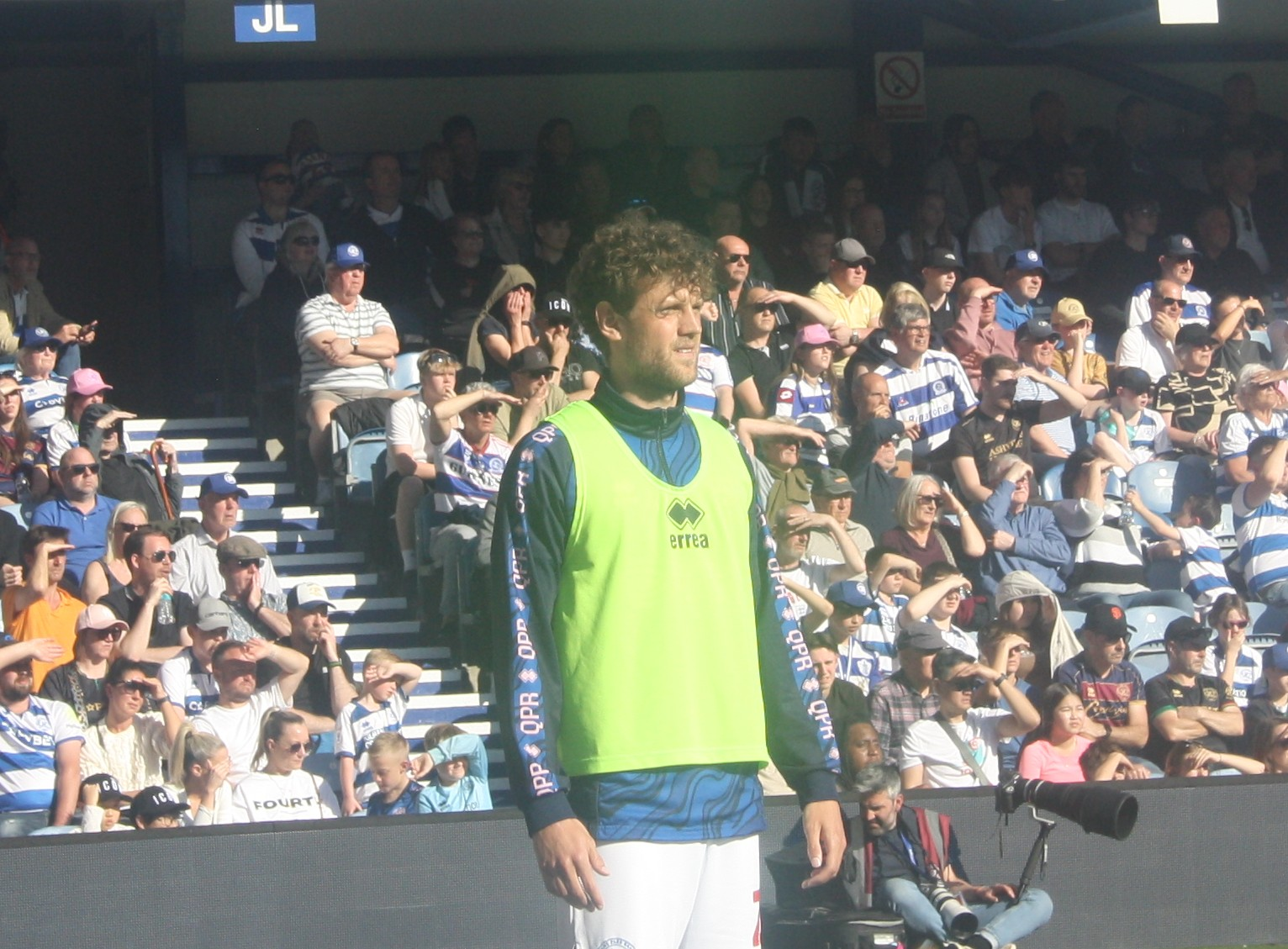
- Madsen in 2025

Personal information
- Full name: Nicolas Martin Hautorp Madsen
- Date of birth: 17 March 2000 (age 26)
- Place of birth: Odense, Denmark
- Height: 1.94 m (6 ft 4 in)
- Position: Midfielder

Team information
- Current team: Queens Park Rangers
- Number: 24

Youth career
- 2003–2011: Marienlyst
- 2011–2015: Næsby
- 2015–2020: Midtjylland

Senior career*
Years	Team	Apps	(Gls)
2018–2022	Midtjylland	30	(0)
2021–2022	→ Heerenveen (loan)	25	(0)
2022–2024	Westerlo	74	(16)
2024–	Queens Park Rangers	77	(7)

International career^{‡}
2017	Denmark U17	5	(1)
2017–2018	Denmark U18	6	(0)
2018–2019	Denmark U19	13	(2)
2019–2022	Denmark U21	9	(0)
- * Club domestic league appearances and goals as of 22:56, 9 October 2026 (UTC) ‡ National team caps and goals as of 27 September 2022

Nicolas Martin Hautorp Madsen (born 17 March 2000) is a Danish professional footballer who plays as a midfielder for EFL Championship club Queens Park Rangers.

== Club career ==
=== Early years ===
Madsen started playing football at the age of three in local club Marienlyst and later joined Næsby. In November 2014 it was confirmed that Madsen, who already earlier had been on trials at Midtjylland and also Brøndby, would join Midtjylland from the summer 2015. On his 15th birthday, he signed a three-year youth contract with the club. In 2017, he extended his contract until the summer 2019.

=== Midtjylland ===
On 28 November 2018, 18-year old Madsen got his official debut for Midtjylland. Madsen started on the bench, but replaced Mayron George with 14 minutes left against Dalum IF in the Danish Cup. In September 2019, he got his Danish Superliga debut against Lyngby Boldklub.

On 31 August 2021, Madsen was loaned out to Eredivisie club SC Heerenveen for the 2021–22 season.

=== Westerlo ===
After returning to Midtjylland from his loan spell, Madsen was sold to Belgian football; K.V.C. Westerlo confirmed on 20 July 2022, that Madsen had signed a deal until June 2026.

=== Queens Park Rangers ===
On 23 August 2024, Madsen signed for EFL Championship club Queens Park Rangers for an undisclosed fee.

Following an impressive second campaign with the club, he was named Queens Park Rangers Player of the Season for the 2025–26 season.

== Career statistics ==
As of match played 9 October 2026

Appearances and goals by club, season and competition
Club	Season	League			National cup (Note: Includes Danish Cup, KNVB Cup, Belgian Cup, FA Cup)		League cup (Note: Includes EFL Cup)		Europe		Total	
Club	Season	Division	Apps	Goals	Apps	Goals	Apps	Goals	Apps	Goals	Apps	Goals
Midtjylland	2019–20	Danish Superliga	9	0	0	0	—		—		9	0
Midtjylland	2020–21	Danish Superliga	17	0	3	0	—		4 (Note: Appearances in UEFA Champions League)	0	24	0
Midtjylland	2021–22	Danish Superliga	4	0	0	0	—		1	0	5	0
Midtjylland	Total		30	0	3	0	0	0	5	0	38	0
Heerenveen (loan)	2021–22	Eredivisie	26	0	2	0	—		—		28	0
Westerlo	2022–23	Belgian Pro League	36	2	1	0	—		—		37	2
Westerlo	2023–24	Belgian Pro League	34	13	1	1	—		—		35	14
Westerlo	2024–25	Belgian Pro League	4	1	0	0	—		—		4	1
Westerlo	Total		74	16	2	1	0	0	0	0	76	17
Queens Park Rangers	2024–25	EFL Championship	31	3	1	0	2	0	—		34	3
Queens Park Rangers	2025–26	EFL Championship	38	3	1	0	0	0	—		39	3
Queens Park Rangers	2026–27	EFL Championship	8	1	0	0	1	0	—		9	1
Queens Park Rangers	Total		77	7	2	0	3	0	0	0	82	7
Career total			207	23	9	1	3	0	5	0	224	24

== Honours ==
Individual

- Queens Park Rangers Player of the Year: 2025–26
