= Kōki Saitō (footballer) =

Japanese footballer (born 2001)

Kōki Saitō 斉藤 光毅
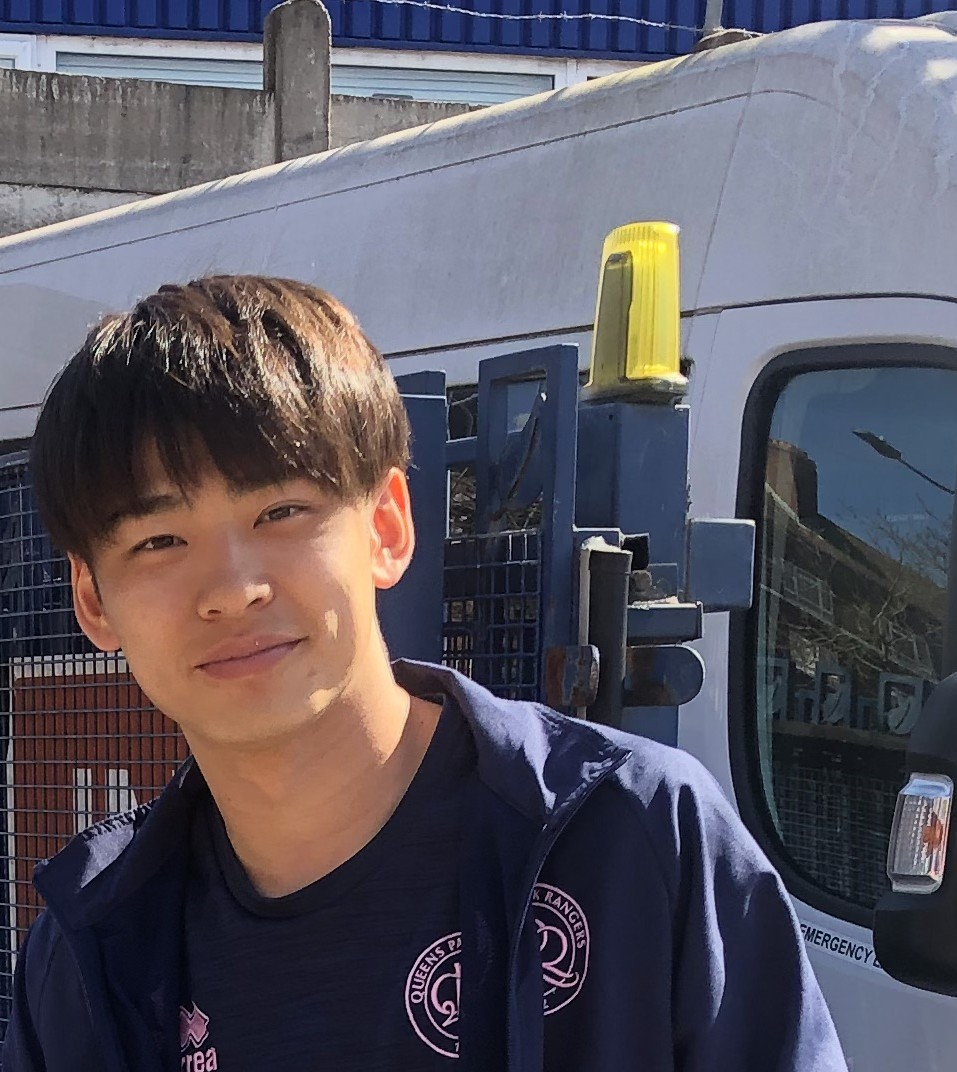
- Saitō in 2025.

Personal information
- Full name: Kōki Saitō
- Date of birth: 10 August 2001 (age 25)
- Place of birth: Tokyo, Japan
- Height: 1.70 m (5 ft 7 in)
- Position: Winger

Team information
- Current team: Queens Park Rangers
- Number: 14

Youth career
- 2008–2013: Inukura SC
- 2014–2018: Yokohama FC

Senior career*
Years	Team	Apps	(Gls)
2018–2020	Yokohama FC	63	(9)
2021–2025	Lommel	29	(5)
2022–2024	→ Sparta Rotterdam (loan)	47	(10)
2024–2025	→ Queens Park Rangers (loan)	39	(3)
2025–	Queens Park Rangers	36	(4)

International career^{‡}
2017	Japan U16	7	(7)
2017–2018	Japan U17	8	(9)
2018	Japan U18	4	(0)
2018	Japan U19	5	(3)
2019	Japan U20	6	(1)
2022	Japan U21	5	(1)
2022	Japan U23	6	(1)
2025–	Japan	1	(0)
Medal record
Representing Japan
AFC U-19 Championship
Bronze medal – third place	2018
- * Club domestic league appearances and goals as of 03:22, 31 August 2026 (UTC) ‡ National team caps and goals as of 14:39, 10 October 2025 (UTC)

Kōki Saitō (斉藤 光毅, Saitō Kōki; born 10 August 2001) is a Japanese professional footballer who plays as a winger for EFL Championship side Queens Park Rangers and the Japan national team.

== Club career ==
After impressive performances with the Japan U-17 team, Kōki Saitō debuted on 21 July 2018 in a league match against FC Gifu. On his debut, Saitō even had the chance to share the field with Kazuyoshi Miura, who is 34 years his senior.

In January 2021, he joined Belgian First Division B side Lommel. In summer 2022 he was loaned to Eredivisie side Sparta. The loan was extended for the 2023–24 season.

On 13 August 2024, Saitō joined EFL Championship club Queens Park Rangers on a season-long loan deal. He made his debut with the club on 17 August, coming on as 67th minute substitute. In the 88th minute of the same match, he assisted Lyndon Dykes to earn 10-man QPR a draw away to Sheffield United. On 26 August 2025, he joined QPR on a permanent basis.

== Career statistics ==
=== Club ===
As of match played 29 August 2026

Appearances and goals by club, season and competition
Club	Season	League			National cup (Note: Includes Emperor's Cup, Belgian Cup, KNVB Cup, FA Cup)		League cup (Note: Includes J. League Cup, EFL Cup)		Continental		Other		Total	
Club	Season	Division	Apps	Goals	Apps	Goals	Apps	Goals	Apps	Goals	Apps	Goals	Apps	Goals
Yokohama FC	2018	J2 League	2	0	0	0	0	0	0	0	—		2	0
Yokohama FC	2019	J2 League	29	6	2	0	0	0	0	0	—		31	6
Yokohama FC	2020	J1 League	32	3	0	0	2	0	—		—		34	3
Yokohama FC	Total		63	9	2	0	2	0	—		—		67	9
Lommel SK	2020–21	Challenger Pro League	9	0	1	0	–		—		—		10	0
Lommel SK	2021–22	Challenger Pro League	20	5	2	1	–		—		—		22	6
Lommel SK	Total		29	5	3	1	–		—		—		32	6
Sparta Rotterdam (loan)	2022–23	Eredivisie	30	7	2	0	—		—		0	0	32	7
Sparta Rotterdam (loan)	2023–24	Eredivisie	20	3	0	0	–		—		1 (Note: Appearances in Eredivisie European Play-offs)	0	21	3
Sparta Rotterdam (loan)	Total		50	10	2	0	–		–		1	0	53	10
Queens Park Rangers (loan)	2024–25	EFL Championship	39	3	1	0	2	0	—		—		42	3
Queens Park Rangers	2025–26	EFL Championship	34	3	1	0	—		—		—		35	3
Queens Park Rangers	2026–27	EFL Championship	2	1	0	0	1	0	—		—		3	1
Queens Park Rangers	Total		36	4	1	0	1	0	—		—		38	4
Career total			217	31	9	1	5	0	0	0	1	0	233	32

== Honours ==
Individual

- Eredivisie Team of the Month: March 2023,
