= Harvey Vale =

Irish footballer

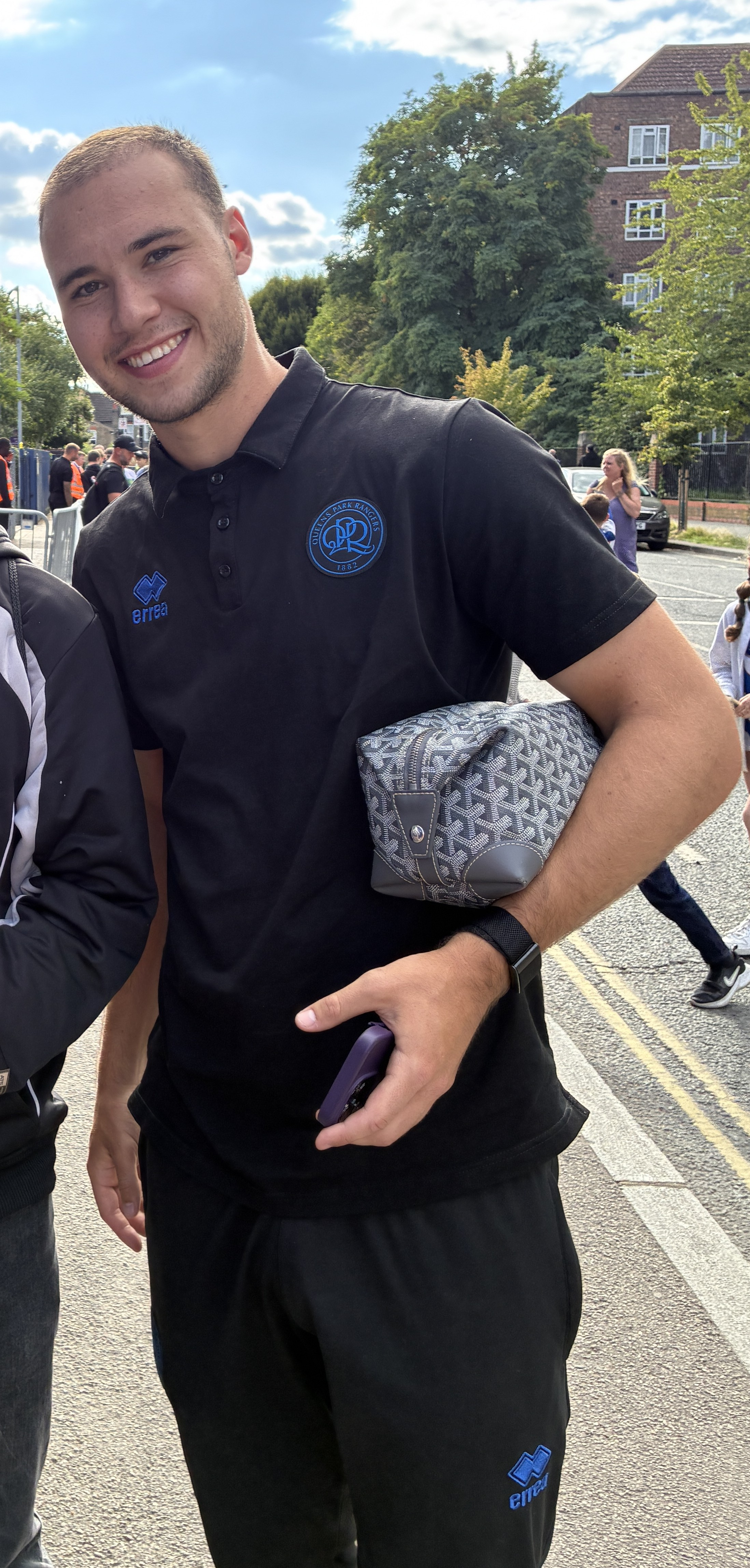
- Vale in 2025

Personal information
- Full name: Harvey James Vale
- Date of birth: 11 September 2003 (age 23)
- Place of birth: Haywards Heath, England
- Height: 1.80 m (5 ft 11 in)
- Positions: Attacking midfielder; forward; full-back; wing-back

Team information
- Current team: Queens Park Rangers
- Number: 20

Youth career
- 2009–2010: Crowborough
- 2010–2016: Fulham
- 2016–2021: Chelsea

Senior career*
Years	Team	Apps	(Gls)
2021–2025	Chelsea	0	(0)
2022–2023	→ Hull City (loan)	2	(0)
2023–2024	→ Bristol Rovers (loan)	39	(2)
2025–	Queens Park Rangers	39	(5)

International career^{‡}
2017–2018	England U15	3	(1)
2018	England U16	1	(0)
2020	England U17	3	(1)
2021–2022	England U19	15	(1)
2022–2023	England U20	9	(1)
2026–	Republic of Ireland	4	(0)
Medal record
Men's football
Representing England
UEFA European Under-19 Championship
Winner	2022 Slovakia
- * Club domestic league appearances and goals as of 17:08, 15 October 2026 (UTC) ‡ National team caps and goals as of 23:23, 17 November 2026 (UTC)

Harvey James Vale (born 11 September 2003) is a professional footballer who plays as an attacking midfielder or forward for EFL Championship club Queens Park Rangers. Born in England, he plays for the Republic of Ireland national team.

== Early life ==
Born in Haywards Heath, West Sussex, Vale started his career at local side Crowborough Athletic, before joining West London side Fulham. Initially a left-back, Vale played a number of positions at youth level, including covering for an injured goalkeeper for Fulham, before settling as a midfielder.

== Club career ==
=== Chelsea ===
Vale left Fulham to join West London rivals Chelsea at under-13 level, and signed his first professional contract in September 2020.

Vale made his Chelsea debut on 22 December 2021 in the quarter-final of the EFL Cup, starting in a 2–0 win against Brentford. On 19 March 2022, he featured in an FA Cup quarter-final match against Middlesbrough, coming on as a substitute for Romelu Lukaku in the 84th minute as Chelsea went on to win the game 2–0.

On 22 May 2022, he was awarded the academy player of the year.

==== Loan to Hull City ====
On 1 September 2022, he moved on loan to Hull City for the season after signing a three-year contract with Chelsea. On 17 September 2022, Vale started in the 3–0 loss away to Swansea City. The loan spell was cut short when he returned to Chelsea on 23 January 2023.

==== Loan to Bristol Rovers ====
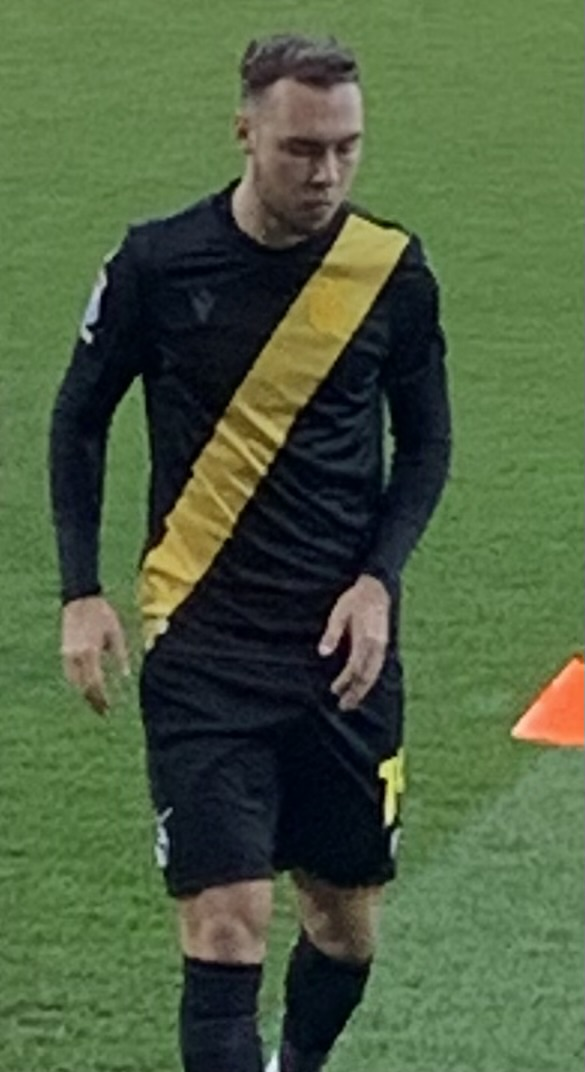
Vale with Bristol Rovers in 2023

On 15 August 2023, Vale agreed to join League One side, Bristol Rovers on a season-long loan. On 26 August 2023, Vale scored his first senior career goal, finishing a cross from the right-hand side for Rovers' consolation goal in a 2–1 home defeat to Wycombe Wanderers. Having been utilised in a more unfamiliar left-back position, impressive performances from Vale saw comparisons made to Chelsea legend Ashley Cole from manager Joey Barton. He continued to impress across the season, ranking among the highest for minutes played by a Chelsea loanee, whilst also playing the second-most minutes for Rovers.

==== Return to Chelsea ====
Following his return to Chelsea, Vale was one of thirteen senior players who was told to train away from the first-team and seek a move away from the club. With just days of the transfer window remaining, it was reported that Chelsea had agreed a deal with Saudi Pro League club Al-Ettifaq, the move seeming to fall through having been unable to agree personal terms.

=== Queens Park Rangers ===
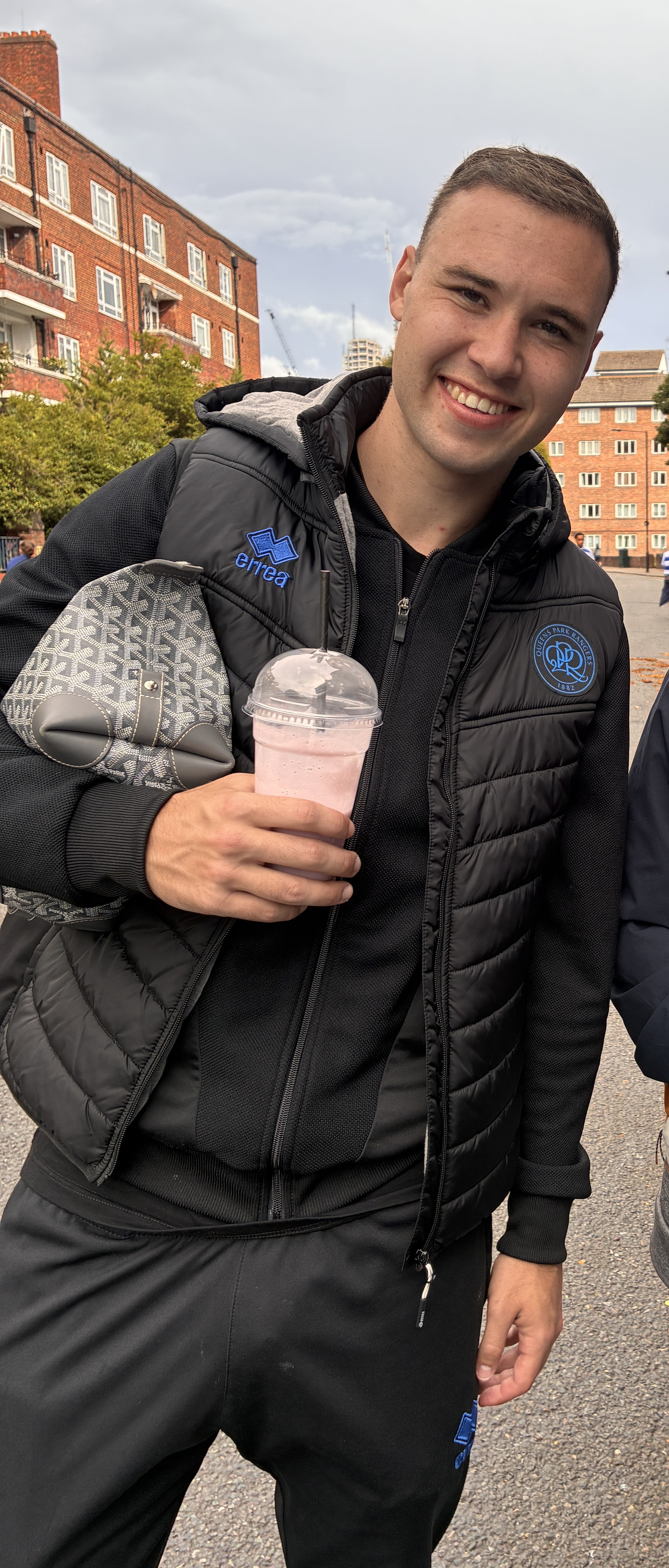
Vale with Queens Park Rangers in 2025

On 3 February 2025, Vale joined Championship side Queens Park Rangers on a permanent deal for an undisclosed fee.

He made his debut on 9 August 2025 replacing Karamoko Dembélé in the 82nd minute in a 1–1 draw with Preston North End at Loftus Road.

On 18 September 2025 he was named as the 1209th player to play for Queens Park Rangers.

== International career ==
Vale has represented England at under-15, under-16, under-17 and under-19 level.

On 17 June 2022, Vale was included in the England U19 squad for the 2022 UEFA European Under-19 Championship. On 1 July 2022, Vale captained the England U19 side and provided an assist for Carney Chukwuemeka to score in a 3–1 victory against Israel in the final. His performances during the competition led to his inclusion in the UEFA team of the tournament.

On 10 May 2023, Vale was included in the England squad for the 2023 FIFA U-20 World Cup.

Vale qualifies for the Republic of Ireland as his grandfather was born in Kerry before moving to London.

On 13 March 2026, Vale received approval from FIFA to switch his international allegiance to the Republic of Ireland. The following week he received his first call up, for the 2026 FIFA World Cup play-offs. He made his debut for Republic of Ireland against Czechia on 26 March 2026.

== Career statistics ==
=== Club ===
As of 14 October 2026

Appearances and goals by club, season and competition
Club	Season	League			FA Cup		League Cup		Europe		Other		Total	
Club	Season	Division	Apps	Goals	Apps	Goals	Apps	Goals	Apps	Goals	Apps	Goals	Apps	Goals
Chelsea U21	2020–21	—			—		—		—		1 (Note: Appearances in EFL Trophy)	0	1	0
Chelsea U21	2021–22	—			—		—		—		2	0	2	0
Chelsea U21	2022–23	—			—		—		—		1	0	1	0
Chelsea U21	2023–24	—			—		—		—		0	0	0	0
Chelsea U21	2024–25	—			—		—		—		3	2	3	2
Chelsea U21	Total		0	0	0	0	0	0	0	0	7	2	7	2
Chelsea	2021–22	Premier League	0	0	3	0	2	0	0	0	0	0	5	0
Chelsea	2024–25	Premier League	0	0	0	0	0	0	2 (Note: Appearances in UEFA Conference League)	0	0	0	2	0
Chelsea	Total		0	0	3	0	2	0	2	0	0	0	7	0
Hull City (loan)	2022–23	Championship	2	0	1	0	0	0	—		—		3	0
Bristol Rovers (loan)	2023–24	League One	39	2	4	1	—		—		4	0	47	3
Queens Park Rangers	2025–26	Championship	31	4	0	0	1	0	—		—		32	4
Queens Park Rangers	2026–27	Championship	8	1	0	0	1	0	—		0	0	9	1
Queens Park Rangers	Total		39	5	0	0	2	0	—		0	0	41	5
Career total			80	7	8	1	4	0	2	0	11	2	105	10

=== International ===
As of match played on 17 November 2026

Appearances and goals by national team and year
National team	Year	Apps	Goals
Republic of Ireland
Republic of Ireland	2026	4	0
Total		4	0

== Honours ==
England U19

- UEFA European Under-19 Championship: 2022

Individual

- Chelsea Academy Player of the Season: 2021–22
- UEFA European Under-19 Championship Team of the Tournament: 2022
