= Rumarn Burrell =

Jamaican footballer (born 2000)

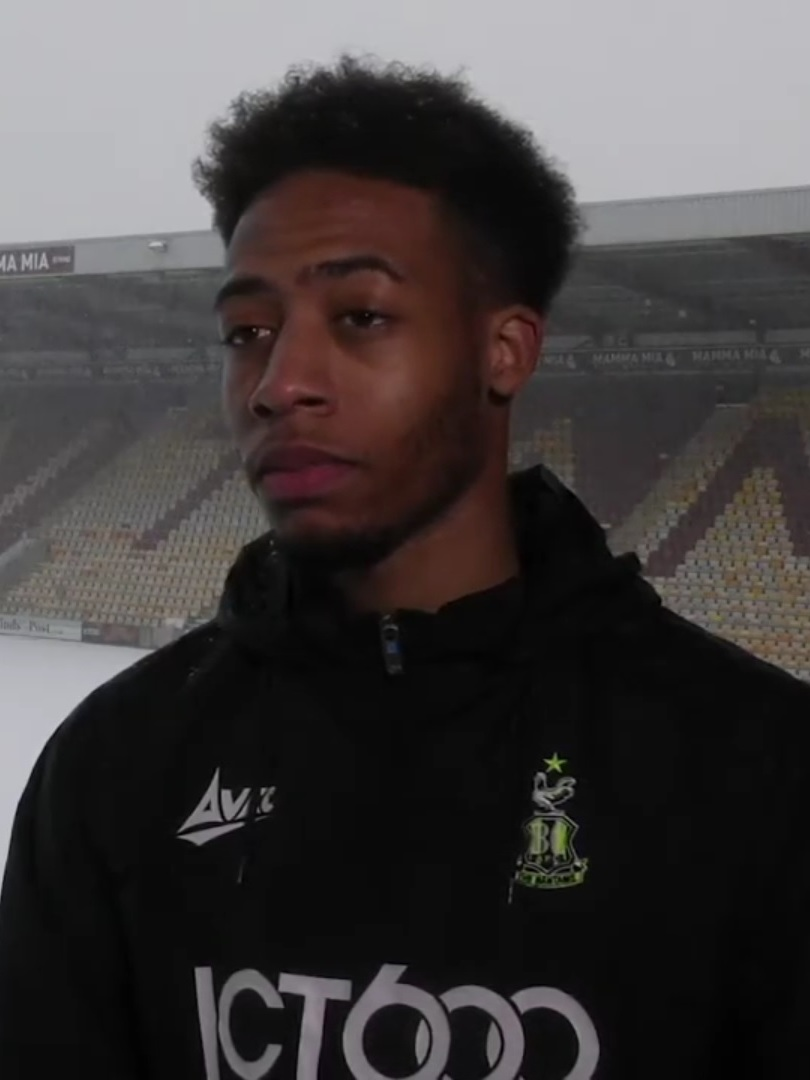
- Burrell in January 2021

Personal information
- Full name: Rumarn Kameron-Scott Burrell
- Date of birth: 16 December 2000 (age 25)
- Place of birth: Birmingham, England
- Height: 5 ft 11 in (1.80 m)
- Position: Forward

Team information
- Current team: Queens Park Rangers
- Number: 16

Youth career
- Coventry City
- Scunthorpe United
- 2017–2019: Grimsby Town

Senior career*
Years	Team	Apps	(Gls)
2019	Grimsby Town	4	(0)
2019–2022	Middlesbrough	0	(0)
2021	→ Bradford City (loan)	2	(0)
2021–2022	→ Kilmarnock (loan)	6	(0)
2022–2023	Falkirk	30	(9)
2023–2024	Cove Rangers	34	(21)
2024–2025	Burton Albion	30	(11)
2025–	Queens Park Rangers	39	(12)

International career^{‡}
2025–	Jamaica	6	(2)
- * Club domestic league appearances and goals as of 17:02, 19 September 2026 (UTC) ‡ National team caps and goals as of 23:32, 25 September 2026 (UTC)

Rumarn Kameron-Scott Burrell (born 16 December 2000) is a professional footballer who plays as a forward for EFL Championship club Queens Park Rangers. Born in England, he plays for the Jamaica national team.

Burrell was initially part of the youth academies of Coventry City and Scunthorpe United before joining Grimsby Town's academy in 2017. He turned professional with Grimsby in 2019 and made four league appearances before signing for EFL Championship side Middlesbrough. He has since spent time on loan with Bradford City and Kilmarnock. Before moving to Scotland with Falkirk then onto Cove Rangers. Burrell returned to English football with Burton Albion in 2024. On 26 July 2025, he moved to Queens Park Rangers for an undisclosed fee.

== Early life ==
Burrell was born in Birmingham.

== Career ==
=== Grimsby Town ===
Burrell played youth football for Coventry City and Scunthorpe United before joining Grimsby Town's academy in 2017. He made his senior debut on 6 April 2019 in a 2–0 defeat at home to Stevenage, before going on to make a further four League Two appearances for Grimsby Town in the 2018–19 season. He was offered his first professional deal with Grimsby Town in April 2019.

=== Middlesbrough ===
He signed for Middlesbrough in summer 2019 for an undisclosed fee on a three-year contract. He made his Middlesbrough debut on 9 January 2021 as a substitute in a 2–1 FA Cup defeat away to Brentford. Burrell joined Bradford City on loan until the end of the season on 14 January 2021. He made two appearances whilst on loan at Bradford City.

On 30 July 2021, it was announced that Burrell had joined Kilmarnock on a season-long loan.

=== Falkirk ===
After Burrell's Middlesbrough contract expired in 2022, it was announced that he had signed for Scottish League One side Falkirk on a one-year contract.

=== Cove Rangers ===
On 16 June 2023, Burrell signed a one-year deal with fellow League One side Cove Rangers.

=== Burton Albion ===
On 26 June 2024, it was announced that Burrell had signed a three-year contract with EFL League One club Burton Albion upon expiry of his contract with Cove Rangers.

Following a slow start to his time with the club, a run of five goals in six matches, coinciding with a rise in form for the club, saw Burrell named EFL League One Player of the Month for January 2025.

=== Queens Park Rangers ===
On 26 July 2025, Burrell joined Championship club Queens Park Rangers for an undisclosed fee.

He made his debut on 9 August 2025 as a 67th minute substitute to replace Žan Celar in a 1–1 draw with Preston North End at Loftus Road. On 13 September 2025, he scored his first goal for the club in a 3–1 away victory over Wrexham. In January 2026, having scored ten goals across the first half of the season, he was ruled out until March after suffering a contact injury.

== International career ==
On 19 May 2025, Burrell made the preliminary 60-man squad for the Jamaica national team for the 2025 CONCACAF Gold Cup.

He was called up to the Jamaica national team for the 2025 Unity Cup and debuted on 28 May 2025 in the semi-final against Trinidad and Tobago in which he also scored his first goal.

== Career statistics ==
As of match played 19 September 2026

Appearances and goals by club, season and competition
Club	Season	League			National cup (Note: Includes FA Cup, Scottish Cup)		League cup (Note: Includes EFL Cup, Scottish League Cup)		Other		Total	
Club	Season	Division	Apps	Goals	Apps	Goals	Apps	Goals	Apps	Goals	Apps	Goals
Grimsby Town	2018–19	League Two	4	0	0	0	0	0	0	0	4	0
Middlesbrough	2019–20	Championship	0	0	0	0	0	0	0	0	0	0
Middlesbrough	2020–21	Championship	0	0	1	0	0	0	0	0	1	0
Middlesbrough	Total		0	0	1	0	0	0	0	0	1	0
Bradford City (loan)	2020–21	League Two	2	0	0	0	0	0	0	0	2	0
Kilmarnock (loan)	2021–22	Scottish Championship	6	0	1	0	0	0	2 (Note: Appearances in Scottish Challenge Cup)	0	9	0
Falkirk	2022–23	Scottish League One	30	9	4	2	1	0	4 (Note: Two appearances and one goal in Scottish Challenge Cup, two appearances in Scottish League One play-offs)	1	39	12
Cove Rangers	2023–24	Scottish League One	34	21	3	0	4	3	1	0	42	24
Burton Albion	2024–25	League One	30	11	0	0	1	0	3 (Note: Appearances in EFL Trophy)	0	34	11
Queens Park Rangers	2025–26	Championship	30	10	0	0	1	0	—		31	10
Queens Park Rangers	2026–27	Championship	8	2	0	0	1	0	0	0	8	2
Queens Park Rangers	Total		38	12	0	0	2	0	0	0	39	12
Career total			144	53	9	2	8	3	10	1	171	59

=== International ===
As of match played 25 September 2026

Appearances and goals by national team and year
National team	Year	Apps	Goals
Jamaica	2025	5	1
Jamaica	2026	1	1
Total		6	2

Jamaica score listed first, score column indicates score after each Burrell goal

List of international goals scored by Rumarn Burrell
No.	Date	Venue	Opponent	Score	Result	Competition
1	28 May 2025	Brentford Community Stadium, London, England	Trinidad and Tobago	2–0	3–2	2025 Unity Cup
2	25 September 2026	Independence Park, Kingston, Jamaica	Guatemala	2–1	3–2	2026–27 CONCACAF Nations League A

== Honours ==
Individual

- PFA Scotland Team of the Year: 2023–24 Scottish League One
- EFL League One Player of the Month: January 2025
