= Rayan Kolli =

Algerian footballer (born 2005)

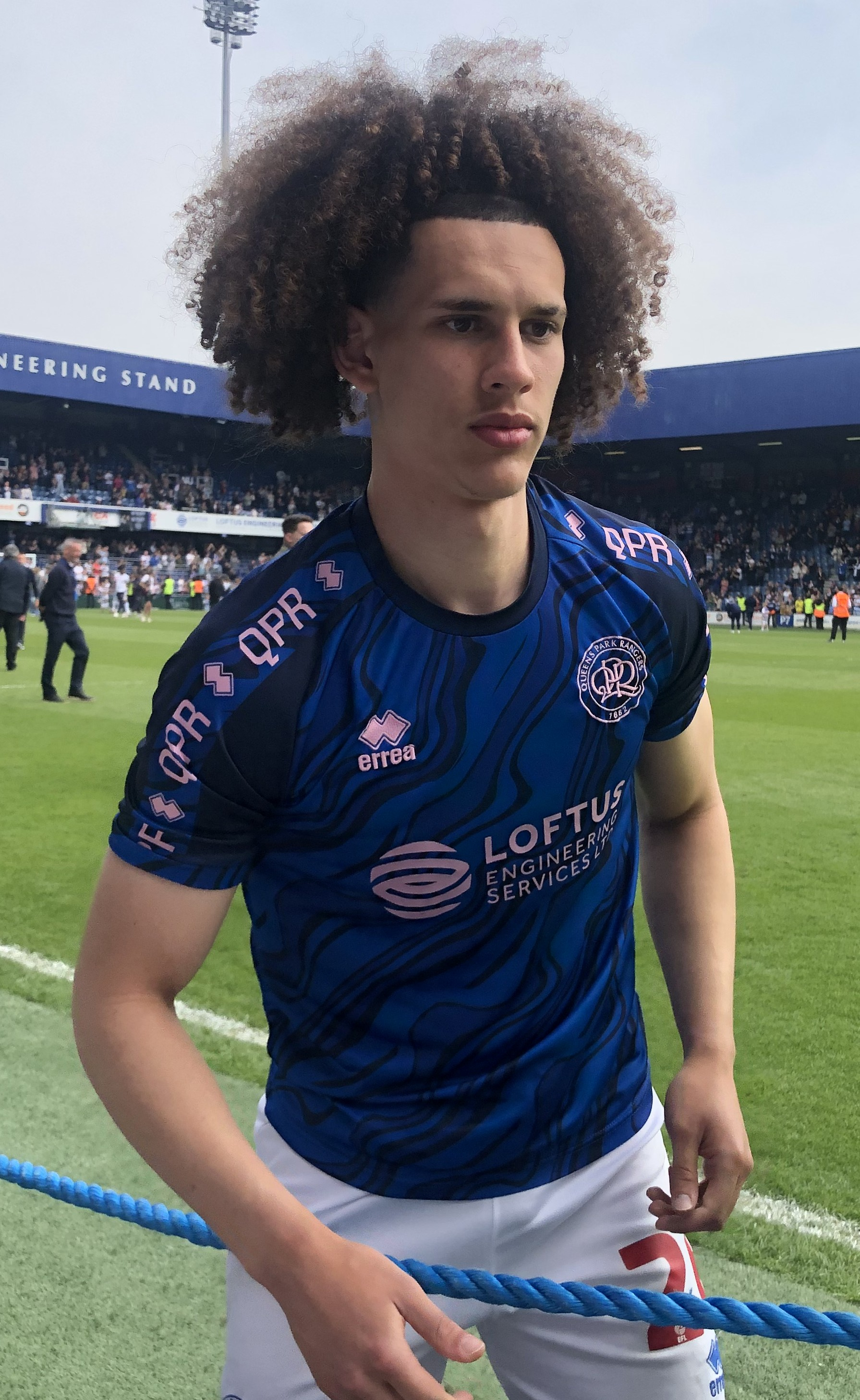
- Kolli in 2025

Personal information
- Full name: Rayan Jawad Kolli
- Date of birth: 10 February 2005 (age 21)
- Place of birth: Hounslow, England
- Height: 1.80 m (5 ft 11 in)
- Position: Forward

Team information
- Current team: Queens Park Rangers
- Number: 26

Youth career
- 2013–2023: Queens Park Rangers

Senior career*
Years	Team	Apps	(Gls)
2023–	Queens Park Rangers	54	(9)

International career
2023–2024	Algeria U20	5	(3)
2025	Algeria A	1	(0)
- * Club domestic league appearances and goals as of 00:26, 10 October 2026 (UTC)

Rayan Jawad Kolli (Arabic: ريان جواد كولي; born 10 February 2005) is a professional footballer who plays as a forward for EFL Championship club Queens Park Rangers. Born in England, he represented Algeria at youth level.

== Club career ==
Kolli signed for the Queens Park Rangers youth academy aged eight. He signed his first professional contract for the club in January 2023.

Kolli featured for Queens Park Rangers U18 in a 3–1 victory against Tottenham Hotspur U18 in the third round of the FA Youth Cup on 29 December 2022. During the match, he created several attacking opportunities and had a close-range effort blocked early in the game as QPR progressed to the next round.

On 16 August 2023, he came on as a substitute in the 64th minute to make his professional debut in the first round of the EFL Cup against Norwich City.

On 7 December 2024, Kolli scored his first senior goals with a brace in a 3–0 victory over Norwich City, a first home league victory of the season for the Rs.

On 4 January 2026, Kolli scored a brace in a 3–0 victory over Sheffield Wednesday in his first appearance since August after being snubbed from the first team squad by manager Julien Stephan.

At the conclusion of the 2025–26 season, Kolli officially joined the first team dressing room after reaching 1800 professional minutes played.

== International career ==
Born in England, Kolli is of Algerian descent. He was called up to the Algeria under-17 squad for the 2021 U-17 Africa Cup of Nations, but the tournament was cancelled.

Kolli made his senior debut for Algeria in their Algeria ‘A’ side’s 3–0 win over Palestine.

== Personal life ==
Kolli was born in London and is of Algerian descent. He joined the academy of Queens Park Rangers at the age of eight and has described progressing through the club's youth system as a major part of his upbringing. This led to him becoming a supporter of the club.

Kolli is a Muslim.

Outside football, Kolli has spoken about the importance of family support during his development as a player.

== Style of play ==
Kolli primarily plays as a forward but is also capable of operating as a winger or attacking midfielder. He has been noted for his dribbling ability, close control, movement, and work rate both in and out of possession.

During his breakthrough into the Queens Park Rangers first team, Kolli received praise from head coach Martí Cifuentes for his energy, pressing, and versatility across the front line.

Kolli has also been recognised by supporters for his direct attacking style and confidence when taking on defenders.

== Honours ==
Queens Park Rangers U21

- Premier League Cup: 2024–25

Individual

- Queens Park Rangers Young Player of the Year: 2024–25
- Queens Park Rangers Academy Player of the Year: 2023–24

== Career statistics ==
As of match played 9 October 2026

Appearances and goals by club, season and competition
Club	Season	League			FA Cup		League Cup		Other		Total	
Club	Season	Division	Apps	Goals	Apps	Goals	Apps	Goals	Apps	Goals	Apps	Goals
Queens Park Rangers	2023–24	Championship	10	0	0	0	1	0	—		11	0
Queens Park Rangers	2024–25	Championship	20	4	1	1	0	0	—		21	5
Queens Park Rangers	2025–26	Championship	23	5	0	0	1	1	—		24	6
Queens Park Rangers	2026–27	Championship	1	0	0	0	0	0	—		1	0
Career total			54	9	1	1	2	1	—		57	11
