= Alfie Lloyd =

English footballer (born 2003)

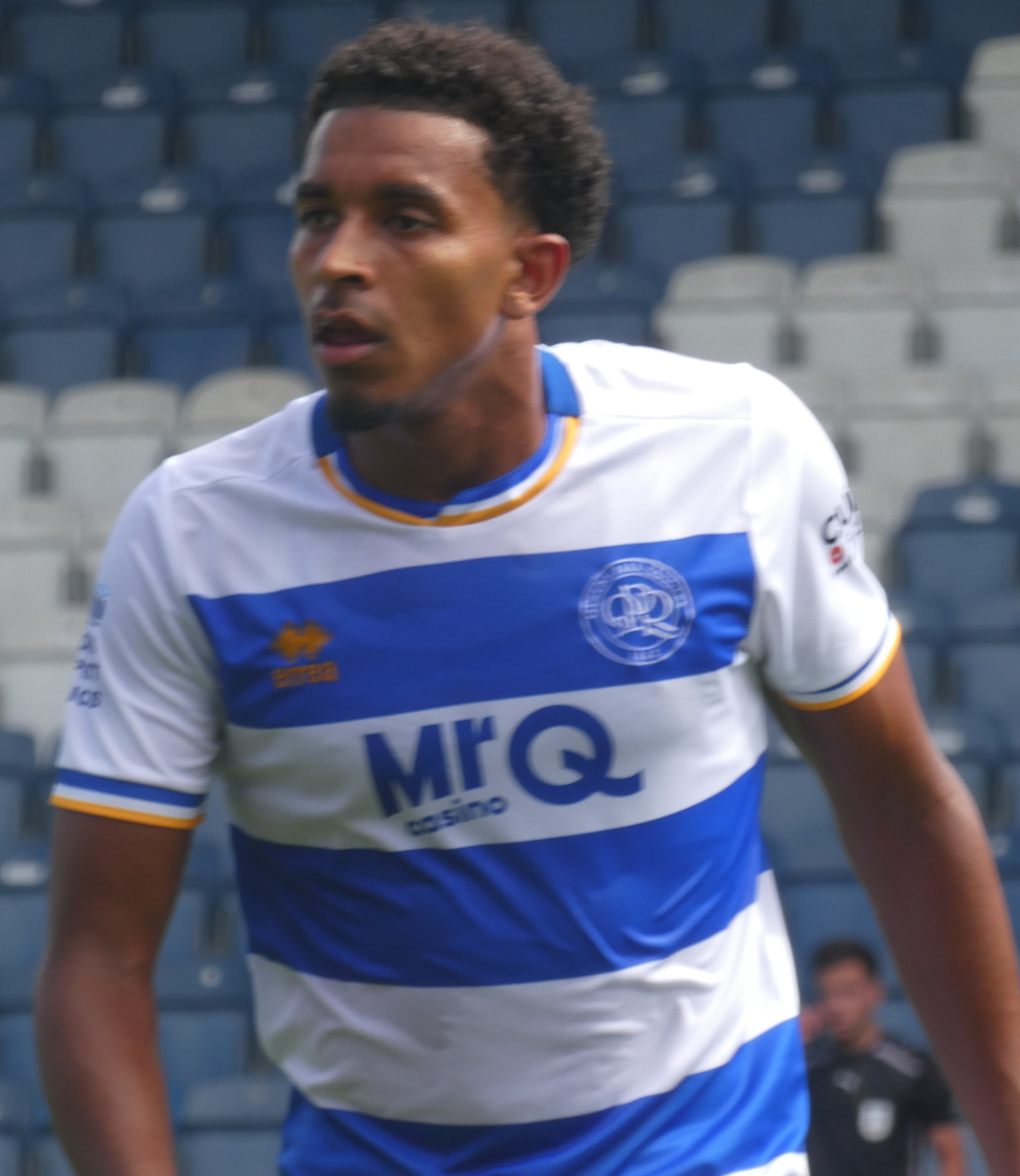
- Lloyd playing for Queens Park Rangers in 2026

Personal information
- Full name: Alfie David Lloyd
- Date of birth: 30 April 2003 (age 23)
- Place of birth: Yeovil, England
- Height: 1.80 m (5 ft 11 in)
- Position: Forward

Team information
- Current team: Queens Park Rangers
- Number: 15

Youth career
- –2021: Yeovil Town
- 2021–2024: Queens Park Rangers

Senior career*
Years	Team	Apps	(Gls)
2020–2021	Yeovil Town	1	(0)
2022–	Queens Park Rangers	34	(3)
2022–2023	→ Eastleigh (loan)	20	(5)
2025–2026	→ Leyton Orient (loan)	8	(0)
2026	→ Lincoln City (loan)	19	(1)
- * Club domestic league appearances and goals as of 17:19, 15 October 2026 (UTC)

Alfie David Lloyd (born 30 April 2003) is an English professional footballer who plays as a forward for EFL Championship club Queens Park Rangers.

== Early life ==
Lloyd was born in Yeovil and attended Preston School where he completed his GCSEs.

== Career ==
Lloyd progressed through the academy at hometown club Yeovil Town, signing a scholarship deal in July 2019.

On 20 November 2020, Lloyd made his National League debut as a late substitute in a 3–1 home league defeat to Hartlepool United, having previously featured for Yeovil in a Somerset Premier Cup tie.

=== Queens Park Rangers ===
In May 2021, Lloyd signed for Championship club Queens Park Rangers for an undisclosed fee plus add-ons, signing a three-year deal.

In November 2022, Lloyd joined National League side Eastleigh on an initial one-month loan deal. Having impressed new manager Lee Bradbury with his attitude, his loan was extended until the end of the season.

Having suffered from injuries across the 2023–24 season, Lloyd signed a new contract at the end of the campaign. On 10 August 2024, he made his debut for the club as a second-half substitute in a 3–1 opening day defeat to West Bromwich Albion. On 14 September 2024, Lloyd opened his scoring for the club with a 97th minute equaliser against Sheffield Wednesday, firing the ball home after a goalmouth scramble. In January 2025, he signed a new contract with the club.

On 8 August 2025, Lloyd joined League One club Leyton Orient on a season-long loan. He was recalled on 16 January 2026.

On 18th September 2025 He was named as the 1191st player to play for Queens Park Rangers with his debut on 10/08/2024.

On 19 January 2026, Lloyd joined League One club Lincoln City on loan for the remainder of the season. He made his debut for the Imps coming off the bench in a 2–1 victory against Burton Albion. He scored his first goal on 14 March, scoring the third in a 3–1 win against Stockport County.

On 30 August 2026, Lloyd signed a new contract with the club.

== Career statistics ==
As of match played 14 October 2026

Appearances and goals by club, season and competition
Club	Season	League			FA Cup		League Cup		Other		Total	
Club	Season	Division	Apps	Goals	Apps	Goals	Apps	Goals	Apps	Goals	Apps	Goals
Yeovil Town	2019–20	National League	0	0	0	0	—		1 (Note: Appearance in Somerset Premier Cup)	0	1	0
Yeovil Town	2020–21	National League	1	0	0	0	—		0	0	1	0
Yeovil Town	Total		1	0	0	0	—		1	0	2	0
Queens Park Rangers	2021–22	Championship	0	0	0	0	0	0	—		0	0
Queens Park Rangers	2022–23	Championship	0	0	0	0	0	0	—		0	0
Queens Park Rangers	2023–24	Championship	0	0	0	0	0	0	—		0	0
Queens Park Rangers	2024–25	Championship	27	2	1	0	3	0	—		31	2
Queens Park Rangers	2025–26	Championship	0	0	0	0	0	0	—		0	0
Queens Park Rangers	2026–27	Championship	7	1	0	0	1	0	—		8	1
Queens Park Rangers	Total		34	3	1	0	4	0	0	0	39	3
Eastleigh (loan)	2022–23	National League	20	5	0	0	—		3 (Note: Appearance(s) in FA Trophy)	0	23	5
Leyton Orient (loan)	2025–26	League One	8	0	2	0	0	0	2 (Note: Appearances in EFL Trophy)	0	12	0
Lincoln City (loan)	2025–26	League One	19	1	0	0	0	0	0	0	19	1
Career total			82	9	3	0	4	0	6	0	95	9

== Honours ==
Lincoln City

- EFL League One: 2025–26
