= Queens Park Rangers F.C. =

Association football club in London, England

Queens Park Rangers
- Full name: Queens Park Rangers Football Club
- Nicknames: The Rs; The Hoops; Super Hoops
- Short name: QPR; Rangers
- Founded: 1882; 144 years ago, as Christchurch Rangers
- Ground: Loftus Road Stadium
- Capacity: 18,439
- Owner: Ruben Gnanalingam; Richard Reilly; Lakshmi Mittal
- Chairman: Lee Hoos
- Head coach: Julien Stéphan
- League: EFL Championship
- 2025–26: EFL Championship, 15th of 24
- Website: qpr.co.uk
Home colours	Away colours	Third colours

Queens Park Rangers Football Club, which can be abbreviated as QPR, is a professional association football club based in Shepherd's Bush / White City, West London, England. The team currently competes in the EFL Championship, the second tier of the English football league system.

The club was founded as Christchurch Rangers in 1882 and took up their current name after merging with St Judes Institute four years later, near the Queen's Park and Kensal areas. Having won the West London League in 1898–99, QPR joined the Southern and Western leagues where they won titles in both. It was during this period that the club reached the final of the FA Charity Shield twice in 1908 and 1912. QPR were elected to the Football League in 1920. The club played in the Third Division South until winning promotion as champions in 1947–48. The club was relegated in 1952, but slowly rebuilt under the stewardship of Alec Stock whose culminated in winning the Third Division title and also their only major trophy to date, the League Cup in the 1966–67 season. Promoted from the Second Division in 1967–68, they were relegated after one season in the First Division. QPR won promotion again in 1972–73 and then narrowly missed out winning the English league title in 1975–76, finishing only one point behind champions Liverpool. Relegated in 1979, they reached the FA Cup final as a second-tier club in 1982, losing to Tottenham Hotspur after a replay.

QPR won another Second Division title in 1982–83 and were beaten finalists in the 1986 League Cup final. They remained in the top-flight for thirteen years, becoming founder members of the Premier League in 1992, before being relegated in 1996. Relegated again in 2001, they secured promotion from the third tier at the end of the 2003–04 campaign. QPR won promotion as winners of the Championship in 2010–11, although they were relegated from the Premier League after two seasons. They won an immediate promotion via the play-offs in 2014 but were relegated again the following season and have remained in the Championship since that time.

After a relatively quiet early existence, QPR have played home matches at Loftus Road since 1917, apart from two brief spells at the White City Stadium. They share rivalries with various other clubs; most notably they have a large rivalry called the West London derby against local rivals Chelsea. Other notable rivals include fellow West London clubs; Fulham F.C and Brentford F.C, meanwhile other London derbies such as West Ham United F.C., Charlton Athletic F.C, and Millwall F.C have also sparked some rivalry, however not as much as others.

== History ==
=== Early history (1882–1920s) ===
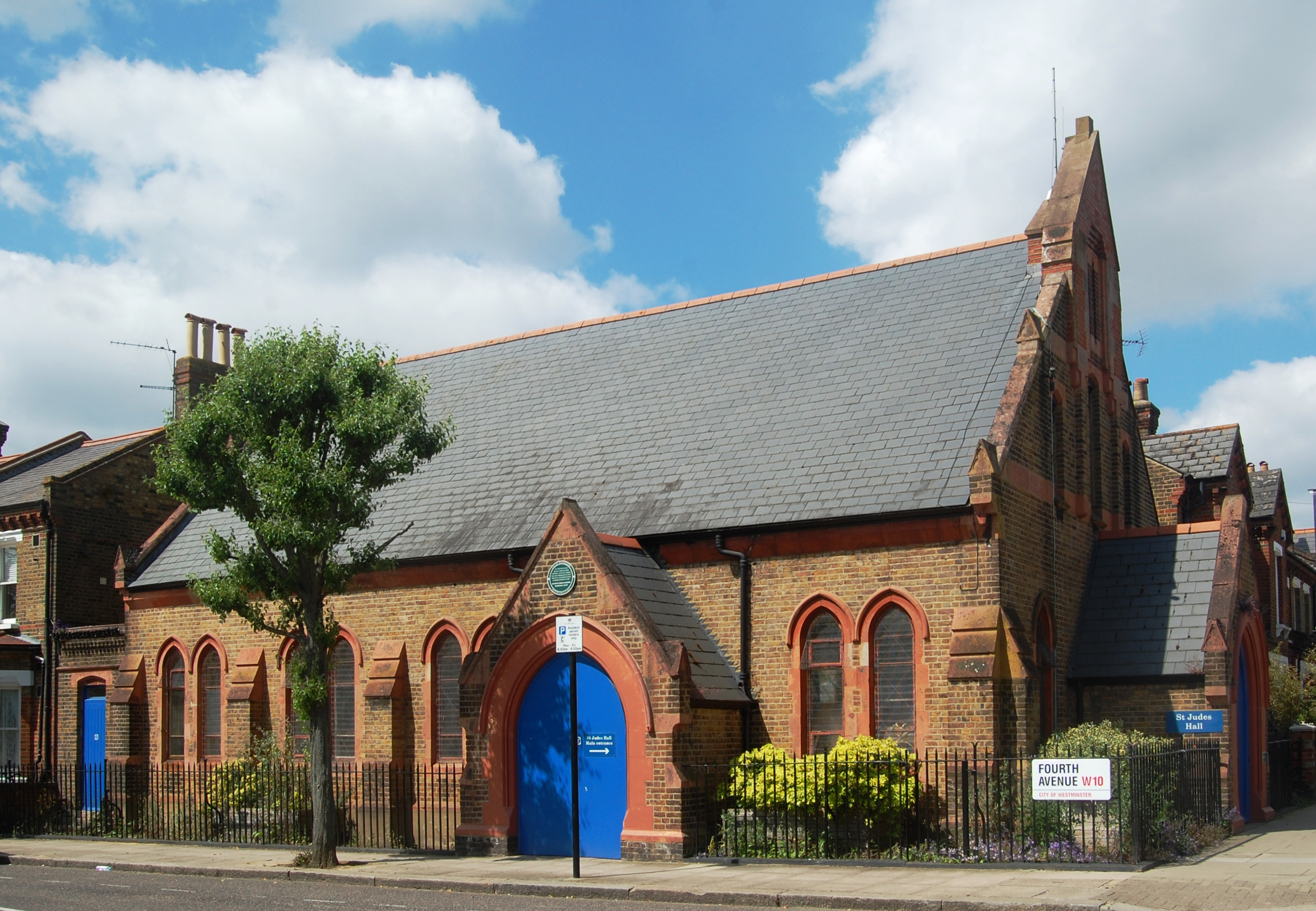
St Jude's Institute, where the club was formed.

The club was formed in 1886, when a team known as St Jude's (formed in 1884) merged with Christchurch Rangers (formed in 1882). The resulting team was called Queens Park Rangers and their official formation date is considered to be 1882, which is the original founding date of Christchurch Rangers. The club's name came from the fact that most of the players came from the Queen's Park area of North- West London. St Jude's Institute on Ilbert Street W10 is still in use as a community hall and in July 2011 club icon Stan Bowles unveiled a plaque celebrating its place in QPR history. 1882: QPR was founded as Queens Park Rangers by a group of schoolboys from the area of Queen's Park in North-West London. The club initially played in local leagues and was part of the amateur football movement.

QPR became a professional team in 1889. The club was elected into the Southern Football League in 1899. In 1899–1900 they put themselves on the map after qualifying for the first round proper of the FA Cup by beating Wolverhampton Wanderers on their own ground 1–0. The Guardian said "the hitherto unknown Queens Park Rangers, a team hailing from the north-west suburbs of London...upset all calculations."

At this time the club's core support, as indicated by its marketing area, was an area of West London, to the west of the A5 Road (Roman Watling Street), in and around the former boroughs of Paddington and Willesden. As London extended further west, the club's following grew along with it.

They first won the Southern Football League in 1907–08. As Southern League champions that year, they played in the first ever Charity Shield match, against the Football League champions Manchester United. The club lost 4–0 in a replay after the first game had finished 1–1. Both games were played at Stamford Bridge. QPR were Southern League champions for a second time in 1911–12.

=== Rise to prominence (1920s–1960s) ===
The club joined the Football League in 1920, when the Third Division was formed, mainly with Southern League clubs. When the Third Division was split into North and South the following season, QPR, like most of the former Southern League clubs that had joined the Football League to form the Third Division, were in the Third Division (South).

QPR played their home games in nearly 20 different stadia – a league record – before permanently settling at Loftus Road in 1917; although the team would briefly attempt to attract larger crowds by playing at the White City Stadium for two short spells: 1931 to 1933, and the 1962–63 season.

Chart showing the progress of QPR's league finishes from the 1920–21 season up to the present

The club were promoted as champions of Division 3 South in the 1947–48 season. Dave Mangnall was the manager as the club participated in four seasons of the Second Division, being relegated in 1951–52. Tony Ingham was signed from Leeds United and went on to make the most-ever league appearances for QPR (519). Arguably the club's greatest ever manager, Alec Stock, arrived prior to the start of the 1959–60 season. The 1960–61 season saw QPR achieve their biggest win to date: 9–2 vs Tranmere Rovers in a Division 3 match. In time, Stock, together with Jim Gregory who arrived as chairman in the mid-1960s, helped to achieve a total transformation of the club and its surroundings.

In 1966–67, QPR won the Division Three championship and became the first Third Division club to win the League Cup, on Saturday, 4 March 1967, beating West Bromwich Albion 3–2, after coming back from a two-goal deficit, securing the clubs first and only major trophy. It was also the first League Cup final to be held at Wembley Stadium. After winning promotion in 1968 to the top flight for the first time in their history, Rangers were relegated after just one season and spent the next four years in Division Two.

=== The golden era (1970s) ===
Terry Venables joined from Spurs at the beginning of the 1969–70 season and Rodney Marsh was sold to Manchester City. During this time, new QPR heroes emerged including Phil Parkes, Don Givens, Dave Thomas and Stan Bowles. These new signings were in addition to home-grown talent such as Dave Clement, Ian Gillard, Mick Leach and Gerry Francis.

In 1972 QPR were promoted to Division One (the top tier of English football), under manager Gordon Jago.

In 1974, Dave Sexton joined as manager and in 1975–76 led QPR to the runners-up spot in the First Division, missing out on the championship by only one point, with a squad containing seven England internationals and internationals from the home nations. After completing their 42-game season, QPR sat at the top of the league, one point ahead of Liverpool who went on to defeat Wolverhampton Wanderers to clinch the title. Wolves were relegated to the Second Division that same season. The late 1970s also saw some cup success with Rangers reaching the semi-finals of the League Cup and in their first entry into European football reached the quarter-finals of the UEFA Cup losing to AEK Athens on penalties. Following Sexton's departure in 1977 the club eventually slipped into the Second Division in 1979.

=== Promotions, relegations and two cup finals (1980s) ===
In 1980 Terry Venables took over as manager and in 1981 the club installed an artificial turf pitch. In 1982 QPR, still playing in the Second Division, reached the FA Cup final for the only time in the club's history, facing holders Tottenham Hotspur. Tottenham won 1–0 in a replay. The following season QPR went on to win the Second Division championship and returned to English football's top division. After a respectable fifth-place finish, and UEFA Cup qualification, the following year, Venables departed to become manager of Barcelona. In 1988 the club had a new chairman, 24-year-old Richard Thompson. Over the next seven years, various managers came and went at Loftus Road and the club spent many seasons finishing mid-table and avoiding relegation. The most successful season during this period was the 1987–88 season in which QPR finished fifth, although missing out on a UEFA Cup campaign due to the ban on English clubs in European competition as a result of the Heysel Stadium disaster. They were also runners-up in the 1986 League Cup, losing to Oxford United.

QPR crest used from 1982 until 2008

=== The Premier League years and relegation (1990s) ===
Gerry Francis, a key player in the 1970s QPR side who had proved himself as a successful manager with Bristol Rovers, was appointed manager in the summer of 1991. In his first season in charge they finished mid-table in the league and in the 1992–93 season were founder members of the inaugural Premier League, finishing fifth, as top London club. Francis oversaw one of QPR's most famous victories, the 4–1 win at Old Trafford in front of live TV on New Year's Day 1992. Midway through the 1994–95 season Francis resigned and very quickly became manager of Tottenham Hotspur and Ray Wilkins was installed as player-manager. Wilkins led QPR to an eighth-place finish in the Premiership. In July 1995 the club's top goalscorer, Les Ferdinand, was sold for a club record fee of £6 million to Newcastle United.

QPR struggled throughout the following season and were relegated at the end of the 1995–96 season. QPR then competed in Division 1 until 2001 under a succession of managers including club legend Gerry Francis who was reappointed for a second spell finishing mainly mid-table and towards the bottom half of the division.

=== Relegation, promotion, financial struggles and the arrival of Bernie and Flavio (2000s) ===
After several years of struggle in the second tier, QPR became embroiled in financial and boardroom controversy. Although the club had floated on the Alternative Investment Market in 1991, in 2001 it entered administration (receivership). A period of financial hardship followed and the club left administration after receiving a £10m high-interest emergency loan which continued to burden the club. The 00–01 season proved to be a disaster and Gerry Francis resigned in early 2001. Former Rangers midfielder Ian Holloway was appointed manager but failed to prevent the club from being relegated to the third division at the end of the season, the first time since the 1960s. After relegation Holloway assembled a team featuring several QPR fans in the squad including Kevin Gallen, Marc Bircham and Richard Langley alongside other key players such as Danny Shittu, Gareth Ainsworth and Clarke Carlisle. In their second season in the third tier, the club reached the play-off final in Cardiff, losing 0–1 to Cardiff City in extra time. The following season QPR put their playoff heartache behind them and returned to Division 1 after as runners-up, with a famous 3–1 win away at Hillsborough in front of 7000 traveling QPR fans.

Rangers struggled for consistent form over the next two campaigns before Holloway was suspended amidst rumors of his impending departure for Leicester City. A poor series of results and lack of progress at the club saw Holloway's successors Gary Waddock and later John Gregory – both former players – fail to hold on to the manager job.

Scandals involving the directors, shareholders and others emerged in 2005–06 season and included allegations of blackmail and threats of violence against the club's chairman Gianni Paladini. In an unrelated incident, QPR were further rocked by the murder of youth team player Kiyan Prince on 18 May 2006 and, in August 2007, the death of teenager and promising first-team player Ray Jones in a car crash.

Rangers continued to face mounting financial pressure, in the September 2007, it was announced that the club had been bought by wealthy Formula One businessmen Flavio Briatore and Bernie Ecclestone (see Ownership and finances below). John Gregory's reign as manager came to an end in October 2007 after a string of poor results left QPR at the bottom of the Championship and he was replaced by Luigi De Canio until the end of the 2007–08 season. Further investment followed in early 2008 as the club looked to push for promotion to the Premier League within four years, on the back of greater financial stability. On 14 May 2008, Iain Dowie was announced as the manager to begin the campaign to return Rangers to the top flight. However, on 24 October 2008, Dowie was sacked after just 15 games in charge of the club.

Crest introduced under Flavio Briatore and used from 2008 until 2016

On 19 November 2008, QPR named former Portugal midfielder Paulo Sousa as their new first team coach. However, on 9 April 2009, his contract was terminated after he allegedly divulged confidential information without authority. On the same day as Sousa's sacking, player/coach Gareth Ainsworth was appointed as player/caretaker manager for a second time. In June 2009 Jim Magilton was named as new manager of QPR. Despite leading QPR to a good start to the 2009–10 season, a loss of form combined with an alleged head-butting incident with Hungarian midfielder Ákos Buzsáky saw the club further embroiled in controversy. Magilton left the club by mutual consent on 16 December 2009, along with his assistant John Gorman. They were replaced by Paul Hart and Mick Harford on the next day.

=== Yo-yo club (2010s) ===
Less than a month and only five games after becoming manager at QPR, Paul Hart parted with the club on 14 January 2010; the reasons for his leaving the club were unstated.

On 1 March 2010, experienced EFL Championship manager Neil Warnock joined Queens Park Rangers as manager on a three-and-a-half-year deal after agreeing compensation with Crystal Palace. After comfortably helping the club avoid relegation in the 10–11 season, Warnock assembled a squad consisting mainly of Championship veterans such as Shaun Derry, Clint Hill, Paddy Kenny with previous on loan playmaker Adel Taarabt being given a central role in the team and given the captains armband.

On 30 April 2011, QPR secured promotion to the Premier League by winning the Championship with a 2–0 win over Watford. A subsequent FA investigation involving QPR's acquisition of Alejandro Faurlín threatened to deduct points from the side and put their promotion into jeopardy. The investigation concluded on 7 May 2011, with QPR found to be at fault in two of the seven charges, and received an £875,000 fine. However, there were no points deducted by the FA, and QPR's promotion to the Premier League was secured.

After the club was promoted Eccleston and Briatore sold their shares to Malaysian billionaire and Air Asia owner Tony Fernandes whose arrival sparked a deadline day spending spree to strengthen the QPR squad.

In January 2012, Fernandes sacked Warnock and appointed Mark Hughes as team manager. Following a tough start to his Loftus Road career and after a run of five straight home wins, Hughes and QPR escaped relegation despite a dramatic 3–2 defeat at Manchester City on the last day of the season.

On 23 November 2012, Mark Hughes was sacked after a poor start to the 2012–13 season, having amassed only four points in 12 games and with the club languishing at the bottom of the Premier League despite significant financial investment in new players in the 11 months of Hughes' tenure. A day later, Harry Redknapp was confirmed as the new manager. On 28 April 2013, in a 0–0 draw against fellow relegation rivals Reading, and with three games of the season to play, QPR were relegated from the Premier League down to the Championship after two seasons in the top flight.

During the 13–14 season, QPR finished fourth in the Championship, and qualified for the play-offs where they defeated Wigan Athletic in the semi-finals. In the final against favourites Derby County on 24 May 2014, QPR won 1–0 with a goal scored by Bobby Zamora in the 90th minute to return to the Premier League at the first time of asking.

Following promotion back to the Premier League, QPR endured a difficult 2014–15 season. Harry Redknapp resigned in February after poor results and mutual frustration with the board. He was replaced by Chris Ramsey. The club finished the season in last place, amassing only 30 points, and were relegated back to the Championship after only one season. After a poor start to the following season, Ramsey was sacked in November 2015 and former manager Neil Warnock returned in interim charge. On 4 December 2015, Jimmy Floyd Hasselbaink was appointed the club's new manager on a rolling contract. Hasselbaink was sacked on 5 November 2016, just 11 months after being in charge. Then six days later QPR reappointed Ian Holloway who was in charge ten years previously. Holloway's second spell saw him focus on bringing through young players to replace some of the aging players in the squad on big wages. Holloway gave debuts to youth team players Eberechi Eze and Ilias Chair and made other youngers like Darnell Furlong, Ryan Manning and Bright Osayi-Samuel key members of the team. Results on the pitch were inconsistent under Holloway and the club finished lower midtable in both seasons of his second spell. Holloway left the club at the end of the 2017–18 season.

On 17 May 2018, QPR appointed former England manager Steve McClaren as manager. Despite a promising first half of the season in which the team sat as high as eighth by Christmas, results quickly tailed off following the turn of the year and McClaren was sacked in April 2019 after a 2–1 loss to Bolton.

=== Rebuilding phase and the arrival of Nourry (2020s) ===
The club continued to build on its development of young talent, with a focus on producing more homegrown players and challenged for promotion in each of Mark Warburton's three seasons in charge. However, they failed to make the play-offs in any of these seasons. Warburton's contract was not renewed after the 2021–22 season in which a disappointing end to the season saw Rangers drop out of the play-offs where they had spent the majority of the season and finishing 11th..

Ahead of the 2022–23 season, former Aston Villa assistant manager and Rangers first-team coach Michael Beale was appointed as manager on a three-year deal on 1 June 2022. A fortnight after pledging his loyalty to the club Beale was approached by Scottish club Rangers who appointed him manager in November 2022. On 11 December 2022, former Blackpool manager and Aston Villa assistant Neil Critchley was named QPR manager after signing a 3 1/2-year deal. However, after a dismal run of form and dropping to 20th in the EFL Championship, Neil Critchley was sacked after just 46 days in charge, leaving with the lowest win percentage of any manager in their history, winning one match from twelve. He was replaced by former player Gareth Ainsworth, signing from Wycombe Wanderers.

In January 2024, Christian Nourry was appointed as the club's chief executive officer, replacing Lee Hoos, who remained as chairman. Nourry had previously worked for football consultancy and data analytics company Retexo, having advised the club on recruitment and its wider footballing structure. His appointment formed part of a wider restructuring of the club following a difficult start to the 2023–24 campaign.

After a poor start to the 2023–24 season, Gareth Ainsworth was sacked in October 2023 with the club in 23rd place in the Championship, following a run of six consecutive league defeats. He was replaced by Martí Cifuentes, who joined from Swedish side Hammarby. Despite spending much of the campaign in the relegation zone, Cifuentes gradually improved the team's performances, guiding QPR to Championship survival and an 18th-place finish.

QPR began the 2024–25 season poorly, recording just two league victories in their opening 16 matches and spending a period at the bottom of the Championship table. A 2–0 away victory against Cardiff City in December marked the beginning of an improvement in form, with the club subsequently recording ten victories in an 18-match spell. This run saw QPR climb towards the top half of the table and briefly move within reach of the play-off positions. However, injuries to several first-team players and an inconsistent end to the campaign prevented the club from mounting a serious promotion challenge. QPR ultimately finished 15th, collecting 56 points.

In April 2025, Cifuentes was placed on gardening leave following a 5–0 home defeat against Burnley, with assistant coaches Kevin Betsy and Xavi Calm taking charge of the final league fixture, a 1–0 away victory against Sunderland. Cifuentes officially departed the club by mutual consent on 24 June 2025, bringing an end to his two-year spell at Loftus Road. He was subsequently appointed head coach of Leicester City.

The following day, QPR appointed Frenchman Julien Stéphan as their new head coach. The 2025–26 season began with a difficult run of results but Stéphan's side subsequently improved and spent periods challenging for a place in the play-off positions during the first half of the campaign. However, an inconsistent second half of the season, including two separate runs of four consecutive league defeats, saw QPR fall away from the promotion race. The club finished 15th in the Championship with 58 points.

== Kits ==
A Queens Park Rangers FC home shirt for the 2012–13 season

Period	Kit manufacturer	Shirt sponsor
1974–1975	Admiral	None
1975–1976	Umbro	None
1976–1983	Adidas	None
1983–1986	Adidas	Guinness
1986–1987	Adidas	Blue*Star
1987–1989	Adidas	Holland and Fly KLM
1989–1990	Influence	Holland and Fly KLM
1990 Aug – 1990 Dec	Influence	Influence Leisure
1990 Dec – 1991	Influence	Holland and Fly KLM
1991–1992	Brooks	Brooks
1992–1993	Clubhouse	Classic FM
1993–1994	Clubhouse	CSF
1994–1995	Clubhouse	Compaq
1995–1996	View From	Compaq
1996–1997	View From	Ericsson
1997–2001	Le Coq Sportif	Ericsson
2001–2003	Le Coq Sportif	JD Sports
2003–2006	Le Coq Sportif	Binatone
2006–2008	Le Coq Sportif	Cargiant.co.uk
2008–2011	Lotto	GulfAir.com
2011–2012	Lotto	Malaysia Airlines (home) and AirAsia (away and third)
2012–2014	Lotto	AirAsia
2014–2016	Nike	AirAsia
2016–2017	Dryworld	Smarkets
2017–2020	Erreà	Royal Panda
2020	Erreà	BetUK.com
2020–2021	Erreà	Football Index
2021	Erreà	Senate Bespoke
2021	Erreà	Ashville Holdings
2022–2024	Erreà	Convivia
2024–2026	Erreà	CopyBet
2026–	Erreà	Mr Q

== Grounds ==
Queens Park Rangers have led a somewhat nomadic existence in their history. The several grounds used prior to 1886 are unknown but were probably in the Queen's Park area of London (the first being The Queen's Park itself). Thereafter, the club played at 15 different locations in west London and north-west London, but since joining the Football League in 1920, they have only played at two grounds: Loftus Road (briefly known as Kiyan Prince Foundation Stadium between 2019 and 2022) and White City Stadium.

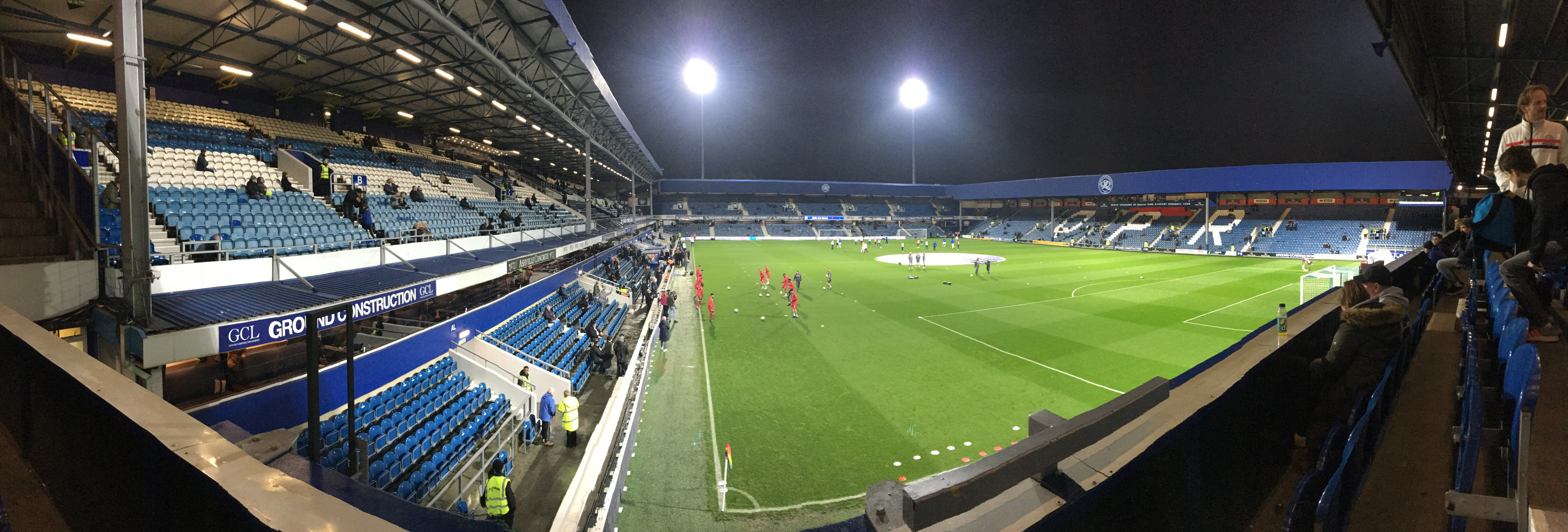
Loftus Road has been QPR's stadium for the majority of their history

Grounds of QPR since turning professional in 1898, covering three London boroughs.
- Welford Fields (1886–1888)
- London Scottish Ground (1888–1889)
- Home Farm (1888–1889)
- Kensal Green (1888–1889)
- Gun Club (1888–1889)
- Wormwood Scrubs (1888–1889)
- Kilburn Cricket Ground (1888–1889)
- Barn Elms (1891)
- Kensal Rise Athletic Ground (1899–1901)
- Latimer Road (1901–1902)
- Kensal Rise Athletic Ground (1902–1904)
- Royal Agricultural Society showgrounds (1904–1907) (Note: The grounds in Park Royal, London.)
- Park Royal Ground (1907–1917)
- Loftus Road (1917–1931)
- White City Stadium (1931–1933)
- Loftus Road (1933–1962)
- White City Stadium (1962–1963)
- Loftus Road (1963 –present)

There were plans to build a new 40,000-seater stadium called New Queens Park; however, plans have been shelved with the club looking to build a stadium on the site of the Linford Christie Stadium with 30,000 seats. The club have argued this would bring a huge financial boost to the local area, but their plans were met with some initial scepticism by Hammersmith & Fulham Council.

QPR have also been involved in a long-running legal battle to build a training ground at Warren Farm in Southall. In November 2018, Supreme Court judges rejected the final appeal from local objectors against the proposals, paving the way for the redevelopment of the site to begin. However the club formally abandoned plans for a training ground at Warren Farm on 6 May 2020 replacing it with a plan to develop the site into a community sports centre as the club signed a non-disclosure agreement with an unknown party regarding the freehold of another site. It was announced on 6 July that the club formally secured the freehold of the Heston Sports Ground from Imperial College, with the intention of developing the site into a training ground for the club, with discussions ongoing between the club and Hounslow Council.

On 31 March 2021, the club obtained planning permission for the redevelopment of Heston Sports Ground into a state of the art training ground, subject to a referral to the Secretary of State. The club received formal support from the Secretary of State on 27 September 2021 along with final planning permission from Hounslow Council being granted, with formal construction beginning on 1 October 2021. The Club aims to move into the £20m facility, (with £6.75m being raised through a bond scheme), by the start of the 2022–23 season, with the final competition date being the 2023–24 season.

In June 2019, the club gifted the stadium naming rights to The Kiyan Prince Foundation, a local charity set up by the father of Kiyan Prince. Prince was a former QPR youth player who was fatally stabbed in 2006. On 25 May 2022, the club announced that the stadium name would revert to Loftus Road ahead of the 2022–23 season.

== Fan base and club culture ==
QPR have a modest fanbase who come from across west London and the home counties. The club have supporters clubs across the world, including the Republic of Ireland, the US, Australia, Norway, and Sierra Leone. The club's longest running fanzine is A Kick Up The R's, which has been published every month since August 1987 and is sold at both home and away matches.

QPR have long-standing rivalries with several other clubs due to the club's location in West London. The most notable of these is the West London derby against Chelsea. Other rivalries include Brentford, Cardiff City, Millwall, Fulham and Luton.

The most vocal QPR fans at home games can be found in the Q, P, and R Blocks where fans often choose to stand and create the chants which the rest of the support in the Loft (newly known as the 'Go-Out Stand') and the Stanley Bowles Stand follow.

Rangers fans standing in the Loft End before a game against Luton Town in 2022

=== Songs and chants ===
When the club won the League Cup final in 1967, the club released the single "QPR – The Greatest" about the famous win, which featured the vocals of Rangers winger Mark Lazarus.

As the team come onto the pitch at Loftus Road and when they score, the song Papa's Got a Brand New Pigbag by post-punk band Pigbag is played, with the fans shouting "HOOPS" after the fifth trumpet toot. At away games it is commonly sung to imitate the song played at home games.

At matches, Rangers fans sing chants such as "Come On You Rs", "We are the pride of West London, The Blue & The White", "Captain Jack" and "We Are the Rangers Boys".

The Clash song 'London Calling' is often used at Middlesbrough F.C. and Fulham F.C, however it is widely regarded as QPR's due to the fact they supported, especially the lead guitarist Mick Jones QPR.

=== Mascot ===
Jude The Cat is QPR's current mascot, inspired by a black cat who began living at the stadium in the 1990s and was viewed as a source of good luck to the team by then-manager Gerry Francis. Both the cat and mascot were named 'Jude' in reference to the club's roots as St. Jude's Institute.

=== Famous fans ===
QPR have a number of celebrity supporters, including comedian Bill Bailey, musicians Pete Doherty (who used to write a QPR fanzine entitled All Quiet on the Western Avenue), Ian Gillan of Deep Purple, Robert Smith of The Cure, Mick Jones of The Clash, Glen Matlock of The Sex Pistols, Andrew Ridgeley of Wham! and Nick Cave; politicians Michael Gove and Alan Johnson; actor Martin Clunes; documentary-maker Louis Theroux, former England cricketer Alex Tudor and actor Robin Askwith.

== Records and statistics ==
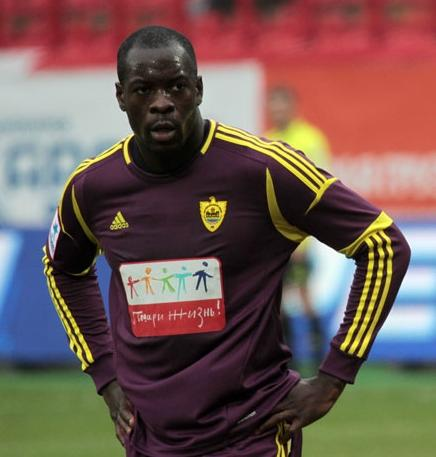
QPR signed Christopher Samba for a club record £12.5 million from Anzhi Makhachkala in January 2013, then sold him back for a then club record £12 million in July

- Highest attendance:41,097 at White City Stadium v Leeds United in a FA Cup tie in 1932.

(Loftus Road): 35,353 vs Leeds United, 27 April 1974, Division 1

- Highest all-seated attendance: 19,002 vs Manchester City, 6 November 1999, Division 1
- Biggest league win: 9–2 vs Tranmere Rovers, 3 December 1960, Division 3
- Biggest league loss: 1–8 vs Manchester United 19 March 1969, Division 1
- Biggest home defeat: 0–6 vs Newcastle United, 13 September 2016
- Most capped player: Alan McDonald, 52, Northern Ireland
- Most league appearances: Tony Ingham, 519, 1950–63
- Oldest player: Ray Wilkins, 39 years and 352 days, 1 September 1996, Division 1
- Youngest player: Frank Sibley, 15 years and 275 days
- Most league goals in a season: George Goddard, 37, Division 3 South, 1929–30.
- Most goals in a season: Rodney Marsh, 44 (30 League, 3 FA Cup, 11 League Cup) 1966–67
- Most league goals in total aggregate: George Goddard, 174, 1926–34.
- Most goals in total aggregate: George Goddard, 186, 1926–34
- Record transfer fee received: £19.5 million from Crystal Palace for Ebere Eze, August 2020
- Record transfer fee paid: £12.5 million to Anzhi Makhachkala for Christopher Samba, January 2013

=== QPR in Europe ===
QPR's first foray into European competition came when they qualified for the 1976–77 UEFA Cup, reaching the quarter-finals, where they were eliminated by AEK Athens on penalties. The club also qualified for the 1984–85 UEFA Cup but were knocked out in the second round by Partizan Belgrade.

== Players ==
=== First-team squad ===
As of 27 September 2026

Note: Flags indicate national team as defined under FIFA eligibility rules; some limited exceptions apply. Players may hold more than one non-FIFA nationality.

No.	Pos.	Nation	Player
1	GK	NIR	Pierce Charles (on loan from Manchester City)
2	DF	AUS	Kealey Adamson
3	DF	IRL	Jimmy Dunne (captain)
4	DF	SCO	Liam Morrison
5	DF	ENG	Ronnie Edwards
6	DF	ENG	Jake Clarke-Salter
7	MF	ENG	Karamoko Dembélé
10	MF	MAR	Ilias Chair
11	MF	NIR	Paul Smyth
12	DF	NED	Boy Kemper
13	GK	ENG	Calum Ward
14	MF	JPN	Kōki Saitō
15	FW	ENG	Alfie Lloyd

No.	Pos.	Nation	Player
16	FW	JAM	Rumarn Burrell
17	MF	GHA	Kwame Poku
18	MF	FIN	Glen Kamara (on loan from Stade Rennais)
19	DF	LAT	Dennis Cirkin
20	MF	IRL	Harvey Vale
22	FW	CIV	Richard Kone
24	MF	DEN	Nicolas Madsen
25	FW	TTO	Justin Obikwu
26	FW	ALG	Rayan Kolli
27	DF	SEN	Amadou Mbengue
32	GK	ENG	Matteo Salamon
40	MF	MTQ	Jonathan Varane
48	DF	GHA	Tariq Lamptey

=== Out on loan ===
As of 10 November 2026

Note: Flags indicate national team as defined under FIFA eligibility rules; some limited exceptions apply. Players may hold more than one non-FIFA nationality.

No.	Pos.	Nation	Player
21	MF	ENG	Kieran Morgan (at Bradford City until 31 May 2027)
30	DF	RSA	Tylon Smith (at New England Revolution until 31 May 2027)
35	MF	ENG	Philip Sanyaolu (at Bristol Rovers until 31 May 2027)
38	DF	FRA	Ziyad Larkeche (at Barnsley until 31 May 2027)
—	GK	ENG	Alfie Fittall (at Binfield until 8 December 2026)
—	GK	ENG	Joe Walsh (at Wigan Athletic until 31 May 2027)
—	DF	GHA	Cory Adjetey-Brew (at Worthing until 3 January 2027)

No.	Pos.	Nation	Player
—	DF	ENG	Nkhai Majesty (at Ascot United until 31 May 2027)
—	DF	ENG	Jaiden Putman (at Woking until 31 May 2027)
—	MF	AUS	Jaylan Pearman (at Swindon Town until 31 May 2027)
—	MF	AUS	Daniel Bennie (at Dundee United until 31 May 2027)
—	MF	IRL	Harvey Boddy (at Worthing until 31 May 2027)
—	MF	ENG	Emmerson Sutton (at Worthing until 25 November 2026)

=== Development squads ===
==== Development squad ====
As of 13 October 2026

Note: Flags indicate national team as defined under FIFA eligibility rules; some limited exceptions apply. Players may hold more than one non-FIFA nationality.

No.	Pos.	Nation	Player
23	MF	SWE	Isak Alemayehu
—	GK	ENG	Charlie Warren
—	DF	ENG	Kobe Agbude
—	DF	CZE	Timothy Akindileni
—	DF	BRA	João Henrique Esquerdinha
—	DF	SCO	Rocco Friel
—	DF	IRL	Oisin McDonagh
—	DF	AUS	Christian Pullella

No.	Pos.	Nation	Player
—	MF	ENG	Kaleb Dyke
—	MF	ENG	Rico Kennedy
—	MF	ENG	Fraser Neill
—	MF	ENG	Archie O'Brien
—	MF	ENG	Amar Sanghrajka
—	MF	ENG	Teddy Tarbotton
—	FW	ENG	Ridwan Hassan

==== Under-18s squad ====
As of 10 November 2026

Note: Flags indicate national team as defined under FIFA eligibility rules; some limited exceptions apply. Players may hold more than one non-FIFA nationality.

No.	Pos.	Nation	Player
33	MF	WAL	Leon Scarlett
—	GK	ENG	Cian Osborne
—	GK	ENG	Kasey Taylor
—	DF	USA	Eddie Chadwick
—	DF	ENG	Ruben Michaud
—	DF	ENG	Izik Mitchell-Abadom
—	DF	ENG	Shaquille Sandiford
—	DF	WAL	Charlie Street
—	DF	ENG	Jerrell Tang
—	MF	BER	Kalen Brunson
—	MF	WAL	Declan De-Vulgt
—	MF	ENG	Giovanni Ikoroha

No.	Pos.	Nation	Player
—	MF	SCO	James McAvoy
—	MF	ENG	Samuel McKenna
—	MF	ENG	Kyreece Moore
—	MF	COL	Ashley Trujillo
—	MF	ROU	Kevin Wadman
—	MF	WAL	William Whitehead
—	MF	ENG	Thomas Wiles
—	FW	ENG	Noah Anderson
—	FW	ENG	Kemuel Edouard-Marisson
—	FW	ENG	Gabriel Oluwabusola
—	FW	IRL	Joshua Wright

=== Notable former players ===
==== Retired numbers ====
Note: Flags indicate national team as defined under FIFA eligibility rules; some limited exceptions apply. Players may hold more than one non-FIFA nationality.

No.	Pos.	Nation	Player
31	FW	ENG	Ray Jones (2006–2007) posthumous honour

==== QPR Supporters' Player of the Year ====
Year	Winner	Position
1992–93	(England) Andy Impey	Midfielder
1993–94	(England) Andy Impey	Midfielder
1994–95	(England) Andy Impey	Midfielder
1995–96	Not Awarded	
1996–97	Not Awarded	
1997–98	(Wales) Karl Ready	Defender
1998–99	(Jamaica) Danny Maddix	Defender
1999–00	(England) Stuart Wardley	Defender
2000–01	(England) Peter Crouch	Striker
2001–02	(England) Terrell Forbes	Defender

Year	Winner	Position
2002–03	(England) Kevin Gallen	Striker
2003–04	(Republic of Ireland) Martin Rowlands	Midfielder
2004–05	(England) Paul Furlong	Striker
2005–06	(Nigeria) Danny Shittu	Defender
2006–07	(England) Lee Cook	Midfielder
2007–08	(Republic of Ireland) Martin Rowlands	Midfielder
2008–09	(Jamaica) Damion Stewart	Defender
2009–10	(Argentina) Alejandro Faurlín	Midfielder
2010–11	(Republic of Ireland) Paddy Kenny	Goalkeeper
2011–12	(England) Clint Hill	Defender

Year	Winner	Position
2012–13	(England) Clint Hill	Defender
2013–14	(England) Charlie Austin	Striker
2014–15	(England) Charlie Austin	Striker
2015–16	(England) Grant Hall	Defender
2016–17	(England) Alex Smithies	Goalkeeper
2017–18	(Australia) Massimo Luongo	Midfielder
2018–19	(England) Luke Freeman	Midfielder
2019–20	(England) Eberechi Eze	Midfielder
2020–21	(England) Rob Dickie	Defender
2021–22	(England) Chris Willock	Midfielder

Year	Winner	Position
2022–23	(England) Sam Field	Midfielder
2023–24	(England) Steve Cook	Defender
2024–25	(Republic of Ireland) Jimmy Dunne	Defender
2025–26	(Denmark) Nicolas Madsen	Midfielder

Source: Myfootballfacts.com

==== Queens Park Rangers FC 'All Time XI' ====

Queens Park Rangers F.C. all-time first XI

Queens Park Rangers fans were asked for a vote for their all time strongest squad in 2008.

- (England) Phil Parkes (1970–79)
- (England) Dave Clement (1965–79)
- (Northern Ireland) Alan McDonald (1981–97)
- (England) Paul Parker (1987–91)
- (England) Ian Gillard (1968–82)
- (England) Trevor Sinclair (1993–98)
- (England) Stan Bowles (1972–79)
- (England) Gerry Francis (1968–79 and 1981–82)
- (England) Dave Thomas (1972–77)
- (England) Les Ferdinand (1987–95)
- (England) Rodney Marsh (1966–72)

Updated 14 May 2019.

== Club management ==
=== Current staff ===
Updated 10 August 2023.

==== Football staff ====
Position	Name	Nationality
Head coach	Julien Stéphan	France
Assistant head coach	Kevin Betsy	Seychelles
First team coach	Steve Bould	England
Goalkeeping coach	Andrew Sparkes	Wales
Director of performance	Ben Williams	England
Kit manager	Gary Doyle	England

==== Board of directors and senior management ====
Position	Name	Nationality
Owners	Ruben Gnanalingam	Malaysia
Owners	Lakshmi Mittal and family	India
Owners	Richard Reilly	United States
Chairman	Lee Hoos	United States
Board members	Ruben Gnanalingam	Malaysia
Board members	Richard Reilly	United States
Board members	Lee Hoos	United States
Chief executive	Christian Nourry	England
Finance director	Ruban Ghandi	Malaysia
Commercial director	Euan Inglis	Scotland
Head of media and communications	Paul Morrissey	England
Head of operations	Joshua Scott	England
QPR in the Community Trust CEO	Andy Evans	England
Club ambassador	Andy Sinton	England
Football secretary	Terry Springett	England
Academy director	Alex Carroll	England

=== Managerial history ===
As of 3 May 2026

The last ten permanent managers of QPR:

Name	Nat	From	To	Time in Charge	G	W	D	L	Win %^{[A]}	Honours and/or notes	Ref(s)
Chris Ramsey	England	12 February 2015	4 November 2015	206 days	30	8	6	16	26.7	–	
Jimmy Floyd Hasselbaink	Netherlands	4 December 2015	5 November 2016	337 days	38	11	15	12	28.9	–	
Ian Holloway	England	11 November 2016	10 May 2018	1 year, 180 days	80	26	14	40	32.5	–	
Steve McClaren	England	18 May 2018	1 April 2019	318 days	46	16	9	21	34.8	–	
Mark Warburton	England	8 May 2019	1 June 2022	3 years, 24 days	150	56	35	59	37.3	–	
Michael Beale	England	1 June 2022	28 November 2022	180 days	22	9	5	8	40.9	–	
Neil Critchley	England	11 December 2022	19 February 2023	70 days	12	1	5	6	8.33	Lowest win percentage of any permanent QPR manager.	–
Gareth Ainsworth	England	21 February 2023	29 October 2023	250 days	28	5	4	19	17.85	–	–
Martí Cifuentes	Spain	30 October 2023	24 June 2025	3 years, 23 days	82	28	23	31	34.14	–	–
Julien Stéphan	France	25 June 2025	Present	1 year, 150 days	48	16	10	22	33.33	–	–

=== Ownership and finances ===
British music, media and sport entrepreneur Chris Wright bought QPR in 1996, eventually relinquishing his majority shareholding in 2001 having ploughed £20 million into Loftus Road over the previous five years; the club struggled financially and went into administration that same year. Following lengthy negotiations in December 2004, Wright agreed to sell his remaining 15% stake; 50% of the money paid to him was given back to QPR, which was significant amount of cash to the club.

After a number of years of financial difficulties which included a period in financial administration, QPR was bought by Formula One tycoons and multi-millionaires Bernie Ecclestone and Flavio Briatore in a £14 million takeover in August 2007. In spending £690,000 to acquire a 69% majority stake in the club from a Monaco-based consortium led by Italian football agent, Antonio Caliendo, Ecclestone spent £150,000 on his 15%, while Briatore bought 54% for £540,000 through a British Virgin Islands registered company, Sarita Capital. In addition, Briatore and Ecclestone were believed to have promised £5 million in convertible loan facilities to help buy players and have covered £13 million of debt, in a total commitment to the club of around £20 million. At the time of purchase, the remaining 31% of shareholders turned down the offer of 1p a share.

On 20 December 2007, it was announced that the family of billionaire Lakshmi Mittal had purchased a 20% shareholding in the club from Flavio Briatore. The purchase price of the 20% stake was just £200,000. As part of the investment Lakshmi Mittal's son-in-law Amit Bhatia took a place on the board of directors. While Gianni Paladini remained chairman of the football club, Alejandro Agag, as chairman of QPR Holdings (the parent company) was the de facto chairman, until he was replaced by Flavio Briatore in early February 2008. Agag moved into the role of managing director, supported by a deputy managing director, Ali Russell, who moved from Hearts in the Scottish Premier League.

Despite QPR's perilous financial condition in 2007–08, the combined personal wealth of the club's new owners – which included the then world's eighth richest man, Lakshmi Mittal – sparked speculation that QPR would receive significant further investment from their new benefactors, drawing parallels with their wealthy West London neighbours Chelsea and Fulham. However, no significant further funds were made available to the club other than those injected as part of the purchase of its share capital, and much of the subsequent player transfer activity involved loan acquisitions or free transfers. Indeed, it was reported in January 2008 that the investors had not discharged the £10 million loan from ABC Corporation – secured on the club's stadium – together with its £1 million annual interest burden—despite the club's prospective annual turnover of between £10 million and £15 million. Furthermore, around £2 million was still owed to former director and major shareholder, Antonio Caliendo, who waived £4.5 million of loans when Briatore and Ecclestone bought the club. It was expected that the ABC loan would be discharged in June 2008 on its maturity and that the debt owed to Caliendo would be paid off "in early 2008" in line with a funding strategy which Ecclestone publicly stated would not result in the wealthy owners simply bankrolling the club. In fact, the ABC loan was discharged on or around 31 July 2008.

Mittal's investment is thought to be primarily motivated by his son-in-law's interests and it was assumed that Mittal himself would remain a silent investor while Briatore, Ecclestone and Bhatia worked together to implement the strategy of slowly building the club up ahead of a push for promotion to the Premier League in 2009. The new owners also pledged to refurbish Loftus Road and use their experience in Formula One to increase sponsorship revenues. On 25 March 2008, QPR confirmed that, from the 2008–09 season and for five seasons, their kits would be supplied by Lotto Sport Italia as part of a number of new partnerships formed by Flavio Briatore. The investment potential of the club's new backers resulted in a number of wildly speculative storylines in the football press throughout the 2007–08 season, including rumoured signings of former World Player of the Year winners Luís Figo and Zinedine Zidane, the latter as a possible manager.

In May 2008, billionaire Vijay Mallya was linked with buying into the club, as part of the Ecclestone, Briatore and Mittal consortium. Following the termination of the club's sponsorship deals with Car Giant, Le Coq Sportif and Sellotape at the end of the 2007–08 season, in early July 2008 it was expected to be announced that Gulf Air would be the new shirt sponsors for three years. Further sponsorship packages were also announced, including Abbey Financial Services and Lotto Sport Italia. On 12 September 2011, Malaysia Airlines and AirAsia announced sponsorship of QPR's shirts for the two seasons, with the sponsorship costing some £6.2 million.

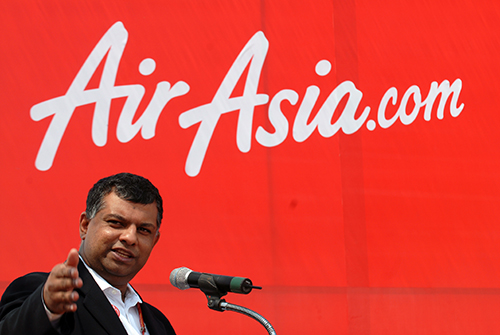
Tony Fernandes was the chairman of Queens Park Rangers

Flavio Briatore's future as QPR chairman came into question in September 2009 after he left the Renault F1 team in the midst of race fixing allegations. The Football League board discussed the matter on 8 October 2009 and declared that they would be awaiting a response from Briatore to various questions before commenting further. Meanwhile, the club continued to make losses (£18.8m in 2008–09 and £13.7m 2009–10). Briatore sold his 62% share to Ecclestone in December 2010, with the Italian possibly retaining a right of first refusal should Ecclestone sell, and initially stepped back from the day-to-day running of the business in favour of Amit Bhatia and Ishan Saksena, the company chairman and managing director respectively. However, his involvement gradually returned, and conflicts between Briatore on the one hand and Bhatia and Saksena on the other resulted in both Bhatia and Saksena leaving QPR in May 2011.

On 18 August 2011, Malaysian businessman Tony Fernandes was unveiled as the majority shareholder after having bought out Ecclestone's 66 per cent stake in the club for a rumoured fee of around £35 million, while the Mittal Family retained their 33% stake. Amit Bhatia was restored to his position as vice-chairman. Phillip Beard was announced as the new chief executive of the club and Gianni Paladini removed as club chairman. Briatore and Ecclestone were no longer involved with the club, with no board representation or other financial ties. Bhatia also explained in the takeover announcement that the loan, representing the refinanced ABC Corporation debt secured using the stadium as collateral, had now been "bought off" by the new regime – that is, refinanced by new debt. It is thought that the current debt is represented by a shareholder loan to the club and is non-interest-bearing. Despite the club's fortunes in attracting investors, it continues to be mired in controversy from previous ownership regimes and has been subject to proceedings from former investors Dunga and Antonio Caliendo.

On 15 August 2018, Bhatia took over as chairman of the club. On 10 July 2023, Fernandes announced that he is disposing all of his shares in the club to focus on rebuilding his airline business. On 20 July 2026, Bhatia teamed up with Jeff Bezos to buy a minority stake in Liverpool FC. Bhatia subsequently transferred his shares to Ruben Gnanalingam

== Honours ==
Note: the leagues and divisions of English football have changed somewhat over time, so here they are grouped into their relative levels on the English football league system at the time they were won to allow easy comparison of the achievement

League

- First Division (level 1)
  - Runners-up: 1975–76
- Second Division / Championship (level 2)
  - Champions: 1982–83, 2010–11
  - 2nd place promotion: 1967–68, 1972–73
  - Play-off winners: 2014
- Third Division South / Third Division / Second Division (level 3)
  - Champions: 1947–48, 1966–67
  - 2nd place promotion: 2003–04
- Southern League
  - Champions: 1907–08, 1911–12
- Western League
  - Champions: 1905–06

Cup

- FA Cup
  - Runners-up: 1981–82
- League Cup
  - Winners: 1966–67
  - Runners-up: 1985–86
- FA Charity Shield
  - Runners-up: 1908, 1912

Minor

- Bruges Matins: 1977
- Division Three South (North Region): 1945–46
- Wartime League South B: 1939–40
- West London Challenge Cup runners-up: 1890–91
- West London Observer Cup: 1891–92, 1892–93
- London Cup: 1895
- London Challenge Cup
  - Winners: 1932–33, 1938–39, 1955–56, 1965–66
- Southern Charity Cup: 1913
- Copa De Ibiza: 2005
- Trofeo Bortolotti: 2011
- Dryworld Cup: 2016
- Premier League Cup: 2024–25
- London Senior Cup: 2025–26

== See also ==
- Football in London
