= Isak Alemayehu =

Swedish footballer (born 2006)

Personal information
- Full name: Isak Alexander Alemayehu Mulugeta
- Date of birth: 11 October 2006 (age 20)
- Place of birth: Umeå, Sweden
- Height: 1.77 m (5 ft 10 in)
- Position: Midfielder

Team information
- Current team: Queens Park Rangers
- Number: 23

Youth career
- AIK
- Djurgårdens IF
- 2024: → Feyenoord (loan)

Senior career*
Years	Team	Apps	(Gls)
2022–2025	Djurgårdens IF	11	(0)
2024	→ FC Stockholm (loan)	4	(0)
2025–	Queens Park Rangers	1	(0)

International career^{‡}
2021–2022	Sweden U17	13	(5)
2023–2024	Sweden U19	6	(0)
2025–	Sweden U21	1	(0)
- * Club domestic league appearances and goals as of 15:34, 4 May 2026 (UTC) ‡ National team caps and goals as of 21:20, 25 July 2025 (UTC)

Isak Alexander Alemayehu Mulugeta (born 11 October 2006) is a Swedish professional footballer who plays as a central midfielder for EFL Championship club Queens Park Rangers. He has represented Sweden at multiple youth international levels.

== Early life ==
Alemayehu was born in Umeå, Sweden. He is of Ethiopian and Salvadoran descent; his father is from Ethiopia and his mother from El Salvador.

== Club career ==
Alemayehu began playing football at AIK before joining the youth academy of Djurgården.

He made his senior debut for Djurgården on 6 November 2022 in an Allsvenskan match against Mjällby AIF, at the age of 16 years and 26 days. In doing so he became the youngest Djurgården player in Allsvenskan history.

In early 2024, he was loaned to Dutch club Feyenoord where he joined their youth setup. Later in 2024, he was loaned to FC Stockholm Internazionale in Sweden's third tier, Division 1, making four appearances.

For the 2025 season, Alemayehu returned to Djurgårdens IF and featured in both domestic and European matches. Alemayehu scored his first career goal on 1 May 2025 in a 4–1 home loss in the first leg of Djurgården's 2024–25 UEFA Conference League Semi-final defeat to Chelsea. It was Djurgården's only goal in the tie.

On 1 September 2025, Alemayehu joined EFL Championship side Queens Park Rangers for an undisclosed fee.

== International career ==
Alemayehu has represented Sweden U10 as well as the U17 and U19 teams. He is also eligible to represent Ethiopia and El Salvador at the senior level.

== Playing style ==
Alemayehu plays primarily as an attacking midfielder but is also capable of playing on the wing or centrally. He is noted for his technical skill and versatility.

== Honours ==
=== Club ===
Queens Park Rangers Development Squad

- London Senior Cup champions: 2025–26
