= Teddy Tarbotton =

English association football player (born 2006)

Personal information
- Full name: Teddy Tarbotton
- Date of birth: 29 September 2007 (age 19)
- Place of birth: England
- Position: Midfielder

Team information
- Current team: Queens Park Rangers

Youth career
- Hull City
- 2020–2025: Queens Park Rangers

Senior career*
| Years | Team | Apps | (Gls) |
| 2025– | Queens Park Rangers | 0 | (0) |
| 2025 | → Bracknell Town (loan) | 7 | (0) |
| 2025–2026 | → Farnborough (loan) | 13 | (0) |
- * Club domestic league appearances and goals as of 19:42, 6 January 2026 (UTC)

Teddy Tarbotton (born 29 September 2007) is an English professional footballer who plays as a midfielder for EFL Championship club Queens Park Rangers.

== Club career ==
=== Queens Park Rangers ===
Tarbotton started his career with Hull City, before joining Queens Park Rangers in December 2020. On 12 August 2025, he made his first-team debut for Queens Park Rangers in a 3–2 away defeat to Plymouth Argyle in the EFL Cup, replacing Elijah Dixon-Bonner in the 90th minute.

Just over a week later, he joined Southern League Premier Division South side, Bracknell Town on initially on loan until January 2026. Tarbotton made 13 appearances and scored twice in all competitions before his loan was cut short in October, allowing him to join National League South side Farnborough on another loan deal lasting until January.

== Career statistics ==
As of match played 30 December 2025

Appearances and goals by club, season and competition
| Club | Season | League | | | FA Cup | | EFL Cup | | Other | | Total | |
| Club | Season | Division | Apps | Goals | Apps | Goals | Apps | Goals | Apps | Goals | Apps | Goals |
|---|---|---|---|---|---|---|---|---|---|---|---|---|
| Queens Park Rangers | 2025–26 | Championship | 0 | 0 | — | | 1 | 0 | — | | 1 | 0 |
| Bracknell Town (loan) | 2025–26 | Southern League Premier Division South | 7 | 0 | 5 | 1 | — | | 1 (Note: Appearance in the FA Trophy) | 1 | 13 | 2 |
| Farnborough (loan) | 2025–26 | National League South | 13 | 0 | — | | — | | — | | 13 | 0 |
| Career total | | | 20 | 0 | 5 | 1 | 1 | 0 | 1 | 1 | 27 | 2 |

== Honours ==
=== Club ===
Queens Park Rangers Development Squad

- London Senior Cup champions: 2025–26
