= Jaiden Putman =

English association football player (born 2006)

Personal information
- Full name: Jaiden Ellis Putman
- Date of birth: 18 September 2006 (age 20)
- Place of birth: England
- Position: Defender

Team information
- Current team: Woking (on loan from Queens Park Rangers)
- Number: 21

Youth career
- 2014–2024: Queens Park Rangers

Senior career*
Years	Team	Apps	(Gls)
2024–	Queens Park Rangers	0	(0)
2024	→ Barking (loan)	2	(0)
2025	→ Oxford City (loan)	3	(0)
2025–2026	→ Bath City (loan)	25	(0)
2026–	→ Woking (loan)	13	(0)
- * Club domestic league appearances and goals as of 20:18, 22 November 2026 (UTC)

Jaiden Ellis Putman (born 18 September 2006) is an English professional footballer who plays as a defender for National League club Woking on loan from Queens Park Rangers.

== Club career ==
=== Queens Park Rangers ===
Putman started his career with Queens Park Rangers, joining the club's under-9s at the age of eight. Before signing his first professional contract at the end of the 2024–25 season, he enjoyed loan spells at both Barking and Oxford City.

On 12 August 2025, he made his first-team debut for Queens Park Rangers in a 3–2 away defeat to Plymouth Argyle in the EFL Cup, playing 86 minutes before being substituted for fellow academy graduate debutant Kalen Brunson. On 6 December 2025, Putman joined National League South side, Bath City on loan until 3 January 2026. On 7 February 2026, his loan was extended until the end of the season.

On 7 August 2026, Putman joined National League side, Woking on a short-term youth loan. On 14 October 2026, his loan was extended until the end of the season.

== Career statistics ==
As of 22 November 2026

Appearances and goals by club, season and competition
Club	Season	League			FA Cup		EFL Cup		Other		Total	
Club	Season	Division	Apps	Goals	Apps	Goals	Apps	Goals	Apps	Goals	Apps	Goals
Queens Park Rangers	2024–25	Championship	0	0	0	0	0	0	—		0	0
Queens Park Rangers	2025–26	Championship	0	0	0	0	1	0	—		1	0
Queens Park Rangers	2026–27	Championship	0	0	0	0	0	0	—		0	0
Queens Park Rangers	Total		0	0	0	0	1	0	—		1	0
Barking (loan)	2024–25	Essex Senior League	2	0	—		—		0	0	2	0
Oxford City (loan)	2024–25	National League North	3	0	—		—		0	0	3	0
Bath City (loan)	2025–26	National League South	25	0	—		—		2 (Note: Appearances in FA Trophy)	0	27	0
Woking (loan)	2026–27	National League	13	0	0	0	—		4 (Note: Appearance(s) in National League Cup)	0	17	0
Career total			43	0	0	0	1	0	6	0	50	0
