= Amadou Mbengue =

Senegalese footballer (born 2002)

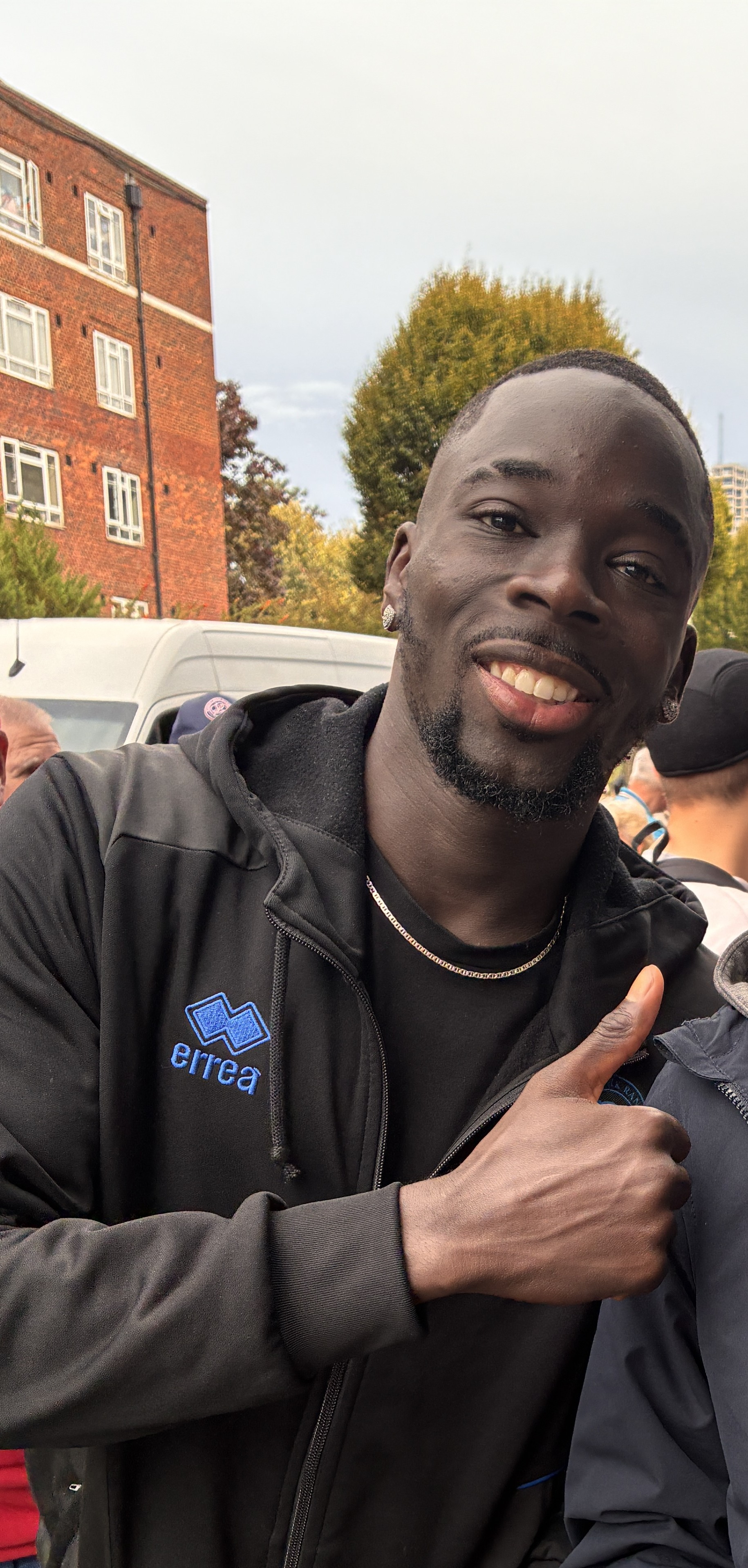
- Amadou Mbengue in 2025.

Personal information
- Full name: Amadou Salif Mbengue
- Date of birth: 5 January 2002 (age 24)
- Place of birth: France
- Height: 5 ft 11 in (1.80 m)
- Positions: Centre back; defensive midfielder

Team information
- Current team: Queens Park Rangers
- Number: 27

Youth career
- Melun
- Metz

Senior career*
Years	Team	Apps	(Gls)
2021–2022	Metz II	11	(0)
2021–2022	Metz	12	(0)
2022–2025	Reading	97	(2)
2025–	Queens Park Rangers	35	(2)

International career^{‡}
2023–	Senegal U23	2	(0)
- * Club domestic league appearances and goals as of 22 March 2026 ‡ National team caps and goals as of 12:15, 29 March 2023 (UTC)

Amadou Salif Mbengue (born 5 January 2002) is a professional footballer who plays as a centre-back or defensive midfielder, for EFL Championship club Queens Park Rangers. Born in France, he represents Senegal at youth level.

== Club career ==
Amadou Mbengue was part of FC Melun's youth setup, before joining the FC Metz academy.

He made his professional debut for Metz on 3 October 2021 during a 3–2 Ligue 1 away loss against Angers; where he came on as an early substitute for Sikou Niakaté, who was, injured after a tackle from Mohamed-Ali Cho.

=== Reading ===
On 13 September 2022, Reading confirmed the signing of Mbengue on a short-term contract until January 2023 after training with the club since leaving Metz during the summer of 2022. He scored his first goal for the club, and his first professional goal, on 10 December 2022 in a 1–0 win against Coventry City. On 13 January 2023, Reading announced that Mbengue had extended his contract with the club until the end of the season, with a view to a further extension. On 17 May 2023, with his contract due to expire at the end of June 2023, Reading confirmed that they had offered Mbengue a new two-year contract, which was signed on 19 July 2023.

On 16 May 2025, Reading announced that they had offered Mbengue a new contract, which was due to expire on 30 June 2025. On 26 June 2025, Reading announced that Mbengue had turned down a new contract in order to sign for Queens Park Rangers.

=== Queens Park Rangers ===
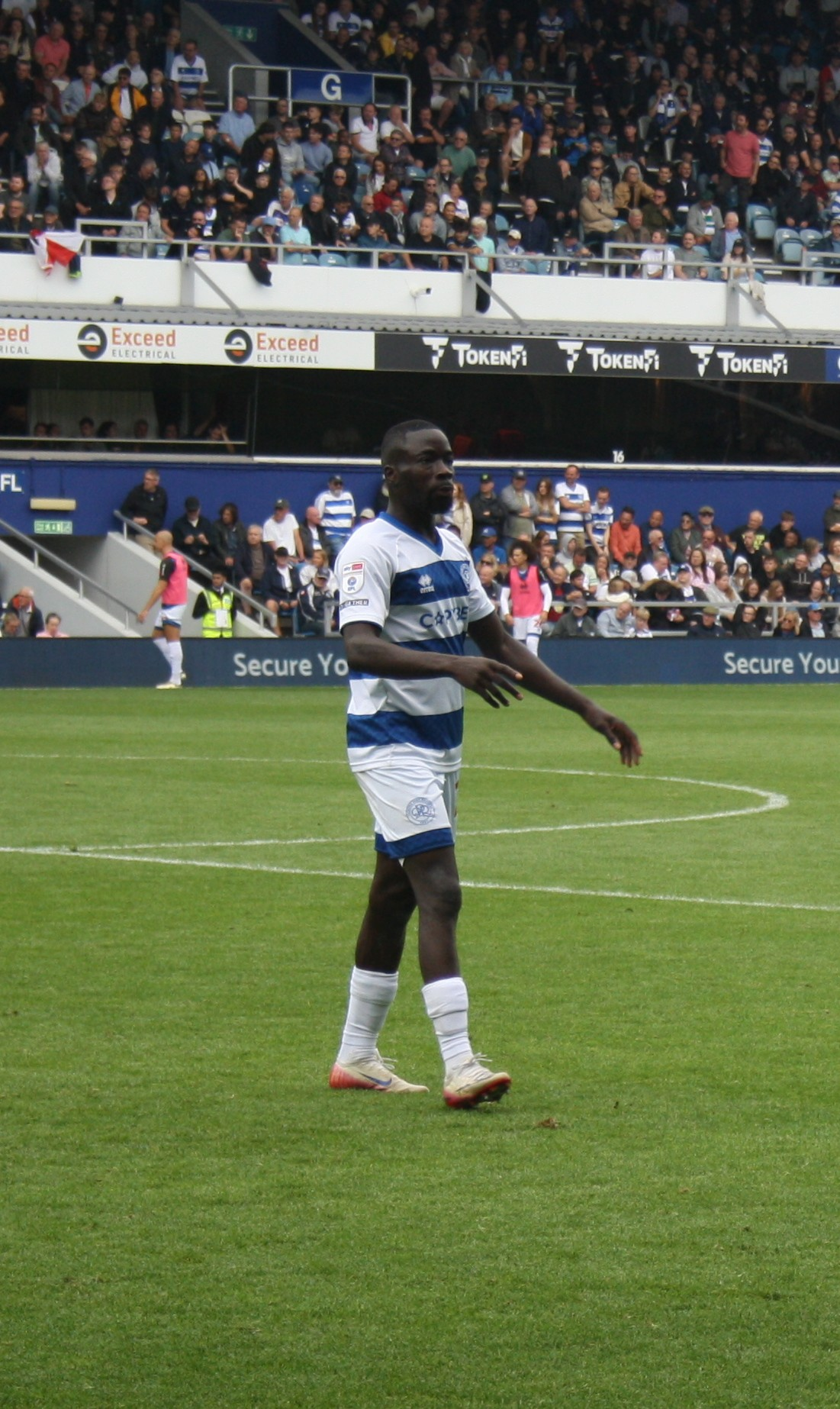
Amadou Mbengue playing for Queens Park Rangers against Stoke City on 20 September 2025.

On 26 June 2025, Queens Park Rangers announced that Mbengue would join the club on 1 July 2025, following the expiration of his Reading contract.

He made his debut on 9 August 2025 starting in a 1-1 draw with Preston North End at Loftus Road.

On 18th September 2025 He was named as the 1205th player to play for Queens Park Rangers with his debut on 09/08/2025.

== International career ==
In March 2023, Mbengue was called up to the Senegal U23 team for the first time.

== Career statistics ==
As of match played on 1 January 2026

Appearances and goals by club, season and competition
Club	Season	League			National Cup (Note: Includes Coupe de France, FA Cup)		League Cup (Note: Includes EFL Cup)		Other		Total	
Club	Season	Division	Apps	Goals	Apps	Goals	Apps	Goals	Apps	Goals	Apps	Goals
Metz II	2021–22	Championnat National 2	11	0	0	0	—		0	0	11	0
Metz	2021–22	Ligue 1	12	0	1	0	—		0	0	13	0
Reading	2022–23	Championship	26	1	2	1	0	0	—		28	2
Reading	2023–24	League One	37	0	1	0	2	0	4 (Note: Appearances in EFL Trophy)	0	44	0
Reading	2024–25	League One	34	1	1	0	1	0	1	0	37	1
Reading	Total		97	2	4	1	3	0	5	0	109	3
Queens Park Rangers	2025–26	Championship	23	2	0	0	0	0	—		23	2
Career total			143	4	5	1	3	0	5	0	156	5
