= 2021–22 Essex Senior Football League =

The 2021–22 season was the 51st in the history of the Essex Senior Football League, a football competition in England.

The proposed constitution for this season was published on 22 May 2021, based on allocations for Steps 5 and 6 announced by the FA five days earlier, and it was subject to appeal. The constitution was ratified at the league's annual general meeting (AGM) on 24 June.

After the abandonment of the 2019–20 and 2020–21 seasons due to the COVID-19 pandemic in England, numerous promotions were decided on a points per game basis over the previous two seasons.

The league featured 16 clubs which competed in the division last season, along with five new clubs.

- Promoted from the Eastern Counties League Division One South:
  - Athletic Newham
  - Little Oakley
  - White Ensign
- Transferred from the Eastern Counties League Premier Division:
  - FC Clacton
  - Stanway Rovers

Cockfosters were initially moved to the Spartan South Midlands League, but they won their appeal and the transfer was reversed.

Walthamstow were champions, winning their first Essex Senior League title and were promoted to the Southern League. Runners-up Saffron Walden Town lost interstep playoff match.

== League table ==
Essex Senior Football League
- Season: 2021–22
- Champions: Walthamstow
- Promoted: Walthamstow
- Relegated: Sporting Bengal United; St Margaretsbury
- Matches: 420
- Goals: 1,405 (3.35 per match)
- Top goalscorer: Richard Kone (31 goals)

Pos	Team	Pld	W	D	L	GF	GA	GD	Pts	Promotion, qualification or relegation
1	Walthamstow	40	28	8	4	92	30	+62	92	Promoted to the Southern League
2	Saffron Walden Town	40	26	5	9	101	48	+53	83	Qualified for an inter-step play-off (Note: Contested an inter-step play-off match as one of the six runners-up from Step 5 with the fewest points per game (PPG) at the end of the 2021–22 season against one of the six third-from-bottom clubs also with the fewest PPG from the eight divisions at Step 4. The winner stayed at Step 4 for the 2022–23 season, while the loser remained at Step 5.)
3	Redbridge	40	24	9	7	89	50	+39	81	
4	Stansted	40	22	9	9	81	45	+36	75	
5	Enfield	40	22	7	11	82	40	+42	73	
6	Little Oakley	40	20	10	10	83	53	+30	70	
7	FC Clacton	40	20	7	13	71	61	+10	67	
8	Athletic Newham	40	18	12	10	78	55	+23	66	
9	Cockfosters	40	17	9	14	78	65	+13	60	Transferred to the Spartan South Midlands League
10	Takeley	40	18	6	16	73	73	0	60	
11	White Ensign	40	16	11	13	85	67	+18	59	
12	Stanway Rovers	40	16	9	15	67	52	+15	57	
13	West Essex	40	16	9	15	68	67	+1	57	
14	Woodford Town	40	16	7	17	68	64	+4	55	
15	Hoddesdon Town	40	15	9	16	54	63	−9	54	Transferred to the Spartan South Midlands League
16	Ilford	40	11	8	21	43	72	−29	41	
17	Southend Manor	40	9	7	24	39	87	−48	34	
18	Clapton	40	6	9	25	45	90	−45	27	
19	Sawbridgeworth Town	40	7	6	27	37	94	−57	27	
20	St Margaretsbury (Note: Relegated as one of four clubs with the fewest PPG out of 16 that were second-from-bottom at Step 5.)	40	6	7	27	40	89	−49	25	Relegated to the Eastern Counties League
21	Sporting Bengal United	40	3	4	33	31	140	−109	13	Relegated to the Eastern Counties League

Source: Essex Senior League
Rules for classification: 1) Points; 2) Goal difference; 3) Number of goals scored; 4) Number of matches won; 5) Head-to-head results

=== Inter-step play-off ===
30 April 2022	Witham Town	3–0	Saffron Walden Town	Witham
15:00 BST	McLean 41'; Osude 56'; Wallace 63'			Stadium: Spa Road; Attendance: 697

== Results ==
Home \ Away	ATH	CLA	COC	ENF	CLC	HOD	ILF	OAK	RED	SAF	SAW	SOU	SBU	STM	STS	STN	TAK	WAL	WSX	WHI	WOD
Athletic Newham	—	2–1	4–1	1–1	1–0	4–1	3–0	1–1	2–2	3–1	2–2	6–0	2–1	6–1	1–2	1–1	3–6	0–2	2–1	0–0	1–3
Clapton	2–0	—	1–2	1–4	0–4	1–2	1–3	0–2	0–2	0–5	2–1	0–0	4–1	1–2	1–2	2–2	2–4	0–4	0–5	0–2	0–4
Cockfosters	0–1	1–1	—	1–1	2–3	1–0	0–0	1–2	3–1	2–1	4–1	0–0	5–0	5–1	4–3	1–2	2–1	0–2	5–1	1–1	6–1
Enfield	1–2	2–0	3–1	—	1–2	5–0	4–2	1–0	2–2	0–1	5–1	0–1	2–0	0–0	1–0	2–0	0–1	3–1	6–1	4–0	1–1
F.C. Clacton	1–0	4–0	1–0	2–1	—	0–1	0–1	1–1	2–0	0–1	3–1	1–1	1–0	1–5	0–4	3–1	2–0	0–0	0–1	1–4	1–3
Hoddesdon Town	2–0	1–1	1–1	1–1	3–1	—	0–0	2–2	1–2	0–5	1–0	2–0	4–3	3–1	2–1	2–0	3–1	2–0	3–0	1–4	1–2
Ilford	2–3	0–3	1–1	1–2	0–1	1–3	—	1–1	2–3	0–1	1–0	2–1	1–3	2–0	1–3	0–2	1–1	0–3	2–1	2–2	2–1
Little Oakley	1–1	3–5	1–4	2–3	3–4	3–0	0–0	—	1–3	1–2	4–1	4–0	8–0	1–1	4–3	0–3	1–0	2–0	3–0	4–3	2–1
Redbridge	2–2	3–1	2–1	3–1	1–3	3–1	1–2	1–1	—	2–2	2–0	1–1	4–0	1–1	0–1	3–1	2–1	0–2	1–1	3–2	4–2
Saffron Walden Town	2–2	3–0	4–0	1–0	2–3	2–0	4–3	0–1	1–3	—	2–0	4–2	3–0	2–0	1–0	1–2	7–1	2–3	4–1	3–3	3–1
Sawbridgesworth Town	0–6	1–1	2–1	1–5	0–4	2–0	3–0	1–5	0–3	0–3	—	3–0	1–1	0–1	1–1	1–0	1–2	1–3	4–1	0–2	1–3
Southend Manor	3–4	1–0	3–5	0–4	1–2	1–1	0–2	2–3	0–3	1–3	1–0	—	2–1	1–1	0–1	1–0	1–0	1–8	0–3	2–1	0–1
Sporting Bengal United	0–2	1–1	1–5	0–5	1–5	2–1	0–2	1–2	1–5	0–7	2–2	0–3	—	1–1	0–2	0–6	0–3	0–2	2–3	1–4	1–0
St Margaretsbury	1–1	3–1	1–2	0–2	2–3	1–1	0–1	1–3	2–3	1–2	5–1	0–3	2–1	—	1–5	0–2	0–1	0–2	1–3	0–5	1–2
Stansted	2–0	2–2	3–1	0–0	3–0	1–1	5–1	1–3	1–3	1–0	2–1	2–1	9–2	5–1	—	0–2	1–1	1–2	1–1	2–0	3–0
Stanway Rovers	3–3	0–0	3–0	4–0	4–4	1–3	0–0	2–1	2–2	2–4	1–2	4–0	3–0	1–0	0–1	—	5–0	0–3	0–0	3–2	0–3
Takeley	2–2	2–1	1–2	1–4	4–2	3–0	2–1	0–3	1–4	4–1	4–0	4–1	4–1	3–1	2–2	1–0	—	2–2	1–0	1–2	1–5
Walthamstow	2–1	3–0	1–1	2–1	2–0	2–2	3–0	4–2	1–0	1–1	1–2	5–0	0–0	2–0	0–0	2–1	2–0	—	4–1	0–0	2–1
West Essex	2–0	3–2	0–2	0–1	2–2	1–0	2–1	0–0	2–3	1–4	4–1	4–0	8–1	3–0	2–2	2–1	2–4	1–1	—	1–1	1–0
White Ensign	0–2	3–3	8–3	1–0	4–3	2–1	4–1	0–0	0–1	2–4	0–0	3–2	7–0	2–1	1–2	1–1	3–2	2–5	1–1	—	2–3
Woodford Town	0–1	1–4	1–1	2–3	1–1	2–1	4–1	1–2	0–0	2–2	2–0	4–2	4–1	0–0	1–2	1–2	1–1	0–4	1–2	3–1	—

Source: The FA Full-Time
Legend: Blue = home team win; Yellow = draw; Red = away team win.

== Stadia and locations ==
Locations of the Essex Senior League clubs
Greater London Essex Senior League football clubs

Club	Location	Stadium	Capacity
Athletic Newham	Plaistow	Terence McMillan Stadium	2,000
Clapton	Plaistow	Terence McMillan Stadium	2,000
Cockfosters	Cockfosters	Chalk Lane	1,000
Enfield	Bishop's Stortford	Woodside Park (groundshare with Bishop's Stortford)	4,525 (525 seated)
FC Clacton	Clacton-on-Sea	Austin Arena	3,000 (200 seated)
Hoddesdon Town	Hoddesdon	Lowfield	3,000 (100 seated)
Ilford	Ilford	Cricklefield Stadium	3,500 (216 seated)
Little Oakley	Little Oakley	Memorial Ground	
Redbridge	Barkingside	Oakside Stadium	3,000 (316 seated)
Saffron Walden Town	Saffron Walden	Catons Lane	2,000
Sawbridgeworth Town	Sawbridgeworth	Crofters End	2,500 (175 seated)
Sporting Bengal United	Mile End	Mile End Stadium	2,000 (439 seated)
Southend Manor	Southend-on-Sea	Southchurch Park	2,000 (500 seated)
St Margaretsbury	Stanstead Abbotts	Recreation Ground	1,000 (60 seated)
Stansted	Stansted Mountfitchet	Hargrave Park	2,000 (200 seated)
Stanway Rovers	Stanway	Hawthorns	1,500 (100 seated)
Takeley	Takeley	Station Road	2,000
Walthamstow	Walthamstow	Wadham Lodge	3,500
West Essex	Walthamstow	Wadham Lodge	3,500
White Ensign	Great Wakering	Burroughs Park (groundshare with Great Wakering Rovers)	3,000 (250 seated)
Woodford Town	Woodford	Ashton Playing Fields	
