= Paul Smyth (footballer) =

Northern Irish footballer (born 1997)

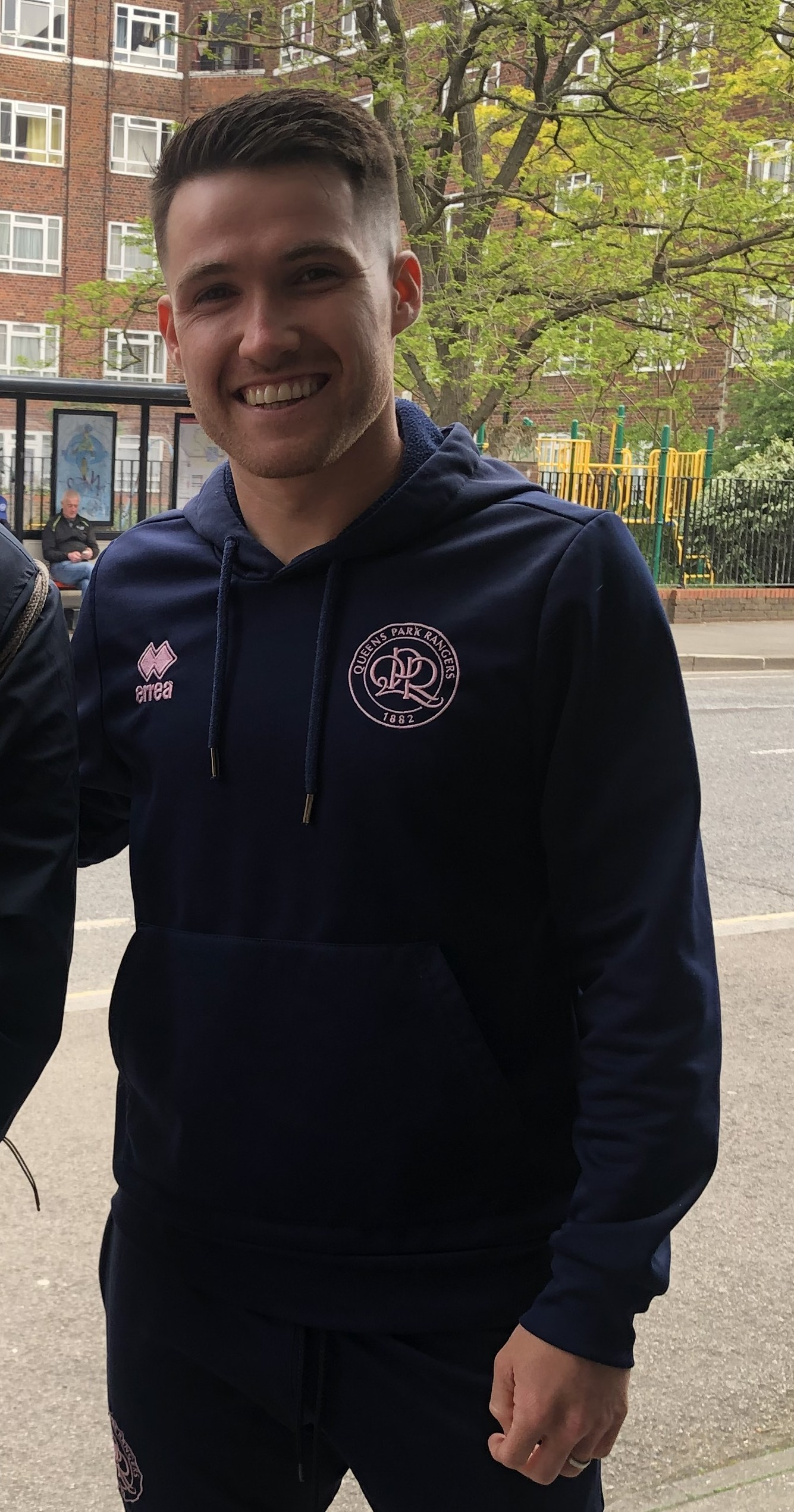
- Smyth with Queens Park Rangers in 2025.

Personal information
- Full name: Paul Patrick Smyth
- Date of birth: 10 September 1997 (age 29)
- Place of birth: Belfast, Northern Ireland
- Height: 1.73 m (5 ft 8 in)
- Position: Forward

Team information
- Current team: Queens Park Rangers
- Number: 11

Youth career
- –2015: Linfield

Senior career*
| Years | Team | Apps | (Gls) |
| 2015–2017 | Linfield | 52 | (14) |
| 2017–2021 | Queens Park Rangers | 19 | (2) |
| 2019 | → Accrington Stanley (loan) | 15 | (3) |
| 2019–2020 | → Wycombe Wanderers (loan) | 19 | (1) |
| 2020–2021 | → Charlton Athletic (loan) | 14 | (1) |
| 2021 | → Accrington Stanley (loan) | 21 | (3) |
| 2021–2023 | Leyton Orient | 62 | (13) |
| 2023– | Queens Park Rangers | 132 | (13) |

International career^{‡}
| 2016 | Northern Ireland U19 | 3 | (0) |
| 2016–2018 | Northern Ireland U21 | 13 | (1) |
| 2018– | Northern Ireland | 26 | (2) |
- * Club domestic league appearances and goals as of 17:13, 15 October 2026 (UTC) ‡ National team caps and goals as of 00:15, 18 November 2026 (UTC)

Paul Patrick Smyth (born 10 September 1997) is a Northern Irish professional footballer who plays as a forward for EFL Championship club Queens Park Rangers and the Northern Ireland national team.

== Club career ==
=== Linfield ===
Smyth broke into the Linfield first team as an 18-year-old in 2015, making his NIFL Premiership debut in a 2–1 defeat to Cliftonville on 14 November 2015. In the 2016–17 season he helped the club lift a treble of trophies; the NIFL Premiership, the Irish Cup, and the County Antrim Shield, while picking up a host of individual awards including the Ulster Young Player of the Year 2016–17.

=== Queens Park Rangers (first spell) ===
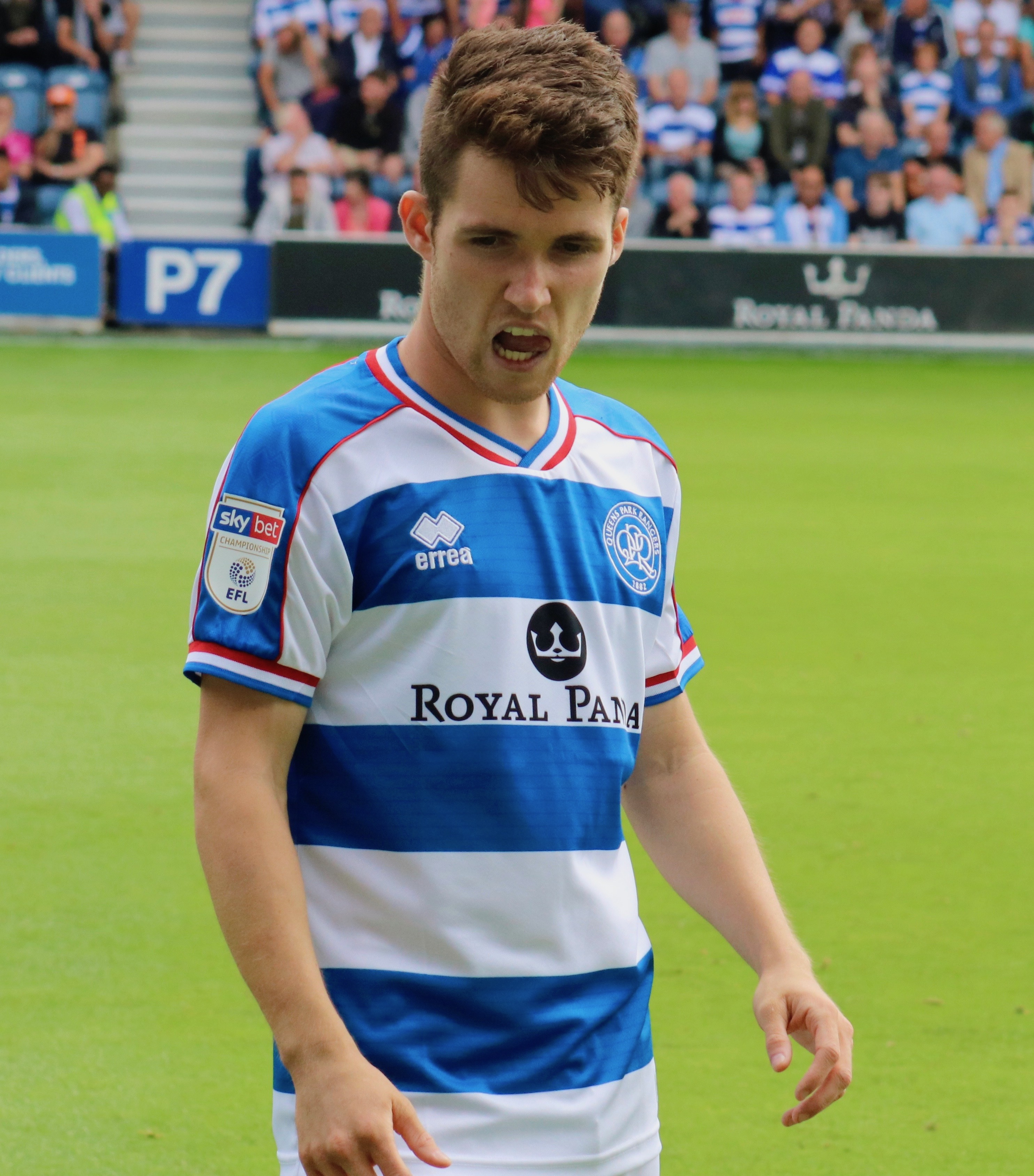
Smyth in action for Queens Park Rangers in 2018.

On 29 July 2017, Smyth joined Queens Park Rangers from Linfield for an undisclosed fee, signing a two-year contract.

On 1 January 2018, Smyth made his QPR and Championship debut against Cardiff City, scoring the winning goal in a 2–1 victory in the 72nd minute. His performances during the second half of the season earned him the club's Supporters' Young Player of the Year award.

After struggling for regular first-team opportunities during the 2018–19 season, Smyth joined Accrington Stanley on loan on 25 January 2019 for the remainder of the season. He scored his first goal for the club in a 2–2 draw against Sunderland on 9 February 2019, having also won a penalty earlier in the match. He was named man of the match for his performance. He scored three goals in 15 league appearances during the loan spell. In January 2019, he also agreed to extend his QPR contract until the summer of 2021.

On 19 July 2019, Smyth joined Wycombe Wanderers on a season-long loan in League One, reuniting with manager Gareth Ainsworth. He made 19 league appearances and scored once as Wycombe finished third and won promotion to the Championship through the play-offs, defeating Oxford United 2–1 in the final at Wembley Stadium.

On 16 October 2020, Smyth joined Charlton Athletic on a season-long loan in League One

=== Leyton Orient ===
Upon the expiry of his contract with Queens Park Rangers, Leyton Orient announced the signing of Smyth on 25 June 2021 on a two-year contract. He joined the club while they were competing in League Two, with manager Kenny Jackett highlighting his pace, mobility and ability to trouble opposition defenders. Smyth scored three league goals during his first season as Orient finished 13th in the table.

Smyth enjoyed a more productive second season in 2022–23, scoring 10 league goals as Orient won the League Two title and secured promotion to League One. He was the club's leading league goalscorer, making 38 league appearances and contributing to their successful promotion campaign.

His performances attracted interest from his former club QPR, and on 27 June 2023 he returned to Loftus Road after turning down a new contract at Orient. He left having scored 13 league goals in 62 appearances for the club across two seasons.

=== Queens Park Rangers (second spell) ===
On 27 June 2023, Smyth rejoined Queens Park Rangers on a three-year contract, returning to the club after two seasons at Leyton Orient. His return followed a successful spell in League Two, during which he had helped Orient win promotion. QPR manager Gareth Ainsworth, under whom Smyth had previously played at Wycombe Wanderers, praised his contribution to Orient's attacking play and expressed confidence that he could make a greater impact in the Championship than during his first spell at the club.

Smyth featured regularly during the 2023–24 season, making 44 appearances in the Championship and scoring three goals as QPR finished 18th, avoiding relegation. His pace and direct attacking approach provided an option on the wing as the club sought to establish itself in the division.

During the 2024–25 season, Smyth continued to feature regularly, making 43 Championship appearances and scoring once, while also recording four assists in the league.

In the 2025–26 season, Smyth scored six Championship goals, his highest league total for QPR in a single season since returning to the club. On 4 October 2025, he scored the winning goal in a 2–1 victory over Bristol City, heading home late in the match after QPR had come from behind.

== International career ==
Having played for Northern Ireland U21 on 22 March 2018, Smyth was called into the senior Northern Ireland squad for the friendly with South Korea on 24 March 2018. He made his debut as an 82nd minute substitute and scored the winning goal in a 2–1 victory three minutes later.

== Career statistics ==
=== Club ===
As of match played 14 October 2026

Appearances and goals by club, season and competition
| Club | Season | League | | | National cup (Note: Includes Irish Cup, FA Cup) | | League cup (Note: Includes EFL Cup) | | Other | | Total | |
| Club | Season | Division | Apps | Goals | Apps | Goals | Apps | Goals | Apps | Goals | Apps | Goals |
|---|---|---|---|---|---|---|---|---|---|---|---|---|
| Linfield | 2015–16 | NIFL Premiership | 19 | 5 | 5 | 0 | 0 | 0 | 0 | 0 | 24 | 5 |
| Linfield | 2016–17 | NIFL Premiership | 29 | 8 | 3 | 0 | 0 | 0 | 2 (Note: Two appearances in UEFA Europa League) | 0 | 34 | 8 |
| Linfield | 2017–18 | NIFL Premiership | 4 | 1 | 0 | 0 | 0 | 0 | 5 (Note: Four appearances in UEFA Champions League, one appearance and one goal in NIFL Charity Shield) | 1 | 9 | 2 |
| Linfield | Total | | 52 | 14 | 8 | 0 | 0 | 0 | 7 | 1 | 67 | 15 |
| Queens Park Rangers | 2017–18 | Championship | 13 | 2 | 1 | 0 | 0 | 0 | — | | 14 | 2 |
| Queens Park Rangers | 2018–19 | Championship | 3 | 0 | 0 | 0 | 2 | 0 | — | | 5 | 0 |
| Queens Park Rangers | 2019–20 | Championship | 0 | 0 | 0 | 0 | 0 | 0 | — | | 0 | 0 |
| Queens Park Rangers | 2020–21 | Championship | 3 | 0 | 0 | 0 | 1 | 0 | — | | 4 | 0 |
| Queens Park Rangers | Total | | 19 | 2 | 1 | 0 | 3 | 0 | — | | 23 | 2 |
| Accrington Stanley (loan) | 2018–19 | League One | 15 | 3 | 1 | 0 | 0 | 0 | 0 | 0 | 16 | 3 |
| Wycombe Wanderers (loan) | 2019–20 | League One | 19 | 1 | 1 | 0 | 0 | 0 | 1 (Note: Appearance(s) in EFL Trophy) | 0 | 21 | 1 |
| Charlton Athletic (loan) | 2020–21 | League One | 14 | 1 | 0 | 0 | 0 | 0 | 0 | 0 | 14 | 1 |
| Accrington Stanley (loan) | 2020–21 | League One | 21 | 3 | 0 | 0 | 0 | 0 | 0 | 0 | 21 | 3 |
| Leyton Orient | 2021–22 | League Two | 24 | 3 | 1 | 0 | 0 | 0 | 1 | 1 | 26 | 4 |
| Leyton Orient | 2022–23 | League Two | 38 | 10 | 1 | 0 | 1 | 0 | 2 | 0 | 42 | 10 |
| Leyton Orient | Total | | 62 | 13 | 2 | 0 | 1 | 0 | 3 | 1 | 68 | 14 |
| Queens Park Rangers | 2023–24 | Championship | 44 | 3 | 1 | 0 | 0 | 0 | — | | 45 | 3 |
| Queens Park Rangers | 2024–25 | Championship | 43 | 1 | 1 | 0 | 3 | 1 | — | | 47 | 2 |
| Queens Park Rangers | 2025–26 | Championship | 36 | 6 | 1 | 0 | 0 | 0 | — | | 37 | 6 |
| Queens Park Rangers | 2026–27 | Championship | 9 | 3 | 0 | 0 | 1 | 0 | 0 | 0 | 10 | 3 |
| Queens Park Rangers | Total | | 132 | 13 | 3 | 0 | 4 | 1 | 0 | 0 | 139 | 14 |
| Career total | | | 334 | 50 | 16 | 0 | 8 | 1 | 11 | 2 | 369 | 53 |

=== International ===
As of match played 17 November 2026

Appearances and goals by national team and year
| National team | Year | Apps | Goals |
|---|---|---|---|
| Northern Ireland | 2018 | 2 | 1 |
| Northern Ireland | 2019 | 0 | 0 |
| Northern Ireland | 2020 | 0 | 0 |
| Northern Ireland | 2021 | 1 | 0 |
| Northern Ireland | 2022 | 0 | 0 |
| Northern Ireland | 2023 | 5 | 1 |
| Northern Ireland | 2024 | 8 | 0 |
| Northern Ireland | 2025 | 6 | 0 |
| Northern Ireland | 2026 | 4 | 0 |
| Total | | 26 | 2 |

=== International goals ===
As of match played 25 March 2025. Northern Ireland score listed first, score column indicates score after each Smyth goal.

International goals by date, venue, cap, opponent, score, result and competition
| No. | Date | Venue | Cap | Opponent | Score | Result | Competition |
|---|---|---|---|---|---|---|---|
| 1 | 24 March 2018 | Windsor Park, Belfast, Northern Ireland | 1 | South Korea | 2–1 | 2–1 | Friendly |
| 2 | 14 October 2023 | Windsor Park, Belfast, Northern Ireland | 6 | San Marino | 1–0 | 3–0 | UEFA Euro 2024 qualification |

== Honours ==
Linfield

- NIFL Premiership: 2016–17
- Irish Cup: 2016–17
- County Antrim Shield: 2016–17
- NIFL Charity Shield: 2017

Leyton Orient

- EFL League Two: 2022–23

Individual

- PFA Team of the Year: 2022–23 League Two
