= Emmerson Sutton =

English footballer (born 2006)

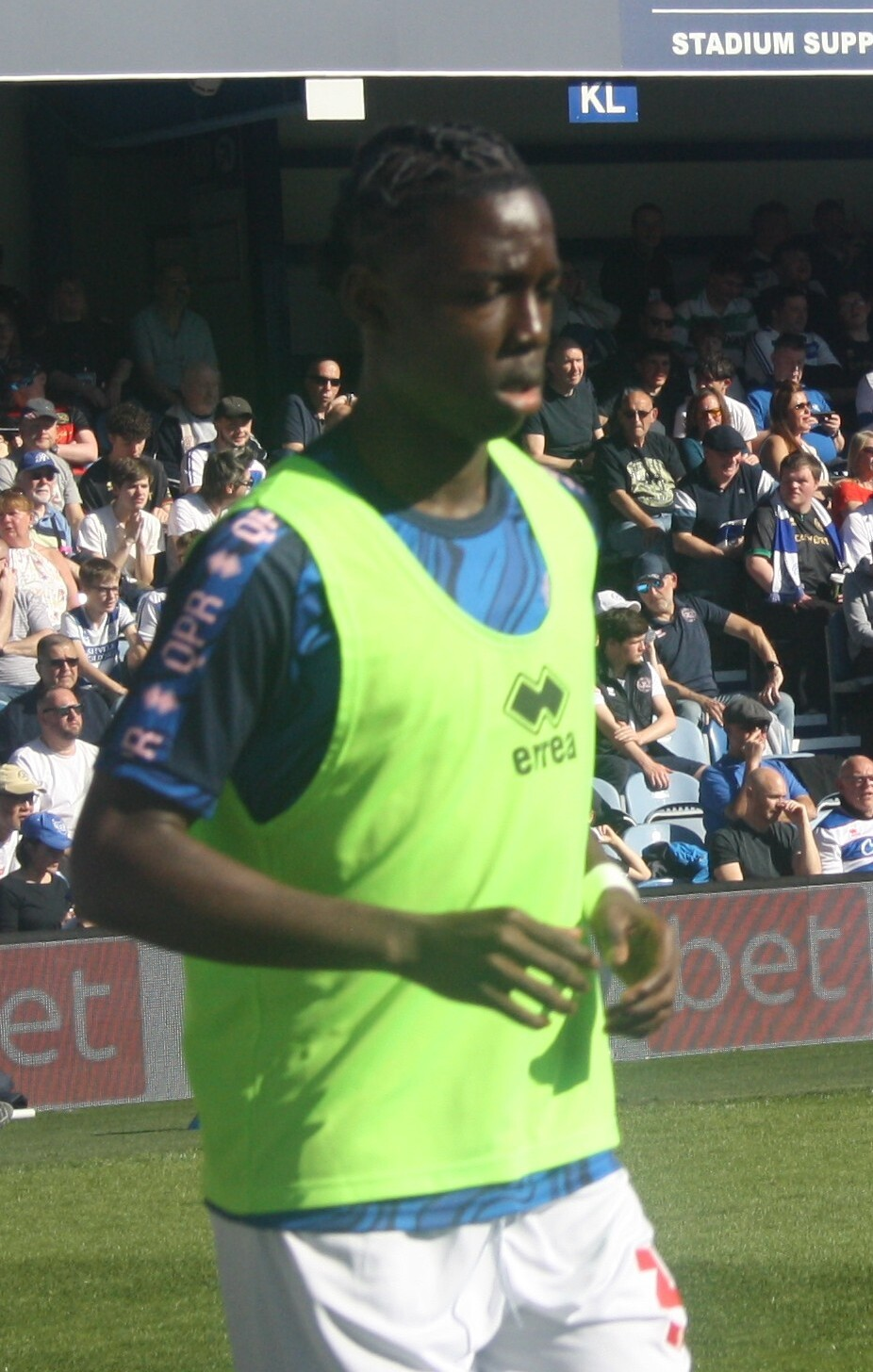
- Sutton in 2025

Personal information
- Full name: Emmerson Malachi Hopeton Sutton
- Date of birth: 28 December 2006 (age 19)
- Place of birth: Lewisham, London, England
- Position: Winger

Team information
- Current team: Worthing (on loan from Queens Park Rangers)

Youth career
- 2018–2024: Queens Park Rangers

Senior career*
| Years | Team | Apps | (Gls) |
| 2024– | Queens Park Rangers | 2 | (0) |
| 2024–2025 | → Hanwell Town (loan) | 11 | (0) |
| 2025–2026 | → Morecambe (loan) | 16 | (1) |
| 2026 | → Harrogate Town (loan) | 9 | (1) |
| 2026– | → Worthing (loan) | 2 | (0) |
- * Club domestic league appearances and goals as of 15:53, 30 September 2026 (UTC)

Emmerson Malachi Hopeton Sutton (born 28 December 2006) is an English professional footballer who plays as a winger for National League club Worthing on loan from EFL Championship club Queens Park Rangers.

== Career ==
Born in Lewisham, Sutton joined the Queens Park Rangers at under-12 level.

In October 2024, Sutton joined Southern League Premier Division South side Hanwell Town on a work-experience loan deal. In January 2025, he returned to Queens Park Rangers and signed a first professional contract. Prior to the new contract, he had been linked with a number of Premier League clubs, having drawn comparisons to another former Queens Park Rangers player, Ebere Eze.

On 21 April 2025, Sutton made his professional debut as a second-half substitute in a 2–1 defeat to Swansea City.

On 17 September 2025, Sutton joined Morecambe on loan. On 13 January 2026, the loan was extended until the end of the season. On 14 January 2026, Sutton was recalled from his loan at Morecambe. He joined Harrogate Town on loan on 23 January 2026. He scored his first professional EFL goal against Cambridge ending their 14 match unbeaten run.

On 25 September 2026, Sutton joined National League side Worthing on a two-month loan deal.

== Career statistics ==
As of end of 2025–26 season

Appearances and goals by club, season and competition
| Club | Season | League | | | FA Cup | | League Cup | | Other | | Total | |
| Club | Season | Division | Apps | Goals | Apps | Goals | Apps | Goals | Apps | Goals | Apps | Goals |
|---|---|---|---|---|---|---|---|---|---|---|---|---|
| Queens Park Rangers | 2024–25 | Championship | 2 | 0 | 0 | 0 | 0 | 0 | — | | 2 | 0 |
| Queens Park Rangers | 2025–26 | Championship | 0 | 0 | 0 | 0 | 1 | 0 | — | | 1 | 0 |
| Queens Park Rangers | Total | | 2 | 0 | 0 | 0 | 1 | 0 | 0 | 0 | 3 | 0 |
| Hanwell Town (loan) | 2024–25 | Southern League Premier Division South | 11 | 0 | 0 | 0 | — | | 4 (Note: Two appearances in FA Trophy, one appearance in London Senior Cup, one appearance in Middlesex Senior Cup) | 0 | 14 | 0 |
| Morecambe (loan) | 2025–26 | National League | 16 | 1 | 2 | 0 | — | | 2 (Note: Appearance(s) in FA Trophy) | 0 | 20 | 1 |
| Harrogate Town (loan) | 2025–26 | League Two | 9 | 1 | 0 | 0 | 0 | 0 | 0 | 0 | 9 | 1 |
| Career total | | | 38 | 2 | 2 | 0 | 1 | 0 | 6 | 0 | 47 | 2 |
