= Rhys Norrington-Davies =

Welsh footballer

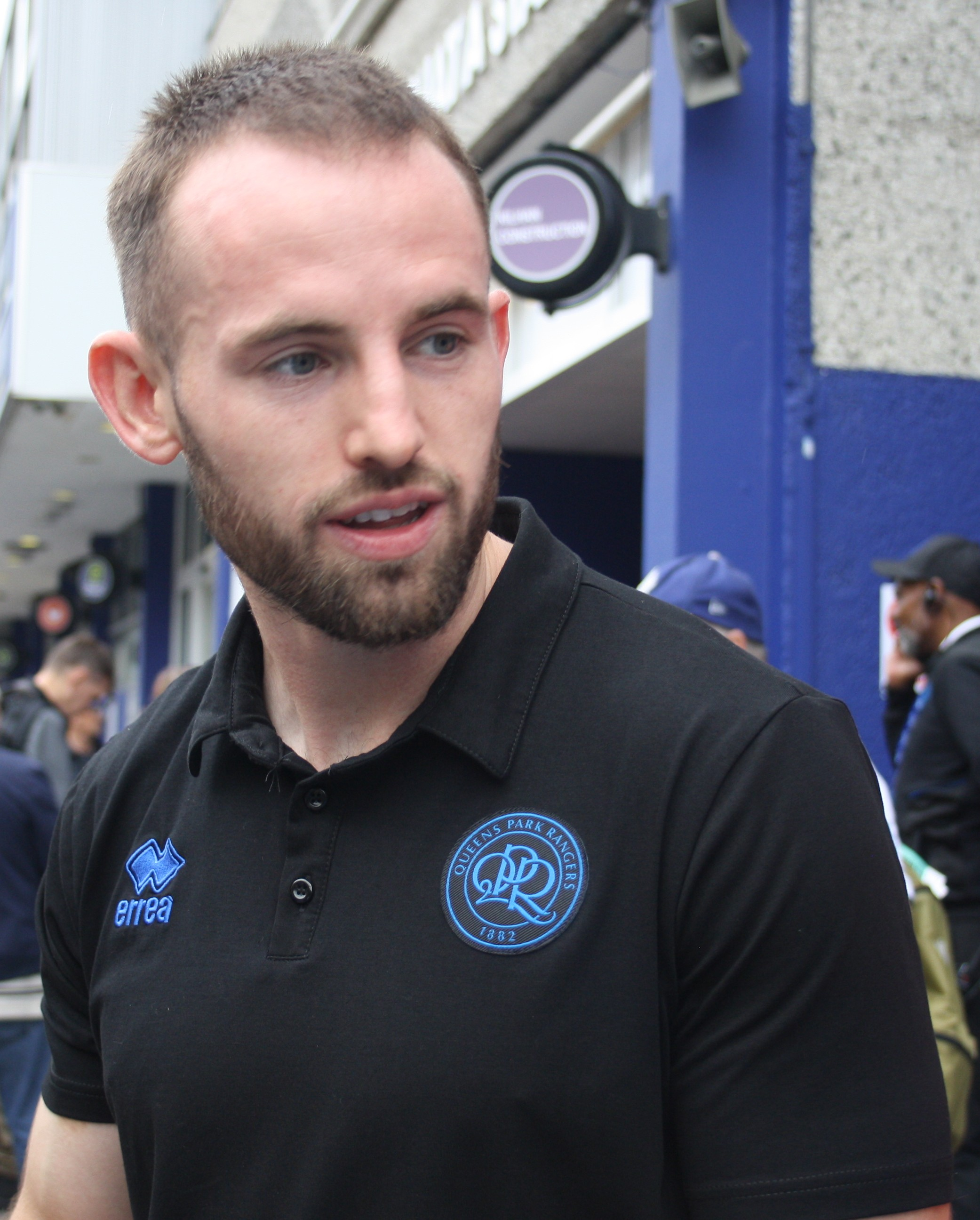
- Norrington-Davies in 2025.

Personal information
- Full name: Rhys Llewelyn Norrington-Davies
- Date of birth: 22 April 1999 (age 27)
- Place of birth: Riyadh, Saudi Arabia
- Height: 1.81 m (5 ft 11 1/2 in)
- Position: Left-back

Team information
- Current team: Sheffield United
- Number: 30

Youth career
- Bow Street
- Aberystwyth Town
- Merstham
- –2017: Swansea City
- 2017–2018: Sheffield United

Senior career*
Years	Team	Apps	(Gls)
2018–	Sheffield United	64	(0)
2018–2019	→ Barrow (loan)	28	(0)
2019–2020	→ Rochdale (loan)	27	(1)
2020–2021	→ Luton Town (loan)	18	(0)
2021	→ Stoke City (loan)	20	(1)
2025–2026	→ Queens Park Rangers (loan)	38	(1)

International career^{‡}
2017	Wales U19	3	(0)
2017–2019	Wales U21	14	(0)
2020–	Wales	17	(1)
- * Club domestic league appearances and goals as of 13:25, 19 September 2026 (UTC) ‡ National team caps and goals as of 23,23, 6 June 2026 (UTC)

Rhys Llewelyn Norrington-Davies (born 22 April 1999) is a Welsh professional footballer who plays as a left-back for EFL Championship club Sheffield United and the Wales national team.

== Early life ==
Norrington-Davies was born in Riyadh, Saudi Arabia to Welsh parents from Aberystwyth. His father, Patrick, was working in Saudi Arabia with the British Army. Due to the nature of his father's job, Norrington-Davies' family moved frequently during his childhood, spending time in Kenya, London, and in Aberystwyth, where he was educated at Ysgol Penglais, and Royal Russell School in Croydon, South London.

== Club career ==
Norrington-Davies played at youth level for Bow Street, Aberystwyth Town, and Merstham. He played for Swansea City, before joining Sheffield United's academy in 2017. He joined Barrow on a one-month loan in September 2018, before the loan was extended to the end of the season in October. He moved on loan to Rochdale in July 2019 on a season-long loan.

Norrington-Davies joined Championship club Luton Town on a season-long loan on 3 September 2020. On 12 January 2021, he was recalled by Sheffield United after making 22 appearances in all competitions, and was loaned to Stoke City later that day. He played 20 times for Stoke, scoring once in a 2–0 win over Wycombe Wanderers on 6 March 2021.

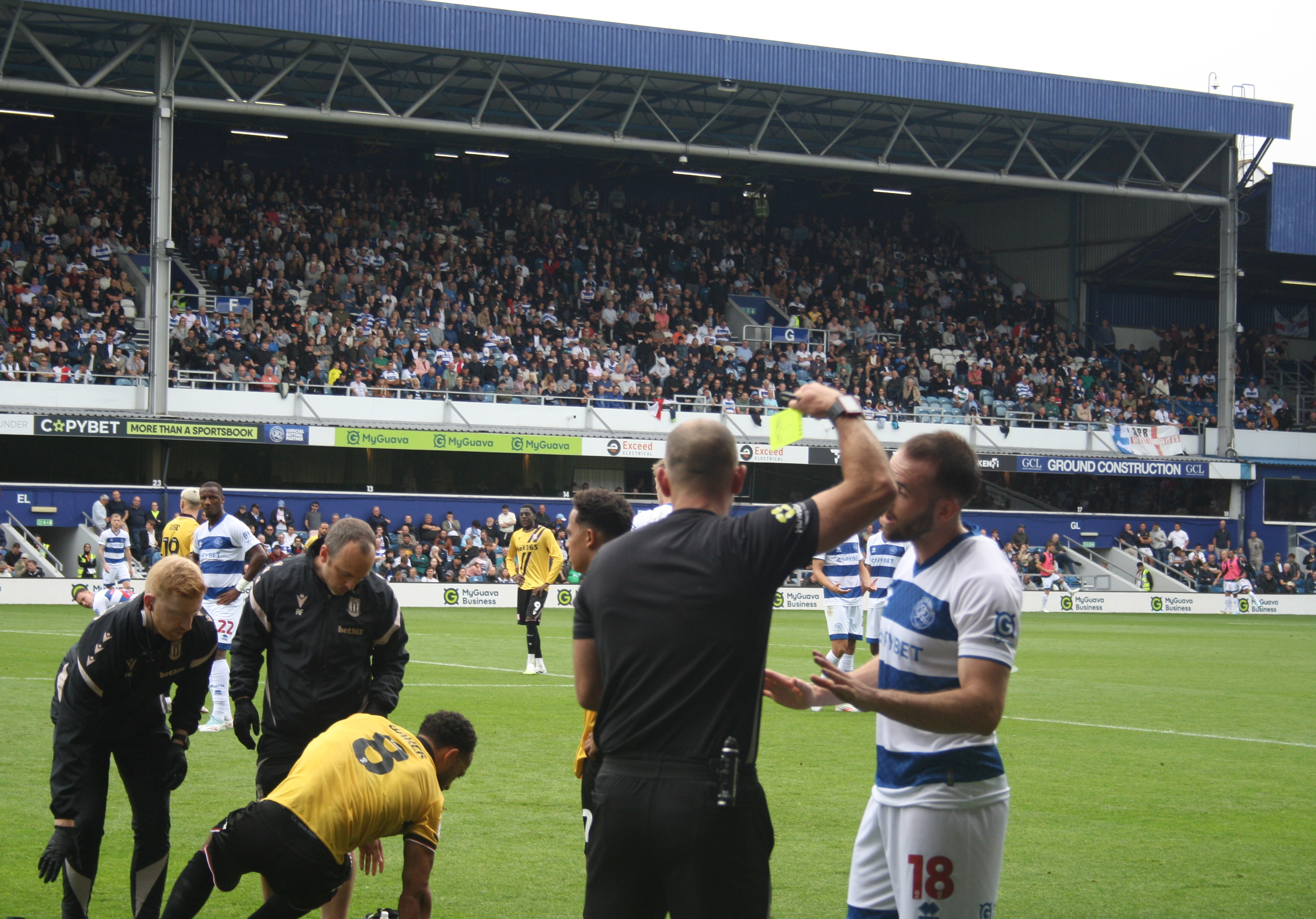
Norrington-Davies about to be booked by Tim Robinson during Queens Park Rangers’ match against Stoke City on 20 September 2025.

In August 2024, he signed a new contract with Sheffield United. In August 2025 he signed on loan for Queens Park Rangers.

== International career ==
Norrington-Davies is a Wales under-19 and under-21 international. He was called up to the senior Wales squad for the first time in October 2020. He made his full international debut for Wales on 14 October 2020 in the starting line-up for the 1–0 Nations League win against Bulgaria.

In May 2021 he was selected to the Wales squad for the delayed UEFA Euro 2020 tournament.

He scored his first goal for Wales in their UEFA Nations League match against the Netherlands on 8 June 2022.

== Career statistics ==
As of match played 19 September 2026

Appearances and goals by club, season and competition
Club	Season	League			FA Cup		EFL Cup		Other		Total	
Club	Season	Division	Apps	Goals	Apps	Goals	Apps	Goals	Apps	Goals	Apps	Goals
Sheffield United	2018–19	Championship	0	0	0	0	0	0	—		0	0
Sheffield United	2019–20	Premier League	0	0	0	0	0	0	—		0	0
Sheffield United	2020–21	Premier League	0	0	0	0	0	0	—		0	0
Sheffield United	2021–22	Championship	22	0	1	0	1	0	2 (Note: Appearances in EFL Championship play-offs)	0	26	0
Sheffield United	2022–23	Championship	15	0	0	0	0	0	—		15	0
Sheffield United	2023–24	Premier League	5	0	2	0	0	0	—		7	0
Sheffield United	2024–25	Championship	14	0	1	0	2	0	—		17	0
Sheffield United	2025–26	Championship	1	0	0	0	0	0	—		1	0
Sheffield United	2026–27	Championship	7	0	0	0	3	0	—		10	0
Sheffield United	Total		64	0	4	0	6	0	2	0	76	0
Barrow (loan)	2018–19	National League	28	0	1	0	—		0	0	29	0
Rochdale (loan)	2019–20	League One	27	1	4	0	2	0	1 (Note: Appearance in EFL Trophy)	0	34	1
Luton Town (loan)	2020–21	Championship	18	0	1	0	3	0	—		22	0
Stoke City (loan)	2020–21	Championship	20	1	0	0	0	0	—		20	1
Queens Park Rangers (loan)	2025–26	Championship	38	1	1	0	0	0	—		39	1
Career total			195	3	11	0	11	0	3	0	220	3
