= Kalen Brunson =

English association football player (born 2009)

Personal information
- Date of birth: 17 April 2009 (age 17)
- Place of birth: Bermuda
- Position: Midfielder

Team information
- Current team: Queens Park Rangers

Youth career
- PHC Zebras
- 2024–2025: Queens Park Rangers

Senior career*
Years	Team	Apps	(Gls)
2025–	Queens Park Rangers	0	(0)

International career^{‡}
2025–	Bermuda U17	3	(3)
2026–	Bermuda U20	4	(1)
- * Club domestic league appearances and goals as of 18:46, 3 September 2025 (UTC) ‡ National team caps and goals as of 00:50, 27 September 2026 (UTC)

Kalen Brunson (born 17 April 2009) is a Bermudian professional footballer who plays as a midfielder for EFL Championship club Queens Park Rangers. He is a Bermuda youth international.

== Club career ==
=== Queens Park Rangers ===
Born in Bermuda, Brunson joined Queens Park Rangers in December 2024, having previously played for his boyhood club, PHC Zebras. In April 2025, he signed a two-year scholarship with the club, committing his future until June 2027.

On 12 August 2025, he made his first-team debut for Queens Park Rangers in a 3–2 away defeat to Plymouth Argyle in the EFL Cup, replacing fellow academy graduate debutant, Jaiden Putman with four minutes remaining. Brunson is also listed as a graduate of the AF Global Football academy programme.

== International career ==
On 8 February 2025, Brunson first made his Bermudian national youth team debut for the under-17 side during a 6–1 defeat to Curaçao. Just under a week later, he scored a hat-trick in their 5–0 away victory over Turks and Caicos Islands.

== Career statistics ==
As of match played 12 August 2025

Appearances and goals by club, season and competition
Club	Season	League			FA Cup		EFL Cup		Other		Total	
Club	Season	Division	Apps	Goals	Apps	Goals	Apps	Goals	Apps	Goals	Apps	Goals
Queens Park Rangers	2025–26	Championship	0	0	0	0	1	0	—		1	0
Career total			0	0	0	0	1	0	0	0	1	0

== Honours ==
=== Club ===
Queens Park Rangers Development Squad

- London Senior Cup champions: 2025–26
