= 2025–26 Queens Park Rangers F.C. season =

English football club season

Queens Park Rangers
2025–26 season
- Owner: Ruben Gnanalingam (60%); Richard Reilly (21%); Lakshmi Mittal (19%)
- Chairman: Lee Hoos
- Manager: Julien Stéphan
- Stadium: Loftus Road
- EFL Championship: 15th
- FA Cup: Third round
- EFL Cup: First Round
- Top goalscorer: League: Rumarn Burrell (10) & Richard Kone (10); All: Richard Kone (11)
- Highest home attendance: 17,505 (v. Ipswich Town, EFL Championship, 1 November 2025)
- Lowest home attendance: 13,835 (v. Swansea City, EFL Championship, 21 April 2026)
- Average home league attendance: 16,840
- Biggest win: 6–1 v. Portsmouth (H); EFL Championship, 21 March 2026
- Biggest defeat: 1–7 v. Coventry City (A); EFL Championship, 23 August 2025
Home colours	Away colours	Third colours

The 2025–26 season was the 144th season in the history of Queens Park Rangers Football Club and their eleventh consecutive season in the Championship. In addition to the domestic league, the club would also participate in the FA Cup, and the EFL Cup.

On 24 June 2025, after a two-month period of gardening leave, head coach Martí Cifuentes left the club by mutual consent. On the following day, Julien Stéphan was announced as the club's new head coach.

== Squad ==
As of 3 May 2026

No.	Name	Nationality	Position(s)	Since	Date of birth (age)	Signed from	Apps	Goals
Goalkeepers
1	Paul Nardi	(France)	GK	2024	18 May 1994 (age 32)	(Belgium) Gent	63	0
13	Joe Walsh	(England)	GK	2021	1 April 2002 (age 24)	(England) Gillingham	31	0
29	Ben Hamer	(England)	GK	2025	20 November 1987 (age 39)	(England) Sheffield Wednesday	7	0
32	Matteo Salamon	(Brazil)	GK	2015	8 February 2004 (age 22)	(England) QPR Academy	0	0
Defenders
2	Kealey Adamson	(Australia)	RB	2025	17 February 2003 (age 23)	(Australia) Macarthur	8	0
3	Jimmy Dunne (captain)	(Republic of Ireland)	CB / RB	2021	19 October 1997 (age 29)	(England) Burnley	203	14
5	Steve Cook	(England)	CB	2023	19 April 1991 (age 35)	(England) Nottingham Forest	100	5
6	Jake Clarke-Salter	(England)	CB	2022	22 September 1997 (age 29)	(England) Chelsea	77	1
18	Rhys Norrington-Davies	(Wales)	LB	2025	22 April 1999 (age 27)	(England) Sheffield United	39	1
19	Timothy Akindileni	(Czech Republic)	CB	2025	4 September 2007 (age 19)	(Scotland) Aberdeen	0	0
27	Amadou Mbengue	(Senegal)	CB / RB	2025	5 January 2002 (age 24)	(England) Reading	42	2
28	Esquerdinha	(Brazil)	LB	2025	28 February 2006 (age 20)	(Brazil) Fluminese	16	0
30	Tylon Smith	(South Africa)	CB	2025	9 May 2005 (age 21)	(South Africa) Stellenbosch	4	0
37	Ronnie Edwards	(England)	CB	2026	28 March 2003 (age 23)	(England) Southampton	39	3
38	Ziyad Larkeche	(France)	LB / CB	2023	19 September 2002 (age 24)	(England) Fulham	22	0
43	Jaiden Putman	(England)	RB	2015	18 September 2006 (age 20)	(England) QPR Academy	1	0
44	Alex Wilkie	(England)	CB	2025	11 May 2006 (age 20)	(England) Eastleigh	1	0
Midfielders
7	Karamoko Dembélé	(England)	RW	2024	22 February 2003 (age 23)	(France) Brest	54	4
10	Ilias Chair	(Morocco)	AM / RM / LM	2017	30 October 1997 (age 29)	(Belgium) Lierse	280	38
11	Paul Smyth	(Northern Ireland)	RW / LW	2023	10 September 1997 (age 29)	(England) Leyton Orient	152	13
14	Kōki Saitō	(Japan)	LW	2024	10 August 2001 (age 25)	(Belgium) Lommel	77	6
15	Isaac Hayden	(Jamaica)	DM	2025	22 March 1995 (age 31)	(England) Newcastle United	47	0
17	Kwame Poku	(Ghana)	RW	2025	11 August 2001 (age 25)	(England) Peterborough United	16	0
20	Harvey Vale	(Republic of Ireland)	AM	2025	11 September 2003 (age 23)	(England) Chelsea	32	4
21	Kieran Morgan	(England)	DM / CM	2024	17 March 2006 (age 20)	(England) Tottenham Hotspur	61	3
23	Daniel Bennie	(Australia)	AM / LW	2024	14 April 2006 (age 20)	(Australia) Perth Glory	32	2
24	Nicolas Madsen	(Denmark)	CM	2024	17 March 2000 (age 26)	(Belgium) Westerlo	73	6
25	Jaylan Pearman	(Australia)	AM	2025	18 April 2005 (age 21)	(Australia) Perth Glory	1	0
40	Jonathan Varane	(Martinique)	CM / DM	2024	11 October 2001 (age 25)	(Spain) Sporting Gijón	79	2
48	Isak Alemayehu	(Sweden)	CM	2025	17 March 2006 (age 20)	(Australia) Djurgårdens	1	0
50	Kalen Brunson	(Bermuda)	LW	2024	17 March 2009 (age 17)	(England) QPR Academy	1	0
52	Leon Scarlett	(Wales)	LW	2024	16 August 2009 (age 17)	(England) Arsenal	1	0
55	Ashley Trujillo	(Colombia)	RW	2024	10 December 2008 (age 17)	(England) QPR Academy	1	0
Forwards
16	Rumarn Burrell	(Jamaica)	CF	2025	16 December 2000 (age 25)	(England) Burton Albion	31	10
22	Richard Kone	(Ivory Coast)	CF	2025	15 July 2003 (age 23)	(England) Wycombe Wanderers	44	11
26	Rayan Kolli	(Algeria)	CF / RW / LW	2023	10 February 2005 (age 21)	(England) QPR Academy	57	11
46	Justin Obikwu	(Trinidad and Tobago)	CF	2026	8 February 2004 (age 22)	(England) Coventry City	0	0
Out on loan
4	Liam Morrison	(Scotland)	CB	2024	7 April 2003 (age 23)	(Germany) Bayern Munich	33	0
8	Sam Field	(England)	CM / DM	2021	8 May 1998 (age 28)	(England) West Bromwich Albion	198	12
9	Žan Celar	(Slovenia)	CF	2024	14 March 1999 (age 27)	(Switzerland) Lugano	24	2
34	Elijah Dixon-Bonner	(England)	CM / DM	2022	1 January 2001 (age 25)	(England) Liverpool	34	0
36	Emmerson Sutton	(England)	CM	2023	28 December 2006 (age 19)	(England) QPR Academy	3	0
39	Teddy Tarbotton	(England)	CM	2020	29 July 2007 (age 19)	(England) Hull City	1	0
45	Cian Dillon	(Republic of Ireland)	CF	2025	4 April 2006 (age 20)	(Republic of Ireland) Shamrock Rovers	1	0
–	Murphy Cooper	(England)	GK	2012	27 December 2001 (age 24)	(England) Wycombe Wanderers	2	0
–	Alfie Lloyd	(England)	CF	2021	30 April 2003 (age 23)	(England) Yeovil Town	31	2
–	Hevertton Santos	(Brazil)	RB / LB	2024	1 February 2001 (age 25)	(Portugal) Estrela da Amadora	9	1
Left during the season
12	Michael Frey	(Switzerland)	CF	2024	19 July 1994 (age 32)	(Belgium) Royal Antwerp	53	10
52	Lorent Talla	(Kosovo)	CM / DM	2017	1 January 2005 (age 21)	(England) QPR Academy	2	0

=== Players from Queens Park Rangers Reserves and Academy ===
Note: Flags indicate national team as defined under FIFA eligibility rules; some limited exceptions apply. Players may hold more than one non-FIFA nationality.

No.	Pos.	Nation	Player
33	FW	ENG	Ridwan Hassan
35	GK	ENG	Charlie Warren
41	DF	ENG	Noah McCann
—	DF	ENG	Cory Adjetey-Brew
—	DF	NGR	Isaiah Balogun
—	MF	ENG	Jake Coomes

No.	Pos.	Nation	Player
—	MF	ENG	Kaleb Dyke
—	DF	SCO	Rocco Friel
—	GK	ENG	Joel Halliday
—	DF	ENG	Jake Leahy
—	DF	ENG	Jack McDowell
—	MF	ENG	Fraser Neill
—	MF	WAL	Alfie Tuck

== Season Summary ==
=== August ===
Queens Park Rangers started their 2025–26 Championship season on 9 August at Loftus Road against Preston North End. In a tight opening fixture, the hosts took the lead through a well-worked goal from new signing Richard Kone, only for Preston to equalise late on. The game finished 1–1.QPR travelled to Vicarage Road on 16 August to face Watford. Despite taking the lead through Ilias Chair, Watford fought back with two second-half goals to win 2–1.The heaviest defeat of the season came on 23 August as QPR were thrashed 7–1 away at Coventry City. The Sky Blues were clinical in front of goal, exposing defensive frailties in Julien Stéphan's side early in his tenure.QPR were eliminated from the EFL Cup in the first round on 12 August, losing 3–2 away to Plymouth Argyle. A spirited fightback fell short despite goals from Paul Smyth and another from Kone.On 30 August, QPR responded with a solid 3–1 away win at Charlton Athletic, with Richard Kone scoring twice as the new forward partnership began to click.

=== September ===
QPR picked up their first home win of the season on 13 September against Stoke City at Loftus Road. A disciplined performance saw them secure a 1–0 victory, with goalkeeper Paul Nardi making key saves.Mid-September brought mixed results, including a narrow away defeat and a goalless draw, as the side adjusted to Stéphan's tactical demands. Rumarn Burrell began to feature more prominently in attack alongside Kone.

=== October ===
October saw an upturn in form with an encouraging unbeaten run. Key results included a hard-fought 0–0 draw away at Oxford United and a 2–1 victory at Bristol City, where wingers like Paul Smyth and Kōki Saitō caused problems on the counter.Home form remained patchy, but the squad showed growing cohesion. New signings such as Isaac Hayden in midfield added steel, helping QPR climb into the top half of the table temporarily.

=== November ===
Consistency remained elusive. QPR suffered a heavy home defeat to promotion-chasing Ipswich Town (1–4) in front of a large crowd at Loftus Road on 1 November, highlighting gaps against top sides.They bounced back with gritty away performances, including a valuable point against a strong side. The month ended with QPR hovering around mid-table, showing signs of progress under Stéphan but still lacking the cutting edge needed for a sustained push.

=== December ===
The festive period delivered mixed results. QPR picked up vital points with a gritty 1–0 home win over Sheffield Wednesday on Boxing Day, but suffered a disappointing 3–1 loss away to Derby County. Defensive solidity improved, though attacking output remained inconsistent.

=== January ===
January brought squad strengthening with the arrival of centre-back Ronnie Edwards from Peterborough. On the pitch, results were steady rather than spectacular, with a 2–2 draw against Luton Town and a narrow 1–0 away victory at Millwall. Rumarn Burrell began to find consistent form, netting three goals during the month.

=== February ===
February marked a strong spell as QPR went unbeaten in five league games. Highlights included a 3–1 home win over Norwich City and a hard-earned 1–0 victory at Sunderland. The side looked well-organised and dangerous on the break, climbing to 12th in the table by the end of the month.

=== March ===
March delivered the season's highlight: a thumping 6–1 home victory over Portsmouth on 21 March, with multiple players getting on the scoresheet in an attacking masterclass. Form dipped again with inconsistent away results, but the attacking flair was evident. Burrell and Kone both reached double figures in league goals.

=== April ===
The run-in proved challenging as fatigue set in. QPR picked up important points against mid-table sides but suffered damaging defeats to playoff contenders. A frustrating 2–2 draw at home to Hull City on 19 April summed up the campaign — plenty of chances but costly errors at the back.

=== May ===
QPR's final game of the season was a 1–1 draw away at Blackburn Rovers on 3 May. The result confirmed a 15th-place finish with 58 points

== Transfers and contracts ==
=== In ===
Date	Pos.	No.	Player	From	Fee	Ref.
2 June 2025	CB	19	(Czech Republic) Timothy Akindileni	(Scotland) Aberdeen	Undisclosed	
27 June 2025	RB	2	(Australia) Kealey Adamson	(Australia) Macarthur	£260,000	
29 June 2025	RW	17	(Ghana) Kwame Poku	(England) Peterborough United	£900,000	
1 July 2025	AM	25	(Australia) Jaylan Pearman	(Australia) Perth Glory	Free transfer	
1 July 2025	GK	35	(England) Charlie Warren	(England) Tottenham Hotspur	Free transfer	
1 July 2025	CB	44	(England) Alex Wilkie	(England) Eastleigh	Free transfer	
1 July 2025	CM	–	(England) Kaleb Dyke	(England) Leicester City	Free transfer	
1 July 2025	CB	27	(Senegal) Amadou Mbengue	(England) Reading	Free transfer	
23 July 2025	CB	30	(South Africa) Tylon Smith	(South Africa) Stellenbosch	£300,000	
26 July 2025	CF	16	(Jamaica) Rumarn Burrell	(England) Burton Albion	£1,000,000	
13 August 2025	CF	22	(Ivory Coast) Richard Kone	(England) Wycombe Wanderers	£2,750,000	
25 August 2025	DM	15	(Jamaica) Isaac Hayden	(England) Newcastle United	Free transfer	
25 August 2025	LW	14	(Japan) Kōki Saitō	(Belgium) Lommel	£2,780,000	
1 September 2025	AM	32	(Sweden) Isak Alemayehu	(Sweden) Djurgårdens	£60,000	
19 September 2025	GK	29	(England) Ben Hamer	(England) Sheffield Wednesday	Free transfer	
9 January 2026	CB	37	(England) Ronnie Edwards	(England) Southampton	£4,500,000	
19 January 2026	CF	46	(Trinidad and Tobago) Justin Obikwu	(England) Coventry City	£500,000	
28 January 2026	CB	—	(Australia) Christian Pullella	(Australia) Perth Glory	Undisclosed	
▼ Spending: £13,050,000

=== Out ===
Date	Pos.	No.	Player	To	Fee	Ref.
30 June 2025	GK	41	(Wales) Nathan Shepperd	(Wales) The New Saints	Free transfer	
27 July 2025	CF	–	(United States) Charlie Kelman	(England) Charlton Athletic	£3,500,000	
2 September 2025	CDM	52	(Kosovo) Lorent Talla	(Portugal) Rio Ave	£3,500,000	
21 January 2026	CDM	—	(Iraq) Alexander Aoraha	(Iraq) Al-Zawraa	£3,500,000	
26 January 2026	CF	12	(Switzerland) Michael Frey	(Switzerland) Grasshopper Club Zurich	£3,500,000	

=== Loans in ===
Date	Pos.	Player	From	Date until	Ref.
25 August 2025	LB	(Wales) Rhys Norrington-Davies	(England) Sheffield United	31 May 2026	

=== Loans out ===
Date	Pos.	Player	To	Date until	Ref.
23 June 2025	GK	(England) Murphy Cooper	(England) Barnsley	14 January 2026 (Note: On 14 January, Cooper's initial season-long loan at Barnsley was terminated)	
11 July 2025	RB	(Brazil) Hevertton	(Portugal) Gil Vicente	31 May 2026	
17 July 2025	CF	(England) Rohan Vaughan	(Republic of Ireland) Dundalk	30 November 2025	
8 August 2025	CF	(England) Ridwan Hassan	(England) Hanwell Town	2 September 2025 (Note: On 2 September, Hassan was recalled from his loan at Hanwell)	
8 August 2025	CF	(England) Alfie Lloyd	(England) Leyton Orient	16 January 2026 (Note: On 16 January, Lloyd was recalled from his initial season-long loan at Leyton Orient)	
8 August 2025	CB	(Wales) Charlie Street	(England) Bracknell Town	3 October 2025	
16 August 2025	CB	(Scotland) Noah McCann	(England) Enfield Town	13 September 2025	
23 August 2025	CM	(England) Teddy Tarbotton	(England) Bracknell Town	17 October 2025 (Note: On 26 September, Tarbotton's loan at Bracknell was extended until January. However on, 17 October he was recalled)	
23 August 2025	CM	(Wales) Alfie Tuck	(England) Hampton & Richmond Borough	15 November 2025	
15 August 2025	CF	(Slovenia) Žan Celar	(Germany) Fortuna Düsseldorf	31 May 2026	
29 August 2025	RB	(Scotland) Rocco Friel	(Scotland) Queen's Park	3 January 2026	
6 September 2025	LB	(England) Cory Adjetey-Brew	(England) Welling United	4 October 2025	
9 September 2025	GK	(England) Joel Halliday	(England) Chertsey Town	7 October 2025	
16 September 2025	CM	(England) Elijah Dixon-Bonner	(England) Morecambe	2 January 2026	
17 September 2025	CF	(England) Emmerson Sutton	(England) Morecambe	14 January 2026	
26 September 2025	LB	(England) Jake Leahy	(England) Bracknell Town	2 January 2026	
26 September 2025	CB	(Scotland) Noah McCann	(England) Bracknell Town	3 January 2026 (Note: On 17 October, McCann's loan at Bracknell was extended until early January)	
2 October 2025	CF	(Republic of Ireland) Cian Dillon	(England) Torquay United	26 October 2025	
17 October 2025	CB	(Wales) Charlie Street	(England) Walton & Hersham	15 November 2025	
17 October 2025	CM	(England) Teddy Tarbotton	(England) Farnborough	3 January 2026	
24 October 2025	CB	(England) Gabriel Cuthbert	(England) Northwood	3 January 2026	
5 November 2025	CF	(Republic of Ireland) Cian Dillon	(England) Enfield Town	31 January 2026 (Note: On 3 December, Dillon's loan at Enfield was extended until the end of January)	
7 November 2025	CB	(England) Jack McDowell	(England) Bracknell Town	31 May 2026 (Note: On 5 December, McDowell's loan at Bracknell was extended until end of January. Then on 2 February it was extended further until the end of the season)	
8 November 2025	CB	(England) Alex Wilkie	(England) Hampton & Richmond Borough	20 December 2025 (Note: On 6 December, Wilkie's loan at Hampton & Richmond was extended until end of January, however two weeks later he was recalled)	
21 November 2025	GK	(England) Joel Halliday	(England) Basingstoke Town	19 December 2025	
6 December 2025	RB	(England) Jaiden Putman	(England) Bath City	7 March 2026 (Note: On 9 January, Putman's loan at Bath City was extended for a further month. Then again on 7 February)	
10 December 2025	CAM	(England) Archie O'Brien	(England) Hanwell Town	5 February 2026 (Note: On 8 January, O'Brien's loan at Hanwell Town was extended for another month)	
20 December 2025	CB	(Scotland) Noah McCann	(England) Tonbridge Angels	14 March 2026	
8 January 2026	RM	(England) Jake Coomes	(England) Bracknell Town	5 March 2026 (Note: On 5 February, Coomes' loan at Bracknell Town was extended by a month)	
10 January 2026	CM	(England) Elijah Dixon-Bonner	(England) Wealdstone	31 May 2026	
16 January 2026	CB	(Czech Republic) Timothy Akindileni	(England) Morecambe	31 May 2026	
16 January 2026	GK	(England) Murphy Cooper	(England) Sheffield Wednesday	31 May 2026	
19 January 2026	CF	(England) Alfie Lloyd	(England) Lincoln City	31 May 2026	
20 January 2026	CB	(Scotland) Liam Morrison	(Scotland) Aberdeen	31 May 2026	
23 January 2026	CF	(England) Emmerson Sutton	(England) Harrogate Town	31 May 2026	
2 February 2026	CDM	(England) Sam Field	(England) Norwich City	31 May 2026	
7 February 2026	GK	(England) Joel Halliday	(England) Flackwell Heath	7 March 2026	
13 February 2026	CF	(England) Rohan Vaughan	(England) Dartford	31 May 2026	
20 February 2026	LB	(England) Jake Leahy	(England) Hungerford Town	31 May 2026	
21 February 2026	CM	(Wales) Alfie Tuck	(England) Farnborough	31 May 2026	
6 March 2026	CB	(England) Gabriel Cuthbert	(England) Northwood	26 March 2026 (Note: On 26 March, Cuthbert was recalled from his loan at Northwood and subsequently joined Uxbridge on loan)	
26 March 2026	CB	(England) Gabriel Cuthbert	(England) Uxbridge	31 May 2026	
26 March 2026	CB	(England) Alex Wilkie	(England) Chippenham Town	31 May 2026	

=== Released or out of contract ===
Date	Pos.	Player	Subsequent club	Join date	Ref.
30 June 2025	CAM	(England) Kooshan Hayati	(England) Woking	1 July 2025	
30 June 2025	CB	(Republic of Ireland) Charlie O'Brien	(Wales) Cardiff City	3 July 2025	
30 June 2025	LB	(Suriname) Kenneth Paal	(Turkey) Antalyaspor	11 July 2025	
30 June 2025	LB	(Wales) Morgan Fox	(England) Wigan Athletic	2 August 2025	
30 June 2025	CAM	(England) Harry Murphy	(England) Bedford Town	8 August 2025	
30 June 2025	LB	(Slovakia) Casey Shann	(England) Wingate & Finchley	9 August 2025	
30 June 2025	RB	(England) Samuel Manufor	(United States) Charlotte 49ers	21 August 2025	
30 June 2025	CM	(Montenegro) Luka Radojevic	(Serbia) OFK Beograd	14 November 2025	
30 June 2025	CDM	(England) Jack Colback	(England) Anstey Nomads F.C.	13 February 2026	
30 June 2025	CAM	(Denmark) Lucas Andersen	(Thailand) BG Pathum United	3 April 2026	
30 June 2025	GK	(Republic of Ireland) Conor Clark			
30 June 2025	CAM	(England) Hassan Hamid	Rimal Al-Sahra SC	26 September 2025	
30 June 2025	GK	(England) La'Trell Jones			
30 June 2025	CB	(France) Kemoko Keita-Turay	Rimal Al-Sahra SC	1 July 2026	
30 June 2025	GK	(England) Callum Loades			
30 June 2025	CF	(England) Lorenzo Strachan	Kingstonian F.C.	10 November 2026	
1 September 2025	RW	(England) Kieran Petrie	(England) Wealdstone	22 November 2025	
1 September 2025	CM	(England) Taylor Richards	(England) Crawley Town	1 January 2026	

=== New contracts ===
Date	Pos.	No.	Player	Until	Ref.
4 June 2025	CB	41	(Scotland) Noah McCann	Undisclosed (Note: First professional contract.)	
5 June 2025	GK	–	(England) Joel Halliday	Undisclosed	
12 June 2025	GK	13	(England) Joe Walsh	Undisclosed	
13 June 2025	CDM	8	(England) Sam Field	Undisclosed	
18 June 2025	CB	3	(Republic of Ireland) Jimmy Dunne	Undisclosed	
23 June 2025	GK	–	(England) Murphy Cooper	Undisclosed	
30 June 2025	LB	38	(France) Ziyad Larkeche	Undisclosed	
18 August 2025	LW	23	(Australia) Daniel Bennie	Undisclosed	
2 September 2025	CB	4	(Scotland) Liam Morrison	Undisclosed	
22 September 2025	CF	12	(Switzerland) Michael Frey	Undisclosed	
31 December 2025	RW	11	(Northern Ireland) Paul Smyth	Undisclosed	
8 January 2026	GK	29	(England) Ben Hamer	Undisclosed	
29 January 2026	CM	39	(England) Teddy Tarbotton	Undisclosed	

== Pre-season and friendlies ==
On 22 May 2025, Queens Park Rangers announced a ten-day training camp in Girona and their first pre-season friendly against Toulouse. Four weeks later, a second friendly was confirmed against Heerenveen, and a third friendly was confirmed against Brentford on the next day, 17 June 2025. Three days later, the completed pre-season schedule was released with the additions of behind-closed-doors matches against Stevenage, Castellón and Cardiff City.

Win Draw Loss Fixtures

5 July 2025 Friendly	Queens Park Rangers	5–0	Stevenage	Hounslow, England
12:00 BST	Dembélé 15', 35'; Chair 30'; Richards 32'; Vale 80'	Report		Stadium: TSG Training Centre; Attendance: 0 (behind closed doors)

12 July 2025 Friendly	Castellón	6–0	Queens Park Rangers	Torremolinos, Spain
11:00 CEST	Serpeta 13'; Bosilj 33'; Trialist 37' (o.g.); Cipenga 41'; Markanich 54', 82'	Report	Trialist (yellow card) 75'	Stadium: Torremolinos Sports Centre; Attendance: 0 (behind closed doors)
Note: Fixture was originally scheduled for a 12:00 kick-off, but was moved due to adverse weather anticipated in the area.

18 July 2025 Friendly	Toulouse	1–2	Queens Park Rangers	Canet-en-Roussillon, France
18:00 CEST	Cásseres 9'	Report	Smyth 37'; Celar 45' (pen.)	Stadium: Stade Saint-Michel

23 July 2025 Friendly	Queens Park Rangers	2–2	Cardiff City	Hounslow, England
14:00 BST	Dembélé 35'; Pearman 72'	Report	Robinson 8'; Colwill 15'	Stadium: TSG Training Centre; Attendance: 0 (behind closed doors)

26 July 2025 Friendly	Queens Park Rangers	2–2	Heerenveen	Shepherd's Bush, England
15:00 BST	Dembélé 31'; Bennie 55'	Report	Vente 54'; Smans 72'	Stadium: Loftus Road

2 August 2025 Friendly	Queens Park Rangers	0–1	Brentford	Shepherd's Bush, England
15:00 BST		Report	Collins 2'	Stadium: Loftus Road

== Competitions ==
=== Overall record ===
Competition	First match	Last match	Starting round	Final position	Record							
Competition	First match	Last match	Starting round	Final position	Pld	W	D	L	GF	GA	GD	Win %
EFL Championship	9 August 2025	2 May 2026	Matchday 1	TBD	46	16	10	20	61	73	−12	34.78
FA Cup	11 January 2026		Third round	Third round	1	0	0	1	1	2	−1	0.00
EFL Cup	12 August 2025		First round	First round	1	0	0	1	2	3	−1	0.00
Total					48	16	10	22	64	78	−14	33.33

Last updated: 2 May 2026
Source: Soccerway

=== EFL Championship ===
==== League table ====
Pos	Team	Pld	W	D	L	GF	GA	GD	Pts
13	Sheffield United	46	18	6	22	66	66	0	60
14	Preston North End	46	15	15	16	55	62	−7	60
15	Queens Park Rangers	46	16	10	20	61	73	−12	58
16	Watford	46	14	15	17	53	65	−12	57
17	Stoke City	46	15	10	21	51	56	−5	55

Source: EFL Official Website
Rules for classification: 1) Points; 2) Goal difference; 3) Number of goals scored; 4) Head-to-head results; 5) Wins; 6) Away goals; 7) Penalty points (sec 9.5); 8) Number of 12-point sending off offences; 9) Play-off (only if needed to determine promotion/relegation)

==== Results summary ====
Overall								Home						Away					
Pld	W	D	L	GF	GA	GD	Pts	W	D	L	GF	GA	GD	W	D	L	GF	GA	GD
46	16	10	20	61	73	−12	58	10	3	10	40	37	+3	6	7	10	21	36	−15

Last updated: 2 May 2026.
Source: Soccerway

==== Results by round ====
Round	1	2	3	4	5	6	7	8	9	10	11	12	13	14	15	16	17	18	19	20	21	22	23	24	25	26	27	28	29	30	31	32	33	34	35	36	37	38	39	40	41	42	43	44	45	46
Ground	H	A	A	H	A	H	A	H	A	H	A	A	H	H	A	H	A	A	H	H	A	H	A	A	H	H	A	A	H	H	A	H	A	A	H	H	A	A	H	H	A	H	A	H	H	A
Result	D	L	L	W	W	W	D	D	W	L	W	L	L	L	D	W	W	L	W	W	L	W	D	L	L	W	D	D	L	W	D	L	W	L	L	L	L	W	W	W	D	D	L	L	L	L
Position	13	18	22	18	12	9	9	10	6	11	8	9	13	16	16	15	12	13	10	7	9	7	9	9	12	11	11	12	12	11	12	13	13	14	15	16	18	16	12	10	12	11	11	12	14	15
Points	1	1	1	4	7	10	11	12	15	15	18	18	18	18	19	22	25	25	28	31	31	34	35	35	35	38	39	40	40	43	44	44	47	47	47	47	47	50	53	56	57	58	58	58	58	58

Source: EFL
A = Away; H = Home; W = Win; D = Draw; L = Loss; P = Postponed

==== Matches ====
The league fixtures were released on 26 June 2025.

Win Draw Loss Fixtures

9 August 2025 1	Queens Park Rangers	1–1	Preston North End	Shepherd's Bush
15:00 BST	Whiteman 41' (o.g.)	Report	Osmajić 48'; Hughes (yellow card) 71'; Whiteman (yellow card) 84'; Lindsay (yellow card) 86'	Stadium: Loftus Road; Attendance: 16,804; Referee: Oliver Langford

16 August 2025 2	Watford	2–1	Queens Park Rangers	Watford
15:00 BST	Kjerrumgaard 19', 23'; Kayembe (yellow card) 65'; Louza (red card) 90+3'	Report	Mbengue (yellow card) 40'; Morgan 45+4'; Dembélé (yellow card) 79'	Stadium: Vicarage Road; Attendance: 19,517; Referee: Tony Harrington

23 August 2025 3	Coventry City	7–1	Queens Park Rangers	Coventry
15:00 BST	Wright 12', 37'; Thomas-Asante 23'; Rudoni 35', 43'; Torp 47', 66'; Kitching (yellow card) 90'	Report	Dunne (yellow card) 28'; Mbengue (yellow card) 75'; Kone 90+1'	Stadium: Coventry Building Society Arena; Attendance: 29,015; Referee: Adam Herczeg

30 August 2025 4	Queens Park Rangers	3–1	Charlton Athletic	Shepherd's Bush
12:30 BST	Smyth 8'; Morrison (yellow card) 38'; Mbengue (yellow card) 65'; Saitō 84'; Kone 90+7'	Report	Coventry (yellow card) 17'; Apter 54'; Edwards (yellow card) 78'	Stadium: Loftus Road; Attendance: 16,875; Referee: Andrew Kitchen
Note: Fixture was initially scheduled for a 15:00 kick-off, but was moved for live Sky Sports broadcast.

13 September 2025 5	Wrexham	1–3	Queens Park Rangers	Wrexham
15:00 BST	Moore 67'; Dobson (yellow card) 82'	Report	Coady 33' (o.g.); Kone 44'; Burrell 75'	Stadium: Racecourse Ground; Attendance: 10,608; Referee: Ben Speedie

20 September 2025 6	Queens Park Rangers	1–0	Stoke City	Shepherd's Bush
12:30 BST	Norrington-Davies (yellow card) 42'; Hayden (yellow card) 64'; Mbengue (yellow card) 67'; Burrell (yellow card) 72'; Vale 75'; Nardi (yellow card) 90+3'	Report	Pearson (yellow card) 39'; Baker (yellow card) 52'; Lawal (yellow card) 88'	Stadium: Loftus Road; Attendance: 16,481; Referee: Tim Robinson
Note: Fixture was initially scheduled for a 15:00 kick-off, but was moved for live Sky Sports broadcast.

27 September 2025 7	Sheffield Wednesday	1–1	Queens Park Rangers	Sheffield
15:00 BST	Iorfa 30'; Bannan (yellow card) 54'; Ingelsson (yellow card) 85'	Report	Morrison (yellow card) 23'; Madsen 48' (pen.); Dembélé (yellow card) 88'	Stadium: Hillsborough Stadium; Attendance: 20,132; Referee: John Brooks

1 October 2025 8	Queens Park Rangers	0–0	Oxford United	Shepherd's Bush
20:00 BST	Mbengue (yellow card) 74'; Burrell (yellow card) 87'; Norrington-Davies (yellow card) 90+3'	Report	L. Harris (yellow card) 85'	Stadium: Loftus Road; Attendance: 15,470; Referee: Ruebyn Ricardo
Note: Fixture was initially scheduled for a 19:45 kick-off, but was moved for live Sky Sports broadcast.

4 October 2025 9	Bristol City	1–2	Queens Park Rangers	Bristol
15:00 BST	Sykes (yellow card) 29'; Riis 32'; Mehmeti (yellow card) 48'; Vyner (yellow card) 73'; Atkinson (yellow card) 89'; Hirakawa (yellow card) 90+5'	Report	Kone (yellow card) 51', (goal) 66'; Smyth 84'	Stadium: Ashton Gate; Attendance: 24,200; Referee: Edward Duckworth

18 October 2025 10	Queens Park Rangers	1–2	Millwall	Shepherd's Bush
12:30 BST	Norrington-Davies (yellow card) 55'; Smyth (yellow card) 59'; Burrell 85'	Report	Leonard (yellow card) 33'; Azeez 36'; Cooper (yellow card) 39'; Ivanović 45+4'; Ballo (yellow card) 56'; Doughty (yellow card) 90+5'	Stadium: Loftus Road; Attendance: 17,408; Referee: Adam Herczeg
Note: Fixture was initially scheduled for a 15:00 kick-off, but was moved for live Sky Sports broadcast.

22 October 2025 11	Swansea City	0–1	Queens Park Rangers	Swansea
19:45 BST	Yalcouyé (red card) 34'; Idah (yellow card) 41'; Cullen (yellow card) 90+3'	Report	Burrell 18'; Dunne (yellow card) 29'; Cook (yellow card) 35'; Kone (yellow card) 87'; Chair (yellow card) 90+2'	Stadium: Swansea.com Stadium; Attendance: 14,254; Referee: John Busby

25 October 2025 12	Derby County	1–0	Queens Park Rangers	Derby
15:00 BST	Morris 10', (yellow card) 90+3'; Ozoh (yellow card) 75'	Report	Varane (yellow card) 69'; Cook (yellow card) 71'	Stadium: Pride Park Stadium; Attendance: 28,931; Referee: Elliot Bell

1 November 2025 13	Queens Park Rangers	1–4	Ipswich Town	Shepherd's Bush
15:00 GMT	Burrell 21'; Vale (yellow card) 32'; Morrison (yellow card) 63'; Mbengue (yellow card) 90'; Hayden (yellow card) 90+4'	Report	Hirst 2', 57'; Núñez 47', 64'	Stadium: Loftus Road; Attendance: 17,505; Referee: Sam Allison

5 November 2025 14	Queens Park Rangers	1–2	Southampton	Shepherd's Bush
19:45 GMT	Madsen (yellow card) 38'; Burrell 73'	Report	Robinson 55'; Scienza 69'; Jander (yellow card) 79'; Downes (yellow card) 81'; Wood (yellow card) 82'	Stadium: Loftus Road; Attendance: 16,404; Referee: James Bell

8 November 2025 15	Sheffield United	0–0	Queens Park Rangers	Sheffield
15:00 GMT		Report	Mbengue (yellow card) 45+2'; Varane (yellow card) 63'	Stadium: Bramall Lane; Attendance: 26,529; Referee: Lewis Smith

22 November 2025 16	Queens Park Rangers	3–2	Hull City	Shepherd's Bush
15:00 GMT	Chair 38'; Dunne 55'; Burrell 66'	Report	Gelhardt 17'; Destan 51'; Crooks (yellow card) 90+2'	Stadium: Loftus Road; Attendance: 16,657; Referee: James Linington

26 November 2025 17	Blackburn Rovers	0–1	Queens Park Rangers	Blackburn
19:45 GMT	McLoughlin (yellow card) 22'; Hedges (yellow card) 37'; Ōhashi (yellow card) 90+1'	Report	Smyth 78'	Stadium: Ewood Park; Attendance: 11,122; Referee: Adam Herczeg

29 November 2025 18	Norwich City	3–1	Queens Park Rangers	Norwich
15:00 GMT	Marcondes 9'; Mbengue 33' (o.g.); Amankwah 36'; McLean (yellow card) 76'; Duffy (yellow card) 80'	Report	Burrell 11', (yellow card) 57'; Smyth (yellow card) 86'	Stadium: Carrow Road; Attendance: 25,571; Referee: Lewis Smith

6 December 2025 19	Queens Park Rangers	3–1	West Bromwich Albion	Shepherd's Bush
15:00 GMT	Varane 45+4'; Burrell 59', 87'; Norrington-Davies (yellow card) 90+4'	Report	Grant (yellow card) 39'; Heggebø 76'	Stadium: Loftus Road; Attendance: 16,745; Referee: Gavin Ward

9 December 2025 20	Queens Park Rangers	2–1	Birmingham City	Shepherd's Bush
20:00 GMT	Dunne 40'; Morgan 90+6', (yellow card) 90+7'; Mbengue (yellow card) 90+7'	Report	Paik Seung-ho (yellow card) 80'; Roberts 90+3'; Furuhashi (yellow card) 90+8'	Stadium: Loftus Road; Attendance: 14,947; Referee: James Bell
Note: Fixture was initially scheduled for a 19:45 kick-off, but was moved for live Sky Sports broadcast.

13 December 2025 21	Middlesbrough	3–1	Queens Park Rangers	Middlesbrough
15:00 GMT	Strelec 30'; McGree (yellow card) 32'; Whittaker 36'; Conway 50' (pen.)	Report	Madsen 70' (pen.)	Stadium: Riverside Stadium; Attendance: 24,055; Referee: David Webb

20 December 2025 22	Queens Park Rangers	4–1	Leicester City	Shepherd's Bush
15:00 GMT	Saitō 2'; Kone 29'; Dembélé 33'; Mbengue 45+3'; Norrington-Davies (yellow card) 90+4'	Report	Ayew (yellow card) 35'; Pereira (yellow card) 77'; De Cordova-Reid (penalty missed) 82'; S. Thomas 82'	Stadium: Loftus Road; Attendance: 17,500; Referee: Tom Nield

26 December 2025 23	Portsmouth	1–1	Queens Park Rangers	Portsmouth
15:00 GMT	Devlin 45'; Segečić (yellow card) 62'	Report	Dunne 61'; Hayden (yellow card) 87'; Norrington-Davies (yellow card) 88'	Stadium: Fratton Park; Attendance: 20,449; Referee: James Linington

29 December 2025 24	West Bromwich Albion	2–1	Queens Park Rangers	West Bromwich
19:45 GMT	Campbell 24'; Phillips 55'	Report	Diakité 35' (o.g.); Dunne (yellow card) 37'; Morgan (yellow card) 42'	Stadium: The Hawthorns; Attendance: 23,485; Referee: Lewis Smith

1 January 2026 25	Queens Park Rangers	1–2	Norwich City	Shepherd's Bush
15:00 GMT	Mbengue 90+9'	Report	Chrisene (yellow card) 45+1'; Sargent 46'; Kovačević (yellow card) 72'; Stacey (yellow card) 82'; Makama 90+6'	Stadium: Loftus Road; Attendance: 17,452; Referee: Dean Whitestone

4 January 2026 26	Queens Park Rangers	3–0	Sheffield Wednesday	Shepherd's Bush
12:00 GMT	Burrell 14'; Kolli 81', 88'	Report		Stadium: Loftus Road; Attendance: 16,327; Referee: Sam Allison
Note: Fixture was initially scheduled for a 15:00 kick-off, but was moved for live Sky Sports broadcast.

17 January 2026 27	Stoke City	0–0	Queens Park Rangers	Stoke-on-Trent
15:00 GMT	Pearson (yellow card) 29'; Mubama (yellow card) 37'; Cissé (yellow card) 45+4'	Report	Mbengue (yellow card) 29'; Dunne (yellow card) 50'; Kone (yellow card) 78'; Bennie (yellow card) 90+10'	Stadium: Bet365 Stadium; Attendance: 22,045; Referee: Matt Donohue

20 January 2026 28	Oxford United	0–0	Queens Park Rangers	Oxford
19:45 GMT	Vaulks (yellow card) 58'	Report	Dembélé (yellow card) 55'; Smyth (yellow card) 58'	Stadium: Kassam Stadium; Attendance: 10,478; Referee: Will Finnie

24 January 2026 29	Queens Park Rangers	2–3	Wrexham	Shepherd's Bush
15:00 GMT	Vale 6'; Mbengue (yellow card) 44' (yellow-red card) 90'; Smyth (yellow card) 61'; Cook 80'	Report	Scarr (yellow card) 12'; Doyle 54'; Sheaf (yellow card) 56'; Windass 90+3'; Rathbone 90+4'; Smith (yellow card) 90+5'	Stadium: Loftus Road; Attendance: 17,502; Referee: Oliver Langford

31 January 2026 30	Queens Park Rangers	2–1	Coventry City	Shepherd's Bush
15:00 GMT	Kone (yellow card) 25', (goal) 66'; Norrington-Davies (yellow card) 62'; Madsen 73'	Report	Eccles 53'; Kitching (yellow card) 90+2'; Thomas (yellow card) 90+5'	Stadium: Loftus Road; Attendance: 17,321; Referee: Josh Smith

6 February 2026 31	Charlton Athletic	0–0	Queens Park Rangers	Charlton
20:01 GMT	Chambers (yellow card) 47'; Clarke (yellow card) 90+6'	Report	Vale (yellow card) 4'	Stadium: The Valley; Attendance: 21,290; Referee: Tom Nield
Note: Fixture was initially scheduled for 7 February, but was moved to 20:00 for live Sky Sports broadcast, and later postponed by one minute for the Every Minute Matters campaign.

14 February 2026 32	Queens Park Rangers	1–3	Blackburn Rovers	Shepherd's Bush
15:00 GMT	Saitō 35'; Hayden (yellow card) 38'; Vale (yellow card) 78'	Report	Jørgensen 21', 39'; McLouglin (yellow card) 36'; Morishita 50', (yellow card) 84'; Cashin (yellow card) 90+1'	Stadium: Loftus Road; Attendance: 16,607; Referee: Stephen Martin

21 February 2026 33	Hull City	1–3	Queens Park Rangers	Kingston upon Hull
12:30 GMT	Slater (yellow card) 37'; Gelhardt 39'; Millar (yellow card) 44'; McNair (yellow card) 74'	Report	McNair 21' (o.g.); Edwards (yellow card) 45+1'; Bennie 84'; Kone 90+5'	Stadium: MKM Stadium; Attendance: 21,928; Referee: Andrew Madley
Note: Fixture was initially scheduled for a 15:00 kick-off, but was moved for live Sky Sports broadcast.

24 February 2026 34	Southampton	5–0	Queens Park Rangers	Southampton
20:00 GMT	Azaz 9'; Jander (yellow card) 16'; Matsuki 45+2', 50'; Scienza 59'; Bree 70'	Report		Stadium: St Mary's Stadium; Attendance: 26,422; Referee: Oliver Langford
Note: Fixture was initially scheduled for a 19:45 kick-off, but was moved for live Sky Sports broadcast.

28 February 2026 35	Queens Park Rangers	0–2	Sheffield United	Shepherd's Bush
15:00 GMT	Smyth (yellow card) 80'; Morgan (yellow card) 90+3'	Report	O'Hare 13'; Campbell 33'; Hamer (yellow card) 79'; Brooks (yellow card) 90+2'	Stadium: Loftus Road; Attendance: 17,376; Referee: Tom Nield

8 March 2026 36	Queens Park Rangers	0–4	Middlesbrough	Shepherd's Bush
16:30 GMT		Report	Strelec 20'; Browne 68'; Hackney 72'; Conway 88' (pen.)	Stadium: Loftus Road; Attendance: 15,940; Referee: Josh Smith
Note: Fixture was initially scheduled for 7 March, but was moved for live Sky Sports broadcast.

11 March 2026 37	Birmingham City	1–0	Queens Park Rangers	Birmingham
19:45 GMT	Roberts 6'; Osman (yellow card) 24'; Laird (yellow card) 45'; Beadle (yellow card) 81'; Gray (yellow card) 90+7'	Report		Stadium: St Andrew's; Attendance: 25,212; Referee: Anthony Backhouse
Note: Fixture was initially scheduled for 10 March, but was moved due to QPR playing on the preceding Sunday.

14 March 2026 38	Leicester City	1–3	Queens Park Rangers	Leicester
15:00 GMT	James 14'; Nelson (yellow card) 25'	Report	Kone (yellow card) 28'; Vale 43'; Nelson 50' (o.g.); Edwards 58'; Dunne (yellow card) 79'; Varane (yellow card) 83'	Stadium: King Power Stadium; Attendance: 27,494; Referee: Dean Whitestone

21 March 2026 39	Queens Park Rangers	6–1	Portsmouth	Shepherd's Bush
15:00 GMT	Smyth 7', 29', (yellow card) 22'; Kolli 24', 55'; Hayden (yellow card) 32'; Norrington-Davies (yellow card) 73'; Kone 86' (pen.), 87', (yellow card) 90+4'	Report	Adams (yellow card) 32'; Swift 38'; Devlin (yellow card) 90+2'	Stadium: Loftus Road; Attendance: 16,962; Referee: John Busby

3 April 2026 40	Queens Park Rangers	2–1	Watford	Shepherd's Bush
15:00 BST	Kolli 26', (yellow card) 29'; Dunne (yellow card) 30'; Smyth (yellow card) 61', (goal) 63'; Kone (yellow card) 84'; Mbengue (yellow card) 87'; Poku (yellow card) 90+1'	Report	Bove (yellow card) 23'; Ekwah (yellow card) 49'; Goglichidze (yellow card) 62'; Louza 85', (yellow card) 90+1'	Stadium: Loftus Road; Attendance: 17,532; Referee: Ruebyn Ricardo

6 April 2026 41	Preston North End	1–1	Queens Park Rangers	Preston
15:00 BST	Potts 46'; Gibson (yellow card) 76'	Report	Varane (yellow card) 13'; Morgan (yellow card) 65'; Small 82' (o.g.); Clarke-Salter (yellow card) 90+1'	Stadium: Deepdale; Attendance: 15,046; Referee: Thomas Kirk

11 April 2026 42	Queens Park Rangers	0–0	Bristol City	Shepherd's Bush
12:30 BST	Varane (yellow card) 27'; Mbengue (yellow card) 55'; Bennie (yellow card) 75'; Norrington-Davies (yellow card) 85'	Report	Eile (yellow card) 66'; Burgzorg (yellow card) 89'	Stadium: Loftus Road; Attendance: 16,745; Referee: Edward Duckworth
Note: Fixture was initially scheduled for a 15:00 kick-off, but was moved for live Sky Sports broadcast.

18 April 2026 43	Millwall	2–0	Queens Park Rangers	Bermondsey
12:30 BST	Mazou-Sacko 3'; Neghli 17'; Azeez (yellow card) 34'	Report	Edwards (yellow card) 19'; Mbengue (yellow card) 30'; Hayden (yellow card) 90+2'	Stadium: The Den; Attendance: 18,934; Referee: Tom Nield
Note: Fixture was initially scheduled for a 15:00 kick-off, but was moved for live Sky Sports broadcast.

21 April 2026 44	Queens Park Rangers	1–2	Swansea City	Shepherd's Bush
19:45 BST	Morgan (yellow card) 23'; Adamson (yellow card) 55'; Norrington-Davies (yellow card) 60', (goal) 90'	Report	Ronald 2', (yellow card) 90+2'; Vipotnik 80' (pen.)	Stadium: Loftus Road; Attendance: 13,835; Referee: Leigh Doughty

26 April 2026 45	Queens Park Rangers	2–3	Derby County	Shepherd's Bush
15:00 BST	Vale 13'; Kone 55'; Burrell (yellow card) 70'	Report	Fraulo 25'; Szmodics (yellow card) 53'; Langås (yellow card) 63', (goal) 76'; Brereton Díaz (yellow card) 81'; Banel 88'	Stadium: Loftus Road; Attendance: 17,131; Referee: John Busby

2 May 2026 46	Ipswich Town	3–0	Queens Park Rangers	Ipswich
12:30 BST	Hirst 3'; Philogene 9'; Furlong (yellow card) 46'; Davis (yellow card) 76'; McAteer 85'	Report	Smyth (yellow card) 79'	Stadium: Portman Road; Attendance: 29,636; Referee: Gavin Ward

=== FA Cup ===
As a Championship side, QPR entered the FA Cup in the third round, and were drawn away to Premier League club West Ham United.

Win Draw Loss Fixtures

11 January 2026 Third round	West Ham United	2–1 (a.e.t.)	Queens Park Rangers	Stratford
14:30 GMT	Summerville 45+10'; Castellanos (yellow card) 51', (goal) 98'; Magassa (yellow card) 57'; Wan-Bissaka (yellow card) 59'	Report	Mbengue (yellow card) 54'; Kone 65', (yellow card) 69'; Kolli (yellow card) 75'; Smyth (yellow card) 118'	Stadium: London Stadium; Attendance: 58,669; Referee: Thomas Kirk

=== EFL Cup ===
As a Championship side, QPR entered the EFL Cup in the first round, and were drawn away to League One side Plymouth Argyle.

Win Draw Loss Fixtures

12 August 2025 First round	Plymouth Argyle	3–2	Queens Park Rangers	Plymouth
19:45 BST	Paterson (penalty missed) 26'; Sarpong-Wiredu 48'; Oseni 54', 78'	Report	Bennie 21'; Sutton (yellow card) 38'; Kolli 45+2'	Stadium: Home Park; Attendance: 10,884; Referee: John Busby

== Statistics ==
=== Appearances ===
As of match played 3 May 2026

Players with no appearances are not included on the list, italics indicate a loaned in player

No.	Pos	Nat	Player	Total		Championship		FA Cup		EFL Cup	
No.	Pos	Nat	Player	Apps	Goals	Apps	Goals	Apps	Goals	Apps	Goals
1	GK	(France) FRA	Paul Nardi	18	0	16+1	0	0+0	0	1+0	0
2	DF	(Australia) AUS	Kealey Adamson	8	0	1+6	0	0+1	0	0+0	0
3	DF	(Republic of Ireland) IRL	Jimmy Dunne	40	3	39+0	3	1+0	0	0+0	0
5	DF	(England) ENG	Steve Cook	31	1	23+7	1	1+0	0	0+0	0
6	DF	(England) ENG	Jake Clarke-Salter	14	0	10+4	0	0+0	0	0+0	0
7	MF	(England) ENG	Karamoko Dembélé	29	1	17+11	1	1+0	0	0+0	0
10	MF	(Morocco) MAR	Ilias Chair	15	1	10+5	1	0+0	0	0+0	0
11	FW	(Northern Ireland) NIR	Paul Smyth	37	6	21+15	6	0+1	0	0+0	0
13	GK	(England) ENG	Joe Walsh	24	0	23+0	0	1+0	0	0+0	0
14	MF	(Japan) JPN	Kōki Saitō	34	3	22+11	3	1+0	0	0+0	0
15	MF	(Jamaica) JAM	Issac Hayden	30	0	15+14	0	1+0	0	0+0	0
16	FW	(Jamaica) JAM	Rumarn Burrell	31	10	22+8	10	0+0	0	1+0	0
17	MF	(Ghana) GHA	Kwame Poku	16	0	5+11	0	0+0	0	0+0	0
18	DF	(Wales) WAL	Rhys Norrington-Davies	40	1	34+5	1	1+0	0	0+0	0
20	MF	(Republic of Ireland) IRL	Harvey Vale	32	4	26+5	4	0+0	0	1+0	0
21	MF	(England) ENG	Kieran Morgan	29	2	15+13	2	0+1	0	0+0	0
22	FW	(Ivory Coast) CIV	Richard Kone	44	11	38+5	10	1+0	1	0+0	0
23	MF	(Australia) AUS	Daniel Bennie	19	2	5+12	1	0+1	0	1+0	1
24	MF	(Denmark) DEN	Nicolas Madsen	39	3	33+5	3	1+0	0	0+0	0
25	DF	(Australia) AUS	Jaylan Pearman	1	0	0+0	0	0+0	0	1+0	0
26	FW	(Algeria) ALG	Rayan Kolli	25	6	10+13	5	1+0	0	1+0	1
27	DF	(Senegal) SEN	Amadou Mbengue	42	2	36+5	2	1+0	0	0+0	0
28	DF	(Brazil) BRA	Esquerdinha	16	0	7+9	0	0+0	0	0+0	0
29	GK	(England) ENG	Ben Hamer	7	0	7+0	0	0+0	0	0+0	0
30	DF	(South Africa) RSA	Tylon Smith	4	0	0+3	0	0+0	0	1+0	0
34	MF	(England) ENG	Elijah Dixon-Bonner	1	0	0+0	0	0+0	0	1+0	0
36	MF	(England) ENG	Emmerson Sutton	1	0	0+0	0	0+0	0	1+0	0
37	DF	(England) ENG	Ronnie Edwards	17	1	17+0	1	0+0	0	0+0	0
39	MF	(England) ENG	Teddy Tarbotton	1	0	0+0	0	0+0	0	0+1	0
40	MF	(Martinique) MTQ	Jonathan Varane	36	1	29+7	1	0+0	0	0+0	0
42	FW	(Republic of Ireland) IRL	Cian Dillon	1	0	0+0	0	0+0	0	0+1	0
43	DF	(England) ENG	Jaiden Putman	1	0	0+0	0	0+0	0	1+0	0
44	DF	(England) ENG	Alex Wilkie	1	0	0+0	0	0+0	0	1+0	0
48	MF	(Sweden) SWE	Isak Alemayehu	1	0	0+1	0	0+0	0	0	0
50	MF	(Bermuda) BER	Kalen Brunson	1	0	0+0	0	0+0	0	0+1	0
52	MF	(Wales) WAL	Leon Scarlett	1	0	0+1	0	0+0	0	0	0
55	MF	(Colombia) COL	Ashley Trujillo	1	0	0+0	0	0+0	0	0+1	0
Players who featured but departed the club during the season:
4	DF	(Scotland) SCO	Liam Morrison	12	0	12+0	0	0+0	0	0+0	0
8	MF	(England) ENG	Sam Field	19	0	9+9	0	0+1	0	0+0	0
9	FW	(Slovenia) SLO	Žan Celar	2	0	1+1	0	0+0	0	0+0	0
12	FW	(Switzerland) SUI	Michael Frey	13	0	2+11	0	0+0	0	0+0	0
52	MF	(Kosovo) KOS	Lorent Talla	1	0	0+0	0	0+0	0	0+1	0

=== Goals ===
As of match played 3 May 2026

Rank	Player	Pos.	Championship	FA Cup	EFL Cup	Total
1	(Ivory Coast) Richard Kone	FW	10	1	0	11
2	(Jamaica) Rumarn Burrell	FW	10	0	0	10
3	(Northern Ireland) Paul Smyth	FW	6	0	0	6
3	(Algeria) Rayan Kolli	FW	5	0	1	6
5	(Republic of Ireland) Harvey Vale	MF	4	0	0	4
6	(Japan) Kōki Saitō	MF	3	0	0	3
6	(Denmark) Nicolas Madsen	MF	3	0	0	3
6	(Republic of Ireland) Jimmy Dunne	DF	3	0	0	3
9	(Senegal) Amadou Mbengue	DF	2	0	0	2
9	(England) Kieran Morgan	MF	2	0	0	2
9	(Australia) Daniel Bennie	MF	1	0	1	2
12	(Martinique) Jonathan Varane	MF	1	0	0	1
12	(Morocco) Ilias Chair	MF	1	0	0	1
12	(England) Steve Cook	DF	1	0	0	1
12	(England) Ronnie Edwards	DF	1	0	0	1
12	(Wales) Rhys Norrington-Davies	DF	1	0	0	1
12	(Scotland) Karamoko Dembélé	MF	1	0	0	1
Own goal			6	0	0	6
Total			61	1	2	64

=== Clean sheets ===
As of match played 3 May 2026

Rank	Player	Pos.	Championship	FA Cup	EFL Cup	Total
1	(France) Paul Nardi	GK	4	0	0	4
1	(England) Joe Walsh	GK	4	0	0	4
3	(England) Ben Hamer	GK	2	0	0	2
Total			10	0	0	10
