= Richard Kone =

Ivorian footballer

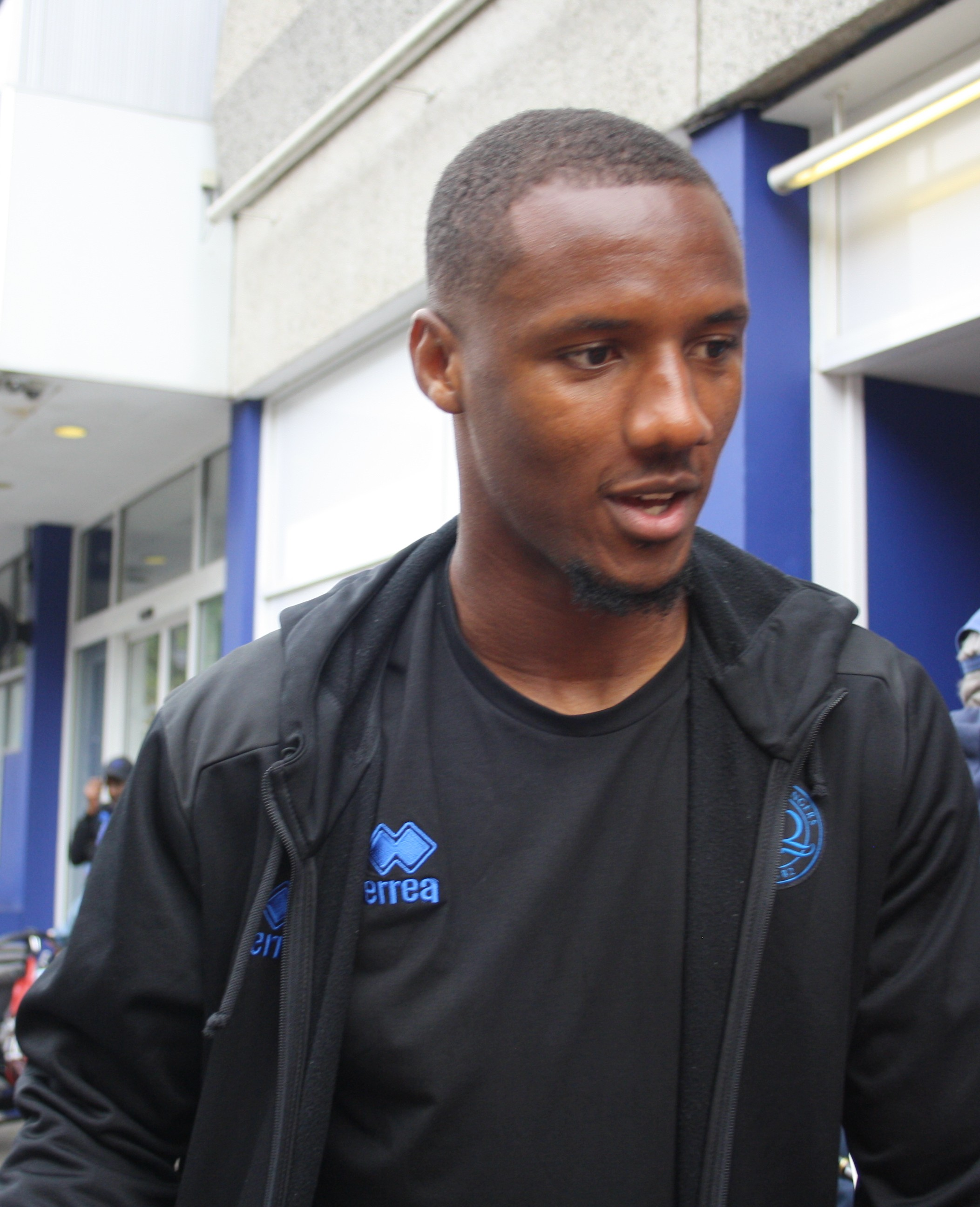
- Richard Kone in 2025.

Personal information
- Full name: Richard Kone
- Date of birth: 15 July 2003 (age 23)
- Place of birth: Abidjan, Ivory Coast
- Height: 1.85 m (6 ft 1 in)
- Position: Striker

Team information
- Current team: Queens Park Rangers
- Number: 22

Senior career*
Years	Team	Apps	(Gls)
2019–2024	Athletic Newham (Note: "Lopes Tavares" until the 2020–21 season when the club changed its name to Athletic Newham)	109	(88)
2024–2025	Wycombe Wanderers	61	(21)
2025–	Queens Park Rangers	53	(13)

International career^{‡}
2025–	Ivory Coast	1	(0)
- * Club domestic league appearances and goals as of 17:57, 24 October 2026 (UTC) ‡ National team caps and goals as of 18:31, 18 November 2025 (UTC)

Richard Kone (born 15 July 2003) is an Ivorian professional footballer who plays as a striker for EFL Championship club Queens Park Rangers and the Ivory Coast national team.

== Club career ==
=== Lopes Tavares/Athletic Newham ===
In 2019, after arriving in the United Kingdom to play in the Homeless World Cup, Kone began playing for Lopes Tavares, later to be renamed Athletic Newham, scoring 20 goals in 31 appearances in all competitions for the club in his first season at the club. In 2021, Athletic Newham were promoted to the Essex Senior League. During the club's first season in the league, Kone scored 42 goals in 48 games in all competitions, finishing as the league's top scorer with 31 goals. That season, he had trials with Colchester United as well as with a Premier League club. The following season, Kone scored 40 goals in all competitions. Despite the interest from teams in higher tiers, Kone's visa status prevented him from playing professional football.

He was also part of the Athletic Newham team which reached the FA Vase fourth round for the first time before Athletic Newham were disqualified for fielding an ineligible player against the eventual runners-up Littlehampton Town.

=== Wycombe Wanderers ===
After scoring a further 21 goals for Newham from the start of the 2023–24 season, Kone joined Wycombe Wanderers in January 2024 on a permanent contract, after an extended trial. He had started his trial with Wycombe in the summer of 2023, and scored in friendly matches against Aldershot Town and Barnet. He made a goalscoring debut for Wycombe Wanderers on 9 January 2024, in the EFL Trophy quarter finals against West Ham United's under-21's, scoring the second goal in a 2–1 victory. Later that month, Kone made his league debut against Lincoln City and scored his first league goal against Fleetwood Town.

In his first full season in the EFL, Kone came off the bench to score a perfect hat-trick against Peterborough United in nine minutes in a 3–1 win, this being Wycombe's fastest hat-trick in the EFL, beating Craig Mackail-Smith's 11 minute hat-trick against Crawley Town in 2017, also the first hattrick since Wycombe beat Lincoln City 3–1, where Joe Jacobson scored 2 direct corner goals as well as a Free Kick in 2019. He signed a contract extension with the club in November 2024. Following the departure of manager Matt Bloomfield to Luton Town, Kone was reportedly subject of a £6 million bid from the Championship club in the January transfer window, which Wycombe rejected. On 27 April 2025, he was named EFL League One Player of the Season and Young Player of the Season.

=== Queens Park Rangers ===
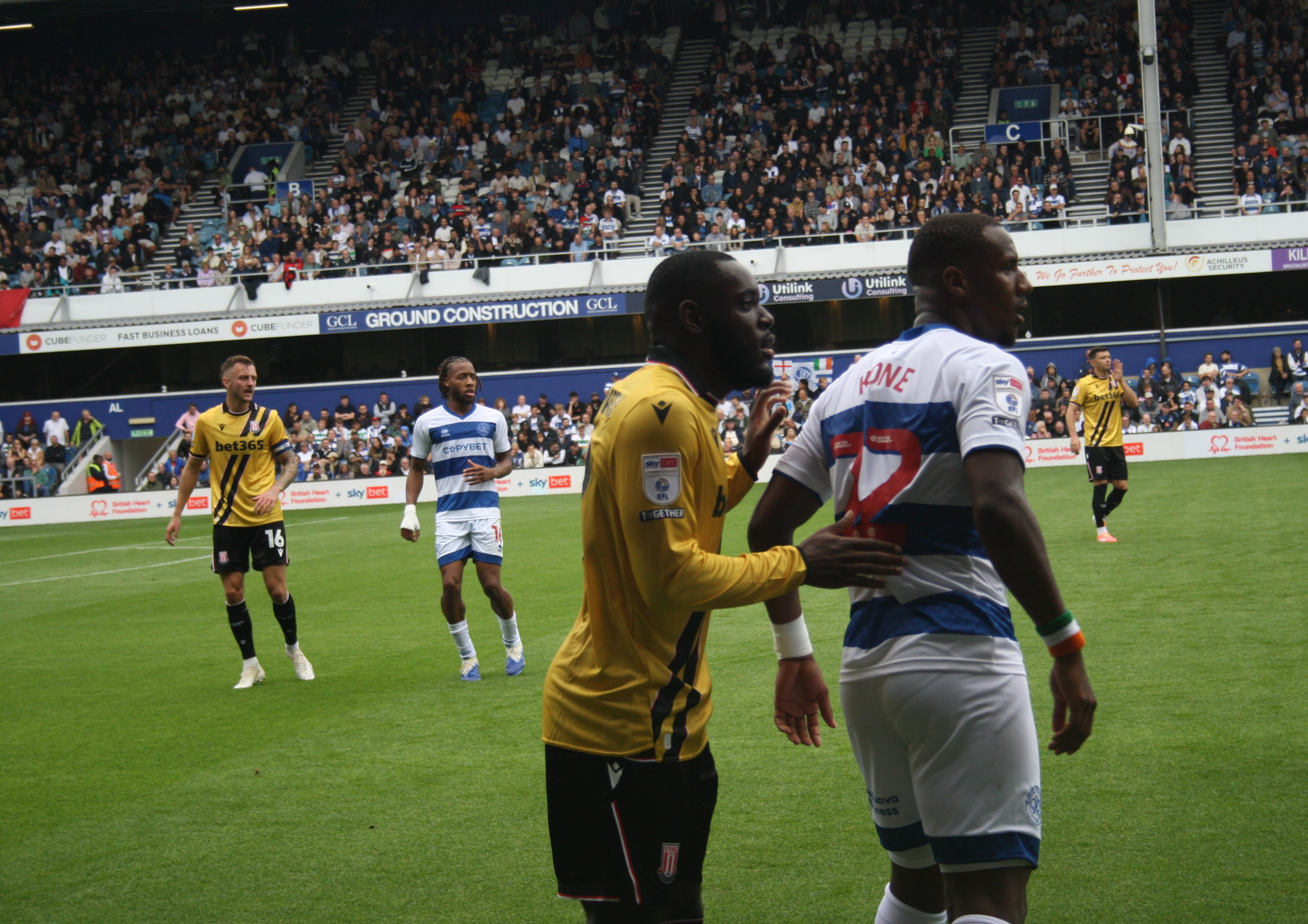
Kone being marked by Junior Tchamadeu during Queens Park Rangers’ match against Stoke City on 20 September 2025.

In August 2025, Kone signed for Queens Park Rangers for an undisclosed fee.

He made his Queens Park Rangers debut as a second-half substitute during the 2–1 loss against Watford in the EFL Championship on 16 August 2025. He scored his first QPR goal during the 7–1 loss against Coventry City on 23 August 2025.. He ended his first season at Loftus Road with 11 goals in all competitions from 44 appearances.

The following season, Kone scored the fastest recorded hat-trick from the start of an English league match since 2004 with a hat-trick within 15 minutes of a 5-0 league win against Swansea City, on 24 October 2026.

== International career ==
Kone represented the Ivory Coast at the Homeless World Cup in 2019. On 27 May 2025, he was called up to the Ivory Coast U23s for a friendly.

Kone was called up to the senior Ivory Coast national team squad for the first time on 5 November 2025 for the friendlies against Saudi Arabia and Oman on 14 and 18 November and he was given shirt number 25. His debut came as a second half substitute during the 2–0 win against Oman.

== Personal life ==
Kone came to the attention of the footballing world during the Homeless World Cup in 2019. When he became a professional footballer in 2024, representatives said he did not want to comment on his personal life as to why he became homeless.

== Career statistics ==
=== Club ===
As of match played 24 October 2026

Appearances and goals by club, season and competition
Club	Season	League			FA Cup		League Cup		Other		Total	
Club	Season	Division	Apps	Goals	Apps	Goals	Apps	Goals	Apps	Goals	Apps	Goals
Athletic Newham	2019–20	Eastern Counties League Division One South	20	14	0	0	—		11 (Note: Two appearances in FA Vase, three appearances and two goals in Eastern Counties League Cup, four appearances and one goal in Eastern Counties League First Division Knockout Cup, two appearances and three goals in London Senior Trophy)	6	31	20
Athletic Newham	2020–21	Eastern Counties League Division One South	8	4	0	0	—		1 (Note: Appearance in London Senior Trophy)	1	9	5
Athletic Newham	2021–22	Essex Senior League	36	31	2	2	—		10 (Note: Five appearances and six goals in FA Vase, one appearance in London Senior Cup, one appearance and one goal in Essex Senior Cup, two appearances and one goal in Peter Butcher Memorial Trophy, one appearance and one goal in Errington Challenge Cup)	9	48	42
Athletic Newham	2022–23	Essex Senior League	32	28	2	0	—		8 (Note: Two appearances and one goal in FA Vase, two appearances and six goals in Peter Butcher Memorial Trophy, four appearances and five goals in Errington Challenge Cup)	12	42	40
Athletic Newham	2023–24	Essex Senior League	13	11	3	5	—		2 (Note: Appearances in FA Vase)	2	18	18
Athletic Newham	Total		109	88	7	7	0	0	32	30	148	125
Wycombe Wanderers	2023–24	League One	17	3	0	0	—		4 (Note: Appearances in EFL Trophy)	1	21	4
Wycombe Wanderers	2024–25	League One	43	18	3	1	3	2	5 (Note: Three appearances in EFL Trophy, two appearances in League One play-offs)	0	54	21
Wycombe Wanderers	2025–26	League One	1	0	—		—		—		1	0
Wycombe Wanderers	Total		61	21	3	1	3	2	9	1	76	25
Queens Park Rangers	2025–26	Championship	43	10	1	1	—		—		44	11
Queens Park Rangers	2026–27	Championship	11	5	0	0	1	0	—		12	5
Queens Park Rangers	Total		64	15	1	1	1	0	—		66	16
Career total			226	124	11	9	4	2	41	31	282	166

=== International ===
As of match played 18 November 2025

Appearances and goals by national team and year
National team	Year	Apps	Goals
Ivory Coast	2025	1	0
Total		1	0

== Honours ==
Wycombe Wanderers

- EFL Trophy runner-up: 2023–24

Individual

- EFL League One Team of the Season: 2024–25
- EFL League One Player of the Season: 2024–25
- EFL League One Young Player of the Season: 2024–25
- PFA Team of the Year: 2024–25 League One
- PFA League One Players' Player of the Year: 2024–25
