= Alex Wilkie (footballer) =

English association football player

Personal information
- Full name: Alex Charles Wilkie
- Date of birth: 11 May 2006 (age 20)
- Place of birth: England
- Position: Defender

Team information
- Current team: Larne

Youth career
- 2022–2023: Eastleigh

Senior career*
Years	Team	Apps	(Gls)
2023–2024	Cheltenham Town	0	(0)
2023–2024	→ Fairford Town (loan)	20	(0)
2024–2025	Eastleigh	0	(0)
2024–2025	→ Winchester City (dual-registration)	38	(1)
2025–2026	Queens Park Rangers	0	(0)
2025	→ Hampton & Richmond Borough (loan)	6	(0)
2026	→ Chippenham Town (loan)	4	(0)
2026–	Larne	0	(0)
- * Club domestic league appearances and goals as of 21:12, 28 July 2026 (UTC)

Alex Charles Wilkie (born 11 May 2006) is an English professional footballer who plays as a defender for NIFL Premiership club Larne.

== Club career ==
=== Early career ===
Wilkie began his career at Eastleigh as an under-16 before moving to Cheltenham Town ahead of the 2023–24 season, signing a two-year scholarship, initially. During his stint at the club, Wilkie also spent time on loan at Fairford Town in the Hellenic League. His spell there was brief, and he returned to Eastleigh before joining Winchester City on a dual-registration basis, where he made over 40 appearances in all competitions for the Southern League side.

=== Queens Park Rangers ===
In May 2025, it was announced that Wilkie would join Championship side Queens Park Rangers after a successful trial with the club. On 12 August 2025, he made his first-team debut for Queens Park Rangers in a 3–2 away defeat to Plymouth Argyle in the EFL Cup, playing the full 90 minutes.

On 8 November 2025, Wilkie joined National League South side, Hampton & Richmond Borough on a short-term loan. He went onto feature 7 times in all competitions before returning to Queens Park Rangers a month later.

On 26 March 2026, Wilkie returned to the National League South to join Chippenham Town on loan for the remainder of the season.

=== Larne ===
On 14 August 2026, Wilkie joined NIFL Premiership club Larne for an undisclosed fee.

== Career statistics ==
As of match played 25 April 2026

Appearances and goals by club, season and competition
Club	Season	League			Domestic Cup		League Cup		Other		Total	
Club	Season	Division	Apps	Goals	Apps	Goals	Apps	Goals	Apps	Goals	Apps	Goals
Cheltenham Town	2023–24	League One	0	0	0	0	0	0	0	0	0	0
Fairford Town (loan)	2023–24	Hellenic League Premier Division	20	0	—		—		0	0	20	0
Eastleigh	2024–25	National League	0	0	—		—		—		0	0
Winchester City (dual-reg.)	2024–25	Southern League Premier Division South	38	1	3	0	—		3 (Note: Appearances in the FA Trophy)	0	44	1
Queens Park Rangers	2025–26	Championship	0	0	0	0	1	0	—		1	0
Hampton & Richmond Borough (loan)	2025–26	National League South	6	0	—		—		1	0	7	0
Chippenham Town (loan)	2025–26	National League South	4	0	—		—		—		4	0
Larne	2026–27	NIFL Premiership	0	0	0	0	0	0	0	0	0	0
Career total			68	1	3	0	1	0	4	0	76	1

== Honours ==
=== Club ===
Queens Park Rangers Development Squad

- London Senior Cup champions: 2025–26
