= Esquerdinha (footballer, born 2006) =

Brazilian footballer (born 2006)

Personal information
- Full name: João Henrique Mendes da Silva
- Date of birth: 28 February 2006 (age 20)
- Place of birth: São Gonçalo, Brazil
- Position: Left-back

Team information
- Current team: Queens Park Rangers
- Number: 28

Youth career
- 2015–2023: Fluminense

Senior career*
Years	Team	Apps	(Gls)
2023–2025	Fluminense	8	(0)
2025–	Queens Park Rangers	16	(0)

International career^{‡}
2022	Brazil U17	9	(0)
- * Club domestic league appearances and goals as of 11:24, 10 August 2025 (UTC) ‡ National team caps and goals as of 10 August 2023

João Henrique Mendes da Silva (born 28 February 2006), commonly known as Esquerdinha, is a Brazilian footballer who plays as a left-back for EFL Championship club Queens Park Rangers.

== Club career ==
Esquerdinha played for Fluminense's youth setup since the age of nine. On 24 March 2022 he signed his first professional contract with the club until 2026. On 26 May 2023 he made his competitive debut in a 0–1 defeat against The Strongest in the Copa Libertadores.

=== Queens Park Rangers ===
In February 2025, Esquerdinha joined the development squad of EFL Championship club Queens Park Rangers.

On 9 August 2025, the opening day of the 2025–26 season, Esquerdinha made his debut in a 1–1 draw with Preston North End.

On 18th September 2025, he was named as the 1206th player to play for Queens Park Rangers with his debut on 9 August.

== International career ==
Esquerdinha played for Brazil under-17 team in 2022.
