= Elijah Dixon-Bonner =

English footballer (born 2001)

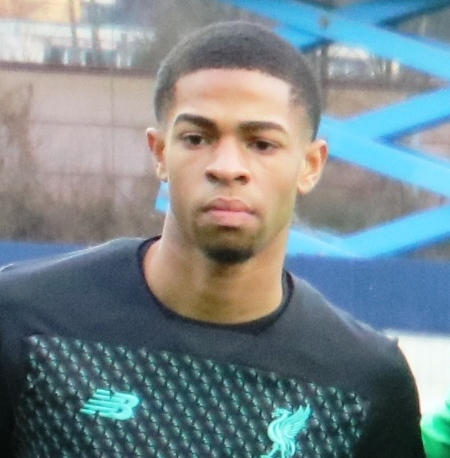
- Dixon-Bonner in 2019

Personal information
- Full name: Elijah Malik Dixon-Bonner
- Date of birth: 1 January 2001 (age 25)
- Place of birth: Harlow, England
- Height: 1.83 m (6 ft 0 in)
- Position: Midfielder

Youth career
- 2009–2015: Arsenal
- 2015–2020: Liverpool

Senior career*
Years	Team	Apps	(Gls)
2020–2022	Liverpool	0	(0)
2022–2026	Queens Park Rangers	28	(0)
2025	→ Västerås SK (loan)	5	(0)
2025–2026	→ Morecambe (loan)	14	(1)
2026	→ Wealdstone (loan)	6	(0)

International career
2016–2017	England U16	7	(0)
2017–2018	England U17	4	(0)
- * Club domestic league appearances and goals as of 27 March 2026 (UTC)

Elijah Malik Dixon-Bonner (born 1 January 2001) is an English professional footballer who plays as a midfielder.

== Club career ==
Dixon-Bonner was born in Harlow, Essex and began his career with Arsenal joining the club at Under-9 level before moving to Liverpool in 2015 at the age of 14. He moved through the club's under-16 and under-18 levels, and captained the England under-16 team.

In the 2018–19 season, Dixon-Bonner was part of the victorious FA Youth Cup squad and he scored during the penalty shootout win over Manchester City in the final. He signed his first professional contract with the club in February 2018 and played for the club's under-23 team before signing an extension to his deal in November 2019.

He made his first-team debut on 4 February 2020, as a 90th minute substitute in the FA Cup fourth round replay against Shrewsbury Town.

In the summer of 2021, Dixon-Bonner spent time on trial with Portsmouth, but was not offered a contract. Despite this, he was named in Liverpool's squad for the 2021-22 UEFA Champions League, and featured for the first team in a 2-0 win over Preston North End in the Carabao Cup in October 2021.

In June 2022 it was announced by Liverpool that he would leave the club at the end of the month when his contract expired.

=== Queens Park Rangers ===
On 13 October 2022, Dixon-Bonner joined Championship side Queens Park Rangers following a successful trial. He made his debut for the club coming on as a 82nd minute substitute for Jamal Lowe in a 0–1 home defeat to Birmingham City on 18 March 2023.

In November 2023, Dixon-Bonner made his full league debut, playing the duration of a 1–1 draw with fellow strugglers Rotherham United. The match was new manager Martí Cifuentes' first since his appointment, praising the midfielder's performance and hinting at his importance over the remainder of the season.

On 10 June 2024, Dixon-Bonner signed a new contract to extend his spell at the club.

On 12 March 2025, Dixon-Bonner joined Swedish Superettan club Västerås SK on loan until 8 July.

On 17 September 2025, Dixon-Bonner signed for Morecambe on loan. On 7 January 2026, he was recalled by Queens Park Rangers.

On 10 January 2026, Dixon-Bonner joined National League side Wealdstone on a short-term loan. He returned to Queens Park Rangers on 17 March but was released at the end of the season.

== International career ==
He has captained England under-16 and was a member of the England under-17 squad that hosted the 2018 UEFA European Under-17 Championship.

== Career statistics ==
As of match played 17 January 2026

Appearances and goals by club, season and competition
Club	Season	League			National Cup		League Cup		Europe		Other		Total	
Club	Season	Division	Apps	Goals	Apps	Goals	Apps	Goals	Apps	Goals	Apps	Goals	Apps	Goals
Liverpool U21	2019–20	—			—		—		—		3 (Note: Appearance(s) in EFL Trophy)	1	3	1
Liverpool U21	2020–21	—			—		—		—		2	0	2	0
Liverpool U21	2021–22	—			—		—		—		2	1	2	1
Liverpool U21	Total		0	0	0	0	0	0	0	0	7	2	7	2
Liverpool	2019–20	Premier League	0	0	1	0	0	0	0	0	0	0	1	0
Liverpool	2020–21	Premier League	0	0	0	0	0	0	0	0	0	0	0	0
Liverpool	2021–22	Premier League	0	0	1	0	1	0	0	0	—		2	0
Liverpool	Total		0	0	2	0	1	0	0	0	0	0	3	0
Queens Park Rangers	2022–23	Championship	1	0	0	0	0	0	—		—		1	0
Queens Park Rangers	2023–24	Championship	24	0	1	0	1	0	—		—		26	0
Queens Park Rangers	2024–25	Championship	3	0	0	0	3	0	—		—		6	0
Queens Park Rangers	2025–26	Championship	0	0	0	0	1	0	—		—		1	0
Queens Park Rangers	Total		28	0	1	0	5	0	0	0	0	0	34	0
Västerås SK (loan)	2025	Superettan	5	0	0	0	—		—		—		5	0
Morecambe (loan)	2025–26	National League	14	1	2	0	—		—		1 (Note: Appearance in FA Trophy)	0	17	1
Wealdstone (loan)	2025–26	National League	6	0	0	0	—		—		0	0	6	0
Career total			53	1	5	0	6	0	0	0	8	2	72	3

== Honours ==
Liverpool

- FA Youth Cup: 2018–19
