= List of Lincoln City F.C. managers =

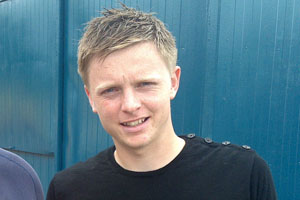
Tom Shaw (pictured) is the current Lincoln City manager with Chris Cohen

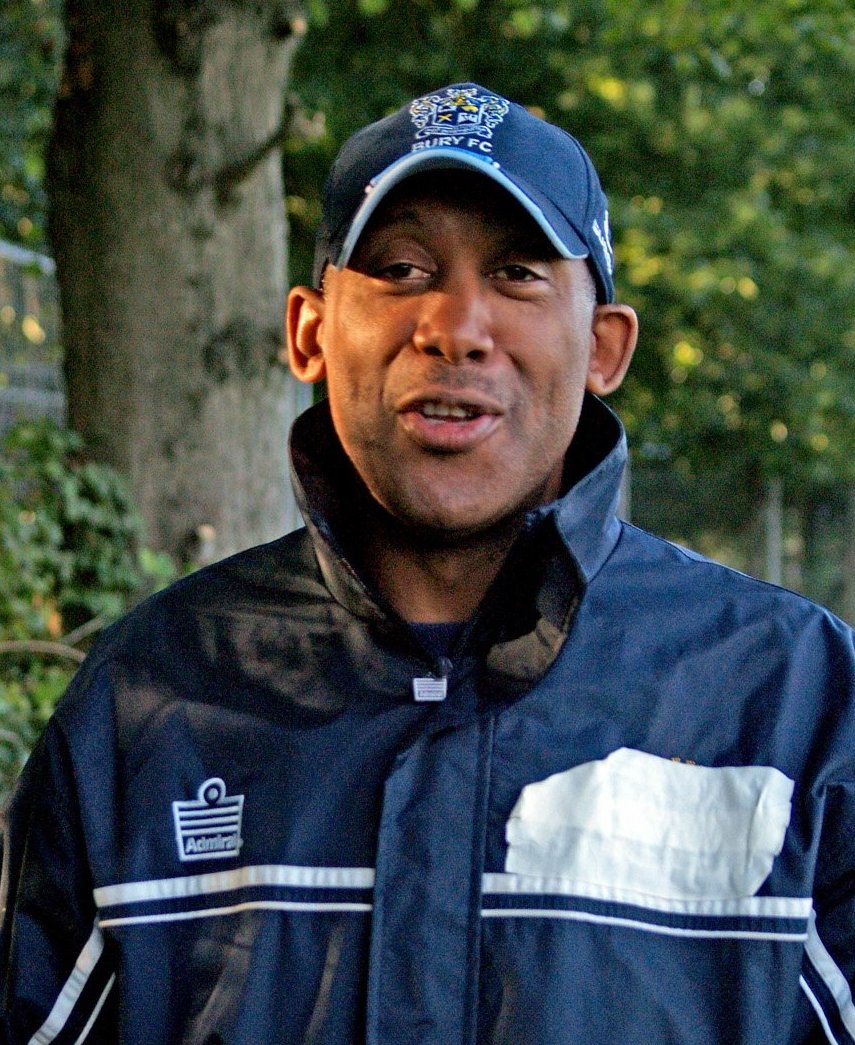
Keith Alexander got Lincoln City to four consecutive play-offs

This is a List of Lincoln City F.C. managers. John Strawson was the first of eight-managers to hold the post of Secretary-Manager, a title that saw the day to day running of the clubs administration combined with the organisation and training of the team. The Directors would then pick the team and hire and fire. Lincoln's first manager Joe McClelland, appointed in 1936, still had to submit his team to the directors for approval. Their longest serving manager was Bill Anderson who was first appointed in 1946 and went onto manage City 855 times. There have been a total of 47 managers appointed to the role on a permanent basis. Michael Skubala took Lincoln City to the second tier of English football for the first time in 65 years. They are currently co-managed by Chris Cohen and Tom Shaw.

== Key ==
- All first-team matches in national competition are counted, except the abandoned 1939–40 Football League season and matches in wartime leagues and cups.
- P = matches played; W = matches won; D = matches drawn; L = matches lost; Win % = win percentage (rounded to two decimal places)

== Managers ==
As of 21 November 2026

#	Name	Nationality	From	To	P	W	D	L	Win %
1	John Strawson	England	September 1892	February 1896	97	31	11	55	31.96
2	Alf Martin	England	1896	March 1897	35	9	2	24	25.71
3	James West	England	1897	1900	106	34	22	50	32.08
4	David Calderhead	Scotland	1 August 1900	1 August 1907	256	89	53	114	34.77
5	John Henry Strawson	England	1 August 1907	31 May 1914	195	52	40	103	26.67
6	George Fraser	Scotland	1 August 1919	31 May 1921	46	10	10	26	21.74
7	David Calderhead Jr.	Scotland	1 April 1921	31 May 1924	118	37	28	53	31.36
8	Horace Henshall	England	1 August 1924	1 May 1926	132	51	28	53	38.64
9	Harry Parkes	England	1 May 1927	1 May 1936	395	187	78	130	47.34
10	Joe McClelland	England	1 May 1936	1 January 1946	140	61	27	52	43.57
11	Bill Anderson	England	1 January 1946	1 January 1965	855	307	189	359	35.91
12	Con Moulson	Republic of Ireland	1 January 1965	1 March 1965	8	0	0	8	0.00
13	Roy Chapman	England	1 March 1965	31 May 1966	65	15	13	37	23.08
14	Ron Gray	England	1 August 1966	1 July 1970	184	60	55	69	32.61
15	Bert Loxley	England	1 July 1970	1 March 1971	32	12	4	16	37.50
16	David Herd	Scotland	1 March 1971	6 December 1972	82	30	30	22	36.59
17	Graham Taylor	England	6 December 1972	20 June 1977	211	97	61	53	45.97
18	George Kerr	Scotland	20 June 1977	1 December 1977	18	5	4	9	27.78
19	Willie Bell	Scotland	21 December 1977	23 October 1978	40	11	13	16	27.50
20	Colin Murphy	England	6 November 1978	1 May 1985	342	133	98	111	38.89
21	John Pickering	England	1 July 1985	20 December 1985	24	4	6	14	16.67
22	George Kerr	Scotland	20 December 1985	7 March 1987	61	17	17	27	27.87
23	Peter Daniel	England	7 March 1987	1 May 1987	12	2	5	5	16.67
24	Colin Murphy	England	26 May 1987	20 May 1990	103	39	26	38	37.86
25	Allan Clarke	England	3 June 1990	30 November 1990	18	3	6	9	16.67
26	Steve Thompson	England	1 November 1990	31 May 1993	128	48	36	44	37.50
27	Keith Alexander	Saint Lucia	1 August 1993	16 May 1994	48	13	13	22	27.08
28	Sam Ellis	England	1 August 1994	4 September 1995	56	21	12	23	37.50
29	Steve Wicks	England	4 September 1995	16 October 1995	7	0	2	5	0.00
30	John Beck	England	16 October 1995	6 March 1998	130	48	42	40	36.92
31	Shane Westley	England	7 March 1998	11 November 1998	30	9	5	16	30.00
32	John Reames	England	11 November 1998	1 June 2000	87	30	21	36	34.48
33	Phil Stant	England	1 June 2000	27 February 2001	38	12	10	16	31.58
34	Alan Buckley	England	28 June 2001	25 April 2002	69	16	24	29	23.19
35	Keith Alexander	Saint Lucia	5 May 2002	24 May 2006	213	81	69	63	38.03
36	John Schofield	England	15 June 2006	15 October 2007	51	21	12	18	41.18
37	Peter Jackson	England	30 October 2007	2 September 2009	92	32	21	39	34.78
38	Chris Sutton	England	28 September 2009	28 September 2010	51	14	14	23	27.45
39	Steve Tilson	England	15 October 2010	11 October 2011	37	11	7	19	29.73
40	David Holdsworth	England	31 October 2011	17 February 2013	71	21	19	31	29.58
41	Gary Simpson	England	27 February 2013	3 November 2014	58	23	15	20	39.66
42	Chris Moyses	England	3 November 2014	12 May 2016	64	22	15	27	34.38
43	Danny Cowley	England	12 May 2016	9 September 2019	176	95	42	39	53.98
44	Michael Appleton	England	23 September 2019	30 April 2022	143	55	33	55	38.46
45	Mark Kennedy	Republic of Ireland	12 May 2022	18 October 2023	73	25	27	21	34.25
46	Michael Skubala	England	13 November 2023	29 May 2026	140	71	33	36	50.71
47	Chris Cohen Tom Shaw	England; England	29 May 2026	present	18	6	3	9	33.33
