= 1922–23 Newport County A.F.C. season =

Welsh association football club season

Newport County
1922–23 season
- Manager: Jimmy Hindmarsh
- Stadium: Somerton Park
- Third Division South: 22nd (re-elected)
- FA Cup: 5th qualifying round
- Welsh Cup: 7th round
- Top goalscorer: League: T.Lowes (8); All: J.Conner (9)
- Highest home attendance: 12,000 vs Millwall (14 Oct 1922)
- Lowest home attendance: 4,000 vs Brentford (24 Mar 1923)/Charlton Athletic (21 Apr 1923)
- Average home league attendance: 7,333
Home colours	Away colours

The 1922–23 season was Newport County's third season in the Football League, second season in the Third Division South and third season overall in the third tier.

== Season review ==
=== Results summary ===
Overall								Home						Away					
Pld	W	D	L	GF	GA	GAv	Pts	W	D	L	GF	GA	Pts	W	D	L	GF	GA	Pts
42	8	11	23	40	70	0.571	27	8	6	7	28	21	22	0	5	16	12	49	5

Source: rsssf.com

=== Results by round ===
Round	1	2	3	4	5	6	7	8	9	10	11	12	13	14	15	16	17	18	19	20	21	22	23	24	25	26	27	28	29	30	31	32	33	34	35	36	37	38	39	40	41	42
Ground	H	A	A	H	A	H	A	H	A	H	H	A	H	A	H	A	H	H	A	A	H	A	H	A	H	A	H	A	A	H	A	H	A	H	A	A	H	H	A	H	A	H
Result	L	L	L	W	L	L	L	D	D	D	D	L	L	L	W	D	W	W	L	L	L	D	D	L	D	L	W	L	L	D	D	L	D	L	L	L	W	L	L	W	L	W
Position	20	22	22	21	21	21	21	20	20	21	20	20	21	21	21	21	20	20	20	21	21	21	20	21	21	21	21	21	21	22	22	22	22	22	22	22	22	22	22	22	22	22

Updated to match(es) played on 5 May 1923. Source: statto.com
A = Away; H = Home; W = Win; D = Draw; L = Loss

== Fixtures and results ==
=== Third Division South ===
Date	Opponents	Venue	Result	Scorers	Attendance
26 August 1922	Southend United	H	0–2		11,500
28 August 1922	Bristol Rovers	A	1–3	Whitton	12,000
2 September 1922	Southend United	A	1–3	W.Edwards	9,000
7 September 1922	Bristol Rovers	H	4–1	W.Edwards, Patterson, Fletcher, Brittan	7,000
9 September 1922	Bristol City	A	0–2		10,000
16 September 1922	Bristol City	H	0–1		9,500
23 September 1922	Portsmouth	A	0–2		14,294
30 September 1922	Portsmouth	H	0–0		9,000
7 October 1922	Millwall	A	0–0		18,000
14 October 1922	Millwall	H	0–0		12,000
21 October 1922	Merthyr Town	H	1–1	OG	8,000
28 October 1922	Merthyr Town	A	0–1		5,000
4 November 1922	Luton Town	H	0–3		5,000
11 November 1922	Luton Town	A	0–1		8,500
18 November 1922	Queens Park Rangers	H	1–0	Wood	7,000
25 November 1922	Queens Park Rangers	A	1–1	Gittins	5,000
9 December 1922	Gillingham	H	2–1	Whitton, Graham	8,000
16 December 1922	Brighton & Hove Albion	H	1–0	Conner	8,000
23 December 1922	Brighton & Hove Albion	A	1–2	Wood	7,000
26 December 1922	Swansea Town	A	1–5	Conner	16,000
27 December 1922	Swansea Town	H	1–2	Conner	6,000
30 December 1922	Swindon Town	A	2–2	McDonald, Conner	4,000
6 January 1923	Swindon Town	H	2–2	Hampton 2	10,000
13 January 1923	Gillingham	A	0–3		6,000
20 January 1923	Aberdare Athletic	H	0–0		7,000
27 January 1923	Aberdare Athletic	A	2–6	Whitton 2	7,000
3 February 1923	Exeter City	H	6–2	Lowes 2, Conner 2, Gaughan, Wood	8,000
10 February 1923	Exeter City	A	0–4		5,000
17 February 1923	Northampton Town	A	1–2	Lowes	10,000
24 February 1923	Northampton Town	H	1–1	Charlton	6,000
3 March 1923	Norwich City	A	1–1	Lowes	4,563
10 March 1923	Norwich City	H	1–3	Groves	7,000
17 March 1923	Brentford	A	0–0		5,000
24 March 1923	Brentford	H	0–1		4,000
30 March 1923	Reading	A	0–2		10,000
31 March 1923	Watford	A	1–2	Lowes	6,000
2 April 1923	Reading	H	3–0	Lowes 2, Charlton	7,000
7 April 1923	Watford	H	0–1		7,000
14 April 1923	Charlton Athletic	A	0–6		5,000
21 April 1923	Charlton Athletic	H	4–0	Gittins, Whitton, Lowes, Gaughan	4,000
28 April 1923	Plymouth Argyle	A	0–1		8,000
5 May 1923	Plymouth Argyle	H	1–0	Conner	7,000

=== FA Cup ===
Round	Date	Opponents	Venue	Result	Scorers	Attendance	Notes
5Q	2 December 1922	Aberdare Athletic	A	1–1	Conner	8,000	
5Qr	7 December 1922	Aberdare Athletic	H	1–1	Gittins	10,000	
5Qr2	11 December 1922	Aberdare Athletic	N	1–2	Groves	6,500	At Ninian Park

=== Welsh Cup ===
Round	Date	Opponents	Venue	Result	Scorers	Attendance
6	15 February 1923	Pontypridd	H	4–1	Hampton 2, Groves, Conner	
7	19 March 1923	Swansea Town	A	2–4	Patterson, Charlton	8,000

== League table ==
Pos	Team	Pld	W	D	L	F	A	GA	Pts
1	Bristol City	42	24	11	7	66	40	1.650	59
2	Plymouth Argyle	42	23	7	12	61	29	2.103	53
3	Swansea Town	42	22	9	11	78	45	1.733	53
4	Brighton & Hove Albion	42	20	11	11	52	34	1.529	51
5	Luton Town	42	21	7	14	68	49	1.388	49
6	Millwall	42	14	18	10	45	40	1.125	46
7	Portsmouth	42	19	8	15	58	52	1.115	46
8	Northampton Town	42	17	11	14	54	44	1.227	45
9	Swindon Town	42	17	11	14	62	56	1.107	45
10	Watford	42	17	10	15	57	54	1.056	44
11	Queens Park Rangers	42	16	10	16	54	49	1.102	42
12	Charlton Athletic	42	14	14	14	55	51	1.078	42
13	Bristol Rovers	42	13	16	13	35	36	0.972	42
14	Brentford	42	13	12	17	41	51	0.804	38
15	Southend United	42	12	13	17	49	54	0.907	37
16	Gillingham	42	15	7	20	51	59	0.864	37
17	Merthyr Town	42	11	14	17	39	48	0.813	36
18	Norwich City	42	13	10	19	51	71	0.718	36
19	Reading	42	10	14	18	36	55	0.655	34
20	Exeter City	42	13	7	22	47	84	0.560	33
21	Aberdare Athletic	42	9	11	22	42	70	0.600	29
22	Newport County	42	8	11	23	40	70	0.571	27

Pld = Matches played; W = Matches won; D = Matches drawn; L = Matches lost; F = Goals for; A = Goals against;
GA = Goal average; Pts = Points

Key	
	Division Champions
	Re-elected
	Failed re-election (none)

=== Election ===
Votes	Club	Fate
45	Aberdare Athletic	Re-elected to the Football League
45	Newport County	Re-elected to the Football League
28	Boscombe	Elected to the Football League
9	Llanelly	Not elected to the Football League
8	Pontypridd	Not elected to the Football League
0	Torquay United	Not elected to the Football League
