= 1919–20 Newport County A.F.C. season =

Welsh association football club season

Newport County
1919–20 season
- Manager: Harry Parkes
- Stadium: Somerton Park
- Southern League First Division: 18th
- FA Cup: First round
- Top goalscorer: League: H.Dobson (10); All: H.Dobson (10)
- Highest home attendance: 10,371 vs Portsmouth (1 May 1920)
- Lowest home attendance: 3,957 vs Swindon Town (29 Nov 1919)
- Average home league attendance: 6,183
| Home colours | Away colours |

The 1919–20 season was Newport County's fourth competitive season in the Southern League and the first in the First Division.

== Season review ==
=== Results summary ===
Note: Two points for a win

| Overall | | | | | | | | Home | | | | | | Away | | | | | |
| Pld | W | D | L | GF | GA | Ave | Pts | W | D | L | GF | GA | Ave | W | D | L | GF | GA | Ave |
|---|---|---|---|---|---|---|---|---|---|---|---|---|---|---|---|---|---|---|---|
| 42 | 13 | 7 | 22 | 45 | 70 | 0.64 | 33 | 11 | 5 | 5 | 32 | 18 | 1.78 | 2 | 2 | 17 | 13 | 52 | 0.25 |

Last updated: 1 May 1920.

== Fixtures and results ==
=== Southern League First Division ===
| Date | Opponents | Venue | Result | Scorers | Attendance |
|---|---|---|---|---|---|
| 30 August 1919 | Norwich City | A | 1–4 | Jones | 5,000 |
| 1 September 1919 | Southend United | A | 0–3 | | 2,500 |
| 6 September 1919 | Brentford | H | 2–4 | Harris, Dobson | 5,500 |
| 8 September 1919 | Southend United | H | 0–0 | | 4,000 |
| 11 September 1919 | Watford | H | 0–1 | | 4,000 |
| 13 September 1919 | Merthyr Town | A | 0–3 | | 8,000 |
| 20 September 1919 | Plymouth Argyle | H | 2–1 | Lockly, Richards | 7,000 |
| 27 September 1919 | Bristol Rovers | A | 1–2 | Savage | 10,000 |
| 4 October 1919 | Reading | H | 0–0 | | 6,040 |
| 6 October 1919 | Millwall | A | 1–5 | Savage | 6,000 |
| 11 October 1919 | Southampton | A | 0–2 | | 6,000 |
| 16 October 1919 | Queens Park Rangers | A | 0–1 | | 6,000 |
| 18 October 1919 | Luton Town | H | 0–0 | | 6,414 |
| 25 October 1919 | Gillingham | A | 3–1 | Savage 3 | 6,000 |
| 1 November 1919 | Swansea Town | H | 0–3 | | 6,137 |
| 8 November 1919 | Exeter City | A | 2–1 | Collins 2 | 4,000 |
| 15 November 1919 | Cardiff City | H | 1–3 | Richards | 8,410 |
| 29 November 1919 | Swindon Town | H | 2–0 | Dobson, Gaughan | 3,957 |
| 13 December 1919 | Brighton & Hove Albion | H | 1–0 | Mann | 4,608 |
| 25 December 1919 | Northampton Town | H | 3–0 | Mann 2, Gaughan | 5,671 |
| 26 December 1919 | Northampton Town | A | 1–5 | Devlin | 8,000 |
| 27 December 1919 | Portsmouth | A | 1–3 | Gaughan | 13,800 |
| 3 January 1920 | Norwich City | H | 5–2 | Dobson 2, Mann 2, Devlin | 5,807 |
| 17 January 1920 | Brentford | A | 1–2 | Devlin | 7,000 |
| 24 January 1920 | Merthyr Town | H | 2–0 | Mann, Gaughan | 4,554 |
| 7 February 1920 | Bristol Rovers | H | 0–2 | | 6,419 |
| 14 February 1920 | Reading | A | 0–2 | | |
| 21 February 1920 | Southampton | H | 1–1 | Mann | 6,362 |
| 28 February 1920 | Luton Town | A | 0–4 | | 8,000 |
| 6 March 1920 | Gillingham | H | 4–0 | Devlin 2, Dobson, Gaughan | 4,050 |
| 13 March 1920 | Swansea Town | A | 1–2 | Dobson | 15,000 |
| 20 March 1920 | Exeter City | H | 4–1 | Dobson 2, Savage 2 | 6,004 |
| 24 March 1920 | Watford | A | 0–0 | | 4,000 |
| 27 March 1920 | Cardiff City | A | 0–0 | | 18,000 |
| 2 April 1920 | Crystal Palace | H | 1–0 | Dobson | 10,084 |
| 3 April 1920 | Queens Park Rangers | H | 3–0 | Richards 2, Dobson | 7,990 |
| 5 April 1920 | Crystal Palace | A | 0–3 | | 14,800 |
| 10 April 1920 | Swindon Town | A | 0–3 | | 9,000 |
| 14 April 1920 | Plymouth Argyle | A | 0–3 | | 4,000 |
| 17 April 1920 | Millwall | H | 0–0 | | 6,485 |
| 24 April 1920 | Brighton & Hove Albion | A | 1–3 | Lockley | 10,000 |
| 1 May 1920 | Portsmouth | H | 1–0 | Gaughan | 10,371 |

=== FA Cup ===
| Round | Date | Opponents | Venue | Result | Scorers | Attendance |
|---|---|---|---|---|---|---|
| 4Q | 22 November 1919 | Bath City | H | 5–2 | Richards 2, Lockley, Mann, Savage | 2,575 |
| 5Q | 6 December 1919 | Merthyr Town | H | 1–0 | Mann | 4,606 |
| 6Q | 20 December 1919 | Exeter City | H | 1–0 | Devlin | 7,764 |
| 1 | 10 January 1920 | Leicester City | H | 0–0 | | 7,523 |
| 1r | 15 January 1920 | Leicester City | A | 0–2 | | 21,000 |

== League table ==
| Pos | Team | Pld | W | D | L | F | A | Pts | Notes |
|---|---|---|---|---|---|---|---|---|---|
| 1 | Portsmouth | 42 | 23 | 12 | 7 | 73 | 27 | 58 | To Football League Third Division |
| 2 | Watford | 42 | 26 | 6 | 10 | 69 | 42 | 58 | To Football League Third Division |
| 3 | Crystal Palace | 42 | 22 | 12 | 8 | 69 | 43 | 56 | To Football League Third Division |
| 4 | Cardiff City | 42 | 18 | 17 | 7 | 70 | 43 | 53 | To Football League Second Division |
| 5 | Plymouth Argyle | 42 | 20 | 10 | 12 | 56 | 29 | 50 | To Football League Third Division |
| 6 | Queens Park Rangers | 42 | 18 | 10 | 14 | 62 | 50 | 46 | To Football League Third Division |
| 7 | Reading | 42 | 16 | 13 | 13 | 51 | 43 | 45 | To Football League Third Division |
| 8 | Southampton | 42 | 18 | 8 | 16 | 72 | 63 | 44 | To Football League Third Division |
| 9 | Swansea Town | 42 | 16 | 11 | 15 | 53 | 45 | 43 | To Football League Third Division |
| 10 | Exeter City | 42 | 17 | 9 | 16 | 57 | 52 | 43 | To Football League Third Division |
| 11 | Southend United | 42 | 13 | 17 | 12 | 46 | 48 | 43 | To Football League Third Division |
| 12 | Norwich City | 42 | 15 | 11 | 16 | 64 | 57 | 41 | To Football League Third Division |
| 13 | Swindon Town | 42 | 17 | 7 | 18 | 65 | 67 | 41 | To Football League Third Division |
| 14 | Millwall | 42 | 14 | 12 | 16 | 52 | 55 | 40 | To Football League Third Division |
| 15 | Brentford | 42 | 15 | 10 | 17 | 53 | 59 | 40 | To Football League Third Division |
| 16 | Brighton & Hove Albion | 42 | 14 | 8 | 20 | 60 | 72 | 36 | To Football League Third Division |
| 17 | Bristol Rovers | 42 | 11 | 13 | 18 | 62 | 78 | 35 | To Football League Third Division |
| 18 | Newport County | 42 | 13 | 7 | 22 | 45 | 70 | 33 | To Football League Third Division |
| 19 | Northampton Town | 42 | 12 | 9 | 21 | 64 | 103 | 33 | To Football League Third Division |
| 20 | Luton Town | 42 | 10 | 10 | 22 | 51 | 76 | 30 | To Football League Third Division |
| 21 | Merthyr Town | 42 | 9 | 11 | 22 | 47 | 79 | 29 | To Football League Third Division |
| 22 | Gillingham | 42 | 10 | 7 | 25 | 34 | 74 | 27 | To Football League Third Division |
