= 1920–21 Newport County A.F.C. season =

Welsh association football club season

Newport County
1920–21 season
- Manager: Harry Parkes
- Stadium: Somerton Park
- Third Division: 15th
- FA Cup: 4th qualifying round
- Welsh Cup: 4th round
- Top goalscorer: League: Devlin (12); All: Devlin (12)
- Highest home attendance: 14,500 vs Reading (28 Aug 1920)
- Lowest home attendance: 4,000 vs Norwich City (13 Jan 1921)
- Average home league attendance: 8,576
Home colours	Away colours

The 1920–21 season was Newport County's first season in the Football League. They were founder members of the new Football League Third Division.

== Season review ==
=== Results summary ===
Overall								Home						Away					
Pld	W	D	L	GF	GA	GAv	Pts	W	D	L	GF	GA	Pts	W	D	L	GF	GA	Pts
42	14	9	19	43	64	0.672	37	8	5	8	20	23	21	6	4	11	23	41	16

Source: rsssf.com

=== Results by round ===
Round	1	2	3	4	5	6	7	8	9	10	11	12	13	14	15	16	17	18	19	20	21	22	23	24	25	26	27	28	29	30	31	32	33	34	35	36	37	38	39	40	41	42
Ground	H	A	A	H	A	H	A	H	H	A	H	H	A	H	A	A	H	A	A	H	A	H	H	A	H	A	H	A	H	A	H	A	H	A	A	H	H	A	A	H	A	H
Result	L	L	L	L	L	D	W	W	W	L	L	W	W	W	W	L	L	L	D	D	L	W	W	L	D	W	L	L	L	L	W	D	L	L	W	L	D	W	D	W	D	D
Position	17	19	22	22	22	22	22	21	17	21	21	18	15	13	11	13	18	18	17	16	18	16	13	15	15	15	15	17	17	19	18	17	18	19	18	19	18	18	19	16	16	15

Updated to match(es) played on 7 May 1921. Source: statto.com
A = Away; H = Home; W = Win; D = Draw; L = Loss

== Fixtures and results ==
=== Third Division ===
Date	Opponents	Venue	Result	Scorers	Attendance
28 August 1920	Reading	H	0–1		14,500
1 September 1920	Bristol Rovers	A	2–3	Walker, Wolstenholme	10,000
4 September 1920	Reading	A	0–4		10,000
9 September 1920	Bristol Rovers	H	0–2		8,000
11 September 1920	Plymouth Argyle	A	1–5	Wolstenholme	12,000
18 September 1920	Plymouth Argyle	H	0–0		8,000
25 September 1920	Exeter City	A	1–0	Wolstenholme	8,000
2 October 1920	Exeter City	H	2–0	Wolstenholme 2	8,000
9 October 1920	Millwall	H	3–1	Devlin 2, Walker	14,000
16 October 1920	Millwall	A	0–1		20,000
21 October 1920	Swindon Town	H	0–1		10,000
23 October 1920	Portsmouth	H	1–0	Devlin	9,000
30 October 1920	Portsmouth	A	2–0	Devlin, Dobson	13,679
6 November 1920	Gillingham	H	1–0	Wolstenholme	7,000
13 November 1920	Gillingham	A	4–1	Dobson, Wolstenholme, Blott, Devlin	8,000
27 November 1920	Swindon Town	A	0–5		7,000
4 December 1920	Watford	H	0–2		6,000
11 December 1920	Watford	A	1–5	Wright	7,000
18 December 1920	Brentford	A	2–2	Wright, Thompson	6,000
25 December 1920	Southend United	H	1–1	Dobson	9,000
27 December 1920	Southend United	A	1–2	Walker	10,000
1 January 1921	Brentford	H	3–1	Dobson, Walker, Cox	7,500
13 January 1921	Norwich City	H	2–0	Wright, Cox	4,000
22 January 1921	Norwich City	A	0–3		5,000
29 January 1921	Northampton Town	H	1–1	Dobson	8,000
5 February 1921	Northampton Town	A	2–0	Groves, Wright	8,000
12 February 1921	Crystal Palace	H	0–1		12,000
19 February 1921	Crystal Palace	A	0–2		7,000
26 February 1921	Brighton & Hove Albion	H	0–4		8,000
5 March 1921	Brighton & Hove Albion	A	0–1		8,000
12 March 1921	Grimsby Town	H	2–1	Devlin, Kelson	8,000
19 March 1921	Grimsby Town	A	1–1	Devlin	9,000
25 March 1921	Merthyr Town	H	0–3		12,600
26 March 1921	Queens Park Rangers	A	0–2		10,000
28 March 1921	Merthyr Town	A	2–1	Gaughan, Devlin	6,000
2 April 1921	Queens Park Rangers	H	1–3	Devlin	7,500
9 April 1921	Swansea Town	H	1–1	Walker	6,000
16 April 1921	Swansea Town	A	2–1	Dobson, Wolstenholme	14,000
23 April 1921	Luton Town	A	2–2	Walker, Devlin	9,000
30 April 1921	Luton Town	H	2–0	Devlin 2	5,000
2 May 1921	Southampton	A	0–0		6,000
7 May 1921	Southampton	H	0–0		8,000

=== FA Cup ===
Round	Date	Opponents	Venue	Result	Scorers	Attendance
4Q	20 November 1920	Merthyr Town	Somerton Park	0–0		15,000
4Qr	25 November 1920	Merthyr Town	Penydarren Park	0–4		15,000

=== Welsh Cup ===
Round	Date	Opponents	Venue	Result	Scorers	Attendance
3	15 January 1921	Ebbw Vale	Somerton Park	4–0	Dobson 2, Walker, Wright	5,000
4	15 January 1921	Merthyr Town	Somerton Park	0–1		5,000

== League table ==
Pos	Team	Pld	W	D	L	F	A	GA	GD	Pts
1	Crystal Palace	42	24	11	7	70	34	2.059	+36	59
2	Southampton	42	19	16	7	64	28	2.286	+36	54
3	Queens Park Rangers	42	22	9	11	61	32	1.906	+29	53
4	Swindon Town	42	21	10	11	73	49	1.490	+24	52
5	Swansea Town	42	18	15	9	56	45	1.244	+11	51
6	Watford	42	20	8	14	59	44	1.341	+15	48
7	Millwall	42	18	11	13	42	30	1.400	+12	47
8	Merthyr Town	42	15	15	12	60	49	1.224	+11	45
9	Luton Town	42	16	12	14	61	56	1.089	+5	44
10	Bristol Rovers	42	18	7	17	68	57	1.193	+11	43
11	Plymouth Argyle	42	11	21	10	35	34	1.029	+1	43
12	Portsmouth	42	12	15	15	46	48	0.958	–2	39
13	Grimsby Town	42	15	9	18	49	59	0.831	–10	39
14	Northampton Town	42	15	8	19	59	75	0.787	–16	38
15	Newport County	42	14	9	19	43	64	0.672	–21	37
16	Norwich City	42	10	16	16	44	53	0.830	–9	36
17	Southend United	42	14	8	20	44	61	0.721	–17	36
18	Brighton & Hove Albion	42	14	8	20	42	61	0.689	–19	36
19	Exeter City	42	10	15	17	39	54	0.722	–15	35
20	Reading	42	12	7	23	42	59	0.712	–17	31
21	Brentford	42	9	12	21	42	67	0.627	–25	30
22	Gillingham	42	8	12	22	34	74	0.459	–40	28

Pld = Matches played; W = Matches won; D = Matches drawn; L = Matches lost; F = Goals for; A = Goals against;
GA = Goal average; GD = Goal difference; Pts = Points

Key	
	Division Champions
	Re-elected
	Failed re-election (none)
