= Reames =

Reames is a surname. Notable people with the surname include:

- Alfred E. Reames (1870–1943), American attorney and politician
- Britt Reames (born 1973), American baseball player
- John Reames (1942–2008), British football manager
- Richard Reames (born 1957), American arborsculptor
