= Roy McDonald =

Roy McDonald may refer to:

- Roy McDonald (footballer) (1896–1970), Welsh footballer
- Roy McDonald (poet) (1937–2018), Canadian poet and busker
- Roy J. McDonald (born 1947), New York politician
- Roy McDonald, drummer for rock bands The Muffs, Redd Kross and formerly of The Things
