= Eric Taylor (football manager) =

English footballer

Eric Woodhouse Taylor was a football administrator who spent his entire 45-year career at Sheffield Wednesday serving as manager, secretary and eventually vice-president. During his time at the club he rose from office boy to vice-president and became known as "Mr. Sheffield Wednesday".

== Early life and office boy ==
Taylor was born in the Sheffield suburb of Fulwood in May 1912, although he spent his formative years in Birley Carr very close to the Sheffield Wednesday ground. He rapidly gained a lifelong love of the club, slipping into the ground to see the final few minutes of games when the gates were opened.

Taylor started his working life in a law office, but in 1929, at the age of 17, he was appointed by Wednesday as office boy to the manager Bob Brown on a wage of seven shillings and sixpence a week. Wednesday had won the First Division championship in the 1928–29 season and it is said the appointment was a reward to the manager for this. In November 1934 Taylor was promoted to the post of assistant secretary when Joe McClelland, caretaker manager and former assistant to Brown, departed the club. Taylor remained in this role until 1942.

Part-time football during the Second World War saw Wednesday having to make financial savings, and team manager Jimmy McMullan was told that his contract would not be renewed for 1942. Club chairman William Turner reshuffled the remaining staff, and Eric Taylor was given the additional job of part-time manager of team affairs.

It seems that Taylor’s rise to team manager was only to be a temporary appointment until the end of the war; he had never played or coached league football. However, he made a good impression in the job and led Wednesday to the final of the North Football League War Cup in 1943, losing to Blackpool over two legs. At the end of the war club chairman William Fearnehough rewarded Taylor with a new contract and the title of Secretary/Manager on 14 June 1945.

== Secretary / manager ==
During his time as secretary/manager, Taylor was very much an office based manager. Seen rarely at the training ground, he had negligible input on tactics or team selection. Day to day training sessions were left to the coaches such as Bill Knox, Alan Brown or Jack Marshall, with Taylor involved in watching potential signings and negotiating transfers.

In Taylor’s first full season as manager after the war, Wednesday struggled and narrowly avoided relegation to Division Three North. However, he slowly built a team which gained promotion back to Division One in the 1949–50 season. Throughout the 1950s Wednesday became known as a yo-yo club being promoted or relegated on six occasions under Taylor’s management.

Their most successful period during this time coincided with Taylor’s signing of Jackie Sewell in 1951 for £34,500, then British record transfer fee, and the emergence of Derek Dooley as a prolific goalscorer. During this time they were Division Two champions in 1951–52 and then spent three consecutive seasons in Division One, but with little success. After another relegation back to Division Two in 1958, the board of directors and Taylor agreed that he should step down. He was replaced by Harry Catterick, brought in from Rochdale, to become team manager.

== Secretary / general manager ==
Freed from responsibility for team affairs, Taylor showed flair and vision as an administrator for the club. After hearing that England were favourites to host the 1966 FIFA World Cup, he was determined to get Hillsborough to stage some of the group games in the competition. In preparation for this he travelled to Chile in 1962 to see the staging of the 1962 FIFA World Cup.

As a result of Taylor’s groundwork, Hillsborough was chosen as one of the 1966 venues, receiving funding from the FA for ground redevelopment, including the complete rebuilding of the Leppings Lane end. In July 1966 the stadium hosted three matches in the Group 2, and a quarter-final played by West Germany and Uruguay.

At the end of the World Cup Hillsborough was voted the best provincial venue in the competition. As a result of his efforts, Taylor was offered the post of Executive Secretary by the fledgling North American Soccer League (NASL) to organise the new professional soccer league in the United States for then very high salary of £11,000 per annum (inflation-adjusted £170,000 in 2024). After much thought, Taylor stayed with Wednesday.

In 1967 Taylor was involved in a serious car accident but recovered to return to his duties with Wednesday.

== Retirement, death and testimonial match ==
In January 1974 Taylor announced that he would retire the following summer, and stepped down from his post on 30 July 1974. He was immediately named vice-president of the club, and agreed to act as a consultant. Just twelve weeks after retiring Taylor died on 23 September 1974, aged 62. On 21 October 1974 a testimonial match was held at Hillsborough in memory of Taylor. The match was held between Sheffield Wednesday and an England XI; Don Revie had just been appointed England manager and he sent a strong team which won the match 5-0. Taylor is buried at Christ Church, Fulwood in Sheffield.
