= 1921–22 Newport County A.F.C. season =

Welsh association football club season

Newport County
1921–22 season
- Manager: Harry Parkes
- Stadium: Somerton Park
- Third Division South: 20th
- FA Cup: 1st round
- Welsh Cup: 3rd round
- Top goalscorer: League: W.F.Edwards (10); All: Devlin (13)
- Highest home attendance: 10,000 vs Merthyr Town (5 Nov 1921)/Millwall (27 Dec 1921)
- Lowest home attendance: 6,000 vs Southend United (12 Sep 1921)
- Average home league attendance: 7,976
Home colours	Away colours

The 1921–22 season was Newport County's second season in the Football League. Due to league restructuring they were founding members of the new Football League Third Division South.

== Season review ==
=== League ===
==== Results summary ====
Overall								Home						Away					
Pld	W	D	L	GF	GA	GAv	Pts	W	D	L	GF	GA	Pts	W	D	L	GF	GA	Pts
42	11	12	19	44	61	0.721	34	8	7	6	22	18	23	3	5	13	22	43	11

Source: rsssf.com

==== Results by round ====
Round	1	2	3	4	5	6	7	8	9	10	11	12	13	14	15	16	17	18	19	20	21	22	23	24	25	26	27	28	29	30	31	32	33	34	35	36	37	38	39	40	41	42
Ground	A	H	H	A	A	H	H	A	H	A	H	H	A	H	A	A	H	A	A	A	H	A	H	H	A	H	A	H	A	H	A	H	H	A	A	A	H	H	A	H	H	A
Result	L	L	W	L	L	W	D	D	W	L	W	D	L	L	L	L	D	W	D	D	W	D	L	D	W	L	L	W	L	W	L	L	D	L	D	W	D	D	L	W	L	L
Position	18	20	14	16	22	16	18	15	11	14	11	13	14	15	16	16	16	16	17	16	15	15	15	15	16	16	16	14	15	14	15	16	16	18	18	17	19	19	20	20	20	20

Updated to match(es) played on 6 May 1922. Source: statto.com
A = Away; H = Home; W = Win; D = Draw; L = Loss

== Fixtures and results ==
=== Third Division South ===
Date	Opponents	Venue	Result	Scorers	Attendance
27 August 1921	Reading	A	0–1		11,000
29 August 1921	Queens Park Rangers	H	0–1		8,000
3 September 1921	Reading	H	1–0	Devlin	7,000
5 September 1921	Queens Park Rangers	A	1–2	Devlin	7,000
10 September 1921	Luton Town	A	0–4		10,000
12 September 1921	Southend United	H	2–1	Walker, W.Edwards	6,000
17 September 1921	Luton Town	H	2–2	Devlin, Lythgoe	8,000
24 September 1921	Norwich City	A	2–2	Walker, W.Edwards	8,000
1 October 1921	Norwich City	H	1–0	Dobson	8,000
8 October 1921	Swindon Town	A	2–3	W.Edwards 2	9,000
15 October 1921	Swindon Town	H	4–0	Gaughan 2, Devlin, Lythgoe	8,000
22 October 1921	Plymouth Argyle	H	0–0		8,000
29 October 1921	Plymouth Argyle	A	0–1		14,000
5 November 1921	Merthyr Town	H	0–2		10,000
12 November 1921	Merthyr Town	A	1–2	W.Edwards	10,000
19 November 1921	Portsmouth	A	3–4	W.Edwards 2, Devlin	13,000
26 November 1921	Portsmouth	H	0–0		8,000
10 December 1921	Southend United	A	1–0	Price	12,000
24 December 1921	Swansea Town	A	2–2	Lythgoe, Gaughan	10,000
26 December 1921	Millwall	A	1–1	Walker	17,000
27 December 1921	Millwall	H	1–0	W.Edwards	10,000
31 December 1921	Exeter City	A	2–2	Groves, W.Edwards	5,000
2 January 1922	Swansea Town	H	2–3	Devlin 2	9,000
14 January 1922	Exeter City	H	1–1	Walker	9,000
21 January 1922	Bristol Rovers	A	4–3	Lythgoe 2, Brittan 2	8,000
28 January 1922	Bristol Rovers	H	0–1		6,000
4 February 1922	Brentford	A	0–1		8,000
11 February 1922	Brentford	H	2–1	Walker, Devlin	6,500
18 February 1922	Aberdare Athletic	A	0–3		7,000
25 February 1922	Aberdare Athletic	H	1–0	Devlin	9,000
4 March 1922	Brighton & Hove Albion	A	0–3		8,000
11 March 1922	Brighton & Hove Albion	H	0–1		9,000
18 March 1922	Watford	H	0–0		7,000
25 March 1922	Watford	A	0–1		5,000
8 April 1922	Charlton Athletic	A	1–1	Gaughan	6,000
14 April 1922	Gillingham	A	2–0	Groves, Walker	10,000
15 April 1922	Northampton Town	H	2–2	W.Edwards, Gittins	8,000
17 April 1922	Gillingham	H	1–1	Walker	9,000
22 April 1922	Northampton Town	A	0–2		3,000
27 April 1922	Charlton Athletic	H	2–1	Walker, Shelton	6,000
29 April 1922	Southampton	H	0–1		8,000
6 May 1922	Southampton	A	0–5		9,000

=== FA Cup ===
Round	Date	Opponents	Venue	Result	Scorers	Attendance
5Q	3 December 1921	Bath City	H	2–0	Devlin, Walker	6,000
6Q	17 December 1921	Wrexham	A	0–0		8,000
6Qr	21 December 1921	Wrexham	H	3–0	Devlin 3	5,000
1	7 January 1922	Newcastle United	A	0–6		28,507

=== Welsh Cup ===
Round	Date	Opponents	Venue	Result	Scorers	Attendance
3	18 January 1922	Cardiff City	A	1–7	Gaughan	6,000

== League table ==
Pos	Team	Pld	W	D	L	F	A	GA	Pts
1	Southampton	42	23	15	4	68	21	3.238	61
2	Plymouth Argyle	42	25	11	6	63	24	2.625	61
3	Portsmouth	42	18	17	7	62	39	1.590	53
4	Luton Town	42	22	8	12	64	35	1.829	52
5	Queens Park Rangers	42	18	13	11	53	44	1.205	49
6	Swindon Town	42	16	13	13	72	60	1.200	45
7	Watford	42	13	18	11	54	48	1.125	44
8	Aberdare Athletic	42	17	10	15	57	51	1.118	44
9	Brentford	42	16	11	15	52	43	1.209	43
10	Swansea Town	42	13	15	14	50	47	1.064	41
11	Merthyr Town	42	17	6	19	45	56	0.804	40
12	Millwall	42	10	18	14	38	42	0.905	38
13	Reading	42	14	10	18	40	47	0.851	38
14	Bristol Rovers	42	14	10	18	52	67	0.776	38
15	Norwich City	42	12	13	17	50	62	0.806	37
16	Charlton Athletic	42	13	11	18	43	56	0.768	37
17	Northampton Town	42	13	11	18	47	71	0.662	37
18	Gillingham	42	14	8	20	47	60	0.783	36
19	Brighton & Hove Albion	42	13	9	20	45	51	0.882	35
20	Newport County	42	11	12	19	44	61	0.721	34
21	Exeter City	42	11	12	19	38	59	0.644	34
22	Southend United	42	8	11	23	34	74	0.459	27

Pld = Matches played; W = Matches won; D = Matches drawn; L = Matches lost; F = Goals for; A = Goals against;
GA = Goal average; Pts = Points

Key	
	Division Champions
	Re-elected
	Failed re-election (none)
