= 1958–59 Newport County A.F.C. season =

Welsh association football club season

Newport County
1958–59 season
- Manager: Billy Lucas
- Stadium: Somerton Park
- Third Division: 17th
- FA Cup: 4th round
- Welsh Cup: 5th round
- Top goalscorer: League: McPherson (15); All: McPherson (19)
- Highest home attendance: 10,968 vs Chesterfield (30 August 1958)
- Lowest home attendance: 2,447 vs Stockport County (25 April 1959)
- Average home league attendance: 6,603
Home colours	Away colours

The 1958–59 season saw the Third Division North and South from the previous season consolidated into the Third and Fourth Divisions. Newport County qualified for the Third Division with a top-half finish, marking their second season in the division. They had been founder members prior to the 1921–22 season.

== Season review ==
=== Results summary ===
Overall								Home						Away					
Pld	W	D	L	GF	GA	GAv	Pts	W	D	L	GF	GA	Pts	W	D	L	GF	GA	Pts
46	17	9	20	69	68	1.015	43	15	2	6	43	24	32	2	7	14	26	44	11

Source: rsssf.com

=== Results by round ===
Round	1	2	3	4	5	6	7	8	9	10	11	12	13	14	15	16	17	18	19	20	21	22	23	24	25	26	27	28	29	30	31	32	33	34	35	36	37	38	39	40	41	42	43	44	45	46
Ground	A	A	H	H	A	A	H	H	A	A	H	H	A	H	A	H	A	H	A	A	H	H	H	H	A	A	A	H	A	H	H	A	A	H	H	H	A	H	A	A	H	A	A	H	A	H
Result	L	D	L	W	D	D	W	W	L	L	L	L	W	W	D	W	D	W	L	L	W	W	D	W	D	L	L	W	L	L	D	L	L	W	W	W	L	L	L	L	W	W	L	W	D	L
Position	20	19	23	17	21	18	14	8	12	15	19	20	20	17	17	13	15	12	14	15	14	12	12	8	10	12	15	16	17	18	19	19	20	15	14	11	12	16	16	19	19	18	18	17	17	17

Updated to match(es) played on 4 May 1959. Source: statto.com
A = Away; H = Home; W = Win; D = Draw; L = Loss

== Fixtures and results ==
=== Third Division ===
Date	Opponents	Venue	Result	Scorers	Attendance
23 Aug 1958	Norwich City	A	0–3		25,873
27 Aug 1958	Accrington Stanley	A	2–2	McPherson, Singer	10,284
30 Aug 1958	Chesterfield	H	0–1		10,968
4 Sep 1958	Accrington Stanley	H	2–1	McPherson, Singer	8,891
6 Sep 1958	Notts County	A	1–1	Singer	12,249
10 Sep 1958	Wrexham	A	0–0		13,113
13 Sep 1958	Mansfield Town	H	1–0	Singer	8,429
18 Sep 1958	Wrexham	H	2–1	Singer, Herrity	8,113
20 Sep 1958	Swindon Town	A	1–2	Singer	12,522
22 Sep 1958	Halifax Town	A	1–3	McSeveney	5,150
27 Sep 1958	Brentford	H	0–1		8,220
2 Oct 1958	Halifax Town	H	0–2		6,936
4 Oct 1958	Hull City	A	3–2	Jones, McPherson, Singer	14,753
9 Oct 1958	Bradford City	H	3–2	Graham, Singer, Rowland	7,317
11 Oct 1958	Bury	A	0–0		9,412
20 Oct 1958	Queens Park Rangers	H	3–1	McSeveney, McPherson, Graham	8,400
25 Oct 1958	Rochdale	A	1–1	McPherson	4,998
1 Nov 1958	Doncaster Rovers	H	3–1	McPherson 2, Graham	7,316
8 Nov 1958	Plymouth Argyle	A	2–3	Singer, Hollyman	23,482
22 Nov 1958	Colchester United	A	2–3	McPherson, Graham	7,271
29 Nov 1958	Reading	H	2–1	Graham, Sherwood	6,184
13 Dec 1958	Bournemouth & Boscombe Athletic	H	4–1	Jones, Dixon, McSeveney, McPherson	5,392
20 Dec 1958	Norwich City	H	2–2	McSeveney, Jones	4,538
25 Dec 1958	Southampton	H	4–2	McPherson 2, McSeveney, Graham	9,034
27 Dec 1958	Southampton	A	3–3	Sherwood, McSeveney, McPherson	21,495
3 Jan 1959	Chesterfield	A	1–3	McSeveney	9,225
31 Jan 1959	Mansfield Town	A	1–2	McSeveney	8,347
7 Feb 1959	Swindon Town	H	3–0	Jones, McPherson, Graham	4,346
14 Feb 1959	Brentford	A	0–3		10,380
21 Feb 1959	Hull City	H	1–3	Sherwood	6,988
28 Feb 1959	Bury	H	1–1	Dixon	5,214
2 Mar 1959	Stockport County	A	1–2	Graham	8,079
7 Mar 1959	Queens Park Rangers	A	2–4	Graham, Meyer	5,607
9 Mar 1959	Tranmere Rovers	H	3–0	Jones, Meyer, Rowland	4,933
14 Mar 1959	Rochdale	H	1–0	McPherson	4,469
16 Mar 1959	Notts County	H	3–1	McSeveney, Meyer, Brown	5,869
21 Mar 1959	Doncaster Rovers	A	0–1		3,907
28 Mar 1959	Plymouth Argyle	H	0–1		8,108
30 Mar 1959	Southend United	A	0–1		9,672
4 Apr 1959	Tranmere Rovers	A	1–2	Meyer	9,301
13 Apr 1959	Southend United	H	3–1	Graham 2, McSeveney	5,070
18 Apr 1959	Reading	A	3–1	McSeveney, McPherson, Meyer	7,484
22 Apr 1959	Bradford City	A	0–1		8,926
25 Apr 1959	Stockport County	H	2–0	Graham, Meyer	2,447
29 Apr 1959	Bournemouth & Boscombe Athletic	A	1–1	Graham	7,384
4 May 1959	Colchester United	H	0–1		4,702

=== FA Cup ===
Round	Date	Opponents	Venue	Result	Scorers	Attendance
1	15 Nov 1958	Wisbech Town	A	2–2	McPherson, Graham	5,500
1r	17 Nov 1958	Wisbech Town	H	4–1	McSeveney 2, McPherson, Graham	4,848
2	6 Dec 1958	Hereford United	A	2–0	McPherson, Graham	12,012
3	10 Jan 1959	Torquay United	H	0–0		10,600
3r	14 Jan 1959	Torquay United	A	1–0	McPherson	6,567
4	24 Jan 1959	Tottenham Hotspur	A	1–4	Hollyman	50,561

=== Welsh Cup ===
Round	Date	Opponents	Venue	Result	Scorers	Attendance
5	29 Jan 1959	Swansea Town	A	1–3	McSeveney	4,200

== League table ==
Pos	Team	Pld	W	D	L	GF	GA	GAv	Pts
15	Swindon Town	46	16	13	17	59	57	1.035	45
16	Chesterfield	46	17	10	19	67	64	1.047	44
17	Newport County	46	17	9	20	69	68	1.015	43
18	Wrexham	46	14	14	18	63	77	0.818	42
19	Accrington Stanley	46	15	12	19	71	87	0.816	42
