= Yo-yo club =

Sporting side that is regularly promoted and relegated

Season-end position for 1. FC Nürnberg since the founding of the Bundesliga in 1963

A yo-yo club is a sporting side that is regularly promoted and relegated. The phrase is most typically used in association football in the United Kingdom, especially in reference to promotion to and relegation from the Premier League.

The name is derived from the toy yo-yo which goes up and down a string. In Germany the equivalent term is Fahrstuhlmannschaft; in Greece it is ομάδα ασανσέρ; in Hispanic countries it is equipo ascensor; in Danish elevatorhold; in Russia they often say команда-лифт; in Turkish asansör and in Chinese it is called 升降机; All seven terms literally mean "lift team" or "elevator team". In the Netherlands, the term is heen-en-weer club - "to-and-fro club". In Polish, yo-yo clubs are referred to as wańka-wstańka, which translates to "roly-poly toy". In Romanian, clubs oscillating between the first and second tier are called ABBA, in reference to these leagues' former names, Divizia A and Divizia B.

In England the phrase has been used to describe, among others, Birmingham City, Burnley, Fulham, Hull City, Norwich City, Peterborough United, Queens Park Rangers, Rotherham United, Sunderland, Watford, West Bromwich Albion, Sheffield United and Wigan Athletic.

West Brom were an archetypal yo-yo club throughout the first decade of the 21st century, during which time they were promoted four times and relegated three times. Similarly, Crystal Palace reached the Premier League five times and were relegated the following season on the first four occasions, but have now survived in the top flight since 2013. In recent years, Norwich City and Fulham became "tandem" yo-yo clubs, because in every season between 2018 and 2022, one club was promoted to the Premier League while the other was relegated.

== Argentina ==
Quilmes Atlético Club is the club with most promotions and relegations in Argentina, with eleven promotions and twelve relegations.

== Brazil ==
Santa Cruz is traditionally a yo-yo club. Playing from 1971 to 1981 on the top flight, since 1982 the club has spent nine seasons in the Brasileirão Série A, 18 seasons in the second division, three in the third division and three in the Brasileirão Série D. Due a severe administrative crisis, the club currently competes at the Campeonato Pernambucano.

Since 2014, Avaí has been promoted to the top flight on even numbered years and relegated to the second division on odd numbered years. Since 2016, Sampaio Corrêa has been relegated to Série C on even numbered years and promoted back to Série B on odd number years.

Since 2005, Coritiba has been relegated to the Brasileirão Série B five times (2005, 2009, 2017, 2020 and 2023), amassing seven relegations from Serie A to Serie B in total, a record high in Brazil.

Other clubs who recently swung between divisions are América Mineiro, Criciúma, Sport Recife, Náutico, Figueirense, Ponte Preta, Bahia, Vitória, Guarani and Vasco. Most of them are from the Northeastern region of Brazil, from Santa Catarina and from smaller cities of São Paulo state.

== England ==
=== Birmingham City ===
Birmingham City have the joint record with Leicester City of most promotions and relegations to and from the top flight, with 13 of each.

Birmingham's longest period in one division has been 18 years in the First Division, from 1921 to 1939. Their next longest is their stint in the EFL Championship which started in 2011 and ended in 2024.

Elected to Division Two in 1892, Birmingham was promoted to Division One in 1894 and relegated in 1896. Their next promotion came in 1901, and was followed immediately by relegation in 1902 and a third promotion in 1903. This time City lasted five years in the First Division, before relegation in 1908.

The next 70 years (including the breaks for the two world wars) were comparatively stable, with only three relegations and four promotions. After the club's seventh relegation, in 1979, it was promoted at the first attempt. The same happened in 1984 and 1985, but after the ninth relegation, in 1986, they spent 16 years out of the top flight.

During these 16 seasons Birmingham had two separate spells in the Third Division: from 1989 to 1992 (three seasons), and from 1994 to 1995 (one season).

Birmingham were promoted to the Premier League for the first time in 2002. Their first spell in this league lasted four years, however in the four years from 2006 to 2009, they were relegated twice and promoted twice.

In 2011 they were relegated again, and this was the eighth time since 1979 that this had happened to Birmingham. Six of these relegations were between the top two divisions, and two were between the second and third. They remained in the second-tier Championship until 2024, when they got relegated down to League One, and were promptly promoted back to the Championship in 2025.

=== Brighton & Hove Albion ===
Brighton & Hove Albion have had only, until 2017, one brief spell in the top flight of English football, from 1979 to 1983, but in the 53 years since 1958 they have been relegated nine times and promoted 10 times.

Founder members of the Football League Third Division in 1920, they remained at that level (Third Division South from 1921) for 31 seasons (38 years, including the break for World War II). Since 1958, the longest period they have spent in any one division has been seven years in the Third, from 1965 to 1972.

After winning promotion to the Second Division for the first time in 1958, they suffered consecutive relegations in 1962 and 1963 to reach the Fourth Division for the first time. (The Fourth Division was created in 1958.) Sixteen years later in 1979 they reached the other extreme when they won promotion to the First Division for the first time, but 17 years after that in 1996 they were back in the fourth tier of English football (now known as Football League Two).

In the six years from 2001 to 2006, Brighton experienced three promotions and two relegations, leaving them in the third tier (now known as Football League One), and in 2011 they were promoted to the Championship.

In 2017, Brighton finally achieved promotion back into the top flight for the first time in 34 years, finishing second and gaining automatic promotion. They have remained in the Premier League since, with their sixth place in the 2022-23 season being their highest ever finish and first ever qualification for Europe.

=== Burnley ===
Since their entry into league football in 1888, Burnley have been promoted thirteen times and relegated fourteen times. Their first relegation was in 1896–97 from Division One to Division Two, but returned the following season, having finished first in the lower division, only to be relegated again, two years later in the year 1900. In 1913, they were promoted once again to the top division, where they remained until 1930, when they were once again relegated. In 1947, they returned to the First Division, and spent several decades there, until they were relegated in 1971, returning two years later in 1973.

In 1976, they returned to Division Two, and in 1980, they were further relegated to Division Three, spending two seasons there before returning to Division Two in 1982, only to be relegated again to Division Three a year later in 1983. In 1985, they finished in 21st place in Division Three and were relegated to Division Four, finishing in their lowest historical league position, 22nd place in 1987. They spent seven seasons in Division Four before being promoted to what became Division Two coinciding with the restructuring of the professional league system with the arrival of the Premier League.

In 1994, they were promoted to the second tier of professional football, Division One, returning the following season. It wasn't until the year 2000 when Burnley returned to Division One which became known as the Championship from the 2004–05 season onwards. They remained there for nine years before being promoted to the Premier League in 2010, remaining just one season before returning to the Championship one year later. Promoted again to the Premier League in 2014, they were relegated in 2015, only to return in 2016, where they remained until suffering a further relegation in 2022. In 2023, they won the Championship in first place, promoted again for the 2023–24 season, only to be relegated once again to the Championship in May 2024. Following their second place finish in the league table, the team returned to the Premier League in April 2025 with automatic promotion, but were relegated straight back down to the Championship in April 2026 after another terrible season which saw the Clarets finish second bottom but with a far worse goal differential than cellar dwellers Wolves.

=== Grimsby Town ===
Grimsby Town are the most frequent yo-yo club, switching divisions a total of 32 times in their history with 15 promotions and 17 relegations as well as transferring from the Third Division South to the Third Division North in 1921.

Their longest consecutive spell in the same division was 8, immediately after they were founder members of the Second Division, between 1892 and 1901.

Promotion years: 1901, 1911, 1926, 1929, 1934, 1956, 1962, 1972, 1979, 1980, 1990, 1991, 1998, 2016, 2022

Relegation years: 1903, 1910, 1920, 1932, 1948, 1951, 1959, 1964, 1968, 1977, 1987, 1988, 1997, 2003, 2004, 2010, 2021

=== Hull City ===
Hull City have been promoted to the Premier League in 2008, 2013, 2016 and 2026, with relegations to the Championship in 2010, 2015 and 2017.

=== Leicester City ===
Leicester City had three separate spells in the Premier League between 1994 and 2004. The second lasted six years (1996 to 2002), but the other two only one year each (1994–95 and 2003–04). After each of the first two relegations they returned to the Premier League after only one season, but after being relegated in 2004, they were out of the top flight for ten seasons, until their promotion in 2014. In 2008, they were relegated to League One (the old Third Division) for the first time, but they were promoted back to the Championship at the first attempt. The team eventually was promoted back to the Premier League in 2013–14, making a total of five promotions and three relegations in 20 years. They remained in the Premier League since their last promotion, including winning the title in 2015–16, the first league trophy victory for Leicester, however they were once again relegated at the conclusion of the 2022–23 season, returning to the Premier League for the 2024–25 season having finished first in the Championship. Their yoyo form resumed when they suffered another relegation to the Championship in April 2025; they suffered a second relegation to League One in April 2026.

=== Manchester City ===
Founder members of the Football League Second Division in 1892, City gained promotion to the First Division for the first time in 1899. They spent 63 of the following 73 seasons in the First Division (the top tier), despite suffering relegation six times – of their six spells in the Second Division over this period, the longest was three years, from 1963 to 1966. But they were relegated twice in the 1980s, and two years after another relegation in 1996 they dropped into the Third Division (then known as the Second Division) for the first time in their history – their only season at that level, to date, being 1998–99.

City have now been back in the Premier League since 2002 and have won eight Premier League titles (2012, 2014, 2018, 2019, 2021, 2022, 2023 and 2024) in recent history. Despite their previous reputation as a yo-yo club during the erratic years of the 1980s and 1990s, only five other clubs (Everton, Aston Villa, Liverpool, Arsenal, Manchester United) have spent more than the 95 seasons Manchester City have been in the top division of English football.

=== Middlesbrough ===
Middlesbrough changed divisions 10 times in the 16 years from 1982 to 1998.

Following relegation in 1954 they had been out of the First Division for 20 years, and had dropped into the Third Division for the first time in their history (1966–67).

After regaining their First Division place in 1974 they were relegated again in 1982, and in 1986 they dropped into the Third Division again. This time they almost went out of business, but they quickly recovered and two successive promotions took them back into the First Division by 1988. They lasted only one season, and spent three more years in the Second Division before winning promotion to the newly created Premier League in 1992.

They stayed there for only one season, but regained their Premier League place two years later as First Division champions. Two years later, despite investing over £10 million in transfer fees for international players, a three-point penalty for failing to fulfil a fixture cost Boro their Premier League status. This time they regained it at the first attempt, and they held on to it for 11 years, but played seven consecutive seasons in the Championship following relegation in 2009. Middlesbrough gained promotion as Championship runners-up in the 2015–16 campaign only to suffer another relegation in the following season. They lost the May 2026 promotion playoff to Hull City, consigning Boro to its 10th consecutive season in the Championship.

=== Millwall ===
Millwall have yo-yoed between the second and third tier of English Football throughout their 92 consecutive seasons in the Football League. They have spent two seasons in the top tier, 42 in the second, 43 in the third and five in the fourth tier. They have been promoted 11 times (five as champions) and relegated 10 times. They've been promoted a record eight times from the third tier, and relegated six times from the second tier.

=== Norwich City ===
In 1971–72, Norwich City won the second tier and reached the top flight for the first time. In the next 23 seasons the club was relegated to the second tier three times (1973–74, 1980–81, 1984–85) but they always bounced back to the top flight at the first attempt (1974–75, 1981–82, 1985–86). Since being relegated in 1994–95, the club has been promoted a total of six times (2003–04, 2009–10, 2010–11, 2014–15, 2018–19, 2020–21) and relegated seven times (1994–95, 2004–05, 2008–09, 2013–14, 2015–16, 2019–20, 2021–22), with one of those seasons (2009–10) spent in the third tier.

Managers of the team that have celebrated promotion in the Premier League era are Nigel Worthington (2003–04), Paul Lambert (2009–10, 2010–11), Alex Neil (2014–15) and Daniel Farke (2018–19 and 2020–21), whereas managers in the same era suffering relegation have been Gary Megson (1994–95), Nigel Worthington (2004–05), Bryan Gunn (2008–09), Neil Adams (2013–14), Alex Neil (2015–16), Daniel Farke (2019–20) and Dean Smith (2021–22).

In 2018, Gregor Robertson, writing in The Times, described Norwich City as "the perennial yo-yo club".

=== Notts County ===
Notts County are the second most frequent yo-yo club, switching divisions a total of 29 times in their history with 13 promotions and 16 relegations.

Promotion years: 1897, 1914, 1923, 1931, 1950, 1960, 1971, 1973, 1981, 1990, 1991, 1998, 2010, 2023

Relegation years: 1893, 1913, 1920, 1926, 1930, 1935, 1958, 1959, 1964, 1984, 1985, 1992, 1995, 1997, 2004, 2015, 2019.

Notts County have spent a total of 30 seasons in the top flight of English football, all of which were in Division 1. They have never played in the Premiership, as they suffered relegation from the old First Division the season before it became the Premiership. They have spent a further 37 seasons in the second tier, 31 in the third tier, and 15 in the fourth tier. After the 2018–19 season, they dropped into the National League for the first time in their history. They got promoted back to League Two after the 2022-23 season.

=== Sheffield Wednesday ===
Prior to World War II, Sheffield Wednesday were one of England's most successful clubs; they won their fourth Football League title in 1930, and they won the FA Cup for the third time in 1935. But they were relegated to the Second Division in 1937, and after promotion in 1950 they experienced three more relegations in the next eight years: in 1951, 1955, and 1958. Each time they won promotion at the first attempt, and it was their manager Eric Taylor who referred to this period as "the yo-yo years".

After their fourth promotion in nine years, in 1959, Wednesday remained in the First Division until 1970 (and came close to winning their fourth F.A. Cup in 1966, when they lost a memorable final to Everton). But in 1975 they dropped into the Third Division for the first time, and in 2010 they began their third spell at this level. However, in May 2012, they were promoted back to the Championship. Since 1970 they have had two periods in the top flight – totaling 14 seasons – but they have never yet repeated the frequent ups and downs of the 1950s.

=== Sunderland ===
After joining the Football League in 1890, Sunderland were one of the most successful clubs in the country, winning the First Division on six occasions, the last in 1936; they also won the FA Cup on one occasion, in 1937.

In 1958, Sunderland were relegated for the first time in their history, they then spent six seasons in the second tier, gaining promotion in 1964, they were relegated in 1970 and spent a further six seasons in the Second Division; it was during this spell that Sunderland won their second FA Cup, beating Leeds United in the 1973 FA Cup Final.

Between 1976 and 1990 Sunderland yo-yoed between the top two divisions, with a one-season spell in the Third Division in 1987-88, when they were promoted back to the Second Division at the first time of asking.

In 1990, Sunderland reached the play-off final at Wembley Stadium. Despite losing the match against Swindon Town 1-0 Sunderland were promoted after Swindon were punished by the Football League for financial irregularities. The stay was short and they were relegated in 1991.

Under the management of Peter Reid, Sunderland were promoted to the Premiership in 1996; again it was a short stay, returning to the second tier in 1997.

Between 1997 and 2017, Sunderland never finished lower than third in the second tier of English Football, managing to achieve successive top 7 finishes in the Premiership 2000 and 2001 and a top 10 finish in 2011.

Sunderland spent 10 seasons in The Premier League between 2007 and 2017, when they were relegated to the Championship; one year later Sunderland were relegated to the third tier for the first time since 1987.

Recently, Sunderland have been promoted to the Premier League following a 2–1 victory over Sheffield United in the EFL Championship Play-Off Final.

In total Sunderland have been promoted ten times and relegated 11 times.

Promotion Years 1964, 1976, 1980, 1988, 1990, 1996, 1999, 2005, 2007, 2022, 2025

Relegation Years 1958, 1970, 1977, 1985, 1987, 1991, 1997, 2003, 2006, 2017, 2018

=== Watford ===
Following promotion from the Southern League at the end of the 1919–20 season, Watford spent their existence in the Football League's basement Third Division South, restructured to the Fourth Division for the 1958–59 Season, before achieving their first promotion within the Football League structure, to the Third Division, at the end of 1959–60. Watford spent nine seasons at this level before a further promotion to the Second Division at the end of 1968–69. However, their stay at this level was short-lived and they were twice relegated, at the end of the 1971–72 and 1974–75 seasons, to sink back to the Fourth Division.

Under the chairman Elton John and manager Graham Taylor, Watford achieved promotions in consecutive seasons between 1977 and 1979 to reach the Second Division once again. This was followed by three seasons at that level, culminating in achieving runners-up position in 1981–82 and promotion to the First Division.

Watford were league runners-up in their first season as a First Division club, and were FA Cup losing finalists a year later. But they were back in the Second Division come 1988–89, and slipped into the third tier of the league (by then the new Football League Division Two) at the end of the 1995–96 season. They were promoted back to Division One two years later after winning the Division Two title, and a Division One playoff triumph the following year earned them promotion to the Premiership.

Watford were unable to adjust to the pace of Premiership football and were relegated at the end of their first top-flight season in more than a decade. They won the Championship playoff in 2005–06, but last place in the Premiership the following season ensured their 11th movement in 25 seasons. After finishing runners-up in the Championship in 2014–15, Watford were promoted once again and competed in the Premier League in 2015–16. The club finished 13th, thereby maintaining Premier League status for the first time, and subsequently finished 17th, 14th and 11th in its next three Premier League seasons, while also reaching an FA Cup final. They were relegated again in the 2019–20 season, despite notching a 3–0 win over Liverpool, who had been unbeaten in league play that season and ultimately went on to win their first Premier League title. They bounced back at the first attempt, only to be relegated again at the end of the following season.

=== West Bromwich Albion ===
Since 2002, West Bromwich Albion have provided a classic example of the yo-yo. Between 2002 and 2010 they were promoted to the Premier League four times and relegated back to Division One (known since 2004 as The Championship) three times, and 2011 was the first year since 1999 that they were not involved in either a promotion or a relegation battle, in most cases right up to the last match of the season.

Albion were promoted in 2002, relegated in 2003, promoted in 2004, achieved what has become known as "The Great Escape" in 2005 when they became the first ever club to avoid relegation from the Premier League after being in bottom place at Christmas, relegated in 2006, lost the 2007 play-off final to Derby County, promoted in 2008, relegated in 2009 and promoted in 2010. They remained in the Premier League until the end of the 2017–18 season when the club was relegated to the Championship once again. Having lost to Aston Villa in the 2019 playoffs, they won automatic promotion in 2020. In 2021, they were relegated to the Championship again.

In 2000, Albion had been in real danger of relegation to Division Two right up to the last day of the season, and in 2001 they reached the Division One play-offs, losing in the semi-finals to Bolton Wanderers. Albion had also spent two years in the Third Division between 1991 and 1993, after being relegated from the top tier in 1986.

=== Wolverhampton Wanderers ===
Wolves were one of the most famous yo-yo clubs during the 1980s. They began the decade on a high by winning the League Cup in 1980, only to suffer relegation to the Second Division and narrowly avoid bankruptcy two years later. They regained their First Division status at the first attempt, only to endure successive relegations over the next few seasons and slip into the Fourth Division for the first time in 1986. Fourth Division championship glory came two years later and the following year Wolves were Third Division champions and promoted to the Second Division. During the 1980s, Wolves had moved divisions seven times in eight seasons. They have spent all but one of their 17 subsequent seasons in the league's second tier (Second Division, Division One and now the Championship), having been in the Premier League during the 2003–04 season. Wolves won the Football League Championship title in 2009, but were relegated in 2012 after three seasons in the Premier League and relegated again a year later. Wolves finally returned to the Championship at the first attempt as League One champions in 2013–14, and were promoted to the Premier League following the 2017–18 season. They went on to finish seventh on their return, which was their best performance since 1979–80, and claimed victories over four of the Big Six. Their league position was enough to qualify for the 2019–20 UEFA Europa League. Wolves finished at the foot of the Premier League table in 2025-26, condemning them to the Championship for 2026-27.

=== Overall total ===
The table below shows the total number of relegations and promotions (of select clubs) between the top four tiers of English football as of the beginning of the 2026–27 season.

In bold those who have competed in the Premier League; in italics those who have never competed in the top flight at all.

| No. | Team | Promotions | Relegations | Total |
|---|---|---|---|---|
| 1 | Grimsby Town | 15 | 17 | 32 |
| 2 | Notts County | 12 | 18 | 30 |
| 3 | **Birmingham City** | 15 | 15 | 30 |
| 4 | **Burnley** | 13 | 14 | 27 |
| = | **Cardiff City** | 14 | 13 | 27 |
| 6 | **Leicester City** | 12 | 14 | 26 |
| 7 | **Bolton Wanderers** | 10 | 13 | 23 |
| = | **Manchester City** | 12 | 11 | 23 |
| 9 | Bristol City | 11 | 11 | 22 |
| 10 | Plymouth Argyle | 10 | 12 | 22 |
| 11 | Millwall | 11 | 10 | 21 |
| = | **Barnsley** | 10 | 11 | 21 |
| = | **West Bromwich Albion** | 10 | 11 | 21 |
| = | **Sunderland** | 10 | 11 | 21 |
| 15 | **Stoke City** | 9 | 11 | 20 |
| 16 | **Middlesbrough** | 9 | 9 | 18 |
| = | **Norwich City** | 9 | 9 | 18 |
| = | **Sheffield Wednesday** | 9 | 9 | 18 |
| 19 | **Reading** | 9 | 8 | 17 |
| 20 | **Portsmouth** | 10 | 6 | 16 |
| = | **Sheffield United** | 9 | 7 | 16 |
| 22 | **Watford** | 9 | 6 | 15 |
| = | **Derby County** | 7 | 8 | 15 |

== France ==
In France, FC Metz have been noted as the club most frequently performing the ascenseur between Ligue 1 and Ligue 2 in the 21st century with, as of 2026, 15 relegations and promotions since 2002 (plus one season in the 3rd tier in 2012-2013). They are sometimes mocked as a "Ligue 1.5 team".

AS Saint-Étienne had been relegated twice to the Ligue 2 in 2021-2025 four years.

== Germany ==
Season-end position for DSC Arminia Bielefeld since the founding of the Bundesliga in 1963

In German, yo-yo clubs are referred to as Fahrstuhlmannschaften (lit. lift teams or elevator teams). 1. FC Nürnberg has been promoted or relegated 16 times between the first-tier Bundesliga and the second-tier 2. Bundesliga. Arminia Bielefeld (15 moves), VfL Bochum, Hertha BSC (both 12), Karlsruher SC and MSV Duisburg (both 11) are also considered to be yo-yo clubs in German club football, as well as Hansa Rostock (16 moves) and Union Berlin (12) if the league system in the former East Germany is included in the statistics.

More recently, SC Paderborn 07 has become a yo-yo club. In 2014, the club was promoted to the first division. In 2017, it barely avoided relegation to the fourth division. In 2019, Paderborn reached the first division once again where they were immediately relegated to the second division once again.

== Ghana ==
Bofoakwa Tano have been promoted or relegated nine times since finishing bottom in 1979. They were promoted back to the top flight in 1982, but were relegated again in 1985. The club reappeared in the top division in 1989–90, by which time the league had switched to winter. They were relegated again in 1990–91, promoted back in 1994–95, relegated in 1996–97, promoted in 1997–98. In 1999 they finished third from bottom, but avoided another relegation by winning a play-off. However, they were relegated again in 2006–07.

== Hong Kong ==
Hong Kong Football Club has won many titles in the second-tier competition in Hong Kong Soccer League history, however, they have rarely enjoyed success when playing against the professional sides in top-tier competitions. Therefore, they have the local nickname the lift (Chinese: 升降機), which is the equivalent of the term yo-yo club.

== Ireland ==
Irish club Finn Harps are known as a yo-yo club due to the regular frequency of the club's relegation and promotion to and from the League of Ireland Premier Division and the League of Ireland First Division. Drogheda United are another example of the yo-yo club as they swapped divisions every season between 1993–94 and 2000–01.

== Italy ==
Historically, yo-yo clubs between Italy's top two divisions, Serie A and Serie B, have included Cagliari, Chievo, Hellas Verona, Bari, Brescia, Empoli and Lecce. In more recent years, Frosinone, Crotone and Benevento have seen multiple promotions and relegations in successive seasons.

Empoli had been promotions and relegations in Serie A and Serie B since 2012-13 promotion to Serie A. Their last relegation is in 2024-25 Serie A.

Frosinone has been promotions and relegations in Serie A and Serie B since 2014-15 promotion to Serie A. Playing for one season (2015-16) Serie A as debutant, relegated to Serie B in 2016-18, 2019-23 at Serie B.They promoted in 2023-24 and 2026 back to Serie A.

== Netherlands ==
Dutch football club FC Volendam are known as the Heen-en-weer club (The to-and-fro club): they won promotion from the Eerste Divisie to the Eredivisie in 1959, were relegated in 1960, were promoted in 1961, were relegated in 1964, were promoted in 1967, were relegated in 1969, were promoted in 1970, were relegated in 1972, were promoted in 1977, were relegated in 1979, were promoted in 1983, were relegated in 1985, were promoted in 1987, were relegated in 1998, were promoted in 2003 and were relegated in 2004. In 2008 FC Volendam promoted once again, only to finish last and be therefore relegated the following year. For the 2009–10 season, the club is playing in the Eerste Divisie.

In the 21st Century VVV Venlo have also frequently oscillated between the top two divisions. In 2020s, SC Cambuur and Excelsior Rotterdam have also oscillated between the top two divisions.

== Norway ==
Starting in 1979 and ending in 1987, SK Brann were promoted in every odd-numbered year and relegated in every even-numbered year. This is the world record for consecutive relegations-promotions. From 2000, IK Start promoted and relegated between Eliteserien and Norwegian First Division. Since 2017, Aalesunds FK relegation and promotion between Eliteserien and Norwegian First Division. Since 2005, Skeid Fotball went between Norwegian First Division and Norwegian Second Division. From 2001, Follo FK went between Norwegian First Division to Norwegian Third Division.

From 2022, Asker FK have been experiencing 4 yo-yoing in 5 years between Norwegian Second Division to Norwegian Third Division. From 2024-2026, 3 consecutive years of yo-yoing is regarded as yo-yo-yo.

IF Fløya and FK Jerv are also yo-yo clubs in the 2020s, they both made 4 moves of promotion or relegation in 2021-2026 6 years period.

== Poland ==
The Polish club Wisła Płock is often referred to as a yo-yo club (wańka-wstańka in Polish). They were promoted to the Ekstraklasa in 1994 (known as Petrochemia Płock at the time), but were relegated after one season. Promoted again in 1997, they again were relegated after one season. Their next promotion came (after changing their name to Petro Płock) in 2000, and this time they managed to avoid relegation after one season. However, the next season (known now as Orlen Płock) they were again relegated. In 2002, reverting to the original name Wisła Płock, they were promoted to the top tier, and finally enjoyed relative stability, even reaching the Polish Cup final in 2003 and winning it in 2006. However, relegation was again in order in 2007. After that, they spent three years in the second tier before being relegated to the third in 2010. They immediately got promoted to the second tier, but got relegated from it again in 2012. They were once again promoted to the second tier the following season, spending three years in it, before finally returning to the Ekstraklasa in 2016. In spite of this "yo-yoing," Wisła have avoided the fate of other relegated clubs in Poland, such as bankruptcy (e.g. Szczakowianka Jaworzno) or further relegation to lower divisions (e.g. Sandecja Nowy Sącz).

== Scotland ==
Dunfermline currently hold the record for relegations from the top flight, experiencing demotion from this level on ten occasions (1928, 1937, 1957, 1972, 1975, 1988, 1992, 1999, 2007, 2012). The Pars have also been relegated to Scotland’s third tier on three occasions (1983, 2013, 2022) meaning they have endured 13 relegations in their history.

Dundee have been the country's foremost yo-yo club since league reconstruction in 1975, with eight relegations over this period and nine overall (1938, 1976, 1980, 1990, 1994, 2005, 2013, 2019, 2022). Falkirk have also been relegated from the country's top division nine times (1935, 1951, 1959, 1969, 1974, 1988, 1993, 1996, 2010) with 11 relegations overall including twice to the third tier, in 1977 and 2019.

Partick Thistle and Kilmarnock are the next closest competitors having both been relegated from the top flight seven times (1899, 1901, 1970, 1982, 1996, 2004, 2018; and 1947, 1973, 1975, 1977, 1981, 1983, 2021 respectively). Thistle have also experienced relegation from the second tier to the third on three occasions (1998, 2005, 2020), taking their total relegation count to ten, with Kilmarnock emulating this feat in 1989 to take their total to eight.

Other notable clubs with multiple relegations include St Johnstone, relegated six times, with five of those coming from the top league (1930, 1962, 1984, 1994, 2002) and once to the third tier (1985), and both St Mirren (1935, 1967, 1971, 1992, 2001, 2015) and Dundee United (1927, 1930, 1932, 1995, 2016, 2023) with six relegations apiece, though never from a level below the top flight.

Hearts having never been relegated prior, experienced a significant yo-yo spell in the 1970s and 1980s, demoted three times at the end and beginning of these decades and relegated five time overall (1977, 1979, 1981, 2014, 2020). Their city rivals Hibs have experienced demotion on four occasions (1931, 1980, 1998, 2014) as have Motherwell (1953, 1968, 1979, 1984).

Celtic and Aberdeen are the only clubs never to have been relegated from the top flight, though Aberdeen did finish in bottom place in season 1999–2000 only to be saved from relegation due to Falkirk not meeting the necessary stadium requirements at the time.

Stirling Albion F.C. are Scotland’s number one yo-yo club overall, winning promotion from the Second Division six times from 1949 to 1965 alone and having been relegated a record 14 times in their history since the club’s formation in 1945.

== South Korea ==
The K League 2's creation in 2013 began the promotion and relegation system for professional clubs. The first two clubs relegated, Sangju Sangmu Phoenix and Gwangju FC during the 2012 K-League season, have since become the clubs with the most and second-most promotions and relegations.

Sangju Sangmu Phoenix/Gimcheon Sangmu FC have been relegated four times, winning the K League 2 the following season each time (earning four promotions). However, two of these relegations were inflicted regardless of final position. During the 2012 season Sangju forfeited their final 14 matches after the K League Federation decided to forcibly relegate the club as they failed to obtain an AFC club license. In 2020, the club announced a move out of Sangju. Their successor club Gimcheon Sangmu would have to play in the K League 2 for the 2021 season, incurring their relegation before having played any matches. Despite this, the club finished fourth, winning 13, drawing five, and losing nine before their compulsory relegation began a streak of four consecutive oscillations between 2020 and 2023, the longest in South Korea.

Gwangju FC have been relegated and promoted three times each; relegated after finishing second to last in 2012 ahead of Sangju, last in 2017, and last in 2021, while earning promotions in 2014, 2019, and 2022, winning the K League 2 on the latter two occasions.

== Sweden ==
In Sweden the term has been used especially for Hammarby IF's men's football team but also for Katrineholms SK's men's bandy team during the early-mid 1990s. Kalmar AIK Fotboll return to 2026 Allsvenskan after 1 year absence.

Halmstads BK yoyoing between Allsvenskan and Superettan.Falkenbergs FF yoyoing among Allsvenskan, Superettan and Ettan from 2013.

== Spain ==
The club with the most promotions and relegations in Spain is Málaga C.F., with 13 of each. Other notable equipos ascensores are Deportivo La Coruña and Real Valladolid; Real Betis and Real Murcia up until the early 2010s.

== Turkey ==
In Turkey, these kinds of clubs are called asansör takım (elevator team). Karşıyaka S.K. relegated from first level in 1964, 1967, 1972, 1991, 1994 and 1996. Karşıyaka also played in third level between 1973–1980 and 2001–2003. Also Sakaryaspor has an interesting statistic. They were promoted in 1981, relegated in 1986. But they promoted again after the 1986–87 season. However they could only stay in first level for three seasons and relegated again in 1990. They came back to first level for a single season in 1998–99. They were back again in first level in 2004–05, but relegated same season. They won the 2005–06 play-offs and promoted to first level again, just to relegate after one season. They almost repeated same thing when they reached play-offs in 2007–08 but this time they lost and finally "stayed" in second level for a second season in row. Sakaryaspor later relegated to once to third level in 2008–09 season. Sakaryaspor returned second level after play-offs in the 2010–11 season but this return was brief due to money shortage. After two successive relegations between 2011 and 2013, they were placed in fourth level. all in all, Samsunspor was promoted to first level in 1969, 1976, 1982, 1985, 1991, 1993, 2011 and 2023; relegated from first level in 1975, 1979, 1983, 1990, 1992, 2006 and 2012. Samsunspor currently plays in the Süper Lig, which is first tier in the Turkish league system.

Adanaspor is one of the most yo-yoed teams. They were promoted to first league in 1971, relegated in 1984, promoted again in 1988, relegated again in 1991, promoted in 1998, relegated in 2001 and promoted to first league last in 2002. They suffered from financial difficulties between 2003–2006 and were relegated to Third League, which is fourth level of Turkish league system in 2006 after three successive relegations. They also didn't win any match at third level in the 2005–06 season. But they recovered to Bank Asya First League in 2008 after two successive promotions.

Kasımpaşa S.K. is one of the recent yo-yo clubs, having been relegated from Süper Lig in 2008 and 2011, and promoted in 2007, 2009 and 2012. They also moved to and fro between Bank Asya First League, the second tier of Turkish football, and TFF Second League, the third level, before being promoted to Süper Lig. They also played in amateur level between 1979 and 1984 and fourth level between 2001 and 2005.

Other yo-yo clubs in Turkey are below:

Mersin İdman Yurdu:

1st Level: 1967–1974, 1976–1978, 1980–1981, 1982–1983, 2011–2013, 2014–

2nd Level: 1963–1967, 1974–1976, 1978–1980, 1981–1982, 1983–2001, 2002–2006, 2009–2011, 2013–2014

3rd Level: 2001–2002, 2006–2009

Adana Demirspor

1st Level: 1960–1961 (Played home matches in Ankara), 1973–1984, 1987–1990, 1991–1992, 1994–1995

2nd Level: 1963–1973, 1984–1987, 1990–1991, 1992–1994, 1995–1999, 2002–2004, 2012–

3rd Level: 1999–2002, 2004–2012

Amateur Level: 1958–1960, 1961–1963

Antalyaspor (since 2010 as Medical Park Antalyaspor due to sponsorship agreement)

1st Level: 1982–1985, 1986–1987, 1994–2002, 2006–2007, 2008–2014

2nd Level: 1966–1982, 1985–1986, 1987–1994, 2002–2006, 2007–2008, 2014–

Diyarbakırspor (It was dissolved due to enormous unpaid debts in 2013)

1st Level: 1977–1980, 1981–1982, 1986–1987, 2001–2006, 2009–2010

2nd Level: 1976–1977, 1980–1981, 1982–1986, 1987–2001, 2006–2009, 2010–2011

3rd Level: 1968–1976, 2011–2012

4th Level: 2012–2013

Şekerspor (Also played as Şekerhilal, Etimesgut Şekerspor, Akyurt Şekerspor, Beypazarı Şekerspor and Çamlıdere Şekerspor, now is Polatlı Şekerspor)

1st Level: 1959–1963, 1964–1966, 1967–1969, 1972–1973, 1997–1998

2nd Level: 1963–1964, 1966–1967, 1969–1972, 1973–1992, 1994–1997, 1998–2003

3rd Level: 1992–1994, 2003–2005, 2006–2013

4th Level: 2005–2006, 2013–

Göztepe

1st Level: 1958–1977, 1978–1980, 1981–1982, 1999–2000, 2001–2003

2nd Level: 1977–1978, 1980–1981, 1982–1999, 2000–2001, 2003–2004, 2011–2013

3rd Level: 2004–2005, 2009–2011, 2013–

4th Level: 2005–2007, 2008–2009 (Göztepe took place of Aliağaspor in 2008)

Amateur Level: 2007–2008

Kayseri Erciyesspor (Kayserispor before 2004–2005 season)

1st Level: 1973–1975, 1979–1980, 1985–1986, 1992–1996, 1997–1998, 2005–2007, 2013–

2nd Level: 1966–1973, 1975–1979, 1980–1985, 1986–1989, 1991–1992, 1996–1997, 1998–2007, 2007–2013

3rd Level: 1989–1991

Çaykur Rizespor (Rizespor before 1990–1991 season)

1st Level: 1979–1981, 1985–1989, 2000–2002, 2003–2008, 2013–

2nd Level: 1974–1979, 1981–1985, 1989–1993, 1994–2000, 2002–2003, 2008–2013

3rd Level: 1968–1974, 1993–1994

Giresunspor

1st Level: 1971–1977

2nd Level: 1967–1971, 1977–1978, 1979–1986, 1988–1991, 1993–1995, 1997–2000, 2007–2012, 2014–

3rd Level: 1977–1978, 1986–1988, 1991–1993, 1995–1997, 2000–2001, 2005–2007, 2012–2014

4th Level: 2001–2005

Manisaspor (Before 1965 Manisa Sakaryaspor, aka Vestel Manisaspor twice)

1st Level: 2005–2008, 2009–2012

2nd Level: 1964–1978, 1980–1983, 1985–1986, 1991–1993, 1994–1995, 2002–2005, 2008–2009, 2012–

3rd Level: 1978–1980, 1984–1985, 1986–1991, 1993–1994, 1995–2002

Amateur Level: 1958–1964, 1983–1984

== Uzbekistan ==
FC Bukhara and PFC Lokomotiv Tashkent are yo-yo clubs.
