= Lincoln City F.C. =

Association football club in Lincoln, England

Lincoln City
- Full name: Lincoln City Football Club
- Nickname: The Imps
- Founded: 1884; 142 years ago
- Ground: ProAmpac Stadium
- Capacity: 11,400
- Chairman: Ron Fowler
- Head coaches: Chris Cohen & Tom Shaw
- League: EFL Championship
- 2025–26: EFL League One, 1st of 24 (promoted)
- Website: weareimps.com
Home colours	Away colours	Third colours

Lincoln City Football Club is a professional association football club based in the city of Lincoln, Lincolnshire, England. The club competes in the EFL Championship, the second tier of English football, following promotion from EFL League One.

Nicknamed the "Imps" after the legend of the Lincoln Imp, they have played at 11,400-capacity Sincil Bank since their move from John O'Gaunts in 1895. Traditionally they play in red and white striped shirts with black shorts and red and white socks. They hold rivalries with other Lincolnshire clubs, particularly Scunthorpe United and Grimsby Town. Founded in 1884, Lincoln won the Midland League in 1889–90, their first full season playing league football. They moved on from the Football Alliance to become founder members of the Football League Second Division in 1892, remaining there until they failed re-election in 1908. They won immediate re-election after winning the next year's Midland League, and would repeat this feat after failing re-election again in 1911 and 1920. Founder members of the Football League Third Division North in 1921, they won promotion as champions in 1931–32, but were relegated two seasons later. Crowned Third Division North champions again in 1947–48, they were relegated the next year, but would remain in the second tier for nine seasons after again winning the Third Division North title in 1951–52. Two successive relegations left them in the Fourth Division by 1962, where they would remain until Graham Taylor's title winning campaign of 1975–76. The Cinema Museum in London holds amateur footage of a match in 1962 with Bury.

Relegated in 1978–79, they secured promotion again two years later in the 1980–81 but suffered a double relegation to find themselves in the Conference by 1987. Lincoln made an immediate recovery however, regaining their Football League status with the Conference title in 1987–88. They were promoted again in 1997–98, but were relegated the next season. They reached the play-offs in five consecutive seasons, from 2002 to 2007, losing in the final twice (2002–03 and 2004–05) and the semi-finals three times, which is a competition record. However they exited the division at the other end when they were returned to the Conference after relegation at the end of the 2010–11 campaign. A six-season stay in non-League was ended when brothers Danny and Nick Cowley led the club to the National League title in 2016–17, as well as a run to the quarter-finals of the FA Cup – this made them the first non-League side to reach that stage in 103 years. They won the EFL Trophy in 2018, the League Two title in 2018–19 and the League One title in 2025–26.

== History ==
Chart of table positions of Lincoln City in the Football League

Football in the city of Lincoln had been prominent since the 1860s although not strictly connected to the modern day club. After the disbanding of Lincoln Rovers (formerly Lincoln Recreation) in 1884, Lincoln City FC was formed as an amateur football association, and the first game Lincoln played was an emphatic 9–1 victory over local rivals Sleaford, on 4 October 1884. Originally they played at the John O'Gaunts ground, provided by wealthy local brewer Robert Dawber.

Lincoln turned professional in the 1891–92 season, and soon helped to form what was then the Second Division in 1892–93 season, as an increasing number of clubs wished to join the Football League. Their first game in the Football League was a 4–2 away defeat to Sheffield United on 3 September 1892. Their first home game was also against Sheffield United, this time, however, Lincoln won 1–0. Due to Dawber's death in 1895, Lincoln moved from the John O'Gaunts Ground to Sincil Bank. On 2 September 1899, Lincoln became only the third club to be represented by a Black player in an English Football League game when John Walker made his debut for them in a home game against Middlesbrough.

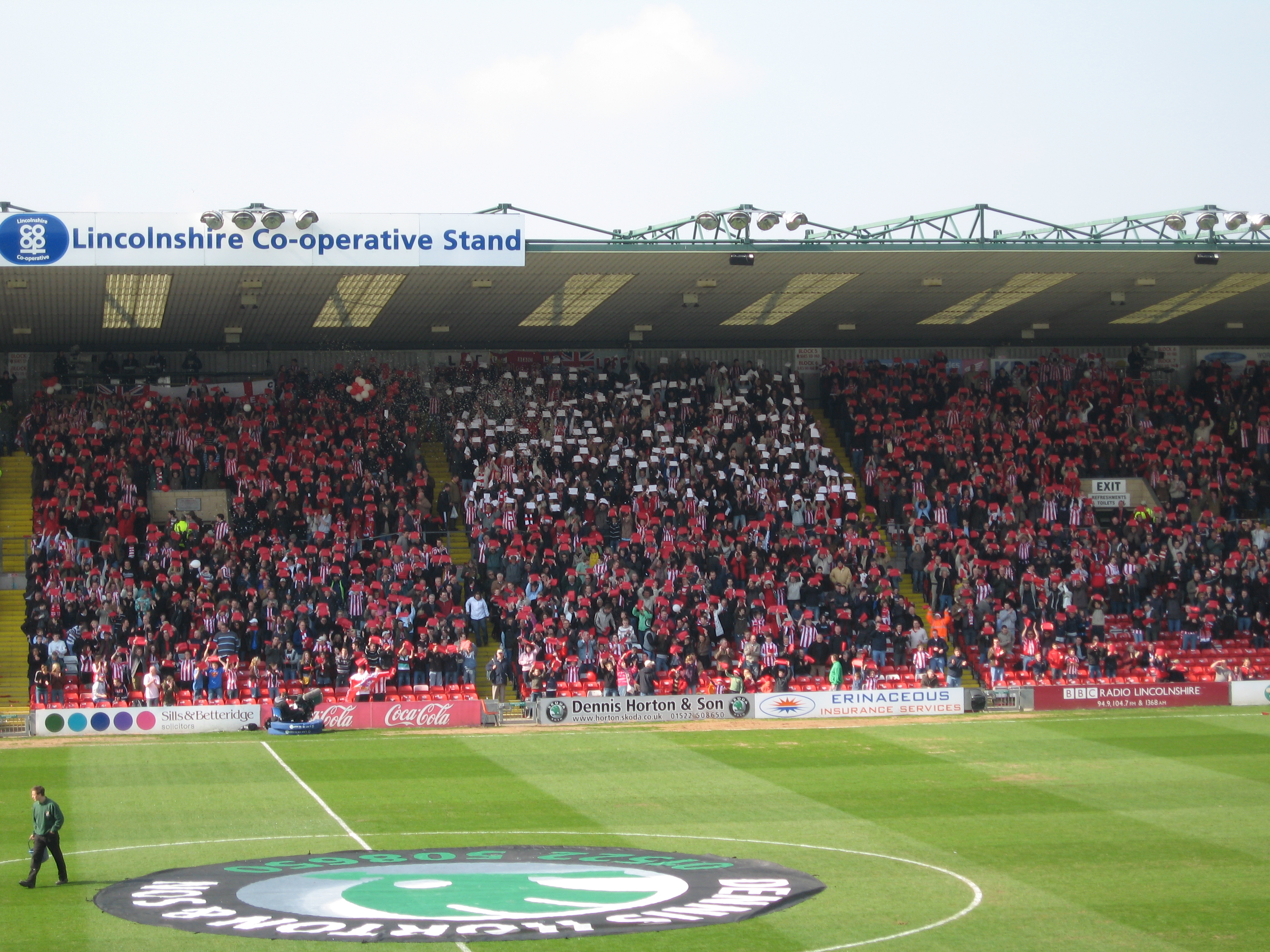
Lincoln fans do a card display before a match against Swindon

They failed re-election to the Football League in 1908. They won immediate re-election after winning the next year's Midland League, and would repeat this feat after failing re-election again in 1911 and 1920. Founder members of the Football League Third Division North in 1921, they won promotion as champions in 1931–32, but were relegated two seasons later. Crowned Third Division North champions again in 1947–48, they were relegated the next year, but would remain in the second tier for nine seasons after again winning the Third Division North title in 1951–52. Two successive relegations left them in the Fourth Division by 1962, where they would remain until Graham Taylor's title winning campaign of 1975–76. The next would oscillate between the Third and Fourth division for the next 10 years, missing out on promotion to the Second Division in 1982 and 1983.

Lincoln were relegated to the Fourth Division at the end of the 1985–86 season, and the year after that they became the first team to suffer automatic relegation from the Football League. They regained their Football League place automatically via promotion as champions of the Conference at the first attempt. In the 1997–98 season, Lincoln were promoted from the Third Division (previously the Fourth Division), but were immediately relegated back on the next season. On 3 May 2002 Lincoln entered into administration. Lincoln City were relegated again from League Two on the last day of the end of the 2010–11 season after a home defeat to Aldershot Town.

In the 2016–17 season, Lincoln City under Danny Cowley were promoted as champions back to the Football League. In the 2016–17 FA Cup, Lincoln beat Championship side Ipswich Town, and Championship leaders Brighton and Hove Albion before defeating top flight side Burnley 1–0 to reach the quarter-final, the first time a non-League club had progressed to the last eight since 1913–14. In the quarter-finals, they were defeated 5–0 at eventual Cup champions Arsenal.

In the 2017–18 season, Lincoln won the EFL Trophy by beating Shrewsbury Town 1–0 in the final in their first visit to Wembley Stadium. After an unsuccessful play-off campaign in their first season back in the EFL, Lincoln were promoted as champions at the end of the 2018–19 season.

On 5 April 2019, Lincoln announced that Nettleham Ladies FC would be rebranded as Lincoln City Women from 1 June.

On 9 September 2019, manager Danny Cowley announced his departure to join Championship side Huddersfield Town, having guided Lincoln to two promotions in his previous three seasons alongside brother and assistant manager Nicky. Due to the COVID-19 pandemic, Football League matches were suspended on 13 March 2020 with Lincoln in 15th place. Clubs voted to end the season in June 2020 with final league positions decided on a points per game basis with Lincoln subsequently being placed in 16th.

In the 2020–21 season, Lincoln finished the season in 5th place, qualifying for the play-offs. After defeating Sunderland in the semi-finals, the first match fans could attend since the start of the pandemic, Lincoln lost the play-off final to Blackpool.

Following a 2–1 win over Reading on 6 April 2026, Lincoln clinched promotion to the EFL Championship for the 2026–27 season, which will be their first appearance in the second tier of English football in 65 years. They eventually secured the 2025–26 EFL League One title with a club-record 103 points.

== Stadium ==
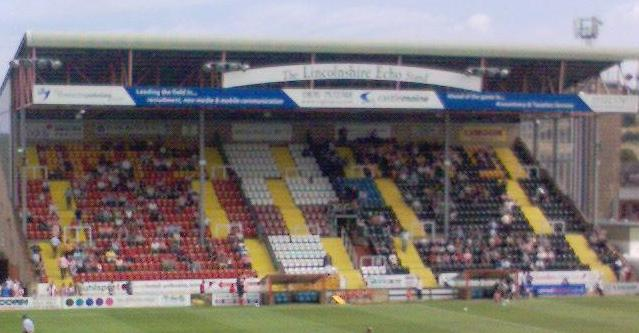
The Lincolnshire Echo Stand at Lincoln's Ground, Sincil Bank

The club have played at Sincil Bank since 1895. Previously, Lincoln City had played at the nearby John O'Gaunts ground since the club's 1884 inception. Sincil Bank has an overall capacity of 11,400 and is colloquially known to fans as "The Bank". Former Lincoln City chairman John Reames re-purchased the ground from the local council in 2000 at a cost of £175,000; the club had sold it in 1982 for £225,000 to fend off the threat of eviction, arranging a 125-year lease. In 2026, the stadium underwent a multi-million pound redevelopment as part of the “Imps Territory” project which saw the removal of the Executive Boxes in the Rilmac to host new upper-tier seating and a new elevated (up to) 500 capacity hospitality area, New red seats within the GreenLinc Renewables and Stacey West stands, a new covered fan village located behind the Rilmac Stand, a new big-screen scoreboard in the north west corner of the stadium as well as a compete facelift of the current layout giving the stadium a red and anthracite-grey theme. During this period, it increased the capacity of the stadium to 11,400.

Sincil Bank hosted England U16's 2–0 win over the Scotland U16 team in the Victory Shield on 28 November 2008. Martin Peters paraded the FIFA World Cup Trophy at the ground in March 2010 as part of its global tour. FA WSL club Lincoln Ladies played home games at Sincil Bank in their 2011 season. The Ladies' club had previously hosted Arsenal Ladies there in an FA Women's Cup semi-final in March 2008.

== Rivals ==
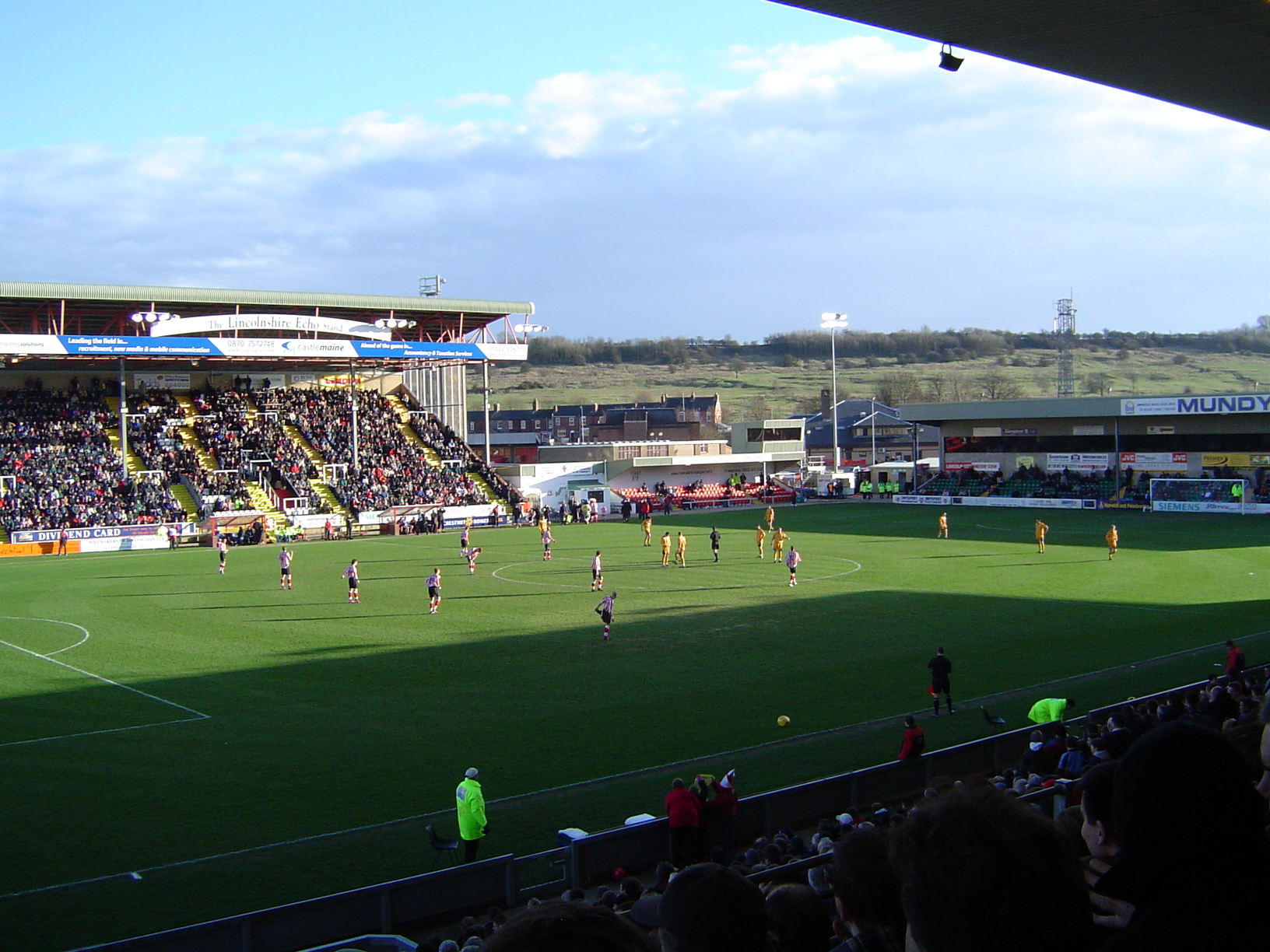
The Lincolnshire derby, between Lincoln City and local rivals Boston United, being played at Sincil Bank

Lincoln City is one of four professional football clubs in Lincolnshire. Lincoln City are a football club who find themselves with no clear and direct rival. Fans of the club consider both Grimsby Town and Scunthorpe United to be their biggest rivals. which at various points fans have considered one bigger than the other. This is largely requited by fans of those two clubs who consider each other and Hull City to be their biggest rivals, viewing their rivalry with Lincoln as more minor. Other prominent Lincolnshire rivals of the past include Gainsborough Trinity and Boston United, however, meetings between the clubs are limited nowadays due to contrasting league fortunes.

Nottinghamshire clubs Mansfield Town and Notts County are also considered rivals, and Peterborough United, Hull City and York City are clubs that have had some sort of rivalry with The Imps in the past. Lincoln United, the other football club based in Lincoln, are further down the footballing pyramid and are not a considered rival.

== Style of play and analytics ==
Since around 2024, Lincoln built a data and AI driven approach to set pieces, with chief executive Liam Scully describing artificial intelligence as a central to the club's performance work. The club worked with data analyst Chris Howarth's Insight Sport platform, which analysed more than ten million free kicks and corners to identify patterns that could raise Lincoln's set pieces conversion rate, including which zones to target, delivery type and penalty-box occupancy. This helped improve their corner conversion from roughly one goal from every 33 to about one in 16, and during their 2025-2026 League One title-winning season, Lincoln outscored Arsenal from set pieces despite Arsenal's own set piece methods attracting far greater attention.

Sporting director Jez George said pre-match reports identified opposition set piece tendencies for the coaching staff to exploit. Data scientist Metin Yarici took over development of the club's in-house data and AI models after set piece coach Scott Fry departed for Rangers and Everton's owner bought Howarth's company in 2025. Analytics also inform recruitment, with AI based tools used to identify undervalued players in overlooked markets, including Ukrainian under-21 international Ivan Varfolomeev. The approach has been credited with helping Lincoln reach the Championship for the first time in 65 years in 2026 while recording a financial loss of around £2 million during their promotion season, well below the typical loss for a promoted League One club.

== Badge and colours ==
=== Badge ===
Lincoln City currently sport a "traditional" Lincoln Imp badge, synonymous with the success of the 1970s and 1980s. The badge was returned in 2014, with general manager John Vickers billing it the start of a "new era". Between the two spells the club used two badges, the first of which being the city's heraldic shield with the letters "L.C.F.C" inscribed onto it. This badge was used until 2001, when the club used a similar design; however, it featured a yellow imp in the centre, with the nickname of "The Imps" written across.

=== Colours ===
Traditionally, the colours and design of the Lincoln City strip are a red and white striped shirt along with black shorts and red socks. This varied in the late 1960s and early 70s, the club opted to field a predominantly red strip with white shorts, and also in the 2000–01 season when the shirt was quartered red and white with white shorts. Currently, the home kit is largely red with white pinstriping down the length of the shirt, as well as black and white accents around the collar and cuff of the shirt. The shorts of the kit are also largely black, sporting red accents, and the socks red with black and white accents. Their away kit has never retained any single pattern or design, and areas varied vastly throughout the seasons, but is currently black across the shirt, shorts and socks with red accents on the edges of each piece. In recent years, the club have also released a third kit. Currently, the kit is green in colour, with a chevron pattern across it. This kit features white accents on the shirt, and white shorts with green accents.

=== Kit suppliers and shirt sponsors ===
The following tables detail the kit suppliers and sponsors of Lincoln City by year:

Period	Kit Supplier	Shirt Front Sponsor
1973–1978	Umbro	
1978–1982	Adidas	
1982–1983	Adidas	J. Arthur Bowers
1983–1985	Lowfields	F&T Tyres
1985–1987	Osca	F&T Tyres
1987–1989	Spall	F&T Tyres
1989–1990	Spall	Wheel Horse
1990–1991	Matchwinner	Pickford
1991–1992	Matchwinner	Findalls
1992–1994	Matchwinner	Lincolnshire Echo
1994–1997	Admiral	Lincolnshire Echo
1997–1998	Super League	Lincolnshire Echo
1998–1999	Super League	Alstom
1999–2001	AVEC	Alstom
2001–2003	Imps Sport	Alstom
2003–2004	Imps Sport	Siemens
2004–2006	Lincoln City Collection	The Community Solutions Group
2006–2007	Uhlsport	Starglaze
2007–2010	Umbro	Starglaze
2010–2011	Umbro	GoCar
2011–2013	Nike	TSM
2013–2015	Nike	Bishop Grosseteste University
2015–2018	Erreà	Bishop Grosseteste University
2018–2019	Erreà	NSUK Asbestos Surveys
2019–2020	Erreà	SR Hire
2020–2021	Erreà	Peregrine Holdings (Note: Peregrine Capital is a South African company co-founded by club Chairman Clive Nates)
2021–2022 (Note: For the 2021–2022 Season the Imps had five different shirt sponsors for the home kit, who featured throughout the season)	Erreà	Virgin Wines (Home 1/5); Light Source (Home 2/5); Buildbase (Home 3/5); University of Lincoln (Home 4/5); Branston Ltd (Home 5/5); SRP Hire (Away)
2022–2023	Erreà	Branston Ltd
2023–present	Oxen	Branston Ltd

== Current squad ==
=== First team ===
As of 3 September 2026

Note: Flags indicate national team as defined under FIFA eligibility rules; some limited exceptions apply. Players may hold more than one non-FIFA nationality.

No.	Pos.	Nation	Player
1	GK	ENG	George Wickens
2	DF	ZIM	Tendayi Darikwa (captain)
3	DF	ENG	Adam Reach
4	DF	ROU	Andrei Coubiș
6	DF	ENG	Ryley Towler
7	MF	LCA	Reeco Hackett
8	MF	ENG	Tom Bayliss
10	FW	IRL	Mason Melia (on loan from Tottenham Hotspur)
11	FW	DEN	Mikkel Ladefoged
14	MF	SCO	Conor McGrandles
15	DF	ENG	Sonny Bradley
16	MF	WAL	Dom Jefferies
17	FW	ENG	Rob Street
18	FW	SCO	Ben House

No.	Pos.	Nation	Player
19	FW	ENG	Tanto Olaofe (on loan from Charlton Athletic)
20	DF	AUS	Callum Elder
21	GK	ENG	Jamie Pardington
22	DF	ENG	Tom Hamer
23	DF	IRL	Josh Honohan
24	MF	UKR	Ivan Varfolomeev
25	DF	ENG	Deji Elerewe
26	MF	TUR	Yunus Konak (on loan from Brentford)
27	FW	IRL	Chiedozie Ogbene (on loan from Ipswich Town)
29	FW	ENG	Ethan Wheatley (on loan from Manchester United)
33	DF	ENG	Daniel Oyegoke
34	FW	ENG	Freddie Draper
39	DF	ENG	Charlie Parks
46	GK	AUS	Joe Gauci (on loan from Aston Villa)

==== Out on loan ====
Note: Flags indicate national team as defined under FIFA eligibility rules; some limited exceptions apply. Players may hold more than one non-FIFA nationality.

No.	Pos.	Nation	Player
9	FW	IRL	James Collins (on loan to Doncaster Rovers)
13	GK	ENG	Zach Jeacock (on loan to Northampton Town)
36	FW	USA	Zane Okoro (on loan to Tranmere Rovers)

No.	Pos.	Nation	Player
—	MF	IRL	Oisin Gallagher (on loan to Barnet)
—	FW	ENG	Oscar Thorn (on loan to Colchester United)

== Club management ==
=== Club officials ===
As of 24 July 2026

Owners:

- Lincoln City Holdings Ltd; 93.73%

Board:

- Chairman: Ron Fowler
- Vice Chairman: Jay Wright
- Chief Executive and Board Safeguarding Champion: Liam Scully
- Directors: Andrew Fowler • Harvey Jabara • David Lowes • Sean Melnick • Clive Nates • Graham Rossini
- Supporter elected director: Phil Scrafton

=== First team staff ===
As of 16 September 2026

Role	Name
Sporting Director	(England) Jez George
Head Coaches	(England) Chris Cohen (England) Tom Shaw
First Team Coaches	(Republic of Ireland) Paul McShane (England) Shaun Pearson
Goalkeeping Coach	(England) David Preece
Head of Medical	(England) Kieran Walker
Physiotherapist	(England) Andrew Cant
Head of Performance	(England) Josh Snowden
Sport Scientist	(England) Harry Rossington
Lead Sports Therapist	(England) Tom Hallas
Head of Recruitment	(England) Joe Hutchinson
Head of Performance Analysis	(England) Mason Cook
Analyst	(England) George Bush
Kit and Equipment Manager	(England) Arlen Newton
Head of Football Operations	(England) Adam Thurston
Head of Football Admin	(England) Matt Murgett
Data Scientist	(England) Mertin Yarici

== Former players and managers ==
=== Former players ===
A list of former players can be found at List of Lincoln City F.C. players.

=== Notable managers ===
Only managers with over 200 games in charge are included. For the complete list see List of Lincoln City F.C. managers.

Name	Nat	From	To	Record				
Name	Nat	From	To	P	W	D	L	Win%
David Calderhead	(Scotland)	1 August 1900	1 August 1909	256	89	53	114	44.77%
Harry Parkes	(England)	1 May 1927	1 May 1936	395	187	78	130	47.34%
Bill Anderson	(England)	1 January 1946	1 January 1965	855	307	189	359	35.91%
Graham Taylor	(England)	6 December 1972	20 June 1977	211	97	61	53	45.97%
Colin Murphy	(England)	6 November 1978	1 May 1985	309	121	88	100	39.16%
Keith Alexander	(Saint Lucia)	5 May 2002	24 May 2006	213	81	69	63	38.03%

== Honours ==
Lincoln City's honours include:

=== League ===
- Third Division North / League One (level 3)
  - Champions: 1931–32, 1947–48, 1951–52, 2025–26
  - Runners-up: 1927–28, 1930–31, 1936–37
- Fourth Division / Third Division / League Two (level 4)
  - Champions: 1975–76, 2018–19
  - Runners-up: 1980–81
  - Promoted: 1997–98
- Football Conference / National League (level 5)
  - Champions: 1987–88, 2016–17
- Midland League / Central League
  - Champions: 1889–90, 1908–09, 1911–12^{5}, 1920–21
  - Runners-up: 1932–33

=== Cup ===
- Football League / EFL Trophy
  - Winners: 2017–18
  - Runners-up: 1982–83
- Conference Championship Shield
  - Winners: 1988

Minor

- Lincolnshire Senior Cup
  - Winners (38): 1886–87, 1890–91, 1891–92, 1893–94, 1907–08, 1909–10, 1911–12, 1913–14, 1914–15, 1919–20, 1921–22, 1923–24, 1925–26, 1926–27, 1930–31, 1931–32, 1933–34, 1934–35, 1945–46, 1947–48, 1948–49, 1950–51, 1955–56^{6}, 1961–62, 1963–64^{6}, 1965–66^{6}, 1966–67, 1968–69, 1969–70, 1974–75, 1980–81, 1981–82, 1984–85, 1990–91, 1997–98, 2004–05, 2006–07, 2009–10, 2013–14
  - Runners-up (32): 1892–93, 1894–95, 1896–97, 1900–01, 1902–03, 1903–04, 1908–09, 1912–13, 1920–21, 1922–23, 1925–26, 1927–28, 1928–29, 1929–30, 1932–33, 1935–36, 1936–37, 1937–38, 1946–47, 1949–50, 1951–52, 1954–55, 1958–59, 1959–60, 1976–77, 1978–79, 1985–86, 2007–08, 2009–10, 2010–11, 2011–12, 2014–15
- Pontin's Reserve League Cup
  - Winners: 2006–07
- Fred Green Memorial Trophy^{3}
  - Winners: 2006–07
- John Reames Memorial Trophy
  - Winners: 2013–14

=== Club records ===
- Highest league finish: 5th in Second Division (level 2), 1901–02
- Best FA Cup performance: Quarter-finals, 2016–17
- Best League Cup performance: Fourth round, 1967–68, 2022–23
- Longest unbeaten run: 29 games – 29 November 2025 to 2 May 2026
- Record league attendance: 23,146 vs. Grimsby Town, 5 March 1949
- Record cup attendance: 23,196 vs. Derby County, 15 November 1967
- Record transfer fee paid: Mikkel Ladefoged– £4,300,000 to Västerås SK, 2026
- Record transfer fee received: Jack Moylan – £3,000,000 from Cardiff City, 2026
- Record league victory: 11–1 v. Crewe Alexandra (Home), Football League, 29 September 1951
- Record appearances: Grant Brown – 469
- Record goal scorer: Andy Graver – 143 (1950–55, 1958–61)
- Record goals in one season: Allan Hall – 45 (1931–32)
- Youngest player: Shane Nicholson – 16 years and 112 days v. Charlton Athletic, 23 September 1986, League Cup
- Oldest player: Albert Iremonger – 42 years and 312 days v. Doncaster Rovers, 23 April 1927, Football League
