= 1957–58 Newport County A.F.C. season =

Welsh association football club season

Newport County
1957–58 season
- Manager: Billy Lucas
- Stadium: Somerton Park
- Third Division South: 11th
- FA Cup: 1st round
- Welsh Cup: 5th round
- Top goalscorer: League: Harris (18); All: Harris (18)
- Highest home attendance: 10,680 vs Plymouth Argyle (25 December 1957)
- Lowest home attendance: 4,118 vs Crystal Palace (5 April 1958)
- Average home league attendance: 7,199
Home colours	Away colours

The 1957–58 season was Newport County's 30th season in the Football League and the last season in the Third Division South before the regional third divisions were consolidated into new Third and Fourth Divisions. County's 11th-place finish qualified them for next season's Third Division.

== Season review ==
=== Results summary ===
Overall								Home						Away					
Pld	W	D	L	GF	GA	GAv	Pts	W	D	L	GF	GA	Pts	W	D	L	GF	GA	Pts
46	17	14	15	73	67	1.09	48	12	6	5	40	24	30	5	8	10	33	43	18

Source: rsssf.com

=== Results by round ===
Round	1	2	3	4	5	6	7	8	9	10	11	12	13	14	15	16	17	18	19	20	21	22	23	24	25	26	27	28	29	30	31	32	33	34	35	36	37	38	39	40	41	42	43	44	45	46
Ground	A	H	H	A	A	H	H	A	A	H	A	A	A	A	H	H	A	H	A	H	H	H	H	A	A	H	H	A	H	A	H	H	A	H	H	A	H	A	A	H	H	A	A	H	A	A
Result	L	D	L	W	W	W	D	L	D	W	D	L	D	W	D	W	D	W	L	D	W	W	L	L	W	D	W	W	W	D	L	W	L	W	L	D	L	L	L	D	W	D	L	W	L	D
Position	17	19	22	16	13	10	9	13	13	15	10	14	17	17	12	10	10	7	9	10	8	8	10	12	11	9	7	6	5	4	6	5	7	6	6	8	8	8	9	10	10	8	10	10	11	10

Updated to match(es) played on 26 Apr 1958. Source: statto.com
A = Away; H = Home; W = Win; D = Draw; L = Loss

== Fixtures and results ==
=== Third Division South ===
Date	Opponents	Venue	Result	Scorers	Attendance
24 Aug 1957	Swindon Town	A	0–4		14,396
29 Aug 1957	Coventry City	H	2–2	Harris, Brown	10,654
31 Aug 1957	Millwall	H	1–2	McSeveney	9,320
2 Sep 1957	Coventry City	A	2–1	O'Halloran, P.Thomas	14,759
7 Sep 1957	Gillingham	A	1–0	Sherwood	8,709
12 Sep 1957	Walsall	H	2–0	Sheppeard 2	7,700
14 Sep 1957	Exeter City	H	0–0		9,213
19 Sep 1957	Walsall	A	0–3		7,688
21 Sep 1957	Queens Park Rangers	A	1–1	Harris	9,065
28 Sep 1957	Southend United	H	1–0	Harris	8,203
30 Sep 1957	Port Vale	A	2–2	Terry, Harris	8,659
5 Oct 1957	Brighton & Hove Albion	A	3–5	Terry, Harris, Graham	14,560
12 Oct 1957	Shrewsbury Town	A	1–1	Harris	6,408
26 Oct 1957	Northampton Town	A	3–0	O'Halloran, Harris, McSeveney	7,953
28 Oct 1957	Reading	H	0–0		5,048
2 Nov 1957	Watford	H	2–1	Sherwwod, McSeveney	8,212
9 Nov 1957	Crystal Palace	A	2–2	Terry, McSeveney	11,082
11 Nov 1957	Port Vale	H	2–1	McSeveney, Rodger	8,480
23 Nov 1957	Brentford	A	1–2	Brown	13,600
30 Nov 1957	Colchester United	H	2–2	Harris, Dixon	8,866
14 Dec 1957	Bournemouth & Boscombe Athletic	H	3–1	Terry 2, Brown	5,469
21 Dec 1957	Swindon Town	H	4–1	Terry 2, Sherwood, Harris	7,815
25 Dec 1957	Plymouth Argyle	H	0–2		10,680
26 Dec 1957	Plymouth Argyle	A	0–1		25,936
28 Dec 1957	Millwall	A	2–1	Terry 2	9,894
4 Jan 1958	Southampton	H	1–1	Brown	5,117
11 Jan 1958	Gillingham	H	5–0	Terry 2, McSeveney, Brown, Harris	6,206
18 Jan 1958	Exeter City	A	2–0	Dixon, Harris	7,471
1 Feb 1958	Queens Park Rangers	H	4–2	Terry 2, Harris, Brown	7,543
8 Feb 1958	Southend United	A	1–1	Terry	10,093
15 Feb 1958	Brighton & Hove Albion	H	1–2	Terry	9,424
22 Feb 1958	Shrewsbury Town	H	2–0	Dixon, Graham	6,268
1 Mar 1958	Reading	A	0–1		15,798
6 Mar 1958	Torquay United	H	3–2	McSeveney 2, Harris	3,200
8 Mar 1958	Northampton Town	H	0–1		6,800
15 Mar 1958	Watford	A	2–2	Dixon, McSeveney	7,029
22 Mar 1958	Brentford	H	1–2	Dixon	5,621
29 Mar 1958	Bournemouth & Boscombe Athletic	A	3–4	Harris, McSeveney, Shergold	11,496
4 Apr 1958	Aldershot	A	1–2	Singer	4,665
5 Apr 1958	Crystal Palace	H	0–0		4,118
7 Apr 1958	Aldershot	H	3–2	Singer 2, McSeveney	5,555
12 Apr 1958	Colchester United	A	1–1	Harris	7,472
16 Apr 1958	Norwich City	A	2–5	Harris, McSeveney	19,486
19 Apr 1958	Norwich City	H	1–0	McSeveney	6,081
23 Apr 1958	Southampton	A	1–2	Harris	12,925
26 Apr 1958	Torquay United	A	2–2	Harris, McSeveney	5,685

=== FA Cup ===
Round	Date	Opponents	Venue	Result	Scorers	Attendance
1	16 Nov 1957	Northampton Town	A	0–3		9,345

=== Welsh Cup ===
Round	Date	Opponents	Venue	Result	Scorers	Attendance
5	30 Jan 1958	Swansea Town	H	2–5	Terry, McSeveney	3,500

== League table ==
Pos	Team	Pld	W	D	L	GF	GA	GAv	Pts	Promotion or relegation
9	Bournemouth & Boscombe Athletic	46	21	9	16	81	74	1.095	51	Qualification for the Third Division
10	Queens Park Rangers	46	18	14	14	64	65	0.985	50	Qualification for the Third Division
11	Newport County	46	17	14	15	73	67	1.090	48	Qualification for the Third Division
12	Colchester United	46	17	13	16	77	79	0.975	47	Qualification for the Third Division
13	Northampton Town (R)	46	19	6	21	87	79	1.101	44	Relegation to the Fourth Division

(R) Relegated
