= Joe McClelland =

English football manager (1885–1964)

Joseph Bentley McClelland (20 April 1885 – 3 July 1964) was an English football manager who was the first manager of Halifax Town. He also managed Lincoln City and was assistant manager at Sheffield Wednesday.

== Life and career ==
McClelland was born on 20 April 1885 in Halifax, which was then in the West Riding of Yorkshire. He played local football for Halifax Trinity as a youth and in 1902, at the age of 17, became secretary of the Halifax & District Association League, a post he held for ten years. He addressed a meeting on 23 May 1911 at the Saddle Hotel in Halifax that brought about the birth of Halifax Town A.F.C.

McClelland was appointed to the dual role of club secretary and team manager. During his first season in charge at Halifax the club finished in a respectable 7th place in the Yorkshire Combination, and they were elected to an expanded Midland League for 1912–13. McClelland led his team to the first round proper of that season's FA Cup, in which Halifax were drawn at home to Southern League champions Queens Park Rangers. The opponents offered Halifax £200 plus half the gate receipts to switch the fixture to their own ground, an offer which McClelland and the club could not refuse, and QPR won the match 4–2. He found it necessary to add himself to the team sheet on more than one occasion. His first appearance came on 8 February 1913 in a 0–0 draw away to Hull City Reserves, and he played several more times after the outbreak of the First World War before the club closed down in 1916 for the duration.

When the club reformed in 1919, McClelland resumed his position. He was active in the lobbying process that preceded Halifax's election to the newly formed Football League Third Division North in 1921, and equally active in persuading the corporation to allow the club use of the land on which they built a new stadium at The Shay. The team had to apply for re-election in their first season in the Football League, and McClelland had to develop and then sell players to keep going. He led them to the last 32 of the 1923–24 FA Cup, in which they took First Division club Manchester City to two replays before going out, and fifth- and fourth-place league finishes in 1926 and 1927, but after a second application for re-election in 1930, McClelland resigned. With almost 20 years at the helm, he remains the longest serving manager in the club's history.

A year later, he was appointed assistant to Bob Brown, the manager of Sheffield Wednesday. When Brown retired for health reasons in September 1933, McClelland acted as caretaker until the appointment of Billy Walker in December, when his role became purely a secretarial one.

McClelland was appointed manager of Third Division North club Lincoln City in June 1936. In the final match of the 1936–37 season, Lincoln were at home to Stockport County; the winner would be promoted. Lincoln lost, and finished as runners-up. McClelland remained in post throughout the war years and for the first post-war campaign before the club appointed his assistant, Bill Anderson, as team manager in July 1947. McClelland stayed on as secretary for two years before retiring, and was rewarded with a benefit match, between Lincoln City and his Select XI, which attracted 13,000 spectators.

He remained in the Lincoln area, where he worked for Ruston & Hornsby, scouted for Halifax Town, and served on the committee of the Lincolnshire Football League. He died in the city in 1964 at the age of 79.

== Managerial career ==
Club	Period	Games	Wins	Draws	Losses
Halifax Town	05/1911 – 06/1930	669	261	145	263
