= Bill Anderson (English footballer) =

English footballer and manager

Personal information
- Full name: William Anderson
- Date of birth: 12 January 1913
- Place of birth: High Westwood, England
- Date of death: 19 February 1986 (aged 73)
- Place of death: Radcliffe-on-Trent, England
- Position: Left back

Senior career*
Years	Team	Apps	(Gls)
- Medomsley Juniors
1931–1932	Nottingham Forest	0	(0)
- Chopwell Institute
1933–1935	Sheffield United	23	(0)
1935	Barnsley	14	(0)
	Hartlepools United	0	(0)
Total		37	(0)

Managerial career
- 1946–1965: Lincoln City
- * Club domestic league appearances and goals

William Anderson (12 January 1913 – 19 February 1986) was the manager of Lincoln City from 1946 to 1965. He led the club to the Third Division North title in 1947–48 and 1951–52, as well as twelve Lincolnshire Senior Cup finals. As a player he appeared for Nottingham Forest, Sheffield United and Barnsley before an injury at Oakwell forced him to retire in November 1935. He came out of retirement to join Bradford (Park Avenue) in March 1938, but in two months at Park Avenue failed to break into the senior side and was released.

== Management career ==
Anderson led the "Imps" to the Third Division North title in 1947–48 after spending just £2,000 building his team. His cause was greatly helped by the division's top scorer Jimmy Hutchinson, who hit 32 of Lincoln's 81 goals. Promotion was secured on the final day at Sincil Bank with a victory over Hartlepools United. However they were immediately relegated in 1948–49 after finishing bottom of the Second Division, some seven points behind second-from-bottom Nottingham Forest.

They were four points short of promotion in 1949–50, before a fifth-place finish in 1950–51. Promotion was secured in 1951–52 though, as Lincoln finished three points ahead of Grimsby Town, scoring 121 goals in the process, 39 of which came from £5,000 Newcastle United signing Andy Graver. The "Imps" remained in the second tier for the next nine seasons, with Graver (club record goalscorer) and Tony Emery (club record league appearance holder) being key players. The 1957–58 campaign would be a particularly memorable one, as Lincoln won their last six games of the season to go from 19 points to 31 points, just one ahead of relegated Notts County.

The club's unlikely success in maintaining second tier status came to a close in 1960–61, despite the best efforts of top scorer Roy Chapman, as Lincoln finished in last place, some nine points behind Portsmouth. A second successive relegation came in 1961–62, as Lincoln dropped from the Third Division into the Fourth Division. The fall was completed in 1962–63, as Lincoln finished third-from-bottom in the Football League. Anderson departed in 1965, after 855 games in charge.

== Honours ==
with Lincoln City

- Football League Third Division North championship: 1947–48 & 1951–52
- Lincolnshire Senior Cup winners: 1948, 1949, 1951, 1956 (shared), 1962 & 1964 (shared)
- Lincolnshire Senior Cup runner-up: 1947, 1950, 1952, 1955, 1959 & 1960

== Career statistics ==
=== Playing career ===
Appearances and goals by club, season and competition
Club	Season	League			FA Cup		Other		Total	
Club	Season	Division	Apps	Goals	Apps	Goals	Apps	Goals	Apps	Goals
Sheffield United	1933–34	Division One	7	0	0	0	1 (Note: Appearances in Sheffield & Hallamshire County Cup)	0	8	0
Sheffield United	1934–35	Division Two	16	0	1	0	2	0	19	0
Sheffield United	Total		23	0	1	0	3	0	27	0
Barnsley	1935–36	Division Two	14	0	0	0			14	0
Career total			37	0	1	0	3	0	41	0

=== Managerial statistics ===
Managerial record by team and tenure
Team	From	To	Record				
Team	From	To	P	W	D	L	Win %
Lincoln City	1 January 1946	1 January 1965	855	307	189	359	35.9
Total			855	307	189	359	35.9
