= Sincil Bank =

Football stadium in Lincoln, England

Coordinates: 53°13′6″N 0°32′27″W

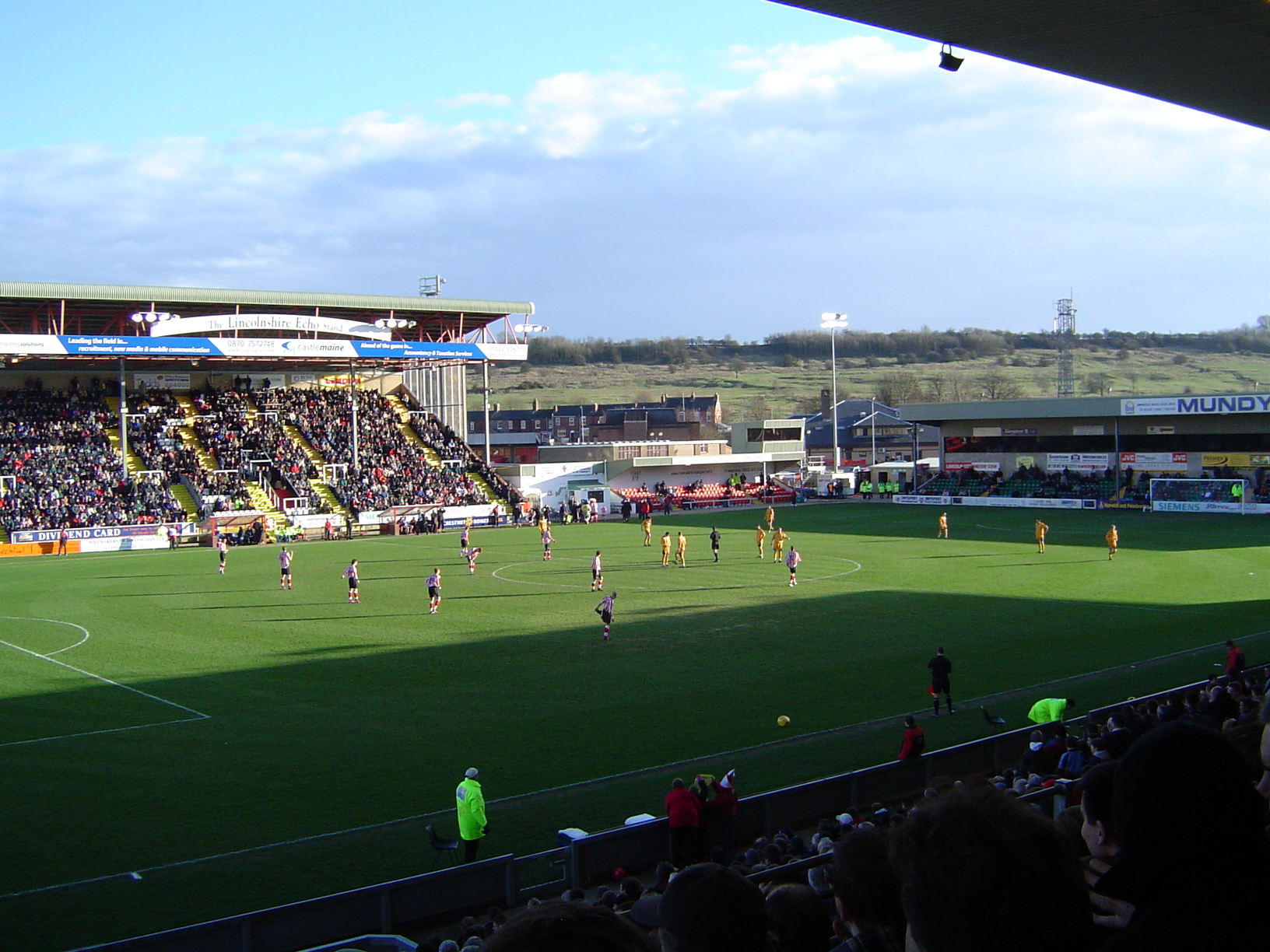
- Interactive map of Sincil Bank
- Full name: ProAmpac Stadium
- Location: Sincil Bank; Lincoln; LN5 8LD
- Owner: Lincoln City Football Club
- Capacity: 11,400
- Surface: Grass
- Field size: 110 x 73 yards
- Public transit: Lincoln (1.1 mi)

Construction
- Built: 1894
- Opened: 1895
- Renovated: May 1999

Tenant
- Lincoln City (1895–present)

Sincil Bank Stadium, known for sponsorship reasons as ProAmpac Stadium, is a football stadium in Lincoln, England, which has been the home of Lincoln City since 1895. Previously, Lincoln City had played at the nearby John O'Gaunts ground since the club's inception in 1884. The stadium has an overall capacity of 11,400. It is overlooked by Lincoln Cathedral. Former Lincoln City chairman John Reames re-purchased the ground from the local council in 2000 at a cost of £175,000. The club had sold it in 1982 for £225,000 in order to fend off the threat of eviction, arranging a 125-year lease.

On 28 November 2008, the stadium hosted England U16s' 2–0 win over Scotland U16s to win the Victory Shield, an annual football competition among the four Home Nations at the Under 16 level. Martin Peters paraded the FIFA World Cup Trophy at the ground in March 2010 as part of its global tour.

Sincil Bank was renamed the LNER Stadium in December 2019, initially on a three-year partnership. This lasted until 2026, when Lincoln were promoted to the Championship and the club and sponsor parted ways. The stadium had previously been renamed in 2012 and 2013. On 7 July 2026, it was named the ProAmpac Stadium, after ProAmpac signed a 10-year naming rights deal.

== Stands ==
=== The GBM Stand ===
The largest stand at the stadium holds approximately 5,700 people. It is located on the Sincil Bank street side of the ground and is home to the majority of the Imps' supporters. The block nearest the Bridge McFarland/South Park stand was given to visiting supporters until 2013, but is now used only for home supporters. The lower block closest the South Park Stand has now been made a family seating area as the old family stand now takes visiting fans. That side of the ground had been occupied by uncovered terracing ever since the club moved from their first home, the John O'Gaunt's Ground, in 1895. The terracing was cordoned off in August 1994 and demolition work soon began. The stand was officially opened on 4 March 1995, before Lincoln City's match with Hartlepool United. The stand cost around £1 million and meant that the stadium had been completely redeveloped from its state in the 1980s, at a total cost of £3 million.

Over the years the stand has been known under three different names, depending on sponsorship contracts. It was first known as the Linpave Stand and, in 1998, was sponsored by Simons Construction. It was renamed the Lincolnshire Co-operative stand in 2001, but it was more commonly known as the Co-op stand. That was changed to the GBM Stand for the 2022 season. The stand was home to the LCFC band, which was originally assembled in 1995 by former manager John Beck to increase matchday atmosphere.

=== St Andrews/Greenlinc Renewables Stand ===
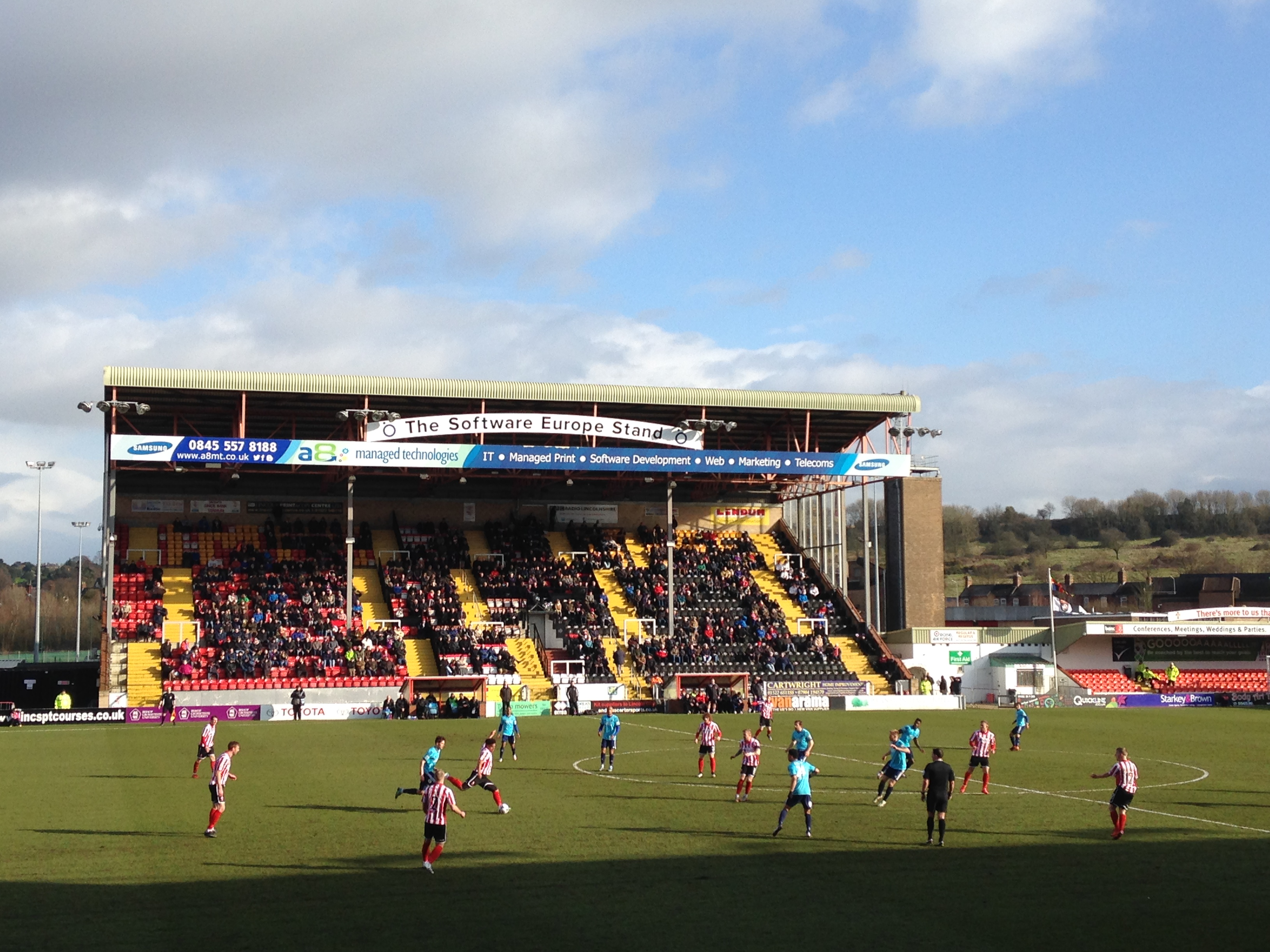
The Greenlinc Renewables Stand at Lincoln City's LNER stadium

Constructed in 1987, the structure replaced the old St Andrews Stand, which was named after the street that runs all the way from Lincoln city centre to the stadium. The old stand was constructed in 1932, replacing a smaller predecessor, and was made out of timber. It had a total capacity of 2,250, in a seated enclosure and a small bank of terracing at the front. By the mid-1980s, however, the entire stadium was in a state of disrepair and a renovation project began when the stand was demolished in the close season of 1986.

The new stand opened in November 1987 but was smaller in size than originally envisaged, partly due to City's relegation to the Conference. Running only half the length of the pitch, it has a capacity of 1,700 and holds the press box and Directors' enclosure. This is in addition to the majority of the club's offices and corporate areas.

For the 2024-25 season and onwards, the stand was renamed the Greenlinc Renewables Stand in a multi year deal.

=== Stacey-West Stand ===
This was the traditional home end up until 2013 but now takes visiting fans who bring large numbers of supporters. Built in 1990, the Stacey-West Stand is named after two lifelong supporters, Bill Stacey and Jim West, who died in the Bradford City stadium fire in 1985. It replaced the old Railway End terrace in 1990 which had a goods rail line running behind the enclosure until the line was lifted in the early 1990s. The Stacey-West Stand first had areas of terracing at either end with a large area of seating in between so that supporters had the choice of sitting or standing at games.

However, when City were promoted to the old Division Two at the end of the 1997–98 season, the stand was renovated to be entirely terraced. That was because a number of large clubs then in Division Two, such as Manchester City, Stoke City and Burnley, were expected to bring large travelling support to the ground. That convinced the club that the Stacey-West Stand should hold visiting fans, rather than a portion of the Co-op Stand. However, when the club was relegated back to the old Division Three in May 1999, a grant by the Football Trust partially enabled just under 2,000 seats to replace the Stacey-West Stand terracing which meant that, for the first time in the stadium's history, it was an all-seater stadium.

The stand continued to house visiting supporters until it was given back to home fans in the 2002 close season. But at the start of 2013/14 season it was announced that the stand would no longer be housing home supporters but only used as an away end for large quantities of supporters. As of 2016 the stand is used for home fans on certain games.

=== Rilmac Stand ===
Named as part of a two-year sponsorship with GoCar motor dealership in 2009. Previously named the I.M.P.S. Stand since 2003 when local company Industrial Marine Power Services signed a sponsorship agreement with the club. The stand was built in 1992 and houses 17 executive boxes, Strikers bar for supporters and companies using the executive boxes and the Centre Spot, a fans' bar that welcomes both home and away supporters on matchdays. It replaced the old South Park stand, which consisted of a small seated area and a terrace.

Visiting supporters sit in half of the Bridge McFarland Stand and the Family Stand. If a large away crowd is expected, the Stacey West Stand is used to accommodate away fans instead. Ahead of the 2022/23 season, the Imps announced that local business Rilmac had become sponsors of the stand, replacing Kryptocloud after two seasons holding the naming rights.

=== Poacher's Corner ===
The Family Stand was built in 1994. It is situated to the west of the St Andrew's/SRP Stand, nearest the Bridge McFarland/South Park Stand and is directly adjacent to the players' tunnel. The land on which it was built was previously occupied by a small, open terrace. When the Family Stand was built, a new building – which incorporates the club's dressing rooms and treatment areas – was also erected. On top of the stand there is a police control box, which is used to keep a close watch on all areas of the crowd. City supporters can pay to sit in this stand, although much of it is often given over to children from local schools who are invited to watch the Imps as part of the club's Football in the Community programme.

Since mid-2008 the stand has been known as "Poacher's Corner", a reference to Imps mascot Poacher the Imp. The Poacher's Club initiative by Lincoln saw cheap ticket deals and other incentives offered to any parent/child combination, and Poacher's Corner became the focal point of the efforts.

At the start of the 2011–12 season, Lincoln City signed a sponsorship deal with Network Telecom Rentals Ltd, changing the stand's name to the 'NTR Family Stand'. As of 2013 this stand and half of the Bridge McFarland Stand is used for visiting supporters.

For the 2016–17 season the stand has been part of the University of Lincoln partnership, and through the "Uni Imps" scheme offers students and staff the chance to attend matches.

== Other sports and concerts ==
In 1958 the ground played host to a visit from Queen Elizabeth II. A major rock concert was staged at the ground in May 1966 which featured the Who, the Kinks, the Yardbirds and the Small Faces among others. The facility has played host to many sports including local cricket finals, boxing, wrestling, athletics, cycling, lawn tennis, and American football.

On the weekend of 19/20 May 2006, the Irish pop band Westlife and other supporting acts, including Liberty X, Blue's Lee Ryan, and Journey South, performed in front of over 13,000 fans, the biggest concert ever to take place in the city of Lincoln. The event was organised by both Lincoln City and the City Council, with funding and profits being shared between the two. Although the event recorded a £44,000 loss, the football club claimed that the venue had been "put back on the map" for future live events. Since a Bonfire Night 2006 live event has been held, and though on a much smaller scale (over 5,000 spectators), it featured several artists such as Lee Ryan again, former Steps star Lisa Scott-Lee's brother Andy Scott-Lee, Icelandic outfit Nylon, and 2ToGo of X-Factor fame.

== Future of the stadium ==
In February 2026, the club announced plans to improve the ground by adding a new event and hospitality space behind the Rilmac stand, and relocating and improving the fan village area.

== See also ==
- Lists of stadiums
- List of football stadiums in England
