= John Reames =

English football manager and administrator

Personal information
- Full name: Keith John Reames
- Date of birth: 19 February 1942
- Place of birth: Lincoln, England
- Date of death: 6 May 2008 (aged 66)
- Place of death: Lincoln, England

Managerial career
- Years: Team
- 1998–2000: Lincoln City

Keith John Reames (19 February 1942 – 6 May 2008) was an English football manager and administrator who was chairman of Lincoln City from 1985 to 2000. He remains, to date, their longest-serving chairman; he also managed the club from 1998 to 2000.

Reames also held high positions within the Football Association (FA) and Football League during the 1990s (chairman of the FA Referees Committee and director of the Football League).

== Lincoln City ==
=== As chairman ===
Reames was chairman of Lincoln City for 15 years, from 1985 to 2000, and remains to date their longest-serving chairman. After Lincoln City had sold their ground to the local council in 1982 for £225,000, Reames bought it back from the council in 2000, ensuring the existence and continuity of Lincoln City as a viable professional football club and business.

Reames also oversaw the complete rebuilding of Sincil Bank, and guided Lincoln back to the Football League in 1988. He was also responsible for appointing the first full-time black professional manager in the Football League in Keith Alexander (1993).

Upon resigning as chairman of Lincoln City in November 2000, Reames left £400,000 in trust for the club's future.

=== As manager ===
Reames also managed Lincoln from November 1998 to March 2000, winning 25 out of 75 Football League games. Reames' managerial achievements include winning the October 1999 Manager of the Month Award.

== Later career ==
After leaving Lincoln, Reames was also chairman of Gainsborough Trinity, and managing director of Wrexham.

== Death ==
Reames died on 6 May 2008 from cancer. He left behind a wife and five children, two sons and three daughters.
