= Roy McDonald (footballer) =

Welsh footballer (1896–1970)

Personal information
- Full name: Robert William McDonald
- Date of birth: 11 July 1896
- Place of birth: Penarth, Wales
- Date of death: 1970 (aged 73–74)
- Position: Inside left

Senior career*
Years	Team	Apps	(Gls)
- Lovell's Athletic
- Barry
1922	Newport County	9	(1)
- Lovell's Athletic

International career
1923	Wales Amateurs	1	(0)

Managerial career
- Lovell's Athletic
- * Club domestic league appearances and goals

Robert William McDonald (11 July 1896 – 1970) was a Welsh amateur footballer who played in the Football League for Newport County as an inside left. He was capped by Wales at amateur level and later managed Lovell's Athletic.

== Honours ==
Lovell's Athletic

- Welsh Cup: 1947–48
