= Harry Parkes (footballer, born 1888) =

English footballer and manager

Personal information
- Full name: Harold Arnold Parkes
- Date of birth: September 1888
- Place of birth: Halesowen, England
- Date of death: 11 March 1947 (aged 58)
- Place of death: Basford, England
- Height: 5 ft 8 in (1.73 m)
- Position: Outside right

Senior career*
Years	Team	Apps	(Gls)
- Halesowen Amateurs
- Coombs Wood
- Halesowen
1906–1908	West Bromwich Albion	19	(4)
1908–1914	Coventry City		
1914–19??	West Bromwich Albion	8	(0)
1920	Newport County	1	(0)

Managerial career
- 1919–1922: Newport County
- 1922–1927: Chesterfield
- 1927–1936: Lincoln City
- 1936–1938: Mansfield Town
- 1938–1939: Notts County
- * Club domestic league appearances and goals

Harold Arnold "Harry" Parkes (September 1888 – March 1947) was an English footballer and the manager of various football clubs in the 1920s and 1930s.

== Playing career ==
Parkes attended Halesowen Grammar School and played for local sides Halesowen Amateurs, Coombs Wood and Halesowen before joining West Bromwich Albion in February 1906. His debut came against Notts County in March 1907 in the FA Cup and he played in the semi-final defeat against Everton later that season.

He left after falling out with the West Bromwich Albion management and joined Coventry City in May 1908. He played 170 league and cup games for Coventry, scoring 38 times before returning to West Bromwich Albion in May 1914. He was player-assistant manager of Albion during the war, while working in munitions. He retired from playing during the war due to cartilage problems.

== Managerial career ==
In June 1919, Parkes was appointed as secretary-manager of Southern League Newport County and Parkes was forced to play in goal in an emergency in April 1920. They joined the expanded Football League in 1920, but County struggled. He became manager of Chesterfield in May 1922, leaving in April 1927 and taking up the manager's post with Lincoln City the following month. He led Lincoln to promotion in 1932, by virtue of winning Division Three North, but Lincoln were relegated again two years later. He left to manage Mansfield Town in May 1936, resigning in January 1938 to manage Notts County. He resigned in July 1939 and retired from football at the same time.
