= Billy Gaughan =

English footballer

Personal information
- Full name: William Bernard Gaughan
- Date of birth: 20 January 1892
- Place of birth: Stoke d'Abernon, England
- Date of death: 1956 (aged 63–64)
- Place of death: Wales
- Position: Outside left

Senior career*
Years	Team	Apps	(Gls)
1912–1914	Cardiff City	4	(0)
1914–1919	Manchester City	10	(0)
1919–1924	Newport County	95	(8)
- * Club domestic league appearances and goals

William Bernard Gaughan (20 January 1892 – 1956) was an English professional footballer who played as an outside left in the Southern League for Cardiff City and the Football League for Newport County and Manchester City.

== Personal life ==
Gaughan served in the Welsh Regiment during the First World War and was commissioned as a second lieutenant in January 1918.

== Career statistics ==
Appearances and goals by club, season and competition
Club	Season	League			FA Cup		Total	
Club	Season	Division	Apps	Goals	Apps	Goals	Apps	Goals
Manchester City	1914–15	First Division	10	0	0	0	10	0
Career total			10	0	0	0	10	0
