= Okoro =

- Language: Igbo

Origin
- Origin: Nigeria
- Meaning: A man
- Region of origin: South east

Other names
- Variant forms: Okoh, Okolo

Okoro // is a very common Igbo surname that means “a man,” equivalent to Mann as used in English-speaking countries. It is a shortened form of òkorobị̀à and typical among Southern Igbos. Likewise, this is where the Igbo “day names” come from: Okeke/Okereke (a man born on Eke); Okoli/Okorie/Okoye (a man born on Olie/Orie/Oye); Okafor/Okorafor (a man born on Afọ); Okonkwo/Okoronkwo (a man born on Nkwọ). Like Okoro, these are no longer used as given names but have become highly common surnames. The Anioma subgroups use the variants Okoh, while the Anambra peoples render it Okolo.

== Surname ==
- Christopher Okoro Cole, (1921–c.1990), Sierra Leonean government official
- Daniel Okoro (born 2003), Nigerian rugby league footballer
- Dawn Okoro, American artist
- Fidelis Okoro, Nigerian politician
- Isaac Okoro (born 2001), American basketball player
- Kenny Okoro (born 1989), American football player
- Marilyn Okoro (born 1984), British athlete
- Melanie Harrison Okoro (born 1982), American environmental scientist
- Osas Okoro (born 1990), Nigerian footballer
- Sandie Okoro (born 1964), British lawyer
- Stanley Okoro (born 1992), Nigerian footballer
- Sunday Patrick Okoro (born 1986), Nigerian footballer
- Yvonne Okoro (born 1984), Ghanaian-Nigerian actress
- Zane Okoro (born 2007), American soccer player

== Given name ==
- Okoro Idozuka, 19th-century Nigerian leader

== See also ==
- Ikot Okoro, Nigerian village
- Okoro Oilfield, Nigerian offshore oilfield
