= Amaka =

- Gender: Female
- Language: Igbo

Origin
- Meaning: Beautiful
- Region of origin: Igboland

Amaka // is a feminine Igbo given name that means “beautiful” (note: amaka is specifically a predicative adjective; one could say Igbo amaka to mean “Igbo is beautiful”. The general Igbo words for beauty are ọma and mma). It is popular as a standalone name, but can also be an element in longer names: e.g., Chiamaka (God is beautiful), Ukamaka (conversation is beautiful), Uzoamaka (the road is beautiful), Ndidiamaka (patience is beautiful) Nneamaka (motherhood is beautiful), and Nwamaka (a child is beautiful).

== Notable people named Amaka ==
- Amaka Agugua-Hamilton (born 1983), American basketball coach
- Amaka Gessler (born 1990), New Zealand swimmer
- Amaka Igwe (1963–2014), Nigerian filmmaker and broadcasting executive
- Amaka Ogoegbunam (born 1990), Nigerian sprinter
- Amaka Osakwe (born 1987), Nigerian fashion designer
- Amaka Umeh, Nigerian actor

== See also ==
- Amaka is the name of Kambili Achike’s cousin in Adichie’s Purple Hibiscus. She is a central supporting character
- Amaka (song), 2Baba featuring Peruzzi
- Christ the King College, Onitsha, popularly known as Amaka Boys, aan all-boys secondary school in Onitsha, Anambra, Nigeria
