= Zane Okoro =

American soccer player (born 2007)

Personal information
- Full name: Zane Kola Okoro
- Date of birth: May 7, 2007 (age 19)
- Place of birth: Norwalk, Connecticut, United States
- Position: Forward

Team information
- Current team: Tranmere Rovers (on loan from Lincoln City)
- Number: 17

Youth career
- 2014–2019: Beachside Soccer Club
- 2019–2023: Brooke House College
- 2023–2024: Lincoln City

Senior career*
Years	Team	Apps	(Gls)
2024–	Lincoln City	3	(0)
2025–2026	→ Coleraine (loan)	30	(4)
2026–	→ Tranmere Rovers (loan)	9	(2)
- * Club domestic league appearances and goals as of 19:20, 3 October 2026 (UTC)

Zane Kola Okoro (born May 7, 2007) is an American professional soccer player who plays as a forward for EFL League Two club Tranmere Rovers, on loan from EFL Championship club Lincoln City.

== Early life ==
Okoro was born on May 7, 2007 in Norwalk, Connecticut, United States. His mother is a British-Nigerian who was born in London, England, while his father was born in Nigeria. He moved to England in 2018.

== Club career ==
=== Lincoln City ===
On November 4, 2024, Okoro made his Imps debut against Chesham United in the first round of the FA Cup, replacing Freddie Draper, before having a hand in Lincoln's fourth goal of the game. He made his full professional debut against Manchester City U21 in the EFL Trophy netting the fourth goal of a 5–0 victory, becoming the second youngest goalscorer in the clubs history. During the 2024–25 season he spent a period of time on trial at Premier League side AFC Bournemouth. Okoro made his first league appearance on April 12, 2025, replacing Joe Gardner in the 68th minute in Lincoln's 1-1 draw against Shrewsbury Town. Following the end of the 2024–25 season, Lincoln City announced they had offered him a new contract to stay at the club. On the June 19, it was confirmed that Okoro had signed his first professional contract, signing a two-year deal with the option of a third.

On September 1, 2025, Okoro joined Coleraine on loan for a season-long loan. It was confirmed in January that he would remain at Coleraine until the end of the season.

On July 21, 2026, Okoro signed a new contract at Lincoln City until the summer of 2029, before immediately going on loan to EFL League Two club Tranmere Rovers on a season-long loan for the 2026–27 season. He would make his debut on 1 August in the EFL Cup preliminary round against Rochdale, where he would miss one of four Tranmere penalties in an eventual loss in the shootout. He scored his first goal on 29 August against Newport County, sliding in at the near post from a low ball.

== Playing style ==
He can play in any position across the front line.

== Career statistics ==
As of October 3, 2026

Club	Season	League			National Cup (Note: Includes FA Cup, Irish Cup)		League Cup (Note: Includes EFL Cup, Northern Ireland Football League Cup)		Other		Total	
Club	Season	Division	Apps	Goals	Apps	Goals	Apps	Goals	Apps	Goals	Apps	Goals
Lincoln City	2024–25	EFL League One	2	0	1	0	0	0	1 (Note: Appearance(s) in EFL Trophy)	1	4	1
Lincoln City	2025–26	EFL League One	1	0	0	0	2	0	—		3	0
Lincoln City	2026–27	EFL Championship	0	0	0	0	0	0	—		0	0
Lincoln City	Total		3	0	1	0	2	0	1	1	7	1
Coleraine (loan)	2025–26	NIFL Premiership	30	4	5	0	4	0	—		39	4
Tranmere Rovers (loan)	2026–27	EFL League Two	9	2	0	0	1	0	1	0	11	2
Career total			42	6	6	0	7	0	2	1	57	7

== Honours ==
Coleraine

- Irish Cup: 2025–26
