= Cadamarteri =

Cadamarteri is an Italian surname. Notable people with the surname include:

- Bailey Cadamarteri (born 2005), Jamaican footballer
- Danny Cadamarteri (born 1979), English footballer
