= Jamie Pardington =

English footballer

Personal information
- Full name: James Christopher Pardington
- Date of birth: 20 July 2000 (age 26)
- Place of birth: Walsall, England
- Height: 6 ft 5 in (1.96 m)
- Position: Goalkeeper

Team information
- Current team: Lincoln City
- Number: 21

Youth career
- Rushall Olympic
- 2018–2019: Wolverhampton Wanderers

Senior career*
Years	Team	Apps	(Gls)
2019–2022	Wolverhampton Wanderers	0	(0)
2020	→ Bath City (loan)	2	(0)
2020	→ Stratford Town (loan)	5	(0)
2020	→ Dulwich Hamlet (loan)	3	(0)
2021	→ Mansfield Town (loan)	2	(0)
2022–2023	Grimsby Town	0	(0)
2023	Larne	1	(0)
2023–2024	Cheltenham Town	1	(0)
2023	→ Truro City (loan)	10	(0)
2024–	Lincoln City	0	(0)
2025	→ Peterborough Sports (loan)	3	(0)
2025	→ AFC Telford United (loan)	0	(0)
2025–2026	→ Oxford City (loan)	7	(0)
2026	→ Kidderminster Harriers (loan)	1	(0)
- * Club domestic league appearances and goals as of 09:35, 25 March 2026 (UTC)

James Christopher Pardington (born 20 July 2000) is an English professional footballer who plays as a goalkeeper for EFL Championship club Lincoln City.

He came through the youth team at Wolverhampton Wanderers, spending time on loan at Bath City, Stratford Town, Dulwich Hamlet and Mansfield Town. During the 2022–23 season he spent time with Grimsby Town and Larne.

== Early life ==
Pardington attended Aldridge School.

== Career ==
=== Wolverhampton Wanderers ===
Pardington began his career with Rushall Olympic before signing for Wolverhampton Wanderers in August 2018. He moved on loan to Bath City in August 2019, to Stratford Town in January 2020, to Dulwich Hamlet in September 2020, and to Mansfield Town in February 2021.

He was released by Wolves at the end of the 2021–22 season.

=== Grimsby Town ===
On 27 September 2022, Pardington joined EFL League Two side Grimsby Town on a short-term contract.

On 4 January 2023, Pardington was released having failed to make a first team appearance.

=== Larne ===
Following his release from Grimsby, Pardington signed for NIFL Premiership side Larne.

Pardington made his Larne debut on the final day of the 2022–23 season against Coleraine, he was subsequently released following the end of his contract.

=== Cheltenham Town ===
On 29 June 2023, Pardington returned to England when he joined League One club Cheltenham Town on a one-year deal. He moved on loan to Truro City in August 2023. He made his debut for Cheltenham on the final day of the 2023-24 season, replacing the injured Luke Southwood in a defeat at Stevenage, which saw the Robins relegated to League Two.

He was released by the club at the end of the 2023–24 season.

=== Lincoln City ===
On 17 June 2024, Lincoln City confirmed Pardington had signed a two-year deal at the club. He made his Lincoln debut against Manchester City U21 in the EFL Trophy on 13 November 2024, playing the full 90 minutes.

On 21 March 2025, he joined Peterborough Sports on a 28 day loan.

On 11 October 2025, he joined AFC Telford United on a one month loan. He was recalled from his loan having played one game, due to a shoulder injury to Zach Jeacock. He joined Oxford City on loan on 22 November 2025, until January 2026. On 24 March 2026, he joined Kidderminster Harriers on a seven-day loan. After the conclusion to the season, he was offered a new contract by Lincoln City, which was subsequently signed in June, keeping him at the club until 2028.

== Career statistics ==
As of end of 2025–26 season

Appearances and goals by club, season and competition
Club	Season	League			FA Cup		League Cup		Other		Total	
Club	Season	Division	Apps	Goals	Apps	Goals	Apps	Goals	Apps	Goals	Apps	Goals
Wolverhampton Wanderers	2019–20	Premier League	0	0	0	0	0	0	0	0	0	0
Wolverhampton Wanderers	2020–21	Premier League	0	0	0	0	0	0	0	0	0	0
Wolverhampton Wanderers	2021–22	Premier League	0	0	0	0	0	0	0	0	0	0
Wolverhampton Wanderers	Total		0	0	0	0	0	0	0	0	0	0
Bath City (loan)	2019–20	National League South	2	0	0	0	—		0	0	2	0
Stratford Town (loan)	2019–20	Southern League Premier Division Central	5	0	0	0	—		0	0	5	0
Dulwich Hamlet (loan)	2020–21	National League South	3	0	2	0	—		0	0	5	0
Mansfield Town (loan)	2020–21	League Two	2	0	0	0	0	0	0	0	2	0
Grimsby Town	2022–23	League Two	0	0	0	0	0	0	0	0	0	0
Larne	2022–23	NIFL Premiership	1	0	0	0	0	0	0	0	1	0
Cheltenham Town	2023–24	League One	1	0	0	0	0	0	0	0	1	0
Truro City (loan)	2023–24	National League South	10	0	0	0	0	0	0	0	10	0
Lincoln City	2024–25	League One	0	0	0	0	0	0	2 (Note: Appearances in the EFL Trophy)	0	2	0
Lincoln City	2025–26	League One	0	0	0	0	0	0	0	0	0	0
Lincoln City	2026–27	Championship	0	0	0	0	0	0	0	0	0	0
Lincoln City	Total		0	0	0	0	0	0	2	0	2	0
Peterborough Sports (loan)	2024–25	National League North	3	0	0	0	—		0	0	3	0
AFC Telford (loan)	2025–26	National League North	0	0	1	0	—		0	0	1	0
Oxford City (loan)	2025–26	National League North	7	0	—		—		0	0	7	0
Kidderminster Harriers (loan)	2025–26	National League North	1	0	—		—		0	0	1	0
Career total			35	0	3	0	0	0	2	0	40	0
