= Okeke =

- Gender: male
- Language: Igbo

Origin
- Word/name: Nigeria
- Meaning: South East Nigeria

Okeke audio is a Nigerian surname of Igbo origin. Notable people with the surname include:

- Aham Okeke (born 1969), Nigerian-born Norwegian sprinter
- Chidi Okeke (born 1996), American football player
- Chidinma Okeke (born 2000), Nigerian professional footballer
- Chika Okeke-Agulu (born 1966), Nigerian artist
- Chuma Okeke (born 1998), American basketball player
- Daniel Okeke (born 2001), Irish rugby union player
- David Okeke (born 1998), Italian basketball player
- Edward Ikem Okeke (1942–1995), a Nigerian politician
- Francisca Nneka Okeke, physicist
- Gideon Okeke, Nigerian actor
- Henry Okeke, Nigerian Anglican bishop
- Janet Okeke (born 2006), Canadian soccer player
- Jid Okeke (born 2004), German footballer
- Michael Okeke (born 2005), English footballer
- Nkem Okeke, Nigerian politician
- Obi Okeke, multiple people
- Pius N. Okeke (born 1941), Nigerian astronomer and educator
- P.N. Okeke-Ojiudu (1914–1995), Nigerian first republic politician and businessman
- Simon Okeke (born 1936), Nigerian politician
- Uzooma Okeke (born 1970), Canadian football player
- Uche Okeke (1933–2016), Nigerian artist
- Valerian Okeke (born 1953), Nigerian Catholic prelate
- Vivian Okeke, Nigerian diplomat
