= Paudie O'Connor =

Irish footballer (born 1997)

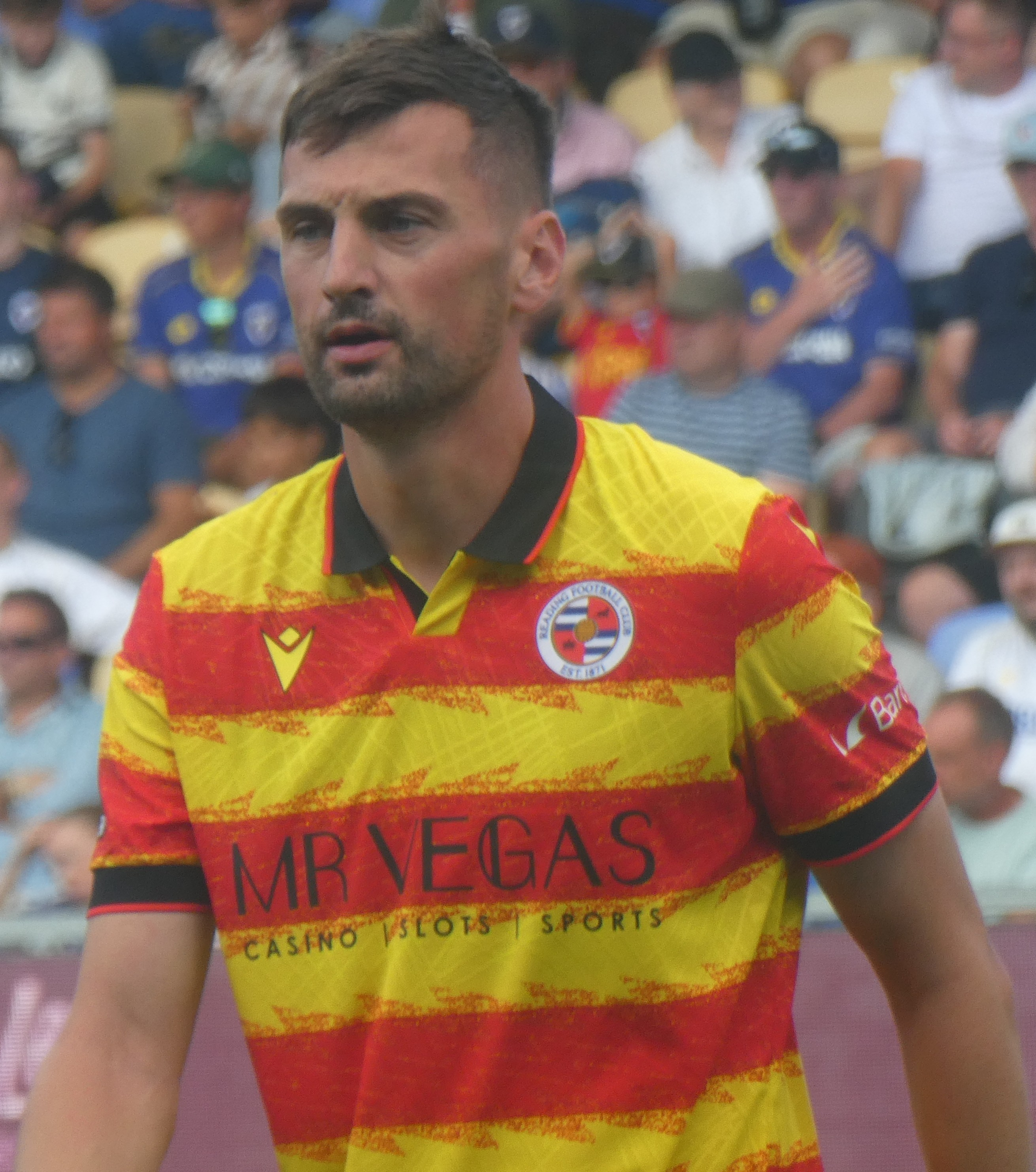
- O'Connor with Reading in 2026

Personal information
- Full name: Padhraic John O'Connor
- Date of birth: 14 July 1997 (age 29)
- Place of birth: Limerick, Ireland
- Height: 1.91 m (6 ft 3 in)
- Position: Centre-back

Team information
- Current team: Reading
- Number: 15

Youth career
- Breska Rovers
- Regional United
- 2014–2015: Limerick

Senior career*
Years	Team	Apps	(Gls)
2015–2017	Limerick	40	(3)
2017–2019	Leeds United	4	(0)
2018–2019	→ Blackpool (loan)	10	(0)
2019	→ Bradford City (loan)	9	(0)
2019–2022	Bradford City	106	(7)
2022–2025	Lincoln City	121	(6)
2025–	Reading	36	(3)
- * Club domestic league appearances and goals as of 16:12, 2 May 2026 (UTC)

Padhraic John O'Connor (born 14 July 1997) is an Irish professional footballer who plays as a centre-back for EFL League One club Reading.

== Early life ==
O'Connor was born in Limerick.

== Club career ==
=== Limerick ===
O'Connor made his professional debut on 7 March 2015, playing the full 90 minutes in a 3–0 loss to Bohemians in the League of Ireland Premier Division. He went on to make 16 appearances in the 2015 season, scoring his first professional goal on 14 August against Cork City. Following Limerick's relegation to the First Division, O'Connor made 23 appearances in the 2016 League of Ireland First Division in 2016, scoring two goals in the title-winning season. He also featured in the 2016 League of Ireland Cup Final as his side lost 4–1 to St Patrick's Athletic.

=== Leeds United ===
O'Connor had trials at Crystal Palace and Leicester City, then another with Leeds United in March 2017, where he impressed then-coach Garry Monk enough to secure a 2 1/2-year contract for an undisclosed fee from Limerick. He initially joined the Under-23 team, but participated in the 2017–18 first team's preseason under new coach Thomas Christiansen, and was called up onto the bench for the EFL Cup match against Newport County on 22 August 2017. O'Connor was named the Leeds Under 23s squad's captain for the 2017/18 season.

Due to an injury crisis in defence, on 3 April 2018, O'Connor was named by new manager Paul Heckingbottom in Leeds' first team for their travelling squad for Leeds EFL Championship game against Fulham at Craven Cottage although he was not named among the substitutes. His first team debut (and first booking) came as a central defender alongside Pontus Jansson as Leeds came back from 0–1 down to earn a home point against Sunderland, with O'Connor earning praise for his first senior game.

On 16 April 2018, O'Connor was nominated as one of four players for Leeds United's Young Player of the Year award, which was won by Bailey Peacock-Farrell.

On 29 June 2018, O'Connor signed a new two-year contract extension at Leeds, with the option of an additional year. After his signing the contract, director of football Victor Orta said of O'Connor, "he will be a key player for Leeds United for many years to come", and that the club intended to send him out on loan for regular games.

==== Blackpool (loan) ====
On 3 July 2018, O'Connor joined EFL League One side Blackpool on loan until 31 May 2019, in order to gain first team experience. He made his debut on 4 August in Blackpool's 0–0 draw against Wycombe Wanderers. On 4 September, O'Connor scored his first goal for Blackpool, deep into injury time in a 3–3 draw at Moss Rose against Macclesfield Town in the EFL Trophy. Macclesfield emerged the victors after winning the resulting penalty shootout 5–3.

O'Connor scored his second goal of the season, on 31 October, in a 2–1 defeat to Premier League side Arsenal in the Carabao Cup at the Emirates Stadium. O'Connor was also sent off late in the same game for a tackle on Arsenal striker Pierre-Emerick Aubameyang.

His final game for Blackpool before being recalled early by Leeds came on 5 January 2019 when he started in a 0-3 FA Cup defeat against Premier League side Arsenal. In total he played 17 games for Blackpool scoring 2 goals in all competitions.

=== Bradford City ===
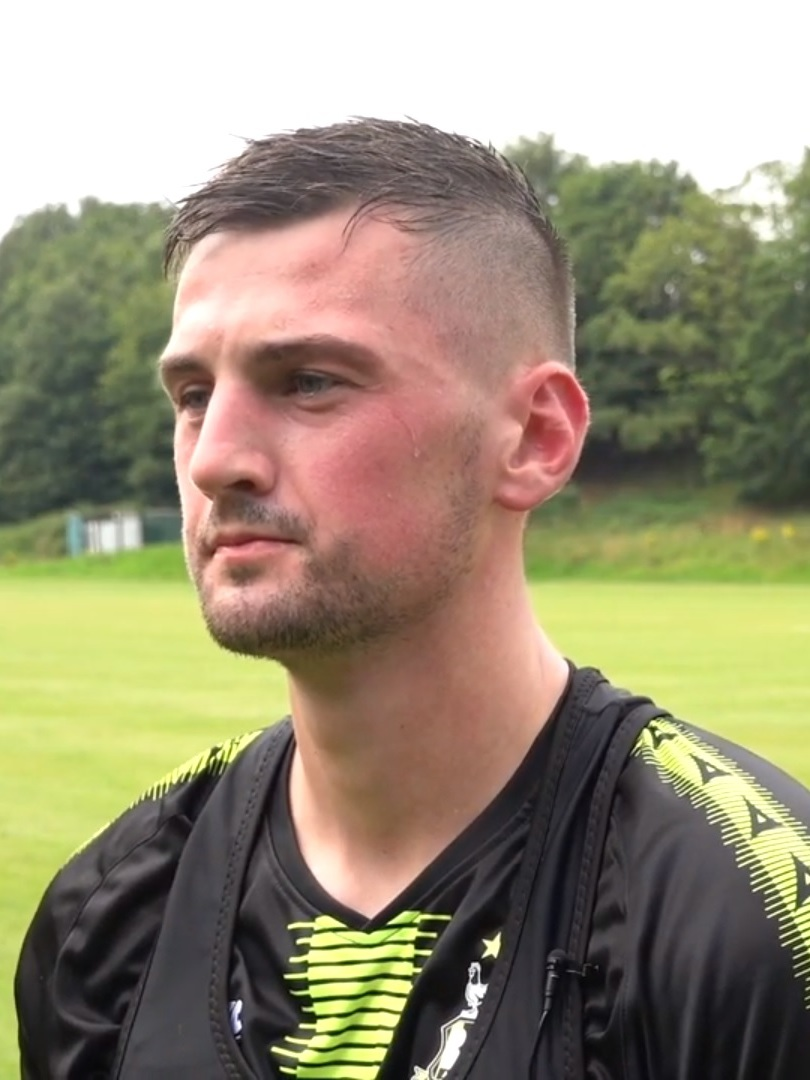
O'Connor with Bradford City in 2020

On 8 January 2019, O'Connor signed for Bradford City on loan until the end of the 2018–19 season after cutting his loan deal with Blackpool short. At Bradford O'Connor had limited game time due to Rule 54.4.1 of the EFL Rules and Regulations which states that, "A maximum of 5 players registered on a temporary loan transfer can be named in the players listed on a team sheet for any individual match played under the auspices of The League."

However, after the appointment of Gary Bowyer as manager, O'Connor impressed in his short spell at Bradford playing nine games, becoming the captain for the remainder of the season under the new manager.

In June 2019 O'Connor returned to Bradford City on a three-year permanent contract. He scored his first goal for Bradford when he scored in an EFL Trophy tie against Bolton Wanderers on 3 September 2019.

In May 2021 he won four awards at the Bradford City end-of-season awards, including Player of the Year. In May 2022 he was again voted Player of the Year, as well as Player's Player of the Year. He was one of seven players offered a new contract by Bradford City at the end of the 2021–22 season.

=== Lincoln City ===
On 13 June 2022, it was announced he would join Lincoln City on a long-term contract following the expiration of his Bradford City contract. He made his Lincoln debut on the opening day of the season against Exeter City. His first goal came against Bristol City in the EFL Cup third round on 8 November 2022. He was awarded City's Player of the Season for an impressive debut season.

On 3 August 2023, he was appointed the new captain of Lincoln City.

On 10 August 2024, O'Connor scored two headed goals to give Lincoln a 3–2 away win in their season opener at Burton Albion. Following the end of the 2024–25 season O'Connor was offered a new contract from Lincoln City, despite interest from Derby County and Stoke City.

=== Reading ===
On 17 June 2025, Reading announced the signing of O'Connor to a four-year contract, from 1 July 2025 once his Lincoln City contract has expired. He suffered an injury pre-season, so didn't make his debut until 11 October, starting against Exeter City.

== Career statistics ==
As of 2 May 2026

Appearances and goals by club, season and competition
Club	Season	League			National Cup		League Cup		Other		Total	
Club	Season	Division	Apps	Goals	Apps	Goals	Apps	Goals	Apps	Goals	Apps	Goals
Limerick	2015	LOI Premier Division	16	1	0	0	0	0	0	0	16	1
Limerick	2016	LOI First Division	24	2	0	0	5	0	0	0	29	2
Limerick	Total		40	3	0	0	5	0	0	0	45	3
Leeds United	2017–18	Championship	4	0	0	0	0	0	0	0	4	0
Leeds United	2018–19	Championship	0	0	0	0	0	0	0	0	0	0
Leeds United	Total		4	0	0	0	0	0	0	0	4	0
Blackpool (loan)	2018–19	League One	10	0	1	0	3	1	3 (Note: Appearance(s) in EFL Trophy)	1	17	2
Bradford City (loan)	2018–19	League One	9	0	0	0	0	0	0	0	9	0
Bradford City	2019–20	League Two	19	2	1	0	1	0	2	1	23	3
Bradford City	2020–21	League Two	42	2	2	0	2	0	2	0	48	2
Bradford City	2021–22	League Two	45	3	2	0	1	0	1	0	49	3
Bradford City	Total		106	7	5	0	4	0	5	1	120	8
Lincoln City	2022–23	League One	44	1	1	0	4	1	4	0	53	2
Lincoln City	2023–24	League One	38	2	1	0	2	0	2	0	43	2
Lincoln City	2024–25	League One	39	3	3	1	1	0	2	0	45	4
Lincoln City	Total		121	6	5	1	7	1	8	0	141	8
Reading	2025–26	League One	36	3	0	0	0	0	0	0	36	3
Career total			326	19	11	1	19	2	16	2	372	24

== Honours ==
Limerick

- League of Ireland First Division: 2016

Individual

- Bradford City Player of the Season: 2020–21, 2021–22
- PFAI Team of the Year: First Division 2016
