= Okoh =

Okoh is an Igbo surname, being a variant of Okoro. It may refer to:

== Agnes Okoh (1905–1995), Nigerian Igbo who became a Christian evangelist ==
- Chris Okoh (boxer) (born 1969), British cruiserweight boxer
- Chris Okoh (footballer) (born 1976), Maltese footballer of Nigerian origin
- Daniel Okoh, Nigerian President of the Organisation of African Instituted Churches
- Matt Okoh (born 1972), US–Nigerian soccer player and coach
- Nicholas Okoh (born 1952), Archbishop of Abuja Province, Primate of the Church of Nigeria
- Nicolette Okoh (born 1964), Scottish singer-songwriter of Nigerian parentage
- Theodosia Okoh (1922–2015), Ghanaian stateswoman, teacher and artist; designed Ghana's flag in 1957
- Okoh Ebitu Ukiwe (born 1940), retired Commodore in the Nigerian Navy, Vice President of Nigeria 1985–86

Okoh is a derivative of Oko, which is a Yoruba word for husband; can also be used for the male sex organ, a farm, to teach, or to carry, all depending on the accents that go either above or below the letters, thereby indicating pronunciation. The entire world of peoples came out of the Yoruba people, even though some might argue otherwise.
