= Abel Adelakun Ayoko =

Nigerian diplomat

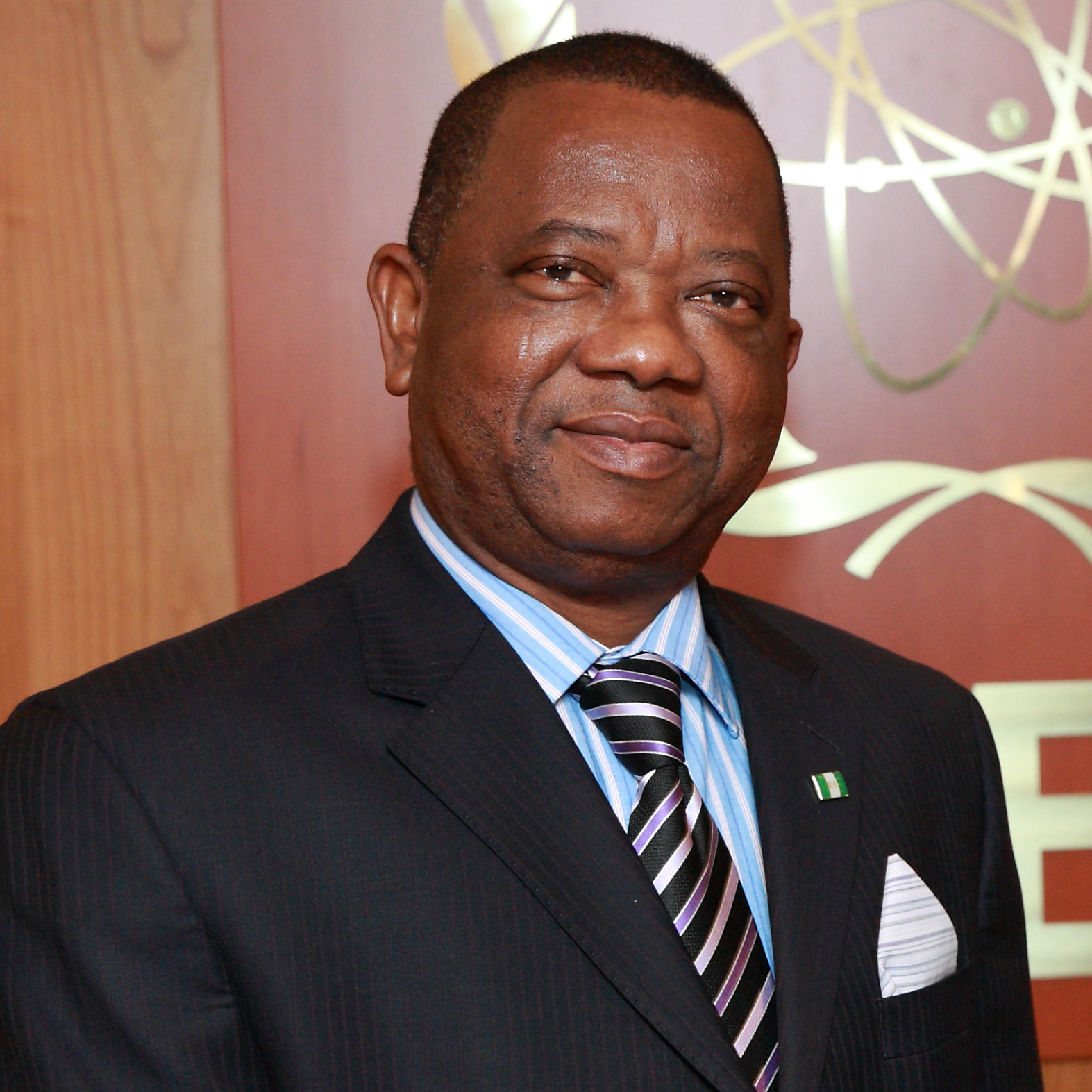
- Abel Adelakun Ayoko
- Born: 14 February 1957 (age 68); Ondo City
- Known for: Ambassador to Austria
- Successor: Maria Oyeyinka Laose

Abel Adelakun Ayoko is the Nigerian Ambassador extraordinary and plenipotentiary to Austria and Slovakia.

== Life ==
Ayoko was born on 14 February 1957 and holds a master's degree in International Law and Diplomacy. He served at the Nigerian Embassy in Vienna as a Senior Counsellor from 1998 – 2002.

Ayoko was as born in Ondo, Nigeria, graduated at the University of Lagos and he also had Masters from the same university. Ayoko is married with four boys. He has been in the Foreign Service as a diplomat for 32 years and has served in different capacities in the Ministry of Foreign Affairs. His first posting was to Lusaka in 1987. From there he was cross-posted to Angola in 1989 where he stayed for four years.

His job then was to educate young people who were interested in going to school in Namibia and South Africa. Selected pupils were sent to Nigeria to educate them, in an attempt to support these countries during colonial rule. As a young staff officer, he was also involved in political and economic reports, and was in Angola during the war. He was posted back to Nigeria, then later was posted to Vienna, Austria as a younger officer from 1998 to 2002.

Ayoko took up the post of ambassador from Maria Oyeyinka Laose who had served for two years.

Vivian Okeke presented her credentials as the Nigerian ambassador to Austria's President, Dr Alexander Van der Bellen, in October 2017.
