= Maria Oyeyinka Laose =

Nigerian diplomat

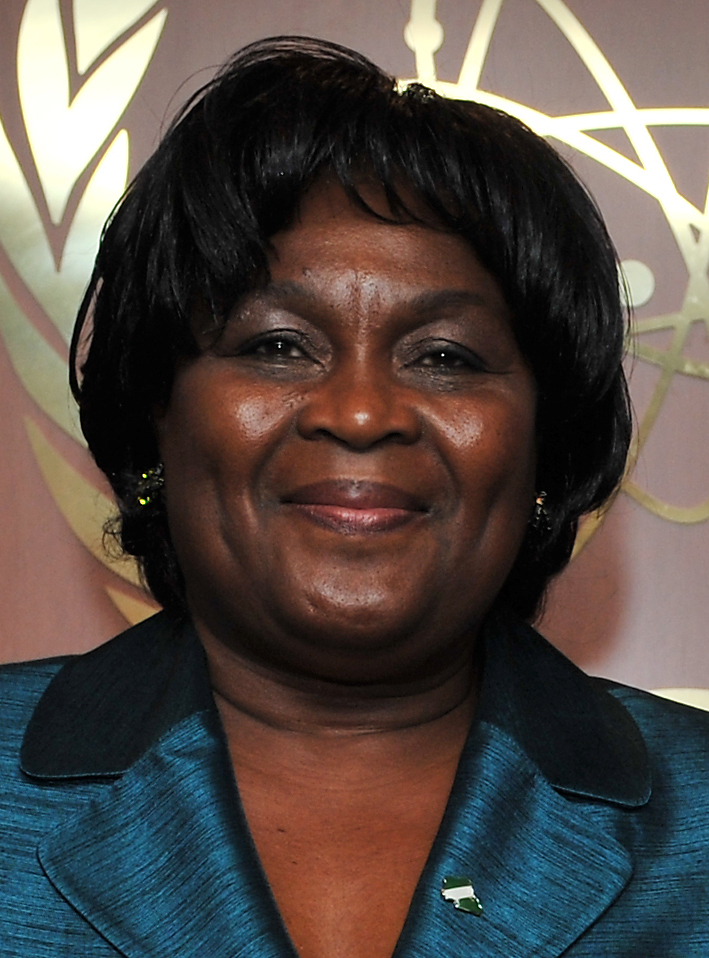
- Born: October 7, 1954 (age 71); Abeokuta
- Education: St Teresa's College, Ibadan University of Ife, BA(Hons) French and Modern Languages
- Occupations: Ambassador and Diplomat
- Employer: Ministry Of Foreign Affairs
- Predecessor: Amb. Jerry Ugokwe
- Successor: Amb. Abel Ayoko
- Political party: Non-partisan

Maria Oyeyinka Laose is the first female Nigerian Ambassador/Permanent Representative to Austria, Slovakia, UNOV and International Organisations in Vienna. She was appointed in 2011 by H.E President Goodluck Ebele Jonathan and served until mid 2013 upon her retirement from the Nigerian foreign service after 35 meritorious years. She studied French at the University of Ife and received her BA Honours in 1975.

She is fluent in English, French and Portuguese. She started her career in the foreign service in 1978.

Amb.Laose served in various capacities in the Ministry of Foreign Affairs, among them: Director, UN Division and International Organizations Department (2007-2011); Director, Foreign Service Academy (2006-2007); Minister, Chargé d'Affaires, Nigerian Embassy/Permanent Mission to the United Nations in Vienna, Austria (2002-2006); Deputy Chief of Protocol, assistant director, European Affairs Department (1998-2002); Counselor, Nigerian Permanent Mission to the UN in New York, United States (1992-1998); and First Secretary, Nigerian Embassy in Paris, France (1982-1986).

She rose through the ranks and was appointed Nigerian Ambassador to Austria and Slovakia by H.E President Goodluck Ebele Jonathan in 2011. She is the first female Nigerian Ambassador/ Permanent representative to Austria, Slovakia, UNOV and International Organisations in Vienna.

Her tenure as the Nigerian Ambassador to Austria and Slovakia saw the first visit of a high-level Austrian official (Vice- Chancellor Michael Spindelegger) to Nigeria after 50 years of diplomatic relations.

Laose was a controversial figure as she was seen as inaccessible by Nigerians living in Austria. She was replaced in January 2014 by Abel Adelakun Ayoko who had also worked at the embassy.

== Private life ==
She has two children.
