= 2024–25 Lincoln City F.C. season =

140th season in existence of Lincoln City FC

Lincoln City
2024–25 season
- Chairman: Clive Nates
- Manager: Michael Skubala
- Stadium: LNER Stadium
- League One: 11th
- FA Cup: Third round (vs. Birmingham City)
- EFL Cup: First round (vs. Harrogate Town)
- EFL Trophy: Round of 16 (vs. Bolton Wanderers)
- Top goalscorer: League: James Collins (10); All: Jovon Makama (11)
- Highest home attendance: 10,347 vs Wrexham, 3 May 2025, League One
- Lowest home attendance: 2,208 vs Chesterfield, 3 September 2024, EFL Trophy
- Average home league attendance: 9,004
- Biggest win: 5–0 vs Manchester City U21 (H), 12 November 2024, EFL Trophy; 5–0 vs Bristol Rovers (H), 15 March 2025, League One
- Biggest defeat: 0–3 vs Crawley Town (A), 22 October 2024, EFL Trophy; 0–3 vs Bolton Wanderers (A), 29 December 2024, EFL Trophy
| Home colours | Away colours | Third colours |

The 2024–25 season is the 141st season in the history of Lincoln City and their sixth consecutive season in League One. The club are participating in League One, the FA Cup, the EFL Cup, and the 2024–25 EFL Trophy.

== Season overview ==
=== June ===
On 3 June, Sean Roughan was called up to the Republic of Ireland U21 squad.

On 6 June, the club launched their new home and away strip for the season.

On 6 June, Lincoln confirmed that Branston would remain their front of shirt sponsor for their home kit for the upcoming season.

On 7 June, CEO Liam Scully was elected to the EFL board as a League One representative.

On 14 June, assistant manager Chris Cohen joins Stoke City as assistant head coach.

On 28 June, the players reported back for pre-season training.

=== August ===
On 2 August, Lincoln confirmed David Bridges would return as the new assistant manager, Josh Snowden as the new head of sports science, Jack Coles as the head of recruitment and George Bush as first-team performance analyst, whilst Marc Tracy takes on the role of loans manager.

On 5 August, the club confirmed its squad numbers for the season.

On 6 August, the stadium naming rights with LNER were extended until the end of the 2025/26 season.

On 9 August, the club launched their third strip for the season.

On 9 August, head coach Michael Skubala signed a new contract until the end of the 2027/28 season.

On 22 August, JJ McKiernan was called up to the Northern Ireland U21 squad.

On 28 August, the match against Northampton Town was postponed due to international call ups.

On 29 August, Sean Roughan was called up to the Republic of Ireland U21 squad.

=== October ===
On 1 October, the match against Wrexham was postponed due to international call ups.

On 2 October, Pablo Webster was replaced by Nick Ragland on the clubs board.

On 2 October, JJ McKiernan was called up to the Northern Ireland U21 squad.

On 3 October, Sean Roughan was called up to the Republic of Ireland U21 squad.

=== November ===
On 4 November, Chris Cohen returned to the clubs coaching team.

On 21 November, David Bridges left his role as assistant head coach.

=== December ===
On 20 December, Academy Technical Director Jonathan Pepper, left the club to join Sheffield Wednesday as their new Academy Manager.

=== January ===
On 29 January, the club published their annual accounts for the year ending June 2024.

=== March ===
On 13 March, Joe Gardner was called up to the Republic of Ireland U21 squad.

=== May ===
On 13 May, the club announced their retained list following the end of the season.

== Current squad ==
As of 13 May 2025

| No. | Name | Position | Nationality | Place of birth | Date of birth (age) | Signed from | Date signed | Fee | Contract end |
Goalkeepers
| 1 | George Wickens | GK | (England) | Petersfield | 8 November 2001 (age 25) | Fulham | 20 July 2024 | Nominal Fee | 30 June 2028 |
| 21 | Jamie Pardington | GK | (England) | Aldridge | 20 July 2000 (age 26) | Cheltenham Town | 1 July 2024 | Free Transfer | 30 June 2026 |
| 31 | Zach Jeacock | GK | (England) | Birmingham | 8 May 2001 (age 25) | Birmingham City | 3 July 2024 | Free Transfer | 30 June 2026 |
Defenders
| 2 | Tendayi Darikwa | RB | (Zimbabwe) | Nottingham | 13 December 1991 (age 34) | Apollon Limassol | 5 July 2022 | Free Transfer | 30 June 2026 |
| 4 | Lewis Montsma | CB | (Netherlands) | Amsterdam | 25 April 1998 (age 28) | FC Dordrecht | 14 July 2020 | Free Transfer | 30 June 2027 |
| 5 | Adam Jackson | CB | (England) | Darlington | 18 May 1994 (age 32) | Hibernian | 11 August 2020 | Undisclosed | 30 June 2026 |
| 15 | Paudie O'Connor | CB | (Republic of Ireland) | Limerick | 14 July 1997 (age 29) | Bradford City | 1 July 2022 | Free Transfer | 30 June 2025 |
| 22 | Tom Hamer | CB | (England) | Bolton | 1 October 1999 (age 27) | Burton Albion | 19 July 2024 | Undisclosed | 30 June 2027 |
| 23 | Sean Roughan | LB | (Republic of Ireland) | Dublin | 14 March 2003 (age 23) | Academy | 28 July 2020 | —N/a | 30 June 2025 |
| 39 | Charlie Parks | CB | (England) | | 19 April 2007 (age 19) | Academy | 13 May 2025 | —N/a | 30 June 2027 |
Midfielders
| 6 | Ethan Erhahon | CM | (Scotland) | Glasgow | 9 May 2001 (age 25) | St Mirren | 31 January 2023 | Undisclosed | 30 June 2026 |
| 8 | Tom Bayliss | CM | (England) | Leicester | 6 April 1999 (age 27) | Shrewsbury Town | 1 July 2024 | Free Transfer | 30 June 2026 |
| 11 | Ethan Hamilton | CM | (Scotland) | Edinburgh | 18 October 1998 (age 28) | Accrington Stanley | 1 August 2023 | Undisclosed | 30 June 2026 |
| 12 | Erik Ring | LM | (Sweden) | Södertälje | 24 April 2002 (age 24) | AIK | 23 August 2024 | Undisclosed | 30 June 2028 |
| 14 | Conor McGrandles | CM | (Scotland) | Falkirk | 24 September 1995 (age 31) | Charlton Athletic | 14 June 2024 | Undisclosed | 30 June 2026 |
| 16 | Dom Jefferies | CM | (Wales) | Newport | 22 May 2002 (age 24) | Gillingham | 18 July 2024 | Undisclosed | 30 June 2026 |
| 24 | Sam Clucas | CM | (England) | Lincoln | 25 August 1990 (age 36) | Oldham Athletic | 17 January 2025 | Undisclosed | 30 June 2025 |
| 28 | Jack Moylan | AM | (Republic of Ireland) | Kilbarrack | 1 September 2001 (age 25) | Shelbourne | 1 January 2024 | Free Transfer | 30 June 2027 |
| 38 | Denny Oliver | CM | (England) | | 4 April 2007 (age 19) | Academy | —N/a | —N/a | —N/a |
Forwards
| 7 | Reeco Hackett | RW | (Saint Lucia) | Redbridge | 9 January 1998 (age 28) | Portsmouth | 14 June 2023 | Undisclosed | 30 June 2026 |
| 9 | Bailey Cadamarteri | CF | (England) | Leeds | 9 May 2005 (age 21) | Sheffield Wednesday | 28 August 2024 | Loan | 31 May 2025 |
| 18 | Ben House | CF | (Scotland) | Guildford | 5 July 1999 (age 27) | Eastleigh | 24 January 2022 | Undisclosed | 30 June 2026 |
| 25 | James Collins | CF | (Republic of Ireland) | Coventry | 1 December 1990 (age 35) | Derby County | 20 January 2025 | Undisclosed | 30 June 2026 |
| 27 | Jovon Makama | CF | (England) | Nottingham | 2 February 2004 (age 22) | Derby County | 1 July 2022 | Free Transfer | 30 June 2027 |
| 32 | Joe Gardner | CF | (Republic of Ireland) | Nottingham | 6 June 2005 (age 21) | Nottingham Forest | 31 January 2025 | Loan | 31 May 2025 |
| 34 | Freddie Draper | CF | (England) | | 28 July 2004 (age 22) | Derby County | 1 July 2020 | Free Transfer | 30 June 2028 |
| 36 | Zane Okoro | RW | (United States) | Norwalk | 7 May 2007 (age 19) | Brooke House College | —N/a | —N/a | —N/a |
Out on loan
| 10 | JJ McKiernan | CM | (Northern Ireland) | Southampton | 18 January 2002 (age 24) | Morecambe | 1 July 2024 | Nominal Fee | 30 June 2028 |
| 19 | Tyler Walker | CF | (England) | Nottingham | 17 October 1996 (age 30) | Coventry City | 12 July 2023 | Free Transfer | 30 June 2025 |
| 20 | Jay Benn | RB | (England) | Bradford | 22 August 2001 (age 25) | FC Halifax Town | 1 July 2022 | Undisclosed | 30 June 2025 |
| 26 | Oisin Gallagher | CM | (Republic of Ireland) | Derry | 2 December 2004 (age 21) | Derry City | 1 July 2021 | Undisclosed | 30 June 2026 |
| 29 | Rob Street | CF | (England) | Oxford | 26 September 2001 (age 25) | Cheltenham Town | 2 July 2024 | Undisclosed | 30 June 2028 |
| 35 | MJ Kamson-Kamara | CB | (England) | Farnborough | 14 February 2006 (age 20) | Academy | 23 February 2023 | —N/a | 30 June 2026 |
| – | Zak Bradshaw | CB | (England) | Hatfield | 22 September 2003 (age 23) | Ipswich Town | 2 February 2024 | Undisclosed | 30 June 2026 |
| – | Gbolahan Okewoye | CM | (England) | | | Academy | 13 May 2025 | —N/a | 30 June 2026 |
| – | Alistair Smith | CM | (England) | Beverley | 19 May 1999 (age 27) | Sutton United | 1 July 2023 | Free Transfer | 30 June 2025 |

== Pre-season and friendlies ==
On 8 May, the club announced they would once again return to Spain for a week's training camp in Murcia, with a friendly against Preston North End. Two more friendlies against Harrogate Town and Oldham Athletic were added on 16 May. They would finish their pre-season campaign announcing a friendly against Arsenal U21 as well as some unknown behind-closed-door friendlies.

| 12 July 2024 Friendly | Preston North End | 0–1 | Lincoln City | San Pedro del Pinatar |
| 11:00 CEST (10:00 BST) | | Report | Makama 2' | Stadium: Pinatar Arena |

| 20 July 2024 Friendly | Oldham Athletic | 0–0 | Lincoln City | Oldham |
| 15:00 BST | | Report | | Stadium: Boundary Park; Referee: Declan Brown |

| 23 July 2024 Friendly | Walsall | 1–2 | Lincoln City | Bescot |
| 17:00 GMT | Jellis 65' | Report | Makama 30'; Bayliss 39' | Stadium: Bescot Stadium; Attendance: 0 (Behind-closed-doors) |

| 27 July 2024 Friendly | Harrogate Town | 0–4 | Lincoln City | Harrogate |
| 15:00 BST | | Report | Duffy 5'; Roughan 8'; Draper 75'; Street 85' | Stadium: EnviroVent Stadium; Attendance: 1,259; Referee: Adam Herczeg |

| 30 July 2024 Friendly | Norwich City U21 | 1–2 | Lincoln City | Norwich |
| 17:00 GMT | 33' | Report | Makama 18'; Jefferies | Stadium: Lotus Training Centre; Attendance: 0 (Behind-closed-doors) |

| 3 August 2024 Friendly | Lincoln City | 2–1 | Arsenal U21 | Lincoln |
| 15:00 BST | Monstma 59'; House 71' | Report | Oulad M'Hand 57' | Stadium: LNER Stadium; Attendance: 3,051 |

== Competitions ==
=== League One ===
==== League table ====
| Pos | Team | Pld | W | D | L | GF | GA | GD | Pts |
|---|---|---|---|---|---|---|---|---|---|
| 9 | Blackpool | 46 | 17 | 16 | 13 | 72 | 60 | +12 | 67 |
| 10 | Huddersfield Town | 46 | 19 | 7 | 20 | 58 | 55 | +3 | 64 |
| 11 | Lincoln City | 46 | 16 | 13 | 17 | 64 | 56 | +8 | 61 |
| 12 | Barnsley | 46 | 17 | 10 | 19 | 69 | 73 | −4 | 61 |
| 13 | Rotherham United | 46 | 16 | 11 | 19 | 54 | 59 | −5 | 59 |

Source: EFL Official Website
Rules for classification: 1) Points; 2) Goal difference; 3) Number of goals scored; 4) Head-to-head results; 5) Wins; 6) Away goals; 7) Penalty points (sec 9.5); 8) 12-point sending off offences

==== Results summary ====
| Overall | | | | | | | | Home | | | | | | Away | | | | | |
| Pld | W | D | L | GF | GA | GD | Pts | W | D | L | GF | GA | GD | W | D | L | GF | GA | GD |
|---|---|---|---|---|---|---|---|---|---|---|---|---|---|---|---|---|---|---|---|
| 46 | 16 | 13 | 17 | 64 | 56 | +8 | 61 | 10 | 6 | 7 | 37 | 24 | +13 | 6 | 7 | 10 | 27 | 32 | −5 |

Last updated: 3 May 2025.
Source: Soccerway

==== Results by round ====
| Round | 1 | 2 | 3 | 4 | 6 | 7 | 8 | 9 | 10 | 12 | 13 | 14 | 5^{1} | 15 | 16 | 17 | 11^{2} | 18 | 19 | 20 | 21 | 22 | 23 | 24 | 25 | 27 | 28 | 29 | 30 | 31 | 32 | 26^{3} | 33 | 34 | 35 | 36 | 37 | 38 | 39 | 40 | 41 | 42 | 43 | 44 | 45 | 46 |
|---|---|---|---|---|---|---|---|---|---|---|---|---|---|---|---|---|---|---|---|---|---|---|---|---|---|---|---|---|---|---|---|---|---|---|---|---|---|---|---|---|---|---|---|---|---|---|
| Ground | A | H | H | A | A | H | A | A | H | H | A | H | H | A | A | H | A | A | H | A | H | A | A | H | H | A | H | H | A | H | A | A | H | A | H | A | H | H | A | H | A | H | A | H | A | H |
| Result | W | L | W | W | D | D | W | D | W | L | L | W | W | D | D | L | L | L | D | D | W | L | L | L | D | W | W | L | D | D | L | W | L | L | W | L | W | D | L | W | D | D | W | W | L | L |
| Position | 3 | 12 | 6 | 4 | 6 | 5 | 3 | 4 | 4 | 7 | 10 | 8 | 5 | 5 | 6 | 7 | 9 | 9 | 9 | 9 | 6 | 9 | 12 | 12 | 12 | 11 | 11 | 11 | 12 | 11 | 13 | 10 | 13 | 13 | 12 | 13 | 12 | 12 | 12 | 12 | 11 | 12 | 11 | 11 | 11 | 11 |
| Points | 3 | 3 | 6 | 9 | 10 | 11 | 14 | 15 | 18 | 18 | 18 | 21 | 24 | 25 | 26 | 26 | 26 | 26 | 27 | 28 | 31 | 31 | 31 | 31 | 32 | 35 | 38 | 38 | 39 | 40 | 40 | 43 | 43 | 43 | 46 | 46 | 49 | 50 | 50 | 53 | 54 | 55 | 58 | 61 | 61 | 61 |

Updated to match(es) played on 3 May 2025. Source: [ Soccerway]
A = Away; H = Home; W = Win; D = Draw; L = Loss; P = Postponed
Notes:
- ^{1} Matchday 5 (vs Northampton Town) was postponed due to international call-ups.
- ^{2} Matchday 11 (vs Wrexham) was postponed due to international call-ups.
- ^{3} Matchday 26 (vs Mansfield Town) was postponed due to both teams participation in the FA Cup.

==== Matches ====
On Wednesday, 26 June 2024, the EFL League One fixtures were revealed.

| 10 August 2024 1 | Burton Albion | 2–3 | Lincoln City | Burton upon Trent |
| 17:30 BST | Godwin-Malife 5'; Bodin 41' | Report | O'Connor 9', 86'; Darikwa 22'; Duffy (yellow card) 43'; Erhahon (yellow card) 90' | Stadium: Pirelli Stadium; Attendance: 5,027; Referee: Edward Duckworth |
Note: Live on Sky Sports.

| 17 August 2024 2 | Lincoln City | 1–2 | Barnsley | Lincoln |
| 15:00 BST | House 70' | Report | Cosgrove 13' (yellow card) 90+4'; Roberts 47'; Russell (yellow card) 65' | Stadium: LNER Stadium; Attendance: 9,768; Referee: Martin Coy |

| 24 August 2024 3 | Lincoln City | 4–1 | Mansfield Town | Lincoln |
| 15:00 BST | Jackson 29', 47'; McGrandles (yellow card) 31'; House (yellow card) 43' (goal) 51'; Roughan 45+2'; O'Connor (yellow card) 75' | Report | Quinn (yellow card) 18'; Oshilaja (yellow card) 23' (goal) 69'; Hewitt (yellow card) 63' | Stadium: LNER Stadium; Attendance: 9,809; Referee: Seb Stockbridge |

| 31 August 2024 4 | Stevenage | 0–1 | Lincoln City | Stevenage |
| 15:00 BST | Smith (yellow card) 48'; Aboh (yellow card) 84'; Piergianni (yellow card) 90+10' | Report | House (yellow card) 32'; Erhahon (yellow card) 44'; O'Connoer (yellow card) 66' (yellow-red card) 90+10'; Moylan 72' (pen.); Draper (yellow card) 90' | Stadium: Lamex Stadium; Attendance: 4,017; Referee: David Rock |

| 14 September 2024 6 | Peterborough United | 1–1 | Lincoln City | Peterborough |
| 15:00 BST | Collins (yellow card) 44'; Curtis (yellow card) 60'; Poku 65'; Sparkes (yellow card) 90+7' | Report | House 33'; Darikwa (yellow card) 52' | Stadium: Weston Homes Stadium; Attendance: 9,537; Referee: Tom Reeves |

| 21 September 2024 7 | Lincoln City | 0–0 | Wigan Athletic | Lincoln |
| 12:30 BST | Jackson (yellow card) 45'; Darikwa (yellow card) 84' | Report | Carragher (yellow card) 51' | Stadium: LNER Stadium; Attendance: 8,534; Referee: Craig Hicks |
Note: Fixture was initially scheduled for a 15:00 kick-off, but was moved for live Sky Sports broadcast.

| 28 September 2024 8 | Cambridge United | 0–2 | Lincoln City | Cambridge |
| 15:00 BST | Nlundulu (yellow card) 38' | Report | Draper 26'; Makama (yellow card) 37'; Cadamarteri 68' (yellow card) 71'; Jackson (yellow card) 87' | Stadium: Cledara Abbey Stadium; Attendance: 6,969; Referee: Adam Herczeg |

| 1 October 2024 9 | Blackpool | 1–1 | Lincoln City | Blackpool |
| 19:45 BST | Joseph 74' | Report | McGrandles (yellow card) 17'; Makama (yellow card) 44'; Jackson (yellow card) 56' (yellow-red card) 70'; Darikwa (yellow card) 73'; Hamer 90+5' | Stadium: Bloomfield Road; Attendance: 8,528; Referee: Lewis Smith |
Note: Live on Sky Sports

| 5 October 2024 10 | Lincoln City | 2–1 | Leyton Orient | Lincoln |
| 15:00 BST | Erhahon (yellow card) 19'; Makama 47'; Roughan (yellow card) 66'; Jefferies (yellow card) 67'; Draper 77'; Hamilton (yellow card) 90+2' | Report | Simpson (yellow card) 30'; Ball (yellow card) 50'; Agyei 80'; Pratley (yellow card) 90+5' | Stadium: LNER Stadium; Attendance: 9,511; Referee: Ross Joyce |

| 19 October 2024 12 | Lincoln City | 1–3 | Birmingham City | Lincoln |
| 15:00 BST | Cadamarteri 1'; Hackett (penalty missed) 72' | Report | Anderson 14', 79'; Klarer (yellow card) 47'; Cochrane (yellow card) 50'; Willumsson 52'; Iwata (yellow card) 85' | Stadium: LNER Stadium; Attendance: 10,026; Referee: Simon Mather |

| 22 October 2024 13 | Crawley Town | 3–0 | Lincoln City | Crawley |
| 19:45 BST | Ibrahim (yellow card) 43'; Swan 46'; Darcy 73'; Holohan (yellow card) 89'; Hepburn-Murphy 90+5' | Report | O'Connor (yellow card) 81'; Roughan (yellow card) 87' | Stadium: Broadfield Stadium; Attendance: 3,221; Referee: Carl Brook |

| 26 October 2024 14 | Lincoln City | 2–1 | Stockport County | Lincoln |
| 15:00 BST | House 42'; Cadamarteri 66'; Jefferies (yellow card) 70' | Report | Olaofe 9' | Stadium: LNER Stadium; Attendance: 9,513; Referee: Ben Speedie |

| 29 October 2024 5 | Lincoln City | 2–1 | Northampton Town | Lincoln |
| 19:45 GMT | Hamer 18'; House (yellow card) 43'; Ring 88'; Draper (yellow card) 89'; Wickens (yellow card) 90+4' | Report | Fosu 2'; Baldwin (yellow card) 17'; Roberts (yellow card) 35' (yellow-red card) 75'; McGeehan (yellow card) 62'; Guthrie (yellow card) 90+3'; Guinness-Walker (yellow card) 90+4' | Stadium: LNER Stadium; Attendance: 8,219; Referee: Ollie Yates |
Note: Fixture was previously postponed due to international call-ups.

| 9 November 2024 15 | Bristol Rovers | 1–1 | Lincoln City | Bristol |
| 15:00 GMT | Forde 35', (yellow card) 74'; Wilson (yellow card) 45+2'; Moore (yellow card) 48'; Martin (yellow card) 61' | Report | Moylan (yellow card) 62', (goal) 64'; Montsma (yellow card) 90' | Stadium: Memorial Ground; Attendance: 7,262; Referee: Dale Baines |

| 16 November 2024 16 | Exeter City | 0–0 | Lincoln City | Exeter |
| 12:30 GMT | Woods (yellow card) 66' (yellow-red card) 90'; Sweeney (yellow card) 72' | Report | McGrandles (yellow card) 13'; House (yellow card) 44' | Stadium: St James Park; Attendance: 5,950; Referee: Thomas Parsons |
Note: Fixture was initially scheduled for a 15:00 kick-off, but was moved for live Sky Sports broadcast.

| 23 November 2024 17 | Lincoln City | 2–3 | Wycombe Wanderers | Lincoln |
| 15:00 GMT | Darikwa 14', 87', (yellow card) 39'; O'Connor (yellow card) 16'; Wickens (yellow card) 76'; House (yellow card) 79' | Report | Taylor (yellow card) 33'; Kone 35'; Onyedinma 43'; Leahy (penalty missed) 65'; Low 72' | Stadium: LNER Stadium; Attendance: 8,558; Referee: Seb Stockbridge |

| 26 November 2024 11 | Wrexham | 1–0 | Lincoln City | Wrexham |
| 19:45 GMT | Brunt (yellow card) 11'; Darikwa 67' (o.g.) | Report | | Stadium: STōK Cae Ras; Attendance: 11,786; Referee: Jacob Miles |

| 3 December 2024 18 | Rotherham United | 2–1 | Lincoln City | Rotherham |
| 19:45 GMT | Nombe 21'; Jules (yellow card) 48'; Rafferty (yellow card) 56'; Raggett 77'; Odoffin (yellow card) 90+6' | Report | Makama 50'; Darikwa (yellow card) 60'; Erhahon (yellow card) 68'; Hackett (yellow card) 90+7'; Draper (yellow card) 90+8' | Stadium: AESSEAL New York Stadium; Attendance: 8,995; Referee: Martin Woods |

| 7 December 2024 19 | Lincoln City | 0–0 | Charlton Athletic | Lincoln |
| 12:30 GMT | | Report | Kanu (yellow card) 18'; Jones (yellow card) 27' | Stadium: LNER Stadium; Attendance: 8,307; Referee: Paul Howard |
Note: Fixture was initially scheduled for a 15:00 kick-off, but was moved for live Sky Sports broadcast.

| 14 December 2024 20 | Huddersfield Town | 2–2 | Lincoln City | Huddersfield |
| 15:00 GMT | Spencer 49'; Marshall 89'; Lonwijk (yellow card) 90+6' | Report | House 15'; Cadamarteri 25'; Darikwa (yellow card) 59'; Wickens (yellow card) 75' | Stadium: John Smith's Stadium; Attendance: 18,675; Referee: Alan Young |

| 21 December 2024 21 | Lincoln City | 2–0 | Reading | Lincoln |
| 12:30 GMT | Cadamarteri 8'; House (yellow card) 55'; Hackett 72'; O'Connor (yellow card) 78' | Report | Holzman (red card) 37'; Dean (yellow card) 55' | Stadium: LNER Stadium; Attendance: 9,396; Referee: Adam Herczeg |
Note: Fixture was initially scheduled for a 15:00 kick-off, but was moved for live Sky Sports broadcast.

| 26 December 2024 22 | Shrewsbury Town | 1–0 | Lincoln City | Shrewsbury |
| 15:00 GMT | Feeney 9', (yellow card) 34'; Perry (yellow card) 28'; Benning (yellow card) 61'; Marquis (penalty missed) 89' | Report | O'Connor (yellow card) 4'; Erhahon (yellow card) 32'; Hackett (yellow card) 71'; Duffy (yellow card) 88' | Stadium: The Croud Meadow; Attendance: 6,369; Referee: Declan Bourne |
Note: Live on Sky Sports

| 29 December 2024 23 | Bolton Wanderers | 3–0 | Lincoln City | Horwich |
| 15:00 GMT | Collins 36'; Matete 50', 66' | Report | McGrandeles (yellow card) 18'; House (yellow card) 23'; O'Connor (yellow card) 44'; Erhahon (yellow card) 45+1' (yellow-red card) 45+3' | Stadium: Toughsheet Community Stadium; Attendance: 22,395; Referee: Ross Joyce |

| 1 January 2025 24 | Lincoln City | 0–1 | Rotherham United | Lincoln |
| 15:00 GMT | | Report | Rafferty (yellow card) 75'; Powell 85' | Stadium: LNER Stadium; Attendance: 9,222; Referee: Ben Speedie |
Note: Live on Sky Sports

| 4 January 2025 25 | Lincoln City | 0–0 | Stevenage | Lincoln |
| 15:00 GMT | Montsma (yellow card) 10'; Darikwa (yellow card) 54' | Report | Kemp (yellow card) 84' | Stadium: LNER Stadium; Attendance: 8,220; Referee: Scott Tallis |

| 18 January 2025 27 | Northampton Town | 0–1 | Lincoln City | Sixfields |
| 14:00 GMT | Eyoma (yellow card) 59'; Fosu (yellow card) 64' | Report | Darikwa 38'; House (yellow card) 70' | Stadium: Sixfields Stadium; Attendance: 6,094; Referee: Craig Hicks |
Note: Fixture was initially scheduled for a 15:00 kick-off, but was moved due to the Northampton Saints also having a home game that afternoon.

| 25 January 2025 28 | Lincoln City | 5–1 | Peterborough United | Lincoln |
| 15:00 GMT | Jefferies 12'; Bayliss 33', (yellow card) 39'; Draper 55' (pen.); Hayes 66' (o.g.); O'Connor (yellow card) 73'; Collins 82' | Report | Johnston (yellow card) 37' de Havilland (yellow card) 56'; Jones 60'; Susoho (yellow card) 62' | Stadium: LNER Stadium; Attendance: 10,014; Referee: Simon Mather |

| 28 January 2025 29 | Lincoln City | 0–2 | Blackpool | Lincoln |
| 19:45 GMT | | Report | Fletcher 32'; Morgan (yellow card) 52'; Casey 57'; Baggott (yellow card) 86'; Husband (yellow card) 90+4' | Stadium: LNER Stadium; Attendance: 7,517; Referee: Jeremy Simpson |
Note: Live on Sky Sports

| 1 February 2025 30 | Wigan Athletic | 1–1 | Lincoln City | Wigan |
| 15:00 GMT | J. Smith 36'; S. Smith (yellow card) 44'; McHugh (yellow card) 45'; Weir (yellow card) 51'; Tickle (yellow card) 77'; Sibbick (yellow card) 89' | Report | Makama (yellow card) 20'; Collins (yellow card) 31', (penalty missed) 88', 88' | Stadium: Brick Community Stadium; Attendance: 8,606; Referee: John Mulligan |

| 8 February 2025 31 | Lincoln City | 1–1 | Cambridge United | Lincoln |
| 15:00 GMT | Draper 17'; Roughan (yellow card) 35'; McGrandles (yellow card) 82'; Jackson (yellow card) 84'; Gardner (red card) 86'; House (yellow card) 87' | Report | Gibbons 42'; Okedina (yellow card) 90+3' | Stadium: LNER Stadium; Attendance: 8,606; Referee: Steven Copeland |

| 15 February 2025 32 | Leyton Orient | 3–2 | Lincoln City | Leyton |
| 15:00 GMT | Perkins 17', 28'; Kelman 90+2' | Report | Jefferies (yellow card) 20'; Montsma 45+7'; O'Connor (yellow card) 61'; Collins 75' | Stadium: Gaughan Group Stadium; Attendance: 7,967; Referee: Matthew Corlett |

| 18 February 2025 26 | Mansfield Town | 0–3 | Lincoln City | Mansfield |
| 19:45 GMT | Baccus (yellow card) 45'; Maris (yellow card) 90' | Report | O'Connor 9'; Makama (yellow card) 66'; Clucas 83', (yellow card) 83'; Jefferies 89'; Jeacock (yellow card) 90+5' | Stadium: One Call Stadium; Attendance: 8,326; Referee: Lee Swabey |
Note: Live on Sky Sports

| 22 February 2025 33 | Lincoln City | 0–1 | Burton Albion | Lincoln |
| 15:00 GMT | O'Connor (yellow card) 49'; Hamilton (yellow card) 82'; Bayliss (yellow card) 90' | Report | Kalinauskas (yellow card) 70'; Dodgson (yellow card) 87'; Webster 90+2' | Stadium: LNER Stadium; Attendance: 8,507; Referee: Ruebyn Ricardo |

| 1 March 2025 34 | Barnsley | 4–3 | Lincoln City | Barnsley |
| 15:00 GMT | Keillor-Dunn 14'; O'Keeffe (yellow card) 25'; Phillips 33'; Gent 53'; Watters 76' | Report | Jefferies (yellow card) 63'; Darikwa 67'; Hackett 84'; Makama 90+2' | Stadium: Oakwell; Referee: Scott Oldham |

| 4 March 2025 35 | Lincoln City | 4–1 | Crawley Town | Lincoln |
| 19:45 GMT | Collins 14'; Makama 24'; Jefferies 32'; Gardner 88' | Report | Doyle 6'; Radcliffe (yellow card) 85' | Stadium: LNER Stadium; Attendance: 7,253; Referee: Josh Smith |
Note: Live on Sky Sports

| 8 March 2025 36 | Birmingham City | 1–0 | Lincoln City | Bordesley |
| 15:00 GMT | Stansfield (yellow card) 23'; Klarer (yellow card) 32'; Allsop (yellow card) 45+1'; Dowell 71' (pen.) | Report | McGrandles (yellow card) 85' | Stadium: St. Andrew's @ Knighthead Park; Attendance: 26,210; Referee: David Rock |

| 15 March 2025 37 | Lincoln City | 5–0 | Bristol Rovers | Lincoln |
| 15:00 GMT | Makama 31', 65', 81'; Bayliss 49'; Collins 52' | Report | Wilson (yellow card) 83' | Stadium: LNER Stadium; Attendance: 8,506; Referee: Paul Howard |

| 22 March 2025 38 | Lincoln City | 0–0 | Exeter City | Lincoln |
| 15:00 GMT | Hackett (yellow card) 50'; Collins (yellow card) 81' | | Turns (yellow card) 4'; Whitworth (yellow card) 34'; Magennis (yellow card) 37'; Hartridge (yellow card) 89' | Stadium: LNER Stadium; Attendance: 8,971; Referee: Declan Bourne |

| 29 March 2025 39 | Wycombe Wanderers | 1–0 | Lincoln City | High Wycombe |
| 15:00 GMT | Humphreys 66'; Leahy (yellow card) 90+2' | Report | Makama (yellow card) 16'; Bayliss (yellow card) 51'; O'Connor (red card) 90+4' | Stadium: Adams Park; Attendance: 4,939; Referee: Scott Jackson |

| 1 April 2025 40 | Lincoln City | 1–0 | Huddersfield Town | Lincoln |
| 19:45 BST | Hackett 35' | Report | | Stadium: LNER Stadium; Attendance: 8,755; Referee: Ruebyn Ricardo |
Note: Live on Sky Sports

| 5 April 2025 41 | Charlton Athletic | 2–2 | Lincoln City | Charlton |
| 15:00 BST | Gillesphey 56'; Docherty 75'; Aneke (yellow card) 78' | Report | Collins 17', 49'; Wickens (yellow card) 72'; McGrandles (yellow card) 90+2'; Jackson (yellow card) 90+3' | Stadium: The Valley; Attendance: 15,611; Referee: Leigh Doughty |

| 12 April 2025 42 | Lincoln City | 1–1 | Shrewsbury Town | Lincoln |
| 15:00 BST | Bayliss 4' | Report | Pierre 23'; Gape (yellow card) 85' | Stadium: LNER Stadium; Attendance: 9,282; Referee: Stephen Parkinson |

| 18 April 2025 43 | Reading | 0–1 | Lincoln City | Reading |
| 15:00 BST | Mbengue (yellow card) 41'; Ehibhatiomhan (yellow card) 59'; Camará (yellow card) 64'; Yiadom (yellow card) 72' | Report | Bayliss (yellow card) 22'; Collins 65'; House (yellow card) 78'; Hamilton (yellow card) 87'; Darikwa (yellow card) 90+6' | Stadium: Select Car Leasing Stadium; Attendance: 16,388; Referee: Ben Speedie |

| 21 April 2025 44 | Lincoln City | 4–2 | Bolton Wanderers | Lincoln |
| 15:00 BST | Ring 10'; Collins 18' (pen.), 53'; Hackett 61'; Hamer (yellow card) 64'; House (yellow card) 73' | Report | Matete 29'; Jones (yellow card) 36'; Murphy 38'; Dacres-Cogley (yellow card) 90' (yellow-red card) 90+2' | Stadium: LNER Stadium; Attendance: 10,240; Referee: Jacob Miles |

| 26 April 2025 45 | Stockport County | 3–2 | Lincoln City | Edgeley |
| 15:00 BST | Fevrier 48'; Collar 78'; Olaofe 81' | Report | House (yellow card) 14', (goal) 24'; Ring 43'; Erhahon (yellow card) 68'; McGrandles (yellow card) 82' | Stadium: Edgeley Park; Attendance: 9,770; Referee: Farai Hallam |

| 3 May 2025 46 | Lincoln City | 0–2 | Wrexham | Lincoln |
| 15:00 BST | Hackett (yellow card) 71' | Report | Lee 53'; Longman 61', (yellow card) 62'; McClean (yellow card) 65' | Stadium: LNER Stadium; Attendance: 10,347; Referee: Thomas Kirk |

=== FA Cup ===
Lincoln City were drawn away against Chesham United in the first round to Crawley Town in the second round and to Birmingham City in the third round.

| 4 November 2024 First round | Chesham United | 0–4 | Lincoln City | Chesham |
| 19:15 GMT | | Report | Moylan 44'; Makama 49'; McGrandles 65'; Adebiyi 87' (o.g.) | Stadium: The Meadow; Attendance: 3,963; Referee: Alex Chilowicz |
Note: Live on ITV4.

| 30 November 2024 Second round | Crawley Town | 3–4 | Lincoln City | Crawley |
| 15:00 GMT | Roles 10'; Showunmi 13'; John Jules (yellow card) 22'; Kelly 82' | Report | O'Connor 19'; Makama 39'; Ring 47'; Moylan 48'; Wickens (yellow card) 90+5' | Stadium: Broadfield Stadium; Attendance: 2,831; Referee: Sunny Gill |

| 11 January 2025 Third round | Birmingham City | 2–1 | Lincoln City | Bordesley |
| 12:00 GMT | Yokoyama 1'; Dykes 77' | Report | Montsma (yellow card) 83'; Makama 90' (pen.) | Stadium: St Andrew's; Attendance: 17,042; Referee: Martin Coy |

=== EFL Cup ===
Lincoln City were drawn against Harrogate Town in the first round on 27 June 2024.

| 13 August 2024 First round | Lincoln City | 1–2 | Harrogate Town | Lincoln |
| 19:45 BST | Moylan (yellow card) 57'; Makama 85' (pen.) | Report | Folarin 49'; Sutton (yellow card) 56'; Daly 61' | Stadium: LNER Stadium; Attendance: 3,507; Referee: Scott Tallis |
Note: Live on Sky Sports

=== EFL Trophy ===
The Imps were drawn into Group G of the Northern section alongside Chesterfield, Grimsby Town and Manchester City U21. In the round of 32, they were drawn away to Morecambe. In the round of 16, they were drawn at home to Bolton Wanderers.

==== Group stage ====
| Pos | Div | Team | Pld | W | PW | PL | L | GF | GA | GD | Pts | Qualification |
|---|---|---|---|---|---|---|---|---|---|---|---|---|
| 1 | L2 | Chesterfield | 3 | 2 | 1 | 0 | 0 | 5 | 3 | +2 | 8 | Advance to Round 2 |
| 2 | L1 | Lincoln City | 3 | 2 | 0 | 0 | 1 | 7 | 2 | +5 | 6 | Advance to Round 2 |
| 3 | ACA | Manchester City U21 | 3 | 0 | 1 | 1 | 1 | 2 | 7 | −5 | 3 | |
| 4 | L2 | Grimsby Town | 3 | 0 | 0 | 1 | 2 | 4 | 6 | −2 | 1 | |

Source: EFL

| 3 September 2024 Group stage | Lincoln City | 0–1 | Chesterfield | Lincoln |
| 19:00 BST | Erhahon (yellow card) 60'; O'Connor (yellow card) 69'; Gallagher (yellow card) 74'; Jefferies (yellow card) 80'; Earley (yellow card) 87' | Report | Jones (yellow card) 27'; Daley-Campbell (yellow card) 46'; Cook 55'; Oldaker (yellow card) 74' | Stadium: LNER Stadium; Attendance: 2,208; Referee: Ruebyn Ricardo |
Note: Live on Sky Sports

| 8 October 2024 Group stage | Grimsby Town | 1–2 | Lincoln City | Cleethorpes |
| 19:30 BST | Ainley (yellow card) 21'; Svanþórsson 58' | Report | Earley (yellow card) 42'; Cadamarteri 66'; Erhahon (yellow card) 90+3'; Moylan 90+4' | Stadium: Blundell Park; Attendance: 1,270; Referee: Oliver Mackey |
Note: Live on Sky Sports

| 12 November 2024 Group stage | Lincoln City | 5–0 | Manchester City U21 | Lincoln |
| 19:00 GMT | Draper 6'; Cadamarteri 41'; Moylan (yellow card) 45+3'; Street 49'; Okoro 60'; McKiernan 65'; House (yellow card) 89' | Report | Alfa-Ruprecht (yellow card) 28' | Stadium: LNER Stadium; Attendance: 3,055; Referee: Aaron Bannister |
Note: Fixture was initially scheduled or 24 September, but was moved at the request of Manchester City.

==== Knockout stages ====
| 10 December 2024 Round of 32 | Morecambe | 0–1 | Lincoln City | Morecambe |
| 19:00 GMT | | Report | Cadamarteri 19'; Street (yellow card) 90' | Stadium: Mazuma Mobile Stadium; Attendance: 496; Referee: Michael Barlow |
Note: Live on Sky Sports

| 14 January 2025 Round of 16 | Lincoln City | 0–1 | Bolton Wanderers | Lincoln |
| 19:00 GMT | Erhahon (yellow card) 82' | Report | Collins 21'; Dacres-Cogley (yellow card) 35'; Santos (yellow card) 51'; Matete (yellow card) 56'; Schön (yellow card) 90+2' | Stadium: LNER Stadium; Attendance: 2,252; Referee: Thomas Parsons |
Note: Live on Sky Sports

== Transfers & contracts ==
=== In ===
| Date | Pos | Player | From | Fee | Ref |
|---|---|---|---|---|---|
| 14 June 2024 | CM | (Scotland) Conor McGrandles | (England) Charlton Athletic | Undisclosed | |
| 1 July 2024 (Note: The transfer was announced on 21 June, and would become official on July 1 once his Shrewsbury Town contract expired) | CM | (England) Tom Bayliss | (England) Shrewsbury Town | Free | |
| 1 July 2024 | CM | (Northern Ireland) JJ McKiernan | (England) Morecambe | Nominal Fee | |
| 1 July 2024 (Note: The transfer was announced on 17 June, and would become official on July 1 once his Cheltenham Town contract expired) | GK | (England) Jamie Pardington | (England) Cheltenham Town | Free | |
| 2 July 2024 | CF | (England) Rob Street | (England) Cheltenham Town | Undisclosed | |
| 3 July 2024 | GK | (England) Zach Jeacock | (England) Birmingham City | Free | |
| 5 July 2024 | RB | (Zimbabwe) Tendayi Darikwa | (Cyprus) Apollon Limassol | Free | |
| 18 July 2024 | CM | (Wales) Dom Jefferies | (England) Gillingham | Undisclosed | |
| 19 July 2024 | CB | (England) Tom Hamer | (England) Burton Albion | Undisclosed | |
| 20 July 2024 | GK | (England) George Wickens | (England) Fulham | Nominal Fee | |
| 23 August 2024 | LW | (Sweden) Erik Ring | (Sweden) AIK | Undisclosed | |
| 17 January 2025 | CM | (England) Sam Clucas | (England) Oldham Athletic | Undisclosed | |
| 20 January 2025 | CF | (Republic of Ireland) James Collins | (England) Derby County | Undisclosed | |

=== Out ===
| Date | Pos | Player | To | Fee | Ref |
|---|---|---|---|---|---|
| 14 June 2024 | GK | (England) Jordan Wright | (England) Grimsby Town | Undisclosed | |
| 18 June 2024 | WB | (Denmark) Lasse Sørensen | (England) Huddersfield Town | Undisclosed | |
| 25 June 2024 | LB | (England) Jaden Brown | (Scotland) St Mirren | Undisclosed | |
| 3 July 2024 | GK | (Scotland) Sam Long | (England) Bromley | Undisclosed | |
| 11 July 2024 | GK | (Denmark) Lukas Jensen | (England) Millwall | Undisclosed | |
| 31 January 2025 | LM | (Republic of Ireland) Dylan Duffy | (England) Chesterfield | Undisclosed | |

=== Loaned in ===
| Date | Pos | Player | Loaned from | Date until | Ref |
|---|---|---|---|---|---|
| 28 August 2024 | CF | (England) Bailey Cadamarteri | (England) Sheffield Wednesday | End of season | |
| 30 August 2024 | LB | (England) Saxon Earley | (England) Plymouth Argyle | 14 January 2025 (Note: Saxon Earley was recalled from his loan on 14 January 2025) | |
| 31 January 2024 | CF | (Republic of Ireland) Joe Gardner | (England) Nottingham Forest | End of season | |

=== Loaned out ===
| Date | Pos | Player | Loaned to | Date until | Ref |
|---|---|---|---|---|---|
| 1 July 2024 | CM | (England) Alistair Smith | (England) AFC Wimbledon | End of season | |
| 1 August 2024 | CB | (England) Zak Bradshaw | (England) Tranmere Rovers | End of season | |
| 2 August 2024 | CB | (England) MJ Kamson-Kamara | (England) Peterborough Sports | 18 February 2025 (Note: MJ Kamson-Kamara was in the Lincoln squad against Mansfield Town on 18 February 2025. No reference to his recall seen) | |
| 9 August 2024 | CM | (Republic of Ireland) Oisin Gallagher | (England) Peterborough Sports | 9 January 2025 (Note: Oisin Gallagher was recalled from his loan on 9 January 2025) | |
| 30 August 2024 | RB | (England) Jay Benn | (England) Bradford City | End of season | |
| 18 October 2024 | GK | (England) Zach Jeacock | (England) Southend United | 9 January 2025 | |
| 3 January 2025 | CF | (England) Rob Street | (England) Doncaster Rovers | End of season | |
| 9 January 2025 | CM | (Republic of Ireland) Oisin Gallagher | (England) Boston United | End of season | |
| 10 January 2025 | CM | (Northern Ireland) JJ McKiernan | (England) Burton Albion | End of season | |
| 10 January 2025 | CM | (England) Denny Oliver | (England) Grantham Town | Work experience | |
| 10 January 2025 | CM | (England) Gbolahan Okewoye | (England) Grantham Town | Work experience (Note: Gbolahan Okewoye joined Lincoln United on 24 January 2025) | |
| 15 January 2025 | CB | (England) Charlie Parks | (England) Grantham Town | Work experience | |
| 24 January 2025 | CM | (England) Gbolahan Okewoye | (England) Lincoln United | End of season (Note: On 25 February, Okewoye's work experience loan was extended until the end of the season) | |
| 27 January 2025 | LM | (Republic of Ireland) Dylan Duffy | (England) Chesterfield | 31 January 2025 (Note: On 31 January, Duffy joined Chesterfield on a permanent basis) | |
| 31 January 2025 | RB | (England) Kelly Fombad | (England) Lincoln United | End of season (Note: On 25 February, Fombad's work experience loan was extended until the end of the season) | |
| 31 January 2025 | CF | (England) Dakara Wifa | (England) Skegness Town | Work experience | |
| 8 March 2025 | CB | (England) MJ Kamson-Kamara | (England) Peterborough Sports | End of season | |
| 14 March 2025 | CF | (England) Tyler Walker | (England) Wealdstone | End of season | |
| 21 March 2025 | GK | (England) Jamie Pardington | (England) Peterborough Sports | 18 April 2025 | |

=== Released / Out of Contract ===
| Date | Pos | Player | Subsequent club | Join date | Ref |
|---|---|---|---|---|---|
| 30 June 2024 | RB | (England) Elicha Ahui | (Republic of Ireland) Drogheda United | 1 July 2024 | |
| 30 June 2024 | CB | (England) Hayden Cann | (Republic of Ireland) Dundalk | 1 July 2024 | |
| 30 June 2024 | CM | (England) Teddy Bishop | (England) Colchester United | 7 August 2024 | |
| 30 June 2024 | CM | (Republic of Ireland) Danny Mandroiu | (Republic of Ireland) Shamrock Rovers | 19 August 2024 | |
| 30 June 2024 | RW | (England) Hakeeb Adelakun | (England) Salford City | 30 August 2024 | |
| 30 June 2024 | CB | (England) TJ Eyoma | (England) Northampton Town | 1 November 2024 | |

=== Contracts ===
| Date | Pos. | Player | Length | Expiry | Ref. |
|---|---|---|---|---|---|
| 9 July 2024 | CB | (Netherlands) Lewis Montsma | 6 months | January 2025 | |
| 11 October 2024 | CF | (England) Jovon Makama | 3 years | June 2027 | |
| 23 December 2024 | CB | (Netherlands) Lewis Montsma | 2.5 years | June 2027 | |
| 3 January 2025 | RB | (Zimbabwe) Tendayi Darikwa | 1.5 years | June 2026 | |
| 6 February 2025 | CF | (England) Freddie Draper | 3.5 years | June 2028 | |
| 13 May 2025 | CF | (Scotland) Ben House | One-year option | June 2026 | |
| 13 May 2025 | CB | (England) Adam Jackson | One-year option | June 2026 | |
| 13 May 2025 | CM | (England) Gbolahan Okewoye | 1 year | June 2026 | |
| 13 May 2025 | CB | (England) Charlie Parks | 2 years | June 2027 | |

== Squad statistics ==
=== Appearances ===
As of 3 May 2025

| No. | Pos | Nat | Player | Total | | League One | | FA Cup | | EFL Cup | | EFL Trophy | |
| No. | Pos | Nat | Player | Apps | Goals | Apps | Goals | Apps | Goals | Apps | Goals | Apps | Goals |
|---|---|---|---|---|---|---|---|---|---|---|---|---|---|
| 1 | GK | (England) ENG | George Wickens | 39 | 0 | 36 | 0 | 2 | 0 | 0 | 0 | 1 | 0 |
| 2 | DF | (Zimbabwe) ZIM | Tendayi Darikwa | 50 | 5 | 44 | 5 | 3 | 0 | 0 | 0 | 3 | 0 |
| 4 | DF | (Netherlands) NED | Lewis Montsma | 21 | 1 | 12+4 | 1 | 2 | 0 | 1 | 0 | 2 | 0 |
| 5 | DF | (England) ENG | Adam Jackson | 31 | 2 | 26+1 | 2 | 0+1 | 0 | 0+1 | 0 | 2 | 0 |
| 6 | MF | (Scotland) SCO | Ethan Erhahon | 38 | 0 | 28+3 | 0 | 2 | 0 | 1 | 0 | 2+2 | 0 |
| 7 | FW | (Saint Lucia) LCA | Reeco Hackett | 39 | 4 | 23+10 | 4 | 1+2 | 0 | 0 | 0 | 1+2 | 0 |
| 8 | MF | (England) ENG | Tom Bayliss | 39 | 3 | 22+12 | 3 | 0+1 | 0 | 0+1 | 0 | 1+2 | 0 |
| 9 | FW | (England) ENG | Bailey Cadamarteri | 31 | 8 | 13+10 | 5 | 1+2 | 0 | 0 | 0 | 3+2 | 3 |
| 11 | MF | (Scotland) SCO | Ethan Hamilton | 39 | 0 | 16+16 | 0 | 1+2 | 0 | 0 | 0 | 3+1 | 0 |
| 12 | MF | (Sweden) SWE | Erik Ring | 30 | 4 | 9+15 | 3 | 2+1 | 1 | 0 | 0 | 3 | 0 |
| 14 | MF | (Scotland) SCO | Conor McGrandles | 45 | 1 | 36+6 | 0 | 2 | 1 | 0 | 0 | 0+1 | 0 |
| 15 | DF | (Republic of Ireland) IRL | Paudie O'Connor | 45 | 4 | 38+1 | 3 | 3 | 1 | 1 | 0 | 2 | 0 |
| 16 | MF | (Wales) WAL | Dom Jefferies | 43 | 3 | 24+10 | 3 | 1+2 | 0 | 1 | 0 | 2+3 | 0 |
| 18 | FW | (Scotland) SCO | Ben House | 44 | 6 | 34+7 | 6 | 0 | 0 | 0+1 | 0 | 0+2 | 0 |
| 21 | GK | (England) ENG | Jamie Pardington | 2 | 0 | 0 | 0 | 0 | 0 | 0 | 0 | 2 | 0 |
| 22 | DF | (England) ENG | Tom Hamer | 26 | 2 | 14+9 | 2 | 0 | 0 | 1 | 0 | 2 | 0 |
| 23 | DF | (Republic of Ireland) IRL | Sean Roughan | 52 | 1 | 46 | 1 | 3 | 0 | 0 | 0 | 2+1 | 0 |
| 24 | MF | (England) ENG | Sam Clucas | 8 | 1 | 2+6 | 1 | 0 | 0 | 0 | 0 | 0 | 0 |
| 25 | FW | (Republic of Ireland) IRL | James Collins | 20 | 10 | 14+6 | 10 | 0 | 0 | 0 | 0 | 0 | 0 |
| 27 | FW | (England) ENG | Jovon Makama | 45 | 11 | 29+9 | 7 | 3 | 3 | 0+1 | 1 | 1+2 | 0 |
| 28 | MF | (Republic of Ireland) IRL | Jack Moylan | 36 | 5 | 11+17 | 2 | 3 | 2 | 1 | 0 | 4 | 1 |
| 31 | GK | (England) ENG | Zach Jeacock | 15 | 0 | 10+1 | 0 | 1 | 0 | 1 | 0 | 2 | 0 |
| 32 | FW | (Republic of Ireland) IRL | Joe Gardner | 11 | 1 | 4+7 | 1 | 0 | 0 | 0 | 0 | 0 | 0 |
| 34 | FW | (England) ENG | Freddie Draper | 47 | 5 | 10+28 | 4 | 2+1 | 0 | 1 | 0 | 4+1 | 1 |
| 36 | FW | (United States) USA | Zane Okoro | 4 | 1 | 0+2 | 0 | 0+1 | 0 | 0 | 0 | 1 | 1 |
Players out on loan:
| 10 | MF | (Northern Ireland) NIR | JJ McKiernan | 17 | 1 | 2+10 | 0 | 1+1 | 0 | 1 | 0 | 2 | 1 |
| 19 | FW | (England) ENG | Tyler Walker | 1 | 0 | 0 | 0 | 0 | 0 | 0 | 0 | 0+1 | 0 |
| 20 | DF | (England) ENG | Jay Benn | 1 | 0 | 0 | 0 | 0 | 0 | 1 | 0 | 0 | 0 |
| 26 | MF | (Republic of Ireland) IRL | Oisin Gallagher | 4 | 0 | 0 | 0 | 0 | 0 | 0 | 0 | 3+1 | 0 |
| 29 | FW | (England) ENG | Rob Street | 11 | 1 | 0+6 | 0 | 0 | 0 | 1 | 0 | 3+1 | 1 |
| 35 | DF | (England) ENG | MJ Kamson-Kamara | 1 | 0 | 0 | 0 | 0 | 0 | 0 | 0 | 0+1 | 0 |
Players that left the club mid-season:
| 3 | DF | (England) ENG | Saxon Earley | 3 | 0 | 0 | 0 | 0+1 | 0 | 0 | 0 | 1+1 | 0 |
| 17 | MF | (Republic of Ireland) IRL | Dylan Duffy | 13 | 0 | 3+5 | 0 | 0 | 0 | 0+1 | 0 | 3+1 | 0 |

=== Goalscorers ===
As of 3 May 2025

| Rank | Pos. | Nat. | No. | Player | League One | FA Cup | EFL Cup | EFL Trophy | Total |
|---|---|---|---|---|---|---|---|---|---|
| 1 | FW | (England) | 27 | Jovon Makama | 7 | 3 | 1 | 0 | 11 |
| 2 | FW | (Republic of Ireland) | 25 | James Collins | 10 | 0 | 0 | 0 | 10 |
| 3 | FW | (England) | 9 | Bailey Cadamarteri | 5 | 0 | 0 | 3 | 8 |
| 4 | FW | (Scotland) | 18 | Ben House | 6 | 0 | 0 | 0 | 6 |
| 5 | DF | (Zimbabwe) | 2 | Tendayi Darikwa | 5 | 0 | 0 | 0 | 5 |
| 5 | MF | (Republic of Ireland) | 28 | Jack Moylan | 2 | 2 | 0 | 1 | 5 |
| 5 | FW | (England) | 34 | Freddie Draper | 4 | 0 | 0 | 1 | 5 |
| 6 | FW | (Saint Lucia) | 7 | Reeco Hackett | 4 | 0 | 0 | 0 | 4 |
| 6 | MF | (Sweden) | 12 | Erik Ring | 3 | 1 | 0 | 0 | 4 |
| 6 | DF | (Republic of Ireland) | 15 | Paudie O'Connor | 3 | 1 | 0 | 0 | 4 |
| 7 | MF | (England) | 8 | Tom Bayliss | 3 | 0 | 0 | 0 | 3 |
| 7 | MF | (Wales) | 16 | Dom Jefferies | 3 | 0 | 0 | 0 | 3 |
| 8 | DF | (England) | 5 | Adam Jackson | 2 | 0 | 0 | 0 | 2 |
| 8 | DF | (England) | 22 | Tom Hamer | 2 | 0 | 0 | 0 | 2 |
| 9 | DF | (Netherlands) | 4 | Lewis Montsma | 1 | 0 | 0 | 0 | 1 |
| 9 | MF | (Northern Ireland) | 10 | JJ McKiernan | 0 | 0 | 0 | 1 | 1 |
| 9 | MF | (Scotland) | 14 | Conor McGrandles | 0 | 1 | 0 | 0 | 1 |
| 9 | DF | (Republic of Ireland) | 23 | Sean Roughan | 1 | 0 | 0 | 0 | 1 |
| 9 | MF | (England) | 24 | Sam Clucas | 1 | 0 | 0 | 0 | 1 |
| 9 | FW | (England) | 29 | Rob Street | 0 | 0 | 0 | 1 | 1 |
| 9 | FW | (Republic of Ireland) | 32 | Joe Gardner | 1 | 0 | 0 | 0 | 1 |
| 9 | FW | (United States) | 36 | Zane Okoro | 0 | 0 | 0 | 1 | 1 |
| 9 | Own goals | | | | 1 | 1 | 0 | 0 | 2 |
| Total | | | | | 64 | 9 | 1 | 8 | 82 |

=== Assists ===
As of 3 May 2025

| Rank | Pos. | Nat. | No. | Player | League One | FA Cup | EFL Cup | EFL Trophy | Total |
|---|---|---|---|---|---|---|---|---|---|
| 1 | FW | (England) | 27 | Jovon Makama | 6 | 0 | 0 | 0 | 6 |
| 2 | DF | (Zimbabwe) | 2 | Tendayi Darikwa | 4 | 1 | 0 | 0 | 5 |
| 2 | DF | (Republic of Ireland) | 15 | Paudie O'Connor | 5 | 0 | 0 | 0 | 5 |
| 2 | DF | (Republic of Ireland) | 23 | Sean Roughan | 3 | 0 | 0 | 2 | 5 |
| 3 | MF | (England) | 8 | Tom Bayliss | 4 | 0 | 0 | 0 | 4 |
| 3 | MF | (Wales) | 16 | Dom Jefferies | 3 | 0 | 0 | 1 | 4 |
| 4 | FW | (Saint Lucia) | 7 | Reeco Hackett | 3 | 0 | 0 | 0 | 3 |
| 4 | MF | (Sweden) | 12 | Erik Ring | 2 | 1 | 0 | 0 | 3 |
| 4 | FW | (Scotland) | 18 | Ben House | 3 | 0 | 0 | 0 | 3 |
| 4 | MF | (Republic of Ireland) | 28 | Jack Moylan | 0 | 1 | 0 | 2 | 3 |
| 5 | DF | (England) | 5 | Adam Jackson | 2 | 0 | 0 | 0 | 2 |
| 6 | DF | (Netherlands) | 4 | Lewis Montsma | 1 | 0 | 0 | 0 | 1 |
| 6 | MF | (Scotland) | 6 | Ethan Erhahon | 1 | 0 | 0 | 0 | 1 |
| 6 | MF | (Northern Ireland) | 10 | JJ McKiernan | 0 | 0 | 0 | 1 | 1 |
| 6 | MF | (Scotland) | 11 | Ethan Hamilton | 1 | 0 | 0 | 0 | 1 |
| 6 | MF | (Republic of Ireland) | 17 | Dylan Duffy | 0 | 0 | 0 | 1 | 1 |
| 6 | DF | (England) | 22 | Tom Hamer | 1 | 0 | 0 | 0 | 1 |
| 6 | FW | (England) | 34 | Freddie Draper | 0 | 1 | 0 | 0 | 1 |
| Total | | | | | 39 | 4 | 0 | 7 | 50 |

=== Disciplinary record ===
As of 3 May 2025

| No. | Pos. | Player | League One | | FA Cup | | EFL Cup | | EFL Trophy | | Total | |
| No. | Pos. | Player | Yellow card | Red card | Yellow card | Red card | Yellow card | Red card | Yellow card | Red card | Yellow card | Red card |
|---|---|---|---|---|---|---|---|---|---|---|---|---|
| 1 | GK | George Wickens | 4 | 0 | 1 | 0 | 0 | 0 | 0 | 0 | 5 | 0 |
| 2 | DF | Tendayi Darikwa | 8 | 0 | 0 | 0 | 0 | 0 | 0 | 0 | 8 | 0 |
| 3 | DF | Saxon Earley | 0 | 0 | 0 | 0 | 0 | 0 | 2 | 0 | 2 | 0 |
| 4 | DF | Lewis Montsma | 2 | 0 | 1 | 0 | 0 | 0 | 0 | 0 | 3 | 0 |
| 5 | DF | Adam Jackson | 4 | 1 | 0 | 0 | 0 | 0 | 0 | 0 | 4 | 1 |
| 6 | MF | Ethan Erhahon | 7 | 1 | 0 | 0 | 0 | 0 | 3 | 0 | 10 | 1 |
| 7 | FW | Reece Hackett | 3 | 0 | 0 | 0 | 0 | 0 | 0 | 0 | 3 | 0 |
| 8 | MF | Tom Bayliss | 4 | 0 | 0 | 0 | 0 | 0 | 0 | 0 | 4 | 0 |
| 9 | FW | Bailey Cadamarteri | 1 | 0 | 0 | 0 | 0 | 0 | 0 | 0 | 1 | 0 |
| 11 | MF | Ethan Hamilton | 3 | 0 | 0 | 0 | 0 | 0 | 0 | 0 | 3 | 0 |
| 14 | MF | Conor McGrandles | 8 | 0 | 0 | 0 | 0 | 0 | 0 | 0 | 8 | 0 |
| 15 | DF | Paudie O'Connor | 10 | 2 | 0 | 0 | 0 | 0 | 1 | 0 | 11 | 2 |
| 16 | MF | Dom Jefferies | 4 | 0 | 0 | 0 | 0 | 0 | 1 | 0 | 5 | 0 |
| 17 | MF | Dylan Duffy | 1 | 0 | 0 | 0 | 0 | 0 | 0 | 0 | 1 | 0 |
| 18 | FW | Ben House | 12 | 0 | 0 | 0 | 0 | 0 | 1 | 0 | 13 | 0 |
| 22 | DF | Tom Hamer | 1 | 0 | 0 | 0 | 0 | 0 | 0 | 0 | 1 | 0 |
| 23 | DF | Sean Roughan | 3 | 0 | 0 | 0 | 0 | 0 | 0 | 0 | 3 | 0 |
| 24 | MF | Sam Clucas | 1 | 0 | 0 | 0 | 0 | 0 | 0 | 0 | 1 | 0 |
| 25 | FW | James Collins | 2 | 0 | 0 | 0 | 0 | 0 | 0 | 0 | 2 | 0 |
| 26 | MF | Oisin Gallagher | 0 | 0 | 0 | 0 | 0 | 0 | 1 | 0 | 1 | 0 |
| 27 | FW | Jovon Makama | 5 | 0 | 0 | 0 | 0 | 0 | 0 | 0 | 5 | 0 |
| 28 | MF | Jack Moylan | 1 | 0 | 0 | 0 | 1 | 0 | 1 | 0 | 3 | 0 |
| 29 | FW | Rob Street | 0 | 0 | 0 | 0 | 0 | 0 | 1 | 0 | 1 | 0 |
| 31 | GK | Zach Jeacock | 1 | 0 | 0 | 0 | 0 | 0 | 0 | 0 | 1 | 0 |
| 32 | FW | Joe Gardner | 0 | 1 | 0 | 0 | 0 | 0 | 0 | 0 | 0 | 1 |
| 34 | FW | Freddie Draper | 3 | 0 | 0 | 0 | 0 | 0 | 0 | 0 | 3 | 0 |

=== Clean sheets ===
As of 3 May 2025

| No. | Nat. | Player | Matches played | Clean sheet % | League One | FA Cup | EFL Cup | EFL Trophy | Total |
|---|---|---|---|---|---|---|---|---|---|
| 1 | (England) | George Wickens | 39 | 28.21% | 10 | 1 | 0 | 0 | 11 |
| 21 | (England) | Jamie Pardington | 2 | 100% | 0 | 0 | 0 | 2 | 2 |
| 31 | (England) | Zach Jeacock | 15 | 26.67% | 4 | 0 | 0 | 0 | 4 |

== Awards ==
=== Club End of Season Awards ===
| Award | Player | Ref. |
|---|---|---|
| Player of the Year | (Zimbabwe) Tendayi Darikwa | |
| Players Player of the Year | (Zimbabwe) Tendayi Darikwa | |
| Young Player of the Year | (England) Jovon Makama | |
| Golden Boot | (England) Jovon Makama | |
| Goal of the Season | (Saint Lucia) Reeco Hackett | |
| Community Player of the Year | (England) Freddie Draper | |

=== Sky Bet League One Manager of the Month ===
| Month | Manager | | Ref. |
|---|---|---|---|
| August | (England) Michael Skubala | Nomination | |

=== Sky Bet League One Player of the Month ===
| Month | Player | | Ref. |
|---|---|---|---|
| March | (England) Jovon Makama | Winner | |

=== EFL Young Player of the Month ===
| Month | Player | | Ref. |
|---|---|---|---|
| March | (England) Jovon Makama | Winner | |

=== Sky Bet League One Goal of the Month ===
| Month | Player | Goal | | Ref |
|---|---|---|---|---|
| February | (England) Sam Clucas | 83' vs Mansfield Town, 18 February | Nomination | |
| April | (Saint Lucia) Reeco Hackett | 61' vs Bolton Wanderers, 21 April | Nomination | |
