= Okafor =

- Gender: Male
- Language: Igbo

Origin
- Origin: Nigeria
- Region of origin: South East Nigeria

Okafor audiois a Nigerian surname of Igbo origin. Notable people with the surname include:

- Alex Okafor (born 1991), American football player
- Amarachi Okafor (born 1977), Nigerian artist
- Amaka Okafor (born 1981), English actor
- Boniface Okafor (born 1966), Nigerian footballer
- Chris Okafor (born 1970), Nigerian minister
- Don Okafor (died 1966), Nigerian army officer
- Emeka Okafor (born 1982), American basketball player
- Fidelis Uzochukwu Okafor (born 1950), vice-chancellor of Anambra State University
- Happiness Okafor, Nigerian cyclist
- Jahlil Okafor (born 1995), American basketball player
- Joe Okafor (born 1991), American football player
- John Okafor (1961–2024), Nigerian actor
- Jon Okafor (born 1989), American soccer player
- Kelvin Okafor (born 1985), British artist of Nigerian descent
- Ngo Okafor (born 1974), American-born Nigerian actor, boxer and model
- Nnedi Okorafor (born 1974), Nigerian-American writer of science fiction and fantasy
- Noah Okafor (born 2000), Swiss footballer
- Obiora Chinedu Okafor, Canadian lawyer
- Onyekachi Okafor (born 1994), Nigerian footballer
- Queen Okafor (born 1987), Nigerian hirsutism sufferer
- Rosemary Okafor (born 1981), Nigerian sprinter
- Sam Okafor (born 1982), Nigerian footballer
- Simon Akwali Okafor (1934–2014), Roman Catholic bishop
- Uche Okafor (footballer, born 1991), Nigerian footballer
- Uche Okafor (1967–2011), Nigerian footballer
- Ujunwa Okafor (born 1992), Nigerian footballer

== See also ==
- Okafor's Law, 2016 motion picture
