= Chiamaka =

Chiamaka // is a feminine given name of Igbo origin, meaning “chi is beautiful”. Masculine use, though not unheard of, is extremely rare.

== Names ==
Notable bearers include:

- Chiamaka Enyi-Amadi, Nigerian-Irish poet
- Chiamaka Madu (born 1996), Nigerian footballer
- Chiamaka Nnadozie (born 2000), Nigerian footballer
- Chiamaka Obuekwe, Nigerian businessperson
- Chiamaka Okoli (1987–2019), Nigerian astrophysicist
