= Okoli =

Okoli may refer to:

== People ==
- Amelia Okoli (1941–2017), Nigerian track and field athlete
- Chiamaka Okoli (1987–2019), Nigerian astrophysicist
- Emmanuel Okoli (born 1973), Nigerian sprinter
- James Okoli (born 1976), Nigerian football player
- Mobi Okoli (born 1987), Nigerian football player

== Places ==
- Okoli, Croatia, a village near Velika Ludina, Croatia, known for a major natural gas pipeline storage area
