= Adam Jackson =

English footballer

Personal information
- Full name: Adam Lewis Jackson
- Date of birth: 18 May 1994 (age 32)
- Place of birth: Darlington, England
- Height: 6 ft 2 in (1.87 m)
- Position: Centre back

Team information
- Current team: Bromley
- Number: 45

Youth career
- –2011: Middlesbrough

Senior career*
Years	Team	Apps	(Gls)
2011–2016	Middlesbrough	0	(0)
2013	→ FC Halifax Town (loan)	3	(0)
2015	→ Coventry City (loan)	0	(0)
2015–2016	→ Hartlepool United (loan)	29	(3)
2016–2019	Barnsley	38	(1)
2019–2020	Hibernian	14	(3)
2020–2026	Lincoln City	153	(5)
2026–	Bromley	5	(0)

International career
2009–2010	England U16	7	(0)
2010–2011	England U17	13	(2)
2011–2012	England U18	2	(0)
2012	England U19	1	(0)
- * Club domestic league appearances and goals as of 16:55, 31 October 2026 (UTC)

Adam Lewis Jackson (born 18 May 1994) is an English professional footballer who plays as a defender for EFL League One club Bromley.

== Career ==
Jackson began his career with Middlesbrough and joined Coventry City on loan in September 2015. Jackson failed to make an appearance for the Sky Blues and moved on loan to Hartlepool United in November 2015. He made his Football League debut on 15 November 2015 in a 3 1 win over Leyton Orient.

On 30 August 2016, Jackson signed a three-year contract with Championship club Barnsley. His first goal for the club came in an EFL Cup tie against Derby County on 12 September 2017.

He was released by Barnsley at the end of the 2018/19 season.

On 30 May 2019, Jackson signed a two-year deal with Hibernian.

On 11 August 2020, Jackson signed for Lincoln City. He would make his Lincoln debut, starting in the 1 1 draw against Scunthorpe United in the EFL Trophy. He scored his first goal for the club 4 days later on the opening day of the League One season against Oxford United. He would receive a red card in his fifth league game at home to Bristol Rovers. He signed a new contract taking him until the end of the 2024–25 season on 7 May 2023. Following the end of the 2024–25 season an option was taken up in his contract. In July 2025, he signed a new contract until the summer of June 2027, with an opportunity to trigger a further year based on appearances. On 3 September 2026, Lincoln City confirmed that Jackson had left the club by mutual consent after 179 games and 5 goals across 6 seasons.

On 21 September 2026, Bromley announced Jackson had signed for the club.

== Career statistics ==
As of 31 October 2026

Appearances and goals by club, season and competition
Club	Season	League			National cup (Note: Includes FA Cup, Scottish Cup)		League cup (Note: Includes EFL Cup, Scottish League Cup)		Other		Total	
Club	Season	Division	Apps	Goals	Apps	Goals	Apps	Goals	Apps	Goals	Apps	Goals
Middlesbrough	2012–13	Championship	0	0	0	0	0	0	—		0	0
Middlesbrough	2013–14	Championship	0	0	0	0	0	0	—		0	0
Middlesbrough	2014–15	Championship	0	0	0	0	0	0	—		0	0
Middlesbrough	2015–16	Championship	0	0	0	0	0	0	—		0	0
Middlesbrough	Total		0	0	0	0	0	0	0	0	0	0
FC Halifax Town (loan)	2012–13	Conference North	3	0	0	0	—		0	0	3	0
Coventry City (loan)	2015–16	League One	0	0	0	0	0	0	0	0	0	0
Hartlepool United (loan)	2015–16	League Two	29	3	4	0	0	0	0	0	33	3
Barnsley	2016–17	Championship	10	0	1	0	0	0	—		11	0
Barnsley	2017–18	Championship	22	1	0	0	1	1	—		23	2
Barnsley	2018–19	League One	6	0	0	0	1	0	3	0	10	0
Barnsley	Total		38	1	1	0	2	0	3	0	44	1
Hibernian	2019–20	Scottish Premiership	14	3	2	1	6	0	—		22	4
Hibernian	Total		14	3	2	1	6	0	0	0	22	4
Lincoln City	2020–21	League One	28	1	1	0	1	0	4 (Note: Appearance(s) in League One Play-offs & Football League Trophy)	0	34	1
Lincoln City	2021–22	League One	25	0	1	0	0	0	0	0	26	0
Lincoln City	2022–23	League One	29	1	1	0	3	0	3 (Note: Appearance(s) in Football League Trophy)	0	36	1
Lincoln City	2023–24	League One	34	1	1	0	1	0	1	0	37	1
Lincoln City	2024–25	League One	27	2	1	0	1	0	2	0	31	2
Lincoln City	2025–26	League One	10	0	1	0	1	0	2	0	14	0
Lincoln City	2026–27	Championship	0	0	0	0	1	0	—		1	0
Lincoln City	Total		153	5	6	0	8	0	12	0	179	5
Bromley	2026–27	League One	5	0	0	0	—		2	0	7	0
Career total			242	12	13	1	16	0	17	0	288	13

== Honours ==
Lincoln City

- EFL League One: 2025–26
