= Okonkwo =

Nigerian surname

- Gender: Male
- Language: Igbo

Origin
- Meaning: A boy born on Nkwo day
- Region of origin: Igboland

Other names
- Variant form: Okoronkwo

Okonkwo audio is a Nigerian surname. It is a male name and of Igbo origin, which means "A boy born on Nkwo day". Nkwo day is "the last of the four Igbo market days". The diminutive form is Okoronkwo.

Notable people with the name include:

- Albert Okonkwo, Nigerian general
- Amy Okonkwo (born 1996), Nigerian basketball player
- Annie Okonkwo (born 1960), Nigerian politician
- Arthur Okonkwo (born 2001), English football player
- Charles Okonkwo (born 1965), Nigerian footballer
- Chibuzor Okonkwo (born 1988), Nigerian footballer
- Chig Okonkwo (born 1999), American football player
- Chiké Okonkwo (born 1982), British actor
- Christian Okonkwo, Nigerian footballer
- Christopher Okonkwo (born 1941), Nigerian athlete
- Daniel Okonkwo (born 1975), English basketball player
- Digger Okonkwo (born 1975), Nigerian Maltese footballer
- Ernest Okonkwo (1936-1990), Nigerian sport commentator and journalist
- Joe Okonkwo, American writer
- Kennedy Okonkwo (born 1977), Nigerian businessman
- Kenneth Okonkwo (born 1968), Nigerian actor
- Nnamdi Okonkwo, Nigerian banker
- Og Okonkwo, Nigerian fashion designer
- Onyekachi Okonkwo (born 1982), Nigerian footballer
- Patrick Okonkwo (born 1998), Nigerian soccer player
- Rachael Okonkwo (born 1987), Nigerian actress

Fictional characters

- Okonkwo, the protagonist of Things Fall Apart, a novel by Chinua Achebe
- Idie Okonkwo, Marvel Comics character
