= Queen Okafor =

Nigerian-born, 29-year-old lady (born 1987)

- Born: Queen Nonyerem Okafor; 2 July 1987 (age 38)
- Other names: Nonye Okafor
- Occupation: Nurse
- Spouse: in a relationship

Queen Nonyerem Okafor is a Nigerian-born woman who is said to be Nigeria's hairiest woman.

A native of Nneobi-Nnewi, Anambra State in South eastern Nigeria, Queen spent her early years schooling in Owerri. She is second child in a family of five children.

At first born hairless, she started sprouting hair in prodigious quantity at age 21. She currently resides in Lagos, Nigeria where she is trying to get into the Nigeria's movie industry (popularly called Nollywood).

Queen is constantly trimming her hair. Thus no measurement has been taken to establish the real length of her hair.
