= Vivian Okeke =

Nigerian former diplomat

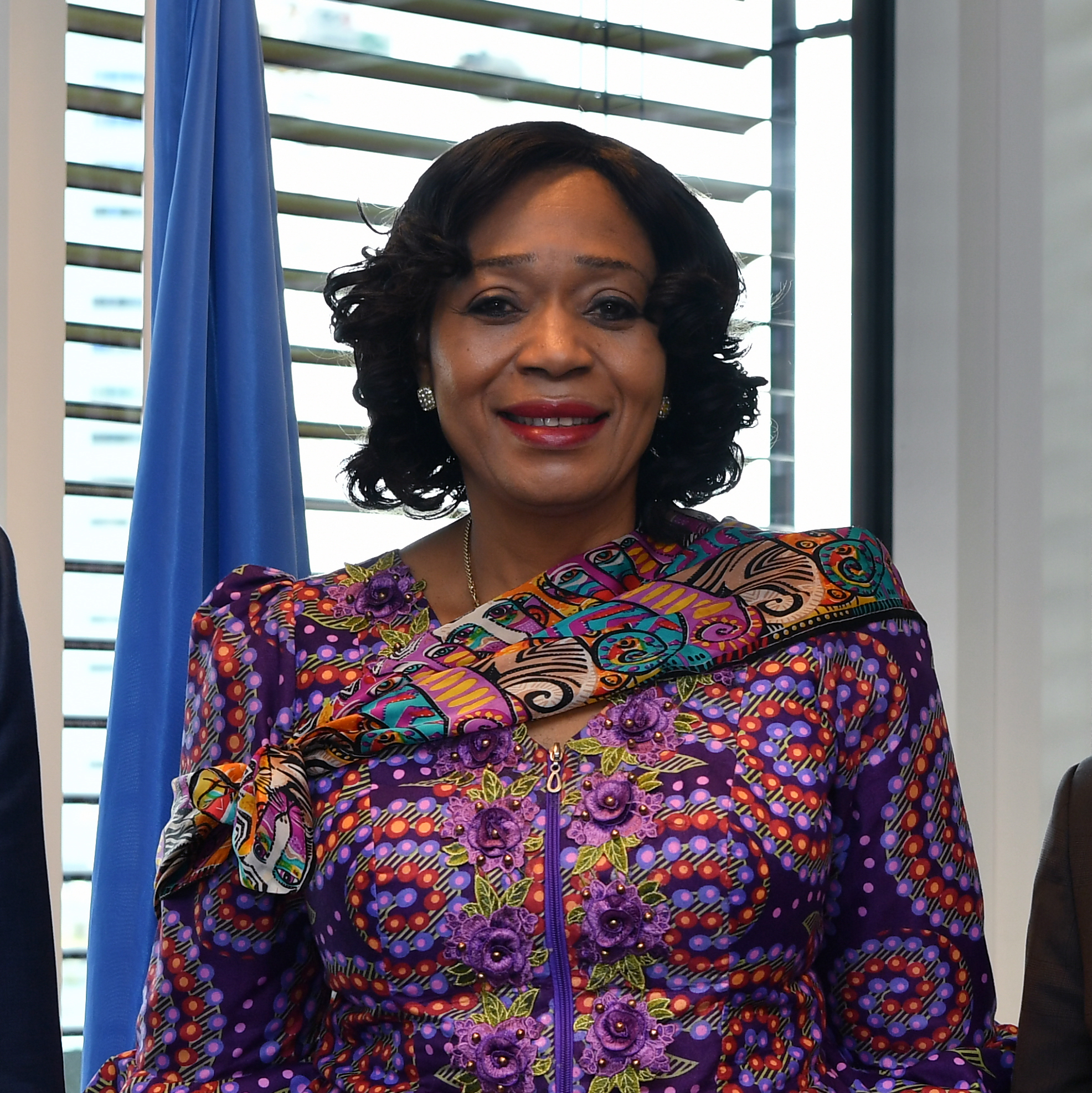
- Education: Ahmadu Bello University and the University of Lagos
- Occupation: Ambassador
- Known for: Nigerian Ambassador to Austria and Slovakia
- Children: 4

Vivian N. R. Okeke is a Nigerian former diplomat. She was Ambassador to Austria, Slovakia, and international bodies based in Vienna (e.g. International Atomic Energy Agency (IAEA)).

== Life ==
Her family comes from Awka Anambra State. She took international relations obtaining a graduate degree at Ahmadu Bello University in Zaria before moving to Lagos to obtain a master's degree at The University Of Lagos.

H.E. Mrs. Vivian Okeke was the Ambassador of the Federal Republic of Nigeria to the Republic of Austria, the Republic of Slovakia and Permanent Representative to the International Organizations in Vienna.

She attended the Ahmadu Bello University in Zaria and the University of Lagos where she gained a Bachelor's and Master's degrees in International Studies and Political Science.

Okeke served as Deputy Director in charge of First Committee at the First United Nations Division of the Ministry of Foreign Affairs Abuja, where she championed the responsibilities of Nuclear Disarmament, Chemical Weapons Convention, Biological Weapons Convention and other Weapons of Mass Destruction. Mrs. Vivian Okeke has also served as Political Affairs Officer at the Nigerian Embassy in Brussels, Belgium, Head of Chancery at the Consulate General of Nigeria New York as well as Minister in charge of Trade and Investment at the Embassy of Nigeria in Washington DC.

She has been a member of the Nigerian Delegation to the United Nations Conference on the Status of Women and United Nations General Assembly (UNGA) in Beijing and New York respectively as well as annual General Conferences of the International Atomic Energy Agency (IAEA) and regular sessions of the Commission on Narcotic Drugs in Vienna since 2017.

She was working at the Ministry of Foreign Affairs in Abuja leading the America and Caribbean Affairs Division when she was appointed to be a Nigerian ambassador. During her vetting she could not recite the country's anthem and she was still appointed. She became her country's Ambassador to Austria, the Republic of Slovakia, and international bodies based in Vienna. She presented her credentials to Austria's President, Dr Alexander Van der Bellen, in October 2017.

Abel Adelakun Ayoko had been the ambassador from 2013.

She has met with Vienna based IAEA where she has restated Nigeria's intention to use nuclear power to generate electricity and she has progressed the necessary oversights.

Okeke paid her farewell visit to the United Nations Industrial Development Organization (UNIDO) which is based in Vienna in January 2020. On 27 January there was a reception to mark the end of her ambassadorial residency in Vienna where she was given a certificate of thanks.

== Private life ==
Okeke is married to Chief Simon Nsobundu Okeke (Ochendo) and they have four children.
