= Nwamaka =

- Gender: Female
- Language: Igbo

Origin
- Origin: Igbo
- Meaning: The child is beautiful or beautiful child
- Region of origin: Igboland

Nwamaka is a feminine given name of Igbo origin, meaning "the child is beautiful" or "beautiful child".

== Notable people with this name ==
- Nwamaka Okoye (born July 7, 1985), Nigerian interior architect, author, and social entrepreneur
