= Freddie Draper =

English footballer (born 2004)

Personal information
- Full name: Frederick Charles Draper
- Date of birth: 28 July 2004 (age 22)
- Place of birth: Oxfordshire, England
- Height: 5 ft 11 in (1.81 m)
- Position: Forward

Team information
- Current team: Lincoln City
- Number: 34

Youth career
- 2011–2015: Coventry City
- 2015–2020: Derby County
- 2020–2021: Lincoln City

Senior career*
Years	Team	Apps	(Gls)
2021–	Lincoln City	107	(15)
2022	→ Gainsborough Trinity (loan)	8	(1)
2023	→ Drogheda United (loan)	21	(8)
2023–2024	→ Walsall (loan)	22	(10)
- * Club domestic league appearances and goals as of 09:15, 8 November 2026 (UTC)

Frederick Charles Draper (born 28 July 2004) is an English professional footballer who plays as a forward for EFL Championship club Lincoln City.

== Club career ==
=== Lincoln City ===
Freddie Draper joined the Imps as a first-year scholar from Derby County. He signed his first professional contract on his 17th birthday, signing a three-year deal. He would make his Lincoln City debut against Sheffield Wednesday on 23 October 2021 coming off the bench to replace Anthony Scully. On 11 February 2022, he would join Gainsborough Trinity on loan until the end of the season. On 14 April 2022, he received his nomination for LFE Apprentice of the Season at the 2022 EFL Awards, joined by Deji Elerewe and Michael Williams Following the end 2021–22 season, Draper would be named Lincoln City's Academy Player of the season at the end of season awards.

The following season, Draper signed a new long-term contract at the club. The following month he would score his first professional goal after coming off the bench against Newscastle United U21 in the EFL Trophy.

==== Drogheda United (loan) ====
On 31 January 2023, he joined Drogheda United on loan for the season along with teammate Elicha Ahui. He scored his first goal for the club in a 3–1 loss away to Bohemians on 6 March. On 16 March, he had his penalty saved in the Louth Derby against Dundalk which would have earned Drogheda a point, but he scored the equaliser in the reverse fixture on 28 April, which 10-man Drogheda went on to narrowly lose 3–2 in injury time.

Draper was nominated for the League of Ireland Player of the Month award in May, scoring 4 goals throughout the month. These included his first home goal against Shelbourne, a brace in a 3–1 win over UCD, and the first goal in a shock win away to league champions Shamrock Rovers. He continued his run of form into June, scoring his 7th and 8th goals of the season; 2 headers, as Drogheda fell to a 3–2 away defeat against Shelbourne. On 22 June 2023, Draper was named League of Ireland Player of the Month for the month of May 2023, becoming the first Drogheda United player to win the accolade since 2014, and the first teenager to claim the award since 1999. His last appearance for the club saw him shown a straight red card in a 2–1 home loss to Dundalk.

On 26 June, It was confirmed that both Draper and Ahui would return to Lincoln City following the completion of their loan on 30 June.

==== Walsall (loan) ====
On 7 July 2023, on signing a new long-term contract at Lincoln City, he joined Walsall on a season-long loan. He made his debut on 12 August 2023, following the conclusion of his suspension for Drogheda United, starting the game and getting an assist against Stockport County. His first Walsall goal came in the first minute against Crewe Alexandra on 19 August 2023. He scored his first career hat-trick against Newport County, scoring the third goal in the 96th minute to secure a 3–3 draw. On 5 January 2024, Draper was recalled by Lincoln City having scored 10 goals and 3 assists in 23 matches.

=== Return to Lincoln City ===
He scored his first Lincoln City league goal against Reading on 6 April 2024 following the return from his loan spell at Walsall. He signed a new contract until the summer of 2028 in February 2025. At the end of the season, he received the clubs Community Player of the Year.

Ahead of the 2026–27 season, he extended his contract until 2030.

== Career statistics ==
As of 7 November 2026

Appearances and goals by club, season and competition
Club	Season	League			National Cup		League Cup		Other		Total	
Club	Season	Division	Apps	Goals	Apps	Goals	Apps	Goals	Apps	Goals	Apps	Goals
Lincoln City	2021–22	League One	8	0	1	0	0	0	0	0	9	0
Lincoln City	2022–23	League One	0	0	1	0	1	0	1 (Note: Appearance(s) in Football League Trophy)	1	3	1
Lincoln City	2023–24	League One	16	2	0	0	0	0	0	0	16	2
Lincoln City	2024–25	League One	37	4	3	0	1	0	5	1	46	5
Lincoln City	2025–26	League One	32	7	1	0	3	1	3	0	39	8
Lincoln City	2026–27	Championship	14	2	0	0	2	0	–		16	2
Lincoln City	Total		107	15	6	0	7	1	9	2	129	18
Gainsborough Trinity (loan)	2021–22	Northern Premier League	8	1	0	0	–		0	0	8	1
Drogheda United (loan)	2023	LOI Premier Division	21	8	–		–		1 (Note: Appearance(s) in Leinster Senior Cup)	0	22	8
Walsall (loan)	2023–24	League Two	22	10	2	0	0	0	1	0	25	10
Career total			157	35	8	0	7	1	11	2	183	38

== Honours ==
Lincoln City

- EFL League One: 2025–26

Individual

- League of Ireland Premier Division Player of the Month: May 2023
