= Joe Gardner (footballer) =

Footballer (born 2005)

Personal information
- Full name: Joseph Charles Gardner
- Date of birth: 6 June 2005 (age 21)
- Place of birth: Nottingham, England
- Height: 1.81 m (5 ft 11 in)
- Positions: Forward; winger; attacking midfielder

Team information
- Current team: Falkirk
- Number: 18

Youth career
- 2016–2024: Nottingham Forest

Senior career*
Years	Team	Apps	(Gls)
2024–2026	Nottingham Forest	0	(0)
2025	→ Lincoln City (loan)	11	(1)
2025–2026	→ Mansfield Town (loan)	14	(1)
2026–	Falkirk	2	(0)

International career^{‡}
2025	Republic of Ireland U21	3	(0)
- * Club domestic league appearances and goals as of 14:30, 1 October 2026 (UTC) ‡ National team caps and goals as of 11:00, 24 October 2026 (UTC)

Joseph Charles Gardner (born 6 June 2005) is a professional footballer who plays as a forward for club Falkirk. Born in England, he has represented Ireland at a youth level.

== Club career ==
While part of the Nottingham Forest youth academy, which he joined in 2016, he featured for the club's U21 side in the EFL Trophy in the 2023–24 and 2024–25 seasons, and scored against Carlisle United in a 2–1 victory in September 2024.

He made his first-team debut for Nottingham Forest against Bristol City in the FA Cup on 7 February 2024. He later featured on the bench for Premier League matches without making his debut. He scored six goals in Premier League 2 for Forest in the first half of the 2024–25 season.

On 31 January 2025, he signed a new contract with Nottingham Forest and joined EFL League One side Lincoln City on a six-month loan. Gardner made his debut coming off the bench against Cambridge United on 8 February 2025, where he received a straight red card 4 minutes into his debut. He scored his first league goal for Lincoln against Crawley Town on 4 March 2025, scoring the fourth goal to round off a 4–1 win.

Gardner joined divisional rivals Mansfield Town on 14 July 2025. He was one of three Nottingham Forest youth players to sign for Mansfield, alongside Kyle McAdam and Jamie McDonnell. He made his debut in the league game against Wycombe on 6 September 2025. He scored his first goal in a 1–1 league draw against Stevenage on 13 September 2025.

On 28 July 2026, Gardner signed with Scottish Premiership side Falkirk on a three-year deal for an undisclosed fee.

== International career ==
In January 2023, he was called up by the Republic of Ireland national under-19 football team for a UK-based training camp ahead of their UEFA European U19 Championship qualifiers the following month. On 13 March 2025, Gardner received his first Republic of Ireland U21 call up for their friendlies against Scotland U21 & Hungary U21 in Spain. He made his debut for the side against Scotland U21 on 21 March, missing an 88th minute penalty in a 2–0 loss.

== Career statistics ==
As of 2 May 2026

Appearances and goals by club, season and competition
Club	Season	League			FA Cup		League Cup		Other		Total	
Club	Season	Division	Apps	Goals	Apps	Goals	Apps	Goals	Apps	Goals	Apps	Goals
Nottingham Forest U21	2023–24	—			—		—		3 (Note: Appearance(s) in the EFL Trophy)	0	3	0
Nottingham Forest U21	2024–25	—			—		—		3	1	3	1
Nottingham Forest U21	Total		—		—		—		6	1	6	1
Nottingham Forest	2023–24	Premier League	0	0	1	0	0	0	—		1	0
Nottingham Forest	2024–25	Premier League	0	0	0	0	0	0	—		0	0
Nottingham Forest	2025–26	Premier League	0	0	0	0	0	0	—		0	0
Nottingham Forest	Total		0	0	1	0	0	0	0	0	1	0
Lincoln City (loan)	2024–25	League One	11	1	–		–		–		11	1
Mansfield Town (loan)	2025–26	League One	14	1	1	0	–		2	0	17	1
Career total			25	2	2	0	0	0	8	1	35	3
