= Simon Okeke =

Nigerian politician (1936)

Simon Nsobundu Okeke (born 7 January 1936 in Amichi) is a Nigerian politician and former chairman of the Police Service Commission (PSC) from Nnewi, Anambra state. He is one of the forebears of the 1999 democratic government in Nigeria that transitioned from Military rule. In 2023, he advocated and encouraged political parties to nominate a presidential candidate of Igbo extraction for the purpose of inclusion. He was awarded ECOWAS Award for leadership role in Business and Profession.

== Background and education ==
He got his First School Leaving Certificate in 1950 at Amichi, and later attended the Dennis Memorial Grammar School, Onitsha in 1951–1955, before moving to St Marks’ Teachers Training College 1956–1957 followed by a short teaching career, and later proceeded with a Federal Scholarship to the University of London in 1961 where he graduated and became one of the early Nigerian Graduates in Estate Management and Land Economy. He is married to Ambassador Vivian Okeke who was a former Nigerian diplomat and Ambassador to Austria, Slovakia and permanent representative to the United Nations, and they have nine children. He authored books including, "Policing the Nigeria Police," "My Root," "Just as I am." He is also the founder of Knight Frank real estate.

== Career ==
He graduated from the Teachers Training College in 1957, then began his early career as a class teacher at Union Secondary School, Awkunanaw, Enugu. Upon his graduation from the University of London in 1961, he joins the real estate business, and later joined the Nigerian public service. On November 28, 2001, to November 27, 2006, he was appointed the executive chairman of Police Service Commission by the then Nigerian president Olusegun Obasanjo. He was placed in charge of the commission which is the general recruiter and managing body of the Nigeria Police officers with the responsibilities of recruiting and exercise disciplinary measures over all personnels in the Nigeria Police Force with the exception of the Inspector- General of Police who is appointed by the presidency.
