= Okoronkwo =

- Gender: Male
- Language: Igbo

Origin
- Origin: Nigerian
- Meaning: A boy born on Nkwo day.
- Region of origin: South East, Nigeria

Other names
- Variant form: Okonkwo

Okoronkwo // is a Nigerian surname. It is a male name and of Igbo origin, which means "A boy born on Nkwo day.".Nkwo day is "the last of the four Igbo market days". The diminutive form is Okonkwo.

== Notable individuals with the name ==
- Esther Okoronkwo (born 1997), Nigerian professional footballer.
- Isaac Okoronkwo (born 1978), Nigerian former professional football player.
- Ikechukwu Francis Okoronkwo (born 1970), Nigerian visual artist, painter, sculptor and author.
- Ivy Uche Okoronkwo (born 1978), Nigerian former Deputy Inspector General of Police (DIG) in the Nigerian Police.
- Jonathan Okoronkwo (born 2003), Nigerian professional football player.
- Ogbonnia Okoronkwo (born 1995), Nigerian American football defensive end player.
- Solomon Okoronkwo (born 1987), Nigerian professional football player.
