= Bailey Cadamarteri =

Footballer (born 2005)

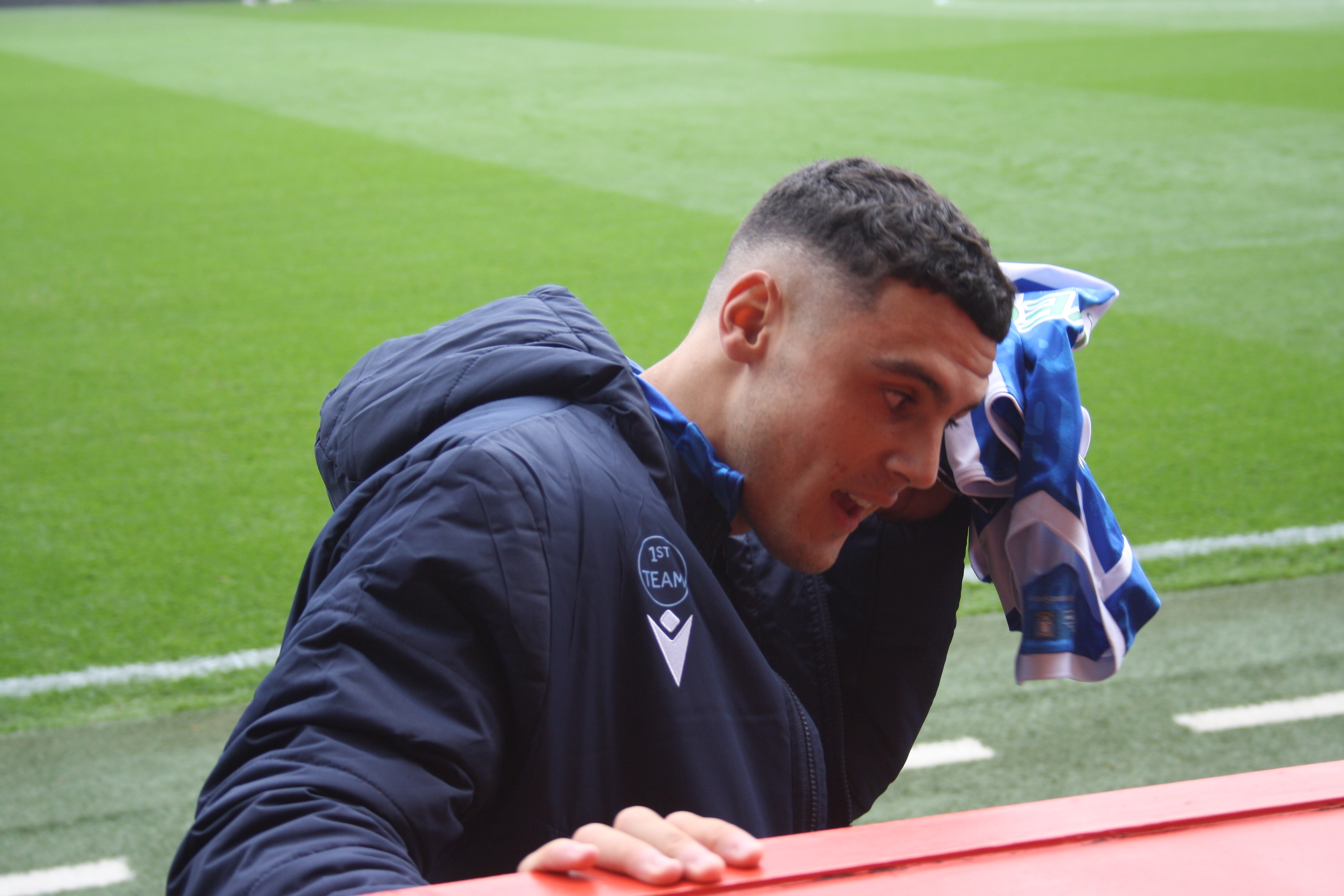
- Cadamarteri in 2025

Personal information
- Full name: Bailey-Tye Cadamarteri
- Date of birth: 9 May 2005 (age 21)
- Place of birth: Leeds, England
- Position: Striker

Team information
- Current team: Wrexham
- Number: 11

Youth career
- 2014–2022: Sheffield Wednesday

Senior career*
Years	Team	Apps	(Gls)
2022–2026	Sheffield Wednesday	52	(6)
2024–2025	→ Lincoln City (loan)	23	(5)
2026–	Wrexham	9	(0)

International career^{‡}
2024	England U19	2	(1)
2024	England U20	2	(0)
2025–	Jamaica	11	(2)
- * Club domestic league appearances and goals as of 09:17, 22 November 2026 (UTC) ‡ National team caps and goals as of 23:13, 2 October 2026 (UTC)

Bailey-Tye Cadamarteri (born 9 May 2005) is a professional footballer who plays as a striker for EFL Championship club Wrexham. Born in England, he plays for the Jamaica national team.

== Club career ==
=== Sheffield Wednesday ===
Cadamarteri joined the Sheffield Wednesday youth team at the age of 8. In October 2021 he scored 4 goals to help the club's under-18 team to a 6–5 win, having come back from losing 5–1. In January 2022 he was linked with a transfer to a Premier League club, and later that month he spoke about the challenge the youth team was facing in the FA Youth Cup. In February 2022 he was again linked with a transfer away to the Premier League.

Cadamarteri signed his first professional contract on 8 June 2022. He made his senior debut in the EFL Trophy against Leicester City U21 on 18 October 2022. He then returned to the under-18 team, and the under-21 team, although continued to be involved around the first-team, but manager Darren Moore said he was not ready for first-team football yet. The club also rejected loan offers for him.

He suffered an injury later that season, undergoing surgery, and being ruled out for the rest of the campaign. He missed part of the 2023–24 pre-season whilst recovering from the injury. He started the season playing with the under-21s, with the club later saying that they would not rush him into the first-team.

He made his league debut on 11 November 2023, appearing as a half-time substitute in a 4–0 defeat, and was praised by manager Danny Röhl. His first senior goal came against Blackburn Rovers helping his side win 3–1. After impressing Röhl, he signed a new four-and-a-half-year contract at the club on 11 December 2023. After starting every game, scoring three goals and getting one assist for the month of December, Cadamarteri won the EFL Young Player of the Month award.

On 28 August 2024, it was announced that Cadamarteri had signed a season-long loan with League One side Lincoln City. He made his debut on 31 August 2024, coming off the bench in a 1–0 win against Stevenage. His first goal came against Cambridge United scoring the second in a 2–0 win. He was ruled out for the remainder of his loan in March with a groin injury, having already struggled for game time in the second half of the season due to the same injury. He played a total of 31 times scoring 8 goals across all competitions during his season-long loan spell.

After returning from his loan spell with Lincoln, Cadamarteri returned to the Sheffield Wednesday lineup on the opening day of the 2025–26 season, playing in a 2–1 defeat to recently relegated Leicester City. His first goal on after his return was the equaliser away to Wrexham in a 2–2 draw.

=== Wrexham ===
On 2 February 2026, Cadamarteri joined Championship side Wrexham for an undisclosed fee, signing a contract until 2029.

== International career ==
On 14 March 2024, he was selected for the Jamaica national team, before also being called up by the England under-19 national team the next day. He made his England U19 debut coming off the bench for Will Lankshear against Morocco under-19 on 21 March 2024. On 24 May 2024, Cadamarteri was called up to the England Men's Elite League squad.

Cadamarteri was once again called up to the Jamaica national team in August 2025. On 5 September 2025 he made his full international debut, starting in the 4–0 win against Bermuda. The following game against Trinidad and Tobago Cadamarteri scored his first international goal. In March 2026, Cadamarteri scored the only goal in Jamaica's victory against New Caledonia in the 2026 FIFA World Cup qualification (inter-confederation play-offs), sending his country into the final.

== Personal life ==
Born in Leeds, he is of Italian, Irish and Jamaican descent. He is the son of former footballer Danny Cadamarteri. His younger brother Caelan-Kole is also a footballer.

== Career statistics ==
As of match played 21 November 2026

Appearances and goals by club, season and competition
Club	Season	League			FA Cup		EFL Cup		Other		Total	
Club	Season	Division	Apps	Goals	Apps	Goals	Apps	Goals	Apps	Goals	Apps	Goals
Sheffield Wednesday	2022–23	League One	0	0	0	0	0	0	1 (Note: Appearance(s) in the EFL Trophy)	0	1	0
Sheffield Wednesday	2023–24	Championship	23	4	2	1	0	0	—		25	5
Sheffield Wednesday	2024–25	Championship	0	0	0	0	1	0	—		1	0
Sheffield Wednesday	2025–26	Championship	29	2	1	0	0	0	—		30	2
Sheffield Wednesday	Total		52	6	3	1	1	0	1	0	57	7
Lincoln City (loan)	2024–25	League One	23	5	3	0	—		5	3	31	8
Wrexham	2025–26	Championship	3	0	—		—		0	0	3	0
Wrexham	2026–27	Championship	6	0	0	0	1	0	0	0	7	0
Wrexham	Total		9	0	0	0	1	0	0	0	10	0
Career total			84	11	6	1	2	0	6	3	98	15

=== International ===
As of 2 October 2026

Appearances and goals by national team and year
National team	Year	Apps	Goals
Jamaica	2025	4	1
Jamaica	2026	7	1
Total		11	2

Scores and results list Jamaica's goal tally first, score column indicates score after each Cadamarteri goal.

List of international goals scored by Bailey Cadamarteri
No.	Date	Venue	Opponent	Score	Result	Competition
1	9 September 2025	Independence Park, Kingston, Jamaica	Trinidad and Tobago	1–0	2–0	2026 FIFA World Cup qualification
2	26 March 2026	Estadio Akron, Zapopan, Mexico	New Caledonia	1–0	1–0	2026 FIFA World Cup qualification

== Honours ==
Individual

- EFL Young Player of the Month: December 2023
