= Zach Jeacock =

English footballer (born 2001)

Personal information
- Full name: Zachary Anton John Jeacock
- Date of birth: 8 May 2001 (age 25)
- Place of birth: Birmingham, England
- Height: 1.91 m (6 ft 3 in)
- Position: Goalkeeper

Team information
- Current team: Northampton Town (on loan from Lincoln City)
- Number: 1

Youth career
- 2006–2009: West Hagley
- 2009–2018: Birmingham City

Senior career*
Years	Team	Apps	(Gls)
2018–2024	Birmingham City	4	(0)
2018	→ Stourport Swifts (loan)	2	(0)
2019–2020	→ Gloucester City (loan)	13	(0)
2021–2022	→ Salford City (loan)	1	(0)
2023–2024	→ Gloucester City (loan)	28	(0)
2024–	Lincoln City	11	(0)
2024–2025	→ Southend United (loan)	3	(0)
2026–	→ Northampton Town (loan)	14	(0)

International career
2019	England U19	3	(0)
- * Club domestic league appearances and goals as of 17:09, 21 November 2026 (UTC)

Zachary Anton John Jeacock (born 8 May 2001) is an English professional footballer who plays as a goalkeeper for EFL League Two club Northampton Town on loan from EFL Championship club Lincoln City.

He began his career with Birmingham City, and made his Football League debut for the club in the EFL Championship in 2020. He also spent time on loan at Stourport Swifts of the Midland League Premier Division, National League North club Gloucester City (two spells), and Salford City of League Two. He left Birmingham by mutual consent in January 2024. In international football, he has represented England at under-19 level.

== Early life and career ==
Jeacock was born in Birmingham and lived in Chaddesley Corbett, Worcestershire, where he attended Winterfold House preparatory school before moving on to nearby Bromsgrove School. He played football as an attacking midfielder or striker for West Hagley F.C. before, a few days after his eighth birthday in May 2009, becoming the then youngest boy to sign for Birmingham City. He went on to compete for Birchfield Harriers as a sprinter, and played football as a defender, only converting to goalkeeper at the age of 14.

Jeacock took up a two-year scholarship with Birmingham City's Academy in July 2017. He went on to make ten appearances for Birmingham's development squad team in the 2018–19 season as they finished as runners-up in the Professional Development League northern section and lost out to Leeds United on penalties for the overall title. He was offered a three-year deal in March 2019, and signed it in May. His apprenticeship went well off the field as well: he achieved top grades in his BTEC course, was selected in League Football Education's Team of the Year, and was described by Birmingham City's Head of Education and Welfare, Mark Sinclair, as "an excellent ambassador for the football club, and somebody who has embraced all aspects of his apprenticeship, with him maximising his opportunities to continually develop himself and others."

== Senior career ==
=== Birmingham City ===
==== 2019–2021 ====
In August 2019, Birmingham City loaned Jeacock to National League North club Gloucester City for the season. He went straight into the starting eleven and in his fourth appearance, after his team came back from 2–0 down to lead 3–2 at Kidderminster Harriers, he saved a late penalty and was named man of the match. He started in 10 of the first 12 matches of the league season – he was away on international duty for the other two – but then a broken hand kept him out until January 2020. After a couple of games for Birmingham U23s, he rejoined Gloucester City and made three more appearances in January before he was recalled by Birmingham to "explore other loan opportunities". No such opportunities occurred before the season was abandoned because of the COVID-19 pandemic.

He played in the first team's pre-season friendlies in August 2020 before the arrival of Andrés Prieto, who started the first competitive fixture of the season, in the 2020–21 EFL Cup at home to Cambridge United, with Jeacock on the bench. He was selected ahead of the injured Prieto and the newly arrived Neil Etheridge to start the opening match of the Championship season, at home to Brentford on 12 September. He kept a clean sheet as Birmingham won the match 1–0, after which Etheridge became first choice and Prieto second. Jeacock injured an ankle playing for Birmingham U23s, required surgery, and was out for much of the season. He made another four appearances for the U23s as they went on to win the Professional Development League title, but did not himself play in the final. He started the penultimate Championship match of the season, a 4–0 defeat at home to Cardiff City, in which new manager Lee Bowyer fielded a number of fringe players after relegation had been avoided. In July 2021, his contract was extended to run until 2024.

==== 2021–2024 ====
After Birmingham signed Matija Sarkic on loan to cover Etheridge's recovery from COVID-19, Jeacock was allowed to leave on a season-long loan at League Two club Salford City, whose previous first-choice goalkeeper, Václav Hladký, had left the club. Jeacock began the season as backup to Tom King, and made his debut on 31 August in an EFL Trophy match against Oldham Athletic. He conceded once, to a Carl Piergianni header, and his side lost 1–0. With King away on international duty, Jeacock made his first league appearance four days later in a 2–1 defeat away to Carlisle United. Over the next four months, his only appearances were in the EFL Trophy, and on 11 January 2022, after Sarkic suffered a season-ending injury, Jeacock was recalled by Birmingham.

Jeacock made no appearances in the 2022–23 season, and was on the bench for Birmingham's EFL Cup first-round match in August 2023. He rejoined Gloucester City of the National League North on 15 August on loan until 31 January 2024. He was Gloucester's regular goalkeeper throughout his spell, making 31 appearances in all competitions.

When his loan expired, he returned to Birmingham, and was released by mutual consent on 1 February, with five months of his contract still to run.

=== Lincoln City ===
On 3 July 2024, Jeacock joined Lincoln City on a two-year deal plus a one-year club option. He made his debut in the 2–1 defeat in the EFL Cup to Harrogate Town on 13 August 2024. On 18 October, he was loaned to National League club Southend United until January 2025. The following season, he was nominated for the EFL Trophy player of the round for the group stages. The same day he signed a new contract until at least 2029, with an option for a further year.

On 11 June 2026, he joined League Two club Northampton Town on a season-long loan. He made his debut against Leicester City in the EFL Cup in a 0–1 defeat.

== International career ==
Jeacock's first inclusion in an England squad came at under-19 level, for friendly matches in September 2019 in preparation for the Euro qualifiers later that year. He made his debut in the starting eleven for a 3–1 win against Greece on 5 September, and remained an unused substitute for the 1–0 defeat to Germany four days later. He was again part of the squad for friendlies against France and Belgium in October, and started in the second game, a 4–2 win in which he was dispossessed in his area for Belgium's first goal. A broken hand prevented him being considered for the qualifiers in November.

== Career statistics ==
As of 21 November 2026

Appearances and goals by club, season and competition
Club	Season	League			FA Cup		EFL Cup		Other		Total	
Club	Season	Division	Apps	Goals	Apps	Goals	Apps	Goals	Apps	Goals	Apps	Goals
Birmingham City	2018–19	Championship	0	0	0	0	0	0	—		0	0
Birmingham City	2019–20	Championship	0	0	0	0	0	0	—		0	0
Birmingham City	2020–21	Championship	2	0	0	0	0	0	—		2	0
Birmingham City	2021–22	Championship	2	0	0	0	0	0	—		2	0
Birmingham City	2022–23	Championship	0	0	0	0	0	0	—		0	0
Birmingham City	2023–24	Championship	0	0	0	0	0	0	—		0	0
Birmingham City	Total		4	0	0	0	0	0	—		4	0
Stourport Swifts (loan)	2018–19	Midland League Premier Division	2	0	1	0	—		—		3	0
Gloucester City (loan)	2019–20	National League North	13	0	0	0	—		0	0	13	0
Salford City (loan)	2021–22	League Two	1	0	0	0	0	0	3 (Note: Appearances in EFL Trophy)	0	4	0
Gloucester City (loan)	2023–24	National League North	28	0	1	0	—		2 (Note: Appearances in FA Trophy)	0	31	0
Lincoln City	2024–25	League One	11	0	1	0	1	0	2	0	15	0
Lincoln City	2025–26	League One	0	0	0	0	3	0	4	0	7	0
Lincoln City	2026–27	Championship	0	0	0	0	0	0	0	0	0	0
Lincoln City	Total		11	0	1	0	4	0	6	0	22	0
Southend United (loan)	2024–25	National League	3	0	0	0	—		1	0	4	0
Northampton Town (loan)	2026–27	League Two	14	0	1	0	1	0	1	0	17	0
Career total			76	0	4	0	5	0	13	0	98	0
