= Chiamaka Okoli =

Nigerian astrophysicist (1987–2019)

Chiamaka Okoli (1987–2019) was a Nigerian astrophysicist whose research involved dark matter, cosmic neutrinos, and their interactions.

== Early life ==
Okoli was born in Bauchi State, Nigeria, in 1987, the fifth of seven children in a Catholic Igbo family who had relocated there in the early 1970s, in the wake of the Nigerian Civil War. Her father owned a busing company and her mother worked as a schoolteacher. She was educated in a unity school, a multi-ethnic boarding school. After ethnic violence flared up in the 2000s in Bauchi, the family moved again to Awka-Etiti, and Okoli became a student of physics at the University of Nigeria in Nsukka (UNN). Despite some thoughts of transferring to medicine, she stayed in physics with the encouragement of Daniel Obiora, a physics professor at the university.

== Higher education and PhD ==
After earning a diploma from the International Centre for Theoretical Physics in Trieste, Italy, studying there with Ravi K. Sheth, Okoli came to the Perimeter Institute for Theoretical Physics in Waterloo, Canada, in 2012, as part of Perimeter Scholars International, a master's program at the institute. After completing the program in 2014, she continued her studies at the Perimeter Institute and the University of Waterloo, jointly advised by Perimeter Institute cosmologist Niayesh Afshordi and University of Waterloo astrophysicist James Taylor, and continuing through the birth of her son in 2017. She successfully defended her doctoral thesis in December 2018, and was scheduled to receive a diploma in June 2019.

== Illness and death ==
Instead, she suffered a series of two cerebral aneurysms, the first in February 2018 and the second, fatal one in June 2019.
