= 2025–26 Lincoln City F.C. season =

141st season in existence of Lincoln City FC

Lincoln City
2025–26 season
- Chairman: Clive Nates (until 4 February); Ron Fowler (from 4 February)
- Manager: Michael Skubala
- Stadium: LNER Stadium
- League One: 1st (champions)
- FA Cup: First round (vs. Salford City)
- EFL Cup: Third round (vs. Chelsea)
- EFL Trophy: Round of 32 (vs. Huddersfield Town)
- Top goalscorer: League: Jack Moylan; Reeco Hackett (11 each); All: Jack Moylan; Reeco Hackett; Rob Street (12 each)
- Highest home attendance: 10,235 vs Bolton Wanderers, 14 February 2026, League One
- Lowest home attendance: 2,016 vs Huddersfield Town, 2 December 2025, EFL Trophy
- Average home league attendance: 9,431
- Biggest win: 4–0 vs Northampton Town (H), 17 February 2026, League One; 4–0 vs Blackpool (H), 28 February 2026, League One
- Biggest defeat: 0–3 vs Rotherham United (A), 8 November 2025, League One
| Home colours | Away colours | Third colours |

The 2025–26 season is the 142nd season in the history of Lincoln City and their seventh consecutive season in League One. The club are participating in League One, the FA Cup, the EFL Cup, and the EFL Trophy.

== Season overview ==
=== June ===
On 5 June, the club launched their new home strip for the season, with Branston remaining their front of shirt sponsor.

=== July ===
On 3 July, the club launched their new away strip for the season.

On 10 July, Tendayi Darikwa was appointed the new club captain.

On 29 July, the club confirmed its squad numbers for the season.

On 31 July, the club launched their new third strip for the season.

=== August ===
On 11 August, directors Roger Bates, Sunil Hindocha, Herman Kok, Greg Levine, Steve Tointon, Chris Travers, and Nick Ragland all stood down from the clubs board, with the new board now consisting of Andrew Fowler, Ron Fowler, Harvey Jabara, David Lowes, Sean Melnick, Clive Nates (chair), Graham Rossini, Jay Wright (Vice-chair), Phil Scrafton, Amanda Slater, and Liam Scully.

On 26 August, Ivan Varfolomeev was called up to the Ukraine U21 squad.

=== September ===
On 3 September, lifelong Imps fan Jack Harvey joined the ownership group alongside his family, as well as further US investment through Ken Maurice Newcomer, Mark Talarico, Dan Marolis and Alexander Schreck.

=== October ===
On 3 October, Ivan Varfolomeev was called up to the Ukraine U21 squad.

On 4 October, Dexter Lembikisa was called up to the Jamaica squad.

On 6 October, Justin Obikwu was called up to the Trinidad and Tobago squad.

On 23 October, Lincoln City were fined £8,500 by The Football Association after supporters aimed "sectarian chants" at James McClean during their match against Wrexham on 3 May.

=== November ===
On 4 November, Ivan Varfolomeev was called up to the Ukraine U21 squad.

On 7 November, Rilmac finalised an agreement to sponsor the South Stand at the LNER Stadium and the back of the third kit.

On 8 November, Dexter Lembikisa was called up to the Jamaica squad.

=== January ===
On 14 January, Lincoln City confirmed that Liquid Investments, Inc were seeking to become the club's controlling shareholder, with Ron Fowler assuming the position of chairman.

On 14 January, the club published their annual accounts for the year ending June 2025.

On 21 January, the club were fined £16,000, following homophobic chanting aimed at the Chelsea fans in the EFL Cup earlier in the season.

On 26 January, the EFL have issued clearance for the change of control process which will see Liquid Investments Inc. increase their shareholding in the Imps and Ron Fowler become chairman on 4 February.

=== February ===
On 4 February, Ron Fowler became chair of Lincoln City Holdings and Lincoln City Football Club, with Clive Nates taking up his new role as co-vice chairman alongside Jay Wright.

=== March ===
On 16 March, Ryan Oné was called up to the Scotland U21 squad.

On 17 March, Ivan Varfolomeev was called up to the Ukraine U21 squad.

On 20 March, Kamil Conteh was called up the Sierra Leone squad.

=== April ===
On 6 April, they won promotion to the Championship, following their 2–1 win against Reading.

On 10 April, the club launched a special one-off kit to be warn on the final day of the season, inspired by Graham Taylor and his 1975–76 title winning side.

On 21 April, they became champions of League One, following their 2–0 win against Doncaster Rovers.

=== May ===
On 5 May, Jack Moylan was called up to the Republic of Ireland squad.

On 12 May, Lincoln City issued their squad update following the conclusion of the season.

On 25 May, Jack Moylan was called up to the Republic of Ireland squad.

== Current squad ==
As of 12 May 2026

| No. | Name | Position | Nationality | Place of birth | Date of birth (age) | Signed from | Date signed | Fee | Contract end |
Goalkeepers
| 1 | George Wickens | GK | (England) | Petersfield | 8 November 2001 (age 25) | Fulham | 20 July 2024 | Nominal Fee | 30 June 2028 |
| 13 | Zach Jeacock | GK | (England) | Birmingham | 8 May 2001 (age 25) | Birmingham City | 3 July 2024 | Free Transfer | 30 June 2029 |
| 21 | Jamie Pardington | GK | (England) | Aldridge | 20 July 2000 (age 26) | Cheltenham Town | 1 July 2024 | Free Transfer | 30 June 2026 |
Defenders
| 2 | Tendayi Darikwa | RB | (Zimbabwe) | Nottingham | 13 December 1991 (age 34) | Apollon Limassol | 5 July 2023 | Free Transfer | 30 June 2027 |
| 3 | Adam Reach | LB | (England) | Chester-le-Street | 3 February 1993 (age 33) | Wycombe Wanderers | 1 September 2025 | Free Transfer | 30 June 2027 |
| 5 | Adam Jackson | CB | (England) | Darlington | 18 May 1994 (age 32) | Hibernian | 11 August 2020 | Undisclosed | 30 June 2027 |
| 6 | Ryley Towler | CB | (England) | Bristol | 6 May 2002 (age 24) | Portsmouth | 7 July 2025 | Undisclosed | 30 June 2029 |
| 15 | Sonny Bradley | CB | (England) | Kingston upon Hull | 13 September 1991 (age 35) | Derby County | 1 July 2025 | Free Transfer | 30 June 2027 |
| 22 | Tom Hamer | CB | (England) | Bolton | 1 October 1999 (age 27) | Burton Albion | 19 July 2024 | Undisclosed | 30 June 2029 |
| 23 | Josh Honohan | LB | (Republic of Ireland) | Carrigaline | 28 March 2001 (age 25) | Shamrock Rovers | 1 January 2026 | Undisclosed | 30 June 2029 |
| 25 | Deji Elerewe | CB | (England) | Croydon | 14 September 2003 (age 23) | Bromley | 25 January 2026 | Undisclosed | 30 June 2029 |
Midfielders
| 8 | Tom Bayliss | CM | (England) | Leicester | 6 April 1999 (age 27) | Shrewsbury Town | 1 July 2024 | Free Transfer | 30 June 2028 |
| 14 | Conor McGrandles | CM | (Scotland) | Falkirk | 24 September 1995 (age 31) | Charlton Athletic | 14 June 2024 | Undisclosed | 30 June 2027 |
| 16 | Dom Jefferies | CM | (Wales) | Newport | 22 May 2002 (age 24) | Gillingham | 18 July 2024 | Undisclosed | 30 June 2028 |
| 24 | Ivan Varfolomeev | DM | (Ukraine) | Simferopol | 24 March 2004 (age 22) | Slovan Liberec | 21 August 2025 | Undisclosed | 30 June 2029 |
| 28 | Kamil Conteh | CM | (Sierra Leone) | Lambeth | 26 December 2002 (age 23) | Bristol Rovers | 2 February 2026 | Loan | 31 May 2026 |
Forwards
| 7 | Reeco Hackett | RW | (Saint Lucia) | Redbridge | 9 January 1998 (age 28) | Portsmouth | 14 June 2023 | Undisclosed | 30 June 2027 |
| 9 | James Collins | CF | (Republic of Ireland) | Coventry | 1 December 1990 (age 35) | Derby County | 20 January 2025 | Undisclosed | 30 June 2027 |
| 10 | Jack Moylan | AM | (Republic of Ireland) | Kilbarrack | 1 September 2001 (age 25) | Shelbourne | 1 January 2024 | Free Transfer | 30 June 2030 |
| 11 | Oscar Thorn | RW | (England) | Southend-on-Sea | 22 March 2004 (age 22) | Colchester United | 26 August 2025 | Undisclosed | 30 June 2029 |
| 12 | Erik Ring | LW | (Sweden) | Södertälje | 24 April 2002 (age 24) | AIK | 23 August 2024 | Undisclosed | 30 June 2028 |
| 17 | Rob Street | CF | (England) | Oxford | 26 September 2001 (age 25) | Cheltenham Town | 2 July 2024 | Undisclosed | 30 June 2030 |
| 18 | Ben House | CF | (Scotland) | Guildford | 5 July 1999 (age 27) | Eastleigh | 24 January 2022 | Undisclosed | 30 June 2028 |
| 19 | Alfie Lloyd | CF | (England) | Yeovil | 30 April 2003 (age 23) | Queens Park Rangers | 19 January 2026 | Loan | 31 May 2026 |
| 20 | Ryan Oné | CF | (Scotland) | Coatbridge | 26 June 2006 (age 20) | Sheffield United | 28 January 2026 | Loan | 31 May 2026 |
| 34 | Freddie Draper | CF | (England) | Oxford | 28 July 2004 (age 22) | Derby County | 1 July 2020 | Free Transfer | 30 June 2028 |
| 41 | Daniel Vanderpuye | CF | (England) | | 3 October 2007 (age 19) | Academy | —N/a | —N/a | —N/a |
Out on loan
| 26 | Oisin Gallagher | CM | (Republic of Ireland) | Derry | 2 December 2004 (age 21) | Derry City | 1 July 2021 | Undisclosed | 30 June 2027 |
| 35 | MJ Kamson-Kamara | CB | (England) | Farnborough | 14 February 2006 (age 20) | Academy | 23 February 2023 | —N/a | 30 June 2026 |
| 36 | Zane Okoro | RW | (United States) | Norwalk | 7 May 2007 (age 19) | Brooke House College | 19 June 2025 | —N/a | 30 June 2027 |
| 39 | Charlie Parks | CB | (England) | | 19 April 2007 (age 19) | Academy | 13 May 2025 | —N/a | 30 June 2027 |
| 40 | Noah Simmons | LB | (Wales) | | | Academy | —N/a | —N/a | —N/a |
| 42 | Charlie Carlisle | CB | (England) | | 23 October 2007 (age 19) | Academy | —N/a | —N/a | —N/a |
| | JJ McKiernan | CM | (Northern Ireland) | Southampton | 18 January 2002 (age 24) | Morecambe | 1 July 2024 | Nominal Fee | 30 June 2028 |

== Coaching staff ==
In June, chief scout Marc Tracy joined Luton Town in the same role and was replaced by Joe Hutchinson, who came in as the clubs head of talent identification from Grimsby Town. This was closely followed by assistant head coach Tom Shaw receiving his UEFA Pro Licence who also extended his contract in September until the summer of 2029. In July Bobby Copping joined as the clubs new head of commercial. Just before their pre-season friendly against Bromley, Lincoln confirmed that David Preece had returned as goalkeeping coach, with Scott Fry serving notice to join a Championship club. However, in October, Fry committed himself to Lincoln as their set-piece coach, by signing a new contract, but the following month the club accepted an offer that would see Fry join Scottish Premiership club Rangers. On 29 May, manager Michael Skubala left the club to join Bristol City with assistant head coaches Chris Cohen and Tom Shaw appointed joint head coaches.

As of 18 November 2025

| Role | Name |
|---|---|
| Head Coach | (England) Michael Skubala |
| Assistant Head Coach | (England) Chris Cohen |
| Assistant Head Coach | (England) Tom Shaw |
| Goalkeeping Coach | (England) David Preece |

== Pre-season and friendlies ==
On 5 June, Lincoln City announced their first pre-season friendlies against West Bromwich Albion and Grimsby Town, on top of a week-long warm weather training camp in Portugal. On 13 June, a friendly against Bromley was included for part of their tour of Portugal. On 23 June, the players reported back for pre-season training.

| 5 July 2025 Friendly | Hull City | 0–2 | Lincoln City | Kingston upon Hull |
| 11:00 BST | | Report | Collins 15'; Makama 85' | Stadium: Hull City AFC Training Ground; Attendance: 0 (Behind-closed-doors) |

| 8 July 2025 Friendly | Leicester City U21 | 0–1 | Lincoln City | Leicester |
| 13:00 BST | | Report | Collins | Stadium: Leicester City F.C. Training Ground; Attendance: 0 (Behind-closed-doors) |

| 11 July 2025 Friendly | Lincoln City | 3–5 | Huddersfield Town | Lincoln |
| | Collins; Draper; Hackett | Report | Hamer (o.g.); Wiles, Miller; Taylor | Stadium: Elite Performance Centre; Attendance: 0 (Behind-closed-doors) |

| 16 July 2025 Friendly | Bromley | 4–3 | Lincoln City | Ferreiras |
| 10:00 CEST | Thompson 13', 54'; Dinanga 38'; Kabamba 124' | Report | Moylan 48'; Hamer 99'; Towler 113' | Stadium: Estádio da Nora |

| 22 July 2025 Friendly | Grimsby Town | 2–1 | Lincoln City | Cleethorpes |
| 19:00 BST | Burns 15'; Vernam 32' | Report | Hackett 76' | Stadium: Blundell Park; Attendance: 2,143 |

| 26 July 2025 Friendly | Lincoln City | 4–2 | West Bromwich Albion | Lincoln |
| 15:00 BST | Makama 2', 3'; Towler 53'; Moylan 85' | Report | Grant 65'; Cole 90+3' | Stadium: LNER Stadium |

== Competitions ==
=== League One ===
==== League table ====
| Pos | Team | Pld | W | D | L | GF | GA | GD | Pts | Promotion, qualification or relegation |
|---|---|---|---|---|---|---|---|---|---|---|
| 1 | Lincoln City (C, P) | 46 | 31 | 10 | 5 | 89 | 41 | +48 | 103 | Promotion to EFL Championship |
| 2 | Cardiff City (P) | 46 | 27 | 10 | 9 | 90 | 50 | +40 | 91 | Promotion to EFL Championship |
| 3 | Stockport County | 46 | 22 | 11 | 13 | 71 | 58 | +13 | 77 | Qualification for League One play-offs |
| 4 | Bradford City | 46 | 22 | 11 | 13 | 58 | 51 | +7 | 77 | Qualification for League One play-offs |
| 5 | Bolton Wanderers (O, P) | 46 | 19 | 18 | 9 | 70 | 52 | +18 | 75 | Qualification for League One play-offs |

Source: EFL Official Website
Rules for classification: 1) Points; 2) Goal difference; 3) Number of goals scored; 4) Head-to-head results; 5) Wins; 6) Away goals; 7) Penalty points (sec 9.5); 8) 12-point sending off offences
(C) Champions; (O) Play-off winners; (P) Promoted

==== Results summary ====
| Overall | | | | | | | | Home | | | | | | Away | | | | | |
| Pld | W | D | L | GF | GA | GD | Pts | W | D | L | GF | GA | GD | W | D | L | GF | GA | GD |
|---|---|---|---|---|---|---|---|---|---|---|---|---|---|---|---|---|---|---|---|
| 46 | 31 | 10 | 5 | 89 | 41 | +48 | 103 | 18 | 4 | 1 | 53 | 20 | +33 | 13 | 6 | 4 | 36 | 21 | +15 |

Last updated: 2 May 2026.
Source: Soccerway

==== Results by round ====
| Round | 1 | 2 | 3 | 4 | 5 | 6 | 7 | 8 | 9 | 10 | 11 | 13 | 14 | 12^{1} | 15 | 16 | 17 | 18 | 19 | 20 | 21 | 22 | 23 | 24 | 25 | 27 | 28 | 29 | 30 | 31 | 32 | 33 | 34 | 35 | 36 | 26^{2} | 37 | 38 | 39 | 41 | 42 | 43 | 44 | 40^{3} | 45 | 46 |
|---|---|---|---|---|---|---|---|---|---|---|---|---|---|---|---|---|---|---|---|---|---|---|---|---|---|---|---|---|---|---|---|---|---|---|---|---|---|---|---|---|---|---|---|---|---|---|
| Ground | H | A | H | A | A | H | H | A | H | A | H | H | A | A | A | H | A | H | H | A | H | A | A | H | H | A | H | H | A | A | H | H | A | H | A | A | H | A | H | H | A | H | A | A | H | A |
| Result | W | L | W | W | D | D | D | W | W | W | L | W | L | D | L | W | L | W | W | D | W | W | W | D | W | D | W | W | W | W | D | W | W | W | W | W | W | D | W | W | W | W | D | W | W | W |
| Position | 4 | 14 | 11 | 7 | 7 | 9 | 8 | 7 | 3 | 3 | 4 | 6 | 6 | 5 | 6 | 2 | 3 | 4 | 3 | 3 | 2 | 2 | 2 | 2 | 2 | 2 | 2 | 2 | 2 | 2 | 2 | 2 | 2 | 2 | 1 | 1 | 1 | 1 | 1 | 1 | 1 | 1 | 1 | 1 | 1 | 1 |
| Points | 3 | 3 | 6 | 9 | 10 | 11 | 12 | 15 | 18 | 21 | 21 | 24 | 24 | 25 | 25 | 28 | 28 | 31 | 34 | 35 | 38 | 41 | 44 | 45 | 48 | 49 | 52 | 55 | 58 | 61 | 62 | 65 | 68 | 71 | 74 | 77 | 80 | 81 | 84 | 87 | 90 | 93 | 94 | 97 | 100 | 103 |

Updated to match(es) played on 2 May 2026. Source: [ Soccerway]
A = Away; H = Home; W = Win; D = Draw; L = Loss; P = Postponed
Notes:
- ^{1} Matchday 12 (vs Bradford City) was postponed due to the international call-ups.
- ^{2} Matchday 26 (vs Exeter City) was postponed due to Exeter's continued involvements in the FA Cup.
- ^{3} Matchday 40 (vs Doncaster Rovers) was postponed due to the international call-ups.

==== Matches ====
On Wednesday, 26 June 2025, the EFL League One fixtures were revealed.

| 2 August 2025 1 | Lincoln City | 2–0 | Reading | Lincoln |
| 15:00 BST | Burns 20' (o.g.); Hackett 67'; Bradley (yellow card) 73' | Report | | Stadium: LNER Stadium; Attendance: 9,054; Referee: Martin Woods |
Note: Live on Sky Sports

| 9 August 2025 2 | AFC Wimbledon | 2–0 | Lincoln City | Wimbledon |
| 15:00 BST | Stevens 41' (pen.); Asiimwe 77' | Report | Jackson (red card) 23' | Stadium: Cherry Red Records Stadium; Attendance: 8,067; Referee: Matthew Russell |

| 16 August 2025 3 | Lincoln City | 3–2 | Plymouth Argyle | Lincoln |
| 15:00 BST | Bayliss 6'; Towler (yellow card) 10'; Collins 59', 65' (pen.); Draper (yellow card) 70'; Street (yellow card) 74'; House (yellow card) 75'; Darikwa (yellow card) 90'; Hamilton (yellow card) 90+5' | Report | Ibrahim (yellow card) 23'; Watts (yellow card) 54'; Wiredu (yellow card) 74' (yellow-red card) 86'; Oseni 78'; Amaechi 80'; Galloway (yellow card) 90+3' | Stadium: LNER Stadium; Attendance: 8,503; Referee: Carl Brook |

| 19 August 2025 4 | Northampton Town | 0–1 | Lincoln City | Northampton |
| 19:45 BST | Wheatley (yellow card) 54'; Fornah (yellow card) 67'; Perkins (yellow card) 87' | Report | Draper 20'; Towler (yellow card) 42'; McGrandles (yellow card) 58'; Wickens (yellow card) 79'; Hamilton (yellow card) 86' | Stadium: Sixfields Stadium; Attendance: 5,729; Referee: Ollie Yates |
Note: Live on Sky Sports

| 23 August 2025 5 | Bolton Wanderers | 1–1 | Lincoln City | Bolton |
| 15:00 BST | Erhahon (yellow card) 22'; Conway (yellow card) 76'; Hamer 90+7' (o.g.) | Report | Draper 1'; Towler (yellow card) 60'; McGrandles (yellow card) 82' | Stadium: Toughsheet Community Stadium; Attendance: 19,938; Referee: Jacob Miles |

| 30 August 2025 6 | Lincoln City | 1–1 | Mansfield Town | Lincoln |
| 15:00 BST | Bradley 18', (red card) 30'; Draper (yellow card) 35'; Bayliss (yellow card) 52'; Hackett (yellow card) 53'; Towler (yellow card) 58'; Hamer (yellow card) 59'; Wickens (yellow card) 79' | Report | Dwyer (yellow card) 55'; Moriah-Welsh 82'; Cargill (yellow card) 87' | Stadium: LNER Stadium; Attendance: 9,626; Referee: Aaron Bannister |

| 6 September 2025 7 | Lincoln City | 2–2 | Wigan Athletic | Lincoln |
| 15:00 BST | Bayliss (yellow card) 24'; Darikwa (yellow card) 27'; Collins 31' (pen.), 34'; Street (yellow card) 64' (yellow-red card) 77'; Towler (yellow card) 79' | Report | Mullin 10'; Wright 50'; Saydee (red card) 68' | Stadium: LNER Stadium; Attendance: 8,208; Referee: Alan Young |

| 13 September 2025 8 | Burton Albion | 0–1 | Lincoln City | Burton upon Trent |
| 15:00 BST | Lofthouse (yellow card) 90+5'; Webster (yellow card) 90+6' | Report | Bradley 22'; McGrandles (yellow card) 36'; Jackson (yellow card) 45'; House (yellow card) 77' | Stadium: Pirelli Stadium; Attendance: 3,392; Referee: Matthew Corlett |

| 20 September 2025 9 | Lincoln City | 3–1 | Luton Town | Lincoln |
| 12:30 BST | House 12', 90'; Collins (yellow card) 17'; Obikwu 85' | Report | Lonwijk (yellow card) 24'; Yates (yellow card) 45+2'; Saville (yellow card) 53'; Mengi (yellow card) 55'; Gbodé (yellow card) 72'; Clark 77' | Stadium: LNER Stadium; Attendance: 9,255; Referee: Seb Stockbridge |
Note: Fixture was originally scheduled for a 15:00 kick-off, but was moved live Sky Sports broadcasting.

| 27 September 2025 10 | Peterborough United | 0–3 | Lincoln City | Peterborough |
| 15:00 BST | | Report | Reach 14'; Darikwa 60', (yellow card) 74'; McGrandles (yellow card) 76'; Obikwu 86' | Stadium: Weston Homes Stadium; Attendance: 9,943; Referee: Thomas Parsons |

| 4 October 2025 11 | Lincoln City | 0–1 | Exeter City | Lincoln |
| 15:00 BST | | Report | Whitworth (yellow card) 15'; McDonald 90+4'; Brierley (yellow card) 90+11' | Stadium: LNER Stadium; Attendance: 9,053; Referee: Andrew Humphries |

| 18 October 2025 13 | Lincoln City | 1–0 | Stevenage | Lincoln |
| 12:30 BST | Street 69'; House (yellow card) 90' | Report | Roberts (yellow card) 90' | Stadium: LNER Stadium; Attendance: 8,451; Referee: Martin Coy |
Note: Fixture was originally scheduled for a 15:00 kick-off, but was moved live Sky Sports broadcasting.

| 25 October 2025 14 | Leyton Orient | 1–0 | Lincoln City | Leyton |
| 15:00 BST | El Mizouni 62' | Report | Bayliss (yellow card) 39'; Hamer (yellow card) 90+4' | Stadium: BetWright Stadium; Attendance: 8,280; Referee: Stephen Parkinson |

| 28 October 2025 12 | Bradford City | 0–0 | Lincoln City | Bradford |
| 19:45 GMT | Metcalfe (yellow card) 38'; Power (yellow card) 76' | Report | | Stadium: University of Bradford Stadium; Attendance: 19,787; Referee: Elliot Bell |
Note: Fixture was postponed due to Lincoln City international call ups.

| 8 November 2025 15 | Rotherham United | 3–0 | Lincoln City | Rotherham |
| 15:00 GMT | James 10'; Martha 31'; Nombe (yellow card) 50'; Hall 59' | Report | Draper (yellow card) 61' | Stadium: AESSEAL New York Stadium; Attendance: 8,912; Referee: Alex Chilowicz |

| 15 November 2025 16 | Lincoln City | 2–1 | Doncaster Rovers | Lincoln |
| 15:00 GMT | Okoronkwo 31'; Collins (yellow card) 44'; Gotts 71' (o.g.); Jefferies (yellow card) 84' | Report | Broadbent (yellow card) 36'; Maxwell (yellow card) 38'; Hanlan 70', (yellow card) 90+6' | Stadium: LNER Stadium; Attendance: 9,812; Referee: David Rock |

| 22 November 2025 17 | Wycombe Wanderers | 3–2 | Lincoln City | High Wycombe |
| 15:00 GMT | Leahy (yellow card) 11'; Bell 16', 45'; Hendersen (yellow card) 67'; Grimmer 88' | Report | Moylan (yellow card) 53'; Obikwu 64'; Draper 76' | Stadium: Adams Park; Attendance: 4,872; Referee: Oliver Langford |

| 29 November 2025 18 | Lincoln City | 1–0 | Port Vale | Lincoln |
| 15:00 GMT | Hackett 33', (yellow card) 77'; Street (yellow card) 90'; House (yellow card) 90+5' | Report | Ojo (yellow card) 84'; John (yellow card) 89' | Stadium: LNER Stadium; Attendance: 8,503; Referee: Peter Wright |

| 9 December 2025 19 | Lincoln City | 3–1 | Barnsley | Lincoln |
| 19:45 GMT | Hackett 36', 71'; Bayliss 68' | Report | Connell (yellow card) 33'; Keillor-Dunn 67' | Stadium: LNER Stadium; Attendance: 7,768; Referee: Dale Baines |

| 13 December 2025 20 | Blackpool | 2–2 | Lincoln City | Blackpool |
| 15:00 GMT | Evans 34' (pen.); Fletcher 84'; Imray (yellow card) 90+3' | Report | Moylan 3'; Towler (yellow card) 11'; Bayliss (yellow card) 13'; Street 18' | Stadium: Bloomfield Road; Attendance: 9,227; Referee: Seb Stockbridge |

| 20 December 2025 21 | Lincoln City | 2–1 | Cardiff City | Lincoln |
| 15:00 GMT | Hamer (yellow card) 22'; McGrandles (yellow card) 34'; Robertson 40' (o.g.); Bradley 67'; Wickens (yellow card) 80' | Report | Kellyman (yellow card) 44'; Ng 49' | Stadium: LNER Stadium; Attendance: 9,913; Referee: Richard Eley |

| 26 December 2025 22 | Stockport County | 1–2 | Lincoln City | Stockport |
| 15:00 GMT | Onyango (yellow card) 30'; Norwood (penalty missed) 52', (yellow card) 63'; Fevrier 52' | Report | Hackett (yellow card) 26', (goal) 28'; Hamer (yellow card) 50'; Street 90+2' (pen.) | Stadium: Edgeley Park; Attendance: 9,690; Referee: Ollie Yates |

| 29 December 2025 23 | Barnsley | 0–2 | Lincoln City | Barnsley |
| 19:45 GMT | Earl (yellow card) 18'; Bland (yellow card) 56'; Connell (yellow card) 82'; Kelly (yellow card) 86' | Report | Hamer 8', (yellow card) 86'; Reach 72'; McGrandles (yellow card) 86' | Stadium: Oakwell; Attendance: 10,711; Referee: Paul Howard |

| 1 January 2026 24 | Lincoln City | 1–1 | Huddersfield Town | Lincoln |
| 15:00 GMT | McGrandles (yellow card) 62'; Reach 69', (yellow card) 86'; Draper (yellow card) 90' | Report | Castledine 61'; Sørensen (yellow card) 81'; May (yellow card) 90+4' | Stadium: LNER Stadium; Attendance: 10,110; Referee: Jamie O'Connor |

| 4 January 2026 25 | Lincoln City | 5–2 | Peterborough United | Lincoln |
| 12:30 GMT | Hackett 33'; Draper 45'; Darikwa 45+2', 90+1'; Reach 57'; Towler (yellow card) 70'; Obikwu (yellow card) 87' | Report | Leonard 24', (yellow card) 83'; Collins (yellow card) 36'; Lisbie 56', (yellow card) 61' | Stadium: LNER Stadium; Attendance: 9,833; Referee: Charles Breakspear |
Note: Fixture was originally scheduled for a 15:00 kick-off, but was moved live Sky Sports broadcasting.

| 17 January 2026 27 | Luton Town | 2–2 | Lincoln City | Luton |
| 15:00 GMT | Kodua 35'; Wells 45+3'; Bramall (yellow card) 49' | Report | Draper 11'; Street 22', (yellow card) 39'; Varfolomeev (yellow card) 45+6'; McGrandles (yellow card) 46'; Jefferies (yellow card) 75' | Stadium: Kenilworth Road; Attendance: 11,230; Referee: Scott Oldham |

| 22 January 2026 28 | Lincoln City | 2–1 | Burton Albion | Lincoln |
| 20:00 GMT | Moylan 35', 55'; Hamer (yellow card) 85'; Lloyd (yellow card) 89'; Darikwa (yellow card) 90' | Report | Beesley 37' | Stadium: LNER Stadium; Attendance: 9,514; Referee: Matthew Corlett |
Note: Fixture was originally scheduled for a 15:00 kick-off on 24 January, but was moved live Sky Sports broadcasting.

| 27 January 2026 29 | Lincoln City | 3–0 | Bradford City | Lincoln |
| 19:45 GMT | Draper 7'; Moylan 41'; Reach (yellow card) 52'; House 86' | Report | Pennington (yellow card) 43' | Stadium: LNER Stadium; Attendance: 10,064; Referee: Stephen Parkinson |

| 31 January 2026 30 | Wigan Athletic | 0–1 | Lincoln City | Wigan |
| 15:00 GMT | Moxon (yellow card) 74' | Report | Moylan 24'; Wickens (yellow card) 90+4' | Stadium: Brick Community Stadium; Attendance: 9,436; Referee: Carl Brook |

| 7 February 2026 31 | Plymouth Argyle | 1–4 | Lincoln City | Plymouth |
| 15:01 GMT | Harding (yellow card) 8'; Pepple 11'; Oseni (yellow card) 58' | Report | Varfolomeev (yellow card) 14'; Draper 38'; Hackett 53', 65'; Bayliss (yellow card) 79'; Oné (yellow card) 90+6', (goal) 90+7' | Stadium: Home Park; Attendance: 15,547; Referee: Stephen Martin |

| 14 February 2026 32 | Lincoln City | 1–1 | Bolton Wanderers | Lincoln |
| 15:00 GMT | Draper (yellow card) 17'; Varfolomeev (yellow card) 22'; Moylan 25' | Report | Erhahon (yellow card) 23'; Dempsey (yellow card) 35'; Dalby (yellow card) 45', (goal) 82'; Sheehan (yellow card) 88'; Kenny (yellow card) 90+3' | Stadium: LNER Stadium; Attendance: 10,235; Referee: Will Finnie |

| 17 February 2026 33 | Lincoln City | 4–0 | Northampton Town | Lincoln |
| 19:45 GMT | Oné 11'; Darikwa (yellow card) 30'; Moylan 51'; Varfolomeev 72'; Street 75' | Report | Vale (red card) 56'; Perkins (yellow card) 79' | Stadium: LNER Stadium; Attendance: 9,242; Referee: Kirsty Dowle |

| 21 February 2026 34 | Mansfield Town | 0–2 | Lincoln City | Mansfield |
| 15:00 GMT | Knoyle (yellow card) 17'; Reed (yellow card) 90+6' | Report | Varfolomeev (yellow card) 38'; Street 44' (pen.); Darikwa (yellow card) 77'; Bradley (yellow card) 82'; Bayliss 90+5' | Stadium: One Call Stadium; Attendance: 9,050; Referee: David Rock |

| 28 February 2026 35 | Lincoln City | 4–0 | Blackpool | Lincoln |
| 15:00 GMT | McGrandles 38'; Darikwa (yellow card) 51'; Street 78'; Jefferies 85'; Oné 89' | Report | Bowler (yellow card) 23'; Bloxham (yellow card) 36'; Honeyman (yellow card) 75'; Ashworth (yellow card) 90+3' | Stadium: LNER Stadium; Attendance: 9,812; Referee: Thomas Parsons |

| 7 March 2026 36 | Cardiff City | 0–2 | Lincoln City | Cardiff |
| 12:30 GMT | | Report | House (yellow card) 45+1'; Street 55'; Varfolomeev (yellow card) 60'; Jefferies 73'; Wickens (yellow card) 90+5' | Stadium: Cardiff City Stadium; Attendance: 27,280; Referee: Tom Reeves |
Note: Fixture was originally scheduled for a 15:00 kick-off, but was moved live Sky Sports broadcasting.

| 10 March 2026 26 | Exeter City | 0–1 | Lincoln City | Exeter |
| 19:45 GMT | Bycroft (yellow card) 45+4'; Magennis (yellow card) 90+7' | Report | Hamer 32'; Darikwa (yellow card) 36'; Bayliss (yellow card) 77'; Reach (yellow card) 88'; Bradley (yellow card) 90+7'; Jefferies (yellow card) 90+7' | Stadium: St James Park; Attendance: 5,142; Referee: Carl Brook |
Note: Fixture was initially scheduled for 10 January, but it was postponed due to Exeter's continued involvements in the FA Cup.

| 14 March 2026 37 | Lincoln City | 3–1 | Stockport County | Lincoln |
| 12:30 GMT | Moylan 10'; Towler (yellow card) 14'; Hamer (yellow card) 70'; Darikwa 87'; Lloyd 90+4' | Report | Diamond 68'; Norwood (yellow card) 78' | Stadium: LNER Stadium; Attendance: 9,759; Referee: Charles Breakspear |
Note: Fixture was originally scheduled for a 15:00 kick-off, but was moved live Sky Sports broadcasting.

| 17 March 2026 38 | Huddersfield Town | 2–2 | Lincoln City | Huddersfield |
| 19:45 GMT | Hardie 15'; Ledson 20'; Feeney (yellow card) 40'; Gooch (yellow card) 45+2'; Nicholls (yellow card) 90'; Humphreys (yellow card) 90+7' | Report | Feeney 29' (o.g.); Bayliss (yellow card) 79'; Towler 90+3', (yellow card) 90+3' | Stadium: Accu Stadium; Attendance: 16,301; Referee: Ben Speedie |

| 21 March 2026 39 | Lincoln City | 3–0 | Rotherham United | Lincoln |
| 15:00 GMT | Cann 18' (o.g.); House 34'; Hackett 45' | Report | Jules (yellow card) 90+3' | Stadium: LNER Stadium; Attendance: 10,071; Referee: Craig Hicks |

| 3 April 2026 41 | Lincoln City | 1–0 | AFC Wimbledon | Lincoln |
| 15:00 BST | Hackett (yellow card) 52'; Oné 88' | Report | Lewis (yellow card) 59'; Hackford (yellow card) 61'; Bishop (yellow card) 76'; Bugiel (yellow card) 90+2' | Stadium: LNER Stadium; Attendance: 10,088; Referee: Edward Duckworth |

| 6 April 2026 42 | Reading | 1–2 | Lincoln City | Reading |
| 15:00 BST | Burns (yellow card) 84'; Wing 90+2' | Report | Oné 2'; Jefferies (yellow card) 66'; Loyd (yellow card) 90+3'; Moylan 90+6' | Stadium: Select Car Leasing Stadium; Attendance: 17,144; Referee: Simon Mather |

| 11 April 2026 43 | Lincoln City | 2–1 | Leyton Orient | Lincoln |
| 12:30 BST | Moylan 19'; House (yellow card) 31'; Darikwa (yellow card) 45+1'; Forrester 45+5' (o.g.) | Report | Morris (yellow card) 5'; El Mizouni (yellow card) 17'; Simpson (yellow card) 37'; Abdulai (yellow card) 65'; Ballard 71' | Stadium: LNER Stadium; Attendance: 9,919; Referee: Ross Joyce |
Note: Fixture was originally scheduled for a 15:00 kick-off, but was moved live Sky Sports broadcasting.

| 18 April 2026 44 | Stevenage | 2–2 | Lincoln City | Stevenage |
| 15:00 BST | Thompson 3'; Reid 27' | Report | Darikwa 17'; Bradley (yellow card) 44'; Varfolomeev (yellow card) 54'; Street 90+1', (yellow card) 90+5' | Stadium: Lamex Stadium; Attendance: 5,647; Referee: Neil Hair |

| 21 April 2026 40 | Doncaster Rovers | 0–2 | Lincoln City | Doncaster |
| 19:45 GMT | Gotts (yellow card) 16'; Senior (yellow card) 33'; Grehan (yellow card) 74' | Report | Street (penalty missed) 22'; House 43', 72' | Stadium: Eco-Power Stadium; Attendance: 10,241; Referee: Seb Stockbridge |
Note: Fixture was postponed due to Lincoln City international call ups.

| 25 April 2026 45 | Lincoln City | 4–3 | Wycombe Wanderers | Lincoln |
| 15:00 BST | Moylan 34'; Hackett 38' (pen.), 53'; Bradley (yellow card) 50'; Varfolomeev (yellow card) 65'; Darikwa 83' | Report | Scowen 57'; Skura 74'; Woodrow 90+4'; Quitirna (yellow card) 90+6' | Stadium: LNER Stadium; Attendance: 10,125; Referee: Scott Oldham |

| 2 May 2026 46 | Port Vale | 0–2 | Lincoln City | Stoke-on-Trent |
| 15:00 BST | | Report | House 9'; McGrandles (yellow card) 22'; Street 49'; Conteh (yellow card) 73' | Stadium: Vale Park; Attendance: 8,980; Referee: Andrew Humphries |

=== FA Cup ===
The first round draw was made on 13 October, where Lincoln City were drawn away to Salford City.

| 1 November 2025 First round | Salford City | 1–1 (4–2 p) | Lincoln City | Salford |
| 15:00 GMT | Stockton (yellow card) 13'; Cesay (yellow card) 39'; Butcher (yellow card) 60'; Borini (yellow card) 72'; N'Mai 90+3' | Report | Ring 26'; Reach (yellow card) 33'; Towler (yellow card) 79'; Wickens (yellow card) 90+1'; Darikwa (yellow card) 110' (yellow-red card) 116' | Stadium: Peninsula Stadium; Attendance: 1,951; Referee: Steven Copeland |
| | Penalties |
| | Borini (penalty scored); Garbutt (penalty scored); Woodburn (penalty scored); Udoh (penalty scored) | | (penalty scored) Street; (penalty missed) Bayliss; (penalty scored) Obikwu; (penalty missed) McGrandles |

=== EFL Cup ===
On 26 June, the draw for the first round was made, with Lincoln City being drawn away against Harrogate Town. On 13 August, they were drawn away against either Tranmere Rovers or Burton Albion. On 19 August, Burton Albion would win their draw against Tranmere Rovers. The third round draw took place the following day and they were drawn against Chelsea.

| 12 August 2025 First round | Harrogate Town | 1–3 | Lincoln City | Harrogate |
| 19:45 BST | Taylor 90+5' | Report | Moylan 29'; Bayliss (yellow card) 48'; Draper 60'; Street 68' | Stadium: Exercise Stadium; Attendance: 2,119; Referee: Zac Kennard-Kettle |
Note: Live on Sky Sports

| 26 August 2025 Second round | Burton Albion | 0–1 | Lincoln City | Burton upon Trent |
| 19:45 BST | Larsson (yellow card) 11'; Newall (yellow card) 57'; Tavares (yellow card) 88' | Report | Varfolomeev (yellow card) 72'; Jackson (yellow card) 73'; House 89' | Stadium: Pirelli Stadium; Attendance: 1,837; Referee: Oliver Mackey |
Note: Live on Sky Sports

| 23 September 2025 Third round | Lincoln City | 1–2 | Chelsea | Lincoln |
| 19:45 BST | Street 42'; Draper (yellow card) 56'; House (yellow card) 63'; Collins (yellow card) 83' | Report | Santos (yellow card) 22'; George 48'; Buonanotte 50'; Fernández (yellow card) 54'; Jörgensen (yellow card) 90'; Cucurella (yellow card) 90+3' | Stadium: LNER Stadium; Attendance: 10,214; Referee: Matt Donohue |
Note: Live on Sky Sports

=== EFL Trophy ===
The Imps were drawn into Group D of the Northern section alongside Barnsley, Notts County and Manchester United U21. On 13 November, they were drawn a home tie, for winning their group, against Huddersfield Town.

| Pos | Div | Team | Pld | W | PW | PL | L | GF | GA | GD | Pts | Qualification |
|---|---|---|---|---|---|---|---|---|---|---|---|---|
| 1 | L1 | Lincoln City | 3 | 3 | 0 | 0 | 0 | 8 | 0 | +8 | 9 | Advance to Round 2 |
| 2 | L1 | Barnsley | 3 | 1 | 0 | 0 | 2 | 6 | 6 | 0 | 3 | Advance to Round 2 |
| 3 | ACA | Manchester United U21 | 3 | 1 | 0 | 0 | 2 | 4 | 8 | −4 | 3 | |
| 4 | L2 | Notts County | 3 | 1 | 0 | 0 | 2 | 2 | 6 | −4 | 3 | |

Source: EFL

| 2 September 2025 North Group D | Lincoln City | 3–0 | Notts County | Lincoln |
| 19:00 BST | Bradley 8'; House (yellow card) 43', (goal) 58'; Collins 76'; Thorn (yellow card) 85'; McGrandles (yellow card) 87' | Report | | Stadium: LNER Stadium; Attendance: 2,526; Referee: Greg Rollason |
Note: Live on Sky Sports

| 30 September 2025 North Group D | Lincoln City | 3–0 | Manchester United U21 | Lincoln |
| 19:00 BST | Varfolomeev (yellow card) 25'; Towler (yellow card) 30'; Hamer 47'; Ring 67'; Hackett 88' | Report | Devaney (yellow card) 32' | Stadium: LNER Stadium; Attendance: 3,347; Referee: Jamie O'Connor |
Note: Live on Sky Sports

| 11 November 2025 North Group D | Barnsley | 0–2 | Lincoln City | Barnsley |
| 19:00 GMT | Graham (yellow card) 86' | Report | Okoronkwo 29'; Collins 61' | Stadium: Oakwell; Attendance: 1,202; Referee: Jacob Miles |
Note: Live on Sky Sports

| 2 December 2025 Round of 32 | Lincoln City | 0–2 | Huddersfield Town | Lincoln |
| 19:00 GMT | Varfolomeev (yellow card) 22'; Draper (yellow card) 40' | Report | Taylor 49'; Kasumu (yellow card) 61'; Wallace 90' | Stadium: LNER Stadium; Attendance: 2,016; Referee: Ben Speedie |
Note: Live on Sky Sports

== Transfers & contracts ==
=== In ===
| Date | Pos | Player | From | Fee | Ref |
|---|---|---|---|---|---|
| 1 July 2025 (Note: The transfer was announced on 20 June, and would become official on July 1 once his Derby County contract expired) | CB | (England) Sonny Bradley | (England) Derby County | Free | |
| 7 July 2025 | CB | (England) Ryley Towler | (England) Portsmouth | Undisclosed | |
| 21 August 2025 | DM | (Ukraine) Ivan Varfolomeev | (Czech Republic) Slovan Liberec | Undisclosed | |
| 26 August 2025 | RW | (England) Oscar Thorn | (England) Colchester United | Undisclosed | |
| 1 September 2025 | LB | (England) Adam Reach | (England) Wycombe Wanderers | Free | |
| 1 January 2026 (Note: The transfer was announced on 18 December, and would become official on January 1 once the transfer window opened) | LB | (Republic of Ireland) Josh Honohan | (Republic of Ireland) Shamrock Rovers | Undisclosed | |
| 25 January 2026 | CB | (England) Deji Elerewe | (England) Bromley | Undisclosed | |

=== Out ===
| Date | Pos | Player | To | Fee | Ref |
|---|---|---|---|---|---|
| 26 June 2025 | CB | (England) Zak Bradshaw | (England) Cambridge United | Free | |
| 25 July 2025 | CM | (Scotland) Ethan Erhahon | (England) Bolton Wanderers | Undisclosed | |
| 4 August 2025 | CF | (England) Jovon Makama | (England) Norwich City | Undisclosed | |
| 26 August 2025 | CM | (Scotland) Ethan Hamilton | (Scotland) Dundee | Undisclosed | |
| 2 February 2026 | CB | (Netherlands) Lewis Montsma | (Scotland) Dundee | Undisclosed | |

=== Loaned in ===
| Date | Pos | Player | Loaned from | Date until | Ref |
|---|---|---|---|---|---|
| 18 August 2025 | CF | (England) Francis Okoronkwo | (England) Everton | 6 January 2026 (Note: Francis Okoronkwo was recalled from his loan on 6 January 2026) | |
| 1 September 2025 | DM | (England) Finley Barbrook | (England) Ipswich Town | 6 January 2026 (Note: Finley Barbrook was recalled from his loan on 6 January 2026) | |
| 1 September 2025 | CF | (Trinidad and Tobago) Justin Obikwu | (England) Coventry City | 17 January 2026 (Note: Justin Obikwu was recalled from his loan on 17 January 2026) | |
| 1 September 2025 | RB | (Jamaica) Dexter Lembikisa | (England) Wolverhampton Wanderers | 2 January 2026 | |
| 19 January 2026 | CF | (England) Alfie Lloyd | (England) Queens Park Rangers | End of season | |
| 28 January 2026 | CF | (Scotland) Ryan Oné | (England) Sheffield United | End of season | |
| 2 February 2026 | CM | (Sierra Leone) Kamil Conteh | (England) Bristol Rovers | End of season | |

=== Loaned out ===
| Date | Pos | Player | Loaned to | Date until | Ref |
|---|---|---|---|---|---|
| 23 June 2025 | CM | (Northern Ireland) JJ McKiernan | (England) Burton Albion | End of season | |
| 15 July 2025 | CB | (England) Charlie Carlisle | (England) Lincoln United | End of season | |
| 29 August 2025 | CB | (England) MJ Kamson-Kamara | (Northern Ireland) Glentoran | End of season | |
| 1 September 2025 | RW | (United States) Zane Okoro | (Northern Ireland) Coleraine | End of season | |
| 5 September 2025 | CF | (England) Daniel Vanderpuye | (England) Gainsborough Trinity | Work experience | |
| 19 September 2025 | CM | (England) Gbolahan Okewoye | (England) Billericay Town | 18 October 2025 (Note: Gbolahan Okewoye was recalled from his loan on 18 October 2025) | |
| 11 October 2025 | GK | (England) Jamie Pardington | (England) AFC Telford United | 18 October 2025 (Note: Jamie Pardington was recalled from his loan on 18 October 2025) | |
| 31 October 2025 | CF | (England) Daniel Vanderpuye | (England) Lincoln United | Work experience | |
| 15 November 2025 | CM | (Republic of Ireland) Oisin Gallagher | (England) Boston United | End of season (Note: Oisin Gallagher's loan was extended until the end of the season on 7 January 2026) | |
| 22 November 2025 | GK | (England) Jamie Pardington | (England) Oxford City | 10 January 2026 | |
| 25 November 2025 | CB | (England) Charlie Parks | (England) Gainsborough Trinity | 10 January 2026 | |
| 19 December 2025 | LB | (Wales) Noah Simmons | (England) Loughborough Students | Work experience | |
| 19 December 2025 | CF | (England) Daniel Vanderpuye | (England) Loughborough Students | Work experience | |
| 15 February 2026 | GK | (England) Jaden Taylor | (England) Pinchbeck United | Work experience | |
| 24 March 2026 | GK | (England) Jamie Pardington | (England) Kidderminster Harriers | 30 March 2026 | |
| 25 March 2026 | GK | (England) Jaden Taylor | (England) Hucknall Town | Work experience | |
| 26 March 2026 | DF | (England) Orin Aldridge | (England) Pinchbeck United | End of season | |

=== Released / Out of Contract ===
| Date | Pos | Player | Subsequent club | Join date | Ref |
|---|---|---|---|---|---|
| 30 June 2025 | RB | (England) Jay Benn | (England) Hartlepool United | 1 July 2025 | |
| 30 June 2025 | CM | (England) Sam Clucas | (England) Shrewsbury Town | 1 July 2025 | |
| 30 June 2025 | CB | (Republic of Ireland) Paudie O'Connor | (England) Reading | 1 July 2025 | |
| 30 June 2025 | LB | (Republic of Ireland) Sean Roughan | (England) Huddersfield Town | 1 July 2025 | |
| 30 June 2025 | CM | (England) Alistair Smith | (England) AFC Wimbledon | 1 July 2025 | |
| 30 June 2025 | CF | (England) Tyler Walker | (England) Barrow | 1 July 2025 | |
| 30 June 2025 | CM | (England) Denny Oliver | (England) Sheffield Wednesday | 2 July 2025 | |
| 30 June 2025 | GK | (England) Isaac Allan | (England) Sunderland | 19 July 2025 | |
| 30 June 2025 | RB | (England) Kelly Fombad | (England) Melton Town | 27 July 2025 | |
| 30 June 2025 | RW | (England) Dakara Wifa | (England) Cobham | 27 September 2025 | |
| 30 June 2025 | RB | (England) Carter Ford | (England) Athletic Newham | 1 November 2025 | |
| 30 June 2025 | CB | (England) Resharne McLean | (United States) USAO | 14 February 2026 | |
| 2 February 2026 | CM | (England) Gbolahan Okewoye | (England) Cray Valley Paper Mills | 13 March 2026 | |
| 30 June 2025 | GK | (Romania) Nicolae-Mario Vasiloiu | | | |

=== Contracts ===
| Date | Pos | Player | Length | Expiry | Ref |
|---|---|---|---|---|---|
| 19 June 2025 | RW | (United States) Zane Okoro | 2 years | 30 June 2027 | |
| 30 July 2025 | CB | (England) Adam Jackson | 2 years | 30 June 2027 | |
| 31 July 2025 | CM | (England) Tom Bayliss | 3 years | 30 June 2028 | |
| 15 October 2025 | CF | (Scotland) Ben House | 2.5 years | 30 June 2028 | |
| 19 November 2025 | GK | (England) Zach Jeacock | 3.5 years | 30 June 2029 | |
| 7 January 2026 | CM | (Republic of Ireland) Oisin Gallagher | One-year option | 30 June 2027 | |
| 12 January 2026 | RB | (Zimbabwe) Tendayi Darikwa | One-year option | 30 June 2027 | |
| 12 January 2026 | RW | (Saint Lucia) Reeco Hackett | One-year option | 30 June 2027 | |
| 12 January 2026 | CM | (Scotland) Conor McGrandles | One-year option | 30 June 2027 | |
| 13 January 2026 | CF | (Republic of Ireland) James Collins | One-year option | 30 June 2027 | |
| 26 January 2026 | LB | (England) Adam Reach | One-year option | 30 June 2027 | |
| 2 February 2026 | CM | (Wales) Dom Jefferies | Two-year option | 30 June 2028 | |
| 6 March 2026 | CB | (England) Tom Hamer | 3.5 years | 30 June 2029 | |
| 13 March 2026 | AM | (Republic of Ireland) Jack Moylan | 4.5 years | 30 June 2030 | |
| 12 May 2026 | CF | (England) Rob Street | 4 years | 30 June 2030 | |

== Squad statistics ==
=== Appearances ===
As of 2 May 2026

| No. | Pos | Nat | Player | Total | | League One | | FA Cup | | EFL Cup | | EFL Trophy | |
| No. | Pos | Nat | Player | Apps | Goals | Apps | Goals | Apps | Goals | Apps | Goals | Apps | Goals |
|---|---|---|---|---|---|---|---|---|---|---|---|---|---|
| 1 | GK | (England) ENG | George Wickens | 47 | 0 | 46 | 0 | 1 | 0 | 0 | 0 | 0 | 0 |
| 2 | DF | (Zimbabwe) ZIM | Tendayi Darikwa | 51 | 6 | 45 | 6 | 1 | 0 | 3 | 0 | 1+1 | 0 |
| 3 | DF | (England) ENG | Adam Reach | 34 | 4 | 29+2 | 4 | 1 | 0 | 0 | 0 | 1+1 | 0 |
| 5 | DF | (England) ENG | Adam Jackson | 14 | 0 | 9+1 | 0 | 1 | 0 | 1 | 0 | 2 | 0 |
| 6 | DF | (England) ENG | Ryley Towler | 48 | 1 | 22+18 | 1 | 1 | 0 | 3 | 0 | 3+1 | 0 |
| 7 | FW | (Saint Lucia) LCA | Reeco Hackett | 47 | 12 | 36+7 | 11 | 0 | 0 | 0+2 | 0 | 1+1 | 1 |
| 8 | MF | (England) ENG | Tom Bayliss | 47 | 3 | 26+14 | 3 | 0+1 | 0 | 2+1 | 0 | 1+2 | 0 |
| 9 | FW | (Republic of Ireland) IRL | James Collins | 25 | 6 | 13+5 | 4 | 1 | 0 | 0+3 | 0 | 2+1 | 2 |
| 10 | FW | (Republic of Ireland) IRL | Jack Moylan | 34 | 12 | 27+4 | 11 | 0 | 0 | 1 | 1 | 0+2 | 0 |
| 11 | FW | (England) ENG | Oscar Thorn | 6 | 0 | 0+3 | 0 | 0 | 0 | 0 | 0 | 3 | 0 |
| 12 | FW | (Sweden) SWE | Erik Ring | 19 | 2 | 1+11 | 0 | 1 | 1 | 2 | 0 | 4 | 1 |
| 13 | GK | (England) ENG | Zach Jeacock | 7 | 0 | 0 | 0 | 0 | 0 | 3 | 0 | 4 | 0 |
| 14 | MF | (Scotland) SCO | Conor McGrandles | 50 | 1 | 45 | 1 | 1 | 0 | 1+2 | 0 | 0+1 | 0 |
| 15 | DF | (England) ENG | Sonny Bradley | 51 | 4 | 45 | 3 | 0+1 | 0 | 2 | 0 | 1+2 | 1 |
| 16 | MF | (Wales) WAL | Dom Jefferies | 29 | 2 | 4+23 | 2 | 0 | 0 | 0 | 0 | 2 | 0 |
| 17 | FW | (England) ENG | Rob Street | 54 | 12 | 38+8 | 10 | 0+1 | 0 | 3 | 2 | 1+3 | 0 |
| 18 | FW | (Scotland) SCO | Ben House | 38 | 9 | 24+10 | 7 | 1 | 0 | 1+1 | 1 | 1 | 1 |
| 19 | FW | (England) ENG | Alfie Lloyd | 18 | 1 | 1+17 | 1 | 0 | 0 | 0 | 0 | 0 | 0 |
| 20 | FW | (Scotland) SCO | Ryan Oné | 16 | 5 | 7+9 | 5 | 0 | 0 | 0 | 0 | 0 | 0 |
| 22 | DF | (England) ENG | Tom Hamer | 50 | 3 | 38+6 | 2 | 0 | 0 | 3 | 0 | 2+1 | 1 |
| 24 | MF | (Ukraine) UKR | Ivan Varfolomeev | 36 | 1 | 19+12 | 1 | 1 | 0 | 2 | 0 | 2 | 0 |
| 25 | DF | (England) ENG | Deji Elerewe | 10 | 0 | 2+8 | 0 | 0 | 0 | 0 | 0 | 0 | 0 |
| 28 | MF | (Sierra Leone) SLE | Kamil Conteh | 1 | 0 | 0+1 | 0 | 0 | 0 | 0 | 0 | 0 | 0 |
| 34 | FW | (England) ENG | Freddie Draper | 40 | 8 | 26+7 | 7 | 1 | 0 | 2+1 | 1 | 1+2 | 0 |
| 40 | DF | (Wales) WAL | Noah Simmons | 1 | 0 | 0 | 0 | 0 | 0 | 0+1 | 0 | 0 | 0 |
Players out on loan:
| 26 | MF | (Republic of Ireland) IRL | Oisin Gallagher | 1 | 0 | 0 | 0 | 0 | 0 | 0 | 0 | 1 | 0 |
| 36 | FW | (United States) USA | Zane Okoro | 3 | 0 | 0+1 | 0 | 0 | 0 | 1+1 | 0 | 0 | 0 |
Players that left the club mid-season:
| 4 | DF | (Netherlands) NED | Lewis Montsma | 4 | 0 | 0 | 0 | 0+1 | 0 | 1 | 0 | 2 | 0 |
| 11 | MF | (Scotland) SCO | Ethan Hamilton | 6 | 0 | 0+5 | 0 | 0 | 0 | 1 | 0 | 0 | 0 |
| 19 | FW | (England) ENG | Francis Okoronkwo | 20 | 2 | 3+10 | 1 | 0+1 | 0 | 1+1 | 0 | 3+1 | 1 |
| 20 | FW | (Trinidad and Tobago) TTO | Justin Obikwu | 21 | 3 | 4+13 | 3 | 0+1 | 0 | 0+1 | 0 | 1+1 | 0 |
| 23 | DF | (Jamaica) JAM | Dexter Lembikisa | 5 | 0 | 0+3 | 0 | 0 | 0 | 0 | 0 | 2 | 0 |
| 25 | MF | (England) ENG | Finley Barbrook | 3 | 0 | 0 | 0 | 0 | 0 | 0 | 0 | 3 | 0 |
| 37 | MF | (England) ENG | Gbolahan Okewoye | 1 | 0 | 0 | 0 | 0 | 0 | 0+1 | 0 | 0 | 0 |

=== Goalscorers ===
As of 2 May 2026

| Rank | Pos. | Nat. | No. | Player | League One | FA Cup | EFL Cup | EFL Trophy | Total |
|---|---|---|---|---|---|---|---|---|---|
| 1 | MF | (Saint Lucia) | 7 | Reeco Hackett | 11 | 0 | 0 | 1 | 12 |
| 1 | MF | (Republic of Ireland) | 10 | Jack Moylan | 11 | 0 | 1 | 0 | 12 |
| 1 | FW | (England) | 17 | Rob Street | 10 | 0 | 2 | 0 | 12 |
| 2 | FW | (Scotland) | 18 | Ben House | 7 | 0 | 1 | 1 | 9 |
| 3 | FW | (England) | 34 | Freddie Draper | 7 | 0 | 1 | 0 | 8 |
| 4 | DF | (Zimbabwe) | 2 | Tendayi Darikwa | 6 | 0 | 0 | 0 | 6 |
| 4 | FW | (Republic of Ireland) | 9 | James Collins | 4 | 0 | 0 | 2 | 6 |
| 5 | FW | (Scotland) | 20 | Ryan Oné | 5 | 0 | 0 | 0 | 5 |
| 6 | DF | (England) | 3 | Adam Reach | 4 | 0 | 0 | 0 | 4 |
| 6 | DF | (England) | 15 | Sonny Bradley | 3 | 0 | 0 | 1 | 4 |
| 7 | MF | (England) | 8 | Tom Bayliss | 3 | 0 | 0 | 0 | 3 |
| 7 | FW | (Trinidad and Tobago) | 20 | Justin Obikwu | 3 | 0 | 0 | 0 | 3 |
| 7 | DF | (England) | 22 | Tom Hamer | 2 | 0 | 0 | 1 | 3 |
| 8 | FW | (Sweden) | 12 | Erik Ring | 0 | 1 | 0 | 1 | 2 |
| 8 | MF | (Wales) | 16 | Dom Jefferies | 2 | 0 | 0 | 0 | 2 |
| 8 | FW | (England) | 19 | Francis Okoronkwo | 1 | 0 | 0 | 1 | 2 |
| 9 | DF | (England) | 6 | Ryley Towler | 1 | 0 | 0 | 0 | 1 |
| 9 | MF | (Scotland) | 14 | Conor McGrandles | 1 | 0 | 0 | 0 | 1 |
| 9 | FW | (England) | 19 | Alfie Lloyd | 1 | 0 | 0 | 0 | 1 |
| 9 | MF | (Ukraine) | 24 | Ivan Varfolomeev | 1 | 0 | 0 | 0 | 1 |
| Own goals | | | | | 6 | 0 | 0 | 0 | 6 |
| Total | | | | | 89 | 1 | 5 | 8 | 103 |

=== Assists ===
As of 2 May 2026

| Rank | Pos. | Nat. | No. | Player | League One | FA Cup | EFL Cup | EFL Trophy | Total |
|---|---|---|---|---|---|---|---|---|---|
| 1 | MF | (Saint Lucia) | 7 | Reeco Hackett | 8 | 0 | 0 | 0 | 8 |
| 2 | MF | (Republic of Ireland) | 10 | Jack Moylan | 6 | 0 | 0 | 0 | 6 |
| 2 | MF | (Scotland) | 14 | Conor McGrandles | 6 | 0 | 0 | 0 | 6 |
| 3 | DF | (England) | 3 | Adam Reach | 4 | 0 | 0 | 1 | 5 |
| 3 | FW | (England) | 17 | Rob Street | 4 | 0 | 1 | 0 | 5 |
| 3 | DF | (England) | 22 | Tom Hamer | 5 | 0 | 0 | 0 | 5 |
| 4 | GK | (England) | 1 | George Wickens | 4 | 0 | 0 | 0 | 4 |
| 4 | DF | (Zimbabwe) | 2 | Tendayi Darikwa | 3 | 1 | 0 | 0 | 4 |
| 4 | FW | (England) | 34 | Freddie Draper | 3 | 0 | 1 | 0 | 4 |
| 5 | DF | (England) | 6 | Ryley Towler | 3 | 0 | 0 | 0 | 3 |
| 5 | MF | (Ukraine) | 24 | Ivan Varfolomeev | 1 | 0 | 1 | 1 | 3 |
| 6 | MF | (England) | 8 | Tom Bayliss | 2 | 0 | 0 | 0 | 2 |
| 6 | FW | (Republic of Ireland) | 9 | James Collins | 1 | 0 | 1 | 0 | 2 |
| 6 | MF | (Sweden) | 12 | Erik Ring | 0 | 0 | 0 | 2 | 2 |
| 6 | MF | (Wales) | 16 | Dom Jefferies | 2 | 0 | 0 | 0 | 2 |
| 6 | FW | (Scotland) | 18 | Ben House | 2 | 0 | 0 | 0 | 2 |
| 7 | DF | (England) | 5 | Adam Jackson | 0 | 0 | 0 | 1 | 1 |
| 7 | DF | (England) | 15 | Sonny Bradley | 1 | 0 | 0 | 0 | 1 |
| 7 | FW | (England) | 19 | Alfie Lloyd | 1 | 0 | 0 | 0 | 1 |
| 7 | FW | (Trinidad and Tobago) | 20 | Justin Obikwu | 1 | 0 | 0 | 0 | 1 |
| 7 | DF | (Jamaica) | 23 | Dexter Lembikisa | 0 | 0 | 0 | 1 | 1 |
| Total | | | | | 57 | 1 | 4 | 6 | 68 |

=== Disciplinary record ===
As of 2 May 2026

| No. | Pos. | Player | League One | | FA Cup | | EFL Cup | | EFL Trophy | | Total | |
| No. | Pos. | Player | Yellow card | Red card | Yellow card | Red card | Yellow card | Red card | Yellow card | Red card | Yellow card | Red card |
|---|---|---|---|---|---|---|---|---|---|---|---|---|
| 1 | GK | George Wickens | 5 | 0 | 1 | 0 | 0 | 0 | 0 | 0 | 6 | 0 |
| 2 | DF | Tendayi Darikwa | 9 | 0 | 1 | 1 | 0 | 0 | 0 | 0 | 10 | 1 |
| 3 | DF | Adam Reach | 3 | 0 | 1 | 0 | 0 | 0 | 0 | 0 | 4 | 0 |
| 5 | DF | Adam Jackson | 1 | 1 | 0 | 0 | 1 | 0 | 0 | 0 | 2 | 1 |
| 6 | DF | Ryley Towler | 9 | 0 | 1 | 0 | 0 | 0 | 1 | 0 | 11 | 0 |
| 7 | MF | Reeco Hackett | 4 | 0 | 0 | 0 | 0 | 0 | 0 | 0 | 4 | 0 |
| 8 | MF | Tom Bayliss | 7 | 0 | 0 | 0 | 1 | 0 | 0 | 0 | 8 | 0 |
| 9 | FW | James Collins | 2 | 0 | 0 | 0 | 1 | 0 | 0 | 0 | 3 | 0 |
| 10 | MF | Jack Moylan | 1 | 0 | 0 | 0 | 0 | 0 | 0 | 0 | 1 | 0 |
| 11 | MF | Ethan Hamilton | 2 | 0 | 0 | 0 | 0 | 0 | 0 | 0 | 2 | 0 |
| 11 | FW | Oscar Thorn | 0 | 0 | 0 | 0 | 0 | 0 | 1 | 0 | 1 | 0 |
| 14 | MF | Conor McGrandles | 9 | 0 | 0 | 0 | 0 | 0 | 1 | 0 | 10 | 0 |
| 15 | DF | Sonny Bradley | 5 | 1 | 0 | 0 | 0 | 0 | 0 | 0 | 5 | 1 |
| 16 | MF | Dom Jefferies | 4 | 0 | 0 | 0 | 0 | 0 | 0 | 0 | 4 | 0 |
| 17 | FW | Rob Street | 5 | 1 | 0 | 0 | 0 | 0 | 0 | 0 | 5 | 1 |
| 18 | FW | Ben House | 6 | 0 | 0 | 0 | 1 | 0 | 1 | 0 | 8 | 0 |
| 19 | FW | Alfie Lloyd | 2 | 0 | 0 | 0 | 0 | 0 | 0 | 0 | 2 | 0 |
| 20 | FW | Justin Obikwu | 1 | 0 | 0 | 0 | 0 | 0 | 0 | 0 | 1 | 0 |
| 20 | FW | Ryan Oné | 1 | 0 | 0 | 0 | 0 | 0 | 0 | 0 | 1 | 0 |
| 22 | DF | Tom Hamer | 7 | 0 | 0 | 0 | 0 | 0 | 0 | 0 | 7 | 0 |
| 24 | MF | Ivan Varfolomeev | 7 | 0 | 0 | 0 | 1 | 0 | 2 | 0 | 10 | 0 |
| 28 | MF | Kamil Conteh | 1 | 0 | 0 | 0 | 0 | 0 | 0 | 0 | 1 | 0 |
| 34 | FW | Freddie Draper | 5 | 0 | 0 | 0 | 1 | 0 | 1 | 0 | 7 | 0 |

=== Clean sheets ===
As of 2 May 2026

| No. | Nat. | Player | Matches played | Clean sheet % | League One | FA Cup | EFL Cup | EFL Trophy | Total |
|---|---|---|---|---|---|---|---|---|---|
| 1 | (England) | George Wickens | 47 | 40.43% | 19 | 0 | 0 | 0 | 19 |
| 13 | (England) | Zach Jeacock | 7 | 57.14% | 0 | 0 | 1 | 3 | 4 |

== Awards ==
=== Club End of Season Awards ===
| Award | Player | Ref. |
|---|---|---|
| Player of the Year | (England) Sonny Bradley | |
| Players Player of the Year | (Scotland) Conor McGrandles | |
| Young Player of the Year | (Ukraine) Ivan Varfolomeev | |
| Golden Boot | (Republic of Ireland) Jack Moylan (Saint Lucia) Reeco Hackett | |
| Goal of the Season | (England) Adam Reach | |
| Community Player of the Year | (Zimbabwe) Tendayi Darikwa | |

=== EFL League One Manager of the Month ===
| Month | Manager | | Ref. |
|---|---|---|---|
| September | (England) Michael Skubala | Winner | |
| December | (England) Michael Skubala | Nomination | |
| January | (England) Michael Skubala | Winner | |
| February | (England) Michael Skubala | Winner | |
| March | (England) Michael Skubala | Nomination | |
| April | (England) Michael Skubala | Winner | |

=== EFL League One Manager of the Season ===
| Manager | | Ref. |
|---|---|---|
| (England) Michael Skubala | Winner | |

=== EFL League One Player of the Month ===
| Month | Player | | Ref. |
|---|---|---|---|
| January | (Republic of Ireland) Jack Moylan | Nomination | |
| March | (England) Sonny Bradley | Nomination | |
| April | (Zimbabwe) Tendayi Darikwa | Nomination | |

=== EFL League One Player of the Season ===
| Player | | Ref. |
|---|---|---|
| (Republic of Ireland) Jack Moylan | Nomination | |
| (England) Sonny Bradley | Nomination | |

=== EFL League One Team of the Season ===
| Player | Ref. |
|---|---|
| (England) George Wickens | |
(Zimbabwe) Tendayi Darikwa
(England) Sonny Bradley
(Republic of Ireland) Jack Moylan

=== EFL League One Goal of the Month ===
| Month | Player | Goal | | Ref |
|---|---|---|---|---|
| December | (England) Adam Reach | 72' vs Barnsley, 29 December | Winner | |

=== EFL Trophy Player of the Round ===
| Round | Player | | Ref. |
|---|---|---|---|
| Group | (England) Zach Jeacock | Nomination | |
