= Tom Shaw (footballer) =

English footballer and manager

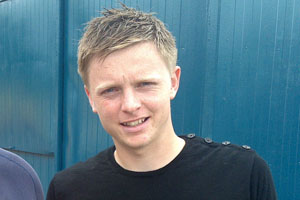
- Shaw in 2009

Personal information
- Full name: Thomas William Shaw
- Date of birth: 1 December 1986 (age 39)
- Place of birth: Nottingham, England
- Height: 6 ft 0 in (1.83 m)
- Position: Midfielder

Team information
- Current team: Lincoln City (joint head coach)

Youth career
- Nottingham Forest
- 2002–2006: Rushden & Diamonds

Senior career*
Years	Team	Apps	(Gls)
2006–2008	Rushden & Diamonds	53	(2)
2006	→ Rugby Town (loan)	1	(0)
2007	→ Nuneaton Borough (loan)	12	(0)
2008	Mansfield Town	0	(0)
2008–2010	Tamworth	62	(2)
2010–2011	Kidderminster Harriers	42	(5)
2011–2013	Cambridge United	79	(13)
2013–2015	Alfreton Town	83	(15)
2015–2018	Chester	97	(12)
2018	Tamworth	14	(1)
2018–2019	Lincoln City	0	(0)
Total		443	(50)

International career
2009	England C	2	(0)

Managerial career
- 2017: Chester (caretaker)
- 2021–2022: Gainsborough Trinity
- 2023: Lincoln City (caretaker)
- 2026–: Lincoln City (joint with Chris Cohen)
- * Club domestic league appearances and goals as of 12:50, 26 February 2019 (UTC)

Thomas William Shaw (born 1 December 1986) is an English former footballer and co-head coach at EFL Championship side Lincoln City with Chris Cohen.

Shaw began his career at Rushden & Diamonds, making over 50 appearances in the Football League and Conference between 2006 and 2008. He has since had spells at Mansfield Town, Tamworth, Kidderminster Harriers and Cambridge United, Alfreton Town, before moving to Chester in 2015. Shaw returned to Tamworth in 2018. In the summer of 2018, Shaw joined Lincoln City as the LeadProfessional Development Phase (PDP) Coach.

== Club career ==
Born in Nottingham, Nottinghamshire, Shaw began his career in the youth academy at Nottingham Forest before joining the youth team at Rushden & Diamonds in 2002. He joined Rugby Town on a work-experience loan in March 2006, was recalled by Rushden & Diamonds at the beginning of April, and made his debut for Rushden & Diamonds in the club's last game in the Football League against Barnet in May 2006. After Rushden & Diamonds were relegated from the Football League at the end of the 2005–06 season, he was retained by manager Paul Hart and signed full professional terms in July 2006.

By January 2007, Shaw had made 18 appearances for Rushden & Diamonds but was one of seven players placed on the transfer list by new manager Graham Westley and he joined Conference North side Nuneaton Borough on loan later in the same month. After returning from loan, he made some impressive performances until he suffered a foot injury in April 2007 that ruled him out for the remainder of the season. He signed a new two-year contract with Rushden & Diamonds in the summer of 2007.

Shaw made 35 appearances in the 2007–08 season but his contract was cancelled by mutual consent in July 2008 after both the club and Shaw felt that he would not have a regular place in the first team in the 2008–09 season.

On 8 August 2008, Shaw signed a one-year contract with Mansfield Town. Shaw joined Conference North side Tamworth on 9 October 2008. On 11 June 2010, Shaw signed a one-year deal at Kidderminster Harriers. On 14 May 2011, Shaw signed a two-year contract for Cambridge United, becoming their first signing of the summer under Jez George.

Shaw joined Alfreton Town on a two-year contract on 1 July 2013. He made his debut in Alfreton's opening day defeat to Dartford on 10 August and scored his first goal three days later in a 3–1 win over Kidderminster Harriers.

== International career ==
Shaw represented England C in victories over Malta under-21s and Poland under-23s in 2009.

== Coaching career ==
In 2014, Shaw was appointed Academy Lead Coach at Nottingham Forest. The following year, he joined Derby County in the same role. Shaw departed from Derby in September 2017.

Shaw served as Player/Assistant Manager at Chester from 2015 to 2018.

In June 2018, Shaw was appointed lead PDP Coach at Lincoln City. Upon his appointment, former Academy manager Damian Froggatt described Shaw as the "standout candidate".

In April 2021 Shaw was appointed head coach of Gainsborough Trinity, whilst retaining his role at Lincoln City. On 12 May 2022, Shaw resigned as Trinity manager.

On 27 June 2022, Shaw was promoted to the Lincoln City first team staff from the academy and would be mentored by incoming assistant head coach Mike Garrity. On 18 October 2023, he was made interim head coach following Mark Kennedy and Danny Butterfield both leaving the club. He remained in this role until 13 November 2023, overseeing three wins from seven matches, becoming assistant head coach following the arrival of Michael Skubala. He received his UEFA Pro Licence in June 2025 and a few months later he signed a new contract until the summer of 2029.

On 29 May 2026, Shaw became joint-head coach of Lincoln City with Chris Cohen, following the departure of Michael Skubala to Bristol City. Their first game was against Derby County in the EFL Cup, which would see them win 2–1. Their first league game was away to Middlesbrough which ended in a 1–2 defeat, Lincoln's first league loss since the 29 November 2025. Their first league win came against newly promoted Bolton Wanderers on 29 August, winning 1–0 thanks to a goal from Ben House. The pair received a nomination for the Championship Manager of the Month award for October after picking up 8 points from 5 games, including away wins at Preston North End and Bristol City.

== Career statistics ==
Appearances and goals by club, season and competition
Club	Season	League			FA Cup		League Cup		Other		Total	
Club	Season	Division	Apps	Goals	Apps	Goals	Apps	Goals	Apps	Goals	Apps	Goals
Rushden & Diamonds	2005–06	League Two	1	0	0	0	0	0	0	0	1	0
Rushden & Diamonds	2006–07	Conference National	20	0	3	2	—		0	0	23	2
Rushden & Diamonds	2007–08	Conference Premier	32	2	1	0	—		8 (Note: Five appearances and one goal in Conference League Cup, three appearances in FA Trophy)	1	41	3
Rushden & Diamonds	Total		53	2	4	2	—		8	1	65	5
Rugby Town (loan)	2005–06	SFL Premier Division	1	0	0	0	—		0	0	1	0
Nuneaton Borough (loan)	2006–07	Conference North	12	0	—		—		0	0	12	0
Mansfield Town	2008–09	Conference Premier	0	0	—		—		0	0	0	0
Tamworth	2008–09	Conference North	26	1	2	1	—		1 (Note: Appearance(s) in FA Trophy)	0	29	2
Tamworth	2009–10	Conference Premier	36	1	1	0	—		5	1	42	2
Tamworth	Total		62	2	3	1	—		6	1	71	4
Kidderminster Harriers	2010–11	Conference Premier	42	5	1	0	—		0	0	43	5
Cambridge United	2011–12	Conference Premier	42	7	3	0	—		4	0	49	7
Cambridge United	2012–13	Conference Premier	37	6	1	0	—		2	0	40	6
Cambridge United	Total		79	13	4	0	—		6	0	89	13
Alfreton Town	2013–14	Conference Premier	41	8	2	0	—		1	0	44	8
Alfreton Town	2014–15	Conference Premier	42	7	2	0	—		2	2	46	9
Alfreton Town	Total		83	15	4	0	—		3	2	90	17
Chester	2015–16	National League	41	4	1	0	—		3 (Note: Two appearances in FA Trophy, one appearance in Cheshire Senior Cup)	0	45	4
Chester	2016–17	National League	43	8	0	0	—		3	0	46	8
Chester	2017–18	National League	13	0	0	0	—		1	0	14	0
Chester	Total		97	12	1	0	—		9	0	105	12
Tamworth	2017–18	National League	14	1	0	0	—		0	0	14	1
Lincoln City	2018–19	League Two	0	0	0	0	—		1 (Note: Appearance(s) in Football League Trophy)	0	1	0
Career total			443	50	17	3	0	0	33	4	491	57

== Managerial statistics ==
As of 21 November 2026

Managerial record by team and tenure
Team	From	To	Record					Ref
Team	From	To	P	W	D	L	Win %	Ref
Chester (caretaker)	6 September 2017	20 September 2017	3	0	1	2	0.0	
Gainsborough Trinity	8 April 2021	12 May 2022	48	15	14	19	31.3	
Lincoln City (caretaker)	18 October 2023	13 November 2023	7	3	2	2	42.9	
Lincoln City (co-head coach)	29 May 2026	present	18	6	3	9	33.3	
Total			76	24	20	32	31.6	

== Honours ==
Tamworth

- Conference North: 2008–09
