= Chris Cohen (footballer) =

English footballer (born 1987)

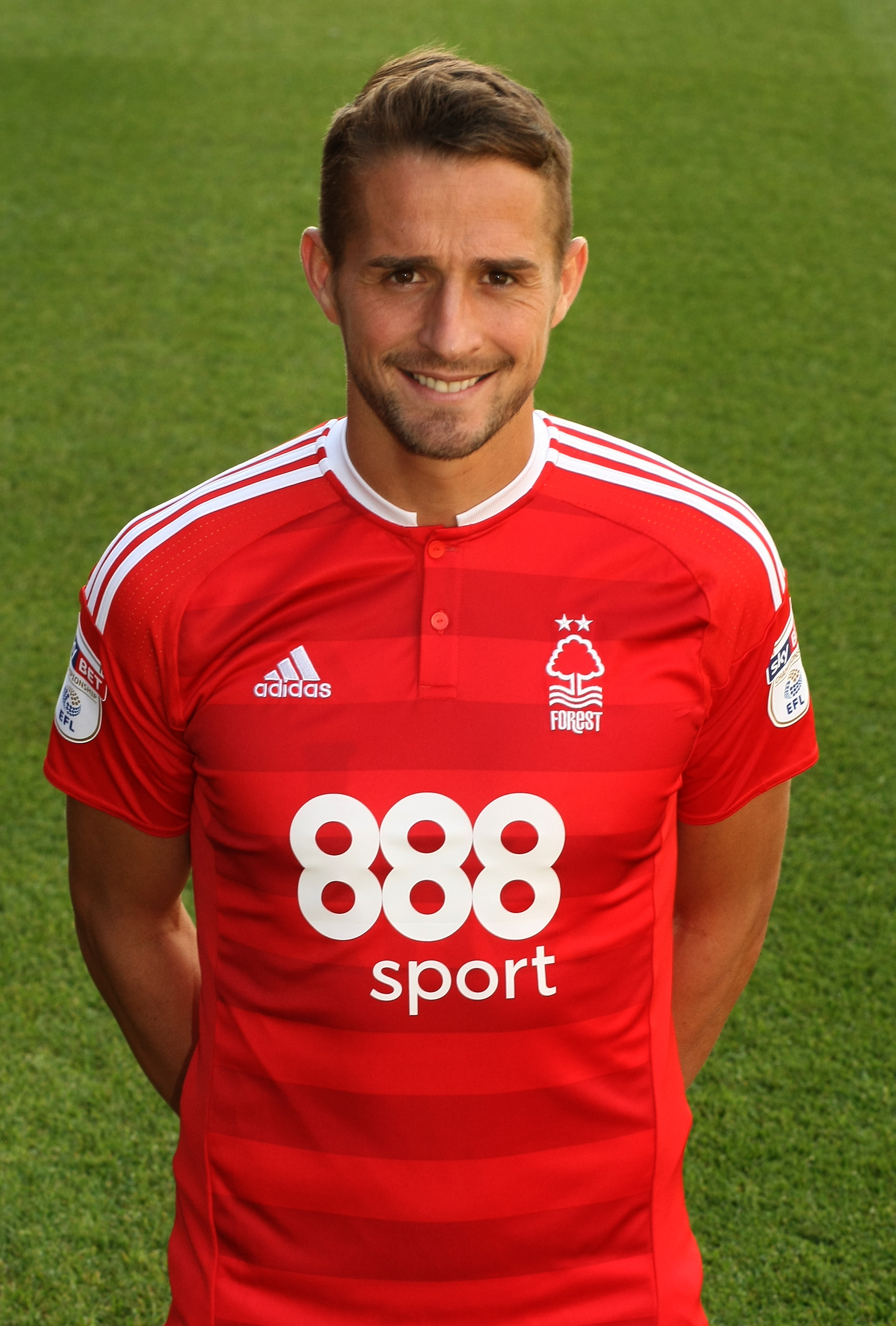
- Cohen with Nottingham Forest in 2016

Personal information
- Full name: Christopher David Cohen
- Date of birth: 5 March 1987 (age 39)
- Place of birth: Norwich, England
- Height: 1.80 m (5 ft 11 in)
- Position: Midfielder

Team information
- Current team: Lincoln City (joint head coach)

Youth career
- 1993–2003: West Ham United

Senior career*
Years	Team	Apps	(Gls)
2003–2006	West Ham United	18	(0)
2005–2006	→ Yeovil Town (loan)	30	(1)
2006–2007	Yeovil Town	44	(6)
2007–2018	Nottingham Forest	272	(14)
Total		364	(21)

International career
2003	England U16	3	(0)
2002–2003	England U17	5	(0)

Managerial career
- 2026–: Lincoln City (joint with Tom Shaw)
- * Club domestic league appearances and goals

Christopher David Cohen (born 5 March 1987) is an English former professional footballer and co-head coach at EFL Championship club Lincoln City with Tom Shaw.

Primarily a midfielder, he was able to operate equally in the centre or on the left, but was also employed at times as a left-back. During his time at Nottingham Forest, Cohen was known for his energetic and hard-working style of play and the consistency of his performances which won him multiple player of the season awards.

Cohen started his career with West Ham United in 2003. He joined Yeovil Town on loan from 2005 until 2006 and signed for the club permanently later in 2006, before moving to Nottingham Forest in summer 2007.

== Early years ==
Born in Norwich, Norfolk, Cohen went to William Edwards School and Sports College, Stifford Clays, Grays, Essex where he played alongside Max Porter in the school football team.

== Club career ==
=== West Ham United ===
Cohen was a product of the West Ham United youth system and he was scouted whilst playing for an amateur football club at the age of six. Cohen made his first breakthrough into the West Ham first team during the 2003–04 season. He made his debut as a 16-year-old, coming on as a substitute in West Ham's 3–2 win over Sunderland on 13 December 2003, which made him the youngest player to appear for the West Ham first-team for 80 years. He featured another six times that season and went on to make 14 league and cup appearances the following season.

=== Yeovil Town ===
As West Ham returned to the Premier League for the start of the 2005–06 season, Cohen found his first team chances limited. After a single League Cup appearance for the club in September, he joined League One side Yeovil Town on a one-month loan in November 2005. The deal was extended until the end of the season during the January transfer window. Cohen finished the season with 31 appearances and one goal for Yeovil. Cohen joined the club on a permanent basis on a two-year contract on 28 June 2006. Following Yeovil's exit from the FA Cup against Rushden and Diamonds, manager Russell Slade exempted Cohen from criticism, praising his performance. Slade said he would do everything in his power to keep Cohen at Yeovil, saying the club had received a bid from Nottingham Forest in January 2007. At the end of the 2006–07 season, he won two Player of the Year Awards from Yeovil Town. He made 81 league and cup appearances for Yeovil, scoring eight goals.

=== Nottingham Forest ===
In a combined £1.2 million deal with Yeovil teammate Arron Davies, Cohen moved to League One side Nottingham Forest on 6 July 2007, signing a four-year contract. He missed the start of the 2007–08 season due to injury but recovered and started in Forest's 2–0 win at Port Vale in October. He performed very well and contributed significantly to the opening goal and was praised by manager Colin Calderwood afterwards. He then hit a rich vein of form by helping Forest achieve an eight-game unbeaten run to put them into second spot in the league at Christmas 2007, including an influential display in the 3–0 win at Cheltenham Town. He finally got his first goal for the club, equalising just three minutes after coming off the bench in Forest's 2–1 victory over Huddersfield Town. Cohen was a virtual ever-present for Forest in his first season for the club, only missing the first five league games of the season, and helped the club gain automatic promotion to the Championship as League One runners-up.

In the 2008–09 season, Cohen continued to impress with consistent displays, and was picked out for praise by visiting Charlton manager Alan Pardew after a 0–0 draw, as being the best player on the pitch. He was voted Player of the Season at the end of the 2008–09 season. Manager Billy Davies said of Cohen, "He's a player with a wonderful attitude, can play in several positions, has tremendous energy and has got outstanding ability". In May 2009, Cohen was rewarded with a new four-year contract until 2013. In the first leg of the 2009–10 Championship play-off semi-final against Blackpool on 8 May 2010, Cohen put Forest ahead with a curling outside-foot volley at Bloomfield Road. Cohen was controversially sent off in an away fixture against Leeds United on 2 April 2011, following his challenge on George McCartney. Forest appealed against the decision, however the decision made by referee Mark Halsey was upheld.

"Leaving does not appeal to me, it never has. Players do sometimes do it and fair play to them. There is no right and wrong. But for me, it is about playing 500 or 600 games with the same club. That is something I hope I can achieve here. Look at how Wes is remembered for his time here. That is how I want to be remembered. Everyone has their own decisions to make. But I love it here. I love being in the city. So not to stay would not make any sense to me." – Cohen, on staying at Forest for as long as possible.

In an East Midlands derby match between Nottingham Forest and Derby County, Cohen suffered damage to his knee ligament. Scans suggested he would be out for a year. Cohen made his first start for Nottingham Forest since that horrific injury in the League Cup match on 28 August 2012. On 30 September, Cohen made his league return for Forest against Derby County. Cohen signed a new contract with Forest on 8 October, keeping him at the club until 2016. After signing, he stated that he plans on making over 500 appearances for the club.

Cohen was voted Player of the Season in the 2012–13 season by the Forest supporters. On the back of his performances and longevity with Nottingham Forest, the 26-year-old midfielder was made the club captain on 31 July 2013, succeeding Danny Collins. He made an immediate impact as captain, as he was an important part in Forest's first goal of the 2013–14 season, making a great run to the byline and pulling it back for Henri Lansbury to score against Huddersfield. Cohen was to suffer another lengthy spell out with injury, following a 1–1 draw with Burnley at the City Ground on 23 November 2013. Cohen limped off late in the game and it was subsequently confirmed that he had suffered cruciate ligament damage, which ruled him out for the rest of the season.

On 11 July 2014, then-Forest manager Stuart Pearce confirmed that Cohen would remain as captain under his management, stating that he was "everything you would want as a captain". Cohen started Forest's first six league games of the season under Pearce, but was taken off with an injury fifteen minutes into a league game against local rivals Derby County on 14 September 2014. Following assessment of the injury, Cohen was ruled out for nine months with his third serious knee injury in three years.

"It's been a crazy journey. We've come so close to the Premier League a couple of times and I've had to come back from injuries. The amount of support I've had from the club, the chairman especially, has made me desperate to stay ... I feel like I'm training really well, getting stronger every week and I'm waiting for my opportunity, after the boys have been doing so well, to get back into the team." – Cohen, on signing a one-year extension to his contract.

Having missed fifteen months of football, Cohen eventually made his return to the first team to "huge cheers" on 2 January 2016, when he replaced Jack Hobbs in the 86th minute of a 1–1 draw at Charlton Athletic. Cohen started Forest's next game at left-back; a home win in the FA Cup over Queens Park Rangers on 9 January. On 17 February, he signed a one-year extension to his contract, which had been due to expire in the summer of 2016. On 7 May 2016, Cohen made his 250th league appearance for Nottingham Forest and scored the opening goal of a 2–1 win away at MK Dons.

Cohen began the 2016–17 season well under the new management of Philippe Montanier, but missed Forest's 2–0 win over Ipswich Town at Portman Road on 19 November with an injury. It was subsequently confirmed that Cohen had sustained a groin injury in training that required surgery, and would be expected to keep him out of action for three months. Cohen returned from injury to play a pivotal role in Forest retaining their Championship status in the final game of the season. With Forest one of three clubs facing relegation, and needing to better the result of Blackburn Rovers at Brentford, Cohen scored the second goal of a 3–0 win over Ipswich Town with a deflected shot on goal from 25 yards. The game marked Cohen's 300th appearance for the club in all competitions and consigned Blackburn Rovers to relegation to League One. Five days later Forest announced that Cohen had signed a one-year extension to his contract with the club.

In January 2018, Cohen was appointed joint-manager of the Under-23 team.

Cohen announced his retirement from football at the end of 2017–18 season, after struggling with injury. He played his final game for Forest, coming on as an 89th-minute substitute, on 28 April 2018.

== International career ==
Cohen made three appearances for the England under-16 side in 2003, when he featured in the Tournoi de Montaigu. He made five appearances for the England under-17 side between 2002 and 2003, playing in the Nordic Cup.

== Coaching career ==
In September 2020, Cohen was appointed first-team coach at Championship club Luton Town, supporting former Yeovil teammate and Luton manager Nathan Jones. In July 2022, a change to the football management structure saw him promoted to the role of assistant manager.

On 10 November 2022, Cohen departed Luton Town to take on a first-team coach role at Premier League club Southampton, following Nathan Jones in the move. Following Jones' sacking in February 2023, the shortest non-caretaker manager spell in Southampton's history, Cohen departed the club.

In November 2023, Cohen joined League One side Lincoln City to assist Interim Head Coach Tom Shaw. His short term contract expired when the club appointed Michael Skubala as permanent Head Coach. On 13 January 2024, he returned to Lincoln in the role of assistant head coach.

On 14 June 2024, Cohen moved to Stoke City as assistant head coach to Steven Schumacher. He left Stoke in September 2024 following the sacking of Schumacher.

On 4 November 2024, he returned to Lincoln City's coaching staff for a third time as assistant head coach.

On 29 May 2026, Cohen became joint-head coach of Lincoln City with Tom Shaw, following the departure of Michael Skubala to Bristol City. Their first game was against Derby County in the EFL Cup, which would see them win 2–1. Their first league game was away to Middlesbrough which ended in a 1–2 defeat, Lincoln's first league loss since the 29 November 2025. Their first league win came against newly promoted Bolton Wanderers on 29 August, winning 1–0 thanks to a goal from Ben House. The pair received a nomination for the Championship Manager of the Month award for October after picking up 8 points from 5 games, including away wins at Preston North End and Bristol City.

== Career statistics ==
Appearances and goals by club, season and competition
Club	Season	League			FA Cup		League Cup		Other		Total	
Club	Season	Division	Apps	Goals	Apps	Goals	Apps	Goals	Apps	Goals	Apps	Goals
West Ham United	2003–04	First Division	7	0	0	0	0	0	0	0	7	0
West Ham United	2004–05	Championship	11	0	1	0	2	0	0	0	14	0
West Ham United	2005–06	Premier League	0	0	—		1	0	—		1	0
West Ham United	Total		18	0	1	0	3	0	0	0	22	0
Yeovil Town (loan)	2005–06	League One	30	1	1	0	—		—		31	1
Yeovil Town	2006–07	League One	44	6	1	1	1	0	4 (Note: One appearance in Football League Trophy, three in League One play-offs)	0	50	7
Yeovil Town	Total		74	7	2	1	1	0	4	0	81	8
Nottingham Forest	2007–08	League One	41	2	3	0	1	0	0	0	45	2
Nottingham Forest	2008–09	Championship	41	2	3	1	2	1	—		46	4
Nottingham Forest	2009–10	Championship	44	3	2	0	3	0	2 (Note: Appearances in Championship play-offs)	1	51	4
Nottingham Forest	2010–11	Championship	42	2	2	0	1	0	2	0	47	2
Nottingham Forest	2011–12	Championship	7	0	0	0	2	0	—		9	0
Nottingham Forest	2012–13	Championship	38	2	1	0	1	0	—		40	2
Nottingham Forest	2013–14	Championship	16	1	0	0	1	0	—		17	1
Nottingham Forest	2014–15	Championship	6	0	0	0	0	0	—		6	0
Nottingham Forest	2015–16	Championship	15	1	2	0	0	0	—		17	1
Nottingham Forest	2016–17	Championship	20	1	0	0	2	0	—		22	1
Nottingham Forest	2017–18	Championship	2	0	0	0	1	0	—		3	0
Nottingham Forest	Total		272	14	13	1	14	1	4	1	303	17
Career total			364	21	16	2	18	1	8	1	406	25

== Managerial statistics ==
As of 21 November 2026

Managerial record by team and tenure
Team	From	To	Record					Ref.
Team	From	To	P	W	D	L	Win %	Ref.
Lincoln City (co-head coach)	29 May 2026	present	18	6	3	9	33.3	
Total			18	6	3	9	33.3	

== Honours ==
Nottingham Forest

- League One runner-up: 2007–08

Individual

- Nottingham Forest Player of the Year: 2008–09, 2012–13
