= Ethan Hamilton =

Scottish footballer (born 1998)

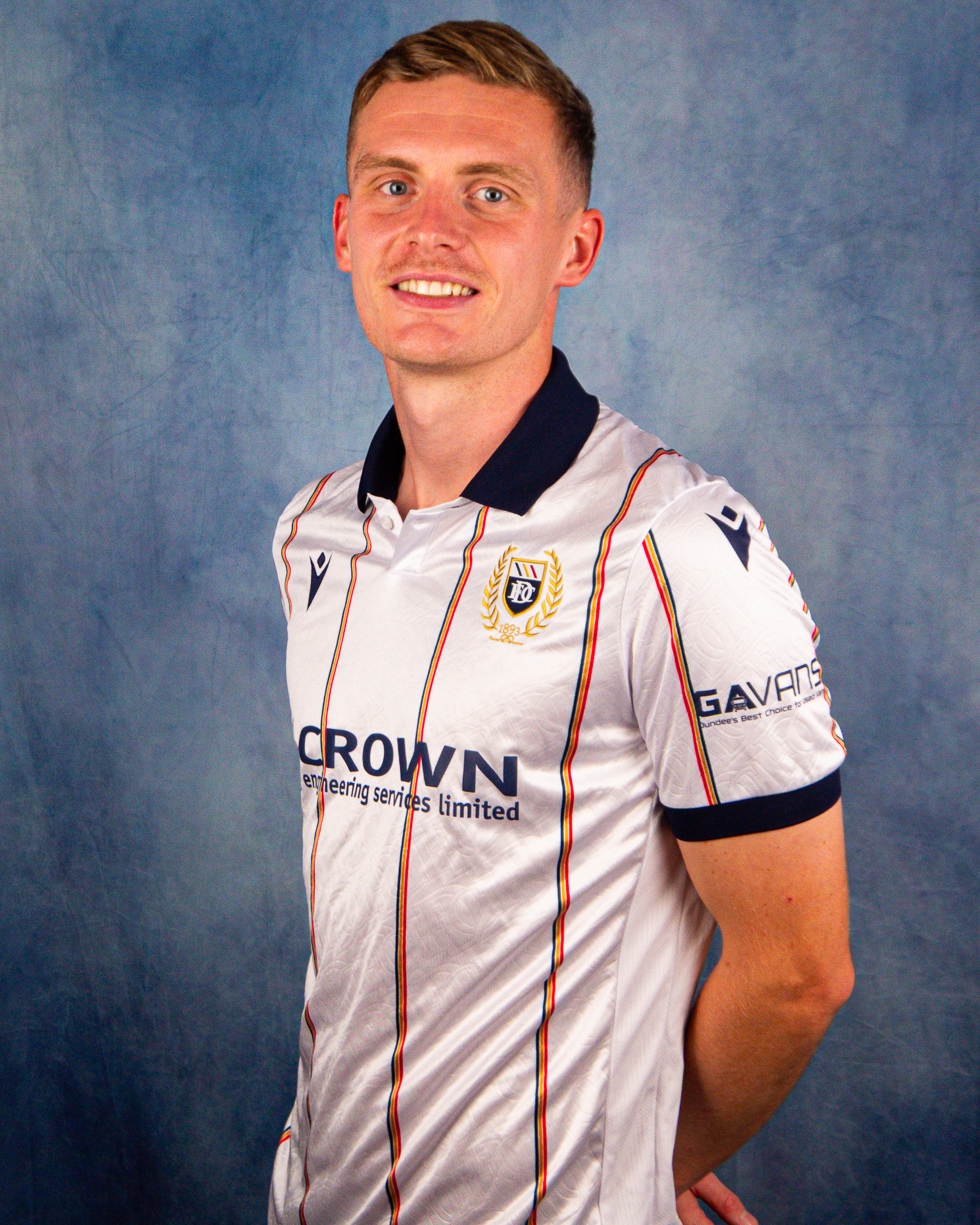
- Hamilton with Dundee in 2025

Personal information
- Full name: Ethan Billy Hamilton
- Date of birth: 18 October 1998 (age 28)
- Place of birth: Edinburgh, Scotland
- Height: 6 ft 2 in (1.87 m)
- Position: Midfielder

Team information
- Current team: Dundee
- Number: 48

Youth career
- –2015: Hutchison Vale
- 2015–2018: Manchester United

Senior career*
Years	Team	Apps	(Gls)
2018–2020	Manchester United	0	(0)
2019	→ Rochdale (loan)	14	(4)
2019–2020	→ Southend United (loan)	14	(0)
2020	→ Bolton Wanderers (loan)	12	(1)
2020–2021	Peterborough United	36	(0)
2021–2023	Accrington Stanley	74	(10)
2023–2025	Lincoln City	67	(3)
2025–	Dundee	46	(1)

International career
2013	Scotland U15	3	(0)
2013	Scotland U16	1	(0)
2017	Scotland U19	3	(0)
- * Club domestic league appearances and goals as of 22:04, 21 November 2026 (UTC)

Ethan Billy Hamilton (born 18 October 1998) is a Scottish professional footballer who plays as a midfielder for Scottish Premiership club Dundee.

== Club career ==
Hamilton began his career with Edinburgh-based club Hutchison Vale, the same club that Darren Fletcher (who also later played for Manchester United) began his career at.

Hamilton played several matches for Manchester United's under-18s team during the 2014–15 season, before signing for the club as an academy scholar in July 2015, when he was 16 years old. Hamilton was a regular for the Manchester United Under-18s in the first half of the 2015–16 season, but did not play at all in the second half of the season. He returned to the team for the 2016–17 season, when, despite not finding the back of the net until December, he finished as the team's third-highest goalscorer, with 8 goals in 23 appearances; he also played eight times for the club's reserve team that season, before making the regular step up for the 2017–18 season. He made 22 appearances for the reserves that season, his performances earning him a call-up to the first team in February 2018, after Paul Pogba was ruled out of the club's FA Cup fifth round tie against Huddersfield Town; Hamilton was assigned the number 48 shirt and named as a substitute, but did not play in the game. At the end of the season, Hamilton was nominated alongside Demetri Mitchell and Kieran O'Hara for the Denzil Haroun Reserve Team Player of the Year award, given to Manchester United's best reserve team player of the season; the award was ultimately won by Mitchell.

Ahead of the 2018–19 season, Hamilton signed his first professional contract with Manchester United, before being named as part of the squad for the club's pre-season tour of the United States. He made one appearance on the tour, coming on as an 89th-minute substitute for Juan Mata in a game against Milan on 26 July. The match finished 1–1 after 90 minutes and went straight to penalties; with the score at 6–6 after nine kicks each, Hamilton saw his penalty saved by Pepe Reina, only for José Mauri to also miss. United went on to win the shoot-out 9–8 after 13 kicks each. Hamilton made 14 appearances for the Manchester United reserves in the first half of the 2018–19 season, before moving on loan to Rochdale in January 2019.

For the 2019–20 season, Hamilton joined League One club Southend United on loan. He scored his first goal for Southend when he scored in an EFL Trophy tie against AFC Wimbledon on 13 November 2019. His spell with Southend came to an end when he was recalled by Manchester United on 3 January 2020.

Three days later, Hamilton joined League One club Bolton Wanderers on another loan for the remainder of the season.

He was released by Manchester United at the end of the 2019–20 season. He signed for Peterborough United in August 2020. He scored his first and only goal for Peterborough in an EFL Trophy tie against Portsmouth on 12 January 2021.

On 31 August 2021, Hamilton joined Accrington Stanley on a two-year deal. He made his Accrington debut on 4 September, appearing as a substitute alongside Jovan Malcolm, also making his debut.

On 1 August 2023, Hamilton joined Lincoln City for an undisclosed fee, signing a three-year contract. On 5 August 2023, he made his Lincoln City debut starting against Bolton Wanderers. His first Lincoln goal was the winner in a 1–0 victory against Shrewsbury Town on 19 August 2023. On 29 February, manager Michael Skubala confirmed that Hamilton would be out for the season following a knee injury. He returned to the side on 5 October 2024 following his long term injury, coming off the bench against Leyton Orient.

On 26 August 2025, Hamilton joined Scottish Premiership club Dundee on a three-year deal from Lincoln City for an undisclosed fee.

== International career ==
Hamilton first played for Scotland at under-15 level, appearing in friendly matches against Germany, Italy and Russia in March 2013. He also made a single appearance for the Scotland U16 side in August that year, playing the first 40 minutes of a match against Cyprus. In 2017, he was selected to play for the Scotland U19 side in their UEFA European Under-19 Championship elite round qualifying matches against Austria, the Czech Republic and Hungary.

== Career statistics ==
As of match played 21 November 2026

Appearances and goals by club, season and competition
Club	Season	League			Domestic Cup		League Cup		Other		Total	
Club	Season	Division	Apps	Goals	Apps	Goals	Apps	Goals	Apps	Goals	Apps	Goals
Manchester United	2018–19	Premier League	0	0	0	0	0	0	0	0	0	0
Manchester United	2019–20	Premier League	0	0	0	0	0	0	0	0	0	0
Manchester United	Total		0	0	0	0	0	0	0	0	0	0
Rochdale (loan)	2018–19	League One	14	4	0	0	0	0	0	0	14	4
Southend United (loan)	2019–20	League One	14	0	1	0	1	0	2 (Note: Appearance(s) in the EFL Trophy.)	1	18	1
Bolton Wanderers (loan)	2019–20	League One	12	1	0	0	0	0	0	0	12	1
Peterborough United	2020–21	League One	34	0	1	0	1	0	6	1	42	1
Peterborough United	2021–22	Championship	2	0	0	0	1	0	0	0	3	0
Peterborough United	Total		36	0	1	0	2	0	6	1	45	1
Accrington Stanley	2021–22	League One	41	6	1	1	0	0	2	1	44	8
Accrington Stanley	2022–23	League One	33	4	5	2	0	0	5	0	43	6
Accrington Stanley	Total		74	10	6	3	0	0	7	1	87	14
Lincoln City	2023–24	League One	30	3	1	0	3	0	3	0	37	3
Lincoln City	2024–25	League One	32	0	3	0	0	0	4	0	39	0
Lincoln City	2025–26	League One	5	0	0	0	1	0	0	0	6	0
Lincoln City	Total		67	3	4	0	4	0	7	0	82	3
Dundee	2025–26	Scottish Premiership	33	1	2	1	0	0	0	0	35	2
Dundee	2026–27	Scottish Premiership	13	0	0	0	5	1	0	0	18	1
Dundee	Total		46	1	2	1	5	1	0	0	53	3
Career total			263	19	14	4	12	1	22	3	311	27
