= George Wickens (English footballer) =

English football player (born 2001)

Personal information
- Full name: George Alexander Wickens
- Date of birth: 8 November 2001 (age 25)
- Place of birth: Petersfield, England
- Height: 1.95 m (6 ft 5 in)
- Position: Goalkeeper

Team information
- Current team: Lincoln City
- Number: 1

Youth career
- –2024: Fulham

Senior career*
Years	Team	Apps	(Gls)
2021–2024	Fulham	0	(0)
2021–2022	→ Wealdstone (loan)	40	(0)
2024	→ Ross County (loan)	13	(0)
2024–	Lincoln City	98	(0)

International career
2019	England U18	1	(0)
- * Club domestic league appearances and goals as of 16:58, 21 November 2026 (UTC)

George Alexander Wickens (born 8 November 2001) is an English footballer who plays as a goalkeeper for EFL Championship club Lincoln City. He is an England youth international.

== Career ==
From Petersfield, Wickens spent the 2021–22 season on loan at Wealdstone where he made forty appearances. In January 2024, he signed for Scottish club Ross County on loan. Whilst on loan he made a double penalty save away against Celtic at Parkhead in January 2024. He was offered a new contract by Fulham at the end of the 2023–24 season.

On 20 July 2024, Wickens joined League One side Lincoln City on a four-year deal. He made his Lincoln City debut on 10 August, in a 3–2 win against Burton Albion.

After winning promotion from League One in the 2025–26 season, he was named in the EFL League One Team of the Season alongside teammates, Tendayi Darikwa, Sonny Bradley and Jack Moylan. He finished the season winning the League One Golden Glove, joint with Filip Marschall, keeping 19 clean sheets, as well as getting four assists, equaling Ederson's record for most assists by a goalkeeper in an English football season. Ahead of the 2026–27 season, he signed a three-year contract with Lincoln City, with a club option of a further year.

== International career ==
Wickens has represented England at under-18 level.

== Career statistics ==
As of 21 November 2026

Appearances and goals by club, season and competition
Club	Season	League			National cup (Note: Includes FA Cup, Scottish Cup)		League cup		Other		Total	
Club	Season	Division	Apps	Goals	Apps	Goals	Apps	Goals	Apps	Goals	Apps	Goals
Fulham	2018–19	Premier League	0	0	0	0	0	0	1 (Note: Appearance(s) in Football League Trophy)	0	1	0
Fulham	2019–20	Championship	0	0	0	0	0	0	0	0	0	0
Fulham	2020–21	Premier League	0	0	0	0	0	0	2	0	2	0
Fulham	2021–22	Championship	0	0	0	0	0	0	0	0	0	0
Fulham	2022–23	Premier League	0	0	0	0	0	0	0	0	0	0
Fulham	2023–24	Premier League	0	0	0	0	0	0	0	0	0	0
Fulham	Total		0	0	0	0	0	0	3	0	3	0
Wealdstone (loan)	2021–22	National League	40	0	1	0	—		0	0	41	0
Ross County (loan)	2023–24	Scottish Premiership	13	0	1	0	—		0	0	14	0
Lincoln City	2024–25	League One	36	0	2	0	0	0	1	0	39	0
Lincoln City	2025–26	League One	46	0	1	0	0	0	0	0	47	0
Lincoln City	2026–27	Championship	16	0	0	0	1	0	—		17	0
Lincoln City	Total		98	0	3	0	1	0	1	0	103	0
Career total			151	0	5	0	1	0	4	0	161	0

== Honours ==
Lincoln City

- EFL League One: 2025–26

Individual

- EFL League One Team of the Season: 2025–26
- EFL League One Golden Glove: 2025–26
- PFA Team of the Year: 2025–26 League One
