= Jack Moylan =

Irish footballer (born 2001)

Personal information
- Full name: Jack Moylan
- Date of birth: 1 September 2001 (age 25)
- Place of birth: Dublin, Ireland
- Height: 1.86 m (6 ft 1 in)
- Positions: Attacking midfielder; striker

Team information
- Current team: Cardiff City
- Number: 8

Youth career
- –2017: Malahide United
- 2017–2020: Bohemians

Senior career*
Years	Team	Apps	(Gls)
2020–2021	Bohemians	6	(0)
2021	→ Wexford (loan)	14	(7)
2022–2023	Shelbourne	63	(22)
2024–2026	Lincoln City	77	(17)
2026–	Cardiff City	16	(10)

International career^{‡}
2026–	Republic of Ireland	8	(5)
- * Club domestic league appearances and goals as of 14:34, 21 November 2026 (UTC) ‡ National team caps and goals as of 23:26, 17 November 2026 (UTC)

Jack Moylan (born 1 September 2001) is an Irish professional footballer who plays as an attacking midfielder or left winger for EFL Championship club Cardiff City and the Republic of Ireland national team.

== Early life ==
Jack Moylan was born on 1 September 2001 to Senan Moylan and Brenda Harrington. A native of Bayside, Moylan played his youth football with Malahide United before signing for the Bohemians academy in March 2017. His manager at the time, Keith Long, later revealed that Moylan was his "very first signing for the Bohemians Academy".

== Club career ==
=== Bohemians ===
Moylan's route through the Bohemians academy saw him win back-to-back Under-19 National League titles in 2018 and 2019, in addition to winning the Enda McGuill Cup in 2018. He was also exposed to underage European football in the 2018–19 season against Midtjylland of Denmark. The following season, he scored in the UEFA Youth League first round 1–1 draw between Bohemians and PAOK at Dalymount Park. He made his first team league debut for Bohs on 24 October 2020 in a 2–0 defeat to Finn Harps.

==== Wexford loan ====
On 1 July 2021, Moylan was sent on loan to Wexford FC, where he stayed for the rest of the season. He scored eight goals in 17 appearances. His first appearance came in a 4–4 draw with Athlone Town.

=== Shelbourne ===
On 1 January 2022, Moylan signed for Shelbourne as an attacking midfielder and a striker. On 13 May 2023, Moylan scored the first hat-trick of his career in a 3–0 win against Sligo Rovers. His goals came in the ninth and 41st minutes, with a penalty in the 66th minute. He was named League of Ireland Player of the Month for October 2023, his last month with the club, having scored five goals in his final two games to take him up to 15 league goals for the season, the joint most in the league along with Jonathan Afolabi. At the end of the season he was named in the PFAI Team of the Year as voted by his fellow professionals in the league.

=== Lincoln City ===
On 4 September 2023, it was announced that Moylan had signed a pre-contract agreement with EFL League One side Lincoln City, with the contract effective from 1 January 2024. On 13 January 2024, he made his debut coming off the bench in the 1–1 draw against Wycombe Wanderers. His first goals for Lincoln came against Barnsley on 9 March 2024 where he netted a brace, the first of which was nominated for EFL League One Goal of the Month. The following year, Moylan made his 50th appearance for the Imps. At the start of the next season, he injured his ankle against Harrogate Town in August 2025 and was ruled out of action for three months after surgery. After returning to the squad, he was nominated for the January 2026 Player of the Month award when his four goals helped drive Lincoln's promotion push. On 13 March 2026, Moylan signed a three-year extension to his Lincoln City deal, which would keep him at the club until the summer of 2030. After winning promotion from League One in the 2025–26 season, he was named in the EFL League One Team of the Season alongside teammates Tendayi Darikwa, Sonny Bradley and George Wickens. Moylan was also nominated for EFL League One Player of the Season, alongside teammates Sonny Bradley, Dom Ballard and Owen Bailey. At the end of the season he was nominated for the League One PFA Players’ Player of the Year.

=== Cardiff City ===
On 5 August 2026, Moylan signed a four-year contract at EFL Championship club Cardiff City for an undisclosed fee, a club record fee received for Lincoln City.

== International career ==
In May 2026, he received his first call up to the Republic of Ireland squad for their friendly against Grenada on 16 May 2026. He made his debut in the game, scoring a second half hat-trick in a 5–0 win, becoming the first Ireland player to score a debut hat-trick in 39 years. On 28 May 2026, Moylan was sent-off for a studs-up challenge in his second match for the Republic of Ireland against Qatar.

== Career statistics ==
=== Club ===
As of match played on 21 November 2026

Appearances and goals by club, season and competition
Club	Season	League			National cup (Note: Includes FAI Cup, FA Cup)		League cup (Note: Includes EFL Cup)		Other		Total	
Club	Season	Division	Apps	Goals	Apps	Goals	Apps	Goals	Apps	Goals	Apps	Goals
Bohemians	2019	LOI Premier Division	0	0	0	0	0	0	1 (Note: Appearances in Leinster Senior Cup)	0	1	0
Bohemians	2020	LOI Premier Division	2	0	1	0	—		0	0	3	0
Bohemians	2021	LOI Premier Division	4	0	—		—		0	0	4	0
Bohemians	Total		6	0	1	0	0	0	1	0	8	0
Wexford (loan)	2021	LOI First Division	14	7	3	1	—		—		17	8
Shelbourne	2022	LOI Premier Division	27	7	5	3	—		—		32	10
Shelbourne	2023	LOI Premier Division	36	15	1	0	—		1	1	38	16
Shelbourne	Total		63	22	6	3	—		1	1	70	26
Lincoln City	2023–24	League One	18	4	—		—		—		18	4
Lincoln City	2024–25	League One	28	2	3	2	1	0	3 (Note: Appearance(s) in EFL Trophy)	1	35	5
Lincoln City	2025–26	League One	31	11	0	0	1	1	2	0	34	12
Lincoln City	Total		77	17	3	2	2	1	5	1	87	21
Cardiff City	2026–27	Championship	16	10	0	0	2	1	—		18	11
Career total			177	58	13	6	4	2	7	2	200	66

=== International ===
As of match played on 17 November 2026

Appearances and goals by national team and year
National team	Year	Apps	Goals
Republic of Ireland
Republic of Ireland	2026	8	5
Total		8	5

List of international goals scored by Jack Moylan
No.	Date	Venue	Opponent	Score	Result	Competition
1	16 May 2026	Estadio Nueva Condomina, Murcia, Spain	Grenada	3–0	5–0	Friendly
2	16 May 2026	Estadio Nueva Condomina, Murcia, Spain	Grenada	4–0	5–0	Friendly
3	16 May 2026	Estadio Nueva Condomina, Murcia, Spain	Grenada	5–0	5–0	Friendly
4	27 September 2026	Nagyerdei Stadion, Debrecen, Hungary	Israel	3–0	3–0	2026–27 UEFA Nations League B
5	17 November 2026	Aviva Stadium, Dublin, Ireland	Kosovo	3–0	3–0	2026–27 UEFA Nations League B

== Honours ==
Lincoln City

- EFL League One: 2025–26

Individual

- League of Ireland Premier Division Top Goalscorer: 2023 (15 goals)
- PFAI Team of the Year: 2023
- League of Ireland Player of the Month: October 2023
- EFL League One Team of the Season: 2025–26
- PFA Team of the Year: 2025–26 League One
