= Rob Street =

English footballer (born 2001)

Personal information
- Full name: Robert Nicholas Street
- Date of birth: 26 September 2001 (age 25)
- Place of birth: Oxford, England
- Height: 6 ft 2 in (1.89 m)
- Position: Striker

Team information
- Current team: Lincoln City
- Number: 17

Youth career
- Crystal Palace
- Whyteleafe
- –2020: Crystal Palace

Senior career*
Years	Team	Apps	(Gls)
2020–2023	Crystal Palace	0	(0)
2021	→ Torquay United (loan)	5	(0)
2022	→ Newport County (loan)	18	(2)
2022–2023	→ Shrewsbury Town (loan)	38	(4)
2023–2024	Cheltenham Town	22	(2)
2024–	Lincoln City	67	(11)
2025	→ Doncaster Rovers (loan)	22	(12)
- * Club domestic league appearances and goals as of 17:02, 21 November 2026 (UTC)

Robert Nicholas Street (born 26 September 2001) is an English professional footballer who plays as a striker for EFL Championship club Lincoln City.

Street began his career with Crystal Palace, signing his first professional contract with them in 2020. He spent time on loan at Torquay United, Newport County and Shrewsbury Town, before signing for Cheltenham Town on a free transfer in 2023. A year later he joined Lincoln City, and later he went on loan to Doncaster Rovers with whom he won League Two.

== Career ==
=== Crystal Palace ===
Born in Oxford, Street began his career with Crystal Palace. He was released at the age of eight, and proceeded to represent his county Surrey and play for the Whyteleafe under-15s. He returned to Crystal Palace after a successful trial. He quickly moved up the youth ranks, being promoted to the under-23 squad at age 16. He turned professional in the summer of 2020.

Street joined Torquay United on loan in January 2021. He made his Torquay debut on 26 January in a 0–0 draw against Sutton United. However, he struggled for gametime, and returned to Crystal Palace in March following 5 appearances without scoring.

Despite suffering an injury in November 2021 in the EFL Trophy, Street scored 6 goals in 14 games for the Crystal Palace under-21s. In January 2022, Street was then loaned to Newport County for the remainder of the 2021–22 season. He made his debut for Newport on 29 January as a second-half substitute in the 2–1 League Two win against Barrow. His first start came on 26 February in a 4–2 win over Tranmere Rovers. Street scored his first goal for Newport (and his first senior goal) in the 2–0 League Two win against Stevenage on 12 March. He ended his loan spell with 2 goals in 18 appearances.

Street joined Shrewsbury Town on a season-long loan in September 2022. He made his debut on 3 September in a 2–0 win over Forest Green Rovers. He made his full debut on 13 September in a 3–2 victory over Exeter City. He scored his first goal on 10 December in a 3–2 win against Bolton Wanderers. He finished his loan with 4 goals in 43 appearances. He later praised Shrewsbury manager Steve Cotterill, saying, "He was absolutely brilliant for me and one of the best managers I've ever experienced."

=== Cheltenham Town ===
In the summer of 2023, Street was offered a new contract by Crystal Palace. However, he rejected the offer as he did not want to go back out on loan, and was released by the club. On 30 June 2023, Street joined League One side Cheltenham Town on a free transfer, signing a three-year contract. He made his debut on 5 August in a 1–0 defeat against former club Shrewsbury. He scored his first goal for Cheltenham on 7 October, in a 1–1 draw against Derby County. He suffered a knee injury in January 2024 in a match against Derby County, leaving him out for the rest of the season. He finished the season with 3 goals in 26 appearances, as the club was relegated to League Two.

=== Lincoln City ===
On 2 July 2024, Street signed for Lincoln City on a four-year deal for an undisclosed fee. He made his debut on 10 August in a 3–2 win over Burton Albion. His first goal came in a 5–0 win in the EFL Trophy against Manchester City U21 on 13 November. He only made 6 league appearances before going out on loan in 2025.

On 3 January 2025, Street signed on loan with Doncaster Rovers for the remainder of the season. He scored on his debut for the club in a 2–1 defeat to Port Vale on 4 January. Street scored 12 goals for Doncaster during his loan and earned both promotion and the EFL League Two title.

The following season, he returned to Lincoln City, starting the opening day of the 2025–26 season against Reading, where his deflected shot went in off Finley Burns for the opening goal. He scored his first goal on his return against Harrogate Town, scoring the third in a 3–1 victory in the EFL Cup. His first league goal for Lincoln City came in the 1–0 win against Stevenage in October 2025. Following the conclusion of the 2025–26 season, Street signed a new four-year contract to keep him at Lincoln until 2030.

== Career statistics ==
As of 21 November 2026

Appearances and goals by club, season and competition
Club	Season	League			FA Cup		League Cup		Other		Total	
Club	Season	Division	Apps	Goals	Apps	Goals	Apps	Goals	Apps	Goals	Apps	Goals
Crystal Palace U21	2021–22	—			—		—		3 (Note: Appearance(s) in EFL Trophy)	1	3	1
Crystal Palace	2020–21	Premier League	0	0	0	0	0	0	0	0	0	0
Crystal Palace	2021–22	Premier League	0	0	0	0	0	0	0	0	0	0
Crystal Palace	2022–23	Premier League	0	0	0	0	0	0	0	0	0	0
Crystal Palace	Total		0	0	0	0	0	0	0	0	0	0
Torquay United (loan)	2020–21	National League	5	0	0	0	0	0	0	0	5	0
Newport County (loan)	2021–22	League Two	18	2	0	0	0	0	0	0	18	2
Shrewsbury Town (loan)	2022–23	League One	38	4	3	0	0	0	2	0	43	4
Cheltenham Town	2023–24	League One	22	2	1	1	1	0	2	0	26	3
Lincoln City	2024–25	League One	6	0	0	0	1	0	4	1	11	1
Lincoln City	2025–26	League One	45	10	1	0	3	2	4	0	53	12
Lincoln City	2026–27	Championship	16	1	0	0	3	1	—		19	2
Lincoln City	Total		67	11	1	0	7	3	8	1	83	15
Doncaster Rovers (loan)	2024–25	League Two	23	12	2	0	0	0	0	0	25	12
Career total			173	31	7	1	8	3	15	2	203	37

== Honours ==
Doncaster Rovers

- EFL League Two: 2024–25

Lincoln City

- EFL League One: 2025–26
