= Noah Simmons =

Welsh footballer

Personal information
- Full name: Noah Christopher Francis Simmons
- Height: 5 ft 10 in (1.78 m)
- Position: Left back

Team information
- Current team: Long Eaton United

Youth career
- –2025: Lincoln City

Senior career*
Years	Team	Apps	(Gls)
2025–2026	Lincoln City	0	(0)
2025–2026	→ Loughborough Students (loan)	2	(0)
2026	→ Skegness Town (loan)	6	(0)
2026	→ Lincoln United (loan)	4	(0)
2026	Ilkeston Town	2	(0)
2026–	Long Eaton United	6	(0)
- * Club domestic league appearances and goals as of 17:13, 21 November 2026 (UTC)

Noah Christopher Francis Simmons is a Welsh professional footballer who plays as a left back for Northern Premier League Division One Midlandsclub Long Eaton United.

== Club career ==
=== Lincoln City ===
Simmons started with Lincoln City at U12 level and has risen through the ranks, playing anywhere on the left side of defence. On 12 August 2025, Simmons made his professional debut in the EFL Cup against Harrogate Town, replacing Tendayi Darikwa on the 83rd minute in a 3–1 victory.

==== Loans ====
On 19 December 2025, he joined Loughborough Students on a work experience loan. On 24 January 2026, he joined Skegness Town on a youth loan, appearing for them days later in a 1–4 defeat. On 28 March 2026, Simmons moved to Lincoln United on a youth loan.

=== None-league ===
On 3 August 2026, Simmons joined Ilkeston Town. On 23 October 2026, Simmons joined Long Eaton United.

== Career statistics ==
As of 21 November 2026

Club	Season	League			FA Cup		EFL Cup		Other		Total	
Club	Season	Division	Apps	Goals	Apps	Goals	Apps	Goals	Apps	Goals	Apps	Goals
Lincoln City	2025–26	League One	0	0	0	0	1	0	0	0	1	0
Loughborough Students (loan)	2025–26	NPL Division One Midlands	2	0	0	0	0	0	0	0	2	0
Skegness Town (loan)	2025–26	UCL Premier Division North	6	0	0	0	0	0	0	0	6	0
Lincoln United (loan)	2025–26	NPL Division One East	4	0	0	0	0	0	0	0	4	0
Ilkeston Town	2026–27	NPL Premier Division	2	0	0	0	0	0	0	0	2	0
Long Eaton United	2026–27	NPL Division One Midlands	6	0	0	0	0	0	0	0	6	0
Career total			20	0	0	0	1	0	0	0	21	0
