= Tom Hamer =

English footballer (born 1999)

Personal information
- Full name: Thomas Philip Hamer
- Date of birth: 1 October 1999 (age 27)
- Place of birth: Bolton, England
- Height: 6 ft 2 in (1.87 m)
- Positions: Right back; centre back

Team information
- Current team: Lincoln City
- Number: 22

Youth career
- 2015–2017: Oldham Athletic

Senior career*
Years	Team	Apps	(Gls)
2017–2021	Oldham Athletic	84	(6)
2021–2024	Burton Albion	128	(8)
2024–	Lincoln City	74	(4)
- * Club domestic league appearances and goals as of 17:03, 21 November 2026 (UTC)

Thomas Philip Hamer (born 1 October 1999) is an English professional footballer who plays as a right back or centre back for EFL Championship side Lincoln City.

== Early life ==
Hamer was born in Bolton, Greater Manchester.

== Career ==
Hamer started his career with Oldham Athletic's youth academy in 2015. He made his first-team debut for Oldham on 17 January 2018 when he played the first 69 minutes of the 4–2 victory over Leicester City U23 in the EFL Trophy. Six days later, in the same competition, he played 57 minutes of a 2–1 away defeat to Shrewsbury Town. He was an unused substitute for games against Rotherham United and Plymouth Argyle. Hamer made his league debut in League One in April, playing at centre back after Kean Bryan limped off 18 minutes into the game against Oxford United. He made his full league debut against local rivals Rochdale on 17 April 2018.

On 24 April 2018, Hamer signed a two-year professional contract at Oldham; the same day he also received the Man of the Match award in a 3–0 defeat against Southend United. He scored his first goal for the club during a 2–2 draw with Northampton Town on 5 May, when he headed in a Jack Byrne cross on the 55th minute.

On 29 January 2021, Hamer joined League One side Burton Albion for an undisclosed fee.

Hamer was ruled out for six months after damaging his achilles tendon against Cheltenham Town in April 2024.

On 19 July 2024, Hamer joined Lincoln City for an undisclosed fee, signing a three-year deal. He made his debut in the 2–1 defeat in the EFL Cup to Harrogate Town on 13 August 2024. He scored his first goal for Lincoln on 1 October 2024, scoring a 95th minute equaliser against Blackpool heading in from a corner. In March 2026, Hamer extended his contract until the summer of 2029.

== Style of play ==
Hamer plays mostly as a right back but can also play as a centre back; his former manager Richie Wellens also said he can play defensive midfield. He became known for his long throw-ins when both of Athletic's goals in a 2–2 draw with AFC Wimbledon were the result of his thrown-ins.

== Career statistics ==
As of 21 November 2026

Appearances and goals by club, season and competition
Club	Season	League			FA Cup		EFL Cup		Other		Total	
Club	Season	Division	Apps	Goals	Apps	Goals	Apps	Goals	Apps	Goals	Apps	Goals
Oldham Athletic	2017–18	League One	7	1	0	0	0	0	2 (Note: Appearance(s) in the Football League Trophy)	0	9	1
Oldham Athletic	2018–19	League Two	28	2	2	0	1	0	4	0	35	2
Oldham Athletic	2019–20	League Two	37	3	2	0	1	0	3	0	43	3
Oldham Athletic	2020–21	League Two	12	0	1	0	2	0	3	0	18	0
Oldham Athletic	Total		84	6	5	0	4	0	12	0	105	6
Burton Albion	2020–21	League One	21	3	0	0	0	0	0	0	21	3
Burton Albion	2021–22	League One	46	1	2	0	1	0	2	0	50	1
Burton Albion	2022–23	League One	35	3	3	0	1	0	5	0	44	3
Burton Albion	2023–24	League One	27	1	2	0	0	0	3	1	32	2
Burton Albion	Total		128	8	7	0	2	0	10	1	147	9
Lincoln City	2024–25	League One	23	2	0	0	1	0	2	0	26	2
Lincoln City	2025–26	League One	44	2	0	0	3	0	3	1	50	3
Lincoln City	2026–27	Championship	7	0	0	0	1	0	–		8	0
Lincoln City	Total		74	4	0	0	5	0	5	1	84	5
Career total			276	18	12	0	11	0	27	2	336	20

== Honours ==
Lincoln City

- EFL League One: 2025–26
