= Ryan Oné =

Scottish footballer

Personal information
- Full name: Ryan Martin Oné
- Date of birth: 26 June 2006 (age 20)
- Place of birth: Coatbridge, North Lanarkshire, Scotland
- Position: Forward

Team information
- Current team: Sheffield United
- Number: 26

Youth career
- Hamilton Academical

Senior career*
Years	Team	Apps	(Gls)
2022–2023	Hamilton Academical	21	(2)
2023–	Sheffield United	22	(1)
2026	→ Lincoln City (loan)	16	(5)

International career^{‡}
2023–	Scotland U17	2	(0)
2023–	Scotland U19	6	(1)
2025–	Scotland U21	4	(1)
- * Club domestic league appearances and goals as of 16:11, 17 October 2026 (UTC) ‡ National team caps and goals as of 14:09, 1 April 2026 (UTC)

Ryan Martin Oné (born 26 June 2006) is a Scottish footballer who plays as a forward for Sheffield United.

== Club career ==
=== Hamilton Academical ===
Born in Coatbridge, Oné began his career with Hamilton Academical, making his first-team debut in the 2022–23 season. He unexpectedly became a first-team regular, with his performances being praised by manager John Rankin. In February 2023 he scored the winning goal in the semi-final of the SPFL Trust Trophy. He was praised again by Rankin for his performance in that match, although he missed the final after being called up to the Scotland under-17 squad instead.

In June 2023, Hamilton rejected an offer from Brighton & Hove Albion for Oné, although the club announced that they expected a deal to be completed. Oné was praised by Rankin for ignoring the speculation.

He scored his first SPFL goal on 12 August 2023, in a Scottish League One match against Kelty Hearts.

=== Sheffield United ===
Oné signed for Sheffield United on 2 September 2023. He scored on his debuts for both the under-18 and under-21 teams. After enjoying a "brilliant start to life in England", he was an unused substitute in United's game against Manchester United, before making his debut on 28 October, in a 5–0 defeat away at Arsenal.

In January 2026 he signed on loan for Lincoln City. He made his debut on 7 February, coming off the bench late on against Plymouth Argyle, and scoring a last minute goal to make the game 4–1. He made his first start against Northampton Town, scoring the first goal in a 4–0 win.

== International career ==
Oné has played for Scotland at under-17, under-19 and under-21 levels. He made his under-21 debut in March 2025.

== Personal life ==
His father is French-Ivorian footballer Armand Oné.

== Playing style ==
After signing for Sheffield United, Oné was described as "As well as being technically astute, Oné is a towering physical presence capable of going toe-to-toe with players considerably more experienced than himself. He also has an eye for goal and has shown plenty of composure in front of goal for Hamilton."

== Career statistics ==
As of match played 17 October 2026

Appearances and goals by club, season and competition
Club	Season	League			National cup (Note: Includes Scottish Cup, FA Cup)		League cup (Note: Includes Scottish League Cup, EFL Cup)		Other		Total	
Club	Season	Division	Apps	Goals	Apps	Goals	Apps	Goals	Apps	Goals	Apps	Goals
Hamilton Academical	2022–23	Scottish Championship	17	0	2	1	4	0	4 (Note: Appearances in the Scottish Challenge Cup.)	1	27	2
Hamilton Academical	2023–24	Scottish League One	4	2	0	0	4	0	0	0	8	2
Hamilton Academical	Total		21	2	2	1	8	0	4	1	35	4
Sheffield United	2023–24	Premier League	1	0	0	0	0	0	0	0	1	0
Sheffield United	2024–25	EFL Championship	12	1	1	0	1	0	0	0	14	1
Sheffield United	2025–26	EFL Championship	6	0	0	0	1	0	0	0	7	0
Sheffield United	2026–27	EFL Championship	3	0	0	0	1	0	0	0	4	0
Sheffield United	Total		22	1	1	0	3	0	0	0	26	1
Lincoln City (loan)	2025–26	EFL League One	16	5	0	0	0	0	0	0	16	5
Career total			59	8	3	1	11	0	4	1	77	10

== Honours ==
Lincoln City

- EFL League One: 2025–26
