= Ben House =

English-born Scottish footballer

Personal information
- Full name: Benjamin House
- Date of birth: 5 July 1999 (age 27)
- Place of birth: Guildford, England
- Height: 1.75 m (5 ft 9 in)
- Position: Striker

Team information
- Current team: Lincoln City
- Number: 18

Youth career
- –2016: Aldershot Town
- 2016–2017: Reading

Senior career*
Years	Team	Apps	(Gls)
2017–2020	Reading	0	(0)
2019	→ Swindon Town (loan)	6	(0)
2019–2020	→ Dagenham & Redbridge (loan)	3	(2)
2020	→ Dagenham & Redbridge (loan)	6	(0)
2020–2022	Eastleigh	54	(13)
2022–	Lincoln City	152	(30)

International career^{‡}
2018	Scotland U20	1	(0)
2019	Scotland U21	2	(0)
- * Club domestic league appearances and goals as of 17:02, 21 November 2026 (UTC) ‡ National team caps and goals as of 17:13, 26 June 2019 (UTC)

Benjamin House (born 5 July 1999) is a professional footballer who plays as a striker for EFL Championship club Lincoln City.

Born in England, he represented Scotland at youth international level.

== Club career ==
=== Reading ===
Born in Guildford, House started his career in the youth team of Aldershot Town before signing for the youth team of Reading in 2016. In July 2017, House signed his first professional contract with Reading. On 15 March 2018, House signed a new contract with Reading until the summer of 2020.

On 4 January 2019, House joined Swindon Town on loan until the end of the 2018–19 season.

On 12 November 2019, House joined Dagenham & Redbridge on loan until 1 January 2020. On 30 January 2020, House returned to Dagenham & Redbridge on loan for the remainder of the season.

On 2 July 2020, Reading announced House had left the club after his contract had expired.

=== Eastleigh ===
In August 2020 he signed for Eastleigh. House made his Eastleigh debut on 3 October 2020, an opening day 5–1 victory at Barnet where House also scored his first goal for the club, to make it 3–1 in the 56th minute of the game. On 9 November, House was awarded National League Player of the Month award for October, scoring five league goals in his first month at the club.

=== Lincoln City ===
On 24 January 2022, House signed for Lincoln City for an undisclosed fee. He made his debut on 29 January 2022, coming off the bench against Burton Albion. He scored his first goal for the club against Portsmouth on 15 April 2022. During the 2022–23 season, he won the Player's Player of the Season award, as well as finishing as the club's top scorer. On 2 August 2023, House signed a new contract keeping him at the club until the summer of 2025. Following the end of the 2024–25 season an option was taken up in his contract.

In October 2025, he signed a new contract until the summer of 2028, following good form at the start to the 2025–26 campaign.

== International career ==
House has represented Scotland at under-20 international youth level. He made his debut for the under-21 team in March 2019.

== Career statistics ==
As of 21 November 2026

Appearances and goals by club, season and competition
Club	Season	League			FA Cup		EFL Cup		Other		Total	
Club	Season	Division	Apps	Goals	Apps	Goals	Apps	Goals	Apps	Goals	Apps	Goals
Reading U23	2017–18	—			—		—		2 (Note: Appearances in EFL Trophy)	1	2	1
Reading	2018–19	Championship	0	0	0	0	0	0	—		0	0
Reading	2019–20	Championship	0	0	1	0	0	0	—		1	0
Reading	Total		0	0	1	0	0	0	—		1	0
Swindon Town (loan)	2018–19	League Two	6	0	—		—		—		6	0
Dagenham & Redbridge (loan)	2019–20	National League	9	2	—		—		2 (Note: Appearances in FA Trophy)	0	11	2
Eastleigh	2020–21	National League	37	9	2	1	—		1	0	40	10
Eastleigh	2021–22	National League	17	4	3	1	—		0	0	20	4
Eastleigh	Total		54	13	5	2	—		1	0	60	15
Lincoln City	2021–22	League One	6	1	—		—		—		6	1
Lincoln City	2022–23	League One	38	12	0	0	3	1	3	0	44	13
Lincoln City	2023–24	League One	20	2	0	0	2	0	0	0	22	2
Lincoln City	2024–25	League One	41	6	0	0	1	0	2	0	44	6
Lincoln City	2025–26	League One	34	7	1	0	2	1	1	1	38	9
Lincoln City	2026–27	Championship	13	2	0	0	2	1	—		15	3
Lincoln City	Total		152	30	1	0	10	3	6	1	169	34
Career total			220	44	7	2	10	3	11	2	248	51

== Honours ==
Lincoln City

- EFL League One: 2025–26

Individual

- National League Player of the Month: October 2020
