= Michael Skubala =

English football coach (born 1982)

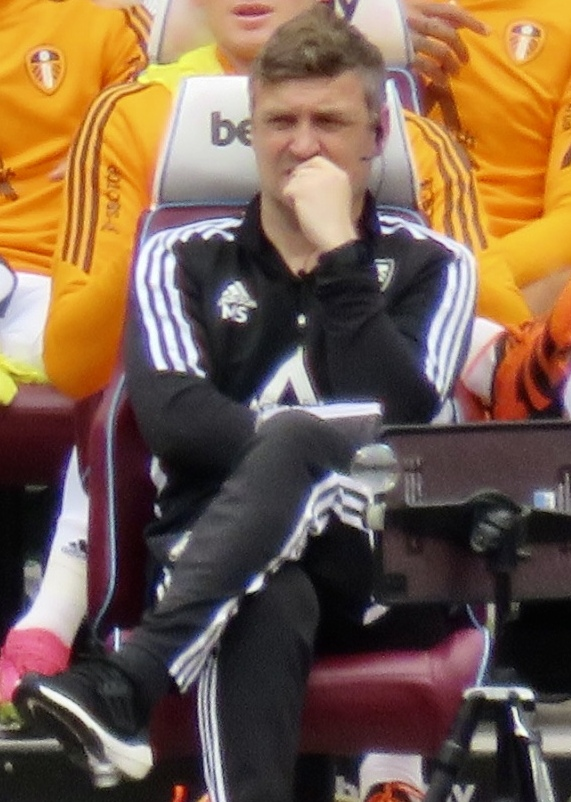
- Skubala in 2023

Personal information
- Full name: Michael Albert Skubala
- Date of birth: 31 October 1982 (age 44)
- Place of birth: Lutterworth, Leicestershire, England

Team information
- Current team: Bristol City (manager)

Managerial career
- Years: Team
- 2023: Leeds United (caretaker)
- 2023–2026: Lincoln City
- 2026–: Bristol City

Michael Albert Skubala (born 31 October 1982) is an English professional football coach who is the manager of EFL Championship club Bristol City.

== Early life ==
Michael Albert Skubala was born on 31 October 1982 in Lutterworth, Leicestershire.

== Coaching career ==
=== Early career ===
Skubala started his coaching career whilst teaching PE at Lutterworth College in Leicestershire. Alongside his job at the school, he had a number of coaching roles including at non-league club Barwell as well as Coventry City and Nottingham Forest academies.

He subsequently became director of football at Loughborough University, renowned for sporting excellence, before being headhunted by the FA, where he became head coach of England national futsal team. Between 2017 and 2020, he guided them to their highest world ranking in two decades and played a key role in the development of future Premier League player and former Wolverhampton Wanderers captain Max Kilman. Skubala then progressed to work with the England U18s, whilst also working at UEFA as a football advisor.

=== Leeds United ===
In July 2022, he was appointed head coach of Leeds United U21s.

In February 2023, Skubala was appointed interim head coach of English Premier League side Leeds United, alongside coaches Paco Gallardo and Chris Armas, after the sacking of head coach Jesse Marsch. After Leeds drew their first game away under Skubala 2–2 at Manchester United, it was announced that he would remain in charge for a second match four days later: the home tie against Manchester United. The club also announced that Skubala would remain in the role while the search for a permanent manager continued, and Skubala said he did not see the temporary role as an 'opportunity' for him. After the appointment of Javi Gracia as head coach, Skubala was promoted to first-team coach at Leeds.

=== Lincoln City ===
On 13 November 2023, he was appointed the head coach of League One club Lincoln City. His first game ended in a 1–0 defeat to Stevenage. His first Lincoln City win came the next game, beating Leyton Orient 1–0. He was nominated for the February 2024 Manager of the Month, picking up 16 points from six unbeaten games. His unbeaten run would continue into March, taking 13 points from the next five games, gaining him another manager of the month nomination. Lincoln City missed out on a play-off place following a 2–0 defeat to League One champions Portsmouth on the final day of the season.

On the eve of the 2024–25 season, Skubala signed a contract extension until the end of the 2027–28 season. Three wins from four and the most goals in League One scored, saw him nominated for August manager of the month. He finished his first full season at the club, finishing 11th with 61 points.

Lincoln City started the 2025–26 season in fine form – in September the club moved up to third place – this form saw Skubala win League One manager of the month. He was again nominated for manager of the month, this time for January, which saw him register 13 points from five games, seeing them defeat promotion rivals Cardiff City and Stockport County. This nomination was followed by back-to back manager of the month wins for January and February, firstly for a second straight unbeaten month in January, earning 14 points from six unbeaten matches to move into the automatic promotion places and the following month, getting 13 points from a possible 15, with a 15–2 goals differential. In March, he would break Lincoln's unbeaten run record, which now stretched to 20 games, following the win against Stockport County.

On 6 April 2026, Lincoln City confirmed promotion to the Championship with five games still to play. He gained a manager of the month nomination for March a few days later, taking 13 points from a possible 15. In April Skubala won the EFL League One Manager of the Season award, after being nominated alongside Graham Alexander, Brian Barry-Murphy and Alex Revell. On 21 April, a 2–0 victory over Doncaster Rovers saw the club secure the league title. Lincoln finished the season winning 103 points, five months unbeaten and Skubala won the final manager of the month for April. At the end of the season he won the LMA League One Manager of the Year.

=== Bristol City ===
On 29 May 2026, he was appointed the manager of EFL Championship club Bristol City, signing a contract until 2029.

== Personal life ==
Born in England, Skubala is of Polish descent through his grandparents who emigrated during World War II.

== Managerial statistics ==
As of 21 November 2026

Managerial record by team and tenure
Team	From	To	Record					Ref.
Team	From	To	P	W	D	L	Win %	Ref.
Leeds United (caretaker)	6 February 2023	21 February 2023	3	0	1	2	0.0	
Lincoln City	13 November 2023	29 May 2026	140	71	33	36	50.7	
Bristol City	29 May 2026	Present	17	5	3	9	29.4	
Total			160	76	37	47	47.5	

== Honours ==
=== Manager ===
Lincoln City

- EFL League One: 2025–26

Individual

- EFL League One Manager of the Month: September 2025, January 2026, February 2026, April 2026
- EFL League One Manager of the Season: 2025–26
- LMA League One Manager of the Year: 2026
