= Mikkel Ladefoged =

Danish footballer

Personal information
- Full name: Mikkel Riis Ladefoged
- Date of birth: 9 June 2003 (age 23)
- Place of birth: Næsby, Denmark
- Height: 2.02 m (6 ft 8 in)
- Position: Forward

Team information
- Current team: Lincoln City
- Number: 11

Youth career
- –2022: Næsby BK
- 2022–2023: Sønderjyske

Senior career*
Years	Team	Apps	(Gls)
2022	Næsby BK		
2022–2025	Sønderjyske	19	(1)
2023–2024	→ Næstved (loan)	19	(8)
2024–2025	→ Esbjerg fB (loan)	11	(1)
2025–2026	Västerås SK	29	(19)
2026–	Lincoln City	9	(3)
- * Club domestic league appearances and goals as of 17:00, 21 November 2026 (UTC)

Mikkel Riis Ladefoged (born 9 June 2003) is a Danish professional footballer who plays as a forward for EFL Championship club Lincoln City.

== Career ==
=== Club career ===
Ladefoged is a product of Næsby Boldklub, where he spent his entire youth career. In March 2022, he was also promoted to the club's first team and finished the season as top scorer in the U19 division with 31 goals.

==== Sønderjyske ====
During the spring of 2022, Ladefoged trained with Danish 1st Division club Sønderjyske so that the parties could get a closer look at each other. On 31 May 2022, the club confirmed that they had signed Ladefoged to a two-year deal. On 30 July 2022, Ladefoged made his debut in a league match against Hillerød.

In the search for more playing time, Ladefoged was loaned out to league colleagues from Næstved Boldklub on 30 August 2023. Besides a knee operation that Ladefoged underwent after the fall season, he played 20 games in Næstved and became the club's top scorer in the 2023–24 season with 9 goals.

In early August 2024, Ladefoged was close to a move to Tromsø IL, which ended up collapsing. On 29 August 2024, Ladefoged was instead loaned out to Esbjerg fB until the end of the season.

==== Västerås SK ====
Six months ahead of schedule, on 24 January 2025, Ladefoged left Esbjerg and instead signed a four-year contract with Swedish Allsvenskan club Västerås SK. However, Ladefoged was out for the first few weeks of his stay with an injury. On 13 August 2026, Västerås SK confirmed that they had agreed a deal with Ladefoged with a foreign club for a deal that represents the largest sale in VSK history. The transfer will take effect on 30 August 2026 and that Ladefoged will not play any further matches for VSK.

==== Lincoln City ====
On 30 August 2026, Ladefoged signed a five-year contract with EFL Championship club Lincoln City for an undisclosed fee, a record transfer fee for Lincoln City, beating the previous record set by Andrei Coubiș the previous month. The fee is believed to be a total of £4.3m million including bonuses and a resale clause of around 20 percent. He made his debut on 1 September, coming off the bench in a 0–0 draw against Blackburn Rovers. His first goal came in the following game against Southampton.

== Career statistics ==
As of 21 November 2026

Appearances and goals by club, season and competition
Club	Season	League			National Cup (Note: Includes Danish Cup & FA Cup)		League Cup (Note: Includes EFL Cup)		Other		Total	
Club	Season	Division	Apps	Goals	Apps	Goals	Apps	Goals	Apps	Goals	Apps	Goals
Sønderjyske	2022–23	Danish 1st Division	13	1	4	1	–		0	0	17	2
Sønderjyske	2023–24	Danish 1st Division	4	0	1	1	–		0	0	5	1
Sønderjyske	2024–25	Danish Superliga	2	0	0	0	–		0	0	2	0
Sønderjyske	Total		19	1	5	2	0	0	0	0	24	3
Næstved (loan)	2023–24	Danish 1st Division	19	8	1	1	–		0	0	20	9
Esbjerg fB (loan)	2024–25	Danish 1st Division	11	1	3	2	–		0	0	14	3
Västerås SK	2025	Superettan	15	10	0	0	–		0	0	15	10
Västerås SK	2026	Allsvenskan	14	9	0	0	–		0	0	14	9
Västerås SK	Total		29	19	0	0	0	0	0	0	29	19
Lincoln City	2026–27	EFL Championship	9	3	0	0	1	0	0	0	10	3
Career total			87	32	9	5	1	0	0	0	97	37
