= 2026–27 Brentford F.C. season =

English football team season

Brentford
2026–27 season
- Owner: Matthew Benham
- Chairman: Cliff Crown
- Head coach: Keith Andrews
- Stadium: Brentford Community Stadium
- Premier League: 8th
- FA Cup: Third round
- EFL Cup: Fourth round
- Top goalscorer: League: Kevin Schade (3); All: Igor Thiago (4)
Home colours	Away colours	Third colours

The 2026–27 season is the 137th season in the history of Brentford Football Club, and the club's sixth consecutive season being in the Premier League. In addition to the domestic league, the club is also participating in the FA Cup and the EFL Cup.

== First team squad ==
Players' ages are as of the opening day of the 2026–27 season.

No.	Player	Nationality	Position	Date of birth (age)	Signed from	Signed in	Contract ends	Notes
Goalkeepers
1	Caoimhín Kelleher	(Republic of Ireland)	GK	23 November 1998 (aged 27)	Liverpool	2025	2030 (+1)	
12	Hákon Valdimarsson	(Iceland)	GK	13 October 2001 (aged 24)	IF Elfsborg	2024	2030 (+2)	
31	Ellery Balcombe	(England)	GK	15 October 1999 (aged 26)	Academy	2016	2029 (+1)	
41	Julian Eyestone	(United States)	GK	21 April 2006 (aged 20)	Unattached	2024	2031 (+2)	Loaned to Rotherham United
—	Matthew Cox	(England)	GK	2 May 2003 (aged 23)	AFC Wimbledon	2021	2028 (+1)	Loaned to Barnet
Defenders
2	Aaron Hickey	(Scotland)	RB / LB	10 June 2002 (aged 24)	Bologna	2022	2028 (+1)	
3	Rico Henry	(Jamaica)	LB	8 July 1997 (aged 29)	Walsall	2016	2027	
4	Sepp van den Berg	(Netherlands)	CB / RB	20 December 2001 (aged 24)	Liverpool	2024	2029	
20	Kristoffer Ajer	(Norway)	CB / RB	17 April 1998 (aged 28)	Celtic	2021	2030 (+1)	
21	Jayden Meghoma	(England)	LB	28 June 2006 (aged 20)	Southampton	2024	2028 (+2)	Loaned to Portsmouth
22	Nathan Collins (c)	(Republic of Ireland)	CB	30 April 2001 (aged 25)	Wolverhampton Wanderers	2023	2029 (+2)	
25	El Hadji Malick Diouf	(Senegal)	LB	28 December 2004 (aged 21)	West Ham United	2026	2031 (+1)	
33	Michael Kayode	(Italy)	RB	10 July 2004 (aged 22)	Fiorentina	2025	2032 (+1)	
36	Kim Ji-soo	(South Korea)	CB	24 December 2004 (aged 21)	Seongnam	2023	2027 (+1)	
43	Benjamin Arthur	(England)	CB	9 October 2005 (aged 20)	Peterborough United	2023	2031 (+1)	Loaned to Portsmouth
44	Jannik Schuster	(Austria)	CB	16 May 2006 (aged 20)	Red Bull Salzburg	2026	2031 (+1)	
48	Benjamin Fredrick	(Nigeria)	RB	28 May 2005 (aged 21)	Simoiben	2024	2030 (+1)	
—	Josh Stephenson	(England)	CB	15 February 2006 (aged 20)	Millwall	2024	2028 (+1)	Loaned to Crewe Alexandra
Midfielders
6	Yehor Yarmolyuk	(Ukraine)	CM	1 March 2004 (aged 22)	Dnipro-1	2022	2031 (+1)	
8	Mathias Jensen	(Denmark)	CM	1 January 1996 (aged 30)	Celta Vigo	2019	2027	
10	Josh Dasilva	(England)	AM	23 October 1998 (aged 27)	Arsenal	2018	2027	
14	Fábio Carvalho	(Portugal)	AM	30 August 2002 (aged 23)	Liverpool	2024	2029 (+1)	
17	Antoni Milambo	(Netherlands)	AM	3 March 2005 (aged 21)	Feyenoord	2025	2030 (+1)	
18	Mamadou Sangaré	(Mali)	DM	26 June 2002 (aged 24)	Lens	2026	2031 (+1)	
24	Mikkel Damsgaard	(Denmark)	AM	3 July 2000 (aged 26)	Sampdoria	2022	2030 (+1)	
26	Yunus Emre Konak	(Turkey)	DM	10 January 2006 (aged 20)	Sivasspor	2024	2031 (+1)	Loaned to Lincoln City
27	Vitaly Janelt	(Germany)	DM	10 May 1998 (aged 28)	VfL Bochum	2020	2030 (+1)	
45	Romelle Donovan	(England)	AM	30 November 2006 (aged 19)	Birmingham City	2025	2030 (+1)	Loaned to Sheffield United
Attackers
7	Kevin Schade	(Germany)	LW / FW	27 November 2001 (aged 24)	SC Freiburg	2023	2028	
9	Igor Thiago	(Brazil)	FW	26 June 2001 (aged 25)	Club Brugge	2024	2031 (+1)	
11	Dango Ouattara	(Burkina Faso)	W	11 February 2002 (aged 24)	Bournemouth	2025	2030 (+1)	
13	Callum Wilson	(England)	FW	27 February 1992 (aged 34)	West Ham United	2026	2027	
19	Jaidon Anthony	(England)	LW	1 December 1999 (aged 26)	Burnley	2026	2030 (+1)	
23	Keane Lewis-Potter	(England)	LW / LB	22 February 2001 (aged 25)	Hull City	2022	2031 (+1)	
39	Gustavo Nunes	(Brazil)	LW	20 November 2005 (aged 20)	Grêmio	2024	2030 (+2)	
47	Kaye Furo	(Belgium)	FW	6 February 2007 (aged 19)	Club Brugge	2026	2031	
Players who left the club mid-season
5	Ethan Pinnock	(Jamaica)	CB	29 May 1993 (aged 33)	Barnsley	2019	2027	Transferred to Coventry City

== Transfers and contracts ==
=== Transfers in ===
Date	Position	Nationality	Player	From	Fee	Ref.
1 July 2026 (Note: Schuster's transfer was announced on 15 May 2026 and his contract commenced on 1 July 2026.)	CB	(Austria)	Jannik Schuster	(Austria) Red Bull Salzburg	£12,000,000 (Note: A potential further £4,000,000 with add-ons.)	
2 July 2026	RB	(England)	Joseph Wheeler-Henry	(England) Chelsea	Undisclosed	
7 July 2026	LW	(England)	Jaidon Anthony	(England) Burnley	£15,000,000 (Note: A potential further £2,000,000 with performance-related add-ons.)	
9 July 2026	CF	(England)	Callum Wilson	(England) West Ham United	Free	
20 July 2026	CM	(England)	Sam Sene-Richardson	(England) Chatham Town	Undisclosed	
1 August 2026	CM	(Mali)	Mamadou Sangaré	(France) Lens	£41,000,000	
12 August 2026	CB	(Republic of Ireland)	Donal O'Connor	(Republic of Ireland) Cork City	£145,000 (Note: A further £170,000 if makes a first-team appearance)	
15 August 2026	CM	(Ecuador)	Darwin Guagua	(Ecuador) Independiente del Valle	Undisclosed	
17 August 2026	RM	(Northern Ireland)	Ben Wilson	(Northern Ireland) Glenavon	Undisclosed	
28 August 2026	LB	(Senegal)	El Hadji Malick Diouf	(England) West Ham United	£35,000,000 (Note: A potential further £5,000,000 in add-ons.)	
2 September 2026	LW	(England)	Kiefer Gorman	(England) Watford	Undisclosed	

=== Loans in ===
Date	Position	Nationality	Player	From	Loaned until	Ref.
29 July 2026	GK	(United States)	Aidan Stokes	(United States) New York Red Bulls	End of Season (Note: Option to make the move permanent at the conclusion of the loan deal.)	

=== Loans out ===
Date	Position	Nationality	Player	To	Until	Ref.
30 June 2026	RW	(England)	Michael Olakigbe	(Austria) WSG Tirol	End of Season	
8 July 2026	RW	(England)	Romelle Donovan	(England) Sheffield United	End of Season	
13 July 2026	CM	(England)	Ben Krauhaus	(Scotland) Falkirk	End of Season	
25 July 2026	GK	(England)	Matthew Cox	(England) Barnet	End of Season	
11 August 2026	GK	(United States)	Julian Eyestone	(England) Rotherham United	End of Season	
12 August 2026	CB	(England)	Benjamin Arthur	(England) Portsmouth	End of Season	
15 August 2026	CM	(Ecuador)	Darwin Guagua	(Spain) Mérida	End of Season	
18 August 2026	CDM	(Turkey)	Yunus Konak	(England) Lincoln City	End of Season	
21 August 2026	CB	(England)	Josh Stephenson	(England) Crewe Alexandra	End of Season	
1 September 2026	LB	(England)	Jayden Meghoma	(England) Portsmouth	End of Season	

=== Transfers out ===
Date	Position	Nationality	Player	To	Fee	Ref.
15 June 2026 (Note: The transfer was announced on 9 June, and would become official on 15 June once the transfer window opened.)	CF	(Scotland)	Ethan Laidlaw	(Scotland) Falkirk	Undisclosed	
19 June 2026	LW	(England)	Tony Yogane	(Scotland) Aberdeen	Undisclosed	
29 June 2026	CM	(Nigeria)	Frank Onyeka	(England) Coventry City	£6,800,000	
30 June 2026	CB	(England)	Gregory Asemokhai	(Wales) Swansea City	Released	
30 June 2026	CM	(England)	Staitham Bowen	(Wales) Swansea City	Released	
30 June 2026	CM	(England)	Ethan Brierley	(England) Huddersfield Town	Undisclosed	
30 June 2026	RB	(England)	Maxwell McKnight	(England) Hornchurch	Released	
30 June 2026	CF	(England)	Michael McSorley	(England) Farnham Town	Released	
30 June 2026	CM	(England)	Yerime Ouattara	(England) Blackburn Rovers	Released	
30 June 2026	CM	(England)	Kyrie Pierre	(England) Slough Town	Released	
30 June 2026	GK	(Zimbabwe)	Marley Tavaziva		Released	
30 June 2026	CM	(England)	Ryan Trevitt	(England) Wigan Athletic	Released	
29 July 2026	CDM	(England)	Jordan Henderson	(England) Chelsea	Free	
3 August 2026	LB	(Republic of Ireland)	Conor McManus	(England) Gillingham	Undisclosed	
7 August 2026	CF	(Wales)	Iwan Morgan	(England) Grimsby Town	Undisclosed	
26 August 2026	CB	(Jamaica)	Ethan Pinnock	(England) Coventry City	£5,000,000 (Note: A potential further £1,000,000 in add-ons)	

=== New contracts ===
Date	Position	Nationality	Player	Contract expiry	Ref.
1 June 2026	CM	(England)	Josh Dasilva	30 June 2027	
1 June 2026	LB	(Jamaica)	Rico Henry	30 June 2027	
1 June 2026	CM	(Denmark)	Mathias Jensen	30 June 2027	
10 June 2026	CB	(England)	Caelan Avenell	Undisclosed	
10 June 2026	CF	(England)	Domeiro Bobb-Semple	Undisclosed	
10 June 2026	CF	(Benin)	Michel Boni	Undisclosed	
10 June 2026	CM	(England)	Ethan Brierley	30 June 2027	
10 June 2026	RW	(England)	Naeem Giscombe	30 June 2027	
10 June 2026	CB	(England)	Aidan Golding	Undisclosed	
10 June 2026	CB	(England)	Andre Grey	Undisclosed	
10 June 2026	CM	(England)	Isaac Holland	30 June 2027	
10 June 2026	CB	(Lithuania)	Matas Klimas	30 June 2027	
10 June 2026	LB	(Republic of Ireland)	Conor McManus	Undisclosed	
10 June 2026	CM	(England)	Riley Owen	30 June 2027	
10 June 2026	CF	(Italy)	Nedved Owusu	30 June 2027	
10 June 2026	LB	(Wales)	Luca Picotto	30 June 2027	
10 June 2026	CM	(England)	Isaiah Powis	Undisclosed	
10 June 2026	RB	(England)	Ollie Shield	Undisclosed	
10 June 2026	CB	(Australia)	Archie Trimboli	Undisclosed	
10 June 2026	GK	(Germany)	Connor Wolfheimer	30 June 2027	
3 July 2026	RB	(Italy)	Michael Kayode	30 June 2032 (Note: Option of a further year in the club's favour)	
10 July 2026	CB	(Nigeria)	Benjamin Fredrick	30 June 2030	
12 August 2026	GK	(England)	Ellery Balcombe	30 June 2030	
18 August 2026	CDM	(Turkey)	Yunus Konak	30 June 2031	
24 August 2026	CF	(England)	Jovan Kasujja	Undisclosed (Note: First professional contract)	
24 August 2026	CF	(Northern Ireland)	Coran Madden	Undisclosed	

== Pre-season and friendlies ==
On 3 June, Brentford announced three pre-season friendlies against Rennes and Eintracht Frankfurt.

Win Draw Loss Fixtures

15 July 2026 Friendly	Brentford	3–2	AFC Wimbledon	Osterley
13:00 BST	Morgan 40'; Anthony; Damsgaard 75'	Report	Sasu 2'; Horan 50'	Stadium: Jersey Road; Attendance: 0 (behind closed doors)

1 August 2026 Friendly	Brentford	0–1	Watford	Osterley
		Report	Kjerrumgaard 28' (pen.)	Stadium: Jersey Road; Attendance: 0 (behind closed doors)

5 August 2026 Friendly	Brentford	4–1	Wycombe Wanderers	Osterley
	Damsgaard 25'; Henry 36'; Wilson; Lewis-Potter 90'	Report	Tezgel 52'	Stadium: Jersey Road; Attendance: 0 (behind closed doors)

8 August 2026 Friendly	Rennes	1–2	Brentford	Rennes, France
11:00 CEST	Do Marcolino 36'	Report	Meghoma 70'; Furo 78'	Stadium: Stade Rennais Training Centre; Attendance: 0 (behind closed doors)

8 August 2026 Friendly	Rennes	2–4	Brentford	Rennes, France
17:00 CEST	Lepaul (yellow card) 30'; Blas (yellow card) 45'; Szymański 46'; Rongier 71'	Report	Thiago 19'; Pinnock 28'; Ouattara 47', (yellow card) 76'; Wilson 49'; Mawene (yellow card) 90'	Stadium: Roazhon Park; Referee: Azzedine Souifi

15 August 2026 Friendly	Brentford	7–0	Eintracht Frankfurt	Brentford
15:00 BST	Schade 2', 70'; Sangaré 12'; Thiago 40', 68'; Ouattara 52'; Lewis-Potter 58'	Report		Stadium: Brentford Community Stadium; Attendance: 13,753; Referee: Darren England

2 October 2026 Friendly	Brentford	2–2	Norwich City	Brentford
12:30 BST	Lewis-Potter 44'; Carvalho 49'	Report		Stadium: Gtech Community Stadium; Attendance: 0 (BCD)

== Competitions ==
=== Overall record ===
Competition	First match	Last match	Starting round	Final position	Record							
Competition	First match	Last match	Starting round	Final position	Pld	W	D	L	GF	GA	GD	Win %
Premier League	22 August 2026	30 May 2027	Matchday 1	TBD	10	3	5	2	16	11	+5	30.00
FA Cup	January 2027	TBD	Third round	TBD	0	0	0	0	0	0	+0	—
EFL Cup	25 August 2026	28 October 2026	Second round	Fourth round	3	2	0	1	10	5	+5	66.67
Total					13	5	5	3	26	16	+10	38.46

Last updated: 8 November 2026
Source: Soccerway

=== Premier League ===
==== League table ====
Pos	Team	Pld	W	D	L	GF	GA	GD	Pts
6	Everton	10	4	4	2	12	10	+2	16
7	Bournemouth	10	4	3	3	16	14	+2	15
8	Brentford	10	3	5	2	16	11	+5	14
9	Leeds United	10	3	5	2	10	8	+2	14
10	Aston Villa	10	3	4	3	14	17	−3	13

Updated to match(es) played on 8 November 2026. Source: Premier League
Rules for classification: 1) Points; 2) Goal difference; 3) Goals scored; 4) If the champions, relegated teams or qualified teams for UEFA competitions cannot be determined by rules 1 to 3 following the completion of the competition, rules 4.1 to 4.3 are applied between such teams – 4.1) Head-to-head points; 4.2) Head-to-head away goals; 4.3) Play-off at a neutral site.

==== Results summary ====
Overall								Home						Away					
Pld	W	D	L	GF	GA	GD	Pts	W	D	L	GF	GA	GD	W	D	L	GF	GA	GD
10	3	5	2	16	11	+5	14	3	1	1	10	3	+7	0	4	1	6	8	−2

Last updated: 8 November 2026.
Source: Soccerway

==== Results by round ====
Round	1	2	3	4	5	6	7	8	9	10	11	12	13	14	15	16	17	18	19	20
Ground	H	A	H	A	H	A	H	A	H	A	H	A	H	H	A	H	A	A	H	A
Result	W	D	D	D	W	D	L	D	W	L										
Position	3	5	5	7	4	4	6	6	6	8										
Points	3	4	5	6	9	10	10	11	14	14										

Updated to match(es) played on 8 November 2026. Source: Premier League
A = Away; H = Home; W = Win; D = Draw; L = Loss; P = Postponed

==== Matches ====
On 19 June 2026, the Premier League fixtures were released.

Win Draw Loss Fixtures

22 August 2026 1	Brentford	3–0	Tottenham Hotspur	Brentford
17:30 BST	Lewis-Potter 12'; Janelt 33', (yellow card) 78'; Kayode 49'; Thiago (penalty missed) 55'	Report	Gallagher (yellow card) 34'	Stadium: Brentford Community Stadium; Attendance: 17,180; Referee: Michael Oliver

30 August 2026 2	Leeds United	1–1	Brentford	Leeds
14:00 BST	Calvert-Lewin 79'	Report	Anthony (yellow card) 30'; Schade 41'; Ajer (yellow card) 74'; Janelt (yellow card) 76'; Collins (yellow card) 90+3'	Stadium: Elland Road; Attendance: 35,974; Referee: Tony Harrington
Note: Fixture was initially scheduled for 29 August, but was rescheduled for live Sky Sports broadcasting.

5 September 2026 3	Brentford	1–1	Sunderland	Brentford
15:00 BST	Sangaré (yellow card) 30'; Janelt 57', (yellow card) 62'; Yarmolyuk (yellow card) 69'	Report	Sadiki (yellow card) 14'; Le Fée 82' (pen.); Xhaka (yellow card) 88'	Stadium: Brentford Community Stadium; Attendance: 17,131; Referee: Thomas Bramall

12 September 2026 4	Bournemouth	2–2	Brentford	Bournemouth
15:00 BST	Kluivert 38'; Tavernier (yellow card) 45+4', (goal) 52'; Hill (yellow card) 63'; Cook (yellow card) 85'; Smith (yellow card) 87'; Brooks (yellow card) 89'	Report	Schade 34', 56'; Thiago (yellow card) 45+3'	Stadium: Dean Court; Attendance: 11,183; Referee: Jarred Gillett

18 September 2026 5	Brentford	3–0	Chelsea	Brentford
20:00 BST	Anthony 61'; Thiago 83', (yellow card) 84'; Sangaré (yellow card) 85'; Carvalho 90+4'	Report		Stadium: Brentford Community Stadium; Attendance: 17,193; Referee: Andy Madley
Note: Fixture was initially scheduled for 19 September, but was rescheduled for live Sky Sports broadcasting.

10 October 2026 6	Aston Villa	2–2	Brentford	Birmingham
15:00 BST	Jackson 12'; Buendía (yellow card) 45+3'; Cash (yellow card) 72'; McGinn 77'	Report	Yarmolyuk 10'; Thiago (yellow card) 35'; Janelt (yellow card) 75'; Ajer 79', (yellow card) 84'; Kayode (yellow card) 82'; Wilson (yellow card) 90+5'	Stadium: Villa Park; Attendance: 36,636; Referee: Craig Pawson

17 October 2026 7	Brentford	1–2	Liverpool	Brentford
15:00 BST	Lewis-Potter 44'; Yarmolyuk (red card) 45+8'; Thiago (yellow card) 46'; Schade (yellow card) 60'; Janelt (yellow card) 63' (yellow-red card) 90+2'	Report	Barcola (yellow card) 31'; Jacquet (yellow card) 49'; Mac Allister (yellow card) 53'; Muñoz 62'; Isak 70'	Stadium: Brentford Community Stadium; Attendance: 17,232; Referee: John Brooks

25 October 2026 8	Hull City	1–1	Brentford	Kingston upon Hull
14:00 BST	McBurnie 24' (pen.)	Report	Hickey (yellow card) 23'; Ouattara 63'	Stadium: MKM Stadium; Attendance: 24,259; Referee: Robert Jones
Note: Fixture was initially scheduled for 24 October, but was rescheduled for live Sky Sports broadcasting.

31 October 2026 9	Brentford	2–0	Nottingham Forest	Brentford
15:00 GMT	Milenković 30' (o.g.); Kayode (yellow card) 68'; Thiago 76'	Report	Milenković (yellow card) 36'; Muñoz (yellow card) 64'; McAtee (yellow card) 83'	Stadium: Brentford Community Stadium; Attendance: 17,108; Referee: Darren England

8 November 2026 10	Brighton & Hove Albion	2–0	Brentford	Brighton and Hove
14:00 GMT	Gómez 15'; Andrés (yellow card) 22'; Boscagli (yellow card) 27'; Groß 42' (pen.); Wieffer (yellow card) 51'; Dunk (yellow card) 61'	Report	Ajer (yellow card) 5'; Thiago (red card) 23'; Schade (yellow card) 69'	Stadium: Falmer Stadium; Attendance: 31,629; Referee: Michael Oliver
Note: Fixture was initially scheduled for 7 November, but was pushed back a day for live Sky Sports broadcasting.

23 November 2026 11	Brentford	v	Everton	Brentford
20:00 GMT				Stadium: Brentford Community Stadium
Note: Fixture was initially scheduled for 21 November, but was pushed back two-days for live Sky Sports broadcasting.

28 November 2026 12	Manchester United	v	Brentford	Trafford
15:00 GMT				Stadium: Old Trafford

2 December 2026 13	Brentford	v	Arsenal	Brentford
20:15 GMT				Stadium: Brentford Community Stadium
Note: Fixture was initially scheduled for a 20:00 kick-off, but was pushed back fifteen minutes for live Sky Sports broadcasting.

5 December 2026 14	Brentford	v	Manchester City	Brentford
20:00 GMT				Stadium: Brentford Community Stadium
Note: Fixture was initially scheduled for a 15:00 kick-off, but was pushed back for live Sky Sports broadcasting.

12 December 2026 15	Fulham	v	Brentford	Fulham
15:00 GMT				Stadium: Craven Cottage

19 December 2026 16	Brentford	v	Newcastle United	Brentford
12:30 GMT				Stadium: Brentford Community Stadium
Note: Fixture was initially scheduled for a 15:00 kick-off, but was brought forward for live TNT Sports broadcasting.

26 December 2026 17	Ipswich Town	v	Brentford	Ipswich
15:00 GMT				Stadium: Portman Road

30 December 2026 18	Coventry City	v	Brentford	Coventry
19:30 GMT				Stadium: Coventry Building Society Arena
Note: Fixture was initially scheduled for a 15:00 kick-off, but was pushed back for live Sky Sports broadcasting.

2 January 2027 19	Brentford	v	Crystal Palace	Brentford
15:00 GMT				Stadium: Brentford Community Stadium

5 January 2027 20	Arsenal	v	Brentford	Holloway
19:30 GMT				Stadium: Emirates Stadium
Note: Fixture was initially scheduled for 6 January, but was brought forward a day for live Sky Sports broadcasting.

=== FA Cup ===
Win Draw Loss Fixtures

=== EFL Cup ===
As a Premier League side not involved in any European competition, Brentford entered the EFL Cup in the second round, and were drawn away to Birmingham City. They were then drawn away to Reading in the third round, and away to Sunderland in the fourth round.

Win Draw Loss Fixtures

25 August 2026 Second round	Birmingham City	1–6	Brentford	Bordesley
20:00 BST	Gray 28'; Solís (yellow card) 36'; Osayi-Samuel (yellow card) 55'	Report	Wilson 6'; Schuster (yellow card) 26'; Hickey 35'; Collins 40', 77'; Damsgaard 70'; Thiago 73'	Stadium: St Andrew's; Attendance: 17,722; Referee: Tim Robinson

15 September 2026 Third round	Reading	1–2	Brentford	Reading
20:00 BST	O'Connor 72'	Report	Wilson 3'; Carvalho 45+1'	Stadium: Madejski Stadium; Attendance: 13,489; Referee: Tom Nield

28 October 2026 Fourth round	Sunderland	3–2	Brentford	Sunderland
19:45 GMT	Talbi 26'; Tutyerov 29'; Fofana 39'; Rigg (yellow card) 89'	Report	Wilson 42'; Schade (yellow card) 74'; Janelt (yellow card) 83'; Schuster (yellow card) 85'; Thiago 90+4'	Stadium: Stadium of Light; Attendance: 24,305; Referee: Gavin Ward

== Statistics ==
=== Appearances and goals ===
As of match played 8 November 2026

No.	Pos.	Nat.	Player	Premier League		FA Cup		EFL Cup		Total	
No.	Pos.	Nat.	Player	Apps	Goals	Apps	Goals	Apps	Goals	Apps	Goals
1	GK	(Republic of Ireland)	Caoimhín Kelleher	10	0	0	0	0	0	10	0
2	DF	(Scotland)	Aaron Hickey	3+7	0	0	0	1+2	0	4+9	0
3	DF	(Jamaica)	Rico Henry	0+1	0	0	0	2	0	2+1	0
4	DF	(Netherlands)	Sepp van den Berg	4	0	0	0	0	0	4	0
6	MF	(Ukraine)	Yehor Yarmolyuk	4+4	1	0	0	1+1	0	5+5	1
7	FW	(Germany)	Kevin Schade	9+1	3	0	0	0+2	0	9+3	3
8	MF	(Denmark)	Mathias Jensen	4+2	0	0	0	0+1	0	4+3	0
9	FW	(Brazil)	Igor Thiago	10	2	0	0	1+2	2	11+2	4
11	FW	(Burkina Faso)	Dango Ouattara	6+4	1	0	0	2+1	0	8+5	1
12	GK	(Iceland)	Hákon Valdimarsson	0	0	0	0	2	0	2	0
13	FW	(England)	Callum Wilson	0+7	0	0	0	3	3	3+7	3
14	MF	(Portugal)	Fábio Carvalho	0+1	1	0	0	1	1	1+1	2
18	MF	(Mali)	Mamadou Sangaré	7+3	0	0	0	2+1	0	9+4	0
19	FW	(England)	Jaidon Anthony	5+4	1	0	0	2+1	0	7+5	1
20	DF	(Norway)	Kristoffer Ajer	10	1	0	0	1+1	0	11+1	1
22	DF	(Republic of Ireland)	Nathan Collins	3+1	0	0	0	2	2	5+1	2
23	DF	(England)	Keane Lewis-Potter	10	2	0	0	1+1	0	11+1	2
24	MF	(Denmark)	Mikkel Damsgaard	3+5	0	0	0	2+1	1	5+6	1
25	DF	(Senegal)	El Hadji Malick Diouf	1+5	0	0	0	2	0	3+5	0
27	MF	(Germany)	Vitaly Janelt	9	2	0	0	2	0	11	2
31	GK	(England)	Ellery Balcombe	0	0	0	0	1	0	1	0
33	DF	(Italy)	Michael Kayode	9+1	1	0	0	2+1	0	11+2	1
44	DF	(Austria)	Jannik Schuster	3+1	0	0	0	2+1	0	5+2	0

=== Discipline ===
As of match played 8 November 2026

Rank	No.	Pos.	Player	Premier League			FA Cup			EFL Cup			Total		
Rank	No.	Pos.	Player	Yellow card	(yellow card) (yellow-red card)	Red card	Yellow card	(yellow card) (yellow-red card)	Red card	Yellow card	(yellow card) (yellow-red card)	Red card	Yellow card	(yellow card) (yellow-red card)	Red card
1	9	ST	(Brazil) Igor Thiago	4	0	1	0	0	0	0	0	0	4	0	1
2	6	CM	(Ukraine) Yehor Yarmolyuk	1	0	1	0	0	0	0	0	0	1	0	1
3	27	CDM	(Germany) Vitaly Janelt	4	1	0	0	0	0	1	0	0	5	1	0
4	20	CB	(Norway) Kristoffer Ajer	3	0	0	0	0	0	0	0	0	3	0	0
5	7	LW	(Germany) Kevin Schade	1	0	0	0	0	0	1	0	0	2	0	0
5	18	CM	(Mali) Mamadou Sangaré	2	0	0	0	0	0	0	0	0	2	0	0
5	33	RB	(Italy) Michael Kayode	2	0	0	0	0	0	0	0	0	2	0	0
5	44	CB	(Austria) Jannik Schuster	0	0	0	0	0	0	2	0	0	2	0	0
9	2	RB	(Scotland) Aaron Hickey	1	0	0	0	0	0	0	0	0	1	0	0
9	13	CF	(England) Callum Wilson	1	0	0	0	0	0	0	0	0	1	0	0
9	19	LW	(England) Jaidon Anthony	1	0	0	0	0	0	0	0	0	1	0	0
9	22	CB	(Republic of Ireland) Nathan Collins	1	0	0	0	0	0	0	0	0	1	0	0
Total				22	1	2	0	0	0	4	0	0	26	1	2

== Awards ==
=== Player awards ===
==== Premier League Player of the Month ====
Month	Pos.	Player	Pld	G	A	CS	S	Result	Ref.
August	MF	(Mali) Mamadou Sangaré	2	0	1	–	–	Nominated	
September	FW	(Germany) Kevin Schade	3	2	0	—	—	Nominated	

==== Premier League Goal of the Month ====
Month	Pos.	Player	Opposition	Result	Ref.
August	DF	(England) Keane Lewis-Potter	v. Tottenham Hotpur	Nominated	
August	FW	(Germany) Kevin Schade	v. Leeds United	Nominated	
