= 2026–27 Lincoln City F.C. season =

141st season in existence of Lincoln City FC

Lincoln City
2026–27 season
- Chairman: Ron Fowler
- Joint head coach: Chris Cohen & Tom Shaw
- Stadium: ProAmpac Stadium
- Championship: 20th
- FA Cup: Third round
- EFL Cup: Third round (vs. Bournemouth)
- Top goalscorer: League: Mikkel Ladefoged (3); All: Mikkel Ladefoged; Ben House; Dom Jefferies (3 each)
- Highest home attendance: 10,758 vs Southampton, 5 September 2026, Championship
- Lowest home attendance: 10,267 vs Blackburn Rovers, 1 September 2026, Championship
- Average home league attendance: 10,544
- Biggest win: 4–1 vs Blackpool (A), 25 August 2026, EFL Cup; 4–1 vs Burnley (H), 24 October 2026, Championship
- Biggest defeat: 0–6 vs West Ham United (H), 14 October 2026, Championship

The 2026–27 season is the 143rd season in the history of Lincoln City and their first season in the Championship following promotion from League One the previous season. The club are participating in the Championship, the FA Cup, and the EFL Cup.

== Season overview ==
=== June ===
On 10 June, Lincoln City announced their new first year scholars of; Tariro Darikwa, Fletcher Don-Duncan, Leo Fifield, Sam Male, Isaac Shaw and Prem Sidhu.

=== July ===
On 1 July, Lincoln confirmed they had agreed a five-year extension to its technical kit partner OXEN Sports.

On 2 July, Lincoln launched their 2026–27 home shirt, whilst also confirming that Branston would continue as their front of shirt for the home, away and third kits, with Gen2 Energy on the back of the shirt and Easy Heat Pumps the sleeve sponsor.

On 7 July, ProAmpac agreed a 10-year stadium naming rights deal for Sincil Bank to be called the ProAmpac Stadium.

On 23 July, Lincoln launched their 2026–27 away shirt, with Nana Tate the front of shirt sponsor, Gen2 Energy on the back and Logicool on the sleeve. IFI Group feature on the shorts.

On 24 July, Clive Nates stepped down as co-vice chairman, but would remain a non-executive director at the club, whilst the club also confirmed Amanda Slater stepped down from her position as the John O’Gaunt’s representative on 30 June.

=== August ===
On 8 August, Lincoln confirmed their squad numbers for the season.

On 12 August, Bobby Copping was promoted to chief commercial officer, whilst Danny Seaborne promoted to chief operating officer.

On 12 August, Lincoln launched their 2026–27 third shirt, with Nana Tate the front of shirt sponsor, sleeve partner Logicool and back of shirt partner Rilmac. IFI Group feature on the back of the shorts.

=== September ===
On 3 September, Lincoln confirmed their 25-man squad for the Championship season.

=== October ===
On 21 October, Deji Elerewe red card against Millwall on 17 October was successfully appealed.

=== November ===
On 2 November, announced that their game and any subsequent competitive games against Watford would be the Graham Taylor Cup, to celebrate the legacy of Graham Taylor.

== Current squad ==
As of 22 October 2026

No.	Name	Position	Nationality	Place of birth	Date of birth (age)	Signed from	Date signed	Fee	Contract end
Goalkeepers
1	George Wickens	GK	(England)	Petersfield	8 November 2001 (age 25)	Fulham	20 July 2024	Nominal Fee	30 June 2029
21	Jamie Pardington	GK	(England)	Aldridge	20 July 2000 (age 26)	Cheltenham Town	1 July 2024	Free Transfer	30 June 2028
46	Joe Gauci	GK	(Australia)	Adelaide	4 July 2000 (age 26)	Aston Villa	28 July 2026	Loan	31 May 2027
Defenders
2	Tendayi Darikwa	RB	(Zimbabwe)	Nottingham	13 December 1991 (age 34)	Apollon Limassol	5 July 2023	Free Transfer	30 June 2028
3	Adam Reach	LB	(England)	Chester-le-Street	3 February 1993 (age 33)	Wycombe Wanderers	1 September 2025	Free Transfer	30 June 2028
4	Andrei Coubiș	CB	(Romania)	Milan	29 September 2003 (age 23)	Universitatea Cluj	25 July 2026	Undisclosed	30 June 2031
6	Ryley Towler	CB	(England)	Bristol	6 May 2002 (age 24)	Portsmouth	7 July 2025	Undisclosed	30 June 2030
15	Sonny Bradley	CB	(England)	Kingston upon Hull	13 September 1991 (age 35)	Derby County	1 July 2025	Free Transfer	30 June 2027
20	Callum Elder	LB	(Australia)	Sydney	27 January 1995 (age 31)	Derby County	1 July 2026	Free Transfer	30 June 2028
22	Tom Hamer	CB	(England)	Bolton	1 October 1999 (age 27)	Burton Albion	19 July 2024	Undisclosed	30 June 2029
23	Josh Honohan	LB	(Republic of Ireland)	Carrigaline	28 March 2001 (age 25)	Shamrock Rovers	1 January 2026	Undisclosed	30 June 2029
25	Deji Elerewe	CB	(England)	Croydon	14 September 2003 (age 23)	Bromley	25 January 2026	Undisclosed	30 June 2029
33	Daniel Oyegoke	RB	(England)	Barnet	3 January 2003 (age 23)	Hellas Verona	1 September 2026	Undisclosed	30 June 2030
39	Charlie Parks	CB	(England)		19 April 2007 (age 19)	Academy	13 May 2025	—N/a	30 June 2027
Midfielders
7	Reeco Hackett	RM	(Saint Lucia)	Redbridge	9 January 1998 (age 28)	Portsmouth	14 June 2023	Undisclosed	30 June 2029
8	Tom Bayliss	CM	(England)	Leicester	6 April 1999 (age 27)	Shrewsbury Town	1 July 2024	Free Transfer	30 June 2028
14	Conor McGrandles	CM	(Scotland)	Falkirk	24 September 1995 (age 31)	Charlton Athletic	14 June 2024	Undisclosed	30 June 2028
16	Dom Jefferies	RM	(Wales)	Newport	22 May 2002 (age 24)	Gillingham	18 July 2024	Undisclosed	30 June 2028
24	Ivan Varfolomeev	DM	(Ukraine)	Simferopol	24 March 2004 (age 22)	Slovan Liberec	21 August 2025	Undisclosed	30 June 2030
26	Yunus Konak	DM	(Turkey)	Batman	10 January 2006 (age 20)	Brentford	18 August 2026	Loan	31 May 2027
Forwards
10	Mason Melia	CF	(Republic of Ireland)	Newtownmountkennedy	22 September 2007 (age 19)	Tottenham Hotspur	5 August 2026	Loan	31 May 2027
11	Mikkel Ladefoged	CF	(Denmark)	Næsby	9 June 2003 (age 23)	Västerås SK	30 August 2026	Undisclosed	30 June 2031
17	Rob Street	CF	(England)	Oxford	26 September 2001 (age 25)	Cheltenham Town	2 July 2024	Undisclosed	30 June 2030
18	Ben House	LW	(Scotland)	Guildford	5 July 1999 (age 27)	Eastleigh	24 January 2022	Undisclosed	30 June 2028
19	Tanto Olaofe	CF	(England)	Lewisham	21 November 1999 (age 27)	Charlton Athletic	7 August 2026	Loan	31 May 2027
27	Chiedozie Ogbene	RW	(Republic of Ireland)	Lagos	1 May 1997 (age 29)	Ipswich Town	1 September 2026	Loan	1 January 2027
29	Ethan Wheatley	CF	(England)	Stockport	20 January 2006 (age 20)	Manchester United	24 August 2026	Loan	31 May 2027
34	Freddie Draper	CF	(England)	Oxford	28 July 2004 (age 22)	Derby County	1 July 2020	Free Transfer	30 June 2030
Out on loan
9	James Collins	CF	(Republic of Ireland)	Coventry	1 December 1990 (age 35)	Derby County	20 January 2025	Undisclosed	30 June 2027
13	Zach Jeacock	GK	(England)	Birmingham	8 May 2001 (age 25)	Birmingham City	3 July 2024	Free Transfer	30 June 2029
36	Zane Okoro	RW	(United States)	Norwalk	7 May 2007 (age 19)	Brooke House College	19 June 2025	—N/a	30 June 2029
	Oisin Gallagher	CM	(Republic of Ireland)	Derry	2 December 2004 (age 21)	Derry City	1 July 2021	Undisclosed	30 June 2029
	Oscar Thorn	RW	(England)	Southend-on-Sea	22 March 2004 (age 22)	Colchester United	26 August 2025	Undisclosed	30 June 2029

=== International Call-Ups ===
No	Name	Team	Competition	Opposition	Date	Ref
24	(Ukraine) Ivan Varfolomeev	Ukraine U21	Friendly	United States U21, Japan U21	5 & 8 June 2026	
26	(Republic of Ireland) Oisin Gallagher	Republic of Ireland U21	Friendly	Croatia U21, Qatar U21	6 & 9 June 2026	
27	(Republic of Ireland) Chiedozie Ogbene	Republic of Ireland	2026–27 UEFA Nations League	Kosovo, Israel, Austria, Israel	24 & 27 September, 1 & 4 October 2026	
24	(Ukraine) Ivan Varfolomeev	Ukraine	2026–27 UEFA Nations League	Hungary, (Georgia (country)) Georgia, Northern Ireland, Hungary	25 & 28 September, 2 & 5 October 2026	
4	(Romania) Andrei Coubiș	Romania	2026–27 UEFA Nations League	Sweden, Bosnia and Herzegovina, Poland, Sweden	25 & 28 September, 2 & 5 October 2026	
26	(Turkey) Yunus Konak	Türkiye U21	2027 UEFA European Under-21 Championship qualification	Ukraine U21, Hungary U21	26 September & 6 October 2026	
7	(Saint Lucia) Reeco Hackett	Saint Lucia	2026–27 CONCACAF Nations League B	Bermuda, Barbados	13 & 17 November 2026	
26	(Turkey) Yunus Konak	Türkiye U21	2027 UEFA European Under-21 Championship qualification	(Czech Republic) Czechia U21, (Czech Republic) Czechia U21	13 & 17 November 2026	
46	(Australia) Joe Gauci	Australia	Friendly	Qatar, Jordan	13 & 17 November 2026	
24	(Ukraine) Ivan Varfolomeev	Ukraine	2026–27 UEFA Nations League	Northern Ireland, (Georgia (country)) Georgia	14 & 17 November 2026	
4	(Romania) Andrei Coubiș	Romania	2026–27 UEFA Nations League	Poland, Bosnia and Herzegovina	14 & 17 November 2026	
27	(Republic of Ireland) Chiedozie Ogbene	Republic of Ireland	2026–27 UEFA Nations League	Austria, Kosovo	14 & 17 November 2026	

== Coaching staff ==
The first team coaching structure saw change in the summer, with Michael Skubala joining Championship side Bristol City, and replaced by Chris Cohen and Tom Shaw as joint head-coach. They added Paul McShane as a first team coach, with goalkeeping and set play coach David Preece, head of medical Kieran Walker, head of performance Josh Snowden and head of recruitment Joe Hutchinson all committing their future. In September, Shaun Pearson joined the club as a first team coach.

In the academy, PDP lead coach, Sam Tillen left the club after 3.5 years.

As of 16 September 2026

Role	Name
Head Coach	(England) Chris Cohen
Head Coach	(England) Tom Shaw
Coach	(Republic of Ireland) Paul McShane
Coach	(England) Shaun Pearson
Goalkeeping Coach	(England) David Preece

== Pre-season and friendlies ==
On 26 May, Lincoln City confirmed two friendlies, the first against Boston United, before a training camp in Spain where they face Leyton Orient. Two more friendlies against Grimsby Town and Doncaster Rovers were announced on 1 June. Their summer schedule was finalised with a fixture against Barnsley confirmed on 8 June. They returned to pre-season training on 26 June for testing, before full training on Monday 29th.

11 July 2026 Friendly	Boston United	0–1	Lincoln City	Boston
15:00 BST		Report	Bayliss 7'	Stadium: Jakemans Community Stadium; Attendance: 1,643; Referee: Aaron Bannister

17 July 2026 Friendly	Leyton Orient	2–0	Lincoln City	San Pedro del Pinatar, Murcia, Spain
16:00 BST	74'; Mitchell 89'			Stadium: Pinatar Arena

25 July 2026 Friendly	Lincoln City	3–0	Mansfield Town	Scampton
	Moylan; Jefferies; Parks			Stadium: Elite Performance Centre; Attendance: 0 (Behind-closed-doors)
Note: match consisted of two 60 minutes periods

28 July 2026 Friendly	Grimsby Town	5–1	Lincoln City	Cleethorpes
19:00 BST	Walker 21'; Vernam 28'; Amaluzor 39'; Cook 82', 86'	Report	Jefferies 69'	Stadium: Blundell Park

1 August 2026 Friendly	Doncaster Rovers	0–1	Lincoln City	Doncaster
15:00 BST		Report	Thorn 49'	Stadium: Club Doncaster Sports Village; Attendance: 2,455

1 August 2026 Friendly	Barnsley	3–0	Lincoln City	Barnsley
19:00 BST	Kelly 3'; Kirk 45+2'; Earl (red card) 76'; Cleary 89'	Report		Stadium: Oakwell

== Competitions ==
=== Championship ===
==== League table ====
Pos	Team	Pld	W	D	L	GF	GA	GD	Pts	Promotion, qualification or relegation
18	Bristol City	16	5	3	8	16	26	−10	18	
19	Charlton Athletic	16	4	5	7	14	25	−11	17	
20	Lincoln City	16	4	3	9	15	27	−12	15	
21	Watford	16	4	3	9	13	27	−14	15	
22	Burnley	16	1	8	7	24	33	−9	11	Relegation to EFL League One

Updated to match(es) played on 22 November 2026. Source: EFL Official Website
Rules for classification: 1) Points; 2) Goal difference; 3) Number of goals scored; 4) Head-to-head results; 5) Wins; 6) Away goals; 7) Penalty points (sec 9.5); 8) Number of 12-point sending off offences; 9) Play-off (only if needed to determine promotion/relegation)

==== Results summary ====
Overall								Home						Away					
Pld	W	D	L	GF	GA	GD	Pts	W	D	L	GF	GA	GD	W	D	L	GF	GA	GD
16	4	3	9	15	27	−12	15	1	2	5	8	17	−9	3	1	4	7	10	−3

Last updated: 21 November 2026.
Source: Soccerway

==== Results by round ====
Round	1	2	3	4	5	7	6^{1}	8	9	10	11	12	13	14	15	16
Ground	A	H	A	H	H	A	A	H	A	H	A	H	H	A	A	H
Result	L	L	W	D	D	W	W	L	L	L	D	W	L	L	L	L
Position	18	20	17	17	17	16	8	12	16	18	18	15	16	19	21	20
Points	0	0	3	4	5	8	11	11	11	11	12	15	15	15	15	15

Updated to match(es) played on 21 November 2026. Source: [ Soccerway]
A = Away; H = Home; W = Win; D = Draw; L = Loss; P = Postponed
Notes:
- ^{1} Matchday 6 (vs Bristol City) was moved due to Lincoln's involvement in the EFL Cup.

==== Matches ====
On 25 June 2026, the EFL Championship fixtures were revealed.

15 August 2026 1	Middlesbrough	2–1	Lincoln City	Middlesbrough
15:00 BST	Lankshear 62', 90+1'	Report	Reach 12'; Draper (yellow card) 36'; Olaofe (yellow card) 89'	Stadium: Riverside Stadium; Attendance: 31,487; Referee: Robert Madley
Note: Live on Sky Sports

22 August 2026 2	Lincoln City	1–3	Portsmouth	Lincoln
12:30 BST	Hackett 32' (pen.); Draper (yellow card) 34'; Bayliss (yellow card) 68'; Hamer (yellow card) 71'	Report	Kavuma-McQueen 7'; Segečić 16'; Shein (yellow card) 55'; Adams 69'	Stadium: ProAmpac Stadium; Attendance: 10,545; Referee: Tony Harrington
Note: Live on Sky Sports

29 August 2026 3	Bolton Wanderers	0–1	Lincoln City	Horwich
15:00 BST		Report	House (yellow card) 30', (goal) 66'; Varfolomeev (yellow card) 79'; McGrandles (yellow card) 90+3'	Stadium: Toughsheet Community Stadium; Attendance: 21,581; Referee: Ben Speedie

1 September 2026 4	Lincoln City	0–0	Blackburn Rovers	Lincoln
19:45 BST	McGrandles (yellow card) 90+4'	Report	Atcheson (yellow card) 13' (yellow-red card) 69'; Garrett (yellow card) 85'; Forshaw (yellow card) 90+5'	Stadium: ProAmpac Stadium; Attendance: 10,267; Referee: Will Finnie
Note: Live on Sky Sports

5 September 2026 5	Lincoln City	1–1	Southampton	Lincoln
12:30 BST	McGrandles (yellow card) 43'; Varfolomeev (yellow card) 56'; Draper (yellow card) 75'; Ladefoged 87'	Report	Welington 44'	Stadium: ProAmpac Stadium; Attendance: 10,758; Referee: Andrew Kitchen
Note: Live on Sky Sports

12 September 2026 7	Preston North End	0–1	Lincoln City	Preston
15:00 BST	Clarke (yellow card) 54'	Report	Draper 81'; Jefferies (yellow card) 86'	Stadium: Deepdale; Attendance: 14,702; Referee: Stephen Martin

15 September 2026 6	Bristol City	0–1	Lincoln City	Bristol
19:45 BST	Eissat (yellow card) 28'; Tolaj (yellow card) 41'	Report	House (yellow card) 14'; Elerewe (yellow card) 37'; Draper (yellow card) 45', (goal) 53'; Towler (yellow card) 68'; Wickens (yellow card) 69'	Stadium: Ashton Gate; Attendance: 18,666; Referee: Tim Robinson
Note: Live on Sky Sports

19 September 2026 8	Lincoln City	1–2	Swansea City	Lincoln
15:00 BST	House (yellow card) 6'; Towler (yellow card) 25'; Hackett 39' (pen.)	Report	Yeo 47'; Eustáquio 51'; Lissah (yellow card) 90'	Stadium: ProAmpac Stadium; Attendance: 10,559; Referee: Anthony Backhouse

10 October 2026 9	Sheffield United	3–0	Lincoln City	Sheffield
15:00 BST	McCallum (yellow card) 15'; Kitching (yellow card) 39'; Bamford 43', 77'; Chong 52'; Tanganga (yellow card) 67'; Peck (yellow card) 75'	Report	McGrandles (yellow card) 26'; Elerewe (yellow card) 67'; Bayliss (yellow card) 76'	Stadium: Bramall Lane; Attendance: 27,180; Referee: Josh Smith

14 October 2026 10	Lincoln City	0–6	West Ham United	Lincoln
20:00 BST	Hamer (red card) 3'; McGrandles (red card) 23'	Report	Mavropanos 45', (yellow card) 51'; Austbø 48'; Bowen 50'; Pablo 75', (yellow card) 90+1'; Souček 79', 89'	Stadium: ProAmpac Stadium; Attendance: 10,605; Referee: Andrew Kitchen
Note: Live on Sky Sports

17 October 2026 11	Millwall	2–2	Lincoln City	New Cross
12:30 BST	Crama (yellow card) 35'; Lisbie 63', (yellow card) 72'; Cooper (yellow card) 48', (goal) 82'; Sturge (yellow card) 86'; Leonard (yellow card) 90+1'; Neghli (yellow card) 90+2'	Report	Coubiș 1', (yellow card) 69'; Street 33', (yellow card) 35'; Draper (yellow card) 41'; Elerewe (red card) 84'; Elder (yellow card) 90+1'	Stadium: The Den; Attendance: 19,834; Referee: Ruebyn Ricardo
Note: Live on Sky Sports

24 October 2026 12	Lincoln City	4–1	Burnley	Lincoln
15:00 BST	House 45+3', (yellow card) 73'; Ladefoged 49', 67'; Jefferies 57'	Report	Hountondji 39'; Coudert (yellow card) 67'; Edwards (penalty missed) 84'	Stadium: ProAmpac Stadium; Attendance: 10,558; Referee: Thomas Parsons

31 October 2026 13	Lincoln City	1–3	Birmingham City	Lincoln
12:30 GMT	Ladefoged (yellow card) 25'; Jefferies (yellow card) 42'; Bayliss 63'; Konak (yellow card) 89'	Report	Priske 16', 60'; Millar (yellow card) 27'; Laird (yellow card) 32'; Cochrane 73'	Stadium: ProAmpac Stadium; Attendance: 10,551; Referee: Lewis Smith
Note: Live on Sky Sports

3 November 2026 14	Watford	1–0	Lincoln City	Watford
19:45 GMT	Mavididi 46', (yellow card) 50'; Keben (yellow card) 56'; Mlačić (yellow card) 80'; Kayembe (yellow card) 88'; Kyprianou (yellow card) 90'	Report	House (yellow card) 57'; Bradley (yellow card) 88'	Stadium: Vicarage Road; Attendance: 15,641; Referee: James Bell
Note: Live on Sky Sports

7 November 2026 15	Queens Park Rangers	2–1	Lincoln City	Shepherd's Bush
15:00 GMT	Smyth (yellow card) 8'; Kone 11'; Kamara 80'; Cirkin (yellow card) 90+3'	Report	McGrandles (yellow card) 1'; Jefferies 29'; Konak (yellow card) 33'	Stadium: MATRADE Loftus Road Stadium; Attendance: 17,478; Referee: Robert Madley

21 November 2026 16	Lincoln City	0–1	Wrexham	Lincoln
15:00 GMT	Oyegoke (yellow card) 51'	Report	Thomason 82'	Stadium: ProAmpac Stadium; Attendance: 10,165; Referee: Edward Duckworth

24 November 2026 17	Charlton Athletic	v	Lincoln City	Charlton
19:45 GMT				Stadium: The Valley
Note: Live on Sky Sports

28 November 2026 18	Lincoln City	v	Wolverhampton Wanderers	Lincoln
12:30 GMT				Stadium: ProAmpac Stadium
Note: Live on Sky Sports

5 December 2026 19	Cardiff City	v	Lincoln City	Cardiff
15:00 GMT				Stadium: Cardiff City Stadium

9 December 2026 20	Lincoln City	v	Stoke City	Lincoln
19:45 GMT				Stadium: ProAmpac Stadium
Note: Live on Sky Sports

13 December 2026 21	Lincoln City	v	Norwich City	Lincoln
14:00 GMT				Stadium: ProAmpac Stadium
Note: Live on Sky Sports

19 December 2026 22	Derby County	v	Lincoln City	Derby
15:00 GMT				Stadium: Pride Park Stadium

26 December 2026 23	Lincoln City	v	West Bromwich Albion	Lincoln
15:00 GMT				Stadium: ProAmpac Stadium
Note: Live on Sky Sports

29 December 2026 24	Burnley	v	Lincoln City	Burnley
19:45 GMT				Stadium: Turf Moor
Note: Live on Sky Sports

1 January 2027 25	Norwich City	v	Lincoln City	Norwich
15:00 GMT				Stadium: Carrow Road
Note: Live on Sky Sports

16 January 2027 26	Lincoln City	v	Millwall	Lincoln
15:00 GMT				Stadium: ProAmpac Stadium

23 January 2027 27	Birmingham City	v	Lincoln City	Birmingham
12:30 GMT				Stadium: St. Andrew's @ Knighthead Park
Note: Live on Sky Sports

26 January 2027 28	Lincoln City	v	Watford	Lincoln
19:45 GMT				Stadium: ProAmpac Stadium
Note: Live on Sky Sports

29 January 2027 29	Lincoln City	v	Queens Park Rangers	Lincoln
20:00 GMT				Stadium: ProAmpac Stadium
Note: Live on Sky Sports

6 February 2027 30	Wrexham	v	Lincoln City	Wrexham
12:30 GMT				Stadium: Racecourse Ground
Note: Live on Sky Sports

13 February 2027 31	Lincoln City	v	Preston North End	Lincoln
17:30 GMT				Stadium: ProAmpac Stadium
Note: Live on Sky Sports

16 February 2027 32	West Ham United	v	Lincoln City	Stratford
19:45 GMT				Stadium: London Stadium
Note: Live on Sky Sports

20 February 2027 33	Swansea City	v	Lincoln City	Swansea
15:00 GMT				Stadium: Swansea.com Stadium

27 February 2027 34	Lincoln City	v	Sheffield United	Lincoln
15:00 GMT				Stadium: ProAmpac Stadium

3 March 2027 35	Portsmouth	v	Lincoln City	Portsmouth
20:00 GMT				Stadium: Fratton Park
Note: Live on Sky Sports

6 March 2027 36	Lincoln City	v	Middlesbrough	Lincoln
15:00 GMT				Stadium: ProAmpac Stadium

13 March 2027 37	Wolverhampton Wanderers	v	Lincoln City	Wolverhampton
15:00 GMT				Stadium: Molineux Stadium

16 March 2027 38	Lincoln City	v	Cardiff City	Lincoln
19:45 GMT				Stadium: ProAmpac Stadium
Note: Live on Sky Sports

20 March 2027 39	West Bromwich Albion	v	Lincoln City	West Bromwich
15:00 GMT				Stadium: The Hawthorns

3 April 2027 40	Lincoln City	v	Derby County	Lincoln
15:00 BST				Stadium: ProAmpac Stadium

6 April 2027 41	Lincoln City	v	Bristol City	Lincoln
19:45 BST				Stadium: ProAmpac Stadium
Note: Live on Sky Sports

10 April 2027 42	Southampton	v	Lincoln City	Southampton
15:00 BST				Stadium: St Mary's Stadium

17 April 2027 43	Lincoln City	v	Bolton Wanderers	Lincoln
15:00 BST				Stadium: ProAmpac Stadium

21 April 2027 44	Blackburn Rovers	v	Lincoln City	Blackburn
19:45 BST				Stadium: Ewood Park
Note: Live on Sky Sports

24 April 2027 45	Stoke City	v	Lincoln City	Stoke-on-Trent
15:00 BST				Stadium: Bet365 Stadium

1 May 2027 46	Lincoln City	v	Charlton Athletic	Lincoln
12:30 BST				Stadium: ProAmpac Stadium
Note: Live on Sky Sports

=== EFL Cup ===
On 25 June, the draw for the first round was made, with Lincoln City being drawn away against Derby County. The second round was drawn on 10 August 2026, with Lincoln being drawn away to Blackpool. The third round was drawn on 26 August, with Lincoln getting a third away tie against Premier League club Bournemouth.

8 August 2026 First round	Derby County	1–2	Lincoln City	Derby
15:00 BST	Travis (yellow card) 35'; Szmodics 45+1'	Report	House 3', (yellow card) 48'; Jefferies 23'; Reach (yellow card) 32'	Stadium: Pride Park Stadium; Attendance: 11,095; Referee: Josh Smith
Note: Live on Sky Sports

25 August 2026 Second round	Blackpool	1–4	Lincoln City	Blackpool
19:45 BST	Ashworth (yellow card) 31' (yellow-red card) 52'; Clarkson 45'; Bowler (yellow card) 57'; Coulson (yellow card) 60'	Report	Melia (yellow card) 35'; Olaofe 36'; Bayliss 53'; Street 55'; Elder 77'	Stadium: Bloomfield Road; Attendance: 2,407; Referee: Harry Wager
Note: Live on Sky Sports

8 September 2026 Third round	Bournemouth	4–0	Lincoln City	Bournemouth
19:45 BST	Christie 7', 69', 88'; Kluivert (yellow card) 41'; Silva (yellow card) 61'; Rayan 90+4'	Report	Elder (yellow card) 27'; Jefferies (yellow card) 48'; Oyegoke (yellow card) 67'	Stadium: Vitality Stadium; Attendance: 10,090; Referee: Elliot Bell
Note: Live on Sky Sports

== Transfers & contracts ==
=== In ===
Date	Pos	Player	From	Fee	Ref
1 July 2026 (Note: The transfer was announced on 29 June, and would become official on July 1 once his Derby County contract expired)	LB	(Australia) Callum Elder	(England) Derby County	Free	
25 July 2026	CB	(Romania) Andrei Coubiș	(Romania) Universitatea Cluj	Undisclosed (Note: Total fee including add-ons to be £2,600,000 with Universitatea Cluj holding a 15% sell-on clause)	
30 August 2026	CF	(Denmark) Mikkel Ladefoged	(Sweden) Västerås SK	Undisclosed	
1 September 2026	RB	(England) Daniel Oyegoke	(Italy) Hellas Verona	Undisclosed	

=== Out ===
Date	Pos	Player	To	Fee	Ref
4 July 2026	LW	(Sweden) Erik Ring	(Scotland) Kilmarnock	Undisclosed	
27 July 2026	CM	(Northern Ireland) JJ McKiernan	(England) Bromley	Undisclosed	
5 August 2026	AM	(Republic of Ireland) Jack Moylan	(Wales) Cardiff City	Undisclosed	

=== Loaned in ===
Date	Pos	Player	Loaned from	Date until	Ref
28 July 2026	GK	(Australia) Joe Gauci	(England) Aston Villa	End of season	
5 August 2026	CF	(Republic of Ireland) Mason Melia	(England) Tottenham Hotspur	End of season	
7 August 2026	CF	(England) Tanto Olaofe	(England) Charlton Athletic	End of season	
18 August 2026	DM	(Turkey) Yunus Konak	(England) Brentford	End of season	
24 August 2026	CF	(England) Ethan Wheatley	(England) Manchester United	End of season	
1 September 2026	RW	(Republic of Ireland) Chiedozie Ogbene	(England) Ipswich Town	1 January 2027	

=== Loaned out ===
Date	Pos	Player	Loaned to	Date until	Ref
15 June 2026 (Note: The loan was announced on 11 June, and would become official once the transfer window opened on 15 June)	GK	(England) Zach Jeacock	(England) Northampton Town	End of season	
21 July 2026	RW	(United States) Zane Okoro	(England) Tranmere Rovers	End of season	
21 July 2026	CM	(Republic of Ireland) Oisin Gallagher	(England) Barnet	End of season	
7 August 2026	RW	(England) Oscar Thorn	(England) Colchester United	End of season	
1 September 2026	CF	(Republic of Ireland) James Collins	(England) Doncaster Rovers	1 January 2027	
21 September 2026	GK	(England) Jaden Taylor	(England) Armthorpe Welfare	17 October 2026	

=== Released / Out of Contract ===
Date	Pos	Player	Subsequent club	Join date	Ref
30 June 2026	CB	(England) Charlie Carlisle	(England) North Ferriby	1 July 2026	
30 June 2026	CB	(England) MJ Kamson-Kamara	(Scotland) Heart of Midlothian	1 July 2026	
30 June 2026	CF	(England) Daniel Vanderpuye	(England) Boston United	1 July 2026	
30 June 2026	CM	(England) Josh Blant	(England) Lincoln United	12 July 2026	
30 June 2026	LB	(Wales) Noah Simmons	(England) Ilkeston Town	3 August 2026	
3 September 2026	CB	(England) Adam Jackson	(England) Bromley	21 September 2026	
30 June 2026	CB	(England) Orin Aldridge			

=== New contract ===
Date	Pos	Player	Length	Expiry	Ref
17 June 2026	GK	(England) Jamie Pardington	2 years	30 June 2028	
21 July 2026	RW	(United States) Zane Okoro	3 years	30 June 2029	
21 July 2026	CM	(Republic of Ireland) Oisin Gallagher	3 years	30 June 2029 (Note: Club option of an additional year)	
22 July 2026	CB	(England) Ryley Towler	4 years	30 June 2030	
22 July 2026	CM	(Scotland) Conor McGrandles	2 years	30 June 2028	
22 July 2026	GK	(England) George Wickens	3 years	30 June 2029	
5 August 2026	CF	(England) Freddie Draper	4 years	30 June 2030	
5 August 2026	RW	(Saint Lucia) Reeco Hackett	3 years	30 June 2029	
5 August 2026	CM	(Wales) Dom Jefferies	2 years	30 June 2028	
23 September 2026	DM	(Ukraine) Ivan Varfolomeev	4 years	30 June 2030	
8 October 2026	RB	(Zimbabwe) Tendayi Darikwa	2 years	30 June 2028	
22 October 2026	LB	(England) Adam Reach	One-year option	30 June 2028	

== Squad statistics ==
=== Appearances ===
As of 21 November 2026

No.	Pos	Nat	Player	Total		Championship		FA Cup		EFL Cup	
No.	Pos	Nat	Player	Apps	Goals	Apps	Goals	Apps	Goals	Apps	Goals
1	GK	(England) ENG	George Wickens	17	0	16	0	0	0	1	0
2	DF	(Zimbabwe) ZIM	Tendayi Darikwa	3	0	2	0	0	0	1	0
3	DF	(England) ENG	Adam Reach	16	1	14+1	1	0	0	1	0
4	DF	(Romania) ROU	Andrei Coubiș	14	1	8+4	1	0	0	1+1	0
6	DF	(England) ENG	Ryley Towler	14	0	7+4	0	0	0	2+1	0
7	MF	(Saint Lucia) LCA	Reeco Hackett	17	2	9+5	2	0	0	1+2	0
8	MF	(England) ENG	Tom Bayliss	16	2	6+8	1	0	0	2	1
10	FW	(Republic of Ireland) IRL	Mason Melia	4	0	0+2	0	0	0	1+1	0
11	FW	(Denmark) DEN	Mikkel Ladefoged	10	3	3+6	3	0	0	1	0
14	MF	(Scotland) SCO	Conor McGrandles	13	0	12	0	0	0	1	0
15	DF	(England) ENG	Sonny Bradley	13	0	12	0	0	0	0+1	0
16	MF	(Wales) WAL	Dom Jefferies	16	3	10+3	2	0	0	2+1	1
17	FW	(England) ENG	Rob Street	19	2	6+10	1	0	0	2+1	1
18	FW	(Scotland) SCO	Ben House	15	3	13	2	0	0	1+1	1
19	FW	(England) ENG	Tanto Olaofe	8	1	0+6	0	0	0	1+1	1
20	DF	(Australia) AUS	Callum Elder	10	1	5+2	0	0	0	2+1	1
22	DF	(England) ENG	Tom Hamer	8	0	3+4	0	0	0	1	0
23	DF	(Republic of Ireland) IRL	Josh Honohan	3	0	0+1	0	0	0	2	0
24	MF	(Ukraine) UKR	Ivan Varfolomeev	13	0	8+3	0	0	0	1+1	0
25	DF	(England) ENG	Deji Elerewe	18	0	16	0	0	0	1+1	0
26	MF	(Turkey) TUR	Yunus Konak	11	0	5+4	0	0	0	2	0
27	FW	(Republic of Ireland) IRL	Chiedozie Ogbene	12	0	3+8	0	0	0	1	0
29	FW	(England) ENG	Ethan Wheatley	2	0	1	0	0	0	0+1	0
33	DF	(England) ENG	Daniel Oyegoke	9	0	5+3	0	0	0	1	0
34	FW	(England) ENG	Freddie Draper	16	2	12+2	2	0	0	1+1	0
46	GK	(Australia) AUS	Joe Gauci	2	0	0	0	0	0	2	0
Players that left the club mid-season:
5	DF	(England) ENG	Adam Jackson	1	0	0	0	0	0	1	0

=== Goalscorers ===
As of 21 November 2026

Rank	Pos.	Nat.	No.	Player	Championship	FA Cup	EFL Cup	Total
1	FW	(Denmark)	11	Mikkel Ladefoged	3	0	0	3
1	MF	(Wales)	16	Dom Jefferies	2	0	1	3
1	FW	(Scotland)	18	Ben House	2	0	1	3
2	MF	(Saint Lucia)	7	Reeco Hackett	2	0	0	2
2	MF	(England)	8	Tom Bayliss	1	0	1	2
2	FW	(England)	17	Rob Street	1	0	1	2
2	FW	(England)	34	Freddie Draper	2	0	0	2
3	DF	(England)	3	Adam Reach	1	0	0	1
3	DF	(Romania)	4	Andrei Coubiș	1	0	0	1
3	FW	(England)	19	Tanto Olaofe	0	0	1	1
3	DF	(Australia)	20	Callum Elder	0	0	1	1
Total					15	0	6	21

=== Assists ===
As of 21 November 2026

Rank	Pos.	Nat.	No.	Player	Championship	FA Cup	EFL Cup	Total
1	DF	(Romania)	4	Andrei Coubiș	2	0	0	2
1	MF	(Scotland)	18	Ben House	2	0	0	2
1	DF	(Australia)	20	Callum Elder	1	0	1	2
1	FW	(England)	34	Freddie Draper	1	0	1	2
2	DF	(Zimbabwe)	2	Tendayi Darikwa	1	0	0	1
2	MF	(Saint Lucia)	7	Reeco Hackett	1	0	0	1
2	MF	(England)	8	Tom Bayliss	0	0	1	1
2	FW	(Denmark)	11	Mikkel Ladefoged	1	0	0	1
2	DF	(England)	15	Sonny Bradley	1	0	0	1
2	DF	(Republic of Ireland)	23	Josh Honohan	0	0	1	1
2	MF	(Ukraine)	24	Ivan Varfolomeev	0	0	1	1
Total					10	0	5	17

=== Disciplinary record ===
As of 21 November 2026

No.	Pos.	Player	Championship		FA Cup		EFL Cup		Total	
No.	Pos.	Player	Yellow card	Red card	Yellow card	Red card	Yellow card	Red card	Yellow card	Red card
1	GK	George Wickens	1	0	0	0	0	0	1	0
3	DF	Adam Reach	0	0	0	0	1	0	1	0
4	DF	Andrei Coubiș	1	0	0	0	0	0	1	0
6	DF	Ryley Towler	2	0	0	0	0	0	2	0
8	MF	Tom Bayliss	2	0	0	0	0	0	2	0
10	FW	Mason Melia	0	0	0	0	1	0	1	0
11	FW	Mikkel Ladefoged	1	0	0	0	0	0	1	0
14	MF	Conor McGrandles	5	1	0	0	0	0	5	1
15	DF	Sonny Bradley	1	0	0	0	0	0	1	0
16	MF	Dom Jefferies	2	0	0	0	1	0	3	0
17	FW	Rob Street	1	0	0	0	0	0	1	0
18	FW	Ben House	5	0	0	0	1	0	6	0
19	FW	Tanto Olaofe	1	0	0	0	0	0	1	0
20	DF	Callum Elder	1	0	0	0	1	0	2	0
22	DF	Tom Hamer	1	1	0	0	0	0	1	1
24	MF	Ivan Varfolomeev	2	0	0	0	0	0	2	0
25	DF	Deji Elerewe	2	1	0	0	0	0	2	1
26	MF	Yunus Konak	2	0	0	0	0	0	2	0
33	DF	Daniel Oyegoke	1	0	0	0	1	0	2	0
34	FW	Freddie Draper	5	0	0	0	0	0	5	0

=== Clean sheets ===
As of 21 November 2026

No.	Nat.	Player	Matches played	Clean sheet %	Championship	FA Cup	EFL Cup	Total
1	(England)	George Wickens	17	23.53%	4	0	0	4
46	(Australia)	Joe Gauci	2	0%	0	0	0	0

== Awards ==
=== EFL awards ===
==== EFL League One Manager of the Month ====
Month	Manager	Result	Ref.
September	(England) Chris Cohen & Tom Shaw	Nominated	
