= Mads Agger =

Danish footballer (born 1999)

Personal information
- Date of birth: 21 December 1999 (age 26)
- Place of birth: Holstebro, Denmark
- Height: 1.81 m (5 ft 11 in)
- Positions: Right winger; forward

Team information
- Current team: BK Häcken (on loan from Pogoń Szczecin)

Senior career*
Years	Team	Apps	(Gls)
201?–2020	Lemvig GF		
2020–2022	Skive	59	(14)
2022–2023	Næstved	29	(6)
2023–2026	Sønderjyske	78	(20)
2026–	Pogoń Szczecin	13	(1)
2026–	→ BK Häcken (loan)	7	(0)
- * Club domestic league appearances and goals as of 23:04, 1 November 2026 (UTC)

Mads Agger (born 21 December 1999) is a Danish professional footballer who plays as a right winger or forward for Allsvenskan club BK Häcken, on loan from Pogoń Szczecin.

== Club career ==
Born in the Central Jutland city of Holstebro, Agger played amateur football for Lemvig GF in the eighth tier of Danish football. He received his first professional contract in 2020, signing for Skive IK who were competing in the Danish 1st Division at the time. Both he and the club struggled in his debut season, as they were relegated to the 2nd Division. He managed three goals after 27 appearances during the season. He found the back of the net 11 times in 32 league appearances in the following season.

In 2022, Agger was signed by Næstved BK of the 1st Division. He would spend only one season at Næstved Stadium, scoring nine goals over 32 appearances. His performances caught the attention of fellow 1st Division club Sønderjyske, who signed him on 19 June 2023 on a three-year contract. His first season with the club would prove to be successful, as Sønderjyske won the 1st Division title to gain promotion to the Danish Superliga. During their promotion campaign, Agger provided nine goals and five assists over 32 appearances in both the league and the Danish Cup.

On 11 August 2024, Agger made his first appearance in the top flight of Danish football, coming on the 39th minute as a substitute as Sønderjyske fell 0–2 to Copenhagen at Sydbank Park. Just one week later on 18 August, he gave Sønderjyske a 2–1 victory at Randers FC where he scored both goals for the club. His debut season in the top league finished with eight goals from 26 matches played as Sønderjyske finished 9th in the league table.

On 25 February 2026, Agger moved abroad for the first time in his career, joining Polish club Pogoń Szczecin until June 2029 with an option for a further year. On 31 August 2026, he was sent on a four-month loan to Swedish club BK Häcken, with an option to make the move permanent.

== Personal life ==
Mads is the younger brother of professional footballer Mikkel Agger, who spent much of his career with Thisted before retiring in 2024. Their father, Søren Agger, also spent time in professional football for Herning Fremad.

== Career statistics ==
As of match played 1 November 2026

Appearances and goals by club, season and competition
Club	Season	League			National cup (Note: Includes Danish Cup)		Other		Total	
Club	Season	Division	Apps	Goals	Apps	Goals	Apps	Goals	Apps	Goals
Skive	2020–21	Danish 1st Division	27	3	2	1	0	0	29	4
Skive	2021–22	Danish 2nd Division	32	11	1	0	0	0	33	11
Skive	Total		59	14	3	1	0	0	62	15
Næstved	2022–23	Danish 1st Division	29	6	3	3	0	0	32	9
Sønderjyske	2023–24	Danish 1st Division	31	9	1	0	0	0	32	9
Sønderjyske	2024–25	Danish Superliga	26	8	2	1	0	0	28	9
Sønderjyske	2025–26	Danish Superliga	21	3	1	0	—		22	3
Sønderjyske	Total		78	20	4	1	0	0	82	21
Pogoń Szczecin	2025–26	Ekstraklasa	12	1	—		—		12	1
Pogoń Szczecin	2026–27	Ekstraklasa	1	0	—		—		1	0
Pogoń Szczecin	Total		13	1	—		—		13	1
BK Häcken (loan)	2026	Allsvenskan	7	0	0	0	—		7	0
Career total			186	41	10	5	0	0	196	46

== Honours ==
Sønderjyske

- Danish 1st Division: 2023–24
