= Yunus Emre Konak =

Turkish footballer (born 2006)

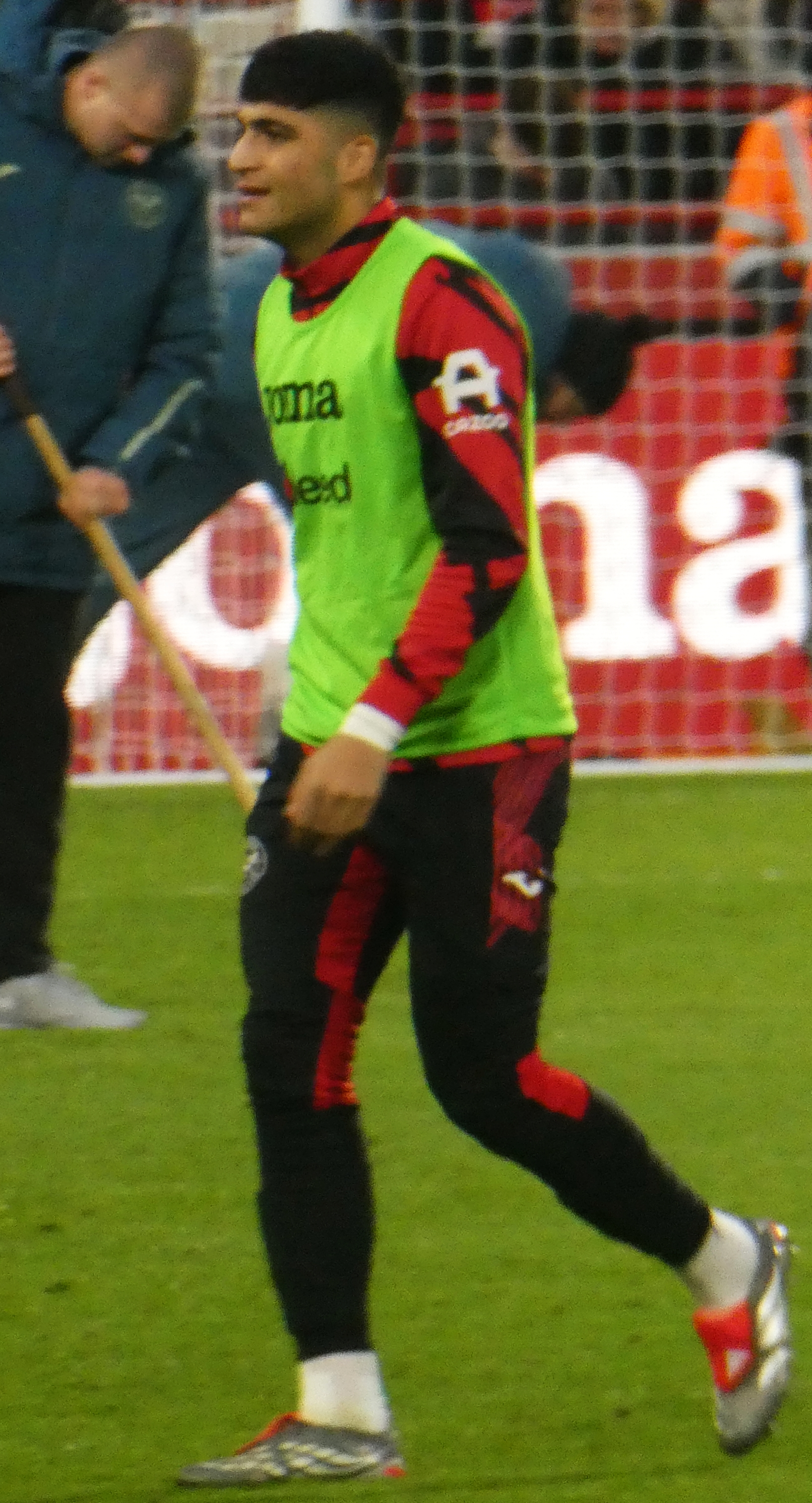
- Konak warming up for Brentford in 2025.

Personal information
- Full name: Yunus Emre Konak
- Date of birth: 10 January 2006 (age 20)
- Place of birth: Batman, Turkey
- Height: 1.81 m (5 ft 11 in)
- Position: Defensive midfielder

Team information
- Current team: Lincoln City (on loan from Brentford)
- Number: 26

Youth career
- 2016–2018: Batman Tüpraşspor
- 2018: 1955 Batman Belediyespor
- 2018–2023: Sivasspor

Senior career*
Years	Team	Apps	(Gls)
2023–2024	Sivasspor	17	(0)
2024–	Brentford	10	(0)
2026	→ Oxford United (loan)	16	(0)
2026–	→ Lincoln City (loan)	9	(0)

International career^{‡}
2023	Turkey U18	5	(0)
2023–	Turkey U21	18	(0)
- * Club domestic league appearances and goals as of 09:13, 8 November 2026 (UTC) ‡ National team caps and goals as of 18:51, 22 November 2026 (UTC)

Yunus Emre Konak (born 10 January 2006) is a Turkish professional footballer who plays as a defensive midfielder for EFL Championship club Lincoln City on loan from Premier League club Brentford.

== Career ==
Konak is a youth product of Batman Tüpraşspor, 1955 Batman Belediyespor and Sivasspor. In March 2023, he signed his first professional contract with Sivasspor. He made his senior and professional debut with Sivasspor as a substitute in a 1–1 Süper Lig tie with Samsunspor on 18 August 2023. On 11 October 2023, he was named by English newspaper The Guardian as one of the best players born in 2006 worldwide.

=== Brentford ===
On 11 January 2024, Konak joined Premier League club Brentford, signing a five-and-a-half-year contract with an option for a further year. The Bees paid a reported €4.5 million transfer fee.

On 15 January 2026, Konak joined EFL Championship club Oxford United on loan until the end of the season.

On 18 August 2026, Konak signed a new five-year contract with Brentford, before immediately being loaned to EFL Championship club Lincoln City on loan for the duration of the 2026–27 season. He made his debut in the EFL Cup second round, starting the game against Blackpool.

== International career ==
Konak is a youth international for Turkey, having played for the country's U18s and U21s.

== Career statistics ==
=== Club ===
As of 7 November 2026

Club	Season	League			National Cup		League cup		Continental		Total	
Club	Season	League	Apps	Goals	Apps	Goals	Apps	Goals	Apps	Goals	Apps	Goals
Sivasspor	2023–24	Turkish Super League	17	0	0	0	—		—		17	0
Brentford	2023–24	Premier League	0	0	0	0	0	0	—		0	0
Brentford	2024–25	Premier League	10	0	0	0	2	0	—		12	0
Brentford	2025–26	Premier League	0	0	1	0	1	0	—		2	0
Brentford	2026–27	Premier League	0	0	0	0	0	0	—		0	0
Brentford	Total		10	0	1	0	3	0	0	0	14	0
Oxford United (loan)	2025–26	EFL Championship	16	0	—		—		—		16	0
Lincoln City (loan)	2026–27	EFL Championship	9	0	0	0	2	0	—		11	0
Career Total			52	0	1	0	5	0	0	0	58	0
