= Jannik Schuster =

Austrian footballer (born 2006)

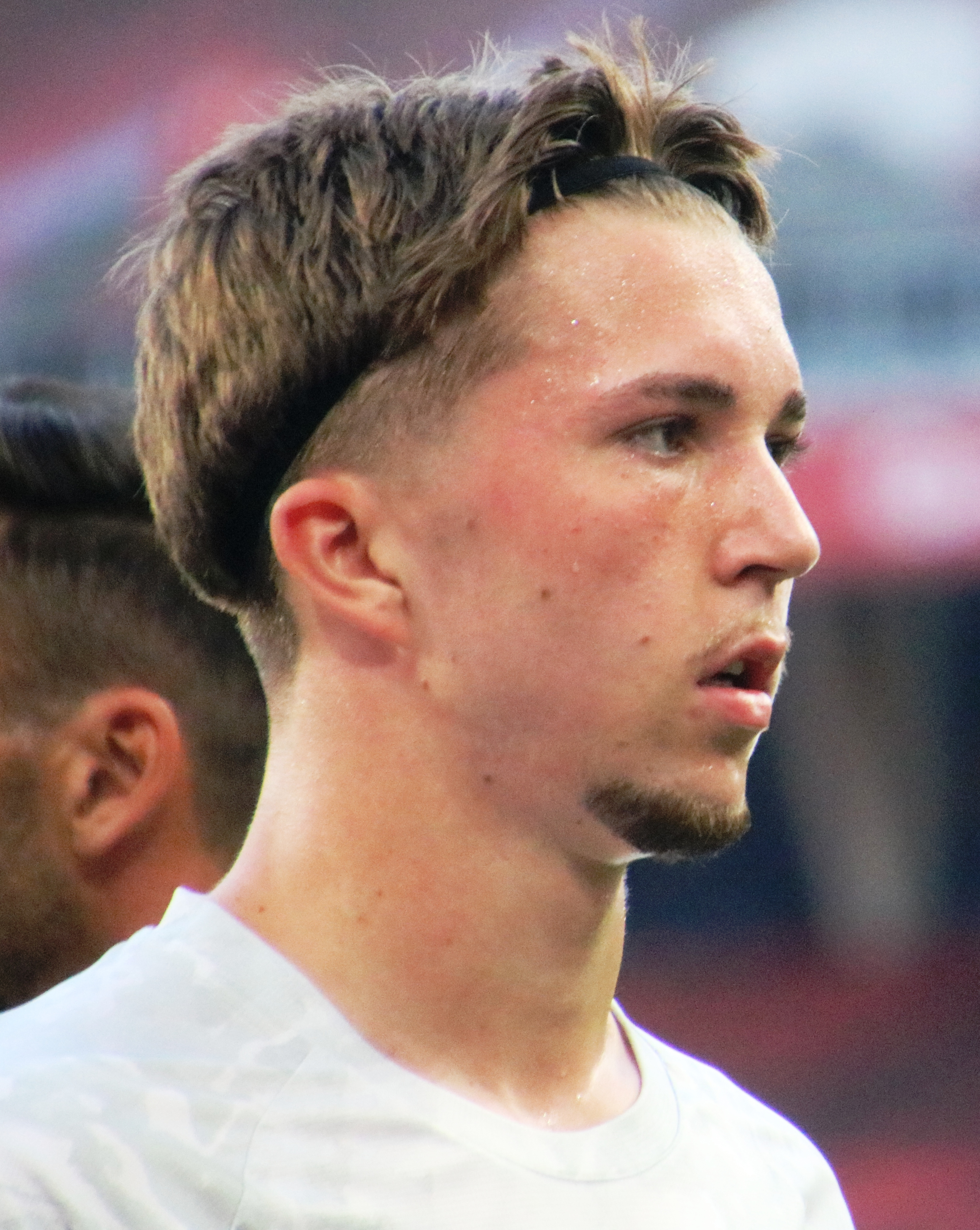
- Schuster in 2025

Personal information
- Full name: Jannik Schuster
- Date of birth: 16 May 2006 (age 20)
- Place of birth: Hall in Tirol, Austria
- Height: 1.90 m (6 ft 3 in)
- Position: Centre-back

Team information
- Current team: Brentford
- Number: 44

Youth career
- 2013–2020: SV Mieming
- 2020–2023: Red Bull Salzburg

Senior career*
| Years | Team | Apps | (Gls) |
| 2023–2025 | FC Liefering | 39 | (2) |
| 2025–2026 | Red Bull Salzburg | 21 | (1) |
| 2026– | Brentford | 4 | (0) |

International career^{‡}
| 2022 | Austria U16 | 3 | (1) |
| 2023 | Austria U18 | 3 | (0) |
| 2024–2025 | Austria U19 | 9 | (1) |
| 2025– | Austria U21 | 7 | (1) |
- * Club domestic league appearances and goals as of 10 October 2026 ‡ National team caps and goals as of 6 October 2026

Jannik Schuster (born 16 May 2006) is an Austrian professional footballer who plays as a centre-back for Premier League club Brentford.

== Club career ==
=== Red Bull Salzburg ===
Born in Hall in Tirol, Schuster is a youth product of SV Mieming and Red Bull Salzburg, he started his professional career in the 2. Liga with satellite club FC Liefering during the 2023–24 season.

Schuster made his debut with Red Bull Salzburg in a 4–2 Austrian Bundesliga win over Rapid Wien on 24 May 2025, during a 2024–25 season where he had kept impressing with FC Liefering and Salzburg's youth team, regularly wearing the captain's armband has he helped his team to a Youth League semi-final.

After being selected for the 2025 FIFA Club World Cup, whilst staying on the bench for the 3 games, he played his first UEFA Champions League game on 12 August 2025, coming on in the last few minutes of the qualifying match against Club Brugge, that the latter won 3–2, relegating the Austrian club to the UEFA Europa League.

=== Brentford ===
On 15 May 2026, Schuster joined Premier League side Brentford, signing a five-year contract until 2031 in a deal worth up to £16 million. He made his debut for the club on 25 August 2026, in a 6–1 win against Birmingham City in the EFL Cup.

== International career ==
Schuster is a youth international for Austria, having played for his country from the under-16 to the under-21.

== Personal life ==
His older brother Jonas, father, and grandfather were all ski jumpers.

== Career statistics ==
As of match played 10 October 2026

Appearances and goals by club, season and competition
| Club | Season | League | | | National cup (Note: Includes Austrian Cup) | | League cup (Note: Includes EFL Cup) | | Europe | | Other | | Total | |
| Club | Season | Division | Apps | Goals | Apps | Goals | Apps | Goals | Apps | Goals | Apps | Goals | Apps | Goals |
|---|---|---|---|---|---|---|---|---|---|---|---|---|---|---|
| FC Liefering | 2023–24 | 2. Liga | 12 | 1 | — | | — | | — | | — | | 12 | 1 |
| FC Liefering | 2024–25 | 2. Liga | 25 | 1 | — | | — | | — | | — | | 25 | 1 |
| FC Liefering | 2025–26 | 2. Liga | 2 | 0 | — | | — | | — | | — | | 2 | 0 |
| FC Liefering | Total | | 39 | 2 | 0 | 0 | 0 | 0 | 0 | 0 | 0 | 0 | 39 | 2 |
| Red Bull Salzburg | 2024–25 | Austrian Bundesliga | 1 | 0 | 0 | 0 | — | | — | | 0 | 0 | 1 | 0 |
| Red Bull Salzburg | 2025–26 | Austrian Bundesliga | 20 | 1 | 5 | 0 | — | | 4 (Note: One appearance in UEFA Champions League, three appearances in UEFA Europa League) | 0 | — | | 29 | 1 |
| Red Bull Salzburg | Total | | 21 | 1 | 5 | 0 | 0 | 0 | 4 | 0 | 0 | 0 | 30 | 1 |
| Brentford | 2026–27 | Premier League | 4 | 0 | 0 | 0 | 2 | 0 | — | | — | | 6 | 0 |
| Career total | | | 64 | 3 | 5 | 0 | 2 | 0 | 4 | 0 | 0 | 0 | 75 | 3 |
