= Joseph Gettins =

English footballer

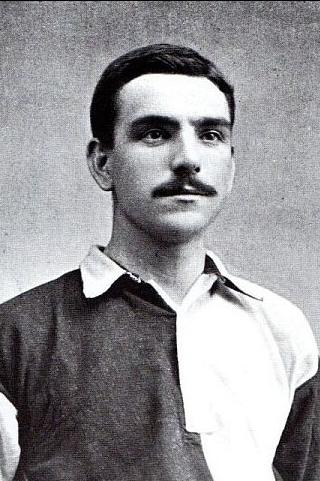
- Gettins while with Millwall Athletic in 1898

Personal information
- Full name: Joseph Holmes Gettins
- Date of birth: 19 November 1873
- Place of birth: Middlesbrough, England
- Date of death: 6 June 1954 (aged 80)
- Place of death: East Molesey, England
- Position: Centre forward

Senior career*
Years	Team	Apps	(Gls)
1894–1895	Brentford	0	(0)
- Millwall Athletic
- Middlesbrough
- Millwall Athletic
- Corinthian
- Millwall Athletic
1899	Middlesbrough	3	(0)
- Millwall Athletic
1900	Middlesbrough	3	(1)
- Millwall Athletic
1902	Middlesbrough	4	(0)
- Millwall
- * Club domestic league appearances and goals

Joseph Holmes Gettins OBE, DSO, BA (19 November 1873 – 6 June 1954) was an English amateur footballer who played as a centre forward. He is best remembered for his association with Millwall Athletic and he played in the Football League for hometown club Middlesbrough.

== Club career ==
=== Millwall Athletic ===
An amateur centre forward, Gettins' longest association was with Millwall Athletic, playing for the club in multiple spells between 1892 and 1904, by which time the club was simply known as Millwall. He scored an impressive 69 goals in 71 appearances with the club and won the 1894–95 and 1895–96 Southern League titles back to back, in addition to two United League titles and two FA Cup semi-finals.

=== Middlesbrough ===
Gettins appeared for hometown club Middlesbrough in four spells and was a part of the club's 1894–95 FA Amateur Cup-winning team. He also helped the club to the 1896–97 Northern League title and played in Middlesbrough's first ever Football League match against Lincoln City on 2 September 1899.

=== Brentford ===
Gettins had a short spell with non-League club Brentford during the 1894–95 season and his student friends inadvertently created the club's Bees nickname, by chanting Borough Road College's war-cry "buck up Bs" at a match. He made three cup appearances for the club.

== Representative career ==
Gettins was one of 14 players included in Corinthian squad which toured South Africa in 1897, the first English team to play outside Europe.

== Personal life ==
Gettins served as a captain (being promoted to a temporary major for a time) in the Royal Army Service Corps Territorial Force during the First World War. He was awarded the DSO in 1918. Before and after the war, Gettins worked in various teaching roles at Isleworth School, Borough Road College, University College, Reading and Liverpool University. In 1920, he returned to the army and became Chief Education Officer of the Army Education Corps and later commanded the Army School of Education, having risen to the rank of lieutenant colonel by the time of his retirement in 1933. Gettins was awarded an OBE in 1933.

== Career statistics ==
Appearances and goals by club, season and competition
Club	Season	League			FA Cup		Other		Total	
Club	Season	Division	Apps	Goals	Apps	Goals	Apps	Goals	Apps	Goals
Brentford	1894–95	—					3 (Note: 2 appearances in Middlesex Senior Cup, 1 appearance in West Middlesex Cup)	0	3	0
Middlesbrough	1899–1900	Second Division	3	0	0	0	—		3	0
Middlesbrough	1900–01	Second Division	3	1	0	0	—		3	1
Middlesbrough	1902–03	First Division	4	0	0	0	—		4	0
Middlesbrough	Total		10	1	0	0	—		10	1
Career total			10	1	0	0	3	0	13	1

== Honours ==
Millwall Athletic

- Southern League First Division: 1894–95, 1895–96
- United League: 1896–97, 1898–99

Middlesbrough

- Northern League: 1896–97
- FA Amateur Cup: 1894–95
