= Darwin Guagua =

Ecuadorian footballer (born 2007)

Personal information
- Full name: Darwin Johan Guagua Silva
- Date of birth: 6 November 2007 (age 19)
- Place of birth: Guayaquil, Guayas, Ecuador
- Height: 1.74 m (5 ft 9 in)
- Positions: Right winger; attacking midfielder

Team information
- Current team: Mérida AD
- Number: 55

Youth career
- 2018–2025: Independiente del Valle

Senior career*
| Years | Team | Apps | (Gls) |
| 2025–2026 | Independiente del Valle | 22 | (3) |
| 2026– | Brentford | 0 | (0) |
| 2026–2027 | → Mérida AD (loan) | 2 | (0) |

International career^{‡}
| 2025– | Ecuador | 2 | (0) |
- * Club domestic league appearances and goals as of 23:01, 22 May 2026 (UTC) ‡ National team caps and goals as of 22:02, 30 May 2026 (UTC)

Darwin Johan Guagua Silva (born 6 November 2007) is an Ecuadorian footballer who currently plays as a right winger or attacking midfielder for Primera Federación – Group 1 club Mérida AD, on loan from the B Team of English Premier League club Brentford. He also plays for the Ecuador national team.

== Club career ==
Following his senior international debut, pressure mounted on his club, Independiente Del Valle, to play him. Head coach Javier Rabanal, who described Guagua as "one of the most outstanding youth players" at the club, stated that Guagua had been busy with the club's under-20 side at the U-20 Copa Libertadores, and this was the reason he had not yet made his debut. Tipped to feature against fellow Ecuadorian side Barcelona in the Copa Libertadores, Guagua was absent from the travelling squad, with Independiente director Santiago Morales stating that his international call-up had affected him mentally, and "because of this state of mind", he was not considered. His debut would come in Independiente's following match; on 5 April he replaced Patrik Mercado in the second half of the 4–0 Ecuadorian Serie A win against Cuenca.

On his second appearance for the club, Guagua notched his first goal; in a Serie A game against Universidad Católica on 29 June 2025, having already assisted Ronald Briones' opening goal, Guagua netted from six yards for Independiente's second in their eventual 3–0 win. The following week, in Independiente's match against Barcelona, Guagua converted a scuffed cross from Emerson Pata on his weaker right foot in the 1–1 draw on 6 July.

On August 15, 2026, Guagua completed a move to Premier League club Brentford. He was immediately sent on loan to Spanish side Mérida AD, part of the same ownership group.

== International career ==
In March 2025, Guagua was controversially called up by manager Sebastián Beccacece to the Ecuador national football team, despite having not yet made his professional debut for his club, Independiente Del Valle, nor their affiliate in the Ecuadorian Serie B, Independiente Juniors. Having been readied as a substitute for Ecuador's match against Venezuela on 21 March, he remained on the bench following a late goal by Venezuela's Jhonder Cádiz. However, four days later, on 25 March, he started in Ecuador's eventual 0–0 draw with Chile. In making his senior debut, he became the third-youngest player in Ecuador's history, behind Kendry Páez and Jorge Bolaños.

In April 2025, Ecuadorian newspaper Diario Extra reported receiving audio recordings from someone close to the Ecuadorian Football Federation, suggesting that Guagua had been called up to the senior squad in such circumstances in order to raise his value for a sale to a foreign club. In making his senior international debut against Chile, Guagua became eligible to apply for a work visa in the United Kingdom, which would allow him to play in the Premier League. Despite this controversy, Guagua was called up again by Beccacece ahead of 2026 FIFA World Cup qualification matches against Brazil and Peru at the end of May 2025.

Guagua later revealed that he had received threats after making his debut, with fans unhappy that he had been allowed to feature for the senior national squad despite a perceived lack of merit to support his inclusion. Independiente's director, Santiago Morales, stated that Guagua had received psychological support from the club, as the messages had affected him, with manager Javier Rabanal keeping him away from first-team duties for two months following his club debut.

== Career statistics ==
=== Club ===
As of 22 May 2026.

Appearances and goals by club, season and competition
| Club | Season | League | | | Cup (Note: Includes Copa Ecuador) | | Continental | | Other | | Total | |
| Club | Season | Division | Apps | Goals | Apps | Goals | Apps | Goals | Apps | Goals | Apps | Goals |
|---|---|---|---|---|---|---|---|---|---|---|---|---|
| Independiente del Valle | 2025 | LigaPro Serie A | 13 | 2 | 1 | 0 | 8 (Note: Appearances in the Copa Sudamericana) | 0 | 0 | 0 | 22 | 2 |
| Independiente del Valle | 2026 | LigaPro Serie A | 9 | 1 | 0 | 0 | 3 (Note: Appearances in the Copa Libertadores) | 0 | 0 | 0 | 12 | 1 |
| Career total | | | 22 | 3 | 1 | 0 | 11 | 0 | 0 | 0 | 34 | 3 |

=== International ===
As of matches played 30 May 2026

| National team | Year | Apps | Goals |
|---|---|---|---|
| Ecuador | 2025 | 1 | 0 |
| Ecuador | 2026 | 1 | 0 |
| Total | | 2 | 0 |
