= 2024–25 Sønderjyske Fodbold season =

Sønderjyske Fodbold
2024–25 season
- Stadium: Haderslev Football Stadium
- Danish Superliga: Pre-season
- Danish Cup: Pre-season

The 2024–25 season is the 21st season in the history of Sønderjyske Fodbold, and the club's first season back in the Danish Superliga. In addition to the domestic league, the team is scheduled to participate in the Danish Cup.

== Transfers ==
=== In ===
Pos.	Player	Transferred from	Fee	Date	Source
GK	(Denmark) Jakob Busk	(Germany) Union Berlin	Free	1 July 2024	
MF	(Denmark) Alexander Lyng	(Switzerland) Servette FC	Loan	1 July 2024	
FW	(Cameroon) Ivan Djantou	(Albania) Skënderbeu	Undisclosed	1 July 2024	
MF	(Guinea) Mohamed Cherif Haidara	(Denmark) Ishøj IF	Undisclosed	4 July 2024	

=== Out ===
Pos.	Player	Transferred to	Fee	Date	Source
MF	(Denmark) Mads Hansen		End of contract	1 July 2024	

== Friendlies ==
=== Pre-season ===
29 June 2024 Friendly	FC Midtjylland (Denmark)	2–2	(Denmark) Sønderjyske
11:00	Duru 11' (o.g.); Djú 18'		Djantou 70', 73'

5 July 2024 Friendly	Sønderjyske (Denmark)	2–2	(Denmark) Hobro IK
13:00
Note: 4 x 30 minutes

12 July 2024 Friendly	Holstein Kiel (Germany)	0–0	(Denmark) Sønderjyske	Germany
13:00

16 July 2024 Friendly	FC Copenhagen (Denmark)	3–2	(Denmark) Sønderjyske
14:00

== Competitions ==
=== Overall record ===
Competition	First match	Last match	Starting round	Record							
Competition	First match	Last match	Starting round	Pld	W	D	L	GF	GA	GD	Win %
Superliga	21 July 2024		Matchday 1	2	0	1	1	1	2	−1	0.00
Danish Cup				0	0	0	0	0	0	+0	—
Total				2	0	1	1	1	2	−1	0.00

Last updated: 26 July 2024
Source: Soccerway

=== Superliga ===
==== League table ====
Pos	Team	Pld	W	D	L	GF	GA	GD	Pts	Qualification
8	Viborg	22	7	7	8	38	39	−1	28	Qualification for the Relegation round
9	AaB	22	5	6	11	23	41	−18	21	Qualification for the Relegation round
10	Lyngby	22	3	9	10	15	26	−11	18	Qualification for the Relegation round
11	Sønderjyske	22	4	5	13	26	51	−25	17	Qualification for the Relegation round
12	Vejle	22	3	4	15	24	50	−26	13	Qualification for the Relegation round

Source: Danish Football Association (in Danish), Soccerway
Rules for classification: 1) Points; 2) Goal difference; 3) Goals scored; 4) Away goals scored; 5) Play-off (played on neutral ground if determining teams for different rounds); 6) Draw.

Pos	Team	Pld	W	D	L	GF	GA	GD	Pts	
1	Copenhagen (C)	32	18	9	5	60	33	+27	63	Qualification for the UEFA Champions League second qualifying round
2	Midtjylland	32	19	5	8	64	42	+22	62	Qualification for the UEFA Europa League second qualifying round
3	Brøndby	32	13	12	7	58	46	+12	51	Qualification for the UEFA Conference League second qualifying round
4	Randers	32	13	9	10	57	50	+7	48	Qualification for the European play-off match
5	Nordsjælland	32	13	7	12	53	56	−3	46	
6	AGF	32	10	10	12	53	46	+7	40	

Source: Danish Football Association (in Danish), Soccerway
Rules for classification: 1) Points; 2) Goal difference; 3) Goals scored; 4) Away goals scored; 5) Play-off (played on neutral ground if determining teams for different rounds); 6) Draw.
(C) Champions

Pos	Team	Pld	W	D	L	GF	GA	GD	Pts	
1	Silkeborg (O)	32	13	10	9	56	41	+15	49	Qualification for the European play-off match
2	Viborg	32	12	11	9	57	50	+7	47	
3	Sønderjyske	32	10	7	15	47	64	−17	37	
4	Vejle	32	7	7	18	37	64	−27	28	
5	Lyngby (R)	32	5	12	15	26	43	−17	27	Relegation to 1st Division

Source: Danish Football Association (in Danish), Soccerway
Rules for classification: 1) Points; 2) Goal difference; 3) Goals scored; 4) Away goals scored; 5) Play-off (played on neutral ground if determining teams for different rounds); 6) Draw.
(O) Play-off winners; (R) Relegated

==== Results summary ====
Overall								Home						Away					
Pld	W	D	L	GF	GA	GD	Pts	W	D	L	GF	GA	GD	W	D	L	GF	GA	GD
2	0	1	1	1	2	−1	1	0	1	0	1	1	0	0	0	1	0	1	−1

Last updated: 26 July 2024.

==== Results by round ====
Round	1	2	3
Ground	A	H	A
Result	L	D	
Position			

Updated to match(es) played on 26 July 2024. Source:
A = Away; H = Home; W = Win; D = Draw; L = Loss

==== Matches ====
The match schedule was released on 7 June 2024.

21 July 2024 1	Silkeborg IF	1–0	Sønderjyske	Silkeborg
14:00	Mattsson 77'		Gallegos (yellow card) 84'	Stadium: JYSK Park; Referee: Mads-Kristoffer Kristoffersen

26 July 2024 2	Sønderjyske	1–1	Lyngby	Haderslev
19:00	Sommer Sørensen 14'; Wilkins (yellow card) 31'; Haidara (yellow card) 88'; Björklund (yellow card) 90+5'		Gytkjær 20', (yellow card) 90+5'	Stadium: Haderslev Football Stadium; Referee: Simon Duerlund Rasmussen

2 August 2024 3	AGF	v	Sønderjyske	Aarhus
19:00				Stadium: Ceres Arena
