= Næsby =

- Neighbourhood
- Location in the Region of Southern Denmark
- Coordinates: 55°25′12″N 10°21′15″E
- Country: Denmark
- Region: Southern Denmark
- Municipality: Odense Municipality
- Time zone: UTC+1 (CET)
  - Summer (DST): UTC+2 (CEST)

Næsby is a western central neighbourhood of Odense, in Funen, Denmark.
