= Brentford F.C. =

Association football club in England

Brentford
- Full name: Brentford Football Club
- Nickname: The Bees
- Short name: Brentford
- Founded: 10 October 1889; 137 years ago
- Ground: Brentford Community Stadium
- Capacity: 17,250
- Owner: Best Intentions Analytics Limited
- Chairman: Cliff Crown
- Head coach: Keith Andrews
- League: Premier League
- 2025–26: Premier League, 9th of 20
- Website: brentfordfc.com
Home colours	Away colours	Third colours

Brentford Football Club is a professional association football club based in Brentford, London, England. The team competes in the Premier League, the top tier of English football. Nicknamed "The Bees", the club was founded in 1889 and played home matches at Griffin Park from 1904 before moving to the Brentford Community Stadium in 2020.

Brentford initially played amateur football before they entered the London League in 1896 and finished as runners-up of the Second Division and then the First Division to win election into the Southern League in 1898. They won the Southern League Second Division in 1900–01 and were elected into the Football League in 1920. Brentford won the Third Division South title in 1932–33 and the Second Division title in 1934–35. The club enjoyed a successful spell in the top flight of English football, reaching a peak of fifth in the First Division, in 1935–36, their highest ever league finish, before three relegations left them in the Fourth Division by 1962. They were crowned Fourth Division champions in 1962–63, but were relegated in 1966 and again in 1973 after gaining promotion in 1971–72. Brentford spent 14 seasons in the Third Division after gaining promotion in 1977–78 and went on to win the Third Division title in 1991–92, though were relegated again in 1993.

Brentford were relegated into the fourth tier in 1998 and won promotion as champions in the 1998–99 campaign. The club were relegated in 2007 and won promotion as champions of League Two in 2008–09 and then were promoted out of League One in 2013–14. They had unsuccessful Championship play-off campaigns in 2015 and 2020. Brentford have a poor record in finals, finishing as runners-up in three Associate Members' Cup/Football League Trophy finals (1985, 2001 and 2011) and losing four play-off finals (the 1997 Second Division final, 2002 Second Division final, 2013 League One final and 2020 Championship final). However, Brentford won the 2021 Championship final to be promoted to the highest level for the first time since the 1946–47 season. They have since established themselves as a mid-table Premier League side, receiving plaudits for their recruitment and use of data science. Their main rivals are fellow West London-based clubs Fulham and Queens Park Rangers. They are affiliated with the women's club Brentford Women.

== History ==
League positions of Brentford since the 1920–21 season of the Football League.

=== 1889–1920: Formation and early years ===
In 1889, the town of Brentford, Middlesex was home to the Brentford Rowing Club and Boston Park Cricket Club. Attempts to form football and rugby clubs in the town fell by the wayside until a new recreation ground was opened on 17 October 1889. Seven days earlier, a meeting had taken place at the Oxford & Cambridge pub near Kew Bridge, during which it had been endeavoured between the rowing and cricket club members to decide how best to use the recreation ground. On 16 October 1889, the rowing club members again met at the Oxford & Cambridge pub and it was voted that the new club would play association football, be named "Brentford Football Club".

On 26 October 1889, the club staged its first practice match and on 23 November the club's first competitive match was played versus Kew, which resulted in a 1–1 draw. The 1892–93 season saw Brentford enter a league for the first time — the West London Alliance. The 1894–95 season was when Brentford first got their nickname, The Bees. A group of people from Borough Road College had come to a match to support their friend Joseph Gettins who was playing for Brentford at the time. They shouted their school chant, 'Buck up Bs!' but it was misheard by the media as 'Buck up bees!', and the name stuck.

Brentford continued to largely play cup and friendly matches until 1896, when the club was elected into the Second Division of the London League. The Bees finished second to secure promotion to the First Division. Brentford's London League exploits and its establishment as one of the top amateur clubs in London led to the club's election into the Second Division (London section) of the Southern League for the 1898–99 season. The club became a professional outfit in the 1899–1900 season and won a place in the top-flight in July 1901 after Gravesend United dropped out of the Southern League.

Brentford moved to Griffin Park, its first permanent home, in time for the beginning of the 1904–05 season. The Bees reached the FA Cup first round proper for the first time in 1905–06, advancing to the third round before succumbing to Liverpool at Anfield. Despite an initial upturn in form, 9 defeats in the final 11 matches of 1912–13 led to Brentford's relegation after an 11-season stay in the First Division.

In July 1915, the Southern League cancelled its competition for the duration of the First World War. Brentford competed in the London Combination during the War. The squad was decimated by the call-up of players for service or war work. Brentford won the London Combination title in 1918–19, four points ahead of nearest challengers Arsenal. Brentford turned down the opportunity to apply for election to the Football League for the 1919–20 season and instead applied for election to the First Division of the Southern League, which was awarded, finishing 15th.

=== 1920–1954: Establishment in the Football League and glory years ===
In May 1920, Brentford and 20 other Southern League First Division clubs were elected into the Football League as founder members of the Third Division for the 1920–21 season. 11 new players were signed and the Bees' first-ever Football League match took place on 28 August 1920 at Exeter City's St James Park, which resulted in a 3–0 defeat. Despite 18 goals from Harry King, a lack of goals from elsewhere in the side led Brentford to a 21st-place finish, but the club were re-elected into the league without going to a poll.

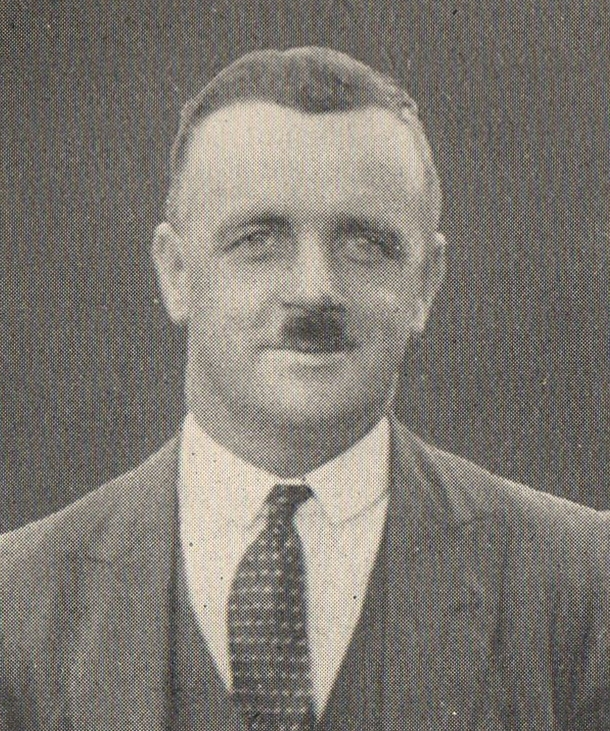
Harry Curtis, known as "The Guv'nor", Brentford's longest-serving and most successful manager.

It was all change at Griffin Park during the 1926 off-season, with former Gillingham boss Harry Curtis being installed as manager. Just 9 members of the previous season's squad were retained, but despite mid-table finishes over the following three seasons, Curtis slowly rebuilt the squad. The 1929–30 Third Division South season provided the foundation for the Bees' future success, however, the club missed out on promotion to Plymouth Argyle. The Bees romped to the 1932–33 Third Division South title, with Jack Holliday scoring a club-record 39 goals.

After topping the table for the third time in the 1934–35 season on 2 March 1935, the Bees would not again relinquish top spot, cruising to the title and promotion to the First Division for the first time in the club's history. Brentford also completed a unique double by winning the London Challenge Cup. After having risen from the third-tier to the first in the space of just three seasons, manager Harry Curtis elected to keep his squad intact for the 1935–36 First Division season. An extension to the New Road terrace increased Griffin Park's capacity to 4,000, which would generate extra income. After 15 matches, Brentford looked certain to be relegated, however, the club completed a remarkable turnaround, with the Bees losing just two of the final 23 matches and finishing in the club's all-time-highest position of 5th. Brentford again performed above expectations during the 1936–37 and 1937–38 seasons, finishing 6th in each campaign and reaching the FA Cup sixth round for the first time in the latter. The club reached its zenith between October 1937 and February 1938, holding onto top spot in the First Division for 17 consecutive matches.

The 1938–39 season was the beginning of the end of Brentford's peak; narrowly avoiding relegation. The 1939–40 season lasted just three matches before World War Two brought about the suspension of competitive football. Brentford competed in the Football League South and the London War League during the war years, with much of the team supplemented by guests and young amateurs, though the core of the pre-war team continued to play in the majority of the club's matches. On 30 May 1942, the Bees earned a 2–0 victory over Portsmouth in the London War Cup final at Wembley Stadium.

Brentford's 1946–47 squad, for the first competitive season after the Second World War, was propped up by the ageing core of the 1939–40 pre-war squad which would lead to the Bees' relegation from the First Division. After narrowly avoiding a second successive relegation in 1947–48, manager Harry Curtis announced that the 1948–49 season would be his last in the job after nearly 23 years. The season ended with a poor 18th-place finish, though notably the FA Cup sixth round fixture at home to Leicester City set a new club-record attendance of 38,678. In 1953–54 Brentford's relegation to the Third Division South was confirmed on the final day of the season after a 3–1 defeat to Leicester City at Griffin Park.

=== 1954–1986: Decline and financial difficulties ===
Relegation to the Third Division South at the end of the 1953–54 season meant that 1954–55 would be Brentford's first in the bottom-tier for 21 years. After three consecutive top-six finishes, the rot set in during the 1960–61 season, with the poor form on the field mirrored by the news from the boardroom of debts of £50,000 (equivalent to £1,000,000 in 2025).

After the sale of several key players, the Bees finished second-from-bottom of the 1961–62 Third Division and were relegated, starting several yo-yo years between the Third and Fourth divisions. Despite winning just seven of the final 14 matches of the season, Brentford finished 1962–63 as Fourth Division champions. However, in 1965–66, Billy Gray couldn't prevent relegation to the Fourth Division. In December 1966, it was revealed by chairman Dunnett at Brentford's AGM that the club had lost £20,000 during the previous financial year and that he would be selling his stake in the club. Earlier that month, there had been an approach from neighbours QPR, suggesting that the two clubs share Griffin Park. On 19 January 1967, the news broke that Dunnett and his QPR counterpart Jim Gregory had reached an agreement that Brentford's rivals would move into Griffin Park, Rangers' ground Loftus Road would be redeveloped as housing and Brentford, as a club, would cease to exist.

After a tense month of fan protests, negotiations and donations amounting to £8,500 (equivalent to £140,000 in 2025), a six-man syndicate headed by former Plymouth Argyle chairman Ron Blindell took over Dunnett's shares on 23 February 1967 and guaranteed a 12-month bridging loan of £104,000. The following day, Blindell, as chairman, took control of the club. It transpired that QPR chairman Jim Gregory had resurrected his interest in Griffin Park and offered £250,000 for the use of the ground, a fee that would wipe out Brentford's £135,000 debt instantly, if the club moved to Hillingdon. The name "Brentford Borough FC" had already been chosen for the new Hillingdon-based club, but once again Brentford was saved at the eleventh hour, with former director Walter Wheatley granting the club a £69,000 interest-free loan, repayable in 12 months.

Under Frank Blunstone, Brentford secured promotion back to the Third Division with two matches of the season remaining. However, the Bees were relegated on the final day of the 1972–73 season. After a period of consolidation, Bill Dodgin Jr. led Brentford to a 4th-place finish and promotion to the Third Division in the 1977–78 season. Brentford reached its first major competitive cup final in the 1984–85 season, but lost 3–1 against Wigan Athletic in the 1985 Football League Trophy final at Wembley Stadium. In the 1988–89 season, the Bees' reached the sixth round of the FA Cup, which ended after a 4–0 defeat to Liverpool at Anfield.

=== 1986–2014: Yo-yo club in the lower divisions ===
In 1991–92, six wins from the six final matches saw Brentford recover to win the Third Division championship on the final day and secure second-tier football for the first time since the 1953–54 season. However, Brentford returned immediately to the third tier. In 1996–97, Brentford missed out on promotion, losing the play-off final against Crewe Alexandra. In the 1997–98 season, Brentford were relegated to the Third Division on the final day of the season.

In June 1998, former Crystal Palace chairman Ron Noades assumed ownership of Brentford and made wholesale changes throughout the club, installing himself as chairman-manager. The Bees won the 1998–99 Third Division championship on the final day, after beating Cambridge United 1–0 in a "winner takes all" match at the Abbey Stadium. Brentford reached the 2001 Football League Trophy final, but were defeated 2–1 by Port Vale. At the end of the 2001–02 season, Brentford narrowly missed out on automatic promotion on the final day to Reading. The Bees could only manage a draw in a must win match, before later losing the 2002 play-off final, to Stoke City, 2–0.

In the wake of the ITV Digital collapse, the financial restraints placed on the club by Noades left new manager Wally Downes with an inexperienced squad and administration was narrowly avoided in August 2002. Noades quit the club and handed control to supporters' trust Bees United. Brentford narrowly avoided relegation at the end of the 2003–04 season. In both 2004–05 and 2005–06, Brentford reached the FA Cup fifth round and the play-off semi-finals. In 2006, Matthew Benham made his first interaction with Brentford, donating £500,000. He was anonymous and was known as the 'Mysterious Investor'. Despite a good start to the 2006–07 season, Brentford's relegation was confirmed on 9 April 2007, eventually finishing bottom of the league. Despite the relegation, the club's finances had been improved after Matthew Benham paid nearly £3 million to take over some of the club's debts in January 2007.

In July 2009, Benham and Bees United made a deal under the codename 'Gecko' in which he agreed to give £1m every year for 5 years, in return for increasing his equity to 35% and have an option to become the owner of Brentford by 2014. Under Andy Scott, the Bees won the League Two title after victory in the penultimate match of the 2008–09 season. 2010–11 became memorable for Brentford's cup exploits, going on a run to the fourth round of the League Cup and reaching the 2011 Football League Trophy final, which was lost 1–0 to Carlisle United. In June 2012, Benham fully bought the club from Bees United. However, Bees United still keep a place on the club board. Brentford came within a penalty kick of automatic promotion to the Championship on the final day of the 2012–13 season, losing 1–0 to promotion rivals Doncaster Rovers at Griffin Park, who only needed a draw to secure automatic promotion. The Bees would eventually lose to Yeovil Town in the play-off final. Despite a poor start to the season, Mark Warburton led the Bees to automatic promotion to the Championship on April 18th 2014 confirmed by a home tie vs Preston North End F.C..

=== 2014–present: Rise to the Premier League and establishment as a top-flight club ===
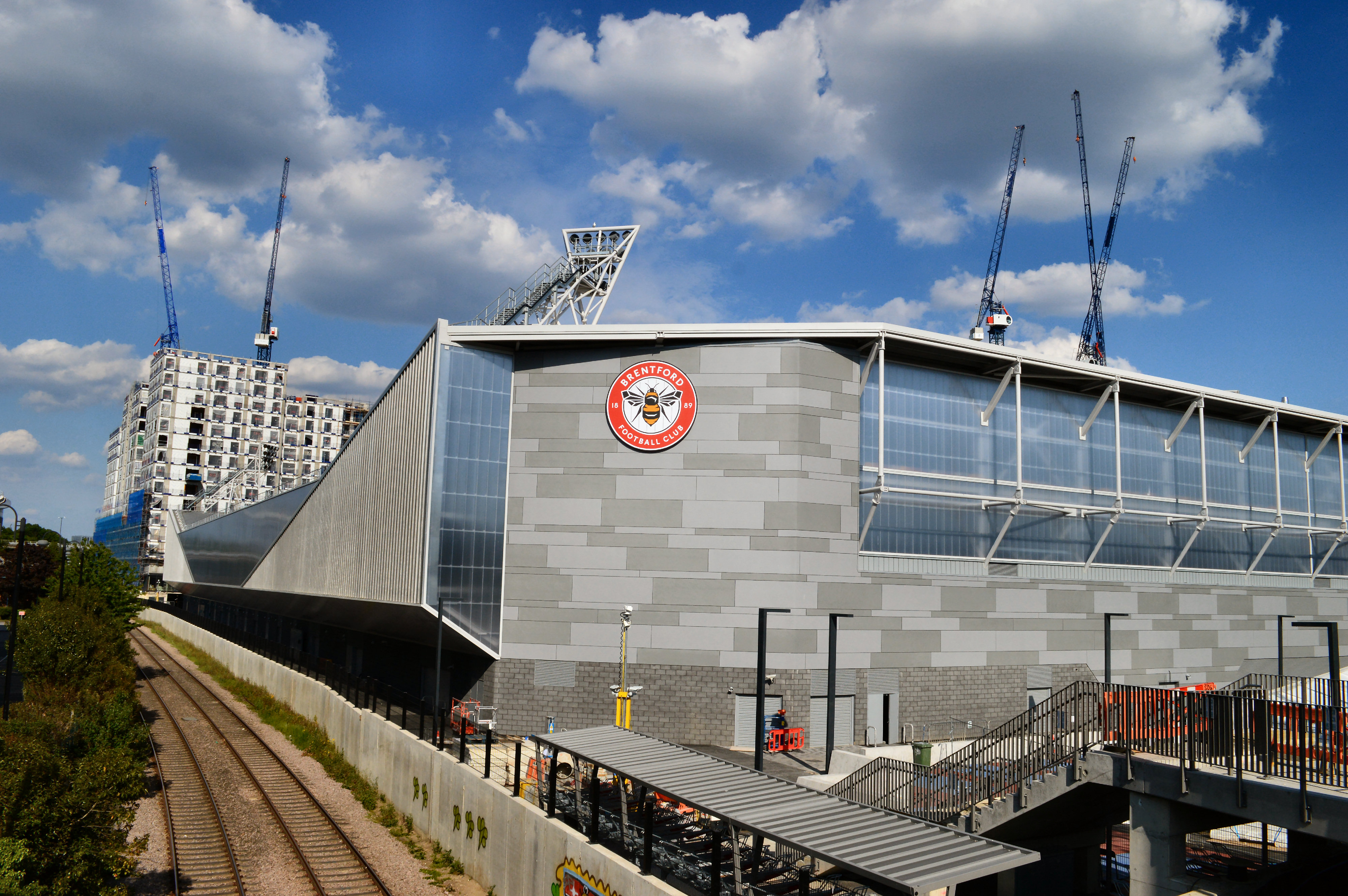
The club moved out of Griffin Park and into the Brentford Community Stadium in August 2020.

In their first season in the second tier since 1993, Brentford finished 5th but lost to Middlesbrough in the play-off semi-finals. Under Dean Smith, Brentford became an established Championship side. Smith's successor, Thomas Frank, took Brentford to the 2020 Championship play-off final after finishing third in the league, but lost 2–1 to West London rivals Fulham. During the 2020 off-season, the club moved out of Griffin Park (its home ground for 116 years) and into the Brentford Community Stadium, a 17,250-capacity all-seater stadium. Brentford finally broke their play-off curse having previously lost 9 out of 9 play-off campaigns which was then a national record and went one better in the play-offs that year, securing promotion to the Premier League with a 2–0 victory over Swansea City in the 2021 Championship play-off final.

Brentford played in the top division of English football for the first time in 74 years. Frank guided his side to 13th, 9th, 16th and 10th-placed finishes in Brentford's first four Premier League campaigns, before eventually leaving the club in June 2025 to manage Tottenham Hotspur. Keith Andrews was eventually announced as his successor later that month.

In February 2026, British film director Sir Matthew Vaughn doubled his investment in Brentford FC, injecting an additional £40 million to strengthen the club as it targets European qualification.

== Current and past grounds ==
- Clifden Road (1889–1891)
- Benn's Field (1891–1895)
- Shotter's Field (1895–1898)
- Cross Roads (1898–1900)
- York Road (1900–1904)
- Griffin Park (1904–2020)
- Gtech Community Stadium (2020–present)

== Players ==
=== First team squad ===
As of 28 August 2026

Note: Flags indicate national team as defined under FIFA eligibility rules; some limited exceptions apply. Players may hold more than one non-FIFA nationality.

No.	Pos.	Nation	Player
1	GK	IRL	Caoimhín Kelleher
2	DF	SCO	Aaron Hickey
3	DF	JAM	Rico Henry
4	DF	NED	Sepp van den Berg
6	MF	UKR	Yehor Yarmolyuk
7	FW	GER	Kevin Schade
8	MF	DEN	Mathias Jensen
9	FW	BRA	Igor Thiago
10	MF	ENG	Josh Dasilva
11	FW	BFA	Dango Ouattara
12	GK	ISL	Hákon Valdimarsson
13	FW	ENG	Callum Wilson
14	MF	POR	Fábio Carvalho
17	MF	NED	Antoni Milambo
18	MF	MLI	Mamadou Sangaré

No.	Pos.	Nation	Player
19	FW	ENG	Jaidon Anthony
20	DF	NOR	Kristoffer Ajer
22	DF	IRL	Nathan Collins (captain)
23	MF	ENG	Keane Lewis-Potter
24	MF	DEN	Mikkel Damsgaard
25	DF	SEN	El Hadji Malick Diouf
27	MF	GER	Vitaly Janelt
31	GK	ENG	Ellery Balcombe
33	DF	ITA	Michael Kayode
36	DF	KOR	Kim Ji-soo
39	FW	BRA	Gustavo Nunes
44	DF	AUT	Jannik Schuster
47	FW	BEL	Kaye Furo
48	DF	NGR	Benjamin Fredrick

=== Out on loan ===
Note: Flags indicate national team as defined under FIFA eligibility rules; some limited exceptions apply. Players may hold more than one non-FIFA nationality.

No.	Pos.	Nation	Player
21	DF	ENG	Jayden Meghoma (at Portsmouth until 31 May 2027)
26	MF	TUR	Yunus Emre Konak (at Lincoln City until 31 May 2027)
41	GK	USA	Julian Eyestone (at Rotherham until 31 May 2027)
43	DF	ENG	Benjamin Arthur (at Portsmouth until 31 May 2027)

No.	Pos.	Nation	Player
45	FW	ENG	Romelle Donovan (at Sheffield United until 31 May 2027)
—	GK	ENG	Matthew Cox (at Barnet until 31 May 2027)
—	DF	ENG	Josh Stephenson (at Crewe Alexandra until 30 June 2027)

=== Brentford B ===
As of 21 August 2026

Note: Flags indicate national team as defined under FIFA eligibility rules; some limited exceptions apply. Players may hold more than one non-FIFA nationality.

No.	Pos.	Nation	Player
48	MF	BEL	Luka Bentt
49	DF	ENG	Ollie Shield
—	GK	ENG	Reggie Rose
—	GK	GER	Connor Wolfheimer
—	DF	IRL	Val Adedokun
—	DF	ENG	Caelan Avenell
—	DF	LTU	Matas Klimas

No.	Pos.	Nation	Player
—	DF	IRL	Conor McManus
—	DF	ENG	Luca Picotto
—	MF	ENG	Andre Grey
—	MF	ENG	Theo Mawene
—	MF	ENG	Riley Owen
—	FW	BEN	Michel Boni
—	FW	ENG	Isaac Holland

=== Out on loan ===
Note: Flags indicate national team as defined under FIFA eligibility rules; some limited exceptions apply. Players may hold more than one non-FIFA nationality.

No.	Pos.	Nation	Player
—	MF	ECU	Darwin Guagua (at Mérida AD until 30 June 2027)
—	MF	ENG	Ben Krauhaus (at Falkirk until 30 June 2027)

No.	Pos.	Nation	Player
—	FW	ENG	Michael Olakigbe (at WSG Tirol until 30 June 2027)

== Coaching staff ==
As of 12 June 2026

=== First team ===
Name	Role
(Republic of Ireland) Keith Andrews	Head Coach
(Republic of Ireland) Damien Duff	Assistant Head Coach
(Republic of Ireland) Kevin O'Connor	First Team Coach
(Scotland) Neil MacFarlane	Assistant First Team Coach
(England) Mehmet Ali	Assistant First Team Coach
(England) Jack Lester	Assistant First Team Coach
(Spain) Manu Sotelo	Goalkeeping Coach
(Republic of Ireland) Stephen Rice	Set Piece Coach
(England) Ben Ryan	Performance Director
(England) Josh Kirk	Head of Analysis
(England) Luke Stopforth	Head of Data and Technology
(England) Bob Oteng	Kit Logistics Manager
(England) Dr. Stephen Thompson	Head of Medical
(Wales) Rhys Weston	Head of Football Operations

=== Brentford B ===
Name	Role
(England) Sam Saunders	Head Coach
(Finland) Jani Viander	Goalkeeper Coach
(England) Cameron Tucker-White	Athletic Coach
(England) Alex Davis	Performance Coach
(England) Haydee Agras	Analyst
(England) Jordan Marley	Kit Manager

== Management ==
As of 30 January 2025

Name	Role
Matthew Benham	Majority Owner
Cliff Crown	Chairman
Jon Varney	Chief Executive, executive director
Lisa Skelhorn	Club Secretary
Roger Crook	Club Secretary
Phil Giles	Director of Football, executive director
Lee Dykes	Technical director
Nity Raj	General counsel, executive director
Deji Davies	Non-executive director
Stuart Hatcher	Non-executive director
Preeti Shetty	Non-executive director
Marcus Gayle	Club Ambassador
Peter Gilham	Club Ambassador

== Nickname ==
Brentford's nickname is "The Bees". The nickname was unintentionally created by students of Borough Road College in the 1890s, when they attended a match and shouted the college's chant "buck up Bs" in support of their friend and then-Brentford player Joseph Gettins. Local newspapers misheard the chant as "Buck up Bees" and the nickname stuck.

== Colours and badge ==
Brentford's predominant home colours are a red and white striped shirt, black shorts and red or black socks. These have been the club's predominant home colours since the 1925–26 season, bar one season – 1960–61 – when yellow (gold) and blue were used, unsuccessfully. The colours on entering the Football League, in 1920–21, were white shirts, navy shorts and navy socks. Away kits have varied over the years, with the current colours being a light pink shirt and socks, with purple shorts, a first for the club. It includes a button-down detail with a ribbed collar. The Brentford badge features in purple and the sleeves have a printed stripe cuff.

Brentford have had several badges on their shirts since it was formed in 1889. The first one, in 1893, was a white shield, with 'BFC' in blue and a wavy line in blue, which is thought to represent the river and the rowing club, who founded the football club. The next known badge, the Middlesex County Arms, was on shirts donated by a club supporter in 1909. The Brentford and Chiswick arms, as a badge, was used just for the one season, in 1938–39. The next badge was in 1971–72 when a shield, formed into quadrants, which had a hive and bees in one, 3 seaxes in another and the other two with red and white stripes. In 1972, the club organised a competition to design a new crest, which was won by Mr B.G. Spencer's design, a circle with a bee and stripes and the founding date of 1888. This was introduced in 1973 and used until May 1975, when it was brought to the club's attention, via Graham Haynes, that the club was formed in 1889 and not in 1888. Therefore, a new badge, reputedly designed by Dan Tana – the club's chairman at the time – was introduced for the 1975–76 season and continued until 1994 when the current badge was introduced. In 2011 Russell Grant claimed to have designed the badge in a BBC interview; however, it was in fact designed in 1993 for two season tickets by supporter Andrew Henning, following a request from Keith Loring, the then chief executive. In 2017, the club redesigned its crest to a more modern, uncluttered, design with the flexibility for use in two tone colour print. The design is a double roundel with the club name and year founded in white on a red background and a large central bee.

=== Kit suppliers and shirt sponsors ===
Period	Kit supplier	Shirt sponsor (front)	Shirt sponsor (sleeve)	Shirt sponsor (back)	Shorts sponsor
1975–1976	Umbro	None	None	None	None
1977–1980	Bukta	None	None	None	None
1980–1981	Adidas	None	None	None	None
1981–1984	Osca	DHL	None	None	None
1984–1986	Osca	KLM	None	None	None
1986–1988	Spall	KLM	None	None	None
1988–1990	Hobott	KLM	None	None	None
1990–1992	Chad	KLM	None	None	None
1992–1995	Hummel	KLM	None	None	None
1995–1996	Core	Ericsson	None	None	None
1996–1998	Cobra	Ericsson	None	None	None
1998–2000	Super League	GMB	None	None	None
2000–2002	Patrick	GMB	None	None	None
2002–2003	TFG	GMB	None	None	None
2003–2004	TFG	St. George PLC	None	None	None
2004–2005	TFG	St. George PLC	None	UK Packaging	UK Packaging
2005–2006	Lonsdale	St. George PLC	None	UK Packaging	UK Packaging
2006–2007	Lonsdale	Samvo Group	None	UK Packaging	UK Packaging
2007–2008	Puma	Samvo Group	None	UK Packaging	UK Packaging
2008–2009	Puma	Hertings (Home) & MKT Computers (Away)	None	Intermode Shipping (Home) & Cardiac Risk in the Young (Away)	MKT Computers (Home)
2009–2010	Puma	Hertings (Home) & MKT Computers (Away)	None	SPIT Tools (Home) & Cardiac Risk in the Young (Away)	Reliable Networks
2010–2011	Puma	Hertings (Home) & Bathwise (Away)	None	Reliable Networks	Thames Valley University
2011–2012	Puma	Hertings (Home) & Bathwise (Away)	None	None	None
2012–2013	Puma	SkyEx.co.uk	None	None	Reliable Networks
2013–2014	Adidas	SkyEx.co.uk	None	None	Reliable Networks (Home)
2014–2015	Adidas	SkyEx.co.uk	None	Matchbook.com	Matchbook.com
2015–2016	Adidas	Matchbook.com	None	None	
2016–2017	Adidas	888sport	None	None	
2017–2019	Adidas	LeoVegas	None	None	
2019–2020	Umbro	EcoWorld London	None	None	
2020–2021	Umbro	Utilita	None	Hollywoodbets	Hollywoodbets
2021–2023	Umbro	Hollywoodbets	SafetyCulture	None	
2023–2025	Umbro	Hollywoodbets	PensionBee	None	
2025–2026	Joma	Hollywoodbets	Cazoo	None	
2026–present	Joma	Indeed	Cazoo	None	

== Rivalries ==
Brentford's main rivals are Fulham, Chelsea and Queens Park Rangers. The club has a long-standing rivalry with Fulham. In the past this fixture has been marred by crowd violence. Brentford's rivalry with Queens Park Rangers intensified in 1967, when Rangers failed in an attempted takeover of the Bees, a move which, had it succeeded, would have seen Rangers move into Griffin Park and Brentford quit the Football League. As with the Fulham and Chelsea rivalries, this fixture sees passions run high amongst both sets of supporters with local pride at stake.

== International links ==
In February 2013, it was announced that Brentford had entered into partnership with Icelandic 1. deild karla club UMF Selfoss, which would enable Brentford to send youth and development squad players to Iceland to gain experience. The partnership also sees the two clubs exchanging coaching philosophies and allows Brentford to utilise UMF Selfoss' scouting network. In May 2013, the Brentford staff forged links with Ugandan lower league club Gulu United as part of the "United for United" project, aimed at forming the region's first youth training camp and identifying talented players. Brentford owner Matthew Benham became majority shareholder in Danish club FC Midtjylland in 2014 and the staff of both clubs share ideas. In 2023, Benham sold FC Midtjylland to Danish billionaire Anders Holch Povlsen, therefore, they are now no longer sister clubs. In April 2025, it was announced that the holding company for Brentford FC, Best Intentions Analytics, was acquiring 100% ownership of the Spanish side, Asociación Deportiva Mérida (Mérida AD). Similar to previous international affiliations, this move allowed for easier access to spanish markets and scouting networks.

=== Affiliated clubs ===
- (England) London Tigers
- (Iceland) UMF Selfoss
- (Uganda) Gulu United
- (Spain) Mérida AD

== In popular culture ==
- The club is mentioned often on the BBC comedy People Just Do Nothing. DJ Beats often wears a Brentford jacket, and Angel's room is full of Brentford memorabilia.
- Actor and comedian Bradley Walsh was a professional at the club in the late 1970s, but never made the first team squad.
- Dan Tana, Hollywood actor and restaurateur, served on the club's board and was chairman.
- Model Stephen James played for the club's youth team prior to his release in 2008.
- Entertainer Vic Oliver served as the club's vice-president in the early 1950s and was later president of the Brentford Supporters' Club.
- Politician Jack Dunnett served as club chairman between 1961 and 1967.
- Former Yes keyboardist and solo artist Rick Wakeman became a director of the club for a year in 1979.
- Radiohead guitarist Ed O'Brien has been a supporter and season ticket holder.
- Status Quo bass player John "Rhino" Edwards is a supporter; he wrote and recorded a song for Brentford player Lloyd Owusu.
- In season two of Ted Lasso, Brentford is mentioned as AFC Richmond's biggest rival.

== Honours ==
League

- Second Division / Championship (level 2)
  - Champions: 1934–35
  - Play-off winners: 2021
- Third Division South / Third Division / League One (level 3)
  - Champions: 1932–33, 1991–92
  - Promoted: 2013–14
- Fourth Division / League Two (level 4)
  - Champions: 1962–63, 1998–99, 2008–09
  - Promoted: 1971–72, 1977–78
- United League
  - Champions: 1907–08
- London League
  - Champions: 1908–09
- Southern League Second Division
  - Champions: 1900–01
- London League Second Division
  - Champions: 1896–97
- West London Alliance
  - Champions: 1892–93 (Note: No system of promotion in place.)

Cup

- Football League Trophy
  - Runners-up: 1984–85, 2000–01, 2010–11
- London Senior Cup
  - Winners: 1897–98*, 2021–22
- London Challenge Cup
  - Winners: 1934–35, 1964–65, 1966–67
- Middlesex Junior Cup
  - Winners: 1893–94
- West Middlesex Cup
  - Winners: 1894–95
- Middlesex Senior Cup
  - Winners: 1897–98
- Southern Professional Charity Cup
  - Winners: 1908–09
- Ealing Hospital Cup
  - Winners: 1910–11
- London Charity Fund
  - Winners: 1928

Wartime honours

- London Combination
  - Winners: 1918–19
- London War Cup
  - Winners: 1941–42

== Best performances ==
- Highest league finish: 5th in First Division (level 1), 1935–36
- Best FA Cup performance: Sixth round/quarter-finals, 1937–38, 1945–46, 1948–49, 1988–89
- Best League Cup performance: Semi-finals, 2020–21
- Best League Trophy performance: Runners-up, 1984–85, 2000–01, 2010–11
- Best Empire Exhibition Trophy performance: First round, 1938
- Best Southern Professional Floodlit Cup performance: Semi-finals, 1955–56, 1956–57
- Best First Alliance Cup performance: First round, 1988

== See also ==
- Football in London
