= 2020–21 Sunderland A.F.C. season =

English football club season

Sunderland A.F.C.
2020–21 season
- Owner: Stewart Donald (until 18 February); Kyril Louis-Dreyfus (from 18 February)
- Head Coach: Phil Parkinson (until 29 November); Lee Johnson (from 5 December)
- Stadium: Stadium of Light
- League One: 4th
- FA Cup: First round
- EFL Cup: First round
- EFL Trophy: Winners
- Top goalscorer: League: Charlie Wyke (26); All: Charlie Wyke (31)
- Average home league attendance: 0
Home colours	Away colours

The 2020–21 season was Sunderland's 142nd season in their history and the third consecutive season in EFL League One. Along with League One, the club also participated in the FA Cup, EFL Cup and EFL Trophy. The season covered the period from 1 July 2020 to 30 June 2021.

The club finished fourth in the league and would miss out on promotion after losing 3–2 on aggregate to Lincoln City in the play-off semi final. They were winners of the EFL Trophy, beating Tranmere Rovers 1–0 in the final, in the club's first win at Wembley since 1973.

== First team squad ==
Squad No.	Name	Nationality	Position(s)	Age	Ends	Signed from	Apps	Goals
Goalkeepers
1	Lee Burge	(England)	GK	33	2021	(England) Coventry City	22	0
20	Remi Matthews	(England)	GK	32	2021	(England) Bolton Wanderers	6	0
43	Anthony Patterson	(England)	GK	26	2021	Academy	1	0
51	Adam Richardson	(England)	GK	23	2024	Academy	0	0
Defenders
2	Conor McLaughlin	(Northern Ireland)	RB	35	2021	(England) Millwall	30	0
3	Tom Flanagan	(Northern Ireland)	CB	34	2022	(England) Burton Albion	76	4
4	Jordan Willis	(England)	CB	32	2021	(England) Coventry City	50	2
5	Bailey Wright	(Australia)	CB	34	2022	(England) Bristol City	20	1
16	Dion Sanderson	(England)	CB	26	2021	(England) Wolves (loan)	3	0
19	Arbenit Xhemajli	(Kosovo)	CB	28	2022	(Switzerland) Neuchâtel Xamax	1	0
25	Callum McFadzean	(Scotland)	LB	32	2021	(England) Plymouth Argyle	3	0
33	Denver Hume	(England)	LB	28	2021	Academy	64	2
35	Ollie Younger	(England)	CB	26	2021	(England) Burnley	1	0
40	Brandon Taylor	(England)	CB	27	2021	Academy	6	0
54	Patrick Almond	(Scotland)	CB	17	2021	Academy	0	0
Midfielders
6	Max Power	(England)	CM	33	2021	(England) Wigan Athletic	98	9
7	Chris Maguire	(Scotland)	AM	37	2021	(England) Bury	98	25
8	George Dobson	(England)	CM	28	2022	(England) Walsall	44	2
11	Lynden Gooch	(United States)	AM	30	2022	Academy	136	21
13	Luke O'Nien	(England)	CM	31	2021	(England) Wycombe Wanderers	109	10
14	Josh Scowen	(England)	CM	33	2022	(England) Queens Park Rangers	17	1
17	Elliot Embleton	(England)	AM	27	2021	Academy	12	0
21	Jack Diamond	(England)	RW	26	2024	Academy	9	1
23	Grant Leadbitter	(England)	CM	40	2021	(England) Middlesbrough	165	14
24	Dan Neil	(England)	CM	24	2022	Academy	4	0
26	Carl Winchester	(Northern Ireland)	CM	33	2023	(England) Forest Green Rovers	1	0
28	Aiden McGeady	(Republic of Ireland)	LW	40	2020	(England) Everton	86	22
29	Cieran Dunne	(Scotland)	LW	26	2021	(Scotland) Falkirk	1	0
34	Jake Hackett	(England)	CM	26	2022	Academy	3	0
36	Sam Wilding	(England)	DM	26	2021	(England) West Bromwich Albion	1	0
38	Vinnie Steels	(England)	LW	25	2021	(England) Burnley	1	0
39	Stephen Wearne	(England)	AM	25	2021	(England) Middlesbrough	0	0
42	Josh Hawkes	(England)	AM	27	2022	(England) Hartlepool United	1	0
Forwards
9	Charlie Wyke	(England)	ST	33	2021	(England) Bradford City	77	19
10	Aiden O'Brien	(Republic of Ireland)	ST	32	2022	(England) Millwall	12	1
12	Benjamin Mbunga-Kimpioka	(Sweden)	ST	26	2021	(Sweden) IK Sirius	14	3
22	Will Grigg	(Northern Ireland)	ST	35	2022	(England) Wigan Athletic	56	8
27	Jordan Jones	(Northern Ireland)	LW	31	2021	(Scotland) Rangers (loan)	10	2
31	Ross Stewart	(Scotland)	ST	30	2023	(Scotland) Ross County	1	1
46	Mitchell Curry	(England)	ST	27	2021	(England) Middlesbrough	0	0

== Transfers ==
=== Transfers in ===
Date from	Position	Nationality	Name	From	Fee	Ref.
30 July 2020	LW	(Republic of Ireland)	Aiden O'Brien	(England) Millwall	Free transfer	
2 August 2020	CB	(Australia)	Bailey Wright	(England) Bristol City	Free transfer	
15 August 2020	DF	(Wales)	Bobby Beaumont	(Wales) Wrexham	Free transfer	
15 August 2020	DM	(England)	Sam Wilding	(England) West Bromwich Albion	Free transfer	
15 August 2020	LW	(England)	Vinnie Steels	(England) Burnley	Free transfer	
21 August 2020	CB	(England)	Morgan Feeney	(England) Everton	Free transfer	
21 August 2020	GK	(England)	Remi Matthews	(England) Bolton Wanderers	Free transfer	
28 August 2020	RB	(England)	Kenton Richardson	(England) Hartlepool United	Free transfer	
1 September 2020	CF	(England)	Will Harris	(England) Burnley	Free transfer	
4 September 2020	CB	(Kosovo)	Arbenit Xhemajli	(Switzerland) Neuchâtel Xamax	Free transfer	
7 September 2020	CF	(England)	Danny Graham	(England) Blackburn Rovers	Free transfer	
9 September 2020	AM	(England)	Stephen Wearne	(England) Middlesbrough	Free transfer	
15 September 2020	AM	(England)	Josh Hawkes	(England) Hartlepool United	Undisclosed	
16 September 2020	CF	(England)	Mitchell Curry	(England) Middlesbrough	Free transfer	
16 September 2020	CB	(England)	Ollie Younger	(England) Burnley	Free transfer	
21 October 2020	LM	(Scotland)	Callum McFadzean	(England) Plymouth Argyle	Free transfer	
10 January 2021	CM	(Northern Ireland)	Carl Winchester	(England) Forest Green Rovers	Undisclosed	
31 January 2021	CF	(Scotland)	Ross Stewart	(Scotland) Ross County	Undisclosed	

=== Loans in ===
Date from	Position	Nationality	Name	From	Date Until	Ref.
16 October 2020	CB	(England)	Dion Sanderson	(England) Wolverhampton Wanderers	End of season	
29 January 2021	LW	(Northern Ireland)	Jordan Jones	(Scotland) Rangers	End of season	
29 January 2021	LB	(England)	Jake Vokins	(England) Southampton	End of season	

=== Loans out ===
Date from	Position	Nationality	Name	To	Date until	Ref.
29 September 2020	CF	(Scotland)	Lee Connelly	(Scotland) Alloa Athletic	End of season	
22 January 2021	DM	(England)	George Dobson	(England) AFC Wimbledon	End of season	
1 February 2021	CM	(England)	Elliot Embleton	(England) Blackpool	End of season	
2 February 2021	CF	(Northern Ireland)	Will Grigg	(England) Milton Keynes Dons	End of season	
27 March 2021	CF	(Sweden)	Benjamin Mbunga-Kimpioka	(England) Torquay United	End of season	

=== Transfers out ===
Date from	Position	Nationality	Name	To	Fee	Ref.
1 July 2020	GK	(France)	Ahmed Abdelkader	Unattached	Released	
1 July 2020	CB	(England)	Jack Bainbridge	(England) Southport	Released	
1 July 2020	CB	(England)	Jack Baldwin	(England) Bristol Rovers	Released	
1 July 2020	GK	(England)	Adam Cameron	(England) Whickham F.C.	Released	
1 July 2020	CB	(England)	Michael Collins	Unattached	Released	
1 July 2020	FW	(France)	Lilyan Compper	Unattached	Released	
1 July 2020	CM	(Republic of Ireland)	Jack Connolly	(Republic of Ireland) Cabinteely	Released	
1 July 2020	CB	(Faroe Islands)	Andrias Edmundsson	(Spain) Águilas	Released	
1 July 2020	DM	(England)	Kane Evans	(England) Newcastle Benfield F.C.	Released	
1 July 2020	RB	(England)	Owen Gamble	(England) York City	Released	
1 July 2020	MF	(England)	Nathan Greenwood	Unattached	Released	
1 July 2020	RW	(England)	Ryan Leonard	(England) Sunderland RCA	Released	
1 July 2020	CB	(Wales)	Joel Lynch	Unattached	Released	
1 July 2020	CF	(Northern Ireland)	Kyle Lafferty	(Italy) Reggina	Released	
1 July 2020	GK	(Scotland)	Jon McLaughlin	(Scotland) Rangers	Free transfer	
1 July 2020	LB	(Scotland)	Liam Miller	Unattached	Released	
1 July 2020	GK	(Scotland)	Jack Newman	(Scotland) Dundee United	Released	
1 July 2020	CB	(England)	Harry Ord	(England) Pickering Town	Released	
1 July 2020	CM	(England)	Ethan Robson	(England) Blackpool	Released	
1 July 2020	DM	(Scotland)	Ruben Sammut	(England) Dulwich Hamlet F.C.	Released	
1 July 2020	CF	(England)	Connor Slack	(England) Esh Winning F.C.	Released	
1 July 2020	CB	(New Zealand)	Tommy Smith	(England) Colchester United	Released	
1 July 2020	RB	(England)	Tom Smith	(England) Whitley Bay F.C.	Released	
1 July 2020	RW	(England)	Duncan Watmore	(England) Middlesbrough	Released	
1 July 2020	CB	(Turkey)	Alim Öztürk	(Turkey) Ümraniyespor	Released	
3 July 2020	CF	(Republic of Ireland)	Cole Kiernan	(England) Middlesbrough	Free transfer	
18 July 2020	CF	(England)	Joe Hugill	(England) Manchester United	Undisclosed	
18 July 2020	LB	(England)	Logan Pye	(England) Manchester United	Undisclosed	
27 July 2020	RB	(England)	Jordan Hunter	(England) South Shields	Free transfer	
27 July 2020	DM	(England)	Bali Mumba	(England) Norwich City	Undisclosed	
8 January 2021	MF	(England)	Jay Turner-Cooke	(England) Newcastle United	Undisclosed	
20 January 2021	CB	(England)	Morgan Feeney	(England) Carlisle United	Free transfer	
1 February 2021	ST	(England)	Danny Graham	Retired	Retired	

== Pre-season friendlies ==
22 August 2020 Friendly	Gateshead	1–3	Sunderland	Gateshead
15:00 BST	Preston 24'	Report	Maguire 17'; Grigg 70'; Scowen 72'	Stadium: Gateshead International Stadium

25 August 2020 Friendly	Sunderland	3–1	Carlisle United	Sunderland
15:00 BST	Wyke 64', 80'; Maguire 70'	Report	Alessandra 52'	Stadium: Stadium of Light

29 August 2020 Friendly	Sunderland	1–0	Harrogate Town	Sunderland
15:00 BST	Grigg 84'	Report		Stadium: Stadium of Light

== Competitions ==
=== EFL League One ===
==== League table ====
Pos	Team	Pld	W	D	L	GF	GA	GD	Pts	Promotion, qualification or relegation
1	Hull City (C, P)	46	27	8	11	80	38	+42	89	Promotion to the EFL Championship
2	Peterborough United (P)	46	26	9	11	83	46	+37	87	Promotion to the EFL Championship
3	Blackpool (O, P)	46	23	11	12	60	37	+23	80	Qualification for League One play-offs
4	Sunderland	46	20	17	9	70	42	+28	77	Qualification for League One play-offs
5	Lincoln City	46	22	11	13	69	50	+19	77	Qualification for League One play-offs
6	Oxford United	46	22	8	16	77	56	+21	74	Qualification for League One play-offs
7	Charlton Athletic	46	20	14	12	70	56	+14	74	
8	Portsmouth	46	21	9	16	65	51	+14	72	

Source: EFL Official Website
Rules for classification: 1) Points; 2) Goal difference; 3) Number of goals scored; 4) Head-to-head results; 5) Wins; 6) Away goals; 7) Penalty points (sec 9.5); 8) 12-point sending off offences
(C) Champions; (O) Play-off winners; (P) Promoted

==== Results summary ====
Overall								Home						Away					
Pld	W	D	L	GF	GA	GD	Pts	W	D	L	GF	GA	GD	W	D	L	GF	GA	GD
46	20	17	9	70	42	+28	77	9	8	6	32	25	+7	11	9	3	38	17	+21

Last updated: 1 May 2021.
Source: BBC

==== Results by matchday ====
Matchday	1	2	3	4	5	6	7	8	9	10	11	12	13	14	15	16	17	18	19	20	21	22	23	24	25	26	27	28	29	30	31	32	33	34	35	36	37	38	39	40	41	42	43	44	45	46
Ground	H	A	H	A	A	H	H	A	A	H	H	A	A	H	H	A	H	A	H	A	H	H	A	H	A	A	H	A	H	A	H	H	A	A	H	A	H	A	H	A	A	A	H	H	A	H
Result	D	W	W	D	W	W	L	D	W	W	L	D	D	D	L	W	D	D	D	W	L	W	W	D	D	L	W	W	W	D	W	W	W	W	D	W	W	D	L	L	L	D	D	L	W	D
Position	14	5	5	4	5	5	6	7	6	6	6	8	8	7	9	8	9	11	10	8	9	7	7	6	7	7	6	6	5	5	4	4	4	3	3	3	3	3	3	3	3	3	3	4	3	4
Points	1	4	7	8	11	14	14	15	18	21	21	22	23	24	24	27	28	29	30	33	33	36	39	40	41	41	44	47	50	51	54	57	60	63	64	67	70	71	71	71	71	72	73	73	76	77

Updated to match(es) played on 9 May 2021. Source: 11v11 for league tables and fixtures
A = Away; H = Home; W = Win; D = Draw; L = Loss

==== Matches ====
Win Draw Loss Postponed

The 2020–21 season fixtures were released on 21 August.

12 September 2020 1	Sunderland	1–1	Bristol Rovers	Sunderland
15:00 GMT	Maguire 82'	Report	Leahy 3' (pen.)	Stadium: Stadium of Light; Referee: Anthony Backhouse

19 September 2020 2	Oxford United	0–2	Sunderland	Oxford
15:00 GMT		Report	O'Nien 47'; Gooch 82'	Stadium: Kassam Stadium; Attendance: 0 Referee: Darren Drysdale

26 September 2020 3	Sunderland	1–0	Peterborough United	Sunderland
15:00 GMT	Leadbitter 81' (pen.)	Report		Stadium: Stadium of Light; Attendance: 0 Referee: Scott Oldham

4 October 2020 4	Charlton Athletic	0–0	Sunderland	Charlton
15:00 GMT		Report		Stadium: The Valley; Attendance: 0 Referee: Andy Davies

17 October 2020 5	Swindon Town	0–2	Sunderland	Swindon
15:00 GMT		Report	Wyke 37'; Maguire 57' (pen.)	Stadium: County Ground; Attendance: 0 Referee: Ben Toner

20 October 2020 6	Sunderland	1–0	Crewe Alexandra	Sunderland
19:00 GMT	Offord 45+1' (o.g.)	Report		Stadium: Stadium of Light; Referee: Neil Hair

24 October 2020 7	Sunderland	1–3	Portsmouth	Sunderland
15:00 GMT	Wyke 10'	Report	Harness 7'; Marquis 25', 85' (pen.)	Stadium: Stadium of Light; Attendance: 0 Referee: Robert Lewis

27 October 2020 8	Rochdale	2–2	Sunderland	Rochdale
19:45 GMT	Lund 25', 44'	Report	Wyke 15'; Wright 40'	Stadium: Spotland Stadium; Referee: James Bell

31 October 2020 9	Gillingham	0–2	Sunderland	Gillingham
13:00 GMT		Report	Maguire 84' (pen.); Gooch 90+4'	Stadium: Priestfield Stadium; Attendance: 0 Referee: Sam Purkiss

3 November 2020 10	Sunderland	2–1	Ipswich Town	Sunderland
19:00 GMT	Wyke 8'; Leadbitter 84' (pen.)	Report	Lankester 38'	Stadium: Stadium of Light; Attendance: 0 Referee: Peter Wright

14 November 2020 11	Sunderland	1–2	Milton Keynes Dons	Sunderland
15:00 GMT	Power 12'	Report	Jerome 16'; Fraser 47' (pen.)	Stadium: Stadium of Light; Attendance: 0 Referee: Steve Martin

21 November 2020 12	Doncaster Rovers	1–1	Sunderland	Doncaster
15:00 GMT	Okenabirhie 90+3'	Report	Leadbitter 43'	Stadium: Keepmoat Stadium; Referee: John Busby

27 November 2020 13	Fleetwood Town	1–1	Sunderland	Fleetwood
19:45 GMT	Connolly 74'	Report	Wyke 59'	Stadium: Highbury Stadium; Attendance: 0 Referee: Bobby Madley

1 December 2020 14	Sunderland	1–1	Burton Albion	Sunderland
19:00 GMT	Power 85'	Report	Edwards (yellow card) 31'; Vernam 60'; Gallacher (yellow card) 90+2'	Stadium: Stadium of Light; Attendance: 0 Referee: Chris Sarginson

5 December 2020 15	Sunderland	0–1	Wigan Athletic	Sunderland
15:00 GMT	Maguire (yellow card) 90+1'	Report	Joseph 16'	Stadium: Stadium of Light; Attendance: 0 Referee: Trevor Kettle

12 December 2020 16	Lincoln City	0–4	Sunderland	Lincoln
15:00 GMT	Montsma (yellow card) 19'	Report	Leadbitter 16' (pen.) (yellow card) 90'; Wyke 25', 72'; Diamond (yellow card) 27' (goal) 42'; McLaughlin (yellow card) 51'	Stadium: Sincil Bank; Attendance: 0 Referee: Charles Breakspeare

15 December 2020 17	Sunderland	1–1	AFC Wimbledon	Sunderland
19:00 GMT	Wright 62'	Report	Pigott 42' (pen.); Reilly (yellow card) 49'; Longman (yellow card) 70'	Stadium: Stadium of Light; Attendance: 0 Referee: James Oldham

2 January 2021 18	Northampton Town	0–0	Sunderland	Northampton
15:00 GMT	Watson (yellow card) 40'	Report	Wyke (yellow card) 13'; Scowen (yellow card) 44'; Maguire (yellow card) 74'	Stadium: PTS Academy Stadium; Attendance: 0 Referee: Leigh Doughty

9 January 2021 19	Sunderland	1–1	Hull City	Sunderland
19:45 GMT	Wright (yellow card) 14'; McGeady 21'	Report	Burke 13'; Honeyman (yellow card) 45+3'	Stadium: Stadium of Light; Attendance: 0 Referee: Scott Oldham

16 January 2021 20	AFC Wimbledon	0–3	Sunderland	Wimbledon
15:00 GMT	Rudoni (yellow card) 27'	Report	Wyke 7', 87', 90+1'	Stadium: Plough Lane; Attendance: 0 Referee: Antony Coggins

19 January 2021 21	Sunderland	1–2	Plymouth Argyle	Sunderland
19:00 GMT	Winchester (yellow card) 28'; O'Brien 51', (yellow card) 54'	Report	Lewis 11', (yellow card) 46'; Edwards 56'; Cooper (yellow card) 83'	Stadium: Stadium of Light; Attendance: 0 Referee: Robert Lewis

23 January 2021 22	Sunderland	1–0	Shrewsbury Town	Sunderland
15:00 GMT	Wyke 18'; McGeady (yellow card) 28'; Leadbitter (yellow card) 76'	Report	Pierre (yellow card) 74'; Vela (yellow card) 90+2'	Stadium: Stadium of Light; Attendance: 0 Referee: Sam Barrott

26 January 2021 23	Ipswich Town	0–1	Sunderland	Ipswich
19:45 GMT	Jackson (red card) 10'; Ward (yellow card) 70'; Dozzell (yellow card) 82'	Report	Winchester (yellow card) 40'; Wyke 45+1'	Stadium: Portman Road; Attendance: 0 Referee: Charles Breakspear

30 January 2021 24	Sunderland	2–2	Gillingham	Sunderland
13:00 GMT	McGeady 6'; Leadbitter (penalty missed) 43' 43'	Report	MacDonald 28'; Slattery (yellow card) 87'; Graham 90'	Stadium: Stadium of Light; Attendance: 0 Referee: Oliver Langford

6 February 2021 25	Milton Keynes Dons	2–2	Sunderland	Milton Keynes
15:00 GMT	Mason 9'; Jerome 19', (yellow card) 53'; Laird (yellow card) 62'; Surman (yellow card) 83'	Report	Wyke 5'; O'Nien (yellow card) 49', (goal) 56'; Leadbitter (yellow card) 67'; Power (yellow card) 72'; Scowen (yellow card) 90+4'	Stadium: Stadium MK; Attendance: 0 Referee: Tom Nield

9 February 2021 26	Shrewsbury Town	2–1	Sunderland	Shrewsbury
19:00 GMT	Ebanks-Landell 52'; Chapman 67'; Love (yellow card) 78'	Report	O'Brien 21'	Stadium: Montgomery Waters Meadow; Attendance: 0 Referee: Will Finnie

13 February 2021 27	Sunderland	4–1	Doncaster Rovers	Sunderland
15:00 GMT	Wyke 7', 12', 31', 54'; O'Nien (yellow card) 59'	Report	Burge 53' (o.g.); Taylor (penalty missed) 57'; Lokilo (penalty missed) 88'	Stadium: Stadium of Light; Referee: Neil Hair

20 February 2021 28	Burton Albion	0–3	Sunderland	Burton
15:00 GMT	Earl (yellow card) 5' (yellow-red card) 56'; Clare (yellow card) 52'; Carter (yellow card) 65'; Mike Fondop-Talum (yellow card) 89'	Report	Leadbitter 6'; McGeady (yellow card) 18'; Gooch 32' (yellow card) 38'; O'Brien (yellow card) 56'; Wyke 76'	Stadium: Pirelli Stadium; Attendance: 0 Referee: Craig Hicks

23 February 2021 29	Sunderland	2–0	Fleetwood Town	Sunderland
19:00 GMT	Sanderson (yellow card) 38'; O'Brien 61'; Power 82'; McLaughlin (yellow card) 90'	Report		Stadium: Stadium of Light; Attendance: 0 Referee: James Bell

27 February 2021 30	Crewe Alexandra	2–2	Sunderland	Crewe
15:00 GMT	Porter 30'; Lowery 38'	Report	McFadzean (yellow card) 36'; Jones 76'; Maguire 90+7'	Stadium: Alexandra Stadium; Attendance: 0 Referee: Chris Sarginson

2 March 2021 31	Sunderland	1–0	Swindon Town	Sunderland
19:45 GMT	Wyke 70'	Report		Stadium: Stadium of Light; Referee: Peter Wright

6 March 2021 32	Sunderland	2–0	Rochdale	Sunderland
15:00 GMT	Sanderson 7'; McFadzean (yellow card) 14'; Wyke 35'; Jones (yellow card) 45'	Report	McLaughlin (yellow card) 6'; Baah (yellow card) 58'; Newby (yellow card) 90+9'	Stadium: Stadium of Light; Referee: Ross Joyce

9 March 2021 33	Portsmouth	0–2	Sunderland	Milton
19:45 GMT		Report	Wyke 13'; Jones 58'; Sanderson (yellow card) 66'	Stadium: Fratton Park; Attendance: 0 Referee: David Rock

17 March 2021 34	Accrington Stanley	0–2	Sunderland	Accrington
19:00 GMT	Nottingham (yellow card) 20'; Smyth (yellow card) 53'	Report	Gooch (yellow card) 45+1'; McGeady (yellow card) 58'; Stewart 62'; Wyke 86'	Stadium: Wham Stadium; Attendance: 0 Referee: John Busby

20 March 2021 35	Sunderland	1–1	Lincoln City	Sunderland
15:00 GMT	Wyke (yellow card) 34'; McFadzean 40'; Power (yellow card) 42'; McLaughlin (yellow card) 87'	Report	Morton 63'; Bridcutt (yellow card) 77'	Stadium: Stadium of Light; Attendance: 0 Referee: Carl Boyeson

27 March 2021 36	Bristol Rovers	0–1	Sunderland	Bristol
15:00 GMT	Leahy (yellow card) 36'	Report	O'Brien 39'; Scowen (yellow card) 50'; Sanderson (yellow card) 53'; O'Nien (yellow card) 85'	Stadium: Memorial Stadium; Attendance: 0 Referee: Ollie Yates

2 April 2021 37	Sunderland	3–1	Oxford United	Sunderland
15:00 GMT	McLaughlin (yellow card) 19'; Gooch 45+2'; McGeady 81'; McGeady (yellow card) 89'; Power 90+4' (yellow card) 90+5'	Report	Henry 21'; Sykes (yellow card) 25' (yellow-red card) 61'; Barker (yellow card) 25'; Henry (yellow card) 54'; Moore (yellow card) 81'	Stadium: Stadium of Light; Attendance: 0 Referee: Trevor Kettle

5 April 2021 38	Peterborough	1–1	Sunderland	Peterborough
15:00 GMT	Reed (yellow card) 18'; Butler (yellow card) 38'; Dembélé 66'	Report	McGeady 81'	Stadium: London Road Stadium; Attendance: 0 Referee: Craig Hicks

10 April 2021 39	Sunderland	1–2	Charlton Athletic	Sunderland
15:00 GMT	Scowen 77'	Report	Scowen 31' (o.g.); Forster-Caskey (yellow card) 49'; Gilbey (yellow card) 57', (goal) 61'	Stadium: Stadium of Light; Attendance: 0 Referee: Anthony Backhouse

13 April 2021 40	Wigan Athletic	2–1	Sunderland	Wigan
18:00 BST	Keane (yellow card) 38', (goal) 42'; Lang (yellow card) 50', (goal) 58'; Robinson (yellow card) 90'	Report	Wyke 32'; O'Nien (yellow card) 46'	Stadium: DW Stadium; Attendance: 0 Referee: Gavin Ward

17 April 2021 41	Blackpool	1–0	Sunderland	Blackpool
12:30 GMT	Dougall (yellow card) 27'; Garbutt 58'	Report	McFadzean (yellow card) 18'; Leadbitter (yellow card) 37'	Stadium: Bloomfield Road; Attendance: 0 Referee: Tom Nield

20 April 2021 42	Hull City	2–2	Sunderland	Kingston upon Hull
19:45 GMT	Magennis 28', 64'; Lewis-Potter (yellow card) 50'; Wilks (yellow card) 61'	Report	Jones 10'; Wright (yellow card) 16'; Wyke (yellow card) 20'; Leadbitter 34' (pen.); O'Nien (yellow card) 89'	Stadium: KCOM Stadium; Attendance: 0 Referee: Ollie Yates

24 April 2021 43	Sunderland	3–3	Accrington Stanley	Sunderland
15:00 BST	Wyke 6', 11'; Winchester (yellow card) 43'; Leadbitter (yellow card) 62'; Power 83'	Report	Bishop 51'; O'Nien 68' (o.g.); Nottingham (yellow card) 80'; McConville 85'; Smyth (yellow card) 87'	Stadium: Stadium of Light; Attendance: 0 Referee: Darren Drysdale

27 April 2021 44	Sunderland	0–1	Blackpool	Sunderland
19:00 BST	McGeady (yellow card) 64'	Report	Kaikai 56'; Ballard (yellow card) 87'	Stadium: Stadium of Light; Attendance: 0 Referee: Will Finnie

1 May 2021 45	Plymouth Argyle	1–3	Sunderland	Plymouth
15:00 GMT	Camará (yellow card) 42'; Law (yellow card) 49'; Opoku (yellow card) 54' (yellow-red card) 64'; Edwards 63' (yellow card) 76'	Report	Stewart 21'; Maguire 84' (pen.); Hume 84'	Stadium: Home Park; Attendance: 0 Referee: James Bell

9 May 2021 46	Sunderland	1–1	Northampton Town	Sunderland
15:00 GMT	O'Nien (yellow card) 59'; Wright (yellow card) 83'; Winchester 87'	Report	Miller (yellow card) 21'; Hoskins 84'	Stadium: Stadium of Light; Attendance: 0 Referee: Sam Barrott

=== Play-offs ===
19 May 2021 Semi Final First Leg	Lincoln City	2–0	Sunderland	Lincoln
18:00 BST	Hopper 51'; Bridcutt (yellow card) 71'; Johnson 76'; Grant (yellow card) 86'	Report	O'Nien (yellow card) 61'	Stadium: Sincil Bank; Attendance: 3,000; Referee: Craig Hicks

22 May 2021 Semi Final Second Leg	Sunderland	2–1 (2–3 agg.)	Lincoln City	Sunderland
15:30 BST	Stewart 13'; Wyke 33'; Scowen (yellow card) 36'; Leadbitter (yellow card) 67'	Report	Johnson (yellow card) 52'; Hopper 56'; Grant (penalty missed) 63'; Edun (yellow card) 83'	Stadium: Stadium of Light; Referee: Michael Salisbury

=== FA Cup ===
Win Draw Loss

The draw for the first round was made on Monday 26, October.

8 November 2020 First round	Sunderland	0–1	Mansfield Town	Sunderland
15:00 GMT		Report	Lapslie 49'	Stadium: Stadium of Light; Attendance: 0 Referee: Anthony Backhouse

=== EFL Cup ===
Win Draw Loss

The first round draw was made on 18 August, live on Sky Sports, by Paul Merson.

5 September 2020 First round	Sunderland	0–0 (4–5 p)	Hull City	Sunderland
15:00 BST		Report		Stadium: Stadium of Light; Attendance: 0 Referee: Thomas Bramall
	Penalties
	Grigg (penalty missed); Power (penalty scored); O'Nien (penalty scored); Gooch (penalty scored); Wyke (penalty scored)		Wilks (penalty scored); Smallwood (penalty scored); Samuelsen (penalty scored); Honeyman (penalty scored); Lewis-Potter (penalty scored)

=== EFL Trophy ===
Win Draw Loss

The regional group stage draw was confirmed on 18 August. The second round draw was made by Matt Murray on 20 November, at St Andrew's. The third round draw was made on 10 December 2020 by Jon Parkin. The Quarter Final draw was made on 23 January 2021 by Sam Parkin. The Semi Final draw was made on 5 February 2021 by Adebayo Akinfenwa.

Pos	Div	Team	Pld	W	PW	PL	L	GF	GA	GD	Pts	Qualification
1	L1	Fleetwood Town	3	3	0	0	0	8	2	+6	9	Advance to Round 2
2	L1	Sunderland	3	2	0	0	1	14	6	+8	6	Advance to Round 2
3	L2	Carlisle United	3	1	0	0	2	7	9	−2	3	
4	ACA	Aston Villa U21	3	0	0	0	3	2	14	−12	0	

Source: EFL.com

8 September 2020 Group Game 1	Sunderland	8–1	Aston Villa U21	Sunderland
19:00 BST	Wyke 15', 50'; Feeney 21'; Scowen 75'; Power 77'; Graham 82'; Dobson 84'; O'Brien 90'	Report	Vassilev 47' (pen.)	Stadium: Stadium of Light

6 October 2020 Group Game 2	Sunderland	5–3	Carlisle United	Sunderland
19:00 BST	Maguire 26', 54'; Hume 37'; Wyke 69'; Diamond 90+1'	Report	Alessandra 6' (pen.); Mellish 72', 82'	Stadium: Stadium of Light; Attendance: 0 Referee: Bobby Madley

10 November 2020 Group Game 3	Fleetwood Town	2–1	Sunderland	Fleetwood
19:45 BST	McKay 51'; Duffy 59'	Report	Hill 15' (o.g.)	Stadium: Highbury Stadium; Referee: Graham Salisbury

8 December 2020 Second round	Oldham Athletic	1–2	Sunderland	Oldham
18:00 GMT	Grant 13' (yellow card) 83'; Diarra (yellow card) 64'	Report	Maguire 30'; Scowen 64'; Wright (yellow card) 83'	Stadium: Boundary Park; Attendance: 0 Referee: Sam Barrott

12 January 2021 Third round	Sunderland	2–0	Port Vale	Sunderland
18:00 GMT	O'Brien 21'; McFadzean (yellow card) 54'; Wright (yellow card) 56'; McGeady 90+7' (pen.)	Report	Conlon (yellow card) 8'	Stadium: Stadium of Light; Attendance: 0 Referee: Declan Bourne

2 February 2021 Quarter Final	Milton Keynes Dons	0–3	Sunderland	Milton Keynes
18:30 GMT	Harvie (yellow card) 56'; Gladwin (yellow card) 69'	Report	Lewington 12' (o.g.); McGeady 76'; Wyke 82'	Stadium: Stadium MK; Attendance: 0 Referee: Thomas Bramall

17 February 2021 Semi Final	Sunderland	1–1 (5–3 p)	Lincoln City	Sunderland
18:00 GMT	Scowen (yellow card) 54'; McLaughlin (yellow card) 67'; Wyke 75'	Report	Edun (yellow card) 24'; Scully 64'; Johnson (yellow card) 77'	Stadium: Stadium of Light; Attendance: 0 Referee: Ben Toner
	Penalties
	Power (penalty scored); O'Nien (penalty scored); Maguire (penalty scored); McGeady (penalty scored); Leadbitter (penalty scored)		Scully (penalty scored); McGrandles (penalty scored); Howarth (penalty missed); Johnson (penalty scored)

14 March 2021 Final	Sunderland	1–0	Tranmere Rovers	London
15:00 GMT	Gooch 57'	Report		Stadium: Wembley Stadium; Attendance: 0 Referee: Charles Breakspear

=== Appearances and goals ===
As of 22 May 2021

No.	Pos	Nat	Player	Total		League One		FA Cup		EFL Cup		EFL Trophy		Play-offs	
No.	Pos	Nat	Player	Apps	Goals	Apps	Goals	Apps	Goals	Apps	Goals	Apps	Goals	Apps	Goals
1	GK	(England) ENG	Lee Burge	46	0	41	0	0	0	1	0	2	0	2	0
2	DF	(Northern Ireland) NIR	Conor McLaughlin	29	0	22+3	0	1	0	0	0	1+2	0	0	0
3	DF	(Northern Ireland) NIR	Tom Flanagan	23	0	14+2	0	1	0	1	0	3	0	1+1	0
4	DF	(England) ENG	Jordan Willis	20	0	14+1	0	0	0	1	0	3+1	0	0	0
5	DF	(Australia) AUS	Bailey Wright	40	2	33	2	0	0	1	0	4	0	2	0
6	MF	(England) ENG	Max Power	53	6	38+4	5	1	0	1	0	7	1	1+1	0
7	MF	(Scotland) SCO	Chris Maguire	41	8	11+22	5	1	0	1	0	4+1	3	1	0
8	MF	(England) ENG	George Dobson	11	1	3+2	0	1	0	1	0	2+2	1	0	0
9	FW	(England) ENG	Charlie Wyke	54	31	40+3	25	0+1	0	0+1	0	4+3	5	2	1
10	FW	(Republic of Ireland) IRL	Aiden O'Brien	41	6	22+10	4	0+1	0	1	0	3+3	2	0+1	0
11	MF	(United States) USA	Lynden Gooch	46	5	26+12	4	0	0	0+1	0	5	1	2	0
13	MF	(England) ENG	Luke O'Nien	45	2	34+4	2	0	0	1	0	4	0	2	0
14	MF	(England) ENG	Josh Scowen	51	3	35+8	1	0	0	0	0	6	2	2	0
15	DF	(England) ENG	Morgan Feeney	1	1	0	0	0	0	0	0	1	1	0	0
16	DF	(England) ENG	Dion Sanderson	27	1	19+7	1	1	0	0	0	0	0	0	0
17	MF	(England) ENG	Elliot Embleton	12	0	3+6	0	0+1	0	0	0	2	0	0	0
18	FW	(England) ENG	Danny Graham	17	1	3+11	0	1	0	0	0	0+2	1	0	0
19	DF	(Kosovo) KOS	Arbenit Xhemajli	1	0	0	0	0	0	0	0	1	0	0	0
20	GK	(England) ENG	Remi Matthews	11	0	5+1	0	1	0	0	0	4	0	0	0
21	MF	(England) ENG	Jack Diamond	35	2	11+13	1	1	0	0	0	5+3	1	0+2	0
22	FW	(England) ENG	Will Grigg	12	0	4+5	0	1	0	1	0	1	0	0	0
23	MF	(England) ENG	Grant Leadbitter	48	7	30+10	7	0	0	0	0	4+2	0	1+1	0
24	MF	(England) ENG	Daniel Neil	8	0	0+2	0	0	0	0	0	5+1	0	0	0
25	DF	(Scotland) SCO	Callum McFadzean	34	2	21+4	1	1	0	0	0	6	1	1+1	0
26	MF	(Northern Ireland) NIR	Carl Winchester	21	1	12+8	1	0	0	0	0	0	0	0+1	0
27	FW	(Northern Ireland) NIR	Jordan Jones	21	3	11+8	3	0	0	0	0	1	0	1	0
28	MF	(Republic of Ireland) IRL	Aiden McGeady	36	6	28+1	4	0	0	0	0	2+3	2	2	0
29	MF	(Scotland) SCO	Cieran Dunne	1	0	0	0	0	0	0	0	0+1	0	0	0
30	DF	(England) ENG	Jake Vokins	4	0	4	0	0	0	0	0	0	0	0	0
31	FW	(Scotland) SCO	Ross Stewart	13	3	2+9	2	0	0	0	0	0	0	1+1	1
33	DF	(England) ENG	Denver Hume	26	2	19+4	1	0	0	1	0	1	1	1	0
35	DF	(England) ENG	Ollie Younger	4	0	1	0	0	0	0	0	1+2	0	0	0
36	MF	(England) ENG	Sam Wilding	1	0	0	0	0	0	0	0	0+1	0	0	0
38	MF	(England) ENG	Vinnie Steels	1	0	0	0	0	0	0	0	0+1	0	0	0
40	DF	(England) ENG	Brandon Taylor	3	0	0	0	0	0	0	0	3	0	0	0
42	MF	(England) ENG	Josh Hawkes	1	0	0	0	0	0	0	0	1	0	0	0
43	GK	(England) ENG	Anthony Patterson	2	0	0	0	0	0	0	0	2	0	0	0
46	FW	(England) ENG	Mitchell Curry	1	0	0+1	0	0	0	0	0	0	0	0	0
