= 2020–21 EFL Cup =

Carabao Cup, League Cup

Tournament details
- Country: England; Wales
- Dates: 29 August 2020 – 25 April 2021
- Teams: 92

Final positions
- Champions: Manchester City (8th title)
- Runners-up: Tottenham Hotspur

Tournament statistics
- Matches played: 90
- Goals scored: 249 (2.77 per match)
- Top goal scorer(s): Tristan Abrahams; Sébastien Haller (4 goals each)

The 2020–21 EFL Cup was the 61st season of the EFL Cup (known as the Carabao Cup for sponsorship reasons), the competition is open to all clubs participating in the Premier League and the English Football League.

Manchester City were the three-time defending champions, having retained the trophy in 2020, defeating Aston Villa in the final at Wembley Stadium in London on 1 March 2020. This was the first season that the winner of the competition qualified for the play-off round of the newly introduced UEFA Europa Conference League rather than the second qualifying round of the UEFA Europa League. It was also the first season where the semi-finals were single matches, instead of two-legged fixtures.

Manchester City won a fourth consecutive title, defeating Tottenham Hotspur 1–0 in the final and equalling Liverpool's overall tally of eight titles.

== Access ==
All 92 clubs in the Premier League and English Football League entered the season's EFL Cup. Access was distributed across the top 4 leagues of the English football league system. For the first two rounds, the draw was regionalised into northern and southern clubs.

In the first round, 22 of 24 Championship clubs and all League One, and League Two clubs entered.

The following round, the two remaining Championship clubs Bournemouth and Watford (who finished 18th and 19th respectively in the 2019–20 Premier League season), and the Premier League clubs not involved in either the Champions League or Europa League entered.

Arsenal, Chelsea, Leicester City, Liverpool, Manchester City, Manchester United and Tottenham Hotspur all received byes to the third round owing to their participation in European competitions.

	Clubs entering in this round	Clubs advancing from previous round	Number of games
First round (70 clubs)	24 clubs from EFL League Two; 24 clubs from EFL League One; 22 clubs from EFL Championship	N/A	35
Second round (50 clubs)	2 clubs from EFL Championship; 13 Premier League clubs (not involved in European competition)	35 winners from first round	25
Third round (32 clubs)	7 Premier League clubs (involved in European competition)	25 winners from second round	16
Fourth round (16 clubs)	No clubs enter the fourth round	16 winners from third round	8
Quarter-finals (8 clubs)	No clubs enter the quarter-finals	8 winners from fourth round	4
Semi-finals (4 clubs)	No clubs enter the semi-finals	4 winners from fifth round	2
Final (2 clubs)	No clubs enter the final	2 winners from semi-finals	1

== First round ==
A total of 70 clubs played in the first round: 24 from League Two (tier 4), 24 from League One (tier 3), and 22 from the Championship (tier 2). The draw for this round was split on a geographical basis into 'northern' and 'southern' sections. Teams were drawn against a team from the same section. Matches were played on the weekend of 5 September 2020, however some matches were moved a week earlier due to that weekend being a FIFA international window. The draw was conducted on Sky Sports News by Paul Merson on 18 August 2020.

=== Northern section ===
29 August 2020	Preston North End (2)	4–0	Mansfield Town (4)	Preston
15:00 BST	Barkhuizen 14'; Maguire 22'; Bauer 29'; Harrop 65'	Report		Stadium: Deepdale; Attendance: 0 (Note: This match was played behind closed doors due to the COVID-19 pandemic in England.); Referee: Ross Joyce

29 August 2020	Blackburn Rovers (2)	3–2	Doncaster Rovers (3)	Blackburn
15:00 BST	Holtby 30'; Rankin-Costello 72'; Armstrong 81' (pen.)	Report	Okenabirhie 54' (pen.); Gomes 64'	Stadium: Ewood Park; Attendance: 0 Referee: Anthony Backhouse

29 August 2020	Stoke City (2)	0–0 (5–4 p)	Blackpool (3)	Stoke-on-Trent
15:00 BST		Report		Stadium: bet365 Stadium; Attendance: 0 Referee: James Adcock
	Penalties
	McClean (penalty missed); Campbell (penalty scored); Clucas (penalty scored); Thompson (penalty missed); Fletcher (penalty scored); Martins Indi (penalty scored); Oakley-Boothe (penalty scored)		(penalty missed) Sarkic; (penalty scored) Hamilton; (penalty missed) Anderson; (penalty scored) Robson; (penalty scored) Kaikai; (penalty scored) Husband; (penalty missed) Turton

4 September 2020	Middlesbrough (2)	4–3	Shrewsbury Town (3)	Middlesbrough
17:30 BST	Johnson 21'; Fletcher 31', 53'; Tavernier 65'	Report	High 13'; Cummings 60'; Pyke 73'	Stadium: Riverside Stadium; Attendance: 0 Referee: Michael Salisbury

4 September 2020	Burton Albion (3)	1–1 (4–2 p)	Accrington Stanley (3)	Burton upon Trent
19:30 BST	Akins 32'	Report	Burgess 82'	Stadium: Pirelli Stadium; Attendance: 0 Referee: Andy Haines
	Penalties
	Akins (penalty scored); Hemmings (penalty scored); Quinn (penalty scored); Eardley (penalty scored)		(penalty missed) Pritchard; (penalty missed) Butcher; (penalty scored) Sangare; (penalty scored) Charles

5 September 2020	Derby County (2)	0–0 (3–2 p)	Barrow (4)	Derby
12:00 BST		Report		Stadium: Pride Park Stadium; Attendance: 0 Referee: Oliver Yates
	Penalties
	Evans (penalty scored); Marriott (penalty missed); Bird (penalty missed); Shinnie (penalty scored); Whittaker (penalty scored)		(penalty scored) Angus; (penalty missed) Beadling; (penalty missed) Hardcastle; (penalty scored) Biggins; (penalty missed) Hindle

5 September 2020	Walsall (4)	0–0 (2–4 p)	Sheffield Wednesday (2)	Walsall
14:15 BST		Report		Stadium: Bescot Stadium; Attendance: 0 Referee: Peter Wright
	Penalties
	Holden (penalty scored); Gordon (penalty missed); Adebayo (penalty scored); Bates (penalty missed)		(penalty scored) Bannan; (penalty scored) Windass; (penalty scored) Harris; (penalty scored) Brown

5 September 2020	Tranmere Rovers (4)	1–1 (7–8 p)	Harrogate Town (4)	Birkenhead
15:00 BST	Vaughan 64'	Report	Kerry 69'	Stadium: Prenton Park; Attendance: 0 Referee: Tom Nield
	Penalties
	Vaughan (penalty missed); Khan (penalty scored); Banks (penalty scored); Macdonald (penalty scored); Spearing (penalty missed); Morris (penalty scored); Payne (penalty scored); Clarke (penalty scored); O'Connor (penalty scored); Monthé (penalty missed)		(penalty missed) Thomson; (penalty scored) Stead; (penalty scored) Muldoon; (penalty missed) Beck; (penalty scored) Burrell; (penalty scored) Smith; (penalty scored) Hall; (penalty scored) Fallowfield; (penalty scored) Kerry; (penalty scored) Falkingham

5 September 2020	Crewe Alexandra (3)	1–2	Lincoln City (3)	Crewe
15:00 BST	Sass-Davies 55'	Report	Hopper 52'; Montsma 66'	Stadium: Gresty Road; Attendance: 0 Referee: Scott Oldham

5 September 2020	Huddersfield Town (2)	0–1	Rochdale (3)	Huddersfield (Note: The match would have been held at Spotland Stadium in Rochdale, but was reversed due to renovations of its pitch.)
15:00 BST		Report	O'Connell 51'	Stadium: Kirklees Stadium; Attendance: 0 Referee: Ben Toner

5 September 2020	Bolton Wanderers (4)	1–2	Bradford City (4)	Horwich
15:00 BST	Sarcevic 47'	Report	Novak 26'; Pritchard 75'	Stadium: University of Bolton Stadium; Attendance: 0 Referee: Martin Coy

5 September 2020	Fleetwood Town (3)	3–2	Wigan Athletic (3)	Fleetwood
15:00 BST	Evans 41', 77'; J. Morris 64'	Report	Garner 2', 31' (pen.)	Stadium: Highbury Stadium; Attendance: 0 Referee: Seb Stockbridge

5 September 2020	Grimsby Town (4)	1–1 (3–4 p)	Morecambe (4)	Cleethorpes
15:00 BST	Green 35'	Report	Phillips 7'	Stadium: Blundell Park; Attendance: 0 Referee: Graham Salisbury
	Penalties
	Pollock (penalty scored); Tilley (penalty missed); Preston (penalty scored); Edwards (penalty scored); McKeown (penalty missed)		(penalty missed) Kenyon; (penalty scored) McAlinden; (penalty scored) Hendrie; (penalty scored) Pringle; (penalty scored) O'Sullivan

5 September 2020	Scunthorpe United (4)	1–2	Port Vale (4)	Scunthorpe
15:00 BST	Loft 69'	Report	Mills 45+5'; Robinson 90+3'	Stadium: Glanford Park; Attendance: 0 Referee: Neil Hair

5 September 2020	Sunderland (3)	0–0 (4–5 p)	Hull City (3)	Sunderland
15:00 BST		Report		Stadium: Stadium of Light; Attendance: 0 Referee: Thomas Bramall
	Penalties
	Grigg (penalty missed); Power (penalty scored); O'Nien (penalty scored); Gooch (penalty scored); Wyke (penalty scored)		(penalty scored) Wilks; (penalty scored) Smallwood; (penalty scored) Samuelsen; (penalty scored) Honeyman; (penalty scored) Lewis-Potter

5 September 2020	Salford City (4)	1–1 (4–2 p)	Rotherham United (2)	Salford
15:00 BST	Henderson 84' (pen.)	Report	Crooks 90+6'	Stadium: Moor Lane; Attendance: 0 Referee: James Oldham
	Penalties
	Touray (penalty scored); Henderson (penalty scored); Gibson (penalty scored); Thomas-Asante (penalty scored)		(penalty missed) Vassell; (penalty scored) Ladapo; (penalty scored) Sadlier; (penalty missed) Mattock

5 September 2020	Barnsley (2)	1–0	Nottingham Forest (2)	Barnsley
15:00 BST	Woodrow 49'	Report		Stadium: Oakwell; Attendance: 0 Referee: Marc Edwards

5 September 2020	Oldham Athletic (4)	3–0	Carlisle United (4)	Oldham
15:00 BST	Garrity 29'; Grant 37'; McAleny 89'	Report		Stadium: Boundary Park; Attendance: 0 Referee: Carl Boyeson

=== Southern section ===
29 August 2020	Stevenage (4)	3–3 (1–3 p)	Portsmouth (3)	Stevenage
15:00 BST	List 9'; Carter 10'; Cuthbert 29'	Report	Curtis 21'; Evans 45+2'; Marquis 51'	Stadium: Broadhall Way; Attendance: 0 Referee: Sam Purkiss
	Penalties
	Effiong (penalty scored); Newton (penalty missed); Osborne (penalty missed); Coker (penalty missed)		(penalty scored) Marquis; (penalty scored) Curtis; (penalty scored) Brown

5 September 2020	Plymouth Argyle (3)	3–2	Queens Park Rangers (2)	Plymouth
12:30 BST	Edwards 32'; Mayor 55'; Nouble 78'	Report	Manning 2'; Kakay 57'	Stadium: Home Park; Attendance: 0 Referee: Anthony Coggins

5 September 2020	Crawley Town (4)	1–3	Millwall (2)	Crawley
13:00 BST	Ashford 33'	Report	Malone 14'; Tunnicliffe 31' (o.g.); Smith 59'	Stadium: Broadfield Stadium; Attendance: 0 Referee: David Rock

5 September 2020	Gillingham (3)	1–0	Southend United (4)	Gillingham
13:00 BST	Ogilvie 27'	Report		Stadium: Priestfield Stadium; Attendance: 0 Referee: Chris Pollard

5 September 2020	Bristol City (2)	2–0	Exeter City (4)	Bristol
14:00 BST	Paterson 35'; Semenyo 83'	Report		Stadium: Ashton Gate Stadium; Attendance: 0 Referee: Chris Sarginson

5 September 2020	Swindon Town (3)	1–3	Charlton Athletic (3)	Swindon
15:00 BST	J. Smith 64'	Report	Bonne 36'; Barker 74'; Aneke 90'	Stadium: County Ground; Attendance: 0 Referee: Brett Huxtable

5 September 2020	Forest Green Rovers (4)	1–2	Leyton Orient (4)	Nailsworth
15:00 BST	Happe 23' (o.g.)	Report	Johnson 49'; Wilkinson 52'	Stadium: The New Lawn; Attendance: 0 Referee: Craig Hicks

5 September 2020	Milton Keynes Dons (3)	0–1	Coventry City (2)	Milton Keynes
15:00 BST		Report	Walker 82'	Stadium: Stadium MK; Attendance: 0 Referee: Trevor Kettle

5 September 2020	Peterborough United (3)	0–1	Cheltenham Town (4)	Peterborough
15:00 BST		Report	Sercombe 59'	Stadium: London Road Stadium; Attendance: 0 Referee: Alan Young

5 September 2020	Northampton Town (3)	3–0	Cardiff City (2)	Northampton
15:00 BST	Smith 33'; Warburton 49'; Watson 59'	Report		Stadium: Sixfields Stadium; Attendance: 0 Referee: Darren Drysdale

5 September 2020	Luton Town (2)	3–1	Norwich City (2)	Luton
15:00 BST	Collins 79' (pen.), 83', 90+5'	Report	Dowell 81'	Stadium: Kenilworth Road; Attendance: 0 Referee: John Busby

5 September 2020	Birmingham City (2)	0–1	Cambridge United (4)	Birmingham
15:00 BST		Report	Cundy 18'	Stadium: St Andrew's; Attendance: 0 Referee: Leigh Doughty

5 September 2020	Newport County (4)	2–0	Swansea City (2)	Newport
15:00 BST	Abrahams 7', 45'	Report		Stadium: Rodney Parade; Attendance: 0 Referee: Kevin Johnson

5 September 2020	Oxford United (3)	1–1 (4–3 p)	AFC Wimbledon (3)	Oxford
15:00 BST	Brannagan 63'	Report	Taylor 68' (o.g.)	Stadium: Kassam Stadium; Attendance: 0 Referee: Lee Swabey
	Penalties
	Forde (penalty scored); McGuane (penalty scored); Henry (penalty missed); Taylor (penalty scored); Brannagan (penalty scored)		(penalty scored) O'Neill; (penalty missed) Reilly; (penalty missed) Guinness-Walker; (penalty scored) Alexander; (penalty scored) Pigott

5 September 2020	Reading (2)	3–1	Colchester United (4)	Reading
15:00 BST	Lucas João 45+1', 56', 75'	Report	Brown 37'	Stadium: Madejski Stadium; Attendance: 0 Referee: Joshua Smith

5 September 2020	Ipswich Town (3)	3–0	Bristol Rovers (3)	Ipswich
15:00 BST	Sears 29', 68'; Chambers 44'	Report		Stadium: Portman Road; Attendance: 0 Referee: Will Finnie

6 September 2020	Brentford (2)	1–1 (4–2 p)	Wycombe Wanderers (2)	Brentford, London
12:00 BST	Pinnock 32'	Report	Horgan 76'	Stadium: Brentford Community Stadium; Attendance: 0 Referee: Charles Breakspear
	Penalties
	Toney (penalty scored); Žambůrek (penalty scored); Jensen (penalty missed); Canós (penalty scored); Forss (penalty scored)		(penalty scored) Jacobson; (penalty missed) Freeman; (penalty scored) Horgan; (penalty missed) Kashket

== Second round ==
A total of 50 teams played in the second round; the 35 winners from the first round were joined with Bournemouth and Watford from the Championship, as well as the 13 Premier League clubs that were not involved in European competitions. The draw for this round was split on a geographical basis into 'northern' and 'southern' sections. Teams were drawn against a team from the same section. The draw was made on 6 September 2020 by Phil Babb. The ties were played on the week commencing 14 September 2020.

=== Northern section ===
15 September 2020	Middlesbrough (2)	0–2	Barnsley (2)	Middlesbrough
18:00 BST		Report	Schmidt 22'; Williams 34'	Stadium: Riverside Stadium; Attendance: 0 Referee: Anthony Backhouse

15 September 2020	Derby County (2)	1–2	Preston North End (2)	Derby
18:30 BST	Knight 51'	Report	Barkhuizen 79'; Johnson 90+2' (pen.)	Stadium: Pride Park Stadium; Attendance: 0 Referee: Andy Davies

15 September 2020	Bradford City (4)	0–5	Lincoln City (3)	Bradford
19:00 BST		Report	French 4' (o.g.); Scully 6'; Montsma 29'; Jones 41'; Morton 90+3'	Stadium: Valley Parade; Attendance: 0 Referee: Geoff Eltringham

15 September 2020	Fleetwood Town (3)	2–1	Port Vale (4)	Fleetwood
19:00 BST	Madden 14'; J. Morris 75'	Report	Whitehead 49'	Stadium: Highbury Stadium; Attendance: 0 Referee: Ross Joyce

15 September 2020	Newcastle United (1)	1–0	Blackburn Rovers (2)	Newcastle upon Tyne
19:30 BST	Fraser 35'	Report		Stadium: St James' Park; Attendance: 0 Referee: Jarred Gillett

15 September 2020	Burton Albion (3)	1–3	Aston Villa (1)	Burton upon Trent
19:45 BST	Daniel 2'	Report	Watkins 39'; Grealish 88'; Davis 90+4'	Stadium: Pirelli Stadium; Attendance: 0 Referee: Oliver Langford

15 September 2020	Morecambe (4)	1–0	Oldham Athletic (4)	Morecambe
19:45 BST	Wildig 22'	Report		Stadium: Globe Arena; Attendance: 0 Referee: Ben Toner

15 September 2020	Rochdale (3)	0–2	Sheffield Wednesday (2)	Rochdale
19:45 BST		Report	Kachunga 54'; Windass 80'	Stadium: Spotland Stadium; Attendance: 0 Referee: Seb Stockbridge

16 September 2020	West Bromwich Albion (1)	3–0	Harrogate Town (4)	West Bromwich
18:00 BST	Harper 18'; Robson-Kanu 22'; Robinson 77'	Report		Stadium: The Hawthorns; Attendance: 0 Referee: Thomas Bramall

16 September 2020	Leeds United (1)	1–1 (8–9 p)	Hull City (3)	Leeds
19:45 BST	Alioski 90+3'	Report	Wilks 5'	Stadium: Elland Road; Attendance: 0 Referee: David Webb
	Penalties
	Rodrigo (penalty scored); Alioski (penalty missed); Roberts (penalty scored); Poveda (penalty scored); Douglas (penalty scored); Struijk (penalty scored); Davis (penalty scored); Gotts (penalty scored); Casilla (penalty scored); Shackleton (penalty missed)		(penalty scored) Docherty; (penalty scored) C. Jones; (penalty missed) Coyle; (penalty scored) Scott; (penalty scored) Mayer; (penalty scored) Elder; (penalty scored) McLoughlin; (penalty scored) Chadwick; (penalty scored) Batty; (penalty scored) A. Jones

16 September 2020	Everton (1)	3–0	Salford City (4)	Liverpool
20:15 BST	Keane 8'; Sigurðsson 74'; Kean 87' (pen.)	Report		Stadium: Goodison Park; Attendance: 0 Referee: Marc Edwards

17 September 2020	Burnley (1)	1–1 (5–4 p)	Sheffield United (1)	Burnley
17:30 BST	Vydra 67'	Report	McGoldrick 4'	Stadium: Turf Moor; Attendance: 0 Referee: Paul Tierney
	Penalties
	Wood (penalty scored); Vydra (penalty scored); Brownhill (penalty scored); Pieters (penalty scored); Brady (penalty scored)		(penalty scored) Norwood; (penalty missed) McBurnie; (penalty scored) Sharp; (penalty scored) Berge; (penalty scored) Osborn

=== Southern section ===
17 September 2020	Wolverhampton Wanderers (1)	0–1	Stoke City (2)	Wolverhampton
19:00 BST		Report	Brown 86'	Stadium: Molineux Stadium; Attendance: 0 Referee: Simon Hooper

16 September 2020	Southampton (1)	0–2	Brentford (2)	Southampton
19:45 BST		Report	Nørgaard 40'; Dasilva 45+1'	Stadium: St Mary's Stadium; Attendance: 0 Referee: John Brooks

15 September 2020	Gillingham (3)	1–1 (5–4 p)	Coventry City (2)	Gillingham
18:00 BST	Graham 90+4' (pen.)	Report	Biamou 61'	Stadium: Priestfield Stadium; Attendance: 0 Referee: Craig Hicks
	Penalties
	Ogilvie (penalty scored); Graham (penalty scored); Robertson (penalty scored); Mellis (penalty scored); Coyle (penalty scored)		(penalty scored) Walker; (penalty scored) Biamou; (penalty scored) Sheaf; (penalty missed) Rose; (penalty scored) Eccles

15 September 2020	Millwall (2)	3–1	Cheltenham Town (4)	Bermondsey, London
18:00 BST	Leonard 19'; Mahoney 49'; Smith 62'	Report	Azaz 69'	Stadium: The Den; Attendance: 0 Referee: John Busby

15 September 2020	Reading (2)	0–1	Luton Town (2)	Reading
18:00 BST		Report	Clark 24'	Stadium: Madejski Stadium; Attendance: 0 Referee: Charles Breakspear

15 September 2020	Newport County (4)	1–0	Cambridge United (4)	Newport
19:00 BST	Twine 80'	Report		Stadium: Rodney Parade; Attendance: 0 Referee: Lee Swabey

15 September 2020	Oxford United (3)	1–1 (0–3 p)	Watford (2)	Oxford
19:00 BST	Hall 26'	Report	Sema 89'	Stadium: Kassam Stadium; Attendance: 0 Referee: Leigh Doughty
	Penalties
	Forde (penalty missed); McGuane (penalty missed); Hall (penalty missed)		(penalty scored) Sema; (penalty scored) Quina; (penalty scored) Perica

15 September 2020	West Ham United (1)	3–0	Charlton Athletic (3)	Stratford, London
19:30 BST	Haller 22', 26'; Felipe Anderson 80'	Report		Stadium: London Stadium; Attendance: 0 Referee: Andre Marriner

15 September 2020	Bournemouth (2)	0–0 (11–10 p)	Crystal Palace (1)	Boscombe, Bournemouth
19:45 BST		Report		Stadium: Dean Court; Attendance: 0 Referee: Keith Stroud
	Penalties
	Brooks (penalty scored); Surridge (penalty scored); Billing (penalty scored); Kelly (penalty scored); Solanke (penalty scored); Simpson (penalty scored); Gosling (penalty scored); Lerma (penalty scored); Ofoborh (penalty scored); Zemura (penalty scored); Begović (penalty missed); Brooks (penalty scored)		(penalty scored) Milivojević; (penalty scored) Batshuayi; (penalty scored) Townsend; (penalty scored) Eze; (penalty scored) Ayew; (penalty scored) Meyer; (penalty scored) Sakho; (penalty scored) Kelly; (penalty scored) Inniss; (penalty scored) Jach; (penalty missed) Hennessey; (penalty missed) Milivojević

15 September 2020	Leyton Orient (4)	3–2	Plymouth Argyle (3)	Leyton, London
19:45 BST	Dennis 55'; McAnuff 74'; Johnson 90+3'	Report	Camará 19'; Watts 34'	Stadium: Brisbane Road; Attendance: 0 Referee: Joshua Smith

16 September 2020	Ipswich Town (3)	0–1	Fulham (1)	Ipswich
19:00 BST		Report	Mitrović 38'	Stadium: Portman Road; Attendance: 0 Referee: Dean Whitestone

16 September 2020	Bristol City (2)	4–0	Northampton Town (3)	Bristol
19:45 BST	Martin 43'; Palmer 48', 88'; Semenyo 82'	Report		Stadium: Ashton Gate Stadium; Attendance: 0 Referee: Kevin Johnson

17 September 2020	Brighton & Hove Albion (1)	4–0	Portsmouth (3)	Brighton
19:45 BST	Mac Allister 38'; Jahanbakhsh 54'; Bernardo 58'; Gyökeres 71'	Report		Stadium: Falmer Stadium; Attendance: 0 Referee: Matt Donohue

== Third round ==
A total of 32 teams played in this round. Arsenal, Chelsea, Leicester City, Liverpool, Manchester City, Manchester United, and Tottenham Hotspur entered in this round due to their European qualification and would join the 25 winners of the second round. The draw was made on 6 September 2020 by Phil Babb. The ties were played on the week commencing 21 September 2020.

Originally set for 22 September 2020, the tie between Leyton Orient and Tottenham Hotspur was postponed after multiple Orient players tested positive for COVID-19. On 25 September, it was confirmed that Tottenham had received a bye into the fourth round, due to Orient's inability to fulfil the fixture.

22 September 2020	Newport County (4)	3–1	Watford (2)	Newport
19:00 BST	Abrahams 18' (pen.); Labadie 28'; Amond 65'	Report	Peñaranda 54' (pen.)	Stadium: Rodney Parade; Attendance: 0 Referee: Charles Breakspear

22 September 2020	West Bromwich Albion (1)	2–2 (4–5 p)	Brentford (2)	West Bromwich
19:00 BST	Robson-Kanu 56' (pen.), 66' (pen.)	Report	Marcondes 58'; Forss 73' (pen.)	Stadium: The Hawthorns; Attendance: 0 Referee: Darren England
	Penalties
	Austin (penalty scored); Gallagher (penalty scored); Edwards (penalty scored); Townsend (penalty scored); Diangana (penalty missed)		(penalty scored) Toney; (penalty scored) Dasilva; (penalty scored) Fosu; (penalty scored) Forss; (penalty scored) Nørgaard

22 September 2020	West Ham United (1)	5–1	Hull City (3)	Stratford, London
19:30 BST	Snodgrass 18'; Haller 45', 90+1'; Yarmolenko 56' (pen.), 90+2'	Report	Wilks 70'	Stadium: London Stadium; Attendance: 0 Referee: Simon Hooper

22 September 2020	Luton Town (2)	0–3	Manchester United (1)	Luton
20:15 BST		Report	Mata 44' (pen.); Rashford 88'; Greenwood 90+2'	Stadium: Kenilworth Road; Attendance: 0 Referee: Tim Robinson

23 September 2020	Millwall (2)	0–2	Burnley (1)	Bermondsey, London
19:00 BST		Report	Brownhill 45'; Vydra 90+3'	Stadium: The Den; Attendance: 0 Referee: Andy Davies

23 September 2020	Preston North End (2)	0–2	Brighton & Hove Albion (1)	Preston
19:00 BST		Report	Jahanbakhsh 57'; Mac Allister 75'	Stadium: Deepdale; Attendance: 0 Referee: Steve Martin

23 September 2020	Stoke City (2)	1–0	Gillingham (3)	Stoke-on-Trent
19:00 BST	Campbell 37'	Report		Stadium: bet365 Stadium; Attendance: 0 Referee: David Webb

23 September 2020	Fulham (1)	2–0	Sheffield Wednesday (2)	Fulham, London
19:00 BST	Kamara 9'; De Cordova-Reid 32'	Report		Stadium: Craven Cottage; Attendance: 0 Referee: Lee Mason

23 September 2020	Chelsea (1)	6–0	Barnsley (2)	Fulham, London
19:45 BST	Abraham 19'; Havertz 28', 55', 65'; Barkley 49'; Giroud 83'	Report		Stadium: Stamford Bridge; Attendance: 0 Referee: Darren Bond

23 September 2020	Fleetwood Town (3)	2–5	Everton (1)	Fleetwood
19:45 BST	Duffy 48'; Camps 58'	Report	Richarlison 22', 34'; Iwobi 49'; Bernard 73'; Kean 90+4'	Stadium: Highbury Stadium; Attendance: 0 Referee: Jeremy Simpson

23 September 2020	Leicester City (1)	0–2	Arsenal (1)	Leicester
19:45 BST		Report	Fuchs 57' (o.g.); Nketiah 90'	Stadium: King Power Stadium; Attendance: 0 Referee: Peter Bankes

23 September 2020	Morecambe (4)	0–7	Newcastle United (1)	Morecambe
19:45 BST		Report	Joelinton 5', 31'; Almirón 20'; Murphy 27'; Hayden 45+2'; Lascelles 51'; Lavelle 90+2' (o.g.)	Stadium: Globe Arena; Attendance: 0 Referee: Darren Drysdale

24 September 2020	Bristol City (2)	0–3	Aston Villa (1)	Bristol
19:00 BST		Report	El Ghazi 11'; Traoré 14'; Watkins 73'	Stadium: Ashton Gate Stadium; Attendance: 0 Referee: James Linington

24 September 2020	Lincoln City (3)	2–7	Liverpool (1)	Lincoln
19:45 BST	Edun 60'; Montsma 66'	Report	Shaqiri 9'; Minamino 18', 46'; Jones 32', 36'; Grujić 65'; Origi 89'	Stadium: Sincil Bank; Attendance: 0 Referee: Tony Harrington

24 September 2020	Manchester City (1)	2–1	Bournemouth (2)	Manchester
19:45 BST	Delap 18'; Foden 75'	Report	Surridge 22'	Stadium: City of Manchester Stadium; Attendance: 0 Referee: Jon Moss

Leyton Orient (4)	w/o (0–3)	Tottenham Hotspur (1)	Leyton, London
			Stadium: Brisbane Road

== Fourth round ==
A total of 16 teams played in this round. The draw was conducted on 17 September 2020 by Laura Woods and Lee Hendrie live on Sky Sports. The ties were played on the week commencing 28 September 2020. League Two side Newport County was the only club from the bottom two divisions of the EFL to participate in this round.

29 September 2020	Tottenham Hotspur (1)	1–1 (5–4 p)	Chelsea (1)	Tottenham, London
19:45 BST	Lamela 83'	Report	Werner 19'	Stadium: Tottenham Hotspur Stadium; Attendance: 0 Referee: Lee Mason
	Penalties
	Dier (penalty scored); Lamela (penalty scored); Højbjerg (penalty scored); Lucas (penalty scored); Kane (penalty scored)		(penalty scored) Abraham; (penalty scored) Azpilicueta; (penalty scored) Jorginho; (penalty scored) Emerson; (penalty missed) Mount

30 September 2020	Newport County (4)	1–1 (4–5 p)	Newcastle United (1)	Newport
17:30 BST	Abrahams 5'	Report	Shelvey 87'	Stadium: Rodney Parade; Attendance: 0 Referee: John Brooks
	Penalties
	Demetriou (penalty scored); Abrahams (penalty scored); Sheehan (penalty scored); Taylor (penalty missed); Dolan (penalty scored); Cooper (penalty missed)		(penalty scored) Wilson; (penalty missed) Joelinton; (penalty scored) Schär; (penalty scored) Shelvey; (penalty scored) Murphy; (penalty scored) Longstaff

30 September 2020	Burnley (1)	0–3	Manchester City (1)	Burnley
19:00 BST		Report	Sterling 35', 49'; Torres 65'	Stadium: Turf Moor; Attendance: 0 Referee: Andrew Madley

30 September 2020	Brighton & Hove Albion (1)	0–3	Manchester United (1)	Brighton
19:45 BST		Report	McTominay 44'; Mata 73'; Pogba 80'	Stadium: Falmer Stadium; Attendance: 0 Referee: Graham Scott

30 September 2020	Everton (1)	4–1	West Ham United (1)	Liverpool
19:45 BST	Calvert-Lewin 11', 78', 84'; Richarlison 56'	Report	Snodgrass 46'	Stadium: Goodison Park; Attendance: 0 Referee: Darren England

1 October 2020	Brentford (2)	3–0	Fulham (1)	Brentford, London
17:30 BST	Forss 37'; Benrahma 62', 77'	Report		Stadium: Brentford Community Stadium; Attendance: 0 Referee: Jon Moss

1 October 2020	Aston Villa (1)	0–1	Stoke City (2)	Birmingham
19:00 BST		Report	Vokes 26'	Stadium: Villa Park; Attendance: 0 Referee: Robert Jones

1 October 2020	Liverpool (1)	0–0 (4–5 p)	Arsenal (1)	Liverpool
19:45 BST		Report		Stadium: Anfield; Attendance: 0 Referee: Kevin Friend
	Penalties
	Milner (penalty scored); Wijnaldum (penalty scored); Minamino (penalty scored); Origi (penalty missed); Jones (penalty scored); Wilson (penalty missed)		(penalty scored) Lacazette; (penalty scored) Cédric; (penalty missed) Elneny; (penalty scored) Maitland-Niles; (penalty scored) Pépé; (penalty scored) Willock

== Quarter-finals ==
Eight teams played in this round. The draw was conducted on 1 October 2020 following the Liverpool v Arsenal match live on Sky Sports and was made by Jamie Redknapp. The ties were played on the week commencing 21 December 2020. Championship sides Brentford and Stoke City were the only non-Premier League clubs to participate in this round.

22 December 2020	Brentford (2)	1–0	Newcastle United (1)	Brentford, London
17:30 GMT	Dasilva 66'	Report		Stadium: Brentford Community Stadium; Attendance: 0 Referee: Robert Jones

22 December 2020	Arsenal (1)	1–4	Manchester City (1)	Islington, London
20:00 GMT	Lacazette 31'	Report	Gabriel Jesus 3'; Mahrez 54'; Foden 59'; Laporte 73'	Stadium: Emirates Stadium; Attendance: 0 Referee: Stuart Attwell

23 December 2020	Stoke City (2)	1–3	Tottenham Hotspur (1)	Stoke-on-Trent
17:30 GMT	Thompson 53'	Report	Bale 22'; Davies 70'; Kane 81'	Stadium: bet365 Stadium; Attendance: 0 Referee: Darren England

23 December 2020	Everton (1)	0–2	Manchester United (1)	Liverpool
20:00 GMT		Report	Cavani 88'; Martial 90+6'	Stadium: Goodison Park; Attendance: 2,000; Referee: Andrew Madley

== Semi-finals ==
Four teams played in this round. The draw was conducted on 23 December 2020 following the Everton v Manchester United match live on Sky Sports and was made by Darren Bent. This round was played on a single-leg basis like the rest of the tournament (in previous years the semi-finals were two-legged home and away fixtures). Championship side Brentford were the only non-Premier League club to participate in this round.

5 January 2021
19:45 GMT

Tottenham Hotspur (1)	2–0	Brentford (2)
Sissoko 12'; Son Heung-min 70'	Report

Tottenham Hotspur Stadium, London
Attendance: 0
Referee: Mike Dean
6 January 2021
19:45 GMT

Manchester United (1)	0–2	Manchester City (1)
	Report	Stones 50'; Fernandinho 83'

Old Trafford, Trafford, Greater Manchester
Attendance: 0
Referee: Martin Atkinson

== Final ==
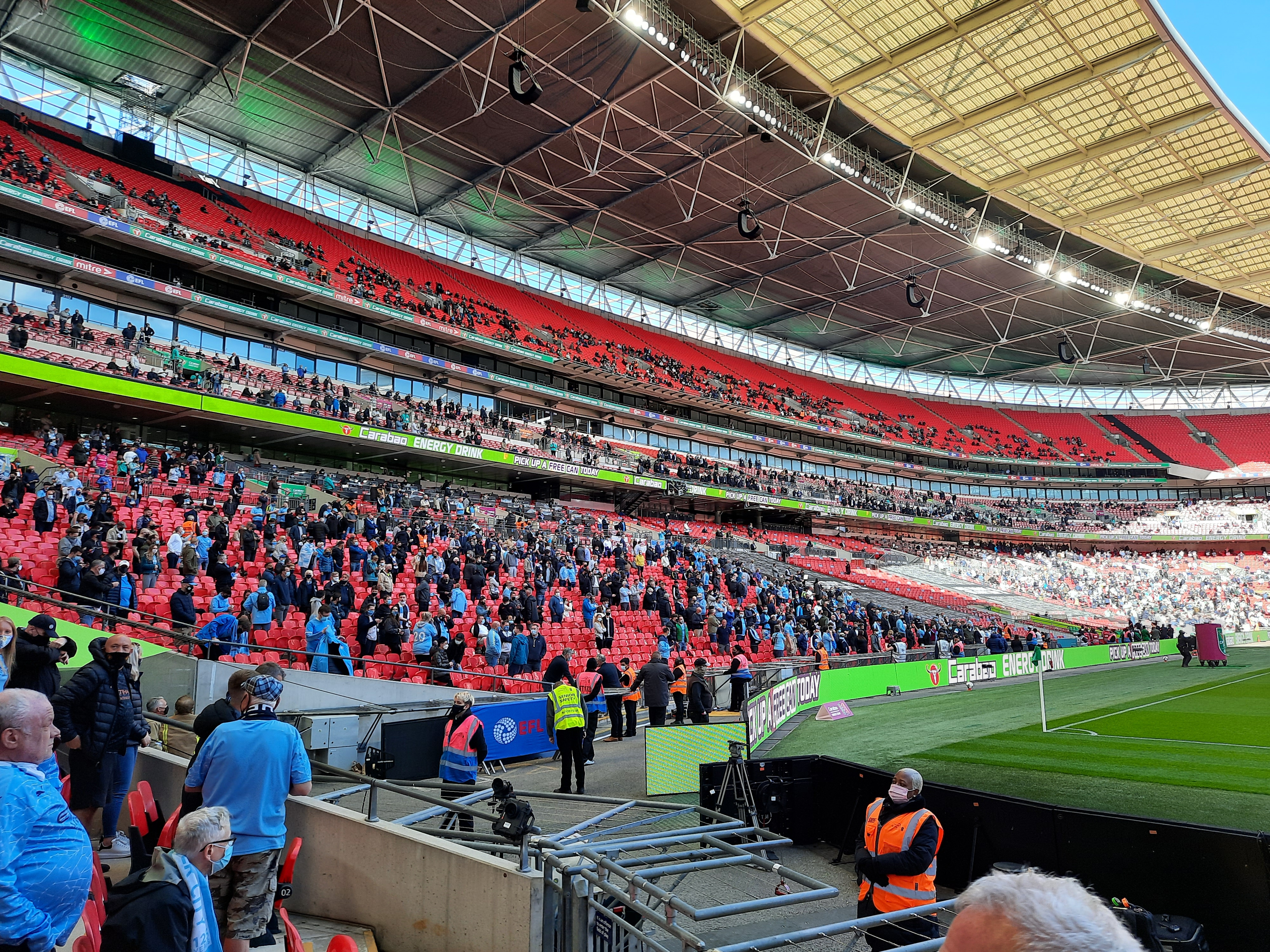
A reduced, socially distanced crowd capped at 8,000 was in attendance for the final.

The final was played on 25 April 2021 at Wembley Stadium, having been rescheduled from 28 February 2021.

25 April 2021
16:30 BST

Manchester City	1–0	Tottenham Hotspur
Laporte 82'	Report

Wembley Stadium, London
Attendance: 7,773 (Note: The total number of fans allowed to attend the final was established at 8,000 due to the COVID-19 pandemic in the United Kingdom.)
Referee: Paul Tierney (Lancashire)

== Top goalscorers ==
Rank	Player	Club	Goals
1	(England) Tristan Abrahams	Newport County	4
1	(Ivory Coast) Sébastien Haller	West Ham United	4
3	(England) Dominic Calvert-Lewin	Everton	3
3	(Republic of Ireland) James Collins	Luton Town	3
3	(Germany) Kai Havertz	Chelsea	3
3	(Angola) Lucas João	Reading	3
3	(Netherlands) Lewis Montsma	Lincoln City	3
3	(Brazil) Richarlison	Everton	3
3	(Wales) Hal Robson-Kanu	West Bromwich Albion	3
