= 2020–21 Lincoln City F.C. season =

Lincoln City
2020–21 season
- Chairman: Clive Nates
- Manager: Michael Appleton
- Stadium: Sincil Bank
- League One: 5th
- Play-offs: Runners-up (vs. Blackpool)
- FA Cup: Second round (vs. Plymouth Argyle)
- EFL Cup: Third round (vs. Liverpool)
- EFL Trophy: Semi-final (vs. Sunderland)
- Top goalscorer: League: Jorge Grant (13 goals); All: Jorge Grant; Anthony Scully (17 goals)
- Highest home attendance: 3,000 (vs. Sunderland, 19 May 2021)
- Biggest win: 5–0 (vs. Bradford City, 15 September 2020, EFL Cup)
- Biggest defeat: 2–7 (vs. Liverpool, 24 September 2020, EFL Cup)
Home colours	Away colours	Third colours

The 2020–21 Lincoln City F.C. season is the club's 137th season in their history and the second consecutive season in EFL League One, Along with League One, the club will also participate in the FA Cup, EFL Cup and EFL Trophy.

The season covers the period from 1 July 2020 to 30 June 2021.

== Pre-season ==
18 August 2020 Friendly	Salford City	1–0	Lincoln City	Salford
15:00 BST	Henderson 10'	Report		Stadium: Peninsula Stadium

22 August 2020 Friendly	Lincoln City	2–3	Leicester City XI	Scampton
BST	Edun; Hopper			Stadium: Soper of Lincoln Elite Performance Centre

25 August 2020 Friendly	Lincoln City	4–0	Scunthorpe United	Lincoln
19:45 BST	Walsh 1'; Elbouzedi 50'; Eyoma 62'; Hopper 87'	Report		Stadium: LNER Stadium

29 August 2020 Friendly	Oldham Athletic	2–1	Lincoln City	Oldham
13:00 BST	McAleny 38'; Keillor-Dunn 83'	Report	Scully 48'	Stadium: Boundary Park

1 September 2020 Friendly	Lincoln City	2–0	Nottingham Forest U23
BST	Roughan; Trialist	Report

== Competitions ==
=== EFL League One ===
==== League table ====
Pos	Team	Pld	W	D	L	GF	GA	GD	Pts	Promotion, qualification or relegation
1	Hull City (C, P)	46	27	8	11	80	38	+42	89	Promotion to the EFL Championship
2	Peterborough United (P)	46	26	9	11	83	46	+37	87	Promotion to the EFL Championship
3	Blackpool (O, P)	46	23	11	12	60	37	+23	80	Qualification for League One play-offs
4	Sunderland	46	20	17	9	70	42	+28	77	Qualification for League One play-offs
5	Lincoln City	46	22	11	13	69	50	+19	77	Qualification for League One play-offs
6	Oxford United	46	22	8	16	77	56	+21	74	Qualification for League One play-offs
7	Charlton Athletic	46	20	14	12	70	56	+14	74	
8	Portsmouth	46	21	9	16	65	51	+14	72	
9	Ipswich Town	46	19	12	15	46	46	0	69	

Source: EFL Official Website
Rules for classification: 1) Points; 2) Goal difference; 3) Number of goals scored; 4) Head-to-head results; 5) Wins; 6) Away goals; 7) Penalty points (sec 9.5); 8) 12-point sending off offences
(C) Champions; (O) Play-off winners; (P) Promoted

==== Results summary ====
Overall								Home						Away					
Pld	W	D	L	GF	GA	GD	Pts	W	D	L	GF	GA	GD	W	D	L	GF	GA	GD
46	22	11	13	69	50	+19	77	9	5	9	35	30	+5	13	6	4	34	20	+14

Last updated: 9 May 2021.
Source: BBC

==== Results by matchday ====
Matchday	1	2	3	4	5	6	7	8	9	10	11	12	13	14	15	16	17	18	19	20	21	22	23	24	25	26	27	28	29	30	31	32	33	34	35	36	37	38	39	40	41	42	43	44	45	46
Ground	H	A	H	A	H	A	H	H	A	A	H	A	A	H	A	H	H	A	H	A	H	H	A	H	A	A	H	A	H	A	H	H	A	H	H	A	A	H	H	A	A	H	A	A	A	H
Result	W	W	W	W	L	D	W	W	W	L	L	D	W	W	W	L	L	W	W	W	D	W	W	L	W	D	D	W	D	L	L	W	D	L	L	D	L	D	W	W	W	L	W	D	L	D
Position	6	2	2	1	2	3	3	1	1	3	4	6	3	2	2	2	4	2	1	1	1	2	1	2	1	1	1	1	2	2	3	3	3	3	4	4	4	6	4	4	4	4	3	4	5	5

Updated to match(es) played on 9 May 2021. Source: 11v11 for league tables and fixtures
A = Away; H = Home; W = Win; D = Draw; L = Loss

==== Matches ====
On 21 August 2020 the EFL League One fixtures were revealed.

12 September 2020 1	Lincoln City	2–0	Oxford United	Lincoln
15:00 BST	Scully 7'; Jackson 74'	Report	Clare (yellow card) 57'; Atkinson (red card) 90+5'	Stadium: LNER Stadium; Attendance: 0 Referee: Andy Davies

19 September 2020 2	Milton Keynes Dons	1–2	Lincoln City	Milton Keynes
15:00 BST	Harvie (yellow card) 25'; Houghton (yellow card) 45+3'; Mason 59'; Cargill (yellow card) 64'; Brittain (yellow card) 69'; Kasumu (yellow card) 73'	Report	Grant 11' (pen.); Jones (yellow card) 54'; Morton (yellow card) 69'; Hopper 78'; Eyoma (yellow card) 90+3'	Stadium: Stadium MK; Attendance: 0 Referee: Brett Huxtable

27 September 2020 3	Lincoln City	2–0	Charlton Athletic	Lincoln
15:00 BST	McGrandles (yellow card) 37'; Grant 45+1'; Eyoma (yellow card) 83'; Montsma 88'; Johnson (yellow card) 90+1'	Report	Pratley (yellow card) 75'; Watson (yellow card) 81'; Barker (yellow card) 87'; Forster-Caskey (yellow card) 90+1'	Stadium: LNER Stadium; Attendance: 0 Referee: Marc Edwards

3 October 2020 4	Blackpool	2–3	Lincoln City	Blackpool
15:00 BST	Hamilton 17'; Lubala (yellow card) 60'; Mitchell 82'; Husband (red card) 84'	Report	Grant 24' (pen.), 85' (pen.); Montsma 88'	Stadium: Bloomfield Road; Attendance: 0 Referee: Thomas Bramall

10 October 2020 5	Lincoln City	1–2	Bristol Rovers	Lincoln
15:00 BST	Montsma 46'; Jackson (yellow card) 61' (yellow-red card) 83'; Bridcutt (yellow card) 87'	Report	Daly 48'; Hanlan 58' (pen.); Nicholson (yellow card) 90+5'; Tutonda (yellow card) 90+8'	Stadium: LNER Stadium; Attendance: 0 Referee: Jeremy Simpson

17 October 2020 6	Fleetwood Town	0–0	Lincoln City	Fleetwood
15:00 BST		Report	Montsma (yellow card) 90+1'	Stadium: Highbury Stadium; Attendance: 0 Referee: Anthony Backhouse

20 October 2020 7	Lincoln City	2–0	Plymouth Argyle	Lincoln
19:00 BST	Jones (yellow card) 11'; Walsh (yellow card) 21'; Grant 50' (pen.); Johnson 72'	Report	Nouble (yellow card) 19'	Stadium: LNER Stadium; Attendance: 0 Referee: Christopher Pollard

24 October 2020 8	Lincoln City	1–0	Ipswich Town	Lincoln
15:00 BST	Grant 77' (pen.); McGrandles (yellow card) 90+2'; Edun (yellow card) 90+6'	Report	Nolan (red card) 90+5'; Bishop (yellow card) 90+6'	Stadium: LNER Stadium; Attendance: 0 Referee: Kevin Johnson

27 October 2020 9	Crewe Alexandra	0–1	Lincoln City	Crewe
19:00 BST	Murphy (yellow card) 39'	Report	Anderson 39'	Stadium: Alexandra Stadium; Attendance: 0 Referee: Ben Speedie

31 October 2020 10	Doncaster Rovers	1–0	Lincoln City	Doncaster
15:00 GMT	Whiteman 43'; Wright (yellow card) 71'	Report	Eyoma (yellow card) 74'	Stadium: Keepmoat Stadium; Attendance: 0 Referee: Robert Madley

3 November 2020 11	Lincoln City	1–3	Portsmouth	Lincoln
19:00 BST	Hopper 73'; Grant (yellow card) 90+4'	Report	Marquis 5', 50' (yellow card) 88'; Curtis (yellow card) 57' (goal) 61'	Stadium: LNER Stadium; Attendance: 0 Referee: Carl Brook

21 November 2020 12	Accrington Stanley	0–0	Lincoln City	Accrington
15:00 GMT	McConville (red card) 71'	Report	Johnson (yellow card) 57'; Eyoma (yellow card) 68'	Stadium: Wham Stadium; Attendance: 0 Referee: James Adcock

24 November 2020 13	Swindon Town	0–1	Lincoln City	Swindon
19:00 GMT	Smith (yellow card) 28'; Broadbent (yellow card) 43'; Baudry (yellow card) 50'; Donohue (yellow card) 52'; Odimayo (yellow card) 59'	Report	Montsma 74'; Jones (yellow card) 90'	Stadium: The Energy Check County Ground; Attendance: 0

1 December 2020 14	Lincoln City	2–1	Wigan Athletic	Lincoln
19:00 BST	Grant 69' (yellow card) 75'; Hopper 83'	Report	Naismith 52'; Jones (yellow card) 59'	Stadium: LNER Stadium; Attendance: 0 Referee: Sam Purkiss

5 December 2020 15	Rochdale	0–2	Lincoln City	Rochdale
15:00 GMT	Lund (yellow card) 54'; O'Connell (yellow card) 90+2'	Report	Edun (yellow card) 14'; Jones 38'; Montsma 68'	Stadium: Crown Oil Arena; Attendance: 0 Referee: Sam Allison

12 December 2020 16	Lincoln City	0-4	Sunderland	Lincoln
15:00 GMT	Montsma (yellow card) 19'	Report	Leadbitter 16' (pen.) (yellow card) 90'; Wyke 25', 72'; Diamond (yellow card) 27' (goal) 42'; McLaughlin (yellow card) 51'	Stadium: LNER Stadium; Attendance: 0 Referee: Charles Breakspeare

15 December 2020 17	Lincoln City	0–1	Shrewsbury Town	Lincoln
19:00 GMT	Jones (yellow card) 45+2'	Report	Whalley (yellow card) 28' (goal) 38'; Norburn (yellow card) 31'	Stadium: LNER Stadium; Attendance: 0 Referee: Craig Hicks

19 December 2020 18	Northampton Town	0–4	Lincoln City	Northampton
15:00 GMT	Bolger (yellow card) 56'	Report	Scully 2' (yellow card) 77'; Monstma (yellow card) 36'; Hopper 42' (yellow card) 73'; Johnson 83', 90+8'	Stadium: PTS Academy Stadium; Attendance: 2,000; Referee: Robert Lewis

26 December 2020 19	Lincoln City	5–1	Burton Albion	Lincoln
15:00 GMT	Howarth 4'; Johnson 7', 63' (yellow card) 80'; Scully 56'; Walsh (yellow card) 60'; Anderson 81'	Report	Hemmings 74'	Stadium: LNER Stadium; Attendance: 0 Referee: James Bell

2 January 2021 20	AFC Wimbledon	1–2	Lincoln City	Wimbledon
15:00 GMT	Palmer 31'; Woodyard (yellow card) 38'	Report	Edun 8'; Johnson (yellow card) 28'; Grant (yellow card) 68'; Hopper 83'	Stadium: Plough Lane; Attendance: 0 Referee: Lee Swabey

9 January 2021 21	Lincoln City	1–1	Peterborough United	Lincoln
12:30 GMT	Jackson (yellow card) 16'; Bridcutt (yellow card) 21'; Scully 49'; Grant (penalty missed) 68'; Eyoma (yellow card) 80'; Jones (yellow card) 90+1'	Report	Eyoma 10' (o.g.); Thompson (yellow card) 23' (yellow-red card) 67'; Brown (yellow card) 63'; Kent (yellow card) 89'	Stadium: LNER Stadium; Attendance: 0 Referee: Will Finnie

23 January 2021 22	Lincoln City	2–1	Northampton Town	Lincoln
15:00 GMT	McGrandles 75'; Bridcutt (yellow card) 77'; Scully 84'	Report	Jones (yellow card) 36'; Rose 90+5'	Stadium: LNER Stadium; Attendance: 0 Referee: Anthony Backhouse

26 January 2021 23	Portsmouth	0–1	Lincoln City	Portsmouth
19:00 GMT	Harness (yellow card) 16'; Raggett (yellow card) 22'; Whatmough (red card) 29'	Report	Edun (yellow card) 32'; Rogers 79'; Jackson (yellow card) 88'; McGrandles (yellow card) 90+1'	Stadium: Fratton Park; Attendance: 0 Referee: Sam Purkiss

30 January 2021 24	Lincoln City	0–1	Doncaster Rovers	Lincoln
15:00 GMT	Grant (penalty missed); Edun (yellow card) 72'; Scully (penalty missed)	Report	Richards 15'; Anderson (yellow card) 60'; Halliday (yellow card) 85'; Balcombe (yellow card) 87'	Stadium: Sincil Bank; Referee: Darren Bond

5 February 2021 25	Gillingham	0–3	Lincoln City	Gillingham
18:00 GMT	Slattery (yellow card) 40'; Oliver (yellow card) 41'; Akinde (yellow card) 78'; Ogilvie (yellow card) 90+9' Steve Evans (yellow card)	Report	McGrandles 14', 64'; Grant (yellow card) 43', (goal) 59' (pen.); Bridcutt (yellow card) 76'	Stadium: Priestfield Stadium; Attendance: 0 Referee: Sam Barrott

9 February 2021 26	Hull City	0–0	Lincoln City	Kingston upon Hull
19:00 GMT	Coyle (yellow card) 43'; Docherty (yellow card) 90+3'	Report	McGrandles (yellow card) 23'; Rogers (yellow card) 50'; Grant (yellow card) 89'	Stadium: Hull City Stadium; Attendance: 0 Referee: Seb Stockbridge

14 February 2021 27	Lincoln City	2–2	Accrington Stanley	Lincoln
18:00 GMT	Rogers 53'; McGrandles (yellow card) 80'; Grant (yellow card) 83'; Hopper 84'	Report	Charles 6', 90'; Barclay (yellow card) 14'	Stadium: LNER Stadium; Attendance: 0 Referee: Martin Coy

20 February 2021 28	Wigan Athletic	1–2	Lincoln City	Wigan
15:00 GMT	Lang 33'; Aasgaard (yellow card) 49'; Proctor (yellow card) 54'; Wootton (yellow card) 70'; Massey (yellow card) 90+1'	Report	Scully 34'; Jackson (yellow card) 70'; Hopper 73'; Palmer (yellow card) 89'; Johnson (yellow card) 90+5'	Stadium: DW Stadium; Attendance: 0 Referee: Trevor Kettle

23 February 2021 29	Lincoln City	2–2	Swindon Town	Lincoln
19:00 GMT	McGrandles (yellow card) 12'; Grant 26' (pen.); Rogers 59'; Montsma (yellow card) 74'	Report	Garrick 2'; Palmer (yellow card) 19'; Pitman 44'; Odimayo (yellow card) 57'	Stadium: LNER Stadium; Attendance: 0 Referee: Declan Bourne

27 February 2021 30	Plymouth Argyle	4–3	Lincoln City	Plymouth
15:00 GMT	Watts 3'; Mayor 13'; Fornah (yellow card) 27'; Edwards (yellow card) 63', (goal) 90+1'; Grant 77'	Report	McGrandles 22'; Grant 59' (pen.), 62' (pen.)	Stadium: Home Park; Attendance: 0 Referee: Kevin Johnson

2 March 2021 31	Lincoln City	1–2	Fleetwood Town	Lincoln
19:00 GMT	Morton 71'	Report	Andrew (yellow card) 32'; Garner 43'; Camps 53'	Stadium: LNER Stadium; Attendance: 0 Referee: David Rock

6 March 2021 32	Lincoln City	3–0	Crewe Alexandra	Lincoln
15:00 GMT	Rogers 21'; McGrandles 52'; Jackson (yellow card) 67'; Jones (yellow card) 79'; Johnson 80'	Report		Stadium: LNER Stadium; Attendance: 0 Referee: John Busby

9 March 2021 33	Ipswich Town	1–1	Lincoln City	Ipswich
19:45 BST	Bishop (yellow card) 50'; Wilson 72'; Downes (yellow card) 84'	Report	Rogers 29'; Edun (yellow card) 43'; Montsma (yellow card) 63'	Stadium: Portman Road; Attendance: 0 Referee: James Oldham

13 March 2021 34	Lincoln City	1–2	Rochdale	Lincoln
15:00 GMT	Rogers 60'	Report	Rathbone 36'; Humphrys 74'	Stadium: LNER Stadium; Attendance: 0 Referee: Antony Coggins

16 March 2021 35	Lincoln City	0–3	Gillingham	Lincoln
19:00 GMT	Johnson (yellow card) 69'; Edun (yellow card) 72'	Report	Oliver 10'; Dempsey 20'; O'Keefe (yellow card) 49'; Tucker (yellow card) 63'; Akinde (yellow card) 76'; Graham 87' (pen.)	Stadium: LNER Stadium; Attendance: 0 Referee: Ross Joyce

20 March 2021 36	Sunderland	1–1	Lincoln City	Sunderland
15:00 GMT	Wyke (yellow card) 34'; McFadzean 40'; Power (yellow card) 42'; McLaughlin (yellow card) 87'	Report	Morton 63'; Bridcutt (yellow card) 77'	Stadium: Stadium of Light; Attendance: 0 Referee: Carl Boyeson

26 March 2021 37	Oxford United	2–1	Lincoln City	Oxford
19:45 GMT	Forde 29'; Stevens (yellow card) 43'; Hanson (yellow card) 45+4'; Taylor 57'	Report	Scully 4'; Edun (yellow card) 56'	Stadium: The Kassam Stadium; Attendance: 0 Referee: Scott Oldham

10 April 2021 38	Lincoln City	2–2	Blackpool	Lincoln
15:00 GMT	Morton (yellow card) 2'; McGrandles (yellow card) 49'; Scully 75'; Johnson 84' (yellow card) 90+4'; Jones (yellow card) 90+1'	Report	Simms 37'; Kaikai 48'	Stadium: LNER Stadium; Attendance: 0 Referee: Marc Edwards

13 April 2021 39	Lincoln City	4–0	Milton Keynes Dons	Lincoln
19:00 BST	Poole (yellow card) 14'; Johnson (yellow card) 20', (goal) 48', 53', 59' (pen.); Fisher 73' (o.g.)	Report	Laird (yellow card) 39'; Kasumu (yellow card) 66'; Darling (yellow card) 72'; Harvie (yellow card) 87'; Lewington (yellow card) 90+5'	Stadium: LNER Stadium; Attendance: 0 Referee: Bobby Madley

17 April 2021 40	Bristol Rovers	0–1	Lincoln City	Horfield
12:30 BST	Upson (red card) 36'; Jaakkola (yellow card) 51'; Leahy (yellow card) 52'; Baldwin (yellow card) 90+8'; McCormick (yellow card) 90+9'	Report	Scully 16'; Edun (yellow card) 37'; Johnson (yellow card) 37'; Poole (yellow card) 90'	Stadium: Memorial Stadium; Attendance: 0 Referee: Will Finnie

20 April 2021 41	Burton Albion	0–1	Lincoln City	Burton upon Trent
19:00 BST	Fondop (yellow card) 88'; Taylor (yellow card) 90+3'	Report	Eyoma 27'	Stadium: Pirelli Stadium; Attendance: 0 Referee: Josh Smith

24 April 2021 42	Lincoln City	1–2	Hull City	Lincoln
15:00 BST	Grant (yellow card) 30'; McGrandles (yellow card) 35'; Montsma 65'	Report	Magennis 4'; Honeyman (yellow card) 17'; Wilks (yellow card) 57' (goal) 83' (pen.); Eaves (yellow card) 88'	Stadium: LNER Stadium; Attendance: 0 Referee: Sam Purkiss

27 April 2021 43	Shrewsbury Town	0–1	Lincoln City	Shrewsbury
19:00 BST	Norburn (yellow card) 3'; Whalley (yellow card) 23'; Davis (yellow card) 45+3'; Vela (yellow card) 82'; Ebanks-Landell (yellow card) 89'	Report	Grant 11'; Rogers (yellow card) 65'	Stadium: Montgomery Waters Meadow; Attendance: 0 Referee: Ollie Yates

1 May 2021 44	Peterborough United	3–3	Lincoln City	Peterborough
15:00 BST	Taylor (yellow card) 55'; Dembélé 65'; Clarke-Harris 75', 90+6' (pen.), (yellow card) 90+6'	Report	Scully 31', 53'; Grant 45+2' (pen.), (yellow card) 90+8'; Bridcutt (yellow card) 56'; Montsma (yellow card) 90+5'; McGrandles (yellow card) 90+8'	Stadium: Weston Homes Stadium; Attendance: 0 Referee: John Busby

4 May 2021 45	Charlton Athletic	3–1	Lincoln City	Charlton
19:00 BST	Purrington (yellow card) 17'; Stockley 47'; Inniss 65'; Aneke 66', (yellow card) 83'; Pratley (yellow card) 90+2'	Report	Bramall (yellow card) 20'; Jones (yellow card) 42'; Anderson 88'	Stadium: The Valley; Attendance: 0 Referee: Kevin Johnson

9 May 2021 46	Lincoln City	0–0	AFC Wimbledon	Lincoln
12:00 BST	McGrandles (yellow card) 32'	Report	Dobson (yellow card) 36'	Stadium: LNER Stadium; Attendance: 0 Referee: Scott Oldham

==== Play-offs ====
19 May 2021 Semi-final, first leg	Lincoln City	2–0	Sunderland	Lincoln
18:00 BST	Hopper 51'; Bridcutt (yellow card) 72'; Johnson 77'; Grant (yellow card) 86'	Report	O'Nien (yellow card) 61'	Stadium: LNER Stadium; Attendance: 3,000; Referee: Craig Hicks

22 May 2021 Semi-final, second leg	Sunderland	2–1 (2–3 agg.)	Lincoln City	Sunderland
15:30 BST	Stewart 13'; Wyke 33'; Scowen (yellow card) 36'; Leadbitter (yellow card) 67'	Report	Johnson (yellow card) 52'; Hopper 56'; Grant (penalty missed) 63'; Edun (yellow card) 83'	Stadium: Stadium of Light; Referee: Michael Salisbury

30 May 2021 Final	Blackpool	2–1	Lincoln City	Wembley
15:00 BST	Dougall 34', 54', (yellow card) 92'; Garbutt (yellow card) 8'; Ballard (yellow card) 48'; Husband (yellow card) 84'	Report	Turton 1' (o.g.); Bridcutt (yellow card) 66'	Stadium: Wembley Stadium; Attendance: 9,751; Referee: Tony Harrington

=== FA Cup ===
The first round draw was made on 26 October 2020. The second round draw was made on the 9 November 2020, by former Lincoln City manager Danny Cowley.

7 November 2020 First round	Lincoln City	6–2	Forest Green Rovers	Lincoln
15:00 BST	Edun (yellow card) 10'; Grant 17', 24' (pen.) (yellow card) 68'; Johnson 64'; Archibald (yellow card) 74'; Scully 78', 88'; Jones 90+2'	Report	Kitching (yellow card) 23'; Whitehouse 82'; Young 90+4'	Stadium: LNER Stadium; Attendance: 0 Referee: Sam Barrott

28 November 2020 Second round	Plymouth Argyle	2–0	Lincoln City	Plymouth
15:00 GMT	Jephcott 6'; Canavan (yellow card) 55'; Reeves 55'; Opoku (yellow card) 85'	Report	Melbourne (yellow card) 21'; Walsh (yellow card) 54'; Johnson (yellow card) 55'; Edun (yellow card) 67'	Stadium: Home Park; Attendance: 0 Referee: David Rock

=== EFL Cup ===
The first round draw was made on 18 August. The draw for both the second and third round were confirmed on September 6, live on Sky Sports by Phil Babb.

5 September 2020 First round	Crewe Alexandra	1–2	Lincoln City	Crewe
15:00 BST	Dale (yellow card) 47'; Sass-Davies 55'	Report	Hopper 52'; Montsma 66' (yellow card) 90+2'	Stadium: Alexandra Stadium; Attendance: 0 Referee: Scott Oldham

15 September 2020 Second round	Bradford City	0–5	Lincoln City	Bradford
19:00 BST	Watt (yellow card) 31'; O'Connor (yellow card) 45+2'	Report	French 4' (o.g.); Scully 6'; Montsma 29'; Jones 41'; Morton 90+3'	Stadium: Utilita Energy Stadium; Attendance: 0 Referee: Michael Salisbury

24 September 2020 Third round	Lincoln City	2–7	Liverpool	Lincoln
19:45 BST	Edun 60'; Montsma 66'; Eyoma (yellow card) 69'	Report	Shaqiri 9'; Minamino 18', 46'; Jones 32', 36'; Grujić 65'; Origi 89'	Stadium: LNER Stadium; Attendance: 0 Referee: Tony Harrington
Note: Live on Sky Sports

=== EFL Trophy ===
The regional group stage draw was confirmed on 18 August. The second round draw was made by Matt Murray on 20 November, at St Andrew's. The third round was made on 10 December 2020 by Jon Parkin. The Quarter Final draw was made on 23 January 2021 by Sam Parkin. The Semi Final draw was made on 5 February 2021 by Adebayo Akinfenwa.

Pos	Div	Team	Pld	W	PW	PL	L	GF	GA	GD	Pts	Qualification
1	ACA	Manchester City U21	3	2	0	1	0	8	1	+7	7	Advance to Round 2
2	L1	Lincoln City	3	1	2	0	0	5	3	+2	7	Advance to Round 2
3	L2	Mansfield Town	3	1	0	0	2	3	7	−4	3	
4	L2	Scunthorpe United	3	0	0	1	2	2	7	−5	1	

Source: EFL.com

8 September 2020 Group Game 1	Lincoln City	1–1 (4–2 p)	Scunthorpe United	Lincoln
19:00 BST	Palmer (yellow card) 19'; Melbourne (yellow card) 51'; Anderson 80'	Report	Cordner 38'	Stadium: LNER Stadium; Attendance: 0 Referee: James Oldham
	Penalties
	Howarth (penalty scored); Montsma (penalty scored); Scully (penalty scored); Jones (penalty scored)		Jarvis (penalty missed); Vincent (penalty scored); Hippolyte (penalty missed); Gilliead (penalty scored)

6 October 2020 Group Game 2	Mansfield Town	1–3	Lincoln City	Mansfield
19:00 BST	Perch (yellow card) 34'; Gordon (yellow card) 55'; Menayese 72'	Report	Soule 31'; Scully 49'; Edun (yellow card) 55'; Archibald (yellow card) 61' (goal) 62'	Stadium: One Call Stadium; Attendance: 0 Referee: Ben Toner

17 November 2020 Group Game 3	Lincoln City	1–1 (4–3 p)	Manchester City U21	Lincoln
19:00 GMT	Bridcutt (yellow card) 27'; Edun (yellow card) 59'; Hopper (yellow card) 64'; Anderson 76'; McGrandles (yellow card) 81'; Grant (yellow card) 90+4'	Report	Nmecha (yellow card) 87'; Simmonds 88'	Stadium: LNER Stadium; Attendance: 0 Referee: Carl Boyeson
	Penalties
	Archibald (penalty scored); Anderson (penalty scored); Gotts (penalty scored); Jones (penalty missed); Grant (penalty scored)		Bernabé (penalty scored); Nmecha (penalty scored); Lavia (penalty scored); Gyabi (penalty missed); Simmonds (penalty missed)

8 December 2020 Second round	Shrewsbury Town	1–4	Lincoln City	Shrewsbury
19:00 GMT	Tracey 44'	Report	Scully 18'; McGrandles (yellow card) 29'; Elbouzedi 40'; Howarth 67'; Grant 78' (pen.)	Stadium: Montgomery Waters Meadow; Attendance: 0 Referee: Ben Toner

12 January 2021 Third round	Lincoln City	4–0	Accrington Stanley	Lincoln
19:00 GMT	Elbouzedi 32'; Gotts 53'; Johnson 62'; Grant 90'	Report	Mohammed (yellow card) 64'; Barclay (yellow card) 77'	Stadium: LNER Stadium; Attendance: 0 Referee: Chris Sarginson

2 February 2021 Quarter final	Hull City	1–1 (3–4 p)	Lincoln City	Kingston upon Hull
19:45 GMT	Docherty 60'	Report	Anderson 7'; Walsh (yellow card) 86'	Stadium: Hull City Stadium; Attendance: 0 Referee: Robert Madley
	Penalties
	Smallwood (penalty missed); Scott (penalty missed); Chadwick (penalty scored); Lewis-Potter (penalty scored); Elder (penalty scored); Flores (penalty missed)		Jones (penalty scored); Montsma (penalty missed); Anderson (penalty missed); Scully (penalty scored); Grant (penalty scored); Johnson (penalty scored)

17 February 2021 Semi Final	Sunderland	1–1 (5–3 p)	Lincoln City	Sunderland
18:00 GMT	Scowen (yellow card) 54'; McLaughlin (yellow card) 67'; Wyke 75'	Report	Edun (yellow card) 24'; Scully 64'; Johnson (yellow card) 77'	Stadium: Stadium of Light; Attendance: 0 Referee: Ben Toner
	Penalties
	Power (penalty scored); O'Nien (penalty scored); Maguire (penalty scored); McGeady (penalty scored); Leadbitter (penalty scored)		Scully (penalty scored); McGrandles (penalty scored); Howarth (penalty missed); Johnson (penalty scored)

== Transfers and contracts ==
=== Transfers in ===
Date	Pos.	Nat.	Name	From	Fee	Ref.
6 July 2020	CM	SCO	James Jones	Crewe Alexandra	Free transfer	
14 July 2020	CB	NED	Lewis Montsma	FC Dordrecht	Free transfer	
24 July 2020	GK	ENG	Ethan Ross	Colchester United	Free transfer	
27 July 2020	CM	SCO	Conor McGrandles	Milton Keynes Dons	Free transfer	
7 August 2020	CM	SCO	Liam Bridcutt	Nottingham Forest	Free transfer	
11 August 2020	CB	ENG	Adam Jackson	Hibernian	Undisclosed	
13 August 2020	CB	WAL	Joe Walsh	Milton Keynes Dons	Free transfer	
24 August 2020	RW	SCO	Theo Archibald	Macclesfield Town	Free transfer	
4 September 2020	LW	ENG	Remy Howarth	Cefn Druids	Free transfer	
30 January 2021	RB	WAL	Regan Poole	Milton Keynes Dons	Undisclosed	
1 February 2021	LB	ENG	Cohen Bramall	Colchester United	Undisclosed	
1 February 2021	CM	ENG	Max Sanders	Brighton & Hove Albion	Undisclosed	

=== Transfers out ===
Date	Pos.	Nat.	Name	To	Fee	Ref.
1 July 2020	GK	ENG	Charlie Andrew	Pickering Town	Released	
1 July 2020	GK	POL	Michael Antkowiak	Lincoln United	Free transfer	
1 July 2020	CB	ENG	Michael Bostwick	Burton Albion	Released	
1 July 2020	RB	WAL	Neal Eardley	Burton Albion	Released	
1 July 2020	CM	IRL	Lee Frecklington	Frickley Athletic	Released	
1 July 2020	LB	ENG	Akeem Hinds	Brackley Town	Released	
1 July 2020	CB	ENG	Jamie McCombe	Retired		
1 July 2020	LM	ENG	Tom Pett	Stevenage	Released	
1 July 2020	CB	ENG	Jason Shackell	Unattached	Released	
1 July 2020	CB	IRL	Alan Sheehan	Northampton Town	Released	
1 July 2020	GK	ENG	Grant Smith	Wealdstone	Released	
1 July 2020	GK	ENG	Josh Vickers	Rotherham United	Released	
1 July 2020	GK	ENG	Ross Woolley	Lincoln United	Free transfer	
6 August 2020	CM	ENG	Jack Payne	Swindon Town	Free transfer	
21 August 2020	CB	IRE	Cian Bolger	Northampton Town	Undisclosed	
12 September 2020	DF	ENG	Gianluca Bucci	Gainsborough Trinity	Free transfer	
15 October 2020	CM	ENG	Ellis Chapman	Cheltenham Town	Undisclosed	
16 October 2020	FW	USA	Jordan Adebayo-Smith	Sutton United	Released	
16 October 2020	LB	ENG	Ben Coker	Stevenage	Free transfer	
11 January 2021	CM	FIN	Alex Bradley	Yeovil Town	Undisclosed	
1 February 2021	RB	WAL	Aaron Lewis	Newport County	Released	

=== Loans in ===
Date	Pos.	Nat.	Name	From	Until	Ref.
11 August 2020	RB	ENG	TJ Eyoma	Tottenham Hotspur	30 June 2021	
4 September 2020	GK	ENG	Alex Palmer	West Bromwich Albion	30 June 2021	
4 September 2020	FW	ENG	Callum Morton	West Bromwich Albion	30 June 2021	
25 September 2020	FW	WAL	Brennan Johnson	Nottingham Forest	30 June 2021	
6 October 2020	FW	ENG	Jamie Soule	West Bromwich Albion	1 January 2021	
15 October 2020	RB	ENG	Robbie Gotts	Leeds United	15 January 2021	
4 January 2021	FW	ENG	Morgan Rogers	Manchester City	30 June 2021	
18 May 2021	GK	ENG	Josef Bursik	Stoke City	21 May 2021	

=== Loans out ===
Date	Pos.	Nat.	Name	To	Until	Ref.
7 August 2020	LB	ENG	Ben Coker	Stevenage	16 October 2020	
16 October 2020	RB	WAL	Aaron Lewis	Newport County	2 January 2021	
3 November 2020	CM	FIN	Alex Bradley	Yeovil Town	10 January 2021	
5 January 2021	GK	ENG	Ethan Ross	Weymouth	30 June 2021	
16 January 2021	FW	IRE	Zack Elbouzedi	Bolton Wanderers	30 June 2021	
1 February 2021	LB	ENG	Max Melbourne	Walsall	30 June 2021	

=== New contracts ===
Date from	Position	Nationality	Name	Length	Expiry	Ref.
23 July 2020	DF	EIR	Sean Roughan	—	—	
1 October 2020	GK	ENG	Sam Long	3 years	June 2023	
7 October 2020	DF	ENG	Hayden Cann	3 years	June 2023	
29 January 2021	MF	ENG	Jorge Grant	2 1/2 years	June 2023	
25 February 2021		ENG	Michael Appleton	4 years	June 2025	
25 February 2021	FW	ENG	Remy Howarth	1 1/2 years	June 2022	
25 February 2021	FW	EIR	Anthony Scully	2 1/2 years	June 2023	
28 March 2021	CB	ENG	Joe Walsh	—	—	
17 May 2021	FW	ENG	Jovon Makama	—	—	

== Squad statistics ==
=== Appearances ===
As of 30 May 2021

No.	Pos	Nat	Player	Total		League 1		FA Cup		League Cup		EFL Trophy		League 1 Play-offs	
No.	Pos	Nat	Player	Apps	Goals	Apps	Goals	Apps	Goals	Apps	Goals	Apps	Goals	Apps	Goals
1	GK	(England) ENG	Alex Palmer	58	0	46	0	2	0	3	0	5	0	2	0
2	DF	(Wales) WAL	Regan Poole	25	0	18+4	0	0	0	0	0	0	0	3	0
3	DF	(England) ENG	Max Melbourne	16	0	1+7	0	2	0	2	0	4	0	0	0
4	DF	(Netherlands) NED	Lewis Montsma	49	9	38+2	6	0	0	3	3	3	0	1+2	0
5	DF	(England) ENG	Adam Jackson	34	1	27+1	1	1	0	1	0	3	0	1	0
6	MF	(England) ENG	Max Sanders	6	0	1+4	0	0	0	0	0	1	0	0	0
7	MF	(England) ENG	Tayo Edun	54	2	36+5	1	2	0	2	1	6	0	3	0
8	MF	(Scotland) SCO	James Jones	45	3	28+8	1	0+2	1	3	1	1+3	0	0	0
9	FW	(England) ENG	Tom Hopper	48	11	33+6	8	0	0	1+2	1	2+1	0	3	2
10	MF	(England) ENG	Jorge Grant	51	17	35+1	13	1+1	2	3	0	4+3	2	3	0
11	FW	(Republic of Ireland) IRL	Anthony Scully	54	17	22+18	11	2	2	3	1	5+1	3	2+1	0
14	MF	(Scotland) SCO	Theo Archibald	12	1	0+7	0	2	0	0+1	0	2	1	0	0
15	DF	(England) ENG	Cohen Bramall	18	0	12+5	0	0	0	0	0	0+1	0	0	0
16	DF	(Wales) WAL	Joe Walsh	25	0	18+3	0	1	0	0	0	1	0	1+1	0
17	FW	(England) ENG	Remy Howarth	20	2	4+7	1	0	0	0+2	0	5+2	1	0	0
18	MF	(Scotland) SCO	Conor McGrandles	51	4	35+4	4	1+1	0	2+1	0	3+1	0	1+2	0
19	FW	(England) ENG	Callum Morton	21	3	11+6	2	0	0	1+1	1	1	0	0+1	0
20	FW	(Wales) WAL	Brennan Johnson	49	13	38+2	10	2	1	0	0	4	1	3	1
22	DF	(England) ENG	TJ Eyoma	53	1	34+5	1	1	0	3	0	7	0	3	0
23	MF	(Scotland) SCO	Liam Bridcutt	30	0	22+1	0	0	0	1+1	0	2	0	3	0
25	FW	(Republic of Ireland) IRL	Zack Elbouzedi	6	2	0+2	0	0+1	0	0	0	3	2	0	0
26	MF	(England) ENG	Harry Anderson	39	6	14+15	3	2	0	2	0	5	3	0+1	0
27	FW	(England) ENG	Morgan Rogers	28	6	23+2	6	0	0	0	0	0	0	3	0
29	GK	(England) ENG	Ethan Ross	2	0	0	0	0	0	0	0	2	0	0	0
30	DF	(Republic of Ireland) IRL	Sean Roughan	11	0	6	0	1	0	1	0	3	0	0	0
33	DF	(England) ENG	Hayden Cann	2	0	0	0	0	0	0	0	0+2	0	0	0
Players no longer at the club
15	MF	(Finland) FIN	Alex Bradley	3	0	0	0	0	0	2	0	1	0	0	0
21	GK	(England) ENG	Josef Bursik	1	0	0	0	0	0	0	0	0	0	1	0
21	FW	(England) ENG	Jamie Soule	2	1	0+1	0	0	0	0	0	1	1	0	0
24	DF	(England) ENG	Robbie Gotts	12	1	4+3	0	2	0	0	0	3	1	0	0
