= Jamie Soule =

English footballer

Personal information
- Date of birth: 26 November 2000 (age 25)
- Place of birth: Cheltenham, England
- Position: Striker

Team information
- Current team: Weston-super-Mare

Youth career
- 2008–2017: West Bromwich Albion

Senior career*
| Years | Team | Apps | (Gls) |
| 2017–2022 | West Bromwich Albion | 0 | (0) |
| 2020 | → Barrow (loan) | 2 | (0) |
| 2020 | → Lincoln City (loan) | 2 | (1) |
| 2022 | → Cheltenham Town (loan) | 0 | (0) |
| 2023 | Alvechurch | 12 | (5) |
| 2023– | Weston-super-Mare | 7 | (2) |

International career
| 2016-2017 | England U17 | 3 | (0) |
- * Club domestic league appearances and goals as of 18:50, 13 June 2023 (UTC)

Jamie Soule (born 26 November 2000) is an English professional footballer who plays as a striker for National League South club Weston-super-Mare. He has also represented England at youth level.

== Career ==
=== West Bromwich Albion ===
Soule joined West Bromwich Albion as an eight-year-old and progressed throughout Albion's youth system withholding bundles of interest from top clubs in England and Europe. The baggies finally secured Soule's signature as he signed his first professional contract at the age of 17 before continuing to progress at Premier League 2 level. He then agreed a further 2 1/2-year contract 2 years later in the winter of 2019 which came after a significant display in the FA Youth Cup in which he rallied a total of 6 goals and 1 assists in 5 games. Soule was assigned the 32 jersey for the Baggies' 2020-21 season. In June 2022, Soule was released by West Bromwich Albion.

==== Barrow A.F.C. (loan) ====
On 12 February 2020, Soule joined Barrow A.F.C. on a one-month loan deal, making two substitute appearances for the Cumbrian side. Soule was spoken highly of by manager Ian Evatt. Due to the COVID pandemic, Soule had to return to the Hawthorns and was unable to rejoin Barrow due to the season ending early.

==== Lincoln City (loan) ====
On 6 October 2020, it was announced that he had joined Lincoln City on a short-term loan deal. He made his debut the same evening in an EFL Trophy game against Mansfield, and scored the opening goal on his official debut. Due to the teams momentum in the league he had to endure patience and would finally make his first league appearance coming off the bench against Doncaster Rovers on 31 October 2020. He would only make the two outings for Lincoln City before suffering a muscle injury keeping him out until the new year.

==== Cheltenham Town (loan) ====
On 31 January 2022, Soule joined League One side Cheltenham Town on loan until the end of the 2021–22 season.

==== Alvechurch ====
After his release by West Bromwich Albion in the summer of 2022, Soule had some setbacks and did not sign anywhere until February 2023. He has now agreed terms with Alvechurch FC and once again scored on his full debut

== Statistics ==
As of 31 October 2020

Appearances and goals by club, season and competition
| Club | Season | League | | | FA Cup | | EFL Cup | | Other | | Total | |
| Club | Season | Division | Apps | Goals | Apps | Goals | Apps | Goals | Apps | Goals | Apps | Goals |
|---|---|---|---|---|---|---|---|---|---|---|---|---|
| West Bromwich Albion | 2019–20 | Championship | 0 | 0 | 0 | 0 | 0 | 0 | — | | 0 | 0 |
| West Bromwich Albion | 2020–21 | Premier League | 0 | 0 | 0 | 0 | 0 | 0 | — | | 0 | 0 |
| West Bromwich Albion | Total | | 0 | 0 | 0 | 0 | 0 | 0 | 0 | 0 | 0 | 0 |
| Barrow (loan) | 2019-20 | National League | 2 | 0 | 0 | 0 | 0 | 0 | — | | 2 | 0 |
| Lincoln City (loan) | 2020–21 | League One | 1 | 0 | 0 | 0 | 0 | 0 | 1 (Note: Appearances in EFL Trophy) | 1 | 2 | 1 |
| Career total | | | 3 | 0 | 0 | 0 | 0 | 0 | 1 | 1 | 4 | 1 |
