= Cieran Dunne =

Scottish born Irish footballer

Personal information
- Full name: Cieran James Dunne
- Date of birth: 8 February 2000 (age 26)
- Place of birth: Falkirk, Scotland
- Height: 1.79 m (5 ft 10 in)
- Position: Left midfielder

Team information
- Current team: Peterhead
- Number: 29

Youth career
- Hutchison Vale
- 2016–2017: Falkirk
- 2016–2017: → Forth Valley Football Academy

Senior career*
Years	Team	Apps	(Gls)
2016–2019	Falkirk	6	(0)
2019–2022	Sunderland	0	(0)
2022–2023	Cove Rangers	25	(0)
2024–	Peterhead	34	(0)
- * Club domestic league appearances and goals as of 31 May 2025

Cieran James Dunne (born 8 February 2000) is a professional footballer who plays as a midfielder for Scottish League One club Peterhead. He has previously played for Falkirk, Sunderland and Cove Rangers.

== Career ==
Dunne signed a professional contract with Falkirk in 2017, having graduated from the Forth Valley Football Academy.

Dunne moved to Sunderland in August 2019. He made his Sunderland debut in an EFL Trophy tie against Fleetwood Town on 10 November 2020, replacing Oliver Younger just before half-time. His appearance was brief after suffering a dislocated shoulder which saw him replaced in the 51st minute by Vinnie Steels. Dunne was released by Sunderland at the end of the 2021–22 season.

After a trial spell with Doncaster Rovers, Dunne signed for Cove Rangers in August 2022. In May 2023 his contract wasn't renewed with the club relegated from the Scottish championship.

== Career statistics ==
As of match played 25 October 2025

Appearances and goals by club, season and competition
Club	Season	League			National cup (Note: Includes Scottish Cup and FA Cup)		League cup (Note: Includes Scottish League Cup and EFL Cup)		Other		Total	
Club	Season	Division	Apps	Goals	Apps	Goals	Apps	Goals	Apps	Goals	Apps	Goals
Falkirk	2017–18	Scottish Championship	5	0	0	0	0	0	1 (Note: Appearance(s) in Scottish Challenge Cup)	0	6	0
Falkirk	2018–19	Scottish Championship	1	0	0	0	0	0	1	0	2	0
Falkirk	Total		6	0	0	0	0	0	2	0	8	0
Sunderland	2019–20	League One	0	0	0	0	0	0	0	0	0	0
Sunderland	2020–21	League One	0	0	0	0	0	0	1 (Note: Appearance(s) in EFL Trophy)	0	1	0
Sunderland	2021–22	League One	0	0	0	0	0	0	1	0	1	0
Sunderland	Total		0	0	0	0	0	0	2	0	2	0
Cove Rangers	2022–23	Scottish Championship	25	0	2	0	0	0	1	0	28	0
Peterhead	2024–25	Scottish League Two	34	0	2	1	4	0	2	0	42	1
Peterhead	2025–26	Scottish League One	0	0	0	0	1	0	0	0	1	0
Peterhead	Total		34	0	2	1	5	0	2	0	43	1
Career total			65	0	4	1	5	0	7	0	81	1
