= Remy Longdon =

English footballer (born 1997)

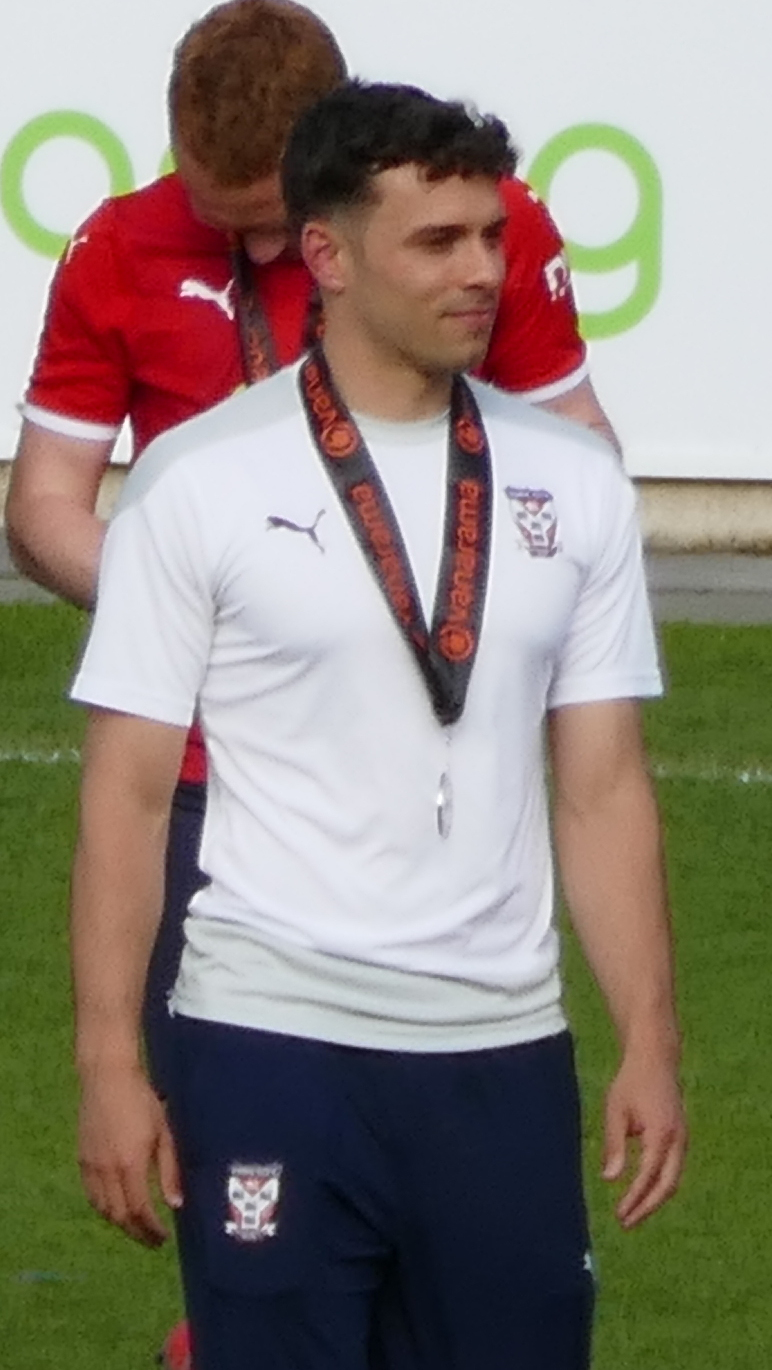
- Longdon with York City in 2022

Personal information
- Full name: Ramirez Longdon
- Date of birth: 14 September 1997 (age 29)
- Position: Midfielder

Youth career
- 2010–2017: Blackburn Rovers

Senior career*
Years	Team	Apps	(Gls)
2016–2017	Blackburn Rovers	0	(0)
2016	→ Bamber Bridge (loan)		
2017	→ Skelmersdale United (loan)		
2017–2018	Skelmersdale United		
2018–2019	Ashton United	5	(0)
2019	West Didsbury & Chorlton		
2019–2020	Cefn Druids	21	(3)
2020–2022	Lincoln City	15	(1)
2021–2022	→ York City (loan)	1	(0)
2022	York City	6	(0)
- * Club domestic league appearances and goals as of 10:53, 22 July 2022 (UTC)

Ramirez "Remy" Longdon (né Howarth; born 14 September 1997) is an English former professional footballer who played as a midfielder.

== Career ==
Howarth began his career with Blackburn Rovers (between the ages of 12 and 19), spending loan spells at Bamber Bridge and Skelmersdale United before signing permanently for Skelmersdale United in August 2017. During his early career he suffered a back injury and was out-of-action for 18 months. He later played for Ashton United, West Didsbury & Chorlton and Cefn Druids, before signing with Lincoln City in September 2020. He made his debut for Lincoln the next day, coming off the bench in the first round of the EFL Cup. He would make his league debut coming off the bench against Bristol Rovers on 10 October 2020. He scored his first goal for Lincoln in an EFL Trophy tie against Shrewsbury Town on 8 December 2020. He signed a contract extension on 25 February 2021, keeping him at the club until the summer of 2022. On 16 December he joined York City on a short-term loan until the end of January 2022. On 21 January 2022, his loan was turned permanent. Longdon suffered health problems shortly afterwards, and was released at the end of the season.

== Personal life ==
He changed his surname from Howarth to Longdon in 2021.

== Career statistics ==
As of 26 March 2022

Appearances and goals by club, season and competition
Club	Season	League			FA Cup		EFL Cup		Other		Total	
Club	Season	Division	Apps	Goals	Apps	Goals	Apps	Goals	Apps	Goals	Apps	Goals
Lincoln City	2020–21	League One	11	1	0	0	2	0	7 (Note: Appearance(s) in the EFL Trophy)	1	20	2
Lincoln City	2021–22	League One	4	0	0	0	1	0	3	0	8	0
Lincoln City	Total		15	1	0	0	3	0	10	1	28	2
York City (loan)	2021–22	National League North	1	0	0	0	0	0	1 (Note: Appearance(s) in the FA Trophy)	0	2	0
York City	2021–22	National League North	6	0	0	0	0	0	0	0	6	0
Career total			22	1	0	0	3	0	11	1	36	2
