= Tayo Edun =

English footballer (born 1998)

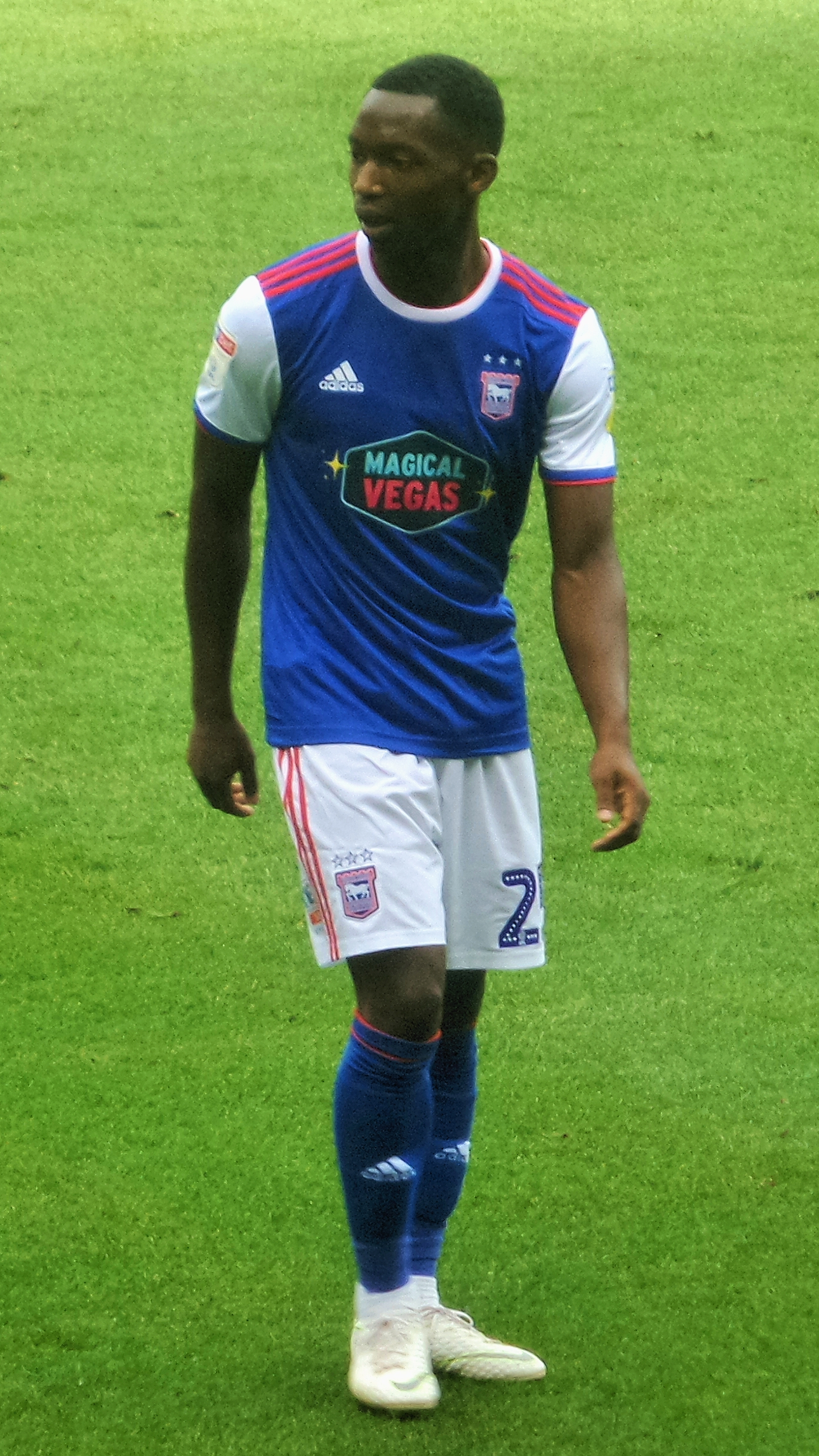
- Edun playing for Ipswich Town in 2018

Personal information
- Full name: Adetayo Oluwatosin Olusegun Adio Aduramigba Iretioluwa Edun
- Date of birth: 14 May 1998 (age 28)
- Place of birth: Islington, England
- Height: 5 ft 10 in (1.77 m)
- Positions: Left-back; midfielder

Team information
- Current team: Stockport County
- Number: 14

Youth career
- –2016: Fulham

Senior career*
Years	Team	Apps	(Gls)
2016–2020	Fulham	2	(0)
2018	→ Ipswich Town (loan)	6	(1)
2020–2021	Lincoln City	51	(2)
2021–2023	Blackburn Rovers	28	(0)
2023–2025	Charlton Athletic	26	(0)
2025	Peterborough United	17	(2)
2025–	Stockport County	27	(2)

International career
2014–2015	England U17	10	(0)
2015–2016	England U18	3	(0)
2016–2017	England U19	14	(1)
2017–2018	England U20	7	(0)
- * Club domestic league appearances and goals as of 22:33, 25 October 2026 (UTC)

Adetayo Oluwatosin Olusegun Adio Aduramigba Iretioluwa Edun (born 14 May 1998), better known as Tayo Edun, is an English professional footballer who plays as a left-back or midfielder for EFL League One club Stockport County.

== Early life ==
Edun was born in Islington, London to a mother from Saint Vincent and the Grenadines and a father from Nigeria, attending Enfield Grammar School.

== Club career ==
=== Fulham ===
On 9 August 2016, Edun made his professional debut for Fulham in a League Cup match against Leyton Orient.

==== Ipswich Town (loan) ====
On 3 August 2018, Edun signed for Ipswich Town on a season-long loan from Fulham. He scored on his debut for the club in a 2–2 draw against Blackburn Rovers on 4 August. He was recalled by Fulham on 31 December due to an eye injury, ending his loan stay early after making just 6 appearances.

=== Lincoln City ===
After leaving Fulham, Edun signed a two-and-a-half-year contract with EFL League One club Lincoln City on 10 January 2020. He would score his first goal for the club against Liverpool in the third round of the EFL Cup on 24 September 2020.

=== Blackburn Rovers ===
On 31 August 2021, Edun joined EFL Championship side Blackburn Rovers.

=== Charlton Athletic ===
On 25 July 2023, Edun joined League One side Charlton Athletic on a two-year deal.

=== Peterborough United ===
On 16 January 2025, Edun joined Peterborough United on a short-term deal until the end of the season. He was cup-tied as Peterborough won the 2024–25 EFL Trophy by beating Birmingham City in the final.

=== Stockport County ===
On 19 June 2025, Edun joined Stockport County on a permanent basis, signing a two-year-contract.

== International career ==
Edun was born in England and is of St Vincent and Nigerian descent. He has represented England at under-17, under-18, under-19 and under-20 level.

Edun was selected to represent the under-17 side at the 2015 UEFA European Under-17 Championship and 2015 FIFA U-17 World Cup.

Edun was included in the England under-19 squad for the 2017 UEFA European Under-19 Championship. He was sent off in the final after receiving two yellow cards, however England held on to defeat Portugal. Edun was subsequently included in the team of the tournament.

== Career statistics ==
As of match played 6 October 2026

Appearances and goals by club, season and competition
Club	Season	League			FA Cup		EFL Cup		Other		Total	
Club	Season	Division	Apps	Goals	Apps	Goals	Apps	Goals	Apps	Goals	Apps	Goals
Fulham	2016–17	Championship	0	0	0	0	3	0	—		3	0
Fulham	2017–18	Championship	2	0	0	0	2	0	—		4	0
Fulham	2018–19	Premier League	0	0	0	0	0	0	—		0	0
Fulham	2019–20	Championship	0	0	0	0	0	0	—		0	0
Fulham	Total		2	0	0	0	5	0	0	0	7	0
Ipswich Town (loan)	2018–19	Championship	6	1	0	0	1	0	—		7	1
Lincoln City	2019–20	League One	6	0	0	0	0	0	0	0	6	0
Lincoln City	2020–21	League One	41	1	2	0	2	1	9 (Note: Six appearances in EFL Trophy and three appearances in League One Play-offs)	0	54	2
Lincoln City	2021–22	League One	4	1	0	0	0	0	0	0	4	1
Lincoln City	Total		51	2	2	0	3	1	9	0	64	3
Blackburn Rovers	2021–22	Championship	20	0	1	0	0	0	—		21	0
Blackburn Rovers	2022–23	Championship	8	0	1	0	4	0	—		13	0
Blackburn Rovers	Total		28	0	2	0	4	0	0	0	34	0
Charlton Athletic	2023–24	League One	26	0	3	0	1	0	3 (Note: Appearance(s) in EFL Trophy)	0	33	0
Charlton Athletic	2024–25	League One	0	0	0	0	1	0	3	1	4	1
Charlton Athletic	Total		26	0	3	0	2	0	6	1	37	1
Peterborough United	2024–25	League One	17	2	—		—		—		17	2
Stockport County	2025–26	League One	24	2	1	0	0	0	6 (Note: Three appearances in EFL Trophy and three appearances in League One Play-offs)	0	31	2
Stockport County	2026–27	League One	3	0	0	0	1	0	2	1	6	1
Stockport County	Total		27	2	1	0	1	0	8	1	37	3
Career total			157	7	8	0	15	1	23	2	203	10

== Honours ==
Stockport County

- EFL Trophy runner-up: 2025–26

England U19

- UEFA European Under-19 Championship: 2017

Individual

- UEFA European Under-19 Championship Team of the Tournament: 2017
