= Lewis Montsma =

Dutch footballer (born 1998)

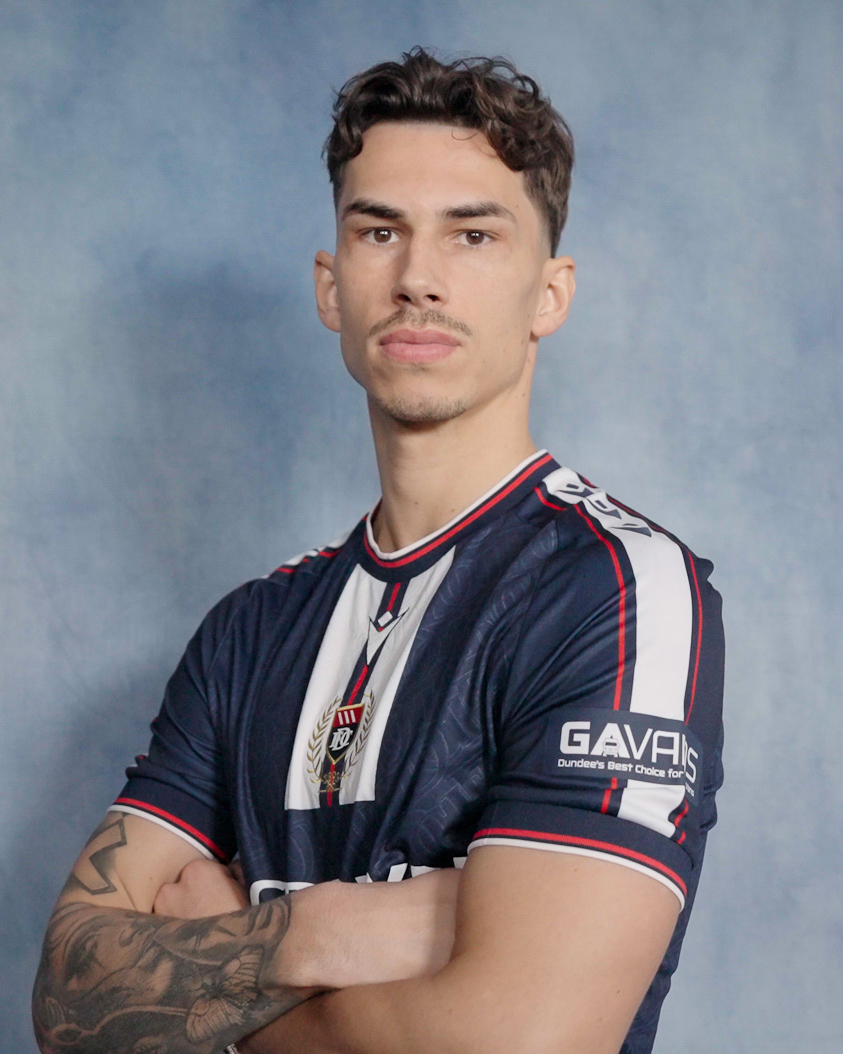
- Lewis Montsma in Dundee colours (2026)

Personal information
- Full name: Lewis Lee Montsma
- Date of birth: 25 April 1998 (age 28)
- Place of birth: Amsterdam, Netherlands
- Height: 1.91 m (6 ft 3 in)
- Position: Centre back

Team information
- Current team: Port Vale
- Number: 22

Youth career
- –2013: AFC
- 2013–2017: Heerenveen
- 2018: Cambuur

Senior career*
Years	Team	Apps	(Gls)
2018–2020	FC Dordrecht	46	(1)
2020–2026	Lincoln City	83	(8)
2026	Dundee	0	(0)
2026–	Port Vale	6	(0)
- * Club domestic league appearances and goals as of 23:43, 24 September 2026 (UTC)

Lewis Lee Montsma (born 25 April 1998) is a Dutch professional footballer who plays as a centre-back for EFL League Two club Port Vale.

Montsma made his Eerste Divisie debut for FC Dordrecht in August 2018 and played 46 league games in two seasons. He signed with English club Lincoln City in July 2020, where he would make 108 league and cup appearances in five-and-a-half seasons, his contributions limited by two ACL injuries. He joined Scottish club Dundee on a short-term deal in February 2026 and returned to England with Port Vale five months later.

== Early and personal life ==
Montsma's mother is Swedish, making him eligible to play for Sweden internationally. He attended St Nicolaaslyceum alongside Matthijs de Ligt, with whom he regularly played football. Alongside his early football career, he also worked as a model, including for Burberry.

== Career ==
=== Early career ===
Montsma began his career at AFC. He damaged his right knee whilst in the academy at Heerenveen. He then joined the under-21s at Cambuur. He made his Eerste Divisie debut for FC Dordrecht on 31 August 2018 in a game against NEC, as a starter. He played 46 games in two seasons at the Stadion Krommedijk, scoring one goal.

=== Lincoln City ===
On 14 July 2020, Montsma joined English League One club Lincoln City on a three-year contract, on a free transfer. He scored on his debut for the Imps in 2–1 win at Crewe Alexandra in the EFL Cup on 5 September. He continued his goalscoring run, scoring in the second and third round of the EFL Cup against Bradford City and Premier League champions Liverpool. He also scored his first league goal in a 2–0 victory over Charlton Athletic at Sincil Bank on 27 September. Lincoln reached the play-off final at Wembley and Montsma came on as a late substitute during what ended as a 2–1 defeat to Blackpool. He was named on the PFA Team of the Year in League One for the 2020–21 season.

On 8 January 2022, Montsma sustained an Anterior cruciate ligament injury on his left knee against Oxford United and was ruled out of action for nine months. Following his surgery on his ACL, he signed a new two-year contract. After just over a year from his injury, Montsma returned to competitive football on 28 January 2023 against Cambridge United. He picked up a similar knee injury a few months later against Fleetwood Town, which would see him miss the remainder of the 2022–23 season. It was later confirmed that he had ruptured his ACL again as well as other knee damage, and he would undergo a further 12 months of rehabilitation.

Despite not playing during the 2023–24 season, the club offered him a new contract, with a short-term contract of six months signed in July. He made his return from injury after 15 months out in a 2–1 defeat to Harrogate Town in the EFL Cup on 13 August 2024. He started his first league game in 581 days on 26 October, saying it was "a long graft" to recover from his injury. In December, he signed a multi-year contract extension to run until 2027. He did not feature in League One under Michael Skubala in the first half of the 2025–26 campaign. He was linked with a move to Shrewsbury Town, managed by former Lincoln boss Michael Appleton. Sporting director Jez George published an open letter upon Montsma's departure, in which he called him a "special player" and "special person".

=== Dundee ===
On 2 February 2026, Montsma signed for Scottish Premiership club Dundee on a short-term permanent deal with an option to extend. With Luke Graham and Ryan Astley as an established centre-back partnership at Dens Park, he left the club at the end of the 2025–26 season, having not played once for Steven Pressley's Dark Blues.

=== Port Vale ===
He had a trial with Port Vale in July 2026, and signed a one-year deal with the club on 31 July.

== Style of play ==
Montsma is a two-footed ball-playing centre back who is able to score from direct free kicks.

== Career statistics ==
As of match played 7 November 2026

Appearances and goals by club, season and competition
Club	Season	League			National Cup (Note: Includes KNVB Cup, FA Cup, Scottish Cup)		League Cup (Note: Includes EFL Cup, Scottish League Cup)		Other		Total	
Club	Season	Division	Apps	Goals	Apps	Goals	Apps	Goals	Apps	Goals	Apps	Goals
FC Dordrecht	2018–19	Eerste Divisie	23	1	1	0	—		0	0	24	1
FC Dordrecht	2019–20	Eerste Divisie	23	0	1	0	—		0	0	24	0
FC Dordrecht	Total		46	1	2	0	0	0	0	0	48	1
Lincoln City	2020–21	League One	40	6	0	0	3	3	6 (Note: Appearance(s) in League One Play-offs & EFL Trophy)	0	49	9
Lincoln City	2021–22	League One	19	1	2	0	1	0	4 (Note: Appearance(s) in EFL Trophy)	1	26	2
Lincoln City	2022–23	League One	8	0	0	0	0	0	0	0	8	0
Lincoln City	2023–24	League One	0	0	0	0	0	0	0	0	0	0
Lincoln City	2024–25	League One	16	1	2	0	1	0	2	0	21	1
Lincoln City	2025–26	League One	0	0	1	0	1	0	2	0	4	0
Lincoln City	Total		83	8	5	0	6	3	14	1	108	12
Dundee	2025–26	Scottish Premiership	0	0	0	0	—		—		0	0
Port Vale	2026–27	League Two	6	0	1	0	1	0	1	1	9	1
Career total			135	9	8	0	7	3	15	2	165	14

== Honours ==
Individual

- PFA Team of the Year: 2020–21 League One
