= Anthony Scully =

Irish footballer (born 1999)

Personal information
- Full name: Anthony Richard Scully
- Date of birth: 19 April 1999 (age 27)
- Place of birth: Watford, England
- Position: Forward

Team information
- Current team: Exeter City
- Number: 25

Youth career
- 2011–2016: West Ham United

Senior career*
Years	Team	Apps	(Gls)
2016–2020	West Ham United	0	(0)
2020–2022	Lincoln City	85	(25)
2022–2023	Wigan Athletic	5	(0)
2023–2025	Portsmouth	6	(0)
2024–2025	→ Colchester United (loan)	15	(1)
2025–2026	Shrewsbury Town	31	(3)
2026–	Exeter City	8	(2)

International career^{‡}
- Republic of Ireland U15
- England U16
2015–2016	Republic of Ireland U17	6	(0)
2018	Republic of Ireland U19	1	(0)
2020	Republic of Ireland U21	2	(0)
- * Club domestic league appearances and goals as of 14:08, 4 November 2025 (UTC) ‡ National team caps and goals as of 17:42, 18 March 2021 (UTC)

Anthony Richard Scully (born 19 April 1999) is an Irish professional footballer who plays as a forward for EFL League Two club Exeter City.

== Club career ==
=== Early career ===
Scully joined West Ham United as a youth player in 2011. On 23 May 2016, West Ham announced Scully had signed his first professional contract with the club.

=== Lincoln City ===
On 3 February 2020, after 37 appearances for West Ham's under-23s, Scully signed for League One club Lincoln City. On 15 February 2020, on his first start for Lincoln, Scully scored his maiden goal for the club in a 4–3 loss against Accrington Stanley. He would sign a new contract on 25 February 2021, keeping him at the club until the summer of 2023. His form during September 2021, would see him nominated for the EFL Player of the Month for League One.

=== Wigan Athletic ===
On 1 September 2022, Scully signed for Wigan Athletic for an undisclosed fee.

=== Portsmouth ===
On 16 June 2023 Scully signed for EFL League One side Portsmouth. His playing time was limited with the club throughout 2023–24 due to injury as the side went on to win the league title and promotion to the EFL Championship. He was released by Portsmouth upon the expiration of his contract at the end of the 2024–25 season.

=== Colchester United (loan) ===
On 30 August 2024, deadline day of the 2024 summer transfer window, Scully joined EFL League Two side Colchester United.

=== Shrewsbury Town ===
On 24 July 2025, Scully signed a one-year contract with recently relegated League Two club Shrewsbury Town, teaming up again with Michael Appleton.

=== Exeter City ===
On 3 October 2026, Scully joined Matt Taylor's Exeter City, after their recent relegation to League Two, for a single season. A club that his father, Tony Scully, briefly played for in 2005.

== International career ==
Scully initially represented Ireland's under-15s, before switching allegiances to play for England's under-16 side. Scully later returned to the Irish set-up, captaining the under-17s. He also has represented Ireland at u21 level.

== Personal life ==
Scully's father, Tony, was a professional footballer, playing for Cambridge United, Crystal Palace, Manchester City and Queens Park Rangers.

== Career statistics ==
As of 3 October 2026

Appearances and goals by club, season and competition
Club	Season	League			Domestic Cup		League Cup		Other		Total	
Club	Season	Division	Apps	Goals	Apps	Goals	Apps	Goals	Apps	Goals	Apps	Goals
West Ham United U23	2018–19	Premier League 2	—		—		—		1 (Note: Appearance(s) in EFL Trophy)	0	1	0
West Ham United U23	2019–20	Premier League 2	2			—		—		2	0	2
West Ham United U23	Total		0	0	0	0	0	0	3	2	3	2
Lincoln City	2019–20	League One	5	2	0	0	0	0	0	0	5	2
Lincoln City	2020–21	League One	40	11	2	2	3	1	9 (Note: Appearance(s) in League One Play-offs and EFL Trophy)	3	54	17
Lincoln City	2021–22	League One	35	11	0	0	1	0	3	4	39	15
Lincoln City	2022–23	League One	5	1	0	0	2	2	1	0	8	3
Lincoln City	Total		85	25	2	2	6	3	13	7	106	37
Wigan Athletic	2022–23	Championship	5	0	0	0	0	0	0	0	5	0
Portsmouth	2023–24	League One	6	0	0	0	1	0	2	0	9	0
Portsmouth	2024–25	Championship	0	0	0	0	0	0	0	0	0	0
Portsmouth	Total		6	0	0	0	1	0	2	0	9	0
Colchester United (loan)	2024–25	League Two	15	1	1	0	0	0	2	1	18	2
Shrewsbury Town	2025–26	League Two	31	3	2	2	1	0	1	0	35	5
Exeter City	2026–27	League Two	8	2	0	0	0	0	1	0	9	2
Career total			143	30	4	4	8	3	23	10	185	48

== Honours ==
Portsmouth

- EFL League One: 2023–24
