= 2019–20 Sunderland A.F.C. season =

English football club season

Sunderland
2019–20 season
- Chairman: Stewart Donald
- Manager: Jack Ross (until 8 October); Phil Parkinson (from 17 October)
- Stadium: Stadium of Light
- League One: 8th (on PPG)
- FA Cup: First round
- EFL Cup: Fourth round
- EFL Trophy: Group stage
- Top goalscorer: League: Chris Maguire (10); All: Chris Maguire (11)
- Highest home attendance: 33,821 (vs. Bolton Wanderers)
- Lowest home attendance: 6,952 (vs. Grimsby Town)
- Average home league attendance: 30,169
Home colours	Away colours

The 2019–20 Sunderland A.F.C. season was the club's 141st season in existence, and their second consecutive season in the third tier of English football, after relegation from the Championship in the 2017–18 season. Along with competing in League One, the club participated in the FA Cup and EFL Cup as well as the EFL Trophy. The season covers the period from 1 July 2019 to 30 June 2020. On 3 April, the English Football League decided to postpone all football until safe to do so due to the COVID-19 pandemic, and on 9 June, clubs voted to curtail the season, meaning the final table would be calculated by a points-per-game method with the play-offs being played behind closed doors.

== First team squad ==
Squad No.	Name	Nationality	Position(s)	Age	Ends	Signed from	Apps	Goals
Goalkeepers
1	Jon McLaughlin	(Scotland)	GK	38	2020	(Scotland) Heart of Midlothian	65	0
16	Lee Burge	(England)	GK	33	2021	(England) Coventry City	3	0
43	Anthony Patterson	(England)	GK	26	2020	Academy	0	0
Defenders
2	Conor McLaughlin	(Northern Ireland)	RB	35	2021	(England) Millwall	11	0
3	Joel Lynch	(Wales)	CB	38	2020	(England) Queens Park Rangers	2	0
4	Jordan Willis	(England)	CB	32	2021	(England) Coventry City	11	1
5	Alim Öztürk	(Turkey)	CB	33	2020	(Turkey) Boluspor	28	0
12	Tom Flanagan	(Northern Ireland)	CB	34	2020	(England) Burton Albion	47	2
20	Declan John	(Wales)	LB	31	2020	(Wales) Swansea City (loan)	0	0
26	Bailey Wright	(Australia)	CB	33	2020	(England) Bristol City (loan)	0	0
33	Denver Hume	(England)	LB	28	2021	Academy	21	0
Midfielders
6	Max Power	(England)	CM	33	2021	(England) Wigan Athletic	52	6
7	Chris Maguire	(Scotland)	RW	37	2020	(England) Bury	54	13
11	Lynden Gooch	(United States)	AM	30	2022	Academy	100	12
13	Luke O'Nien	(England)	CM	31	2020	(England) Wycombe Wanderers	62	6
14	Duncan Watmore	(England)	RW	32	2020	(England) Altrincham	66	6
17	Elliot Embleton	(England)	CM	27	2021	Academy	8	0
18	George Dobson	(England)	CM	28	2022	(England) Walsall	11	0
21	Ethan Robson	(England)	CM	29	2020	Academy	14	1
23	Grant Leadbitter	(England)	CM	40	2021	(England) Middlesbrough	149	11
28	Josh Scowen	(England)	CM	33	2022	(England) Queens Park Rangers	0	0
35	Ruben Sammut	(Scotland)	DM	28	2020	(England) Chelsea	0	0
37	Bali Mumba	(England)	CM	24	2021	Academy	9	0
Forwards
8	Kyle Lafferty	(Northern Ireland)	ST	38	2020	(Norway) Sarpsborg 08	0	0
9	Charlie Wyke	(England)	ST	33	2021	(England) Bradford City	39	7
22	Will Grigg	(Northern Ireland)	ST	35	2022	(England) Wigan Athletic	33	5
31	Benjamin Mbunga-Kimpioka	(Sweden)	ST	26	2020	(Sweden) IK Sirius	9	2
42	Antoine Semenyo	(England)	ST	26	2020	(England) Bristol City (loan)	0	0

== Pre-season friendlies ==
As of 12 June 2019 Sunderland has announced three preseason friendlies against South Shields, Benfica B, and Belenenses.

11 July 2019 Friendly	South Shields	0–2	Sunderland	South Shields
19:30 BST		Report	Robson 13'; O'Nien 53'	Stadium: Mariners Park

18 July 2019 Friendly	Benfica B (Portugal)	0–0	Sunderland	Albufeira, Portugal
19:30 WEST		Report		Stadium: Estádio Municipal de Albufeira

20 July 2019 Friendly	Belenenses (Portugal)	1–0	Sunderland	Albufeira, Portugal
19:30 BST	Calila 57'	Report		Stadium: Estádio Municipal de Albufeira

27 July 2019 Friendly	Sunderland	0–1	(Netherlands) Heerenveen	Sunderland
19:00 BST		Report	Faik 69'	Stadium: Stadium of Light; Attendance: 6,645

== Competitions ==
=== League One ===
==== League table ====
Pos	Team	Pld	W	D	L	GF	GA	GD	Pts	PPG	Promotion, qualification or relegation
4	Oxford United	35	17	9	9	61	37	+24	60	1.71	Qualification for League One play-offs (Note: Four teams play for one spot and promotion to the EFL Championship.)
5	Portsmouth	35	17	9	9	53	36	+17	60	1.71	Qualification for League One play-offs
6	Fleetwood Town	35	16	12	7	51	38	+13	60	1.71	Qualification for League One play-offs
7	Peterborough United	35	17	8	10	68	40	+28	59	1.69	
8	Sunderland	36	16	11	9	48	32	+16	59	1.64	
9	Doncaster Rovers	34	15	9	10	51	33	+18	54	1.59	
10	Gillingham	35	12	15	8	42	34	+8	51	1.46	
11	Ipswich Town	36	14	10	12	46	36	+10	52	1.44	
12	Burton Albion	35	12	12	11	50	50	0	48	1.37	

Source: EFL Official Website
Rules for classification: 1) Points per game; 2) Goal difference; 3) Number of goals scored; 4) Head-to-head results; 5) Wins; 6) Away goals; 7) Penalty points (sec 9.5); 8) 12-point sending-off offences

==== Result summary ====
Overall								Home						Away					
Pld	W	D	L	GF	GA	GD	Pts	W	D	L	GF	GA	GD	W	D	L	GF	GA	GD
36	16	11	9	48	32	+16	59	10	8	1	35	13	+22	6	3	8	13	19	−6

Last updated: 10 March 2020.

==== Results by matchday ====
Matchday	1	2	3	4	5	6	7	8	9	10	11	12	13	14	15	16	17	18	19	20	21	22	23	24	25	26	27	28	29	30	31	32	33	34	35	36
Ground	H	A	H	A	H	A	A	H	A	H	A	A	H	A	H	H	H	A	H	H	A	A	H	H	A	H	A	A	H	H	A	H	H	A	H	A
Result	D	D	W	W	W	L	W	D	D	W	L	L	W	L	W	D	L	L	D	D	W	D	W	W	W	D	W	L	W	W	W	W	D	L	D	L
Position	13	15	9	6	4	6	5	4	5	5	6	10	8	8	7	10	11	11	12	15	13	13	9	6	6	7	5	7	6	5	5	4	4	5	5	7
Points	1	2	5	8	11	11	14	15	16	19	19	19	22	22	25	26	26	26	27	28	31	32	35	38	41	42	45	45	48	51	54	57	58	58	59	59

Updated to match(es) played on 10 March 2020. Source: BBC Sport
A = Away; H = Home; W = Win; D = Draw; L = Loss

==== Matches ====
On Thursday, 20 June 2019, the EFL League One fixtures were revealed.

3 August 2019 1	Sunderland	1–1	Oxford United	Sunderland
15:00 BST	Gooch 49' (pen.), (yellow card) 70'	Report	Fosu 14'; Mousinho (yellow card) 56'; Rodriguez (yellow card) 65'; Henry (yellow card) 90+5'; Brannagan (yellow card) 90+5'	Stadium: Stadium of Light; Attendance: 33,498; Referee: Peter Wright

10 August 2019 2	Ipswich Town	1–1	Sunderland	Ipswich
15:00 BST	Jackson (yellow card) 6'; Garbutt 15'	Report	Dobson (yellow card) 61'; Gooch 64'	Stadium: Portman Road; Attendance: 24,051 (1,900 away fans); Referee: Neil Hair

17 August 2019 3	Sunderland	2–1	Portsmouth	Sunderland
12:30 BST	Willis 27'; Maguire 39' (yellow card) 86'; McGeady (yellow card) 79'	Report	Harness 22'; Burgess (yellow card) 76'	Stadium: Stadium of Light; Attendance: 29,140; Referee: Michael Salisbury
Note: Live on Sky Sports

20 August 2019 4	Rochdale	1–2	Sunderland	Rochdale
19:45 BST	Camps 33'	Report	O'Nien (yellow card) 13'; McGeady 28'; Wyke 56', (yellow card) 67'; McLaughlin (yellow card) 66'; Leadbitter (yellow card) 77'	Stadium: Portman Road; Attendance: 5,258 (3,000 away fans); Referee: John Busby

24 August 2019 5	Sunderland	3–1	AFC Wimbledon	Sunderland
15:00 BST	Maguire 8', 53', 79'; Power (yellow card) 36'	Report	Appiah 34', (yellow card) 66'	Stadium: Stadium of Light; Attendance: 29,725; Referee: Anthony Backhouse

31 August 2019 6	Peterborough United	3–0	Sunderland	Peterborough
15:00 BST	Maddison 36', 64'; Toney (yellow card) 51'; Knight 52'	Report	C. McLaughlin (yellow card) 30'; Wyke (yellow card) 57' (yellow-red card) 77'; O'Nien (red card) 71'; Power (yellow card) 84'; Leadbitter (yellow card) 89'	Stadium: Weston Homes Stadium; Attendance: 10,005 (3,200 away fans); Referee: Craig Hicks

7 September 2019	Sunderland	v	Burton Albion	Sunderland
15:00 BST		Report		Stadium: Stadium of Light
Note: The match was postponed on 28 August 2019, due to international call-ups.

14 September 2019 7	Accrington Stanley	1–3	Sunderland	Accrington
15:00 BST	Clark 5'; Alese (yellow card) 83'	Report	Gooch 7'; Leadbitter (yellow card) 24'; McGeady 26'; McNulty 36'	Stadium: Crown Ground; Attendance: 4,164 (2,600 away fans); Referee: Lee Swabey

17 September 2019 8	Sunderland	1–1	Rotherham United	Sunderland
19:45 BST	McNulty 1'; Dobson (yellow card) 30'; C. McLaughlin (yellow card) 41'; McGeady (yellow card) 78'	Report	Hastie 66'	Stadium: Stadium of Light; Attendance: 29,078; Referee: Ben Toner

21 September 2019 9	Bolton Wanderers	1–1	Sunderland	Bolton
15:00 BST	Hobbs 50'; Chicksen (yellow card) 56'; Buckley (yellow card) 80'	Report	Hume (yellow card) 16'; McGeady (yellow card) 23', (goal) 90+2' (pen.); Power (yellow card) 86'; Flanagan (yellow card) 90+3'	Stadium: University of Bolton Stadium; Attendance: 12,026 (5,000 away fans); Referee: Ollie Yates

28 September 2019 10	Sunderland	2–1	Milton Keynes Dons	Sunderland
15:00 BST	O'Nien (yellow card) 13', (goal) 28'; Power 24', (yellow card) 45+1'; Maguire (yellow card) 52'	Report	Kasumu (yellow card) 45+1'; Williams 55'; Martin (yellow card) 65'; Lewington (yellow card) 90'	Stadium: Stadium of Light; Attendance: 29,954; Referee: Paul Marsden

5 October 2019 11	Lincoln City	2–0	Sunderland	Lincoln
15:00 BST	J. McLaughlin 18' (o.g.); Shackell (yellow card) 28'; Andrade (yellow card) 45+1'; Walker 59'; Morrell (yellow card) 71'	Report	Maguire (yellow card) 12'; Lynch (yellow card) 26'; C. McLaughlin (yellow card) 42'; McGeady (yellow card) 90+1'; Wyke (yellow card) 90+5'	Stadium: Sincil Bank; Attendance: 10,264 (2,000 away fans); Referee: Brett Huxtable

12 October 2019	Sunderland	v	Fleetwood Town	Sunderland
15:00 BST		Report		Stadium: Stadium of Light
Note: On 2 October 2019, the match was postponed due to international call-ups.

19 October 2019 12	Wycombe Wanderers	1–0	Sunderland	High Wycombe
15:00 BST	Charles 29'; Wheeler (yellow card) 90+1'	Report	McGeady (yellow card) 82'	Stadium: Adams Park; Attendance: 8,395 (1,800 away fans); Referee: Kevin Johnson

21 October 2019 13	Sunderland	5–0	Tranmere Rovers	Sunderland
17:45 BST	Dobson (yellow card) 10'; Watmore 24'; Maguire 26'; Gooch 39'; Grigg 83'; O'Nien 90'		Ray (yellow card) 25'; Payne (yellow card) 40'	Stadium: Stadium of Light; Attendance: 28,551; Referee: Carl Boyeson

26 October 2019 14	Shrewsbury Town	1–0	Sunderland	Shrewsbury
15:00 BST	Cummings 22'; Norburn (yellow card) 34'	Report	Lynch (yellow card) 34'; Dobson (yellow card) 59'	Stadium: Montgomery Waters Meadow; Attendance: 8,117 (1,800 away fans); Referee: Jarred Gillett

2 November 2019 15	Sunderland	1–0	Southend United	Sunderland
15:00 GMT	O'Nien 20'; C. McLaughlin (yellow card) 84'; O'Nien (yellow card) 90+1'		Hopper (yellow card) 73'	Stadium: Stadium of Light; Attendance: 30,407; Referee: Trevor Kettle

16 November 2019 P	Bristol Rovers	v	Sunderland	Horfield
15:00 GMT		Report		Stadium: Memorial Stadium
Note: On 7 November, the match was postponed due to international call-ups.

23 November 2019 16	Sunderland	1–1	Coventry City	Sunderland
15:00 GMT	Mbunga-Kimpioka 90'; McGeady (yellow card) 90+4'	Report	Hyam 26'; Dabo (yellow card) 78'	Stadium: Stadium of Light; Attendance: 29,809; Referee: Scott Oldham

26 November 2019 17	Sunderland	1–2	Burton Albion	Sunderland
19:45 GMT	McGeady 19' (pen.); Power (yellow card) 29'	Report	Edwards 20'; Quinn (yellow card) 50'; Sarkic (yellow card) 56'; Boyce 68'; Daniel (yellow card) 86'	Stadium: Stadium of Light; Attendance: 26,538; Referee: Robert Lewis

7 December 2019 18	Gillingham	1–0	Sunderland	Gillingham
15:00 GMT				Stadium: Priestfield Stadium

14 December 2019 19	Sunderland	1–1	Blackpool	Sunderland
15:00 GMT	Wyke 37'; Dobson (yellow card) 45+3' (yellow-red card) 74'; Flanagan (yellow card) 59'	Report	Virtue 4'; Gnanduillet (yellow card) 45+3'; Tilt (yellow card) 82'	Stadium: Stadium of Light; Attendance: 30,595; Referee: Ollie Yates

26 December 2019 20	Sunderland	0–0	Bolton Wanderers	Sunderland
15:00 GMT	Flanagan (yellow card) 44'; Hume (yellow card) 89'	Report	Emmanuel (yellow card) 19'; Lowe (yellow card) 21'; Darcy (yellow card) 64'; Bridcutt (yellow card) 81'	Stadium: Stadium of Light; Attendance: 33,821; Referee: Ross Joyce

29 December 2019 21	Doncaster Rovers	1–2	Sunderland	Doncaster
15:00 GMT	Taylor 40'; John (yellow card) 74'	Report	Gooch 6' (yellow card) 55'; Lynch (yellow card) 34'; Maguire 61' (yellow card) 90+1'; Ozturk (yellow card) 70'	Stadium: Keepmoat Stadium; Attendance: 12,432 (4,100 away fans); Referee: Carl Boyeson

1 January 2020 22	Fleetwood Town	1–1	Sunderland	Fleetwood
15:00 GMT	Evans 13' (pen.); Sowerby (yellow card) 71'; Cairns (yellow card) 82'	Report	Willis (yellow card) 65'; Dobson (yellow card) 76'; Maguire 86' (pen.)	Stadium: Highbury Stadium; Attendance: 4,011 (1,100 away fans); Referee: Anthony Backhouse

4 January 2020 23	Sunderland	3–1	Lincoln City	Sunderland
15:00 GMT	Flanagan 19'; Bostwick 23' (o.g.); Gooch 29'; O'Nien (yellow card) 88'	Report	Hesketh (yellow card) 60'; Walker 66'	Stadium: Stadium of Light; Attendance: 31,748; Referee: Leigh Doughty

11 January 2020 24	Sunderland	4–0	Wycombe Wanderers	Sunderland
15:00 GMT	Wyke 6'; Hume 16'; Maguire 21' (pen.), 78' (yellow card) 21'; Lynch (yellow card) 71'	Report	Stewart (yellow card) 20'	Stadium: Stadium of Light; Attendance: 29,331; Referee: Andy Davies

18 January 2020 25	Milton Keynes Dons	0–1	Sunderland	Denbigh
15:00 GMT	Kasumu (yellow card) 18'; Healey (yellow card) 89'	Report	Dobson (yellow card) 26'; Öztürk (yellow card) 68'; Gooch 79' (yellow card) 80'; Maguire (yellow card) 90+5'	Stadium: Stadium MK; Attendance: 13,327 (4,500 away fans); Referee: Ben Toner

24 January 2020 26	Sunderland	0–0	Doncaster Rovers	Sunderland
19:45 GMT	Wyke (yellow card) 42'; Öztürk (yellow card) 73'	Report	Halliday (yellow card) 66'	Stadium: Stadium of Light; Attendance: 30,251; Referee: James Adcock

29 January 2020 27	Tranmere Rovers	0–1	Sunderland	Birkenhead
19:45 GMT	Monthé (yellow card) 74' (yellow-red card) 84'; Wilson (yellow card) 77'; Jennings (yellow card) 90'	Report	Dobson (yellow card) 24'; Lynch (yellow card) 48'; Wyke 60'; Maguire (yellow card) 88'	Stadium: Prenton Park; Attendance: 6,850 (1,500 away fans); Referee: Antony Coggins

1 February 2020 28	Portsmouth	2–0	Sunderland	Milton
15:00 GMT	Burgess 25'; Seddon (yellow card) 45+1'; Bolton 52'; Raggett (yellow card) 71'	Report	Gooch (yellow card) 45+1'; Dobson (yellow card) 70'; Semenyo (yellow card) 90+1'	Stadium: Fratton Park; Attendance: 18,531 (2,200 away fans); Referee: Chris Sarginson

8 February 2020 29	Sunderland	1–0	Ipswich Town	Sunderland
15:00 GMT	O'Nien (yellow card) 21'; Flanagan (yellow card) 75'; Maguire 81'	Report	Downes (yellow card) 23'; Chambers (yellow card) 54'	Stadium: Stadium of Light; Attendance: 32,726; Referee: Jeremy Simpson

11 February 2020 30	Sunderland	3–0	Rochdale	Sunderland
19:45 GMT	Gooch 11'; O'Connell (o.g.) 15'; Gooch 32'	Report	Henderson (yellow card) 24'	Stadium: Stadium of Light; Attendance: 27,401; Referee: Graham Salisbury

15 February 2020 31	Oxford United	0–1	Sunderland	Oxford
15:00 GMT	Brannagan (yellow card) 90+2'	Report	Willis 2'	Stadium: Kassam Stadium; Attendance: 9,105 (1,800 away fans); Referee: Kevin Johnson

22 February 2020 32	Sunderland	3–0	Bristol Rovers	Sunderland
15:00 GMT	Gooch (yellow card) 31' (goal) 71'; Ozturk (yellow card) 58'; Wyke 73'; O'Nien 82'	Report	Leahy (yellow card) 8'; Craig (yellow card) 55'; Ogogo (red card) 59'	Stadium: Stadium of Light; Attendance: 31,541; Referee: Ben Toner

25 February 2020 33	Sunderland	1–1	Fleetwood Town	Sunderland
19:45 GMT	Power (yellow card) 14' (goal) 90+7'; Ozturk (yellow card) 53'	Report	McKay 5'; Madden (yellow card) 78'; Coyle (yellow card) 80'	Stadium: Stadium of Light; Attendance: 28,255; Referee: Scott Oldham

1 March 2020 34	Coventry City	1–0	Sunderland	Bordesley
12:00 GMT	Godden 2'; Maroši (yellow card) 31'	Report		Stadium: St Andrew's Trillion Trophy Stadium; Attendance: 10,055 (3,500 away fans); Referee: Michael Salisbury

7 March 2020 35	Sunderland	2–2	Gillingham	Sunderland
15:00 GMT	Öztürk (yellow card) 42'; Lafferty 64', 83'	Report	Graham (yellow card) 42'; Roberts (yellow card) 43'; O'Keefe (yellow card) 44'; Mandron 74', 90+6'	Stadium: Stadium of Light; Attendance: 29,872; Referee: Antony Coggins

10 March 2020 36	Bristol Rovers	2–0	Sunderland	Horfield
19:45 GMT	Leahy (yellow card) 30'; Clarke-Harris 39', 75' (pen.); Hargreaves (yellow card) 45+1'; Clarke (yellow card) 68'	Report	Lafferty (yellow card) 38'; Öztürk (yellow card) 42'; Flanagan (yellow card) 45+6'	Stadium: Memorial Stadium; Attendance: 7,281 (1,500 away fans); Referee: Charles Breakspear

14 March 2020	Blackpool	v	Sunderland	Blackpool
15:00 GMT				Stadium: Bloomfield Road
Note: Season was suspended until 3 April 2020, due to the COVID-19 pandemic.

28 March 2020	Southend United	v	Sunderland	Southend-on-Sea
15:00 GMT				Stadium: Roots Hall
Note: Season was suspended until 3 April 2020, due to the COVID-19 pandemic.

4 April 2020	Sunderland	v	Shrewsbury Town	Sunderland
15:00 GMT				Stadium: Stadium of Light
Note: On 3 April, the English Football League decided to postpone all football until safe to do so due to the COVID-19 pandemic.

10 April 2020	AFC Wimbledon	v	Sunderland	Norbiton
15:00 BST				Stadium: Cherry Red Records Stadium
Note: On 3 April, the English Football League decided to postpone all football until safe to do so due to the COVID-19 pandemic.

13 April 2020	Sunderland	v	Peterborough United	Sunderland
13:00 BST				Stadium: Stadium of Light
Note: On 3 April, the English Football League decided to postpone all football until safe to do so due to the COVID-19 pandemic.

18 April 2020	Burton Albion	v	Sunderland	Burton upon Trent
15:00 BST				Stadium: Pirelli Stadium
Note: On 3 April, the English Football League decided to postpone all football until safe to do so due to the COVID-19 pandemic.

25 April 2020	Sunderland	v	Accrington Stanley	Sunderland
15:00 BST				Stadium: Stadium of Light
Note: On 3 April, the English Football League decided to postpone all football until safe to do so due to the COVID-19 pandemic.

3 May 2020	Rotherham United	v	Sunderland	Rotherham
15:00 BST				Stadium: AESSEAL New York Stadium
Note: On 3 April, the English Football League decided to postpone all football until safe to do so due to the COVID-19 pandemic.

=== FA Cup ===
The first round draw was made on 21 October 2019.

9 November 2019 First round	Sunderland	1–1	Gillingham	Sunderland
13:00 GMT	McGeady 15'; Willis (yellow card) 42'; O'Nien (yellow card) 90+2'	Report	Hanlan (yellow card) 29'; Lee 46'	Stadium: Stadium of Light; Attendance: 7,892; Referee: Michael Salisbury

19 November 2019 First round replay	Gillingham	1–0 (a.e.t.)	Sunderland	Gillingham
19:45 GMT	Ehmer (yellow card) 45+1'; Hanlan 105'	Report	De Bock (yellow card) 55'; O'Nien (yellow card) 85' Connelly (yellow card) 117'	Stadium: Priestfield Stadium; Attendance: 3,561; Referee: Alan Young

=== EFL Cup ===
The first round draw was made on 20 June. The second round draw was made on 13 August 2019 following the conclusion of all but one first-round matches. The third round draw was confirmed on 28 August 2019, live on Sky Sports. The draw for the fourth round was made on 25 September 2019.

13 August 2019 First round	Accrington Stanley	1–3	Sunderland	Accrington
19:45 BST	J. Maguire (yellow card) 53'; Barclay (yellow card) 58'; Bishop 61'	Report	McNulty 17'; C. Maguire (yellow card) 51'; McGeady 79'; Wyke 90+4'	Stadium: Wham Stadium; Attendance: 2,343; Referee: Darren Drysdale

28 August 2019 Second round	Burnley	1–3	Sunderland	Burnley
19:45 BST	Rodriguez 11'	Report	Grigg 35'; Flanagan 47'; Dobson 50'	Stadium: Turf Moor; Attendance: 7,445; Referee: Darren England

25 September 2019 Third round	Sheffield United	0–1	Sunderland	Sheffield
19:45 BST	Fleck (yellow card) 77'	Report	Power 9'; Maguire (yellow card) 90'	Stadium: Bramall Lane; Attendance: 11,675; Referee: Tim Robinson

29 October 2019 Fourth round	Oxford United	1–1 (4–2 p)	Sunderland	Oxford
19:45 GMT	Hall 25'	Report	McNulty 78'	Stadium: Kassam Stadium; Attendance: 11,108; Referee: Steve Martin
	Penalties
	Henry (penalty scored); Forde (penalty scored); Fosu (penalty scored); Mousinho (penalty scored)		Power (penalty scored); O'Nien (penalty scored); Grigg (penalty missed); McNulty (penalty missed)

=== EFL Trophy ===
On 9 July 2019, the pre-determined group stage draw was announced with Invited clubs to be drawn on 12 July 2019.

==== Group A ====
Pos	Div	Team	Pld	W	PW	PL	L	GF	GA	GD	Pts	Qualification
1	ACA	Leicester City U21	3	2	1	0	0	5	3	+2	8	Advance to Round 2
2	L2	Scunthorpe United	3	2	0	1	0	6	2	+4	7	Advance to Round 2
3	L1	Sunderland	3	1	0	0	2	4	7	−3	3	
4	L2	Grimsby Town	3	0	0	0	3	4	7	−3	0	

Source: EFL.com

8 October 2019 Group Game 1	Sunderland	3–2	Grimsby Town	Sunderland
19:45 BST	Watmore 68'; Dobson (yellow card) 70'; McNulty 79'; Grigg 86'	Report	Green 59'; Ogbu 81'	Stadium: Stadium of Light; Attendance: 6,952; Referee: Steve Martin

5 November 2019 Group Game 2	Sunderland	1–2	Leicester City U21	Sunderland
19:45 BST	Maguire 14'; Leadbitter (yellow card) 45+1'; McLaughlin (yellow card) 49'	Report	Hirst 50' (pen.) (yellow card) 78'; Dewsbury-Hall 53'; Benković (yellow card) 75'	Stadium: Stadium of Light; Attendance: 7,649; Referee: Ross Joyce

12 November 2019 Group Game 3	Scunthorpe United	3–0	Sunderland	Scunthorpe
19:45 GMT	Novak 66' (pen.), 90+1'; Eisa 88'	Report	O'Nien (red card) 65'	Stadium: Glanford Park

== Squad statistics ==
=== Top scorers ===
As of 16 February 2020

Rnk	Pos	No.	Player	League One	FA Cup	EFL Cup	EFL Trophy	Total
1	MF	7	(Scotland) Chris Maguire	10	0	0	1	11
2	MF	11	(United States) Lynden Gooch	9	0	0	0	9
3	MF	19	(Republic of Ireland) Aiden McGeady	4	1	1	0	6
4	FW	9	(England) Charlie Wyke	4	0	1	0	5
4	FW	10	(Scotland) Marc McNulty	2	0	2	1	5
5	MF	13	(England) Luke O'Nien	3	0	0	0	3
5	FW	22	(Northern Ireland) Will Grigg	1	0	1	1	3
6	MF	6	(England) Max Power	1	0	1	0	2
6	DF	12	(Northern Ireland) Tom Flanagan	1	0	1	0	2
6	MF	14	(England) Duncan Watmore	1	0	0	1	2
7	DF	4	(England) Jordan Willis	1	0	0	0	1
7	MF	18	(England) George Dobson	0	0	1	0	1
7	FW	31	(Sweden) Benjamin Mbunga-Kimpioka	1	0	0	0	1
7	DF	33	(England) Denver Hume	1	0	0	0	1
Total				37	1	8	5	51

=== Appearances and goals ===
As of 5 February 2020

No.	Pos	Nat	Player	Total		League One		FA Cup		EFL Cup		EFL Trophy	
No.	Pos	Nat	Player	Apps	Goals	Apps	Goals	Apps	Goals	Apps	Goals	Apps	Goals
1	GK	(Scotland) SCO	Jon McLaughlin	27	0	23+1	0	1	0	1	0	1	0
2	DF	(Northern Ireland) NIR	Conor McLaughlin	20	0	12+2	0	1	0	4	0	1	0
3	DF	(Wales) WAL	Joel Lynch	20	0	14+1	0	1	0	2	0	2	0
4	DF	(England) ENG	Jordan Willis	32	1	27	1	1	0	2	0	1+1	0
5	DF	(Turkey) TUR	Alim Öztürk	19	0	15+1	0	1	0	1	0	1	0
6	MF	(England) ENG	Max Power	30	2	22+1	1	2	0	3+1	1	1	0
7	MF	(Scotland) SCO	Chris Maguire	33	10	20+7	9	2	0	2	0	1+1	1
8	FW	(Northern Ireland) NIR	Kyle Lafferty	3	0	0+3	0	0	0	0	0	0	0
9	FW	(England) ENG	Charlie Wyke	23	5	16+4	4	0	0	1+2	1	0	0
11	MF	(United States) USA	Lynden Gooch	25	8	21+1	8	0	0	2	0	0+1	0
12	DF	(Northern Ireland) NIR	Tom Flanagan	14	2	8+2	1	0	0	3	1	1	0
13	MF	(England) ENG	Luke O'Nien	35	3	27	3	2	0	3+1	0	2	0
14	MF	(England) ENG	Duncan Watmore	19	2	6+8	1	1+1	0	0	0	3	1
16	GK	(England) ENG	Lee Burge	11	0	5	0	1	0	3	0	2	0
17	MF	(England) ENG	Elliot Embleton	5	0	1+2	0	0	0	2	0	0	0
18	MF	(England) ENG	George Dobson	29	1	19+3	0	1	0	2+2	1	2	0
20	DF	(Wales) WAL	Declan John	0	0	0	0	0	0	0	0	0	0
21	MF	(England) ENG	Ethan Robson	0	0	0	0	0	0	0	0	0	0
22	FW	(Northern Ireland) NIR	Will Grigg	26	3	8+11	1	2	0	2+1	1	1+1	1
23	MF	(England) ENG	Grant Leadbitter	20	0	11+3	0	1	0	2	0	3	0
26	DF	(Australia) AUS	Bailey Wright	2	0	2	0	0	0	0	0	0	0
28	MF	(England) ENG	Josh Scowen	1	0	0+1	0	0	0	0	0	0	0
29	MF	(Scotland) SCO	Cieran Dunne	0	0	0	0	0	0	0	0	0	0
30	DF	(England) ENG	Jack Bainbridge	1	0	0	0	0+1	0	0	0	0	0
31	FW	(Sweden) SWE	Benjamin Mbunga-Kimpioka	5	1	0+4	1	0	0	0	0	1	0
32	GK	(Algeria) ALG	Ahmed Abdelkader	0	0	0	0	0	0	0	0	0	0
33	DF	(England) ENG	Denver Hume	30	1	22+2	1	1	0	2+1	0	2	0
35	MF	(Scotland) SCO	Ruben Sammut	0	0	0	0	0	0	0	0	0	0
37	MF	(England) ENG	Bali Mumba	1	0	0	0	0	0	0	0	1	0
39	FW	(England) ENG	Jack Diamond	0	0	0	0	0	0	0	0	0	0
40	DF	(England) ENG	Brandon Taylor	2	0	0	0	1	0	0	0	1	0
41	FW	(Scotland) SCO	Lee Connelly	2	0	0	0	0+1	0	0	0	0+1	0
42	FW	(England) ENG	Antoine Semenyo	1	0	0+1	0	0	0	0	0	0	0
43	GK	(England) ENG	Anthony Patterson	0	0	0	0	0	0	0	0	0	0
44	FW	(England) ENG	Cole Kiernan	1	0	0	0	0	0	0	0	0+1	0
45	MF	(England) ENG	Daniel Neil	0	0	0	0	0	0	0	0	0	0
Players who have played for Sunderland this season but are currently out on loan:
15	DF	(England) ENG	Jack Baldwin	1	0	0	0	0	0	1	0	0	0
19	MF	(Republic of Ireland) IRL	Aiden McGeady	21	6	13+2	4	1+1	1	1+1	1	1+1	0
Players who have played for Sunderland this season but have left the club:
8	MF	(Scotland) SCO	Dylan McGeouch	12	0	5+3	0	0+1	0	2	0	1	0
10	FW	(Scotland) SCO	Marc McNulty	21	4	7+8	2	0+1	0	2	2	3	0
28	DF	(Belgium) BEL	Laurens De Bock	10	0	4+1	0	2	0	1	0	1+1	0

=== Disciplinary record ===
As of 5 February 2020

No.	Pos.	Name	League One			FA Cup			EFL Cup			EFL Trophy			Total		
No.	Pos.	Name	Booked	(yellow card) (yellow-red card)	Sent off (straight red)	Booked	(yellow card) (yellow-red card)	Sent off (straight red)	Booked	(yellow card) (yellow-red card)	Sent off (straight red)	Booked	(yellow card) (yellow-red card)	Sent off (straight red)	Booked	(yellow card) (yellow-red card)	Sent off (straight red)
2	DF	Conor McLaughlin	5									1			6		
3	DF	Joel Lynch	5												4		
4	DF	Jordan Willis	1			1						1			3		
5	DF	Alim Öztürk	4												2		
6	MF	Max Power	5									1			6		
7	MF	Chris Maguire	7						2						7		
9	FW	Charlie Wyke	4												3		
11	MF	Lynden Gooch	5												3		
12	DF	Tom Flanagan	4												4		
13	MF	Luke O'Nien	4		1									1	4		2
18	MF	George Dobson	9									1			7		
19	MF	Aiden McGeady	6												6		
23	MF	Grant Leadbitter	3									1			4		
28	DF	Laurens De Bock				1									1		
33	DF	Denver Hume	2												2		
41	FW	Lee Connelly				1									1		
42	FW	Antoine Semenyo	1												1		
Total			65	0	1	3	0	0	2	0	0	5	0	1	75	0	2

== Transfers ==
=== Transfers in ===
Date from	Position	Nationality	Name	From	Fee	Ref.
1 July 2019	RB	(Northern Ireland)	Conor McLaughlin	(England) Millwall	Free	
2 July 2019	GK	(Algeria)	Ahmed Abdelkader	(Cyprus) ENAD Polis Chrysochous	Free	
3 July 2019	GK	(England)	Lee Burge	(England) Coventry City	Free	
4 July 2019	CM	(Scotland)	Ruben Sammut	(England) Chelsea	Free	
4 July 2019	CB	(England)	Michael Collins	(England) Everton	Free	
13 July 2019	CB	(England)	Jordan Willis	(England) Coventry City	Free	
25 July 2019	CM	(England)	George Dobson	(England) Walsall	Undisclosed	
23 August 2019	LM	(Scotland)	Cieran Dunne	(Scotland) Falkirk	Free	
26 August 2019	CB	(Wales)	Joel Lynch	(England) Queens Park Rangers	Free	
2 September 2019	CM	(England)	Nathan Greenwood	(England) Seaham Red Star	Free	
10 January 2020	CF	(Northern Ireland)	Kyle Lafferty	(Norway) Sarpsborg 08	Free	
27 January 2020	CM	(England)	Josh Scowen	(England) Queens Park Rangers	Undisclosed	
21 February 2020	CB	(New Zealand)	Tommy Smith	(United States) Colorado Rapids	Free	

=== Loans in ===
Date from	Position	Nationality	Name	From	Date until	Ref.
24 July 2019	ST	(Scotland)	Marc McNulty	(England) Reading	31 January 2020	
2 September 2019	LB	(Belgium)	Laurens De Bock	(England) Leeds United	1 January 2020	
21 January 2020	CB	(Australia)	Bailey Wright	(England) Bristol City	30 June 2020	
31 January 2020	LB	(Wales)	Declan John	(Wales) Swansea City	30 June 2020	
31 January 2020	LW	(England)	Antoine Semenyo	(England) Bristol City	30 June 2020	

=== Loans out ===
Date from	Position	Nationality	Name	To	Date until	Ref.
20 August 2019	DM	(England)	Jordan Hunter	(England) South Shields	30 June 2020	
22 August 2019	CF	(Scotland)	Lee Connelly	(England) South Shields	September 2019	
2 September 2019	CB	(England)	Jack Baldwin	(England) Salford City	June 2020	
2 September 2019	CF	(England)	Jack Diamond	(England) Harrogate Town	30 June 2020	
2 September 2019	CM	(England)	Ethan Robson	(England) Grimsby Town	January 2020	
18 October 2019	CM	(England)	Jake Hackett	(England) Whitby Town	4 January 2020	
10 January 2020	CF	(Scotland)	Lee Connelly	(Scotland) Alloa Athletic	30 June 2020	
31 January 2020	LW	(Republic of Ireland)	Aiden McGeady	(England) Charlton Athletic	30 June 2020	
5 March 2020	DM	(England)	Bali Mumba	(England) South Shields	30 June 2020	

=== Transfers out ===
Date from	Position	Nationality	Name	To	Fee	Ref.
1 July 2019	DM	(England)	Lee Cattermole	(Netherlands) VVV-Venlo	Mutual consent	
1 July 2019	LB	(England)	Reece James	(England) Doncaster Rovers	Undisclosed	
1 July 2019	GK	(England)	Max Johnstone	(Scotland) St Johnstone	Released	
1 July 2019	CB	(Ivory Coast)	Lamine Koné	(France) Strasbourg	Undisclosed	
1 July 2019	RB	(Wales)	Adam Matthews	(England) Charlton Athletic	Released	
1 July 2019	AM	(England)	Luke Molyneux	(England) Hartlepool United	Released	
1 July 2019	GK	(Netherlands)	Robbin Ruiter	(Netherlands) PSV Eindhoven	Released	
1 July 2019	CF	(Scotland)	Connor Shields	(England) Aldershot Town	Released	
1 July 2019	CB	(England)	Alex Storey	(England) Sunderland RCA	Released	
1 July 2019	GK	(Poland)	Max Stryjek	(England) Eastleigh	Released	
1 July 2019	CB	(Australia)	Jacob Young	(Germany) Hoffenheim	Undisclosed	
11 July 2019	RB	(Scotland)	Donald Love	(England) Shrewsbury Town	Mutual consent	
29 July 2019	LB	(Costa Rica)	Bryan Oviedo	(Denmark) FC Copenhagen	Undisclosed	
2 August 2019	AM	(England)	George Honeyman	(England) Hull City	Undisclosed	
17 August 2019	CB	(France)	Rayed Derbali	(Tunisia) CA Bizertin	Undisclosed	
22 August 2019	CB	(Netherlands)	Glenn Loovens	Free agent	Released	
7 January 2020	CM	(Scotland)	Dylan McGeouch	(Scotland) Aberdeen	Undisclosed	
11 March 2020	LB	(France)	Williams Kokolo	(England) Middlesbrough	Free transfer	
