= 2018–19 Sunderland A.F.C. season =

English football club season

Sunderland
2018–19 season
- Chairman: Stewart Donald
- Manager: Jack Ross
- Stadium: Stadium of Light
- League One: 5th
- FA Cup: Second-round replay
- EFL Cup: First round
- EFL Trophy: Runners-up
- Top goalscorer: League: Josh Maja (15); All: Josh Maja (16)
- Highest home attendance: 46,039 (vs. Bradford City)
- Lowest home attendance: 7,644 (vs. Stoke City U21s)
- Average home league attendance: 32,157
| Home colours | Away colours | Third colours |
- All statistics correct as of April 28, 2019.

The 2018–19 season was Sunderland's 140th season in existence, and their first season in the third tier of English football since 1987, after relegation from the Premier League two seasons ago and the Championship the previous season. Along with competing in League One, the club also participated in the FA Cup and EFL Cup as well as the EFL Trophy. The season covered the period from 1 July 2018 to 30 June 2019.

== First team squad ==
| Squad No. | Name | Nationality | Position(s) | Age | Ends | Signed from | Apps | Goals |
Goalkeepers
| 1 | Jon McLaughlin | (Scotland) | GK | 39 | 2020 | (Scotland) Heart of Midlothian | 55 | 0 |
| 25 | Robbin Ruiter | (Netherlands) | GK | 39 | 2019 | (Netherlands) Utrecht | 7 | 0 |
| 32 | Max Stryjek | (Poland) | GK | 30 | 2019 | (Poland) Polonia Warsaw | 0 | 0 |
| 43 | Anthony Patterson | (England) | GK | 26 | 2019 | Academy | 0 | 0 |
Defenders
| 2 | Adam Matthews | (Wales) | RB | 34 | 2019 | (Scotland) Celtic | 66 | 2 |
| 3 | Bryan Oviedo | (Costa Rica) | LB | 36 | 2020 | (England) Everton | 73 | 2 |
| 4 | Glenn Loovens | (Netherlands) | CB | 43 | 2020 | (England) Sheffield Wednesday | 13 | 0 |
| 5 | Alim Öztürk | (Turkey) | CB | 34 | 2020 | (Turkey) Boluspor | 15 | 0 |
| 12 | Tom Flanagan | (Northern Ireland) | CB | 35 | 2020 | (England) Burton Albion | 37 | 2 |
| 15 | Jack Baldwin | (England) | CB | 33 | 2020 | (England) Peterborough United | 41 | 3 |
| 24 | Jack Bainbridge | (England) | CB | 28 | 2019 | (Wales) Swansea City | 2 | 0 |
| 33 | Denver Hume | (England) | LB | 28 | 2021 | Academy | 11 | 0 |
| 38 | Owen Gamble | (England) | RB | 27 | 2019 | Academy | 0 | 0 |
| 40 | Brandon Taylor | (England) | CB | 27 | 2019 | Academy | 1 | 0 |
Midfielders
| 7 | Chris Maguire | (Scotland) | RW | 37 | 2020 | (England) Bury | 37 | 7 |
| 8 | Dylan McGeouch | (Scotland) | AM | 33 | 2020 | (Scotland) Hibernian | 28 | 0 |
| 10 | George Honeyman (C) | (England) | AM | 32 | 2019 | Academy | 93 | 15 |
| 11 | Lynden Gooch | (United States) | AM | 30 | 2022 | Academy | 85 | 9 |
| 13 | Luke O'Nien | (England) | CM | 31 | 2020 | (England) Wycombe Wanderers | 47 | 5 |
| 14 | Duncan Watmore | (England) | RW | 32 | 2020 | (England) Altrincham | 64 | 6 |
| 19 | Aiden McGeady | (Republic of Ireland) | LW | 40 | 2020 | (England) Everton | 76 | 21 |
| 23 | Grant Leadbitter | (England) | CM | 40 | 2021 | (England) Middlesbrough | 139 | 11 |
| 27 | Max Power | (England) | CM | 33 | 2021 | (England) Wigan Athletic | 41 | 4 |
| 34 | Jake Hackett | (England) | CM | 26 | 2019 | Academy | 3 | 0 |
| 37 | Bali Mumba | (England) | CM | 25 | 2021 | Academy | 9 | 0 |
| 45 | Daniel Neil | (England) | CM | 17 | 2020 | Academy | 1 | 0 |
| 47 | Jordan Hunter | (England) | DM | 26 | 2019 | (England) Liverpool | 1 | 0 |
Forwards
| 9 | Charlie Wyke | (England) | ST | 33 | 2021 | (England) Bradford City | 26 | 5 |
| 22 | Will Grigg | (Northern Ireland) | ST | 35 | 2022 | (England) Wigan Athletic | 18 | 5 |
| 26 | Kazaiah Sterling | (England) | ST | 28 | 2019 | (England) Tottenham Hotspur (loan) | 6 | 1 |
| 39 | Jack Diamond | (England) | ST | 26 | 2019 | Academy | 3 | 0 |
| 41 | Lee Connelly | (Scotland) | ST | 27 | 2019 | (Scotland) Queen's Park | 3 | 0 |
| 48 | Benjamin Mbunga-Kimpioka | (Sweden) | ST | 26 | 2020 | (Sweden) IK Sirius | 9 | 2 |

== Pre-season friendlies ==
As of 18 July 2018, Sunderland have announced five pre-season friendlies against Darlington, Hartlepool United, Grimsby Town, St Mirren, and Middlesbrough.

| 10 July 2018 Friendly | Darlington | 1–0 | Sunderland | Darlington |
| 19:30 BST | Nicholson 9' | Report | | Stadium: Blackwell Meadows; Attendance: 1,336 |

| 14 July 2018 Friendly | Hartlepool United | 1–1 | Sunderland | Hartlepool |
| 15:00 BST | Muir 19' | Report | Kimpioka 90' | Stadium: Victoria Park; Attendance: 3,734 |

| 17 July 2018 Friendly | Grimsby Town | 0–1 | Sunderland | Cleethorpes |
| 19:30 BST | | Report | Gooch 30' | Stadium: Blundell Park; Attendance: 1,776 |

| 21 July 2018 Friendly | St Mirren (Scotland) | 0–6 | Sunderland | Paisley, Scotland |
| 15:00 BST | | Report | Maja 22', 71'; Gooch 33' (pen.), 56'; Honeyman 77'; Molyneux 86' | Stadium: St Mirren Park; Attendance: 3,133 |

| 27 July 2018 Friendly | Middlesbrough | 0–0; Abandoned | Sunderland | Middlesbrough |
| 19:30 BST | | Report | | Stadium: Riverside Stadium; Attendance: 7,509 |
Note: Match abandoned at Half-time due to storms.

== Competitions ==
=== League One ===
==== League table ====
| Pos | Team | Pld | W | D | L | GF | GA | GD | Pts | Promotion, qualification or relegation |
|---|---|---|---|---|---|---|---|---|---|---|
| 3 | Charlton Athletic (O, P) | 46 | 26 | 10 | 10 | 73 | 40 | +33 | 88 | Qualification for League One play-offs (Note: Four teams play for one spot and promotion to the EFL Championship.) |
| 4 | Portsmouth | 46 | 25 | 13 | 8 | 83 | 51 | +32 | 88 | Qualification for League One play-offs |
| 5 | Sunderland | 46 | 22 | 19 | 5 | 80 | 47 | +33 | 85 | Qualification for League One play-offs |
| 6 | Doncaster Rovers | 46 | 20 | 13 | 13 | 76 | 58 | +18 | 73 | Qualification for League One play-offs |
| 7 | Peterborough United | 46 | 20 | 12 | 14 | 71 | 62 | +9 | 72 | |

Source: EFL Official Website
Rules for classification: 1) Points; 2) Goal difference; 3) Number of goals scored; 4) Head-to-head results
(O) Play-off winners; (P) Promoted

==== Result summary ====
| Overall | | | | | | | | Home | | | | | | Away | | | | | |
| Pld | W | D | L | GF | GA | GD | Pts | W | D | L | GF | GA | GD | W | D | L | GF | GA | GD |
|---|---|---|---|---|---|---|---|---|---|---|---|---|---|---|---|---|---|---|---|
| 46 | 22 | 19 | 5 | 80 | 47 | +33 | 85 | 12 | 10 | 1 | 46 | 25 | +21 | 10 | 9 | 4 | 34 | 22 | +12 |

Last updated: 4 May 2019.

==== Results by matchday ====
| Matchday | 1 | 2 | 3 | 4 | 5 | 6 | 7 | 8 | 9 | 10 | 11 | 12 | 13 | 14 | 15 | 16 | 17 | 18 | 19 | 20 | 21 | 22 | 23 | 24 | 25 | 26 | 27 | 28 | 29 | 30 | 31 | 32 | 33 | 34 | 35 | 36 | 37 | 38 | 39 | 40 | 41 | 42 | 43 | 44 | 45 | 46 |
|---|---|---|---|---|---|---|---|---|---|---|---|---|---|---|---|---|---|---|---|---|---|---|---|---|---|---|---|---|---|---|---|---|---|---|---|---|---|---|---|---|---|---|---|---|---|---|
| Ground | H | A | H | A | A | H | H | A | H | A | H | A | A | A | H | A | H | A | H | H | A | H | H | A | A | H | A | H | A | H | H | H | A | H | A | A | H | A | A | H | H | H | A | H | A | A |
| Result | W | D | W | W | W | D | D | L | W | D | D | W | W | W | W | W | D | D | W | W | L | W | D | W | D | D | D | W | D | D | D | W | W | W | D | D | W | W | W | D | L | W | D | D | L | L |
| Position | 7 | 7 | 4 | 4 | 2 | 4 | 4 | 4 | 3 | 4 | 4 | 3 | 3 | 3 | 3 | 2 | 2 | 2 | 2 | 3 | 3 | 3 | 3 | 3 | 3 | 3 | 3 | 4 | 4 | 4 | 3 | 3 | 3 | 3 | 3 | 3 | 3 | 3 | 3 | 2 | 3 | 3 | 4 | 4 | 4 | 5 |
| Points | 3 | 4 | 7 | 10 | 13 | 14 | 15 | 15 | 18 | 19 | 20 | 23 | 26 | 29 | 32 | 35 | 36 | 37 | 40 | 43 | 43 | 46 | 47 | 50 | 51 | 52 | 53 | 56 | 57 | 58 | 59 | 62 | 65 | 68 | 69 | 70 | 73 | 76 | 79 | 80 | 80 | 83 | 84 | 85 | 85 | 85 |

Updated to match(es) played on 28 April 2019. Source: BBC Sport
A = Away; H = Home; W = Win; D = Draw; L = Loss

==== Matches ====
The fixtures for the 2018–19 season were released on 21 June 2018.

| 4 August 2018 1 | Sunderland | 2–1 | Charlton Athletic | Sunderland |
| 12:30 BST | Maguire (yellow card) 9'; Maja 65'; Gooch (yellow card) 87', (goal) 90+6' | Report | Taylor 10' (pen.); Page (yellow card) 34'; Pearce (yellow card) 42'; Solly (yellow card) 81' | Stadium: Stadium of Light; Attendance: 31,075; Referee: John Brooks |

| 11 August 2018 2 | Luton Town | 1–1 | Sunderland | Luton |
| 15:00 BST | McCormack (yellow card) 56'; Grant (yellow card) 60'; Pearson 68' | Report | Matthews (yellow card) 19'; Maja 45'; Baldwin (yellow card) 61' | Stadium: Kenilworth Road; Attendance: 10,059 (1,047 away); Referee: Charles Breakspear |

| 19 August 2018 3 | Sunderland | 3–0 | Scunthorpe United | Sunderland |
| 15:00 BST | Power 22', (yellow card) 90+4'; Maja 25'; Maguire 42' | Report | Lund (yellow card) 28' | Stadium: Stadium of Light; Attendance: 29,876; Referee: Anthony Backhouse |

| 22 August 2018 4 | Gillingham | 1–4 | Sunderland | Gillingham |
| 19:45 BST | Eaves 3'; Ehmer (yellow card) 51' | Report | Maguire 4'; Honeyman 18'; Power 20'; Cattermole (yellow card) 43'; Maja 59'; Hume (yellow card) 90+3' | Stadium: Priestfield Stadium; Attendance: 8,483 (2,087 away); Referee: Antony Coggins |

| 25 August 2018 5 | AFC Wimbledon | 1–2 | Sunderland | Kingston upon Thames |
| 15:00 BST | Pigott 9' | Report | Baldwin (yellow card) 43'; Cattermole 66', 83' | Stadium: Kingsmeadow; Attendance: 4,848 (727 away); Referee: John Busby |

| 1 September 2018 6 | Sunderland | 1–1 | Oxford United | Sunderland |
| 15:00 BST | Maguire (yellow card) 12'; Cattermole (yellow card) 14'; Power (red card) 19'; Gooch (yellow card) 22'; Oviedo (yellow card) 48'; Wyke 52'; Love (yellow card) 75' | Report | Holmes 16'; Brannagan (yellow card) 26'; Ruffels (yellow card) 61'; Baptiste (yellow card) 71' | Stadium: Stadium of Light; Attendance: 32,193; Referee: Mark Heywood |

| 8 September 2018 7 | Sunderland | 1–1 | Fleetwood Town | Sunderland |
| 15:00 BST | Baldwin (yellow card) 14'; Matthews (yellow card) 33'; Maja 38'; Cattermole (yellow card) 90+4' | Report | Madden 9'; Coyle (yellow card) 12'; Eastham (yellow card) 32'; Cairns (yellow card) 80'; Hunter (yellow card) 81'; Husband (yellow card) 90+1' | Stadium: Stadium of Light; Attendance: 29,367; Referee: Darren Drysdale |

| 15 September 2018 8 | Burton Albion | 2–1 | Sunderland | Burton upon Trent |
| 15:00 BST | Allen 19'; McFadzean 36', (yellow card) 75'; Sbarra (yellow card) 90+3' | Report | Matthews (yellow card) 29'; Cattermole (yellow card) 45'; Maguire 54' | Stadium: Pirelli Stadium; Attendance: 4,566 (1,700 away); Referee: Dean Whitestone |

| 22 September 2018 9 | Sunderland | 4–1 | Rochdale | Sunderland |
| 15:00 BST | Loovens (yellow card) 22'; Maja 37', 45'; Gooch 41' (pen.), 66' | Report | Rafferty (yellow card) 45+3'; Rathbone (yellow card) 51'; Henderson (yellow card) 52'; Done 71'; Hart (yellow card) 85' | Stadium: Stadium of Light; Attendance: 28,764; Referee: Trevor Kettle |

| 29 September 2018 10 | Coventry City | 1–1 | Sunderland | Coventry |
| 12:30 BST | Hyam (yellow card) 9'; Clarke-Harris 68' | Report | Cattermole (yellow card) 30', (goal) 49' | Stadium: Ricoh Arena; Attendance: 16,407 (4,897 away); Referee: Michael Salisbury |

| 2 October 2018 11 | Sunderland | 2–2 | Peterborough United | Sunderland |
| 17:45 BST | Maja 21'; Power (yellow card) 22'; Oviedo (red card) 68'; Sinclair 79' | Report | Ward 74'; Toney 84', (yellow card) 86' | Stadium: Stadium of Light; Attendance: 28,727; Referee: David Coote |

| 6 October 2018 12 | Bradford City | 1–2 | Sunderland | Bradford |
| 15:00 BST | O'Connor 52'; Scannell (red card) 90+4'; Brünker (yellow card) 90+8' | Report | Cattermole (yellow card) 11'; Maja 20'; Baldwin 54'; Power (red card) 66' | Stadium: Valley Parade; Attendance: 19,487 (2,893 away); Referee: Anthony Backhouse |

| 13 October 2018 P | Sunderland | P–P | Blackpool | Sunderland |
| 15:00 BST | | Report | | Stadium: Stadium of Light |
Note: Fixture was postponed due to international call-ups.

| 20 October 2018 13 | Shrewsbury Town | 0–2 | Sunderland | Shrewsbury |
| 15:00 BST | | Report | Cattermole (yellow card) 13'; Beckles 58' (o.g.); O'Nien 84' | Stadium: New Meadow; Attendance: 9,007 (1,640 away); Referee: John Busby |

| 23 October 2018 14 | Doncaster Rovers | 0–1 | Sunderland | Doncaster |
| 19:45 BST | Wilks (yellow card) 28'; Whiteman (yellow card) 28'; Mason (yellow card) 59'; Wright (yellow card) 90'; Butler (yellow card) 90+2' | Report | McGeouch (yellow card) 14'; Cattermole (yellow card) 16'; Honeyman (yellow card) 34'; Maguire 47'; James (yellow card) 49' | Stadium: Keepmoat Stadium; Attendance: 11,881 (3,973 away); Referee: Jeremy Simpson |

| 27 October 2018 15 | Sunderland | 3–0 | Southend United | Sunderland |
| 15:00 BST | Honeyman 29'; Flanagan (yellow card) 45+4'; Maguire 53'; McGeady 80' | Report | Bunn (yellow card) 41'; Yearwood (yellow card) 68' | Stadium: Stadium of Light; Attendance: 30,894; Referee: Robert Lewis |

| 3 November 2018 16 | Plymouth Argyle | 0–2 | Sunderland | Plymouth |
| 15:00 GMT | Sarcevic (yellow card) 49' | Report | McGeady 53', 78' (pen.); McGeouch (yellow card) 60'; Flanagan (yellow card) 61'; O'Nien (yellow card) 84' | Stadium: Home Park; Attendance: 12,065 (1,305 away); Referee: Carl Boyeson |

| 17 November 2018 17 | Sunderland | 1–1 | Wycombe Wanderers | Sunderland |
| 15:00 BST | Honeyman (yellow card) 23'; Maja 84' | Report | Onyedinma 67'; Gape (yellow card) 71' | Stadium: Stadium of Light; Attendance: 30,727; Referee: Michael Salisbury |

| 24 November 2018 18 | Walsall | 2–2 | Sunderland | Walsall |
| 15:00 GMT | Gordon (yellow card) 43', (goal) 46'; Ginnelly 52' | Report | Power (red card) 23'; Honeyman (yellow card) 53'; McGeady 62'; Gooch (yellow card) 75', (goal) 89' | Stadium: Bescot Stadium; Attendance: 7,868 (3,278 away); Referee: Craig Hicks |

| 27 November 2018 19 | Sunderland | 4–2 | Barnsley | Sunderland |
| 17:45 BST | McGeady 19' (pen.); Maja 20'; Gooch 32'; O'Nien 83' | Report | Cavaré (yellow card) 33'; Moore 41', 61'; Pinnock (yellow card) 75' | Stadium: Stadium of Light; Attendance: 28,514; Referee: Andrew Madley |

| 8 December 2018 A | Accrington Stanley | A–A | Sunderland | Accrington |
| 15:00 GMT | Sykes (yellow card) 48'; McConville (yellow card) 49'; Finley (yellow card) 63'; Hall 69' | Report | Maguire (yellow card) 49', (goal) 63' | Stadium: Crown Ground; Attendance: 5,257 (2,604 away); Referee: Oliver Langford |
Note: Game was abandoned in the 74th minute due to severe weather

| 15 December 2018 20 | Sunderland | 2–1 | Bristol Rovers | Sunderland |
| 15:00 BST | Matthews 45+1', (yellow card) 90+5'; Maja 49'; Honeyman (yellow card) 57'; Gooch (yellow card) 83' | Report | Rodman 11'; Upson (yellow card) 36'; Kelly (yellow card) 84'; Clarke (yellow card) 90+6' | Stadium: Stadium of Light; Attendance: 28,971; Referee: Thomas Bramall |

| 22 December 2018 21 | Portsmouth | 3–1 | Sunderland | Portsmouth |
| 15:00 GMT | Hawkins (yellow card) 27'; Evans 48' (pen.); Curtis (yellow card) 52', (goal) 53'; N. Thompson (yellow card) 60'; B. Thompson 63' | Report | Loovens (red card) 47'; Honeyman (yellow card) 54'; O'Nien 57' | Stadium: Fratton Park; Attendance: 19,402 (2,200 away); Referee: Peter Bankes |

| 26 December 2018 22 | Sunderland | 1–0 | Bradford City | Sunderland |
| 15:00 BST | McGeady 31'; Gooch (yellow card) 61'; Flanagan (yellow card) 74'; Oviedo (yellow card) 90+3' | Report | Chicksen (yellow card) 62'; Payne (yellow card) 67'; Caddis (yellow card) 90+2'; O'Brien (yellow card) 90+5' | Stadium: Stadium of Light; Attendance: 46,039; Referee: Darren England |

| 29 December 2018 23 | Sunderland | 1–1 | Shrewsbury Town | Sunderland |
| 15:00 BST | Maja 44'; Cattermole (yellow card) 58'; Baldwin (yellow card) 82' | Report | Waterfall 30'; Norburn (yellow card) 36'; Grant (yellow card) 37'; Docherty (yellow card) 43'; Haynes (yellow card) 87' | Stadium: Stadium of Light; Attendance: 33,288; Referee: Oliver Langford |

| 1 January 2019 24 | Blackpool | 0–1 | Sunderland | Blackpool |
| 15:00 GMT | O'Connor (yellow card) 55' | Report | Cattermole (yellow card) 18'; Maja 23'; Gooch (yellow card) 55' | Stadium: Bloomfield Road; Attendance: 10,994 (8,000 away); Referee: Darren Drysdale |

| 5 January 2019 25 | Charlton Athletic | 1–1 | Sunderland | Charlton |
| 15:00 GMT | James 50' (o.g.) | Report | O'Nien 2'; Baldwin (yellow card) 38'; Power (yellow card) 52' | Stadium: The Valley; Attendance: 16,317 (3,000 away); Referee: Steve Martin |

| 12 January 2019 26 | Sunderland | 1–1 | Luton Town | Sunderland |
| 15:00 BST | Maguire 16', (red card) 90+3'; Flanagan (yellow card) 45'; James (yellow card) 75' | Report | Lee (yellow card) 45+2'; Shinnie (yellow card) 62'; Collins 67' (pen.), (yellow card) 80'; Hylton (red card) 70'; McCormack (yellow card) 90+3' | Stadium: Stadium of Light; Attendance: 37,791; Referee: Lee Probert |

| 19 January 2019 27 | Scunthorpe United | 1–1 | Sunderland | Scunthorpe |
| 15:00 GMT | Hammill 87' | Report | Maja 59' | Stadium: Glanford Park; Attendance: 7,263 (2,749 away); Referee: Craig Hicks |

| 2 February 2019 28 | Sunderland | 1–0 | AFC Wimbledon | Sunderland |
| 15:00 BST | McGeady 67'; Leadbitter (yellow card) 76' | Report | Oshilaja (yellow card) 36'; Seddon (yellow card) 68'; Wordsworth (yellow card) 69' | Stadium: Stadium of Light; Attendance: 30,424; Referee: Ben Toner |

| 9 February 2019 29 | Oxford United | 1–1 | Sunderland | Oxford |
| 15:00 GMT | Mackie (yellow card) 27'; Mousinho (yellow card) 39'; Browne 87' | Report | Dunne 34'; James (yellow card) 62'; Gooch (yellow card) 76'; O'Nien (yellow card) 90+7' | Stadium: Kassam Stadium; Attendance: 10,383 (1,800 away); Referee: Scott Oldham |

| 12 February 2019 30 | Sunderland | 1–1 | Blackpool | Sunderland |
| 19:45 BST | Baldwin 75' | Report | Gnanduillet 31'; Thompson (yellow card) 80' | Stadium: Stadium of Light; Attendance: 27,580; Referee: Carl Boyeson |

| 15 February 2019 31 | Sunderland | 2–2 | Accrington Stanley | Sunderland |
| 19:45 BST | Baldwin (yellow card) 35'; Honeyman 55'; McGeady 62' | Report | Kee 30' (pen.); Conneely (yellow card) 42'; Smyth 52' | Stadium: Stadium of Light; Attendance: 28,937; Referee: Darren Drysdale |

| 19 February 2019 32 | Sunderland | 4–2 | Gillingham | Sunderland |
| 19:45 BST | Cattermole 4'; Flanagan 10'; Honeyman (yellow card) 54'; Grigg 66' (pen.); Dunne (yellow card) 68'; McGeady 77' (pen.) | Report | Eaves 6'; Burke (yellow card) 34'; Hanlan 40'; Byrne (yellow card) 59'; Lopes (yellow card) 65' | Stadium: Stadium of Light; Attendance: 28,364; Referee: Matthew Donohue |

| 23 February 2019 33 | Bristol Rovers | 0–2 | Sunderland | Horfield |
| 15:00 GMT | | Report | O'Nien (yellow card) 23' (goal) 25'; James (yellow card) 49'; McGeady 55'; Dunne (yellow card) 70' | Stadium: Memorial Stadium; Attendance: 10,009 (1,800 away); Referee: James Linington |

| 2 March 2019 34 | Sunderland | 2–0 | Plymouth Argyle | Sunderland |
| 15:00 BST | Cattermole 32'; Dunne (yellow card) 50'; Honeyman 87' | Report | Canavan (yellow card) 90+3' | Stadium: Stadium of Light; Attendance: 32,360; Referee: Graham Salisbury |

| 9 March 2019 35 | Wycombe Wanderers | 1–1 | Sunderland | High Wycombe |
| 15:00 GMT | Samuel (yellow card) 11', (goal) 35'; Bean (yellow card) 55' (yellow-red card) 90+13'; Tyson (red card) 90+8' | Report | Cattermole (yellow card) 47'; McGeady (yellow card) 79'; Flanagan (yellow card) 86'; Watmore 90+4'; Honeyman (red card) 90+8' | Stadium: Adams Park; Attendance: 8,422 (3,800 away); Referee: Lee Swabey |

| 12 March 2019 36 | Barnsley | 0–0 | Sunderland | Barnsley |
| 18:45 GMT | Pinnock (yellow card) 63' | Report | Leadbitter (yellow card) 21'; Power (yellow card) 88' | Stadium: Oakwell; Attendance: 18,282 (5,000 away); Referee: Peter Bankes |

| 16 March 2019 37 | Sunderland | 2–1 | Walsall | Sunderland |
| 15:00 BST | Cattermole 33', (yellow card) 49'; Leadbitter (yellow card) 35'; Grigg 71'; Gooch (yellow card) 90+5' | Report | Gordon 4', (yellow card) 56'; Guthrie (yellow card) 38' | Stadium: Stadium of Light; Attendance: 34,647; Referee: Alan Young |

| 3 April 2019 38 | Accrington Stanley | 0–3 | Sunderland | Accrington |
| 19:45 BST | Richards-Everton (yellow card) 15'; Finley (yellow card) 32'; Hughes (yellow card) 75'; Kee (yellow card) 86' | Report | McGeady 4'; O'Nien (yellow card) 30'; Grigg 45+3'; Wyke (yellow card) 63'; Sterling 79' | Stadium: Crown Ground; Attendance: 3,802 (2,000 away); Referee: John Brooks |

| 6 April 2019 39 | Rochdale | 1–2 | Sunderland | Rochdale |
| 15:00 BST | Henderson 28'; Bunney (yellow card) 50'; Williams (yellow card) 85' | Report | Hume (yellow card) 16'; McGeouch (yellow card) 53'; Wyke 56'; Honeyman 89' | Stadium: Spotland Stadium; Attendance: 6,546 (4,164 away); Referee: Carl Boyeson |

| 9 April 2019 40 | Sunderland | 1–1 | Burton Albion | Sunderland |
| 19:45 BST | Baldwin 27' | Report | Flanagan 19' (o.g.); Fox (yellow card) 86' | Stadium: Stadium of Light; Attendance: 29,513; Referee: Scott Oldham |

| 13 April 2019 41 | Sunderland | 4–5 | Coventry City | Sunderland |
| 15:00 BST | Honeyman 15'; Wyke 41'; Leadbitter (yellow card) 44'; Grigg 45+4'; Power 69' | Report | Enobakhare 12'; Bakayoko 18'; Hiwula 25'; Sterling (yellow card) 42'; Shipley 55'; Chaplin 78', (yellow card) 79' | Stadium: Stadium of Light; Attendance: 36,134; Referee: John Busby |

| 19 April 2019 42 | Sunderland | 2–0 | Doncaster Rovers | Sunderland |
| 17:15 BST | Morgan 7'; Wyke 32'; Cattermole (yellow card) 67' | Report | Andrew (yellow card) 87' | Stadium: Stadium of Light; Attendance: 34,287; Referee: Andy Woolmer |

| 22 April 2019 43 | Peterborough United | 1–1 | Sunderland | Peterborough |
| 15:00 BST | Lafferty (yellow card) 33'; Maddison (yellow card) 48'; Godden 90+1' | Report | Oviedo (yellow card) 2'; O'Nien (yellow card) 77'; Power 87' | Stadium: London Road Stadium; Attendance: 11,277 (4,500 away); Referee: Antony Coggins |

| 27 April 2019 44 | Sunderland | 1–1 | Portsmouth | Sunderland |
| 15:00 BST | McGeady (yellow card) 7'; Flanagan 9'; Honeyman (yellow card) 13'; Power (yellow card) 87' | Report | Thompson (yellow card) 16'; Lowe 24'; Close (yellow card) 45+1'; Pitman (yellow card) 71' | Stadium: Stadium of Light; Attendance: 41,129; Referee: Craig Pawson |

| 30 April 2019 45 | Fleetwood Town | 2–1 | Sunderland | Fleetwood |
| 19:45 BST | Burns (yellow card) 71'; Madden 73'; Sowerby (yellow card) 83'; Hunter (yellow card) 83'; Wallace (yellow card) 90+2'; Eastham 90+5' | Report | Cattermole 29' | Stadium: Highbury Stadium; Attendance: 4,011 (1,100 away); Referee: Robert Jones |

| 4 May 2019 46 | Southend United | 2–1 | Sunderland | Southend-on-Sea |
| 17:30 BST | Kiernan (yellow card) 41'; White 43'; Humphrys 87' (yellow card) 88' | Report | Wyke (yellow card) 39'; Maguire 75' (pen.) | Stadium: Roots Hall; Attendance: 10,779 (2,400 away); Referee: Darren Bond |

=== League One play-offs ===
| 11 May 2019 Semi-final first leg | Sunderland | 1–0 | Portsmouth | Sunderland |
| 19:30 BST | Maguire 62'; Honeyman (yellow card) 82' Ozturk (red card) 68' | Report | | Stadium: Stadium of Light; Attendance: 26,610; Referee: Andy Woolmer |

| 16 May 2019 Semi-final second leg | Portsmouth | 0–0 (0–1 agg.) | Sunderland | Portsmouth |
| 19:45 BST | Evans (yellow card) 4'; Naylor (yellow card) 11'; Pitman (yellow card) 45+3'; Vaughan (yellow card) 79' | Report | Maguire (yellow card) 21'; O'Nien (yellow card) 75' | Stadium: Fratton Park; Attendance: 18,077 (2,174 away); Referee: Peter Bankes |

| 26 May 2019 Final | Charlton Athletic | 2–1 | Sunderland | Wembley |
| 15:00 BST | Purrington 35'; Sarr (yellow card) 44'; Bauer 90+4' | Report | Sarr 5' (o.g.); Grigg (yellow card) 65'; O'Nien (yellow card) 73'; Leadbitter (yellow card) 83'; Flanagan (yellow card) 90+2' | Stadium: Wembley Stadium; Attendance: 76,155; Referee: Andrew Madley |

=== FA Cup ===
On 22 October 2018, the draw for the first round was made in Hitchin. The draw for the second round was made live on BBC and BT by Mark Schwarzer and Glenn Murray on 12 November.

| 11 November 2018 First round | Port Vale | 1–2 | Sunderland | Burslem, Stoke-on-Trent |
| 14:30 GMT | Pope 35'; Joyce (yellow card) 67' | Report | Honeyman 1'; Gooch 19'; McGeady (yellow card) 49' | Stadium: Vale Park; Attendance: 7,238 (2,500 away); Referee: Anthony Backhouse |

| 1 December 2018 Second round | Walsall | 1–1 | Sunderland | Walsall |
| 15:00 GMT | Cook (yellow card) 34', (goal) 53' | Report | McGeady 37'; Matthews (yellow card) 49' | Stadium: Bescot Stadium; Attendance: 3,140 (1,800 away); Referee: Carl Boyeson |

| 11 December 2018 Replay | Sunderland | 0–1 | Walsall | Sunderland |
| 19:45 GMT | Maguire (yellow card) 11'; Watmore (yellow card) 37'; O'Nien (yellow card) 74' | Report | Kinsella 52'; Guthrie (yellow card) 76' | Stadium: Stadium of Light; Attendance: 8,212; Referee: Michael Salisbury |

=== EFL Cup ===
On 15 June 2018, the draw for the first round was made in Vietnam.

| 16 August 2018 First round | Sunderland | 0–2 | Sheffield Wednesday | Sunderland |
| 19:00 BST | Honeyman (yellow card) 35'; O'Nien (yellow card) 59' | Report | Matias 29'; Reach 79' | Stadium: Stadium of Light; Attendance: 13,890; Referee: Ben Toner |

=== EFL Trophy ===
On 13 July 2018, the initial group stage draw bar the U21 invited clubs was announced. The draw for the second round was made live on Talksport by Leon Britton and Steve Claridge on 16 November. On 8 December, the third round draw was drawn by Alan McInally and Matt Le Tissier on Soccer Saturday. The Quarter-final draw was made conducted on Sky Sports by Don Goodman and Thomas Frank on 10 January 2019. The draw for the semi-finals took place on 25 January live on Talksport.

==== Group A ====
| Pos | Lge | Team | Pld | W | PW | PL | L | GF | GA | GD | Pts | Qualification |
|---|---|---|---|---|---|---|---|---|---|---|---|---|
| 1 | L1 | Sunderland | 3 | 2 | 1 | 0 | 0 | 4 | 1 | +3 | 8 | Round 2 |
| 2 | ACA | Stoke City U21 | 3 | 1 | 1 | 1 | 0 | 3 | 2 | +1 | 6 | Round 2 |
| 3 | L2 | Carlisle United | 3 | 1 | 0 | 1 | 1 | 5 | 6 | −1 | 4 | |
| 4 | L2 | Morecambe | 3 | 0 | 0 | 0 | 3 | 3 | 6 | −3 | 0 | |

Source: EFL.com

| 4 September 2018 Group Game 1 | Sunderland | 0–0 (4–2 p) | Stoke City U21s | Sunderland |
| 19:45 BST | | Report | | Stadium: Stadium of Light; Attendance: 7,644; Referee: Martin Coy |
| | Penalties |
| | Sinclair (penalty scored); McGeouch (penalty scored); O'Nien (penalty scored); Hume (penalty scored) | | Campbell (penalty missed); Souttar (penalty missed); Sørensen (penalty scored); Szerető (penalty scored) |

| 9 October 2018 Group Game 2 | Sunderland | 3–1 | Carlisle United | Sunderland |
| 19:45 BST | Kimpioka 3'; Robson 34'; Honeyman 63'; O'Nien (yellow card) 72' | Report | Nadesan 22' | Stadium: Stadium of Light; Attendance: 8,112; Referee: Ben Toner |

| 13 November 2018 Group Game 3 | Morecambe | 0–1 | Sunderland | Morecambe |
| 19:45 GMT | Kenyon (yellow card) 35'; Cuvelier (yellow card) 45+2'; Thompson (yellow card) 54' | Report | Maja 90+1' | Stadium: Globe Arena; Attendance: 2,377 (1,800 away); Referee: Paul Marsden |

==== Knockout stage ====
| 4 December 2018 Round 2 | Sunderland | 2–0 | Notts County | Sunderland |
| 19:45 GMT | Mumba (yellow card) 28'; Jones 22' (o.g.); Sinclair 73' (pen.) | Report | Hewitt (yellow card) 29'; Duffy (yellow card) 76'; Vaughan (yellow card) 86' | Stadium: Stadium of Light; Attendance: 8,580; Referee: Graham Salisbury |

| 8 January 2019 Round 3 | Sunderland | 4–0 | Newcastle United U21s | Sunderland |
| 19:45 GMT | Mumba (yellow card) 42'; Watts 49' (o.g.); Wyke 52'; Maguire 78'; Kimpioka 86' | Report | Sangare (yellow card) 53' | Stadium: Stadium of Light; Attendance: 16,654; Referee: Tony Harrington |

| 22 January 2019 Quarter-finals | Sunderland | 2–0 | Manchester City U21s | Sunderland |
| 19:45 GMT | Cattermole (yellow card) 17'; Watmore 22'; Gooch 65' | Report | Ogbeta (yellow card) 31'; Pozo (yellow card) 90'; Braaf (yellow card) 90+2' | Stadium: Stadium of Light; Attendance: 14,679; Referee: Michael Salisbury |

| 5 March 2019 Semi-finals | Bristol Rovers | 0–2 | Sunderland | Bristol |
| 19:45 GMT | Nichols (yellow card) 38'; Craig (yellow card) 86' | Report | Grigg 44'; Morgan 47' | Stadium: Memorial Stadium; Attendance: 6,699 (1,800 away); Referee: Michael Salisbury |

| 31 March 2019 Final | Portsmouth | 2–2 (a.e.t.) (5–4 p) | Sunderland | London |
| 14:30 GMT | Curtis (yellow card) 32'; Thompson 82'; Evans (yellow card) 101'; Lowe 114' (yellow card) 116' | Report | McGeady 38', 119' (yellow card) 90'; Baldwin (yellow card) 80' | Stadium: Wembley Stadium; Attendance: 85,021; Referee: Dean Whitestone |
| | Penalties |
| | Evans (penalty scored); Pitman (penalty scored); Brown (penalty scored); Lowe (penalty scored); Hawkins (penalty scored) | | McGeady (penalty scored); Cattermole (penalty missed); Gooch (penalty scored); Power (penalty scored); O'Nien (penalty scored) |

== Squad statistics ==
=== Top scorers ===
As of April 28, 2019

| Rnk | Pos | No. | Player | League One | FA Cup | EFL Cup | EFL Trophy | Total |
|---|---|---|---|---|---|---|---|---|
| 1 | FW | 20 | (England) Josh Maja | 15 | 0 | 0 | 1 | 16 |
| 2 | MF | 19 | (Republic of Ireland) Aiden McGeady | 11 | 1 | 0 | 2 | 14 |
| 3 | MF | 10 | (England) George Honeyman | 6 | 1 | 0 | 1 | 8 |
| 4 | MF | 7 | (Scotland) Chris Maguire | 6 | 0 | 0 | 1 | 7 |
| 4 | MF | 11 | (United States) Lynden Gooch | 5 | 1 | 0 | 1 | 7 |
| 6 | MF | 6 | (England) Lee Cattermole | 6 | 0 | 0 | 0 | 6 |
| 7 | FW | 9 | (England) Charlie Wyke | 4 | 0 | 0 | 1 | 5 |
| 7 | MF | 13 | (England) Luke O'Nien | 5 | 0 | 0 | 0 | 5 |
| 7 | FW | 22 | (Northern Ireland) Will Grigg | 4 | 0 | 0 | 1 | 5 |
| 10 | MF | 27 | (England) Max Power | 4 | 0 | 0 | 0 | 4 |
| 11 | DF | 15 | (England) Jack Baldwin | 3 | 0 | 0 | 0 | 3 |
| 12 | DF | 12 | (Northern Ireland) Tom Flanagan | 2 | 0 | 0 | 0 | 2 |
| 12 | MF | 14 | (England) Duncan Watmore | 1 | 0 | 0 | 1 | 2 |
| 12 | MF | 17 | (Scotland) Lewis Morgan | 1 | 0 | 0 | 1 | 2 |
| 12 | FW | 17 | (England) Jerome Sinclair | 1 | 0 | 0 | 1 | 2 |
| 12 | FW | 48 | (Sweden) Benjamin Mbunga-Kimpioka | 0 | 0 | 0 | 2 | 2 |
| 16 | DF | 2 | (Wales) Adam Matthews | 1 | 0 | 0 | 0 | 1 |
| 16 | MF | 21 | (England) Ethan Robson | 0 | 0 | 0 | 1 | 1 |
| 16 | FW | 26 | (England) Kazaiah Sterling | 1 | 0 | 0 | 0 | 1 |
| 16 | DF | 30 | (Republic of Ireland) Jimmy Dunne | 1 | 0 | 0 | 0 | 1 |
| Own Goals | | | | 1 | 0 | 0 | 2 | 3 |
| Total | | | | 74 | 3 | 0 | 15 | 92 |

=== Appearances and goals ===
As of 28 April 2019

| No. | Pos | Nat | Player | Total | | League One | | FA Cup | | EFL Cup | | EFL Trophy | |
| No. | Pos | Nat | Player | Apps | Goals | Apps | Goals | Apps | Goals | Apps | Goals | Apps | Goals |
|---|---|---|---|---|---|---|---|---|---|---|---|---|---|
| 1 | GK | (Scotland) SCO | Jon McLaughlin | 52 | 0 | 46 | 0 | 3 | 0 | 1 | 0 | 2 | 0 |
| 2 | DF | (Wales) WAL | Adam Matthews | 27 | 1 | 19+3 | 1 | 2 | 0 | 0 | 0 | 3 | 0 |
| 3 | DF | (Costa Rica) CRC | Bryan Oviedo | 27 | 0 | 14+8 | 0 | 2 | 0 | 0 | 0 | 3 | 0 |
| 4 | DF | (Netherlands) NED | Glenn Loovens | 13 | 0 | 11 | 0 | 0 | 0 | 0 | 0 | 2 | 0 |
| 5 | DF | (Turkey) TUR | Alim Öztürk | 15 | 0 | 5+3 | 0 | 0 | 0 | 1 | 0 | 6 | 0 |
| 6 | MF | (England) ENG | Lee Cattermole | 32 | 6 | 27+1 | 6 | 0+1 | 0 | 1 | 0 | 2 | 0 |
| 7 | MF | (Scotland) SCO | Chris Maguire | 38 | 7 | 22+9 | 6 | 2 | 0 | 1 | 0 | 4 | 1 |
| 8 | MF | (Scotland) SCO | Dylan McGeouch | 29 | 0 | 14+7 | 0 | 2 | 0 | 0 | 0 | 5+1 | 0 |
| 9 | FW | (England) ENG | Charlie Wyke | 26 | 5 | 13+10 | 4 | 0 | 0 | 0 | 0 | 2+1 | 1 |
| 10 | MF | (England) ENG | George Honeyman | 40 | 8 | 31+3 | 6 | 2 | 1 | 1 | 0 | 3 | 1 |
| 11 | MF | (United States) USA | Lynden Gooch | 43 | 7 | 29+8 | 5 | 2 | 1 | 0+1 | 0 | 0+3 | 1 |
| 12 | DF | (Northern Ireland) NIR | Tom Flanagan | 37 | 2 | 28+2 | 2 | 3 | 0 | 0 | 0 | 4 | 0 |
| 13 | MF | (England) ENG | Luke O'Nien | 47 | 5 | 23+12 | 5 | 2+1 | 0 | 1 | 0 | 7+1 | 0 |
| 14 | MF | (England) ENG | Duncan Watmore | 16 | 2 | 3+8 | 1 | 1 | 0 | 0 | 0 | 3+1 | 1 |
| 15 | DF | (England) ENG | Jack Baldwin | 41 | 3 | 34 | 3 | 3 | 0 | 1 | 0 | 3 | 0 |
| 16 | DF | (England) ENG | Reece James | 34 | 0 | 23+4 | 0 | 2 | 0 | 1 | 0 | 4 | 0 |
| 17 | MF | (Scotland) SCO | Lewis Morgan | 18 | 2 | 11+5 | 1 | 0 | 0 | 0 | 0 | 2 | 1 |
| 18 | DF | (Scotland) SCO | Donald Love | 4 | 0 | 4 | 0 | 0 | 0 | 0 | 0 | 0 | 0 |
| 19 | MF | (Republic of Ireland) IRL | Aiden McGeady | 39 | 14 | 29+5 | 11 | 2 | 1 | 0 | 0 | 3 | 2 |
| 22 | FW | (Northern Ireland) NIR | Will Grigg | 18 | 5 | 13+3 | 4 | 0 | 0 | 0 | 0 | 2 | 1 |
| 23 | MF | (England) ENG | Grant Leadbitter | 16 | 0 | 12+2 | 0 | 0 | 0 | 0 | 0 | 2 | 0 |
| 24 | DF | (England) ENG | Jack Bainbridge | 2 | 0 | 0 | 0 | 0 | 0 | 0 | 0 | 2 | 0 |
| 25 | GK | (Netherlands) NED | Robbin Ruiter | 7 | 0 | 0+1 | 0 | 0 | 0 | 0 | 0 | 6 | 0 |
| 26 | FW | (England) ENG | Kazaiah Sterling | 6 | 1 | 0+6 | 1 | 0 | 0 | 0 | 0 | 0 | 0 |
| 27 | MF | (England) ENG | Max Power | 41 | 4 | 27+6 | 4 | 2+1 | 0 | 1 | 0 | 3+1 | 0 |
| 30 | DF | (Republic of Ireland) IRL | Jimmy Dunne | 13 | 1 | 12 | 1 | 0 | 0 | 0 | 0 | 1 | 0 |
| 33 | DF | (England) ENG | Denver Hume | 10 | 0 | 5+2 | 0 | 0 | 0 | 1 | 0 | 1+1 | 0 |
| 34 | MF | (England) ENG | Jake Hackett | 3 | 0 | 0 | 0 | 0 | 0 | 0 | 0 | 1+2 | 0 |
| 37 | MF | (England) ENG | Bali Mumba | 8 | 0 | 2+2 | 0 | 0+2 | 0 | 0 | 0 | 2 | 0 |
| 39 | FW | (England) ENG | Jack Diamond | 3 | 0 | 0 | 0 | 0 | 0 | 0 | 0 | 1+2 | 0 |
| 40 | DF | (England) ENG | Brandon Taylor | 1 | 0 | 0 | 0 | 0 | 0 | 0 | 0 | 0+1 | 0 |
| 41 | FW | (Scotland) SCO | Lee Connelly | 3 | 0 | 0 | 0 | 0 | 0 | 0 | 0 | 0+3 | 0 |
| 45 | MF | (England) ENG | Daniel Neil | 1 | 0 | 0 | 0 | 0 | 0 | 0 | 0 | 0+1 | 0 |
| 47 | MF | (England) ENG | Jordan Hunter | 1 | 0 | 0 | 0 | 0 | 0 | 0 | 0 | 1 | 0 |
| 48 | FW | (Sweden) SWE | Benjamin Mbunga-Kimpioka | 9 | 2 | 0+4 | 0 | 0 | 0 | 0 | 0 | 2+3 | 2 |
Players who have played for Sunderland this season but are currently out on loan:
| 21 | MF | (England) ENG | Ethan Robson | 3 | 1 | 0 | 0 | 0 | 0 | 0 | 0 | 2+1 | 1 |
| 29 | MF | (England) ENG | Elliot Embleton | 1 | 0 | 0 | 0 | 0 | 0 | 1 | 0 | 0 | 0 |
| 35 | MF | (England) ENG | Luke Molyneux | 5 | 0 | 0+2 | 0 | 0 | 0 | 0+1 | 0 | 0+2 | 0 |
Players who have played for Sunderland this season but have left the club:
| 17 | FW | (England) ENG | Jerome Sinclair | 19 | 2 | 7+6 | 1 | 2+1 | 0 | 0 | 0 | 2+1 | 1 |
| 20 | FW | (England) ENG | Josh Maja | 30 | 16 | 22+2 | 15 | 1+2 | 0 | 0+1 | 0 | 2 | 1 |

=== Disciplinary record ===
As of 28 April 2019

| No. | Pos. | Name | League One | | | FA Cup | | | EFL Cup | | | EFL Trophy | | | Total | | |
| No. | Pos. | Name | Yellow card | (yellow card) (yellow-red card) | Red card | Yellow card | (yellow card) (yellow-red card) | Red card | Yellow card | (yellow card) (yellow-red card) | Red card | Yellow card | (yellow card) (yellow-red card) | Red card | Yellow card | (yellow card) (yellow-red card) | Red card |
|---|---|---|---|---|---|---|---|---|---|---|---|---|---|---|---|---|---|
| 2 | DF | Adam Matthews | 4 | | | 1 | | | | | | | | | 5 | | |
| 3 | DF | Bryan Oviedo | 3 | | 1 | | | | | | | | | | 3 | | 1 |
| 4 | DF | Glenn Loovens | 1 | | 1 | | | | | | | | | | 1 | | 1 |
| 6 | MF | Lee Cattermole | 13 | | | | | | | | | | | | 13 | | |
| 7 | MF | Chris Maguire | 2 | | 1 | 1 | | | | | | | | | 3 | | 1 |
| 8 | MF | Dylan McGeouch | 3 | | | | | | | | | | | | 3 | | |
| 9 | FW | Charlie Wyke | 1 | | | | | | | | | | | | 1 | | |
| 10 | MF | George Honeyman | 7 | | 1 | | | | 1 | | | | | | 8 | | 1 |
| 11 | MF | Lynden Gooch | 8 | | | | | | | | | | | | 8 | | |
| 12 | DF | Tom Flanagan | 5 | | | | | | | | | | | | 5 | | |
| 13 | MF | Luke O'Nien | 5 | | | 1 | | | 1 | | | 1 | | | 8 | | |
| 14 | MF | Duncan Watmore | | | | 1 | | | | | | | | | 1 | | |
| 15 | DF | Jack Baldwin | 6 | | | | | | | | | 1 | | | 7 | | |
| 16 | DF | Reece James | 4 | | | | | | | | | | | | 4 | | |
| 18 | DF | Donald Love | 1 | | | | | | | | | | | | 1 | | |
| 19 | MF | Aiden McGeady | 2 | | | 1 | | | | | | 1 | | | 4 | | |
| 23 | MF | Grant Leadbitter | 4 | | | | | | | | | | | | 4 | | |
| 27 | MF | Max Power | 5 | | 3 | | | | | | | | | | 5 | | 3 |
| 30 | DF | Jimmy Dunne | 3 | | | | | | | | | | | | 3 | | |
| 33 | DF | Denver Hume | 2 | | | | | | | | | | | | 2 | | |
| 37 | MF | Bali Mumba | | | | | | | | | | 2 | | | 2 | | |
| Total | | | 83 | 0 | 7 | 5 | 0 | 0 | 2 | 0 | 0 | 5 | 0 | 0 | 94 | 0 | 7 |

== Transfers ==
=== Transfers in ===
| Date from | Position | Nationality | Name | From | Fee | Ref. |
|---|---|---|---|---|---|---|
| 1 July 2018 | CB | (Northern Ireland) | Tom Flanagan | Burton Albion | Free | |
| 1 July 2018 | RW | (Scotland) | Chris Maguire | Bury | Free | |
| 1 July 2018 | GK | (Scotland) | Jon McLaughlin | (Scotland) Heart of Midlothian | Free | |
| 1 July 2018 | CB | (Turkey) | Alim Öztürk | (Turkey) Boluspor | Free | |
| 2 July 2018 | LB | (England) | Reece James | Wigan Athletic | Free | |
| 2 July 2018 | AM | (Scotland) | Dylan McGeouch | (Scotland) Hibernian | Free | |
| 2 July 2018 | DM | (England) | Jordan Hunter | Liverpool | Free | |
| 11 July 2018 | CB | (England) | Jack Bainbridge | (Wales) Swansea City | Free | |
| 20 July 2018 | CB | (Netherlands) | Glenn Loovens | Sheffield Wednesday | Free | |
| 26 July 2018 | GK | (England) | Max Johnstone | Manchester United | Free | |
| 28 July 2018 | CB | (England) | Jack Baldwin | Peterborough United | £200,000 | |
| 30 July 2018 | CM | (England) | Luke O'Nien | Wycombe Wanderers | Undisclosed | |
| 1 August 2018 | ST | (England) | Charlie Wyke | Bradford City | £900,000 | |
| 2 January 2019 | CM | (England) | Max Power | Wigan Athletic | Undisclosed | |
| 29 January 2019 | CM | (England) | Grant Leadbitter | Middlesbrough | Free transfer | |
| 1 February 2019 | CF | (Northern Ireland) | Will Grigg | Wigan Athletic | £3,000,000 | |

=== Loans in ===
| Date from | Position | Nationality | Name | From | Until | Ref. |
|---|---|---|---|---|---|---|
| 25 July 2018 | ST | (England) | Jerome Sinclair | Watford | 10 January 2019 | |
| 10 August 2018 | CM | (England) | Max Power | Wigan Athletic | 1 January 2019 | |
| 9 January 2019 | CB | (Republic of Ireland) | Jimmy Dunne | Burnley | End of season | |
| 30 January 2019 | LW | (Scotland) | Lewis Morgan | (Scotland) Celtic | End of season | |
| 31 January 2019 | CF | (England) | Kazaiah Sterling | Tottenham Hotspur | End of season | |

=== Transfers out ===
| Date from | Position | Nationality | Name | To | Fee | Ref. |
|---|---|---|---|---|---|---|
| 1 July 2018 | CB | (Australia) | Tom Beadling | (Scotland) Dunfermline Athletic | Released | |
| 1 July 2018 | ST | (Italy) | Fabio Borini | (Italy) Milan | £5,500,000 | |
| 1 July 2018 | RB | (England) | Billy Jones | Rotherham United | Released | |
| 1 July 2018 | CB | (England) | Michael Ledger | (Norway) Notodden | Undisclosed | |
| 1 July 2018 | RW | (Netherlands) | Jeremain Lens | (Turkey) Beşiktaş | £6,000,000 | |
| 1 July 2018 | LW | (Democratic Republic of the Congo) | Kazenga LuaLua | Luton Town | Released | |
| 1 July 2018 | DM | (Northern Ireland) | Paddy McNair | Middlesbrough | £5,000,000 | |
| 1 July 2018 | CB | (Republic of Ireland) | John O'Shea | Reading | Released | |
| 1 July 2018 | ST | (Republic of Ireland) | Jean-Yves Poame | (Republic of Ireland) Cabinteely | Released | |
| 1 July 2018 | RB | (England) | Josh Robson | (Norway) Notodden | Released | |
| 1 July 2018 | CM | (England) | Jack Rodwell | Blackburn Rovers | Released | |
| 1 July 2018 | GK | (England) | Jason Steele | Brighton & Hove Albion | £1,500,000 | |
| 1 July 2018 | GK | (Republic of Ireland) | James Talbot | (Republic of Ireland) Bohemians F.C. | Released | |
| 1 July 2018 | CB | (Republic of Ireland) | Marc Wilson | Bolton Wanderers | Released | |
| 1 July 2018 | CM | (England) | Daniel Wright | South Shields | Released | |
| 1 July 2018 | DM | (England) | Jordan Hickey | Hull City | Released | |
| 11 July 2018 | ST | (England) | Sam Greenwood | Arsenal | Undisclosed | |
| 13 July 2018 | GK | (New Zealand) | Michael Woud | (Netherlands) Willem II | Undisclosed | |
| 14 July 2018 | ST | (Sweden) | Joel Asoro | (Wales) Swansea City | £2,500,000 | |
| 17 July 2018 | AM | (Tunisia) | Wahbi Khazri | (France) Saint-Étienne | £9,000,000 | |
| 20 July 2018 | RW | (England) | Callum McManaman | Wigan Athletic | Undisclosed | |
| 12 September 2018 | CB | (Senegal) | Papy Djilobodji | (France) Guingamp | Sacked | |
| 24 September 2018 | CM | (Gabon) | Didier Ndong | (France) Guingamp | Sacked | |
| 17 January 2019 | CF | (England) | Andrew Nelson | (Scotland) Dundee | Undisclosed | |
| 26 January 2019 | CF | (England) | Josh Maja | (France) Bordeaux | Undisclosed | |
| 29 January 2019 | CB | (New Zealand) | Sam Brotherton | (United States) North Carolina FC | Free | |
| 15 March 2019 | CB | (England) | Adam Bale | Hartlepool United | Free | |

=== Loans out ===
| Start date | Position | Nationality | Name | To | Until | Ref. |
|---|---|---|---|---|---|---|
| 1 August 2018 | CB | (Ivory Coast) | Lamine Koné | (France) Strasbourg | End of season | |
| 3 August 2018 | CB | (New Zealand) | Sam Brotherton | Blyth Spartans | 30 January 2019 | |
| 30 August 2018 | CM | (England) | Elliot Embleton | Grimsby Town | End of season | |
| 31 August 2018 | CF | (Scotland) | Connor Shields | (Scotland) Alloa Athletic | 1 January 2019 | |
| 14 January 2019 | CF | (Scotland) | Connor Shields | (Scotland) Alloa Athletic | End of season | |
| 7 September 2018 | AM | (England) | Luke Molyneux | Gateshead | 2 January 2019 | |
| 21 September 2018 | GK | (Poland) | Max Stryjek | Eastleigh | 22 December 2018 | |
| 6 December 2018 | LB | (France) | Williams Kokolo | Darlington | Work experience | |
| 13 December 2018 | CF | (England) | Andrew Nelson | Darlington | 10 January 2019 | |
| 18 January 2019 | AM | (England) | Luke Molyneux | Hartlepool United | End of season | |
| 31 January 2019 | CM | (England) | Ethan Robson | (Scotland) Dundee | End of season | |
| 22 March 2019 | CF | (England) | Jack Diamond | Spennymoor Town | End of season | |

== See also ==
- Sunderland 'Til I Die
