= List of Chester F.C. players (25–99 appearances) =

Chester Football Club is an association football club based in Chester, England. They are currently members of the National League North, the sixth tier of English football, and play at the Deva Stadium.

The club was founded in 2010 following the liquidation of Chester City. In its inaugural season it won the Division One North of the Northern Premier League, then won the Northern League Premier Division in 2011–12 and the Conference North in 2012–13. Chester returned to the National League North following relegation in 2017–18.

The club's first team have competed in numerous competitions, and all players who have played 25-99 first-team matches, either as a member of the starting eleven or as a substitute, are listed below. Each player's details include the duration of his Chester career, his typical playing position while with the club, and the number of matches played and goals scored in domestic league matches and in all senior competitive matches.

== Key ==
- The list is ordered first by number of appearances in total, then by number of league appearances, and then if necessary by date of debut.
- Statistics are correct up to and including the match played on 29 April 2026, the final match of Chester's 2025–26 season. Where a player left the club permanently after this date, his statistics are updated to his date of leaving.
- Players shown in bold are currently registered for the club.
- League appearances and goals comprise those in the Northern Premier League and the Football Conference/National League, excluding play-off games.
- Other appearances and goals comprise those in the FA Cup, FA Trophy, Cheshire Senior Cup, Northern Premier League League Cup and the league play-off games.

== Players with 25 to 99 appearances ==
Statistics are correct up to the end of the 2025–26 season. Please do not update current players stats until the seasons ends or player leaves the club.

Name	Nat.	Pos	Date of birth	Joined		Left		League appearances				Other appearances				Total appearances				Notes	Refs
Name	Nat.	Pos	Date of birth	Date	From	Date	To	Starts	Subs	Total	Goals	Starts	Subs	Total	Goals	Starts	Subs	Total	Goals	Notes	Refs
Kurt Willoughby	(England)	FW	1997-07-15	2022-07-12	York City	2023-06-07	Oldham Athletic	64	19	83	26	14	2	**16**	7	78	21	99	33		
Kurt Willoughby	(England)	FW	1997-07-15	2024-07-24	—	2025-05-25	—	64	19	83	26	14	2	**16**	7	78	21	99	33	on loan from Oldham Athletic	
George Waring	(England)	FW	1994-12-02	2019-01-25	Tranmere Rovers	2022-05-20	Curzon Ashton	34	44	78	13	9	8	**17**	4	43	52	95	17		
Charlie Caton	(Wales)	FW	2002-11-25	2022-11-18	Shrewsbury Town	2025-01-16	Accrington Stanley	63	16	79	26	9	5	**14**	3	72	21	93	29	on loan till 2023-05-27	
Johnny Hunt	(England)	DF	1990-08-23	2015-06-25	Cambridge United	2017-07-01	Mansfield Town	80	4	84	3	8	—	**8**	1	88	4	92	4		
Ben Heneghan	(England)	DF	1993-09-19	2014-08-15	Stoke City	2016-06-23	Motherwell	75	5	80	6	12	—	**12**	4	87	5	92	10		
Jon Worsnop	(England)	GK	1983-01-13	2014-07-01	Alfreton Town	2016-09-28	Bradford (Park Avenue)	80	—	80	—	11	—	**11**	—	91	—	91	—		
Michael Kay	(England)	DF	1989-12-09	2013-07-09	Tranmere Rovers	2015-12-04	retired	65	10	75	2	10	—	**10**	—	75	10	85	2		
Matty McGinn	(England)	DF	1983-06-27	2011-08-21	Southport	2013-05-17	AFC Telford United	65	6	71	21	13	1	**14**	1	78	7	85	22	on loan till 2011-09-20	
Ashley Williams	(Wales)	MF	1987-10-08	2011-01-12	Airbus UK Broughton	2014-01-17	Airbus UK Broughton	57	13	70	2	11	4	**15**	—	68	17	85	2		
Craig Hobson	(England)	FW	1988-02-25	2014-03-14	Guiseley	2016-06-05	Altrincham	40	32	72	10	9	1	**10**	4	49	33	82	14		
Gary Roberts	(England)	MF	1987-02-02	2018-01-09	Southport	2020-12-15	Congleton Town	66	4	70	6	11	1	**12**	1	77	5	82	7		
Joel Taylor	(England)	DF	1996-03-24	2019-05-24	Kidderminster Harriers	2020-12-07	Chesterfield	57	9	66	—	13	3	**16**	—	70	12	82	—		
Joel Taylor	(England)	DF	1996-03-24	2023-05-30	Wealdstone	2024-05-01	Hednesford Town	57	9	66	—	13	3	**16**	—	70	12	82	—		
Kingsley James	(England)	MF	1992-02-17	2014-06-10	Hereford United	2015-07-01	FC Halifax Town	69	3	72	4	9	—	**9**	1	78	3	81	5		
Kingsley James	(England)	MF	1992-02-17	2017-06-15	Macclesfield Town	2018-07-04	Guiseley	69	3	72	4	9	—	**9**	1	78	3	81	5		
Antoni Sarcevic	(England)	MF	1992-03-13	2010-10-22	—	2010-12-03	—	58	6	64	15	15	1	**16**	8	73	7	80	23	on loan from Crewe Alexandra	
Antoni Sarcevic	(England)	MF	1992-03-13	2011-11-23	Crewe Alexandra	2013-06-25	Fleetwood Town	58	6	64	15	15	1	**16**	8	73	7	80	23		
Ross Hannah	(England)	FW	1986-05-14	2015-06-04	Grimsby Town	2016-05-17	Barrow	61	12	73	32	6	—	**6**	1	67	12	79	36		
Ross Hannah	(England)	FW	1986-05-14	2017-05-31	Barrow	2018-07-04	Gainsborough Trinity	61	12	73	32	6	—	**6**	1	67	12	79	36		
Jordan Chapell	(England)	MF	1991-09-08	2015-07-03	Torquay United	2018-07-01	Matlock Town	43	26	69	5	7	2	**9**	3	50	28	78	8		
Robbie Booth	(England)	MF	1985-12-30	2010-09-10	Droylsden	2013-01-02	Bangor City	50	18	68	10	7	3	**10**	4	57	21	78	14		
Kane Richards	(England)	FW	1994-06-16	2014-12-17	Ilkeston	2017-07-01	Dover Athletic	42	27	69	13	6	2	**8**	1	48	29	77	14		
Wes Baynes	(England)	DF	1988-10-12	2011-06-18	Wrexham	2013-05-18	AFC Telford United	49	13	62	8	12	2	**14**	1	61	15	76	9		
Matty Hughes	(England)	MF	1992-07-17	2014-10-06	—	2014-12-03	—	47	19	66	11	5	3	**8**	2	52	22	74	13	on loan from Fleetwood Town	
Matty Hughes	(England)	MF	1992-07-17	2015-01-16	—	2015-07-01	—	47	19	66	11	5	3	**8**	2	52	22	74	13	on loan from Fleetwood Town	
Matty Hughes	(England)	MF	1992-07-17	2018-05-31	Chorley	2021-05-08	Stalybridge Celtic	47	19	66	11	5	3	**8**	2	52	22	74	13		
**Jack Bainbridge**	(England)	MF	1998-05-27	2024-05-29	Southport			55	5	60	5	14	—	**14**	2	69	5	74	7		
Michael Wilde	(England)	FW	1983-08-27	2010-07-08	Fleetwood Town	2012-06-09	The New Saints	53	13	66	41	2	5	**7**	5	55	18	73	46		
Matty Waters	(England)	DF	1998-01-07	2015-07-01	youth team	2020-07-01	Curzon Ashton	31	26	57	5	15	1	**16**	2	46	27	73	7		
Matty Waters	(England)	DF	1998-01-07	2021-03-07	Curzon Ashton	2023-07-02	Connah's Quay Nomads	31	26	57	5	15	1	**16**	2	46	27	73	7	on loan till 2022-07-01	
Dylan Mottley-Henry	(England)	MF	1997-08-02	2024-10-10	Buxton	2026-05-20	Hednesford Town	36	25	61	14	5	5	**10**	3	41	30	71	17		
Bradley Jackson	(England)	MF	1996-10-20	2018-12-21	Ashton United	2021-05-16	Altrincham	54	6	60	4	11	—	**11**	1	65	6	71	5		
Ryan Lloyd	(England)	MF	1994-02-01	2015-11-24	—	2017-07-01	—	60	3	63	3	5	3	**8**	—	65	6	71	3	on loan from Port Vale	
Ryan Higgins	(England)	DF	1994-05-01	2015-01-02	AFC Telford United	2016-07-01	Southport	58	3	61	3	7	—	**7**	—	65	3	68	3		
Chris Simm	(England)	FW	1984-04-10	2011-01-12	Southport	2012-05-23	Bangor City	42	19	61	25	5	2	**7**	—	47	21	68	25		
Paul Linwood	(England)	DF	1983-10-24	2012-05-31	Fleetwood Town	2014-07-01	Salford City	52	6	58	2	8	—	**8**	—	60	6	66	2		
Kieran Coates	(England)	DF	2001-10-09	2022-08-11	Stoke City	2024-05-01	Boston United	48	8	56	—	6	4	**10**	—	54	12	66	—		
Sam Hughes	(England)	DF	1997-04-15	2015-07-01	youth team	2017-06-11	Leicester City	43	12	55	5	6	3	**9**	3	49	15	64	8		
Wyll Stanway	(England)	GK	2001-05-21	2022-01-28	Lancaster City	2024-05-23	Barrow	57	—	57	—	6	—	**6**	—	63	—	63	—		
James Alabi	(England)	FW	1994-11-08	2016-01-29	Ipswich Town	2017-07-10	Tranmere Rovers	53	5	58	23	4	—	**4**	1	57	5	62	24		
**Connor Woods**	(England)	MF	1998-02-01	2025-01-13	Warrington Town			34	19	53	9	7	2	**9**	3	41	21	62	12		
Michael Taylor	(England)	DF	1982-11-21	2010-12-28	Hyde	2012-11-02	AFC Fylde	49	4	53	2	9	—	**9**	—	58	4	62	2		
Louis Gray	(Wales)	GK	1995-08-11	2020-02-28	Carlisle United	2022-05-20	Nantwich Town	50	—	50	—	12	—	**12**	—	62	—	62	—	on loan till 2020-07-01	
Jamie Morgan	(England)	DF	1997-11-08	2019-06-05	Nantwich Town	2022-01-03	Altrincham	38	9	47	3	14	—	**14**	1	52	9	61	4		
Jamie Morgan	(England)	DF	1997-11-08	2022-06-18	Altrincham	2023-05-26	Radcliffe	38	9	47	3	14	—	**14**	1	52	9	61	4		
James Akintunde	(England)	FW	1996-03-29	2016-07-28	Cambridge United	2018-06-20	Maidenhead United	39	18	57	11	2	1	**3**	—	41	19	60	11		
Dan Mooney	(Wales)	MF	1999-07-03	2018-07-06	—	2019-04-15	—	38	14	52	9	4	4	**8**	2	42	18	60	11	on loan from Fleetwood Town	
Dan Mooney	(Wales)	MF	1999-07-03	2025-01-21	Boston United	2025-06-05	Kidderminster Harriers	38	14	52	9	4	4	**8**	2	42	18	60	11		
Marc Williams	(Wales)	FW	1988-07-27	2012-02-21	Kidderminster Harriers	2013-09-07	Northwich Victoria	29	21	50	10	9	1	**10**	4	38	22	60	14		
Darren Stephenson	(Jamaica)	FW	1993-03-06	2021-06-22	Curzon Ashton	2023-05-25	Farsley Celtic	28	21	49	9	5	4	**9**	—	33	25	58	9		
Adam Thomas	(England)	FW	1994-02-04	2022-05-13	Curzon Ashton	2024-05-01	Marine	22	27	49	10	6	3	**9**	—	28	30	58	10		
Michael Powell	(England)	MF	1985-09-11	2011-03-29	Southport	2013-02-11	Witton Albion	36	13	49	13	7	1	**8**	1	43	14	57	14		
Lewis Turner	(England)	DF	1992-09-03	2013-01-18	—	2014-06-23	—	49	1	50	3	5	—	**5**	—	54	1	55	3	on loan from Leeds United	
Elliott Whitehouse	(England)	MF	1993-10-27	2023-03-23	Scunthorpe United	2024-05-27	Macclesfield	47	1	48	12	7	—	**7**	1	54	1	55	13	on loan till 2023-06-05	
Liam Edwards	(England)	DF	1996-10-02	2022-06-09	Bolton Wanderers	2024-05-01	Leek Town	45	2	47	1	6	2	**8**	—	51	4	55	1		
Harry Tyrer	(England)	GK	2001-12-06	2022-07-08	—	2023-07-01	—	46	—	46	—	9	—	**9**	—	55	—	55	—	on loan from Everton	
Luke George	(England)	MF	1992-09-01	2015-06-29	Southport	2017-06-09	Hartlepool United	42	5	47	2	6	1	**7**	—	48	6	54	3		
Gary Stopforth	(England)	MF	1986-06-08	2018-07-03	Colne	2020-08-05	Clitheroe	38	5	43	1	9	—	**9**	—	47	5	52	1		
Tom Leak	(England)	DF	2000-10-31	2025-02-14	Boston United	2026-05-08	Kettering Town	34	8	42	1	9	—	**9**	—	43	8	51	1	on loan till 2025-05-29	
Ollie Heywood	(England)	MF	2003-09-19	2021-07-01	youth team	2025-05-25	Leek Town	32	15	47	1	4	—	**4**	—	36	15	51	1		
Elliott Durrell	(England)	MF	1989-07-31	2016-06-28	Tamworth	2017-07-01	Macclesfield Town	42	4	46	8	3	1	**4**	1	45	5	50	9		
Lucas Dawson	(England)	MF	1993-11-12	2017-03-02	AFC Telford United	2018-07-01	retired	38	8	46	4	4	—	**4**	1	42	8	50	5		
Nathan Jarman	(England)	FW	1986-09-19	2012-05-25	Alfreton Town	2013-06-14	North Ferriby United	34	8	42	14	6	2	**8**	3	40	10	50	17		
Greg Stones	(England)	DF	1982-05-04	2010-05-29	Rhyl	2011-09-23	United of Manchester	36	7	43	—	6	—	**6**	1	42	7	49	1		
Kole Hall	(Bermuda)	FW	1998-08-22	2022-06-01	Altrincham	2024-05-01	Chorley	31	9	40	5	3	5	**8**	3	34	14	48	8		
Nathan Turner	(England)	DF	1992-09-03	2012-11-22	—	2014-07-01	—	33	12	45	1	2	—	**2**	—	35	12	47	1	on loan from Leeds United	
Grant Shenton	(England)	GK	1991-01-28	2018-07-01	Trafford	2019-07-01	Buxton	42	—	42	—	5	—	**5**	—	47	—	47	—		
Gareth Roberts	(Wales)	MF	1978-02-06	2014-07-11	Notts County	2015-05-31	Stockport County	40	2	42	—	5	—	**5**	—	45	2	47	—		
Bradley Barnes	(England)	MF	1988-12-12	2010-07-01	Southport	2011-09-28	Colwyn Bay	33	9	42	9	4	1	**5**	—	37	10	47	9		
Sean McConville	(England)	MF	1989-03-06	2014-05-15	Stalybridge Celtic	2015-06-25	Accrington Stanley	35	6	41	9	6	—	**6**	2	41	6	47	11		
Dave Hankin	(England)	MF	1985-03-25	2012-05-23	Kidderminster Harriers	2013-06-14	AFC Fylde	29	8	37	4	9	1	**10**	—	38	9	47	4		
Danny Elliott	(England)	FW	1995-09-29	2019-07-12	Port Vale	2021-04-12	Hartlepool United	18	16	34	11	10	2	**12**	7	28	18	46	18		
Alex Lynch	(Wales)	GK	1995-04-04	2016-10-13	Bala Town	2018-01-26	Llandudno	41	—	41	—	4	—	**4**	—	45	—	45	—		
Wade Joyce	(England)	MF	1994-05-01	2016-07-28	Stockport County	2018-03-01	Skelmersdale United	17	24	41	—	3	1	**4**	—	20	25	45	—		
Finley Shrimpton	(England)	DF	2002-08-24	2025-06-20	Scunthorpe United	2026-05-08	Macclesfield Town	30	8	38	9	3	3	**6**	1	33	11	44	10		
Connell Rawlinson	(Wales)	DF	1991-09-22	2024-07-02	Notts County	2026-05-08	retired	39	1	40	2	3	—	**3**	1	42	1	43	3		
Steve Howson	(England)	DF	1985-09-29	2018-06-05	Southport	2019-07-01	retired	36	1	37	2	6	—	**6**	—	42	1	43	2		
Kieran Charnock	(England)	DF	1984-08-03	2014-06-04	Stockport County	2015-07-01	Chorley	33	4	37	1	6	—	**6**	—	39	4	43	1		
Andy Halls	(England)	DF	1992-04-20	2017-05-30	Macclesfield Town	2018-07-01	Guiseley	39	—	39	—	2	1	**3**	—	41	1	42	—		
Akwasi Asante	(Netherlands)	FW	1992-09-06	2018-11-30	Tamworth	2020-06-05	Gloucester City	31	5	36	27	3	2	**5**	1	34	7	41	28	on loan till 2019-01-03	
Scott Burton	(England)	MF	1987-10-21	2018-07-01	Salford City	2020-08-05	Bamber Bridge	28	6	34	—	6	1	**7**	—	34	7	41	—		
Pat Jones	(Wales)	DF	2003-06-09	2025-08-19	Exeter City	2026-03-10	Scunthorpe United	29	4	33	7	6	—	**6**	—	35	4	39	4		
Alex Brown	(England)	MF	1984-11-28	2011-05-25	Droylsden	2012-05-29	Hyde United	31	2	33	3	3	3	**6**	—	34	5	39	3		
Ian Sharps	(England)	DF	1980-10-23	2015-07-01	Burton Albion	2016-07-01	retired	32	—	32	—	6	1	**7**	—	38	1	39	—		
Russell Griffiths	(England)	GK	1996-04-13	2019-07-01	AFC Fylde	2020-07-01	AFC Telford United	31	—	31	—	8	—	**8**	—	39	—	39	—		
Matty McNeil	(England)	FW	1976-07-14	2011-06-03	Southport	2012-07-01	retired	31	1	32	9	6	—	**6**	3	37	1	38	12		
Christian Smith	(England)	DF	1987-12-10	2011-08-11	Wrexham	2012-07-01	Nantwich Town	29	2	31	6	7	—	**7**	—	36	2	38	6		
Jamie Menagh	(England)	MF	1993-09-14	2013-11-01	Prescot Cables	2015-07-01	Witton Albion	14	17	31	4	2	5	**7**	—	16	22	38	4		
Gareth Seddon	(England)	FW	1980-05-23	2013-07-01	FC Halifax Town	2014-07-01	Salford City	25	10	35	7	2	—	**2**	1	27	10	37	8		
Carl Ruffer	(England)	DF	1974-12-20	2010-06-08	Witton Albion	2011-07-01	retired	32	—	32	3	5	—	**5**	—	37	—	37	3		
Dominic Collins	(England)	DF	1991-04-15	2012-05-30	Northwich Victoria	2013-05-15	Hereford United	20	6	26	1	8	3	**11**	1	28	9	37	2		
John Johnston	(England)	MF	1994-09-28	2020-01-24	Altrincham	2021-10-01	Guiseley	26	5	31	3	3	2	**5**	—	29	7	36	3		
Matty Brown	(England)	DF	1990-03-15	2014-02-07	Chesterfield	2015-07-01	FC Halifax Town	28	2	30	3	5	1	**6**	—	33	3	36	3	on loan till 2014-06-20	
Kyle Wilson	(England)	FW	1985-11-14	2010-10-01	Hyde United	2011-05-25	Bangor City	10	19	29	3	7	—	**7**	3	17	19	36	6		
Fin Roberts	(England)	FW	2006-04-19	2025-01-21	—	2025-02-18	—	16	16	32	4	1	2	**3**	—	17	18	35	4	on loan from Crewe Alexandra	
Fin Roberts	(England)	FW	2006-04-19	2025-07-30	—	2026-05-25	—	16	16	32	4	1	2	**3**	—	17	18	35	4	on loan from Crewe Alexandra	
Blaine Hudson	(England)	DF	1991-10-28	2016-06-22	Wrexham	2017-07-01	The New Saints	30	2	32	2	3	—	**3**	—	33	2	35	2		
Kevin McIntyre	(England)	MF	1977-12-23	2013-05-22	Rochdale	2014-07-23	Connah's Quay Nomads	30	2	32	—	3	—	**3**	—	33	2	35	—		
Liam Brownhill	(England)	DF	1986-11-28	2011-05-15	Droylsden	2012-07-01	Bangor City	27	2	29	1	6	—	**6**	—	33	2	35	1		
Chris Williams	(Wales)	DF	1988-06-11	2010-07-01	Llangefni Town	2011-07-28	?	25	3	28	—	4	3	**7**	—	29	6	35	—		
James Jones	(England)	DF	1999-02-16	2016-07-01	youth team	2018-07-01	Salford City	24	2	26	4	6	2	**8**	1	30	4	34	5		
James Jones	(England)	DF	1999-02-16	2019-07-01	—	2020-07-01	—	24	2	26	4	6	2	**8**	1	30	4	34	5	on loan from Salford City	
Harry White	(England)	FW	1994-12-18	2017-05-02	Solihull Moors	2018-06-20	Hereford	20	10	30	5	3	—	**3**	1	23	10	33	6		
Danny Williams	(England)	MF	1988-01-25	2012-10-26	—	2013-07-01	—	28	—	28	2	5	—	**5**	—	33	—	33	2	on loan from Kendal Town	
Tony Gray	(England)	FW	1984-04-06	2012-09-25	Southport	2013-05-27	AFC Telford United	14	11	25	11	5	3	**8**	3	19	14	33	14		
Ben Mills	(England)	FW	1989-03-23	2012-08-17	—	2012-09-17	—	19	13	32	13	—	—	—	—	19	13	32	13	on loan from Macclesfield Town	
Ben Mills	(England)	FW	1989-03-23	2012-11-23	Macclesfield Town	2013-10-28	Brackley Town	19	13	32	13	—	—	—	—	19	13	32	13		
Theo Vassell	(England)	DF	1997-01-02	2016-07-07	—	2017-07-01	—	26	5	31	1	1	—	**1**	—	27	5	32	1	on loan from Walsall	
Jason Jarrett	(England)	MF	1979-09-14	2013-05-22	Airbus UK Broughton	2014-07-01	Salford City	27	2	29	—	2	1	**3**	—	29	3	32	—		
Lathaniel Rowe-Turner	(England)	DF	1989-11-12	2017-06-12	Barrow	2018-07-01	Stockport County	26	3	29	—	2	1	**3**	—	28	4	32	—		
Lewis Leigh	(England)	DF	2003-12-05	2025-10-16	Bromley	2026-05-08	Morecambe	25	5	30	—	—	1	**1**	—	25	6	31	—		
Reece Daly	(England)	MF	2004-09-09	2022-07-01	youth team	2025-05-25	Warrington Town	13	12	25	1	3	3	**6**	—	16	15	31	1		
Scott Brown	(England)	MF	1985-05-08	2012-09-04	Macclesfield Town	2013-05-17	Southport	13	9	22	1	6	3	**9**	—	19	12	31	1		
Danny Harrison	(England)	MF	1982-11-04	2013-05-26	Tranmere Rovers	2015-01-20	Connah's Quay Nomads	22	7	29	2	1	—	**1**	—	23	7	30	2		
Michael Aspin	(England)	DF	1989-10-20	2010-07-21	Northwich Victoria	2011-09-03	Hyde United	25	1	26	—	2	2	**4**	—	27	3	30	—		
Tom Field	(England)	MF	1985-08-02	2010-08-23	Droylsden	2011-05-25	Northwich Victoria	16	8	24	1	6	—	**6**	2	22	8	30	3		
Joe Lynch	(England)	MF	1999-10-11	2022-06-01	Runcorn Linnets	2023-05-26	Runcorn Linnets	8	15	23	2	5	2	**7**	1	13	17	30	3		
Lloyd Marsh-Hughes	(Wales)	FW	2001-04-27	2017-07-01	youth team	2023-01-13	Caernarfon Town	3	16	19	—	1	10	**11**	—	4	26	30	—		
Jordan Hunter	(England)	DF	1999-12-06	2024-06-27	Gateshead	2025-05-25	Atherton Collieries	22	4	26	—	3	—	**3**	—	25	4	29	—		
Josh Askew	(England)	DF	1998-02-20	2020-12-15	Boston United	2022-02-08	Alfreton Town	19	5	24	2	4	1	**5**	—	23	6	29	2		
George Murray-Jones	(England)	GK	2004-10-27	2025-08-29	—	2026-02-02	—	23	—	23	—	6	—	**6**	—	29	—	29	—	on loan from Nottingham Forest	
Alex Kenyon	(England)	DF	1992-07-17	2022-07-11	Ayr United	2023-07-14	Curzon Ashton	22	2	24	1	3	1	**4**	—	25	3	28	1		
Danny Devine	(England)	MF	1997-09-04	2022-08-11	Carlisle United	2023-05-26	Guiseley	16	4	20	1	7	1	**8**	—	23	5	28	1		
Paddy Lacey	(England)	MF	1993-03-16	2020-09-30	Stalybridge Celtic	2022-02-15	Warrington Rylands 1906	19	3	22	4	5	—	**5**	—	24	3	27	4		
Hayden Carson	(England)	DF	2006-02-19	2025-08-28	—	2026-01-08	—	20	1	21	—	6	—	**6**	—	26	1	27	—	on loan from Wolverhampton Wanderers	
Hayden Carson	(England)	DF	2006-02-19	2026-03-06	—	2026-05-08	—	20	1	21	—	6	—	**6**	—	26	1	27	—	on loan from Salford City	
Jamie Reed	(England)	FW	1987-08-13	2013-07-03	York City	2014-02-27	South Melbourne	13	9	22	2	3	1	**4**	1	16	10	26	3		
Jimmy Storer	(Republic of Ireland)	GK	2004-10-04	2025-01-10	—	2025-05-25	—	25	—	25	—	—	—	—	—	25	—	25	—	on loan from Wolverhampton Wanderers	
Dion Kelly-Evans	(England)	DF	1996-09-21	2025-07-03	Woking	2026-05-08		22	1	23	1	—	2	**2**	—	22	3	25	1		
Paul Turnbull	(England)	MF	1989-01-23	2017-06-09	Barrow	2018-03-08	Stockport County	17	4	21	—	3	1	**4**	—	20	5	25	—		
