= Brandon Taylor (footballer) =

English footballer (born 1999)

Personal information
- Full name: Brandon Lewis Taylor
- Date of birth: 10 May 1999 (age 27)
- Place of birth: Gateshead, England
- Position: Defender

Youth career
- Birtley Town
- Sunderland

Senior career*
Years	Team	Apps	(Gls)
2018–2021	Sunderland	0	(0)
2021–2022	Darlington	3	(0)
2021–2022	→ South Shields (loan)	1	(0)
2022	→ Bishop Auckland (loan)		
- * Club domestic league appearances and goals as of 16:57, 11 May 2022 (UTC)

Brandon Lewis Taylor (born 10 May 1999) is an English professional footballer who plays as a defender, most recently for Darlington. Taylor began his career with Sunderland and played for them in the FA Cup and EFL Trophy before being released in 2021.

== Life and career ==
Taylor was born in 1999 in Gateshead, Tyne and Wear. He played representative football for Chester-le-Street Primary Schools, and played for Birtley Town under-9s before joining Sunderland's Academy as a nine-year-old. He took up a two-year scholarship in 2015. A club profile later that year described him as "a full-back who prefers to play on the right side [who] has an attacking style about him and loves to get forward at every given opportunity." He signed a two-year professional contract at the end of the 2015–16 season, and by the time that deal expired, he was a regular at under-23 level, playing at centre back as well as full back, had been an unused substitute for Sunderland U21 in the 2017–18 EFL Trophy, and was rewarded with a further year's contract.

He was an unused substitute for Sunderland's first team in August 2018 for the EFL Cup-tie defeat against Sheffield Wednesday, and made his senior debut three months later in the EFL Trophy. He replaced Jordan Hunter after 61 minutes as Sunderland's 1–0 victory confirmed them as group winners. He signed a 12-month contract extension in the 2019 close season, and his next first-team outing came in October, again in the EFL Trophy.

With several centre backs unavailable through injury or international duty, Taylor played the whole of the FA Cup first-round replay against Gillingham which Sunderland lost 1–0 after extra time. The Chronicle reported that "Taylor showed no signs of looking out of place. He read the game well throughout, and more than held his own in a couple of tussles", and despite a lack of height, "won more than his fair share of headers". Manager Phil Parkinson's appreciation of his performance extended to yet another year on his contract but not to a place in the team. Taylor made three starts in the 2020–21 EFL Trophy, and Parkinson's successor, Lee Johnson, gave him a seat on the bench when eight first-team players were unavailable because of COVID-19 for the League One match against AFC Wimbledon in December 2020, but he was released when his contract expired at the end of that season.

In August 2021, he signed for National League North club Darlington, renewing a defensive partnership with Alex Storey, who had played alongside him for Chester-le-Street Primary Schools, was a member of the same scholarship intake at Sunderland and a regular team-mate for the club's U23s. Taylor had what the Northern Echo dubbed a "baptism of fire" when pitted against the experienced and powerful striker Matt Rhead in Darlington's opening match of the season, a 3–2 defeat at home to Alfreton Town. On 3 December 2021, Taylor joined Northern Premier League Premier Division club South Shields on loan until 1 January 2022. On 11 March 2022, Taylor joined Northern League Division One side Bishop Auckland on loan until 16 April 2022. On 11 May 2022, Taylor was released by Darlington.

== Career statistics ==
As of match played 7 May 2022

Appearances and goals by club, season and competition
Club	Season	League			FA Cup		EFL Cup		Other		Total	
Club	Season	Division	Apps	Goals	Apps	Goals	Apps	Goals	Apps	Goals	Apps	Goals
Sunderland	2018–19	League One	0	0	0	0	0	0	1 (Note: Appearance in EFL Trophy)	0	1	0
Sunderland	2019–20	League One	0	0	1	0	0	0	1	0	2	0
Sunderland	2020–21	League One	0	0	0	0	0	0	3	0	3	0
Sunderland	Total		0	0	1	0	0	0	5	0	6	0
Darlington	2021–22	National League North	3	0	0	0	—		0	0	3	0
South Shields (loan)	2021–22	Northern Premier League; Premier Division	1	0	0	0	—		0	0	1	0
Career total			4	0	1	0	0	0	5	0	10	0
