= Chris Maguire =

Scottish association football player

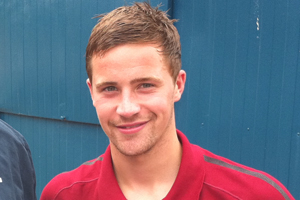
- Maguire in 2010

Personal information
- Full name: Christopher Patrick Joseph Maguire
- Date of birth: 16 January 1989 (age 37)
- Place of birth: Bellshill, Scotland
- Position: Forward

Team information
- Current team: Cove Rangers
- Number: 77

Senior career*
Years	Team	Apps	(Gls)
2005–2011	Aberdeen	131	(16)
2010	→ Kilmarnock (loan)	14	(4)
2011–2012	Derby County	7	(1)
2012	→ Portsmouth (loan)	11	(3)
2012–2015	Sheffield Wednesday	79	(18)
2013	→ Coventry City (loan)	3	(2)
2015–2016	Rotherham United	14	(0)
2015–2016	→ Oxford United (loan)	6	(0)
2016–2017	Oxford United	63	(17)
2017–2018	Bury	24	(2)
2018–2021	Sunderland	101	(22)
2021–2022	Lincoln City	34	(4)
2023	Ayr United	12	(0)
2023–2025	Eastleigh	84	(20)
2025–	Cove Rangers	21	(3)

International career^{‡}
2004	Scotland U16	2	(0)
2007	Scotland U19	3	(1)
2008–2010	Scotland U21	11	(6)
2011	Scotland	2	(0)
- * Club domestic league appearances and goals as of 4 May 2026 ‡ National team caps and goals as of 31 May 2011

Christopher Patrick Joseph Maguire (born 16 January 1989) is a Scottish professional footballer who plays as a forward for Scottish League One side Cove Rangers. He made two international appearances for Scotland in 2011.

== Club career ==
=== Aberdeen ===
Maguire made his debut for Aberdeen on 7 May 2006, coming on as a substitute in their final match of the 2005–06 season, where he set up John Stewart for the equaliser in a 2–2 draw against SPL champions Celtic. His first starting appearance in the senior team was on 26 December against Kilmarnock, where he also scored his first senior goal in the sixth minute.

The following season, Maguire scored some vital goals, including a 94th-minute winner in a thrilling 4–3 match against Inverness CT on 29 March 2008 and a brace in the 2–1 win over Falkirk five days later. On 16 July 2008, Maguire signed a three-year contract extension with the Dons.

In February 2009, having been regularly kept out of the starting eleven by first-choice striking pair Darren Mackie and Lee Miller, Maguire requested to go out on loan in search of regular first-team football. After this request was promptly turned down, Maguire scored two goals in Aberdeen's 5–0 Scottish Cup victory over East Fife.

==== Kilmarnock (loan) ====
During the January transfer window in 2010, Maguire moved on loan to Kilmarnock, reuniting him with former Aberdeen boss Jimmy Calderwood. On his debut against Celtic, he scored the only goal of the game to give Kilmarnock their first league win in eight games. Maguire's form after signing saw him win the Scottish Premier League Young Player of the Month award for February 2010. He scored 4 goals in 14 games to help Kilmarnock stay in the Scottish Premier League.

=== Derby County ===
On 1 June 2011, it was announced Maguire would sign for English Championship side Derby County on the expiration of his Aberdeen contract, having agreed a three-year deal with Derby. The transfer was formally completed on 29 June when Derby agreed a compensation package with Aberdeen, speculated to be in the region of £400,000. Maguire's first start, and first goal, came on 29 October, in a 3–1 win over Portsmouth. He was subsequently praised for his patience and work ethic by first-team coach Andy Garner, having been kept out of the team by the form of fellow strikers Jamie Ward, Theo Robinson and Steve Davies. However, he failed to cement a place in the first team, finding himself behind strikers Theo Robinson, Steve Davies, Jamie Ward and youth product Callum Ball. Maguire scored a hat-trick against Pinxton in a 4–0 win during the quarter-final of the Derbyshire Senior Cup.

==== Portsmouth (loan) ====
On 9 March 2012, Maguire joined Championship strugglers Portsmouth on a month-long emergency loan. He wore the number 22 shirt during his time at Fratton Park. Maguire scored his first Portsmouth goal in his side's 4–1 victory over Birmingham City at Fratton Park on 20 March 2012. Maguire received praise from Portsmouth manager Michael Appleton for his role in a 2–0 win against Hull City on 27 March 2012 and hoped for an extension to his loan. After one month at Pompey, the club extended Maguire's loan until the end of the season. Maguire impressed for Portsmouth where he scored 3 goals in 11 appearances, and picked up the club's Player of the Month award in the game against parent club Derby County (a game which Maguire was ineligible to play in) on 21 April 2012, a game which saw Portsmouth relegated in a 2–1 defeat.

=== Sheffield Wednesday ===
On 22 May 2012, Maguire was transfer-listed by Derby. Sheffield Wednesday, newly promoted to the Championship, had two bids rejected to buy Maguire in May 2012 but on 21 June 2012, they announced that Maguire had joined them on a three-year deal. He made his Owls debut in the 4–2 League Cup win over Oldham Athletic on 13 August. However Maguire had to wait until 16 March 2013 for another league appearance in the 0–2 defeat against Cardiff City. When right midfielder Michail Antonio was brought down and injured, Maguire came on as substitute. Maguire made his second league appearance, again as substitute, in the 2–1 victory against South Yorkshire rivals Barnsley. Maguire made a fourth appearance for the Owls in a 3–2 victory over Blackburn Rovers, replacing Jermaine Johnson in the 84th minute. Maguire came on as substitute and grabbed a late six-yard goal in the 92nd minute in his first goal for the Owls against Millwall in 2–1 away victory on 9 April 2013.

Maguire scored his first goal of the 2014–15 season against Millwall, a 57th-minute free-kick with the game ending 1–1. Maguire had to wait until 4 October 2014 for his second goal of the season, a thunderous strike against local rivals Leeds United in the 52nd minute with the game ending 1–1. Maguire's third goal of the season came against Blackpool on Boxing Day, a 39th-minute penalty which proved to be the winner in a 1–0 victory. On 10 January 2015, Maguire scored his fourth goal of the 2014–15 season at Nottingham Forest in Wednesday's 2–0 victory and followed that up the following week with a penalty against Bolton Wanderers in a 2–1 defeat. On 4 March 2015, Maguire scored his sixth goal of the season, after coming on as substitute, against Blackburn Rovers in another 2–1 defeat. On 18 April 2015 Maguire scored the equaliser from the penalty spot in the 95th minute of the game against AFC Bournemouth in a 2–2 draw. The following week on 25 April 2015, Maguire scored his eighth and final goal of 2014–15 against Yorkshire rivals Leeds United, which was again from the penalty spot; Wednesday went on to lose the game 2–1.

==== Coventry City (loan) ====
On 28 November 2013, Maguire signed on loan for Coventry City until 5 January 2014. He made his Sky Blues debut on 30 November away to Milton Keynes Dons, replacing Carl Baker in the 65th minute. He scored two free-kicks in the 86th and 90th minutes to win the game for Coventry. Maguire was recalled by caretaker manager Stuart Gray for Sheffield Wednesday's Boxing Day fixture against Blackburn Rovers.

=== Rotherham United ===
On 24 July 2015, Maguire signed a one-year contract with Rotherham United. He made his debut in the first game of the season on 8 August 2015 against MK Dons at the New York Stadium. In total, he made 14 league appearances (8 as a substitute) for Rotherham, plus one substitute appearance in the League Cup, but did not score during his spell at the club.

==== Oxford United (loan) ====
On 26 November 2015, Maguire signed a two-month loan deal with Oxford United. He made six League appearances, played in a notable victory over Premier League side Swansea City in the third round of the FA Cup, and scored against Yeovil Town in the area semi-finals of the Football League Trophy.

=== Oxford United ===
On 1 February 2016, Maguire's contract with Rotherham was terminated by mutual agreement, and on the same day he signed a contract with Oxford until the end of the 2015–16 season. Maguire scored 4 league goals in 2015–16, all during the final six games of the season culminating in Oxford's promotion to League One. After prolonged negotiations he signed a further one-year deal in July 2016. He scored a career-best 17 goals for Oxford in 2016–17 but declined their offer of a new contract.

=== Bury ===
Maguire signed for Bury in July 2017 on a free transfer.

=== Sunderland ===
On 22 June 2018, Maguire signed a two-year deal with EFL League One side Sunderland. On 24 August 2019, in his second season at the club, Maguire scored a hat-trick against Wimbledon in a 3–1 home win. On 25 May 2021 it was announced that he would leave Sunderland at the end of the season, following the expiry of his contract.

=== Lincoln City ===
On 7 July 2021, Maguire signed a two-year deal with Lincoln City, joining Imps manager Michael Appleton for a third time. Upon joining the club, he was given a number ten shirt ahead of the new season.

However, Maguire's debut was delayed for a month when he suffered a calf injury. Maguire would make his debut again Cambridge United, on 11 September 2021, coming off the bench in a 5–1 victory. He scored his first goal for Lincoln City against Carlisle United in the second round of the EFL Trophy, breaking the deadlock in the 45th minute, as the club lose on penalties (in which he missed) following a 1–1 draw. Maguire then scored his first league goal for Lincoln City, scoring from a penalty, in a 3–2 lost against Milton Keynes Dons on 26 December 2021. Two weeks later on 11 January 2022, he scored a hat trick against his old club Sunderland, winning 3–1. In July 2022, Maguire was told by new Lincoln manager Mark Kennedy that he was free to leave the club.

On 22 August 2022, Maguire was charged by The FA for breaching betting rules after Maguire was alleged to place 52 bets on football matches between March 2017 and February 2022. Maguire was subsequently suspended by Lincoln City. On 1 September 2022, Lincoln and Maguire parted ways by mutual consent.

Hartlepool United announced on 12 September 2022 that Maguire had signed for them. This signing was not completed, however, with their interim manager Keith Curle saying in October that the deal had been placed on hold until there was an outcome to the case regarding his bets on football matches. Maguire and the club had agreed a contract which reflected the possibility of him being banned due to that case, but the PFA rejected that change to the standard player contract.

=== Ayr United ===
On 20 February 2023, Maguire joined Scottish Championship club Ayr United on a short-term deal until the end of the season.

=== Eastleigh ===
On 24 July 2023, Maguire signed for National League club Eastleigh.

He departed the club at the end of the 2024–25 season.

== International career ==
Maguire was a regular member of the Scottish under-21 team. He scored a goal from the halfway line immediately after the restart in the qualifying match for Euro 2011 against Iceland.

In February 2011, Maguire won his first cap for Scotland in a 3–0 win over Northern Ireland in the 2011 Nations Cup in Dublin.

== Career statistics ==
As of end of 2024–25 season

Appearances and goals by club, season and competition
Club	Season	League			National Cup		League Cup		Other		Total	
Club	Season	Division	Apps	Goals	Apps	Goals	Apps	Goals	Apps	Goals	Apps	Goals
Aberdeen	2005–06	Scottish Premier League	1	0	0	0	0	0	0	0	1	0
Aberdeen	2006–07	Scottish Premier League	19	1	2	0	1	0	0	0	22	1
Aberdeen	2007–08	Scottish Premier League	28	4	3	0	0	0	4 (Note: Appearances in UEFA Cup)	0	35	4
Aberdeen	2008–09	Scottish Premier League	31	3	3	2	1	1	0	0	35	6
Aberdeen	2009–10	Scottish Premier League	17	1	1	0	1	0	2 (Note: Appearances in UEFA Europa League)	0	21	1
Aberdeen	2010–11	Scottish Premier League	35	7	5	4	4	1	0	0	44	12
Aberdeen	Total		131	16	14	6	7	2	6	0	158	24
Kilmarnock (loan)	2009–10	Scottish Premier League	14	4	0	0	0	0	0	0	14	4
Kilmarnock (loan)	Total		14	4	0	0	0	0	0	0	14	4
Derby County	2011–12	Championship	7	1	0	0	1	1	0	0	8	2
Derby County	Total		7	1	0	0	1	1	0	0	8	2
Portsmouth (loan)	2011–12	Championship	11	3	0	0	0	0	0	0	11	3
Portsmouth (loan)	Total		11	3	0	0	0	0	0	0	11	3
Sheffield Wednesday	2012–13	Championship	10	1	1	0	3	0	0	0	14	1
Sheffield Wednesday	2013–14	Championship	27	9	4	1	1	0	0	0	32	10
Sheffield Wednesday	2014–15	Championship	42	8	1	0	3	0	0	0	46	8
Sheffield Wednesday	Total		79	18	6	1	7	0	0	0	92	19
Coventry City (loan)	2013–14	League One	3	2	0	0	0	0	0	0	3	2
Coventry City (loan)	Total		3	2	0	0	0	0	0	0	3	2
Rotherham United	2015–16	Championship	14	0	0	0	1	0	0	0	15	0
Rotherham United	Total		14	0	0	0	1	0	0	0	15	0
Oxford United (loan)	2015–16	League Two	6	0	1	0	0	0	2 (Note: Appearance(s) in Football League Trophy)	1	9	1
Oxford United	2015–16	League Two	15	4	0	0	0	0	1	0	16	4
Oxford United	2016–17	League One	42	13	4	1	1	0	7 (Note: Appearances in EFL Trophy)	3	54	17
Oxford United	Total		63	17	5	1	1	0	10	4	79	22
Bury	2017–18	League One	24	2	2	0	0	0	3	0	29	2
Bury	Total		24	2	2	0	0	0	3	0	29	2
Sunderland	2018–19	League One	33	7	2	0	1	0	7 (Note: Four appearances and one goal in EFL Trophy, three appearances and one goal in League One play-offs)	2	43	9
Sunderland	2019–20	League One	35	10	2	0	2	0	2	1	41	11
Sunderland	2020–21	League One	33	5	1	0	1	0	6 (Note: Five appearances and three goals in EFL Trophy, one appearance in League One play-offs)	3	41	8
Sunderland	Total		101	22	5	0	4	0	15	6	125	28
Lincoln City	2021–22	League One	32	4	2	0	0	0	2	1	36	5
Lincoln City	2022–23	League One	2	0	0	0	1	0	0	0	3	0
Lincoln City	Total		34	4	2	0	1	0	2	1	39	5
Ayr United	2022−23	Scottish Championship	12	0	1	0	0	0	2 (Note: Appearance(s) in Scottish Championship play-offs)	0	15	0
Eastleigh	2023–24	National League	42	12	5	3	—		1 (Note: Appearance(s) in FA Trophy)	0	48	15
Eastleigh	2024–25	National League	42	8	1	0	—		3	1	46	9
Eastleigh	Total		84	20	6	3	0	0	4	1	94	24
Career total			577	107	41	11	22	3	42	12	682	135

== Honours ==
Oxford United

- Football League Two runner-up: 2015–16
- Football League/EFL Trophy runner-up: 2015–16, 2016–17

Sunderland

- EFL Trophy: 2020–21

Individual

- Scottish Premier League Young Player of the Month: February 2010, September 2010
- EFL League One Goal of the Month: September 2018, October 2018
