= Jack Bainbridge =

English association football player

Personal information
- Date of birth: 21 May 1998 (age 28)
- Place of birth: Fazakerley, England
- Position: Midfielder

Team information
- Current team: Chester
- Number: 18

Youth career
- 2012–2017: Everton
- 2017–2018: Swansea City
- 2018-2020: Sunderland

Senior career*
Years	Team	Apps	(Gls)
2018–2020	Sunderland	0	(0)
2020–2024	Southport	115	(9)
2024	Marine	9	(1)
2024–	Chester	60	(5)
- * Club domestic league appearances and goals as of 10:40, 16 August 2026 (UTC)

Jack Bainbridge (born 21 May 1998) is an English semi-professional footballer who plays as a midfielder for National League North club Chester.

== Club career ==
=== Sunderland ===
Bainbridge made his debut for Sunderland in the EFL Trophy on 13 November 2018 against Morecambe.

=== Southport ===
On 29 August 2020 Bainbridge signed for Southport on a free transfer from Sunderland. In January 2022 Bainbridge signed a contract extension through to May 2024.

He had his contract terminated by mutual consent in January 2024.

=== Marine ===
On 29 February 2024, Bainbridge joined Northern Premier League Premier Division club Marine. He scored in Marine's 2-1 Northern Premier League playoff final win over Macclesfield.

=== Chester ===
Bainbridge signed for Chester on a one-year deal in May 2024.

== Career statistics ==
As of match played 12 June 2024

Appearances and goals by club, season and competition
Club	Season	League			FA Cup		League Cup		Other		Total	
Club	Season	Division	Apps	Goals	Apps	Goals	Apps	Goals	Apps	Goals	Apps	Goals
Sunderland	2018–19	League One	0	0	0	0	0	0	1 (Note: Appearance in the EFL Trophy)	0	1	0
Sunderland	2019–20	League One	0	0	0	0	0	0	0	0	0	0
Sunderland	Total		0	0	0	0	0	0	1	0	1	0
Southport	2020–21	National League North	12	0	3	0	—		0	0	15	0
Southport	2021–22	National League North	39	3	2	0	—		3 (Note: Appearance(s) in FA Trophy)	0	44	3
Southport	2022–23	National League North	45	3	1	0	—		1	1	47	4
Southport	2023–24	National League North	19	3	0	0	—		2	0	21	3
Southport	Total		115	9	6	0	0	0	6	1	127	10
Marine	2023–24	Northern Premier League Premier	9	1	0	0	0	0	2	1	11	2
Career total			124	10	6	0	0	0	9	2	138	12
