= Benjamin Kimpioka =

Swedish footballer

Personal information
- Full name: Benjamin Mbunga Kimpioka
- Date of birth: 21 February 2000 (age 26)
- Place of birth: Uppsala, Sweden
- Height: 1.83 m (6 ft 0 in)
- Position: Forward

Team information
- Current team: Asteras Tripolis
- Number: 75

Youth career
- –2011: Knivsta IK
- 2012–2016: IK Sirius
- 2016–2018: Sunderland

Senior career*
| Years | Team | Apps | (Gls) |
| 2018–2022 | Sunderland | 10 | (2) |
| 2021 | → Torquay United (loan) | 8 | (0) |
| 2021 | → Southend United (loan) | 2 | (0) |
| 2022–2024 | AIK | 16 | (1) |
| 2023 | → Luzern (loan) | 6 | (1) |
| 2024–2025 | St Johnstone | 43 | (9) |
| 2025–2026 | Sivasspor | 19 | (1) |
| 2026 | Tondela | 10 | (0) |
| 2026– | Asteras Tripolis | 3 | (0) |

International career^{‡}
| 2017–2018 | Sweden U19 | 10 | (0) |
| 2019–2022 | Sweden U21 | 11 | (2) |
- * Club domestic league appearances and goals as of 7 September 2026 ‡ National team caps and goals as of 14:55, 11 June 2022 (UTC)

Benjamin Mbunga Kimpioka (born 21 February 2000) is a Swedish professional footballer who plays as a forward for Super League Greece club Asteras Tripolis. He is able to play as a winger or striker.

== Career ==
=== Sunderland ===
Kimpioka signed for Sunderland from Swedish side IK Sirius as an academy player on 1 July 2016. He made his first team debut for Sunderland as a substitute in an EFL Trophy tie against Stoke City U21s on 4 September 2018. He made his league debut on 2 October 2018 in an EFL League One match against Peterborough United, coming on in the 92nd minute for Jerome Sinclair. He scored just 123 seconds into his third appearance; an EFL Trophy victory over Carlisle United on 10 October 2018. Kimpioka scored his first league goal on 23 November 2019, a 90th-minute equaliser, in a 1–1 home draw against Coventry. After a brief period away from the club, Kimpioka agreed a new 1-year deal with an option of a further year.

=== Torquay United ===
On 27 March 2021, Kimpioka joined National League side Torquay United on loan for the remainder of the 2020–21 season.

=== AIK ===
On 31 March 2022, Kimpioka joined Allsvenskan side AIK for an undisclosed fee.

=== Luzern ===
On 23 January 2023, Kimpioka moved to Luzern in Switzerland on loan with an option to buy.

=== St Johnstone ===
On 2 January 2024, Kimpioka joined Scottish side St Johnstone for an undisclosed fee. He scored his first goal for the club in a 1–0 victory away to Ross County in the Scottish Premiership on 3 February 2024.

== Personal life ==
Born in Sweden, Kimpioka is of Congolese and Angolan descent.

== Honours ==
Sunderland

- EFL Trophy: 2020–21
