= Jordan Hunter (footballer) =

English footballer (born 1999)

Personal information
- Date of birth: 6 December 1999 (age 26)
- Position: Defender

Team information
- Current team: Atherton Collieries

Youth career
- 2008–2018: Liverpool

Senior career*
Years	Team	Apps	(Gls)
2018–2020	Sunderland	0	(0)
2019–2020	→ South Shields (loan)	27	(1)
2020–2023	South Shields	61	(0)
2023–2024	Gateshead	25	(3)
2024	→ South Shields (loan)	11	(1)
2024–2025	Chester	26	(0)
2025–	Atherton Collieries	0	(0)
- * Club domestic league appearances and goals as of 12:10, 2 July 2025 (UTC)

Jordan Hunter (born 6 December 1999) is an English professional footballer who plays for Northern Premier League Division One West club Atherton Collieries.

== Playing career ==
Hunter signed for Sunderland in July 2018, having left Liverpool the previous month. He made his senior debut on 13 November 2018, in the EFL Trophy. He moved on loan to South Shields in August 2019.

He left Sunderland at the end of the 2019–20 season after rejecting a two-year contract offer, returning to South Shields on a permanent basis in July 2020 on a three-year deal.

On 5 June 2023, Hunter signed for National League club Gateshead on a two-year contract. In February 2024 he returned to South Shields on loan.

In June 2024 he signed for Chester.

On 13 June 2025, Hunter joined Northern Premier League Division One West side Atherton Collieries.

== Coaching career ==
Parallel to his playing career, Hunter works as a fitness rehab coach for the Liverpool F.C. Academy.

== Career statistics ==
As of end of 2024–25 season

Appearances and goals by club, season and competition
Club	Season	League			FA Cup		League Cup		Other		Total	
Club	Season	Division	Apps	Goals	Apps	Goals	Apps	Goals	Apps	Goals	Apps	Goals
Sunderland	2018–19	League One	0	0	0	0	0	0	1 (Note: Appearance(s) in EFL Trophy)	0	1	0
Sunderland	2018–19	League One	0	0	0	0	0	0	0	0	0	0
Sunderland	Total		0	0	0	0	0	0	1	0	1	0
South Shields (loan)	2019–20	NPL Premier Division	27	1	2	0	2	0	5 (Note: Four appearances in FA Trophy, one appearance in Durham Senior Cup)	0	36	1
South Shields	2020–21	NPL Premier Division	6	0	4	0	0	0	1 (Note: Appearance(s) in FA Trophy)	0	11	0
South Shields	2021–22	NPL Premier Division	23	0	1	0	0	0	1 (Note: Appearance(s) in NPL Premier Division play-offs)	0	25	0
South Shields	2022–23	NPL Premier Division	32	0	2	0	0	0	3 (Note: Two appearances in FA Trophy, one appearance in Durham Senior Cup)	0	37	0
South Shields	Total		61	0	7	0	0	0	5	0	73	0
Gateshead	2023–24	National League	25	3	1	0	—		1	0	27	3
South Shields (loan)	2023–24	National League North	11	1	—		—		0	0	11	1
Chester	2024–25	National League North	26	0	2	0	—		1	0	29	0
Career total			150	5	12	0	2	0	13	0	177	5

== Honours ==
South Shields

- Northern Premier League: 2022–23
