= Jake Hackett =

English footballer

Personal information
- Full name: Jake Willis Hackett
- Date of birth: 10 January 2000 (age 26)
- Position: Midfielder

Team information
- Current team: Marske United

Youth career
- 2008–2018: Sunderland

Senior career*
Years	Team	Apps	(Gls)
2018–2021	Sunderland	0	(0)
2019–2020	→ Whitby Town (loan)	11	(4)
2020	→ Whitby Town (loan)	4	(0)
2021–2023	Whitby Town	53	(1)
2022–2023	→ Hebburn Town (loan)	16	(1)
2023–	Marske United	9	(0)
- * Club domestic league appearances and goals as of 20:31, 28 December 2023 (UTC)

Jake Willis Hackett (born 10 January 2000) is an English professional footballer who plays as a midfielder for Marske United.

== Career ==
Hackett joined Sunderland at the age of 8. He made his senior debut on 13 November 2018, in the EFL Trophy. In October 2019, Hackett joined Whitby Town on a one-month loan. On 15 November 2019, the deal was extended until 4 January 2020. He then returned to Sunderland, before re-joining Whitby on loan in early March 2020.

Hackett signed permanently for Whitby Town on 14 August 2021. On 2 December 2022, Hackett signed for Hebburn Town on a 28-day loan deal.

On 25 June 2023, Hackett departed Whitby Town before joining Marske United the following day.
