= Dylan Duffy =

Irish footballer (born 2002)

Personal information
- Full name: Dylan Arthur Duffy
- Date of birth: 28 November 2002 (age 23)
- Height: 1.89 m (6 ft 2 in)
- Position: Winger

Team information
- Current team: Chesterfield
- Number: 11

Youth career
- 2017–2019: Shamrock Rovers

Senior career*
Years	Team	Apps	(Gls)
2020	Shamrock Rovers II	9	(1)
2021	Shamrock Rovers	3	(0)
2022	University College Dublin	31	(3)
2023–2025	Lincoln City	49	(3)
2025	→ Chesterfield (loan)	1	(0)
2025–	Chesterfield	56	(6)

International career
2023	Republic of Ireland U21	1	(0)
- * Club domestic league appearances and goals as of 13:50, 22 November 2026 (UTC)

Dylan Arthur Duffy (born 28 November 2002) is an Irish professional footballer who plays as a winger for Chesterfield.

== Career ==
After playing for Shamrock Rovers and University College Dublin, Duffy signed for English club Lincoln City in January 2023.

Having been injured when he signed for the club, he made his debut for Lincoln on 25 March 2023, coming on as a substitute for Danny Mandroiu in the 79th minute of a 2–1 league defeat to Fleetwood Town. He scored his first goal for the Imps away to Wycombe Wanderers on 22 April 2023.

On 27 January 2025, Duffy joined Chesterfield on loan for the remainder of the season. On 31 January, after one appearance, the move was made permanent with Duffy signing a two-and-a-half year deal for an undisclosed fee.

== International career ==
He was called up to the Republic of Ireland U21 for the first time on 6 June 2023 with Lincoln City teammate Sean Roughan. Duffy made his Republic of Ireland U21 debut on 16 June 2023, in a 2–2 draw with Ukraine U21 in a friendly played in Bad Blumau, Austria.

== Betting offences ==
On 11 July 2024, it was revealed that Duffy had been charged by the Football Association with multiple alleged breaches of its gambling laws. On 26 September 2024, he was fined £4,000 of which half was suspended for 12 months, having admitted to the charge at the first opportunity and also being fully co-operative throughout the investigation with the Football Association.

== Career statistics ==
As of match played 21 November 2026

Appearances and goals by club, season and competition
Club	Season	League			National cup		League cup		Other		Total	
Club	Season	Division	Apps	Goals	Apps	Goals	Apps	Goals	Apps	Goals	Apps	Goals
Shamrock Rovers II	2020	League of Ireland First Division	9	1	0	0	0	0	0	0	9	1
Shamrock Rovers	2021	League of Ireland Premier Division	3	0	0	0	0	0	0	0	3	0
University College Dublin	2022	League of Ireland Premier Division	31	3	3	1	0	0	0	0	34	4
Lincoln City	2022–23	EFL League One	7	1	0	0	0	0	0	0	7	1
Lincoln City	2023–24	EFL League One	34	2	1	0	2	0	4 (Note: Appearance(s) in the EFL Trophy.)	0	41	2
Lincoln City	2024–25	EFL League One	8	0	0	0	1	0	4	0	13	0
Lincoln City	Total		49	3	1	0	3	0	8	0	61	3
Chesterfield (loan)	2024–25	EFL League Two	1	0	0	0	0	0	0	0	1	0
Chesterfield	2024–25	EFL League Two	17	2	0	0	0	0	2 (Note: Appearances in the EFL League Two play-offs.)	0	19	2
Chesterfield	2025–26	EFL League Two	35	2	2	0	1	0	3 (Note: Two appearances in the EFL Trophy, one appearance in the play-offs)	1	41	3
Chesterfield	2026–27	EFL League Two	4	2	1	0	0	0	2	2	7	4
Chesterfield	Total		56	6	3	0	1	0	7	3	67	9
Career total			149	13	7	1	4	0	15	3	175	17
