= Hayden Cann =

English footballer (born 2003)

Personal information
- Full name: Hayden James Cann
- Date of birth: 1 October 2003 (age 23)
- Height: 6 ft 2 in (1.89 m)
- Position: Defender

Team information
- Current team: Waterford
- Number: 16

Youth career
- –2020: Lincoln City

Senior career*
Years	Team	Apps	(Gls)
2020–2024	Lincoln City	0	(0)
2021–2022	→ Gainsborough Trinity (loan)	6	(0)
2022	→ Lincoln United (loan)	15	(1)
2022–2023	→ Gainsborough Trinity (loan)	37	(3)
2023–2024	→ Peterborough Sports (loan)	22	(3)
2024	→ Drogheda United (loan)	17	(1)
2024	Dundalk	9	(0)
2025	Derry City	25	(0)
2026–	Waterford	36	(2)
- * Club domestic league appearances and goals as of 11:49, 9 November 2026 (UTC)

Hayden James Cann (born 1 October 2003) is an English professional footballer who plays as a defender for League of Ireland Premier Division club Waterford.

== Career ==
=== Lincoln City ===
Hayden joined Lincoln City at the age of 8 years old. He made his debut as a substitute in an EFL trophy game against Mansfield Town on 6 October 2020. The day after making his debut, he would sign his first professional contract, signing a 3-year deal.

On the 11 August 2021, he joined Gainsborough Trinity on loan with Lincoln City teammate Jovon Makama. On 14 January 2022, he joined Lincoln United on loan with teammate Bobby Deane. On 10 August 2022, he rejoined Gainsborough Trinity on loan for the duration of the season.

On 10 May 2023, it was confirmed that Cann was offered a new contract by Lincoln City which he had accepted. On 22 July 2023, it was confirmed he signed his new contract until at least the summer of 2024 and would join Peterborough Sports on a season-long loan. He was recalled from his loan on 12 January 2024. On 15 January 2023, Cann was loaned out to League of Ireland Premier Division side Drogheda United with teammate Oisin Gallagher.

Following the end of the 2023–24 season, Lincoln City confirmed there was an option in his contract which they were exploring.

=== Dundalk ===
On 1 July 2024, Cann joined his former loan club Drogheda's rivals, Dundalk. He made 9 appearances for the club as they were relegated to the League of Ireland First Division by finishing bottom of the league.

=== Derry City ===
In February 2025, Cann signed for Derry City after a successful trial period with the club during pre-season. He made 26 appearances in all competitions before being released at the end of his contract in November 2025.

=== Waterford ===
On 9 December 2025, Cann signed for League of Ireland Premier Division club Waterford. On 8 November 2026, he started in the 2026 FAI Cup final as his side were defeated 1–0 by his former club Derry City at the Aviva Stadium. On 11 November 2026, he signed a new contract with the club for 2027.

== Career statistics ==
As of match played on 8 November 2026

Appearances and goals by club, season and competition
Club	Season	League			National Cup		League Cup		Other		Total	
Club	Season	Division	Apps	Goals	Apps	Goals	Apps	Goals	Apps	Goals	Apps	Goals
Lincoln City	2020–21	League One	0	0	0	0	0	0	2 (Note: Appearances in EFL Trophy)	0	2	0
Lincoln City	2021–22	League One	0	0	0	0	0	0	—		0	0
Lincoln City	2022–23	League One	0	0	0	0	0	0	—		0	0
Lincoln City	2023–24	League One	0	0	0	0	0	0	—		0	0
Lincoln City	Total		0	0	0	0	0	0	2	0	2	0
Gainsborough Trinity (loan)	2021–22	Northern Premier League	6	0	1	0	—		—		7	0
Lincoln United (loan)	2021–22	NPL Division One East	15	1	0	0	—		—		15	1
Gainsborough Trinity (loan)	2022–23	Northern Premier League	37	3	2	0	—		3 (Note: Appearance(s) in FA Trophy & Northern Premier League playoffs)	0	42	3
Peterborough Sports (loan)	2023–24	National League North	22	3	4	0	—		2 (Note: Appearance(s) in FA Trophy)	0	28	3
Drogheda United (loan)	2024	LOI Premier Division	17	1	—		—		2 (Note: Appearance(s) in Leinster Senior Cup)	0	19	1
Dundalk	2024	LOI Premier Division	9	0	0	0	—		—		9	0
Derry City	2025	LOI Premier Division	25	0	1	0	—		—		26	0
Waterford	2026	LOI Premier Division	36	2	5	0	—		0	0	41	2
Career total			167	10	13	0	0	0	9	0	189	10
