= Ethan Erhahon =

Scottish footballer (born 2001)

Personal information
- Full name: Ethan Jay Osadebawen Erhahon
- Date of birth: 9 May 2001 (age 25)
- Place of birth: Glasgow, Scotland
- Height: 5 ft 8 in (1.73 m)
- Position: Midfielder

Team information
- Current team: Bolton Wanderers
- Number: 21

Youth career
- 2006–2017: St Mirren

Senior career*
Years	Team	Apps	(Gls)
2017–2023	St Mirren	96	(3)
2020	→ Barnsley (loan)	0	(0)
2023–2025	Lincoln City	93	(2)
2025–	Bolton Wanderers	40	(1)

International career
2017–2018	Scotland U17	10	(0)
2018	Scotland U18	2	(0)
2019	Scotland U19	2	(0)
2021	Scotland U21	2	(0)
- * Club domestic league appearances and goals as of 20:46, 23 October 2026 (UTC)

Ethan Jay Osadebawen Erhahon (born 9 May 2001) is a Scottish professional footballer who plays as a midfielder for EFL Championship club Bolton Wanderers.

== Club career ==
=== St Mirren ===
Born in Glasgow, Erhahon joined St Mirren at the age of 5. He was a participant in the SFA's Performance School programme at Holyrood Secondary School. In November 2018 he was praised by manager Oran Kearney. In January 2019, he scored his first senior goal in a 3–2 Scottish Cup win at home to Alloa Athletic.

Erhahon moved to Barnsley on loan in January 2020.

St Mirren accepted an offer from Forest Green Rovers for Erhahon in December 2022.

=== Lincoln City ===
On 31 January 2023, Erhahon joined Lincoln City for an undisclosed fee on a long-contract. He made his debut the following weekend, playing 90 minutes in the 3-0 win against Accrington Stanley on 4 February 2023. He scored his first Lincoln City goal against Blackpool on 26 August 2023, scoring a solo effort after picking the ball up midway inside his own half before dribbling to the edge of Blackpool's box to fire an effort which deflected off the opposition into the top right corner of the goal. Erhahon was given the Players' Player of the Year at the end of the 2023–24 campaign. At the end of the 2024–25 season, Erhahon was linked with a move to EFL Championship side Swansea City.

=== Bolton Wanderers ===
On 25 July 2025, Erhahon joined Bolton Wanderers for an undisclosed fee, signing a four-year contract. The Bolton News reported that Bolton paid £750,000 and that he had agreed to sign for the League One club over Championship cubs Oxford United and Swansea City. He made his debut on the opening day of the season, coming off the bench in a 2–0 defeat against Stockport County.

== International career ==
Born in Scotland, Erhahon is of Nigerian descent. He has represented Scotland at several youth international levels, and made his debut for the under-21 team in June 2021.

== Career statistics ==
As of match played 23 October 2026

Appearances and goals by club, season and competition
Club	Season	League			National cup (Note: Includes Scottish Cup, FA Cup)		League cup (Note: Includes Scottish League Cup, EFL Cup)		Other		Total	
Club	Season	Division	Apps	Goals	Apps	Goals	Apps	Goals	Apps	Goals	Apps	Goals
St Mirren	2017–18	Scottish Championship	1	0	0	0	0	0	1 (Note: Appearance in the Scottish League Challenge Cup.)	0	2	0
St Mirren	2018–19	Scottish Premiership	21	0	2	1	0	0	0	0	23	1
St Mirren	2019–20	Scottish Premiership	0	0	0	0	4	0	0	0	4	0
St Mirren	2020–21	Scottish Premiership	31	2	3	0	6	0	0	0	40	2
St Mirren	2021–22	Scottish Premiership	23	1	2	0	4	0	0	0	29	1
St Mirren	2022–23	Scottish Premiership	20	0	1	0	4	0	0	0	25	0
St Mirren	Total		96	3	8	1	18	0	1	0	123	4
Barnsley (loan)	2019–20	EFL Championship	0	0	0	0	0	0	0	0	0	0
Lincoln City	2022–23	EFL League One	19	0	0	0	0	0	0	0	19	0
Lincoln City	2023–24	EFL League One	43	2	1	0	3	0	3 (Note: Appearance(s) in the EFL Trophy)	0	50	2
Lincoln City	2024–25	EFL League One	31	0	2	0	1	0	4	0	38	0
Lincoln City	Total		93	2	3	0	4	0	7	0	107	2
Bolton Wanderers	2025–26	EFL League One	30	0	1	0	1	0	5 (Note: Three appearances in EFL Trophy, two appearances in League One play-offs)	0	37	0
Bolton Wanderers	2026–27	EFL Championship	10	1	0	0	0	0	0	0	10	1
Bolton Wanderers	Total		40	1	1	0	1	0	5	0	47	1
Career total			229	6	12	1	23	0	14	0	277	7

== Honours ==
Bolton Wanderers

- EFL League One play-offs: 2026

Individual

- Lincoln City Players' Player of the Season: 2023–24
