= 2023–24 Lincoln City F.C. season =

140th season in existence of Lincoln City FC

Lincoln City
2023–24 season
- Chairman: Clive Nates
- Manager: Mark Kennedy (until 18 October); Tom Shaw (caretaker); Michael Skubala (from 13 November)
- Stadium: LNER Stadium
- League One: 7th
- FA Cup: First round (eliminated by Morecambe)
- EFL Cup: Third round (eliminated by West Ham United)
- EFL Trophy: Second round (eliminated by Accrington Stanley)
- Top goalscorer: League: Joe Taylor (10); All: Joe Taylor (10)
- Highest home attendance: 10,168 (vs West Ham United; EFL Cup)
- Lowest home attendance: 1,384 (vs Wolverhampton Wanderers Under-21s; EFL Trophy)
- Average home league attendance: 8,424
- Biggest win: 6–0 (vs Cambridge United; League One)
- Biggest defeat: 3–0 (vs Bolton Wanderers; League One)
Home colours

The 2023–24 season is the 140th season in the history of Lincoln City and their fifth consecutive season in League One. The club are participating in League One, the FA Cup, the EFL Cup, and the 2023–24 EFL Trophy.

== Season overview ==
=== June ===
On 1 June, Lincoln partnered with sports manufacturer Oxen to produdce their playing kits for the next two seasons.

On 2 June, Lincoln confirmed that Branston would remain their front of shirt sponsor for their home kit for the upcoming season.

On 2 June, Lincoln also confirmed that Allen Signs would be their home and away back of shirt sponsor for the season.

On 3 June, the club launched their new home strip for the season.

On 6 June, Dylan Duffy and Sean Roughan were called up to the Republic of Ireland U21 squad.

On 23 June, the players reported back for pre-season training.

=== July ===
On 12 July, Lincoln launched their away strip for the season.

On 12 July, the University of Lincoln becoming the front of shirt sponsor for the away kit.

On 18 July, the club announced that LNER Stadium would have a new capacity of 10,669 after the installation of safe standing.

=== August ===
On 3 August, the club confirmed its squad numbers for the season.

On 3 August, Paudie O'Connor was appointed the new club captain.

On 23 August, the club launched their third strip for the season.

On 31 August, Sean Roughan was called up to the Republic of Ireland U21 squad.

On 31 August, the clubs match against Oxford United was postponed due to international call ups.

=== October ===
On 3 October, the game against Leyton Orient was abandoned due to a medical emergency.

On 16 October, it was confirmed the game against Leyton Orient would need to be replayed.

On 18 October, manager Mark Kennedy and assistant Danny Butterfield left the club.

=== November ===
On 9 November, Sean Roughan was called up to the Republic of Ireland U21 squad.

On 13 November, Michael Skubala was confirmed as the new head coach.

=== December ===
On 5 December, the EFL Trophy tie against Accrington Stanley was postponed due to a frozen playing surface.

On 8 December, the fans voted overwhelmingly in favour of reverting to the iconic badge design used by the club during the eighties and early nineties.

On 28 December, the upcoming game against Shrewsbury Town was postponed due to the visitors progression in the FA Cup.

=== January ===
On 13 January, Chris Cohen was appointed the new assistant head coach.

On 24 January, the club published their annual accounts for the year ending June 2023.

=== March ===
On 14 March, Sean Roughan were called up to the Republic of Ireland U21 squad.

On 18 March, Dylan Duffy were called up to the Republic of Ireland U21 squad.

=== April ===
On 24 April, Ron and Andrew Fowler joined the investment group at Lincoln City through their Liquid Investments, Inc. entity.

=== May ===
On 2 May, the club announced their retained list following the end of the season.

On 2 May, academy coach Amy Kay left Lincoln City's academy to join Brighton & Hove Albion Academy.

== Current squad ==
As of 2 May 2024

No.	Name	Position	Nationality	Place of birth	Date of birth (age)	Signed from	Date signed	Fee	Contract end
Goalkeepers
1	Lukas Jensen	GK	(Denmark)	Helsingør	18 March 1999 (age 27)	Burnley	1 July 2023	Free Transfer	30 June 2025
12	Jordan Wright	GK	(England)	Stoke-on-Trent	27 February 1999 (age 27)	Nottingham Forest	21 January 2022	Undisclosed	30 June 2025
40	Isaac Allan	GK	(England)	Douglas	1 October 2005 (age 21)	Isle of Man	10 July 2022	Free	30 June 2024
Defenders
2	Lasse Sørensen	WB	(Denmark)	Vejen	21 October 1999 (age 27)	Stoke City	23 July 2021	Undisclosed	30 June 2025
4	Lewis Montsma	CB	(Netherlands)	Amsterdam	25 April 1998 (age 28)	FC Dordrecht	14 July 2020	Free Transfer	30 June 2024
5	Adam Jackson	CB	(England)	Darlington	18 May 1994 (age 32)	Hibernian	11 August 2020	Undisclosed	30 June 2025
15	Paudie O'Connor	CB	(Republic of Ireland)	Limerick	14 July 1997 (age 29)	Bradford City	1 July 2022	Free Transfer	30 June 2025
16	Jack Burroughs	WB	(Scotland)	Coventry	21 March 2001 (age 25)	Coventry City	10 August 2023	Loan	31 May 2024
22	Timothy Eyoma	CB	(England)	Hackney	29 January 2000 (age 26)	Tottenham Hotspur	17 August 2021	Undisclosed	30 June 2024
23	Sean Roughan	LB	(Republic of Ireland)	Dublin	14 March 2003 (age 23)	Academy	28 July 2020	—N/a	30 June 2025
25	Alex Mitchell	CB	(England)		7 October 2001 (age 25)	Millwall	17 August 2023	Loan	31 May 2024
38	Charlie Parks	CB	(England)		19 April 2007 (age 19)	Academy	—N/a	—N/a	—N/a
Midfielders
6	Ethan Erhahon	CM	(Scotland)	Glasgow	9 May 2001 (age 25)	St Mirren	31 January 2023	£339,000	30 June 2026
10	Teddy Bishop	CM	(England)	Cambridge	15 July 1996 (age 30)	Ipswich Town	27 July 2021	Undisclosed	30 June 2024
11	Ethan Hamilton	CM	(Scotland)	Edinburgh	18 October 1998 (age 28)	Accrington Stanley	1 August 2023	Undisclosed	30 June 2026
14	Danny Mandroiu	AM	(Republic of Ireland)	Dublin	20 October 1998 (age 28)	Shamrock Rovers	7 July 2022	£30,000	30 June 2024
24	Conor McGrandles	CM	(Scotland)	Falkirk	24 September 1995 (age 31)	Charlton Athletic	1 February 2024	Loan	31 May 2024
28	Jack Moylan	AM	(Republic of Ireland)	Kilbarrack	1 September 2001 (age 25)	Shelbourne	1 January 2024	Free Transfer	30 June 2027
37	Gbolahan Okewoye	CM	(England)			Academy	—N/a	—N/a	—N/a
Forwards
7	Reeco Hackett-Fairchild	RW	(Saint Lucia)	Redbridge	9 January 1998 (age 28)	Portsmouth	14 June 2023	Undisclosed	30 June 2026
9	Joe Taylor	CF	(Wales)	Peterborough	18 November 2002 (age 23)	Luton Town	9 January 2024	Loan	31 May 2024
17	Dylan Duffy	LW	(Republic of Ireland)		28 November 2002 (age 23)	University College Dublin	31 January 2023	Undisclosed	30 June 2025
18	Ben House	CF	(Scotland)	Guildford	5 July 1999 (age 27)	Eastleigh	24 January 2022	Undisclosed	30 June 2025
19	Tyler Walker	CF	(England)	Nottingham	17 October 1996 (age 30)	Coventry City	12 July 2023	Free Transfer	30 June 2025
27	Jovon Makama	CF	(England)	Nottingham	2 February 2004 (age 22)	Derby County	1 July 2022	Free Transfer	30 June 2025
34	Freddie Draper	CF	(England)		28 July 2004 (age 22)	Derby County	1 July 2020	Free Transfer	30 June 2025
41	Zane Okoro	RW	(United States)	Norwalk	7 May 2007 (age 19)	Beachside Soccer Club	—N/a	—N/a	—N/a
Out on Loan
3	Jaden Brown	LB	(England)	Lewisham	24 January 1999 (age 27)	Sheffield Wednesday	4 July 2023	Free Transfer	30 June 2025
8	Alistair Smith	CM	(England)	Beverley	19 May 1999 (age 27)	Sutton United	1 July 2023	Free Transfer	30 June 2025
20	Jay Benn	RB	(England)	Bradford	22 August 2001 (age 25)	FC Halifax Town	1 July 2022	Undisclosed	30 June 2025
21	Hakeeb Adelakun	RW	(England)	Hackney	11 August 1996 (age 30)	Bristol City	1 September 2021	Free Transfer	30 June 2024
26	Oisin Gallagher	CM	(Republic of Ireland)	Derry	2 December 2004 (age 21)	Derry City	1 July 2021	Undisclosed	30 June 2025
29	Zak Bradshaw	CB	(England)	Welwyn Garden City	22 September 2003 (age 23)	Ipswich Town	2 February 2024	Undisclosed	30 June 2026
31	Sam Long	GK	(Scotland)	Redbridge	12 November 2002 (age 23)	Academy	1 July 2020	—N/a	30 June 2025
32	Elicha Ahui	RB	(England)	Nottingham	28 December 2003 (age 22)	Nottingham Forest	1 July 2023	Free Transfer	30 June 2024
33	Hayden Cann	CB	(England)		1 October 2003 (age 23)	Academy	7 October 2020	—N/a	30 June 2024

== Pre-season and friendlies ==
Lincoln confirmed their first friendly against Rotherham United on 23 May 2023. Their next friendly against rivals Grimsby Town was announced on 31 May. On 2 June, they confirmed the club would spend their first week of July in Spain, concluding the visit with a friendly against Stockport County. Four days later another two additions were added to the calendar, against Boston United and Crewe Alexandra. An additional friendly against King's Lynn Town was announced on 19 June.

7 July 2023 Friendly	Stockport County	1–1	Lincoln City	San Pedro del Pinatar
17:00 CEST	Sarcevic 14'	Report	Smith 31'; Ahui (yellow card) 40'	Stadium: Pinatar Arena; Referee: Valera Ojaos

11 July 2023 Friendly	King's Lynn Town	1–1	Lincoln City	King's Lynn
19:45 BST	Crowther 34'	Report	Mandroiu (penalty missed) 54' 54'	Stadium: The Walks

15 July 2023 Friendly	Boston United	0–7	Lincoln City	Boston
15:00 BST		Report	Mandroiu 11' (pen.), 50'; Brown 26'; Hackett-Fairchild 30'; House 52'; Kendall 77'; Cann 90+1'	Stadium: Jakemans Community Stadium; Attendance: 1,514 (593 away)

18 July 2023 Friendly	Lincoln City	3–1	Harrogate Town	Lincoln
	Bishop; Hackett-Fairchild	Report	Cornelius 10'	Stadium: BMW Soper of Lincoln Elite Performance Centre; Attendance: 0 (Played behind closed doors)

22 July 2023 Friendly	Crewe Alexandra	1–2	Lincoln City	Crewe
15:00 BST	Tabiner 57'	Report	Mandroiu 62', 74'	Stadium: Mornflake Stadium; Attendance: 1,216 (112 away)

25 July 2023 Friendly	Grimsby Town	2–0	Lincoln City	Cleethorpes
19:00 BST	Hunt 31'; Rose 39'	Report		Stadium: Blundell Park; Attendance: 2,933 (434 away)

29 July 2023 Friendly	Lincoln City	0–3	Rotherham United	Lincoln
15:00 BST		Report	Rathbone 44'; Cafu 48'; Hugill (penalty missed) 54' 61'; Bramall (yellow card) 68'	Stadium: LNER Stadium; Attendance: 2,535 (465 away)

== Competitions ==
=== League One ===
==== League table ====
Pos	Team	Pld	W	D	L	GF	GA	GD	Pts	Promotion, qualification or relegation
4	Peterborough United	46	25	9	12	89	61	+28	84	Qualification for League One play-offs
5	Oxford United (O, P)	46	22	11	13	79	56	+23	77	Qualification for League One play-offs
6	Barnsley	46	21	13	12	82	64	+18	76	Qualification for League One play-offs
7	Lincoln City	46	20	14	12	65	40	+25	74	
8	Blackpool	46	21	10	15	65	48	+17	73	
9	Stevenage	46	19	14	13	57	46	+11	71	
10	Wycombe Wanderers	46	17	14	15	60	55	+5	65	

Source: EFL Official Website
Rules for classification: 1) Points; 2) Goal difference; 3) Number of goals scored; 4) Head-to-head results; 5) Wins; 6) Away goals; 7) Penalty points (sec 9.5); 8) 12-point sending off offences
(O) Play-off winners; (P) Promoted

==== Results summary ====
Overall								Home						Away					
Pld	W	D	L	GF	GA	GD	Pts	W	D	L	GF	GA	GD	W	D	L	GF	GA	GD
46	20	14	12	65	40	+25	74	10	7	6	36	17	+19	10	7	6	29	23	+6

Last updated: 27 April 2024.
Source: Soccerway

==== Results by round ====
Round	1	2	3	4	5	6	8	9	10	12	13	14	15	16	7^{1}	17	18	11^{2}	19	20	21	22	23	24	25	26	28	29	30	31	32	33	34	35	27^{3}	36	37	38	39	41	42	43	44	40^{4}	45	46
Ground	A	H	A	A	H	A	H	A	H	A	H	A	H	A	H	H	A	A	H	A	A	H	A	H	H	A	H	H	H	A	H	A	H	A	H	H	A	H	H	H	A	A	H	A	A	H
Result	L	W	D	W	W	D	D	L	W	L	L	W	W	D	L	D	L	W	D	W	D	D	L	L	L	L	D	D	D	W	W	D	W	W	W	D	W	W	W	W	W	D	L	W	W	L
Position	21	10	12	8	4	8	9	13	10	14	16	12	9	8	9	9	10	9	9	9	9	9	9	9	11	11	12	11	12	12	10	11	10	10	10	10	9	9	7	6	6	7	8	7	6	7

Updated to match(es) played on 27 April 2024. Source: Soccerway
A = Away; H = Home; W = Win; D = Draw; L = Loss; P = postponed
Notes:
- ^{1} Matchday 7 (vs Oxford United) was postponed due to the international call-ups.
- ^{2} Matchday 11 (vs Leyton Orient) was abandoned due to a medical emergency.
- ^{3} Matchday 27 (vs Shrewsbury Town) was postponed due to Shrewsbury's FA Cup participation.
- ^{4} Matchday 40 (vs Oxford United) was postponed due to the international call-ups.

==== Matches ====
On Thursday, 22 June 2023, the EFL League One fixtures were revealed.

5 August 2023 1	Bolton Wanderers	3–0	Lincoln City	Horwich
15:00 BST	Iredale 4'; Sheehan (yellow card) 17'; Adeboyejo 59'; O'Connor 74' (o.g.); Maghoma (yellow card) 87'; Nlundulu (yellow card) 90+7'	Report	House (yellow card) 27'; Eyoma (yellow card) 45+6'; Mandroiu (yellow card) 49'	Stadium: Toughsheet Community Stadium; Attendance: 20,143; Referee: Will Finnie

12 August 2023 2	Lincoln City	3–0	Wycombe Wanderers	Lincoln
15:00 BST	Hamilton (yellow card) 59'; Hackett-Fairchild 68' (yellow card) 84'; Bishop 73'; Mandroiu 85'	Report	Potts (yellow card) 55'; Scowen (yellow card) 80'	Stadium: LNER Stadium; Attendance: 7,543; Referee: Adam Herczeg

15 August 2023 3	Northampton Town	2–2	Lincoln City	Sixfields, Northampton
19:45 BST	Hoskins (yellow card) 80' (goal) 90+8'; Appéré 86'	Report	Hackett-Fairchild 22'; O'Connor 78'	Stadium: Sixfields Stadium; Attendance: 6,188; Referee: Ollie Yates

19 August 2023 4	Shrewsbury Town	0–1	Lincoln City	Shrewsbury
15:00 BST	Shipley (yellow card) 19'; Anderson (yellow card) 78'	Report	O'Connor (yellow card) 31'; Roughan (yellow card) 40'; Sørensen (yellow card) 49'; Hamilton 79'; Jensen (yellow card) 88'	Stadium: The Croud Meadow; Attendance: 5,602; Referee: Ross Joyce

26 August 2023 5	Lincoln City	3–0	Blackpool	Lincoln
15:00 BST	Mandroiu 7' (pen.); Erhahon 40'; Jensen (yellow card) 53'; Bishop 73' (pen.)	Report	Norburn (yellow card) 70' (red card) 72'	Stadium: LNER Stadium; Attendance: 8,012; Referee: Martin Coy

2 September 2023 6	Bristol Rovers	1–1	Lincoln City	Bristol
15:00 BST	Finley (yellow card) 42'; Vale (yellow card) 84'; Grant 90+4'	Report	Mitchell (yellow card) 45+2'; Jackson 53'; Mandroiu (yellow card) 66'; Smith (yellow card) 71'	Stadium: Memorial Stadium; Attendance: 7,674; Referee: Lewis Smith

16 September 2023 8	Lincoln City	1–1	Carlisle United	Lincoln
15:00 BST	Hamilton 49'; Duffy (yellow card) 77'	Report	Plange 19' (yellow card) 59'; Garner (yellow card) 72'; Mellish (yellow card) 77'; Lavelle (yellow card) 83'; Moxon (yellow card) 89'	Stadium: LNER Stadium; Attendance: 8,514; Referee: Tom Nield

23 September 2023 9	Portsmouth	2–1	Lincoln City	Portsmouth
15:00 BST	Lane 8'; Poole 45+3'; Morrell (yellow card) 71'; Pack (yellow card) 90+7'	Report	Adelakun 5'; Hackett-Fairchild (yellow card) 18'; Erhahon (yellow card) 71'	Stadium: Fratton Park; Attendance: 17,748; Referee: Paul Howard

30 September 2023 10	Lincoln City	2–0	Cheltenham Town	Lincoln
15:00 BST	Sørensen 5', 21'; Jackson (yellow card) 11'; Bishop (yellow card) 44'; Hamilton (yellow card) 81'; Erhahon (yellow card) 89'	Report	Harris (yellow card) 76'; Bevan (yellow card) 81'	Stadium: LNER Stadium; Attendance: 7,220; Referee: Ben Atkinson

7 October 2023 12	Peterborough United	2–0	Lincoln City	Peterborough
15:00 BST	Ajiboye 52' (yellow card) 90+3'; Randall 83'	Report	Roughan (yellow card) 45'; Mandroiu (yellow card) 57'	Stadium: Weston Homes Stadium; Attendance: 9,130; Referee: Sunny Gill

14 October 2023 13	Lincoln City	0–1	Burton Albion	Lincoln
15:00 BST	Mandroiu (red card) 55'; Erhahon (yellow card) 80'	Report	Powell (yellow card) 26'; Hughes (yellow card) 53'; Sweeney (yellow card) 55'; Burroughs 58' (o.g.); Baah (yellow card) 81'	Stadium: LNER Stadium; Attendance: 7,776; Referee: Rebecca Welch

21 October 2023 14	Fleetwood Town	0–1	Lincoln City	Fleetwood
15:00 BST	Simons (yellow card) 36'; Robertson (yellow card) 89'; Nsiala (red card) 90+6'; Vela (yellow card) 90+11'	Report	Mitchell 6'; Jensen (yellow card) 36'; Hamilton (yellow card) 43'; Sørensen (yellow card) 45'; Adelakun (yellow card) 90+2'	Stadium: Highbury Stadium; Attendance: 3,022; Referee: Tom Reeves

24 October 2023 15	Lincoln City	3–1	Charlton Athletic	Lincoln
19:45 BST	Adelakun 33', 57'; Roughan 78'	Report	May 10'	Stadium: LNER Stadium; Attendance: 7,314; Referee: Daniel Middleton

28 October 2023 16	Exeter City	1–1	Lincoln City	Exeter
15:00 BST	Scott (yellow card) 53'; Hartridge (yellow card) 77'; Harper (yellow card) 78'; Trevitt 81'; Sinasolo (yellow card) 89'	Report	Smith 20'; Hamilton (yellow card) 40'; Adelakun (yellow card) 43'; Erhahon (yellow card) 78'; O'Connor (yellow card) 88'	Stadium: St James Park; Attendance: 5,612; Referee: Jeremy Simpson

31 October 2023 7	Lincoln City	0–2	Oxford United	Lincoln
19:45 GMT		Report	Brown 13'; Rodrigues (yellow card) 40'; Jensen 64' (o.g.); O'Donkor (yellow card) 89'	Stadium: LNER Stadium; Attendance: 7,114; Referee: Scott Tallis
Note: Fixture was previously postponed due to international call-ups.

11 November 2023 17	Lincoln City	1–1	Port Vale	Lincoln
15:00 GMT	O'Connor (red card) 53'; Shodipo 90+3'	Report	Arblaster (yellow card) 26' (yellow-red card) 47'; Garrity 34' (yellow card) 69'	Stadium: LNER Stadium; Attendance: 7,751; Referee: Craig Hicks

18 November 2023 18	Stevenage	1–0	Lincoln City	Stevenage
15:00 BST	Piergianni (yellow card) 28'; Reid 68'	Report	Jackson (yellow card) 81'	Stadium: Lamex Stadium; Attendance: 5,045; Referee: Scott Simpson

21 November 2023 11	Leyton Orient	0–1	Lincoln City	Leyton
19:45 GMT	Cooper (yellow card) 70'; Happe (yellow card) 78'	Report	Hamilton (yellow card) 34' (goal) 89'; Eyoma (yellow card) 53'	Stadium: Brisbane Road; Attendance: 8,101; Referee: Sam Allison
Note: Fixture was previously abandoned due to a medical emergency.

25 November 2023 19	Lincoln City	2–2	Barnsley	Lincoln
15:00 GMT	Mandroiu 5' (pen.); Eyoma 88'; Vale (yellow card) 90+2'	Report	Cotter 68'; McAtee 72'; McCart (yellow card) 90+6'	Stadium: LNER Stadium; Attendance: 9,173; Referee: Ross Joyce

28 November 2023 20	Cambridge United	0–3	Lincoln City	Cambridge
19:45 GMT	Ahadme (yellow card) 9'; Cousins (yellow card) 15'	Report	Mandroiu 16' (pen.); Duffy 32'; Vale (yellow card) 77' (goal) 85'; Mitchell (yellow card) 88'	Stadium: Abbey Stadium; Attendance: 5,103; Referee: David Rock

9 December 2023 21	Wigan Athletic	0–0	Lincoln City	Wigan
15:00 GMT	Clare (yellow card) 70'; Sessegnon (yellow card) 80'; McManaman (yellow card) 85'; Morrison (yellow card) 90+4'	Report	Mandroiu (yellow card) 43'; Hamilton (yellow card) 58'; O'Connor (yellow card) 66'; Duffy (yellow card) 90+7'	Stadium: DW Stadium; Attendance: 8,838; Referee: Charles Breakspear

16 December 2023 22	Lincoln City	1–1	Reading	Lincoln
15:00 GMT	Abbey 3' (o.g.); Duffy (yellow card) 38'; Jensen (yellow card) 41'; Hamilton (yellow card) 90+1'	Report	Abbey (yellow card) 22'; Knibbs 56' (yellow card) 75'; Yiadom (yellow card) 75'	Stadium: LNER Stadium; Attendance: 8,109; Referee: Robert Madley

21 December 2023 23	Derby County	3–1	Lincoln City	Derby
19:45 GMT	Hourihane 26' (yellow card) 84'; Wilson 65'; Collins 77' (yellow card) 90+3'	Report	Mandroiu 45+2' (pen.); Jackson (yellow card) 57'; Vale (yellow card) 85'; Erhahon (yellow card) 90'	Stadium: Pride Park Stadium; Attendance: 27,192; Referee: Peter Wright

26 December 2023 24	Lincoln City	0–1	Bolton Wanderers	Lincoln
15:00 GMT	Makaka (yellow card) 35'; Bishop (yellow card) 53'; Mandroiu (red card) 72'; Eyoma (yellow card) 88'	Report	Toal 89'; Dempsey (yellow card) 90+2'	Stadium: LNER Stadium; Attendance: 10,064; Referee: Neil Hair

29 December 2023 25	Lincoln City	1–2	Northampton Town	Lincoln
19:45 GMT	Bishop (yellow card) 41'; Eyoma 61'; O'Connor (red card) 76'	Report	Hondermarck (yellow card) 25'; Guthrie 30'; Bowie (yellow card) 45+2' (goal) 58'; Odimayo (yellow card) 90'; Simpson (yellow card) 90+4'; Hylton (yellow card) 90+8'	Stadium: LNER Stadium; Attendance: 8,661; Referee: Matthew Corlett

1 January 2024 26	Blackpool	2–0	Lincoln City	Blackpool
15:00 GMT	Husband (yellow card) 8'; Casey 29'; Rhodes (yellow card) 36'; Virtue (yellow card) 40'; Hamilton 90+2'	Report	Eyoma (yellow card) 28'	Stadium: Bloomfield Road; Attendance: 10,353; Referee: Marc Edwards

13 January 2024 28	Wycombe Wanderers	1–1	Lincoln City	High Wycombe
15:00 GMT	Taylor 29'; Potts (yellow card) 63'	Report	Hamilton (yellow card) 75'; Erhahon 90+8'	Stadium: Adams Park; Attendance: 4,470; Referee: Scott Oldham

20 January 2024 29	Lincoln City	0–0	Derby County	Lincoln
15:00 GMT	Taylor (yellow card) 68'; Draper (yellow card) 68'	Report	Elder (yellow card) 18'; Wilson (yellow card) 45+2'	Stadium: LNER Stadium; Attendance: 9,735; Referee: Ollie Yates

27 January 2024 30	Lincoln City	0–0	Peterborough United	Lincoln
15:00 GMT	Hackett-Fairchild (yellow card) 21'	Report	Burrows (yellow card) 90+4'	Stadium: LNER Stadium; Attendance: 9,647; Referee: Christopher Pollard

3 February 2024 31	Burton Albion	0–1	Lincoln City	Burton upon Trent
15:00 GMT	Moon (yellow card) 6'; Oshilaja (yellow card) 17'; Brayford (yellow card) 21'; Powell (yellow card) 45+1'; Sweeney (yellow card) 49'; Bola (yellow card) 67'; Kamwa (yellow card) 74'; Ola-Adebomi (yellow card) 90+7'	Report	Mitchell (yellow card) 23' (yellow-red card) 29'; Hackett-Fairchild 54'; House (yellow card) 90+3'; Sørensen (yellow card) 90+6'	Stadium: Pirelli Stadium; Attendance: 3,995; Referee: Jeremy Simpson

10 February 2024 32	Lincoln City	2–1	Fleetwood Town	Lincoln
15:00 GMT	O'Connor (yellow card) 19'; House (yellow card) 45+2' (goal) 53'; Erhahon (yellow card) 45+3'; Sørensen 57'	Report	Omochere 34'; Lawal (yellow card) 41' (yellow-red card) 45+3'; Stockley (yellow card) 45+2'	Stadium: LNER Stadium; Attendance: 8,282; Referee: Daniel Middleton

13 February 2024 33	Charlton Athletic	1–1	Lincoln City	Charlton, London
19:45 GMT	Kanu (yellow card) 36'; Ladapo 73'; Anderson (yellow card) 75'; Camará (yellow card) 76'	Report	Hackett-Fairchild 37'; House (yellow card) 69'; Roughan (yellow card) 76'; Erhahon (yellow card) 77'; O'Connor (yellow card) 90+11'	Stadium: The Valley; Attendance: 12,713; Referee: David Rock

17 February 2024 34	Lincoln City	1–0	Exeter City	Lincoln
15:00 GMT	Sørensen (yellow card) 42'; Taylor 67'	Report	Sweeney (yellow card) 17'; Harris (yellow card) 56'; Jules (yellow card) 72'	Stadium: LNER Stadium; Attendance: 7,609; Referee: Matthew Corlett

24 February 2024 35	Port Vale	0–2	Lincoln City	Stoke-on-Trent
15:00 GMT	Ojo (yellow card) 14'; Sang (yellow card) 68'; Massey (yellow card) 75'; Debrah (yellow card) 90+2'	Report	Taylor 2'; O'Connor (yellow card) 20'; Hackett-Fairchild 90+3' (pen.)	Stadium: Vale Park; Attendance: 7,148; Referee: James Bell

27 February 2024 27	Lincoln City	3–0	Shrewsbury Town	Lincoln
19:45 GMT	Bishop 6' (penalty missed) 67'; Hackett-Fairchild 58'; Sørensen 67'	Report	Bowman (yellow card) 23'; Bennett (yellow card) 42'	Stadium: LNER Stadium; Attendance: 6,842; Referee: Marc Edwards
Note: Fixture was previously postponed due to Shrewsbury's FA Cup participation.

2 March 2024 36	Lincoln City	0–0	Stevenage	Lincoln
15:00 GMT	House (yellow card) 33'; Erhahon (yellow card) 37'	Report	Reid (yellow card) 27'; Vancooten (yellow card) 75'	Stadium: LNER Stadium; Attendance: 8,129; Referee: Robert Madley

9 March 2024 37	Barnsley	1–5	Lincoln City	Barnsley
15:00 GMT	Kane (yellow card) 41'; Cole (yellow card) 52'; Phillips 77'; O'Keeffe (yellow card) 86'	Report	Taylor 15'; House (yellow card) 45'; Moylan 55', 72'; Mandroiu 58'; Hackett-Fairchild (yellow card) 70'; Makama 79'	Stadium: Oakwell; Attendance: 14,158; Referee: Ben Atkinson

12 March 2024 38	Lincoln City	6–0	Cambridge United	Lincoln
19:45 GMT	Moylan 3', 25'; Taylor 48', 74' (yellow card) 90+7'; Eyoma 85'; Duffy 86' (yellow card) 90+1'	Report	Andrew (yellow card) 80'; Brophy (yellow card) 83'	Stadium: LNER Stadium; Attendance: 7,316; Referee: Scott Oldham

16 March 2024 39	Lincoln City	5–0	Bristol Rovers	Lincoln
15:00 GMT	O'Connor 11'; Taylor 19', 23', 55'; Erhahon (yellow card) 45+4' (yellow-red card) 76'; Makama (yellow card) 65'; Roughan (yellow card) 71'; Hackett-Fairchild 81'	Report	Evans (penalty missed) 71'; Aguilera (yellow card) 85'	Stadium: LNER Stadium; Attendance: 9,392; Referee: Scott Simpson

29 March 2024 41	Lincoln City	1–0	Leyton Orient	Lincoln
15:00 GMT	Hackett-Fairchild (yellow card) 19'; Makama 90'	Report	Sanders (yellow card) 55'; Brown (yellow card) 68'; Sotiriou (yellow card) 73'	Stadium: LNER Stadium; Attendance: 9,922; Referee: Carl Brook

1 April 2024 42	Carlisle United	1–3	Lincoln City	Carlisle
15:00 BST	Lavelle 80'; Barclay (yellow card) 85'; Emmanuel (yellow card) 90+2'	Report	House 10'; Taylor 53'; Bishop 90+3'	Stadium: Brunton Park; Attendance: 7,103; Referee: Seb Stockbridge

6 April 2024 43	Reading	1–1	Lincoln City	Reading
15:00 BST	Wing (yellow card) 67'; Bindon 83'; Elliott (yellow card) 90+4'	Report	Draper 72'	Stadium: Select Car Leasing Stadium; Attendance: 15,209; Referee: Alex Chilowicz

13 April 2024 44	Lincoln City	1–2	Wigan Athletic	Lincoln
15:00 BST	Mandroiu 40'; O'Connor (yellow card) 43'; House (yellow card) 50'; Hackett-Fairchild (yellow card) 51'; Mitchell (yellow card) 66'; Roughan (yellow card) 90+8'; Makama (yellow card) 90+9'	Report	Smith 20'; Hughes (yellow card) 27' (goal) 90'; Smith (yellow card) 41'; Godo (yellow card) 71'; Sessegnon (yellow card) 90+8'; Magennis (yellow card) 90+9'	Stadium: LNER Stadium; Attendance: 9,611; Referee: Martin Coy

16 April 2024 40	Oxford United	0–1	Lincoln City	Littlemore
19:45 BST	Rodrigues (yellow card) 63'; Browne (yellow card) 73'; McGuane (yellow card) 89'; Brannagan (yellow card) 90+3'	Report	Mitchell (yellow card) 16'; Duffy (yellow card) 20' (yellow-red card) 83'; Mandroiu 47' (pen.) (yellow card) 79'; O'Connor (yellow card) 49'; Taylor (yellow card) 75'; House (yellow card) 90+5'; Erhahon (yellow card) 90+6'	Stadium: Kassam Stadium; Attendance: 9,587; Referee: Lee Swabey
Note: Fixture was previously postponed due to international call-ups.

20 April 2024 45	Cheltenham Town	1–2	Lincoln City	Cheltenham
15:00 BST	Sercombe 15' (pen.); Bonds (yellow card) 53'; Davies (yellow card) 75'; Harrop (yellow card) 86'; Long (yellow card) 87'	Report	Taylor 40'; Draper 52'	Stadium: Completely-Suzuki Stadium; Attendance: 5,323; Referee: Thomas Kirk

27 April 2024 46	Lincoln City	0–2	Portsmouth	Lincoln
15:00 BST	House (yellow card) 39'; Taylor (yellow card) 42'; Mandroiu (penalty missed) 53'; Erhahon (yellow card) 90+7'	Report	Towler (yellow card) 37'; Peart-Harris (yellow card) 39' (goal) 81'; Lowery (yellow card) 57'; Moxon (yellow card) 70'; Sparkes (yellow card) 76'; Yengi (yellow card) 90+4'; Saydee (yellow card) 90+9'; Lane 90+12'	Stadium: LNER Stadium; Attendance: 10,006; Referee: Sunny Gill

=== FA Cup ===
Lincoln City were drawn home to Morecambe in the first round on 15 October 2023.

4 November 2023 First round	Lincoln City	1–2	Morecambe	Lincoln
15:00 BST	Sørensen 14' (yellow card) 57'; Eyoma (yellow card) 20'; Hamilton (yellow card) 66'	Report	King (yellow card) 21'; Tutonda (yellow card) 22'; Mellon 43'; Bloxham 53'; Senior (yellow card) 62'; McKiernan (yellow card) 66'	Stadium: LNER Stadium; Attendance: 4,607; Referee: Martin Coy

=== EFL Cup ===
Lincoln City were drawn against Notts County in the first round on 22 June 2023, The second round was drawn on 9 August 2023 against Sheffield United and in the third round against West Ham United.

8 August 2023 First round	Notts County	0–2	Lincoln City	Nottingham
19:45 BST	Baldwin (yellow card) 29' (yellow-red card) 56'; O'Brien (yellow card) 44'	Report	Smith (yellow card) 15'; Roughan 23'; O'Connor (yellow card) 41'; Sørensen 48'	Stadium: Meadow Lane; Attendance: 6,468; Referee: Martin Woods

30 August 2023 Second round	Sheffield United	0–0 (2–3 p)	Lincoln City	Sheffield
19:45 BST	Coulibaly (yellow card) 56'	Report	Burroughs (yellow card) 74'; Erhahon (yellow card) 77'; Eyoma (yellow card) 78'	Stadium: Bramall Lane; Attendance: 11,040; Referee: Paul Tierney
	Penalties
	Norwood (penalty scored); Marsh (penalty missed); Osula (penalty scored); Traore (penalty missed); Egan (penalty missed)		Mandroiu (penalty scored); Bishop (penalty missed); Hamilton (penalty scored); Sørensen (penalty scored)

27 September 2023 Third round	Lincoln City	0–1	West Ham United	Lincoln
19:45 BST	O'Connor (yellow card) 74'	Report	Souček (yellow card) 64' (goal) 70'	Stadium: LNER Stadium; Attendance: 10,168; Referee: Josh Smith

=== EFL Trophy ===
The Imps were drawn into Group G of the Northern section alongside Derby County, Notts County and Wolverhampton Wanderers Under-21s. After finished second in the group, they were drawn away to Accrington Stanley in the second round.

Pos	Div	Team	Pld	W	PW	PL	L	GF	GA	GD	Pts	Qualification
1	L1	Derby County	3	3	0	0	0	8	2	+6	9	Advance to Round 2
2	L1	Lincoln City	3	2	0	0	1	4	2	+2	6	Advance to Round 2
3	ACA	Wolverhampton Wanderers U21	3	1	0	0	2	3	7	−4	3	
4	L2	Notts County	3	0	0	0	3	2	6	−4	0	

Updated to match(es) played on 8 November 2023. Source: EFL.com

19 September 2023 Group stage	Derby County	2–0	Lincoln City	Derby
19:00 BST	Fornah (yellow card) 4'; Elder (yellow card) 36'; Barkhuizen 51'; Sibley 77'	Report	Duffy (yellow card) 53'	Stadium: Pride Park Stadium; Attendance: 2,726; Referee: Seb Stockbridge

10 October 2023 Group stage	Lincoln City	2–0	Wolverhampton Wanderers U21	Lincoln
19:00 BST	Adelakun 19'; Mandroiu (yellow card) 90+1'; Makama 90+3'	Report	Jordão (yellow card) 33'; Hubner (yellow card) 74'	Stadium: LNER Stadium; Attendance: 1,384; Referee: Scott Jackson

7 November 2023 Group stage	Lincoln City	2–0	Notts County	Lincoln
19:00 BST	Burroughs 6'; O'Connor (yellow card) 45+1'; Vale 67'; Shodipo (yellow card) 88'	Report	Tipton (yellow card) 15'	Stadium: LNER Stadium; Attendance: 2,018; Referee: Aaron Jackson

12 December 2023 Second round	Accrington Stanley	1–0	Lincoln City	Accrington
19:00 GMT	Henderson (yellow card) 23'; Woods (yellow card) 43'; Longelo 90+3'		Duffy (yellow card) 73'; Roughan (yellow card) 90+1'	Stadium: Wham Stadium; Attendance: 1,159; Referee: Martin Woods
Note: Fixture was originally scheduled for 5 December but was postponed due to a frozen playing surface.

== Transfers ==
=== In ===
Date	Pos	Player	Transferred from	Fee	Ref
14 June 2023	RW	(Saint Lucia) Reeco Hackett-Fairchild	(England) Portsmouth	Undisclosed	
1 July 2023 (Note: The transfer was announced on 19 June, and would become official on July 1 once his Burnley contract expired)	GK	(Denmark) Lukas Jensen	(England) Burnley	Free Transfer	
1 July 2023 (Note: The transfer was announced on 12 June, and would become official on July 1 once his Sutton United contract expired)	CM	(England) Alistair Smith	(England) Sutton United	Free Transfer	
4 July 2023	LB	(England) Jaden Brown	(England) Sheffield Wednesday	Free Transfer	
12 July 2023	CF	(England) Tyler Walker	(England) Coventry City	Free Transfer	
1 August 2023	CM	(Scotland) Ethan Hamilton	(England) Accrington Stanley	Undisclosed	
6 October 2023	LW	(Republic of Ireland) Olamide Shodipo	Free agent	—N/a	
1 January 2024 (Note: The transfer was announced on 4 September, and would become official on January 1 once his Shelbourne contract expired)	AM	(Republic of Ireland) Jack Moylan	(Republic of Ireland) Shelbourne	Free Transfer	
2 February 2024	CB	(England) Zak Bradshaw	(England) Ipswich Town	Free Transfer	

=== Out ===
Date	Pos	Player	Transferred to	Fee	Ref
20 June 2023	RW	(England) Charles Vernam	(England) Grimsby Town	Undisclosed	
30 June 2023	GK	(England) Sam Green	(Wales) Aberystwyth Town	Released	
30 June 2023	RB	(Wales) Regan Poole	(England) Portsmouth	Released	
30 June 2023	CM	(England) Max Sanders	(England) Leyton Orient	Released	
30 June 2023	CB	(Wales) Joe Walsh	Free agent	Released	
5 January 2024	AM	(Scotland) Julian Donnery	(United States) The Town FC	Released	
5 January 2024	LW	(Republic of Ireland) Olamide Shodipo	(Portugal) C.D. Feirense	Released	
5 January 2024	CM	(England) Morgan Worsfold-Gregg	(United States) HCU Huskies	Released	
18 January 2024	CF	(England) Charley Kendall	(England) Woking	Undisclosed	

=== Loaned in ===
Date	Pos	Player	Loaned from	Fee	Ref
10 August 2023	RM	(Scotland) Jack Burroughs	(England) Coventry City	End of Season	
17 August 2023	CB	(England) Alex Mitchell	(England) Millwall	End of Season	
1 September 2023	CF	(Wales) Jack Vale	(England) Blackburn Rovers	5 January 2024 (Note: Jack Vale was recalled from his loan on 5 January 2024.)	
9 January 2024	CF	(Wales) Joe Taylor	(England) Luton Town	End of Season	
1 February 2024	CM	(Scotland) Conor McGrandles	(England) Charlton Athletic	End of Season	

=== Loaned out ===
Date	Pos	Player	Loaned to	Fee	Ref
22 June 2023	GK	(Scotland) Sam Long	(Scotland) Falkirk	End of season	
7 July 2023	CF	(England) Freddie Draper	(England) Walsall	5 January 2024 (Note: Freddie Draper was recalled from his loan on 5 January 2024.)	
22 July 2023	CB	(England) Hayden Cann	(England) Peterborough Sports	12 January 2024 (Note: Hayden Cann was recalled from his loan on 12 January 2024.)	
28 July 2023	CF	(England) Charley Kendall	(England) Dagenham & Redbridge	18 January 2024 (Note: Charley Kendall joined Woking on a permanent move on 18 January 2024.)	
3 August 2023	RB	(England) Elicha Ahui	(Scotland) Ayr United	1 February 2024 (Note: Elicha Ahui was recalled from his loan on 1 February 2024.)	
11 August 2023	RB	(England) Jay Benn	(England) Solihull Moors	End of season	
8 September 2023	CM	(England) Morgan Worsfold-Gregg	(England) Long Eaton United	8 December 2023	
13 October 2023	CM	(Republic of Ireland) Oisin Gallagher	(England) Peterborough Sports	1 January 2024	
15 January 2024	CB	(England) Hayden Cann	(Republic of Ireland) Drogheda United	End of season	
15 January 2024	CM	(Republic of Ireland) Oisin Gallagher	(Republic of Ireland) Drogheda United	End of season	
22 January 2024	RW	(England) Hakeeb Adelakun	(England) Doncaster Rovers	End of season	
24 January 2024	CM	(England) Alistair Smith	(England) Colchester United	End of season	
26 January 2024	LB	(England) Jaden Brown	(Scotland) St Mirren	End of season	
1 February 2024	RB	(England) Elicha Ahui	(England) Peterborough Sports	End of season	
5 February 2024	CB	(England) Zak Bradshaw	(Republic of Ireland) Dundalk	End of season	

=== Contracts ===
Date	Pos.	Player	Length	Expiry	Ref.
30 June 2023	CB	(Republic of Ireland) Sean Roughan	2 years	June 2025	
7 July 2023	CF	(England) Freddie Draper	—	—	
22 July 2023	CB	(England) Hayden Cann	1 year	June 2024	
2 August 2023	CF	(Scotland) Ben House	2 years	June 2025	
2 May 2024	WB	(Denmark) Lasse Sørensen	One-year option	June 2025	

== Squad statistics ==
=== Appearances ===
As of 27 April 2024

No.	Pos	Nat	Player	Total		League One		FA Cup		EFL Cup		EFL Trophy	
No.	Pos	Nat	Player	Apps	Goals	Apps	Goals	Apps	Goals	Apps	Goals	Apps	Goals
1	GK	(Denmark) DEN	Lukas Jensen	50	0	45	0	1	0	3	0	1	0
2	MF	(Denmark) DEN	Lasse Sørensen	51	6	43+1	4	1	1	2+1	1	1+2	0
5	DF	(England) ENG	Adam Jackson	37	1	29+5	1	1	0	0+1	0	1	0
6	MF	(Scotland) SCO	Ethan Erhahon	50	2	43	2	1	0	3	0	2+1	0
7	FW	(Saint Lucia) LCA	Reeco Hackett-Fairchild	33	7	27+2	7	0	0	3	0	0+1	0
9	FW	(Wales) WAL	Joe Taylor	19	10	19	10	0	0	0	0	0	0
10	MF	(England) ENG	Teddy Bishop	38	4	21+12	4	0	0	0+2	0	1+2	0
11	MF	(Scotland) SCO	Ethan Hamilton	37	3	30	3	1	0	1+2	0	1+2	0
12	GK	(England) ENG	Jordan Wright	4	0	1	0	0	0	0	0	3	0
14	FW	(Republic of Ireland) IRL	Danny Mandroiu	36	8	26+5	8	1	0	2	0	1+1	0
15	DF	(Republic of Ireland) IRL	Paudie O'Connor	43	2	36+2	2	1	0	2	0	2	0
16	DF	(Scotland) SCO	Jack Burroughs	35	1	21+8	0	1	0	2	0	3	1
17	FW	(Republic of Ireland) IRL	Dylan Duffy	41	2	8+26	2	0+1	0	0+2	0	3+1	0
18	FW	(Scotland) SCO	Ben House	21	2	16+3	2	0	0	1+1	0	0	0
19	FW	(England) ENG	Tyler Walker	7	0	2+4	0	0	0	1	0	0	0
22	DF	(England) ENG	Timothy Eyoma	33	3	13+13	3	1	0	2	0	4	0
23	DF	(Republic of Ireland) IRL	Sean Roughan	44	2	35+4	1	0	0	3	1	2	0
24	MF	(Scotland) SCO	Conor McGrandles	5	0	4+1	0	0	0	0	0	0	0
25	DF	(England) ENG	Alex Mitchell	41	1	34+2	1	0	0	2	0	3	0
27	FW	(England) ENG	Jovon Makama	40	3	8+25	2	0+1	0	0+2	0	2+2	1
28	MF	(Republic of Ireland) IRL	Jack Moylan	18	4	7+11	4	0	0	0	0	0	0
34	FW	(England) ENG	Freddie Draper	15	2	9+6	2	0	0	0	0	0	0
Away on loan
3	DF	(England) ENG	Jaden Brown	15	0	3+7	0	0	0	2	0	3	0
8	MF	(England) ENG	Alistair Smith	32	1	12+13	1	1	0	3	0	3	0
20	DF	(England) ENG	Jay Benn	2	0	0	0	0	0	0+1	0	1	0
21	FW	(England) ENG	Hakeeb Adelakun	25	4	10+9	3	1	0	1	0	2+2	1
26	MF	(Republic of Ireland) IRL	Oisin Gallagher	4	0	0+1	0	0	0	0+1	0	1+1	0
No longer at the club
29	FW	(Wales) WAL	Jack Vale	17	2	3+11	1	0+1	0	0	0	2	1
30	FW	(Republic of Ireland) IRL	Olamide Shodipo	9	1	0+6	1	0	0	0	0	2+1	0

=== Goalscorers ===
As of 27 April 2024

Includes all competitive matches.

Rank	Pos.	Nat.	No.	Player	League One	FA Cup	EFL Cup	EFL Trophy	Total
1	FW	(Wales)	9	Joe Taylor	10	0	0	0	10
2	FW	(Republic of Ireland)	14	Danny Mandroiu	8	0	0	0	8
3	FW	(Saint Lucia)	7	Reeco Hackett-Fairchild	7	0	0	0	7
4	DF	(Denmark)	2	Lasse Sørensen	4	1	1	0	6
5	MF	(England)	10	Teddy Bishop	4	0	0	0	4
5	FW	(England)	21	Hakeeb Adelakun	3	0	0	1	4
5	MF	(Republic of Ireland)	28	Jack Moylan	4	0	0	0	4
6	MF	(Scotland)	11	Ethan Hamilton	3	0	0	0	3
6	DF	(England)	22	Timothy Eyoma	3	0	0	0	3
6	FW	(England)	27	Jovon Makama	2	0	0	1	3
7	MF	(Scotland)	6	Ethan Erhahon	2	0	0	0	2
7	DF	(Republic of Ireland)	15	Paudie O'Connor	2	0	0	0	2
7	FW	(Republic of Ireland)	17	Dylan Duffy	2	0	0	0	2
7	FW	(Scotland)	18	Ben House	2	0	0	0	2
7	DF	(Republic of Ireland)	23	Sean Roughan	1	0	1	0	2
7	FW	(Wales)	29	Jack Vale	1	0	0	1	2
7	FW	(England)	34	Freddie Draper	2	0	0	0	2
8	DF	(England)	5	Adam Jackson	1	0	0	0	1
8	MF	(England)	8	Alistair Smith	1	0	0	0	1
8	DF	(Scotland)	16	Jack Burroughs	0	0	0	1	1
8	DF	(England)	25	Alex Mitchell	1	0	0	0	1
8	FW	(Republic of Ireland)	30	Olamide Shodipo	1	0	0	0	1
Own goals					1	0	0	0	1
Total					65	1	2	4	72

=== Disciplinary record ===
As of 27 April 2024

No.	Pos.	Name	League One		FA Cup		EFL Cup		EFL Trophy		Total				
No.	Pos.	Name	15	DF	Paudie O'Connor	8	2	0	0	2	0	1	0	11	2
14	FW	Danny Mandroiu	5	2	0	0	0	0	1	0	6	2			
6	MF	Ethan Erhahon	11	1	0	0	1	0	0	0	12	1			
17	FW	Dylan Duffy	5	1	0	0	0	0	2	0	7	1			
25	DF	Alex Mitchell	5	1	0	0	0	0	0	0	5	1			
11	MF	Ethan Hamilton	8	0	1	0	0	0	0	0	9	0			
18	FW	Ben House	9	0	0	0	0	0	0	0	9	0			
7	FW	Reeco Hackett-Fairchild	6	0	0	0	0	0	0	0	6	0			
22	DF	TJ Eyoma	4	0	1	0	1	0	0	0	6	0			
23	DF	Sean Roughan	5	0	0	0	0	0	1	0	6	0			
2	DF	Lasse Sørensen	4	0	1	0	0	0	0	0	5	0			
1	GK	Lukas Jensen	4	0	0	0	0	0	0	0	4	0			
9	FW	Joe Taylor	4	0	0	0	0	0	0	0	4	0			
5	DF	Adam Jackson	3	0	0	0	0	0	0	0	3	0			
10	MF	Teddy Bishop	3	0	0	0	0	0	0	0	3	0			
27	FW	Jovon Makama	3	0	0	0	0	0	0	0	3	0			
29	FW	Jack Vale	3	0	0	0	0	0	1	0	3	0			
8	MF	Alistair Smith	1	0	0	0	1	0	0	0	2	0			
21	FW	Hakeeb Adelakun	2	0	0	0	0	0	0	0	2	0			
16	MF	Jack Burroughs	0	0	0	0	1	0	0	0	1	0			
30	FW	Olamide Shodipo	0	0	0	0	0	0	1	0	1	0			
34	FW	Freddie Draper	1	0	0	0	0	0	0	0	1	0			

=== Clean sheets ===
As of 27 April 2024

No.	Nat.	Player	Matches played	Clean sheet %	League One	FA Cup	EFL Cup	EFL Trophy	Total
1	(Denmark)	Lukas Jensen	50	42%	19	0	2	0	21
12	(England)	Jordan Wright	4	50%	0	0	0	2	2

== Awards ==
=== Club End of Season Awards ===
Award	Player	Ref.
Player of the Year	(Denmark) Lukas Jensen	
Players Player of the Year	(Scotland) Ethan Erhahon	
Club Partners Player of the Year	(Denmark) Lasse Sørensen	
Goal of the Season	(Republic of Ireland) Jack Moylan	
Golden Boot	(Wales) Joe Taylor	
Young Player of the Year	(Republic of Ireland) Sean Roughan	

=== Sky Bet League One Manager of the Month ===
Month	Manager		Ref.
February	(England) Michael Skubala	Nomination	
March	(England) Michael Skubala	Nomination	

=== Sky Bet League One Player of the Month ===
Month	Player		Ref.
August	(Republic of Ireland) Danny Mandroiu	Nomination	
February	(Saint Lucia) Reeco Hackett-Fairchild	Nomination	
March	(Wales) Joe Taylor	Winner	

=== EFL Young Player of the Month ===
Month	Manager		Ref.
March	(Wales) Joe Taylor	Winner	

=== Sky Bet League One Goal of the Month ===
Month	Player	Goal		Ref
August	(Saint Lucia) Reeco Hackett-Fairchild	22' vs Northampton Town, 15 August	Winner	
March	(Republic of Ireland) Jack Moylan	55' vs Barnsley, 9 March	Nomination	

=== EFL League Cup Player of the Round ===
Round	Player		Ref.
2	(Denmark) Lukas Jensen	Winner	
