= Oisin Gallagher =

English footballer (born 2004)

Oisín Gallagher
Personal information
- Full name: Oisín Jack Gallagher
- Date of birth: 2 December 2004 (age 21)
- Place of birth: Derry, Northern Ireland
- Height: 1.80 m (5 ft 11 in)
- Positions: Defensive midfielder; centre-back

Team information
- Current team: Barnet (on loan from Lincoln City)
- Number: 22

Youth career
- –2021: Derry City
- 2021–2022: Lincoln City

Senior career*
Years	Team	Apps	(Gls)
2022–	Lincoln City	1	(0)
2023	→ Barwell (loan)	12	(2)
2023	→ Peterborough Sports (loan)	11	(1)
2024	→ Drogheda United (loan)	18	(1)
2024–2025	→ Peterborough Sports (loan)	21	(1)
2025	→ Boston United (loan)	4	(0)
2025–2026	→ Boston United (loan)	27	(1)
2026–	→ Barnet (loan)	14	(1)

International career^{‡}
2021–2023	Republic of Ireland U19	8	(0)
2026	Republic of Ireland U21	7	(1)
- * Club domestic league appearances and goals as of 17:10, 21 November 2026 (UTC) ‡ National team caps and goals as of 00:01, 18 November 2026 (UTC)

Oisín Jack Gallagher (born 2 December 2004) is a professional footballer who plays as a defensive midfielder or centre-back for EFL League Two club Barnet, on loan from EFL Championship club Lincoln City. Born in Northern Ireland, he represents the Republic of Ireland at youth international level.

== Club career ==
=== Lincoln City ===
On 3 December 2021, Gallagher signed his first professional contract with Lincoln City. The following season he made his Lincoln City debut against Barnsley in the EFL Trophy. Later that season he signed a new long-term contract, before being sent on a youth loan to Barwell alongside teammate Julian Donnery the following month.

The following season, Gallagher was loaned to Peterborough Sports until January, before returning to Lincoln briefly, making his Lincoln City league debut against Blackpool on New Years Day. He was then loaned out again, this time to League of Ireland Premier Division side Drogheda United with teammate Hayden Cann until the summer. The following season, he rejoined Peterborough Sports on a season-long loan. In January, he was recalled from Peterborough Sports and sent on loan to Boston United.

After injury ruled him out for most of his loan spell the previous season with Boston United, he would return on 15 November 2025, on loan until January. The loan was extended until the end of the season, with Lincoln also taking up the option in his contract keeping him until the summer of 2027.

In July 2026, Gallagher signed a new 3 year contract at Lincoln City, with a further one-year option, before immediately joining Barnet on a season-long loan for the 2026–27 season. He made his Barnet debut, starting in the EFL Cup defeat to Cambridge United. He scored his first goal for Barnet on the opening day of the League Two season, fired into the roof of the net from close range against Salford City.

== International career ==
In March 2026, Gallagher received his first Republic of Ireland U21 call up for their two European Under-21 qualifier games against Moldova U21 and Kazakhstan U21.

== Career statistics ==
As of 21 November 2026

Club	Season	League			National cup (Note: Includes FA Cup)		League cup (Note: Includes EFL Cup)		Other		Total	
Club	Season	Division	Apps	Goals	Apps	Goals	Apps	Goals	Apps	Goals	Apps	Goals
Lincoln City	2022–23	EFL League One	0	0	0	0	0	0	2 (Note: Appearance(s) in EFL Trophy)	0	2	0
Lincoln City	2023–24	EFL League One	1	0	0	0	1	0	2	0	4	0
Lincoln City	2024–25	EFL League One	0	0	0	0	0	0	4	0	4	0
Lincoln City	2025–26	EFL League One	0	0	0	0	0	0	1	0	1	0
Lincoln City	2026–27	EFL Championship	0	0	—		—		—		0	0
Lincoln City	Total		1	0	0	0	1	0	9	0	11	0
Barwell (loan)	2022–23	Southern Football League	12	2	0	0	—		0	0	12	2
Peterborough Sports (loan)	2023–24	National League North	11	1	0	0	—		2 (Note: Appearance(s) in FA Trophy)	0	13	1
Drogheda United (loan)	2024	LOI Premier Division	18	1	0	0	—		2 (Note: Appearance(s) in Leinster Senior Cup)	0	20	1
Peterborough Sports (loan)	2024–25	National League North	21	1	2	0	—		1	0	24	1
Boston United (loan)	2024–25	National League	4	0	—		—		1 (Note: Appearance(s) in National League Cup)	0	5	0
Boston United (loan)	2025–26	National League	27	1	—		—		1	0	28	1
Barnet (loan)	2026–27	EFL League Two	14	1	1	0	1	0	1	0	17	1
Career total			108	7	3	0	2	0	17	0	130	7
