= EFL League One Player of the Month =

English sporting award

The EFL League One Player of the Month is an association football award that recognises the player adjudged the best for each month of the season in EFL League One, the third tier of English football. Originally named the Football League One Player of the Month award, it replaced the Second Division Player of the Month as League One replaced the Second Division in 2004, and in 2016, when the Football League rebranded itself as the English Football League (EFL), the award was renamed accordingly. From the 2010–11 season, the Football League was sponsored by nPower, so it was known as the nPower League One Player of the Month award. As of the 2013–14 season, the league has been sponsored by Skybet, so it is now the SkyBet Player of the Month award. The awards are designed and manufactured in the UK by bespoke awards company Gaudio Awards.

== List of winners ==
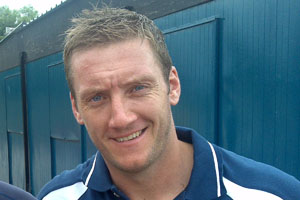
Steve Howard was the first recipient of League One Player of the Month

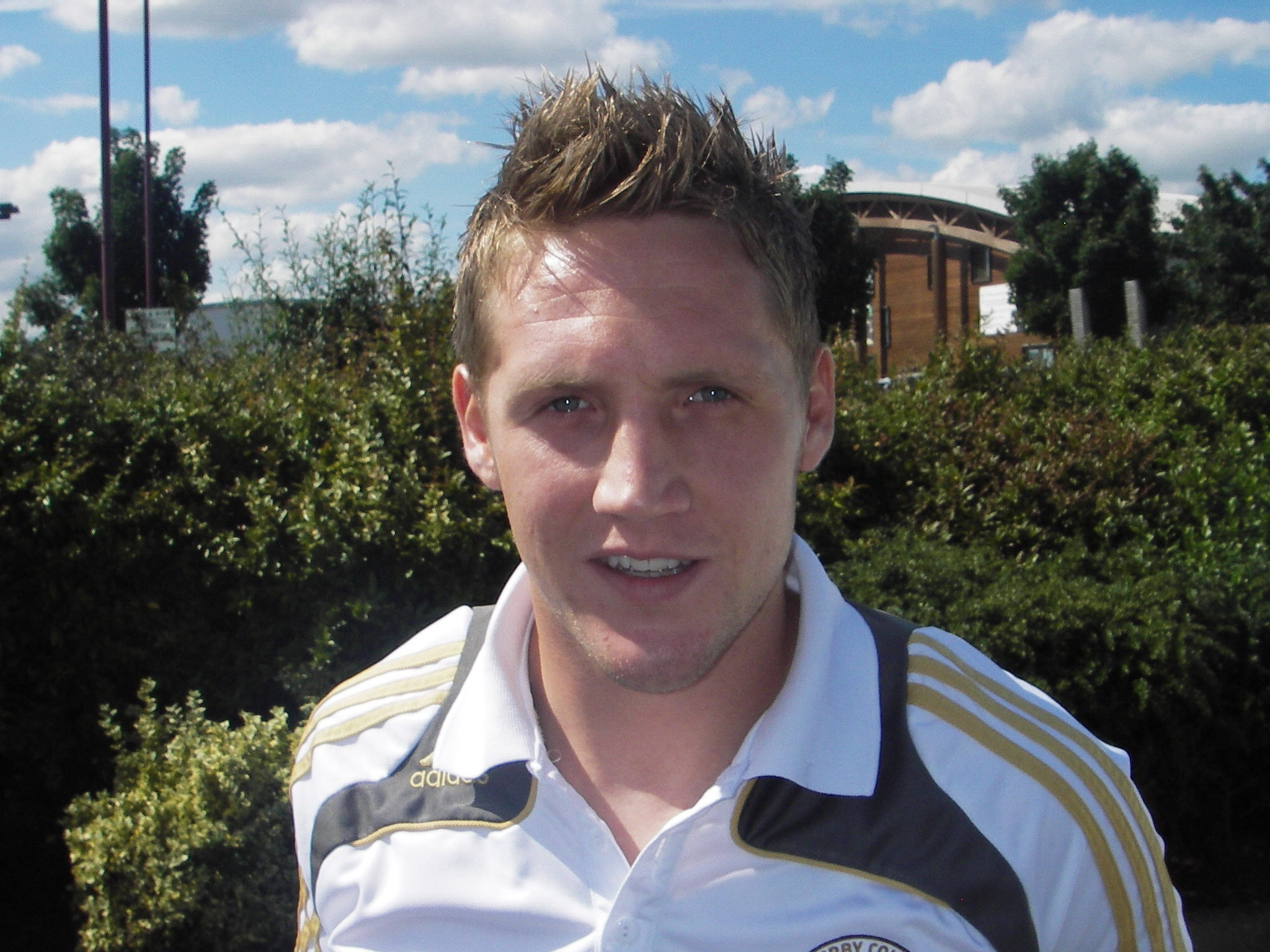
Kris Commons won in November 2006 and October 2007 with Nottingham Forest

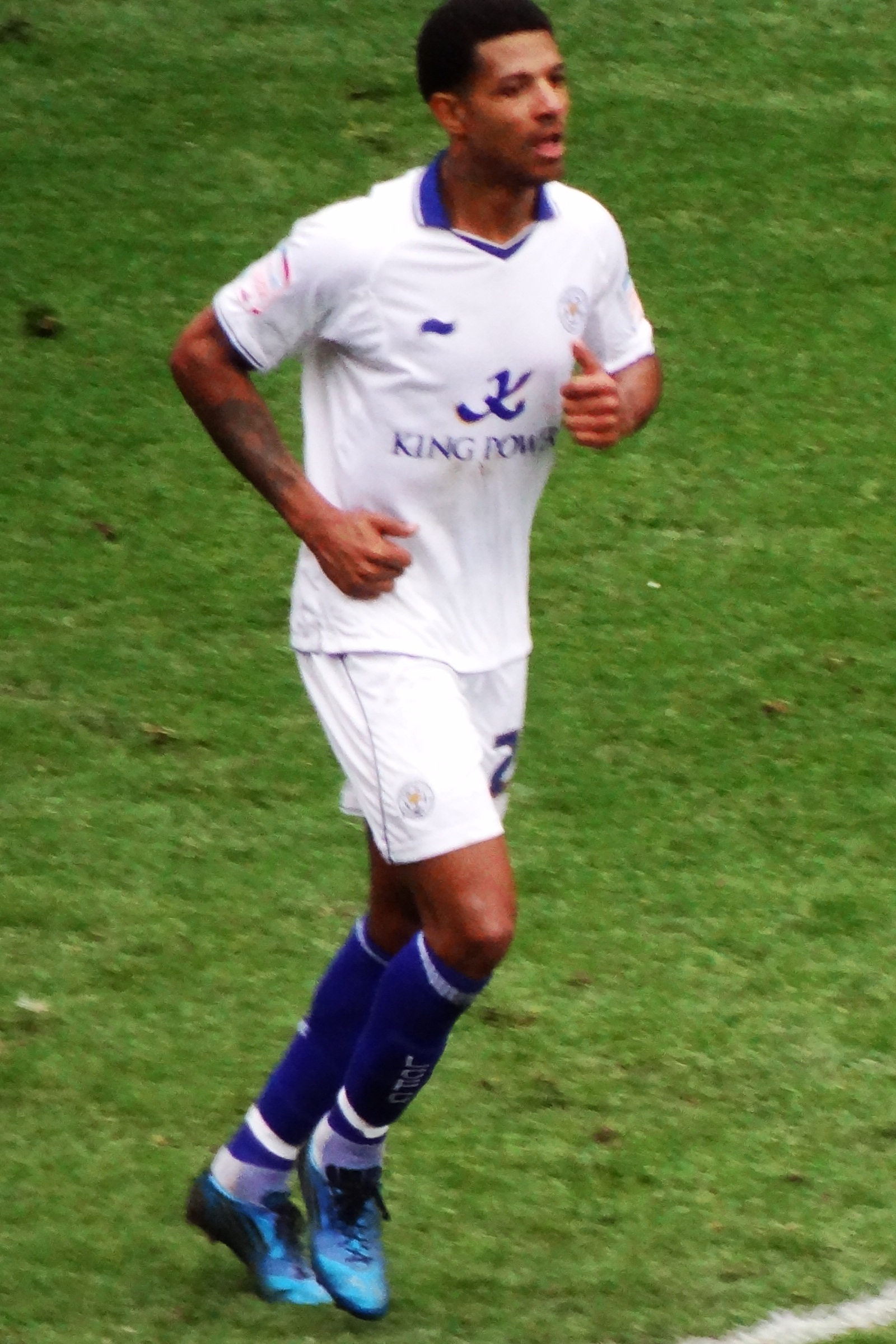
Jermaine Beckford twice won Player of the Month with Leeds United

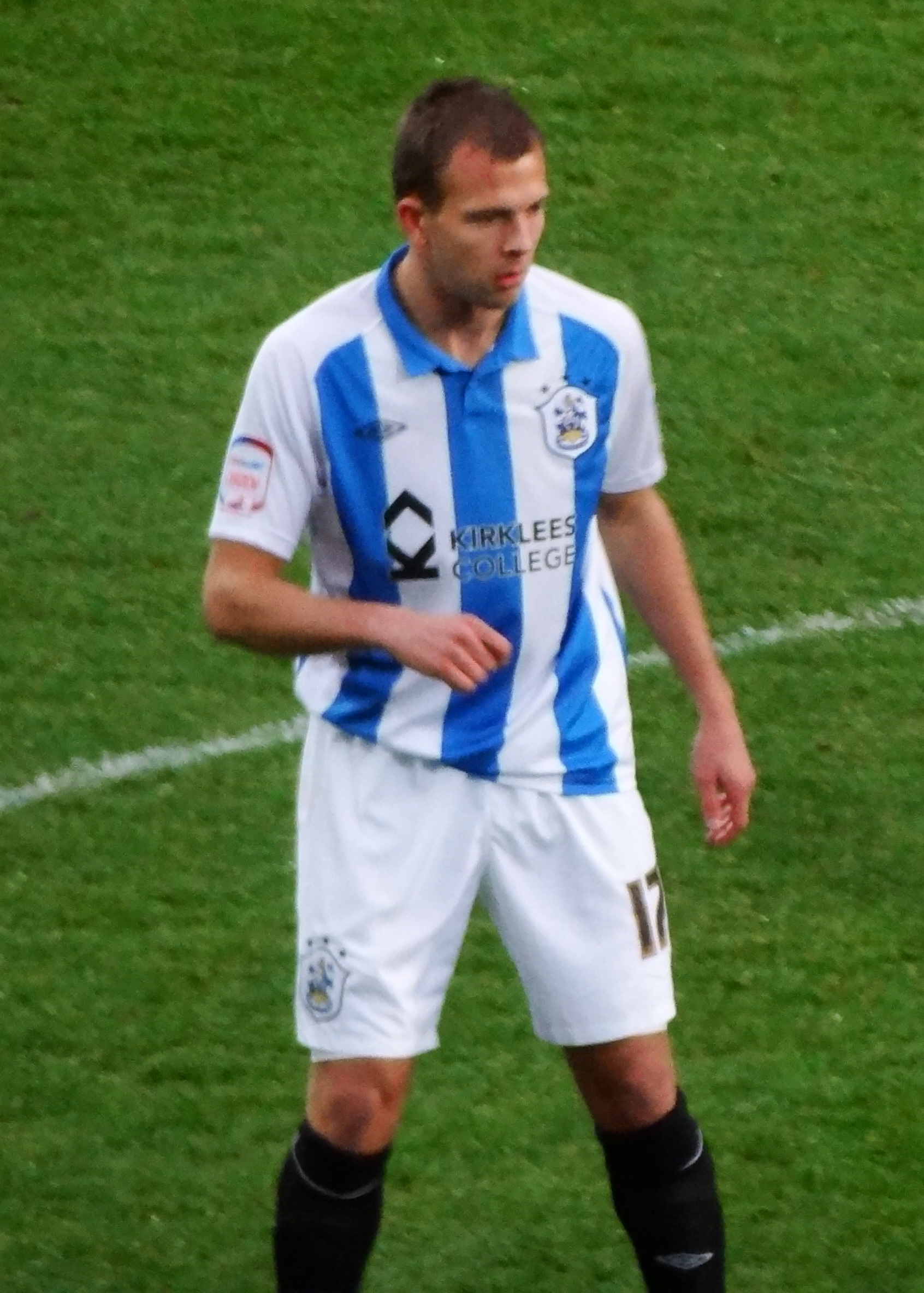
Jordan Rhodes was the recipient of the award in October and December 2011

- Each year in the table below is linked to the corresponding football season.

Month	Year	Nationality	Player	Team	Ref
August	2004	Scotland	Steve Howard	Luton Town	
September	2004	England	Rowan Vine	Luton Town	
October	2004	England	James Hayter	AFC Bournemouth	
November	2004	England	Curtis Davies	Luton Town	
December	2004	Northern Ireland	Stuart Elliott	Hull City	
January	2005	England	Adam Boyd	Hartlepool United	
February	2005	England	Sam Parkin	Swindon Town	
March	2005	Spain	Juan Ugarte	Wrexham	
April	2005	Australia	Chris Coyne	Luton Town	
August	2005	England	Dean Windass	Bradford City	
September	2005	England	Lee Trundle	Swansea City	
October	2005	England	Phil Jevons	Yeovil Town	
November	2005	England	Lee Trundle	Swansea City	
December	2005	Scotland	Michael McIndoe	Doncaster Rovers	
January	2006	England	DJ Campbell	Brentford	
February	2006	England	Jon Worthington	Huddersfield Town	
March	2006	Wales	Freddy Eastwood	Southend United	
April	2006	England	Ian Breckin	Nottingham Forest	
August	2006	England	Leon Constantine	Port Vale	
September	2006	England	Nicky Maynard	Crewe Alexandra	
October	2006	England	Billy Sharp	Scunthorpe United	
November	2006	Scotland	Kris Commons	Nottingham Forest	
December	2006	Ireland	Paul Heffernan	Doncaster Rovers	
January	2007	Nigeria	Enoch Showunmi	Bristol City	
February	2007	Ireland	Joe Murphy	Scunthorpe United	
March	2007	England	Akpo Sodje	Port Vale	
April	2007				
August	2007	England	Paul Furlong	Luton Town	
September	2007	Denmark	Casper Ankergren	Leeds United	
October	2007	Scotland	Kris Commons	Nottingham Forest	
November	2007	Trinidad and Tobago	Clayton Ince	Walsall	
December	2007	Trinidad and Tobago	Jason Scotland	Swansea City	
January	2008	Gambia	Edrissa Sonko	Walsall	
February	2008	England	Glenn Murray	Brighton & Hove Albion	
March	2008	Trinidad and Tobago	Jason Scotland	Swansea City	
April	2008	Scotland	Dougie Freedman	Leeds United	
August	2008	England	Danny Graham	Carlisle United	
September	2008	England	Jermaine Beckford	Leeds United	
October	2008	England	Rickie Lambert	Bristol Rovers	
November	2008	England	Dean Lewington	Milton Keynes Dons	
December	2008	England	Matty Fryatt	Leicester City	
January	2009	England	Matt Oakley	Leicester City	
February	2009	England	Aaron McLean	Peterborough United	
March	2009	Ireland	Simon Cox	Swindon Town	
April	2009	Ghana	Lloyd Owusu	Brighton & Hove Albion	
August	2009	England	Lloyd Sam	Charlton Athletic	
September	2009	England	Nicky Forster	Brighton & Hove Albion	
October	2009	England	Grant Holt	Norwich City	
November	2009	England	Robbie Williams	Huddersfield Town	
December	2009	England	Jermaine Beckford	Leeds United	
January	2010	England	Billy Paynter	Swindon Town	
February	2010	England	Neil Harris	Millwall	
March	2010	Wales	Steve Morison	Millwall	
April	2010	England	Michael Nelson	Norwich City	
August	2010	England	Giles Coke	Sheffield Wednesday	
September	2010	Denmark	Casper Ankergren	Brighton & Hove Albion	
October	2010	Ireland	Anthony Pilkington	Huddersfield Town	
November	2010	England	Johnnie Jackson	Charlton Athletic	
December	2010	England	Sam Collins	Hartlepool United	
January	2011	England	Paul Huntington	Yeovil Town	
February	2011	Scotland	Craig Mackail-Smith	Brighton & Hove Albion	
March	2011	Denmark	Casper Ankergren	Brighton & Hove Albion	
April	2011	England	Neil Mellor	Sheffield Wednesday	
August	2011	England	Ryan Lowe	Sheffield Wednesday	
September	2011	England	Neil Mellor	Preston North End	
October	2011	Scotland	Jordan Rhodes	Huddersfield Town	
November	2011	England	Michael Morrison	Charlton Athletic	
December	2011	Scotland	Jordan Rhodes	Huddersfield Town	
January	2012	England	Johnnie Jackson	Charlton Athletic	
February	2012	England	Dean Bowditch	Milton Keynes Dons	
March	2012	Wales	Ched Evans	Sheffield United	
April	2012	Spain	Miguel Llera	Sheffield Wednesday	
August	2012	England	Andy Robinson	Tranmere Rovers	
September	2012	Wales	Jake Cassidy	Tranmere Rovers	
October	2012	England	George Long	Sheffield United	
November	2012	Jamaica	Kevin Lisbie	Leyton Orient	
December	2012	England	David McGoldrick	Coventry City	
January	2013	Ireland	Paddy Madden	Yeovil Town	
February	2013	England	Peter Hartley	Hartlepool United	
March	2013	Jersey	Brett Pitman	AFC Bournemouth	
April	2013	England	Matt Smith	Oldham Athletic	
August	2013	Bermuda	Nahki Wells	Bradford City	
September	2013	Ireland	Dave Mooney	Leyton Orient	
October	2013	England	Patrick Bamford	Milton Keynes Dons	
November	2013	England	Ryan Lowe	Tranmere Rovers	
December	2013	England	Sam Saunders	Brentford	
January	2014	England	Nicky Ajose	Peterborough United	
February	2014	England	Michael Jacobs	Wolverhampton Wanderers	
March	2014	England	Callum Wilson	Coventry City	
April	2014	England	Kieran Agard	Rotherham United	
August	2014	Ireland	Conor Hourihane	Barnsley	
September	2014	Ireland	Eoin Doyle	Chesterfield	
October	2014	Barbados	Jonathan Forte	Oldham Athletic	
November	2014	England	Carl Baker	Milton Keynes Dons	
December	2014	Northern Ireland	Rory McArdle	Bradford City	
January	2015	England	Dele Alli	Milton Keynes Dons	
February	2015	England	Izale McLeod	Crawley Town	
March	2015	England	Aden Flint	Bristol City	
April	2015	England	Jermaine Beckford	Preston North End	
August	2015	England	Adam Armstrong	Coventry City	
September	2015	Jersey	Peter Vincenti	Rochdale	
October	2015	Ireland	Aiden O'Brien	Millwall	
November	2015	England	Jacob Murphy	Coventry City	
December	2015	England	Andy Williams	Doncaster Rovers	
January	2016	England	Sam Winnall	Barnsley	
February	2016	England	Jordan Archer	Millwall	
March	2016	England	Sullay Kaikai	Shrewsbury Town	
April	2016	Northern Ireland	Will Grigg	Wigan Athletic	
August	2016	England	Josh Morris	Scunthorpe United	
September	2016	England	Josh Morris	Scunthorpe United	
October	2016	England	Zach Clough	Bolton Wanderers	
November	2016	Ireland	Jay O'Shea	Chesterfield	
December	2016	Northern Ireland	Matty Lund	Rochdale	
January	2017	England	James Vaughan	Bury	
February	2017	England	Billy Sharp	Sheffield United	
March	2017	Portugal	Filipe Morais	Bolton Wanderers	
April	2017	England	Leon Clarke	Sheffield United	
August	2017	England	Jack Marriott	Peterborough United	
September	2017	Jersey	Brett Pitman	Portsmouth	
October	2017	Ireland	Graham Carey	Plymouth Argyle	
November	2017	Scotland	Charlie Mulgrew	Blackburn Rovers	
December	2017	England	Dan Burn	Wigan Athletic	
January	2018	Ireland	John-Joe O'Toole	Northampton Town	
February	2018	England	Adam Armstrong	Blackburn Rovers	
March	2018	England	Chey Dunkley	Wigan Athletic	
April	2018	Northern Ireland	Will Grigg	Wigan Athletic	
August	2018	Scotland	Jason Cummings	Peterborough United	
September	2018	England	John Marquis	Doncaster Rovers	
October	2018	England	Freddie Ladapo	Plymouth Argyle	
November	2018	England	Elliot Lee	Luton Town	
December	2018	England	Ivan Toney	Peterborough United	
January	2019	Ireland	James Collins	Luton Town	
February	2019	Ireland	Aiden McGeady	Sunderland	
March	2019	England	Jonson Clarke-Harris	Bristol Rovers	
April	2019	England	Joe Pigott	AFC Wimbledon	
August	2019	England	Marcus Maddison	Peterborough United	
September	2019	England	Jonson Clarke-Harris	Bristol Rovers	
October	2019	England	Ian Henderson	Rochdale	
November	2019	Wales	Joe Jacobson	Wycombe Wanderers	
December	2019	England	Alex Gilbey	Milton Keynes Dons	
January	2020	England	Ivan Toney	Peterborough United	
February	2020	England	Matty Taylor	Oxford United	
September	2020	Spain	Madger Gomes	Doncaster Rovers	
October	2020	England	Ben Amos	Charlton Athletic	
November	2020	Northern Ireland	Callum Camps	Fleetwood Town	
December	2020	England	Owen Dale	Crewe Alexandra	
January	2021	Northern Ireland	Matty Lund	Rochdale	
February	2021	England	Jonson Clarke-Harris	Peterborough United	
March	2021	England	Vadaine Oliver	Gillingham	
April	2021	Northern Ireland	Josh Magennis	Hull City	
August	2021	England	Cole Stockton	Morecambe	
September	2021	England	Cole Stockton	Morecambe	
October	2021	England	Michael Smith	Rotherham United	
November	2021	England	Scott Twine	Milton Keynes Dons	
December	2021	England	Daniel Barlaser	Rotherham United	
January	2022	England	Michael Smith	Rotherham United	
February	2022	England	Alfie May	Cheltenham Town	
March	2022	Scotland	Barry Bannan	Sheffield Wednesday	
April	2022	England	Lee Gregory	Sheffield Wednesday	
August	2022	Scotland	Liam Palmer	Sheffield Wednesday	
September	2022	England	Morgan Whittaker	Plymouth Argyle	
October	2022	Wales	Aaron Collins	Bristol Rovers	
November	2022	England	Connor Ripley	Morecambe	
December	2022	England	Conor Chaplin	Ipswich Town	
January	2023	England	Luke Leahy	Shrewsbury Town	
February	2023	Ireland	David McGoldrick	Derby County	
March	2023	England	Alfie May	Cheltenham Town	
April	2023	England	Conor Chaplin	Ipswich Town	
August	2023	England	Charlie Wyke	Wigan Athletic	
September	2023	Jamaica	Greg Leigh	Oxford United	
October	2023	England	Alfie May	Charlton Athletic	
November	2023	England	Sam Hoskins	Northampton Town	
December	2023	England	Herbie Kane	Barnsley	
January	2024	Scotland	Chris Martin	Bristol Rovers	
February	2024	England	Adam Phillips	Barnsley	
March	2024	Wales	Joe Taylor	Lincoln City	
April	2024	Wales	Mark Harris	Oxford United	
August	2024	England	Louie Barry	Stockport County	
September	2024	Ghana	Kwame Poku	Peterborough United	
October	2024	Ghana	Kwame Poku	Peterborough United	
November	2024	England	Louie Barry	Stockport County	
December	2024	England	Miles Leaburn	Charlton Athletic	
January	2025	England	Rumarn Burrell	Burton Albion	
February	2025	England	Niall Ennis	Blackpool	
March	2025	England	Jovon Makama	Lincoln City	
April	2025	United States	Charlie Kelman	Leyton Orient	
August	2025	England	Owen Bailey	Doncaster Rovers	
September	2025	England	Josh Neufville	Bradford City	
October	2025	England	Amario Cozier-Duberry	Bolton Wanderers	
November	2025	Ireland	Aaron Connolly	Leyton Orient	
December	2025	England	Leo Castledine	Huddersfield Town	
January	2026	England	Dom Ballard	Leyton Orient	
February	2026	Ireland	David McGoldrick	Barnsley	
March	2026	Nigeria	Kelvin Ehibhatiomhan	Reading	
April	2026	Jamaica	Kasey Palmer	Luton Town	
August	2026	Jamaica	Jamal Lowe	Sheffield Wednesday	
September	2026	England	Jack Marriott	Reading	
October	2026	Wales	Aaron Collins	Milton Keynes Dons	

== Multiple winners ==
Up to and including the October 2026 award.

- The table lists all the players who have won more than once.

Rank	Player	Wins
1st	(Denmark) Casper Ankergren	3
1st	(Jamaica) Jermaine Beckford	3
1st	(Jamaica) Jonson Clarke-Harris	3
1st	(England) Alfie May	3
5th	(England) Adam Armstrong	2
5th	(England) Louie Barry	2
5th	(England) Conor Chaplin	2
5th	(Wales) Aaron Collins	2
5th	(Scotland) Kris Commons	2
5th	(Northern Ireland) Will Grigg	2
5th	(England) Johnnie Jackson	2
5th	(England) Ryan Lowe	2
5th	(Northern Ireland) Matty Lund	2
5th	(England) Jack Marriott	2
5th	(Republic of Ireland) David McGoldrick	2
5th	(England) Neil Mellor	2
5th	(England) Josh Morris	2
5th	(Jersey) Brett Pitman	2
5th	(Ghana) Kwame Poku	2
5th	(Scotland) Jordan Rhodes	2
5th	(Trinidad and Tobago) Jason Scotland	2
5th	(England) Billy Sharp	2
5th	(England) Michael Smith	2
5th	(England) Cole Stockton	2
5th	(England) Ivan Toney	2
5th	(England) Lee Trundle	2

== Awards won by nationality ==
Up to and including the October 2026 award.

Country	Wins
England	123
Ireland	17
Scotland	13
Wales	9
Northern Ireland	8
Jamaica	4
Denmark	3
Ghana	3
Jersey	3
Trinidad and Tobago	3
Spain	3
Nigeria	2
Australia	1
Barbados	1
Bermuda	1
Gambia	1
Portugal	1
United States	1

== Awards won by club ==
Up to and including the October 2026 award.

Club	Wins
Peterborough United	10
Luton Town	8
Milton Keynes Dons	8
Sheffield Wednesday	8
Brighton & Hove Albion	6
Charlton Athletic	6
Doncaster Rovers	6
Huddersfield Town	6
Barnsley	5
Bristol Rovers	5
Leyton Orient	5
Wigan Athletic	5
Bradford City	4
Coventry City	4
Leeds United	4
Millwall	4
Rochdale	4
Rotherham United	4
Scunthorpe United	4
Sheffield United	4
Swansea City	4
Bolton Wanderers	3
Hartlepool United	3
Morecambe	3
Nottingham Forest	3
Oxford United	3
Plymouth Argyle	3
Swindon Town	3
Tranmere Rovers	3
Yeovil Town	3
AFC Bournemouth	2
Blackburn Rovers	2
Brentford	2
Bristol City	2
Cheltenham Town	2
Chesterfield	2
Crewe Alexandra	2
Hull City	2
Ipswich Town	2
Leicester City	2
Lincoln City	2
Northampton Town	2
Norwich City	2
Oldham Athletic	2
Port Vale	2
Preston North End	2
Reading	2
Shrewsbury Town	2
Stockport County	2
Walsall	2
AFC Wimbledon	1
Blackpool	1
Burton Albion	1
Bury	1
Carlisle United	1
Charlton Athletic	1
Crawley Town	1
Derby County	1
Fleetwood Town	1
Gillingham	1
Portsmouth	1
Southend United	1
Sunderland	1
Wolverhampton Wanderers	1
Wycombe Wanderers	1
Wrexham	1

== See also ==
- Football League One Manager of the Month
- Football League Championship Player of the Month
- Football League Two Player of the Month
