= Lukas Jensen =

Danish footballer (born 1999)

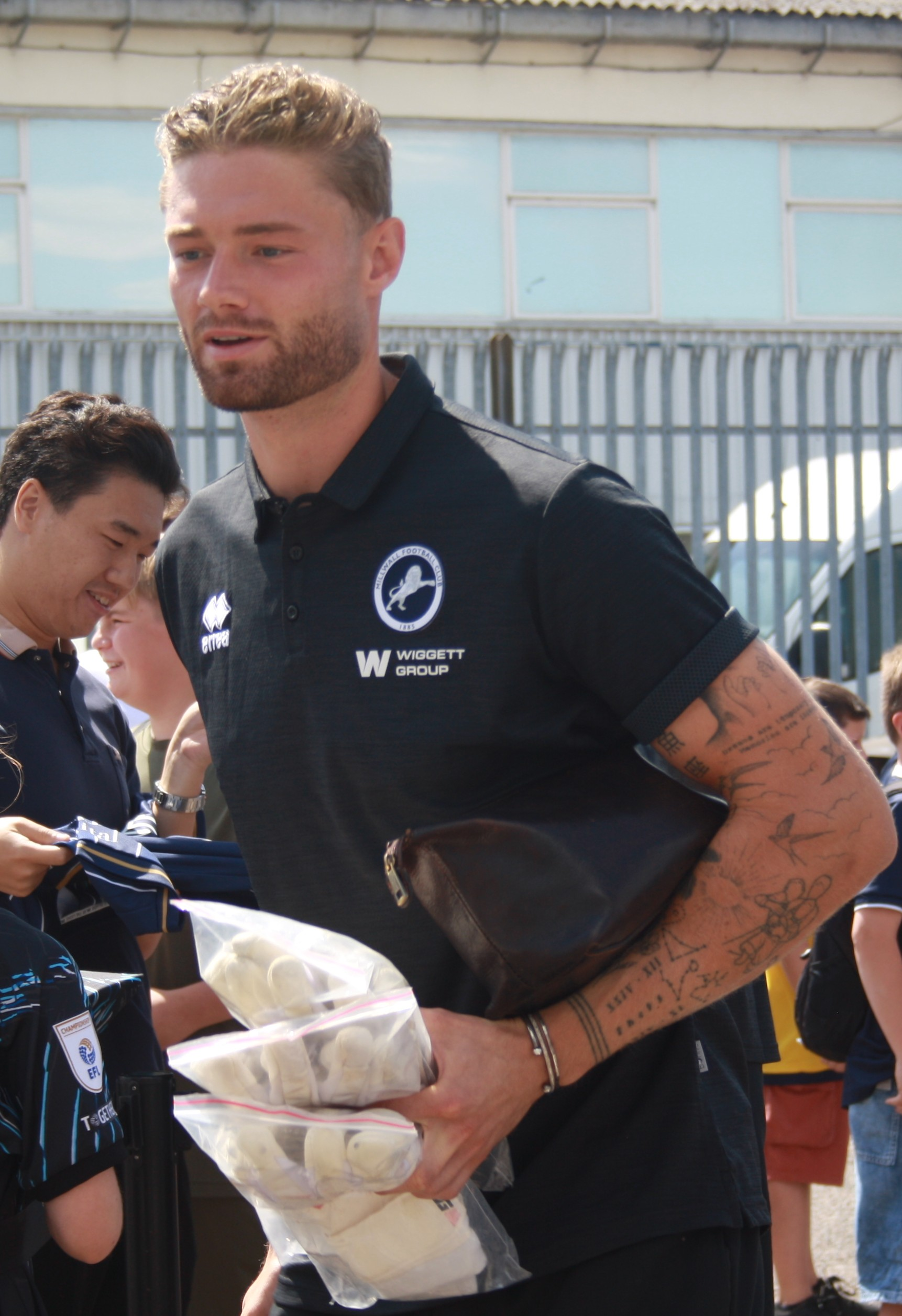
- Jensen in 2026

Personal information
- Full name: Lukas Bornhøft Jensen
- Date of birth: 18 March 1999 (age 27)
- Place of birth: Helsingør, Denmark
- Height: 1.98 m (6 ft 6 in)
- Position: Goalkeeper

Team information
- Current team: Millwall
- Number: 1

Youth career
- –2018: Helsingør

Senior career*
Years	Team	Apps	(Gls)
2018–2019	Helsingør	1	(0)
2019	HIK	6	(0)
2019–2023	Burnley	0	(0)
2021	→ Bolton Wanderers (loan)	0	(0)
2021	→ Kórdrengir (loan)	7	(0)
2021–2022	→ Carlisle United (loan)	1	(0)
2022–2023	→ Accrington Stanley (loan)	29	(0)
2023–2024	Lincoln City	45	(0)
2024–	Millwall	43	(0)
- * Club domestic league appearances and goals as of 09:18, 23 August 2026 (UTC)

Lukas Bornhøft Jensen (born 18 March 1999) is a Danish professional footballer who plays as a goalkeeper for EFL Championship club Millwall.

== Early life ==
Between the ages of 14 and 17 Jensen quit football and instead spent three years riding mountain bikes, taking part in the European Mountain Bike Championships and Scandinavian Mountain Bike Championships.

== Career ==
=== Burnley ===
In September 2019 he signed for Burnley following a successful trial. A broken elbow and international clearance delayed his Clarets debut for the under-23 side. He was rewarded with a new contract in January 2020 until the summer of 2021 with the option of a further year, after a string of impressive performances for the under-23 side. He made the bench for the first team on three occasions in June 2020 following the COVID-19 lockdown restart, after it was announced Joe Hart would be leaving the club on a free transfer.

On 1 February 2021, Jensen joined League Two side Bolton Wanderers on loan for the remainder of the 2020–21 season. He played no matches, spending the entire time as second choice behind Matt Gilks. Though he played no matches, he still considered the loan a success as he was able to experience being part of a promotion winning team.

On 14 May 2021, he joined Kórdrengir on loan for two months. He played seven times during this loan spell.

Jensen joined Carlisle United on season-long loan on 20 July 2021. He spent another loan as a back up goalkeeper, playing only four matches total.

Jensen joined Accrington Stanley on season-long loan on 28 June 2022. He was released by Burnley at the end of the 2022–23 season.

=== Lincoln City ===
On 19 June 2023, Jensen agreed to return to League One when he was announced to have signed for Lincoln City following his release from Burnley. On 5 August 2023, he made his Lincoln City debut starting against his former team Bolton Wanderers. He won the EFL Cup players of the second round, saving two penalties in a shootout against Sheffield United. He was given City's Player of the Season Award, following 19 clean sheets in the league during his debut season at the club.

=== Millwall ===
On 11 July 2024, Jensen signed for Millwall on a long-term contract for an undisclosed fee. He made his debut on 10 August against Watford, starting the game in a 3–2 defeat. On 8 August 2026, he saved all four of Queens Park Rangers's penalties in the shootout following a 1–1 draw in the first round of the EFL Cup.

== Career statistics ==
As of 22 August 2026

Appearances and goals by club, season and competition
Club	Season	League			National Cup		League Cup (Note: Includes EFL Cup)		Other		Total	
Club	Season	Division	Apps	Goals	Apps	Goals	Apps	Goals	Apps	Goals	Apps	Goals
Helsingør	2017–18	Danish Superliga	1	0	0	0	—		0	0	1	0
Helsingør	2018–19	Danish 1st Division	0	0	0	0	—		0	0	0	0
Helsingør	Total		1	0	0	0	—		0	0	1	0
HIK	2018–19	Danish 2nd Division	6	0	0	0	—		0	0	6	0
Burnley	2019–20	Premier League	0	0	0	0	0	0	—		0	0
Bolton Wanderers (loan)	2020–21	League Two	0	0	—		—		—		0	0
Kórdrengir (loan)	2021	1. deild karla	7	0	—		—		—		7	0
Carlisle United (loan)	2021–22	League Two	1	0	0	0	1	0	2 (Note: Appearances in the EFL Trophy)	0	4	0
Accrington Stanley (loan)	2022–23	League One	29	0	0	0	1	0	5	0	35	0
Lincoln City	2023–24	League One	45	0	1	0	3	0	1	0	50	0
Millwall	2024–25	Championship	41	0	2	0	0	0	—		43	0
Millwall	2025–26	Championship	0	0	0	0	0	0	—		0	0
Millwall	2026–27	Championship	2	0	0	0	1	0	—		3	0
Millwall	Total		43	0	2	0	1	0	0	0	46	0
Career total			132	0	3	0	6	0	8	0	146	0

== Honours ==
Individual

- Lincoln City Player of the Season: 2023–24
