= Timothy Eyoma =

English footballer (born 2000)

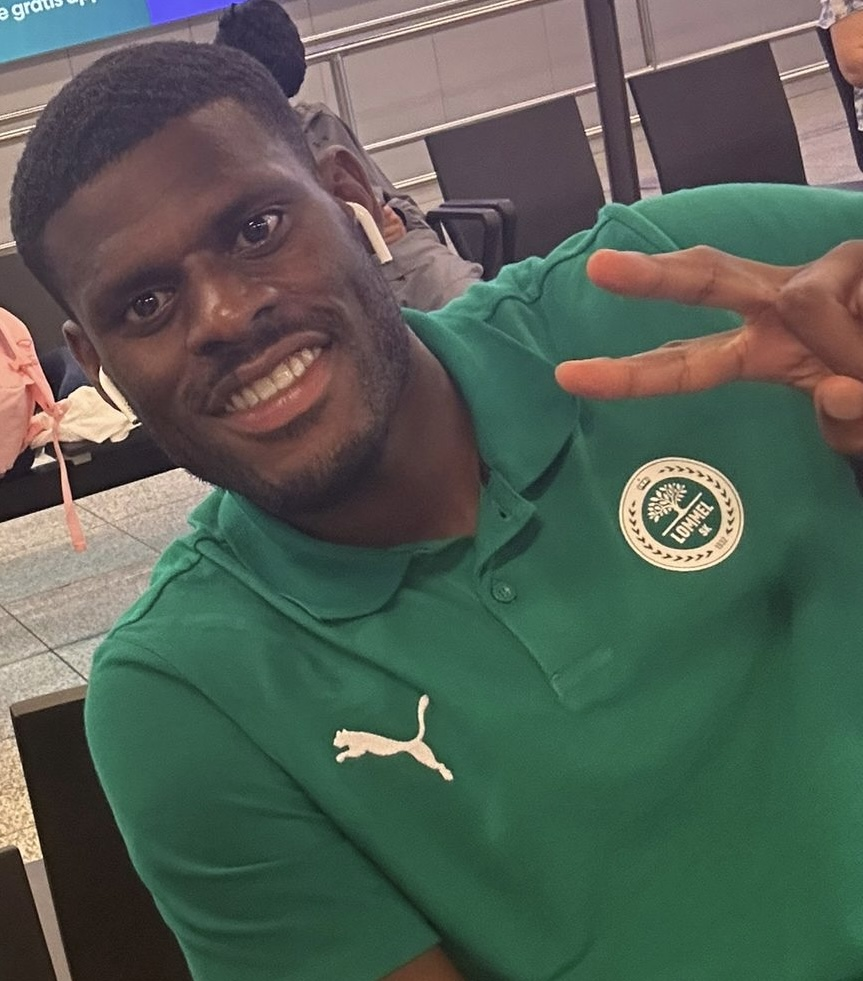
- Eyoma in 2025

Personal information
- Full name: Timothy Joel Eyoma
- Date of birth: 29 January 2000 (age 26)
- Place of birth: Hackney, England
- Height: 6 ft 0 in (1.83 m)
- Positions: Right-back; centre-back

Team information
- Current team: Lommel
- Number: 3

Youth career
- Crown & Manor
- 2015–2018: Tottenham Hotspur

Senior career*
Years	Team	Apps	(Gls)
2018–2021	Tottenham Hotspur	0	(0)
2020–2021	→ Lincoln City (loan)	39	(1)
2021–2024	Lincoln City	74	(4)
2024–2025	Northampton Town	24	(0)
2025–	Lommel	17	(1)

International career
2015–2016	England U16		
2016–2017	England U17	12	(1)
2017–2018	England U18	0	(0)
2018	England U19	6	(0)
Medal record
Men's football
Representing England
FIFA U-17 World Cup
Winner	2017 India
UEFA European Under-17 Championship
Runner-up	2017 Croatia
- * Club domestic league appearances and goals as of 20 April 2026

Timothy Joel "TJ" Eyoma (born 29 January 2000) is an English professional footballer who plays as a defender for Challenger Pro League club Lommel.

== Early and personal life ==
Eyoma was born on 29 January 2000, in Hackney, and attended Highbury Grove School. His brother Aaron Eyoma or "AJ" is also a footballer, who was previously at Arsenal and Derby County. Eyoma played youth football at Clissold Rangers and Islington-based club Crown & Manor.

== Club career ==
=== Early career ===
Described as comfortable at centre back and right back, in September 2018 Eyoma signed a professional contract with Spurs until 2021. On 4 January 2019, he was named as a substitute against Tranmere Rovers for the FA Cup match at Prenton Park and came on to make his first team debut.

=== Lincoln City ===
On 30 January 2020, Eyoma joined Lincoln City on loan until the end of the 2019–20 season. But due to the COVID-19 pandemic cutting short the season, he did not feature for the club and returned to Tottenham Hotspur without making an appearance. On 11 August 2020, Eyoma rejoined Lincoln City on a season-long loan until the end of the 2020–21 campaign. shortly after signing a new three-year contract with Tottenham. He made his Lincoln City debut against Crewe Alexandra in the EFL Cup on the opening day of the season. On 17 August 2021, it was announced by Lincoln City that Eyoma would rejoin the Imps for a third time, as a permanent signing for an undisclosed fee. He made his first appearance as a full-time Lincoln City player in the EFL Trophy against Manchester United U21. The club announced he would be released following the end of the 2023–24 season.

=== Northampton Town ===
On 1 November 2024, he joined League One side Northampton Town on a short-term deal. The following month this was extended to the end of the season. Following one season at Northampton Town, he was released at the end of the 2024–25 season.

=== Lommel ===
On 18 July 2025, Eyoma joined Belgian Challenger Pro League club Lommel on a two-year deal.

== International career ==
Born in England, Eyoma is of Nigerian descent. Eyoma was part of the England side that won the U17 World Cup in India.

== Career statistics ==
As of 26 April 2025

Appearances and goals by club, season and competition
Club	Season	League			National cup		League cup		Other		Total	
Club	Season	Division	Apps	Goals	Apps	Goals	Apps	Goals	Apps	Goals	Apps	Goals
Tottenham Hotspur	2017–18	Premier League	—		—		—		2 (Note: Appearance(s) in EFL Trophy)	0	2	0
Tottenham Hotspur	2018–19	Premier League	—		1	0	—		—		1	0
Tottenham Hotspur	2019–20	Premier League	—		—		—		3	0	3	0
Tottenham Hotspur	Total		0	0	1	0	0	0	5	0	6	0
Lincoln City (loan)	2019–20	League One	0	0	—		—		—		0	0
Lincoln City (loan)	2020–21	League One	39	1	1	0	3	0	10 (Note: Appearance(s) in League One Play-offs & Football League Trophy)	0	53	1
Lincoln City	2021–22	League One	23	1	1	0	0	0	4	0	28	1
Lincoln City	2022–23	League One	25	0	1	0	3	0	5	0	34	0
Lincoln City	2023–24	League One	26	3	1	0	2	0	4	0	33	3
Lincoln City	Total		74	4	3	0	5	0	13	0	95	4
Northampton Town	2024–25	League One	24	0	1	0	0	0	2	1	27	1
Career total			137	5	6	0	8	0	31	1	181	6

== Honours ==
England U17

- FIFA U-17 World Cup: 2017
- UEFA European Under-17 Championship runner-up: 2017
