= Teddy Bishop =

English footballer

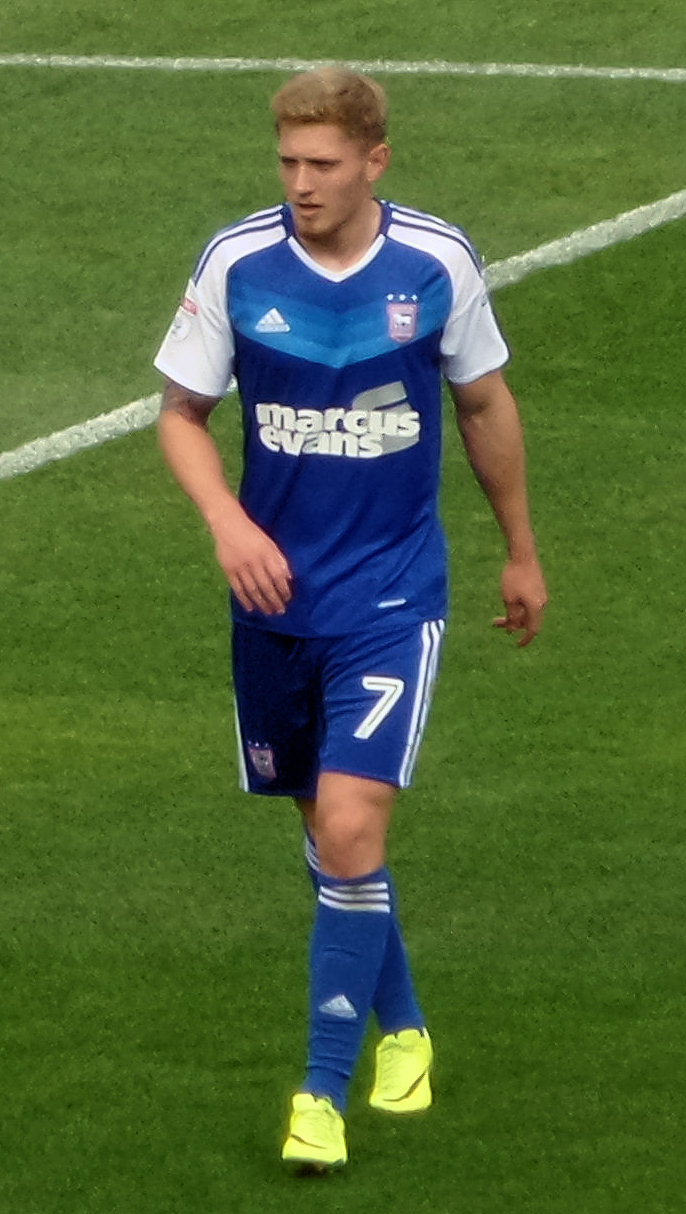
- Bishop playing for Ipswich Town in 2016

Personal information
- Full name: Edward James Bishop
- Date of birth: 15 July 1996 (age 30)
- Place of birth: Cambridge, England
- Height: 5 ft 10 in (1.78 m)
- Position: Central midfielder

Team information
- Current team: Colchester United
- Number: 8

Youth career
- 2004–2014: Ipswich Town

Senior career*
Years	Team	Apps	(Gls)
2014–2021	Ipswich Town	123	(5)
2021–2024	Lincoln City	93	(11)
2024–	Colchester United	49	(1)
- * Club domestic league appearances and goals as of 26 January 2026 (UTC)

Edward James Bishop (born 15 July 1996) is an English professional footballer who plays as a central midfielder for EFL League Two club Colchester United.

== Club career ==
=== Ipswich Town ===
Bishop was born in Cambridge, Cambridgeshire. He originally played for boyhood side Whittlesford Warriors before starting his career as part of the Ipswich Town academy system with the under-8s. He signed his first professional contract with Ipswich in May 2014, signing a one-year contract. On 12 August 2014, Bishop made his first-team debut for Ipswich Town in the first round of the League Cup against Crawley Town. He came on as a 77th-minute substitute for Kévin Bru in a match which Ipswich Town lost 1–0 after extra-time. On 30 August 2014, Bishop made his league debut in a 1–1 draw against Derby County. On 11 September 2014, Bishop signed a two-year extension to his Ipswich Town contract. Bishop became a regular in the Ipswich Town team, attracting praise from his manager Mick McCarthy, as well as former Ipswich Town player Mick Mills. Bishop scored his first goal for Ipswich against Bournemouth in a 2–2 draw on 22 November. In February 2015, Bishop signed a new contract with Ipswich, signing a three-year deal with the option of an additional year extension. He scored once and provided seven assists in 36 appearances during his first senior season, helping Ipswich reach the Championship play-offs.

Bishop suffered a shin splint injury in the build-up to the 2015–16 season and then a hamstring injury when he was edging close to a first-team return. On 6 January 2016 manager Mick McCarthy said of the promising midfielder "It's really difficult for him, it's really difficult for Bish as a young kid because he wants to be playing and footballers are never happy except when they're playing. You get in a bit of a low when you're injured for such a long time and you can't see an end to it. However, when he returns, it will be fantastic." Bishop did not make an appearance until the 5 April when he came off the bench in 0–0 draw with Charlton Athletic. He made 4 appearances during the remainder of the season, assisting the winning goal in a 0–1 away win over Derby County on the final day of the season.

He started the opening game of the 2016–17 season in a 4–2 home win against Barnsley at Portman Road. Bishop continued to feature regularly during the first half of the season. He suffered an ankle ligament injury in December, ruling him out of action for up to four weeks. He returned to the first-team on 4 February, featuring as a substitute in a 2–2 draw with Reading. He made 20 appearances during the 2016–17 season.

Bishop again struggled for fitness during the 2017–18 season. He made his first appearance of the season as a substitute in a 0–2 away loss to Aston Villa on 25 November. He only played four times during the first half of the season, before rupturing his hamstring in a match against Queens Park Rangers on Boxing Day, ruling him out of action for the rest of the season. In April 2018, Ipswich took up the option to extend Bishop's contract by a further year.

After recovering from the hamstring injury suffered in December 2017, Bishop made his return to the first-team as a substitute in a EFL Cup tie against Exeter City on 14 August. He did not make a league appearance until 23 November, when he featured as a second-half substitute in a 1–2 loss to West Bromwich Albion. On 9 February 2019, Bishop signed a new two-year contract with Ipswich Town, keeping him at the club until 2021, with the option of a further year. He managed to feature more regularly during the 2018–19 season, making 20 appearances in all competitions, 13 of which were starts, the most starts Bishop had managed since his debut season in 2014–15.

Bishop suffered a knee injury during the 2019 pre-season, ruling him out of action for three months. He did not feature in the league until New Year's Day 2020 when he came off the bench in a 1–1 draw with Wycombe Wanderers. He made 10 appearances during the remainder of the 2019–20 season, before it was suspended due to the outbreak of the COVID-19 pandemic.

He started in the opening match of the 2020–21 season in an EFL Cup first round tie against Bristol Rovers, assisting Freddie Sears' second goal as Ipswich won 3–0. Bishop scored his first goal since November 2014 in the first league match of the season, netting the opening goal in a 2–0 home win against Wigan Athletic at Portman Road. He made his 100th appearance for Ipswich in a 1–1 draw with Milton Keynes Dons on 3 October. His goal scoring form continued during the early stages of the season, scoring 4 goals and providing two assists in the opening 14 games of the season, including scoring a late winner with a long range shot from outside the box in a 1–0 home win over Gillingham on 27 October. On 21 November, Bishop picked up an ankle injury in a match against Shrewsbury Town, ruling him out for a few weeks. He returned from injury on 16 January 2021, making his 100th league appearance for Ipswich in a 1–0 away win against Burton Albion.

On 10 May 2021, Ipswich announced that Bishop had triggered a clause to extend his contract by an additional year, keeping him under contract until 2022.

=== Lincoln City ===
On 27 July 2021, Bishop joined Lincoln City for an undisclosed fee. This ended his 17-year association with Ipswich. He made his Lincoln City debut coming off the bench on the opening day of the season against Gillingham. He made his first start against Shrewsbury Town in the EFL Cup a few days later, where he scored his first goal for the club, a stunning goal from outside the area.

Following the end of the 2023–24 season the club confirmed that they were negotiating a new deal with him. On 27 June 2024, manager Michael Skubala admitted that Bishop was likely to leave the club following a break-down in negotiations over a new contract.

=== Colchester United ===
On 7 August 2024, Bishop signed for Colchester United on a two-year deal. On 16 May 2026 the club announced it had extended the player's contract.

== International career ==
On 17 March 2015, Bishop received his first call-up for England at youth level after being named in the England U19 squad for the elite round of European Under-19 Championship qualifiers. However, he withdrew from the squad due to injury.

== Career statistics ==
As of match played 3 May 2025

Appearances and goals by club, season and competition
Club	Season	League			FA Cup		League Cup		Other		Total	
Club	Season	Division	Apps	Goals	Apps	Goals	Apps	Goals	Apps	Goals	Apps	Goals
Ipswich Town	2014–15	Championship	33	1	0	0	1	0	2 (Note: Appearances in Championship play-offs)	0	36	1
Ipswich Town	2015–16	Championship	4	0	0	0	0	0	—		4	0
Ipswich Town	2016–17	Championship	19	0	0	0	1	0	—		20	0
Ipswich Town	2017–18	Championship	4	0	0	0	0	0	—		4	0
Ipswich Town	2018–19	Championship	18	0	1	0	1	0	—		20	0
Ipswich Town	2019–20	League One	9	0	0	0	0	0	1 (Note: Appearance in EFL Trophy)	0	10	0
Ipswich Town	2020–21	League One	36	4	0	0	1	0	1	0	38	4
Ipswich Town	Total		123	5	1	0	4	0	4	0	132	5
Lincoln City	2021–22	League One	36	4	2	0	1	1	3	1	42	5
Lincoln City	2022–23	League One	24	3	1	0	3	1	3	2	31	6
Lincoln City	2023–24	League One	33	4	0	0	2	0	3	0	38	4
Lincoln City	Total		93	11	3	0	6	2	9	2	111	15
Colchester United	2024–25	League Two	27	1	0	0	1	0	2	0	30	1
Career total			243	17	4	0	11	2	15	2	272	21

== Honours ==
Individual

- Ipswich Town Young Player of the Year: 2014–15
