= Jovon Makama =

English footballer (born 2004)

Personal information
- Full name: Jovon Willesley Makama
- Date of birth: 1 February 2004 (age 22)
- Place of birth: Long Eaton, England
- Height: 6 ft 5 in (1.95 m)
- Position: Forward

Team information
- Current team: Norwich City
- Number: 24

Youth career
- –2020: Derby County
- 2020–2021: Lincoln City

Senior career*
Years	Team	Apps	(Gls)
2021–2025	Lincoln City	79	(9)
2021–2022	→ Gainsborough Trinity (loan)	23	(8)
2022–2023	→ Brackley Town (loan)	5	(0)
2025–	Norwich City	38	(13)

International career^{‡}
2026–	England U21	2	(0)
- * Club domestic league appearances and goals as of 14:42, 7 November 2026 (UTC) ‡ National team caps and goals as of 22:31, 16 November 2026 (UTC)

Jovon Willesley Makama (born 1 February 2004) is an English professional footballer who plays as a forward for EFL Championship club Norwich City.

== Club career ==
=== Lincoln City ===
Makama signed his first professional contract with Lincoln City on 17 May 2021. Following his season at Gainsborough Trinity he committed his long-term future to Lincoln. He made his Lincoln City debut against Doncaster Rovers in the EFL Cup on 9 August 2022. His first Lincoln goal was scored during his Brackley loan spell, playing against Barnsley in the EFL Trophy on 30 August 2022.

In October 2024, Makama committed his future to the Imps by signing a new three-year deal. He switched to a wide right position in March 2025, which saw him named EFL League One Player of the Month and EFL Young Player of the Month after scoring five goals and getting three assists, including his first professional hat-trick against Bristol Rovers. He missed the final five games of the season with a hamstring injury. He was voted the clubs Young Player of the Season following the final game of the season.

==== Loans ====
On 11 August 2021, Makama joined Gainsborough Trinity on loan with Lincoln City teammate Hayden Cann for the season.

On 12 August 2022, he joined Brackley Town on loan for the season. He was recalled from his loan on 4 January 2023.

=== Norwich City ===
An hour before the opening day of the 2025–26 season, Lincoln confirmed they had accepted a bid from an unnamed Championship club and that Makama would be left out of the match day squad. On 4 August 2025, Makama joined Norwich City on a three-year contract with a two-year option for a fee of £1.2 million, which was a club record fee for Lincoln City. He made his debut on the opening day of the Championship season, coming off the bench in a 2–1 home defeat against Millwall. His first Norwich City goal was at home against Wrexham, scoring a consolation goal in a 3–2 home defeat. On 11 January 2026, Makama scored his first hat-trick for the club in a FA Cup third-round tie against Walsall at Carrow Road. He was nominated for the EFL Championship Player of the Month for December after scoring four times. In February, he limped off after the game against Blackburn Rovers, with head coach Philippe Clement confirming he broke a bone in his foot and will probably be out until the end of the season.

== International career ==
In November 2026, Makama was called up by England under-21s. On 13 November he made his debut off the bench as a substitute during a defeat against Portugal at Ashton Gate.

== Career statistics ==
As of match played 7 November 2026

Appearances and goals by club, season and competition
Club	Season	League			FA Cup		League Cup		Other		Total	
Club	Season	Division	Apps	Goals	Apps	Goals	Apps	Goals	Apps	Goals	Apps	Goals
Lincoln City	2022–23	League One	8	0	0	0	1	0	3 (Note: Appearance(s) in EFL Trophy)	1	12	1
Lincoln City	2023–24	League One	33	2	1	0	2	0	4	1	40	3
Lincoln City	2024–25	League One	38	7	3	3	1	1	3	0	45	11
Lincoln City	Total		79	9	4	3	4	1	10	2	97	15
Gainsborough Trinity (loan)	2021–22	Northern Premier League	23	8	0	0	—		1	0	24	8
Brackley Town (loan)	2022–23	National League North	5	0	0	0	—		0	0	5	0
Norwich City	2025–26	Championship	28	10	1	3	2	0	—		31	13
Norwich City	2026–27	Championship	10	3	0	0	0	0	—		10	3
Norwich City	Total		38	13	1	3	2	0	0	0	41	16
Career total			145	30	5	6	6	1	11	2	167	39

== Honours ==
Individual

- EFL League One Player of the Month: March 2025
- EFL Young Player of the Month: March 2025
