= Joe Taylor (footballer, born 2002) =

Welsh footballer

Personal information
- Full name: Joseph William John Taylor
- Date of birth: 18 November 2002 (age 24)
- Place of birth: Peterborough, England
- Height: 1.70 m (5 ft 7 in)
- Position: Forward

Team information
- Current team: Huddersfield Town
- Number: 9

Youth career
- Norwich City
- King's Lynn Town

Senior career*
Years	Team	Apps	(Gls)
2021	King's Lynn Town	1	(0)
2021	→ Wroxham (loan)	11	(20)
2021–2023	Peterborough United	12	(0)
2023–2025	Luton Town	18	(0)
2023–2024	→ Colchester United (loan)	25	(11)
2024	→ Lincoln City (loan)	19	(10)
2025–	Huddersfield Town	47	(16)
2026	→ Wigan Athletic (loan)	21	(11)

International career^{‡}
2022–2023	Wales U21	3	(1)
- * Club domestic league appearances and goals as of 11:51, 30 June 2026 (UTC) ‡ National team caps and goals as of 11:22, 20 November 2023 (UTC)

Joseph William John Taylor (born 18 November 2002) is a professional footballer who plays as a forward for EFL League One club Huddersfield Town.

== Club career ==
=== King's Lynn Town ===
Taylor began his career in the academy at Norwich City, before being released at the age of 15. Taylor signed for King's Lynn Town at the age of 16.

Taylor signed a one-year contract extension King's Lynn in December 2020. Taylor joined Eastern Counties League Premier Division club Wroxham on loan ahead of the 2021–22 season, making his debut on the opening day against Walsham-le-Willows. In his first home match, Taylor scored a hat-trick as his side thrashed Thetford Town 7–2. In October 2021, Taylor was recalled by King's Lynn after scoring 21 goals in just thirteen appearances and made his National League debut off of the bench in a 1–0 home defeat to Solihull Moors.

=== Peterborough United ===
On 15 November 2021, Taylor joined Championship club Peterborough United for an undisclosed fee on a two-and-a-half-year deal, initially joining up with the club's under-23 squad. In December 2021, it was reported that Taylor had been impressing in the under-23 squad and would begin training with the first-team. After scoring a hat-trick in a Premier League Cup quarter-final victory against Charlton Athletic, Taylor made his first-team debut four days later on 8 March 2022 in a 1–1 draw with second-placed AFC Bournemouth.

He scored his first goal for Peterborough in an EFL Cup win over Plymouth Argyle on 10 August 2022.

=== Luton Town ===
On 31 January 2023, Taylor signed for Championship club Luton Town for an undisclosed fee.

On 5 August 2023, Taylor signed for League Two club Colchester United on a season-long loan. He was recalled from his loan on 8 January 2024.

On 9 January 2024, Taylor signed for League One club Lincoln City for the remainder of the season. He made his debut the following weekend in the 1–1 draw against Wycombe Wanderers. He scored his first goal against Exeter City on 17 February 2024 to secure a 1–0 win. He won the EFL League One Player of the Month and the EFL Young Player of the Month for March 2024, following 6 goals and an assist which included his first professional hat-trick in the 5–0 win over Bristol Rovers. He would win Lincoln City's Golden Boot, after scoring 10 goals in his 19 games for the club.

=== Huddersfield Town ===
On 10 January 2025, Taylor signed for League One club Huddersfield Town on a four-and-a-half year deal for an undisclosed fee. He scored on his debut in a draw away to Blackpool on 17 January 2025.

On 15 January 2026, Taylor signed for fellow League One club Wigan Athletic on loan until the end of the season. He scored his first goal in a draw away to Doncaster Rovers on 24 January 2026.

Taylor resumed his position as main striker with Huddersfield under new coach Martin Drury at the start of 2026/27 season scoring 5 goals from the first 4 league games.

== International career ==
Taylor is eligible for Wales through his grandmother.

In September 2022 Taylor made his debut for the Wales national under-21 football team in the starting line-up for the 2–0 friendly match defeat against Austria under-21.

In September 2026 he was called up to the senior Wales squad for the first time.

== Career statistics ==
As of end of 2025–26 season

Appearances and goals by club, season and competition
Club	Season	League			FA Cup		League Cup		Other		Total	
Club	Season	Division	Apps	Goals	Apps	Goals	Apps	Goals	Apps	Goals	Apps	Goals
King's Lynn Town	2021–22	National League	1	0	0	0	—		0	0	1	0
Wroxham (loan)	2021–22	Eastern Counties Premier Division	11	20	1	0	—		1 (Note: Appearance(s) in FA Vase)	1	13	21
Peterborough United	2021–22	Championship	4	0	0	0	0	0	0	0	4	0
Peterborough United	2022–23	League One	8	0	1	0	2	1	4 (Note: Appearance(s) in EFL Trophy)	0	15	1
Peterborough United	Total		24	20	2	0	2	1	5	1	33	22
Luton Town	2022–23	Championship	5	0	0	0	0	0	1 (Note: Appearances in Championship play-offs)	0	6	0
Luton Town	2023–24	Premier League	0	0	0	0	0	0	0	0	0	0
Luton Town	2024–25	Championship	13	0	0	0	0	0	0	0	13	0
Luton Town	Total		18	0	0	0	0	0	1	0	19	0
Colchester United (loan)	2023–24	League Two	25	11	1	0	1	1	0	0	27	12
Lincoln City (loan)	2023–24	League One	19	10	—		—		0	0	19	10
Huddersfield Town	2024–25	League One	15	2	0	0	0	0	0	0	15	2
Huddersfield Town	2025–26	League One	19	4	1	0	2	0	5	3	27	7
Huddersfield Town	Total		34	6	1	0	2	0	5	3	42	9
Wigan Athletic (loan)	2025–26	League One	21	11	1	0	—		—		22	11
Career total			140	58	5	0	5	2	11	4	162	64

== Honours ==
Luton Town

- EFL Championship play-offs: 2023

Individual

- EFL League One Player of the Month: March 2024
- EFL Young Player of the Month: March 2024
