= Sean Roughan =

Irish association footballer

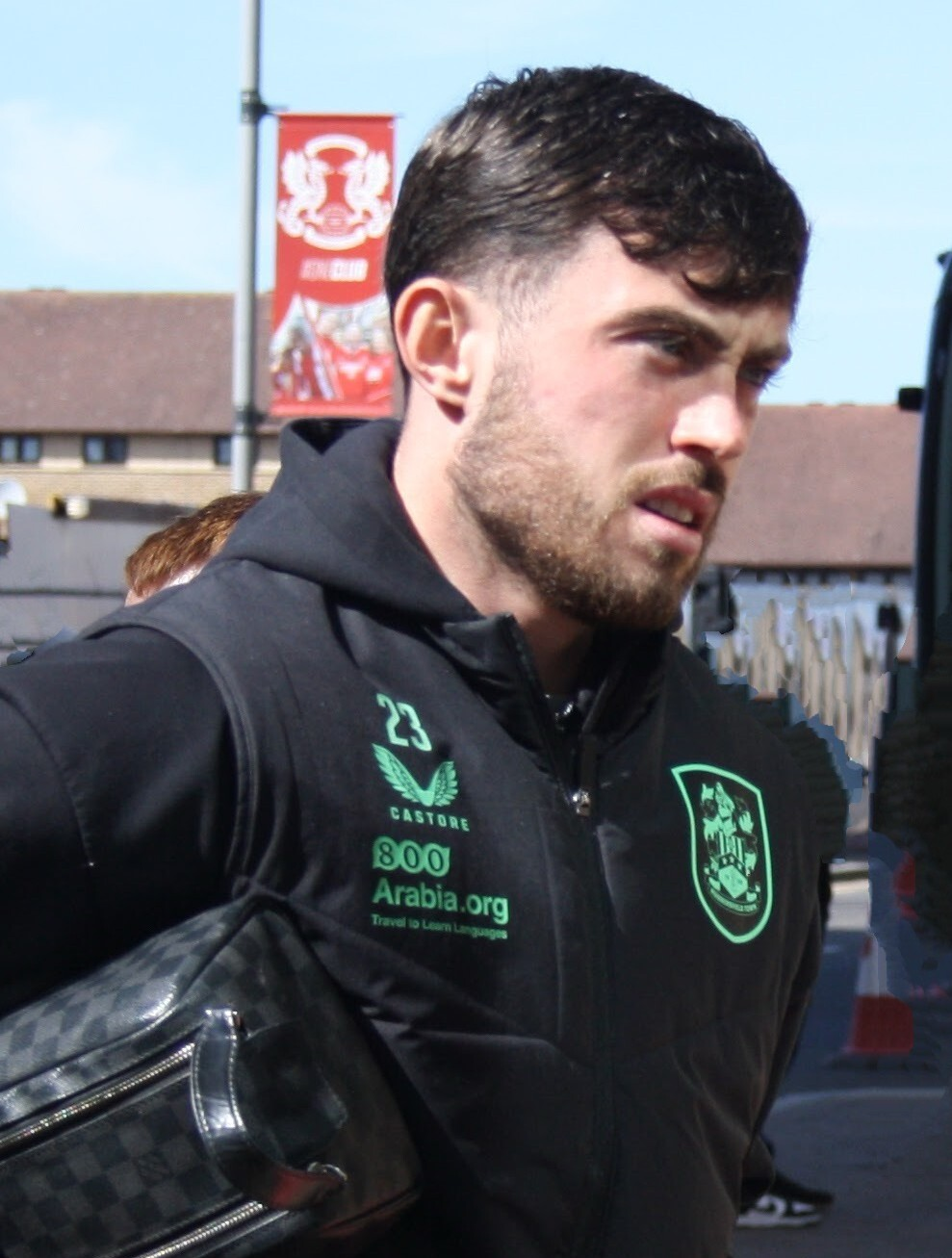
- Roughan in 2026

Personal information
- Full name: Sean Patrick Roughan
- Date of birth: 14 March 2003 (age 23)
- Place of birth: Swords, County Dublin, Ireland
- Height: 6 ft 1 in (1.85 m)
- Position: Defender

Team information
- Current team: Huddersfield Town
- Number: 23

Youth career
- 2010–2011: Swords Manor
- 2011–2015: Swords Celtic
- 2015–2016: Bohemian
- 2017–2018: Phoenix
- 2019: Shelbourne
- 2019–2020: Lincoln City

Senior career*
Years	Team	Apps	(Gls)
2020–2025	Lincoln City	123	(3)
2022	→ Drogheda United (loan)	15	(0)
2025–	Huddersfield Town	32	(0)

International career^{‡}
2020	Republic of Ireland U17	1	(0)
2021–2022	Republic of Ireland U19	4	(1)
2022–2024	Republic of Ireland U21	12	(2)
- * Club domestic league appearances and goals as of 16:13, 2 May 2026 (UTC) ‡ National team caps and goals as of 01:07, 16 October 2024 (UTC)

Sean Patrick Roughan (born 14 March 2003) is an Irish professional footballer who plays as a defender for EFL League One club Huddersfield Town.

== Club career ==
=== Lincoln City ===
He signed his first professional contract on 28 July 2020 following a successful spell in the Lincoln City academy. He would make his professional debut the following game starting the EFL Cup tie on 5 September 2020 against Crewe Alexandra . He then made his league debut for the Imps the following Saturday in a 2–0 home win against Oxford United. In May 2021, he was spotted on trial at Premier League clubs Southampton and Chelsea On 26 January 2022, he would join Drogheda United on loan for their upcoming 2022 season. An option was taken on his Lincoln City contract on 18 May 2022. He would return from his Drogheda United loan spelling following fifteen appearances.

He scored his first ever goal in the EFL Trophy against Everton U21 on 13 December 2022. On the 10 May 2023 it was confirmed that Lincoln City had offered him a new contract to stay at the club. It was confirmed he'd signed a new two–year contract on 30 June 2023. He was given the club's Young Player of the Year award at the end-of-season awards for the 2023–24 season. During the 2024–25 season, he played every minute of every game in League One and the FA Cup for Lincoln. Following the end of the 2024–25 season Roughan was offered a new contract from Lincoln City.

=== Huddersfield Town ===
On 10 June 2025, Huddersfield Town confirmed that Roughan would join them on 1 July 2025 following the end of his contract, signing a three-year deal for a compensation fee. He made his debut on the opening day of the season, starting against Leyton Orient, but an injury would see him replaced after 24 minutes.

== International career ==
He would be called up to the Republic of Ireland U21 team for the first time on 25 May 2021 to play in games against Switzerland, Denmark and Australia. On 16 November 2021, Roughan scored on his debut for the Republic of Ireland U19 team, a 2–0 win away to Bulgaria U19 in a 2022 UEFA European Under-19 Championship qualififier.

== Career statistics ==
As of 2 May 2026

Club	Season	League			National cup (Note: Includes FA Cup, FAI Cup)		League cup (Note: Includes EFL Cup)		Other		Total	
Club	Season	Division	Apps	Goals	Apps	Goals	Apps	Goals	Apps	Goals	Apps	Goals
Lincoln City	2020–21	League One	6	0	1	0	1	0	3 (Note: Appearance(s) in EFL Trophy)	0	11	0
Lincoln City	2021–22	League One	0	0	1	0	0	0	0	0	1	0
Lincoln City	2022–23	League One	32	1	1	0	4	0	3	1	40	2
Lincoln City	2023–24	League One	39	1	0	0	3	1	2	0	45	2
Lincoln City	2024–25	League One	46	1	3	0	0	0	3	0	52	1
Lincoln City	Total		123	3	6	0	8	1	11	1	149	5
Drogheda United (loan)	2022	League of Ireland Premier Division	15	0	0	0	–		–		15	0
Huddersfield Town	2025–26	League One	32	0	0	0	3	0	5	0	40	0
Career total			170	3	6	0	11	1	16	1	204	5
