= Jordan Wright (footballer) =

English footballer (born 1999)

Personal information
- Full name: Jordan Ian Wright
- Date of birth: 27 February 1999 (age 27)
- Place of birth: Stoke-on-Trent, England
- Height: 6 ft 3 in (1.90 m)
- Position: Goalkeeper

Team information
- Current team: Newport County
- Number: 1

Youth career
- –2016: Nottingham Forest

Senior career*
| Years | Team | Apps | (Gls) |
| 2016–2022 | Nottingham Forest | 0 | (0) |
| 2017 | → Alfreton Town (loan) | 1 | (0) |
| 2017 | → Kettering Town (loan) | | |
| 2018 | → Grantham Town (loan) | 9 | (0) |
| 2019 | → Nuneaton Borough (loan) | | |
| 2019–2020 | → Alfreton Town (loan) | 13 | (0) |
| 2021 | → Alloa Athletic (loan) | 0 | (0) |
| 2021 | → Hereford (loan) | 3 | (0) |
| 2022–2024 | Lincoln City | 20 | (0) |
| 2024–2025 | Grimsby Town | 34 | (0) |
| 2025– | Newport County | 51 | (0) |
- * Club domestic league appearances and goals as of 13:29, 22 November 2026 (UTC)

Jordan Ian Wright (born 27 February 1999) is an English professional footballer who plays as a goalkeeper for EFL League Two club Newport County.

== Career ==
=== Nottingham Forest ===
Born in Stoke-on-Trent, Wright began his career with Nottingham Forest, spending time on loan during the 2016–17 and 2017–18 seasons with Alfreton Town and Kettering Town. In November 2018 he signed for Grantham Town on loan, and in September 2019 he moved on loan to Nuneaton Borough.

He returned on loan to Alfreton Town in December 2019. The loan was extended in February 2020. He also moved on loan to Alloa Athletic in January 2021, and to Hereford in October 2021.

=== Lincoln City ===
He signed permanently for Lincoln City in January 2022, making his debut for the club on 5 March 2022, appearing as a late substitute following an injury to first-choice goalkeeper Josh Griffiths. Wright's performances impressed, although the club was searching for a replacement for Griffiths.

In September 2022 he was nominated for the EFL Cup Player of the Second Round, following his display against Barrow, saving three-penalties in a shootout and denying several attempts during the game. He signed a new 2-year deal, keeping him at Lincoln City until the summer of 2025 on 19 April 2023.

=== Grimsby Town ===
On 14 June 2024, Wright joined Grimsby Town on a two-year deal for an undisclosed fee. He made his first appearance for the club in Grimsby's first league match away to Fleetwood Town.

On 7 May 2025, Grimsby announced the player had been transfer listed.

=== Newport County ===
On 30 June 2025, Wright joined Newport County on a free transfer. He made his debut for Newport on 12 August 2025 in the starting line-up for the 1-0 EFL Cup first round defeat to Millwall.

== Career statistics ==
As of match played 21 November 2026

Appearances and goals by club, season and competition
| Club | Season | League | | | National cup | | League cup | | Other | | Total | |
| Club | Season | Division | Apps | Goals | Apps | Goals | Apps | Goals | Apps | Goals | Apps | Goals |
|---|---|---|---|---|---|---|---|---|---|---|---|---|
| Nottingham Forest | 2016–17 | Championship | 0 | 0 | 0 | 0 | 0 | 0 | 0 | 0 | 0 | 0 |
| Nottingham Forest | 2017–18 | Championship | 0 | 0 | 0 | 0 | 0 | 0 | 0 | 0 | 0 | 0 |
| Nottingham Forest | 2018–19 | Championship | 0 | 0 | 0 | 0 | 0 | 0 | 0 | 0 | 0 | 0 |
| Nottingham Forest | 2019–20 | Championship | 0 | 0 | 0 | 0 | 0 | 0 | 0 | 0 | 0 | 0 |
| Nottingham Forest | 2020–21 | Championship | 0 | 0 | 0 | 0 | 0 | 0 | 0 | 0 | 0 | 0 |
| Nottingham Forest | 2021–22 | Championship | 0 | 0 | 0 | 0 | 0 | 0 | 0 | 0 | 0 | 0 |
| Nottingham Forest | Total | | 0 | 0 | 0 | 0 | 0 | 0 | 0 | 0 | 0 | 0 |
| Alfreton Town (loan) | 2016–17 | National League North | 1 | 0 | 0 | 0 | 0 | 0 | 0 | 0 | 1 | 0 |
| Alfreton Town (loan) | 2019–20 | National League North | 13 | 0 | 0 | 0 | 0 | 0 | 0 | 0 | 13 | 0 |
| Alloa Athletic (loan) | 2020–21 | Scottish Championship | 0 | 0 | 0 | 0 | 0 | 0 | 0 | 0 | 0 | 0 |
| Hereford (loan) | 2021–22 | National League North | 3 | 0 | 1 | 0 | 0 | 0 | 0 | 0 | 4 | 0 |
| Lincoln City | 2021–22 | League One | 13 | 0 | 0 | 0 | 0 | 0 | 0 | 0 | 13 | 0 |
| Lincoln City | 2022–23 | League One | 6 | 0 | 1 | 0 | 1 | 0 | 6 (Note: Appearance(s) in EFL Trophy) | 0 | 14 | 0 |
| Lincoln City | 2023–24 | League One | 1 | 0 | 0 | 0 | 0 | 0 | 3 | 0 | 4 | 0 |
| Lincoln City | Total | | 20 | 0 | 1 | 0 | 1 | 0 | 9 | 0 | 31 | 0 |
| Grimsby Town | 2024–25 | League Two | 34 | 0 | 1 | 0 | 0 | 0 | 2 | 0 | 37 | 0 |
| Newport County | 2025–26 | League Two | 35 | 0 | 1 | 0 | 1 | 0 | 2 | 0 | 39 | 0 |
| Newport County | 2026–27 | League Two | 16 | 0 | 1 | 0 | 1 | 0 | 0 | 0 | 18 | 0 |
| Newport County | Total | | 51 | 0 | 2 | 0 | 2 | 0 | 2 | 0 | 57 | 0 |
| Career total | | | 122 | 0 | 5 | 0 | 3 | 0 | 13 | 0 | 143 | 0 |
