= 2021–22 Lincoln City F.C. season =

Lincoln City
2021–22 season
- Chairman: Clive Nates
- Manager: Michael Appleton (until 30 April); Mark Kennedy (from 12 May)
- Stadium: LNER Stadium
- League One: 17th
- FA Cup: Second round (vs. Hartlepool United)
- EFL Cup: First round (vs. Shrewsbury Town)
- EFL Trophy: Second round (vs. Carlisle United)
- Top goalscorer: League: Anthony Scully (11 goals); All: Anthony Scully (15 goals)
- Highest home attendance: 10,346 (vs Sunderland; League One)
- Lowest home attendance: 3,060 (vs Sunderland; EFL Trophy)
- Average home league attendance: 8,773
- Biggest win: 5–1 (vs. Cambridge United; League One)
- Biggest defeat: 0–3 (vs. Portsmouth; League One)
Home colours	Away colours	Third colours

The 2021–22 Lincoln City F.C. season is the club's 138th season in their history and their third consecutive season in EFL League One. Along with League One, the club will also participate in the FA Cup, EFL Cup and EFL Trophy.

The season covers the period from 1 July 2021 to 30 June 2022.

== Season overview ==
=== May ===
On 28 May, they announced their home shirt for the 2021–22 season, confirming that the shirt would feature five sponsors across the season.

=== June ===
On 17 June, during the off-season, Harvey Jabara became a nine percent shareholder in Lincoln City Holdings, investing an initial “high six-figure” sum into the Imps. As part of the development, former USA international Landon Donovan joined the Imps as a Strategic Advisor, working with the Board, to enhance the Clubs network and relationships, particularly within North America.

Also on 17 June, they announced their first of five shirt sponsors for the season, Virgin Wines.

On 25 June, it was confirmed that Ian Reeve would step down as a director and board member after six-years with the club.

Also on 25 June, it was confirmed that Craig Housley has joined the club as Head Groundsman.

=== July ===
On 6 July, Lincoln City announced their new group of First-Year Scholars, who include; Sam Green, Nathan Kabeya, Darryl Powell, Osei Boffah, Oisin Gallagher, Harry Dale, Theo Mussell, Kyrell Wheatley and Tayo Alexander-Tucker.

On 13 July, manager Michael Appleton announced that he would be taking a few weeks off following routine surgery, after he was diagnosed with testicular cancer a few weeks earlier.

On 30 July, the club announced their new away shirt for the 2021–22 season, with it being sponsored by SRP Hire Solutions.

=== August ===
On 3 August, the club announced a new brand partnership with EQVVS for the upcoming season.

On 4 August, the club announced their squad number for the 2021–22 season.

On 5 August, it was announced that Imps chief executive Liam Scully, had been appointed chair of the EFL Trust, officially taking up the role in September 2021.

On 25 August, the game against Rotherham United had to be rearranged due to international call ups.

On 26 August, Elicha Ahui joined the first-year scholars program.

=== September ===
On 17 September, ex-player Jack Hobbs would return to his first club on an assistant coaching role working with the academy's Shadow Scholarship programme.

On 18 September, it was confirmed that Virgin Wines would no longer be the shirt sponsor after the Ipswich Town game.

On 29 September, Light Source became the second of five home shirt sponsors for the season.

On 30 September, the game against Wigan Athletic was postponed due to international call ups.

=== October ===
On 1 October, the club launched their third kit for the season.

=== November ===
On 1 November, the game against Sunderland was postponed due to international call ups.

On 23 November, Buildbase became the third of five home shirt sponsors across the season.

=== December ===
On 14 December, it was confirmed that Chris Travers had returned to the clubs board.

On 16 December, their upcoming game against Doncaster Rovers was postponed due to an outbreak of COVID-19 at the visitors.

On 28 December, their upcoming game against Rotherham United was postponed due to an outbreak of COVID-19 inside the Imps squad.

On 30 December, their upcoming game against Ipswich Town was postponed due to the continuing outbreak of COVID-19 inside the Imps squad.

=== January ===
On 18 January, their rearranged game against Rotherham United was postponed due to a frozen pitch.

On 26 January, University of Lincoln became the fourth of five home shirt sponsors for the season.

On 27 January, the club published their annual accounts for the year ending June 2021.

=== February ===
On 19 January, the game against Fleetwood Town was cancelled due to snow on the pitch.

=== March ===
On 1 March, Richard Clarke stepped down as a director of the club.

On 15 March, Brooke Norton-Cuffy red card against AFC Wimbledon was successfully appealed and was available to play in their upcoming games.

On 17 March, Branston Ltd became the final of five home shirt sponsors for the season.

=== April ===
On 30 April, following their victory over Crewe Alexandra, it was announced that manager Michael Appleton would be leaving his role as manager.

=== May ===
On 5 May, Ross Burbeary was appointed as head of performance.

On 6 May, Shamrock Rovers manager Stephen Bradley announced he turned down an approach to be the next Lincoln City manager.

On 12 May, Mark Kennedy was appointed as the new head coach.

== Pre-season ==
On 18 June, Lincoln announced their pre-season schedule, confirming two games against Norwich City and Gainsborough Trinity and on 21 June 2021, Lincoln confirmed the remaining fixtures against, Reading, Nottingham Forest XI, Boston United, Scunthorpe United and Salford City. An additional friendly against Stockport County was announced on 27 July 2021.

10 July 2021 Friendly	Reading	1–0	Lincoln City	Sindlesham
13:00 BST	Camara 71'	Report		Stadium: Bearwood Park; Attendance: 0 (Played behind closed doors)

13 July 2021 Friendly	Nottingham Forest XI	2–1	Lincoln City	West Bridgford
14:00 BST	Barnes 64'; Taylor 90'	Report	Draper 76'	Stadium: Nigel Doughty Academy; Attendance: 0 (Played behind closed doors)

17 July 2021 Friendly	Boston United	5–0	Lincoln City XI	Boston
15:00 BST	J. Preston 10'; Elliot 14', 45'; Burrow 66'; Wright 90'		Wheatley (red card) 52'	Stadium: Jakemans Community Stadium; Attendance: 1,004; Referee: Kevin Friend

20 July 2021 Friendly	Norwich City	1–0	Lincoln City	Norwich
16:00 BST	Lees-Melou 88'	Report		Stadium: Lotus Training Centre; Attendance: 0 (Played behind closed doors)

21 July 2021 Friendly	Gainsborough Trinity	2–1	Lincoln City XI	Gainsborough
19:45 BST	Morrison 54'; Trialist 71'	Report	Wheatley 84'	Stadium: Gainsborough Martin & Co. Arena

27 July 2021 Friendly	Scunthorpe United	0–2	Lincoln City	Scunthorpe
19:30 BST		Report	McGrandles 2'; Bramall 51'	Stadium: The Sands Venue Stadium

31 July 2021 Friendly	Salford City	0–2	Lincoln City	Salford
15:00 BST		Report	Scully 4' (pen.); Hopper 67'	Stadium: Peninsula Stadium

3 August 2021 Friendly	Stockport County	2–0	Lincoln City XI	Carrington, Greater Manchester
16:00 BST	Collar 26'; Reid 65'	Report		Stadium: Carrington Training Ground; Attendance: 0 (Played behind closed doors)

== Competitions ==
=== League One ===
==== League table ====
Pos	Team	Pld	W	D	L	GF	GA	GD	Pts	Promotion, qualification or relegation
13	Charlton Athletic	46	17	8	21	55	59	−4	59	
14	Cambridge United	46	15	13	18	56	74	−18	58	
15	Cheltenham Town	46	13	17	16	66	80	−14	56	
16	Burton Albion	46	14	11	21	51	67	−16	53	
17	Lincoln City	46	14	10	22	55	63	−8	52	
18	Shrewsbury Town	46	12	14	20	47	51	−4	50	
19	Morecambe	46	10	12	24	57	88	−31	42	
20	Fleetwood Town	46	8	16	22	62	82	−20	40	
21	Gillingham (R)	46	8	16	22	35	69	−34	40	Relegation to EFL League Two

Source: EFL Official Website
Rules for classification: 1) Points; 2) Goal difference; 3) Number of goals scored; 4) Head-to-head results; 5) Wins; 6) Away goals; 7) Penalty points based on yellow and red cards received excluding the last four games of the season (sec 9.5); 8) 12-point sending off offences; 9) If the tie affects the automatic promotion or relegation places, a play-off game or games would be held between the two tied teams
(R) Relegated

==== Results summary ====
Overall								Home						Away					
Pld	W	D	L	GF	GA	GD	Pts	W	D	L	GF	GA	GD	W	D	L	GF	GA	GD
46	14	10	22	55	63	−8	52	7	5	11	25	29	−4	7	5	11	30	34	−4

Last updated: 30 April 2022.

==== Results by matchday ====
Matchday	1	2	3	4	5	6	7	8	9	10	11	12	13	14	15	16	17	18	19	20	21	22	23	24	25	26	27	28	29	30	31	32	33	34	35	36	37	38	39	40	41	42	43	44	45	46
Ground	A	H	H	A	A	A	H	H	A	A	H	H	H	A	A	H	A	H	H	A	A	H	H	A	H	A	H	A	H	H	H	A	H	H	A	A	A	H	A	A	A	H	A	H	A	H
Result	D	W	L	L	L	W	D	L	W	L	D	W	L	D	W	D	D	L	L	L	D	L	W	W	L	W	L	L	W	D	L	L	L	W	L	W	L	D	L	W	D	L	L	W	L	W
Position	15	8	13	17	20	16	15	16	17	17	16	13	15	15	12	12	16	16	18	18	18	20	19	16	18	16	18	18	17	17	17	17	18	18	18	16	18	18	18	18	18	18	18	18	18	17

Updated to match(es) played on 30 April 2022. Source:
A = Away; H = Home; W = Win; D = Draw; L = Loss

==== Matches ====
On Thursday, 24 June 2021, the EFL League One fixtures were revealed.

7 August 2021 1	Gillingham	1–1	Lincoln City	Gillingham
15:00 BST	Lloyd 44'; Phillips (yellow card) 63'; Tutonda (yellow card) 68' Steve Evans (yellow card)	Report	Edun 4', (yellow card) 17'; Bramall (yellow card) 6'	Stadium: Priestfield Stadium; Attendance: 5,486; Referee: Thomas Bramall

14 August 2021 2	Lincoln City	2–1	Fleetwood Town	Lincoln
15:00 BST	Melbourne (yellow card) 31'; Edun (yellow card) 64'; Scully 69', 87' (pen.); Bishop (yellow card) 75'	Report	Matete (yellow card) 7'; Andrew 32'; Clark (yellow card) 74'; Hill (yellow card) 86'	Stadium: LNER Stadium; Attendance: 8,241; Referee: James Oldham

17 August 2021 3	Lincoln City	0–1	Bolton Wanderers	Lincoln
19:45 BST	Jackson (yellow card) 71'	Report	Sarcevic 77'	Stadium: LNER Stadium; Attendance: 9,130; Referee: Sam Barrott

21 August 2021 4	Wycombe Wanderers	1–0	Lincoln City	High Wycombe
15:00 BST	Vokes 3', (yellow card) 39'; Thompson (yellow card) 37'; Grimmer (yellow card) 90+1'	Report	Bridcutt (yellow card) 59'	Stadium: Adams Park; Referee: James Bell

28 August 2021 5	Oxford United	3–1	Lincoln City	Oxford
15:00 BST	Henry 12', 24', 73' (pen.)	Report	Bridcutt (yellow card) 64'; Scully 87' (pen.)	Stadium: Kassam Stadium; Attendance: 7,045; Referee: Will Finnie

11 September 2021 6	Cambridge United	1–5	Lincoln City	Cambridge
15:00 BST	Williams (yellow card) 36'; Ironside 59'; Digby (yellow card) 72'; Knibbs (yellow card) 82'	Report	Adelakun 1'; McGrandles 16'; Scully 24', 72'; Fiorini 57'	Stadium: Abbey Stadium; Attendance: 5,833; Referee: Sam Purkiss

14 September 2021 7	Lincoln City	1–1	Rotherham United	Lincoln
19:45 BST	Fiorini 55'; Jackson (yellow card) 66'	Report	Smith 22', (yellow card) 56'; Mattock (yellow card) 71'	Stadium: LNER Stadium; Attendance: 8,788; Referee: Peter Wright

18 September 2021 8	Lincoln City	0–1	Ipswich Town	Lincoln
15:00 BST	Bishop (yellow card) 74'	Report	Bonne 30'; Burns (yellow card) 59'; Evans (yellow card) 83'	Stadium: LNER Stadium; Attendance: 9,874; Referee: Ben Speedie

25 September 2021 9	Burton Albion	1–2	Lincoln City	Burton upon Trent
15:00 BST	Bostwick (yellow card) 78'; Shaughnessy 86'	Report	Fiorini 10'; Scully 50'; Eyoma (yellow card) 65'; Montsma (yellow card) 90+5'	Stadium: Pirelli Stadium; Attendance: 3,359; Referee: Craig Hicks

28 September 2021 10	Morecambe	2–0	Lincoln City	Morecambe
19:45 BST	Stockton 53'; McLaughlin (yellow card) 55'; Wootton 79'	Report		Stadium: Mazuma Stadium; Attendance: 3,466; Referee: Ben Toner

2 October 2021 11	Lincoln City	2–2	Plymouth Argyle	Lincoln
15:00 BST	Bishop (yellow card) 36'; Nlundulu (yellow card) 45+4'; Sørensen 66'; Maguire (yellow card) 80'; Scully 90' (pen.), (yellow card) 90+2'	Report	Hardie 25'; Galloway 74'; Scarr (yellow card) 90'; Edwards (yellow card) 90+2'	Stadium: LNER Stadium; Attendance: 8,375; Referee: Andy Woolmer

16 October 2021 12	Lincoln City	2–1	Charlton Athletic	Lincoln
15:00 BST	Poole (yellow card) 12', (goal) 90+1'; Stockley 58' (o.g.)	Report	Gilbey (yellow card) 14'; Arter (yellow card) 22'; Lavelle 63'; Stockley (yellow card) 71'; Kirk (yellow card) 88'	Stadium: LNER Stadium; Attendance: 9,169; Referee: David Webb

19 October 2021 13	Lincoln City	0–1	AFC Wimbledon	Lincoln
19:45 GMT	Eyoma (yellow card) 30'; Montsma (yellow card) 35'; Fiorini (yellow card) 81'	Report	Pressley 5' (pen.), (yellow card) 67'; Hartigan (yellow card) 22'; Lawrence (yellow card) 35'	Stadium: LNER Stadium; Attendance: 7,750; Referee: Paul Howard

23 October 2021 14	Sheffield Wednesday	1–1	Lincoln City	Owlerton, Sheffield
15:00 BST	Adeniran 55'	Report	McGrandles (yellow card) 53'; Montsma 80'	Stadium: Hillsborough; Referee: Martin Coy

26 October 2021 15	Wigan Athletic	1–2	Lincoln City	Wigan
19:45 BST	Darikwa (yellow card) 18'; Watts (yellow card) 25'; Lang (yellow card) 30'; Massey 90+5'	Report	Nlundulu 14'; Robson (yellow card) 30'; Eyoma 57'; McGrandles (yellow card) 90+3'	Stadium: DW Stadium; Referee: Seb Stockbridge

30 October 2021 16	Lincoln City	1–1	Shrewsbury Town	Lincoln
15:00 BST	Fiorini (yellow card) 13'; McGrandles 43'; Poole (yellow card) 89'	Report	Udoh (yellow card) 30'; Leahy 50'; Whalley (yellow card) 80'	Stadium: LNER Stadium; Attendance: 8,047; Referee: Bobby Madley

20 November 2021 17	Doncaster Rovers	0–0	Lincoln City	Doncaster
15:00 BST	Anderson (yellow card) 71'	Report	McGrandles (yellow card) 27'; Jackson (yellow card) 50'	Stadium: Keepmoat Stadium; Attendance: 8,129; Referee: Robert Lewis

23 November 2021 18	Lincoln City	0–3	Portsmouth	Lincoln
19:45 BST	Montsma (yellow card) 60'; Maguire (yellow card) 84'	Report	Raggett (yellow card) 28'; Morrell (yellow card) 32'; Harness 45+3'; Hirst 66'; Hackett-Fairchild 89'	Stadium: LNER Stadium; Attendance: 8,533; Referee: Ross Joyce

27 November 2021 19	Lincoln City	0–1	Accrington Stanley	Lincoln
15:15 BST	Adelakun (yellow card) 77'	Report	Rogers (yellow card) 17'; Coyle (yellow card) 23'; Bishop 55'; Sykes (yellow card) 90+4'	Stadium: LNER Stadium; Attendance: 8,547; Referee: Craig Hicks

7 December 2021 20	Crewe Alexandra	2–0	Lincoln City	Crewe
19:45 GMT	Griffiths (yellow card) 45+5'; Mandron 48' (pen.), 52' (pen.)	Report	Eyoma (yellow card) 37', (red card) 50'; Robson (yellow card) 45+3'	Stadium: Mornflake Stadium; Attendance: 3,285; Referee: Declan Bourne

11 December 2021 21	Cheltenham Town	2–2	Lincoln City	Cheltenham
15:00 GMT	May 17', (yellow card) 71'; Long (yellow card) 59'; Raglan (yellow card) 69'; Williams (yellow card) 90+3'; Blair 90+5'; Pollock (yellow card) 90+6'	Report	Bridcutt (yellow card) 65'; Bishop 69', 90+1'; McGrandles (yellow card) 75'	Stadium: Jonny-Rocks Stadium; Attendance: 3,512; Referee: Tom Nield

26 December 2021 22	Lincoln City	2–3	Milton Keynes Dons	Lincoln
15:00 GMT	O'Hora 4' (o.g.); Maguire 8' (pen.), (yellow card) 90+2'; McGrandles (yellow card) 43'; Bridcutt (yellow card) 60'; Eyoma (yellow card) 81'	Report	Twine (yellow card) 43', (goal) 59', 90'; O'Riley 75'; Darling (yellow card) 79'	Stadium: LNER Stadium; Attendance: 8,328; Referee: Carl Boyeson

8 January 2022 23	Lincoln City	2–0	Oxford United	Lincoln
15:00 GMT	Scully 40'; Whittaker 56'	Report	Kane (red card) 77'	Stadium: LNER Stadium; Attendance: 8,053; Referee: Seb Stockbridge

11 January 2022 24	Sunderland	1–3	Lincoln City	Sunderland
19:45 BST	Winchester (yellow card) 41', (red card) 56'; Stewart (penalty missed) 68', 68'; Doyle (yellow card) 90+7'	Report	Maguire (yellow card) 10', (goal) 31', 57' (pen.), 75'; Bishop (yellow card) 23'; Eyoma (yellow card) 42'; Whittaker (yellow card) 64'; Fiorini (yellow card) 84'; Sørensen (yellow card) 90+1'; McGrandles (yellow card) 90+7'	Stadium: Stadium of Light; Attendance: 28,782; Referee: Jeremy Simpson

15 January 2022 25	Lincoln City	0–1	Cambridge United	Lincoln
15:00 GMT		Report	Brophy (yellow card) 71'; Ironside 90+1'	Stadium: LNER Stadium; Attendance: 8,507; Referee: Andrew Kitchen

22 January 2022 26	Plymouth Argyle	1–2	Lincoln City	Plymouth
15:00 GMT	Jephcott 34'; Garrick (yellow card) 90+4'	Report	Marquis 51'; Bramall (yellow card) 62'; Bishop (yellow card) 82'; Cullen (yellow card) 88'; Melbourne 90+2'; McGrandles (yellow card) 90+4'	Stadium: Home Park; Attendance: 12,269; Referee: Neil Hair

29 January 2022 27	Lincoln City	1–2	Burton Albion	Lincoln
15:00 GMT	Marquis 49'	Report	Oshilaja (yellow card) 19'; Kokolo (yellow card) 51'; Powell 56'; Hughes 80'	Stadium: LNER Stadium; Attendance: 9,159; Referee: Charles Breakspear

5 February 2022 28	Milton Keynes Dons	2–1	Lincoln City	Milton Keynes
15:00 GMT	Darling 39'; O'Hora 47'; Coventry (yellow card) 69'; Harvie (yellow card) 79'	Report	Marquis 8'	Stadium: Stadium MK; Attendance: 8,723; Referee: Brett Huxtable

8 February 2022 29	Lincoln City	2–1	Morecambe	Lincoln
19:45 GMT	Whittaker 10'; Bramall 19'; Walsh (yellow card) 42'; Maguire (yellow card) 90+2'	Report	Diagouraga 56'; Bedeau (yellow card) 90+2'	Stadium: LNER Stadium; Attendance: 7,571; Referee: Anthony Backhouse

12 February 2022 30	Lincoln City	1–1	Wycombe Wanderers	Lincoln
15:00 GMT	Cullen 5'; Bramall (yellow card) 63'; Griffiths (yellow card) 68'; Maguire (yellow card) 74'; Marquis (yellow card) 83'; McGrandles (yellow card) 90+4'	Report	Scowen (yellow card) 20' (yellow-red card) 90+3'; Forino-Joseph 85'	Stadium: LNER Stadium; Attendance: 8,319; Referee: Ollie Yates

15 February 2022 31	Lincoln City	0–1	Doncaster Rovers	Lincoln
19:45 GMT	Walsh (yellow card) 80' (yellow-red card) 88'	Report	Gardner 81' (pen.); Mitchell (yellow card) 90+10'	Stadium: LNER Stadium; Attendance: 9.237; Referee: Ben Speedie

23 February 2022 32	Bolton Wanderers	3–1	Lincoln City	Horwich
19:45 GMT	Johnston 53'; Bakayoko (yellow card) 68' (goal) 83'; Sadlier 76'; Charles (yellow card) 88'; Williams (yellow card) 90'	Report	Bramall 65'	Stadium: University of Bolton Stadium; Attendance: 13,841; Referee: Sam Allison

26 February 2022 33	Lincoln City	0–2	Gillingham	Lincoln
15:00 GMT	Bishop (yellow card) 43'; Walsh (yellow card) 90+4'	Report	Lee (yellow card) 11'; Jackson (yellow card) 74'; Oliver 75'; Masterson (yellow card) 85'; Reeves (yellow card) 86'; Thompson 90+1'	Stadium: LNER Stadium; Attendance: 8,208; Referee: Ross Joyce

5 March 2022 34	Lincoln City	3–1	Sheffield Wednesday	Lincoln
15:00 GMT	Marquis 3', 76'; Maguire (yellow card) 16'; McGrandles (yellow card) 29'; Norton-Cuffy 62'	Report	Paterson (yellow card) 29'; Berahino 33'	Stadium: LNER Stadium; Attendance: 10,283; Referee: Martin Coy

8 March 2022 35	Ipswich Town	2–0	Lincoln City	Ipswich
19:45 GMT	Burns 22'; Jackson 32'; Celina (yellow card) 45+1'	Report	Poole (yellow card) 39'; McGrandles (yellow card) 45+1'; Maguire (yellow card) 45+3'	Stadium: Portman Road; Attendance: 24,989; Referee: Tom Reeves

12 March 2022 36	AFC Wimbledon	0–2	Lincoln City	Wimbledon
15:00 GMT	Mebude (yellow card) 60'; Brown (yellow card) 66'; Robinson (yellow card) 78'; Hartigan (yellow card) 88'	Report	Fiorini 38', (yellow card) 69'; Norton-Cuffy (red card) 66'; Maguire (yellow card) 72'; Eyoma (yellow card) 79'; Bishop 82'	Stadium: Plough Lane Stadium; Attendance: 8,174; Referee: Carl Brook

15 March 2022 37	Rotherham United	2–1	Lincoln City	Rotherham
19:45 GMT	Wiles 11'; Ogbene 13'; Rathbone (yellow card) 45+3'; Wood (yellow card) 70'	Report	Hopper (yellow card) 49', (goal) 81'; Walsh (yellow card) 82'	Stadium: AESSEAL New York Stadium; Attendance: 9,575; Referee: Chris Sarginson

19 March 2022 38	Lincoln City	0–0	Sunderland	Lincoln
15:00 GMT	Walsh (yellow card) 50'; McGrandles (yellow card) 87'	Report	Evans (yellow card) 39'	Stadium: LNER Stadium; Attendance: 10,346; Referee: Craig Hicks

26 March 2022 39	Shrewsbury Town	1–0	Lincoln City	Shrewsbury
15:00 GMT	Leahy (yellow card) 22'; Bennett (yellow card) 51'; Vela (yellow card) 62'; Udoh 84'	Report		Stadium: Montgomery Waters Meadow; Attendance: 6,791; Referee: Christopher Pollard

2 April 2022 40	Charlton Athletic	1–2	Lincoln City	Charlton
15:00 BST	Gilbey (yellow card) 25' (yellow-red card) 37'; Stockley 88'	Report	Whittaker 33', (red card) 57'; Fiorini (yellow card) 57'; Scully 76'	Stadium: The Valley; Attendance: 10,091; Referee: Bobby Madley

5 April 2022 41	Fleetwood Town	1–1	Lincoln City	Fleetwood
19:45 BST	Clarke (yellow card) 22'; Batty 31'; Butterworth (yellow card) 90+3'	Report	Walsh (yellow card) 21'; McGrandles (yellow card) 35'; Fiorini 65'; Jackson (yellow card) 78'	Stadium: Highbury Stadium; Referee: Peter Wright

9 April 2022 42	Lincoln City	1–3	Wigan Athletic	Lincoln
15:00 BST	Scully 14'; Cullen (yellow card) 38'	Report	Lang 8', 72'; Naylor (yellow card) 12'; Keane 21'; Watts (yellow card) 54'; Kerr (yellow card) 56'; Darikwa (yellow card) 82'	Stadium: LNER Stadium; Attendance: 9,498; Referee: Scott Oldham

15 April 2022 43	Portsmouth	3–2	Lincoln City	Milton
15:00 BST	Thompson (yellow card) 33'; Hirst 50' (pen.); Jacobs 68'; Curtis 82'	Report	Jackson (yellow card) 68'; Bishop 70'; House 78'	Stadium: Fratton Park; Attendance: 15,175; Referee: Trevor Kettle

18 April 2022 44	Lincoln City	3–0	Cheltenham Town	Lincoln
15:00 BST	Whittaker 4', 19'; Scully 17'	Report	Ramsey (yellow card) 8'; Freestone (yellow card) 57'; May (yellow card) 81'	Stadium: LNER Stadium; Attendance: 8,672; Referee: Simon Mather

23 April 2022 45	Accrington Stanley	2–1	Lincoln City	Accrington
15:00 BST	Jackson 34' (o.g.); Bishop 59'; Savin (red card) 61'	Report	Whittaker (yellow card) 85'; Marquis (yellow card) 90'; Fiorini 90+3', (yellow card) 90+7'	Stadium: Wham Stadium; Attendance: 3,053; Referee: Marc Edwards

30 April 2022 46	Lincoln City	2–1	Crewe Alexandra	Lincoln
12:30 BST	Hopper 79'; Adelakun 90'	Report	Long 21'	Stadium: LNER Stadium; Attendance: 9,147; Referee: Andrew Kitchen

=== FA Cup ===
Lincoln were drawn at home to Bowers & Pitsea in the first round. They were drawn against either Hartlepool United or Wycombe Wanderers in the second round, drawn on the 8 November 2021.

6 November 2021 First round	Lincoln City	1–0	Bowers & Pitsea	Lincoln
15:00 BST	Nlundulu (yellow card) 27'; Sanders 66'	Report	Manor (yellow card) 18'; Dicks (yellow card) 27'; Bentley (yellow card) 67'; Stephen (yellow card) 87'; Trendall (yellow card) 90'	Stadium: LNER Stadium; Attendance: 5,800; Referee: Marc Edwards

4 December 2021 Second round	Lincoln City	0–1	Hartlepool United	Lincoln
15:00 BST	Maguire (yellow card) 77'	Report	Fiorini 52' (o.g.); Holohan (yellow card) 89'	Stadium: LNER Stadium; Attendance: 5,506; Referee: Bobby Madley

=== EFL Cup ===
The first round draw was made on 24 June, live on Sky Sports, by Andy Cole and Danny Mills.

10 August 2021 First round	Shrewsbury Town	2–2 (4–2 p)	Lincoln City	Shrewsbury
19:45 BST	Udoh 69', 79'	Report	Hopper 49'; Bishop 52'	Stadium: Montgomery Waters Meadow; Attendance: 2,069; Referee: Andy Haines
	Penalties
	Bennett (penalty scored); Nurse (penalty scored); Davis (penalty scored); Vela (penalty missed); Bloxham (penalty scored)		(penalty scored) Scully; (penalty missed) Hopper; (penalty scored) Sanders; (penalty missed) Fiorini

=== EFL Trophy ===
The Imps were drawn into Group F of the Northern section alongside Bradford City, Sunderland and Manchester United U21. Two of the three group stage fixture dates were later confirmed on July 22. The opening group stage fixture was confirmed on August 17. They were drawn against Carlisle United in the second round drawn.

Pos	Div	Team	Pld	W	PW	PL	L	GF	GA	GD	Pts	Qualification
1	L1	Sunderland	3	2	0	1	0	5	3	+2	7	Advance to Round 2
2	L1	Lincoln City	3	2	0	0	1	7	4	+3	6	Advance to Round 2
3	ACA	Manchester United U21	3	1	0	0	2	6	5	+1	3	
4	L2	Bradford City	3	0	1	0	2	1	7	−6	2	

Source: EFL.com

24 August 2021 Group Game 1	Lincoln City	3–2	Manchester United U21	Lincoln
19:00 BST	Scully 23', 32', 57'; McGrandles (yellow card) 39'	Report	McNeill 68'; Mejbri (yellow card) 87' (yellow-red card) 90+1'; Hardley 89'	Stadium: LNER Stadium; Attendance: 3,510; Referee: Chris Sarginson

31 August 2021 Group Game 2	Bradford City	0–3	Lincoln City	Bradford
19:00 BST		Report	Hopper 14'; Bishop (yellow card) 16'; Adelakun 36'; Scully 49'; Bridcutt (yellow card) 68'	Stadium: Utilita Energy Stadium; Attendance: 1,739

5 October 2021 Group Game 3	Lincoln City	1–2	Sunderland	Lincoln
19:00 BST	Montsma (yellow card) 56', (goal) 90+4'	Report	Neil 2'; Wearne 72'	Stadium: LNER Stadium; Attendance: 3,060; Referee: Scott Oldham

30 November 2021 Round 2	Carlisle United	1–1 (4–3 p)	Lincoln City	Carlisle
19:00 BST	Mellish (yellow card) 55'; Armer 69'; Guy (yellow card) 90+2'	Report	Maguire 45', (yellow card) 85'; Adelakun (yellow card) 55'; McGrandles (yellow card) 90+1'	Stadium: Brunton Park; Attendance: 884; Referee: James Bell
	Penalties
	Mellish (penalty missed); Armer (penalty scored); Whelan (penalty scored); Young (penalty scored); Charters (penalty scored)		(penalty missed) Maguire; (penalty scored) Fiorini; (penalty scored) Bishop; (penalty scored) McGrandles; (penalty missed) Montsma

== Transfers & contracts ==
=== Transfers in ===
Date	Pos.	Nat.	Name	From	Fee	Ref.
7 July 2021	RW	SCO	Chris Maguire	Sunderland	Free transfer	
23 July 2021	CM	DEN	Lasse Sørensen	Stoke City	Undisclosed	
26 July 2021	RW	ENG	Hakeeb Adelakun	Bristol City	Free transfer	
27 July 2021	CM	ENG	Teddy Bishop	Ipswich Town	Undisclosed	
17 August 2021	CB	ENG	TJ Eyoma	Tottenham Hotspur	Undisclosed	
31 August 2021	LB	SCO	Jamie Robson	Dundee United	Undisclosed	
18 January 2022	FW	ENG	John Marquis	Portsmouth	Undisclosed	
21 January 2022	GK	ENG	Jordan Wright	Nottingham Forest	Undisclosed	
24 January 2022	FW	SCO	Ben House	Eastleigh	Undisclosed	
28 January 2022	FW	ENG	Charley Kendall	Eastbourne Borough	Undisclosed	

=== Transfers out ===
Date	Pos.	Nat.	Name	To	Fee	Ref.
29 June 2021	CM	ENG	Jorge Grant	Peterborough United	Undisclosed	
1 July 2021	RW	ENG	Harry Anderson	Bristol Rovers	Released	
1 July 2021	GK	ENG	Ethan Ross	Stockport County	Released	
15 July 2021	LW	EIR	Zack Elbouzedi	AIK	Undisclosed	
24 August 2021	CM	SCO	James Jones	Wrexham	Undisclosed	
31 August 2021	LB	ENG	Tayo Edun	Blackburn Rovers	Undisclosed	
21 January 2022	RW	ENG	Remy Longdon	York City	Undisclosed	

=== Loans in ===
Date	Pos.	Nat.	Name	From	Until	Ref.
2 July 2021	CM	SCO	Lewis Fiorini	Manchester City	End of season	
14 July 2021	CF	ENG	Dan Nlundulu	Southampton	6 January 2022 (Note: Dan Nlundulu was recalled from his loan on 6 January 2022.)	
24 July 2021	GK	ENG	Josh Griffiths	West Bromwich Albion	End of season	
24 September 2021	GK	SCO	Archie Mair	Norwich City	6 January 2022 (Note: Archie Mair was recalled from his loan on 6 January 2022.)	
1 January 2022	RW	ENG	Morgan Whittaker	Swansea City	End of season	
13 January 2022	FW	WAL	Liam Cullen	Swansea City	End of season	
18 January 2022	RB	ENG	Brooke Norton-Cuffy	Arsenal	End of season	

=== Loans out ===
Date	Pos.	Nat.	Name	To	Until	Ref.
1 July 2021	FW	ENG	Jovon Makama	Gainsborough Trinity	End of season	
29 July 2021	RW	SCO	Theo Archibald	Leyton Orient	End of season	
11 August 2021	CB	ENG	Hayden Cann	Gainsborough Trinity	End of season	
31 August 2021	LB	ENG	Max Melbourne	Stevenage	10 January 2022 (Note: Max Melbourne was recalled from his loan on 10 January 2022.)	
18 September 2021	FW	IRE	Billy Brooks	Gainsborough Trinity	Work experience	
21 October 2021	GK	ENG	Sam Long	Gainsborough Trinity	6 November 2021 (Note: Sam Long was recalled from his loan on 6 November 2021.)	
16 December 2021	FW	ENG	Remy Longdon	York City	21 January 2022 (Note: Remy Longdon's loan was turned permanent on 21 January 2022.)	
14 January 2022	CB	ENG	Hayden Cann	Lincoln United	February 2022	
14 January 2021	CB	ENG	Bobby Deane	Lincoln United	February 2022	
26 January 2022	GK	ENG	Sam Long	Drogheda United	16 June 2022 (Note: Sam Long was recalled from his loan on 16 June 2022.)	
26 January 2022	CB	IRE	Sean Roughan	Drogheda United	16 June 2022 (Note: Sean Roughan was recalled from his loan on 16 June 2022.)	
28 January 2022	FW	ENG	Charley Kendall	Eastbourne Borough	End of season	
11 February 2022	FW	ENG	Freddie Draper	Gainsborough Trinity	End of season	

=== New contracts ===
Date from	Pos.	Nat.	Name	Length	Expiry	Ref.
28 July 2021	FW	ENG	Freddie Draper	3 years	June 2024	
3 December 2021	MF	IRL	Oisin Gallagher	3 years	June 2024	
30 December 2021	GK	ENG	Sam Long	4 years	June 2025	
4 February 2022	CB	NED	Lewis Montsma	2 1/2 years	June 2024	
17 March 2022	CM	ENG	Morgan Worsfold-Gregg	-	-	
21 March 2022	CM	ENG	Elicha Ahui	-	-	
4 May 2022	FW	ENG	Jovon Makama	-	-	
18 May 2022	LB	IRL	Sean Roughan	One-year option	June 2023	

== Squad statistics ==
=== Appearances ===
As of 30 April 2022

No.	Pos	Nat	Player	Total		League 1		FA Cup		League Cup		EFL Trophy	
No.	Pos	Nat	Player	Apps	Goals	Apps	Goals	Apps	Goals	Apps	Goals	Apps	Goals
1	GK	(England) ENG	Josh Griffiths	35	0	33	0	0	0	1	0	1	0
2	DF	(Wales) WAL	Regan Poole	50	1	44	1	1	0	1	0	4	0
3	DF	(England) ENG	Max Melbourne	8	1	5+2	1	0	0	1	0	0	0
4	DF	(Netherlands) NED	Lewis Montsma	25	2	18	1	2	0	1	0	4	1
5	DF	(England) ENG	Adam Jackson	26	0	23+2	0	1	0	0	0	0	0
6	MF	(England) ENG	Max Sanders	24	1	5+14	0	1+1	1	1	0	2	0
7	FW	(England) ENG	Morgan Whittaker	20	5	17+3	5	0	0	0	0	0	0
8	FW	(Wales) WAL	Liam Cullen	20	1	13+7	1	0	0	0	0	0	0
9	FW	(England) ENG	Tom Hopper	22	4	14+6	2	0	0	1	1	1	1
10	FW	(Scotland) SCO	Chris Maguire	36	5	28+4	4	2	0	0	0	2	1
11	FW	(Republic of Ireland) IRL	Anthony Scully	39	15	31+4	11	0	0	1	0	3	4
12	MF	(England) ENG	Teddy Bishop	42	4	28+8	3	2	0	1	1	2+1	0
14	MF	(England) ENG	Hakeeb Adelakun	29	3	10+13	2	2	0	1	0	3	1
15	DF	(England) ENG	Cohen Bramall	36	2	22+7	2	1+1	0	1	0	3+1	0
16	DF	(Wales) WAL	Joe Walsh	13	0	12	0	0	0	0	0	1	0
17	FW	(Scotland) SCO	Ben House	6	1	2+4	1	0	0	0	0	0	0
18	MF	(Scotland) SCO	Conor McGrandles	45	2	39	2	2	0	1	0	2+1	0
19	MF	(Scotland) SCO	Lewis Fiorini	44	6	32+7	6	1	0	0+1	0	3	0
20	DF	(England) ENG	Brooke Norton-Cuffy	17	1	13+4	1	0	0	0	0	0	0
21	MF	(Denmark) DEN	Lasse Sørensen	34	1	19+11	1	0	0	0+1	0	1+2	0
22	DF	(England) ENG	TJ Eyoma	28	1	20+3	1	1	0	0	0	3+1	0
23	MF	(Scotland) SCO	Liam Bridcutt	15	0	14	0	0	0	0	0	1	0
24	DF	(Scotland) SCO	Jamie Robson	26	0	20+3	0	1	0	0	0	1+1	0
27	FW	(England) ENG	John Marquis	20	5	17+3	5	0	0	0	0	0	0
29	GK	(England) ENG	Jordan Wright	13	0	12+1	0	0	0	0	0	0	0
34	FW	(England) ENG	Freddie Draper	9	0	3+5	0	0+1	0	0	0	0	0
35	MF	(Republic of Ireland) IRL	Billy Brooks	1	0	0	0	0	0	0	0	0+1	0
Away on loan
30	DF	(Republic of Ireland) IRL	Sean Roughan	1	0	0	0	1	0	0	0	0	0
31	GK	(England) ENG	Sam Long	6	0	1	0	2	0	0	0	3	0
No longer at the club
7	MF	(England) ENG	Tayo Edun	4	1	4	1	0	0	0	0	0	0
17	FW	(England) ENG	Remy Longdon	8	0	0+4	0	0	0	0+1	0	2+1	0
20	FW	(England) ENG	Dan Nlundulu	21	1	6+10	1	2	0	0	0	2+1	0

=== Goalscorers ===
As of 30 April 2022

Includes all competitive matches.

Rank	Pos.	Nat.	No.	Player	League One	FA Cup	League Cup	EFL Cup	Total
1	FW	(Republic of Ireland)	11	Anthony Scully	11	0	0	4	15
2	MF	(Scotland)	19	Lewis Fiorini	6	0	0	0	6
3	FW	(England)	7	Morgan Whittaker	5	0	0	0	5
3	FW	(Scotland)	10	Chris Maguire	4	0	0	1	5
3	MF	(England)	12	Teddy Bishop	4	0	1	0	5
3	FW	(England)	27	John Marquis	5	0	0	0	5
4	FW	(England)	9	Tom Hopper	2	0	1	1	4
5	MF	(England)	14	Hakeeb Adelakun	2	0	0	1	3
6	DF	(Netherlands)	4	Lewis Montsma	1	0	0	1	2
6	DF	(England)	15	Cohen Bramall	2	0	0	0	2
6	MF	(Scotland)	18	Conor McGrandles	2	0	0	0	2
7	DF	(Wales)	2	Regan Poole	1	0	0	0	1
7	DF	(England)	3	Max Melbourne	1	0	0	0	1
7	MF	(England)	12	Max Sanders	0	1	0	0	1
7	MF	(England)	7	Tayo Edun	1	0	0	0	1
7	FW	(Wales)	8	Liam Cullen	1	0	0	0	1
7	FW	(England)	17	Ben House	1	0	0	0	1
7	DF	(England)	20	Brooke Norton-Cuffy	1	0	0	0	1
7	FW	(England)	20	Dan Nlundulu	1	0	0	0	1
7	MF	(Denmark)	21	Lasse Sørensen	1	0	0	0	1
7	DF	(England)	22	TJ Eyoma	1	0	0	0	1
Own goals					2	0	0	0	2
Total					55	1	2	8	66

=== Disciplinary record ===
As of 23 April 2022

No.	Pos.	Name	League One		FA Cup		League Cup		EFL Trophy		Total	
No.	Pos.	Name	Booked	Sent off (straight red)	Booked	Sent off (straight red)	Booked	Sent off (straight red)	Booked	Sent off (straight red)	Booked	Sent off (straight red)
16	DF	Joe Walsh	6	1	0	0	0	0	0	0	6	1
22	DF	TJ Eyoma	6	1	0	0	0	0	0	0	6	1
7	FW	Morgan Whittaker	2	1	0	0	0	0	0	0	2	1
20	DF	Brooke Norton-Cuffy	0	1	0	0	0	0	0	0	0	1
18	MF	Conor McGrandles	12	0	0	0	0	0	2	0	14	0
10	FW	Chris Maguire	9	0	1	0	0	0	1	0	11	0
12	MF	Teddy Bishop	6	0	0	0	0	0	1	0	7	0
19	MF	Lewis Fiorini	6	0	0	0	0	0	0	0	6	0
5	DF	Adam Jackson	5	0	0	0	0	0	0	0	5	0
23	MF	Liam Bridcutt	4	0	0	0	0	0	1	0	5	0
4	DF	Lewis Montsma	3	0	0	0	0	0	1	0	4	0
2	DF	Regan Poole	3	0	0	0	0	0	0	0	3	0
15	DF	Cohen Bramall	3	0	0	0	0	0	0	0	3	0
7	MF	Tayo Edun	2	0	0	0	0	0	0	0	2	0
8	FW	Liam Cullen	2	0	0	0	0	0	0	0	2	0
14	MF	Hakeeb Adelakun	1	0	0	0	0	0	1	0	2	0
20	FW	Dan Nlundulu	1	0	1	0	0	0	0	0	2	0
24	DF	Jamie Robson	2	0	0	0	0	0	0	0	2	0
1	GK	Josh Griffiths	1	0	0	0	0	0	0	0	1	0
3	DF	Max Melbourne	1	0	0	0	0	0	0	0	1	0
9	FW	Tom Hopper	1	0	0	0	0	0	0	0	1	0
11	FW	Anthony Scully	1	0	0	0	0	0	0	0	1	0
21	MF	Lasse Sørensen	1	0	0	0	0	0	0	0	1	0
27	FW	John Marquis	1	0	0	0	0	0	0	0	1	0

=== Clean sheets ===
As of 30 April 2022

No.	Nat.	Player	Matches played	Clean sheet %	League One	FA Cup	League Cup	EFL Cup	TOTAL
1	(England)	Josh Griffiths	35	5.71%	2	0	0	0	2
29	(England)	Jordan Wright	13	30.77%	4	0	0	0	4
31	(England)	Sam Long	6	33.33%	0	1	0	1	2

== Awards ==
=== Club Player of the Season ===
Player	Ref.
(Wales) Regan Poole	

=== Club Academy Player of the Season ===
Player	Ref.
(England) Freddie Draper	

=== Sky Bet League One Player of the Month ===
Month	Player		Ref.
September	(Republic of Ireland) Anthony Scully	Nomination	

=== Sky Bet League One Manager of the Month ===
Month	Manager		Ref.
January	(England) Michael Appleton	Nomination	
