= Morgan Worsfold-Gregg =

English footballer

Personal information
- Full name: Morgan Taylor Worsfold-Gregg
- Date of birth: 20 September 2003 (age 23)
- Place of birth: London
- Height: 6 ft 0 in (1.83 m)
- Position: Midfielder

Team information
- Current team: Drexel Dragons
- Number: 8

Youth career
- Arsenal

Senior career*
Years	Team	Apps	(Gls)
2022–2024	Lincoln City	0	(0)
2022	→ Gainsborough Trinity (loan)	8	(0)
2022–2023	→ AFC Rushden & Diamonds (loan)	6	(0)
2023	→ Cleethorpes Town (loan)	8	(0)
2023	→ Long Eaton United (loan)	7	(1)
2024	HCU Huskies	0	(0)
2025–	Drexel Dragons	0	(0)
- * Club domestic league appearances and goals as of 21:55, 21 November 2023 (UTC)

Morgan Taylor Worsfold-Gregg (born 20 September 2003) is an English professional footballer who plays as a midfielder for Drexel Dragons.

== Club career ==
=== Lincoln City ===
Worsfold-Gregg signed his first professional contract with Lincoln City on 17 March 2022. He made his Lincoln City debut against Doncaster Rovers in the EFL Cup on 9 August 2022. On 12 August, he joined AFC Rushden & Diamonds on loan. He was recalled from his loan on 4 January 2023. On 17 February 2023 he joined Cleethorpes Town on loan for the remainder of the season.

On 8 September 2023, he joined Long Eaton United on a three-month loan.

On 28 November 2023, it was confirmed he would be joining HCU Huskies soccer team, ahead of the 2024 season.

== Career statistics ==
As of 21 November 2023.

Club	Season	League			FA Cup		EFL Cup		Other		Total	
Club	Season	Division	Apps	Goals	Apps	Goals	Apps	Goals	Apps	Goals	Apps	Goals
Lincoln City	2021–22	League One	0	0	0	0	0	0	0	0	0	0
Lincoln City	2022–23	League One	0	0	0	0	1	0	0	0	1	0
Lincoln City	2023–24	League One	0	0	0	0	0	0	0	0	0	0
Lincoln City	Total		0	0	0	0	1	0	0	0	1	0
Gainsborough Trinity (loan)	2021–22	Northern Premier League	8	0	0	0	0	0	0	0	8	0
AFC Rushden & Diamonds (loan)	2022–23	Southern Football League	6	0	1	0	0	0	1 (Note: Appearance(s) in FA Trophy)	0	8	0
Cleethorpes Town (loan)	2022–23	Northern Premier League D1 East	8	0	0	0	0	0	0	0	8	0
Long Eaton United (loan)	2023–24	Southern Football League	7	1	0	0	0	0	1	0	8	1
Career total			29	1	1	0	1	0	2	0	33	1
