= Billy Brooks (footballer) =

English footballer

Personal information
- Full name: William Brooks
- Date of birth: 15 February 2004 (age 22)
- Place of birth: England
- Height: 5 ft 9 in (1.75 m)
- Position: Attacking midfielder

Team information
- Current team: Piteå IF
- Number: 16

Senior career*
Years	Team	Apps	(Gls)
2021–2023	Lincoln City	0	(0)
2021	→ Gainsborough Trinity (loan)	2	(0)
2022	→ Lincoln United (loan)	5	(0)
2024	Lincoln United		
2024–25	Ytterhogdals IK	7	(3)
2025–	Piteå IF	41	(8)

International career^{‡}
2021	Republic of Ireland U18	3	(1)
2022	Republic of Ireland U19	2	(0)
- * Club domestic league appearances and goals as of 16 November 2026 ‡ National team caps and goals as of 12:31, 6 June 2022 (UTC)

William Brooks (born 15 February 2004) is an Irish professional footballer who plays as a forward for Piteå IF.

== Club career ==
=== Lincoln City ===
Brooks was offered an early Lincoln City scholarship at U16 level, along with Hayden Cann. He would make his Lincoln City debut against Manchester United U21 in the EFL Trophy on 24 August 2021 coming off the bench. He would join Gainsborough Trinity on a work experience loan on 18 September 2021.

=== Lincoln United ===
On 10 January 2024, Brooks rejoined Lincoln United.

== International career ==
He would be called up to the Republic of Ireland U18 team for the first time on 15 August 2021 and would make his international debut just two days later, coming off the bench against Hungary U18.

== Career statistics ==
As of 8 October 2022.

Club	Season	League			FA Cup		EFL Cup		Other		Total	
Club	Season	Division	Apps	Goals	Apps	Goals	Apps	Goals	Apps	Goals	Apps	Goals
Lincoln City	2021–22	League One	0	0	0	0	0	0	1 (Note: Appearance(s) in Football League Trophy)	0	1	0
Lincoln City	2022–23	League One	0	0	0	0	0	0	0	0	0	0
Lincoln City	Total		0	0	0	0	0	0	1	0	1	0
Gainsborough Trinity (loan)	2021–22	Northern Premier League	2	0	0	0	0	0	0	0	2	0
Lincoln United (loan)	2022–23	NPL Division One East	5	0	2	0	0	0	3 (Note: Appearance(s) in FA Vase)	0	10	0
Career total			7	0	2	0	0	0	4	0	13	0
