= Lewis Fiorini =

Scottish footballer

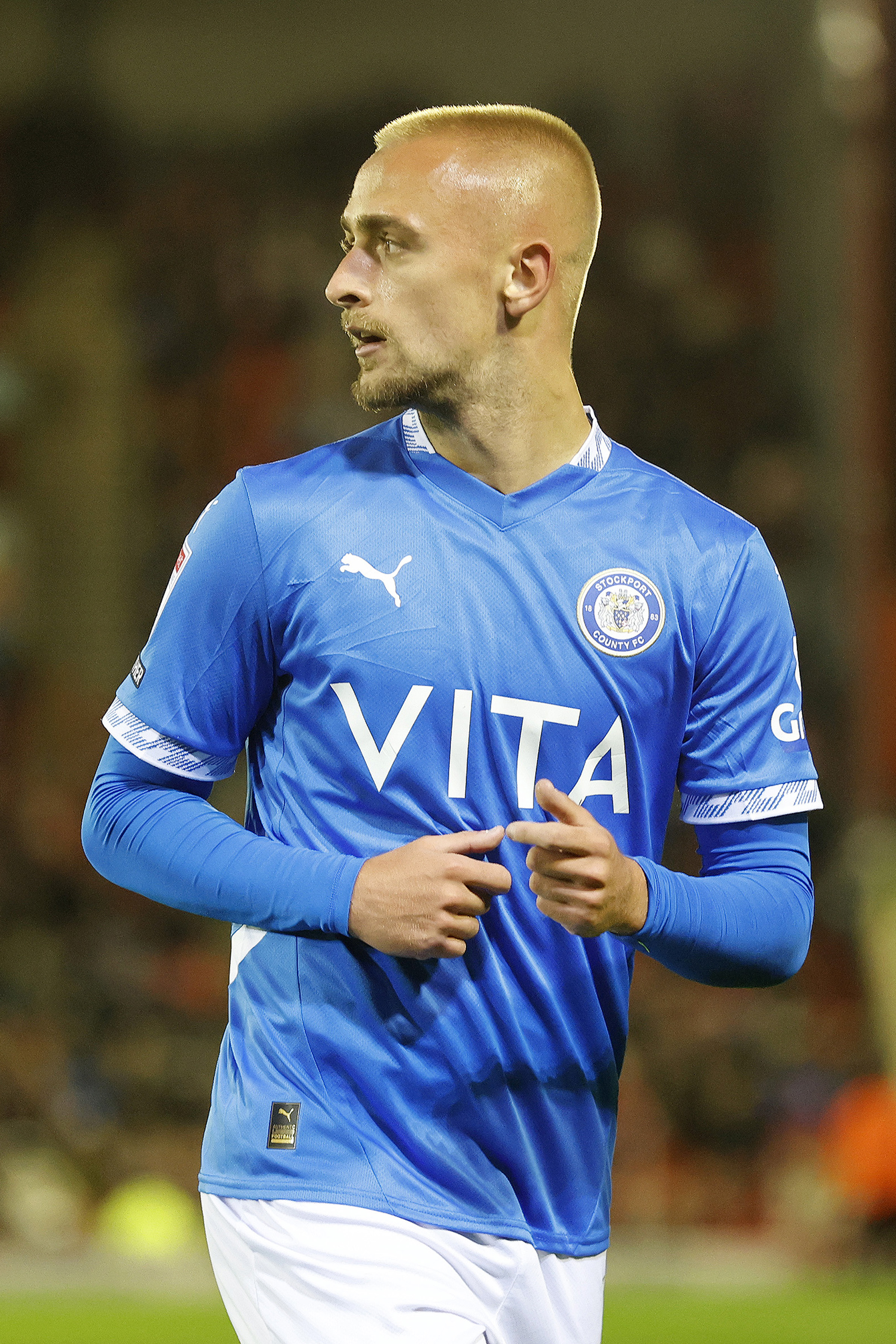
- Fiorini in 2024

Personal information
- Full name: Lewis Paul Fiorini
- Date of birth: 17 May 2002 (age 24)
- Place of birth: Manchester, England
- Height: 1.78 m (5 ft 10 in)
- Position: Midfielder

Team information
- Current team: Stockport County
- Number: 18

Youth career
- 2009–2020: Manchester City

Senior career*
Years	Team	Apps	(Gls)
2020–2024	Manchester City	0	(0)
2020–2021	→ NAC Breda (loan)	32	(5)
2021–2022	→ Lincoln City (loan)	39	(6)
2022–2023	→ Blackpool (loan)	13	(1)
2024	→ Charlton Athletic (loan)	5	(0)
2024–	Stockport County	29	(0)
2025	→ Dundee United (loan)	4	(0)

International career^{‡}
2017	England U15	1	(1)
2018	Scotland U16	3	(3)
2018	Scotland U17	3	(2)
2019–2020	Scotland U19	2	(0)
2020–2024	Scotland U21	13	(3)
- * Club domestic league appearances and goals as of 23:29, 25 October 2026 (UTC) ‡ National team caps and goals as of 17:10, 8 May 2026 (UTC)

Lewis Paul Fiorini (born 17 May 2002) is a professional footballer who plays as a midfielder for EFL League One club Stockport County. Born in England, Fiorini represents Scotland at youth international level.

== Club career ==
=== Manchester City ===
An attacking midfielder, Fiorini began his career at Manchester City and has progressed through several age groups. On 2 July 2021, he signed a new long-term contract at the club, keeping him at Manchester City until the summer of 2026.

==== NAC Breda (loan) ====
On 20 August 2020, Fiorini joined NAC Breda on a season-long loan, during which time he scored six goals and achieved five assists.

==== Lincoln City (loan) ====
On 2 July 2021, Fiorini signed a season-long loan at Lincoln City, admitting that he spoke with Manchester City teammate and ex-Lincoln City loanee Morgan Rogers about joining the club. He made his debut on the 10 August, coming off the bench in an EFL Cup tie against Shrewsbury Town which saw the Imps lose on penalties, with Fiorini missing their final one. He scored his first goal for the club, during a 5–1 victory against Cambridge United on 11 September 2021.

==== Blackpool (loan) ====
On 16 July 2022, Fiorini joined Blackpool on a season-long loan. He made his debut for the club in a single-goal victory over Reading at Bloomfield Road on 29 July. He scored his first goal for the club on 28 April 2023 in a 2–3 home defeat against Millwall. Late in the game he conceded a penalty which gave Millwall the win and relegated Blackpool.

==== Charlton Athletic (loan) ====
On 5 January 2024, Fiorini joined Charlton Athletic on loan for the rest of the 2023–24 season.

=== Stockport County ===
On 2 July 2024, Fiorini joined Stockport County on a three-year deal for an undisclosed fee.

==== Dundee United (loan) ====
On 20 January 2025, Fiorini joined Dundee United on loan for the rest of the season.

== Career statistics ==
=== Club ===
As of match played on 24 October 2026

Appearances and goals by club, season and competition
Club	Season	League			National cup (Note: Includes FA Cup, Scottish Cup)		League cup (Note: Includes EFL Cup, Scottish League Cup)		Other		Total	
Club	Season	Division	Apps	Goals	Apps	Goals	Apps	Goals	Apps	Goals	Apps	Goals
Manchester City U23	2019–20	–							4 (Note: Appearance(s) in EFL Trophy)	0	4	0
Manchester City	2020–21	Premier League	0	0	0	0	0	0	0	0	0	0
Manchester City	2021–22	Premier League	0	0	0	0	0	0	0	0	0	0
Manchester City	2022–23	Premier League	0	0	0	0	0	0	0	0	0	0
Manchester City	2023–24	Premier League	0	0	0	0	0	0	0	0	0	0
Manchester City	Manchester City total		0	0	0	0	0	0	4	0	0	0
NAC Breda (loan)	2020–21	Eerste Divisie	32	5	1	0	–		3 (Note: Appearance(s) in Eerste Divisie playoffs)	1	36	6
Lincoln City (loan)	2021–22	League One	39	6	1	0	1	0	3	0	44	6
Blackpool (loan)	2022–23	Championship	13	1	0	0	1	0	–		14	1
Charlton Athletic (loan)	2023–24	League One	5	0	–		–		–		5	0
Stockport County	2024–25	League One	11	0	1	0	0	0	3	0	15	0
Stockport County	2025–26	League One	9	0	0	0	2	1	4 (Note: Three appearances in the EFL Trophy and one appearance in the League One Play-offs)	0	15	1
Stockport County	2026–27	League One	9	0	1	1	1	0	2	0	12	0
Stockport County	Stockport County total		29	0	1	0	3	1	9	0	42	1
Dundee United (loan)	2024–25	Scottish Premiership	4	0	0	0	–		–		4	0
Career total			122	12	3	0	5	1	19	1	149	14
