= 2022–23 Lincoln City F.C. season =

Lincoln City
2022–23 season
- Chairman: Clive Nates
- Head Coach: Mark Kennedy
- Stadium: LNER Stadium
- League One: 11th
- FA Cup: First round (vs. Chippenham Town)
- EFL Cup: Fourth round (vs. Southampton)
- EFL Trophy: Quarter-final (vs. Accrington Stanley)
- Top goalscorer: League: Ben House (12 goals); All: Ben House (13 goals)
- Highest home attendance: 10,152 (vs Sheffield Wednesday; League One)
- Lowest home attendance: 1,306 (vs Everton U21; EFL Trophy)
- Average home league attendance: 8,486
- Biggest win: 6–3 (vs Bristol Rovers; League One)
- Biggest defeat: 4–0 (vs Peterborough United; League One)
Home colours	Away colours	Third colours

The 2022–23 season was the 139th season in the existence of Lincoln City F.C. and the club's fourth consecutive season in League One. In addition to the league, they competed in the 2022–23 FA Cup, the 2022–23 EFL Cup and the 2022–23 EFL Trophy.

Following the departure of Michael Appleton at the end of the 2021–22 season, Mark Kennedy was appointed as head coach resulting in a number of backroom staff changes. At the season close, in May 2023, Lincoln finished 11th in the league with 62 points. They reached the quarter finals of the EFL Trophy and fourth round of the EFL Cup but lost their opening first-round game of the FA Cup to Chippenham Town.

Toward the end of the season work began, following successful planning permission, to extend the Stacey West stand as part of increasing the capacity of the Stadium.

== Management ==
Following the departure of Michael Appleton, who had been with the club as head coach for three years, Lincoln appointed former Birmingham City assistant coach Mark Kennedy in early May.

On 10 June, David Kerslake (first-team assistant manager) and Richard O’Donnell (first-team coach) were relieved of their duties, with both going on to join Appleton at his new club, Blackpool. On 27 June, Mike Garrity replaced Kerslake in the assistant head coach role, having left a similar role at Blackpool. At the same time Tom Shaw, who previously had a joint coaching role in the club's academy and as head coach for local non-league side Gainsborough Trinity, was promoted to the first team coaching staff.

Further coaching changes occurred towards the end of pre-season. Scott Fry was appointed the new goalkeeper coach in early July, replacing Steve Croudson who would join Grimsby Town, and Jordan McCann left his role as the clubs head of academy on 1 August.

In December, Garrity left to join Championship side Queens Park Rangers rejoining new head coach Neil Critchley, with whom Garrity had worked at Blackpool. He was replaced by Danny Butterfield on the 23 December. Butterfield had previously worked with Kennedy for a short spell at Macclesfield.

== Stadium ==
On 8 June, the club announced that LNER Stadium would have a new capacity of 10,780 following the purchase of the North-East Stand.

On 27 June, GBM took over the naming rights of what was the Lincolnshire Co-Op stand in the LNER Stadium.

On 28 June, Rilmac Group took over the naming rights of what was the South Park stand in the LNER Stadium.

== Kit ==
The club launched their 2022–23 home kit on 18 June. The shirt consisted of Lincoln's traditional red and white stripes with black trim and was paired with black shorts and red/white socks. It was manufactured by Erreà, their fifth and final year as kit manufacturer. During the prior season the club had featured five front of shirt sponsors through the year, however on 17 June it was announced that the club would return to a single sponsor, Branston Ltd (a local potato supplier).

On 4 August, the club announced their new away strip for the season.

On 8 September, the club announced their third strip for the season.

== Pre-season ==
The club confirmed three friendlies on 16 May 2022, with two matches scheduled at home against Blackburn Rovers and an as yet unannounced team alongside an away trip to Hartlepool United. On 30 May, the club announced an additional fixture against Gainsborough Trinity, a TBC Championship side behind-doors friendly, and another yet to be announced fixture as well as sending an XI to Sleaford Town, Lincoln United and Eastbourne Borough. The behind-the-doors friendly was confirmed to be Sheffield United on 1 June 2022. The remaining fixtures against Grimsby Town and West Ham United U23 were confirmed on 9 June 2022. The game against West Ham United U23s was later cancelled.

On 24 June, the players reported back to first team training. On 28 July, the club announced squad numbers for the season and confirmed Tom Hopper as the new club captain.

2 July 2022 Friendly	Gainsborough Trinity	0–4	Lincoln City	Gainsborough
15:00 BST		Report	Bishop 40'; Roughan 42'; Kendall 78'; Brooks 88'	Stadium: The Dave Longstaff Martin and Co Arena; Attendance: 1,246

5 July 2022 Friendly	Maccabi Netanya	2–1	Lincoln City	Hungary
18:00 BST	32'; 64'		87'	Attendance: 0 (Played behind closed doors)

12 July 2022 Friendly	Sheffield United	2–0	Lincoln City	Sheffield
11:00 BST	Osula 4', 9'	Report		Stadium: Shirecliffe Ground; Attendance: 0 (Played behind closed doors)
Note: Match one of two 60-minute matches

12 July 2022 Friendly	Sheffield United	4–0	Lincoln City	Sheffield
12:30 BST	Osborn 4'; Berge 20'; Brewster 38', 44'	Report		Stadium: Shirecliffe Ground; Attendance: 0 (Played behind closed doors)
Note: Match two of two 60-minute matches

13 July 2022 Friendly	Sleaford Town	1–2	Lincoln City XI	Sleaford
19:45 BST				Stadium: Eslaforde Park; Attendance: 446

16 July 2022 Friendly	Hartlepool United	1–1	Lincoln City	Hartlepool
15:00 BST	Crawford 34'	Report	House 32'	Stadium: The Suit Direct Stadium; Attendance: 1,358

19 July 2022 Friendly	Grimsby Town	0–0	Lincoln City	Cleethorpes
19:30 BST		Report		Stadium: Blundell Park; Attendance: 3,813

20 July 2022 Friendly	Lincoln United	1–4	Lincoln City XI	Lincoln
19:00 BST	Janssen 27'	Report		Stadium: Ashby Avenue

23 July 2022 Friendly	Lincoln City	0–1	Blackburn Rovers	Lincoln
15:00 BST		Report	Dack 46'	Stadium: LNER Stadium

2 August 2022 Friendly	Eastbourne Borough	1–1	Lincoln City XI	Langney
19:45 BST	Beaconsfield 81'		Kendall 31'	Stadium: Priory Lane; Attendance: 458

== Season Overview ==
=== August ===
On 22 August, Chris Maguire was suspended by the club after being charged by The FA for misconduct under FA Rule E8.

=== September ===
On 9 September, the fixture against Accrington Stanley was postponed following the passing of Queen Elizabeth II.

On 15 September, the fixture against Milton Keynes Dons was postponed following international call ups for both sides.

On 16 September, academy products Sean Roughan, Sam Long and Oisin Gallagher were called up for Republic of Ireland U21, Scotland U21 and Republic of Ireland U19 teams respectively.

On 22 September, Jon Pepper was appointed the new head of academy.

On 26 September, Carl Rushworth was called up to the England U21 squad for their upcoming fixture.

=== November ===
On 4 November, Sam Long was called up the Scotland U21 squad.

On 26 November, the Jabara family increased their stake in the club.

=== December ===
On 11 December, assistant manager Mike Garrity left the club to join Queens Park Rangers as the assistant manager to Neil Critchley.

On 15 December, the club announced a partnership with US soccer side San Diego Loyal SC.

=== January ===
On 18 January, the club published their annual accounts for the year ending June 2022.

On 18 January, planning permission was granted to develop the Stacey West stand.

=== February ===
On 2 February, head of performance Ross Burbeary left the club to join Derby County.

On 7 February, Harvey Jabara and Graham Rossini joined the clubs board.

On 15 February, Pablo Webster, Evan Mitz and Brian Anderson made a significant investment in Lincoln City.

=== March ===
On 15 March, Sean Roughan, Oisin Gallagher and Julian Donnery were called up for Republic of Ireland U21, Republic of Ireland U19 and Scotland U18 teams respectively.

On 17 March, Carl Rushworth was called up to the England U21 squad for their upcoming fixture.

=== April ===
On 20 April, Lasse Sørensen was named the PFA Community Champion for Lincoln City.

=== May ===
On 10 May, the clubs retained list was published.

== Competitions ==
=== League One ===
==== League table ====
Pos	Team	Pld	W	D	L	GF	GA	GD	Pts
8	Portsmouth	46	17	19	10	61	50	+11	70
9	Wycombe Wanderers	46	20	9	17	59	51	+8	69
10	Charlton Athletic	46	16	14	16	70	66	+4	62
11	Lincoln City	46	14	20	12	47	47	0	62
12	Shrewsbury Town	46	17	8	21	52	61	−9	59
13	Fleetwood Town	46	14	16	16	53	51	+2	58
14	Exeter City	46	15	11	20	64	68	−4	56

Source: EFL Official Website
Rules for classification: 1) Points; 2) Goal difference; 3) Number of goals scored; 4) Head-to-head results; 5) Wins; 6) Away goals; 7) Penalty points (sec 9.5); 8) 12-point sending off offences

==== Results summary ====
Overall								Home						Away					
Pld	W	D	L	GF	GA	GD	Pts	W	D	L	GF	GA	GD	W	D	L	GF	GA	GD
46	14	20	12	47	47	0	62	7	14	2	22	17	+5	7	6	10	25	30	−5

Last updated: 7 May 2023.
Source: [ Soccerway]

==== Results by round ====
Round	1	2	3	4	5	6	7	8	9	10	11	12	13	14	15	16	17	18	19	20	21	22	23	24	25	26	27	28	29	30	31	32	33	34	35	36	37	38	39	40	41	42	43	44	45	46
Ground	H	A	H	A	A	H	A	H	A	A	H	A	H	A	A	H	H	H	A	H	A	H	H	A	A	H	A	H	A	H	A	H	H	A	A	H	A	A	H	A	H	H	A	H	A	H
Result	D	D	D	W	L	D	L	W	W	L	D	W	D	W	L	D	D	W	L	D	L	D	D	L	D	D	W	W	D	D	D	D	W	D	L	L	L	D	W	W	W	D	W	L	L	W
Position	15	19	17	11	17	18	20	16	8	14	15	14	15	11	14	13	15	9	12	14	14	15	15	16	16	16	16	13	13	14	15	14	11	11	12	14	14	14	14	13	12	11	10	10	11	11

Updated to match(es) played on 7 May 2023. Source: [ Soccerway]
A = Away; H = Home; W = Win; D = Draw; L = Loss; P = Postponed

==== Matches ====
On Thursday, 23 June 2022, the EFL League One fixtures were revealed.

30 July 2022 1	Lincoln City	1–1	Exeter City	Lincoln
15:00 BST	Hopper 49'; Sørensen (yellow card) 90+2'	Report	Nombe 14'; Sweeney (yellow card) 32'; Dieng (yellow card) 58'	Stadium: LNER Stadium; Attendance: 8,162; Referee: Andy Haines

6 August 2022 2	Portsmouth	0–0	Lincoln City	Portsmouth
15:00 BST		Report	Sanders (yellow card) 41'	Stadium: Fratton Park; Attendance: 17,855; Referee: David Rock

13 August 2022 3	Lincoln City	1–1	Forest Green Rovers	Lincoln
15:00 BST	Bishop (yellow card) 15'; Robson (yellow card) 54'; Cargill 63' (o.g.); Eyoma (yellow card) 75'	Report	Brown (yellow card) 42'; Little (yellow card) 15'; Wickham 73'; Davis (yellow card) 90+2'	Stadium: LNER Stadium; Attendance: 7,374; Referee: Ben Toner

16 August 2022 4	Oxford United	1–2	Lincoln City	Littlemore
19:45 BST	Seddon (yellow card) 36'; Taylor (yellow card) 38'; Brannagan 69' (pen.)	Report	Hopper 21'; Scully 45+1'; Sørensen (yellow card) 88'; Eyoma (yellow card) 90+2'	Stadium: Kassam Stadium; Attendance: 6,912; Referee: Sam Barrott

20 August 2022 5	Peterborough United	4–0	Lincoln City	Peterborough
15:00 BST	Marriott 21', 50'; Clarke-Harris 29' (pen.), 43'; Kent (yellow card) 35'	Report	O'Connor (yellow card) 28'; Garrick (yellow card) 40'	Stadium: Weston Homes Stadium; Attendance: 9,040; Referee: Rebecca Welch

27 August 2022 6	Lincoln City	2–2	Fleetwood Town	Lincoln
15:00 BST	Bishop 6', 14'; Roughan (yellow card) 33'; Hopper (yellow card) 59'; House (yellow card) 62'	Report	Nsiala (yellow card) 30'; Lane 32', (yellow card) 81'; Lynch (yellow card) 59'; Earl (yellow card) 60'; Garner 90+3'	Stadium: LNER Stadium; Attendance: 7,522; Referee: Ollie Yates

3 September 2022 7	Cambridge United	2–0	Lincoln City	Cambridge
15:00 BST	Ironside 24', 27'	Report	O'Connor (yellow card) 86'	Stadium: The Abbey Stadium; Attendance: 5,677; Referee: Sam Allison

10 September 2022	Lincoln City	Postponed	Accrington Stanley	Lincoln
15:00 BST				Stadium: LNER Stadium
Note: Fixture was postponed as a mark of respect following the passing of Queen Elizabeth II.

13 September 2022 8	Lincoln City	2–0	Derby County	Lincoln
19:45 BST	Diamond 12' (pen.); Roughan (yellow card) 57'; Rushworth (yellow card) 65'; House 68'; O'Connor (yellow card) 81'	Report	Hourihane (yellow card) 51'; Cashin (yellow card) 54'	Stadium: LNER Stadium; Attendance: 9,622; Referee: Thomas Kirk

17 September 2022 9	Bristol Rovers	3–6	Lincoln City	Horfield
15:00 BST	Evans (yellow card) 8'; Collins 18', 65'; Finley (yellow card) 59'; Loft 59'	Report	House 7', 61'; Diamond 14' (pen.), 45+1', 56'; Virtue 51'	Stadium: Memorial Stadium; Attendance: 8,078; Referee: Tom Nield

24 September 2022	Lincoln City	Postponed	Milton Keynes Dons	Lincoln
15:00 BST				Stadium: LNER Stadium
Note: Fixture was postponed due to international call-ups within both squads.

1 October 2022 10	Bolton Wanderers	2–0	Lincoln City	Horwich
15:00 BST	Charles 40' (pen.); Williams (yellow card) 48'; Johnston (yellow card) 51'; Böðvarsson 84'; Dempsey (yellow card) 90+2'	Report	Jackson (yellow card) 39'; House (yellow card) 51'	Stadium: University of Bolton Stadium; Attendance: 17,263; Referee: Neil Hair

8 October 2022 11	Lincoln City	0–0	Charlton Athletic	Lincoln
15:00 BST	Virtue (yellow card) 73'	Report	Egbo (yellow card) 77'	Stadium: LNER Stadium; Attendance: 8,160; Referee: Robert Lewis

15 October 2022 12	Ipswich Town	0–1	Lincoln City	Ipswich
15:00 BST	Evans (yellow card) 44'	Report	House 24'	Stadium: Portman Road; Attendance: 27,608; Referee: Andy Davies

22 October 2022 13	Lincoln City	1–1	Sheffield Wednesday	Lincoln
15:00 BST	Virtue (yellow card) 21'; Mandroiu 46' (yellow card) 59'	Report	Gregory 7'; McGuinness (yellow card) 79'; Byers (yellow card) 88'	Stadium: LNER Stadium; Attendance: 10,152; Referee: Alan Young

25 October 2022 14	Barnsley	0–1	Lincoln City	Barnsley
19:45 BST	Kane (yellow card) 26'; Benson (yellow card) 65'	Report	Mandroiu 45+2'; Sanders (yellow card) 66'	Stadium: Oakwell; Attendance: 10,397; Referee: James Oldham

29 October 2022 15	Port Vale	1–0	Lincoln City	Stoke-on-Trent
15:00 BST	Garrity (yellow card) 11'; Robinson (yellow card) 45+7'; Butterworth 68'; Jones (yellow card) 90+1'	Report	House (yellow card) 2'; Roughan (yellow card) 61'	Stadium: Vale Park; Attendance: 7,294; Referee: Sunny Gill

1 November 2022 16	Lincoln City	1–1	Accrington Stanley	Lincoln
19:45 GMT	Virtue (yellow card) 27'; House (yellow card) 45+1'; Diamond 60' (pen.); Poole (yellow card) 82'	Report	Clark (yellow card) 45+1'; Tharme (yellow card) 50'; Coyle (yellow card) 54'; Longelo (yellow card) 83'; Rodgers 85'	Stadium: LNER Stadium; Attendance: 7,317; Referee: Ross Joyce

12 November 2022 17	Lincoln City	1–1	Plymouth Argyle	Lincoln
15:00 GMT	Sanders 45+1'	Report	Randell 31' (yellow card) 90+2'; Houghton (yellow card) 71'; Lonwijk (yellow card) 81'	Stadium: LNER Stadium; Attendance: 9,014; Referee: Craig Hicks

19 November 2022 18	Lincoln City	2–1	Morecambe	Lincoln
15:00 GMT	Walsh 17'; House 67'; Oakley-Boothe (yellow card) 83'; Robson (yellow card) 86'; Sørensen (yellow card) 90+2'; Hopper (yellow card) 90+4'	Report	Weir 81', (yellow card) 89'	Stadium: LNER Stadium; Attendance: 8,325; Referee: Martin Coy

3 December 2022 19	Shrewsbury Town	2–0	Lincoln City	Shrewsbury
12:30 GMT	Dunkley (yellow card) 10'; Leahy 45' (pen.); Bayliss 60'; Moore (yellow card) 86'	Report	Vernam (yellow card) 31'; Walsh (yellow card) 43'; O'Connor (yellow card) 81'	Stadium: Montgomery Waters Meadow; Attendance: 5,461; Referee: Bobby Madden

10 December 2022 20	Lincoln City	0–0	Wycombe Wanderers	Lincoln
15:00 GMT		Report		Stadium: LNER Stadium; Attendance: 7,536; Referee: Thomas Kirk

17 December 2022	Cheltenham Town	Postponed	Lincoln City	Cheltenham
15:00 GMT				Stadium: Completely-Suzuki Stadium
Note: Fixture was postponed due to a frozen pitch.

26 December 2022 21	Burton Albion	3–0	Lincoln City	Burton upon Trent
15:00 GMT	Hughes 5'; Smith 14'; Adeboyejo 27' (pen.)	Report	Diamond (yellow card) 75'	Stadium: Pirelli Stadium; Attendance: 3,687; Referee: Ben Toner

30 December 2022 22	Lincoln City	1–1	Bolton Wanderers	Lincoln
19:45 GMT	House 10'; Poole (yellow card) 22'; Mandroiu (yellow card) 43'; Walsh (yellow card) 57' (yellow-red card) 61'; Diamond (yellow card) 63'; Virtue (yellow card) 89'	Report	Bradley (yellow card) 52'; Toal 58'	Stadium: LNER Stadium; Attendance: 9,047; Referee: Geoff Eltringham

2 January 2023 23	Lincoln City	1–1	Ipswich Town	Lincoln
15:00 GMT	Jackson (red card) 45'; Sanders (yellow card) 58'; Diamond 64' (pen.); Rushworth (yellow card) 69'	Report	Evans (yellow card) 21'; Humphreys 81'	Stadium: LNER Stadium; Attendance: 10,115; Referee: Declan Bourne

7 January 2023 24	Charlton Athletic	2–1	Lincoln City	Charlton
15:00 GMT	Fraser 35'; Blackett-Taylor 42'; Payne (yellow card) 87'; Sessegnon (yellow card) 88'; Dobson (yellow card) 90+8'	Report	Walsh (yellow card) 25'; Mandroiu 76'	Stadium: The Valley; Attendance: 12,165; Referee: James Oldham

14 January 2023 25	Milton Keynes Dons	0–0	Lincoln City	Denbigh
15:00 GMT	McEachran (yellow card) 75'	Report	O'Connor (yellow card) 90+4'	Stadium: Stadium MK; Attendance: 8,317; Referee: Ben Speedie

21 January 2023	Lincoln City	Postponed	Burton Albion	Lincoln
15:00 GMT				Stadium: LNER Stadium
Note: Fixture was postponed due to a frozen pitch.

28 January 2023 26	Lincoln City	0–0	Cambridge United	Lincoln
15:00 GMT	House (yellow card) 35'; Rougham (yellow card) 67'; Bishop (yellow card) 77'	Report	Brophy (yellow card) 59'; Digby (yellow card) 62'; Okenabirhie (yellow card) 74'	Stadium: LNER Stadium; Attendance: 8,266; Referee: Peter Wright

4 February 2023 27	Accrington Stanley	0–3	Lincoln City	Accrington
15:00 GMT	Tharme (yellow card) 39'; Perritt (red card) 56'; Woods (yellow card) 75'	Report	House 24' (yellow card) 60'; Roughan 55'; Bishop 58'; O'Connor (yellow card) 89'	Stadium: Wham Stadium; Attendance: 2,382; Referee: Sam Purkiss

11 February 2023 28	Lincoln City	1–0	Bristol Rovers	Lincoln
15:00 GMT	Poole 14'	Report	McCormack (yellow card) 25'; Loft (red card) 42'; Gibbons (yellow card) 68'; Quansah (yellow card) 88'	Stadium: LNER Stadium; Attendance: 8,025; Referee: Tom Reeves

14 February 2023 29	Derby County	1–1	Lincoln City	Derby
19:45 GMT	Knight (yellow card) 12'; Hourihane 69'	Report	House (yellow card) 21' (yellow-red card) 55'; Shodipo 43'; O'Connor (yellow card) 40'	Stadium: Pride Park Stadium; Attendance: 25,829; Referee: Scott Oldham

18 February 2023 30	Lincoln City	0–0	Portsmouth	Lincoln
15:00 GMT	Mandroiu (yellow card) 45+3'; Eyoma (yellow card) 90+2'	Report	Morrell (yellow card) 5'; Rafferty (yellow card) 33'; Hackett-Fairchild (yellow card) 56'; Pigott (yellow card) 66'	Stadium: LNER Stadium; Attendance: 9,906; Referee: Ross Joyce

25 February 2023 31	Forest Green Rovers	1–1	Lincoln City	Nailsworth
15:00 GMT	Garrick 58'; Robson (yellow card) 63'; Stevenson (yellow card) 90+6'; Peart-Harris (yellow card) 90+6'	Report	House 4'; O'Connor (yellow card) 61'; Plange (yellow card) 85'	Stadium: The Bolt New Lawn; Attendance: 2,707; Referee: Craig Hicks

28 February 2023 32	Lincoln City	1–1	Milton Keynes Dons	Lincoln
19:45 GMT	Mandroiu 5'; House (yellow card) 90+3'	Report	Jules (yellow card) 39'; Maghoma 89'; Leko (yellow card) 90+3'	Stadium: LNER Stadium; Attendance: 7,056; Referee: Seb Stockbridge

4 March 2023 33	Lincoln City	1–0	Oxford United	Lincoln
15:00 GMT	Mandroiu 23' (pen.)	Report	Browne (yellow card) 33'; Moore (yellow card) 87'	Stadium: LNER Stadium; Attendance: 8,092; Referee: Lewis Smith

7 March 2023 34	Cheltenham Town	0–0	Lincoln City	Cheltenham
19:45 GMT	Long (yellow card) 17'; Rea (yellow card) 69'	Report	Diamond (yellow card) 22'	Stadium: Completely-Suzuki Stadium; Attendance: 3,385; Referee: Darren Handley

11 March 2023 35	Exeter City	2–1	Lincoln City	Exeter
15:00 GMT	Nombe 33', 73'; Hartridge (yellow card) 50' (yellow-red card) 85'; Key (yellow card) 69'; Stansfield (yellow card) 72'; Blackman (yellow card) 88'	Report	O'Connor 19' (yellow card) 81'; House (yellow card) 88'	Stadium: St James Park; Attendance: 6,193; Referee: Sunny Gill

18 March 2023 36	Lincoln City	0–3	Peterborough United	Lincoln
13:00 GMT	Mandroiu (yellow card) 22'; O'Connor (yellow card) 59'	Report	Clarke-Harris 28'; Burrows (yellow card) 52'; Taylor 67'; Norburn (yellow card) 73'; Ward 83'	Stadium: LNER Stadium; Attendance: 9,530; Referee: Robert Lewis

25 March 2023 37	Fleetwood Town	2–1	Lincoln City	Fleetwood
15:00 GMT	Jackson 16' (o.g.); Ndaba (yellow card) 57'; Stockley 73'; Earl (yellow card) 88'	Report	Poole 45+5'	Stadium: Highbury Stadium; Attendance: 3,371; Referee: Declan Bourne

1 April 2023 38	Sheffield Wednesday	1–1	Lincoln City	Owlerton, Sheffield
15:00 BST	Smith 12'	Report	Mandroiu 28'	Stadium: Hillsborough; Attendance: 27,903; Referee: Bobby Madden

7 April 2023 39	Lincoln City	2–0	Cheltenham Town	Lincoln
15:00 BST	House 42', 79'	Report		Stadium: LNER Stadium; Attendance: 8,178; Referee: Andrew Kitchen

10 April 2023 40	Plymouth Argyle	0–2	Lincoln City	Plymouth
15:00 BST	Wilson (yellow card) 30'	Report	Shodipo 28'; O'Connor (yellow card) 43'; House 47'; Virtue (yellow card) 56'; Erhahon (yellow card) 58'	Stadium: Home Park; Attendance: 16,298; Referee: Tom Nield

15 April 2023 41	Lincoln City	3–2	Port Vale	Lincoln
15:00 BST	Virtue (yellow card) 4'; Sørensen 11'; Rushworth (red card) 27'; House (yellow card) 34' (goal) 42'; Mandroiu (yellow card) 55'; O'Connor (yellow card) 67'; Jackson 87'; Boyes (yellow card) 90'	Report	Taylor 30' (pen.) (yellow card) 64'; Butterworth 33' (yellow card) 69'; Conlon (red card) 34'; Benning (yellow card) 45+1'; Robinson (yellow card) 47' (yellow-red card) 80'; Pett (yellow card) 67'	Stadium: LNER Stadium; Attendance: 8,290; Referee: David Rock

18 April 2023 42	Lincoln City	0–0	Barnsley	Lincoln
19:45 BST		Report	Kane (yellow card) 19'; Thomas (yellow card) 63'; Andersen (yellow card) 90+1'	Stadium: LNER Stadium; Attendance: 8,715; Referee: Simon Mather

22 April 2023 43	Wycombe Wanderers	0–2	Lincoln City	High Wycombe
15:00 BST		Report	Duffy 7'; Rougham (yellow card) 24'; Plange (yellow card) 38'; Sørensen 71'; Eyoma (yellow card) 82'	Stadium: Adams Park; Attendance: 5,062; Referee: Anthony Backhouse

25 April 2023 44	Lincoln City	0–1	Burton Albion	Lincoln
19:45 BST		Report	Ahadme 79'	Stadium: LNER Stadium; Attendance: 7,645; Referee: Paul Howard

29 April 2023 45	Morecambe	3–2	Lincoln City	Morecambe
15:00 BST	Crowley (yellow card) 45+1'; Stockton 50', 86' (yellow card) 68'; Niasse 66'; Austerfield (yellow card) 82'	Report	Sørensen 30'; Virtue (yellow card) 34' (goal) 48'; Erhahon (yellow card) 74'; Poole (yellow card) 85'	Stadium: Mazuma Stadium; Attendance: 5,769; Referee: Sam Allison

7 May 2023 46	Lincoln City	1–0	Shrewsbury Town	Lincoln
12:00 BST	O'Connor (yellow card) 26'; Virtue 73'; Erhahon (yellow card) 90+1'; Sanders (penalty missed) 90+2'	Report	Dunkley (red card) 89'; Flanagan (yellow card) 90+1'	Stadium: LNER Stadium; Attendance: 9,124; Referee: Andy Haines

=== FA Cup ===
Lincoln City were drawn away to Hendon or Chippenham Town in the first round on 17 October 2022. It was confirmed as Chippenham Town on 18 October.

5 November 2022 First round	Chippenham Town	1–0	Lincoln City	Chippenham
15:00 BST	Mehew (yellow card) 33'; Parsons 44'; Hamilton (yellow card) 56'; Russe (yellow card) 90'	Report	O'Connor (yellow card) 73'; Poole (yellow card) 79'	Stadium: Hardenhuish Park; Attendance: 2,175; Referee: Carl Brook

=== EFL Cup ===
Lincoln were drawn against Doncaster Rovers in the first round on 23 June 2022. The second round draw took place on 10 August 2022 by Clinton Morrison and Michael Gray in which Lincoln were drawn against Barrow. The third round draw took place on 24 August 2022 and Lincoln City were drawn against Bristol City. A trip to Premier League Southampton was next in the fourth round.

9 August 2022 First round	Doncaster Rovers	0–3	Lincoln City	Doncaster
19:45 BST	Ravenhill (yellow card) 45+1'	Report	Kendall 12'; Bishop 47'; Scully 61'	Stadium: Eco-Power Stadium; Attendance: 4,006; Referee: Anthony Backhouse

23 August 2022 Second round	Barrow	2–2 (1–3 p)	Lincoln City	Barrow-in-Furness
19:45 BST	Moyo 13'; Whitfield 87'; Gordon (yellow card) 89'	Report	Scully 8'; Eyoma (yellow card) 15'; Sørensen (yellow card) 18'; Garrick 90+2'	Stadium: Holker Street; Attendance: 3,011; Referee: Simon Mather
	Penalties
	Whitfield (penalty scored); Gordon (penalty missed); Brough (penalty missed); Gotts (penalty missed)		Scully (penalty scored); Sanders (penalty scored); Oakley-Boothe (penalty scored)

8 November 2022 Third round	Bristol City	1–3	Lincoln City	Ashton Gate
19:45 GMT	Low (yellow card) 34'; Conway 80'	Report	Virtue 6'; House 15'; O'Connor 49'	Stadium: Ashton Gate; Attendance: 7,961; Referee: Sam Allison

20 December 2022 Fourth round	Southampton	2–1	Lincoln City	Southampton
19:45 GMT	Adams 25', 74'	Report	Bazunu 2' (o.g.); O'Connor (yellow card) 90+3'	Stadium: St Mary's Stadium; Attendance: 17,385; Referee: Jarred Gillett

=== EFL Trophy ===
The Imps were drawn into Group E of the Northern section alongside Doncaster Rover, Barnsley and a TBC invited club. Newcastle United U21 were later added to the group. In the second round, Lincoln were drawn at home against Morecambe. In the third round, Lincoln were drawn at home against either Mansfield Town or Everton U21. The quarter-final draw was made on 15 December and Lincoln were drawn to face Accrington Stanley.

Pos	Div	Team	Pld	W	PW	PL	L	GF	GA	GD	Pts	Qualification
1	L1	Lincoln City	3	2	0	0	1	6	2	+4	6	Advance to Round 2
2	L1	Barnsley	3	2	0	0	1	6	5	+1	6	Advance to Round 2
3	L2	Doncaster Rovers	3	1	1	0	1	4	5	−1	5	
4	ACA	Newcastle United U21	3	0	0	1	2	0	4	−4	1	

Source: EFL.com

30 August 2022 Group stage	Barnsley	0–3	Lincoln City	Barnsley
19:00 BST	Moon (yellow card) 10'; Norwood (red card) 22'; Hondermarck (yellow card) 73'	Report	Bishop 15', 17'; Sørensen (yellow card) 90+1'; Makama 90+3'	Stadium: Oakwell Stadium; Attendance: 3,121; Referee: Martin Woods

20 September 2022 Group Game 2	Lincoln City	1–2	Doncaster Rovers	Lincoln
19:00 BST	Vernam 49'	Report	Molyneux (yellow card) 13'; Close (yellow card) 34'; Biggins (yellow card) 37'; Hurst 72'; Long 84'	Stadium: LNER Stadium; Attendance: 2,338; Referee: Adam Herczeg

18 October 2022 Group Game 3	Lincoln City	2–0	Newcastle United U21	Lincoln
19:00 BST	Mandroiu 8' (yellow card) 90'; Poole (yellow card) 78'; Draper 84'	Report		Stadium: LNER Stadium; Attendance: 1,693; Referee: Ben Toner

22 November 2022 Round 2	Lincoln City	1–1 (4–3 p)	Morecambe	Lincoln
19:00 GMT	Hopper 53'; Bishop (yellow card) 63'	Report	Love (yellow card) 55'; Stockton 67'	Stadium: LNER Stadium; Attendance: 1,445; Referee: Carl Boyeson
	Penalties
	Diamond (penalty scored); Bishop (penalty scored); Sanders (penalty scored); Poole (penalty scored)		Weir (penalty scored); Stockton (penalty scored); Cooney (penalty scored); Love (penalty missed); Shaw (penalty missed)

13 December 2022 Round 3	Lincoln City	4–2	Everton U21	Lincoln
19:00 GMT	Poole 33'; Diamond 54' (pen.), 90+8'; Roughan 72'	Report	Quirk (yellow card) 34'; Okoronkwo 48'; Cannon 50'; John (yellow card) 67'	Stadium: LNER Stadium; Attendance: 1,306; Referee: Andrew Kitchen

10 January 2023 Quarter-final	Lincoln City	2–2 (1–3 p)	Accrington Stanley	Lincoln
19:00 GMT	Hopper 7', 80'; Mandroiu (yellow card) 45+2'; O'Connor (yellow card) 77'; Jackson (yellow card) 83'	Report	Pressley 36', 73' (pen.), (yellow card) 90+3'; Conneely (yellow card) 89'	Stadium: LNER Stadium; Attendance: 2,304; Referee: Simon Mather
	Penalties
	Diamond (penalty scored); Mandroiu (penalty missed); Sanders (penalty missed); Poole (penalty missed)		Pressley (penalty scored); Coyle (penalty scored); Whalley (penalty missed); McConville (penalty scored)

== Transfers ==
=== In ===
Date	Pos.	Player	Transferred from	Fee	Ref.
1 July 2022	RB	(England) Jay Benn	(England) Halifax Town	Undisclosed	
1 July 2022 (Note: The transfer was announced on 13 June, and would become official on 1 July once his Bradford City contract expired)	CB	(Republic of Ireland) Paudie O'Connor	(England) Bradford City	Free transfer	
1 July 2022 (Note: The transfer was announced on 17 June, and would become official on 1 July once his Bradford City contract expired)	LW	(England) Charles Vernam	(England) Bradford City	Free transfer	
7 July 2022	AM	(Republic of Ireland) Danny Mandroiu	(Republic of Ireland) Shamrock Rovers	Undisclosed	
13 September 2022	CM	(England) Jacob Davenport	(England) Blackburn Rovers	Free transfer	
31 January 2023	LW	(Republic of Ireland) Dylan Duffy	(Republic of Ireland) UCD	Free transfer	
31 January 2023	CM	(Scotland) Ethan Erhahon	(Scotland) St Mirren	Undisclosed	

=== Out ===
Date	Pos.	Player	Transferred to	Fee	Ref.
10 June 2022 (Note: The transfer was announced on 8 June, and would become official on 10 June once the transfer window opened)	RW	(Scotland) Theo Archibald	(England) Leyton Orient	Undisclosed	
30 June 2022	GK	(England) Matt Boylan	(England) Bromley	Released	
30 June 2022	CM	(Scotland) Liam Bridcutt	(England) Blackpool	Rejected contract	
30 June 2022	CF	(England) John Marquis	(England) Bristol Rovers	Released	
30 June 2022	CM	(Scotland) Conor McGrandles	(England) Charlton Athletic	Rejected contract	
30 June 2022	LB	(England) Max Melbourne	(England) Morecambe	Released	
1 July 2022	LB	(England) Cohen Bramall	(England) Rotherham United	Undisclosed	
1 September 2022	FW	(Scotland) Chris Maguire	(England) Hartlepool United	Mutual consent	
1 September 2022	RW	(Republic of Ireland) Anthony Scully	(England) Wigan Athletic	Undisclosed	
6 January 2023	LB	(Scotland) Jamie Robson	(England) Forest Green Rovers	Undisclosed	
13 January 2023	CM	(England) Jacob Davenport	(England) Stockport County	Released	
26 January 2023	CF	(England) Tom Hopper	(England) Colchester United	Undisclosed	

=== Loans in ===
Date	Pos.	Player	From	Until	Ref.
27 June 2022	CM	(England) Tashan Oakley-Boothe	(England) Stoke City	End of Season	
8 July 2022	GK	(England) Carl Rushworth	(England) Brighton & Hove Albion	End of Season	
11 August 2022	RW	(Jamaica) Jordon Garrick	(Wales) Swansea City	5 January 2023 (Note: Jordon Garrick was recalled from his loan on 5 January 2023)	
29 August 2022	LW	(England) Jack Diamond	(England) Sunderland	30 March 2023 (Note: Jack Diamond's loan was terminated by Lincoln on 30 March 2023)	
1 September 2022	CM	(England) Matty Virtue	(England) Blackpool	End of Season	
6 January 2023	LB	(England) Harry Boyes	(England) Sheffield United	End of Season	
14 January 2023	RW	(Republic of Ireland) Olamide Shodipo	(England) Queens Park Rangers	End of Season	
30 January 2023	CF	(England) Luke Plange	(England) Crystal Palace	End of Season	

=== Loans out ===
Date	Pos.	Player	From	Until	Ref.
20 July 2022	GK	(Scotland) Sam Long	(England) Boston United	13 January 2023 (Note: Sam Long was recalled from his loan on 13 January 2023.)	
10 August 2022	CD	(England) Hayden Cann	(England) Gainsborough Trinity	End of season	
12 August 2022	CM	(England) Morgan Worsfold-Gregg	(England) AFC Rushden & Diamonds	4 January 2023 (Note: Morgan Worsfold-Gregg was recalled from his loan on 4 January 2023.)	
12 August 2022	CF	(England) Jovon Makama	(England) Brackley Town	4 January 2023 (Note: Jovon Makama was recalled from his loan on 4 January 2023.)	
15 August 2022	LW	(England) Hakeeb Adelakun	(England) Gillingham	End of season	
19 August 2022	AM	(Republic of Ireland) Billy Brooks	(England) Lincoln United	Work experience	
30 August 2022	CF	(England) Charley Kendall	(England) Sutton United	4 January 2023 (Note: Charley Kendall was recalled from his loan on 4 January 2023.)	
6 January 2023	FW	(England) Tayo Alexander-Tucker	(England) Lincoln United	Work experience	
6 January 2023	CM	(England) Theo Mussell	(England) Lincoln United	Work experience	
26 January 2023	CF	(England) Charley Kendall	(England) Bromley	End of season	
31 January 2023	GK	(Scotland) Sam Long	(England) Bromley	25 March 2023 (Note: Sam Long was recalled from his loan on 25 March 2023.)	
31 January 2023	CF	(England) Freddie Draper	(Republic of Ireland) Drogheda United	End of season	
31 January 2023	RB	(England) Elicha Ahui	(Republic of Ireland) Drogheda United	End of season	
4 February 2023	CM	(Republic of Ireland) Oisin Gallagher	(England) Barwell	Work experience	
4 February 2023	CM	(England) Julian Donnery	(England) Barwell	Work experience	
10 February 2023	RB	(England) Jay Benn	(Republic of Ireland) Bohemians	End of season	
12 February 2023	CB	(England) Nathan Kabeya	(England) Bromsgrove Sporting	12 March 2023	
17 February 2023	CM	(England) Morgan Worsfold-Gregg	(England) Cleethorpes Town	End of season	
17 March 2023	CB	(England) Darryl Powell	(England) Bromsgrove Sporting	End of season	

=== Contracts ===
Date	Pos.	Player	Length	Expiry	Ref.
26 September 2022	FW	(England) Freddie Draper	—	—	
1 February 2023	CM	(Republic of Ireland) Oisin Gallagher	—	—	
23 February 2023	CB	(England) MJ Kamson-Kamara	—	—	
19 April 2023	GK	(England) Jordan Wright	2 years	June 2025	
7 May 2023	CB	(England) Adam Jackson	2 years	June 2025	

== Squad statistics ==
=== Appearances ===
As of 7 May 2023

No.	Pos	Nat	Player	Total		League One		FA Cup		EFL Cup		EFL Trophy	
No.	Pos	Nat	Player	Apps	Goals	Apps	Goals	Apps	Goals	Apps	Goals	Apps	Goals
1	GK	(England) ENG	Carl Rushworth	46	0	42	0	0	0	3	0	1	0
2	DF	(Wales) WAL	Regan Poole	56	3	45	2	1	0	3+1	0	5+1	1
3	DF	(England) ENG	Harry Boyes	18	0	15+3	0	0	0	0	0	0	0
4	DF	(Netherlands) NED	Lewis Montsma	8	0	8	0	0	0	0	0	0	0
5	DF	(England) ENG	Adam Jackson	36	1	26+3	1	0+1	0	3	0	3	0
6	MF	(England) ENG	Max Sanders	42	1	21+12	1	1	0	3+1	0	1+3	0
7	FW	(England) ENG	Charles Vernam	29	1	6+14	0	1	0	3	0	5	1
8	MF	(England) ENG	Tashan Oakley-Boothe	25	0	6+10	0	0+1	0	3	0	4+1	0
9	FW	(England) ENG	Luke Plange	18	0	4+14	0	0	0	0	0	0	0
10	MF	(England) ENG	Teddy Bishop	31	6	19+5	3	1	0	2+1	1	2+1	2
11	FW	(Republic of Ireland) IRL	Olamide Shodipo	20	2	15+5	2	0	0	0	0	0	0
12	MF	(Scotland) SCO	Ethan Erhahon	19	0	18+1	0	0	0	0	0	0	0
15	DF	(Republic of Ireland) IRL	Paudie O'Connor	53	2	44	1	1	0	4	1	4	0
16	DF	(Wales) WAL	Joe Walsh	14	1	9+2	1	0	0	1	0	2	0
18	FW	(Scotland) SCO	Ben House	44	13	35+3	12	0	0	2+1	1	2+1	0
19	MF	(Republic of Ireland) IRL	Danny Mandroiu	29	7	20+5	6	0	0	1	0	3	1
21	MF	(Denmark) DEN	Lasse Sørensen	51	3	29+12	3	1	0	1+2	0	5+1	0
22	DF	(England) ENG	TJ Eyoma	34	0	23+2	0	1	0	3	0	4+1	0
23	MF	(England) ENG	Hakeeb Adelakun	2	0	2	0	0	0	0	0	0	0
24	DF	(Republic of Ireland) IRL	Sean Roughan	40	2	26+6	1	1	0	4	0	2+1	1
26	MF	(England) ENG	Matty Virtue	37	4	27+4	3	0+1	0	2	1	2+1	0
28	FW	(Republic of Ireland) IRL	Dylan Duffy	7	1	4+3	1	0	0	0	0	0	0
29	GK	(England) ENG	Jordan Wright	14	0	4+2	0	1	0	1	0	5+1	0
32	FW	(England) ENG	Jovon Makama	12	1	0+8	0	0	0	0+1	0	0+3	1
36	MF	(England) ENG	Morgan Worsfold-Gregg	1	0	0	0	0	0	0+1	0	0	0
37	MF	(Republic of Ireland) IRL	Oisin Gallagher	2	0	0	0	0	0	0	0	0+2	0
46	FW	(England) ENG	Charley Kendall	5	1	0+3	0	0	0	2	1	0	0
Away on loan
20	DF	(England) ENG	Jay Benn	1	0	0	0	0	0	0	0	1	0
34	FW	(England) ENG	Freddie Draper	3	1	0	0	1	0	0+1	0	0+1	1
38	DF	(England) ENG	Elicha Ahui	1	0	0	0	0	0	0	0	1	0
No longer at the club
9	FW	(England) ENG	Tom Hopper	22	5	10+6	2	0	0	0+2	0	4	3
11	FW	(Republic of Ireland) IRL	Anthony Scully	8	3	5	1	0	0	2	2	0+1	0
14	FW	(Jamaica) JAM	Jordon Garrick	16	1	5+6	0	0	0	0+2	1	2+1	0
17	DF	(Scotland) SCO	Jamie Robson	21	0	10+6	0	1	0	0	0	3+1	0
25	MF	(England) ENG	Jacob Davenport	3	0	0	0	0	0	0+1	0	1+1	0
27	FW	(England) ENG	Jack Diamond	36	8	29+2	6	0	0	0	0	4+1	2
28	FW	(Scotland) SCO	Chris Maguire	3	0	0+2	0	0	0	1	0	0	0

=== Goalscorers ===
As of 7 May 2023

Includes all competitive matches.

Rank	Pos.	Nat.	No.	Player	League One	FA Cup	EFL Cup	EFL Trophy	Total
1	FW	(Scotland)	18	Ben House	12	0	1	0	13
2	FW	(England)	27	Jack Diamond	6	0	0	2	8
3	FW	(Republic of Ireland)	19	Danny Mandroiu	6	0	0	1	7
4	MF	(England)	10	Teddy Bishop	3	0	1	2	6
5	FW	(England)	9	Tom Hopper	2	0	0	3	5
6	MF	(England)	26	Matty Virtue	3	0	1	0	4
7	DF	(Wales)	2	Regan Poole	2	0	0	1	3
7	FW	(Republic of Ireland)	11	Anthony Scully	1	0	2	0	3
7	MF	(Denmark)	21	Lasse Sørensen	3	0	0	0	3
8	FW	(Republic of Ireland)	11	Olamide Shodipo	2	0	0	0	2
8	DF	(Republic of Ireland)	15	Paudie O'Connor	1	0	1	0	2
8	DF	(Republic of Ireland)	24	Sean Roughan	1	0	0	1	2
9	DF	(England)	5	Adam Jackson	1	0	0	0	1
9	MF	(England)	6	Max Sanders	1	0	0	0	1
9	FW	(England)	7	Charles Vernam	0	0	0	1	1
9	FW	(Jamaica)	14	Jordon Garrick	0	0	1	0	1
9	DF	(Wales)	16	Joe Walsh	1	0	0	0	1
9	FW	(Republic of Ireland)	28	Dylan Duffy	1	0	0	0	1
9	FW	(England)	32	Jovon Makama	0	0	0	1	1
9	FW	(England)	34	Freddie Draper	0	0	0	1	1
9	FW	(England)	46	Charley Kendall	0	0	1	0	1
Own goals					1	0	1	0	2
Total					47	0	9	13	69

=== Disciplinary record ===
As of 7 May 2023

No.	Pos.	Name	League One		FA Cup		EFL Cup		EFL Trophy		Total	
No.	Pos.	Name	Booked	Sent off (straight red)	Booked	Sent off (straight red)	Booked	Sent off (straight red)	Booked	Sent off (straight red)	Booked	Sent off (straight red)
18	FW	Ben House	9	1	0	0	0	0	0	0	9	1
16	DF	Joe Walsh	3	1	0	0	0	0	0	0	3	1
1	GK	Carl Rushworth	2	1	0	0	0	0	0	0	2	1
5	DF	Adam Jackson	1	1	0	0	0	0	1	0	2	1
15	DF	Paudie O'Connor	13	0	1	0	1	0	1	0	16	0
26	MF	Matty Virtue	7	0	0	0	0	0	0	0	7	0
19	FW	Danny Mandroiu	4	0	0	0	0	0	2	0	6	0
24	DF	Sean Roughan	6	0	0	0	0	0	0	0	6	0
2	DF	Regan Poole	3	0	1	0	0	0	1	0	5	0
21	MF	Lasse Sørensen	3	0	0	0	1	0	1	0	5	0
22	DF	TJ Eyoma	4	0	0	0	1	0	0	0	5	0
6	MF	Max Sanders	3	0	0	0	0	0	0	0	3	0
27	FW	Jack Diamond	3	0	0	0	0	0	0	0	3	0
9	FW	Tom Hopper	2	0	0	0	0	0	0	0	2	0
9	FW	Luke Plange	2	0	0	0	0	0	0	0	2	0
10	MF	Teddy Bishop	2	0	0	0	0	0	0	0	2	0
17	DF	Jamie Robson	2	0	0	0	0	0	0	0	2	0
3	DF	Harry Boyes	1	0	0	0	0	0	0	0	1	0
7	FW	Charles Vernam	1	0	0	0	0	0	0	0	1	0
8	MF	Tashan Oakley-Boothe	1	0	0	0	0	0	0	0	1	0
12	MF	Ethan Erhahon	1	0	0	0	0	0	0	0	1	0
14	FW	Jordon Garrick	1	0	0	0	0	0	0	0	1	0

=== Clean sheets ===
As of 7 May 2023

No.	Nat.	Player	Matches played	Clean sheet %	League One	FA Cup	EFL Cup	EFL Trophy	Total
1	(England)	Carl Rushworth	46	43.48%	19	0	1	0	20
29	(England)	Jordan Wright	14	28.57%	1	0	0	3	4

== Awards ==
=== Club Player of the Season ===
Player	Ref.
(Republic of Ireland) Paudie O'Connor	

=== Sky Bet League One Player of the Month ===
Month	Player		Ref.
September	(England) Jack Diamond	Nomination	

=== EFL Goal of the Month ===
Month	Player	Goal		Ref
February	(Scotland) Ben House	4' vs Forest Green Rovers, 25 February	Nomination	

=== EFL League Cup Player of the Round ===
Round	Player		Ref.
Round 2	(England) Jordan Wright	Nomination	
