= Regan Poole =

Welsh footballer (born 1998)

Personal information
- Full name: Regan Leslie Poole
- Date of birth: 18 June 1998 (age 28)
- Place of birth: Cardiff, Wales
- Height: 5 ft 11 in (1.80 m)
- Position: Centre-back

Team information
- Current team: Portsmouth
- Number: 5

Youth career
- –2014: Cardiff City
- 2014: Newport County

Senior career*
Years	Team	Apps	(Gls)
2014–2015	Newport County	15	(0)
2015–2019	Manchester United	0	(0)
2017–2018	→ Northampton Town (loan)	22	(0)
2019	→ Newport County (loan)	20	(0)
2019–2021	Milton Keynes Dons	41	(1)
2021–2023	Lincoln City	111	(3)
2023–	Portsmouth	83	(4)

International career^{‡}
2014	Wales U17	6	(0)
2016	Wales U19	3	(0)
2017	Wales U20	3	(0)
2016–2020	Wales U21	23	(0)
2023–	Wales	1	(0)
- * Club domestic league appearances and goals as of 3 September 2026 (UTC) ‡ National team caps and goals as of 21:14, 11 October 2023 (UTC)

Regan Leslie Poole (born 18 June 1998) is a Welsh footballer who plays as a centre back for EFL Championship club Portsmouth and the Wales national team.

== Early life ==
Poole was born in Cardiff and loved playing football from an early age.

== Club career ==
=== Newport County ===
Poole was a member of the Cardiff City academy and joined the Newport County Academy as a scholar in June 2014. In September 2014, he was on trial at Manchester United before he made his debut for the Newport County first team. His Newport County debut came on 20 September 2014, at the age of 16 years and 94 days, when he was named in the starting line-up for a League Two match against Shrewsbury Town which ended in a 0–0 draw. Poole became the youngest Newport County player, surpassing the record set by Steve Aizlewood in 1969. He retained his place for the EFL Trophy first round match against Swindon Town on 23 September 2014. Swindon won the game 2–1. In February 2015, Poole was shortlisted for the Football League Apprentice of the Year award. On 18 May 2015, Poole had a one-week trial with Liverpool.

=== Manchester United ===
On 1 September 2015, Newport County confirmed Poole had joined Premier League club Manchester United for an initial fee of £100,000, potentially rising to £400,000 with future add-ons. It was assumed that Poole would join the club's Academy squad and "possibly be required for Under-21 and UEFA Youth League" matches. On 7 October, it was reported that Poole had yet to receive international clearance to move from Wales to England, and consequently was unable to play in a competitive match for Manchester United. On 1 February 2016, five months after joining Manchester United, Poole received international clearance and was free to play competitive football; that evening he appeared as an 89th-minute substitute for the under-21 side in a 2–0 defeat to Everton.

Poole was included in Manchester United's squad for the knockout phase of the 2015–16 UEFA Europa League and given the number 41 shirt. He was an unused substitute in their last 32 first leg match away to Midtjylland on 18 February; in the home leg a week later he made his United debut as a last-minute substitute for Ander Herrera in a 5–1 win.

=== Loans ===
On 7 July 2017, Poole agreed a season-long loan deal with League One side Northampton Town, where he would reunite with manager Justin Edinburgh, who gave Poole his Newport County debut three years earlier. Poole's debut for Northampton came on 12 August in a 1–0 defeat to Fleetwood Town at Sixfields. While naturally a defender, after the appointment of Jimmy Floyd Hasselbaink as manager on 4 September, Poole featured regularly as a midfielder – a position he has played in for the Manchester United Reserves, first doing so against Wigan Athletic on 19 September.

Poole was a regular in the Manchester United reserve team during the 2018–19 season, but was unable to break into the first team and on 18 January 2019 he returned to Newport County on loan for the remainder of the season. He was part of the team that reached the League Two playoff final at Wembley Stadium on 25 May 2019. Newport lost to Tranmere Rovers, 1-0 after a goal in the 119th minute.

=== Milton Keynes Dons ===
Following his release from Manchester United, on 14 June 2019 Poole signed for newly promoted League One club Milton Keynes Dons on a free transfer on a contract of undisclosed length. On 8 September 2020, Poole scored his first career professional goal in a 3–1 EFL Trophy win over Northampton Town. On 29 December 2020 he scored his first professional league goal in a 4–1 away win over Swindon Town.

=== Lincoln City ===
On 30 January 2021, it was announced that Poole had signed a multi-year contract for Lincoln City for an undisclosed fee. He made his debut less than a week later, coming on as a second-half substitute at Gillingham on 5 February. He scored his first goal for the club on 16 October 2021, a last-minute winner against Charlton Athletic. Following the end 2021-22 season, Poole would be named Lincoln City's Player and Players Player of the Season at the end of season awards. On 10 May 2023, it was announced Poole would be leaving in the clubs retained list, despite the club trying to keep him, Poole wanted to play at a higher level.

=== Portsmouth ===
On 11 July 2023, Poole signed for League One club Portsmouth.

== International career ==
In October 2014, Poole was named in the Wales Under-17 squad for the matches against Russia, Belarus and Montenegro. He was an unused substitute in the first two games, but made his debut in the third against Montenegro in Minsk, when he started the 2–1 win. In November 2015, Poole was named in the Wales under-19 squad for the Euro Under-19 qualifying matches against Georgia, Albania and Austria.

In August 2016, Poole was promoted to the Wales Under-21 squad for the 2017 UEFA European Under-21 Championship matches against Denmark and Luxembourg in September 2016 in place of the injured Lee Evans. In May 2017, Poole was named in the Wales under-20 squad for the 2017 Toulon Tournament. He was named in the starting line-up in all three of Wales' group matches against the Ivory Coast, France and Bahrain as Wales were eliminated in the group stage.

Poole was named in a preliminary senior Wales squad in May 2018 for a friendly against Mexico, but was left out of the final selection. Poole replaced Chris Mepham, who withdrew from injury, in the senior Wales squad for their UEFA Euro 2020 qualifiers against Slovakia and Croatia in October 2019.

On 11 October 2023, he made his senior debut for Wales, starting in a 4–0 friendly win over Gibraltar.

== Career statistics ==
As of 31 January 2026

Appearances and goals by club, season and competition
Club	Season	League			FA Cup		League Cup		Other		Total	
Club	Season	Division	Apps	Goals	Apps	Goals	Apps	Goals	Apps	Goals	Apps	Goals
Newport County	2014–15	League Two	11	0	0	0	0	0	1 (Note: Appearance in Football League Trophy)	0	12	0
Newport County	2015–16	League Two	4	0	—		1	0	—		5	0
Newport County	Total		15	0	0	0	1	0	1	0	17	0
Manchester United	2015–16	Premier League	0	0	0	0	—		1 (Note: Appearance in UEFA Europa League)	0	1	0
Manchester United	2016–17	Premier League	0	0	0	0	0	0	0	0	0	0
Manchester United	2017–18	Premier League	0	0	—		—		—		0	0
Manchester United	2018–19	Premier League	0	0	0	0	0	0	0	0	0	0
Manchester United	Total		0	0	0	0	0	0	1	0	1	0
Northampton Town (loan)	2017–18	League One	22	0	1	0	0	0	1 (Note: Appearance(s) in EFL Trophy)	0	24	0
Newport County (loan)	2018–19	League Two	20	0	3	0	—		3 (Note: Appearances in League Two play-offs)	0	26	0
Milton Keynes Dons	2019–20	League One	19	0	1	0	3	0	2	0	25	0
Milton Keynes Dons	2020–21	League One	22	1	3	0	0	0	3	3	28	4
Milton Keynes Dons	Total		41	1	4	0	3	0	5	3	53	4
Lincoln City	2020–21	League One	22	0	0	0	0	0	3 (Note: Appearances in League One play-offs)	0	25	0
Lincoln City	2021–22	League One	44	1	1	0	1	0	4	0	50	1
Lincoln City	2022–23	League One	45	2	1	0	4	0	6	1	56	3
Lincoln City	Total		111	3	2	0	5	0	13	1	130	4
Portsmouth	2023–24	League One	14	3	1	0	1	0	—		16	3
Portsmouth	2024–25	Championship	27	1	0	0	0	0	—		27	1
Portsmouth	2025–26	Championship	25	0	1	0	1	0	—		27	0
Portsmouth	Total		66	4	2	0	2	0	0	0	70	4
Career total			250	8	11	0	10	0	24	4	295	12

== Honours ==
Portsmouth

- EFL League One: 2023–24

Individual

- Lincoln City Player of the Season: 2021–22
