= Josh Griffiths (footballer) =

English footballer (born 2001)

Personal information
- Full name: Joshua James Griffiths
- Date of birth: 5 September 2001 (age 25)
- Place of birth: Hereford, England
- Height: 6 ft 1 in (1.85 m)
- Position: Goalkeeper

Team information
- Current team: Stoke City
- Number: 24

Youth career
- 2011–2020: West Bromwich Albion

Senior career*
Years	Team	Apps	(Gls)
2020–2026	West Bromwich Albion	40	(0)
2020–2021	→ Cheltenham Town (loan)	44	(0)
2021–2022	→ Lincoln City (loan)	33	(0)
2022–2023	→ Portsmouth (loan)	22	(0)
2024–2025	→ Bristol Rovers (loan)	28	(0)
2026–	Stoke City	0	(0)

International career^{‡}
2019	England U18	1	(0)
2023	England U21	1	(0)
Medal record
Representing England
UEFA European Under-21 Championship
Winner	2023 Georgia–Romania
- * Club domestic league appearances and goals as of 20:47, 25 August 2026 (UTC) ‡ National team caps and goals as of 22:11, 29 March 2023 (UTC)

Joshua James Griffiths (born 5 September 2001) is an English professional footballer who plays as a goalkeeper for EFL Championship club Stoke City.

== Club career ==
=== West Bromwich Albion ===
Griffiths began his career at West Bromwich Albion, signing at the age of 10.

On 13 August 2020, he signed a season-long loan with League Two club Cheltenham Town. Griffiths kept a clean sheet on his professional debut in an EFL Cup 1–0 away win over Peterborough United in September 2020. Griffiths impressed on loan at Cheltenham, winning the club's Young Player of the Season award after keeping 23 clean sheets in 50 appearances as he played his part in a season which saw Cheltenham crowned League Two Champions.

Following his first loan spell, signed a new four-year contract with West Bromwich Albion, keeping him with the club until the summer of 2025. In July 2021 he moved on loan for the 2021–22 season to League One side Lincoln City. He made his Lincoln City debut away to Gillingham on the opening day of the 2021–22 season. On 5 March 2022, he suffered a season-ending ankle injury against Sheffield Wednesday.

On 14 July 2022, Griffiths signed for Portsmouth for the 2022–23 season on a season-long loan. He made his debut for Portsmouth away to Sheffield Wednesday on the opening day of the 2022–23 season, starting in a 3–3 draw. The loan was terminated by West Bromwich Albion on 11 January 2023, following 28 appearances for Portsmouth.

On 15 February 2023, Griffiths made his West Bromwich Albion debut in a 1–1 home draw against Blackburn Rovers.

In June 2024, he signed a new three-year contract.

On 10 July 2024, Griffiths joined League One club Bristol Rovers on a season-long loan deal. Griffiths was recalled by WBA in February 2025, following Alex Palmer's move to Ipswich Town.

=== Stoke City ===
On 25 June 2026, Griffiths joined Championship side Stoke City on a two-year contract for an undisclosed fee.

== International career ==
In March 2019 Griffiths represented the England U18 team against Mexico and later that year was an unused substitute for England U20 in their opening game of the Under 20 Elite League against the Netherlands.

On 15 March 2021, Griffiths received his first England U21 call up as part of the Young Lions squad for the 2021 UEFA European Under-21 Championship. He had to wait two years to make his debut for them however, with his first cap coming on 28 March 2023 in a 2–1 defeat against Croatia.

On 14 June 2023, Griffiths was included in the England squad for the 2023 UEFA European Under-21 Championship; a tournament the Young Lions ultimately went on to win.

== Career statistics ==
As of match played 25 August 2026

Appearances and goals by club, season and competition
Club	Season	League			FA Cup		EFL Cup		Other		Total	
Club	Season	Division	Apps	Goals	Apps	Goals	Apps	Goals	Apps	Goals	Apps	Goals
West Bromwich Albion	2020–21	Premier League	0	0	0	0	0	0	—		0	0
West Bromwich Albion	2021–22	Championship	0	0	0	0	0	0	—		0	0
West Bromwich Albion	2022–23	Championship	10	0	0	0	0	0	—		10	0
West Bromwich Albion	2023–24	Championship	0	0	2	0	1	0	0	0	3	0
West Bromwich Albion	2024–25	Championship	6	0	0	0	0	0	—		6	0
West Bromwich Albion	2025–26	Championship	24	0	2	0	0	0	—		26	0
West Bromwich Albion	Total		40	0	4	0	1	0	0	0	45	0
Cheltenham Town (loan)	2020–21	League Two	44	0	3	0	2	0	1 (Note: Appearances in the EFL Trophy.)	0	50	0
Lincoln City (loan)	2021–22	League One	33	0	0	0	1	0	1	0	35	0
Portsmouth (loan)	2022–23	League One	22	0	3	0	2	0	1	0	28	0
Bristol Rovers (loan)	2024–25	League One	28	0	3	0	1	0	1	0	33	0
Stoke City	2026–27	Championship	0	0	0	0	1	0	—		1	0
Career total			167	0	13	0	8	0	4	0	192	0

== Honours ==
Cheltenham Town

- EFL League Two: 2020–21

England U21

- UEFA European Under-21 Championship: 2023

Individual

- Cheltenham Town Young Player of the Season: 2020–21
