= 2021 EFL League One play-off final =

Association football match

- Wembley Stadium in London hosted the final.
Blackpool	Lincoln City
2	1
- Date: 30 May 2021
- Venue: Wembley Stadium, London
- Referee: Tony Harrington
- Attendance: 9,751
- Weather: Sunny

The 2021 EFL League One play-off final was an association football match which was played on 30 May 2021 at Wembley Stadium, London, to determine the third and final team to gain promotion from EFL League One, the third tier of English football, to the EFL Championship. The top two teams of 2020–21 EFL League One, Hull City and Peterborough United, gained automatic promotion to the Championship, while the clubs placed from third to sixth place in the table took part in the 2021 English Football League play-offs. The winners of the play-off semi-finals competed for the final place for the 2021–22 season in the Championship.

Tony Harrington was the referee for the match, which was played in front of 9,751 spectators. Lincoln City went ahead inside the first minute via an own goal from Blackpool's Ollie Turton. In the 34th minute, Blackpool levelled from Kenny Dougall's low shot from just outside the penalty area. Nine minutes into the second half, Dougall scored his and Blackpool's second goal of the afternoon, with a similar strike to his first, to make it 2–1. That remained the scoreline, and Blackpool gained promotion to the Championship.

== Route to the final ==
EFL League One final table, leading positions
Pos	Team	Pld	W	D	L	GF	GA	GD	Pts
1	Hull City	46	27	8	11	80	38	+42	89
2	Peterborough United	46	26	9	11	83	46	+37	87
3	Blackpool	46	23	11	12	60	37	+23	80
4	Sunderland	46	20	17	9	70	42	+28	77
5	Lincoln City	46	22	11	13	69	50	+19	77
6	Oxford United	46	22	8	16	77	56	+21	74

Blackpool finished the regular 2020–21 season in third place in EFL League One, the third tier of the English football league system, two places and three points ahead of Lincoln City. Both, therefore, missed out on the two automatic places for promotion to the EFL Championship and instead took part in the play-offs to determine the third promoted team. Blackpool finished seven points behind Peterborough United (who were promoted in second place) and nine behind league winners Hull City.

Lincoln City's opposition for their play-off semi-final was Sunderland, with the first match of the two-legged tie taking place at Sincil Bank in Lincoln on 19 May 2021. In a goalless first half, Brennan Johnson came closest to breaking the deadlock but his shot hit the Sunderland post. After the interval, the visitors hit the Lincoln goalframe twice within a minute, before Tom Hopper scored from close range to give Lincoln a 1–0 lead. With 13 minutes to go, Johnson charged down a clearance from Sunderland goalkeeper Lee Burge to score Lincoln's second and they won the match 2–0. The second leg was held three days later at the Stadium of Light in Sunderland. Ross Stewart side-footed the ball into the Lincoln City net after 13 minutes from an Aiden McGeady cross, before Charlie Wyke scored the 31st goal of his season 18 minutes later to make it 2–0 to Sunderland. Hopper scored with a header eleven minutes after half-time to halve the deficit for Lincoln. In the 63rd minute, Josh Scowen's tackle on Conor McGrandles was deemed a foul, but the resulting penalty from Jorge Grant was saved by Burge. The game ended 2–1 to Sunderland but with an aggregate score of 3–2 to Lincoln City, they progressed to the final.

Blackpool faced Oxford United in their semi-final, and the first leg was played at the Kassam Stadium in Oxford on 18 May 2021. Oliver Turton opened the scoring for the visitors midway through the first half when he took advantage of a mis-hit clearance by Josh Ruffels. Ellis Simms doubled Blackpool's lead in the 26th minute. He scored his second with 16 minutes of the match remaining with a low strike past Jack Stevens in the Oxford goal, to give his side a 3–0 victory. The second leg took place three days later at Bloomfield Road in Blackpool. Matty Taylor gave Oxford the lead with a low shot in the seventh minute of the match but Elliot Embleton equalised four minutes later with a curling strike. Kenny Dougall made it 2–1 to Blackpool in the 13th minute, flicking the ball in from Dan Ballard's pass. Rob Atkinson scored seven minutes into the second half, before Jerry Yates put Oxford ahead once again two minutes later. Olamide Shodipo scored in the 74th minute to make it 3–3, which was the final score, and Blackpool progressed to the final with a 6–3 aggregate victory.

== Match ==
=== Background ===
Blackpool had made six previous appearances in finals from eight play-offs, winning five of them, most recently the 2017 EFL League Two play-off final in which they defeated Exeter City 2–1 at Wembley. They had played in League One since that promotion and last played in the Championship in the 2014–15 season. Lincoln City had featured in six play-offs, including five in succession between 2003 and 2007, but only progressed to the final twice, losing on both occasions. They had played in League One since gaining promotion as champions of League Two in the 2018–19 season and have not featured in the second tier of English football since the 1960–61 season. In the matches between the sides during the regular season, Lincoln City won away at Bloomfield Road 3–2 in October 2020 while the return game at Sincil Bank the following April ended in a 2–2 draw. Yates was Blackpool's top scorer during the regular season with 21 goals, while Grant led the scoring for Lincoln City with 13.

Tony Harrington was the referee for the match, assisted by Ian Cooper and Wade Smith, while Jarred Gillett was the fourth official. The final was played in sunny conditions, with Blackpool playing as a 4–4–2 formation while Lincoln City adopted a 4–3–3. The Lincoln City starting lineup was unchanged from the side which ended their play-off semi-final victory over Sunderland. Blackpool were forced to make a change as Simms was injured in training, so Keshi Anderson started and Embleton joined Yates up front. Lincoln City played in their change kit of black shirts, black shorts and black socks while Blackpool wore tangerine shirts, white shorts and tangerine socks.

=== Summary ===
Lincoln City kicked off the match at around 3 p.m. on 30 May 2021 in front of 9,751 supporters, which was limited by the COVID-19 pandemic in the United Kingdom. After less than a minute, Johnson made a run down the right wing and played in a low cross which Chris Maxwell, the Blackpool goalkeeper, missed, and Turton struck the ball into the net for an own goal. Blackpool's Luke Garbutt was shown the yellow card for a late tackle on Johnson. Grant's subsequent free kick was headed over the bar by Joe Walsh. In the 21st minute, Anderson was fouled and Garbutt's free kick was gathered by Alex Palmer in the Lincoln City goal. Five minutes later, Grant's bending strike from the edge of the Blackpool penalty area struck the top of the crossbar. Demetri Mitchell then had two chances to score: his header landed the roof of the Lincoln goal followed by a powerful shot from inside the area which was saved by Palmer. In the 34th minute, Blackpool scored the equaliser. Embleton passed to Dougall whose low shot from just outside the box beat Palmer to make it 1–1. With seven minutes of the half remaining, Lincoln City's Tayo Edun struck from distance but his shot was off-target. Embleton then saw his shot kept out by Palmer before Mitchell header from Garbutt's free kick was also saved by the goalkeeper, and the half ended with the scores level.

Neither side made any changes to their personnel during the interval and Lincoln City kicked off the second half. Three minutes in, Ballard was booked for a pull on Morgan Rogers. In the 51st minute, Kevin Stewart's shot was sliced off-target from 20 yards (18 m). Three minutes later, Dougall scored his and Blackpool's second goal of the afternoon. Yates passed the ball to Dougall whose low shot from the edge of the area made it 2–1. Midway through the half, Lincoln City made their first substitution of the game with Callum Morton coming on in place of Hopper. Liam Bridcutt was then booked for a foul on Johnson before Blackpool's Gary Madine came on as a substitute for Mitchell. In the 74th minute, Yates's attempt to lob Palmer lacked power and was cleared. Three minutes later, Madine headed a Garbutt free kick over the crossbar. With ten minutes of the match remaining, Blackpool made a double-substitution with Grant Ward and CJ Hamilton coming on for Anderson and Embleton. In the 85th minute, Blackpool's James Husband was shown the yellow card for a foul on Morton, and from the resulting free kick, Morton headed the ball over the Lincoln City goal. Rogers's 89th minute strike from more than 20 yards (18 m) went wide of the Blackpool goal. Heading into stoppage time, Blackpool replaced Yates with Jordan Thorniley and three minutes in, Dougall was booked for throwing the ball away to waste time. With seconds remaining, Regan Poole's shot for Lincoln City flew over the Blackpool crossbar and the match ended 2–1 with Blackpool gaining promotion to the Championship.

=== Details ===
30 May 2021
15:00 BST

Blackpool	2–1	Lincoln City
Dougall 34', 54'	Report	Turton 1' (o.g.)

Wembley Stadium, London
Attendance: 9,751
Referee: Tony Harrington

Blackpool	Lincoln City

GK	1	(Wales) Chris Maxwell (c)
RB	20	(England) Ollie Turton
CB	26	(Northern Ireland) Daniel Ballard	(yellow card) 48'
CB	3	(England) James Husband	(yellow card) 84'
LB	29	(England) Luke Garbutt	(yellow card) 8'
CM	39	(England) Kevin Stewart
CM	12	(Australia) Kenny Dougall	(yellow card) 90+2'
RW	15	(England) Demetri Mitchell		(substituted off) 69'
AM	32	(England) Elliot Embleton		(substituted off) 79'
LW	8	(England) Keshi Anderson		(substituted off) 79'
CF	9	(England) Jerry Yates		(substituted off) 90'
Substitutes:
GK	28	(England) Stuart Moore
DF	2	(England) Jordan Lawrence-Gabriel
DF	4	(England) Jordan Thorniley		(substituted on) 90'
DF	21	(England) Marvin Ekpiteta
MF	18	(England) Grant Ward		(substituted on) 79'
MF	22	(England) CJ Hamilton		(substituted on) 79'
FW	14	(England) Gary Madine		(substituted on) 69'
Head Coach:
(England) Neil Critchley

GK	1	(England) Alex Palmer
RB	2	(Wales) Regan Poole
CB	22	(England) TJ Eyoma
CB	16	(Wales) Joe Walsh		(substituted off) 88'
LB	7	(England) Tayo Edun
CM	23	(Scotland) Liam Bridcutt (c)	(yellow card) 66'
CM	18	(Scotland) Conor McGrandles
CM	10	(England) Jorge Grant		(substituted off) 80'
RW	20	(Wales) Brennan Johnson
CF	9	(England) Tom Hopper		(substituted off) 63'
LW	27	(England) Morgan Rogers
Substitutes:
GK	31	(Scotland) Sam Long
DF	4	(Netherlands) Lewis Montsma		(substituted on) 88'
DF	15	(England) Cohen Bramall
MF	6	(England) Max Sanders
MF	26	(England) Harry Anderson
FW	11	(Republic of Ireland) Anthony Scully		(substituted on) 80'
FW	19	(England) Callum Morton		(substituted on) 63'
Manager:
(England) Michael Appleton

Statistics
	Blackpool	Lincoln City
Possession	47%	53%
Goals scored	2	1
Shots on target	7	0
Shots off target	4	7
Fouls committed	14	12
Corner kicks	3	6
Yellow cards	4	1
Red cards	0	0

== Post-match ==
Turton's early strike was the fastest own goal ever scored in a club fixture at Wembley. After the game he remarked of it that "I just thought it's the worst thing that could ever happen" but that his side "put in a great shift and we're deserved winners". The Blackpool manager Neil Critchley said that the own goal was "how not to start a play-off final" but that his team "stayed calm and we played our way back into the game". His counterpart Michael Appleton, former manager of the victors, agreed the early goal for Lincoln City meant his side "got off to a fantastic start" but was gracious in defeat, conceding that the "better side on the day won the game – they earned the right to win the game, I'm not sure if we did."

Blackpool's victory marked their sixth promotion gained via the play-offs, more than any other club in the history of the post-season matches.
