= 2020–21 Blackpool F.C. season =

English football club season

Blackpool
2020–21 season
- Owner and chairman: Simon Sadler
- Head coach: Neil Critchley
- Stadium: Bloomfield Road
- League One: 3rd (promoted via play-offs)
- FA Cup: Fourth round
- EFL Cup: First round
- EFL Trophy: Second round
- Top goalscorer: League: Jerry Yates (20 goals); All: Jerry Yates (23 goals)
Home colours	Away colours	Third colours

The 2020–21 Blackpool F.C. season was the club's 112th season in the English Football League, and their fourth-consecutive season in League One, the third tier of the Football League. The season covers the period from 1 July 2020 to 30 June 2021.

Along with competing in League One, the club also participated in the FA Cup. They were knocked out of the EFL Cup in the first round and the EFL Trophy in the second round. In the third round of the FA Cup, Blackpool defeated Premier League side West Bromwich Albion on penalties, giving the Seasiders a first FA Cup win over top-flight opposition since they beat Burnley 45 years prior. They were knocked out by Brighton in the following round.

The club finished third in League One and won promotion to the EFL Championship via the play-offs after a six-year absence.

It was head coach Neil Critchley's first full season in charge.

== Pre-season ==
On 12 June, the club announced their retained list. Eight players were released: goalkeeping trio Myles Boney, Mark Howard and Christoffer Mafoumbi, defender Sean Graham, midfielders Yusifu Ceesay and Sean Scannell, and forwards Armand Gnanduillet and Owen Watkinson. Club captain Jay Spearing turned down a new contract and also departed.

Goalkeeper Chris Maxwell signed a new two-year contract on 16 June.

On 17 June, head coach Neil Critchley brought in Mike Garrity to be his assistant. Garrity left Liverpool, whose Academy he had been working in since 2007.

Keshi Anderson, a forward, became the first arrival at the club on 29 June.

18-year-old Cameron Antwi signed his first professional contract on 3 July – a one-year deal, with the club having the option to extend for a second year. He had been in the club's academy.

24-year-old centre-back Marvin Ekpiteta joined on a free transfer on 8 July, having let his contract with Leyton Orient run out. He signed a two-year contract, with the club having an option to extend for a further year.

The following day, Montenegrin midfielder Oliver Sarkic signed on a free transfer.

Forward Jerry Yates joined from Rotherham United for an undisclosed fee on 21 July. He was joined the next day by Mansfield Town winger CJ Hamilton, who signed a three-year contract. The club's fifth signing of the close season, the fee was undisclosed.

Forward Ryan Hardie returned to Plymouth Argyle on loan, this time for the season, having had a successful spell there last season. He made the move permanent on 29 January.

Another forward, 16-year-old Tony Weston, joined Rangers on 31 July.

Centre-back Ryan Edwards joined Dundee United on 3 August.

On 6 August, midfielder Ethan Robson signed. He was a free agent, having left Sunderland after sixteen years. Forward Nathan Delfouneso joined Bolton Wanderers, managed by his former Seasiders teammate Ian Evatt, the same day.

Left-back Calum Macdonald joined Tranmere Rovers on a season-long loan on 19 August. He made the move permanent on 1 February.

Another midfielder, Jordan Williams, signed on a free transfer on 24 August. He left to join Ian Evatt's Bolton Wanderers on transfer-deadline day.

On 25 August, former Manchester United Academy goalkeeper Alex Fojtíček joined. He had played a few pre-season friendlies on trial for Blackpool.

On 28 August, forward Adi Yussuf joined Wrexham on a season-long loan. His loan was cut short, with his returning to Bloomfield Road on 1 February, but he went back out on loan the following day, to Chesterfield.

=== Results ===
On 8 August, Blackpool made the short trip down the coast to play Southport to kick-off their pre-season campaign — their first fixture in 151 days. Grant Ward opened the scoring in the first half, before further second-half strikes from Sullay Kaikai and debutant pair Keshi Anderson and Jerry Yates sealed a 4–0 victory for Neil Critchley's side.

Seven days later, Blackpool travelled to Vale Park to take on Port Vale. A Sullay Kaikai goal two minutes before half-time was cancelled out early in the second half by Scott Burgess. Keshi Anderson, like Kaikai, scored his second goal of pre-season to restore the visitors' lead.

Barrow visited Bloomfield Road on 18 August. Jordan Thorniley put the hosts ahead on 38 minutes. Dior Angus levelled for David Dunn's men with 20 minutes left, before Matty Virtue restored Blackpool's lead after 81 minutes.

Premier League Everton made the short trip to the Fylde Coast on 22 August. The hosts went 3–0 up inside 12 minutes through goals by CJ Hamilton, Sullay Kaikai and Grant Ward. Everton replied before half-time with goals from Dominic Calvert-Lewin and Gylfi Sigurdsson. Sigurdsson got a second after the break to make it 3–3, which is how the match finished.

Blackpool fell to a 3–2 defeat at home to Blackburn Rovers on 25 August. Matty Virtue scored Blackpool's goal, making the score 1–2 late in the first half.

A planned friendly against Oldham Athletic was cancelled due to Blackpool's involvement in the EFL Cup.

A final friendly took place at Anfield against Liverpool on 5 September. Blackpool went 2–0 up inside 34 minutes, through CJ Hamilton and a penalty from Jerry Yates, before Joël Matip pulled one back two minutes before the break. Sadio Mané levelled for the hosts on 52 minutes. Two minutes later Roberto Firmino put Liverpool ahead for the first time. Harvey Elliott made it 4–2 on 69 minutes, and Takumi Minamino added a fifth three minutes later. Divock Origi made it 6–2 with five minutes remaining. Sepp van den Berg scored Liverpool's seventh on 88 minutes.

==== In detail ====
8 August 2020 Friendly	Southport	0–4	Blackpool	Southport, England
15:00 BST		Report	Ward; Kaikai; Anderson; Yates	Stadium: Pure Stadium; Attendance: 0

15 August 2020 Friendly	Port Vale	1–2	Blackpool	Burslem, England
15:00 BST	Burgess 51'	Report	Kaikai 43'; Anderson 54'	Stadium: Vale Park

18 August 2020 Friendly	Blackpool	2–1	Barrow	Blackpool, England
13:00 BST	Thorniley 38'; Virtue 82'	Report	Angus 70'	Stadium: Bloomfield Road; Attendance: 0

22 August 2020 Friendly	Blackpool	3–3	Everton	Blackpool, England
15:00 BST	Hamilton 2'; Kaikai 10'; Ward 11'	Report	Calvert-Lewin 23'; Sigurðsson 30' (pen.), 72'	Stadium: Bloomfield Road; Attendance: 0

25 August 2020 Friendly	Blackpool	1–3	Blackburn Rovers	Blackpool, England
19:00 BST	Virtue 38'	Report	Brereton 4', 28'; Dolan 88'	Stadium: Bloomfield Road; Attendance: 0

29 August 2020 Friendly	Oldham Athletic	Cancelled	Blackpool	Oldham, England
15:00 BST				Stadium: Boundary Park; Attendance: 0

5 September 2020 Friendly	Liverpool	7–2	Blackpool	Liverpool, England
15:00 BST	Matip 43'; Mané 52'; Firmino 54'; Elliott 69'; Minamino 72'; Origi 85' van den Berg 88'	Report	Hamilton 15'; Yates 33' (pen.)	Stadium: Anfield; Attendance: 0

== Season proper ==
=== August ===
Blackpool's season opened with an EFL Cup first-round tie with Stoke City at the Britannia Stadium on 29 August. The match finished goalless after 90 minutes and went to penalties, with Stoke being the victors 5–4.

Striker Joe Nuttall was loaned out to Northampton Town for the season on 31 August.

=== September ===
September began with another new signing, with forward Bez Lubala joining, for an undisclosed fee, from Crawley Town.

Midfielder Ben Garrity joined Oldham Athletic on loan for the season on 2 September.

The following day, midfielder Dan Kemp joined on a season-long loan from West Ham United. He was recalled by the Premier League club on 15 January.

The arrival of left-back Demetri Mitchell on 4 September made it four transactions in as many days, and brought the Seasiders' number of incomings for the season to eleven.

Blackpool and Barrow played out a goalless draw in the EFL Trophy on 8 September. Blackpool won the penalty shootout 5–3, however, thus gaining a bonus point.

Blackpool opened their League campaign at Plymouth Argyle on 12 September. They lost to Luke Jephcott's headed goal on three minutes.

Last season's Player of the Year Liam Feeney was loaned out to Tranmere Rovers for the season on 17 September.

Swindon Town visited the seaside on 19 September. A first-half double from CJ Hamilton gave the Seasiders the three points.

Left-back Luke Garbutt joined on a free transfer on 22 September, having left Everton.

A 2–0 defeat at Gillingham seven days later dropped Blackpool down to 13th.

=== October ===
Midfielder Nathan Shaw joined AFC Fylde on loan on 2 October. Initially intended to be until the end of the season, he returned in January after AFC Fylde's season was put on hold due to COVID-19.

Blackpool hosted Lincoln City on 3 October. CJ Hamilton put the Tangerines ahead on 17 minutes, before the first of two goals from Jorge Grant brought matters level on 24 minutes, via the penalty spot. Demetri Mitchell scored his first goal for Blackpool on 82 minutes, restoring their lead, but another penalty from Grant levelled proceedings again three minutes later. James Husband was sent off a minute earlier. Lewis Montsma scored what proved to be the winner on 88 minutes. Blackpool dropped to 21st place with the defeat.

On 5 October, Icelandic defender Daníel Leó Grétarsson joined the club from Aalesunds, while defender/midfielder Daniel Ballard joined on loan from Arsenal until January.

The following day, Blackpool drew 1–1 with Accrington Stanley in the EFL Trophy, but they missed out on a bonus point by losing in the subsequent penalty shootout. Keshi Anderson opened his scoring account for the Seasiders.

On 9 October, Michael Nottingham left the club, joining recent opponents Accrington Stanley.

The following day, Ipswich Town visited Bloomfield Road and returned south with all three points after a 4–1 victory. Luke Chambers put them ahead on 16 minutes, before Gwion Edwards and Teddy Bishop made it 3–0 at half-time. Gary Madine, with his first goal of the season, pulled one back for the Seasiders on the hour mark. Edwards scored his second with ten minutes remaining. Blackpool's fourth defeat in their opening five League games, they dropped one place to 22nd.

Transfer deadline day, 16 October, saw two arrivals and one departure. Out, on loan to Newport County, went midfielder Jamie Devitt. Inbound were forward Ben Woodburn, on loan from Liverpool, and Australian midfielder Kenny Dougall, on a free transfer.

On 17 October, Blackpool ended their run of defeats with a 1–1 draw at Crewe Alexandra, Blackpool manager Neil Critchley's first club of his short playing career. Mikael Mandron opened the scoring for the Railwaymen on 54 minutes. Grant Ward scored his first goal of the campaign to bring the visitors level on 71 minutes.

Charlton Athletic returned south with all three points after a single-goal victory at Bloomfield Road on 20 October. James Husband was sent off inside two minutes for the hosts, for whom it was a fifth defeat in their first seven League fixtures.

Blackpool travelled to Burton Albion on 31 October. A Jerry Yates double, either side of Daníel Leó Grétarsson's own goal, gave the Tangerines all three points. They climbed to 16th place with the victory.

=== November ===
On 3 November, Blackpool beat Wigan by a single Sullay Kaikai goal. The victory lifted them to 12th.

Five days later, the Seasiders made it into the hat for the second-round draw of the FA Cup with a 3–0 win at Eastbourne Borough, the biggest game in the hosts' history.

Blackpool made it four consecutive victories, and their fifth in six, with a 3–0 scoreline at home to Leeds United Under-21s in the EFL Trophy on 11 November. Midfielders Rob Apter and Cameron Antwi made their professional debuts in the tie.

After a ten-day break, Blackpool travelled to Peterborough United, and returned with all three points in a 2–1 victory, extending their winning streak to five. Jerry Yates put the visitors in the lead on 19 minutes. Frankie Kent levelled for Posh on 84 minutes, but Gary Madine scored a winner in the first minute of added time. Manager Neil Critchley dedicated the win to the club's Academy Manager Warren Green, who died the previous day, aged 46.

Doncaster Rovers brought Blackpool's winning run to an end on 24 November, coming from 0–2 down with three second-half goals. Jerry Yates had opened the scoring for the visitors from the penalty spot, making himself the club's top goal scorer, with five in all competitions, in the process. CJ Hamilton doubled the lead, only for Blackpool to concede goals on 48, 52 and (again from the penalty spot) 76 minutes.

November ended with a passage into the third round of the FA Cup, after a 4–0 victory at Harrogate Town on the 28th. A Mark Beck own goal put the visitors ahead five minutes into the second half. Grant Ward doubled the lead five minutes later. Jordan Gabriel netted his first goal for Blackpool on 85 minutes, before Dan Kemp made it four two minutes into added time.

=== December ===
Blackpool won with a single-goal scoreline against Portsmouth at Bloomfield Road on 1 December. Keshi Anderson scored the goal on 64 minutes. Blackpool climbed to 12th place with the three points. Earlier in the day, Cameron Antwi joined Southport on loan until 17 January.

They made it eight wins from their last nine matches on 5 December, with a 1–0 edging of Fylde Coast rivals Fleetwood Town at Highbury Stadium. Gary Madine scored the goal on 16 minutes, his fifth in all competitions this season. Blackpool remained in 12th place.

The two sides met again three days later at the same venue in the knockout stage of the EFL Trophy. Fleetwood won 5–4 on penalties.

Oxford United visited the seaside on 12 December and returned south with a point after a goalless draw. Blackpool dropped one place to 13th.

League leaders Hull City travelled to Bloomfield Road three days later. Mallik Wilks put the visitors ahead on 38 minutes. Jerry Yates equalised in first-half injury time. Keshi Anderson put the Seasiders ahead for the first time on 66 minutes. Reece Burke brought matters level again in the final minute of normal time, but CJ Hamilton scored the winner three minutes into stoppage time. Blackpool climbed one place to 12th, and had won nine of their last twelve matches.

A goalless draw followed, at Accrington Stanley on 19 December. Blackpool remained 12th.

Goalkpeeper Sam Walker joined on an emergency seven-day loan on 23 December, as cover for Chris Maxwell, who tested positive for COVID-19.

Blackpool's home fixture against Rochdale on 26 December was postponed after a COVID-19 outbreak in the visitors' ranks.

A defeat, Blackpool's first in the League since 24 November, occurred at Shrewsbury Town on 29 December. Blackpool remained 12th.

=== January ===
Blackpool began the new year with a 2–1 defeat at Bristol Rovers on 2 January. Gary Madine had put the Tangerines ahead on eight minutes, but two goals in as many minutes ten minutes before the break were enough to give Rovers the victory. Blackpool dropped one place in the table to 13th.

Seven days later, Blackpool secured a place in the fourth round of the FA Cup at the expense of former Seasiders manager Sam Allardyce's West Bromwich Albion. Jerry Yates put Blackpool ahead five minutes before half-time. Semi Ajayi levelled for West Brom seven minutes into the second half. Gary Madine scored his seventh goal of the season on 66 minutes to put the hosts ahead again, but Matheus Pereira equalised ten minutes from the end of normal time. Blackpool won 3–2 on penalties after extra time.

On 16 January, Blackpool travelled to Hull City and came away with a 1–1 draw. Jerry Yates scored his sixth League goal, making him the club's top scorer in all competitions, with eight. Blackpool dropped one place to 14th.

Midfielder Jamie Devitt was released by the club on 19 January. He had not been part of the club's squad.

Blackpool's FA Cup run ended at the fourth-round stage after a 2–1 defeat at Brighton on 23 January. The Tangerines were without five first-team players, after they tested positive for COVID-19. Earlier in the day, midfielder Kevin Stewart joined on a free transfer.

Three days later, Blackpool travelled to Wigan Athletic and won 5–0. The goals came from Marvin Ekpiteta, Jerry Yates, Matty Virtue and two from Everton loanee Ellis Simms.

=== February ===
On 1 February, transfer-deadline day, Blackpool loaned out defender Teddy Howe to Scunthorpe United and forward Oliver Sarkic to Mansfield Town.

The next day, Blackpool hosted Northampton Town. Marvin Ekpiteta and Jerry Yates scored as the Tangerines took all three points.

A 2–0 defeat followed on 6 February at Ipswich Town, leaving Blackpool in 13th place in the table.

After two consecutive postponements, Blackpool returned to action with a home victory over Rochdale. Sullay Kaikai scored the only goal of the game.

A trip to Portsmouth followed on 20 February. Jerry Yates scored his 11th goal of the campaign on 82 minutes to give the visitors the three points, which lifted them up to 13th place in the table.

The planned 23 February fixture at home to Doncaster Rovers was postponed due to a waterlogged pitch.

Blackpool won 3–0 at Charlton Athletic on 27 February. Jerry Yates, with two penalties, brought his goal tally for the season to thirteen. Matty Virtue scored the other goal. The Addicks had two players sent off. It was their fifth win (each with a clean sheet) in their last six League games.

=== March ===
On 2 March, Blackpool hosted Crewe Alexandra. Dan Ballard scored his first goal for the hosts on 41 minutes. Stephen Walker levelled for the Railwaymen four minutes from the end of normal time, and the match (which had ten minutes of injury time, due to an injury to an official) ended 1–1. It was the first goal Blackpool had conceded in nearly six hours of football.

The same scoreline followed against AFC Wimbledon four days later.

Blackpool recorded another clean-sheet victory at MK Dons on 9 March. Jerry Yates scored the only goal of the game, his 14th in all competitions. It was Blackpool's sixth clean sheet in the last nine games.

A goalless draw followed in a Fylde coast derby with Fleetwood Town at Bloomfield Road on 13 March.

Blackpool recorded their fourth draw in five games at home to Burton Albion on 16 March. Luke Garbutt scored his first goal for the Tangerines.

On 20 March, Blackpool recorded a 2–0 victory at Oxford United, with the goals coming from Kenny Dougall (his first for the club) and Dan Ballard. The victory lifted Blackpool to tenth place.

Peterborough United visited the seaside three days later. Blackpool won 3–1, with two goals by Jerry Yates and one from Luke Garbutt, extending their unbeaten run to ten games, and climbed into the top six for the first time. They stayed in those positions for the remainder of the season.

Plymouth returned to the south coast with a point after a 2–2 draw on 27 March. Ryan Hardie, who left Blackpool for the Pilgrims earlier in the season, put the visitors ahead on 12 minutes. Sullay Kaikai equalised two minutes into the second half. Jerry Yates put Blackpool ahead from the penalty spot on 64 minutes, but Joe Edwards levelled matters again in injury time.

=== April ===
A visit to Swindon Town on 2 April ended with three points after a 2–0 win. Ellis Simms scored the first goal a minute before the break, and Jerry Yates scored the second just after the hour mark.

Blackpool faced Gillingham at Bloomfield Road on 5 April. The Seasiders won 4–1, with two goals from Jerry Yates (on 5' and 20', bringing his season total to 20 in all competitions) and one each from Sullay Kaikai (30') and Elliot Embleton (61'), his first for the club. Jordan Graham scored for the Gills, the equaliser at the time. It was Blackpool's tenth win in their last 16 games and lifted them one place to fifth in the table.

Two straight draws followed — 2–2 at Lincoln City on 10 April and, three days later, at home to Accrington Stanley.

Blackpool won their fifth match out of their last eight on 17 April with a single–goal scoreline at home to Sunderland.

The club's first league defeat in two-and-a-half months occurred at Rochdale on 20 April. Blackpool remained fifth in the table despite the defeat.

Another defeat followed four days later at home to Shrewsbury Town.

A league double over Sunderland was completed in ten days with a single-goal victory at the Stadium of Light. Sullay Kaikai got the goal. Blackpool climbed one place in the table, to fifth.

=== May ===
A 3–0 victory at Northampton Town began the final month of the campaign. Luke Garbutt opened the scoring, and Jerry Yates got two more, bringing his season's total to 22. Blackpool remained fifth.

Blackpool secured a place in the play-offs on 4 May after a 2–0 home victory over Doncaster Rovers. It was their third-successive clean sheet, and the 21st of their 45 League fixtures, which resulted in Chris Maxwell winning the League One EFL Golden Glove for the 2020–21 season. An Ellis Simms double gave the Tangerines the three points, and lifted them to third in the table.

A fourth-consecutive win and clean sheet followed on 9 May in a single–goal match at home to Bristol Rovers. Ellis Simms got the goal. Blackpool secured third place, and were drawn against Oxford United in the play-off semi-finals. Their League record was: played 46, won 23, drew 11, lost 12 (80 points). Goals for 60, goals against 37, resulting in a goal-difference of +23.

Blackpool won the first leg of the play-off semi-finals, at Oxford United on 18 May, 3–0, with a goal from Ollie Turton and a double from Ellis Simms. The second leg, at Bloomfield Road on 21 May, finished 3–3. The hosts' goals came from Elliot Embleton, Kenny Dougall and Jerry Yates. Blackpool progressed to the play-off final 6–3 on aggregate.

In the Final, on 30 May, Blackpool beat Lincoln City 2–1, to seal a return to the second tier after a six-year absence. Kenny Dougall scored both of Blackpool's goals, after Ollie Turton scored a first-minute own goal to give the Imps the lead. It was Blackpool's sixth victory in a play-off final in eight such appearances.

=== June ===
On 3 June, the club announced its retained list. New contracts were offered to Cameron Antwi (signed), James Husband (signed), Luke Garbutt (signed), Gary Madine (signed), Stuart Moore (signed) and Nathan Shaw (declined). Contract options were exercised on Ben Garrity and Grant Ward. (Garrity joined Port Vale on 4 June.) Released were Liam Feeney, Alex Fojticek, Sullay Kaikai, Jack Sims and Adi Yussuf. Ollie Turton rejected a new contract and joined Huddersfield Town.

On 8 June, Blackpool made three new signings, all of whom officially joined on 1 July: defender Reece James, goalkeeper Daniel Grimshaw and Northern Ireland international striker Shayne Lavery. Blackpool included an option on all three players to extend their contracts by twelve months.

Eleven days later, right winger Josh Bowler agreed to join the club on 1 July after leaving Everton.

Centre-back Oliver Casey signed from Leeds United on a three-year contract on 22 June. The move became official on 1 July.

Versatile defender/midfielder Callum Connolly agreed to join the Seasiders on 24 June. He also completed the move on 1 July, after his contract with Everton expired.

Kevin Stewart and Cameron Antwi signed new contracts with the club on 30 June.

=== Competitions ===
==== EFL League One ====
===== League table =====
Pos	Team	Pld	W	D	L	GF	GA	GD	Pts	Promotion, qualification or relegation
1	Hull City (C, P)	46	27	8	11	80	38	+42	89	Promotion to the EFL Championship
2	Peterborough United (P)	46	26	9	11	83	46	+37	87	Promotion to the EFL Championship
3	Blackpool (O, P)	46	23	11	12	60	37	+23	80	Qualification for League One play-offs
4	Sunderland	46	20	17	9	70	42	+28	77	Qualification for League One play-offs
5	Lincoln City	46	22	11	13	69	50	+19	77	Qualification for League One play-offs
6	Oxford United	46	22	8	16	77	56	+21	74	Qualification for League One play-offs
7	Charlton Athletic	46	20	14	12	70	56	+14	74	
8	Portsmouth	46	21	9	16	65	51	+14	72	

Source: EFL Official Website
Rules for classification: 1) Points; 2) Goal difference; 3) Number of goals scored; 4) Head-to-head results; 5) Wins; 6) Away goals; 7) Penalty points (sec 9.5); 8) 12-point sending off offences
(C) Champions; (O) Play-off winners; (P) Promoted

===== Results =====
====== In summary ======
Overall								Home						Away					
Pld	W	D	L	GF	GA	GD	Pts	W	D	L	GF	GA	GD	W	D	L	GF	GA	GD
46	23	11	12	60	37	+23	80	12	7	4	30	18	+12	11	4	8	30	19	+11

Last updated: 9 May 2021.
Source: BBC

====== In detail ======
Win Draw Loss Postponed

The 2020–21 season fixtures were released on 21 August.

By 23 February, seven Blackpool matches had been postponed — four due to the weather, three because of COVID-19 outbreaks. The weather-related postponements were all at Bloomfield Road: Northampton Town (waterlogged pitch), Burton Albion, Peterborough United (both frozen pitches) and Doncaster Rovers (waterlogged pitch). The COVID-19 outbreaks forced the postponements of the matches against Sunderland, Rochdale and Burton Albion.

12 September 2020 1	Plymouth Argyle	1–0	Blackpool	Plymouth
15:00 BST	Jephcott 3'	Report		Stadium: Home Park; Referee: Kevin Johnson

19 September 2020 2	Blackpool	2–0	Swindon Town	Blackpool
15:00 BST	Hamilton 41', 47'	Report		Stadium: Bloomfield Road; Attendance: Limited; Referee: Andy Haines

26 September 2020 3	Gillingham	2–0	Blackpool	Gillingham
15:00 BST	Samuel 4', 49'	Report	Kaikai (yellow card) 75'; Robson (yellow card) 81'; Ekpiteta (yellow card) 84'	Stadium: Priestfield Stadium; Attendance: 0 Referee: Lee Swabey

3 October 2020 4	Blackpool	2–3	Lincoln City	Blackpool
15:00 BST	Hamilton 17'; Lubala (yellow card) 60'; Mitchell 82'; Husband (red card) 84'	Report	Grant 24' (pen.), 85' (pen.) (yellow card) 81'; Montsma 88'	Stadium: Bloomfield Road; Attendance: 0 Referee: Thomas Bramall

10 October 2020 5	Blackpool	1–4	Ipswich Town	Blackpool
15:00 BST	Robson (yellow card) 37'; Lawrence-Gabriel (yellow card) 45+2'; Madine 60'	Report	Chambers 16'; Edwards 36', 80'; Bishop 45'; Kenlock (yellow card) 50'; Dozzell (yellow card) 67'	Stadium: Bloomfield Road; Attendance: 0 Referee: Chris Sarginson

17 October 2020 6	Crewe Alexandra	1–1	Blackpool	Crewe
15:00 BST	Mandron 54'; Murphy (yellow card) 78'; Beckles (yellow card) 83'	Report	Turton (yellow card) 45'; Yates (yellow card) 69'; Ward 71'	Stadium: Gresty Road; Attendance: 0 Referee: Peter Wright

20 October 2020 7	Blackpool	0–1	Charlton Athletic	Blackpool
19:00 BST	Husband (red card) 2'	Report	Purrington (yellow card) 5' (yellow-red card) 39'; Watson (yellow card) 65'; Aneke 83'; Amos (yellow card) 90+7'	Stadium: Bloomfield Road; Attendance: 0 Referee: James Bell

24 October 2020 8	Blackpool	1–0	Milton Keynes Dons	Blackpool
15:00 BST	Kaikai (yellow card) 47' (goal) 66'; Ekpiteta (yellow card) 90+4'	Report	Kasumu (yellow card) 15'; Keogh (yellow card) 90+5'	Stadium: Bloomfield Road; Attendance: 0 Referee: Marc Edwards

27 October 2020 9	AFC Wimbledon	1–0	Blackpool	Shepherd's Bush
19:00 GMT	Reilly 13'; Palmer (yellow card) 88'	Report	Ekpiteta (yellow card) 31'; Robson (red card) 38'; Ballard (red card) 75'	Stadium: Kiyan Prince Foundation Stadium; Attendance: 0 Referee: Sam Purkiss

31 October 2020 10	Burton Albion	1–2	Blackpool	Burton upon Trent
15:00 GMT	Quinn (yellow card) 39'; Grétarsson 63' (o.g.); Gilligan (yellow card) 77'	Report	Yates 21', 75' (pen.); Maxwell (yellow card) 40'	Stadium: Pirelli Stadium; Attendance: 0 Referee: Declan Bourne

3 November 2020 11	Blackpool	1–0	Wigan Athletic	Blackpool
19:00 GMT	Kaikai 47'	Report		Stadium: Bloomfield Road; Attendance: 0 Referee: Ben Toner

21 November 2020 12	Peterborough United	1–2	Blackpool	Peterborough
15:00 GMT	Butler (yellow card) 66'; Clarke-Harris (yellow card) 68'; Dembélé (yellow card) 81'; Kent 84'	Report	Yates 19'; Husband (yellow card) 31'; Dougall (yellow card) 44'; Madine 90'	Stadium: Weston Homes Stadium; Attendance: 0 Referee: Ollie Yates

24 November 2020 13	Doncaster Rovers	3–2	Blackpool	Doncaster
19:00 GMT	John 48'; James 52'; Sims (yellow card) 59'; Halliday (yellow card) 66'; Whiteman 76' (pen.)	Report	Yates 10' (pen.); Hamilton 38'; Grétarsson (yellow card) 68'	Stadium: Keepmoat Stadium; Referee: Ross Joyce

1 December 2020 14	Blackpool	1–0	Portsmouth	Blackpool
19:00 GMT	Ballard (yellow card) 64'; Anderson 64'; Madine (yellow card) 90+2'; Kaikai (yellow card) 90+6'	Report	Marquis (yellow card) 79'; Brown (yellow card) 81'	Stadium: Bloomfield Road; Attendance: 0 Referee: Josh Smith

5 December 2020 15	Fleetwood Town	0–1	Blackpool	Fleetwood
15:00 GMT		Report	Madine 16'	Stadium: Highbury Stadium; Attendance: 0 Referee: J. Busby

12 December 2020 16	Blackpool	0–0	Oxford United	Blackpool
15:00 GMT		Report	Kelly (yellow card) 32'	Stadium: Bloomfield Road; Attendance: 0 Referee: Martin Coy

15 December 2020 17	Blackpool	3–2	Hull City	Blackpool
19:00 GMT	Yates 45'; Anderson (yellow card) 65', (goal) 66'; Hamilton 90+3'	Report	Wilks 38'; Burke 89'; Smallwood (yellow card) 90+1'	Stadium: Bloomfield Road; Attendance: 0 Referee: Ben Speedie

19 December 2020 18	Accrington Stanley	0–0	Blackpool	Accrington
15:00 GMT		Report	Dougall (yellow card) 55'	Stadium: Wham Stadium; Attendance: 0 Referee: Declan Bourne

29 December 2020 19	Shrewsbury Town	1–0	Blackpool	Shrewsbury
19:45 GMT	Norburn (penalty missed) 38' (yellow card) 41'; Udoh 38'; Vela (yellow card) 48'; Tracey (yellow card) 85'	Report	Madine (yellow card) 72'	Stadium: Montgomery Waters Meadow; Attendance: 0 Referee: Neil Hair

2 January 2021 20	Bristol Rovers	2–1	Blackpool	Horfield
15:00 GMT	Hanlan 34' (penalty missed) 47'; Nicholson 36'; Ehmer (yellow card) 64'; Leahy (yellow card) 87'	Report	Madine 9'	Stadium: Memorial Stadium; Attendance: 0 Referee: Ollie Yates

16 January 2021 21	Hull City	1–1	Blackpool	Kingston upon Hull
15:00 GMT	Wilks 51'; Burke (yellow card) 66' (yellow-red card) 77'; Greaves (yellow card) 90+4'	Report	Dougall (yellow card) 27'; Yates 81'; Madine (yellow card) 90+4'	Stadium: KCOM Stadium; Attendance: 0 Referee: Sam Barrott

26 January 2021 22	Wigan Athletic	0–5	Blackpool	Wigan
19:00 GMT	Darikwa (yellow card) 54'	Report	Ekpiteta 40'; Yates 42'; Virtue 53'; Simms 87', 90+1'	Stadium: DW Stadium; Attendance: 0 Referee: Darren Drysdale

2 February 2021 23	Blackpool	2–0	Northampton Town	Blackpool
19:00 GMT	Ekpiteta 12'; Yates 90+2'	Report	Chukwuemeka (yellow card) 68'; McWilliams (yellow card) 78'; Morris (yellow card) 89'; Mills (yellow card) 90+5'	Stadium: Bloomfield Road; Attendance: 0 Referee: James Oldham

6 February 2021 24	Ipswich Town	2–0	Blackpool	Ipswich
15:00 GMT	Kenlock (yellow card) 22'; Judge 43'; Woolfenden 49'; Matheson (yellow card) 67'	Report	Maxwell (yellow card) 57'; Kaikai (yellow card) 64'	Stadium: Portman Road; Attendance: 0 Referee: John Busby

16 February 2021 25	Blackpool	1–0	Rochdale	Blackpool
19:00 GMT	Kaikai 21'	Report		Stadium: Bloomfield Road; Attendance: 0 Referee: Anthony Backhouse

20 February 2021 26	Portsmouth	0–1	Blackpool	Portsmouth
15:00 GMT	Cannon (yellow card) 71'; Curtis (yellow card) 90+3'	Report	Garbutt (yellow card) 19'; Simms (yellow card) 33'; Yates 82'; Gabriel (yellow card) 89'	Stadium: Fratton Park; Attendance: 0 Referee: Sam Allison

27 February 2021 27	Charlton Athletic	0–3	Blackpool	Charlton
15:00 GMT	Oshilaja (yellow card) 29'; Pratley (yellow card) 42' (yellow-red card) 48'; Shinnie (yellow card) 55'; Famewo (yellow card) 79'; Aneke (red card) 85'	Report	Yates 10' (pen.), 52' (pen.), (yellow card) 63'; Virtue-Thick 37'	Stadium: The Valley; Attendance: 0 Referee: Brett Huxtable

2 March 2021 28	Blackpool	1–1	Crewe Alexandra	Blackpool
19:00 GMT	Ballard 41'; Lawrence-Gabriel (yellow card) 78'; Virtue (yellow card) 90+3'; Garbutt (yellow card) 90+3'	Report	Walker 86'	Stadium: Bloomfield Road; Attendance: 0 Referee: Seb Stockbridge

6 March 2021 29	Blackpool	1–1	AFC Wimbledon	Blackpool
15:00 GMT	Yates (yellow card) 17'; Simms 59'	Report	O'Neill (yellow card) 24'; Palmer 90+3'	Stadium: Bloomfield Road; Attendance: 0 Referee: Thomas Bramall

9 March 2021 30	Milton Keynes Dons	0–1	Blackpool	Denbigh
19:00 GMT	O'Hora (yellow card) 90+5'	Report	Yates 33'	Stadium: Stadium:mk; Attendance: 0 Referee: Lee Swabey

13 March 2021 31	Blackpool	0–0	Fleetwood Town	Blackpool
15:00 GMT	Kaikai (yellow card) 19'; Dougall (yellow card) 36'	Report	Batty (yellow card) 26'; Burns (yellow card) 55'; Andrew (yellow card) 76'; Connolly (yellow card) 90+1'	Stadium: Bloomfield Road; Attendance: 0 Referee: Will Finnie

16 March 2021 32	Blackpool	1–1	Burton Albion	Blackpool
19:00 GMT	Garbutt 64'	Report	Carter 24', (yellow card) 71'	Stadium: Bloomfield Road; Attendance: 0 Referee: Chris Sarginson

20 March 2021 33	Oxford United	0–2	Blackpool	Oxford
15:00 GMT	Brannagan (yellow card) 88'	Report	Dougall 16'; Ballard 42'; Garbutt (yellow card) 79'; Yates (yellow card) 90'	Stadium: The Kassam Stadium; Attendance: 0 Referee: Peter Wright

23 March 2021 34	Blackpool	3–1	Peterborough United	Blackpool
19:00 GMT	Yates 1', 52' (pen.); Ward (yellow card) 48'; Garbutt 58'	Report	Brown (yellow card) 16'; Kent (yellow card) 20'; Ward 45+2'; Hamilton (yellow card) 51'; Thompson (yellow card) 80'	Stadium: Bloomfield Road; Attendance: 0 Referee: Bobby Madley

27 March 2021 35	Blackpool	2–2	Plymouth Argyle	Blackpool
15:00 GMT	Kaikai 47'; Yates 64' (pen.)	Report	Hardie 12'; Edwards 90+1'	Stadium: Bloomfield Road; Attendance: 0 Referee: Carl Brook

2 April 2021 36	Swindon Town	0–2	Blackpool	Swindon
15:00 BST		Report	Dougall (yellow card) 18'; Simms 44'; Yates 61'	Stadium: The County Ground; Attendance: 0 Referee: Carl Boyeson

5 April 2021 37	Blackpool	4–1	Gillingham	Blackpool
15:00 BST	Yates 5', 20'; Kaikai 30'; Embleton (yellow card) 39', (goal) 61'	Report	Graham 14'; O'Keefe (yellow card) 34'	Stadium: Bloomfield Road; Attendance: 0 Referee: Darren Drysdale

10 April 2021 38	Lincoln City	2–2	Blackpool	Lincoln
15:00 BST	Morton (yellow card) 2'; McGrandles (yellow card) 49'; Scully 75'; Johnson 84', (yellow card) 90+4'; Jones (yellow card) 90+1'	Report	Simms 37'; Kaikai 48'	Stadium: LNER Stadium; Attendance: 0 Referee: Marc Edwards

13 April 2021 39	Blackpool	0–0	Accrington Stanley	Blackpool
19:00 BST	Ballard (yellow card) 90+4'	Report	Morgan (yellow card) 24'; Rodgers (yellow card) 75'; Burgess (yellow card) 85'; Bishop (penalty missed) 88'	Stadium: Bloomfield Road; Attendance: 0 Referee: Sam Barrott

17 April 2021 40	Blackpool	1–0	Sunderland	Blackpool
12:30 BST	Dougall (yellow card) 27'; Garbutt 58'	Report	McFadzean (yellow card) 18'; Leadbitter (yellow card) 37'	Stadium: Bloomfield Road; Attendance: 0 Referee: Tom Nield

20 April 2021 41	Rochdale	1–0	Blackpool	Rochdale
19:00 BST	Rathbone 69', (yellow card) 90'; Lund (yellow card) 70'; Lynch (yellow card) 90+4'	Report	Ward (yellow card) 66'	Stadium: Spotland; Attendance: 0 Referee: Craig Hicks

24 April 2021 42	Blackpool	0–1	Shrewsbury Town	Blackpool
15:00 BST		Report	Norburn (yellow card) 30'; Pennington 53'; Main (yellow card) 66'	Stadium: Bloomfield Road; Attendance: 0 Referee: James Bell

27 April 2021 43	Sunderland	0–1	Blackpool	Sunderland
19:00 BST	McGeady (yellow card) 64'	Report	Kaikai 56'; Ballard (yellow card) 87'	Stadium: Stadium of Light; Attendance: 0 Referee: Will Finnie

1 May 2021 44	Northampton Town	0–3	Blackpool	Northampton
15:00 BST	Kioso (yellow card) 45+6'; Edmondson (yellow card) 67'	Report	Garbutt 19'; Husband (yellow card) 54'; Yates 75', 86'	Stadium: PTS Academy Stadium; Attendance: 0 Referee: Peter Wright

4 May 2021 45	Blackpool	2–0	Doncaster Rovers	Blackpool
19:00 BST	Simms 22', 80'; Lawrence-Gabriel (yellow card) 42'; Stewart (yellow card) 55'; Husband (yellow card) 58'	Report	Wright (yellow card) 40'	Stadium: Bloomfield Road; Attendance: 0 Referee: Robert Lewis

9 May 2021 46	Blackpool	1–0	Bristol Rovers	Blackpool
12:00 BST	Holmes (yellow card) 18'; Simms 75'	Report	Harries (yellow card) 13'; Hargreaves (yellow card) 25'; Baldwin (yellow card) 31'; Tutonda (yellow card) 55'	Stadium: Bloomfield Road; Attendance: 0 Referee: Charles Breakspear

====== Play-offs ======
18 May 2021 Semi-final, first leg	Oxford United	0–3	Blackpool	Oxford
18:00 BST		Report	Husband (yellow card) 3'; Turton 23'; Simms 26', 74'; Anderson (yellow card) 45'; Stewart (yellow card) 59'	Stadium: The Kassam Stadium; Attendance: 3,204; Referee: Bobby Madley

21 May 2021 Semi-final, second leg	Blackpool	3–3 (6–3 agg.)	Oxford United	Blackpool
19:45 BST	Embleton 11'; Dougall 13'; Maxwell (yellow card) 40'; Yates 54'; Stewart (yellow card) 65'; Turton (yellow card) 90+2'	Report	Taylor 7', (yellow card) 55'; Brannagan (yellow card) 12'; Atkinson 52'; Shodipo 74'; Sykes (yellow card) 90+5'	Stadium: Bloomfield Road; Attendance: 4,000; Referee: Keith Stroud

30 May 2021 Final	Blackpool	2–1	Lincoln City	London
15:00 BST	Dougall 34', 54', (yellow card) 92'; Garbutt (yellow card) 8'; Ballard (yellow card) 48'; Husband (yellow card) 84'	Report	Turton 1' (o.g.); Bridcutt (yellow card) 66'	Stadium: Wembley Stadium; Attendance: 9,751; Referee: Tony Harrington

==== FA Cup ====
The draw for the first round was made on 26 October. The second-round draw was revealed on 9 November by Danny Cowley. The third-round draw was made on 30 November, with Premier League and EFL Championship clubs all entering the competition. The draw for the fourth and fifth round were made on 11 January, conducted by Peter Crouch.

Win Draw Loss

8 November 2020 First round	Eastbourne Borough	0–3	Blackpool	Langney
14:30 GMT	Whelpdale (yellow card) 52'; Luer (yellow card) 87'	Report	Madine 58', 68'; Kemp (yellow card) 89'; Yates 90+2'	Stadium: Priory Lane; Attendance: 0 Referee: David Rock

28 November 2020 Second round	Harrogate Town	0–4	Blackpool	Harrogate
15:00 GMT	Miller (yellow card) 45+2'; Falkingham (yellow card) 47'; Burrell (yellow card) 52'; Lokko (red card) 90'; Kerry (yellow card) 90+4'	Report	Beck 50' (o.g.); Ward 60'; Lawrence-Gabriel 85'; Kemp 90+2'	Stadium: The EnviroVent Stadium; Attendance: 0 Referee: James Oldham

9 January 2021 Third round	Blackpool	2–2 (a.e.t.) (3–2 p)	West Bromwich Albion	Blackpool
15:00 GMT	Ballard (yellow card) 38'; Yates 41'; Madine 66'	Report	Ajayi (yellow card) 16', (goal) 52'; Gallagher (yellow card) 47'; Pereira 80' (pen.)	Stadium: Bloomfield Road; Attendance: 0 Referee: John Brooks
	Penalties
	Yates (penalty missed); Dougall (penalty scored); Husband (penalty scored); Madine (penalty scored); Kaikai (penalty missed)		Grosicki (penalty scored); Edwards (penalty missed); Furlong (penalty missed); Livermore (penalty scored); Pereira (penalty missed)

23 January 2021 Fourth round	Brighton & Hove Albion	2–1	Blackpool	Falmer
15:00 GMT	Bissouma 27'; Alzate 58'	Report	Madine 45+1'	Stadium: Amex Stadium; Attendance: 0 Referee: Darren England

==== EFL Cup ====
The first-round draw was made on 18 August.

29 August 2020 1	Stoke City	0–0 (5–4 p)	Blackpool	Stoke-on-Trent
15:00 BST		Report		Stadium: Britannia Stadium; Attendance: 0 Referee: James Adcock
	Penalties
	McClean (penalty missed); Campbell (penalty scored); Clucas (penalty scored); Thompson (penalty missed); Fletcher (penalty scored); Martins Indi (penalty scored); Oakley-Boothe (penalty scored)		(penalty missed) Sarkic; (penalty scored) Hamilton; (penalty missed) Anderson; (penalty scored) Robson; (penalty scored) Kaikai; (penalty scored) Husband; (penalty missed) Turton

Win Draw Loss

==== EFL Trophy ====
Win Draw Loss

On 17 August 2020, the regional groups for the 2020–21 EFL Trophy were made. Blackpool were drawn in Northern Group G, alongside Accrington Stanley and Barrow and Leeds United U-21s. The second round draw was made by Matt Murray on 20 November, at St Andrew's.

Pos	Div	Team	Pld	W	PW	PL	L	GF	GA	GD	Pts	Qualification
1	L1	Accrington Stanley	3	2	1	0	0	9	1	+8	8	Advance to Round 2
2	L1	Blackpool	3	1	1	1	0	4	1	+3	6	Advance to Round 2
3	L2	Barrow	3	0	1	1	1	2	3	−1	3	
4	ACA	Leeds United U21	3	0	0	1	2	2	12	−10	1	

Source: EFL.com

8 September 2020 Group stage	Blackpool	0–0 (5–3 p)	Barrow	Blackpool
19:00 BST	Robson (yellow card) 48'	Report		Stadium: Bloomfield Road; Attendance: 0 Referee: Martin Coy
	Penalties
	Yates (penalty scored); Lubala (penalty scored); Anderson (penalty scored); Ward (penalty scored); Kemp (penalty scored)		Quigley (penalty scored); Brown (penalty missed); Gribbin (penalty scored); Taylor (penalty scored)

6 October 2020 Group stage	Accrington Stanley	1–1 (4–3 p)	Blackpool	Accrington
19:00 BST	Bishop 79'	Report	Anderson 10'	Stadium: Wham Stadium; Attendance: 0 Referee: Ben Speedie
	Penalties
	Bishop (penalty missed); Charles (penalty scored); Sykes (penalty scored); Pritchard (penalty scored); Scully (penalty scored)		Yates (penalty scored); Robson (penalty scored); Anderson (penalty scored); Ward (penalty missed); Kemp (penalty missed)

11 November 2020 Group stage	Blackpool	3–0	Leeds United U21	Blackpool
19:00 GMT	Kemp 9'; Lawrence-Gabriel (yellow card) 18'; Drameh 20' (o.g.); Antwi (yellow card) 44' (yellow-red card) 78'; Robson 82'	Report		Stadium: Bloomfield Road; Attendance: 0 Referee: Seb Stockbridge

8 December 2020 Second round	Fleetwood Town	0–0 (5–4 p)	Blackpool	Fleetwood
19:45 GMT		Report		Stadium: Highbury Stadium; Attendance: 0
	Penalties
	Duffy (penalty scored); McKay (penalty scored); Evans (penalty scored); Madden (penalty scored); Coutts (penalty scored)		Lawrence-Gabriel (penalty scored); Lubala (penalty scored); Robson (penalty missed); Sarkic (penalty scored); Garbutt (penalty scored)

== Squad statistics ==
No.	Pos.	Name	League		FA Cup		League Cup		League Trophy		Play-offs		Total		Discipline	
No.	Pos.	Name	Apps	Goals	Apps	Goals	Apps	Goals	Apps	Goals	Apps	Goals	Apps	Goals	Yellow card	Red card
8	FW	(England) Keshi Anderson	17	2	1	0	1	0	4	1	3	0	26	3	2	0
25	MF	(England) Cameron Antwi	0	0	0	0	0	0	1	0	0	0	1	0	2	1
36	MF	(Scotland) Robert Apter	1	0	0	0	0	0	1	0	0	0	2	0	0	0
26	DF	(Northern Ireland) Daniel Ballard (on loan from Arsenal)	25	2	2	0	0	0	0	0	3	0	30	2	5	1
—	MF	(England) Jamie Devitt (joined Barrow on 19 January)	0	0	0	0	0	0	0	0	0	0	0	0	0	0
12	MF	(Australia) Kenny Dougall	34	1	3	0	0	0	0	0	3	3	40	4	7	0
21	DF	(England) Marvin Ekpiteta	28	2	4	0	1	0	0	0	1	0	34	2	4	0
32	MF	(England) Elliot Embleton (on loan from Sunderland)	18	1	0	0	0	0	0	0	3	1	21	2	1	0
11	MF	(England) Liam Feeney	0	0	0	0	0	0	0	0	0	0	0	0	0	0
33	GK	(Slovakia) Alex Fojtíček	0	0	0	0	0	0	0	0	0	0	0	0	0	0
2	DF	(England) Jordan Gabriel (on loan from Nottingham Forest)	27	0	3	1	0	0	3	0	2	0	35	1	5	0
29	DF	(England) Luke Garbutt	31	4	2	0	0	0	2	0	3	0	38	4	4	0
16	MF	(England) Ben Garrity	0	0	0	0	0	0	0	0	0	0	0	0	0	0
23	DF	(Iceland) Daníel Leó Grétarsson	12	0	2	0	0	0	1	0	0	0	15	0	1	0
22	MF	(England) CJ Hamilton	22	5	2	0	1	0	0	0	1	0	26	5	0	0
—	FW	(Scotland) Ryan Hardie (joined Plymouth Argyle on 29 January)	0	0	0	0	0	0	0	0	0	0	0	0	0	0
27	DF	(England) Teddy Howe	0	0	0	0	0	0	2	0	0	0	2	0	0	0
3	DF	(England) James Husband	27	0	3	0	1	0	2	0	3	0	36	0	5	2
10	MF	(England) Sullay Kaikai	36	7	3	0	1	0	0	0	0	0	40	7	5	0
19	MF	(England) Dan Kemp (on loan from West Ham)	8	0	3	1	0	0	4	1	0	0	15	2	1	0
30	FW	(Democratic Republic of the Congo) Bez Lubala	12	0	4	0	0	0	4	0	0	0	20	0	1	0
—	MF	(Scotland) Calum Macdonald (joined Tranmere Rovers on 1 February)	0	0	0	0	0	0	0	0	0	0	0	0	0	0
14	FW	(England) Gary Madine	21	4	4	4	0	0	1	0	3	0	29	8	4	0
1	GK	(Wales) Chris Maxwell	43	0	4	0	1	0	2	0	3	0	53	0	3	0
15	DF	(England) Demetri Mitchell	32	1	2	0	0	0	2	0	3	0	39	1	0	0
12	DF	(Saint Kitts and Nevis) Michael Nottingham (joined Accrington Stanley on 9 October)	3	0	0	0	1	0	1	0	0	0	5	0	1	0
24	FW	(England) Joe Nuttall	0	0	0	0	0	0	0	0	0	0	0	0	0	0
6	MF	(England) Ethan Robson	28	0	2	0	1	0	4	1	1	0	36	1	3	1
7	MF	(Montenegro) Oliver Sarkic	5	0	1	0	1	0	2	0	0	0	9	0	0	0
34	MF	(England) Nathan Shaw	1	0	0	0	0	0	1	0	0	0	2	0	0	0
13	GK	(England) Jack Sims	0	0	0	0	0	0	2	0	0	0	2	0	0	0
19	FW	(England) Ellis Simms	21	8	1	0	0	0	0	0	2	2	23	10	1	0
39	MF	(England) Kevin Stewart	13	0	0	0	0	0	0	0	3	0	16	0	3	0
4	DF	(England) Jordan Thorniley	19	0	1	0	1	0	4	0	2	0	27	0	0	0
20	DF	(England) Ollie Turton	37	0	2	0	1	0	2	0	3	1	45	1	5	0
17	MF	(England) Matty Virtue	16	2	2	0	1	0	1	0	0	0	20	2	1	0
28	GK	(England) Sam Walker (on loan from Reading)	2	0	0	0	0	0	0	0	0	0	2	0	0	0
18	MF	(England) Grant Ward	36	1	3	1	1	0	3	0	1	0	44	2	3	0
5	MF	(Wales) MJ Williams (joined Bolton Wanderers on 1 February)	10	0	1	0	0	0	3	0	0	0	14	0	0	0
31	FW	(Wales) Ben Woodburn (on loan from Liverpool)	10	0	1	0	0	0	0	0	0	0	11	0	0	0
9	FW	(England) Jerry Yates	44	20	3	2	1	0	3	0	3	1	54	23	4	0
—	FW	(Tanzania) Adi Yussuf	0	0	0	0	0	0	0	0	0	0	0	0	0	0
Discipline totals															71	5

- Players used: 34
- Goals scored: 82 (including 2 own-goals)

Statistics accurate as of 2 June 2021

== Transfers ==
=== Transfers in ===
Date	Pos.	Nat.	Name	From	Fee	Ref.
1 July 2020	LW	(England)	Keshi Anderson	Free agency	—	
8 July 2020	CB	(England)	Marvin Ekpiteta	Free agency	—	
9 July 2020	CM	(Montenegro)	Oliver Sarkic	Free agency	—	
21 July 2020	CF	(England)	Jerry Yates	Rotherham United	Undisclosed	
21 July 2020	LW	(England)	CJ Hamilton	Mansfield Town	Undisclosed	
6 August 2020	CM	(England)	Ethan Robson	Free agency	—	
24 August 2020	DM	(Wales)	Jordan Williams	Free agency	—	
25 August 2020	GK	(Slovakia)	Alex Fojtíček	Free agency	—	
1 September 2020	LW	(Democratic Republic of the Congo)	Bez Lubala	Crawley Town	Undisclosed	
4 September 2020	LB	(England)	Demetri Mitchell	Free agency	—	
22 September 2020	LB	(England)	Luke Garbutt	Free agency	—	
5 October 2020	CB	(Iceland)	Daníel Leó Grétarsson	Aalesunds	Undisclosed	
16 October 2020	DM	(Australia)	Kenny Dougall	Free agency	—	
23 January 2021	CM	(England)	Kevin Stewart	Free agency	—	
26 February 2021	GK	(England)	Stuart Moore	Free agency	—	

=== Loans in ===
Date	Pos.	Nat.	Name	From	Until	Ref.
3 September 2020	RW	(England)	Dan Kemp	West Ham United	End of season (recalled on 15 January)	
1 October 2020	RB	(England)	Jordan Lawrence-Gabriel	Nottingham Forest	End of season	
5 October 2020	CB	(Northern Ireland)	Daniel Ballard	Arsenal	End of season	
16 October 2020	CF	(Wales)	Ben Woodburn	Liverpool	17 January 2021	
23 December 2020	GK	(England)	Sam Walker	Reading	6 January 2021	
20 January 2021	CF	(England)	Ellis Simms	Everton	End of season	
1 February 2021	CM	(England)	Elliot Embleton	Sunderland	End of season	

=== Transfers out ===
Date	Pos.	Nat.	Name	To	Fee	Ref.
1 July 2020	GK	(England)	Myles Boney	Free agency	—	
1 July 2020	LW	(The Gambia)	Yusifu Ceesay	Free agency	—	
1 July 2020	CF	(Ivory Coast)	Armand Gnanduillet	Free agency	—	
1 July 2020	LB	(Northern Ireland)	Sean Graham	Free agency	—	
1 July 2020	GK	(England)	Mark Howard	Free agency	—	
1 July 2020	GK	(Republic of the Congo)	Christoffer Mafoumbi	Free agency	—	
1 July 2020	RW	(Republic of Ireland)	Sean Scannell	Free agency	—	
1 July 2020	CF	(England)	Owen Watkinson	Free agency	—	
1 July 2020	CM	(England)	Jay Spearing	Free agency	—	
31 July 2020	CF	(England)	Tony Weston	Rangers	Undisclosed	
3 August 2020	CB	(England)	Ryan Edwards	Dundee United	Undisclosed	
6 August 2020	CF	(England)	Nathan Delfouneso	Bolton Wanderers	Undisclosed	
9 October 2020	CB	(Saint Kitts and Nevis)	Michael Nottingham	Accrington Stanley	Undisclosed	
19 January 2021	MF	(Republic of Ireland)	Jamie Devitt	Free agency	—	
29 January 2021	CF	(Scotland)	Ryan Hardie	Plymouth Argyle	Undisclosed	
1 February 2021	MF	(Wales)	MJ Williams	Bolton Wanderers	—	
1 February 2021	DF	(Scotland)	Calum Macdonald	Tranmere Rovers	Undisclosed	

=== Loans out ===
Date	Pos.	Nat.	Name	To	Until	Ref.
29 July 2020	CF	(Scotland)	Ryan Hardie	Plymouth Argyle	30 June 2021 (made permanent on 29 January)	
19 August 2020	LB	(Scotland)	Calum Macdonald	Tranmere Rovers	30 June 2021 (made permanent on 1 February)	
28 August 2020	CF	(Tanzania)	Adi Yussuf	Wrexham	30 June 2021 (ended on 1 February 2021)	
31 August 2020	CF	(England)	Joe Nuttall	Northampton Town	30 June 2021	
2 September 2020	CM	(England)	Ben Garrity	Oldham Athletic	30 June 2021	
17 September 2020	RM	(England)	Liam Feeney	Tranmere Rovers	30 June 2021	
2 October 2020	LM	(England)	Nathan Shaw	AFC Fylde	June 2021	
16 October 2020	CM	(Republic of Ireland)	Jamie Devitt	Newport County	18 January 2021	
1 December 2020	DM	(England)	Cameron Antwi	Southport	17 January 2021	
1 February 2021	RB	(England)	Teddy Howe	Scunthorpe United	30 June 2021	
1 February 2021	CF	(Montenegro)	Oliver Sarkic	Mansfield Town	30 June 2021	
2 February 2021	CF	(Tanzania)	Adi Yussuf	Chesterfield	30 June 2021	
8 March 2021	LM	(England)	Nathan Shaw	Stockport County	7 April 2021	
