= Jordan Gabriel =

Jordan Gabriel is the name of:

- Jordan Gabriel (footballer)
- Jordan Gabriel (musician)
