= Ethan Robson =

English footballer (born 1996)

Personal information
- Full name: Ethan Robson
- Date of birth: 25 October 1996 (age 30)
- Place of birth: Houghton-le-Spring, England
- Height: 5 ft 10 in (1.78 m)
- Position: Midfielder

Youth career
- 2004–2014: Sunderland

Senior career*
Years	Team	Apps	(Gls)
2014–2020	Sunderland	9	(0)
2019	→ Dundee (loan)	13	(2)
2019–2020	→ Grimsby Town (loan)	16	(3)
2020–2022	Blackpool	30	(0)
2021–2022	→ Milton Keynes Dons (loan)	18	(1)
2022–2024	Milton Keynes Dons	51	(1)
2024–2026	Carlisle United	10	(1)
2025	→ Gateshead (loan)	3	(1)
2025–2026	→ Spennymoor Town (loan)	11	(1)
2026	→ South Shields (loan)	12	(0)
- * Club domestic league appearances and goals as of 16:03, 7 June 2026 (UTC)

Ethan Robson (born 25 October 1996) is an English professional footballer who plays as a midfielder.

He began his career with Sunderland, and spent time on loan with Dundee and Grimsby Town, before joining Blackpool in 2020. After a stint on loan, Robson joined Milton Keynes Dons permanently for two years before signing for Carlisle United in 2024. While signed to Carlisle, Robson had loan spells with Gateshead, Spennymoor Town and South Shields.

== Early years ==
Robson was born in Houghton-le-Spring, Tyne and Wear, and attended St Robert of Newminster Catholic School in nearby Washington.

== Club career ==
=== Sunderland ===
Robson started his career with the youth team at local side Sunderland, joining the club at the age of eight and rose through the ranks to go to a full-time professional with the first team in the summer of 2014.

He featured regularly and captained the development squad and under-23 side before signing a two-year contract extension in April 2016. Robson was named the Premier League 2 Player of the Month for August 2016.

He played three games for the under-21 side in the 2016–17 EFL Trophy, and also appeared as an unused substitute on several occasions for the first team. Robson made his first-team debut in September 2017, when he replaced James Vaughan as a late substitute in the 3–0 defeat to Everton in the EFL Cup. A few days later he made his league debut in the Championship in a home defeat to Cardiff City.

Robson was loaned to Dundee in January 2019. He made 13 appearances in the Scottish Premiership and scored twice. On 2 September 2019, Robson headed out on loan again, this time joining League Two side Grimsby Town, where he played regularly until returning to Sunderland in January 2020.

Robson was released by Sunderland when his contract expired at the end of the 2019–20 season, bringing to an end a 16-year spell with the club during which he made just nine league appearances.

=== Blackpool ===
On 6 August 2020, Robson joined League One club Blackpool on a two-year deal with an option of a third. On 11 November 2020, he scored his first goal for the club in a 3–0 EFL Trophy win over Leeds United U21s.

Robson joined League One club Milton Keynes Dons on a season-long loan on 1 July 2021. He made his league debut for the club on 7 August 2021 in a 3–3 draw away to Bolton Wanderers on 7 August 2021. Robson scored his first MK Dons goal in a 1–0 home league win over Portsmouth on 11 September 2021. On 17 January 2022, Robson was recalled early from his loan by Blackpool due to injuries within the squad, amid rumours MK Dons had made two failed bids to sign him permanently. Robson was released from his Blackpool contract in May 2022, at the end of the 2021–2022 season.

=== Milton Keynes Dons ===
On 15 June 2022, Robson's former loan club Milton Keynes Dons announced he would be returning to the club on a permanent basis effective 1 July 2022 following his release from Blackpool. On 17 May 2024, the club said he would be released in the summer when his contract expired.

=== Carlisle United ===
On 25 June 2024, EFL League Two club Carlisle United announced they had signed Robson on a two-year deal. Robson would miss the start of the season with a hamstring injury which was reported to keep him out of action for roughly 3 months.

==== Gateshead (loan) ====
On 27 March 2025, Robson joined National League side Gateshead on loan for the remainder of the season. On 29 March, Robson made his debut for the Tynesiders, starting in a league game away to Barnet. The following week, Robson scored his first goal for Gateshead in a home win over Dagenham & Redbridge.

==== South Shields (loan) ====
On 23 January 2026, Robson joined National League North club South Shields on loan for the remainder of the season. On 9 May 2026, Carlisle announced that Robson would leave in the summer.

== Career statistics ==
As of 9 May 2026

Appearances and goals by club, season and competition
Club	Season	League			National Cup		League Cup		Other		Total	
Club	Season	Division	Apps	Goals	Apps	Goals	Apps	Goals	Apps	Goals	Apps	Goals
Sunderland	2014–15	Premier League	0	0	0	0	0	0	—		0	0
Sunderland	2015–16	Premier League	0	0	0	0	0	0	—		0	0
Sunderland	2016–17	Premier League	0	0	0	0	0	0	—		0	0
Sunderland	2017–18	Championship	9	0	1	0	1	0	—		11	0
Sunderland	2018–19	League One	0	0	0	0	0	0	3 (Note: Appearances in EFL Trophy)	1	3	1
Sunderland	2019–20	League One	0	0	—		0	0	—		0	0
Sunderland	Total		9	0	1	0	1	0	3	1	14	1
Sunderland U21	2016–17	—							3	0	3	0
Sunderland U21	2017–18	—							3	0	3	0
Sunderland U21	Total		—						6	0	6	0
Dundee (loan)	2018–19	Scottish Premiership	13	2	—		—		—		13	2
Grimsby Town (loan)	2019–20	League Two	16	3	2	0	1	0	2	0	21	3
Blackpool	2020–21	League One	28	0	2	0	1	0	5 (Note: Four appearances and one goal in EFL Trophy, one appearance in EFL League One play-offs)	1	36	1
Blackpool	2021–22	Championship	2	0	0	0	0	0	0	0	2	0
Blackpool	Total		30	0	2	0	1	0	5	1	38	1
Milton Keynes Dons (loan)	2021–22	League One	18	1	1	0	1	0	3	0	23	1
Milton Keynes Dons	2022–23	League One	18	1	1	0	3	0	4	0	26	1
Milton Keynes Dons	2023–24	League Two	33	0	0	0	1	0	0	0	34	0
Milton Keynes Dons	Total		51	1	1	0	4	0	4	0	60	1
Carlisle United	2024–25	League Two	7	0	1	0	0	0	0	0	8	0
Carlisle United	2025–26	National League	3	1	0	0	0	0	0	0	3	1
Carlisle United	Total		10	1	1	0	0	0	0	0	11	1
Gateshead (loan)	2024–25	National League	3	1	—		—		0	0	3	1
Spennymoor Town (loan)	2025–26	National League North	11	1	1	0	—		0	0	12	1
South Shields (loan)	2025–26	National League North	12	0	—		—		1 (Note: Appearance in National League North play-offs)	0	13	0
Career total			173	10	9	0	8	0	24	2	214	12

== Honours ==
Blackpool

- EFL League One play-offs: 2020–21

Individual

- Premier League 2 Player of the Month: August 2016
