= Kenny Dougall =

Australian professional football player

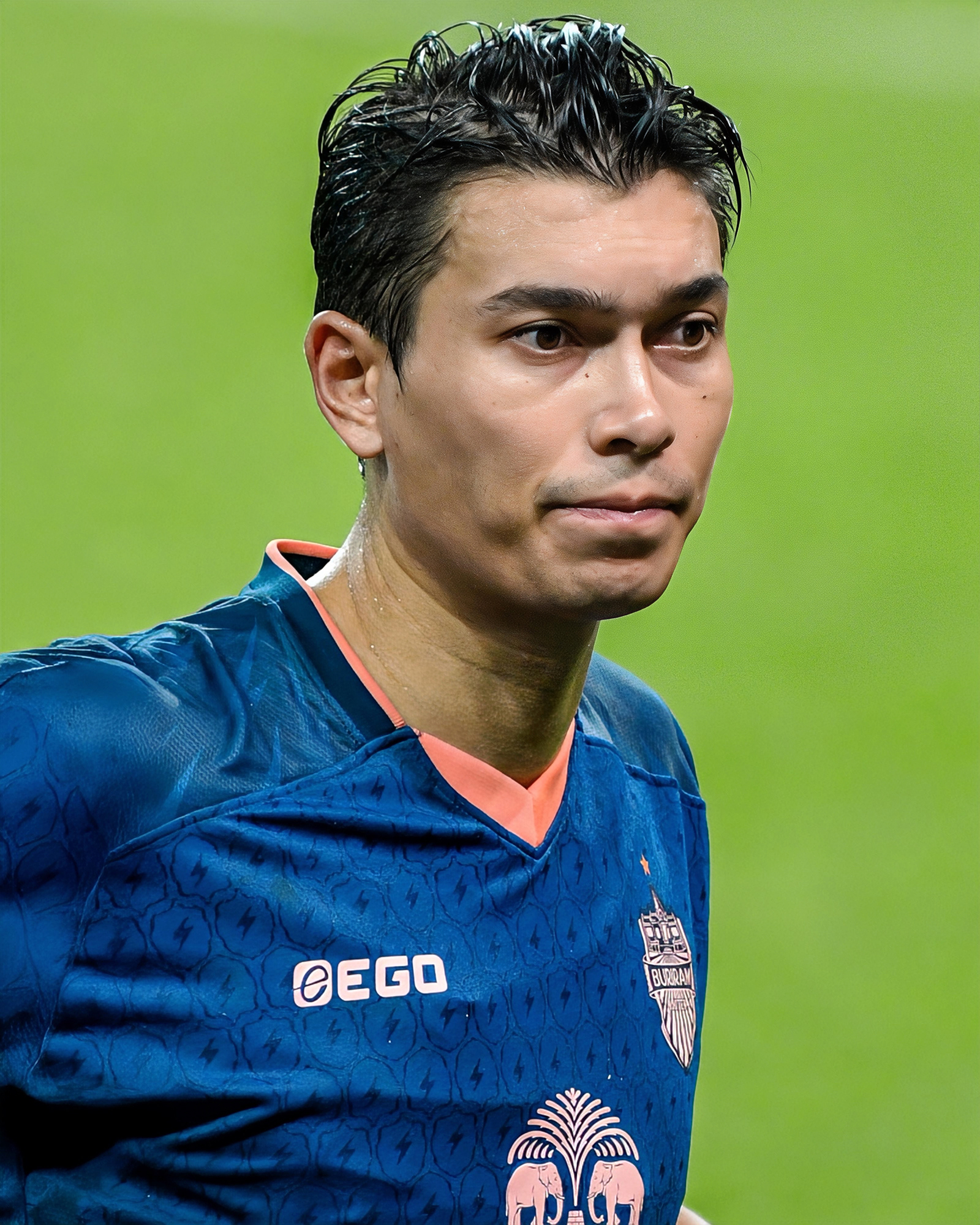
- Dougall in 2025

Personal information
- Full name: Kenneth William Dougall
- Date of birth: 7 May 1993 (age 33)
- Place of birth: Brisbane, Queensland, Australia
- Height: 1.85 m (6 ft 1 in)
- Positions: Centre-back; defensive midfielder

Team information
- Current team: Buriram United
- Number: 16

Youth career
- Samford Rangers
- 2009–2011: QAS
- 2009–2013: Brisbane Roar

Senior career*
Years	Team	Apps	(Gls)
2013–2014	Brisbane City	34	(10)
2014–2015	Telstar	29	(1)
2015–2018	Sparta Rotterdam	81	(2)
2018–2020	Barnsley	39	(0)
2020–2024	Blackpool	129	(8)
2024–	Buriram United	62	(2)

International career^{‡}
2015	Australia U23	4	(0)
2021–2022	Australia	5	(0)
- * Club domestic league appearances and goals as of 9 January 2026 ‡ National team caps and goals as of 1 June 2022

Kenneth William Dougall (born 7 May 1993) is an Australian professional soccer player who plays as a centre-back or a defensive midfielder for Buriram United and the Australia national team. He has previously played for Brisbane City, Telstar, Sparta Rotterdam, Barnsley and Blackpool.

Dougall scored both goals for Blackpool in their 2–1 win in the 2021 EFL League One play-off final, securing the club's promotion to the Championship for the first time in six years. He made his debut for the Australian national the following month.

== Club career ==
=== Early years ===
Dougall played as a junior at Samford Rangers in 2003, as well as attending the Queensland Academy of Sport as a 15-year-old. He joined the Brisbane Roar youth team in 2009, when he was 16.

In 2010, he shared the Roar's Youth Player of the Year award with goalkeeper Matt Acton. Unable to break into the Brisbane Roar team, he says because he "was not yet good enough," he dropped down to National Premier Leagues Queensland, where he started his senior career playing for Brisbane City. During his eighteen months at the club, he was awarded the league's Young Player of the Year award in 2013.

=== Telstar ===
In July 2014, Dougall signed for Telstar in the Eerste Divisie and made his debut on 3 October 2014 against Sparta Rotterdam, coming on as an 84th-minute substitute in a 4–3 win. Dougall scored his first goal for the club against Den Bosch on 12 December 2014. On 6 May 2015, it was announced that Dougall would leave Telstar after just one season at the club following a breakdown in contract discussions.

=== Sparta Rotterdam ===
On 29 May 2015, Dougall signed a two-year contract with Eerste Divisie side Sparta Rotterdam. Dougall quickly established himself at the club starting in the first fixture of the season away to RKC Waalwijk in a 1–1 draw. He then penned a contract extension after just 6 months keeping him at the club until the summer of 2019.

=== Barnsley ===
On 27 July 2018, Dougall joined newly relegated League One side Barnsley on an initial two-year deal with an option for a further year for an undisclosed fee. On 15 March 2019 Dougall suffered a broken leg in a match, initially attempting to play on.

Dougall was released by Barnsley on 25 June 2020.

=== Blackpool ===
Dougall joined Blackpool in October 2020, signing a two-year contract.

On 21 May 2021, Dougall scored his second goal of the season in a 3–3 draw with Oxford United in the second leg of their play-off semi-final. The result saw Blackpool win 6–3 on aggregate and progress to the final, where they met Lincoln City at Wembley Stadium on 30 May. In the final, Dougall scored both goals for Blackpool in their 2–1 win, securing promotion to the Championship for the first time in six years. The club's owner, Simon Sadler, named his pug "Kenny" in acknowledgment of Dougall's role in their promotion.

On 7 October 2021, Dougall signed a new two-year contract with the club.

=== Buriram United ===
On 24 January 2024, Dougall signed for Thai League 1 club Buriram United for an undisclosed fee.

== International career ==
Dougall earned four caps for the Australian U23 side in 2015.

On 25 May 2021, he was called up for the Australian national team for their remaining 2022 FIFA World Cup qualification matches in June. He made his debut on 3 June 2021 against Kuwait, a 3–0 victory, and made his first start four days later in a 5–1 victory over Chinese Taipei.

He was a substitute in Australia's goalless home draw with Saudi Arabia on 11 November 2021.

== Personal life ==
Born in Brisbane, Queensland, Dougall is of Scottish (paternal side) and Thai descent (maternal side).

Dougall is engaged to Hannah Adkins.

== Career statistics ==
=== Club ===
As of matches played 9 January 2026

Club	Season	League			National cup (Note: Includes KNVB Cup, FA Cup, Thai FA Cup)		League cup (Note: Includes EFL Cup, Thai League Cup)		Other		Total	
Club	Season	Division	Apps	Goals	Apps	Goals	Apps	Goals	Apps	Goals	Apps	Goals
Brisbane City	2013	NPL Queensland	24	4	–		–		–		24	4
Brisbane City	2014	NPL Queensland	10	6	0	0	–		–		10	6
Brisbane City	Total		34	10	0	0	–		–		34	10
Telstar	2014–15	Eerste Divisie	29	1	0	0	–		–		29	1
Telstar	Total		29	1	0	0	–		–		29	1
Sparta Rotterdam	2015–16	Eerste Divisie	32	0	2	0	–		–		34	0
Sparta Rotterdam	2016–17	Eredivisie	20	1	2	0	–		–		22	1
Sparta Rotterdam	2017–18	Eredivisie	29	1	1	0	–		3 (Note: Appearances in Eredivisie playoffs)	0	33	1
Sparta Rotterdam	Total		81	2	5	0	–		3	0	89	2
Barnsley	2018–19	League One	27	0	1	0	1	0	0	0	29	0
Barnsley	2019–20	Championship	12	0	2	0	0	0	–		14	0
Barnsley	Total		39	0	3	0	1	0	0	0	43	0
Blackpool	2020–21	League One	34	1	3	0	–		3 (Note: Appearances in EFL League One play-offs)	3	40	4
Blackpool	2021–22	Championship	40	1	1	0	1	0	–		42	1
Blackpool	2022–23	Championship	36	3	2	0	1	0	–		39	3
Blackpool	2023–24	League One	19	3	1	0	2	0	1 (Note: Appearances in EFL Trophy)	0	23	3
Blackpool	Total		129	8	7	0	4	0	4	3	144	11
Buriram United	2023–24	Thai League 1	15	1	1	0	3	0	–		19	1
Buriram United	2024–25	Thai League 1	30	0	6	1	5	0	14 (Note: Appearances in ASEAN Club Championship, AFC Champions League Elite)	0	55	1
Buriram United	2025–26	Thai League 1	17	1	1	0	0	0	7 (Note: Appearances in ASEAN Club Championship, AFC Champions League Elite)	0	25	1
Buriram United	Total		62	2	8	1	8	0	21	0	99	3
Career total			374	23	23	1	13	0	28	3	438	27

=== International ===
As of 1 June 2022

Australia
Year	Apps	Goals
2021	4	0
2022	1	0
Total	5	0

== Honours ==
Sparta Rotterdam

- Eerste Divisie: 2015–16

Barnsley

- EFL League One second-place promotion: 2018–19

Blackpool

- EFL League One play-offs: 2021

Buriram United

- Thai League 1 (3): 2023–24, 2024–25, 2025–26
- Thai FA Cup (2): 2024–25, 2025–26
- Thai League Cup: 2024–25
- ASEAN Club Championship (2): 2024–25, 2025-26

Individual

- Thai League 1 Team of the Season: 2025–26
