= James Husband (footballer) =

English footballer (born 1994)

Personal information
- Full name: James Andrew Husband
- Date of birth: 3 January 1994 (age 32)
- Place of birth: Leeds, England
- Height: 5 ft 10 in (1.78 m)
- Position: Left-back

Team information
- Current team: Doncaster Rovers
- Number: 3

Youth career
- 2010–2011: Doncaster Rovers

Senior career*
Years	Team	Apps	(Gls)
2011–2014	Doncaster Rovers	64	(4)
2014–2017	Middlesbrough	4	(0)
2015	→ Fulham (loan)	5	(0)
2015	→ Fulham (loan)	12	(0)
2016	→ Huddersfield Town (loan)	11	(0)
2017–2020	Norwich City	19	(0)
2018–2019	→ Fleetwood Town (loan)	33	(1)
2019–2020	→ Blackpool (loan)	22	(0)
2020–2026	Blackpool	187	(5)
2026–	Doncaster Rovers	1	(0)
- * Club domestic league appearances and goals as of 09:30, 2 September 2026 (UTC)

James Andrew Husband (born 3 January 1994) is an English professional footballer who plays as a left-back or a centre-back for EFL League One club Doncaster Rovers.

He has previously played for Doncaster Rovers, Middlesbrough, Fulham, Huddersfield Town, Norwich City, Fleetwood Town and Blackpool.

== Career ==
=== Doncaster Rovers ===
Husband was born in Leeds, West Yorkshire. He attended Wigton Moor Primary School and Boston Spa School. After coming through the Leeds United academy, he moved to Doncaster Rovers and signed a two-year scholarship in the summer of 2010. He signed his first professional contract in November 2011, on a 2 1/2-year deal after reported interest from Premier League clubs. He made his first-team debut on 17 April 2012 in a goalless draw with Middlesbrough, coming on as a second-half substitute for Shelton Martis. He made his first start four days later, as Doncaster beat Coventry City 2–0. Husband was named man of the match in Rovers' League Cup round two win over Hull City.

Husband's first goals for Rovers came when he was temporarily moved to play in left midfield. The first was at Crawley Town on 18 February, followed by a second, eight days later, at Shrewsbury Town. At the end of the season, Rovers were promoted to the Championship.

Husband scored his first goal of the 2013–14 season on 16 August, when his overhit cross went over the head of Blackburn Rovers's goalkeeper to complete a 2–0 victory. Doncaster were relegated back to League One at the end of the season.

=== Middlesbrough ===
On 26 July 2014 it was announced that James Husband would join Championship side Middlesbrough in a swap deal for Curtis Main. Husband scored his first goal for the U21s in a 2–1 victory over Newcastle United's U21s in December 2014.

On 25 March 2015, Husband joined Fulham on loan until the end of the season as part of a deal that saw Fernando Amorebieta move the other way, also on loan. He re-joined Fulham, again on loan, for a month the following season in a similar deal to the previous one, with Amorebieta joining Middlesbrough on loan for the duration of the 2015–16 season.

Husband joined Huddersfield Town on an emergency loan on 8 January 2016. He made his début as a substitute in the 2–2 draw against Reading in the FA Cup third-round match at the John Smith's Stadium the following day. He made his league début the following week in the 1–1 draw against Fulham. He played twelve games for the Terriers before his spell ended on 9 April 2016.

=== Norwich City ===
On 11 July 2017, Husband joined Norwich City, on a three-year deal, for an undisclosed fee. He made his debut in the opening game of the season on 5 August, a 1–1 draw against Fulham. He was a regular for Norwich in the first half of the season, playing in fifteen league games and three EFL Cup games. However, after a 0–0 draw against next-to-bottom Burton Albion in December, Husband was dropped from the side, with Jamal Lewis replacing him as Norwich's first-choice left-back. Husband made three appearances in the second half of the season. The last of these was a 1–1 draw against Sunderland, where he was replaced by Lewis at half-time with the score 0-0.

At the beginning of the 2018–19 season, with Lewis injured, Husband returned to the side for the opening game, a 2–2 draw with Birmingham City; however, he was immediately dropped again, with the normally right-sided Ivo Pinto being played at left-back for the next game until Lewis could resume his place. This was Husband's only Norwich appearance of the season.

On 20 August 2018, Husband joined League One side Fleetwood Town on loan until January.

=== Blackpool ===
On 26 July 2019, Husband joined League One side Blackpool on a season-long loan deal. He was given a straight red card in his second appearance for the Tangerines, in a 3–1 win at Southend United. The loan deal was made permanent on 25 January 2020, Husband signing an 18-month contract with an option for a further 12 months.

Neil Critchley made Husband the club captain for the 2024–25 season, replacing Oliver Norburn.

On 18 January 2025, Husband made his 200th appearance for Blackpool. On 6 May 2026, the club announced the player would be released in the summer once his contract expired.

=== Return to Doncaster Rovers ===
On 22 May 2026, Husband re-joined League One side Doncaster Rovers on a two-year deal.

== Career statistics ==
As of end of 2025–26 season

Appearances and goals by club, season and competition
Club	Season	League			FA Cup		League Cup		Other		Total	
Club	Season	Division	Apps	Goals	Apps	Goals	Apps	Goals	Apps	Goals	Apps	Goals
Doncaster Rovers	2011–12	Championship	3	0	0	0	0	0	—		3	0
Doncaster Rovers	2012–13	League One	33	3	2	0	3	0	2 (Note: Appearance(s) in Football League/EFL Trophy)	0	40	3
Doncaster Rovers	2013–14	Championship	28	1	0	0	2	0	—		28	1
Doncaster Rovers	Total		64	4	2	0	5	0	2	0	73	4
Middlesbrough	2014–15	Championship	3	0	1	0	2	0	—		6	0
Middlesbrough	2015–16	Championship	0	0	0	0	1	0	—		1	0
Middlesbrough	2016–17	Premier League	1	0	0	0	0	0	—		1	0
Middlesbrough	Total		4	0	1	0	3	0	—		8	0
Fulham (loan)	2014–15	Championship	5	0	0	0	0	0	—		5	0
Fulham (loan)	2015–16	Championship	12	0	0	0	0	0	—		12	0
Huddersfield Town (loan)	2015–16	Championship	11	0	1	0	0	0	—		12	0
Norwich City	2017–18	Championship	18	0	0	0	3	0	—		21	0
Norwich City	2018–19	Championship	1	0	0	0	0	0	—		1	0
Norwich City	2019–20	Premier League	0	0	0	0	0	0	—		0	0
Norwich City	Total		19	0	0	0	3	0	—		22	0
Fleetwood Town (loan)	2018–19	League One	33	1	2	0	0	0	0	0	35	1
Blackpool (loan)	2019–20	League One	22	0	4	0	0	0	0	0	26	0
Blackpool	2019–20	League One	6	0	0	0	0	0	0	0	6	0
Blackpool	2020–21	League One	27	0	3	0	1	0	5 (Note: Two appearances in EFL Trophy, three appearances in League One play-offs)	0	36	0
Blackpool	2021–22	Championship	31	1	1	0	1	0	—		33	1
Blackpool	2022–23	Championship	29	0	2	0	1	0	—		32	0
Blackpool	2023–24	League One	39	1	3	0	1	0	1	0	44	1
Blackpool	2024–25	League One	34	3	2	0	1	0	1	0	38	3
Blackpool	2025–26	League One	21	0	1	0	0	0	1	0	23	0
Blackpool	Total		187	5	12	0	5	0	8	0	212	5
Career total			357	10	21	0	17	0	10	0	405	10

== Honours ==
Doncaster Rovers

- Football League One: 2012–13

Blackpool

- EFL League One play-offs: 2021
