= Chris Maxwell (footballer) =

Welsh footballer

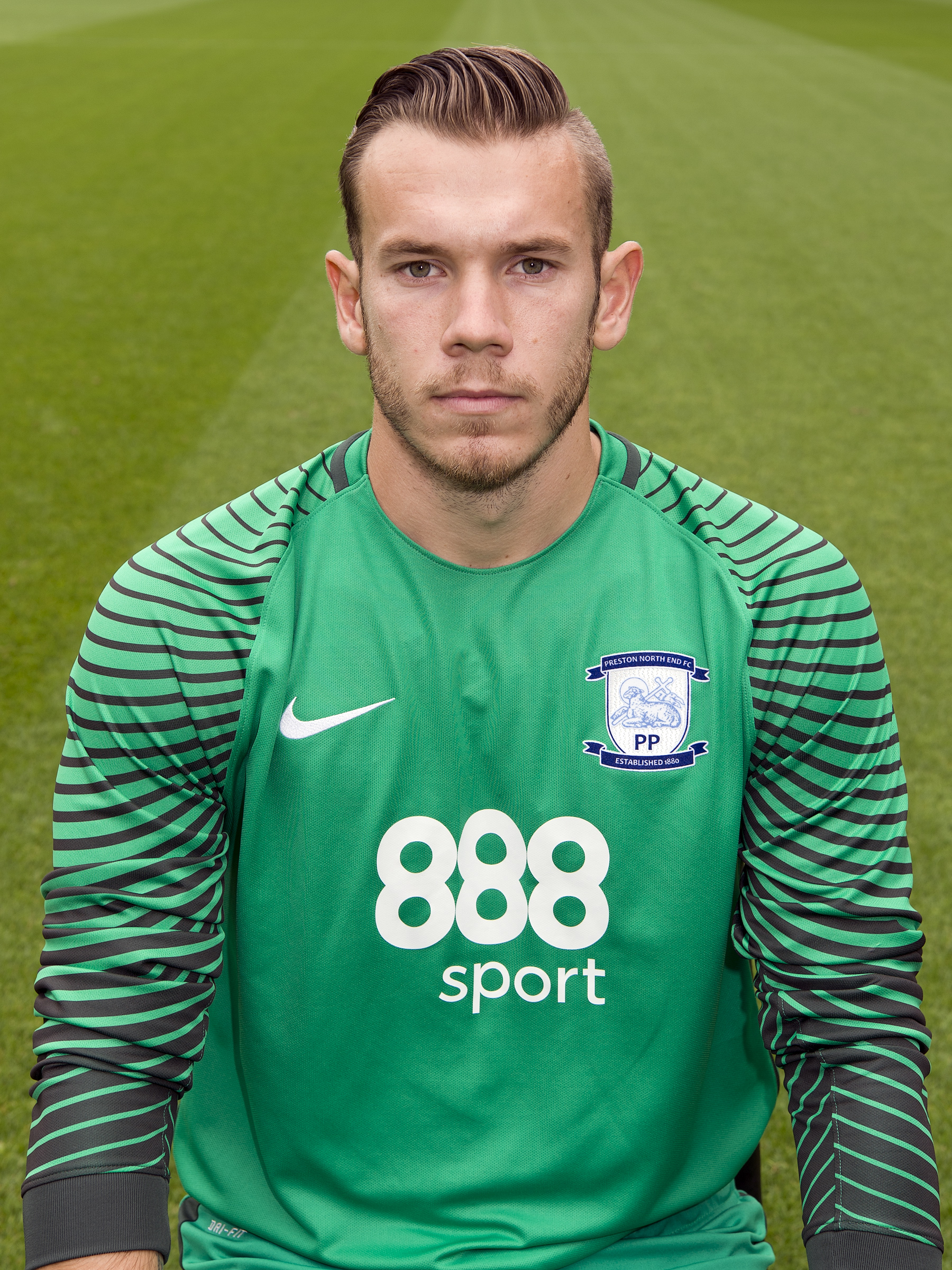
- Maxwell with Preston North End in 2016

Personal information
- Full name: Christopher Ethan Maxwell
- Date of birth: 30 July 1990 (age 36)
- Place of birth: St Asaph, Wales
- Height: 6 ft 1 in (1.85 m)
- Position: Goalkeeper

Youth career
- 1998–2000: Penrhyn Bay
- 2000–2008: Wrexham

Senior career*
Years	Team	Apps	(Gls)
2008–2012	Wrexham	76	(0)
2008–2009	→ Connah's Quay Nomads (loan)	16	(0)
2012–2016	Fleetwood Town	110	(0)
2013	→ Wrexham (loan)	17	(0)
2013–2014	→ Cambridge United (loan)	24	(0)
2016–2020	Preston North End	76	(0)
2019	→ Charlton Athletic (loan)	0	(0)
2019–2020	→ Hibernian (loan)	12	(0)
2020–2023	Blackpool	101	(0)
2023–2025	Huddersfield Town	9	(0)
Total		441	(0)

International career
2005–2007	Wales U17	6	(0)
2006–2009	Wales U19	10	(0)
2008–2011	Wales U21	16	(0)
2008–2009	Wales U23	1	(0)
- * Club domestic league appearances and goals

Christopher Ethan Maxwell (born 30 July 1990) is a Welsh former professional footballer who played as a goalkeeper.

Maxwell began his career at Wrexham where he made his professional debut at 18 years old in the 2008–09 season before moving to newly promoted League club Fleetwood Town in May 2012. He made his Fleetwood Town and simultaneously his Football League debut during the 2013–14 season after successful loan spells at Wrexham and Cambridge United. Maxwell signed for Preston North End in May 2016, and later played for Charlton Athletic and Hibernian on loan from PNE.

Maxwell played internationally for Wales at under-21 level, and all other international age groups under-19, under-17 and under-16 schoolboys teams.

== Youth football ==
Born in St Asaph, Maxwell began his career coming through Wrexham's youth system, and signed a one-year professional contract in June 2008, which was extended under the management of Dean Saunders in January 2009, keeping him at the club until May 2010.

== Club career ==
=== Connah's Quay Nomads ===
Maxwell spent a six-month loan spell at Welsh Premier League team Connah's Quay Nomads during the 2008–09 season, making 20 appearances in all competitions, before being recalled by Wrexham in January 2009.

=== Wrexham ===
In April 2009, Maxwell made his first team debut for Wrexham at the age of 18. He went on to start the remaining three league games of the 2008–09 season, claiming his first senior clean sheet on the last day of the season against Weymouth.

After playing all of their 2009–10 pre-season games, Maxwell was joined at Wrexham by the more experienced Sam Russell. After only four games of the season, Russell was sidelined with a dislocated elbow, allowing Maxwell the opportunity to start.

Maxwell went on to play 21 consecutive games and kept 10 clean sheets during Russell's absence. His contribution was acknowledged when he agreed an extension to his contract keeping him at the club until the end of the 2010–11 season. Maxwell regained the place ahead of Russell to play the last nine games of the season keeping a further five clean sheets. A number of defensive club records were broken; clean sheets, goals conceded and the first season where no more than two goals were conceded in a single game. Maxwell was recognised for his performances with a number of fans awards, including being named the Wrexham Football Association 'young player of the season'.

During the 2010–11 pre-season, Maxwell was joined at Wrexham by the more experienced Scott Shearer, and found himself once again fighting for the starting place. Maxwell took over the position in the starting line up just 10 games into the new season and soon started to attract the attention of higher league clubs. He cemented his claim to the number one position when Shearer left the club during the January transfer window.

Wrexham managed a play-off spot, but lost out to Luton Town in the semi-final play-off games. Maxwell finished the season with a number of fans awards including the Wrexham Football Association Young Player of the Season for the second year running.

Maxwell remained at Wrexham for the start of the 2011–12 season. After a frustrating season under new player manager Andy Morrell and starting only 11 times after losing the number one position to Joslain Mayebi, having been absent from the squad after being called up to the Wales under-21 side. He decided he wanted to leave the club and was subsequently released.

=== Fleetwood Town ===
Maxwell was immediately signed by newly promoted Football League newcomers, Fleetwood Town on 23 May 2012.

==== Return to Wrexham on loan ====
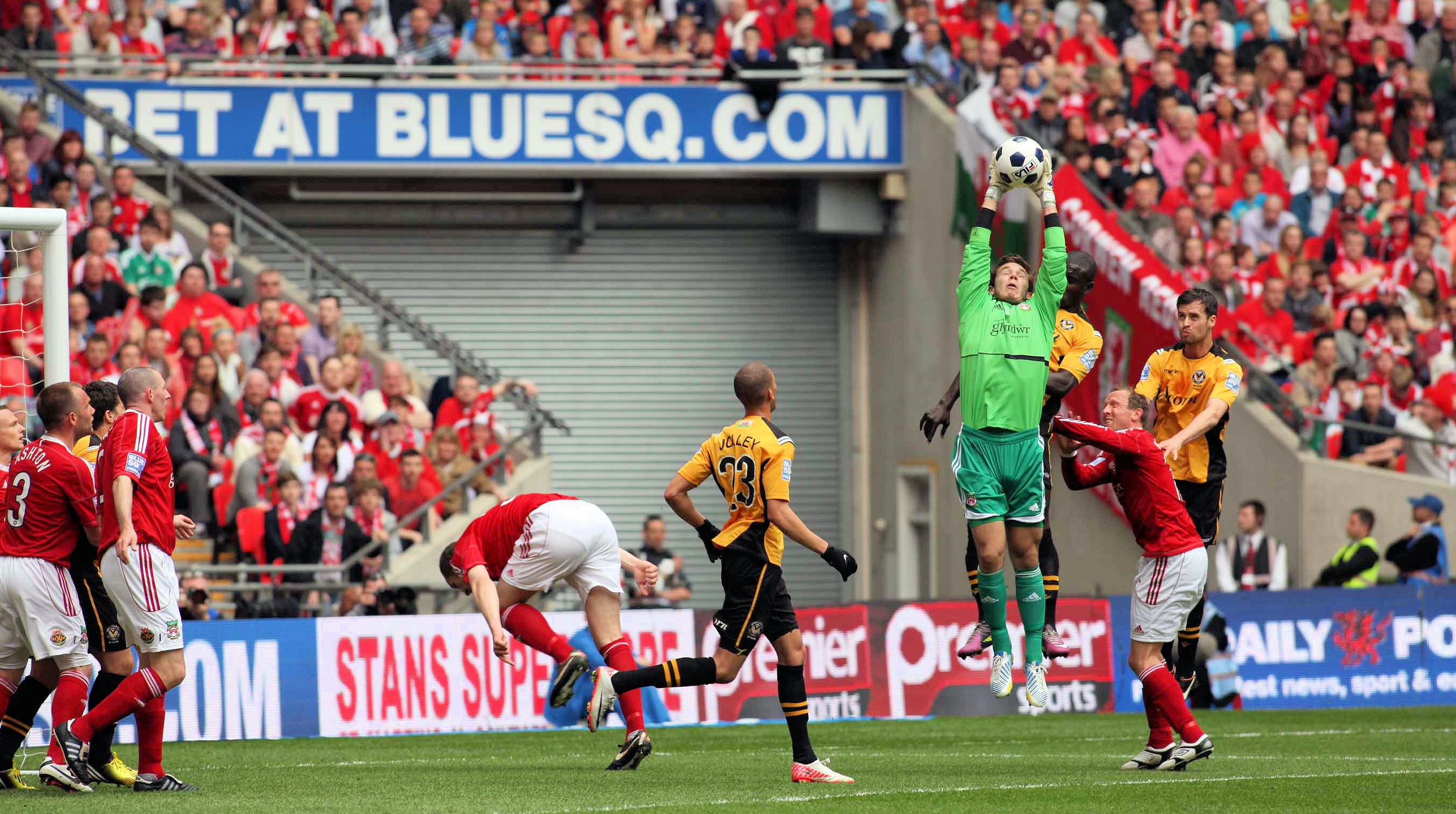
Maxwell (centre) catches a cross for Wrexham at Wembley 2013 during the Conference Premier Play-Off Final defeat against Newport County

On Transfer deadline day in January 2013 Maxwell signed for his former club Wrexham on loan for the remainder of the 2012–13 season after first team goalkeeper Joslain Mayebi was ruled out with an injury for the rest of the season. Maxwell made his second Wrexham debut in a Conference Premier match away to Forest Green Rovers. In March 2013 Maxwell picked up his first career honour winning the FA Trophy at Wembley with Wrexham. Wrexham went on to play at Wembley a second time where they lost to Newport County in the Conference play-off final.

==== Cambridge United loan ====
Maxwell signed for Cambridge United on loan until January 2014 and quickly established himself as part of the team. He was handed the number 1 shirt by manager Richard Money despite being on loan and made his team debut on the first day of the 2013–14 season with a win against FC Halifax Town. The season started with a 16-game unbeaten run. This was a club record and with 11 clean sheets, 6 of which were consecutive, another club league record was established. Maxwell was awarded the Conference Premier player of the month for October after keeping 5 clean sheets and not conceding throughout the month, this involved saving a penalty as Cambridge beat Grimsby Town 1–0 at Blundell Park. His loan with Cambridge ended on 6 January 2014 and he returned to Fleetwood Town. During his loan period, Maxwell kept a total of 18 clean sheets and conceded only 10 times during 24 league games.

=== Return to Fleetwood Town ===
After Cambridge failed to secure Maxwell's services for the remainder of the season Maxwell again returned to Highbury to battle both Scott Davies and David Lucas for the number one spot. Maxwell finally made his club and simultaneously his Football League debut under new manager Graham Alexander away from home against Wycombe Wanderers in a 1–1 draw on 11 February 2014 Maxwell retained his place for the remainder of the season helping Fleetwood to a fourth-place finish and a place in the League Two play off finals. Maxwell kept a total of 11 clean sheets in 22 games for Fleetwood bringing his season total to 29 in 50 games with 24 in 41 competitive league games. Fleetwood went on to win the play-off final at Wembley on 26 May, beating Burton Albion 1–0 in normal time. Following Fleetwood's promotion to League One, Maxwell signed a two-year contract extension with Fleetwood until the summer of 2016.

Fleetwood made an impressive start to the 2014–15 season with 10 points from the first 4 games good enough to top the League One table. Maxwell continued collecting clean sheets with three consecutive shut outs and only conceding one goal from a penalty in the season opener against Crewe Alexandra. Maxwell continued as the club number one and played every game during the season helping Fleetwood finish in 10th equal on points with Rochdale in 8th place. Only the top three clubs had a better defensive record. Maxwell's efforts were recognised with a number of personal awards; Players Player, Supporters Player of the season and The Community Player of the season.

A change of strategic direction for the 2015–16 season saw the club fighting relegation for the entire season only securing League One status on the last day with a 2–0 win over already relegated Crewe Alexandra. Fleetwood eventually finish in 19th spot above relegated Fylde Coast rivals Blackpool. Despite being constantly in and out of the relegation zone only the top seven clubs had a better defensive record.

Maxwell's effort were recognised with a number of personal awards; The PFA Community Player of the season, the League One unsung hero award for April 2016 and was a finalist in the North West MBNA Football awards for the 2014–15 season.

=== Preston North End ===
On 16 May 2016, Maxwell signed for Championship side Preston North End on a three-year deal, commencing 1 July 2016. He found himself competing for a starting place with Anders Lindegaard who returned to Preston following a loan spell during the previous season, signing on a free transfer from West Brom.

Maxwell made his debut on 23 August in a 2–0 win against Oldham Athletic in the EFL Cup. He made his league debut on 23 September in a 1–0 win against Wigan Athletic. Maxwell replaced Lindegaard as first choice for the remainder of the 2016–17 season, and was rewarded with a contract extension to 2020. At the end of the season, he was named Community Player of season at the club's annual awards.

Declan Rudd was signed by Preston in June 2017, as competition for the number 1 spot. Maxwell secured the starting place for the first game of the 2017–18 season, but Rudd became the regular first choice.

On 2 October 2018, in a game against Aston Villa, with the score level at 3–3, he saved a last minute Glenn Whelan penalty to help his side earn a point. His last appearance for Preston was in a 1–1 draw at Ipswich Town later in October 2018, when he was sent off for two bookable offences.

Maxwell was released by Preston on 22 January 2020.

==== Charlton Athletic loan ====
On 8 January 2019, Maxwell signed for League One side Charlton Athletic on loan until the end of the 2018–19 season. Maxwell returned to Preston at the end of the season, without having made a first team appearance for Charlton.

==== Hibernian loan ====
Maxwell was loaned to Scottish Premiership club Hibernian in July 2019, with the arrangement due to run for the whole of the 2019–20 season. He began the season as deputy to Ofir Marciano who was dropped in September giving Maxwell his first-team chance.

=== Blackpool ===
Maxwell joined Blackpool on 24 January 2020, on a deal until the end of the season. He signed a new two-year contract at the end of the 2019–20 season, taking him until the summer of 2022. In December 2020 he tested positive for COVID-19 and had to self-isolate, missing matches.

Maxwell won the League One EFL Golden Glove for the 2020–21 season after keeping (as of the 4 May victory over Doncaster Rovers) 21 clean sheets. He was named in the League One PFA Team of the Year on 3 June.

On 22 July 2021, Maxwell signed a new two-year contract, with an option to extend by a further twelve months.

=== Huddersfield Town ===
In July 2023 Maxwell joined Huddersfield Town on a two-year contract.

Maxwell announced his retirement on 24 April 2025.

== International career ==
Maxwell is eligible to play for three of the home nations, as he is Welsh by birth, has an English father and a Scottish grandfather. He was a member of the Wales U16 squad that won the 2005 Victory Shield, during the 2005–06 season, won his first U17 cap at the age of 15 and went on to win his first U19 cap at the age of just 16 and three days. During the 2008–09 season, Maxwell added a further two international age groups to his tally; U23 semi professional and U21 honours both before his 19th birthday.

At the start of the 2009–10 season, Maxwell retained his place in the Wales U21 squad and played in all of Wales' Group 3 qualification games for the 2011 UEFA European Under-21 Football Championship. Maxwell continued as number 1 in the Wales U21 squad during 2010 and played in all of the remaining Wales' Group 3 qualification games for the 2011 UEFA European Under-21 Football Championship. Wales narrowly missed out on qualification for the next stage on an away goal rule to Italy. Maxwell continued to be a key member of the 2011–13 Wales U21 squad for qualification games in the 2013 UEFA European Under-21 Football Championship.

Maxwell was called into the senior Wales squad during the buildup to UEFA Euro 2016, due to an injury to Danny Ward. Maxwell remained with the squad during preparations but did not make the final squad when Ward made a full recovery.

== Career statistics ==
Appearances and goals by club, season and competition
Club	Season	League			National Cup		League Cup		Other		Total	
Club	Season	Division	Apps	Goals	Apps	Goals	Apps	Goals	Apps	Goals	Apps	Goals
Wrexham	2008–09	Conference Premier	4	0	0	0	—		0	0	4	0
Wrexham	2009–10	Conference Premier	26	0	3	0	—		0	0	29	0
Wrexham	2010–11	Conference Premier	36	0	1	0	—		4 (Note: Two appearances in FA Trophy, two in Conference Premier play-offs)	0	41	0
Wrexham	2011–12	Conference Premier	10	0	0	0	—		1 (Note: Appearance in FA Trophy)	0	11	0
Wrexham	Total		76	0	4	0	—		5	0	85	0
Connah's Quay Nomads (loan)	2008–09	Welsh Premier League	16	0	0	0	4	0	—		20	0
Fleetwood Town	2012–13	League Two	0	0	0	0	0	0	0	0	0	0
Fleetwood Town	2013–14	League Two	18	0	0	0	0	0	4 (Note: One appearance in Football League Trophy and three in League Two play-offs)	0	22	0
Fleetwood Town	2014–15	League One	46	0	1	0	1	0	1 (Note: Appearance in Football League Trophy)	0	49	0
Fleetwood Town	2015–16	League One	46	0	1	0	1	0	4	0	52	0
Fleetwood Town	Total		110	0	2	0	2	0	9	0	123	0
Wrexham (loan)	2012–13	Conference Premier	17	0	0	0	—		6 (Note: Three appearances in FA Trophy, three in Conference Premier play-offs)	0	23	0
Cambridge United (loan)	2013–14	Conference Premier	24	0	4	0	—		0	0	28	0
Preston North End	2016–17	Championship	38	0	1	0	2	0	—		41	0
Preston North End	2017–18	Championship	30	0	0	0	1	0	—		31	0
Preston North End	2018–19	Championship	8	0	0	0	3	0	—		11	0
Preston North End	2019–20	Championship	0	0	0	0	0	0	—		0	0
Preston North End	Total		76	0	1	0	6	0	0	0	83	0
Charlton Athletic (loan)	2018–19	League One	0	0	0	0	0	0	0	0	0	0
Hibernian (loan)	2019–20	Scottish Premiership	12	0	0	0	5	0	—		17	0
Blackpool	2019–20	League One	9	0	0	0	0	0	0	0	9	0
Blackpool	2020–21	League One	43	0	4	0	1	0	5 (Note: Two appearances in EFL Trophy and three in League One play-offs)	0	53	0
Blackpool	2021–22	Championship	21	0	0	0	0	0	—		21	0
Blackpool	2022–23	Championship	28	0	2	0	1	0	—		31	0
Blackpool	Total		101	0	6	0	2	0	5	0	114	0
Huddersfield Town	2023–24	Championship	9	0	0	0	1	0	—		10	0
Huddersfield Town	2024–25	League One	0	0	1	0	2	0	1 (Note: One appearance in EFL Trophy)	0	4	0
Huddersfield Town	Total		9	0	1	0	3	0	1	0	14	0
Career total			428	0	16	0	22	0	26	0	492	0

== Honours ==
Wrexham

- FA Trophy: 2012–13

Fleetwood Town

- Football League Two play-offs: 2014

Charlton Athletic

- EFL League One play-offs: 2019

Blackpool

- EFL League One play-offs: 2021

Wales U16

- Victory Shield: 2005

Individual

- Wrexham Young Player of the Year: 2009–10, 2010–11.
- Conference Premier Player of the Month: October 2013
- Fleetwood Town Players' Player of the Season: 2014–15
- Fleetwood Town Supporters' Player of the Season: 2014–15
- Fleetwood Town Community Player of the Season: 2014–15
- Fleetwood Town PFA Community Player of the Season: 2015–16
- Football League One Unsung Hero Award: April 2016
- Preston North End Community Player of the Season 2016–17
- EFL League One Golden Glove: 2020–21
- PFA Team of the Year: 2020–21 League One
