= Jordan Lawrence-Gabriel =

English footballer (born 1998)

Jordan Gabriel
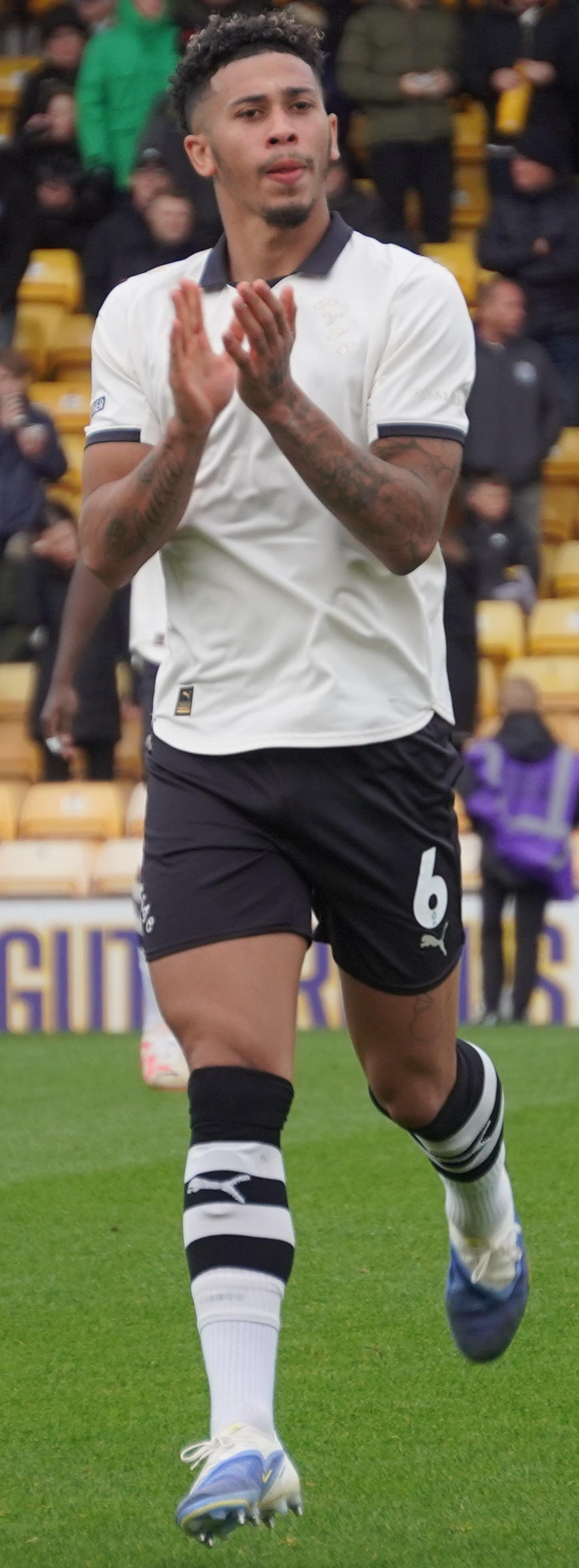
- Gabriel with Port Vale (2025)

Personal information
- Full name: Jordan Jay Lawrence-Gabriel
- Date of birth: 25 September 1998 (age 28)
- Place of birth: London, England
- Height: 1.78 m (5 ft 10 in)
- Position: Right-back

Team information
- Current team: Port Vale
- Number: 6

Youth career
- 2013: Arsenal
- 2014–2015: Southend United
- 2015–2019: Nottingham Forest

Senior career*
Years	Team	Apps	(Gls)
2019–2021	Nottingham Forest	5	(0)
2020	→ Scunthorpe United (loan)	9	(0)
2020–2021	→ Blackpool (loan)	27	(0)
2021–2025	Blackpool	92	(2)
2025–	Port Vale	40	(3)
- * Club domestic league appearances and goals as of 10:23, 22 November 2026 (UTC)

Jordan Jay Lawrence-Gabriel (born 25 September 1998) is an English professional footballer who plays as a right-back for EFL League Two club Port Vale.

Gabriel turned professional at Nottingham Forest in January 2016 after spells in the youth teams of Arsenal and Southend United. He played on loan at Scunthorpe United and Blackpool, before he joined Blackpool for an undisclosed fee in August 2021 after helping the club to win the 2021 League One play-offs. He signed with Port Vale after being released from Blackpool at the end of the 2024–25 season.

== Club career ==
Gabriel spent time in the Academy of his boyhood club Arsenal, though he left at age 14 after feeling picked on and unsupported by coaches.

=== Nottingham Forest ===
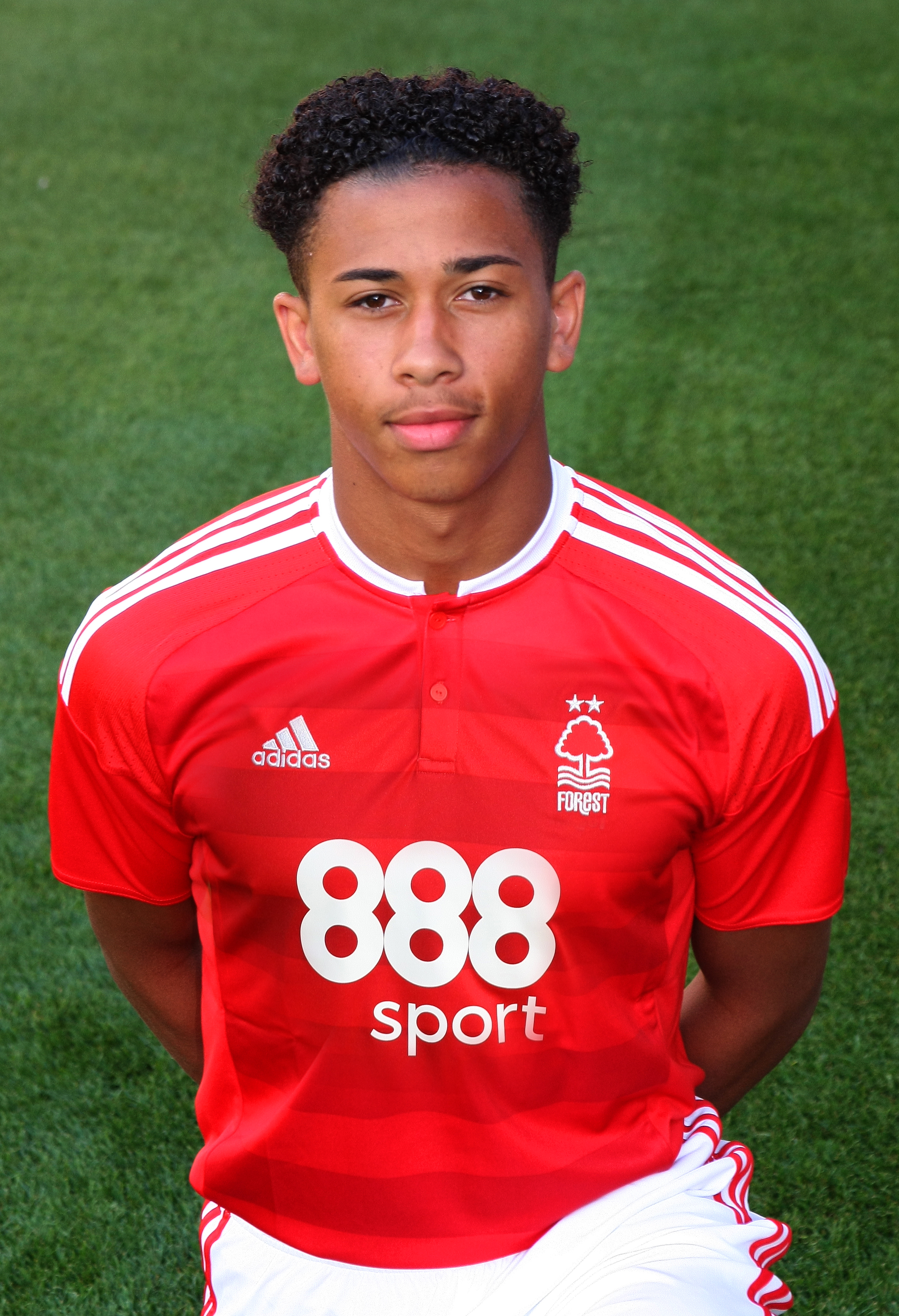
Gabriel with Nottingham Forest in 2016

Gabriel joined the Nottingham Forest academy from Southend United in February 2015. Southend received a 10% sell-on clause, which was later estimated at £70,000. He signed professional terms at the City Ground in January 2016. On 24 September 2019, Gabriel made his professional debut when he appeared as an 81st-minute substitute during a 5–0 loss to Arsenal in the EFL Cup. He featured in two further matches under manager Sabri Lamouchi. He trained with Port Vale in January 2020. However, manager John Askey opted not to take the youngster on loan. Gabriel was loaned to League Two club Scunthorpe United on 24 January 2020 on a deal until the end of the 2019–20 season. He signed a new contract with Forest the following month. He played nine games for Scunthorpe, with gametime at Glanford Park limited due to the COVID-19 pandemic in England.

On 12 September 2020, Gabriel made his Championship debut for Forest, playing the entirety of a 2–0 defeat against Queens Park Rangers. The following month he signed an extension to his contract to keep him at the club until 2024. He started matches at Forest under new manager Chris Hughton at the start of the 2021–22 campaign until Blackpool had a transfer bid of reportedly between £470,000 and £700,000 accepted by Forest. He was also reported to have been a transfer target for Sunderland.

=== Blackpool ===
On 1 October 2020, Gabriel joined League One side Blackpool on loan for the remainder of the 2020–21 season. He scored his first career goal on 28 November in a 4–0 win over Harrogate Town in the second round of the FA Cup. He finished the 2020–21 season with 35 appearances to his name, 17 of which were league starts, helping the club to qualify for the play-offs with a third-place finish. He was an unused substitute in the play-off final at Wembley Stadium as Blackpool secured promotion with victory over Lincoln City.

On 31 August 2021, Gabriel returned to Blackpool, joining on a permanent transfer for an undisclosed fee on a four-year deal. He said he was now at a place where he felt wanted. Burnley were reported to have made a £750,000 bid for the player in July 2022, though Blackpool manager Michael Appleton said he had not heard of any transfer news. In October, Gabriel suffered a torn meniscus after sitting with his legs wrapped around a stool. He played 21 games in the 2021–22 campaign, and was named as the club's PFA community champion due to his time spent away from Bloomfield Road helping good causes. He was sent off twice in the season, receiving particular criticism for his Boxing Day dismissal at Huddersfield Town.

In March 2023, Gabriel said that new manager Mick McCarthy had made a positive impact and said the team had to adapt to avoid relegation. However, he suffered a serious knee injury towards the end of the 2022–23 season and worked on his recovery alongside teammate Kyle Joseph. It took him six months to return to fitness. He was linked with moves to Lincoln City and Oxford United at the end of the 2023–24 season. Blackpool manager Neil Critchley spoke with Gabriel after he posted a message on social media that hinted of a move away from the club. Oxford United had two bids for the player rejected. He was subjected to racist abuse online by Blackpool supporters in December 2024. Manager Steve Bruce said that social media companies had to do more to protect players from abuse online. He was released at the end of the 2024–25 season after having made 37 appearances in all competitions, with Odeluga Offiah taking his first-team place after Gabriel came out of the team because his wife gave birth. His agent, Phil Sproson, stated that the decision for Lawrence-Gabriel to leave Blackpool was a mutual one as the player wished to move south to be closer to his family.

=== Port Vale ===
On 31 May 2025, Gabriel was announced to be joining newly-promoted League One club Port Vale on a two-year deal upon the expiry of his Blackpool contract. Manager Darren Moore confirmed that Gabriel would be out for "some substantial time" after he sustained an injury in a match against AFC Wimbledon in October. He returned to fitness in January for new manager Jon Brady's second game in charge. He showed his best form for the club in March. He was one of the club's strongest performers in the second half of the 2025–26 season, which culminated in relegation. He said the players knew that they had not been good enough and that he was looking to play as a high a level as possible.

He started the 2026–27 campaign in good form, being voted as August Player of the Month by readers of The Valiant substack.

== Style of play ==
Gabriel plays primarily at right-back, though he can also play at left-back if needed. He can also fill in at centre-back on the right side of a back three. An attacking full-back, he likes to take on opponents with his pace, get forward and provide crosses.

== Career statistics ==
As of match played 21 November 2026

Appearances and goals by club, season and competition
Club	Season	League			FA Cup		EFL Cup		Other		Total	
Club	Season	Division	Apps	Goals	Apps	Goals	Apps	Goals	Apps	Goals	Apps	Goals
Nottingham Forest	2019–20	Championship	0	0	0	0	1	0	—		1	0
Nottingham Forest	2020–21	Championship	1	0	0	0	1	0	—		2	0
Nottingham Forest	2021–22	Championship	4	0	0	0	0	0	0	0	4	0
Nottingham Forest	Total		5	0	0	0	2	0	0	0	7	0
Scunthorpe United (loan)	2019–20	League Two	9	0	0	0	—		0	0	9	0
Blackpool (loan)	2020–21	League One	27	0	3	1	—		5 (Note: 3 appearances in the EFL Trophy and 2 appearances in the EFL League One play-offs)	0	35	1
Blackpool	2021–22	Championship	21	0	0	0	0	0	—		21	0
Blackpool	2022–23	Championship	20	0	0	0	1	0	—		21	0
Blackpool	2023–24	League One	21	2	3	2	0	0	4 (Note: Appearances in EFL Trophy)	0	27	4
Blackpool	2024–25	League One	30	0	2	0	2	0	3	0	37	0
Blackpool	Total		119	2	8	3	3	0	12	0	142	5
Port Vale	2025–26	League One	26	2	3	0	3	0	2	0	34	2
Port Vale	2026–27	League Two	14	1	1	0	1	0	3	1	19	2
Port Vale	Total		40	3	4	0	4	0	5	1	53	4
Career total			173	5	12	3	9	0	17	1	211	9

== Honours ==
Blackpool

- EFL League One play-offs: 2021
