= Jerry Yates =

English footballer (born 1996)

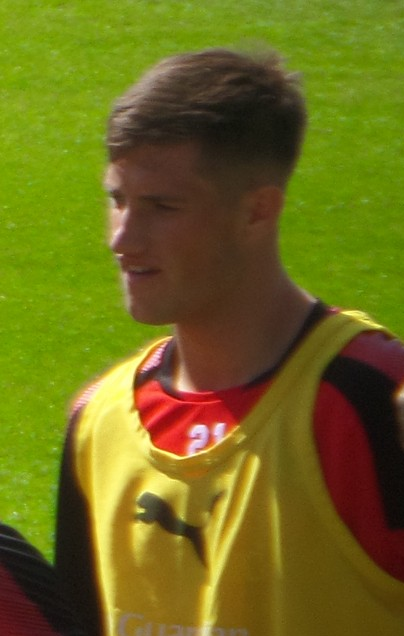
- Yates in 2017

Personal information
- Full name: Jerry Aaron Yates
- Date of birth: 10 November 1996 (age 29)
- Place of birth: Doncaster, England
- Height: 5 ft 9 in (1.75 m)
- Position: Forward

Team information
- Current team: Blackpool (on loan from Luton Town)
- Number: 12

Youth career
- –2014: Rotherham United

Senior career*
Years	Team	Apps	(Gls)
2014–2020	Rotherham United	47	(2)
2015	→ Harrogate Railway Athletic (loan)	3	(2)
2015–2016	→ Harrogate Town (loan)	8	(4)
2018–2019	→ Carlisle United (loan)	23	(6)
2019–2020	→ Swindon Town (loan)	25	(12)
2020	→ Swindon Town (loan)	6	(1)
2020–2023	Blackpool	124	(42)
2023–2025	Swansea City	43	(8)
2024–2025	→ Derby County (loan)	42	(10)
2025–	Luton Town	22	(2)
2026	→ Sheffield Wednesday (loan)	18	(4)
2026–	→ Blackpool (loan)	9	(2)
- * Club domestic league appearances and goals as of 20:47, 25 October 2026 (UTC)

Jerry Aaron Yates (born 10 November 1996) is an English professional footballer who plays as a forward for EFL League One club Blackpool, on loan from EFL League One club Luton Town.

He has previously played for Rotherham United, Harrogate Railway Athletic, Harrogate Town, Carlisle United, Swindon Town, Blackpool, Derby County, Swansea City and Sheffield Wednesday.

== Career ==
Yates began his youth career at Doncaster Rovers. He joined Rotherham United in his late teens.

=== Rotherham United ===
Yates signed professionally for Rotherham United in 2014. He scored his first senior goal while on loan at Harrogate Railway Athletic in February 2015. He made his debut in the Football League on 3 April 2015, coming on as an 85th-minute substitute for Richard Smallwood in a 2–1 defeat to Birmingham City at St Andrew's. He had a loan spell with Harrogate Town cut short during the 2015–16 season as the Millers needed cover due to injuries. During Yates's loan spell at Harrogate Town, he totalled eight appearances and scored four goals. He scored his first professional goals for Rotherham when he scored twice in a 5–4 EFL Cup loss against Morecambe on 9 August 2016. On 14 January 2017 he scored the opening goal against Norwich City on his full league debut. Rotherham United went on to win the game 2–1.

Yates would make 20 appearances throughout the 2017–18 season, helping Rotherham achieve promotion via the EFL League One play-offs.

==== Carlisle United (loan) ====
On 20 July 2018, Yates headed out on loan to League Two side Carlisle United until January for the 2018–19 season. He scored his first goal for Carlisle in a 3–2 EFL Trophy win over Morecambe on 4 September 2018. Yates scored an 88th-minute winner in a 2–1 win at home to Macclesfield Town in Carlisle's last match of 2018. It was his sixth goal in as many games. Yates was recalled by Rotherham on 1 January to provide cover for injuries.

==== Swindon Town (loan) ====
On 20 June 2019, Yates joined League Two team Swindon Town on a season-long loan. He scored his first goal for Swindon in a 2–0 win away to Scunthorpe on the opening weekend of the EFL League Two season. He scored his second goal in a 3–2 win at home to his old club, Carlisle on 10 August 2019. After scoring twelve goals in the first half of the season, he was recalled early from his loan spell on 21 January 2020. On 29 January 2020 Yates rejoined Swindon Town on loan until the end season.

=== Blackpool ===
Yates joined Blackpool for an undisclosed fee on 21 July 2020, signing a three-year contract, with the club having the option to extend it for a further year. He scored his first goals for the club when he netted twice in a 2–1 win over Burton Albion on 31 October 2020.

Yates ended the 2020–21 season as Blackpool's top scorer, with 23 goals. 20 of those came in the League, which is the joint-highest total scored by a Blackpool player since Andy Watson in 1993–94.

Yates was voted the PFA Fans' Player of the Year for the 2020–21 League One campaign. He signed a new three-year contract with the club on 23 July 2021. It included an option for a further twelve months.

At the start to the 2022–23 season, seven goals and an assist across seven matches saw Yates win the EFL Championship Player of the Month award for October 2022.

=== Swansea City ===
In July 2023, Yates joined Championship club Swansea City on a three-year deal following Blackpool's relegation to League One. Yates played 46 times in his first season for Swansea, scoring 9 goals.

==== Derby County (loan) ====
On 2 July 2024, Yates joined fellow Championship club Derby County on loan for the 2024–25 season. After missing Derby's first three matches of the season due to a red-card suspension from the previous season, Yates made his Derby County debut in a 2–1 defeat to Watford on 24 August 2024. He scored his first Derby goal in a 1–1 draw at Millwall on 19 October 2024. Yates held a regular place as Derby's main starting striker during the season and after injuries to Dajaune Brown, Kemar Roofe and Lars-Jørgen Salvesen, Yates became Derby's only fit senior striker for the last two months of the season. Yates scored 10 times in 42 Championship appearances for Derby during his loan spell and was the clubs top scorer as Derby avoided relegation to League One by one point.

=== Luton Town ===
On 1 August 2025, Yates signed for League One club Luton Town for a reported seven-figure fee.

==== Sheffield Wednesday (loan) ====
On 30 January 2026, Yates joined Championship club Sheffield Wednesday on loan for the remainder of the season. He made his debut the following day, starting in the 0–1 defeat to Wrexham. On 28 February 2026, he scored his first goal for Wednesday, at home to Southampton with a diving header. He won the club's Player of the Month award for March after scoring three goals in three games, the first against Southampton the previous month, and then goals against Derby County and Watford.

== Career statistics ==
As of match played 24 October 2026

Appearances and goals by club, season and competition
Club	Season	League			FA Cup		EFL Cup		Other		Total	
Club	Season	Division	Apps	Goals	Apps	Goals	Apps	Goals	Apps	Goals	Apps	Goals
Rotherham United	2014–15	Championship	1	0	0	0	0	0	–		1	0
Rotherham United	2015–16	Championship	0	0	0	0	0	0	–		0	0
Rotherham United	2016–17	Championship	21	1	1	0	1	2	–		23	3
Rotherham United	2017–18	League One	17	1	0	0	0	0	3 (Note: Appearances in EFL Trophy)	1	20	2
Rotherham United	2018–19	Championship	7	0	0	0	0	0	—		7	0
Rotherham United	2019–20	League One	1	0	–		–		–		1	0
Rotherham United	Total		47	2	1	0	1	2	3	1	52	5
Harrogate Railway Athletic (loan)	2014–15	NPL Division One North	3	2	0	0	–		0	0	3	2
Harrogate Town (loan)	2015–16	National League North	8	4	0	0	–		0	0	8	4
Carlisle United (loan)	2018–19	League Two	23	6	2	0	1	0	3	1	29	7
Swindon Town (loan)	2019–20	League Two	25	12	2	1	1	0	1	0	29	13
Swindon Town (loan)	2019–20	League Two	6	1	–		–		–		6	1
Swindon Town (loan)	Total		31	13	2	1	1	0	1	0	35	14
Blackpool	2020–21	League One	44	20	3	2	1	0	6 (Note: Three appearances and one goal in EFL League One play-offs, three appearances in EFL Trophy)	1	54	23
Blackpool	2021–22	Championship	39	8	1	0	2	0	–		42	8
Blackpool	2022–23	Championship	41	14	2	1	0	0	–		43	15
Blackpool	Total		124	42	6	3	3	0	6	1	139	46
Swansea City	2023–24	Championship	43	8	2	1	1	0	—		46	9
Swansea City	2024–25	Championship	0	0	0	0	0	0	—		0	0
Swansea City	Total		43	8	2	1	1	0	0	0	46	9
Derby County (loan)	2024–25	Championship	42	10	0	0	0	0	—		42	10
Luton Town	2025–26	League One	22	2	2	1	1	0	4	4	24	7
Luton Town	2026–27	League One	0	0	0	0	0	0	0	0	0	0
Luton Town	Total		22	2	2	1	1	0	4	4	24	7
Sheffield Wednesday (loan)	2025–26	Championship	18	4	—		—		—		18	4
Blackpool (loan)	2026–27	League One	9	2	0	0	—		2	1	11	3
Career total			367	95	14	6	8	2	19	8	408	111

== Honours ==
Rotherham United

- EFL League One play-offs: 2018

Swindon Town

- EFL League Two: 2019–20

Blackpool

- EFL League One play-offs: 2021

Individual

- Rotherham United Young Player of the Year: 2014–15, 2016–17
- PFA Fans' Player of the Year: 2020–21 League One
- PFA Team of the Year: 2019–20 League Two
- Blackpool Players' Player of the Season: 2020–21, 2022–23
- EFL Championship Player of the Month: October 2022
- EFL Championship Goal of the Month: November 2024
