= Ollie Turton =

English footballer (born 1992)

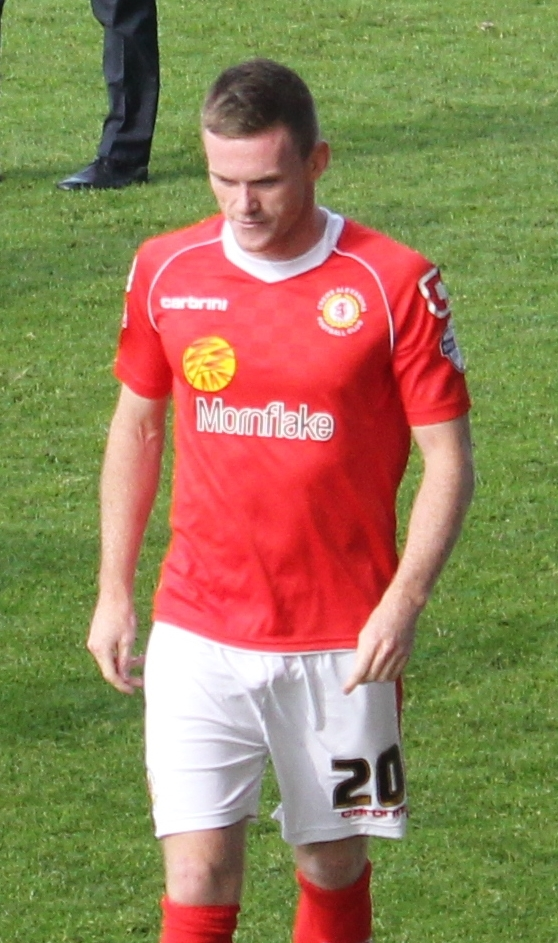
- Turton playing for Crewe Alexandra in 2014

Personal information
- Full name: Oliver Anthony Turton
- Date of birth: 6 December 1992 (age 33)
- Place of birth: Manchester, England
- Height: 5 ft 11 in (1.80 m)
- Positions: Right back; central midfielder

Team information
- Current team: Salford City
- Number: 20

Youth career
- –2010: Crewe Alexandra

Senior career*
Years	Team	Apps	(Gls)
2010–2017	Crewe Alexandra	170	(4)
2011–2012	→ Market Drayton Town (loan)		
2017–2021	Blackpool	140	(2)
2021–2025	Huddersfield Town	89	(1)
2025–	Salford City	38	(1)
- * Club domestic league appearances and goals as of 20:59, 23 April 2026 (UTC)

Oliver Anthony Turton (born 6 December 1992) is an English professional footballer who plays as a right-back or central midfielder for EFL League Two club Salford City. He has also played for Crewe Alexandra, Blackpool, and Huddersfield Town.

== Early life ==
Turton was born in Manchester, Greater Manchester.

== Career ==
=== Crewe Alexandra ===
Turton began his professional career with Crewe Alexandra in 2010. He joined Northern Premier League Division One South club Market Drayton Town on loan along with Jason Oswell. He made his debut, aged 18, for Crewe in a League Two match against Stockport County at Gresty Road on 30 April 2011, which ended in a 2–0 win for Crewe. He came on as a late substitute for Mat Mitchel-King.

He scored his first Crewe goal in a 1–1 draw at Oldham Athletic on 21 September 2013.

On 9 May 2017, Crewe announced that Turton had been offered a new contract, though manager David Artell gave a 22 May deadline for a decision otherwise the offer would be rescinded. On 23 May Turton reported for training but had not yet clarified his decision to Artell. After a further 24 hours reflection, Turton decided not to accept the club's contract offer and opted to become a free agent.

=== Blackpool ===
In June 2017, Turton signed a two-year contract with League One side Blackpool. He made his Blackpool debut in the club's season-opening fixture at Bradford City on 5 August 2017, and scored his first goal for the club in a 3-3 draw at Doncaster Rovers two weeks later.

Turton signed a new one-year contract with the club in July 2020.

=== Huddersfield Town ===
Turton turned down the offer of a new contract at Blackpool, instead opting to sign for Huddersfield Town on 3 June 2021.

He was released upon the expiration of his contract at the end of the 2024–25 season.

=== Salford City ===
On 8 August 2025, Turton was signed by EFL League Two club Salford City, and made his debut in the side's 2–1 win at Notts County the following day. During his 500th senior career appearance, Turton scored his second Salford goal in a 2–0 win over Bromley on 23 April 2026. In July 2026, he signed a new one-year deal with the club.

== Career statistics ==
As of 23 April 2026

Appearances and goals by club, season and competition
Club	Season	League			FA Cup		League Cup		Other		Total	
Club	Season	Division	Apps	Goals	Apps	Goals	Apps	Goals	Apps	Goals	Apps	Goals
Crewe Alexandra	2009–10	League Two	0	0	0	0	0	0	0	0	0	0
Crewe Alexandra	2010–11	League Two	1	0	0	0	0	0	0	0	1	0
Crewe Alexandra	2011–12	League Two	2	0	0	0	0	0	1 (Note: Appearance in the Football League Trophy)	0	3	0
Crewe Alexandra	2012–13	League One	20	0	1	0	2	0	1	0	24	0
Crewe Alexandra	2013–14	League One	12	1	0	0	1	0	1	0	14	1
Crewe Alexandra	2014–15	League One	44	1	2	0	2	0	1	0	49	1
Crewe Alexandra	2015–16	League One	46	1	1	0	1	0	1	0	49	1
Crewe Alexandra	2016–17	League Two	45	1	1	0	2	0	2 (Note: Appearance(s) in the EFL Trophy)	0	50	1
Crewe Alexandra	Total		170	4	5	0	8	0	7	0	190	4
Blackpool	2017–18	League One	41	1	1	0	0	0	1	0	43	1
Blackpool	2018–19	League One	32	1	1	0	3	0	2	0	38	1
Blackpool	2019–20	League One	30	0	4	0	1	1	4	0	39	1
Blackpool	2020–21	League One	37	0	2	0	1	0	5 (Note: Two appearances in the EFL Trophy, three appearances and one goal in the EFL League One play-offs)	1	45	1
Blackpool	Total		140	2	8	0	5	1	12	1	165	4
Huddersfield Town	2021–22	Championship	40	0	1	0	2	0	1 (Note: One appearance in the EFL Championship playoffs)	0	44	0
Huddersfield Town	2022–23	Championship	18	0	0	0	0	0	0	0	18	0
Huddersfield Town	2023–24	Championship	3	0	0	0	0	0	0	0	3	0
Huddersfield Town	2024–25	League One	28	1	1	0	2	0	3	0	34	1
Huddersfield Town	Total		89	1	2	0	4	0	4	0	99	1
Salford City	2025–26	League Two	38	1	4	0	1	0	3	1	46	2
Career total			437	8	19	0	18	1	26	2	500	11

== Honours ==
Crewe Alexandra

- Football League Trophy: 2012–13

Blackpool

- EFL League One play-offs: 2021
