= 2021 EFL play-offs =

Football competitions

- Wembley Stadium was the venue for each play-off final
- Season: 2020–21

The English Football League play-offs for the 2020–21 season (referred to as the Sky Bet Play-Offs for sponsorship reasons) were held in May 2021, with all finals played at Wembley Stadium in London. The play-offs begin in each league with two semi-finals played over two legs. The teams who finished in 3rd, 4th, 5th, and 6th place in the Championship and League One and the 4th, 5th, 6th, and 7th-placed teams in League Two are set to compete. The winners of the semi-finals advance to the finals, with the winner of the final gaining promotion for the following season.

The away goals rule does not apply in the play-off semi-finals per the standard rules.

== Background ==
The English Football League play-offs have been held every year since 1987. They take place for each division following the conclusion of the regular season and are contested by the four clubs finishing below the automatic promotion places. The fixtures are determined by final league position – in the Championship and League One this is 3rd v 6th and 4th v 5th, while in League Two it is 4th v 7th and 5th v 6th.

== Championship ==
=== Qualified teams ===
Final league position – Championship
Pos	Team	Pld	W	D	L	GF	GA	GD	Pts
3	Brentford	46	24	15	7	79	42	+37	87
4	Swansea City	46	23	11	12	56	39	+17	80
5	Barnsley	46	23	9	14	58	50	+8	78
6	Bournemouth	46	22	11	13	73	46	+27	77

=== First leg ===
17 May 2021
18:00 BST

Bournemouth	1–0	Brentford
Danjuma 55'	Report

Vitality Stadium, Boscombe
Attendance: 2,000
Referee: Tim Robinson
17 May 2021
20:15 BST

Barnsley	0–1	Swansea City
	Report	A. Ayew 39'

Oakwell, Barnsley
Attendance: 4,000
Referee: Geoff Eltringham

=== Second leg ===
22 May 2021
12:30 BST

Brentford	3–1	Bournemouth
Toney 16' (pen.); Janelt 50'; Forss 81'	Report	Danjuma 5'

Brentford Community Stadium, London
Attendance: 4,000
Referee: Jarred Gillett

Brentford won 3–2 on aggregate.

22 May 2021
17:30 BST

Swansea City	1–1	Barnsley
Grimes 39'	Report	Woodrow 71'

Liberty Stadium, Swansea
Attendance: 3,000
Referee: John Brooks

Swansea City won 2–1 on aggregate.

=== Championship final ===
29 May 2021
15:00 BST

Brentford	2–0	Swansea City
Toney 10' (pen.); Marcondes 20'	Report

Wembley Stadium, London
Attendance: 11,689
Referee: Chris Kavanagh

== League One ==
Final league position – League One
Pos	Team	Pld	W	D	L	GF	GA	GD	Pts
3	Blackpool	46	23	11	12	60	37	+27	80
4	Sunderland	46	20	17	9	70	42	+28	77
5	Lincoln City	46	22	11	13	69	50	+19	77
6	Oxford United	46	22	8	16	77	56	+21	74

First leg

18 May 2021
18:00 BST

Oxford United	0–3	Blackpool
	Report	Turton 23'; Simms 26', 74'

Kassam Stadium, Oxford
Attendance: 3,224
Referee: Bobby Madley
19 May 2021
18:00 BST

Lincoln City	2–0	Sunderland
Hopper 51'; Johnson 77'	Report

Sincil Bank, Lincoln
Attendance: 3,145
Referee: Craig Hicks

Second leg

21 May 2021
19:45 BST

Blackpool	3–3	Oxford United
Embleton 11'; Dougall 13'; Yates 54'	Report	Taylor 7'; Atkinson 52'; Shodipo 74'

Bloomfield Road, Blackpool
Attendance: 4,000
Referee: Keith Stroud

Blackpool won 6–3 on aggregate.

22 May 2021
15:00 BST

Sunderland	2–1	Lincoln City
Stewart 13'; Wyke 33'	Report	Hopper 56'

Stadium of Light, Sunderland
Attendance: 9,971
Referee: Michael Salisbury

Lincoln City won 3–2 on aggregate.

=== Final ===
30 May 2021
15:00 BST

Blackpool	2–1	Lincoln City
Dougall 34', 54'	Report	Turton 1' (o.g.)

Wembley Stadium, London
Attendance: 9,751
Referee: Tony Harrington

== League Two ==
Final league position – League Two
Pos	Team	Pld	W	D	L	GF	GA	GD	Pts
4	Morecambe	46	23	9	14	69	58	+11	78
5	Newport County	46	20	13	13	57	42	+15	73
6	Forest Green Rovers	46	20	13	13	59	51	+8	73
7	Tranmere Rovers	46	20	13	13	55	50	+5	73

First leg

18 May 2021
20:15 BST

Newport County	2–0	Forest Green Rovers
Dolan 31'; Collins 56'	Report

Rodney Parade, Newport
Attendance: 900
Referee: Charles Breakspear
20 May 2021
18:00 BST

Tranmere Rovers	1–2	Morecambe
Clarke 19'	Report	Knight-Percival 15'; McAlinden 45+1'

Prenton Park, Birkenhead
Attendance: 3,400
Referee: Darren Drysdale

Second leg

23 May 2021
12:30 BST

Morecambe	1–1	Tranmere Rovers
Wildig 9'	Report	Vaughan 53'

Mazuma Stadium, Morecambe
Attendance: 1,558
Referee: Thomas Bramall

Morecambe won 3–2 on aggregate.

23 May 2021
18:30 BST

Forest Green Rovers	4–3 (a.e.t.)	Newport County
Adams 7'; Collins 8'; Cadden 53'; Matt 87'	Report	Ellison 70'; Labadie 77'; Maynard 119'

The New Lawn, Nailsworth
Attendance: 1,300
Referee: Martin Coy

Newport County won 5–4 on aggregate.

=== Final ===
31 May 2021
15:00 BST

Morecambe	1–0 (a.e.t.)	Newport County
Mendes Gomes 107' (pen.)	Report

Wembley Stadium, London
Attendance: 9,083
Referee: Bobby Madley
