= 2025–26 Blackpool F.C. season =

English football club season

Blackpool F.C.
2025–26 season
- Owner: Simon Sadler
- Head coach: Steve Bruce (until 4 October); Ian Evatt (from 21 October)
- Stadium: Bloomfield Road
- League One: 13th
- FA Cup: Third round
- EFL Cup: First round
- EFL Trophy: Round of 32
- Top goalscorer: League: Ashley Fletcher (15); All: Ashley Fletcher (21)
- Highest home attendance: 11,579 v Bolton Wanderers (30 Aug 2025, League One)
- Lowest home attendance: 960 v Nottingham Forest U21 (14 Oct 2025, EFL Trophy)
- Average home league attendance: 10,035
- Biggest win: 5–0 v Barrow (Home, 16 Sept 2025, EFL Trophy)
- Biggest defeat: 5–1 v Port Vale (Away, 1 Jan 2026, League One); 0–4 v Plymouth Argyle (Home, 14 Feb 2026, League One); 4–0 v Lincoln City (Away, 28 Feb 2026, League One)
Home colours	Away colours	Third colours

The 2025–26 season was the 117th season in the history of Blackpool Football Club, and their third-consecutive season in League One, the third tier of English professional football. They were also active in three cup competitions: they were knocked out of the EFL Cup in the first round, reached the second round of the EFL Trophy and the third round of the FA Cup.

== Managerial changes ==
On 4 October, Steve Bruce was sacked as head coach after 61 games in charge and a 34.4% win ratio. Seventeen days later, former Blackpool captain Ian Evatt was appointed as the new head coach on a three-year contract.

== Pre-season ==
Transfers which were announced in June and became official on 1 July:

- centre-back Fraser Horsfall, having left Stockport County on a free transfer
- fellow centre-back Michael Ihiekwe, joining on a free transfer from Sheffield Wednesday
- midfielder Sonny Carey, signing for Charlton Athletic after rejecting the offer of a new contract from Blackpool
- midfielder George Honeyman, who left Millwall on a free transfer
- goalkeeper Franco Ravizzoli, upon the expiration of his contract with Wycombe Wanderers
- defender Jordan Lawrence-Gabriel joined Port Vale
- midfielder Oliver Norburn joined Notts County
- goalkeeper Richard O'Donnell signed for Derby County

On 25 June, forward Jake Beesley joined Burton Albion and defender Matthew Pennington signed for Bradford City, both for an undisclosed fee. The same day, forward Niall Ennis, who had been on loan with the club the previous season, signed from Stoke City for an undisclosed fee on a two-year contract.

Midfielder Jordan Brown joined from Leyton Orient on 8 July, again for an undisclosed amount.

On 15 July, defender Danny Imray joined on a season-long loan from Crystal Palace. He was recalled by the Premier League club in January.

Another midfielder, Rob Apter, signed for Charlton Athletic on 17 July for an undisclosed fee.

On 18 July, Birmingham City goalkeeper Bailey Peacock-Farrell joined on loan until the end of the campaign.

Josh Miles joined Irish club Waterford for an undisclosed fee on 25 July.

=== Fixtures ===
The first two pre-season friendlies to be announced was against Squires Gate and AFC Fylde on 12 July. On 5 June, Blackpool announced a home friendly with West Bromwich Albion had been arranged for 19 July. A friendly against Salford City at the Manchester club's Peninsula Stadium was scheduled for 22 July. On 20 June, a fifth friendly was announced against Doncaster Rovers.

A behind-closed-doors friendly against Accrington Stanley was also announced.

Win Draw Loss Fixtures

5 July 2025 Friendly	Squires Gate	1–0	Blackpool XI	Squires Gate
15:00 BST		Report		Stadium: The Brian Addison Stadium

8 July 2025 Friendly	Blackpool	0–1	Accrington Stanley	Squires Gate
12:30 BST		Report	Woods	Stadium: Blackpool's training ground Attendance: 0 (behind-closed-doors)

12 July 2025 Friendly	AFC Fylde	3–4	Blackpool	Medlar-with-Wesham
15:00 BST	Ustabaşı 6'; Ormerod 30'; Mohammed 70'	Report	Bloxham 4'; Hamilton 9'; Evans 15' (pen.), 40'	Stadium: Mill Farm Sports Village

15 July 2025 Friendly	Fleetwood Town	3–0	Blackpool	Thornton-Cleveleys
11:00 BST	Hume; Devonport; Neal	Report		Stadium: Poolfoot Farm; Attendance: 0 (behind-closed-doors)

19 July 2025 Friendly	Blackpool	2–1	West Bromwich Albion	Blackpool
15:00 BST	Ennis 15'; Brown 23'	Report	Diakité 26'	Stadium: Bloomfield Road

22 July 2025 Friendly	Salford City	0–0	Blackpool	Salford
19:30 BST		Report		Stadium: Peninsula Stadium

26 July 2025 Friendly	Doncaster Rovers	1–1	Blackpool	Doncaster
15:00 BST	Bailey 51'	Report	Fletcher 26'	Stadium: Eco-Power Stadium

== Season proper ==
=== August ===
On 1 August, Swedish winger Emil Hansson joined Blackpool on a season-long loan from Birmingham City. The following day, Blackpool began the League One season with a 3–2 home defeat to Stevenage. George Honeyman (on his debut) and Niall Ennis scored the goals for the hosts.

Four days later, the club signed forward Malcolm Ebiowei from Crystal Palace for an undisclosed fee.

On 7 August, Blackpool signed Northern Ireland forward Dale Taylor from Nottingham Forest for an undisclosed fee, rumoured to have broken the club's incoming transfer record.

Two days later, Blackpool made it two defeats in as many fixtures, after a 4–1 scoreline at Exeter City. Ashley Fletcher scored his first goal of the season for the visitors, who dropped to 22nd place. Due to a clerical error, resulting in an issue with his registration with the Football League, Dale Taylor was unable to make his debut.

On 12 August, Blackpool exited the EFL Cup at the first hurdle. They lost 1–0 to Port Vale at Bloomfield Road.

Blackpool recorded their first victory on 16 August, a 3–2 scoreline against Huddersfield Town at Bloomfield Road. Niall Ennis, who scored two of the hosts' goals, was sent off late in the first half. Lee Evans scored the other goal for Blackpool, who climbed five places to 17th with the three points.

A third defeat for Blackpool in their opening four league games followed at Mansfield Town on 19 August. Mansfield scored twice in the first ten minutes of the second half to take all three points.

A trip to Plymouth Argyle on 23 August resulted in a single-goal defeat, dropping Blackpool two places to 20th.

Bolton Wanderers visited Bloomfield Road on 30 August, and returned home with a point after a 1–1 draw. Blackpool's goal was an own goal by visiting goalkeeper Teddy Sharman-Lowe. The hosts remained 20th in the table.

=== September ===
After a two-week break, on 13 September Blackpool lost by a single goal at Northampton Town. They dropped one place to second-bottom, having picked up four points from a possible 21.

Blackpool got their first victory in exactly one month on 16 September, a 5–0 scoreline over Barrow in the League Trophy. Scott Banks (2) and Dale Taylor scored their first goals for the club, with Andy Lyons and Ashley Fletcher scoring the other goals.

A second-successive victory followed on 20 September, a single-goal victory over Barnsley at Bloomfield Road in League One. Jordan Brown's goal came in the eighth minute of stoppage time. Blackpool climbed one place to 22nd.

On 27 September, Blackpool lost 1–0 at Bradford City. This was followed by a 2–2 home draw against Luton Town, despite the hosts having been two goals up inside an hour.

=== October ===
On 4 October, AFC Wimbledon beat Blackpool 2–0 at Bloomfield Road. Steve Bruce was sacked as manager shortly thereafter, replaced in the interim by coaches Stephen Dobbie and Steve Banks.

Seven days later, Blackpool lost for the eighth time in their opening twelve league fixtures, this time at Stockport County, leaving them second-bottom in the table.

On 14 October, Blackpool recorded their second-consecutive win in the EFL League Trophy, beating Nottingham Forest Under-21s 2–1 at Bloomfield Road. Emil Hansson and Josh Bowler scored for the hosts.

A draw followed on 18 October, 1–1 at home to Wycombe Wanderers in League One. The visitors equalised twelve minutes into stoppage time.

Ian Evatt was installed as the club's new head coach on 21 October, signing a two-and-a-half-year contract. Four days later, Blackpool beat second-bottom Peterborough United 2–1 at London Road Stadium, with goals by Josh Bowler and Scott Banks. Blackpool switched places in the table with the hosts, leading to Darren Ferguson's dismissal as manager a few hours later.

On 1 November, Blackpool secured a place in the second round of the FA Cup, beating Scunthorpe United at Bloomfield Road by a single Ashley Fletcher goal after 17 minutes.

=== November ===
Blackpool continued their 100% start under Ian Evatt with a 3–1 victory over Cardiff City at Bloomfield Road on 8 November. Ashley Fletcher scored twice and Tom Bloxham got the third for the hosts, who climbed two places to 21st.

On 11 November, Blackpool lost 2–1 at Tranmere Rovers in the EFL Trophy, but still progressed to the next stage of the competition after finishing second in the group.

A second-consecutive defeat followed on 15 November, 1–0 at Burton Albion. Blackpool dropped one place to 22nd.

A week later, Blackpool returned from Leyton Orient with a point after Ashley Fletcher's injury-time equaliser in a 1–1 draw. The visitors remained 22nd.

Blackpool lost 3–0 at home to Reading on 29 November. They remained 22nd.

=== December ===
Blackpool exited the EFL Trophy in the second round after a 4–2 defeat at League Two Harrogate Town on 2 December.

On 7 December, Blackpool beat Mark Hughes's Carlisle United 4–1 at Bloomfield Road to reach the third round of the FA Cup. Ashley Fletcher (2), Tom Bloxham and Scott Banks scored for Blackpool.

Three days later, Blackpool won 3–0 at Rotherham United, with goals by Danny Imray, Tom Bloxham and Ashley Fletcher. Blackpool remained 22nd.

Blackpool dropped to second-bottom after a 2–2 draw at home to Lincoln City on 13 December. The hosts' goals came from Lee Evans (penalty) and Ashley Fletcher.

On 20 December, Blackpool won 2–0 at Wigan Athletic. Ashley Fletcher (his thirteenth goal of the season) and Dale Taylor (his first league goal for the club) were the scorers.

Blackpool beat Doncaster Rovers 1–0 at Bloomfield Road on 26 December. Tom Bloxham got the goal on 17 minutes, having come on as an early substitute for the injured Dale Taylor. It was their first Boxing Day victory since 2016. Blackpool climbed to 19th with the three points.

2025 was closed out with a fourth victory and fourth clean sheet in five games with a 4–0 victory at home to Rotherham. Josh Bowler, Danny Imray, Ashley Fletcher and Tom Bloxham got the goals. The visitors were reduced to ten men on 58 minutes. Blackpool climbed six places to 13th.

=== January ===
The new year began with a 5–1 defeat at Port Vale, with Blackpool having been reduced to ten men in the first half after James Husband was sent off. Tom Bloxham got Blackpool's goal, which opened the scoring. The visitors dropped four places to 13th.

On 4 January, Blackpool lost 2–1 at home to Bradford City. Ashley Fletcher scored his fifteenth goal in all competitions for Blackpool, who dropped to 18th.

Blackpool exited the FA Cup at the third-round stage on 10 January at the hands of Ipswich Town.

On 14 January, defender Kamarl Grant joined on loan from Millwall until the end of the season. Three days later, Blackpool lost a third-successive league match, 2–1 at Barnsley. They dropped two places to 20th.

Five days later, with the club having six players out injured, James Husband serving the remainder of his ban and Danny Imray having been recalled from his loan, Blackpool brought in Bolton Wanderers midfielder Joel Randall on loan until the end of the season. He was followed by forward Michael Obafemi, on loan from Burnley.

Blackpool won for the first time in 2026 with a 2–0 scoreline at home to Northampton Town on 24 January. Zac Ashworth, with his first goal for the club, and Ashley Fletcher, from the penalty spot, were the scorers. It was Fletcher's eighteenth goal of the season. Blackpool climbed to 17th in the table.

A 2–1 defeat at home to Stockport County followed on 27 January. Josh Bowler scored in injury time for the hosts, who climbed one place to 16th despite the loss.

On 31 January, Blackpool lost their fifth league game out of six with a single-goal scoreline at Luton Town. They remained 16th.

=== February ===
On 2 February 2026, transfer-deadline day, right-back Reuell Walters joined Blackpool on loan from Luton Town for the remainder of the season. He was followed by midfielder Karoy Anderson from Charlton Athletic. Midfielder Leighton Clarkson signed from Aberdeen on a two-and-a-half-year contract. Departing, on a permanent deal for an undisclosed fee, was midfielder Lee Evans to Bradford City.

Blackpool drew 2–2 at Huddersfield Town on 7 February, despite having been two goals up at half time. Ashley Fletcher and Karoy Anderson, on his debut, got the goals for the visitors, who dropped one place to 17th.

=== Competitions ===
==== League One ====
===== League table =====
Pos	Team	Pld	W	D	L	GF	GA	GD	Pts
11	Wycombe Wanderers	46	17	12	17	69	58	+11	63
12	Reading	46	16	15	15	64	60	+4	63
13	Blackpool	46	17	9	20	54	65	−11	60
14	Doncaster Rovers	46	17	9	20	50	69	−19	60
15	Barnsley	46	15	14	17	68	73	−5	59

Source: EFL Official Website
Rules for classification: 1) Points; 2) Goal difference; 3) Number of goals scored; 4) Head-to-head results; 5) Wins; 6) Away goals; 7) Penalty points (sec 9.5); 8) 12-point sending off offences

===== Results summary =====
Overall								Home						Away					
Pld	W	D	L	GF	GA	GD	Pts	W	D	L	GF	GA	GD	W	D	L	GF	GA	GD
46	17	9	20	54	65	−11	60	12	5	6	35	29	+6	5	4	14	19	36	−17

Last updated: complete.
Source: Soccerway

===== Results by round =====
Round	1	2	3	4	5	6	7	8	9	10	11	12	13	14	15	16	17	18	19	20	21	22	23	24	25	26	27	28	29	30	31	32	33	34	35	36	37	38	39	40	41	42	43	44	45	46
Ground	H	A	H	A	A	H	A	H	A	H	H	A	H	A	H	A	A	H	A	H	A	H	H	A	H	A	H	H	A	A	H	H	A	A	H	A	A	H	A	H	H	A	H	A	H	A
Result	L	L	W	L	L	D	L	W	L	D	L	L	D	W	W	L	D	L	W	D	W	W	W	L	L	L	W	L	L	D	L	W	D	L	D	L	L	W	D	W	W	L	W	W	W	W
Position	13	22	17	18	20	21	23	23	23	23	23	23	24	23	21	22	22	22	22	23	22	19	13	17	20	22	17	19	19	19	22	21	20	21	21	21	21	21	21	20	19	20	19	16	14	13
Points	0	0	3	3	3	4	4	7	7	8	8	8	9	12	15	15	16	16	19	20	23	26	29	29	29	29	32	32	32	33	33	36	37	37	38	38	38	41	42	45	48	48	51	54	57	60

Updated to match(es) played on 15 June 2026. Source:
A = Away; H = Home; W = Win; D = Draw; L = Loss; P = Postponed

===== Matches =====
On 26 June, the League One fixtures were released, with Blackpool hosting Stevenage on the opening weekend.

Win Draw Loss Fixtures

2 August 2025 1	Blackpool	2–3	Stevenage	Blackpool
15:00 BST	Honeyman 6'; Ennis 79'	Report	Reid 17', 45+10' (pen.); Kemp 50'	Stadium: Bloomfield Road; Attendance: 10,090; Referee: Matthew Corlett

9 August 2025 2	Exeter City	4–1	Blackpool	Exeter
15:00 BST	Cole 4'; Fitzwater 15'; Wareham 60'; Cox 90'	Report	Fletcher 22'	Stadium: St James Park; Attendance: 6,852; Referee: Carl Brook

16 August 2025 3	Blackpool	3–2	Huddersfield Town	Blackpool
15:00 BST	Ennis 13', 25'; Evans 18'	Report	Wiles 4'; Gooch 31'	Stadium: Bloomfield Road; Attendance: 10,922; Referee: Elliot Bell

19 August 2025 4	Mansfield Town	2–0	Blackpool	Mansfield
19:45 BST	Evans (penalty missed) 45+3'; McDonnell 47', 55'	Report		Stadium: Field Mill; Attendance: 7,574; Referee: Ben Toner

23 August 2025 5	Plymouth Argyle	1–0	Blackpool	Plymouth
15:00 BST	Boateng 48'	Report		Stadium: Home Park; Attendance: 15,322; Referee: David Rock

30 August 2025 6	Blackpool	1–1	Bolton Wanderers	Blackpool
15:00 BST	Sharman-Lowe 13' (o.g.)	Report	Burstow 61'	Stadium: Bloomfield Road; Attendance: 11,579; Referee: Tom Nield

13 September 2025 8	Northampton Town	1–0	Blackpool	Sixfields
12:30 BST		Report		Stadium: Sixfields Stadium
Note: Fixture was originally scheduled for a 15:00 kick-off, but was moved for live Sky Sports broadcasting.

20 September 2025 9	Blackpool	1–0	Barnsley	Blackpool
12:30 BST	Brown 90+8'	Report		Stadium: Bloomfield Road; Referee: Martin Coy
Note: Fixture was originally scheduled for a 15:00 kick-off, but was moved for live Sky Sports broadcasting.

27 September 2025 10	Bradford City	1–0	Blackpool	Bradford
15:00 BST	Neufville 51'	Report		Stadium: Valley Parade; Attendance: 21,531; Referee: Ben Atkinson

30 September 2025 7	Blackpool	2–2	Luton Town	Blackpool
19:45 BST	Hamilton 9', 53'	Report	Clark 78'; Kodua 90+1' (pen.)	Stadium: Bloomfield Road; Attendance: 8,530; Referee: Martin Woods
Note: Fixture was originally scheduled for 6 September, but was postponed due to international call-ups in the Luton squad.

4 October 2025 11	Blackpool	0–2	AFC Wimbledon	Blackpool
15:00 BST		Report	Orsi 38' (pen.), 63'	Stadium: Bloomfield Road; Attendance: 8,906; Referee: Benjamin Speedie

11 October 2025 12	Stockport County	1–0	Blackpool	Stockport
15:00 BST	Olowu 63'	Report		Stadium: Edgeley Park; Attendance: 10,091; Referee: Jacob Miles

18 October 2025 13	Blackpool	1–1	Wycombe Wanderers	Blackpool
15:00 BST		Report		Stadium: Bloomfield Road; Attendance: 8,876

25 October 2025 14	Peterborough United	1–2	Blackpool	Peterborough
15:00 BST		Report		Stadium: London Road Stadium; Attendance: 8,315; Referee: Sam Mulhall

8 November 2025 15	Blackpool	3–1	Cardiff City	Blackpool
15:00 GMT		Report		Stadium: Bloomfield Road; Attendance: 10,792

15 November 2025 16	Burton Albion	1–0	Blackpool	Burton upon Trent
15:00 GMT		Report		Stadium: Pirelli Stadium; Attendance: 4,054

22 November 2025 17	Leyton Orient	1–1	Blackpool	Leyton
15:00 GMT		Report		Stadium: Brisbane Road; Attendance: 8,181

29 November 2025 18	Blackpool	0–3	Reading	Blackpool
12:30 GMT		Report		Stadium: Bloomfield Road; Attendance: 9,272
Note: Fixture was originally scheduled for a 15:00 kick-off, but was rescheduled for live Sky Sports broadcasting.

10 December 2025 19	Rotherham United	0–3	Blackpool	Rotherham
19:45 GMT		Report		Stadium: New York Stadium; Attendance: 7,367
Note: Fixture was initially scheduled for 9 December, but was rescheduled due to Blackpool being involved in the FA Cup on 7 December.

13 December 2025 20	Blackpool	2–2	Lincoln City	Blackpool
15:00 GMT		Report		Stadium: Bloomfield Road; Attendance: 9,227

20 December 2025 21	Wigan Athletic	0–2	Blackpool	Wigan
12:30 GMT		Report		Stadium: The Brick Community Stadium

26 December 2025 22	Blackpool	1–0	Doncaster Rovers	Blackpool
15:00 GMT		Report		Stadium: Bloomfield Road

29 December 2025 23	Blackpool	4–0	Rotherham United	Blackpool
19:45 GMT		Report		Stadium: Bloomfield Road

1 January 2026 24	Port Vale	5–1	Blackpool	Stoke-on-Trent
15:00 GMT		Report		Stadium: Vale Park; Attendance: 7,541; Referee: Edward Duckworth

4 January 2026 25	Blackpool	1–2	Bradford City	Blackpool
15:00 GMT		Report		Stadium: Bloomfield Road; Attendance: 10,894

17 January 2026 27	Barnsley	2–1	Blackpool	Barnsley
15:00 GMT		Report		Stadium: Oakwell; Attendance: 10,266

24 January 2026 28	Blackpool	2–0	Northampton Town	Blackpool
15:00 GMT		Report		Stadium: Bloomfield Road; Attendance: 10,099

27 January 2026 29	Blackpool	1–2	Stockport County	Blackpool
19:45 GMT		Report		Stadium: Bloomfield Road

31 January 2026 30	Luton Town	1–0	Blackpool	Luton
15:00 GMT	Clark 71'	Report		Stadium: Kenilworth Road; Attendance: 10,697; Referee: Martin Woods

7 February 2026 31	Huddersfield Town	2–2	Blackpool	Huddersfield
15:00 GMT		Report		Stadium: Kirklees Stadium

14 February 2026 32	Blackpool	0–4	Plymouth Argyle	Blackpool
15:00 GMT	Fletcher (yellow card) 11'; Husband (red card) 87'	Report	Dale (yellow card) 21'; Mitchell 30'; Pepple 45+1'; Boateng 45+4'; Watts 60'; Wiredu (yellow card) 67'; Amaechi (yellow card) 87'	Stadium: Bloomfield Road; Attendance: 9,858; Referee: Paul Howard

17 February 2026 33	Blackpool	1–0	Mansfield Town	Blackpool
20:00 GMT	Ennis 34'; Brown (yellow card) 41'; Walters (yellow card) 41'; Peacock-Farrell (yellow card) 67'; Casey (yellow card) 85'; Anderson (yellow card) 89'	Report		Stadium: Bloomfield Road; Attendance: 8,905; Referee: Andrew Kitchen
Note: Fixture was initially scheduled for a 19:45 kick-off, but was rescheduled for live Sky Sports broadcasting.

21 February 2026 34	Bolton Wanderers	2–2	Blackpool	Horwich
15:00 GMT	Toal 66'; Burstow 85'; Gale (yellow card) 90'	Report	Horsfall (yellow card) 18'; Coulson 73'; Honeyman 77'; Walters (yellow card) 81'; Bowler (yellow card) 90+6'	Stadium: Toughsheet Community Stadium; Attendance: 23,172; Referee: Richard Eley

28 February 2026 35	Lincoln City	4–0	Blackpool	Lincoln
15:00 GMT	McGrandles 38'; Darikwa (yellow card) 51'; Street 78'; Jefferies 85'; Oné 89'	Report	Bowler (yellow card) 23'; Bloxham (yellow card) 36'; Honeyman (yellow card) 85'; Ashworth (yellow card) 90+3'	Stadium: Sincil Bank; Attendance: 9,812; Referee: Bobby Madley

7 March 2026 36	Blackpool	1–1	Wigan Athletic	Blackpool
15:00 GMT	Casey 4'; Anderson (yellow card) 65'; Ihiekwe (yellow card) 67'	Report	Moxon 39'; Murray (yellow card) 60'	Stadium: Bloomfield Road; Attendance: 11,210; Referee: Matthew Russell

11 March 2026 26	AFC Wimbledon	4–1	Blackpool	Wimbledon
19:45 GMT	Johnson 11'; Stevens 54' (pen.); Nelson 90+4'; Bugiel 90+7'	Report	Ennis 63'	Stadium: Plough Lane; Attendance: 7,535; Referee: Lee Swabey
Note: Fixture was initially scheduled for 10 January, but was rearranged due to FA Cup progression.

14 March 2026 37	Doncaster Rovers	2–1	Blackpool	Doncaster
15:00 GMT	Bailey 29'; Adelakun 83'	Report	Anderson (yellow card) 42'; Ennis (yellow card) 60'; Bowler (yellow card) 63'; Horsfall (yellow card) 74' (yellow-red card) 89'; Fletcher 88'	Stadium: Eco-Power Stadium; Attendance: 8,662; Referee: Carl Brook

17 March 2026 38	Blackpool	3–2	Port Vale	Blackpool
19:45 GMT	Ennis 46'; Fletcher 72'; Walters 81'	Report	Brown 2'; Walters 59'; Sherif (yellow card) 74'; Gordon (yellow card) 76'; Magloire (yellow card) 90+5'	Stadium: Bloomfield Road; Attendance: 8,567; Referee: Will Finnie

21 March 2026 39	Cardiff City	0–0	Blackpool	Leckwith
12:30 GMT	Ng (yellow card) 35'; Fish (yellow card) 81'	Report	Bowler (yellow card) 64'; Peacock-Farrell (yellow card) 85'; Walters (yellow card) 90'	Stadium: Cardiff City Stadium; Attendance: 18,026; Referee: Stephen Parkinson
Note: Fixture was initially scheduled for a 15:00 kick-off, but was brought forward for Sky Sports broadcasting.

28 March 2026 40	Blackpool	1–0	Burton Albion	Blackpool
15:00 GMT	Brown (yellow card) 15'; Fletcher (yellow card) 56'; Horsfall (yellow card) 64'; Hamilton 90+1'; Clarkson (yellow card) 90+6'; Honeyman (yellow card) 90+7'	Report	Hartridge (yellow card) 22'; Chauke (yellow card) 68'; Lofthouse (yellow card) 90+8'	Stadium: Bloomfield Road; Attendance: 11,106; Referee: Martin Coy

3 April 2026 41	Blackpool	1–0	Exeter City	Blackpool
15:00 GMT	Bloxham 29'; Honeyman (yellow card) 72'	Report	Niskanen (yellow card) 80'	Stadium: Bloomfield Road; Attendance: 10,950; Referee: Neil Hair

6 April 2026 42	Stevenage	1–0	Blackpool	Stevenage
15:00 BST	White 66'; Piergianni (yellow card) 86'	Report	Bloxham (yellow card) 87'; Husband (yellow card) 89'	Stadium: Broadhall Way; Attendance: 4,348 (439 away); Referee: David Rock

11 April 2026 43	Blackpool	3–1	Peterborough United	Blackpool
15:00 BST	Taylor 3', 82'; Bloxham 49'; Horsfall (red card) 83'; Walters (yellow card) 90+20'	Report	Khela 24'; Collins (yellow card) 86'; Hayes (yellow card) 90+21'	Stadium: Bloomfield Road; Attendance: 9,555; Referee: Charles Breakspear

18 April 2026 44	Wycombe Wanderers	0–1	Blackpool	High Wycombe
15:00 BST	Woodrow (yellow card) 10'; Skura (yellow card) 61'	Report	Casey (yellow card) 31'; Leahy 48' (o.g.); Coulson (yellow card) 60' (yellow-red card) 70'; Husband (yellow card) 86'	Stadium: Adams Park; Referee: Andrew Humphries

25 April 2026 45	Blackpool	1–0	Leyton Orient	Blackpool
15:00 BST	Dennis 22' (o.g.); Casey (yellow card) 45'	Report	Morris (yellow card) 45+1'; Clare (yellow card) 58'; Forrester (yellow card) 90+2'	Stadium: Bloomfield Road; Attendance: 10,735; Referee: Darren Drysdale

2 May 2026 46	Reading	0–1	Blackpool	Reading
15:00 BST		Report	Hamilton 75'; Casey (yellow card) 81'	Stadium: Madejski Stadium; Attendance: 12,602; Referee: Elliot Bell

=== FA Cup ===
Blackpool were drawn at home to Scunthorpe United in the first round, to Carlisle United in the second round and away to Ipswich Town in the third round.

Win Draw Loss Fixtures

1 November 2025 First round	Blackpool	1–0	Scunthorpe United	Blackpool
15:00 GMT		Report		Stadium: Bloomfield Road; Attendance: 4,503; Referee: Elliot Bell

7 December 2025 Second round	Blackpool	4–1	Carlisle United	Blackpool
17:30 GMT	Bloxham 14'; Fletcher 34', 57'; Banks 38'	Report	Armstrong 51'	Stadium: Bloomfield Road; Attendance: 5,958; Referee: Tom Reeves

10 January 2026 Third round	Ipswich Town	2–1	Blackpool	Ipswich
15:00 GMT		Report		Stadium: Portman Road; Attendance: 27,527

=== EFL Cup ===
Win Draw Loss Fixtures

12 August 2025 1	Blackpool	0–1	Port Vale	Blackpool
19:40 BST		Report	Faal 75'	Stadium: Bloomfield Road; Attendance: 2,606; Referee: Simon Mather

=== EFL Trophy ===
Blackpool were drawn against Barrow, Tranmere Rovers and Nottingham Forest U21 in the group stage. After finishing second in the group, they were then drawn away to Harrogate Town in the round of 32.

Pos	Div	Team	Pld	W	PW	PL	L	GF	GA	GD	Pts	Qualification
1	L2	Tranmere Rovers	3	2	1	0	0	6	4	+2	8	Advance to Round 2
2	L1	Blackpool	3	2	0	0	1	8	3	+5	6	Advance to Round 2
3	L2	Barrow	3	1	0	0	2	3	7	−4	3	
4	ACA	Nottingham Forest U21	3	0	0	1	2	3	6	−3	1	

Source: EFL

Win Draw Loss Fixtures

16 September 2025 North Group B	Blackpool	5–0	Barrow	Blackpool
19:00 BST		Report		Stadium: Bloomfield Road

14 October 2025 North Group B	Blackpool	2–1	Nottingham Forest U21	Blackpool
19:00 BST		Report		Stadium: Bloomfield Road; Attendance: 960; Referee: Peter Wright

11 November 2025 North Group B	Tranmere Rovers	2–1	Blackpool	Birkenhead
19:00 GMT	Brough 24'; Ironside 75'	Report	Banks 18'	Stadium: Prenton Park; Referee: Declan Brown

2 December 2025 Round of 32	Harrogate Town	4–2	Blackpool	Harrogate
19:00 GMT	Smith 7'; O'Connor 13'; Muldoon 17', 84'	Report	Hansson 45'; Fletcher 73'	Stadium: Wetherby Road; Attendance: 1,372; Referee: Wayne Cartmel

== Transfers ==
=== In ===
Date	Pos.	Player	From	Fee	Ref.
25 June 2025	CF	Niall Ennis (ENG)	Stoke City (ENG)	Undisclosed	
1 July 2025 (Note: The transfer was announced on 3 June, and would become official on 1 July once his contract at Stockport had expired)	CB	Fraser Horsfall (ENG)	Stockport County (ENG)	Free	
1 July 2025 (Note: The transfer was announced on 4 June, and would become official on 1 July once his contract at Sheffield Wednesday had expired)	CB	Michael Ihiekwe (ENG)	Sheffield Wednesday (ENG)	Free	
1 July 2025 (Note: The transfer was announced on 24 June, and would become official on 1 July once his contract at Millwall had expired)	CM	George Honeyman (ENG)	Millwall (ENG)	Free	
1 July 2025 (Note: The transfer was announced on 27 June, and would become official on 1 July once his contract at Wycombe Wanderers had expired)	GK	Franco Ravizzoli (ARG)	Wycombe Wanderers (ENG)	Free	
8 July 2025	CDM	Jordan Brown (ENG)	Leyton Orient (ENG)	Undisclosed	
5 August 2025	RW	Malcolm Ebiowei (ENG)	Crystal Palace (ENG)	Undisclosed	
7 August 2025	CF	Dale Taylor (NIR)	Nottingham Forest (ENG)	Undisclosed	
1 September 2025	RW	Josh Bowler (ENG)	Nottingham Forest (ENG)	Free	
30 January 2026	GK	Bailey Peacock-Farrell (NIR)	Birmingham City (ENG)	Undisclosed	
2 February 2026	CM	Leighton Clarkson (ENG)	Aberdeen (SCO)	Undisclosed	

=== Out ===
Date	Pos.	Player	To	Fee	Ref.
25 June 2025	CF	Jake Beesley (ENG)	Burton Albion (ENG)	Undisclosed	
25 June 2025	CB	Matthew Pennington (ENG)	Bradford City (ENG)	Undisclosed	
17 July 2025	RW	Rob Apter (SCO)	Charlton Athletic (ENG)	Undisclosed	
25 July 2025	CM	Josh Miles (ENG)	Waterford (IRL)	Undisclosed	
2 February 2026	CM	Lee Evans (WAL)	Bradford City (ENG)	Undisclosed	

=== Loaned in ===
Date	Pos.	Player	From	Until	Ref.
15 July 2025	RB	Danny Imray (ENG)	Crystal Palace (ENG)	16 January 2026 (Note: On 16 January, Imray was recalled back to Crystal Palace from his initial season-long loan)	
18 July 2025	GK	Bailey Peacock-Farrell (NIR)	Birmingham City (ENG)	30 January 2026 (Note: On 30 January, Peacock-Farrell joined on a permanent basis)	
1 August 2025	LW	Emil Hansson (SWE)	Birmingham City (ENG)	5 January 2026 (Note: On 5 January, Hansson was recalled back from his season-long to Birmingham)	
1 September 2025	RW	Scott Banks (SCO)	FC St. Pauli (GER)	26 January 2026 (Note: On 26 January, Banks was recalled back to St Pauli from his initial season-long loan)	
14 January 2026	CB	Kamarl Grant (ENG)	Millwall (ENG)	31 May 2026	
19 January 2026	CAM	Joel Randall (ENG)	Bolton Wanderers (ENG)	31 May 2026	
21 January 2026	CF	Michael Obafemi (IRL)	Burnley (ENG)	31 May 2026	
2 February 2026	CM	Karoy Anderson (JAM)	Charlton Athletic (ENG)	31 May 2026	
2 February 2026	RB	Reuell Walters (ENG)	Luton Town (ENG)	31 May 2026	

=== Loaned out ===
Date	Pos.	Player	To	Until	Ref.
8 August 2025	CB	Dan Sassi (ENG)	Altrincham (ENG)	31 May 2026 (Note: On 15 January, Sassi's loan at Altrincham was extended until the end of the season)	
18 August 2025	CM	Ryan Finnigan (ENG)	Walsall (ENG)	5 January 2026 (Note: On 5 January, Finnigan was recalled from his loan at Walsall)	
18 August 2025	CF	Kylian Kouassi (ENG)	Cambridge United (ENG)	31 May 2026	
13 September 2025	GK	Harvey Bardsley (ENG)	Runcorn Linnets (ENG)	11 October 2025	
19 September 2025	CF	Terry Bondo (ENG)	Marine (ENG)	24 October 2025 (Note: On 24 October, Bondo was recalled from his loan at Marine)	
20 January 2026	CB	Oluchukwu Nwankwo (ENG)	Bamber Bridge (ENG)	20 February 2026	
23 January 2026	CF	Billy Whaite (ENG)	Bradford (Park Avenue) (ENG)	31 May 2026 (Note: On 28 February, Whaite's loan at Bradford (Park Avenue) was extended until the end of the season)	
7 February 2026	CF	Terry Bondo (ENG)	King's Lynn Town (ENG)	31 May 2026 (Note: On 10 March, Bondo's loan at King's Lynn Town was extended until the end of the season)	
7 February 2026	CAM	Spencer Knight (ENG)	Bamber Bridge (ENG)	7 March 2026	
13 February 2026	GK	Harvey Bardsley (ENG)	Trafford (ENG)	14 March 2026	
13 February 2026	CAM	Theo Upton (ENG)	Matlock Town (ENG)	31 May 2026 (Note: On 10 March, Upton's loan at Matlock Town was extended until the end of the season)	
27 February 2026	CF	James Butterworth (ENG)	Trafford (ENG)	31 May 2026 (Note: On 27 March, Butterworth's loan at Trafford was extended until the end of the season)	
24 March 2026	CAM	Spencer Knight (ENG)	Ashton United (ENG)	31 May 2026	
27 March 2026	GK	Charlie Brier (ENG)	Trafford (ENG)	31 May 2026	

=== Released / out of contract ===
Date	Pos.	Player	Subsequent club	Join date	Ref.
30 June 2025	CM	Sonny Carey (ENG)	Charlton Athletic (ENG)	1 July 2025	
30 June 2025	RB	Jordan Lawrence-Gabriel (ENG)	Port Vale (ENG)	1 July 2025	
30 June 2025	CM	Oliver Norburn (GRN)	Notts County (ENG)	1 July 2025	
30 June 2025	GK	Richard O'Donnell (ENG)	Derby County (ENG)	1 July 2025	
30 June 2025	GK	Mackenzie Chapman (ENG)	None by 1 July 2025		
30 June 2025	LW	Jake Daniels (ENG)	None by 1 July 2025		
30 June 2025	RB	Kwaku Donkor (ENG)	None by 1 July 2025		
30 June 2025	CB	Tyler Hill (ENG)	None by 1 July 2025		
30 June 2025	CM	Jaden Jones (ENG)	None by 1 July 2025		
30 June 2025	LB	Alex Lankshear (ENG)	None by 1 July 2025		
30 June 2025	RB	Jack Moore (ENG)	None by 1 July 2025		
30 June 2025	CM	Josh Onomah (ENG)	None by 1 July 2025		
30 June 2025	CF	Jordan Rhodes (SCO)	None by 1 July 2025		

== Statistics ==
=== Appearances and goals ===
Only players with appearances are included in the list; italics indicate a loaned in player

No.	Pos	Nat	Player	Total		League One		FA Cup		EFL Cup		EFL Trophy	
No.	Pos	Nat	Player	Apps	Goals	Apps	Goals	Apps	Goals	Apps	Goals	Apps	Goals
1	GK	(Northern Ireland) NIR	Bailey Peacock-Farrell	46	0	42+0	0	3+0	0	1+0	0	0+0	0
2	DF	(Republic of Ireland) IRL	Andy Lyons	27	1	8+13	0	2+0	0	0+1	0	3+0	1
3	DF	(England) ENG	James Husband	23	0	19+2	0	0+1	0	0+0	0	1+0	0
4	DF	(England) ENG	Oliver Casey	48	1	43+1	1	3+0	0	1+0	0	0+0	0
5	DF	(England) ENG	Fraser Horsfall	30	0	24+1	0	2+0	0	0+0	0	3+0	0
6	MF	(England) ENG	Jordan Brown	52	1	41+4	1	1+2	0	1+0	0	2+1	0
7	MF	(England) ENG	Leighton Clarkson	12	0	8+4	0	0+0	0	0+0	0	0+0	0
8	MF	(England) ENG	Albie Morgan	21	0	15+4	0	1+0	0	0+0	0	0+1	0
9	FW	(England) ENG	Niall Ennis	27	6	12+14	6	0+0	0	0+1	0	0+0	0
10	MF	(England) ENG	George Honeyman	37	2	31+2	2	2+1	0	1+0	0	0+0	0
11	FW	(England) ENG	Ashley Fletcher	50	21	37+6	15	3+0	4	0+1	0	2+1	2
12	DF	(England) ENG	Kamarl Grant	3	0	3+0	0	0+0	0	0+0	0	0+0	0
14	FW	(England) ENG	Tom Bloxham	50	8	27+16	7	3+0	1	1+0	0	3+0	0
15	DF	(England) ENG	Hayden Coulson	38	1	26+7	1	1+1	0	1+0	0	0+2	0
17	MF	(England) ENG	Joel Randall	10	0	4+6	0	0+0	0	0+0	0	0+0	0
18	FW	(England) ENG	Dale Taylor	21	4	12+7	3	0+0	0	1+0	0	0+1	1
19	FW	(England) ENG	Josh Bowler	33	3	20+8	2	1+2	0	0+0	0	1+1	1
20	DF	(England) ENG	Michael Ihiekwe	26	0	25+0	0	0+0	0	1+0	0	0+0	0
21	FW	(Republic of Ireland) IRL	Michael Obafemi	5	0	4+1	0	0+0	0	0+0	0	0+0	0
22	MF	(Republic of Ireland) IRL	CJ Hamilton	50	4	29+14	4	1+2	0	1+0	0	3+0	0
23	MF	(Jamaica) JAM	Karoy Anderson	16	1	11+5	1	0+0	0	0+0	0	0+0	0
24	DF	(England) ENG	Reuell Walters	17	1	15+2	1	0+0	0	0+0	0	0+0	0
25	GK	(Argentina) ARG	Franco Ravizzoli	8	0	4+0	0	0+0	0	0+0	0	4+0	0
26	DF	(Wales) WAL	Zac Ashworth	35	1	16+12	1	3+0	0	0+0	0	4+0	0
28	MF	(England) ENG	Ryan Finnigan	10	0	0+9	0	0+0	0	0+1	0	0+0	0
37	FW	(England) ENG	James Butterworth	1	0	0+0	0	0+0	0	0+0	0	0+1	0
38	MF	(England) ENG	Harry Williamson	1	0	0+0	0	0+0	0	0+0	0	0+1	0
40	MF	(England) ENG	Theo Upton	3	0	0+1	0	0+0	0	0+0	0	2+0	0
41	FW	(England) ENG	Terry Bondo	5	0	0+2	0	0+1	0	0+0	0	1+1	0
42	MF	(England) ENG	Spencer Knight	1	0	0+0	0	0+0	0	0+0	0	1+0	0
44	DF	(England) ENG	George Elder	2	0	0+0	0	0+0	0	0+0	0	0+2	0
45	DF	(Suriname) SUR	Ky-Mani Leliendal	2	0	0+0	0	0+0	0	0+0	0	1+1	0
46	DF	(England) ENG	Oluchukwu Nwankwo	1	0	0+0	0	0+0	0	0+0	0	1+0	0
47	MF	(England) ENG	Jack Richardson	2	0	0+0	0	0+0	0	0+0	0	0+2	0
49	DF	(England) ENG	Derek Oshodi	2	0	0+0	0	0+0	0	0+0	0	1+1	0
Players who featured but departed the club during the season:
7	MF	(Wales) WAL	Lee Evans	31	2	13+11	2	2+1	0	1+0	0	3+0	0
17	MF	(England) ENG	Malcolm Ebiowei	4	0	0+3	0	0+0	0	0+1	0	0+0	0
23	FW	(Scotland) SCO	Scott Banks	20	5	2+12	1	2+1	1	0+0	0	3+0	3
29	MF	(Sweden) SWE	Emil Hansson	24	2	3+14	0	2+0	0	1+0	0	4+0	2
30	DF	(England) ENG	Danny Imray	16	2	12+1	2	1+1	0	0+0	0	0+1	0
