= Tom Bloxham (footballer, born 2003) =

English footballer

Personal information
- Full name: Thomas Stanley Bloxham
- Date of birth: 1 November 2003 (age 23)
- Place of birth: Leicester, England
- Height: 1.96 m (6 ft 5 in)
- Position: Forward

Team information
- Current team: Blackpool
- Number: 14

Youth career
- 2011–2017: Leicester City
- 2017–2018: Aylestone Park
- 2018–2021: Shrewsbury Town

Senior career*
Years	Team	Apps	(Gls)
2021–2025	Shrewsbury Town	106	(8)
2023–2024	→ Morecambe (loan)	24	(0)
2025–	Blackpool	57	(9)
- * Club domestic league appearances and goals as of 23:16, 12 May 2026 (UTC)

Thomas Stanley Bloxham (born 1 November 2003) is an English professional footballer who plays as a forward for Blackpool.

== Early and personal life ==
Bloxham was born in Leicester, England. Growing up, he attended Leysland High School and Oswestry School. He played football for the school whilst attending.

== Career ==
Bloxham is a youth product of Leicester City from the ages of 8 to 14, and had a stint with his local club Aylestone Park before signing with Shrewsbury Town's youth academy. He made his professional debut in a 1–0 EFL League One loss to Lincoln City on 27 April 2021. He scored his first senior goal for the club on 28 August 2021, scoring a 59th-minute equaliser in a 2–1 win at home to Gillingham, the club's first league goal of the season. On 20 July 2023, Bloxham joined League Two side Morecambe on a season-long loan deal. In January 2025, Bloxham joined League One side Blackpool for an undisclosed fee, signing a three-and-a-half year deal.

== Career statistics ==
As of end of 2025–26 season

Appearances and goals by club, season and competition
Club	Season	League			FA Cup		League Cup		Other		Total	
Club	Season	Division	Apps	Goals	Apps	Goals	Apps	Goals	Apps	Goals	Apps	Goals
Shrewsbury Town	2020–21	League One	4	0	0	0	0	0	1 (Note: Appearance(s) in the EFL Trophy)	0	5	0
Shrewsbury Town	2021–22	League One	34	2	3	2	2	0	2	1	41	5
Shrewsbury Town	2022–23	League One	28	0	2	0	2	0	3	0	35	0
Shrewsbury Town	2023–24	League One	18	2	0	0	0	0	0	0	18	2
Shrewsbury Town	2024–25	League One	22	4	1	0	2	0	2	0	27	4
Shrewsbury Town	Total		106	8	6	2	6	0	8	1	126	11
Morecambe (loan)	2023–24	League Two	24	0	3	2	1	0	3	0	31	2
Blackpool	2024–25	League One	14	2	—		—		—		14	2
Blackpool	2025–26	League One	43	7	3	1	1	0	3	0	50	8
Blackpool	Total		57	9	3	1	1	0	3	0	64	10
Career total			187	17	12	5	8	0	14	1	221	23
