= 2024–25 Blackpool F.C. season =

English football club season

Blackpool F.C.
2024–25 season
- Owner: Simon Sadler
- Head coach: Neil Critchley (until 21 August); Richard Keogh (interim) (from 21 August to 3 September); Steve Bruce (from 3 September)
- Stadium: Bloomfield Road
- League One: 9th
- FA Cup: Second round
- EFL Cup: Third round
- EFL Trophy: Knockout stage
- Top goalscorer: League: Ashley Fletcher; Sonny Carey (11 each); All: Ashley Fletcher; Sonny Carey (11 each)
- Average home league attendance: 9,623
Home colours	Away colours	Third colours

The 2024–25 season was the 116th season in the history of Blackpool Football Club, and their second-consecutive season in League One, the third tier of English professional football. They finished in 9th place, with 67 points from a possible 138. They also participated in three cup competitions: they were knocked out of the FA Cup in the second round, of the EFL Cup in the third round and of the EFL Trophy in the knockout stage.

The club was managed by Neil Critchley, in his second season of his second spell at the club, until 21 August, when he was sacked. Richard Keogh replaced him in the interim. Steve Bruce was appointed as the club's new head coach on 3 September.

Sonny Carey and Ashley Fletcher were the club's top scorers, with eleven goals in all competitions.

== Pre-season ==
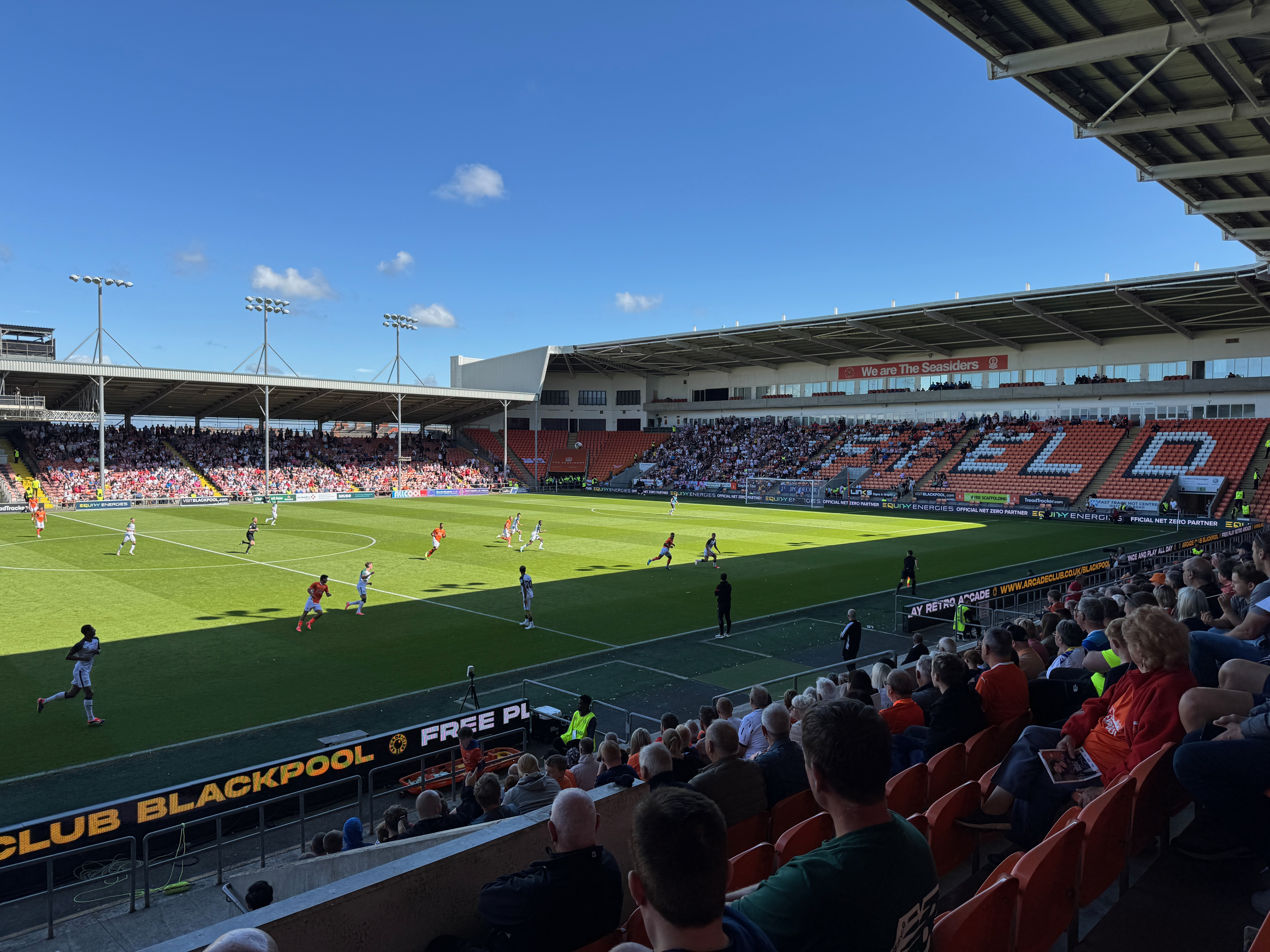
Blackpool hosting Sunderland in a friendly on 27 July

Two new signings occurred in June, to become official on 1 July: Jordan Rhodes, who was on loan at the club the previous season, joined on a free transfer, as did fellow striker Ashley Fletcher. They were followed by defenders Zac Ashworth and Hayden Coulson, the latter of whom was at Blackpool on loan the previous season.

On 8 July, Welsh midfielder Lee Evans joined on a free transfer.

The club's first pre-season friendly took place at AFC Fylde on 12 July. The hosts won 3–1, with Jake Daniels scoring Blackpool's goal.

A week later, Blackpool played Cádiz CF as part of the club's training stint in Spain. The match finished goalless.

Forward Zak Emmerson joined FC Halifax Town on a permanent transfer on 23 July. The fee was not disclosed. Later in the day, Blackpool travelled to West Bromwich Albion. Goals from Sonny Carey and Ashley Fletcher gave Blackpool a 2–1 victory.

On 27 July, Blackpool hosted Sunderland at Bloomfield Road. Josh Clarke's strike for the visitors was the only goal of the game.

Two more defeats followed—at Tranmere and at home to Accrington Stanley—before pre-season was brought to a close with a 2–0 victory at Neil Critchley's former club, Crewe Alexandra.

On 5 August, defender Elkan Baggott joined on a season-long loan from Ipswich Town. Three days later, Elliot Embleton, previously on loan at Blackpool, was signed on a permanent basis on a two-year contract. He was sold to Carlisle United on 2 January, having been unable to establish himself in the team.

=== Results ===
On 17 May, Blackpool announced their first four pre-season matches, against AFC Fylde, Sunderland, Tranmere Rovers and Crewe Alexandra.

Win Draw Loss Fixtures

12 July 2024 Friendly	AFC Fylde	3–1	Blackpool	Medlar-with-Wesham
19:00 BST	Ustabasi 11'; Long 20'; Haughton 58' (pen.)	Report	Daniels 9'	Stadium: Mill Farm Sports Village

19 July 2024 Friendly	Cádiz CF	0–0	Blackpool	Benalup-Casas Viejas
18:00 BST		Report		Stadium: Fairplay Golf & Spa Resort

23 July 2024 Friendly	West Bromwich Albion	1–2	Blackpool	Walsall
13:00 BST		Report	Carey 2'; Fletcher 80'	Stadium: West Bromwich Albion training ground Attendance: 0 (Behind-closed-doors)

27 July 2024 Friendly	Blackpool	0–1	Sunderland	Blackpool
15:00 BST		Report	Clarke	Stadium: Bloomfield Road

30 July 2024 Friendly	Tranmere Rovers	3–1	Blackpool	Birkenhead
19:45 BST	Norris 21'; Hendry 25'; Trialist 89'	Report	Rhodes 86' (pen.)	Stadium: Prenton Park

30 July 2024 Friendly	Blackpool	1–3	Accrington Stanley	Blackpool
13:00 BST	Fletcher 74'	Report	Mooney 32'; Woods 43', 75'	Stadium: Bloomfield Road; Attendance: 0 (Behind-closed-doors)

3 August 2024 Friendly	Crewe Alexandra	0–2	Blackpool	Crewe
15:00 BST		Report	Joseph 1'; Rhodes 39'	Stadium: Gresty Road

== Season proper ==
=== August ===
Blackpool began their League One campaign with a 2–1 defeat at Crawley Town on 10 August. Ashley Fletcher scored on his debut for the visitors in the 74th minute, having come on as a substitute two minutes earlier.

Three days later, Blackpool reached the second round of the EFL Cup with a 4–0 victory at Burton Albion. Ryan Finnigan (on his debut), Matthew Pennington (2) and Lee Evans (first for the club) got the goals, each in the second half. Earlier in the day, striker Dom Ballard joined on loan from Southampton. He was recalled to the south coast on 3 January.

A second-successive League One defeat followed at home (3–0 to Stockport County) on 17 August. Blackpool dropped to second-bottom in the table. Neil Critchley was sacked four days later, with Richard Keogh replacing him in the interim.

After three years at Bloomfield Road, goalkeeper Daniel Grimshaw joined Plymouth Argyle for an undisclosed fee on 23 August. The following day, Blackpool drew 4–4 at Cambridge United, despite leading 4–1. James Husband scored twice, with the other goals coming from Kyle Joseph and Dom Ballard, his first goal for the club. Blackpool climbed one place to 22nd with the point.

On 27 August, Blackpool reached the third round of the EFL Cup, after a 2–1 victory over Blackburn Rovers at Ewood Park. Jake Beesley and Hayden Coulson scored the visitors' goals. It was Blackpool's first appearance in the third round since the 2018–19 season. Earlier in the day, 22-year-old goalkeeper Harry Tyrer joined on a season-long loan from Everton.

On 30 August, transfer deadline day, forward Kylian Kouassi joined League Two Salford City on loan until the end of the season. Right-back Odeluga Offiah arrived at Bloomfield Road on loan from Brighton for the rest of the season.

Blackpool drew 2–2 with Wycombe Wanderers at Bloomfield Road on 31 August. The hosts' goals came from Kyle Joseph and Jake Beesley. They climbed one place to 21st with the point.

=== September ===
On 3 September, Blackpool beat Crewe Alexandra 4–1 at Bloomfield Road in the group stage of the EFL Trophy, maintaining Richard Keogh's unbeaten start as interim manager. Jordan Rhodes, Sonny Carey and CJ Hamilton (2) got Blackpool's goals. Immediately after the match, Steve Bruce was announced as Blackpool's new head coach.

Blackpool beat Exeter City 2–1 at Bloomfield Road on 14 September, after a 94th-minute winner by James Husband, in Steve Bruce's first game in charge. CJ Hamilton scored Blackpool's first goal. The hosts climbed to 19th in the table with the three points.

Sheffield Wednesday, with a single-goal victory, knocked Blackpool out of the EFL Cup at the third-round stage on 17 September.

On 20 September, young striker Jake Daniels was loaned to Warrington Rylands for a month. The following day, Blackpool travelled to Charlton Athletic, and returned north with all three points in a 2–1 victory. An own-goal from the hosts was followed by Albie Morgan's first goal of the campaign. The visitors climbed to 13th with the victory.

Blackpool visited Huddersfield Town on 24 September, and returned with a 2–0 victory. Kyle Joseph, with his third league goal of the campaign, put the visitors ahead on 31 minutes. CJ Hamilton doubled their advantage five minutes into first-half injury time, scoring his fourth goal of the season. Blackpool climbed four places to 9th with the three points.

On 28 September, Blackpool hosted Burton Albion in a League One fixture. They won 3–0, with goals from Odeluga Offiah (his first for the club), Lee Evans and Rob Apter (also his first for the club). Blackpool climbed five places to fourth with the three points, their fourth-consecutive league victory. Steve Bruce won the EFL League One Manager of the Month award for September off the back of the wins.

=== October ===
Blackpool made it seven league games unbeaten on 1 October with a 1–1 draw with Lincoln City at Bloomfield Road. Kyle Joseph got Blackpool's goal sixteen minutes from time, his fourth goal of the campaign; Lincoln equalised four minutes into injury time. Blackpool slipped two places to sixth with the point.

Midfielder Josh Onomah joined on a free transfer on 3 October. A defeat, the club's first under Steve Bruce, followed at Mansfield Town two days later. 2–0 was the scoreline. Blackpool dropped four places to tenth.

After a two-week break Blackpool lost 2–1 at home to Barnsley; Oliver Casey got Blackpool's goal, an equaliser, but the visitors scored the winner in injury time. Blackpool dropped another four places to 14th with the defeat. A minute's applause took place in the fourth minute of the game in memory of the four-year-old grandson of Steve Bruce who died the previous day. Bruce was absent for the fixture.

On 22 October, Blackpool lost a third game in succession, this time 5–1 at Peterborough United. Kyle Joseph scored Blackpool's goal, making him the club's leading goal scorer in all competitions. Steve Bruce was again absent from the game. Blackpool dropped two places to 16th with the defeat.

Six days later, Blackpool drew 2–2 with Wigan Athletic at Bloomfield Road, having gone two goals behind. Both of the hosts' goals were own-goals by Wigan players.

=== November ===
On 2 November, with Steve Bruce back in the dugout, Blackpool reached the second round of the FA Cup after a 2–0 victory at Gillingham, one of Bruce's former clubs. Sonny Carey scored both goals.

Blackpool's winless streak stretched to six league games on 9 November, after a 3–0 defeat to Leyton Orient at Brisbane Road. They dropped two places to 18th.

On 12 November, Blackpool travelled to Harrogate Town in the EFL Trophy. The visitors came from two goals down to draw 2–2, with Jordan Rhodes and Ryan Finnigan. They won the subsequent penalty shootout 5–4, winning a bonus point.

Blackpool made it eight league games without a win after losing 2–1 at Bolton Wanderers on 23 November. Kyle Joseph scored the visitors' goal, his sixth of the season. Blackpool dropped one place to 19th.

A victory followed at Bristol Rovers on 26 November, with goals by Dom Ballard and Lee Evans (penalty). Blackpool climbed three places to 16th with the three points.

=== December ===
On 1 December, Blackpool exited the FA Cup after a second-round defeat to Birmingham City at Bloomfield Road.

Blackpool travelled to Shrewsbury Town on 4 December, and returned with all three points. The goals came from an own-goal from the hosts and Josh Onomah, his first for the club. The visitors climbed two places to 12th with the victory.

Ten days later, Blackpool made it three consecutive league victories after taking all three points at Reading, with goals from Albie Morgan, Ashley Fletcher and Rob Apter. Blackpool climbed two places to tenth with the win.

A goalless draw at home to Stevenage followed on 21 December, then a 2–1 Boxing Day defeat at Wrexham.

On 29 December, Blackpool held table-topping Birmingham to a goalless draw at St. Andrew's. The Tangerines dropped to 15th place in the table with the point.

=== January ===
Blackpool rang in 2025 with a 1–1 draw at home to Shrewsbury Town. Rob Apter scored the hosts' goal. They remained 15th.

Another draw followed at Wycombe Wanderers on 4 January. Kyle Joseph equalised for Blackpool in injury time, his seventh goal of the campaign. The point kept the Tangerines in 15th place.

On 13 January, Australian left winger Samuel Silvera joined on loan from Middlesbrough until the end of the season. The following day, Tom Bloxham joined the club, for an undisclosed fee, from Shrewsbury Town.

Around this time, a slew of loan departures occurred: Jack Moore to Chorley, Zac Ashworth to Ross County, Dan Sassi to AFC Fylde, Oliver Norburn to Wigan Athletic, Josh Miles to FC United of Manchester, Kwaku Donkor to Mickleover and Jordan Rhodes to Mansfield Town.

On 18 January, after a two-week break due to a postponement, Blackpool drew for a fourth-consecutive match, this time at home to Huddersfield Town. Blackpool went two goals up, through Rob Apter and Albie Morgan, but the visitors scored twice early in the second half. Blackpool climbed one place to 14th.

On 20 January, Kyle Joseph joined Hull City, also for an undisclosed fee.

After a month-and-a-half without a league victory, Blackpool secured all three points at Exeter City on 25 January. Their goals, all scored in the first half, came from CJ Hamilton, Tom Bloxham (with a debut goal) and Ashley Fletcher. Blackpool remained 14th. They followed this up three days later with another victory, this time at Lincoln City. Ashley Fletcher and Oliver Casey got the goals for the visitors, who climbed one place to 13th.

On 30 January, forward Niall Ennis joined on loan from Stoke City until the end of the season.

=== February ===
On 1 February, Blackpool recovered from being two goals down at home to Charlton Athletic to draw 2–2, with goals from new signings Samuel Silvera and Niall Ennis. Both had come on as second-half substitutes. Blackpool remained 13th with the point. Their unbeaten run stretched to seven league games.

Blackpool drew 1–1 at Burton Albion on 8 February. Albie Morgan scored the visitors' equaliser in stoppage time. They remained 13th with the point.

Another 1–1 followed, this time at home to Rotherham on 11 February. Blackpool climbed two places to 11th with the point.

Blackpool made it nine draws in their last twelve games with a 3–3 scoreline at home to Mansfield Town on 15 February. The hosts' goals came from Sonny Carey, Ashley Fletcher (his sixth of the campaign) and Niall Ennis. They remained in 11th.

On 22 February, Blackpool won their first home game since 28 September with a 3–1 result at home to Crawley Town, despite playing over half of the match with ten men. Niall Ennis scored twice in the first half, and Lee Evans converted a penalty in the second half. Ashley Fletcher was the player dismissed, on 32 minutes. Blackpool remained in 11th place in the table.

=== March ===
On 1 March, Blackpool suffered their first defeat since Boxing Day after a 2–1 scoreline at Stockport County. Ashley Fletcher scored the visitors' goal. It was his seventh goal of the season and meant he became the club's joint-top scorer alongside the now-departed Kyle Joseph. Blackpool remained 11th, eight points behind Barnsley but with a game in hand.

A goalless draw followed at home to Peterborough United on 4 March, Blackpool's tenth draw in their last fifteen league games. They dropped two places to 13th with the point.

On 8 March, Blackpool beat Barnsley 3–0 at Oakwell, with Sonny Carey (2) and Ashley Fletcher scoring. Fletcher became the club's top scorer with eight. Blackpool climbed two places to 11th.

Three days later, Blackpool made it three wins out of five with a 2–1 scoreline at home to Cambridge United. Ashley Fletcher and Sonny Carey (three goals in two games) were on the scoresheet for the hosts. Blackpool remained in 11th place.

Blackpool lost at home to Leyton Orient on 15 March. Sonny Carey scored his eighth goal of the season, in the process becoming the club's second-highest scorer behind Ashley Fletcher. They remained 11th.

Blackpool climbed to 10th place after a 2–0 victory at Northampton Town on 22 March. Ashley Fletcher scored his tenth goal of the season, with Niall Ennis getting the second.

Blackpool beat Bolton Wanderers 2–1 at Bloomfield Road on 29 March. Ashley Fletcher and Niall Ennis again got the goals. Blackpool remained 10th.

=== April ===
On 1 April, Blackpool made it five wins from six games with a 3–0 scoreline over fellow play-off candidates Reading. Sonny Carey scored two of the goals (bringing his season's tally to 11) and Oliver Casey got the other.

A 2–1 defeat at Rotherham United followed on 5 April. Sonny Carey got Blackpool's goal from the penalty spot and became the club's joint-top scorer alongside Ashley Fletcher. Jake Beesley was dismissed for the Seasiders for a second bookable offence. They dropped one place to 10th.

Blackpool returned to winning ways on 18 April with a 3–1 scoreline at Stevenage. Rob Apter scored each of Blackpool's goals, his first career hat-trick. Blackpool remained 10th.

A defeat followed, 2–1 at home to Wrexham. Rob Apter scored for the hosts, his fourth goal in two games. Blackpool remained 10th, nine points outside the play-off places with nine points left to play for, but had inferior goal-difference to Leyton Orient, the team occupying the final play-off spot.

Blackpool drew 1–1 at Wigan Athletic on 26 April. Lee Evans, with a second-half penalty, levelled for the visitors, who climbed one place to 9th.

=== May ===
In the final match of the season, Blackpool beat Bristol Rovers 4–1, with goals from Tom Bloxham, Albie Morgan, Niall Ennis and Ryan Finnigan. They finished the campaign in 9th place, having picked up 67 points from a possible 138.

On 5 May, the club announced its retained list for the 2025–26 season. A contract extension was exercised on one player:

- Jake Beesley

Twelve players were released:

- Mackenzie Chapman
- Jake Daniels
- Kwaku Donkor
- Jordan Gabriel
- Tyler Hill
- Jaden Jones
- Alex Lankshear
- Jack Moore
- Oliver Norburn
- Richard O’Donnell
- Josh Onomah
- Jordan Rhodes

The club was in discussions with Sonny Carey and Matthew Pennington, while Johnson Opawole was offered a professional contract.

== Competitions ==
=== League One ===
==== League table ====
Pos	Team	Pld	W	D	L	GF	GA	GD	Pts
7	Reading	46	21	12	13	68	57	+11	75
8	Bolton Wanderers	46	20	8	18	67	70	−3	68
9	Blackpool	46	17	16	13	72	60	+12	67
10	Huddersfield Town	46	19	7	20	58	55	+3	64
11	Lincoln City	46	16	13	17	64	56	+8	61

Source: EFL Official Website
Rules for classification: 1) Points; 2) Goal difference; 3) Number of goals scored; 4) Head-to-head results; 5) Wins; 6) Away goals; 7) Penalty points (sec 9.5); 8) 12-point sending off offences

==== Results summary ====
Overall								Home						Away					
Pld	W	D	L	GF	GA	GD	Pts	W	D	L	GF	GA	GD	W	D	L	GF	GA	GD
46	17	16	13	72	60	+12	67	7	11	5	35	29	+6	10	5	8	37	31	+6

Last updated: 30 April 2025.
Source: Soccerway

==== Matches ====
On 26 June, the League One fixtures were announced.

Win Draw Loss Fixtures

10 August 2024 1	Crawley Town	2–1	Blackpool	Crawley
17:30 BST	Hepburn-Murphy 16'; Quitirna 33'	Report	Fletcher 74'	Stadium: Broadfield Stadium; Attendance: 4,718 (754 away); Referee: Sam Purkiss

17 August 2024 2	Blackpool	0–3	Stockport County	Blackpool
15:00 BST		Report	Barry 67'; Fevrier 84'; Olaofe 90+4'	Stadium: Bloomfield Road; Attendance: 12,567; Referee: Simon Mather

24 August 2024 3	Cambridge United	4–4	Blackpool	Cambridge
15:00 BST	Lavery 28', 75'; Andrew 59'; Njoku 72'	Report	Husband 5', 38'; Joseph 39'; Ballard 53'	Stadium: Abbey Stadium; Attendance: 6,083 (477 away); Referee: Jacob Miles

31 August 2024 4	Blackpool	2–2	Wycombe Wanderers	Blackpool
12:30 BST	Joseph 32'; Beesley 84'	Report	McCleary 10'; Udoh 78'	Stadium: Bloomfield Road; Attendance: 9,143; Referee: Darren Drysdale
Note: Fixture was initially scheduled for a 15:00 kick-off, but was moved for live Sky Sports broadcast.

14 September 2024 6	Blackpool	2–1	Exeter City	Blackpool
15:00 BST	Hamilton 19'; Husband 90+4'	Report	Francis 88'	Stadium: Bloomfield Road; Attendance: 8,813; Referee: Ross Joyce

21 September 2024 7	Charlton Athletic	1–2	Blackpool	Charlton
15:00 BST	Berry 90+6'	Report	Ahadme 28' (o.g.); Morgan 32'	Stadium: The Valley; Attendance: 14,149 (675 away); Referee: Charles Breakspear

24 September 2024 5	Huddersfield Town	0–2	Blackpool	Huddersfield
19:45 BST		Report	Joseph 31'; CJ Hamilton 45+6'	Stadium: Kirklees Stadium; Attendance: 17,068 (715 away); Referee: Ben Speedie
Note: Fixture was originally scheduled for 7 September, but was postponed due to international call-ups.

28 September 2024 8	Blackpool	3–0	Burton Albion	Blackpool
15:00 BST		Report		Stadium: Bloomfield Road; Attendance: 9,168; Referee: Geoff Eltringham

1 October 2024 9	Blackpool	1–1	Lincoln City	Blackpool
19:45 BST		Report		Stadium: Bloomfield Road; Attendance: 8,528; Referee: Lewis Smith

5 October 2024 10	Mansfield Town	2–0	Blackpool	Mansfield
15:00 BST		Report		Stadium: One Call Stadium; Attendance: 8,121 (1,294 away)

19 October 2024 12	Blackpool	1–2	Barnsley	Blackpool
15:00 BST		Report		Stadium: Bloomfield Road; Attendance: 10,565; Referee: Paul Howard

22 October 2024 13	Peterborough United	5–1	Blackpool	Peterborough
19:30 BST	Mothersille 8'; Randall 17', 73'; Poku 28'; Offiah 70' (o.g.)	Report	Joseph 27'	Stadium: Weston Homes Stadium; Attendance: 6,391 (235 away); Referee: Declan Bourne

28 October 2024 14	Blackpool	2–2	Wigan Athletic	Blackpool
20:00 GMT	Kerr 45+1' (o.g.); Aimson 90+2' (o.g.)	Report	Smith 41'	Stadium: Bloomfield Road; Attendance: 10,226; Referee: Farai Hallam

9 November 2024 15	Leyton Orient	3–0	Blackpool	Leyton
15:00 GMT		Report		Stadium: Brisbane Road; Attendance: 8,527 (918 away)

16 November 2024 16	Blackpool	0–0	Northampton Town	Blackpool
15:00 GMT		Report		Stadium: Bloomfield Road; Attendance: 8,873; Referee: Alex Chilowicz

23 November 2024 17	Bolton Wanderers	2–1	Blackpool	Horwich
12:30 GMT				Stadium: Toughsheet Community Stadium; Attendance: 22,479
Note: Fixture was initially scheduled for a 15:00 kick-off, but was moved for live Sky Sports broadcast.

16 November 2024 11	Bristol Rovers	0–2	Blackpool	Horfield
19:45 GMT		Report		Stadium: Memorial Stadium; Attendance: 6,342 (167 away)
Note: Fixture was originally scheduled for 12 October, but was postponed due to international call-ups.

4 December 2024 18	Shrewsbury Town	1–2	Blackpool	Shrewsbury
19:45 GMT		Report		Stadium: New Meadow; Attendance: 5,251 (251 away); Referee: Matthew Corlett
Note: Fixture was initially scheduled for 3 December, but was moved due to playing in FA Cup action on the preceding Sunday.

14 December 2024 20	Reading	0–3	Blackpool	Reading
15:00 GMT		Report		Stadium: Madejski Stadium; Attendance: 14,455 (450 away); Referee: Anthony Backhouse

21 December 2024 21	Blackpool	0–0	Stevenage	Blackpool
15:00 GMT		Report		Stadium: Bloomfield Road; Attendance: 8,610; Referee: Martin Woods

26 December 2024 22	Wrexham	2–1	Blackpool	Wrexham
15:00 GMT	Mullin 24'; Fletcher 88'	Report	Fletcher 3'	Stadium: Racecourse Ground; Attendance: 13,313 (1,268 away); Referee: Ruebyn Ricardo

29 December 2024 23	Birmingham City	0–0	Blackpool	Bordesley
15:00 GMT		Report		Stadium: St Andrew's; Attendance: 27,340 (710 away); Referee: Lewis Smith

1 January 2025 24	Blackpool	1–1	Shrewsbury Town	Blackpool
15:00 GMT	Apter 61'	Report	Bloxham 80'	Stadium: Bloomfield Road; Attendance: 9,433; Referee: Adam Herczeg

4 January 2025 25	Wycombe Wanderers	1–1	Blackpool	High Wycombe
15:00 GMT	Kone 40' (pen.)	Report	Joseph 90+3'	Stadium: Adams Park

18 January 2025 27	Blackpool	2–2	Huddersfield Town	Blackpool
12:30 GMT	Apter 11'; Morgan 45+4'	Report	Taylor 47'; Spencer 50'	Stadium: Bloomfield Road; Attendance: 10,410; Referee: Martin Coy
Note: Fixture was initially scheduled for a 15:00 kick-off, but was moved for live Sky Sports broadcasting.

25 January 2025 28	Exeter City	1–3	Blackpool	Exeter
15:00 GMT	Alli 82'	Report	Hamilton 33'; Bloxham 43'; Fletcher 45+1'	Stadium: St James Park; Attendance: 6,325 (342 away); Referee: James Oldham

28 January 2024 29	Lincoln City	0–2	Blackpool	Lincoln
19:45 GMT		Report	Fletcher 32'; Casey 57'	Stadium: Sincil Bank; Attendance: 7,517 (224 away); Referee: Jeremy Simpson

1 February 2025 30	Blackpool	2–2	Charlton Athletic	Blackpool
15:00 GMT	Silvera 74'; Ennis 87'	Report	Godden 52'; Casey 54' (o.g.)	Stadium: Bloomfield Road; Attendance: 9,462; Referee: Thomas Parsons

8 February 2025 31	Burton Albion	1–1	Blackpool	Burton upon Trent
15:00 GMT	Burrell 19'	Report	Morgan 90+4'	Stadium: Pirelli Stadium

11 February 2025 19	Blackpool	0–0	Rotherham United	Blackpool
19:45 GMT		Report		Stadium: Bloomfield Road
Note: Fixture was originally scheduled for 7 December, but was postponed due to Storm Darragh.

15 February 2025 32	Blackpool	3–3	Mansfield Town	Blackpool
15:00 GMT	Carey 19'; Fletcher 71'; Ennis 77'	Report	Evans 24'; Baccus 29'; Akins 64'	Stadium: Bloomfield Road; Referee: Elliot Bell

22 February 2025 33	Blackpool	3–1	Crawley Town	Blackpool
15:00 GMT	Ennis 10' , 18'; Evans 79' (pen.)	Report	Doyle 30'	Stadium: Bloomfield Road

1 March 2025 34	Stockport County	2–1	Blackpool	Stockport
15:00 GMT		Report		Stadium: Edgeley Park; Attendance: 10,554 (1,119 away)

4 March 2025 35	Blackpool	0–0	Peterborough United	Blackpool
19:45 GMT		Report		Stadium: Bloomfield Road

8 March 2025 36	Barnsley	0–3	Blackpool	Barnsley
15:00 GMT		Report		Stadium: Oakwell; Attendance: 11,563

11 March 2025 26	Blackpool	2–1	Cambridge United	Blackpool
19:45 GMT		Report		Stadium: Bloomfield Road
Note: Fixture was originally scheduled for 11 January, but was postponed due to a frozen pitch.

15 March 2025 37	Blackpool	1–2	Leyton Orient	Blackpool
15:00 GMT		Report		Stadium: Bloomfield Road

22 March 2025 38	Northampton Town	0–2	Blackpool	Northampton
15:00 GMT		Report		Stadium: Sixfields Stadium; Attendance: 6,714 (511 away)

29 March 2025 39	Blackpool	2–1	Bolton Wanderers	Blackpool
15:00 GMT	Fletcher 13'; Ennis 59'	Report	Collins 35'	Stadium: Bloomfield Road; Attendance: 11,602; Referee: Graham Scott

1 April 2025 40	Blackpool	3–0	Reading	Blackpool
19:45 BST	Carey 53' , 90+4'; Casey 55'	Report		Stadium: Bloomfield Road; Attendance: 8,345; Referee: Aaron Bannister

5 April 2025 41	Rotherham United	2–1	Blackpool	Rotherham
15:00 BST		Report		Stadium: New York Stadium; Attendance: 9,172 (1,076 away)

18 April 2025 43	Stevenage	1–3	Blackpool	Stevenage
15:00 BST		Report		Stadium: Broadhall Way; Attendance: 4,161 (558 away)

21 April 2025 44	Blackpool	1–2	Wrexham	Blackpool
15:00 BST		Report		Stadium: Bloomfield Road; Attendance: 12,266; Referee: Darren Drysdale

26 April 2025 45	Wigan Athletic	1–1	Blackpool	Wigan
15:00 BST		Report		Stadium: Brick Community Stadium; Attendance: 11,176 (1,794 away)

30 April 2025 42	Blackpool	0–2	Birmingham City	Blackpool
19:45 BST		Report	Laird 39'; May 51'	Stadium: Bloomfield Road; Attendance: 9,618; Referee: Martin Woods
Note: Fixture was initially scheduled for 12 April, but was postponed due to Birmingham's involvement in the 2025 EFL Trophy final.

03 May 2025 46	Blackpool	4–1	Bristol Rovers	Blackpool
15:00 BST	Bloxham 40'; Morgan 55'; Ennis 76'; Finnigan 89'	Report	O'Donkor 18'	Stadium: Bloomfield Road; Attendance: 10,534; Referee: Ben Speedie

=== FA Cup ===
Blackpool were drawn away to Gillingham in the first round and at home to Birmingham City in the second round.

Win Draw Loss Fixtures

2 November 2024 First round	Gillingham	0–2	Blackpool	Gillingham
15:00 GMT		Report		Stadium: Priestfield Stadium; Attendance: 4,403; Referee: Carl Brook

1 December 2024 Second round	Blackpool	1–2	Birmingham City	Blackpool
13:00 GMT	Rhodes 55'	Report	Dykes 6'; Jutkewicz 24'	Stadium: Bloomfield Road; Attendance: 4,835; Referee: Tom Nield

=== EFL Cup ===
On 27 June, the draw for the first round was made, with Blackpool being drawn away against Burton Albion. In the second round, they were drawn away to Blackburn Rovers. In the third round, Blackpool were drawn at home to Sheffield Wednesday.

Win Draw Loss Fixtures

13 August 2024 First round	Burton Albion	0–4	Blackpool	Burton upon Trent
19:45 BST		Report	Finnigan 69'; Pennington 76', 81'; Evans 90+1'	Stadium: Pirelli Stadium; Attendance: 1,522; Referee: Matthew Corlett

27 August 2024 Second round	Blackburn Rovers	1–2	Blackpool	Blackburn
19:45 BST	Gueye 21' (pen.)	Report	Beesley 72'; Coulson 77'	Stadium: Ewood Park; Attendance: 9,418

17 September 2024 Third round	Blackpool	0–1	Sheffield Wednesday	Blackpool
19:45 BST		Report	Bernard 34'	Stadium: Bloomfield Road; Attendance: 5,429; Referee: Thomas Kirk

=== EFL Trophy ===
In the group stage, Blackpool were drawn into Northern Group E alongside Crewe Alexandra, Harrogate Town and Liverpool U21. In the round of 32, Blackpool were drawn at home against Aston Villa U21.

==== Group stage ====
Pos	Div	Team	Pld	W	PW	PL	L	GF	GA	GD	Pts	Qualification
1	L1	Blackpool	3	1	1	1	0	6	3	+3	6	Advance to Round 2
2	L2	Crewe Alexandra	3	2	0	0	1	7	5	+2	6	Advance to Round 2
3	ACA	Liverpool U21	3	0	1	1	1	2	6	−4	3	
4	L2	Harrogate Town	3	0	1	1	1	3	4	−1	3	

Source: EFL

Win Draw Loss Fixtures

3 September 2024 Group stage	Blackpool	4–1	Crewe Alexandra	Blackpool
19:00 BST	Rhodes 3'; Hamilton 43', 63'; Carey 55'	Report	Bogle 65'	Stadium: Bloomfield Road; Attendance: 1,474; Referee: Martin Woods

6 November 2024 Group stage	Blackpool	0–0 (7–8 p)	Liverpool U21	Blackpool
19:00 GMT				Stadium: Bloomfield Road; Attendance: 1,958

12 November 2024 Group stage	Harrogate Town	2–2 (4–5 p)	Blackpool	Harrogate
19:00 GMT				Stadium: Wetherby Road; Attendance: 1,343; Referee: Oliver Mackey

==== Knockout stages ====
17 December 2024 Round of 32	Blackpool	1–1 (17–18 p)	Aston Villa U21	Blackpool
19:00 GMT	Embleton 46'	Report	Jimoh-Aloba 78'	Stadium: Bloomfield Road; Attendance: 1,055; Referee: John Mulligan
	Penalties
	Rhodes (penalty scored); Morgan (penalty missed); Fletcher (penalty scored); Ballard (penalty scored); Ashworth (penalty scored); Coulson (penalty scored); Norburn (penalty scored); Lawrence-Gabriel (penalty scored); Richardson (penalty scored); Sassi (penalty scored); O'Donnell (penalty scored); Rhodes (penalty scored); Morgan (penalty scored); Fletcher (penalty scored); Ballard (penalty scored); Ashworth (penalty scored); Coulson (penalty scored); Norburn (penalty scored); Lawrence-Gabriel (penalty missed)		(penalty scored) Taylor; (penalty scored) Alcock; (penalty missed) Borland; (penalty scored) Lynch; (penalty scored) Smith; (penalty scored) Swinkels; (penalty scored) Cotcher; (penalty scored) Hemmings; (penalty scored) Patterson; (penalty scored) Rowe; (penalty scored) Zych; (penalty scored) Taylor; (penalty scored) Alcock; (penalty scored) Borland; (penalty scored) Lynch; (penalty scored) Smith; (penalty scored) Swinkels; (penalty scored) Cotcher; (penalty scored) Hemmings

== Transfers ==
=== In ===
Date	Pos.	Player	From	Fee	Ref.
27 June 2024	LB	Zac Ashworth (WAL)	West Bromwich Albion (ENG)	Undisclosed	
27 June 2024	LB	Hayden Coulson (ENG)	Middlesbrough (ENG)	Undisclosed	
1 July 2024 (Note: The transfer was announced on 20 June, and would become official on 1 July once his Watford contract expired)	CF	Ashley Fletcher (ENG)	Watford (ENG)	Free	
1 July 2024 (Note: The transfer was announced on 3 June, and would become official on 1 July once his Huddersfield Town contract expired)	CF	Jordan Rhodes (SCO)	Huddersfield Town (ENG)	Free	
8 July 2024	CM	Lee Evans (WAL)	Free agency	—	
8 August 2024	AM	Elliot Embleton (ENG)	Sunderland (ENG)	Undisclosed	
3 October 2024	CM	Josh Onomah (ENG)	Free agency	—	
14 January 2025	CF	Tom Bloxham (ENG)	Shrewsbury Town (ENG)	Undisclosed	

=== Out ===
Date	Pos.	Player	To	Fee	Ref.
23 July 2024	CF	Zak Emmerson (ENG)	FC Halifax Town (ENG)	Undisclosed	
23 August 2024	GK	Dan Grimshaw (ENG)	Plymouth Argyle (ENG)	Undisclosed	
2 January 2025	AM	Elliot Embleton (ENG)	Carlisle United (ENG)	Undisclosed	
20 January 2025	CF	Kyle Joseph (SCO)	Hull City (ENG)	Undisclosed	
9 February 2025	CB	Takudzwa Gwanzura (ENG)	Norwich City (ENG)	Undisclosed	

=== Loaned in ===
Date	Pos.	Player	From	Fee	Ref.
5 August 2024	CB	Elkan Baggott (INA)	Ipswich Town (ENG)	End of season	
13 August 2024	CF	Dom Ballard (ENG)	Southampton (ENG)	3 January 2025 (Note: On 3 January, Ballard was recalled back to Southampton)	
27 August 2024	GK	Harry Tyrer (ENG)	Everton (ENG)	End of season	
30 August 2024	RB	Odeluga Offiah (ENG)	Brighton & Hove Albion (ENG)	End of season	
13 January 2025	LW	Samuel Silvera (AUS)	Middlesbrough (ENG)	End of season	
30 January 2025	CF	Niall Ennis (ENG)	Stoke City (ENG)	End of season	

=== Loaned out ===
Date	Pos.	Player	To	Until	Ref.
26 July 2024	LW	Josh Miles (ENG)	Warrington Town (ENG)	31 October 2024	
9 August 2024	RB	Kwaku Donkor (ENG)	Welling United (ENG)	26 December 2024 (Note: On 9 November, Donkor's loan at Welling United was extended)	
9 August 2024	RB	Jack Moore (ENG)	Tamworth (ENG)	8 September 2024	
30 August 2024	CF	Kylian Kouassi (ENG)	Salford City (ENG)	End of season	
2 September 2024	CB	Dan Sassi (ENG)	Rochdale (ENG)	28 October 2024	
13 September 2024	RB	Jack Moore (ENG)	Chorley (ENG)	1 January 2025	
20 September 2024	CF	Jake Daniels (ENG)	Warrington Rylands (ENG)	End of Season (Note: On 24 January, Daniels' loan at Warrington Rylands was extended until the end of season)	
26 September 2024	LB	Alex Lankshear (ENG)	Welling United (ENG)	5 January 2024	
29 November 2024	GK	Harvey Bardsley (ENG)	Bamber Bridge (ENG)	31 December 2024	
29 November 2024	CB	Tyler Hill (ENG)	Nantwich Town (ENG)	31 December 2024	
14 January 2025	RB	Jack Moore (ENG)	Chorley (ENG)	End of season	
16 January 2025	LB	Zac Ashworth (WAL)	Ross County (SCO)	End of season	
16 January 2025	CB	Dan Sassi (ENG)	AFC Fylde (ENG)	End of season	
17 January 2025	CM	Oliver Norburn (GRN)	Wigan Athletic (ENG)	End of season	
24 January 2025	LW	Josh Miles (ENG)	FC United of Manchester (ENG)	End of season	
28 January 2025	RB	Kwaku Donkor (ENG)	Mickleover (ENG)	25 February 2025	
3 February 2025	CF	Jordan Rhodes (SCO)	Mansfield Town (ENG)	End of season	
25 March 2025	CF	Terry Bondo (ENG)	Matlock Town (ENG)	22 April 2025	

=== Released / out of contract ===
Date	Pos.	Player	Subsequent club	Join date	Ref.
14 June 2024	LW	Owen Moffat (SCO)	Greenock Morton (SCO)	18 June 2024	
30 June 2024	DM	Callum Connolly (ENG)	Stockport County (ENG)	1 July 2024	
30 June 2024	CB	Marvin Ekpiteta (ENG)	Hibernian (SCO)	1 July 2024	
30 June 2024	CF	Shayne Lavery (NIR)	Cambridge United (ENG)	1 July 2024	
30 June 2024	CM	Matty Virtue (ENG)	Fleetwood Town (ENG)	1 July 2024	
30 June 2024	CM	Dannen Francis (ENG)	None by 1 July 2024		
30 June 2024	CF	Brad Holmes (ENG)	None by 1 July 2024		
30 June 2024	CM	Donovan Lescott (ENG)	None by 1 July 2024		
30 June 2024	CM	Luke Mariette (WAL)	None by 1 July 2024		
30 June 2024	CB	Will Squires (ENG)	None by 1 July 2024		
30 June 2024	AM	Tayt Trusty (CYP)	None by 1 July 2024		
24 January 2025	LB	Dominic Thompson (ENG)	—		

== Statistics ==
=== Appearances and goals ===
As of match played 30 April 2025

Players with no appearances are not included on the list
Italics indicate a loaned-in player

No.	Pos	Nat	Player	Total		League One		FA Cup		EFL Cup		EFL Trophy	
No.	Pos	Nat	Player	Apps	Goals	Apps	Goals	Apps	Goals	Apps	Goals	Apps	Goals
1	GK	(England) ENG	Richard O'Donnell	11	0	6+0	0	1+0	0	3+0	0	1+0	0
3	DF	(England) ENG	James Husband	38	3	31+3	3	1+0	0	1+1	0	0+1	0
4	DF	(England) ENG	Jordan Lawrence-Gabriel	36	0	13+16	0	1+1	0	1+1	0	2+1	0
5	DF	(England) ENG	Matthew Pennington	28	2	17+3	0	1+1	0	3+0	2	3+0	0
6	MF	(Grenada) GRN	Oliver Norburn	13	0	6+2	0	1+0	0	2+0	0	1+1	0
7	MF	(Wales) WAL	Lee Evans	44	5	39+2	4	1+0	0	0+2	1	0+0	0
8	MF	(England) ENG	Albie Morgan	38	4	35+0	4	0+1	0	1+0	0	0+1	0
10	MF	(England) ENG	Sonny Carey	37	11	23+10	8	1+0	2	2+0	0	1+0	1
11	FW	(England) ENG	Ashley Fletcher	47	11	32+8	11	0+1	0	1+1	0	3+1	0
12	DF	(Indonesia) IDN	Elkan Baggott	19	0	14+3	0	0+0	0	1+0	0	1+0	0
14	FW	(England) ENG	Tom Bloxham	13	1	4+9	1	0+0	0	0+0	0	0+0	0
15	DF	(England) ENG	Hayden Coulson	40	1	25+9	0	1+0	0	1+2	1	2+0	0
16	FW	(Scotland) SCO	Jordan Rhodes	28	3	3+18	0	0+2	1	1+0	0	4+0	2
17	MF	(England) ENG	Josh Onomah	18	1	3+12	1	0+2	0	0+0	0	1+0	0
18	FW	(England) ENG	Jake Beesley	27	2	3+18	1	0+1	0	3+0	1	2+0	0
19	FW	(Australia) AUS	Samuel Silvera	15	1	3+12	1	0+0	0	0+0	0	0+0	0
20	DF	(England) ENG	Oliver Casey	48	3	42+0	3	2+0	0	2+1	0	1+0	0
21	FW	(England) ENG	Niall Ennis	18	6	16+2	6	0+0	0	0+0	0	0+0	0
22	MF	(Republic of Ireland) IRL	CJ Hamilton	36	5	21+12	3	0+0	0	0+1	0	1+1	2
23	DF	(England) ENG	Dominic Thompson	9	0	0+3	0	0+1	0	1+0	0	4+0	0
24	DF	(England) ENG	Odeluga Offiah	42	1	40+0	1	2+0	0	0+0	0	0+0	0
25	FW	(Scotland) SCO	Rob Apter	49	8	39+5	8	1+0	0	2+1	0	0+1	0
26	DF	(Wales) WAL	Zac Ashworth	13	0	1+5	0	0+0	0	3+0	0	4+0	0
28	MF	(England) ENG	Ryan Finnigan	15	2	2+5	0	2+0	0	1+2	1	3+0	1
30	GK	(England) ENG	Harry Tyrer	41	0	37+0	0	1+0	0	0+0	0	3+0	0
34	DF	(England) ENG	Dan Sassi	1	0	0+0	0	0+0	0	0+0	0	1+0	0
39	DF	(England) ENG	Alex Lankshear	1	0	0+0	0	0+0	0	0+0	0	0+1	0
40	MF	(England) ENG	Theo Upton	2	0	0+0	0	0+0	0	0+0	0	1+1	0
41	FW	(England) ENG	Terry Bondo	6	0	0+3	0	0+0	0	0+0	0	1+2	0
42	MF	(England) ENG	Spencer Knight	2	0	0+0	0	0+0	0	0+0	0	1+1	0
44	DF	(England) ENG	Takudzwa Gwanzura	1	0	0+0	0	0+0	0	0+0	0	0+1	0
47	MF	(England) ENG	Jack Richardson	1	0	0+0	0	0+0	0	0+0	0	0+1	0
48	MF	(England) ENG	Gabriel Schluter	1	0	0+0	0	0+0	0	0+0	0	0+1	0
Player(s) who featured while on loan but returned to parent club during the season:
19	FW	(England) ENG	Dom Ballard	22	1	10+8	1	2+0	0	0+1	0	0+1	0
Player(s) who featured but departed the club permanently during the season:
9	FW	(Scotland) SCO	Kyle Joseph	29	7	24+0	7	2+0	0	1+2	0	0+0	0
14	MF	(England) ENG	Elliot Embleton	23	1	4+11	0	2+0	0	3+0	0	3+0	1
32	GK	(England) ENG	Daniel Grimshaw	2	0	2+0	0	0+0	0	0+0	0	0+0	0
