= Ryan Finnigan =

English footballer

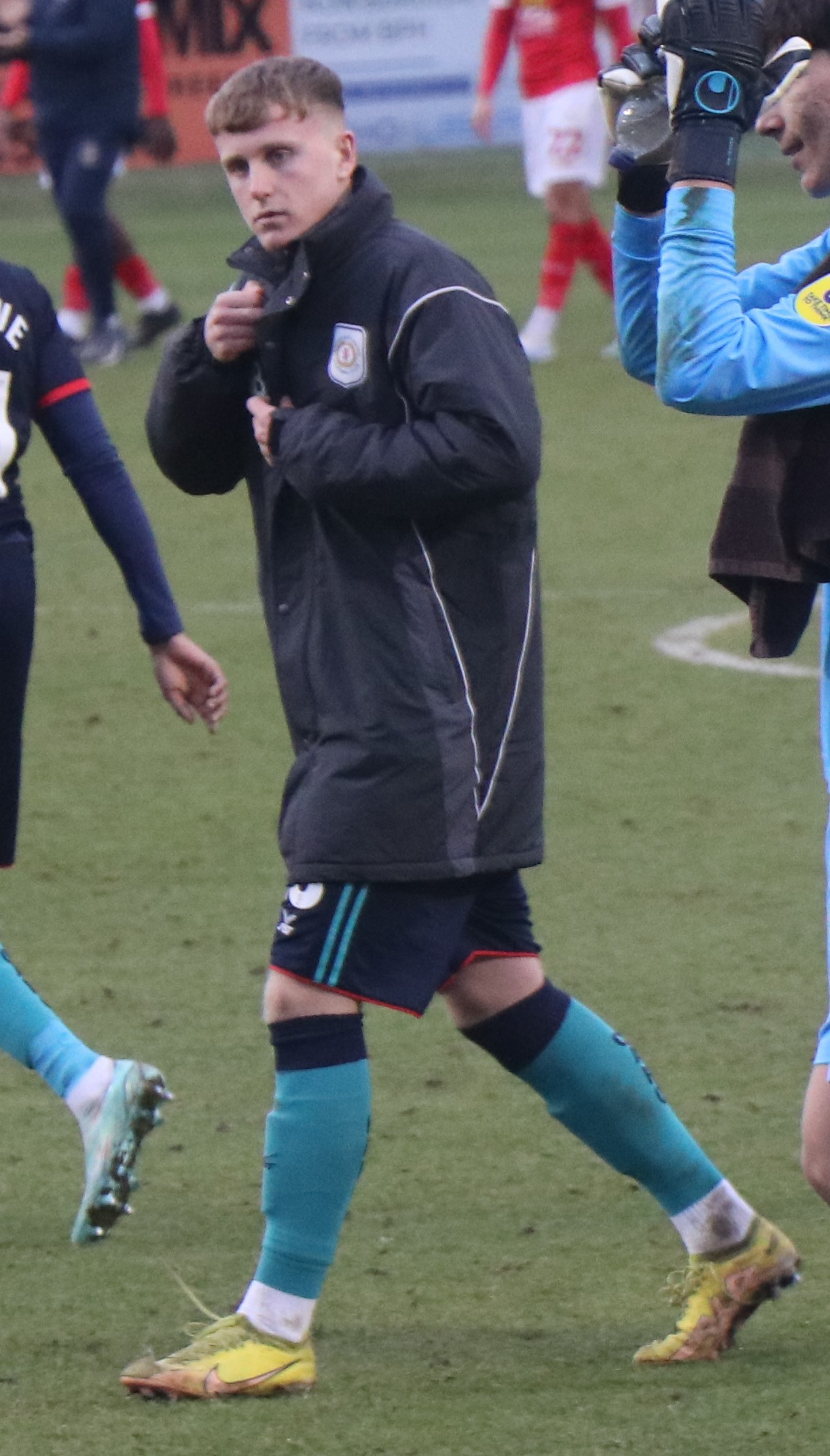
- Finnigan in 2023

Personal information
- Full name: Ryan James Finnigan
- Date of birth: 22 September 2003 (age 23)
- Place of birth: Poole, England
- Position: Central midfielder

Team information
- Current team: Dundee
- Number: 8

Youth career
- 2012–2021: Southampton

Senior career*
Years	Team	Apps	(Gls)
2021–2024	Southampton	0	(0)
2023	→ Crewe Alexandra (loan)	16	(1)
2023–2024	→ Shrewsbury Town (loan)	1	(0)
2024–2026	Blackpool	17	(1)
2025–2026	→ Walsall (loan)	21	(3)
2026–	Dundee	9	(0)
- * Club domestic league appearances and goals as of 21:50, 21 November 2026 (UTC)

Ryan James Finnigan (born 22 September 2003) is an English professional footballer who plays as a central midfielder for Scottish Premiership club Dundee.

== Club career ==
=== Southampton ===
Having joined Southampton's academy in May 2012, Finnigan signed a professional contract with the club in December 2020. On 19 January 2021, Finnigan made his first professional appearance in Southampton's victory over Shrewsbury Town in the FA Cup.

==== Crewe Alexandra (loan) ====
On 18 January 2023, Finnigan joined League Two side Crewe Alexandra for the remainder of the season, making his Crewe debut against Stockport County at Gresty Road on 31 January 2023. In his fifth appearance for the Railwaymen, he scored his first professional goal, helping Crewe to a 2–0 home win against Hartlepool United on 14 February 2023.

==== Shrewsbury Town (loan) ====
On 1 September 2023, Finnigan joined League One side Shrewsbury Town on a season-long loan. He made his debut for the club on 5 September 2023 in a 3–0 defeat to Forest Green Rovers in the EFL Trophy. At the end of September, Finnigan suffered an ankle injury during training and was expected to be sidelined for several months.

=== Blackpool ===
On 31 January 2024, Finnigan was recalled from loan and joined League One side Blackpool on a permanent transfer for an undisclosed fee. He scored on his debut for the club, a 4–0 over Burton Albion in the first round of the EFL Cup on 13 August 2024.

==== Walsall (loan) ====
On 18 August 2025, Finnigan joined League Two side Walsall on a season-long loan. He was named EFL League Two Player of the Month for November 2025, contributing three goals as the Saddlers continued their push for promotion. He was recalled by Blackpool on 5 January 2026.

On 6 May 2026, Blackpool announced it had triggered an extension on the player's contract.

=== Dundee ===
On 27 June 2026, Finnigan joined Scottish Premiership club Dundee on a three-year deal for an undisclosed fee.

== Career statistics ==
=== Club ===
As of match played 21 November 2026

Appearances and goals by club, season and competition
Club	Season	League			National cup		League cup		Other		Total	
Club	Season	Division	Apps	Goals	Apps	Goals	Apps	Goals	Apps	Goals	Apps	Goals
Southampton	2020–21	Premier League	0	0	1	0	0	0	0	0	1	0
Southampton U21	2020–21	—			—		—		1 (Note: Appearances in EFL Trophy)	0	1	0
Southampton U21	2021–22	—			—		—		1	0	1	0
Southampton U21	2022–23	—			—		—		2	0	2	0
Southampton U21	Total		—		—		—		4	0	4	0
Crewe Alexandra (loan)	2022–23	League Two	16	1	0	0	0	0	0	0	16	1
Shrewsbury Town (loan)	2023–24	League One	1	0	0	0	0	0	2	0	3	0
Blackpool	2023–24	League One	0	0	0	0	0	0	0	0	0	0
Blackpool	2024–25	League One	8	1	2	0	3	1	3	1	16	3
Blackpool	2025–26	League One	9	0	0	0	1	0	0	0	10	0
Blackpool	Total		17	1	2	0	4	1	3	1	26	3
Walsall (loan)	2025–26	League Two	21	3	2	0	—		3	1	26	4
Dundee	2026–27	Scottish Premiership	9	0	0	0	5	0	0	0	14	0
Career total			64	5	5	0	9	1	12	2	89	8

== Honours ==
Individual

- EFL League Two Player of the Month: November 2025
