= Zac Ashworth =

Welsh footballer (born 2002)

Personal information
- Full name: Zachary Ashworth
- Date of birth: 6 September 2002 (age 24)
- Place of birth: King's Lynn, England
- Height: 5 ft 9 in (1.76 m)
- Position: Left-back

Team information
- Current team: Blackpool
- Number: 3

Youth career
- 2012–2022: West Bromwich Albion

Senior career*
| Years | Team | Apps | (Gls) |
| 2022–2024 | West Bromwich Albion | 2 | (0) |
| 2023 | → Burton Albion (loan) | 18 | (0) |
| 2023–2024 | → Bolton Wanderers (loan) | 16 | (2) |
| 2024– | Blackpool | 36 | (1) |
| 2025 | → Ross County (loan) | 10 | (0) |

International career^{‡}
| 2022–2024 | Wales U21 | 10 | (0) |
- * Club domestic league appearances and goals as of 22 August 2026 (UTC) ‡ National team caps and goals as of 15:13, 15 October 2024

Zachary Ashworth (born 6 September 2002) is a professional footballer who plays as a left-back for EFL League One club Blackpool. He is a former Wales under-21 international.

== Club career ==
=== West Bromwich Albion ===
Ashworth joined West Bromwich Albion's academy aged 10. He signed a two-year professional contract with the club in July 2021. He made his senior debut as a substitute in a 2–1 FA Cup defeat to Brighton & Hove Albion on 8 January 2022. He made his league debut for the club on 30 April 2022 as a half-time substitute for the injured Conor Townsend in a 1–0 win at Reading. On 6 July 2022, Ashworth signed a new three-year contract with West Bromwich Albion, which would have kept him at the club until 2025.

On 17 January 2023, Ashworth joined League One club Burton Albion on loan until the end of the season. He made his debut for the club on 28 January 2023, in a 2–0 win against Oxford United.

On 20 July 2023, Ashworth joined League One club Bolton Wanderers on a season-long loan. He scored on his debut for Bolton in a 1–0 win over Barrow in the EFL Cup on 8 August 2023.

=== Blackpool ===
On 27 June 2024, Blackpool announced the signing of Ashworth, on a three-year deal from West Bromwich Albion, for an undisclosed fee. He made his debut for the club on 13 August 2024, in a 4–0 win against Burton Albion in the EFL Cup.

In January 2025, Ashworth joined Scottish Premiership side Ross County on loan until the end of the season. He made his debut for the club on 18 January 2025, in a 3–2 defeat to Livingston in the Scottish Cup.

Ashworth scored his first goal for Blackpool, against Northampton Town in League One, on 24 January 2026.

== International career ==
Ashworth was called up to the Wales under-21 squad in March 2022 for the 2023 European under-21 Championship qualifying matches against Switzerland and Bulgaria.

== Personal life ==
Ashworth is the son of former West Bromwich Albion and Manchester United sporting director Dan Ashworth. He grew up as a West Bromwich Albion supporter. His younger brother, Finn, turned professional at Wolverhampton Wanderers in 2024.

== Career statistics ==
As of 25 August 2026

Appearances and goals by club, season and competition
| Club | Season | League | | | National Cup (Note: Includes FA Cup, Scottish Cup) | | League Cup (Note: Includes EFL Cup, Scottish League Cup) | | Other | | Total | |
| Club | Season | Division | Apps | Goals | Apps | Goals | Apps | Goals | Apps | Goals | Apps | Goals |
|---|---|---|---|---|---|---|---|---|---|---|---|---|
| West Bromwich Albion | 2021–22 | Championship | 2 | 0 | 1 | 0 | 0 | 0 | — | | 3 | 0 |
| West Bromwich Albion | 2022–23 | Championship | 0 | 0 | 1 | 0 | 2 | 0 | — | | 3 | 0 |
| West Bromwich Albion | 2023–24 | Championship | 0 | 0 | 0 | 0 | 0 | 0 | 0 | 0 | 0 | 0 |
| West Bromwich Albion | Total | | 2 | 0 | 2 | 0 | 2 | 0 | 0 | 0 | 6 | 0 |
| Burton Albion (loan) | 2022–23 | League One | 18 | 0 | — | | — | | — | | 18 | 0 |
| Bolton Wanderers (loan) | 2023–24 | League One | 16 | 2 | 2 | 0 | 2 | 1 | 3 (Note: Appearances in EFL Trophy) | 0 | 23 | 3 |
| Blackpool | 2024–25 | League One | 6 | 0 | 0 | 0 | 3 | 0 | 4 | 0 | 13 | 0 |
| Blackpool | 2025–26 | League One | 28 | 1 | 3 | 0 | 0 | 0 | 4 | 0 | 35 | 1 |
| Blackpool | 2026–27 | League One | 2 | 0 | 0 | 0 | 2 | 0 | 0 | 0 | 4 | 0 |
| Blackpool | Total | | 36 | 1 | 3 | 0 | 5 | 0 | 8 | 0 | 52 | 1 |
| Ross County (loan) | 2024–25 | Scottish Premiership | 10 | 0 | 1 | 0 | 0 | 0 | 2 (Note: Appearances in the Scottish Premiership play-offs) | 0 | 13 | 0 |
| Career total | | | 82 | 3 | 8 | 0 | 9 | 1 | 13 | 0 | 112 | 4 |

== Honours ==
West Bromwich Albion U23

- Premier League Cup: 2021–22
