= Reuell Walters =

English footballer (born 2004)

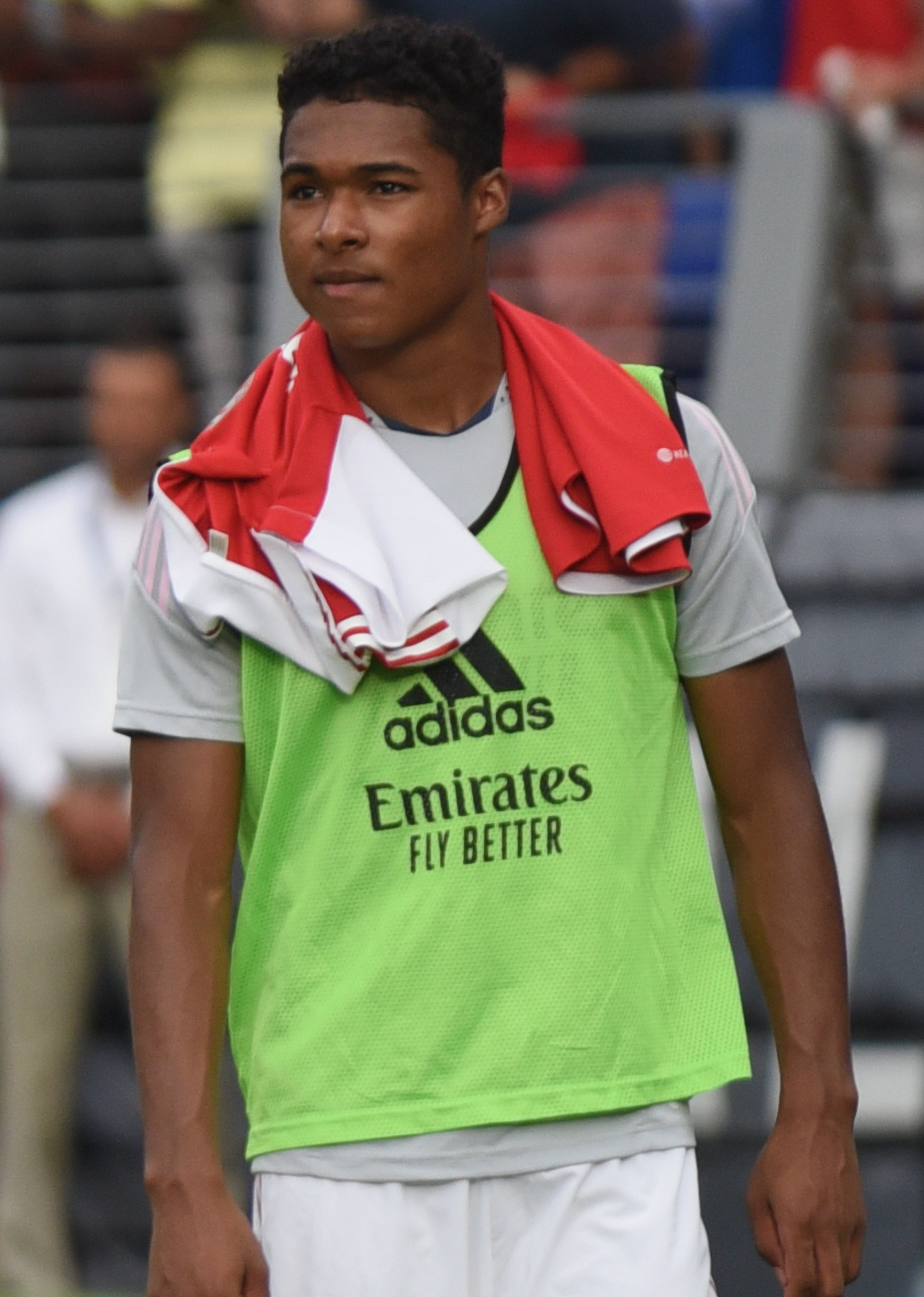
- Walters in 2022

Personal information
- Full name: Reuell Joshua Walters
- Date of birth: 16 December 2004 (age 21)
- Place of birth: Lambeth, England
- Height: 1.86 m (6 ft 1 in)
- Positions: Right-back; centre-back

Team information
- Current team: Luton Town

Youth career
- 2012–2013: Peckham Town
- 2013–2015: Unique FA
- 2015–2019: Tottenham Hotspur
- 2020–2023: Arsenal

Senior career*
Years	Team	Apps	(Gls)
2023–2024	Arsenal	0	(0)
2024–	Luton Town	18	(0)
2026	→ Blackpool (loan)	16	(1)

International career^{‡}
2021–2022	England U18	5	(0)
2023	England U19	3	(0)
2024	England U20	2	(0)
- * Club domestic league appearances and goals as of 08:46, 4 May 2026 (UTC) ‡ National team caps and goals as of 22:23, 25 September 2024 (UTC)

Reuell Joshua Walters (born 16 December 2004) is an English professional footballer who plays as a right-back for EFL League One club Luton Town.

Having started his career in Arsenal's academy, he joined Luton in 2024. He had a loan spell at Blackpool in early 2026.

== Early life and youth career ==
Walters was born in Lambeth, South London to father Raphael and mother Aisha, a former British gymnastics champion. He grew up in Streatham.

Having briefly played for a Brazilian soccer school in London until its closure, Walters had a spell with Peckham Town at the age of seven. He went on to spend two seasons with Unique FA, before being recommended to trial with both Chelsea and Tottenham Hotspur by Unique FA founder Jamie Waller.

He was offered a deal by both, and Walters joined the Tottenham Hotspur academy in March 2015 at the age of ten, with his family moving to Potters Bar, Hertfordshire. After a bright start for Spurs, playing in older age groups as he progressed, he eventually lost interest in football, with his father saying that he felt "lost" at the time. After four years at the club, he played his last game in March 2019, with his deal ending in June of the same year.

Following the expiration of his contract with Tottenham Hotspur, he was offered a deal by a number of professional sides, including Manchester United, who offered him a schoolboy contract. Walters agreed to join Manchester United, rejecting rivals Manchester City in the process. However, the Premier League declined Walters' registration as United had already met their quota, as departing players were still registered at the time.

Following his collapsed move to Manchester United, a trial period was arranged with Charlton Athletic, but following the outbreak of the COVID-19 pandemic, this did not come to fruition. During this time, he trained on a 1-to-1 basis with Saul Isaksson-Hurst, a footballing consultant who had organised his trial with Manchester United. Isaksson-Hurst would invite Lee Heron, the head of youth development at Arsenal – the club Walters had supported since he was a child – to watch him train. He was invited to a trial with Arsenal in August 2020.

== Club career ==
=== Arsenal ===
Following an investigation by the Premier League, to ensure he had not been tapped up, Walters joined Arsenal as an under-16 on 19 October 2020. He was called to the Under-21s team by then coach Kevin Betsy in the 2021–22 season as an inverting and overlapping full-back/wing-back. He signed his first professional contract with the club in February 2022.

In July 2022, Walters was one of five academy players to travel with the first team to Germany for a mini training camp at the Adidas headquarters in Herzogenaurach, and started as a right-sided centre-back in the friendly to 2. Bundesliga side 1. FC Nürnberg on 8 July. In the same month he was the only academy player taken to the U.S. tour, where he made a substitute appearance at left-back against Premier League side Everton on 16 July. In the 2022–23 season, he played left-sided centre-back in Arsenal's Under-18s FA Youth Cup run coached by Jack Wilshere.

Walters appeared multiple times as an unused substitute for the Arsenal first team from March 2023 onwards, with the first being in the UEFA Europa League round of 16 match away to Sporting CP at Estádio José Alvalade in Lisbon, Portugal on 9 March.

=== Luton Town ===
After turning down a extension for Arsenal, Walters signed for EFL Championship side Luton Town following the expiry of his contract on 11 July 2024. On 12 August, he made his debut for the club in a 4–1 loss against Burnley in the league. He went on to make 16 appearances in his first season at the club.

He made two league starts in the 2025–26 season before suffering a groin injury, ruling him out for three weeks. After struggling to regain his place in the first-team under his former Arsenal boss Jack Wilshere, Walters was sent out on loan for the remainder of the season.

==== Loan to Blackpool ====
On 2 February 2026, Walters joined fellow League One club Blackpool on loan for the remainder of the season. He made 16 appearances during his three months at the club, as well as scoring the first senior goal of his career.

== International career ==
Walters is eligible to represent England, Germany and Jamaica at international level.

Having been previously called up to the England Under-18s, Walters made his Under-19s debut on 22 March 2023 during a 1–0 win over Hungary at the Bescot Stadium during their 2023 UEFA European Under-19 Championship qualifier.

On 26 March 2024, Walters made his England Under-20s debut during a 3–1 win away to Czechia.

== Career statistics ==
As of match played 2 May 2026

Appearances and goals by club, season and competition
Club	Season	League			FA Cup		League Cup		Other		Total	
Club	Season	Division	Apps	Goals	Apps	Goals	Apps	Goals	Apps	Goals	Apps	Goals
Arsenal U21	2021–22	—	—		—		—		4 (Note: Appearance(s) in EFL Trophy)	0	4	0
Arsenal U21	2022–23	—	—		—		—		3	0	3	0
Arsenal U21	2023–24	—	—		—		—		2	0	2	0
Arsenal U21	Total		—		—		—		9	0	9	0
Arsenal	2022–23	Premier League	0	0	0	0	0	0	0	0	0	0
Arsenal	2023–24	Premier League	0	0	0	0	0	0	0	0	0	0
Arsenal	Total		0	0	0	0	0	0	0	0	0	0
Luton Town	2024–25	Championship	14	0	1	0	1	0	—		16	0
Luton Town	2025–26	League One	4	0	1	0	0	0	2	0	7	0
Luton Town	Total		18	0	2	0	1	0	2	0	23	0
Blackpool (loan)	2025–26	League One	16	1	0	0	0	0	0	0	16	1
Career total			34	1	2	0	1	0	11	0	48	1
