= Kylian Kouassi =

English footballer

Personal information
- Full name: Kylian Prince-Emmanuel Tresor Kouassi
- Date of birth: 18 June 2003 (age 23)
- Place of birth: England
- Height: 1.80 m (5 ft 11 in)
- Position: Forward

Team information
- Current team: Colchester United
- Number: 14

Youth career
- –2020: Sutton United

Senior career*
Years	Team	Apps	(Gls)
2020–2023	Sutton United	40	(2)
2020	→ Bedfont Sports (loan)	2	(0)
2021	→ Hampton & Richmond Borough (loan)	2	(0)
2021–2022	→ Chesham United (loan)	20	(7)
2023–2026	Blackpool	21	(1)
2024–2025	→ Salford City (loan)	27	(3)
2025–2026	→ Cambridge United (loan)	14	(2)
2026–	Colchester United	1	(0)
- * Club domestic league appearances and goals as of 20:08, 2 September 2026 (UTC)

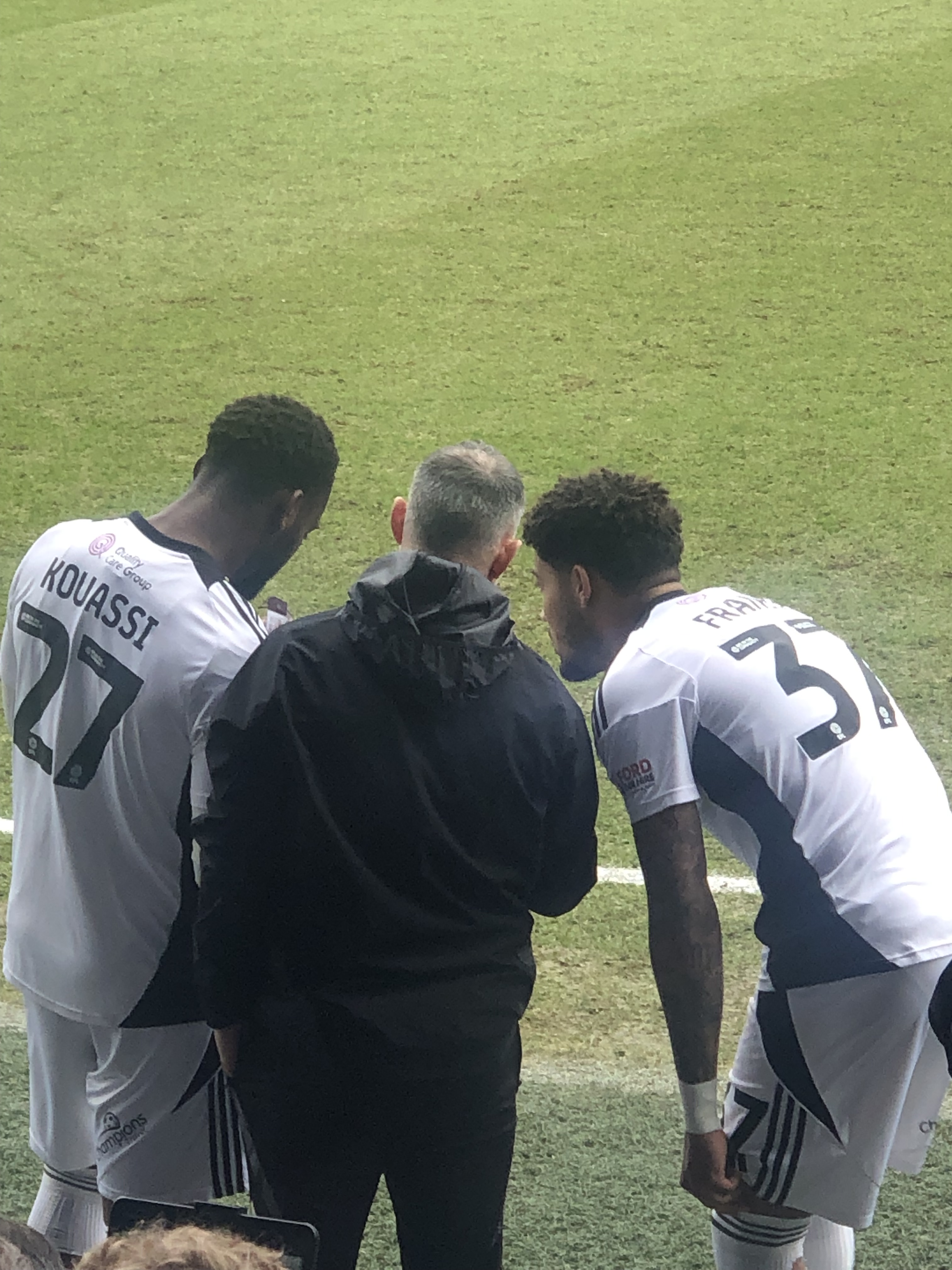
Ryan Giggs giving advice to Kylian Kouassi and Francis Okoronkwo during the ongoing AFC Wimbledon and Salford City match.

Kylian Prince-Emmanuel Tresor Kouassi (born 18 June 2003) is an English professional footballer who plays as a forward for EFL League Two club Colchester United.

== Club career ==
Kouassi is a product of Sutton United's academy and has had loan spells at Bedfont Sports, Hampton & Richmond Borough and Chesham United between 2020 and 2022.

He made his Football League debut on 5 March 2022, during Sutton's 3–0 home victory over Rochdale, replacing Omar Bugiel in the 81st minute. He made three further substitute appearances for Sutton during their 2021–2022 EFL League Two season. Koussai scored his first competitive goal on 3 September 2022, coming off the bench in a 2–1 home win over Harrogate Town.

Upon the expiration of his contract, Kouassi signed for Blackpool on 26 August 2023.

On 30 August 2024, he joined Salford City on loan until the end of the season.

Kouassi went out on another season-long loan on 18 August 2025, this time to Cambridge United.

On 6 May 2026, Blackpool announced it had triggered an extension on the player's contract.

Kouassi joined League Two club Colchester United on 1 September 2026 on a two-year contract.

== Career statistics ==
As of end of 2025–26 season

Appearances and goals by club, season and competition
Club	Season	League			FA Cup		League Cup		Other		Total	
Club	Season	Division	Apps	Goals	Apps	Goals	Apps	Goals	Apps	Goals	Apps	Goals
Sutton United	2020–21	National League	0	0	0	0	—		0	0	0	0
Sutton United	2021–22	League Two	4	0	0	0	0	0	0	0	4	0
Sutton United	2022–23	League Two	36	2	1	0	1	0	4 (Note: Appearances in the EFL Trophy)	2	42	4
Sutton United	Total		40	2	1	0	1	0	4	2	46	4
Bedfont Sports (loan)	2020–21	Isthmian League South Central Division	2	0	—		—		1 (Note: Appearance in the FA Trophy)	0	3	0
Hampton & Richmond Borough (loan)	2021–22	National League South	2	0	2	0	—		0	0	4	0
Chesham United (loan)	2021–22	Southern League Premier Division South	20	7	—		—		2 (Note: One appearance and one goal in the FA Trophy, one appearance in the Southern League Cup)	1	22	8
Blackpool	2023–24	League One	19	1	1	0	0	0	4	4	24	5
Blackpool	2024–25	League One	0	0	0	0	0	0	0	0	0	0
Blackpool	2025–26	League One	0	0	0	0	0	0	0	0	0	0
Blackpool	Total		19	1	1	0	0	0	4	4	24	5
Salford City (loan)	2024–25	League Two	27	3	3	0	0	0	1	0	31	3
Cambridge United (loan)	2025–26	League Two	14	2	1	2	2	1	2	0	19	5
Career total			124	15	8	2	3	1	14	7	149	25
