= Dan Sassi =

English footballer (born 2003)

Personal information
- Full name: Daniel Christopher Anthony Sassi
- Date of birth: 8 December 2003 (age 22)
- Place of birth: Uttoxeter, England
- Height: 1.90 m (6 ft 3 in)
- Position: Central defender

Team information
- Current team: Newport County
- Number: 34

Youth career
- –2020: Stoke City
- 2020–2023: Burnley

Senior career*
Years	Team	Apps	(Gls)
2023–2024	Burnley	0	(0)
2024–2026	Blackpool	0	(0)
2024	→ Rochdale (loan)	10	(0)
2024	→ Rochdale (loan)	4	(0)
2025	→ AFC Fylde (loan)	6	(0)
2025–2026	→ Altrincham (loan)	41	(0)
2026–	Newport County	5	(1)
- * Club domestic league appearances and goals as of 14:54, 21 November 2026 (UTC)

Daniel Christopher Anthony Sassi (born 8 December 2003) is an English professional footballer who plays as a centre-back for EFL League Two club Newport County.

== Career ==
Sassi started in the academy for Stoke City, and moved in the summer of 2020 to Burnley. On 1 February 2024, Sassi joined Blackpool, and moved on 23 February 2024 on loan to Rochdale.

On 2 September 2024, he returned to National League side Rochdale on an initial two-month loan deal. In January 2025, he joined AFC Fylde on loan for the remainder of the season.

Sassi went out on loan again, in August 2025, to Altrincham, initially until January 2026 but the loan was extended to the end of the season.

In June 2026 joined EFL League Two club Newport County on a permanent contract. He made his debut for Newport against Wimbledon on 8 August 2026 in the EFL Cup first round which Newport lost 5-4 on penalties after drawing 1-1 in normal time. Sassi scored his first Newport goal in the 2-2 League Two draw against Crewe Alexandra on 14 November 2026.

== Career statistics ==
As of match played 25 April 2026

Appearances and goals by club, season and competition
Club	Season	League			FA Cup		EFL Cup		Other		Total	
Club	Season	Division	Apps	Goals	Apps	Goals	Apps	Goals	Apps	Goals	Apps	Goals
Blackpool	2023–24	League One	0	0	0	0	0	0	0	0	0	0
Blackpool	2024–25	League One	0	0	0	0	0	0	1 (Note: Appearance(s) in EFL Trophy)	0	1	0
Blackpool	2025–26	League One	0	0	0	0	0	0	0	0	0	0
Blackpool	Total		0	0	0	0	0	0	1	0	1	0
Rochdale (loan)	2023–24	National League	10	0	0	0	—		0	0	10	0
Rochdale (loan)	2024–25	National League	4	0	0	0	—		0	0	4	0
AFC Fylde (loan)	2024–25	National League	6	0	0	0	—		0	0	6	0
Altrincham (loan)	2025–26	National League	41	0	1	0	—		0	0	42	0
Career total			61	0	1	0	0	0	1	0	63	0
