= Terry Bondo =

English footballer (born 2007)

Personal information
- Full name: Terry Bondo
- Date of birth: 8 February 2007 (age 19)
- Place of birth: Salford, England
- Height: 6 ft 3 in (1.91 m)
- Position: Forward

Team information
- Current team: Hartlepool United
- Number: 30

Youth career
- –2023: Oldham Athletic
- 2023–2024: Blackpool

Senior career*
Years	Team	Apps	(Gls)
2024–2026	Blackpool	5	(0)
2025	→ Matlock Town (loan)	6	(2)
2025	→ Marine (loan)	4	(0)
2026	→ King's Lynn Town (loan)	17	(4)
2026–	Hartlepool United	9	(0)
- * Club domestic league appearances and goals as of 23:23, 29 September 2026 (UTC)

Terry Bondo (born 8 February 2007) is an English professional footballer who plays as a forward for National League club Hartlepool United.

== Early life ==
Bondo was born in England and is of Congolese descent. He began his youth career at Oldham Athletic before joining Blackpool in the summer of 2023.

== Career ==
Bondo joined Blackpool's youth academy in 2023 and quickly became a key player for the under-18 squad, scoring four goals and providing four assists in his debut season.

He made his senior debut for Blackpool on 6 November 2024 in an EFL Trophy match against Liverpool U21. Bondo made his EFL League One debut on 16 November 2024 in a match against Northampton Town. On 25 March 2025, Bondo joined Northern Premier League Premier Division side Matlock Town on loan for the remainder of the season.

In September 2025, Bondo joined National League North club Marine on a three-month loan. He was recalled from his loan spell on 24 October.

On 7 February 2026, he joined National League North side King's Lynn Town on an initial one-month loan. He made his debut that same day, scoring a late winner against Radcliffe.

=== Hartlepool United ===
On 30 June 2026, he signed for National League club Hartlepool United on a deal until June 2027, with an option to extend for a further year. He made his first appearance on the opening match of the 2026–27 season, coming on as a second-half substitute in a 2–0 home win against Barrow and assisted the second goal.

== Career statistics ==
As of match played 3 November 2026

Appearances and goals by club, season and competition
Club	Season	League			FA Cup		League Cup		Other		Total	
Club	Season	Division	Apps	Goals	Apps	Goals	Apps	Goals	Apps	Goals	Apps	Goals
Blackpool	2024–25	League One	3	0	0	0	0	0	3 (Note: Appearances in EFL Trophy)	0	6	0
Blackpool	2025–26	League One	2	0	1	0	0	0	2	0	5	0
Blackpool	Total		5	0	1	0	0	0	5	0	11	0
Matlock Town (loan)	2024–25	NPL Premier Division	6	2	—		—		0	0	6	2
Marine (loan)	2025–26	National League North	4	0	1	0	0	0	0	0	5	0
King's Lynn Town (loan)	2025–26	National League North	17	4	0	0	0	0	0	0	17	4
Hartlepool United	2026–27	National League	9	0	1	0	0	0	3	2	13	2
Career total			41	6	3	0	0	0	8	2	52	8
