= Ashley Fletcher =

English footballer (born 1995)

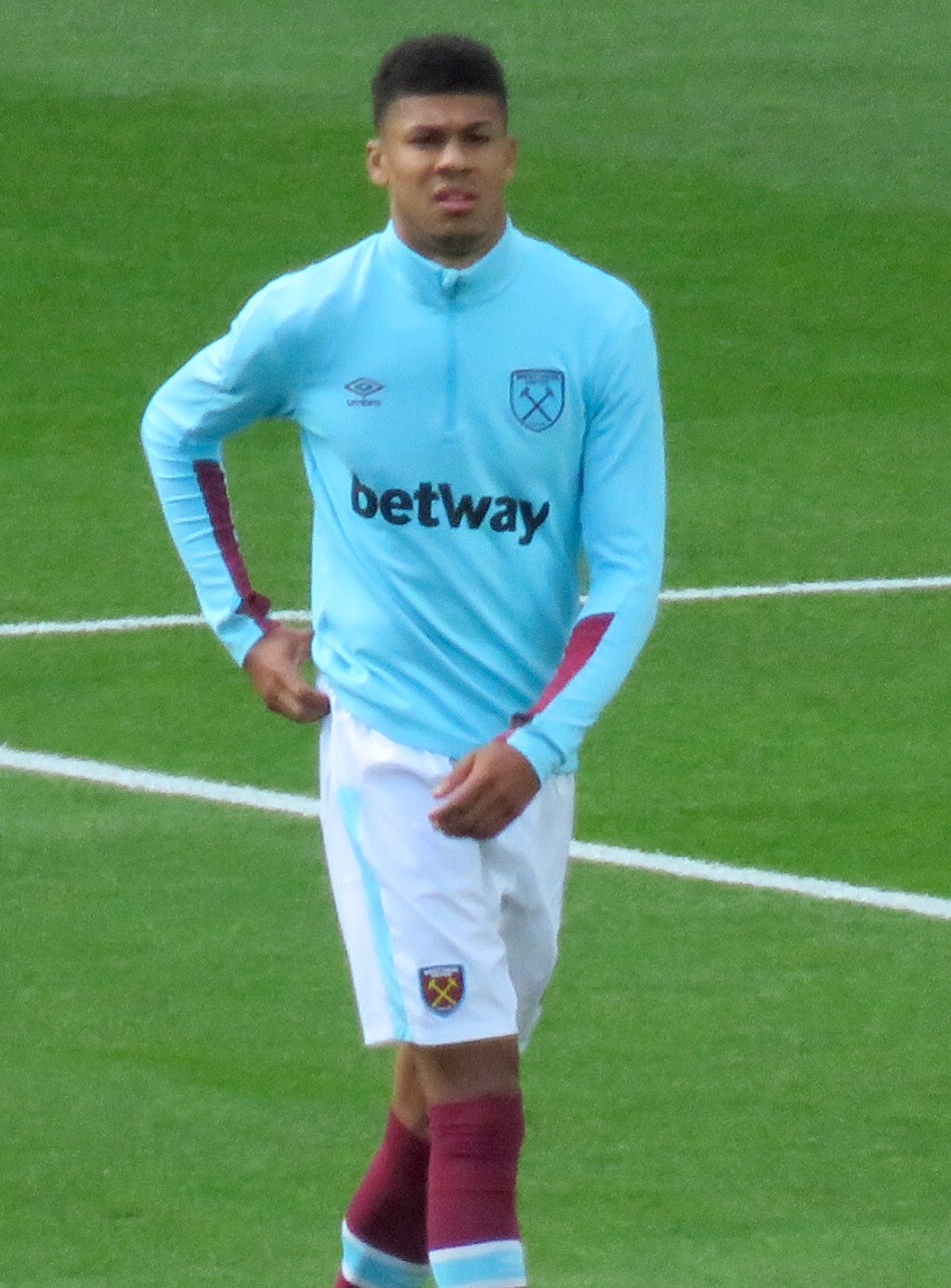
- Fletcher in 2016

Personal information
- Full name: Ashley Michael Fletcher
- Date of birth: 2 October 1995 (age 31)
- Place of birth: Keighley, England
- Height: 6 ft 1 in (1.85 m)
- Position: Forward

Team information
- Current team: Huddersfield Town
- Number: 11

Youth career
- 2005–2009: Bolton Wanderers
- 2009–2015: Manchester United

Senior career*
Years	Team	Apps	(Gls)
2015–2016	Manchester United	0	(0)
2016	→ Barnsley (loan)	21	(5)
2016–2017	West Ham United	16	(0)
2017–2021	Middlesbrough	92	(19)
2018	→ Sunderland (loan)	16	(2)
2021–2024	Watford	3	(0)
2022	→ New York Red Bulls (loan)	7	(0)
2022–2023	→ Wigan Athletic (loan)	26	(2)
2023–2024	→ Sheffield Wednesday (loan)	23	(0)
2024–2026	Blackpool	84	(26)
2026–	Huddersfield Town	15	(2)

International career^{‡}
2015–2016	England U20	3	(2)
- * Club domestic league appearances and goals as of 11:57, 22 November 2026 (UTC) ‡ National team caps and goals as of 12:43, 8 October 2017 (UTC)

Ashley Michael Fletcher (born 2 October 1995) is an English professional footballer who plays as a forward for EFL League One club Huddersfield Town.

Fletcher began his professional career at Manchester United, having previously played at Bolton Wanderers during his youth. He then went on to join Barnsley on loan in 2016, where he achieved promotion and silverware, before signing for West Ham United on a free transfer. After one season at the London Stadium, Fletcher relocated to Middlesbrough, where he broke into the first team. He has also briefly played for Sunderland, on loan from Middlesbrough, and Watford. In his three years at Watford, he was loaned out to New York Red Bulls, Wigan Athletic and Sheffield Wednesday. In 2024, he joined Blackpool in a permanent move. He signed for Huddersfield Town in the summer of 2026.

He has played at international level for the England under-20 team.

== Early life ==
Born in Keighley, West Yorkshire, Fletcher attended Canon Slade School in Bolton, where he obtained 12 GCSEs all with grades of either A or B. He played football, cricket, basketball, and athletics for the school.

== Club career ==
=== Manchester United ===
Fletcher joined Bolton Wanderers at the age of nine, before moving to Manchester United at the age of 13. He signed his first professional contract with Manchester United in May 2014.

Fletcher signed for Barnsley on loan in January 2016. He scored on his professional debut on 9 January 2016, in a 1–1 draw with Fleetwood Town in the Football League Trophy Northern Area Final first leg, and scored his first league goal on 20 February 2016.

On 3 April 2016 he scored a goal in the 2016 Football League Trophy Final as Barnsley won the competition. On 29 May 2016, he scored the opening goal in Barnsley's 3–1 victory in the 2016 Football League One play-off final against Millwall, helping Barnsley return to the Championship. In total Fletcher scored nine goals in 27 games for Barnsley during his spell at the club.

After impressing while on loan at Barnsley, Fletcher was offered a new contract at Manchester United amid interest from Championship side Leeds United. On 23 June 2016, it was reported that he had turned down the contract offer to stay at Manchester United but would continue to train at the club.

=== West Ham United ===
In July 2016, Fletcher signed a four-year deal with West Ham United.

He made his unofficial debut for West Ham United's development squad on 15 July 2016 in a 2–0 pre-season friendly defeat away to Chelmsford City.

His West Ham debut came on 18 August in the UEFA Europa League when he was introduced as a last minute substitute for Andy Carroll in a 3–0 win over NK Domžale. His Premier League debut came again from the substitutes bench on 21 August when he replaced Håvard Nordtveit after 80 minutes, in a 1–0 win over Bournemouth.

On 30 November 2016, Fletcher scored his first goal for West Ham, in a 4–1 defeat to Manchester United, in the EFL Cup quarter-final at Old Trafford.

=== Middlesbrough ===
On 28 July 2017, Fletcher signed for Middlesbrough for a fee of £6.5 million, signing a four-year contract. He made his debut on 5 August 2017 against Wolverhampton Wanderers in a 1–0 defeat. His first goal for the club came as the last of three in a 3–0 win against Scunthorpe United on 22 August 2017 in the EFL Cup, his first in the league came in a 3–2 win over Queens Park Rangers on 16 September.

On 31 January 2018, Fletcher made a deadline day switch to Sunderland, signing on loan for the remainder of the season. He scored his first goal for Sunderland in a 4–1 win at Derby County on 30 March 2018. Fletcher was a member of the Sunderland team that suffered relegation to League One at the end of the season, meaning that the club had suffered two consecutive relegations. Furthermore, his tenure at the club resulted in him appearing in the Netflix documentary series Sunderland 'Til I Die, released on 14 December 2018.

During the off-season, Fletcher returned to Middlesbrough, with fellow Championship club Hull City expressing their interest in signing the striker. However, no move materialised, though their manager Nigel Adkins later attempted to sign him again in the winter transfer window. During his second season with Middlesbrough, Fletcher broke into Tony Pulis' team. He went on to score 5 goals in 21 league appearances, in a season where Middlesbrough narrowly failed to gain play-off qualification.

Fletcher claimed the number 11 shirt ahead of the 2019–20 season, the first season under new manager Jonathan Woodgate. He scored on the first day of the new season: a 3–3 draw at Luton Town on 2 August. Fletcher managed to push Britt Assombalonga out of the first-team. In January 2020, Fletcher won the Championship Goal of the Month award for December in recognition for his 30-yard volley against West Bromwich Albion, which ended in a 2–0 victory in Middlesbrough's favour. In April 2021, with his contract due to end in June, Middlesbrough manager Neil Warnock confirmed that Fletcher had turned down a new contract on reduced terms and had left the club with immediate effect.

=== Watford ===
On 20 May 2021, it was reported Watford had agreed to sign Fletcher on a free transfer. On 11 June 2021, Fletcher's transfer to Watford was announced, effective from 1 July. He scored his first goal for the club on his debut in an EFL Cup tie against Crystal Palace on 24 August 2021.

On 28 February 2022 he moved to MLS side New York Red Bulls on a six-month loan deal, with an option to purchase. His loan officially ended with New York on 11 July 2022, with Fletcher having made seven appearances for the Red Bulls, scoring no goals.

On 12 August 2022, he joined Wigan Athletic on a season-long loan.

On 25 July 2023, he joined Sheffield Wednesday on a season-long loan. He made his debut against Southampton on 4 August 2023.

He was released by Watford at the end of the 2023–24 season.

=== Blackpool ===
Following his release from Watford, in June 2024 it was announced that he would join Blackpool on 1 July 2024. He made his debut against Crawley Town on 10 August 2024, scoring his side's only goal in a 2–1 defeat.

He was named Blackpool supporters' Player of the Season for the 2024–25 season.

At the end of the 2025–26 season, the club entered into new contract discussions with Fletcher.

=== Huddersfield Town ===
On 11 June 2026, Huddersfield Town confirmed Fletcher had signed a two-year deal on a free transfer, with effect from 1 July.

== International career ==
Born in England, Fletcher is of Jamaican descent. In November 2015, Fletcher made his debut for the England under-20 side, scoring ten minutes after coming on as a substitute. In March 2016, he was called up to face the Canada under-20s, playing up front with his then Manchester United teammate Marcus Rashford, and scored in a 4–1 win.

== Career statistics ==
As of match played 21 November 2026

Appearances and goals by club, season and competition
Club	Season	League			National cup (Note: Includes FA Cup)		League cup (Note: Includes EFL Cup)		Other		Total	
Club	Season	Division	Apps	Goals	Apps	Goals	Apps	Goals	Apps	Goals	Apps	Goals
Manchester United	2015–16	Premier League	0	0	0	0	0	0	0	0	0	0
Barnsley (loan)	2015–16	League One	20	4	—		—		7 (Note: Three appearances and two goals in Football League Trophy, three appearances and two goals in League One play-offs)	4	27	8
West Ham United	2016–17	Premier League	16	0	1	0	1	1	2 (Note: Appearances in Europa League)	0	20	1
Middlesbrough	2017–18	Championship	16	1	0	0	3	1	—		19	2
Middlesbrough	2018–19	Championship	21	5	3	1	5	3	0	0	29	9
Middlesbrough	2019–20	Championship	43	11	2	1	1	1	0	0	46	13
Middlesbrough	2020–21	Championship	11	1	0	0	2	2	0	0	13	3
Middlesbrough	Total		91	18	5	2	11	7	0	0	107	27
Sunderland (loan)	2017–18	Championship	16	2	0	0	0	0	—		16	2
Watford	2021–22	Premier League	3	0	1	0	2	2	0	0	6	2
Watford	2022–23	Championship	0	0	0	0	0	0	0	0	0	0
Watford	2023–24	Championship	0	0	0	0	0	0	0	0	0	0
Watford	Total		3	0	1	0	2	2	0	0	6	2
New York Red Bulls (loan)	2022	Major League Soccer	7	0	0	0	0	0	0	0	7	0
Wigan Athletic (loan)	2022–23	Championship	26	2	2	0	0	0	—		28	2
Sheffield Wednesday (loan)	2023–24	Championship	23	0	3	0	2	0	—		28	0
Blackpool	2024–25	League One	41	11	1	0	2	0	4 (Note: Appearances in EFL Trophy)	0	48	11
Blackpool	2025–26	League One	43	15	3	4	1	0	3	2	50	21
Blackpool	Total		84	26	4	4	3	0	7	2	98	32
Huddersfield Town	2026–27	League One	15	2	1	0	1	0	2	0	19	2
Career total			301	54	17	6	20	10	18	6	356	76

== Honours ==
Barnsley

- Football League One play-offs: 2016
- Football League Trophy: 2015–16
