= Alex Lankshear =

English footballer (born 2002)

Personal information
- Full name: Alex James Lankshear
- Date of birth: 8 September 2002 (age 24)
- Place of birth: Watford, England
- Height: 1.86 m (6 ft 1 in)
- Position: Left-back

Team information
- Current team: Gateshead

Youth career
- Arsenal
- St Albans City

Senior career*
Years	Team	Apps	(Gls)
2021–2022	St Albans City	23	(1)
2022–2025	Blackpool	1	(0)
2023–2024	→ Dorking Wanderers (loan)	1	(0)
2024–2025	→ Welling United (loan)	15	(1)
2025	→ Ebbsfleet United (loan)	14	(1)
2025–2026	Boston United	29	(2)
2026–	Gateshead	11	(1)
- * Club domestic league appearances and goals as of 17:23, 3 October 2026 (UTC)

Alex James Lankshear (born 8 September 2002) is an English professional footballer who plays as a left-back for National League club Gateshead.

== Career ==
=== St Albans City ===
Lankshear attended Beaumont School. He came through the academy at St Albans City to make 37 appearances during the 2021–22 campaign, scoring one goal against Welling United. He signed a first-team contract with St Albans in February 2021.

=== Blackpool ===
On 12 August 2022, Lankshear was signed by Blackpool for an undisclosed fee, agreeing a three-year contract with the option of a further year. He made his first-team debut on the last day of the 2022–23 relegation season, coming on as an 82nd-minute substitute for Jordan Thorniley in a 1–0 victory at Norwich City.

On 27 August 2023, Lankshear joined National League club Dorking Wanderers on loan until January 2024.

He went on loan again in September 2024, to Welling United, until January 2025. On 18 January 2025, he joined National League bottom side Ebbsfleet United on loan for the remainder of the season.

=== Boston United ===
After his contract with Blackpool ended, at the end of the 2024–25 season, Lankshear signed for Boston United on a free transfer, signing a two-year contract.

=== Gateshead ===
In August 2026, Lankshear signed for fellow Enterprise National League team Gateshead. He signed a one-year contract, with the option for an additional year.

== Style of play ==
Lankshear is an attacking left-back.

== Personal life ==
He is the elder brother of the Middlesbrough forward Will Lankshear.

== Career statistics ==
As of match played 3 October 2026

Appearances and goals by club, season and competition
Club	Season	League			FA Cup		EFL Cup		Other		Total	
Club	Season	Division	Apps	Goals	Apps	Goals	Apps	Goals	Apps	Goals	Apps	Goals
St Albans City	2021–22	National League South	23	1	8	0	—		5 (Note: 3 appearances in FA Trophy and 2 appearances in Herts Senior Cup)	0	36	1
Blackpool	2022–23	EFL Championship	1	0	0	0	0	0	0	0	1	0
Blackpool	2023–24	EFL League One	0	0	0	0	0	0	0	0	0	0
Blackpool	2024–25	EFL League One	0	0	0	0	0	0	1 (Note: Appearance in EFL Trophy)	0	1	0
Blackpool	Total		1	0	0	0	0	0	1	0	2	0
Dorking Wanderers (loan)	2023–24	National League	1	0	0	0	—		0	0	1	0
Welling United (loan)	2024–25	National League South	15	1	0	0	—		1 (Note: Appearances in FA Trophy)	1	16	2
Ebbsfleet (loan)	2024–25	National League	14	1	0	0	—		0	0	14	1
Boston United	2025–26	National League	29	2	0	0	—		0	0	29	2
Gateshead	2026–27	National League	11	1	0	0	—		0	0	11	1
Career total			94	6	8	0	0	0	7	1	109	7
