= Kwaku Donkor =

English footballer (born 2004)

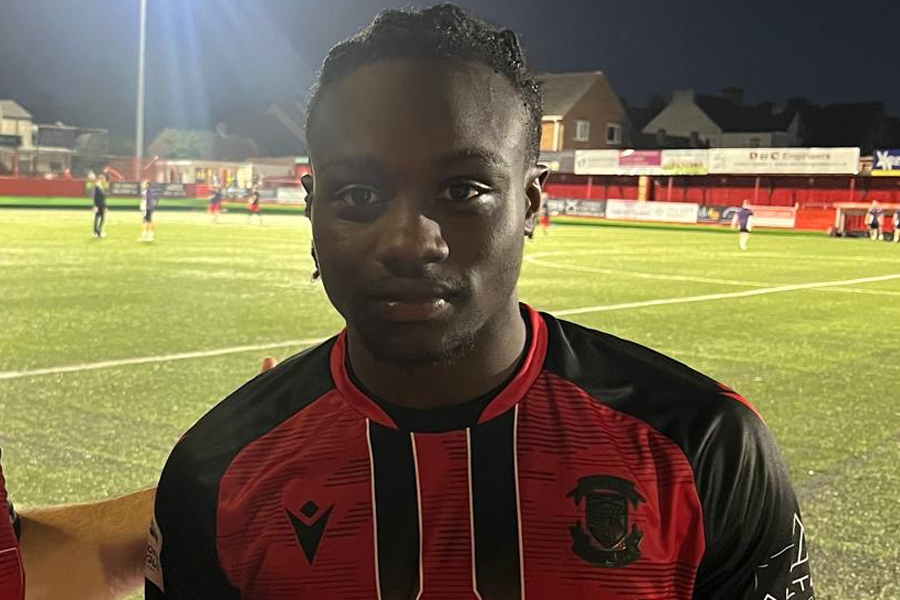
- Donkor in 2025

Personal information
- Full name: Kwaku Poku Agyeman Donkor
- Date of birth: 15 September 2004 (age 22)
- Place of birth: Newham, England
- Position: Right-back

Team information
- Current team: Sutton United
- Number: 2

Youth career
- 2020–2023: Blackpool

Senior career*
Years	Team	Apps	(Gls)
2023–2025	Blackpool	0	(0)
2024	→ Havant & Waterlooville (loan)	14	(0)
2024–2025	→ Welling United (loan)	12	(0)
2025	→ Mickleover (loan)	14	(0)
2025–2026	Tamworth	21	(0)
2026–	Sutton United	0	(0)
- * Club domestic league appearances and goals as of 20:30, 30 January 2026 (UTC)

Kwaku Poku Agyeman Donkor (born 15 September 2004) is an English professional footballer who plays for National League club Sutton United, where he plays as a right-back.

== Early life ==
Donkor was born in England on 15 September 2004. Both of his parents are from Ghana.

== Career ==
Donkor signed a two-year professional contract, plus the option of additional year, with Blackpool in June 2023, having been with the club since moving from London in 2020. He made his senior debut on 5 September, coming on for Jensen Weir in the 62nd minute of a 2–0 win at Barrow in the EFL Trophy. In January 2024, he joined National League South side Havant & Waterlooville on an initial short-term loan, later extended until the end of the season.

On 9 August 2024, Donkor returned to the National League South, joining Welling United on a season-long loan deal. In January 2025, he joined Northern Premier League Premier Division side Mickleover on a one-month loan deal.

He became a free agent following his contract with Blackpool expiring on 30 June 2025.

On 27 July 2025, National League side Tamworth announced the signing of Kwaku following a successful trial period.

Donker signed for fellow National League side Sutton United on 30 January 2026 for an undisclosed fee.

== Career statistics ==
As of 27 January 2026

Appearances and goals by club, season and competition
Club	Season	League			FA Cup		EFL Cup		Other		Total	
Club	Season	Division	Apps	Goals	Apps	Goals	Apps	Goals	Apps	Goals	Apps	Goals
Blackpool	2023–24	League One	0	0	0	0	0	0	3 (Note: Appearances in EFL Trophy)	0	3	0
Blackpool	2024–25	League One	0	0	0	0	0	0	0	0	0	0
Blackpool	Total		0	0	0	0	0	0	3	0	3	0
Havant & Waterlooville (loan)	2023–24	National League South	14	0	0	0	—		0	0	14	0
Welling United (loan)	2024–25	National League South	12	0	1	0	—		1 (Note: Appearance(s) in FA Trophy)	0	14	0
Mickleover (loan)	2024–25	Northern Premier League Premier Division	14	0	0	0	—		0	0	14	0
Tamworth	2025–26	National League	21	0	1	0	—		5 (Note: Appearances in National League Cup)	0	27	0
Sutton United	2025–26	National League	0	0	0	0	—		0	0	0	0
Career total			61	0	2	0	0	0	9	0	72	0
