= 2022–23 Blackpool F.C. season =

English football club season

Blackpool
2022–23 season
- Owner: Simon Sadler
- Head coach: Michael Appleton (until 18 January); Mick McCarthy (19 January to 8 April); Stephen Dobbie (interim; from 8 April)
- Stadium: Bloomfield Road
- Championship: 23rd (relegated to League One)
- FA Cup: Fourth round
- EFL Cup: First round
- Top goalscorer: League: Jerry Yates (14); All: Jerry Yates (15)
Home colours	Away colours	Third colours

The 2022–23 season is Blackpool F.C.'s 114th season in the English Football League, and the club's second-consecutive season in the EFL Championship, the second tier of English professional football. The season covers the period from 1 July 2022 to 30 June 2023.

In addition to the league, the club also competed in the 2022–23 FA Cup, reaching the fourth round (they entered in the third round). They were knocked out of the 2022–23 EFL Cup in the first round.

It was Michael Appleton's first season as head coach. He was sacked on 18 January, and replaced by Mick McCarthy. McCarthy left by mutual consent on 8 April, and was replaced in an interim capacity by Stephen Dobbie.

On 28 April 2023, Blackpool were relegated to League One.

== Pre-season ==
On 4 July 2022, Daniel Grimshaw signed a three-year extension to his contract plus an option for a fourth year. The following day, Oliver Casey was loaned out to Forest Green Rovers for the season. Reece James was loaned to Sheffield Wednesday for the duration of the campaign on 7 July.

16 July saw the club's first signing of the summer, Lewis Fiorini joining on a season-long loan from Manchester City. Three days later, Rhys Williams joined on loan, also for the season, from Liverpool.

On July 21, the Seasiders added one final pre-season fixture against local side AFC Fylde.

The club made its first permanent signing of the summer on 25 July, left back Dominic Thompson joining from Brentford for an undisclosed fee.

Three days later, forward Theo Corbeanu joined on a season-long loan from Wolves.

=== Results ===
Blackpool announced their first pre-season friendly on 16 May, with a trip to Southport scheduled for 2 July. A week later, a second fixture, against Salford City was added. A home match against UEFA Europa League finalists Rangers was next added to the calendar. A friendly against Leeds United, at York City's LNER Stadium on 7 July, was announced on 28 June. A second home pre-season tie against Everton was also part of the preparations.

The club opened their competitive pre-season with a 2–0 win at Southport. The first half was stopped for around ten minutes after young Southport fans baited the visiting fans, and then retreated quickly when a few Blackpool fans made their way into that stand from their own. CJ Hamilton put Blackpool ahead on fifteen minutes with a low strike. Beryly Lubala doubled their advantage eight minutes later with a header.

On 7 July, Blackpool were beaten 4–0 by Leeds United in their friendly, although the Premier League side played a stronger team than Blackpool manager Michael Appleton expected.

Nine days later, they lost 2–1 to Rangers. Bez Lubala got Blackpool's goal, to halve the deficit.

A Jerry Yates goal gave the Seasiders a victory at Salford City on 19 July.

Frank Lampard brought his Everton team to the seaside on 24 July. The Toffees won 4–2.

Pre-season was rounded off with a 2–0 win at AFC Fylde. Jerry Yates and Beryly Lubala got the goals.

Win Draw Loss Fixtures

2 July 2022 Friendly	Southport	0–2	Blackpool	Blowick
15:00 BST		Report	Hamilton 15'; Lubala 23'	Stadium: Haig Avenue; Attendance: 1,451

7 July 2022 Friendly	Leeds United	4–0	Blackpool	York
19:00 BST	Koch 10'; Firpo 22'; Rodrigo 30'; Joseph 85'	Report		Stadium: LNER Stadium

16 July 2022 Friendly	Blackpool	1–2	Rangers	Blackpool
15:00 BST		Report		Stadium: Bloomfield Road

19 July 2022 Friendly	Salford City	0–1	Blackpool	Salford
19:30 BST			Yates	Stadium: Peninsula Stadium

24 July 2022 Friendly	Blackpool	2–4	Everton	Blackpool
15:00 BST	Madine 44'; Connolly 51'	Report	Mykolenko 6'; Davies 11'; Alli 48', 64'	Stadium: Bloomfield Road

26 July 2022 Friendly	AFC Fylde	0–2	Blackpool	Medlar-with-Wesham
19:30 BST		Report	Yates; Lubala	Stadium: Mill Farm

3 December 2022 Friendly	Blackpool	0–0	St Mirren	Blackpool
15:00 GMT		Report		Stadium: Bloomfield Road

== Season proper ==
=== July ===
On 30 July, Blackpool hosted Reading. A Callum Connolly goal was the difference, giving the Seasiders an opening-day three points.

=== August ===
On 2 August, midfielder Donovan Lescott signed for the club from Salford City for an undisclosed fee. The following day, another midfielder, Charlie Patino, joined on season-long loan from Arsenal.

Blackpool travelled to Stoke City on 6 August, and were defeated 2–0.

Barrow visited the seaside in the EFL Cup three days later. The match went to extra-time after finishing goalless. No scoring ensued, and the visitors won the resulting penalty shootout.

Defender Richard Keogh departed the seaside for Ipswich Town on 10 August, while left-back Alex Lankshear joined from St Albans City on 12 August.

Back in the league, on 13 August, Blackpool lost at home to Swansea City by virtue of an 87th-minute strike.

Blackpool faced Queens Park Rangers at Loftus Road on 16 August, and returned home with all three points after Josh Bowler's goal in first-half injury time.

On 20 August, Blackpool met Burnley in the league for the first time in nine years. The Clarets went two goals up inside twelve minutes, before Theo Corbeanu got his first goal for Blackpool midway through the first half. Burnley restored their two-goal advantage on 33 minutes. Shayne Lavery opened his goalscoring account for the season, with sixteen minutes remaining, to make it 3–2. Jerry Yates levelled matters two minutes later, also with his first goal of the campaign. Sonny Carey was sent off for the visitors with six minutes of normal time remaining. With the point, their seventh from a possible fifteen, Blackpool sat in eleventh place in the Championship.

Another 3–3 draw followed on 27 August against Bristol City at Bloomfield Road. Josh Bowler opened the scoring, while Blackpool's other goals came from Jerry Yates and Theo Corbeanu for the second-successive game. Blackpool sat in thirteenth place. Earlier in the day, attacking midfielder Ian Poveda joined on a season-long loan from Leeds United.

A single-goal defeat to Lancashire rivals Blackburn Rovers ended August's fixtures. Blackpool had played eight league games, winning three, drawing two and losing three.

On 30 August, Scottish winger Owen Moffat joined the club from Celtic for an undisclosed fee.

=== September ===
The second full month of the campaign began with two new signings: forward Zak Emmerson from Brighton & Hove Albion and midfielder Callum Wright from Leicester City, both for undisclosed fees. Winger Josh Bowler, meanwhile, departed the club for Nottingham Forest. Also leaving, on loan, were forward Ewan Bange (to Queen of the South until January) and midfielder Matty Virtue (to Lincoln City until the end of the campaign).

On 4 September, Blackpool secured a 1–0 victory at Huddersfield Town. Theo Corbeanu, with his third goal of the season, gave the visitors the three points, lifting them to eleventh in the table.

After a postponement of the planned 10 September home fixture with Middlesbrough, Blackpool lost 3–0 at Rotherham United four days later.

On 17 September, Blackpool lost 2–1 at Millwall, leaving the club 19th in the table before a two-week international break.

Free-agent midfielder Liam Bridcutt signed for the club on 30 September. He had been a free agent since leaving Lincoln City, where he had played under Michael Appleton.

=== October ===
A third-successive defeat followed on 1 October, 1–0 at home to Norwich City. A Dominic Thompson own-goal was the difference. Blackpool remained 19th, with eleven points from as many games.

A goalless draw at Sunderland on 4 October was followed by a 3–1 victory over Watford at Bloomfield Road, with Jerry Yates scoring twice. Blackpool remained 19th.

Blackpool travelled to Bramall Lane to face Sheffield United on 15 October, and left with a point after a 3–3 draw. The visitors' goals came from Jerry Yates (2) and Kenny Dougall. Three players were sent off, including Blackpool's Marvin Ekpiteta and Dominic Thompson.

Hull City were victorious in their visit to Bloomfield Road on 19 October. Blackpool's goal in the 1–3 scoreline came from Kenny Dougall.

The following day, Blackpool beat Preston North End 4–2 in the 97th West Lancashire derby. Jerry Yates scored his third brace in four games, while Charlie Patino and CJ Hamilton also found the net. Blackpool climbed three places to eighteenth with the three points.

Seven days later, Blackpool closed out the month with a second-successive victory, 2–1 at Coventry City. Jerry Yates (seven goals in five games) and Gary Madine scored the goals for the visitors, who climbed another three places, to fifteenth, with the victory.

=== November ===
A single-goal defeat at West Bromwich Albion on 1 November dropped Blackpool one place to sixteenth.

A third defeat in five games ensued, 1–0 at home to Luton Town.

Middlesbrough inflicted a third-straight defeat as Blackpool dropped to 21st in the table.

A fourth followed at Wigan Athletic on 12 November, dropping the Seasiders to second from bottom.

=== December ===
Three consecutive draws — at home to Birmingham City and away to Cardiff City and Hull City — began the month.

A home defeat to Sheffield United rounded out the year.

=== January ===
Full-back Andy Lyons completed his move from Shamrock Rovers on New Year's Day. On the same day, the Seasiders achieved a 1–1 draw at home to Sunderland. Callum Connolly was sent off in injury time for a second booking.

Midfielder Callum Wright joined Plymouth Argyle for an undisclosed fee on 4 January, while Morgan Rogers signed on loan from Manchester City until the end of the season.

After an unsuccessful loan to Olympiacos, winger Josh Bowler returned to the seaside on loan from Nottingham Forest until the end of the campaign.

On 11 January, German midfielder Tom Trybull joined the club on a free transfer from SV Sandhausen.

A 2–0 defeat at Watford on 14 January, leaving Blackpool second-bottom, was Michael Appleton's final game in charge. After one win in eleven games, he was sacked, and replaced by Mick McCarthy.

McCarthy's planned first game in charge, at home to Huddersfield Town on 21 January, was postponed due to a frozen pitch. Grant Ward was released to free agency later in the day.

Central defender Charlie Goode signed on loan from Brentford on 23 January.

Blackpool were knocked out of the FA Cup by Southampton at the fourth-round stage on 28 January. Earlier in the day, the club signed defender Curtis Nelson from Cardiff City on a free transfer.

Forward Ewan Bange joined Radcliffe on a free transfer on 31 January.

=== February ===
A 3–0 defeat at Middlesbrough meant Blackpool had lost seven of their last eleven games.

Two draws at home followed, against Huddersfield Town and Rotherham United, the latter result, a goalless draw, leaving Blackpool bottom of the table, after Wigan Athletic picked up three points.

On 15 February, Blackpool lost 2–1 at Swansea City.

Three days later, Blackpool beat Stoke City by a single goal at Bloomfield Road, Ian Poveda with the strike. It was their first win in the league since 29 October, and lifted them off the bottom of the table, on goal difference, at the expense of Wigan Athletic.

A single-goal defeat followed at Blackburn Rovers on 21 February. Blackpool sat 23rd in the table.

February was closed out with a tenth defeat in seventeen games. Blackpool remained 23rd, four points adrift of safety, but bottom club Wigan Athletic had a game in hand.

=== March ===
A goalless draw at home to Burnley on 5 March was followed six days later by a 2–0 defeat at Bristol City.

An eighth victory of the campaign occurred on 14 March, with a 6–1 scoreline at home to Queens Park Rangers. Andy Lyons scored a brace.

This was followed by a 4–1 home defeat by Coventry City.

=== April ===
On 1 April, Preston won the West Lancashire derby 3–1.

Six days later, a 3–1 home defeat to Cardiff City, a sixth defeat in eight games and a third-consecutive loss, sealed Mick McCarthy's fate. He left the club by mutual consent the following day. Blackpool appointed Stephen Dobbie as interim head coach until the end of the season.

A fourth-straight defeat followed at Luton Town on 10 April. 3–1 was the scoreline, with Andy Lyons getting Blackpool's goal.

On 15 April, Blackpool beat fellow relegation candidates Wigan Athletic by a single goal.

This was followed three days later by a 2–0 home defeat by West Bromwich Albion.

Blackpool travelled to Birmingham City on 22 April, and an Ian Poveda goal on 74 minutes proved decisive. With two games remaining, Blackpool sat second-bottom, one point above Wigan Athletic and two points behind Reading.

A 3–2 home defeat to Millwall confirmed Blackpool's relegation to League One after two seasons in the Championship.

=== May ===
On 3 May, Simon Sadler announced that chief executive officer Ben Mansford, who joined the club with the owner in 2019, would be leaving the club to pursue new opportunities.

Five days later, Blackpool ended the season with a single-goal victory at Norwich City, with Morgan Rogers scoring the goal in the fifteenth minute.

After 46 league fixtures, Blackpool had picked up 44 points from a possible 138.

On 16 May, the club announced its retained list for the following season. Released were goalkeepers Chris Maxwell and Stuart Moore, defenders Luke Garbutt, Curtis Nelson and Jordan Thorniley, midfielders Keshi Anderson, Kevin Stewart and Liam Bridcutt, and forwards Beryly Lubala and Gary Madine. Contract extensions were triggered on defenders Callum Connolly and James Husband, midfielders Kenny Dougall, CJ Hamilton, Luke Mariette, Tayt Trusty and Matty Virtue, and forwards Shayne Lavery and Will Squires.

== Competitions ==
=== League One ===
==== League table ====
Pos	Team	Pld	W	D	L	GF	GA	GD	Pts	Promotion, qualification or relegation
19	Rotherham United	46	11	17	18	49	60	−11	50	
20	Queens Park Rangers	46	13	11	22	44	71	−27	50	
21	Cardiff City	46	13	10	23	41	58	−17	49	
22	Reading (R)	46	13	11	22	46	68	−22	44 (Note: Reading were deducted 6 points for breaching an EFL business plan.)	Relegation to League One
23	Blackpool (R)	46	11	11	24	48	72	−24	44	Relegation to League One
24	Wigan Athletic (R)	46	10	15	21	38	65	−27	39 (Note: Wigan Athletic received a 3 point deduction in March 2023 after breaching a suspended sentence for late wage payments, followed by a further 3 point penalty in May 2023 for paying players late.)	Relegation to League One

Source: EFL Official Website
Rules for classification: 1) Points; 2) Goal difference; 3) Number of goals scored; 4) Head-to-head results; 5) Wins; 6) Away goals; 7) Penalty points (sec 9.5); 8) 12-point sending off offences
(R) Relegated

===== Results summary =====
Overall								Home						Away					
Pld	W	D	L	GF	GA	GD	Pts	W	D	L	GF	GA	GD	W	D	L	GF	GA	GD
46	11	11	24	48	72	−24	44	6	6	11	28	34	−6	5	5	13	20	38	−18

Last updated: 8 May 2023.

===== Matches =====
Win Draw Loss Fixtures

On 23 June, the league fixtures were announced.

30 July 2022 1	Blackpool	1–0	Reading	Blackpool
15:00 BST	Connolly 9'; Dougall (yellow card) 78'	Report		Stadium: Bloomfield Road; Attendance: 10,831; Referee: David Webb

6 August 2022 2	Stoke City	2–0	Blackpool	Stoke-on-Trent
15:00 BST	Clarke 33'; Baker (yellow card) 74'; Brown 75'; Laurent (yellow card) 90+5'	Report	Dougall (yellow card) 78'; Connolly (yellow card) 90+2'	Stadium: Bet365 Stadium; Attendance: 23,612 (1,512 away); Referee: Bobby Madley

13 August 2022 3	Blackpool	0–1	Swansea City	Blackpool
15:00 BST	Lavery (yellow card) 47'; Yates (penalty missed) 50'	Report	Grimes (yellow card) 63'; Ntcham (yellow card) 77', (goal) 87'; Allen (yellow card) 90+3'	Stadium: Bloomfield Road; Attendance: 11,519; Referee: Andy Woolmer

16 August 2022 4	Queens Park Rangers	0–1	Blackpool	London
15:00 BST		Report	Bowler 45+1'	Stadium: Loftus Road; Attendance: 12,575 (525 away); Referee: Andy Davies

20 August 2022 5	Burnley	3–3	Blackpool	Burnley
15:00 BST	Brownhill 3'; Tella 11', 33'; Cullen (yellow card) 47'; Maatsen (red card) 85'	Report	Corbeanu 21'; Thompson (yellow card) 45+1'; Connolly (yellow card) 61'; Lavery 74'; Yates 76'; Carey (red card) 84'; Dougall (yellow card) 90+5'	Stadium: Turf Moor; Attendance: 20,620 (2,197 away); Referee: Keith Stroud

27 August 2022 6	Blackpool	3–3	Bristol City	Blackpool
15:00 BST	Bowler 7'; Yates 55'; Lawrence-Gabriel (yellow card) 65'; Corbeanu 90'	Report	Conway 44'; Scott (yellow card) 51'; Semenyo 63', (yellow card) 77'; Ekpiteta 70' (o.g.); Atkinson (yellow card) 85'; Williams (yellow card) 87'; King (yellow card) 90+3'	Stadium: Bloomfield Road; Attendance: 10,804; Referee: Jeremy Simpson

31 August 2022 7	Blackpool	0–1	Blackburn Rovers	Blackpool
19:45 BST	Thompson (yellow card) 63'; Ekpiteta (yellow card) 84'	Report	Brereton Díaz 16', (yellow card) 24'; Travis (yellow card) 70'; Vale (yellow card) 73'	Stadium: Bloomfield Road; Attendance: 13,383; Referee: Matt Donohue

4 September 2022 8	Huddersfield Town	0–1	Blackpool	Huddersfield
15:00 BST		Report	Corbeanu 38'; Connolly (yellow card) 58'; Williams (yellow card) 63'; Yates (yellow card) 65'	Stadium: The John Smith's Stadium; Attendance: 18,195; Referee: John Busby

10 September 2022	Blackpool	Postponed	Middlesbrough	Blackpool
15:00 BST				Stadium: Bloomfield Road
Note: Fixture was postponed as a mark of respect following the passing of Queen Elizabeth II.

14 September 2022 9	Rotherham United	3–0	Blackpool	Rotherham
19:45 BST	Ogbene 34'; Rathbone (yellow card) 73'; Harding 82'; Kelly 85'	Report	Thorniley (yellow card) 80'	Stadium: New York Stadium; Attendance: 9,105 (698 away); Referee: Michael Salisbury

17 September 2022 10	Millwall	2–1	Blackpool	Bermondsey
15:00 BST	Cooper (yellow card) 7'; Grimshaw 14' (o.g.); Afobe 63'; Wallace (yellow card) 68'	Report	Patino 33', (yellow card) 60'; Corbeanu (yellow card) 90+1'	Stadium: The Den; Attendance: 11,463 (515 away); Referee: Darren Bond

1 October 2022 11	Blackpool	0–1	Norwich City	Blackpool
15:00 BST	Lawrence-Gabriel (yellow card) 10'; Dougall (yellow card) 39'; Ekpiteta (yellow card) 90+2'	Report	Pukki 21'	Stadium: Bloomfield Road; Attendance: 11,594; Referee: David Coote

4 October 2022 12	Sunderland	0–0	Blackpool	Sunderland
19:45 BST	Michut (yellow card) 85'	Report	Patino (yellow card) 56'; Thorniley (yellow card) 64'; Dougall (yellow card) 83'	Stadium: Stadium of Light; Attendance: 35,900 (524 away); Referee: Jeremy Simpson

8 October 2022 13	Blackpool	3–1	Watford	Blackpool
15:00 BST	Madine 10'; Thompson (yellow card) 51'; Yates 81' 85'	Report	Louza 29' (yellow card) 88'	Stadium: Bloomfield Road; Attendance: 11,567; Referee: Bobby Madley

15 October 2022 14	Sheffield United	3–3	Blackpool	Sheffield
15:00 BST	McAtee 8' (yellow card) 45+1'; Ndiaye 24'; Baldock (yellow card) 56'; Ahmedhodžić (yellow card) 72'; Norwood (yellow card) 72' (goal) 90+8'; Doyle (yellow card) 77'; Brewster (penalty missed) 88'; Foderingham (red card) 90+9'	Report	Yates 30' 42'; Dougall 50'; Ekpiteta (yellow card) 55' (yellow-red card) 78'; Thompson (yellow card) 66' (yellow-red card) 81'	Stadium: Bramall Lane; Attendance: 28,458 (1,466 away); Referee: David Webb

19 October 2022 15	Blackpool	1–3	Hull City	Blackpool
19:45 BST	Dougall 31'; Wright (yellow card) 45+2'; Madine (yellow card) 48'; Connolly (yellow card) 81'	Report	Longman 26' (yellow card) 38'; Slater (yellow card) 43' (goal) 79'; Docherty 45+3'; Greaves (yellow card) 51'; Pelkas (yellow card) 78'	Stadium: Bloomfield Road; Attendance: 9,884; Referee: Josh Smith

22 October 2022 16	Blackpool	4–2	Preston North End	Blackpool
12:30 BST	Yates 30' 81'; Patino (yellow card) 45+1' (goal) 68'; Hamilton 90+5'	Report	Fernández (yellow card) 27'; Whiteman 38' (pen.); Storey (yellow card) 45'; Connolly 89' (o.g.)	Stadium: Bloomfield Road; Attendance: 13,632; Referee: Chris Kavanagh

29 October 2022 17	Coventry City	1–2	Blackpool	Coventry
15:00 BST	Sheaf (yellow card) 13'; Palmer 40'	Report	Madine 53' (yellow card) 90+3'; Dougall (yellow card) 56'; Patino (yellow card) 65'; Yates 80' (yellow card) 90+3'	Stadium: The Coventry Building Society Arena; Attendance: 18,924 (867 away); Referee: Darren Bond

1 November 2022 18	West Bromwich Albion	1–0	Blackpool	West Bromwich
20:00 BST	O'Shea (yellow card) 51'; Bartley (yellow card) 52'; Wallace (yellow card) 58'; Yokuşlu 85' (yellow card) 90+4'	Report	Thorniley (yellow card) 28'; Yates (yellow card) 47'	Stadium: The Hawthorns; Attendance: 19,786 (608 away); Referee: Gavin Ward

5 November 2022 19	Blackpool	0–1	Luton Town	Blackpool
3:00 BST	Connolly (yellow card) 51'	Report	Berry 57' (yellow card) 64'	Stadium: Bloomfield Road; Attendance: 11,452; Referee: Tim Robinson

8 November 2022 20	Blackpool	0–3	Middlesbrough	Blackpool
19:45 GMT	Husband (yellow card) 7'; Thompson (yellow card) 34'; Maxwell (yellow card) 47'; Corbeanu (yellow card) 52'	Report	Jones 15'; Forss 48' (pen.); Akpom 65'; Hackney (yellow card) 90+4'	Stadium: Bloomfield Road; Attendance: 12,191; Referee: Jeremy Simpson

12 November 2022 21	Wigan Athletic	2–1	Blackpool	Wigan
15:00 GMT	Lang (yellow card) 45+4'; McClean 54'; Bennett (yellow card) 80'; Shinnie (yellow card) 84'; Tilt 88'	Report	Ekpiteta (red card) 17'; Madine 34'; Carey (yellow card) 58'; Thompson (yellow card) 90+1'	Stadium: DW Stadium; Attendance: 14,059 (3,613 away); Referee: Andy Davies

10 December 2022 22	Blackpool	0–0	Birmingham City	Blackpool
15:00 GMT		Report	Mejbri (yellow card) 80'	Stadium: Bloomfield Road; Attendance: 12,854; Referee: Thomas Bramall

17 December 2022 23	Cardiff City	1–1	Blackpool	Leckwith
15:00 GMT	Robinson (yellow card) 15'; Etete 36'; O'Dowda (yellow card) 41'; Whyte (yellow card) 47'	Report	Madine (yellow card) 51', (goal) 67'; Patino (yellow card) 62'; Williams (yellow card) 88'	Stadium: Cardiff City Stadium; Attendance: 17,544; Referee: Josh Smith

26 December 2022 24	Hull City	1–1	Blackpool	Kingston upon Hull
15:00 GMT	Seri (yellow card) 47'; Estupiñán 77'; Greaves (yellow card) 86'	Report	Garbutt (yellow card) 21'; Carey 28'; Thorniley (red card) 53'; Grimshaw (yellow card) 90+3'	Stadium: MKM Stadium; Attendance: 19,170; Referee: John Brooks

29 December 2022 25	Blackpool	1–2	Sheffield United	Blackpool
20:15 GMT	Ekpiteta 55'	Report	Berge 18'; McAtee 49'	Stadium: Bloomfield Road; Attendance: 14,395; Referee: Peter Bankes

1 January 2023 26	Blackpool	1–1	Sunderland	Blackpool
15:00 GMT	Connolly (yellow card) 8' (yellow-red card) 90+2'; Lavery 21', (yellow card) 71'; Poveda (yellow card) 28'; Beesley (yellow card) 85'	Report	Michut (yellow card) 19'; Stewart 66'; O'Nien (yellow card) 72'	Stadium: Bloomfield Road; Attendance: 14,117; Referee: Tim Robinson

14 January 2023 27	Watford	2–0	Blackpool	Watford
15:00 GMT	Gaspar (yellow card) 41'; Ferreira (yellow card) 64'; Adeyemo 72'; Sarr 87' (pen.)	Report	Husband (yellow card) 86'; Maxwell (yellow card) 86'; Patino (yellow card) 88'	Stadium: Vicarage Road; Attendance: 19,679 (1,363 away); Referee: Gavin Ward

21 January 2023	Blackpool	Postponed	Huddersfield Town	Blackpool
15:00 GMT				Stadium: Bloomfield Road
Note: Fixture was postponed following a PGMOL pitch inspection.

4 February 2023 28	Middlesbrough	3–0	Blackpool	Middlesbrough
15:00 GMT	Hackney (yellow card) 7'; Akpom 32', 59'; McNair 69'	Report	Yates (yellow card) 26'; Madine (yellow card) 79'	Stadium: Riverside Stadium; Attendance: 26,299 (822 away); Referee: Tim Robinson

7 February 2023 29	Blackpool	2–2	Huddersfield Town	Blackpool
19:45 GMT	Madine (red card) 45+4'; Lyons 82'; Dougall (yellow card) 84'; Bowler 90'	Report	High (yellow card) 28'; Pearson 36'; Rudoni (yellow card) 45+2'; Koroma 86'; Knockaert (yellow card) 87'	Stadium: Bloomfield Road; Attendance: 11,164; Referee: Graham Scott

11 February 2023 30	Blackpool	0–0	Rotherham United	Blackpool
15:00 GMT	Dougall (yellow card) 81'	Report		Stadium: Bloomfield Road; Attendance: 12,262; Referee: Josh Smith

15 February 2023 31	Swansea City	2–1	Blackpool	Landore
19:45 GMT	Sorinola 21'; Darling (yellow card) 49'; Connolly 73' (o.g.); Manning (yellow card) 81'	Report	Connolly (yellow card) 1'; Patino (yellow card) 39' (yellow-red card) 57'; Carey 70'	Stadium: Swansea.com Stadium; Attendance: 15,345 (158 away); Referee: Geoff Eltringham

18 February 2023 32	Blackpool	1–0	Stoke City	Blackpool
15:00 GMT	Poveda 7', (yellow card) 27'; Dougall (yellow card) 24'; Thompson (yellow card) 81'; Husband (yellow card) 86'	Report	Wilmot (yellow card) 90+3'	Stadium: Bloomfield Road; Attendance: 13,238; Referee: Matt Donohue

21 February 2023 33	Blackburn Rovers	1–0	Blackpool	Blackburn
19:45 GMT	Dolan 31', (yellow card) 49'; Brittain (yellow card) 80'; Buckley (yellow card) 90'	Report		Stadium: Ewood Park; Attendance: 14,483 (2,631 away); Referee: Dean Whitestone

25 February 2023 34	Reading	3–1	Blackpool	Reading
15:00 GMT	Ince 13', 72'; Mbengue (yellow card) 57'; Carroll 70' (pen.)	Report	Carey 90+4'	Stadium: Select Car Leasing Stadium; Attendance: 17,013 (597 away); Referee: John Brooks

5 March 2023 35	Blackpool	0–0	Burnley	Blackpool
15:00 GMT	Connolly (yellow card) 44'	Report	Tella (yellow card) 79'	Stadium: Bloomfield Road; Attendance: 14,134; Referee: Thomas Bramall

11 March 2023 36	Bristol City	2–0	Blackpool	Ashton Gate
12:30 GMT	Weimann 58'; Scott 81'	Report	Rogers (yellow card) 75'	Stadium: Ashton Gate Stadium; Attendance: 19,070 (416 away); Referee: Darren Bond

14 March 2023 37	Blackpool	6–1	Queens Park Rangers	Blackpool
19:45 GMT	Yates 3' (pen.), (yellow card) 65'; Lyons 11', 48'; Nelson 14'; Thorniley 36'; Dougall 88'	Report	Martin 43'; Dunne (yellow card) 45'; Amos (yellow card) 75'; Dickie (yellow card) 87'	Stadium: Bloomfield Road; Attendance: 10,051; Referee: Dean Whitestone

18 March 2023 38	Blackpool	1–4	Coventry City	Blackpool
15:00 GMT	Yates 35' (pen.)	Report	Gyökeres (yellow card) 14'; Sheaf 20'; McFadzean (yellow card) 34', (goal) 50'; Nelson 45+2' (o.g.); Godden 73'; Hamer (yellow card) 83'	Stadium: Bloomfield Road; Attendance: 14,055; Referee: Geoff Eltringham

1 April 2023 39	Preston North End	3–1	Blackpool	Preston
12:30 BST	Potts 12', (yellow card) 15'; Lindsay (yellow card) 21'; Whiteman 26'; Cannon 51'; Johnson (yellow card) 74'	Report	Connolly (yellow card) 76'; Patino (yellow card) 82'; Yates 89'; Nelson (yellow card) 90+2'	Stadium: Deepdale; Attendance: 18,834 (2,196 away); Referee: Andre Marriner

7 April 2023 40	Blackpool	1–3	Cardiff City	Blackpool
15:00 BST	Patino (yellow card) 25'; Bowler 74'; Connolly (yellow card) 76'	Report	Wickham 21'; Kaba 37'; Ralls 40'; Philogene (yellow card) 67'	Stadium: Bloomfield Road; Attendance: 13,462; Referee: Josh Smith

10 April 2023 41	Luton Town	3–1	Blackpool	Luton
15:00 BST	Mpanzu 45+2', 76'; Morris 72', (yellow card) 81'	Report	Lyons 29'; Thorniley (yellow card) 42'; Fiorini (yellow card) 47'	Stadium: Kenilworth Road; Attendance: 9,772 (493 away); Referee: Andy Davies

15 April 2023 42	Blackpool	1–0	Wigan Athletic	Blackpool
15:00 BST	Yates 2'; Anderson (yellow card) 90+7'	Report	Lang (yellow card) 66'; Pearce (yellow card) 90+7'	Stadium: Bloomfield Road; Attendance: 12,027; Referee: Thomas Bramall

18 April 2023 43	Blackpool	0–2	West Bromwich Albion	Blackpool
19:45 BST	Fiorini (yellow card) 63'	Report	Thomas-Asante 18'; Chalobah (yellow card) 32'; Furlong (yellow card) 55'; Gardner-Hickman 60'; Albrighton (yellow card) 80'	Stadium: Bloomfield Road; Attendance: 10,705; Referee: Stephen Martin

22 April 2023 44	Birmingham City	0–1	Blackpool	Bordesley
15:00 BST	Roberts (yellow card) 22'	Report	Lyons (yellow card) 44'; Poveda 74'	Stadium: St Andrew's Stadium; Attendance: 16,636 (464 away); Referee: Keith Stroud

28 April 2023 45	Blackpool	2–3	Millwall	Blackpool
20:00 BST	Yates 36' (pen.); Fiorini 67'; Rogers (yellow card) 90+7'	Report	Bradshaw 2', 59', (yellow card) 72'; Flemming (yellow card) 24', (goal) 75' (pen.); Cooper (yellow card) 26'; Saville (yellow card) 32'	Stadium: Bloomfield Road; Attendance: 12,191; Referee: Matt Donohue

8 May 2023 46	Norwich City	0–1	Blackpool	Norwich
15:00 BST	Hernández (yellow card) 73'	Report	Rogers 15'	Stadium: Carrow Road; Attendance: 26,147 (475 away); Referee: James Bell

==== FA Cup ====
The Seasiders were drawn at home to Nottingham Forest in the third round and away to Southampton in the fourth round.

Win Draw Loss Fixtures

7 January 2023 Third round	Blackpool	4–1	Nottingham Forest	Blackpool
15:00 GMT	Ekpiteta 17'; Poveda 64', (yellow card) 64'; Hamilton 71'; Yates 87'	Report	Colback (yellow card) 45'; Johnson (yellow card) 80'; Yates 90+2'	Stadium: Bloomfield Road; Attendance: 8,750; Referee: James Linington

28 January 2023 Fourth round	Southampton	2–1	Blackpool	Southampton
15:00 GMT	Mara (yellow card) 10'; Perraud 22', 62'; Diallo (yellow card) 90+4'	Report	Hamilton (yellow card) 20'; Patino 67'; Dougall (yellow card) 80'	Stadium: St Mary's Stadium; Attendance: 20,665; Referee: Craig Pawson

==== EFL Cup ====
Win Draw Loss Fixtures

Blackpool were drawn at home to Barrow in the first round.

9 August 2022 First round	Blackpool	0–0 (a.e.t.) (3–4 p)	Barrow	Blackpool
19:45 BST		Report		Stadium: Bloomfield Road; Attendance: 4,972; Referee: Ben Speedie

== Transfers ==
=== In ===
Date	Pos.	Player	From	Fee	Ref
25 July 2022	LB	(England) Dominic Thompson	Brentford	Undisclosed	
2 August 2022	MF	(England) Donovan Lescott	Salford City	Undisclosed	
12 August 2022	LB	(England) Alex Lankshear	St Albans City	Undisclosed	
30 August 2022	LW	(Scotland) Owen Moffat	(Scotland) Celtic	Undisclosed	
1 September 2022	CF	(England) Zak Emmerson	Brighton & Hove Albion	Undisclosed	
1 September 2022	CM	(England) Callum Wright	Leicester City	Undisclosed	
30 September 2022	CM	(Scotland) Liam Bridcutt	Free agency	–	
21 October 2022	RM	(England) Grant Ward	Free agency	–	
1 January 2023	RB	(Republic of Ireland) Andy Lyons	(Republic of Ireland) Shamrock Rovers	Undisclosed	
11 January 2023	DM	(Germany) Tom Trybull	(Germany) Sandhausen	–	
28 January 2023	CB	(England) Curtis Nelson	(Wales) Cardiff City	–	

=== Out ===
Date	Pos.	Player	To	Fee	Ref
30 June 2022	CM	(England) Cameron Antwi	Released		
30 June 2022	CB	(England) Ryan Grant	Released		
30 June 2022	FW	(England) Johnny Johnston	Released		
30 June 2022	MF	(England) Matthew Liptrott	Released		
30 June 2022	GK	(England) Charlie Monks	Released		
30 June 2022	CM	(England) Ethan Robson	Released		
30 June 2022	MF	(England) Sky Sinclair	Released		
30 June 2022	RM	(England) Grant Ward	Released		
10 August 2022	CB	(Republic of Ireland) Richard Keogh	Ipswich Town	Undisclosed	
1 September 2022	RW	(England) Josh Bowler	Nottingham Forest	Undisclosed	
4 January 2023	CM	(England) Callum Wright	Plymouth Argyle	Undisclosed	
21 January 2023	RM	(England) Grant Ward	Released		
31 January 2023	CF	(England) Ewan Bange	Radcliffe	–	

=== Loans in ===
Date	Pos.	Player	From	Until	Ref
16 July 2022	MF	(Scotland) Lewis Fiorini	Manchester City	End of season	
19 July 2022	DF	(England) Rhys Williams	Liverpool	23 January 2023 (Note: On 23 January, Williams' loan from Liverpool ended early)	
28 July 2022	FW	(Canada) Theo Corbeanu	Wolverhampton Wanderers	3 January 2023 (Note: On 3 January, Corbeanu was recalled to Wolverhampton)	
3 August 2022	MF	(England) Charlie Patino	Arsenal	End of season	
27 August 2022	MF	(England) Ian Poveda	Leeds United	End of season	
4 January 2023	LW	(England) Morgan Rogers	Manchester City	End of season	
5 January 2023	RW	(England) Josh Bowler	Nottingham Forest	End of season	
23 January 2023	CB	(England) Charlie Goode	Brentford	End of season	

=== Loans out ===
Date	Pos.	Player	To	Until	Ref
5 July 2022	CB	(England) Oliver Casey	Forest Green Rovers	End of season	
7 July 2022	LB	(England) Reece James	Sheffield Wednesday	End of season	
6 August 2022	CF	(England) Brad Holmes	AFC Fylde	4 September 2022	
7 August 2022	RW	(England) Owen Dale	Portsmouth	End of season	
12 August 2022	LB	(England) Harvey Hughes	Bamber Bridge	9 September 2022	
12 August 2022	AM	(England) Tayt–Lemar Trusty	Hyde United	9 September 2022	
15 August 2022	CB	(England) Doug Tharme	Accrington Stanley	End of season	
28 August 2022	RW	(Scotland) Rob Apter	Scunthorpe United	2 January 2023	
30 August 2022	LW	(Democratic Republic of the Congo) Beryly Lubala	Colchester United	3 January 2023 (Note: On 3 January, Lubala returned after his loan at Colchester was cut short)	
1 September 2022	CF	(England) Ewan Bange	(Scotland) Queen of the South	8 January 2023	
1 September 2022	CM	(England) Matty Virtue	Lincoln City	End of season	
23 September 2022	CF	(England) Brad Holmes	Hyde United	January 2023	
5 November 2022	MF	(England) Donovan Lescott	Bamber Bridge	5 December 2022	
27 January 2023	RB	(England) Jack Moore	Chorley	24 February 2023	
27 January 2023	AM	(England) Tayt-Lemar Trusty	Hartlepool United	End of season	
18 March 2023	GK	(England) Stuart Moore	Doncaster Rovers	25 March 2023	
