= 2022–23 FA Cup =

Football Association Challenge Cup
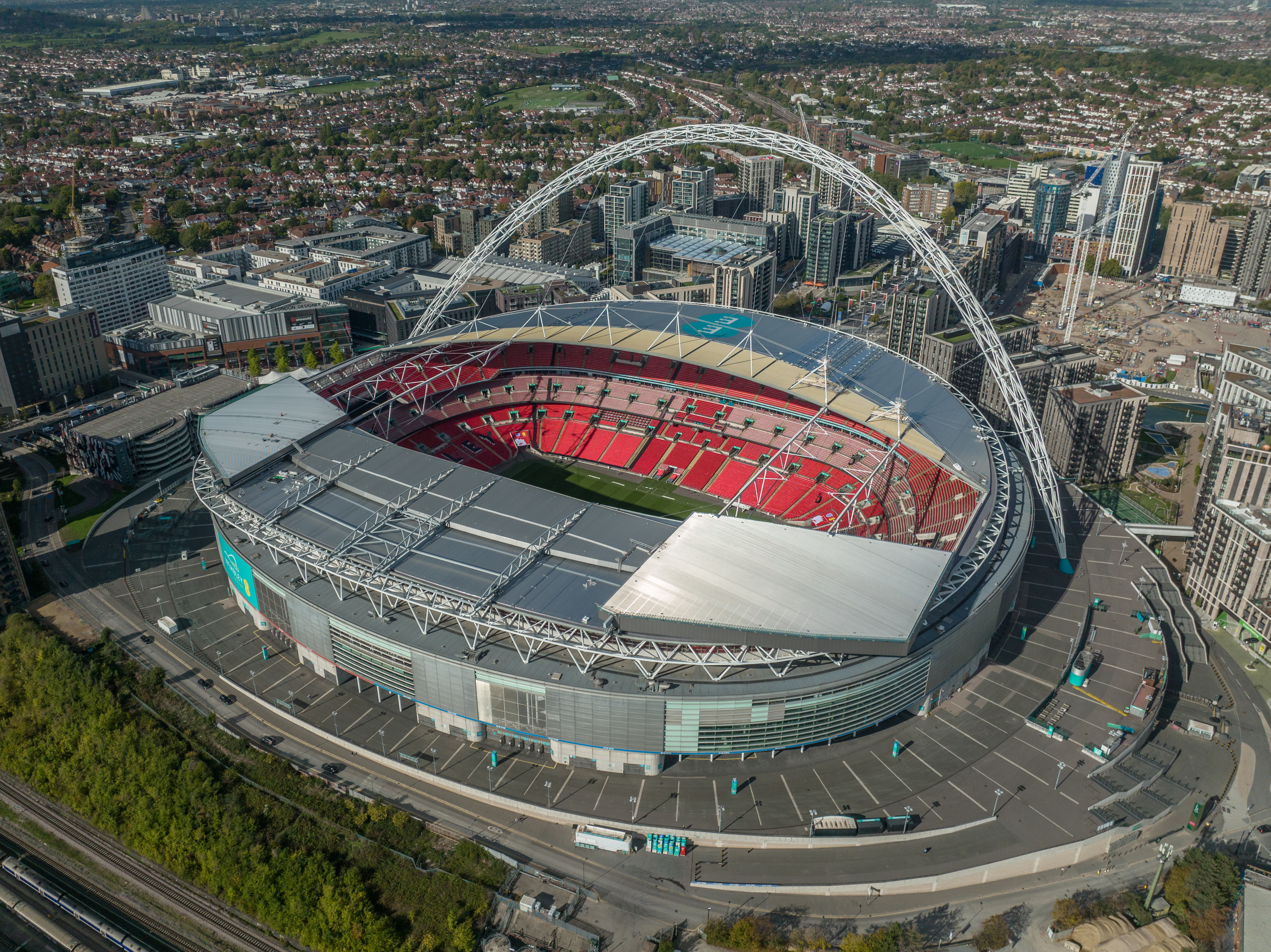
- Wembley Stadium hosted the final on 3 June 2023

Tournament details
- Country: England; Wales
- Dates: 5 November 2022 – 3 June 2023
- Teams: 732 (all); 640 (qualifying competition); 124 (main competition incl. 32 qualifiers)

Final positions
- Champions: Manchester City (7th title)
- Runners-up: Manchester United

Tournament statistics
- Matches played: 144
- Goals scored: 428 (2.97 per match)
- Attendance: 2,016,747 (14,005 per match)
- Top goal scorer: Paul Mullin (8 goals)
- (Note: All statistics do not include qualifying play-offs)

The 2022–23 FA Cup was the 142nd edition of the oldest football tournament in the world, the Football Association Challenge Cup. It is a one-legged competition whereby teams play each other once and the winner proceeds to the next round, in contrast to a two-legged competition in which teams play each other twice (home and away) to determine which team progresses to the next round. The FA Cup was sponsored by Emirates and known as the Emirates FA Cup for sponsorship purposes.

Premier League team Liverpool were the defending champions, having defeated Chelsea to secure their eighth title in the previous year's final, but they were eliminated in the fourth round by Brighton & Hove Albion.

Manchester City defeated city rivals Manchester United 2–1 in the final to win their seventh FA Cup title. As winners, they would have qualified for the 2023–24 UEFA Europa League group stage; however, as they had already qualified for European competition via the league standings, the spot was passed down to the sixth-placed Premier League team.

== Teams ==
The FA Cup was a knockout competition with 124 teams taking part all trying to reach the final at Wembley on 3 June 2023. The competition consisted of the 92 teams from the Football League system (20 teams from the Premier League and the 72 in total from the EFL Championship, EFL League One and EFL League Two) plus the 32 surviving teams out of 640 teams from the National League System (all but eleven clubs from 5–9 and eleven replacements from tier 10 of the English football league system) that started the competition in the qualifying rounds.

Qualification rounds were on a geographical basis and main competition rounds were drawn randomly usually either at the completion of the previous round or on the evening of the last televised game of a round being played depending on television broadcasting rights.

Round	Main date	Number of fixtures	Clubs remaining	New entries this round	Winners prize money	Losers prize money	Divisions entering this round
First round proper	Saturday 5 November 2022	40	124 → 84	48	£41,000	None	24 EFL League One teams 24 EFL League Two teams
Second round proper	Saturday 26 November 2022	20	84 → 64	None	£67,000	None	None
Third round proper	Saturday 7 January 2023	32	64 → 32	44	£105,000	None	20 Premier League teams 24 EFL Championship teams
Fourth round proper	Saturday 28 January 2023	16	32 → 16	None	£120,000	None	None
Fifth round proper	Wednesday 1 March 2023	8	16 → 8	None	£225,000	None	None
Quarter-finals	Saturday 18 March 2023	4	8 → 4	None	£450,000	None	None
Semi-finals	Saturday 22 April 2023	2	4 → 2	None	£1,000,000	£500,000	None
Final	Saturday 3 June 2023	1	2 → 1	None	£2,000,000	£1,000,000	None

== Qualifying ==
Teams that were not members of either the Premier League or English Football League competed in the qualifying rounds to secure one of 32 available places in the first round. On 6 August 2022, in an extra preliminary round match against Fleet Town, Newport (IOW) teenager Finn Smith became the youngest ever FA Cup goalscorer, a day after his 16th birthday. The fourth and final qualifying round was played on the weekend beginning 15 October.

The winners from the fourth qualifying round were Oldham Athletic, AFC Fylde, King's Lynn Town, York City, South Shields, Curzon Ashton, Wrexham, Solihull Moors, Gateshead, Chesterfield, Alvechurch, Buxton, Coalville Town, FC Halifax Town, Torquay United, Maidenhead United, Hereford, Taunton Town, Eastleigh, Woking, Dagenham & Redbridge, Ebbsfleet United, Chippenham Town, Weymouth, Oxford City, Bracknell Town, Needham Market, Chelmsford City, Boreham Wood, Merthyr Town, Farnborough and Barnet.

Needham Market was the only club in this season's tournament appearing in the competition proper for the first time, although reconstituted sides Merthyr Town and Farnborough were featuring at this stage for the first time in their own right following the liquidation of Merthyr Tydfil FC (in 2010) and Farnborough Town (in 2007). Of the others, Weymouth had last appeared in the first round in 2007-08, Coalville Town had last done so in 2004–05, Bracknell Town had last done so in 2000-01 and Alvechurch had last done so in 1973-74. The original Merthyr Town FC, members of the Football League from 1920 to 1930, had last qualified for the first round of the FA Cup in 1932-33 before folding in 1934.

== First round proper ==
The first round saw the 32 winners from the fourth qualifying round joined by the 48 clubs from League One and League Two. The draw was made on 17 October 2022 by Dion Dublin and Alan Smith on BBC Two, during a live broadcast from Alvechurch. The round included six teams from the seventh tier, the lowest-ranked teams remaining in the competition: Alvechurch, Bracknell Town, Coalville Town, Merthyr Town, Needham Market, and South Shields.

4 November 2022	Sheffield Wednesday (3)	2–0	Morecambe (3)	Sheffield
19:50 GMT	Windass 29'; Mighten 65'	Report		Stadium: Hillsborough Stadium; Attendance: 8,558; Referee: Sunny Sukhvir Gill

4 November 2022	Hereford (6)	1–3	Portsmouth (3)	Hereford
19:55 GMT	Storey 26'	Report	Hackett-Fairchild 33'; Bishop 64'; Pigott 80'	Stadium: Edgar Street; Attendance: 4,912; Referee: Sebastian Stockbridge

5 November 2022	South Shields (7)	0–2	Forest Green Rovers (3)	Jarrow
12:00 GMT		Report	Wickham 28', 90+6'	Stadium: First Cloud Arena; Attendance: 3,800; Referee: Scott Oldham

5 November 2022	Bradford City (4)	0–1	Harrogate Town (4)	Bradford
12:30 GMT		Report	Daly 9'	Stadium: Valley Parade; Attendance: 6,837; Referee: Martin Coy

5 November 2022	Bolton Wanderers (3)	1–2	Barnsley (3)	Horwich
14:00 GMT	Böðvarsson 80'	Report	Santos 6' (o.g.); Phillips 33'	Stadium: University of Bolton Stadium; Attendance: 5,999; Referee: Carl Boyeson

5 November 2022	Boreham Wood (5)	3–1	Eastleigh (5)	Borehamwood
15:00 GMT	Broadbent 10'; Ndlovu 12'; Brunt 60'	Report	Carter 17'	Stadium: Meadow Park; Attendance: 904; Referee: Paul Marsden

5 November 2022	Maidenhead United (5)	0–1	Dagenham & Redbridge (5)	Maidenhead
15:00 GMT		Report	Walker 81'	Stadium: York Road; Attendance: 1,060; Referee: Paul Johnson

5 November 2022	Crawley Town (4)	1–4	Accrington Stanley (3)	Crawley
15:00 GMT	Hessenthaler 18'	Report	Whalley 1', 22', 49'; Hamilton 45'	Stadium: Broadfield Stadium; Attendance: 2,770; Referee: Ollie Yates

5 November 2022	Solihull Moors (5)	2–2	Hartlepool United (4)	Solihull
15:00 GMT	Dallas 51'; Sbarra 84'	Report	Umerah 18'; Hamilton 69'	Stadium: Damson Park; Attendance: 1,658; Referee: Paul Howard

15 November 2022 Replay	Hartlepool United (4)	1–1 (a.e.t.) (4–3 p)	Solihull Moors (5)	Hartlepool
19:45 GMT	Tumilty 90'	Report	Barnett 8'	Stadium: Victoria Park; Attendance: 2,170; Referee: Seb Stockbridge
	Penalties
	Featherstone (penalty scored); Ferguson (penalty missed); Robinson (penalty scored); Hastie (penalty scored); Grey (penalty scored)		Storer (penalty missed); Kelly (penalty missed); Coker (penalty scored); Jones (penalty scored); Reid (penalty scored)

5 November 2022	AFC Fylde (6)	1–1	Gillingham (4)	Medlar-with-Wesham
15:00 GMT	Walker 83'	Report	Mandron 45+3'	Stadium: Mill Farm Sports Village; Attendance: 996; Referee: Tom Reeves

15 November 2022 Replay	Gillingham (4)	1–0	AFC Fylde (6)	Gillingham
19:45 GMT	Walker 43'	Report		Stadium: Priestfield Stadium; Attendance: 1,932; Referee: Will Finnie

5 November 2022	Peterborough United (3)	0–0	Salford City (4)	Peterborough
15:00 GMT		Report		Stadium: London Road; Attendance: 4,021; Referee: Tom Nield

16 November 2022 Replay	Salford City (4)	0–3	Peterborough United (3)	Salford
19:45 GMT		Report	Mason-Clark 39'; Marriott 78', 83'	Stadium: Moor Lane; Attendance: 1,059; Referee: Ben Toner

5 November 2022	Sutton United (4)	0–2	Farnborough (6)	Sutton
15:00 GMT		Report	Fernandes 86'; Amartey 90+6'	Stadium: Gander Green Lane; Attendance: 1,929; Referee: Alan Young

5 November 2022	Grimsby Town (4)	5–1	Plymouth Argyle (3)	Cleethorpes
15:00 GMT	Smith 10'; Efete 33'; Kiernan 39', 58'; Driscoll-Glennan 45+7'	Report	Randell 5'	Stadium: Blundell Park; Attendance: 4,571; Referee: Thomas Parsons

5 November 2022	Milton Keynes Dons (3)	6–0	Taunton Town (6)	Denbigh
15:00 GMT	Devoy 6'; Grigg 13'; Burns 48'; Eisa 74'; Grant 82', 84'	Report		Stadium: Stadium MK; Attendance: 2,739; Referee: Thomas Kirk

5 November 2022	Ebbsfleet United (6)	2–1	FC Halifax Town (5)	Northfleet
15:00 GMT	Edser 13'; Bingham 52'	Report	Cooke 17'	Stadium: Stonebridge Road; Attendance: 2,099; Referee: Edward Duckworth

5 November 2022	Carlisle United (4)	2–1	Tranmere Rovers (4)	Carlisle
15:00 GMT	Gibson 30'; Harris 66'	Report	Byrne 82'	Stadium: Brunton Park; Attendance: 4,154; Referee: Declan Bourne

5 November 2022	Chippenham Town (6)	1–0	Lincoln City (3)	Chippenham
15:00 GMT	Hanks 44'	Report		Stadium: Hardenhuish Park; Attendance: 2,175; Referee: Carl Brook

5 November 2022	Shrewsbury Town (3)	2–1	York City (5)	Shrewsbury
15:00 GMT	Shipley 2'; Leahy 45+3' (pen.)	Report	Duku 45+5'	Stadium: New Meadow; Attendance: 3,807; Referee: Scott Tallis

5 November 2022	Buxton (6)	2–0	Merthyr Town (7)	Buxton
15:00 GMT	De Girolamo 5' (pen.); Gilchrist 88'	Report		Stadium: The Silverlands; Attendance: 1,879; Referee: Ruebyn Ricardo

5 November 2022	Charlton Athletic (3)	4–1	Coalville Town (7)	Charlton
15:00 GMT	Payne 24', 81'; Stockley 45+3'; Aneke 90'	Report	Chambers 52'	Stadium: The Valley; Attendance: 4,707; Referee: Lewis Smith

5 November 2022	Weymouth (6)	1–1	AFC Wimbledon (4)	Weymouth
15:00 GMT	Rose 70'	Report	Assal 5'	Stadium: Bob Lucas Stadium; Attendance: 2,934; Referee: Sam Allison

15 November 2022 Replay	AFC Wimbledon (4)	3–1	Weymouth (6)	Merton
19:45 GMT	Assal 48'; Chislett 61', 64'	Report	Ash 78'	Stadium: Plough Lane; Attendance: 3,672; Referee: Declan Bourne

5 November 2022	Newport County (4)	2–0	Colchester United (4)	Newport
15:00 GMT	O'Hara 28' (o.g.); Aa. Lewis 76'	Report		Stadium: Rodney Parade; Attendance: 2,377; Referee: Bobby Madden

5 November 2022	Stockport County (4)	4–0	Swindon Town (4)	Edgeley
15:00 GMT	Sarcevic 11', 29'; Wright 16'; Rydel 58'	Report		Stadium: Edgeley Park; Attendance: 4,534; Referee: Marc Edwards

5 November 2022	Doncaster Rovers (4)	0–1	King's Lynn Town (6)	Doncaster
15:00 GMT		Report	Omotayo 83'	Stadium: Eco-Power Stadium; Attendance: 3,965; Referee: Geoff Eltringham

5 November 2022	Gateshead (5)	2–3	Stevenage (4)	Gateshead
15:00 GMT	Harris 53'; Conteh 62'	Report	Roberts 21'; Richardson 34' (o.g.); Norris 72'	Stadium: Gateshead International Stadium; Attendance: 1,059; Referee: Peter Wright

5 November 2022	Fleetwood Town (3)	3–1	Oxford City (6)	Fleetwood
15:00 GMT	Warrington 14'; Lane 44', 84'	Report	Potter 81'	Stadium: Highbury Stadium; Attendance: 1,357; Referee: Aaron Jackson

5 November 2022	Burton Albion (3)	2–0	Needham Market (7)	Burton upon Trent
15:00 GMT	Oshilaja 34'; Powell 90+4'	Report		Stadium: Pirelli Stadium; Attendance: 1,989; Referee: Andrew Kitchen

5 November 2022	Port Vale (3)	2–3	Exeter City (3)	Burslem
15:00 GMT	Politic 25'; Butterworth 87'	Report	J. Brown 43', 66'; Collins 89'	Stadium: Vale Park; Attendance: 4,807; Referee: Simon Mather

5 November 2022	Bristol Rovers (3)	1–0	Rochdale (4)	Horfield
15:00 GMT	Sinclair 65'	Report		Stadium: Memorial Stadium; Attendance: 4,679; Referee: Will Finnie

5 November 2022	Wycombe Wanderers (3)	0–2	Walsall (4)	High Wycombe
15:00 GMT		Report	Maddox 41'; Hutchinson 62'	Stadium: Adams Park; Attendance: 2,319; Referee: Martin Woods

5 November 2022	Crewe Alexandra (4)	1–0	Leyton Orient (4)	Crewe
15:00 GMT	Sambou 90+2'	Report		Stadium: Gresty Road; Attendance: 2,104; Referee: Sam Purkiss

5 November 2022	Barnet (5)	1–1	Chelmsford City (6)	Canons Park
15:00 GMT	Wynter 49'	Report	Ruff 90+2'	Stadium: The Hive Stadium; Attendance: 1,773; Referee: Daniel Middleton

14 November 2022 Replay	Chelmsford City (6)	0–1	Barnet (5)	Chelmsford
19:45 GMT		Report	Kanu 74'	Stadium: Melbourne Stadium; Attendance: 3,015; Referee: Adrian Quelch

5 November 2022	Chesterfield (5)	1–0	Northampton Town (4)	Chesterfield
15:00 GMT	Dobra 14'	Report		Stadium: Technique Stadium; Attendance: 5,886; Referee: Adam Herczeg

5 November 2022	Cheltenham Town (3)	1–2	Alvechurch (7)	Cheltenham
15:00 GMT	Jackson 54'	Report	Waldron 19', 50'	Stadium: Whaddon Road; Attendance: 4,406; Referee: Robert Lewis

5 November 2022	Barrow (4)	0–1	Mansfield Town (4)	Barrow-in-Furness
15:00 GMT		Report	Hawkins 39'	Stadium: Holker Street; Attendance: 2,501; Referee: Andy Haines

6 November 2022	Wrexham (5)	3–0	Oldham Athletic (5)	Wrexham
12:30 GMT	Dalby 10'; Mullin 25', 62'	Report		Stadium: Racecourse Ground; Attendance: 9,113; Referee: Sam Barrott

6 November 2022	Curzon Ashton (6)	0–0	Cambridge United (3)	Ashton-under-Lyne
14:00 GMT		Report		Stadium: Tameside Stadium; Attendance: 1,567; Referee: Anthony Backhouse

15 November 2022 Replay	Cambridge United (3)	0–0 (a.e.t.) (4–2 p)	Curzon Ashton (6)	Cambridge
19:45 GMT		Report		Stadium: Abbey Stadium; Attendance: 2,222; Referee: Charles Breakspear
	Penalties
	Ironside (penalty scored); Lankester (penalty scored); Knibbs (penalty scored); Digby (penalty scored)		(penalty missed) Hancock; (penalty scored) Richards; (penalty scored) Walker; (penalty missed) Dimaio

6 November 2022	Torquay United (5)	2–2	Derby County (3)	Torquay
15:00 GMT	Hall 56' (pen.); Goodwin 90+5'	Report	Osula 27', 47'	Stadium: Plainmoor; Attendance: 4,269; Referee: David Rock

15 November 2022 Replay	Derby County (3)	5–0	Torquay United (5)	Derby
19:45 GMT	Ellis 7' (o.g.); Osula 15'; Thompson 38'; Dobbin 62'; McGoldrick 79'	Report		Stadium: Pride Park Stadium; Attendance: 7,201; Referee: Sam Purkiss

7 November 2022	Bracknell Town (7)	0–3	Ipswich Town (3)	Sandhurst
19:45 GMT		Report	Bayliss 66' (o.g.); Ladapo 73'; Camará 81'	Stadium: Bottom Meadow; Attendance: 1,950; Referee: Charles Breakspear

16 November 2022	Woking (5)	1–2	Oxford United (3)	Woking
19:45 GMT	Ince 43'	Report	Bodin 39'; Goodrham 53'	Stadium: Kingfield Stadium; Attendance: 4,173; Referee: Craig Hicks

== Second round proper ==
The draw for the second round was made on BBC Two on 7 November 2022 by Jermaine Beckford and Mickey Thomas at the Racecourse Ground in Wrexham, and consisted of the 40 winners from the previous round. The round contained one team from the seventh tier, Alvechurch, who defeated EFL League One club Cheltenham Town in the first round.

26 November 2022	King's Lynn Town (6)	0–3	Stevenage (4)	King's Lynn
12:45 GMT		Report	Norris 49', 51'; Reid 54'	Stadium: The Walks; Attendance: 4,203; Referee: Andrew Kitchen

26 November 2022	Cambridge United (3)	1–2	Grimsby Town (4)	Cambridge
15:00 GMT	Smith 81'	Report	Khan 61', 90'	Stadium: Abbey Stadium; Attendance: 3,044; Referee: Carl Brook

26 November 2022	Wrexham (5)	4–1	Farnborough (6)	Wrexham
15:15 GMT	Mullin 49', 82', 90'; Lee 78'	Report	Pendlebury 62'	Stadium: Racecourse Ground; Attendance: 9,118; Referee: James Oldham

26 November 2022	Accrington Stanley (3)	1–0	Barnet (5)	Accrington
15:00 GMT	Hamilton 84'	Report		Stadium: Crown Ground; Attendance: 1,771; Referee: Adam Herczeg

26 November 2022	Barnsley (3)	3–0	Crewe Alexandra (4)	Barnsley
15:00 GMT	Cole 30'; Phillips 50'; Benson 57' (pen.)	Report		Stadium: Oakwell; Attendance: 3,967; Referee: Tom Reeves

26 November 2022	Forest Green Rovers (3)	2–1	Alvechurch (7)	Nailsworth
15:00 GMT	Wickham 24' (pen.); March 51'	Report	Abbey 49'	Stadium: The New Lawn; Attendance: 2,758; Referee: Martin Coy

26 November 2022	Portsmouth (3)	3–2	Milton Keynes Dons (3)	Portsmouth
15:00 GMT	Hackett-Fairchild 22'; Bishop 35' (pen.), 48' (pen.)	Report	Burns 19'; Eisa 61'	Stadium: Fratton Park; Attendance: 8,056; Referee: Sunny Sukhvir Gill

26 November 2022	Shrewsbury Town (3)	3–1	Peterborough United (3)	Shrewsbury
15:00 GMT	Bayliss 2'; Pennington 35'; Leahy 45+7' (pen.)	Report	Poku 13'	Stadium: New Meadow; Attendance: 2,895; Referee: Simon Mather

26 November 2022	Hartlepool United (4)	3–1	Harrogate Town (4)	Hartlepool
15:00 GMT	Cooke 41'; Umerah 71', 45+4' (pen.)	Report	Coley 73'	Stadium: Victoria Park; Attendance: 2,772; Referee: Sam Purkiss

26 November 2022	Charlton Athletic (3)	2–2	Stockport County (4)	Charlton
15:00 GMT	Lewis 23' (o.g.); Morgan 39'	Report	Hussey 3'; Hippolyte 90+7'	Stadium: The Valley; Attendance: 3,889; Referee: Lee Swabey

7 December 2022 Replay	Stockport County (4)	3–1	Charlton Athletic (3)	Edgeley
19:45 GMT	Collar 25', 73', 81' (pen.)	Report	Wright 7' (o.g.)	Stadium: Edgeley Park; Attendance: 6,242; Referee: Scott Oldham

26 November 2022	Oxford United (3)	4–1	Exeter City (3)	Oxford
15:00 GMT	Taylor 9'; Bodin 79', 88'; Brannagan 85'	Report	Jay 89'	Stadium: Kassam Stadium; Attendance: 3,599; Referee: Will Finnie

26 November 2022	Sheffield Wednesday (3)	2–1	Mansfield Town (4)	Owlerton, Sheffield
15:00 GMT	Smith 78', 83'	Report	Lapslie 34'	Stadium: Hillsborough Stadium; Attendance: 13,932; Referee: Ollie Yates

26 November 2022	AFC Wimbledon (4)	0–2	Chesterfield (5)	Wimbledon
15:00 GMT		Report	Dobra 44'; King 76'	Stadium: Plough Lane; Attendance: 4,176; Referee: David Rock

26 November 2022	Walsall (4)	2–1	Carlisle United (4)	Walsall
15:00 GMT	Williams 88'; James-Taylor 90+3'	Report	Edmondson 29'	Stadium: Bescot Stadium; Attendance: 3,499; Referee: Scott Oldham

26 November 2022	Dagenham & Redbridge (5)	1–1	Gillingham (4)	Dagenham
17:00 GMT	Walker 80'	Report	Kashket 90+2'	Stadium: Victoria Road; Attendance: 1,702; Referee: Darren Drysdale

8 December 2022 Replay	Gillingham (4)	3–2	Dagenham & Redbridge (5)	Gillingham
19:15 GMT	Baggott 26'; Ehmer 77'; Adelakun 90+5'	Report	Robinson 15'; Saunders 84'	Stadium: Priestfield Stadium; Attendance: 1,533; Referee: Thomas Kirk

27 November 2022	Ebbsfleet United (6)	0–1	Fleetwood Town (3)	Northfleet
12:30 GMT		Report	G. Garner 64'	Stadium: Stonebridge Road; Attendance: 2,960; Referee: Adam Herczeg

27 November 2022	Bristol Rovers (3)	0–2	Boreham Wood (5)	Horfield
14:00 GMT		Report	Evans 18'; Stephens 30'	Stadium: Memorial Stadium; Attendance: 4,769; Referee: Sam Barrott

27 November 2022	Burton Albion (3)	6–1	Chippenham Town (6)	Burton upon Trent
14:00 GMT	Smith 26'; Oshilaja 44', 90'; Kamwa 54'; Winnall 78', 84'	Report	Parsons 60'	Stadium: Pirelli Stadium; Attendance: 2,080; Referee: Ben Speedie

27 November 2022	Newport County (4)	1–2	Derby County (3)	Newport
15:15 GMT	Farquharson 41'	Report	Sibley 54'; McGoldrick 88'	Stadium: Rodney Parade; Attendance: 3,507; Referee: Anthony Backhouse

27 November 2022	Ipswich Town (3)	4–0	Buxton (6)	Ipswich
17:00 GMT	Chaplin 33', 73'; Ahadme 38'; Jackson 90+2'	Report		Stadium: Portman Road; Attendance: 9,817; Referee: Ross Joyce

== Third round proper ==
The draw for the third round was made on 28 November 2022, consisting of the 20 winners from the previous round, all 20 members of the Premier League and the 24 EFL Championship clubs. The round included three teams from the fifth tier, the lowest-ranked teams remaining in the competition: Chesterfield, Boreham Wood, and Wrexham.

6 January 2023	Manchester United (1)	3–1	Everton (1)	Trafford
20:00 GMT	Antony 4'; Coady 52' (o.g.); Rashford 90+7' (pen.)	Report	Coady 14'	Stadium: Old Trafford; Attendance: 72,306; Referee: Darren England

7 January 2023	Preston North End (2)	3–1	Huddersfield Town (2)	Preston
12:30 GMT	Lees 60' (o.g.); Diaby 73'; Browne 85'	Report	Kamberi 57'	Stadium: Deepdale; Attendance: 6,799; Referee: Anthony Backhouse

7 January 2023	Tottenham Hotspur (1)	1–0	Portsmouth (3)	Tottenham
12:30 GMT	Kane 50'	Report		Stadium: Tottenham Hotspur Stadium; Attendance: 60,161; Referee: Thomas Bramall

7 January 2023	Gillingham (4)	0–1	Leicester City (1)	Gillingham
12:30 GMT		Report	Iheanacho 56'	Stadium: Priestfield Stadium; Attendance: 8,567; Referee: Sam Barrott

7 January 2023	Crystal Palace (1)	1–2	Southampton (1)	Selhurst
12:30 GMT	Édouard 14'	Report	Ward-Prowse 37'; A. Armstorng 68'	Stadium: Selhurst Park; Attendance: 20,320; Referee: Darren Bond

7 January 2023	Reading (2)	2–0	Watford (2)	Reading
12:30 GMT	Abrefa 45+3'; Long 90+3'	Report		Stadium: Select Car Leasing Stadium; Attendance: 7,954; Referee: Peter Bankes

7 January 2023	Middlesbrough (2)	1–5	Brighton & Hove Albion (1)	Middlesbrough
15:00 GMT	Akpom 13'	Report	Groß 8'; Lallana 29'; Mac Allister 58', 80'; Undav 88'	Stadium: Riverside Stadium; Attendance: 21,982; Referee: Simon Hooper

7 January 2023	Chesterfield (5)	3–3	West Bromwich Albion (2)	Chesterfield
15:00 GMT	Williams 7'; Dobra 36', 41'	Report	Thomas-Asante 2', 90+3'; Grant 17'	Stadium: Technique Stadium; Attendance: 9,819; Referee: Rebecca Welch

17 January 2023 Replay	West Bromwich Albion (2)	4–0	Chesterfield (5)	West Bromwich
20:00 GMT	Swift 23'; Rogic 48'; Livermore 54'; Malcolm 90+1'	Report		Stadium: The Hawthorns; Attendance: 12,638; Referee: Tim Robinson

7 January 2023	Boreham Wood (5)	1–1	Accrington Stanley (3)	Borehamwood
15:00 GMT	Ndlovu 78'	Report	Astley 6'	Stadium: Meadow Park; Attendance: 2,001; Referee: Oliver Langford

24 January 2023 Replay	Accrington Stanley (3)	1–0 (a.e.t.)	Boreham Wood (5)	Accrington
19:45 GMT	Leigh 97' (pen.)	Report		Stadium: Crown Ground; Attendance: 1,940; Referee: Scott Oldham
Note: The Accrington Stanley v Boreham Wood replay match, originally scheduled to be played on 17 January 2023, 19:45 GMT, was postponed due to cold weather causing an unplayable pitch.

7 January 2023	Bournemouth (1)	2–4	Burnley (2)	Bournemouth
15:00 GMT	Christie 12'; Solanke 48'	Report	Benson 6', 57'; Zaroury 39', 43'	Stadium: Dean Court; Attendance: 10,116; Referee: Tim Robinson

7 January 2023	Fleetwood Town (3)	2–1	Queens Park Rangers (2)	Fleetwood
15:00 GMT	Nsiala 40'; Omochere 67'	Report	Field 37'	Stadium: Highbury Stadium; Attendance: 3,151; Referee: Stephen Martin

7 January 2023	Blackpool (2)	4–1	Nottingham Forest (1)	Blackpool
15:00 GMT	Ekpiteta 17'; Poveda 64'; Hamilton 71'; Yates 87'	Report	Yates 90+2'	Stadium: Bloomfield Road; Attendance: 8,750; Referee: James Linington

7 January 2023	Hull City (2)	0–2	Fulham (1)	Kingston upon Hull
15:00 GMT		Report	Kurzawa 37'; James 90+4'	Stadium: MKM Stadium; Attendance: 14,175; Referee: Josh Smith

7 January 2023	Millwall (2)	0–2	Sheffield United (2)	London
15:00 GMT		Report	Jebbison 23'; Bogle 36'	Stadium: The Den; Attendance: 7,268; Referee: John Brooks

7 January 2023	Shrewsbury Town (3)	1–2	Sunderland (2)	Shrewsbury
15:00 GMT	Pennington 81'	Report	Stewart 90+2'; O'Nien 90+4'	Stadium: New Meadow; Attendance: 6,309; Referee: Scott Oldham

7 January 2023	Ipswich Town (3)	4–1	Rotherham United (2)	Ipswich
15:00 GMT	Humphreys 43'; Chaplin 74' (pen.); Ladapo 79'; Burns 87' (pen.)	Report	Washington 47' (pen.)	Stadium: Portman Road; Attendance: 15,728; Referee: Sebastian Stockbridge

7 January 2023	Brentford (1)	0–1	West Ham United (1)	Brentford
17:30 GMT		Report	Benrahma 79'	Stadium: Gtech Community Stadium; Attendance: 16,725; Referee: Andre Marriner

7 January 2023	Coventry City (2)	3–4	Wrexham (5)	Coventry
17:30 GMT	Sheaf 36'; Gyökeres 69'; Palmer 76'	Report	Dalby 12'; Lee 18'; O'Connor 45+6'; Mullin 58' (pen.)	Stadium: Coventry Building Society Arena; Attendance: 18,218; Referee: Tom Nield

7 January 2023	Luton Town (2)	1–1	Wigan Athletic (2)	Luton
17:30 GMT	Cornick 45+1'	Report	Naylor 17'	Stadium: Kenilworth Road; Attendance: 5,660; Referee: David Webb

17 January 2023 Replay	Wigan Athletic (2)	1–2	Luton Town (2)	Wigan
19:45 GMT	Aasgaard 46'	Report	Woodrow 51'; Adebayo 90+8'	Stadium: DW Stadium; Attendance: 5,668; Referee: Matt Donohue

7 January 2023	Grimsby Town (4)	1–0	Burton Albion (3)	Cleethorpes
17:30 GMT	Richardson 76'	Report		Stadium: Blundell Park; Attendance: 5,447; Referee: Charles Breakspear

7 January 2023	Sheffield Wednesday (3)	2–1	Newcastle United (1)	Sheffield
18:00 GMT	Windass 52', 65'	Report	Bruno Guimarães 69'	Stadium: Hillsborough Stadium; Attendance: 25,884; Referee: Michael Salisbury

7 January 2023	Liverpool (1)	2–2	Wolverhampton Wanderers (1)	Liverpool
20:00 GMT	Núñez 45'; Salah 52'	Report	Guedes 26'; Hwang Hee-chan 66'	Stadium: Anfield; Attendance: 52,636; Referee: Andrew Madley

17 January 2023 Replay	Wolverhampton Wanderers (1)	0–1	Liverpool (1)	Wolverhampton
19:45 GMT		Report	Elliott 13'	Stadium: Molineux Stadium; Attendance: 30,948; Referee: Andre Marriner

8 January 2023	Derby County (3)	3–0	Barnsley (3)	Derby
12:30 GMT	Collins 45+1' (pen.); Barkhuizen 60'; Knight 79'	Report		Stadium: Pride Park Stadium; Attendance: 11,512; Referee: Sunny Singh Gill

8 January 2023	Bristol City (2)	1–1	Swansea City (2)	Bristol
12:30 GMT	Semenyo 75'	Report	Piroe 15'	Stadium: Ashton Gate; Attendance: 12,145; Referee: Craig Pawson

17 January 2023 Replay	Swansea City (2)	1–2 (a.e.t.)	Bristol City (2)	Swansea
19:45 GMT	Cooper 73'	Report	Sykes 62'; Bell 112'	Stadium: Swansea.com Stadium; Attendance: 10,030; Referee: Graham Scott

8 January 2023	Stockport County (4)	1–2	Walsall (4)	Edgeley
14:00 GMT	Madden 88'	Report	Johnson 63'; Williams 90+5' (pen.)	Stadium: Edgeley Park; Attendance: 9,178; Referee: Andrew Kitchen

8 January 2023	Cardiff City (2)	2–2	Leeds United (1)	Cardiff
14:00 GMT	Philogene 24'; Ojo 31'	Report	Rodrigo 65'; Perkins 90+3'	Stadium: Cardiff City Stadium; Attendance: 20,324; Referee: Jarred Gillett

18 January 2023 Replay	Leeds United (1)	5–2	Cardiff City (2)	Leeds
19:45 GMT	Gnonto 1', 36'; Rodrigo 34'; Bamford 71', 76'	Report	Robinson 84', 90+3' (pen.)	Stadium: Elland Road; Attendance: 34,465; Referee: Thomas Bramall

8 January 2023	Norwich City (2)	0–1	Blackburn Rovers (2)	Norwich
14:00 GMT		Report	Vale 31'	Stadium: Carrow Road; Attendance: 20,472; Referee: Gavin Ward

8 January 2023	Hartlepool United (4)	0–3	Stoke City (2)	Hartlepool
14:00 GMT		Report	Murray 16' (o.g.); Brown 43'; Menayese 48' (o.g.)	Stadium: The Suit Direct Stadium; Attendance: 4,340; Referee: Ben Toner

8 January 2023	Manchester City (1)	4–0	Chelsea (1)	Manchester
16:30 GMT	Mahrez 23', 85' (pen.); Álvarez 30' (pen.); Foden 38'	Report		Stadium: City of Manchester Stadium; Attendance: 51,505; Referee: Robert Jones

8 January 2023	Aston Villa (1)	1–2	Stevenage (4)	Birmingham
16:30 GMT	Sanson 33'	Report	Reid 88' (pen.); Campbell 90'	Stadium: Villa Park; Attendance: 32,343; Referee: Graham Scott

9 January 2023	Oxford United (3)	0–3	Arsenal (1)	Oxford
20:00 GMT		Report	Elneny 63'; Nketiah 70', 76'	Stadium: Kassam Stadium; Attendance: 11,538; Referee: David Coote

17 January 2023	Forest Green Rovers (3)	1–2	Birmingham City (2)	Nailsworth
19:45 GMT	Stevenson 8'	Report	Jutkiewicz 50'; Long 65'	Stadium: The New Lawn; Attendance: 3,701; Referee: Sam Allison
Note: The Forest Green Rovers v Birmingham City match, originally scheduled to be played on 7 January 2023, 12:30 GMT, was postponed due to heavy rain causing a waterlogged pitch.

== Fourth round proper ==
The draw for the fourth round was made on 8 January 2023, consisting of the 32 winners from the previous round. The round included one team from the fifth tier, the lowest-ranked team remaining in the competition: Wrexham.

27 January 2023	Manchester City (1)	1–0	Arsenal (1)	Manchester
20:00 GMT	Aké 64'	Report		Stadium: City of Manchester Stadium; Attendance: 51,694; Referee: Paul Tierney

28 January 2023	Accrington Stanley (3)	1–3	Leeds United (1)	Accrington
12:30 GMT	Adekoya 81'	Report	Harrison 23'; Firpo 66'; Sinisterra 68'	Stadium: Crown Ground; Attendance: 5,268; Referee: Josh Smith

28 January 2023	Walsall (4)	0–1	Leicester City (1)	Walsall
12:30 GMT		Report	Iheanacho 68'	Stadium: Bescot Stadium; Attendance: 10,297; Referee: Gavin Ward

28 January 2023	Blackburn Rovers (2)	2–2	Birmingham City (2)	Blackburn
15:00 GMT	Dack 33'; Rankin-Costello 46'	Report	Khadra 3'; James 90+1'	Stadium: Ewood Park; Attendance: 13,687; Referee: Keith Stroud

31 January 2023 Replay	Birmingham City (2)	0–1 (a.e.t.)	Blackburn Rovers (2)	Birmingham
19:45 GMT		Report	Trusty 100' (o.g.)	Stadium: St Andrew's; Attendance: 7,183; Referee: Stephen Martin

28 January 2023	Bristol City (2)	3–0	West Bromwich Albion (2)	Bristol
15:00 GMT	Bell 12', 48'; Scott 28'	Report		Stadium: Ashton Gate; Attendance: 15,754; Referee: Matt Donohue

28 January 2023	Fulham (1)	1–1	Sunderland (2)	Fulham
15:00 GMT	Cairney 61'	Report	Clarke 6'	Stadium: Craven Cottage; Attendance: 22,905; Referee: Michael Salisbury

8 February 2023 Replay	Sunderland (2)	2–3	Fulham (1)	Sunderland
19:45 GMT	Clarke 77'; Bennette 90'	Report	Wilson 8'; Pereira 59'; Kurzawa 82'	Stadium: Stadium of Light; Attendance: 29,651; Referee: Tim Robinson

28 January 2023	Ipswich Town (3)	0–0	Burnley (2)	Ipswich
15:00 GMT		Report		Stadium: Portman Road; Attendance: 25,420; Referee: Tom Nield

7 February 2023 Replay	Burnley (2)	2–1	Ipswich Town (3)	Burnley
19:45 GMT	Tella 2', 90+4'	Report	Hirst 3'	Stadium: Turf Moor; Attendance: 11,543; Referee: Scott Oldham

28 January 2023	Luton Town (2)	2–2	Grimsby Town (4)	Luton
15:00 GMT	Adebayo 49' (pen.); Clark 66'	Report	Holohan 43'; Clifton 67'	Stadium: Kenilworth Road; Attendance: 8,552; Referee: Tim Robinson

7 February 2023 Replay	Grimsby Town (4)	3–0	Luton Town (2)	Cleethorpes
19:45 GMT	Clifton 9'; Orsi 28'; Amos 45+5'	Report		Stadium: Blundell Park; Attendance: 7,051; Referee: Sam Barrott

28 January 2023	Sheffield Wednesday (3)	1–1	Fleetwood Town (3)	Sheffield
15:00 GMT	Earl 71' (o.g.)	Report	Omochere 52'	Stadium: Hillsborough Stadium; Attendance: 15,743; Referee: Charles Breakspear

7 February 2023 Replay	Fleetwood Town (3)	1–0	Sheffield Wednesday (3)	Fleetwood
19:45 GMT	Mendes Gomes 60'	Report		Stadium: Highbury Stadium; Attendance: 2,936; Referee: Darren Bond

28 January 2023	Southampton (1)	2–1	Blackpool (2)	Southampton
15:00 GMT	Perraud 22', 62'	Report	Patino 67'	Stadium: St Mary's Stadium; Attendance: 20,665; Referee: Craig Pawson

28 January 2023	Preston North End (2)	0–3	Tottenham Hotspur (1)	Preston
18:00 GMT		Report	Son Heung-min 50', 69'; Danjuma 87'	Stadium: Deepdale; Attendance: 21,219; Referee: Peter Bankes

28 January 2023	Manchester United (1)	3–1	Reading (2)	Trafford
20:00 GMT	Casemiro 54', 58'; Fred 66'	Report	Mbengue 72'	Stadium: Old Trafford; Attendance: 73,460; Referee: Darren England

29 January 2023	Brighton & Hove Albion (1)	2–1	Liverpool (1)	Brighton & Hove
13:30 GMT	Dunk 39'; Mitoma 90+2'	Report	Elliott 30'	Stadium: Falmer Stadium; Attendance: 31,675; Referee: David Coote

29 January 2023	Stoke City (2)	3–1	Stevenage (4)	Stoke-on-Trent
14:00 GMT	Brown 3'; Laurent 73'; Baker 80' (pen.)	Report	Reid 70'	Stadium: Bet365 Stadium; Attendance: 14,392; Referee: David Webb

29 January 2023	Wrexham (5)	3–3	Sheffield United (2)	Wrexham
16:30 GMT	J. Jones 50'; O'Connor 61'; Mullin 86'	Report	McBurnie 2'; Norwood 65'; Egan 90+5'	Stadium: Racecourse Ground; Attendance: 9,909; Referee: Dean Whitestone

7 February 2023 Replay	Sheffield United (2)	3–1	Wrexham (5)	Sheffield
19:45 GMT	Ahmedhodžić 50'; Sharp 90+4'; Berge 90+6'	Report	Mullin 59' (pen.)	Stadium: Bramall Lane; Attendance: 20,310; Referee: Leigh Doughty

30 January 2023	Derby County (3)	0–2	West Ham United (1)	Derby
19:45 GMT		Report	Bowen 10'; Antonio 50'	Stadium: Pride Park; Attendance: 25,308; Referee: Thomas Bramall

== Fifth round proper ==
The draw for the fifth round took place on 30 January 2023 on The One Show at Broadcasting House in Portland Place. The matches took place in the week commencing 27 February 2023. This round included one team from the fourth tier, the lowest-ranked team remaining in the competition: Grimsby Town.

28 February 2023	Stoke City (2)	0–1	Brighton & Hove Albion (1)	Stoke-on-Trent
19:15 GMT		Report	Ferguson 30'	Stadium: Bet365 Stadium; Attendance: 12,949; Referee: Darren Bond

28 February 2023	Leicester City (1)	1–2	Blackburn Rovers (2)	Leicester
19:30 GMT	Iheanacho 67'	Report	Dolan 33'; Szmodics 52'	Stadium: King Power Stadium; Attendance: 23,379; Referee: Tim Robinson

28 February 2023	Fulham (1)	2–0	Leeds United (1)	London
19:45 GMT	Palhinha 21'; Solomon 56'	Report		Stadium: Craven Cottage; Attendance: 19,359; Referee: Chris Kavanagh

28 February 2023	Bristol City (2)	0–3	Manchester City (1)	Bristol
20:00 GMT		Report	Foden 7', 74'; De Bruyne 81'	Stadium: Ashton Gate Stadium; Attendance: 25,713; Referee: Andre Marriner

1 March 2023	Southampton (1)	1–2	Grimsby Town (4)	Southampton
19:15 GMT	Ćaleta-Car 65'	Report	Holohan 45+1' (pen.), 50' (pen.)	Stadium: St Mary's Stadium; Attendance: 27,584; Referee: Thomas Bramall

1 March 2023	Burnley (2)	1–0	Fleetwood Town (3)	Burnley
19:30 GMT	Roberts 90'	Report		Stadium: Turf Moor; Attendance: 15,987; Referee: Dean Whitestone

1 March 2023	Manchester United (1)	3–1	West Ham United (1)	Trafford
19:45 GMT	Aguerd 77' (o.g.); Garnacho 90'; Fred 90+5'	Report	Benrahma 54'	Stadium: Old Trafford; Attendance: 72,571; Referee: Michael Salisbury

1 March 2023	Sheffield United (2)	1–0	Tottenham Hotspur (1)	Sheffield
19:55 GMT	Ndiaye 79'	Report		Stadium: Bramall Lane; Attendance: 28,308; Referee: John Brooks

== Quarter-finals ==
The draw for the quarter-finals took place on 1 March 2023. This round included one team from the fourth tier, the lowest-ranked team remaining in the competition: Grimsby Town. Grimsby were the first fourth-tier side to reach the quarter-finals since Cambridge United in 1990.

18 March 2023	Manchester City (1)	6–0	Burnley (2)	Manchester
17:45	Haaland 32', 35', 59'; Álvarez 62', 73'; Palmer 68'	Report		Stadium: City of Manchester Stadium; Attendance: 51,688; Referee: John Brooks

19 March 2023	Sheffield United (2)	3–2	Blackburn Rovers (2)	Sheffield
12:00	Gallagher 28' (o.g.); McBurnie 81'; Doyle 90+1'	Report	Brereton 21' (pen.); Szmodics 60'	Stadium: Bramall Lane; Attendance: 25,814; Referee: Tim Robinson

19 March 2023	Brighton & Hove Albion (1)	5–0	Grimsby Town (4)	Brighton & Hove
14:15	Undav 6'; Ferguson 51', 70'; March 82'; Mitoma 90'	Report		Stadium: Falmer Stadium; Attendance: 29,415; Referee: Jarred Gillett

19 March 2023	Manchester United (1)	3–1	Fulham (1)	Trafford
16:30	Fernandes 75' (pen.), 90+6'; Sabitzer 77'	Report	Mitrović 50'	Stadium: Old Trafford; Attendance: 73,511; Referee: Chris Kavanagh

== Semi-finals ==
The draw for the semi-finals took place on 19 March 2023 on BBC One, after Brighton & Hove Albion's victory over Grimsby Town. This round, decided in one match, which was played at Wembley Stadium, included one team from the second-tier EFL Championship: Sheffield United.

22 April 2023	Manchester City (1)	3–0	Sheffield United (2)	London
16:45	Mahrez 43' (pen.), 61', 66'	Report		Stadium: Wembley Stadium; Attendance: 69,603; Referee: Stuart Attwell

23 April 2023	Brighton & Hove Albion (1)	0–0 (a.e.t.) (6–7 p)	Manchester United (1)	London
16:30		Report		Stadium: Wembley Stadium; Attendance: 81,445; Referee: Craig Pawson
	Penalties
	Mac Allister (penalty scored); Groß (penalty scored); Undav (penalty scored); Estupiñán (penalty scored); Dunk (penalty scored); Webster (penalty scored); March (penalty missed)		(penalty scored) Casemiro; (penalty scored) Dalot; (penalty scored) Sancho; (penalty scored) Rashford; (penalty scored) Sabitzer; (penalty scored) Weghorst; (penalty scored) Lindelöf

== Final ==
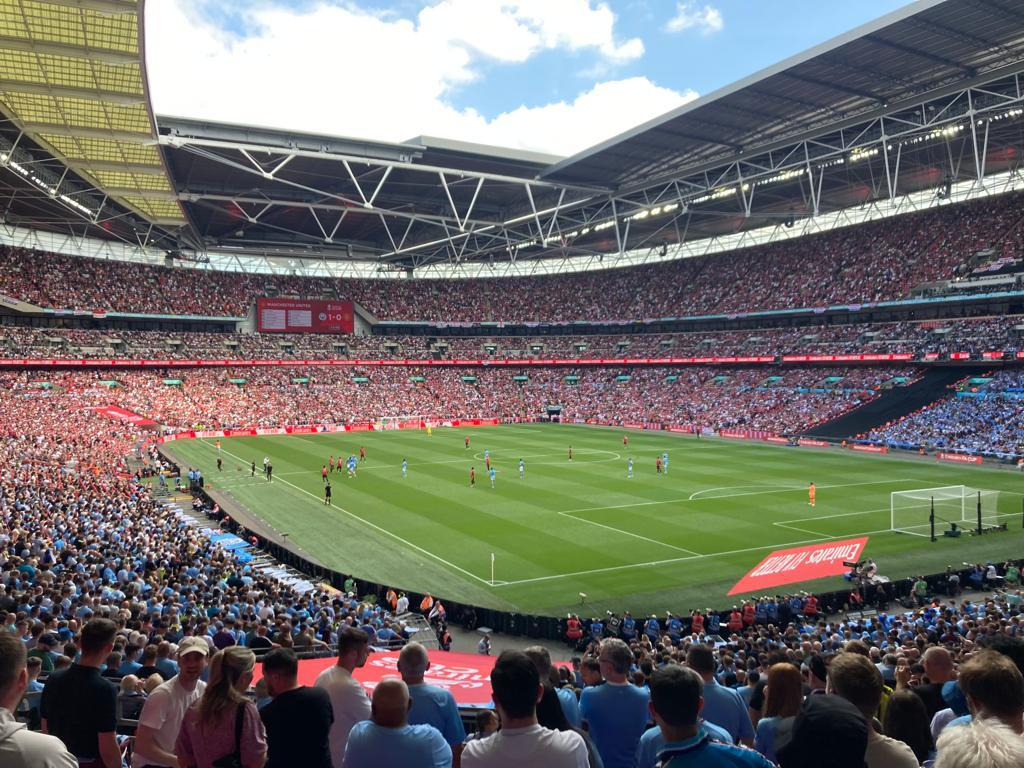
The Wembley Stadium during the 2023 FA Cup final between Manchester City and Manchester United

3 June 2023
15:00 BST

Manchester City	2–1	Manchester United
Gündoğan 1', 51'	Report	Fernandes 33' (pen.)

Wembley Stadium, London
Attendance: 83,179
Referee: Paul Tierney (Lancashire)

== Top scorers ==
Following the conclusion of the competition, Wrexham player Paul Mullin was awarded the FA Cup Golden Ball Award, commemorating him as the top scorer of the season from the extra preliminary round through to the final with eight goals.

Rank	Player	Club	Goals
1	(England) Paul Mullin	Wrexham	8
2	(Algeria) Riyad Mahrez	Manchester City	5
3	(Albania) Armando Dobra	Chesterfield	4
4	(Argentina) Julián Álvarez	Manchester City	3
4	(England) Sam Bell	Bristol City	3
4	(England) Colby Bishop	Portsmouth	3
4	(Wales) Billy Bodin	Oxford United	3
4	(England) Conor Chaplin	Ipswich Town	3
4	(England) Will Collar	Stockport County	3
4	(Republic of Ireland) Evan Ferguson	Brighton & Hove Albion	3
4	(Portugal) Bruno Fernandes	Manchester United	3
4	(England) Phil Foden	Manchester City	3
4	(Norway) Erling Haaland	Manchester City	3
4	(Republic of Ireland) Gavan Holohan	Grimsby Town	3
4	(Nigeria) Kelechi Iheanacho	Leicester City	3
4	(England) Luke Norris	Stevenage	3
4	(England) Deji Oshilaja	Burton Albion	3
4	(Denmark) William Osula	Derby County	3
4	(Northern Ireland) Jamie Reid	Stevenage	3
4	(England) Josh Umerah	Hartlepool United	3
4	(England) Shaun Whalley	Accrington Stanley	3
4	(England) Connor Wickham	Forest Green Rovers	3
4	(England) Josh Windass	Sheffield Wednesday	3

== Television rights ==
The domestic broadcasting rights for the competition were held by the BBC, who had held them since the 2014–15 season, and ITV, who were showing matches for the second successive season. Both of these broadcasters will air the tournament until the 2024–25 season, and both were permitted to show the final live. In addition, FA Cup matches could also be streamed on ESPN+.

Broadcaster	Summary
BBC Sport	18 live matches per season, with highlights of the 2022 FA Community Shield. BBC Sport has second and third picks of matches in the second round, fourth round and the quarter-finals, as well as first and fourth pick of matches for the first, third and fifth rounds, and first pick of the semi-finals.
ITV Sport	At least 20 live matches per season, plus live coverage of the 2022 FA Community Shield. ITV had first pick and fourth pick of matches in the second round, fourth round and the quarter-finals, as well as second and third picks for the first, third and fifth rounds and second pick of the semi-finals. ITV1 games are also carried on STV.

Additional matches featuring Welsh clubs could feature on BBC Wales or on Welsh language channel S4C.

Round	Date	Teams	Kick-off	Channels	
Round	Date	Teams	Kick-off	Digital	TV
First round	4 November	Hereford v Portsmouth	19:55	BBC iPlayer	BBC Two
First round	5 November	South Shields v Forest Green Rovers	12:00	BBC iPlayer	BBC One
First round	6 November	Wrexham v Oldham Athletic	12:30	ITV Hub	ITV1; UTV
First round	6 November	Wrexham v Oldham Athletic	12:30	STV Player	STV
First round	6 November	Torquay United v Derby County	15:00	ITV Hub	ITV1; UTV
First round	6 November	Torquay United v Derby County	15:00	STV Player	STV
First round	7 November	Bracknell Town v Ipswich Town	19:45	ITV Hub	ITV4
First round (Replay)	15 November	Derby County v Torquay United	19:45	BBC iPlayer	BBC Three
First round (Replay)	16 November	Salford City v Peterborough United	19:45	ITV Hub	ITV4
Second round	26 November	King's Lynn Town v Stevenage	12:45	BBC iPlayer	BBC One
Second round	26 November	Forest Green Rovers v Alvechurch	15:00	BBC iPlayer	BBC One
Second round	26 November	Wrexham v Farnborough	15:15	S4C Clic	S4C
Second round	27 November	Ebbsfleet United v Fleetwood Town	12:30	ITV Hub	ITV1; UTV
Second round	27 November	Ebbsfleet United v Fleetwood Town	12:30	STV Player	STV
Second round	27 November	Newport County v Derby County	15:15	ITV Hub	ITV1; UTV
Second round	27 November	Newport County v Derby County	15:15	STV Player	STV
Second round (Replay)	7 December	Stockport County v Charlton Athletic	19:45	ITV Hub	ITV4
Second round (Replay)	8 December	Gillingham v Dagenham & Redbridge	19:45	BBC iPlayer	BBC Three
Third round	6 January	Manchester United v Everton	20:00	ITVX	ITV1; UTV
Third round	6 January	Manchester United v Everton	20:00	STV Player	STV
Third round	7 January	Gillingham v Leicester City	12:30	BBC iPlayer	BBC One
Third round	7 January	Tottenham Hotspur v Portsmouth	12:30	BBC iPlayer	—N/a
Third round	7 January	Coventry City v Wrexham	17:30	S4C Clic	S4C
Third round	7 January	Sheffield Wednesday v Newcastle United	18:00	BBC iPlayer	BBC One
Third round	7 January	Liverpool v Wolverhampton Wanderers	20:00	ITVX	ITV4
Third round	8 January	Cardiff City v Leeds United	14:00	ITVX	ITV1; UTV
Third round	8 January	Cardiff City v Leeds United	14:00	STV Player	STV
Third round	8 January	Manchester City v Chelsea	16:30	BBC iPlayer	BBC One
Third round	8 January	Aston Villa v Stevenage	16:30	BBC iPlayer	—N/a
Third round	9 January	Oxford United v Arsenal	20:00	ITVX	ITV1; UTV
Third round	9 January	Oxford United v Arsenal	20:00	STV Player	STV
Third round (Replay)	17 January	Wolverhampton Wanderers v Liverpool	19:45	BBC iPlayer	BBC One
Third round (Replay)	18 January	Leeds United v Cardiff City	19:45	ITVX	ITV4
Fourth round	27 January	Manchester City v Arsenal	20:00	ITVX	ITV1; UTV
Fourth round	27 January	Manchester City v Arsenal	20:00	STV Player	STV
Fourth round	28 January	Accrington Stanley v Leeds United	12:30	BBC iPlayer	BBC One
Fourth round	28 January	Walsall v Leicester City	12:30	BBC iPlayer	—N/a
Fourth round	28 January	Preston North End v Tottenham Hotspur	18:00	BBC iPlayer	BBC One
Fourth round	28 January	Manchester United v Reading	20:00	ITVX	ITV4
Fourth round	29 January	Brighton & Hove Albion v Liverpool	13:30	ITVX	ITV1; UTV
Fourth round	29 January	Brighton & Hove Albion v Liverpool	13:30	STV Player	STV
Fourth round	29 January	Wrexham v Sheffield United	16:30	BBC iPlayer	BBC One
Fourth round	30 January	Derby County v West Ham United	19:45	ITVX	ITV4
Fourth round (Replay)	7 February	Sheffield United v Wrexham	19:45	ITVX	ITV4
Fourth round (Replay)	8 February	Sunderland v Fulham	19:45	BBC iPlayer	BBC One
Fifth round	28 February	Stoke City v Brighton & Hove Albion	19:15	ITVX	ITV4
Fifth round	28 February	Leicester City v Blackburn Rovers	19:30	BBC iPlayer	—N/a
Fifth round	28 February	Fulham v Leeds United	19:45	BBC iPlayer	BBC One
Fifth round	28 February	Bristol City v Manchester City	20:00	ITVX	ITV1; UTV
Fifth round	28 February	Bristol City v Manchester City	20:00	STV Player	STV
Fifth round	1 March	Southampton v Grimsby Town	19:15	ITVX	ITV4
Fifth round	1 March	Burnley v Fleetwood Town	19:30	BBC iPlayer	—N/a
Fifth round	1 March	Manchester United v West Ham United	19:45	ITVX	ITV1; UTV
Fifth round	1 March	Manchester United v West Ham United	19:45	STV Player	STV
Fifth round	1 March	Sheffield United v Tottenham Hotspur	19:55	BBC iPlayer	BBC One
Quarter-Finals	18 March	Manchester City v Burnley	17:45	BBC iPlayer	BBC One
Quarter-Finals	19 March	Sheffield United v Blackburn Rovers	12:00	ITVX	ITV1; UTV
Quarter-Finals	19 March	Sheffield United v Blackburn Rovers	12:00	STV Player	STV
Quarter-Finals	19 March	Brighton & Hove Albion v Grimsby Town	14:15	BBC iPlayer	BBC One
Quarter-Finals	19 March	Manchester United v Fulham	16:30	ITVX	ITV1; UTV
Quarter-Finals	19 March	Manchester United v Fulham	16:30	STV Player	STV
Semi-finals	22 April	Manchester City v Sheffield United	16:45	ITVX	ITV1; UTV
Semi-finals	22 April	Manchester City v Sheffield United	16:45	STV Player	STV
Semi-finals	23 April	Brighton & Hove Albion v Manchester United	16:30	BBC iPlayer	BBC One
Final	3 June	Manchester City v Manchester United	15:00	BBC iPlayer	BBC One
Final	3 June	Manchester City v Manchester United	15:00	ITVX	ITV1; UTV
Final	3 June	Manchester City v Manchester United	15:00	STV Player	STV
