= Garnock Way =

- Opening titles
- Genre: Soap opera
- Written by: Jack Gerson
- Theme music composer: Arthur Blake
- Country of origin: Scotland
- Original language: English
- No. of episodes: 173

Production
- Executive producer: Bryan Izzard
- Running time: 30 minutes (including adverts)
- Production company: Scottish Television

Original release
- Network: ITV
- Release: 1 April 1976 – 12 July 1979

Related
- Take the High Road

Garnock Way is a short-lived Scottish soap opera, produced by Scottish Television for the ITV network, running from 1976 to 1979. It was replaced by Take the High Road, which also featured cast members Eileen McCallum, Bill Henderson, William Armour, Jackie Farrell, Paul Kermack, Michael Elder, and John Stahl.

== History ==
Garnock Way was set in a mining community in a town halfway between Glasgow and Edinburgh. It was deemed to be too gritty for network consumption, which resulted in only certain stations broadcasting the series.

In the summer of 1979 Garnock Way was axed and replaced by Take the High Road, which was a bigger budget affair and more in keeping with the 'tartan' perception of Scotland as it was deliberately set in a more beautiful part of Scotland.

In 2010 it was announced that Garnock Way would be one of the STV archive programmes soon to be available on YouTube. The STV Player channel on the video-sharing website launched on 20 August 2010. However, just four episodes of the series are known to exist, and these are available on the STV Player.

== Transmissions ==
Only a few ITV stations broadcast the series:

- Southern Television from June 1976 until September 1977
- HTV throughout 1977
- Border Television From late 1976 until Summer 1979
- UTV From March 1977 until Summer 1979

== Characters ==
- Jean Ross – Eileen McCallum
- Alex Ross – Gerard Slevin
- Tod Baxter – Bill Henderson
- Mary Baxter – Terry Cavers
- Louise Baxter – Harriet Buchan
- Jock Nesbit – Paul Kermack
- Willie Mclean – William Armour
- Hughie Ross – Alan Watters
- Sandra Cully – Dorothy Paul
- Cully – Jackie Farrell
- Cliff Hewitt – George Howell
- Effie Murdoch – Ginni Barlow
- Harry Murdoch – Bill McCabe
- Carla the café owner – Ida Schuster
- Det Sgt Golspie – Michael Elder
- PC Scoular – John Stahl
- Georgina Munro – Jan Wilson

The outside scenes depicting the characters' houses were filmed in Charles Street, Torbothie, an area of Shotts in North Lanarkshire. The still picture at the start of the programme, showing the street with the monument, is of the Mercat Cross in Airth.
