= Paul Kermack =

Scottish actor (1932–1990)

- Born: George Stewart Auchinleck; 3 March 1932; Queenston Bank, Dirleton, East Lothian, Scotland
- Died: 17 March 1990 (aged 58); Glasgow
- Occupation: actor
- Years active: 1959–1990
- Spouse: Jeni
- Children: 2

George Stewart Auchinleck (3 March 1932 – 17 March 1990), known professionally as Paul Kermack, was a Scottish television actor who is best known for playing Archie Menzies in Take the High Road from 1980 until he died, suddenly, from a heart attack on 17 March 1990.

Kermack studied drama at the Rose Bruford College in London. His ambition was to become an opera singer but, lacking the necessary vocal range for leading roles, he decided to become a full-time actor instead. Like several of his colleagues in Take the High Road, he had a long career in Scottish theatre, playing a wide variety of roles.

He made his TV debut in 1961 and went on to make guest appearances in several drama programmes, including four in Dr. Finlay's Casebook and three in Sutherland's Law. He frequently played police officers. He was Jamie's father, Mr Knox, in the Bill Douglas trilogy of My Childhood (1972), My Ain Folk (1973) and My Way Home (1978). In 1976, he was cast as Jock Nesbit in Garnock Way and, when that series was axed in 1979, he was offered the role of workshy handyman Archie Menzies in Take the High Road.

== Bibliography ==
- Elder, Michael (1990). Ten Years of Take the High Road. London: Boxtree. ISBN 978-1-85283-109-7.
