= Take the High Road =

British TV soap (1980–2003)

- Opening titles
- Genre: Soap opera
- Created by: Don Houghton
- Country of origin: Scotland
- Original language: English
- No. of episodes: 1,517 (+3 specials)

Production
- Producers: Clarke Tait (1980–1981); Brian Mahoney (1981–1990); Frank Cox (1991–1993); John G. Temple (1994–1998); Liz Lake (1998–1999); Mark Grindle (1999–2003)
- Running time: 30 minutes (1× 45 min Hogmanay special; 2× 60 min Millennium special)
- Production company: Scottish Television

Original release
- Network: ITV
- Release: 19 February 1980 – 27 April 2003

Take the High Road (renamed High Road from 1994 to 2003) is a Scottish soap opera produced by Scottish Television, which started in February 1980 as an ITV daytime programme, and was broadcast until 2003. It was set in the fictional village of Glendarroch, Scotland, with exteriors filmed in the village of Luss on the banks of Loch Lomond.

The series was dropped by most ITV stations in the 1990s, while Scottish, Grampian, Border and Ulster stations continued to screen it until its last episode. From April 2020, the entire series was made available to stream to UK viewers on the STV Player app.

== History ==
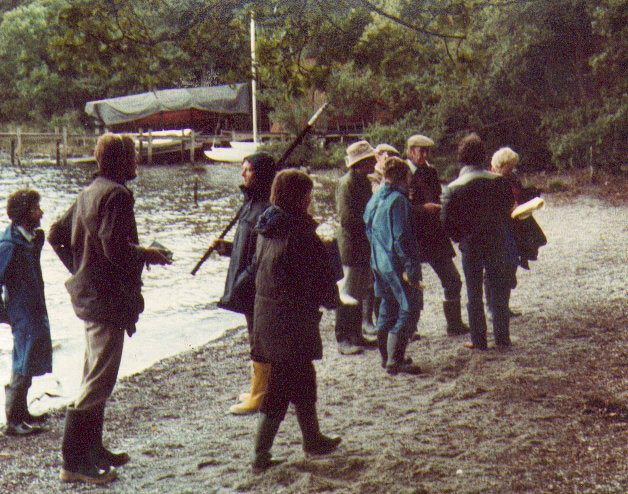
Location crew on Loch Lomond at Millarochy Bay, Balmaha. This was the first of two locations for the 'Boathouse'; because of access difficulties, the scenes were eventually switched to the west side of the Loch at Rossdhu House (1984)

=== Origins ===
In 1979, the ITV network decided its daytime schedule would be improved by the inclusion of a soap opera set in Scotland. At the time the only soap opera being made by any of the three Scottish regional companies was Scottish Television's Garnock Way, set in a Central Belt mining community between Glasgow and Edinburgh. It had been running in Scotland for three years but was dropped for a new concept to feature a more picturesque view of rural Scotland, with "lots of lochs and hills". It was decided its replacement should focus on a highland estate community, comprising a village and several farms. As Michael Elder puts it, the series would have a scenic backdrop against which the everyday events would be set.

As the original name for the setting was 'Glendhu', and focused on the role of its estate manager, known in Scotland as a factor, the proposed title was The Glendhu Factor. The network disliked the village name and rejected the title, thinking its meaning was unclear. As a result, the setting was renamed 'Glendarroch'. Although the factor was a main character for the first two years, a bigger concept was that of the "lady laird", who became a virtual constant. The first lady laird was upper-class Elizabeth Cunningham (Edith MacArthur), but the mantle eventually passed via middle-class Sam Hagen (Briony McRoberts), a businesswoman, to working-class Sarah MacDonald (Shonagh Price), a down-to-Earth young mother whose office desk was the kitchen table. After the village of Luss, on the western shore of Loch Lomond, was proposed as a filming location, the title Take the High Road was suggested by the folk song about the area, "The Bonnie Banks o' Loch Lomond" which contains the line "O ye'll tak' the high road, and I'll tak' the low road".

Production began in late 1979 once Garnock Way was axed.

=== Links to Garnock Way ===
Producers sought to keep the audience of Garnock Way by featuring some of its key cast members in Take the High Road and suggesting continuity by having a character, Todd the garage mechanic, played by Bill Henderson, leave Garnock Way to set up business in the highlands. As a direct cross-over was not possible, a similar character (Ken Calder) with the same origin story was created, and played by the same actor in Take the High Road. Henderson was followed by Garnock Way colleagues Eileen McCallum, William Armour, Jackie Farrell, Paul Kermack, Michael Elder, and John Stahl.

=== Production and changes ===
The main writer was series creator Don Houghton with many early scripts written by actor Michael Elder, who played Dr Wallace in the show. Until 1986, the series broadcast for 40 weeks of the year, with a break in the first quarter of the year. Themes broadly reflected a nostalgic view of Scottish highland culture through relationships between crofters and villagers, the gentry and an estate manager (or 'factor').It aired in Sri Lanka.

Dramatic use was made of the external threats of commercialisation, tourism and redevelopment. Historically one family had owned the estate, the village and neighbouring crofts and farms. The series begins with their struggle to resist plans to convert Glendarroch into a leisure resort for wealthy tourists. In 2005, this scenario was echoed when Donald Trump bought and decimated an Aberdeenshire estate to build a controversial golf resort.

In March 1990, the series was revamped to appeal to a younger audience which jarred with the sense of authenticity of a Scottish village. Within six months, the changes were considered successful and enabled stronger story lines and the introduction of new characters.

Take the High Road was the only soap for the ITV network which was not made by one of the "Big Five" companies. (Note: The so-called "Big Five" of the ITV network were, at that time, Central, Granada, LWT, Thames and Yorkshire.) This helped to give Scotland an identity on the network and also provide sufficient revenue to help STV to produce more programmes for ITV and Channel 4.

=== Dropped by the ITV network ===
When ITV reviewed all long-standing series made by ITV companies in 1993, it became apparent regions outside of Scotland were months behind in their transmissions, suggesting a lower demand. On 2 June 1993, Marcus Plantin, ITV's network director, announced Take the High Road would be dropped from English schedules from September 1993, as 'ITV's statisticians believed English audiences have had enough'. This resulted in public protest, as many believed that without the support of English ITV companies, the Scottish series had no future. The issue was raised in parliament under early day motions, and the Daily Record held a protest.

By the end of June, Scottish Television resolved to continue producing the series regardless and it was reclassified as a product other ITV networks could purchase as a cheaper rate. To cut costs, the number of episodes was cut and the cast took a reduction in salaries. When English viewers campaigned to their local broadcasters to keep the series nearly all ITV companies agreed, except Carlton, Central, Tyne Tees and Yorkshire, who ceased transmitting it from 7 September 1993. Subsequently, popular demand forced Carlton to reinstate the series from 16 October 1993, and Central from 5 November 1993. The two companies that initially declined to reinstate the series, Tyne Tees Television and Yorkshire Television, eventually brought it back in early 1996, screening it from where they left off.

On 22 July 1994 the series' name was permanently shortened to High Road, the name viewers knew it by colloquially.

From 1995 the number of ITV areas broadcasting the soap gradually reduced; however, some did complete the series:

- Meridian until 16 December 1995 and Anglia until 19 December 1995.
- Yorkshire, Tyne Tees, HTV and Granada until Christmas 1997, the latter showed the series on a primetime slot during the whole of 1997.
- Carlton until Christmas 1998.
- Central and Westcountry until Friday 24 May 2002.
- Border completed the series in 2003.
- UTV completed the series in 2004.

By October 2000 Scottish Television had run up a larger stockpile of unaired episodes, with many believing the series was about to get axed although this was denied by the broadcaster. In April 2001, STV announced that High Road would be reviewed in 2002. The last episode of the series was screened in April 2003.

== Theme tune ==
The original theme was written by composer Arthur Blake, STV's Musical Director. The first instrumental version was recorded by Silly Wizard and used until 1982 reflected the Scottish folk themes. This was replaced by an orchestral version from Episode 127 on August 1982 until episode 334 in 1985. Instruments featured included the oboe, clarinet, violin, and drum kit. While this version was in use, the music for the break strings tended to vary from episode to episode. Like the Silly Wizard version, the music for the closing credits also featured a drum roll introduction.

The third version was a different orchestral arrangement and was used from episode 335 in 1986 until episode 727 at the beginning of 1990. This new orchestral version was more violin led than the former, which had made more use of wind instruments, and featured no percussion.

From episode 728 in 1990, the fourth, rock-style, version made its debut and continued to be used until the end of the series. This version was electric guitar led (played by session guitarist Duncan Finlay) and featured percussion during the "middle" section. From 1994 when the programme name was shortened to High Road, the length of the closing credits was cut, so the closing theme was faded in just before the middle eight.

== Broadcasting ==
=== STV series ===
Dates are for Scottish Television, which on some occasions was ahead of the ITV network daytime showing.

- Series 1: 19 February 1980 – 28 May 1980: episodes 1–30
- Series 2: 14 October 1980 – 7 January 1981: episodes 31–56
- Series 3: 7 April 1981 – 2 July 1981: episodes 57–82
- Series 4: 6 October 1981 – 18 March 1982: episodes 83–126
- Series 5: 24 August 1982 – 23 December 1982: episodes 127–162
- Series 6: 5 July 1983 – 20 March 1984: episodes 163–234
- Series 7: 4 September 1984 – 7 February 1985: episodes 235–276
- Series 8: 14 May 1985 – 28 November 1985: episodes 277–334
- Series 9: 18 March 1986 – 18 December 1986 to episodes 335–415
- 3 March 1987 – 27 April 2003: episodes 416–1517.

From February 1987 onward, the series was broadcast all year round twice a week. In May 1993 the series became weekly in Scotland, due to the fact that English stations were 20 episodes behind. From September the series also become weekly in the rest of the UK, which still resulted in gap 8 weeks. Later in the run, however, there were several gaps during which the series was not shown, although the storylines continued uninterrupted each time the series resumed. The gaps were from 12 September to 22 October 2000; from 16 April to 12 May 2001; from June to August 2001; from 24 September to 27 October 2001; from 18 February to 6 April 2002; from June to September 2002; and in February 2003.

=== Regional scheduling ===
Take the High Road was broadcast by all ITV companies when it started in 1980. Nearly all regions broadcast Take the High Road during the daytime, except for Scottish Television who broadcast the soap in the early evenings around 7.00pm, instead of Emmerdale. From 1984 Border Television moved the series to a peak-time slot. Grampian Television did the same too in September 1987.

=== International ===
Take the High Road was broadcast in a number of countries around the world, including Canada, the United States and New Zealand. In Australia, it was broadcast on ABC1. In Ireland, the series was shown five days a week from the beginning on RTÉ One. As episodes caught up with the UK transmissions, the number of broadcasts were reduced. In 1984, a deal was announced with Saudi Arabia for 260 episodes that had aired over the previous four years It aired in Sri Lanka too.

=== Repeats ===
Take the High Road was repeated on Sky Soap; the episodes starting from 1 November 1996 were from the beginning, and 1989 episodes were being shown when the channel ended in April 1999. Early episodes from about 1994–95 were shown on Sky Scottish in 1997/98. It was repeated briefly on Life One from February 2008. This channel began with episode 1000 from 1992 but it ceased broadcasting after only six weeks having shown only four episodes.

In the autumn of 2010, STV added nearly every episode to its YouTube channel, making the series accessible to viewers across the world. It was removed once it began repeating on STV's new local channel, STV Glasgow from 3 June 2014, broadcasting one episode each weekday, with an omnibus at the weekends. The series was also shown on STV Edinburgh from its launch in January 2015. When STV Glasgow & STV Edinburgh were renamed STV2, the series was moved to a Saturday morning between 9am and 11am until June 2018, when the STV2 channel closed down. STV continued to make the series available online via the STV Player, from the same point where STV2 left off. Five episodes were uploaded every week from 8 July 2018 on Sundays. From 14 September 2019, this increased to five episodes each Saturday and five episodes each Sunday. This run ended after the final episodes were uploaded on 18 April 2020. On 26 April 2020, STV began another complete rerun of by loading five episodes a week onto its STV Player app, which was completed on 17 December 2025. In July 2021, selected episodes from the series were made available on BritBox, a subscription-only service curated by the BBC and ITV.

==== Current availability ====
On 25 December 2025, STV began its third complete rerun of the series by repeating the same practice of loading five episodes a week onto its STV Player app. They are free to watch for UK viewers. Each block of five episodes remains available for six months.

== Sponsorship ==
During its network transmission Take the High Road was sponsored by Brooke Bond and Scottish Blend tea from the beginning of 1992 until 1995 and Mother's Pride from August 1999 to September 2001 on Scottish and Grampian TV. The STV Player rerun has been sponsored by Tunnock's bakery, McDonald's, and ScotRail, among others.

== Media ==
=== Books ===
Novelisations of broadcast episodes were published from 1982, with a production special in 1990:

- Summer's Gloaming by Don Houghton (November 1982)
- Danger in the Glen by Michael Elder (January 1984)
- Mist on the Moorland by Michael Elder (1985)
- The Man From France by Michael Elder (1986)
- The Last of the Lairds by Michael Elder (May 1987)
- 10 Years of Take the High Road by Michael Elder (1990)

=== DVD releases ===
Take the High Road became available for the first time ever when distribution company Go Entertain commenced releasing the series in 2012 on DVD.

Rights to the series were later acquired by Alba Home Entertainment in 2013, with sets released in the same format, with the exception of each set now available with one disc. The series ceased releasing in 2014 after 16 volumes and 96 episodes, possibly due to poor sales. It is currently unknown if any future sets will become available.

In an unusual occurrence, the series was not rated by the BBFC for home video release, which is normally the case for all television series and films. It received an 'E' (Exempt from classification) rating, an unofficial rating only applied to documentaries or sports events released on home video.

Title	Year	Episodes	No. of discs	Release date (Region 2)	Ref
Volume 1	1980	1–6	2	1 October 2012	
Volume 2	1980	7–12	2	24 October 2012	
Volume 3	1980	13–18	2	12 November 2012	
Volume 4	1980	19–24	2	4 March 2013	
Volume 5	1980	25–30	2	25 March 2013	
Volume 6	1981	31–36	1	27 May 2013	
Volume 7	1981	37–42	1	24 June 2013	
Volume 8	1981	43–48	1	9 September 2013	
Volume 9	1981	49–54	1	21 October 2013	
Volume 10	1981	55–60	1	20 January 2014	
Volume 11	1981	61–66	1	14 April 2014	
Volume 12	1981	67–72	1	14 April 2014	
Volume 13	1981	73–78	1	14 July 2014	
Volume 14	1981	79–84	1	14 July 2014	
Volumes 1–10: Collector's Edition	1980–81	1–60	15	13 October 2014	
Volume 15	1981	85–90	1	27 October 2014	
Volume 16	1981	91–96	1	27 October 2014	

== Bibliography ==
- Elder, Michael (1990). Ten Years of Take the High Road. London: Boxtree. ISBN 978-1-85283-109-7.
- Houghton, Don (1982). Take the High Road. Edinburgh: Mainstream. ISBN 978-0-906391-34-1.
