= Zak Emmerson =

English footballer

Personal information
- Full name: Zak Ben Emmerson
- Date of birth: 10 August 2004 (age 22)
- Place of birth: Cheshire, England
- Position: Forward

Team information
- Current team: Chester (on loan from FC Halifax Town)
- Number: 21

Youth career
- –2019: Oldham Athletic

Senior career*
Years	Team	Apps	(Gls)
2019–2020	Oldham Athletic	2	(0)
2020–2022	Brighton & Hove Albion	0	(0)
2022–2024	Blackpool	0	(0)
2023–2024	→ Eastbourne Borough (loan)	11	(5)
2024–	FC Halifax Town	34	(4)
2026–	→ Chester (loan)	1	(0)

International career^{‡}
2021	England U18	2	(0)
- * Club domestic league appearances and goals as of 17:00, 10 January 2026 (UTC) ‡ National team caps and goals as of 10:43, 10 October 2021 (UTC)

Zak Ben Emmerson (born 12 August 2004) is an English professional footballer who plays as a forward for National league North club Chester, on loan from Halifax Town.

== Career ==
On 22 October 2019, Emmerson made his debut for Oldham Athletic as an 85th minute substitute in a 2–0 win against Walsall. Upon doing so, Emmerson became the second-youngest player in English Football League history at 15 years and 73 days old, 28 days older than the record youngest player Reuben Noble-Lazarus.

On 15 July 2020, Emmerson joined the academy and development squad of Premier League side Brighton & Hove Albion for an undisclosed fee.

On 1 September 2022, Emmerson joined EFL Championship club Blackpool for an undisclosed fee.

On 23 July 2024, Emmerson joined FC Halifax Town from Blackpool for an undisclosed fee.

On 9 January 2026, Emmerson joined Chester FC on a loan deal until the end of the season. Emmerson made his debut for Chester on 10 January 2026 in a 1-0 loss away at Scarbourough Athletic, he came off injured in the 39th minute with a hamstring injury.

== International career ==
On 3 September 2021, Emmerson made his England U18s debut during a 1–1 draw with Wales at Newport International Sports Village.

== Career statistics ==
As of match played 16 December 2025

Appearances and goals by club, season and competition
Club	Season	League			FA Cup		League Cup		Other		Total	
Club	Season	Division	Apps	Goals	Apps	Goals	Apps	Goals	Apps	Goals	Apps	Goals
Oldham Athletic	2019–20	League Two	2	0	0	0	0	0	1 (Note: Appearance(s) in EFL Trophy)	0	3	0
Brighton & Hove Albion	2020–21	Premier League	0	0	0	0	0	0	0	0	0	0
Brighton & Hove Albion	2021–22	Premier League	0	0	0	0	0	0	0	0	0	0
Brighton & Hove Albion	Total		0	0	0	0	0	0	0	0	0	0
Blackpool	2022–23	Championship	0	0	0	0	0	0	0	0	0	0
Blackpool	2023–24	League One	0	0	0	0	0	0	0	0	0	0
Blackpool	Total		0	0	0	0	0	0	0	0	0	0
Eastbourne Borough (loan)	2023–24	National League South	11	5	1	0	—		1 (Note: Appearance(s) in the Sussex Senior Cup)	0	13	5
FC Halifax Town	2024–25	National League	33	4	0	0	—		4 (Note: One appearance in National League play-offs, three appearances in National League Cup)	1	37	5
FC Halifax Town	2025–26	National League	1	0	0	0	—		2 (Note: Two appearances in National League Cup)	0	3	0
FC Halifax Town	Total		34	4	0	0	0	0	6	1	40	5
Career total			47	9	1	0	0	0	8	1	56	10
