= Simon Sadler =

Simon Sadler (b. 1968, UK) is a professor in the Department of Design and in the Art History Program at the University of California, Davis. His publications focus on histories, theories and ideologies of architecture, design and urbanism since the mid-twentieth century, and include studies of the Archigram group, the Situationists, and counterculture.

He keynoted at the Design History Society (2017), the “Alteration” symposium at the Moderna Museet, Stockholm (2011), the Architectural Humanities Research Association (2011), and the 1st International Conference on Structures and Architecture, Guimarães (2010), and was the discussant with Michael Pollan at the Berkeley Art Museum (2017). He was an Andrew W. Mellon Researcher at the Canadian Centre for Architecture, Montreal (2014-16) and a Fellow of the Paul Mellon Centre for Studies in British Art, London (2002).

== Publications ==
- Archigram: Architecture without Architecture, Cambridge, Massachusetts: MIT Press, 2005
- Non-Plan: Essays on Freedom, Participation and Change in Modern Architecture and Urbanism, Oxford: Architectural Press, 2000 (edited with Jonathan Hughes)
- The Situationist City, Cambridge, Massachusetts: MIT Press, 1998
- “That Sea Ranch Feeling,” in Jennifer Dunlop Fletcher and Joseph Becker, eds., The Sea Ranch: Architecture, Environment, and Idealism, San Francisco: San Francisco Museum of Modern Art / DelMonico / Prestel, 2018, pp. 66-88
- “The Bateson Building, Sacramento, California, 1977–81, and the Design of a New Age State,” Journal of the Society of Architectural Historians vol. 75, no. 4 (December 2016), pp. 469–489
- “Tools of Oneness,” in Justin McGuirk, Brendan McGetrick, eds., California Designing Freedom, London: Design Museum / Phaidon Press, 2017, pp. 156-163
- “Mandalas or Raised Fists? Hippie Holism, Panther Totality, and Another Modernism,” in Andrew Blauvelt, ed., Hippie Modernism: The Struggle for Utopia, Minneapolis: Walker Art Center, 2015, pp. 114-125
- “Archigram’s Los Angeles: Sentimentality for the Future,” in Sylvia Lavin with Kimberli Meyer, eds., Everything Loose Will Land: 1970s Art and Architecture in Los Angeles, Los Angeles: MAK Center and Verlag für moderne Kunst Nürnberg, 2013, pp. 56-61
- “The Dome and the Shack: The Dialectics of Hippie Enlightenment,” in Iain Boal, Janferie Stone, Michael Watts, Cal Winslow, eds., West of Eden: Communes and Utopia in Northern California, Oakland: PM Press / Retort, 2012
- “Diagrams of Countercultural Architecture,” Design and Culture, vol. 4, no. 3, November 2012, pp. 345-367
- “A Culture of Connection,” Boom: A Journal of California, vol. 2, no. 1, 2012, pp. 1–16
- “British Architecture in the Sixties,” in Chris Stephens and Katharine Stout, eds., Art & the 60s: This Was Tomorrow, London: Tate, 2004, pp. 116-133
- "An Architecture of the Whole," Journal of Architectural Education, vol. 61, no. 4, 2008, pp. 108–129
- "Drop City Revisited," Journal of Architectural Education, vol. 58, 2006
