= Charlie Patino =

English footballer (born 2003)

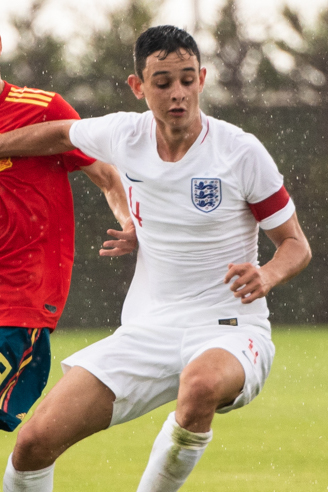
- Patino in 2019

Personal information
- Full name: Charlie Michael Patino
- Date of birth: 17 October 2003 (age 23)
- Place of birth: Watford, England
- Height: 1.83 m (6 ft 0 in)
- Position: Midfielder

Team information
- Current team: VfL Bochum (on loan from Deportivo A Coruña)
- Number: 28

Youth career
- 2010–2011: St Albans City
- 2011–2015: Luton Town
- 2015–2021: Arsenal

Senior career*
Years	Team	Apps	(Gls)
2021–2024	Arsenal	0	(0)
2022–2023	→ Blackpool (loan)	34	(2)
2023–2024	→ Swansea City (loan)	33	(3)
2024–	Deportivo A Coruña	35	(0)
2026–	→ VfL Bochum (loan)	0	(0)

International career^{‡}
2018	England U15	5	(0)
2018–2019	England U16	8	(2)
2019	England U17	3	(0)
2021	England U19	1	(0)
2022	England U20	3	(1)
2023	England U21	2	(0)
- * Club domestic league appearances and goals as of 31 May 2026 ‡ National team caps and goals as of 22:45, 6 July 2025 (UTC)

Charlie Michael Patino (born 17 October 2003) is an English professional footballer who plays as a midfielder for 2. Bundesliga club VfL Bochum, on loan from La Liga club Deportivo A Coruña.

== Club career ==
=== Early career ===
Born in Watford, Patino started his career at St Albans City, before joining Luton Town at the age of seven. At 11 years old he signed for Arsenal in 2015 for a £10,000 fee.

=== Arsenal ===
Patino rose quickly through the ranks at Arsenal, featuring for the under-18 side at the age of only 14. He was seen as one of Arsenal's most promising youth prospects, with head of scouting at Arsenal, Sean O'Connor, describing him as the "best player who has ever walked through the doors at Hale End", and Arsenal scout Brian Stapleton calling him "the best kid I've ever seen."

He signed his first professional contract with Arsenal in October 2020. In the same month, he was included in The Guardian's "Next Generation" 2020 list, as one of the best young players emerging from Premier League clubs' academies. On 21 December, Patino made his senior debut for Arsenal in a 5–1 EFL Cup quarter-final victory against Sunderland, scoring the final goal of the game at the end of the second-half, shortly after replacing fellow academy graduate Emile Smith Rowe. On 9 January 2022, Patino was a starter in a 1–0 FA Cup third-round loss to Nottingham Forest.

==== Loan to Blackpool ====
On 3 August 2022, Patino signed on loan for Blackpool for the duration of the 2022–23 season. He made his debut on 6 August at Stoke City, replacing Lewis Fiorini in the second half. Three days later, he made his first start on his home debut against Barrow in the EFL Cup first round.

Patino scored his first goal for Blackpool on 17 September in their 2–1 defeat at Millwall. He also scored once and provided an assist for Jerry Yates in the 4–2 win against West Lancashire rivals Preston North End at Bloomfield Road.

==== Loan to Swansea City ====
On 11 August 2023, Swansea City announced they had signed Patino on a season-long loan. He made his debut the following day in a 3–2 defeat at West Bromwich Albion, coming on as a substitute for Harrison Ashby and providing an assist for Harry Darling. A week later, he made his first start and home debut against Coventry City.

He scored his first goal for the club in a 3–0 win against Sheffield Wednesday on 23 September.

=== Deportivo La Coruña ===
On 26 August 2024, Deportivo La Coruña announced they had signed Patino on a four-year contract.

==== Loan to VfL Bochum ====
On 31 August 2026, Patino was loaned to 2. Bundesliga side VfL Bochum for one year.

== International career ==
Patino has represented England at under-15, under-16 and under-17 level. He remains eligible for Spain due to his father's Spanish heritage and being born in Galicia, and the Spanish FA have reportedly made attempts to get him to switch allegiance.

On 9 October 2021, Patino made his debut for the England U19s during a 3–1 victory against Mexico in Marbella.

On 21 September 2022, Patino made his England U20 debut as a substitute during a 3–0 victory over Chile at the Pinatar Arena.

On 11 September 2023, Patino made his England U21 debut as a substitute during a 3–0 2025 UEFA European Under-21 Championship qualification win away to Luxembourg.

== Style of play ==
A ball-playing midfielder, Patino has stated that former Arsenal players Santi Cazorla and Cesc Fàbregas are influences in his style of play. Through his youth career, he was dubbed 'the next Frenkie De Jong' by fans, as his playstyle was seen as 'eerily close' to the former Ajax midfielder.

== Media ==
Patino was involved in the Amazon Original sports docuseries All or Nothing: Arsenal, which documented the club by spending time with the coaching staff and players behind the scenes both on and off the field throughout their 2021–22 season.

Patino also appeared on Series 1 of the docuseries Inside Hale End, which documented Arsenal's academy set-up and gave an exclusive view into the Hale End campus, featuring interviews with players and coaching staff.

== Career statistics ==
As of match played 31 May 2026

Appearances and goals by club, season and competition
Club	Season	League			National cup (Note: Includes FA Cup, Copa del Rey)		League cup (Note: Includes EFL Cup)		Other		Total	
Club	Season	Division	Apps	Goals	Apps	Goals	Apps	Goals	Apps	Goals	Apps	Goals
Arsenal U21	2021–22	—			—		—		3 (Note: Appearances in EFL Trophy)	0	3	0
Arsenal	2021–22	Premier League	0	0	1	0	1	1	0	0	2	1
Blackpool (loan)	2022–23	Championship	34	2	2	1	1	0	—		37	3
Swansea (loan)	2023–24	Championship	33	3	2	1	0	0	—		35	4
Deportivo de La Coruña	2024–25	Segunda División	7	0	1	0	—		—		8	0
Deportivo de La Coruña	2025–26	Segunda División	28	0	3	0	—		—		31	0
Deportivo de La Coruña	2026–27	La Liga	0	0	0	0	—		—		0	0
Deportivo de La Coruña	Total		35	0	4	0	—		—		39	0
Career total			102	5	9	2	2	1	3	0	116	8

== Personal life ==
Patiño also holds Spanish citizenship, his full name in that document being Charlie Michael Patiño Higgs. (Note: In this Spanish name, the first or paternal surname is Patiño and the second or maternal family name is Higgs.)
