= STV Player =

Free Ad-funded streaming service based in UK

- Screenshot STV Player - TV you'll love for free
- Developer: STV Group plc
- Release: July 2009
- Operating system: Windows, Mac, Linux
- Platform: Windows, macOS, Linux, iOS, Android, AirPlay, Amazon Fire TV, Android TV, Apple TV, Chromecast, Freesat, Freeview Play, Now, Roku, Sky Glass, Sky Go, Sky TV, Samsung Smart TV, Virgin Media, YouView
- Available in: English
- Type: Television catch-up, archive, exclusive content, live broadcast
- Website: player.stv.tv

STV Player is a video on demand service owned by STV Group and available free-of-charge across the UK, online, on mobile and on all major TV platforms, including Sky Glass, Amazon Fire TV, Roku, Apple TV, Android TV, Freeview Play, Freesat and Virgin Media.

Officially launched in July 2009 following a soft launch the previous year, STV Player was initially established as an online catch-up service for viewers of the STV channel in Scotland. The platform has since rolled out UK-wide as an advertising-based video on demand (AVOD) service with a focus on international drama box sets. In February 2019, STV Player+ was launched, allowing viewers with a monthly subscription to stream and download Player content without pre-roll or mid-roll advertising.

In January 2021, after launching on Sky Q in all four nations of the UK the previous month, STV Player reported that its monthly active user base had grown by a fifth and online viewing on the platform had doubled year-on-year. It was nominated for "best on demand service of the year" at the Edinburgh International Television Festival's annual awards ceremony in 2021.

== Programming ==
STV Player provides a combination of Channel 3 network content such as Coronation Street, The Masked Singer and I'm a Celebrity...Get Me Out of Here!, home-grown productions such as Scotland Tonight and Taggart, and international drama box sets including The Bridge, Janet King and Ice. Channel 3 network content is not available to viewers outside North and Central Scotland, as ITVX owns the rights to show this in ITV plc regions.

In April 2020, STV announced plans to provide every episode of classic soap opera Take the High Road, produced by its production arm STV Studios between 1980 and 2003, on STV Player.

A content deal with distributor Banijay in July 2021, described at the time as STV Player's "biggest ever", brought over 1,200 hours of new drama and factual programming to the platform for viewers across the UK.

In January 2023, STV Player signed a deal with distributor All3Media to become the first streaming service to provide every episode of classic soap Brookside since it was cancelled by Channel 4 in 2003. Original cast members Claire Sweeney and Sunetra Sarker praised the decision to relaunch the show on STV Player.

In 2025, it was announced that STV Player would start streaming new episodes of New Zealand soap Shortland Street in line with New Zealand from 17 February 2025, 15 years after its last air date in the UK.

== Streaming issues ==
In April 2014, STV Player experienced downtime during its broadcast of Salmond & Darling: The Debate—the first televised debate for the 2014 Scottish independence referendum. STV had secured exclusive rights to the broadcast, and refused to offer it to any other broadcaster (including the BBC and Sky News), while STV's network ITV did not choose to pick up the live airing of the debate across the rest of the UK (excluding the ITV Border region), Unfortunately, a configuration issue with a large scale third party providing content distribution for the event prevented audience members from watching parts of the broadcast. STV apologized for the issues, while BBC Parliament aired the full debate broadcast the next day.

== Supported platforms ==
The website uses Brightcove Flash technology, similar to that used by the services provided by the BBC and Channel 4. It is available on various operating systems, including Windows, Mac and Linux, and multiple web browsers, such as Chrome, Firefox and Safari.

An Android app was released on 9 September 2011, and iOS on 22 December 2011.

STV Player launched on Freesat in October 2016, and on Sky UK in November 2019.

In December 2020, it was announced that STV Player would be installed on Now TV devices, automatically appear on the home screens for all users. At the same time STV Player becomes available UK wide to Sky Q customers.

STV launched UK wide on the Virgin Media platform in June 2020
