= 2021–22 Blackpool F.C. season =

English football club season

Blackpool
2021–22 season
- Owner and chairman: Simon Sadler
- Head coach: Neil Critchley
- Stadium: Bloomfield Road
- Championship: 16th
- FA Cup: Third round
- EFL Cup: Second round
- Top goalscorer: League: Gary Madine (9); All: Shayne Lavery (10)
Home colours	Away colours	Third colours

The 2021–22 Blackpool F.C. season was the club's 113th season in the English Football League, and their first season back in the EFL Championship, the second tier of English professional football, after winning the EFL League One play-offs. The season covered the period from 1 July 2021 to 30 June 2022. It was head coach Neil Critchley's second full season in charge.

Blackpool began the season by picking up two points from a possible 15 during August, with draws at Bristol City and Bournemouth, and defeats at home to Cardiff City and Coventry City and at Millwall. They reached the second round of the EFL Cup, after beating Middlesbrough in the first round, but exited at the hands of Sunderland. They finished August in 22nd place in the Championship table.

By contrast, Blackpool lost only once in September. In the league, they claimed ten points out of a possible 15, with victories at home to Fulham and Barnsley, and at Middlesbrough. A 3–0 home defeat to Huddersfield Town and a 1–1 draw at Hull City were the other two results. September was closed out with the club in 14th place in the table.

In October, the club's uptick in form continued as they won four of their five Championship fixtures, beating Blackburn Rovers (home), Reading (away), local rivals Preston North End and newly relegated Sheffield United (away). They lost at Nottingham Forest in the second fixture of the run. They finished October in sixth place in the table.

November returned three points from a possible fifteen, after three draws (at home to Q.P.R. and West Brom, and at Swansea City) were bookended by defeats at home to Stoke City and at Birmingham City. They finished November in 11th place in the table. Neil Critchley also signed a new, four-year contract with the club this month.

From the fifteen points available during December, Blackpool picked up three, from a 3–1 home victory over Peterborough United. Defeats occurred at home to Luton Town, at Derby County and Huddersfield, and at home to Middlesbrough. They finished the year in 13th place, albeit having played several games more than the teams around them.

In contrast to the end of 2021, Blackpool began the first month of 2022 unbeaten (in the league, at least), after consecutive single-goal home victories against Hull City and Millwall, followed up with a draw at league leaders Fulham. They exited the FA Cup at the third-round stage (the round in which they entered) on 8 January, at the hands of Hartlepool United.

February returned eight points from a possible eighteen, with wins at home to Bristol City and Reading, draws at Coventry City and Cardiff City and defeats at home to Bournemouth and at QPR.

Blackpool began March with two successive single-goal victories, at Stoke City and at home to Swansea City. A goalless draw, at Sheffield United, followed. Due to an international break, only nine points were available in March, of which Blackpool picked up seven.

April proved to be slim pickings for points, with only eight obtained from a possible 24. Victories came at home to Birmingham City and at Barnsley; draws were gained at Blackburn Rovers and Luton Town; while the four defeats came at home to Nottingham Forest, at Preston and West Bromwich Albion, and at home to Derby County.

Since Blackpool had eight fixtures in April, they had only one in the final month of the season. They lost 5–0 at already relegated Peterborough United, a result for which Neil Critchley and captain Chris Maxwell apologised to the travelling fans. They finished the season in 16th place in the Championship.

== Pre-season ==
Blackpool announced they would have friendly matches against Squires Gate, Southport, Newport County, Rangers, Carlisle United, Burnley, Bamber Bridge and Morecambe as part of the club's pre-season preparations.

Accrington Stanley replaced Newport County in a change that was made on 16 July. The same day, the planned friendly against Bamber Bridge was cancelled.

Irish defender Richard Keogh joined the club on 17 July following his release by Huddersfield Town.

The Rangers friendly was cancelled on 19 July after a COVID-19 outbreak amongst the Blackpool squad.

Former Scotland international Stuart McCall joined the club as assistant head coach to Neil Critchley on 22 July 2021, replacing the departed Colin Calderwood. McCall's father, Andy, played for the club in the 1940s and 1950s, and his sister was born in the town.

Striker Tyreece John-Jules joined on a season-long loan from Arsenal on 29 July.

A behind-closed-doors friendly was arranged against Manchester City on 3 August.

=== Results ===
Blackpool's visit to nearby Squires Gate on 9 July ended in a 7–0 victory for the Tangerines, the goals coming from seven different players: Harrison, Mariette, Matshazi, Francis, Bange, Yelegon and Nyame.

Another local derby, at Southport, the following day saw Blackpool win 2–0. The goals came from Demetri Mitchell and new signing Shayne Lavery. The visitors, who named different starting line-ups for each half, played most of the second with ten men, after CJ Hamilton went off with an injury.

A visit to Accrington Stanley on 17 July ended in a 3–1 defeat. Demetri Mitchell scored the visitors' goal, from the penalty spot. The same day, veteran defender Richard Keogh joined the club on a free transfer.

Blackpool travelled north to face Carlisle United on 24 July. Demetri Mitchell scored his third goal in the four fixtures in what was the only goal of the game.

On 27 July, Burnley visited Bloomfield Road, and they returned east with a single-goal victory.

On 29 July, 20-year-old forward Tyreece John-Jules joined on loan from Arsenal for the season.

Pre-season continued with a 1–1 draw at Morecambe on 31 July (the visitors' goal coming from CJ Hamilton) and concluded with a 4–1 defeat at Premier League champions Manchester City on 3 August. Luke Garbutt scored Blackpool's goal from the penalty spot.

"It was so demanding. I was really impressed with Blackpool – they have a young side with quality. They lost two or three balls in the build-up in the first minutes, but continued to do it. They did really well. We played against a good side – they did very well in many things, especially in the build-up. We had to do things to regain the ball as quick as possible."

— Manchester City manager Pep Guardiola after the match

==== In detail ====
9 July 2021 Friendly	Squires Gate	0–7	Blackpool XI	Squires Gate
19:30 BST		Report	Harrison 22'; Mariette 35'; Matshazi 57'; Francis 72'; Bange 79'; Yelegon 81'; Nyame 83'	Stadium: School Road

10 July 2021 Friendly	Southport	0–2	Blackpool	Blowick
15:00 BST		Report	Mitchell 6'; Lavery 76'	Stadium: Pure Stadium

17 July 2021 Friendly	Accrington Stanley	3–1	Blackpool	Behind-closed-doors
12:30 BST		Report	Mitchell (pen.)	Attendance: 0

21 July 2021 Friendly	Blackpool	P–P	Rangers	Blackpool
19:00 BST				Stadium: Bloomfield Road
Note: Match was later cancelled.

24 July 2021 Friendly	Carlisle United	0–1	Blackpool	Carlisle
15:00 BST		Report	Mitchell 35'	Stadium: Brunton Park

27 July 2021 Friendly	Blackpool	0–1	Burnley	Blackpool
19:45 BST		Report	Thomas 15'	Stadium: Bloomfield Road

30 July 2021 Friendly	Bamber Bridge	P–P	Blackpool XI	Bamber Bridge
19:30 BST				Stadium: Sir Tom Finney Stadium
Note: Match was later cancelled.

31 July 2021 Friendly	Morecambe	1–1	Blackpool	Morecambe
15:00 BST	McDonald 19'	Report	Hamilton 56'	Stadium: Mazuma Stadium

3 August 2021 Friendly	Manchester City	4–1	Blackpool	Manchester
18:00 BST	Edozie 3'; Mahrez 48'; Gundogan 58', 76'	Report	Garbutt 21' (pen.)	Stadium: Academy Stadium; Attendance: 0

== Season proper ==
=== August ===
Blackpool opened their league campaign with a 1–1 draw at Nigel Pearson's Bristol City on 7 August. Chris Martin put the hosts ahead just before the interval, and the score remained that way until the fourth minute of injury time, when second-half substitute Shayne Lavery scored on his debut. Blackpool were eighth place at the final whistle, but dropped to thirteenth after the remaining fixtures were played.

Middlesbrough visited Bloomfield Road in the first round of the EFL Cup on 11 August. Blackpool won 3–0, with goals from Callum Connolly, Shayne Lavery and Keshi Anderson.

On 13 August, Ewan Bange was loaned out to Bamber Bridge.

Mick McCarthy's Cardiff City were next up at the seaside, and they returned to Wales with all three points after a 2–0 victory.

A second-successive Championship defeat followed on 17 August, 1–0 at home at the hands of Coventry City. Blackpool did climb, to 22nd, after other results that evening.

Blackpool made the long trip to Bournemouth on 21 August, and found themselves two goals down inside twenty minutes after a double from Dominic Solanke. Goals from James Husband and Jerry Yates (penalty) levelled matters, giving the visitors their second point from a possible twelve since the start of the league campaign.

Three days later, Blackpool exited the EFL Cup at the second-round stage after losing 3–2 at home to Sunderland, whose Aiden O'Brien rounded out his hat-trick with a 92nd-minute winner.

A third League defeat in Blackpool's opening five fixtures occurred at Millwall on 28 August. The visitors' Callum Connolly was sent off on 14 minutes, but Blackpool took the lead, with Shayne Lavery's fourth goal of the season, eleven minutes into the second half. Jed Wallace levelled for the Lions on 63 minutes from a free-kick. Jake Cooper scored the winner in the final minute.

On transfer-deadline day, 31 August, Blackpool brought in four players: Jordan Gabriel (returning after being on loan at the club the previous season) in a permanent, four-year deal, while Ryan Wintle (Cardiff City), Dujon Sterling (Chelsea) and Owen Dale (Crewe Alexandra) joined on loan.

=== September ===
On 9 September, Blackpool named their 25-man squad. Due to injuries to Matty Virtue, Grant Ward and Gary Madine, three spaces were left open.

The squad:

Goalkeepers: Daniel Grimshaw, Chris Maxwell, Stuart Moore. Defenders: Callum Connolly, Marvin Ekpiteta, Jordan Gabriel, Luke Garbutt, Daniel Gretarsson, James Husband, Reece James, Richard Keogh, Dujon Sterling (loan). Midfielders: Keshi Anderson, Josh Bowler, Owen Dale (loan), Kenny Dougall, Demetri Mitchell, Kevin Stewart, Ryan Wintle (loan). Forwards: Tyreece John-Jules (loan), Shayne Lavery, Jerry Yates. Gary Madine, injured since last season, was registered just before the Huddersfield fixture on 14 September. He was named on the bench for that match.

The under-21s:

Goalkeepers: Charlie Monks. Defenders: Oliver Casey, Ryan Grant, Cameron Hill, Sky Sinclair. Midfielders: Cameron Antwi, Rob Apter, Sonny Carey, Luke Mariette, Matthew Liptrott. Forwards: Ewan Bange, Brad Holmes, Johnny Johnston.

Also on 9 September, youth defender Charlie Penman joined Brighton and Hove Albion for an undisclosed fee.

Division leaders Fulham visited Bloomfield Road on 11 September. Josh Bowler's second-half strike gave Blackpool their first League win of the season, while also handing the visitors their first League defeat. The hosts climbed three places to 19th.

A 3–0 home defeat followed to Huddersfield Town on 14 September.

Blackpool's second league victory of the campaign was achieved at Middlesbrough on 18 September. Marcus Tavernier put Boro ahead inside ten minutes, but a goal from Marvin Ekpiteta and own goal by former Blackpool loanee Grant Hall gave Blackpool the three points.

A second consecutive victory followed at home to Barnsley on 25 September. Shayne Lavery's 32nd-minute strike was the only goal of the game. Blackpool climbed to 14th place.

A trip to Hull City resulted in a 1–1 draw, after Blackpool led for over half the game and despite the hosts being reduced to ten men with twenty minutes remaining. Shayne Lavery scored for Blackpool.

=== October ===
Blackpool opened October with a 2–1 home victory over East Lancashire neighbours Blackburn Rovers, their first victory over Tony Mowbray's side in nine years. Shayne Lavery scored his seventh goal in all domestic competitions the opening strike on four minutes. He pulled his hamstring shortly afterwards, and his substitute Jerry Yates double the hosts' lead twenty minutes later. Ben Brereton halved Rovers' deficit five minutes into the second half, but Blackpool held on for their fourth victory in their last six League fixtures. They climbed to 12th place.

On 7 October 2021, Australian international Kenny Dougall signed a new two-year contract with the club.

An unbeaten run of four games came to an end at the City Ground on 16 October as Nottingham Forest won their third Championship fixture in a row. Blackpool dropped three places to 15th.

Three points were picked up at Reading's Madejski Stadium on 20 October, despite being two goals down at half time. Second-half strikes from debutant Owen Dale and a double from Jerry Yates turned the scoreline around. The visitors climbed three places to 12th.

A second-consecutive victory followed three days later in a West Lancashire derby clash with Preston North End at Bloomfield Road, the first such fixture since February 2010 and Blackpool's first victory over their rivals in 24 years. Goals from Keshi Anderson and Gary Madine (his first goal in nine months) gave Blackpool the three points, as they climbed to 11th in the table. There were ten bookings and one dismissal. The visitors' Alan Browne saw red deep in injury time for his part in a post-tackle scuffle.

Blackpool finished October with a third-straight victory, defeating Sheffield United at Bramall Lane by a single goal. Keshi Anderson found the net for the second-consecutive match as the visitors climbed five places to sixth with the three points.

=== November ===
The fourth month of the season began with a single-goal home defeat to Stoke City. Blackpool dropped four places to tenth.

Blackpool held onto tenth place after a 1–1 draw with QPR at Bloomfield Road on 6 November. Gary Madine scored his second goal of the season (and the 100th of his career), from the penalty spot, after the visitors had gone ahead.

On 9 November, Ewan Bange joined AFC Telford on loan.

After an international break, another draw followed at Swansea City on 20 November. Keshi Anderson levelled for the visitors in the second half with his fourth goal of the season. Blackpool remained in tenth position.

A third-successive draw, this time goalless, followed on 23 November against West Bromwich Albion. Blackpool climbed one place to ninth with the result, but dropped to 11th after the following evening's games.

On 25 November, assistant head coach Stuart McCall left Blackpool to become assistant manager to Paul Heckingbottom at Sheffield United.

The final game of the month was a single-goal defeat at Birmingham City on 27 November. Blackpool dropped to 11th place with the result.

=== December ===
Blackpool dropped four places to 15th after a 3–0 home defeat to Luton Town on 4 December.

A third-straight defeat, at Wayne Rooney's bottom side Derby County, followed on 10 December. Their fourth defeat in their last seven games, Blackpool dropped two places to 17th.

A 3–1 victory over Peterborough United on 18 December lifted the Seasiders five places to 12th, although several matches were postponed after a COVID-19 outbreak across the country.

Two consecutives defeats followed — at Huddersfield Town on 27 December and, two days later, at home to Middlesbrough.

=== January ===
2022 was rung in with a single-goal victory over Hull City at Bloomfield Road, Gary Madine's penalty just after the half-hour mark proving decisive. Blackpool climbed to 12th place with the three points, although they had now played four more games than the teams immediately below them and three more than the two teams above them.

On 3 January, Ryan Wintle returned to Cardiff City after being recalled. Meanwhile, fellow midfielder Rob Apter was loaned out to Chester, initially until 31 January, but this was later extended until the end of the season. Four days later, another midfielder, Matthew Liptrott, joined Stalybridge Celtic, while right-back Jack Moore joined Radcliffe, both on loan.

Blackpool exited the FA Cup at the first hurdle, after losing 2–1 at Hartlepool United on 8 January in a third-round tie.

Jake Beesley joined the club, for an undisclosed fee, from Rochdale on 10 January. The following day, midfielder Tayt Trusty joined Radcliffe on loan, linking up with his Blackpool teammate Jack Moore.

On 13 January, Owen Dale, having briefly returned to Crewe at the end of his four-month loan spell, made his move to Blackpool permanent.

On 17 January, Tyreece John-Jules had his loan from Arsenal ended, having not featured for several months, while Ethan Robson was recalled from his season-long loan at MK Dons. The following day, Teddy Howe was released by mutual consent.

Ewan Bange was loaned out, for the third time, on 21 January, this time to F.C. United of Manchester.

Returning to league duty on 22 January, Blackpool beat Millwall by a single Shayne Lavery goal to make it three victories in their last five league games. Blackpool remained 12th.

On 24 January, Jordan Thorniley was recalled from his loan at Oxford United. He filled the spot in Blackpool's 25-man squad that was made by Demetri Mitchell's departure to Hibernian later the same day.

Two days later, Oliver Sarkic became the second player this month to have his contract mutually terminated. He was one of four of-age players not registered in the club's 25-man squad. The other three being Joe Nuttall, Bez Lubala and the long-term-injured Grant Ward.

Winger Charlie Kirk joined, initially on loan until the end of the season, from Charlton Athletic on 27 January.

On 29 January, Blackpool picked up a point at table-toppers Fulham. They ended the month in 14th place.

Transfer-deadline day saw three outgoings: Joe Nuttall departed for Scunthorpe United for an undisclosed fee; Sky Sinclair headed out on loan for the second time, this time to Nantwich Town until March; and Bez Lubala went on loan to Northampton Town until the end of the season. There was one arrival: centre-back Douglas Tharme from Southport. He was immediately loaned back to the Sandgrounders until the end of the season.

=== February ===
Blackpool made it ten points out of a possible twelve over their last four matches with a 3–1 home victory over Bristol City on 5 February. CJ Hamilton opened the scoring, followed two minutes later by a header from Gary Madine. Josh Bowler, subject of a £3-million bid on transfer-deadline day, made it three just after the restart. Bristol City pulled one back five minutes from time. The match had eight bookings, evenly split between the two clubs. Blackpool climbed to 13th.

A 1–1 draw at Coventry City on 8 February made it five games unbeaten. Gary Madine put the visitors ahead, his second goal in as many games. Blackpool dropped one place to 14th.

The following day, 45-year-old Iain Brunskill was installed as assistant head coach to Neil Critchley. Brunskill had formerly been Liverpool's Assistant Academy Technical Director for a decade.

On 12 February, Blackpool hosted second-placed Bournemouth. After taking the lead through Josh Bowler, with his third goal in four matches, the visitors scored two late goals to take the three points. It was Blackpool's first league defeat of 2022.

A visit to Cardiff on 19 February resulted in a point from a 1–1 draw.

A midweek visit to the capital to face QPR saw the Tangerines returning home with a defeat, after conceding a goal to Luke Amos in the final minute of normal time.

On 26 February, Paul Ince and Tom Ince returned to Bloomfield Road with Reading. After going behind, the Seasiders came back to win 4–1, with goals from Marvin Ekpiteta, Gary Madine, Shayne Lavery and Josh Bowler.

=== March ===
Josh Bowler scored the only goal of the game, and his sixth in his last eight games, as Blackpool beat Stoke City at the Bet365 Stadium. They climbed to 14th with the three points.

On 12 March, Blackpool attained three consecutive league victories for the second time in the campaign with a single-goal scoreline at home Swansea City. Gary Madine scored after four minutes, lifting the Tangerines two places to 12th.

Four days later, Sheffield United travelled over the Pennines for Blackpool's final game before a two-week break. In what was Neil Critchley's 100th match as Blackpool manager, the spoils were shared in a goalless draw.

=== April ===
After a two-and-a-half-week break, Blackpool hosted Nottingham Forest on 2 April. The visitors won 4–1, with Callum Connolly scoring the Tangerines' consolation in the closing stages. Blackpool dropped one place to 14th.

On 5 April, Blackpool travelled to Preston North End. They lost by a single goal, and dropped two places to 16th.

Four days later, they were involved in another Lancashire derby, this time at Blackburn Rovers. The match finished 1–1, with Blackpool's goal, an equaliser, coming from the boot of Marvin Ekpiteta. It was his fourth goal of the season. Blackpool remained 16th.

A third defeat in four matches, this time at West Bromwich Albion, was followed by a 6–1 victory over Birmingham City at Bloomfield Road on 18 April. Jake Beesley, on his first start at home, scored twice, with the other four goals coming from CJ Hamilton, Kenny Dougall (his first since the play-off final of the previous season), a penalty from Jerry Yates and a 35-yard free-kick from Callum Connolly.

Gary Madine signed a one-year extension to his contract on 16 April, with an option for a further twelve months.

On 23 April, Blackpool drew 1–1 at Luton Town, Gary Madine scoring from the penalty spot for the visitors.

Blackpool travelled to Barnsley on 26 April. Goals from Owen Dale and Oliver Casey gave Blackpool the three points. They climbed one place to 15th, above arch-rivals Preston North End, with the three points. Matty Virtue made his first start for the club in over a year, having been out injured.

Four days later, Blackpool rounded off their home campaign with a 2–0 defeat to Derby County. Gary Madine missed a penalty that would have put the hosts ahead.

=== May ===
On 7 May, Blackpool travelled to Peterborough United for their final fixture of the campaign. Posh, already relegated to League One, won 5-0. After the match, both Neil Critchley and captain Chris Maxwell apologised to the travelling fans for what was described as their "worst display" of the season. Blackpool finished 16th in the Championship.

Three days later, the club announced its retained list for the following season. Released were goalkeeper Charlie Monks, defenders Ryan Grant and Sky Sinclair (son of former Seasider Trevor Sinclair), midfielders Cameron Antwi, Matthew Liptrott, Ethan Robson and Grant Ward, and forward Johnny Johnston. Contract options were exercised on goalkeeper Stuart Moore, defenders Richard Keogh and Jordan Thorniley, midfielders Keshi Anderson and Josh Bowler, and forwards Ewan Bange and Brad Holmes. Loanees Charlie Kirk (Charlton Athletic) and Dujon Sterling (Chelsea) returned to their respective clubs.

=== Competitions ===
==== League table ====
Pos	Team	Pld	W	D	L	GF	GA	GD	Pts
13	Preston North End	46	16	16	14	52	56	−4	64
14	Stoke City	46	17	11	18	57	52	+5	62
15	Swansea City	46	16	13	17	58	68	−10	61
16	Blackpool	46	16	12	18	54	58	−4	60
17	Bristol City	46	15	10	21	62	77	−15	55
18	Cardiff City	46	15	8	23	50	68	−18	53
19	Hull City	46	14	9	23	41	54	−13	51

Source: EFL Official Website
Rules for classification: 1) Points; 2) Goal difference; 3) Number of goals scored; 4) Head-to-head results; 5) Wins; 6) Away goals; 7) Penalty points (sec 9.5); 8) 12-point sending off offences

===== Results summary =====
Overall								Home						Away					
Pld	W	D	L	GF	GA	GD	Pts	W	D	L	GF	GA	GD	W	D	L	GF	GA	GD
46	16	12	18	54	58	−4	60	11	3	9	29	26	+3	5	9	9	25	32	−7

Last updated: 7 May 2022.

===== Results by matchday =====
Matchday	1	2	3	4	5	6	7	8	9	10	11	12	13	14	15	16	17	18	19	20	21	22	23	24	25	26	27	28	29	30	31	32	33	34	35	36	37	38	39	40	41	42	43	44	45	46
Home/away	A	H	H	A	A	H	H	A	H	A	H	A	A	H	A	H	H	A	H	A	H	A	H	A	H	H	H	A	H	A	H	A	A	H	A	H	H	H	A	A	A	H	A	A	H	A
Result	D	L	L	D	L	W	L	W	W	D	W	L	W	W	W	L	D	D	D	L	L	L	W	L	L	W	W	D	W	D	L	D	L	W	W	W	D	L	L	D	L	W	D	W	L	L
Position	10	21	21	22	22	19	22	20	14	14	12	15	12	11	6	10	10	10	11	11	15	17	13	13	13	12	12	14	13	14	14	15	15	14	14	12	13	14	16	16	16	16	16	15	16	16

Updated to match(es) played on 7 May 2022. Source: https://www.bbc.com/sport/football/championship/table
A = Away; H = Home; W = Win; D = Draw; L = Loss

===== In detail =====
The Seasiders' fixtures were announced on 24 June 2021.

7 August 2021 1	Bristol City	1–1	Blackpool	Ashton Gate
15:00 BST	Martin 44'; Baker (yellow card) 64'; Bell (yellow card) 90+2'	Report	Lavery 90+3'	Stadium: Ashton Gate Stadium; Attendance: 18,729 (1,122 away); Referee: Andy Davies

14 August 2021 2	Blackpool	0–2	Cardiff City	Blackpool
15:00 BST	Husband (yellow card) 90+2'	Report	Bacuna 52'; Moore 86'	Stadium: Bloomfield Road; Attendance: 11,393; Referee: Andy Woolmer

17 August 2021 3	Blackpool	0–1	Coventry City	Blackpool
19:45 BST	Lavery (yellow card) 6'; Keogh (yellow card) 13'; Connolly (yellow card) 59'	Report	O'Hare (yellow card) 45'; Gyökeres 45+2'; Maatsen (yellow card) 47'; Clarke-Salter (yellow card) 70'; Waghorn (yellow card) 80'	Stadium: Bloomfield Road; Attendance: 11,608; Referee: Keith Stroud

21 August 2021 4	Bournemouth	2–2	Blackpool	Bournemouth
15:00 BST	Solanke 6', 19'	Report	Garbutt (yellow card) 8'; John-Jules (yellow card) 38'; Connolly (yellow card) 42'; Husband 57'; Yates 60' (pen.); Ekpiteta (yellow card) 84'	Stadium: Vitality Stadium; Attendance: 9,187 (657 away); Referee: Steve Martin

28 August 2021 5	Millwall	2–1	Blackpool	Bermondsey
15:00 BST	Mitchell (yellow card) 50'; Saville (yellow card) 62'; Wallace 63'; Malone (yellow card) 69'; Kieftenbeld (yellow card) 74'; Cooper 90'	Report	Connolly (red card) 14'; Dougall (yellow card) 28'; Lavery 56'; Yates (yellow card) 62'; Anderson (yellow card) 74'	Stadium: The Den; Attendance: 11,049; Referee: Gavin Ward

11 September 2021 6	Blackpool	1–0	Fulham	Blackpool
15:00 BST	Bowler 49'; Stewart (yellow card) 53'; Lawrence-Gabriel (yellow card) 86'; Garbutt (yellow card) 90+2'	Report	Quina (yellow card) 59'; Reed (yellow card) 73'; Odoi (yellow card) 79'	Stadium: Bloomfield Road; Attendance: 11,268; Referee: John Busby

14 September 2021 7	Blackpool	0–3	Huddersfield Town	Blackpool
19:45 BST		Report	Pearson (yellow card) 34', (goal) 54'; Koroma 48'; Hogg 62'	Stadium: Bloomfield Road; Attendance: 11,277; Referee: Thomas Bramall

18 September 2021 8	Middlesbrough	1–2	Blackpool	Middlesbrough
15:00 BST	Tavernier 8'; Fry (yellow card) 12'; Crooks (yellow card) 35'	Report	Ekpiteta 62'; Hall 78' (o.g.); Gabriel (yellow card) 90+4'	Stadium: Riverside Stadium; Attendance: 21,022; Referee: David Webb

25 September 2021 9	Blackpool	1–0	Barnsley	Blackpool
15:00 BST	Lavery 32'; Wintle (yellow card) 64'	Report	Moon (yellow card) 58'; Benson (yellow card) 70'; Leya Iseka (yellow card) 89'	Stadium: Bloomfield Road; Attendance: 12,698; Referee: Steve Martin

28 September 2021 10	Hull City	1–1	Blackpool	Kingston upon Hull
19:45 BST	Wilks (yellow card) 38'; Coyle (yellow card) 45+2' (yellow-red card) 80'; Eaves 84'	Report	Lavery 42', (yellow card) 82'; Garbutt (yellow card) 68'	Stadium: MKM Stadium; Attendance: 10,189; Referee: Matt Donohue

2 October 2021 11	Blackpool	2–1	Blackburn Rovers	Blackpool
15:00 BST	Lavery 4'; Yates 24'; Ekpiteta (yellow card) 46'; Wintle (yellow card) 87'; Bowler (yellow card) 90+5'	Report	Ayala (yellow card) 25'; Brereton 50'	Stadium: Bloomfield Road; Attendance: 13,419; Referee: Josh Smith

16 October 2021 12	Nottingham Forest	2–1	Blackpool	West Bridgford
15:00 BST	Zinckernagel (yellow card) 20'; Johnson 22'; Grabban 61'; McKenna (yellow card) 82'	Report	Yates 53'	Stadium: City Ground; Attendance: 27,946 (1,795 away); Referee: Kevin Friend

20 October 2021 13	Reading	2–3	Blackpool	Reading
20:00 BST	Dann 11'; Dele-Bashiru 21'	Report	Yates (yellow card) 52', (goal) 73', 85' (pen.); Mitchell (yellow card) 57'; Dale 69'; Grimshaw (yellow card) 90+2'	Stadium: Madejski Stadium; Attendance: 10,587; Referee: Jeremy Simpson

23 October 2021 14	Blackpool	2–0	Preston North End	Blackpool
15:00 BST	Anderson 27', (yellow card) 90+7'; Madine 68'; Grimshaw (yellow card) 88'; Carey (yellow card) 90+4'; Husband (yellow card) 90+8'	Report	Sinclair (yellow card) 31'; Bauer (yellow card) 39'; Browne (yellow card) 45+3' (yellow-red card) 90+7'; Potts (yellow card) 84'; Maguire (yellow card) 90+8'	Stadium: Bloomfield Road; Attendance: 13,946; Referee: Tim Robinson

30 October 2021 15	Sheffield United	0–1	Blackpool	Sheffield
15:00 BST	Davies (yellow card) 79'; Norwood (yellow card) 89'	Report	Bowler (yellow card) 62'; Anderson 76'	Stadium: Bramall Lane; Attendance: 28,304 (1,922 away); Referee: Tony Harrington

3 November 2021 16	Blackpool	0–1	Stoke City	Blackpool
19:45 GMT		Report	Fletcher 79'	Stadium: Bloomfield Road; Attendance: 12,297; Referee: John Busby

6 November 2021 17	Blackpool	1–1	Queens Park Rangers	Blackpool
17:30 GMT	Madine (yellow card) 36', (goal) 54' (pen.); Anderson (yellow card) 60'	Report	Willock 26'; Odubajo (yellow card) 33'; Adomah (yellow card) 50'; Dieng (yellow card) 53'; Ball (yellow card) 82'; Dunne (yellow card) 90+5'	Stadium: Bloomfield Road; Attendance: 11,769; Referee: Josh Smith

20 November 2021 18	Swansea City	1–1	Blackpool	Swansea
15:00 GMT	Piroe 35'; Bidwell (yellow card) 80'	Report	Sterling (yellow card) 54'; Anderson 86'	Stadium: Swansea.com Stadium; Attendance: 16,886; Referee: Keith Stroud

23 November 2021 19	Blackpool	0–0	West Bromwich Albion	Blackpool
19:45 GMT	Wintle (yellow card) 51'; Anderson (yellow card) 57'	Report	Kipré (yellow card) 45'; Grant (yellow card) 88'	Stadium: Bloomfield Road; Attendance: 11,517; Referee: Jarred Gillett

27 November 2021 20	Birmingham City	1–0	Blackpool	Birmingham
15:00 GMT	Jutkiewicz 81'	Report		Stadium: St Andrew's; Attendance: 17,686 (1,684 away); Referee: Matt Donohue

4 December 2021 21	Blackpool	0–3	Luton Town	Blackpool
15:00 GMT		Report	Bradley 42'; Adebayo 54'; Clark 90+1'	Stadium: Bloomfield Road; Attendance: 11,366; Referee: Peter Bankes

11 December 2021 22	Derby County	1–0	Blackpool	Derby
15:00 GMT	Plange 51'; Jóźwiak (yellow card) 54'; Lawrence (yellow card) 76'	Report	Carey (yellow card) 42'; Anderson (yellow card) 54'	Stadium: Pride Park; Attendance: 21,663; Referee: Andy Woolmer

18 December 2021 23	Blackpool	3–1	Peterborough United	Blackpool
15:00 GMT	Anderson 27'; Carey 86'; Yates 90'	Report	Dembele 11'	Stadium: Bloomfield Road; Attendance: 9,745; Referee: David Webb

27 December 2021 24	Huddersfield Town	3–2	Blackpool	Huddersfield
15:00 GMT	Ward 3'; Toffolo (yellow card) 33'; Holmes (yellow card) 79'; Thomas 80', 84'	Report	Yates 1'; Madine 18'; Lawrence-Gabriel (yellow card) 45+9' (yellow-red card) 61'	Stadium: John Smith's Stadium; Attendance: 18,968; Referee: Jeremy Simpson

29 December 2021 25	Blackpool	1–2	Middlesbrough	Blackpool
19:45 GMT	Connolly (yellow card) 31'; Husband (yellow card) 44'; Lavery 90+1'	Report	Fry (yellow card) 40'; Šporar 60', (yellow card) 61'; Crooks (yellow card) 71'; Peltier (yellow card) 89'; Watmore 90+3'	Stadium: Bloomfield Road; Attendance: 13,428; Referee: Steve Martin

1 January 2022 26	Blackpool	1–0	Hull City	Blackpool
15:00 GMT	Madine 31' (pen.)	Report	Bernard (yellow card) 67'; Honeyman (yellow card) 76'	Stadium: Bloomfield Road; Attendance: 11,300; Referee: Dean Whitestone

22 January 2022 27	Blackpool	1–0	Millwall	Blackpool
15:00 GMT	Garbutt (yellow card); Lavery 55'	Report		Stadium: Bloomfield Road; Attendance: 10,696; Referee: David Webb

29 January 2022 28	Fulham	1–1	Blackpool	Fulham
15:00 GMT	Mitrović 6', (yellow card) 45+1'; Odoi (yellow card) 26'; Carvalho (yellow card) 68'; Wilson (yellow card) 75'	Report	Dougall (yellow card) 39'; Bowler 57'; Gabriel (yellow card) 90+1'	Stadium: Craven Cottage; Attendance: 19,092; Referee: Peter Bankes

5 February 2022 29	Blackpool	3–1	Bristol City	Blackpool
15:00 GMT	Hamilton 36'; Madine 39', (yellow card) 80'; Bowler (yellow card) 44', (goal) 48'; Yates (yellow card) 81'; Connolly (yellow card) 84'	Report	Williams (yellow card) 80'; Semenyo (yellow card) 81'; Scott (yellow card) 84'; Wells 86', (yellow card) 89'	Stadium: Bloomfield Road; Attendance: 11,026; Referee: James Linington

8 February 2022 30	Coventry City	1–1	Blackpool	Coventry
19:45 GMT	Sheaf (yellow card) 14'; Hyam (yellow card) 36'; Gyökeres 42'; Clarke-Salter (yellow card) 71'; Hamer (yellow card) 79'	Report	Madine 24'; James (yellow card) 46'	Stadium: Coventry Building Society Arena; Attendance: 15,752; Referee: Andre Marriner

12 February 2022 31	Blackpool	1–2	Bournemouth	Blackpool
15:00 GMT	Bowler 37'; Sterling (yellow card) 89'; Connolly (yellow card) 90+5'	Report	Solanke (penalty missed) 27'; Marcondes (yellow card) 85'; Lowe 86'; Dembélé 90+5'	Stadium: Bloomfield Road; Attendance: 11,141; Referee: Dean Whitestone

19 February 2022 32	Cardiff City	1–1	Blackpool	Cardiff
15:00 GMT	Bagan 49'; Flint (yellow card) 61'; Vaulks (yellow card) 82'; Ng (yellow card) 85'	BBC Report; Sky report	Ekpiteta 11'; Bowler (yellow card) 66'	Stadium: Cardiff City Stadium; Attendance: 19,025; Referee: Darren Bond (Lancashire)

23 February 2022 33	Queens Park Rangers	2–1	Blackpool	Shepherd's Bush
19:45 GMT	Dunne 31'; Sanderson (red card) 40'; Dieng (yellow card) 58'; Ball (yellow card) 70'; Amos 89' (o.g.); Field (yellow card) 90+3'	Report	James (yellow card) 40'; Bowler 82', (yellow card) 90+2'	Stadium: Kiyan Prince Foundation Stadium; Attendance: 17,387; Referee: Gavin Ward

26 February 2022 34	Blackpool	4–1	Reading	Blackpool
15:00 GMT (UTC)	Ekpiteta 27'; Madine 61'; Yates (yellow card) 77'; Lavery 86'; Bowler 90'	Report	João 17'	Stadium: Bloomfield Road; Attendance: 10,954; Referee: Peter Bankes

5 March 2022 35	Stoke City	0–1	Blackpool	Stoke-on-Trent
15:00 GMT (UTC)	Baker (yellow card) 52'; Vrancic (yellow card) 59'; Harwood-Bellis (yellow card) 70'	Report	James (yellow card) 33'; Bowler 86'; Madine (yellow card) 90+6'; Connolly (yellow card) 90+8'	Stadium: Bet365 Stadium; Attendance: 26,384; Referee: Tony Harrington

12 March 2022 36	Blackpool	1–0	Swansea City	Blackpool
15:00 GMT (UTC)	Madine 4'	Report	Downes (yellow card) 37'; Naughton (yellow card) 90+3'	Stadium: Bloomfield Road; Attendance: 12,344; Referee: Steve Martin

16 March 2022 37	Blackpool	0–0	Sheffield United	Blackpool
19:45 GMT (UTC)	Connolly (yellow card) 41'	Report	Robinson (yellow card) 31'; Sharp (yellow card) 90'	Stadium: Bloomfield Road; Attendance: 11,915; Referee: Geoff Eltringham

2 April 2022 38	Blackpool	1–4	Nottingham Forest	Blackpool
12:30 GMT (UTC)	Stewart (yellow card) 55'; Connolly 89'	Report	Zinckernagel 11'; Johnson 30', 36'; Surridge 82'; Lolley (yellow card) 88'	Stadium: Bloomfield Road; Attendance: 13,986; Referee: Jarred Gillett

5 April 2022 39	Preston North End	1–0	Blackpool	Preston
19:45 BST	Archer 45+3'; Whiteman (yellow card) 45+11'; Johnson (yellow card) 62'; Hughes (yellow card) 64'; McCann (yellow card) 90+2'	Report		Stadium: Deepdale; Referee: David Webb

9 April 2022 40	Blackburn Rovers	1–1	Blackpool	Blackburn
15:00 BST		Report		Stadium: Ewood Park; Attendance: 17,806 (3,678 away); Referee: Matt Donohue

15 April 2022 41	West Bromwich Albion	2–1	Blackpool	West Bromwich
15:00 BST	Carroll 42'; Grant 90+3'	Report	Ekpiteta 53'; Husband (yellow card) 71'	Stadium: The Hawthorns; Attendance: 21,717; Referee: Jeremy Simpson

18 April 2022 42	Blackpool	6–1	Birmingham City	Blackpool
15:00 BST	Beesley 3', 56'; Hamilton 14'; Dougall 40'; Yates 85' (pen.); Connolly 90+4'	Report	Šunjić 63'; Pedersen (yellow card) 75'	Stadium: Bloomfield Road; Attendance: 13,993; Referee: Tim Robinson

23 April 2022 43	Luton Town	1–1	Blackpool	Luton
12:30 BST	Adebayo 2'	Report	Dougall (yellow card) 19'; Madine 55' (pen.), (yellow card) 90+1'; Hamilton (yellow card) 68'; Lavery (yellow card) 90+6'	Stadium: Kenilworth Road; Referee: John Brooks

26 April 2022 44	Barnsley	0–2	Blackpool	Barnsley
19:45 BST	Andersen (yellow card) 9'	Report	Dale 39'; Virtue (yellow card) 62'; Casey 66'	Stadium: Oakwell Stadium; Attendance: 12,256; Referee: John Busby

30 April 2022 45	Blackpool	0–2	Derby County	Blackpool
15:00 BST	Connolly (yellow card) 81'	Report	Ebiowei 73'; Cashin 82'; Davies (yellow card) 84'; Ebosele (yellow card) 88'	Stadium: Bloomfield Road; Attendance: 15,298; Referee: Andy Davies

7 May 2022 46	Peterborough United	5–0	Blackpool	Peterborough
12:30 BST		Report		Stadium: London Road Stadium; Attendance: 9,118 (1,105 away); Referee: Andy Woolmer

==== FA Cup ====
Blackpool were drawn away to Hartlepool United in the third round.

8 January 2022 Third round	Hartlepool United	2–1	Blackpool	Hartlepool
15:00 GMT	Ferguson 48'; Grey 61'	Report	Anderson 8'	Stadium: Victoria Park; Attendance: 4,932; Referee: Matt Donohue

==== EFL Cup ====
Blackpool were drawn at home against Middlesbrough in the first round and Sunderland in the second round.

11 August 2021 First round	Blackpool	3–0	Middlesbrough	Blackpool
19:45 BST	Ekpiteta (yellow card) 19'; Connolly 31'; Casey (yellow card) 33'; Lavery 77'; Anderson 78'	Report	Morsy (yellow card) 31'; Payero (yellow card) 36'	Stadium: Bloomfield Road; Attendance: 5,836; Referee: Bobby Madley

24 August 2021 Second round	Blackpool	2–3	Sunderland	Blackpool
19:45 BST	Lavery 9'; Bowler 87'	Report	O'Brien 12', 57', 91'	Stadium: Bloomfield Road; Attendance: 5,756; Referee: Peter Wright

==== Lancashire Senior Cup ====
Blackpool were drawn against Fleetwood Town in the first round.

21 September 2021 First round	Blackpool	3–0	Fleetwood Town	Blackpool
14:00 BST	Sarkic 3'; Carey 45', 60'	Report		Stadium: Bloomfield Road; Attendance: 0 (Behind-closed-doors); Referee: Richard Aspinall

== Squad statistics ==
No.	Pos.	Name	League		FA Cup		League Cup		Total		Discipline	
No.	Pos.	Name	Apps	Goals	Apps	Goals	Apps	Goals	Apps	Goals	Yellow card	Red card
10	FW	(England) Keshi Anderson	22	4	0	0	2	1	24	5	6	0
25	MF	(England) Cameron Antwi	0	0	0	0	1	0	1	0	0	0
36	MF	(Scotland) Robert Apter	0	0	0	0	0	0	0	0	0	0
—	FW	(England) Ewan Bange	0	0	0	0	0	0	0	0	0	0
11	MF	(England) Josh Bowler	23	1	0	0	2	1	25	2	2	0
16	MF	(England) Sonny Carey	9	1	0	0	2	0	11	1	2	0
20	DF	(England) Oliver Casey	0	0	0	0	2	0	2	0	1	0
2	DF	(England) Callum Connolly	10	0	0	0	1	1	11	1	2	1
7	MF	(England) Owen Dale (on loan from Crewe Alexandra; made permanent in January)	7	1	0	0	0	0	7	1	0	0
12	MF	(Australia) Kenny Dougall	20	0	0	0	1	0	21	0	1	0
21	DF	(England) Marvin Ekpiteta	20	1	0	0	1	0	21	1	3	0
29	DF	(England) Luke Garbutt	14	0	0	0	1	0	15	0	3	0
23	DF	(Iceland) Daníel Leó Grétarsson	0	0	0	0	1	0	1	0	0	0
32	GK	(England) Daniel Grimshaw	10	0	0	0	2	0	12	0	2	0
22	MF	(England) CJ Hamilton	5	0	0	0	2	0	7	0	0	0
—	DF	(England) Cameron Hill	0	0	0	0	0	0	0	0	0	0
38	FW	(England) Brad Holmes	0	0	0	0	0	0	0	0	0	0
—	DF	(England) Teddy Howe	0	0	0	0	0	0	0	0	0	0
3	DF	(England) James Husband	18	1	0	0	1	0	19	1	3	0
5	DF	(England) Reece James	11	0	0	0	2	0	13	0	0	0
28	FW	(England) Tyreece John-Jules (on loan from Arsenal)	11	0	0	0	1	0	12	0	1	0
26	DF	(Republic of Ireland) Richard Keogh	15	0	0	0	1	0	16	0	0	0
4	DF	(England) Jordan Lawrence-Gabriel	12	0	0	0	0	0	12	0	2	0
19	FW	(Northern Ireland) Shayne Lavery	17	5	0	0	2	2	19	7	1	0
30	FW	(Democratic Republic of the Congo) Bez Lubala	0	0	0	0	0	0	0	0	0	0
14	FW	(England) Gary Madine	14	2	0	0	0	0	14	2	1	0
37	MF	(Wales) Luke Mariette	0	0	0	0	0	0	0	0	0	0
1	GK	(Wales) Chris Maxwell	13	0	0	0	0	0	13	0	0	0
15	DF	(England) Demetri Mitchell (joined Hibernian on 24 January)	11	0	0	0	0	0	11	0	1	0
39	GK	(England) Charlie Monks	0	0	0	0	0	0	0	0	0	0
13	GK	(England) Stuart Moore	1	0	0	0	0	0	1	0	0	0
24	FW	(England) Joe Nuttall	0	0	0	0	0	0	0	0	0	0
15	MF	(England) Ethan Robson	0	0	0	0	0	0	0	0	0	0
27	MF	(Montenegro) Oliver Sarkic	0	0	0	0	0	0	0	0	0	0
—	DF	(England) Sky Sinclair	0	0	0	0	0	0	0	0	0	0
35	DF	(England) Dujon Sterling (on loan from Chelsea)	9	0	0	0	0	0	9	0	1	0
6	MF	(Jamaica) Kevin Stewart	3	0	0	0	0	0	3	0	1	0
34	DF	(England) Jordan Thorniley	0	0	0	0	0	0	0	0	0	0
17	MF	(England) Matty Virtue	0	0	0	0	0	0	0	0	0	0
18	MF	(England) Grant Ward	4	0	0	0	1	0	5	0	0	0
8	MF	(England) Ryan Wintle (on loan from Cardiff City)	18	0	0	0	0	0	18	0	3	0
9	FW	(England) Jerry Yates	20	6	0	0	3	0	20	6	2	0
									Discipline totals		38	1

- Players used: 28
- Goals scored: 28 (including 1 own-goal)

Statistics accurate as of 18 December 2021

== Transfers ==
=== Transfers in ===
Date	Pos.	Nat.	Name	From	Fee	Ref.
1 July 2021	RW	(England)	Josh Bowler	Free agency	–	
1 July 2021	CM	(England)	Sonny Carey	King's Lynn Town	Undisclosed	
1 July 2021	CB	(England)	Oliver Casey	Leeds United	Undisclosed	
1 July 2021	CB	(England)	Callum Connolly	Free agency	–	
1 July 2021	GK	(England)	Daniel Grimshaw	Free agency	–	
1 July 2021	LB	(England)	Reece James	Free agency	–	
1 July 2021	CF	(Northern Ireland)	Shayne Lavery	Free agency	–	
17 July 2021	CB	(Republic of Ireland)	Richard Keogh	Free agency	–	
31 August 2021	RB	(England)	Jordan Gabriel	Nottingham Forest	Undisclosed	
10 January 2022	CF	(England)	Jake Beesley	Rochdale	Undisclosed	
13 January 2022	RW	(England)	Owen Dale	Crewe Alexandra	Undisclosed	
31 January 2022	CB	(England)	Douglas Tharme	Southport	Undisclosed	

=== Transfers out ===
Date	Pos.	Nat.	Name	To	Fee	Ref.
4 June 2021	CM	(England)	Ben Garrity	Port Vale	Undisclosed	
30 June 2021	RW	(England)	Liam Feeney	Free agency	–	
30 June 2021	GK	(Slovakia)	Alex Fojticek	Free agency	–	
30 June 2021	LW	(Sierra Leone)	Sullay Kaikai	Free agency	–	
30 June 2021	GK	(England)	Jack Sims	Free agency	–	
30 June 2021	RB	(England)	Ollie Turton	Free agency	–	
30 June 2021	CF	(Tanzania)	Adi Yussuf	Free agency	–	
30 June 2021	DF	(England)	Nathan Shaw	Free agency	–	
4 August 2021	CB	(England)	Aaron Turner	Colne	–	
9 September 2021	CB	(England)	Charlie Penman	Brighton & Hove Albion	Undisclosed	
18 January 2022	RB	(England)	Teddy Howe	Free agency	–	
24 January 2022	LW	(England)	Demetri Mitchell	Hibernian	Undisclosed	
26 January 2022	CF	(England)	Oliver Sarkic	Free agency	–	
27 January 2022	CB	(Iceland)	Daníel Grétarsson	Śląsk Wrocław	Undisclosed	
31 January 2022	CF	(England)	Joe Nuttall	Scunthorpe United	Undisclosed	

=== Loans in ===
Date	Pos.	Nat.	Name	From	Until	Ref.
29 July 2021	CF	(England)	Tyreece John-Jules	Arsenal	End of season	
28 August 2021	CM	(England)	Ryan Wintle	Cardiff City	End of season (recalled on 3 January 2022)	
31 August 2021	RB	(England)	Dujon Sterling	Chelsea	End of season	
1 September 2021	RW	(England)	Owen Dale	Crewe Alexandra	11 January 2022	
27 January 2022	LW	(England)	Charlie Kirk	Charlton Athletic	End of season	

=== Loans out ===
Date	Pos.	Nat.	Name	To	Until	Ref.
1 July 2021	CM	(England)	Ethan Robson	Milton Keynes Dons	End of season; recalled on 17 January 2022	
1 August 2021	CB	(England)	Jordan Thorniley	Oxford United	24 January 2022 (Note: On 24 January, Thorniley was recalled from his loan spell at Oxford.)	
13 August 2021	CF	(England)	Ewan Bange	Bamber Bridge	October 2021	
13 August 2021	CM	(Scotland)	Rob Apter	Bamber Bridge	15 December 2021	
26 August 2021	DF	(England)	Cameron Hill	Sheffield		
14 September 2021	AM	(England)	Brad Holmes	FC United of Manchester	22 December 2021	
8 October 2021	MF	(England)	Cameron Antwi	AFC Telford United	29 December 2021	(Note: Antwi's loan at Telford was extended to January 2022) (Note: Cameron was recalled from his loan at AFC Telford United on 29 December 2021.)
9 November 2021	CF	(England)	Ewan Bange	AFC Telford United	13 January 2022	
22 December 2021	AM	(England)	Brad Holmes	Chorley		
23 December 2021	MF	(England)	Sky Sinclair	Lancaster City	20 January 2022	
3 January 2022	CM	(Scotland)	Rob Apter	Chester	31 January 2022 initially; extended to the end of the season	
7 January 2022	MF	(England)	Matthew Liptrott	Stalybridge Celtic		
7 January 2022	DF	(England)	Jack Moore	Radcliffe		
11 January 2022	MF	(England)	Tayt Trusty	Radcliffe	8 February 2022	
21 January 2022	CF	(England)	Ewan Bange	FC United of Manchester	End of season	
31 January 2022	CF	(Democratic Republic of the Congo)	Bez Lubala	Northampton Town	End of season	
31 January 2022	MF	(England)	Sky Sinclair	Nantwich Town	March 2022	
31 January 2022	CB	(England)	Douglas Tharme	Southport	End of season	
11 March 2022	CM	(Wales)	Luke Mariette	Curzon Ashton		
11 March 2022	MF	(England)	Tayt Trusty	Hyde United		
24 March 2022	MF	(England)	Jake Daniels	Bamber Bridge	End of season	
24 March 2022	MF	(England)	Matthew Liptrott	Radcliffe	End of season	
24 March 2022	MF	(England)	Joe Strawn	Bamber Bridge	End of season	
