= 2023–24 Blackpool F.C. season =

English football club season

Blackpool
2023–24 season
- Owner: Simon Sadler
- Head coach: Neil Critchley
- Stadium: Bloomfield Road
- League One: 8th
- FA Cup: Third round
- EFL Cup: Second round
- EFL Trophy: Semi final
- Top goalscorer: League: Jordan Rhodes (15); All: Jordan Rhodes (15)
Home colours

The 2023–24 season was the 115th season in the history of Blackpool F.C., and their first season back in League One, the third tier of English professional football, since the 2020–21 season, following their relegation from the EFL Championship at the end of the 2022–23 season. They finished in eighth position in the league table, with 73 points from their 46 games. The club also participated in three cup competitions: they were knocked out of the FA Cup in the third round, knocked out of the EFL Cup in the second round and knocked out of the EFL Trophy in the semi-finals.

Jordan Rhodes, on loan from Huddersfield Town, was the club's top scorer, with fifteen goals in all competitions.

It was Neil Critchley's first season as manager, in his second spell at the club. It was also the club's 100th season in tangerine.

== Pre-season ==
Blackpool made two signings which became official on 1 July: midfielder Albie Morgan and defender Matthew Pennington both arrived on free transfers, upon the expiration of their contracts with their previous clubs.

On 7 July, Blackpool travelled down the coast to Southport for their opening friendly. Goals from Kenny Dougall, Brad Holmes and Matty Virtue gave the visitors victory.

Blackpool hosted newly promoted Championship side Plymouth Argyle on 15 July. Plymouth won 2–1. Blackpool's goal came from Shayne Lavery's penalty.

Four days later, the Seasiders faced a Wolverhampton Wanderers XI at Compton Park Training Ground in a behind-closed-doors fixture. Blackpool won 4–2, with goals from Shayne Lavery (two) and Albie Morgan, as well as an own-goal.

Barrow was the destination on 22 July. Blackpool won 5–0, with goals from Matty Virtue, Shayne Lavery, Jake Beesley and Sonny Carey (two).

=== Results ===
On 2 June, Blackpool confirmed their first three pre-season friendlies, against Southport, Barrow and Morecambe. A fourth fixture was later added, versus Hibernian.

Win Draw Loss Fixtures

7 July 2023 Friendly	Southport	0–3	Blackpool	Blowick
19:45 BST		Report	Dougall; Holmes; Virtue	Stadium: Haig Avenue

15 July 2023 Friendly	Blackpool	1–2	Plymouth Argyle	Blackpool
15:00 BST	Lavery (pen.)	Report	Miller; Hardie	Stadium: Bloomfield Road; Attendance: 0 (behind-closed-doors)

19 July 2023 Friendly	Wolverhampton Wanderers XI	2–4	Blackpool	Wolverhampton
12:00 BST		Report	67' (o.g.); Lavery 90', 115'; Morgan	Stadium: Compton Park Training Ground; Attendance: 0 (behind-closed-doors)
Note: 2 matches both an hour long

22 July 2023 Friendly	Barrow	0–5	Blackpool	Barrow-in-Furness
15:00 BST		Report	Virtue 15'; Lavery 17'; Beesley 54'; Carey 77', 90+4'	Stadium: Holker Street

25 July 2023 Friendly	Blackpool	1–2	Tranmere Rovers	Blackpool
14:00 BST	Dale 26'	Report	Jennings (pen.); Walker	Stadium: Bloomfield Road; Attendance: 0 (behind closed doors)

25 July 2023 Friendly	Morecambe	1–1	Blackpool	Morecambe
19:30 BST	Bloxham 44'	Report	Lavery 56'	Stadium: Mazuma Stadium

29 July 2023 Friendly	Blackpool	3–0	Hibernian	Blackpool
15:00 BST	Lavery 60'; Dougall 84'; Dale 87'	Report		Stadium: Bloomfield Road

== Season proper ==
=== August ===
Blackpool opened their league campaign on 5 August with a 2–0 victory over Burton Albion at Bloomfield Road, in what was Neil Critchley's first competitive fixture back in charge of the team. A double from Shayne Lavery midway through the first half proved to be the difference.

Three days later, they booked their place in the second round of the EFL Cup after a 2–0 win at Derby County. Jake Beesley scored both Blackpool goals. They will face Wolverhampton Wanderers at Molineux Stadium in the week commencing 28 August.

The club brought in midfielder Jensen Weir from Brighton & Hove Albion on a season-long loan on 11 August.

A long trip to Exeter City on 12 August resulted in a point after a goalless draw. Blackpool dropped four places to eighth with the point.

Port Vale were the visitors to Bloomfield Road on 15 August in a match that finished goalless. Blackpool remained eighth.

The following day, midfielder Tashan Oakley-Boothe joined on a free transfer.

A third-successive scoreless match occurred on 19 August, when Blackpool hosted Leyton Orient. The Tangerines, still undefeated, dropped three places to eleventh.

On 25 August, striker Jordan Rhodes joined the club, on loan from Huddersfield Town, for the remainder of the season.

The club's first defeat occurred on 26 August, at Lincoln City, with a 3–0 scoreline for the hosts. Oliver Norburn was sent off for the visitors in the second half. Blackpool dropped four places to fifteenth.

Blackpool were knocked out of the EFL Cup at the second-round stage by Wolverhampton Wanderers on 29 August, after a 5–0 scoreline at Molineux. It was their fifth-consecutive game without a goal, a total of 450 minutes.

On 30 August, winger Karamoko Dembélé joined on a season-long loan from Brest. Tom Trybull was released by mutual consent the following day.

=== September ===
On 2 September, Blackpool beat Wigan Athletic 2–1, with goals from Jordan Rhodes (on his home debut) and Kenny Dougall (a 94th-minute winner). Blackpool climbed three places to twelfth with the victory.

Three days later, Blackpool travelled up the coast to face Barrow in the EFL Trophy. Goals from Sonny Carey and new arrival Kylian Kouassi gave Blackpool the three points.

After an eleven-day international break, Blackpool visited Wycombe Wanderers. They were beaten 2–0, and dropped two places to fourteenth in the table.

On 23 September, Blackpool beat Reading 4–1 at Bloomfield Road. Jordan Rhodes scored a hat-trick (the first Blackpool player to do so since Nathan Delfouneso in 2018); the other goal came from Kylian Kouassi on his starting debut. Blackpool remained fourteenth.

A second-successive victory followed on 30 September with a 1–0 scoreline at Barnsley. Jordan Rhodes scored from the penalty spot, his fifth goal in three games. Blackpool climbed three places to eleventh.

=== October ===
Derby County beat Blackpool 3–1 at Bloomfield Road on 3 October, inflicting the Seasiders' first home defeat of the campaign. The hosts dropped two places to thirteenth.

On 7 October, Blackpool travelled to London to face Charlton Athletic. The visitors let slip a two-goal lead and had to settle for a draw. Jordan Rhodes (with his sixth goal of the campaign) and Kylian Kouassi, with his first for the club, were Blackpool's goal scorers. They climbed three places to tenth with the point.

Blackpool made it two wins out of two in the EFL Trophy on 10 October, with a 5–2 scoreline against Liverpool F.C. Academy. Kylian Kouassi scored a hat-trick; the other two goals came from Albie Morgan and Andy Lyons, on his return to the team following a family bereavement.

Blackpool beat Stevenage Borough 3–0 at Bloomfield Road on 14 October, the goals coming from Jordan Rhodes, Owen Dale and CJ Hamilton. Blackpool climbed three places to seventh, although several teams around them had their matches postponed due to international call-ups.

A trip to Oxford United a week later resulted in a 1–1 draw, with Blackpool equalising in stoppage time through Jordan Rhodes. They remained seventh.

Blackpool climbed into the play-off places with a 3–2 victory at home to Cheltenham Town on 24 August. The hosts' goals came from Shayne Lavery, Jordan Rhodes (his ninth goal in ten appearances) and Karamoko Dembélé (his first goal for the club).

October ended with a 4–2 defeat to Peterborough United at Bloomfield Road. Oliver Casey was dismissed early in the second half. Blackpool went 3–0 down from the subsequent free-kick but fought back to 3–2, with goals from Kenny Dougall and Sonny Carey, but conceded again in stoppage time. Blackpool dropped one place to seventh.

=== November ===
The fourth month of the campaign began with a 3–3 draw at nearby Fleetwood Town. The home side went 2–0 up in the first half, but Blackpool came back to lead 3–2 (through two goals from Sonny Carey and one from Shayne Lavery) in the second half. Fleetwood equalised into ten minutes of stoppage time. Blackpool dropped one place to eighth with the point.

Blackpool reached the second round of the FA Cup with a 2–0 victory at Bromley on 4 November. The goals came from Shayne Lavery and Kylian Kouassi.

On 11 November, Blackpool lost 1–0 at Bolton Wanderers, managed by former Seasiders captain Ian Evatt. Blackpool remained eighth but had now played a game more than the teams around them.

Three days later, Blackpool beat Morecambe 2–1 in the EFL Trophy, maintaining their place atop Northern Group A and sealing their progression to the second round.

On 18 November, Blackpool beat Shrewsbury Town 4–0 at Bloomfield Road, with goals from Jordan Rhodes, Jake Beesley (2) and Kyle Joseph (his first for the club).

Blackpool travelled to top-of-the-table Portsmouth on 25 November, and returned with all three points in a 4–0 victory, bringing to an end Posh's 27-game unbeaten run. The hosts were reduced to ten men just after the hour mark, by which point Blackpool were 2–0 up, after goals from Owen Dale and Jake Beesley. CJ Hamilton scored with fifteen minutes remaining, and Albie Morgan made it 4–0 on 87 minutes. Blackpool climbed one place to seventh with the victory, although the team above and below them each have a game in hand.

A defeat, 2–1 at home to Northampton Town, followed three days later. Jordan Rhodes scored the home side's goal, his eleventh for the club, who dropped one place to eighth.

=== December ===
On 5 December, Blackpool beat Barnsley 2–1 in the second round of the EFL Trophy. Owen Dale and Jake Beesley got the hosts' goals.

Four days later, Blackpool made it three wins out of four in the league as they beat Carlisle United 3–0 at Bloomfield Road. Andy Lyons and a double from Jordan Rhodes (bringing his tally for the season to 13) were the scorers. Blackpool remained eighth.

Blackpool fell to defeat at Cambridge United on 16 December, followed by a 3–1 victory at home to Bristol Rovers on 23 December.

A single-goal defeat occurred at Burton Albion on Boxing Day.

A trip to Vale Park on 29 December resulted in a 3–0 defeat for Neil Critchley's side. Blackpool had remained in eighth position in the League One table throughout December, although the teams either side of them each had two games in hand.

=== January ===
Blackpool got 2024 underway with a 2–0 New Year's Day victory over Lincoln City at Bloomfield Road. Jordan Rhodes and CJ Hamilton scored the goals. On the transfer front, Jensen Weir was recalled by Brighton.

On 7 January, Blackpool travelled to Premier League strugglers Nottingham Forest in the third round of the FA Cup. The visitors went 2–0 up, through goals by Jordan Gabriel and Albie Morgan, but Forest fought back, with the tie finishing 2–2. A replay will be held at Bloomfield Road in the coming weeks. The following day, left-sided player Hayden Coulson, 25, joined Blackpool on loan from Middlesbrough.

Blackpool reached the quarter-finals of the EFL Trophy on 10 January, following a 2–1 victory over Burton Albion at Bloomfield Road. Matty Virtue and Marvin Ekpiteta got the hosts' goals.

On 12 January, left-back Dominic Thompson was loaned out to Forest Green Rovers until the end of the season, while central defender Doug Tharme made a permanent move to Grimsby Town.

For the third time this season, Blackpool achieved back-to-back wins in the league, with a 2–0 scoreline over Exeter City at Bloomfield Road. Albie Morgan scored both of the Tangerines' goals.

Blackpool were knocked out of the FA Cup on 17 January in the third-round replay against Nottingham Forest at Bloomfield Road. Forest went 2–0 up, but Blackpool fought back to level proceedings, and took the tie to extra time, during which the visitors scored a decisive third goal.

A third-consecutive league victory occurred on 20 January, a 2–1 scoreline at Bristol Rovers. CJ Hamilton and Karamoko Dembele got the goals for visitors, who remained in eighth position.

On 24 January, midfielder Kenny Dougall left the club for Buriram United for an undisclosed fee.

A 1–1 draw at home to Charlton Athletic on 27 January kept Blackpool in eighth place.

Three days later, Blackpool beat Bolton Wanderers, on penalties after a goalless draw, to reach the semi-final of the EFL Trophy.

On 31 January, midfielder Ryan Finnigan joined on a permanent transfer from Southampton, for an undisclosed fee. Tashan Oakley-Boothe, meanwhile, had his contract terminated by mutual consent.

=== February ===
1 February was transfer-deadline day, and Blackpool brought in two players (one permanent and one loan), and offloaded one. Centre-back Dan Sassi joined from Lancashire neighbours Burnley for an undisclosed fee, while midfielder George Byers signed on loan for from Sheffield Wednesday for the remainder of the season. Winger Owen Dale moved to Oxford United for an undisclosed fee.

On 3 February, Blackpool lost 1–0 at Stevenage, their seventh loss in fourteen away fixtures. Blackpool remained eighth, five places behind Oxford United.

Blackpool drew 1–1 with Oxford United on 10 February.

Three days later, a defeat at Cheltenham Town, Blackpool's eighth away loss in the league, dropped them to ninth in the table.

A trip to Peterborough United on 17 February resulted in a 2–1 victory. Having gone a goal down, Blackpool replied with goals by Shayne Lavery (penalty) and a stoppage-time winner by Karamoko Dembélé. Blackpool returned to eighth position.

Blackpool were knocked out of the EFL Trophy, at the semi-final stage, on 20 February. Peterborough United were 3–0 victors in the tie at Bloomfield Road.

On 24 February, Blackpool beat Bolton Wanderers 4–1 at Bloomfield Road, with goals from Jake Beesley (2), Marvin Ekpiteta and Jordan Gabriel. They climbed one spot to eighth.

A trip to Leyton Orient three days later resulted in a single-goal defeat.

=== March ===
March began with a 2–0 victory at Shrewsbury Town. Karamoko Dembélé and a Hayden Coulson (his first for the club) got the goals. Blackpool remained eighth, but closed the gap to Oxford United to one point.

A goalless draw at home to top-of-the-table Portsmouth followed on 9 March. The hosts had Jordan Rhodes sent off two minutes before half time, the first dismissal of his career, but it was overturned two days later upon review.

On 12 March, Blackpool recorded a second-successive away victory, this time at Northampton Town. Matthew Pennington got the goal. The three points moved Blackpool up one place to seventh in the table, one point outside the play-off places.

A defeat ensued on 16 March, Blackpool's first loss in four matches. They dropped two places to ninth, three points outside the play-off places.

After an international break, Blackpool lost for a second-successive match, at Derby County by a single goal. They remained ninth, but were now four points outside the play-off berths.

=== April ===
A goalless draw at home to Wycombe Wanderers began the penultimate month of the campaign. This was followed by three-consecutive single-goal victories: at home to Cambridge United and Fleetwood Town, and away to Carlisle United. With those ten points, Blackpool climbed to seventh place, three points behind Oxford United in the final play-off spot, with two games remaining (three for Oxford United).

A fourth-consecutive victory followed, at home to Barnsley, on 20 April. With one game remaining, Blackpool were one point behind Lincoln City in the final play-off spot. Barnsley were also within reach.

Blackpool finished the season with a 3–2 defeat at Reading on 27 April. They finished the campaign in eighth place, three points outside the play-off positions.

=== May ===
On 7 May, the club announced its retained list for the 2024–25 season. Contract extensions were exercised on six players:

- Harvey Bardsley
- Mackenzie Chapman
- Sonny Carey
- Jake Daniels
- Jack Moore
- Richard O'Donnell

Ten players were released:

- Callum Connolly
- Marvin Ekpiteta
- Dannen Francis
- Brad Holmes
- Shayne Lavery
- Donovan Lescott
- Luke Mariette
- Will Squires
- Tayt Trusty
- Matty Virtue

The club was in discussions with James Husband, while Tyler Hill was offered a professional contract. Goalkeeper Matteo Spinelli was one of four scholars who left the club.

=== June ===
Jordan Rhodes was the first incoming transfer of Blackpool's close season. After this season's loan, he will make the move permanent on 1 July, after agreeing on 3 June to sign a twelve-month contract with an option for a further year. He arrived on a free transfer.

== Competitions ==
=== League One ===
==== League table ====
Pos	Team	Pld	W	D	L	GF	GA	GD	Pts	Promotion, qualification or relegation
5	Oxford United (O, P)	46	22	11	13	79	56	+23	77	Qualification for League One play-offs
6	Barnsley	46	21	13	12	82	64	+18	76	Qualification for League One play-offs
7	Lincoln City	46	20	14	12	65	40	+25	74	
8	Blackpool	46	21	10	15	65	48	+17	73	
9	Stevenage	46	19	14	13	57	46	+11	71	
10	Wycombe Wanderers	46	17	14	15	60	55	+5	65	
11	Leyton Orient	46	18	11	17	53	55	−2	65	

Source: EFL Official Website
Rules for classification: 1) Points; 2) Goal difference; 3) Number of goals scored; 4) Head-to-head results; 5) Wins; 6) Away goals; 7) Penalty points (sec 9.5); 8) 12-point sending off offences
(O) Play-off winners; (P) Promoted

==== Results summary ====
Overall								Home						Away					
Pld	W	D	L	GF	GA	GD	Pts	W	D	L	GF	GA	GD	W	D	L	GF	GA	GD
46	21	10	15	65	48	+17	73	14	6	3	43	19	+24	7	4	12	22	29	−7

Last updated: 9 April 2024.
Source: Soccerway

==== Results ====
On 22 June, the EFL League One fixtures were released.

Win Draw Loss

5 August 2023 1	Blackpool	2–0	Burton Albion	Blackpool
15:00 BST	Lavery 19', 25'	Report		Stadium: Bloomfield Road; Attendance: 10,943; Referee: Seb Stockbridge

12 August 2023 2	Exeter City	0–0	Blackpool	Exeter
15:00 BST		Report		Stadium: St James Park; Attendance: 7,340 (726 away); Referee: Hugh Gilroy

15 August 2023 3	Blackpool	0–0	Port Vale	Blackpool
19:45 BST		Report		Stadium: Bloomfield Road; Attendance: 11,416; Referee: Ross Joyce

19 August 2023 4	Blackpool	0–0	Leyton Orient	Blackpool
15:00 BST		Report		Stadium: Bloomfield Road; Attendance: 10,146; Referee: Marc Edwards

26 August 2023 5	Lincoln City	3–0	Blackpool	Lincoln
15:00 BST	Mandroiu 7' (pen.); Erhahon 40'; Bishop 73' (pen.)	Report		Stadium: LNER Stadium; Attendance: 8,012 (760 away); Referee: Martin Coy

2 September 2023 6	Blackpool	2–1	Wigan Athletic	Blackpool
15:00 BST	Rhodes 4'; Dougall 90+4'	Report	Magennis 89'	Stadium: Bloomfield Road; Attendance: 11,537; Referee: Anthony Backhouse

16 September 2023 8	Wycombe Wanderers	2–0	Blackpool	High Wycombe
15:00 BST	Vokes 13'; Hanlan 46'	Report		Stadium: Adams Park; Attendance: 4,691 (630 away); Referee: Neil Hair

23 September 2023 9	Blackpool	4–1	Reading	Blackpool
15:00 BST	Rhodes 20' (pen.), 31', 51'; Kouassi 27'	Report	Husband 78' (o.g.)	Stadium: Bloomfield Road; Attendance: 10,104; Referee: Tom Reeves

30 September 2023 10	Barnsley	0–1	Blackpool	Barnsley
15:00 BST			Rhodes 24' (pen.)	Stadium: Oakwell; Attendance: 13,005 (1,430 away); Referee: Charles Breakspear

3 October 2023 11	Blackpool	1–3	Derby County	Blackpool
19:45 BST	Dougall 73'		Smith 54'; Collins 71'; Waghorn 89'	Stadium: Bloomfield Road; Attendance: 11,137; Referee: Will Finnie

7 October 2023 12	Charlton Athletic	2–2	Blackpool	Charlton
15:00 BST	May 81'; Blackett-Taylor 83'	Report	Rhodes 34'; Dembélé 70'	Stadium: The Valley; Attendance: 13,120 (933 away); Referee: Andy Davies

14 October 2023 13	Blackpool	3–0	Stevenage	Blackpool
15:00 BST	Rhodes 38'; Dale 60'; Hamilton 78'	Report		Stadium: Bloomfield Road; Attendance: 10,516; Referee: Paul Howard

21 October 2023 14	Oxford United	1–1	Blackpool	Littlemore
15:00 GMT	Leigh 36'	Report	Rhodes 90+2'	Stadium: The Kassam Stadium; Attendance: 9,417 (781 away); Referee: Thomas Kirk

24 October 2023 15	Blackpool	3–2	Cheltenham Town	Blackpool
19:45 GMT	Lavery 18'; Rhodes 32'; Dembélé 41'	Report	Goodwin 44', 86'	Stadium: Bloomfield Road; Attendance: 9,288; Referee: Adam Herczeg

28 October 2023 16	Blackpool	2–4	Peterborough United	Blackpool
15:00 GMT	Dougall 60'; Carey 64'	Report	Poku 16'; Burrows 47'; Jones 58'; Mason-Clark 90+2'	Stadium: Bloomfield Road; Attendance: 10,684; Referee: Ben Atkinson

1 November 2023 7	Fleetwood Town	3–3	Blackpool	Fleetwood
19:45 GMT	Omochere 13'; Marriott 18', 90'	Report	Carey 48', 51'; Lavery 66'	Stadium: Highbury Stadium; Referee: Darren Drysdale
Note: Fixture was previously postponed due to international call-ups.

11 November 2023 17	Bolton Wanderers	1–0	Blackpool	Horwich
15:00 GMT	Thomason 74'	Report		Stadium: Toughsheet Community Stadium; Attendance: 24,238 (4,171 away); Referee: Ben Toner

18 November 2023 18	Blackpool	4–0	Shrewsbury Town	Blackpool
15:00 GMT	Rhodes 19' (pen.); Beesley 33', 82'; Joseph 74'	Report		Stadium: Bloomfield Road; Attendance: 10,502; Referee: Ben Speedie

25 November 2023 19	Portsmouth	0–4	Blackpool	Portsmouth
15:00 GMT	Morrell (red card) 63'	Report	Dale 9'; Beesley 56'; Hamilton 74'; Morgan 87'	Stadium: Fratton Park; Attendance: 18,697 (618 away); Referee: Ollie Yates

28 November 2023 20	Blackpool	1–2	Northampton Town	Blackpool
19:45 GMT	Rhodes 65'		Bowie 31'; Hoskins 75'	Stadium: Bloomfield Road; Attendance: 9,058; Referee: Geoff Eltringham

9 December 2023 21	Blackpool	3–0	Carlisle United	Blackpool
15:00 GMT	Lyons 22'; Rhodes 67', 90+5'	Report		Stadium: Bloomfield Road; Attendance: 11,848; Referee: Lewis Smith

16 December 2023 22	Cambridge United	2–1	Blackpool	Cambridge
15:00 GMT	Kachunga 32'; Ahadme 44' (pen.)	Report	Rhodes 25'	Stadium: Abbey Stadium; Attendance: 6,042 (674 away); Referee: Charles Breakspear

23 December 2023 23	Blackpool	3–1	Bristol Rovers	Blackpool
15:00 GMT	Norburn 21'; Beesley 46'; Rhodes 82'	Report	Marquis 25'	Stadium: Bloomfield Road; Attendance: 10,076; Referee: Ross Joyce

26 December 2023 24	Burton Albion	1–0	Blackpool	Burton-upon-Trent
15:00 GMT		Report	Kamwa 10'	Stadium: Pirelli Stadium; Attendance: 4,196 (1,000 away); Referee: Scott Simpson

29 December 2023 25	Port Vale	3–0	Blackpool	Stoke-on-Trent
19:45 GMT	Garrity 39'; Wilson 57'; Smith 80'	Report		Stadium: Vale Park; Attendance: 6,203 (1,160 away); Referee: Steve Martin

1 January 2024 26	Blackpool	2–0	Lincoln City	Blackpool
15:00 GMT	Casey 29'; Hamilton 90+2'	Report		Stadium: Bloomfield Road; Attendance: 10,353; Referee: Marc Edwards

13 January 2024 27	Blackpool	2–0	Exeter City	Blackpool
15:00 GMT	Morgan 39', 49'	Report		Stadium: Bloomfield Road; Attendance: 9,374; Referee: Thomas Bramall

20 January 2024 28	Bristol Rovers	1–2	Blackpool	Bristol
15:00 GMT	Martin 24'	Report	Hamilton 5'; Dembélé 19'	Stadium: Memorial Stadium; Attendance: 8,013 (561 away); Referee: Gavin Ward

27 January 2024 29	Blackpool	1–1	Charlton Athletic	Blackpool
15:00 GMT	Dembélé 53'	Report	Ekpiteta 69' (o.g.)	Stadium: Bloomfield Road; Attendance: 10,059; Referee: Darren Drysdale

3 February 2024 30	Stevenage	1–0	Blackpool	Stevenage
15:00 GMT	Forster-Caskey 85'	Report		Stadium: Lamex Stadium; Attendance: 5,014 (780 away); Referee: Simon Mather

10 February 2024 31	Blackpool	1–1	Oxford United	Blackpool
15:00 GMT	Pennington 18'	Report	Harris 21'	Stadium: Bloomfield Road; Attendance: 10,485; Referee: Paul Howard

13 February 2024 32	Cheltenham Town	2–0	Blackpool	Cheltenham
19:45 GMT	Bonds 31', 85'	Report		Stadium: The Completely-Suzuki Stadium; Attendance: 3,865 (434 away); Referee: Matthew Corlett

17 February 2024 33	Peterborough United	1–2	Blackpool	Peterborough
15:00 GMT	Kyprianou 39'	Report	Lavery 56' (pen.); Dembélé 90+1'	Stadium: Weston Homes Stadium; Attendance: 8,293 (451 away); Referee: Dean Whitestone

24 February 2024 34	Blackpool	4–1	Bolton Wanderers	Blackpool
15:00 GMT	Beesley 16', 68' (pen.); Ekpiteta 27'; Lawrence-Gabriel 84'	Report	Thomason 9'	Stadium: Bloomfield Road; Attendance: 12,276; Referee: Josh Smith

27 February 2024 35	Leyton Orient	1–0	Blackpool	Leyton
19:45 GMT	O'Neill 52'	Report		Stadium: Gaughan Group Stadium; Attendance: 7,198 (531 away); Referee: Ben Speedie

2 March 2024 36	Shrewsbury Town	0–2	Blackpool	Shrewsbury
15:00 GMT		Report	Dembélé 43'; Coulson 84'	Stadium: The Croud Meadow; Attendance: 6,602 (835 away); Referee: Declan Bourne

9 March 2024 37	Blackpool	0–0	Portsmouth	Blackpool
15:00 GMT		Report		Stadium: Bloomfield Road; Attendance: 11,811; Referee: Edward Duckworth

12 March 2024 38	Northampton Town	0–1	Blackpool	Northampton
19:45 GMT		Report	Pennington 55'	Stadium: Sixfields Stadium; Attendance: 5,472 (313 away); Referee: James Bell

16 March 2024 39	Wigan Athletic	1–0	Blackpool	Wigan
15:00 GMT	Smith 26'	Report		Stadium: DW Stadium; Attendance: 13,964 (2,931 away); Referee: James Linington

29 March 2024 41	Derby County	1–0	Blackpool	Derby
15:00 GMT	Adams 40'	Report		Stadium: Pride Park; Attendance: 30,089 (1,207 away); Referee: Thomas Kirk

1 April 2024 42	Blackpool	0–0	Wycombe Wanderers	Blackpool
15:00 BST		Report		Stadium: Bloomfield Road; Attendance: 10,171; Referee: Ross Joyce

6 April 2024 43	Blackpool	1–0	Cambridge United	Blackpool
15:00 BST	Carey 30'	Report		Stadium: Bloomfield Road; Attendance: 10,187; Referee: Dean Whitestone

9 April 2024 40	Blackpool	1–0	Fleetwood Town	Blackpool
19:45 BST	Beesley 22'	Report		Stadium: Bloomfield Road; Attendance: 10,845; Referee: Marc Edwards

13 April 2024 44	Carlisle United	0–1	Blackpool	Carlisle
15:00 BST		Report	Dembélé 1'	Stadium: Brunton Park; Attendance: 7,600 (1,548 away); Referee: Tom Reeves

20 April 2024 45	Blackpool	3–2	Barnsley	Blackpool
15:00 BST		Report		Stadium: Bloomfield Road; Attendance: 12,526; Referee: Sunny Gill

27 April 2024 46	Reading	3–2	Blackpool	Reading
13:00 BST		Report		Stadium: Madejski Stadium; Attendance: 18,480 (1,752 away); Referee: Ben Speedie

=== FA Cup ===
The Tangerines were drawn away to Bromley in the first round and at home to Forest Green Rovers in the second round.

Win Draw Loss

4 November 2023 First round	Bromley	0–2	Blackpool	Bromley
15:00 GMT		Report	Lavery 5'; Dembélé 28'	Stadium: Reloc8 Em Community Stadium; Attendance: 4.455; Referee: David Rock

19 December 2023 Second round	Blackpool	3–0	Forest Green Rovers	Blackpool
19:45 GMT	Dale 18'; Lawrence-Gabriel 75'; Ekpiteta 84'	Report		Stadium: Bloomfield Road; Attendance: 3,188; Referee: Scott Jackson

7 January 2024 Third round	Nottingham Forest	2–2	Blackpool	Nottingham
14:00 GMT	Domínguez 39'; Gibbs-White 56'	Report	Lawrence-Gabriel 25'; Morgan 27'	Stadium: City Ground; Attendance: 27,909; Referee: Sunny Sukhvir Gill

17 January 2024 Third round replay	Blackpool	2–3 (a.e.t.)	Nottingham Forest	Blackpool
19:45 GMT	Morgan 61'; Joseph 78'	Report	Omobamidele 16'; Danilo 46'; Wood 110'	Stadium: Bloomfield Road; Attendance: 8,098; Referee: Darren Bond

=== EFL Cup ===
Blackpool were drawn away to Derby County in the first round and to Wolverhampton Wanderers in the second round.

Win Draw Loss

8 August 2023 First round	Derby County	0–2	Blackpool	Derby
19:45 BST		Report	Beesley 7', 32'	Stadium: Pride Park Stadium; Attendance: 7,033; Referee: Jeremy Simpson

29 August 2023 Second round	Wolverhampton Wanderers	5–0	Blackpool	Wolverhampton
19:45 BST	Kalajdžić 10'; Silva 25'; Doherty 60', 66'; Fraser 84'	Report		Stadium: Molineux; Attendance: 20,605; Referee: Jarred Gillett

=== EFL Trophy ===
In the group stage, Blackpool were drawn into Northern Group A alongside Barrow, Morecambe and Liverpool U21. After topping their group, they were drawn at home to Barnsley in the second round and Burton Albion in the third round. They were then drawn at home to Bolton Wanderers in the Quarter-Finals and to Peterborough United in the Semi-Finals.

Pos	Div	Team	Pld	W	PW	PL	L	GF	GA	GD	Pts	Qualification
1	L1	Blackpool	3	3	0	0	0	9	3	+6	9	Advance to Round 2
2	ACA	Liverpool U21	3	1	0	0	2	6	7	−1	3	Advance to Round 2
3	L2	Morecambe	3	1	0	0	2	4	6	−2	3	
4	L2	Barrow	3	1	0	0	2	3	6	−3	3	

Updated to match(es) played on 14 November 2023. Source: EFL.com

Win Draw Loss

5 September 2023 Group stage	Barrow	0–2	Blackpool	Barrow-in-Furness
19:00 BST		Report	Carey 44'; Kouassi 85'	Stadium: SO Legal Stadium; Attendance: 1,436; Referee: Matthew Corlett

10 October 2023 Group stage	Blackpool	5–2	Liverpool U21	Blackpool
19:00 BST	Morgan 45+3'; Kouassi 46', 75', 89'; Lyons 90+6'	Report	Glatzel 30'; Musiałowski 66'	Stadium: Bloomfield Road; Attendance: 2,683; Referee: Scott Simpson

14 November 2023 Group stage	Blackpool	2–1	Morecambe	Blackpool
19:00 GMT	Beesley 21', 46'	Report	Rawson 90+2'	Stadium: Bloomfield Road; Attendance: 1,829; Referee: Martin Woods

5 December 2023 Second round	Blackpool	2–1	Barnsley	Blackpool
19:00 GMT	Dale 50'; Beesley 62'	Report	McAtee 41'	Stadium: Bloomfield Road; Attendance: 1,296; Referee: Daniel Middleton

10 January 2024 Third round	Blackpool	2–1	Burton Albion	Blackpool
19:00 GMT	Virtue 4'; Ekpiteta 67'	Report	Scott 71'	Stadium: Bloomfield Road; Attendance: 1,534; Referee: Peter Wright

30 January 2024 Quarter-Final	Blackpool	0–0 (5–4 p)	Bolton Wanderers	Blackpool
19:00 GMT		Report		Stadium: Bloomfield Road; Attendance: 5,649; Referee: Seb Stockbridge
	Penalties
	Hamilton (penalty scored); Connolly (penalty scored); Norburn (penalty missed); Lawrence-Gabriel (penalty missed); Dembélé (penalty scored); Kouassi (penalty scored); Pennington (penalty scored)		(penalty scored) Morley; (penalty missed) Charles; (penalty missed) Böðvarsson; (penalty scored) Mendes Gomes; (penalty scored) Thomason; (penalty scored) Josh Dacres-Cogley; (penalty missed) Ashworth

20 February 2024 Semi Finals	Blackpool	0–3	Peterborough United	Blackpool
20:00 GMT		Report	Mothersille 37'; Burrows 80' (pen.), 90+3'	Stadium: Bloomfield Road; Attendance: 6,044; Referee: Lewis Smith

== Transfers ==
=== In ===
Date	Pos	Player	From	Fee	Ref
27 June 2023	GK	Richard O'Donnell	Rochdale	Undisclosed	
29 June 2023	CM	Oliver Norburn	Peterborough United	Undisclosed	
1 July 2023	CM	Albie Morgan	Free agency	—	
1 July 2023	CB	Matthew Pennington	Free agency	—	
12 July 2023	CF	Kyle Joseph	Swansea City	Undisclosed	
17 July 2023	CM	Josh Miles	Southport	Undisclosed	
18 July 2023	GK	Mackenzie Chapman	Free agency	—	
16 August 2023	CM	Tashan Oakley-Boothe	Free agency	—	
25 August 2023	CF	Kylian Kouassi	Free agency	—	
31 January 2024	CM	Ryan Finnigan	Southampton	Undisclosed	
1 February 2024	CB	Dan Sassi	Burnley	Undisclosed	

=== Out ===
Date	Pos	Player	To	Fee	Ref
30 June 2023	LW	Keshi Anderson	Free agency	—	
30 June 2023	DM	Liam Bridcutt	Free agency	—	
30 June 2023	LB	Luke Garbutt	Free agency	—	
30 June 2023	LB	Harvey Hughes	Free agency	—	
30 June 2023	LB	Reece James	Sheffield Wednesday	Undisclosed	
30 June 2023	LW	Beryly Lubala	Free agency	—	
30 June 2023	CF	Gary Madine	Free agency	—	
30 June 2023	GK	Chris Maxwell	Free agency	—	
30 June 2023	GK	Stuart Moore	Free agency	—	
30 June 2023	CB	Curtis Nelson	Free agency	—	
30 June 2023	DM	Kevin Stewart	Free agency	—	
30 June 2023	CM	Joe Strawn	Free agency	—	
30 June 2023	CB	Jordan Thorniley	Free agency	—	
12 July 2023	CF	Jerry Yates	Swansea City	Undisclosed	
31 August 2023	DM	Tom Trybull	Free agency	—	
12 January 2024	CB	Doug Tharme	Grimsby Town	Undisclosed	
24 January 2024	CM	Kenny Dougall	Buriram United	Undisclosed	
31 January 2024	CM	Tashan Oakley-Boothe	Free agency	Mutual consent	
1 February 2024	RW	Owen Dale	Oxford United	Undisclosed	

=== Loaned in ===
Date	Pos	Player	From	Fee	Ref
11 August 2023	CM	Jensen Weir	Brighton & Hove Albion	1 January 2024 (Note: On 1 January, Weir was recalled from his initial season-long loan by parent club Brighton.)	
25 August 2023	CF	Jordan Rhodes	Huddersfield Town	End of season	
30 August 2023	RW	Karamoko Dembélé	Brest	End of season	
8 January 2024	LB	Hayden Coulson	Middlesbrough	End of season	
1 February 2024	CM	George Byers	Sheffield Wednesday	End of season	

=== Loaned out ===
Date	Pos	Player	To	Until	Ref
4 August 2023	RB	Jack Moore	Chorley	29 January 2024 (Note: On 3 November, Moore's loan at Chorley was extended until January, before being extended again until the end of that month.)	
27 August 2023	CB	Alex Lankshear	Dorking Wanderers	27 August 2023	
1 September 2023	MF	Rob Apter	Tranmere Rovers	2 January 2024	
1 September 2023	LW	Owen Moffat	Dunfermline Athletic	End of season	
8 September 2023	CF	Zak Emmerson	Eastbourne Borough	1 January 2024	
8 September 2023	CF	Brad Holmes	Southport	30 January 2024 (Note: On 13 December, Holmes' loan at Southport was extended until the end of January.)	
8 September 2023	CM	Luke Mariette	Southport	7 October 2023	
9 November 2023	CM	Dannen Francis	Workington	7 December 2023	
21 November 2023	CM	Luke Mariette	Macclesfield	27 January 2024 (Note: On 27 January, Mariette was recalled from his season-long loan at Macclesfield and subsequently joined Guiseley on loan.)	
15 December 2023	CB	Will Squires	Southport	13 January 2024	
12 January 2024	RW	Rob Apter	Tranmere Rovers	End of season	
12 January 2024	RB	Kwaku Donkor	Havant & Waterlooville	9 March 2024	
12 January 2024	LB	Dominic Thompson	Forest Green Rovers	End of season	
26 January 2024	CM	Luke Mariette	Guiseley	End of season	
30 January 2024	CF	Brad Holmes	Dunfermline Athletic	End of season	
23 February 2024	CB	Dan Sassi	Rochdale	End of season (Note: On 26 March, Sassi's loan at Rochdale was extended until the end of season.)	
