= Daniel Grimshaw =

English footballer (born 1998)

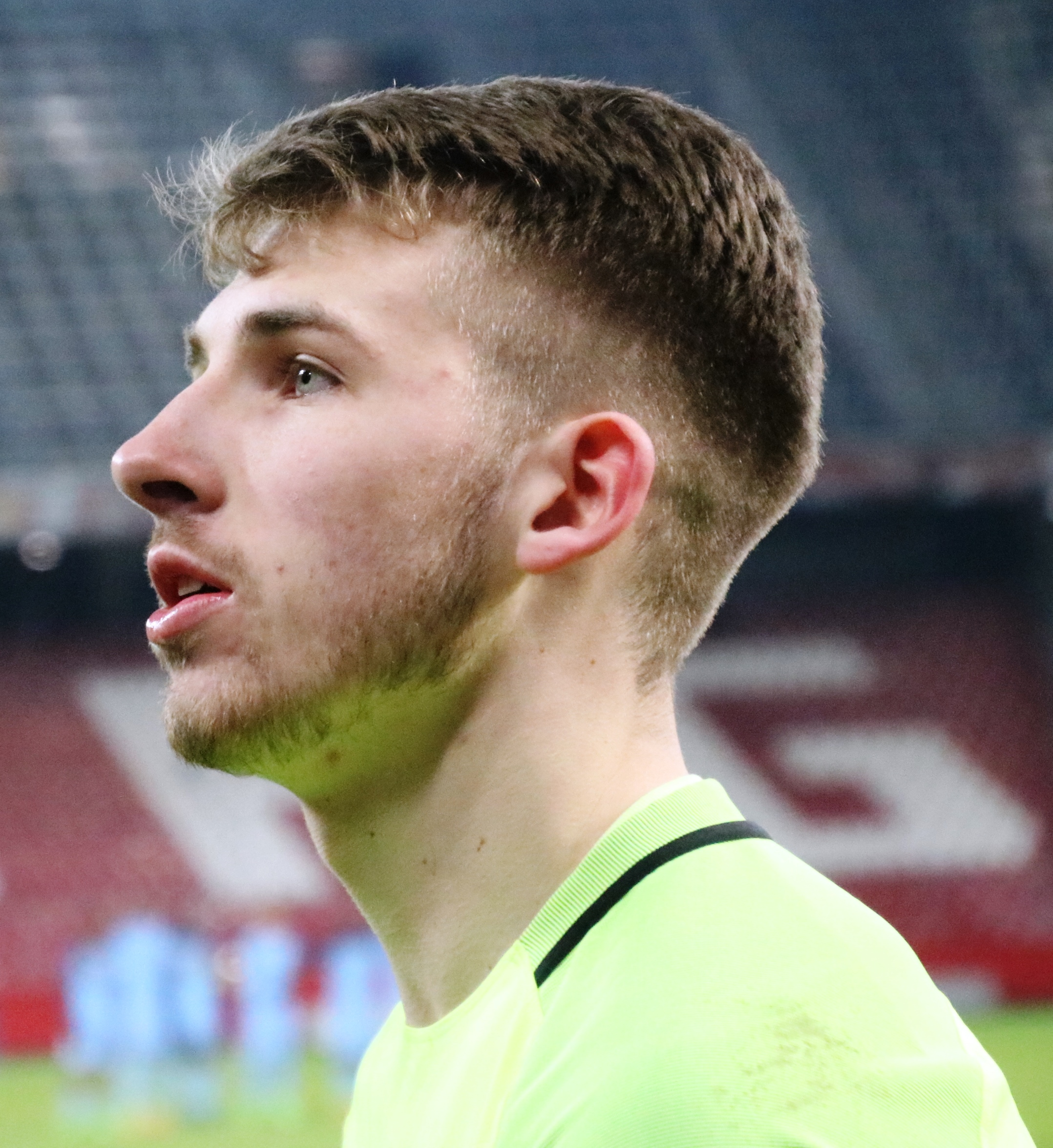
- Grimshaw in 2017

Personal information
- Full name: Daniel James Grimshaw
- Date of birth: 16 January 1998 (age 28)
- Place of birth: Salford, England
- Height: 1.85 m (6 ft 1 in)
- Position: Goalkeeper

Team information
- Current team: Norwich City
- Number: 32

Youth career
- –2021: Manchester City

Senior career*
Years	Team	Apps	(Gls)
2019–2021	Manchester City	0	(0)
2020	→ Hemel Hempstead Town (loan)	7	(0)
2020–2021	→ Lommel (loan)	10	(0)
2021–2024	Blackpool	91	(0)
2024–2025	Plymouth Argyle	21	(0)
2025–	Norwich City	8	(0)
- * Club domestic league appearances and goals as of 20:28, 21 November 2026 (UTC)

Daniel James Grimshaw (born 16 January 1998) is an English professional footballer who plays as a goalkeeper for EFL Championship club Norwich City. He has previously played for Manchester City, Hemel Hempstead Town, Lommel, Blackpool and Plymouth Argyle.

== Career ==
Born in Salford, Grimshaw joined his local club Manchester City as a teenager. In June 2018, he signed a new three-year deal with the club. He was involved in a matchday squad for Manchester City for the first time in January 2019 as an unused substitute in an EFL Cup tie with Burton Albion.

In January 2020, he joined National League South side Hemel Hempstead Town on loan until the end of the season.

On 5 October 2020, he joined Belgian First Division B side Lommel on a season-long loan deal. On 15 February 2021, he made his professional debut in a 1–1 draw with Westerlo.

=== Blackpool ===
Grimshaw joined Blackpool on 1 July 2021 after signing a two-year contract, with the club having the option to extend it for a further twelve months. He joined them on a free transfer as his Manchester City contract had expired.

After an injury to Blackpool's captain Chris Maxwell on 2 October 2021, Grimshaw deputised for nine games. Maxwell returned on 4 December, but was again injured at Derby County the following week. Grimshaw returned to the starting line-up in Blackpool's 3–1 victory over Peterborough United on 18 December.

On 4 July 2022, Grimshaw signed a three-year extension to his contract plus an option for a fourth year.

=== Plymouth Argyle ===
On 23 August 2024, Grimshaw signed for Championship club Plymouth Argyle for an undisclosed fee.

=== Norwich City ===
On 6 June 2025, Grimshaw returned to the Championship following Argyle's relegation, joining Norwich City on a three-year contract for an undisclosed fee.

== Career statistics ==
As of match played 21 November 2026

Appearances and goals by club, season and competition
Club	Season	League			National cup		League cup		Other		Total	
Club	Season	Division	Apps	Goals	Apps	Goals	Apps	Goals	Apps	Goals	Apps	Goals
Manchester City U21	2018–19	—			—		—		3 (Note: Appearances in EFL Trophy)	0	3	0
Manchester City U21	2019–20	—			—		—		5	0	5	0
Manchester City U21	Total		—		—		—		8	0	8	0
Hemel Hempstead Town (loan)	2019–20	National League South	7	0	0	0	—		—		7	0
Lommel (loan)	2020–21	Belgian First Division B	10	0	0	0	—		—		10	0
Blackpool	2021–22	Championship	26	0	1	0	2	0	—		29	0
Blackpool	2022–23	Championship	18	0	0	0	0	0	—		18	0
Blackpool	2023–24	League One	45	0	2	0	0	0	0	0	47	0
Blackpool	2024–25	League One	2	0	—		—		—		2	0
Blackpool	Total		91	0	3	0	2	0	0	0	96	0
Plymouth Argyle	2024–25	Championship	21	0	0	0	1	0	—		22	0
Norwich City	2025–26	Championship	1	0	3	0	2	0	—		6	0
Norwich City	2026–27	Championship	7	0	0	0	2	0	—		9	0
Norwich City	Total		8	0	3	0	4	0	0	0	15	0
Career total			120	0	6	0	7	0	8	0	141	0
