= Karamoko Dembélé =

Footballer (born 2003)

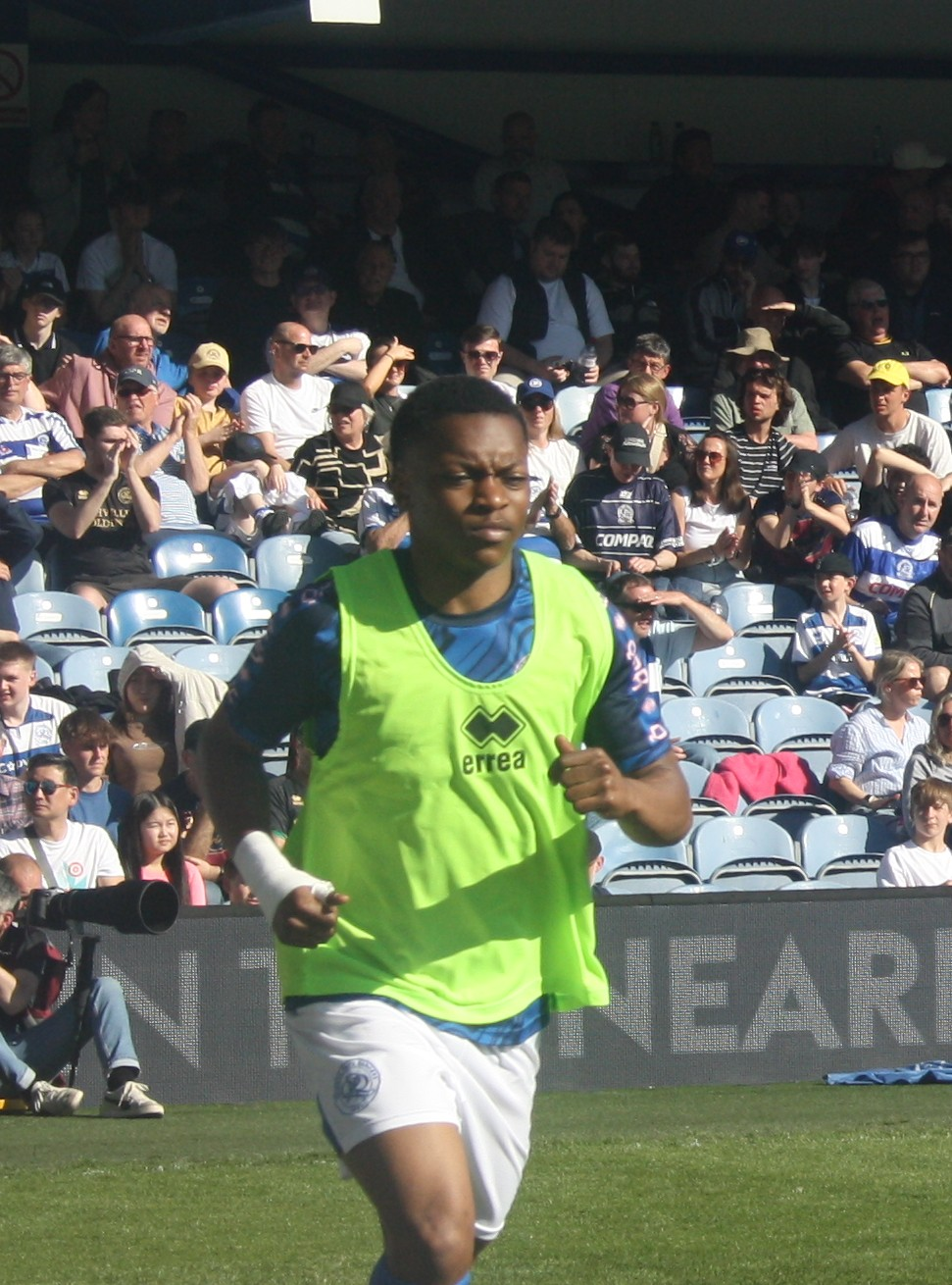
- Dembélé in 2025

Personal information
- Full name: Karamoko Kader Dembélé
- Date of birth: 22 February 2003 (age 23)
- Place of birth: Lambeth, South London, England
- Height: 1.68 m (5 ft 6 in)
- Position: Winger

Team information
- Current team: Queens Park Rangers
- Number: 7

Youth career
- 2008–2013: Park Villa Boys Club
- 2013–2019: Celtic

Senior career*
Years	Team	Apps	(Gls)
2019–2022	Celtic	8	(1)
2022–2025	Brest	16	(0)
2023–2024	→ Blackpool (loan)	39	(8)
2024–2025	→ Queens Park Rangers (loan)	23	(3)
2025–	Queens Park Rangers	28	(1)

International career^{‡}
2016–2017	Scotland U16	8	(1)
2016–2017	England U15	3	(0)
2018	Scotland U17	2	(0)
2019	England U17	4	(1)
2021	England U18	1	(0)
- * Club domestic league appearances and goals as of 22:02, 1 March 2025 (UTC) ‡ National team caps and goals as of 21:36, 29 March 2021 (UTC)

Karamoko Kader Dembélé (born 22 February 2003) is an English professional footballer who plays as a winger for EFL Championship club Queens Park Rangers. Born in England and raised in Scotland, Dembélé previously represented Scotland as a youth international before switching his allegiance to England.

Dembélé attracted media attention in October 2016, when he made his debut for Celtic's under-20 development team at the age of 13.

== Early life ==
Dembélé was born in 2003 in Lambeth, South London, to parents from Ivory Coast. His family moved north to Scotland, to Govan, before his first birthday. Dembélé, or "Kaddy" as he is known, attended St Constantine's Primary School in Drumoyne. He started at St Ninian's High School in Kirkintilloch (the affiliated school for Celtic's academy players) in 2015.

== Club career ==
=== Celtic ===
Dembélé started playing football for Park Villa Boys Club at the age of five and was recognised as a prodigy from a young age. He joined Celtic aged 10 in 2013. In July 2016, Dembélé was named as player of the tournament when representing Celtic under-13s at the St Kevin's Boys Academy Cup. Soon after his appointment as Celtic head coach, Brendan Rodgers invited Dembélé to participate in a light technical training session with the first-team squad.

On 3 October 2016, Dembélé gained widespread media attention after making his debut for Celtic's under-20 side aged 13 playing with and against players who were up to seven age groups above him. He was named on the bench because several regular starters were away playing for Scotland's under-19 team and was brought on during the 81st minute, replacing the youngest first-team player in Celtic's history, 16-year-old Jack Aitchison. A match report on the official Celtic website stated that "the diminutive playmaker didn't look out of place and played his part in the closing stages." The response to Dembélé's under-20s debut included concern about the physical and mental impact of such a young player being fast-tracked through the developmental ranks. On 2 June 2017, Dembélé signed a youth registration contract to stay at Celtic.

On 24 December 2018, aged 15, Dembélé signed his first professional contract with Celtic, set to keep him at the club until 2021. In April 2019, he featured for Celtic's academy team in the seasonal finals of both the Scottish Youth Cup and the Glasgow Cup, losing out 3–2 to Rangers in the first and beating the same opposition by the same scoreline in the second.

Dembélé made his senior debut on 19 May 2019 in a 2–1 victory against Hearts, coming on as a second-half substitute. After the match, Dembélé collected his winners' medal and helped to lift the Scottish Premiership trophy as Celtic ended the season nine points clear at the top of the league. His performance was praised by manager Neil Lennon. Six days later, Dembélé was named in the squad for the 2019 Scottish Cup Final, also against Hearts. This time he did not leave the bench, but collected a winners' medal following Celtic's 2–1 victory. In October 2019, L'Équipe named Dembélé as one of six "outstanding young players set to revolutionise the game", a list that also included Barcelona's Ansu Fati. On 12 December 2019, Dembélé became the youngest-ever footballer to play for a Scottish team in European competition when he came on as a substitute in Celtic's 2–0 loss away against Romanian side CFR Cluj.

Dembélé rarely featured for the first team after that, but he did come on as a substitute against St Johnstone on 12 May 2021, and scored his first senior goal in a 4–0 win for Celtic, latching onto a pass from David Turnbull and scoring from a tight angle. He sustained a fractured ankle during a pre-season friendly against Bristol City in July 2021, and eventually had to undergo an operation in October 2021. He made his return to action on 13 February 2022, playing in Celtic B's 4–0 win over Vale of Leithen in a Lowland Football League fixture. After being an unused substitute in three first-team games, as well as scoring for the B side in a Glasgow Cup tie against Queen's Park, Dembélé finally returned to first-team action on 2 March 2022, when he came on as a substitute for Jota near the end of Celtic's 2–0 win over St Mirren.

=== Brest ===
Having left Celtic after nine years, following the expiration of his contract, Dembélé joined French club Brest on a free transfer on 5 July 2022, signing a four-year contract with the Ligue 1 side.

==== Loan to Blackpool ====
On 30 August 2023, Dembélé signed for EFL League One club Blackpool on a season-long loan. He scored his first goal for the club in a 2–2 draw away to Charlton Athletic in October.

On April 13, Dembélé scored after only 22 seconds in a 1–0 win against Carlisle United. It was his eighth goal of the season.

Dembélé's eight goals and 14 assists throughout the season contributed significantly to Blackpool's EFL League One promotion push, and for his efforts he was recognised as the club's 'Junior Seasiders Player of the Season,' 'Players' Player of the Season' and 'Supporters' Player of the Season' for the 2023–2024 campaign, prior to their final game against Reading.

==== Queens Park Rangers (loan) ====
On 13 August 2024, Dembélé returned to England, joining Championship club Queens Park Rangers on a season-long loan.

On 30 September, Queens Park Rangers announced that Dembélé will join the English club permanently, effective from the summer of 2025.

== International career ==
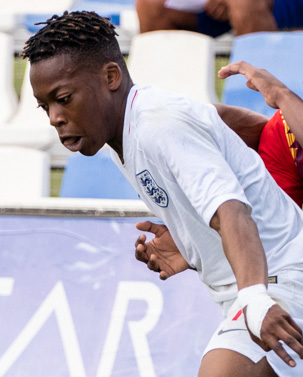
Dembélé playing for England under-17s in 2019.

Dembélé is eligible to represent Scotland, England or the Ivory Coast internationally. On 19 October 2016, he was called up to the Scotland national under-16 football team for the 2016 Victory Shield. He made his debut for the Scotland under-16s on 1 November, coming on as a second-half substitute during a 2–2 draw against Wales. Coach Brian McLaughlin commented: "He was excellent. He looked confident and it's a very good group to come into." Dembélé made a further appearance a few days later in a 3–0 defeat, as a 63rd-minute substitute against the Republic of Ireland.

Prior to participating in the Victory Shield, Dembélé travelled south in October 2016 to train with England under-15s at St George's Park. On 18 November 2016, Dembélé confirmed his intention to join up with the England under-15s ahead of a match against Turkey that December. On 17 December 2016, Dembélé came off the bench against Turkey to make his England debut and assisted a goal in a 5–2 victory. On 16 February 2017, Dembélé made his first start for England under-15 in a match against Belgium.

He also continued to represent Scotland, playing an integral part in the Scotland under-16 squads for two UEFA development tournaments in 2017, both of which Scotland won. Most notably, Dembélé featured in a Scotland victory over England in July 2017. On 19 August 2018, he made his debut for Scotland under-17s in a 1–0 away win against Russia, coming on as a 50th-minute substitution for Connor Barron, and went on to start two days later against Russia.

On 10 October 2019, Dembélé made his debut for England under-17s during a 3–3 draw with Germany at the Pinatar Arena in Spain. Dembélé scored his first goal for this age group during a 1–1 draw with Spain on 14 October 2019. Dembélé played four England U17 games.

On 29 March 2021, Dembélé made his debut for England U18s during a 2–0 win away to Wales at the Leckwith Stadium. Dembélé was replaced at half-time. That half-game was his only taste of international football at U18 level and his most recent international football match at any age group. He ended his age group international career with 10 Scottish and eight English caps.

== Personal life ==
Dembélé's older brother, Siriki Dembélé, plays as a winger. Another brother, Hassan, was playing for Celtic's academy in November 2017.

== Career statistics ==
As of match played 20 December 2025

Appearances and goals by club, season and competition
Club	Season	League			National cup (Note: Includes Scottish Cup, FA Cup)		League cup (Note: Includes Scottish League Cup, EFL Cup)		Europe		Other		Total	
Club	Season	Division	Apps	Goals	Apps	Goals	Apps	Goals	Apps	Goals	Apps	Goals	Apps	Goals
Celtic	2018–19	Scottish Premiership	1	0	—		—		—		—		1	0
Celtic	2019–20	Scottish Premiership	1	0	—		—		1	0	—		2	0
Celtic	2020–21	Scottish Premiership	5	1	—		—		0	0	—		5	1
Celtic	2021–22	Scottish Premiership	1	0	1	0	—		0	0	—		2	0
Celtic	Total		8	1	1	0	0	0	1	0	0	0	10	1
Brest	2022–23	Ligue 1	15	0	2	0	—		—		—		17	0
Brest	2023–24	Ligue 1	1	0	—		—		—		—		1	0
Brest	Total		16	0	2	0	0	0	0	0	0	0	18	0
Blackpool (loan)	2023–24	League One	39	8	4	1	—		—		4 (Note: Appearances in EFL Trophy)	0	47	9
Queens Park Rangers (loan)	2024–25	Championship	23	3	0	0	2	0	—		—		25	3
Queens Park Rangers	2025–26	Championship	20	1	0	0	0	0	—		—		20	1
Career total			106	13	7	1	2	0	1	0	4	0	120	14

== Honours ==
Celtic

- Scottish Premiership: 2021–22
- Scottish Cup: 2018–19
- Glasgow Cup: 2018–19

Individual

- Blackpool Supporters' Player of the Season: 2023–24
- Blackpool Players' Player of the Season: 2023–24

== See also ==
- List of sportspeople who competed for more than one nation
