= Mike Garrity (association football) =

English football coach

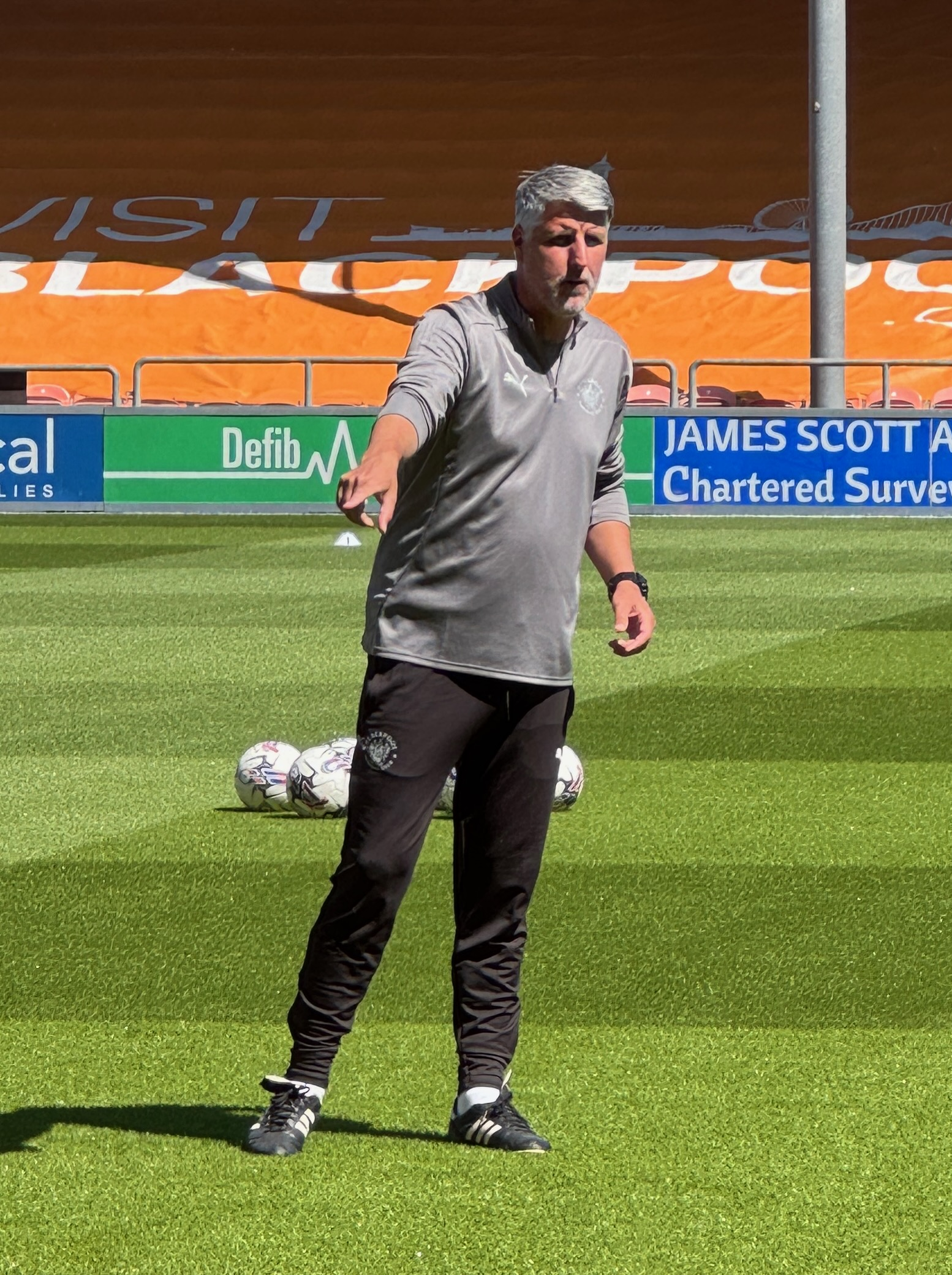
- Garrity in 2024

Personal information
- Date of birth: 6 May 1980 (age 46)
- Place of birth: England

Mike Garrity (born 6 May 1980) is an English football coach. He was most recently assistant head coach at Scottish Premiership club Heart of Midlothian.

== Career ==
Garrity moved, with Neil Critchley, from Liverpool's Academy to Blackpool after Critchley was appointed head coach of the Bloomfield Road club in June 2020. He was joined by Iain Brunskill, who worked with both Critchley and Garrity at Liverpool.

In June 2022, after Critchley left Blackpool to become assistant to Steven Gerrard at Aston Villa, Garrity was appointed to the coaching staff at Lincoln City.

He followed Critchley to Queens Park Rangers as assistant manager in December 2022, two months after Gerrard was sacked by Aston Villa.

The duo returned to Blackpool in 2023, when Critchley was reappointed as the club's head coach. They were again joined by Iain Brunskill for the 2023–24 season, and former Blackpool player Richard Keogh in 2024–25. Critchley and Garrity were sacked on 21 August 2024, with Keogh stepping in as interim manager.

Garrity followed Critchley to Heart of Midlothian in October 2024.

He has also coached for Molde and China.
