= Iain Brunskill =

English football coach

Personal information
- Full name: Iain Richard Brunskill
- Date of birth: 5 November 1976 (age 49)
- Place of birth: Ormskirk, England
- Position: Midfielder

Youth career
- –1996: Liverpool

Senior career*
Years	Team	Apps	(Gls)
1996-1997	Bury	2	(0)
1997–1999	Leek Town	80	
1999	Runcorn Halton	35	
Total		117	(2+)

Managerial career
- 2008–2010: Blackburn Rovers U23
- 2013: Floriana
- 2016–2018: Jordan Olympic
- 2018: Shanghai SIPG U21
- * Club domestic league appearances and goals

Iain Richard Brunskill (born 5 November 1976) is an English football coach and former footballer who played as a midfielder.

== Playing career ==
A midfielder, Brunskill was an England international at schoolboy and youth level, before joining Liverpool as a full-time player. Between 1995 and 1996, Brunskill was a trainee and young professional player at Liverpool, making over 50 appearances for Liverpool's reserve team. In 1996, he joined Bury, where he remained for a season. In 1997, he joined Leek Town in the Vauxhall Conference, making 80 appearances, followed by stints at Hednesford Town and Runcorn Halton, for whom he made one appearance in the FA Cup. Overall, he made over 200 appearances in professional and semi-professional football, before retiring at age 26 to pursue a full-time career in coaching.

== Coaching career ==
In 1998, Brunskill began his coaching career with Liverpool as Assistant Academy Technical Director, a role he held for ten years.

After leaving Anfield, Brunskill became reserve-team manager and first-team coach at Blackburn Rovers, working with Paul Ince initially, then Sam Allardyce.

After four seasons at Ewood Park, in 2013 he took on his first head-coach role, at Maltese club Floriana. He was given a ten-game contract, which lasted from January to May.

In 2013, he became a youth coach educator with the Football Association.

Brunskill next joined Bolton Wanderers' player development department, before beginning a two-year role as the Under-23s coach of the Jordan national team.

He undertook a consultancy role at Chinese Super League club Shanghai SIPG, then joined Norwegian club Molde as Head of academy.

In 2018, the Chinese Football Association hired Brunskill as the head of its technical department.

After three years in China, he joined Norwich City as senior development coach in January 2022.

On 9 February 2022, Brunskill was appointed assistant head coach to Neil Critchley at Blackpool, replacing Stuart McCall, who left for Sheffield United three months earlier. He worked with Blackpool's first-team coach Mike Garrity at Liverpool.

On 11 December 2022, following the appointment of Critchley as head coach of Queens Park Rangers, Brunskill followed him as joint assistant head coach.

He returned to Blackpool, again under Critchley, in June 2023, only to leave the role in June 2024 to join Romanian Liga I club Rapid București as assistant coach under Neil Lennon.
