= Neil Critchley =

English football manager (born 1978)

Personal information
- Full name: Neil Critchley
- Date of birth: 18 October 1978 (age 48)
- Place of birth: Crewe, Cheshire, England
- Position: Midfielder

Team information
- Current team: Ipswich Town (assistant coach)

Youth career
- 1989–: Crewe Alexandra

Senior career*
Years	Team	Apps	(Gls)
1999–2000	Crewe Alexandra	1	(0)
2000–2001	Leigh RMI	3	(0)
Total		4	(0)

Managerial career
- 2020–2022: Blackpool
- 2022–2023: Queens Park Rangers
- 2023–2024: Blackpool
- 2024–2025: Heart of Midlothian
- * Club domestic league appearances and goals

Neil Critchley (born 18 October 1978) is an English football manager and former player who is assistant coach of Premier League club Ipswich Town.

He played one match in the Football League for Crewe Alexandra, then of the First Division.

Critchley has previously managed Liverpool under-18s, standing in for Jürgen Klopp for two of Liverpool's cup fixtures in the 2019–20 season. He guided Blackpool to promotion, via the playoffs, from League One to the Championship in 2020–21, his first full season in charge of the club. After a short stint as assistant head coach to Steven Gerrard at Aston Villa in 2022, Critchley was appointed head coach of Queens Park Rangers. He was sacked after two months, having won one game from his first twelve. Critchley returned to Blackpool in May 2023, but was sacked the following August.

As of 2020, he is one of sixteen coaches worldwide to have obtained UEFA's elite badge.

== Playing career ==
Critchley, aged 10, joined Crewe Alexandra in 1989. The club was then managed by Dario Gradi who had recently started a player development scheme that became the Crewe Alexandra F.C. Academy. Gradi noticed Critchley's ability, even at the age of 17, to coach younger players and encouraged him to become more fully involved.

Critchley's only playing appearance for Crewe came in a 3–0 defeat away at Fulham during the 1999–2000 season. He signed for Leigh RMI in 2000, and made three league appearances as substitute for the club.

== Coaching and managerial career ==
Critchley retired as a player aged 24 and became a coach at Crewe, working under Gradi and Steve Holland, and being appointed joint Academy director in 2007, before joining Liverpool as under-18s coach in 2013.

=== Liverpool ===
Due to fixture congestion of Liverpool's first team during the 2019–20 season, Critchley served as their stand-in manager for their EFL Cup away match against Aston Villa on 17 December 2019. The congestion was caused by Liverpool's participation in the 2019 FIFA Club World Cup in Qatar, which overlapped with the EFL Cup quarter-finals. Liverpool, fielding a team made up exclusively of under-23s, were beaten 5–0. Critchley again served as Liverpool's stand-in manager for the FA Cup fourth round replay against Shrewsbury Town on 4 February 2020, as the first team were on a mid-season break. The youthful Liverpool team won 1–0 via an own goal.

=== Blackpool ===
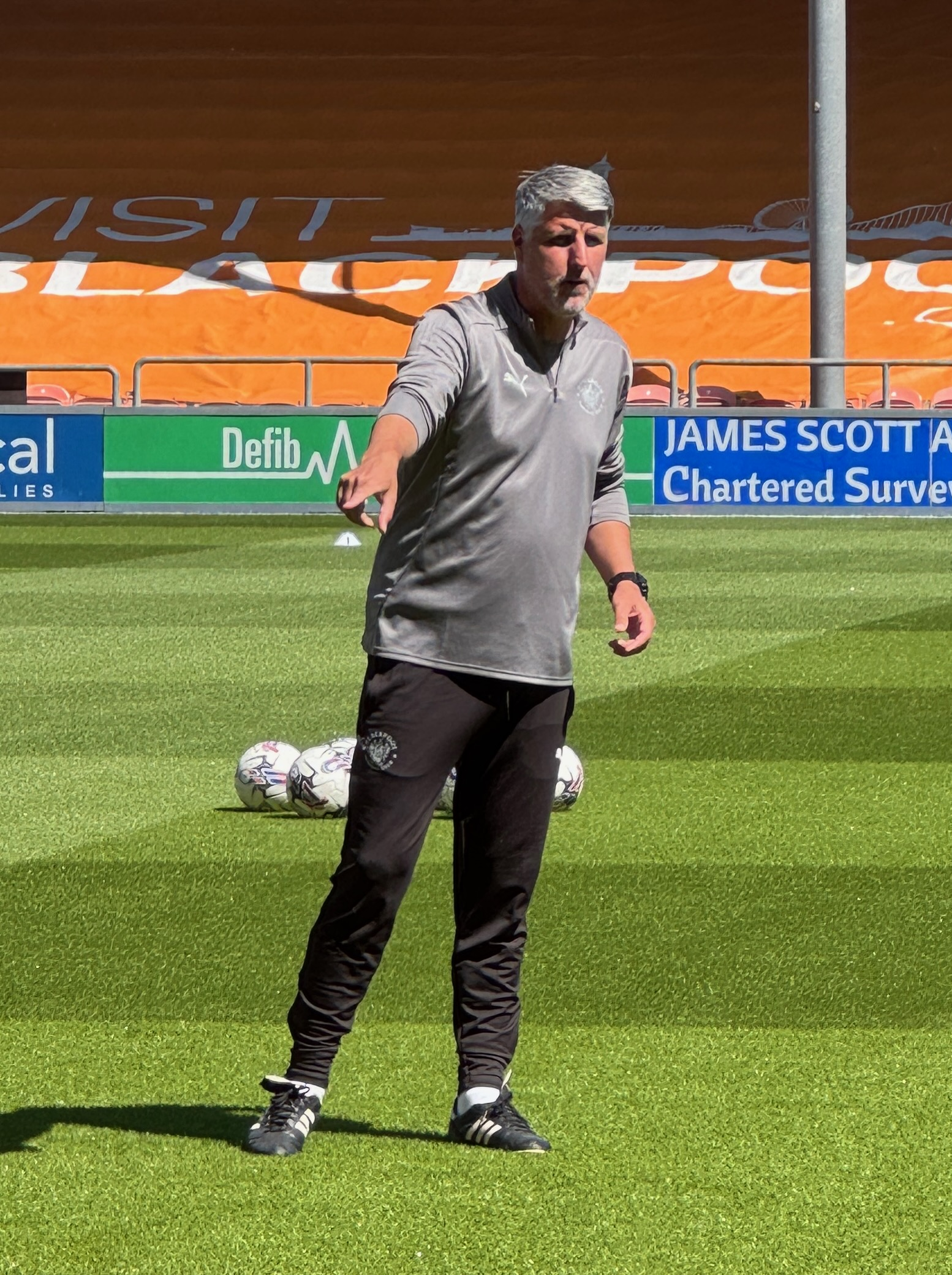
Mike Garrity, Critchley's assistant at Blackpool for both of his stints

On 2 March 2020, Critchley was appointed as head coach of Blackpool on a three-and-a-half-year contract. He chose Mike Garrity to be his assistant, the two having worked together at Liverpool. After a curtailed regular season due to the COVID-19 pandemic in the United Kingdom, Blackpool finished in 13th position after standings were amended to reflect a points-per-game ratio.

In Critchley's first full season in charge, 2020–21, Blackpool finished third at the conclusion of the regular season, going on to win promotion via the EFL League One play-offs.

On 19 November 2021, Critchley signed a four-year extension to his contract, keeping him at Bloomfield Road until 2026. The following week, Critchley was named Manager of the Season at the annual North West Football Awards, beating Manchester City's Pep Guardiola, Blackpool's former captain and Bolton Wanderers manager Ian Evatt, and Morecambe manager Derek Adams.

=== Aston Villa (assistant) ===
On 2 June 2022, Critchley departed Blackpool after accepting the role of assistant head coach to Steven Gerrard at Aston Villa. He had told Blackpool's owner Simon Sadler that he was keen to work again with Gerrard and "pit himself against some of the best coaches in the world". On 21 October 2022, Critchley departed Aston Villa, following the sacking of Gerrard the day prior.

=== Queens Park Rangers ===
On 11 December 2022, Critchley was appointed head coach of Championship club Queens Park Rangers on a three-and-a-half-year deal. His first match in charge was a single-goal victory over Preston North End. On 19 February 2023, Critchley was relieved of his duties as head coach of Queens Park Rangers, with the victory over Preston North End being the team's sole victory during his two months in charge.

=== Return to Blackpool ===
On 23 May 2023, Critchley returned to his former club Blackpool, on a four-year deal, following their relegation to League One. Mike Garrity also returned as assistant manager, alongside Iain Brunskill for the 2023–24 campaign. Critchley was sacked on 21 August 2024.

=== Heart of Midlothian ===
On 15 October 2024, two months after departing Blackpool, Critchley was appointed head coach of Scottish Premiership club Heart of Midlothian. Hearts were bottom of the early league table when Critchley was appointed. An improvement in results meant they pulled away from that position, and Critchley won the Premiership manager of the month award for January 2025. He was criticised for failing to win "big" games, highlighted by the team losing successive derbies against Hibs. A draw with Motherwell meant that Hearts finished in the bottom half of the league.

Critchley was sacked by Hearts following a home defeat by Dundee on 26 April 2025, after six months in charge.

== Managerial statistics ==
As of match played 26 April 2025

Managerial record by team and tenure
Team	Nat	From	To	Record				
Team	Nat	From	To	G	W	D	L	Win %
Liverpool (stand-in)	(England)	17 December 2019	4 February 2020	2	1	0	1	50.00
Blackpool	(England)	2 March 2020	2 June 2022	109	45	30	34	41.28
Queens Park Rangers	(England)	11 December 2022	19 February 2023	12	1	5	6	8.33
Blackpool	(England)	23 May 2023	21 August 2024	62	30	12	20	48.39
Heart of Midlothian	(Scotland)	15 October 2024	26 April 2025	35	14	7	14	40.00
Total				220	91	54	75	41.36

== Honours ==
Blackpool

- EFL League One play-offs: 2021

Hearts

- Scottish Premiership Manager of the Month: January 2025

== Personal life ==
Critchley is married to Janine.
