= Brad Holmes (footballer) =

English footballer

Personal information
- Full name: Bradley Mason Holmes
- Date of birth: 16 December 2002 (age 23)
- Place of birth: Blackpool, England
- Height: 1.86 m (6 ft 1 in)
- Position: Forward

Team information
- Current team: Curzon Ashton

Youth career
- –2020: Bolton Wanderers

Senior career*
Years	Team	Apps	(Gls)
2020–2024	Blackpool	7	(0)
2021	→ FC United of Manchester (loan)	12	(5)
2021–2022	→ Chorley (loan)	20	(3)
2022	→ AFC Fylde (loan)	5	(0)
2022–2023	→ Hyde United (loan)	3	(0)
2023	→ Southport (loan)	19	(4)
2024	→ Dunfermline Athletic (loan)	13	(0)
2024-2025	Marine	19	(2)
2025	→ Hyde United (loan)	14	(4)
2025-	Curzon Ashton	4	(3)
- * Club domestic league appearances and goals as of 19:31, 25 July 2025 (UTC)

Bradley Mason Holmes (born 16 December 2002) is an English semi-professional footballer who plays as a forward for Curzon Ashton.

== Career ==
Holmes signed a professional contract with Blackpool in the summer of 2020, and made his first-team debut for the club on 20 April 2021, in a League defeat at Rochdale. He made his first start for the club the following month, in a single-goal League One victory over Bristol Rovers at Bloomfield Road on 9 May.

He joined F.C. United of Manchester on loan on 14 September 2021. As of 5 October, he had scored four goals in six games for the club, including one on his debut.

Holmes went out on loan again, to Chorley, on 22 December 2021.

After a one-month loan spell with AFC Fylde between August and September 2022, on 23 September he joined Hyde United, also on loan, until January 2023.

On 30 January 2024, Holmes joined Scottish Championship club Dunfermline Athletic on loan until the end of the season.

Hyde United announced the loan signing of Holmes from Marine for one month on 9 January 2025.

Holmes signed for Curzon Ashton in July 2025.

== Career statistics ==
As of match played 29 August 2022

Appearances and goals by club, season and competition
Club	Season	League			FA Cup		EFL Cup		Other		Total	
Club	Season	Division	Apps	Goals	Apps	Goals	Apps	Goals	Apps	Goals	Apps	Goals
Blackpool	2020–21	League One	5	0	0	0	0	0	0	0	5	0
Blackpool	2021–22	Championship	0	0	—		0	0	—		0	0
Blackpool	2022–23	Championship	2	0	0	0	0	0	—		2	0
Blackpool	Total		5	0	0	0	0	0	0	0	5	0
F.C. United of Manchester (loan)	2021–22	NPL Premier Division	12	5	2	0	—		1 (Note: Appearance(s) in FA Trophy)	0	15	5
Chorley (loan)	2021–22	National League North	20	3	—		—		1 (Note: Appearance(s) in National League North play-offs)	0	21	3
AFC Fylde (loan)	2022–23	National League North	5	0	—		—		—		5	0
Career total			42	8	2	0	0	0	2	0	46	8
