= Luke Mariette =

Welsh footballer

Personal information
- Full name: Luke James Mariette
- Date of birth: 8 October 2003 (age 23)
- Place of birth: Denbigh, Wales
- Position: Midfielder

Team information
- Current team: Buckley Town

Youth career
- Blackpool

Senior career*
| Years | Team | Apps | (Gls) |
| 2021–2024 | Blackpool | 1 | (0) |
| 2022 | → Curzon Ashton (loan) | 5 | (0) |
| 2023 | → Southport (loan) | 2 | (0) |
| 2023–2024 | → Macclesfield (loan) | 4 | (0) |
| 2024 | → Guiseley (loan) | 1 | (1) |
| 2024–2025 | Flint Town United | 24 | (1) |
| 2025– | Buckley Town | 40 | (7) |

International career^{‡}
| 2021 | Wales U18 | 1 | (0) |
- * Club domestic league appearances and goals as of 08:58, 8 November 2026 (UTC) ‡ National team caps and goals as of 20:02, 7 May 2022 (UTC)

Luke James Mariette (born 8 October 2003) is a Welsh professional footballer who plays as a midfielder for Buckley Town.

== Career ==
On 19 April 2021, Mariette signed his first professional contract with Blackpool. He went on loan to Curzon Ashton for the remainder of the 2021–22 season in March 2022.

He debuted with the senior Blackpool side in a 5–0 EFL Championship loss to Peterborough United on 7 May 2022, coming on as a substitute in the 69th minute.

In September 2023, Mariette joined Southport on loan. He joined Macclesfield on loan until the end of the season in November 2023. In January 2024, he joined Guiseley on loan for the remainder of the season.

On 29 August 2024, Mariette joined Cymru Premier club Flint Town United.

In 2025 he joined Buckley Town.

== International career ==
Mariette is a youth international for Wales, having represented the Wales U18s in March 2018.
