= St John's Gardens, Manchester =

Garden in Manchester, England

Coordinates: 53°28′40″N 2°15′10″W

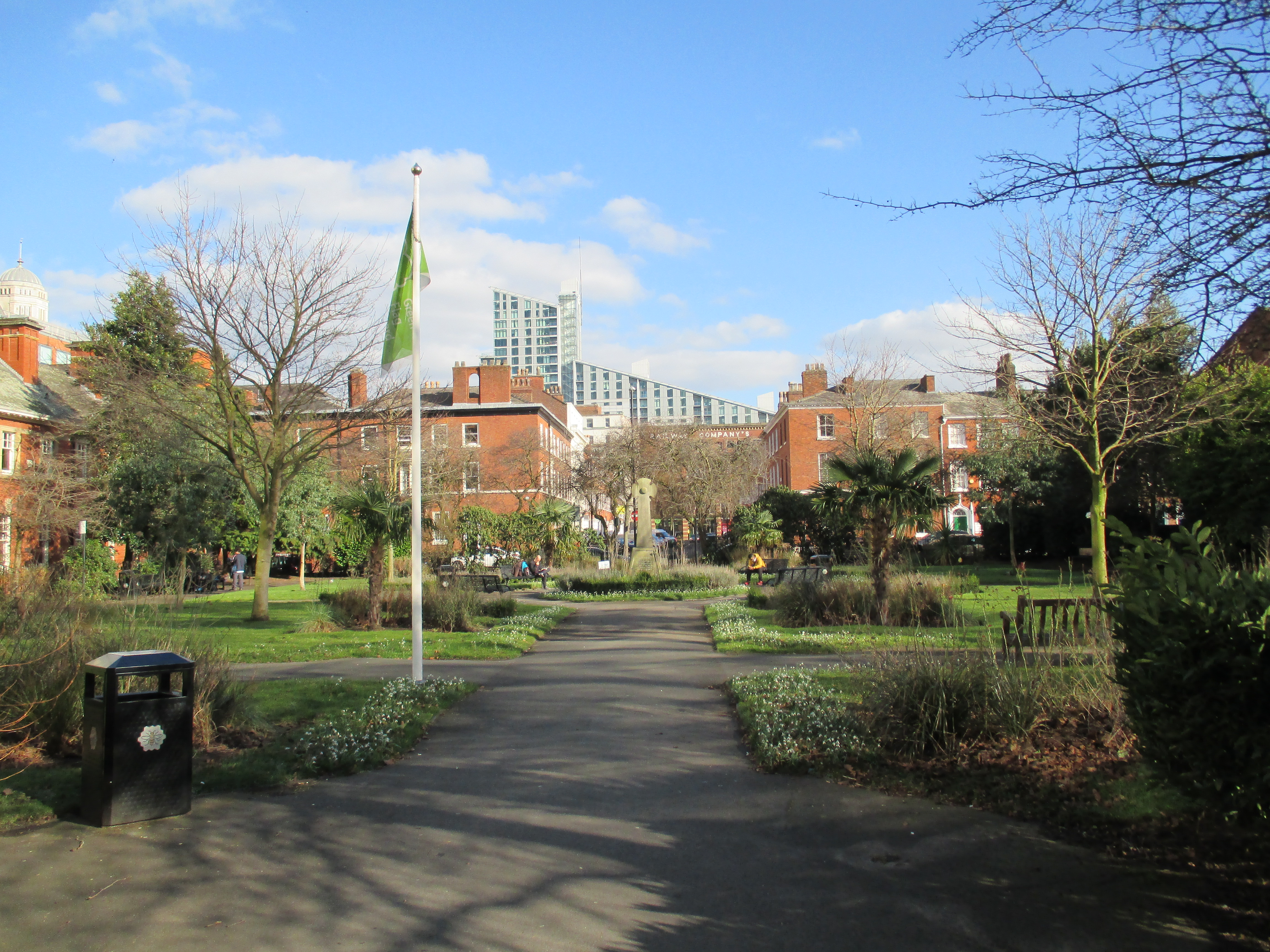
St John's Gardens, Manchester

St John's Gardens in central Manchester, England, lies between Lower Byrom Street, Byrom Street and Quay Street. Previously occupied by St John's Church and its graveyard between 1769 and 1931, the site was redeveloped into a formal garden in 1932. It contains a central memorial to the church and those buried in its graveyard, whose tombstones have been covered over by 18 inches (460 mm) of soil except for that of John Owens, founder of Owen's College.

The garden was awarded a Green Flag in 2012 and is part of the St John Street conservation area.

== Background ==
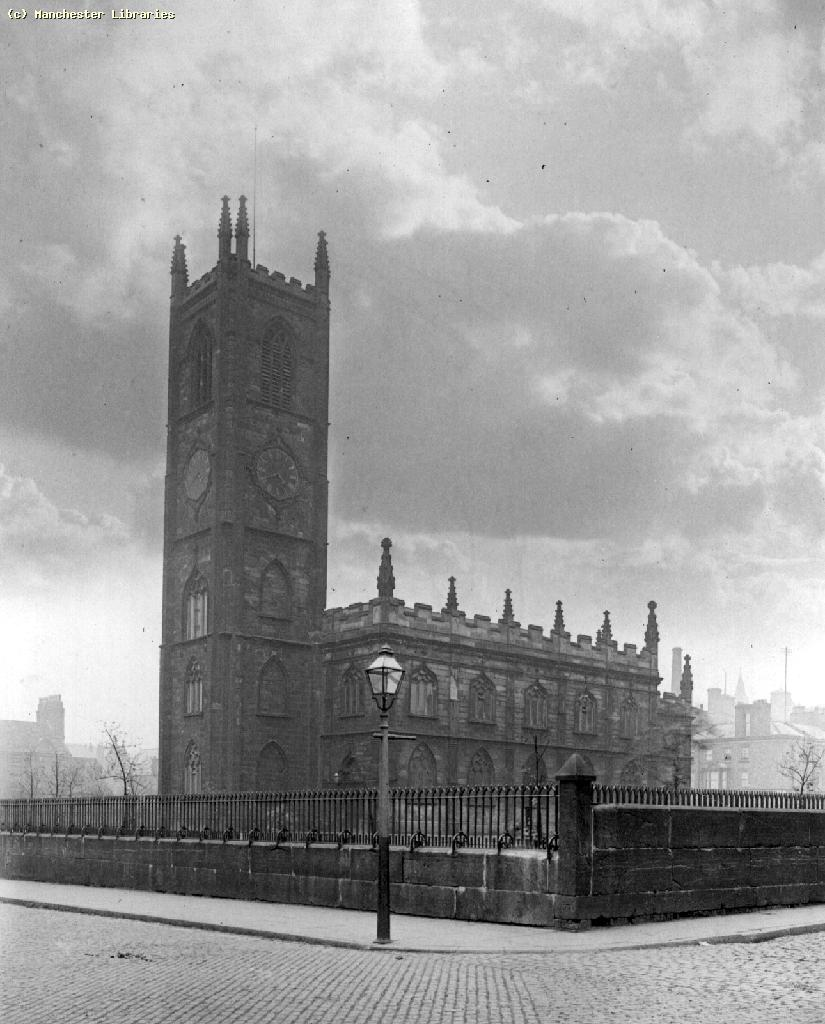
St John's Church, Manchester

St John's Church was built on the site now occupied by the gardens in 1769 in response to the needs of a rapidly rising population. Its founder was Edward Byrom (13 June 1724 – 24 April 1773), a co-founder of the first bank in Manchester and the oldest surviving son of John Byrom, whose family was well known in the area.

The residential area around the church changed in character during the 19th century, as properties once occupied by affluent families became lodging houses and the locale became a place of business. Falling attendances led to a merger with St Matthew's parish in 1927. In 1929, the Ecclesiastical Commissioners proposed to hand over the site to Manchester Corporation, in the hope that it would be converted into an open space similar to Parsonage Gardens. The church was demolished in 1931.

== Garden ==
In March 1914, Manchester Corporation was negotiating with the Ecclesiastical Commissioners to turn St John's dreary city-centre churchyard from an "eyesore" to a garden planted with trees and shrubs. The church is commemorated by a stone cross in the garden; a plaque states that more than 22,000 bodies lie buried in the vicinity. Among those buried in the churchyard are John Owens, founder of Owens College, the forerunner of Manchester University, and William Marsden, who successfully campaigned for the introduction of a half-day holiday for workers on Saturdays. With the exception of Owens' grave, the tombstones in the churchyard were covered with 18 inches (46 cm) of soil. A garden and children's playground was formally opened on 10 February 1932.

The Black or Manchester Poplar Populus nigra subspecies betulifolia, Britain's most endangered native tree, was planted in the garden. Like the London plane, the only other British tree named after a city, it is one of the few trees that can survive in heavily polluted conditions.

In 2011 an orchard of twelve crab apple trees and wildflowers designed by Daniela Coray, was moved to the garden after the RHS Tatton Park Flower Show. Coray, RHS National Young Designer of the Year, had been awarded a gold award for the design, A Stitch in Time Saves Nine.

The garden was awarded a Green Flag in 2012 for promoting a "welcoming, safe and well-maintained" environment. and is in the St John Street conservation area.
