= St John's Church, Manchester =

Church in Manchester, United Kingdom

Coordinates: 53°28′40″N 2°15′10″W

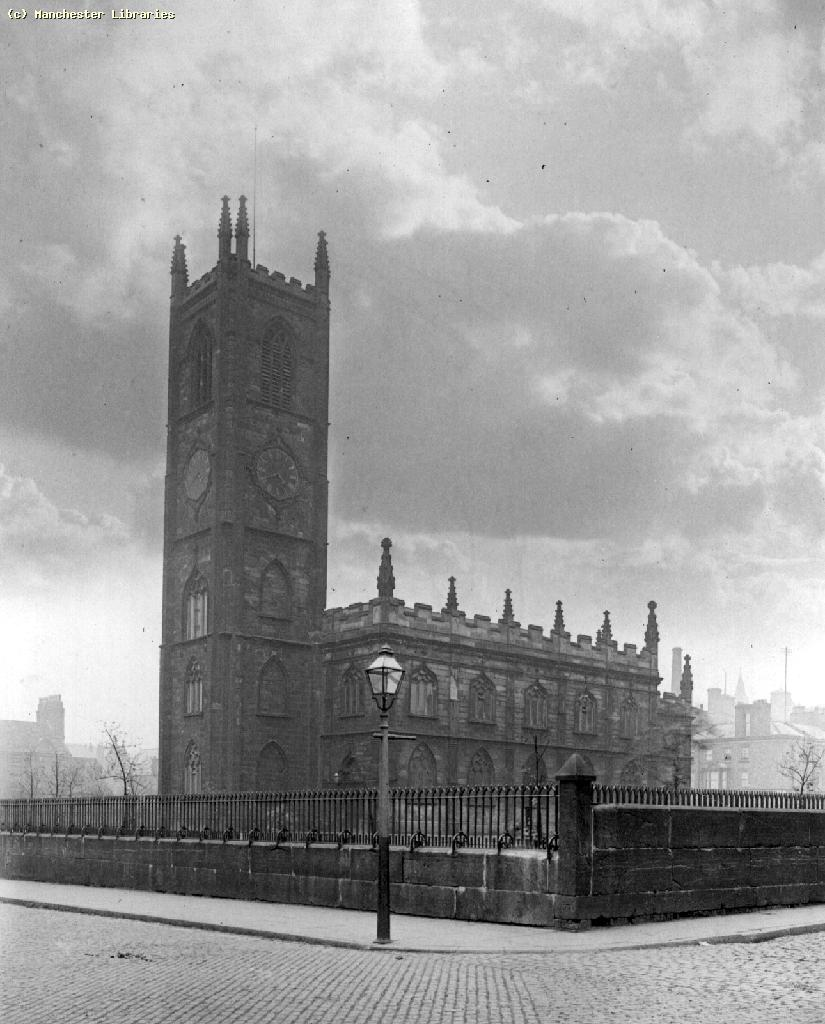
St John's Church, Manchester, c. 1900

St John's Church, Manchester, also known as St John's, Deansgate, was an Anglican parish church in Manchester, England, established in 1769 and demolished in 1931. Its site is now that of St John's Gardens, situated between Lower Byrom Street, Byrom Street and Quay Street.

St John's Church was built in 1769 by Edward Byrom, a co-founder of the first bank in Manchester. Its parish encompassed a large and important section of the city of Manchester. The first rector, John Clowes, held the office for 62 years until his death in 1831. Clowes preached the first Sunday school sermon in the Manchester area, introduced Swedenborgianism there and was prominent in championing Whit Walks. Clowes was succeeded by William Huntington, who had held the post of curate since 1826 and continued as rector until his death in 1874. Huntington established the Sunday school, for which he laid the foundation stone in 1827. In 1906, around 250 children attended the Sunday school and the church had numerous affiliated groups, such as a Penny Bank and a Choral Society. By the early 1900s, the graveyard was overshadowed on its northern side by a warehouse built on the Quay Street site of the Byrom family residence, and with a declining congregation and some redundancy of provision given the nearby St Matthew's Church, the Manchester diocese decided to merge the parish of St John's with St Matthew's in 1927. As a result, the church was demolished in 1931.

The church has been described as the first significant building in Manchester to be constructed in the Gothic Revival style of architecture. Construction of the tower, which contained a peal of eight bells manufactured by Lester and Pack, was completed in May 1770. The first restoration took place in 1821, including a re-roofing paid for by a daughter of Byrom. Between 1874 and 1878 work was done at a cost of £1,600 and in 1898 the lighting was converted from gas to electric. The church bells, which were described as "among the best peal of bells in Manchester", were rehung in 1832 and again around 1883. The roof collapsed in 1924 and was rebuilt by 1926. Among people who were commemorated in the church windows were John Owens, and Sir Thomas Bazley.

Today the graveyard of the church is commemorated by a stone cross and a plaque states that more than 22,000 bodies lie buried in the vicinity. Among those buried in the churchyard are John Owens, the founder of Owens College, and William Marsden, who founded the concept of a half-day holiday on Saturdays.

== Origins ==
The rapid population growth of Manchester during the mid-18th century saw a rising demand for more churches. St John's Church was built in 1769 by Edward Byrom (13 June 1724 – 24 April 1773), a co-founder of the first bank in Manchester and the oldest surviving son of John Byrom, whose affluent family was well known in the area. According to William Shaw, a local historian and fellow of Owens College, the church was "intended for the 'genteel' residents who were migrating to the south side of the town".

Byrom obtained permission from Edmund Keene, the Bishop of Chester, and was supported by many prominent local people. Its parish, which was not formalised until at least 1839, encompassed an area described by the Manchester Courier in 1900 as

Between Quay-street and Brazennose-street on the north, and the Central Station and Bridgewater-street on the south. Its eastern boundary is the Town Hall (which is within the parish), Cooper-street, and Lower Mosley-street; and its western limit the River Irwell, forming the boundary of Manchester and Salford. [Thus it covered] a large and important section of the city of Manchester. (Note: Quite when St John's parish came into being is uncertain. The Parish of Manchester Division Act 1850 (13 & 14 Vict. c. 41) saw the beginning of a process that created various new parishes from the old, large Manchester parish that had the Manchester Collegiate Church at its head but some changes in ecclesiastical administration in 1839 had seen St John's among the many churches that were assigned a district within the parish for the first time. These districts were, effectively, parishes.)

J. M. W. Turner sketched the tower of St John's and two nearby church spires in 1831. The sketch is in the Tate's collection.

== Structure ==
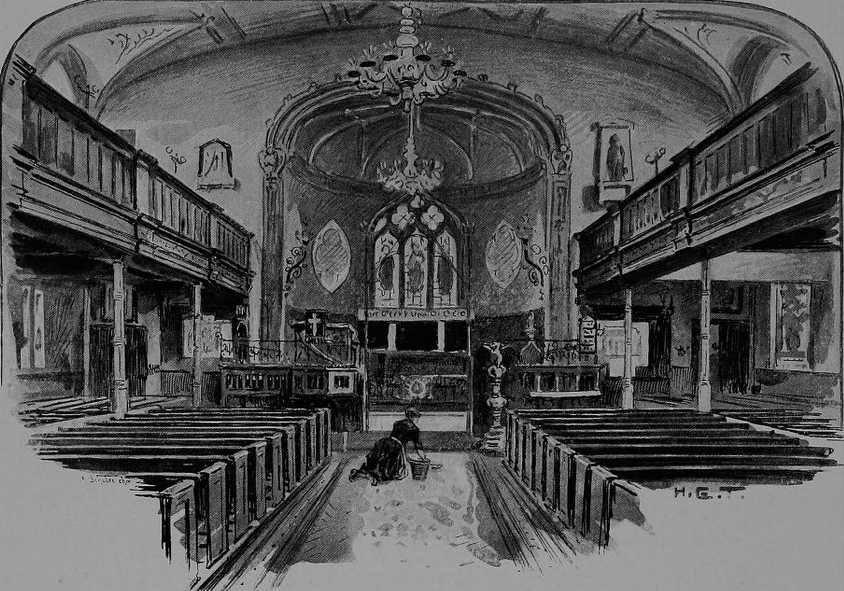
Interior of St John's Church, Manchester, circa 1894. An illustration by Henry Edward Tidmarsh (1854–1939).

Although contemporary sources such as the Manchester Mercury name Byrom as the sponsor of the building, they do not identify his architect. The church was described by the English author and historian Clare Hartwell as being the first significant building in Manchester to be constructed in the Gothic Revival style of architecture. It had galleries supported by slender cast-iron columns. The foundation stone was laid by Edward Byrom on 28 April 1768 and Keene performed the consecration on 7 July 1769, when the sermon was given by John Byrom's friend, John Clayton. Construction of the tower, which contained a peal of eight bells manufactured by Lester and Pack, was completed in May 1770.

The first restoration took place in 1821, including a re-roofing paid for by a daughter of Byrom. (Note: The direct Byrom family line came to an end in 1870 with the death of Eleanora Atherton, who founded Holy Trinity, Hulme and was an unmarried childless grand-daughter of Edward Byrom. The family name continued because Eleanora Atherton left much of her estate to a godson, Edward Fox, on condition that he change his surname to Byrom. In 1883, he donated a lectern to the church in her memory.) Between 1874 and 1878 work was done at a cost of £1600 and in 1898 the lighting was converted from gas to electric, substantial internal modifications were carried out and repairs made to the clock tower which cost around £2200. The church bells, which were described by a local journalist for the Manchester Courier and Lancashire General Advertiser as "among the best peal of bells in Manchester", were rehung in 1832 and again around 1883. The tower had clock dials on all four sides. A minute hand was added to the clock in 1833 and its mechanism was replaced around 1906. The graveyard was paved with tombstones.

In 1906, the church was looking to raise funds to acquire and convert the nearby St John's Hospital of Manchester and Salford for the Ear for use as a rectory. (Note: The proposal to acquire the Ear Hospital seems not to have come to fruition: there are records of hospital board meetings held at St John Street in 1915.)

The roof collapsed in 1924 and was rebuilt by 1926. Among people who were commemorated in the church windows were John Owens, and Sir Thomas Bazley. Another window was of some antiquity, originating from a convent in Rouen, France, and presented to the church by a grateful French refugee priest. This Entry to Jerusalem window was moved in 1929 to the Church of St Mary the Virgin, Eccles and windows depicting St John, St Peter and St Matthew, dating from 1760 by William Peckitt, were at some time moved to St Ann's Church in the city.

Other windows were by William Raphael Eginton. Circa 1816, he described these as:

Centre Compartment, St. Peter, James, and John; and in the side, our Saviour praying on the Mount, and Christ betrayed by Judas, surrounded with Gothic Canopies and Mosaics Ornaments.

== Functions ==
The church held the right to conduct the marriages of people throughout Manchester, not only from within its parish, until 1874. Despite this, there were no such services for the first 35 years of its existence, perhaps because of the continued popularity of the Collegiate Church as a venue for weddings but probably because the latter insisted on collecting its own fees for marriages held in other local churches, which effectively doubled the cost of being married at St John's rather than at the Collegiate Church. Later, after the rights of the Collegiate Church were curtailed, some weeks saw more than 100 marriage services at St John's in the years just before 1874. Burials ceased completely in 1900 but there had been very few for some years previously because the available space had been exhausted and most graves were full. (Note: Some family vaults within the church could be used but after 1900 it was necessary to obtain a Special Act of Parliament to do so.)

In 1827, the church erected a building dedicated as a Sunday school. This was also used as a day school from 1838. In 1906, around 250 children attended the Sunday school and the church had numerous affiliated groups, such as a Penny Bank and a Choral Society. The day school accommodation was at that time condemned by the Board of Education as unfit for purpose and it was operating under a stay issued by the board. In the same year, Hannah Mitchell, a suffragette, was arrested at the day school for protesting during an election campaign speech by Winston Churchill. The building was closed in 1908 and a new school building opened on Gartside Street in 1910 at a cost of £4000. This new facility was used only as Sunday school because, said the local clergy, the Board of Education put too many administrative obstacles and demands in their way, such as stipulating such a small attendance roll as to render any day school uneconomic and insisting on a dedicated playground despite there being a large open space next door that was traditionally used for that purpose. According to the foundation stone of the new school building, the church had operated the first Sunday school in Manchester, although Shaw attributes that distinction to a Mr Fildes, a Methodist whose establishment began operating from a Travis Street cellar in 1782. Shaw says that several other schools preceded that of St John's.

Around 1781, the church had been the base for one of Manchester's eight fire engines.

== Clergy ==
A condition imposed by Byrom was that he had the right to present the living. The first rector, John Clowes, held the office for 62 years until his death in 1831. He was commemorated by two stone tablets in the church, one by either Richard Westmacott or his son, erected after his death and one, the only example of the work of John Flaxman in Manchester, to celebrate his 50th anniversary as rector. Clowes preached the first Sunday school sermon in the Manchester area, introduced Swedenborgianism there and was prominent in championing Whit Walks.

Clowes was succeeded by William Huntington, who had held the post of curate since 1826 and continued as rector until his death in 1874. Huntington established the Sunday school. Huntington's successor as rector was John Henn, who held office for 14 years before moving to Heaton Chapel. The next rector, G. R. Youngman, was in office from 1888 until his death in 1890. His position was taken by E. F. Leach. The last rector was Herbert Edmonds.

William Cowherd, a Swedenborgian proponent of teetotalism and vegetarianism, was a curate in the late 1700s, before leaving to establish the Bible Christian Church in Salford.

== Demise ==
By the early 1900s, the graveyard was overshadowed on its northern side by a warehouse built on the Quay Street site of the Byrom family residence. (Note: The large detached house on Quay Street remained in the family until 1870 and was then occupied for some time by a doctor. Leo Grindon said that Byrom arranged for the meadow in front of it, which was used by his children as a playground, to be made preserved as such in perpetuity.) The area had been residential—Richard Cobden was among those who lived nearby and attended the church—but changed in character during the 19th century, as many homes once occupied by affluent families became lodging houses and the locale became increasingly a place of business. Those who did live there, or were patients in the nearby hospitals, were poor and unable to contribute significantly to the funds of the church and its schools. Fundraising bazaars were held in the 1890s and 1900s at the Free Trade Hall, in a nearby area that was more salubrious.

Falling attendances due to the commercial nature of the district, and also a sense that there was some redundancy of provision given the nearby St Matthew's Church, caused the Manchester diocese to review the status of St John's and its parish in the 1920s. Following an internal review and a public consultation, in 1927 it was formally proposed that the two parishes should be merged as St Matthew's parish. The diocese preferred to retain St Matthew's and demolish St John's, at least in part because the former was a more recent construction. This was a reversal of a proposal made in 1919, when the predominantly transient Roman Catholic population of the St Matthew's parish was given as a reason to merge it into St John's.

The Ecclesiastical Commissioners proposed to hand over the church site to Manchester Corporation in 1929, with the hope that the city would convert it into an open space similar to Parsonage Gardens. The Manchester Guardian had reported a similar proposal to convert the "bleak expanse" of the graveyard into an "open, cultivated space" in 1914.

The church was demolished in 1931. It is commemorated by a stone cross and a plaque states that more than 22,000 bodies lie buried in the vicinity. Among those buried in the churchyard are John Owens, founder of Owens College, the forerunner of Manchester University and William Marsden, who pioneered the concept of a half-day holiday on Saturdays.

== See also ==
- List of churches in Greater Manchester
