= Kersal =

Suburb of Salford, Greater Manchester, England

Coordinates: 53.510062°N 2.278237°W

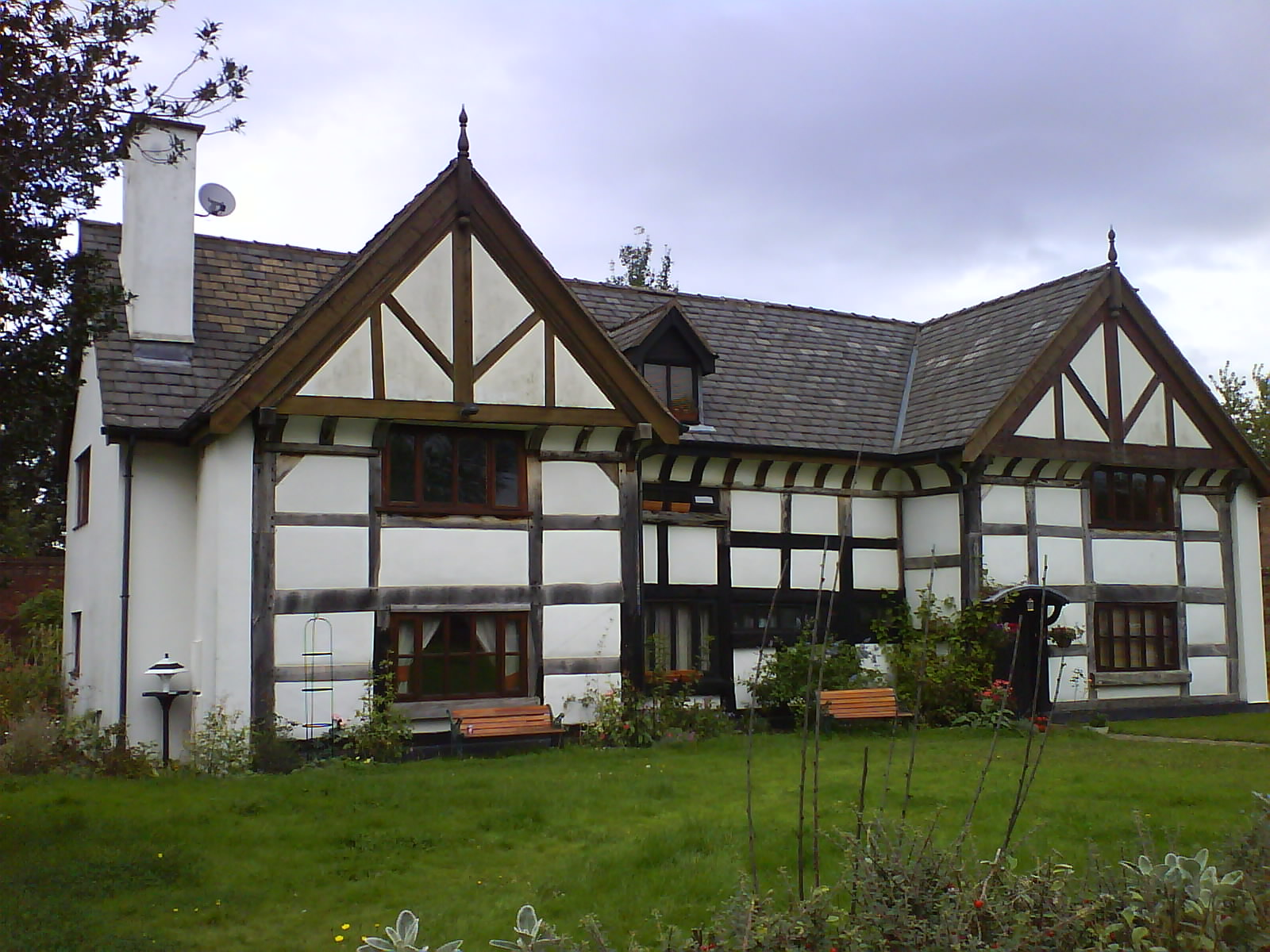
- Kersal Cell, built in 1563

- Location within Greater Manchester
- Population: 12,929 (Ward profile conducted by Salford City Council in 2014)
- OS grid reference: SD815015
- Metropolitan borough: City of Salford
- Metropolitan county: Greater Manchester
- Region: North West
- Country: England
- Sovereign state: United Kingdom
- Post town: SALFORD
- Postcode district: M7
- Dialling code: 0161
- Police: Greater Manchester
- Fire: Greater Manchester
- Ambulance: North West
- UK Parliament: Bury South
- Councillors: Ari Leitner (Conservative); Arnold Saunders (Conservative); Peter Connor (Labour)

Kersal is a district of Salford, Greater Manchester, England, 3 miles (4.8 km) northwest of Manchester city centre.

== History ==
Kersal has been variously known as Kereshale, Kershal, Kereshole, Carshall and Kersall.

The name incorporates the Old English word halh, meaning "a piece of flat alluvial land by the side of a river". "Kersal" indicates that this was land where cress grew.

In 1142, Kereshale was given to the Priory of Lenton, an order of Cluniac monks, who established an early cell there named St Leonard's. On the Dissolution of the Monasteries in 1540 Henry VIII sold the priory and its lands to one Baldwin Willoughby. It was sold eight years later to Ralph Kenyon, who was acting on behalf of himself, James Chetham of Crumpsall and Richard Siddall of Withington. The Kenyon third was sold about the year 1660 to the Byroms of Manchester, whose line terminated on the death of Eleanora Atherton in 1870. All the land eventually descended to, or was bought by, the Clowes family (the Lords of the Manor of Broughton) who began to sell off the land for development in the 19th and early 20th centuries. The most famous resident of Kersal Cell was John Byrom (1692–1763). It is said that he wrote the hymn Christians Awake there, but it is more likely that it was written at his home in the Old Shambles in Manchester above what is now the Wellington Inn. After John and his wife's death Kersal Cell was left to his daughter the enthusiastic Jacobite Elizabeth Byrom. Her diary of her time with Bonnie Prince Charlie was discovered in the house.

In the 17th century, the Kersal Moor races were the great event of the year. They usually took place around Whit Week when large numbers of people turned the area into a giant fairground for several days. The moor was also used for nude male races, allowing females to study the form before choosing their mates. Indeed, in the 18th century, Roger Aytoun, known as "Spanking Roger", later a hero of the Siege of Gibraltar, acquired Hough Hall in Moston, through marriage after such a race. Kersal Moor was also host to one of the great political events of the 19th century, when it was the meeting place for the largest of the Chartist Assemblies attended by at least 30,000 people in September 1838 and again in May 1839. It was also the site of one of the first golf courses to be built outside Scotland. Kersal Links opened in 1818, and was the oldest golf course between the Thames and the Tweed until it closed in 1960. The Kersal Moor races began prior to 1680 and continued, with various interruptions, until 1847 when the course was switched to the other side of the River Irwell, to Castle Irwell, where it remained until 1963. In 1961 the Members' Stand at the Castle Irwell Racecourse was opened and contained the world's first executive boxes. The architect for the racecourse, Ernest Atherden, showed this to the directors of Manchester United who opened their first executive box in 1965, and hence began the modern corporatisation of sport.

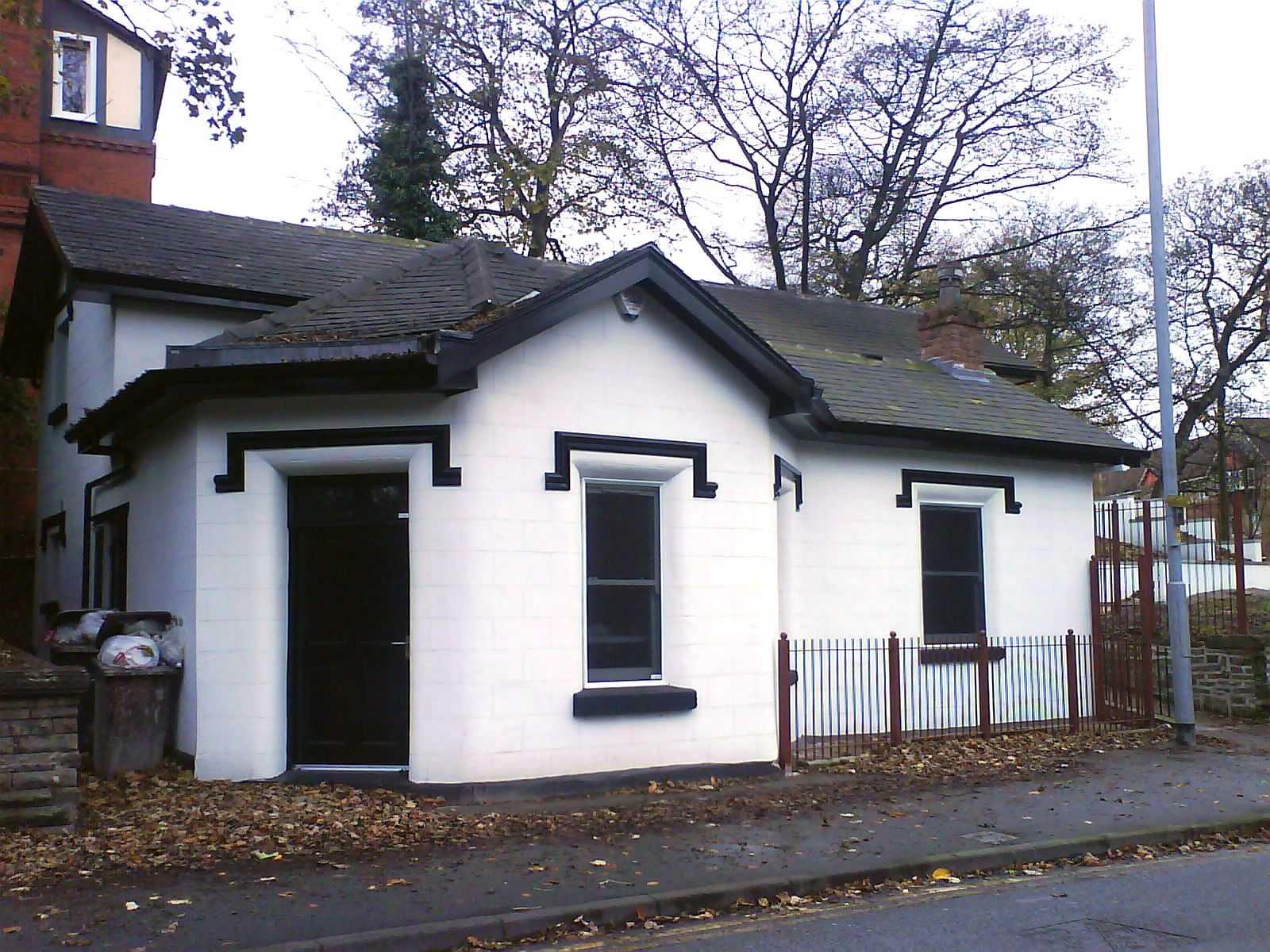
Former Kersal Bar Toll House

Kersal remained a rural area until about 1840 when the Clowes family, who owned most of the land in the area, began to sell it off for development, and merchants and manufacturers began to build their mansions in the green fields of Higher Broughton and Kersal. In keeping with their own ideas of social engineering they imposed strict covenants on how the land was used, reserving the higher ground for more well-to-do residents and the lower ground for workers' cottages. The number of public houses was severely restricted and then, only beer houses that didn't sell spirits were allowed. Singleton Road and Moor Lane were the only roads connecting Bury Old Road and Bolton Road and there was a toll bar on the corner of Bury Old Road. When Bury New Road was built in 1831 a gate or bar was erected and travellers had to pay a toll to the turnpike trust to pass through. A toll house was erected on Bury New Road with a bay window projecting out so that the toll collector had a clear view of the road. By 1848 the local authority had taken over the road, the tolls were abolished and the toll collector's house became a newsagent's. This was the only shop in an area where the landowner's restrictive covenants prevented commercial development. The exterior of the house remains largely unchanged to this day, although it was renovated in 2007 with a two-storey extension being added to the rear. The Toll House is now a Grade II listed building.

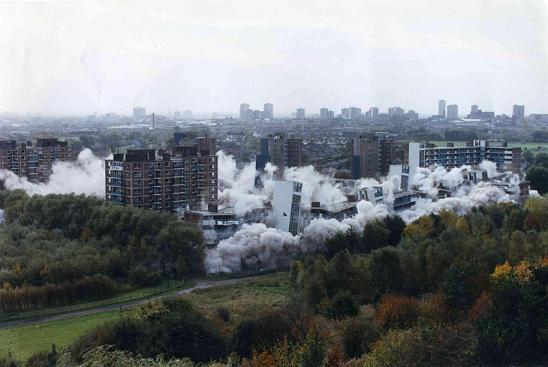
Demolition of the Kersal flats in 1990

In the 1930s a large council housing estate was built to the east of Littleton Road. Twelve high-rise tower blocks, known as Kersal flats, were constructed for Salford Council in the 1960s. Eight of these were demolished in 1990. The other blocks were sold to private developers to renovate for private sale. The Housing Act 1980 gave tenants the right to buy. Since then much of the council estate has been sold to sitting tenants and by 2011 just over 50% of homes in the Kersal Ward were in owner-occupation.

== Governance ==
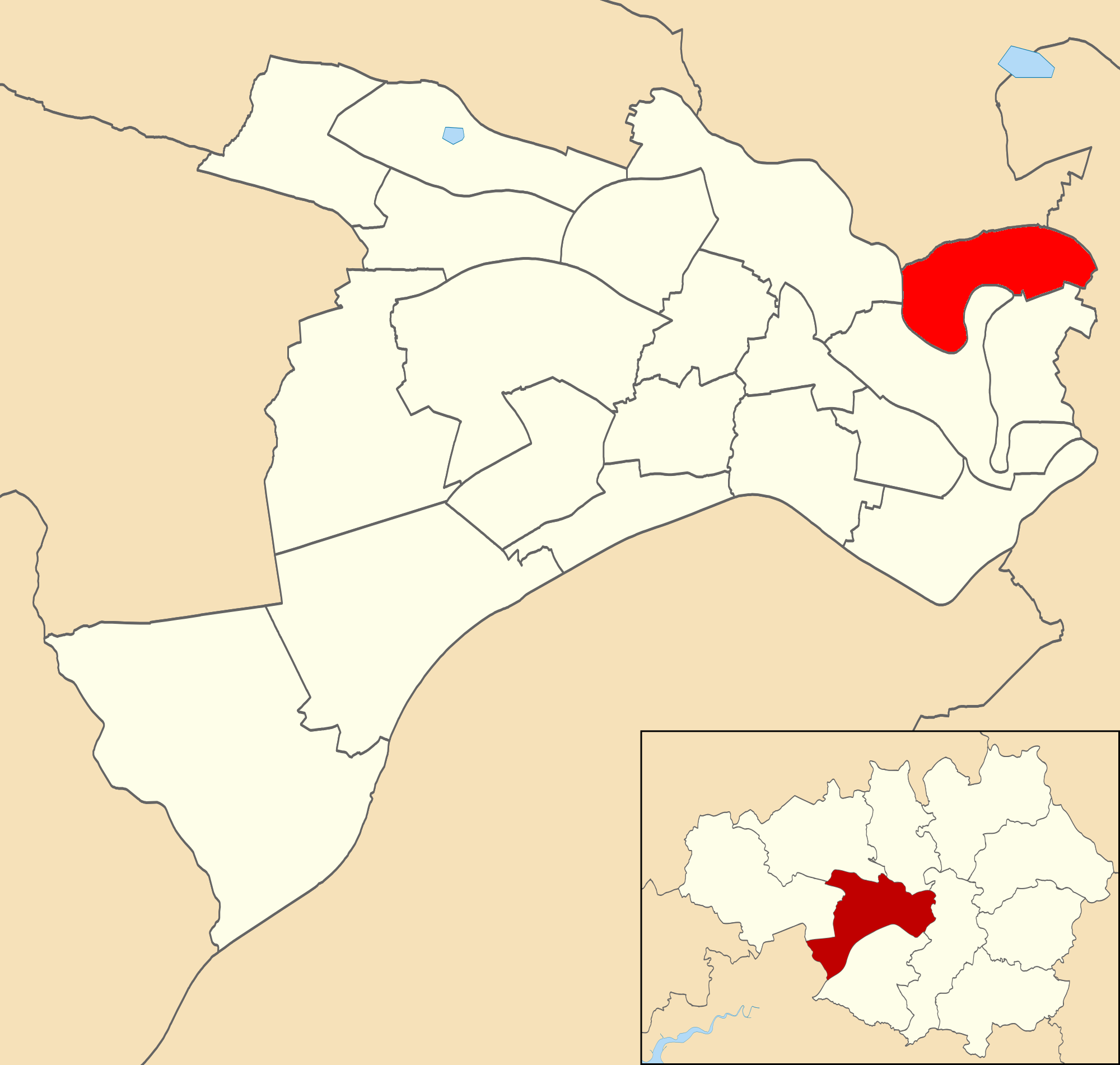
Kersal electoral ward within Salford City Council.

Kersal was originally a hamlet in the township of Broughton. In 1853 the township amalgamated with Salford despite opposition from some of its more wealthy residents, who did not wish to "assimilate the cotton of Manchester or the filth of Salford". Kersal & Broughton Park ward (simply Kersal until 2021) is one of twenty, each represented by three councillors, which make up the City of Salford.

Councillors

The ward is represented by three councillors: Ari Leitner (Con), Arnold Saunders (Con) and Andrew Walters (Independent).

Election	Councillor	Councillor	Councillor
2004	Ann-Marie Humphreys (Lab)	George Wilson (Lab)	Peter Connor (Lab)
2006	Ann-Marie Humphreys (Lab)	George Wilson (Lab)	Peter Connor (Lab)
2007	Ann-Marie Humphreys (Lab)	George Wilson (Lab)	Peter Connor (Lab)
2008	Ann-Marie Humphreys (Lab)	George Wilson (Lab)	Peter Connor (Lab)
2010	Ann-Marie Humphreys (Lab)	George Wilson (Lab)	Peter Connor (Lab)
2011	Ann-Marie Humphreys (Lab)	George Wilson (Lab)	Peter Connor (Lab)
2012	Ann-Marie Humphreys (Lab)	George Wilson (Lab)	Peter Connor (Lab)
2014	Ann-Marie Humphreys (Lab)	George Wilson (Lab)	Peter Connor (Lab)
2015	Ann-Marie Humphreys (Lab)	Harry Davies (Lab)	Peter Connor (Lab)
2016	Ann-Marie Humphreys (Lab)	Harry Davies (Lab)	Peter Connor (Lab)
By-election; 2 March 2017	Ann-Marie Humphreys (Lab)	Arnold Saunders (Con)	Peter Connor (Lab)
2018	Ari Leitner (Con)	Arnold Saunders (Con)	Peter Connor (Lab)
2019	Ari Leitner (Con)	Arnie Saunders (Con)	Peter Connor (Lab)
2021	Ari Leitner (Con)	Arnie Saunders (Con)	Andrew Walters (Ind)

indicates seat up for re-election. indicates seat won in by-election.

== Geography ==
Kersal is bounded on the north by Singleton Brook, which defines the border with Prestwich, on the south and west by the River Irwell and on the east by Broughton, although the exact position of the border with Broughton is difficult to determine. The west and south of the district lie in the flood-plain of the River Irwell, and consequently have historically been subject to flooding. Serious floods were documented in 1866, 1946, 1954 and 1980. The River Irwell Flood Defence Scheme, officially opened in 2005, uses levees and the playing fields alongside the river as an emergency water catchment area to alleviate this problem.

The land in the north east rises steeply before flattening out into a series of rolling hills. At one time it was a pastoral area (said to be of 100 acres (0.4 km^{2})) known as Kersal Woods or Kersal Moor. Much of it has now been developed for residential purposes or as a football ground, and the open land known today as Kersal Moor comprises an area of only 12 acres (0.05 km^{2}).

== Demography ==
A profile of the ward conducted by Salford City Council in 2014 recorded a population of 12,929 with 86.8% of people describing themselves as white, 2.3% African, 1.4% Pakistani and 2.7% as other ethnic group.

The 2011 UK Census recorded that the religious mix is mainly Christian and Jewish with 34.3% of the population describing themselves as Christian and 40.96% as Jewish. 3.30% describe themselves as Muslim with none of the other faiths exceeding 0.5%.

== Religion ==
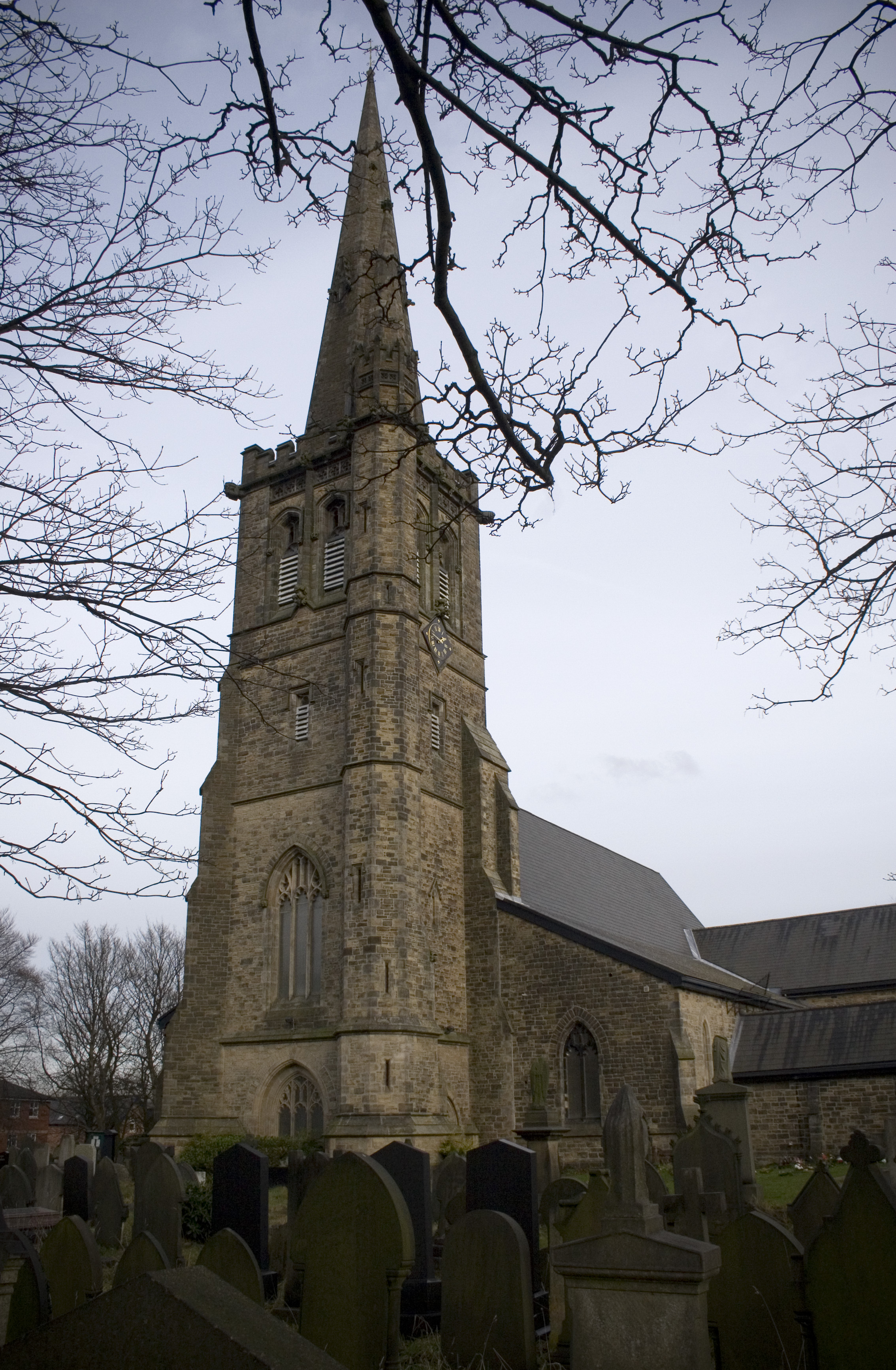
St Paul's Church, Moor Lane

Churches in Kersal include the Anglican St Paul's Church on Moor Lane, built at the instigation of Colonel William Legh Clowes and Eleanora Atherton of Kersal Cell "for the benefit of the poor of Rainscow" (Rainsough — a hamlet just across the border in Prestwich) in 1851–1852.

The only church in Lower Kersal is the Anglican St Aidan's on Littleton Road, a brick-built church opened in 1972 which seats about 120 people.

There is also the Roman Catholic church Our Lady of Dolours, on Bury New Road served by Servite Friars and known locally as "the Servites". The building adjacent to the church at number 500 Bury New Road, now used as the Servite Priory for the church, was originally the Greek Consulate and still has many Greek motifs adorning its internal decor.

The former Catholic Chaplaincy at St Philip's Church on Northallerton Road, Lower Kersal, is now home to the "Just Youth" ministry of the Holy Ghost Fathers.

There are convents of the Roman Catholic Sisters of the Cross and Passion on Bury New Road and Faithful Companions of Jesus on Singleton Road, and there was also a closed order of nuns at a Carmelite Convent on Vine Street for many years.

Synagogues in Kersal include the Spanish and Portuguese Synagogue (Shaare Tephillah), founded in 1873, and North Salford Synagogue. Greater Manchester has the largest Jewish community in the United Kingdom outside London and Kersal, along with Higher Broughton, Prestwich, and Whitefield, is home to most of the Orthodox Jewish community.

== Education ==
There are three schools serving the area, St Philip's Roman Catholic Primary School on Cavendish Road, Lower Kersal Community Primary School on St Aidan's Grove, off Littleton Road and St Paul's Church of England Primary School on Nevile Road which replaced a school of the same name built in the 19th century on Kersal Moor and demolished in the 20th century. There was also a high school off Moor Lane on Mesnefield Road, Kersal High School, which was replaced in 2003 with the Albion High School, based on Lissadel Street, Charlestown. Kersal High School was demolished in 2006 and its site used for housing.

== Health ==
The mortality rate in Lower Kersal and Charlestown is more than twice the national average and approximately one third of the population has a chronic illness. Although 52 General Practitioners serve the area, only three are located within it and there is just one pharmacy and one part-time dentist. New Deal for Communities (NDC) was a programme that was part of the Government strategy to regenerate deprived neighbourhoods in England. The two neighbourhoods covered by the Salford NDC were Charlestown and Lower Kersal. A grant of £53m was awarded to the area and a 10-year plan developed. It focused on health, crime, education and employment, young people, building communities and the physical environment. Plans for new health services in Kersal, including two GP practices, a pharmacy, a healthy living project, children and young people's health services and community health services, were implemented with the opening of the Horizon Centre, part of the Willow Tree Healthy Living Centre, at 94 Littleton Road in 2007.

== Sports ==
Salford City Football Club ("The Ammies") is based at the Moor Lane ground in Kersal. The club, founded in 1940, moved into this historic ground in 1978, a location with a sporting legacy which includes horse racing, golf, cricket, rugby union, rugby league, tennis and archery, going back as far as 1681.

Horse racing moved from Kersal Moor to a new racecourse at Castle Irwell, just across the River Irwell from Kersal, in 1847. In 1867 it was moved to New Barnes, Weaste but the site had to be vacated in 1901 when Salford Docks expanded and built its Dock 9. Castle Irwell later staged a Classic – the 1941 St Leger Stakes, and was most famous as home of the Lancashire Oaks (nowadays run at Haydock Park Racecourse) and the November Handicap, which was traditionally the last major race of the British flat season. Both the Castle Irwell and New Barnes sites were named the "Manchester Racecourse" even though they were entirely within the borders of Salford. Through the late 1950s and early 1960s the track saw jockeys such as Scobie Breasley and Lester Piggott annually battle out the closing acts of the jockey's title until racing ceased on 7 November 1963. The intention was to sell the land, apart from 4.5 acres (18,000 m^{2}), to a property development company. Both the City Council and the Royal Technical College objected and their objections were upheld at a Public Enquiry two years later. The main stand at Castle Irwell was designed by local architect Ernst Atherton and was the first stand at any sports venue in the UK to include private boxes, the idea having later been copied by Manchester United and then made commonplace throughout the country. The structure still survives as a students' union building; and in the early 1970s the majority of the site was used to build a student village for the University of Salford, the first student houses opening in October 1972.

Kersal's long association with sport continues with the building of Salford Sports Village, a major sports facility centred on Littleton Road which opened in March 2006. This facility is a £4.7m flagship project for the Charlestown and Lower Kersal New Deal for Communities Partnership, Salford Community Leisure and Manchester Football Association. The football facilities include mini, junior and adult grass pitches, a third generation artificial floodlit pitch, a 60-metre x 40 metre artificial pitch, 18 adult grass pitches and players and officials changing rooms. There is also a community suite with a meeting room/social facility with catering facilities, office accommodation training room and an ICT suite.

The Riverbank Park, a neighbourhood park and children's play area, opened next to the Sports Village in 2007.

== Community facilities ==
Kersal Dale Country Park occupies about 32 hectares of countryside straddling a large meander of the River Irwell to the east of Kersal. Approximately half of the park is beech woodland on the side of the Irwell Valley and half is flat land on the flood-plain of the river, which occupies part of the area formerly taken up by the Irwell Castle Racecourse and Kersal Links golf course. The park is designated as a Local Nature Reserve. The Salford Ranger Team organise environmental walks and talks, educational programmes for schools and other activities. There is also a permanent orienteering course.

Kersal Moor is an eight hectare recreation ground to the north of Kersal designated as a Site of Biological Importance and a Local Nature Reserve which consists of open moorland popular with dog walkers and schools.

Lower Kersal Activities Centre, Northallerton Road, Lower Kersal runs a variety of community activities for different age groups, including holiday play schemes. Salford College also runs community courses for over 16s at the centre.

Lower Kersal Social Club, Stamford Road, is a sports and social club open to the public. The club consists of two rooms – the vault area with TV's, 4 darts boards, 1 snooker table and 1 pool table.

The Community Groups' Network gives local community groups, residents' groups and volunteers in Charlestown and Lower Kersal the chance to meet and share information.

Lower Kersal Young People's Group is a Greater Manchester youth network.

The Y-Talk Website has been designed with, and for, young people in Charlestown and Kersal. The site is produced and managed by Salford Youth Service.

== Industry ==
A soap factory was established in Kersal Vale, by the side of the River Irwell on the border with Prestwich in 1920 by Alexander Tom Cussons. The factory produced the famous brands of Carex, Cussons Imperial Leather and Morning Fresh but was closed down in 2009 and was demolished in 2010.

== Plans ==
The Charlestown and Lower Kersal New Deal for Communities has made many improvements to the area including the sports village and improvements to housing and the local environment. There is much work yet to be done, including the demolition of old housing stock to make way for new development. The New Deal Team is working closely with Salford City Council, partner agencies and a network of well-established community groups with their stated aim being to "make sure that the area can become a prosperous and thriving part of Salford." The plans have not been universally welcomed and action groups have been formed to protest at the perceived lack of consultation and the threat to existing homes.

== Notable residents ==
- Eleanora Atherton, philanthropist
- John Byrom (1692–1763), poet and inventor of a revolutionary system of shorthand.
- Edward Schunck (1829–1903), organic chemist
- Annie Swynnerton (1844–1933), artist
- Hewlett Johnson (1874–1966), cleric later known as the Red Dean of Canterbury, born here.
- Ginger Joe, C-MAC and Little Kev of Notable Rap Group 'The Kersal Massive'

== See also ==
- Listed buildings in Salford, Greater Manchester
