= Holy Trinity, Hulme =

Former church in Manchester, England

Coordinates: 53.4667°N 2.2470°W

Holy Trinity was an Anglican parish church built in Hulme, Manchester in 1841 to a design by George Gilbert Scott and S. Moffat. Construction cost around £18,000 and was funded by Eleanora Atherton, the granddaughter of Edward Byrom, who had himself founded St John's Church, Manchester. The church was on Stretford Road, to the east of Hulme town hall.

The hammer-beam roof was decorated with plaster angels painted to resemble wood. The church was considered a good composition by The Builder. Scott used the same design for six other churches. Partially damaged by bombing in World War II, it was demolished in 1953.

== See also ==
- List of churches in Greater Manchester

== Bibliography ==
- Shaw, William Arthur (1894), Manchester Old and New, vol. II, Cassell
