= John Clowes (priest) =

The Reverend John Clowes
- Born: 20 October 1743; Manchester, Lancashire
- Died: 29 May 1831 (aged 87); Leamington, Warwickshire
- Education: Trinity College, Cambridge: (BA; MA)
- Occupations: Cleric; Theologian

Ecclesiastical career
- Religion: Christianity (Anglican)
- Church: Church of England
- Ordained: 1768 (priest)
- Offices held: Rector, St John's Church, Manchester (1769–1831)

John Clowes (20 October 1743 – 29 May 1831) was an English cleric and Fellow of Trinity College, Cambridge. Despite his position in the Anglican church, for which he served as Rector of St John's Church, Manchester from 1769 until 1831, he was a noted disciple of Emanuel Swedenborg and did much to propagate his ideas in the Manchester area.

== Early life ==
John Clowes was born in Manchester on 20 October 1743 and baptised on 17 November of that year at St Ann's Church in the town. He was the fourth son of a barrister, Joseph Clowes (1700–79), and Catherine née Edwards (1712–52), who father may have been curate at Llanbedr in North Wales. Although his mother died when he was less than ten years old, it was she who encouraged an understanding of religion and that encouragement was continued by his father after her death.

Clowes was educated at an academy run by John Clayton in Salford and may also have gone to a grammar school in the same area. He was admitted to Trinity College, Cambridge, in 1761 and graduated with a B.A. degree in 1766, having been taught by Richard Watson, who later became bishop of Llandaff.

== Career ==
The young Clowes suffered from poor health and uncertainty about his future career. He had intended to become a lawyer like his father but changed his mind and in 1767 was ordained by Richard Terrick. He had commenced teaching as a private tutor on going down from Trinity but had to abandon that in 1769 because of his health. In that year he proceeded to the degree of M.A. and was elected to a fellowship at the college. He had turned down the offer of the living of St John's Church, Manchester which had been made to him by his relative Edward Byrom, who was also founder of the church. However, on 13 August 1769 he accepted the position and remained there until his death despite being offered a bishopric by William Pitt the Younger in 1804.

Clowes had had some doubts regarding his vocation and had been reading the works of various thinkers, such as William Law, when in 1773 he was introduced to the thoughts of Swedenborg and to the efforts of Thomas Hartley, the first translator of Swedenborg's works into the English language. From then on, and despite doubts regarding whether he could remain an Anglican cleric whilst doing so, Clowes followed the Swedenborgian path. He preached that doctrine in his church and also in twice-weekly meetings, as well as in field-meetings addressing the factory workers of nearby towns.

In 1778, Clowes established an early English Swedenborgian Society in Whitefield, near to Manchester. This was supported mainly by rich cotton manufacturers and became known as the Society of Gentlemen. Its early purpose was to counter the movement spearheaded by Robert Hindmarsh that sought to create a Swedenborgian New Jerusalem Church that was entirely separate from the Anglican Church. Clowes was vehemently and very vocally opposed to any split. (Note: Jon Mee says the Society of Gentlemen was established in 1782.) Known as the Manchester Printing Society from 1801, it also disseminated the works and ideas of Swedenborg.

Despite being involved in many controversies relating to his beliefs, including disputes with other Anglican clergymen and a referral to his bishop, Clowes was able to retain his position as rector of St John's and was appointed chaplain to the Manchester Volunteers. His 50th anniversary at the church was marked with a portrait painted by John Allen and by the installation there of a bas-relief sculpture by John Flaxman, who was both a friend and a Swedenborgian.

== Published works ==
Clowes translated five of Swedenborg's books, the first being Vera Christiana Religio in 1781. These and other writings by him, such as pamphlets and sermons, were published by the Manchester Printing Society. The society records for 1828 showed that nearly 200,000 copies had been printed. Those works included The Miracles of Jesus Christ, published by J. Gleave of Manchester in 1817, and Letters to a Friend On The Human Soul, a second edition of which was published by J. S. Hodson of London in 1846. His Religious Instruction for Youth (1812) brought together in a single volume many of his earlier publications aimed at children.

== Death ==
Clowes died on 29 May 1831 at Leamington, aged 88. He had become ill while visiting Birmingham in 1823 and was never fit enough to return to Manchester. He was buried at St John's Church on 9 June. Following his death, a stone memorial by either Richard Westmacott or his son was erected in the church.
