= Richard Wainwright =

Richard Wainwright may refer to:

== Military ==
- Richard Wainwright (American Civil War naval officer) (1817–1862), Commander in the Union Navy during the American Civil War
- Richard Wainwright (Spanish–American War naval officer) (1849–1926), Admiral in the U.S. Navy during the Spanish–American War
- Richard Wainwright (World War I naval officer) (1881–1944), Commander in the U.S. Navy, awarded Medal of Honor

== Others ==
- Richard Wainwright (composer) (1757–1825), English church organist and composer
- Richard Wainwright (politician) (1918–2003), British politician and businessman
