= Richard Wainwright (composer) =

English church organist and composer (1757–1825)

Richard Wainwright (1757 – 20 August 1825) was an English church organist and composer, son of John Wainwright. He was an organist at St Ann's in Manchester, and succeeded his brother Robert as organist at the Manchester Collegiate Church (later Manchester Cathedral) in 1775. Following Robert's death in 1782, Richard once again succeeded him, this time as organist at St Peter's in Liverpool. After spending some time in Preston and then at St James in Toxteth Park, Liverpool, Richard returned to St Peters in 1813 and remained there until his death.

He published a collection of hymns as well as several songs, the most popular of which was Life's a bumper.
