= Robert Hindmarsh =

English printer

Robert Hindmarsh (1759–1835) was an English printer and one of the original founders of Swedenborgianism.

== Life ==
He was born at Alnwick, Northumberland, on 8 November 1759. His father, James Hindmarsh, was one of John Wesley's preachers, and was trained by Wesley in 1777; Robert, however, was never a Methodist. At 14 he took an apprenticeship as a printer in London, and later opened his own print shop at 32 Clerkenwell Close.

About 1781 he met with one of Anthoinette Bourignon's works, and afterwards with those of Hans Engelbrecht; a Methodist preacher complained of his lending about works of this class. He first discovered Emanuel Swedenborg's theology when he read Heaven and Hell and Intercourse between the Soul and the Body in 1781; he was instantly converted.

In December 1783 he formed a society (originally consisting of five members) for the purpose of studying Swedenborg's works. Hindmarsh found first three other readers of Swedenborg: Peter Prow, William Bonington, and John August Tulk. They organized a public meeting of readers of Swedenborg with an advertisement in the newspaper. The meeting took place on 5 December 1783 at the "London Coffee House" on Ludgate Hill. They were joined by one other member, William Spence. They met again on 12 December and were joined by Henry Pickitt and James Glen. A group of readers of Swedenborg slowly grew.

In January 1784 they formed "The Theosophical Society", for translating, printing and distributing the writings of Swedenborg. Rooms were taken for the society in New Court, Middle Temple. Among the members were John Flaxman, William Sharp, two clergymen, and Hindmarsh's father, who left Methodism in 1785. Hindmarsh printed for this society Swedenborg's Apocalypsis Explicata (1785-1789), and in 1786 he issued his own abridgment of Bourignon's Light of the World. A proposal made on 19 April 1787 to open a place of worship was defeated by John Clowes, who came from Manchester to oppose it. However, on 31 July sixteen worshippers met at the house of Thomas Wright, a watchmaker, in the Poultry. His father James Hindmarsh was chosen by lot to administer the sacraments; ten communicated, and five, including Robert, were baptised into the ‘new church’.

On 27 January 1788 a chapel in Great Eastcheap (bearing over its entrance the words ‘Now it is allowable’) was opened with a sermon by James Hindmarsh; Robert was the church secretary. On 1 June two priests, the elder Hindmarsh and Samuel Smith, another ex-Methodist preacher, were ordained by twelve members, of whom Robert Hindmarsh was one selected by lot. In 1789 Hindmarsh was expelled (with five others) on the ground of lax views of the conjugial relation, perhaps only theoretical. He therefore vowed never again to be a member of any society; but he became sole tenant of the premises in Eastcheap, the majority seceding to Store Street, Tottenham Court Road.

Hindmarsh fell into controversy with Joseph Priestley, to whom he had lent (1791) Swedenborg's works, and attended annual conferences of believers in Swedenborg's doctrine, advocating in 1792 the autocracy of the priesthood. Hindmarsh held a conference (of seven members) in 1793, at which a hierarchy of three orders was agreed on, and Great Britain parcelled into twenty-four dioceses; but for want of funds the Eastcheap chapel was closed within the year. A few years later he got his friends to build a ‘temple’ in Cross Street, Hatton Garden. It was opened on 30 July 1797 by Joseph Proud, who had moved from Birmingham. Proud left in 1799 owing to disputes with the proprietors, and the chapel subsequently became the scene of Edward Irving's labours.

Meanwhile, Hindmarsh tried stockbroking, with only temporary success. In 1811 William Cowherd invited him to Salford to superintend a printing office for cheap editions of Swedenborg's works. He soon broke with Cowherd, but some of the hearers of Clowes and of Cowherd persuaded him to stay. He preached in Clarence Street, Manchester, from 7 July 1811, holding on Thursdays in 1812 a debating society, which he called the ‘new school of theology.’ His friends built for him (1813) a ‘New Jerusalem temple’ in Salford.

He was the founder of The New Magazine of Knowledge and the head of the Society for Promoting the Heavenly Doctrines of the New Jerusalem. At the conference held in Derby, 1818, over which Hindmarsh presided, it was resolved that he had been ‘virtually ordained by the divine auspices.’ Hindmarsh preached at Salford till 1824. After his retirement he wrote a history, from 1824 to 1834 working on the manuscript for Rise and Progress of the New Jerusalem Church in England, America and Other Parts. He passed the work on to others (including the Rev. Edward Madeley) to edit and complete. It was published in London in 1861.

== Family and death ==
He married Sarah Paramor on 7 May 1782; Sarah died on 2 March 1833. They had five children, Henry, Elizabeth, Charles, George, and Jane.

He died on 2 January 1835 in his daughter's house at Gravesend, and was buried at Milton-next-Gravesend.
