= Thomas Percival (disambiguation) =

Thomas Percival (1740–1804) was an English physician, health reformer, ethicist, and author

Thomas Percival may also refer to:

- Thomas Percival (actor), English stage actor of the seventeenth century
- Thomas Percival (antiquarian) (1719–1762), English antiquary
