= John Clayton (divine) =

English clergyman, Methodist and Jacobite supporter

John Clayton (1709 – 25 September 1773) was an English clergyman, an early Methodist, and Jacobite supporter.

== Life ==
He was the son of William Clayton, a bookseller from Manchester, and was born on 9 October 1709. He was educated at Manchester Grammar School and gained the school exhibition to Brasenose College, Oxford, in 1725. In 1729 the Hulmean scholarship was awarded to him, and a little later he became a college tutor. He proceeded B.A. on 16 April 1729, and M.A. on 8 June 1732.

One of his early friends was John Byrom, his fellow-townsman. At Oxford he knew John and Charles Wesley, James Hervey, Benjamin Ingham, and other pious young collegians, who formed the little society of 'Oxford Methodists'. Fasting, almsgiving, and the visitation of the sick were among the main objects of the friends, and the influence of Clayton's devotional spirit and earnest churchmanship was felt in the little community.

He left Oxford in 1732, and was ordained deacon at Chester on 29 December of that year. His first cure was that of Sacred Trinity Chapel in Salford. His house became the resort of John Wesley and others of the Oxford society whenever they came to Manchester, and Wesley on several occasions preached from his pulpit. George Whitefield also delivered one of his stirring addresses in Clayton's chapel. When Wesley was contemplating his mission to Georgia, he visited Manchester to take the opinions of Clayton and Byrom.

Clayton acted as chaplain to Darcy Lever, LL.D., high sheriff of Lancashire in 1736. He published the assize sermon which he preached at Lancaster in that year. On 6 March 1740 he was elected one of the chaplains of the Manchester Collegiate Church, and twenty years later (28 June 1760) was appointed a fellow there.

His high-church practices and strongly pronounced Jacobite views proved very obnoxious to the Whig party of the neighbourhood. He was attacked in a pamphlet by Thomas Percival of Royton, and subsequently by Josiah Owen, presbyterian minister of Rochdale, and John Collier, otherwise known as 'Tim Bobbin'. When the Young Pretender visited Manchester in 1745, Clayton publicly advocated his claims, and offered up prayer in the collegiate church for the deposed royal family. Afterwards Clayton had to suffer: he was obliged to conceal himself, and was suspended from his office for violating his ordination vow, and for acting as one disaffected towards the Protestant succession. He was reinstated when a general amnesty towards the adherents of the Prince was proclaimed.

In Chetham's Hospital and Library at Manchester he took considerable interest, and in 1764 was elected a feoffee of that foundation. Clayton died on 25 September 1773, aged 64, and was interred in the Derby chapel of the Manchester Collegiate Church (now cathedral).

== Family ==
He married Mary Dawson of Manchester. She appears to have died young.

== Legacy ==
For many years Clayton ran an academy at Salford. After his death, his pupils formed a society called the Cyprianites, and at their first meeting decided to erect a monument to his memory in Manchester Cathedral. For school use he published in 1754 Anacreontis et Sapphonis Carmina, cum virorum doctorum notis et emendationibus. A library of 6000 books, collected by Clayton, was attached to this school: it was dispersed in 1773.

In 1755 he published a short volume entitled Friendly Advice to the Poor; written and published at the request of the late and present Officers of the Town of Manchester, in which he wrote about the poorer inhabitants of the town. It was replied to in the following year in a jocular and sarcastic manner in A Sequel to the Friendly Advice to the Poor of Manchester. By Joseph Stot, Cobbler. The real author was Robert Whitworth, printer and bookseller.
