= Elizabeth Byrom =

British Jacobite sympathizer and diarist

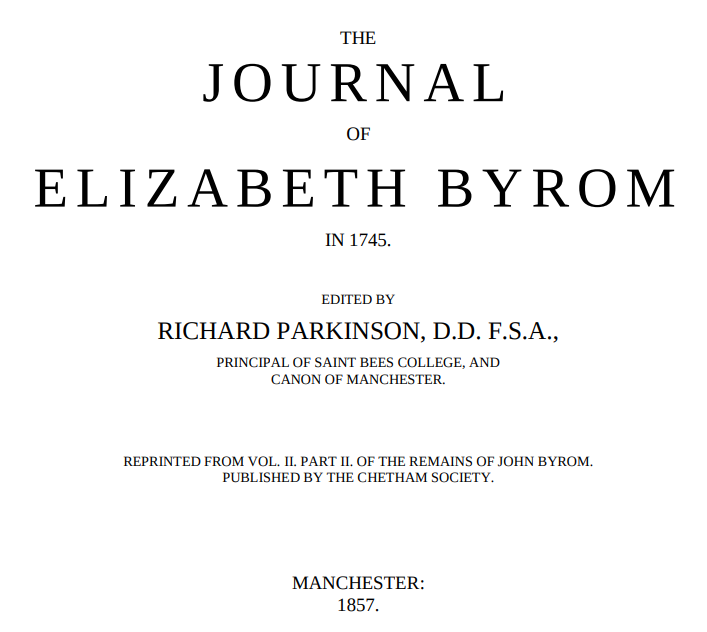
- Byrom's 1745 diary published and edited by Richard Parkinson
- Born: 1 January 1722
- Died: 2 December 1801 (aged 79)
- Known for: her diary

Elizabeth Byrom known as Beppy Byrom (1 January 1722 – 1801) was a British Jacobite sympathizer and diarist. Her family were strong supporters of the Jacobites and she is remembered for her diary of 1745 which was published in 1857.

== Life ==
Byrom was born on the first day of 1722 and she was baptised at Manchester's collegiate church (this later became Manchester Cathedral). She was her parents' first of their four children and she was named Elizabeth (the same as her mother). Her father was John Byrom who was a poet known for his creation of a (now superseded) form of shorthand. Her only brother was Edward Byrom.

Her education was paid for with a bequest from her grandfather and she also received a bequest from her uncle.

She came to notice because she started a diary on 14 August 1745 which contained some mundane chores but importantly it recorded her enthusiasm for Bonnie Prince Charlie. He had landed in Scotland on 23 July. On 28 November, "Charlie" and his Jacobite followers arrived in Manchester. They stored their artillery on her uncle Edward Byrom's land. (This land is now Byrom Street & Artillery Street) Her diary records that she ordered a blue and white gown because they were the Jacobite colours and she also purchased a pair of brightly coloured garters which had a supportive motto on them. On 30 November she was thrilled to meet Bonnie Prince Charlie at Salford Bridge and kiss his hand.

Her support for the Jacobite cause remained when the Jacobite army decided to retreat at Derby on 6 December. She and her sister raised funds and visited eighteen highlanders who were held in Manchester. She was still supporting "Charles III" when the Jacobites declared him King in 1768. Later she bought a teapot decorated with the white Stuart Rose and "C.R. III".

== Death and legacy ==
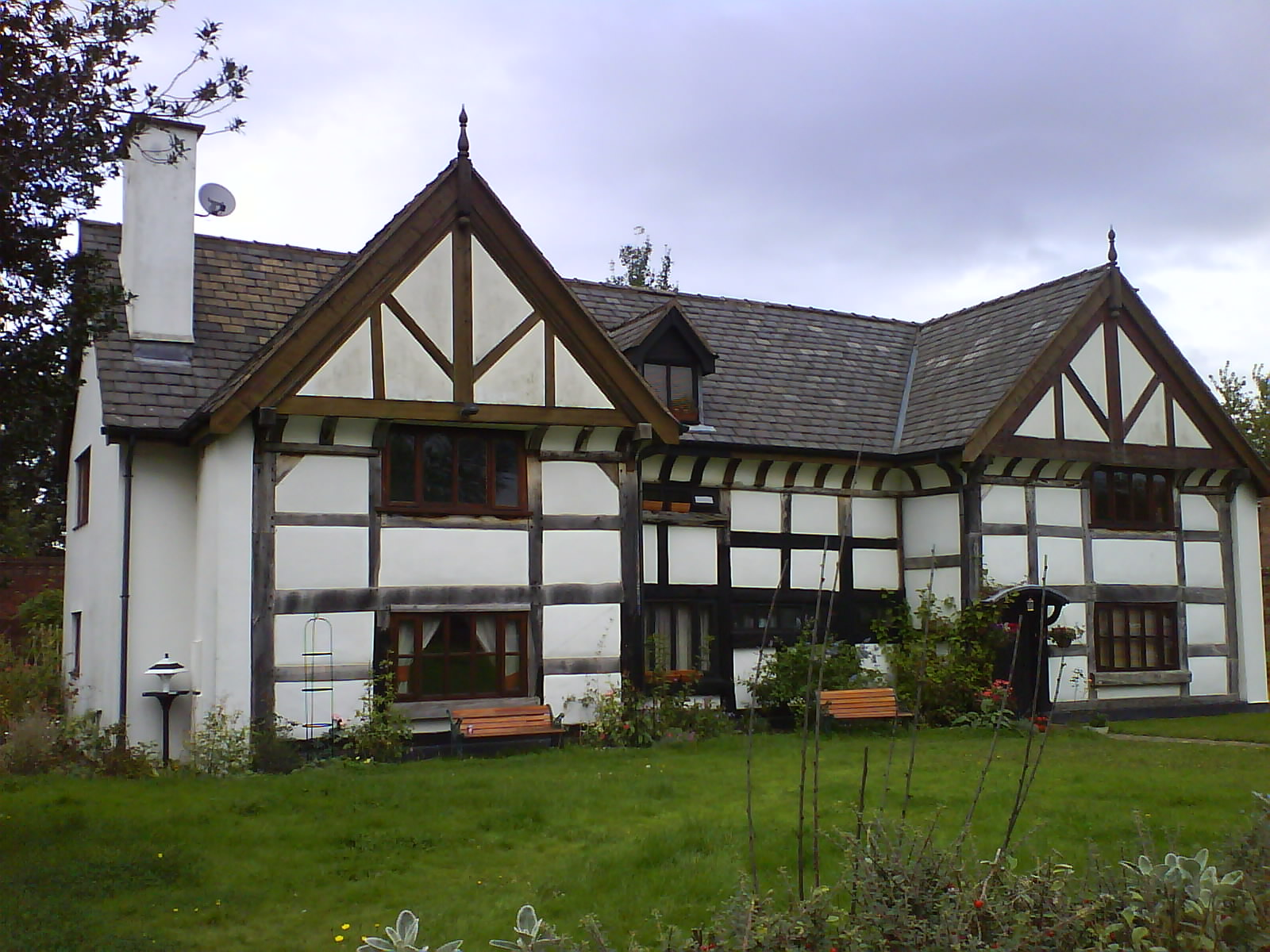
Her final home was Kersal Cell

She became the owner of Kersal Cell where she died on 2 December 1801. The manuscript of her 1745 diary was later found in that building. In 1857 Richard Parkinson published her diary adding his own annotations.
