= St Matthew's Church, Manchester =

Anglican church in Manchester, England

St Matthew's Church, Campfield, was an Anglican parish church in Manchester, England, that was designed in 1822-25 by the architect Charles Barry in a Gothic style. Built on Liverpool Road, it was a Commissioners' church and was demolished in 1951–52. The associated Sunday school building survives and has been converted into offices known as Gunn House.

== History ==
Until some changes in ecclesiastical administration in 1839, St Matthew's was one of three churches that had been assigned a formal district within the parish of Manchester, which itself fell under the control of Manchester Collegiate Church. A further 23 churches had no such areas assigned to them.

A proposal had been made in 1914 to merge the parish of St Matthew's with that of the nearby St John's Church, citing the transient and largely Roman Catholic population of the St Matthew's parish as a reason. This did not happen and, instead, St John's was subsumed by St Matthew's in the 1920s. Falling attendances due to the commercial nature of the St John's parish, and also a sense that there was some redundancy of provision given the proximity of St Matthew's, caused the Manchester diocese to review the situation, which resulted in a formal proposal of merger in 1927. The relative modernity of the St Matthew's building was among the reasons that influenced the decision. St John's Church was demolished in 1931.

== See also ==
- List of churches in Greater Manchester
- List of Commissioners' churches in Northeast and Northwest England
