= William Cowherd =

Christian minister and vegetarianism activist (1763–1816)

The Reverend William Cowherd
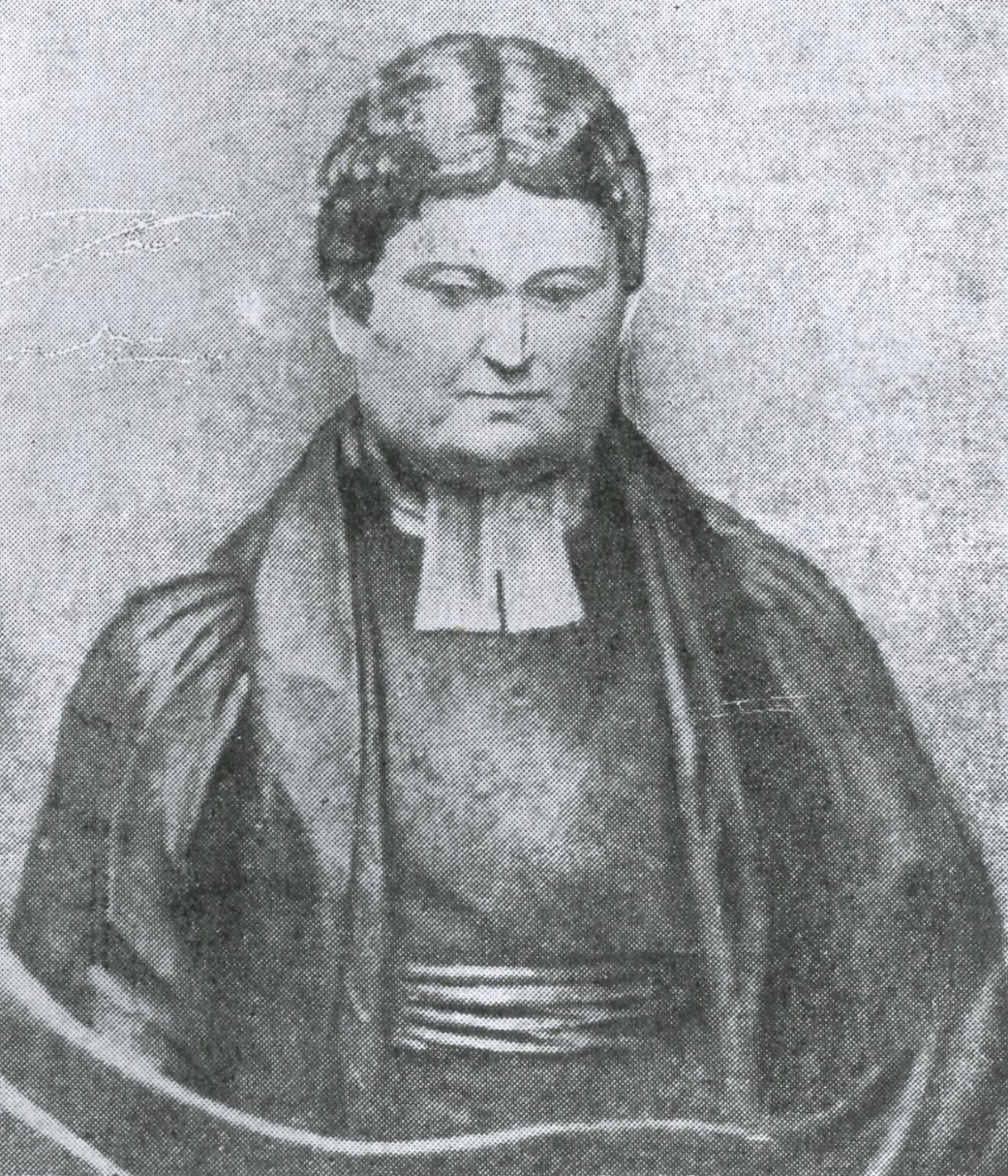
- Born: 1763; Carnforth, England
- Died: 24 March 1816 (aged 53); Salford, Lancashire, England

Ecclesiastical career
- Church: Bible Christian Church
- Congregations: Parts of Salford; Manchester city centre
- Offices held: Christian minister

William Cowherd (1763 – 24 March 1816) was an English Christian minister and vegetarianism activist. He founded the Bible Christian Church in Salford, whose members were encouraged to abstain from meat and alcoholic drink. The church was later associated with the early vegetarian movement in Britain, including the formation of the Vegetarian Society in 1847.

== Early life ==
After teaching philology at Beverley, Cowherd moved to Manchester and became curate to Rev. John Clowes at St John's Church. He studied the writings of Emanuel Swedenborg and, like Clowes, adopted Swedenborgian doctrine. He preached at the Swedenborgian church in Peter Street. According to William Axon, Cowherd was said to have been the only man to read Swedenborg's Latin writings in their entirety.

== Bible Christian Church ==
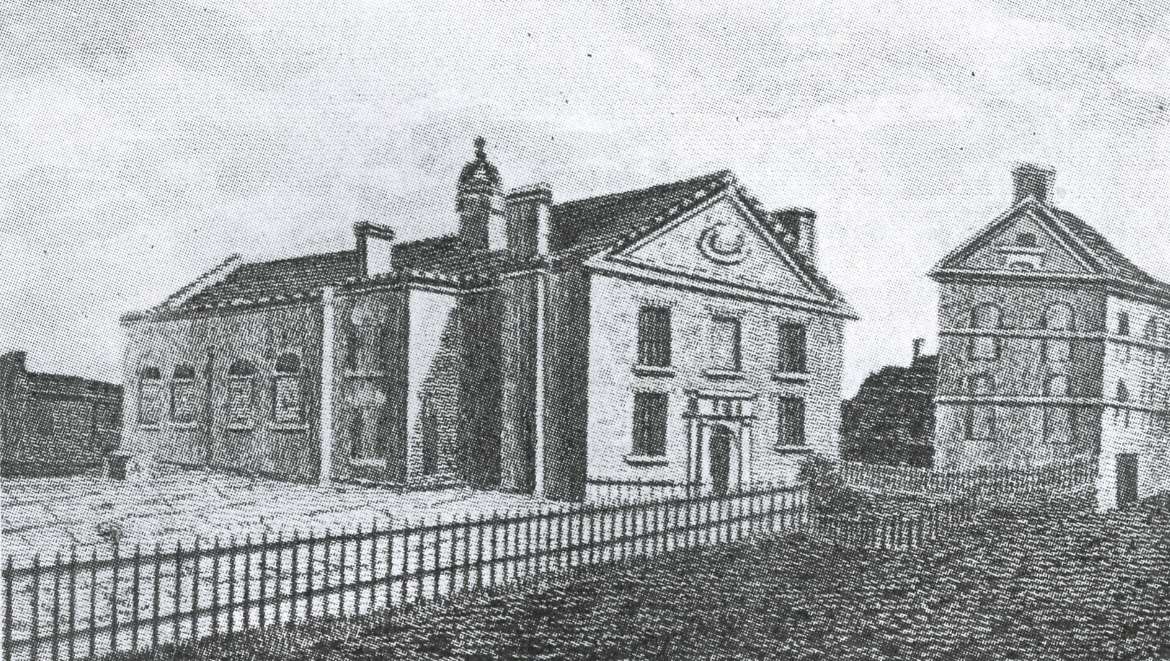
Christ Church chapel, Salford

In 1800, Cowherd established a new congregation in Salford and built a chapel at his own expense. The chapel, Christ Church, was located on King Street, Salford, across the River Irwell from Manchester. Cowherd believed that ministers should support themselves, and he conducted a school and occasionally practised as a physician. In 1809, he taught that people should "eat no more meat till the world endeth" and abstain from alcoholic drinks.

The denomination he founded was known as the Bible Christian Church, distinct from the Methodist denomination of the same name based in south-west England. The church's teaching on abstinence from meat formed part of the religious context from which later organised vegetarianism in Britain developed. In 1817, 41 members of the Bible Christian Church migrated to the United States, where they formed the Philadelphia Bible Christian Church.

Cowherd has been described as an early advocate of vegetarianism. In a sermon preached on 18 January 1809, he asked his congregation to refrain from eating meat. Later accounts connected the church and its members with the founding of the Vegetarian Society in 1847.

== Death ==
Cowherd died on 24 March 1816 and was buried in the Christ Church yard. At his request, his inscription adapted Alexander Pope's verse about "He who would save a sinking land": "All feared, none loved, and few understood".

== Library ==
Facts Authentic in Science and Religion towards a New Translation of the Bible, compiled by Cowherd, was printed after his death. He left his personal library to the chapel, and it was later transferred to the new Bible Christian Chapel in Cross Lane. According to Axon, "It was at one time a circulating library, accessible to the public upon easy terms, but the books are not such as can be read by those who run." The collection was strong in theology, including the London polyglot edition of the Bible from 1657, and included mystical works and books on health from the seventeenth century and later.

== Publications ==
- Select Hymns for the Use of Bible Christians
- Facts Authentic in Science and Religion: Designed to Illustrate a New Translation of the Bible (Part 1, 1818; Part 2, 1820)

== See also ==
- Christian vegetarianism
- History of vegetarianism
- Vegetarianism in the Victorian era
- Vegetarianism in the United Kingdom
- Temperance movement in the United Kingdom
