= Eleanora Atherton =

English philanthropist

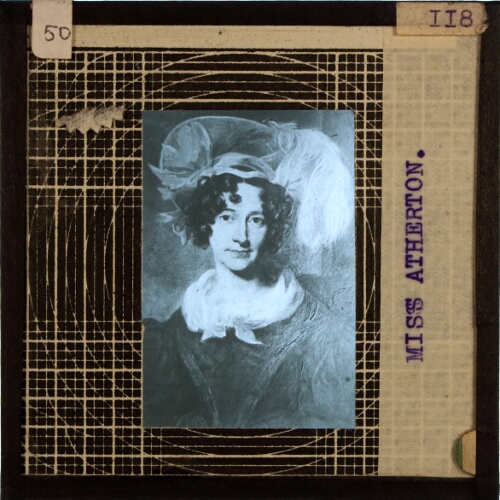
- Born: 14 February 1782
- Died: 12 September 1870 (aged 88); Quay Street, Manchester, England
- Relatives: Edward Byrom (1724–1773) (grandfather). Eleanora Halstead (1727–1758) (grandmother) William Atherton (uncle)

Eleanora Atherton (14 February 1782 – 12 September 1870) was an English philanthropist and heiress associated with Manchester during the late Georgian and Victorian periods. She funded churches, schools, hospitals, and charitable institutions across Manchester and Salford and became one of the wealthiest women in nineteenth-century Britain.

Atherton inherited substantial wealth through the Byrom and Atherton families, including interests in Jamaican sugar plantations established through enslaved labour. Historians have identified her estate as part of the wider network of British colonial wealth that contributed to the growth of philanthropic and civic institutions in industrial Britain.

During her lifetime she was widely commemorated as a major benefactor of Manchester. More recent historical scholarship has reassessed her legacy within the context of Britain’s imperial economy and the relationship between Victorian philanthropy and wealth derived from slavery.

== Early life and family background ==
Atherton was born on 14 February 1782, and baptised in Collegiate Church of St Mary, St Denys and St George on 21 March 1782, the daughter of Henry Atherton (1740–1816), a Preston born barrister of Lincoln's Inn, and Ann Byrom (1751–1826), the great-granddaughter of the poet, John Byrom. Her education is an unknown, although it is known that she grew up in an intellectual environment and did not live an ostentatious lifestyle or travel overseas. Atherton donated to many philanthropic organisations within the Manchester area and beyond. Specifically those that aided the living conditions of the young and the sick, and the elderly, which were often channelled through entities that shared her Anglican faith. Atherton carried on her maternal family tradition of church building and restoration.

Atherton resided half the year at the Byrom family home at 23 Quay Street in Manchester and half at the family's country home, Kersal Cell in Salford. During her lifetime, she was a well known figure in Manchester, simply by her distinct sedan chair and carriage.

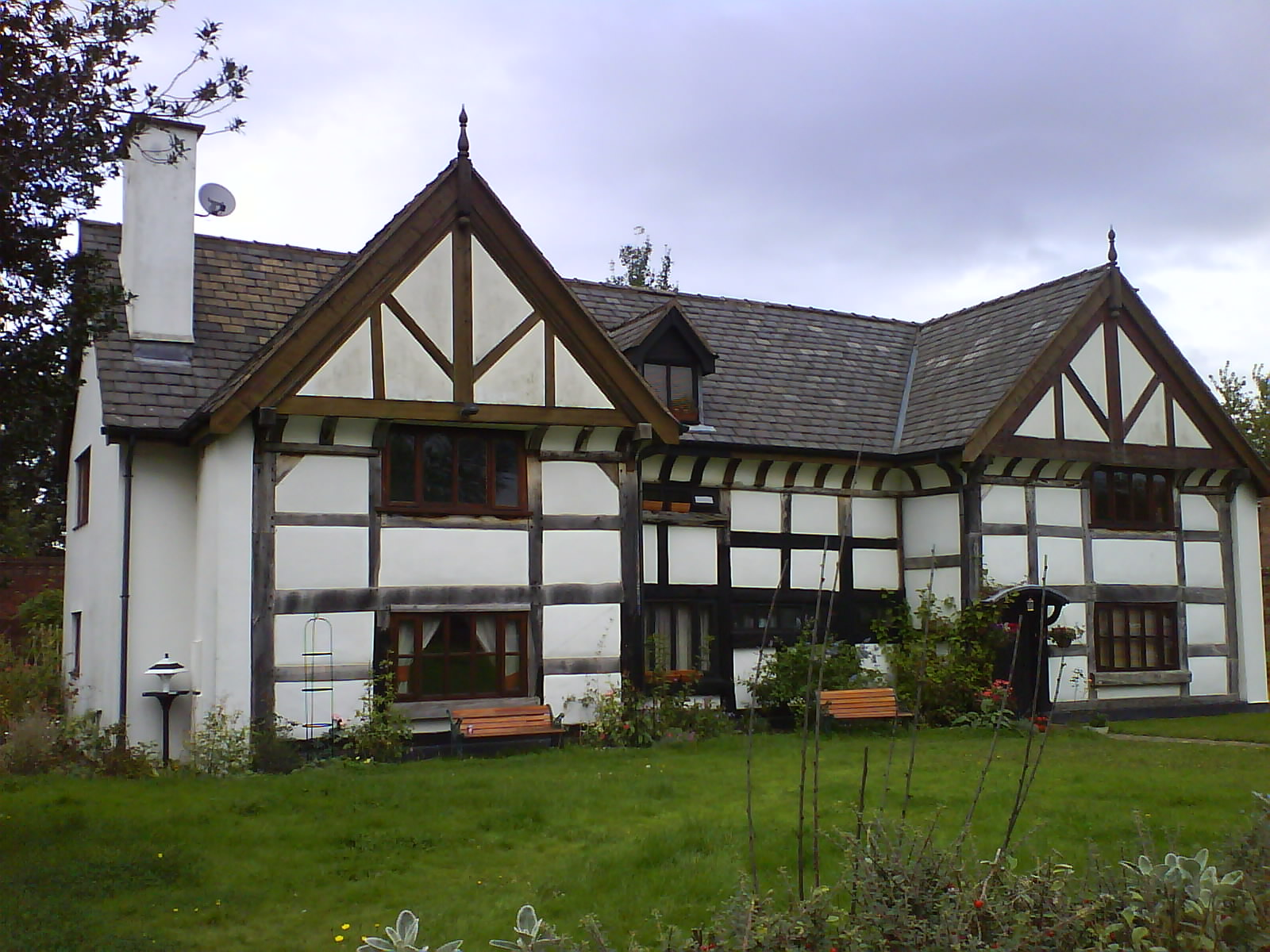
Kersal Cell

== Inheritance and wealth ==
Atherton inherited extensive wealth from family estates. Her fortune included urban and rural property, investment income, and interests connected to plantation estates in Jamaica. The Caribbean estates were sugar plantations that had been bequeathed to both Atherton and her sister in 1823, following the death of her father in August 1816. These profitable estates had been previously owned by her slave-owning uncle, William Atherton who died in 1803.

Between 1819 and 1830, Atherton lived at 12 Great James Street in Bloomsbury, a fashionable residential street, in proximity to numerous cultural, intellectual, and educational institutions. During this time she was painted by Joseph Severn. Throughout the 1850s and the 1860s Atherton served as a Life Governor of the British Institution, prior to it being disbanded in 1867.

== Philanthropy ==
Atherton devoted much of her fortune to religious, educational, and charitable causes. Her philanthropy reflected broader Victorian traditions of Anglican patronage and urban reform, particularly among wealthy industrial and mercantile families.

=== Religious patronage ===
Atherton’s charitable work was closely connected to the Church of England and the expansion of Anglican worship in industrial Manchester. During the nineteenth century, Manchester experienced rapid population growth, creating pressure for new churches and religious institutions.

Atherton provided financial support for church building and restoration projects intended to serve working-class districts of the city. Her donations contributed not only to church construction but also to parish organisation, schools, and charitable outreach activities associated with Anglican congregations.

Her religious philanthropy reflected contemporary beliefs among many elite benefactors that social order, moral improvement, and religious observance were interconnected. Church patronage was therefore often understood as both a spiritual and civic responsibility.

Atherton contributed to the construction, restoration, and endowment of several churches in Manchester and surrounding districts. Among the institutions associated with her patronage were Holy Trinity Church in Hulme and St Paul’s Church in Kersal. Her donations also supported parish schools, clergy housing, and religious education initiatives. In 1841, Atherton donated £18,000 to build Holy Trinity Church in Hulme, Manchester, followed by St Paul's Church on the edge of Kersal Moor, built in 1851. In 1860, she paid for the restoration of the Jesus Chapel in Manchester Cathedral, as well as later contributing to the restoration of the cathedral tower. Several other members of her family funded the building and restoration of various churches and Atherton later bequeathed £5,000 to St John's Church in Manchester which her grandfather, Edward Byrom funded. This church, which is no longer in existence was painted by J. M. W. Turner.

=== Medical and social philanthropy ===
Atherton contributed to hospitals and charitable institutions serving Manchester’s rapidly growing industrial population. These included support for St Mary's Hospital and the Manchester Royal Eye Hospital, alongside donations to schools, welfare organisations, and relief funds for the poor. She funded several buildings in memory of family members including the new wing of a Manchester ragged school in memory of her aunt, Eleanora Byrom, and almshouses in Prescot in memory of her sister, Lucy who died in 1859. Atherton also founded a charity in memory of her sister Lucy Willis in 1860.

Contemporary accounts frequently described Atherton as a significant benefactor of Manchester society. Local newspapers, religious publications, and commemorative accounts emphasised her support for Anglican institutions and charitable activity within expanding industrial districts.

Her philanthropy formed part of a broader pattern in nineteenth-century Britain in which wealthy individuals financed religious and civic institutions in response to urban growth, poverty, and public health concerns associated with industrialisation.

As an independently minded heiress, she refused numerous suitors and chose to remain unmarried throughout her life. At the age of 34, she began to repeatedly inherit country estates and large investments. Consequently, with this financial independence and wealth, Atherton was able to embark on a series of philanthropic causes, a role she may have assumed out of a sense of moral duty or religious conviction.

During her lifetime, Atherton is estimated to have donated several thousand pounds annually to charities in and around Manchester. Between 1838 and 1870, she is thought to have donated a total of approximately £100,000; enough to put her generosity on parity with Humphrey Chetham, who created institutions that she much admired. The charities funded by Atherton typically reflected her Anglican faith and focused on education, children, and support for vulnerable people.

== Public reputation and legacy ==
During her lifetime and for many decades after her death, Atherton was commemorated primarily as a philanthropist and supporter of religious and charitable institutions in Manchester. Memorial inscriptions, local histories, and church records frequently praised her generosity and civic contribution.

Later historical scholarship has presented a more complex interpretation of her legacy by situating her philanthropy within the economic structures of the British Empire and Atlantic slavery. This reassessment reflects broader debates concerning public memory, historical commemoration, and the origins of wealth in nineteenth-century Britain.

Atherton remains a notable figure in the history of Manchester philanthropy and Victorian religious patronage. Her life illustrates the connections between industrial urban development, elite charitable culture, and Britain’s imperial economy during the nineteenth century. Atherton sold land to enable the construction of the Liverpool and Manchester Railway which opened to passengers in 1830. During her lifetime Atherton's charities invested the railways, in 1867 holding 4% stock of the Lancashire and Yorkshire Railway.

Whilst the Preston Historical Society have a picture of Atherton as an elderly lady,, she was also fictionalised as the character "Madame Alice Arlington" in the 1870 novel "Longleat", published as a three-volume work by the Lancashire author Mrs. David Armstrong, who wrote under the pseudonym Elleray Lake. It appeared in the same year as the death of Atherton, adding a notable historical coincidence to its publication context. In this novel Madame Arlington, a diminutive wealthy old lady is described as "straight as an arrow", attired from a bygone age, fully participating in a modern assembly, albeit as a ghost of past times. In real life, Atherton was referred to as Madame Byrom; likely a name she promoted herself, in order to accentuate her maternal lineage of which she was so proud, and society courteously followed.

She was a well-regarded figure in her day. Victorian biographers such as Josiah Rose mention her being "distinguished by honourable wealth", a "generous public spirit" and "wide reaching charity".

== Relationship to slavery and empire ==
Modern historians have reassessed Atherton’s legacy within the wider context of Britain’s imperial economy and the role of colonial wealth in shaping nineteenth-century philanthropy.

Research into the legacies of British slave ownership has demonstrated that many charitable and civic institutions in industrial Britain were funded, directly or indirectly, through fortunes connected to plantation slavery. Atherton’s inherited wealth formed part of this broader historical system.

Scholars have argued that philanthropic activity by wealthy families associated with colonial enterprise helped transform profits derived from slavery into socially prestigious forms of civic and religious patronage. In Manchester, as in other British cities, churches, hospitals, schools, and cultural institutions were often supported by fortunes linked to imperial commerce and plantation ownership.

Historical reassessment of figures such as Atherton reflects changing scholarly approaches to the history of empire, slavery, and philanthropy. Rather than viewing charitable benefactors solely through celebratory local histories, historians increasingly examine the economic origins of inherited wealth and the relationship between empire and urban development.

Atherton became a Caribbean plantation proprietor in 1823. As an absentee landlord, she profited from the use of slave labour on her two Jamaican estates. It is unknown as to whether she sought to better the living and working conditions on these plantations for the 800 slaves she now jointly owned with her sister.

After the abolition of slavery in the British colonies, Atherton and her sister Lucy, the wife of Richard Willis, as slave owners were entitled to claim for the compensation, by the freeing of 544 slaves from the Green Park Estate and 182 slaves from Spring Vale Estate. Jointly they received two separate compensation payments under the Slave Compensation Act 1837. £3,466 8s 8d for the loss of 182 slaves and £10,172 17s 9d for another 544 slaves. The compensation for these Jamaican estates was split between William Harrison of London, and the father of Joseph Feilden, who was first cousin to the Richard Willis, who in turn was Atherton's late brother-in-law. Atherton increased wealth as a result of inheritance of the cumulative wealth of her forebears, upon the death of her younger sibling, Lucy Willis, thereby receiving a share in the estate of her brother-in-law, Richard Willis.

=== Patron of the arts ===
Twenty years prior to her death, Atherton and her secretary Sarah Bolger had organized the printing of a detailed catalogue of the entire John Byrom collection, which comprised 3327 books and 41 manuscripts. In addition, between 1854 and 1857 Atherton released to Chetham's Library an edited version of the Byrom manuscript shorthand diary accounts of his connection with the Jacobite rising of 1745, which included evidence of the involvement of his daughters (Atherton's female forebears), Phoebe, Beppy, and Dolly in an uprising. Atherton also presented a copy of a Renaissance manuscript of the life of Aulus Gellius, by a Florentine scribe named Humbertus W delivered to the merchant Francesco Sassetti in 1470 which subsequently formed part of the Bibliotheca Corviniana, prior to it being stolen by the Ottomans, acquired by her ancestor, John Byron at auction during the 18th century.

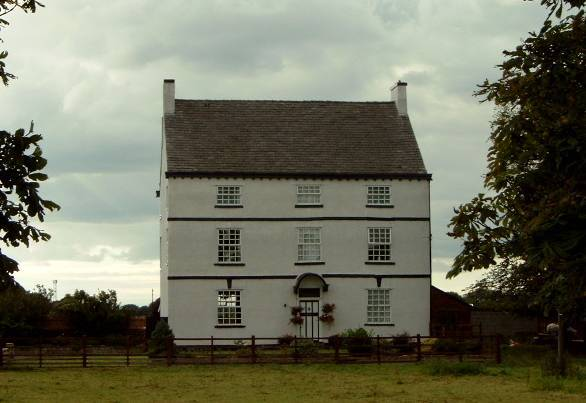
Byrom Hall, Lowton

== Death ==
Eleanora Atherton died on 12 September 1870, in her home in Quay Street where she had been confined for three years. She was buried in St Paul's Church in Kersal, one of the churches which she had funded in 1851. She died one of the richest women in the nineteenth century having left £400,000. Using Per Capita GDP (Relative Income), this sum is roughly equivalent to £347 million today, based on its share of the UK economy rather than inflation. This reflects the scale of wealth and influence it represented at the time.

Her estate continued to support charitable and religious institutions after her death through trusts, endowments, and property arrangements established during her lifetime. Her name remained associated with several Manchester churches and charitable foundations into the late nineteenth century.

=== Bequests upon her death ===
Atherton was perceived as highly respectable and generous during her lifetime. Historians studying the legacies of British slave-ownership have since noted that the origins of her wealth received little scrutiny among her contemporaries, obscured by the visibility and scale of her charitable giving.

The papers of her ancestor, John Byrom were donated to the Chetham's Library. Her private papers were bequeathed to her secretary, Sarah Bolger, who had worked for her for more than 35 years. Bolger retired to Bournemouth where she built a house called 'Atherton' and lived very comfortably until her death in 1889. Mary Ann Degge, Atherton's former Lady's maid was named as Bolger's executor.

Atherton's properties in Prescot and Walton-on-the-Hill were bequeathed to her second cousin, the Reverend James Allan Park, the son of James Allan Park and Lucy Atherton. Her two estates in Jamaica, "Green Park Estate" and "Spring Vale Pen", together with some tenements at Prescot, and chambers in Lincoln's Inn, London, used by her father were bequeathed to the Reverends' younger brother, Alexander Atherton Park, who was also a barrister like her own father. Atherton also left him her father's law books at the chamber.

Some smaller estates were left to a distant cousin, Domville H.C. Poole of Lymm Hall. A final bequest was unusual in the fact that it was not to a blood relative. A large bequest went to Atherton's godson, Edward Fox, son of Edward Vigor-Fox of the Manchester and Salford Yeomanry, who were infamously involved in the Peterloo Massacre and likely descended from Jane Vigor. Fox was directed to use the name of "Atherton Byrom", in order to inherit her Manchester estates and land at Chester, and her cherished retreat, Kersal Cell, along with the entire Byrom Hall estate, in Lowton, which included the right to use the Byrom crest. A Royal Licence was granted by the Queen on 29 December 1870. The godson became Edward Byrom of Culver House and Kersal. He lived in Holcombe Burnell, and became High Sheriff of Devon in 1888. His elder son was Edward Clement Atherton Byrom, who married Katharine Mary Coopland, and his younger son (by his second wife) was Edward Luttrell Grimston Byrom, who married and then divorced Duff Twysden.

Another of Atherton's bequests went to Richard Atherton, a merchant residing in Philipsburg, Centre County, Pennsylvania; to be held in trust and divided between William, Francis and Isabella Atherton equally.
