= Josiah Owen =

Welsh Presbyterian minister

Josiah Owen (1711?–1755) was a Welsh Presbyterian minister in north England, known as a controversialist.

== Life ==
Owen was born about 1711, a nephew of James Owen (1654–1706) and Charles Owen. He is generally said to have been the son of their eldest brother, David Owen (died 7 October 1710, aged 59), minister of Henllan, Carmarthenshire, and may have been a posthumous son.

Josiah Owen was educated by his uncle Charles Owen at Warrington. His first settlement as minister was at Bridgnorth in Shropshire (after 1729), which he left in 1735. He then ministered for short periods at Walsall, and at Stone, Staffordshire.

Some time after June 1740 Owen became minister of Blackwater Street Chapel, Rochdale, Lancashire. His ministry was immediately successful, and his chapel was enlarged in 1743. He came to prominence with the 1745 Jacobite Rebellion, as a political and religious writer against Jacobitism.

Though nominally a Presbyterian, Owen was opposed to formal synods and assemblies. With James Wood as ally, he is said to have been instrumental in the period about 1740 to 1750) in stopping the customary questions on the internal state of congregations from the meeting’ of the Lancashire ministers.

Owen's ministry at Rochdale ended on 14 June 1752. He became minister of the Presbyterian congregation at Ellenthorp, Yorkshire, where he died in 1755, aged 44.

== Works ==
Owen has been given credit for a quip on the word Jacobite which belongs to Daniel Burgess (that the Israelites as descendants of Jacob weren't called "Jacobites" because that was God's choice in the matter). He published a sermon with the title, All is well; or the Defeat of the late Rebellion … an exalted and illustrious Blessing, 1746. He was particularly harsh about Thomas Deacon: an anonymous letter in the Whitehall Evening Post (11 October) scoffed at Deacon for pulling off his hat when passing the head of his executed son on the Manchester Exchange, and this letter was defended in the Gentleman's Magazine by a letter at the end of the year from "Philopatriæ", who was Owen. John Byrom referred in An Epistle to a Friend to "the low-bred O——ns of the age", and published a ballad on "the zealot of Rochdale", under the title of Sir Lowbred O .. N, or the Hottentot Knight.

Owen published sermons, including ones in 1746 for the funerals of Charles Owen and James Hardman; and also:

- A Letter to the Bishop of Litchfield and Coventry, 1746; two editions in the same year.
- Jacobite and Non-juring Principles freely Examined, Manchester, 1747; 2nd edit. 1748. Among other answers was A Letter to the Clergy of Manchester thought to be by Thomas Percival.
- Dr. Deacon try'd before his own Tribunal, Manchester, 1748.

== Notes ==
Attribution

This article incorporates text from a publication now in the public domain: Lee, Sidney, ed. (1895). "Owen, Josiah". Dictionary of National Biography. Vol. 42. London: Smith, Elder & Co.
