= Harriet Wainwright =

British composer, singer and writer

Harriet Wainwright Stewart (c. 1766–1843) was a British composer, singer, and writer. A musical entrepreneur, she developed a subscription list of several hundred people and sold at least two of her compositions (Comala and Seringapatam) to subscribers.

== Early years ==
Wainwright's father was Liverpool musician Robert Wainwright. Her teachers included Dr. Richard Woodward, organist of Christ Church, Dublin, and John Worgan, a London organist known for his performances at Vauxhall Gardens. She moved to London in the 1780s, where she socialized with music historian Charles Burney, who commented that he knew of no female contrapuntist in Europe who could surpass Wainwright.

Wainwright's opera Comala was performed at Hanover Square in London on 26 January 1792. Sophia Corri and James Bartleman sang the leads. Six boys from the choir at Westminster Abbey were the chorus, coached by the Abbey organist Dr. Benjamin Cooke. Composers Ignaz Pleyel and Joseph Haydn attended the performance and praised the opera. Wainwright sold copies of the score to her subscription list.

== India ==
Wainwright moved to Calcutta, India, in 1796. In 1801, she married Captain John Stewart of the East India Company's Bengal Army, who eventually became a lieutenant colonel. She continued to publish her compositions under the name "Wainwright."

Comala was performed in India with Wainwright singing the main role. Richard, Marquis of Wellesley, Governor of India, published an "appreciation" of the work in the Calcutta Post on 27 April 1804.

An unidentified admirer sent Wainwright a poem about the British victory at Seringapatam (see Srirangapatna), and suggested that she set it to music. The chorus she composed based on this poem was also sold to her subscription list.

== Later years ==
The Stewarts left India in 1811 and were living in Perth, Scotland, when John died in 1820. Wainwright eventually moved back to London, where she published Critical Remarks on the Art of Singing in 1836 and her will was filed in 1843.

Wainwright's music was published by Cianchettini and William Napier. Several of her manuscripts are archived at the British Library. Her compositions included:

== Opera ==
- Comala (text by Ossian)
- Don Quixote

== Vocal ==
- Collection of Songs: Duets, Trios & Choruses
- "Merrily, Merrily Passes the Day"
- Seringapatam (chorus; text by William Mason)
