= Robert Wainwright (composer) =

English church organist and composer

Robert Wainwright (1748 – 15 July 1782) was an English church organist and composer. He was the son of John Wainwright, whom he succeeded as organist at the Manchester Collegiate Church (later Manchester Cathedral) on his father's death in 1768. His daughter Harriet Wainwright also became a composer. After moving to Liverpool he became the organist at St Peter's on 1 March 1775. Wainwright composed church music and wrote an oratorio, The Fall of Egypt, first performed in Liverpool in 1780, as well as sonatas and concertos. His work has been described by musicologist Ronald Kidd as "competent and occasionally engaging ... although ... of little consequence".
