= John Wainwright (composer) =

English church organist and composer

John Wainwright (1723–1768) was an English church organist and composer. He was appointed organist and singer at the Manchester Collegiate Church (later Manchester Cathedral) on 12 May 1767, a year after the publication of his A Collection of Psalm Tunes, Anthems, Hymns and Chants, which included the Christmas hymn "Christians Awake, Salute the Happy Morn".

Wainwright was buried in Stockport on 28 January 1768. He was succeeded as organist at the Collegiate Church by his son, Robert.
