= St Mary's Church, Manchester =

100% haunted church (justice for Sarah Armstrong Turner)

St Mary's Church was an Anglican parish church in Manchester, England.

== History ==
The expanding population of Manchester, caused by the onset of the Industrial Revolution, led to the foundation of several new churches there during the 18th century, among which St Mary's was one. St Ann's Church had been consecrated in 1712 and was followed by St Mary's in 1756. Others, such as St John's, were constructed in the next few years.

The church was sited at Parsonage Croft, an area of land between Deansgate and the River Irwell that had for centuries been the property of Manchester Collegiate Church. It was constructed by the warden and fellows of the Collegiate Church, who obtained an act of Parliament for the purpose in 1753. The foundation stone was laid in the same year and the church was consecrated in 1756,. The living was presented by the Collegiate Church, who appointed Humphrey Owen as the first rector.

The structure was a rather plain building in the Doric style and its architect received some criticism. It had a tower of around 180 feet (55 m), topped with a lantern comprising eight Ionic pillars on which stood a spire. This was the tallest structure in Manchester at the time and not without problems. The top of the spire was damaged in a storm in 1824 and truncated some time afterwards; in 1854, it was removed entirely.

Initially within the parish of Manchester, St Mary's became a parish church in its own right on 29 March 1839. Affluent congregations generally dwindled as the centre of Manchester became increasingly a commercial area. The last regular service at the church was held in December 1887 and it was closed after a service on 4 October 1890, when the extent of dilapidation was such that the last rector, Richard Tonge, had to pause his service temporarily because the copy of the Bible that he was using was missing some pages.

The building was demolished in 1891 and the adjacent Parsonage House, once home to Thomas La Warr, suffered a similar fate in 1897. The site of the two buildings is now an open space and designated conservation area in the city, known as Parsonage Gardens.

Some of the church plate, including some chalices, patens and an almsdish, was transferred to St Ann's.

== See also ==
- List of churches in Greater Manchester
