= Thomas Percival (antiquarian) =

English antiquary

Thomas Percival (1719–1762) was an English antiquary.

== Life ==
The son of Richard Percival of Royton Hall, near Oldham in Lancashire, he was born there on 1 September 1719. He was brought up a Presbyterian, but joined the Church of England A Whig in politics, he was an advocate of the Hanoverian succession.

Percival was elected Fellow of the Royal Society on 25 November 1756, and Fellow of the Society of Antiquaries of London on 12 June 1760. He died in December 1762, and was buried in St. Paul's Church, Royton.

== Works ==
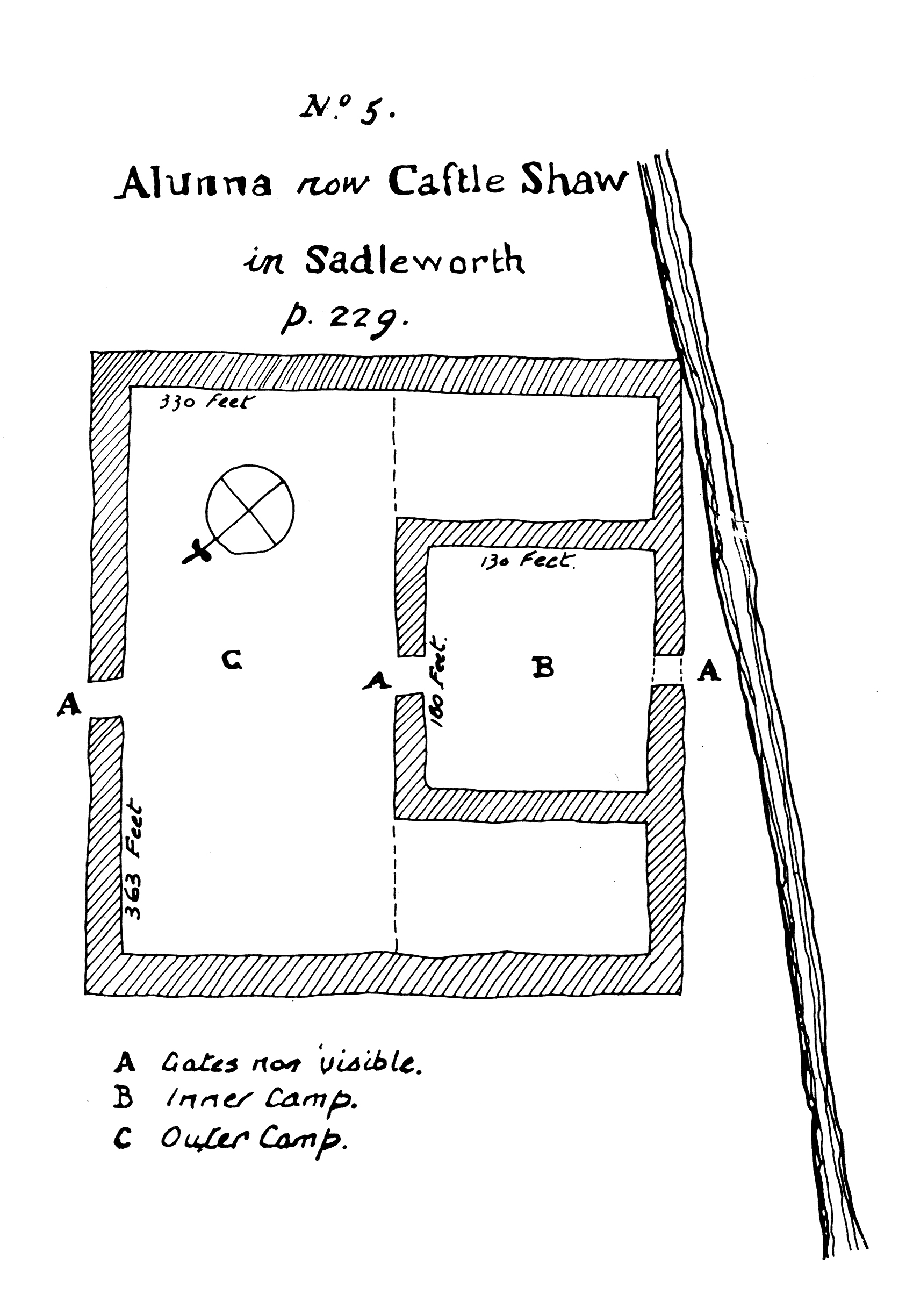
A plan of Castleshaw Roman fort, drawn by Thomas Percival

In 1748 Percival wrote two pamphlets in opposition to local High Church clergy: A Letter to the Reverend the Clergy of the Collegiate Church of Manchester, and Manchester Politics: a Dialogue between Mr. Trueblew and Mr. Whiglove. He attacked in particular John Clayton, who had demonstrated Jacobite sympathies during the 1745 rebellion. In this he was following up Josiah Owen and his Jacobite and Non-juring Principles freely Examined (1747).

In 1758 Percival took part with some weavers in a dispute with their masters about wages. He published about his experiences A Letter to a Friend occasioned by the late Dispute betwixt the Check-Makers of Manchester and their Weavers; and the Check-Makers' Ill-usage of the Author, Halifax, 1759.

Percival wrote about Roman roads in Philosophical Transactions and Archæologia, and discovered that Kinderton was the site of the Roman salt production centre Condate. Some of the plans of ancient remains given in John Aikin's Country round Manchester were drawn by him.

== Family ==
Percival married Martha, daughter of Major Benjamin Gregge of Chamber Hall, Oldham. She died in 1760, aged 45. Their only child Katherine, married Joseph Pickford of Alt Hill, Lancashire. Pickford was later known as Sir Joseph Radcliffe, 1st Baronet, of Milnesbridge, Yorkshire, and it was to him that Percival's collection of manuscript pedigrees and other papers passed.

== Notes ==
Attribution

This article incorporates text from a publication now in the public domain: Lee, Sidney, ed. (1895). "Percival, Thomas (1719-1762)". Dictionary of National Biography. Vol. 44. London: Smith, Elder & Co.
