= Christians, awake, salute the happy morn =

English Christmas hymn

- Christmas hymn
- Written: c. 1750
- Text: adapted from a poem by John Byrom
- Language: English
- Meter: 10.10.10.10.10.10
- Melody: "Yorkshire"
- Published: 1766

"Christians, awake, salute the happy morn" is an English Christmas hymn on a text by John Byrom. It is usually sung to the tune "Yorkshire" by John Wainwright.

== Text ==
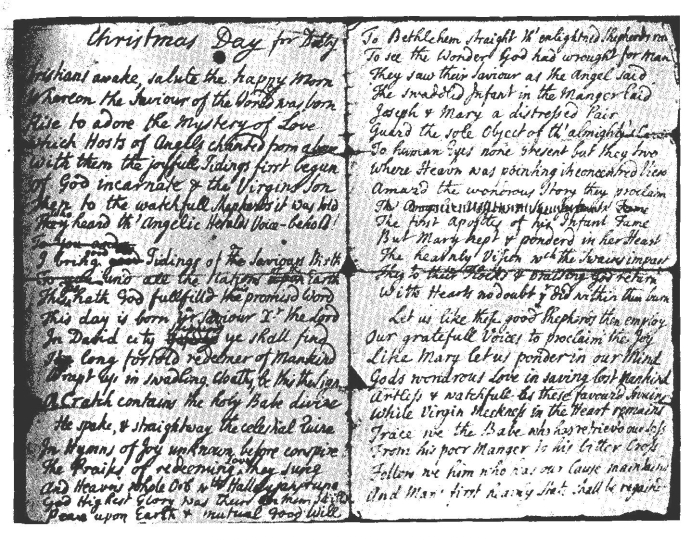
A facsimile of the original manuscript

The text of the hymn is from a poem in iambic pentameter by John Byrom. The original manuscript, in Chetham's Library, Manchester, bears the title "Christmas Day. For Dolly", referring to the author's daughter, although there is no evidence to support the oft repeated story that it was written for her specifically. The original poem was in three paragraphs of 16 lines each (for a total of 48). The exact date of this document is uncertain, although it is usually dated between 1745 and 1750. This was later published in the author's posthumous Poems, &c. (1773) and later again in his Works (1814, vol. ii).

The omission of some of the lines and re-arrangement of the remainder into singable verses appeared in combination with Wainwright's music in a 1766 publication, although the first printing for liturgical usage was Thomas Cotterill's Selection of Psalms and Hymns (1819, 8th ed.), retaken shortly thereafter in James Montgomery's Christian Psalmist (1825). The modern text, which runs to six verses of six lines, is frequently shortened, omitting one or two stanzas. The fifth verse ("Oh, may we keep and ponder in our mind") is sometimes replaced with an alternative one beginning "Like Mary let us ponder in our mind". A version by Davies Gilbert in 8 verses, printed in Some Ancient Christmas Carols (1823), stays more faithful to the original poem. (Note: For more details on this, see "Christians, Awake! Salute The Happy Morn – Version 2". www.hymnsandcarolsofchristmas.com.)

The text retells the Christmas story as contained in Luke 2, referring to the birth of Jesus and quoting the angel's proclamation in verses 2 and 3. Verse 4 paraphrases the shepherds adoring the newborn Jesus.

Christians, awake, salute the happy morn,
whereon the Saviour of the world was born;
rise to adore the mystery of love,
which hosts of angels chanted from above:
with them the joyful tidings first begun
of God incarnate and the Virgin's Son.

Then to the watchful shepherds it was told,
who heard the angelic herald's voice, 'Behold,
I bring good tidings of a Saviour's birth
to you and all the nations upon earth:
this day hath God fulfilled his promised word,
this day is born a Saviour, Christ the Lord.'

He spake; and straightway the celestial choir
in hymns of joy, unknown before, conspire;
the praises of redeeming love they sang,
and heaven's whole orb with alleluias rang:
God's highest glory was their anthem still,
peace upon earth, and unto men good will.

To Bethl'em straight the enlightened shepherds ran,
to see the wonder God had wrought for man,
and found, with Joseph and the blessèd Maid,
her Son, the Saviour, in a manger laid:
then to their flocks, still praising God, return,
and their glad hearts with holy rapture burn.

O may we keep and ponder in our mind
God's wondrous love in saving lost mankind;
trace we the babe, who hath retrieved our loss,
from his poor manger to his bitter cross;
tread in his steps, assisted by his grace,
till man's first heavenly state again takes place.

Then may we hope, the angelic hosts among,
to sing, redeemed, a glad triumphal song:
he that was born upon this joyful day
around us all his glory shall display;
saved by his love, incessant we shall sing
eternal praise to heaven's almighty King. (Note: Multiple slight variants to the above text are possible. For a listing of some of them see "Christians Awake Salute The Happy Morn". www.hymnsandcarolsofchristmas.com.)

== Tune ==
The association with the tune "Yorkshire" (sometimes also "Stockport") is an early one: some accounts describe it being sung under the direction of its composer by a group of local men and boys for Christmas 1750, some time after the writing of the poem; although it is not possible to tell how the poem was originally divided along to the tune. The first edition that has it in combination with Byrom's text is in Wainwright's only known musical publication, undated but assumed from newspaper announcements to have been published in 1766. (Note: For excerpts of such contemporary publications, see "A Collection of Psalm Tunes, Anthems, Hymns and Chants (John Wainwright) – ChoralWiki". www.cpdl.org.)

The melody was first published in the Collection of Tunes (1761) by Caleb Ashworth from Lancashire, who presumably "heard and liked" the tune, but as a setting for the paraphrase of Psalm 50 by Isaac Watts, beginning "The God of Glory sends his Summons forth, / Calls the South Nations, and awakes the North". The melody was again reprinted by another Lancashire churchman, Ralph Harrison, in his Sacred Harmony (1784): the popularity of this publication made the tune widely known, including across the Atlantic, although it is unlikely it was much sung by American congregations at the time. In England Byrom’s hymn was sung frequently as an outdoors carol, but it did not make its way into liturgical use until the 1819 publication by Cotterill.

From thence it had passed by the beginning of the 20th century into most hymnals in common use, both in England and America, including Hymns Ancient and Modern, the English Hymnal, and many others thereafter. (Note: For a full listing, see "Christians, Awake". Hymnary.org.)

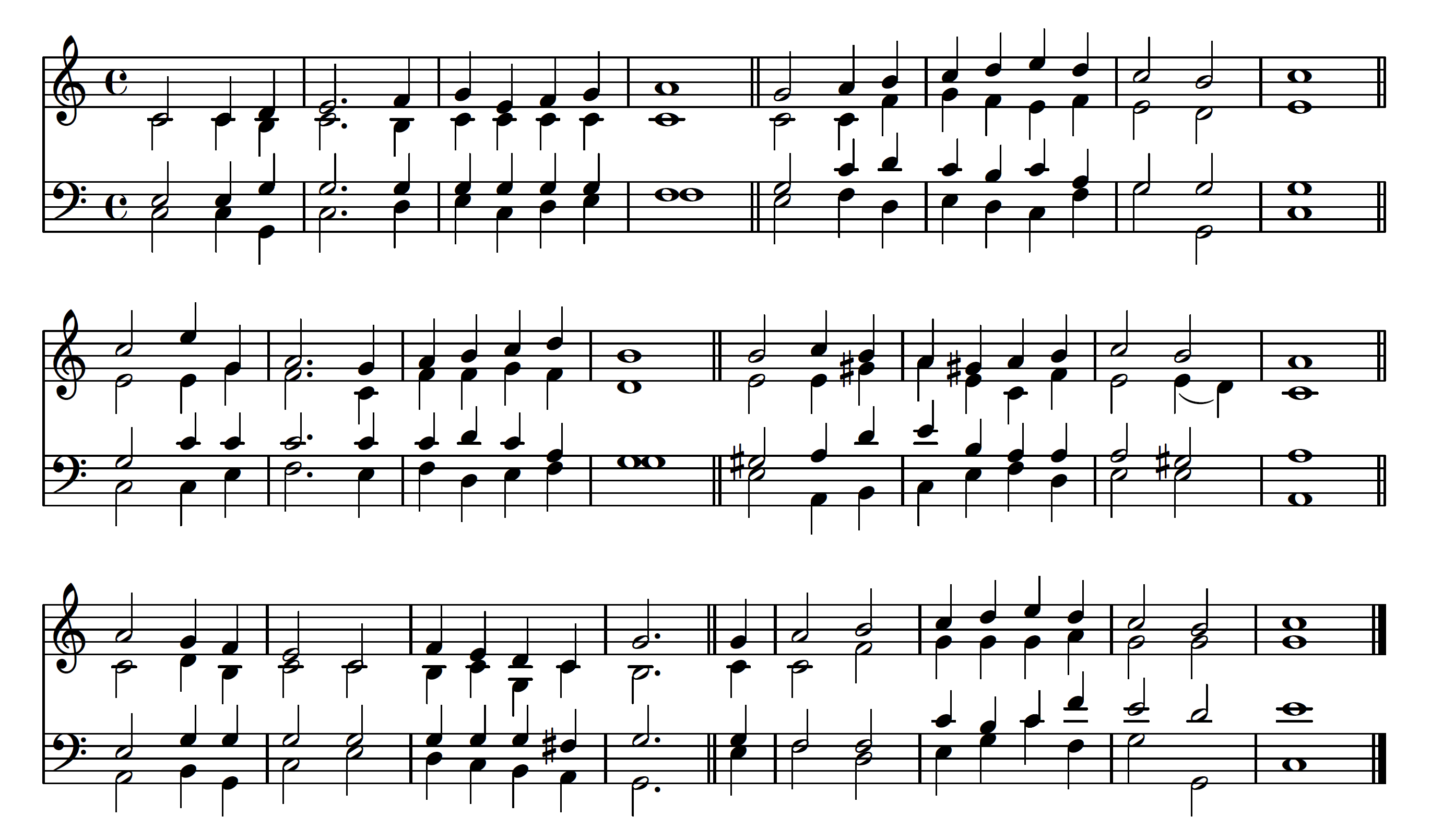

== See also ==
- List of Christmas carols

== Sources ==
- Benson, Louis F. (1924). Studies Of Familiar Hymns, First Series. Philadelphia: The Westminster Press., cited in "Christians Awake Salute The Happy Morn". www.hymnsandcarolsofchristmas.com.
- Harrison, Ralph (1784). Sacred Harmony. London: D'Almaine & Co. p. 104. [reprint c. 1835]
- Julian, John (1907a). A Dictionary of Hymnology. Vol. 1 (Second revised ed.). New York: Dover Publications. p. 231.
- Julian, John (1907b). Dictionary of Hymnology, New Supplement., cited in "Christians, Awake". Hymnary.org.
- Temperley, Nicholas (2016). "Christians, awake, salute the happy morn – Yorkshire 'Stockport' (Wainwright/Cleobury)". www.hyperion-records.co.uk. Hyperion Records.
- Wainwright, John (1766). A Collection of Psalm Tunes, Anthems, Hymns, and Chants, for One, Two, Three, and Four Voices, etc. London: For the author. pp. 66–67.
- Watson, John Richard, ed. (2013). "Christians, awake! salute the happy morn". The Canterbury Dictionary of Hymnology. Canterbury Press.
