= Kersal Priory =

Listed building in Greater Manchester, England

Coordinates: 53°30′37″N 2°17′19″W

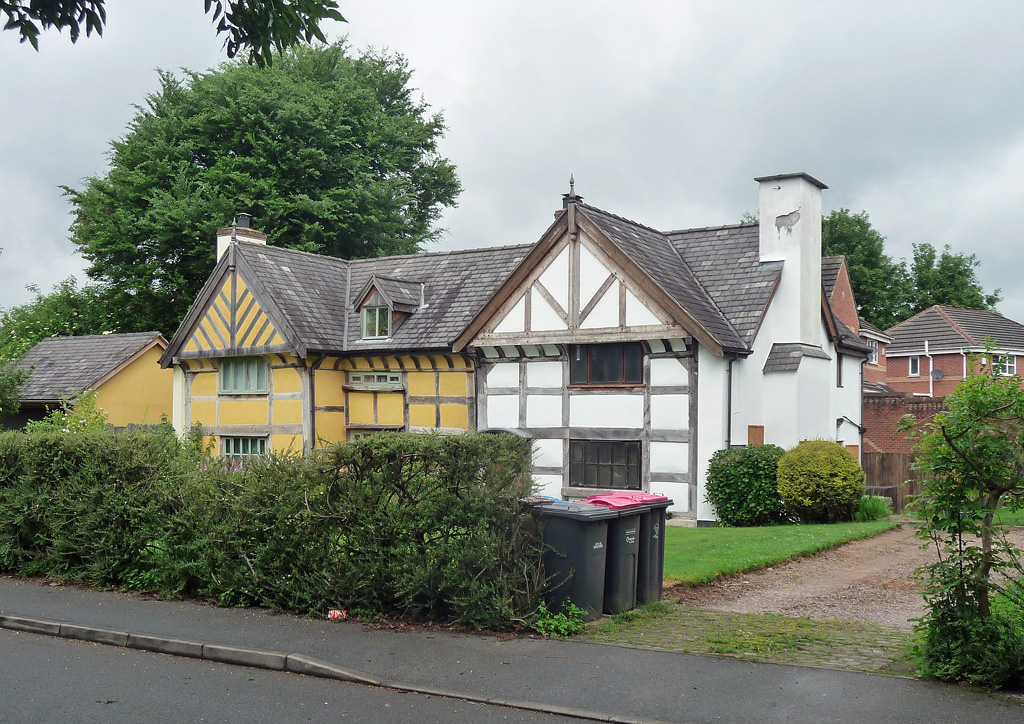
- The building in 2017

- Location within Greater Manchester
- Alternative names: St Leonard's

General information
- Location: Kersal, Salford, Greater Manchester, England
- Year built: c. 16th century with later additions

Technical details
- Material: Timber-framed with plaster infill, sandstone
- Floor count: 2

Design and construction
- Designations

Listed Building – Grade II*
- Official name: Kersal Cell
- Designated: 31 January 1952
- Reference no.: 1386144

Kersal Priory, also known as St Leonard's, is a priory in Kersal, a district of Salford in Greater Manchester, England. It is classed as an alien priory or hermitage, and was populated by Cluniac monks. The priory was dependent on Lenton in Nottinghamshire. Founded between 1145 and 1453, it was granted title by Ranulf de Gernon, 4th Earl of Chester sometime after 1143, became denizen independent from 1392, and was dissolved in 1538. One of the buildings, Kersal Cell, is still extant; a Grade II* listed building, it is now a private residence.

== See also ==
- Grade II* listed buildings in Greater Manchester
- List of monastic houses in Greater Manchester
- List of monastic houses in England
- Listed buildings in Salford
