= Edward Byrom =

British businessman (1724-1773)

- Born: 1724
- Died: 1773 (aged 48–49)
- Occupation: Businessman

Edward Byrom (13 June 1724 – 24 April 1773) was a prominent figure in 18th-century Manchester, England, and served for a period as borough-reeve.

== Life ==
He was the only son of John Byrom of the wealthy Byrom family. His eldest sister was Elizabeth Byrom who recorded her and her family's enthusiasm for the young pretender Bonnie Prince Charlie in 1745.

Edward Byrom co-founded the first bank in Manchester and ordered the construction of St John's Church in 1769. The church, demolished in 1931, was situated on Byrom Street, a street which was named after his family. He married Eleanora Halstead, who bore him four girls before her death in 1758: Ann Byrom (1751–1826), Elizabeth Byrom (1754–1754), Felicia Byrom (1755–1757) and Eleanora Byrom (1756–1838). His granddaughter was English philanthropist Eleanora Atherton.
