= John Byrom =

English poet

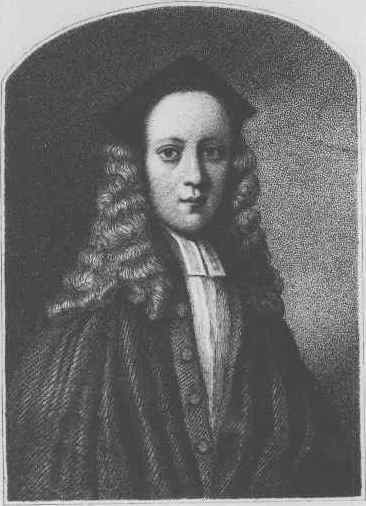
- Portrait of Byrom as a young man
- Born: 29 February 1692; Manchester, Lancashire, England
- Died: 26 September 1763 (aged 71); Manchester, Lancashire, England
- Citizenship: British
- Education: The King's School, Chester; Merchant Taylors' School, Northwood; Trinity College, Cambridge; University of Montpellier
- Alma mater: Trinity College, Cambridge
- Occupations: Poet, inventor of a shorthand system, landowner
- Spouse: Elizabeth Byrom
- Children: Dorothy Byrom, Edward Byrom
- Writing career
- Notable works: Anglican hymn Christians Awake, salute the happy morn Poem My spirit longeth for Thee; Coined the phrase Tweedledum and Tweedledee

John Byrom, John Byrom of Kersal, or John Byrom of Manchester FRS (29 February 1692 – 26 September 1763) was an English poet, the inventor of a revolutionary system of shorthand and later a significant landowner. He is most remembered as the writer of the lyrics of Anglican hymn "Christians, awake, salute the happy morn", which was supposedly a Christmas gift for his daughter.

== Early life ==
Byrom was descended from an old genteel Lancashire family. Ralph Byrom came to Manchester from Lowton in 1485 and became a prosperous wool merchant. His son Adam acquired property in Salford, Darcy Lever, Bolton and Ardwick (though his wealth did not prevent his mentally ill daughter from being accused of witchcraft). Edward Byrom helped to foil a Royalist plot to seize Manchester in 1642.

Byrom was born at what is now The Old Wellington Inn (part of the Old Shambles), Manchester, in 1692. The property was then used as an office for market tolls, with accommodation on the upper floors. The inn, now a tourist attraction, has a plaque in the bar area which commemorates his birth. However, some sources claim that he was born at Kersal Cell in Lower Kersal in the township of Broughton, near Salford, just outside Manchester.

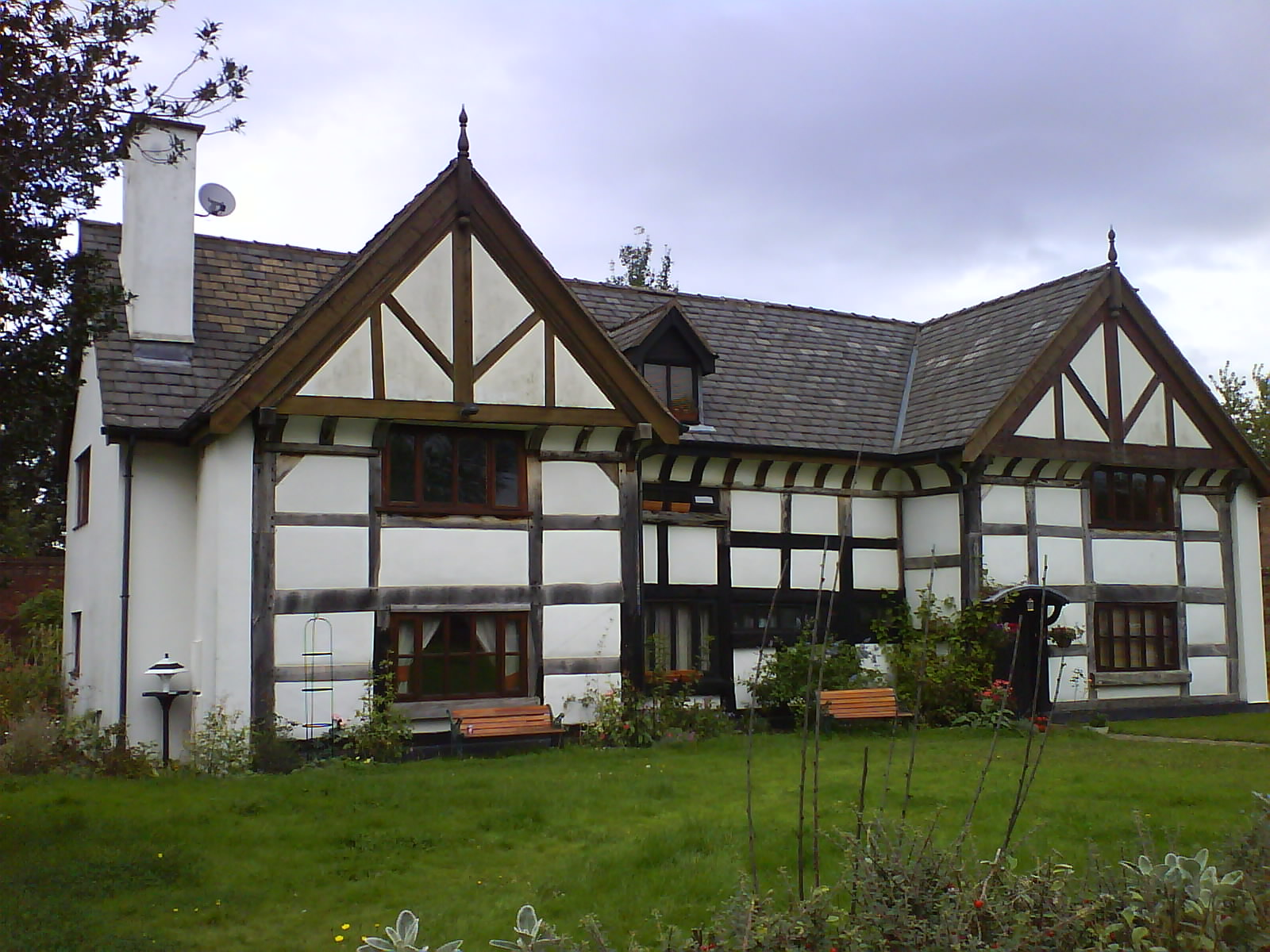
Kersal Cell

According to Bailey he was one of the tallest men in the kingdom.

His privileged background enabled him to obtain an excellent education, including The King's School, Chester, and Merchant Taylors' School, London. He studied at Trinity College, Cambridge, becoming a fellow there in 1714. He subsequently travelled abroad and studied medicine at Montpellier in France.

== Byrom and shorthand ==
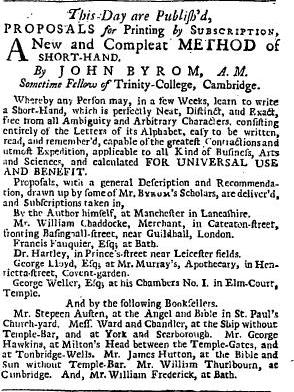
Newspaper advertisement for Byrom's shorthand system from the Daily Gazetteer, 1741

Byrom invented a system of shorthand and, having perfected this, returned to England in 1716. Some of the inhabitants of Manchester tried to persuade him to set up a medical practice in the town, but he decided that his abilities were insufficient to pursue a medical career and resolved to teach his shorthand system instead. Shortly after coming into his family inheritance in 1740, he patented his New Universal Shorthand. This system of shorthand, officially taught at both Oxford and Cambridge universities, was used by the clerk of the House of Lords.

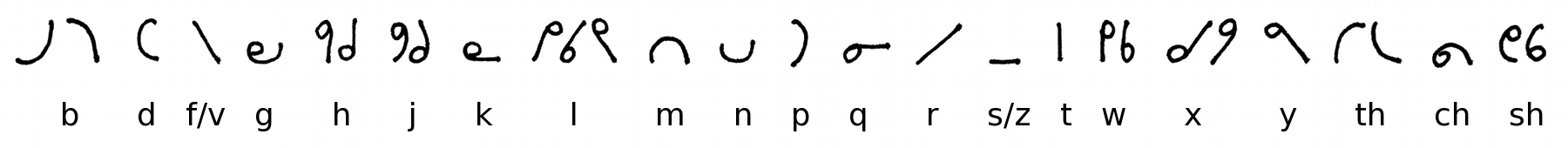

Byrom's Shorthand Act 1741
- Act of Parliament
- Parliament of Great Britain
- Long title: An Act for securing to John Byrom Master of Arts the sole Right of publishing, for a certain Term of Years, the Art and Method of Short Hand invented by him.
- Citation: 15 Geo. 2. c. 23
- Territorial extent: Great Britain

Dates
- Royal assent: 16 June 1742
- Commencement: 1 December 1741 (Note: Start of session.)
- Repealed: 30 July 1948
Other legislation
Repealed by	Statute Law Revision Act 1948

Status: Repealed

Text of statute as originally enacted

On 16 June 1742, the Byrom's Shorthand Act 1741 (15 Geo. 2. c. 23) secured to John Byrom, M.A., the sole right of publishing for a certain term of years (21) the art and method of shorthand invented by him.

His system of shorthand was posthumously published as The Universal English Shorthand which, although superseded in the nineteenth century, marked a significant development in the history of shorthand. It was used by John (1703–1791) and Charles Wesley (1707–1788), founders of Methodism, who recorded their self-examinations in coded diaries.

== Family life ==
The ancestral home of the Byrom family is Byrom Hall at Slag Lane in Lowton (the lane facing the hall is called Byrom Lane).

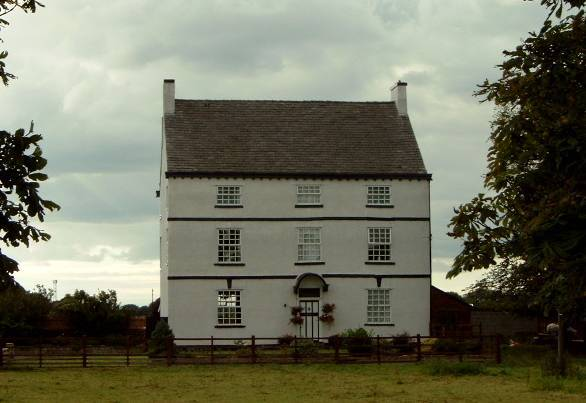
Byrom Hall, Lowton, Greater Manchester

He lived here from time to time, but seems to have largely resided in a town house in Manchester and at Kersal Cell.

Byrom had three daughters and a son. His eldest child was the diarist and Jacobite supporter Elizabeth "Beppy" and his son was named Edward. His favourite was his daughter Dorothy, known as Dolly. In December 1745, after a romp with Dolly, he promised to write her something for Christmas; it was to be written especially for her and no one else. The delighted Dolly reminded her father of his promise each day as Christmas grew nearer. On Christmas morning, when she ran down to breakfast, she found several presents awaiting her. Among them was an envelope addressed to her in her father's handwriting. It was the first thing she opened and, to her great delight, it proved to be a Christmas carol entitled "Christians, awake, salute the happy morn". The original manuscript, headed with "Christmas Day for Dolly", was first published in Harrop's Manchester Mercury in 1746.

== Literary remains ==
Although Byrom is probably best remembered for this Christmas carol, he was regarded by his contemporaries as a poet and a literary man. Most of his poems, the best-known of which is My spirit longeth for Thee, were religious in tone. Byrom greatly admired William Law and he often versified parts of Law's prose. The printer and novelist Samuel Richardson printed poems for Byrom, some of which were found upon Richardson's death among his manuscripts. Byrom is also remembered for his epigrams and, above all, his coinage of the phrase Tweedledum and Tweedledee (in connection with a dispute about the merits of the two composers, George Frideric Handel and Giovanni Bononcini).

Ralph Tomlinson authored a parody of John Byrom's poem called A Slang Pastoral. It begins "My Time, O ye Muses, was happily spent," and it was originally published in The Spectator.

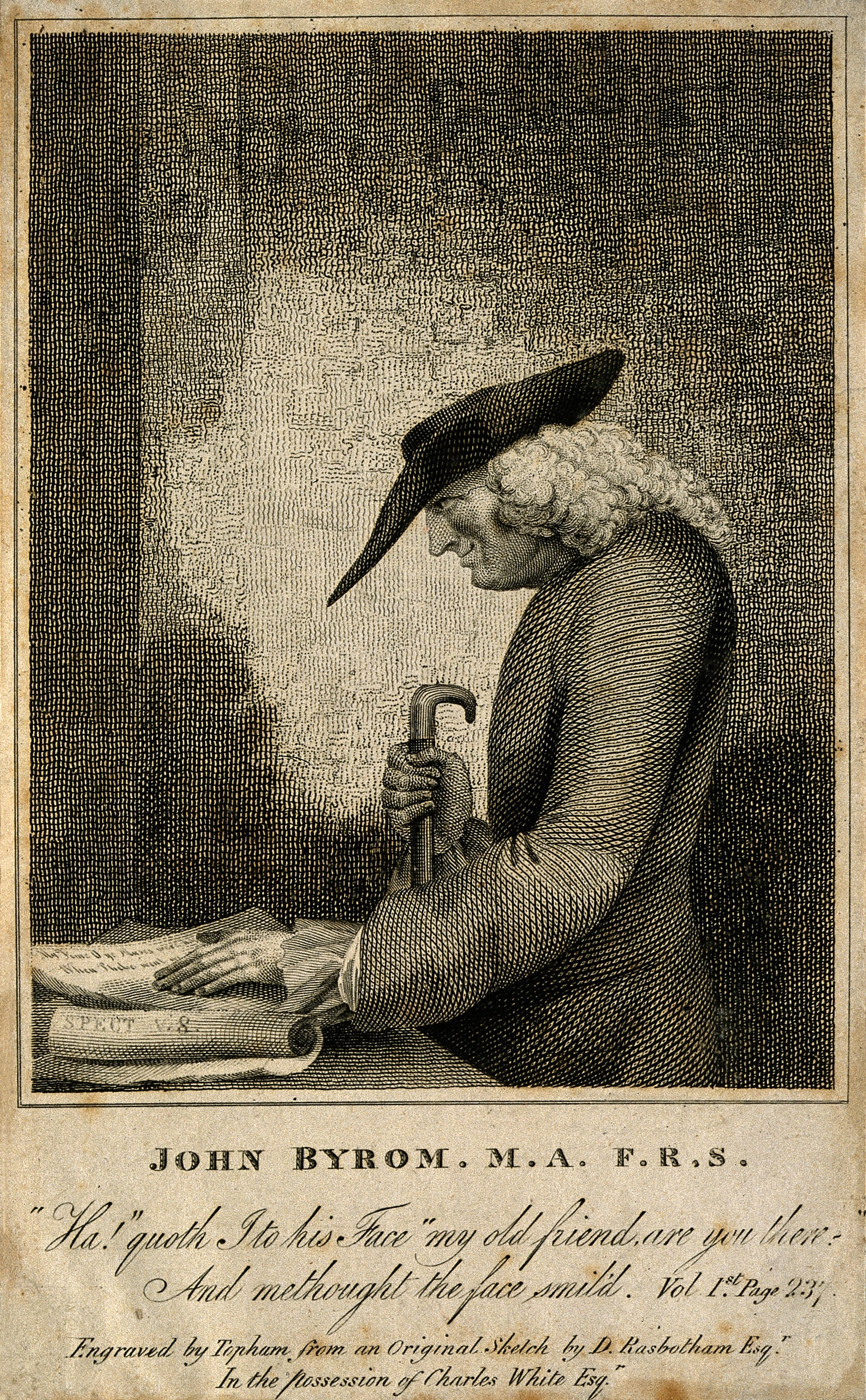
John Byrom. Line engraving by Topham after D. Rasbotham

== A man of mystery ==
Byrom did not lead an ordinary provincial life. He was a member of the Royal Society while Sir Isaac Newton was president, moving in some very influential social and intellectual circles in London and elsewhere. Modern research has revealed him to be something of a man of mystery. In the first place there is the question of his political views. It was once thought that he was a closet Jacobite, but it is now suggested that he may have acted as a double agent, the "Queen's Chameleon". His views might be summed up in the verse that he composed, in the form of a toast:

God bless the King! (I mean our faith's defender!)
God bless! (No harm in blessing) the Pretender.
But who Pretender is, and who is King,
God bless us all! That's quite another thing!

Byrom died in 1763 and is buried in his family's private chapel, which is now known as Jesus Chapel in Manchester Cathedral. His papers, though preserved for some time after his death, were mysteriously destroyed in the nineteenth century. A freemason, few surviving items have suggested that he may have belonged to an early quasi-masonic society, known as the "Cabala Club", similar to the Gentleman's Club of Spalding, and pursued occult interests.

He was survived by his wife who died in December 1778. All of his estate and the family home of Kersall Cell, Salford was left to Elizabeth Byrom.

His library of books and manuscripts were donated to Chetham's Library by his descendant Eleanora Atherton in 1870.

Byrom's papers were accumulated by the John Rylands Research Institute and Library throughout the 20th century and referred to as the Thomson-Byrom following donations by Rev. W. H. Thomson of Manchester in 1961 and 1963, and the third by his niece, Miss V. Keable, in 1971.

== Sources ==
- Joy Hancox, The Queen's Chameleon: The Life of John Byrom. A Study of Conflicting Loyalties (Jonathan Cape, 1994)
- T. Swindells, Manchester Streets and Manchester Men (1910)
- Bailey, Albert Edward (1950). The Gospel in Hymns. New York: Charles Scribner's Sons. pp. 112–114.
- Julian, John (June 1907). A Dictionary of Hymnology. London: John Murray. p. 199.
- Stephen, Leslie (1898). "John Byrom". Studies of a Biographer. Vol. 1. London: Duckworth and Co. pp. 74–104.
