= 2024–25 Salford City F.C. season =

85th season in existence of Salford City FC

Salford City
2024–25 season
- Owner: Project 92 Limited
- Head coach: Karl Robinson
- Stadium: Moor Lane
- League Two: 8th
- FA Cup: Third round
- EFL Cup: First round
- EFL Trophy: Group stage
- Top goalscorer: League: Cole Stockton (9); All: Cole Stockton (11)
- Biggest win: 3-0 v Notts County 14 December 2024 (League Two); 3-0 v Barrow (Home) 26 December 2024 (League Two)
- Biggest defeat: 8-0 v Manchester City (Away) 11 January 2025 (FA Cup)
| Home colours | Third colours |

The 2024–25 season is the 85th season in the history of Salford City Football Club and their sixth consecutive season in League Two. In addition to the domestic league, the club are also participating in the FA Cup, the EFL Cup, and the 2024–25 EFL Trophy.

== Transfers ==
=== In ===
| Date | Pos. | Player | From | Fee | Ref. |
|---|---|---|---|---|---|
| 14 June 2024 (Note: The transfer was announced on 7 June, and would become official on June 14 once the transfer window re-opened) | CF | Cole Stockton (ENG) | Burton Albion (ENG) | Undisclosed | |
| 1 July 2024 (Note: The transfer was announced on 5 June, and would become official on July 1 once his West Ham United contract expired) | RM | Daniel Chesters (ENG) | West Ham United (ENG) | Free | |
| 13 July 2024 | RB | Tom Edwards (ENG) | Stoke City (ENG) | Free | |
| 17 July 2024 | CB | James Chester (WAL) | Barrow (ENG) | Free | |
| 18 July 2024 | GK | Jamie Jones (ENG) | Middlesbrough (ENG) | Free | |
| 20 July 2024 | RM | Jon Taylor (ENG) | Doncaster Rovers (ENG) | Free | |
| 23 July 2024 | AM | Ben Woodburn (WAL) | Preston North End (ENG) | Free | |
| 17 August 2024 | CM | Josh Austerfield (ENG) | Huddersfield Town (ENG) | Undisclosed | |
| 26 August 2024 | CM | Jai Curran-Nicholls (AUS) (Note: Signed initially for the 'B team') | Warrington Rylands (ENG) | Free | |
| 30 August 2024 | RW | Hakeeb Adelakun (ENG) | Lincoln City (ENG) | Free | |
| 30 August 2024 | RB | Haji Mnoga (TAN) | Portsmouth (ENG) | Free | |
| 17 January 2025 | LB | Rosaire Longelo (ENG) | Swindon Town (ENG) | Free | |

=== Out ===
| Date | Pos. | Player | To | Fee | Ref. |
|---|---|---|---|---|---|
| 8 July 2024 | GK | Alex Cairns (ENG) | Leeds United (ENG) | Undisclosed | |
| 12 July 2024 | CF | Callum Hendry (SCO) | Milton Keynes Dons (ENG) | Undisclosed | |

=== Loaned in ===
| Date | Pos. | Player | From | Date until | Ref. |
|---|---|---|---|---|---|
| 1 July 2024 (Note: The loan was announced on 29 June, and would officially commence on July 1) | CB | Stephan Negru (IRL) | Oxford United (ENG) | 9 January 2025 (Note: On 9 January, Negru was recalled back to his parent club Oxford) | |
| 18 July 2024 | GK | Matthew Young (ENG) | Sunderland (ENG) | End of Season | |
| 14 August 2024 | CM | Tyrese Fornah (SLE) | Derby County (ENG) | End of Season | |
| 30 August 2024 | CF | Kylian Kouassi (ENG) | Blackpool (ENG) | End of Season | |
| 30 August 2024 | CF | Francis Okoronkwo (ENG) | Everton (ENG) | End of Season | |
| 23 January 2025 | CB | Stephan Negru (IRL) | Oxford United (ENG) | End of Season | |
| 23 January 2025 | CM | Lewis Warrington (ENG) | Leyton Orient (ENG) | End of Season | |

=== Loaned out ===
| Date | Pos. | Player | To | Date until | Ref. |
|---|---|---|---|---|---|
| 4 July 2024 | CF | Callum Morton (ENG) | Northampton Town (ENG) | End of Season | |
| 30 August 2024 | CF | Robbie Cleary (CAN) | FC United of Manchester (ENG) | 28 September 2024 | |
| 30 August 2024 | CF | Marcus Dackers (WAL) | Morecambe (ENG) | End of Season | |
| 7 September 2024 | CM | Liam Humbles (ENG) | Altrincham (ENG) | 14 December 2024 (Note: On 11 October and then on 15 November, Humbles' loan at Altrincham was extended by a further month) | |
| 13 September 2024 | CM | Jez Davies (ENG) | Marine (ENG) | 12 October 2024 | |
| 20 September 2024 | CM | Jai Curran-Nicholls (ENG) | Warrington Rylands (ENG) | 19 October 2024 | |
| 27 September 2024 | CF | Kamoy McNair (ENG) | Stalybridge Celtic (ENG) | 26 November 2024 (Note: On 29 October, McNair's loan at Stalybridge was extended for a further month) | |
| 8 October 2024 | CF | Sandro Da Costa (ENG) | Warrington Rylands (ENG) | 5 November 2024 | |
| 25 October 2024 | CM | Jacob Hamman (ENG) | Leek Town (ENG) | 23 November 2024 | |
| 16 November 2024 | CM | Jez Davies (ENG) | Ebbsfleet United (ENG) | 14 December 2024 | |
| 21 December 2024 | CM | Liam Humbles (ENG) | Gateshead (ENG) | End of Season (Note: On 29 January, Humbles' loan at Gateshead was extended until the end of season) | |
| 13 January 2025 | CF | Robbie Cleary (CAN) | Bamber Bridge (ENG) | 30 April 2025 (Note: On 17 March, Cleary's loan at Bamber Bridge was extended by a further two-months) | |
| 13 January 2025 | CF | Sandro Da Costa (ENG) | Bamber Bridge (ENG) | 10 February 2025 | |
| 18 January 2025 | LM | Ben Collins (ENG) | Flint Town United (WAL) | End of Season | |
| 1 February 2025 | CF | Junior Luamba (COD) | York City (ENG) | End of Season | |
| 21 February 2025 | CM | Alfie Henderson (ENG) | Witton Albion (ENG) | 30 April 2025 (Note: On 24 March, Henderson's loan at Witton was extended by a further month) | |
| 27 March 2025 | CM | Jai Curran-Nicholls (ENG) | Southport (ENG) | End of Season | |
| 28 March 2025 | CM | Alfie Bairstow (ENG) | Hyde United (ENG) | 12 April 2025 | |
| 28 March 2025 | CF | Sandro Da Costa (ENG) | Hyde United (ENG) | End of Season | |
| 28 March 2025 | CM | Harry Showman (ENG) | Hyde United (ENG) | 12 April 2025 | |
| 31 March 2025 | CM | Jez Davies (ENG) | Welling United (ENG) | End of Season | |

=== Released / Out of Contract ===
| Date | Pos. | Player | Subsequent club | Join date | Ref. |
|---|---|---|---|---|---|
| 30 June 2024 | CB | Adrian Mariappa (JAM) | Wealdstone (ENG) | 1 July 2024 | |
| 30 June 2024 | CF | Djavan Pedro (ENG) | Buxton (ENG) | 1 July 2024 | |
| 30 June 2024 | GK | Joel Torrance (ENG) | Bala Town (WAL) | 1 July 2024 | |
| 30 June 2024 | DM | Elliot Watt (SCO) | Burton Albion (ENG) | 1 July 2024 | |
| 30 June 2024 | CB | Theo Vassell (ENG) | Barrow (ENG) | 14 July 2024 | |
| 30 June 2024 | CM | Stevie Mallan (SCO) | | | |
| 30 June 2024 | RW | Connor McLennan (SCO) | Ayr United (SCO) | 11 October 2024 | |
| 30 June 2024 | CF | Matt Smith (ENG) | Retired | | |

== Pre-season and friendlies ==
On 21 May, Salford City announced their first two pre-season friendlies, against FC United of Manchester and Altrincham. Three days later, an additional two more were added to City's pre-season plans, Warrington Town and Rochdale. A fifth friendly was confirmed on May 28, versus Bamber Bridge. Three days later, a journey across the Irish Sea was announced for a friendly against Crusaders. Two home friendlies against Everton and Preston North End were also confirmed.

Win Draw Loss Fixtures

| 7 July 2024 Friendly | Crusaders | 1–3 | Salford City | Belfast, Northern Ireland |
| 15:00 BST | Kennedy 89' | | Luamba 9' McAleny 52' Dackers 68' | Stadium: Seaview |

| 19 July 2024 Friendly | Bamber Bridge | 1–2 | Salford City | Bamber Bridge |
| 19:45 BST | Baxter 72' | Report | Luamba 15'; Stockton 89' (pen.) | Stadium: Sir Tom Finney Stadium; Attendance: 197 |

| 20 July 2024 Friendly | FC United of Manchester | 2–2 | Salford City | Moston |
| 15:00 BST | J.Palinkas 11'; Rawsthorn 32' | Report | Malcolm 16' , 58' | Stadium: Broadhurst Park; Attendance: 1,018 |

| 23 July 2024 Friendly | Altrincham | 1–1 | Salford City | Altrincham |
| 19:45 BST | Amaluzor 30' | | N'Mai 25' | Stadium: Moss Lane |

| 24 July 2024 Friendly | Warrington Town | 1–3 | Salford City | Warrington |
| 19:45 BST | Trialist 77' | | Dackers 20' , 36'; Malcolm 71' | Stadium: Cantilever Park |

| 27 July 2024 Friendly | Salford City | 2-1 | Everton | Kersal |
| 15:00 BST | Woodburn 69'; Chesters 87' | | Garner 50' | Stadium: Moor Lane; Attendance: 4,217 |

| 30 July 2024 Friendly | Salford City | 0–2 | Preston North End | Kersal |
| 19:30 BST | | | Brady 45'; Osmajić 85' | Stadium: Moor Lane |

| 3 August 2024 Friendly | Rochdale | 5–2 | Salford City | Rochdale |
| 15:00 BST | Mitchell 15' , 26' Henry 32'; Rodney 47' McBride 89' | | Ashley 3'; Dackers 52' | Stadium: Spotland Stadium |

== Competitions ==
=== League Two ===
==== League table ====
| Pos | Team | Pld | W | D | L | GF | GA | GD | Pts | Promotion, qualification or relegation |
|---|---|---|---|---|---|---|---|---|---|---|
| 6 | Notts County | 46 | 20 | 12 | 14 | 68 | 49 | +19 | 72 | Qualification for League Two play-offs |
| 7 | Chesterfield | 46 | 19 | 13 | 14 | 73 | 54 | +19 | 70 | Qualification for League Two play-offs |
| 8 | Salford City | 46 | 18 | 15 | 13 | 64 | 54 | +10 | 69 | |
| 9 | Grimsby Town | 46 | 20 | 8 | 18 | 61 | 67 | −6 | 68 | |
| 10 | Colchester United | 46 | 16 | 19 | 11 | 52 | 47 | +5 | 67 | |

Source: EFL Official Website
Rules for classification: 1) Points; 2) Goal difference; 3) Number of goals scored; 4) Head-to-head results; 5) Wins; 6) Away goals; 7) Penalty points (sec 9.5); 8) 12-point sending off offences

==== Results summary ====
| Overall | | | | | | | | Home | | | | | | Away | | | | | |
| Pld | W | D | L | GF | GA | GD | Pts | W | D | L | GF | GA | GD | W | D | L | GF | GA | GD |
|---|---|---|---|---|---|---|---|---|---|---|---|---|---|---|---|---|---|---|---|
| 45 | 18 | 14 | 13 | 62 | 52 | +10 | 68 | 10 | 5 | 8 | 32 | 28 | +4 | 8 | 9 | 5 | 30 | 24 | +6 |

Last updated: 26 April 2025.
Source: Soccerway

==== Results by round ====
| Round | 1 | 2 | 3 | 4 | 6 | 7 | 8 | 9 | 10 | 11 | 12 | 13 | 14 | 5^{1} | 15 | 16 | 18 | 19 | 20 | 21 | 22 | 23 | 24 | 25 | 26 | 27 | 28 | 29 | 30 | 17^{2} | 31 | 32 | 33 | 34 | 35 | 36 | 37 | 39 | 40 | 41 | 42 | 38^{4} | 43 | 44 | 45 |
|---|---|---|---|---|---|---|---|---|---|---|---|---|---|---|---|---|---|---|---|---|---|---|---|---|---|---|---|---|---|---|---|---|---|---|---|---|---|---|---|---|---|---|---|---|---|
| Ground | H | A | A | H | H | H | A | A | H | H | A | H | A | A | H | A | H | A | H | A | H | H | A | A | H | H | A | H | A | H | H | A | A | H | A | H | A | A | A | H | A | H | H | A | H |
| Result | L | D | D | W | W | L | D | L | W | L | D | W | W | D | L | D | W | L | W | W | W | W | W | W | P | L | L | D | D | D | W | L | L | L | D | D | W | W | D | D | W | D | L | W | W |
| Position | 22 | 20 | 20 | 14 | 13 | 15 | 20 | 20 | 15 | 16 | 18 | 15 | 13 | 12 | 13 | 14 | 11 | 12 | 12 | 11 | 9 | 8 | 4 | 3 | — | 7 | 8 | 8 | 8 | 8 | 7 | 8 | 8 | 9 | 11 | 11 | 10 | 10 | 10 | 11 | 10 | 10 | 10 | 9 | 7 |
| Points | 0 | 1 | 2 | 5 | 8 | 8 | 9 | 9 | 12 | 12 | 13 | 16 | 19 | 20 | 20 | 21 | 24 | 24 | 27 | 30 | 33 | 36 | 39 | 42 | — | 42 | 42 | 43 | 44 | 45 | 48 | 48 | 48 | 48 | 49 | 50 | 53 | 56 | 57 | 58 | 61 | 62 | 62 | 65 | 68 |

Source: EFL
A = Away; H = Home; W = Win; D = Draw; L = Loss; P = Postponed
Notes:
- ^{1} Matchday 5 (vs. Fleetwood Town) was postponed due to international call-ups.
- ^{2} Matchday 17 (vs. Bromley) was postponed due to a waterlogged pitch.
- ^{3} Matchday 26 (vs. Cheltenham Town) was postponed due to FA Cup involvements.
- ^{4} Matchday 38 (vs. Doncaster Rovers) was postponed due to international call-ups.

==== Matches ====
On 26 June, the League Two fixtures were announced.

Win Draw Loss Fixtures

| 10 August 2024 1 | Salford City | 0–2 | Port Vale | Kersal |
| 15:00 BST | Tilt (yellow card) 34'; Olopade (yellow card) 39' | Report | Garrity (yellow card) 38' (goal) 45+3', 69'; Tolaj (yellow card) 45+5' | Stadium: Moor Lane; Attendance: 3318; Referee: Martin Woods |

| 17 August 2024 2 | Bradford City | 0–0 | Salford City | Bradford |
| 15:00 BST | Byrne (yellow card) 36'; Cook (yellow card) 90+3' | Report | Woodburn (yellow card) 31'; Fornah (yellow card) 62'; Chesters (yellow card) 70'; Garbutt (yellow card) 90+2' | Stadium: Valley Parade; Attendance: 16,183; Referee: Geoff Eltringham |

| 24 August 2024 3 | Chesterfield | 1–1 | Salford City | Chesterfield |
| 15:00 BST | Banks (yellow card) 63'; Berry 69'; Naylor (yellow card) 90' | Report | Woodburn (yellow card) 45+4'; Taylor (yellow card) 56'; Austerfield (yellow card) 62'; Fornah (yellow card) 63'; Garbutt (yellow card) 67'; Tilt (yellow card) 71' (yellow-red card) 71'; N'Mai 86' | Stadium: SMH Group Stadium; Attendance: 8,334; Referee: Richie Watkins |

| 2 September 2024 4 | Salford City | 1–0 | Milton Keynes Dons | Kersal |
| 20:00 BST | Okoronkwo 42'; Edwards (yellow card) 60' | Report | | Stadium: Moor Lane; Attendance: 2,227; Referee: Ben Speedie |
Note: Fixture was initially scheduled for 31 August, but was moved for live Sky Sports broadcast.

| 14 September 2024 6 | Salford City | 2–1 | Cheltenham Town | Kersal |
| 15:00 BST | Adelakun 60', 86'; Chesters (yellow card) 90+2' | Report | Archer 48' | Stadium: Moor Lane; Attendance: 2,347; Referee: Farai Hallam |

| 21 September 2024 7 | Salford City | 0–2 | Walsall | Kersal |
| 15:00 BST | Garbutt (yellow card) 31' | Report | Lowe 51'; Lakin 57'; Allen (yellow card) 38'; Lakin (yellow card) 65'; Gordon (yellow card) 86'; Williams (yellow card) 90+5' | Stadium: Moor Lane; Attendance: 2,860; Referee: Declan Bourne |

| 27 September 2024 8 | Tranmere Rovers | 0–0 | Salford City | Birkenhead |
| 19:45 BST | Norris (yellow card) 30'; Turnbull (yellow card) 66'; Khan (yellow card) 89' | Report | N'Mai (yellow card) 19'; Tilt (yellow card) 30'; Mnoga (yellow card) 56'; Kouassi (yellow card) 66'; Fornah (yellow card) 67'; Ashley (yellow card) 90+6'; Okoronkwo (yellow card) 90+10' | Stadium: Prenton Park; Referee: Edward Duckworth |
Note: Fixture was initially scheduled for 28 September, but was moved following an agreement between both sides.

| 1 October 2024 9 | Newport County | 3–1 | Salford City | Newport |
| 19:45 BST | Hudlin 10'; Wildig 26'; Spellman 67', (yellow card) 83' | Report | McAleny (yellow card) 9'; Tilt (yellow card) 57'; N'Mai (yellow card) 61'; Woodburn (yellow card) 77'; Stockton 81' | Stadium: Rodney Parade; Attendance: 3,552; Referee: Scott Jackson |

| 5 October 2024 10 | Salford City | 1–0 | AFC Wimbledon | Kersal |
| 15:00 BST | Garbutt (yellow card) 48'; N'Mai (yellow card) 51'; Ashley (yellow card) 71'; Kouassi (yellow card) 80'; Luamba 84' | Report | Neufville (yellow card) 12'; Harbottle (yellow card) 39'; Hippolyte (yellow card) 51'; Furlong (yellow card) 62' | Stadium: Moor Lane; Attendance: 2,627; Referee: Scott Simpson |

| 12 October 2024 11 | Salford City | 1–2 | Grimsby Town | Kersal |
| 15:00 BST | Mnoga (yellow card) 8'; Stockton 15'; McAleny (yellow card) 30'; Austerfield (yellow card) 73' | Report | Barrington 1', 45+1'; Cass (yellow card) 39'; McJannet (yellow card) 81'; Khouri (yellow card) 88'; Carson (yellow card) 90+5' | Stadium: Moor Lane; Attendance: 3,608; Referee: Jacob Miles |

| 19 October 2024 12 | Crewe Alexandra | 1–1 | Salford City | Crewe |
| 15:00 BST | Cooney 26' | Report | Woodburn 12', (yellow card) 60'; Fornah (yellow card) 39'; Lund (yellow card) 85' | Stadium: Gresty Road; Attendance: 4,936; Referee: Sunny Singh Gill |

| 22 October 2024 13 | Salford City | 2–1 | Swindon Town | Kersal |
| 19:45 BST | N'Mai 3'; Edwards (yellow card) 15'; Taylor 69'; Kouassi (yellow card) 76' | Report | Cox (yellow card) 39'; Smith 50' | Stadium: Moor Lane; Attendance: 2,145; Referee: Darren Drysdale |

| 26 October 2024 14 | Colchester United | 1–2 | Salford City | Colchester |
| 12:30 BST | Anderson 70' | Report | N'Mai 61'; Kouassi 76' | Stadium: Colchester Community Stadium; Attendance: 3,936; Referee: Alex Chilowicz |
Note: Fixture was initially scheduled for a 15:00 kick-off, but was for live Sky Sports broadcast.

| 29 October 2024 5 | Fleetwood Town | 2–2 | Salford City | Fleetwood |
| 19:45 GMT | Potter (yellow card) 30'; Coughlan 33'; Bonds (yellow card) 59'; Helm 61'; Virtue (yellow card) 90' | Report | Negru (yellow card) 5'; Woodburn 18', (yellow card) 68'; Kouassi (yellow card) 26'; Taylor (yellow card) 28'; N'Mai (yellow card) 55'; Tilt (yellow card) 90+4'; Okoronkwo 90+8' | Stadium: Highbury Stadium; Attendance: 2,549; Referee: Michael Salisbury |
Note: Fixture was originally scheduled for 7 September, but was postponed due to international call-ups in the Fleetwood squad.

| 9 November 2024 15 | Salford City | 0–1 | Carlisle United | Kersal |
| 12:30 GMT | Mnoga (yellow card) 57'; Austerfield (yellow card) 74'; Jones (yellow card) 89' | Report | Adu-Adjei (yellow card) 28'; Neal (yellow card) 69'; Barclay 88' | Stadium: Moor Lane; Attendance: 3,737; Referee: Ross Joyce |
Note: Fixture was initially scheduled for a 15:00 kick-off, but was for live Sky Sports broadcast.

| 16 November 2024 16 | Doncaster Rovers | 1–1 | Salford City | Doncaster |
| 15:00 GMT | Sharman-Lowe (yellow card) 23'; Bailey (yellow card) 38'; Hurst (yellow card) 49'; Sharp 77' | Report | N'Mai (yellow card) 23'; Ashley (yellow card) 42'; Kouassi 50' | Stadium: Eco-Power Stadium; Attendance: 7,280; Referee: Martin Woods |

| 3 December 2024 18 | Salford City | 2–0 | Harrogate Town | Kersal |
| 19:45 GMT | Woodburn 10'; Stockton 72'; Mnoga (yellow card) 80'; Ashley (yellow card) 87' | Report | Cornelius (yellow card) 26'; Sims (yellow card) 33' | Stadium: Moor Lane; Attendance: 1,838; Referee: Michael Barlow |

| 7 December 2024 19 | Gillingham | 1–0 | Salford City | Gillingham |
| 15:00 GMT | Clarke 48', (yellow card) 73'; McKenzie (yellow card) 90+1' | Report | Lund (yellow card) 25'; Tilt (yellow card) 73' | Stadium: Priestfield Stadium; Attendance: 5,296; Referee: Tom Nield |

| 14 December 2024 20 | Salford City | 3–0 | Notts County | Kersal |
| 12:30 GMT | McAleny 14'; Stockton 31', 54'; N'Mai (yellow card) 47' | Report | Bedeau (yellow card) 86'; Jatta (yellow card) 90+2' | Stadium: Moor Lane; Attendance: 2,768; Referee: Paul Howard |
Note: Fixture was initially scheduled for a 15:00 kick-off, but was for live Sky Sports broadcast.

| 21 December 2024 21 | Accrington Stanley | 0–2 | Salford City | Accrington |
| 15:00 GMT | Love (yellow card) 39'; Woods (yellow card) 72' | Report | N'Mai (yellow card) 45+1'; Mnoga 48'; Ashley (yellow card) 72'; Young (yellow card) 79'; Stockton 85'; Taylor (yellow card) 90+4' | Stadium: Crown Ground; Attendance: 2,350; Referee: Scott Jackson |

| 26 December 2024 22 | Salford City | 3–0 | Barrow | Kersal |
| 15:00 GMT | Stockton (yellow card) 9'; Garbutt 21'; Fornah 33', (yellow card) 37'; Ashley (yellow card) 73'; Kouassi 80' | Report | Feely (yellow card) 37'; Popov (yellow card) 73' | Stadium: Moor Lane; Attendance: 2,983; Referee: Elliot Bell |

| 29 December 2024 23 | Salford City | 1–0 | Morecambe | Kersal |
| 15:00 GMT | Ashley (yellow card) 45+1'; Lund 47' | Report | Williams (yellow card) 16' | Stadium: Moor Lane; Attendance: 3,179; Referee: Dale Baines |

| 1 January 2025 24 | Harrogate Town | 0–2 | Salford City | Harrogate |
| 15:00 GMT | March (yellow card) 56'; Sutton (yellow card) 90+4' | Report | Stockton 39'; Mnoga (yellow card) 45+3'; Lund 56'; Ashley (yellow card) 78' | Stadium: Wetherby Road; Attendance: 2,814; Referee: Scott Oldham |

| 4 January 2025 25 | Milton Keynes Dons | 0–1 | Salford City | Denbigh |
| 15:00 GMT | | Report | Adelakun 34'; Ashley (yellow card) 50'; Tilt (yellow card) 52'; Watson (yellow card) 69'; Shephard (yellow card) 78' | Stadium: Stadium MK; Attendance: 5,934; Referee: Matthew Russell |

| 18 January 2025 27 | Salford City | 0–2 | Fleetwood Town | Kersal |
| 15:00 GMT | Lund (yellow card) 18'; Fornah (yellow card) 45+1'; Kouassi (yellow card) 62' (yellow-red card) 85' | Report | Coughlan 2'; Sarpong-Wiredu 11'; Bennett (yellow card) 85' | Stadium: Moor Lane; Attendance: 3,216; Referee: David Rock |

| 25 January 2025 28 | Cheltenham Town | 2–1 | Salford City | Cheltenham |
| 15:00 GMT | Backwell 31'; Day (yellow card) 41'; Thomas 80' | Report | Shephard (yellow card) 48'; Stockton (yellow card) 90'; Tilt 90+5' | Stadium: Whaddon Road; Attendance: 4,187; Referee: Anthony Backhouse |

| 28 January 2025 29 | Salford City | 1–1 | Newport County | Kersal |
| 19:45 GMT | Fornah (yellow card) 4' (yellow-red card) 75'; Adelakun 31' (pen.) | Report | McLoughlin 11' (pen.); Evans (yellow card) 48'; Antwi (yellow card) 67' | Stadium: Moor Lane; Attendance: 1,952; Referee: Scott Simpson |

| 1 February 2025 30 | Walsall | 2–2 | Salford City | Bescot |
| 15:00 GMT | | Report | | Stadium: Bescot Stadium |

| 4 February 2025 17 | Salford City | 3–3 | Bromley | Kersal |
| 19:45 GMT | Warrington 62', (yellow card) 82'; Lund 77'; Stockton 90+2' | Report | Congreve 13', 51'; Mayor (yellow card) 16'; Cheek 38'; Imray (yellow card) 45+1'; Arthurs (yellow card) 90+5' | Stadium: Moor Lane; Attendance: 2,112; Referee: Simon Mather |
Note: Fixture was originally scheduled for 23 November, but was postponed due to a waterlogged pitch.

| 8 February 2025 31 | Salford City | 2–0 | Tranmere Rovers | Kersal |
| 15:00 GMT | Mnoga (yellow card) 19'; Warrington (yellow card) 27'; Adelakun 51', 61' | Report | Garrett (yellow card) 37'; Davies (yellow card) 45+1' | Stadium: Moor Lane; Attendance: 3,097; Referee: Matthew Corlett |

| 15 February 2025 32 | AFC Wimbledon | 1–0 | Salford City | Wimbledon |
| 12:30 GMT | Smith (yellow card) 11'; Stevens 65'; Bugiel (yellow card) 70'; Browne (yellow card) 77'; Kelly (yellow card) 90+5' | Report | Fornah (yellow card) 24'; Garbutt (yellow card) 72'; Taylor (yellow card) 83' | Stadium: Plough Lane; Attendance: 7,739; Referee: Alan Young |
Note: Fixture was initially scheduled for a 15:00 kick-off, but was moved for live Sky Sports broadcasting.

| 22 February 2025 33 | Port Vale | 2–1 | Salford City | Burslem |
| 15:00 GMT | Hackford 43'; Harper 52' | | Adelakun 19' (pen.) | Stadium: Vale Park |

| 1 March 2025 34 | Salford City | 1–2 | Bradford City | Kersal |
| 12:30 GMT | Okoronkwo 30'; Mnoga (yellow card) 35'; Lund (yellow card) 60' | Report | Halliday 71'; Mellon 90+4', (yellow card) 90+5' | Stadium: Moor Lane; Attendance: 3,656; Referee: Martin Coy |
Note: Fixture was initially scheduled for a 15:00 kick-off, but was moved for live Sky Sports broadcasting.

| 4 March 2025 35 | Swindon Town | 2–2 | Salford City | Swindon |
| 19:45 GMT | Nichols 7'; Smith 71' | Report | Adelakun 27'; N'Mai 72'; Mnoga (yellow card) 74' | Stadium: County Ground; Attendance: 6,465; Referee: Stephen Parkinson |

| 8 March 2025 36 | Salford City | 1–1 | Crewe Alexandra | Kersal |
| 15:00 GMT | Ashley (yellow card) 65'; N'Mai 68'; Garbutt (yellow card) 88'; Longelo (yellow card) 90+4'; Edwards (yellow card) 90+4' | Report | Lowery (yellow card) 64'; O'Riordan 79'; Thomas (yellow card) 81'; Billington (yellow card) 81'; Holíček (yellow card) 90+4' | Stadium: Moor Lane; Attendance: 3,524; Referee: Zac Kennard-Kettle |

| 11 March 2025 26 | Salford City | 0–4 | Chesterfield | Kersal |
| 19:45 GMT | Adelakun (red card); Lund (yellow card) 73' | Report | Mandeville 40', 90+6'; Pepple 43'; Dobra 59' | Stadium: Moor Lane; Attendance: 2,289; Referee: Darren Drysdale |
Note: Fixture was initially scheduled for 11 January, but was moved due to Salford's involvement in the FA Cup.

| 15 March 2025 37 | Grimsby Town | 0–1 | Salford City | Cleethorpes |
| 15:00 GMT | | | | Stadium: Blundell Park |

| 29 March 2025 39 | Bromley | 2–3 | Salford City | Bromley |
| 15:00 GMT | Ashley 8' (o.g.); Smith (yellow card) 34'; Cheek 74', (yellow card) 90+2' | Report | Ashley (yellow card) 7'; Stockton 16', 62'; N'Mai 28', (yellow card) 72'; Lund (yellow card) 87' | Stadium: Hayes Lane; Attendance: 2,658; Referee: Aaron Bannister |

| 1 April 2025 40 | Barrow | 1–1 | Salford City | Barrow-in-Furness |
| 19:45 BST | | Report | | Stadium: Holker Street |

| 5 April 2025 41 | Salford City | 2–2 | Gillingham | Kersal |
| 15:00 BST | Stockton 8', (yellow card) 90+3'; N'Mai 15', (yellow card) 45+3'; Garbutt (yellow card) 73' | Report | Nevitt 2', (yellow card) 90'; McKenzie (yellow card) 10'; Hutton 24', (yellow card) 55'; Little (yellow card) 65' | Stadium: Moor Lane; Attendance: 2,914; Referee: Will Finnie |

| 11 April 2025 42 | Notts County | 1–3 | Salford City | Nottingham |
| 19:45 BST | McGoldrick 67'; Palmer (yellow card) 90+2' | Report | Platt 45+1' (o.g.); N'Mai 53'; Garbutt 77' | Stadium: Meadow Lane; Attendance: 9,643; Referee: Alex Chilowicz |
Note: Fixture was initially scheduled for 12 April, but was moved to avoid a clash with Nottingham Forest.

| 15 April 2025 38 | Salford City | 1–1 | Doncaster Rovers | Kersal |
| 19:45 BST | Garbutt (yellow card) 19', (goal) 27'; Tilt (yellow card) 22' (yellow-red card) 90+4'; Woodburn (yellow card) 45+1'; Lund (yellow card) 65' | Report | Street 21'; Anderson (yellow card) 26'; Maxwell (yellow card) 75' | Stadium: Moor Lane; Attendance: 3,030; Referee: Elliot Bell |
Note: Fixture was initially scheduled for 22 March, but was postponed due to international call-ups within the Doncaster squad.

| 18 April 2025 43 | Salford City | 1–2 | Accrington Stanley | Kersal |
| 15:00 BST | Mnoga (yellow card) 61'; Adelakun 70' (pen.); N'Mai (yellow card) 74'; Ashley (yellow card) 83' | Report | Walton (yellow card) 15'; Whalley 36', (yellow card) 87'; Woods 62'; Kelly (yellow card) 90+3' | Stadium: Moor Lane; Attendance: 2,945; Referee: Lee Swabey |

| 21 April 2025 44 | Morecambe | 1–3 | Salford City | Morecambe |
| 15:00 BST | Songo'o 52', (yellow card) 66'; Lewis (yellow card) 58'; White (yellow card) 67'; Fairclough (yellow card) 90+3' | Report | Ashley 3'; Stockton 41'; N'Mai 86' | Stadium: Mazuma Mobile Stadium; Attendance: 3,027; Referee: Benjamin Speedie |

| 26 April 2025 45 | Salford City | 4–1 | Colchester United | Kersal |
| 15:00 BST | Adelakun 2' (pen.), 56' (pen.); Shephard 21'; Stockton 24'; Woodburn (yellow card) 46'; Ashley (yellow card) 68'; Garbutt (yellow card) 75'; N'Mai (yellow card) 89' | Report | Kelleher (yellow card) 1'; Iandolo 66'; Read (yellow card) 90+2' | Stadium: Moor Lane; Attendance: 3,150; Referee: Seb Stockbridge |

| 3 May 2025 46 | Carlisle United | 2–2 | Salford City | Carlisle |
| 15:00 BST | Wearne 16'; Dennis 17'; Thomas (yellow card) 71'; Kelly (yellow card) 90' | Report | Stockton 36'; Adelakun 62' | Stadium: Brunton Park; Attendance: 8,128; Referee: Simon Mather |

=== FA Cup ===
Salford City were drawn at home to Shrewsbury Town in the first round and then to Cheltenham Town in the second round. Then away to Manchester City in the third round.

Win Draw Loss Fixtures

| 2 November 2024 First round | Salford City | 2–1 | Shrewsbury Town | Kersal |
| 15:00 GMT | Lund 5', 42'; Mnoga (yellow card) 16'; Ashley (yellow card) 45+1' | Report | Marquis 15' | Stadium: Moor Lane; Attendance: 2,374; Referee: Leigh Doughty |

| 30 November 2024 Second round | Salford City | 2–0 | Cheltenham Town | Kersal |
| 15:00 GMT | Okoronkwo 20'; Stockton 22' (pen.); Taylor (yellow card) 24'; Lund (yellow card) 52'; Austerfield (yellow card) 56'; N'Mai (yellow card) 74' | Report | Taylor (penalty missed) 70'; Stubbs (yellow card) 86'; Jude-Boyd (yellow card) 90+10' | Stadium: Moor Lane; Attendance: 1,968; Referee: Martin Coy |

| 11 January 2025 Third round | Manchester City | 8–0 | Salford City | Manchester |
| 17:45 GMT | Doku 8', 69' (pen.); Mubama 20'; O'Reilly 43'; Grealish 49' (pen.); McAtee 62', 72', 81' | Report | Shephard (yellow card) 21'; Tilt (yellow card) 60' | Stadium: City of Manchester Stadium; Referee: Josh Smith |

=== EFL Cup ===
On 27 June, the draw for the first round was made, with Salford being drawn at home against Doncaster Rovers.

Win Draw Loss Fixtures

| 13 August 2024 First round | Salford City | 0–2 | Doncaster Rovers | Salford |
| 19:45 BST | Chesters (yellow card) 39'; Chester (yellow card) 62'; Negru (yellow card) 83'; N'Mai (yellow card) 90+2'; Edwards (yellow card) 90+5' | Report | Sharp 21'; Senior (yellow card) 59'; Yeboah (yellow card) 70'; Molyneux 90+1' | Stadium: Moor Lane; Attendance: 1,328; Referee: Seb Stockbridge |

=== EFL Trophy ===
In the group stage, Salford were drawn into Northern Group B alongside Port Vale, Wrexham and Wolverhampton Wanderers U21.

| Pos | Div | Team | Pld | W | PW | PL | L | GF | GA | GD | Pts | Qualification |
|---|---|---|---|---|---|---|---|---|---|---|---|---|
| 1 | L1 | Wrexham | 3 | 2 | 0 | 1 | 0 | 6 | 2 | +4 | 7 | Advance to Round 2 |
| 2 | L2 | Port Vale | 3 | 1 | 2 | 0 | 0 | 5 | 3 | +2 | 7 | Advance to Round 2 |
| 3 | L2 | Salford City | 3 | 1 | 0 | 0 | 2 | 4 | 6 | −2 | 3 | |
| 4 | ACA | Wolverhampton Wanderers U21 | 3 | 0 | 0 | 1 | 2 | 4 | 8 | −4 | 1 | |

Source: EFL

Win Draw Loss Fixtures

| 20 August 2024 Group stage | Salford City | 0–2 | Port Vale | Kersal |
| 19:00 BST | | Report | Edwards 50'; Paton 71' | Stadium: Moor Lane; Attendance: 693; Referee: Ruebyn Ricardo |

| 10 September 2024 Group stage | Wrexham | 2–1 | Salford City | Wrexham |
| 19:30 BST | Mullin 18'; Faal (yellow card) 25'; Bolton (yellow card) 35'; Austerfield 83' (o.g.) | Report | McAleny 52'; Taylor (yellow card) 55' | Stadium: Racecourse Ground; Attendance: 6,640; Referee: Dale Baines |

| 12 November 2024 Group stage | Salford City | 3–2 | Wolverhampton Wanderers U21 | Kersal |
| 19:00 GMT | Davies 8', 67'; Stockton 11'; Luamba (yellow card) 32'; Malcolm (yellow card) 66'; Butt (yellow card) 89'; Young (yellow card) 90+8' | Report | Voice (yellow card) 27', (goal) 42'; Bradbury (yellow card) 50'; Holman (penalty missed) 66'; Barnett (penalty missed) 90+3', 90+3' | Stadium: Moor Lane; Attendance: 503; Referee: Stuart Morland |

== Statistics ==
=== Appearances and goals ===
As of match played 26 April 2025

Players with no appearances are not included on the list
Italics indicate a loaned in player

| No. | Pos | Nat | Player | Total | | League Two | | FA Cup | | EFL Cup | | EFL Trophy | |
| No. | Pos | Nat | Player | Apps | Goals | Apps | Goals | Apps | Goals | Apps | Goals | Apps | Goals |
|---|---|---|---|---|---|---|---|---|---|---|---|---|---|
| 1 | GK | (England) ENG | Jamie Jones | 26 | 0 | 26+0 | 0 | 0+0 | 0 | 0+0 | 0 | 0+0 | 0 |
| 2 | DF | (England) ENG | Tom Edwards | 24 | 0 | 10+9 | 0 | 1+0 | 0 | 1+0 | 0 | 2+1 | 0 |
| 3 | DF | (England) ENG | Kevin Berkoe | 18 | 0 | 8+7 | 0 | 1+1 | 0 | 0+0 | 0 | 1+0 | 0 |
| 4 | MF | (England) ENG | Ossama Ashley | 35 | 1 | 30+2 | 1 | 2+1 | 0 | 0+0 | 0 | 0+0 | 0 |
| 5 | DF | (Republic of Ireland) IRL | Stephan Negru | 32 | 0 | 26+4 | 0 | 0+0 | 0 | 0+1 | 0 | 1+0 | 0 |
| 6 | MF | (Sierra Leone) SLE | Tyrese Fornah | 42 | 1 | 38+1 | 1 | 2+1 | 0 | 0+0 | 0 | 0+0 | 0 |
| 7 | MF | (England) ENG | Ryan Watson | 20 | 0 | 8+10 | 0 | 0+1 | 0 | 0+0 | 0 | 1+0 | 0 |
| 8 | MF | (Northern Ireland) NIR | Matty Lund | 42 | 6 | 14+22 | 4 | 3+0 | 2 | 1+0 | 0 | 2+0 | 0 |
| 9 | FW | (England) ENG | Cole Stockton | 42 | 16 | 31+6 | 14 | 1+1 | 1 | 0+1 | 0 | 1+1 | 1 |
| 10 | MF | (Netherlands) NED | Kelly N'Mai | 36 | 9 | 27+4 | 9 | 2+0 | 0 | 0+1 | 0 | 1+1 | 0 |
| 11 | MF | (England) ENG | Jon Taylor | 32 | 1 | 13+15 | 1 | 1+1 | 0 | 0+0 | 0 | 2+0 | 0 |
| 13 | GK | (England) ENG | Matty Young | 26 | 0 | 19+0 | 0 | 3+0 | 0 | 1+0 | 0 | 3+0 | 0 |
| 14 | MF | (Wales) WAL | Ben Woodburn | 34 | 3 | 26+6 | 3 | 0+0 | 0 | 1+0 | 0 | 0+1 | 0 |
| 16 | DF | (Jamaica) JAM | Curtis Tilt | 40 | 1 | 31+5 | 1 | 3+0 | 0 | 1+0 | 0 | 0+0 | 0 |
| 17 | DF | (Wales) WAL | James Chester | 2 | 0 | 0+0 | 0 | 0+0 | 0 | 1+0 | 0 | 1+0 | 0 |
| 18 | FW | (England) ENG | Conor McAleny | 32 | 2 | 11+15 | 1 | 0+2 | 0 | 0+1 | 0 | 3+0 | 1 |
| 19 | DF | (Tanzania) TAN | Haji Mnoga | 41 | 1 | 32+6 | 1 | 2+0 | 0 | 0+0 | 0 | 1+0 | 0 |
| 20 | MF | (England) ENG | Daniel Chesters | 9 | 0 | 5+2 | 0 | 0+0 | 0 | 1+0 | 0 | 1+0 | 0 |
| 21 | MF | (England) ENG | Jez Davies | 3 | 2 | 0+0 | 0 | 0+0 | 0 | 1+0 | 0 | 1+1 | 2 |
| 22 | FW | (Democratic Republic of the Congo) COD | Junior Luamba | 14 | 1 | 3+7 | 1 | 0+0 | 0 | 1+0 | 0 | 1+2 | 0 |
| 23 | FW | (England) ENG | Kyrell Malcolm | 6 | 0 | 0+2 | 0 | 1+0 | 0 | 0+1 | 0 | 2+0 | 0 |
| 24 | DF | (Republic of Ireland) IRL | Tosin Olopade | 2 | 0 | 1+0 | 0 | 0+0 | 0 | 0+0 | 0 | 0+1 | 0 |
| 25 | DF | (England) ENG | Rosaire Longelo | 16 | 0 | 8+8 | 0 | 0+0 | 0 | 0+0 | 0 | 0+0 | 0 |
| 27 | FW | (England) ENG | Kylian Kouassi | 31 | 3 | 16+11 | 3 | 2+1 | 0 | 0+0 | 0 | 1+0 | 0 |
| 28 | MF | (England) ENG | Lewis Warrington | 15 | 1 | 8+7 | 1 | 0+0 | 0 | 0+0 | 0 | 0+0 | 0 |
| 29 | DF | (England) ENG | Luke Garbutt | 45 | 3 | 39+1 | 3 | 3+0 | 0 | 1+0 | 0 | 1+0 | 0 |
| 31 | FW | (England) ENG | Hakeeb Adelakun | 31 | 12 | 22+7 | 12 | 1+0 | 0 | 0+0 | 0 | 0+1 | 0 |
| 32 | DF | (Wales) WAL | Liam Shephard | 26 | 1 | 19+2 | 1 | 2+1 | 0 | 0+0 | 0 | 2+0 | 0 |
| 33 | MF | (England) ENG | Josh Austerfield | 24 | 0 | 12+8 | 0 | 2+0 | 0 | 0+0 | 0 | 2+0 | 0 |
| 35 | FW | (Canada) CAN | Robbie Cleary | 2 | 0 | 0+0 | 0 | 0+0 | 0 | 0+0 | 0 | 1+1 | 0 |
| 36 | FW | (Wales) WAL | Marcus Dackers | 5 | 0 | 0+3 | 0 | 0+0 | 0 | 1+0 | 0 | 1+0 | 0 |
| 37 | FW | (England) ENG | Francis Okoronkwo | 24 | 4 | 11+11 | 3 | 1+1 | 1 | 0+0 | 0 | 0+0 | 0 |
| 40 | MF | (England) ENG | Jai Curran-Nicholls | 1 | 0 | 0+1 | 0 | 0+0 | 0 | 0+0 | 0 | 0+0 | 0 |
| 42 | MF | (England) ENG | Marshall Heys | 2 | 0 | 0+0 | 0 | 0+1 | 0 | 0+0 | 0 | 0+1 | 0 |
| 43 | MF | (England) ENG | Bruno Padovani | 1 | 0 | 0+0 | 0 | 0+0 | 0 | 0+0 | 0 | 0+1 | 0 |
| 44 | DF | (England) ENG | Will Wright | 4 | 0 | 0+2 | 0 | 0+1 | 0 | 0+0 | 0 | 0+1 | 0 |
| 46 | MF | (England) ENG | Ruben Butt | 1 | 0 | 0+0 | 0 | 0+0 | 0 | 0+0 | 0 | 0+1 | 0 |
| 47 | MF | (England) ENG | Liam Humbles | 3 | 0 | 1+0 | 0 | 0+0 | 0 | 0+0 | 0 | 1+1 | 0 |
