= Kelly N'Mai =

English footballer

Personal information
- Full name: Kelly Harmani N'Mai
- Date of birth: 1 May 2004 (age 22)
- Place of birth: Netherlands
- Height: 1.68 m (5 ft 6 in)
- Positions: Midfielder; forward

Team information
- Current team: Salford City
- Number: 10

Youth career
- 2020–2021: Salford City

Senior career*
Years	Team	Apps	(Gls)
2021–	Salford City	82	(15)
2022–2023	→ Warrington Rylands (loan)	19	(6)
2023	→ Chester (loan)	3	(1)
- * Club domestic league appearances and goals as of 18:50, 1 January 2026 (UTC)

Kelly Harmani N'Mai (born 1 May 2004) is a Dutch footballer who plays as a midfielder for Salford City. A product of Salford's academy, he made his senior debut in 2021.

== Career ==
Born in the Netherlands, N'Mai began playing football at an early age and was scouted by Ajax. After moving to the United Kingdom with his family, he had trials for both Manchester United and Manchester City before joining Salford City in 2020. N'Mai made his professional debut on 28 August 2021, coming on as an 85th-minute substitute for Conor McAleny in Salford's 3–0 EFL League Two win against Newport County, their first win of the season. He started his first game for the club in an away fixture against Scunthorpe United in November and signed his first professional contract the same month, a deal lasting until 2023.

On 29 September 2022, N'Mai joined Northern Premier League Premier Division club Warrington Rylands on an initial one-month loan deal. He scored his first goal for the club in a 2–1 defeat to Lancaster City on 11 October and on 26 November scored a brace to secure a comeback victory against Stalybridge Celtic, coming on as a substitute to turn the game around for Rylands and securing the club's first away win in two months. In January 2023, N'Mai's loan was extended further. In March, N'Mai stepped up a division when he was loaned to National League North team Chester until the end of the season. In May, he featured as a trialist for the academy of Manchester United in a fixture at the Trafford Training Centre against Leicester City's academy.

Following injuries to Connor McLennan, Conor McAleny, and Luke Bolton at the beginning of the 2023–24 season, N'Mai was selected to start in a 2–1 home win against Newport, with his performance being recognised with the Man of the Match award.

In July 2024, N'Mai signed a new two-year contract with Salford City.

== Career statistics ==
As of 1 January 2026

Club	Season	League			FA Cup		League Cup		Other		Total	
Club	Season	Division	Apps	Goals	Apps	Goals	Apps	Goals	Apps	Goals	Apps	Goals
Salford City	2021–22	League Two	7	0	1	0	0	0	2 (Note: Appearance(s) in EFL Trophy)	0	10	0
Salford City	2022–23	League Two	0	0	0	0	0	0	1	0	1	0
Salford City	2023–24	League Two	28	3	2	0	1	0	2	0	32	3
Salford City	2024–25	League Two	32	9	2	0	1	0	2	0	36	9
Salford City	2025–26	League Two	15	3	2	3	1	0	0	0	18	6
Salford City	Total		82	15	7	3	3	0	7	0	99	18
Warrington Rylands (loan)	2022–23	NPL Premier Division	19	6	0	0	–		1 (Note: Appearance(s) in the FA Trophy)	0	20	6
Chester (loan)	2022–23	National League North	3	1	0	0	–		0	0	3	1
Career total			104	22	7	3	3	0	8	0	121	25
