= Jez Davies =

English footballer (born 2004)

Personal information
- Full name: Jezreel Titus Chinedu Davies
- Date of birth: 10 July 2004 (age 22)
- Place of birth: London, England
- Height: 1.80 m (5 ft 11 in)
- Position: Midfielder

Team information
- Current team: Enfield Town

Youth career
- Tottenham Hotspur
- 2022–2024: Burnley

Senior career*
Years	Team	Apps	(Gls)
2024–2025	Salford City	1	(0)
2024	→ Marine (loan)	1	(0)
2024–2025	→ Ebbsfleet United (loan)	6	(0)
2025	→ Welling United (loan)	5	(0)
2025–2026	Peterborough Sports	24	(0)
2026–	Enfield Town	2	(0)
- * Club domestic league appearances and goals as of 18:03, 24 September 2026 (UTC)

Jezreel Titus Chinedu Davies (born 10 July 2004) is an English professional footballer who plays as a midfielder for Isthmian League Premier Division club Enfield Town.

== Career ==
Born in London, following his release from Tottenham Hotspur, Davies joined the academy of Championship club Burnley in December 2022 on a contract until the end of the season, signing a one-year extension in June 2023.

On 24 January 2024, Davies joined League Two club Salford City on an eighteen-month contract. He made his senior debut on 17 March 2024, being substituted on in additional time at the end of a 3–1 victory over Morecambe.

On 13 September 2024, Davies joined National League North club Marine on a one-month loan deal.

On 16 November 2024, Davies joined National League side Ebbsfleet United on an initial one-month loan deal. He made his debut the same day, being sent off in the first-half of an eventual 6–0 home defeat to Solihull Moors. Upon the expiration of the original deal, the loan was extended by a further month. On 31 March 2025, he joined National League South side Welling United on loan for the remainder of the season.

On 12 May 2025, Salford announced he would be released in June when his contract expires. In September 2025, Davies joined National League North club Peterborough Sports.

In September 2026, he joined Isthmian League Premier Division club Enfield Town.

== Career statistics ==
As of end of 2024–25 season

Appearances and goals by club, season and competition
Club	Season	League			FA Cup		League Cup		Other		Total	
Club	Season	Division	Apps	Goals	Apps	Goals	Apps	Goals	Apps	Goals	Apps	Goals
Salford City	2023–24	League Two	1	0	0	0	0	0	0	0	1	0
Salford City	2024–25	League Two	0	0	0	0	1	0	1 (Note: Appearance(s) in EFL Trophy)	0	2	0
Salford City	Total		1	0	0	0	1	0	1	0	3	0
Ebbsfleet United (loan)	2024–25	National League	6	0	0	0	—		1 (Note: Appearance(s) in National League Cup)	0	7	0
Welling United (loan)	2024–25	National League South	5	0	0	0	—		0	0	5	0
Career total			12	0	0	0	1	0	2	0	15	0
