= Tosin Olopade =

English footballer (born 2004)

Personal information
- Full name: Oluwatosin David Olopade
- Date of birth: 14 December 2004 (age 21)
- Place of birth: Ireland
- Position: Right-back

Team information
- Current team: Spalding United
- Number: 2

Youth career
- 20??–2021: Pulse Academy
- 2021–2023: Burnley

Senior career*
| Years | Team | Apps | (Gls) |
| 2023–2026 | Salford City | 1 | (0) |
| 2025–2026 | → Spalding United (loan) | 12 | (0) |
| 2026– | Spalding United | 19 | (0) |
- * Club domestic league appearances and goals as of 22:22, 25 August 2026 (BST)

Oluwatosin David Olopade (born 14 December 2004) is an Irish professional footballer who plays as a right-back for club Spalding United.

== Career ==
=== Early career ===
Olopade came through the Pulse Academy to sign with Burnley on 9 November 2021 following a successful trial.

=== Salford City ===
On 31 July 2023, Olopade joined the B team of Salford City on a one-year deal. He made his debut in senior football on 5 September 2023, in a 3–0 defeat at Bolton Wanderers in the EFL Trophy. He impressed manager Neil Wood. He played his first League Two game on 10 August 2024, in a 2–0 defeat to Port Vale at Moor Lane. He was offered a new contract at the end of the 2024–25 season.

=== Spalding United ===
After a successful loan spell, he joined Spalding United on 23 January 2026.

== Career statistics ==
As of end of 2024–25 season

Appearances and goals by club, season and competition
| Club | Season | League | | | FA Cup | | EFL Cup | | Other | | Total | |
| Club | Season | Division | Apps | Goals | Apps | Goals | Apps | Goals | Apps | Goals | Apps | Goals |
|---|---|---|---|---|---|---|---|---|---|---|---|---|
| Salford City | 2023–24 | League Two | 0 | 0 | 0 | 0 | 1 | 0 | 2 (Note: Appearance(s) in EFL Trophy) | 0 | 3 | 0 |
| Salford City | 2024–25 | League Two | 1 | 0 | 0 | 0 | 0 | 0 | 1 | 0 | 2 | 0 |
| Salford City | Total | | 1 | 0 | 0 | 0 | 1 | 0 | 3 | 0 | 5 | 0 |
| Career total | | | 1 | 0 | 0 | 0 | 1 | 0 | 3 | 0 | 5 | 0 |
