= Liam Humbles =

American soccer player (born 2003)

Personal information
- Full name: Liam Andres Humbles
- Date of birth: December 5, 2003 (age 22)
- Place of birth: Miami Beach, Florida, U.S.
- Height: 5 ft 9 in (1.75 m)
- Position: Midfielder

Team information
- Current team: Altrincham

Youth career
- AFC Wimbledon
- Salford City

Senior career*
Years	Team	Apps	(Gls)
2022–2025	Salford City	11	(1)
2023	→ Nantwich Town (loan)	1	(0)
2024	→ Altrincham (loan)	8	(0)
2024–2025	→ Gateshead (loan)	21	(1)
2025–2026	Rochdale	1	(0)
2026	→ Altrincham (loan)	18	(3)
2026–	Altrincham	6	(1)
- * Club domestic league appearances and goals as of 10:55, 5 September 2026 (UTC)

Liam Andres Humbles (born December 5, 2003) is an American professional soccer player who plays as a midfielder for National League club Altrincham.

== Early life ==
Being born in Miami Beach, Florida. Humbles spend his early years attending Saint Rose of Lima School, and playing for the Weston FC junior team. After turning 14, Humbles moved to England to pursue playing professional football.

== Career ==
Having progressed through the club's youth system, Humbles made the step up to the club's Elite Development Squad ahead of the 2022–23 season. He joined Northern Premier League Premier Division club Nantwich Town in March 2023 on loan until the end of the season.

On September 5, 2023, he made his first-team professional debut for Salford City, featuring from the bench in a 3–0 EFL Trophy defeat to Bolton Wanderers. On October 21, he scored his first goal for the club in his second league appearance, scoring a late equalizer in a 2–2 draw with Swindon Town.

In September 2024, Humbles joined National League club Altrincham on a one-month loan deal. In December 2024, he joined Gateshead on loan for the remainder of the season.

On May 12, 2025, Salford announced he would be released in June, when his contract expired.

On 27 June 2025, Humbles signed a two-year contract with Rochdale. On 12 January 2026, Humbles returned to Altrincham on loan until the end of the season.

On 30 June 2026, following his successful loan spell the previous season, he returned to Altrincham on a permanent deal.

== Career statistics ==
As of end of 2024–25 season

Appearances and goals by club, season and competition
Club	Season	League			FA Cup		League Cup		Other		Total	
Club	Season	Division	Apps	Goals	Apps	Goals	Apps	Goals	Apps	Goals	Apps	Goals
Salford City	2022–23	League Two	0	0	0	0	0	0	0	0	0	0
Salford City	2023–24	League Two	10	1	0	0	1	0	3 (Note: Appearance(s) in EFL Trophy)	0	14	1
Salford City	2024–25	League Two	1	0	0	0	0	0	2	0	3	0
Salford City	Total		11	1	0	0	1	0	5	0	17	1
Nantwich Town (loan)	2022–23	NPL Premier Division	1	0	0	0	—		0	0	1	0
Altrincham (loan)	2024–25	National League	8	0	2	0	—		1 (Note: Appearance(s) in National League Cup)	0	11	0
Gateshead (loan)	2024–25	National League	21	1	0	0	—		1 (Note: Appearance(s) in FA Trophy)	0	22	1
Total			41	2	2	0	1	0	7	0	51	2
