= Ossama Ashley =

English footballer

Personal information
- Full name: Ossama Wassim Ashley
- Date of birth: 23 February 2000 (age 26)
- Place of birth: Greenwich, England
- Height: 1.80 m (5 ft 11 in)
- Position: Midfielder

Team information
- Current team: Rotherham United
- Number: 6

Youth career
- 2016–2017: Fulham
- 2017–2019: AFC Wimbledon

Senior career*
Years	Team	Apps	(Gls)
2017–2020	AFC Wimbledon	0	(0)
2020	→ Billericay Town (loan)	1	(0)
2020–2022	West Ham United	0	(0)
2022–2023	Colchester United	28	(0)
2023–2026	Salford City	59	(2)
2026–	Rotherham United	0	(0)
- * Club domestic league appearances and goals as of 21:18, 2 August 2026(UTC)

Ossama Wassim Ashley (born 23 February 2000) is an English professional footballer who plays as a midfielder for EFL League Two club Rotherham United.

== Playing career ==
=== AFC Wimbledon and West Ham United ===
Ashley joined AFC Wimbledon's youth set-up in March 2017 after a spell in the Fulham Academy. On 5 December 2017, he made his professional debut as a substitute in a 2–0 EFL Trophy defeat at Yeovil Town. On 4 March 2019, he signed a professional contract with AFC Wimbledon after impressing playing for the under-23s. In June 2020 he was released by AFC Wimbledon after his contract expired.

On 2 September 2020, following a successful trial, Ashley signed for West Ham United on a one-year contract, with the option of further year. In May 2022, West Ham announced that Ashley would be leaving the club at the end of his contract in June 2022.

=== Colchester United ===
In July 2022, Ashley signed for Colchester United on a one-year contract.

=== Salford City ===
On 30 June 2023, Ashley became the third signing of the transfer window for fellow League Two club Salford City, signing a two-year deal for an undisclosed fee.

Following a successful 2024–25 season that saw Ashley named Salford City Player of the Season, he had a contract extension triggered.

At the end of the 2025–26 season he was released by the club.

=== Rotherham United ===
On 10 July 2026, Ashley signed a one-year deal with fellow League Two club Rotherham United.

== Personal life ==
Born in England, Ashley is of Jamaican and Moroccan descent.

== Statistics ==
As of end of 2024–25 season

Club	Season	Division	League		FA Cup		EFL Cup		Other		Total	
Club	Season	Division	Apps	Goals	Apps	Goals	Apps	Goals	Apps	Goals	Apps	Goals
AFC Wimbledon	2017–18	League One	0	0	0	0	0	0	1 (Note: Appearance(s) in EFL Trophy)	0	1	0
AFC Wimbledon	2018–19	League One	0	0	0	0	0	0	0	0	0	0
AFC Wimbledon	2019–20	League One	0	0	0	0	0	0	0	0	0	0
AFC Wimbledon	Total		0	0	0	0	0	0	1	0	1	0
Billericay Town (loan)	2019–20	National League South	1	0	0	0	—		0	0	1	0
West Ham United U21	2020–21	—			—		—		1	0	1	0
West Ham United U21	2021–22	—			—		—		1	0	1	0
West Ham United U21	Total		—		—		—		2	0	2	0
Colchester United	2022–23	League Two	28	0	1	0	2	0	4	0	35	0
Salford City	2023–24	League Two	8	0	0	0	2	0	1	0	11	0
Salford City	2024–25	League Two	33	1	3	0	0	0	0	0	36	1
Salford City	Total		41	1	3	0	2	0	1	0	47	1
Career total			70	1	4	0	4	0	8	0	86	1

== Honours ==
Individual

- Salford City Supporters' Player of the Year: 2024–25
