= Marcus Dackers =

Welsh footballer (born 2003)

Personal information
- Full name: Marcus Matthias Dackers
- Date of birth: 9 January 2003 (age 23)
- Height: 6 ft 7 in (2.01 m)
- Position: Striker

Team information
- Current team: Daegu
- Number: 16

Youth career
- 2008–2015: Manchester City
- 2015–2019: Brighton & Hove Albion

Senior career*
| Years | Team | Apps | (Gls) |
| 2019–2021 | Brighton & Hove Albion | 0 | (0) |
| 2019 | → Loxwood (loan) | 7 | (0) |
| 2020 | → Lancing (loan) | 3 | (0) |
| 2021–2025 | Salford City | 15 | (0) |
| 2021 | → Stalybridge Celtic (loan) | 8 | (7) |
| 2022 | → Chester (loan) | 20 | (9) |
| 2022 | → Southend United (loan) | 6 | (3) |
| 2023 | → Woking (loan) | 19 | (3) |
| 2023–2024 | → Altrincham (loan) | 4 | (1) |
| 2024 | → Southend United (loan) | 17 | (1) |
| 2024–2025 | → Morecambe (loan) | 36 | (1) |
| 2025–2026 | Kilmarnock | 24 | (2) |
| 2026– | Daegu | 18 | (3) |

International career
| 2018 | Wales U16 | 2 | (0) |
| 2019 | Wales U17 | 5 | (1) |
| 2021 | Wales U19 | 2 | (0) |
- * Club domestic league appearances and goals as of 14:13, 6 September 2026 (UTC)

Marcus Matthias Dackers (born 9 January 2003) is a Welsh professional footballer who plays as a striker for K League 2 club Daegu.

== Club career ==
Dackers played youth football with Manchester City and Brighton & Hove Albion. Whilst at Brighton, he spent time on loan at Lancing. His Lancing debut came in a match on 6 February 2020 against Lingfield.

He signed for Salford City on a two-year contract in July 2021, and moved on loan to Stalybridge Celtic in October 2021. He scored eight goals in 10 games, and received comparisons to former Celtic loanee Dominic Calvert-Lewin. During his time at Celtic, he was managed by fellow Welsh striker Simon Haworth, who helped develop his game. Salford recalled Dackers on 12 November 2021. He made his debut for Salford City on 13 November 2021 in the league.

In January 2022, he joined Chester on an initial one-month loan, with manager Steve Watson describing it as a "natural progression" in his career. Dackers scored his first goal in a 5–0 win against Southport on 5 February, and later that month his loan was extended for a further month, and again in March until the end of the season. By March he had scored seven goals for the club in all competitions and said "I feel like I have come on and been improving in every single game. Now to get my first brace for the club was a great feeling".

Dackers moved on a month-long loan to Southend United in September 2022, and scored on his début against Chesterfield. Dackers said playing against league-leaders Chesterfield and Wrexham in his first two games was important to test himself as a player. Later that month Southend said they wished to extend the loan.

He moved on loan to Woking in January 2023, and to Altrincham in November 2023. In January 2024, he returned to Southend United on loan until the end of the season.

In August 2024 he moved on loan to Morecambe.

On 12 May 2025, Salford announced he would be released in June when his contract expires. He then signed a one-year contract with Scottish Premiership club Kilmarnock.

In March 2026 he signed for K League 2 club Daegu.

== International career ==
He is a Wales youth international. He played schoolboy football for Wales before being called up to the Under-17 squad. He also played for them at under-19 level.

== Style of play ==
His manager at Chester, Steve Watson, described him as "a big lad but he is a good mover. You get people of that size and they can be immobile but he's not. He is a good athlete".

== Career statistics ==
As of match played 15 February 2026

Appearances and goals by club, season and competition
| Club | Season | League | | | National Cup | | League Cup | | Other | | Total | |
| Club | Season | Division | Apps | Goals | Apps | Goals | Apps | Goals | Apps | Goals | Apps | Goals |
|---|---|---|---|---|---|---|---|---|---|---|---|---|
| Brighton & Hove Albion | 2019–20 | Premier League | 0 | 0 | 0 | 0 | 0 | 0 | — | | 0 | 0 |
| Brighton & Hove Albion | 2020–21 | Premier League | 0 | 0 | 0 | 0 | 0 | 0 | — | | 0 | 0 |
| Brighton & Hove Albion | Total | | 0 | 0 | 0 | 0 | 0 | 0 | 0 | 0 | 0 | 0 |
| Loxwood (loan) | 2019–20 | Southern Combination League Premier Division | 7 | 0 | — | | — | | — | | 7 | 0 |
| Lancing (loan) | 2019–20 | Southern Combination League Premier Division | 3 | 0 | — | | — | | — | | 3 | 0 |
| Salford City | 2021–22 | League Two | 1 | 0 | 1 | 0 | 0 | 0 | 0 | 0 | 2 | 0 |
| Salford City | 2022–23 | League Two | 5 | 0 | 1 | 0 | 0 | 0 | 1 (Note: Appearance(s) in EFL Trophy) | 0 | 7 | 0 |
| Salford City | 2023–24 | League Two | 6 | 0 | 1 | 0 | 2 | 0 | 3 | 1 | 12 | 1 |
| Salford City | 2024–25 | League Two | 3 | 0 | 0 | 0 | 1 | 0 | 1 | 0 | 5 | 0 |
| Salford City | Total | | 15 | 0 | 3 | 0 | 3 | 0 | 5 | 1 | 26 | 1 |
| Stalybridge Celtic (loan) | 2021–22 | Northern Premier League Premier Division | 8 | 7 | — | | — | | 2 (Note: One appearance in FA Trophy, one appearance and one goal in Cheshire Senior Cup) | 1 | 10 | 8 |
| Chester (loan) | 2021–22 | National League North | 20 | 9 | — | | — | | — | | 20 | 9 |
| Southend United (loan) | 2022–23 | National League | 6 | 3 | — | | — | | 0 | 0 | 6 | 3 |
| Woking (loan) | 2022–23 | National League | 19 | 3 | — | | — | | 1 (Note: Appearance in National League play-offs) | 0 | 20 | 3 |
| Altrincham (loan) | 2023–24 | National League | 4 | 1 | 0 | 0 | — | | 1 (Note: Appearance(s) in FA Trophy) | 0 | 5 | 1 |
| Southend United (loan) | 2023–24 | National League | 17 | 1 | 0 | 0 | — | | 0 | 0 | 17 | 1 |
| Morecambe (loan) | 2024–25 | League Two | 36 | 1 | 3 | 0 | 0 | 0 | 0 | 0 | 39 | 1 |
| Kilmarnock | 2025–26 | Scottish Premiership | 24 | 2 | 1 | 0 | 5 | 2 | — | | 30 | 4 |
| Career total | | | 159 | 27 | 7 | 0 | 8 | 2 | 9 | 2 | 183 | 31 |
