= Daniel Chesters =

English footballer

- Chesters with Wealdstone in 2026

Personal information
- Full name: Daniel Peter James Chesters
- Date of birth: 4 April 2002 (age 24)
- Place of birth: Hitchin, England
- Height: 1.77 m (5 ft 10 in)
- Position: Midfielder

Team information
- Current team: Wealdstone
- Number: 11

Youth career
- 2008–2009: Stevenage Blue Socks
- 2009–2021: West Ham United

Senior career*
Years	Team	Apps	(Gls)
2021–2024	West Ham United	1	(0)
2022–2023	→ Colchester United	14	(0)
2024	→ Salford City (loan)	13	(0)
2024–2026	Salford City	7	(0)
2026–	Wealdstone	13	(0)
- * Club domestic league appearances and goals as of 21:02, 10 November 2026 (UTC)

Daniel Peter James Chesters (born 4 April 2002) is an English professional footballer who plays as a midfielder for National League club Wealdstone.

== Club career ==
=== West Ham United ===
A youth product of Stevenage Blue Socks, he joined the academy of West Ham United at under-8 level. He started playing with their U23 development team in 2018 as a 15 year old, signing his first professional contract with the club on 16 June 2021. He made his professional debut with West Ham on 21 October 2021, coming on as a late substitute in a 3–0 UEFA Europa League group stage win over Genk. On 26 August 2022, Chesters joined Colchester United on-loan for the remainder of the 2022-23 season.

In January 2023, Chesters was recalled by West Ham having made 18 league and cup appearances for Colchester. In February 2024, Chesters joined Salford City on loan for the remainder of the 2023–24 season.

On 24 May 2024, West Ham announced that Chesters would be released at the end of the 2023–24 season.

=== Salford City ===
On 5 June 2024, Chesters agreed to return League Two side Salford City on a permanent basis, signing a two-year deal. In October 2024, he suffered an anterior cruciate ligament rupture and was ruled out for the remainder of the season.

=== Wealdstone ===
On 22 July 2026, Chesters signed for National League club Wealdstone.

== Style of play ==
Chesters is described as a "livewire attacking midfielder capable of opening up the tightest of defences".

== Career statistics ==
As of 10 November 2026

Appearances and goals by club, season and competition
Club	Season	League			FA Cup		EFL Cup		Continental		Other		Total	
Club	Season	Division	Apps	Goals	Apps	Goals	Apps	Goals	Apps	Goals	Apps	Goals	Apps	Goals
West Ham United U21	2018-19	—			—		—		—		1 (Note: Appearance(s) in EFL Trophy)	0	1	0
West Ham United U21	2019-20	—			—		—		—		1	0	1	0
West Ham United U21	2020-21	—			—		—		—		3	0	3	0
West Ham United U21	2021-22	—			—		—		—		3	0	3	0
West Ham United U21	2023-24	—			—		—		—		5	1	5	1
West Ham United U21	Total		—		—		—		—		13	1	13	1
West Ham United	2021-22	Premier League	1	0	0	0	0	0	1 (Note: Appearance(s) in UEFA Europa League)	0	—		2	0
West Ham United	2022-23	Premier League	0	0	0	0	0	0	0	0	—		0	0
West Ham United	2023-24	Premier League	0	0	0	0	0	0	0	0	—		0	0
West Ham United	Total		1	0	0	0	0	0	1	0	—		2	0
Colchester United (loan)	2022-23	League Two	14	0	1	0	0	0	—		3	0	18	0
Salford City (loan)	2023-24	League Two	13	0	0	0	0	0	—		0	0	13	0
Salford City	2024-25	League Two	7	0	0	0	1	0	—		1	0	9	0
Salford City	2025-26	League Two	0	0	0	0	0	0	—		0	0	0	0
Salford City	Total		7	0	0	0	1	0	—		1	0	9	0
Wealdstone	2026-27	National League	13	0	2	0	—		—		2 (Note: Appearance(s) in National League Cup)	0	17	0
Career total			48	0	3	0	1	0	1	0	19	1	72	1
