= Liam Shephard =

Welsh footballer (born 1994)

Personal information
- Full name: Liam Shephard
- Date of birth: 22 November 1994 (age 31)
- Place of birth: Pentre, Wales
- Height: 1.78 m (5 ft 10 in)
- Position: Right-back

Team information
- Current team: Penybont
- Number: 32

Youth career
- –2011: Cardiff City
- 2011–2013: Swansea City

Senior career*
Years	Team	Apps	(Gls)
2013–2017	Swansea City	0	(0)
2015	→ Yeovil Town (loan)	20	(0)
2016	→ Yeovil Town (loan)	6	(0)
2016–2017	→ Yeovil Town (loan)	38	(1)
2017–2018	Peterborough United	24	(0)
2018–2020	Forest Green Rovers	58	(6)
2020–2021	Newport County	42	(2)
2021–2025	Salford City	70	(3)
2025–2026	Newport County	14	(1)
2026–	Penybont	15	(0)

International career^{‡}
2015	Wales U21	2	(0)
- * Club domestic league appearances and goals as of 08:19, 8 November 2026 (UTC) ‡ National team caps and goals as of 19:11, 17 November 2015 (UTC)

Liam Shephard (born 22 November 1994) is a Welsh professional footballer who plays as a right-back for Cymru Premier club Penybont. He is a former Wales under 21 international.

== Early life ==
Shephard grew up in Pentre, Rhondda Cynon Taf. He is son of former footballer Garry Shephard.

== Club career ==
=== Swansea City ===
Shephard joined Swansea City from Cardiff City in the summer of 2011, and progressed through Swansea City's Academy. Shephard signed his first professional deal with Swansea at the start of the 2013–14 season. Shephard broke into the first-team squad in the first half of the 2014–15 season, and was included on the bench for four Premier League matches and two cup games. Shephard was rewarded for his progress with a new 2 1/2-year contract until June 2017.

On 17 January 2015, Shephard joined League One team Yeovil Town on a youth loan deal and made his professional debut three days later against Preston North End. Yeovil later extended the loan until the end of the season. Shephard went on to make 20 appearances for the Glovers and was awarded Young Player of the Year, as Yeovil were relegated to League Two.

Shephard made his first team debut for Swansea City in the FA Cup against Oxford United, on 10 January 2016, in a 3–2 third round defeat.

On 24 March 2016, Shephard returned to Yeovil Town on a month loan deal. Initially brought in as cover for fellow Swansea loanee Connor Roberts, Shephard started six matches all in a defensive midfield role as he helped Yeovil to avoid relegation.

On 1 July 2016, Shephard joined Yeovil Town for a third time on a six-month loan deal.

Upon his return from his loan spell with Yeovil, Shephard was released by Swansea at the end of the 2016–17 season.

=== Peterborough United ===
On 10 July 2017, Shephard signed for League One club Peterborough United on a two-year contract.

=== Forest Green Rovers ===
On 28 June 2018, Shephard joined League Two club Forest Green Rovers for an undisclosed fee on a two-year contract. Shephard was released by Forest Green Rovers at the end of the 2019–20 season.

=== Newport County ===
On 2 September 2020 Shephard joined Newport County on a one-year contract. He made his debut for Newport on 5 September 2020 in the 2–0 EFL Cup win against Swansea City. He scored his first goal for Newport on 19 September 2020 in the League Two 2–1 win against Barrow. Shephard played for Newport in the League Two playoff final at Wembley Stadium on 31 May 2021 which Newport lost to Morecambe, 1–0 after a 107th-minute penalty.

=== Salford City ===
In June 2021 Shephard rejected a contract extension at Newport and signed a two-year contract at Salford City. In June 2023 Shephard extended his Salford contract until the end of the 2024–25 season.

On 12 May 2025, the club announced he would be released in June when his contract expired.

=== Return to Newport County ===
On 6 August 2025 Shephard rejoined Newport County on a one year contract. He made his second debut for Newport on 9 August 2025 in the 2-1 League Two win against Crawley Town, scoring Newport's second goal.

He was released by the club at the end of the 2025–26 season.

=== Penybont ===
On 3 July 2026, Shephard joined Cymru Premier club Penybont.

== International career ==
Shephard was called up to Wales under-21 squad to face Bulgaria in March 2015. Later in the qualification campaign, Shephard made his debut in a 2–1 win over Armenia.

== Style of play ==
Shephard is primarily a right-back but can also play at centre-back.

== Career statistics ==
As of match played 3 February 2024

Appearances and goals by club, season and competition
Club	Season	League			FA Cup		League Cup		Other		Total	
Club	Season	Division	Apps	Goals	Apps	Goals	Apps	Goals	Apps	Goals	Apps	Goals
Swansea City	2014–15	Premier League	0	0	0	0	0	0	—		0	0
Swansea City	2015–16	Premier League	0	0	1	0	0	0	—		1	0
Swansea City	2016–17	Premier League	0	0	0	0	0	0	—		0	0
Swansea City	Total		0	0	1	0	0	0	—		1	0
Yeovil Town (loan)	2014–15	League One	20	0	0	0	0	0	0	0	20	0
Yeovil Town (loan)	2015–16	League Two	6	0	0	0	0	0	0	0	6	0
Yeovil Town (loan)	2016–17	League Two	38	1	2	0	2	0	4 (Note: Appearances in EFL Trophy)	0	46	1
Yeovil Town (loan)	Total		64	1	2	0	2	0	4	0	72	1
Peterborough United	2017–18	League One	24	0	2	0	0	0	4	0	30	0
Forest Green Rovers	2018–19	League Two	39	5	0	0	2	0	3 (Note: One appearance in EFL Trophy, two appearances in League Two play-offs)	0	44	5
Forest Green Rovers	2019–20	League Two	19	1	3	1	0	0	1	0	23	2
Forest Green Rovers	Total		58	6	3	1	2	0	4	0	67	7
Newport County	2020–21	League Two	42	2	2	0	4	0	4 (Note: One appearance in EFL Trophy, three appearances in League Two play-offs)	0	52	2
Salford City	2021–22	League Two	35	3	2	0	0	0	1	0	38	3
Salford City	2022–23	League Two	9	0	0	0	0	0	2 (Note: Appearances in League Two play-offs)	0	11	0
Salford City	2023–24	League Two	12	0	1	0	2	0	1	0	16	0
Salford City	2024–25	League Two	0	0	0	0	0	0	0	0	0	0
Salford City	Total		56	3	3	0	2	0	4	0	65	3
Career total			244	12	13	1	10	0	20	0	287	13
