= Garry Shephard =

Welsh footballer

Personal information
- Full name: Garry Shephard
- Date of birth: 30 March 1976 (age 50)
- Place of birth: Ton Pentre, Wales
- Height: 1.75 m (5 ft 9 in)
- Position: Striker

Senior career*
Years	Team	Apps	(Gls)
1996–1999	Merthyr Tydfil	?	(?)
1999–2005	Newport County	136	(47)
2005–2010	Merthyr Tydfil	?	(?)
2010–2015	Merthyr Town	?	(?)

Managerial career
- 2007–2010: Merthyr Tydfil
- 2010–2015: Merthyr Town
- * Club domestic league appearances and goals as of 22 June 2012

Garry Shephard (born 30 March 1976) is a Welsh former semi-professional football player, who played as a striker. He was a prolific goalscorer and fans' favourite for non-league sides Newport County and Merthyr.

== Personal ==
Garry is the father of former Newport County right-back Liam Shephard and former Haverfordwest County midfielder Corey Shephard. Shephard runs a T-shirt/kit supplying and embroidery business in his local Rhondda Valleys
