= Junior Luamba =

English footballer

Personal information
- Full name: Junior Luamba
- Date of birth: 27 April 2003 (age 23)
- Place of birth: Congo DR
- Height: 1.88 m (6 ft 2 in)
- Position: Forward

Team information
- Current team: Carlisle United
- Number: 11

Youth career
- –2020: Oldham Athletic

Senior career*
Years	Team	Apps	(Gls)
2020–2023	Oldham Athletic	28	(2)
2023–2025	Salford City	31	(2)
2025	→ York City (loan)	17	(1)
2025–	Carlisle United	19	(4)
- * Club domestic league appearances and goals as of 17:54, 11 June 2026 (UTC)

Junior Luamba (born 27 April 2003) is an English professional footballer who plays as a forward for National League club Carlisle United.

== Playing career ==
Luamba made his first-team debut for Oldham Athletic on 29 December 2020, starting in a 0–0 draw at Grimsby Town before he was taken off for Davis Keillor-Dunn on 67 minutes. Manager Harry Kewell said that "it was disappointing that he didn't get his goal but he worked very hard and I think he is a special talent". He entered negotiations with the club regarding a new contract at the end of the 2022–23 season.

In October 2023, Luamba signed for League Two club Salford City, joining the club's reserve team until the end of the season.

On 1 February 2025, Luamba joined National League side York City on loan for the remainder of the season.

On 25 June 2025, Luamba signed for National League side Carlisle United on a two-year deal for an undisclosed fee.

Junior Luamba picked up his first career red card in the National League Play-Off Semi-Final home meeting with Boreham Wood, which resulted in a 2-1 loss for Luamba's side. Early on in extra-time, Luamba slid in with a late challenge and was handed a red card, forcing Carlisle to play the rest of the game with ten men.

== Statistics ==
As of end of 2024–25 season

Appearances and goals by club, season and competition
Club	Season	League			FA Cup		EFL Cup		Other		Total	
Club	Season	Division	Apps	Goals	Apps	Goals	Apps	Goals	Apps	Goals	Apps	Goals
Oldham Athletic	2020–21	League Two	2	0	0	0	0	0	0	0	2	0
Oldham Athletic	2021–22	League Two	15	2	0	0	2	0	2 (Note: Appearance(s) in EFL Trophy)	0	19	2
Oldham Athletic	2022–23	National League	11	0	1	0	—		0	0	12	0
Oldham Athletic	Total		28	2	1	0	2	0	2	0	33	2
Salford City	2023–24	League Two	21	1	0	0	0	0	2	0	23	1
Salford City	2024–25	League Two	10	1	0	0	1	0	3	0	14	1
Salford City	Total		31	2	0	0	1	0	5	0	37	2
York City (loan)	2024–25	National League	17	1	0	0	—		1 (Note: Appearance(s) in National Leageu play-offs)	0	18	1
Career total			76	5	1	0	3	0	8	0	88	5
