= 2023–24 Salford City F.C. season =

84th season in existence of Salford City FC

Salford City
2023–24 season
- Owner: Project 92 Ltd
- Head Coach: Neil Wood (until 27 December); Karl Robinson (from 5 January)
- Stadium: Moor Lane
- League Two: 20th
- FA Cup: First round
- EFL Cup: Third round
- EFL Trophy: Group stage
| Home colours | Away colours | Third colours |

The 2023–24 season is the 84th season in the history of Salford City and their fifth consecutive season in League Two. The club are participating in League Two, the FA Cup, the EFL Cup, and the EFL Trophy.

== Current squad ==
As of 23 March 2024

| No. | Name | Position | Nationality | Place of birth | Date of birth (age) | Previous club | Date signed | Fee | Contract end |
Goalkeepers
| 1 | Alex Cairns | GK | (England) | Doncaster | 4 January 1993 (age 33) | Fleetwood Town | 1 July 2023 | Free | 30 June 2025 |
| 31 | Joel Torrance | GK | (England) | Bolton | 2 April 2002 (age 24) | Altrincham | 24 July 2021 | Free | 30 June 2024 |
Defenders
| 2 | Ethan Ingram | RB | (England) | Gloucester | 16 April 2003 (age 23) | West Bromwich Albion | 1 September 2023 | Loan | 31 May 2024 |
| 3 | Declan John | LB | (Wales) | Merthyr Tydfil | 30 June 1995 (age 31) | Bolton Wanderers | 1 September 2023 | Loan | 31 May 2024 |
| 5 | Adrian Mariappa | CB | (Jamaica) | (England) Harrow | 3 October 1986 (age 40) | Burton Albion | 23 March 2023 | Free | 30 June 2024 |
| 16 | Curtis Tilt | CB | (Jamaica) | (England) Walsall | 4 August 1991 (age 35) | Wigan Athletic | 18 July 2023 | Free | 30 June 2025 |
| 29 | Luke Garbutt | LB | (England) | Harrogate | 21 May 1993 (age 33) | Blackpool | 1 July 2023 | Free | 30 June 2025 |
| 32 | Liam Shephard | RB | (Wales) | Pentre | 22 November 1994 (age 31) | (Wales) Newport County | 1 July 2021 | Free | 30 June 2025 |
| 42 | Theo Vassell | CB | (England) | Stoke-on-Trent | 2 January 1997 (age 29) | Wrexham | 12 November 2021 | Free | 30 June 2024 |
| 49 | Jacob Lara | CB | (England) | | | Academy | 27 July 2023 | Trainee | 30 June 2024 |
| 50 | Tosin Olopade | RB | (Republic of Ireland) | | | Burnley | 27 July 2023 | Free | 30 June 2024 |
Midfielders
| 4 | Ossama Ashley | CM | (England) | Greenwich | 23 February 2000 (age 26) | Colchester United | 30 June 2023 | Undisclosed | 30 June 2025 |
| 6 | Elliot Watt | CM | (Scotland) | (England) Preston | 11 March 2000 (age 26) | Bradford City | 1 July 2022 | Undisclosed | 30 June 2024 |
| 7 | Ryan Watson | DM | (England) | Crewe | 7 July 1993 (age 33) | Tranmere Rovers | 14 January 2022 | Undisclosed | 30 June 2025 |
| 8 | Matty Lund | CM | (Northern Ireland) | (England) Manchester | 21 November 1990 (age 35) | Rochdale | 1 July 2021 | Undisclosed | 30 June 2024 |
| 14 | Stevie Mallan | CM | (Scotland) | Glasgow | 25 March 1996 (age 30) | (Turkey) Yeni Malatyaspor | 1 July 2022 | Undisclosed | 30 June 2024 |
| 19 | Jez Davies | CM | (England) | London | 10 July 2004 (age 22) | Burnley | 24 January 2024 | Free | 30 June 2025 |
| 20 | Daniel Chesters | RM | (England) | Hitchin | 4 April 2002 (age 24) | West Ham United | 1 February 2024 | Loan | 31 May 2024 |
| 30 | Kelly N'Mai | RM | (Netherlands) | | 1 May 2004 (age 22) | Academy | 1 July 2021 | Trainee | 30 June 2024 |
| 47 | Liam Humbles | CM | (England) | | 5 December 2003 (age 22) | Academy | 1 July 2023 | Trainee | 30 June 2024 |
| 52 | Jordan Fankwe | CM | (England) | | 9 January 2003 (age 23) | Watford | 27 July 2023 | Free | 30 June 2024 |
| 56 | Kyrell Malcom | CM | (England) | | | Academy | 24 November 2023 | Trainee | 30 June 2024 |
| —N/a | Alfie Henderson | CM | (England) | | | Academy | 1 January 2023 | Trainee | 30 June 2024 |
Forwards
| 9 | Callum Hendry | CF | (Scotland) | (England) Lytham St Annes | 8 December 1997 (age 28) | (Scotland) St Johnstone | 1 July 2022 | Free | 30 June 2024 |
| 11 | Connor McLennan | RW | (Scotland) | Peterhead | 5 October 1999 (age 27) | (Scotland) Aberdeen | 25 July 2023 | Free | 30 June 2024 |
| 17 | Matt Smith | CF | (England) | Birmingham | 7 June 1989 (age 37) | Millwall | 19 January 2022 | Undisclosed | 30 June 2024 |
| 18 | Conor McAleny | CF | (England) | Huyton | 12 August 1992 (age 34) | Oldham Athletic | 1 July 2021 | Free | 30 June 2025 |
| 39 | Callum Morton | CF | (England) | Torquay | 19 January 2000 (age 26) | Fleetwood Town | 13 January 2023 | Undisclosed | 30 June 2025 |
| 45 | Djavan Pedro | CF | (England) | | 5 December 2003 (age 22) | Academy | 1 July 2022 | Trainee | 30 June 2024 |
| 48 | Ben Collins | CM | (England) | | | Academy | 23 September 2023 | Trainee | 30 June 2024q |
| 51 | Sandro Da Costa | CF | (Republic of Ireland) | Galway | | FC United of Manchester | 31 July 2023 | Free | 30 June 2024 |
| 54 | Junior Luamba | CF | (England) | | 27 April 2003 (age 23) | Oldham Athletic | 29 September 2023 | Free | 30 June 2026 |
Out on Loan
| 23 | Kevin Berkoe | LB | (England) | | 5 July 2001 (age 25) | Oxford United | 29 September 2020 | Free | 30 June 2024 |
| 36 | Marcus Dackers | CF | (Wales) | | 9 January 2003 (age 23) | Brighton & Hove Albion | 1 July 2021 | Free | 30 June 2024 |
| 53 | Jacob Hamman | CM | (England) | | | Academy | 13 November 2023 | Trainee | 30 June 2024 |

== Transfers ==
=== In ===
| Date | Pos | Player | Transferred from | Fee | Ref |
|---|---|---|---|---|---|
| 30 June 2023 | CM | (England) Ossama Ashley | (England) Colchester United | Undisclosed | |
| 1 July 2023 | GK | (England) Alex Cairns | (England) Fleetwood Town | Free Transfer | |
| 1 July 2023 | LB | (England) Luke Garbutt | (England) Blackpool | Free Transfer | |
| 18 July 2023 | CB | (Jamaica) Curtis Tilt | (England) Wigan Athletic | Free Transfer | |
| 25 July 2023 | RW | (Scotland) Connor McLennan | (Scotland) Aberdeen | Free Transfer | |
| 27 July 2023 | RW | (England) Sandro Da Costa † | (England) FC United of Manchester | Free Transfer | |
| 27 July 2023 | CM | (England) Jordan Fankwe † | (England) Watford | Free Transfer | |
| 27 July 2023 | RB | (Republic of Ireland) Tosin Olopade † | (England) Burnley | Free Transfer | |
| 29 September 2023 | CF | (England) Junior Luamba † | (England) Oldham Athletic | Free Transfer | |
| 24 January 2024 | CM | (England) Jez Davies | (England) Burnley | Free Transfer | |

† Initially signed for the 'B team

=== Out ===
| Date | Pos | Player | Transferred to | Fee | Ref |
|---|---|---|---|---|---|
| 30 June 2023 | CB | (England) Ashley Eastham | Free agent | Released | |
| 30 June 2023 | DM | (England) Jason Lowe | (England) Port Vale | Released | |
| 30 June 2023 | CM | (Republic of Ireland) Shane McLoughlin | (Wales) Newport County | Released | |
| 30 June 2023 | RB | (England) James Melhado | (England) Truro City | Released | |
| 30 June 2023 | CB | (England) Richard Nartey | Free agent | Released | |
| 30 June 2023 | CB | (Republic of Ireland) Josh O'Brien | (Scotland) Hamilton Academical | Released | |
| 30 June 2023 | CF | (Republic of Ireland) Colin Oppong | (Northern Ireland) Glenavon | Released | |
| 30 June 2023 | CM | (England) Adam Porter | (England) Truro City | Released | |
| 30 June 2023 | CM | (Wales) Matt Sargent | (England) Radcliffe | Released | |
| 30 June 2023 | AM | (Angola) Elliot Simões | (Saudi Arabia) Al-Qaisumah | Released | |
| 30 June 2023 | LB | (The Gambia) Ibou Touray | (England) Stockport County | End of Contract | |
| 8 August 2023 | CB | (Wales) Ryan Leak | (Scotland) Ross County | Undisclosed | |
| 9 January 2023 | AM | (England) Odin Bailey | (England) Stockport County | Undisclosed | |
| 1 February 2024 | RB | (England) Luke Bolton | (Wales) Wrexham | Undisclosed | |

=== Loaned in ===
| Date | Pos | Player | Loaned from | Until | Ref |
|---|---|---|---|---|---|
| 25 July 2023 | GK | (England) Joe Wright | (England) Millwall | 8 January 2024 | |
| 1 September 2023 | RB | (England) Ethan Ingram | (England) West Bromwich Albion | End of Season | |
| 1 September 2023 | LB | (Wales) Declan John | (England) Bolton Wanderers | End of Season (Note: On 5 January, John's loan from Bolton was extended until the end of season.) | |
| 1 February 2024 | RM | (England) Daniel Chesters | (England) West Ham United | End of Season | |

=== Loaned out ===
| Date | Pos | Player | Loaned to | Until | Ref |
|---|---|---|---|---|---|
| 1 September 2023 | AM | (England) Odin Bailey | (England) Stockport County | 1 January 2024 | |
| 1 September 2023 | CF | (England) Callum Morton | (England) Forest Green Rovers | End of Season | |
| 24 November 2023 | CF | (Wales) Marcus Dackers | (England) Altrincham | 2 January 2024 | |
| 12 January 2024 | CF | (Wales) Marcus Dackers | (England) Southend United | End of Season | |
| 2 February 2024 | CM | (England) Jacob Hamman | (England) Nantwich Town | End of Season | |
| 9 February 2024 | CM | (England) Ben Collins | (England) Clitheroe | 9 March 2024 | |
| 8 March 2024 | LB | (England) Kevin Berkoe | (England) Woking | End of Season | |

== Pre-season and friendlies ==
On 26 May, the club announced their pre-season schedule, with friendlies against West Bromwich Albion, Bolton Wanderers, Radcliffe and AFC Fylde. A training camp in Alicante along with a friendly against Derby County was also confirmed. On July 10, a sixth pre-season friendly was confirmed, against Plymouth Argyle.

Win Draw Loss Fixtures

| 8 July 2023 Friendly | Radcliffe | 0–3 | Salford City | Radcliffe |
| 15:00 BST | | | Smith 24'; Trialist C 85'; McAleny 88' | Stadium: Neuven Stadium |

| 15 July 2023 Friendly | Salford City | 1–1 | Derby County | San Pedro del Pinatar, Spain |
| 12:00 CEST; 11:00 BST | Bailey 49' | | Mendez-Laing 58' | Stadium: Pinatar Arena |

| 19 July 2023 Friendly | Salford City | 2–2 | West Bromwich Albion | Kersal |
| 19:45 BST | Ashley 70'; Dackers 73' | | Gardner-Hickman 55', 58' | Stadium: Moor Lane |

| 22 July 2023 Friendly | Salford City | 1–2 | Bolton Wanderers | Kersal |
| 15:00 BST | Hendry 50' | Report | Thomason 73'; Morley 87' | Stadium: Moor Lane |

| 25 July 2023 Friendly | Plymouth Argyle | Cancelled | Salford City | Plymouth |
| 19:30 BST | | | | Stadium: Home Park |
Note: Fixture was cancelled due to Home Park being unplayable at the time.

| 29 July 2023 Friendly | AFC Fylde | 2–0 | Salford City | Medlar-with-Wesham |
| 15:00 BST | Barrett 21'; Haughton 30' | Report | | Stadium: Mill Farm Sports Village |

== Competitions ==
=== Overall record ===
| Competition | First match | Last match | Starting round | Final position | Record | | | | | | | |
| Competition | First match | Last match | Starting round | Final position | Pld | W | D | L | GF | GA | GD | Win % |
|---|---|---|---|---|---|---|---|---|---|---|---|---|
| League Two | 5 August | | Matchday 1 | | 39 | 11 | 11 | 17 | 58 | 72 | −14 | 28.21 |
| FA Cup | | | Third round | | 0 | 0 | 0 | 0 | 0 | 0 | +0 | — |
| EFL Cup | 8 August | 26 September | First round | Third round | 3 | 0 | 2 | 1 | 3 | 7 | −4 | 0.00 |
| EFL Trophy | 5 September | 31 October | Group stage | Group Stage | 1 | 0 | 0 | 1 | 0 | 3 | −3 | 0.00 |
| Total | | | | | 43 | 11 | 13 | 19 | 61 | 82 | −21 | 25.58 |

Last updated: 17 March 2024
Source: Soccerway

=== League Two ===
==== League table ====
| Pos | Team | Pld | W | D | L | GF | GA | GD | Pts | Promotion, qualification or relegation |
|---|---|---|---|---|---|---|---|---|---|---|
| 17 | Accrington Stanley | 46 | 16 | 9 | 21 | 63 | 71 | −8 | 57 | |
| 18 | Newport County | 46 | 16 | 7 | 23 | 62 | 76 | −14 | 55 | |
| 19 | Swindon Town | 46 | 14 | 12 | 20 | 77 | 83 | −6 | 54 | |
| 20 | Salford City | 46 | 13 | 12 | 21 | 66 | 82 | −16 | 51 | |
| 21 | Grimsby Town | 46 | 11 | 16 | 19 | 57 | 74 | −17 | 49 | |
| 22 | Colchester United | 46 | 11 | 12 | 23 | 59 | 80 | −21 | 45 | |
| 23 | Sutton United (R) | 46 | 9 | 15 | 22 | 59 | 84 | −25 | 42 | Relegated to National League |

Source: EFL Official Website
Rules for classification: 1) Points; 2) Goal difference; 3) Number of goals scored; 4) Head-to-head results; 5) Wins; 6) Away goals; 7) Penalty points (sec 9.5); 8) 12-point sending off offences
(R) Relegated

==== Results summary ====
| Overall | | | | | | | | Home | | | | | | Away | | | | | |
| Pld | W | D | L | GF | GA | GD | Pts | W | D | L | GF | GA | GD | W | D | L | GF | GA | GD |
|---|---|---|---|---|---|---|---|---|---|---|---|---|---|---|---|---|---|---|---|
| 46 | 13 | 12 | 21 | 66 | 82 | −16 | 51 | 5 | 8 | 10 | 37 | 46 | −9 | 8 | 4 | 11 | 29 | 36 | −7 |

Last updated: 27 April 2024.
Source: Soccerway

==== Results by round ====
| Round | 1 | 2 | 3 | 4 | 5 | 6 | 7 | 8 | 9 | 10 | 11 | 12 | 13 | 14 | 15 | 16 | 17 | 18 | 19 | 20 | 22 | 23 | 24 | 25 | 26 | 27 | 28 | 21^{1} | 30 | 31 | 32 | 33 | 34 | 35 | 29^{2} | 36 | 37 | 38 | 39 | 40 | 41 | 42 | 43 | 44 | 45 | 46 |
|---|---|---|---|---|---|---|---|---|---|---|---|---|---|---|---|---|---|---|---|---|---|---|---|---|---|---|---|---|---|---|---|---|---|---|---|---|---|---|---|---|---|---|---|---|---|---|
| Ground | A | H | A | A | H | A | H | H | A | H | A | H | A | H | A | A | H | A | H | A | H | A | H | H | A | H | A | A | A | H | A | H | H | A | H | H | A | H | H | A | H | A | A | H | A | H |
| Result | W | D | L | W | L | L | L | L | L | W | W | W | L | D | W | D | L | L | L | D | D | L | L | L | L | D | W | D | W | W | D | D | W | L | D | L | L | D | W | W | L | L | L | L | W | D |
| Position | 4 | 5 | 12 | 5 | 10 | 17 | 18 | 19 | 21 | 20 | 17 | 13 | 15 | 16 | 13 | 13 | 15 | 15 | 17 | 18 | 20 | 21 | 21 | 21 | 21 | 21 | 21 | 20 | 19 | 19 | 19 | 19 | 19 | 19 | 19 | 19 | 20 | 20 | 20 | 19 | 20 | 20 | 20 | 20 | 20 | 20 |

Updated to match(es) played on 27 April 2024. Source: Soccerway
A = Away; H = Home; W = Win; D = Draw; L = Loss; P = Postponed
Notes:
- ^{1} Matchday 21 (vs Bradford City) was postponed due to a waterlogged pitch.
- ^{2} Matchday 29 (vs Colchester United) was postponed due to a frozen pitch.

==== Matches ====
On 22 June, the EFL League Two fixtures were released.

Win Draw Loss Fixtures

| 5 August 2023 1 | Forest Green Rovers | 0–2 | Salford City | Nailsworth |
| 15:00 BST | McCann (yellow card) 43'; Robson (yellow card) 72'; Bunker (yellow card) 90' | Report | Hendry (yellow card) 17'; McAleny 52'; Garbutt (yellow card) 72'; Bolton (yellow card) 90+2'; Smith 90+5' | Stadium: The New Lawn; Attendance: 1,936; Referee: Daniel Middleton |

| 12 August 2023 2 | Salford City | 1–1 | Crawley Town | Kersal |
| 15:00 BST | McAleny 47'; McLennan (yellow card) 72' | Report | Conroy (yellow card) 31'; Garbutt 40' (o.g.); Kelly (yellow card) 64'; Gordon (yellow card) 77'; Ransom (yellow card) 82' | Stadium: Moor Lane; Attendance: 2,255; Referee: Martin Coy |

| 15 August 2023 3 | Grimsby Town | 2–0 | Salford City | Cleethorpes |
| 19:45 BST | Eisa 20', 65' | Report | Ashley (yellow card) 33' (yellow-red card) 49'; Lund (yellow card) 70'; Mallan (yellow card) 73'; Vassell (yellow card) 90+3' | Stadium: Blundell Park; Attendance: 5,968; Referee: Peter Wright |

| 19 August 2023 4 | Tranmere Rovers | 3–4 | Salford City | Birkenhead |
| 15:00 BST | Jennings 6'; Dennis 36'; Jolley 87'; Turnbull (yellow card) 90+5' | Report | Lund (yellow card) 9'; Smith 34'; Hendry 46', 68' (yellow card) 70' (goal) 85' | Stadium: Prenton Park; Attendance: 9,594; Referee: Scott Tallis |

| 26 August 2023 5 | Salford City | 1–2 | Accrington Stanley | Kersal |
| 15:00 BST | Garbutt (yellow card) 20'; Tilt (yellow card) 39'; Watson 88' (pen.); Hendry (yellow card) 89' | Report | Whalley 24'; Andrews (yellow card) 35' (goal) 45'; Rich-Baghuelou (yellow card) 38'; Conneely (yellow card) 87' | Stadium: Moor Lane; Attendance: 2,520; Referee: Charles Breakspear |

| 2 September 2023 6 | Morecambe | 1–0 | Salford City | Morecambe |
| 15:00 BST | Mellon 25' | Report | Lund (red card) 90+5' | Stadium: Mazuma Stadium; Attendance: 3,458; Referee: Will Finnie |

| 9 September 2023 7 | Salford City | 1–2 | Walsall | Kersal |
| 15:00 BST | Smith 15'; Mallan (yellow card) 56'; Ashley (yellow card) 75' | Report | Draper 59'; Stirk (yellow card) 76'; McEntee 77' | Stadium: Moor Lane; Attendance: 2,847; Referee: Paul Howard |

| 15 September 2023 8 | Salford City | 0–2 | Notts County | Kersal |
| 19:45 BST | Ingram (yellow card) 76'; McAleny (yellow card) 84'; Watt (yellow card) 86'; Berkoe (yellow card) 87' (yellow-red card) 90+3' | Report | McGoldrick 37'; Crowley 63' (yellow card) 68'; O'Brien (yellow card) 82'; Nemane (yellow card) 88' (yellow-red card) 90+1' | Stadium: Moor Lane; Attendance: 3,633; Referee: Scott Simpson |

| 23 September 2023 9 | Harrogate Town | 3–2 | Salford City | Harrogate |
| 15:00 BST | Thomson 16' (pen.); Folarin 23'; McDonald (yellow card) 74'; *Odoh 80'; Sutton (yellow card) 84' | Report | Watt (yellow card) 18'; Tilt 29'; Smith 58'; *McAleny (yellow card) 66' | Stadium: Wetherby Road; Attendance: 2,303; Referee: Ben Atkinson |

| 30 September 2023 10 | Salford City | 2–1 | Newport County | Kersal |
| 15:00 BST | Lund 25'; Tilt (yellow card) 41'; Drysdale 45+6' (o.g.) | Report | Wildig (yellow card) 5'; Morris 31' (yellow card) 56'; Evans (yellow card) 61' | Stadium: Moor Lane; Attendance: 2,006; Referee: Seb Stockbridge |

| 3 October 2023 11 | Sutton United | 0–2 | Salford City | Sutton |
| 19:45 BST | Kizzi (yellow card) 12' | Report | Smith (yellow card) 23' (goal) 54'; Bolton (yellow card) 44'; N'Mai 65'; Lund (yellow card) 77' | Stadium: Gander Green Lane; Attendance: 2,031; Referee: Lee Swabey |

| 7 October 2023 12 | Salford City | 4–2 | Crewe Alexandra | Kersal |
| 15:00 BST | Ingram (yellow card) 35'; Smith 45+3', 58'; Watt (yellow card) 68'; Watson 71'; Berkoe 90+1' | Report | Baker-Richardson 27' (yellow card) 38' (goal) 90+3'; O'Riordan (yellow card) 59' | Stadium: Moor Lane; Attendance: 3,025; Referee: Thomas Kirk |

| 14 October 2023 13 | Wrexham | 3–2 | Salford City | Wrexham |
| 15:00 BST | Lee 39' (McClean); Jones (yellow card) 45+2'; O'Connell (yellow card) 75'; Mullin (yellow card) 80'; Fletcher 88'; Davies 89' (Dalby) | Report | Smith 36' (Lund); Ingram (yellow card) 45+1'; Tilt (yellow card) 45+2'; Shephard (yellow card) 60'; Bolton (yellow card) 81' | Stadium: Racecourse Ground; Attendance: 9,771; Referee: Ben Toner |

| 21 October 2023 14 | Salford City | 2–2 | Swindon Town | Kersal |
| 15:00 BST | Ingram 7'; Watt (yellow card) 15'; Smith (yellow card) 34'; Lund (yellow card) 76'; Tilt (red card) 84'; Humbles 90+5' | Report | Hutton 11'; Brewitt (yellow card) 12'; Austin 85' (pen.) | Stadium: Moor Lane; Attendance: 2,523; Referee: Lewis Smith |

| 24 October 2023 15 | Doncaster Rovers | 0–3 | Salford City | Doncaster |
| 19:45 GMT | | Report | Smith 1', 26', 77'; Ingram (yellow card) 40'; Mariappa (yellow card) 44' | Stadium: Eco-Power Stadium; Attendance: 5,861; Referee: Neil Hair |

| 28 October 2023 16 | Barrow | 0–0 | Salford City | Barrow-in-Furness |
| 15:00 BST | Gotts (yellow card) 2'; Spence (yellow card) 31' | Report | | Stadium: Holker Street; Attendance: 3,053; Referee: Jacob Miles |

| 11 November 2023 17 | Salford City | 1–2 | Mansfield Town | Kersal |
| 15:00 BST | Smith 22'; Ingram (yellow card) 87' | Report | Bowery 19'; Reed (yellow card) 31'; Keillor-Dunn 37'; Macdonald (yellow card) 44' | Stadium: Moor Lane; Attendance: 3,281; Referee: Ross Joyce |

| 18 November 2023 18 | Gillingham | 3–1 | Salford City | Gillingham |
| 15:00 GMT | Mahoney 22'; Clark (yellow card) 26'; Nichols 54' (yellow card) 76'; Jefferies 62' | Report | Smith 37'; Mallan (yellow card) 44' | Stadium: Priestfield Stadium; Attendance: 6,431; Referee: Paul Howard |

| 25 November 2023 19 | Salford City | 2–4 | Milton Keynes Dons | Kersal |
| 15:00 GMT | Lund (yellow card) 33'; N'Mai 36'; Watson 45+2' (pen.); Mariappa (yellow card) 64' | Report | Dean 10'; Tomlinson 50', 72' (yellow card) 73'; Williams (yellow card) 67'; Harrison 88' | Stadium: Moor Lane; Attendance: 2,508; Referee: Scott Jackson |

| 28 November 2023 20 | Stockport County | 0–0 | Salford City | Stockport |
| 19:45 GMT | Croasdale (yellow card) 61'; Southam-Hales (yellow card) 76' | Report | Tilt (yellow card) 34'; N'Mai (yellow card) 58' | Stadium: Edgeley Park; Attendance: 8,790; Referee: Ollie Yates |

| 16 December 2023 22 | Salford City | 0–0 | AFC Wimbledon | Kersal |
| 15:00 GMT | N'Mai (yellow card) 71'; Garbutt (yellow card) 88' | Report | Reeves (yellow card) 9' | Stadium: Moor Lane; Attendance: 2,338; Referee: Ben Speedie |

| 22 December 2023 23 | Colchester United | 2–1 | Salford City | Colchester |
| 19:45 GMT | Read (yellow card) 17'; Hall (yellow card) 29'; Taylor (yellow card) 31', (goal) 42'; Mitchell (yellow card) 74'; Cooper 89'; Akinde (yellow card) 90+3' | Report | Ingram (yellow card) 38'; McAleny 90+1' | Stadium: Colchester Community Stadium; Attendance: 3,560; Referee: Will Finnie |

| 26 December 2023 24 | Salford City | 1–5 | Tranmere Rovers | Kersal |
| 15:00 GMT | Watt (yellow card) 45+2'; McAleny (yellow card) 45+3' (yellow-red card) 72'; Lund 55'; Smith (yellow card) 87'; Garbutt (yellow card) 90+4' | Report | Saunders 12'; Morris 35'; Turnbull (yellow card) 45'; Jennings 50'; Hendry 64'; Hawkes 90+3' | Stadium: Moor Lane; Attendance: 4,576; Referee: Ben Toner |

| 29 December 2023 25 | Salford City | 0–3 | Grimsby Town | Kersal |
| 19:45 GMT | | Report | Clifton 39'; Mullarkey 70'; Rose 84', (yellow card) 86' | Stadium: Moor Lane; Attendance: 2,921; Referee: Dale Baines |

| 1 January 2024 26 | Accrington Stanley | 3–0 | Salford City | Accrington |
| 15:00 GMT | Whalley 14'; Gubbins (yellow card) 17'; Nolan 33' (pen.), 40'; Martin (yellow card) 45+3'; J. Woods (yellow card) 67'; B. Woods (yellow card) 86' | Report | Bolton (yellow card) 64'; Tilt (yellow card) 67' | Stadium: Crown Ground; Attendance: 2,735; Referee: Matthew Corlett |

| 6 January 2024 27 | Salford City | 2–2 | Forest Green Rovers | Kersal |
| 15:00 GMT | Smith 4'; Watt (yellow card) 21'; Garbutt (yellow card) 41'; Mariappa (yellow card) 72' (yellow-red card) 90'; Watson 90+1' (pen.) | Report | Bunker (yellow card) 23'; McCann 39'; Inniss (yellow card) 59' (yellow-red card) 90'; Stevens 70'; Dabo (yellow card) 88' | Stadium: Moor Lane; Attendance: 2,355; Referee: Charles Breakspear |

| 13 January 2024 28 | Crawley Town | 0–1 | Salford City | Crawley |
| 15:00 GMT | Williams (yellow card) 34' | Report | Garbutt (yellow card) 13'; Vassell (yellow card) 37'; Bolton (yellow card) 68'; N'Mai 80' | Stadium: Broadfield Stadium; Attendance: 2,970; Referee: Declan Bourne |

| 23 January 2024 21 | Bradford City | 1–1 | Salford City | Bradford |
| 19:45 GMT | Halliday 20' | Report | Watt (yellow card) 13'; Watson 14' | Stadium: Valley Parade; Referee: Martin Woods |
Note: Fixture was initially scheduled for 9 December, but was postponed due to a waterlogged pitch.

| 27 January 2024 30 | Crewe Alexandra | 2–3 | Salford City | Crewe |
| 15:00 GMT | Rowe (yellow card) 27' (goal) 44'; Nevitt 45+2' | Report | Smith 4', 55', 85'; John (yellow card) 23'; Garbutt (yellow card) 40'; Lund (yellow card) 89'; Hendry (yellow card) 90+4' | Stadium: Gresty Road; Attendance: 4,938; Referee: Stephen Parkinson |

| 3 February 2024 31 | Salford City | 3–1 | Wrexham | Kersal |
| 15:00 GMT | Vassell 6'; Watt 16'; Smith 56' | Report | Dalby 41' | Stadium: Moor Lane; Attendance: 4,591; Referee: Alex Chilowicz |

| 10 February 2024 32 | Swindon Town | 1–1 | Salford City | Swindon |
| 15:00 GMT | Khan (yellow card) 24'; Glatzel (yellow card) 39'; Godwin-Malife (yellow card) 53'; McEachran 82' | Report | Hendry 90+2' | Stadium: The County Ground; Attendance: 8,272; Referee: Darren Drysdale |

| 13 February 2024 33 | Salford City | 2–2 | Doncaster Rovers | Kersal |
| 19:45 GMT | Wood 14' (o.g.); Watt (yellow card) 55'; Luamba (yellow card) 56'; Tilt (yellow card) 61'; Garbutt (yellow card) 63' (goal) 89' | Report | Tilt 12' (o.g.); Craig (yellow card) 64'; Adelakun 71'; Bailey (yellow card) 74' | Stadium: Moor Lane; Attendance: 2,592; Referee: Martin Woods |

| 17 February 2024 34 | Salford City | 5–3 | Barrow | Kersal |
| 15:00 GMT | Hendry 26', 67'; Luamba (yellow card) 40'; Watt (yellow card) 54'; McAleny 57'; John (yellow card) 62'; Smith 77', 86' | Report | Stockton 42', 90'; Warren 47'; Worrall (yellow card) 87' | Stadium: Moor Lane; Attendance: 3,416; Referee: Sunny Sukhvir Gill |

| 24 February 2024 35 | Mansfield Town | 5–1 | Salford City | Mansfield |
| 15:00 GMT | Cargill (yellow card) 17', (goal) 45+8'; Swan 18'; Keillor-Dunn 57'; Akins 81'; Reed (yellow card) 90+5'; Boateng 90+8' | Report | Luamba 42'; Watson (yellow card) 48'; Vassell (red card) 73'; Lund (yellow card) 74'; Garbutt (yellow card) 87' | Stadium: Field Mill; Attendance: 7,166; Referee: Craig Hicks |

| 27 February 2024 29 | Salford City | 1–1 | Colchester United | Kersal |
| 19:45 GMT | Smith 45'; Morton (yellow card) 74'; Mariappa (yellow card) 83'; Humbles (yellow card) 88'; Ingram (yellow card) 90+3' | Report | Iandolo (yellow card) 45+3'; Ihionvien 75'; Hall (yellow card) 90+4' | Stadium: Moor Lane; Attendance: 2,438; Referee: Kirsty Dowle |
Note: Fixture was originally scheduled for 29 January, but was postponed due to a frozen pitch.

| 2 March 2024 36 | Salford City | 0–2 | Gillingham | Kersal |
| 15:00 GMT | Ingram (yellow card) 17'; Tilt (yellow card) 35'; Cairns (yellow card) 52' | Report | Masterson (yellow card) 36'; Ogie 43'; Dieng 51' | Stadium: Moor Lane; Attendance: 2,995; Referee: Ross Joyce |

| 9 March 2024 37 | Milton Keynes Dons | 3–1 | Salford City | Milton Keynes |
| 15:00 GMT | Lofthouse 27'; Gilbey 31'; Tezgel 45+7'; Harrison (yellow card) 74'; Bate (yellow card) 74' | Report | Smith 12', (yellow card) 54'; McLennan (yellow card) 20'; McAleny (yellow card) 71'; Vassell (yellow card) 74'; Lund (yellow card) 82' | Stadium: Stadium MK; Attendance: 6,544; Referee: Dean Whitestone |

| 14 March 2024 38 | Salford City | 2–2 | Stockport County | Kersal |
| 20:00 GMT | Garbutt 8' (yellow card) 25'; Tilt 39'; Luamba (yellow card) 45+5'; Watson (yellow card) 66'; John (yellow card) 71' | Report | Horsfall (yellow card) 49'; Touray 51' (yellow card) 77'; Olaofe 64' | Stadium: Moor Lane; Attendance: 3,827; Referee: Ollie Yates |
Note: Fixture was initially scheduled for 12 March, but was moved back for live Sky Sports coverage.

| 17 March 2024 39 | Salford City | 3–1 | Morecambe | Kersal |
| 14:00 GMT | McLennan 13', (yellow card) 86'; Hendry 50'; Tilt 79' | Report | Vassell 61' (o.g.); Garner (yellow card) 34' | Stadium: Moor Lane; Referee: Sam Purkiss |
Note: Fixture was initially scheduled for 16 March, but was moved due to the Stockport home game being rescheduled.

| 23 March 2024 40 | Notts County | 1–2 | Salford City | Nottingham |
| 15:00 GMT | Crowley 53' | Report | McAleny 31', 87', (yellow card) 80'; Mariappa (yellow card) 49'; Hendry (yellow card) 54' | Stadium: Meadow Lane; Attendance: 9,967; Referee: Adam Herczeg |

| 29 March 2024 41 | Salford City | 1–2 | Sutton United | Kersal |
| 15:00 GMT | Watson 50'; Vassell (yellow card) 90' | Report | Smith (yellow card) 20'; Sanderson 45+2', 63' (yellow card) 56'; N'Guessan (yellow card) 88'; Beautyman (yellow card) 90+4' | Stadium: Moor Lane; Attendance: 2,983; Referee: Paul Howard |

| 1 April 2024 42 | Walsall | 2–1 | Salford City | Bescot |
| 15:00 BST | Matt 9'; Faal 90+2' | Report | Garbutt (yellow card) 41'; Mariappa (yellow card) 50'; Lund 61' | Stadium: Bescot Stadium; Attendance: 6,189; Referee: Daniel Middleton |

| 6 April 2024 43 | AFC Wimbledon | 1–0 | Salford City | Wimbledon |
| 15:00 GMT | Bugiel 70'; Johnson (yellow card) 81'; Brown (yellow card) 90+6'; Neufville (yellow card) 90+7' | Report | McAleny (yellow card) 7'; McLennan (yellow card) 24'; Watt (yellow card) 32' (yellow-red card) 90+9'; Garbutt (yellow card) 33'; Watson (yellow card) 45+2'; Lund (yellow card) 45+5'; Tilt (yellow card) 65'; Vassell (red card) 90+9' | Stadium: Plough Lane; Attendance: 7,749; Referee: Ben Atkinson |

| 13 April 2024 44 | Salford City | 1–2 | Bradford City | Kersal |
| 15:00 BST | Hendry 18'; Chesters (yellow card) 33'; Lund (yellow card) 36'; Smith (yellow card) 87' | Report | Platt (yellow card) 22'; Kavanagh 45+3', (yellow card) 77'; Tomkinson (yellow card) 83'; Halliday 86' | Stadium: Moor Lane; Attendance: 3,517; Referee: Jacob Miles |

| 20 April 2024 45 | Newport County | 0–1 | Salford City | Newport |
| 15:00 BST | Jameson (yellow card) 13'; Morris (yellow card) 42' | Report | Hendry (yellow card) 14'; McLennan (yellow card) 41'; Luamba (yellow card) 66'; Smith 90+2' | Stadium: Rodney Parade; Attendance: 4,423; Referee: Edward Duckworth |

| 27 April 2024 46 | Salford City | 2–2 | Harrogate Town | Kersal |
| 15:00 BST | Hendry 5'; Watson 33' | Report | Mcdonald (yellow card) 17'; Odoh 27'; Sims (yellow card) 34'; Folds 45+2' | Stadium: Moor Lane; Attendance: 2,922; Referee: David Rock |

=== FA Cup ===
Salford were drawn away to Peterborough United in the first round.

Win Draw Loss Fixtures

| 4 November 2023 First round | Peterborough United | 2–2 | Salford City | Peterborough |
| 15:00 GMT | Katongo (yellow card) 7'; Jones 47'; Fernandez 90+3' | Report | Mallan 5'; Garbutt (yellow card) 36'; Sturge 69' (o.g.); N'Mai (yellow card) 81' | Stadium: London Road Stadium; Attendance: 4,066; Referee: Sam Purkiss |

| 14 November 2023 First round replay | Salford City | 4–4 (a.e.t.) (4–5 p) | Peterborough United | Kersal |
| 19:45 GMT | Tilt 4', 54'; Knight 61' (o.g.); Garbutt (yellow card) 90+5'; Mallan 104' | Report | Randall 16'; Mason-Clark 18'; Collins 45+1' (yellow card) 59'; Crichlow (yellow card) 82'; Clarke-Harris 120+3' | Stadium: Moor Lane; Attendance: 1,030; Referee: Darren Drysdale |
| | Penalties |
| | Watson (penalty scored); Mallan (penalty scored); Dackers (penalty missed); Garbutt (penalty scored); Watt (penalty missed); Lund (penalty scored); McLennan (penalty missed) | | Clarke-Harris (penalty scored); Poku (penalty scored); Mason-Clark (penalty missed); Wakeling (penalty missed); Ajiboye (penalty scored); Dornelly (penalty scored); Collins (penalty scored) |

=== EFL Cup ===
Salford were drawn away to Preston North End in the first round and then at home to Leeds United in the second round and Burnley in the third round.

Win Draw Loss Fixtures

| 8 August 2023 First round | Preston North End | 2–2 (2–4 p) | Salford City | Preston |
| 19:45 BST | Woodburn 44'; Holmes (yellow card) 50' (goal) 50'; Best (yellow card) 90+7' | Report | McLennan 5', 38' (yellow card) 27'; Cairns (yellow card) 80' | Stadium: Deepdale; Attendance: 6,790; Referee: Tom Reeves |
| | Penalties |
| | Ledson (penalty missed); Keane (penalty scored); Best (penalty scored); Frøkjær-Jensen (penalty missed) | | Smith (penalty scored); McAleny (penalty scored); Mallan (penalty scored); Garbutt (penalty scored) |

| 29 August 2023 Second round | Salford City | 1–1 (9–8 p) | Leeds United | Kersal |
| 19:45 BST | Smith 34' | Report | Struijk 76' | Stadium: Moor Lane; Attendance: 3,147; Referee: Oliver Langford |
| | Penalties |
| | Mallan (penalty scored); McAleny (penalty scored); Watson (penalty scored); Dackers (penalty scored); McLennan (penalty missed); Lund (penalty scored); Bolton (penalty scored); Mariappa (penalty scored); Tilt (penalty scored); Ashley (penalty scored) | | Greenwood (penalty scored); Struijk (penalty scored); Rutter (penalty missed); Gnonto (penalty scored); Sinisterra (penalty scored); Hjelde (penalty scored); Cresswell (penalty scored); Ampadu (penalty scored); Summerville (penalty scored); Shackleton (penalty missed) |
Note: Live on Sky Sports

| 26 September 2023 Third round | Salford City | 0–4 | Burnley | Kersal |
| 19:45 BST | Olopade (yellow card) 44' | Report | Berge 12'; Bruun Larsen 20'; O'Shea 37'; Rodriguez (yellow card) 78'; Odobert 81' | Stadium: Moor Lane; Attendance: 3,305; Referee: Anthony Backhouse |

=== EFL Trophy ===
In the group stage, Salford were drawn alongside Bolton Wanderers, Stockport County and Manchester United U21.

| Pos | Div | Team | Pld | W | PW | PL | L | GF | GA | GD | Pts | Qualification |
|---|---|---|---|---|---|---|---|---|---|---|---|---|
| 1 | L1 | Bolton Wanderers | 3 | 3 | 0 | 0 | 0 | 13 | 1 | +12 | 9 | Advance to Round 2 |
| 2 | L2 | Stockport County | 3 | 1 | 0 | 1 | 1 | 4 | 4 | 0 | 4 | Advance to Round 2 |
| 3 | L2 | Salford City | 3 | 1 | 0 | 0 | 2 | 5 | 9 | −4 | 3 | |
| 4 | ACA | Manchester United U21 | 3 | 0 | 1 | 0 | 2 | 5 | 13 | −8 | 2 | |

Updated to match(es) played on 14 November 2023. Source: EFL.com

Win Draw Loss Fixtures

| 5 September 2023 Group stage | Bolton Wanderers | 3–0 | Salford City | Horwich |
| 19:45 BST | Mendes Gomes 1'; Santos 12'; Morley 53'; Matheson (yellow card) 90+7' | Report | Berkoe (yellow card) 45' | Stadium: Toughsheet Community Stadium; Attendance: 2,983; Referee: Aaron Jackson |

| 10 October 2023 Group stage | Salford City | 1–3 | Stockport County | Kersal |
| 19:30 BST | Dackers 3'; Mallan (yellow card) 16'; Pedro (yellow card) 29' | | Madden 20' (pen.), 52', 67'; Pond (yellow card) 72' | Stadium: Moor Lane |

| 31 October 2023 Group stage | Salford City | 4–3 | Manchester United U21 | Kersal |
| 19:30 GMT | McAleny 24' (yellow card) 55'; Lund 27' (yellow card) 58' (goal) 87' (pen.), 90+5' (pen.); Collins (yellow card) 37'; Da Costa (yellow card) 42' | Report | Shoretire 7' (yellow card) 45+5' (goal) 51'; Collyer (yellow card) 45+3'; Forson 47'; Bennett (yellow card) 90+4' | Stadium: Moor Lane; Attendance: 1,799; Referee: David Rock |
