= Will Wright (footballer, born 2008) =

English footballer (born 2008)

Personal information
- Full name: William Stephen Wright
- Date of birth: 3 April 2008 (age 18)
- Place of birth: Preston, Lancashire, England
- Height: 6 ft 4 in (1.93 m)
- Position: Striker

Team information
- Current team: Liverpool
- Number: 79

Youth career
- –2025: Salford City
- 2025–: Liverpool

Senior career*
Years	Team	Apps	(Gls)
2025	Salford City	2	(0)
2026–	Liverpool	0	(0)
- * Club domestic league appearances and goals as of 15:21, 30 December 2025 (UTC)

Will Wright (born 3 April 2008) is an English professional footballer who plays as a striker for Premier League club Liverpool.

== Career ==
He played for Salford City as a youngster, playing for their under-18s and B side for whom he was a prolific goal scorer. He made an appearance in November 2024 as a 16 year-old during an EFL Trophy match against Wolverhampton Wanderers under-21s prior to making his senior debut in January 2025 in the FA Cup against Manchester City in an 8–0 defeat. He went on to make two appearances in EFL League Two during the 2024–25 season.

He joined Premier League club Liverpool in the summer of 2025, for an initial fee reported as £200,000. He had also received an offer to join Arsenal. He made his debut for the Liverpool under-21 side in August 2025. A few days after signing he made his senior debut in a pre-season match against Athletic Bilbao at Anfield on 4 August 2025. Wright scored consecutive away hat-tricks against LASK and Fenerbahçe for Liverpool U19 in the UEFA Youth League during the 2026–27 season.

== Career statistics ==
As of match played 2 September 2025

Appearances and goals by club, season and competition
Club	Season	League			FA Cup		EFL Cup		Continental		Other		Total	
Club	Season	Division	Apps	Goals	Apps	Goals	Apps	Goals	Apps	Goals	Apps	Goals	Apps	Goals
Salford City	2024–25	League Two	2	0	1	0	0	0	—		1 (Note: Appearance(s) in EFL Trophy)	0	4	0
Liverpool	2025–26	Premier League	0	0	0	0	0	0	0	0	0	0	0	0
Liverpool U21	2025–26	—			—		—		—		1	0	1	0
Career total			2	0	1	0	0	0	0	0	2	0	5	0
