= Curtis Tilt =

Footballer (born 1991)

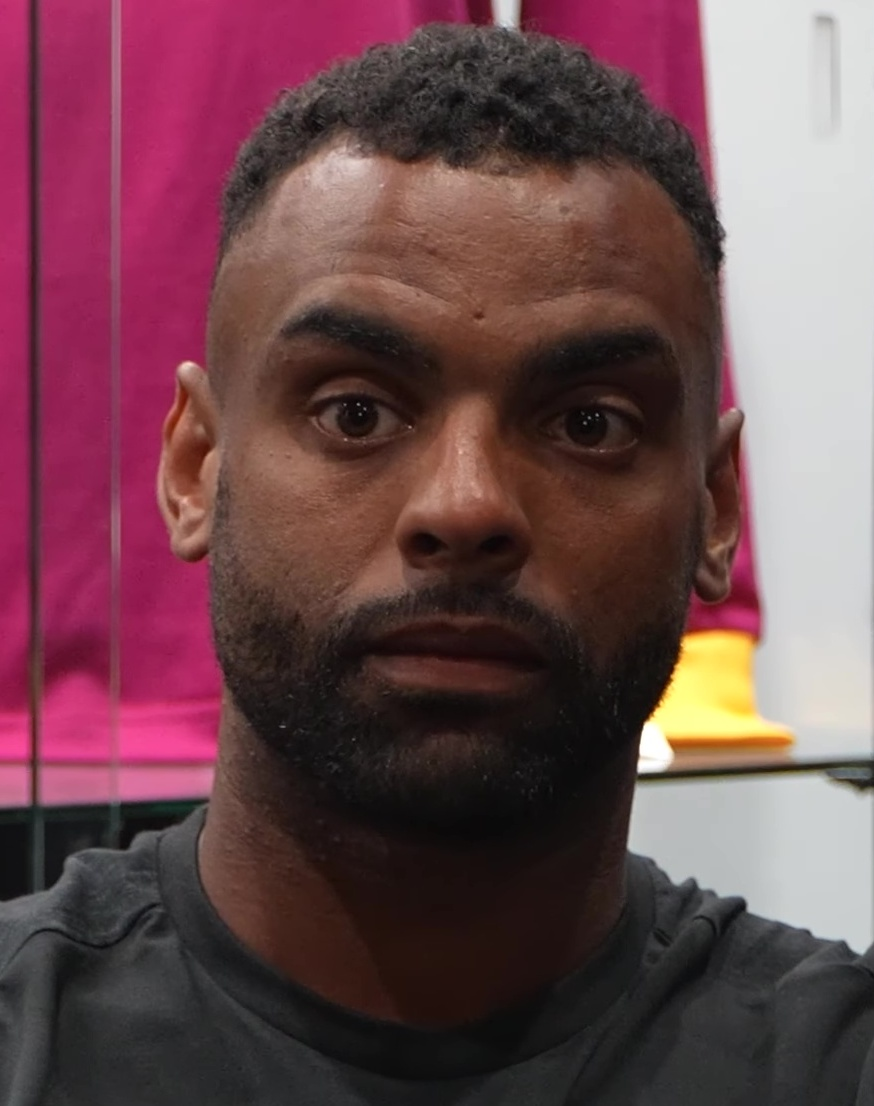
- Tilt in 2025.

Personal information
- Full name: Curtis Anthony Tilt
- Date of birth: 4 August 1991 (age 35)
- Place of birth: Walsall, England
- Height: 6 ft 2 in (1.89 m)
- Position: Centre-back

Team information
- Current team: Burton Albion
- Number: 16

Senior career*
Years	Team	Apps	(Gls)
2012–2013	Gornal Athletic		
2013	Tipton Town		
2013–2015	Halesowen Town		
2015	Hednesford Town	7	(2)
2015–2016	AFC Telford United	31	(0)
2016–2017	Wrexham	36	(1)
2017	→ Forest Green Rovers (loan)	7	(0)
2017–2020	Blackpool	99	(5)
2020–2022	Rotherham United	1	(0)
2020–2021	→ Wigan Athletic (loan)	13	(0)
2021	→ Wigan Athletic (loan)	23	(3)
2021–2022	→ Wigan Athletic (loan)	8	(2)
2022–2023	Wigan Athletic	38	(1)
2023–2025	Salford City	82	(4)
2025–2026	Bradford City	32	(0)
2026–	Burton Albion	15	(1)

International career^{‡}
2021	Jamaica	2	(0)
- * Club domestic league appearances and goals as of 11:26, 22 November 2026 (UTC) ‡ National team caps and goals as of 18:42, 1 September 2022 (UTC)

Curtis Anthony Tilt (born 4 August 1991) is a professional footballer who plays as a centre-back for EFL League One club Burton Albion. Born in England, he represented Jamaica at international level.

== Club career ==
=== Early career ===
Born in Walsall, Tilt was working in a quarry and had largely stopped playing football when he was spotted by Gornal Athletic playing in a tournament organised by Sporting Khalsa. After one season with Gornal he left to join Tipton Town in the summer of 2013, but then moved on again to Halesowen Town in September of the same year. After two seasons with Halesowen, Tilt moved on to Hednesford Town in 2015, before signing for Wrexham in June 2016, and moving on loan to Forest Green Rovers in March 2017. He signed for Blackpool in June 2017.

Tilt signed for Rotherham United on 31 January 2020 for an undisclosed fee.

In October 2020 Tilt moved on loan to Wigan Athletic. On 30 January 2021, he rejoined Wigan Athletic on loan for the remainder of the 2020–21 season. He scored his first goal for Wigan in a 3–2 loss to AFC Wimbledon on 6 February 2021.

He re-joined Wigan Athletic for a third loan spell on loan on 31 August 2021. Although the loan was originally until the end of the season, Rotherham exercised the option to recall in the January transfer window on 14 January 2021. He returned to Wigan later that month on a permanent deal.

On 18 July 2023, Tilt signed for League Two club Salford City on a two-year deal. He was offered a new contract at the end of the 2024–25 season.

=== Bradford City ===
On 4 June 2025, Tilt agreed to join newly promoted League One side Bradford City on a two-year deal from 1 July. Tilt defended himself after some fans criticised the signing due to his age, at 33. Tilt later praised the club's pre-season preparations. In September 2025 he underwent hamstring surgery and was ruled out for a number of months. In October it was confirmed that he would remain out-of-action for a few more months.

He returned to action in January 2026, saying he was grateful for the time to recover, nothing that the club's good firm made them a target for other teams. Later that month, Tilt suffered racist abuse in the West Yorkshire derby away at Huddersfield, with a man later being arrested.

In March 2026, Tilt spoke about the players' battling attributes as they sought promotion through the playoffs.

=== Burton Albion ===
After one season with Bradford, Tilt signed for Burton Albion on 29 June 2026 for an undisclosed fee. He wanted to return to the Midlands for family reasons.

== International career ==
In March 2021, he was one of six English-born players to receive their first call-up to the Jamaica national team. On 25 March 2021, he made his Jamaica debut when he came on in the 64th minute of a 4–1 defeat to the United States. Tilt said that playing for Jamaica was the proudest moment of his career.

== Personal life ==
Tilt was born in England and is of Jamaican descent.

== Career statistics ==
=== Club ===
As of matched played on 21 November 2026

Appearances and goals by club, season and competition
Club	Season	League			FA Cup		EFL Cup		Other		Total	
Club	Season	Division	Apps	Goals	Apps	Goals	Apps	Goals	Apps	Goals	Apps	Goals
Hednesford Town	2015–16	National League North	7	2	0	0	—		0	0	7	2
Telford United	2015–16	National League North	31	0	0	0	—		1 (Note: Appearance(s) in the FA Trophy)	0	32	0
Wrexham	2016–17	National League	36	1	1	0	—		1	0	38	1
Forest Green Rovers (loan)	2016–17	National League	7	0	—		—		0	0	7	0
Blackpool	2017–18	League One	42	1	0	0	0	0	3	0	45	1
Blackpool	2018–19	League One	37	4	3	0	2	0	0	0	42	4
Blackpool	2019–20	League One	20	0	2	0	0	0	2 (Note: Appearance(s) in the EFL Trophy)	0	24	0
Blackpool	Total		99	5	5	0	2	0	5	0	111	5
Rotherham United	2019–20	League One	1	0	0	0	0	0	0	0	1	0
Rotherham United	2020–21	Championship	0	0	0	0	0	0	—		0	0
Rotherham United	2021–22	League One	0	0	0	0	0	0	0	0	0	0
Rotherham United	Total		1	0	0	0	0	0	0	0	1	0
Wigan Athletic (loan)	2020–21	League One	36	3	0	0	0	0	—		36	3
Wigan Athletic (loan)	2021–22	League One	8	2	1	0	1	0	2	0	12	2
Wigan Athletic	2021–22	League One	12	0	0	0	0	0	0	0	12	0
Wigan Athletic	2022–23	Championship	26	1	2	0	0	0	—		28	1
Wigan Athletic	Total		38	1	2	0	0	0	0	0	40	1
Salford City	2023–24	League Two	45	3	2	2	3	0	1	0	51	5
Salford City	2024–25	League Two	37	1	3	0	1	0	0	0	41	1
Salford City	Total		82	4	5	2	4	0	1	0	92	6
Bradford City	2025–26	League One	32	0	0	0	1	0	2 (Note: Appearances in the play-offs)	0	35	0
Burton Albion	2026–27	League One	15	1	1	0	1	0	0	0	17	1
Career total			392	19	15	2	9	0	12	0	428	21

=== International ===
As of 1 September 2022

Appearances and goals by national team and year
National Team	Year	Apps	Goals
Jamaica	2021	2	0
Total		2	0

== Honours ==
Wigan Athletic

- EFL League One: 2021–22
