= Sandro Da Costa =

Irish footballer (born 2003)

Personal information
- Full name: Sandro Manuel Ashley Galego Da Costa
- Date of birth: 14 December 2003 (age 22)
- Place of birth: Galway, Ireland
- Position: Forward

Youth career
- FC United of Manchester

Senior career*
Years	Team	Apps	(Gls)
2021–2023	FC United of Manchester	6	(0)
2021–2022	→ Longridge Town (loan)		
2022	→ Darwen (dual-registration)		
2023–	Salford City	2	(0)
2024	→ Warrington Rylands (loan)	2	(0)
2025	→ Bamber Bridge (loan)	2	(0)
2025–	→ Hyde United (loan)	0	(0)
- * Club domestic league appearances and goals as of 12:10, 30 March 2025 (UTC)

Sandro Manuel Ashley Galego Da Costa (born 14 December 2003) is an Irish footballer who plays as a forward for Hyde United on loan from EFL League Two club Salford City.

== Career ==
Da Costa started his career with FC United of Manchester, graduating through the academy, joining the first-team ahead of the 2022–23 season. He spent time on dual-registration with Darwen and Longridge Town.

In July 2023, Da Costa signed for League Two club Salford City on an initial one-year deal, joining the club's B team. On 10 October 2023, he made his debut for the club as a substitute in a 3–1 EFL Trophy defeat to Stockport County. Two months later, he made his league debut for the club from the bench as his side lost 3–0 at home to Grimsby Town.

In October 2024, Da Costa joined Northern Premier League Premier Division side Warrington Rylands on a one-month loan deal. In January 2025, he joined Bamber Bridge on a one-month loan. On 27 March, he joined Hyde United on loan for the remainder of the season.

On 12 May 2025, Salford announced he would be released in June when his contract expires.

== Career statistics ==
As of match played 1 January 2024

Appearances and goals by club, season and competition
Club	Season	League			FA Cup		League Cup		Other		Total	
Club	Season	Division	Apps	Goals	Apps	Goals	Apps	Goals	Apps	Goals	Apps	Goals
FC United of Manchester	2022–23	NPL Premier Division	6	0	0	0	—		0	0	6	0
Salford City	2023–24	League Two	2	0	0	0	0	0	2 (Note: Appearance(s) in EFL Trophy)	0	4	0
Career total			8	0	0	0	0	0	2	0	10	0
