= Connor McLennan =

Scottish footballer

Personal information
- Date of birth: 5 October 1999 (age 27)
- Place of birth: Peterhead, Scotland
- Height: 1.82 m (6 ft 0 in)
- Position: Winger

Team information
- Current team: Livingston
- Number: 11

Youth career
- Peterhead Boys Club
- 2008–2015: Aberdeen

Senior career*
Years	Team	Apps	(Gls)
2015–2023	Aberdeen	86	(6)
2016–2017	→ Brechin City (loan)	3	(1)
2017–2018	→ Brechin City (loan)	15	(2)
2022–2023	→ St Johnstone (loan)	26	(1)
2023–2024	Salford City	24	(1)
2024–2025	Ayr United	26	(3)
2025–	Livingston	16	(3)

International career^{‡}
2014	Scotland U16	2	(0)
2016	Scotland U17	6	(1)
2018	Scotland U20	1	(0)
2019–2020	Scotland U21	9	(4)
- * Club domestic league appearances and goals as of 22:05, 4 February 2026 (UTC) ‡ National team caps and goals as of 21:28, 13 October 2020 (UTC)

Connor McLennan (born 5 October 1999) is a Scottish professional footballer who plays as a winger for Scottish Championship side Livingston.

He has previously played for Aberdeen, Brechin City, St Johnstone, Salford City and Ayr United.

== Club career ==
McLennan was born and raised in Peterhead, Aberdeenshire, and attended Peterhead Academy. He joined Aberdeen's youth system at the age of eight, and turned professional aged 16 in December 2015. He made his debut as a substitute away to St Johnstone on 22 April 2016.

On 16 December 2016, McLennan joined Scottish League One side Brechin City on a one-month emergency loan deal, playing three times and scoring once. He returned to Brechin for a second loan spell on 30 August 2017.

Having scored in the final of the 2017–18 Scottish Youth Cup and made further appearances in the first team, including as a substitute in the 2018 Scottish League Cup Final, In December 2018, he signed a new contract with Aberdeen until 2021. In January 2021, he signed a new contract until 2023.

He moved on loan to St Johnstone on 1 September 2022. He left Aberdeen in 2023 after fifteen years at the club.

In July 2023, he signed for English club Salford City. He was released by the club at the end of the season.

On 11 October 2024, he signed for Scottish Championship side Ayr United.

On 9 June 2025, McLennan joined newly-promoted Scottish Premiership side Livingston.

== International career ==
McLennan represented Scotland at under-16, under-17 and under-20 levels, including at the 2016 UEFA European Under-17 Championship in Azerbaijan. He then played for the under-21 team, and scored both goals in a 2–1 win against Croatia in September 2019.

== Career statistics ==
As of 4 February 2026

Appearances and goals by club, season and competition
Club	Season	League			National Cup		League Cup		Other		Total	
Club	Season	Division	Apps	Goals	Apps	Goals	Apps	Goals	Apps	Goals	Apps	Goals
Aberdeen	2015–16	Scottish Premiership	1	0	0	0	0	0	0	0	1	0
Aberdeen	2016–17	Scottish Premiership	0	0	0	0	0	0	2 (Note: Appearance(s) for Aberdeen under-20s/21s in the Scottish Challenge Cup, in which age-restricted teams from the SPFL Premiership clubs compete against senior clubs)	0	2	0
Aberdeen	2017–18	Scottish Premiership	0	0	0	0	0	0	2	0	2	0
Aberdeen	2018–19	Scottish Premiership	21	3	4	1	2	0	1	0	28	4
Aberdeen	2019–20	Scottish Premiership	18	3	4	0	2	0	1 (Note: Appearances in UEFA Europa League)	0	25	3
Aberdeen	2020–21	Scottish Premiership	27	0	2	0	0	0	1	0	30	0
Aberdeen	2021–22	Scottish Premiership	19	0	0	0	1	0	5 (Note: Appearances in UEFA Conference League)	1	25	1
Aberdeen	2022–23	Scottish Premiership	0	0	0	0	0	0	0	0	0	0
Aberdeen	2023–24	Scottish Premiership	0	0	0	0	0	0	0	0	0	0
Aberdeen	Total		86	6	10	1	5	0	12	1	113	8
Brechin City (loan)	2016–17	Scottish League One	3	1	0	0	0	0	0	0	3	1
Brechin City (loan)	2017–18	Scottish Championship	15	2	0	0	0	0	0	0	15	2
St Johnstone (loan)	2022–23	Scottish Premiership	26	1	1	0	0	0	0	0	27	1
Salford City	2023–24	EFL League Two	24	1	2	0	2	2	2 (Note: Appearances in the EFL Trophy)	0	30	3
Ayr United	2024–25	Scottish Championship	26	3	2	0	0	0	4 (Note: 2 appearances in Scottish Challenge Cup, 2 appearances in Scottish Premiership play-offs)	0	32	3
Livingston	2025–26	Scottish Premiership	16	3	1	0	2	0	0	0	19	3
Career total			196	17	16	1	9	2	18	1	239	21
