= Moor Lane =

English football stadium in Greater Manchester

- AIG Stadium
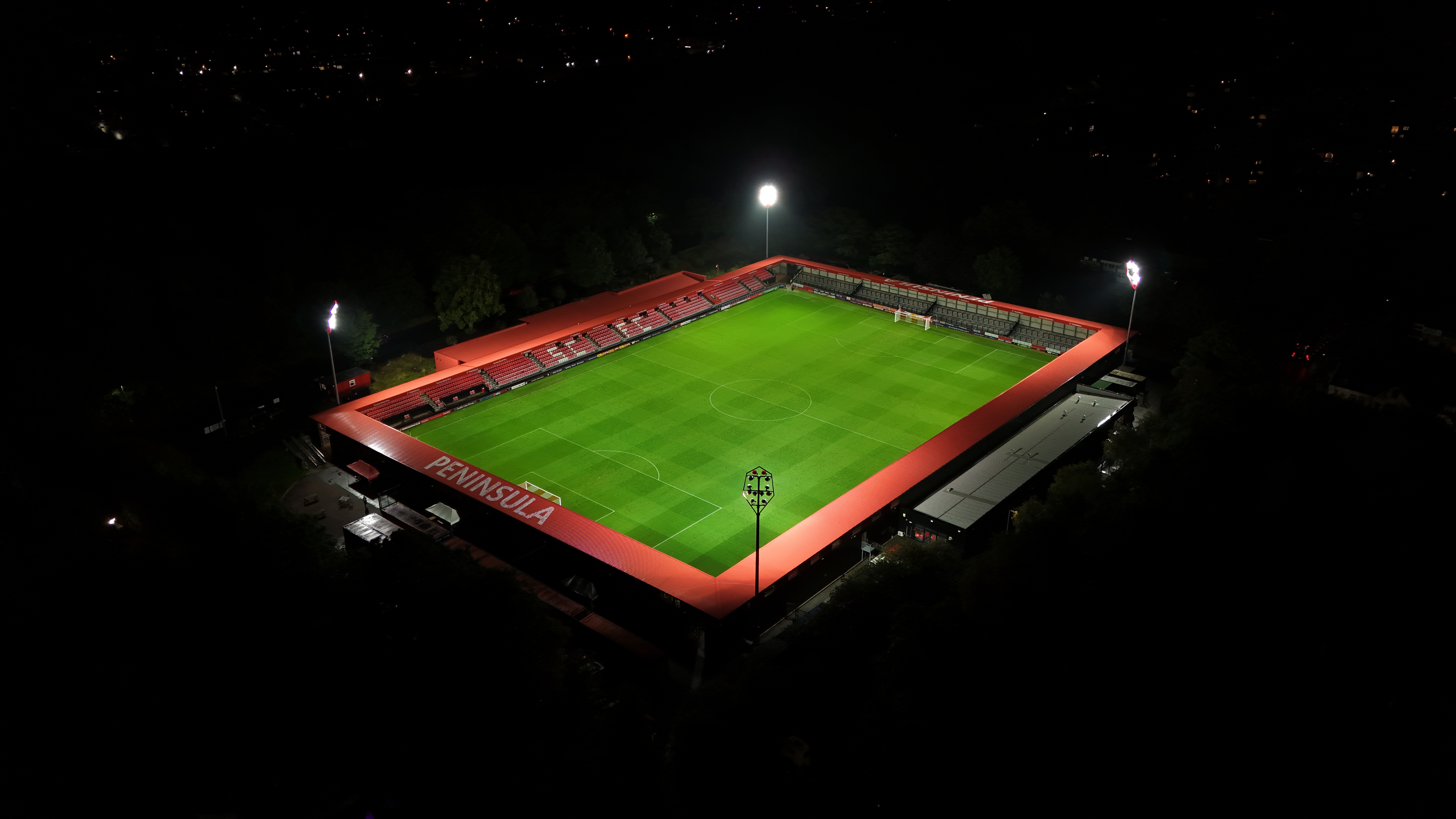
- Aerial view of the stadium in 2024
- Interactive map of Moor Lane
- Address: Moor Lane; Kersal; Salford M7 3PZ; Greater Manchester; England
- Coordinates: 53°30′49″N 2°16′36″W
- Owner: Salford City F.C.
- Operator: Salford City F.C.
- Capacity: 5,108
- Surface: Grass
- Record attendance: 4,591 (Salford City 3–1 Wrexham A.F.C., EFL League Two, 3 February 2024)
- Field size: 105 by 68 metres (114.8 yd × 74.4 yd)
- Public transit: Moor Lane Bus Stop

Construction
- Opened: 1978
- Expanded: 2016–2017
- Main contractor: Stadium Solutions

Tenants
- Salford City (1978–present); Swinton Lions (2002–2004)

Moor Lane, currently known as the AIG Stadium for sponsorship reasons, is a football stadium in the area of Kersal, Salford, Greater Manchester, England, and is the current home ground of Salford City Football Club since its opening in 1978. It has a current capacity of 5,108, following its last expansion in 2017.

== History ==
Salford City moved to Moor Lane in 1978, but it had been a venue for other sports for many years before; Manchester Rugby Club played there from 1908 until 1969.

In 2016, renovation work began, which saw its capacity rise from 1,600 to 5,108, including 2,246 seats.

In 2017, the renovated stadium was reopened by Alex Ferguson, with Peninsula Business Services as sponsors. In 2019, the stadium hosted a semi-professional international fixture between England C and Wales C. The record attendance at the ground is 4,591 on 03 February 2024, a 3–1 win against Wrexham A.F.C. in a League Two fixture.

In 2026, the stadium was renamed after a sponsorship agreement with AIG.

== Transport ==
The stadium is served by bus route 93 between Bury and Manchester, route 94 between Pilsworth and North Manchester General Hospital, route 95 between Bury and Salford Shopping Centre and nearby route 66 serving Eccles, Swinton, Pendlebury and Prestwich. It is served by route 92 during the evening.
