= List of people from Manchester =

This is a list of people from Manchester, a city in North West England. The demonym of Manchester is Mancunian or Manc. This list is arranged alphabetically by surname. For people from Greater Manchester see List of people from Greater Manchester.

== A–C ==
- Daniel Adamson (1820–1890) – engineer born in Durham who designed the Manchester Ship Canal; one of the directors of the Manchester chamber of commerce; Justice of the Peace for Cheshire and Manchester; buried in Withington
- Chris Addison (born 1971) – stand-up comedian, writer and actor
- Mark Addy (1840–1890) – Manchester-born Albert Medal recipient
- Caroline Aherne (1963–2016) – BAFTA Award-winning actress, comedian and writer, The Mrs Merton Show
- William Harrison Ainsworth (1805–1882) – historical novelist born in Manchester
- Sir John Alcock (1892–1919) – aviator who, with Arthur Whitten Brown, made the first nonstop transatlantic flight
- David Alliance, Baron Alliance (1932-2025), businessman and politician
- Adam Anderson (born 1984) – synthesist, one half of synth-pop duo Hurts.
- Don Arden (1926–2007) – Cheetham Hill-born music manager and businessman, who oversaw the careers of rock groups the Small Faces, Electric Light Orchestra and Black Sabbath.
- Anthony Arthur (born 1973) – Olympic weightlifter (1996 Summer Olympics)
- George Arthurs (1875–1944), songwriter and author
- George Aspull (1813–1832) – an English musician.
- Rob Atha (born 1986) – table football player
- Michael Atherton (born 1968) – former England cricket captain and commentator
- Ambrose Barlow (1585–1641) – a canonized Benedictine monk.
- Thomas Barritt (1743–1820) – an early British antiquary.
- Joshua Bayes (1671–1746) – a nonconformist minister.
- Norman Beaker (born 1950) – from Longsight, blues guitarist, vocalist, songwriter, band leader and record producer, inducted as a Legend in the Blues Hall of Fame in 2017.
- Kathryn Beaumont (born 1937) – actress, known for playing the title role in Walt Disney's Alice in Wonderland (1951), born in Victoria Park.
- William Worby Beaumont (1848–1929) – automotive engineer and inventor
- Max Beesley (born 1971) – English actor and musician
- Thomas Bellot (1806-1857) – an English naval surgeon and philologist.
- Michael Bisping (born 1979) – UFC Middleweight Champion
- Niamh Blackshaw (born 1998) – actress, portrayed Juliet Nightingale in Hollyoaks
- John Blackwall (1790–1881) – naturalist with a particular interest in spiders.
- John Booker (1603–1667) – an English astrologer with a career for over 30 years.
- Stan Bowles (1948–2024) – born and brought up in Collyhurst; Manchester City, QPR, Nottingham Forest and England International footballer in the 1970s
- Maud Boyd (1867–1929) – actress and operatic singer
- John Bradford (1510–1555) – English Reformer, prebendary of Old St Paul's Cathedral, and martyr.
- William Bradley (1801–1857) – an English portrait artist.
- Benjamin Brierley (1825–1896) – weaver, who took up writing in Lancashire dialect.
- John Briggs (1788–1861) – prelate of the Roman Catholic Church and Bishop of Beverley from 1850 to 1860.
- Edward Brotherton (1814–1866) – English Swedenborgian and educational reform campaigner.
- Joe Brown (1930–2020) – born in Ardwick, climber and mountaineer
- Wes Brown (born 1979) – former Manchester United footballer
- Jabez Bunting (1779–1858) – Wesleyan Methodist leader.
- Anthony Burgess (1917–1993) – Manchester-born and educated author, poet, playwright, musician, linguist, translator and critic, known for novel A Clockwork Orange
- Frances Hodgson Burnett (1849–1924) – , a British-American novelist and playwright, she wrote Little Lord Fauntleroy (1886).
- Henry James Byron (1835–1884) – dramatist, editor, journalist, director, theatre manager, novelist and actor.
- Darren Campbell (born 1973) – former sprinter representing Great Britain
- John Cassell (1817–1865) – was an English publisher, printer, writer and editor, founded Cassell & Co.
- Thomas George Cassell (born 1993) – YouTuber and Twitch streamer
- John Cassidy (1860–1939) – Irish-born sculptor and painter who lived in Manchester
- Tom Chantrell (1916–2001) – designer of many film posters including The Sound of Music and Star Wars
- Sir Humphrey Chetham (1580–1653) – merchant and benefactor of Chetham's Library; born in Crumpsall
- Saira Choudhry (born 1982), actress, born in Cheetham Hill
- Stanley Chow (born 1974) – artist and illustrator
- Samuel Clegg (1781–1861) – engineer, he developed the gas works process.
- John Clowes (1743–1831) – cleric, Rector of St John's Church, Manchester, disciple of Emanuel Swedenborg.
- Richard Cobden (1804–1865) – Sussex-born industrialist who moved to Manchester, where he was politically active
- Ellen Melicent Cobden (1848–1914) – writer, radical campaigner and suffragist; daughter of Richard Cobden
- Kenneth Colley (1937–2025) – actor who played Admiral Piett in The Empire Strikes Back and Return of the Jedi
- Roy Collins (1934–2009) – cricketer who played for Lancashire and Cheshire; born in Clayton
- Verona Conway (1910–1986) – plant ecologist
- George Cooke (1807–1863) – an English actor.
- George Cooke (1826–1862) – cricketer
- Mary Corkling (1850–1938) – artist and food reformer, was born at Withington
- Lisa Cross (born 1978) – IFBB professional bodybuilder
- Kevin Cummins (born 1953) – award-winning professional photographer, responsible for iconic Joy Division photographs and for charting the rise of punk rock and Britpop, born in Withington
- Peter Cundall (1927–2021) – horticulturist and television presenter; born in Manchester
- Ian Curtis (1956–1980) – musician and singer in Joy Division

== D–G ==
- Mark Davies (born 1959) – Roman Catholic Bishop of Shrewsbury
- Aaron Davis (born 1990) – his stage name Bugzy Malone, rapper and actor, grime genre artist
- Maximilian Davis (born 1994 or 1995) – fashion designer; creative director of Ferragamo
- Les Dawson (1931–1993) – comedian, born in Collyhurst
- Arthur Delaney (1927–1987) – painter, influenced by L. S. Lowry
- Lee Dixon (born 1964) – former professional footballer and ITV Sport football pundit
- DJ Semtex – disc jockey and presenter for BBC Radio 1Xtra digital radio station, presents the hip-hop show Friday Nights
- Robert Donat (1905–1958) – film and stage actor; known for his roles in Alfred Hitchcock's The 39 Steps and Goodbye, Mr. Chips, for which he won an Academy Award for Best Actor
- Edith Escombe (1866–1950) – fiction writer and essayist
- Rachel Fairburn (born 1983) – popular comedian and one half of the true crime serial killer comedy podcast All Killa No Filla
- Thomas Falkner (1707–1784) – a Jesuit missionary, explorer and physician, active in Patagonia.
- Benjamin Rawlinson Faulkner (1787–1849) – an English portrait-painter.
- Judy Finnigan (born 1948) – TV presenter and columnist; usually co-presents with her husband, Richard Madeley; as a pair they are Richard and Judy
- Wayne Fontana (1945–2020) – real name Glyn Geoffrey Ellis, singer with the Mindbenders
- Norman Foster (born 1935) – architect; founder and chairman of Foster and Partners studios; raised in Levenshulme
- Dean Furman (born 1988) – professional footballer
- Liam Gallagher (born 1972) – lead singer of Manchester band Oasis
- Noel Gallagher (born 1967) – songwriter and lead guitarist for High Flying Birds and formerly Oasis
- George Garrett (1852–1902) – submarine pioneer who built Resurgam; brought up in Moss Side
- Max George (born 1988) – singer, songwriter, actor and member of boy band the Wanted
- Andy Gibb (1958–1988) – singer and actor; born in Stretford
- Barry Gibb (born 1946) – singer and musician, member of the Bee Gees; brought up in Chorlton-cum-Hardy
- Maurice Gibb (1949–2003) – singer and musician, member of the Bee Gees; brought up in Chorlton-cum-Hardy
- Robin Gibb (1949–2012) – singer and songwriter, member of the Bee Gees; brought up in Chorlton-cum-Hardy
- Jimmy Golder (1955–2000) – professional footballer, played 145 games for Hyde United F.C.
- Jimi Goodwin (born 1970) – bassist, vocalist and guitarist for the Doves
- Holliday Grainger (born 1988) – actress, known for her roles in The Borgias, Strike or The Capture TV series
- William Green (1760–1823) – artist, poet, writer and landscape painter.
- William Rathbone Greg (1809–1881) – an English essayist.
- Trevor Griffiths (1935–2024) – dramatist, co-writer of screenplay for the film Reds; born in Ancoats
- Nick Grimshaw (born 1984) – Manchester-born Radio 1 DJ
- Sydney Grundy (1848–1914) – English dramatist, he adaptated European plays.

== H–M ==
- Andrew Hall (born 1973) – Cheshire cricketer
- Arthur Harden (1865–1940) – Manchester-born Nobel Prize–winning biochemist
- Charles Christian Hennell (1809–1850) – an English merchant, and a Unitarian apologist.
- Mary Hennell (1802–1843) – a reforming writer from a notable family of writers.
- William Henry (1774–1836) – an English chemist, developed Henry's law.
- Benjamin Heywood (1793–1865) – prominent Manchester citizen, philanthropist and politician
- Oliver Heywood (1630–1702) – banker and philanthropist
- Thomas Heywood (1797–1866) – antiquarian, involved in the Chetham Society.
- George Hibbert (1757–1837) – merchant, politician, ship-owner, botanist and book-collector; co-founded of the West India Dock Company and the Royal National Lifeboat Institution in 1824.
- Bernard Hill (1944–2024) – film, stage and television actor, known for playing Yosser Hughes in Boys from the Blackstuff and roles in blockbuster films, including Titanic, The Lord of the Rings film trilogy and True Crime
- Matt Hill (born 1984) – science fiction and horror writer
- Richard Hollinworth (1607–1656) – an English clergyman of presbyterian views.
- Ray Honeyford (1934–2012) – headmaster and writer, known for highlighting the failures of multiculturalism in Bradford
- John Hopkinson (1849–1898) – physicist, electrical engineer, he invented the three-wire (three-phase) wiring system.
- Keith Hopwood (born 1946) – guitarist with Herman's Hermits, born in Davyhulme
- Shotty Horroh (born 1986) – real name Adam Rooney, well known rapper, singer and actor
- Myra Hindley (born 1942) – Gorton-born serial killer who, along with her accomplice, Ian Brady, claimed the lives of five victims in Manchester in the 1960s
- Peter Hook (born 1956) – bassist of the bands Joy Division and New Order
- Mick Hucknall (born 1960) – lead singer of the band Simply Red
- Charles Hulbert (1778–1857) – businessman and writer.
- Nat Jacobs (1939–2021) – amateur and professional boxer
- Howard Jacobson (born 1942) – Man Booker Prize-winning British Jewish author and journalist, best known for writing comic novels that often revolve around the dilemmas of British Jewish characters
- Edward James MP QC (1807–1867) – barrister and Liberal Party politician.
- Davy Jones (1945–2012) – actor; singer of the band the Monkees
- Michelle Keegan (born 1987) – an actress on Coronation Street
- Brian Kidd (born 1949) – football coach; assistant manager at Manchester City since December 2009; former player; assistant manager to Alex Ferguson at Manchester United in the 1990s; born in Collyhurst
- Foo Foo Lammar (1937–2003) – drag queen, real name Francis Joseph Pearson born in Ancoats
- Ann Lee (1736–1784) – , commonly known as Mother Ann Lee, was the founding leader of the Shakers.
- Harold Lever (1914–1995) – Labour politician and Baron Lever
- Emmanuel Levy (1900–1986) – painter, teacher and art critic
- Martin Lewis (born 1972) – Withington-born financial journalist who founded MoneySavingExpert.com
- Harvey Lisberg (born 1940) – music and sporting manager who discovered Herman's Hermits
- David Lloyd George (1863–1945) – born in Chorlton-in-Medlock; British Prime Minister during the First World War; member of the Liberal Party.
- Sunny Lowry (1911–2008) – Longsight-born swimmer who was the first British woman to swim the English Channel
- Francis Maceroni (1788–1846) – soldier, diplomat, revolutionary, balloonist, author and inventor.
- Bernard Manning (1930–2007) – Ancoats-born stand-up comedian
- Ernest Marples (1907–1978) – politician, Postmaster-General and Minister of Transport; born in Levenshulme
- Johnny Marr (born 1963) – songwriter, guitarist, keyboardist, harmonica player and singer; the guitarist in the Smiths
- Ian McShane (born 1942) – actor who grew up in Manchester
- Peter Mellor (born 1947) – American football goalkeeper and coach played 512 games before moving to USA
- Mohyeldeen Mohammad (born 1986) – Islamist activist who studied in Saudi Arabia prior to his deportation
- Thomas Molineux (1759–1850) – stenographer and schoolteacher.
- Steven Patrick Morrissey (born 1959) – singer-songwriter and frontman in the Smiths, writer and poet. Born in Old Trafford,
- Daniel Moult (born 1973) – concert organist, organ tutor and animateur, ensemble player and presenter of films about music
- Gary Mounfield (1962–2025) – known as Mani, bassist, formerly of the Stone Roses and later in Primal Scream

== N–R ==
- Doug Naylor (born 1955) – comedy writer, created the comedy series Red Dwarf
- Matt O'Connor (born 1967) – marketing consultant, political activist and gender equality activist; founded of Fathers 4 Justice
- Samuel Ogden (1716–1778) – a priest of Church of England, an academic and popular preacher.
- Alfred Ollivant (1798–1882) – an academic who became Bishop of Llandaff.
- Jason Orange (born 1970) – singer, songwriter, dancer, former member of Take That
- Daniel Orme (1766–1837) – artist, publisher and official Historical Engraver to George III.
- Nigel Osborne (born 1948) – composer, teacher and aid worker
- John Owens (1790–1846) – merchant and philanthropist, he helped found part of the University of Manchester.
- Nathan Paget (1615–1679) – an English physician, active during the English Civil War.
- Emmeline Pankhurst (1858–1928) – political activist and suffragette, born in Moss Side
- Joseph Parry (1756–1826) – a British painter and engraver.
- David William Paynter (1791–1823) – an English author of poetry and drama.
- Henry Pendleton (?? – 1557) – an English churchman, a theologian and controversialist.
- Duncan Perry (born 1962) – cricketer
- Anshel Pfeffer (born 1973) – journalist
- Karl Pilkington (born 1972) – podcaster, author and TV presenter; known for his work with Ricky Gervais
- Fee Plumley (born ??) – digital artist, technology evangelist and digital consultant.
- John Polanyi (born 1929) – chemist, brought up in Manchester; won the 1986 Nobel Prize in Chemistry for his research in chemical kinetics
- Simon N. Powell (born 1955) – born in Manchester; cancer researcher and radiation oncologist
- Victoria Princewill (born 1990) – born in Manchester; novelist and author of In the Palace of Flowers (2021) and The Diary of Sarah Forbes Bonetta (2023)
- Thomas de Quincey (1785–1859) – born in Manchester; author and intellectual; known for his Confessions of an English Opium-Eater (1821)
- Dorning Rasbotham (c.1730–1791) – an English writer, antiquarian and artist.
- Marcus Rashford (born 1997) – footballer; plays for Barcelona and England
- Lee Rigby (1987–2013) – of the 2nd Battalion of the Royal Regiment of Fusiliers; originally from Middleton, Greater Manchester; Lee, whilst off-duty and walking back to barracks, was killed by two Islamic extremists on 27 May 2013 as a terror attack
- Marc Riley (born 1961) – musician; alternative rock critic and radio DJ on BBC 6 Music; former member of the Fall
- Samuel Robinson (1794–1884) – an industrialist and scholar of Persian who founded the Dukinfield Village Library.
- John Bolton Rogerson (1809–1859) – an English poet.
- Andy Rourke (1964–2023) – bass guitarist best known for being a former member of the Smiths
- Lee Rourke (born 1972) – novelist best known for The Canal, Vulgar Things and Glitch
- James Rowley (1830–1870) – an English first-class cricketer.
- Shaun Ryder (born 1962) – vocalist and songwriter with the Happy Mondays who became famous in the Madchester era

== S–Z ==
- Peter Saville (born 1955) – Manchester-born artist and designer, best known for his work with Factory Records
- James Saxon (1772–1819) – an English portrait painter.
- Ceallach Spellman (born 1995) – actor and presenter
- John Squire (born 1962) – guitarist with the Stone Roses
- Paul Stenning (born 1976) – author, brought up in Davyhulme
- James Stephenson (1808–1886) – an English engraver.
- Nobby Stiles (1942–2020) – born in Collyhurst, former football midfielder. One of only three Englishmen to have won both World and European Cups
- Frank Stone (1800–1859) – an English painter.
- Bernard Sumner (born 1956) – singer-songwriter, guitarist, keyboard player and producer, founding member of two bands, Joy Division and New Order
- Julia Sutcliffe (born 1960's) – engineer
- John Thaw (1942–2002) – actor; known for his roles in The Sweeney, Inspector Morse and Kavanagh QC; born in Longsight, brought up in Burnage
- Katie Thistleton – CBBC presenter and Radio 1 DJ
- John Thomas (1886–1954) – recipient of the Victoria Cross
- Edmund Thomson (1874–1914) – cricketer and British Army officer
- Elihu Thomson (1853-1937) – engineer and inventor who helped found several major electrical companies in the United Kingdom, France, and the United States
- John Thompson (1785–1866) – a British wood-engraver.
- J. J. Thomson (1856–1940) – physicist and Nobel laureate; credited with the discovery of the electron and of isotopes, and the invention of the mass spectrometer; awarded the 1906 Nobel Prize in Physics for the discovery of the electron and his work on the conduction of electricity in gases
- Robert Thyer (1709–1781) – writer and literary editor, best known as Chetham's Librarian.
- Charles Henry Timperley (1794–1869) – an English printer and writer.
- Mabel Tylecote (1896–1987) – adult educationist
- Shayne Ward (born 1984) – singer who won the second series of The X Factor
- Mary Warner 1804–1854) – actress and theatre manager.
- Sir Edward Watkin, 1st Baronet (1819– 1901) – MP and railway entrepreneur.
- Simon Webbe (born 1978) – singer/songwriter. Member of boyband Blue
- Danny Webber (born 1981) – footballer, formerly of Manchester United and Sheffield United
- Danny Welbeck (born 1990) – footballer who plays for Brighton & Hove Albion F.C.
- Charles White (1728–1813) – physician, co-founded the Manchester Royal Infirmary.
- James William Whittaker (1828-1876) – a British watercolour painter.
- John Whitaker (1735–1808) – an English historian and Anglican clergyman.
- John William Whittaker (1791–1854) – an English Anglican clergyman.
- Sir Joseph Whitworth (1803–1887) – engineer, entrepreneur, inventor and philanthropist
- Andy Williams (born 1970) – drummer and vocalist of the Doves
- Jez Williams (born 1970) – guitarist/songwriter of the Doves
- Tony Wilson (1950–2007) – co-founder of Factory Records and Granada Reports reporter
- Michael Wood (born 1948) – historian and broadcaster; has presented numerous TV documentary series, and made over 80 documentary films
- Walter B. Woodbury (1834–1885) – an inventor and pioneering English photographer.
- Alan Wren (born 1964) – known as Reni; drummer of the Stone Roses
- Thomas Wright (1789–1875) – a prison philanthropist.
- Katie Zelem (born 1996) – footballer for England women

== See also ==
- List of music artists and bands from Manchester
