= Bellot (surname) =

Bellot is a surname. Notable people with the surname include:

- Alfred H. Bellot, American historian
- Hugh Hale Bellot (1890–1969), English historian
- Jacob Bellot (born 2000), Petty Officer in the United States Navy
- Jean-Michel Bellot (born 1953), French pole vaulter
- Joseph René Bellot (1826–1853), French arctic explorer
- Paul Bellot (1876–1944), French monk and architect
- Pierre François Bellot (1776–1836), Swiss jurist and politician
- Raymond Bellot (1929–2019), French footballer
- Silvia Bellot, Spanish motor racing official
- Thomas Bellot (1806–1857), English naval surgeon and philologist
