= Marcus Gheeraerts =

Marcus Gheeraerts may refer to:

- Marcus Gheeraerts the Elder (c. 1520 – c. 1590), Flemish engraver and illustrator
- Marcus Gheeraerts the Younger (1562–1635), English portrait painter and son of the above
