= Bellot =

Bellot may refer to:

- Bellot (surname)
- Bellot, Seine-et-Marne, a commune in France
- Bellot Strait, between Somerset Island and the Boothia Peninsula in Nunavut, Canada
- Bellot (crater), a lunar crater
- Bellot dit Lafontaine, Governor of Plaisance, Newfoundland from 1664 to 1667
