= Thyer =

Thyer is a surname. Notable people with the surname include:

- Brad Thyer (born 1993), Welsh rugby union player
- Chris Thyer (born 1969), American lawyer and politician
- Laura Thyer (born 1993), English Dressage rider
- Mario Thyer (born 1966), Canadian ice hockey player
- Robert Thyer (1709–1781), British writer and literary editor
