= Thomas Jones (librarian) =

Welsh librarian (1810–75)

- Born: 1810
- Died: 29 September 1875 (aged 64–65)
- Known for: Chetham's Librarian 1845-1875

Thomas Jones (1810 – 29 November 1875) was a Welsh librarian, academic, and antiquarian who was librarian of Chetham's Library in Manchester from 1845 to 1875.

== Life ==
Jones, from Margam in south Wales, was born in 1810 and educated at Cowbridge grammar school before attending Jesus College, Oxford, between 1827 and 1832. After obtaining his Bachelor of Arts degree, he turned to working with books (in preference to an earlier intention of becoming a priest). He catalogued the Neath library in 1842 and was appointed as the librarian of Chetham's Library in Manchester in 1845. Whilst he was in post, the library more than doubled in size (from 19,000 to 40,000 volumes) with Jones obtaining some books through his personal influence. His catalogue of 1862–63 (2 volumes) continued the earlier catalogues of Radcliffe and of Greswell (from 1791 and 1821 respectively). He was described as "one who seemed designed by nature for the place and whose whole soul was in his work". Jones kept a diary for the year 1866 recording his daily duties, most days would begin with dusting and cataloguing the books, whilst in the afternoons he would tend to library readers.

Jones was the Librarian when Karl Marx and Friedrich Engels visited the Library to consult materials, writing to Marx in 1870 after a recent visit to Chetham’s Library, Engels commented that "during the last few days I have again spent a good deal of time sitting at the four-sided desk in the alcove where we sat together twenty-four years ago. I am very fond of the place. The stained-glass window ensures that the weather is always fine there. Old Jones, the Librarian, is still alive but he is old and no longer active".

As well as the catalogues of the library's collections, he wrote a Catalogue of the collection of tracts for and against popery (published in and about the reign of James II) in the Manchester library founded by Humphrey Chetham (1859). He formed a close working relationship with Chetham's Society President James Crossely, who would become honorary Librarian of Chethams after Jones's death. Upon hearing of Jones's death on 29 September 1875, Crossley remarked, "I seem to have lost half of myself…I am too much affected to say more."

During his life Jones was an active antiquarian and was elected as a Fellow of the Society of Antiquaries of London in 1866, and served on the council for the Chetham's Society, editing volumes 48 and 64. Upon his death he had yet to publish a forthcoming title for the Chetham's Society focusing on the life of John Dee, the unpublished manuscript was donated to Chetham's Library as part of the Francis Robert Raines bequest.
