= Gerard Leeu =

Dutch printer

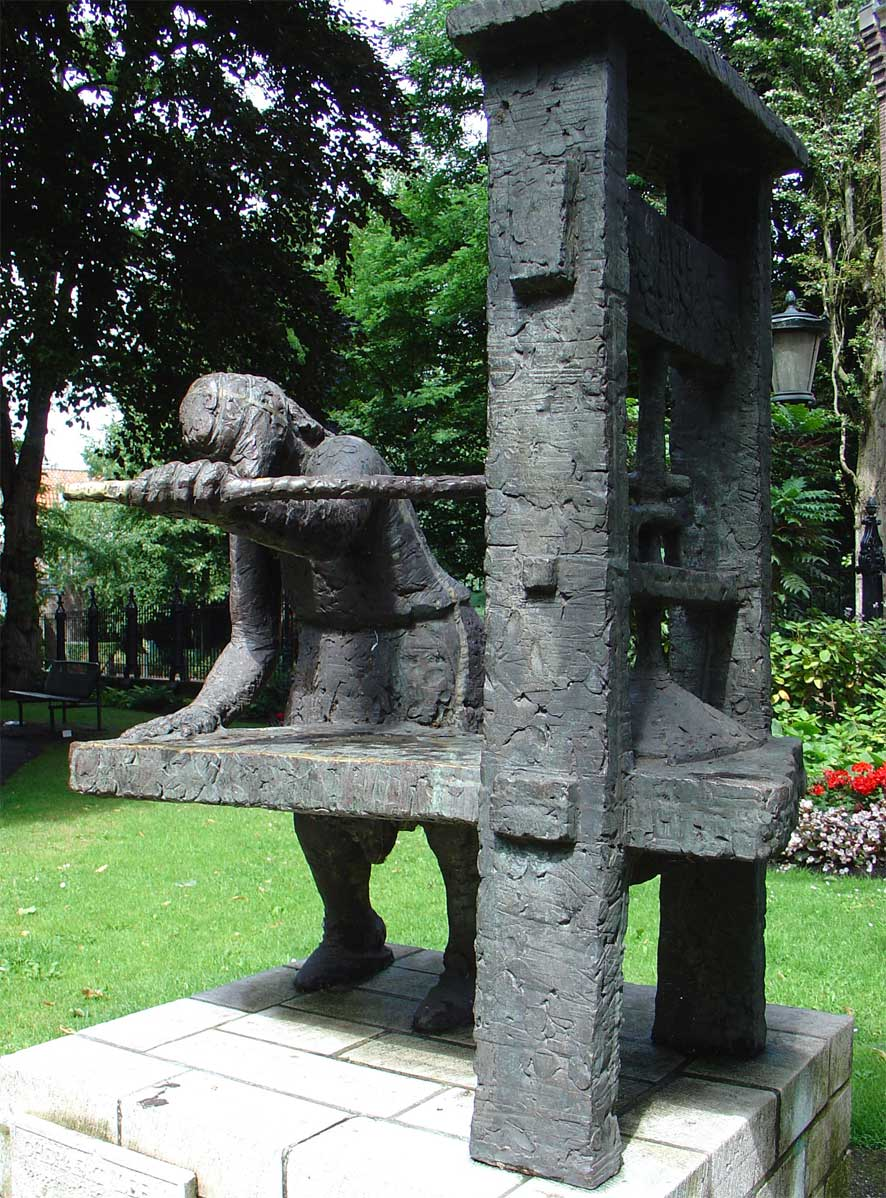
Gheraert Leeu drukker Gouda

Gerard or Gheraert Leeu, Leew, Lyon, or Leonis, (between 1445 and 1450, Gouda - 1492, Antwerp) was a Dutch printer of incunabula.

Leeu printed his first (liturgical) book in May 1477 in his shop in Gouda, where between 1477 and 1484 he produced a total of about 69 books. In 1484 he moved to Antwerp, where he died in 1492 from a stab wound during a quarrel with one of his typesetters.

Besides printing works in Latin and Dutch, he reprinted some of William Caxton's editions for the English market. These were The History of Jason, The History of Paris and Vienne and The Chronicles of England.

He published the Dialogus creaturarum in a number of editions, the first being in 1480. He also printed a Latin version of the Solomon and Marcolf legend, entitled Collationes quod dicuntur fecisse mutuo rex Solomon ... et Marcolphus in 1488, which he followed in 1492 with an English translation, This is the dyalogus or communyng betw[i]xt the wyse King Solomon and Marcolphus. It is not clear whether the English translation was done out of Dutch or Latin, but it is likely that Leeu had the translation made in his own shop from the earlier Latin edition.

== External Resources ==
- Cordiale quattuor novissimorum From the Rare Book and Special Collections Division at the Library of Congress
- Paulus Middelburgensis, Bp., d. 1534. Prognostica ad viginti annos duratura. Antwerp, Gerard Leeu, 28 Sept. (quarto Kalendas Octobris) 1484. From the Rare Book and Special Collections Division at the Library of Congress
