= Hans Folz =

German author

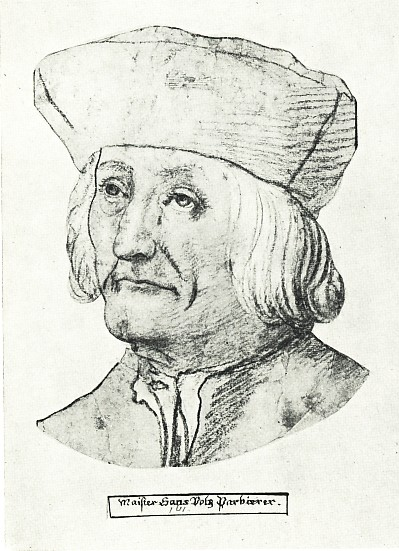
Hans Folz.

Hans Folz (c. 1437 – January 1513) was a German author of the late medieval early Renaissance period.

Folz was born in Worms. He was made a citizen of the city of Nuremberg, Germany in 1459 and master barber of the city in 1486. Folz was a reformer of the meistersangs, adding 27 new tones to those that had been allowed by the twelve "Alten Meister" (old masters) up to that point. His Meisterlieder (a type of song), of which he wrote about a thousand, were mostly devoted to religious questions. He also wrote twelve Fastnachtsspiele (short plays that made light of people in medieval society, for instance farmers, priests, and the bourgeoisie) in the same style as Hans Rosenplüt, but with more subtle language.

Folz has been labelled as an antisemite by Andrew Gow, who called him "a thorough-going Jew-hater" for his work Ein Spil von dem Herzogen von Burgund (A Story of the Dukes of Burgund). His brutal hostility towards Jews is particularly prominent in the carnival plays The Old and the New Marriage and The Dukes of Burgund, both of which culminate in the public humiliation and mistreatment of Jews, with vulgar references to the Jew's sow.

According to Albert Wimmer's Anthology of Medieval German Literature, "Folz's plays were trendsetters in the development of moderately dramatic plays (so-called «Handlungsspiele»)"..

His name was adapted by Richard Wagner for the coppersmith "Hans Foltz," one of the Mastersingers portrayed in the opera Die Meistersinger von Nürnberg.

== Works ==
- Bäderbüchlein (Bath Booklet, in 1480) Dises puchlein saget vns von allen paden, die von natur heiß sein..
- Hausratbüchlein (Furniture Booklet, in 1490)
- Das Spiel von dem König Salomon und dem Bauern Markolf (The Story of King Salomon and the Farmer Markolf)
- Von einem Kaiser und einem Abt (Of an Emperor and an Abbott – see also King John and the Bishop)
- Die Bauernheirat (The Farmer's Marriage)
- Ein Spiel von dem Herzogen von Burgund (A Story of the Dukes of Burgund)

Folz is also the author of a fechtbuch of c. 1480, preserved in Weimar as MS Q566.
