= Dialogus creaturarum =

1480 collection of Latin fables

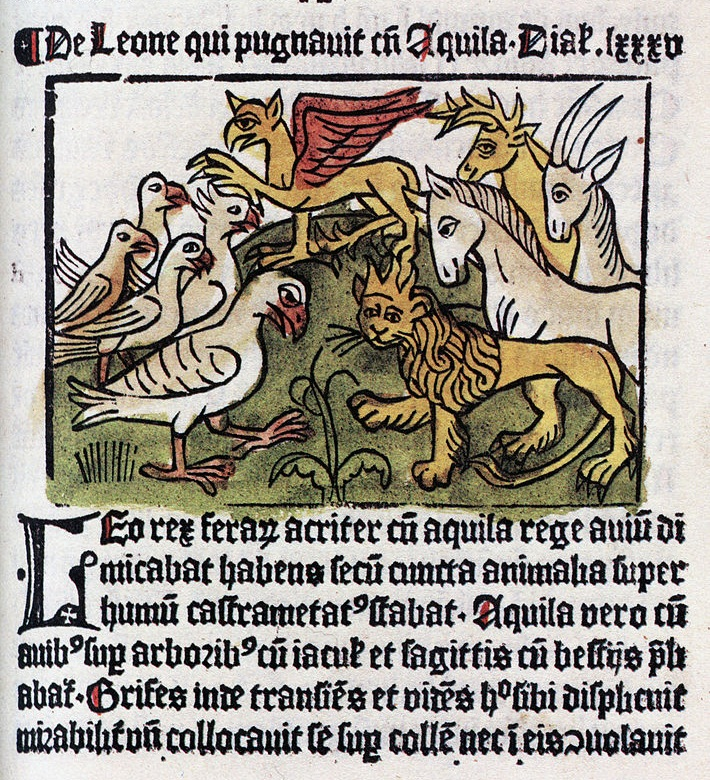
Johann Snell's edition

Dialogus creaturarum (more properly Dialogus creaturarum optime moralizatus or Dyalogus creaturarum moralizatus), is a collection of 122 Latin-language fables and, as the title implies, dialogues of creatures. It is usually dated to the middle of the fourteenth century.

The fables are organised in sections according to the different kinds of protagonists: first the astronomical, then the elements, followed by living things. The fables tell of the interactions of various anthropomorphized animals and end with a moral explanation. Common human problems are solved according to the teachings of the Bible, Church Fathers or classical Greek or Roman philosophy. The author is unknown, but surviving manuscripts suggest the collection may have been gathered and edited by either Mayno de Mayneri (Magninus Mediolanensis) or Nicolaus Pergamenus, both active in the 14th century. A number of the fables are from Aesop, such as The Lion's Share, The Frog and the Ox and The Wolf and the Lamb.

== Publication ==

The book was first published in 1480 by Gerard Leeu at Gouda, and several times reprinted by him. Each tale was illustrated by a woodcut. A second edition followed in 1481. He printed at least three more Latin editions, one more at Gouda in 1482 and two at Antwerp in 1486 and 1491. He also published two editions in Dutch in 1481 and 1482 and one in French in 1482. In the following year it became the first book printed in Sweden. A first English translation, The Dialoges of Creatures Moralysed, is presently assumed to have been printed in Antwerp in 1535.

The popularity of the work is clear from the number of editions published. Other printers soon published Latin texts: Conrad Winters de Homborch in 1481 at Cologne, Jean Bellot in 1500 at Geneva, Claude Nourry in 1509 at Lyon and Pigouchet in 1510 at Paris. In 1584 the book was printed by de Jode for Plantin as the Apologi Creaturarum, with plates by Marcus Gheeraerts the Elder.
