= Chetham's Library =

Library in Manchester, England

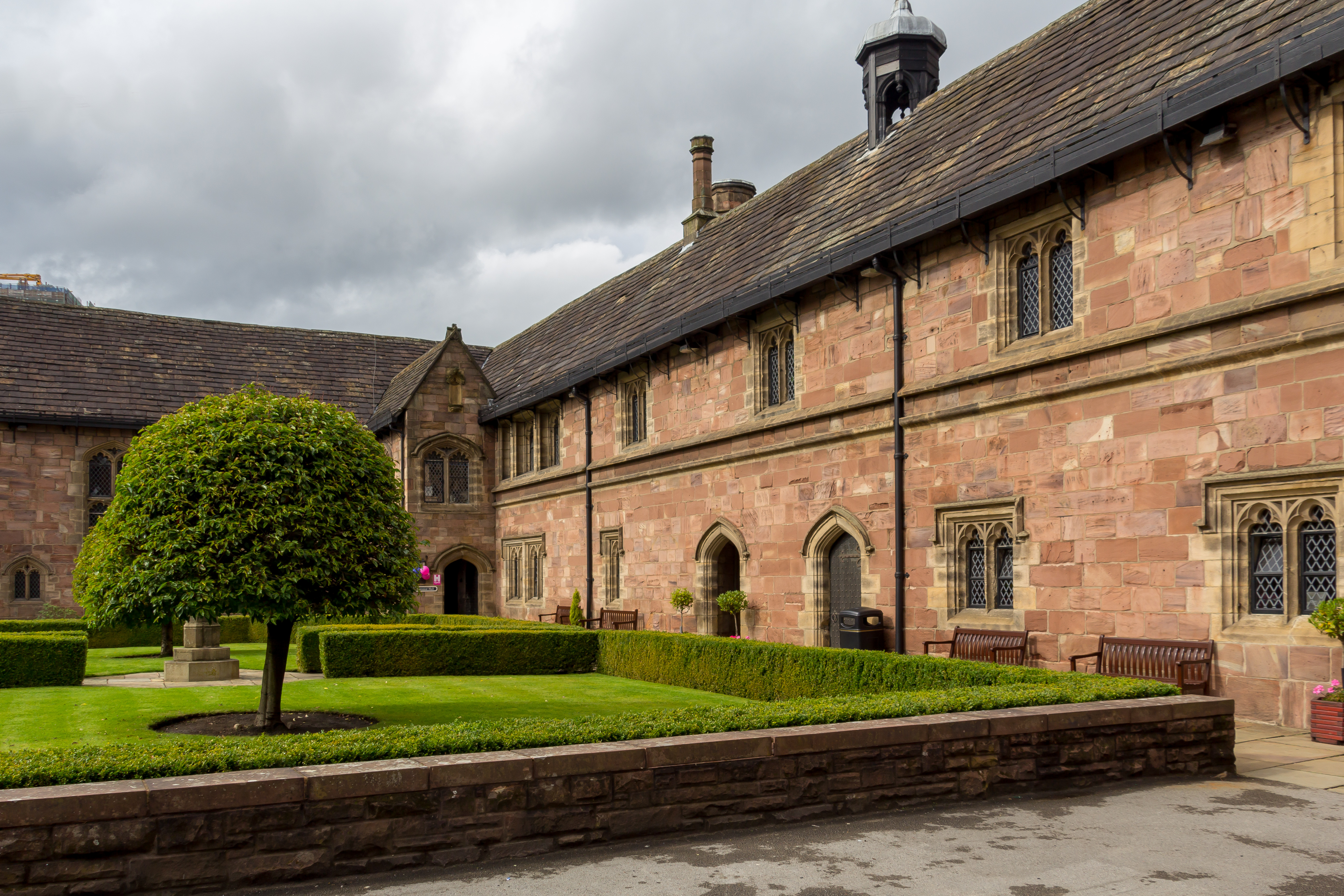
- "The oldest free public reference library in the English-speaking world."

- Location within Greater Manchester
- 53.4866°N 2.2439°W
- Type: Library
- Location: Manchester, England

Site notes
- Governing body: Privately owned

Listed Building – Grade I
- Official name: Chethams Hospital and Attached Wall
- Designated: 25 February 1952
- Reference no.: 1283015

Listed Building – Grade II
- Official name: Detached block of school room approximately 20m south of Chetham's Hospital
- Designated: 3 October 1974
- Reference no.: 1197920

Listed Building – Grade II
- Official name: South east wing to Chetham's Hospital (former Manchester Grammar School)
- Designated: 3 October 1974
- Reference no.: 1197921

Listed Building – Grade II
- Official name: Fragment of Hydes Cross approximately 20m south of Chetham's Hospital
- Designated: 3 October 1974
- Reference no.: 1219660

Chetham's Library in Manchester, England, is the oldest free public reference library in the English-speaking world. Chetham's Hospital, which contains both the library and Chetham's School of Music, was established in 1653 under the will of Humphrey Chetham (1580–1653), for the education of "the sons of honest, industrious and painful parents", and a library for the use of scholars. The library has been in continuous use since 1653. It operates as an independent charity.

The library holds more than 100,000 volumes of printed books, of which 60,000 were published before 1851 including a copy of the Nuremberg Chronicle annotated by Thomas Gudlawe. Collections include 16th- and 17th-century printed works, periodicals and journals, local history sources, broadsides and ephemera. In addition to print materials, the library holds a collection of over 1,000 manuscripts, including 41 medieval texts.

Chetham's Library is an Accredited Museum under the Arts Council England Accreditation scheme. The whole of its collections are Designated as a collection of national and international importance under the Museums, Libraries and Archives Council Designation scheme, now administered by Arts Council England.

Paintings featured as a part of the library's fine arts collection include portraits of William Whitaker, the Reverend John Radcliffe, Robert Thyer, the Reverend Francis Robert Raines, and Elizabeth Leigh. The collection includes An Allegory with Putti and Satyrs, oil on canvas, attributed to 16th-century artist and Netherlander Vincent Sellaer.

One of the most substantial collections pertains to Belle Vue Zoo and Gardens, Manchester's most renowned entertainment attraction and zoological centre, in operation from the 1830s to the 1980s. The collection contains thousands of posters, programmes and photographs, as well as the financial and business papers of the owner, John Jennison; large numbers of items in this collection are available in digitised form online. A 2014 grant of £45,000 obtained by Chetham's Library allowed curators to make the collection available to online users, via digitization projects.

== Access ==
The library is open to readers free of charge, Monday-Friday 09.00-12.30 and 13.30-16.30 by prior appointment. Tours of the library for visitors are bookable online via the library website.

== Catalogues and finding aids ==
Catalogues of printed items and of archives and manuscripts held at Chetham's Library are provided online.

== History ==
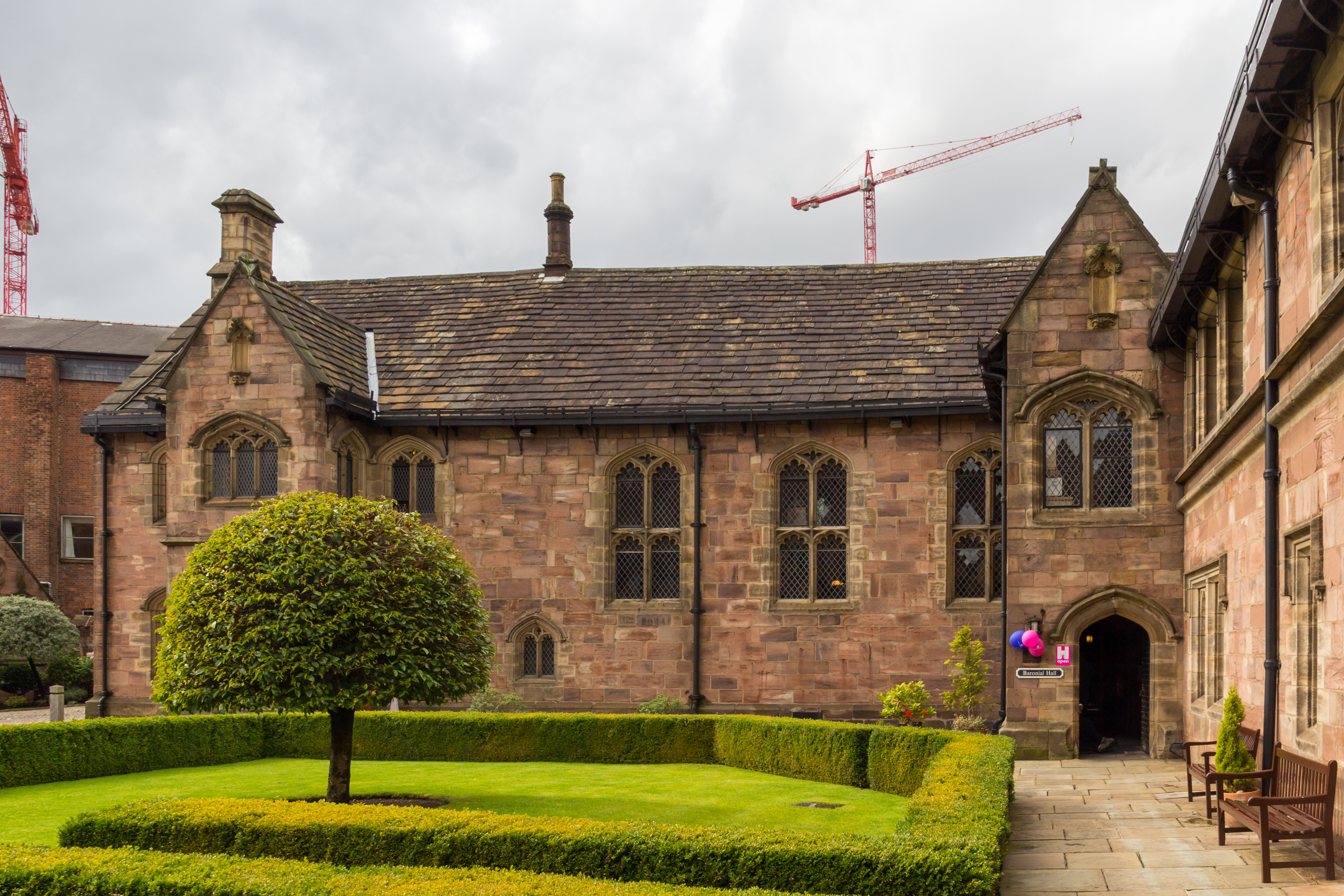
The 15th-century Baronial Hall next to Chetham's Library

The manor house of the lord of the manor, in the centre of the medieval town of Manchester, stood on a sandstone bluff, at the confluence of the River Irwell and the River Irk. In 1421 the rector of the parish church, Thomas de la Warre (Lord of the manor of Manchester), obtained a licence from Henry V to refound the church as a collegiate foundation. He donated his manor house for use as the college of priests' buildings for the collegiate church (later to be the cathedral). There was accommodation for the warden, eight fellows, four clerks, and six choristers.

The Manchester Free Grammar School for Lancashire Boys was built between the church and the college buildings between 1515 and 1518. The college was dissolved in 1547 by the Chantries Act 1547 (1 Edw. 6. c. 14) and sold to the Earl of Derby. It was re-founded as a catholic foundation by Queen Mary and again disbanded by Protestant Queen Elizabeth I. In 1578 the collegiate church was re-founded by charter as Christ's College and re-occupied by the warden and fellows. In the Civil War it was used as a prison and arsenal.

In 1653 the college buildings were bought with the bequest of Humphrey Chetham, for use as a free library and blue coat charity school. At that time there was no facility for independent study in the north of England and Chetham's will of 1651 had stipulated that the Library should be "for the use of schollars and others well affected", and instructed the librarian "to require nothing of any man that cometh into the library". The 24 feoffees appointed by Humphrey Chetham set out to acquire a major collection of books and manuscripts that would cover the whole range of available knowledge and would rival the college libraries of Oxford and Cambridge. In order to protect the newly acquired books from rising damp the Library was housed on the first floor and, in accordance with the provisions of Chetham's will, the books were chained to the presses (bookcases). Twenty-four carved oak stools with S-shaped hand-holds (which are still in use) were provided as seats for readers.

In 1718 the feoffees offered the Manchester poet and inventor of a system of shorthand, John Byrom, the post of Library Keeper. Byrom, who was an avid collector of books, declined the offer but after his good friend, Robert Thyer, became Librarian in 1732, frequently acted as an agent for the library, purchasing books at London auctions. Byrom's library, which included the manuscript of his poem "Christmas Day" (which became the Christmas carol, "Christians Awake") and some 2,800 printed books, was presented to the library by his descendant, Eleanora Atherton, in 1870.

The books were originally uncatalogued and placed in the presses in size order. The first catalogue wasn't produced until 1791, and then was written in Latin and only listed the size and subject of each book. The practice of chaining the books was abandoned in the mid eighteenth century when gates were erected to prevent theft.

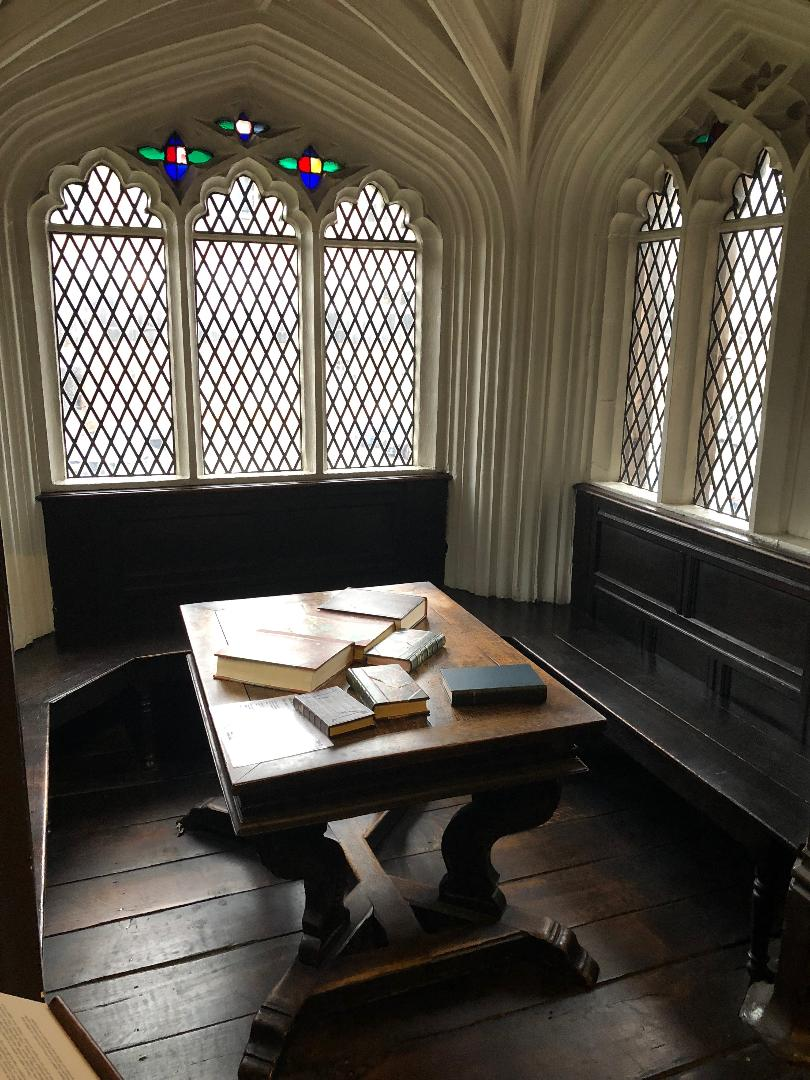
The window alcove in which Karl Marx and Friedrich Engels worked

Chetham's was the meeting place of Karl Marx and Friedrich Engels when Marx visited Manchester in the summer of 1845. Facsimiles of the economics books they studied can be seen on a table in the window alcove where they would meet. The research they undertook during this series of visits to the library led ultimately to their work, The Communist Manifesto. Therefore, the library acts as a site of historical importance for visiting communists.

Additions were made to the buildings by J. E. Gregan (1850s), Alfred Waterhouse (1878) (grade II listed), and J. Medland Taylor (1883–95). Manchester Grammar School was extended along Long Millgate in 1870. Manchester Grammar School moved to Fallowfield in the 1930s, and after standing empty for many years the original building was destroyed during the Second World War, leaving only its new block. This became part of Chetham's School of Music in 1978. The old college building, which became the music school in 1969, still incorporates Chetham's Library and is Grade I listed. A fragment of a 17th century cross was relocated to the library's gardens in 1913, and is listed at Grade II.

=== Librarians ===
Past librarians include Robert Thyer (1709–1781), who became Librarian in 1732. Peter Hordern (died 1836) was librarian and also the minister of St Clement's Chapel, Chorlton. Thomas Jones held the position from 1845 to 1875; during his time, the size of the library more than doubled (from 19,000 volumes to 40,000 volumes). He also produced a two-volume catalogue of the library's collection in 1862 and 1863.

== See also ==
- Francis Trigge Chained Library

== Sources ==
- Nicholls, Robert (2004). Curiosities of Greater Manchester. Stroud: Sutton Publishing. ISBN 0-7509-3661-4.
