= Solomon and Marcolf =

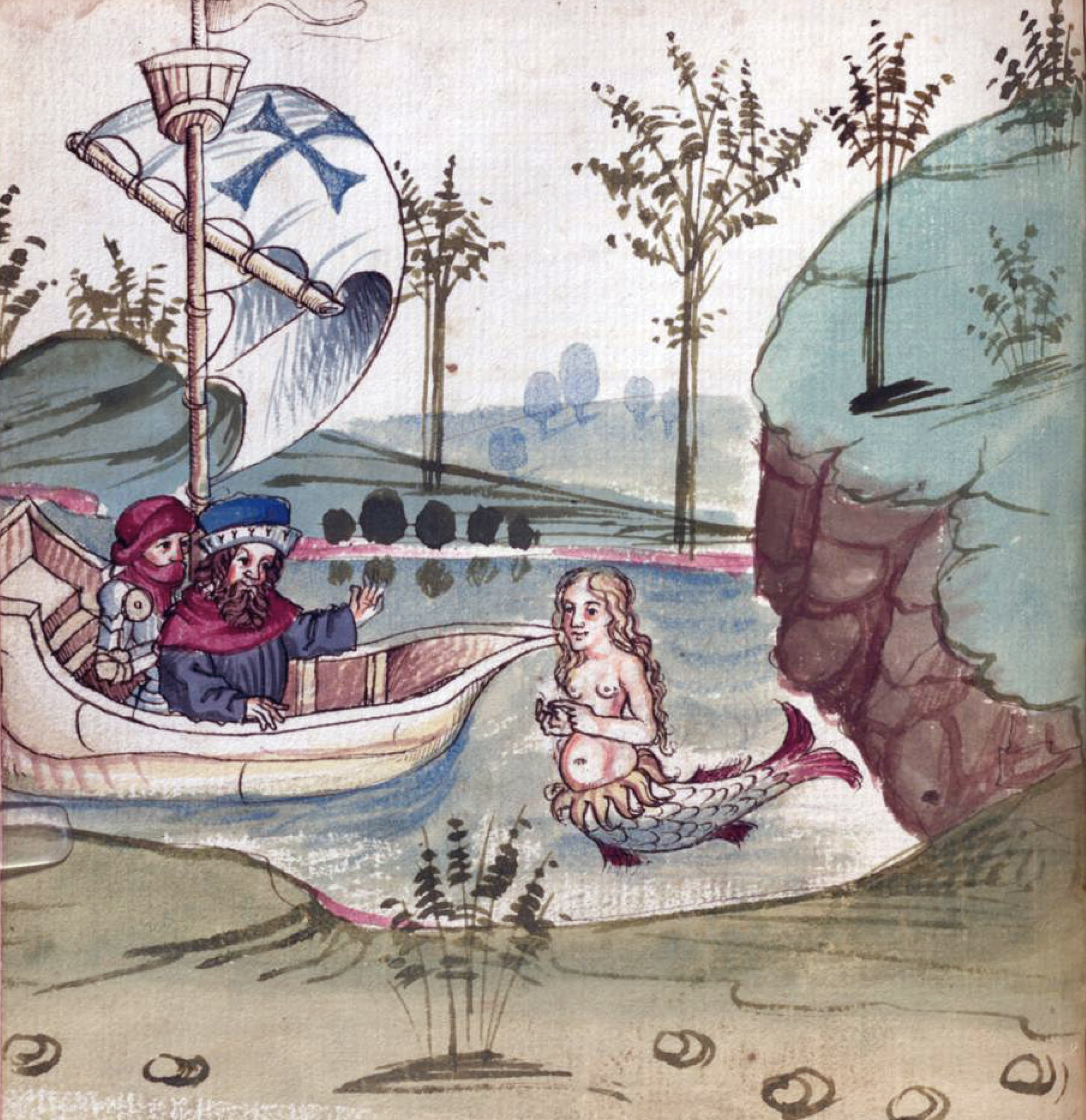
Illustration from "Salman und Morolf" by Hans Dirmstein, Frankfurt am Main 1479

Solomon and Marcolf is a medieval narrative describing the adventures and conversations of Solomon and Marcolf, or Marolf. The adventures have some connection with those of Ashmedai, while the conversations consist chiefly of riddles similar to those put to Solomon by the Queen of Sheba. The exact extent of its indebtedness to the Haggadah is somewhat doubtful, though it is practically certain that the various versions are derived from an Eastern original.

== Text and history ==
Solomon and Marcolf is conventionally dated to the 12th century, although the tale itself is older. In Polish, in 1521 in Krakow, a book was published, titled "The talks that the king Salomon the clever had with Marchołt [Marcolf, Markolf] fat and bawdy, however, as they say, very eloquent". The earliest known versions of the tale in Old English are the ones commonly referred to as Solomon and Saturn, first published by J. N. Kemble in 1848, for the Ælfric Society. The tale was popular in Germany, where Marcolf, or Marolf, became a sort of type of the "wise fool". It was first printed under the title Dis buch seit von kunig salomon vnd siner huß frouwen Salome wie sy der künig fore nam vnd wie sy Morolff künig salomon brüder wider brocht in Strasbourg by the printer Matthias Hupfuff in 1499, with woodcut illustrations. (Note: Woodcut illustrations only, of 1555 Strassburg edition printed in: Heitz, Paul (1922). Strassburger Holzschnitte zu Dietrich von Bern, Herzog Ernst, der Hürnen Seyfrid, Marcolphus. J.H. Ed. Heitz.) Latin versions of it were often appended to the "Epistolæ Obscurorum Virorum". Both Hans Folz and Hans Sachs made use of the legend. A French version was made by Pierre Mauclerc, Count of Brittany, in the thirteenth century.

In Italian, Giulio Cesare Croce adopted it in his "Bertoldo", another name for Marcolf. This was developed into a book at Bologna in 1736. Other versions occur in the Bolognese and Venetian dialects, and in Dutch, Greek, Polish, Icelandic, and Welsh. There are two editions in English, one published by Gerard Leeu (Antwerp, 1492), and another, Sayings or Proverbes of King Solomon, with the Answers of Marcolfus, printed by Richard Pynson in 1530, a version of the much shorter French Dictionnaire de Salomon.

== Commentary ==
Leonard Neidorf noted several common motifs between the poem and the earlier Latin epic poem Waltharius, such as intoxication as an escape ruse, one man fighting twelve attackers, and gratuitous beheadings. Neidorf posited that, rather than the author of Solomon and Marcolf being directly influenced by Waltharius, the similarities stem from a common derivation from the Germanic bridal-quest narrative tradition.

== Editions and translations ==
- Bradbury, Nancy Mason; Bradbury, Scott, eds. (2012). The dialogue of Solomon and Marcolf : a dual-language edition from Latin and Middle English printed editions (TEAMS/Project Camelot). Kalamazoo: Medieval Institute Publications. (in Latin and Middle English)
- Ziolkowski, Jan M. (tr.), ed. (2008). Solomon and Marcolf. Cambridge, MA: Department of the Classics, Harvard University. (in Latin) (w. trans.)
- Ziolkowski, Jan M. (tr.), ed. (2022). Solomon and Marcolf: Vernacular Traditions. Cambridge, MA: Harvard University Press.
- Menner, Robert J., ed. (1941). The poetical dialogues of Solomon and Saturn. New York: The Modern Language Association of America; London, Oxford University Press.
- Duff, E. Gordon, ed. (1892). The Dialogue or Communing Between the Wise King Solomon and Marcolfus. London: Lawrence and Bullen.
- Hagen, Friedrich Heinrich von der; Büsching, Johann Gustav, eds. (1808), "Salomon und Morolf", Deutsche Gedichte des Mittelalters, vol. 1, Berlin: Realschulbuchhandlung (in German)

== Studies ==
- MacCallum, Sir Mungo William (1884), "Salomon und Morolf", Studies in Low German and High German Literature, London: Kegan, Paul, Trench & Co., pp. 87–130
- Kemble, John Mitchell (1848). The Dialogue of Salomon and Saturnus: With an Historical Introduction. London: Aelfric Society.
