= History of the Rockaways from the Year 1685 to 1917 =

1918 book by Alfred Henry Bellot

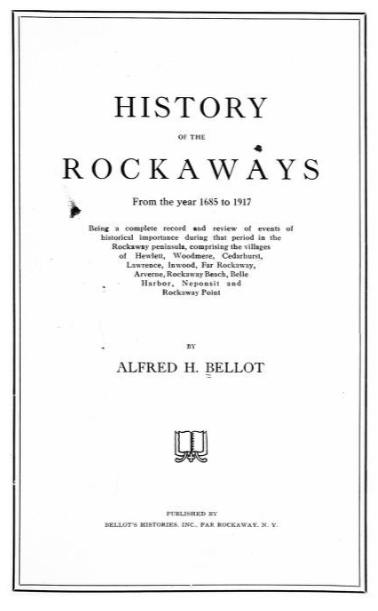
- Title page for History of the Rockaways from the Year 1685 to 1917 (1918)
- Author: Alfred Henry Bellot
- Language: English
- Genre: Non-fiction
- Publication date: 1918

History of the Rockaways from the Year 1685 to 1917 is a book by historian Alfred Henry Bellot (22 December 1882 Birmingham, England – 19 May 1965 Miami, Florida). Published in 1918, the work provides a definitive history up to that time of the communities on the Rockaway Peninsula in Queens County, New York City and the villages and hamlets which comprise what is known today as the Five Towns of Nassau County, Long Island, New York, namely Inwood, Lawrence, Cedarhurst, Woodmere and Hewlett.
