= Julia Sutcliffe =

- Education: University of Nottingham
- Scientific career
- Workplaces: BAE Systems; Department for Business and Trade
- Thesis: Quantum studies of molecular dynamics (1995)

Julia Sutcliffe is a British engineer who is an Honorary Professor and the Chief Scientific Advisor for the Department for Business and Trade. She previously served as a Chief Technology Officer at BAE Systems, where she was responsible for artificial intelligence, augmented reality and quantum technologies. She is a Fellow of the Royal Aeronautical Society and the Royal Academy of Engineering.

== Early life and education ==
Sutcliffe was born in Manchester in the 1960s. She grew up watching Tomorrow's World and reading educational books on animals. Her parents and grandparents took her to various engineering sites as a child, including the Humber Bridge, Harrier jump jet and Jodrell Bank Observatory. She attended an all girls grammar school in York, and studied physics, chemistry and mathematics at A-Level. She studied physics for her undergraduate degree. She earned a doctorate in physics at the University of Nottingham, where she performed quantum studies on molecules. After her doctorate, Sutcliffe travelled around Asia, visiting Nepal, Pakistan and Thailand.

== Research and career ==
Sutcliffe joined BAE Systems in 1996. Over the course of a twenty-six year career, she held various roles, including leading engineering for avionics and mission systems design authority. She worked at the field robotics centre at the University of Sydney, and developed collaborations across Australia. In 2010, she returned to the United Kingdom, where she was responsible for design of the mission systems. She was made responsible for Engineering for Training Services in 2014, where she developed real and virtual training environments for pilots and maintenance engineers. In 2019 Sutcliffe was appointed Chief Technology Officer for the Air Sector at BAE Systems.

In 2021, Sutcliffe was made an Honorary Professor at the University of Manchester. That year she was made a Fellow of the Royal Academy of Engineering and the Royal Aeronautical Society.

Sutcliffe was appointed Chief Scientific Adviser to the Department for Business and Trade in 2023. She works across various government departments to resolve cross-cutting challenges and accelerate impact.
