= Silvia Bellot =

Spanish motorsport official

- Born: 1985 or 1986 (age 40–41); Barcelona, Catalonia, Spain
- Occupation: Motorsport official
- Years active: 2001– present

Silvia Bellot (born 1985/1986) is a Spanish motorsport official who serves as a steward at Fédération Internationale de l'Automobile (FIA)-sanctioned events, the assistant manager of the Carlin Motorsport IndyCar Series team and was the FIA Race Director for Formula 2 and Formula 3 in 2020. The daughter of a racing executive, she was the first person from Spain to be on a panel of stewards at a Formula One race in 2011 and was part of the first all-female panel of stewards at a round of the World Rally Championship five years later.

== Early life ==
Bellot comes from Barcelona, Spain. Her father, Josep María Bellot, was involved in motor racing for more than 40 years and was the president of the Committee of Commissioners for Auto Rallies of the Real Federación Española de Automovilismo. She has two sisters. When she was about five to six years old, Bellot began watching Formula One racing and supported the three-time world champion Ayrton Senna. She was later taken to the local races by her father around two to three years later. Bellot sought a career in racing because it is one of a few sports where men and women compete against each other, though her mother dissuaded her from racing herself because she believed it was too dangerous. So, at the age of 16, she took an examination to be a routes marshal and passed. Bellot enrolled in a stewarding course two years after that and passed its final examination. She holds degrees in biology, fashion, business and design.

== Career ==
Bellot joined the officials committee of the Circuit de Catalunya and the Spanish Assembly with support from the Royal Automobile Club of Spain at the age of 18. Bellot later worked in Trofeo Maserati and the Copa Hyundai Coupé championships in Spain. She became permanent chairman of the stewards of the European Formula 3 Open, the Spanish Endurance Championship and was appointed a permanent steward of the International GT Open. Bellot also worked in other Spanish national championships. In 2009, she joined the trainee stewards programme that was established by the world governing body of motorsport, the Fédération Internationale de l'Automobile (FIA), as a means of inviting young officials to be observers at Formula One race weekends. Her first race was the 2009 Spanish Grand Prix, and she started working as a steward for Formula One's two main support series, the GP2 Series and the GP3 Series, in 2010.

In May 2011, Bellot was invited by the FIA to be on the panel of stewards at the Turkish Grand Prix, making her the first person from Spain to be appointed a permanent steward in Formula One. She assumed the same role at the Italian Grand Prix four months later. Afterwards, Bellot worked on the panel of stewards in more Formula One races, the World Touring Car Championship, the World Rally Championship (WRC), the Deutsche Tourenwagen Masters, the Macau Grand Prix, and the World Series by Renault. She subsequently became a member and ambassador of the FIA Women in Motorsport Commission, which represents women officials and volunteers in the motor sport industry. Bellot was named the Outstanding Official Award winner at the FIA's end-of-season awards ceremony in Istanbul in December 2012. For the 2016 Rally Catalunya, she was nominated by the Reial Automobil Club de Catalunya to be part of the WRC's first all-women panel of stewards in the history of the series. Bellot was employed by Carlin Motorsport as the assistant manager of its IndyCar Series team in February 2018 and continued as an FIA steward.

She was named the FIA Race Director of the Formula 2 and Formula 3 championships for 2020. Bellot was the youngest person and the first woman to hold those positions. She made her debut in the role at both of the support rounds for the 2020 Austrian Grand Prix.

She has been a Director for the Las Vegas Grand Prix since 2022 and is the current VP of Sporting and Race Operations for the event.

In 2024, she took on the role of Race Director for F1 Academy.
