= Simon N. Powell =

British cancer researcher and oncologist

- Born: February 13, 1955 (age 71); Manchester, England
- Education: University of Oxford; University of London
- Spouse: Naomi Joshi
- Scientific career
- Fields: Radiation Oncology and Breast Cancer Research
- Workplaces: Harvard University; Washington University in St. Louis; Memorial Sloan Kettering Cancer Center
- Website: The Simon Powell Lab

Simon N. Powell (born February 1955) is a British cancer researcher and radiation oncologist residing in New York City.

== Biography ==
Powell was born on February 13, 1955, in Manchester, England. Powell received the Bachelor of Medicine, Bachelor of Surgery in 1981 from the University of London and went on to complete his Ph.D. there in 1991, holding residencies at Whittington Hospital and Hammersmith Hospital in London and a fellowship at the Royal Marsden Hospital before being recruited and settling in America.

== Career ==
Powell held a fellowship at Harvard Medical School in 1991, becoming an instructor in 1992, and associate professor of radiation oncology in 1998. He then became clinical director of the Gillette Center for Women's Cancers, co-leader of the Harvard Breast Cancer Research Program, and leader of the DNA Repair/Radiation Biology Program. From 2004 to 2008 he served as professor and head of Radiation therapy/radiation oncology at the Washington University School of Medicine in St. Louis.

In 2008, Powell moved to New York to join Memorial Sloan Kettering Cancer Center and become the Chair of the Department of Radiation Oncology in Memorial Hospital with a joint appointment in Sloan Kettering Institute's Molecular Biology Program. He was also appointed to the faculties of the Gerstner Sloan Kettering Graduate School of Biomedical Science and Weill Cornell Graduate School of Medical Sciences. He also holds the Enid A. Haupt Chair in Radiation Oncology at the Center. His career has centered on understanding DNA repair alterations in cancer and how they can be used for the basis of selective cancer therapies. His clinical expertise is in the treatment of breast cancer.

== Memberships and significant positions ==
- Fellow of the Royal College of Radiologists of the United Kingdom
- Associate editor, International Journal of Cancer for eight years
- Associate editor, Radiation Research for 5 years
- Editorial board of the Journal of Cancer Biology and Therapy (now the International Journal of Cancer)
- Member, American Association for Cancer Research
- Member, Radiation Research Society

== Awards ==
- Fellow of the American Society for Radiation Oncology (FASTRO) 2014
- European Society for Theapeutic Radiology and Oncology (E.S.T.R.O.) Varian Award (1990)

== Selected publications ==
- Powell, Simon N.; Defrank, Jeffrey S.; Connell, Paul; Eogan, Maeve; Preffer, Frederic; Dombkowski, David; Tang, Wei; Friend, Stephen (1995). "Differential sensitivity of p53^{(-)} and p53^{(+)} cells to caffeine-induced radiosensitization and override of G2 delay". Cancer Research. 55 (8): 1643–8. PMID 7712468.
- Mekeel, Kristin L; Tang, Wei; Kachnic, Lisa A; Luo, Chen-Mei; Defrank, Jeffrey S; Powell, Simon N (1997). "Inactivation of p53 results in high rates of homologous recombination". Oncogene. 14 (15): 1847–57. doi:10.1038/sj.onc.1201143. PMID 9150391. S2CID 25122282.
- Xia, F.; Taghian, D.G.; DeFrank, J.S.; Zeng, Z.C.; Willers, H.; Iliakis, G.; Powell, S.N. (2001). "Deficiency of human BRCA2 leads to impaired homologous recombination but maintains normal nonhomologous end joining". Proceedings of the National Academy of Sciences. 98 (15): 8644–9. Bibcode:2001PNAS...98.8644X. doi:10.1073/pnas.151253498. PMC 37489. PMID 11447276.
- Zhang, J; Willers, H; Feng, Z; Ghosh, JC; Kim, S; Weaver, DT; Chung, JH; Powell, SN; Xia, F (2004). "Chk2 phosphorylation of BRCA1 regulates DNA double-strand break repair". Molecular and Cellular Biology. 24 (2): 708–18. doi:10.1128/MCB.24.2.708-718.2004. PMC 343805. PMID 14701743.
- Romanova, Larisa Y; Willers, Henning; Blagosklonny, Mikhail V; Powell, Simon N (2004). "The interaction of p53 with replication protein a mediates suppression of homologous recombination". Oncogene. 23 (56): 9025–33. doi:10.1038/sj.onc.1207982. PMID 15489903.
- Litman, Rachel; Peng, Min; Jin, Zhe; Zhang, Fan; Zhang, Junran; Powell, Simon; Andreassen, Paul R.; Cantor, Sharon B. (2005). "BACH1 is critical for homologous recombination and appears to be the Fanconi anemia gene product FANCJ". Cancer Cell. 8 (3): 255–65. doi:10.1016/j.ccr.2005.08.004. PMID 16153896.
- Zhang, Junran; Ma, Zhefu; Treszezamsky, Alejandro; Powell, Simon N (2005). "MDC1 interacts with Rad51 and facilitates homologous recombination". Nature Structural & Molecular Biology. 12 (10): 902–9. doi:10.1038/nsmb991. PMID 16186822. S2CID 24097999.
- Feng, Z.; Scott, S. P.; Bussen, W.; Sharma, G. G.; Guo, G.; Pandita, T. K.; Powell, S. N. (2010). "Rad52 inactivation is synthetically lethal with BRCA2 deficiency". Proceedings of the National Academy of Sciences. 108 (2): 686–91. doi:10.1073/pnas.1010959107. PMC 3021033. PMID 21148102.
- Bott, Matthew; Brevet, Marie; Taylor, Barry S; Shimizu, Shigeki; Ito, Tatsuo; Wang, Lu; Creaney, Jenette; Lake, Richard A; et al. (2011). "The nuclear deubiquitinase BAP1 is commonly inactivated by somatic mutations and 3p21.1 losses in malignant pleural mesothelioma". Nature Genetics. 43 (7): 668–72. doi:10.1038/ng.855. PMC 4643098. PMID 21642991.
- Riaz, N; Blecua, P; Lim, RS; Shen, R; Higginson, DS; Weinhold, N; Norton, L; Weigelt, B; Powell, SN; Reis-Filho, JS (11 October 2017). "Pan-cancer analysis of bi-allelic alterations in homologous recombination DNA repair genes". Nature Communications. 8 (1): 857. Bibcode:2017NatCo...8..857R. doi:10.1038/s41467-017-00921-w. PMC 5636842. PMID 29021619.
- Bakhoum, SF; Ngo, B; Laughney, AM; Cavallo, JA; Murphy, CJ; Ly, P; Shah, P; Sriram, RK; Watkins, TBK; Taunk, NK; Duran, M; Pauli, C; Shaw, C; Chadalavada, K; Rajasekhar, VK; Genovese, G; Venkatesan, S; Birkbak, NJ; McGranahan, N; Lundquist, M; LaPlant, Q; Healey, JH; Elemento, O; Chung, CH; Lee, NY; Imielenski, M; Nanjangud, G; Pe'er, D; Cleveland, DW; Powell, SN; Lammerding, J; Swanton, C; Cantley, LC (25 January 2018). "Chromosomal instability drives metastasis through a cytosolic DNA response". Nature. 553 (7689): 467–472. Bibcode:2018Natur.553..467B. doi:10.1038/nature25432. PMC 5785464. PMID 29342134.
