= Fee Plumley =

British-born digital artist, technology evangelist, and digital consultant

Fee Plumley is a British-born digital artist, technology evangelist, and digital consultant. They live in Australia and are a citizen. They worked for the Australia Council for the Arts on its "Arts content for the digital era" program, producing initiatives such as Geek in Residence and the Digital Culture Fund. Since 1997, They have collaborated with Douglas Rushkoff. They are a regular guest on the Australian Broadcasting Corporation's Download this Show on Radio National, where They talk about datamining.

== Career ==
Plumley got her creative start working in the theatre industry in North Wales, London, Leeds, and Manchester. She was a stage manager and a props artist in the United Kingdom. In 1996, she used the internet for the first time, invited to use it by a landlord in Brighton. Unhappy with her work in the theatre, she explored how to use the internet as art. Her work brings together literature, performance, and technologies such as mobile phones, social media, augmented reality, and Arduino. Her work explores "how creative people use technology to connect themselves and their ideas to other people".

=== Projects ===
==== the-phone-book ====
In 2000, Plumley started the-phone-book Limited with animator and filmmaker Ben Jones. The project was partially funded by the Arts Council of England. The company sought to "explore new technologies as they emerge and see what they can offer creative minds". Their program focused on creating platforms, running commissions, and educating artists and the public about how to use mobile phones to create and share their art. This included using mobile phones for creative writing, using 150 characters or less, similar to the Twitter platform.

==== reallybigroadtrip ====
In the first half of 2012, Plumley successfully crowdfunded A$27,000 through the website Pozible to fund a three-month cross-Australia road trip and art project. Plumley was A$10,000 short of her A$25,000 goal until Hugh Jackman, Amanda Palmer, and Neil Gaiman tweeted their support for the project. The project was successfully funded with a A$2,000 above the target being donated.

The goal of the project is to collaboratively make and share digital art with Australian and international "nomads" in residence and the people they meet along the journey. Plumley used the funding for travel costs and to purchase a bus which was outfitted with technological equipment, becoming a mobile workshop, exhibition space for art, technology lab, and home for Plumley during the project.

reallybigroadtrip is partnering with other artists in Australia and organizations to hold meet-ups organized via Twitter, collaborative sessions, screenings, and workshops.
