= Robert Thyer =

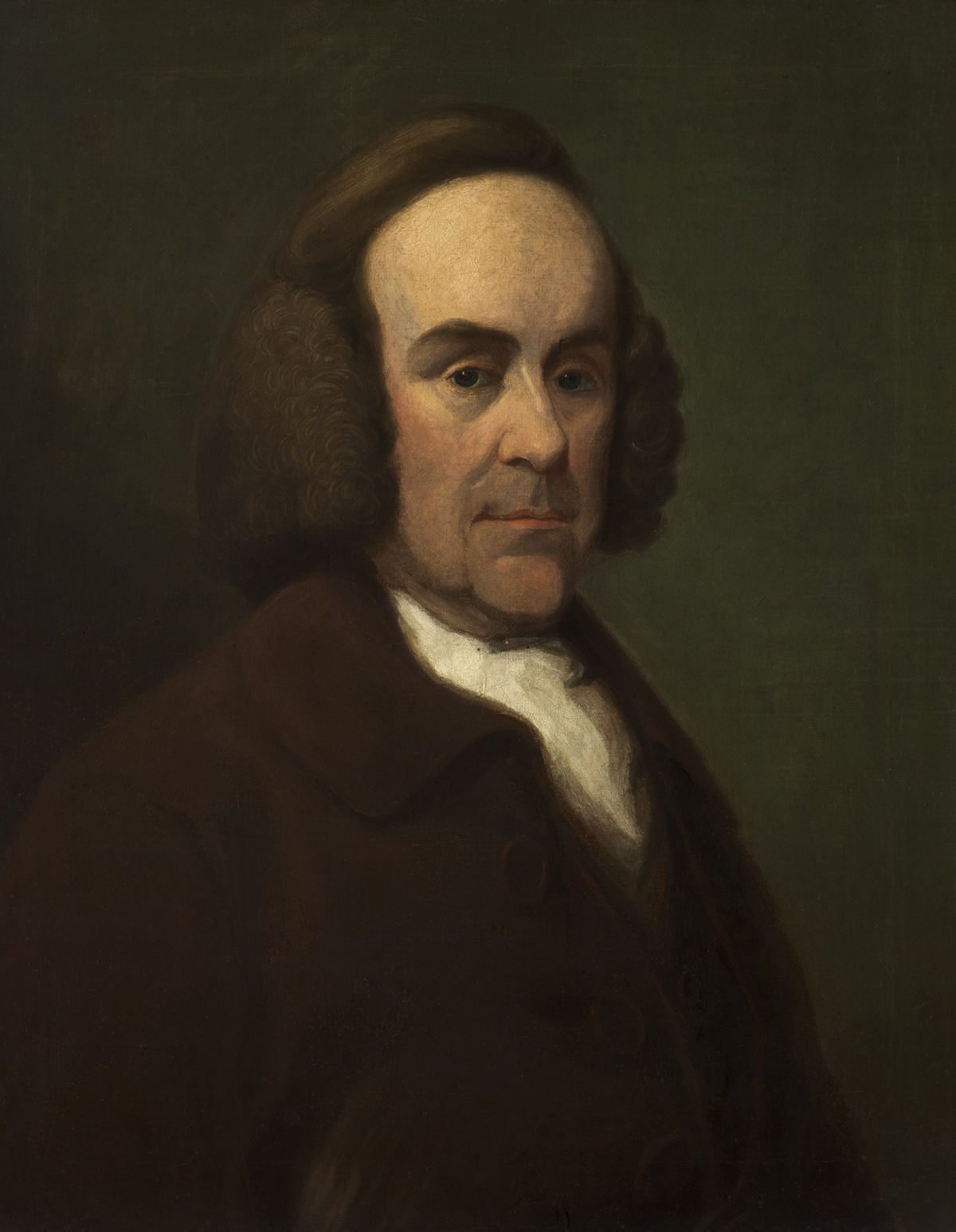
- Portrait by George Romney
- Born: 1709
- Died: 27 October 1781 (aged 71–72)
- Education: Brasenose College, Oxford
- Occupation: Librarian
- Employer: Chetham's Library

Robert Thyer (1709– 27 October 1781) was an 18th-century British writer and literary editor, best known as Chetham's Librarian. He was librarian from February 1732 to 3 October 1763 and, after his death, a number of his manuscripts were given to the Chetham's Library.

== Life ==
Son of Robert Thyer, a silk weaver of Manchester, by his wife Elizabeth Brabant, he was baptised on 20 February 1709 at Manchester Collegiate Church. Educated at Manchester Grammar School, he won an exhibition in 1727 to Brasenose College, Oxford, where he graduated as a BA on 12 October 1730, and was later elected FSA

Returning to Lancashire, Thyer was appointed as librarian of Chetham's Library in February 1732, and continued in post until 3 October 1763. A close friend of John Byrom, he was also on good terms with the Egertons of Tatton Park, Cheshire (his wife's first husband, John Leigh (who died in 1738), was a relation of the Earls of Bridgewater); Thyer was a legatee under the will of Samuel Egerton, M.P.

Thyer died on 27 October 1781 and was buried at Manchester Collegiate Church where his ancestors were buried.

== Legacy ==
Some of Thyer's manuscripts went to the Chetham Library, and many of his letters, as well as a specimen of his verse, were printed in Byrom's Remains.

== Works ==
Thyer annotated and published in 1759 The Genuine Remains in Verse and Prose of Samuel Butler, 2 vols., and contemplated a new annotated edition of Hudibras. He was working with papers left by Butler to William Longueville, patron and literary executor, and now in the British Library (Add. MS. 32625). Dr Samuel Johnson was complimentary, while Bishop William Warburton and others criticised Thyer. A new edition of the Remains came out in 1827. Thyer was also one of the scholars who supplied notes to Thomas Newton for his edition of John Milton's Paradise Lost.

== Family ==
Thyer married, on 9 December 1741, Silence, daughter of John Wagstaffe of Hasland Hall, Derbyshire, and widow of John Leigh of Middle Hulton near Deane, Lancashire, great-great-grandfather of Lydia Becker and uncle of Sir Egerton Leigh, 1st Baronet as too of Dr Egerton Leigh of West Hall, High Legh in Cheshire. Thyer's children all predeceased him.

== Notes ==
Attribution

This article incorporates text from a publication now in the public domain: Lee, Sidney, ed. (1898). "Thyer, Robert". Dictionary of National Biography. Vol. 56. London: Smith, Elder & Co.
