= Vincent Sellaer =

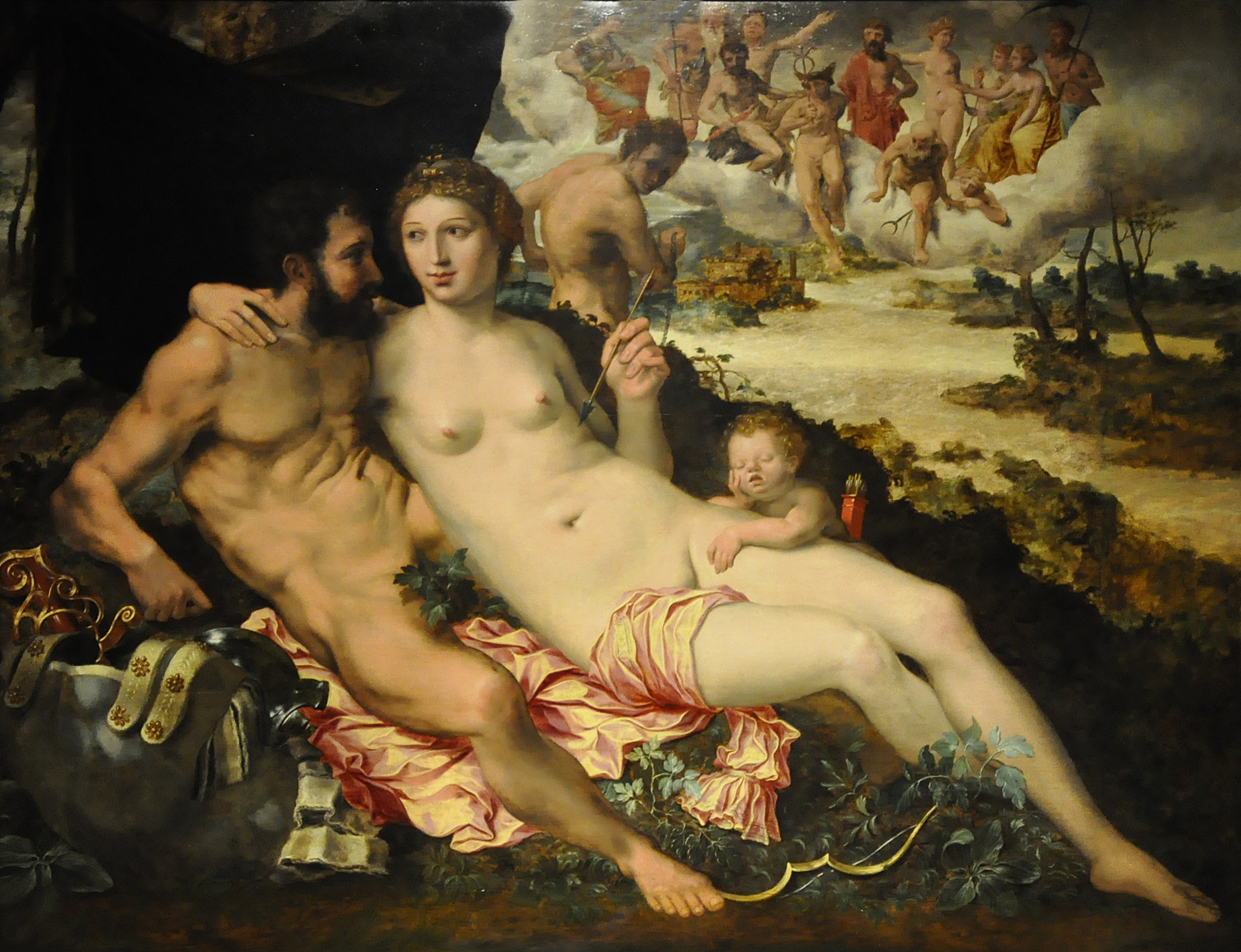
Mars and Venus Surprised by Vulcan

Vincent Sellaer (1490–1564), was a Flemish Renaissance painter known for his mythological and religious subjects. His works stand out through their monumentality of form and their mixing of Italian and northern styles.

== Life ==
Very few biographical details of this artist are known with any level of certainty. Nothing much is known about the artist other than that he flourished in Mechelen around 1538.

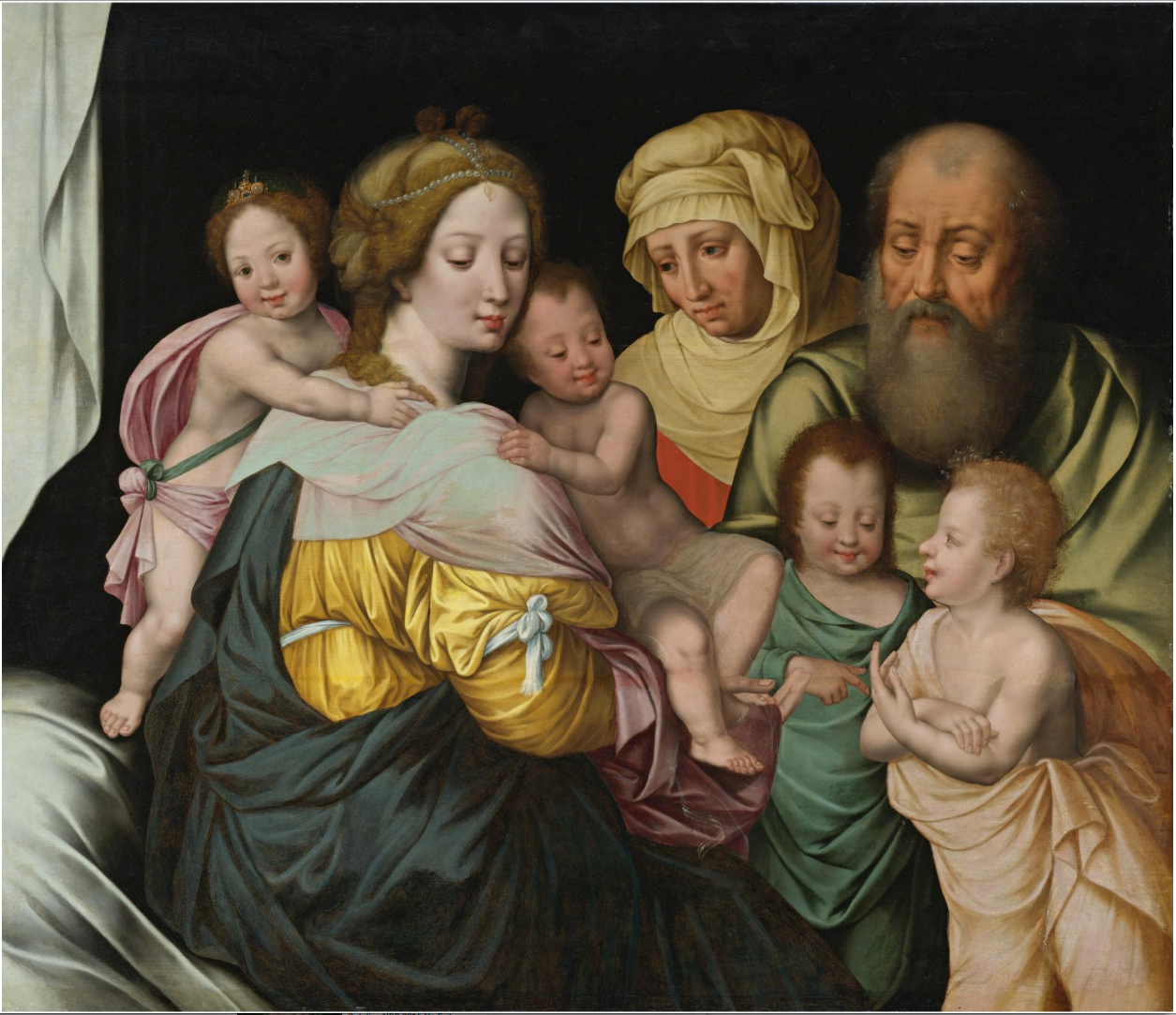
The Madonna and Child with Saints

While there is still no consensus among scholars, a majority believe that Vincent Sellaer should be identified with the artist to whom the early 17th century biographer Karel van Mander referred as Vincent Geldersman. Van Mander described Sellaer as a good painter of allegories, such as Leda with two eggs, Susanna and the elders, and Cleopatra with the asp. Van Mander mentioned him in his Life of Frans Minnebroer as one of the notable painters of Mechelen. While many known versions of a Leda and the Swan have been attributed to Sellaer, none has survived that depicts a Leda with eggs.

Some art historians such as G.J. Hoogewerff have speculated that Sellaer worked for some time in Brescia and may have visited other Italian cultural centres. This Italian stay would be situated in the years 1521 to 1524.

Scholars believe that Sellaer was the foremost painter in Mechelen, and his patrons were likely members of the court and the city's Great Council.

== Work ==
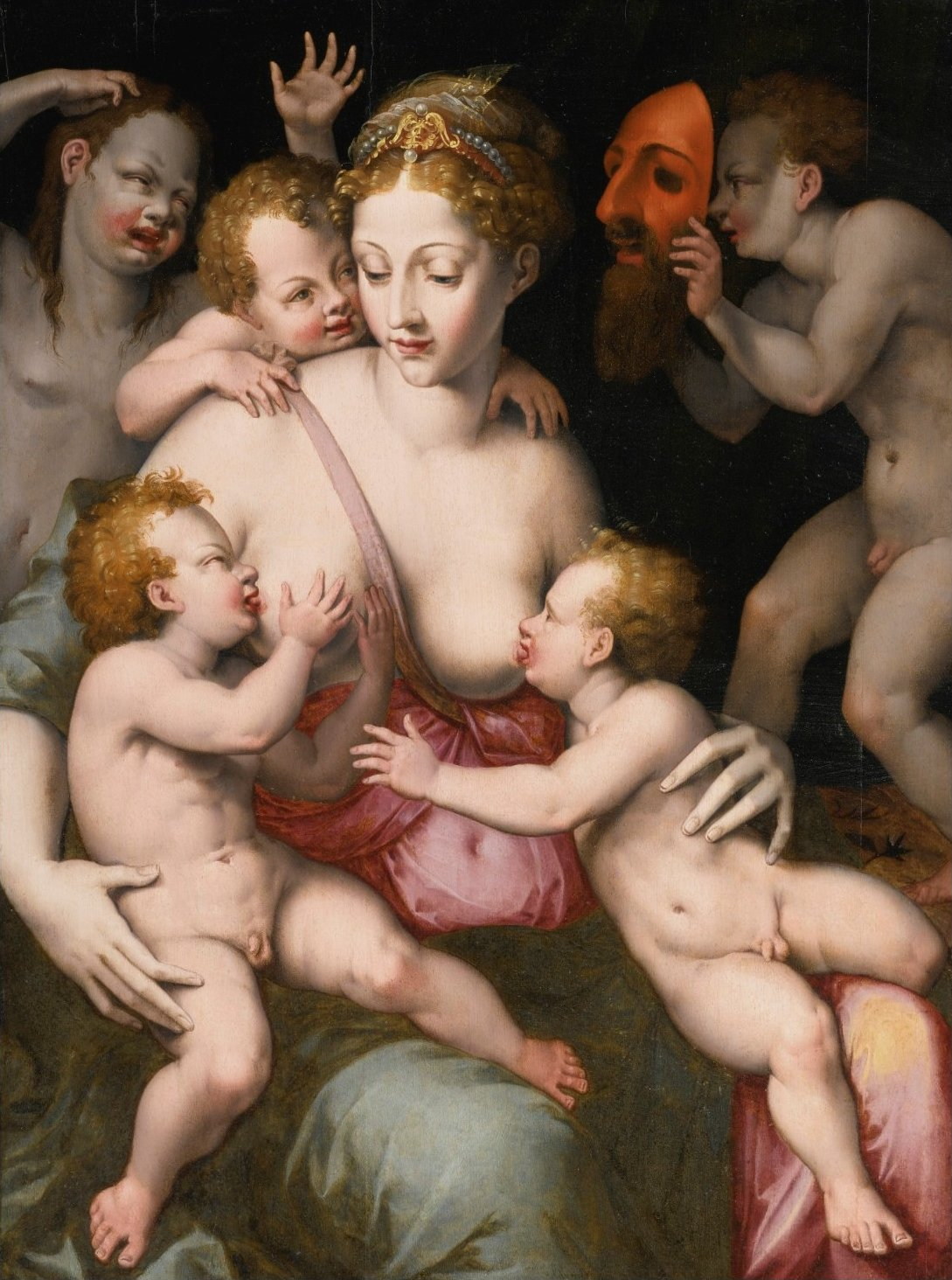
Charity

To date only a single signed and dated painting by Vincent Sellaer is known. It is the work entitled Christ blessing the Children now in the Alte Pinakothek in Munich. Based on the characteristics of this panel a whole series of works has now been attributed to Sellaer. Many of these works depict half-length central figures, with a mythological or Christian-inspired theme.

Based on his presumed Italian residence, roughly two large spheres of influence are distinguished. First, the influence of the leonardesque-Lombardian school and in particular that of da Vinci and Brescia masters such as Moretto da Brescia and Girolamo Romani. Secondly, a Florentine-Roman influence, particularly by Andrea del Sarto and the school of Raphael. Especially the later works, including the numerous versions of the Holy Family attributed to Sellaer, combine both influences. A third influence is that of the Venetian school as shown in the use of a typical Venetian colour scheme peculiar to Titian, Romani and Veronese. Sellaer's numerous depictions of putti call to mind the work of Moretto da Brescia. Typically Italian style characteristics such as sfumato and clair-obscur are used in Sellaer's work.

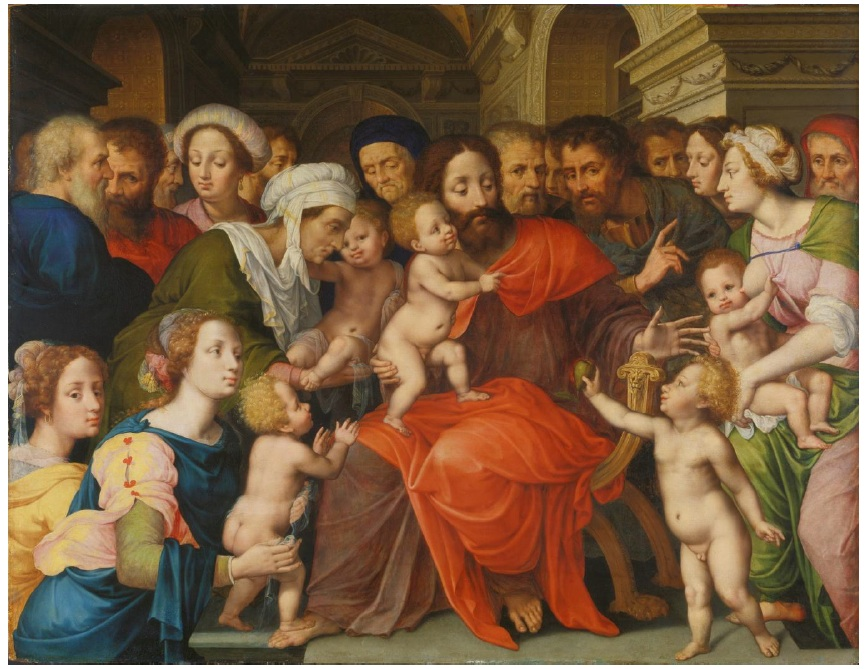
Christ Blessing the Children

The monumentality of form of Sellaer's paintings was almost unseen in the Low Countries at the time. His works usually include a half-length central figure facing forward while subsidiary figures at the back help clarify the story.

A theme to which Sellaer returned regularly was that of the Madonna and Child with Saints, also referred to as the Holy Kinship. An example is The Madonna and Child with Saints Elizabeth and other Members of the Holy Family (At Sotheby's on 28 January 2010 in New York, lot 253). As in many compositions of Sellaer, children play an important role in this painting by animating it with their movement and round smiling faces. The motif of a child climbing onto the back of the central female figure was one of Sellaer's favoured devices in these compositions. This is also reflected in another favourite theme of Sellaer, the depiction of the virtue of Charity, which in the sixteenth century was typically represented by a woman surrounded by infants.
