= Thomas Bellot =

English naval surgeon and philologist

Thomas Bellot (16 March 1806 - June 1857) was an English naval surgeon and philologist.

He was born at Manchester, where his father, after whom he was named, was a practising surgeon in Oldham Street. The father was a native of Derbyshire, and gave evidence in 1818 before a committee of the House of Lords on Sir Robert Peel's factory bill. His mother's maiden name was Jane Hale, and she was the daughter of Thomas Hale of Darnhall, Cheshire, author of Social Harmony, who claimed to be of the same family as Sir Matthew Hale. Thomas Bellot became a pupil at the Manchester Grammar School in 1816, after which he became a pupil of Joseph Jordan, a well-known practitioner in his native city. On 16 February 1828 he was admitted a member of the Royal College of Surgeons, and in 1831 entered upon the active service as a naval surgeon, in which he passed the greater part of his life. His first appointment was on the Harrier, where he joined in several boat attacks on the pirates infesting the straits of Malacca. In 1835 he joined the Leveret, and served in the prevention of the African slave trade until 1839. In this expedition he was one of the party that boarded the slave brig Diogenes, and had charge of the wounded prisoners until they were transferred to the hospital at Mozambique. He next served for three years with the Firefly on the West Indian coast. In 1843 he went with the Wolf to the coast of China. During his absence, and without his knowledge, he was elected F.R.C.S. causa honoris 6 August 1844.

In 1849 he had medical charge of the Havering, which conveyed 365 convicts to Sydney. Cholera broke out, but his firmness and judgment enabled him to dispense with the exercise of the great powers entrusted to him on this occasion. Some scientific maps and specimens sent by him to the admiralty from Labuan were forwarded to the Museum of Economic Geology.

His last outward voyage was in November 1854, when he joined the flagship Britannia, which conveyed Vice-Admiral Dundas to the Black Sea as commander of the fleet. Bellot was assigned the care of the sick at the naval hospital of Therapia on the Bosphorus, as one of the chief hospital surgeons, and returned to England in March 1855 in charge of invalids. This adventurous life was not without influence on his health, and during his stay in the West Indies he had two attacks of yellow fever. He returned to Manchester, and, dying in June 1857, was buried in the churchyard of Poynton, Cheshire.

He was honorary member of the Philosophical Society of Sydney, and of several other learned associations. The classical learning received at the Manchester school was increased by further study in the scanty leisure of his busy professional life. He translated the Aphorisms of Hippocrates and of Galen on the Hand (1840). In the latter he was helped by Joseph Jordan. His interest in philology led him to make excursions into the domain of oriental literature. In the intervals on half-pay he visited many cities of Europe, attended the lectures of H. H. Wilson at Oxford, made the acquaintance of Christian Bunsen, and was a friend and disciple of Franz Bopp. Bellot's work on the Sanscrit Derivations of English Words., printed at Manchester in 1856 by subscription, is in effect a comparative dictionary, in which a number of English words are traced to their source. The illustrations range over a wide field of philological knowledge, including Chinese.

He had paid considerable attention to the language and antiquities of China, and bequeathed his collection of Chinese books and bronzes to the Manchester Free Library.
