= 2026–27 Salford City F.C. season =

87th season in existence of Salford City FC

Salford City
2025–26 season
- Owner: Project 92 Limited
- Manager: Peter Cklamovski
- Stadium: Moor Lane

The 2026–27 season is the 87th season in the history of Salford City Football Club and their eighth consecutive season in League Two. In addition to the domestic league, the club are also participating in the FA Cup, the EFL Cup, and the EFL Trophy.

== Managerial changes ==
Prior to the season starting, Karl Robinson was dismissed of his duties as head coach. He was shortly replaced by Peter Cklamovski who was most recently the head coach of the Malaysia national team.

== Transfers and contracts ==
=== In ===
Date	Pos.	Player	From	Fee	Ref.
1 July 2026 (Note: The transfer was announced on 23 June, and would become official on July 1 once Aimson's contract at Wigan Athletic expired.)	CB	(England) Will Aimson	(England) Wigan Athletic	Free	
1 July 2026	GK	(Scotland) Sam Long	(England) Bromley	Free	
1 July 2026 (Note: The transfer was announced on 26 June, and would become official on July 1 once Norris' contract at Wycombe Wanderers expired.)	GK	(England) Will Norris	(England) Wycombe Wanderers	Free	
1 July 2026 (Note: The transfer was announced on 20 June, and would become official on July 1 once Powell's contract at Rotherham United expired.)	CM	(England) Joe Powell	(England) Rotherham United	Free	
2 July 2026	LW	(England) Abraham Odoh	(England) Peterborough United	Undisclosed	
3 July 2026	CF	(England) Macaulay Langstaff	(England) Millwall	Undisclosed	
14 July 2026	CDM	(Guyana) Elliot Bonds	(England) Fleetwood Town	Undisclosed	
28 July 2026	RW	(England) Luke Molyneux	(England) Doncaster Rovers	Undisclosed	
21 August 2026	CB	(England) Brendan Wiredu	(England) Plymouth Argyle	Undisclosed	
24 August 2026	GK	(England) Tom Myles	(England) Rochdale	Free	
1 September 2026	CB	(England) Dan Scarr	(Wales) Wrexham	Undisclosed	
11 September 2026	GK	(England) Lee Burge	(England) Northampton Town	Free	

=== Loaned in ===
Date	Pos.	Player	From	Loaned until	Ref.
28 August 2026	CB	(England) Taylor Allen	(England) Wycombe Wanderers	End of Season	
1 September 2026	RB	(Uganda) Nathan Asiimwe	(England) Charlton Athletic	End of Season	

=== Loaned out ===
Date	Pos.	Player	To	Loaned until	Ref.
26 June 2026	CB	(Republic of the Congo) Loick Ayina	(England) Yeovil Town	End of Season	
29 August 2026	CM	(England) Alfie Bairstow	(England) Marine	26 September 2026	
4 September 2026	CF	(England) Jay Bird	(England) Boreham Wood	3 October 2026	
5 September 2026	CM	(Republic of Ireland) Frankie McMahon-Brown	(England) Radcliffe	3 October 2026	
11 September 2026	CAM	(England) Ruben Butt	(England) Chester	2 January 2027	
11 September 2026	CF	(England) Riley Carroll	(England) Radcliffe	10 October 2026	
29 September 2026	CB	(England) Hayden Carson	(England) Tamworth	29 October 2026	
13 October 2026	RW	(England) Kyrell Malcolm	(England) AFC Fylde	3 January 2027	
5 November 2026	CM	(Scotland) Michael Hunter	(England) Southport	8 December 2026	

=== Out ===
Date	Pos.	Player	To	Fee	Ref.
27 August 2026	CM	(England) Josh Austerfield	(England) Rotherham United	Undisclosed	
2 September 2026	LB	(England) Rosaire Longelo	(England) Notts County	Undisclosed	

=== Released / Out of Contract ===
Date	Pos.	Player	Subsequent club	Joined date	Ref.
30 June 2026	LW	(England) Kadeem Harris	(England) Gillingham	1 July 2026	
30 June 2026	CM	(Australia) Jai Curran-Nicholls	(England) Hednesford Town	3 July 2026	
30 June 2026	CF	(England) Cole Stockton	(England) Accrington Stanley	9 July 2026	
30 June 2026	CDM	(England) Ossama Ashley	(England) Rotherham United	10 July 2026	
30 June 2026	GK	(England) Ellis Craven	(England) Radcliffe	31 July 2026	
30 June 2026	GK	(England) Mackenzie Chapman			
30 June 2026	RM	(England) Daniel Chesters			
30 June 2026	CF	(Canada) Robbie Cleary			
30 June 2026	CAM	(Spain) Khadim Diop			
30 June 2026	LWB	(England) Jake Dodd			
30 June 2026	CM	(England) Alfie Henderson			
30 June 2026	GK	(England) Mark Howard			
30 June 2026	RB	(England) Luca Jackson			
30 June 2026	CM	(England) Joel Kane			
30 June 2026	CB	(England) Jacob Lara			
30 June 2026	CDM	(England) Billy Midgley			
30 June 2026	RWB	(Tanzania) Haji Mnoga	(Belgium) Patro Eisden Maasmechelen		
30 June 2026	CDM	(England) Brad Mundy			
30 June 2026	CF	(England) Harry Showman			
30 June 2026	RWB	(England) Luke Simmons			
30 June 2026	GK	(England) James Wright			
30 June 2026	CF	(Italy) Fabio Borini	Retired		
30 June 2026	RB	(England) Tom Edwards	Retired		

=== New contract ===
Date	Pos.	Player	Contract until	Ref.
6 May 2026	CDM	(Sierra Leone) Kallum Cesay	30 June 2028	
8 May 2026	CB	(Nigeria) Adebola Oluwo	30 June 2028	
1 June 2026	CM	(England) Josh Austerfield	30 June 2027	
1 June 2026	LB	(England) Rosaire Longelo	30 June 2027	
1 June 2026	LW	(England) Kyrell Malcolm	30 June 2027	
1 June 2026	LM	(Netherlands) Kelly N'Mai	30 June 2027	
1 June 2026	CAM	(Wales) Ben Woodburn	30 June 2027	
10 July 2026	RB	(England) Ollie Turton	30 June 2027	

== Pre-season and friendlies ==
On 22 June, Salford announced pre-season friendlies - against FC United of Manchester, Dundee United, Carlisle United and Bradford City.

Win Draw Loss Fixtures

18 July 2026 Friendly	FC United of Manchester	1–4	Salford City	Moston
15:00 BST	Grivosti 57'		Udoh 33'; Longelo 52'; Graydon 61'; Bird 90+2'	Stadium: Broadhurst Park

25 July 2026 Friendly	Salford City	3–2	Dundee United	Kersal
15:00 BST	Langstaff 10'; Oluwo 45'; Austerfield 84'		Metsoko 65'; Forrest 89'	Stadium: AIG Stadium

28 July 2026 Friendly	Carlisle United	0–2	Salford City	Carlisle
19:30 BST			Langstaff 14', 56'	Stadium: Brunton Park

1 August 2026 Friendly	Salford City	2–2	Bradford City	Kersal
15:00 BST	Langstaff 32'; Powell 54'		Phillips 45+2'; Powell 57'	Stadium: AIG Stadium

== Competitions ==
=== League Two ===
==== League table ====
Pos	Team	Pld	W	D	L	GF	GA	GD	Pts	Promotion, qualification or relegation
1	Salford City	15	10	2	3	26	16	+10	32	Promotion to EFL League One
2	Barnet	13	7	5	1	28	18	+10	26	Promotion to EFL League One
3	Grimsby Town	15	6	5	4	28	19	+9	23	Promotion to EFL League One
4	York City	15	6	5	4	25	21	+4	23	Qualification for League Two play-offs
5	Crewe Alexandra	15	5	8	2	19	19	0	23	Qualification for League Two play-offs

Updated to match(es) played on 14 November 2026. Source: EFL Official Website
Rules for classification: 1) Points; 2) Goal difference; 3) Number of goals scored; 4) Head-to-head results; 5) Wins; 6) Away goals; 7) Penalty points (sec 9.5); 8) 12-point sending off offences

==== Results summary ====
Overall								Home						Away					
Pld	W	D	L	GF	GA	GD	Pts	W	D	L	GF	GA	GD	W	D	L	GF	GA	GD
15	10	2	3	26	16	+10	32	6	1	1	10	5	+5	4	1	2	16	11	+5

Last updated: 14 November 2026.
Source: Soccerway

==== Results by round ====
Round	1	2	3	4	5	6	7	8	9	10	11	12	13	14	15	16	17	18	19	20	21	22	23	24	25	26	27	28	29	30	31
Ground	A	H	A	H	H	A	H	A	H	A	H	A	A	H	H	A	H	A	H	A	H	A	A	H	A	H	H	A	H	A	A
Result	L	L	L	W	W	D	W	W	W	W	W	W	W	W	D																
Position	20	22	23	20	15	15	12	7	1	1	1	1	1	1	1																
Points	0	0	0	3	6	7	10	13	16	19	22	25	28	31	32																

Source: EFL
A = Away; H = Home; W = Win; D = Draw; L = Loss; P = Postponed

==== Matches ====
On 25 June, the League Two fixtures were revealed.

Win Draw Loss Fixtures

15 August 2026 1	Barnet	3–1	Salford City	Edgware
15:00 BST	Gallagher 24', (yellow card) 79'; Lakin 42'; Tshimanga 87'	Report	Turton (yellow card) 23'; Powell (yellow card) 37'; Molyneux (yellow card) 59'; Oluwo 90'	Stadium: The Hive Stadium; Attendance: 2,230 (255 Salford fans); Referee: Richard Eley

22 August 2026 2	Salford City	0–1	Chesterfield	Kersal
12:30 BST	Garbutt (yellow card) 57'; Wiredu (yellow card) 90+5'	Report	Bonis 2'; Mandeville (yellow card) 44'; Simpson (yellow card) 53'; Lamptey (yellow card) 90+4'	Stadium: AIG Stadium; Referee: Scott Oldham
Note: Fixture was initially scheduled for a 15:00 kick-off, but was brought forward for live Sky Sports.

29 August 2026 3	Shrewsbury Town	1–0	Salford City	Shrewsbury
15:00 BST	Boyle 74'; Anderson (yellow card) 86'	Report		Stadium: Croud Meadow; Attendance: 4,638 (284 away); Referee: Alan Dale

1 September 2026 4	Salford City	2–1	Newport County	Kersal
19:45 BST	Graydon (yellow card) 68'; Allen 83'; N'Mai 90'	Report	Thomas (yellow card) 14'; Biggins 71'; Merritt (yellow card) 79'; Norman (yellow card) 86'	Stadium: AIG Stadium; Attendance: 2,151; Referee: Matthew Russell

5 September 2026 5	Salford City	1–0	Port Vale	Kersal
12:30 BST	Powell 52'; Langstaff (yellow card) 64'	Report	Dempsey (yellow card) 51'; Montsma (yellow card) 55'	Stadium: AIG Stadium; Attendance: 3,558; Referee: Ben Atkinson
Note: Fixture was initially scheduled for a 15:00 kick-off, but was brought forward for live Sky Sports.

12 September 2026 6	Rotherham United	3–3	Salford City	Rotherham
15:00 BST	Hall (yellow card) 26'; Cover 33'; Mullin 35' (pen.); Ashley 55'; Austerfield (yellow card) 64'; Buyabu (yellow card) 73'	Report	Graydon 9'; Powell 31'; Cesay (yellow card) 44'; Odoh (yellow card) 55' (yellow-red card) 69'; Langstaff 74' (pen.)	Stadium: AESSEAL New York Stadium; Attendance: 7,528; Referee: Dean Whitestone

19 September 2026 7	Salford City	1–0	Swindon Town	Kersal
15:00 BST	Powell 77'		Ball (yellow card) 43'; Clarke (yellow card) 71'; Debayo (yellow card) 87'	Stadium: AIG Stadium; Referee: Neil Hair

26 September 2026 8	Oldham Athletic	1–4	Salford City	Oldham
17:30 BST	Kavanagh 21'	Report	Molyneux 5'; N'Mai 19'; Odoh (yellow card) 34'; Langstaff (yellow card) 45+2'; Wiredu 57'; Oluwo 81'	Stadium: Boundary Park; Attendance: 8,071 (849 away); Referee: Isaac Searle
Note: Fixture was initially scheduled for a 15:00 kick-off, but was pushed back for live Sky Sports.

3 October 2026 9	Salford City	1–0	Fleetwood Town	Kersal
15:00 BST	Wiredu (yellow card) 4'; Langstaff 65'	Report	Coughlan (yellow card) 84'	Stadium: AIG Stadium; Referee: Ross Martin

10 October 2026 10	Cheltenham Town	0–2	Salford City	Cheltenham
15:00 BST	Willcox (yellow card) 6'; Evans (yellow card) 20'; Tomkinson (yellow card) 57'; Shipley (yellow card) 64'; Stevenson (red card) 78'; Weimann (yellow card) 85'	Report	Odoh (yellow card) 49'; Molyneux (yellow card) 56'; Aimson (yellow card) 71'; Grant 84', 90+3'; Garbutt (yellow card) 90+7'	Stadium: EV Charger Points Stadium; Attendance: 4,023; Referee: David Rock

17 October 2026 11	Salford City	2–1	Crawley Town	Kersal
15:00 BST	Langstaff 17', 50'	Report	Morgan 59'	Stadium: AIG Stadium; Referee: Scott Jackson

20 October 2026 12	Bristol Rovers	1–2	Salford City	Horfield
19:45 BST	Balmer (yellow card) 37'; Kelly (yellow card) 38'; Forde (yellow card) 41'; Harrison (penalty missed) 54'; Sparkes 57'; Gough (yellow card) 90+3'	Report	Wiredu 6'; Udoh 20'; Bonds (yellow card) 29'; Graydon (yellow card) 45+1'; Garbutt (yellow card) 48'	Stadium: Memorial Stadium; Attendance: 6,895; Referee: Dean Whitestone

26 October 2026 13	Walsall	2–4	Salford City	Bescot
20:00 BST	Pressley 58'; Simper 66'; Moore (yellow card) 70'	Report	Langstaff 45'; Grant 54'; Cesay 67'; Oluwo 82'	Stadium: Pallet-Track Bescot Stadium; Attendance: 6,395; Referee: Martin Coy
Note: Fixture was initially scheduled for 24 October, but was pushed back a couple days for live Sky Sports broadcasting.

31 October 2026 14	Salford City	2–1	Exeter City	Kersal
15:00 GMT	Norris (yellow card) 24'; Bonds (yellow card) 44'; Wiredu (yellow card) 45+3'; Garbutt 66'; Aimson 88'	Report	Cox 34'; Woodhouse (yellow card) 49'	Stadium: AIG Stadium; Attendance: 2,919; Referee: Oliver Langford

14 November 2026 15	Salford City	1–1	Northampton Town	Kersal
15:00 GMT	Butcher (yellow card) 19'; Cesay 64'	Report	Moore 2'; O'Brien-Whitmarsh (yellow card) 17'; Maxwell (yellow card) 31'; Dale (yellow card) 51'	Stadium: AIG Stadium; Attendance: 3,525; Referee: Ben Toner

21 November 2026 16	Accrington Stanley	v	Salford City	Accrington
15:00 GMT				Stadium: Wham Stadium

28 November 2026 17	Salford City	v	Gillingham	Kersal
15:00 GMT				Stadium: AIG Stadium

5 December 2026 18	Tranmere Rovers	v	Salford City	Birkenhead
15:00 GMT				Stadium: Prenton Park
Note: Fixtures was initially scheduled for 1 December, but was mutually agreed to be pushed back to the weekend to allow more fans to attend.

12 December 2026 19	Salford City	v	Colchester United	Kersal
15:00 GMT				Stadium: AIG Stadium

17 December 2026 20	Crewe Alexandra	v	Salford City	Crewe
20:00 GMT				Stadium: Mornflake Stadium
Note: Fixture was initially scheduled for 19 December, but was brought forward a couple days for live Sky Sports broadcasting.

26 December 2026 21	Salford City	v	Grimsby Town	Kersal
15:00 GMT				Stadium: AIG Stadium

29 December 2026 22	Rochdale	v	Salford City	Spotland
19:45 GMT				Stadium: Crown Oil Arena

1 January 2027 23	York City	v	Salford City	Huntington
15:00 GMT				Stadium: LNER Community Stadium

9 January 2027 24	Salford City	v	Crewe Alexandra	Kersal
15:00 GMT				Stadium: AIG Stadium

16 January 2027 25	Crawley Town	v	Salford City	Crawley
15:00 GMT				Stadium: Broadfield Stadium

19 January 2027 26	Salford City	v	Bristol Rovers	Kersal
19:45 GMT				Stadium: AIG Stadium

23 January 2027 27	Salford City	v	Walsall	Kersal
12:30 GMT				Stadium: AIG Stadium
Note: Fixture was initially scheduled for a 15:00 kick-off, but was brought forward for live Sky Sports broadcasting.

30 January 2027 28	Exeter City	v	Salford City	Exeter
15:00 GMT				Stadium: St James Park

6 February 2027 29	Salford City	v	Shrewsbury Town	Kersal
15:00 GMT				Stadium: AIG Stadium

9 February 2027 30	Newport County	v	Salford City	Newport
19:45 GMT				Stadium: Rodney Parade

13 February 2027 31	Port Vale	v	Salford City	Burslem
12:30 GMT				Stadium: Vale Park
Note: Fixture was initially scheduled for a 15:00 kick-off, but was brought forward for live Sky Sports broadcasting.

=== FA Cup ===
Salford were drawn away to Carlisle United in the first round.

Win Draw Loss Fixtures

7 November 2026 First round	Carlisle United	1–0	Salford City	Carlisle
15:00 GMT	Wearne (yellow card) 25'; Ajiboye 44'; Nicholson (yellow card) 45+3'	Report	Garbutt (yellow card) 20'; Allen (yellow card) 33'; Graydon (penalty missed) 36'	Stadium: Brunton Park; Attendance: 5,641; Referee: Paul Marsden

=== EFL Cup ===
Salford were drawn at home to Shrewsbury Town in the first round.

Win Draw Loss Fixtures

8 August 2026 First round	Salford City	1–1 (3–4 p)	Shrewsbury Town	Kersal
15:00 BST	Butcher (yellow card) 13'; Oluwo (yellow card) 68'; Malcolm 77'; Aimson (red card) 90+7'	Report	Davison 47'; Stubbs (yellow card) 60' (yellow-red card) 74'; Jude-Boyd (yellow card) 90+1'; Lloyd (yellow card) 90+7'	Stadium: Moor Lane; Attendance: 1,936; Referee: Oliver Mackey
	Penalties
	Langstaff (penalty missed); Grant (penalty scored); Powell (penalty scored); Udoh (penalty missed); Graydon (penalty missed); Odoh (penalty missed); Oluwo (penalty scored); Turton (penalty scored)		Sang (penalty missed); Gbodé (penalty scored); Turner-Cooke (penalty scored); Price (penalty missed); Ruffels (penalty missed); Hoole (penalty missed); Boyle (penalty scored); Jude-Boyd (penalty scored)

=== EFL Trophy ===
==== Group stage ====
Salford were drawn against Sheffield Wednesday, Accrington Stanley and Sunderland U21 into Northern Group A.

Pos	Div	Team	Pld	W	PW	PL	L	GF	GA	GD	Pts	Qualification
1	L2	Accrington Stanley	3	1	2	0	0	8	4	+4	7	Advance to Round 2
2	L1	Sheffield Wednesday	3	2	0	0	1	4	5	−1	6	Advance to Round 2
3	L2	Salford City	2	0	0	1	1	2	3	−1	1	
4	ACA	Sunderland U21	2	0	0	1	1	3	5	−2	1	

Updated to match(es) played on 11 October 2026. Source: EFL

Win Draw Loss Fixtures

22 September 2026 Group stage	Salford City	1–2	Sheffield Wednesday	Kersal
19:00 BST	Woodburn 34', (yellow card) 75'; Butcher (yellow card) 45+2'; Awe (yellow card) 69'; Graydon (yellow card) 73'	Report	Keillor-Dunn 55'; Heskey (yellow card) 57'; Lowe 77' (pen.)	Stadium: AIG Stadium; Referee: Aaron Jackson

6 October 2026 Group stage	Accrington Stanley	1–1	Salford City	Accrington
19:00 BST	Henderson (yellow card) 86'; Tutonda 90+8'		Udoh 51'; Butcher (yellow card) 74'	Stadium: Wham Stadium; Attendance: 610; Referee: Garreth Rhodes
	Penalties
	Mols (penalty scored); Brown (penalty scored); Anderson (penalty scored); Woods (penalty scored); Henderson (penalty scored)		(penalty scored) Garbutt; (penalty missed) Oluwo; (penalty scored) Cooper; (penalty scored) Mariani; (penalty scored) Graydon

10 November 2026 Group stage	Salford City	v	Sunderland U21	Kersal
19:00 GMT				Stadium: AIG Stadium

== Statistics ==
=== Appearances and goals ===
As of match played 14 November 2026

Players with no appearances are not included on the list; italics indicate loaned in player

No.	Pos	Nat	Player	Total		League Two		FA Cup		EFL Cup		EFL Trophy	
No.	Pos	Nat	Player	Apps	Goals	Apps	Goals	Apps	Goals	Apps	Goals	Apps	Goals
1	GK	(England) ENG	Will Norris	16	0	15+0	0	0+0	0	1+0	0	0+0	0
2	DF	(Uganda) UGA	Nathan Asiimwe	8	0	0+7	0	0+0	0	0+0	0	1+0	0
3	DF	(England) ENG	Zach Awe	3	0	1+0	0	0+0	0	0+0	0	2+0	0
4	DF	(England) ENG	Will Aimson	16	1	13+1	1	0+0	0	1+0	0	1+0	0
6	MF	(England) ENG	Joe Powell	10	3	8+1	3	0+0	0	1+0	0	0+0	0
7	MF	(Wales) WAL	Ben Woodburn	9	1	4+3	0	1+0	0	0+0	0	1+0	1
8	MF	(England) ENG	Jorge Grant	15	3	5+8	3	0+0	0	0+1	0	1+0	0
9	FW	(England) ENG	Macaulay Langstaff	17	5	14+1	5	0+1	0	1+0	0	0+0	0
10	MF	(Netherlands) NED	Kelly N'Mai	11	2	6+4	2	0+0	0	1+0	0	0+0	0
14	FW	(England) ENG	Abraham Odoh	15	0	10+2	0	0+1	0	0+1	0	1+0	0
15	DF	(Wales) WAL	Brandon Cooper	3	0	0+0	0	1+0	0	0+0	0	2+0	0
16	MF	(Guyana) GUY	Elliot Bonds	11	0	8+2	0	1+0	0	0+0	0	0+0	0
17	DF	(England) ENG	Dan Scarr	10	0	9+1	0	0+0	0	0+0	0	0+0	0
18	MF	(England) ENG	Matt Butcher	13	0	3+6	0	1+0	0	1+0	0	2+0	0
19	FW	(Republic of Ireland) IRL	Ryan Graydon	13	1	5+4	1	1+0	0	0+1	0	1+1	0
20	DF	(England) ENG	Ollie Turton	9	0	3+2	0	1+0	0	1+0	0	1+1	0
21	DF	(Sierra Leone) SLE	Kallum Cesay	14	2	7+4	2	0+1	0	1+0	0	1+0	0
22	DF	(Nigeria) NGR	Adebola Oluwo	17	3	10+3	3	1+0	0	1+0	0	1+1	0
23	FW	(Nigeria) NGR	Daniel Udoh	18	2	4+10	1	1+0	0	0+1	0	1+1	1
24	DF	(England) ENG	Taylor Allen	13	1	10+2	1	1+0	0	0+0	0	0+0	0
26	GK	(England) ENG	Lee Burge	3	0	0+0	0	1+0	0	0+0	0	2+0	0
29	DF	(England) ENG	Luke Garbutt	12	1	5+4	1	1+0	0	0+0	0	2+0	0
30	FW	(England) ENG	Kyrell Malcolm	5	1	0+2	0	0+0	0	0+1	1	2+0	0
33	DF	(England) ENG	Hayden Carson	2	0	1+0	0	0+0	0	1+0	0	0+0	0
35	MF	(England) ENG	Paolo Mariani	1	0	0+0	0	0+0	0	0+0	0	0+1	0
38	MF	(Republic of Ireland) IRL	Frankie McMahon-Brown	1	0	0+0	0	0+0	0	0+0	0	0+1	0
43	FW	(England) ENG	Luke Molyneux	14	1	13+0	1	0+0	0	1+0	0	0+0	0
44	DF	(England) ENG	Brendan Wiredu	15	2	11+3	2	0+1	0	0+0	0	0+0	0

== Awards ==
=== Player awards ===
==== EFL League Two Player of the Month ====
Month	Player	Result	Ref.
September	(England) Joe Powell	Nominated	
October	(England) Brendan Wiredu	Nominated	

==== PFA League Two Fans' Player of the Month ====
Month	Player	Result	Ref.
October	(England) Macaulay Langstaff	Nominated	
October	(England) Jorge Grant	Nominated	

=== Manager awards ===
==== EFL League Two Manager of the Month ====
Month	Manager	Result	Ref.
September	(Australia) Peter Cklamovski	Won	
October	(Australia) Peter Cklamovski	Won	
