= 2025–26 Salford City F.C. season =

86th season in existence of Salford City FC

Salford City F.C.
2025–26 season
- Owner: Project 92 Limited
- Head coach: Karl Robinson
- Stadium: Moor Lane
- League Two: 4th
- FA Cup: Fourth round
- EFL Cup: First round
- EFL Trophy: Round of 32
Home colours	Away colours

The 2025–26 season is the 86th season in the history of Salford City Football Club and their seventh consecutive season in League Two. In addition to the domestic league, the club are also participating in the FA Cup, the EFL Cup, and the EFL Trophy.

== Transfers and contracts ==
=== In ===
Date	Pos.	Player	From	Fee	Ref.
5 June 2025	RB	(Sierra Leone) Kallum Cesay	(England) Wealdstone	Undisclosed	
26 June 2025	CF	(England) Jay Bird	(England) Exeter City	Undisclosed	
1 July 2025 (Note: The transfer was announced on 27 June, and would become official on July 1 once his contract at Huddersfield had expired)	CB	(Republic of the Congo) Loick Ayina	(England) Huddersfield Town	Free	
1 July 2025 (Note: The transfer was announced on 9 June, and would become official on July 1 once his contract at Barnet had expired)	CB	(Nigeria) Adebola Oluwo	(England) Barnet	Free	
2 July 2025	CB	(England) Luca Jackson	(England) Burnley	Free	
10 July 2025	CAM	(England) Jorge Grant	(Scotland) Heart of Midlothian	Free	
22 July 2025	GK	(England) Mark Howard	(Wales) Wrexham	Free	
24 July 2025	RW	(England) Kadeem Harris	(England) Carlisle United	Free	
8 August 2025	RB	(England) Ollie Turton	(England) Huddersfield Town	Free	
21 August 2025	CB	(Scotland) Michael Rose	(England) Stoke City	Free	
22 August 2025	CDM	(England) Matt Butcher	(England) Wycombe Wanderers	Free transfer	
26 August 2025	CB	(Wales) Brandon Cooper	(England) Leyton Orient	Free transfer	
1 September 2025	CF	(Nigeria) Daniel Udoh	(England) Wycombe Wanderers	£325,000	
1 October 2025	GK	(England) Mackenzie Chapman	(England) Blackpool	Free	
17 October 2025	LW	(Italy) Fabio Borini	(Italy) Sampdoria	Free	
7 January 2026	CB	(England) Zach Awe	(England) Southampton	Undisclosed	
9 January 2026	CF	(Republic of Ireland) Ryan Graydon	(England) Fleetwood Town	£400,000 (Note: Rising to £600,000 with potential add-ons)	

=== Out ===
Date	Pos.	Player	To	Fee	Ref.
25 June 2025	RW	(Democratic Republic of the Congo) Junior Luamba	(England) Carlisle United	Undisclosed	
4 August 2025	CF	(England) Will Wright	(England) Liverpool	£200,000	
23 January 2026	RB	(Republic of Ireland) Tosin Olopade	(England) Spalding United	Undisclosed	
2 February 2026	LB	(England) Kevin Berkoe	(England) Shrewsbury Town	Undisclosed	

Income: ▲£200,000

=== Loaned in ===
Date	Pos.	Player	From	Date until	Ref.
24 July 2025	GK	(England) Matt Young	(England) Sunderland	31 May 2026	
29 August 2025	CF	(Uruguay) Nicolás Siri	(Uruguay) Montevideo City Torque	31 May 2026	
2 February 2026	CB	(England) Alfie Dorrington	(England) Tottenham Hotspur	31 May 2026	
2 February 2026	CF	(England) Princewill Ehibhatiomhan	(England) Southampton	31 May 2026	

=== Loaned out ===
Date	Pos.	Player	To	Date until	Ref.
10 July 2025	CF	(Canada) Robbie Cleary	(Republic of Ireland) Kerry	31 December 2025	
13 September 2025	LB	(England) Kevin Berkoe	(England) Rochdale	20 November 2025 (Note: On 20 November, Berkoe was recalled from his loan at Rochdale)	
6 November 2025	CF	(England) Harry Showman	(England) Atherton Collieries	11 February 2026 (Note: On 14 January, Showman's loan at Atherton Collieries was extended for a further month)	
11 November 2025	GK	(England) Mackenzie Chapman	(England) St Albans City	9 December 2025	
12 November 2025	RB	(Republic of Ireland) Tosin Olopade	(England) Spalding United	10 December 2025	
2 December 2025	CM	(England) Brad Mundy	(England) Trafford	11 January 2026	
5 December 2025	CM	(Australia) Jai Curran-Nicholls	(England) Marine	4 January 2026	
14 January 2026	GK	(England) Mackenzie Chapman	(England) Hyde United	11 February 2026	
14 January 2026	CM	(England) Alfie Henderson	(England) Morpeth Town	11 February 2026	
11 March 2026	CB	(England) Hayden Carson	(England) Chester	31 May 2026	
11 March 2026	RB	(England) Luca Jackson	(England) Atherton Collieries	31 May 2026	
17 April 2026	GK	(England) Mackenzie Chapman	(England) Peterborough Sports	24 April 2026	

=== Released / Out of Contract ===
Date	Pos.	Player	Subsequent club	Join date	Ref.
30 June 2025	CF	(Wales) Marcus Dackers	(Scotland) Kilmarnock	1 July 2025	
30 June 2025	CM	(England) Liam Humbles	(England) Rochdale	1 July 2025	
30 June 2025	RM	(England) Jon Taylor	(England) Radcliffe	1 July 2025	
30 June 2025	CB	(Jamaica) Curtis Tilt	(England) Bradford City	1 July 2025	
30 June 2025	RW	(Republic of Ireland) Sandro Da Costa	(England) Wythenshawe	25 July 2025	
30 June 2025	CM	(England) Jacob Hamman	(England) Witton Albion	29 July 2025	
30 June 2025	RB	(Wales) Liam Shephard	(Wales) Newport County	6 August 2025	
30 June 2025	LM	(England) Ben Collins	(England) Southport	7 August 2025	
30 June 2025	CF	(England) Conor McAleny	(England) Harrogate Town	8 August 2025	
30 June 2025	CM	(England) Jez Davies	(England) Peterborough Sports	20 September 2025	
30 June 2025	CF	(England) Callum Morton	(England) Bristol Rovers	28 November 2025	
30 June 2025	GK	(England) James Carr	(England) Darlaston Town 1874	8 March 2026	
30 June 2025	CDM	(England) Ryan Watson	(England) Tranmere Rovers	26 March 2026	
30 June 2025	CM	(Northern Ireland) Matty Lund	Retired		

=== New contract ===
Date	Pos.	Player	Contracted until	Ref.
31 May 2025	CM	(England) Alfie Bairstow	Undisclosed (Note: First professional contract)	
31 May 2025	LB	(England) Ruben Butt	Undisclosed	
31 May 2025	CM	(England) Bruno Padovani	Undisclosed	
27 January 2026	CF	(Italy) Fabio Borini	30 June 2026	
4 February 2026	LB	(England) Luke Garbutt	30 June 2027	

== Pre-season and friendlies ==
On 23 May, Salford City announced they would begin pre-season with a fixture against Witton Albion. Three weeks later, three further friendlies were confirmed against Curzon Ashton, Chester and Ashton United. Two home friendlies were next added, against Blackpool and Stockport County. On 13 June, the club announced their full pre-season schedule with the addition off FC United of Manchester and York City added. A replacement friendly for the cancelled fixture was confirmed to be against Warrington Rylands.

Win Draw Loss Fixtures

5 July 2025 Friendly	Witton Albion	2–3	Salford City	Wincham
15:00 BST	Duckworth 19'; Hoyle 44'	Report	Woodburn 34'; Curran-Nicholls 47'; Butt 87'	Stadium: Wincham Park

8 July 2025 Friendly	FC United of Manchester	2–2	Salford City	Moston
19:00 BST	Buckley 35'; Sidibe 79'	Report	Wright 47', 60'	Stadium: Broadhurst Park

9 July 2025 Friendly	Ashton United	2–2	Salford City	Ashton-under-Lyne
19:00 BST	Trialist 38' (pen.); Osei 55'	Report	Curran-Nicholls 50'; Wright 65'	Stadium: Hurst Cross

11 July 2025 Friendly	York City	3–3	Salford City	Huntington
19:00 BST	Pearce 4', 21'; Fadera 76'	Report	Wright 35'; Edwards 69'; Austerfield 73'	Stadium: York Community Stadium

15 July 2025 Friendly	Warrington Rylands	3–5	Salford City	Warrington
19:00 BST	Hardcastle 58'; Trialist 63'; Smith 79'	Report	Wilson 3'; Butt 45+2' (pen.), 64'; Ayina 54'; Showman 83'	Stadium: Gorsey Lane

15 July 2025 Friendly	Curzon Ashton	Cancelled	Salford City	Ashton-under-Lyne
19:45 BST				Stadium: Tameside Stadium
Note: On 20 June, the fixture was cancelled due to ongoing works at the Tameside Stadium.

19 July 2025 Friendly	Chester	0–3	Salford City	Chester
15:00 BST		Report	Woodburn 23'; Bird 27'; Leak 80' (o.g.)	Stadium: Deva Stadium

22 July 2025 Friendly	Salford City	0–0	Blackpool	Kersal
19:00 BST		Report		Stadium: Moor Lane

25 July 2025 Friendly	Salford City	1–1	Stockport County	Kersal
19:30 BST	Ashley 83'	Report	Trialist 53'	Stadium: Moor Lane

== Competitions ==
=== League Two ===
==== League table ====
Pos	Team	Pld	W	D	L	GF	GA	GD	Pts	Promotion, qualification or relegation
2	Milton Keynes Dons (P)	46	24	14	8	86	45	+41	86	Promotion to EFL League One
3	Cambridge United (P)	46	22	16	8	66	33	+33	82	Promotion to EFL League One
4	Salford City	46	25	6	15	61	51	+10	81	Qualification for League Two play-offs
5	Notts County (O, P)	46	24	8	14	74	52	+22	80	Qualification for League Two play-offs
6	Chesterfield	46	21	16	9	71	56	+15	79	Qualification for League Two play-offs

Source: EFL Official Website
Rules for classification: 1) Points; 2) Goal difference; 3) Number of goals scored; 4) Head-to-head results; 5) Wins; 6) Away goals; 7) Penalty points (sec 9.5); 8) 12-point sending off offences
(O) Play-off winners; (P) Promoted

==== Results summary ====
Overall								Home						Away					
Pld	W	D	L	GF	GA	GD	Pts	W	D	L	GF	GA	GD	W	D	L	GF	GA	GD
46	25	6	15	61	51	+10	81	14	4	5	34	24	+10	11	2	10	27	27	0

Last updated: complete.
Source: Soccerway

==== Results by round ====
Round	1	2	3	4	5	6	7	8	9	10	11	12	13	14	15	16	17	18	19	20	21	22	23	24	27	28	29	30	31	33	34	25^{1}	35	26^{2}	36	32^{3}	37	38	39	40	41	42	43	44	45	46
Ground	H	A	H	A	A	H	H	A	H	A	H	A	H	A	H	A	A	H	A	H	A	H	H	A	A	H	H	A	A	H	A	H	A	A	H	H	A	H	A	H	H	A	H	A	H	A
Result	L	W	W	W	L	D	W	W	W	L	L	L	W	W	D	L	L	W	D	W	W	W	D	W	W	W	L	W	L	L	L	L	W	L	W	W	W	W	L	W	W	L	D	W	W	D
Position	22	14	8	4	9	11	8	3	2	4	5	9	7	3	3	9	12	7	7	6	6	5	5	4	4	2	4	3	5	7	7	8	7	9	6	6	5	5	6	6	5	6	6	4	4	4
Points	0	3	6	9	9	10	13	16	19	19	19	19	22	25	26	26	26	29	30	33	36	39	40	43	46	49	49	52	52	52	52	52	55	55	58	61	64	67	67	70	73	73	74	77	80	81

Source: EFL
A = Away; H = Home; W = Win; D = Draw; L = Loss; P = Postponed
Notes:
- ^{1} Matchday 25 (vs. Shrewsbury Town) was postponed due to a frozen pitch.
- ^{2} Matchday 26 (vs. Grimsby Town) was postponed due FA Cup involvements.
- ^{3} Matchday 32 (vs. Walsall) was postponed due FA Cup involvements.

==== Matches ====
On 26 June, the League Two fixtures were announced.

Win Draw Loss Fixtures

2 August 2025 1	Salford City	1–3	Crewe Alexandra	Kersal
15:00 BST	Woodburn (penalty missed) 5'; Harris 16'; Edwards (yellow card) 34'; Grant (yellow card) 45+3'; Cesay (yellow card) 69'; Ayina (yellow card) 81'	Report	Harris 8' (o.g.); Connolly (yellow card) 38'; Thomas 41', 45+4'; O'Reilly (yellow card) 66'	Stadium: Moor Lane; Attendance: 3,994; Referee: Neil Hair

9 August 2025 2	Notts County	1–2	Salford City	Nottingham
12:30 BST	Platt (yellow card) 40'; Bedeau (yellow card) 55'; Luker 71'; Jones (yellow card) 90+2'	Report	Olowu 35'; Harris (yellow card) 43'; N'Mai 58', (yellow card) 59'; Austerfield (yellow card) 82'	Stadium: Meadow Lane; Attendance: 9,074; Referee: Aaron Bannister
Note: Fixture was originally scheduled for a 15:00 kick-off, but was moved live Sky Sports broadcasting.

16 August 2025 3	Salford City	2–1	Accrington Stanley	Kersal
15:00 BST	Woodburn 23'; Garbutt 27', (yellow card) 43'	Report	Walton (yellow card) 54', (goal) 85' (pen.)	Stadium: Moor Lane; Attendance: 2,943; Referee: Matthew Corlett

19 August 2025 4	Newport County	0–1	Salford City	Newport
19:45 BST	Smith (yellow card) 90+3'	Report	Oluwo 51', (yellow card) 80'; Harris (yellow card) 53'; Bird (yellow card) 83'	Stadium: Rodney Parade; Attendance: 3,528; Referee: James Durkin

23 August 2025 5	Walsall	1–0	Salford City	Bescot
12:30 BST	Burke 32'; Harper (yellow card) 37'; Comley (yellow card) 90+3'	Report	Longelo (yellow card) 90+3'	Stadium: Bescot Stadium; Attendance: 5,490; Referee: James Oldham
Note: Fixture was originally scheduled for a 15:00 kick-off, but was moved live Sky Sports broadcasting.

29 August 2025 6	Salford City	1–1	Cheltenham Town	Kersal
19:45 BST	Harris 90+3'		Miller 56'	Stadium: Moor Lane; Attendance: 2,436; Referee: Alex Chilowicz
Note: Fixture was originally scheduled for 30 August, but was moved to the night prior.

6 September 2025 7	Salford City	3–1	Tranmere Rovers	Salford
15:00 BST	Mnoga (yellow card) 48'; Garbutt 56' (pen.); Stockton 81'; Ashley 86'	Report	Patrick 64'	Stadium: Peninsula Stadium; Attendance: 3,628; Referee: Andrew Humphries

13 September 2025 8	Shrewsbury Town	1–3	Salford City	Shrewsbury
15:00 BST	Clucas 47'; Harrison (yellow card) 71'	Report	Mnoga (yellow card) 1'; Udoh 28', 90+2'; Cooper (yellow card) 59'; Woodburn 82'	Stadium: New Meadow; Attendance: 5,054; Referee: Peter Wright

20 September 2025 9	Salford City	3–2	Swindon Town	Kersal
15:00 BST	Grant 4'; Harris 15'; Mnoga (yellow card) 78'; Cesay 90+1'	Report	Munroe (yellow card) 32'; Drinan 54'; Snowdon (yellow card) 61'; Knight-Lebel 83'	Stadium: Moor Lane; Referee: Ross Martin

27 September 2025 10	Bristol Rovers	2–1	Salford City	Horfield
15:00 BST	Harrison 45+2'; Mola (yellow card) 61'; Cavegn 63'; Thomas (yellow card) 90+7'	Report	Butcher 11'; Harris (yellow card) 40'; Garbutt (yellow card) 54', (penalty missed) 90+7'; Ashley (yellow card) 57'; Mnoga (yellow card) 74', (red card) 90+6'	Stadium: Memorial Stadium; Attendance: 7,601; Referee: Gareth Rhodes

4 October 2025 11	Salford City	0–2	Grimsby Town	Kersal
15:00 BST	Ashley (yellow card) 40'; Butcher (yellow card) 45'; Cooper (yellow card) 63'	Report	Khouri 1'; McJannet (yellow card) 19'; Vernam 31'; Rose (yellow card) 82'; Warren (yellow card) 90+1'	Stadium: Moor Lane; Attendance: 3,608; Referee: Stephen Parkinson

11 October 2025 12	Chesterfield	2–0	Salford City	Chesterfield
15:00 BST	Naylor (yellow card) 3'; Turton 62' (o.g.); Darcy 83'; Daley-Campbell (yellow card) 90+2'; McFadzean (yellow card) 90+2'	Report	Turton (yellow card) 29'; Woodburn (yellow card) 82'	Stadium: SMH Group Stadium; Attendance: 7,962; Referee: Oliver Mackey

18 October 2025 13	Salford City	1–0	Oldham Athletic	Salford, Lancs.
12:30 BST	Harris (penalty missed) 14'; Udoh 14'; Mnoga (yellow card) 45+5'; Ashley (yellow card) 45+8'; Longelo (yellow card) 84'	Report	Monthé (yellow card) 13'; Sutton (red card) 64'; Caprice (yellow card) 74'	Stadium: Moor Lane; Attendance: 4,006 (1,360 away); Referee: Jacob Miles
Note: Fixture was originally scheduled for a 15:00 kick-off, but was rescheduled for live Sky Sports broadcasting.

25 October 2025 14	Gillingham	1–2	Salford City	Gillingham
15:00 BST	Dack (penalty missed) 23', (yellow card) 57'; Andrews 36'; Coleman (yellow card) 66'	Report	Udoh 7', (yellow card) 56'; Cesay 27'; Woodburn (yellow card) 58'; Garbutt (yellow card) 72'; N'Mai (yellow card) 73'; Oluwo (yellow card) 85'	Stadium: Priestfield Stadium; Attendance: 6,174; Referee: David Rock

8 November 2025 15	Salford City	0–0	Cambridge United	Kersal
15:00 GMT	Garbutt (yellow card) 5'; Udoh (yellow card) 55'; N'Mai (yellow card) 70'; Borini (yellow card) 82'	Report	Bennett (yellow card) 15'; Mayor (yellow card) 90+2'	Stadium: Moor Lane; Referee: Oliver Yates

15 November 2025 16	Milton Keynes Dons	2–0	Salford City	Denbigh
15:00 GMT	Mendez-Laing 45+2' (pen.); Sanders (yellow card) 70'; Paterson (yellow card) 90+2', (goal) 90+4'	Report	Oluwo (yellow card) 90+5'	Stadium: Stadium MK; Attendance: 8,309; Referee: Ross Joyce

22 November 2025 17	Bromley	2–0	Salford City	Bromley
15:00 GMT	Sowunmi 24'; Hondermarck 32'	Report	Grant (yellow card) 45'; Butcher (yellow card) 78'	Stadium: Hayes Lane; Attendance: 3,771; Referee: Matthew Russell

29 November 2025 18	Salford City	4–3	Crawley Town	Kersal
15:00 GMT	Oluwo 45+1', (yellow card) 55'; Butcher 53'; Austerfield 85'; Cesay 86'	Report	Watson (yellow card) 9'; Williams 33', 72'; McKirdy (penalty missed) 47'; Tshimanga (yellow card) 53'; Forster 57'	Stadium: Moor Lane; Attendance: 2,127; Referee: Martin Coy

9 December 2025 19	Fleetwood Town	1–1	Salford City	Fleetwood
19:45 GMT	Neal (yellow card) 21'; Hughes (yellow card) 67'; Virtue 82'	Report	N'Mai 26', (yellow card) 44'	Stadium: Highbury Stadium; Attendance: 2,353; Referee: Seb Stockbridge

13 December 2025 20	Salford City	4–3	Colchester United	Kersal
12:30 GMT	Mnoga (yellow card) 9'; Harris 11'; Oluwo 59'; Borini 75' (pen.); Garbutt 90+2', (yellow card) 90+3'; Cesay (yellow card) 90+7'	Report	Anderson 8'; Iandolo 51'; Read 55'	Stadium: Moor Lane; Attendance: 2,536; Referee: Scott Oldham
Note: Fixture was originally scheduled for a 15:00 kick-off, but was rescheduled for live Sky Sports broadcasting.

20 December 2025 21	Barnet	1–3	Salford City	Edgware
15:00 GMT	Hawkins 89'	Report	Austerfield 34'; Ofoborh 39' (o.g.); Udoh 56'; N'Mai (yellow card) 73'; Borini (yellow card) 90+4'	Stadium: The Hive Stadium; Attendance: 2,220; Referee: Aaron Farmer

26 December 2025 22	Salford City	1–0	Harrogate Town	Kersal
15:00 GMT	Longelo (yellow card) 55'; Udoh 75' (pen.)	Report	O'Connor (yellow card) 32'	Stadium: Moor Lane; Attendance: 2,911; Referee: Jamie O'Connor

29 December 2025 23	Salford City	0–0	Fleetwood Town	Kersal
19:45 GMT	Oluwo (yellow card) 5'; Cooper (yellow card) 58'	Report	Hughes (yellow card) 27'; Potter (yellow card) 81'	Stadium: Moor Lane; Attendance: 2,851; Referee: Martin Woods

1 January 2026 24	Barrow	1–2	Salford City	Barrow-in-Furness
15:00 GMT	Fletcher 20'; Williams (yellow card) 57'; Raglan (yellow card) 80'	Report	Udoh 11'; Oluwo (yellow card) 15'; N'Mai 83'	Stadium: Holker Street; Attendance: 2,752; Referee: Adam Herczeg

17 January 2026 27	Swindon Town	2–3	Salford City	Swindon
15:00 GMT	McGregor 35'; Snowdon (yellow card) 56'; Drinan 77'; Wright (yellow card) 87'	Report	Turton 24'; N'Mai 31'; Austerfield (yellow card) 39'; Cooper (yellow card) 65'; Garbutt (yellow card) 67'; Cesay 72'; Woodburn (yellow card) 73'	Stadium: County Ground; Attendance: 8,129; Referee: Charles Breakspear

24 January 2026 28	Salford City	1–0	Bristol Rovers	Kersal
15:00 GMT	Graydon 8'; Garbutt (yellow card) 29'; Mnoga (yellow card) 43'	Report		Stadium: Moor Lane; Referee: Simon Mather

27 January 2026 29	Salford City	0–1	Chesterfield	Kersal
19:45 GMT	Mnoga (yellow card) 63'; Graydon (yellow card) 88'	Report	Stirk (yellow card) 82'; Cooper 90+3' (o.g.)	Stadium: Moor Lane; Attendance: 2,630; Referee: Oliver Yates

31 January 2026 30	Tranmere Rovers	0–2	Salford City	Birkenhead
15:00 GMT	Finley (yellow card) 81'; Dennis (yellow card) 90+5'	Report	Grant 68'; N'Mai 75'	Stadium: Prenton Park; Attendance: 6,203; Referee: Richard Eley

5 February 2026 31	Accrington Stanley	1–0	Salford City	Accrington
20:00 GMT	Henderson 4'; O'Brien (yellow card) 64'	Report	Grant (yellow card) 13'	Stadium: Crown Ground; Attendance: 1,892; Referee: Darren Drysdale
Note: Fixture was initially scheduled for 7 February, but was rescheduled for live Sky Sports broadcasting.

17 February 2026 33	Salford City	1–3	Newport County	Kersal
19:45 GMT	N'Mai (yellow card) 71'; Grant (yellow card) 76'; Graydon (yellow card) 87'; Woodburn (yellow card) 90+1', (goal) 90+4'	Report	Delaney 13'; Evans (yellow card) 29'; Baker-Richardson (yellow card) 52'; Lloyd 56'; Opoku 59', (yellow card) 90+7'; Biggins (yellow card) 62'; Sprangler (yellow card) 69'	Stadium: Moor Lane; Attendance: 2,236; Referee: David Rock

21 February 2026 34	Cheltenham Town	3–2	Salford City	Cheltenham
15:00 GMT	Hutchinson 51' (pen.), (yellow card) 73'; Ashfield 84'; Miller 90+6'	Report	Grant 6'; Harris (yellow card) 14'; Garbutt (red card) 48'; Woodburn (yellow card) 49'; Young (yellow card) 71'; Graydon (yellow card) 73'; Ashley (yellow card) 73'; Awe 76'	Stadium: Whaddon Road; Attendance: 3,523; Referee: Abigail Byrne

24 February 2026 25	Salford City	1–2	Shrewsbury Town	Kersal
19:45 GMT	Hoole 45+2' (o.g.); N'Mai (yellow card) 87'	Report	Sang 51'; Boyle 76'; Benning (yellow card) 90+4'	Stadium: Moor Lane; Attendance: 2,504; Referee: Andrew Humphries
Note: Fixture was originally scheduled for 4 January, but it was postponed due to a frozen pitch.

28 February 2026 35	Colchester United	0–1	Salford City	Colchester
15:00 GMT	Goodwin (yellow card) 37'; Read (yellow card) 41'; Back (yellow card) 43'	Report	Longelo (yellow card) 31'; Stockton 78'; Austerfield (yellow card) 87'	Stadium: Colchester Community Stadium; Attendance: 3,674; Referee: Ross Martin

3 March 2026 26	Grimsby Town	3–1	Salford City	Cleethorpes
19:45 GMT	Green 33'; Vernam 39'; Soonsup-Bell 42'; Walker (yellow card) 90+5'; Kacurri (yellow card) 90+6'	Report	Ashley (yellow card) 50'; Stockton 53', (yellow card) 61'; Austerfield (yellow card) 59'; Grant (yellow card) 90'	Stadium: Blundell Park; Attendance: 5,154; Referee: Ross Joyce
Note: Fixture was originally scheduled for 10 January, but it was postponed due to FA Cup involvements.

7 March 2026 36	Salford City	2–0	Barnet	Kersal
12:30 GMT	Mnoga (yellow card) 28'; Longelo 39'; Butcher 45'; Grant (yellow card) 90+3'	Report		Stadium: Moor Lane; Attendance: 2,537; Referee: Bobby Madley
Note: Fixture was originally scheduled for a 15:00 kick-off, but was brought forward for live Sky Sports broadcasting.

10 March 2026 32	Salford City	1–0	Walsall	Kersal
19:45 GMT	Mnoga (yellow card) 56'; Borini 74'	Report	Flint (yellow card) 38'	Stadium: Moor Lane; Attendance: 2,011; Referee: Martin Woods
Note: Fixture was rearranged due to the progression in the FA Cup.

14 March 2026 37	Harrogate Town	0–1	Salford City	Harrogate
12:30 GMT		Report	Borini (yellow card) 84'; Udoh 85'; Turton (yellow card) 90'	Stadium: Wetherby Road; Attendance: 2,861; Referee: James Linington
Note: Fixture was initially scheduled for a 15:00 kick-off, but was brought forward for Sky Sports broadcasting.

17 March 2026 38	Salford City	3–1	Barrow	Kersal
19:45 GMT	Graydon 20'; Borini 69', 83'; Butcher (yellow card) 86'	Report	Gordon (yellow card) 52'; Rose 77'	Stadium: Moor Lane; Referee: Isaac Searle

21 March 2026 39	Cambridge United	1–0	Salford City	Cambridge
12:30 GMT	Gibbons 49', (yellow card) 83'; Mpanzu (yellow card) 71'	Report	Mnoga (yellow card) 22'; Grant (yellow card) 62'; Borini (yellow card) 81'; Graydon (yellow card) 83'	Stadium: Abbey Stadium; Attendance: 6,633; Referee: Alan Dale
Note: Fixture was initially scheduled for a 15:00 kick-off, but was brought forward for Sky Sports broadcasting.

28 March 2026 40	Salford City	1–0	Milton Keynes Dons	Kersal
15:00 GMT	Butcher 66'; Graydon (yellow card) 86'	Report	Offord (red card) 85'; Mellish (yellow card) 86'; Gilbey (yellow card) 90+2'	Stadium: Moor Lane; Attendance: 3,177; Referee: Thomas Parsons

3 April 2026 41	Salford City	2–1	Notts County	Kersal
15:00 BST	Graydon (yellow card) 62', (goal) 90+2'; Butcher 90+6'	Report	Hall (yellow card) 90+2'; Browne 90+5'	Stadium: Moor Lane; Attendance: 4,011; Referee: Seb Stockbridge

6 April 2026 42	Crewe Alexandra	1–0	Salford City	Crewe
15:00 BST	Tezgel 14'; Pond (yellow card) 90+6'	Report	Grant (yellow card) 90+7'	Stadium: Gresty Road; Attendance: 5,703; Referee: Paul Howard

11 April 2026 43	Salford City	0–0	Gillingham	Kersal
15:00 BST	Oluwo (yellow card) 75'	Report	Khumbeni (yellow card) 59'; Hale (yellow card) 75'	Stadium: Moor Lane; Attendance: 4,303; Referee: Stephen Parkinson

18 April 2026 44	Oldham Athletic	1–2	Salford City	Oldham
15:00 BST	Woods (yellow card) 3'; Hawkes 61'; Garner (yellow card) 63'; Fondop (yellow card) 75'	Report	Oluwo 4'; Udoh 45+3'; Mnoga (yellow card) 83'; Graydon (yellow card) 90'	Stadium: Boundary Park; Attendance: 8,968; Referee: Will Finnie

23 April 2026 45	Salford City	2–0	Bromley	Kersal
20:00 BST	Turton (yellow card) 12', (goal) 76'; Grant 52'; Young (yellow card) 90+8'	Report	Webster (yellow card) 39'	Stadium: Moor Lane; Referee: Andrew Humphries
Note: Fixture was initially scheduled for 25 April, but was brought forward to the Thursday for Sky Sports broadcasting.

2 May 2026 46	Crawley Town	0–0	Salford City	Crawley
15:00 BST	Barker (yellow card) 18'	Report		Stadium: Broadfield Stadium; Attendance: 5,191; Referee: Lee Swabey

==== Play-offs ====
Salford finished 4th in the regular season and were drawn against 7th place Grimsby Town, first leg away and then home in the second leg.

10 May 2026 Semi-final (first leg)	Grimsby Town	1–2	Salford City	Cleethorpes
15:00 BST	Staunton 1'; Turi (yellow card) 58'	Report	Cesay 4'; Garbutt (yellow card) 19'; Oluwo 40'; Austerfield (yellow card) 58'; Butcher (yellow card) 63'	Stadium: Blundell Park; Referee: Matthew Corlett

15 May 2026 Semi-final (second leg)	Salford City	2–2 (a.e.t.) (4–3 agg.)	Grimsby Town	Kersal
19:15 BST	Udoh 53'; Cesay 117'	Report	Vernam (yellow card) 70'; Green 74', (yellow card) 92'; Kabia 78'	Stadium: Moor Lane; Referee: Ben Speedie

25 May 2026 Final	Notts County	3–0	Salford City	Wembley, London
15:00 BST	Tsaroulla (yellow card) 22'; Jatta 32'; Ness 45', (yellow card) 57'; Jones 70'		Mnoga (yellow card) 44'; Woodburn (yellow card) 90+3'	Stadium: Wembley Stadium; Attendance: 30,851; Referee: Tom Reeves

=== FA Cup ===
Salford were drawn at home to Lincoln City in the first round, home to Leyton Orient in the second round, home to Swindon Town in the third round and away to Manchester City in the fourth round.

Win Draw Loss Fixtures

1 November 2025 First round	Salford City	1–1 (a.e.t.) (4–2 p)	Lincoln City	Kersal
15:00 GMT	Stockton (yellow card) 13'; Cesay (yellow card) 39'; Butcher (yellow card) 60'; Borini (yellow card) 72'; N'Mai 93'	Report	Ring 26'; Reach (yellow card) 33'; Towler (yellow card) 79'; Wickens (yellow card) 90+1'; Darikwa (yellow card) 110' (yellow-red card) 116'	Stadium: Moor Lane; Referee: Steven Copeland
	Penalties
	Borini (penalty scored); Garbutt (penalty scored); Woodburn (penalty scored); Udoh (penalty scored)		Street (penalty scored); Bayliss (penalty missed); Obikwu (penalty scored); McGrandles (penalty missed)

5 December 2025 Second round	Salford City	4–0	Leyton Orient	Kersal
19:30 GMT	Cahill 23' (o.g.); Cesay 61', (yellow card) 90+3'; Borini 87'; N'Mai 90+1'; Mnoga (yellow card) 90+5'	Report	Clare (yellow card) 53'; Bakinson (yellow card) 90+3'	Stadium: Moor Lane; Attendance: 1,796; Referee: Benjamin Speedie

20 January 2026 Third round	Salford City	3–2	Swindon Town	Kersal
19:45 GMT	Graydon 11', 52'; Woodburn (yellow card) 55'; Garbutt 68'	Report	Kirkman (yellow card) 34'; Palmer 55'; McGregor (yellow card) 58'; Ball 60'	Stadium: Moor Lane; Attendance: 2,215; Referee: Alex Chilowicz
Note: Fixture was initially scheduled for 10 January, but it was rearranged due to a frozen pitch.

14 February 2026 Fourth round	Manchester City	2–0	Salford City	Manchester
15:00 GMT	Dorrington 6' (o.g.); Guéhi 81'	Report	N'Mai (yellow card) 3'; Longelo (yellow card) 80'	Stadium: City of Manchester Stadium; Attendance: 46,774; Referee: Matthew Donohue

=== EFL Cup ===
Win Draw Loss Fixtures

12 August 2025 First round	Salford City	0–0 (2–3 p)	Rotherham United	Kersal
19:45 BST	Cesay (yellow card) 83'; Woodburn (yellow card) 90+5'	Report	Yearwood (yellow card) 37'	Stadium: Moor Lane; Attendance: 1,409; Referee: Edward Duckworth
	Penalties
	Edwards (penalty missed); Garbutt (penalty scored); Woodburn (penalty scored); Grant (penalty missed); N'Mai (penalty missed)		(penalty scored) Powell; (penalty scored) Holmes; (penalty missed) Gore; (penalty scored) Hall

=== EFL Trophy ===
Salford were drawn against Stockport County, Wigan Athletic and Wolverhampton Wanderers U21 in the group stage. After winning the group, City were drawn at home to Rotherham United in the round of 32.

Pos	Div	Team	Pld	W	PW	PL	L	GF	GA	GD	Pts	Qualification
1	L2	Salford City	3	3	0	0	0	9	3	+6	9	Advance to Round 2
2	L1	Stockport County	3	1	1	0	1	7	7	0	5	Advance to Round 2
3	ACA	Wolverhampton Wanderers U21	3	1	0	0	2	7	10	−3	3	
4	L1	Wigan Athletic	3	0	0	1	2	2	5	−3	1	

Source: EFL

Win Draw Loss Fixtures

2 September 2025 North Group A	Wigan Athletic	0–2	Salford City	Wigan
19:00 BST	Graham (yellow card) 29' Greenhalgh (yellow card) 90+2'	Report	Turton 50'; Bird (yellow card) 67'; Stockton 81'	Stadium: Brick Community Stadium; Attendance: TBA; Referee: Richard Eley

7 October 2025 North Group A	Salford City	3–1	Stockport County	Kersal
19:00 BST	Austerfield 34'; Bird 55' (pen.); Cesay 70'		Bailey 85'	Stadium: Moor Lane; Attendance: 1,429; Referee: Jamie O'Connor

11 November 2025 North Group A	Salford City	4–2	Wolverhampton Wanderers U21	Kersal
19:00 GMT	Padovani 40'; Stockton 59'; Curran-Nicholls (yellow card) 64'; Butt 77', 82'	Report	Holman 9'; Voice (yellow card) 11'; Olagunju (yellow card) 25'; Pond (yellow card) 74'; Lopes 90+2'	Stadium: Moor Lane; Referee: Andrew Miller

2 December 2025 Round of 32	Salford City	2–7	Rotherham United	Kersal
19:00 GMT	Siri 8'; Stockton 31'	Report	Ayres 18'; Clarke 22'; Benson 39', 53', 55', (yellow card) 62'; Kelly (yellow card) 79'; Gore 85'; Gardner 89'	Stadium: Moor Lane; Attendance: 519; Referee: Darren Drysdale

== Statistics ==
=== Appearances and goals ===
As of match played 25 May 2026

Players with no appearances are not included on the list; italics indicate loaned in player

No.	Pos	Nat	Player	Total		League Two		FA Cup		EFL Cup		EFL Trophy		League Two play-offs	
No.	Pos	Nat	Player	Apps	Goals	Apps	Goals	Apps	Goals	Apps	Goals	Apps	Goals	Apps	Goals
1	GK	(England) ENG	Matty Young	50	0	44+0	0	3+0	0	0+0	0	0+0	0	3+0	0
2	DF	(Republic of the Congo) CGO	Loick Ayina	3	0	0+1	0	0+0	0	0+0	0	0+2	0	0+0	0
3	DF	(England) ENG	Kevin Berkoe	9	0	0+6	0	1+0	0	0+0	0	2+0	0	0+0	0
4	MF	(England) ENG	Ossama Ashley	19	1	8+10	1	0+1	0	0+0	0	0+0	0	0+0	0
5	DF	(Scotland) SCO	Michael Rose	4	0	3+0	0	0+0	0	0+0	0	1+0	0	0+0	0
6	DF	(England) ENG	Ollie Turton	47	3	33+6	2	3+1	0	0+1	0	3+0	1	0+0	0
7	MF	(Wales) WAL	Ben Woodburn	33	3	14+10	3	2+1	0	1+0	0	2+0	0	0+3	0
8	MF	(England) ENG	Jorge Grant	48	4	38+3	4	3+1	0	0+1	0	1+1	0	0+0	0
9	FW	(England) ENG	Cole Stockton	36	6	17+12	3	1+0	0	0+0	0	2+1	3	0+3	0
10	MF	(Netherlands) NED	Kelly N'Mai	33	7	22+4	5	4+0	2	0+1	0	0+0	0	2+0	0
11	FW	(England) ENG	Jay Bird	11	1	3+5	0	0+0	0	1+0	0	2+0	1	0+0	0
12	DF	(England) ENG	Tom Edwards	8	0	1+4	0	0+0	0	1+0	0	2+0	0	0+0	0
14	FW	(England) ENG	Kadeem Harris	27	4	21+1	4	1+1	0	1+0	0	0+0	0	0+2	0
15	DF	(Wales) WAL	Brandon Cooper	44	0	28+7	0	2+1	0	0+0	0	3+0	0	3+0	0
16	FW	(Italy) ITA	Fabio Borini	33	5	1+25	4	0+2	1	0+0	0	1+1	0	0+3	0
17	MF	(England) ENG	Josh Austerfield	50	3	30+8	2	3+1	0	1+0	0	4+0	1	3+0	0
18	MF	(England) ENG	Matt Butcher	48	5	26+12	5	2+2	0	0+0	0	2+1	0	3+0	0
19	DF	(Tanzania) TAN	Haji Mnoga	33	0	20+5	0	3+0	0	0+0	0	0+2	0	3+0	0
21	DF	(Sierra Leone) SLE	Kallum Cesay	37	8	26+2	4	2+0	1	1+0	0	1+2	1	3+0	2
22	DF	(Nigeria) NGR	Adebola Oluwo	43	6	32+4	5	2+0	0	1+0	0	1+0	0	3+0	1
23	FW	(Nigeria) NGR	Daniel Udoh	42	10	30+5	9	1+3	0	0+0	0	0+0	0	3+0	1
24	DF	(England) ENG	Alfie Dorrington	12	0	5+5	0	1+0	0	0+0	0	0+0	0	0+1	0
25	FW	(England) ENG	Princewill Ehibhatiomhan	12	0	3+8	0	0+1	0	0+0	0	0+0	0	0+0	0
26	FW	(Republic of Ireland) IRL	Ryan Graydon	27	5	22+0	3	2+0	2	0+0	0	0+0	0	3+0	0
27	FW	(Uruguay) URU	Nicolás Siri	10	1	0+7	0	0+0	0	0+0	0	3+0	1	0+0	0
28	FW	(England) ENG	Zach Awe	11	1	8+2	1	1+0	0	0+0	0	0+0	0	0+0	0
29	DF	(England) ENG	Luke Garbutt	54	4	43+0	3	3+1	1	1+0	0	0+3	0	3+0	0
30	FW	(England) ENG	Kyrell Malcolm	6	0	0+3	0	0+0	0	1+0	0	2+0	0	0+0	0
32	MF	(Australia) AUS	Jai Curran-Nicholls	3	0	0+0	0	0+0	0	0+0	0	0+3	0	0+0	0
33	GK	(England) ENG	Mark Howard	8	0	2+0	0	1+0	0	1+0	0	4+0	0	0+0	0
34	MF	(England) ENG	Ruben Butt	6	2	0+2	0	0+0	0	0+1	0	2+1	2	0+0	0
35	MF	(England) ENG	Bruno Padovani	2	1	0+0	0	0+0	0	0+0	0	2+0	1	0+0	0
36	DF	(England) ENG	Jacob Lara	3	0	0+0	0	0+0	0	0+0	0	2+1	0	0+0	0
39	MF	(England) ENG	Alfie Bairstow	1	0	0+0	0	0+0	0	0+0	0	0+1	0	0+0	0
42	FW	(England) ENG	Harry Showman	1	0	0+0	0	0+0	0	0+1	0	0+0	0	0+0	0
45	DF	(England) ENG	Rosaire Longelo	47	1	26+12	1	3+1	0	1+0	0	2+0	0	1+1	0
47	FW	(England) ENG	Riley Carroll	1	0	0+0	0	0+0	0	0+0	0	0+1	0	0+0	0
