= Adebola Oluwo =

Nigerian footballer (born 1999)

Personal information
- Full name: Adebola Oluwo
- Date of birth: 19 November 1999 (age 27)
- Place of birth: Mushin, Nigeria
- Height: 1.91 m (6 ft 3 in)
- Position: Defender

Team information
- Current team: Salford City
- Number: 22

Youth career
- Bromley

Senior career*
| Years | Team | Apps | (Gls) |
| 2018–2019 | Tower Hamlets | 12 | (0) |
| 2019–2020 | Fisher | 24 | (2) |
| 2020–2023 | Chelmsford City | 74 | (5) |
| 2023–2025 | Barnet | 64 | (9) |
| 2025– | Salford City | 49 | (8) |
- * Club domestic league appearances and goals as of 13:45, 22 November 2026 (UTC)

Adebola Oluwo (born 19 November 1999) is a Nigerian professional footballer who plays as a defender for EFL League Two club Salford City.

== Career ==
Oluwo began his senior career at Essex Senior League side Tower Hamlets in the 2018–19 season, following time out of the game whilst studying economics at the University of Kent after a spell in the academy at Bromley.

Ahead of the 2019–20 season, Oluwo signed for Southern Counties East League club Fisher.

In August 2020, having impressed during pre-season, Oluwo joined National League South club Chelmsford City on a one-year deal. With his first season having been curtailed due to the COVID-19 pandemic, he signed further one-year deals in April 2021 and June 2022, the latter coming off the back of an impressive campaign that saw him named Supporters' Club Player of the Season.

In May 2023, Oluwo joined National League club Barnet. He made his debut on the opening day of the season, opening the scoring in an eventual 3–2 victory over Hartlepool United in a performance that saw him voted man of the match. He made 36 appearances and scored six goals across the 2024–25 season as Barnet were crowned National League champions.

On 9 June 2025, Oluwo joined League Two club Salford City on a two-year deal. In July 2025, he was one of several players subjected to racial abuse during a pre-season friendly against York City, the incident leading to the Salford players walking off of the pitch and abandoning the match. On 9 August 2025, in his second game for the club, Oluwo scored his first Football League goal, scoring the opener in a 2–1 win away to Notts County.

On 8 May 2026, he signed a new two-year contract.

== Personal life ==
Oluwo was born in Mushin, Nigeria and raised in Ijebu Ode, before relocating to the United Kingdom at the age of eight.

== Career statistics ==
As of match played on 21 November 2026

Appearances and goals by club, season and competition
| Club | Season | League | | | FA Cup | | EFL Cup | | Other | | Total | |
| Club | Season | Division | Apps | Goals | Apps | Goals | Apps | Goals | Apps | Goals | Apps | Goals |
|---|---|---|---|---|---|---|---|---|---|---|---|---|
| Tower Hamlets | 2018–19 | Essex Senior Football League | 12 | 0 | 0 | 0 | 0 | 0 | 0 | 0 | 12 | 0 |
| Fisher | 2019–20 | Southern Counties East Football League | 24 | 2 | 0 | 0 | 0 | 0 | 5 | 1 | 29 | 3 |
| Chelmsford City | 2020–21 | National League South | 15 | 1 | 0 | 0 | 0 | 0 | 2 | 0 | 17 | 1 |
| Chelmsford City | 2021–22 | National League South | 36 | 2 | 0 | 0 | 0 | 0 | 5 | 0 | 41 | 2 |
| Chelmsford City | 2022–23 | National League South | 23 | 2 | 0 | 0 | 0 | 0 | 4 | 1 | 27 | 3 |
| Chelmsford City | Total | | 74 | 5 | 0 | 0 | 0 | 0 | 11 | 1 | 85 | 6 |
| Barnet | 2023–24 | National League | 28 | 3 | 1 | 0 | 0 | 0 | 2 (Note: One appearance in the FA Trophy, one appearance in the play-offs) | 0 | 31 | 3 |
| Barnet | 2024–25 | National League | 36 | 6 | 1 | 0 | 0 | 0 | 0 | 0 | 37 | 6 |
| Barnet | Total | | 64 | 9 | 2 | 0 | 0 | 0 | 2 | 0 | 68 | 9 |
| Salford City | 2025–26 | League Two | 35 | 5 | 2 | 0 | 1 | 0 | 4 (Note: One appearance in the EFL Trophy, three appearances and one goal in the play-offs) | 1 | 42 | 6 |
| Salford City | 2026–27 | League Two | 14 | 3 | 1 | 0 | 1 | 0 | 1 (Note: Appearance in the EFL Trophy) | 0 | 17 | 3 |
| Salford City | Total | | 49 | 8 | 3 | 0 | 2 | 0 | 5 | 1 | 59 | 9 |
| Career total | | | 223 | 26 | 5 | 0 | 2 | 0 | 23 | 3 | 253 | 29 |
