= Kyrell =

Kyrell is a masculine given name. Notable people with the name include:

- Kyrell Lisbie (born 2003), English football left-winger
- Kyrell Malcolm (born 2007), English football forward
