= Nicolás Siri =

Uruguayan football player (born 2004)

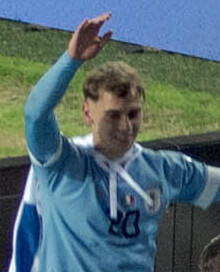
- Siri with Uruguay U20 in 2023

Personal information
- Full name: Nicolás Hernán Siri Cagno
- Date of birth: 17 April 2004 (age 22)
- Place of birth: Montevideo, Uruguay
- Height: 1.77 m (5 ft 10 in)
- Position: Forward

Team information
- Current team: Boston River
- Number: 27

Youth career
- Malvín Alto
- Danubio

Senior career*
| Years | Team | Apps | (Gls) |
| 2020–2021 | Danubio | 20 | (4) |
| 2021–2026 | Montevideo City Torque | 50 | (11) |
| 2025 | → Lommel (loan) | 10 | (2) |
| 2025–2026 | → Salford City (loan) | 7 | (0) |
| 2026– | Boston River | 16 | (3) |

International career
| 2018–2019 | Uruguay U15 | 26 | (17) |
| 2022–2023 | Uruguay U20 | 16 | (0) |
Medal record
Men's football
Representing Uruguay
FIFA U-20 World Cup
| Winner | 2023 Argentina |
South American U-20 Championship
| Runner-up | 2023 Colombia |
- * Club domestic league appearances and goals as of 19 November 2026

Nicolás Hernán Siri Cagno (born 17 April 2004) is a Uruguayan professional footballer who plays as a forward for Liga AUF Uruguaya club Boston River.

== Club career ==
=== Danubio ===
Siri is a youth academy graduate of Danubio. He made his professional debut for the club on 20 September 2020 in a 2–2 draw against Boston River. On 19 March 2021, he scored a hat-trick in a 5–1 league win against the same opponent, at the age of 16 years and 348 days in the Uruguayan first division. This made him not only the third youngest player in history to score a hat-trick in professional football, only behind Pelé and Trevor Francis, but also the youngest-ever player to score a treble in the top flight, since Pelé did it in a friendly and Francis in the English second tier. He also became the youngest South American to score a hat-trick in professional football, breaking the previous record set by Ronaldo in 1993.

=== Montevideo City Torque ===
On 27 August 2021, Siri joined Montevideo City Torque. He signed a six-year deal until June 2027.

==== Lommel and Salford City loans ====
On 27 January 2025, Siri joined Belgian club Lommel on a loan deal until the end of the season. In August 2025, he moved to English League Two club Salford City on a season long loan deal.

=== Boston River ===
On 23 July 2026, Siri joined Boston River on a two-year contract.

== International career ==
Siri has represented Uruguay at various youth levels. He was included in Uruguay's squad for the 2019 South American U-15 Championship. He was a part of the Uruguayan side that won the 2023 FIFA U-20 World Cup.

== Personal life ==
Siri is the younger brother of former Uruguay youth international Enzo Siri.

== Career statistics ==
As of match played 6 September 2026

Appearances and goals by club, season and competition
| Club | Season | League | | | National cup (Note: Includes Copa Uruguay, FA Cup) | | League cup | | Continental | | Other | | Total | |
| Club | Season | Division | Apps | Goals | Apps | Goals | Apps | Goals | Apps | Goals | Apps | Goals | Apps | Goals |
|---|---|---|---|---|---|---|---|---|---|---|---|---|---|---|
| Danubio | 2020 | Liga AUF Uruguaya | 10 | 4 | — | | — | | — | | — | | 10 | 4 |
| Danubio | 2021 | USD | 10 | 0 | — | | — | | — | | — | | 10 | 0 |
| Danubio | Total | | 20 | 4 | 0 | 0 | 0 | 0 | 0 | 0 | 0 | 0 | 20 | 4 |
| Montevideo City Torque | 2021 | Liga AUF Uruguaya | 5 | 0 | — | | — | | — | | — | | 5 | 0 |
| Montevideo City Torque | 2022 | Liga AUF Uruguaya | 9 | 0 | 0 | 0 | — | | 2 (Note: Appearances in Copa Libertadores) | 0 | — | | 11 | 0 |
| Montevideo City Torque | 2023 | Liga AUF Uruguaya | 29 | 10 | 1 | 0 | — | | — | | — | | 30 | 10 |
| Montevideo City Torque | 2024 | USD | 7 | 1 | 1 | 1 | — | | — | | 2 (Note: Appearances in promotion tiebreaker series) | 0 | 10 | 2 |
| Montevideo City Torque | 2025 | Liga AUF Uruguaya | 0 | 0 | 0 | 0 | — | | — | | — | | 0 | 0 |
| Montevideo City Torque | 2026 | Liga AUF Uruguaya | 0 | 0 | 0 | 0 | 0 | 0 | 0 | 0 | — | | 0 | 0 |
| Montevideo City Torque | Total | | 50 | 11 | 2 | 1 | 0 | 0 | 2 | 0 | 2 | 0 | 56 | 12 |
| Lommel (loan) | 2024–25 | Challenger Pro League | 10 | 2 | — | | — | | — | | — | | 10 | 2 |
| Salford City (loan) | 2025–26 | EFL League Two | 7 | 0 | 0 | 0 | 0 | 0 | — | | 3 (Note: Appearances in EFL Trophy) | 1 | 10 | 1 |
| Boston River | 2026 | Liga AUF Uruguaya | 6 | 1 | 0 | 0 | — | | — | | — | | 6 | 1 |
| Career total | | | 93 | 18 | 2 | 1 | 0 | 0 | 2 | 0 | 5 | 1 | 102 | 20 |

== Honours ==
Uruguay U20

- FIFA U-20 World Cup: 2023
- South American U-20 Championship runner-up: 2023
