= Josh Austerfield =

English footballer (born 2001)

Personal information
- Full name: Joshua James Austerfield
- Date of birth: 2 November 2001 (age 24)
- Place of birth: Morley, England
- Height: 5 ft 10 in (1.79 m)
- Position: Central midfielder

Team information
- Current team: Rotherham United

Youth career
- 2009–2019: Huddersfield Town

Senior career*
Years	Team	Apps	(Gls)
2020–2024	Huddersfield Town	1	(0)
2020	→ Brighouse Town (loan)	1	(0)
2020–2021	→ Hyde United (loan)	0	(0)
2022	→ Harrogate Town (loan)	11	(0)
2022–2023	→ Harrogate Town (loan)	17	(0)
2023	→ Morecambe (loan)	14	(0)
2024	→ Crewe Alexandra (loan)	9	(2)
2024–2026	Salford City	61	(2)
2026–	Rotherham United	0	(0)
- * Club domestic league appearances and goals as of 19:22, 13 March 2024 (UTC)

Joshua James Austerfield (born 2 November 2001) is an English professional footballer who plays as a central midfielder for EFL League Two club Rotherham United.

== Career ==
Born in Morley, Austerfield moved to Huddersfield Town at the age of eight from his local club in Drighlington. After progressing through the club's academy, he moved on loan to Brighouse Town in March 2020. He was sent off on his début, as a substitute in a defeat against Workington.

Austerfield made his senior debut for Huddersfield Town on 5 September 2020, when he played as a substitute in the club's EFL Cup defeat against Rochdale.

On 14 December 2020, Austerfield joined the Northern Premier League club Hyde United on a 28-day loan.

On 9 January 2021, Austerfield made his first professional start for Huddersfield, against Plymouth Argyle.

On 4 January 2022, he joined the EFL League Two side Harrogate Town on loan for the remainder of the 2021–22 season.

On 15 June 2022, Austerfield signed a new contract with Huddersfield, valid until summer 2026. He returned to Harrogate on loan for the 2022–23 season on 21 June 2022, alongside Huddersfield teammate Jaheim Headley. On 31 January 2023, Austerfield's loan at Harrogate was ended, so he could join EFL League One side Morecambe on loan for the rest of the 2022–23 season.

He made his league debut for Huddersfield on 26 August 2023 as a substitute in a 4–0 defeat to Norwich City.

On 18 January 2024, he joined League Two club Crewe Alexandra on loan for the remainder of the season, making his Crewe debut two days later as a 61st minute substitute for Chris Long in the side's 3–1 League Two win at Barrow on 20 January 2024. On his fourth appearance, he scored his first professional goal in Crewe's 3–1 win at Stockport County on 13 February 2024. Two games later, he scored again, in Crewe's 3–1 win at Notts County.

=== Salford City ===
On 17 August 2024, Austerfield signed for League Two club Salford City on a two-year deal.

=== Rotherham United ===
On 27 August 2026, Austerfield signed for Rotherham United for an undisclosed fee on a two-year deal, with an option to extend for an additional year.

== Career statistics ==
As of 28 August 2026

Appearances and goals by club, season and competition
Club	Season	League			FA Cup		EFL Cup		Other		Total	
Club	Season	Division	Apps	Goals	Apps	Goals	Apps	Goals	Apps	Goals	Apps	Goals
Huddersfield Town	2020–21	EFL Championship	0	0	1	0	1	0	—		2	0
Huddersfield Town	2023–24	EFL Championship	3	0	0	0	1	0	—		4	0
Huddersfield Town	Total		3	0	1	0	2	0	0	0	6	0
Harrogate Town (loan)	2021–22	League Two	11	0	—		—		—		11	0
Harrogate Town (loan)	2022–23	League One	17	0	2	0	1	0	3 (Note: Appearances in EFL Trophy)	0	23	0
Morecambe (loan)	2022–23	League Two	14	0	0	0	0	0	0	0	14	0
Crewe Alexandra (loan)	2023–24	League Two	9	2	0	0	0	0	0	0	9	2
Salford City	2024–25	League Two	21	0	2	0	0	0	2 (Note: Appearances in EFL Trophy)	0	25	0
Salford City	2025–26	League Two	41	2	4	0	1	0	4 (Note: Appearances in EFL Trophy)	1	50	3
Salford City	Total		61	2	6	0	1	0	6	0	75	3
Career total			116	4	9	0	4	0	9	1	138	5
