= Kallum Cesay =

Footballer (born 2002)

Personal information
- Full name: Kallum Xzeiba Tracey Cesay
- Date of birth: 4 September 2002 (age 24)
- Place of birth: Newham, England
- Height: 1.87 m (6 ft 2 in)
- Positions: Right-back; right wing-back; midfielder

Team information
- Current team: Salford City
- Number: 21

Youth career
- West Ham United
- –2023: Tottenham Hotspur

Senior career*
Years	Team	Apps	(Gls)
2024–2025	Wealdstone	46	(5)
2025–	Salford City	28	(4)

International career^{‡}
2022–	Sierra Leone	5	(2)
- * Club domestic league appearances and goals as of 2 May 2026 ‡ National team caps and goals as of 6 June 2026

Kallum Xzeiba Tracey Cesay (born 4 September 2002) is a professional footballer who plays for EFL League Two club Salford City. Born in England, he plays for the Sierra Leone national team. A versatile player, he can be deployed as a defensive midfielder, central midfielder, or anywhere on the right side.

== Club career ==
=== Early career ===
A youth team player at Tottenham Hotspur, Cesay signed his first professional contract on 29 July 2021. He was released by Tottenham in June 2023 at the end of the contract, without making a first-team appearance.

=== Wealdstone ===
After unsuccessful trials with Werder Bremen in September 2023 and with Huddersfield Town in October 2023, Cesay joined National League side Wealdstone in February 2024. He scored his first senior goal in club football in a 2-0 win over Rochdale in November 2024. Following a string of impressive performances, Cesay won Wealdstone's Player of The Month award for November. On 2 January 2025, Cesay signed a new contract with Wealdstone, running until the end of the 2025-2026 season.

=== Salford City ===
On 5 June 2025, Cesay joined League Two side Salford City on a two-year deal for an undisclosed fee.

== International career ==
In March 2022, Cesay received his first call-up to Sierra Leone national team for friendly matches against Togo, Liberia and Congo. He made his international debut on 29 March 2022 and scored a brace in his team's 2–1 win against Congo.

== Career statistics ==
=== Club ===
As of match played 31 January 2026

Appearances and goals by club, season and competition
Club	Season	League			FA Cup		EFL Cup		Continental		Other		Total	
Club	Season	Division	Apps	Goals	Apps	Goals	Apps	Goals	Apps	Goals	Apps	Goals	Apps	Goals
Tottenham Hotspur U21	2021–22	—			—		—		—		3 (Note: Appearance(s) in EFL Trophy)	0	3	0
Tottenham Hotspur U21	2022–23	—			—		—		—		2	0	2	0
Tottenham Hotspur U21	Total		—		—		—		—		5	0	5	0
Tottenham Hotspur	2021–22	Premier League	0	0	0	0	0	0	0	0	—		0	0
Wealdstone	2023–24	National League	9	0	—		—		—		—		9	0
Wealdstone	2024–25	National League	37	6	2	0	—		—		1 (Note: Appearance(s) in FA Trophy)	1	40	7
Wealdstone	Total		46	6	2	0	—		—		1	1	49	7
Salford City	2025–26	League Two	27	4	2	0	1	0	—		3	1	33	5
Career total			73	10	2	0	1	0	0	0	8	2	84	12

=== International ===
As of match played 6 June 2026

Appearances and goals by national team and year
National team	Year	Apps	Goals
Sierra Leone	2022	4	2
Sierra Leone	2026	1	0
Total		5	2

Scores and results list Sierra Leone's goal tally first, score column indicates score after each Cesay goal.

List of international goals scored by Kallum Cesay
No.	Date	Venue	Opponent	Score	Result	Competition	Ref.
1	29 March 2022	Mardan Sports Complex, Aksu, Turkey	Congo	1–0	2–1	Friendly	
2	29 March 2022	Mardan Sports Complex, Aksu, Turkey	Congo	2–0	2–1	Friendly	
