= Luke Garbutt =

English footballer

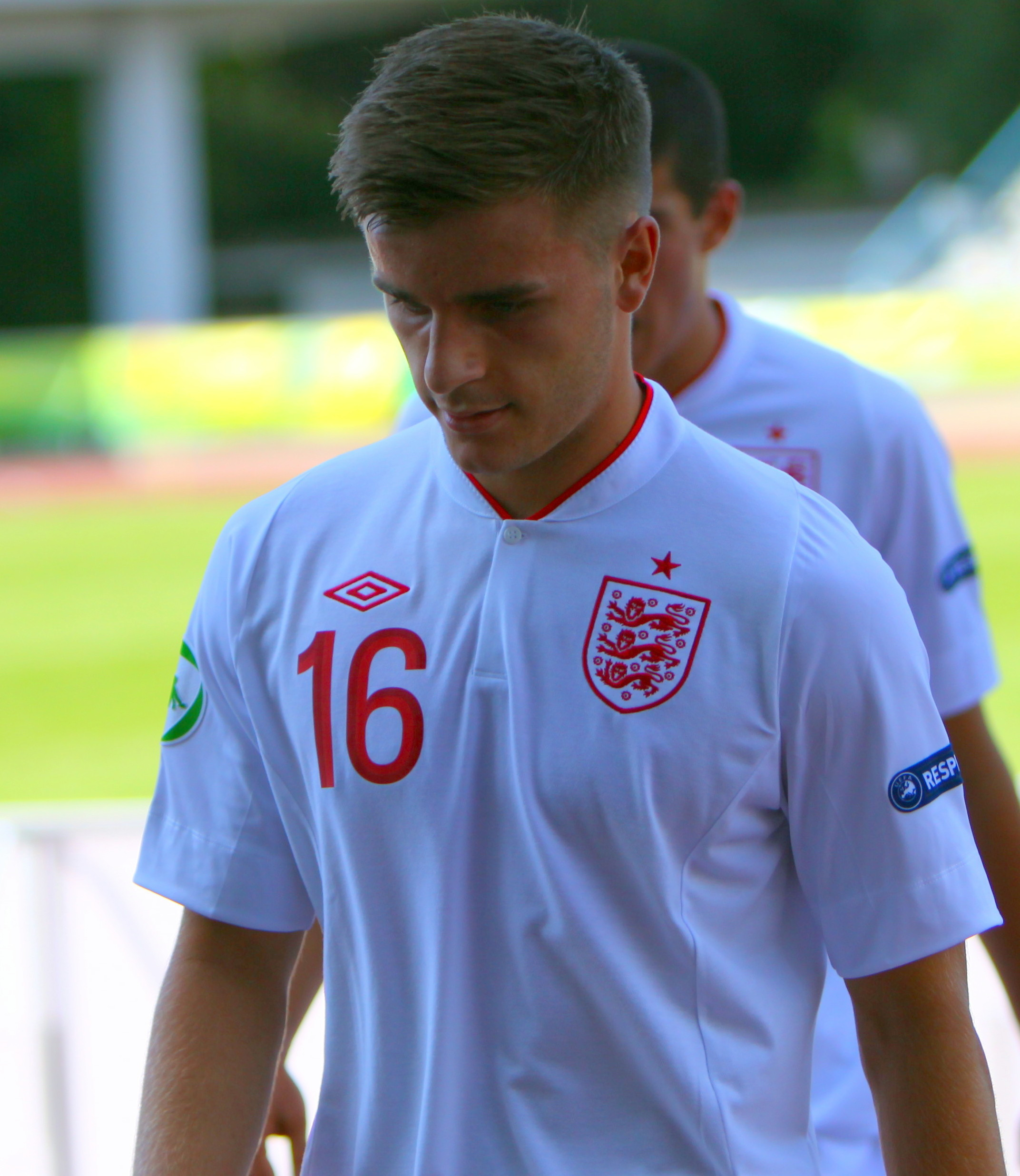
- Garbutt playing for England U19s in 2012

Personal information
- Full name: Luke Samuel Garbutt
- Date of birth: 21 May 1993 (age 33)
- Place of birth: Harrogate, England
- Height: 1.79 m (5 ft 10 1/2 in)
- Positions: Left back; winger

Team information
- Current team: Salford City
- Number: 29

Youth career
- 2001–2009: Leeds United
- 2009–2011: Everton

Senior career*
Years	Team	Apps	(Gls)
2011–2020	Everton	5	(0)
2011–2012	→ Cheltenham Town (loan)	34	(2)
2013–2014	→ Colchester United (loan)	19	(2)
2015–2016	→ Fulham (loan)	25	(1)
2016–2017	→ Wigan Athletic (loan)	8	(0)
2018–2019	→ Oxford United (loan)	25	(4)
2019–2020	→ Ipswich Town (loan)	28	(5)
2020–2023	Blackpool	56	(4)
2023–	Salford City	99	(8)

International career^{‡}
2008	England U16	5	(0)
2008–2010	England U17	24	(3)
2010	England U18	1	(0)
2011–2012	England U19	7	(0)
2013–2014	England U20	5	(0)
2014–2015	England U21	11	(0)
Medal record
Men's football
Representing England
UEFA European Under-17 Championship
Winner	2010 Liechtenstein
- * Club domestic league appearances and goals as of 23:41, 20 January 2026 (UTC) ‡ National team caps and goals as of 13:00, 24 June 2015 (UTC)

Luke Samuel Garbutt (born 21 May 1993) is an English professional footballer who plays as a defender for EFL League Two club Salford City. Usually a left back, he is also capable of playing as a winger. He has previously played for Everton, Cheltenham Town, Colchester United, Fulham, Wigan Athletic, Oxford United, Ipswich Town and Blackpool.

== Club career ==
=== Everton ===
Born in Harrogate, North Yorkshire, Garbutt attended Harrogate Grammar School where he played in the Year 7 School Football team that reached the Harrogate and District Cup Final in 2005. His impressive performances for his junior club team, Pannal Ash Juniors, saw him signed by Leeds United where he began his professional career. Shortly after leaving school, he was signed from their academy by Everton in 2009, for an initial fee of £600,000 which was set by a tribunal as the two clubs could not agree a fee. He was loaned to Cheltenham Town during the 2011–12 season.

In the 2012–13 season Garbutt made his Everton debut, coming on at half-time during a 5–0 League Cup second-round win over Leyton Orient on 29 August 2012.

Ahead of the 2013–14 season, Garbutt signed a new two-year contract with Everton, and during the season went to Colchester United on loan.

Garbutt made his Premier League debut as a late substitute at Southampton in April 2014 and built on that with his first appearance for England's Under-21s in a 3–1 European Championship qualifying win over Wales the following month.

==== Cheltenham Town (loan) ====
In September 2011 he joined Cheltenham Town on an initial one-month loan deal. He made his professional debut as Cheltenham beat Wycombe Wanderers 3–1 on 4 October 2011 in the Football League Trophy. His FA Cup debut was memorable as Cheltenham were drawn away to Premier League team Tottenham Hotspur; the game ended 3–0 to Tottenham. He continued to extend his loan spell and on 31 January 2012 scored his first goal, a free kick in a 3–1 win away at Macclesfield, sending Cheltenham to the top of the league in the process. He scored again in the following game, netting the opening goal against Crawley Town from outside the area. On 13 February he extended his loan spell by a further five weeks.

==== Colchester United (loan) ====
On 13 September 2013, Garbutt joined League One side Colchester United on an initial 28-day loan. He made his debut the following day, in a 2–2 draw against Bradford City at Valley Parade. On 28 January 2014, Everton recalled Garbutt from his loan spell following the lengthy injury to Bryan Oviedo.

==== Return to Everton ====
After making his first start for the club at the beginning of the 2014–15 season in a League Cup defeat to Swansea City in September, Garbutt started the final two UEFA Europa League group stage games, helping Everton finish top of the group with a clean sheet in a 2–0 win away to Wolfsburg. Garbutt was part of the starting 11 in both legs of the Europa League round of 16 tie against Swiss side BSC Young Boys in February, Everton progressing 7–2 on aggregate. This was the beginning of an extended run in the first team for Garbutt, starting in the following Premier League game against Arsenal, taking advantage of an injury to regular left-back Leighton Baines to maintain his place in the starting 11.

On 30 June 2015, Everton announced that Garbutt had signed a new five-year deal with the club.

==== Fulham (loan) ====
On 25 July 2015, Garbutt was loaned to Championship side Fulham for the 2015–16 season. He made his debut on 4 October 2015, in a 2–2 draw with Charlton Athletic at The Valley. He scored his first goal for Fulham in a 2–2 draw with Bolton Wanderers on 19 December 2015. He returned from his loan spell having made 26 appearances for the London club, scoring once.

==== Wigan Athletic (loan) ====
On 16 August 2016, Garbutt returned to the Championship, joining newly promoted Wigan Athletic on a four-and-a-half-month loan. He made his debut for the club on 20 August 2018, in a 4–3 defeat to Nottingham Forest. Garbutt made 8 appearances for Wigan during his loan spell with the club.

==== Oxford United (loan) ====
On 2 July 2018, Garbutt joined League One club Oxford United on a season-long loan. He scored his first goal for the club on 19 February 2019, in a 4–2 defeat to Accrington Stanley. He made 36 appearances in all competitions during his time at the Kassam Stadium, scoring 4 goals.

==== Ipswich Town (loan) and release ====
On 12 July 2019, he joined Ipswich Town on a season long loan deal. His scored his first goal for the club on his debut on 3 August 2019, netting the winning goal in a 1–0 away win against Burton Albion on the opening day of the 2019–20 season. He made 30 appearances during his loan spell at Ipswich, scoring 6 goals, including two long-range free-kicks against Tranmere Rovers and Lincoln City.

On 26 June 2020, it was announced that Garbutt would leave Everton at the end of the month upon the expiration of his contract, ending his 11-year association with the club. Upon his release after 11 years at the club, Everton manager Carlo Ancelotti was asked about Garbutt in a press conference, responding: "Who?"

=== Blackpool ===
On 22 September 2020, Garbutt joined Blackpool on a free transfer, signing a 12-month contract. He signed a two-year extension to his contract on 10 June 2021.

=== Salford City ===
In June 2023, Garbutt signed for Salford City after the expiration of his Blackpool contract.

== International career ==
Garbutt has represented England at under-16, under-17, under-18, under-19, under-20 and under-21 levels.

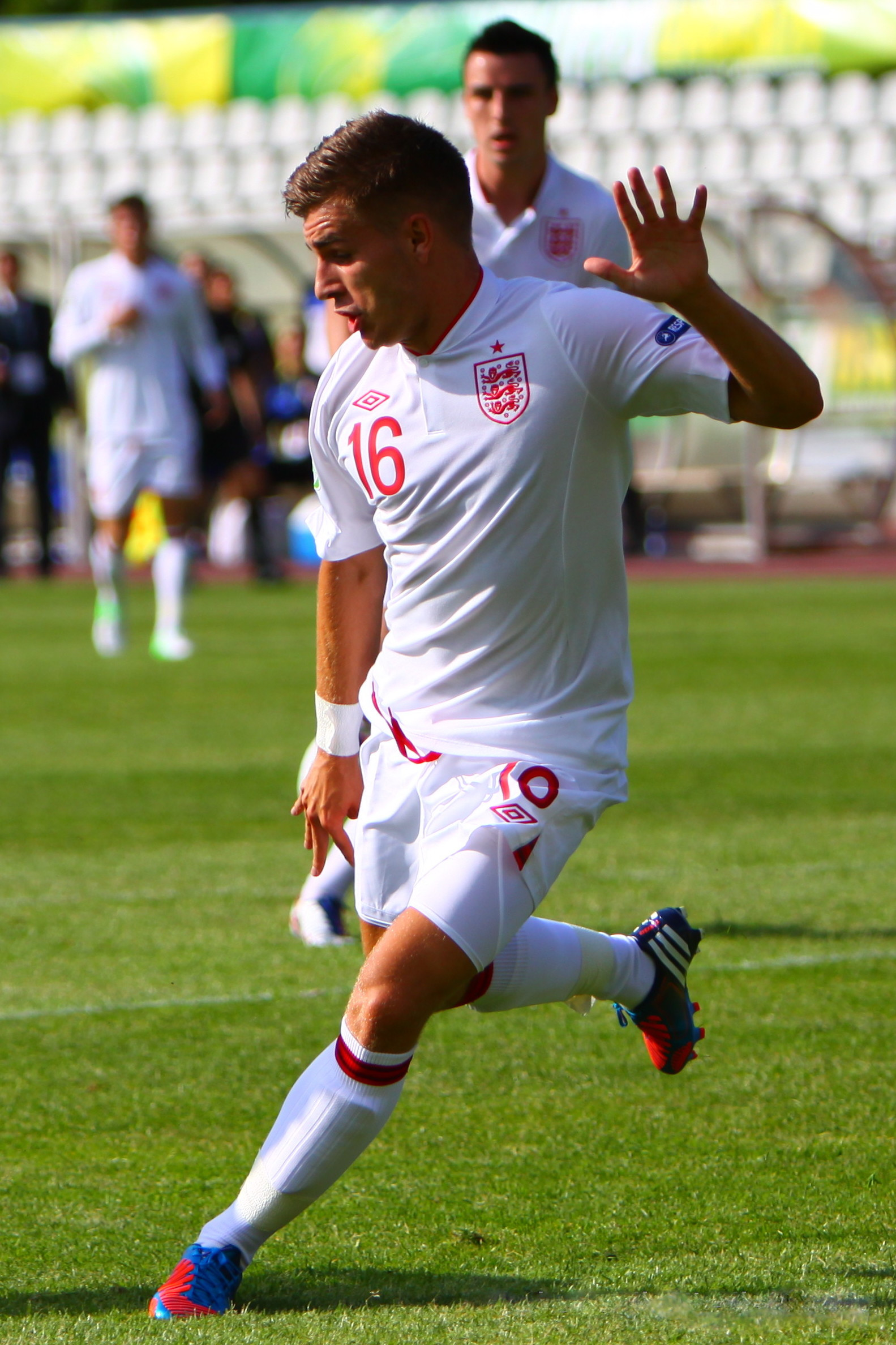
Garbutt playing for England U19s in 2012

He made his England U-16 debut against Germany in March 2008 and made his final England U-16 appearance against Scotland in November 2008. Four months earlier, he had made his England U-17 debut against Finland.

He helped England win the 2010 UEFA European Under-17 Football Championship and played in the final where England beat Spain 2–1. His performances earned him a place in the Team of the Tournament.

On 17 May 2013, he was named in manager Peter Taylor's provisional squad for the 2013 FIFA U-20 World Cup. Initially he did not make the final 21-man squad, but after Leeds United defender Sam Byram pulled out through injury he was named as his replacement. He made his debut on 16 June, in a 3–0 win in a warm-up game against Uruguay.

On 11 August, he was called up to the England under-21 squad to replace Southampton left-back Luke Shaw, for the friendly match against Scotland. Garbutt was an unused substitute as England won the game 6–0.

== Career statistics ==
As of match played 20 January 2026

Appearances and goals by club, season and competition
Club	Season	League			FA Cup		League Cup		Europe		Other		Total	
Club	Season	Division	Apps	Goals	Apps	Goals	Apps	Goals	Apps	Goals	Apps	Goals	Apps	Goals
Everton	2011–12	Premier League	0	0	0	0	0	0	—		—		0	0
Everton	2012–13	Premier League	0	0	0	0	1	0	—		—		1	0
Everton	2013–14	Premier League	1	0	0	0	0	0	—		—		1	0
Everton	2014–15	Premier League	4	0	0	0	1	0	5 (Note: Appearances in UEFA Europa League)	0	—		10	0
Everton	2015–16	Premier League	0	0	0	0	0	0	—		—		0	0
Everton	2016–17	Premier League	0	0	0	0	0	0	—		—		0	0
Everton	2017–18	Premier League	0	0	0	0	0	0	0	0	—		0	0
Everton	2018–19	Premier League	0	0	0	0	0	0	—		—		0	0
Everton	2019–20	Premier League	0	0	0	0	0	0	—		—		0	0
Everton	Total		5	0	0	0	2	0	5	0	0	0	12	0
Cheltenham Town (loan)	2011–12	League Two	34	2	1	0	0	0	—		2 (Note: One appearance in Football League Trophy, one appearance in League Two play-offs)	0	37	2
Colchester United (loan)	2013–14	League One	19	2	1	1	0	0	—		0	0	20	3
Fulham (loan)	2015–16	Championship	25	1	1	0	0	0	—		—		26	1
Wigan Athletic (loan)	2016–17	Championship	8	0	0	0	0	0	—		—		8	0
Everton U23	2017–18	—			—		—		—		3 (Note: Appearances in EFL Trophy)	0	3	0
Oxford United (loan)	2018–19	League One	25	4	3	0	3	0	—		5	0	36	4
Ipswich Town (loan)	2019–20	League One	28	5	2	1	0	0	—		0	0	30	6
Total			139	14	8	2	3	0	0	0	10	0	160	16
Blackpool	2020–21	League One	31	4	2	0	0	0	—		5 (Note: Two appearances in EFL Trophy, three appearances in EFL League One play-offs)	0	38	4
Blackpool	2021–22	Championship	17	0	1	0	1	0	—		—		19	0
Blackpool	2022–23	Championship	8	0	0	0	0	0	—		—		8	0
Blackpool	Total		56	4	3	0	1	0	0	0	5	0	65	4
Salford City	2023–24	League Two	33	2	2	0	2	0	—		1	0	38	2
Salford City	2024–25	League Two	41	3	3	0	1	0	—		1	0	46	3
Salford City	2025–26	League Two	25	3	3	1	1	0	—		3	0	32	4
Salford City	Total		99	8	8	1	4	0	—		5	0	116	9
Career total			299	26	19	3	10	0	5	0	20	0	353	29

== Honours ==
Blackpool

- EFL League One play-offs: 2021

England U17

- UEFA European Under-17 Championship: 2010

Individual

- UEFA European Under-17 Championship Team of the Tournament: 2010
