= 2018–19 Essex Senior Football League =

The 2018–19 season was the 48th in the history of Essex Senior Football League, a football competition in England.

The provisional club allocations for steps 5 and 6 were announced by the FA on 25 May 2018. The constitution was ratified by the league at its AGM.

The league featured 16 clubs which competed in the division last season, along with four new clubs.

- Clubs transferred from the Spartan South Midlands League:
  - Hoddesdon Town
  - St Margaretsbury
- Clubs transferred from the Eastern Counties League:
  - Saffron Walden Town
  - Stanway Rovers

Also, Wadham Lodge changed name to Leyton Athletic, while Waltham Forest changed name to Walthamstow.

Hullbridge Sports were champions, winning their first Essex Senior League title and were promoted to the Isthmian League.

== League table ==
Essex Senior Football League
- Season: 2018–19
- Champions: Hullbridge Sports
- Promoted: Hullbridge Sports
- Relegated: Barkingside; Leyton Athletic
- Matches: 380
- Goals: 1,303 (3.43 per match)
- Top goalscorer: Dwade James (35 goals)
- Biggest home win: Safford Walden Town 7–0 Leyton Athletic (26 January 2019); Takeley 8–1 Barkingside (6 April 2019)
- Biggest away win: St Margaretsbury 0–10 Redbridge (27 April 2019)
- Highest scoring: St Margaretsbury 0–10 Redbridge (27 April 2019)

Pos	Team	Pld	W	D	L	GF	GA	GD	Pts	Promotion or relegation
1	Hullbridge Sports	38	27	6	5	79	33	+46	87	Promoted to the Isthmian League
2	Stansted	38	26	4	8	87	39	+48	82	
3	Walthamstow	38	24	8	6	85	38	+47	80	
4	Saffron Walden Town	38	23	7	8	106	53	+53	76	
5	Takeley	38	23	4	11	76	45	+31	73	
6	Woodford Town 2017	38	19	7	12	88	54	+34	64	
7	St Margaretsbury	38	16	6	16	63	82	−19	54	
8	Sporting Bengal United	38	15	8	15	79	76	+3	53	
9	Hoddesdon Town	38	13	13	12	55	45	+10	52	
10	Ilford	38	14	7	17	59	65	−6	49	
11	Clapton	38	14	7	17	64	73	−9	49	
12	Redbridge	38	13	8	17	71	78	−7	47	
13	West Essex	38	13	8	17	61	69	−8	47	
14	Enfield 1893	38	12	10	16	56	79	−23	46	
15	Stanway Rovers	38	12	6	20	53	80	−27	42	Transferred to the Eastern Counties League
16	Tower Hamlets	38	11	7	20	51	64	−13	40	
17	Southend Manor	38	11	6	21	49	66	−17	39	
18	Sawbridgeworth Town	38	10	8	20	46	83	−37	38	
19	Barkingside	38	6	7	25	39	92	−53	25	Relegated to the Eastern Counties League
20	Leyton Athletic	38	4	11	23	36	89	−53	23	Relegated to the Eastern Counties League

Source: FA Full-Time
Rules for classification: 1) Points; 2) Goal difference; 3) Number of goals scored; 4) Number of matches won; 5) Head-to-head results
