= Kyrell Malcolm =

English footballer (born 2007)

Personal information
- Full name: Kyrell Lee Eliza Shay Malcolm
- Date of birth: 12 June 2007 (age 19)
- Place of birth: Manchester, England
- Position: Forward

Team information
- Current team: AFC Fylde (on loan from Salford City)

Youth career
- Salford City

Senior career*
Years	Team	Apps	(Gls)
2023–	Salford City	9	(0)
2026–	→ AFC Fylde (loan)	0	(0)
- * Club domestic league appearances and goals as of 16:08, 14 October 2026 (UTC)

Kyrell Lee Eliza Shay Malcolm (born 12 June 2007) is an English professional footballer who plays as a forward for AFC Fylde, on loan from EFL League Two club Salford City.

== Career ==
Malcolm made his debut for Salford City on 10 October 2023, in a 3–1 defeat to Stockport County in an EFL Trophy match at Moor Lane. He made his League Two debut on 27 February 2024, in a 1–1 home draw with Colchester United. Aged 16 years and 260 days, he was the youngest player to represent Salford in a league fixture, and was praised by manager Karl Robinson.

On 13 October 2026, Malcolm joined National League club AFC Fylde on a three-month loan deal.

== Career statistics ==
As of match played 6 October 2026

Appearances and goals by club, season and competition
Club	Season	League			FA Cup		EFL Cup		Other		Total	
Club	Season	Division	Apps	Goals	Apps	Goals	Apps	Goals	Apps	Goals	Apps	Goals
Salford City	2023–24	League Two	2	0	0	0	0	0	1 (Note: Appearance(s) in EFL Trophy)	0	3	0
Salford City	2024–25	League Two	2	0	1	0	1	0	2	0	6	0
Salford City	2025–26	League Two	3	0	0	0	1	0	2	0	6	0
Salford City	2026–27	League Two	2	0	0	0	1	1	2	0	5	1
Career total			9	0	1	0	3	1	7	0	20	1
