= Mackenzie Chapman =

English footballer (born 2002)

Personal information
- Full name: Mackenzie Jon Chapman
- Date of birth: 13 September 2002 (age 24)
- Place of birth: Bury, England
- Position: Goalkeeper

Team information
- Current team: Bolton Wanderers (academy goalkeeper coach)

Youth career
- 2010–2013: Accrington Stanley
- 2013–201?: Burnley
- 201?–201?: Manchester United
- 2018–2020: Oldham Athletic

Senior career*
Years	Team	Apps	(Gls)
2020–2021	Oldham Athletic	1	(0)
2021–2022	Oxford United	0	(0)
2021	→ Banbury United (loan)	0	(0)
2021	→ St Ives Town (loan)	2	(0)
2022–2023	Bolton Wanderers	0	(0)
2023–2025	Blackpool	0	(0)
2025–2026	Salford City	0	(0)
2025	→ St Albans City (loan)	2	(0)
2026	→ Hyde United (loan)	3	(0)
2026	→ Peterborough Sports (loan)	2	(0)
- * Club domestic league appearances and goals as of 10:42, 21 June 2026 (UTC)

Mackenzie Jon Chapman (born 13 September 2002) is an English former professional footballer who is the academy goalkeeper coach at EFL Championship side Bolton Wanderers.

== Career ==
=== Early career ===
Chapman was with Accrington Stanley from under-8 to under-11 level, before joining the Academy at Burnley. He switched to the Academy at Manchester United for the first year of his scholarship, and later joined EFL League Two club Oldham Athletic. He made his debut in the English Football League on 10 October 2020, coming on as a half-time substitute for Ian Lawlor in a 3–2 defeat to Morecambe at Boundary Park. On 27 August 2021, Chapman signed with Oxford United. On 26 October 2021, he joined Southern League Premier Division Central Banbury United on a one-month loan. He was recalled from his loan spell to provide cover at Oxford, though was allowed to leave again on loan once Simon Eastwood and Jack Stevens returned to training, with Kie Plumley also available. He returned to the Southern League Premier Division Central on loan with St Ives Town on 5 December. He made his debut for St Ives against Banbury. Chapman was signed to the B team of Bolton Wanderers on 12 October 2022, on a contract to run until the end of the 2022–23 season. He competed with Luke Hutchinson and Ellis Litherland for a first-team place. He was released upon the expiry of his contract.

=== Blackpool ===
On 18 July 2023, Chapman signed a one-year contract with EFL League One club Blackpool, with an option for a further 12 months, following a successful trial. He was signed to compete with Richard O'Donnell for a first-team place.

=== Salford City ===
On 1 October 2025, he joined EFL League Two Salford City on a one-year contract. Then on 11 November 2025, Chapman joined Isthmian League Premier Division club St Albans City on a one-month loan.

== Coaching career ==
On 4 August 2026, it was confirmed that Chapman had returned to Bolton as goalkeeper coach for the club's academy.

== Career statistics ==
As of 1 July 2023

Appearances and goals by club, season and competition
Club	Season	League			FA Cup		EFL Cup		Other		Total	
Club	Season	Division	Apps	Goals	Apps	Goals	Apps	Goals	Apps	Goals	Apps	Goals
Oldham Athletic	2020–21	EFL League Two	1	0	0	0	0	0	0	0	1	0
Banbury United (loan)	2021–22	Southern League; Premier Division Central	0	0	0	0	0	0	2 (Note: 1 appearance in the Southern League Cup and 1 appearance in the FA Trophy)	0	2	0
St Ives Town (loan)	2021–22	Southern League; Premier Division Central	2	0	0	0	0	0	0	0	2	0
Blackpool	2023–24	EFL League One	0	0	0	0	0	0	0	0	0	0
Career total			3	0	0	0	0	0	2	0	6	0
